= 1987 Rugby World Cup Pool 2 =

Pool 2 of the 1987 Rugby World Cup began on 24 May and was completed on 3 June. The pool was composed of Wales, Ireland, Canada and Tonga.

== Standings ==
Team	Pld	W	D	L	PF	PA	PD	T	Pts	Qualification
Wales	3	3	0	0	82	31	+51	13	6	Knockout stage
Ireland	3	2	0	1	84	41	+43	11	4	Knockout stage
Canada	3	1	0	2	65	90	−25	8	2	
Tonga	3	0	0	3	29	98	−69	3	0	

== Canada vs Tonga ==
24 May 1987

Canada	37–4	Tonga
Try: Palmer (2); Vaesen (2); Stuart; Frame; Penalty try Con: Wyatt (2); Gareth Rees; Pen: Rees	Report	Try: Valu

McLean Park, Napier
Attendance: 7,000
Referee: Clive Norling (Wales)

Canada	Tonga

FB	15	Mark Wyatt
RW	14	Pat Palmer
OC	13	Paul Vaesen
IC	12	Spence McTavish
LW	11	Tom Woods
FH	10	Gareth Rees
SH	9	Ian Stuart
N8	8	Glen Ennis
OF	7	Roy Radu
BF	6	Rob Frame
RL	5	Ron van den Brink
LL	4	Hans de Goede (c)
TP	3	Bill Handson
HK	2	Mark Cardinal
LP	1	Eddie Evans
Replacements:
FH	16	Ian Hyde-Lay
CE	17	Steve Gray
SH	18	Dave Tucker
FL	19	Bruce Breen
PR	20	Randy McKellar
HK	21	Karl Svoboda
Coach:
(Canada) Gary Johnston

FB	15	Tali Eteʻaki
RW	14	Soane Asi	(substituted off) 22'
OC	13	Samiu Mohi
IC	12	Talanoa Kitekeiʻaho
LW	11	Quddus Fielea
FH	10	Alamoni Liavaʻa
SH	9	Talai Fifita
N8	8	Kini Fotu
OF	7	Fakahau Valu (c)
BF	6	Taipaleti Tuʻuta
RL	5	Kasi Fine
LL	4	Polutele Tuʻihalamaka	(substituted off) 28'
TP	3	Hakatoa Tupou
HK	2	Amone Afu
LP	1	Soakai Motuʻapuaka
Replacements:
FB	16	Manu Vunipola
FH	17	Asa Amone
FH	18	Lemeki Vaipulu	(substituted in) 22'
PR	19	Viliami Lutua
PR	20	Takai Makisi
N8	21	Sione Tahaafe	(substituted in) 28'
Coach:
(Tonga) Prince Mailefihi

== Ireland vs Wales ==
25 May 1987

Ireland	6–13	Wales
Pen: Kiernan (2)	Report	Try: Ring; Pen: Thorburn; Drop: Davies (2)

Athletic Park, Wellington
Attendance: 15,000
Referee: Kerry Fitzgerald (Australia)

Ireland	Wales

FB	15	Hugo MacNeill
RW	14	Trevor Ringland
OC	13	Brendan Mullin
IC	12	Michael Kiernan
LW	11	Keith Crossan
FH	10	Paul Dean
SH	9	Michael Bradley
N8	8	Brian Spillane
OF	7	Derek McGrath
BF	6	Phillip Matthews	(substituted off) 35'
RL	5	Donal Lenihan (c)
LL	4	Willie Anderson
TP	3	Des Fitzgerald
HK	2	Terry Kingston
LP	1	Phillip Orr
Replacements:
PR	16	Job Langbroek
LK	17	Jim Glennon	(substituted in) 35'
SH	18	Tony Doyle
FH	21	Tony Ward
CE	20	David Irwin
Coach:
(Ireland) Syd Millar (Ireland) Jim Davidson

FB	15	Paul Thorburn
RW	14	Ieuan Evans
OC	13	John Devereux
IC	12	Mark Ring
LW	11	Adrian Hadley
FH	10	Jonathan Davies
SH	9	Robert Jones
N8	8	Paul Moriarty
OF	7	Richie Collins
BF	6	Gareth Roberts
RL	5	Richard Moriarty (c)
LL	4	Bob Norster
TP	3	Stuart Evans
HK	2	Kevin Phillips
LP	1	Jeff Whitefoot
Replacements:
WG	16	Glen Webbe
FH	17	Malcolm Dacey
SH	18	Ray Giles
PR	19	Anthony Buchanan
LK	20	Huw Richards
Coach:
(Wales) Tony Gray

== Tonga vs Wales ==
29 May 1987

Tonga	16–29	Wales
Try: Fielea; Fifita; Con: Liavaʻa; Pen: Liava'a; Amone	Report	Try: Webbe (3); Hadley; Con: Thorburn (2); Pen: Thorburn (2); Drop: Davies

Showgrounds Oval, Palmerston North
Attendance: 19,000
Referee: Dave Bishop (New Zealand)

Tonga	Wales

FB	15	Tali Eteʻaki
RW	14	Manu Vunipola
OC	13	Samiu Mohi
IC	12	Talanoa Kitekeiʻaho
LW	11	Quddus Fielea
FH	10	Asa Amone	(substituted off) 67'
SH	9	Talai Fifita
N8	8	Maliu Filise
OF	7	Fakahau Valu (c)
BF	6	Taipaleti Tuʻuta
RL	5	Kasi Fine
LL	4	Mofuike Tuʻungafasi
TP	3	Hakatoa Tupou	(substituted off) 44'
HK	2	Amone Afu
LP	1	Viliami Lutua
Replacements:
FB	16	Liueli Fusimalohi
CE	17	Alamoni Liavaʻa	(substituted in) 28'
FH	18	Lemeki Vaipulu
PR	19	Latu Vaʻeno	(substituted in) 67'
N8	20	Sione Tahaafe
PR	21	Takai Makisi
Coach:
(Tonga) Prince Mailefihi

FB	15	Paul Thorburn
RW	14	Glen Webbe
OC	13	Kevin Hopkins
IC	12	Mark Ring
LW	11	Adrian Hadley
FH	10	Malcolm Dacey	(substituted in) 58'
SH	9	Robert Jones
N8	8	Phil Davies
OF	7	Paul Moriarty
BF	6	Gareth Roberts
RL	5	Huw Richards
LL	4	Richard Moriarty (c)
TP	3	Stuart Evans	(substituted off) 75'
HK	2	Kevin Phillips
LP	1	Anthony Buchanan
Replacements:
WG	16	Ieuan Evans
FH	17	Jonathan Davies	(substituted in) 58'
SH	18	Ray Giles
HK	19	Alan Phillips
LK	20	Steve Blackmore	(substituted in) 75'
PR	21	Steve Sutton
Coach:
(Wales) Tony Gray

== Canada vs Ireland ==
30 May 1987

Canada	19–46	Ireland
Try: Cardinal; Pen: Rees (3); Wyatt; Drop: Rees	Report	Try: Crossan (2); Bradley; Spillane; Ringland; MacNeill; Con: Kiernan (5); Pen: Kiernan (2); Drop: Ward; Kiernan

Carisbrook, Dunedin
Attendance: 9,000
Referee: Fred Howard (England)

Canada	Ireland

FB	15	Mark Wyatt
RW	14	Pat Palmer
OC	13	John Lecky
IC	12	Spence McTavish
LW	11	Tom Woods
FH	10	Gareth Rees
SH	9	Ian Stuart
N8	8	Glen Ennis
OF	7	Roy Radu
BF	6	Rob Frame
RL	5	Hans de Goede (c)
LL	4	Ro Hindson
TP	3	Bill Handson
HK	2	Mark Cardinal
LP	1	Eddie Evans
Replacements:
PR	16	Randy McKellar
HK	17	Karl Svoboda
FL	18	Bruce Breen
SH	19	Dave Tucker
FH	20	Ian Hyde-Lay
CE	21	Steve Gray
Coach:
(Canada) Gary Johnston

FB	15	Hugo MacNeill
RW	14	Trevor Ringland
OC	13	Michael Kiernan
IC	12	Brendan Mullin
LW	11	Keith Crossan
FH	10	Tony Ward
SH	9	Michael Bradley
N8	8	Brian Spillane
OF	7	Paul Collins
BF	6	Derek McGrath
RL	5	Donal Lenihan (c)
LL	4	Willie Anderson
TP	3	Des Fitzgerald
HK	2	John MacDonald	(substituted off) 65'
LP	1	Phillip Orr
Replacements:
FB	16	Philip Rainey
HK	17	Terry Kingston	(substituted in) 65'
SH	18	Tony Doyle
FH	19	Paul Dean
CE	20	David Irwin
Coach:
(Ireland) Syd Millar (Ireland) Jim Davidson

== Canada vs Wales ==
3 June 1987

Canada	9–40	Wales
Pen: Rees (3)	Report	Try: Evans (4); Devereux; Bowen; Hadley; Phillips; Con: Thorburn (4)

Rugby Park, Invercargill
Attendance: 14,000
Referee: Dave Bishop (New Zealand)

Canada	Wales

FB	15	Mark Wyatt
RW	14	Pat Palmer
OC	13	Tom Woods
IC	12	John Lecky
LW	11	Steve Gray
FH	10	Gareth Rees
SH	9	Ian Stuart	(substituted off) 52'
N8	8	Glen Ennis
OF	7	Roy Radu
BF	6	Bruce Breen
RL	5	Hans de Goede (c)
LL	4	Ro Hindson
TP	3	Bill Handson
HK	2	Karl Svoboda
LP	1	Randy McKellar
Replacements:
FH	16	Ian Hyde-Lay
SH	17	Dave Tucker	(substituted in) 52'
FL	18	Roy Radu
PR	19	Eddie Evans
HK	20	Mark Cardinal
PR	21	Ross Breen
Coach:
(Canada) Gary Johnston

FB	15	Paul Thorburn
RW	14	Ieuan Evans
OC	13	John Devereux
IC	12	Bleddyn Bowen	(substituted off) 72'
LW	11	Adrian Hadley
FH	10	Jonathan Davies (c)
SH	9	Ray Giles
N8	8	Gareth Roberts
OF	7	Phil Davies
BF	6	Paul Moriarty	(substituted off) 77'
RL	5	Steve Sutton
LL	4	Bob Norster
TP	3	Steve Blackmore
HK	2	Alan Phillips
LP	1	Jeff Whitefoot
Replacements:
CE	16	Kevin Hopkins	(substituted in) 72'
CE	17	Mark Ring
SH	18	Robert Jones
PR	19	Anthony Buchanan
LK	20	Richard Moriarty	(substituted in) 77'
HK	21	Kevin Phillips
Coach:
(Wales) Tony Gray

== Ireland vs Tonga ==
3 June 1987

Ireland	32–9	Tonga
Try: Mullin (3); MacNeill (2); Con: Ward (3); Pen: Ward (2)	Report	Pen: Amone (3)

Ballymore, Brisbane
Attendance: 4,000
Referee: Guy Maurette (France)

Ireland	Tonga

FB	15	Hugo MacNeill
RW	14	Trevor Ringland
OC	13	Brendan Mullin
IC	12	David Irwin
LW	11	Keith Crossan
FH	10	Tony Ward
SH	9	Michael Bradley
N8	8	Derek McGrath
OF	7	Neil Francis
BF	6	Phillip Matthews
RL	5	Donal Lenihan (c)
LL	4	Willie Anderson
TP	3	J. J. McCoy
HK	2	Terry Kingston
LP	1	Job Langbroek
Replacements:
FB	16	Philip Rainey
CE	17	Michael Kiernan
SH	18	Tony Doyle
FL	19	Paul Collins
CE	20	Des Fitzgerald
HK	21	Steve Smith
Coach:
(Ireland) Syd Millar (Ireland) Jim Davidson

FB	15	Tali Eteʻaki
RW	14	Talanoa Kitekeiʻaho
OC	13	Alamoni Liavaʻa
IC	12	Samiu Mohi
LW	11	Quddus Fielea
FH	10	Asa Amone
SH	9	Talai Fifita
N8	8	Maliu Filise
OF	7	Fakahau Valu (c)
BF	6	Taipaleti Tuʻuta
RL	5	Kasi Fine
LL	4	Mofuike Tuʻungafasi
TP	3	Hakatoa Tupou
HK	2	Amone Afu
LP	1	Viliami Lutua
Replacements:
WG	16	Manu Vunipola
FH	17	Lemeki Vaipulu
FH	18	Taliaʻuli Liavaʻa
N8	19	Sione Tahaafe
PR	20	Takai Makisi
PR	21	Latu Vaʻeno
Coach:
(Tonga) Prince Mailefihi
