= 1987 Rugby World Cup knockout stage =

The knockout stage of the 1987 Rugby World Cup began on 6 June and was completed on 14 June.

== Quarter-finals ==
=== New Zealand vs Scotland ===
6 June 1987

New Zealand	30–3	Scotland
Try: Gallagher; Whetton; Con: Fox (2); Pen: Fox (6)	Report	Pen: Hastings

Lancaster Park, Christchurch
Attendance: 30,000
Referee: David Burnett (Ireland)

New Zealand	Scotland

FB	15	John Gallagher
RW	14	John Kirwan
OC	13	Joe Stanley
IC	12	Warwick Taylor	(substituted off) 20'
LW	11	Craig Green
FH	10	Grant Fox
SH	9	David Kirk (c)
N8	8	Buck Shelford
OF	7	Michael Jones
BF	6	Alan Whetton
RL	5	Gary Whetton
LL	4	Murray Pierce
TP	3	John Drake
HK	2	Sean Fitzpatrick
LP	1	Steve McDowall
Replacements:
CE	16	Bernie McCahill	(substituted on) 73'
FH	17	Frano Botica
SH	18	Bruce Deans
FL	19	Zinzan Brooke
PR	20	Richard Loe
HK	21	Andy Dalton
Coach:
(New Zealand) Brian Lochore

FB	15	Gavin Hastings
RW	14	Matt Duncan
OC	13	Alan Tait
IC	12	Keith Robertson
LW	11	Iwan Tukalo
FH	10	Douglas Wyllie
SH	9	Roy Laidlaw
N8	8	Iain Paxton
OF	7	Finlay Calder
BF	6	Derek Turnbull
RL	5	Alan Tomes
LL	4	Derek White
TP	3	Iain Milne
HK	2	Colin Deans (c)
LP	1	David Sole
Replacements:
HK	16	Gary Callander
PR	17	Alex Brewster
SH	18	Greig Oliver
LK	19	Jeremy Campbell-Lamerton
FL	20	Richard Cramb
FB	21	Peter Dods
Coach:
(Scotland) Derrick Grant

=== Fiji vs France ===
7 June 1987

Fiji	16–31	France
Try: Damu; Qoro; Con: Koroduadua; Pen: Koroduadua (2)	Report	Try: Lagisquet; Lorieux; Rodriguez (2); Pen: Laporte; Drop: Laporte

Eden Park, Auckland
Attendance: 17,000
Referee: Clive Norling (Wales)

Fiji	France

FB	15	Jone Kubu
RW	14	Jimi Damu
OC	13	Kaiava Salusalu
IC	12	Tomasi Cama
LW	11	Tom Mitchell
FH	10	Severo Koroduadua
SH	9	Paulo Nawalu
N8	8	Livai Kididromo
OF	7	Salacieli Naivilawasa
BF	6	Manasa Qoro	(substituted off) 25'
RL	5	Ilaitia Savai	(substituted off) 45'
LL	4	Koli Rakoroi (c)
TP	3	Peni Volavola
HK	2	Epeli Rakai
LP	1	Sairusi Naituku
Replacements:
FL	16	Samuela Vunivalu	(substituted on) 15'
LK	17	Aisake Nadolo	(substituted on) 45'
Coach:
(Fiji) Jo Sovau

FB	15	Serge Blanco	(substituted off) 79'
RW	14	Denis Charvet
OC	13	Eric Bonneval
IC	12	Franck Mesnel
LW	11	Patrice Lagisquet
FH	10	Guy Laporte
SH	9	Pierre Berbizier
N8	8	Laurent Rodriguez
OF	7	Dominique Erbani
BF	6	Eric Champ
RL	5	Alain Lorieux
LL	4	Francis Haget
TP	3	Jean-Pierre Garuet-Lempirou
HK	2	Daniel Dubroca (c)
LP	1	Pascal Ondarts
Replacements:
FB	16	Didier Camberabero	(substituted on) 79'
Coach:
(France) Jacques Fouroux

=== Australia vs Ireland ===
7 June 1987

Australia	33–15	Ireland
Try: Burke (2); McIntyre; Smith; Con: Lynagh (4); Pen: Lynagh (3)	Report	Try: Kiernan; MacNeill; Con: Kiernan (2); Pen: Kiernan

Concord Oval, Sydney
Attendance: 14,856
Referee: Brian Anderson (Scotland)

Australia	Ireland

FB	15	David Campese
RW	14	Peter Grigg
OC	13	Andrew Slack (c)
IC	12	Brett Papworth
LW	11	Matt Burke
FH	10	Michael Lynagh
SH	9	Nick Farr-Jones	(substituted off) 5'
N8	8	Jeff Miller
OF	7	Steve Tuynman
BF	6	Simon Poidevin
RL	5	William Campbell
LL	4	Steve Cutler
TP	3	Andy McIntyre
HK	2	Tom Lawton
LP	1	Cameron Lillicrap
Replacements:
FB	16	Andrew Leeds
FB	17	Anthony Herbert
SH	18	Brian Smith	(substituted on) 5'
FL	19	Troy Coker
PR	20	Enrique Rodriguez
HK	21	Mark McBain
Coach:
(Australia) Alan Jones

FB	15	Hugo MacNeill
RW	14	Trevor Ringland
OC	13	Michael Kiernan
IC	12	Brendan Mullin	(substituted off) 67'
LW	11	Keith Crossan
FH	10	Paul Dean
SH	9	Michael Bradley
N8	8	Neil Francis	(substituted off) 52'
OF	7	Derek McGrath
BF	6	Phillip Matthews
RL	5	Willie Anderson
LL	4	Donal Lenihan (c)
TP	3	Des Fitzgerald
HK	2	Terry Kingston
LP	1	Phillip Orr
Replacements:
FB	16	David Irwin	(substituted on) 67'
HK	17	Tony Ward
SH	18	Tony Doyle
FH	19	Brian Spillane	(substituted on) 52'
CE	20	Steve Smith
PR	21	Job Langbroek
Coach:
(Ireland) Syd Millar (Ireland) Jim Davidson

=== England vs Wales ===
8 June 1987

England	3–16	Wales
Pen: Webb	Report	Try: Devereux; Jones; Roberts; Con: Thorburn (2)

Ballymore Stadium, Brisbane
Attendance: 15,000
Referee: René Hourquet (France)

England	Wales

FB	15	Jonathan Webb
RW	14	Mike Harrison (c)
OC	13	Kevin Simms
IC	12	Jamie Salmon
LW	11	Rory Underwood
FH	10	Peter Williams
SH	9	Richard Harding
N8	8	Dean Richards
OF	7	Gary Rees
BF	6	Peter Winterbottom
RL	5	Nigel Redman
LL	4	Wade Dooley
TP	3	Gary Pearce
HK	2	Brian Moore
LP	1	Paul Rendall	(substituted off) 24'
Replacements:
SH	16	Richard Hill
FH	17	Rob Andrew
CE	18	Fran Clough
FL	19	Dave Egerton
HK	20	Graham Dawe
PR	21	Gareth Chilcott	(substituted on) 24'
Coach:
(England) Martin Green

FB	15	Paul Thorburn
RW	14	Ieuan Evans
OC	13	John Devereux
IC	12	Bleddyn Bowen
LW	11	Adrian Hadley
FH	10	Jonathan Davies
SH	9	Robert Jones
N8	8	Paul Moriarty
OF	7	Richie Collins
BF	6	Gareth Roberts
RL	5	Bob Norster	(substituted off) 73'
LL	4	Richard Moriarty (c)
TP	3	Dai Young
HK	2	Alan Phillips
LP	1	Anthony Buchanan
Replacements:
CE	16	Mark Ring
FH	17	Malcolm Dacey
SH	18	Ray Giles
LK	19	Huw Richards	(substituted on) 73'
PR	20	Steve Blackmore
HK	21	Kevin Phillips
Coach:
(Wales) Tony Gray

== Semi-finals ==
=== Australia vs France ===
13 June 1987

Australia	24–30	France
Try: Campese; Codey; Con: Lynagh (2); Pen: Lynagh (3); Drop: Lynagh	Report	Try: Blanco; Lagisquet; Lorieux; Sella; Con: Camberabero (4); Pen: Camberabero (2)

Concord Oval, Sydney
Attendance: 17,768
Referee: Brian Anderson (Scotland)

Australia	France

FB	15	David Campese
RW	14	Peter Grigg
OC	13	Andrew Slack (c)
IC	12	Brett Papworth	(substituted off) 8'
LW	11	Matt Burke
FH	10	Michael Lynagh
SH	9	Nick Farr-Jones
N8	8	Troy Coker
OF	7	Jeff Miller
BF	6	Simon Poidevin
RL	5	William Campbell	(substituted off) 20'
LL	4	Steve Cutler
TP	3	Andy McIntyre
HK	2	Tom Lawton
LP	1	Cameron Lillicrap
Replacements:
FB	16	Andrew Leeds
CE	17	Anthony Herbert	(substituted on) 5'
SH	18	Brian Smith
FL	19	David Codey	(substituted on) 20'
PR	20	Enrique Rodriguez
HK	21	Mark McBain
Coach:
(Australia) Alan Jones

FB	15	Serge Blanco	(substituted off) 79'
RW	14	Didier Camberabero
OC	13	Philippe Sella
IC	12	Denis Charvet
LW	11	Patrice Lagisquet
FH	10	Franck Mesnel
SH	9	Pierre Berbizier
N8	8	Laurent Rodriguez
OF	7	Dominique Erbani
BF	6	Eric Champ
RL	5	Alain Lorieux
LL	4	Francis Haget
TP	3	Jean-Pierre Garuet-Lempirou
HK	2	Daniel Dubroca (c)
LP	1	Pascal Ondarts
Replacements:
FB	16	Philippe Dintrans
PR	17	Louis Armary
FL	18	Jean-Luc Joinel
SH	19	Rodolphe Modin
WG	20	Marc Andrieu
WG	21	Jean-Baptiste Lafond
Coach:
(France) Jacques Fouroux

=== New Zealand vs Wales ===
14 June 1987

New Zealand	49–6	Wales
Try: Brooke-Cowden; Drake; Kirwan (2); Shelford (2); Joe Stanley; A. Whetton; Con: Fox (7); Pen: Fox	Report	Try: Devereux; Con: Thorburn

Ballymore Stadium, Brisbane
Attendance: 25,000
Referee: Kerry Fitzgerald (Australia)

New Zealand	Wales

FB	15	John Gallagher
RW	14	John Kirwan
OC	13	Joe Stanley	(substituted off) 73'
IC	12	Warwick Taylor
LW	11	Craig Green
FH	10	Grant Fox
SH	9	David Kirk (c)
N8	8	Buck Shelford
OF	7	Mark Brooke-Cowden
BF	6	Alan Whetton
RL	5	Gary Whetton
LL	4	Murray Pierce
TP	3	John Drake
HK	2	Sean Fitzpatrick
LP	1	Steve McDowall
Replacements:
CE	16	Bernie McCahill	(substituted on) 20'
FH	17	Frano Botica
SH	18	Bruce Deans
FL	19	Zinzan Brooke
PR	20	Richard Loe
HK	21	Andy Dalton
Coach:
(New Zealand) Brian Lochore

FB	15	Paul Thorburn
RW	14	Ieuan Evans
OC	13	John Devereux
IC	12	Bleddyn Bowen
LW	11	Adrian Hadley
FH	10	Jonathan Davies
SH	9	Robert Jones
N8	8	Phil Davies
OF	7	Richie Collins	(substituted off) 40'
BF	6	Paul Moriarty
RL	5	Huw Richards
LL	4	Richard Moriarty (c)
TP	3	Dai Young
HK	2	Kevin Phillips
LP	1	Anthony Buchanan
Replacements:
CE	16	Mark Ring
FH	17	Malcolm Dacey
SH	18	Ray Giles
LK	19	Steve Sutton	(substituted on) 40'
PR	20	Steve Blackmore
HK	21	Alan Phillips
Coach:
(Wales) Tony Gray

== Third place play-off ==
18 June 1987

Australia	21–22	Wales
Try: Burke; Grigg; Con: Lynagh (2); Pen: Lynagh (2); Drop: Lynagh	Report	Try: Roberts; Moriarty; Hadley; Con: Thorburn (2); Pen: Thorburn (2)

Rotorua International Stadium, Rotorua
Attendance: 29,000
Referee: Fred Howard (England)

Australia	Wales

FB	15	Andrew Leeds
RW	14	Peter Grigg	(substituted off) 46'
OC	13	Matt Burke
IC	12	Andrew Slack (c)
LW	11	David Campese
FH	10	Michael Lynagh
SH	9	Brian Smith
N8	8	Steve Tuynman
OF	7	David Codey
BF	6	Simon Poidevin
RL	5	Troy Coker
LL	4	Steve Cutler
TP	3	Andy McIntyre
HK	2	Tom Lawton
LP	1	Cameron Lillicrap	(substituted off) 76'
Replacements:
SH	16	Nick Farr-Jones	(substituted on) 46'
PR	17	Enrique Rodriguez	(substituted on) 76'
HK	18	Mark McBain
FB	19	Anthony Herbert
FH	20	Steve James
N8	21	Ross Reynolds
Coach:
(Australia) Alan Jones

FB	15	Paul Thorburn
RW	14	Ieuan Evans
OC	13	John Devereux
IC	12	Mark Ring
LW	11	Adrian Hadley
FH	10	Jonathan Davies
SH	9	Robert Jones
N8	8	Paul Moriarty
OF	7	Richard Webster
BF	6	Gareth Roberts
RL	5	Steve Sutton
LL	4	Richard Moriarty (c)
TP	3	Steve Blackmore
HK	2	Alan Phillips
LP	1	Anthony Buchanan
Replacements:
FH	16	Malcolm Dacey
CE	17	Ray Giles
CE	18	Kevin Hopkins
PR	19	Dai Young
HK	20	Kevin Phillips
N8	21	Phil Davies
Coach:
(Wales) Tony Gray

== Final ==
20 June 1987

New Zealand	29–9	France
Try: Jones; Kirk; Kirwan; Con: Fox; Pen: Fox (4); Drop: Fox	Report	Try: Berbizier; Con: Camberabero; Pen: Camberabero

Eden Park, Auckland
Attendance: 48,035
Referee: Kerry Fitzgerald (Australia)

New Zealand	France

FB	15	John Gallagher
RW	14	John Kirwan
OC	13	Joe Stanley
IC	12	Warwick Taylor
LW	11	Craig Green
FH	10	Grant Fox
SH	9	David Kirk (c)
N8	8	Buck Shelford
OF	7	Michael Jones
BF	6	Alan Whetton
RL	5	Gary Whetton
LL	4	Murray Pierce
TP	3	John Drake
HK	2	Sean Fitzpatrick
LP	1	Steve McDowall
Coach:
(New Zealand) Brian Lochore

FB	15	Serge Blanco
RW	14	Didier Camberabero
OC	13	Philippe Sella
IC	12	Denis Charvet
LW	11	Patrice Lagisquet
FH	10	Franck Mesnel
SH	9	Pierre Berbizier
N8	8	Laurent Rodriguez
OF	7	Dominique Erbani
BF	6	Éric Champ
RL	5	Jean Condom
LL	4	Alain Lorieux
TP	3	Jean-Pierre Garuet-Lempirou
HK	2	Daniel Dubroca (c)
LP	1	Pascal Ondarts
Coach:
(France) Jacques Fouroux
