= Wales at the Rugby World Cup =

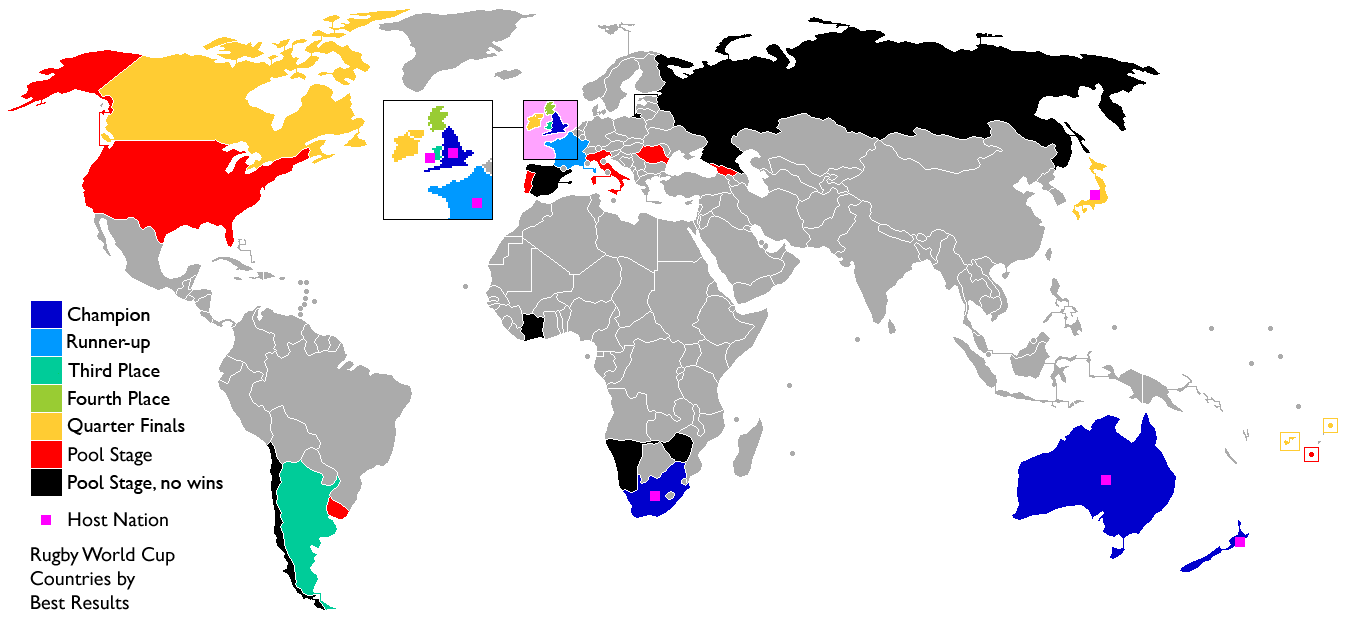
Map of nations best results, excluding nations which unsuccessfully participated in qualifying tournaments.

The Rugby World Cup is a rugby union tournament held every four years and contested by the men's national teams of the member unions of World Rugby. The Wales national rugby union team has participated in all ten Rugby World Cup tournaments. Up to and including 2015, hosting of the tournament alternated between traditional rugby heartlands in the southern hemisphere and those in Europe. Wales was the primary host in 1999, with Cardiff's Millennium Stadium built to coincide with the event, and the other three tournaments played in Europe have also used venues in Wales to some degree. Cardiff's Millennium Stadium and its predecessor, the Cardiff Arms Park, will have hosted a total 21 matches over a total of four World Cups. This is the largest number of World Cup games hosted by one venue.

The 1987 tournament was Wales' most successful; they won all three pool matches and their quarter-final, before losing to New Zealand in the semi-finals. They then faced Australia in the third place play-off match, which they won 22–21. In the next two tournaments in 1991 and 1995, Wales failed to progress beyond the pool stage, winning just one match in each tournament. Both the 1999 and 2003 tournaments were more successful, with Wales qualifying for the quarter-finals both times. Wales hosted the event in 1999 and topped their pool only to lose to eventual winners Australia in the quarter-finals. In 2003, they finished second in their pool to New Zealand and faced England in the quarter-finals, where they lost to the eventual champions, despite scoring more tries than their opponents. In the 2007 World Cup, Wales again failed to progress from the pool stage. After a loss to Australia, and two wins against Japan and Canada, they lost by four points to Fiji, despite scoring more tries than their opponents. At the 2011 World Cup, Wales reached the semi-finals for the first time since 1987. Playing the semi-finals against France, Wales lost 9–8, in a game overshadowed by the 18th-minute sending off of Wales' captain Sam Warburton for a dangerous tackle against Vincent Clerc. At the 2015 World Cup Wales were in the same pool as Australia, England, Fiji and Uruguay. They finished second in the pool behind Australia and ahead of hosts England. South Africa defeated Wales in the quarter-final. In the 2019 World Cup, Wales were in pool D with Australia, Fiji, Georgia and Uruguay. They won all their group matches to finish top of the pool. After defeating France in the quarter-final, they lost to the eventual tournament winners South Africa in the semi-final.

== Overall ==
Rugby World Cup record									Qualification						
Year	Round	Pld	W	D	L	PF	PA	Squad	Pos	Pld	W	D	L	PF	PA
(New Zealand) (Australia) 1987	Third place	6	5	0	1	126	104	Squad	Invited						
(England) (France) (Ireland) (Scotland) (Wales) 1991	Pool stage	3	1	0	2	32	61	Squad	Automatically qualified						
(South Africa) 1995	Pool stage	3	1	0	2	89	68	Squad	1st	4	4	0	0	156	11
(Wales) 1999	Quarter-finals	4	2	0	2	127	95	Squad	Automatically qualified						
(Australia) 2003	Quarter-finals	5	3	0	2	149	126	Squad	Automatically qualified						
(France) 2007	Pool stage	4	2	0	2	168	105	Squad	Automatically qualified						
(New Zealand) 2011	Fourth place	7	4	0	3	228	74	Squad	Automatically qualified						
(England) 2015	Quarter-finals	5	3	0	2	130	85	Squad	Automatically qualified						
(Japan) 2019	Fourth place	7	5	0	2	189	147	Squad	Automatically qualified						
(France) 2023	Quarter-finals	5	4	0	1	160	88	Squad	Automatically qualified						
(Australia) 2027	Qualified								Automatically qualified						
(United States) 2031	To be determined								To be determined						
Total	—	49	30	0	19	1398	953	—	—	4	4	0	0	156	11
Champions; Runners–up; Third place; Fourth place; Home venue

== 1987 New Zealand & Australia ==
=== Pool stage ===
Team	Pld	W	D	L	PF	PA	PD	T	Pts	Qualification
Wales	3	3	0	0	82	31	+51	13	6	Knockout stage
Ireland	3	2	0	1	84	41	+43	11	4	Knockout stage
Canada	3	1	0	2	65	90	−25	8	2	
Tonga	3	0	0	3	29	98	−69	3	0	

25 May 1987

Ireland	6–13	Wales
Pen: Kiernan (2)	Report	Try: Ring; Pen: Thorburn; Drop: Davies (2)

Athletic Park, Wellington
Attendance: 15,000
Referee: Kerry Fitzgerald (Australia)

29 May 1987

Tonga	16–29	Wales
Try: Fielea; Fifita; Con: Liavaʻa; Pen: Liava'a; Amone	Report	Try: Webbe (3); Hadley; Con: Thorburn (2); Pen: Thorburn (2); Drop: Davies

Showgrounds Oval, Palmerston North
Attendance: 19,000
Referee: Dave Bishop (New Zealand)

3 June 1987

Canada	9–40	Wales
Pen: Rees (3)	Report	Try: Evans (4); Devereux; Bowen; Hadley; Phillips; Con: Thorburn (4)

Rugby Park, Invercargill
Attendance: 14,000
Referee: Dave Bishop (New Zealand)

=== Knockout stage ===
==== Quarter-final ====
8 June 1987

England	3–16	Wales
Pen: Webb		Try: Roberts; Jones; Devereux; Con: Thorburn (2)

Ballymore, Brisbane
Referee: Rene Hourquet (France)

==== Semi-final ====
14 June 1987

New Zealand	49–6	Wales
Try: Kirwan (2); Shelford (2); Drake; Whetton; Stanley; Brooke-Cowden; Con: Fox (7); Pen: Fox		Try: Devereux; Con: Thorburn

Ballymore, Brisbane
Attendance: 22,576
Referee: Kerry Fitzgerald (Australia)

==== Third place play-off ====
18 June 1987

Australia	21–22	Wales
Try: Burke; Grigg; Con: Lynagh (2); Pen: Lynagh (2); Drop: Lynagh		Try: Roberts; Moriarty; Hadley; Con: Thorburn (2); Pen: Thorburn (2)

Rotorua International Stadium, Rotorua
Referee: Fred Howard (England)

== 1991 UK, Ireland & France ==
=== Hosting ===
England was billed as the main host of the second tournament in 1991, hosting the opening ceremony, and final, though the hosting duties were shared between all countries which competed in the Five Nations Championship. France hosted eight games, England and Wales each hosted seven, and Scotland and Ireland five. The National Stadium in Cardiff hosted the third place playoff, whilst all of Pool C's matches were played in Wales. Wales were scheduled to feature in this pool, and all three of their pool matches were hosted in the National Stadium. One game each was played at the club grounds of Pontypridd, Pontypool and Llanelli.

The following Welsh stadiums were used:

City	Stadium	Capacity
Cardiff	National Stadium, Cardiff Arms Park	53,000
Llanelli	Stradey Park	10,800
Pontypool	Pontypool Park	8,800
Pontypridd	Sardis Road	7,200

=== Pool stage ===
6 October 1991

Wales	13–16	Western Samoa
Try: Emyr; Evans; Con: Ring; Pen: Ring		Try: Vaega; Vaifale; Con: Vaea; Pen: Vaea (2)

Cardiff Arms Park, Cardiff
Referee: Patrick Robin (France)

9 October 1991

Wales	16–7	Argentina
Try: Arnold; Pen: Ring (3); Rayer		Try: García Simón; Pen: Del Castillo

Cardiff Arms Park, Cardiff
Referee: Rene Hourquet (France)

12 October 1991

Wales	3–38	Australia
Pen: Ring		Try: Roebuck (2); Slattery; Campese; Horan; Lynagh; Con: Lynagh (4); Pen: Lynagh (2)

Cardiff Arms Park, Cardiff
Referee: Keith Lawrence (New Zealand)

Team	Pld	W	D	L	PF	PA	PD	Pts
Australia	3	3	0	0	79	25	+54	6
Western Samoa	3	2	0	1	54	34	+20	4
Wales	3	1	0	2	32	61	−29	2
Argentina	3	0	0	3	38	83	−45	0

== 1995 South Africa ==
=== Pool stage ===
27 May 1995

Japan	10–57	Wales
Try: Ota (2)		Try: G. Thomas (3); I. Evans (2); Moore; Taylor; Con: N. Jenkins (5); Pen: N. Jenkins (4)

Free State Stadium, Bloemfontein
Attendance: 12,000
Referee: Efrahim Sklar (Argentina)

31 May 1995

New Zealand	34–9	Wales
Try: Marc Ellis; Walter Little; Josh Kronfeld; Con: Andrew Mehrtens (2); Pen: Andrew Mehrtens (4); Drop: Andrew Mehrtens		Pen: Neil Jenkins (2); Drop: Neil Jenkins

Ellis Park, Johannesburg
Attendance: 38,000
Referee: Ed Morrison (England)

4 June 1995

Ireland	24–23	Wales
Try: Eddie Halvey; Nick Popplewell; Denis McBride; Con: Eric Elwood (3); Pen: Eric Elwood		Try: Jonathan Humphreys; Hemi Taylor; Con: Neil Jenkins (2); Pen: Neil Jenkins (2); Drop: Adrian Davies

Ellis Park, Johannesburg
Attendance: 35,000
Referee: Ian Rogers (South Africa)

Team	Pld	W	D	L	PF	PA	PD	Pts
New Zealand	3	3	0	0	222	45	+177	9
Ireland	3	2	0	1	93	94	−1	7
Wales	3	1	0	2	89	68	+21	5
Japan	3	0	0	3	55	252	−197	3

== 1999 Wales ==
=== Hosting ===
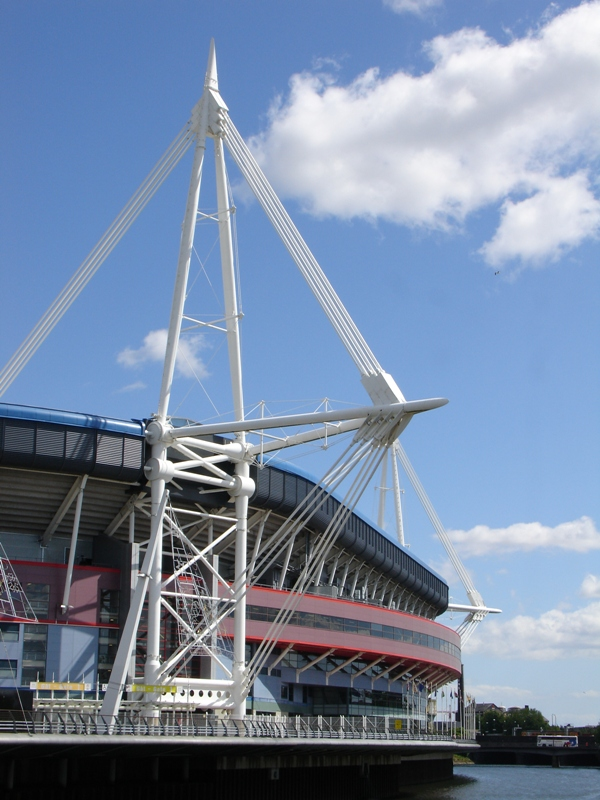
Millennium Stadium, Cardiff, where Wales play their home games

Wales was chosen by the International Rugby Board as the principal host for the 1999 event. The centrepiece venue of the tournament, hosting the opening ceremony and final was the Millennium Stadium, a new structure built on the site of the old National Stadium at Cardiff Arms Park at a cost of £126 million from private investment. An agreement was reached with the unions of all four rivals in the Five Nations Championship (England, France, Ireland and Scotland), so that, like 1991, the majority of the matches would take place outside the official host nation. In a unique tournament format there were five pools in the opening round. Each of the five unions competed in a separate pool, and acted as host for all of the matches within that pool. All Pool A games were held in Scotland, Pool B games in England, Pool C games in France and Pool E games in Ireland.

Wales hosted Pool D, also featuring Argentina, Samoa and Japan. Four of the pool games were at the Millennium Stadium, with one match each at Stradey Park, Llanelli's rugby stadium, and at The Racecourse, Wrexham, which usually featured Association Football.

Of eleven knock-out games, the Millennium Stadium only hosted three; Australia's defeat of Wales in the quarter-final stage, and the third place play-off and final. The other fixtures were played for at a variety of European venues.

The following Welsh stadiums were used:

City	Stadium	Capacity
(Wales) Cardiff	Millennium Stadium	74,500
(Wales) Wrexham	Racecourse Ground	15,500
(Wales) Llanelli	Stradey Park	10,800

=== Pool stage ===
1 October 1999

Wales	23–18	Argentina
Try: Colin Charvis; Mark Taylor; Con: Neil Jenkins (2); Pen: Neil Jenkins (3)		Pen: Gonzalo Quesada (6)

Millennium Stadium, Cardiff
Referee: Paddy O'Brien (New Zealand)

9 October 1999

Wales	64–15	Japan
Try: Mark Taylor (2); Robert Howley; Scott Gibbs; David Llewellyn; Gareth Thomas; Allan Bateman; Shane Howarth; Con: Neil Jenkins (8); Pen: Neil Jenkins		Try: Patiliai Tuidraki; Daisuke Ohata; Con: Keiji Hirose; Pen: Keiji Hirose

Millennium Stadium, Cardiff
Referee: Joel Dume (France)

14 October 1999

Wales	31–38	Samoa
Try: Gareth Thomas; Penalty try (2); Con: Neil Jenkins (2); Pen: Neil Jenkins (4)		Try: Stephen Bachop (2); Lio Falaniko; Pat Lam; Silao Leaega; Con: Silao Leaega; Pen: Silao Leaega

Millennium Stadium, Cardiff
Referee: Ed Morrison (England)

Team	Pld	W	D	L	PF	PA	PD	Pts
Wales	3	2	0	1	118	71	+47	7
Samoa	3	2	0	1	97	72	+25	7
Argentina	3	2	0	1	83	51	+32	7
Japan	3	0	0	3	36	140	−104	3

=== Knockout stage ===
==== Quarter-final ====
23 October 1999

Wales	9–24	Australia
Pen: Neil Jenkins (3)		Try: George Gregan (2); Ben Tune; Con: Matt Burke (3); Pen: Matt Burke

Millennium Stadium, Cardiff
Attendance: 74,499
Referee: Colin Hawke (New Zealand)

== 2003 Australia ==
=== Pool stage ===
12 October 2003

Wales	41–10	Canada
Try: Parker; Cooper; M. Jones; Charvis; Thomas; Con: Harris (5); Pen: Harris (2)		Try: Tkachuk; Con: Pritchard; Drop: Ross

Telstra Dome, Melbourne
Attendance: 24,874
Referee: Chris White (England)

19 October 2003

Wales	27–20	Tonga
Try: Cooper; M. Williams; Con: S. Jones; Pen: S. Jones (4); Drop: M. Williams		Try: Hola; Kivalu; Lavaka; Con: Hola; Pen: Hola

Canberra Stadium
Attendance: 19,806
Referee: Paul Honiss (New Zealand)

25 October 2003

Italy	15–27	Wales
Pen: Wakarua (5)		Try: M. Jones; Parker; D. Jones; Con: Harris (3); Pen: Harris (3)

Canberra Stadium
Attendance: 22,641
Referee: Andrew Cole (Australia)

2 November 2003

New Zealand	53–37	Wales
Try: Rokocoko (2); MacDonald; Williams; Howlett (2); Spencer; Mauger; Con: MacDonald (5); Pen: MacDonald		Try: Taylor; Parker; Charvis; S. Williams; Con: S. Jones (4); Pen: S. Jones (3)

Telstra Stadium, Sydney
Attendance: 80,012
Referee: André Watson (South Africa)

Team	Pld	W	D	L	PF	PA	PD	BP	Pts	Qualification
New Zealand	4	4	0	0	282	57	+225	4	20	Quarter-finals
Wales	4	3	0	1	132	98	+34	2	14	Quarter-finals
Italy	4	2	0	2	77	123	−46	0	8	
Canada	4	1	0	3	54	135	−81	1	5	
Tonga	4	0	0	4	46	178	−132	1	1	

=== Knockout stage ===
==== Quarter-final ====
9 November 2003

England	28–17	Wales
Try: Greenwood 44' c Con: Wilkinson; Pen: Wilkinson (6); Drop: Wilkinson 80+1'		Try: S. Jones 30' m Charvis 35' m M. Williams 71' c Con: Harris

Suncorp Stadium, Brisbane
Attendance: 45,252
Referee: Alain Rolland (Ireland)

== 2007 France ==
=== Hosting ===
In a more public bidding process, France beat England to win the right to host the 2007 World Cup. The WRU supported the French bid, in accordance with an agreement between the nations over the 1999 cup. As a result of that agreement, World Cup rugby returned to the Millennium Stadium for three pool matches (including two featuring Wales), and a quarter-final.

Ironically, as France were unexpected runners-up to Argentina in their group, the hosts found themselves competing in this, the only knock-out match held outside of their borders. The game was one of the highlights of the tournament, notable for a large number of reasons, though largely for being New Zealand's earliest exit from a Rugby World Cup, after the New Zealand Herald ran the hubristic headline 'France pose absolutely no threat to All Blacks'. The French squad's reply to the Haka, where the squad dressed in red, white and blue shirts, drew some attention, with a number of images of Sebastien Chabal's stony face appearing in the media the following day. Several controversial decisions by referee Wayne Barnes, provoked death threats from some fans. Statistical analysis by New Zealand company Verusco showed the match's playing time, that is time the ball is in play, was the longest of any of the 1,500 games they had ever recorded.

City	Country	Stadium	Capacity	Further reading
Cardiff	Wales	Millennium Stadium	73,350	Overview

=== Pool stage ===
Pos	Team	Pld	W	D	L	PF	PA	PD	B	Pts	Qualification
1	Australia	4	4	0	0	215	41	+174	4	20	Qualified for the quarter-finals
2	Fiji	4	3	0	1	114	136	−22	3	15	Qualified for the quarter-finals
3	Wales	4	2	0	2	168	105	+63	4	12	Eliminated, automatic qualification for RWC 2011
4	Japan	4	0	1	3	64	210	−146	1	3	
5	Canada	4	0	1	3	51	120	−69	0	2	

9 September 2007
14:00

Wales	42–17	Canada
Try: Parker 52' c A. W. Jones 58' c S. Williams (2) 61' m, 63' c Charvis 68' c Con: S. Jones (4/5); Pen: Hook (3/4) 10', 15', 21'	Report	Try: Cudmore 25' m Culpan 36' c Williams 45' m Con: Pritchard (1/3)

Stade de la Beaujoire, Nantes
Attendance: 37,500
Referee: Alain Rolland (Ireland)

15 September 2007
14:00

Wales	20–32	Australia
Try: J. Thomas 45' c S. Williams 76' c Con: Hook (2/2); Pen: S. Jones (1/3) 7'; Hook (1/2) 54'	Report	Try: Giteau 16' c Mortlock 35' m Latham (2) 40+' c, 60' c Con: Mortlock (2/2); Giteau (1/2); Pen: Mortlock (1/2) 2'; Drop: Barnes (1/1) 23'

Millennium Stadium, Cardiff
Attendance: 71,022
Referee: Steve Walsh (New Zealand)

20 September 2007
21:00

Wales	72–18	Japan
Try: A. W. Jones 11' c Hook 24' c R. Thomas 31' c Morgan 40+' m Phillips 42' c S. Williams (2) 48' m, 80' m D. James 52' c Cooper 59' c M. Williams (2) 64' c, 74' c Con: S. Jones (5/7); Sweeney (2/4); Pen: S. Jones (1/1) 23'	Report	Try: Endo 19' m Onozawa 57' c Con: Robins (1/1); Pen: Onishi (2/2) 4', 37'

Millennium Stadium, Cardiff
Attendance: 35,245
Referee: Joël Jutge (France)

29 September 2007
17:00

Wales	34–38	Fiji
Try: Popham 34' c S. Williams 45' c G. Thomas 48' m M. Jones 51' c M. Williams 73' m Con: Hook (1/1); S. Jones (2/4); Pen: S. Jones (1/2) 5'	Report	Try: Qera 16' c Delasau 19' m Leawere 25' c Dewes 77' c Con: Little (3/4); Pen: Little (4/5) 21', 24', 54', 60'

Stade de la Beaujoire, Nantes
Attendance: 37,080
Referee: Stuart Dickinson (Australia)

== 2011 New Zealand ==
=== Pool stage ===
11 September 2011
20:30

South Africa	17–16	Wales
Try: F. Steyn 3' c Hougaard 65' c Con: M. Steyn (2/2); Pen: M. Steyn (1/1) 20'	Report	Try: Faletau 54' c Con: Hook (1/1); Pen: Hook (3/5) 10', 32', 50'

Wellington Regional Stadium, Wellington
Attendance: 33,331
Referee: Wayne Barnes (England)

18 September 2011
15:30

Wales	17–10	Samoa
Try: Sh. Williams 67' m Pen: Hook (2/3) 12', 27'; Priestland (2/2) 43', 66'	Report	Try: Perenise 40+' c Con: Williams (1/1); Pen: Williams (1/3) 21'

Waikato Stadium, Hamilton
Attendance: 30,804
Referee: Alain Rolland (Ireland)

26 September 2011
19:30

Wales	81–7	Namibia
Try: Sc. Williams (3) 8' m, 47' c, 70' c Brew 14' c Faletau 18' c Jenkins 50' c North (2) 61' c, 66' c J. Davies 62' c L. Williams 75' m Byrne 77' m A.W. Jones 80+' c Con: S. Jones (6/7); Priestland (3/5); Pen: S. Jones (1/1) 3'	Report	Try: Koll 53' c Con: Kotzé (1/1)

Stadium Taranaki, New Plymouth
Attendance: 13,710
Referee: Steve Walsh (Australia)

2 October 2011
18:00

Wales	66–0	Fiji
Try: Roberts (2) 6' c, 51' c Sc. Williams 17' c North 32' c Warburton 39' c Burns 59' c Halfpenny 68' c L. Williams 73' c J. Davies 80+' c Con: Priestland (5/5); S. Jones (4/4); Pen: Priestland (1/1) 21'	Report

Waikato Stadium, Hamilton
Attendance: 28,476
Referee: Wayne Barnes (England)

Pos	Team	Pld	W	D	L	PF	PA	PD	T	B	Pts	Qualification
1	South Africa	4	4	0	0	166	24	+142	21	2	18	Advanced to the quarter-finals and qualified for the 2015 Rugby World Cup
2	Wales	4	3	0	1	180	34	+146	23	3	15	Advanced to the quarter-finals and qualified for the 2015 Rugby World Cup
3	Samoa	4	2	0	2	91	49	+42	9	2	10	Eliminated but qualified for 2015 Rugby World Cup
4	Fiji	4	1	0	3	59	167	−108	7	1	5	
5	Namibia	4	0	0	4	44	266	−222	5	0	0	

=== Knockout stage ===
==== Quarter-final ====
8 October 2011
18:00 NZDT (UTC+13)

Ireland	10–22	Wales
Try: Earls 45' c Con: O'Gara (1/1); Pen: O'Gara (1/1) 24'	Report	Try: Williams 3' c Phillips 51' m J. Davies 64' c Con: Priestland (2/3); Pen: Halfpenny (1/1) 29'

Wellington Regional Stadium, Wellington
Attendance: 35,787
Referee: Craig Joubert (South Africa)

==== Semi-final ====
15 October 2011
21:00 NZDT (UTC+13)

Wales	8–9	France
Try: Phillips 58' m Pen: Hook (1/3) 8'	Report	Pen: Parra (3/3) 22', 35', 51'

Eden Park, Auckland
Attendance: 58,630
Referee: Alain Rolland (Ireland)

==== Bronze medal match ====
21 October 2011
20:30 NZDT (UTC+13)

Wales	18–21	Australia
Try: Shane Williams 50' m Halfpenny 80+' c Con: S. Jones (1/1); Pen: Hook (1/2) 20'; S. Jones (1/1) 71'	Report	Try: Barnes 12' c McCalman 76' m Con: O'Connor (1/2); Pen: O'Connor (2/4) 54', 58'; Drop: Barnes (1/1) 68'

Eden Park, Auckland
Attendance: 53,014
Referee: Wayne Barnes (England)

== 2015 England ==
=== Hosting ===
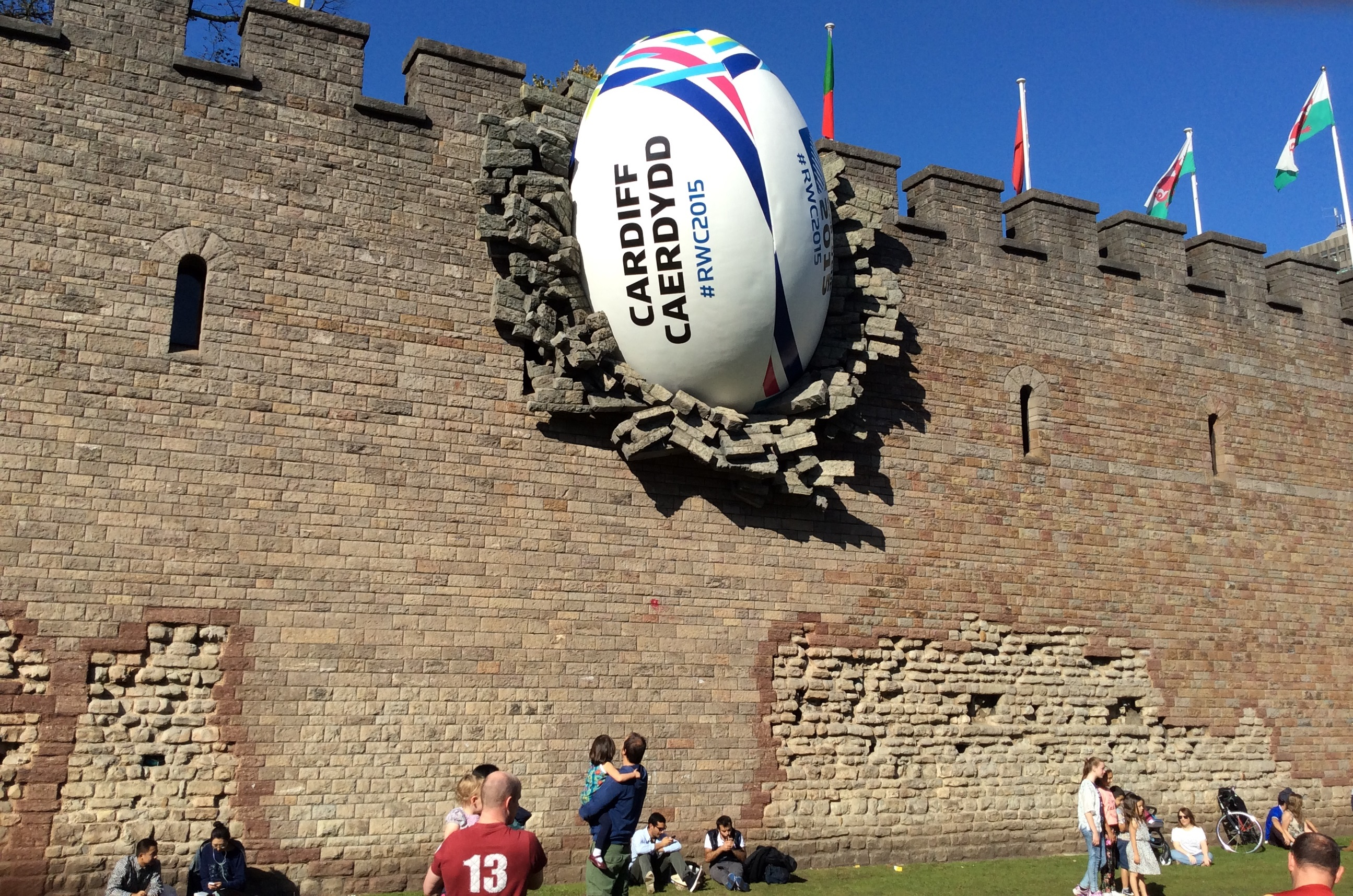
A giant promotional rugby ball was placed on Cardiff Castle as part of the 2015 Rugby World Cup

In 2009 England were awarded the rights to stage the 2015 tournament. Owing to the proximity of Cardiff, the RFU made it clear that they intended to use the Millennium Stadium as part of its bid, despite initial reluctance from the IRB for multiple hosting nations. The Millennium Stadium hosted eight games in the tournament, more than in any previous world cup. These include two quarter-finals. This made Cardiff the only venue hosting knock-out matches with the exception of England's national stadium, Twickenham, as well as the venue with the second highest number of games. As Wales and England were drawn in the same group, Wales only had home advantage for two of their games, against Uruguay and Fiji.

Cardiff used the World Cup to promote tourism in the city, with estimates that the games would add over £300 million to the local economy. A 'Fan Zone' had been created within the grounds of Cardiff Arms Park with a large screen, for enjoying match days. Cardiff Council has commissioned an art installation to mark the tournament, grafting a rugby ball to the prominent Cardiff Castle, to make it appear the ball has smashed straight through the wall. This was similar to a publicity stunt from the 2007 World Cup, where a rugby ball hung from the centre of the Eiffel Tower. No other such sculptures had been created in the other 2015 venue cities.

City	Country	Stadium	Capacity	Further reading
Cardiff	Wales	Millennium Stadium	73,350	Overview

=== Pool stage ===
20 September 2015
14:30

Wales	54–9	Uruguay
Try: Lee 15' c Allen (3) 19' c, 30' c, 40' c Amos 50' c Davies (2) 60' m, 80' c Tipuric 71' c Con: Priestland (7/8) 16', 19', 30', 40', 51', 72', 80'	Report	Pen: Berchesi (3/4) 2', 9', 24'

Millennium Stadium, Cardiff
Attendance: 71,887
Referee: Romain Poite (France)

26 September 2015
20:00

England	25–28	Wales
Try: May 27' c Con: Farrell (1/1) 29'; Pen: Farrell (5/5) 12', 24', 44', 52', 69'; Drop: Farrell 18'	Report	Try: G. Davies 71' c Con: Biggar (1/1) 72'; Pen: Biggar (7/7) 3', 16', 40', 48', 54', 59', 75'

Twickenham Stadium, London
Attendance: 81,129
Referee: Jérôme Garcès (France)

1 October 2015
16:45

Wales	23–13	Fiji
Try: G. Davies 7' c Baldwin 32' c Con: Biggar (2/2) 8', 34'; Pen: Biggar (3/3) 21', 55', 69'	Report	Try: Goneva 49' c Con: Volavola (1/1) 50'; Pen: Volavola (2/2) 14', 38'

Millennium Stadium, Cardiff
Attendance: 71,576
Referee: John Lacey (Ireland)

10 October 2015
16:45

Australia	15–6	Wales
Pen: Foley (5/6) 25', 31', 37', 51', 73'	Report	Pen: Biggar (2/3) 5', 34'

Twickenham Stadium, London
Attendance: 80,863
Referee: Craig Joubert (South Africa)

Pos	Team	Pld	W	D	L	PF	PA	PD	T	B	Pts	Qualification
1	Australia	4	4	0	0	141	35	+106	17	1	17	Advanced to the quarter-finals and qualified for the 2019 Rugby World Cup
2	Wales	4	3	0	1	111	62	+49	11	1	13	Advanced to the quarter-finals and qualified for the 2019 Rugby World Cup
3	England	4	2	0	2	133	75	+58	16	3	11	Eliminated but qualified for 2019 Rugby World Cup
4	Fiji	4	1	0	3	84	101	−17	10	1	5	
5	Uruguay	4	0	0	4	30	226	−196	2	0	0	

=== Knockout stage ===
==== Quarter-final ====
17 October 2015
16:00 BST (UTC+01)

South Africa	23–19	Wales
Try: Du Preez 75' m Pen: Pollard (5/7) 9', 13', 17', 21', 62'; Drop: Pollard 52'	Report	Try: G. Davies 18' c Con: Biggar (1/1) 19'; Pen: Biggar (3/4) 15', 47', 64'; Drop: Biggar 40'

Twickenham Stadium, London
Attendance: 79,572
Referee: Wayne Barnes (England)

== 2019 Japan ==
=== Pool stage ===
Pos	Team	Pld	W	D	L	PF	PA	PD	T	B	Pts	Qualification
1	Wales	4	4	0	0	136	69	+67	17	3	19	Advanced to the quarter-finals and qualified for the 2023 Rugby World Cup
2	Australia	4	3	0	1	136	68	+68	20	4	16	Advanced to the quarter-finals and qualified for the 2023 Rugby World Cup
3	Fiji	4	1	0	3	110	108	+2	17	3	7	Eliminated but qualified for 2023 Rugby World Cup
4	Georgia	4	1	0	3	65	122	−57	9	1	5	
5	Uruguay	4	1	0	3	60	140	−80	6	0	4	

23 September 2019
19:15 JST (UTC+09)

(1 BP) Wales	43–14	Georgia
Try: J. Davies 3' m Tipuric 13' c Adams 19' c L. Williams 40' c T. Williams 65' c North 76' c Con: Biggar (4/5) 14', 20', 40', 66'; Halfpenny (1/1) 77'; Pen: Biggar (1/1) 7'	Report	Try: Mamukashvili 43' c Chilachava 69' c Con: Abzhandadze (2/2) 44', 70'

City of Toyota Stadium, Toyota
Attendance: 35,546
Referee: Luke Pearce (England)

29 September 2019
16:45 JST (UTC+09)

(1 BP) Australia	25–29	Wales
Try: Ashley-Cooper 21' m Haylett-Petty 46' c Hooper 62' c Con: To'omua (2/2) 48', 63'; Pen: Foley (1/1) 29'; To'omua (1/1) 68'	Report	Try: Parkes 13' c G. Davies 38' c Con: Biggar (1/1) 14'; Patchell (1/1) 39'; Pen: Patchell (3/3) 33', 37', 72'; Drop: Biggar (1/2) 1'; Patchell (1/1) 44'

Tokyo Stadium, Chōfu
Attendance: 47,885
Referee: Romain Poite (France)

9 October 2019
18:45 JST (UTC+09)

(1 BP) Wales	29–17	Fiji
Try: Adams (3) 18' c, 31' c, 61' m L. Williams 69' m Con: Biggar (2/2) 20', 32'; Pen: Patchell (1/1) 58'	Report	Try: Tuisova 4' m Murimurivalu 9' m Penalty try 54'

Oita Stadium, Ōita
Attendance: 33,379
Referee: Jérôme Garcès (France)

13 October 2019
17:15 JST (UTC+09)

(1 BP) Wales	35–13	Uruguay
Try: Smith 17' c Adams 49' c Penalty try 66'; T Williams 74' c G. Davies 85' c Con: Halfpenny (4/4) 18' 50' 75' 86'	Report	Try: Kessler 71' c Con: Berchesi 72'; Pen: Berchesi (2/2) 22' 39'

Kumamoto Stadium, Kumamoto
Attendance: 27,317
Referee: Angus Gardner (Australia)

=== Knockout stage ===
==== Quarter-final ====
20 October 2019
16:15 JST (UTC+09)

Wales	20–19	France
Try: Wainwright 12' c Moriarty 74' c Con: Biggar (2/2) 13' 75'; Pen: Biggar (2/2) 20' 54'	Report	Try: Vahaamahina 5' m Ollivon 8' c Vakatawa 31' c Con: Ntamack (2/3) 9' 32'

Ōita Stadium, Ōita
Attendance: 34,426
Referee: Jaco Peyper (South Africa)

==== Semi-final ====
27 October 2019
18:00 JST (UTC+09)

Wales	16–19	South Africa
Try: Adams 65' c Con: Halfpenny (1/1) 66'; Pen: Biggar (3/3) 18', 39', 46'	Report	Try: de Allende 57' c Con: Pollard (1/1) 58'; Pen: Pollard (4/4) 15', 20', 35', 76'

International Stadium Yokohama, Yokohama
Attendance: 67,750
Referee: Jérôme Garcès (France)

==== Bronze final ====
1 November 2019
18:00 JST (UTC+09)

New Zealand	40–17	Wales
Try: Moody 5' c B. Barrett 13' c B. Smith (2) 33' c, 40+1' c Crotty 42' c Mo'unga 76' m Con: Mo'unga (5/6) 7', 14', 34', 40+2', 44'	Report	Try: Amos 19' c Adams 59' c Con: Patchell (1/1) 21'; Biggar (1/1) 61'; Pen: Patchell (1/1) 27'

Tokyo Stadium, Chōfu
Attendance: 48,842
Referee: Wayne Barnes (England)

== By opponent ==
Opponent	Played	Won	Drawn	Lost	For	Against	% Won
Argentina	3	2	0	1	56	54	66.67
Australia	8	3	0	5	147	182	37.5
Canada	3	3	0	0	123	36	100
England	3	2	0	1	61	56	66.67
Fiji	5	4	0	1	184	94	80
France	2	1	0	1	28	28	50
Georgia	2	2	0	0	86	33	100
Ireland	3	2	0	1	58	40	66.67
Italy	1	1	0	0	27	15	100
Japan	3	3	0	0	193	43	100
Namibia	1	1	0	0	81	7	100
New Zealand	4	0	0	4	69	176	0
Portugal	1	1	0	0	28	8	100
Samoa	3	1	0	2	61	64	33.33
South Africa	3	0	0	3	35	40	0
Tonga	2	2	0	0	56	36	100
Uruguay	2	2	0	0	89	22	100
Total	49	30	0	19	1382	934	61.22
