= Tonga at the Rugby World Cup =

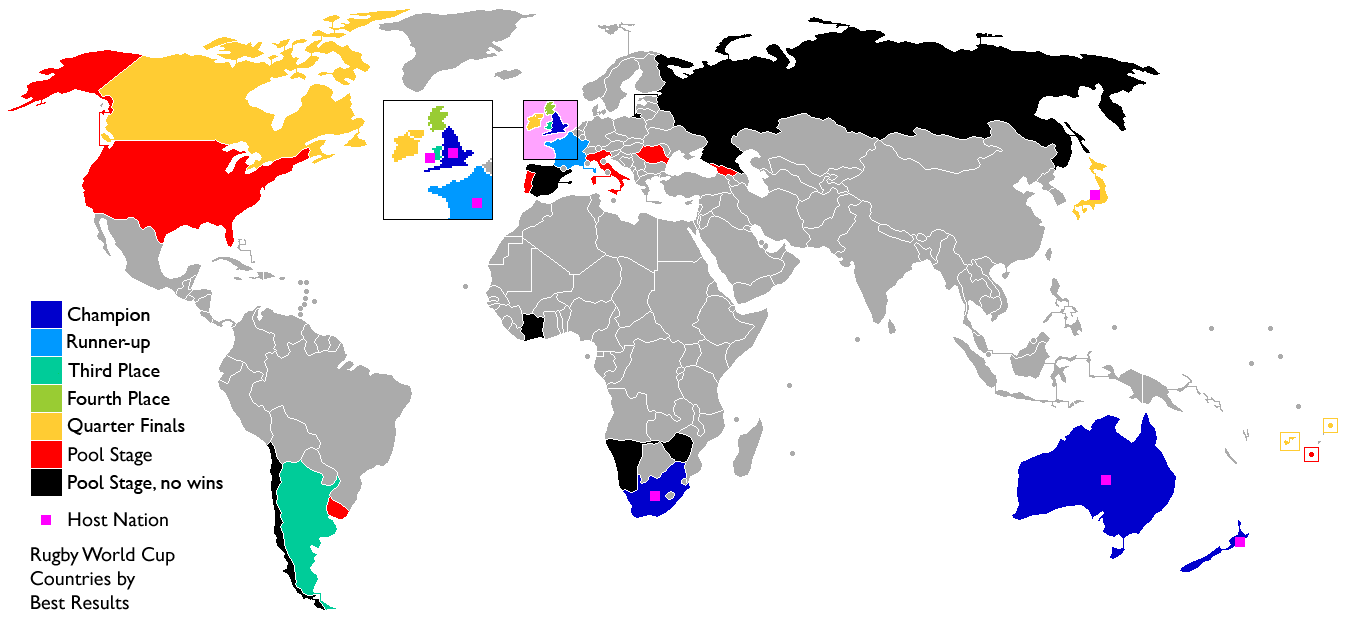
Map of nations best results, excluding nations which unsuccessfully participated in qualifying tournaments.

The Tonga national rugby union team has played in all Rugby World Cup tournaments, except in 1991, when they did not qualify. Their best performances were in the 2007 and 2011 tournaments, when they won two matches. Their best single match win was an upset victory in 2011 over eventual finalists France.

Nation	Number of appearances	First appearance	Most recent appearance	Streak	Best result
Tonga	9	1987	2023	8	Two wins (2007, 2011)

== By position ==
Rugby World Cup record										Qualification						
Year	Round	Pld	W	D	L	PF	PA	Squad	Head coach	Pos	Pld	W	D	L	PF	PA
(New Zealand) (Australia) 1987	Pool stage	3	0	0	3	29	98	Squad	V. Tuku'aho	Invited						
(England) (France) (Ireland) (Scotland) (Wales) 1991	Did not qualify									3rd	3	1	0	2	64	62
(South Africa) 1995	Pool stage	3	1	0	2	44	90	Squad	F. Valu	P/O	2	1	0	1	34	26
(Wales) 1999	Pool stage	3	1	0	2	47	171	Squad	P. Tu'ihalamaka	P/O	7	2	0	5	317	241
(Australia) 2003	Pool stage	4	0	0	4	46	178	Squad	J. Love	P/O	8	4	0	4	398	178
(France) 2007	Pool stage	4	2	0	2	89	96	Squad	Q. Fielea	P/O	7	3	0	4	329	136
(New Zealand) 2011	Pool stage	4	2	0	2	80	98	Squad	I. Maka	Automatically qualified						
(England) 2015	Pool stage	4	1	0	3	70	130	Squad	M. Otai	Automatically qualified						
(Japan) 2019	Pool stage	4	1	0	3	67	105	Squad	T. Kefu	2nd	4	1	0	3	68	93
(France) 2023	Pool stage	4	1	0	3	96	177	Squad	T. Kefu	P/O	4	2	0	2	126	111
(Australia) 2027	To be determined									To be determined						
(United States) 2031	To be determined									To be determined						
Total	—	33	9	0	24	568	1143	—	—	—	35	14	0	21	1336	847
Champions; Runners–up; Third place; Fourth place; Home venue

== By match ==
=== 1987 Rugby World Cup ===
Pool 2 games -

Team	Pld	W	D	L	PF	PA	PD	T	Pts	Qualification
Wales	3	3	0	0	82	31	+51	13	6	Knockout stage
Ireland	3	2	0	1	84	41	+43	11	4	Knockout stage
Canada	3	1	0	2	65	90	−25	8	2	
Tonga	3	0	0	3	29	98	−69	3	0	

24 May 1987

Canada	37–4	Tonga
Try: Palmer (2); Vaesen (2); Stuart; Frame; Penalty try Con: Wyatt (2); Gareth Rees; Pen: Rees	Report	Try: Valu

McLean Park, Napier
Attendance: 7,000
Referee: Clive Norling (Wales)

29 May 1987

Tonga	16–29	Wales
Try: Fielea; Fifita; Con: Liavaʻa; Pen: Liava'a; Amone	Report	Try: Webbe (3); Hadley; Con: Thorburn (2); Pen: Thorburn (2); Drop: Davies

Showgrounds Oval, Palmerston North
Attendance: 19,000
Referee: Dave Bishop (New Zealand)

3 June 1987

Ireland	32–9	Tonga
Try: Mullin (3); MacNeill (2); Con: Ward (3); Pen: Ward (2)	Report	Pen: Amone (3)

Ballymore, Brisbane
Attendance: 4,000
Referee: Guy Maurette (France)

=== 1995 Rugby World Cup ===
Pool D games -

Team	Pld	W	D	L	PF	PA	PD	Pts
France	3	3	0	0	114	47	+67	9
Scotland	3	2	0	1	149	27	+122	7
Tonga	3	1	0	2	44	90	−46	5
Ivory Coast	3	0	0	3	29	172	−143	3

26 May 1995

France	38–10	Tonga
Try: Lacroix (2); Hueber; Saint-André; Con: Lacroix (3); Pen: Lacroix (3); Drop: Delaigue		Try: Vaʻenuku; Con: Tuipulotu; Pen: Tuipulotu

Loftus Versfeld Stadium, Pretoria
Attendance: 25,000
Referee: Steve Lander (England)

30 May 1995

Scotland	41–5	Tonga
Try: S. Hastings; Peters; G. Hastings; Con: G. Hastings; Pen: G. Hastings (8)		Try: Fenukitau

Loftus Versfeld Stadium, Pretoria
Attendance: 21,000
Referee: Barry Leask (Australia)

3 June 1995

Ivory Coast	11–29	Tonga
Try: Okou; Pen: Dali (2)		Try: Otai; Tuipulotu; Latukefu; Con: Tuipulotu (3); Pen: Tuipulotu

Olympia Park, Rustenburg
Attendance: 16,000
Referee: Don Reordan (United States)

=== 1999 Rugby World Cup ===
Pool B games -

Team	Pld	W	D	L	PF	PA	PD	Pts
New Zealand	3	3	0	0	176	28	+148	9
England	3	2	0	1	184	47	+137	7
Tonga	3	1	0	2	47	171	−124	5
Italy	3	0	0	3	35	196	−161	3

3 October 1999

New Zealand	45–9	Tonga
Try: Lomu (2), Kelleher, Maxwell, Kronfeld; Con: Mehrtens (4); Pen: Mehrtens (4)		Pen: Taumalolo (3)

Ashton Gate, Bristol
Attendance: 21,000
Referee: Derek Bevan (Wales)

10 October 1999

Italy	25–28	Tonga
Try: Moscardi; Con: Domínguez; Pen: Domínguez (6)		Try: Taufahema; Fatani; Tuipulotu; Con: Tuipulotu (2); Pen: Tuipulotu (2); Drop: Tuipulotu

Welford Road Stadium, Leicester
Referee: David McHugh (Ireland)

15 October 1999

England	101–10	Tonga
Try: Guscott (2); Greening (2); Luger (2); Healey (2); Greenwood (2); Dawson; Perry; Hill; Con: Grayson (12); Pen: Grayson (4)		Try: Tiueti; Con: Tuipulotu; Pen: Tuipulotu

Twickenham Stadium, London
Attendance: 72,485
Referee: Wayne Erickson (Australia)

=== 2003 Rugby World Cup ===
Group D games-

Team	Pld	W	D	L	PF	PA	PD	BP	Pts	Qualification
New Zealand	4	4	0	0	282	57	+225	4	20	Quarter-finals
Wales	4	3	0	1	132	98	+34	2	14	Quarter-finals
Italy	4	2	0	2	77	123	−46	0	8	
Canada	4	1	0	3	54	135	−81	1	5	
Tonga	4	0	0	4	46	178	−132	1	1	

15 October 2003

Italy	36–12	Tonga
Try: M. Dallan; D. Dallan (2); Con: Wakarua (3); Pen: Wakarua (5)		Try: Payne; Tuʻifua; Con: Tuipulotu

Canberra Stadium, Canberra
Attendance: 18,967
Referee: Steve Walsh (New Zealand)

19 October 2003

Wales	27–20	Tonga
Try: Cooper; M. Williams; Con: S. Jones; Pen: S. Jones (4); Drop: M. Williams		Try: Hola; Kivalu; Lavaka; Con: Hola; Pen: Hola

Canberra Stadium, Canberra
Attendance: 19,806
Referee: Paul Honiss (New Zealand)

24 October 2003

New Zealand	91–7	Tonga
Try: Braid; Carter; Flynn; Ralph (2); Spencer; Meeuws; Penalty try Muliaina (2); MacDonald; Howlett (2); Con: MacDonald (12); Spencer		Try: Hola; Con: Tuipulotu

Lang Park, Brisbane
Attendance: 47,588
Referee: Pablo De Luca (Argentina)

2003-10-29

Canada	24–7	Tonga
Try: Fauth; Abrams; Con: Pritchard; Pen: Ross (4)		Try: Kivalu; Con: Hola

Wollongong Showground, Wollongong
Attendance: 15,630
Referee: Alain Rolland (Ireland)

=== 2007 Rugby World Cup ===
Pos	Team	Pld	W	D	L	PF	PA	PD	B	Pts	Qualification
1	South Africa	4	4	0	0	189	47	+142	3	19	Advanced to the quarter-finals and qualified for the 2011 Rugby World Cup
2	England	4	3	0	1	108	88	+20	2	14	Advanced to the quarter-finals and qualified for the 2011 Rugby World Cup
3	Tonga	4	2	0	2	89	96	−7	1	9	Eliminated, automatic qualification for 2011 Rugby World Cup
4	Samoa	4	1	0	3	69	143	−74	1	5	
5	United States	4	0	0	4	61	142	−81	1	1	

12 September 2007
14:00

United States	15–25	Tonga
Try: MacDonald 47' m Stanfill 67' c Con: Hercus (1/2); Pen: Hercus (1/2) 33'	Report	Try: Maka 2' c Vaka 59' m Vaki 70' c Con: Hola (2/3); Pen: Hola (2/2) 7', 26'

Stade de la Mosson, Montpellier
Attendance: 25,000
Referee: Stuart Dickinson (Australia)

16 September 2007
16:00

Samoa	15–19	Tonga
Pen: Williams (5/6) 6', 21', 23', 29', 69'	Report	Try: Taione 60' c Con: Hola (1/1); Pen: Hola (4/5) 3', 38', 47', 67'

Stade de la Mosson, Montpellier
Attendance: 24,128
Referee: Jonathan Kaplan (South Africa)

22 September 2007
14:00

South Africa	30–25	Tonga
Try: Pienaar (2) 18' c, 65' m Smith 59' c Skinstad 62' m Con: Pretorius (1/1); Montgomery (1/3); Pen: Steyn (1/1) 54'; Montgomery (1/1) 76'	Report	Try: Pulu 44' c Hufanga 70' m Vaki 72' c Con: Hola (2/3); Pen: Hola (2/3) 9', 78'

Stade Félix Bollaert, Lens
Attendance: 40,069
Referee: Wayne Barnes (England)

28 September 2007
21:00

England	36–20	Tonga
Try: Sackey (2) 20' m, 38' m Tait 57' c Farrell 66' c Con: Wilkinson (2/4); Pen: Wilkinson (2/3) 14', 36'; Drop: Wilkinson (2/2) 32', 72'	Report	Try: Hufanga 17' c T-Pole 80' c Con: Hola (2/2); Pen: Hola (2/2) 11', 55'

Parc des Princes, Paris
Attendance: 45,085
Referee: Alain Rolland (Ireland)

=== 2011 Rugby World Cup ===
Tonga played in Pool A. After losing to New Zealand and Canada, they beat Japan and then had an upset victory over eventual finalists France, their greatest World Cup match result to date.

Pos	Team	Pld	W	D	L	PF	PA	PD	T	B	Pts	Qualification
1	New Zealand	4	4	0	0	240	49	+191	36	4	20	Advanced to the quarter-finals and qualified for the 2015 Rugby World Cup
2	France	4	2	0	2	124	96	+28	13	3	11	Advanced to the quarter-finals and qualified for the 2015 Rugby World Cup
3	Tonga	4	2	0	2	80	98	−18	7	1	9	Eliminated but qualified for 2015 Rugby World Cup
4	Canada	4	1	1	2	82	168	−86	9	0	6	
5	Japan	4	0	1	3	69	184	−115	8	0	2	

9 September 2011	New Zealand	41–10	Tonga	Eden Park, Auckland
14 September 2011	Tonga	20–25	Canada	Northland Events Centre, Whangarei
21 September 2011	Tonga	31–18	Japan	Northland Events Centre, Whangarei
1 October 2011	France	14–19	Tonga	Wellington Regional Stadium, Wellington

=== 2015 Rugby World Cup ===
Pool C

Pos	Team	Pld	W	D	L	PF	PA	PD	T	B	Pts	Qualification
1	New Zealand	4	4	0	0	174	49	+125	25	3	19	Advanced to the quarter-finals and qualified for the 2019 Rugby World Cup
2	Argentina	4	3	0	1	179	70	+109	22	3	15	Advanced to the quarter-finals and qualified for the 2019 Rugby World Cup
3	Georgia	4	2	0	2	53	123	−70	5	0	8	Eliminated but qualified for 2019 Rugby World Cup
4	Tonga	4	1	0	3	70	130	−60	8	2	6	
5	Namibia	4	0	0	4	70	174	−104	8	1	1	

19 September 2015	Tonga	10–17	Georgia	Kingsholm Stadium, Gloucester
29 September 2015	Tonga	35–21	Namibia	Sandy Park, Exeter
4 October 2015	Argentina	45–16	Tonga	King Power Stadium, Leicester
9 October 2015	New Zealand	47–9	Tonga	St James' Park, Newcastle

=== 2019 Rugby World Cup ===
Pos	Team	Pld	W	D	L	PF	PA	PD	T	B	Pts	Qualification
1	England	4	3	1	0	119	20	+99	17	3	17	Advanced to the quarter-finals and qualified for the 2023 Rugby World Cup
2	France	4	3	1	0	79	51	+28	9	1	15	Advanced to the quarter-finals and qualified for the 2023 Rugby World Cup
3	Argentina	4	2	0	2	106	91	+15	14	3	11	Eliminated but qualified for 2023 Rugby World Cup
4	Tonga	4	1	0	3	67	105	−38	9	2	6	
5	United States	4	0	0	4	52	156	−104	7	0	0	

22 September 2019
19:15 JST (UTC+09)

(1 BP) England	35–3	Tonga
Try: Tuilagi (2) 24' m, 31' c George 57' c Cowan-Dickie 77' c Con: Farrell (3/4) 33', 58', 78'; Pen: Farrell (3/3) 11', 37', 43'	Report	Pen: Takulua (1/1) 15'

Sapporo Dome, Sapporo
Attendance: 35,923
Referee: Paul Williams (New Zealand)

28 September 2019
13:45 JST (UTC+09)

(1 BP) Argentina	28–12	Tonga
Try: Montoya (3) 7' c, 17' c, 26' c Carreras 20' c Con: Urdapilleta (4/4) 9', 19', 21', 28'	Report	Try: Veainu (2) 30' c, 66' m Con: Takulua (1/2) 32'

Hanazono Rugby Stadium, Higashiōsaka
Attendance: 21,971
Referee: Jaco Peyper (South Africa)

6 October 2019
16:45 JST (UTC+09)

France	23–21	Tonga (1 BP)
Try: Vakatawa 6' c Raka 32' c Con: Ntamack (2/2) 7', 34'; Pen: Ntamack (3/4) 4', 52', 60'	Report	Try: Takulua 40' c Hingano 47' c Kapeli 79' c Con: Takulua (2/2) 40'+1, 49'; Fosita (1/1) 80'

Egao Kenko Stadium, Kumamoto
Attendance: 28,477
Referee: Nic Berry (Australia)

13 October 2019
14:45 JST (UTC+09)

United States	19–31	Tonga (1 BP)
Try: Te'o (2) 21' c, 26' m Lamborn 77' c Con: MacGinty (2/3) 22', 78'	Report	Try: Fisiihoi 17' c Hingano 58' c Piutau 62' c Veainu 80'+1 c Con: Takulua (2/2) 19', 60'; Faiva (1/1) 64'; Piutau (1/1) 80+2'; Pen: Takulua (1/1) 51'

Hanazono Rugby Stadium, Higashiōsaka
Attendance: 22,012
Referee: Nigel Owens (Wales)

=== 2023 Rugby World Cup ===
Pos	Team	Pld	W	D	L	PF	PA	PD	TF	TA	B	Pts	Qualification
1	Ireland	4	4	0	0	190	46	+144	27	5	3	19	Advance to knockout stage, and qualification to the 2027 Men's Rugby World Cup
2	South Africa	4	3	0	1	151	34	+117	22	4	3	15	Advance to knockout stage, and qualification to the 2027 Men's Rugby World Cup
3	Scotland	4	2	0	2	146	71	+75	21	10	2	10	Qualification to the 2027 Men's Rugby World Cup
4	Tonga	4	1	0	3	96	177	−81	13	25	1	5	
5	Romania	4	0	0	4	32	287	−255	4	43	0	0	

Source: World Rugby
Rules for classification: Pool stage tiebreakers

16 September 2023
21:00 CEST (UTC+2)

(1 BP) Ireland	59–16	Tonga
Try: Beirne 21' c Doris 27' c Hansen 33' c Sexton 38' c Lowe 59' c Aki (2) 63' c, 69' c Herring 80' c Con: Sexton (4/4) 22', 28', 34', 39'; Byrne (4/4) 60', 64', 70', 80+2'; Pen: Sexton (1/1) 7'	Report	Try: V. Fifita 40+8' c Con: Havili (1/1) 40+9'; Pen: Havili (3/3) 16', 25', 43'

Stade de la Beaujoire, Nantes
Attendance: 31,673
Referee: Wayne Barnes (England)

24 September 2023
17:45 CEST (UTC+2)

(1 BP) Scotland	45–17	Tonga
Try: Turner 5' c Van der Merwe 27' m Steyn 30' m Darge 40+2' c Horne 54' c Kinghorn 68' c Graham 80+2' c Con: Russell (5/7) 6', 40+3', 55', 70', 80+3'	Report	Try: Kata 20' c Tameifuna 44' c Con: Havili (2/2) 21', 45'; Pen: Havili (1/1) 10'

Stade de Nice, Nice
Attendance: 33,189
Referee: Karl Dickson (England)

1 October 2023
21:00 CEST (UTC+2)

(1 BP) South Africa	49–18	Tonga
Try: Reinach 5' c Moodie 20' c Fourie 32' c Kriel 49' c Le Roux 58' c Van Staden 63' c Smith 80+1' c Con: Pollard (4/4) 6', 21', 33', 51'; Libbok (3/3) 59', 65', 80+2'	Report	Try: Tameifuna 38' m Inisi 54' m Pellegrini 73' m Pen: Havili (1/1) 3'

Stade Vélodrome, Marseille
Attendance: 60,387
Referee: Luke Pearce (England)

8 October 2023
17:45 CEST (UTC+2)

(1 BP) Tonga	45–24	Romania
Try: Kata (2) 11' c, 66' m Moala 15' c Taumoepeau 22' c Vailanu 49' c Ahki 62' c Taumoefolau 71' m Con: Havili (5/7) 13', 17', 23', 51', 63'	Report	Try: Boboc 30' c Surugiu 36' c Simionescu 55' c Con: Conache (3/3) 32', 37', 57'; Pen: Conache (1/2) 19'

Stade Pierre-Mauroy, Villeneuve-d'Ascq
Attendance: 45,042
Referee: Angus Gardner (Australia)
