= Amone =

Amone is a name. Notable people with the name include:

- Amone Afu (born c. 1957), Tongan rugby union player
- Asa Amone (born 1966), Tongan rugby union and rugby league footballer
- Junior Amone (born 2002), Tonga rugby league footballer
- Siosifa Amone (born 2002), Australian rugby union player
- Tevita Amone (born 1980), Tongan rugby league footballer
- Tom Amone (born 1996), Australian rugby league footballer
