= Liavaʻa =

Liavaʻa is a Tongan surname. Notable people with this surname include:

- Alamoni Liavaʻa (born circa 1959), Tongan former rugby union player
- Josh Liava'a (1948-2014), former New Zealand rugby league player
- Taliaʻuli Liavaʻa (born circa 1950), Tongan former rugby union player
- Talite Liavaʻa (born 1971), Tongan former rugby league player
