= Talanoa =

Talanoa may refer to:

== People ==
- Talanoa Hufanga (born 2000), American football player
- Talanoa Kitekeiʻaho (born 1958), Tongan rugby union player
- Fetuli Talanoa (born 1987), Tonga rugby league player

== Other uses ==
- Talanoa Dialogue, 2017–2018 process within global climate change discussions
