= Fusimalohi =

Fusimalohi is a surname. Notable people with the surname include:

- Liueli Fusimalohi (born c. 1966), Tongan rugby union player
- Taniela Fusimalohi, Tongan politician
