= John Lecky =

John Lecky can refer to:

- John Lecky (rower)
- John Lecky (rugby union, born 1863)
- John Lecky (rugby union, born 1960)
