= Tony Doyle =

Tony Doyle may refer to:

- Tony Doyle (actor) (1935–2000), Irish television and film actor
- Tony Doyle (cyclist) (1958–2023), English cycle frame builder and former professional cyclist
- Tony Doyle (politician) (1953–1994), Australian politician
- Tony Doyle (rugby union) (born 1958), Irish rugby union player
