= Vaeno =

Vaeno or Vaʻeno is a surname. Notable people with the surname include:

- Latu Vaeno (born 1995), Tongan-born, New Zealand rugby union player
- Latu Vaʻeno (born c. 1959), Tongan rugby union player
