= Derek McGrath (disambiguation) =

Derek McGrath is an actor.

Derek McGrath may also refer to:

- Derek McGrath (footballer) (born 1972), Irish footballer
- Derek McGrath (hurler) (born 1976), Irish hurler
- Derek McGrath (rugby union) (born 1960), Irish rugby union player
