= Lemeki =

Lemeki is a given name and surname. Notable people with the name include:

- Lemeki Vaipulu (born c. 1961), Tongan rugby union player
- Lomano Lemeki (born 1989), New Zealand rugby union player
