= Makisi =

Makisi is a surname. Notable people with the surname include:

- Faulua Makisi (born 1997), Japanese rugby union player
- Saia Makisi (born 1981), Tongan rugby league player
- Takai Makisi (born c. 1962), Tongan rugby union player
