= Brian Anderson (rugby union) =

Scottish rugby union referee

Brian Anderson is a retired Scottish rugby Union referee who took charge of nineteen major international matches. The international matches that he officiated over took place between 1985 and 1991 and included matches at the first two Rugby World Cups. When he retired in 1991, he had refereed the most internationals by any Scot.

== Refereeing career ==
His first international match in charge was a Five Nations Championship match between Wales and England on 17 January 1981 at Cardiff Arms Park.

In the 1987 Rugby World Cup he refereed the pool match between Australia and the United States at Ballymore Stadium in Brisbane on 31 May 1987, then the quarter final match between Australia and Ireland, played at the Concord Oval in Sydney.

He was referee in semi-final between Australia and France on 13 June 1987.

Anderson was a touch judge in the 1987 Rugby World Cup Final played between New Zealand and France on 20 June.

In the 1991 Rugby World Cup he was referee of the pool A match between England and Italy on 8 October 1991 and the pool C match between Argentina vs West Samoa at Sardis Road, Pontypridd on 13 October 1991. In the quarter final match between Ireland vs Australia on 20 October he was a touch judge.

Anderson's last international refereeing appearance on 13 October 1991 was at the World Cup match between Argentina and Western Samoa in Pontypridd where he had to retire from his duties having sustained a hamstring injury during that match and was replaced by his fellow Scottish Referee, Jim Fleming.

In December 1991, he retired from refereeing, citing his reasons as "personal and business". The International Rugby Football Board's new rule came into force and limited the panel of referees to three per country. The SRU secretary Bill Hogg paid tribute to Anderson on his retirement, saying that

Without doubt he's been a tremendous referee over many years. He set a new standard for refereeing in Scotland.
