= Peter Fatialofa =

Samoa international rugby union player & coach

Peter Fatialofa MNZM
- Born: Peter Momoe Fatialofa; 26 April 1959 Auckland, New Zealand
- Died: 6 November 2013 (aged 54) Apia, Samoa
- Height: 1.84 m (6 ft 1/2 in)
- Weight: 115 kg (254 lb)
- Notable relative(s): DJ Forbes (nephew); John Senio (son-in-law)
- Occupation(s): Piano and furniture mover

Rugby union career
- Position: Prop
Senior career
| Years | Team | Apps | (Points) |
| 1980 | Grafton | | |
| 1981–96 | Ponsonby RFC | | |
| 198?-19?? | L'Aquila Rugby | | |
| 1994–95 | Manurewa | | |
Provincial / State sides
| Years | Team | Apps | (Points) |
| 1984–1992 | Auckland | 72 | (24) |
| 1994–1996 | Counties Manukau | 18 | (20) |
International career
| Years | Team | Apps | (Points) |
| 1988–96 | Samoa | 34 | (15) |
Coaching career
- Years: Team
- 1999: Samoa (assistant coach)
- 2002: King Country
- 2012–2013: East Tamaki RFC

Papali'itele Peter Momoe Fatialofa MNZM (Samoan: Pita Fatialofa) (26 April 1959 – 6 November 2013) was a Samoan rugby player who captained Samoa in their first Rugby World Cup appearance in 1991. He was among the first of the New Zealand–based players to represent Samoa. He was nicknamed Fats.

== Early life ==
Fatialofa's father is from Lepa Aleipata, Samoa and his mother from Samoa too, but all his life was raised from his mother's side. Fatialofa was born in Auckland, but returned to Samoa when he was still at primary school.

== Career ==
Fatialofa began his senior rugby career in Auckland playing for the Grafton Club as a 19-year-old in the Auckland Senior B competition. He transferred to the Ponsonby club in 1981, winning the Gallaher Shield eight times with that team between 1981 and 1995. He played 72 representative games for Auckland and was part of their Ranfurly Shield reign from 1985 to 1993. In the late 1980s and in the early 90s, he also played for Modena Rugby and L'Aquila Rugby in Italy.

Fatialofa debuted for Samoa against Ireland in a test match on 29 October in their 1988 tour of Wales and Ireland. He first captained Samoa in 1989 and led them at the 1991 Rugby World Cup. They lost to Scotland in the quarter-finals 28–6.

Fatialofa last played for Samoa against Fiji in Suva on 20 July 1996. Fats: Peter Fatialofa and the Manu Samoa Story an autobiography was published and released the same year. He subsequently worked as a director for his family-owned piano and furniture moving business.

Fatialofa died of a heart attack in Apia on 6 November 2013.

== Honours and awards ==
In the 1996 Queen's Birthday Honours, Fatialofa was appointed a Member of the New Zealand Order of Merit, for services to rugby.

In 2019, Fatialofa was inducted into the World Rugby Hall of Fame, alongside Richie McCaw, Shiggy Konno, Os du Randt, Sir Graham Henry, and Diego Ormaechea. In 2024, he was an inaugural inductee into the Pasifika Rugby Hall of Fame.
