= East Tamaki RFC =

East Tamaki Rugby Football Club
- Union: Auckland Rugby Football Union
- Founded: 1962
- Location: Ōtara, Auckland
- Ground(s): East Tamaki Domain
- President: Richard
- League(s): Auckland Premier

Official website
- www.sportsground.co.nz/clubsite.asp?siteid=11485&pageid=38418&pagetypeid=19

East Tamaki Rugby Football Club is a rugby union club based in Auckland, New Zealand. The club was established in 1962 and is affiliated with the Auckland Rugby Football Union.

== History ==
East Tamaki was initially founded as a "branch" of Otahuhu RFC. However, with the influx of Polynesian immigrants to the Ōtara and East Tāmaki area in the 1960s, East Tamaki broke away from Otahuhu, becoming an independent club in 1962. Today, the club has junior and senior teams, with age grades ranging from under-6 to over-60. To date, the club has never won the Gallaher Shield, the premier senior men's trophy in Auckland rugby.

== International players ==
The club has produced a number of players who have gone on to play international rugby:

=== New Zealand ===
- Eric Rush
- Pita Alatini

=== Manu Samoa ===
- Peter Fatialofa
- Francis Leilua
- Junior Paramore
- Ngapaku Ngapaku
- Mark Luafalealo
- Koki Avei
- Tupo Fa'amasino

=== Tonga ===
- Talai Fifita
- Sam Alatini
- Tony Alatini
