= Bruce Breen =

Canada international rugby union player

- Born: 13 October 1961 (age 65) Mississauga, Ontario, Canada

Rugby union career
International career
Years	Team	Apps	(Points)
1986–1993	Canada	9	(4)

Bruce Breen (born 13 October 1961) is a Canadian former rugby union player. He played in nine matches for the Canada national rugby union team from 1986 to 1993, including one match at the 1987 Rugby World Cup and one at the 1991 Rugby World Cup.
