= Ron van den Brink =

Canada international rugby union player

Rob van den Brink
- Born: 6 January 1962 (age 64) Maple Ridge, British Columbia
- Height: 198 cm (6 ft 6 in)
- Weight: 109 kg (240 lb)

Rugby union career
- Position: Lock
International career
Years	Team	Apps	(Points)
1986–1991	Canada	8	(4)

Ron van den Brink, also reported as Ron Vandenbrink (born 30 September 1962) is a Canadian former rugby union player. He played in eight matches for the Canada national rugby union team from 1986 to 1991, including one match at the 1987 Rugby World Cup and three matches at the 1991 Rugby World Cup.
