= Tom Woods (rugby union) =

Canada international rugby union player

- Born: Thomas Anthony Woods; 29 October 1962 (age 64) Victoria BC
- Height: 6’2”
- Weight: 225 lb (102 kg)

Rugby union career
International career
Years	Team	Apps	(Points)
1984–1997	Canada	19	(5)

Tom Woods (born 29 October 1962) is a Canadian rugby union player. He played in 19 matches for the Canada national rugby union team from 1984 to 1997, playing at the 1987 Rugby World Cup and the 1991 Rugby World Cup.
