= Maliu Filise =

Tongan former rugby union player

- Born: Maliu Filise; 29 November 1958 (age 67)

Rugby union career
- Position: Number 8
International career
Years	Team	Apps	(Points)
1987	Tonga	4	(0)

Maliu Filise (born 1 July 1958) is a Tongan former rugby union player. He played as number eight.

== Career ==
Filise's first cap for Tonga was against Fiji in Nuku'alofa, on 28 June 1987. In the same year, he was part of the Tonga squad for the 1987 Rugby World Cup, where he played two matches, with his last test being against Ireland, in Brisbane, on 3 June 1987.
