= Dave Tucker (rugby union) =

Canada international rugby union player

David M. Tucker
- Born: 30 March 1962 (age 64) Alberta, Canada

Rugby union career
- Position: Scrum-half
Senior career
Years	Team	Apps	(Points)
–	Meraloma Rugby		
International career
Years	Team	Apps	(Points)
1985–1987	Canada	6	(4)

David M. Tucker (born 30 March 1962) is a Canadian rugby union player. He played as a scrum-half.

== Career ==
Tucker was first capped for Canada on 15 June 1985, against Australia, on 15 June 1985, in Sydney. He was part of the 1987 Rugby World Cup squad, where he only played the match against Wales in Invercargill, where he replaced Ian Stuart at the 52 minute. This match was also his last international cap for Canada. He also played for Canada Sevens in 1982, 1986, and 1987.
