= Mark Cardinal =

Canada international rugby union player

- Born: May 5, 1961 (age 65) Victoria, British Columbia, Canada
- Height: 5 ft 11 in (1.80 m)
- Weight: 205 lb (93 kg)

Rugby union career
- Position: Hooker
International career
Years	Team	Apps	(Points)
1986-1999	Canada	35	(15)

Mark E. Cardinal (born May 5, 1961 in Victoria, British Columbia) is a former Canadian national rugby player. He played as a hooker.

Cardinal played 35 times for Canada, from 1986 to 1999, scoring 3 tries, 13 points in aggregate. He played three times at the Rugby World Cup, in 1987, 1995 and 1999.

Mark Cardinal is among the nine Canadian rugby icons inducted into the Rugby Canada Hall of Fame in 2023.
