= Viliami Lutua =

Tongan rugby union player

- Born: circa 1956 Haveluliku, Tongatapu
- Occupation: Tonga Rugby Union board member

Rugby union career
- Position: Prop
International career
Years	Team	Apps	(Points)
1981-1988	Tonga	7	(0)

Viliami Lutua (born circa 1956) is a Tongan former rugby union prop.

== Career ==
Lutua debuted for Tonga on 8 August 1981, against Fiji, in Nuku'alofa. He was also part of the 1987 Rugby World Cup 'Ikale Tahi squad, playing the pool stage matches against Wales and Ireland in the tournament. His final cap for Tonga was on 8 October 1988, against Fiji, in Nadi. Currently, Lutui is a Tonga Rugby Union board member.
