= Bill Handson =

Canada international rugby union player

- Born: 3 December 1954 (age 71) Hamilton, Ontario, Canada

Rugby union career
International career
Years	Team	Apps	(Points)
1985–1987	Canada	9	(0)

Bill Handson (born 3 December 1954) is a Canadian rugby union player. He played in nine matches for the Canada national rugby union team from 1985 to 1987, including three matches at the 1987 Rugby World Cup.
