= Ian Hyde-Lay =

Canada international rugby union player, coach, referee

- Born: Ian A. Hyde-Lay; January 31, 1958 (age 68) Duncan, British Columbia
- School: Shawnigan Lake School
- Notable relative: Derek Hyde-Lay (father)
- Occupation: Physical education teacher

Rugby union career
- Position: Fly-half
Senior career
Years	Team	Apps	(Points)
198?-19??	Victoria Vikes		
International career
Years	Team	Apps	(Points)
1986-1988	Canada	3	(7)

Ian A. Hyde-Lay (born 31 January 1958, in Duncan, British Columbia) is a Canadian former rugby union footballer, coach and referee. He played as fly-half. Before his rugby union career, he was also a basketball player, with his position being guard, and coach as well.

== Career ==
=== Basketball career ===
In 1979, Hyde-Lay was captain and guard of the Victoria Vikes squad which won the national title during the 1979–80 season. He also coached the basketball team of the St. Michaels University School, where Steve Nash and Milan Uzelac played. As of 2017, he is the Victoria Vikes' assistant coach.

=== Rugby union career ===
Hyde-Lay debuted for Canada against Japan on 7 June 1986, at Burnaby Lake. He was also member of the Canadian squad at 1987 Rugby World Cup, but did not play any match during the tournament. His last cap was against United States on 11 June 1988, at Saranac Lake. After his playing and refereeing careers, he coached Castaway Wanderers.
