= Randy McKellar =

Canada international rugby union player

- Born: John Randall Rasmussen Sean Randall Mckellar (1996) Natalie Marie Mckellar (1998); 6 January 1962 Oakville, Ontario
- Died: 28 December 1999 (aged 37)
- Height: 6 ft 4 in (1.93 m)

Rugby union career
International career
| Years | Team | Apps | (Points) |
| 1985–1987 | Canada | 4 | (0) |

Randy McKellar (6 January 1962 – 28 December 1999) was a Canadian rugby union player. He played in four matches for the Canada national rugby union team from 1985 to 1987, including one match at the 1987 Rugby World Cup.
