= Hakatoa Tupou =

Tongan rugby union player

- Born: Hakatoa Tupou; 10 June 1958
- Died: 28 July 2018 (aged 60)

Rugby union career
- Position: Prop
International career
Years	Team	Apps	(Points)
1982-1987	Tonga	9	(4)

Hakatoa Tupou (born circa 1958) is a Tongan former rugby union player. He played as prop.

== Career ==
Tupou first played for the 'Ikale Tahi against Samoa on 25 August 1982, in Nuku'alofa. He was also called up for the Tonga squad for the 1987 Rugby World Cup, where he played against Wales and against Ireland, the latter being his last international cap. He earned 4 points, 1 try and 0 conversions in aggregate.

== Personal life ==
In 1979 he married Senilaite Tautuiaki of Āhau, Tongatapu, Tonga Is. They had six children of three boys and girls. He provided for his family through his rugby career and work where he played for the Ikale Tahi team at 1987 World Cup against Wales. He was a heavy machine manager at the Yakka Demolition where he last worked before he died. He was also a member of the Upper Room Church.
