= Paul Collins (rugby union, born 1959) =

Irish rugby union player

Paul Collins (born 7 December 1959 in Cork) is a former Irish rugby union international player who played for the Irish national rugby union team. He played as a flanker for the Ireland team from 1987 to 1990, winning 2 caps and was part of the Ireland squad at the 1987 Rugby World Cup where he played in one match.
