= Roy Radu =

Canada international rugby union player

- Born: September 11, 1963 (age 63) Burnaby, British Columbia, Canada
- Height: 6 ft 0 in (1.83 m)
- Weight: 195 lb (88 kg)

Rugby union career
- Position: Flanker
Senior career
Years	Team	Apps	(Points)
–1991	James Bay AA		
International career
Years	Team	Apps	(Points)
1985-1991	Canada	12	(0)

Roy E. Radu (born September 11, 1963 in Burnaby, British Columbia) is a former Canadian national rugby player of Romanian descent. He played as a flanker, and played for the Canadian national team in the 1987 and 1991 Rugby World Cups.

In 1988 he was the recipient of the Bobby Gaul Memorial Trophy an award presented by the University of British Columbia to the graduating male athlete who best combines the qualities of leadership and sportsmanship.

In 2018, Radu was inducted into the BC Sports Hall of Fame as a member of the 1991 Rugby World Cup Canadian team.
