= Kasi Fine =

Tongan former rugby union player

- Born: Kasi Fine; March 20, 1964 (age 62) Tonga

Rugby union career
- Position: Lock
International career
Years	Team	Apps	(Points)
1987-1988	Tonga	4	(0)

Kasi Fine (born 20 March 1964) is a Tongan former rugby union player who played as lock.

== Career ==
Fine debuted for Tonga in the 1987 Rugby World Cup, playing all of the three pool stage matches against Canada, Wales and Ireland. His final cap for Tonga was against Fiji, in Nadi, on 8 October 1988. He played throughout in all of his career 4 matches, never scoring.
