= Samiu Mohi =

Tongan rugby union player

- Born: Samiu Mohi circa 1962

Rugby union career
- Position: Centre
International career
| Years | Team | Apps | (Points) |
| 1986-1987 | Tonga | 6 | (0) |

Samiu Mohi (born c. 1962) is a Tongan former rugby union player. He played as centre.

== Career ==
Mohi's first test cap for Tonga was on 12 June 1986, against Wales, in Nuku'alofa. He was also part of the 1987 Rugby World Cup Tonga squad, where he played all the three pool matches, with his last test cap being against Ireland, on 3 June 1987, in Ballymore.
