= Epeli Rakai =

- Born: circa 1961 (age 64–65) Fiji
- Height: 5 ft 10 in (1.78 m)
- Weight: 210 lb (95 kg)

Rugby union career
- Position: Hooker
Senior career
Years	Team	Apps	(Points)
1982-1987	Suva		
International career
Years	Team	Apps	(Points)
1983-1987	Fiji	17	(0)

Epeli Rakai (born circa 1961) is a Fijian former rugby union footballer. He played as hooker.

== Career ==
His first international cap for Fiji was during the match against Solomon Islands, in Apia, on 8 September 1983. He also took part at the 1987 Rugby World Cup, playing two matches with the quarter-final lost to France being his last international cap. Rakai was also part of the South Pacific Barbarians, a team made up of Fijian, Tongan and Samoan players who played a rebel tour in South Africa, among which were present his teammates who played in Suva, such as Severo Koroduadua, Paulo Nawalu and Sairusi Naituku.
