= Taipaleti Tuʻuta =

Tongan rugby union player

- Born: Taipaleti Kakato Tuʻuta circa 1964
- Occupation: Farmer

Rugby union career
- Position: Flanker
Provincial / State sides
Years	Team	Apps	(Points)
1987-92	Tongatapu		
International career
Years	Team	Apps	(Points)
1987-1992	Tonga	8	(0)

Taipaleti Kakato Tuʻuta (born circa 1964) is a Tongan former rugby union player. He played as flanker.

== Career ==
Tuʻuta first played for the 'Ikale Tahi during the 1987 Rugby World Cup, in the first match against Canada, in Napier, on 24 May 1987. He also played the other two matches in the tournament. His last cap for Tonga was on 25 July 1992, against Fiji, in Nuku'alofa, earning 8 caps and 0 points.
