= Sione Tahaafe =

Tongan rugby union player

- Born: 8 July 1958 (age 68) Tonga
- Height: 6 ft 4 in (193 cm)
- Weight: 242 lb (110 kg)

Rugby union career
- Position: Number 8
Senior career
Years	Team	Apps	(Points)
197?-1986	Eastwood Rugby Club		
1986-1991	Stade Montchaninois		
1995-2000	Stade Dijonnais Côte D'Or		
International career
Years	Team	Apps	(Points)
1987	Tonga	1	(0)

Sione Tahaafe (born 8 July 1958), is a Tongan former rugby union player who played as number 8.

== Career ==
Tahaafe started his career in 1974, after he left Tonga to go to New Zealand, and then to Australia where he played in the Shute Shield with Eastwood Rugby Club, winning the Ken Catchpole Award in 1986. Later, he moved to France to play for Stade Montchaninois until 1995, to play later for Stade Dijonnais Côte D'Or until 2000. In 2001, Tahaafe retired to coach an under-19 team in Sens.

== International career ==
Tahaafe debuted for Tonga in the 1987 Rugby World Cup in Australia and New Zealand, where he only played against Canada national rugby union team, on 24 May 1987, in Napier, with this match being his only international cap.
