= Liueli Fusimalohi =

Tongan rugby union player and coach

- Born: Liueli Fusimalohi c. 1966
- Occupation: Water Board officer

Rugby union career
- Position: Fullback
Provincial / State sides
Years	Team	Apps	(Points)
1987–1991	ʻEua		
International career
Years	Team	Apps	(Points)
1987–1991	Tonga	5	(0)
Coaching career
- Years: Team
- 2015–present: Tonga U-20

Liueli Fusimalohi (born c. 1966) is a Tongan former rugby union player and coach. He played as fullback.

== Career ==
Despite being member of the 1987 Rugby World Cup squad, Fusimalohi did not play any match of in the tournament, due to Tali Eteʻaki being the first-choice fullback for Tonga in the tournament. He began his international career with Tonga on 29 August 1987, against Fiji in Suva. His last international cap was against Fiji, in Suva, on 11 June 1991. He earned 5 matches, 0 points and 0 conversions in aggregate.

== Coaching career ==
Between 2000 and 2001, he served as assistant coach for Tonga under the tenure of the then-head coach Valita Ueleni. Since 2015, Fusimalohi coaches the Tonga national under-20 rugby union team.
