= Ro Hindson =

Canada international rugby union player

- Born: 23 May 1951 (age 75)

Rugby union career
International career
Years	Team	Apps	(Points)
1973–1990	Canada	31	(9)

Ro Hindson (born 23 May 1951) is a Canadian rugby union player. He played in 31 matches for the Canada national rugby union team from 1973 to 1990, including two matches at the 1987 Rugby World Cup.
