= Glenn Ennis =

Canada international rugby union player (born 1964)

- Born: May 19, 1964 (age 62) Vancouver, British Columbia, Canada

Rugby union career
- Position: No. 8
Senior career
Years	Team	Apps	(Points)
19-1991	James Bay AA		
1991-1999	Suntory		
International career
Years	Team	Apps	(Points)
1986-1998	Canada	32	(28)

Glenn D. Ennis (born May 19, 1964 in Vancouver, British Columbia, Canada) is a former Canadian national rugby player.

Ennis played a total of 32 games for Canada, including 3 as captain. He played in the mid to late 1990s in Japan for Suntory.

In his second career, Ennis works as an actor and stuntman in the motion picture and television industry. His notable credits include providing the stunts for Jason Voorhees in the 2003 slasher film Freddy vs. Jason, playing the role of a vicious grizzly bear in the 2015 Western film The Revenant, and a bloater in the second season of The Last of Us.
