= Steve Gray (rugby union) =

Canada international rugby union player (born 1963)

Stephen D. Gray (born July 19, 1963 in Ottawa, Ontario) is a Canadian former rugby union player. He played Wing and centre, and played in a total of 47 matches for Canada. He played in the 1987, 1991 and 1995 Rugby World Cups, as well as several rugby sevens tours. He Captained both the Sevens and Fifteens sides several times. He played for the Ottawa Beavers, Ottawa Irish, Vancouver Kats and Burnaby Lake Rugby Club. He also played a season in the UK with Blackheath FC.
