= Lemeki Vaipulu =

Tongan rugby union player

- Born: 1961 (age 64–65) Tonga
- Notable relative: Maama Vaipulu (son)

Rugby union career
- Position: Fly-half
International career
Years	Team	Apps	(Points)
1987	Tonga	1	(0)

Lemeki Vaipulu (born circa 1961) is a Tongan former rugby union player who played as fly-half. He played for Tonga in the 1987 Rugby World Cup, playing only the match against Canada, in Napier, on 24 May 1987. In said match, he entered in the place of Soane Asi at minute 22, playing as winger. He is the father of the rugby union flanker Maama Vaipulu.
