= Tali Eteʻaki =

Tongan rugby union player

- Born: 1963 (age 62–63)
- Notable relative: Paul Eteaki (nephew)
- Occupation: Clerk

Rugby union career
- Position: Fullback
Provincial / State sides
Years	Team	Apps	(Points)
1984-1991	Tongatapu		
International career
Years	Team	Apps	(Points)
1984-1991	Tonga	13	(0)

Tali Eteʻaki (born circa 1963) is a Tongan former rugby union footballer who played as a fullback.

== Career ==
His first international cap for Tonga was during a match against Fiji, in Suva, on 21 July 1984. He was also part of the 1987 Rugby World Cup squad, playing all the three pool stage matches against Ireland, Canada and Wales. In the latter match, where the Welsh winger Glen Webbe got hit in the chin by a flying tackle done by Eteʻaki. Eteʻaki made his final appearance for Tonga in the match against Samoa in Nukuʻalofa on 28 May 1991.
