= Des Fitzgerald =

Irish rugby player (born 1957)

- Born: 20 December 1957 (age 68)
- Height: 1.86 m (6 ft 1 in)
- Weight: 111 kg (17 st 7 lb; 245 lb)
- School: De la Salle College, Churchtown.

Rugby union career
- Position: Prop
International career
Years	Team	Apps	(Points)
1984-1992	Ireland		

Desmond Fitzgerald (born 20 December 1957 in Dublin) is a former Irish rugby union international player who played for the Irish national rugby union team. He played as a prop forward. He played for the Ireland team from 1984 to 1992, winning 34 caps, after making his debut in February 1984 against England in a 12–9 defeat at Twickenham. He played in two Rugby World Cups: 1987 and 1991. He is the father of Irish International rugby player Luke Fitzgerald.

Des was also an excellent GAA football player and he won a schools final while playing for De La Salle Rathfarnham National School in Croke Park in 1968.

His son Luke is also a former Irish rugby union player who played as a winger or fullback for Leinster Rugby and Ireland national rugby union team.
