= Latu Vaʻeno =

Tongan rugby union player

- Born: Latu Vaʻeno circa 1959

Rugby union career
- Position: Prop
International career
Years	Team	Apps	(Points)
1985-1987	Tonga	4	(0)

Latu Vaʻeno (born circa 1959) is a former Tongan rugby union player. He played as a prop.

== Career ==
His first cap for Tonga was during a match against Fiji, at Apia, on 5 June 1985. He also was part of the 1987 Rugby World Cup, where he only played the pool match against Wales, at Palmerston North, on 29 May 1987, which was also his last match for Tonga.
