= Tony Gray (rugby union) =

Wales international rugby union footballer

- Born: Anthony John Gray; 14 June 1942 (age 84) Stoke-on-Trent, Staffordshire, England

Rugby union career
- Position: Flanker
Amateur team(s)
Years	Team	Apps	(Points)
- Newbridge
–	London Welsh.		
International career
Years	Team	Apps	(Points)
1968	Wales	2	(0)
Coaching career
- Years: Team
- 1985–1988: Wales

Anthony John Gray (born 14 June 1942 in Stoke-on-Trent), is a former Wales international rugby union player and former head coach of the Wales national rugby union team. A flanker, he played his club rugby for Newbridge and London Welsh. As a coach he took the Welsh team to third place in the inaugural Rugby World Cup, a feat not yet equalled.
