= Mark Brooke-Cowden =

NZ international rugby union & league footballer

Personal information
- Full name: Mark Brooke-Cowden
- Born: 12 June 1963 (age 62) New Zealand
- Height: 183 cm (6 ft 0 in)
- Weight: 91 kg (14 st 5 lb; 201 lb)

Playing information

Rugby union
- Position: Flanker
Club
| Years | Team | Pld | T | G | FG | P |
|---|---|---|---|---|---|---|
| 1984–87 | Auckland |
Representative
| Years | Team | Pld | T | G | FG | P |
| 1986–87 | New Zealand | 3 | 2 | 0 | 0 | 8 |

Rugby league
- Position: Lock, Second-row, Prop
Club
| Years | Team | Pld | T | G | FG | P |
|---|---|---|---|---|---|---|
| 1987–89 | Leeds | 45 | 5 | 0 | 0 | 20 |
| 1989–90 | Salford | 20 | 2 | 0 | 0 | 8 |
| 1991–92 | Halifax | | 0 | 0 | 0 | 0 |
| 1992–94 | Keighley | 60 | 10 | 0 | 0 | 40 |
| | Total | 125 | 17 | 0 | 0 | 68 |

Mark Brooke-Cowden (born 12 June 1963) is a New Zealand former rugby union and rugby league footballer. In rugby union he played as a flanker. In rugby union, he won 3 caps for the All Blacks between 1986 and 1987 and was a member of the victorious New Zealand squad at the 1987 Rugby World Cup. He then switched to rugby league, and played professionally in England.

== Playing career ==
=== County Cup Final appearances ===
Mark Brooke-Cowden played right-second-row (replaced by substitute Paul Medley) in Leeds' 33–12 victory over Castleford in the 1988 Yorkshire Cup Final during the 1988–89 season at Elland Road, Leeds on Sunday 16 October 1988.
