= Brian Spillane =

Irish rugby union player (born 1960)

Brian Spillane (born 26 January 1960) in Cork is a former Irish rugby union international player who played for the Irish national rugby union team. He played as a number eight. He played for the Ireland team from 1985 to 1989, winning 16 caps and was a member of the Ireland squad at 1987 Rugby World Cup. He made his debut in February 1985 against Scotland and scored a try for Ireland against Canada in the 1987 Rugby World Cup.

Spillane won a Triple Crown and 5 Nations Championship in 1985. He also played inter county football for Limerick and won county championships with Monaleen at all grades.

== Personal life ==
He currently works as a medical doctor. He is married to Brid and they have 5 adult children.
