= Talanoa Kitekeiʻaho =

Tongan rugby union footballer

- Born: Talanoa Fuka Kitekei'aho; 1958 (age 67–68) Vaheloto, Tongatapu, Tonga

Rugby union career
- Position: Centre
International career
Years	Team	Apps	(Points)
1979-1987	Tonga	4	(0)

Talanoa Fuka Kitekei'aho (born Vaheloto, Tongatapu, 1958) is a former Tongan rugby union footballer who played as centre. He was also the Tonga Rugby Union interim CEO.

== Career ==
He was first capped for Tonga in the match against Fiji, in Suva, on 8 September 1979. Kitekei'aho was also capped in the 1987 Rugby World Cup, playing all the three pool stage matches against Canada, Wales and Ireland, the latter being his last cap for Tonga.

== As Tonga Rugby Union CEO ==
In June 2013, Kitekei'aho was appointed as interim CEO for Tonga Rugby Union, which was occupied then by 'Emeline Tuita, whose term lasted less than six months. However, ‘Āminiasi Kefu stated that Kitekei'aho failed an interview to prove his possession of expertise and skills. In May 2016, Kitekeiaho protested about Fe'ao Vunipola's election as Tonga Rugby Union interim chairman and President, claiming it as 'unconstitutional'.
