= Takai Makisi =

Tongan rugby union player

- Born: Takai Makisi circa 1963
- Height: 178 cm (5 ft 10 in)
- Weight: 90 kg (198 lb)

Rugby union career
- Position: Prop
International career
Years	Team	Apps	(Points)
1983-1989	Tonga	4	(0)

Takai Makisi (born circa 1962) is a Tongan former rugby union player. He played as prop.

== Career ==
Makisi debuted for Tonga against New Zealand Maori in Rotorua, on 6 August 1983. He was part of the 1987 Rugby World Cup Tongan squad, but did not play any match in the tournament. His last cap was against Fiji, in Nuku'alofa, on 22 July 1989.
