= Steve Sutton (rugby union) =

Wales international rugby union player (born 1958)

- Born: Stephen Sutton; 17 February 1958 (age 68) Abertillery, Wales

Rugby union career
- Position: Lock
Senior career
Years	Team	Apps	(Points)
197?–1979	Pontypool		
1979–1982	Ebbw Vale		
1979–1987	South Wales Police		
International career
Years	Team	Apps	(Points)
1983–1987	Wales	9	(0)

Steve Sutton (born 17 February 1958 in Abertillery) is a former Welsh rugby union player who played as a lock.

== Career ==
He started his club career playing for Pontypool RFC, where he played until the 1979–80 Season, where he played for Ebbw Vale RFC, years later, he would play for South Wales Police RFC. Sutton had his first cap for Wales in the 1982 Five Nations Championship match against France in Cardiff, on 6 February 1983. He was part of the 1987 Rugby World Cup Welsh squad, playing three matches in the tournament, with the third place final against Australia, in Rotorua, on 18 June 1987 being his last international cap for Wales. played and captained Merthyr RFC in1995-96
