= Terry Kingston =

Irish rugby union player

Terry Kingston (born 19 September 1963 in Cork) is a former Irish rugby union international player who played for the Irish national rugby union team. He played as a hooker.

== Career ==
Gaining his first full cap for the Ireland national team which played Wales in the 1987 Rugby World Cup, he went on to win 30 caps for Ireland. In total he played in three Rugby World Cups, at 1987, 1991 and 1995 where he was captain of the Irish team. He is also a former Munster Rugby player, and was captain of the Munster team that beat Australia (the then Rugby World Cup holders) in 1992. He retired from representative rugby in 1996.
