= Huw Richards =

Wales international rugby union player

- Born: Huw David Richards; 9 October 1960 (age 66) Carmarthen

Rugby union career
- Position: Lock
Amateur team(s)
| Years | Team | Apps | (Points) |
- Abercrave RFC
| – | Neath RFC | | |
International career
| Years | Team | Apps | (Points) |
| 1986–1987 | Wales | 4 | (0) |

Huw David Richards (born 9 October 1960) is a former Welsh and Neath RFC rugby union player. He played in the 1987 Rugby World Cup as a lock and became the first player to receive a red card in a Rugby World Cup tournament.

== Biography ==
Richards was born on 9 October 1960 in Carmarthen and attended school in Ystradgynlais. He is best known for his achievements as a rugby union player.

=== Career ===
Richards played for Abercrave RFC before moving on to Neath RFC. Neath were a rising force in Welsh rugby in the 1980s, finishing as runners up in the 1984 Welsh Cup final against Cardiff. From this Richards earned an international call-up, making his debut for the Welsh 'B' team in November of that year. He joined the 1986 tour of the South Pacific and was brought into a game against Tonga when, after a lengthy brawl, injured flanker Mark Brown had to be substituted. This was the first of four caps that he would earn.

Though not given a position as a first team player, Richards was part of the Welsh team at the inaugural Rugby World Cup in 1987. He was given his first start against Tonga in a pool match after several frontline players were rested but returned to the bench after that game. In the quarter-final against England Richards came on when Bob Norster was injured and he remained as part of the line-up for the semi-final against New Zealand. The Welsh side were no match for the dominant All Blacks and the game was all but over when Richards became the first player to receive a red card in the tournament. Emerging from a loose scrum, Gary Whetton elbowed Richards face. Richards punched Whetton and was in turn hit by New Zealand number eight Buck Shelford. Richards fell to the floor. After being revived he was sent off by referee Kerry Fitzgerald while Shelford escaped punishment. Richards also received a one-week suspension for his actions and missed the final match of the team's World Cup – the third place playoff against Australia. After the tournament he could no longer get into the international team but for several years continued to play for Neath.

== See also ==
- List of Rugby World Cup red cards
