= Taliaʻuli Liavaʻa =

Tongan rugby union player

Talia'uli Liava'a
- Born: circa 1970
- School: Tupou College

Rugby union career
- Position: Fly-half
Senior career
| Years | Team | Apps | (Points) |
| 198?-198? | Toloa Old Boys | | |
International career
| Years | Team | Apps | (Points) |
| 1987 | Tonga | 0 | (0) |

Taliaʻuli Liavaʻa (born c. 1970) is a Tongan former rugby union player who played as fly-half.

== Career ==
He played for Toloa Old Boys at club level. He also was in the Tonga 1987 Rugby World Cup squad, where he was the youngest member at the age of 17. However, Liava'a did not play any match in the tournament.
