= Ray Giles =

Wales international rugby union footballer

- Born: Raymond Giles; 15 January 1961 (age 65) Kenfig Hill, Wales
- Height: 5.6
- School: Cynffig Comprehensive School
- Occupation: Steel worker

Rugby union career
- Position: Scrum-half
Amateur team(s)
Years	Team	Apps	(Points)
- Kenfig Hill RFC
1980-1987	Aberavon RFC	352	(396)
1987-1989	Cardiff RFC	58	(36)
1989-1991	Aberavon RFC	5	(0)
International career
Years	Team	Apps	(Points)
1983-1987	Wales	3	(0)

Raymond Giles (born 15 January 1961) is a former Welsh and Aberavon RFC and Cardiff RFC rugby union player.

== Career ==
He started his club career playing Kenfig Hill RFC until 1983, when he moved to Aberavon RFC, for whom he scored 11 points. Between 1987 and 1989 he played for Cardiff RFC, with 58 appearances and scoring 36 points, before returning to Aberavon in 1989 until ending his career in the 1991–92 season. Giles' first cap for Wales was during a match against Romania, in Bucharest, on 12 November 1983. He was also part of the 1987 Rugby World Cup Welsh squad, where he played only the match against Canada in Invercargill, which was his last match for Wales.

Currently, Giles is a patron for Prostate Cymru, a Welsh organisation to raise prostate cancer awareness.
