= John Lecky (rugby union, born 1960) =

Canada international rugby union player

- Born: 15 February 1960 (age 66)

Rugby union career
International career
Years	Team	Apps	(Points)
1982–1991	Canada	18	(15)

John Lecky (born 15 February 1960) is a Canadian rugby union player. He played in 18 matches for the Canada national rugby union team from 1982 to 1991, including two matches at the 1987 Rugby World Cup and two matches at the 1991 Rugby World Cup.
