= Ian Stuart (rugby union) =

Canada international rugby union player

- Born: 8 October 1961 (age 65) Hamilton, Ontario, Canada

Rugby union career
International career
Years	Team	Apps	(Points)
1984–1994	Canada	21	(13)

Ian Stuart (born 8 October 1961) is a Canadian rugby union player. He played in 21 matches for the Canada national rugby union team from 1984 to 1994, including three matches at the 1987 Rugby World Cup.
