= Steve Blackmore =

British rugby union player (1962–2020)

- Born: Steven Walter Blackmore; 3 March 1962 Cardiff, Wales
- Died: 7 May 2020 (aged 58)

Rugby union career
- Position: Prop
Amateur team(s)
Years	Team	Apps	(Points)
- Cardiff RFC
International career
Years	Team	Apps	(Points)
1987	Wales	4	(0)

Steven Walter Blackmore (3 March 1962 – 7 May 2020) was a Welsh rugby union player. He began his international career playing for Wales in the Five Nations championship in 1987 when they lost to Ireland. He also played for Wales in the first Rugby World Cup later that year. In that competition he played in the winning side versus Tonga and Canada in the early stages, and Australia in the third-place play-off.

Blackmore played his domestic rugby at Cardiff RFC. After retiring from the game, he worked as a parcel courier. He and his wife had two daughters, Kendall and Kerys, and his son Sydney has played for the Welsh Under-20s side.

In December 2018, Blackmore was told he had months to live, after being diagnosed with an aggressive brain tumour. He died of a brain tumour in May 2020, aged 58.
