= Amone Afu =

Tongan rugby union player

- Born: Amone Afu Fungavaka circa 1957 Holonga, Tongatapu, Tonga

Rugby union career
- Position: Hooker
International career
Years	Team	Apps	(Points)
1982-1987	Tonga	13	(4)

Amone Afu Fungavaka (born in Holonga, circa 1957) is a former Tongan rugby union player. He played as a hooker.

== Career ==
His first cap for Tonga was during a match against Samoa, at Apia, on 25 August 1982. He also was part of the 1987 Rugby World Cup, where he played all the three pool stage matches in the tournament. His last international cap for Tonga was against Fiji, at Suva, on 29 August 1987.
