= Keith Crossan =

Irish rugby union player (born 1959)

Keith Crossan (born 29 December 1959 in Belfast, Northern Ireland) is a former Irish rugby union international player who played as a winger for the Irish national rugby union team from 1982 to 1992. Known for his searing pace on the left wing, Crossan won 41 caps, scored 12 tries and was part of the Triple Crown-winning teams of 1982 and 1985. In the 1985 championship, Crossan scored a superb try in Cardiff and a vital try at home to England as Ireland won the championship. He also scored two tries against Canada at the 1987 Rugby World Cup. He played in two Rugby World Cups: 1987 and 1991. Crossan also played for the Barbarians against Argentina in 1990, scoring two tries.
