= Job Langbroek =

Irish rugby union player

Job Langbroek (born 1 July 1957) is a former Irish rugby union player who represented the Irish national team at schoolboy and senior level, and also played for Blackrock College. A loosehead prop forward, he won his only international cap in Ireland's 32–9 over Tonga at the 1987 Rugby World Cup. He was a stockbroker's analyst.
