= Anthony Buchanan =

Welsh rugby union player

- Born: Anthony Buchanan; 30 June 1955 (age 71) Ystradgynlais, Wales

Rugby union career
- Position: Prop forward
Amateur team(s)
Years	Team	Apps	(Points)
1981-1991	Llanelli RFC	225	(105)
International career
Years	Team	Apps	(Points)
1987-1988	Wales	5	(0)

Anthony Buchanan (born 30 June 1955 in Ystradgynlais, Wales) is a former rugby union player. A prop forward, Buchanan made his international debut for Wales versus Tonga on 29 May 1987. He played for Wales in the first Rugby World Cup later that year and he featured in the Wales Triple Crown winning team of 1988.

Buchanan played his domestic rugby at Llanelli RFC and he later became Director of Rugby at Llanelli. He played 225 for Llanelli and scored 27 tries.

== See also ==
- Llanelli profile
- Anthony Buchanan at ESPNscrum (archived)
