= Talai Fifita =

Tongan rugby union player

- Born: Talai Fifita; July 24, 1962 (age 64)
- Height: 170 cm (5 ft 7 in)
- Weight: 77 kg (170 lb)
- Occupation: Farmer

Rugby union career
- Position: Scrum-half
Amateur team(s)
Years	Team	Apps	(Points)
19??-19??	East Tamaki RFC		
Provincial / State sides
Years	Team	Apps	(Points)
- Tongatapu
International career
Years	Team	Apps	(Points)
1983–1991	Tonga	11	(16)

Talai Fifita (born 24 July 1962) is a former Tongan rugby union football player who played for the national team and East Tamaki RFC. His regular playing position was scrum-half.

== Career ==
Fifita debuted for Tonga in a match against Fiji, in Suva, on 18 June 1983. He was later called up for the Ikale Tahi squad for the 1987 Rugby World Cup, where he played all the three pool stage matches in the tournament. In the match against Wales, in Palmerston North, Fifita scored a try which was converted by Alamoni Liavaʻa. Fifita last played for the Tonga in a match against Fiji, in Suva, on 8 June 1991, earning 11 caps and in aggregate 16 points and 4 tries scored.
