= Dave Bishop (referee) =

NZ rugby union referee

- Born: David James Bishop; 13 September 1948 (age 78) Christchurch, New Zealand
- School: Geraldine High School

Rugby union career
Refereeing career
| Years | Competition | Apps |
| 1986–95 | Test matches | 26 |

David James Bishop (born 13 September 1948) is a former New Zealand international rugby union referee, who controlled 26 international matches between 1986 and 1995, including at the first three Rugby World Cup tournaments.

Bishop was born in Christchurch on 13 September 1948, the son of James and Myra Bishop, and educated at Geraldine High School. He married Alison Zanders in 1979, and the couple had two children. In 1990, he was awarded the New Zealand 1990 Commemoration Medal.
