= Tony Doyle (rugby union) =

Irish rugby union player

Tony Doyle (born 26 April 1958 in Dublin) is a former Irish rugby union international player who played for the Irish national rugby union team. He played as a scrum-half. He played for the Ireland team in 1984, winning 2 caps and was part of the Ireland squad at the 1987 Rugby World Cup.
