= Derek McGrath (rugby union) =

Irish rugby union player

Derek McGrath (born 3 May 1960) is a former Irish rugby union international player who played for the Irish national rugby union team. Educated at St Michael's College, Dublin, he played as a flanker.

He played for the Ireland team from 1984 to 1987, winning 5 caps and was a member of the Ireland squad at 1987 Rugby World Cup. He made his debut in May 1984 against Scotland in a 9-32 defeat. McGrath is a qualified veterinary surgeon.

He was appointed as Chief Executive of European Rugby Cup (ERC) in 2000, a position he left in October 2014 rather than joining the new European Professional Club Rugby, the organisation which replaces the ERC.
