= Gareth Roberts (rugby union) =

Welsh rugby union player

- Born: Gareth John Roberts; 15 January 1959 (age 67) Pontlliw, Wales
- School: Gowerton Comprehensive
- University: University of Wales Institute of Science and Technology

Rugby union career
- Position: No. 8
Amateur team(s)
| Years | Team | Apps | (Points) |
- Pontarddulais RFC
| 1977–1984 | Swansea RFC | 191 | (369) |
| 1984–1993 | Cardiff RFC | 166 | (175) |
| 1989–1991 | Llanelli RFC | 36 | (32) |
| – | Barbarian F.C. | | |
International career
| Years | Team | Apps | (Points) |
| 1985–1987 | Wales | 7 | (12) |

Gareth John Roberts (born 15 January 1959, in Pont-Lliw) is a former international Wales rugby union player. He was in the Wales squad for the 1987 Rugby World Cup, scoring two tries. Roberts enjoyed a long first class rugby career representing Swansea, Cardiff and Llanelli. Roberts was born in Pontlliw in 1959 and educated at Pontlliw Primary and Gowerton Grammar and Comprehensive Schools. After playing Youth rugby at Pontarddulais RFC and gaining a record number of Welsh Caps at age group level (his tally of 19 included 6 at U15s, 3 at U16 and 10 at U19 level) he joined Swansea for whom he played 191 times scoring 61 tries and in 1984 moved to the Arms Park making 166 appearances for the Blue and Blacks in two spells with the club scoring 43 tries. He also played for a season at Llanelli RFC scoring 8 tries. At senior level he won 4 Welsh 'B' caps and selection for the senior team followed. He was named as a replacement 12 times before winning his first senior cap (off the bench) against France and he also represented the Barbarians.
