= Quddus Fielea =

Tongan rugby union footballer

- Born: Quddus Vusika Fielea; June 19, 1966 (age 60) Kolomotu'a

Rugby union career
- Position(s): Wing & Center
International career
Years	Team	Apps	(Points)
1987-1994	Tonga	15	(8)
Coaching career
- Years: Team
- 2007: Tonga
- 2008: Pacific Islanders

Quddus Vusika Fielea (Tongan: Kutusi Fielea), (born 1 July 1967) is a former Tongan rugby union footballer and a current coach. He played as a wing.

Fielea had 11 caps for Tonga, from 1987 to 1991, scoring 2 tries, 8 points in aggregate. The Tongan wing played all the three matches at the 1987 Rugby World Cup finals, scoring a try in the 16–29 defeat to Wales.

Fielea after ending his player career, become a coach. He was later nominated coach of Tonga, which qualified by repechage for the 2007 Rugby World Cup campaign. Fielea reached the best results ever for his country, with wins over United States and Samoa, which had defeated them 50–28 in the qualifying round. Under Fielea, Tonga also lost to South Africa by 25–30, earning a bonus point. It was expected that they could have a similar result with England, but they lost 20–36, still performing strongly. Fielea achieved the qualification for the 2011 Rugby World Cup finals by finishing in 3rd place.

He was the coach of the Pacific Islanders during their tour of Europe in 2008.

Sporting positions
Preceded by (Australia) Adam Leach	Tonga National Rugby Union Coach; 2007-2010	Succeeded by (New Zealand) Isitolo Maka
