= Mike Kiernan =

Irish rugby union player

- Born: Michael Joseph Kiernan; 17 January 1961 (age 65) Cork, Ireland
- School: Presentation Brothers College, Cork (PBC)
- Notable relative(s): Tom Kiernan (uncle); Mick Lane (uncle)

Rugby union career
- Position: Centre
Senior career
Years	Team	Apps	(Points)
- Dolphin RFC
International career
Years	Team	Apps	(Points)
1982–1991	Ireland	43	(308)
1983	British Lions	3	(0)

Michael Joseph Kiernan (born 17 January 1961) is a former Ireland international rugby union player.

He had 43 caps for Ireland, from 1982 to 1991, scoring 6 tries, 40 conversions, 62 penalties and 6 drop goals, in an aggregate of 308 points. He was selected for the 1987 Rugby World Cup, playing in three games and scoring 1 try, 7 conversions, 5 penalties and 1 drop goal, in an aggregate of 37 points.

In 1983, he toured New Zealand with the British and Irish Lions and at the time played club rugby for Dolphin RFC. His uncle, Tom Kiernan, was also an Ireland rugby union international and Lions player, as was his maternal uncle Mick Lane.
