= Asa Amone =

Tongan dual-code international rugby player

Personal information
- Full name: Aasaeli Amone
- Born: 8 January 1966 (age 60) Tonga

Playing information

Rugby union
- Position: Fly-half
Representative
Years	Team	Pld	T	G	FG	P
1987–88	Tonga	4	0	4	0	12

Rugby league
- Position: Fullback, Wing, Centre, Prop
Club
Years	Team	Pld	T	G	FG	P
1995–97	Halifax Blue Sox	69	13	6	0	64
1998–99	Featherstone Rovers	60	4	0	0	16
2000–01	Doncaster Dragons	46	3	0	0	12
	Total	175	20	6	0	92
Representative
Years	Team	Pld	T	G	FG	P
1994–95	Tonga	4	2	13	0	34

Aasaeli "Asa" Amone (born 8 January 1966) is a Tongan former dual code international rugby union and rugby league footballer. He played representative rugby union for Tonga, as a fly-half, and representative rugby league (RL) for Tonga, and at club level for Halifax Blue Sox and Featherstone Rovers, as a fullback, wing, centre or prop.

== Rugby union ==
Amone played four times for Tonga in 1987, including twice in the 1987 Rugby World Cup.

== Rugby league ==
Amone later switched to rugby league, playing in New Zealand for Mount Albert in the Auckland Rugby League competition before moving to Australia, where he played Country Rugby League in New South Wales. He was noted for appearances for the Australian club Orange Hawks.

He played for Tonga in the 1995 Rugby League World Cup.

Amone made his début for Featherstone Rovers on Sunday 1 February 1998, and he played his last match for Featherstone Rovers during the 1999 season.

Amone was a playing interchange/substitute in Featherstone Rovers' 22-24 defeat by Wakefield Trinity in the 1998 First Division Grand Final at McAlpine Stadium, Huddersfield on 26 September 1998.

In 2006 he joined the Qantas Cyms team.

== Post-playing ==
As of 2011, he worked in a mine in Western Australia.
