= Ballymore Stadium =

Multifunctional Australian stadium in Brisbane

- Ballymore
- Interactive map of Ballymore Stadium
- Location: 91 Clyde Road, Herston, Brisbane, Queensland 4006
- Coordinates: 27°26′31″S 153°1′4″E
- Owner: Queensland Rugby Union
- Operator: Queensland Rugby Union
- Capacity: 8,000
- Surface: Grass
- Field shape: Rectangular

Construction
- Opened: 1966; 60 years ago
- Renovated: 2021–2023
- Years active: 1966–2020; 2023–present
- Cost: A$31.5 million (2021 renovation)
- Architect: Blight Rayner Architecture (2021 renovation)
- Builder: Buildcorp (2021 renovation)
- Project manager: RPS (2021 renovation)

Tenants
- Super Rugby AUS Queensland Reds (2025–present) Other Australia women's rugby union team (select matches)

Website
- ballymorestadium.com.au

Ballymore Stadium, known simply as Ballymore, is a rectangular stadium located in the Brisbane suburb of Herston in the Australian state of Queensland. It is the headquarters of the Queensland Rugby Union (QRU) and the Australia women's national rugby union team, and is currently host to the Queensland Reds in the Super Rugby AUS. The Ballymore site also hosts several rectangular pitch's as well as the National Rugby Training Centre (NRTC), a state-of-the-art training facility.

== History ==
The Queensland Rugby Union (QRU) set up its headquarters at Ballymore in 1966 under a deed of grant from the Queensland state government. The first club game played at the new site was a match between Teachers and Wests. The QRU moved in February 1967. In March of the following year Ballymore's grandstand was officially opened. The QRU was given the ownership and management of the site under the Deed of Grant in Trust (DOGIT) in 1973.

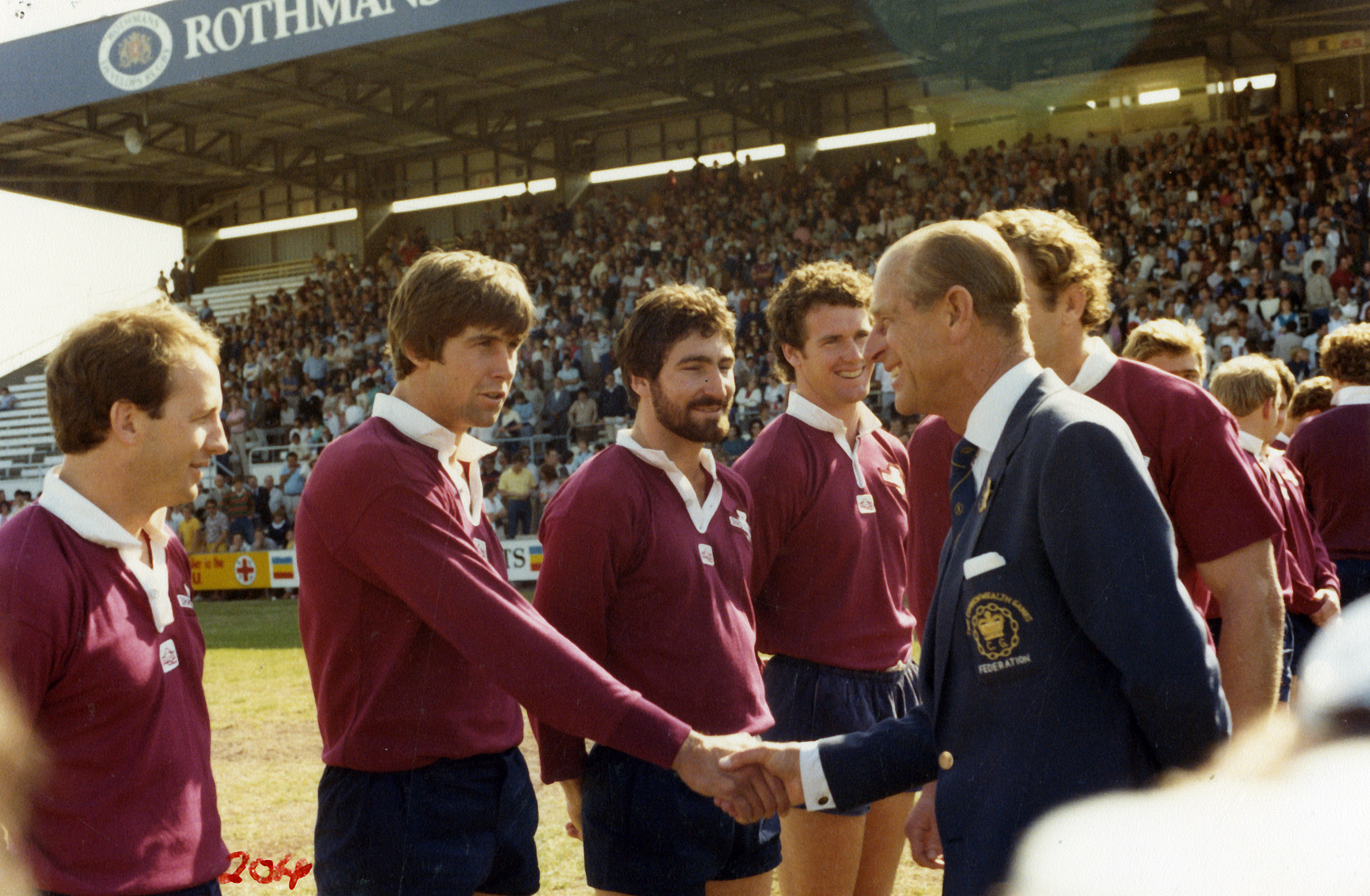
HRH The Duke of Edinburgh greeting the Queensland Rugby Union team at Ballymore Stadium in October 1982

The Eastern Stand was opened on 21 June 1992. The ground exceeded capacity in 1993 when 26,000 watched the Wallabies play South Africa. A year later the first match under lights was played at the ground. Today the grandstand is known as the McLean Stand (named in 1982 after the McLean family). The Eastern stand is known as the Bank of Queensland (BOQ) stand.

The Queensland Reds played their home matches at Ballymore from 1967 until 2005. Their Super Rugby matches were moved to Lang Park for the 2006 season but they still played their home games in the 2006 Australian Provincial Championship at Ballymore. The stadium also hosted the Ballymore Tornadoes during the only season of the Australian Rugby Championship (ARC) in 2007.

Field hockey, an event in the Summer Olympics, is expected to be hosted at Ballymore Stadium during the 2032 Summer Olympics in Brisbane. In a 2018 report entitled "Stadium Taskforce Report", the Queensland state government declared Ballymore Stadium not suitable for a major stadium facility because it doesn't meet modern access standards. Instead, the Taskforce believes Ballymore is better suited for training, local club use, and administration for rugby and similar sports, rather than for hosting large-scale events.

== Present use ==
Though the Reds have since moved out of Ballymore to Suncorp Stadium, which has a greater capacity, Ballymore is still the host to many rugby union matches. The Queensland Premier Rugby finals are held at the ground, and Queensland XV and off-season matches for the Reds are also played at Ballymore. From 2014 until 2019, Brisbane City held its home National Rugby Championship matches at the stadium.

The QRU has plans to redevelop the site to include a high performance centre comprising advanced sports medicine and training facilities, a gymnasium and aquatic facilities, as well as on-site accommodation for visiting teams, with Brisbane firm Blight Rayner as architects for the project.

Ballymore was the planned home venue for Brisbane City's failed bid to join the A-League. In November 2018, a planned friendly football match between South Korea and Uzbekistan had to be moved to QSAC due to the poor state of the pitch.

In February 2021 demolition and construction works commenced on the stadium and surrounding precinct, to allow for the creation of the National Rugby Training Centre. The McLean Stand was demolished in February 2021, and will be replaced by the indoor training centre which includes a new grandstand capable of seating 3010 spectators, and also features corporate facilities, a 700 square-metre gym, rehabilitation areas, a 75-seat auditorium, a 120-seat function room, changing rooms and offices. A second rugby field with surrounding offices is included in the masterplan, though has not been constructed.

The National Rugby Training Centre (NRTC) will be the headquarters for the Australia women's national rugby union team (the Wallaroos) and a training site for the Queensland Reds men's, women's and academy teams.

== 1987 Rugby World Cup ==
Ballymore hosted five matches of the 1987 Rugby World Cup. These matches were:

Date	Competition	Team	Score	Team	Attendance
24 May 1987	1987 Rugby World Cup Pool 1	Japan	8–21	United States	4,000
31 May 1987	1987 Rugby World Cup Pool 1	Australia	47–12	United States	10,855
3 June 1987	1987 Rugby World Cup Pool 2	Ireland	32–9	Tonga	4,000
8 June 1987	1987 Rugby World Cup Quarter-final	England	7–16	Wales	15,000
14 June 1987	1987 Rugby World Cup Semi-final	New Zealand	49–6	Wales	22,576

== Australia women's rugby matches ==
Date	Home	Score	Away	Attendance	Competition	Ref.
14 July 2024	Australia	0–62	New Zealand	5,365	2024 Laurie O'Reilly Cup	
26 July 2025	Australia	12–21	Wales	—N/a	2025 Women's Rugby World Cup warm-up match	

== See also ==
- Rugby union in Queensland
- Queensland Rugby Union
