= Adrian Hadley =

Welsh dual-code rugby footballer

- Born: Adrian Michael Hadley; 1 March 1963 (age 63) Cardiff, Wales
- Height: 6 ft 1 in (1.85 m)

Rugby union career
- Position(s): Wing, Centre
Amateur team(s)
Years	Team	Apps	(Points)
1982-1988	Cardiff RFC	197	(479)
1985-1987	Barbarian F.C.	3	(12)
Senior career
Years	Team	Apps	(Points)
1997	Sale Sharks		
International career
Years	Team	Apps	(Points)
1983-1988	Wales	27	(36)
- Rugby league career

Playing information
- Position: Wing
Club
Years	Team	Pld	T	G	FG	P
1988–1992	Salford	98	61	4	0	260
1992–1995	Widnes	83	27	101	0	310
	Total	181	88	105	0	570
Representative
Years	Team	Pld	T	G	FG	P
1991–1995	Wales	9	1	0	0	4

Adrian Michael Hadley (born 1 March 1963) is a Welsh former dual-code international rugby union and professional rugby league footballer who played in the 1980s and 1990s, and coached rugby union in the 1990s and 2000s. He played representative rugby union (RU) for Wales (including in the 1987 Rugby World Cup), at invitational level for the Barbarians F.C., and at club level for Cardiff RFC, and the Sale Sharks, as a wing, or centre, and representative rugby league (RL) for Wales, and at club level for Salford and Widnes, as a wing, and coached club level rugby union (RU) for Sale Sharks.

== Background ==
Adrian Hadley was born in Cardiff, Wales, he was a pupil at Lady Mary High School.

== Rugby union career ==
Hadley attained 29 caps for the Wales rugby union team between 1983 and 1988, scoring nine tries. He was selected for the 1987 Rugby World Cup, helping Wales finish in third place. His most memorable game for Wales was in the team's opening match of the 1988 Five Nations against England at Twickenham, scoring two tries in a 11–3 win.

== Rugby league career ==
=== Salford ===
Hadley later switched codes and moved north to join Salford and represented the Wales national rugby league team. He played left wing in Salford's 17–22 defeat by Wigan in the 1988 Lancashire Cup Final during the 1988–89 season at Knowsley Road, St Helens on Sunday 23 October 1988, and played left wing in the 24–18 defeat by Widnes in the 1990 Lancashire Cup Final during the 1990–91 season at Central Park, Wigan on Saturday 29 September 1990.

=== Widnes ===
Hadley was then signed by Phil Larder the then coach at Widnes in 1992. While at Widnes, he played for Wales in the 1995 Rugby League World Cup, but left Widnes shortly after the tournament due to a dispute over unpaid wages.

== Coaching ==
He returned to rugby union as player-coach at Sale Sharks in 1996, later becoming director of rugby at the side. He resigned from the post in 2001.
