= Alamoni Liavaʻa =

Tongan rugby union player

- Born: Epalahame Liavaʻa; 1959 (age 66–67) Tonga
- Height: 1.70 m (5 ft 7 in)
- Weight: 82 kg (181 lb)
- School: Auckland Grammar School
- Notable relative: Sione Liavaʻa (brother)

Rugby union career
- Position: Centre
Provincial / State sides
Years	Team	Apps	(Points)
- Hihifo Rugby Club
International career
Years	Team	Apps	(Points)
1979-1987	Tonga	15	(33)

Epalahame Liavaʻa, better known as Alamoni Liavaʻa (born circa 1959) is a Tongan former rugby union player. He played as centre. He is known by his nickname "Moni"

== Career ==
His first cap for Tonga was against England, in Nuku'alofa, on 1 June 1979. Between 1985 and 1987, Liava'a captained Tonga. He was also present in the 1987 Rugby World Cup squad, where he was the vice-captain. He played all the three pool stage matches and scored a conversion kick in the match against Wales. His last match for Tonga was also in that year's World Cup, against Ireland, in Brisbane. He also represented Tonga in rugby league at the 1986 Pacific Cup.

== After career and deportation ==
In the 1993, years after his retirement as rugby player, Liavaʻa got involved with the drug trafficking business. He smuggled cocaine to New Zealand by stuffing it inside yams. He also had contacts with the Hawaii-based drug boss Richard "Tiki" Taumoepeau. After being caught by the New Zealand Police through wiretapping, Liavaʻa was put under surveillance and was sentenced to 12 years imprisonment and deported back to Tonga, where he lives a hermit-like lifestyle on the west of Tongatapu.

== Personal life ==
He is the brother of the late Sione Liava'a, former chairman of the Tonga Public Service Commission.
