= 1990 New Zealand rugby union tour of France =

Summary
P	W	D	L
Total
8	6	0	2
Test match
2	2	0	0
Opponent
P	W	D	L
France
2	2	0	0

The 1990 New Zealand rugby union tour of France was a series of matches played between October and November 1990 in France by New Zealand national rugby union team

== Results ==
Scores and results list New Zealand's points tally first.

Opposing Team	For	Against	Date	Venue	Status
Provence/Cote D'Azur Invitation XV	15	19	17 October 1990	Stade Mayol, Toulon	Tour match
Languedoc Selection	22	6	20 October 1990	Parc des Sports, Narbonne	Tour match
French XV	27	24	24 October 1990	St.Amédée-Domenech, Brive	Tour match
French Barbarians	23	13	27 October 1990	Stade Alfred Armandie, Agen	Tour match
Cote Basque-Landes	12	18	30 October 1990	Stade J. Dauger, Bayonne	Tour match
France	24	3	3 November 1990	La Beaujoire, Nantes	Test match
French XV	22	15	6 November 1990	St.Marcel-Deflandre, La Rochelle	Tour match
France	30	12	10 November 1990	Parc des Princes, Paris	Test match

== Touring party ==
- Coach: Alex Wyllie
- Captain: Gary Whetton

=== Backs ===
- Shayne Philpott (Canterbury)
- Kieran Crowley (Taranaki)
- John Timu (Otago)
- Craig Innes (Auckland)
- John Kirwan (Auckland)
- Terry Wright (Auckland)
- Va'aiga Tuigamala (Auckland)
- Bernie McCahill (Auckland)
- Walter Little (North Harbour)
- Joe Stanley (Auckland)
- Grant Fox (Auckland)
- Simon Mannix (Wellington)
- Graeme Bachop (Canterbury)
- Paul McGahan (North Harbour)

=== Forwards ===
- Steve McDowall (Auckland)
- Graham Purvis (Waikato)
- Olo Brown (Auckland)
- Richard Loe (Canterbury)
- Laurence Hullena (Wellington)
- Sean Fitzpatrick (Auckland)
- Warren Gatland (Waikato)
- Gary Whetton (Auckland)
- Ian Jones (North Auckland)
- Steve Gordon (Waikato)
- Murray Pierce (Wellington)
- Michael Jones (Auckland)
- Mike Brewer (Otago)
- Zinzan Brooke (Auckland)
- Paul Henderson (Southland)
- Alan Whetton (Auckland)
- Rob Gordon (Waikato)
