= 1991 New Zealand rugby union tour of Argentina =

Summary
P	W	D	L
Total
9	9	0	0
Test match
2	2	0	0
Opponent
P	W	D	L
Argentina
2	2	0	0

The 1991 New Zealand rugby union tour of Argentina was a series of matches played in June and July 1991 in Argentina by New Zealand national rugby union team.

== Squad ==
Player/pos.	Match Played	Score				Total points
Player/pos.	Match Played	tries	conv.	pen.	drop	Total points
Graeme Bachop (Half-Back)	6	1				4
Mike Brewer (Forward)	2					0
Zinzan Brooke (Forward)	6	3				12
Kieran Crowley (Full Back)	5	1	4	4	2	30
Ian Jones (Forward)	4					0
Andy Earl (Forward)	7	1				4
Sean Fitzpatrick (Forward)	6	2				8
Grant Fox (Half-Back)	5		13	16		74
Warren Gatland (Forward)	3					0
Steve Gordon (Forward)	3					0
Paul Henderson (Forward)	6	2				8
Laurence Hullena (Forward)	4					0
Craig Innes (Three-Quarter)	6	4				16
Michael Jones (Forward)	8	2				8
John Kirwan (Three-Quarter)	5	8				32
Walter Little (Three-Quarter)	5					0
Richard Loe (Forward)	5					0
Simon Mannix (Half-Back)	4	2	16	4		52
Bernie McCahill (Three-Quarter)	4	2				8
Steve McDowall (Forward)	5					0
Paul McGahan (Half-Back)	3	1				4
Shayne Philpott (Full Back)	6	3	1			14
Graham Purvis (Forward)	4					0
Joe Stanley (Three-Quarter)	4					0
John Timu (Three-Quarter)	7	9				36
Chris Tregaskis (Forward)	4					0
Alan Whetton (Forward)	3	1				4
Gary Whetton (Forward)	6	2				8
Terry Wright (Three-Quarter)	5	9				36

== Results ==
Complete list of matches played by New Zealand in Argentina:

Legend: ALU= Alumni - BAC=Belgrano Athletic Club - BCR= Buenos Aires Cricket & Rugby Club - BN= Banco Nacion - CASI=C.A. San Isidro - CP=Club Pucará - CUBA=Club Universitario B.A. - CUR=Curupaytí - CUY=Unión de Rugby de Cuyo - HC=Hindú Club - IRFU=Irish Rugby Football Union - LM=Los Materos - LP= La Plata Rugby Club - LT=Los Tilos - NEW=Club Newman - ORC=Olivos Rugby Club - PUY=Club Pueyrredón - RBV=Regatas Bella Vista - SIC=San Isidro Club - UAR=Union Argentina de Rugby - UCR= Unión Cordobesa de Rugby - ULP=Club Universitario de La Plata - URR= Unión de Rugby de Rosario - URT=Unión de Rugby de Tucumán

15 June 1991

Rosario RU	9–81	New Zealand
Pen: Crexell; Drop: Bouza, G.Del Castillo		Try: Wright 5, Timu 3 G.Whetton 2, Innes; Brooke, Henderson; Mannix Philpott; Con: Mannix 8, Philpott; Pen: Mannix

Newell's Old Boys, Rosario
Referee: Gabriel Bavio (Argentina)

ROSARIO: G.Del Castillo: M.Airaldi, G.Romero Acuña, F.Del Castillo, G.Sarrabayrouse; L.Bouza, R.Crexell; F.Rossi, L.Oviedo, M.Sugasti (41' G.García); E.Pitinari, M.Palau (55' P.Baraldi); M.Mansilla (44' P.Manavella), M.Baraldi, V.Jimenez.
NEW ZEALAND: S.Philpott; J.Timu; C.Innes, W.Little, T.Wright; S.Mannix, (G.Bachop), M.Jones (1' P.Henderson), Z.Brooke, A.Earl: C. Tregaskis, G.Whetton (Capt); R.Loe, S.Fitzpatrick, L.Hullena.

19 June 1991

Córdoba RU	9–38	New Zealand
Try: Garzón; Con: Menéndez; Pen: Menéndez		Try: Timu 2, Innes; McCahill, Kirwan; Crowley; Con: Fox 4 Pen: Fox 2

Club Belgrano, Córdoba
Referee: Marcelo Firpo (Argentina)

CORDOBA: J.Caminotti; E.Quetglas, J.Arias (41' M.Gil), P.Garzón (capt.), N.Andreossi, M.Menéndez, G.Schroeder; L.Bedoya, J.Simes, J.Durante; E.Giaimo, D.Pereyra; A.Centeno, J.Bernardi, A.Mammana.
NUEVA ZELANDA: K.Crowley; J.Kirwan, C.Innes (15' S.Philpott), B.McCahill, J.Timu; G.Fox, P.McGahan; P.Henderson, M.Brewer (70' Z.Brooke), A.Earl; I.Jones, S.Gordon; G.Purvis, W.Gatland, L.Hullena.

22 June 1991

Buenos Aires RU	9–37	New Zealand
Try: Lombardi		Try: Kirwan 3, Wright 2 Bachop; Con: Mannix 2 Pen: Lanfranco

Vélez Sarsfield, Buenos Aires
Referee: Miguel Peyrone (Rosario)

BUENOS AIRES: L.Criscuolo (ALU); M.Habib (BCR), A.Marguerie (NEW), M.Lanfranco (NEW), A.Tolomei (CUBA.); F.Mendez (LT), G.Holmgren (ORC); J.Damio¬li (ULP), R.Etchegoyen (BN), F.Irarrazaval (NEW): M.Lombardi (ALU), G.Ugartemendía (LM); E.Noriega (HC), M.Bosch (Olivos Rugby Club|ORC), A.Rocca (BCR) (capt.).
New Zealand: S.Philpott; J.Kirwan, J.Stanley, W.Little, T.Wright; S.Mannix, (G.Bachop); M.Jones, Z.Brooke, A.Earl; G.Whetton (capt.), C. Tregaskis; G.Purvis, S.Fitzpatrick, S.McDowall.

25 June 1991

Tucumán RU	9–21	New Zealand
Pen: Mesón 3		Try: A.Whetton, Kirwan; Con: Fox 2 Pen: Fox 3

Monumental José Fierro, Tucumán
Referee: Efraim Sklar (Argentina)

TUCUMAN: F.Williams: M.Terán, J.Gianotti, S.Mesón, G.Terán; R.Sauze, R.Zelarrayán; P.Garretón, J.Santamarina (capt.), F.Buabse; P.Buabse, C.Gentile (P.Micheli 59'); L.Molina, R.Le Fort, J.Coria.
NEW ZEALAND: K.Crowley; J.Kirwan, B.Mc.Cahill, J.Stanley, J.Timu; G.Fox, (G.Bachop); P.Henderson, M.Brewer (M.Jones 33'), A.Whetton; G.Whetton (capt.), I.Jones; R.Loe, S.Fitzpatrick, S.McDowall.

29 June 1991

Argentina B	6–22	New Zealand
Pen: Laborde; Drop: Laborde		Try: Kirwan 2, M.Jones; Pen: Fox 2 Drop: Fox 2

Vélez Sarsfield, Buenos Aires
Referee: José Luís Rolandi (Argentina)

ARGENTINA B: G.Angaut (capt.), (LP); G.Jorge (CP), P.Garzón (UCR), M.Allen (CASI), C.Mendy (LT); E.Laborde (CP – 55' F.Mendez - LT), G.Camardón (ALU); M.Ber¬tranou (CUY), P.Camerlinckx (RGV), F.Buabse (URT); M.Lombardi (ALU), P.Buabse (URT); M.Urbano (BCR, M.Bosch (ORC), M.Aguirre (ALU)
NEW ZEALAND: T.Wright; J.Kirwan (60' S.Philpott), C.Innes, W.Little, J.Timu; G.Fox (capt.), P.McGahan; M.Jones, Z.Brooke, A.Earl; Steve Gordon, C. Tregaskis; G.Purvis, W.Gatland, L.Hullena.

2 July 1991

Cuyo RU	12–47	New Zealand
Try: Gómez; Con: Cremaschi; Pen: Cremaschi 2		Try: Timu 2, Fitzpatrick 2 Philpott, Mannix; Con: Crowley 4 Pen: Crowley 4 Drop: Crowley

Independiente Rivadavia, Mendoza
Referee: P.Bleckwedel (Tucumán)

CUYO: F.Lola; Bazzana, C.Cipitelli (capt.), Cremaschi, E.Saurina; Gioeni, F.Silvestre; M.Bertranou, S.Gómez, M.Cassonel P.Pérez Caffe, G.Correa Llano; P.Miranda, A.Gutiérrez, F.Mendez.
NEW ZEALAND: K.Crowley, J.Timu, J.Stanley, B.McCahill, S.Philpott; S.Mannix, (G.Bachop); P.Henderson, M.Jones, A.Whetton; I.Jones, G.Whetton (capt.); R.Loe, S.Fitzpatrick; S.McDowall.

=== First test ===
6 July 1991

Argentina	14–28	New Zealand
Try: Garretón, Carreras; Pen: Vidou 2		Try: Earl, Wright; Con: Fox; Pen: Fox 5 Drop: Croes¬ley

Vélez Sarsfield, Buenos Aires
Referee: Brian Stirling (Ireland)

Team details

Argentina	New Zealand

ARGENTINA: G.del Castillo (URR); M.Terán (URT), H.García Simón (PUY), S.Mesón (URT), D.Cuesta Silva (SIC); L.Arbizu (BAC), H.Vidou (BCR); J.Santamarina (URT)., M.Carreras (ORC), J.Garretón (URT); P.Sporleder (CUR), G.Llanes (LP): D.Cash (SIC), R.Le Fort (URT), F.Mendez (CUY).
NEW ZEALAND: K.Crowley; J.Timu, C.Innes, W.Little, T.Wright; G.Fox, (G.Bachop); P.Henderson, M.Jones, A.Whetton (30' A.Earl); G.Whetton (capt.), I.Jones; R.Loe, S.Fitzpatrick, S.Mc.Dowall.

9 July 1991

Mar del Plata RU	6–48	New Zealand
		Try: Innes 2,.Timu 2 McGahan, McCahill; Philpott, Brooke; Hender¬son; Con: Mannix 6 Pen: Gilardi, Casagna

José M. Minella, Mar del Plata
Referee: Ricardo Bordcoch (Córdoba)

MAR DEL PLATA: D.Casagna; G.Desbots, M.Gilardi, D.Meyrelles, J.Chaubel; M.Martínez Etayo, F.Fernández Monteverde; D.Giardelli, O.Lanfranconi, R.Roselli (J.Torrebruno); L.Queral, B.Anastasia; A.Bombini, E.Langdon Sagasta, J.Hernando (L.Reggiardo).
NEW ZEALAND: S.Philpott; J.Timu, J.Stanley (capt.), B.McCahill, C.Innes; S.Mannix, P.McGahan; P.Henderson, Z.Brooke, A.Earl C. Tregaskis, Steve Gordon; G.Purvis, W.Gatland, L.Hullena.

=== Second test ===
13 July 1991

Argentina	6–36	New Zealand
Pen: Del Castillo 2		Try: Brooke, M.Jones; Kirwan, Wright; Con: Fox 4 Pen: Fox 4

Vélez Sarsfield, Buenos Aires
Referee: Brian Stirling (Ireland)

Team details

Argentina	New Zealand

ARGENTINA: G.Del Castillo (URR); M.Terán (URT – 50' S.Mesón-URT – 77' G.Angaut-LP), H.García Simón (PUY), M.Allen (CASI), D.Cuesta Silva (SIC); L.Arbizu (BAC), G.Camardón (ALU); J.Santamarina (URT), M.Carreras (ORC), P.Garretón (URT) (capt.); G.Lla¬nas (LP), P.Sporleder (CUR); D.Cash (SIC), R.Le Fort (URT), F.Mendez (CUY).
NEW ZEALAND: K.Crowley; J.Kirwan, C.Innes, W.Little, T.Wright; G.Fox, (G.Bachop); M.Jones, Z.Brooke, A.Earl; G.Whetton (capt.), I.Jones; R.Loe, S.Fitzpatrick, S.McDowall.
