= 1989 New Zealand rugby union tour of Canada and the British Isles =

Summary
P	W	D	L
Total
14	14	0	0
Test match
2	2	0	0
Opponent
P	W	D	L
Ireland
1	1	0	0
Wales
1	1	0	0

The New Zealand national rugby union team toured Canada and the Britain and Ireland in October and November 1989, playing test matches against the national teams of Wales and Ireland and tour matches against 12 other sides, including the Barbarians. They went unbeaten on the tour, winning all 14 matches.

== Squad ==
- Coach: Alex Wyllie

Name	Position	Province
Sean Fitzpatrick	Hooker	Auckland
Warren Gatland	Hooker	Waikato
Richard Loe	Prop	Canterbury
Steve McDowall	Prop	Auckland
Graham Purvis	Prop	Waikato
Ron Williams	Prop	North Harbour
Steve Gordon	Lock	Waikato
Ian Jones	Lock	North Auckland
Murray Pierce	Lock	Wellington
Gary Whetton	Lock	Auckland
Andy Earl	Flanker	Wellington
Paul Henderson	Flanker	Southland
Kevin Schuler	Flanker	North Harbour
Mike Brewer	Loose forward	Otago
Zinzan Brooke	Loose forward	Auckland
Buck Shelford (captain)	Loose forward	North Harbour
Alan Whetton	Loose forward	Auckland
Graeme Bachop	Halfback	Canterbury
Bruce Deans	Halfback	Canterbury
Frano Botica	First five-eighth	North Harbour
Grant Fox	First five-eighth	Auckland
John Schuster	Second five-eighth	Wellington
Craig Innes	Centre	Auckland
Walter Little	Centre & Five-eighth	North Harbour
Bernie McCahill	Centre	Auckland
Joe Stanley	Centre	Auckland
John Kirwan	Wing	Auckland
Inga Tuigamala	Wing	Auckland
Terry Wright	Wing	Auckland
John Gallagher	Fullback	Wellington
Matthew Ridge	Fullback	Auckland
John Timu	Fullback	Otago

== Results ==
Scores and results list New Zealand's points tally first.

Opposing Team	For	Against	Date	Venue	Status
British Columbia	48	3	8 October 1989	Swangard Stadium, Vancouver	Tour match
Cardiff	25	15	14 October 1989	Arms Park, Cardiff	Tour match
Pontypool RFC	47	6	18 October 1989	Pontypool	Tour match
Swansea	37	22	21 October 1989	St. Helen's, Swansea	Tour match
Neath RFC	26	15	25 October 1989	The Gnoll, Neath	Tour match
Llanelli RFC	11	0	28 October 1989	Stradey Park, Llanelli	Tour match
Newport	54	9	31 October 1989	Rodney Parade, Newport	Tour match
Wales	34	9	4 November 1989	Arms Park, Cardiff	Test match
Leinster	36	9	8 November 1989	Lansdowne Road, Dublin	Tour match
Munster	31	9	11 November 1989	Cork	Tour match
Connacht	40	6	14 November 1989	Galway	Tour match
Ireland	23	6	18 November 1989	Lansdowne Road, Dublin	Test match
Ulster	21	3	21 November 1989	Ravenhill, Belfast	Tour match
Barbarians	21	10	25 November 1989	Twickenham, London	Tour match

=== British Columbia vs New Zealand ===
8 October 1989

British Columbia	3–48	New Zealand
Pen: Wyatt	Report	Try: Brooke (2); Deans (2); Little; Stanley; Tuigamala; Con: Gallagher (7); Pen: Gallagher (2)

Swangard Stadium, Burnaby
Attendance: 7,000
Referee: Keith Morrison (Vancouver)

=== Cardiff vs New Zealand ===
14 October 1989
14:30

Cardiff	15–25	New Zealand
Try: Edwards; Con: Rayer; Pen: Evans (2); Rayer	Report	Try: Brewer; Loe; A. J. Whetton; Con: Fox (2); Pen: Fox (3)

Cardiff Arms Park, Cardiff
Attendance: 30,000
Referee: Ray Megson (Scotland)

=== Pontypool vs New Zealand ===
18 October 1989
14:30

Pontypool	6–47	New Zealand
Pen: Silva (2)	Report	Try: Bachop; Botica; Fitzpatrick; John Gallagher; Jones; Kirwan; Little; Tuigamala; Con: Gallagher (3); Pen: Gallagher (3)

Pontypool Park, Pontypool
Attendance: 23,000
Referee: Brian Sterling (Ireland)

=== Swansea vs New Zealand ===
21 October 1989
14:30

Swansea	22–37	New Zealand
Try: Arnold; I. Davies; Hopkins; Con: Wyatt (2); Pen: Wyatt (2)	Report	Try: Brewer (2); Deans; Gatland; Innes (2); Con: Botica (5); Pen: Botica

St. Helen's Rugby and Cricket Ground, Swansea
Attendance: 18,000
Referee: Nicolas Hourquet (France)

=== Neath vs New Zealand ===
25 October 1989
14:30

Neath	15–26	New Zealand
Try: Edmunds; Con: Thorburn; Pen: Thorburn (3)	Report	Try: Brooke; Gallagher (2); Innes; Con: Botica (2); Pen: Botica (2)

The Gnoll, Neath
Attendance: 10,000
Referee: Fred Howard (England)

=== Llanelli vs New Zealand ===
28 October 1989
14:30

Llanelli	0–11	New Zealand
	Report	Try: Earl; McDowall; Pen: Fox

Stradey Park, Llanelli
Attendance: 18,000
Referee: Ken McCartney (Scotland)

=== Newport vs New Zealand ===
31 October 1989
14:30

Newport	9–54	New Zealand
Try: Gregory; Con: Abraham; Pen: Abraham	Report	Try: Bachop; Brooke; Gallagher (2); McCahill; Schuler; Timu; Wright; Con: Fox (7)

Rodney Parade, Newport
Attendance: 15,000
Referee: Owen Doyle (Ireland)

=== Wales vs New Zealand ===
4 November 1989

Wales	9–34	New Zealand
Pen: Thorburn (3)	Report	Try: Bachop; Innes (2); Wright; Con: Fox (3); Pen: Fox (4)

Cardiff Arms Park, Cardiff
Attendance: 55,000
Referee: Sandy MacNeill (Australia)

=== Leinster vs New Zealand ===
8 November 1989
14:45

Leinster	9–36	New Zealand
Try: Sexton; Con: B. Smith; Pen: B. Smith	Report	Try: Brooke; Innes; Jones; McCahill; Timu (2); G. Whetton; Con: Botica (4)

Lansdowne Road, Dublin
Attendance: 18,000
Referee: Guy Maurette (France)

=== Munster vs New Zealand ===
11 November 1989
14:30

Munster	9–31	New Zealand
Pen: Keyes (3)	Report	Try: Bachop; Innes; Pierce; Schuster; Con: Fox (3); Pen: Fox (3)

Musgrave Park, Cork
Attendance: 18,000
Referee: David Leslie (Scotland)

=== Connacht vs New Zealand ===
14 November 1989
14:30

Connacht	6–40	New Zealand
Pen: O'Beirne (2)	Report	Try: Botica (3); Deans; Earl (2); Ridge; Tuigamala; Con: Botica; Pen: Botica (2)

Galway Sportsgrounds, Galway
Attendance: 8,000
Referee: Les Peard (Wales)

=== Ireland vs New Zealand ===
18 November 1989

Ireland	6–23	New Zealand
Pen: B. Smith	Report	Try: Gallagher; Shelford; Wright; Con: Fox; Pen: Fox (3)

Lansdowne Road, Dublin
Attendance: 55,000
Referee: Sandy MacNeill (Australia)

=== Ulster vs New Zealand ===
21 November 1989
19:30

Ulster	3–21	New Zealand
Pen: Russell	Report	Try: Brooke; Tuigamala; Con: Botica (2); Pen: Botica (3)

Ravenhill Stadium, Belfast
Attendance: 23,000
Referee: Ian Bullerwell (England)

=== Barbarians vs New Zealand ===
25 November 1989

Barbarians	10–21	New Zealand
Try: Matthews; Pen: Hastings (2)	Report	Try: Brooke; Innes; Loe; Con: Fox (3); Pen: Fox

Twickenham Stadium, London
Attendance: 60,000
Referee: Clive Norling (Wales)
