= New Zealand at the Rugby World Cup =

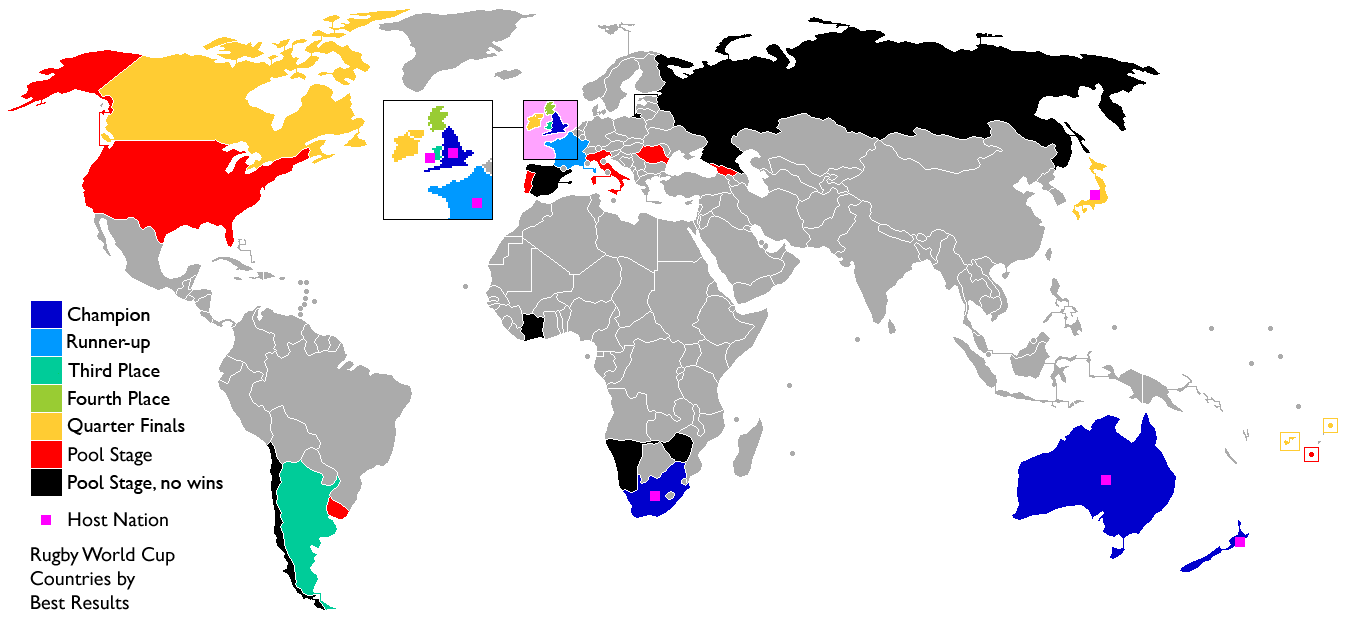
Map of nations' best results, excluding nations which participated unsuccessfully in qualifying tournaments

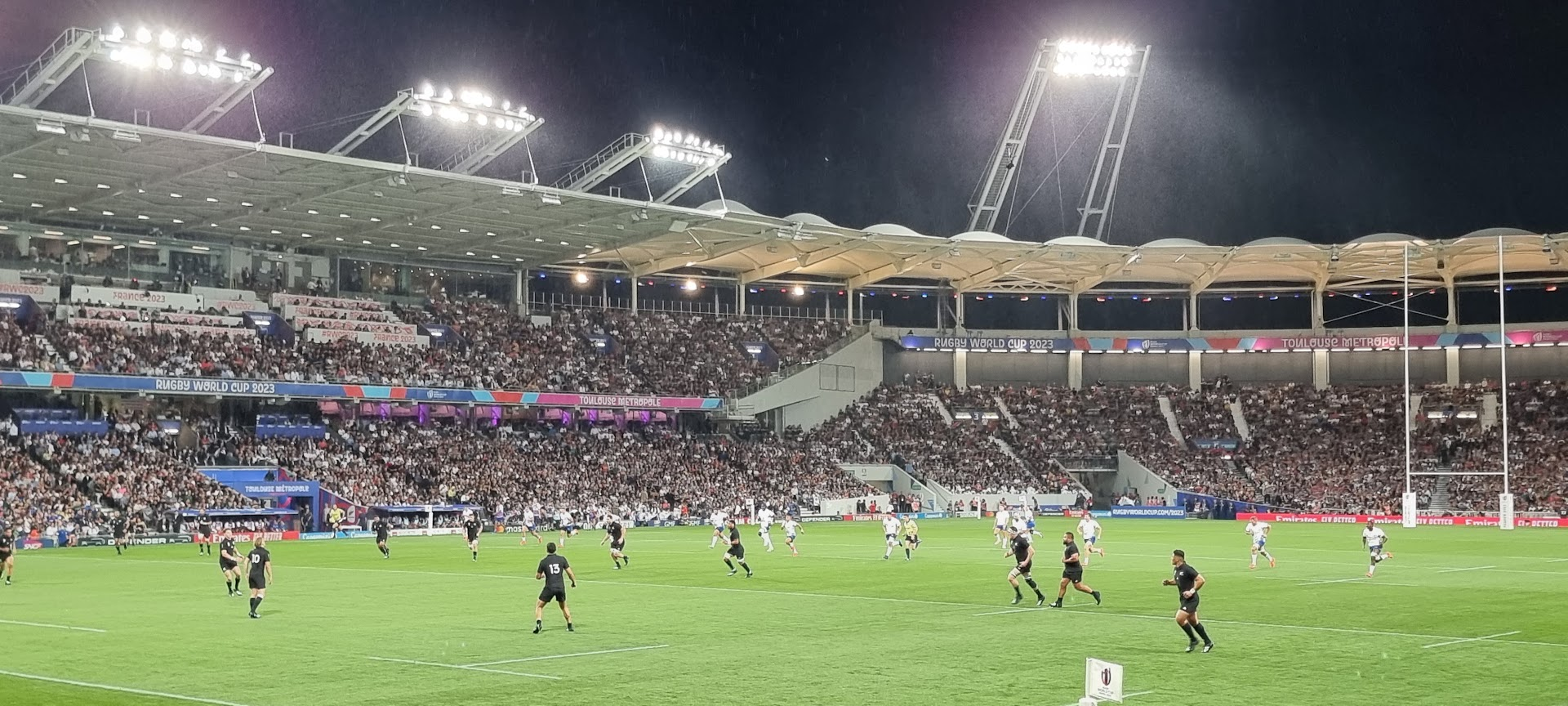
2023 Rugby World Cup match between New Zealand (All Blacks) and Namibia.

The New Zealand men's national rugby union team, known as the All Blacks, have played 56 matches so far in the nine Rugby World Cup tournaments from 1987 to 2019, with an additional match cancelled and unplayed. They won the 1987, 2011, and 2015 tournaments. Until 2023, they qualified in first place from every group until they lost their first pool match in 2023 RWC against France. Their worst performance was in 2007 when they lost a quarter-final to France. They have made it to at least the semi-finals at all the other tournaments.

New Zealand hosted the inaugural tournament in 1987 with Australia as a co-host. New Zealand was the sole host of the 2011 tournament.

== By position ==
Rugby World Cup record
Year	Round	Pld	W	D	L	PF	PA	Squad
(New Zealand) (Australia) 1987	Champions	6	6	0	0	298	52	Squad
(England) (France) (Ireland) (Scotland) (Wales) 1991	Third place	6	5	0	1	143	74	Squad
(South Africa) 1995	Runners-up	6	5	0	1	327	119	Squad
(Wales) 1999	Fourth place	6	4	0	2	255	111	Squad
(Australia) 2003	Third place	7	6	0	1	361	101	Squad
(France) 2007	Quarter-finals	5	4	0	1	327	55	Squad
(New Zealand) 2011	Champions	7	7	0	0	301	72	Squad
(England) 2015	Champions	7	7	0	0	290	97	Squad
(Japan) 2019	Third place	7	5	1	1	250	72	Squad
(France) 2023	Runners-up	7	5	0	2	336	89	Squad
(Australia) 2027	Qualified							
(United States) 2031	To be determined							
Total	—	64	54	1	9	2888	842	—
Champions; Runners–up; Third place; Fourth place; Home venue

During Typhoon Hagibis; New Zealand v Italy was to be cancelled and recorded as 0–0 draw

== 1987 Rugby World Cup ==
Team	Pld	W	D	L	PF	PA	PD	T	Pts	Qualification
New Zealand	3	3	0	0	190	34	+156	30	6	Knockout stage
Fiji	3	1	0	2	56	101	−45	6	2 (Note: Fiji qualified for the highest number of tries (Fiji 6, Italy 5, Argentina 4))	Knockout stage
Italy	3	1	0	2	40	110	−70	5	2	
Argentina	3	1	0	2	49	90	−41	4	2	

Notes:

22 May 1987

New Zealand	70–6	Italy
Try: Kirwan (2); Kirk (2); Green (2); Penalty try Jones; Taylor; McDowell; Stanley; Whetton; Con: Fox (8); Pen: Fox (2)	Report	Pen: Collodo; Drop: Collodo

Eden Park, Auckland
Attendance: 20,000
Referee: Bob Fordham (Australia)

27 May 1987

New Zealand	74–13	Fiji
Try: Gallagher (4); Green (4); Kirk; Kirwan; Penalty try Whetton; Con: Fox (10); Pen: Fox (2)	Report	Try: Cama; Pen: Koroduadua (3)

Lancaster Park, Christchurch
Attendance: 25,000
Referee: Derek Bevan (Wales)

1 June 1987

New Zealand	46–15	Argentina
Try: Kirk; Brooke; Stanley; Earl; Crowley; Whetton; Con: Fox (2); Pen: Fox (6)		Try: Lanza; Con: Porta; Pen: Porta (3)

Athletic Park, Wellington
Attendance: 30,000
Referee: Roger Quittenton (England)

=== Knockout stage ===
6 June 1987

New Zealand	30–3	Scotland
Tries: Whetton, Gallagher; Con: Fox (2); Pen: Fox (6)	Report	Pen: Hastings

Lancaster Park, Christchurch
Attendance: 40,000
Referee: David Burnett (Ireland)

14 June 1987

New Zealand	49–6	Wales
Tries: Kirwan (2), Shelford (2), Drake, Whetton, Stanley, Brooke-Cowden; Con: Fox (7); Pen: Fox	Report	Tries: Devereux; Con: Thorburn

Ballymore, Brisbane
Attendance: 22,576
Referee: Kerry Fitzgerald (Australia)

20 June 1987

New Zealand	29–9	France
Tries: Jones, Kirk, Kirwan; Con: Fox; Pen: Fox (4); Drop: Fox	Report	Tries: Berbizier; Con: Camberabero; Pen: Camberabero

Eden Park, Auckland
Attendance: 46,000
Referee: Kerry Fitzgerald (Australia)

== 1991 Rugby World Cup ==
3 October 1991

England	12–18	New Zealand
Pen: Webb (3); Drop: Andrew	Report	Tries: Jones; Con: Fox; Pen: Fox (4)

Twickenham, London
Attendance: 70,000
Referee: Jim Fleming (Scotland)

8 October 1991

New Zealand	46–6	United States
Tries: Wright (3), Earl, Purvis, Timu, Tuigamala, Innes; Con: Preston (4); Pen: Preston (2)	Report	Pen: Williams (2)

Kingsholm, Gloucester
Attendance: 12,000
Referee: Efraim Sklar (Argentina)

19 October 1991

Italy	21–31	New Zealand
Tries: Cuttitta, Bonomi; Con: Dominguez (2); Pen: Dominguez (3)	Report	Tries: Brooke, Innes, Tuigamala, Hewett; Con: Fox (3); Pen: Fox (3)

Welford Road, Leicester
Attendance: 16,800
Referee: Kerry Fitzgerald (Australia)

Team	Pld	W	D	L	PF	PA	PD	Pts
New Zealand	3	3	0	0	95	39	+56	6
England	3	2	0	1	85	33	+52	4
Italy	3	1	0	2	57	76	−19	2
United States	3	0	0	3	24	113	−89	0

=== Knockout stage ===
20 October 1991

Canada	13–29	New Zealand
Tries: Tynan, Charron; Con: Rees; Pen: Wyatt	Report	Tries: Timu (2), McCahill, Brooke, Kirwan; Con: Fox (3); Pen: Fox

Stadium Lille-Metropole, Villeneuve d'Ascq
Referee: Fred Howard (England)

27 October 1991

Australia	16–6	New Zealand
Tries: Campese, Horan; Con: Lynagh; Pen: Lynagh (2)	Report	Pen: Fox (2)

Lansdowne Road, Dublin
Referee: Jim Fleming (Scotland)

30 October 1991

New Zealand	13–6	Scotland
Tries: Little; Pen: Preston (3)	Report	Pen: G. Hastings (2)

Cardiff Arms Park, Cardiff
Referee: Stephen Hilditch (Ireland)

== 1995 Rugby World Cup ==
27 May 1995

Ireland	19–43	New Zealand
Tries: Corkery, McBride, Halpin; Con: Elwood (2)	Report	Tries: Lomu (2), Kronfeld, Bunce, Osborne; Con: Mehrtens (3); Pen: Mehrtens (4)

Ellis Park, Johannesburg
Attendance: 38,000
Referee: Wayne Erickson (Australia)

31 May 1995

New Zealand	34–9	Wales
Tries: Ellis, Little, Kronfeld; Con: Mehrtens (2); Pen: Mehrtens (4); Drop: Mehrtens	Report	Pen: Jenkins (2); Drop: Jenkins

Ellis Park, Johannesburg
Attendance: 38,000
Referee: Ed Morrison (England)

4 June 1995

Japan	17–145	New Zealand
Tries: Kajihara (2); Con: Hirose (2); Pen: Hirose	Report	Tries: Ellis (6), Rush (3), Wilson (3), R. Brooke (2), Osborne (2), Loe, Culhane, Henderson, Dowd, Ieremia; Con: Culhane (20)

Free State Stadium, Bloemfontein
Attendance: 17,000
Referee: George Gadjovic (Canada)

Team	Pld	W	D	L	PF	PA	PD	Pts
New Zealand	3	3	0	0	222	45	+177	9
Ireland	3	2	0	1	93	94	−1	7
Wales	3	1	0	2	89	68	+21	5
Japan	3	0	0	3	55	252	−197	3

=== Knockout stage ===
11 June 1995

New Zealand	48–30	Scotland
Tries: Little (2), Lomu, Mehrtens, Bunce, Fitzpatrick; Con: Mehrtens (6); Pen: Mehrtens (2)	Report	Tries: Weir (2), S. Hastings; Con: G. Hastings (3); Pen: G. Hastings (3)

Loftus Versfeld, Pretoria
Attendance: 20,000
Referee: Derek Bevan (Wales)

18 June 1995

England	29–45	New Zealand
Tries: Carling (2), R. Underwood; Con: Andrew (3); Pen: Andrew	Report	Tries: Lomu (4), Kronfeld, Bachop; Con: Mehrtens (3); Pen: Mehrtens; Drop: Z. Brooke, Mehrtens

Newlands, Cape Town
Attendance: 50,000
Referee: Stephen Hilditch (Ireland)

24 June 1995

South Africa	15–12 (a.e.t.)	New Zealand
Pen: Stransky (3); Drop: Stransky (2)	Report	Pen: Mehrtens (3); Drop: Mehrtens

Ellis Park, Johannesburg
Attendance: 65,000
Referee: Ed Morrison (England)

== 1999 Rugby World Cup ==
3 October 1999

New Zealand	45–9	Tonga
Tries: Jonah Lomu (2), Byron Kelleher, Norm Maxwell, Josh Kronfeld; Con: Andrew Mehrtens (4); Pen: Andrew Mehrtens (4)	Report	Pen: Siua Taumalolo (3)

Ashton Gate, Bristol
Attendance: 21,000
Referee: Derek Bevan (Wales)

9 October 1999

England	16–30	New Zealand
Tries: Phil de Glanville; Con: Jonny Wilkinson; Pen: Jonny Wilkinson (3)	Report	Tries: Byron Kelleher, Jeff Wilson, Jonah Lomu; Con: Andrew Mehrtens (3); Pen: Andrew Mehrtens (3)

Twickenham, London
Attendance: 74,600
Referee: Peter Marshall (Australia)

14 October 1999

New Zealand	101–3	Italy
Tries: Jeff Wilson (3), Glen Osborne (2), Jonah Lomu (2), Taine Randell, Tony Brown, Christian Cullen, Mark Hammett, Daryl Gibson, Scott Robertson, Dylan Mika; Con: Tony Brown (11); Pen: Tony Brown (3)	Report	Pen: Diego Dominguez

McAlpine Stadium, Huddersfield
Attendance: 22,032
Referee: Jim Fleming (Scotland)

Team	Pld	W	D	L	PF	PA	PD	Pts
New Zealand	3	3	0	0	176	28	+148	9
England	3	2	0	1	184	47	+137	7
Tonga	3	1	0	2	47	171	−124	5
Italy	3	0	0	3	35	196	−161	3

=== Knockout stage ===
24 October 1999

New Zealand	30–18	Scotland
Tries: Tana Umaga (2); Jeff Wilson, Jonah Lomu; Con: Andrew Mehrtens (2); Pen: Andrew Mehrtens (2)	Report	Tries: Cameron Murray, Budge Pountney; Con: Kenny Logan; Pen: Kenny Logan; Drop: Gregor Townsend

Murrayfield, Edinburgh
Attendance: 67,529
Referee: Ed Morrison (England)

31 October 1999

New Zealand	31–43	France
Tries: Jonah Lomu (2), Jeff Wilson; Con: Andrew Mehrtens (2); Pen: Andrew Mehrtens (4)	Report	Tries:Christophe Lamaison, Christophe Dominici, Richard Dourthe, Philippe Bernat-Salles; Con: Christophe Lamaison (4); Pen: Christophe Lamaison (3); Drop: Christophe Lamaison (2)

Twickenham, London
Attendance: 75,000
Referee: Jim Flemming (Scotland)

4 November 1999

South Africa	22–18	New Zealand
Tries: Breyton Paulse; Con: Henry Honiball; Pen: Henry Honiball (3); Drop goals: Percy Montgomery (2)	Report	Pen: Andrew Mehrtens (6)

Millennium Stadium, Cardiff
Attendance: 74,500
Referee: Peter Marshall (Australia)

== 2003 Rugby World Cup ==
11 October 2003

New Zealand	70–7	Italy
Tries: B. Thorn, R. Thorne, Howlett (2), Spencer (2), Rokocoko (2), Marshall, Carter, MacDonald; Con: Carter (6); Pen: Spencer	Report	Tries: Phillips; Con: Peens

Telstra Dome, Melbourne
Attendance: 41,715
Referee: Andrew Cole (Australia)

17 October 2003

New Zealand	68–6	Canada
Tries: Ralph (2), So'oialo (2), Muliaina (4), Meeuws, Nonu; Con: Carter (9)	Report	Pen: Barker (2)

Telstra Dome, Melbourne
Attendance: 38,899
Referee: Tony Spreadbury (England)

24 October 2003

New Zealand	91–7	Tonga
Tries: Braid, Carter, Flynn, Ralph (2), Spencer, Meeuws, Penalty try, Muliaina (2), MacDonald, Howlett (2); Con: MacDonald (12), Spencer	Report	Tries: Hola; Con: Tu'ipulotu

Suncorp Stadium, Brisbane
Attendance: 47,588
Referee: Pablo De Luca (Argentina)

2 November 2003

New Zealand	53–37	Wales
Tries: Rokocoko (2), MacDonald, Williams, Howlett (2), Spencer, Mauger; Con: MacDonald (5); Pen: MacDonald	Report	Tries: Taylor, Parker, Charvis, S. Williams; Con: S. Jones (4); Pen: S. Jones (3)

Telstra Stadium, Sydney
Attendance: 80,012
Referee: André Watson (South Africa)

Team	Pld	W	D	L	PF	PA	PD	BP	Pts	Qualification
New Zealand	4	4	0	0	282	57	+225	4	20	Quarter-finals
Wales	4	3	0	1	132	98	+34	2	14	Quarter-finals
Italy	4	2	0	2	77	123	−46	0	8	
Canada	4	1	0	3	54	135	−81	1	5	
Tonga	4	0	0	4	46	178	−132	1	1	

=== Knockout stage ===
8 November 2003

New Zealand	29–9	South Africa
Tries: MacDonald 16' c Mealamu 59' m Rokocoko 72' m Con: MacDonald; Pen: MacDonald (3); Drop: Mauger 45'	Report	Pen: Hougaard (3)

Telstra Dome, Melbourne
Attendance: 40,734
Referee: Tony Spreadbury (England)

15 November 2003

New Zealand	10–22	Australia
Try: Thorne 35' c Con: MacDonald; Pen: MacDonald	Report	Try: Mortlock 9' c Con: Flatley; Pen: Flatley (5)

Telstra Stadium, Sydney
Attendance: 82,444
Referee: Chris White (England)

20 November 2003

New Zealand	40–13	France
Tries: Jack 12' c Howlett 20' c Rokocoko 51' c Thorn 54' c Muliaina 58' c Holah m Con: MacDonald; Carter (4)	Report	Try: Elhorga 42' c Con: Yachvili; Pen: Yachvili; Drop: Yachvili

Telstra Stadium, Sydney
Attendance: 62,712
Referee: Chris White (England)

== 2007 Rugby World Cup ==
Pos	Team	Pld	W	D	L	PF	PA	PD	B	Pts	Qualification
1	New Zealand	4	4	0	0	309	35	+274	4	20	Qualified for the quarter-finals
2	Scotland	4	3	0	1	116	66	+50	2	14	Qualified for the quarter-finals
3	Italy	4	2	0	2	85	117	−32	1	9	Eliminated, automatic qualification for RWC 2011
4	Romania	4	1	0	3	40	161	−121	1	5	
5	Portugal	4	0	0	4	38	209	−171	1	1	

8 September 2007
13:45

New Zealand	76–14	Italy
Tries: McCaw (2) 2' c, 7' c Howlett (3) 12' c, 56' c, 59' m Muliaina 15' c Sivivatu (2) 18' c, 29' m Jack 50' c Collins (2) 68' c, 70' c Con: Carter (7/9); McAlister (2/2); Pen: Carter (1/1)	Report	Tries: Stanojevic 38' c Mi. Bergamasco 71' c Con: Bortolussi (1/1) de Marigny (1/1)

Stade Vélodrome, Marseille
Attendance: 58,612
Referee: Wayne Barnes (England)

15 September 2007
13:00

New Zealand	108–13	Portugal
Tries: Rokocoko (2) 3' m, 12' c Toeava 25' c Williams 28' c Mauger (2) 30' c, 66' c Collins 32' c Masoe 34' m Hore 40' c Leonard 50' c Evans 59' c Ellis 61' c MacDonald 69' c Smith (2) 72' c, 79' c Hayman 76' c Con: Evans (14/16)	Report	Try: Cordeiro 48' c Con: D. Pinto (1/1); Pen: D. Pinto (1/1) 75'; Drop: Gonçalo Malheiro (1/2) 22'

Stade de Gerland, Lyon
Attendance: 40,729
Referee: Chris White (England)

23 September 2007
17:00

Scotland	0–40	New Zealand
	Report	Tries: McCaw 5' c Howlett (2) 15' c, 74' c Kelleher 33' c Williams 62' c Carter 65' c Con: Carter (2/5); Pen: Carter (2/3) 26', 43'

Murrayfield Stadium, Edinburgh
Attendance: 64,558
Referee: Marius Jonker (South Africa)

29 September 2007
13:00

New Zealand	85–8	Romania
Tries: Sivivatu (2) 1' m, 24' c Masoe 10' c Rokocoko (3) 15' c, 58' c, 66' c Evans 18' m Mauger 37' m Toeava (2) 47' c, 80+' c Hore 64' c Smith 75' c Howlett 79' c Con: McAlister (4/7); Evans (6/6)	Report	Try: Țincu 31' m Pen: Vlaicu 72'

Stadium de Toulouse, Toulouse
Attendance: 35,608
Referee: Joël Jutge (France)

=== Knockout stage ===
Quarter-final

6 October 2007
21:00

New Zealand	18–20	France
Tries: McAlister 17' c So'oialo 63' m Con: Carter (1/1); Pen: Carter (2/2) 14', 31'	Report	Tries: Dusautoir 54' c Jauzion 69' c Con: Beauxis (1/1); Élissalde (1/1); Pen: Beauxis (2/3) 40+', 46'

Millennium Stadium, Cardiff
Attendance: 71,669
Referee: Wayne Barnes (England)

== 2011 Rugby World Cup ==
9 September 2011
21:00

New Zealand	41–10	Tonga
Tries: Dagg 10', 22'; Kahui 19', 33'; Kaino 58'; Nonu 74'; Con: Carter (3/5); Slade (1/1); Pen: Carter (1/1) 4'	Report	Tries: Taumalolo 73' c Con: Morath (1/1); Pen: Morath (1/1) 40+'

Eden Park, Auckland
Attendance: 60,000
Referee: George Clancy (Ireland)

16 September 2011
20:00

New Zealand	83–7	Japan
Tries: Smith 4', Kahui 16', 45'; Kaino 21'; Mealamu 30'; Ellis 34'; Slade 36'; Con: Slade (9/13)	Report	Tries: Onozawa 58' c Con: M. Williams (1/1)

Waikato Stadium, Hamilton
Attendance: 30,484
Referee: Nigel Owens (Wales)

24 September 2011
20:30

New Zealand
Tries: Thomson 10',
Jane 17',
Dagg (2) 21', 41'
Williams 77'
Con: Carter (3/5) 18', 21', 42'
Pen: Carter (1/1) 47' Drop: Carter
37–17
Report
France
Tries: Mermoz 54',
Trinh-Duc 75'

Con: Yachvili (2/2) 55', 75'

Pen: Yachvili (1/1) 39'

Eden Park, Auckland
Attendance: 60,000
Referee: Alain Rolland (Ireland)

2 October 2011
15:30

New Zealand	79–15	Canada
Tries: Guildford (4) 7', 24', 35', 76', Vito (2) 11', 80', Dagg 20', Muliaina 29', Cowan 44', Kaino (2) 51', 67', Williams 59'; Con: Slade (4) 8', 30', 45', 52'; Weepu (4) 61', 68', 78', 80'; Pen: Slade (1/1) 15'	Report	Tries: Trainor (2) 40', 42'; Pen: Monro (1/1) 2'

Westpac Stadium, Wellington
Attendance: 60,000
Referee: Romain Poite (France)

Pos	Team	Pld	W	D	L	PF	PA	PD	T	B	Pts	Qualification
1	New Zealand	4	4	0	0	240	49	+191	36	4	20	Advanced to the quarter-finals and qualified for the 2015 Rugby World Cup
2	France	4	2	0	2	124	96	+28	13	3	11	Advanced to the quarter-finals and qualified for the 2015 Rugby World Cup
3	Tonga	4	2	0	2	80	98	−18	7	1	9	Eliminated but qualified for 2015 Rugby World Cup
4	Canada	4	1	1	2	82	168	−86	9	0	6	
5	Japan	4	0	1	3	69	184	−115	8	0	2	

=== Knockout stage ===
Quarter-final

9 October 2011
20:30

New Zealand	33–10	Argentina
Tries: Read 10', 22'; Thorn 77', Con: Weepu (1/2) 77' Pen: Weepu (7/8) 13', 26', 36', 40', 50', 59', 73'	Report	Tries: Cabello 31' c Con: Contepomi (1/1); Pen: Bosch (1/1) 46'

Eden Park, Auckland
Attendance: 60,000
Referee: Nigel Owens (Wales)

Semi-final

16 October 2011
20:30

New Zealand	20–6	Australia
Tries: Nonu; Pen: Weepu; Drop: Cruden	Report	Pen: O'Connor; Drop: Cooper

Eden Park, Auckland
Referee: Craig Joubert (South Africa)

Final

23 October 2011
20:30

New Zealand	8–7	France
Tries: Woodcock; Pen: Donald	Report	Tries: Dusautoir; Con: Trinh-Duc

Eden Park, Auckland
Referee: Craig Joubert (South Africa)

== 2015 Rugby World Cup ==
20 September 2015
16:45

New Zealand	26–16	Argentina
Tries: A. Smith 57' c Cane 67' c Con: Carter (2/2) 58', 67'; Pen: Carter (4/4) 5', 11', 19', 40'	Report	Tries: Petti 21' c Con: Sánchez (1/1) 23'; Pen: Sánchez (3/3) 30', 38', 43'

Wembley Stadium, London
Attendance: 89,019
Referee: Wayne Barnes (England)

24 September 2015
20:00

New Zealand	58–14	Namibia
Tries: Vito 6' c Milner-Skudder (2) 10' m, 40' m Fekitoa 21' c Barrett 31' c Savea (2) 47' c, 75' m Smith 61' m Taylor 79' c Con: Barrett (4/8) 7', 21', 32', 80'; Slade (1/1) 48'; Pen: Barrett (1/1) 5'	Report	Tries: Deysel 51' m Con: Kotzé (0/1); Pen: Kotzé (3/3) 14', 23', 44'

Olympic Stadium, London
Attendance: 51,820
Referee: Romain Poite (France)

2 October 2015
20:00

New Zealand	43–10	Georgia
Tries: Naholo 2' c Savea (3) 8' m, 17' m, 74' c Coles 22' m Read 52' c Fekitoa 77' c Con: Carter (4/7) 3', 53', 75', 78'	Report	Tries: Tsiklauri 5' c Con: Malaghuradze (1/1) 6'; Pen: Malaghuradze (1/1) 12'

Millennium Stadium, Cardiff
Attendance: 69,187
Referee: Pascal Gaüzère (France)

9 October 2015
20:00

New Zealand	47–9	Tonga
Tries: B. Smith 13' c Woodcock 31' c Milner-Skudder (2) 52' c, 58' c Williams 66' c Cane 70' c Nonu 76' m Con: Carter (6/7) 15', 32', 54', 59', 66', 72'	Report	Pen: Morath (3/3) 26', 49', 57'

St. James' Park, Newcastle
Attendance: 50,985
Referee: John Lacey (Ireland)

Pos	Team	Pld	W	D	L	PF	PA	PD	T	B	Pts	Qualification
1	New Zealand	4	4	0	0	174	49	+125	25	3	19	Advanced to the quarter-finals and qualified for the 2019 Rugby World Cup
2	Argentina	4	3	0	1	179	70	+109	22	3	15	Advanced to the quarter-finals and qualified for the 2019 Rugby World Cup
3	Georgia	4	2	0	2	53	123	−70	5	0	8	Eliminated but qualified for 2019 Rugby World Cup
4	Tonga	4	1	0	3	70	130	−60	8	2	6	
5	Namibia	4	0	0	4	70	174	−104	8	1	1	

=== Knockout stage ===
Quarter-final

17 October 2015
20:00

New Zealand	62–13	France
Tries: Retallick 11' c Milner-Skudder 23' c Savea (3) 29' c, 38' m, 59' c Kaino 50' m Read 64' c Kerr-Barlow (2) 68' c, 71' c Con: Carter (7/9) 12', 25', 31', 60', 65', 68', 72'; Pen: Carter (1/1) 7'	Report	Tries: Picamoles 36' c Con: Parra (1/1) 37'; Pen: Spedding (1/1) 9'; Parra (1/2) 15'

Millennium Stadium, Cardiff
Attendance: 71,619
Referee: Nigel Owens (Wales)

Semi-final

24 October 2015
16:00

South Africa	18–20	New Zealand
Pen: Pollard (5/5) 3', 11', 21', 39', 58'; Lambie (1/1) 69'	Report	Tries: Kaino 6' c Barrett 52' c Con: Carter (2/2) 9', 53'; Pen: Carter (1/2) 60'; Drop: Carter 46'

Twickenham Stadium, London
Attendance: 80,090
Referee: Jérôme Garcès (France)

Final

31 October 2015
16:00

New Zealand	34–17	Australia
Tries: Milner-Skudder 39' c Nonu 42' m Barrett 79' c Con: Carter (2/3) 40', 80'; Pen: Carter (4/4) 8', 27', 36', 75'; Drop: Carter 70'	Report	Tries: Pocock 53' c Kuridrani 64' c Con: Foley (2/2) 54', 65'; Pen: Foley (1/1) 14'

Twickenham Stadium, London
Attendance: 80,125
Referee: Nigel Owens (Wales)

== 2019 Rugby World Cup ==
Pos	Team	Pld	W	D	L	PF	PA	PD	T	B	Pts	Qualification
1	New Zealand	4	3	1	0	157	22	+135	22	2	16	Advanced to the quarter-finals and qualified for the 2023 Rugby World Cup
2	South Africa	4	3	0	1	185	36	+149	27	3	15	Advanced to the quarter-finals and qualified for the 2023 Rugby World Cup
3	Italy	4	2	1	1	98	78	+20	14	2	12	Eliminated but qualified for 2023 Rugby World Cup
4	Namibia	4	0	1	3	34	175	−141	3	0	2	
5	Canada	4	0	1	3	14	177	−163	2	0	2	

21 September 2019
18:45 JST (UTC+09)

New Zealand	23–13	South Africa
Try: Bridge 24' c S. Barrett 27' c Con: Mo'unga (2/2) 25', 28'; Pen: Mo'unga (2/3) 23', 67'; B. Barrett (1/1) 72'	Report	Try: Du Toit 48' c Con: Pollard (1/1) 49'; Pen: Pollard (1/2) 2'; Drop: Pollard (1/1) 59'

International Stadium Yokohama, Yokohama
Attendance: 63,649
Referee: Jérôme Garcès (France)

2 October 2019
19:15 JST (UTC+09)

(1 BP) New Zealand	63–0	Canada
Try: Penalty try 5'; J. Barrett 9' c Williams 17' c B. Barrett 36' c Ioane 41' c S. Barrett 45' c Frizell 47' c Weber (2) 50' c, 57' c Con: Mo'unga (8/8) 10', 19', 37', 43', 46', 49', 51', 59'	Report

Oita Stadium, Ōita
Attendance: 34,411
Referee: Romain Poite (France)

6 October 2019
13:45 JST (UTC+09)

(1 BP) New Zealand	71–9	Namibia
Try: Reece (2) 6' m, 53' c Lienert-Brown (2) 21' m, 47' c Ta'avao 36' c B. Smith (2) 40+5' c, 68' c Moody 42' m Whitelock 56' c J. Barrett 76' c Perenara 79' m Con: J. Barrett (8/11) 37', 40+6', 44', 48', 53', 57', 69', 77'	Report	Pen: Stevens (3/3) 3', 26', 30'

Tokyo Stadium, Chōfu
Attendance: 48,354
Referee: Pascal Gaüzère (France)

12 October 2019
13:45 JST (UTC+09)

New Zealand	0–0 (Cancelled)	Italy

City of Toyota Stadium, Toyota
Referee: Luke Pearce (England)

Notes:

- As a result of inclement weather caused by Typhoon Hagibis this match was cancelled and awarded as a 0–0 draw.

=== Knockout stage ===
Quarter-final

19 October 2019
19:15 JST (UTC+09)

New Zealand	46–14	Ireland
Try: A. Smith (2) 14' c, 20' c B. Barrett 32'; Taylor 48' c Bridge 73' c J. Barrett 79'; Con: Mo'unga (4/7) 15', 22', 49', 74'; Pen: Mo'unga (1/1) 6'; Drop: B. Barrett (0/1)	Report	Try: Henshaw 69'; Penalty try 76'; Con: Carbery (1/1) 69'

Tokyo Stadium, Chōfu
Referee: Nigel Owens (Wales)

Semi-final

26 October 2019
17:00 JST (UTC+09)

England	19-7	New Zealand
Try: Tuilagi 2' c Con: Farrell (1/1) 3'; Pen: Ford (4/5) 40', 50', 63', 69'		Try: Savea 57' c Con: Mo'unga (1/1) 58'

International Stadium Yokohama, Yokohama
Referee: Nigel Owens (Wales)

Bronze final

1 November 2019
18:00 JST (UTC+09)

New Zealand	40–17	Wales
Try: Moody 5' c B. Barrett 13' c B. Smith (2) 33' c, 40+1' c Crotty 42' c Mo'unga 76' m Con: Mo'unga (5/6) 7', 14', 34', 40+2', 44'	Report	Try: Amos 19' c Adams 59' c Con: Patchell (1/1) 21'; Biggar (1/1) 61'; Pen: Patchell (1/1) 27'

Tokyo Stadium, Chōfu
Attendance: 48,842
Referee: Wayne Barnes (England)

== 2023 Rugby World Cup ==
Pos	Team	Pld	W	D	L	PF	PA	PD	TF	TA	B	Pts	Qualification
1	France (H)	4	4	0	0	210	32	+178	27	5	2	18	Advance to knockout stage, and qualification to the 2027 Men's Rugby World Cup
2	New Zealand	4	3	0	1	253	47	+206	38	4	3	15	Advance to knockout stage, and qualification to the 2027 Men's Rugby World Cup
3	Italy	4	2	0	2	114	181	−67	15	25	2	10	Qualification to the 2027 Men's Rugby World Cup
4	Uruguay	4	1	0	3	65	164	−99	9	21	1	5	
5	Namibia	4	0	0	4	37	255	−218	3	37	0	0	

Source: World Rugby
Rules for classification: Pool stage tiebreakers
(H) Host

8 September 2023
21:15 CEST (UTC+2)

France	27–13	New Zealand
Try: Penaud 55' c Jaminet 78' m Con: Ramos (1/1) 57'; Pen: Ramos (5/7) 5', 20', 29', 65', 74'	Report	Try: Tele'a (2) 2' m, 43' m Pen: Mo'unga (1/1) 25'

Stade de France, Saint-Denis
Attendance: 78,680
Referee: Jaco Peyper (South Africa)

15 September 2023
21:00 CEST (UTC+2)

(1 BP) New Zealand	71–3	Namibia
Try: Roigard (2) 2' c, 7' m McKenzie (2) 20' c, 39' c Fainga'anuku 25' m Lienert-Brown 35' c De Groot 49' m Papalii 55' c Havili 58' c Clarke 67' c Ioane 77' c Con: McKenzie (8/11) 3', 20', 36', 40', 55', 59', 68', 78'	Report	Pen: Swanepoel (1/1) 11'

Stadium de Toulouse, Toulouse
Attendance: 31,996
Referee: Luke Pearce (England)

29 September 2023
21:00 CEST (UTC+2)

(1 BP) New Zealand	96–17	Italy
Try: Jordan (2) 7' c, 70' c Smith (3) 17' c, 27' c, 34' c Tele'a 19' c Savea (2) 22' c, 40+5' c Retallick 50' c Papalii 55' c Coles (2) 61' m, 73' c McKenzie 67' c Lienert-Brown 76' c Con: Mo'unga (9/10) 8', 18', 20, 23', 28', 35', 40+6', 51', 57'; McKenzie (4/4) 69', 71', 74', 77'	Report	Try: Capuozzo 48' c Ioane 80+1' c Con: Allan (1/1) 49'; P. Garbisi (1/1) 80+3'; Pen: Allan (1/1) 10'

Parc Olympique Lyonnais, Décines-Charpieu
Attendance: 57,083
Referee: Matthew Carley (England)

5 October 2023
21:00 CEST (UTC+2)

(1 BP) New Zealand	73–0	Uruguay
Try: McKenzie (2) 20' c, 53' c Mo'unga 25' c Jordan (2) 33' c, 65' c Roigard 38' m Newell 45' m Fainga'anuku (3) 49' c, 68' c, 77' c Williams 73' c Con: Mo'unga (5/7) 21', 26', 34', 50', 54'; McKenzie (2/2) 66', 69'; B. Barrett (2/2) 74', 78'	Report

Parc Olympique Lyonnais, Décines-Charpieu
Attendance: 57,672
Referee: Wayne Barnes (England)

=== Knockout stage ===
Quarter-final

14 October 2023
21:00 CEST (UTC+2)

Ireland	24–28	New Zealand
Try: Aki 27' c Gibson-Park 39' c Penalty try 64'; Con: Sexton (2/2) 29', 40'; Pen: Sexton (1/2) 22'	Report	Try: Fainga'anuku 19' c Savea 33' m Jordan 53' c Con: Mo'unga (1/2) 21'; J. Barrett (1/1) 54'; Pen: Mo'unga (1/1) 8'; J. Barrett (2/3) 14', 69'

Stade de France, Saint-Denis
Attendance: 78,845
Referee: Wayne Barnes (England)

Semi-final

20 October 2023
21:00 CEST (UTC+2)

Argentina	6–44	New Zealand
Pen: Boffelli (2/2) 5', 35'	Report	Try: Jordan (3) 11' c, 62' m, 73' m J. Barrett 17' m Frizell (2) 40+2' m, 49' c Smith 42' c Con: Mo'unga (3/7) 12', 43', 50'; Pen: Mo'unga (1/1) 38'

Stade de France, Saint-Denis
Attendance: 77,653
Referee: Angus Gardner (Australia)

Final

28 October 2023
21:00 CEST (UTC+2)

New Zealand	11–12	South Africa
Try: B. Barrett 58' m Pen: Mo'unga (2/2) 17', 38'	Report	Pen: Pollard (4/4) 3', 13', 19', 34'

Stade de France, Saint-Denis
Attendance: 80,065
Referee: Wayne Barnes (England)

== Overall record ==
Overall record against all nations in the World Cup:

Country	Played	Wins	Draws	Losses	For	Against	+/-	Winning percent
France	8	5	—	3	238	151	+87	62.5
Italy	7	6	1	—	444	68	+376	83
Scotland	5	5	—	—	161	57	+104	100
South Africa	6	3	—	3	113	89	+24	50
Argentina	4	4	—	—	149	47	+102	100
Canada	4	4	—	—	239	34	+205	100
Tonga	4	4	—	—	224	35	+189	100
Wales	4	4	—	—	176	69	+107	100
England	4	3	—	1	100	76	+24	75
Australia	4	2	—	2	70	61	+9	50
Ireland	3	3	—	—	117	57	+60	100
Namibia	3	3	—	—	200	26	+174	100
Japan	2	2	—	—	228	24	+204	100
Fiji	1	1	—	—	74	13	+61	100
Georgia	1	1	—	—	43	10	+33	100
Portugal	1	1	—	—	108	13	+95	100
Romania	1	1	—	—	85	8	+77	100
Uruguay	1	1	—	-	73	0	+73	100
United States	1	1	—	—	46	6	+40	100
Total	64	54	1	9	2,888	844	+2,041	84.38

== See also ==
• New Zealand women at the Rugby World Cup
