= New Zealand national schoolboy rugby union team =

New Zealand Schools
- Nickname: Baby Blacks
- Coach: Paul Tito
- Captain: Logan Platt
- Most caps: Joe Rokocoko(11)
- Top scorer: Doug Howlett
Team kit	Change kit

The New Zealand Schools rugby union team, commonly referred to as the New Zealand schoolboys rugby team, is composed of secondary school students in New Zealand.

In 1980 the New Zealand schoolboys rugby team had their first overseas tour, to Australia.

Many of the players have gone on to play for professional clubs or provinces or for the All Blacks or other international teams.

== Recent squads ==
=== 2023 ===
On 27 September 2023 a New Zealand Schools team was named for the two matches against the Australia U18 team in Canberra, Australia:

1. Tonga Helu (Sacred Heart College)
2. Manumaua Letiu (Christchurch Boys' High School)
3. Logan Wallace (Palmerston North Boys' High School)
4. Josh Tengblad (Sacred Heart College)
5. Aisake Vakasiuola (Tauranga Boys’ College)
6. Quinten Holland (King's High School)
7. Oli Mathis (Hamilton Boys’ High School) (captain)
8. Mosese Bason (Feilding High School)
9. Dylan Pledger (King's High School)
10. Rico Simpson (Sacred Heart College)
11. Kiseki Fifita (Southland Boys' High School)
12. Caelys-Paul Putoko (Hamilton Boys’ High School)
13. James Cameron (Westlake Boys' High School) (vice captain)
14. Tevita Naufahu (St Kentigern College)
15. Isaac Murray-Macgregor (Westlake Boys' High School)

Also named were Shaun Kempton (Rolleston College/Selwyn Combined), Raharuhi Palmer (Hamilton Boys’ High School), Sione Mafi (Nelson College), Robson Faleafa (St Peter's College Auckland), Jake Frost (Christchurch Boys' High School), Micah Fale (St John's Hamilton), Tayne Harvey (Palmerston North Boys' High School), Charlie Sinton (Tauranga Boys’ College), Rangiwai Lunjevich (Hamilton Boys’ High School), Frank Vaenuku (De La Salle College), Marshall Blakely (Christchurch Boys' High School)

Head Coach: Kane Jury Assistant Coaches: Ngatai Walker and James Hantz

=== 2022 ===
- Vernon Bason (Feilding High School)
- Dylan Pledger (King's High School)
- Payton Spencer (Hamilton Boys' High School)

=== 2020 and 2021 ===
Due to COVID-19, teams were selected but did not play. They included:

==== 2021 ====
- Vernon Bason (Feilding High School)
- Jordi Viljoen (Hastings Boys' High School)
- Payton Spencer (Hamilton Boys' High School)

==== 2020 ====
- Fabian Holland (Christchurch Boys' High School)
- Noah Hotham (Hamilton Boys' High School)

=== 2019 ===
The 2019 team was:

- Forwards: Cam Church, Allan Craig, Vaiolini Ekuasi, Zach Gallagher, Dominic Gardiner, Vincent Green, Finau Halafihi, Corey Kellow, Ben Lopas, Te Rama Reuben, Anton Segner, Jack Sexton, Ben Strang, Tiaan Tauakipulu
- Backs: Meihana Grindlay, Will Gualter, Max Hughes, Ollie Lewis, Ruben Love, Jacob Ratumaitavuki-Kneepkens, Aidan Morgan, Blair Murray, Manu Paea, Roderick Solo, Gideon Wrampling.

== Notable past players ==
Year	Player	School	All Blacks	Other teams
2001-2002	John Afoa	Saint Kentigern College	2005-2011	Auckland, Blues, Junior All Blacks, Ulster, Gloucester, Bristol Bears
1993	Pita Alatini	King's College, Auckland	1999-2001	Counties-Manukau, Southland, Otago, Wellington, Crusaders, Chiefs, Highlanders, Hurricanes, Suntory Sungoliath
2009	Gareth Anscombe	Rosmini College	-	Blues, Chiefs, Cardiff Blues, Ospreys, Wales
2015	Asafo Aumua	St Patrick's College, Silverstream	2017-2021	Wellington, Hurricanes
2000, 2002	Ben Atiga	Auckland Grammar School	2003	Auckland, Blues, Junior All Blacks, Otago, Edinburgh
1983,84	Stephen Bachop	Hagley High School	1992	Canterbury, Manu Samoa
1980	Mark Benton	Te Aute College	-	Wairarapa Bush, New Zealand Emerging Players
1986 (Cpt)	Errol Brain	Tikipunga High School	-	Counties-Manukau, Blues, Chiefs, New Zealand Maori
1984	Robin Brooke	Mahurangi College	1992-1999	Auckland, Blues, New Zealand Maori
1985	Olo Brown	Mount Albert Grammar School	1990-1998	Auckland, Blues
2004	Dean Budd	Palmerston North Boys' High School	-	Blues, Bennetton, Italy
2009	Sam Cane	Tauranga Boys' College	2012-	Waikato, Chiefs
2016	Caleb Clarke	Mount Albert Grammar School	2020-	Auckland, Blues
1998	Jerry Collins	St. Patrick's College, Wellington	2001-2007	Wellington, Hurricanes
1988	Mark Cooksley	Manurewa High School	1992-2001	Counties Manukau, Waikato, Chiefs
1982,83	Greg Cooper	St John's College, Hastings	1986,92	Hawkes Bay, Otago, Auckland
1984	Matthew Cooper	St John's College, Hastings	1987-1996	Hawkes Bay, Waikato, Highlanders, Chiefs
1987	Simon Crabb	Fraser High School	-	Waikato, Chiefs, New Zealand XV
2006	Ryan Crotty	Shirley Boys' High School	2013-2019	Canterbury, Junior All Blacks, Crusaders, Kubota Spears
2006	Israel Dagg	Lindisfarne College	2010-2017	Hawkes Bay, Junior All Blacks, Highlanders, Crusaders, Yokohama Canon Eagles
2006	Ash Dixon	Christchurch Boys' High School	-	Hurricanes, Highlanders, Maori All Blacks
2007	Elliot Dixon	St Bede's College, Christchurch	2016	Southland, Highlanders, Maori All Blacks, Ricoh Black Rams, Biarritz Olympique
2002	Stephen Donald	Waiuku College	2008-2011	Counties-Manukau, Waikato, Chiefs, Junior All Blacks, Bath Rugby, Suntory Sungoliath
1984	Craig Dorgan	Roncalli College, Timaru	-	South Canterbury, New Zealand Colts, New Zealand Heartland XV
2003, 04	Hika Elliot	Hastings Boys' High School	2008-2015	Hawkes Bay, Counties-Manukau, Poverty Bay, Taranaki, Hurricanes, Chiefs, Maori All Blacks
1982,83	Rhys Ellison	Hamilton Boys' High School	-	Bay Of Plenty, Otago, Waikato, Māori All Blacks, Munster Rugby
2017	Leicester Fainga'anuku	Nelson College	2022-	Tasman, Crusaders
1988	Gordon Falcon	Lindisfarne College	-	Hawkes Bay, Penrith Panthers
1980 (Cpt)	Grant Fox	Auckland Grammar School	1984-93	Auckland, Blues
2005	Owen Franks	Christchurch Boys' High School	2009-2019	Canterbury, Crusaders, Northampton Saints, Hurricanes
2017	Taufa Funaki	Sacred Heart College, Auckland	-	Auckland
1986, 87	Jasin Goldsmith	Forest View High School, Tokoroa	1988	Waikato, Auckland, New Zealand Maori, Bay Of Plenty
1982,84	Rob Gordon	Te Awamutu College	1990	Otago, Waikato, Japan national rugby union team
1984	Steve Gordon	Te Awamutu College	1989-1993	Waikato, Chiefs, Wellington, Highlanders
2017	Cullen Grace	Timaru Boys' High School	2020	Canterbury, Crusaders, Maori All Blacks
2006	Zac Guildford	Napier Boys' High School	2009-2012	Hawkes Bay, Hurricanes, Crusaders, ASM Clermont Auvergne, Wairarapa Bush, Waikato, East Coast
1984	Daryl Halligan	Hamilton Boys' High School	-	Waikato, North Sydney Bears, Canterbury-Bankstown Bulldogs, New Zealand national rugby league team
2006	John Hardie	Southland Boys' High School	-	Highlanders, Edinburgh, Newcastle Falcons, Scotland
2006	Mike Harris	Westlake Boys High School	-	Queensland Reds, Rebels, Lyon, Australia
1982	Paul Henderson	Southland Boys' High School	1989-95	Southland, Otago, Highlanders
1986, 87	Jason Hewett	Kelston Boys' High School	1991	Manawatu, Auckland
1982	Laurence Hullena	Wairarapa College	1990-91	Wellington, North Otago
1986, 87	Craig Innes	Sacred Heart College, Auckland	1989-91	Auckland, Leeds Rhinos, Manly Warringah Sea Eagles
2013	Akira Ioane	Auckland Grammar School	2017-	Auckland, Blues, Maori All Blacks
2014	Rieko Ioane	Auckland Grammar School	2016-	Auckland, Blues, Maori All Blacks
2007	TJ Ioane	Wellington College, Wellington	-	Highlanders, Sale Sharks, London Irish, Glasgow Warriors, Samoa
2016 (Cpt)	Brayden Iose	Palmerston North Boys' High School	-	Manawatu, Hurricanes
1988 (Cpt)	Brandon Jackson	Auckland Grammar School	-	Auckland, Northland
2014	Luke Jacobson	Cambridge High School, New Zealand	2019-	Waikato, Chiefs
2018	Niko Jones	St Peter's College, Auckland	-	Auckland, Moana Pasifika
1987	Jamie Joseph	Church College of New Zealand	1992-95	Otago, Maori All Blacks, Japan national rugby union team
2001	Jerome Kaino	Papakura High School, Saint Kentigern College	2004-2017	Auckland, Blues, Junior All Blacks, Toyota Verblitz, Stade Toulousain
1979	Dean Kenny	Palmerston North Boys' High School	1986	Otago, Sale Sharks
2007-2008	Tawera Kerr-Barlow	Hamilton Boys' High School	2012-2017	Waikato, Chiefs, Maori All Blacks, La Rochelle
1982,83	Emosi Koloto	Palmerston North Boys' High School	-	Widnes Vikings, New Zealand national rugby league team
1986, 87	Pat Lam	St Peter's College, Auckland	1992	Samoa national rugby union team, New Zealand national rugby sevens team
1979	Rod Latham	Linwood High School, Christchurch	-	Canterbury, Junior All Blacks
2004	Tanerau Latimer	Tauranga Boys' College	2009	Bay Of Plenty, Chiefs, Maori All Blacks, Bayonne
2000	Nili Latu	Sacred Heart College, Auckland	-	Bay of Plenty, Newcastle Falcons, Tonga
2003	Sione Lauaki	Waitakere College, Kelston Boys' High School	2005-2008	Waikato, Chiefs, Pacific Islanders, ASM Clermont Auvergne, Bayonne
2011	Ngani Laumape	Palmerston North Boys' High School	2017-2020	New Zealand Warriors, Manawatu, Hurricanes, Stade Français
2004	Sione Lea	Wesley College, Auckland	-	Taranaki, Tonga
1987	Walter Little	Hato Petera College	1990-98	North Harbour, Chiefs, Blues
1993	Jonah Lomu	Wesley College, Auckland	1994-2002	Counties-Manukau, Blues, Chiefs, Hurricanes, Wellington, Cardiff Blues
1986	Willie Losʻe	Kelston Boys' High School	-	Auckland, North Harbour, Yamaha Júbilo, Tonga national rugby union team
2019	Ruben Love	Palmerston North Boys' High School	2014-	Hurricanes
2005	Mat Luamanu	St Patrick's College, Silverstream	-	Wellington, North Harbour, Blues, Benetton Rugby, Harlequins, Bayonne, Samoa
2009	Steve Luatua	Mount Albert Grammar School	2013-2016	Auckland, Blues, Bristol Bears
2001,02	Luke McAlister	Westlake Boys High School	2005-2009	New Zealand Colts, North Harbour, Blues, New Zealand Maori, Sale Sharks, Toulouse
2002,03	Jamie Mackintosh	Southland Boys High School	2008	Southland, Otago, Highlanders, Chiefs, New Zealand Colts, Pau, Austin Gilgronis
2005	Sean Maitland	Hamilton Boys' High School	-	Crusaders, Glasgow, Saracens, Maori All Blacks, Scotland, British & Irish Lions
2013	Damian McKenzie	Christ's College, Christchurch	2016-	Waikato, Chiefs, Maori All Blacks, Tokyo Sungoliath
1989	Simon Mannix	St Patrick's College, Silverstream	1994	Wellington, Hurricanes, Sale Sharks, Gloucester
2005,06	Nasi Manu	Christchurch Boys' High School	-	Crusaders, Highlanders, Edinburgh, Benetton Rugby, Tonga
1990	Tabai Matson	Christ's College, Christchurch	1995-96	Canterbury, Crusaders, CA Brive, London Irish, Yamaha Júbilo, Fiji national rugby union team
1998	Aaron Mauger	Christchurch Boys' High School	2001-2007	Canterbury, Crusaders, New Zealand Colts, Leicester Tigers
2001,02	Liam Messam	Rotorua Boys' High School	2008-2015	Waikato, Chiefs, Toshiba Brave Lupus Tokyo, Toulon
1990	Todd Miller	Kamo High School	1997	Waikato, Chiefs, New Zealand Colts
1998	Malili Muliaina	Cargill High School, Southland Boys' High School, Kelston Boys' High School	2003-2011	Auckland, Waikato, Blues, Chiefs, New Zealand Colts, NTT DoCoMo Red Hurricanes Osaka, Connacht, Zebre Parma
2007,08	Charlie Ngatai	Gisborne Boys' High School	2015	Poverty Bay, Wellington, Taranaki, Hurricanes, Chiefs, Lyon OU, Leinster
2006,07	Tim Nanai-Williams	Manurewa High School	-	New Zealand Sevens, Counties Manukau, Chiefs, Ricoh Black Rams, Clermont, Toulouse, Manu Samoa
1988	Viliami Ofahengaue	Seddon High School	-	New South Wales Waratahs, Australia
1993	Anton Oliver	Marlborough Boys' College	1996-2007	Otago, Highlanders
2015	Dalton Papalii	Saint Kentigern College	2018-	Auckland, Counties Manukau, Blues
2005	Hadleigh Parkes	Palmerston North Boys' High School	-	Manawatu, Auckland, Blues, Southern Kings, Hurricanes, Scarlets, Panasonic Wild Knights, Wales
2009,10	TJ Perenara	Mana College	2013-2021	Wellington, Hurricanes, Maori All Blacks, NTT DoCoMo Red Hurricanes Osaka
2006	Tim Perry	St Andrew's College, Christchurch	2017-18	Mid Canterbury, Tasman, Blues, Crusaders, New Zealand Heartland XV
2004	George Pisi	Massey High School	-	North Harbour, Blues, Taranaki, Clermont, Northampton Saints, Western Force, Manu Samoa
2005, 06	Ken Pisi	Massey High School	-	North Harbour, Northampton Saints, Manu Samoa
2009	Charles Piutau	Wesley College, Auckland	2013-2015	Auckland, Blues, Wasps RFC, Ulster, Bristol Bears, Tonga national rugby union team
2016	Harry Plummer	St Peter's College, Auckland	-	Auckland, Blues
1984	Jon Preston	St Bede's College, Christchurch	1991-1997	Canterbury, Wellington, Hurricanes, Bath Rugby
2016	Billy Proctor	St Patrick's College, Kilbirnie, Wellington	-	Wellington, Hurricanes, Maori All Blacks
2018 (Cpt)	Isaiah Punivai	Christ's College, Christchurch		Canterbury
1980	Lindsay Raki	Manurewa		Counties-Manukau, Auckland, New Zealand Maori
2003	Kieran Read	Rosehill College	2008-2019	Canterbury, Counties Manukau, Crusaders, New Zealand Colts, Junior All Blacks, Toyota Verblitz
1986	Matthew Ridge	Auckland Grammar School	1989	Manly Warringah Sea Eagles, Auckland Warriors, New Zealand national rugby league team
1989	Charles Riechelmann	Auckland Grammar School	1997	Auckland, Blues
2000-02	Joe Rokocoko	Saint Kentigern College	2003-2010	Auckland, Blues, Bayonne, Racing 92
2000	James Ryan	Christ's College, Christchurch	2005-2006	Otago, Highlanders
2009	Francis Saili	St Peter's College, Auckland	2013	Auckland, North Harbour, Blues, Munster, Harlequins, Biarritz Olympique
2011	Ardie Savea	Rongotai College	2016-	Wellington, Hurricanes
2007,08	Julian Savea	Rongotai College	2012-2017	Wellington, Hurricanes, Toulon
1988	Matt Sexton	Shirley Boys' High School	-	Canterbury, Crusaders
1989	Gordon Simpson	Rosmini College	-	North Harbour, Wellington, Hurricanes, Glasgow Warriors, Scotland national rugby union team
1989	Gordon Slater	New Plymouth Boys' High School	1997-2000	New Zealand Colts, Taranaki, Hurricanes
2001,02	Ben Smith	King's High School, Dunedin	2009-2019	Otago, Highlanders
2009	Lima Sopoaga	Wellington College, Wellington	2015-2017	Otago, Highlanders
1978, 79	Neil Sorenson	St Johns, Hastings	-	Wellington
2016	Hoskins Sotutu	Sacred Heart College, Auckland	2020-2021	Auckland, Counties Manukau, Blues
1988,89	Waisake Sotutu	Wesley College, Auckland	-	Counties Manukau, Auckland, Blues
1993	Carlos Spencer	Waiopehu College	1995-2004	Horowhenua-Kapiti, Auckland, Blues
2002	Benson Stanley	Auckland Grammar School	2010	Auckland, Blues, ASM Clermont Auvergne, Pau
2005, 06	Winston Stanley	Auckland Grammar School	-	Auckland, Northland, Harlequins, Blues, Western Force, Manu Samoa
2004	Sherwin Stowers	De La Salle College, Mangere East	-	Counties Manukau, Blues, New Zealand Sevens
1988	Steve Surridge	Saint Kentigern College	1997	New Zealand Colts, Auckland, Canterbury, Crusaders
1982	Timo Tagaloa	Henderson High School	-	Auckland, Wellington, North Harbour, Samoa national rugby union team
2009	Ben Tameifuna	Hastings Boys' High School	-	Hawkes Bay, Chiefs, Waikato, Racing 92, Union Bordeaux Begles, Tonga
2009	Codie Taylor	Feilding High School	2015-	Canterbury, Crusaders, Maori All Blacks
2000	Adam Thomson	Christchurch Boys' High School	2008-2012	Otago, Waikato, Highlanders, Yokohama Canon Eagles, Queensland Reds, NEC Green Rockets
1979	Tony Thorpe	Gisborne Boys' High School	-	Canterbury, Junior All Blacks, New Zealand Emerging Players, New Zealand Divisional Team
2003	Jeremy Thrush	Hutt Valley High School	2013-2015	Wellington, Hurricanes, Gloucester, Western Force
1986, 87	John Timu	Lindisfarne College, Hastings	1988-94	Canterbury-Bankstown Bulldogs, London Broncos, New Zealand national rugby league team
2003	Isaia Toeava	De La Salle College, Mangere East	2005-2011	Auckland, Hurricanes, Blues, Yokohama Canon Eagles, Kubota Spears, ASM Clermont Auvergne, Bayonne
1986	Simon Tremain	Napier Boys' High School	-	Otago, Wellington and Hawke's Bay
1986, 87	Va'aiga Tuigamala	Kelston Boys' High School	1989-93	Auckland, Wigan Warriors, Samoa national rugby league team, Newcastle Falcons
2011	Patrick Tuipulotu	St Peter's College, Auckland	2014-	Auckland, Blues, Toyota Verblitz
2000	Sam Tuitupou	Kelston Boys' High School	2004-2006	Auckland, Blues, Chiefs, Worcester Warriors, Munster, Sale Sharks, Coventry
2011	Roger Tuivasa-Sheck	Otahuhu College	2022-	Sydney Roosters, New Zealand Warriors, Blues
2017 (Cpt)	Quinn Tupaea	Hamilton Boys' High School	2021-	Waikato, Chiefs, Maori All Blacks
2009, 10	Ofa Tu'ungafasi	Mangere College	2016-	Auckland, Blues, Northland
2017	Tupou Vaa'i	Wesley College, Auckland	2020-	Taranaki, Chiefs
2012	Beaudein Waaka	Gisborne Boys High School	-	Taranaki, Manly RUFC, New England Free Jacks, New Zealand Sevens
2012	Regan Ware	Hamilton Boys' High School	-	Waikato, Bay of Plenty, Taranaki, Tasman, Maori All Blacks, New Zealand Sevens
2011	Joe Webber	Hamilton Boys' High School	-	Waikato, Bay of Plenty, New Zealand Sevens
1986	Mark Weedon	Katikati College	-	Bay of Plenty, Crusaders, Chiefs, Wasps RFC
2008	Luke Whitelock	Feilding High School	2013-2018	Canterbury, Crusaders
2005-2006	Sam Whitelock	Feilding High School	2010-	Canterbury, Crusaders
1979	Craig Wickes	Palmerston North Boys' High School	1980	Manawatu, New Zealand Colts
1980	Ian Wood	Auckland Grammar School	-	Manawatu, Auckland, North Harbour, New Zealand Colts, New Zealand Emerging Players
2018	Gideon Wrampling	St Paul's Collegiate School	-	Waikato

== See also ==
- Australia national schoolboy rugby union team
- Ireland national schoolboy rugby union team
- New Zealand national under-19 rugby union team
- New Zealand national under-20 rugby union team
- New Zealand national under-21 rugby union team
- Junior All Blacks
- New Zealand Heartland XV
