= 1986 New Zealand rugby union tour of France =

Summary
P	W	D	L
Total
8	7	0	1
Test match
2	1	0	1
Opponent
P	W	D	L
France
2	1	0	1

The 1986 New Zealand Rugby Union tour of France was a series of eight matches played by the New Zealand national rugby union team (the All Blacks) in France in October and November 1986. The All Blacks won seven of their eight games, losing only the second of the two internationals against France.

== Results ==
Scores and results list All Blacks' points tally first.

Opposing Team	For	Against	Date	Venue	Status
France XV	42	12	21 October 1986	St. de la Meinau, Strasbourg	Tour match
Selection du Centre	23	19	26 October 1986	Stade Marcel-Michelin, Clermont-Ferrand	Tour match
France XV	25	6	28 October 1986	Stade Mayol, Toulon	Tour match
Rousillon-Languedoc	59	6	1 November 1986	Stade Aimé Giral, Perpignan	Tour match
Cote Basque Selection	21	9	4 November 1986	Stade Jean-Dauger, Bayonne	Tour match
France	19	7	8 November 1986	Stade Ernest-Wallon, Toulouse	Test match
French Barbarians	26	12	11 November 1986	St.Marcel-Deflandre, La Rochelle	Tour match
France	3	16	15 November 1986	La Beaujoire, Nantes	Test match

== Touring party ==
- Coach: Brian Lochore
- Captain: Jock Hobbs

=== Backs ===
- John Gallagher (Wellington)
- Kieran Crowley (Taranaki)
- Marty Berry (Wellington)
- Craig Green (Canterbury)
- John Kirwan (Auckland)
- Terry Wright (Auckland)
- Joe Stanley (Auckland)
- Arthur Stone ( Bay of Plenty)
- Grant Fox (Auckland)
- Frano Botica (North Harbour)
- David Kirk (Auckland)
- Dean Kenny (Otago)

=== Forwards ===
- Steve McDowall (Auckland)
- John Drake (Auckland)
- Kevin Boroevich (Wellington)
- Richard Loe (Canterbury)
- Sean Fitzpatrick (Auckland)
- Hika Reid (Bay of Plenty)
- Gary Whetton (Auckland)
- Michael Speight (Northland)
- Murray Pierce (Wellington)
- Andy Earl (Canterbury)
- Mike Brewer (Otago)
- Mark Brooke-Cowden (Auckland)
- Mark Shaw ( Hawkes Bay)
- Jock Hobbs (Canterbury)
- Buck Shelford (North Harbour)
