= 1993 New Zealand rugby union tour of Britain =

Summary
P	W	D	L
Total
13	12	0	1
Test match
2	1	1
Opponent
P	W	D	L
Scotland
1	1	0	0
England
1	0	0	1

The 1993 New Zealand rugby union tour of Britain was a series of thirteen matches played by the New Zealand national rugby union team (the All Blacks) in England, Scotland and Wales from October to December 1993. Twelve of the matches took place in England or Scotland with only the final match against the Barbarians being played in Wales. New Zealand won twelve of their thirteen games, losing only the international match against England – they won the other international against Scotland

== Matches ==
Scores and results list New Zealand's points tally first.

Opposing Team	For	Against	Date	Venue
London & South-East Division	39	12	23 October	Twickenham, London
Midland Division	12	6	26 October	Welford Road, Leicester
South-West Division	19	15	30 October	Recreation Ground, Redruth
Northern Division	27	21	2 November	Anfield, Liverpool
England A	26	12	7 November	Gateshead International Stadium, Gateshead
South of Scotland	84	5	10 November	Netherdale, Galashiels
Scotland A	20	9	13 November	Old Anniesland, Glasgow
Scottish Development XV	31	12	17 November	Myreside, Edinburgh
SCOTLAND	51	15	20 November	Murrayfield, Edinburgh
England Emerging Players	30	19	23 November	Kingsholm, Gloucester
ENGLAND	9	15	27 November	Twickenham, London
Combined Services	13	3	30 November	Devonport Services Ground, Devonport
Barbarians	25	12	4 December	Cardiff Arms Park, Cardiff

== Touring party ==
- Manager: Neil Gray
- Assistant Manager: Earle Kirton
- Coach: Laurie Mains
- Captain: Sean Fitzpatrick

=== Backs ===
- Shane Howarth (Auckland)
- John Timu (Otago)
- Matthew Cooper (Waikato)
- Va'aiga Tuigamala (Auckland)
- Jeff Wilson (Otago)
- Eric Rush (North Harbour)
- Eroni Clarke (Auckland)
- Frank Bunce (North Harbour)
- Lee Stensness (Auckland)
- Marty Berry (Wellington)
- Marc Ellis (Otago)
- Stephen Bachop (Otago)
- Jon Preston (Wellington)
- Stu Forster (Otago)

=== Forwards ===
- Mark "Bull" Allen (Taranaki)
- Craig Dowd (Auckland)
- Graham Purvis (Waikato)
- Olo Brown (Auckland)
- Sean Fitzpatrick (Auckland)
- Norm Hewitt (Hawke's Bay)
- Steve Gordon (Waikato)
- Robin Brooke (Auckland)
- Ian Jones (North Auckland)
- Richard Fromont (Auckland)
- Jamie Joseph (Otago)
- Zinzan Brooke (Auckland)
- Liam Barry (North Harbour)
- Paul Henderson (Southland)
- John Mitchell (Waikato)
- Arran Pene (Otago)
- Blair Larsen (North Harbour) replacement during tour
- Mike Brewer (Otago) replacement during tour
