= Tregaskis =

Tregaskis is a surname. Notable people with the surname include:

- Chris Tregaskis (born 1965), New Zealand rugby union player
- Richard Tregaskis (1916–1973), American journalist and author

== See also ==
- Trevaskis
