= Mark Weedon (rugby union) =

New Zealand rugby union player (1968–2021)

- Born: 31 July 1968 Tauranga, New Zealand
- Died: 7 August 2021 (aged 53)
- Height: 1.98 m (6 ft 6 in)
- Weight: 114 kg (251 lb)
- Occupation: Schoolteacher

Rugby union career
- Position: Lock
Senior career
Years	Team	Apps	(Points)
1997–2000	Wasps RFC	56	(35)
Provincial / State sides
Years	Team	Apps	(Points)
1986–87, 2001–02	Bay of Plenty	32	(14)
1993–96	North Harbour	46	(35)
Super Rugby
Years	Team	Apps	(Points)
1996–97	Crusaders	19	(0)
2002	Chiefs	4	(5)

Mark Weedon (31 July 1968 – 7 August 2021) was a New Zealand rugby union player.

== Biography ==
Born in Tauranga on 31 July 1968, Weedon started playing club rugby in Katikati in the Western Bay of Plenty.

He attended Katikati College and made the 1986 New Zealand national schoolboy rugby union team. A lock, he represented Bay of Plenty at a provincial level from 1986 to 1987, and later from 2001 to 2002, captaining the side during the latter period. Between 1993, and 1996, he played for North Harbour. He played Super Rugby for two New Zealand franchises: the Crusaders in 1996 and 1997, and the Chiefs in 2002. Weedon was an All Blacks triallist in 1995. Between 1997 and 2002, he played professionally in England for Wasps, making 56 appearances.

Weedon had two children. He died on 7 August 2021, aged 53.
