= Kevin Schuler =

NZ international rugby union player & coach

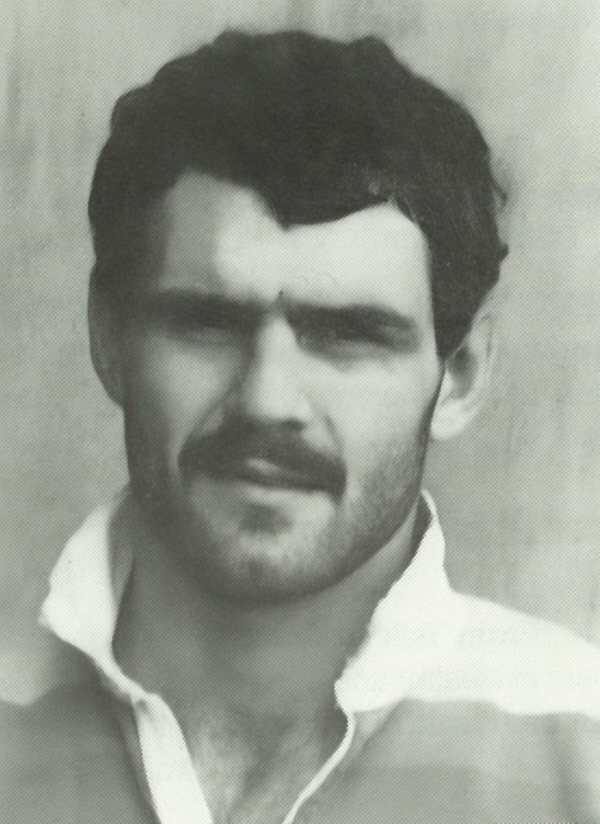
- Born: Kevin Schuler; 1967 (age 58–59) Te Aroha, New Zealand
- Height: 1.89 m (6 ft 2 in)
- Weight: 110 kg (240 lb)
- School: Te Aroha College
- University: Massey University

Rugby union career
- Position: Flanker
Senior career
Years	Team	Apps	(Points)
1996–2008	Yamaha Júbilo		
Provincial / State sides
Years	Team	Apps	(Points)
1987–90	Manawatu	49	
1991–92, 1995	North Harbour	20	
International career
Years	Team	Apps	(Points)
1987–88	New Zealand Colts	7	
1988–89	NZ Universities	9	
1989–95	New Zealand	4	(0)
1990	NZ Divisional XV	3	
Coaching career
- Years: Team
- 2009–10: Yamaha Júbilo
- 2007–08, 2012–: Bay of Plenty

Kevin James Schuler (born 1967) is a New Zealand rugby union coach and former rugby union player. A flanker, Schuler represented Manawatu and North Harbour at a provincial level, and was a member of the New Zealand national side, the All Blacks, between 1989 and 1995. He played 13 matches for the All Blacks including four internationals and the 1995 Rugby World Cup. He moved to Japan in 1996 and played for Yamaha Júbilo, where he became player–coach and later head coach. He has also had coaching roles with Bay of Plenty and the Chiefs in New Zealand.

In 1990, Schuler was named Manawatu sportsperson of the year.
