= Trevaskis =

Trevaskis is a Cornish surname. Notable people with that name include:

- John Trevaskis (1881–1963), Cornish rugby player
- Kennedy Trevaskis (1915–1990), British colonial official
- Liam Trevaskis (born 1999), English cricketer
- Tim Trevaskis (1902–1980), Aussie rules footballer
