= Steve Gordon (rugby union) =

- Born: Steven Bryan Gordon; 16 May 1967 (age 59) Te Awamutu, New Zealand
- Height: 1.98 m (6 ft 6 in)
- Weight: 112 kg (247 lb)
- School: Te Awamutu College
- Notable relative: Rob Gordon (brother)

Rugby union career
- Position: Lock
Provincial / State sides
Years	Team	Apps	(Points)
1987–97	Waikato	141	(13)
1998	Wellington	13	(0)
Super Rugby
Years	Team	Apps	(Points)
1996	Chiefs	2	(0)
1997	Highlanders	10	(0)
International career
Years	Team	Apps	(Points)
1989–93	New Zealand	2	(0)

Steven Bryan Gordon (born 16 May 1967) is a former New Zealand rugby union player. A lock, Gordon represented Waikato (141 games) and Wellington (13 games) at a provincial level, and the Chiefs and Highlanders in Super Rugby.

He was a member of the New Zealand national side, the All Blacks, from 1989 to 1993. He played 19 matches for the team and went on the following tours:

- Canada and the British Isles (1989), including the 51-15 win against Scotland and the 9-15 loss to England.
- France (1990)
- Argentina (1991)
- England and Scotland (1993).
