= Curupaytí =

(Argentina) Curupaytí
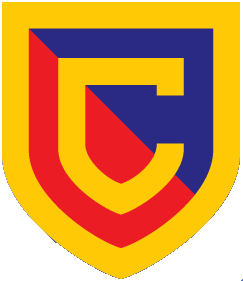
- Full name: Curupayti Club de Rugby
- Union: URBA
- Nickname: Curupa
- Founded: 30 July 1924; 102 years ago
- Region: Hurlingham, Argentina
- Ground: Hurlingham
- President: Pablo Tarca
- Coach(es): Diego Strauss, Diego Mariani and Santiago Rosalin
- League: Primera A
- 2026: 4th. (to promotion playoffs)
Team kit

Curupaytí Club de Rugby is an Argentine rugby union club located in the Hurlingham district of the homonymous partido. The squad currently plays in Primera División A, the second division of the Unión de Rugby de Buenos Aires league system.

== History ==
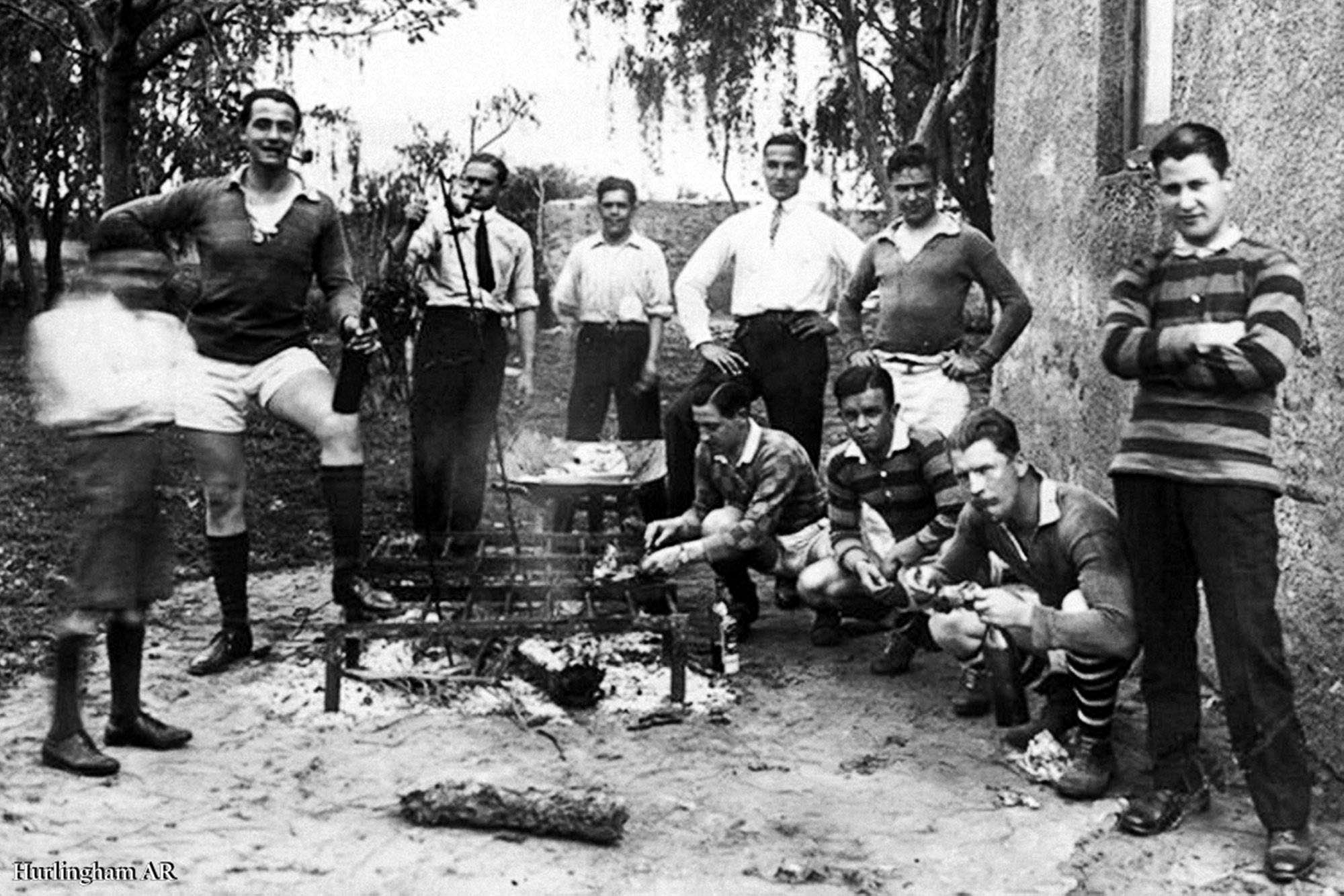
Players of Curupaytí celebrating promotion to Primera in 1929

The idea of forming a club dedicated exclusively to the practise of rugby union was originated in 1924, after the GEBA team arrived to play a match which had to be postponed due to a horse riding was being held on the rugby field.

After some met were celebrated, twelve former GEBA players founded Club Curupaytí. The name was chosen honoring the Asalto de Curupaytí, an attack of Argentine troops over the Paraguayan fort of Curupaytí, during the Paraguayan War (also called "War of the Triple Alliance"). In 1925 Curupaytí became the 10th. club to be registered with RPRU, mentored by Club Atlético San Isidro (CASI) and Club Universitario de Buenos Aires (CUBA).

The club moved to Hurlingham in 1944, after acquiring Quinta La Nena on Acassuso street. One year later, Curupaytí inaugurated its rugby field there.

== Notable players ==
- Mario Ledesma
- Eliseo Branca
- Pedro Sporleder
- Duncan Forrester
- Gualberto Wheeler
