= Chris Tregaskis =

New Zealand rugby union player

- Born: Christopher David Tregaskis; 5 January 1965 (age 61) Lower Hutt, New Zealand
- Height: 2.04 m (6 ft 8 in)
- Weight: 114 kg (251 lb)
- School: Scots College

Rugby union career
- Position: Lock
Provincial / State sides
Years	Team	Apps	(Points)
1988–1995	Wellington	78	
1996	Marlborough	10	
International career
Years	Team	Apps	(Points)
1991	New Zealand	0	(0)

Christopher David Tregaskis (born 5 January 1965) is a former New Zealand rugby union player. A lock, Tregaskis represented Wellington and Marlborough at domestic level. Tregaskis was known as an imposing physical specimen, and was a member of the New Zealand national side, the All Blacks, on the 1991 tour of Argentina. He played four games for the All Blacks but did not play any test matches.
