= Murray Pierce =

- Born: Murray James Pierce; 1 November 1957 (age 69) Timaru, New Zealand
- Height: 1.98 m (6 ft 6 in)
- Weight: 107 kg (16 st 12 lb; 236 lb)
- School: Waitaki Boys' High School; Roxburgh District High School; Dunstan High School
- Occupation: Police officer

Rugby union career
- Position: Lock
Provincial / State sides
Years	Team	Apps	(Points)
- Wellington
International career
Years	Team	Apps	(Points)
1984–90	New Zealand	26	(0)

Murray James Pierce (born 1 November 1957) is a former New Zealand rugby union player who played as a lock forward. He won 26 caps for the All Blacks between 1984 and 1989 and played in the victorious New Zealand team at the 1987 Rugby World Cup. Pierce made his debut for the All Blacks in the 1984 tour to Australia and Fiji. In addition to his 26 international test caps, he played 28 additional games for the All Blacks. Pierce was also a sworn member of the New Zealand Police as were a number of other All Blacks of his era, such as John Gallagher.
