= Shayne Philpott =

- Born: 21 September 1965 Christchurch, New Zealand
- Died: 25 June 2024 (aged 58) Christchurch, New Zealand
- Height: 1.75 m (5 ft 9 in)
- Weight: 80 kg (180 lb)
- School: Burnside High School

Rugby union career
- Position: Utility back
Provincial / State sides
Years	Team	Apps	(Points)
1986–1995	Canterbury	107	(502)
International career
Years	Team	Apps	(Points)
1988–1991	New Zealand	2	(0)
Medal record
Men's rugby union
Representing New Zealand
Rugby World Cup
Bronze medal – third place	1991 UK/France/Ireland	Team

Shayne Philpott (21 September 1965 – 25 June 2024) was a New Zealand rugby union player. A utility back, Philpott represented Canterbury at a provincial level, and was a member of the New Zealand national side, the All Blacks, between 1988 and 1991. He played 14 matches for the All Blacks including two internationals.

Philpott attended Burnside High School in Christchurch from 1979 to 1983.

Philpott died in Christchurch on 25 June 2024, at the age of 58.
