= Rob Gordon =

Japan international rugby union player

- Born: William Robert Gordon; 7 August 1965 (age 61) Te Awamutu, New Zealand
- Height: 1.92 m (6 ft 4 in)
- Weight: 100 kg (220 lb)
- School: Te Awamutu College
- University: University of Otago
- Notable relative: Steve Gordon (brother)

Rugby union career
- Position: Loose forward
Senior career
Years	Team	Apps	(Points)
1992–95	US Colomiers		
1995–99	Toshiba		
Provincial / State sides
Years	Team	Apps	(Points)
1986–87	Otago		
1988–91	Waikato		
International career
Years	Team	Apps	(Points)
1990	New Zealand	0	(0)
1997–99	Japan	17	(20)

William Robert Gordon (born 7 August 1965) is a former New Zealand rugby union player. A loose forward, where he could play either blind side flanker or No. 8. Gordon represented Otago and Waikato at a provincial level. He was a member of the New Zealand national side, the All Blacks, in 1990 on the tour on France, during which he played three matches but no tests. He also appeared in a New Zealand XV in 1991 playing unofficial tests against Russia, an Australian XV and Romania. He established New Zealand and world records for the most tries (5) scored by a forward in a national championship rugby match, which still stand. Between 1997 and 1999, when working and playing rugby for Toshiba in Tokyo, Japan he played 17 test matches for Japan, including three test matches at the 1999 Rugby World Cup.
