= Jeff Wilson (sportsman) =

New Zealand cricketer and rugby union player

Jeff Wilson MNZM
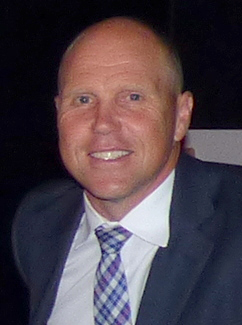
- Wilson in 2016
- Born: Jeffrey William Wilson; 24 October 1973 (age 53) Invercargill, Southland, New Zealand
- Height: 1.80 m (5 ft 11 in)
- Weight: 94 kg (14 st 11 lb)
- School: Cargill High School

Rugby union career
- Position(s): Wing; Fullback
Provincial / State sides
| Years | Team | Apps | (Points) |
| 1993–2002 | Otago | 56 | (410) |
| 1992 | Southland | 7 | (20) |
Super Rugby
| Years | Team | Apps | (Points) |
| 1996–2002 | Highlanders | 72 | (175) |
International career
| Years | Team | Apps | (Points) |
| 1993–2001 | New Zealand | 60 | (234) |
- Cricket career

Personal information
- Batting: Right-handed
- Bowling: Right-arm fast-medium
- Relatives: John Wilson (uncle)

International information
- National side: New Zealand (1993–2005)
- ODI debut (cap 76): 19 March 1993 v Australia
- Last ODI: 1 March 2005 v Australia
- ODI shirt no.: 6
- Only T20I (cap 11): 17 February 2005 v Australia

Domestic team information
- Years: Team
- 1988/89–1990/91: Southland
- 1991/92–1996/97: Otago
- 2002/03: Southland
- 2002/03–2005/06: Otago

Career statistics
| Competition | ODI | T20I | FC | LA |
|---|---|---|---|---|
| Matches | 6 | 1 | 39 | 51 |
| Runs scored | 103 | 18 | 1,245 | 836 |
| Batting average | 20.60 | 18.00 | 21.84 | 20.39 |
| 100s/50s | 0/0 | 0/0 | 0/6 | 0/4 |
| Top score | 44* | 18 | 78 | 99 |
| Balls bowled | 242 | 24 | 7,174 | 2,069 |
| Wickets | 4 | 0 | 129 | 49 |
| Bowling average | 65.00 | – | 24.13 | 29.34 |
| 5 wickets in innings | 0 | – | 7 | 0 |
| 10 wickets in match | 0 | – | 0 | 0 |
| Best bowling | 2/21 | – | 5/34 | 3/6 |
| Catches/stumpings | 4/– | 0/– | 29/– | 30/– |
- Source: Cricinfo, 29 March 2017

Jeffrey William Wilson MNZM (born 24 October 1973) is a New Zealand sportsman who has represented his country in both rugby union and cricket – a so-called "Double All Black", an increasingly rare achievement in the professional era. He is also a basketballer, and won national secondary school titles in track and field. With 44 tries in 60 tests, Wilson is ranked sixteenth on the list of highest test try scorers in rugby. Wilson is married to Adine Wilson (née Harper), former captain of the New Zealand national netball team.

== Rugby career ==
=== Early career ===
Wilson was born at Invercargill in 1973 and attended Cargill High School, where in one rugby game against James Hargest College he scored nine tries and a total of 66 points in a game with a final score of 102–6. At the time tries were only worth 4 points He played for the national secondary schools team against Australia in 1992.

=== All Blacks rugby ===
Wilson was first selected for the All Blacks on their 1993 tour of Britain, making his debut as an All Black against London and SE Division on 23 October 1993 and his test debut against Scotland on 20 November 1993, scoring three tries in that game.

He appeared 71 times for the All Blacks, including 60 tests and played in 1995 and 1999 Rugby World Cup, in the positions of wing and fullback. In Test matches he scored a total of 234 points: 44 tries, 1 conversion, 3 penalty goals, and 1 drop goal.

Wilson announced his retirement at the end of the 2000 Super 12 season, but made a comeback in 2001, playing another 6 Test matches before finally retiring in 2002 at the relatively young age of 28. Wilson stated he would have stayed on had John Hart continued to coach the All Blacks.

Up until 2002, he held the All Blacks try scoring record, with 44 tries from his 60 Test matches. This was later overtaken by fullback Christian Cullen and then Doug Howlett.

In the 2003 New Year Honours, Wilson was appointed a Member of the New Zealand Order of Merit, for services to rugby.

=== Domestic rugby ===
Wilson played Super 12 rugby for the Highlanders and NPC rugby for Otago and Southland. He made his Southland debut in 1992, his Otago debut in 1993 and his Highlanders debut in 1996, with whom he remained for his entire career. Wilson made 56 appearances for Otago and 72 for the Highlanders.

== Cricket career ==
Before making his senior cricket debut, Wilson played Hawke Cup cricket for Southland from 1988 to 1989, for the Otago under-20 team the following season and for a variety of New Zealand age-group teams, including the national under-19 team. He made his senior debut for Otago in a List A match against Auckland in 1991 before making his first-class debut the following month. Playing as an all-rounder, he was a regular in the Otago team throughout the early 1990s, playing 29 first-class matches and taking 93 wickets for the team.

Wilson's international debut came at the age of 19 during the 1992–93 season. He played four One Day Internationals (ODI) against the touring Australians, a few months before his All Black debut. The arrival of the professional Super 12 rugby competition, which overlaps the cricket season by more than six weeks, forced him to decide which sport to pursue, truncating his international cricket career, although he continued to play for Otago until the end of the 1996–97 season.

In May 2002 Wilson, aged 28, announced his retirement from rugby and that he would be returning to cricket. He returned to the Otago team in the 2002–03 season, although injury limited his appearances. The following season he took 23 first-class wickets and scored an average of 52 runnings an innings for Otago before being called back into the New Zealand team during the 2004–05 season. His inclusion in the squad to play a World XI in January 2005 was seen as a surprise and was criticised by some commentators and players, but he played in all three matches during the series taking five wickets, including three for six runs (3/6) in the final match.

Later in the season he was included in the squad for a one-off Twenty20 International against Australia―the first T20 International match played. He played in the match and was also included for the ODI series on Australia's tour of New Zealand, playing in the second and fourth matches of the series. At almost 12 years, the gap between Wilson's ODI appearances set a record for the longest time elapsed between two appearances in ODIs.

Following the end of the 2004–05 season, Wilson had an operation to remove bone spurs from an ankle―an injury which had first been operated on in 2000 and was a result of his rugby career. The injury continued to cause problems during the 2005–06 season and he made only a single one-day appearance for Otago before having to undergo a second operation in early 2006. He did not play top-level cricket again.

== Post-retirement ==
After retirement Wilson spent the next few months breeding horses on a farm in Canterbury. In May 2006 he accepted a position with the Otago Rugby Football Union to promote rugby within the Otago-Southland region in a development role. Rugby officials stated that "it's a brand new position, essentially it's going to be talent identification, a lot of mentoring and coaching one-on-one stuff." Wilson has since progressed to take on the role of Director of Rugby with the Otago Rugby Football Union, dealing with all aspects of the professional game.

Wilson was the assistant coach of the North Harbour team in the ITM Cup between 2009 and 2012. In 2011 it was announced he would join the Auckland Blues as a skills coach for the 2012 season.

In 2013 he became a Sport Radio Breakfast Host with Ian Smith and Nathan Rarere on LiveSPORT Radios Breakfast of Champions. On 7 September 2013, according to the live pregame commentary between All Blacks vs. Argentina, Jeff Wilson was signed by Sky Sports to commentate full-time for both rugby and cricket. Since then, Wilson has become a regular commentator for the channel.

Awards
| Preceded by Danyon Loader | New Zealand's Sportsman of the Year; 1997 | Succeeded by Rob Waddell |
