= Paul McGahan =

- Born: Paul William McGahan; 12 October 1964 (age 62) Pukekohe, New Zealand
- School: Tuakau College
- Occupation: Real estate agent

Rugby union career
- Position: Halfback
Senior career
Years	Team	Apps	(Points)
1992–98	World Fighting Bull		
Provincial / State sides
Years	Team	Apps	(Points)
1985	Counties	3	
1986–92	North Harbour	68	
International career
Years	Team	Apps	(Points)
1990–91	New Zealand	0	(0)

Paul William McGahan (born 12 October 1964) is a former New Zealand rugby union player. A halfback, McGahan represented Counties and North Harbour at a provincial level and was a member of the New Zealand national side, the All Blacks, in 1990 and 1991. He played six matches for the All Blacks but did not gain a test cap.
