= John Gallagher (rugby) =

New Zealand international rugby union & league footballer

- Born: John Gallagher; 29 January 1964 (age 62) Lewisham, London, England
- Height: 1.9 m (6 ft 3 in)
- Weight: 85 kg (13.4 st; 187 lb)
- School: St Joseph's Academy, Blackheath; St. Saviours RC Lewisham (Primary)

Rugby union career
- Position(s): Centre; Fullback
Provincial / State sides
Years	Team	Apps	(Points)
- Marist Saint Patricks
-	Wellington		
-	Oriental Rongotai		
International career
Years	Team	Apps	(Points)
1986–89	New Zealand	41	(251)
1996	Ireland A	1	
- Rugby league career

Playing information
- Position: Fullback
Club
Years	Team	Pld	T	G	FG	P
1990–93	Leeds	45	16	44	1	153
1993–95	London Crusaders	51	19	196	2	470
	Total	96	35	240	3	623

John Anthony Gallagher (born 29 January 1964) is a former rugby union and rugby league footballer who played in the 1980s and 1990s.

Born in England to Irish parents, he moved to New Zealand and played rugby union for New Zealand as a fullback, winning the World Cup in 1987.

In 1990, he moved to rugby league, playing for Leeds, and the London Crusaders as a fullback. Gallagher returned to rugby union and played one game for Ireland A in 1996.

== Early life ==
Gallagher was born in Lewisham, London to Irish parents. An enthusiastic Arsenal football supporter, he was introduced to rugby union at his childhood school, St. Joseph's Academy, Blackheath, where he was required by the headmaster to join the team.

== Rugby union ==
Gallagher first visited New Zealand in 1984 and played for the Oriental Rongotai club in Wellington. He went on to play for the Wellington provincial team, before he returned to England and joined the Metropolitan Police. He subsequently returned to New Zealand and joined the police there, while continuing to play for Wellington. In 1986 Gallagher switched from centre to fullback and his Wellington team won the National Provincial Championship.

He was chosen for the New Zealand national team, the All Blacks, qualifying through permanent residency. He went on to play 41 games (18 test matches) for the All Blacks. Gallagher began with four matches in France in 1986, and continued through the 1987 season, cementing his test match starting spot and winning the inaugural Rugby World Cup that year in Auckland, New Zealand. In 1990 he was named the International Rugby Player of the Year. He did not suffer a loss while representing New Zealand. He is considered by many sources, including the New Zealand Herald and the Telegraph newspapers, to be one of the greatest fullbacks and All Blacks of all time.

== Rugby league ==
In 1990, Gallagher was one of the first of a succession of All Blacks to switch codes to rugby league, following his understudy Matthew Ridge, who signed with the NSWRL's Manly-Warringah Sea Eagles only a week before. Other All Blacks who followed soon after were Frano Botica (Wigan), John Schuster (Newcastle Knights) and two years later Va'aiga Tuigamala (Wigan).

He was initially signed by David Ward for Leeds. He was considered one of the fastest players over 30m when he switched to league, and this was put to good early use by Leeds. He was targeted by opposition players in defence and was badly injured in an alleged spear tackle, playing away at St Helens involving Tea Ropati. He may also have found the tactical differences between the two codes difficult to adjust to, particularly in his favoured full-back position and the move was unsuccessful. Perhaps his finest moment for Leeds came in a match against Australia during the Australian teams 1990 Kangaroo tour when he scored the opening try of the game at Headingley. Gallagher's defense came into question later in that game when giant Kangaroo second rower Paul Sironen scored two tries, both times running over the top of him. Following the signings of fullbacks Morvin Edwards and Alan Tait in the 1991–92 season, Gallagher lost his place in the first team.

Gallagher signed a three-year contract for the London Crusaders in July 1993, and played for two seasons.

== Return to rugby union ==
After his contract with London ended in 1995, and rugby union was turning professional, Gallagher was training with Harlequins in rugby union. In 1995 and 1996 he was involved in training squads for Ireland, and played for Ireland A in the centre against Scotland A in 1996. He also played semi-professionally for Blackheath.

== Later career ==
Gallagher took up teaching in 1994 at Colfe's Preparatory School in south-east London. He spent two years as Director of Rugby at Harlequins, from July 1998 to March 2000, before returning to Colfe's, later becoming headteacher there.

His son, Matt Gallagher, is a professional player with Benetton and has played test for Italy.
