= Laurence Hullena =

- Born: Laurence Clifford Hullena; 24 August 1965 (age 61) Masterton, New Zealand
- Height: 1.82 m (6 ft 0 in)
- Weight: 105 kg (231 lb)
- School: Wairarapa College

Rugby union career
- Position: Prop
Provincial / State sides
| Years | Team | Apps | (Points) |
| 1987–92 | Wellington | 83 | |
| 1993 | North Harbour | 2 | |
International career
| Years | Team | Apps | (Points) |
| 1990–91 | New Zealand | 0 | (0) |

Laurence Clifford Hullena (born 24 August 1965) is a former New Zealand rugby union player. A prop, Hullena represented Wellington and North Harbour at a provincial level, and was a member of the New Zealand national side, the All Blacks, from 1990 to 1991. He played nine matches for the All Blacks but did not play any internationals.
