= Andy Earl (rugby union) =

Andrew Thomas Earl
- Born: 12 September 1961 (age 65) Christchurch
- Height: 1.91 m (6 ft 3 in)
- Weight: 98 kg (216 lb)

Rugby union career
- Position: Forward
International career
Years	Team	Apps	(Points)
1986–1992	New Zealand	45	(57)

Andrew Thomas Earl (born 12 September 1961) is a New Zealand rugby union player who played as a forward. Born in Christchurch, he played 45 times for the All Blacks.

Andy Earl played his club rugby for the Glenmark Rugby Club, in North Canterbury. He played his club rugby alongside fellow club members, Robbie Deans, Richard Loe, and Bruce Deans, with other notable club members such as Alex Wyllie also playing for Glenmark.

Since retiring from rugby, Andy Earl owns a sheep farm near the town of Scargill.
