= Craig Innes =

NZ international rugby union & league footballer

- Full name: Craig Ross Innes
- Born: 10 September 1969 (age 57) New Plymouth, New Zealand
- Height: 6 ft 1 in (185 cm)
- Weight: 14 st 9 lb (93 kg)

Rugby union career
- Position: Centre
Senior career
| Years | Team | Apps | (Points) |
- Marist Brothers
- Ponsonby
| 1998-00 | Auckland Blues | | |
International career
| Years | Team | Apps | (Points) |
| 1989-91 | New Zealand | 17 | (24) |
- Rugby league career

Playing information
- Position: Centre
Club
| Years | Team | Pld | T | G | FG | P |
|---|---|---|---|---|---|---|
| 1992–96 | Leeds | 135 | 52 | 0 | 0 | 208 |
| 1995 | Western Reds | 10 | 4 | 0 | 0 | 16 |
| 1996–97 | Manly Sea Eagles | 50 | 25 | 11 | 0 | 122 |
| | Total | 195 | 81 | 11 | 0 | 346 |
Representative
| Years | Team | Pld | T | G | FG | P |
| 1993 | Auckland | 2 | 1 | 0 | 0 | 4 |
| 1997 | Rest of the World | 1 |

Craig Ross Innes (born 10 September 1969), also known by the nickname of "Postie", is a New Zealand former rugby union and rugby league footballer who played in the 1980s and 1990s. After a successful rugby union career which saw him represent his country he switched to rugby league, playing in both England and Australia, winning the 1996 ARL Premiership, before playing out the last years of his career in rugby union in New Zealand.

== Background ==
Craig Innes was born in New Plymouth on the West Coast of New Zealand's North Island on 10 September 1969.

== Rugby union ==
Innes played rugby union in New Zealand and made his international début at age 20 on the wing in a Test against Wales during the All Blacks' 1989 tour of Wales and Ireland. He scored two tries on début. Innes went on to play in 17 tests for the All Blacks, including the 1991 Rugby World Cup.

== Rugby league ==
Innes turned professional in 1992, leaving New Zealand to join English rugby league club Leeds. He helped Leeds reach the 1994 and 1995 Challenge Cup finals, playing against former All Black teammate Va'aiga Tuigamala in both matches. Innes' move to Australia to play for new ARL outfit, the Western Reds in the 1995 season brought threats of legal action from Leeds. He returned to England to make the last of his 135 appearances for Leeds before leaving the club in 1996, shortly before the start of the inaugural Super League season.

Australian club Manly-Warringah Sea Eagles secured his services for the 1996 ARL Premiership season, and he played alongside fellow former All Black, Matthew Ridge in the Sea Eagles' Grand final victory that year, scoring the first try of the match. At the height of the Super League war in 1997 Innes was unable to play representative rugby league for New Zealand due to the New Zealand Rugby League's alignment with Super League, and his club Manly's alignment with the Australian Rugby League. He did however appear in one match for a 'Rest of the World' team assembled to play against the ARL's Australian side. With the ARL isolated from the other international bodies during the Super League war, they instigated a game against a Rest of the World side to give its players a chance to represent internationally. The world side included high-profile British Test players Gary Connolly and Jason Robinson who had signed contracts promising to eventually join an ARL club. This was the only time the ARL granted Test status to a Rest of the World encounter. Innes thus became a dual-code rugby international in that match. Innes' club, the Sea Eagles were minor premiers in the 1997 ARL season, and reached the grand final, in which he scored a try, but it was not enough to defeat Newcastle.

At the end of the 1997 season, Innes returned to New Zealand to play out the rest of his football career in the Super 12 rugby union competition for the Auckland Blues. Since retirement from playing, he has been involved in professional player management.

== Personal life ==
Craig has two children and was married to former model, television host and judge on New Zealand's Next Top Model, Sara Tetro.
