= Ian Jones (rugby union, born 1967) =

Ian Jones MNZM
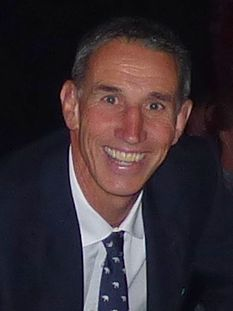
- Jones in 2016
- Born: Ian Donald Jones; 17 April 1967 (age 59) Whangārei, New Zealand
- Height: 1.98 m (6 ft 6 in)
- Weight: 104 kg (16 st 5 lb)
- School: Kamo High School

Rugby union career
- Position: Lock
Senior career
Years	Team	Apps	(Points)
1999-2001	Gloucester Rugby		
2001-2002	London Wasps		
Provincial / State sides
Years	Team	Apps	(Points)
1988-1993	Northland	66	
1993-1999	North Harbour	53	
Super Rugby
Years	Team	Apps	(Points)
1996-99	Chiefs	38	
International career
Years	Team	Apps	(Points)
1990-1999	New Zealand	79	(42)

Ian Donald Jones MNZM (born 17 April 1967) is a former New Zealand rugby union player. He played 79 tests for the All Blacks. He is one of New Zealand's most capped locks and formed one of the most famous lock pairings in international rugby, often partnered with Robin Brooke in the All Blacks from 1992 to 1998. What Jones lacked in size he more than made up for in skill, Jones was picked over physically intimidating locks such as Mark Cooksley who was the tallest All Black ever. Jones made his All Black debut Saturday, 16 June 1990 v Scotland at Dunedin. At the time he was 23 years, 60 days old.

Jones had an impressive start with a try on debut. Coincidentally six years later Jones played his 50th test, again at Carisbrook and again with Scotland the opponent. He scored at virtually the same exact spot in the stadium as he did six years before. Throughout his impressive career Jones was renowned for his ability in line-outs.

In the Super 12 Jones made 38 appearances, often as captain, for the Chiefs between 1996 and 1999. He once scored three tries in a match, against the Waratahs in 1996. In 1998 he was handed a lengthy suspension after a stomping incident involving the Hurricanes' Jason O'Halloran.

Jones started his career with Northland in 1988 as a string bean 20-year-old lock who was tipped for big things back then. He picked up the nickname "Kamo" after his home town just north of Whangārei in New Zealand's Northland region.

In total Jones played 105 matches for the All Blacks including 79 tests. Jones was named captain for one match. Jones scored a total of 14 tries in All Blacks matches with nine of those in test matches.

== Retirement ==
Jones now works as a television rugby commentator for Sky Sports and presented their now defunct programme 'RugbyCentre'.

In the 2010 New Year Honours, Jones was appointed a Member of the New Zealand Order of Merit for services to rugby.
