= John Timu (rugby) =

New Zealand dual-code rugby international footballer

Personal information
- Full name: John Kahukura Raymond Timu
- Born: 8 May 1969 (age 57) Dannevirke, New Zealand

Playing information
- Height: 180 cm (5 ft 11 in)
- Weight: 82 kg (12 st 13 lb)

Rugby union
- Position: Full-back or wing
Club
Years	Team	Pld	T	G	FG	P
1988–95	Otago	101				340
Representative
Years	Team	Pld	T	G	FG	P
1988–94	New Zealand	26				31

Rugby league
- Position: Centre
Club
Years	Team	Pld	T	G	FG	P
1995–97	Canterbury Bulldogs	61	17	5	0	78
1998–00	London Broncos	70	16	0	0	64
	Total	131	33	5	0	142
Representative
Years	Team	Pld	T	G	FG	P
1995–97	New Zealand	9	4	0	0	16

John Kahukura Raymond Timu (born 8 May 1969) is a New Zealand former rugby league and rugby union footballer who played in the 1980s and 1990s who achieved international selection for New Zealand in both rugby codes, appearing in 26 tests for the All Blacks in union and nine for the Kiwis in league. Timu's usual position was centre in league and in union he would play at full-back or on the wing.

== Rugby union ==
=== High school ===
John Timu attended Lindisfarne College in Hastings and played rugby for their first XV where he scored 92 tries in 55 games between 1985 and 1987. After finishing school, he moved to Dunedin to attend the University of Otago.

=== Otago ===
John Timu played representative rugby union for Otago, including playing for the 1991 team that won the first division championship. He also played in the 1993 Otago team that defeated the British and Irish Lions. He scored one try in the 37-24 result. John Timu was part of a backline for Otago that included Paul Cooke, Marc Ellis, Jeff Wilson and John Leslie.

=== New Zealand Maori ===
John Timu played for the New Zealand Maori rugby team from 1988 to 1994 scoring seven tries for them.

=== All Blacks ===
John Timu was first selected for the All Blacks on their 1989 tour to Europe to replace an injured John Kirwan. He played for New Zealand in the 1991 Rugby World Cup scoring two tries at fullback against a very physical Canadian side in the quarterfinals.

Also in 1991 Timu was awarded the Tom French Cup as Māori player of the year. In the 1992 South Africa vs New Zealand rugby union match he played for the All Blacks, scoring a try. He was then selected to go on the 1993 New Zealand rugby union tour of Britain.

== Rugby league ==
John Timu commenced his professional rugby league career in 1995 with the newly re-branded Sydney Bulldogs club. In his first season, he was selected to play for the New Zealand national team in the second and third matches of the 1995 Trans-Tasman Test series. Timu played in the centres for the Bulldogs in their victory in the 1995 Winfield Cup Grand Final. He was selected for New Zealand's 1995 Rugby League World Cup squad but didn't play any games due to injury.

During the 1996 Great Britain Lions tour Timu was selected to play for New Zealand at centre in all three Test matches, scoring two tries in the first. Timu was selected to play for New Zealand at centre in the 1997 Anzac Test. After the 1997 Super League season he left the Bulldogs to play in England.

Timu played for the London Broncos at centre in the 1999 Challenge Cup Final. There were rumours that after finishing his contract with the London Broncos, John Timu would return to play rugby for Otago but this did not happen.

Awards
Preceded by Steve McDowall	Tom French Memorial; Māori rugby union player of the year 1991	Succeeded by Zinzan Brooke
