= Bernie McCahill =

Bernard Joseph McCahill
- Born: Bernard Joseph McCahill; 28 June 1964 (age 62) Auckland, New Zealand
- Height: 1.83 m (6 ft 0 in)
- Weight: 78 kg (12 st 4 lb)
- School: St Peter's College, Auckland

Rugby union career
- Position(s): Second five-eighth, centre three-quarter
Amateur team(s)
Years	Team	Apps	(Points)
- Auckland Marist
Provincial / State sides
Years	Team	Apps	(Points)
- Auckland
International career
Years	Team	Apps	(Points)
1987–1991	All Blacks	32	(16)

Bernard Joseph McCahill (born 28 June 1964) is a former rugby union player from New Zealand who played for Auckland RFU and the All Blacks.

McCahill was educated at St Peter's College. He played in two positions, second five-eighth and centre three-quarter. He played 32 matches for the All Blacks from 1987 until 1991 including 10 tests. As well as two World Cup tournaments, he participated in 5 overseas tours. He also appeared in five zonal matches, five trials and was in the New Zealand XV and New Zealand B selections in 1991. He scored four tries for New Zealand.

McCahill was first chosen for the first World Cup in 1987 and played in the pool match against Argentina and was a replacement in the quarter-final against Scotland and the semi-final against Wales. He was a backup midfield player until 1991, when he played in four of the World Cup matches. He is the brother of Sean McCahill, a former Irish rugby international.
