= Alan Whetton =

- Born: Alan James Whetton; 15 December 1959 (age 66) Auckland, New Zealand
- Height: 1.94 m (6 ft 4 in)
- Weight: 100 kg (15 st 10 lb; 220 lb)
- School: Auckland Grammar
- Notable relative: Gary Whetton

Rugby union career
- Position: Flanker
Provincial / State sides
Years	Team	Apps	(Points)
1980–1992	Auckland		
International career
Years	Team	Apps	(Points)
1984–1991	New Zealand	65	(40)

Alan Whetton (born 15 December 1959) also known as AJ is a former rugby union footballer who played for New Zealand's national team, the All Blacks. Whetton first played representative rugby for Auckland in 1981. He played alongside his twin brother Gary for Auckland and later the All Blacks. He played a variety of positions early in his career, playing at number eight and lock before playing most often as a flanker. He first played for the All Blacks in 1984 on their tour of Australia, and played his first Test match on 21 July against Australia.

He toured with the controversial New Zealand Cavaliers on their tour of South Africa in 1986. He was banned for two matches for participating in the tour, but by 1987 had cemented his place in the All Blacks. As part of a loose forward trio with Buck Shelford and Michael Jones that played 13 Tests together, Whetton played throughout the All Blacks victorious Rugby World Cup campaign of 1987, scoring a try in each of the Pool matches, the Quarter Final and Semi Final.

Whetton continued to play for the All Blacks until their semi-final defeat to Australia at the 1991 World Cup. He played for Auckland in 1992, and finished with 150 matches for his province. Following retirement from rugby in New Zealand, he was a player coach for Kobe Steel between 1996 and 1999. He was a commentator for New Zealand's TV3 network during their coverage of the 2007 Rugby World Cup,. Whetton is currently part of the Solid Gold (radio) breakfast team and is involved in the business of sporting signage. In his personal life, Whetton is married with two daughters.
