= Graham Purvis =

- Born: Graham Herbert Purvis; 12 October 1961 (age 65) Waihi, New Zealand
- Height: 1.83 m (6 ft 0 in)
- Weight: 105 kg (231 lb)
- School: Waihi College

Rugby union career
- Position: Prop
Provincial / State sides
| Years | Team | Apps | (Points) |
| 1983 | Thames Valley | 3 | |
| 1984–93, 97 | Waikato | 147 | |
International career
| Years | Team | Apps | (Points) |
| 1989–93 | New Zealand | 2 | (4) |

Graham Herbert Purvis (born 12 October 1961) is a former New Zealand rugby union player. A prop, Purvis represented Thames Valley and Waikato at a provincial level, and was a member of the New Zealand national side, the All Blacks, from 1989 to 1993. He played 28 matches for the All Blacks including two internationals.
