= Walter Little (rugby union) =

- Born: Walter Kenneth Little; 14 October 1969 (age 57) Tokoroa, New Zealand
- Height: 1.78 m (5 ft 10 in)
- Weight: 76 kg (12 st 0 lb)
- School: Hato Petera College
- Notable relative(s): Nicky Little; Lawrence Little

Rugby union career
- Position: fly-half/centre
Amateur team(s)
Years	Team	Apps	(Points)
1988–2000	Glenfield		
Provincial / State sides
Years	Team	Apps	(Points)
1988–00	North Harbour	147 games	
Super Rugby
Years	Team	Apps	(Points)
1996–99	Chiefs		
2000	Blues		
International career
Years	Team	Apps	(Points)
1990–1998	New Zealand	50	(44)

Walter Kenneth Little (born 14 October 1969) is a former rugby union player from New Zealand. He played in the second five-eighth position for New Zealand and for North Harbour. He was known for his combination with Frank Bunce.

Walter Little made his All Blacks debut in 1989 from the Glenfield Rugby Club in the North Harbour club competition.
