= Mike Brewer (rugby union) =

NZ international rugby union player

- Born: Michael Robert Brewer; 6 November 1964 (age 62) Pukekohe, New Zealand
- Height: 6 ft 5 in (1.96 m)
- Weight: 16 st 3 lb (103 kg)

Rugby union career
- Position: Flanker / Number Eight
International career
Years	Team	Apps	(Points)
1986-1995	All Blacks	32	(4)
Coaching career
- Years: Team
- 2008-09 2010: Scotland; Sale Sharks

Michael Robert Brewer (born 6 November 1964) is a New Zealand former rugby union footballer. He played rugby union as flanker or number eight and represented the All Blacks on 32 occasions scoring 1 try and winning 22 and drawing 1 of those games. He played provincial rugby for Otago and Canterbury in New Zealand's south Island.

Since his retirement from playing Brewer has become a coach and has coached in Italy and then in Ireland. In August 2008 he signed a contract with the Scottish National Rugby Union team as their forwards coach working, alongside Frank Hadden the head coach. He quit in May 2009, after missing out on the head coach position when Hadden was dropped. Brewer was technical director for the Flying Fijians National Team ahead of their 2009 European Tour. He became head coach of Guinness Premiership side Sale Sharks in April 2010, taking over from Jason Robinson. Brewer instigated a number of changes including signing more than ten new players and releasing a similar number. In December, he was sacked as Sale had won just three of their first nine matches of the 2010/11 season. However, he had originally agreed a 3-year club plan which was still in its infancy.
