= Steve McDowall =

New Zealand rugby union player

- Born: Steven Clark McDowall; 27 August 1961 (age 65) Rotorua, New Zealand
- Height: 1.82 m (6 ft 0 in)
- Weight: 102 kg (16 st 1 lb; 225 lb)
- School: Western Heights High School

Rugby union career
- Position: Prop
Provincial / State sides
Years	Team	Apps	(Points)
1982–1984	Bay of Plenty		
1985–1989	Auckland		
1989	Bay of Plenty		
1990–1993	Auckland		
1994	Wellington		
1998	Auckland		
International career
Years	Team	Apps	(Points)
1986–1991	New Zealand	46	(12)

Steven Clark McDowall (often erroneously written McDowell; born 27 August 1961) is a former New Zealand rugby union player. He played as a prop and he won 46 full caps for the All Blacks between 1985 and 1992.

He was also a member of the victorious New Zealand squad at the 1987 Rugby World Cup.

He has been the assistant coach of Romania national rugby union team since 2010.

Awards
Preceded by Buck Shelford	Tom French Memorial; Māori rugby union player of the year 1990	Succeeded by John Timu
