= Terry Wright (rugby union) =

NZ rugby union player (born 1963)

- Born: Terence John Wright; 21 January 1963 (age 63) Auckland, New Zealand
- Height: 1.83 m (6 ft 0 in)
- Weight: 75 kg (165 lb)
- School: Northcote College

Rugby union career
- Position(s): Wing, fullback
Provincial / State sides
Years	Team	Apps	(Points)
1984–93	Auckland	135	(560)
International career
Years	Team	Apps	(Points)
1986–92	New Zealand	30	(72)
National sevens team
Years	Team		Comps
1986–92	New Zealand 7s		11

Terence John Wright (born 21 January 1963) is a former New Zealand rugby union player. A wing and fullback, Wright represented Auckland at a provincial level.

He was selected as one of the “Five promising players” in the 1985 Rugby Almanack of New Zealand and one of the "Five players of the year" for the 1989 and 1991 seasons.

He was a member of the New Zealand national side, the All Blacks, from 1986 to 1992. He played 64 matches for the All Blacks including 30 internationals. He was a member of the victorious New Zealand squad at the 1987 Rugby World Cup. Wright was known for his slim physique during his playing career. He also played for Sudbury RFC, Suffolk, U.K.

Wright is a trained accountant and has lived overseas for several years in Sydney, Tokyo, Hong Kong and Singapore with his wife and children.
