= Paul Henderson (rugby union) =

- Born: Paul William Henderson; 21 September 1964 (age 62) Bluff, New Zealand
- Height: 1.88 m (6 ft 2 in)
- Weight: 90 kg (198 lb)
- School: Southland Boys' High School

Rugby union career
- Position: Flanker
Provincial / State sides
Years	Team	Apps	(Points)
1983–86, 92–97	Southland	89	
1987–91	Otago	71	
Super Rugby
Years	Team	Apps	(Points)
1996	Highlanders		
International career
Years	Team	Apps	(Points)
1989–95	New Zealand	7	(9)

Paul William Henderson (born 21 September 1964) is a New Zealand former rugby union player.

A flanker, Henderson represented Southland and Otago at a provincial level and the Highlanders in Super Rugby. He played for the New Zealand national team, the All Blacks, 25 times between 1989 and 1995, including seven test matches. He captained New Zealand once, in their 145–17 victory over Japan at the 1995 Rugby World Cup.
