= Grant Fox =

NZ international rugby union player

Grant Fox MBE
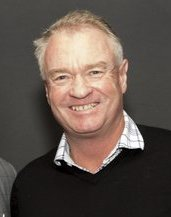
- Fox in 2018
- Born: Grant James Fox; 16 June 1962 (age 64) New Plymouth, New Zealand
- Height: 1.75 m (5 ft 9 in)
- Weight: 72 kg (11 st 5 lb)
- School: Auckland Grammar School
- University: University of Auckland
- Notable relative(s): Ryan Fox (son); Gregory Wallace (brother-in-law); Merv Wallace (father-in-law)

Rugby union career
- Position: Fly-half (rugby union)
Provincial / State sides
Years	Team	Apps	(Points)
1982–93	Auckland	189	(2746)
International career
Years	Team	Apps	(Points)
1984–93	New Zealand	46	(645)
Coaching career
- Years: Team
- 1999–2003: Auckland
- –: Blues

Grant James Fox MBE (born 16 June 1962) is a former rugby union player from New Zealand. He was a member of the All Blacks team that won the inaugural Rugby World Cup in 1987. Fox holds the world record for most points scored in a Rugby World Cup tournament of 126 in the 1987 Rugby World Cup. He also holds the world record for most conversions in one world cup tournament of 30, also from 1987. He is the father of professional golfer Ryan Fox.

== Playing career ==
Fox was born in New Plymouth. He attended Auckland Grammar school.

During his time with the All Blacks from 1985 to 1993, he wore the number 10 jersey (first five-eighth or fly-half), and was the main goalkicker for the All Blacks. He amassed 645 points from 46 All Black test matches (1 try, 118 conversions, 128 penalties, 7 drop goals). He is considered a true pioneer of the modern art of goal kicking, in particular the technicalities of leaning the ball forward, which has been adopted by world class kickers since. Fox is regarded as one of the greatest first five-eighths in All Blacks' history, even though he was not a great runner with the ball in hand.

Despite his relatively short height, he made up for this with fantastic distribution skills reinforced by his long-term colleague John Kirwan's then-world-record career statistics playing outside him for Auckland and the All Blacks. His inability to score tries was often a joking point in the team – his cause not helped by an overruled attempt against Ireland in 1989 (due to a prior technical infringement by a teammate).

Fox was a member of the New Zealand Cavaliers which toured apartheid South Africa in 1986, following the cancellation of the official NZRFU tour in 1985. For participating in the rebel tour Fox was banned from selection in the All Blacks for three tests.

The highlight of Fox's career was winning the inaugural Rugby World Cup with New Zealand in 1987, a victory based in part on his accurate kicking.

Fox was selected as one of the "Five players of the year" for the 1984, 1988, 1989, 1990 and 1993 seasons, in the Rugby Almanack of New Zealand.

== Coaching and broadcasting ==
In the 1995 New Year Honours, Fox was appointed a Member of the Order of the British Empire, for services to rugby.

Fox remained an integral part of his Auckland union, involved at a coaching level and sharing in their success in the 1999 and 2002–2003 NPC seasons.

Fox is now a commentator on Sky Sports, NBC Sports and in the EA Sports rugby union series.

Fox provided commentary on the Rugby World Cup on ABC in 1995, with Al Michaels in 1999 and 2003 and Mike Tirico in 2007.

Fox is currently a selector with the New Zealand All Blacks (2011–present)
