= Richard Loe =

NZ international rugby union player

- Born: Richard Wyllie Loe; 6 April 1960 (age 66) Christchurch, New Zealand
- Height: 1.88 m (6 ft 2 in)
- Weight: 116 kg (18 st 4 lb)
- School: Christchurch Boys' High School
- Notable relative: Olivia Loe (daughter)

Rugby union career
- Position: Prop
Amateur team(s)
Years	Team	Apps	(Points)
- ChCh HSOB
Provincial / State sides
Years	Team	Apps	(Points)
1995–1996	Canterbury		
1985–1994	Waikato		
1982–1984	Marlborough		
1980–1981	Canterbury		
Super Rugby
Years	Team	Apps	(Points)
1997	Chiefs		
1996	Crusaders		
International career
Years	Team	Apps	(Points)
1987–1995	New Zealand	49	(25)

Richard Wyllie Loe (born 6 April 1960) is a New Zealand former rugby union player. He won 49 international caps for New Zealand, the All Blacks, as a prop forward. He is a sports broadcaster on BSport, Radio Live and SKY Sport.

== Private life ==
Loe was born in 1960 in Christchurch, New Zealand. He is a nephew of Alex "Grizz" Wyllie. He was married to Felicity. Two of their daughters, Jessica and Olivia Loe, have represented New Zealand in rowing.

== Domestic career ==
A product of Christchurch Boys' High School and its 1st XV captained by Steve Hansen, Loe played for a number of age-grade Canterbury sides. Originally pursuing a career with the stock agency firm, Pyne Gould Guinness, Loe played for the Glenmark and HSOB clubs, making his senior debut for the former at the age of 17. Loe began his first-class career with Canterbury in 1980, before playing for Marlborough and, for the majority of his career, Waikato from 1985 – 1994, before returning to Canterbury for the 1995 and 1996 seasons. Loe also played in France with RC Vichy from 1990 to 1992. Loe was known as a dirty player and was banned for 6 months for eye gouging in a match against Otago. Throughout his career he received numerous bans for striking, eye-gouging and other foul play.

== International career ==
Loe's international debut came in 1986 at the age of 26 against the French Barbarians. Loe represented New Zealand in three Rugby World Cup tournaments. He was part of the 1987 Rugby World Cup victorious All Black squad, playing in two tests versus Italy and Argentina. He then played on the All Black team that lost to Australia in the 1991 Rugby World Cup semi-final. He was also part of the side that lost the 1995 Rugby World Cup final 12–15 to South Africa in a game where the All Blacks had been favorites. His last test was in 1995, when, aged 35, he was part of the New Zealand side that beat France 37–12.

He played 49 Tests between 1987 and 1995. His test record consisted of 37 wins, 2 draws, and 10 losses. In addition, he played 29 non-test matches for the All Blacks, 3 as captain.

== Post-rugby ==
Following retirement, Loe retired to his dairy farm and became a sports columnist in New Zealand. He also does touch line commentary for Sky TV in New Zealand and is an occasional guest on the rugby TV show re-Union. He does a 'Farming and Footy' show called On The Field on sport radio station LiveSPORT which is replayed on Radio Live (and LiveSPORT) the following day.

== See also ==
- High School Old Boys RFC
