= Va'aiga Tuigamala =

Samoa international rugby league & union footballer (1969–2022)

Va'aiga Tuigamala MNZM
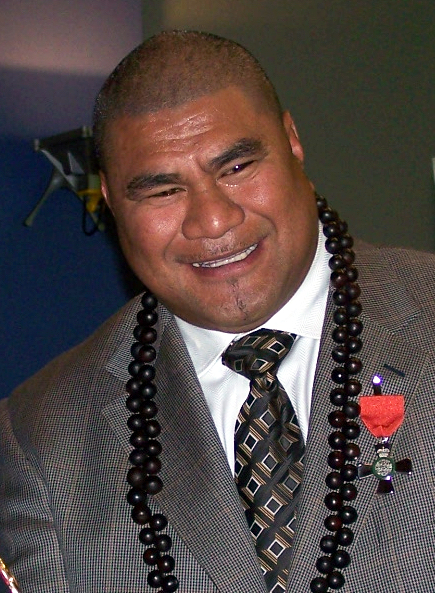
- Tuigamala in 2008
- Born: Va'aiga Lealuga Tuigamala; 4 September 1969 Faleasiu, A'ana, Western Samoa
- Died: 24 February 2022 (aged 52) Auckland, New Zealand
- Height: 180 cm (5 ft 11 in)
- Weight: 110 kg (17 st 5 lb; 240 lb)
- School: Kelston Boys' High School
- Notable relative: David Tua (cousin)

Rugby union career
- Position(s): Wing; Centre
Amateur team(s)
Years	Team	Apps	(Points)
- Ponsonby
Senior career
Years	Team	Apps	(Points)
1996–1997	Wasps	13	(20)
1997–2002	Newcastle	113	(160)
Provincial / State sides
Years	Team	Apps	(Points)
1988–1993	Auckland	49	(140)
International career
Years	Team	Apps	(Points)
1989–1993	New Zealand	19	(21)
1996–2001	Samoa	23	(15)
- Rugby league career

Playing information
- Position: Centre; Wing
Club
Years	Team	Pld	T	G	FG	P
1993–97	Wigan	102				254
Representative
Years	Team	Pld	T	G	FG	P
1995	Samoa	2				8

Va'aiga Lealuga Tuigamala Pulelua Fesola'i MNZM (4 September 1969 – 24 February 2022), often known as Inga Tuigamala, was a professional rugby union and rugby league footballer. Born in Western Samoa, he represented New Zealand in rugby union, winning 19 caps, and later Samoa in both rugby league (two caps) and rugby union (23 caps). He played in one rugby league and two rugby union World Cups.

Tuigamala began his career in rugby union, and played provincially for Auckland. He changed codes from rugby union to rugby league, and became an integral part of the successful Wigan team of the 1990s. He returned to rugby union, winning English championships with London Wasps and Newcastle Falcons.

A centre or wing, he was known as a powerful runner, much larger than most rugby wingers of the time.

== Early life ==
Born in Faleasiu, Samoa, Tuigamala and his family moved to New Zealand when he was 4 years old. He grew up in southern Glendene in West Auckland, New Zealand. He was from Tongan and Samoan Descent.

== Playing career ==
=== Rugby union ===
He played in New Zealand for Ponsonby and Auckland. He represented New Zealand (the All Blacks) in rugby union as a winger from 1989, playing his first test match against the United States in 1991. At the time, Tuigamala was the first person born in Samoa to play for the All Blacks. He won 19 caps, including playing at the 1991 World Cup.

He was the first player to score a try worth 5 points on July 4, 1992, in a match against Australia.

Nicknamed "Inga the Winger", he converted to rugby league, signing with English club Wigan in 1993. His biography Inga the Winger by Bob Howitt was also published in 1993.

=== Rugby league ===
In rugby league, Tuigamala played as a centre in a successful Wigan team, winning several trophies over four seasons. Tuigamala played from the interchange bench in Wigan's 1994 World Club Challenge victory over Australian premiers, the Brisbane Broncos, in Brisbane.

He also played international rugby league for Samoa, including at the 1995 World Cup. At the end of 1996's Super League I, Tuigamala was named at centre in the Super League Dream Team.

=== Return to rugby union ===
When rugby union became openly professional in 1995, Tuigamala was one of a number of former rugby union players who returned from rugby league. He played for London Wasps, winning the English Premiership, and later joined Newcastle Falcons in a world record £1m deal. He scored a hat-trick on his third appearance for Newcastle against Moseley at Kingston Park and was an important part of the 1998 Championship-winning side, making 16 appearances that season. He then delayed an arm operation to put in a Man of the Match performance in the 2001 Cup Final. Upon signing for the Falcons, teammate Doddie Weir called Tuigamala "simply the best rugby player in the world".

He made his début for Western Samoa in 1996 against Ireland, going on to play 23 test matches, scoring 3 tries. He was an important part of the Samoa squad at the 1999 World Cup.

He was known for his Christian faith, and in particular for the influence he had on Jason Robinson, a teammate at Wigan. Tuigamala shared his Christian faith, though it wasn't until some time later that Robinson became a Christian.

== Post-playing ==
Following the end of his rugby career, he acted as advisor for his cousin David Tua, a professional heavyweight boxer, and ran a funeral director company, "Tuigamala and Sons of Glendene" for which the most notable client to date was the late King of Tonga, Taufa'ahau Tupou IV.

In the 2008 Queen's Birthday Honours, Tuigamala was appointed a Member of the New Zealand Order of Merit, for services to rugby and the community.

In October 2009, he travelled to Samoa with David Tua to see how they could assist in the aftermath of the Samoa tsunami.

On 22 May 2014, he promoted a boxing event at the Logan Campbell Centre in Auckland, New Zealand. The event was broadcast by New Zealand's Sky TV on pay-per-view. In the event, he and his two sons all fought, with all three winning their respective bouts.

Tuigamala completed season two of Match Fit to regain match fitness after suffering from sleep apnoea and type II diabetes, which was reversed by late 2021, and in the second season in 2021/22, he revealed he had adopted a plant-based diet, and had very healthy blood cholesterol levels. Despite that, he also suffered from gout. By the end of New Zealand's second COVID-19 lockdown, both his and Brad Mika's knees had recovered enough to bike. He was then able to reverse his diabetes. However, he was forced to leave day 2 of the union vs. league multi-sport relay due to a family emergency.

Tuigamala died on 24 February 2022, at the age of 52. At the time of his death, he had high blood pressure and had suffered a stroke in 2013.

In 2025, Tuigamala was posthumously inducted into the Pasifika Rugby Hall of Fame.
