= List of Rugby World Cup try scorers =

This article lists charts each team's try scorers from the first Rugby World Cup to date. The list does not include penalty tries.

Statistics correct after New Zealand vs South Africa, 28 October 2023.

== Argentina ==
7 tries

- Juan José Imhoff

6 tries

- Julián Montoya

4 tries

- Pablo Bouza
- Felipe Contepomi
- Ignacio Corleto
- Martín Gaitán
- Nicolás Sánchez
- Joaquín Tuculet

3 tries

- Lucas Borges
- Mateo Carreras
- Santiago Carreras
- Manuel Contepomi
- Santiago Cordero
- Tomás Cubelli
- Juan Martín Hernández
- Juan Manuel Leguizamón
- Matías Moroni
- Martín Terán

2 tries

- Horacio Agulla
- Diego Albanese
- Federico Martín Aramburú
- Lisandro Arbizu
- Emiliano Boffelli
- Juan Cruz Mallia
- Nicolás Fernández Miranda
- Lucas González Amorosino
- Juan Martín González
- Juan Lanza
- Guido Petti
- Agustín Pichot

1 try

- Patricio Albacete
- Matías Alemanno
- Alejandro Allub
- Gonzalo Bertranou
- Martín Bogado
- Rodrigo Bruni
- Santiago Chocobares
- José Cilley
- Matías Corral
- Agustín Creevy
- Rodrigo Crexell
- Jeronimo de la Fuente
- Julio Farías Cabello
- Santiago Fernández
- Juan Fernández Miranda
- Genaro Fessia
- Juan Figallo
- Hernán García Simón
- Fabio Gómez
- Agustín Gosio
- Omar Hasan
- Facundo Isa
- Rodrigo Isgro
- Martín Landajo
- Tomás Lavanini
- Gonzalo Longo
- Rolando Martín
- Federico Méndez
- Lucas Noguera Paz
- Patricio Noriega
- Juan Pablo Orlandi
- Rodrigo Roncero
- Ignacio Ruiz
- Joel Sclavi
- Leonardo Senatore
- Gonzalo Tiesi
- Federico Todeschini

== Australia ==
14 tries

- Drew Mitchell

12 tries

- Adam Ashley-Cooper

11 tries

- Chris Latham

10 tries

- David Campese

8 tries

- Matt Giteau

7 tries

- Joe Roff

6 tries

- Matt C. Burke
- Tim Horan
- Lote Tuqiri

5 tries

- Berrick Barnes
- Matt P. Burke
- Tevita Kuridrani
- Stirling Mortlock
- David Pocock
- Mat Rogers

4 tries

- Rocky Elsom
- Marika Koroibete
- Michael Lynagh
- Ben McCalman
- George Smith

3 tries

- George Gregan
- Dane Haylett-Petty
- Michael Hooper
- Toutai Kefu
- Stephen Larkham
- Andrew Slack
- Ben Tune

2 tries

- Ben Donaldson
- David Codey
- Anthony Fainga'a
- Bernard Foley
- Michael Foley
- Adam Freier
- Will Genia
- Peter Grigg
- Phil Kearns
- Tolu Latu
- Andrew Leeds
- David Lyons
- Sean McMahon
- Mark Nawaqanitawase
- Jordan Petaia
- Marty Roebuck
- Brian Smith
- Damian Smith
- Morgan Turinui

1 try

- Ben Alexander
- Richie Arnold
- Al Baxter
- Kurtley Beale
- Angus Bell
- Tony Daly
- Jack Dempsey
- Owen Finegan
- Elton Flatley
- Nathan Grey
- Mark Hartill
- Reece Hodge
- Stephen Hoiles
- Rob Horne
- James Horwill
- Digby Ioane
- Rod Kafer
- Sekope Kepu
- Samu Kerevi
- Jason Little
- Salesi Ma'afu
- Pat McCabe
- Andrew McIntyre
- Fraser McReight
- Stephen Moore
- Dean Mumm
- James O'Connor
- Brett Papworth
- Jeremy Paul
- Simon Poidevin
- Dave Porecki
- John Roe
- Wendell Sailor
- Radike Samo
- Nathan Sharpe
- Rob Simmons
- Peter Slattery
- James Slipper
- Henry Speight
- Tiaan Straaus
- Ilivasi Tabua
- Joe Tomane
- Matt To'omua
- Steve Tuynman
- Suli Vunivalu
- Chris Whitaker
- Nic White
- David Wilson

== Canada ==
6 tries

- D. T. H. van der Merwe

4 tries

- Al Charron
- Morgan Williams

3 tries

- Rod Snow

2 tries

- Aaron Carpenter
- Phil Mackenzie
- Kyle Nichols
- Pat Palmer
- Ryan Smith
- Winston Stanley
- Conor Trainor
- Paul Vaesen

1 try

- Aaron Abrams
- Mark Cardinal
- Andrew Coe
- Jamie Cudmore
- Craig Culpan
- Glen Ennis
- Matt Evans
- Sean Fauth
- Rob Frame
- Quentin Fyffe
- Jeff Hassler
- Matt Heaton
- Mike James
- Colin McKenzie
- Gordon McKinnon
- Ander Monro
- Pat Riordan
- Robert Ross
- Jebb Sinclair
- Scott Stewart
- Ian Stuart
- Kevin Tkachuk
- Chris Tynan
- Mark Wyatt

== Chile ==
1 try

- Matias Dittus
- Tomás Dussaillant
- Alfonso Escobar
- Rodrigo Fernández

== Ivory Coast ==
1 try

- Aboubakar Camara
- Alfred Okou
- Aboubacar Soulama

== England ==
11 tries

- Rory Underwood

7 tries

- Will Greenwood

6 tries

- Chris Ashton
- Josh Lewsey
- Dan Luger
- Manu Tuilagi

5 tries

- Henry Arundell
- Neil Back
- Mike Harrison
- Jason Robinson

4 tries

- Will Carling
- Mark Cueto
- Jeremy Guscott
- Jonny May
- Jack Nowell
- Paul Sackey
- Anthony Watson

3 tries

- Iain Balshaw
- Martin Corry
- Luke Cowan-Dickie
- Theo Dan
- Nick Easter
- Phil Greening
- Ben Youngs

2 tries

- Mike Brown
- Mike Catt
- Ben Cohen
- Joe Cokanasiga
- Matt Dawson
- Phil de Glanville
- Ben Foden
- George Ford
- Andy Gomarsall
- Shontayne Hape
- Austin Healey
- Richard Hill
- Lewis Ludlam
- Joe Marchant
- Matt Perry
- Marcus Smith
- Tony Underwood
- Billy Vunipola
- Peter Winterbottom

1 try

- Stuart Abbott
- Delon Armitage
- Olly Barkley
- Nick Beal
- Danny Care
- Ollie Chessum
- Tom Croft
- Lawrence Dallaglio
- Elliot Daly
- Matt Dawson
- Wade Dooley
- Ben Earl
- Andy Farrell
- Jamie George
- Nigel Heslop
- Courtney Lawes
- Ruaridh McConnochie
- Lewis Moody
- Nigel Redman
- Gary Rees
- Tom Rees
- Mark Regan
- Dean Richards
- Bevan Rodd
- Jamie Salmon
- Kevin Simms
- Kyle Sinckler
- Micky Skinner
- Henry Slade
- Freddie Steward
- Mathew Tait
- Steve Thompson
- Mike Tindall
- Phil Vickery
- Jonathan Webb
- Jonny Wilkinson
- Jack Willis

== Fiji ==
5 tries

- Vereniki Goneva

4 tries

- Waisea Nayacalevu
- Viliame Satala
- Josua Tuisova

3 tries

- Rupeni Caucaunibuca
- Vilimoni Delasau
- Fero Lasagavibau
- Kele Leawere
- Akapusi Qera

2 tries

- Mesake Doge
- Norman Ligairi
- Nikola Matawalu
- Kini Murimurivalu
- Nemani Nadolo
- Apisai Naevo
- Salacieli Naivilawasa
- Leone Nakarawa
- Semi Radradra
- Api Ratuniyarawa
- Kameli Ratuvou
- Imanueli Tiko
- Aisea Tuilevu
- Marika Vunibaka

1 try

- Levani Botia
- Vilimoni Botitu
- Jioji Cama
- Tevita Cavubati
- Jimi Damu
- Graham Dewes
- Mesu Dolokoto
- Peceli Gale
- Vinaya Habosi
- Emori Katalau
- Nemia Kenatale
- Semi Kunatani
- Frank Lomani
- Viliame Mata
- Eroni Mawi
- Alfie Mocelutu
- Meli Nakauta
- Kavekini Nalaga
- Napolioni Nalaga
- Pita Naruma
- Isoa Neivua
- Manasa Qoro
- Seru Rabeni
- Aca Ratuva
- Jacob Rauluni
- Peni Ravai
- Ilaitia Savai
- Greg Smith
- Lekima Tagitagivalu
- Netani Talei
- Seta Tawake
- Alfred Uluinayau
- Ben Volavola
- Peceli Yato

== France ==
11 tries

- Vincent Clerc

8 tries

- Christophe Dominici

6 tries

- Jean-Baptiste Lafond
- Émile Ntamack
- Damian Penaud

5 tries

- Didier Camberabero
- Philippe Saint-André
- Philippe Sella

4 tries

- Philippe Bernat-Salles
- Louis Bielle-Biarrey
- Denis Charvet
- Yannick Jauzion
- Thierry Lacroix
- Patrice Lagisquet
- Lionel Nallet
- Laurent Rodriguez

3 tries

- Thierry Dusautoir
- Gaël Fickou
- Imanol Harinordoquy
- Brian Liebenberg
- Peato Mauvaka
- Rodolphe Modin
- Ugo Mola
- Charles Ollivon

2 tries

- Cyril Baille
- Pierre Berbizier
- Serge Betsen
- Serge Blanco
- Julien Bonnaire
- Sébastien Chabal
- Jean-Jacques Crenca
- Jonathan Danty
- Richard Dourthe
- Antoine Dupont
- Wesley Fofana
- Xavier Garbajosa
- Sofiane Guitoune
- Raphaël Ibañez
- Melvyn Jaminet
- Guy Laporte
- Alain Lorieux
- Olivier Magne
- Frédéric Michalak
- Yoram Moefana
- Yannick Nyanga
- Pascal Papé
- Clément Poitrenaud
- Alivereti Raka
- Aurélien Rougerie
- Olivier Roumat
- Rabah Slimani
- François Trinh-Duc
- Virimi Vakatawa

1 try

- Guy Accoceberry
- Marc Andrieu
- Lionel Beauxis
- Abdelatif Benazzi
- Yannick Bru
- Sébastien Bruno
- Nicolas Brusque
- Thomas Castaignède
- Arnaud Costes
- Baptiste Couilloud
- Daniel Dubroca
- Pépito Elhorga
- Jean-Baptiste Élissalde
- Dominique Erbani
- Patrick Estève
- Thibaud Flament
- Fabien Galthié
- Stéphane Glas
- Rémy Grosso
- Guilhem Guirado
- Antoine Hastoy
- Cédric Heymans
- Aubin Hueber
- Yoann Huget
- Matthieu Jalibert
- Christophe Juillet
- Christophe Lamaison
- Rémy Martin
- David Marty
- Nicolas Mas
- Maxime Médard
- Maxime Mermoz
- Pierre Mignoni
- Morgan Parra
- Fabien Pelous
- Louis Picamoles
- Julien Pierre
- Jefferson Poirot
- Jean-Baptiste Poux
- Thomas Ramos
- Baptiste Serin
- William Téchoueyres
- Damien Traille
- Sébastien Vahaamahina
- Sébastien Viars

== Georgia ==
4 tries

- Mamuka Gorgodze

2 tries

- Levan Chilachava
- Sandro Todua

1 try

- Dimitri Basilaia
- Jaba Bregvadze
- David Dadunashvili
- Beka Gigashvili
- Akvsenti Giorgadze
- Otar Giorgadze
- Luka Ivanishvili
- David Kacharava
- Vano Karkadze
- Lasha Khmaladze
- Giorgi Kveseladze
- Irakli Machkhaneli
- Zviad Maissuradze
- Lasha Malaghuradze
- Shalva Mamukashvili
- Davit Niniashvili
- Merab Sharikadze
- Giorgi Shkinin
- Aka Tabutsadze
- Giorgi Tkhilaishvili
- Beka Tsiklauri
- Tengiz Zamtaradze

== Ireland ==
8 tries

- Keith Earls

7 tries

- Brian O'Driscoll

6 tries

- Rob Kearney
- Johnny Sexton

5 tries

- Bundee Aki
- Keith Wood

4 tries

- Rory Best
- Tommy Bowe
- Hugo MacNeill
- Brian Robinson

3 tries

- Tadhg Beirne
- Andrew Conway
- Denis Hickie
- Hugo Keenan
- Brendan Mullin
- Peter O'Mahony
- Nick Popplewell
- Alan Quinlan
- Garry Ringrose

2 tries

- David Corkery
- Keith Crossan
- Girvan Dempsey
- Eric Elwood
- Tadhg Furlong
- Simon Geoghegan
- Jamison Gibson-Park
- Eddie Halvey
- Mack Hansen
- Iain Henderson
- Rob Herring
- Shane Horgan
- James Lowe
- Noel Mannion
- Denis McBride
- Eric Miller
- Seán O'Brien
- Conor O'Shea
- Andrew Trimble

1 try

- Justin Bishop
- Isaac Boss
- Michael Bradley
- Tony Buckley
- Caelan Doris
- Victor Costello
- Seán Cronin
- David Curtis
- Guy Easterby
- Simon Easterby
- Luke Fitzgerald
- Jerry Flannery
- Neil Francis
- Gary Halpin
- Gordon Hamilton
- Chris Henry
- Robbie Henshaw
- Niall Hogan
- Marcus Horan
- David Humphreys
- Shane Jennings
- David Kearney
- John Kelly
- Michael Kiernan
- Jordan Larmour
- Kevin Maggs
- Joe McCarthy
- Fergus McFadden
- Geordan Murphy
- Jordi Murphy
- Conor Murray
- Dion O'Cuinneagain
- Patrick O'Hara
- Jared Payne
- James Ryan
- Trevor Ringland
- Rhys Ruddock
- Dan Sheehan
- Brian Spillane
- CJ Stander
- Jim Staples
- Thomas Tierney
- Andrew Ward

== Italy ==
5 tries

- Marcello Cuttitta

4 tries

- Paolo Vaccari

3 tries

- Sergio Parisse

2 tries

- Tommaso Allan
- Mattia Bellini
- Tommaso Benvenuti
- Lorenzo Cannone
- Ange Capuozzo
- Dennis Dallan
- Diego Dominguez
- Edoardo Gori
- Monty Ioane
- Andrea Masi
- Matteo Minozzi
- Giulio Toniolatti
- Alessandro Zanni
- Manuel Zuliani

1 try

- Stefano Barba
- Mauro Bergamasco
- Mirco Bergamasco
- Massimo Bonomi
- Juan Ignacio Brex
- Dean Budd
- Carlo Canna
- Martin Castrogiovanni
- Giancarlo Cucchiella
- Massimo Cuttitta
- Manuel Dallan
- Santiago Dellapè
- Hame Faiva
- Ivan Francescato
- Fabio Gaetaniello
- Paolo Garbisi
- Gonzalo Garcia
- Mario Gerosa
- Marzio Innocenti
- Michele Lamaro
- Dino Lamb
- Massimo Mascioletti
- Luke McLean
- Alessandro Moscardi
- Sebastian Negri
- Paolo Odogwu
- Luciano Orquera
- Lorenzo Pani
- Matthew Phillips
- Jake Polledri
- Michele Rizzo
- Leonardo Sarto
- Marko Stanojevic
- Braam Steyn
- Tito Tebaldi
- Alessandro Troncon
- Giovanbattista Venditti
- Federico Zani

== Japan ==
6 tries

- Kotaro Matsushima

4 tries

- Kenki Fukuoka
- Eiji Kutsuki
- Michael Leitch

3 tries

- Kosuke Endo
- Amato Fakatava
- Hiroyuki Kajihara
- Daisuke Ohata
- Hirotoki Onozawa
- Yoshihito Yoshida

2 tries

- James Arlidge
- Kazuki Himeno
- Lappies Labuschagne
- Amanaki Mafi
- Terunori Masuho
- Jone Naikabula
- Osamu Ota
- Nofomuli Taumoefolau
- Luke Thompson

1 try

- Warner Dearns
- Tsuyoshi Fujita
- Yoshikazu Fujita
- Ayumu Goromaru
- Kensuke Hatakeyama
- Toshiyuki Hayashi
- Karne Hesketh
- Seiji Hirao
- Shota Horie
- Masami Horikoshi
- Takahiro Hosokawa
- Keita Inagaki
- Ko Izawa
- George Konia
- Toru Kurihara
- Timothy Lafaele
- Sinali Latu
- Ekeroma Luaiufi
- Katsuhiro Matsuo
- Andrew Miller
- Katsufumi Miyamoto
- Ryōto Nakamura
- Naoto Saito
- Tomokazu Soma
- Koji Taira
- Masanori Takura
- Patiliai Tuidraki
- Alisi Tupuailei
- Akihito Yamada
- Kojiro Yoshinaga

== Namibia ==
3 tries

- JC Greyling

2 tries

- Jacques Burger
- Heinz Koll
- Theuns Kotzé
- Gerswin Mouton
- Johann Tromp

1 try

- Chrysander Botha
- Johan Deysel
- du Preez Grobler
- Quinton Hough
- Hakkies Husselman
- Eben Isaacs
- Mario Jacobs
- Eugene Jantjies
- Bradley Langenhoven
- Jacques Nieuwenhuis
- Chad Plato
- Corne Powell
- Arthur Samuelson
- Johannes Senekal
- Damian Stevens
- Danie van Wyk
- Piet van Zyl

== New Zealand ==
15 tries

- Jonah Lomu

13 tries

- Doug Howlett

11 tries

- Joe Rokocoko

9 tries

- Mils Muliaina
- Jeff Wilson

8 tries

- Will Jordan
- Julian Savea

7 tries

- Beauden Barrett
- Marc Ellis
- John Kirwan
- Aaron Smith

6 tries

- Craig Green
- Jerome Kaino
- Nehe Milner-Skudder
- Ma'a Nonu
- Ben Smith
- Sonny Bill Williams

5 tries

- Israel Dagg
- Leicester Fainga'anuku
- John Gallagher
- David Kirk
- Leon MacDonald
- Damian McKenzie
- Glen Osborne
- Alan Whetton

4 tries

- Jordie Barrett
- Zac Guildford
- Richard Kahui
- Josh Kronfeld
- Anton Lienert-Brown
- Walter Little
- Aaron Mauger
- Caleb Ralph
- Ardie Savea
- Sitiveni Sivivatu
- Conrad Smith
- Carlos Spencer
- Isaia Toeava

3 tries

- Zinzan Brooke
- Dane Coles
- Jerry Collins
- Shannon Frizell
- Andrew Hore
- Michael Jones
- Byron Kelleher
- Richie McCaw
- Kieran Read
- Cam Roigard
- Eric Rush
- Rodney So'oialo
- Joe Stanley
- Mark Tele'a
- Brad Thorn
- John Timu
- Victor Vito
- Ali Williams
- Terry Wright

2 tries

- Scott Barrett
- George Bridge
- Robin Brooke
- Frank Bunce
  - Bunce also scored one try for Samoa.
- Sam Cane
- Dan Carter
- Andy Earl
- Andy Ellis
- Nick Evans
- Malakai Fekitoa
- Craig Innes
- Rieko Ioane
- Chris Jack
- Tawera Kerr-Barlow
- Chris Masoe
- Keven Mealamu
- Kees Meeuws
- Joe Moody
- Richie Mo'unga
- Dalton Papalii
- Sevu Reece
- Brodie Retallick
- Buck Shelford
- Codie Taylor
- Adam Thomson
- Reuben Thorne
- Va'aiga Tuigamala
- Tana Umaga
- Brad Weber
- Tony Woodcock

1 try

- Graeme Bachop
- Daniel Braid
- Mark Brooke-Cowden
- Tony Brown
- Caleb Clarke
- Jimmy Cowan
- Ryan Crotty
- Kieran Crowley
- Simon Culhane
- Christian Cullen
- Ethan de Groot
- Craig Dowd
- John Drake
- Sean Fitzpatrick
- Corey Flynn
- Daryl Gibson
- Mark Hammett
- David Havili
- Carl Hayman
- Paul Henderson
- Jason Hewett
- Marty Holah
- Alama Ieremia
- Cory Jane
- Richard Loe
- Brendon Leonard
- Justin Marshall
- Norm Maxwell
- Luke McAlister
- Bernie McCahill
- Steve McDowall
- Andrew Mehrtens
- Dylan Mika
- Waisake Naholo
- Fletcher Newell
- TJ Perenara
- Graham Purvis
- Taine Randell
- Scott Robertson
- Colin Slade
- Angus Ta'avao
- Warwick Taylor
- Matt Todd
- Sam Whitelock
- Tamaiti Williams

== Portugal ==
3 try

- Raffaele Storti

1 try

- Pedro Bettencourt
- Pedro Carvalho
- Rui Cordeiro
- Francisco Fernandes
- Joaquim Ferreira
- Rodrigo Marta
- Nicolas Martins
- David Penalva
- Rafael Simões

== Romania ==
3 tries

- Marius Țincu

2 tries

- Adrian Apostol
- Mihai Macovei
- Florica Murariu
- Catalin Sasu
- Cristian Săuan
- Marcel Toader

1 try

- Cristi Boboc
- Daniel Carpo
- Ionel Cazan
- George Chiriac
- Florin Corodeanu
- Tudor Constantin
- Haralambie Dumitraș
- Andrei Gurănescu
- Liviu Hodorcă
- Gheorghe Ion
- Mihăiță Lazăr
- Adrian Lungu
- Valentin Maftei
- Mircea Paraschiv
- Alin Petrache
- Augustin Petrechei
- Valentin Popârlan
- Gabriel Rupanu
- Marius Simionescu
- Lucian Sîrbu
- Gheorghe Solomie
- Florin Surugiu
- Ion Teodorescu
- Petrișor Toderașc
- Ovidiu Tonița
- Valentin Ursache

== Russia ==
2 tries

- Vladimir Ostroushko
- Denis Simplikevich

1 try

- Vasili Artemyev
- Kirill Golosnitsky
- Alexey Makovetskiy
- Konstantin Rachkov
- Alexander Yanyushkin

== Samoa ==
Including Western Samoa, 1991-95.

10 tries

- Brian Lima

4 tries

- Alesana Tuilagi

3 tries

- Stephen Bachop
- George Harder
- Sama Malolo
- Semo Sititi

2 tries

- Nigel Ah Wong
- Maurie Fa'asavalu
- Lome Fa'atau
- Dominic Fe'aunati
- Ed Fidow
- Kahn Fotuali'i
- Silao Leaega
- Pat Lam
- Rey Lee-Lo
- Alapati Leiua
- Duncan Paia'aua
- Opeta Palepoi
- Fata Sini
- Afato So'oalo
- George Stowers
- Timo Tagaloa
- Sailosi Tagicakibau
- Shem Tatupu

1 try

- Afa Amosa
- Frank Bunce
  - Bunce also scored two tries for New Zealand.
- Lio Falaniko
- Darren Kellett
- Jack Lam
- Seilala Lam
- Christian Leali'ifano
- George Leaupepe
- Fritz Lee
- Manu Leiataua
- Simon Lemalu
- Motu Matu'u
- Tim Nanai-Williams
- Tu Nu'uali'itia
- Peter Paramore
- Anthony Perenise
- Paul Perez
- Tusi Pisi
- Junior Polu
- Steve So'oialo
- Henry Taefu
- Jonathan Taumateine
- Kane Thompson
- Ofisa Treviranus
- Mike Umaga
- Earl Va'a
- Sila Vaifale
- To'o Vaega
- Tanner Vili
- Gavin Williams
- Paul Williams

== Scotland ==
9 tries

- Gavin Hastings

7 tries

- Iwan Tukalo

6 tries

- John Jeffrey

5 tries

- Simon Danielli
- Darcy Graham
- Scott Hastings
- Tommy Seymour
- Alan Tait

4 tries

- Matt Duncan
- George Horne
- Chris Paterson
- Tony Stanger

3 tries

- Mark Bennett
- Ally Hogg
- Rory Lamont
- Martin Leslie
- Cameron Murray
- Doddie Weir
- Derek White

2 tries

- Gary Armstrong
- Craig Chalmers
- Rory Darge
- John Hardie
- Adam Hastings
- Greig Laidlaw
- Kenny Logan
- Sean Maitland
- Cameron Mather
- WP Nel
- Iain Paxton
- Ali Price
- Finn Russell
- Robbie Russell
- Graham Shiel
- Gregor Townsend
- George Turner
- Peter Walton

1 try

- Joe Ansbro
- Ewan Ashman
- John Barclay
- Mike Blair
- Kelly Brown
- Paul Burnell
- Chris Cusiter
- Rob Dewey
- Matt Fagerson
- Zander Fagerson
- Ross Ford
- Stuart Grimes
- Chris Harris
- Ben Healy
- Duncan Hodge
- Peter Horne
- Gavin Kerr
- Blair Kinghorn
- Scott Lawson
- Shaun Longstaff
- Johnny Matthews
- Stuart McInally
- James McLaren
- Glenn Metcalfe
- Greig Oliver
- Dan Parks
- Eric Peters
- Budge Pountney
- Matt Scott
- Gordon Simpson
- Ollie Smith
- Tom Smith
- Hugo Southwell
- Kyle Steyn
- Simon Taylor
- Derek Turnbull
- Duhan van der Merwe
- Tim Visser
- Rob Wainwright
- Hamish Watson
- Duncan Weir
- Peter Wright

== South Africa ==
15 tries

- Bryan Habana

9 tries

- Jaque Fourie
- Makazole Mapimpi
- JP Pietersen

7 tries

- Cobus Reinach

6 tries

- Danie Rossouw
- Joost van der Westhuizen

5 tries

- Cheslin Kolbe
- Juan Smith
- François Steyn

4 tries

- Schalk Burger
- Damian de Allende
- Francois Louw
- Adriaan Richter
- Chester Williams

3 tries

- Bakkies Botha
- Schalk Brits
- Fourie du Preez
- Francois Hougaard
- Bongi Mbonambi
- Joe van Niekerk

2 tries

- Lukhanyo Am
- Gio Aplon
- Kurt-Lee Arendse
- Juan de Jongh
- Bismarck du Plessis
- Pieter-Steph du Toit
- Eben Etzebeth
- Robbie Fleck
- Deon Fourie
- Warrick Gelant
- Derick Hougaard
- Deon Kayser
- Jesse Kriel
- Willie le Roux
- Percy Montgomery
- Ruan Pienaar
- Bob Skinstad
- RG Snyman
- Morné Steyn
- Albert van den Berg
- André Vos
- Damian Willemse
- Grant Williams

1 try

- Mark Andrews
- Richard Bands
- Lood de Jager
- Faf de Klerk
- Neil de Kock
- Thinus Delport
- Werner Greeff
- Pieter Hendriks
- Butch James
- Siya Kolisi
- Ruben Kruger
- Anton Leonard
- Ollie le Roux
- Frans Malherbe
- Malcolm Marx
- Canan Moodie
- Tendai Mtawarira
- Jorrie Müller
- Pieter Muller
- Lwazi Mvovo
- S'busiso Nkosi
- Breyton Paulse
- Chris Rossouw
- Pieter Rossouw
- Hendro Scholtz
- John Smit
- Kwagga Smith
- Gurthrö Steenkamp
- Joel Stransky
- Adriaan Strauss
- Werner Swanepoel
- CJ van der Linde
- Jaco van der Westhuyzen
- Marco van Staden
- Andre Venter
- Brendan Venter
- Ashwin Willemse

== Spain ==
No tries scored.

== Tonga ==
5 tries

- Telusa Veainu

3 tries

- Suka Hufanga
- Solomone Kata
- Siale Piutau

2 tries

- Mali Hingano
- Pierre Hola
- Benhur Kivalu
- Jack Ram
- Ben Tameifuna
- Sateki Tuipulotu
- Fetuʻu Vainikolo
- Viliami Vaki

1 try

- Pita Ahki
- Isileli Fatani
- Ipolito Fenukitau
- Quddus Fielea
- Talai Fifita
- Vaea Fifita
- Siegfried Fisi'ihoi
- Latiume Fosita
- Fine Inisi
- Zane Kapeli
- Pouvalu Latukefu
- Heamani Lavaka
- Tukulua Lokotui
- Viliami Maʻafu
- Finau Maka
- George Moala
- Kurt Morath
- Mana Otai
- John Payne
- Patrick Pellegrini
- Kisi Pulu
- Hale T-Pole
- Epi Taione
- Sonatane Takulua
- Taunaholo Taufahema
- Sona Taumalolo
- Kyren Taumoefolau
- Afusipa Taumoepeau
- Dave Tiueti
- Soane Tongaʻuiha
- Tevita Tuʻifua
- Tevita Vaʻenuku
- Sione Vailanu
- Joseph Vaka
- Fakahau Valu

== Uruguay ==
3 tries

- Baltazar Amaya

2 tries

- Santiago Arata
- Alfonso Cardoso
- Manuel Diana
- Nicolás Freitas
- German Kessler
- Pablo Lemoine

1 try

- Carlos Arboleya
- Bautista Basso
- Nicolas Brignoni
- Rodrigo Capó
- Juan Manuel Cat
- Diego Lamelas
- Juan Menchaca
- Agustín Ormaechea
- Diego Ormaechea
- Andres Vilaseca

== United States ==
4 tries

- Chris Wyles

3 tries

- Ray Nelson
- Riaan van Zyl
- Takudzwa Ngwenya

2 tries

- Mike Hercus
- Mike Purcell
- Kort Schubert
- Blaine Scully
- Louis Stanfill
- Mike Te'o

1 try

- Chris Baumann
- Bryce Campbell
- Kevin Dalzell
- Philip Eloff
- Paul Emerick
- JJ Gagiano
- Juan Grobler
- Brian Hightower
- Kirk Khasigian
- Gary Lambert
- Tony Lamborn
- Titi Lamositele
- Paul Lasike
- Dan Lyle
- Mike MacDonald
- Matekitonga Moeakiola
- Mike Petri
- Kurt Shuman
- Kevin Swords

== Wales ==
10 tries

- Shane Williams

8 tries

- Josh Adams
- Gareth Davies

7 tries

- Ieuan Evans
- Gareth Thomas

6 tries

- George North

5 tries

- Colin Charvis
- Louis Rees-Zammit
- Martyn Williams

4 tries

- Jonathan Davies
- Sonny Parker
- Mark Taylor
- Scott Williams

3 tries

- Cory Allen
- Gareth Cooper
- John Devereux
- Taulupe Faletau
- Adrian Hadley
- Alun Wyn Jones
- Mark Jones
- Mike Phillips
- Glen Webbe
- Liam Williams
- Tomos Williams

2 tries

- Hallam Amos
- Leigh Halfpenny
- Jac Morgan
- Gareth Roberts
- Jamie Roberts
- Hemi Taylor
- Justin Tipuric
- Lloyd Williams

1 try

- Paul Arnold
- Scott Baldwin
- Allan Bateman
- Dan Biggar
- Bleddyn Bowen
- Aled Brew
- Lloyd Burns
- Lee Byrne
- Elliot Dee
- Arthur Emyr
- Tomas Francis
- Scott Gibbs
- James Hook
- Shane Howarth
- Robert Howley
- Jonathan Humphreys
- Dafydd James
- Gethin Jenkins
- Dafydd Jones
- Robert Jones
- Stephen Jones
- Dewi Lake
- Samson Lee
- David Llewellyn
- Andy Moore
- Kevin Morgan
- Paul Moriarty
- Ross Moriarty
- Hadleigh Parkes
- Alan Phillips
- Alix Popham
- Mark Ring
- Nicky Smith
- Jonathan Thomas
- T. Rhys Thomas
- Nick Tompkins
- Aaron Wainwright
- Sam Warburton

== Zimbabwe ==
3 tries

- Richard Tsimba

2 tries

- Adrian Garvey

1 try

- Dirk Buitendag
- Brendon Dawson
- Peter Kaulbach
- Mark Neill
- Honeywell Nguruve
- William Schultz
- Conor Shearer
