= Samoa at the Rugby World Cup =

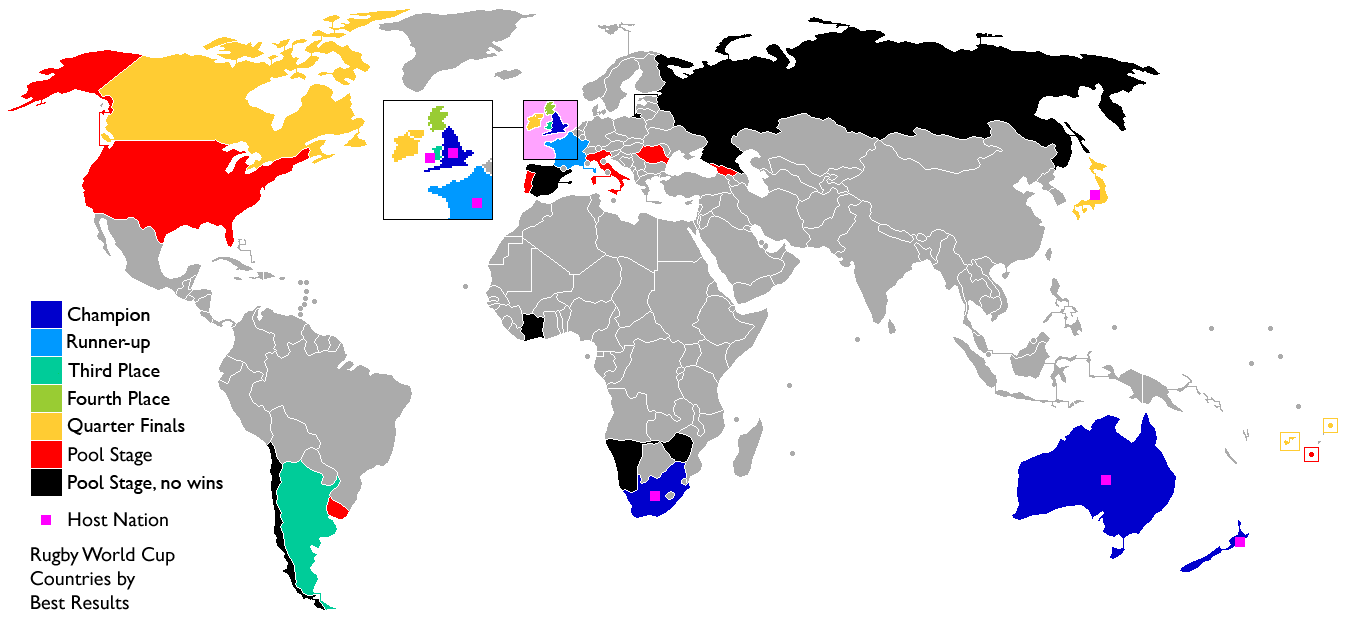
Map of nations best results, excluding nations which unsuccessfully participated in qualifying tournaments.

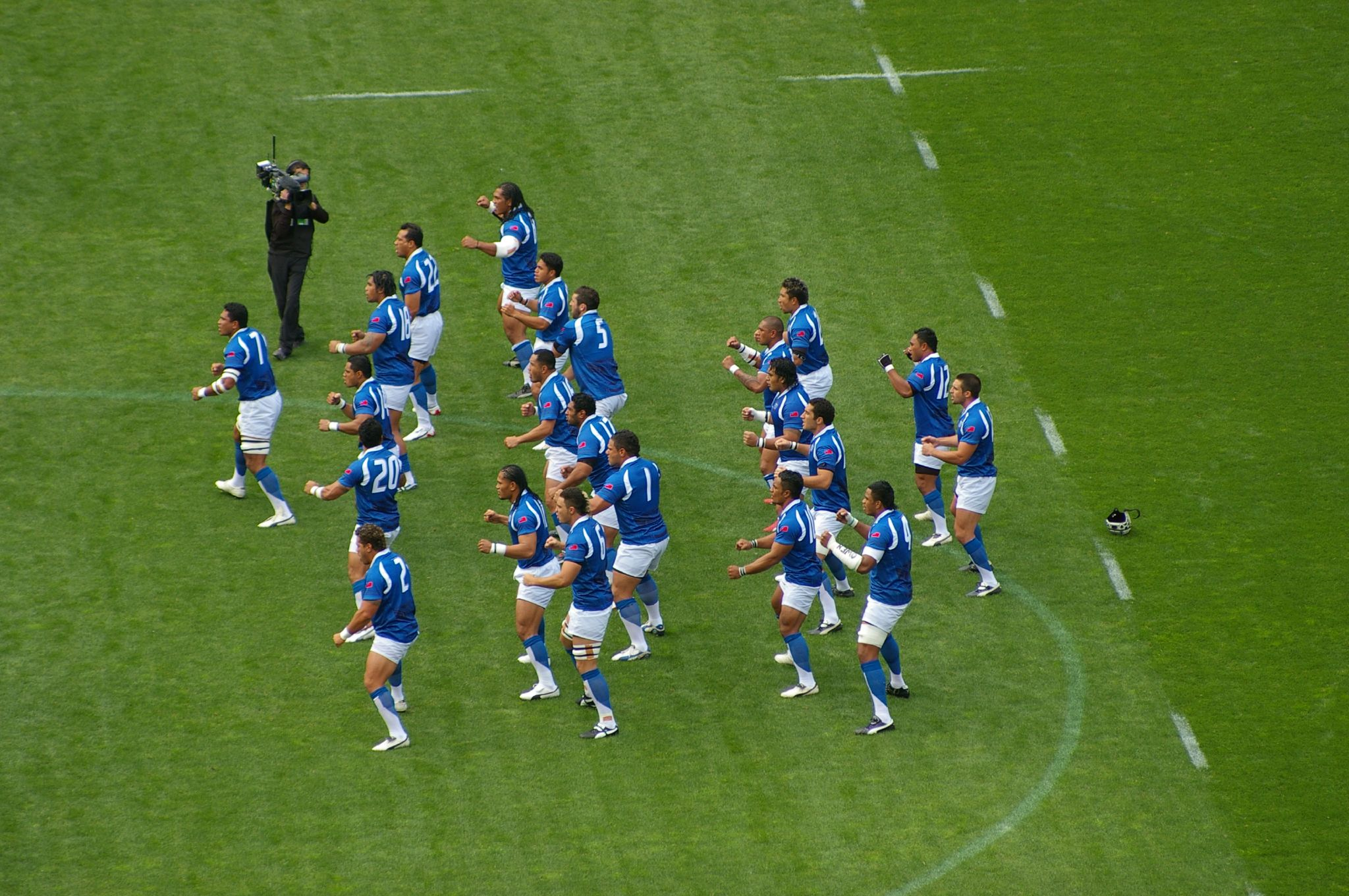
Samoa performing their Siva Tau before playing South Africa at the 2007 Rugby World Cup

Samoa (known as Western Samoa until 1997) have played in every Rugby World Cup since the 1991 tournament. Their omission from the inaugural tournament in 1987 was controversial, as there were no qualifications. Their worst World Cups were in 2007, 2015 and 2019 when they finished fourth in their pool.

Nation	Number of appearances	First appearance	Most recent appearance	Streak	Best result
Samoa	9	1991	2023	9	Quarter finals, 1991, 1995

== By position ==
Rugby World Cup record									Qualification						
Year	Round	Pld	W	D	L	PF	PA	Squad	Pos	Pld	W	D	L	PF	PA
(New Zealand) (Australia) 1987	Not invited								Not invited						
(England) (France) (Ireland) (Scotland) (Wales) 1991	Quarter-finals	4	2	0	2	60	72	Squad	1st	3	3	0	0	123	21
(South Africa) 1995	Quarter-finals	4	2	0	2	110	130	Squad	Automatically qualified						
(Wales) 1999	QF play-offs	4	2	0	2	117	107	Squad	3rd	3	1	0	2	59	71
(Australia) 2003	Pool stage	4	2	0	2	138	117	Squad	2nd	4	3	0	1	96	58
(France) 2007	Pool stage	4	2	0	2	69	143	Squad	1st	4	3	0	1	133	78
(New Zealand) 2011	Pool stage	4	2	0	2	91	49	Squad	P/O	2	2	0	0	188	19
(England) 2015	Pool stage	4	1	0	3	69	124	Squad	Automatically qualified						
(Japan) 2019	Pool stage	4	1	0	3	58	128	Squad	P/O	6	3	0	3	167	132
(France) 2023	Pool stage	4	1	0	3	92	75	Squad	P/O	2	2	0	0	79	28
(Australia) 2027	Qualified								P/O	8	2	2	4	175	182
(United States) 2031	To be determined														
Total	—	36	15	0	21	804	977	—	—	32	19	2	11	990	572
Champions; Runners–up; Third place; Fourth place; Home venue

== By match ==
=== 1991 Rugby World Cup ===
Pool 3 matches –

Team	Pld	W	D	L	PF	PA	PD	Pts
Australia	3	3	0	0	79	25	+54	6
Western Samoa	3	2	0	1	54	34	+20	4
Wales	3	1	0	2	32	61	−29	2
Argentina	3	0	0	3	38	83	−45	0

6 October 1991

Wales	13–16	Western Samoa
Try: Emyr; Evans; Con: Ring; Pen: Ring		Try: Vaega; Vaifale; Con: Vaea; Pen: Vaea (2)

Cardiff Arms Park, Cardiff
Referee: Patrick Robin (France)

9 October 1991

Australia	9–3	Western Samoa
Pen: Lynagh (3)		Pen: Vaea

Pontypool Park, Pontypool
Referee: Ed Morrison (England)

13 October 1991

Argentina	12–35	Western Samoa
Try: Teran; Con: Arbizu; Pen: Laborde; Arbizu		Try: Tagaola (2); Lima (2); Bunce; Bachop; Con: Vaea (4); Pen: Vaea

Sardis Road, Pontypridd
Referee: Brian Anderson (Scotland)

Quarter final

19 October 1991

Scotland	28–6	Western Samoa
Try: Jeffrey (2); Stanger; Con: Hastings (2); Pen: Hastings (4)		Pen: Vaea; Drop: Bachop

Murrayfield Stadium, Edinburgh
Referee: Derek Bevan (Wales)

=== 1995 Rugby World Cup ===
Pool B games –

Team	Pld	W	D	L	PF	PA	PD	Pts
England	3	3	0	0	95	60	+35	9
Western Samoa	3	2	0	1	96	88	+8	7
Italy	3	1	0	2	69	94	−25	5
Argentina	3	0	0	3	69	87	−18	3

27 May 1995

Italy	18–42	Western Samoa
Try: Vaccari; Cuttitta; Con: Dominguez; Pen: Dominguez; Drop: Dominguez	Report	Try: Lima (2); Harder (2); Kellett; Tatupu; Con: Kellett (3); Pen: Kellett (2)

Basil Kenyon Stadium, East London
Attendance: 11,000
Referee: Joel Dume (France)

30 May 1995

Western Samoa	32–26	Argentina
Try: Lam; Leaupepe; Harder; Con: Kellett; Pen: Kellett (5)		Try: Penalty try Crexell; Con: Cilley (2); Pen: Cilley (4)

Basil Kenyon Stadium, East London
Attendance: 11,000
Referee: Dave Bishop (New Zealand)

4 June 1995

England	44–22	Western Samoa
Try: Underwood (2); Back; Con: Callard; Pen: Callard; Drop: Catt		Try: Sini (2); Umaga; Con: Fa'amasino (2); Pen: Fa'amasino

Kings Park Stadium, Durban
Attendance: 20,000
Referee: Patrick Robin (France)

Quarter-finals –

10 June 1995

South Africa	42–14	Western Samoa
Try: Williams (4); Rossouw; Andrews; Con: Johnson (3); Pen: Johnson (2)		Try: Tatupu; Nu'uali'itia; Con: Fa'amasino (2)

Ellis Park, Johannesburg
Attendance: 52,000
Referee: Jim Fleming (Scotland)

=== 1999 Rugby World Cup ===
Qualified for quarter-finals
Qualified for quarter-final play-offs

Pool D games –

Team	Pld	W	D	L	PF	PA	PD	Pts
Wales	3	2	0	1	118	71	+47	7
Samoa	3	2	0	1	97	72	+25	7
Argentina	3	2	0	1	83	51	+32	7
Japan	3	0	0	3	36	140	−104	3

3 October 1999

Samoa	43–9	Japan
Try: Lima (2); So'oalo (2); Leaega; Con: Leaega (3); Pen: Leaega (4)		Pen: Hirose (3)

Racecourse Ground, Wrexham
Referee: Andrew Cole (Australia)

10 October 1999

Argentina	32–16	Samoa
Try: Allub; Pen: Quesada (8); Drop: Quesada		Try: Paramore; Con: Leaega; Pen: Leaega (3)

Stradey Park, Llanelli
Referee: Wayne Erickson (Australia)

14 October 1999

Wales	31–38	Samoa
Try: Thomas; Penalty try (2); Con: Jenkins (2); Pen: Jenkins (4)		Try: Bachop (2); Falaniko; Lam; Leaega; Con: Leaega; Pen: Leaega

Millennium Stadium, Cardiff
Referee: Ed Morrison (England)

Quarter-final playoffs

20 October 1999

Scotland	35–20	Samoa
Try: Murray; Leslie; Con: Logan; Pen: Logan (5); Drop: Townsend		Try: Lima; Sititi; Con: Leaega (2); Pen: Leaega (2)

Murrayfield Stadium, Edinburgh
Attendance: 67,000
Referee: David McHugh (Ireland)

=== 2003 Rugby World Cup ===
Team	Pld	W	D	L	PF	PA	PD	BP	Pts	Qualification
England	4	4	0	0	255	47	+208	3	19	Quarter-finals
South Africa	4	3	0	1	184	60	+124	3	15	Quarter-finals
Samoa	4	2	0	2	138	117	+21	2	10	
Uruguay	4	1	0	3	56	255	−199	0	4	
Georgia	4	0	0	4	46	200	−154	0	0	

15 October 2003

Samoa	60–13	Uruguay
Try: Fa'asavalu (2); Lima (2); Tagicakibau; Fa'atau; Lemalu; Vili; Fe'aunati; Palepoi; Con: Va'a (3); Vili (2)		Try: Capo; Lemoine; Pen: Aguirre

Subiaco Oval, Perth
Attendance: 22,020
Referee: David McHugh (Ireland)

19 October 2003

Georgia	9–46	Samoa
Pen: Jimsheladze (2); Drop: Jimsheladze		Try: Tagicakibau; Va'a; Sititi; So'oialo; Fe'aunati; Lima; Con: Va'a (5); Pen: Va'a (2)

Subiaco Oval, Perth
Attendance: 21,507
Referee: Alain Rolland (Ireland)

26 October 2003

England	35–22	Samoa
Try: Back; Penalty try Balshaw; Vickery; Con: Wilkinson (3); Pen: Wilkinson (2); Drop: Wilkinson		Try: Sititi; Con: Va'a; Pen: Va'a (5)

Telstra Dome, Melbourne
Attendance: 50,647
Referee: Jonathan Kaplan (South Africa)

1 November 2003

South Africa	60–10	Samoa
Try: Van Niekerk; Muller; Hougaard; Smith; Willemse; Fourie; Van der Westhuyzen; De Kock; Con: Hougaard (5); Koen (2); Pen: Hougaard; Drop: Hougaard		Try: Palepoi; Con: Va'a; Pen: Va'a

Suncorp Stadium, Brisbane
Attendance: 48,496
Referee: Chris White (England)

=== 2007 Rugby World Cup ===
Pos	Team	Pld	W	D	L	PF	PA	PD	B	Pts	Qualification
1	South Africa	4	4	0	0	189	47	+142	3	19	Advanced to the quarter-finals and qualified for the 2011 Rugby World Cup
2	England	4	3	0	1	108	88	+20	2	14	Advanced to the quarter-finals and qualified for the 2011 Rugby World Cup
3	Tonga	4	2	0	2	89	96	−7	1	9	Eliminated, automatic qualification for 2011 Rugby World Cup
4	Samoa	4	1	0	3	69	143	−74	1	5	
5	United States	4	0	0	4	61	142	−81	1	1	

9 September 2007
16:00

South Africa	59–7	Samoa
Try: Habana (4) 33' m, 56' c, 66' c, 76' m Montgomery (2) 40+' c, 53' m Fourie 47' c JP Pietersen 80+' c Con: Montgomery (5/8); Pen: Montgomery (3/3) 3', 10', 15'	Report	Try: Williams 18' c Con: Williams (1/1)

Parc des Princes, Paris
Attendance: 46,575
Referee: Paul Honiss (New Zealand)

16 September 2007
16:00

Samoa	15–19	Tonga
Pen: Williams (5/6) 6', 21', 23', 29', 69'	Report	Try: Taione 60' c Con: Hola (1/1); Pen: Hola (4/5) 3', 38', 47', 67'

Stade de la Mosson, Montpellier
Attendance: 24,128
Referee: Jonathan Kaplan (South Africa)

22 September 2007
16:00

England	44–22	Samoa
Try: Corry (2) 2' c, 76' c Sackey (2) 32' c, 80+' m Con: Wilkinson (3/4); Pen: Wilkinson (4/6) 15', 22', 33', 72'; Drop: Wilkinson (2/3) 6', 69'	Report	Try: Polu 47' c Con: Crichton (1/1); Pen: Crichton (5/5) 9', 12', 38', 40+, 42'

Stade de la Beaujoire, Nantes
Attendance: 37,022
Referee: Alan Lewis (Ireland)

26 September 2007
20:00

Samoa	25–21	United States
Try: Fa'atau 5' m Tuilagi 9' c Thompson 37' c Con: Crichton (2/3); Pen: Crichton (2/2) 30', 72'	Report	Try: Ngwenya 53' c Stanfill 79' m Con: Hercus (1/2); Pen: Hercus (3/4) 32', 65', 75'

Stade Geoffroy-Guichard, Saint-Étienne
Attendance: 34,124
Referee: Wayne Barnes (England)

=== 2011 Rugby World Cup ===
Pos	Team	Pld	W	D	L	PF	PA	PD	T	B	Pts	Qualification
1	South Africa	4	4	0	0	166	24	+142	21	2	18	Advanced to the quarter-finals and qualified for the 2015 Rugby World Cup
2	Wales	4	3	0	1	180	34	+146	23	3	15	Advanced to the quarter-finals and qualified for the 2015 Rugby World Cup
3	Samoa	4	2	0	2	91	49	+42	9	2	10	Eliminated but qualified for 2015 Rugby World Cup
4	Fiji	4	1	0	3	59	167	−108	7	1	5	
5	Namibia	4	0	0	4	44	266	−222	5	0	0	

Pool D matches

14 September 2011
14:30

Samoa	49–12	Namibia
Try: Fotuali'i 1' c Tuilagi (3) 17' c, 35' m, 55' c Williams 59' c Penalty try 70' c Con: T. Pisi (2/2); Williams (2/3); Pen: T. Pisi (2/2) 10', 24'; Williams (1/1) 53'	Report	Try: van Wyk 63' m Kotzé 79' c Con: Kotzé (1/2)

Rotorua International Stadium, Rotorua
Attendance: 12,752
Referee: Romain Poite (France)

18 September 2011
15:30

Wales	17–10	Samoa
Try: Williams 67' m Pen: Hook (2/3) 12', 27'; Priestland (2/2) 43', 66'	Report	Try: Perenise 40+' c Con: Williams (1/1); Pen: Williams (1/3) 21'

Waikato Stadium, Hamilton
Attendance: 30,804
Referee: Alain Rolland (Ireland)

25 September 2011
15:30

Fiji	7–27	Samoa
Try: Talei 67' c Con: Luveniyali (1/1)	Report	Try: Fotuali'i 62' m Stowers 70' c Con: Williams (1/1); Pen: Pisi (4/6) 6', 10', 27', 45'; Drop: Pisi (1/2) 12'

Eden Park, Auckland
Attendance: 60,327
Referee: Bryce Lawrence (New Zealand)

30 September 2011
20:30

South Africa	13–5	Samoa
Try: Habana 9' c Con: M. Steyn (1/1); Pen: F. Steyn (1/3) 25'; M. Steyn (1/2) 27'; Drop: M. Steyn (0/1)	Report	Try: Stowers 51' m Con: T. Pisi (0/1)

North Harbour Stadium, Auckland
Attendance: 29,734
Referee: Nigel Owens (Wales)

=== 2015 Rugby World Cup ===
Pos	Team	Pld	W	D	L	PF	PA	PD	T	B	Pts	Qualification
1	South Africa	4	3	0	1	176	56	+120	23	4	16	Advanced to the quarter-finals and qualified for the 2019 Rugby World Cup
2	Scotland	4	3	0	1	136	93	+43	14	2	14	Advanced to the quarter-finals and qualified for the 2019 Rugby World Cup
3	Japan	4	3	0	1	98	100	−2	9	0	12	Eliminated but qualified for 2019 Rugby World Cup
4	Samoa	4	1	0	3	69	124	−55	7	2	6	
5	United States	4	0	0	4	50	156	−106	5	0	0	

20 September 2015	Samoa	25–16	United States	Brighton Community Stadium, Brighton
26 September 2015	South Africa	46–6	Samoa	Villa Park, Birmingham
3 October 2015	Samoa	5–26	Japan	Stadium mk, Milton Keynes
10 October 2015	Samoa	33–36	Scotland	St. James' Park, Newcastle

=== 2019 Rugby World Cup ===
Pos	Team	Pld	W	D	L	PF	PA	PD	T	B	Pts	Qualification
1	Japan	4	4	0	0	115	62	+53	13	3	19	Advanced to the quarter-finals and qualified for the 2023 Rugby World Cup
2	Ireland	4	3	0	1	121	27	+94	18	4	16	Advanced to the quarter-finals and qualified for the 2023 Rugby World Cup
3	Scotland	4	2	0	2	119	55	+64	16	3	11	Eliminated but qualified for 2023 Rugby World Cup
4	Samoa	4	1	0	3	58	128	−70	8	1	5	
5	Russia	4	0	0	4	19	160	−141	1	0	0	

24 September 2019
19:15 JST (UTC+09)

Russia	9–34	Samoa (1 BP)
Pen: Kushnarev (2/2) 19', 26'; Drop: Kushnarev (1/1) 48'	Report	Try: Leiua (2) 16' m, 80' m Amosa 45' m Fidow (2) 49' c, 53' c Lee-Lo 63' m Con: Pisi (2/5) 50', 54'

Kumagaya Rugby Stadium, Kumagaya
Attendance: 22,564
Referee: Romain Poite (France)

30 September 2019
19:15 JST (UTC+09)

(1 BP) Scotland	34–0	Samoa
Try: Maitland 30' c Laidlaw 34' c Penalty try (2) 57', 75'; Con: Laidlaw (2/2) 31', 36'; Pen: Laidlaw (1/1) 9'; Drop: Hogg (1/1) 38'	Report

Kobe Misaki Stadium, Kobe
Attendance: 27,586
Referee: Pascal Gaüzère (France)

5 October 2019
19:30 JST (UTC+09)

(1 BP) Japan	38–19	Samoa
Try: Lafaele 28' c Himeno 53' c Fukuoka 76' m Matsushima 80+5' c Con: Tamura (3/4) 29', 55', 80+7'; Pen: Tamura (4/5) 3', 8', 24', 51'	Report	Try: Taefu 73' c Con: Taefu (1/1) 74'; Pen: Taefu (4/5) 10', 15', 34', 45'

City of Toyota Stadium, Toyota
Attendance: 39,695
Referee: Jaco Peyper (South Africa)

12 October 2019
19:45 JST (UTC+09)

(1 BP) Ireland	47–5	Samoa
Try: Best 4' c Furlong 10' c Sexton (2) 21' c, 39' m Larmour 48' c Stander 65' c Conway 70' c Con: Sexton (4/5) 5', 11', 23', 50; Carbery (2/2) 67', 72'	Report	Try: J. Lam 26' m

Fukuoka Hakatanomori Stadium, Fukuoka
Attendance: 17,967
Referee: Nic Berry (Australia)

=== 2023 Rugby World Cup ===
16 September 2023
15:00 CEST (UTC+2)

(1 BP) Samoa	43–10	Chile
Try: Paia'aua 40+1' c Taumateine 42' m Lee 47' m Malolo (2) 52' c, 80+1' c Con: Leali'ifano (2/4) 40+2', 53'; Sopoaga (1/1) 80+2'; Pen: Leali'ifano (4/4) 4', 10', 14', 36'	Report	Try: Dittus 6' c Con: Videla (1/1) 7'; Pen: Garafulic (1/1) 30'

Nouveau Stade de Bordeaux, Bordeaux
Attendance: 39,291
Referee: Paul Williams (New Zealand)

22 September 2023
17:45 CEST (UTC+2)

Argentina	19–10	Samoa
Try: Boffelli 9' c Con: Boffelli (1/1) 10'; Pen: Boffelli (3/4) 25', 34', 54'; Sánchez (1/1) 80'	Report	Try: Malolo 75' c Con: Leuila (1/1) 75'; Pen: Leali'ifano (1/3) 28'

Stade Geoffroy-Guichard, Saint-Étienne
Attendance: 38,358
Referee: Nic Berry (Australia)

28 September 2023
21:00 CEST (UTC+2)

Japan	28–22	Samoa (1 BP)
Try: Labuschagné 13' c Leitch 32' c Himeno 48' m Con: Matsuda (2/3) 15', 33'; Pen: Matsuda (3/3) 28', 56', 75'	Report	Try: S. Lam 38' m Paia'aua 65' c Leali'ifano 78' c Con: Leali'ifano (2/3) 66', 79'; Pen: Leuila (1/2) 25'

Stadium de Toulouse, Toulouse
Attendance: 31,794
Referee: Jaco Peyper (South Africa)

7 October 2023
17:45 CEST (UTC+2)

England	18–17	Samoa (1 BP)
Try: Chessum 9' m Care 73' c Con: Farrell (1/2) 74'; Pen: Farrell (2/3) 18', 58'	Report	Try: Ah Wong (2) 22' c, 29' c Con: Sopoaga (2/2) 24', 30'; Pen: Sopoaga (1/2) 48'

Stade Pierre-Mauroy, Villeneuve-d'Ascq
Attendance: 47,891
Referee: Andrew Brace (Ireland)

Pos	Team	Pld	W	D	L	PF	PA	PD	TF	TA	B	Pts	Qualification
1	England	4	4	0	0	150	39	+111	17	3	2	18	Advance to knockout stage, and qualification to the 2027 Men's Rugby World Cup
2	Argentina	4	3	0	1	127	69	+58	15	5	2	14	Advance to knockout stage, and qualification to the 2027 Men's Rugby World Cup
3	Japan	4	2	0	2	109	107	+2	12	14	1	9	Qualification to the 2027 Men's Rugby World Cup
4	Samoa	4	1	0	3	92	75	+17	11	7	3	7	
5	Chile	4	0	0	4	27	215	−188	4	30	0	0	

Source: World Rugby
Rules for classification: Pool stage tiebreakers

== Overall record ==
Against	Played	Win	Draw	Lost	Win %
Argentina	4	2	0	2	50
Australia	1	0	0	1	0
Chile	1	1	0	0	100
England	4	0	0	4	0
Fiji	1	1	0	0	100
Georgia	1	1	0	0	100
Ireland	1	0	0	1	0
Italy	1	1	0	0	100
Japan	4	1	0	3	25
Namibia	1	1	0	0	100
Russia	1	1	0	0	100
Scotland	4	0	0	4	0
South Africa	5	0	0	5	0
Tonga	1	0	0	1	0
Uruguay	1	1	0	0	100
United States	2	2	0	0	100
Wales	3	2	0	1	66.67
Overall	30	14	0	22	46.67

== Hosting ==
Samoa has not hosted any World Cup games, and has not put in bids for future tournaments. Due to the lack of facilities, and the small size of the island nation, it is unlikely it will do so in the future.

== Portrayal on screen ==
Samoa can be seen playing South Africa in the feature film Invictus based on the 1995 Rugby World Cup.

== See also ==
- National team appearances in the Rugby World Cup
