= Ireland at the Rugby World Cup =

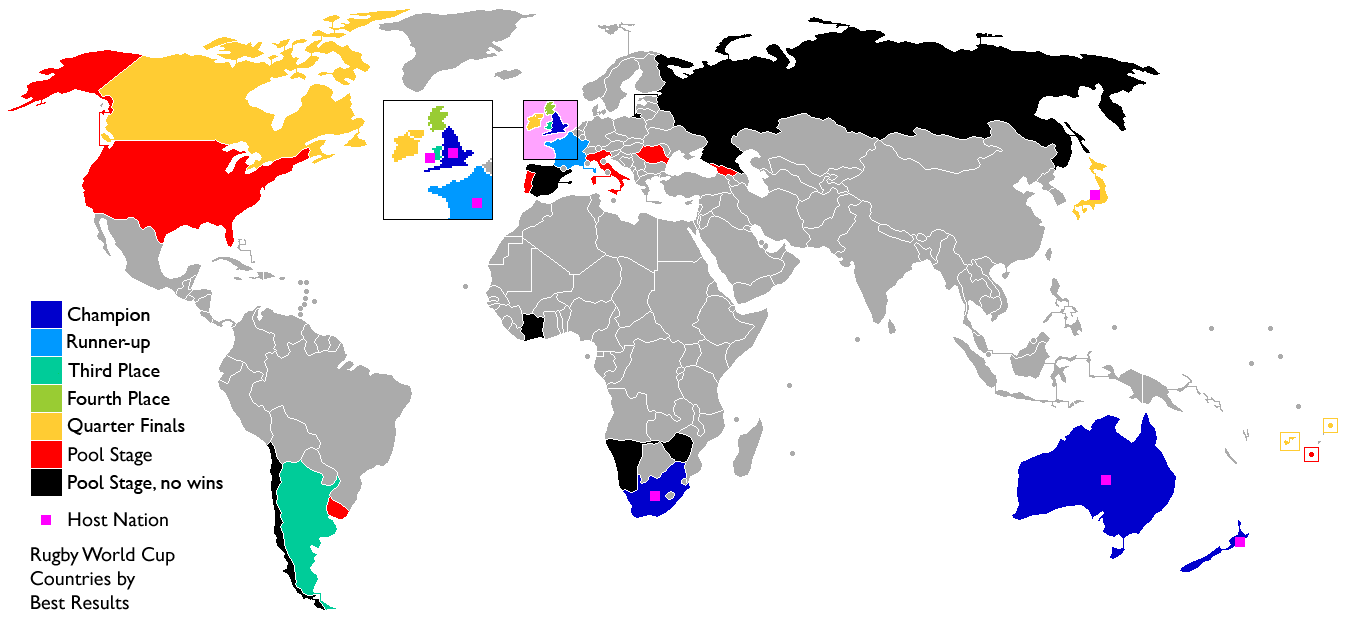
Map of nations' best results, excluding nations which unsuccessfully participated in qualifying tournaments.

The Ireland national rugby union team have played in all ten Rugby World Cup tournaments. They have reached the quarter-finals at all but two tournaments, but have yet to progress to the semi-finals. They have finished top of their pool on three occasions.

Ireland has competed at every Rugby World Cup since the tournament was first held in Australia and New Zealand in 1987.

== Summary ==
After a loss to Wales, Ireland finished second in their pool in 1987 but were then knocked out by Australia in their quarter final in Sydney.

In 1991 Ireland again lost only the one match in pool play (to Scotland). They again met the Australians in the quarter-finals, who defeated them by one point. Runner-up in their pool in 1995 to New Zealand, Ireland were defeated by France in their quarter-final in Durban.

Ireland finished second in their pool in 1999, behind Australia and went into the quarter-final play-offs (a system exclusive to the 1999 tournament). There they lost to Argentina, and thus, not being quarter-finalists, they were not given automatic entry into 2003.

They defeated Russia and Georgia to go through the 2003 World Cup as Europe 1. They finished second to Australia in their pool, and were knocked out by France in the quarter finals.

They started in the so-called "Group of death" with hosts France, Argentina, Namibia and Georgia in the 2007 Rugby World Cup. They played Namibia (the lowest ranked team in the World cup) in their opening game on 9 September which resulted in a narrow 32–17 win. Their progress was then put into doubt when they beat Georgia 14–10, not obtaining a bonus point. France's victory over Namibia 87–10 put Ireland's progression from the group in doubt, and this was compounded when the French defeated Ireland 25–3. Entering their last group match against Argentina, needing four tries to secure a bonus point without allowing Argentina anything, Ireland were defeated by 30 points to 15 and crashed out at the pool stage for the first time.

Ireland began their 2011 Rugby World Cup campaign on the back of four defeats in a series of warm-up tests in August, with a 22–10 victory over the United States in New Plymouth on 11 September. Failing to secure a bonus point against world cup minnows the United States, a team ranked far below Ireland, this was an unconvincing win. Contrary to preceding form, and indeed beating most commentators expectations, Ireland produced a memorable performance to defeat reigning tri-nations champions Australia 15–6 in their second pool game in Eden Park in Auckland on 17 September. This was the first Irish win against tri-nations opposition in the southern hemisphere in 32 years. It was also Ireland's first ever win against Australia in the Rugby World Cup. After comprehensive wins against Russia and Italy in the final two pool-stage matches, Ireland topped Pool C. This was the first ever time Ireland came first in a world cup pool. Ireland advanced to the quarter-finals to face Wales in Wellington. They were defeated 22–10 by the Welsh, thus ending their 2011 campaign.

Ireland topped Pool D of the 2015 Rugby World Cup with four victories and with two bonus points. Ireland beat Canada and Romania with bonus points in their first two games. Ireland then faced Italy, coming out on top 16–9, the only try coming from Keith Earls who surpassed Brian O'Driscoll as Ireland's leading Rugby World Cup try scorer with eight. The final pool game saw Ireland face France. The winner would set up a quarter final against Argentina and avoid the All Blacks. Ireland overcame the loss to injury of key players Johnny Sexton, Peter O'Mahony and Paul O'Connell to run out 24–9 winners. The victory set up another game for Ireland in the Millennium Stadium against Pool C runners up Argentina on 18 October 2015. Ireland battled and came back from a 17-point deficit to come within 3 points of their opponents, but eventually lost 43–20.

At the 2019 Rugby World Cup, Ireland began with a 27–3 win against Scotland on 22 September before losing to Japan a week later 19–12 in the Shizuoka Stadium. Wins over Russia by 35-0 and Samoa by 47-5 set up a quarter-final against New Zealand on 19 October. In Joe Schmidt's last game in charge, New Zealand won easily by 46–14 to eliminate Ireland from the World Cup at the quarter-final stage for the seventh time.

At the 2023 Rugby World Cup, Ireland ranked 1st in the world opened their campaign with their biggest ever win at a Rugby World Cup beating Romania 82–8 in Pool B on 9 September. On 16 September they defeated Tonga 59–16, and a week later won against South Africa 13–8. Ireland went on to win their final pool match against Scotland 36–14 at Stade de France on 7 October and finished top of the pool. In the quarter-finals a week later they lost 24–28 to New Zealand at the Stade de France, and were knocked out of the tournament. It was the eighth time that Ireland have been knocked out at the quarter-final stage.

== By position ==
Rugby World Cup record									Qualification						
Year	Round	Pld	W	D	L	PF	PA	Squad	Pos	Pld	W	D	L	PF	PA
(New Zealand) (Australia) 1987	Quarter-finals	4	2	0	2	99	74	Squad	Invited						
(England) (France) (Ireland) (Scotland) (Wales) 1991	Quarter-finals	4	2	0	2	120	70	Squad	Automatically qualified						
(South Africa) 1995	Quarter-finals	4	2	0	2	105	130	Squad	Automatically qualified						
(Wales) 1999	QF play-off	4	2	0	2	124	73	Squad	1st	2	2	0	0	123	35
(Australia) 2003	Quarter-finals	5	3	0	2	162	99	Squad	1st	2	2	0	0	98	17
(France) 2007	Pool stage	4	2	0	2	64	82	Squad	Automatically qualified						
(New Zealand) 2011	Quarter-finals	5	4	0	1	145	56	Squad	Automatically qualified						
(England) 2015	Quarter-finals	5	4	0	1	154	78	Squad	Automatically qualified						
(Japan) 2019	Quarter-finals	5	3	0	2	135	73	Squad	Automatically qualified						
(France) 2023	Quarter-finals	5	4	0	1	214	74	Squad	Automatically qualified						
(Australia) 2027	Qualified								Automatically qualified						
(United States) 2031	To be determined								To be determined						
Total	—	45	28	0	17	1322	809	—	—	4	4	0	0	221	52
Champions; Runners–up; Third place; Fourth place; Home venue

== Matches ==
=== 1987 Rugby World Cup ===
Pool 2 matches –

Team	Pld	W	D	L	PF	PA	PD	T	Pts	Qualification
Wales	3	3	0	0	82	31	+51	13	6	Knockout stage
Ireland	3	2	0	1	84	41	+43	11	4	Knockout stage
Canada	3	1	0	2	65	90	−25	8	2	
Tonga	3	0	0	3	29	98	−69	3	0	

25 May 1987

Ireland	6–13	Wales
Pen: Kiernan (2)	Report	Try: Ring; Pen: Thorburn; Drop: Davies (2)

Athletic Park, Wellington
Attendance: 15,000
Referee: Kerry Fitzgerald (Australia)

30 May 1987

Canada	19–46	Ireland
Try: Cardinal; Pen: Rees (3); Wyatt; Drop: Rees	Report	Try: Crossan (2); Bradley; Spillane; Ringland; MacNeill; Con: Kiernan (5); Pen: Kiernan (2); Drop: Ward; Kiernan

Carisbrook, Dunedin
Attendance: 9,000
Referee: Fred Howard (England)

3 June 1987

Ireland	32–9	Tonga
Try: Mullin (3); MacNeill (2); Con: Ward (3); Pen: Ward (2)	Report	Pen: Amone (3)

Ballymore, Brisbane
Attendance: 4,000
Referee: Guy Maurette (France)

Quarter-final

7 June 1987

Australia	33–15	Ireland
Tries: Burke (2); McIntyre; Smith; Con: Lynagh (4); Pen: Lynagh (3)	Report	Tries: Lee Reynolds; Kiernan; Con: Kiernan (2); Pen: Kiernan

Concord Oval, Sydney
Attendance: 14,356
Referee: Brian Anderson (Scotland)

=== 1991 Rugby World Cup ===
Pool 2 matches –

Team	Pld	W	D	L	PF	PA	PD	Pts
Scotland	3	3	0	0	122	36	+86	6
Ireland	3	2	0	1	102	51	+51	4
Japan	3	1	0	2	77	87	−10	2
Zimbabwe	3	0	0	3	31	158	−127	0

1991-10-06

Ireland	55–11	Zimbabwe
Tries: Robinson (4), Popplewell (2), Geoghegan, Curtis; Con: Keyes (4); Pen: Keyes (5)	Report	Tries: Dawson, Schultz; Pen: Ferreira

Lansdowne Road, Dublin
Attendance: 40,000
Referee: Keith Lawrence (New Zealand)

1991-10-09

Ireland	32–16	Japan
Tries: Mannion (2), O’Hara, Staples; Con: Keyes (2); Pen: Keyes (4)	Report	Tries: Hayashi, Kajihara, Yoshida; Con: Hosokawa (2)

Lansdowne Road, Dublin
Attendance: 30,000
Referee: Laikini Colati (Fiji)

1991-10-12

Scotland	24–15	Ireland
Tries: Shiel, Armstrong, S. Hastings; Con: G. Hastings (2); Pen: G. Hastings (3); Drop: Chalmers	Report	Pen: Keyes (4); Drop: Keyes

Murrayfield, Edinburgh
Attendance: 60,000
Referee: Fred Howard (England)

Quarter-final

20 October 1991

Ireland	18–19	Australia
Tries: Hamilton; Con: Keyes; Pen: Keyes (3); Drop: Keyes	Report	Tries: Campese (2), Lynagh; Con: Lynagh (2); Pen: Lynagh

Lansdowne Road, Dublin
Attendance: 54,500
Referee: Jim Fleming (Scotland)

=== 1995 Rugby World Cup ===
Pool C matches –

Team	Pld	W	D	L	PF	PA	PD	Pts
New Zealand	3	3	0	0	222	45	+177	9
Ireland	3	2	0	1	93	94	−1	7
Wales	3	1	0	2	89	68	+21	5
Japan	3	0	0	3	55	252	−197	3

1995-05-27

Ireland	19–43	New Zealand
Tries: David Corkery, Denis McBride, Gary Halpin; Con: Eric Elwood (2)	Report	Tries: Jonah Lomu (2), Josh Kronfeld, Frank Bunce, Glen Osborne; Con: Andrew Mehrtens (3); Pen: Andrew Mehrtens (4)

Ellis Park, Johannesburg
Attendance: 38 000
Referee: Wayne Erickson (Australia)

1995-05-31

Ireland	50–28	Japan
Tries: Neil Francis, Simon Geoghegan, David Corkery, Eddie Halvey, Niall Hogan; Con: Paul Burke (6); Pen: Paul Burke	Report	Tries: Sinali Latu, Ko Izawa, Seiji Hirao, Masanori Takura; Con: Yoshihito Yoshida (4)

Free State Stadium, Bloemfontein
Attendance: 15 000
Referee: Stef Neethling (South Africa)

1995-06-04

Ireland	24–23	Wales
Tries: Eddie Halvey, Nick Popplewell, Denis McBride; Con: Eric Elwood (3); Pen: Eric Elwood	Report	Tries: Jonathan Humphreys, Hemi Taylor; Con: Neil Jenkins (2); Pen: Neil Jenkins (2); Drop: Adrian Davies

Ellis Park, Johannesburg
Attendance: 35 000
Referee: Ian Rogers (South Africa)

Quarter finals –

1995-06-10

France	36–12	Ireland
Tries: Philippe Saint-Andre, Émile Ntamack; Con: Thierry Lacroix; Pen: Thierry Lacroix (8)	Report	Pen: Eric Elwood (4)

Kings Park Stadium, Durban
Attendance: 18 000
Referee: Ed Morrison (England)

=== 1999 Rugby World Cup ===
Pool E matches –

Team	Pld	W	D	L	PF	PA	PD	Pts
Australia	3	3	0	0	135	31	+104	9
Ireland	3	2	0	1	100	45	+55	7
Romania	3	1	0	2	50	126	−76	5
United States	3	0	0	3	52	135	−83	3

1999-10-02

Ireland	53–8	United States
Tries: Keith Wood (4), Brian O'Driscoll, Justin Bishop, Penalty try Con: David Humphreys (4); Eric Elwood (2); Pen: David Humphreys (2)	Report	Tries: Kevin Dalzell; Pen: Kevin Dalzell

Lansdowne Road, Dublin
Attendance: 30,000
Referee: Joel Dume (France)

1999-10-10

Ireland	3–23	Australia
Pen: David Humphreys	Report	Tries: Ben Tune, Tim Horan; Con: Matt Burke (2); Pen: Matt Burke (2), John Eales

Lansdowne Road, Dublin
Attendance: 49,250
Referee: Clayton Thomas (Wales)

1999-10-15

Ireland	44–14	Romania
Tries: Conor O'Shea (2), Andrew Ward, Thomas Tierney, Dion O'Cuinneagain; Con: Eric Elwood (5); Pen: Eric Elwood (2); Drop goals: Brian O'Driscoll	Report	Tries: Cristian Săuan; Pen: Petre Mitu (3)

Lansdowne Road, Dublin
Attendance: 33,000
Referee: Brain Campsell (England)

Quarter-final play off

1999-10-20

Ireland	24–28	Argentina
Pen: David Humphreys (7); Drop: David Humphreys	Report	Tries: Diego Albanese; Con: Gonzalo Quesada; Pen: Gonzalo Quesada (7)

Stade Félix Bollaert, Lens
Attendance: 22,000
Referee: Stuart Dickinson (Australia)

=== 2003 Rugby World Cup ===
Group A matches –

Team	Pld	W	D	L	PF	PA	PD	BP	Pts	Qualification
Australia	4	4	0	0	273	32	+241	2	18	Quarter-finals
Ireland	4	3	0	1	141	56	+85	3	15	Quarter-finals
Argentina	4	2	0	2	140	57	+83	3	11	
Romania	4	1	0	3	65	192	−127	1	5	
Namibia	4	0	0	4	28	310	−282	0	0	

2003-10-11

Ireland	45–17	Romania
Tries: S. Horgan, Wood, Hickie (2), Costello; Con: Humphreys (3), O'Gara; Pen: Humphreys (4)	Report	Tries: Penalty try, Maftei; Con: Tofan, Vioreanu; Pen: Tofan

Bluetongue Central Coast Stadium, Gosford
Attendance: 19,123
Referee: Jonathan Kaplan (South Africa)

2003-10-19

Ireland	64–7	Namibia
Tries: Quinlan (2), Dempsey, Hickie, Horan, Miller (2), G. Easterby, S. Horgan, Kelly; Con: O'Gara (7)	Report	Tries: Powell; Con: Wessels

Sydney Football Stadium, Sydney
Attendance: 35,382
Referee: Andrew Cole (Australia)

2003-10-26

Argentina	15–16	Ireland
Pen: Quesada (3); Drop: Quesada, Corleto	Report	Tries: Quinlan; Con: Humphreys; Pen: Humphreys, O'Gara (2)

Adelaide Oval
Attendance: 30,203
Referee: André Watson (South Africa)

2003-11-01

Australia	17–16	Ireland
Tries: Smith; Pen: Flatley (3); Drop: Gregan	Report	Tries: O'Driscoll; Con: O'Gara; Pen: O'Gara (2); Drop: O'Driscoll

Telstra Dome, Melbourne
Attendance: 54,206
Referee: Paddy O'Brien (New Zealand)

Quarter-finals

2003-11-09

France	43–21	Ireland
Tries: Magne 3' c Dominici 29' c Harinordoquy 33' c Crenca 47' c Con: Michalak (4); Pen: Michalak (5)	Report	Tries: Maggs 52' c O'Driscoll (6) 65' c, 80+2' c Con: Humphreys (3)

Telstra Dome, Melbourne
Attendance: 37,134
Referee: Jonathan Kaplan (South Africa)

=== 2007 Rugby World Cup ===
Pos	Team	Pld	W	D	L	PF	PA	PD	B	Pts	Qualification
1	Argentina	4	4	0	0	143	33	+110	2	18	Qualified for the quarter-finals
2	France	4	3	0	1	188	37	+151	3	15	Qualified for the quarter-finals
3	Ireland	4	2	0	2	64	82	−18	1	9	Eliminated, automatic qualification for RWC 2011
4	Georgia	4	1	0	3	50	111	−61	1	5	
5	Namibia	4	0	0	4	30	212	−182	0	0	

9 September 2007
20:00

Ireland	32–17	Namibia
Tries: O'Driscoll 5' c Trimble 19' m Easterby 30' m Penalty try 49' c Flannery 76' m Con: O'Gara (2/5); Pen: O'Gara (1/1) 17'	Report	Tries: Nieuwenhuis 60' c Van Zyl 64' c Con: Wessels (2/2); Pen: Wessels (1/2) 40+'

Stade Chaban-Delmas, Bordeaux
Attendance: 33,694
Referee: Joël Jutge (France)

15 September 2007
21:00

Ireland	14–10	Georgia
Tries: R. Best 17' c Dempsey 55' c Con: O'Gara (2/2)	Report	Try: Shkinin 45' c Con: Kvirikashvili (1/1); Pen: Kvirikashvili (1/2) 37'

Stade Chaban-Delmas, Bordeaux
Attendance: 33,807
Referee: Wayne Barnes (England)

21 September 2007
21:00

France	25–3	Ireland
Tries: Clerc (2) 59' m, 69' m Pen: Élissalde (5/6) 7', 18', 22', 40+', 55'	Report	Drop: O'Gara (1/1) 37'

Stade de France, Saint-Denis
Attendance: 80,267
Referee: Chris White (England)

30 September 2007
17:00

Ireland	15–30	Argentina
Tries: O'Driscoll 32' c Murphy 47' m Con: O'Gara (1/2); Pen: O'Gara (1/1) 20'	Report	Tries: Borges 17' m Agulla 39' c Con: F. Contepomi (1/2); Pen: F. Contepomi (3/4) 43', 62', 66'; Drop: Hernández (3/5) 21', 36', 79'

Parc des Princes, Paris
Attendance: 45,450
Referee: Paul Honiss (New Zealand)

=== 2011 Rugby World Cup ===
Ireland qualified for the 2011 RWC automatically.

Pos	Team	Pld	W	D	L	PF	PA	PD	T	B	Pts	Qualification
1	Ireland	4	4	0	0	135	34	+101	15	1	17	Advanced to the quarter-finals and qualified for the 2015 Rugby World Cup
2	Australia	4	3	0	1	173	48	+125	25	3	15	Advanced to the quarter-finals and qualified for the 2015 Rugby World Cup
3	Italy	4	2	0	2	92	95	−3	13	2	10	Eliminated but qualified for 2015 Rugby World Cup
4	United States	4	1	0	3	38	122	−84	4	0	4	
5	Russia	4	0	0	4	57	196	−139	8	1	1	

11 September 2011
18:00

Ireland	22 – 10	United States
Try: Bowe (2) 40' c, 60' c Best 56' m Con: Sexton (1/1); O'Gara (1/2); Pen: Sexton (1/5) 17'	Report	Try: Emerick 80+' c Con: Malifa (1/1); Pen: Paterson (1/2) 54'

Stadium Taranaki, New Plymouth
Attendance: 20,823
Referee: Craig Joubert (South Africa)

17 September 2011
20:30

Australia	6 – 15	Ireland
Pen: O'Connor (2/4) 11', 23'	Report	Pen: Sexton (2/5) 17', 49'; O'Gara (2/2) 62', 71'; Drop: Sexton 19'

Eden Park, Auckland
Attendance: 58,678
Referee: Bryce Lawrence (New Zealand)

25 September 2011
18:00

Ireland	62 – 12	Russia
Try: McFadden 10' c O'Brien 13' c Boss 38' c Earls(2) 39' c, 48' c Trimble 40+' m Kearney 65' c Jennings 73' c Buckley 79' m Con: O'Gara (6/7); Sexton (1/2); Pen: O'Gara (1/1) 6'	Report	Try: Artemyev 50' c Simplikevich 59' m Con: Rachkov (1/2)

Rotorua International Stadium, Rotorua
Attendance: 25,661
Referee: Craig Joubert (South Africa)

2 October 2011
20:30

Ireland	36 – 6	Italy
Try: O'Driscoll 47' c Earls (2) 52' c, 80+' c Con: O'Gara (2/2); Sexton (1/1); Pen: O'Gara (4/5) 7', 18', 35', 44'; Sexton (1/1) 70'	Report	Pen: Mi. Bergamasco (2/3) 11', 21'

Otago Stadium, Dunedin
Attendance: 28,027
Referee: Jonathan Kaplan (South Africa)

Quarter-finals

8 October 2011
18:00 NZDT (UTC+13)

Ireland	10 – 22	Wales
Try: Earls 45' c Con: O'Gara (1/1); Pen: O'Gara (1/1) 24'	Report	Try: Williams 3' c Phillips 51' m J. Davies 64' c Con: Priestland (2/3); Pen: Halfpenny (1/1) 29'; Priestland (0/2)

Westpac Stadium, Wellington
Attendance: 35,787
Referee: Craig Joubert (South Africa)

=== 2015 Rugby World Cup ===
Pos	Team	Pld	W	D	L	PF	PA	PD	T	B	Pts	Qualification
1	Ireland	4	4	0	0	134	35	+99	16	2	18	Advanced to the quarter-finals and qualified for the 2019 Rugby World Cup
2	France	4	3	0	1	120	63	+57	12	2	14	Advanced to the quarter-finals and qualified for the 2019 Rugby World Cup
3	Italy	4	2	0	2	74	88	−14	7	2	10	Eliminated but qualified for 2019 Rugby World Cup
4	Romania	4	1	0	3	60	129	−69	7	0	4	
5	Canada	4	0	0	4	58	131	−73	7	2	2	

19 September 2015	Ireland	50–7	Canada	Millennium Stadium, Cardiff
27 September 2015	Ireland	44–10	Romania	Wembley Stadium, London
4 October 2015	Ireland	16–9	Italy	Olympic Stadium, London
11 October 2015	France	9–24	Ireland	Millennium Stadium, Cardiff

Quarter-finals

18 October 2015
13:00 BST (UTC+01)

Ireland	20–43	Argentina
Try: Fitzgerald 26' c Murphy 44' c Con: Madigan (2/2) 27', 45'; Pen: Madigan (2/4) 20', 53'	Report	Try: Moroni 3' c Imhoff (2) 10' c, 73' c Tuculet 69' c Con: Sánchez (4/4) 5', 10', 70', 74'; Pen: Sánchez (5/6) 13', 22', 51', 64', 77'

Millennium Stadium, Cardiff
Attendance: 72,316
Referee: Jérôme Garcès (France)

=== 2019 Rugby World Cup ===
Pool stage

Pos	Team	Pld	W	D	L	PF	PA	PD	T	B	Pts	Qualification
1	Japan	4	4	0	0	115	62	+53	13	3	19	Advanced to the quarter-finals and qualified for the 2023 Rugby World Cup
2	Ireland	4	3	0	1	121	27	+94	18	4	16	Advanced to the quarter-finals and qualified for the 2023 Rugby World Cup
3	Scotland	4	2	0	2	119	55	+64	16	3	11	Eliminated but qualified for 2023 Rugby World Cup
4	Samoa	4	1	0	3	58	128	−70	8	1	5	
5	Russia	4	0	0	4	19	160	−141	1	0	0	

22 September 2019
16:45 JST (UTC+09)

(1 BP) Ireland	27–3	Scotland
Try: Ja. Ryan 6' c Best 14' m Furlong 25' c Conway 56' m Con: Sexton (1/2) 8'; Murray (1/2) 27'; Pen: Carty (1/1) 68'	Report	Pen: Laidlaw (1/1) 21'

International Stadium Yokohama, Yokohama
Attendance: 63,731
Referee: Wayne Barnes (England)

28 September 2019
16:15 JST (UTC+09)

Japan	19–12	Ireland (1 BP)
Try: Fukuoka 58' c Con: Tamura (1/1) 60'; Pen: Tamura (4/6) 17', 33', 39', 71'	Report	Try: Ringrose 13' m Kearney 20' c Con: Carty (1/2) 21'

Shizuoka Stadium Ecopa, Fukuroi
Attendance: 47,813
Referee: Angus Gardner (Australia)

3 October 2019
19:15 JST (UTC+09)

(1 BP) Ireland	35–0	Russia
Try: Kearney 1' c O'Mahony 12' c Ruddock 34' c Conway 61' c Ringrose 75' c Con: Sexton (3/3) 3', 14', 36'; Carty (2/2) 62', 76'	Report

Kobe Misaki Stadium, Kobe
Attendance: 26,856
Referee: Jérôme Garcès (France)

12 October 2019
19:45 JST (UTC+09)

(1 BP) Ireland	47–5	Samoa
Try: Best 4' c Furlong 10' c Sexton (2) 21' c, 39' m Larmour 48' c Stander 65' c Conway 70' c Con: Sexton (4/5) 5', 11', 23', 50; Carbery (2/2) 67', 72'	Report	Try: J. Lam 26' m

Fukuoka Hakatanomori Stadium, Fukuoka
Attendance: 17,967
Referee: Nic Berry (Australia)

Quarter-finals

19 October 2019
19:15 JST (UTC+09)

New Zealand	46–14	Ireland
Try: A. Smith (2) 14' c, 20' c B. Barrett 32'; Taylor 48' c Todd 61'; Bridge 73' c J. Barrett 79'; Con: Mo'unga (4/7) 15', 22', 49', 74'; Pen: Mo'unga (1/1) 6'	Report	Try: Henshaw 69'; Penalty try 76'; Con: Carbery (1/1) 69'

Tokyo Stadium, Chōfu
Attendance: 46,686
Referee: Nigel Owens (Wales)

=== 2023 Rugby World Cup ===
Pool stage

Pos	Team	Pld	W	D	L	PF	PA	PD	TF	TA	B	Pts	Qualification
1	Ireland	4	4	0	0	190	46	+144	27	5	3	19	Advance to knockout stage, and qualification to the 2027 Men's Rugby World Cup
2	South Africa	4	3	0	1	151	34	+117	22	4	3	15	Advance to knockout stage, and qualification to the 2027 Men's Rugby World Cup
3	Scotland	4	2	0	2	146	71	+75	21	10	2	10	Qualification to the 2027 Men's Rugby World Cup
4	Tonga	4	1	0	3	96	177	−81	13	25	1	5	
5	Romania	4	0	0	4	32	287	−255	4	43	0	0	

Source: World Rugby
Rules for classification: Pool stage tiebreakers

9 September 2023
15:30 CEST (UTC+2)

(1 BP) Ireland	82–8	Romania
Try: Gibson-Park 5' c Keenan 13' c Beirne (2) 17' m, 80+3' c Aki (2) 34' c, 75' c Sexton (2) 40' c, 62' c Herring 45' c O'Mahony (2) 50' c, 70' c McCarthy 67' c Con: Sexton (7/8) 6', 13', 36', 40', 46', 51', 63'; Crowley (4/4) 68', 72', 76', 80+3'	Report	Try: Rupanu 3' m Pen: Rupanu (1/1) 21'

Stade de Bordeaux, Bordeaux
Attendance: 41,170
Referee: Nika Amashukeli (Georgia)

16 September 2023
9:00 CEST (UTC+2)

(1 BP) Ireland	59–16	Tonga
Try: Beirne 21' c Doris 27' c Hansen 33' c Sexton 38' c Lowe 59' c Aki 64' c, 69' c Herring 80' c Con: Sexton 22', 28', 34', 39', Byrne 60', 65', 69', 80+1'; Pen: Sexton 7'	Report	Try: Fifita 44' c Con: Havili 44'; Pen: Havili 16', 24', 43'

Stade de la Beaujoire, Nantes
Referee: Wayne Barnes (England)

23 September 2023
9:00 CEST (UTC+2)

South Africa	8–13	Ireland
Try: Kolbe 51'; Pen: Libbok 6'	Report	Try: Hansen 33'; Con: Sexton 35'; Pen: Sexton 59'; Crowley 77'

Stade de France, Paris
Attendance: 78,750
Referee: Ben O'Keeffe (New Zealand)

7 October 2023
9:00 CEST (UTC+2)

Ireland	36–14	Scotland
Try: Lowe2'; Keenan 26', 39'; Henderson 32'; Sheehan 44'; Ringrose 58'; Con: Sexton 27', 33', 40'	Report	Try: Ashman 64'; Price 65'; Con: Russell 65', 66'

Stade de France, Paris
Referee: Nic Berry (Australia)

Quarter-finals

14 October 2023
21:00 CEST (UTC+2)

Ireland	24–28	New Zealand
Try: Aki 27' c Gibson-Park 39' c Penalty try 64'; Con: Sexton (2/2) 29', 40'; Pen: Sexton (1/2) 22'	Report	Try: Fainga'anuku 19' c Savea 33' m Jordan 53' c Con: Mo'unga (1/2) 21'; J. Barrett (1/1) 54'; Pen: Mo'unga (1/1) 8'; J. Barrett (2/3) 14', 69'

Stade de France, Saint-Denis
Attendance: 78,845
Referee: Wayne Barnes (England)

== Overall record ==
Against	Played	Win	Draw	Lost	Win %
Argentina	4	1	0	3	25
Australia	5	1	0	4	20
Canada	2	2	0	0	100
France	4	1	0	3	25
Georgia	1	1	0	0	100
Italy	2	2	0	0	100
Japan	3	2	0	1	66.67
Namibia	2	2	0	0	100
New Zealand	3	0	0	3	0
Romania	4	4	0	0	100
Russia	2	2	0	0	100
Samoa	1	1	0	0	100
Scotland	3	2	0	1	66.67
South Africa	1	1	0	0	100
Tonga	2	2	0	0	100
United States	2	2	0	0	100
Wales	3	1	0	2	33.33
Zimbabwe	1	1	0	0	100
Overall	45	28	0	17	62.22

== Hosting ==
The Rugby World Cup is held every four years, and tends to alternate between the northern and southern hemispheres. Most northern hemisphere tournaments so far has been held in Europe, with the exclusion of the Japan World Cup in 2019 and in general Ireland usually hosts some games when it is held in Europe.

=== 1991: UK/Ireland/France ===
Irish stadiums in 1991 World Cup
City	Stadium	Capacity
(Republic of Ireland) Dublin	Lansdowne Road	49,000
(Northern Ireland) Belfast	Ravenhill	12,300

The 1991 Rugby World Cup final was played in England, while pool and finals games were played all over European nations. Pool A, which England was in, saw matches played mostly in London, though games were also taken to Leicester, Gloucester and Otley. Pool B games, which involved European nations, Scotland and Ireland, had all their games in either Dublin or Edinburgh with one game being played in Belfast. Pool C, which Wales was a part of, had all their games in Cardiff, with one taken to Pontypridd, one played in Pontypool and one played in Llanelli. Pool D, which France were a part of, saw games played in Agen, Bayonne, Béziers and Grenoble. None of the quarter-finals or semi-finals were played in England. The final was played at the Rugby Football Union's Twickenham.

=== 1999: Wales ===
Irish stadiums in 1999 World Cup
City	Stadium	Capacity
(Republic of Ireland) Dublin	Lansdowne Road	49,250
(Republic of Ireland) Limerick	Thomond Park	13,500
(Northern Ireland) Belfast	Ravenhill Stadium	12,500

The 1999 World Cup was hosted by Wales, but an agreement was reached so that the other unions in the Five Nations Championship (England, France, Ireland and Scotland) also hosted matches.

The format of the pool games was similar to the 1991 World Cup in England. All Pool A games were held in Scotland, Pool B games in England, Pool C games in France and Pool D games were all held in Wales. Second round play-offs and the quarter-finals were held a variety of European venues, the semi-finals were held at Twickenham Stadium, London. The third place play-off and the final were held at the new Millennium Stadium in Cardiff.

Venues in Ireland included Lansdowne Road, the traditional home of the Irish Rugby Football Union, Ravenhill, the Northern Ireland IRFU owned venue and Thomond Park.

=== 2007: France ===
The 2007 competition was held in France, with some games played in Wales and Scotland. France won the right in 2003 to host the 2007 tournament. Three matches were played at Cardiff's Millennium Stadium. Two matches were held at Edinburgh's Murrayfield. Ireland were also offered to host matches at Lansdowne Road in Dublin, but had to decline the offer as construction work was scheduled to begin on the stadium.

=== 2023: Bid ===
Ireland bid to host the 2023 Rugby World Cup, losing out to eventual hosts, France.
