= Pouvalu Latukefu =

Tonga international rugby union player

- Born: 4 March 1971 (age 55) Tonga
- Height: 6 ft 6 in (198 cm)
- Weight: 233 lb (106 kg)

Rugby union career
- Position: Lock
Provincial / State sides
Years	Team	Apps	(Points)
1993-1998	ACT Kookaburras		
International career
Years	Team	Apps	(Points)
1993-1998	Tonga	8	(5)

Pouvalu Latukefu is a Tongan former rugby union player. He played as lock.

== Career ==
His first cap for Tonga was against Japan, in Nagoya, on 11 February 1993. Along with his ACT Kookaburras teammates Ipolito Fenukitau and Falamani Mafi, Latukefu was also part of the Tongan squad for the 1995 Rugby World Cup, where he played two matches in the tournament against Scotland in Pretoria and against Ivory Coast in Rustenburg, scoring a try in the latter. His last international cap was against Fiji in Brisbane, on 26 September 1998.
