= Mario Gerosa =

Argentine rugby union player (born 1967)

Mario Oscar Gerosa (born 27 April 1967 in Rosario, Argentina) is an Argentine-born Italian former rugby union player, coach and a current sports director. He played as a wing.

Gerosa first team was Club Atlético del Rosario, where he won the Nacional de Clubes in 1987. He would play there from 1984/85 to 1990/91. He had 2 caps for Argentina in 1987, winning the South American Rugby Championship the same year. He still scored 4 tries, 16 points on aggregate.

Gerosa moved to Piacenza Rugby Club in 1991/92, where he would stay until 1996/97. He adopted Italian citizenship, being called for Italy, where he had 7 caps, from 1994 to 1995, scoring 4 tries, 20 points on aggregate. He was called for the 1995 Rugby World Cup, playing two games and scoring a try in 31-25 win over Argentina, at 4 June 1995, in East London. That would be his last cap for the national team.

He returned to Argentina, playing for Rosario, from 1998/99 to 2009/10, when he finished his player career, aged 43 years old. He later would be his team coach and sports director.
