= Andrei Gurănescu =

Romanian rugby union player (born 1967)

- Born: Andrei Gurănescu; 24 September 1967 (age 59) Bucharest, Romania
- Height: 1.90 m (6 ft 3 in)
- Weight: 89 kg (196 lb)

Rugby union career
- Position: Flanker
Senior career
Years	Team	Apps	(Points)
1986–1988	Steaua București		
1988–1998	Dinamo București		
1998–2000	Mogliano Rugby		
2000–2006	RCP Meaux		
International career
Years	Team	Apps	(Points)
1991–1995	Romania	17	(10)

Andrei Gurănescu (born 24 September 1967 in Bucharest) is a Romanian former rugby union football player and current coach. He played as a flanker.

He coached RCP Meaux in France.

== Club career ==
Gurănescu played for arch-rivals Steaua and Dinamo Bucharest. He also played in Italy and France.

== International career ==
Gurănescu gathered 17 caps for Romania, from his debut in 1991 to his last game in 1995. He scored 2 tries during his international career, 10 points on aggregate. He was a member of his national side for the 2nd and 3rd Rugby World Cups in 1991 and 1995 and played 3 group matches and scored a try against Springboks in Pool A match held in Cape Town, on 30 May 1995.

== Personal life ==
His younger brother Șerban also played professionally in Romania, Italy and Académica de Coimbra in Portugal.

== Honours ==
=== Club ===
Steaua Bucharest
SuperLiga
1986/87, 1987/88

Dinamo Bucharest
SuperLiga
1990/91, 1993/94, 1995/96, 1997/98
Romanian Cup
1988/89, 1995/96, 1996/97, 1997/98
