= Guy Accoceberry =

France international rugby union player (born 1967)

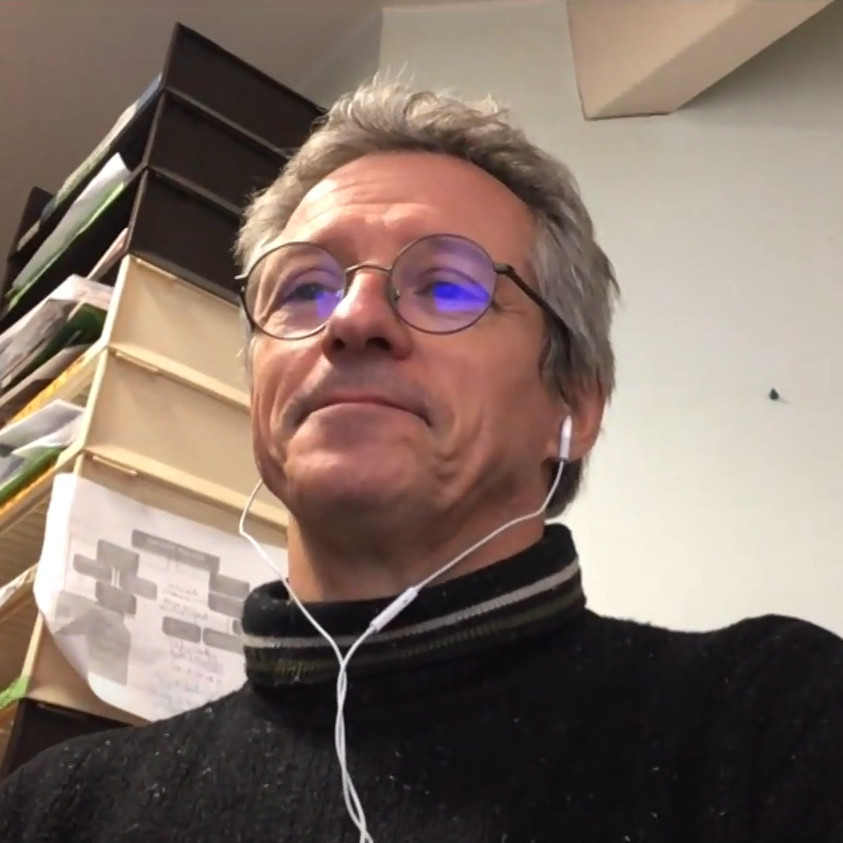
- Born: 5 May 1967 (age 59)
- Height: 1.82 m (6 ft 0 in)
- Weight: 78 kg (172 lb)

Rugby union career
- Position: Scrumhalf
International career
Years	Team	Apps	(Points)
1994-1997	France	19	(10)

Guy Accoceberry (born 5 May 1967, in Vittel) is a former French rugby union footballer. He played as a scrum-half.

He played for Tyrosse RCS and for CA Bordeaux-Bègles Gironde, from 1993/94 to 1998/1999, where he achieved the greatest success of his career.

Accoceberry had 19 caps for France, from 1994 to 1997, scoring 2 tries, 10 points in aggregate. He had two matches played at the 1995 Rugby World Cup finals, and won a Grand Slam at the Five Nations, in 1997.
