= Alfred Okou =

- Born: September 3, 1963 (age 63) Abidjan
- Height: 6 ft 1 in (1.85 m)
- Weight: 198 lb (90 kg; 14.1 st)

Rugby union career
- Position: Flanker
Senior career
Years	Team	Apps	(Points)
-	Poiters		
International career
Years	Team	Apps	(Points)
1993-1995	Ivory Coast	7	(5)

Alfred Okou (born 3 September 1963) is a former Ivorian rugby union player. He played as a flanker.

He played for Stade Poitevin Rugby in France.

Okou had 7 caps for Ivory Coast, from 1993 to 1995, scoring 1 try, 5 points in aggregate- He was called for the 1995 Rugby World Cup, playing in all the three games and scoring the single try of his career.
