= Aboubacar Soulama =

Rugby union career
- Position: Wing
International career
Years	Team	Apps	(Points)
1994-1995	Ivory Coast	4	(13)

Aboubacar Soulama is a former Ivorian rugby union player. He played as a wing.

He played for Burotic Abidjan in Ivory Coast.

Soulama had 4 caps for Ivory Coast, from 1994 to 1995, scoring 1 try, 1 conversion and 2 penalties, 13 points in aggregate. He was called for the 1995 Rugby World Cup, playing in two games and scoring a try in the 54–18 loss to France.
