= 1995 Rugby World Cup =

Men's rugby union event in South Africa

Afrikaans: Rugbywêreldbeker 1995

Tournament details
- Host nation: South Africa
- Venue: 9 (in 9 host cities)
- Dates: 25 May – 24 June (31 days)
- No. of nations: 16 (52 qualifying)

Final positions
- Champions: South Africa (1st title)
- Runner-up: New Zealand
- Third place: France

Tournament statistics
- Matches played: 32
- Attendance: 938,486 (29,328 per match)
- Top scorer(s): (France) Thierry Lacroix (112)
- Most tries: (New Zealand) Jonah Lomu (New Zealand) Marc Ellis (7 tries each)

The 1995 Rugby World Cup (Afrikaans: Rugbywêreldbeker 1995) was the third Rugby World Cup. It was hosted and won by South Africa, and was the first Rugby World Cup in which every match was held in one country.

The World Cup was the first major sporting event to take place in South Africa following the end of apartheid. It was also the first World Cup in which South Africa was allowed to compete; the International Rugby Football Board (IRFB, now World Rugby) had only readmitted South Africa to international rugby in 1992, following negotiations to end apartheid. The World Cup was also the last major event of rugby union's amateur era; two months after the tournament, the IRFB opened the sport to professionalism.

In the final, held at Ellis Park in Johannesburg on 24 June, South Africa defeated New Zealand 15–12, with Joel Stransky scoring a drop goal in extra time to win the match. Following South Africa's victory, Nelson Mandela, the President of South Africa, wearing a Springboks rugby shirt and cap, presented the Webb Ellis Cup to the South African captain François Pienaar.

== Qualifying ==
Africa	Americas	Europe	Oceania/Asia
Ivory Coast (Africa); South Africa	Argentina (Americas); Canada	England; France; Ireland; Italy (Europe 2); Romania (Europe 3); Scotland; Wales (Europe 1)	Australia; New Zealand; Tonga (Oceania); Western Samoa; Japan (Asia)

The eight quarter-finalists from the 1991 Rugby World Cup all received automatic entry, as did South Africa, as hosts. The remaining seven of the 16 positions available in the tournament were filled by regional qualifiers. The qualifying tournaments were broken up into regional associations: Africa, the Americas, Asia, Europe and Oceania. Côte d'Ivoire qualified through Africa, Japan through Asia, Argentina through the Americas, Italy, Romania and Wales through Europe, Tonga through Oceania.

== Referees ==
- (Australia) Sean Coms
- (Australia) Wayne Erickson
- (Canada) George Gadjovich
- (England) Ed Morrison
- (England) Steve Lander
- (France) Joël Dumé
- (France) Patrick Robin
- (Ireland) David McHugh
- (Ireland) Stephen Hilditch
- (Japan) Naoki Saito
- (South Korea) Han Moon-soo
- (New Zealand) Colin Hawke
- (New Zealand) Dave Bishop
- (South Africa) Stef Neethling
- (South Africa) Ian Rogers
- (Samoa) Felise Vito
- (Scotland) Jim Fleming
- (Scotland) Ken McCartney
- (United States) Don Reordan
- (Wales) Derek Bevan
- (Wales) Clayton Thomas

== Venues ==
The 1995 tournament was the first Rugby World Cup to be hosted by just one country, and thus, all the venues are within the one country. South Africa were given the rights to host the tournament in 1993, after a meeting between the IRB and both the government led by F. W. de Klerk and the African National Congress. In total, nine stadiums were used for the World Cup, most being owned by local municipalities, and the majority of the venues were upgraded prior to the tournament. Six of the nine stadiums were South African Test grounds. The four largest stadiums were used for the finals, with the final taking place at Johannesburg's Ellis Park.

There were games originally scheduled to have been played in Brakpan, Germiston, Pietermaritzburg and Witbank, but these games were reallocated to other venues. This reduced the number of venues from 14 to 9. The reasons cited for this change had to do with facilities for both the press and spectators, as well as the security. The change in the itinerary occurred in January 1994. Further changes occurred in April, so that evening games were played at stadiums with good floodlighting. It is also thought that Potchefstroom was an original venue.

Venues were paired:

- Pool 1: Cape Town, Port Elizabeth and Stellenbosch
- Pool 2: Durban and East London
- Pool 3: Johannesburg and Bloemfontein
- Pool 4: Pretoria and Rustenburg

Location of the 9 stadium hosting rugby matches at the 1995 World Rugby World Cup	Johannesburg	Pretoria	Cape Town
Location of the 9 stadium hosting rugby matches at the 1995 World Rugby World Cup	Ellis Park	Loftus Versfeld	Newlands
Location of the 9 stadium hosting rugby matches at the 1995 World Rugby World Cup	Capacity: 60,000	Capacity: 50,000	Capacity: 50,000
Location of the 9 stadium hosting rugby matches at the 1995 World Rugby World Cup	Durban	Bloemfontein	Port Elizabeth
Location of the 9 stadium hosting rugby matches at the 1995 World Rugby World Cup	Kings Park Stadium	Free State Stadium	Boet Erasmus Stadium
Location of the 9 stadium hosting rugby matches at the 1995 World Rugby World Cup	Capacity: 50,000	Capacity: 40,000	Capacity: 38,950
Location of the 9 stadium hosting rugby matches at the 1995 World Rugby World Cup	Rustenburg	East London	Stellenbosch
Location of the 9 stadium hosting rugby matches at the 1995 World Rugby World Cup	Olympia Park	Basil Kenyon Stadium	Danie Craven Stadium
Location of the 9 stadium hosting rugby matches at the 1995 World Rugby World Cup	Capacity: 30,000	Capacity: 22,000	Capacity: 16,000

== Pools & format ==
Pool A	Pool B	Pool C	Pool D
South Africa; Australia; Romania; Canada	England; Western Samoa; Italy; Argentina	New Zealand; Ireland; Wales; Japan	France; Scotland; Tonga; Ivory Coast

The tournament was contested by 16 nations using the same format that was used in 1987 and 1991 and in total 32 matches were played. The competition began on 25 May, when the hosts South Africa defeated Australia 27–18 at Newlands in Cape Town. The tournament culminated with the final between South Africa and the All Blacks at Ellis Park in Johannesburg on 24 June. In total, the tournament ran for thirty days. The nations were broken up into four pools of four, with each pool consisting of two teams that were automatically qualified and two that went through the qualifying tournaments.

=== Points system ===
The points system that was used in the pool stage was unchanged from 1991:

- 3 points for a win
- 2 points for a draw
- 1 point for playing

=== Knockout stage ===
Pool winners were drawn against opposite pool runners-up in the quarter-finals. For example, the winner of A faces the runner up of B, and the winner of B face the runner-up of A. The whole finals stage adopts a knock-out format, and the winners of the quarter-finals advance to the semi-finals, where winner 1 faces winner 2, and winner 3 faces winner 4. The winners advance to the final, and the losers contest a third/fourth place play-off two days before the final.

A total of 32 matches (24 pool stage & 8 knock-out) were played throughout the tournament over 30 days from 25 May to 24 June 1995.

== Pool stage ==
=== Pool A ===
Pos	Team	Pld	W	D	L	PF	PA	PD	Pts
1	South Africa	3	3	0	0	68	26	+42	9
2	Australia	3	2	0	1	87	41	+46	7
3	Canada	3	1	0	2	45	50	−5	5
4	Romania	3	0	0	3	14	97	−83	3

25 May 1995

South Africa	27–18	Australia
Try: Hendriks 37' m Stransky 63' c Con: Stransky (1/2) 64'; Pen: Stransky (4/4) 5', 21', 29', 45'; Drop: Stransky (1/3) 49'	Report	Try: Lynagh 33' c Kearns 78' m Con: Lynagh (1/2) 34'; Pen: Lynagh (2/3) 3', 17'

Newlands, Cape Town
Attendance: 44,778
Referee: Derek Bevan (Wales)

26 May 1995

Canada	34–3	Romania
Try: Charron; McKenzie; Snow; Con: Rees (2); Pen: Rees (4); Drop: Rees		Pen: Nichitean

Boet Erasmus Stadium, Port Elizabeth
Attendance: 8,000
Referee: Colin Hawke (New Zealand)

30 May 1995

South Africa	21–8	Romania
Try: Richter (2); Con: Johnson; Pen: Johnson (3)		Try: Gurănescu; Pen: Ivanciuc

Newlands, Cape Town
Attendance: 45,000
Referee: Ken McCartney (Scotland)

31 May 1995

Australia	27–11	Canada
Try: Lynagh; Tabua; Roff; Con: Lynagh (3); Pen: Lynagh (2)		Try: Charron; Pen: Rees (2)

Boet Erasmus Stadium, Port Elizabeth
Attendance: 16,000
Referee: Patrick Robin (France)

3 June 1995

Australia	42–3	Romania
Try: Smith; Wilson; Roff (2); Foley; Burke; Con: Burke (2); Eales (4)		Pen: Ivanciuc

Danie Craven Stadium, Stellenbosch
Attendance: 15,542
Referee: Naoki Saito (Japan)

3 June 1995

South Africa	20–0	Canada
Try: Richter (2); Con: Stransky (2); Pen: Stransky (2)

Boet Erasmus Stadium, Port Elizabeth
Attendance: 31,000
Referee: David McHugh (Ireland)

=== Pool B ===
Pos	Team	Pld	W	D	L	PF	PA	PD	Pts
1	England	3	3	0	0	95	60	+35	9
2	Western Samoa	3	2	0	1	96	88	+8	7
3	Italy	3	1	0	2	69	94	−25	5
4	Argentina	3	0	0	3	69	87	−18	3

27 May 1995

Italy	18–42	Western Samoa
Try: Vaccari; Cuttitta; Con: Dominguez; Pen: Dominguez; Drop: Dominguez	Report	Try: Lima (2); Harder (2); Kellett; Tatupu; Con: Kellett (3); Pen: Kellett (2)

Basil Kenyon Stadium, East London
Attendance: 7,868
Referee: Joël Dume (France)

27 May 1995

Argentina	18–24	England
Try: Arbizu; Noriega; Con: Arbizu; Pen: Arbizu (2)		Pen: Andrew (6); Drop: Andrew (2)

Kings Park Stadium, Durban
Attendance: 35,000
Referee: Jim Fleming (Scotland)

30 May 1995

Western Samoa	32–26	Argentina
Try: Lam; Leaupepe; Harder; Con: Kellett; Pen: Kellett (5)		Try: Penalty try Crexell; Con: Cilley (2); Pen: Cilley (4)

Basil Kenyon Stadium, East London
Attendance: 7,960
Referee: Dave Bishop (New Zealand)

31 May 1995

England	27–20	Italy
Try: R. Underwood; T. Underwood; Con: Andrew; Pen: Andrew (5)		Try: Cuttitta; Vaccari; Con: Dominguez (2); Pen: Dominguez (2)

Kings Park Stadium, Durban
Attendance: 45,093
Referee: Stephen Hilditch (Ireland)

4 June 1995

Argentina	25–31	Italy
Try: Martín; Penalty try Corral; Cilley; Con: Cilley; Pen: Cilley		Try: Vaccari; Gerosa; Dominguez; Con: Dominguez (2); Pen: Dominguez (4)

Basil Kenyon Stadium, East London
Attendance: 7,571
Referee: Clayton Thomas (Wales)

4 June 1995

England	44–22	Western Samoa
Try: R. Underwood (2); Back; Penalty try Con: Callard (3); Pen: Callard(5); Drop: Catt		Try: Sini (2); Umaga; Con: Fa'amasino (2); Pen: Fa'amasino

Kings Park Stadium, Durban
Attendance: 35,000
Referee: Patrick Robin (France)

=== Pool C ===
Pos	Team	Pld	W	D	L	PF	PA	PD	Pts
1	New Zealand	3	3	0	0	222	45	+177	9
2	Ireland	3	2	0	1	93	94	−1	7
3	Wales	3	1	0	2	89	68	+21	5
4	Japan	3	0	0	3	55	252	−197	3

27 May 1995

Japan	10–57	Wales
Try: Lopeti Oto (2)		Try: G. Thomas (3); I. Evans (2); Moore; Taylor; Con: N. Jenkins (5); Pen: N. Jenkins (4)

Free State Stadium, Bloemfontein
Attendance: 15,000
Referee: Efrahim Sklar (Argentina)

27 May 1995

Ireland	19–43	New Zealand
Try: Corkery; McBride; Halpin; Con: Elwood (2)		Try: Lomu (2); Kronfeld; Bunce; Osborne; Con: Mehrtens (3); Pen: Mehrtens (4)

Ellis Park, Johannesburg
Attendance: 38,000
Referee: Wayne Erickson (Australia)

31 May 1995

Ireland	50–28	Japan
Try: Francis; Geoghegan; Corkery; Halvey; Hogan; Penalty try (2); Con: Burke (6); Pen: Burke		Try: Latu; Izawa; Hirao; Takura; Con: Yoshida (4)

Free State Stadium, Bloemfontein
Attendance: 15,000
Referee: Stef Neethling (South Africa)

31 May 1995

New Zealand	34–9	Wales
Try: Ellis; Little; Kronfeld; Con: Mehrtens (2); Pen: Mehrtens (4); Drop: Mehrtens		Pen: N. Jenkins (2); Drop: N. Jenkins

Ellis Park, Johannesburg
Attendance: 45,000
Referee: Ed Morrison (England)

4 June 1995

Japan	17–145	New Zealand
Try: Kajihara (2); Con: Hirose (2); Pen: Hirose	Report	Try: Ellis (6); Rush (3); Wilson (3); R. Brooke (2); Osborne (2); Loe; Culhane; Henderson; Dowd; Ieremia; Con: Culhane (20)

Free State Stadium, Bloemfontein
Attendance: 25,000
Referee: George Gadjovic (Canada)

4 June 1995

Ireland	24–23	Wales
Try: Halvey; Popplewell; McBride; Con: Elwood (3); Pen: Elwood		Try: Humphreys; Taylor; Con: N. Jenkins (2); Pen: N. Jenkins (2); Drop: A. Davies

Ellis Park, Johannesburg
Attendance: 40,000
Referee: Ian Rogers (South Africa)

=== Pool D ===
Pos	Team	Pld	W	D	L	PF	PA	PD	Pts
1	France	3	3	0	0	114	47	+67	9
2	Scotland	3	2	0	1	149	27	+122	7
3	Tonga	3	1	0	2	44	90	−46	5
4	Ivory Coast	3	0	0	3	29	172	−143	3

26 May 1995

Ivory Coast	0–89	Scotland
		Try: G. Hastings (4); Logan (2); Walton (2); Wright; Chalmers; Stanger; Burnell; Shiel; Con: G. Hastings (9); Pen: G. Hastings (2)

Olympia Park, Rustenburg
Attendance: 20,000
Referee: Felise Vito (Western Samoa)

26 May 1995

France	38–10	Tonga
Try: Lacroix (2); Hueber; Saint-André; Con: Lacroix (3); Pen: Lacroix (3); Drop: Delaigue		Try: Vaʻenuku; Con: Tu'ipulotu; Pen: Tu'ipulotu

Loftus Versfeld, Pretoria
Attendance: 22,000
Referee: Steve Lander (England)

29 May 1995

France	54–18	Ivory Coast
Try: Lacroix (2); Benazzi; Téchoueyres; Viars; Accoceberry; Saint-André; Costes; Con: Deylaud (2); Lacroix (2); Pen: Lacroix (2)		Try: Soulama; Camara; Con: Kouassi; Pen: Kouassi (2)

Olympia Park, Rustenburg
Attendance: 10,000
Referee: Han Moon-Soo (South Korea)

29 May 1995

Scotland	41–5	Tonga
Try: S. Hastings; Peters; G. Hastings; Con: G. Hastings; Pen: G. Hastings (8)		Try: Fenukitau

Loftus Versfeld, Pretoria
Attendance: 21,000
Referee: Barry Leask (Australia)

3 June 1995

Ivory Coast	11–29	Tonga
Try: Okou; Pen: Dali (2)		Try: Penalty try Latukefu; Otai; Tu'ipulotu; Con: Tu'ipulotu (3); Pen: Tu'ipulotu

Olympia Park, Rustenburg
Attendance: 15,000
Referee: Don Reordan (United States)

Three minutes into the match between Ivory Coast and Tonga, the Ivorian winger Max Brito was crushed beneath several other players, leaving him paralysed below the neck.

3 June 1995

France	22–19	Scotland
Try: Ntamack; Con: Lacroix; Pen: Lacroix (5)		Try: Wainwright; Con: G. Hastings; Pen: G. Hastings (4)

Loftus Versfeld, Pretoria
Attendance: 39,000
Referee: Wayne Erickson (Australia)

== Knockout stage ==
Quarter-finals
10 June – Johannesburg
South Africa	42
Western Samoa	14
10 June – Durban
France	36
Ireland	12
11 June – Cape Town
England	25
Australia	22
11 June – Pretoria
New Zealand	48
Scotland	30

Semi-finals
17 June – Durban
South Africa	19
France	15
18 June – Cape Town
England	29
New Zealand	45

Final
24 June – Johannesburg
South Africa (a.e.t.)	15
New Zealand	12
Third place
22 June – Pretoria
France	19
England	9

=== Quarter-finals ===
10 June 1995

France	36–12	Ireland
Try: Saint-André 79' c Ntamack 80' m Con: Lacroix (1/2) 80'; Pen: Lacroix (8) 7', 19', 30', 40', 49', 51', 71', 73'	Report	Pen: Elwood (4) 4', 15', 23', 39'

Kings Park Stadium, Durban
Attendance: 20,000
Referee: Ed Morrison (England)

10 June 1995

South Africa	42–14	Western Samoa
Try: Williams (4); Rossouw; Andrews; Con: Johnson (3); Pen: Johnson (2)		Try: Tatupu; Nu'uali'itia; Con: Fa'amasino (2)

Ellis Park, Johannesburg
Attendance: 54,169
Referee: Jim Fleming (Scotland)

11 June 1995

England	25–22	Australia
Try: T. Underwood; Con: Andrew; Pen: Andrew (5); Drop: Andrew	Report	Try: Smith; Con: Lynagh; Pen: Lynagh (5)

Newlands, Cape Town
Attendance: 35,448
Referee: Dave Bishop (New Zealand)

11 June 1995

New Zealand	48–30	Scotland
Try: Little (2); Lomu; Mehrtens; Bunce; Fitzpatrick; Con: Mehrtens (6); Pen: Mehrtens (2)		Try: Weir (2); S. Hastings; Con: G. Hastings (3); Pen: G. Hastings (3)

Loftus Versfeld, Pretoria
Attendance: 28,000
Referee: Derek Bevan (Wales)

=== Semi-finals ===
17 June 1995

South Africa	19–15	France
Try: Kruger; Con: Stransky; Pen: Stransky (4)		Pen: Lacroix (5)

Kings Park Stadium, Durban
Attendance: 49,773
Referee: Derek Bevan (Wales)

18 June 1995

England	29–45	New Zealand
Try: Carling (2); R. Underwood (2); Con: Andrew (3); Pen: Andrew	Report	Try: Lomu (4); Kronfeld; Bachop; Con: Mehrtens (3); Pen: Mehrtens; Drop: Z. Brooke; Mehrtens

Newlands, Cape Town
Attendance: 43,414
Referee: Stephen Hilditch (Ireland)

=== Third-place play-off ===
22 June 1995

France	19–9	England
Try: Olivier Roumat; Ntamack; Pen: Lacroix (3)		Pen: Andrew (3)

Loftus Versfeld, Pretoria
Attendance: 44,000
Referee: Dave Bishop (New Zealand)

== Final ==
The final was contested by New Zealand and hosts South Africa. Both nations finished undefeated at the top of their pools. South Africa defeated Western Samoa in the quarter-finals, and then France in the semi-finals to reach the final; New Zealand defeated Scotland in the quarter-finals, and England in the semi-finals, a game in which Jonah Lomu famously scored four tries for the All Blacks. The final was played at Ellis Park in Johannesburg and refereed by Ed Morrison of England. To this point, New Zealand had led the tournament in production, outscoring their opponents 315–104, while South Africa had outscored their opponents 129–55. The tight Springbok defence would keep the high scoring All Blacks in check – particularly Jonah Lomu and Marc Ellis, who had already scored a then World Cup record seven tries each in the tournament – with neither team scoring a try in the match.

South Africa led 9–6 at half time, and New Zealand levelled the scores at 9–9 with a drop goal in the second half. Though Andrew Mehrtens almost kicked a late drop goal for the All Blacks, the score remained tied at full-time, forcing the game into extra time. Both teams scored penalty goals in the first half of extra time, but Joel Stransky then scored a drop goal to win the final for South Africa.

An iconic moment occurred after the game when Nelson Mandela, wearing a Springbok rugby jersey and cap, presented the Webb Ellis Cup to South African captain François Pienaar. The moment is thought by some to be one of the most famous finals of any sport.

24 June 1995

South Africa	15–12 (a.e.t.)	New Zealand
Pen: Stransky (3); Drop: Stransky (2)	Report	Pen: Mehrtens (3); Drop: Mehrtens

Ellis Park, Johannesburg
Attendance: 59,870
Referee: Ed Morrison (England)

== Statistics ==
The tournament's top point scorer was France's Thierry Lacroix, who scored 112 points. Marc Ellis and Jonah Lomu, both of New Zealand, scored the most tries, with seven each.

Top 10 point scorers
Player	Team	Position	Played	Tries	Conversions	Penalties	Drop goals	Total points
Thierry Lacroix	France	Fly-half	6	4	7	26	0	112
Gavin Hastings	Scotland	Full-back	4	5	14	17	0	104
Andrew Mehrtens	New Zealand	First five-eighth	5	1	14	14	3	84
Rob Andrew	England	Fly-half	5	0	5	20	3	79
Joel Stransky	South Africa	Fly-half	5	1	4	13	3	61
Michael Lynagh	Australia	Fly-half	3	2	5	9	0	47
Simon Culhane	New Zealand	First five-eighth	1	1	20	0	0	45
Neil Jenkins	Wales	Fly-half	3	0	7	8	1	41
Diego Domínguez	Italy	Fly-half	3	1	5	7	1	39
Marc Ellis	New Zealand	Wing	5	7	0	0	0	35
Jonah Lomu	New Zealand	Wing	5	7	0	0	0	35

== Broadcasters ==
The event was broadcast in Australia by Network Ten and in the United Kingdom by ITV.

== Commemorative coins ==
The South African Mint issued a one-ounce gold proof "Protea" coin with a total mintage of 406 pieces to commemorate the event being hosted by South Africa.

== Popular culture ==
Mandela and Pienaar's involvement in the World Cup is the subject of the John Carlin book Playing the Enemy: Nelson Mandela and the Game That Made a Nation, its 2009 film adaptation Invictus, and the ESPN TV documentary The 16th Man in 2010.
