= Ian Rogers (referee) =

- Born: 9 July 1957 Harding, KwaZulu-Natal, South Africa
- Died: 26 November 1998 (aged 41)

Rugby union career
Refereeing career
Years	Competition	Apps
1995	Rugby World Cup	
1993–1997	Test Matches	

Ian Rogers (9 July 1957 – 26 November 1998) was an international rugby union referee from South Africa. Before becoming a full-time referee, Rogers attended Maritzburg College – the same high school as fellow international rugby referee Craig Joubert. As one of South Africa's foremost referees of his time, Rogers represented his country as referee at the 1995 Rugby World Cup.

== Test Match Honour Roll ==
Rogers refereed a total of 10 international test matches during his career from 1993 to 1998. He is the 8th-most capped international rugby referee from South Africa, along with Freek Burger and Louis Mzomba.

Amongst other games, Rogers was referee in the following:

=== Test history ===
No.	Date	Teams		Notes
1.	22 May 1993	Zimbabwe	Wales	
2.	7 Jul 1993	Arabian Gulf	Zimbabwe	1995 Rugby World Cup Qualifier
3.	4 Jun 1994	Canada	France	
4.	11 Jun 1994	Canada	Wales	
5.	18 Jun 1994	Australia	Italy	
6.	25 Jun 1994	Australia	Italy	
7.	4 Jun 1995	(Republic of Ireland) Ireland	Wales	1995 Rugby World Cup
8.	16 Dec 1995	England	Samoa	
9.	31 May 1997	Argentina	England	

=== The British & Irish Lions ===
Rogers was the referee for the match between the Junior Springboks & The British & Irish Lions at the Boland Stadium on 17 June 1997.

== Recognition ==
In recognition of Rogers' achievements in rugby refereeing, his alma mater now awards the "Ian Rogers Trophy for the Most Competent Rugby Referee".
