= Tupo Fa'amasino =

Japan & Samoa international rugby union player

- Born: 13 April 1966 (age 60) Apia, Samoa
- Height: 6 ft 0 in (1.83 m)
- Weight: 209 lb (95 kg)

Rugby union career
- Position: Centre
Senior career
Years	Team	Apps	(Points)
1989-1991	Oriental Rongotai		
1993	NikoNikoDo		
2000	Otahuhu		
2006	East Tamaki RFC		
Provincial / State sides
Years	Team	Apps	(Points)
1989-91	Wellington	17	(20)
Super Rugby
Years	Team	Apps	(Points)
1996	Wellington Hurricanes		
International career
Years	Team	Apps	(Points)
1988-1996	Samoa	37	(36)
1993	Japan		
Coaching career
- Years: Team
- 2006: East Tamaki RFC

Tupo Fa'amasino (born 13 April 1966, in Apia) is a former Samoan rugby union player. He played as a centre.

== Career ==
His first match with Samoa was in the match against Wales at Cardiff, on 12 November 1988, during the 1988 Western Samoa tour in Wales. He was part of the 1991 and 1995 World Cups. He also played for Japan twice in the 1993 Japan tour in Argentina and Wales, in the match against Wales on 16 October 1993. His last international match for Samoa was in a test match against Fiji at Suva, on 20 July 1996.
