= Gordon Hamilton (rugby union) =

Irish rugby union player

Gordon Fredric Hamilton (born 13 May 1964 in Belfast) is a retired Irish rugby union player. He played as an open-side wing-forward.

Hamilton played for N.I.F.C., Howe Of Fife (Scotland), Ballymena and Ulster.

He won 10 caps for Ireland, from 1991 to 1992, scoring a single try. The most famous moment of his career came at the 1991 Rugby World Cup, when he scored a try in the last couple of minutes of Ireland's quarter-final against Australia to put Ireland ahead. However, Michael Lynagh scored at the other end to put Ireland out of the tournament.

Hamilton owned and ran a shipping and stevedoring business in Ireland before selling the group to J&J Denholm Group of Scotland in 2012.

Hamilton served as Chairman of the Professional Game Boards at Ulster Rugby and the Irish Rugby Football Union. Current Chairman of James Tolland & Company Limited, a grain and animal feed trading business, he continues to work on a voluntary basis for Campbell College Belfast.
