= Fata Sini =

Samoan rugby footballer (born 1966)

Personal information
- Full name: Iefata Sini
- Born: 24 December 1966 (age 59) Samoa

Playing information

Rugby union
- Position: Fly-half
Representative
Years	Team	Pld	T	G	FG	P
1995	Samoa	4	2	0	0	10

Rugby league
- Position: Wing
Club
Years	Team	Pld	T	G	FG	P
1995–97	Salford	58	28	11	0	134
1998–99	York	41	19	0	0	76
2000	Doncaster	30	17	0	0	68
2001	Workington Town	18	6	0	0	24
	Total	147	70	11	0	302

Iefata "Fata" Sini (born 24 December 1966) is a Samoan former professional rugby league, and international rugby union footballer. After representing Samoa in the 1995 Rugby Union World Cup, playing fly half, he was signed by English rugby league club Salford Reds. He also played for York, Doncaster and Workington Town.
