= Alejandro Allub =

Argentine rugby union player (born 1976)

- Born: December 1, 1976 (age 49)
- Height: 6 ft 5 in (1.96 m)
- Weight: 231 lb (105 kg)
- Occupation: Pediatric Cardiologist

Rugby union career
- Position: Lock
Senior career
Years	Team	Apps	(Points)
1996-2000	Jockey Club		
2000-2001	Perpignan		
2009-2013	Jockey Club		
Provincial / State sides
Years	Team	Apps	(Points)
1997-2000	Córdoba		
International career
Years	Team	Apps	(Points)
1997-2001	Argentina	29	(5)

Dr. Alejandro Allub (born 1 December 1976, Córdoba) is a former Argentine rugby union footballer. He played as a lock. He works as a pediatrician.

== Career ==
Allub played for Jockey Club, in Córdoba, Argentina, and for USA Perpignan, in France. He received 29 caps for Argentina, from 1997 to 2001, scoring 1 try, 5 points in aggregate. He was a member of the "Pumas" squad that participated at the 1999 Rugby World Cup finals, playing five matches and scoring the single try of his international career.

Allub had to leave high competition in 2001 after experiencing an acute myocardical infarction.
