= Darren Kellett =

Samoa international rugby union player

- Born: 27 September 1972 (age 54) Auckland, New Zealand
- Height: 5 ft 9 in (1.75 m)
- Weight: 198 lb (90 kg)

Rugby union career
- Position: Flyhalf
Senior career
Years	Team	Apps	(Points)
1994	Ardmore Marist RFC		
1995-96	Ponsonby RFC		
Provincial / State sides
Years	Team	Apps	(Points)
1994	Counties Manaukau	4	(39)
1995	Auckland	1	(0)
1998	Poverty Bay	7	(72)
International career
Years	Team	Apps	(Points)
1993–1995	Samoa	13	(137)

Darren James Kellett (born 27 September 1972 in Auckland) is a New Zealand-born Samoan rugby union player. He plays as a fly-half.

== Career ==
His first international cap was during a match against Tonga, at Nuku'alofa, on 29 May 1993. He was part of the 1995 Rugby World Cup roster, where he played two matches. His last international cap was during a match against England, at Twickenham, on 16 December 1995.
