= Niall Hogan =

Irish rugby union player

- Born: Niall Andrew Hogan; 20 April 1971 (age 55)
- Height: 1.73 m (5 ft 8 in)
- Weight: 79 kg (12 st 6 lb; 174 lb)
- School: Terenure College, Dublin
- University: Royal College of Surgeons in Ireland
- Occupation: Orthopaedic surgeon

Rugby union career
- Position: Scrum-half
Amateur team(s)
Years	Team	Apps	(Points)
-1997	Terenure College		
Senior career
Years	Team	Apps	(Points)
1997-1998	London Irish	16	(15)
Provincial / State sides
Years	Team	Apps	(Points)
-1997	Leinster		
International career
Years	Team	Apps	(Points)
1995-1997	Ireland	13	(5)

Niall Andrew Hogan (born 20 April 1971) is an Irish orthopaedic surgeon and a former Irish rugby union international player who played as a scrum-half. He played for the Ireland team from 1995 to 1997, winning 13 caps. He was a member of the Ireland squad at the 1995 Rugby World Cup where he played in three matches. Hogan is a former Ireland team captain.

== Education ==
Hogan graduated from the Royal College of Surgeons in Ireland (RCSI) in 1995 with a degree in medicine (MB BCh LRCP&SI). In 2005, he was conferred with the Intercollegiate Board Specialty Diploma in Trauma and Orthopaedic Surgery. Hogan is Honorary Secretary to the Irish Institute of Trauma and Orthopaedic Surgery. His brother Brian Hogan is a radiologist and fellow RCSI graduate.
