= Hiroyuki Kajihara =

Japan international rugby union player

- Born: 28 September 1966 (age 60) Yamanashi, Japan
- School: Hikawa High School, Yamanashi
- University: Tsukuba University

Rugby union career
- Position: Flanker
Amateur team(s)
Years	Team	Apps	(Points)
1981-1984	Hikawa High School		
1984-1988	Tsukuba University Rugby Football Club		
Senior career
Years	Team	Apps	(Points)
1988-1994	Toshiba		
1994-1997	Katsunuma Club		
International career
Years	Team	Apps	(Points)
1989–1997	Japan	31	(28)
Coaching career
- Years: Team
- 1997-2008: Katsura High School
- 2008-: Hikawa High School

Hiroyuki Kajihara (梶原宏之, Kajihara Hiroyuki) (born 28 September 1966 in Yamanashi, Japan) is a former rugby union footballer who played for Japan. Playing at flanker, Kajihara played 21 Tests for Japan between 1989 and 1997. He scored 19 points from his four tries. Kajihara played in both the 1991 and 1995 Rugby World Cups for Japan. He played three games in each World Cup including matches against Scotland, Ireland and the All Blacks.

== Coaching career ==
He coached the Katsura High School and then, the Hikawa High School, both teams from his hometown, Yamanashi.
