= Masanori Takura =

Japanese rugby union player

- Born: September 30, 1966 (age 60) Kyoto, Japan
- Height: 5 ft 10 in (1.78 m)
- Weight: 211 lb (96 kg)
- School: Higashiuji High School
- University: Kyoto Sangyo University

Rugby union career
- Position: Prop
Amateur team(s)
Years	Team	Apps	(Points)
1982-1985	Higashiuji High School		
1985-1989	Kyoto Sangyo University RFC		
Senior career
Years	Team	Apps	(Points)
1989-1996	Mitsubishi Sagamihara DynaBoars		
International career
Years	Team	Apps	(Points)
1989-1995	Japan	16	(5)

Masanori Takura (田倉政憲, Takura Masanori; born 30 September 1966 in Kyoto) is a Japanese rugby union prop.

== Biography ==
After graduating from Higashiuji High School and from Kyoto Sangyo University, in 1989, Takura joined Mitsubishi Sagamihara DynaBoars team. In that same year, he caught the eye of Hiroaki Shukuzawa who just became coach of the Japan national team, stating that "Takura is strong and stable in the scrum ". Takura debuted on 29 May 1989, in Tokyo against Scotland XV, where Japan won 28-24. Since then, in the "Shukuzawa Japan" era, he reigned as a firm right prop, winning a total of 16 caps. He also took part at the 1991 and 1995 Rugby World Cups.
