= José Cilley =

Argentine rugby union player (born 1972)

- Born: José Luis Cilley; December 28, 1972 (age 53) Buenos Aires
- Height: 5 ft 10 in (1.78 m)
- Weight: 176 lb (80 kg; 12.6 st)
- Notable relative: Jorge Cilley (grandfather)

Rugby union career
- Position: Fly-half
Senior career
Years	Team	Apps	(Points)
1990-2008	San Isidro Club		
International career
Years	Team	Apps	(Points)
1994-2002	Argentina	15	(138)

José Luis Cilley (born 28 December 1972) is an Argentine former Rugby union footballer. He played as a fly-half with the San Isidro Club. He is the grandson of Jorge Cilley, a former captain of the Pumas.

He had 15 caps for Argentina, from 1994 to 2002, scoring 2 tries, 31 conversions and 22 penalties, in an aggregate of 138 points. He was a member of Argentina squad at the 1995 Rugby World Cup finals, playing in two games and scoring a try, three conversions and five penalties, 26 points in aggregate, and at the 1999 Rugby World Cup finals, but this last time, he didn't play.
