= George Harder =

- Born: George Allan Harder; 22 June 1974 (age 52) Motoʻotua, Western Samoa
- Height: 6 ft 1 in (1.85 m)
- Weight: 227 lb (103 kg; 16.2 st)

Rugby union career
- Position(s): Wing, Centre
Amateur team(s)
Years	Team	Apps	(Points)
1995-1996	Te Atatu		
1996-1998	Waitemata		
Senior career
Years	Team	Apps	(Points)
2002-2003	Leeds	17	(15)
2003-2006	Harlequins	27	(30)
2006-2008	Stade Montois	23	(0)
Provincial / State sides
Years	Team	Apps	(Points)
1998-2001	Auckland	6	(15)
Super Rugby
Years	Team	Apps	(Points)
1998-2001	Auckland Blues		
International career
Years	Team	Apps	(Points)
1995	Samoa	4	(15)

George Harder (born 22 June 1974) is a Samoan former professional rugby union footballer of the 1990s and 2000s. He usually played at wing or centre

== Career ==
=== Club career ===
He played for Te Atatu and then, for Waitemata at club level and Auckland in New Zealand's domestic NPC tournament and for Auckland Blues in the then Super 12. Harder also had a spell with the Brisbane Broncos rugby league team.

He joined Leeds Tykes in 2002, and then Harlequins in the summer of 2003. He made his league debut in the 33-27 victory over London Wasps but suffered a knee ligament injury the following week that would keep him out of action for three months. Unfortunately his time at Quins has been disrupted by injury throughout. On 22 2004 he won the European Challenge Cup with the team: in the quarterfinals and semifinals against CA Brive and Connacht he scored only three tries (two in the quarterfinals), playing also in the final on 22 May 2004 against Montferrand (won 27:26). He finished his playing career at Stade Montois in Pro D2.

=== International career ===
He made his debut for the Samoa on 13 April 1995 in a test match in Johannesburg against South Africa. Played just 4 games, including 3 games in the 1995 World Cup, and scored 15 points thanks to 3 tries. The last game was played in the quarterfinals also against South Africa on 10 June, also played in Johannesburg. Taking into account unofficial matches against clubs and provincial representative teams, he played 28 tests for Samoa.

== Personal life ==
Harder played as wing and center and distinguished by his physical strength, which allowed him to overcome the enemy's defenses and make tries, as well as the desire to go to the tryline.
