= Rodrigo Crexell =

Argentine rugby union player (born 1968)

- Born: Rodrigo Hugo Crexell; February 5, 1968 (age 58) Santa Fe Province

Rugby union career
- Position: Scrum-half
Senior career
Years	Team	Apps	(Points)
1987-2004	CA Rosario		
International career
Years	Team	Apps	(Points)
1990-1995	Argentina	14	(32)

Rodrigo Hugo Crexell (born 5 February 1968 in Santa Fe Province) is a former Argentine rugby union player. He played as a scrum-half.

Crexell played for Club Atlético del Rosario, in the Argentine Championship.

He had 14 caps for Argentina, since the 20-18 win over Ireland, at 27 October 1990, in Dublin, in a friendly match, scoring 5 tries, 2 conversions and 1 penalty, 32 points on aggregate. He was called for the 1995 Rugby World Cup, playing in all the three matches and scoring a try. His last match was at the 52-37 win over Uruguay, at 8 October 1995, in Posadas, for the South American Rugby Championship, where he scored one of the eight tries of the "Pumas", in a hard-fought match.
