= Thierry Lacroix =

France international rugby union player (born 1967)

- Born: Thierry Lacroix; 2 March 1967 (age 59) Nogaro, France
- Height: 1.80 m (5 ft 11 in)
- Weight: 84 kg (185 lb)

Rugby union career
- Position: Flyhalf
Senior career
Years	Team	Apps	(Points)
- Dax
1995–1996	Sharks (Currie Cup)		
1997–1999	Harlequins	35	(237)
1999–2000	Saracens	19	(280)
2000–2002	Perpignan	14	(225)
2002–2004	Castres	7	(10)
International career
Years	Team	Apps	(Points)
1989–1997	France	43	(367)

Thierry Lacroix (French pronunciation: [tjɛʁi lakʁwa]; born 2 March 1967) is a former French rugby union footballer. He won 43 caps playing at fly-half for the French rugby union side. He made his international test debut in Strasbourg at the age of 22 on 4 November 1989, coming on as a replacement for the injured Didier Camberabero against Australia. He was part of the winning side at the 1993 Five Nations Championship. He won his final cap for France on 22 November 1997 against South Africa. Lacroix played in the 1991 Rugby World Cup - a tournament in which the French team was beaten in the quarter-final stage by the eventual losing finalist, England - and again in the 1995 Rugby World Cup in which he was the top points scorer with 112 points. France finished the 1995 tournament in 3rd place, defeating a fellow losing semi finalist, England, in the 3rd / 4th place playoff game.

Lacroix started his rugby career at US Dax in the French Ligue Nationale de Rugby. After the 1995 Rugby World Cup in South Africa, he joined Sharks in South Africa where he helped them to two Currie Cups in 1995 and 1996. He then left South Africa for England where he played for Harlequin F.C. and Saracens F.C. In 2000 he left Saracens to join USA Perpignan in France just as Thomas Castaignède signed to take up a position. Lacroix, a qualified physiotherapist, wanted to work in this domain and only played part-time rugby for Perpignan. He finished his rugby playing career at Castres Olympique at the age of 37.
