= Eddie Halvey =

Irish rugby union player

- Born: Edward Oliver Halvey; 11 August 1970 (age 56) Limerick, Ireland
- Height: 1.93 m (6 ft 4 in)
- Weight: 108 kg (17.0 st; 238 lb)

Rugby union career
- Position: Flanker
Amateur team(s)
Years	Team	Apps	(Points)
- Shannon
Senior career
Years	Team	Apps	(Points)
1995–2000	Munster	32	(25)
2000–2002	London Irish	34	(20)
2002–2004	Munster	18	(0)
- Correct as of 15 September 2011
International career
Years	Team	Apps	(Points)
1995–1997	Ireland	8	(10)
- Correct as of 15 September 2011

Eddie Halvey (born 11 August 1970) is a retired Irish rugby union player for Munster, London Irish and Ireland. He played as a flanker. On 12 May 2009 he received a 7-month suspended sentence for causing the death of Kevin Walsh, then 16, in 2006 while driving at over twice the legal limit.

== Munster ==
Halvey made his debut for Munster against Swansea in November 1995, a game that was also Munster's first ever Heineken Cup appearance.

== London Irish ==
He joined the Exiles in 2000, and made his debut against Harlequins in August of that year. He started in the 2002 Powergen Cup Final at Twickenham, as London Irish defeated the Northampton Saints.

== Return to Munster ==
In 2002 Halvey rejoined Munster, and went on to play a further two season with his home province, making his final appearance against Cardiff Blues in April 2004.

== Ireland ==
Halvey made his Ireland debut against France in March 1995, during the 1995 Five Nations Championship. He earned three caps at the 1995 Rugby World Cup in South Africa, against Japan, Wales and France. The first of his two international tries came during the Japan match, and the second came four days later during the game against Wales. Halvey's last appearance for Ireland came against Canada in November 1997.
