= Tu Nu'uali'itia =

Samoa international rugby union player

- Born: Toetu Nu'uali'itia; 22 June 1966 (age 60) Auckland, New Zealand
- Height: 5 ft 7 in (1.70 m)
- Weight: 188 lb (85 kg)

Rugby union career
- Position: Scrum-half
Amateur team(s)
Years	Team	Apps	(Points)
1990-1991	Patumahoe		
1992	Glenfield		
1993-1996	Te Atatu		
Senior career
Years	Team	Apps	(Points)
1998-1999	West Hartlepool	22	(15)
Provincial / State sides
Years	Team	Apps	(Points)
1990-1991	Counties Manukau	24	(24)
1992	North Harbour	6	(5)
1993-1996	Auckland	16	(15)
International career
Years	Team	Apps	(Points)
1991-1996	Samoa	8	(5)

Toetu "Tu" Nu'uali'itia (born 12 June 1971 in Auckland) is a New Zealand-born Samoan former rugby union player. He played as a scrum-half.

== Biography ==
Born into a Samoan family, he is the youngest of five children. Starting to take up rugby in elementary school, throughout his career he played in the National Provincial Championship for Counties Manukau, North Harbour and Auckland (under the coaching of Graham Henry).

== Career ==
He played in two Rugby World Cups for Western Samoa in the 1990s. In 1991 he was part of the Samoa squad that memorably beat Wales 16-13 at the Cardiff Arms Park in what is still one of the biggest upsets in international rugby. However, he did not play any match of the tournament. His first match for Western Samoa was in the test match against Tonga at Moamoa, on 4 June 1994. In the 1995 World Cup quarter-finals he scored a try at Ellis Park against the eventual winners, South Africa. His last match for Samoa was against the New Zealand at Napier, on 7 June 1996.

Following his retirement, he worked for the Auckland and Manukau Health Council and joined the private Oceania Career Academy, teaching management skills to Māori and Pacific Islander students. He collaborates with Sport Waitakere, Westforce Credit Union Operations Manager and is correspondent for 2K Plus International Sports Media and Radio Rhema.

== Personal life ==
He professes Christianity and claims that it had a great influence on his life and career. He is married, has two sons and a daughter.
