= Shem Tatupu =

Samoa international rugby union & league player

Personal information
- Full name: Shem J. Tatupu
- Born: 18 February 1968 (age 58) Apia, Samoa

Playing information

Rugby union
- Position: Flanker
Club
Years	Team	Pld	T	G	FG	P
1993–1995	Ponsonby RFC, Auckland	18	3	0	0	20
1997–98	Northampton Saints	25	3	0	0	15
	Total	43	6	0	0	35
Representative
Years	Team	Pld	T	G	FG	P
1990–95	Samoa	10	3	0	0	15

Rugby league
- Position: Prop
Club
Years	Team	Pld	T	G	FG	P
1996	Wigan	4	0	0	0	0

Shem Tatupu (born 18 February 1968) is a former rugby league and rugby union footballer. He made his début for Samoa in 1990, and represented the country in the 1995 Rugby Union World Cup. He switched to rugby league to sign for Wigan, playing for the club in the inaugural Super League season before returning to rugby union and signing for Northampton Saints.
