= Ko Izawa =

Japan international rugby union player

- Born: July 16, 1970 (age 56) Kanagawa, Japan
- Height: 6 ft 3 in (1.91 m)
- Weight: 248 lb (112 kg)
- School: Sagamidai Technical High School, Sagamihara
- University: Daito Bunka University

Rugby union career
- Position: Flanker
Amateur team(s)
Years	Team	Apps	(Points)
- Sagamidai Technical High School
1991-1995	Daito Bunka University		
Senior career
Years	Team	Apps	(Points)
1989-1991	Ricoh		
1995-1998	Tokyo Gas		
1998-2002	Sanyo		
International career
Years	Team	Apps	(Points)
1995-1998	Japan	17	(30)

Ko Izawa (井沢航, Izawa Kō), known also as Ko Nakamura (中村 航, Nakamura Kō) or Kozo Nakamura (中村航三, Nakamura Kōzō) (born Kanagawa, 16 July 1970) is a former Japanese rugby union player who played as a flanker.

== Career ==
Originally from Kanagawa, Izawa was educated at Daito Bunka University, where he played between 1991 and 1995. Izawa also played for Ricoh, Tokyo Gas and Sanyo in the Japan Company Rugby Championship. Izawa was first called up for Japan by the then-head coach Osamu Koyabu in 1995, playing his first match against Tonga, in Nagoya, on 11 February 1995. He was also part of the 1995 Rugby World Cup squad, where he played two matches. His last cap was against Korea, in Bangkok, on 18 December 1998.
