= Ipolito Fenukitau =

Tongan rugby union footballer

- Born: 22 July 1972 (age 54) Tonga
- Height: 6 ft 2 in (188 cm)
- Weight: 227 lb (103 kg; 16 st 3 lb)

Rugby union career
- Position: Flanker
Amateur team(s)
Years	Team	Apps	(Points)
1993–1996	Queanbeyan Whites		
Senior career
Years	Team	Apps	(Points)
2003–2006	Ricoh Black Rams		
2006–2007	Yamaha Jubilo		
2007–2008	Kintetsu Liners		
Provincial / State sides
Years	Team	Apps	(Points)
1993–1996	ACT Kookaburras		
Super Rugby
Years	Team	Apps	(Points)
1996–00	Brumbies	55	(60)
International career
Years	Team	Apps	(Points)
1993–2003	Tonga	18	(15)
National sevens team
Years	Team		Comps
1998	Australia 7s		
Medal record
Men's rugby sevens
Representing Australia
Commonwealth Games
Bronze medal – third place	1998 Kuala Lumpur	Team competition

Ipolito Fenukitau (born 22 July 1972) is a Tongan rugby union footballer. He has played over 10 times for the Tonga national rugby union team, including representing them at the 1995 Rugby World Cup in South Africa and 2003 Rugby World Cup in Australia. His usual position is at flanker.

Fenukitau made his debut for Tonga on 5 June 1993 in a match against a non-cap Scottish XV, in which he featured in the starting lineup. He played in three other matches that year; against Fiji, Australia and again against Fiji. In 1995 he played in two Tests against Japan, and was then included in the 1995 Rugby World Cup squad for South Africa, playing in two games against France and Scotland.

In 1998 he played for the Australian sevens team at the Commonwealth Games.

In 2002 he played two Tests for Tonga; against Fiji and Samoa, and the following year he was included in the 2003 Rugby World Cup squad for Australia, playing in all four pool games for Tonga.
