= Silao Leaega =

Samoan rugby union player and coach

- Born: Silao Leaegailesolo; 24 June 1973 (age 53) Apia, Samoa
- Height: 5 ft 11 in (1.80 m)
- Weight: 209 lb (95 kg)

Rugby union career
- Position: Wing
Amateur team(s)
Years	Team	Apps	(Points)
–	Massey		
1995–97	Suburbs		
1997–1999	Waitakere		
Senior career
Years	Team	Apps	(Points)
1999–2001	Rugby Bologna		
2001–2003	Rugby Reggio		
2003–2004	Rugby Parma		
2004–2006	Rugby Rovigo		
2006–2009	Petrarca Rugby		
2009–2010	Riviera Rugby		
2010–11	Rugby Reggio		
2011–16	Lupi di Canolo		
Provincial / State sides
Years	Team	Apps	(Points)
1997	Auckland		
1997–1999	North Harbour	7	(32)
International career
Years	Team	Apps	(Points)
1997–2002	Samoa	19	(145)
Coaching career
- Years: Team
- 2011–16: Lupi di Canolo
- 2016–: Rugby Parma

Silao Leaegailesolo, shortened as Leaega (born 24 June 1973) is a former Samoan rugby union player and now coach. He played as a wing.

== Career ==
He first started to play for Samoa during a match against Tonga, at Apia, on 28 June 1997. He was part of the 1999 Rugby World Cup roster, where he played 2 matches and made 62 points, scoring 2 tries, 10 penalty kicks and 11 conversion kicks. With the Manu Samoa, he made 19 caps and 160 points, scoring 3 tries, 31 penalty kicks and 26 penalty kicks. His last cap for Samoa was against South Africa, at Pretoria, on 6 July 2002. In New Zealand, he played for North Harbour at the NPC. After the 1999 Rugby World Cup, Leaega moved to Italy, playing for Rugby Bologna 1928 (with which he won the promotion to the top division). Then he played for Rugby Reggio and then, he moved for Parma. Between 2004 and 2006, he played for Rugby Rovigo, while later he played for Petrarca.

Later, he spent a season playing for Riviera, to then return to Reggio Rugby in the 2010–11 season, during which the team conquered the A2 championship and the right to play the play-offs for the promotion to Eccelenza against Calvisano.

He had the role as player and coach for Lupi di Canolo, rugby team of the town of Correggio in the Serie C regional championship for 5 seasons, to then return to Parma as coach.
