= Ed Morrison (rugby union) =

Ed Morrison OBE
- Born: Edward Francis Morrison; 6 September 1951 (age 75) Bristol, England

Rugby union career
Refereeing career
| Years | Competition | Apps |
| 1995 | Rugby World Cup | |

Edward Francis Morrison (born 6 September 1951) is a former English rugby union referee. He refereed the 1995 Rugby World Cup final. In 1998 he became England's first full-time professional referee. He was given an award by the International Rugby Board for distinguished service in 2001.

Morrison first retired from refereeing in 2003. He was involved with the Bristol Referees' Society, then the RFU and PRO12. He was appointed as manager of England's elite referees in 2008. He stepped down as head of the elite referees in 2013 just before the Aviva Premiership season started.

He was appointed as PRO12's Referee Commissioner in 2014, and he was appointed an Officer of the Order of the British Empire (OBE) in the 2018 New Year Honours list "for services to rugby union".
