= David Corkery =

Irish rugby union player

Sean David Corkery (born 6 November 1972 in Cork, Ireland) is a retired Irish rugby union player. In his career (playing at blind-side wing-forward) he played for Cork Constitution, Munster and Bristol, as well as winning 27 caps for Ireland between 1994 and 1999.
