= Argentina at the Rugby World Cup =

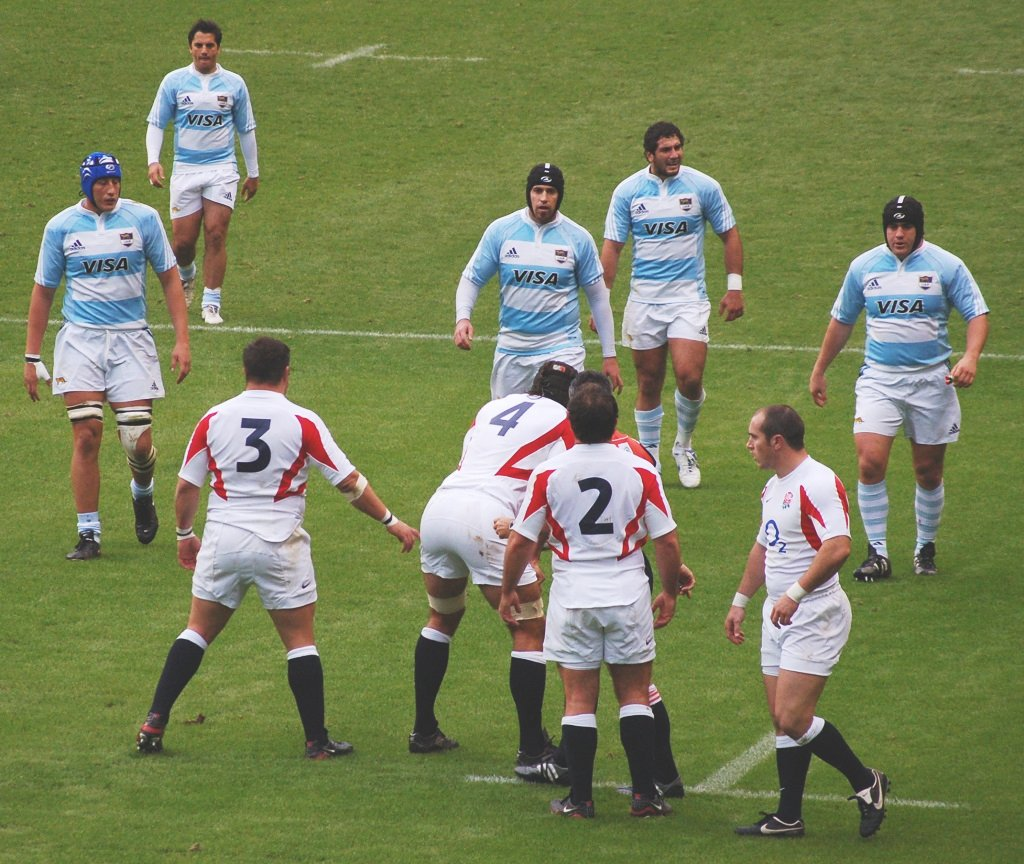
The Pumas during their November 2006 win over England at Twickenham

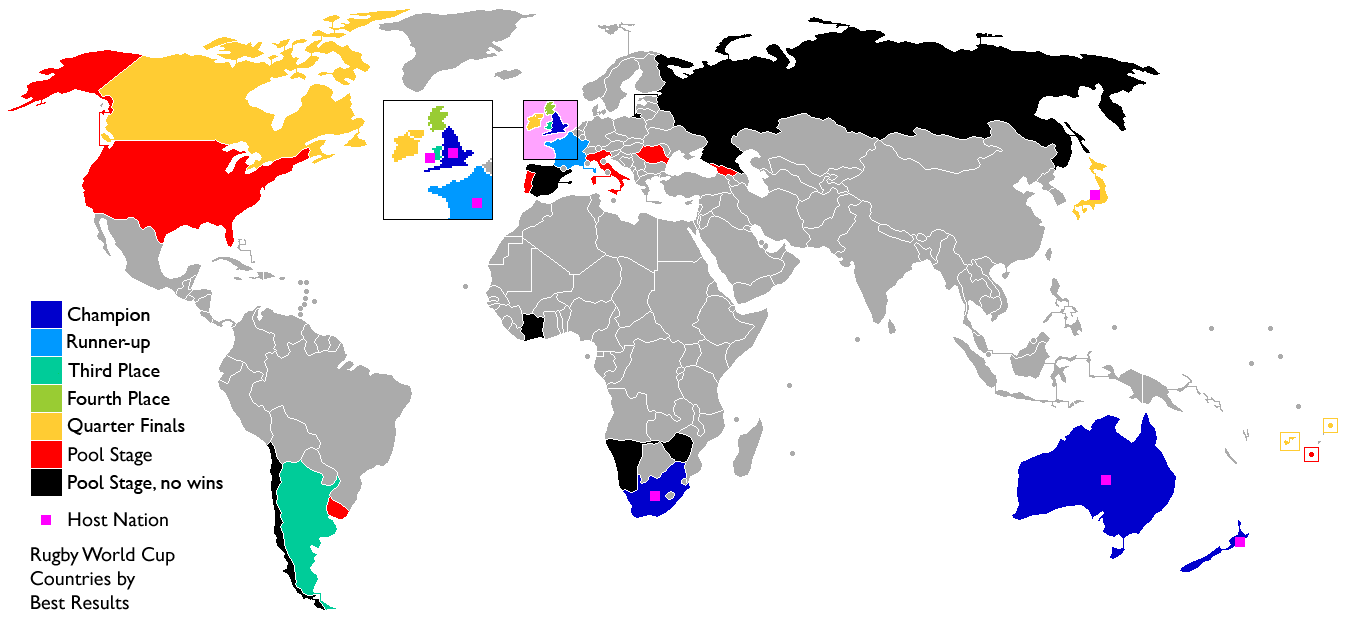
Map of nations best results, excluding nations which unsuccessfully participated in qualifying tournaments

Argentina have competed in all the Rugby World Cup tournaments, starting with the inaugural 1987 tournament.

Their best result was finishing in third place in the 2007 tournament, played in France. They defeated the host side France in their opening game, then beat the other teams in Pool D, finishing top of the pool. In the knockout stage, they defeated Scotland in the quarter-finals, before losing in the semi-finals to eventual champions South Africa. In the Bronze Final they once again faced France, whom they defeated for a second time to attain third place.

Their second best result was fourth place in 2015. They also progressed past the pool stage in 1999 and 2011. In 1999 they defeated Ireland in the quarter-final play-offs, but lost in the quarter-finals to France. In 2011 they lost to host team New Zealand in the quarter-finals.

Argentina has yet to host the World Cup. The Argentina national team is the most successful of any national side from the Americas at the tournament.

== By position ==
Rugby World Cup record									Qualification						
Year	Round	Pld	W	D	L	PF	PA	Squad	Pos	Pld	W	D	L	PF	PA
(New Zealand) (Australia) 1987	Pool stage	3	1	0	2	49	90	Squad	Invited						
(England) (France) (Ireland) (Scotland) (Wales) 1991	Pool stage	3	0	0	3	38	83	Squad	2nd	4	2	0	2	57	46
(South Africa) 1995	Pool stage	3	0	0	3	69	87	Squad	P/O	5	5	0	0	184	53
(Wales) 1999	Quarter-finals	5	3	0	2	137	122	Squad	1st	3	3	0	0	161	52
(Australia) 2003	Pool stage	4	2	0	2	140	57	Squad	Automatically qualified						
(France) 2007	Third place	7	6	0	1	209	93	Squad	1st	2	2	0	0	86	13
(New Zealand) 2011	Quarter-finals	5	3	0	2	100	73	Squad	Automatically qualified						
(England) 2015	Fourth place	7	4	0	3	250	143	Squad	Automatically qualified						
(Japan) 2019	Pool stage	4	2	0	2	106	91	Squad	Automatically qualified						
(France) 2023	Fourth place	7	4	0	3	185	156	Squad	Automatically qualified						
(Australia) 2027	Qualified								Automatically qualified						
(United States) 2031	To be determined								To be determined						
Total	—	48	25	0	23	1283	995	—	—	14	12	0	2	488	164
Champions; Runners–up; Third place; Fourth place; Home venue

== By matches ==
=== 1987 ===
Team	Pld	W	D	L	PF	PA	PD	T	Pts	Qualification
New Zealand	3	3	0	0	190	34	+156	30	6	Knockout stage
Fiji	3	1	0	2	56	101	−45	6	2 (Note: Fiji qualified for the highest number of tries (Fiji 6, Italy 5, Argentina 4))	Knockout stage
Italy	3	1	0	2	40	110	−70	5	2	
Argentina	3	1	0	2	49	90	−41	4	2	

Notes:

24 May 1987

Argentina	9–28	Fiji
Try: Penalty try Con: Porta; Pen: Porta	Report	Try: Gale; Naivilawasa; Nalaga; Savai; Con: Koroduadua (2); Rokowailoa; Pen: Koroduadua (2)

Rugby Park, Hamilton
Attendance: 13,000
Referee: Jim Fleming (Scotland)

28 May 1987

Argentina	25–16	Italy
Try: Lanza; Gómez; Con: Porta; Pen: Porta (5)	Report	Try: Innocenti; Cuttitta; Con: Collodo; Pen: Collodo (2)

Lancaster Park, Christchurch
Attendance: 2,000
Referee: Roger Quittenton (England)

1 June 1987

New Zealand	46–15	Argentina
Try: Kirk; Brooke; Stanley; Earl; Crowley; Whetton; Con: Fox (2); Pen: Fox (6)		Try: Lanza; Con: Porta; Pen: Porta (3)

Athletic Park, Wellington
Attendance: 30,000
Referee: Roger Quittenton (England)

=== 1991 ===
Pool 3 games -

Team	Pld	W	D	L	PF	PA	PD	Pts
Australia	3	3	0	0	79	25	+54	6
Western Samoa	3	2	0	1	54	34	+20	4
Wales	3	1	0	2	32	61	−29	2
Argentina	3	0	0	3	38	83	−45	0

4 October 1991

Argentina	19 – 32	Australia
Tries: Teran (2); Con: Del Castillo; Pen: Del Castillo; Drop: Arbizu (2)		Tries: Campese (2), Horan (2), Kearns; Con: Lynagh (3); Pen: Lynagh (2)

Stradey Park, Llanelli
Referee: Dave Bishop (New Zealand)

9 October 1991

Wales	16 – 7	Argentina
Tries: Arnold; Pen: Ring (3), Rayer		Tries: García Simón; Pen: Del Castillo

Cardiff Arms Park, Cardiff
Referee: Rene Hourquet (France)

13 October 1991

Argentina	12 – 35	Western Samoa
Tries: Teran; Con: Arbizu; Pen: Laborde, Arbizu		Tries: Tagaola (2), Lima (2), Bunce, Bachop; Con: Vaea (4); Pen: Vaea

Sardis Road, Pontypridd
Referee: Brian Anderson (Scotland)

=== 1995 ===
Pool B games -

Team	Pld	W	D	L	PF	PA	PD	Pts
England	3	3	0	0	95	60	+35	9
Western Samoa	3	2	0	1	96	88	+8	7
Italy	3	1	0	2	69	94	−25	5
Argentina	3	0	0	3	69	87	−18	3

27 May 1995

Argentina	18 – 24	England
Tries: Lisandro Arbizu, Patricio Noriega; Con: Lisandro Arbizu; Pen: Lisandro Arbizu (2)		Pen: Rob Andrew (6); Drop: Rob Andrew (2)

Kings Park Stadium, Durban
Attendance: 30 000
Referee: Jim Fleming (Scotland)

30 May 1995

Western Samoa	32 – 26	Argentina
Tries: Pat Lam, George Leaupepe, George Harder; Con: Darren Kellett; Pen: Darren Kellett (5)		Tries: Penalty try, Rodrigo Crexell; Con: José Cilley (2); Pen: José Cilley (4)

Basil Kenyon Stadium, East London
Attendance: 11 000
Referee: Dave Bishop (New Zealand)

4 June 1995

Argentina	25 – 31	Italy
Tries: Matias Corral, Rolando Martín, José Cilley; Con: José Cilley; Pen: José Cilley		Tries: Paolo Vaccari, Mario Gerosa, Diego Dominguez; Con: Diego Dominguez (2); Pen: Diego Dominguez (4)

Basil Kenyon Stadium, East London
Attendance: 11 000
Referee: Clayton Thomas (Wales)

=== 1999 ===
Pool D games

Team	Pld	W	D	L	PF	PA	PD	Pts
Wales	3	2	0	1	118	71	+47	7
Samoa	3	2	0	1	97	72	+25	7
Argentina	3	2	0	1	83	51	+32	7
Japan	3	0	0	3	36	140	−104	3

1 October 1999

Wales	23 – 18	Argentina
Tries: Colin Charvis, Mark Taylor; Con: Neil Jenkins (2); Pen: Neil Jenkins (3)		Pen: Gonzalo Quesada (6)

Millennium Stadium, Cardiff
Referee: Paddy O'Brien (New Zealand)

10 October 1999

Argentina	32 – 16	Samoa
Tries: Alejandro Allub; Pen: Gonzalo Quesada (8); Drop: Gonzalo Quesada		Tries: Peter Paramore; Con: Silao Leaega; Pen: Silao Leaega (3)

Stradey Park, Llanelli
Referee: Wayne Erickson (Australia)

16 October 1999

Argentina	33 – 12	Japan
Tries: Diego Albanese, Agustín Pichot; Con: Felipe Contepomi; Pen: Gonzalo Quesada (7)		Pen: Keiji Hirose (4)

Millennium Stadium, Cardiff
Referee: Stuart Dickinson (Australia)

Quarter final place offs -

20 October 1999

Ireland	24 – 28	Argentina
Pen: David Humphreys (7); Drop: David Humphreys		Tries: Diego Albanese; Con: Gonzalo Quesada; Pen: Gonzalo Quesada (7)

Stade Félix Bollaert, Lens
Attendance: 41,320
Referee: Stuart Dickinson (Australia)

Quarter finals -

24 October 1999

France	47 – 26	Argentina
Tries: Xavier Garbajosa (2), Philippe Bernat-Salles (2), Émile Ntamack; Con: Christophe Lamaison (5); Pen: Christophe Lamaison (4)		Tries: Agustín Pichot, Lisandro Arbizu; Con: Gonzalo Quesada (2); Pen: Gonzalo Quesada (3), Felipe Contepomi

Lansdowne Road, Dublin
Attendance: 50,000
Referee: Derek Bevan (Wales)

=== 2003 ===
Group A games -

Team	Pld	W	D	L	PF	PA	PD	BP	Pts	Qualification
Australia	4	4	0	0	273	32	+241	2	18	Quarter-finals
Ireland	4	3	0	1	141	56	+85	3	15	Quarter-finals
Argentina	4	2	0	2	140	57	+83	3	11	
Romania	4	1	0	3	65	192	−127	1	5	
Namibia	4	0	0	4	28	310	−282	0	0	

10 October 2003

Australia	24–8	Argentina
Try: Sailor 20', Roff 74'; Con: Flatley; Pen: Flatley (4)		Try: Corleto 72'; Pen: M. Contepomi

Telstra Stadium, Sydney
Attendance: 81,350
Referee: Paul Honiss (New Zealand)

14 October 2003

Argentina	67–14	Namibia
Tries: Méndez, Bouza (2), J. Fernández Miranda, Penalty try (2), Gaitán (3), N. Fernández Miranda; Con: Quesada (7); Pen: Quesada		Tries: Grobier, Husselman; Con: Wessels (2)

Bluetongue Central Coast Stadium, Gosford
Attendance: 17,887
Referee: Nigel Whitehouse (Wales)

22 October 2003

Argentina	50–3	Romania
Tries: Gaitán, Hernández (2), M. Contepomi, N. Fernández Miranda, Bouza (2); Con: J. Fernández Miranda (4), Quesada (2); Pen: J. Fernández Miranda		Pen: Tofan

Sydney Football Stadium, Sydney
Attendance: 33,673
Referee: Chris White (England)

26 October 2003

Argentina	15–16	Ireland
Pen: Quesada (3); Drop: Quesada, Corleto		Tries: Quinlan; Con: Humphreys; Pen: Humphreys, O'Gara (2)

Adelaide Oval
Attendance: 30,203
Referee: André Watson (South Africa)

=== 2007 ===
Los Pumas began their final preparation for the 2007 World Cup with a two-test series against visiting Ireland, who was grouped against them in France. In the first test on 26 May at Santa Fe, they scored a 22–20 win on a last-minute drop goal by Felipe Contepomi. Both teams were heavily experimental, especially the Irish, with stars such as Brian O'Driscoll, Ronan O'Gara, Paul O'Connell and Gordon D'Arcy missing from the touring squad. The Pumas were themselves missing many stars who were playing that weekend in the final round of the 2006–07 Top 14 season in France. The second test against Ireland was a 16-0 Pumas win at Vélez Sársfield on 2 June. On 9 June, Los Pumas completed a clean sweep of their mid-year tests with a 24–6 win over Italy in Mendoza. They split their final warmup tests, defeating neighbours Chile 70–14 at CASI in Buenos Aires on 4 August and losing to Wales at Millennium Stadium 27–20 on 18 August.

At the World Cup, Los Pumas were drawn into the so-called pool of death, featuring two other teams ranked in the top six in the IRB rankings—Ireland and the hosts France. On top of this, they opened the World Cup at Stade de France against the French, marking the third consecutive World Cup in which they played against the host nation in the World Cup opener. In possibly one of their finest hours, the Pumas took a 17–9 lead into the half, and held on for a surprising 17–12 win. The Pumas subsequently beat Georgia 33–3 on 11 September at the Stade de Gerland, Lyon. Argentina then went on to beat Namibia 63–3 in Marseille, the biggest winning margin in Argentine World Cup history. They then went on to secure a 30–15 victory against Ireland which ensured that they topped the group. They then defeated Scotland 19–13 in the quarter-final at the Stade de France. The Pumas' improbable run towards the Webb Ellis trophy ended in a comprehensive 37–13 defeat by the Springboks in the semi-final at Stade de France. However, the Pumas recovered to beat France for the second time in the 2007 Rugby World Cup, a 34–10 win in the 3rd/4th place playoff. The 3rd place showing for the Pumas in the 2007 World Cup was Argentina's best ever result in Rugby World Cup history, equal or better to the best showing by IRB founding nations Wales (who were 3rd in the 1987 Rugby World Cup), Scotland (who were 4th in the 1991 Rugby World Cup) and Ireland (which has never qualified for the Rugby World Cup semi-finals).

During their World Cup run, the normally football-crazed Argentines embraced the Pumas so much that El Superclásico, the Buenos Aires football derby between Boca Juniors and River Plate that is normally the biggest event in Argentine sport, was rescheduled so that it would not conflict with the Pumas' quarter-final match. As the only major Spanish language country in the 2007 Rugby World Cup, the Pumas also had considerable support from rugby fans in Spain, Uruguay, and other Latin American countries during their impressive five-game winning streak.

Group stage

Pos	Team	Pld	W	D	L	PF	PA	PD	B	Pts	Qualification
1	Argentina	4	4	0	0	143	33	+110	2	18	Qualified for the quarter-finals
2	France	4	3	0	1	188	37	+151	3	15	Qualified for the quarter-finals
3	Ireland	4	2	0	2	64	82	−18	1	9	Eliminated, automatic qualification for RWC 2011
4	Georgia	4	1	0	3	50	111	−61	1	5	
5	Namibia	4	0	0	4	30	212	−182	0	0	

7 September 2007
21:00

France	12–17	Argentina
Pen: Skrela (4/5) 7', 31', 40+', 60'	Report	Try: Corleto 27' m Pen: F. Contepomi (4/6) 5', 10', 24', 34'

Stade de France, Saint-Denis
Attendance: 79,312
Referee: Tony Spreadbury (England)

11 September 2007
20:00

Argentina	33–3	Georgia
Tries: Borges (2) 47' c, 56' m Albacete 72' m Martin Aramburu 80' c Con: F. Contepomi (1/3); Hernández (1/1); Pen: F. Contepomi (3/3) 12', 35', 54'	Report	Pen: Kvirikashvili (1/2) 2'

Stade de Gerland, Lyon
Attendance: 40,240
Referee: Nigel Owens (Wales)

22 September 2007
21:00

Argentina	63–3	Namibia
Tries: Roncero 25' c Leguizamón (2) 35' m, 52' c M. Contepomi 38' c F. Contepomi 45' c Tiesi 55' m Corleto 58' m Penalty try 63' c Todeschini 71' c Con: Contepomi (4/7); Todeschini (2/2); Pen: F. Contepomi (2/2) 10', 20'	Report	Pen: Schreuder (1/1) 7'

Stade Vélodrome, Marseille
Attendance: 55,067
Referee: Stuart Dickinson (Australia)

30 September 2007
17:00

Ireland	15–30	Argentina
Tries: O'Driscoll 32' c Murphy 47' m Con: O'Gara (1/2); Pen: O'Gara (1/1) 20'	Report	Tries: Borges 17' m Agulla 39' c Con: F. Contepomi (1/2); Pen: F. Contepomi (3/4) 43', 62', 66'; Drop: Hernández (3/5) 21', 36', 79'

Parc des Princes, Paris
Attendance: 45,450
Referee: Paul Honiss (New Zealand)

Quarter-finals -

7 October 2007
21:00

Argentina	19–13	Scotland
Try: Longo Elía 33' c Con: F. Contepomi (1/1); Pen: F. Contepomi (3/4) 23', 29', 43'; Drop: Hernández (1/4) 54'	Report	Try: Cusiter 63' c Con: Paterson (1/1); Pen: Parks (1/2) 16'; Paterson (1/1) 38'

Stade de France, Saint-Denis
Attendance: 76,866
Referee: Joël Jutge (France)

Semi-finals -

14 October 2007
21:00

South Africa	37–13	Argentina
Tries: du Preez 7' c Habana (2) 32' c, 76' c Rossouw 40' c Con: Montgomery (4/4); Pen: Montgomery (3/3) 17', 71', 75'	Report	Try: M. Contepomi 45' c Con: F. Contepomi (1/1); Pen: F. Contepomi (2/4) 15', 30'

Stade de France, Saint-Denis
Attendance: 77,055
Referee: Steve Walsh (New Zealand)

Bronze final game -

19 October 2007
21:00

France	10–34	Argentina
Try: Poitrenaud 69' c Con: Beauxis (1/1); Pen: Élissalde (1/1) 18'	Report	Tries: F. Contepomi (2) 28' c, 77' c Hasan Jalil 32' c Martín Aramburú 53' m Corleto 65' m Con: F. Contepomi (3/5); Pen: F. Contepomi (1/1) 21'

Parc des Princes, Paris
Attendance: 45,958
Referee: Paul Honiss (New Zealand)

=== 2011 ===
Pos	Team	Pld	W	D	L	PF	PA	PD	T	B	Pts	Qualification
1	England	4	4	0	0	137	34	+103	18	2	18	Advanced to the quarter-finals and qualified for the 2015 Rugby World Cup
2	Argentina	4	3	0	1	90	40	+50	10	2	14	Advanced to the quarter-finals and qualified for the 2015 Rugby World Cup
3	Scotland	4	2	0	2	73	59	+14	4	3	11	Eliminated but qualified for 2015 Rugby World Cup
4	Georgia	4	1	0	3	48	90	−42	3	0	4	
5	Romania	4	0	0	4	44	169	−125	3	0	0	

10 September 2011
20:30

Argentina	9–13	England
Pen: Contepomi (1/2) 7'; Rodríguez (2/7) 20', 45'	Report	Try: Youngs 67' c Con: Wilkinson (1/1); Pen: Wilkinson (2/7) 12', 75'

Otago Stadium, Dunedin
Attendance: 30,700
Referee: Bryce Lawrence (New Zealand)

17 September 2011
15:30

Argentina	43–8	Romania
Try: Fernández 5' c Leguizamón 9' c Figallo 21' m González Amorosino 30' c Imhoff 64' c Fessia 72' c Con: Rodríguez (5/6); Pen: Rodríguez (1/3) 44'	Report	Try: Cazan 32' m Pen: Dimofte (1/2) 14'

Rugby Park Stadium, Invercargill
Attendance: 12,605
Referee: Steve Walsh (Australia)

25 September 2011
20:30

Argentina	13–12	Scotland
Try: González Amorosino 73' c Con: Contepomi (1/1); Pen: Contepomi (2/5) 19', 64'	Report	Pen: Paterson (1/2) 35'; Jackson (1/1) 38'; Drop: Jackson (1/1) 65'; Parks (1/2) 72'

Wellington Regional Stadium, Wellington
Attendance: 26,937
Referee: Wayne Barnes (England)

2 October 2011
13:00

Argentina	25–7	Georgia
Try: Imhoff 32' m Contepomi 68' c Gosio 79' c Con: Contepomi (1/2); Bosch (1/1); Pen: Contepomi (2/4) 51', 60'	Report	Try: Khmaladze 39' c Con: Urjukashvili (1/1)

Arena Manawatu, Palmerston North
Attendance: 13,754
Referee: Alain Rolland (Ireland)

Quarter-finals

9 October 2011
20:30 NZDT (UTC+13)

New Zealand	33–10	Argentina
Try: Read 69' m Thorn 79' c Con: Cruden (1/1); Pen: Weepu (7/7) 13', 26', 36', 40', 50', 59', 73'	Report	Try: Farías Cabello 32' c Con: Contepomi (1/1); Pen: Bosch (1/1) 46'

Eden Park, Auckland
Attendance: 57,192
Referee: Nigel Owens (Wales)

=== 2015 ===
Pos	Team	Pld	W	D	L	PF	PA	PD	T	B	Pts	Qualification
1	New Zealand	4	4	0	0	174	49	+125	25	3	19	Advanced to the quarter-finals and qualified for the 2019 Rugby World Cup
2	Argentina	4	3	0	1	179	70	+109	22	3	15	Advanced to the quarter-finals and qualified for the 2019 Rugby World Cup
3	Georgia	4	2	0	2	53	123	−70	5	0	8	Eliminated but qualified for 2019 Rugby World Cup
4	Tonga	4	1	0	3	70	130	−60	8	2	6	
5	Namibia	4	0	0	4	70	174	−104	8	1	1	

20 September 2015
16:45

New Zealand	26–16	Argentina
Try: A. Smith 57' c Cane 67' c Con: Carter (2/2) 58', 67'; Pen: Carter (4/4) 5', 11', 19', 40'	Report	Try: Petti 21' c Con: Sánchez (1/1) 23'; Pen: Sánchez (3/3) 30', 38', 43'

Wembley Stadium, London
Attendance: 89,019
Referee: Wayne Barnes (England)

25 September 2015
16:45

Argentina	54–9	Georgia
Try: Lavanini 10' m Cubelli 47' c Imhoff (2) 49' c, 76' m Cordero (2) 53' c, 72' c Landajo 70' c Con: Sánchez (3/4) 48', 51', 54'; Bosch (2/3) 71', 74'; Pen: Sánchez (2/2) 21', 35'; Drop: Sánchez 6'	Report	Pen: Kvirikashvili (3/3) 17', 20', 32'

Kingsholm, Gloucester
Attendance: 14,256
Referee: JP Doyle (England)

4 October 2015
14:30

Argentina	45–16	Tonga
Try: Tuculet 20' c Imhoff 22' c Sánchez 64' m Montoya 72' c Cordero 80' c Con: Sánchez (4/5) 21', 23', 73', 80'; Pen: Sánchez (4/5) 18', 26', 44', 53'	Report	Try: Morath 7' m Tongaʻuiha 38' m Con: Morath (0/2); Pen: Morath (2/4) 33', 42'

Leicester City Stadium, Leicester
Attendance: 29,124
Referee: Jaco Peyper (South Africa)

11 October 2015
12:00

Argentina	64–19	Namibia
Try: Hernández 7' c Moroni 19' c Agulla 24' c Isa 36' m Noguera Paz 40' c Alemanno 49' c Senatore 64' c Montoya 69' c Cubelli 74' c Con: González Iglesias (4/5) 8', 20', 26', 40'; Socino (4/4) 50', 65', 70', 75'; Pen: González Iglesias (1/2) 12'	Report	Try: Tromp 13' c Greyling 46' c Jantjies 80' m Con: Kotzé (2/2) 14', 47'; Redelinghuys (0/1)

Leicester City Stadium, Leicester
Attendance: 30,198
Referee: Pascal Gaüzère (France)

Quarter-finals

18 October 2015
13:00 BST (UTC+01)

Ireland	20–43	Argentina
Try: Fitzgerald 26' c Murphy 44' c Con: Madigan (2/2) 27', 45'; Pen: Madigan (2/4) 20', 53'	Report	Try: Moroni 3' c Imhoff (2) 10' c, 73' c Tuculet 69' c Con: Sánchez (4/4) 5', 10', 70', 74'; Pen: Sánchez (5/6) 13', 22', 51', 64', 77'

Millennium Stadium, Cardiff
Attendance: 72,316
Referee: Jérôme Garcès (France)

Semi-finals

25 October 2015
16:00 GMT (UTC+00)

Argentina	15–29	Australia
Pen: Sánchez (5/5) 7', 24', 36', 45', 55'	Report	Try: Simmons 2' c Ashley-Cooper (3) 10' c, 32' m, 72' c Con: Foley (3/4) 3', 11', 73'; Pen: Foley (1/2) 48'

Twickenham Stadium, London
Attendance: 80,025
Referee: Wayne Barnes (England)

Bronze final game -

30 October 2015
20:00 GMT (UTC+00)

South Africa	24–13	Argentina
Try: Pietersen 6' c Etzebeth 43' m Con: Pollard (1/2) 7'; Pen: Pollard (4/5) 14', 33', 40', 48'	Report	Try: Orlandi 80' c Con: Sánchez (1/1) 80'; Pen: Sánchez (1/1) 52'; Drop: Sánchez 42'

Olympic Stadium, London
Attendance: 55,925
Referee: John Lacey (Ireland)

=== 2019 ===
Pos	Team	Pld	W	D	L	PF	PA	PD	T	B	Pts	Qualification
1	England	4	3	1	0	119	20	+99	17	3	17	Advanced to the quarter-finals and qualified for the 2023 Rugby World Cup
2	France	4	3	1	0	79	51	+28	9	1	15	Advanced to the quarter-finals and qualified for the 2023 Rugby World Cup
3	Argentina	4	2	0	2	106	91	+15	14	3	11	Eliminated but qualified for 2023 Rugby World Cup
4	Tonga	4	1	0	3	67	105	−38	9	2	6	
5	United States	4	0	0	4	52	156	−104	7	0	0	

21 September 2019
16:15 JST (UTC+09)

France	23–21	Argentina (1 BP)
Try: Fickou 18' c Dupont 22' c Con: Ntamack (2/2) 19', 23'; Pen: Ntamack (2/3) 30', 40+1'; Drop: Lopez (1/1) 70'	Report	Try: Petti 42' c Montoya 54' m Con: Sánchez (1/2) 43'; Pen: Sánchez (1/1) 15'; Urdapilleta (2/2) 61', 69'

Tokyo Stadium, Chōfu
Attendance: 40,004
Referee: Angus Gardner (Australia)

28 September 2019
13:45 JST (UTC+09)

(1 BP) Argentina	28–12	Tonga
Try: Montoya (3) 7' c, 17' c, 26' c Carreras 20' c Con: Urdapilleta (4/4) 9', 19', 21', 28'	Report	Try: Veainu (2) 30' c, 66' m Con: Takulua (1/2) 32'

Hanazono Rugby Stadium, Higashiōsaka
Attendance: 21,971
Referee: Jaco Peyper (South Africa)

5 October 2019
17:00 JST (UTC+09)

(1 BP) England	39–10	Argentina
Try: May 9' m Daly 35' m Youngs 40'+1 m Ford 45' c Nowell 74' c Cowan-Dickie 80' c Con: Farrell (3/6) 47', 76', 80+1'; Pen: Farrell (1/1) 54'	Report	Try: Moroni 71' c Con: Boffelli (1/1) 72'; Pen: Urdapilleta (1/1) 7'

Tokyo Stadium, Chōfu
Attendance: 48,185
Referee: Nigel Owens (Wales)

9 October 2019
13:45 JST (UTC+09)

(1 BP) Argentina	47–17	United States
Try: Sánchez 19' c Tuculet (2) 25' c, 35' m Mallia (2) 44' c, 48' c de la Fuente 57' c Bertranou 71' c Con: Sánchez (5/6) 21', 25', 45', 49', 57'; Urdapilleta (1/1) 72'	Report	Try: Scully (2) 39' m, 80+3' m Lasike 60' c Con: MacGinty (1/2) 61'

Kumagaya Rugby Stadium, Kumagaya
Attendance: 24,377
Referee: Paul Williams (New Zealand)

=== 2023 ===
Pos	Team	Pld	W	D	L	PF	PA	PD	TF	TA	B	Pts	Qualification
1	England	4	4	0	0	150	39	+111	17	3	2	18	Advance to knockout stage, and qualification to the 2027 Men's Rugby World Cup
2	Argentina	4	3	0	1	127	69	+58	15	5	2	14	Advance to knockout stage, and qualification to the 2027 Men's Rugby World Cup
3	Japan	4	2	0	2	109	107	+2	12	14	1	9	Qualification to the 2027 Men's Rugby World Cup
4	Samoa	4	1	0	3	92	75	+17	11	7	3	7	
5	Chile	4	0	0	4	27	215	−188	4	30	0	0	

Source: World Rugby
Rules for classification: Pool stage tiebreakers

9 September 2023	England	27–10	Argentina	Stade de Marseille, Marseille
22 September 2023	Argentina	19–10	Samoa	Stade Geoffroy Guichard, Saint-Étienne
30 September 2023	Argentina	59–5	Chile	Stade de la Beaujoire, Nantes
8 October 2023	Japan	27–39	Argentina	Stade de la Beaujoire, Nantes

Quarter Final

14 October 2023
17:00 CEST (UTC+2)

Wales	17–29	Argentina
Try: Biggar 14' c T. Williams 57' c Con: Biggar (2/2) 16', 58'; Pen: Biggar (1/2) 21'	Report	Try: Sclavi 68' c Sánchez 77' c Con: Boffelli (2/2) 69', 78'; Pen: Boffelli (4/5) 39', 45', 44', 48'; Sánchez (1/1) 80'

Stade de Marseille, Marseille
Attendance: 62,576
Referee: Karl Dickson (England)
(for Jaco Peyper (South Africa))

Semi-final

20 October 2023
21:00 CEST (UTC+2)

Argentina	6–44	New Zealand
Pen: Boffelli (2/2) 5', 35'	Report	Try: Jordan (3) 11' c, 62' m, 73' m J. Barrett 17' m Frizell (2) 40+2' m, 49' c Smith 42' c Con: Mo'unga (3/7) 12', 43', 50'; Pen: Mo'unga (1/1) 38'

Stade de France, Saint-Denis
Attendance: 77,653
Referee: Angus Gardner (Australia)

Bronze final

27 October 2023
21:00 CEST (UTC+2)

Argentina	23–26	England
Try: Cubelli 36' c S. Carreras 42' c Con: Boffelli (2/2) 37', 43'; Pen: Boffelli (2/2) 24', 50'; Sánchez (1/2) 68'	Report	Try: Earl 8' c Dan 44' c Con: Farrell (2/2) 9', 45'; Pen: Farrell (4/4) 3', 13', 30', 65'

Stade de France, Saint-Denis
Attendance: 77,674
Referee: Nic Berry (Australia)

== Overall record ==
Against	Played	Win	Draw	Lost	For	Against	Win %
Australia	3	0	0	3	42	85	0%
England	5	0	0	5	70	129	0%
Fiji	1	0	0	1	9	28	0%
France	4	2	0	2	98	92	50%
Georgia	3	3	0	0	112	19	100%
Ireland	4	3	0	1	116	75	75%
Italy	2	1	0	1	50	47	50%
Japan	2	2	0	0	72	39	100%
Namibia	3	3	0	0	194	36	100%
New Zealand	4	0	0	4	45	149	0%
Romania	2	2	0	0	93	11	100%
Samoa	4	2	0	2	89	93	50.00%
Scotland	2	2	0	0	32	25	100%
South Africa	2	0	0	2	26	61	0%
Tonga	2	2	0	0	73	28	100%
United States	1	1	0	0	47	17	100%
Wales	3	1	0	2	54	56	33%
Overall	47	24	0	23	1222	1010	51.50%

== Team records ==
Most points in a tournament

- 250 (2015 in England)
- 209 (2007 in France)
- 185 (2023 in France)

Most points in a game

- 67 vs Namibia (2003)
- 64 vs Namibia (2015)
- 63 vs Canada (2007)

Biggest winning margin

- 60 vs Namibia (2007)
- 54 vs Chile (2023)
- 53 Vs Namibia (2003)

Highest score against

- 47 vs France (1999)
- 46 vs New Zealand (1987)
- 44 vs New Zealand (2023)

Biggest losing margin

- 38 vs New Zealand (2023)
- 31 vs New Zealand (1987)
- 29 vs England (2019)

Most tries in a tournament

- 27 (2015 in England)
- 23 (2007 in France)
- 19 (2023 in France)

Most tries in a game

- 10 vs Namibia (2003)
- 9 vs Namibia (2007)
- 9 vs Namibia (2015)

== Individual records ==
Most appearances

- 22 Agustin Creevy (New Zealand 2011,England 2015,Japan 2019,France 2023)
- 20 Mario Ledesma (Wales 1999,Australia 2003,France 2007,New Zealand 2011)
- 18 Felipe Contepomi (Wales 1999,Australia 2003,France 2007,New Zealand 2011)
- 18 Martin Scelzo (Wales 1999,Australia 2003,France 2007,New Zealand 2011)
- 17 Matias Alemanno (England 2015,Japan 2019,France 2023)
- 17 Julian Montoya (England 2015,Japan 2019,France 2023)
- 17 Guido Petti (England 2015,Japan 2019,France 2023)

Most points overall

- 156 Nicolás Sánchez (New Zealand 2011,England 2015,Japan 2019, France 2023)
- 135 Gonzalo Quesada (Wales 1999,Australia 2003)
- 122 Felipe Contepomi (Wales 1999,Australia 2003,France 2007,New Zealand 2011)
- 79 Emiliano Boffelli (Japan 2019, France 2023)
- 35 Juan Imhoff (New Zealand 2011,England 2015,France 2023)

Most points in a game

- 27 vs Samoa - Gonzalo Quesada (Wales 1999)
- 25 vs Ireland - Nicolás Sánchez (England 2015)
- 23 vs Ireland - Gonzalo Quesada (Wales 1999)
- 23 vs Romania - Nicolás Sánchez (England 2015)
- 21 vs Japan - Gonzalo Quesada (Wales 1999)

Most tries overall

- 7 Juan Imhoff (New Zealand 2011,England 2015,France 2023)
- 6 Julian Montoya (England 2015,Japan 2019,France 2023)
- 4 Pablo Bouza (Australia 2003)
- 4 Felipe Contepomi (Wales 1999,Australia 2003,France 2007,New Zealand 2011)
- 4 Ignacio Corleto (Wales 1999,Australia 2003,France 2007)
- 4 Nicolás Sánchez (New Zealand 2011,England 2015,Japan 2019, France 2023)
- 4 Joaquin Tuculet (England 2015,Japan 2019)

Most tries in a game

- 3 vs Namibia - Martin Gaitan (Australia 2003)
- 3 vs Tonga - Julian Montoya (Japan 2019)
- 3 vs Japan - Mateo Carreras (France 2023)

Most penalty goals overall

- 35 Gonzalo Quesada (Wales 1999,Australia 2003)
- 26 Nicolás Sánchez (New Zealand 2011,England 2015,Japan 2019, France 2023)
- 25 Felipe Contepomi (Wales 1999,Australia 2003,France 2007,New Zealand 2011)

Most penalty goals in a game

- 8 vs Samoa - Gonzalo Quesada (Wales 1999)
- 7 vs Ireland - Gonzalo Quesada (Wales 1999)
- 7 vs Japan - Gonzalo Quesada (Wales 1999)

== Hosting ==
So far Argentina has not hosted any World Cup games, as no RWC has been held in the Americas yet.
