= Ravenhill Stadium =

Stadium in Belfast

Affidea Stadium
- Ravenhill

- Location within Greater Belfast
- Location: 85 Ravenhill Park, Belfast, Northern Ireland
- Coordinates: 54°34′35″N 5°54′16″W
- Owner: Irish Rugby Football Union
- Capacity: 18,196 (9,000 seated)
- Surface: Artificial Turf
- Public transit: Lanyon Place railway station

Construction
- Opened: 1923
- Renovated: 2009 and 2012/14

Tenant
- Ulster Rugby

Ravenhill Stadium (known as the Affidea Stadium for sponsorship reasons from July 2025, formerly known as the Kingspan Stadium) is a rugby stadium located in Belfast, Northern Ireland. It is the home of Ulster Rugby. With the opening of a new stand for the 2014 Heineken Cup quarter-final against Saracens on 5 April 2014, the capacity of the stadium is now 18,196. The stadium is owned by the Irish Rugby Football Union.

== History ==
Up until the 1920s, Ulster and Ireland played games at the Royal Ulster Agricultural Society grounds in Belfast. In 1923 the IRFU purchased Ravenhill rugby ground, formerly the home of Cooke RFC, for £2,300, and built a stand holding 3,500 spectators at a cost of £15,500, designed by Belfast architects Henry Hobart and Samuel Heron. It was inaugurated on 12 January 1924 with a 14-6 Ulster win over Leinster, and soon afterwards, on 9 February 1924, hosted Ireland's 3-14 defeat to England. A memorial arch, dedicated to Irish rugby players killed in World War I and World War II, was erected at the entrance and dedicated in 1926.

Ravenhill has been the annual venue for the Ulster Schools Cup final since 1924, which is traditionally contested on St Patrick's Day. The stadium is traditionally the venue for the Ulster Towns Cup, played on Easter Monday.

Ravenhill has hosted 18 international matches, including pool games in both the 1991 and 1999 Rugby World Cups. The most recent Ireland international played at the stadium was on 24 August 2007 against Italy in a warm-up match for the 2007 Rugby World Cup. Prior to that match, Scotland was the last visitor in the 1954 Five Nations Championship. Ravenhill also hosted the 2007 Under 19 Rugby World Championship final in which New Zealand defeated South Africa.

Ravenhill hosted memorable Ulster games in the Heineken Cup. Ulster beat Toulouse 15–13 at Ravenhill in the quarter-finals of the 1998–99 Heineken Cup. Ravenhill then hosted the 1998–99 Heineken Cup semi-final in which Ulster defeated Stade Français 33–27. The most memorable moment in that game was when out half David Humphreys ran from the Ulster 10-metre line to score a try.

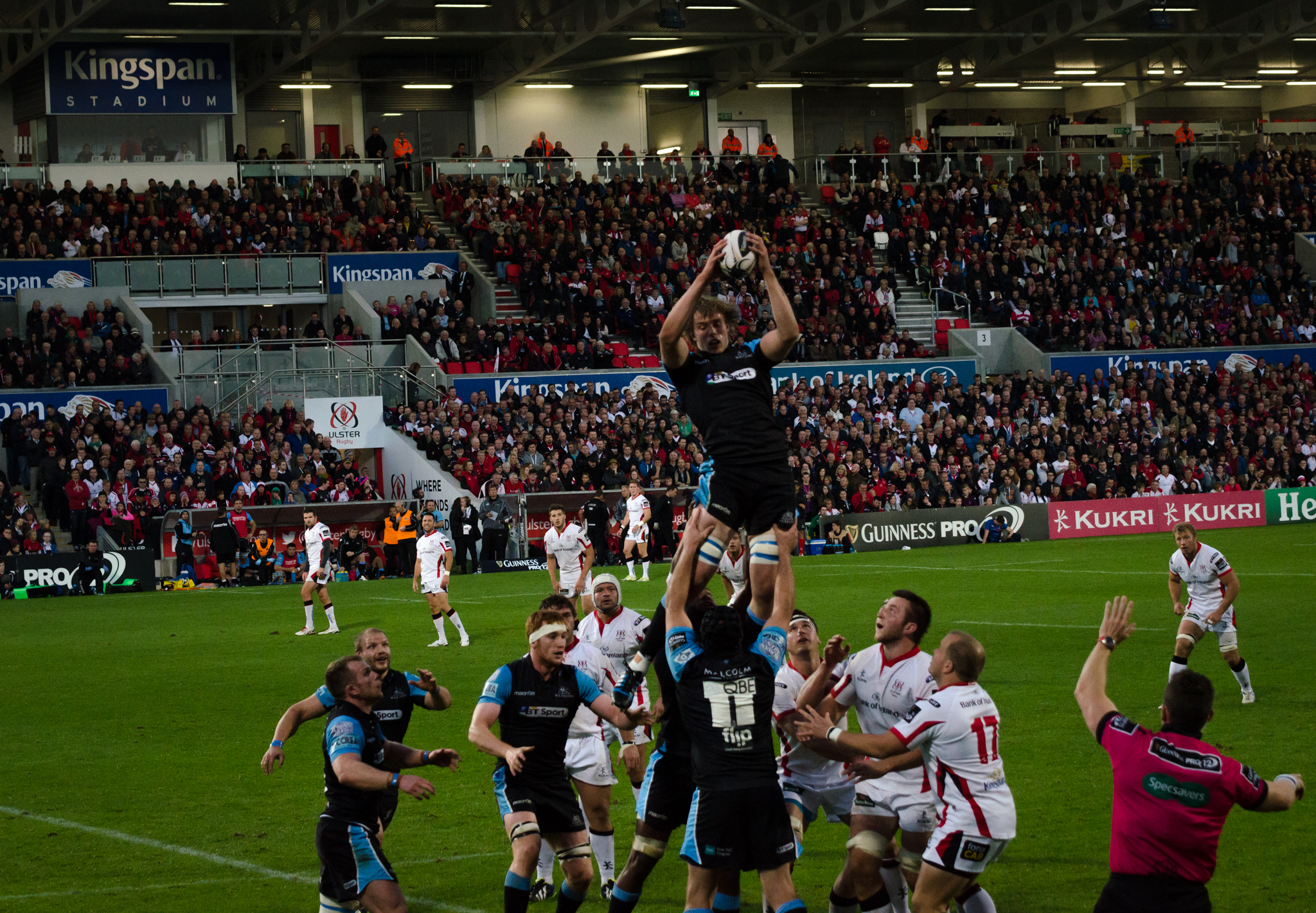
Ulster v Glasgow Warriors in October 2014 with the redeveloped main stand in the background.

On 30 May 2015, the 2015 Pro12 Grand Final was played at the Kingspan Stadium. Glasgow Warriors beat Munster 31–13.

On 26 August 2017, the 2017 Women's Rugby World Cup Final was played at the Kingspan Stadium. New Zealand beat England 41–32. The semi-final matches and some play-off matches of the Women's Rugby World Cup were also played at the stadium.

A 3G artificial playing surface was installed ahead of the 2023-24 season, in place of the original grass pitch.

=== American Football ===
In 1942, Ravenhill was the scene of the first game of American football ever played on the island of Ireland, played between teams representing service and artillery units of the United States Army stationed in Northern Ireland during World War II before an audience of more than 8000.

In 2022, Ravenhill hosted Shamrock Bowl XXXIV, the annual championship of American Football Ireland. UCD defeated Dublin Rebels in the game by a score of 52-24 to secure their first Shamrock Bowl title.

=== 2009 Redevelopment ===
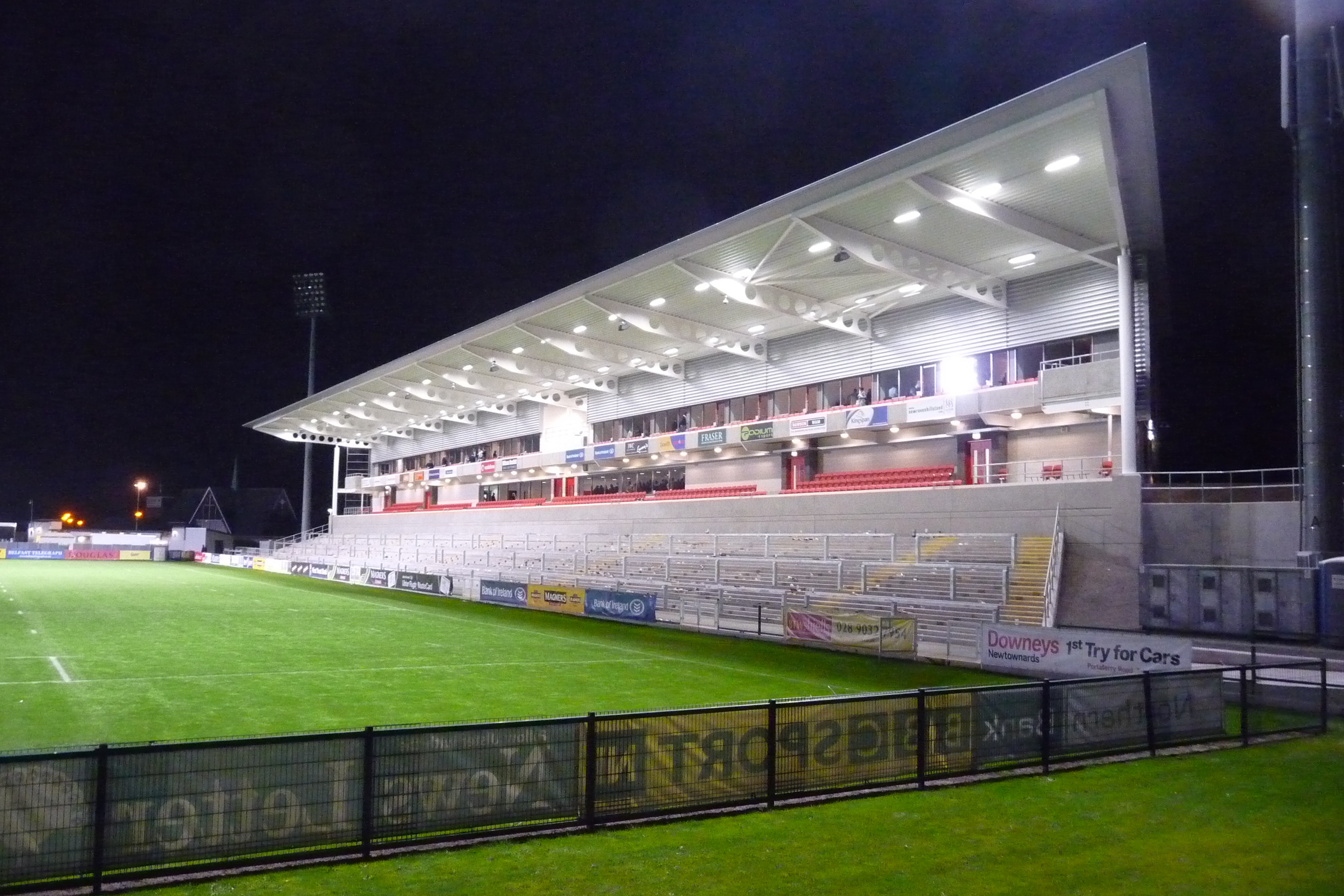
East Terrace and Premium Stand post 2009 renovations

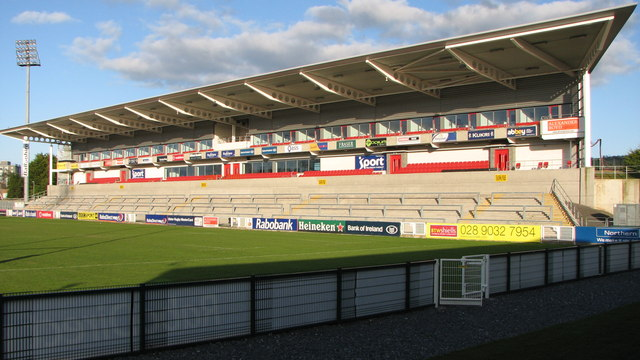
East terrace and Premium Stand post 2009 renovations

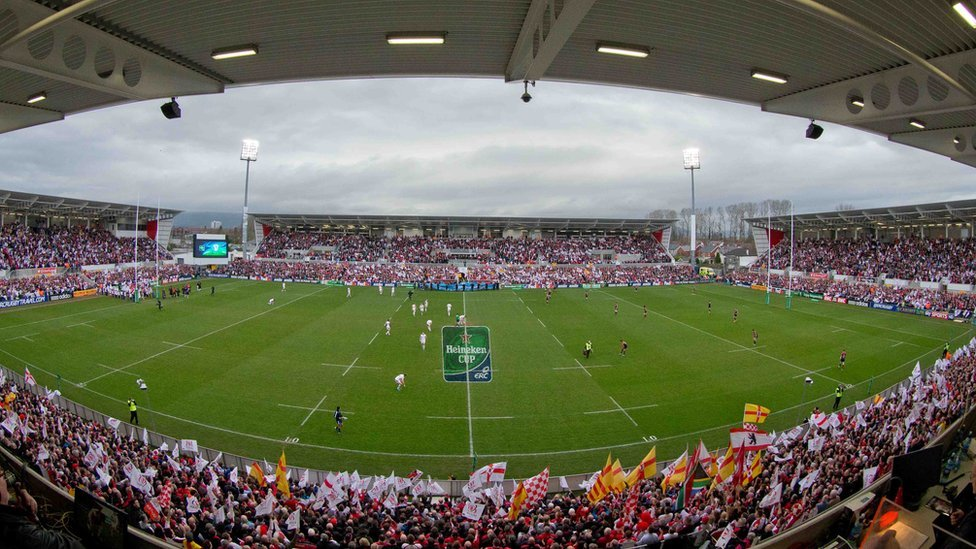
Ravenhill post both redevelopments during a 2015 Heineken cup match

The new stand at Ravenhill was officially opened on 9 October 2009 by First Minister Peter Robinson, before a match between Ulster and Bath Rugby. The stand has however been in use since the first home match of the 2009–2010 season, against Edinburgh Rugby.

The stand is on the Mount Merrion side of the ground, and consists of a terraced area, over 500 premium seats, and 20 corporate boxes. The terraced area is now covered by a roof for the first time in the stadium's history. The cost of the project is approximately £4.5 million, and has been funded by a mixture of public-sector funding, sales of premium tickets and boxes, and loans from the IRFU.

=== 2012–2014 Redevelopment ===
In 2011, the Northern Ireland Executive announced that it had granted £138m for various stadium redevelopment projects throughout Northern Ireland. Ulster Rugby received £14.5m, which was used to redevelop Ravenhill and expand its capacity from 12,000 to 18,000.

In 2012, Ulster Rugby confirmed that three new stands would be built at Ravenhill, with work commencing in late 2012. Two new stands at the Memorial and Aquinas ends of the stadium were completed while the main stand was demolished and rebuilt. The major refurbishment was completed in April 2014.

=== Sponsorship ===
On 5 June 2014, Ulster signed a 10-year contract with the Kingspan Group for the naming rights to Ravenhill, meaning that the stadium would be known as the Kingspan Stadium until 2024. As the sponsorship deal approached its end, Kingspan agreed to extend it for a further year to allow Ulster time to find a new sponsor. In July 2025, Ulster signed a new stadium naming rights deal with healthcare provider Affidea.

== Ireland Internationals ==
Ireland Senior Test Matches
Date	Competition	Home	Away	Score	Attendance	Report
9 February 1924	Five Nations	Ireland	England	3–14	15,000	
14 March 1925	Five Nations	Ireland	Wales	19–3		
23 January 1926	Five Nations	Ireland	France	11–0	20,000	
28 January 1928	Five Nations	Ireland	France	12–8	20,000	
9 March 1929	Five Nations	Ireland	Wales	5–5		
25 January 1930	Five Nations	Ireland	France	0–5	25,000	
14 March 1931	Five Nations	Ireland	Wales	3–15	30,000	
11 March 1933	Home Nations	Ireland	Wales	10–5		
9 March 1935	Home Nations	Ireland	Wales	9–3	35,000	
3 April 1937	Home Nations	Ireland	Wales	5–3	20,000	
11 March 1939	Home Nations	Ireland	Wales	0–7	28,000	
13 March 1948	Five Nations	Ireland	Wales	6–3	32,000	
11 March 1950	Five Nations	Ireland	Wales	3–6		
24 January 1953	Five Nations	Ireland	France	16–3	38,000	
27 February 1954	Five Nations	Ireland	Scotland	6–0		
24 August 2007	2007 Rugby World Cup warm-up matches	Ireland	Italy	23–20	14,100	

Ireland's Record at the Ravenhill
Competition	Played	Won	Drawn	Lost	% Won
Test Match	1	1	0	0	100%
Home/Five Nations	15	9	1	5	60%
Total	16	10	1	5	62.5%
This table does not include the results of the Ireland Wolfhounds, Ireland A, Ireland B or the Ireland U25 sides.

Updated 21 April 2021

Ireland Uncapped International Matches
Date	Competition	Home	Away	Score	Attendance	Report
4 December 1982		Ireland B	England B	6–10		
22 December 1990		Ireland B	Scotland B	16–0		
26 November 1997		Ireland A	Canada	26–10		
1 December 1998	1998 South Africa tour of Britain and Ireland	Ireland A	South Africa	19–50	10,000	
28 December 1998		Ireland U25	Italy	21–16		
7 November 2000	2000 Japan tour of Europe	Ireland U25	Japan	83–13		
16 February 2001		Ireland A	France A	23–55		
13 November 2001	2001 New Zealand rugby union tour	Ireland A	New Zealand XV	30–43		
1 March 2002		Ireland A	Scotland A	60–3		
7 March 2003		Ireland A	France A	19–29		
9 February 2007		Ireland A	England A	5–32	3,528	
13 November 2009	2009 end-of-year rugby union internationals	Ireland A	Tonga	48–19	3,777	
5 February 2010		Ireland Wolfhounds	Scotland A	34–19	2,746	
4 February 2011		Ireland Wolfhounds	England A	20–11	2,000	

== Rugby World Cup Matches ==
14 October 1991

Japan	52–8	Zimbabwe
Try: Horikoshi; Kutsuki (2); Mashuho (2); Yoshida (2); Matsuo; Luaiufi; Con: Hosokawa (5); Pen: Hosokawa	(Report)	Try: Tsimba; Nguruve

Attendance: 9,000
Referee: Rene Hourquet (France)

3 October 1999

Australia	57–9	Romania
Try: Horan 2' m Kefu (3) 7' c, 25' c, 78' c Little 41' m Roff (2) 43' c, 48' m Paul 64' c Burke 67' c Con: Eales; Burke (5)	(Report)	Pen: Mitu (3) 12', 70', 74'

Attendance: 20,000
Referee: Paul Honiss (New Zealand)

== Ulster Home Attendance ==
Domestic League					European Cup					Total	
League	Fixtures	Average Attendance	Highest	Lowest	League	Fixtures	Average Attendance	Highest	Lowest	Total Attendance	Average Attendance
–	–	–	–	–	1995–96 Heineken Cup	1	2,500	2,500	2,500	2,500	2,500
–	–	–	–	–	1996–97 Heineken Cup	2	5,750	8,000	3,500	11,500	5,750
–	–	–	–	–	1997–98 Heineken Cup	3	2,617	3,250	2,100	7,850	2,617
–	–	–	–	–	1998–99 Heineken Cup	5	11,000	20,000	4,500	55,000	11,000
–	–	–	–	–	1999–00 Heineken Cup	3	8,667	12,000	6,000	26,000	8,667
–	–	–	–	–	2000–01 Heineken Cup	3	12,500	13,500	12,000	37,500	12,500
2001–02 Celtic League	4	8,500	12,000	6,000	2001–02 Heineken Cup	3	11,833	13,000	10,000	69,500	9,929
2002–03 Celtic League	4	8,375	10,500	6,000	2002–03 Heineken Cup	3	11,717	12,500	11,000	68,650	9,807
2003–04 Celtic League	12•	6,863	12,000	5,041	2003–04 Heineken Cup	3	11,489	12,300	10,243	116,819	7,788
2004–05 Celtic League	10	6,693	8,145	5,638	2004–05 Heineken Cup	3	9,452	11,435	7,320	95,283	7,330
2005–06 Celtic League	10	9,181	12,300	6,487	2005–06 Heineken Cup	3	12,284	12,300	12,252	128,665	9,897
2006–07 Celtic League	10	10,207	12,900	7,429	2006–07 Heineken Cup	3	12,599	12,772	12,278	139,862	10,759
2007–08 Celtic League	9	9,661	13,132	6,592	2007–08 Heineken Cup	3	10,335	13,000	8,340	117,956	9,830
2008–09 Celtic League	9	9,085	13,500	7,368	2008–09 Heineken Cup	3	9,329	10,397	8,729	109,752	9,146
2009–10 Celtic League	9	8,863	11,800	7,334	2009–10 Heineken Cup	3	10,509	11,000	8,262	109,947	9,162
2010–11 Celtic League	11	8,476	11,426	6,651	2010–11 Heineken Cup	3	8,863	10,566	7,777	119,829	8,559
2011–12 Pro12	11	8,258	11,379	6,296	2011–12 Heineken Cup	3	9,593	11,900	7,494	119,620	8,544
2012–13 Pro12	12	10,373	11,078	8,108	2012–13 Heineken Cup	3	11,123	11,451	10,940	157,840	10,523
2013–14 Pro12	11	13,348	16,950	10,693	2013–14 Heineken Cup	4	14,464	16,853	12,977	204,678	13,645
2014–15 Pro12	11	16,037	17,139	13,501	2014–15 European Rugby Champions Cup	3	16,179	16,931	15,659	224,946	16,068
2015–16 Pro12	11	15,310	17,332	12,640	2015–16 European Rugby Champions Cup	3	16,111	17,108	15,108	216,740	15,481
2016–17 Pro12	11	15,961	17,676	13,663	2016–17 European Rugby Champions Cup	3	16,028	16,843	14,924	223,658	15,976
2017–18 Pro14	12*	14,026	17,631	7,014	2017–18 European Rugby Champions Cup	3	15,314	15,646	15,004	214,247	14,283
2018–19 Pro14	11	13,835	17,358	11,882	2018–19 European Rugby Champions Cup	3	14,039	16,842	12,124	194,300	13,879
2019–20 Pro14	7‡	13,818	17,483	10,975	2019–20 European Rugby Champions Cup	3	17,024	17,923	15,466	147,796	14,780
2020–21 Pro14; Pro14 Rainbow Cup	0‡	–	–	–	2020–21 European Rugby Champions Cup	0‡	–	–	–	–	–
2021–22 United Rugby Championship	10	11,696	16,274	9,542	2021–22 European Rugby Champions Cup	3	14,969	18,196	12,000	161,869	12,452
2022–23 United Rugby Championship	10	13,413	16,741	10,858	2022–23 European Rugby Champions Cup	1	18,196	18,196	18,196	152,330	13,848
2023–24 United Rugby Championship	8†	13,679	18,196	10,181	2023–24 European Rugby Champions Cup	2	14,437	16,592	12,282	138,305	13,831
2024–25 United Rugby Championship	9	13,176	16,491	11,533	2024–25 European Rugby Champions Cup	2	12,335	13,093	11,576	143,251	13,023
2025–26 United Rugby Championship	9	12,606	18,196	9,563	2025–26 EPCR Challenge Cup	5	9,696	11,900	7,169	161,930	11,566
•Match figures inclusive of both Celtic League and Celtic Cup fixtures.
*Match figures inclusive of both Pro14 League fixtures and a European Champions Cup playoff fixture.
‡Match figures include fixtures in which COVID-19 restrictions limited attendance, but exclude fixtures in which no spectators were allowed due to the COVID-19 pandemic.
†Only matches in which there was a reported attendance are included.

Up to date as of the 2024–25 season.

Key
	Record high
	Record low
*	Affected by the COVID-19 pandemic

== Ravenhill Facilities Prior to Redevelopment ==
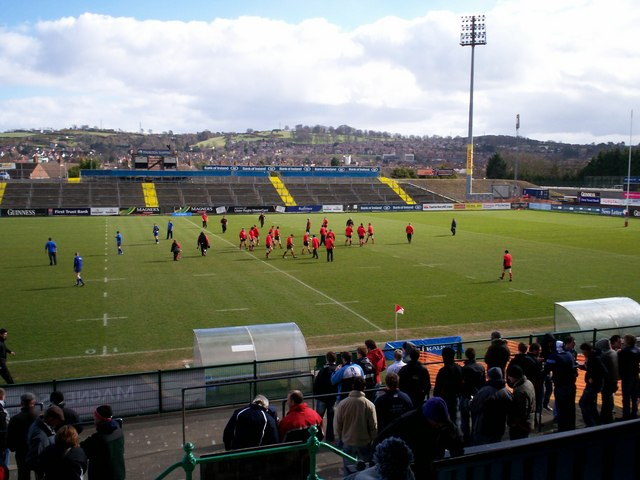
View from grandstand

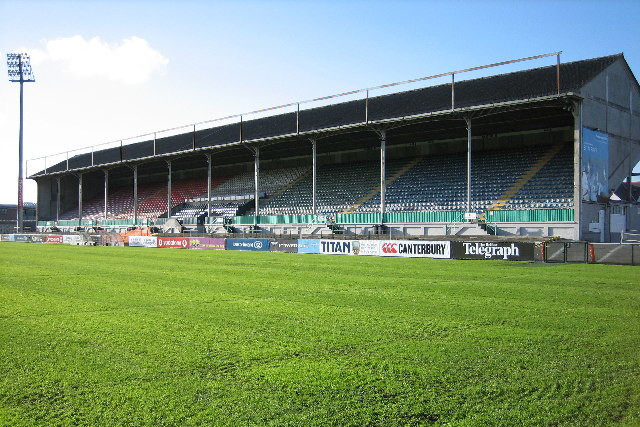
Grandstand

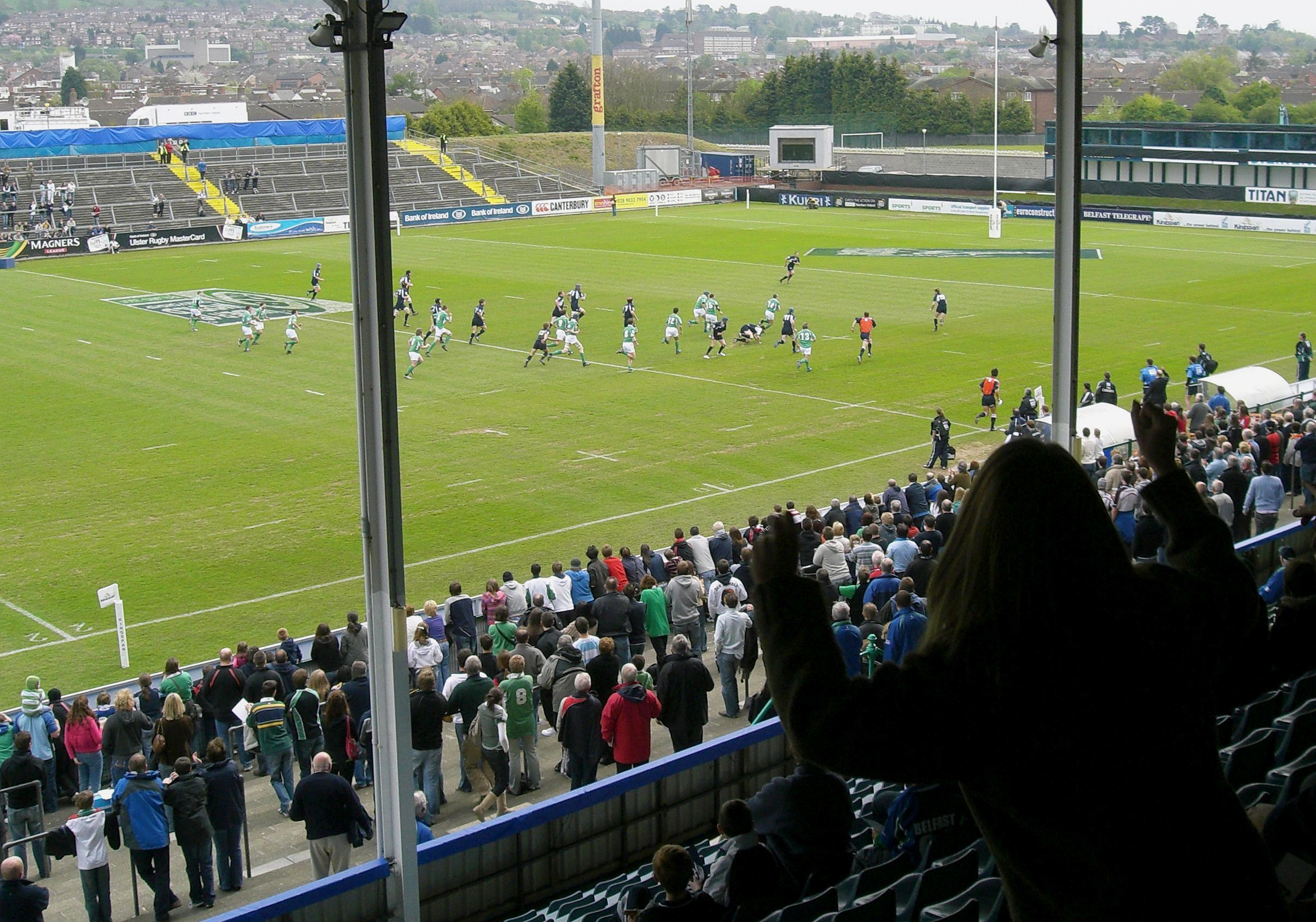
View from grandstand

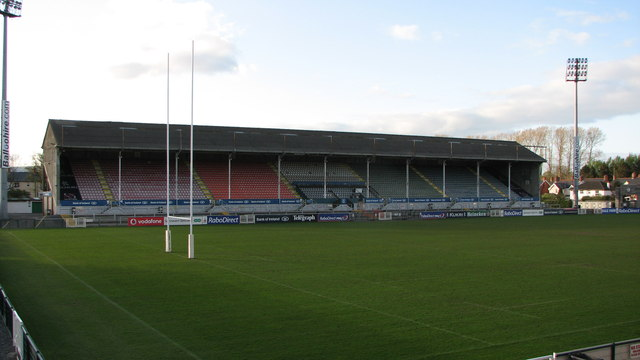
Old Ravenhill grandstand
