= Scotland at the Rugby World Cup =

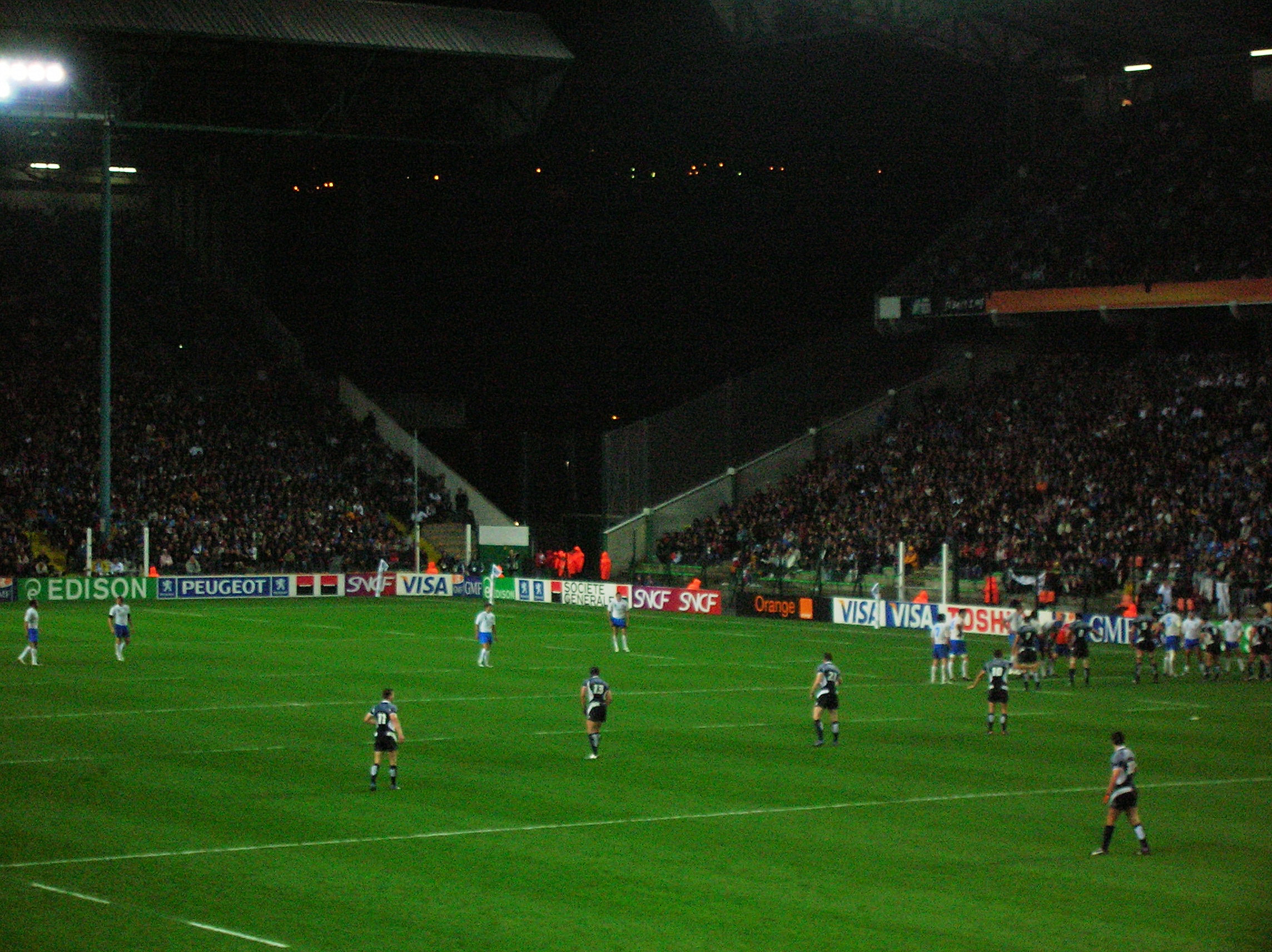
Scotland vs Italy at St Etienne, 2007 World Cup

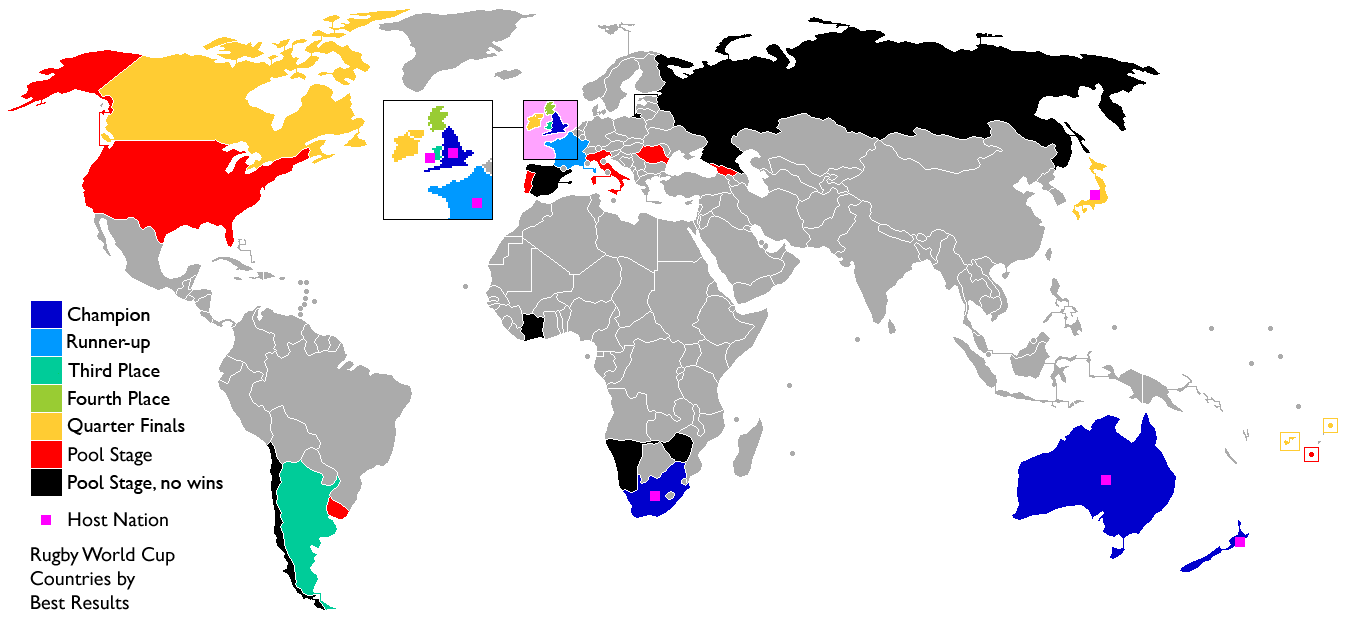
Map of nations best results, excluding nations which unsuccessfully participated in qualifying tournaments.

Scotland have played in every Rugby World Cup since the inaugural tournament in 1987.

Their best finish was fourth in 1991. In their semi-final on October 26, 1991, Scotland lost 6–9 to England at Murrayfield after Gavin Hastings missed a penalty almost in front of and a short distance from the posts. On October 30 Scotland lost the third-place play-off to New Zealand in Cardiff 13–6.

Since then they have qualified for the quarter-finals in every tournament except in 2011, 2019 and 2023, but have not qualified for the semi-finals.

In 2015 Scotland were defeated in the quarter-final match versus Australia following a number of refereeing decisions that provoked controversy.

In 2019, they were defeated in the pool stages by Ireland and hosts Japan, becoming the first Tier 1 team since Wales in 2007 to not qualify for the quarter-finals from a pool that only contained two Tier 1 teams.

== By position ==
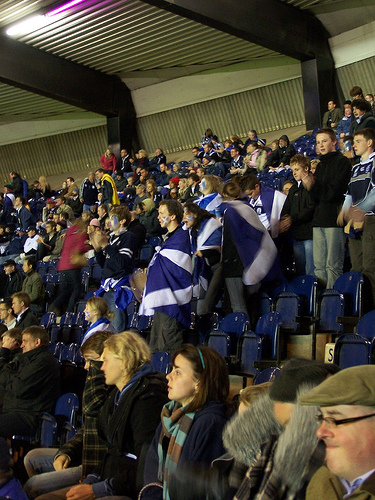
Scottish fans at the 2007 game against Romania

Rugby World Cup record									Qualification						
Year	Round	Pld	W	D	L	PF	PA	Squad	Pos	Pld	W	D	L	PF	PA
(New Zealand) (Australia) 1987	Quarter-finals	4	2	1	1	138	99	Squad	Invited						
(England) (France) (Ireland) (Scotland) (Wales) 1991	Fourth place	6	4	0	2	162	64	Squad	Automatically qualified						
(South Africa) 1995	Quarter-finals	4	2	0	2	179	75	Squad	Automatically qualified						
(Wales) 1999	Quarter-finals	5	3	0	2	173	108	Squad	1st	2	2	0	0	170	14
(Australia) 2003	Quarter-finals	5	3	0	2	118	130	Squad	Automatically qualified						
(France) 2007	Quarter-finals	5	3	0	2	129	85	Squad	Automatically qualified						
(New Zealand) 2011	Pool stage	4	2	0	2	73	59	Squad	Automatically qualified						
(England) 2015	Quarter-finals	5	3	0	2	170	128	Squad	Automatically qualified						
(Japan) 2019	Pool stage	4	2	0	2	119	55	Squad	Automatically qualified						
(France) 2023	Pool stage	4	2	0	2	146	71	Squad	Automatically qualified						
(Australia) 2027	Qualified								Automatically qualified						
(United States) 2031	To be determined								To be determined						
Total	—	46	26	1	19	1407	874	—	—	2	2	0	0	170	14
Champions; Runners–up; Third place; Fourth place; Home venue

== 1987 New Zealand & Australia ==
Group matches

Team	Pld	W	D	L	PF	PA	PD	T	Pts	Qualification
France	3	2	1	0	145	44	+101	25	5 (Note: France qualify as pool winner having scored three tries to Scotland's two in their drawn match.)	Knockout stage
Scotland	3	2	1	0	135	69	+66	22	5	Knockout stage
Romania	3	1	0	2	61	130	−69	6	2	
Zimbabwe	3	0	0	3	53	151	−98	5	0	

Notes:

23 May 1987

France	20–20	Scotland
Try: Sella; Berbizier; Blanco; Con: Blanco; Pen: Blanco (2)		Try: White; Duncan; Pen: Hastings (4)

Lancaster Park, Christchurch
Attendance: 18,000
Referee: Fred Howard (England)

30 May 1987

Scotland	60–21	Zimbabwe
Try: Tait (2); Tukalo (2); Duncan (2); Paxton (2); Oliver; Hastings; Jeffrey; Con: Hastings (8)		Try: Buitendag; Con: Grobler; Pen: Grobler (5)

Athletic Park, Wellington
Attendance: 12,000
Referee: David Burnett (Ireland)

2 June 1987

Romania	28–55	Scotland
Try: Murariu (2); Toader; Con: A. Dumitru; Ion; Pen: A. Dumitru (3); Ion		Try: Jeffrey (3); Tait (2); Hastings (2); Duncan; Tukalo; Con: Hastings (8); Pen: Hastings

Carisbrook, Dunedin
Attendance: 14,000
Referee: Stephen Hilditch (Ireland)

Quarter final

6 June 1987

New Zealand	30–3	Scotland
Try: Whetton; Gallagher; Con: Fox (2); Pen: Fox (6)		Pen: Hastings

Lancaster Park, Christchurch
Attendance: 30,000
Referee: David Burnett (Ireland)

== 1991 UK, Ireland & France ==
Group matches

5 October 1991

Scotland	47–9	Japan
Try: S. Hastings; Stanger; Chalmers; White; Penalty try Tukalo; G. Hastings; Con: G. Hastings (5); Pen: G. Hastings (2); Chalmers	Report	Try: Hosokawa; Con: Hosokawa; Drop: Hosokawa

Murrayfield Stadium, Edinburgh
Attendance: 40,000
Referee: Ed Morrison (England)

9 October 1991

Scotland	51–12	Zimbabwe
Try: Tukalo (3); Turnbull; S. Hastings; Stanger; Weir; White; Con: Dods (5); Pen: Dods (2); Drop: Wylie	Report	Try: Garvey (2); Con: Currin (2)

Murrayfield Stadium, Edinburgh
Attendance: 35,000
Referee: Don Reordan (United States)

12 October 1991

Scotland	24–15	Ireland
Try: Shiel; Armstrong; Con: G. Hastings (2); Pen: G. Hastings (3); Drop: Chalmers	Report	Pen: Keyes (4); Drop: Keyes

Murrayfield Stadium, Edinburgh
Attendance: 54,000
Referee: Fred Howard (England)

Team	Pld	W	D	L	PF	PA	PD	Pts
Scotland	3	3	0	0	122	36	+86	6
Ireland	3	2	0	1	102	51	+51	4
Japan	3	1	0	2	77	87	−10	2
Zimbabwe	3	0	0	3	31	158	−127	0

Quarter final

19 October 1991

Scotland	28–6	Western Samoa
Try: Jeffrey (2); Stanger; Con: Hastings (2); Pen: Hastings (4)	Report	Pen: Vaea; Drop: Bachop

Murrayfield Stadium, Edinburgh
Attendance: 54,000
Referee: Derek Bevan (Wales)

Semi-final

26 October 1991

Scotland	6–9	England
Pen: G. Hastings (2)	Report	Pen: Webb (2); Drop: Andrew

Murrayfield Stadium, Edinburgh
Attendance: 54,000
Referee: Kerry Fitzgerald (Australia)

Third-place play-off

30 October 1991

New Zealand	13–6	Scotland
Try: Little; Pen: Preston (3)	Report	Pen: G. Hastings (2)

Cardiff Arms Park, Cardiff
Attendance: 47,000
Referee: Stephen Hilditch (Ireland)

== 1995 South Africa ==
Group matches

26 May 1995

Ivory Coast	0–89	Scotland
		Try: G. Hastings (4); Logan (2); Walton (2); Wright; Chalmers; Stanger; Burnell; Shiel; Con: G. Hastings (9); Pen: G. Hastings (2)

Olympia Park, Rustenburg
Attendance: 20,000
Referee: Felise Vito (Western Samoa)

29 May 1995

Scotland	41–5	Tonga
Try: S. Hastings; Peters; G. Hastings; Con: G. Hastings; Pen: G. Hastings (8)		Try: Fenukitau

Loftus Versfeld, Pretoria
Attendance: 21,000
Referee: Barry Leask (Australia)

3 June 1995

France	22–19	Scotland
Try: Ntamack; Con: Lacroix; Pen: Lacroix (5)		Try: Wainwright; Con: G. Hastings; Pen: G. Hastings (4)

Loftus Versfeld, Pretoria
Attendance: 39,000
Referee: Wayne Erickson (Australia)

Team	Pld	W	D	L	PF	PA	PD	Pts
France	3	3	0	0	114	47	+67	9
Scotland	3	2	0	1	149	27	+122	7
Tonga	3	1	0	2	44	90	−46	5
Ivory Coast	3	0	0	3	29	172	−143	3

Quarter final

11 June 1995

New Zealand	48–30	Scotland
Try: Little (2); Lomu; Mehrtens; Bunce; Fitzpatrick; Con: Mehrtens (6); Pen: Mehrtens (2)		Try: Weir (2); S. Hastings; Con: G. Hastings (3); Pen: G. Hastings (3)

Loftus Versfeld, Pretoria
Attendance: 28,000
Referee: Derek Bevan (Wales)

== 1999 Wales ==
Group matches

3 October 1999
17:00 WEST/GMT+01 (UTC+01)

Scotland	29–46	South Africa
Try: M. Leslie; Tait; Con: Logan (2); Pen: Logan (4); Drop: Townsend		Try: Le Roux; Kayser; Van der Westhuizen; Fleck; A. Venter; B. Venter; Con: De Beer (5); Pen: De Beer (2)

Murrayfield, Edinburgh
Attendance: 57,612
Referee: Colin Hawke (New Zealand)

8 October 1999
16:00 WEST/GMT+01 (UTC+01)

Scotland	43–12	Uruguay
Try: Russell; Armstrong; Metcalfe; M. Leslie; Simpson; Townsend; Con: Logan (5); Pen: Logan		Pen: Aguirre (3); Sciarra

Murrayfield, Edinburgh
Attendance: 9,463
Referee: Stuart Dickinson (Australia)

16 October 1999
15:00 WEST/GMT+01 (UTC+01)

Scotland	48–0	Spain
Try: Mather (2); McLaren; Longstaff; Hodge; C. Murray; Penalty try Con: Hodge (5); Pen: Hodge

Murrayfield, Edinburgh
Attendance: 17,593
Referee: Clayton Thomas (Wales)

Team	Pld	W	D	L	PF	PA	PD	Pts
South Africa	3	3	0	0	132	35	+97	9
Scotland	3	2	0	1	120	58	+62	7
Uruguay	3	1	0	2	42	97	−55	5
Spain	3	0	0	3	18	122	−104	3

Quarter-final play-offs

20 October 1999
15:30 WEST/GMT+1 (UTC+01)

Scotland	35–20	Samoa
Try: C. Murray; M. Leslie; Penalty try Con: Logan; Pen: Logan (5); Drop: Townsend	Report	Try: Lima; Sititi; Con: Leaega (2); Pen: Leaega (2)

Murrayfield, Edinburgh
Attendance: 20,000
Referee: David McHugh (Ireland)

Quarter final

24 October 1999
18:00 WEST/GMT+1 (UTC+01)

Scotland	18–30	New Zealand
Try: C. Murray; Pountney; Con: Logan; Pen: Logan; Drop: Townsend	Report	Try: Umaga (2); Wilson; Lomu; Con: Mehrtens (2); Pen: Mehrtens (2)

Murrayfield, Edinburgh
Attendance: 59,750
Referee: Ed Morrison (England)

== 2003 Australia ==
Group matches

12 October 2003

Scotland	32–11	Japan
Try: Paterson (2); Grimes; Taylor; Danielli; Con: Paterson; Townsend; Pen: Paterson		Try: Onozawa; Pen: Hirose (2)

Dairy Farmers Stadium, Townsville
Attendance: 19,170
Referee: Stuart Dickinson (Australia)

20 October 2003

Scotland	39–15	United States
Try: Danielli (2); Kerr; Townsend; Paterson; Con: Paterson (4); Pen: Paterson (2)		Pen: Hercus (5)

Suncorp Stadium, Brisbane
Attendance: 46,796
Referee: Jonathan Kaplan (South Africa)

25 October 2003

France	51–9	Scotland
Try: Betsen; Harinordoquy; Michalak; Galthié; Brusque; Con: Michalak (3); Merceron; Pen: Michalak (4); Drop: Michalak; Brusque		Pen: Paterson (3)

Stadium Australia, Sydney
Attendance: 78,974
Referee: David McHugh (Ireland)

1 November 2003

Scotland	22–20	Fiji
Try: Smith; Con: Paterson; Pen: Paterson (5)		Try: Caucaunibuca (2); Con: Little (2); Pen: Little (2)

Aussie Stadium, Sydney
Attendance: 37,137
Referee: Tony Spreadbury (England)

Team	Pld	W	D	L	PF	PA	PD	BP	Pts	Qualification
France	4	4	0	0	204	70	+134	4	20	Quarter-finals
Scotland	4	3	0	1	102	97	+5	2	14	Quarter-finals
Fiji	4	2	0	2	98	114	−16	2	10	
United States	4	1	0	3	86	125	−39	2	6	
Japan	4	0	0	4	79	163	−84	0	0	

Quarter final

8 November 2003

Australia	33–16	Scotland
Try: Mortlock 46' c Gregan 59' c Lyons 64' c Con: Flatley (3); Pen: Flatley (4)		Try: Russell 80' c Con: Paterson; Pen: Paterson (2); Drop: Paterson 38'

Suncorp Stadium, Brisbane
Attendance: 45,412
Referee: Steve Walsh (New Zealand)

== 2007 France ==
Group matches

Pos	Team	Pld	W	D	L	PF	PA	PD	B	Pts	Qualification
1	New Zealand	4	4	0	0	309	35	+274	4	20	Qualified for the quarter-finals
2	Scotland	4	3	0	1	116	66	+50	2	14	Qualified for the quarter-finals
3	Italy	4	2	0	2	85	117	−32	1	9	Eliminated, automatic qualification for RWC 2011
4	Romania	4	1	0	3	40	161	−121	1	5	
5	Portugal	4	0	0	4	38	209	−171	1	1	

9 September 2007
18:00

Scotland	56–10	Portugal
Tries: R. Lamont (2) 12' c, 14' c S. Lawson 23' c Dewey 30' c Parks 57' c Southwell 60' c Brown 68' c Ford 76' c Con: Parks (5/5); Paterson (3/3)	Report	Try: Carvalho 28' c Con: D. Pinto (1/1); Pen: D. Pinto (1/1) 34'

Stade Geoffroy-Guichard, Saint-Étienne
Attendance: 34,162
Referee: Steve Walsh (New Zealand)

18 September 2007
21:00

Scotland	42–0	Romania
Tries: Paterson 2' c Hogg (3) 17' c, 46' c, 53' c R. Lamont (2) 36' c, 72' c Con: Paterson (6/6)	Report

Murrayfield Stadium, Edinburgh
Attendance: 31,222
Referee: Nigel Owens (Wales)

23 September 2007
17:00

Scotland	0–40	New Zealand
	Report	Tries: McCaw 5' c Howlett (2) 15' m, 74' m Kelleher 33' m Williams 62' m Carter 65' c Con: Carter (2/6); Pen: Carter (2/3) 26', 43'

Murrayfield Stadium, Edinburgh
Attendance: 64,558
Referee: Marius Jonker (South Africa)

29 September 2007
21:00

Scotland	18–16	Italy
Pen: Paterson (6/6) 2', 6', 32', 35', 47', 53'	Report	Try: Troncon 13' c Con: Bortolussi (1/1); Pen: Bortolussi (3/6) 18', 56', 62'

Stade Geoffroy-Guichard, Saint-Étienne
Attendance: 34,701
Referee: Jonathan Kaplan (South Africa)

Quarter final

7 October 2007
21:00

Argentina	19–13	Scotland
Try: Longo Elía 33' c Con: F. Contepomi (1/1); Pen: F. Contepomi (3/4) 23', 29', 43'; Drop: Hernández (1/4) 54'	Report	Try: Cusiter 63' c Con: Paterson (1/1); Pen: Parks (1/2) 16'; Paterson (1/1) 38'

Stade de France, Saint-Denis
Attendance: 76,866
Referee: Joël Jutge (France)

== 2011 New Zealand ==
Group matches

10 September 2011
13:00

Scotland	34–24	Romania
Try: Blair 8' m Ansbro 21' c Danielli (2) 75' m, 78' m Con: Paterson (1/4); Pen: Paterson (4/5) 3', 38', 53', 71'	Report	Try: Lazăr 40+' m Carpo 67' c Con: Dimofte (1/2); Pen: Dumbravă (2/4) 12', 23'; Dimofte (2/2) 54', 62'

Rugby Park Stadium, Invercargill
Attendance: 12,592
Referee: Dave Pearson (England)

14 September 2011
19:30

Scotland	15–6	Georgia
Pen: Parks (4/7) 24', 34', 71', 76'; Drop: Parks (1/1) 39'	Report	Pen: Kvirikashvili (2/2) 17', 73'

Rugby Park Stadium, Invercargill
Attendance: 10,267
Referee: George Clancy (Ireland)

25 September 2011
20:30

Argentina	13–12	Scotland
Try: González Amorosino 73' c Con: Contepomi (1/1); Pen: Contepomi (2/5) 19', 64'	Report	Pen: Paterson (1/2) 35'; Jackson (1/1) 38'; Drop: Jackson (1/1) 65'; Parks (1/2) 72'

Wellington Regional Stadium, Wellington
Attendance: 26,937
Referee: Wayne Barnes (England)

1 October 2011
20:30

England	16–12	Scotland
Try: Ashton 78' c Con: Flood (1/1); Pen: Wilkinson (2/5) 34', 63'; Drop: Wilkinson (1/2) 57'	Report	Pen: Paterson (2/2) 9', 55'; Parks (1/1) 17'; Drop: Parks (1/3) 40+'

Eden Park, Auckland
Attendance: 58,213
Referee: Craig Joubert (South Africa)

Pos	Team	Pld	W	D	L	PF	PA	PD	T	B	Pts	Qualification
1	England	4	4	0	0	137	34	+103	18	2	18	Advanced to the quarter-finals and qualified for the 2015 Rugby World Cup
2	Argentina	4	3	0	1	90	40	+50	10	2	14	Advanced to the quarter-finals and qualified for the 2015 Rugby World Cup
3	Scotland	4	2	0	2	73	59	+14	4	3	11	Eliminated but qualified for 2015 Rugby World Cup
4	Georgia	4	1	0	3	48	90	−42	3	0	4	
5	Romania	4	0	0	4	44	169	−125	3	0	0	

== 2015 England ==
Group matches

23 September 2015
14:30

Scotland	45–10	Japan
Try: Hardie 48' m Bennett (2) 56' c, 69 c Seymour 64' c Russell 74' c Con: Laidlaw (4/5) 57', 65', 70', 75'; Pen: Laidlaw (4/5) 3', 12', 18', 20'	Report	Try: Mafi 15' c Con: Goromaru (1/1) 16'; Pen: Goromaru (1/3) 46'

Kingsholm, Gloucester
Attendance: 14,354
Referee: John Lacey (Ireland)

27 September 2015
14:30

Scotland	39–16	United States
Try: Visser 42' m Maitland 47' c Nel 54' c Scott 65' c Weir 79' c Con: Russell (1/2) 48'; Laidlaw (3/3) 55', 66', 80'; Pen: Hogg (1/2) 7'; Russell (1/2) 16'	Report	Try: Lamositele 21' c Con: MacGinty (1/1) 22'; Pen: MacGinty (3/3) 3', 40', 51'

Elland Road, Leeds
Attendance: 33,521
Referee: Chris Pollock (New Zealand)

3 October 2015
16:45

South Africa	34–16	Scotland
Try: Burger 13' c Pietersen 38' c Habana 73' m Con: Pollard (2/3) 13', 40'; Pen: Pollard (4/4) 17', 27', 62', 68'; Drop: Pollard 51'	Report	Try: Seymour 49' c Con: Laidlaw (1/1) 50'; Pen: Laidlaw (2/3) 30', 45'; Weir (1/1) 60'

St. James' Park, Newcastle
Attendance: 50,900
Referee: Nigel Owens (Wales)

10 October 2015
14:30

Samoa	33–36	Scotland
Try: T. Pisi 11' c Leiataua 14' m Lee-Lo 21' m Matu'u 78' c Con: T. Pisi (1/3) 11'; Fa'apale (1/1) 78'; Pen: T. Pisi (3/3) 5', 29', 38'	Report	Try: Seymour 12' c Hardie 32' c Laidlaw 74' c Con: Laidlaw (3/3) 13', 33', 75'; Pen: Laidlaw (5/7) 9', 20', 25', 51', 53'

St. James' Park, Newcastle
Attendance: 51,982
Referee: Jaco Peyper (South Africa)

Pos	Team	Pld	W	D	L	PF	PA	PD	T	B	Pts	Qualification
1	South Africa	4	3	0	1	176	56	+120	23	4	16	Advanced to the quarter-finals and qualified for the 2019 Rugby World Cup
2	Scotland	4	3	0	1	136	93	+43	14	2	14	Advanced to the quarter-finals and qualified for the 2019 Rugby World Cup
3	Japan	4	3	0	1	98	100	−2	9	0	12	Eliminated but qualified for 2019 Rugby World Cup
4	Samoa	4	1	0	3	69	124	−55	7	2	6	
5	United States	4	0	0	4	50	156	−106	5	0	0	

Quarter final

18 October 2015
16:00 BST (UTC+01)

Australia	35–34	Scotland
Try: Ashley-Cooper 9' m Mitchell (2) 30' m, 43' c Hooper 40' m Kuridrani 64' c Con: Foley (2/5) 44', 65'; Pen: Foley (2/2) 54', 80'	Report	Try: Horne 18' c Seymour 59' m Bennett 74' c Con: Laidlaw (2/3) 19', 75'; Pen: Laidlaw (5/5) 14', 21', 34', 47', 69'

Twickenham Stadium, London
Attendance: 77,110
Referee: Craig Joubert (South Africa)

== 2019 Japan ==
Pos	Team	Pld	W	D	L	PF	PA	PD	T	B	Pts	Qualification
1	Japan	4	4	0	0	115	62	+53	13	3	19	Advanced to the quarter-finals and qualified for the 2023 Rugby World Cup
2	Ireland	4	3	0	1	121	27	+94	18	4	16	Advanced to the quarter-finals and qualified for the 2023 Rugby World Cup
3	Scotland	4	2	0	2	119	55	+64	16	3	11	Eliminated but qualified for 2023 Rugby World Cup
4	Samoa	4	1	0	3	58	128	−70	8	1	5	
5	Russia	4	0	0	4	19	160	−141	1	0	0	

Group matches

22 September 2019
16:45 JST (UTC+09)

(1 BP) Ireland	27–3	Scotland
Try: Ja. Ryan 6' c Best 14' m Furlong 25' c Conway 56' m Con: Sexton (1/2) 8'; Murray (1/2) 27'; Pen: Carty (1/1) 68'	Report	Pen: Laidlaw (1/1) 21'

International Stadium Yokohama, Yokohama
Attendance: 63,731
Referee: Wayne Barnes (England)

30 September 2019
19:15 JST (UTC+09)

(1 BP) Scotland	34–0	Samoa
Try: Maitland 29' c Laidlaw 33' c Penalty try (2) 56', 74'; Con: Laidlaw (2/2) 30', 35'; Pen: Laidlaw (1/1) 8'; Drop: Hogg (1/1) 37'	Report

Kobe Misaki Stadium, Kobe
Attendance: 27,586
Referee: Pascal Gaüzère (France)

9 October 2019
16:15 JST (UTC+09)

(1 BP) Scotland	61–0	Russia
Try: Hastings (2) 14' c, 18' c G. Horne (3) 22' c, 45' c, 59' m Turner 51' c Seymour 56' c Barclay 75' c McInally 78' c Con: Hastings (8/9) 15', 20', 24', 46', 53', 57', 76', 80'	Report

Shizuoka Stadium Ecopa, Fukuroi
Attendance: 44,123
Referee: Wayne Barnes (England)

13 October 2019
19:45 JST (UTC+09)

(1 BP) Japan	28–21	Scotland (1 BP)
Try: Matsushima 18' c Inagaki 26' c Fukuoka (2) 40' c, 43' c Con: Tamura (4/4) 20', 27', 40+2', 44'	Report	Try: Russell 7' c Nel 50' c Fagerson 55' c Con: Laidlaw (2/2) 8', 51'; Russell (1/1) 56'

International Stadium Yokohama, Yokohama
Attendance: 67,666
Referee: Ben O'Keeffe (New Zealand)

== 2023 France ==
Pos	Team	Pld	W	D	L	PF	PA	PD	TF	TA	B	Pts	Qualification
1	Ireland	4	4	0	0	190	46	+144	27	5	3	19	Advance to knockout stage, and qualification to the 2027 Men's Rugby World Cup
2	South Africa	4	3	0	1	151	34	+117	22	4	3	15	Advance to knockout stage, and qualification to the 2027 Men's Rugby World Cup
3	Scotland	4	2	0	2	146	71	+75	21	10	2	10	Qualification to the 2027 Men's Rugby World Cup
4	Tonga	4	1	0	3	96	177	−81	13	25	1	5	
5	Romania	4	0	0	4	32	287	−255	4	43	0	0	

Source: World Rugby
Rules for classification: Pool stage tiebreakers

10 September 2023
17:45 CEST (UTC+2)

South Africa	18–3	Scotland
Try: Du Toit 47' m Arendse 50' c Con: De Klerk (1/1) 51'; Pen: Libbok (2/4) 13', 25'	Report	Pen: Russell (1/1) 40+1'

Stade de Marseille, Marseille
Attendance: 63,586
Referee: Angus Gardner (Australia)

24 September 2023
17:45 CEST (UTC+2)

(1 BP) Scotland	45–17	Tonga
Try: Turner 5' c Van der Merwe 27' m Steyn 30' m Darge 40+2' c Horne 54' c Kinghorn 68' c Graham 80+2' c Con: Russell (5/7) 6', 40+3', 55', 70', 80+3'	Report	Try: Kata 20' c Tameifuna 44' c Con: Havili (2/2) 21', 45'; Pen: Havili (1/1) 10'

Stade de Nice, Nice
Attendance: 33,189
Referee: Karl Dickson (England)

30 September 2023
21:00 CEST (UTC+2)

(1 BP) Scotland	84–0	Romania
Try: Watson 9' c Price 17' c Graham (4) 21' c, 34' c, 40' c, 77' c Fagerson 38' c Harris 45' c Smith 53' c Healy 58' c Matthews 71' c Darge 73' c Con: Healy (11/11) 10', 18', 22', 35', 39', 40', 47', 55', 59', 72', 77'; Horne (1/1) 73'	Report

Stade Pierre-Mauroy, Villeneuve-d'Ascq
Attendance: 46,516
Referee: Wayne Barnes (England)

7 October 2023
21:00 CEST (UTC+2)

(1 BP) Ireland	36–14	Scotland
Try: Lowe 2' m Keenan (2) 26' c, 39' c Henderson 32' c Sheehan 44' m Ringrose 58' m Con: Sexton (3/5) 27', 33', 40'	Report	Try: Ashman 64' c Price 66' c Con: Russell (2/2) 65', 66'

Stade de France, Saint-Denis
Attendance: 78,459
Referee: Nic Berry (Australia)

== Individual Records ==
Gavin Hastings is by far the most successful Scottish world cup player, and has gained a number of records.

=== Points ===
Most overall points in final stages
Points	Name	Country	App.	Tries	Con.	Pen.	Drop.	Tournament
227	Gavin Hastings (second position)	Scotland	13	9	39	36	–	1987, 1991, 1995

Key: App = Appearances. Con = conversions. Pen = penalties. Drop = drop goals.

=== Conversions ===
Most overall conversions in final stages

- Gavin Hastings 39 (1987–1995)

=== Penalty goals ===
Most penalties in a match

- Gavin Hastings 8 (v Tonga, 1995)

== Overall record ==
Against	Played	Win	Draw	Lost	Win %
Argentina	2	0	0	2	0%
Australia	2	0	0	2	0%
England	2	0	0	2	0%
Fiji	1	1	0	0	100%
France	3	0	1	2	0%
Georgia	1	1	0	0	100%
Ireland	3	1	0	2	33%
Italy	1	1	0	0	100%
Ivory Coast	1	1	0	0	100%
Japan	4	3	0	1	75%
New Zealand	5	0	0	5	0%
Portugal	1	1	0	0	100%
Romania	4	4	0	0	100%
Russia	1	1	0	0	100%
Samoa	4	4	0	0	100%
South Africa	3	0	0	3	0%
Spain	1	1	0	0	100%
Tonga	2	2	0	0	100%
United States	2	2	0	0	100%
Uruguay	1	1	0	0	100%
Zimbabwe	2	2	0	0	100%
Overall	46	26	1	19	57%

RWC qualifying countries which Scotland has not played at the tournament include Canada, Wales and Namibia.

== Miscellaneous ==
=== Draws ===
- France 20–20 Scotland (1987)

=== Nil points ===
- Scotland 89–0 Ivory Coast (1995)
- Scotland 48–0 Spain (1999)
- Scotland 42–0 Romania (2007)
- Scotland 0–40 New Zealand (2007)
- Scotland 34–0 Samoa (2019)
- Scotland 61–0 Russia (2019)
- Scotland 84–0 Romania (2023)

== Hosting ==
Scotland has never been the main host of the World Cup, but a number of Rugby World Cup games have been played in Scotland over the years.

=== 1991 World Cup: Britain/Ireland/France ===
The 1991 Rugby World Cup final was played in England, pool and finals games were played all over the main five European nations. Pool B games, which involved European nations, Scotland and Ireland, had all their games in either Dublin or Edinburgh with one game being played in Ulster.

=== 1999 World Cup: Wales ===
The 1999 World Cup was hosted by Wales with some games spread across Scotland, England, Ireland and France. All Pool A games were held in Scotland. Second round play-offs and the quarter-finals were held at a variety of European venues.

=== 2007 World Cup: France ===
The 2007 competition was held in France, with some games played in Wales and Scotland. Two Pool C matches were held at Edinburgh's Murrayfield.

== See also ==
- History of the Rugby World Cup
- National team appearances in the Rugby World Cup
