= Turuva =

Turuva is a surname. Notable people with the surname include:

- Opeti Turuva (born 1967), Fijian rugby player
- Sunia Turuva (born 2002), Fijian rugby player
