= Mark Williams (rugby union) =

US international rugby union player

- Born: June 26, 1961 (age 65)
- Height: 5 ft 11 in (1.80 m)
- Weight: 190 lb (86 kg; 13 st 8 lb)

Rugby union career
- Position: Centre
Senior career
| Years | Team | Apps | (Points) |
- Boston RFC
| – | Gentlemen of Aspen | | |
International career
| Years | Team | Apps | (Points) |
| 1987–1999 | United States | 37 | (143) |
Coaching career
- Years: Team
- 1996–97: USA 7s

Mark Andrew Williams (born June 26, 1961) is an American former rugby union player who played center. Williams played for the U.S. national rugby team from 1987 to 1999, earning 37 caps. Williams scored 143 points over his test career, and he retired as the #3 all-time U.S. points scorer. Williams was on the U.S. squad for the 1991 and 1999 Rugby World Cups, and was the leading scorer for the U.S. at the 1991 Rugby World Cup with 16 points.

In 1996, towards the end of his playing career, Williams was selected as head coach of the United States national rugby sevens team. He coached the U.S. sevens team to a 17th place finish at the 1997 Rugby World Cup Sevens.
