= Chris Tynan =

Canada international rugby union player

- Born: Christopher James Calhoun Tynan; July 11, 1966 (age 60) Vancouver, British Columbia, Canada
- Height: 5 ft 9 in (175 cm)
- Weight: 175 lb (79 kg)
- University: University of British Columbia

Rugby union career
- Position: Scrum-half
Senior career
Years	Team	Apps	(Points)
1987–1998	Meraloma Rugby		
1993	Cambridge University		
International career
Years	Team	Apps	(Points)
1987–1998	Canada	20	(18)

Christopher James Calhoun Tynan (born July 11, 1966) is a Canadian former rugby union player who played as scrum-half.

== Career ==
Tynan played rugby union for Meraloma at club level. He debuted for Canada on 14 November 1987, against United States, in Victoria. He was also called up in the Canada 1991 Rugby World Cup squad, where he played three matches in the tournament. Tynan also played in The Varsity Match for Cambridge, which he won in 1993. Although not being anymore called up in the Canada squad in the 1995 Rugby World Cup, Tynan still played for Canada until his last test cap on 6 June 1998, against United States, in Burlington.
