= 2000 Japan rugby union tour of Europe =

Summary
P	W	D	L
Total
3	2	0	1
Test match
1	0	0	1
Opponent
P	W	D	L
Ireland
1	0	0	1

The 2000 Japan rugby union tour of Europe was a series of matches played in November 2000 in France and Ireland by Japan national rugby union team.

== Results ==
'Scores and results list Japan's points tally first.

Opposing Team	For	Against	Date	Venue	Status
France A	40	23	November 4, 2000	Lille	Tour match
Ireland Under 23	13	83	November 7, 2000	RavenhillBelfast	Tour match
Ireland	9	78	November 11, 2000	Lansdowne Road, Dublin	Test Match
