= Masami Horikoshi =

Japanese rugby union player (born 1968)

- Born: November 27, 1968 (age 57) Kumagaya Saitama Prefecture, Japan
- Height: 5 ft 3 in (1.60 m)
- Weight: 150 lb (68 kg)
- School: Kumagaya High School
- University: Waseda University

Rugby union career
- Position: Scrum-half
Amateur team(s)
Years	Team	Apps	(Points)
1984-1986	Kumagaya High School		
1987-1990	Waseda University RFC		
Senior career
Years	Team	Apps	(Points)
1991-1998	Kobe Steel		
International career
Years	Team	Apps	(Points)
1988-1998	Japan	26	(21)
Coaching career
- Years: Team
- 1999-: Rissho University RFC

Masami Horikoshi (堀越正巳, Horikoshi Masami), (born 27 November 1968 in Kumagaya) is a former Japanese rugby union player and coach. He played as scrum-half. Currently he is the coach of Rissho University RFC.

== Biography ==
Until his high school years, Horikoshi was aiming to play baseball become a professional baseball player, but then he abandoned it because of his shortness. He graduated from Kumagaya Industrial High School which was a prefectural rugby high school with the advice of seniors. When he played as scrum-half since one year, he was in the best four for a national high school rugby competition. In the second year, Horikoshi was selected for the Saitama prefectural selection and won his first title at the National Sports Festival, among the best four at the National High School Competition. In three years, he was called up in the Japan national high school team and participated in a New Zealand tour, placing second in the National High School competition. In 1987, Horikoshi entered Waseda University and started to play for its Rugby Football Club. He played regularly as a member during a match against an Irish students' representative team on 20 September of the same year, won two high school championships in 1987 and 1989 and won the Japanese championship in 1987. During the high school days, he was called by his nickname Mole (モグ, Mogu), due to his agile and elusive movements, similar to a ninja, his brilliant passes and his skillfulness to pass through the opponent defence. It was called the return of Hiroaki Shukuzawa, his fellow senior. Horikoshi also served as captain at the end of the fourth year and played a good match against Meiji University RFC, led by Yoshihito Yoshida. In 1991, after graduating from Waseda University, Horikoshi joined Kobe Steel and played for its team. Although he was thinking about getting employed to a life insurance company that promised him to go abroad in the United Kingdom, he chose to work for Kobe Steel, from the fact that a number of Japanese internationals worked there, including Seiji Hirao. For Kobe Steel, Horikoshi contributed to Kobe Steel's seventh consecutive victory in the Japanese championship after the fourth consecutive title, where Horikoshi was the captain. After that, his last match for Kobe Steel was on 28 February 1999, against Toshiba Fuchu. He was called up first for the Japan national team in 1988, during his university second year, earning a total of 26 caps. His first cap was against Oxford University, in Tokyo, on 1 October 1988. After fighting for the scrum-half place with Toshiba Fuchu player Wataru Murata, Horikoshi took part at the 1991 and at the 1995 Rugby World Cups. After that, even after leaving Kobe Steel, Horikoshi continued to play concurrently as supervisor at Rissho University while he was called up by the Japan national team, coached by Hirao. While aiming to take part at the 1999 Rugby World Cup, former All Black Graeme Bachop was recently capped, announced on August of the same year, thus leaving out Horikoshi from the roster. In 2000, Horikoshi retired as player taking part in a testimonial match between Waseda and Meiji universities, where he played along with all the Waseda players.

== After retirement ==
After his retirement in 1998, Horikoshi was appointed as coach of Rissho University RFC. In 2004, Rissho won against Takushoku University RFC and led Rissho to promotion in the first division of the Kanto University Rugby League, however, Rissho was relegated to the second division in 2007. In 2012, under Horikoshi's guidance, Rissho won against Kanto Gakuin University RFC, achieving again the promotion to the first division, but it was relegated to the second division in 2014.

In 2014, following the establishment of the rugby sevens club Arukas Kumagaya, Horikoshi took office as coach and general manager of the team. The team was born as a trigger from Horikoshi and others, aiming to strengthen and train female rugby players, train coaches, spread to the region and win medals in the Olympic Games.

In 2015, Horikoshi was appointed as Saitama Rugby Ambassador, responsible for the Kumagaya public relations in the 2019 Rugby World Cup.

== Sources ==
- "Katsu tame no Team Make", Kodansha, 2000. ISBN 978-4062104845.
