= Opeti Turuva =

Fijian rugby union player (born 1967)

- Born: 8 July 1967 (age 59) Yavusania, Nadi, Fiji
- Height: 5 ft 9 in (1.75 m)
- Weight: 187 lb (85 kg)
- Notable relative: Venisemani Ratubalavu (nephew)

Rugby union career
- Position: Fullback
Senior career
Years	Team	Apps	(Points)
198?-1990	Nawaka		
1990-1994	Nadi		
1994-1999	Kio Kio United		
Provincial / State sides
Years	Team	Apps	(Points)
1994	King Country		
International career
Years	Team	Apps	(Points)
1990-1999	Fiji	11	(58)

Opeti Turuva (born Nadi, 8 June 1967) is a Fijian former rugby union player. He played as Fullback.

== Career ==
His first international cap for Fiji was during a test match against Hong Kong, at Hong Kong, on 5 December 1990. Turuva was also called up for the 1991 Rugby World Cup roster, where he played only against Romania, where he scored the third drop goal in the match. His last cap for Fiji was against USA, in San Francisco, on 22 May 1999. He played for Nadi until 1994, when he played the National Provincial Championship in New Zealand for King Country.

He Played Club Rugby in Sri Lanka across two of the leading clubs Kandy Sports Club and CR & FC
