= Severo Koroduadua =

- Born: Severo Koroduadua Waqanibau; December 22, 1960 (age 65) Kadavu, Fiji
- Height: 6 ft 1 in (1.85 m)
- Weight: 198 lb (90 kg)
- School: St.John's College Cawaci, Ovalau
- Occupation: Policeman

Rugby union career
- Position(s): Fullback, Fly-half
Amateur team(s)
Years	Team	Apps	(Points)
- St.John's College Cawaci
Senior career
Years	Team	Apps	(Points)
1982-1984	Suva		
1984-1994	Fiji Police Rugby Union		
International career
Years	Team	Apps	(Points)
1982-1991	Fiji	27	(268)

Severo Koroduadua Waqanibau (Fijian pronunciation: [seβero koroⁿduaⁿdua ɰaŋ.ɡaniᵐbɔu]) (born 22 December 1960 in Kadavu) is a Fijian former rugby union footballer, he played as a fullback. His nickname is Superboot, because of his goal kicking prowess.

== Playing career ==
He studied at St. John's College in Cawaci, on the island of Ovalau. He has played for the Suva province team and for the Fiji Police Rugby Club. His first international match was against the Scotland XV at Murrayfield, on September 25, 1982. He was part of the 1987 Rugby World Cup, where he played 4 matches and of the 1991 Rugby World Cup rosters, where he played two matches. In 1987, Koroduadua and his team reached the quarter-finals: in the quarter-final against France, he was marked with a minus sign, as during the match he dropped the ball while he was at the very line of the French try zone, missing the opportunity to score a try and take his team to the Rugby World Cup semi-final. In 1991, with the Fijian team, he was no longer able to pass the pool stage, losing all three matches. His last international cap was during the World Cup match on 8 October 1991 against France in Grenoble. He played 27 games in total, scored 268 points (56 conversions and 47 penalties). He retired from his player career in 1994.

== After career ==
Currently, he works as a policeman in Navua. In 2020, along with other 32 citizens, Koroduadua was awarded with a medal for Fiji’s 50th independence anniversary.
