= Hernán García Simón =

Argentine rugby union player (born 1965)

- Born: Hernán Martín García Simón; October 13, 1965 (age 61) Buenos Aires

Rugby union career
- Position: Centre
Senior career
Years	Team	Apps	(Points)
1984-2001	Pueyrredón RC		
International career
Years	Team	Apps	(Points)
1990-1992	Argentina	7	(4)

Hernán Martín García Simón (born 11 January 1965 in Buenos Aires) is a former Argentine rugby union player and a current coach. He played as a centre.

García Simón played for Pueyrredón Rugby Club, in Mar Del Plata. He would be the team's captain.

He had 7 caps for Argentina, from 1990 to 1992, scoring 1 try, 4 points on aggregate. He was called for the 1991 Rugby World Cup, playing in three games and scoring the only try and points of his international career.

After ending his player career, he became a coach. He has been the coach of Pueyrredón Rugby Club.
