= Honeywell Nguruve =

- Born: 12 August 1969 (age 57) Bindura, Rhodesia
- Height: 6 ft 3 in (191 cm)
- Weight: 205 lb (93 kg)
- School: Milton High School

Rugby union career
- Position: No. 8 / Flanker
International career
| Years | Team | Apps | (Points) |
| 1990–91 | Zimbabwe | 5 | (4) |

Honeywell Nguruve (born August 12, 1969) is a Zimbabwean former international rugby union player.

== Biography ==
Nguruve, an Old Miltonian, was born in the town of Bindura and is the son of Zimbabwe's first black police commissioner Wiridzayi Nguruve. He played his rugby at Milton High School under the coaching of Sydney Dawson.

During the early 1990s, Nguruve played on the Zimbabwe national team, as a flanker, number eight and lock. He was one of four players of colour in the 1991 Rugby World Cup squad and scored a try in the match against Japan in Belfast.

Nguruve emigrated to Australia in 1993, having been signed to play rugby for Perth-Bayswater. He represented Western Australia against the touring 1993 Springboks and the following year relocated to Sydney, where he played for Randwick.
