= Martín Terán =

Argentine rugby union player and association footballer

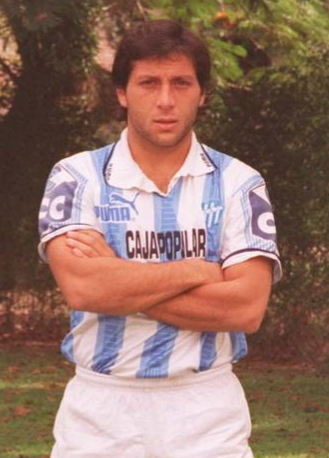
- Born: Martín José Terán Nougués; July 25, 1969 (age 57) San Miguel de Tucumán
- Height: 1.74 m (5 ft 9 in)
- Weight: 83 kg (183 lb)

Rugby union career
- Position: Wing
Senior career
Years	Team	Apps	(Points)
1988-2004	Tucumán Rugby Club		
Provincial / State sides
Years	Team	Apps	(Points)
1989	Tucumán		
International career
Years	Team	Apps	(Points)
1991-1995	Argentina	30	(50)

Martín José Terán Nougués (born San Miguel de Tucumán, 25 July 1969) is a former Argentine rugby union and association football player. He played as a wing. He is considered the best Tucumán player of the history, after Omar Hasan.

== Career ==
Terán played for Tucumán Rugby Club since 1975–76, entering the first team in 1988. He would play there until 1992–93, winning the Campeonato Argentino in 1989, 1990, 1991, 1992 and 1993.

He had 30 caps for Argentina, from 1991 to 1995, scoring 11 tries, 50 points in aggregate. He was called for the 1991 Rugby World Cup, playing in three games and scoring two tries in the 19–32 loss to Australia, at 4 October 1991, in Llanelli, and one try at the 12–35 loss to Samoa, at 13 October 1991, in Pontypridd. He was called for the 1995 Rugby World Cup, playing in three matches but not scoring.

Terán also played association football in 1995 when one of the main clubs from his city, Atlético Tucumán, made him an offer to play for the club. Playing as winger, Terán scored 11 goals for the squad that took part of "Liga Tucumana de Fútbol", the regional body of Tucumán. His high goal average made Terán to be called to the senior team that played at Primera B Nacional. Terán scored the goal v. Douglas Haig that allowed Atlético to remain in the division.

With Atlético Tucumán, Terán played six games in the 1996–97 season. At the age of 27, he retired from football, putting an end to his sports career.
