= Guillermo del Castillo =

Argentine rugby union player

- Born: December 14, 1963 (age 62) Rosario

Rugby union career
- Position: Fly-half
Senior career
Years	Team	Apps	(Points)
1983-1999	Rosario		
International career
Years	Team	Apps	(Points)
1990-1995	Argentina	15	(24)

Guillermo del Castillo (born 14 December 1963 in Rosario) is a former Argentine rugby union player. He played as a fly-half.

Del Castillo played for Jockey Club de Rosario.

He had 15 caps for Argentina, from 1991 to 1995, scoring 3 conversions, 5 penalties and 1 drop goal, 24 points on aggregate. He was called for the 1991 Rugby World Cup, playing in two games and scoring 1 conversion and 2 penalties, 8 points on aggregate. He once again would be called for the 1995 Rugby World Cup but this time he didn't leave the bench.
