= Eduardo Laborde =

Argentine rugby union player (1967–2015)

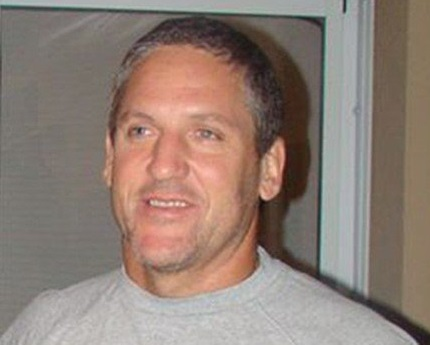
- Born: Eduardo Horacio Laborde; 19 October 1967 Buenos Aires, Argentina
- Died: 4 February 2015 (aged 47) Pinamar, Argentina

Rugby union career
- Position: Centre
Senior career
Years	Team	Apps	(Points)
1985-2003	Club Pucará		
International career
Years	Team	Apps	(Points)
1991	Argentina	3	(3)

Eduardo Horacio Laborde (19 October 1967 – 4 February 2015) was an Argentine rugby union player, who played three games for the national team Los Pumas in the 1991 Rugby World Cup.

Laborde died in February 2015 after the bicycle he was riding collided with another vehicle in the coastal town of Pinamar.
