= 1991 Rugby World Cup =

2nd Rugby World Cup

French: Coupe du monde de rugby 1991

Tournament details
- Host nations: England; France; Ireland; Scotland; Wales
- Venue: 19 (in 19 host cities)
- Dates: 3 October – 2 November (31 days)
- No. of nations: 16 (33 qualifying)

Final positions
- Champions: Australia (1st title)
- Runner-up: England
- Third place: New Zealand

Tournament statistics
- Matches played: 32
- Attendance: 1,027,827 (32,120 per match)
- Top scorer(s): (Ireland) Ralph Keyes (68)
- Most tries: (France) Jean-Baptiste Lafond (Australia) David Campese (6 tries each)

The 1991 Rugby World Cup (French: Coupe du monde de rugby 1991) was the second edition of the Rugby World Cup, and was jointly hosted by England, Scotland, Wales, Ireland and France: at the time, the five European countries who participated in the Five Nations Championship. This was the first Rugby World Cup to be staged in the northern hemisphere, with England the hosts of the final. Also for the first time, qualifying competitions were introduced as the number of entrants had increased, from 16 nations four years earlier, to 33 countries. The eight quarter-finalists from 1987 qualified automatically with the remaining eight spots contested through qualifiers by 25 countries. This resulted in only one new side qualifying for the tournament, Western Samoa replacing Tonga. The same 16-team pool/knock-out format was used with just minor changes to the points system. South Africa was again not included because of sanctions imposed on the country by the International Rugby Board (IRB), due to the government's apartheid policies.

The pool stages produced a major upset when Western Samoa, who were making their debut in the tournament, defeated the 1987 semi-finalists Wales 16–13 in Cardiff. Along with the other results in the group, this led to the elimination of Wales, who finished third in Pool 3. Also notable in pool play was that Canada finished second in their pool to qualify for the quarter-finals, which remains their best performance in the World Cup. Fiji, as quarter-finalists four years earlier, had expected to occupy that position, but after the upset loss to Canada and a hammering by France, they lost even their final match against the unfancied Romanian team. Earlier, the opening match had pitted the holders New Zealand against the hosts England: New Zealand overturned a narrow half-time deficit to win the match and the pool, both teams qualifying for the quarter-finals with easy victories in their other matches. Scotland beat Ireland to top their pool, again both teams qualifying.

In the quarter-finals, neither Canada nor Western Samoa proved a match for New Zealand or Scotland, respectively. Meanwhile, England knocked out 1987 finalist France in a bruising encounter. Australia pipped Ireland 19–18 in a thrilling match at Lansdowne Road, with a last-gasp try from fly-half Michael Lynagh coming after the Irish took an unexpected 18–15 lead. The semi-finals produced two tight matches: England overcame Scotland 9–6, a late drop goal deciding a tryless match in a torrential downpour at Murrayfield Stadium, and Australia defeated the defending champions New Zealand 16–6 at Lansdowne Road.

The final was played at Twickenham Stadium in London, and saw Australia win 12–6 against England, with a first-half try from prop Tony Daly.

== Qualification ==
The following 16 teams, shown by region, qualified for the 1991 Rugby World Cup. Of the 16 teams, eight of those places were automatically filled by quarter-finalists from the 1987 World Cup and did not have to play any qualification matches. 25 nations competed in a qualification process designed to fill the remaining eight spots, bringing the total participation to 33 nations. In the event, there was only one change from the 1987 tournament, with Western Samoa appearing in place of Tonga.

Africa	Americas	Europe	Oceania/Asia
Zimbabwe (Africa)	Argentina (Americas 2); Canada (Americas 1); United States (Americas 3)	England; France; Ireland; Italy (Europe 1); Romania (Europe 2); Scotland; Wales	Australia; Fiji; New Zealand (1987 champions); Western Samoa (Oceania/Asia 1); Japan (Oceania/Asia 2)

== Venues ==
=== Britain and Ireland ===
Locations of the 1991 Rugby World Cup host cities (Britain and Ireland)

Country	Location	Stadium	Capacity (Note: As of 1991)
England	Gloucester	Kingsholm Stadium	12,500
England	Leicester	Welford Road	16,815
England	London	Twickenham Stadium	60,000
England	Otley	Cross Green	7,500
Ireland	Belfast	Ravenhill Stadium	12,300
Ireland	Dublin	Lansdowne Road	49,250
Scotland	Edinburgh	Murrayfield Stadium	67,800
Wales	Cardiff	Cardiff Stadium	53,000
Wales	Llanelli	Stradey Park	10,800
Wales	Pontypool	Pontypool Park	8,800
Wales	Pontypridd	Sardis Road	7,200

=== France ===
Locations of the 1991 Rugby World Cup host cities (France)

Country	Location	Stadium	Capacity (Note: As of 1991)
France	Agen	Stade Armandie	14,000
France	Bayonne	Parc des Sports de Saint Léon	13,500
France	Béziers	Stade de la Méditerranée	18,000
France	Brive	Stadium Parc Municipal Des Sports	16,000
France	Grenoble	Stade Lesdiguières	18,548
France	Paris	Parc des Princes	48,712
France	Toulouse	Stade Ernest-Wallon	19,000
France	Villeneuve-d'Ascq	Stadium Nord de Villeneuve-d'Ascq	18,185

== Referees ==
- (Argentina) Efraim Sklar
- (Australia) Kerry Fitzgerald
- (Australia) Sandy MacNeill
- (England) Fred Howard
- (England) Ed Morrison
- (Fiji) Lakini Colati
- (France) René Hourquet
- (France) Patrick Robin
- (Ireland) Owen Doyle
- (Ireland) Stephen Hilditch
- (New Zealand) Dave Bishop
- (New Zealand) Keith Lawrence
- (Scotland) Brian Anderson
- (Scotland) Jim Fleming
- (United States) Don Reordan
- (Wales) Derek Bevan
- (Wales) Les Peard

== Format ==
Pool 1	Pool 2	Pool 3	Pool 4
New Zealand; England; Italy; United States	Scotland; Ireland; Japan; Zimbabwe	Australia; Wales; Western Samoa; Argentina	France; Fiji; Canada; Romania

As in the 1987 Rugby World Cup the 16 nations were divided into four pools of four nations, with each nation playing their other pool opponents once, every nation playing three times during the pool stages. Nations were awarded 2 points for a win, 1 for a draw and zero for a loss, the top two nations of every pool advanced to the quarter-finals. The runners-up of each pool faced the winners of a different pool in the quarter-finals. The winners moved on to the semi-finals, with the winners then moving onto the final, and the losers of the semi-finals contesting a third/fourth place play off.

- Pool 1 was played in England
- Pool 2 was played in both Scotland and Ireland, with matches played in both the Republic of Ireland and Northern Ireland
- Pool 3 was played in Wales
- Pool 4 was played in France

Points system

The points system that was used in the pool stage was which was changed from 1987 was as follows:

- 3 points for a win
- 2 points for a draw
- 1 point for playing

A total of 32 matches (24 in the pool stage and eight in the knock-out stage) were played throughout the tournament over 30 days from 3 October 1991 to 2 November 1991.

== Pool stage ==
=== Pool 1 ===
Team	P	W	D	L	PF	PA	Pts
New Zealand	3	3	0	0	95	39	9
England	3	2	0	1	85	33	7
Italy	3	1	0	2	57	76	5
United States	3	0	0	3	24	113	3

3 October 1991

England	12–18	New Zealand
Pen: Webb (3); Drop: Andrew		Try: Jones; Con: Fox; Pen: Fox (4)

Twickenham Stadium, London
Attendance: 57,000
Referee: Jim Fleming (Scotland)

5 October 1991

Italy	30–9	United States
Try: Barba; Francescato; Vaccari; Gaetaniello; Con: Dominguez (4); Pen: Dominguez (2)		Try: Swords; Con: Williams; Pen: Williams

Cross Green, Otley
Attendance: 7,500
Referee: Owen Doyle (Ireland)

8 October 1991

New Zealand	46–6	United States
Try: Wright (3); Earl; Purvis; Timu; Tuigamala; Innes; Con: Preston (4); Pen: Preston (2)		Pen: Williams (2)

Kingsholm, Gloucester
Attendance: 12,000
Referee: Efraim Sklar (Argentina)

8 October 1991

England	36–6	Italy
Try: Guscott (2); Underwood; Webb; Con: Webb (4); Pen: Webb (4)		Try: Cuttitta; Con: Dominguez

Twickenham Stadium, London
Attendance: 30,000
Referee: Brian Anderson (Scotland)

11 October 1991

England	37–9	United States
Try: Underwood (2); Carling; Skinner; Heslop; Con: Hodgkinson (4); Pen: Hodgkinson (3)		Try: Nelson; Con: Williams; Pen: Williams

Twickenham Stadium, London
Attendance: 45,000
Referee: Les Peard (Wales)

13 October 1991

Italy	21–31	New Zealand
Try: Cuttitta; Bonomi; Con: Dominguez (2); Pen: Dominguez (3)	Report	Try: Brooke; Innes; Tuigamala; Hewett; Con: Fox (3); Pen: Fox (3)

Welford Road, Leicester
Attendance: 15,711
Referee: Kerry Fitzgerald (Australia)

=== Pool 2 ===
Team	P	W	D	L	PF	PA	Pts
Scotland	3	3	0	0	122	36	9
Ireland	3	2	0	1	102	51	7
Japan	3	1	0	2	77	87	5
Zimbabwe	3	0	0	3	31	158	3

5 October 1991

Scotland	47–9	Japan
Try: S. Hastings; Stanger; Chalmers; White; Penalty try Tukalo; G. Hastings; Con: G. Hastings (5); Pen: G. Hastings (2); Chalmers	Report	Try: Hosokawa; Con: Hosokawa; Drop: Hosokawa

Murrayfield Stadium, Edinburgh
Attendance: 40,000
Referee: Ed Morrison (England)

6 October 1991

Ireland	55–11	Zimbabwe
Try: Robinson (4); Popplewell (2); Geoghegan; Curtis; Con: Keyes (4); Pen: Keyes (5)	Report	Try: Dawson; Schultz; Pen: Ferreira

Lansdowne Road, Dublin
Attendance: 40,000
Referee: Keith Lawrence (New Zealand)

9 October 1991

Ireland	32–16	Japan
Try: Mannion (2); O'Hara; Staples; Con: Keyes (2); Pen: Keyes (4)	Report	Try: Hayashi; Kajihara; Yoshida; Con: Hosokawa (2)

Lansdowne Road, Dublin
Attendance: 30,000
Referee: Laikini Colati (Fiji)

9 October 1991

Scotland	51–12	Zimbabwe
Try: Tukalo (3); Turnbull; S. Hastings; Stanger; Weir; White; Con: Dods (5); Pen: Dods (2); Drop: Wylie	Report	Try: Garvey (2); Con: Currin (2)

Murrayfield Stadium, Edinburgh
Attendance: 35,000
Referee: Don Reordan (United States)

12 October 1991

Scotland	24–15	Ireland
Try: Shiel; Armstrong; Con: G. Hastings (2); Pen: G. Hastings (3); Drop: Chalmers	Report	Pen: Keyes (4); Drop: Keyes

Murrayfield Stadium, Edinburgh
Attendance: 60,000
Referee: Fred Howard (England)

14 October 1991

Japan	52–8	Zimbabwe
Try: Yoshida (2); Mashuho (2); Kutsuki (2); Horikoshi; Luaiufi; Matsuo; Con: Hosokawa (2); Pen: Hosokawa (4)	Report	Try: Tsimba; Nguruve

Ravenhill, Belfast
Attendance: 9,500
Referee: René Hourquet (France)

=== Pool 3 ===
Team	P	W	D	L	PF	PA	Pts
Australia	3	3	0	0	79	25	9
Western Samoa	3	2	0	1	54	34	7
Wales	3	1	0	2	32	61	5
Argentina	3	0	0	3	38	83	3

4 October 1991

Argentina	19–32	Australia
Try: Terán (2); Con: Del Castillo; Pen: Del Castillo; Drop: Arbizu (2)		Try: Campese (2); Horan (2); Kearns; Con: Lynagh (3); Pen: Lynagh (2)

Stradey Park, Llanelli
Attendance: 11,000
Referee: Dave Bishop (New Zealand)

6 October 1991

Wales	13–16	Western Samoa
Try: Emyr; Evans; Con: Ring; Pen: Ring	Report	Try: Vaega; Vaifale; Con: Vaea; Pen: Vaea (2)

National Stadium, Cardiff
Attendance: 45,000
Referee: Patrick Robin (France)

9 October 1991

Australia	9–3	Western Samoa
Pen: Lynagh (3)		Pen: Vaea

Pontypool Park, Pontypool
Attendance: 15,000
Referee: Ed Morrison (England)

9 October 1991

Wales	16–7	Argentina
Try: Arnold; Pen: Ring (3); Rayer		Try: García Simón; Pen: Del Castillo

National Stadium, Cardiff
Attendance: 35,000
Referee: René Hourquet (France)

12 October 1991

Wales	3–38	Australia
Pen: Ring		Try: Roebuck (2); Slattery; Campese; Horan; Lynagh; Con: Lynagh (4); Pen: Lynagh (2)

National Stadium, Cardiff
Attendance: 54,000
Referee: Keith Lawrence (New Zealand)

13 October 1991

Argentina	12–35	Western Samoa
Try: Terán; Con: Arbizu; Pen: Laborde; Arbizu		Try: Tagaloa (2); Lima (2); Bunce; Bachop; Con: Vaea (4); Pen: Vaea

Sardis Road, Pontypridd
Attendance: 8,500
Referee: Brian Anderson (Scotland)
Replaced by Jim Fleming (Scotland) at halftime

=== Pool 4 ===
Team	P	W	D	L	PF	PA	Pts
France	3	3	0	0	82	25	9
Canada	3	2	0	1	45	33	7
Romania	3	1	0	2	31	64	5
Fiji	3	0	0	3	27	63	3

4 October 1991

France	30–3	Romania
Try: Roumat; Lafond; Penalty try Saint-André; Con: Camberabero; Pen: Camberabero (4)		Pen: Nichitean

Stade de la Méditerranée, Béziers
Attendance: 22,000
Referee: Les Peard (Wales)

5 October 1991

Canada	13–3	Fiji
Try: Stewart; Pen: Rees (3)		Drop: Serevi

Stade Jean Dauger, Bayonne
Attendance: 5,000
Referee: Kerry Fitzgerald (Australia)

8 October 1991

France	33–9	Fiji
Try: Lafond (3); Sella (2); Camberabero; Con: Camberabero (3); Pen: Camberabero		Try: Naruma; Con: Koroduadua; Pen: Koroduadua

Stade Lesdiguières, Grenoble
Attendance: 18,548
Referee: Derek Bevan (Wales)

9 October 1991

Canada	19–11	Romania
Try: McKinnon; Ennis; Con: Wyatt; Pen: Wyatt (2); Drop: Rees		Try: Lungu; Sasu; Pen: Nichitean

Stade Ernest-Wallon, Toulouse
Attendance: 10,000
Referee: Sandy MacNeill (Australia)

12 October 1991

Fiji	15–17	Romania
Pen: Turuva (2); Drop: Rabaka (2); Turuva		Try: Ion; Dumitras; Sasu; Con: Racean; Pen: Nichitean

Parc Municipal des Sports, Brive
Attendance: 8,500
Referee: Owen Doyle (Ireland)

13 October 1991

France	19–13	Canada
Try: Lafond; Saint-André; Con: Camberabero; Pen: Lacroix (2); Camberabero		Try: Wyatt; Pen: Wyatt; Rees; Drop: Rees

Stade Armandie, Agen
Attendance: 15,000
Referee: Stephen Hilditch (Ireland)

== Knockout stage ==
Quarter-finals
19 October – Edinburgh
Scotland	28
Western Samoa	6
19 October – Paris
France	10
England	19
20 October – Lille
New Zealand	29
Canada	13
20 October – Dublin
Australia	19
Ireland	18

Semi-finals
26 October – Edinburgh
Scotland	6
England	9
27 October – Dublin
New Zealand	6
Australia	16

Final
2 November – London
England	6
Australia	12
Third place
30 October – Cardiff
Scotland	6
New Zealand	13

=== Quarter-finals ===
19 October 1991

France	10–19	England
Try: Lafond; Pen: Lacroix (2)	Report	Try: Underwood; Carling; Con: Webb; Pen: Webb (3)

Parc des Princes, Paris
Attendance: 48,500
Referee: Dave Bishop (New Zealand)

19 October 1991

Scotland	28–6	Western Samoa
Try: Jeffrey (2); Stanger; Con: Hastings (2); Pen: Hastings (4)	Report	Pen: Vaea; Drop: Bachop

Murrayfield Stadium, Edinburgh
Attendance: 54,000
Referee: Derek Bevan (Wales)

20 October 1991

Ireland	18–19	Australia
Try: Hamilton; Con: Keyes; Pen: Keyes (3); Drop: Keyes	Report	Try: Campese (2); Lynagh; Con: Lynagh (2); Pen: Lynagh

Lansdowne Road, Dublin
Attendance: 54,500
Referee: Jim Fleming (Scotland)

20 October 1991

Canada	13–29	New Zealand
Try: Tynan; Charron; Con: Rees; Pen: Wyatt	Report	Try: Timu (2); McCahill; Brooke; Kirwan; Con: Fox (3); Pen: Fox

Stadium Lille-Metropole, Villeneuve-d'Ascq
Attendance: 30,360
Referee: Fred Howard (England)

=== Semi-finals ===
26 October 1991

Scotland	6–9	England
Pen: G. Hastings (2)	Report	Pen: Webb (2); Drop: Andrew

Murrayfield Stadium, Edinburgh
Attendance: 54,000
Referee: Kerry Fitzgerald (Australia)

27 October 1991

Australia	16–6	New Zealand
Try: Campese; Horan; Con: Lynagh; Pen: Lynagh (2)	Report	Pen: Fox (2)

Lansdowne Road, Dublin
Attendance: 54,000
Referee: Jim Fleming (Scotland)

=== Third-place play-off ===
30 October 1991

New Zealand	13–6	Scotland
Try: Little; Pen: Preston (3)	Report	Pen: G. Hastings (2)

National Stadium, Cardiff
Attendance: 47,000
Referee: Stephen Hilditch (Ireland)

=== Final ===
2 November 1991

Australia	12–6	England
Try: Daly; Con: Lynagh; Pen: Lynagh (2)	Report	Pen: Webb (2)

Twickenham Stadium, London
Attendance: 56,208
Referee: Derek Bevan (Wales)

== Statistics ==
The tournament's top point scorer was Ireland's Ralph Keyes, who scored 68 points. David Campese and Jean-Baptiste Lafond scored the most tries, six in total.

Top 10 point scorers
Player	Team	Position	Played	Tries	Conversions	Penalties	Drop goals	Total points
Ralph Keyes	Ireland	Fly-half	4	0	7	16	2	68
Michael Lynagh	Australia	Fly-half	6	2	11	12	0	66
Gavin Hastings	Scotland	Fullback	5	1	9	13	0	61
Jonathan Webb	England	Fullback	5	1	5	14	0	56
Grant Fox	New Zealand	Fly-half	4	0	7	10	0	44
Didier Camberabero	France	Fly-half	3	1	5	6	0	32
Diego Dominguez	Italy	Fly-half	3	0	7	5	0	29
Takahiro Hosokawa	Japan	Fullback	3	1	8	2	1	29
Mathew Vaea	Western Samoa	Scrum-half	4	0	5	5	0	25
David Campese	Australia	Wing	6	6	0	0	0	24
Jean-Baptiste Lafond	France	Centre	6	6	0	0	0	24

== Broadcasters ==
The event was broadcast in the United Kingdom by ITV who took over the rights from the BBC. 13 million people in the United Kingdom watched the final. In Australia it was the second and the last (as of the 2023 tournament) Rugby World Cup to be broadcast on ABC television as, from 1995, the commercial networks 7, 9 and 10 would all take over the broadcast rights sometimes in partnership with pay and streaming broadcasters Fox and Stan. In New Zealand, it was broadcast by TVNZ. In France, it was broadcast by TF1 instead of France's traditional Rugby broadcasters Antenne2. In Ireland it was broadcast by RTÉ. ITV, TF1 and RTE were the host broadcasters broadcasting the pictures around the world as well to their own countries.
