= Ekeroma Luaiufi =

Japan & Samoa international rugby union player

- Born: Ekeroma Tifaga Luaiufi; 8 May 1963 (age 63) Samoa
- University: University of Canterbury

Rugby union career
- Position: Lock
Amateur team(s)
Years	Team	Apps	(Points)
1986-1987	University of Canterbury		
Senior career
Years	Team	Apps	(Points)
1990-1991	NikoNikoDo		
Provincial / State sides
Years	Team	Apps	(Points)
1986	Canterbury B	1	(0)
International career
Years	Team	Apps	(Points)
1987-1988	Samoa	4	(0)
1990-1991	Japan	11	(4)

Ekeroma Tifaga Luaiufi, also spelled Lauaiufi (born 8 July 1963), is a former Samoan rugby union player, who also played for Japan. He played as a lock.

== Career ==
He started to play for Samoa during a test match against Fiji, at Suva, on 22 August 1987. His last match for Samoa was during a test match against Fiji, at Apia, on 4 June 1988. Two years later, Luaiufi started to play for Japan in the match against Fiji, at Tokyo, on 4 March 1990. He was part of the Japan team at 1991 Rugby World Cup, where he played three matches and scored a try in the match against Zimbabwe, at Belfast, on 14 October. He retired after the World Cup. In his club career, he played for Canterbury in New Zealand and for NikoNikoDo, a team managed by Youme Mart, based in Kumamoto in Japan.
