= Brian Currin (rugby union) =

- Full name: Brian Stanley Currin
- Born: 15 September 1960 (age 66) Gweru, Rhodesia
- Height: 6 ft 0 in (183 cm)
- Weight: 189 lb (86 kg)

Rugby union career
- Position: Fullback
International career
Years	Team	Apps	(Points)
1991	Zimbabwe	3	(4)

Brian Stanley Currin (born 15 September 1960) is a Zimbabwean former international rugby union player.

Currin was born in Gweru, Midlands Province, and raised on his family farm.

A fullback, Currin captained Zimbabwe at the 1991 Rugby World Cup, where the team was grouped with Ireland, Scotland and Japan. He kicked two conversions in Zimbabwe's loss to Scotland at Murrayfield.

Currin now lives in the United Kingdom.
