= Terunori Masuho =

Japan international rugby union player

- Born: January 29, 1972 (age 54) Tokyo, Japan
- Height: 5 ft 11 in (1.80 m)
- Weight: 169 lb (77 kg)
- School: Johoku Academy High School
- University: Waseda University

Rugby union career
- Position: Wing
Amateur team(s)
Years	Team	Apps	(Points)
1987-1990	Johoku Junior and High School		
1990-1994	Waseda University RFC		
Senior career
Years	Team	Apps	(Points)
1994-2004	Kobe Steel		
International career
Years	Team	Apps	(Points)
1991-2001	Japan	47	(147)
Coaching career
- Years: Team
- 2004-2007: Kobelco Steelers
- 2015-2017: Rugirl7

Terunori Masuho (増保輝則, Masuho Terunori) (born 29 January 1972 in Tokyo) is a former rugby union player who played as a wing and former Kobelco Steelers coach.

== Biography ==
Masuho was educated at Shokutoku Elementary School, Johoku High School, as well Waseda University. He started playing rugby at Johoku High School and took part to a tour in Scotland as captain for the Japan high school national team during his third year in high school. After going to Waseda University, in 1991, Masuho was called up in the Japan national team at 19 years and 3 months, becoming at the time the youngest player of the Japanese national team in the post-war period, debuting against USA at Chicago, on 4 May. He won the second place in the University championship while studying abroad. In 1994, he joined Kobe Steel and was active as a central player since his first year in the team. In the 1995 Rugby World Cup, he was bashed by the media as one of the responsibles for the defeat against New Zealand, but after that, he was feeling about being overweight since his college days, later, he got in shape, regaining his original physique and then returned to the national side. In 1999, Masuho was appointed captain for Kobe Steel. Between 1999 and 2000, he achieved two consecutive victories in the Japan Company Rugby Football Championship. He also played the 1991 and the 1999 Rugby World Cups. After retiring from his player career in 2004, Masuho was appointed coach for Kobelco Steelers. In 2012, Masuho worked as general manager and advisor of Waseda University RFC resigning in 2015, to then coach the women's rugby sevens club Rugirl 7, from which he resigned at the end of February 2017. Since 2013, Masuho was appointed ambassador for the 2019 Rugby World Cup, conducting public relations activities and spreading the World Cup success nationwide.
