= Mathew Vaea =

Samoa international rugby union player

- Born: 12 September 1966 (age 60) Motootua, Samoa
- School: Wanganui Collegiate School
- Occupation: Tourism promoter

Rugby union career
- Position: Scrum-half
Amateur team(s)
Years	Team	Apps	(Points)
1984	Wanganui Collegiate		
1985	College OB		
1992	Helensville		
Senior career
Years	Team	Apps	(Points)
1986–2002	Marist St. Joseph		
Provincial / State sides
Years	Team	Apps	(Points)
1984	Wanganui	1	
1985	Wellington	1	
1992	North Harbour	4	
International career
Years	Team	Apps	(Points)
1991-1995	Samoa	8	(25)
Coaching career
- Years: Team
- 1998-2003: Rugby Leonessa

Tuala Mathew M. Vaea (born 12 September 1966 in Motootua) is a Samoan rugby union retired player who played as a scrum-half. He was the manager of the Manu Samoa at the 2011 Rugby World Cup.

== Playing career ==
While his international debut was against Waikato on 9 April 1991, is international debut was during a test match against Tonga, at Nuku'alofa, on 28 May 1991. He was part of the 1991 Rugby World Cup roster. In 8 games he scored 25 points - out of 25 points he scored 8 thanks to a try and two penalties in the Western Samoa's victory in the 1991 Rugby World Cup against Wales. His last match was against Scotland, at Murrayfield, on 18 November 1995. Vaea also played for the Samoan Barbarians against Toulouse in 1991 as well.

== Manager ==
During the 2011 Rugby World Cup he was the manager of the Samoa national rugby union team, but after the World Cup his home village fined him 100 pigs (about US $25,000) for "bad behaviour". as it turned out, Vaea, who had a Tuala title, he did not fulfill his duties as coach during his stay in New Zealand, treating the campaign in New Zealand like a "holiday" and he often drank. According to the Samoan fans, Samoa did not pass the pool stage, contrary to the expectations after the victory against Australia. Vaea paid the equivalent of a fine of 2000 tala (about £535 or US $840) and apologised to the village elders. In connection with the scandal, the President of the Samoa Rugby Union and Prime Minister Tuilaepa Sailele Malielegaoi demanded to conduct an audit and provide all data on the costs of the Samoan national team during the World Cup. After the dismissal, it was announced that they were looking for a new manager for the national team. As of March 2018, Vaea has been appointed as CEO of the Samoa Association of Sports and National Olympic Committee.
