= Stephen Hilditch =

- Born: June 6, 1946 (age 80) Whitehead, County Antrim

Rugby union career
Refereeing career
Years	Competition	Apps
- Rugby World Cup

Stephen Hilditch MBE (born Whitehead, County Antrim on 6 June 1946) is a former Irish international rugby union referee from Northern Ireland who has refereed matches to World Cup level. He was a member of the Ireland International Referee Panel from 1984 until 1995, and has been an IRB international referee selector since 2003.

He was President of the Ulster Branch of the Irish Rugby Football Union (IRFU) for the 2003 / 2004 season. He joined the IRFU Committee in June 2004, becoming President of the organisation in the 2016/2017 season.

Hilditch worked as a physics teacher at Grosvenor Grammar School, then Vice Principal of Wallace High School, and finally Headmaster of Belfast High School before retiring in 2006.

He was appointed MBE in the 1995 New Year Honours.
