= Takahiro Hosokawa =

Japan international rugby union player

- Born: April 1, 1967 (age 59) Kyoto, Japan
- School: Fushimi Industrial High School
- University: Doshisha University

Rugby union career
- Position: Fullback
Amateur team(s)
Years	Team	Apps	(Points)
- Fushimi Industrial HS
?-1989	Doshisha University RFC		
Senior career
Years	Team	Apps	(Points)
1989-1994	Kobe Steel		
International career
Years	Team	Apps	(Points)
1990-1993	Japan	10	(115)

Takahiro Hosokawa (細川隆弘, Hosokawa Takahiro) (born 1 April 1967, in Kyoto) is a former Japanese rugby union footballer. He played as a fullback.

== National career ==
Hosokawa played for the Kobe Steel team in the Japanese domestic competition.

== International career ==
Hosokawa had only 10 caps for Japan, from 1990 to 1993, but he nevertheless scored 3 tries, 14 conversions, 24 penalties and 1 drop goal, in an aggregate of 115 points.

His first match was a 28–16 win over Tonga, at 8 April 1990, in Tokyo, and his last match was a 45–20 loss to Argentina, at 22 May 1993, in Buenos Aires.

Hosokawa was the top scorer for Japan at the 1991 Rugby World Cup finals, playing in all the three matches, where he scored 1 try, 8 conversions, 2 penalties and 1 drop goal, 29 points in aggregate.
