= Yoshihito Yoshida =

Japan international rugby union player

- Born: 18 February 1969 (age 57) Ogachi, Japan
- School: Akita Technical High School
- University: Meiji University

Rugby union career
- Position: Wing
Amateur team(s)
Years	Team	Apps	(Points)
- Akita Technical High School
–	Meiji University		
Senior career
Years	Team	Apps	(Points)
1991-2000	Isetan		
2000-2001	US Colomiers		
2001-2003	Sanyo Electric		
2003-2004	Fukuoka Sanix Bombs		
International career
Years	Team	Apps	(Points)
1988-1997	Japan	30	(97)
National sevens team
Years	Team		Comps
1991-1993	Japan 7s		101993
Coaching career
- Years: Team
- 2004-2009: Yokogawa Musashino Atlastars
- 2009-2014: Meiji University Rugby Football Club
- 2014-: Samurai Seven

Yoshihito Yoshida (吉田義人, Yoshida Yoshihito) (born 18 February 1969 in Ogachi, Akita) is a former rugby union footballer who played for Japan. He played as a wing.

== Career ==
His first match for Japan was during a test against Oxford University at Tokyo, on October 1, 1990. He played 1991 Rugby World Cup, where he scored 2 tries against Zimbabwe, at Ravenhill. He was also part of the 1995 Rugby World Cup, playing against Ireland, where he scored 2 tries and 4 conversions, and against New Zealand. His last international cap was against USA, at Osaka, on May 25, 1997.

== Club career ==
He played for Isetan between 1991 and 2000. Later he played for the French side US Colomiers for two seasons. Between 2001 and 2003, he played for Sanyo Electric, the following year, he ended his career for Fukuoka Sanix Bombs. In 1992, he also played for World XV against the All Blacks.

== Coach career ==
In 2004 he coached Yokogawa Musashino Atlastars until 2009, when he coached Meiji University, where he played back in his amateur years. Since 2014, he coaches the rugby sevens club Samurai Seven

== Personal life ==
In 2008, he married the singer and songwriter Ari Ōnishi.
