= 1987 Rugby World Cup Pool 3 =

External videos
- Rugby World Cup 1987: Argentina v Fiji on YouTube

Pool 3 of the 1987 Rugby World Cup began on 22 May and was completed on 1 June. The pool was composed of New Zealand, Fiji, Argentina and Italy.

== Standings ==
Team	Pld	W	D	L	PF	PA	PD	T	Pts	Qualification
New Zealand	3	3	0	0	190	34	+156	30	6	Knockout stage
Fiji	3	1	0	2	56	101	−45	6	2 (Note: Fiji qualified for the highest number of tries (Fiji 6, Italy 5, Argentina 4))	Knockout stage
Italy	3	1	0	2	40	110	−70	5	2	
Argentina	3	1	0	2	49	90	−41	4	2	

== New Zealand vs Italy ==
22 May 1987

New Zealand	70–6	Italy
Try: Kirwan (2); Kirk (2); Green (2); Penalty try Jones; Taylor; McDowell; Stanley; Whetton; Con: Fox (8); Pen: Fox (2)	Report	Pen: Collodo; Drop: Collodo

Eden Park, Auckland
Attendance: 20,000
Referee: Bob Fordham (Australia)

New Zealand	Italy

FB	15	John Gallagher
RW	14	John Kirwan
OC	13	Joe Stanley
IC	12	Warwick Taylor
LW	11	Craig Green
FH	10	Grant Fox
SH	9	David Kirk (c)
N8	8	Buck Shelford
OF	7	Michael Jones
BF	6	Alan Whetton
RL	5	Gary Whetton
LL	4	Murray Pierce
TP	3	Steve McDowall
HK	2	Sean Fitzpatrick
LP	1	Richard Loe
Replacements:
WG	16	Terry Wright
FH	17	Frano Botica
SH	18	Bruce Deans
N8	19	Zinzan Brooke
LK	20	Albert Anderson
PR	21	John Drake
Coach:
(New Zealand) Brian Lochore

FB	15	Serafino Ghizzoni
RW	14	Massimo Mascioletti
OC	13	Fabio Gaetaniello
IC	12	Oscar Collodo
LW	11	Marcello Cuttitta
FH	10	Rodolfo Ambrosio
SH	9	Fulvio Lorigiola
N8	8	Giuseppe Artuso
OF	7	Marzio Innocenti (c)
BF	6	Piergianni Farina
RL	5	Mauro Gardin
LL	4	Franco Berni
TP	3	Tito Lupini
HK	2	Giorgio Morelli
LP	1	Guido Rossi
Replacements:
FB	16	Daniele Tebaldi
CE	17	Sergio Zorzi
SH	18	Alessandro Ghini
FL	19	Mario Pavin
LK	20	Antonio Colella
PR	21	Stefano Romagnoli
Coach:
(Italy) Marco Bollesan

== Argentina vs Fiji ==
24 May 1987

Argentina	9–28	Fiji
Try: Penalty try Con: Porta; Pen: Porta	Report	Try: Gale; Naivilawasa; Nalaga; Savai; Con: Koroduadua (2); Rokowailoa; Pen: Koroduadua (2)

Rugby Park, Hamilton
Attendance: 13,000
Referee: Jim Fleming (Scotland)

Argentina	Fiji

FB	15	Sebastián Salvat
RW	14	Marcelo Campo
OC	13	Diego Cuesta Silva
IC	12	Fabián Turnes
LW	11	Juan Lanza
FH	10	Hugo Porta (c)
SH	9	Fabio Gómez
N8	8	Gabriel Travaglini
OF	7	José Mostany
BF	6	Jorge Allen
RL	5	Gustavo Milano	(substituted off) 53'
LL	4	Eliseo Branca
TP	3	Luis Molina
HK	2	Diego Cash
LP	1	Fernando Morel
Replacements:
WG	16	Pedro Lanza
FH	17	Rafael Madero
SH	18	Martín Yangüela
FL	19	Alejandro Schiavio	(substituted in) 53'
PR	20	Serafín Dengra
HK	21	Julio Clement
Coach:
(Argentina) Héctor Silva and Ángel Guastella

FB	15	Severo Koroduadua
RW	14	Serupepeli Tuvula
OC	13	Epineri Naituku
IC	12	Tomasi Cama
LW	11	Kavekini Nalaga
FH	10	Elia Rokowailoa
SH	9	Pauliasi Tabulutu	(substituted off) 22'
N8	8	John Sanday
OF	7	Manasa Qoro
BF	6	Peceli Gale	(substituted off) 55'
RL	5	Ilaitia Savai
LL	4	Koli Rakoroi (c)
TP	3	Rusiate Namoro
HK	2	Salacieli Naivilawasa
LP	1	Sairusi Naituku
Replacements:
FH	16	Paulo Nawalu	(substituted in) 22'
CE	17	Sirilo Lovokuro
FB	18	Jone Kubu
HK	19	Epeli Rakai
FL	20	Livai Kididromo
FL	21	Samuela Vunivalu	(substituted in) 55'
Coach:
(Fiji) Jo Sovau

== New Zealand vs Fiji ==
27 May 1987

New Zealand	74–13	Fiji
Try: Gallagher (4); Green (4); Kirk; Kirwan; Penalty try Whetton; Con: Fox (10); Pen: Fox (2)	Report	Try: Cama; Pen: Koroduadua (3)

Lancaster Park, Christchurch
Attendance: 25,000
Referee: Derek Bevan (Wales)

New Zealand	Fiji

FB	15	John Gallagher
RW	14	John Kirwan
OC	13	Joe Stanley
IC	12	Warwick Taylor
LW	11	Craig Green
FH	10	Grant Fox
SH	9	David Kirk (c)
N8	8	Buck Shelford
OF	7	Michael Jones
BF	6	Alan Whetton
RL	5	Gary Whetton
LL	4	Albert Anderson
TP	3	John Drake
HK	2	Sean Fitzpatrick
LP	1	Steve McDowall
Replacements:
WG	16	Terry Wright
FH	17	Frano Botica
SH	18	Bruce Deans
FL	19	Mark Brooke-Cowden
LK	20	Andy Earl
PR	21	Richard Loe
Coach:
(New Zealand) Brian Lochore

FB	15	Severo Koroduadua
RW	14	Serupepeli Tuvula
OC	13	Sirilo Lovokuro
IC	12	Jone Kubu
LW	11	Tomasi Cama
FH	10	Elia Rokowailoa
SH	9	Paulo Nawalu
N8	8	Koli Rakoroi
OF	7	Samuela Vunivalu
BF	6	Livai Kididromo
RL	5	Ilaitia Savai
LL	4	Jioji Cama
TP	3	Peni Volavola
HK	2	Epeli Rakai
LP	1	Mosese Taga
Replacements:
PR	16	Sairusi Naituku
CE	17	Tom Mitchell
WG	18	Kavekini Nalaga
HK	19	Salacieli Naivilawasa
CE	20	Epineri Naituku
FL	21	Manasa Qoro
Coach:
(Fiji) Jo Sovau

== Argentina vs Italy ==
28 May 1987

Argentina	25–16	Italy
Try: Lanza; Gómez; Con: Porta; Pen: Porta (5)	Report	Try: Innocenti; Cuttitta; Con: Collodo; Pen: Collodo (2)

Lancaster Park, Christchurch
Attendance: 2,000
Referee: Roger Quittenton (England)

Argentina	Italy

FB	15	Sebastián Salvat
RW	14	Juan Lanza
OC	13	Diego Cuesta Silva
IC	12	Rafael Madero
LW	11	Pedro Lanza
FH	10	Hugo Porta (c)
SH	9	Martín Yangüela	(substituted off) 62'
N8	8	Gabriel Travaglini
OF	7	Alejandro Schiavio
BF	6	Jorge Allen
RL	5	Sergio Carossio
LL	4	Eliseo Branca
TP	3	Luis Molina
HK	2	Diego Cash
LP	1	Serafín Dengra
Replacements:
WG	16	Guillermo Angaut
FH	17	Marcelo Campo
SH	18	Fabio Gómez	(substituted in) 62'
FL	19	José Mostany
PR	20	Fernando Morel
HK	21	Julio Clement
Coach:
(Argentina) Héctor Silva and Ángel Guastella

FB	15	Daniele Tebaldi
RW	14	Massimo Mascioletti
OC	13	Fabio Gaetaniello
IC	12	Stefano Barba
LW	11	Marcello Cuttitta
FH	10	Oscar Collodo
SH	9	Fulvio Lorigiola
N8	8	Gianni Zanon
OF	7	Marzio Innocenti (c)
BF	6	Mario Pavin
RL	5	Antonio Colella
LL	4	Mauro Gardin
TP	3	Tito Lupini
HK	2	Antonio Galeazzo
LP	1	Guido Rossi
Replacements:
PR	16	Stefano Romagnoli
LK	17	Franco Berni
FL	18	Raffaele Dolfato
SH	19	Alessandro Ghini
FH	20	Rodolfo Ambrosio
CE	21	Sergio Zorzi
Coach:
(Italy) Marco Bollesan

== Fiji vs Italy ==
31 May 1987

Fiji	15–18	Italy
Try: Naivilawasa; Con: Koroduadua; Pen: Koroduadua (2); Drop: Qoro		Try: Cuttitta; Cucchiella; Mascioletti; Pen: Collodo; Drop: Collodo

Carisbrook, Dunedin
Attendance: 13,000
Referee: Keith Lawrence (New Zealand)

Fiji	Italy

FB	15	Severo Koroduadua
RW	14	Serupepeli Tuvula	(substituted off) 20'
OC	13	Kaiava Salusalu
IC	12	Tom Mitchell
LW	11	Tomasi Cama
FH	10	Elia Rokowailoa
SH	9	Paulo Nawalu
N8	8	Koli Rakoroi (c)
OF	7	John Sanday
BF	6	Manasa Qoro
RL	5	Ilaitia Savai
LL	4	Aisake Nadolo
TP	3	Peni Volavola
HK	2	Salacieli Naivilawasa
LP	1	Sairusi Naituku
Replacements:
FL	16	Apisai Nagata
FB	17	Jone Kubu		(substituted in) 62'
CE	18	Epineri Naituku	(substituted in) 20'	(substituted off) 62'
HK	19	Mosese Taga
PR	20	Rusiate Namoro
FL	21	Livai Kididromo
Coach:
(Fiji) Jo Sovau

FB	15	Daniele Tebaldi
RW	14	Massimo Mascioletti
OC	13	Fabio Gaetaniello
IC	12	Stefano Barba
LW	11	Marcello Cuttitta
FH	10	Oscar Collodo
SH	9	Alessandro Ghini
N8	8	Piergianni Farina
OF	7	Marzio Innocenti (c)
BF	6	Raffaele Dolfato
RL	5	Antonio Colella
LL	4	Mauro Gardin
TP	3	Tito Lupini
HK	2	Stefano Romagnoli
LP	1	Giancarlo Cucchiella
Replacements:
HK	16	Antonio Galeazzo
LK	17	Franco Berni
FL	18	Giuseppe Artuso
SH	19	Fulvio Lorigiola
FH	20	Rodolfo Ambrosio
CE	21	Sergio Zorzi
Coach:
(Italy) Marco Bollesan

== New Zealand vs Argentina ==
1 June 1987

New Zealand	46–15	Argentina
Try: Kirk; Brooke; Stanley; Earl; Crowley; Whetton; Con: Fox (2); Pen: Fox (6)		Try: Lanza; Con: Porta; Pen: Porta (3)

Athletic Park, Wellington
Attendance: 30,000
Referee: Roger Quittenton (England)

New Zealand	Argentina

FB	15	Kieran Crowley
RW	14	John Kirwan
OC	13	Joe Stanley
IC	12	Bernie McCahill
LW	11	Terry Wright
FH	10	Grant Fox
SH	9	David Kirk (c)
N8	8	Andy Earl
OF	7	Zinzan Brooke
BF	6	Alan Whetton
RL	5	Gary Whetton
LL	4	Murray Pierce
TP	3	John Drake
HK	2	Sean Fitzpatrick
LP	1	Richard Loe
Replacements:
FB	16	John Gallagher
FH	17	Frano Botica
SH	18	Bruce Deans
FL	19	Mark Brooke-Cowden
LK	20	Albert Anderson
PR	21	Steve McDowall
Coach:
(New Zealand) Brian Lochore

FB	15	Guillermo Angaut
RW	14	Marcelo Campo
OC	13	Rafael Madero
IC	12	Fabián Turnes	(substituted off) 80'
LW	11	Juan Lanza
FH	10	Hugo Porta (c)
SH	9	Fabio Gómez
N8	8	Gabriel Travaglini	(substituted off) 80'
OF	7	Alejandro Schiavio
BF	6	Jorge Allen
RL	5	Gustavo Milano
LL	4	Eliseo Branca
TP	3	Luis Molina
HK	2	Diego Cash
LP	1	Serafín Dengra
Replacements:
WG	16	Pedro Lanza	(substituted in) 80'
FH	17	Marcelo Faggi
FL	18	José Mostany	(substituted in) 80'
LK	19	Roberto Cobelo
HK	20	Julio Clement
Coach:
(Argentina) Héctor Silva and Ángel Guastella
