= 1985 Fiji rugby union tour of British Isles =

Summary
P	W	D	L
Total
10	5	0	5
Test match
2	0	0	2
Opponent
P	W	D	L
IrelandXV
1	0	0	1
Wales
1	0	0	1

The 1985 Fiji rugby union tour of British Isles was a series of matches played in October 1985 in Wales, Ireland, and England by the Fiji national rugby union team.

== Results ==
9 October 1985

Cross Keys	12 - 26	Fiji XV
	report

Crosskeys
Referee: Gareth Simmonds ( (Wales) -WRU)

12 October 1985

Cardiff	31 - 15	Fiji XV
	report

Cardiff
Referee: Winston Jones ( (Wales) -WRU)

16 October 1985

Swansea	14 - 23	Fiji XV
	report

Swansea
Referee: D. Hughes ( (Wales) -WRU)

19 October 1985

Ireland XV	16 - 15	Fiji
	report

Lansdowne Road, Dublin
Referee: W. Bevan ( (Wales) -WRU)

Ireland XV			Fiji
Hugo MacNeill	FB	15	FB	Epeli Turuva
Michael Kiernan	W	14	W	Jimi Damu
Brendan Mullin	C	13	C	Sanivalati Laulau
John Hewitt	C	12	C	Tomasi Cama
Keith Crossan	W	11	W	Serupepeli Tuvula
Paul Dean	FH	10	FH	Acura Niuqila
Michael Bradley	SH	9	SH	Paula Nawalu
Brian Spillane	N8	8	N8	Esala Teleni (capt.)
William Sexton	F	7	F	Peceli Gale
Philip Matthews	F	6	F	Iokimi Finau
Willie Anderson	L	5	L	Asaeli Hughes
Donal Lenihan	L	4	L	Koli Rakoroi
J. J. McCoy	P	3	P	Rusiate Namoro
Ciaran Fitzgerald (capt.)	H	2	H	Epeli Rakai
Phil Orr	P	1	P	Sairusi Naituku

23 October 1985

Ulster	23 - 9	Fiji XV
	report

Belfast
Referee: K. McCartney ( (Scotland) -SRU)

26 October 1985

Connacht	6 - 7	Fiji XV
	report

Galway
Referee: D.W. Mathews ( (England) -RFU)

30 October 1985

Newport	6 - 7	Fiji XV
	report

Newport
Referee: R. Jones ( (Wales) -WRU)

2 November 1985

London Welsh	9 - 22	Fiji XV
	report

London
Referee: Ken Rowlands ( (Wales) -WRU)

5 November 1985

Llanelli	31 - 28	Fiji XV
	report

Llanelli
Referee: L. Peard ( (Wales) -WRU)

9 November 1985

Wales	40 - 3	Fiji
	report

National Stadium, Cardiff
Referee: Stephen R Hilditch ( (Ireland) -IRFU)

Wales			Fiji
Paul Thorburn	FB	15	FB	Jimi Damu
Mark Titley	W	14	W	Mosese Nabati
Rob Ackerman	C	13	C	Sanivalati Laulau
Bleddyn Bowen	C	12	C	Tomasi Cama
Adrian Hadley	W	11	W	Serupepeli Tuvula
Jonathan Davies	FH	10	FH	Acura Niuqila
Terry Holmes (capt.)	SH	9	SH	Paula Nawalu
Phil Davies	N8	8	N8	Esala Teleni (capt.)
Dai Pickering	F	7	F	Peceli Gale
Mark Davies	F	6	F	Iokimi Finau
Bob Norster	L	5	L	Asaeli Hughes
John Perkins	L	4	L	Koli Rakoroi
Ian Eidman	P	3	P	Rusiate Namoro
Billy James	H	2	H	Epeli Rakai
Jeff Whitefoot	P	1	P	Peni Volavola
		Replacements
Ray Giles	SH	16	FB	Jone Kubu
