= 1989 Fiji rugby union tour of Europe =

Summary
P	W	D	L
Total
9	4	1	4
Test match
3	1	0	2
Opponent
P	W	D	L
Belgium
1	1	0	0
Scotland
1	0	0	1
England
1	0	0	1

The 1989 Fiji rugby union tour of Europe was a series of matches played in October–November 1989 in Europe by Fiji national rugby union team.

== Results ==
7 October 1989

Belgium	0 - 74	Fiji
	report

Visé

11 October 1989

France Selection	26 - 40	Fiji XV
	report

Nimes

14 October 1989

France Selection	18 - 15	Fiji XV
	report

Bergerac

18 October 1989

Cote Basque	25 - 25	Fiji XV
	report

Parc des Sports de Saint Léon, Bayonne

23 October 1989

French Barbarians	16 - 32	Fiji XV
	report

Bordeaux

27 October 1989

Glasgow	22 - 11	Fiji XV
	report

Glasgow

28 October 1989

Scotland	38 - 17	Fiji
Try: Gray, G.Hastings, Milne, Stanger 2 Tukalo; Con: G.Hastings 4 Pen: G.Hastings 2	report	Try: Lovo, Rasari; Pen: Koroduadua, Serevi 2

Murrayfield, Edinburgh
Referee: Patrick Robin ( (France) - F.F.R.)

Scotland			Fiji
Gavin Hastings	FB	15	FB	Severo Koroduadua
Tony Stanger	W	14	W	Tomasi Lovo
Scott Hastings	C	13	C	Luke Erenavula
Sean Lineen	C	12	C	Noa Nadruku
Iwan Tukalo	W	11	W	Isikeli Waqavatu
Craig Chalmers	FH	10	FH	Waisale Serevi
Gary Armstrong	SH	9	SH	Lekima Vasuvulagi
Derek White	N8	8	N8	Esala Teleni (capt.)
Graham Marshall	F	7	F	Alifereti Dere
John Jeffrey	F	6	F	Pita Naruma
Damian Cronin	L	5	L	Mesake Rasari
Chris Gray	L	4	L	Ilaitia Savai
Paul Burnell	P	3	P	Sairusi Naituku
Kenny Milne	H	2	H	Salacieli Naivilawasa
(capt.) David Sole	P	1	P	Mosese Taga
		Replacements
George Buchanan-Smith	F	16
		Coaches
(Scotland) Ian McGeechan				Samisoni Viriviri (Fiji)

2 November 1989

England B	12 - 20	Fiji XV
	report

Leeds

4 November 1989

England	58 - 23	Fiji
Try: Ackford, Bailey; Guscott, Linnett; Skinner, Underwood 5 Con: Andrew, Hodgkinson 5 Pen: Hodgkinson 2	report	Try: Erenavula, Rasari; Savai, Teleni; Con: Koroduadua 2 Pen: Koroduadua

Twickenham, London
Attendance: .000
Referee: Brian Stirling ( (Ireland) - IRFU)

England			Fiji
Simon Hodgkinson	FB	15	FB	Mosese Natuilagilagi
Rory Underwood	W	14	W	Tomasi Lovo
Jerry Guscott	C	13	C	Luke Erenavula
(capt.) Will Carling	C	12	C	Noa Nadruku (red card)
Mark Bailey	W	11	W	Tevita Vonolagi (red card)
Rob Andrew	FH	10	FH	Severo Koroduadua
Richard Hill	SH	9	SH	Lekima Vasuvulagi
David Egerton	N8	8	N8	Esala Teleni (capt.)
Peter Winterbottom	F	7	F	Alifereti Dere
Mickey Skinner	F	6	F	Nemani Matirewa
Paul Ackford	L	5	L	Mesake Rasari
Wade Dooley	L	4	L	Ilaitia Savai
Andy Mullins	P	3	P	Sairusi Naituku
Brian Moore	H	2	H	Salacieli Naivilawasa
Mark Linnett	P	1	P	Mosese Taga
		Replacements
Gary Rees	F	16
Simon Halliday	W	17
		Coaches
(England) Geoff Cooke				Samisoni Viriviri (Fiji)
