= 1984–85 FIRA Trophy =

European rugby union championship

1984-85 FIRA Trophy
- Date: 6 October 1984 – 12 October 1985
- Countries: France; Soviet Union; Italy; Romania; Tunisia; Spain

Tournament statistics
- Champions: France
- Grand Slam: France
- Matches played: 16

The 1984–85 FIRA Trophy was the 25th edition of a European rugby union championship for national teams.

The tournament was won by France, with a Grand Slam, finishing ahead of Soviet Union and Italy.

Romania could not make "Top 3" for very first time ever, due to inferior points difference in head-to-head games with Soviet Union and Italy.

As it was initially agreed, Division 1 would be shrunk to 5 teams for next edition. That's why Spain and Tunisia which finished as 5th and 6th, were relegated and replaced by Portugal which won the Second Division and got promoted.

Subsequently, at FIRA Annual Congress, held in mid-June, it was decided to continue with 6 teams, and the two relegated teams met for a barrage game at neutral venue to decide the survivor, with the Tunisians winning.

== First division ==
Place	Nation	Games				Points			Table points
Place	Nation	played	won	drawn	lost	for	against	difference	Table points
1	France	5	5	0	0	135	45	+90	15
2	Soviet Union	5	3	0	2	97	73	+24	11
3	Italy	5	3	0	2	70	60	+10	11
4	Romania	5	3	0	2	85	60	+25	11
5	Spain	5	1	0	4	64	119	-55	7
6	Tunisia	5	0	0	5	39	133	-94	5

Tie break for three teams—points difference in head-to-head games: SOV +7, ITA =0, ROM -7
Point system: try 4 pt, conversion: 2 pt., penalty kick 3 pt. drop 3 pt
Click "show" for more info about match (scorers, line-up etc)

6 October 1984

Tunisia	6 - 25	France XV

Tunis

20 October 1984

Tunisia	6 - 20	Italy

Monastir
Referee: (France) Doulcet

10 November 1984	Romania	3 - 18	France	Stadionul Dinamo, Bucharest
	Pen: Alexandru		Try: Lescarboura, Sella; Con: Lescarboura 2 Pen: Lescarboura 2	Attendance: 20,000; Referee: (Ireland) John West
Romania: 15.Laurentiu Codoi, 14.Adrian Lungu, 13.Gheorghie Varzaru, 12.Mihai Marghescu, 11.Marian Aldea, 10.Dumitru Alexandru, 9.Mircea Paraschiv (cap.), 8.Laurentiu Constantin, 7.Alexandru Radulescu, 6.Florica Murariu, 5.Gheorghie Caragea, 4.Gheorghie Dumitru, 3.Gheorghe Leonte, 2.Mircea Munteanu, 1.Ion Bucan - replacements: 16.Stefan Constantin				Attendance: 20,000; Referee: (Ireland) John West
France: 15.Serge Blanco, 14.Patrick Estève, 13.Philippe Sella, 12.Didier Codorniou, 11.Bernard Lavigne, 10.Jean-Patrick Lescarboura, 9.Jerome Gallion, 8.Dominique Erbani, 7.Laurent Rodriguez, 6.Jacques Gratton, 5.Jean Condom, 4.Francis Haget, 3.Jean-Pierre Garuet-Lempirou, 2.Philippe Dintrans (cap.), 1.Pierre Dospital

17 November 1984

Tunisia	15 - 17	Spain

Sfax
Attendance: 3,000

18 November 1984

Italy	13 - 12	Soviet Union
Try: Bettarello; Pen: Bettarello (3)		Try: Tikhonov; Con: Mironov; Pen: Mironov (2)

Stadio Tommaso Fattori, L'Aquila
Referee: (France) Matheu

16 December 1984

Spain	19 - 33	Romania
Try: Martín Fernández (2); Con: Nuñez Doval; Pen: Nuñez Doval (3)		Try: Radulescu, Toader, Florea, Morariu; Con: Alexandru (4); Pen: Alexandru (2); Drop: Alexandru (2)

Campo Universitario, Madrid
Attendance: 7,000
Referee: (France) G. Maurette

17 February 1985

France XV	34 - 6	Spain

Stade Jules Ribet, St Gaudens

3 March 1985

Italy	9 - 22	France A1
Pen: Bettarello (3)		Try: Cassagne, Lorieux, Sanz; Con: Rui (2); Pen: Rui; Drop: Rui

Stadio Comunale di Monigo, Treviso
Referee: (Scotland) A. M. Hosie

14 April 1985	Romania	7 - 6	Italy	Stadionul Municipal, Brasov
	Try: Toader; Pen: Ion		Pen: Bettarello (2)	Referee: (France) J.-P- Vedel
Romania: Ion Constantin, 14.Adrian Pllotschi, 13.Adrian Lungu, 12.Mihai Holban, 11.Marcel Toader, 10.Romeo Bezuscu, 9.Mircea Paraschiv, 8.Haralambie Dumitras, 7.M. Giucal, 6.Florica Murariu, 5.Laurentiu Constantin, 4.Gheorghie Dumitru, 3.Gheorghe Leonte, 2.Marin Mot, 1.D. Tunaru - replacements: Vasile Ion, S. Galan				Referee: (France) J.-P- Vedel
Italy: 15.Serafino Ghizzoni, 14.Massimo Mascioletti (cap.), 13.Luigi de Joanni, 12.Fabio Gaetaniello, 11.Andrea Azzali, 10.Stefano Bettarello, 9.Alessandro Ghini, 8.Gianni Zanon, 7.Marzio Innocenti, 6.Giuseppe Artuso, 5.Franco Berni, 4.Antonio Colella, 3.Guido Rossi, 2.Giorgio Morelli, 1.Renato de Bernardo - replacements: Stefano Barba, Giancarlo Pivetta

1 May 1985

Spain	9 - 15	Soviet Union
Pen: Nuñez Doval (3)		Try: Mironov, Hairulin; Con: Mironov (2); Pen: Mironov

Estadio de Chapina, Seville
Attendance: 3,500

5 May 1985

Romania	36 - 3	Tunisia
Try: Murariu, Hodorca, Toader, Constantin; Con: Nastase, Codoi; Pen: Nastase (2)		Pen: Bougaluri

Bârlad
Attendance: 10,000

12 May 1985

Soviet Union	35-9	Tunisia
Try: Malikov, Khairullin, Zuev, Igor Mironov; Con: Igor Mironov (2); Pen: Igor Mironov (5)

Kiev
Attendance: 5,000

16 May 1985

France XV	36 - 21	Soviet Union

Stade Alexandre Cueille, Tulle

18 May 1985

Italy	22 - 13	Spain
Try: Gaetaniello, Pivetta, Venturi, Vittadello; Con: Bettarello (3)		Try: Azkargota Aretxabala, de la Torre; Con: Nuñez Doval; Pen: Nuñez Doval

Stadio Danilo Martelli, Mantova
Referee: (Soviet Union) A. Grombinas

31 May 1985

Soviet Union	14 - 6	Romania
Try: Gonyani, Tikhonov; Pen: Mironov; Drop: Sljussar		Pen: Codoi; Drop: Codoi

Spartak Stadium, Kiev
Attendance: 3,000
Referee: (France) J.-C. Yché

Barrage per survival:

12 October 1985

Tunisia	12 - 9	Spain

Stade Paul-Bergere, Lavelanet

- Spain relegated to division 2

== Second division ==
Place	Nation	Games				Points			Table points
Place	Nation	played	won	drawn	lost	for	against	difference	Table points
1	Portugal	3	3	0	0	44	6	+38	9
2	Czechoslovakia	3	2	0	1	26	27	-1	7
3	Poland	3	1	0	2	31	24	+7	5
4	Morocco	3	0	0	3	18	62	-44	3

- Portugal promoted to division 1

13 October 1984

Czechoslovakia	4 - 3	Poland

Havířov

17 March 1985

Morocco	6 - 12	Portugal

Rabat

14 April 1985

Poland	28 - 6	Morocco

Sochaczew

18 April 1985

Portugal	18 - 0	Czechoslovakia
Try: Durão, Morais; Con: Queimado (2); Pen: Queimado; Drop: Queimado

Lisbon University Stadium, Lisbon
Attendance: 3,000

21 April 1985

Morocco	6 - 22	Czechoslovakia

Casablanca

28 April 1985

Portugal	14 - 0	Poland
Try: Durão, Ferreira, Morais; Con: Queimado

Lisbon University Stadium, Lisbon
Attendance: 500

== Third division ==
Place	Nation	Games				Points			Table points
Place	Nation	played	won	drawn	lost	for	against	difference	Table points
1	Netherlands	3	3	0	0	65	16	+49	9
2	Belgium	3	2	0	1	36	30	+6	7
3	West Germany	3	1	0	2	40	43	-3	5
4	Sweden	3	0	0	3	12	64	-52	3

14 October 1984

Netherlands	27-3	Sweden

Sportpark Berestein, Hilversum

16 October 1984

Belgium	19-3	Sweden

Brussels

4 November 1984

West Germany	10-23	Netherlands

Hanover

9 December 1984

Belgium	14-12	West Germany

Arlon

24 March 1985

Netherlands	15-3	Belgium

Sportpark Berestein, Hilversum

4 May 1985

Sweden	6-18	West Germany

Karlskrona

== Bibliography ==
- (in Italian) Francesco Volpe, Valerio Vecchiarelli (2000), 2000 Italia in Meta, Storia della nazionale italiana di rugby dagli albori al Sei Nazioni, GS Editore (2000) ISBN 88-87374-40-6.
- (in Italian) Francesco Volpe, Paolo Pacitti (Author), Rugby 2000, GTE Gruppo Editorale (1999).
- (in Georgian) ქართული რაგბის მატიანე (Georgian Rugby History) 1959-2009 ISBN 978-9941-0-2047-6 Free download
