= Pita Naruma =

Fijian rugby union player (born 1959)

- Born: 27 November 1959 Fiji
- Height: 6 ft 3 in (1.91 m)
- Weight: 217 lb (98 kg)
- Occupation: Policeman

Rugby union career
- Position: Flanker
Amateur team(s)
Years	Team	Apps	(Points)
- Daveta
Senior career
Years	Team	Apps	(Points)
- Police
1988-1991	Suva		
International career
Years	Team	Apps	(Points)
1988-1993	Fiji	15	(4)

Pita Naruma (born 27 November 1959) is a Fijian former rugby union player. He played as flanker.

== Career ==
He played for Suva in the Farebrother-Sullivan Trophy between 1988 and 1991, along the likes of Koli Rakoroi, Salacieli Naivilawasa, Ilikimi Torosi, Peni Rakai, Nemani Matirewa, Aisake Nadolo, Mosese Taga, Tomasi Cama, Pauliasi Tabulutu and Alifereti Dere. Naruma debuted in 1988 for Fiji during the match against Tonga, in Apia, on 31 May. He also was part of the 1991 Rugby World Cup roster, playing two matches in the tournament and scoring his only try in the tournament, in the match against Romania. His last cap with the Fiji national team was against Samoa, at Apia, on 5 June 1993. He also played for Fiji Sevens in the 1985, 1986 and 1988 Hong Kong Sevens tournaments., as well for the Fiji Barbarians.
