= Antonio Galeazzo =

Italy international rugby union player

- Born: 15 February 1959 (age 67) Padua, Italy

Rugby union career
- Position: Hooker
Senior career
Years	Team	Apps	(Points)
1981-1991	Petrarca Rugby		
International career
Years	Team	Apps	(Points)
1985-1987	Italy	5	(0)
Coaching career
- Years: Team
- 2010-: Padova 555

Antonio Galeazzo (born 15 February 1959 in Padua), is a former Italian rugby union player and currently, coach. He played as a hooker.

== Career ==
Along with Artuso, Farina and Gardin, from the scrum pack of Petrarca Rugby in the 1980s which prevailed several times domestically and supplied numerous players to Italy national team.

He debuted internationally at Mantua, in the 1984-85 FIRA Trophy against Spain; later, Galeazzo took part to the 1987 Rugby World Cup in Australia and New Zealand playing against Argentina.

He played his last international cap in November 1988 against USSR.

Since 2010, he coaches Padova 555, a Veneto regional Serie C team and since 2012, he returned to "his" Petrarca Rugby, coaching the youth teams of the famous Paduan team.

As of September 2015, he coaches the Rugby Piazzola ASD Junior U-12 team, which takes part to tournaments organised by the Regional Committee FIR Veneto.
