= Giorgio Morelli =

Italy international rugby union player

- Born: Giorgio Morelli; 18 April 1954 (age 72) L'Aquila, Italy

Rugby union career
- Position: Hooker
Senior career
Years	Team	Apps	(Points)
1972-1990	L'Aquila Rugby	339	(220)
International career
Years	Team	Apps	(Points)
1975-1988	Italy	26	(12)

Giorgio Morelli (born L'Aquila, 18 April 1954) is a former Italian rugby union player. He played as a hooker.

== Biography ==
Playing as hooker, he debuted in L'Aquila Rugby main team in 1972, winning the Coppa Italia; for years, along with fellow Italian internationals like Ghizzoni, Cucchiella and Mascioletti, and then, also Bottacchiari, Colella and Pietrosanti, he formed the base structure of the team which was capable of winning two times consecutively the scudetto in the early 1980s, reaching the top of the championship and of supplying numerous important players to the Italy national team.

At 18 years playing for L'Aquila, Morelli won two scudetti and a further Coppa Italia besides the previously cited one; he debuted in the Italy national team against France A1; he was not called up until seven years later, in 1982 for his second match (against the same opposing team). His first full international was in April 1982 against Romania.

He took part at the 1987 Rugby World Cup in Australia and New Zealand, ending his career against the All Blacks in Auckland, with the hooker Sean Fitzpatrick as his opponent in the first row.

Having a degree in engineering, Morelli ended his playing career in 1990. Often he attends events organised by his former club, L'Aquila Rugby, like the handing of the jerseys to the players before every match, entrusted to great names of the club's past.
