= Naituku =

Naituku is a Fijian surname. Notable people with this surname include:

- Epineri Naituku (1963–2019), Fijian rugby union player
- Sairusi Naituku (1961–2016), Fijian rugby union player
