= Rusiate Namoro =

Fijian rugby union footballer

- Born: circa 1966 (age 59–60) Naitasiri, Fiji
- Height: 6 ft 0 in (1.83 m)
- Weight: 215 lb (98 kg)
- Occupation: Farmer

Rugby union career
- Position(s): Prop, Hooker
Senior career
Years	Team	Apps	(Points)
- Naitasiri
–	Suva		
International career
Years	Team	Apps	(Points)
1982-1987	Fiji	22	(8)
Coaching career
- Years: Team
- 2004-2006: Fiji Sevens

Rusiate Namoro (born Naitasiri, circa 1966) is a Fijian former rugby union footballer, he played as a hooker or prop. Along with Koli Rakoroi, Elia Rokowailoa, Tom Mitchell, Epeli Naituivau and Setareki Tawake, he was one of the eight members of the country's armed forces to play for Fiji in a Rugby World Cup squad.

== Career ==
His first cap for Fiji was against Samoa, at Suva, on 21 August 1982. He also was called up for the 1987 Rugby World Cup roster, where he played 2 matches, where his last international cap was against the quarter-final against France, at Auckland.
