= Mauro Gardin =

Italy international rugby union player

- Born: 27 March 1961 (age 65) Padua, Italy

Rugby union career
- Position: Lock
Senior career
Years	Team	Apps	(Points)
1981-1988	Petrarca Rugby		
International career
Years	Team	Apps	(Points)
1981-1988	Italy	25	(4)

Mauro Gardin (born 27 March 1961, in Padua) is a former Italian rugby union player who played as lock.

Along with Artuso, Farina and Galeazzo in Petrarca's scrum which dominated the Italian rugby scenario in the 1980s (5 scudetti and 1 Coppa Italia), Gardin debuted in the national team in the 1981-82 FIRA Trophy, at Moscow, against Soviet Union (the final result was 12-12).

A very strong lock (almost two metres high), he took part to all the tournament editions until 1986, then, he took part to the 1987 Rugby World Cup playing all the three matches of the tournament.

He ended his international career a year later, against Romania.

Focusing on the technical career after retiring from the player career, in the 2008-09 season, Gardin is the scrum coach of Valsugana Rugby, a club from Padua, which plays in Serie B.
