= Raffaele Dolfato =

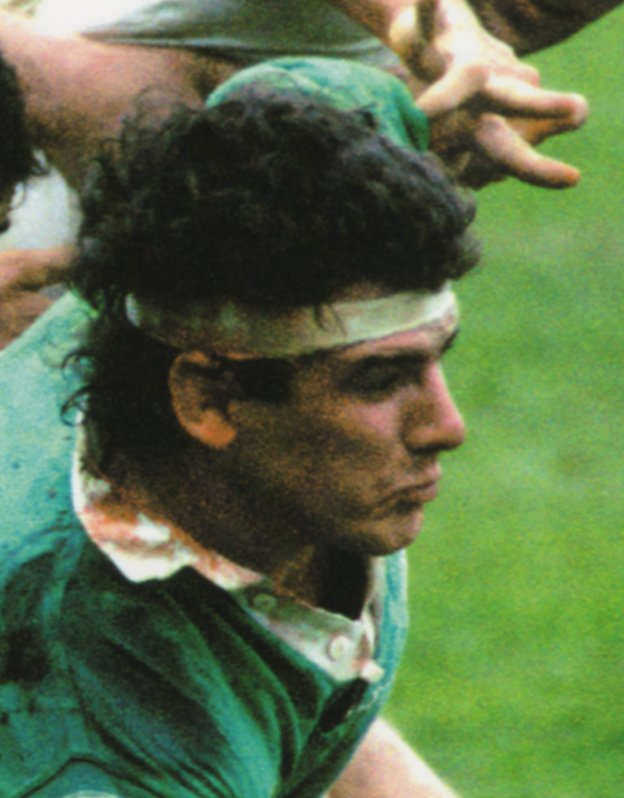
- Dolfato in a championship match against Petrarca, 1987
- Born: 28 October 1962 Treviso, Italy
- Died: 7 July 1997 (aged 34) San Biagio di Callalta, Treviso Province

Rugby union career
- Position: Flanker
Senior career
| Years | Team | Apps | (Points) |
| 1981-1994 | Benetton Treviso | 258 | ((?)) |
International career
| Years | Team | Apps | (Points) |
| 1985-1988 | Italy | 9 | (0) |

Raffaele Dolfato (Treviso, 28 October 1962-San Biagio di Callalta, Treviso Province, 7 July 1997) was an Italian rugby union player who played as flanker.

== Biography ==
A dashing flanker, thanks to his not extremely powerful body build type, he debuted in the championship with Benetton Treviso, with which he played for all of his career. He won three Italian Championship titles with Treviso, in 1981,1989, and 1992. He captained the team during the second, and in the third, he joined the try-scoring players hall of fame with a try scored against Rugby Rovigo.

== International career ==
He debuted for Italy on 3 March 1985 against a France XV, and he was among those who were called by the coach Marco Bollesan for the 1987 Rugby World Cup, the first ever Rugby World Cup. He played a total of 9 matches for the Italian team, the last of whose being against USSR in 1988.

== After career and death ==
After retiring from the playing career in 1994, Dolfato focused on the clothing company he founded, Dominae. On 7 July 1997 he was killed in a road incident on the Postumia Highway 53, Dolfato crashed head-on with a car, while driving a BMW R100 motorcycle, and died before medical aid arrived.
