= Pauliasi =

Pauliasi is a given name. Notable people with the name include:

- Pauliasi Manu (born 1987), New Zealand rugby union player
- Pauliasi Tabulutu (born 1967), Fijian rugby union player

== See also ==
- Pauliasi "Asi" Taulava (born 1973), Tongan-born Filipino basketball player
