= Tito Lupini =

Italy international rugby union player (1955–2021)

- Born: 12 October 1955 Johannesburg, South Africa
- Died: 23 July 2021 (aged 65) Johannesburg, South Africa

Rugby union career
- Position: Prop
Amateur team(s)
| Years | Team | Apps | (Points) |
| ???? | Transvaal | | |
Senior career
| Years | Team | Apps | (Points) |
| 1985–1992 | Rovigo | 123 | |
International career
| Years | Team | Apps | (Points) |
| 1987–1989 | Italy | 11 | (0) |
Coaching career
- Years: Team
- 1989–1993: Rovigo
- 2000–2006: Namibia (forwards coach)
- 2007–2010: Rovigo (forwards coach)

Tito Lupini (12 November 1955 – 23 July 2021) was a South African-born Italian rugby union player who played as a prop.

== Biography ==
Born and raised in South Africa by Italian parents, Lupini as a player represented the provincial team of Transvaal. After the appointment of former Springboks coach Nelie Smith for Rugby Rovigo, he moved to Italy in 1985 and played for Rovigo, in whose first row constituted a key element (also being Captain of the team) for the achievement of two national titles (1988 and 1990), alongside fellow south africans Naas Botha and Gert Smal. In the 1989–90 season, won by Rovigo, Lupini had the double role of player and coach. During his time in Italy, he helped Rovigo reaching the final twice (1989 and 1992), the semifinal (1991) and a quarter final (1993). The Smith-Lupini-Botha-Smal era is still fondly remembered in Rovigo, the most rugby addicted city in Italy, for the impact it had in ending a 9 years winning drought for the team.

His nephew is Roberto Lupini, the ex-professional golfer.

His cousins son Gino Lupini carried on his rugby legacy playing professionally for 8 seasons and representing Italy on 43 occasions. He is now an author and educator.

Lupini died from COVID-19-related complications on 23 July 2021. His mother died within 24 hours of him, also of the virus.

== International career ==
Debuting for the Italian national team in the 1985-87 FIRA Trophy against Romania at Constanţa, Socialist Republic of Romania, Lupini was called up by the then-coach Marco Bollesan in the roster which took part in the first edition of the Rugby World Cup, playing all the three matches where Italy played.

== Coaching career ==
After his retirement from the playing career in 1992, Lupini started his coaching career, coaching Rovigo, leading the team to the final for the national championship (then lost) against Benetton Treviso in 1992. He also coached the forwards for the Namibia national team and the same role for Rovigo.
