= Elia Rokowailoa =

- Born: Elia Rokowailoa; 22 July 1958 (age 68) Fiji
- Height: 6 ft 0 in (1.83 m)
- Weight: 210 lb (95 kg)

Rugby union career
- Position: Fly-half
Senior career
Years	Team	Apps	(Points)
1982-1993	Army Rugby Union, Suva		
International career
Years	Team	Apps	(Points)
1982-1994	Fiji	17	(66)

Elia Rokowailoa, known also as Willie Rokowailoa (born 22 July 1958) is a former Fijian dual-code rugby player. He played as fly-half. He was also a soldier.

== Career ==
His first cap for the Fiji was against Samoa, at Apia, on 12 June 1982. He was also part of the 1987 Rugby World Cup squad, where he played three matches. He still played in the national team, although not being called in the 1991 Rugby World Cup Fijian squad. His last international cap was against Tonga, at Nuku'alofa, on 17 July 1993. Along with Mosese Taga, Salacieli Naivilawasa, Usaia Daunivalu, Lai Tawake, Alifereti Dere, Nemani Matirewa, Esala Teleni, Pauliasi Tabulutu, and Fotu Waqabaca, Rokowailoa was also a member of the Suva team that won the coveted Farebrother-Sullivan Trophy from Nadi in 1988.
