= Schiavio =

Schiavio is a surname. Notable people with the surname include:

- Alejandro Schiavio (born 1961), Argentine rugby union player
- Angelo Schiavio (1905–1990), Italian footballer
