= Faggi =

Faggi is a surname of Italian origin. Notable people with the surname include:

- Antonella Faggi (born 1961), Italian politician
- Franco Faggi (1926-2016), Italian rower
- Marcelo Faggi (born 1964), Argentine rugby player
