= Tevita Vonolagi =

Fijian rugby union footballer (born 1963)

- Born: November 29, 1963 (age 62) Fiji
- Height: 5 ft 10 in (178 cm)
- Weight: 178 lb (81 kg)

Rugby union career
- Position: Wing
Senior career
Years	Team	Apps	(Points)
1988-1993	Army Rugby Club, Suva		
International career
Years	Team	Apps	(Points)
1988-1993	Fiji	16	(42)

Tevita Vonolagi (born 29 November 1963) is a Fijian former rugby union footballer, he played as wing.

== Career ==
At club level, he played for the Fijian Armed Forces team and for the Suva District team. He debuted for Fiji during a test match against Tonga, in Nadi, on 8 October 1988. As a player, Vonolagi was known for his extremely tough and dangerous spot tackles, which made him feared. In 1989 he took part at the Fiji tour to Europe. In the game on 4 November 1989 against the England at the Twickenham Stadium, in which the Fijians lost 23-58, he scored on the side and got sent off in the 52nd minute by the referee Brian Sterling due to a late tackle on Jeremy Guscott. Four minutes later, Noa Nadruku was sent off for a rough tackle on Will Carling and the Fijian coach criticised the referee's decisions. The Daily Express described the Fijian game as "mugging the English on the mud", arguing that the Fijians eventually dragged themselves in the mud, and the referee could not limit himself to sending off both players. According to former Fiji international Sairusi Naituku, the referee's decisions costed the match to the Fijians, who, after the half-time, were under a margin of 20-13. He was also part of the 1991 Rugby World Cup squad, where he played the only match against Romania. His last international cap was against Tonga, in Nuku'alofa, on 17 July 1993, won by 15-10. He scored 42 points in 16 games, with 7 tries, 2 penalties and 2 drop goals. In 2002, he ended his career for the Australian rugby league team Camden Rams.

== Personal life ==
He resides in Perth.
