= Stefano Romagnoli =

Italy international rugby union player

- Born: 5 February 1955 (age 71) Bologna, Italy

Rugby union career
- Position: Prop
Senior career
Years	Team	Apps	(Points)
1971-1973	Rugby Bologna 1928		
1973-1975	Fiamme Oro		
1975-1987	Parma		
1987-1990	Bologna		
1990-1991	Noceto		
International career
Years	Team	Apps	(Points)
1982-1987	Italy	15	(0)
Coaching career
- Years: Team
- 1989-1990: Italy U-19
- 1991-1997: Bologna
- 1995-1999: Italy U-21
- 1998-2004: GRAN Parma
- 1999-2002: Italy A
- 2004-2006: Viadana
- 2006-2008: Italy U-19
- 2008-2010: Italy U-20
- 2010-2011: Italy U-18

Stefano Romagnoli (born Bologna, 5 February 1955) is a former Italian rugby union player and current coach. He played as a prop.

== Career ==
Born and grown in the Emilian capital. Bologna, He debuted at 16 years with Bologna in 1971; then, he moved to Fiamme Oro -the Italian police sports group- in 1973, where he stayed for two years, during which he represented Italy at youth level; moving to Parma in 1975, he was called up in Italy A and, in 1982, in the Italian national team, debuting in the 1982-83 FIRA Trophy against Morocco.

Called up also for the later FIRA Trophies, he played his last international match during the 1987 Rugby World Cup in Australia and New Zealand, against Fiji. In the same year, he also returned to play for Bologna for 3 seasons, before retiring in 1991 playing for Noceto. At the time, he was the then-coach of Italy under-19 national team.

Since 1991 he led, in parallel with his federal appointment, the Bologna team until 1997, in the last years along with Mario Pavin; in 1998 he was appointed coach of Amatori Parma, which in the following year, after the merger with Noceto's senior team, became GRAN Parma; in the new team, Romagnoli stayed until 1994; later he coached Viadana, from which he was however dismissed in February 2006, due to internal disagreements.

Since 2008, along with Alessandro Ghini, he coaches Italy under-20 national team, and he is the Technical manager of the Ivan Francescato Federal Rugby Academy.
