= Jioji =

Jioji is a Fijian masculine given name. Notable people with the name include:

- Jioji Cama, Fijian rugby union footballer
- Jioji Konrote (born 1947), Fijian politician and Major-General
- Jioji Kotobalavu, Fijian civil servant
- Jioji Vatubua, Fijian rugby footballer

== See also ==
- Joji Banuve, Fijian politician
- Ratu Joji (George Cakobau Jr.), Fijian chief and senator
