= Daniele Tebaldi =

- Born: 24 April 1961 (age 65) Parma, Italy

Rugby union career
- Position: Fullback
Senior career
Years	Team	Apps	(Points)
-	Noceto		
–	Rugby Parma F.C. 1931		
International career
Years	Team	Apps	(Points)
1985–1991	Italy	15	(7)
Coaching career
- Years: Team
- 1999-03: Castel San Pietro
- 2002-03: Italy U18
- 2003-05: Italy U19
- 2005-: Reggio Emilia
- 2015-: Italy U18
- –: Rugby Parma F.C. 1931 (youth team)

Daniele Tebaldi (born 24 April 1961 in Parma) is a former Italian rugby union player and a current coach. He played as a fullback.

Tebaldi played for Rugby Noceto and Rugby Parma F.C. 1931 in the National Championship of Excellence in Italy.

He had 15 caps for Italy, from 1985 to 1991, scoring a try and a drop goal, seven points on aggregate. He was called for the 1987 Rugby World Cup, playing in two games, and for the 1991 Rugby World Cup, but this time he did not play. He remained scoreless in his only playing presence at the competition.

Tebaldi has been the coach of Castel San Pietro, from 1999/2000 to 2002/03, Italy U-18 national team (2002/03), Italy U-19 national team (2003–2005), Rugby Reggio (2003/04-2004/05), and Italy U-18 national team, once again. In 2005, he joined Rugby Parma as director of the youth sector, becoming afterwards technical director.
