= Marcelo Faggi =

Argentina international rugby union player

- Born: Marcelo Faggi; October 13, 1964 (age 62) Paraná, Entre Ríos Province

Rugby union career
- Position: Scrum-half
Senior career
Years	Team	Apps	(Points)
1985-1994	Estudiantes de Paraná		
1994-1995	Rugby Lyons Piacenza		
International career
Years	Team	Apps	(Points)
1987	Argentina	0	(0)

Marcelo Faggi (born 13 October 1964 in Entre Ríos Province) played as scrumhalf.

== Career ==
He mainly played his career for Estudiantes de Paraná, where he played until 1994, when he moved to Italy to play for Rugby Lyons Piacenza. He also was called for the 1987 Rugby World Cup to play for Argentina as a replacement for Martín Yangüela, who was injured before the match against New Zealand, but never saw action. Currently, Faggi coaches Entre Ríos provincial sevens team.
