= Crociati Parma Rugby FC =

Italian rugby union club, based in Parma

(Italy) Crociati Parma Rugby FC
- Full name: Banca Monte Crociati Rugby Football Club
- Union: Federazione Italiana Rugby
- Founded: 2010
- Disbanded: 2014
- Location: Parma, Italy
- Ground(s): Stadio Sergio Lanfranchi (Capacity: 3,500)
- League(s): n/a
- 2012–13: 11th (Excellence)
1st kit	2nd kit

Former logo of Rugby Parma F.C.

Crociati Parma Rugby F.C. are an Italian rugby union club. They are based in Parma in Emilia-Romagna. They were founded in 2010 by the merger of Rugby Parma F.C. (Overmach Parma) and F.C. Rugby Noceto and disbanded in 2014.

== Rugby Parma ==
Rugby Parma was founded in 1931 by Gianni Penzi, Mario Pirazzoli and Peter Zini. In the following years the university organized friendly games, then began official competitions. In 1935 Parma joined the Italian first division. As a result of a break with the university in 1946, Rugby Parma was founded.

In the fifties Parma won three Italian championships (1949–50, 1954–55 and 1956–57). In the sixties they won two youth championships (1961–62 and 1966–67). In 1973–74 and 1987–88 the team were relegated only to return immediately to the top flight. From the 1993–94 to 1997–98 they played in Seria A2. In 1998–99 they were back in Seria A (renamed Super 10, now Top12).

On 2 June 2006, Parma defeated Newport Gwent Dragons of Wales 24-15 in the Heineken Cup 24th Place Play-off at Rodney Parade to claim the 24th and final spot in the 2006–07 Heineken Cup. In doing so they became the first Italian team to win the end of season Heineken Cup play-off (a match regularly contested between teams from the Celtic League and the Italian National Championship of Excellence), and ensured Italy would have three entrants in the competition, equal with Wales and Ireland, and one more than Scotland.

== Crociati Rugby FC ==
Crociati Rugby FC were formed in June 2010 by the merger of Overmach Rugby Parma FC and Noceto Rugby FC. The club ran a senior team that competed in the National Championship of Excellence and an under-20s team. They will be based at Stadio XX Aprile, Moletolo, Parma. In 2010/2011 the new club also competed in the Amlin Challenge Cup.

Each merging club maintained independent youth sections up to Under-20 level. The merger was made necessary by the formation of Aironi to compete in the Celtic League from 2010/2011. Both clubs were shareholders in Aironi. With the best players and sponsorship now being concentrated in Aironi the clubs could not financially field individual professional rugby teams.

Aironi struggled in the two season in the Magners League ran into financial difficulties and were replaced by Zebre.

== Parma rugby honours ==
- National Championship of Excellence:
  - Champions: 1950, 1955, 1957
- Coppa Italia:
  - Champions: 2005-06, 2007–08, 2008–09
- Italian Super Cup:
  - Champions (1)

== Notable former players ==
- Miguel Ruiz (Argentina)
- Alvaro Tejeda (Argentina)
- Federico Todeschini (Argentina)
- Tomás Vallejos (Argentina)
- Michael Barbieri (Canada)
- Luke Tait (Canada)
- Sireli Bobo (Fiji)
- Wame Lewaravu (Fiji)
- Maikeli Sego (Fiji)
- Robert Barbieri (Italy)
- Cristian Bezzi (Italy)
- Aldo Birchall (Italy)
- Carlo Del Fava (Italy)
- Alberto De Marchi (Italy)
- Roland de Marigny (Italy)
- Simone Favaro (Italy)
- Fabio Gaetaniello (Italy)
- Ezio Galon (Italy)
- Davide Giazzon (Italy)
- Alessandro Ghini (Italy)
- Sergio Lanfranchi (Italy)
- Francesco Mazzariol (Italy)
- Nicola Mazzucato (Italy)
- Francesco Minto (Italy)
- Tino Paoletti (Italy)
- Gilberto Pavan (Italy)
- Gert Peens (Italy)
- Corrado Pilat (Italy)
- Roberto Quartaroli (Italy)
- Stefano Romagnoli (Italy)
- Stefano Saviozzi (Italy)
- Fabio Staibano (Italy)
- Daniele Tebaldi (Italy)
- Pietro Travagli (Italy)
- Manoa Vosawai (Italy)
- Daniel Bowden (New Zealand)
- Leo Lafaiali'i (Samoa)
- Silao Leaega (Samoa)
- Pelu Taele (Samoa)
- Alesana Tuilagi (Samoa)
- Henry Tuilagi (Samoa)
- Paul Emerick (USA)
- Albert Tuipulotu (USA)

== Statistics ==
=== European Challenge Cup ===
Season	Played	Won	Drawn	Lost	For	Against
2000–01	6	0	0	6	92	262
2001–02	5	2	0	3	127	162
(Shield) 2002–03	4	2	0	2	88	90
2002–03	2	0	0	2	24	82
(Shield) 2003–04	6	3	0	3	150	128
2003–04	2	0	0	2	34	58
2004–05	4	2	0	2	73	116
2005–06	6	1	0	5	74	206
2007–08	6	1	0	5	104	157
2008–09	6	3	0	3	165	120
2009–10	6	2	0	4	78	145
2010–11	4	0	0	4	37	178

=== Heineken Cup ===
Season	Played	Won	Drawn	Lost	For	Against
2006–07	6	1	0	5	79	271
