= Albert Anderson (rugby union) =

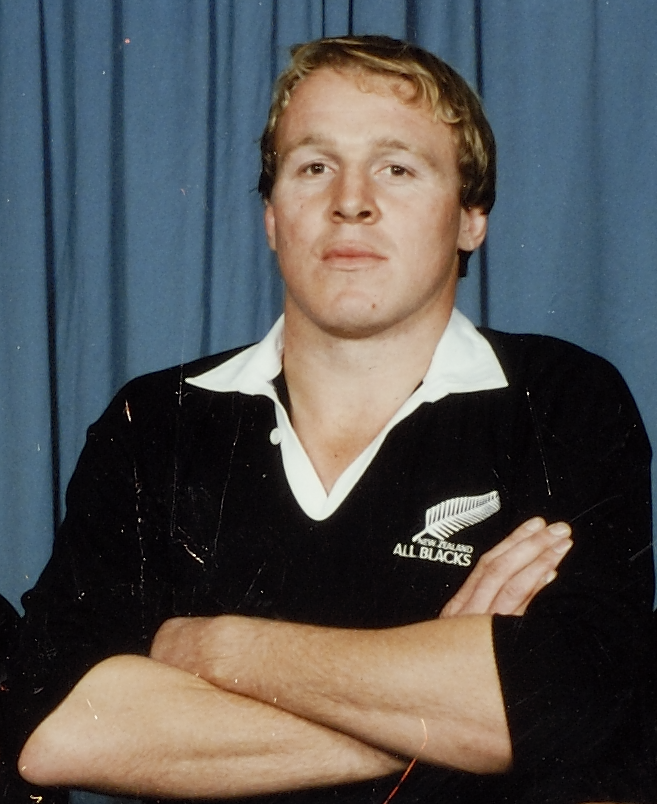
- Anderson in 1987
- Born: 5 February 1961 (age 65) Christchurch, New Zealand
- Height: 1.97 m (6 ft 6 in)
- Weight: 111 kg (245 lb)
- School: St. Andrew's College, Christchurch

Rugby union career
- Position: Lock
Provincial / State sides
Years	Team	Apps	(Points)
1981−90	Canterbury	143	
International career
Years	Team	Apps	(Points)
1983–88	New Zealand	6	(0)

Albert Anderson (born 5 February 1961) is a former New Zealand rugby union player. A lock, Anderson represented Canterbury at a provincial level, and was a member of the New Zealand national side, the All Blacks, between 1983 and 1988. He played 25 matches for the All Blacks including six internationals. He was a member of the victorious New Zealand squad at the 1987 Rugby World Cup, and captained the side in four matches on the 1988 tour of Australia. Played for Sudbury RFC in Suffolk, U.K.
