= Gino Lupini =

Cavaliere Ufficiale Gino Lupini OSML SMOCG OOMS KDO OSMW ME.d
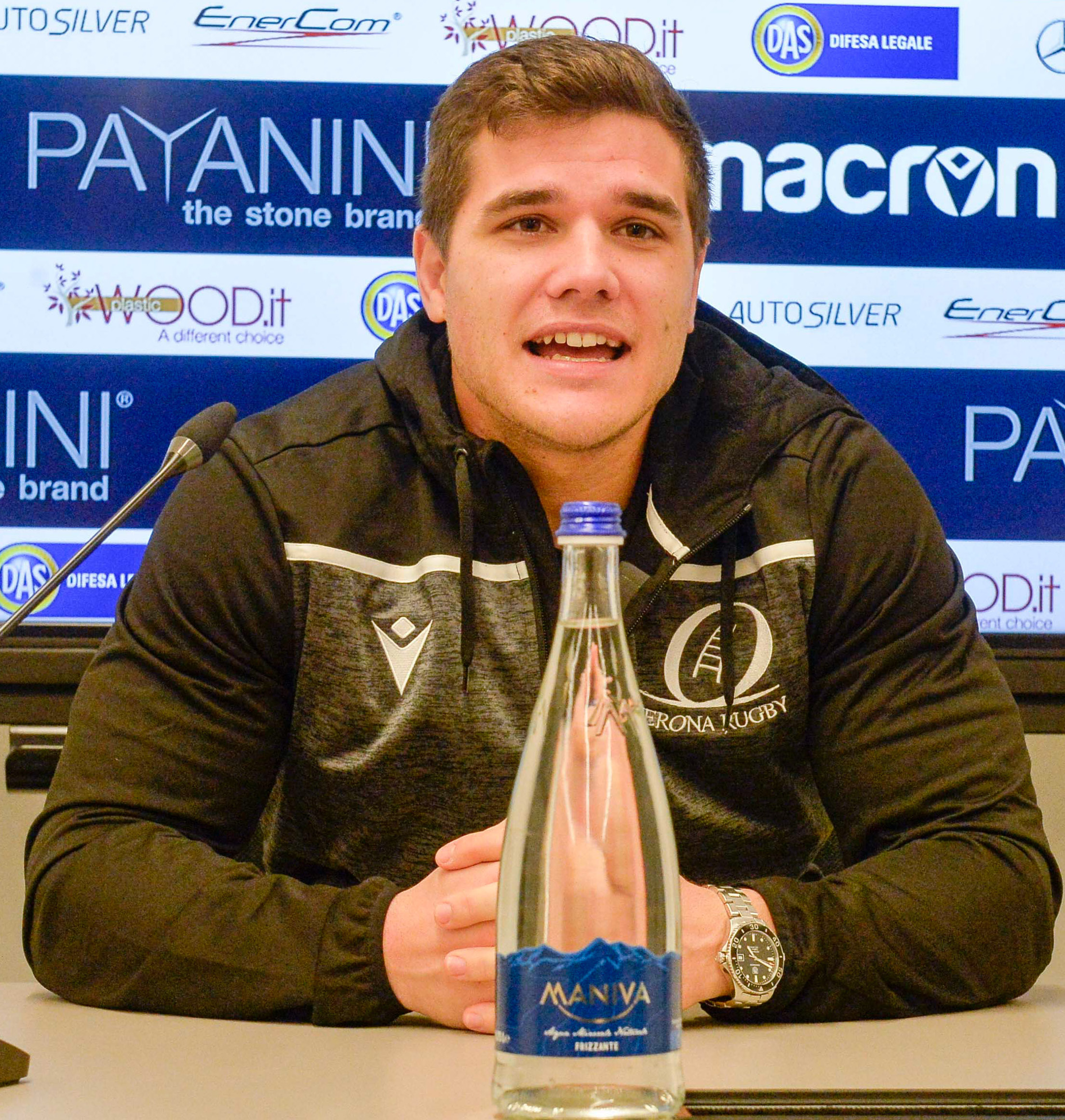
- Full name: Gino Neil Lupini
- Born: 15 August 1994 (age 32) Cape Town, South Africa
- Height: 1.80 m (5 ft 11 in)
- Weight: 92 kg (14 st 7 lb; 203 lb)
- School: SACS : 2008-2012
- University: UNISA, University of Nottingham
- Notable relative(s): Tito Lupini, Lupi (famiglia)
- Occupation(s): Education and Author

Rugby union career
- Position: Centre
Youth career
- 2014-2015: Western Province
Senior career
Years	Team	Apps	(Points)
2015-2016	Rugby Mogliano	9	(?)
2016-2018	San Donà	27	(10)
2018-2019	I Medicei	21	(20)
2019-2020	Verona Rugby	12 (Season interrupted due to Covid-19)	(45)
International career
Years	Team	Apps	(Points)
2015-2020	Italy Sevens	43 apps, 10 Int. Tourn.	(65)
- Correct as of 10 April 2019

Gino Neil Lupini is a retired South African-Italian professional rugby union player, educator and author. He played in the top domestic Italian league Top10 and for Italy Sevens in 10 competitions, making 43 match appearances.

== Rugby ==
After having two very successful years in the first 15 at South African College Schools (2011-2012), he was selected to join the Italian under 20 squad ahead of the 2013 IRB Junior World Rugby Trophy (Did not take part due to injury).

=== Western Province ===
In 2014, he joined the Western Province Rugby Academy, he was fortunate enough to later be added to the u21 Western Province (rugby team) who went on to win the u21 Currie Cup. Gino stayed with the u21 squad at Western Province (rugby team) in 2015 who once again went on to win the u21 Currie Cup.

=== Mogliano Rugby ===
In 2015, he left Western Province (rugby team) to join Mogliano Rugby in Italy, ahead of the Italian pre-season training. Here he would go on to play his debut season in the National Championship of Excellence and the European Challenge Cup qualifier.

=== San Dona Rugby ===
In 2016, he started at the international level, playing for Italian Rugby Federation in the form of rugby sevens where he burst onto the Rugby Europe scene in the 2016 FIRA Grand prix sevens series. He also joined up with his new 15 man club; Rugby San Dona to play in the National Championship of Excellence. In 2017, Gino Lupini has continued to be form with Italian Rugby Federation, Italy Seven gaining two player of the tournament trophies in the two international tournaments in which he played. He has continued playing the 15 man format of the game with his chosen club Rugby San Dona.

== Retirement from rugby ==
During the COVID-19 pandemic crisis 2020, Lupini announced his retirement with immediate effect. He had suffered a number of concussions throughout his playing career, he announced his retirement on his social media accounts and with an Italian rugby journalist from ONRUGBY.IT. He stated, "Strange to think I am writing this at 26, but after a few months of contemplating and not due to lack of opportunity I am lucky enough to blow final whistle on my playing career, both literally and figuratively hanging up my boots. I feel that it is best for me to focus on my future. I feel so grateful and thankful that I have had the chance to turn my childhood dream into a reality and I can only hope that it be considered a success. I was fortunate enough to be with so many amazing teams, have such successful teammates and most importantly, made friendships that will last a lifetime. I couldn't have chased my childhood dream without the support from family and friends, thank you all for being there for me, no one could have asked for more."

== Author ==
In 2025, he wrote a historical book titled, The Royal House of Savoy: Unifers of Italy. The book's foreword was written by Emanuele Filiberto of Savoy, Prince of Venice, the de jure King of Italy. The conclusion of the book was written by the first female heir of the family, Princess Vittoria of Savoy. According to the blurb, the book focuses on 1000 year history of House of Savoy and their role in unifying Italy. The blurbs from the cover come from a number of notable names such as: Prince Dimitri of Yugoslavia, Prince Charles-Henri de Lobkowicz, Professor Neil Kent and The Royal Watcher. The book was published by Academica Press and released in March 2026.

== Honours ==
- Rugby Eccellenza (became Top10 (rugby union), 4th in Classification 2015-2016
- Coppa Italia, Winner 2017
- Rugby Europe Sevens, Bronze medalist, Russia, 2018
- Elected Best Center in Eccellenza, 2018

== National honours and Dynastic orders ==
- Italy: Knight of Merit of the Sacred Military Constantinian Order of Saint George
- (Kingdom of Italy) House of Savoy: Knight of the Order of Saints Maurice and Lazarus
- (Kingdom of Italy) House of Savoy: Knight Officer of Merit of the Civil Order of Savoy
- Petrović-Njegoš dynasty: Knight of the Order of Prince Danilo I
- House of Braganza: Knight of the Order of Saint Michael of the Wing
