= Marzio Innocenti =

Italy international rugby union player

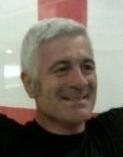
- Born: 4 September 1958 (age 68) Livorno, Italy
- Occupation(s): Rugby coach Otorhinolaryngologist

Rugby union career
- Position(s): Flanker, number 8
Senior career
Years	Team	Apps	(Points)
1977-1982	Livorno		
1982-1988	Petrarca Padova		
International career
Years	Team	Apps	(Points)
1981-1988	Italy	42	(8)
Coaching career
- Years: Team
- 1991-1997: CUS Padova Rugby
- 2005-2008: Valsugana Rugby
- 2008-2009: Rugby Riviera
- 2009: Casino di Venezia
- 2009-: Rugby Riviera

Marzio Innocenti (born 4 September 1958, in Livorno) is a former Italian rugby union player and coach and current sports director. He played as a flanker and a number 8. Since 21 March 2021 he's the president of the Italian rugby federation. He works as physician.

== Playing career ==
He grew up playing for Livorno but spent most of his career in Padua playing for Petrarca, team with which he won four league titles (the last one as the captain of the side).

He made his international debut for Italy in 1981 in the FIRA Trophy (a predecessor of the present-day European Nations Cup) in a 23–0 win against Western Germany proceeding to win a total of 42 caps (20 as a captain) until his international retirement in 1988. He was the captain of Italy in the 1987 World Cup in which he played all the three games and scored one of his two international tries.

== Coaching career ==
After his retirement and after having obtained a degree in medicine at the Padua University and started a practice as an otorhinolaryngologist, Innocenti started his coaching career by being part of Bertrand Fourcade's staff at the 1991 Rugby World Cup and at the same time being in charge of the Italian "A" team alongside Massimo Mascioletti and Stefano Romagnoli. In 1991, after the World Cup, he took charge of CUS Padova, that he led until 1996 when the club, after having won its third promotion under Innocenti's guide, was admitted for the first and only time in its history to Serie A1 (now Top12), the highest tier of Italian rugby.

During his tenure, Innocenti unearthed such talents as internationals Nicola Mazzucato and Gianluca Faliva.

In 1996 he left the coaching role to become the club's Director of Rugby.

In 2000 he was elected to the board of the Federazione Italiana Rugby (FIR), role in which he was confirmed in 2004 after having been defeated by Giancarlo Dondi in his bid for presidency of the same organization.

In 2005 Innocenti accepted to return to coaching for Valsugana Rugby, in Padua, leading the club to an immediate promotion. In 2008 he took charge of Rugby Riviera, in Mira, also being promoted at the first attempt to Serie A, the national second-tier league.

In 2009 Marzio Innocenti made his debut as a first division coach with Casino di Venezia. The team, though, didn't perform as expected, and Innocenti was sacked at the end of October. In November he was re-hired by Rugby Riviera.
