= Luis Molina (rugby union) =

Argentine rugby union player (born 1959)

- Born: Luis Enrique Molina; 3 November 1959 (age 67) San Miguel de Tucumán, Argentina

Rugby union career
- Position: Prop
Senior career
Years	Team	Apps	(Points)
1978-1982	Tucumán Lawn Tennis Club		
1982-1991	Los Tarcos Rugby Club		
International career
Years	Team	Apps	(Points)
1985-1991	Argentina	12	(0)

Luis Enrique Molina (born San Miguel de Tucumán, 3 November 1959) is a former Argentine rugby union player. He played as a prop.

He first played for Tucumán Lawn Tennis Club, where he won four titles of the Argentine First Division, from 1978 to 1982. He later would play for Los Tarcos Rugby Club.

Molina had 12 caps for Argentina, from 1985 to 1991, without ever scoring. He won three times the South American Rugby Championship in 1985, 1987 and 1989. He was called for the 1987 Rugby World Cup, playing in all the three games but without scoring. He was called once again for the 1991 Rugby World Cup, playing in one game, without scoring, as Argentina would be eliminated in the 1st round.
