= Peni Volavola (rugby union) =

Fijian rugby union footballer (born 1963)

- Born: 6 June 1963 (age 63) Fiji
- Height: 6 ft 0 in (1.83 m)
- Weight: 235 lb (107 kg)

Rugby union career
- Position: Prop
19??-?? 1986-91	Teachers-Norths; Brothers Old Boys		
Provincial / State sides
Years	Team	Apps	(Points)
1986-1991	Queensland		
International career
Years	Team	Apps	(Points)
1985-1991	Fiji	11	(0)

Peni Volavola (born 6 June 1963) is a Fijian former rugby union footballer, he played as prop.

== Career ==
His first cap was against Wales, at Cardiff, on 6 November 1985. He was part of the 1987 and 1991 World Cup rosters, playing 4 matches. He was not anymore called in the national team after the pool match against Romania, at Brive-la-Gaillarde, on 12 October 1991.

== Club career ==
Between 1982 and 1986, he played for Nadi, where he played alongside Vilikesa Vatiwaliwali, Iokimi Finau, Peceli Gale, Bruce Naulago, Belasio Vukiwai, Asaeli Hughes, Ilaitia Savai, Maika Toga, Samisoni Viriviri, Ilai Korotamana, Esala Labalaba, Savenaca Aria, Sanivalati Laulau, Manasa Qoro and Epeli Turuva and won the Farebrother Trophy. He also played for Queensland.
