= Alifereti Dere =

Fijian rugby union player and coach (1961–2026)

- Born: Alifereti Dere Ratu; 29 September 1961 Colony of Fiji
- Died: February 2026 (aged 64)
- Height: 6 ft 1 in (1.85 m)
- Weight: 198 lb (90 kg)
- Occupation: Private in the Fijian Armed Forces

Rugby union career
- Position: Flanker
Senior career
Years	Team	Apps	(Points)
1988–1991	Army Rugby Club, Suva		
International career
Years	Team	Apps	(Points)
1986–1991	Fiji	37	(220)
Coaching career
- Years: Team
- 2010–2013: Fiji Sevens

Alifereti Dere (29 September 1961 – February 2026) was a Fijian rugby union footballer and coach. He played as a flanker. Along with fellow Fijian rugby players Mesake Rasari, Niko Baleiverata, Fili Seru, Kinivuwai Ratuvio, Pita Naruma, Etuate Gusuivalu, Manasa Bari, Marika Vunibaka and Pauliasi Tabulutu, he gained widespread success in the sport of rugby. He played also for the Army Rugby Club, from Suva.

== Career ==
Dere's first international cap was against Wales, at Suva, on 31 March 1986. He did not take part in the 1987 Rugby World Cup, having departed the previous year, for a tour of duty with Fiji troops in the United Nations' interim force in Lebanon. He was also part of the 1991 Rugby World Cup roster, where he played three matches. His last cap was during the World Cup pool match against Romania, at Brive-la-Gaillarde. He also captained Fiji Sevens in the 1990s.

== Coaching career ==
In November 2011 Dere was named as head coach of the Fiji national rugby sevens team, replacing Joe Savou. In 2011, his assistant coach Eluati Waqa replaced him as head coach during the Gold Coast sevens, as Dere was barred to enter in Australia due to his military background.

== Death ==
Dere died in February 2026, at the age of 64.
