= Livai Kididromo =

Fijian rugby union footballer,

- Born: c. 1959 Fiji
- Height: 6 ft 2 in (1.88 m)
- Weight: 198 lb (90 kg)

Rugby union career
- Position: Flanker
Senior career
Years	Team	Apps	(Points)
19??-19??	Suva		
International career
Years	Team	Apps	(Points)
1987–1988	Fiji	4	(0)

Livai Kididromo (born c. 1959) is a Fijian former rugby union footballer, he played as a flanker. He was one of the Fiji players who took part in the 1987 Rugby World Cup.

== Career ==
His first international cap was during the 1987 Rugby World Cup pool match against New Zealand national rugby union team at Christchurch on 27 May 1987. He played two matches during the tournament. His last cap for Fiji was during the match against Tonga at Nuku'alofa on 2 July 1988.
