= Marthinus Grobler =

- Born: 1967 (age 58–59) South Rhodesia

Rugby union career
- Position: Fly-half
Amateur team(s)
Years	Team	Apps	(Points)
198?-1994	Birmingham Moseley Rugby Club		
International career
Years	Team	Apps	(Points)
1987-1994	Zimbabwe	3	(4)

Marthinus Grobler (born c. 1967), is a Zimbabwean rugby union player who played as fly-half.

== Career ==
At club level, Grobler played for Birmingham Moseley. He also represented Zimbabwe at the 1987 Rugby World Cup, being first capped in the pool stage match against Scotland. In the tournament, he scored 7 penalties and converted 2 tries, with 25 points in aggregate. His last cap was during the test match against Ivory Coast in Casablanca on 18 June 1994, earning 7 caps and 25 points in his overall career.
