= Sergio Zorzi =

Italy international rugby union player

- Born: 21 April 1964 (age 62) Treviso, Italy

Rugby union career
- Position: Centre
Senior career
Years	Team	Apps	(Points)
-	Tarvisium		
-1992	Benetton Treviso		
International career
Years	Team	Apps	(Points)
1985-1992	Italy	7	(0)
Coaching career
- Years: Team
- 2003-06: Mirano
- 2006-: Benetton Treviso
- 2006-09: Italy U-18
- 2009-10: Benetton Treviso
- 2010-14: Villorba

Sergio Zorzi (born 21 April 1964 in Treviso), is a former Italian rugby union player and currently, coach. He played as a centre.

== Biography ==
Hailing from Treviso Province, Zorzi made his first steps into rugby playing for Tarvisium, the historical feeder club of international players for the greater clubs like the Francescato brothers (Ivan, Nello and Rino) and Gianni Zanon.

From there, like every player who played for that club, the move to Benetton was brief; in the green and white club, Zorzi showed his talent until being called for the national team.

Debuting in 1985, in the FIRA Trophy against Romania, Zorzi took part in the 1987 Rugby World Cup, in Australia and New Zealand, although not being present in the starting fifteen due to an injury; His last match for Italy was in 1992, also, against Romania.

As coach, he coached Mirano Rugby, Rugby Mogliano, Silea Rugby (with consequent promotion in Serie A). Between 2006 and 2010, he coached the Italy national under-18 rugby union team and the Benetton Treviso under-19 youth team. He won the Under-21 title with Benetton Rugby, Zorzi was also Technical Director for San Donà Rugby, skills coach for Benetton seniors team in 2008 and currently, he is the technical director for Akka Formazione and Skills Coach for Mogliano Rugby.
