= Mario Pavin =

- Born: Mario Pavin; 18 July 1958 (age 68) Treviso, Italy
- Height: 185 m (606 ft 11 in)
- Weight: 87 kg (192 lb)

Rugby union career
- Position: Flanker
Senior career
Years	Team	Apps	(Points)
–	Benetton Treviso		
International career
Years	Team	Apps	(Points)
1980–1987	Italy	8	(0)
Coaching career
- Years: Team
- 1995–1999: Bologna
- 1999–2002: Mogliano
- 2002–2003: Italy U17
- 2003–2005: Italy U18
- 2005–2006: Italy U19
- 2006–2008: Italy U17
- 2008–2012: Casale
- 2012–: Paese

Mario Pavin (born Treviso, 18 July 1958) is a former Italian rugby union player and is currently a coach. He played as a flanker.

== Biography ==
A flanker, Pavin spent his career in Benetton Treviso; called up in the Italy national team for the first time in 1980. During a match of the 1980-1981 FIRA Trophy at Rovigo against the Soviet Union, he had to wait 6 years before being called up again (against France A1, 1986). He took part, under the direction of the coach Marco Bollesan, in the 1987 Rugby World Cup in Australia and New Zealand, where he played his last international match, at Christchurch, against Argentina.

After his retirement as player, he became a coach for Bologna and for Mogliano (currently San Marco) before entering into the federal rules, being in charge of coaching the U17 and U19 Italian national youth teams. In the 2008–09 season Pavin was appointed coach for Casale and a member of the provincial coaching staff of FIR's Interregional Committee of Triveneto. He has been the head coach for Rugby Paese since 2012.
