= Epineri Naituku =

Fijian rugby union player (1963–2019)

- Born: Epineri Taganesei Naituku; 8 January 1963 Fiji
- Died: 29 October 2019 (aged 56) Suva, Fiji

Rugby union career
- Position: Centre
Senior career
Years	Team	Apps	(Points)
19??-19??	Nasinu		
International career
Years	Team	Apps	(Points)
1987–1988	Fiji	2	(0)

Epineri Taganesei Naituku (8 January 1963 – 29 October 2019) was a Fijian rugby union player. He played as centre.

== Career ==
He was capped for Fiji twice, in the 1987 Rugby World Cup, playing the matches against Argentina, on 24 May, at Hamilton and Italy, on 31 May, at Dunedin, the latter of which was his last international cap. Naituku also played for the South Sea Barbarians, a team made up of Fijian, Samoan and Tongan players, which played a rebel tour in apartheid-era South Africa.
