= David Kirk =

New Zealand rugby union player and businessman

David Kirk MBE
- Born: David Edward Kirk; 5 October 1960 (age 66) Wellington, New Zealand
- Height: 1.73 m (5 ft 8 in)
- Weight: 73 kg (161 lb)
- School: Wanganui Collegiate School
- University: University of Otago; Worcester College, Oxford
- Occupation: Chief Executive Officer/Director of Rugby

Rugby union career
- Position: Halfback
Provincial / State sides
Years	Team	Apps	(Points)
1982–84	Otago	27	(24)
1985–87	Auckland	40	(48)
International career
Years	Team	Apps	(Points)
1983–87	New Zealand	17	(24)
1983-85	NZ Universities	9	(4)

David Edward Kirk MBE (born 5 October 1960) is a former New Zealand rugby union player. He is best known for having been the captain of the All Blacks when they won the inaugural Rugby World Cup in 1987.

== Early years ==
Kirk was born in Wellington and grew up in Palmerston North. He was educated at Russell Street School, Wanganui Collegiate School, and the University of Otago, where he graduated with a medical degree MB ChB.

== Rugby union career ==
Kirk played domestic rugby for Otago and Auckland, and first toured with the All Blacks in 1983. He stood out from his fellow players as "urbane, articulate and thoughtful," and when the planned 1986 All Black tour to South Africa was cancelled Kirk and John Kirwan were the only two players to refuse to join the rebel "Cavaliers" team on moral grounds: he felt that it would give comfort to the apartheid regime.

With the rebels banned from playing in the next two All Black test he captained the so-called "Baby Blacks". On the return of the rebels however, his position was uncomfortable and he was lucky to retain his place in the squad. Despite this, when original captain Andy Dalton had to withdraw with an injury, Kirk was made captain, and led New Zealand to victory over France in the 1987 Rugby World Cup Final.

He was appointed a Member of the Order of the British Empire in the 1988 New Year Honours, for services to rugby.

=== All Blacks statistics ===
- Tests: 17 (11 as captain)
- Games: 17 (0 as captain)
- Total matches: 34 (11 as captain)
- Test points: 24pts (6t, 0c, 0p, 0dg, 0m)
- Game points: 44pts (11t, 0c, 0p, 0dg, 0m)
- Total points: 68pts (17t, 0c, 0p, 0dg, 0m)

== Post-rugby life ==
Kirk abruptly retired from competitive rugby after the World Cup win, at the age of 26, to take up a Rhodes Scholarship at Worcester College, Oxford with a degree in PPE.

After his studies at Oxford, he returned to New Zealand, becoming the coach of the Wellington NPC team in 1993 and 1994 and also a media commentator. A National Party member, he sought the party's nomination for the 1992 Tamaki by-election, losing to Clem Simich. Kirk was also a staffer for Prime Minister Jim Bolger, and worked as a management consultant at McKinsey & Company. Later he was employed by Fletcher Challenge, then New Zealand's largest company, and one of its successors, Fletcher Energy.

From October 2005 to December 2008 he was chief executive officer of Fairfax Media, the publisher of The Sydney Morning Herald, The Age and The Australian Financial Review in Australia; and The Dominion Post and The Christchurch Press in New Zealand. On occasions he wrote articles for Fairfax, commentating on rugby when journalists were on strike.

His most recent involvement with rugby came in late 2009, when he led an independent arbitration panel appointed by SANZAR to settle an impasse between its three member unions (South Africa, New Zealand and Australia) over whether the planned 15th franchise in the Super Rugby competition would be awarded to Australia or South Africa, Ultimately, Melbourne was chosen and began play in 2011.

On 24 October 2011, Kirk was inducted into the IRB Hall of Fame alongside all other Rugby World Cup-winning captains and head coaches from the tournament's inception in 1987 through to 2007 (minus the previously inducted John Eales).

Kirk was a member of the Lord Howe Island Board, having been appointed by the NSW Minister for the Environment as the representative of business and tourism on the board, a specified position on the board. He was appointed on 27 November 2018 and served until 26 November 2021.

=== Current business roles ===
- Chairman of the Board at Trade Me Group.
- Director of a number of Forsyth Barr Ltd
- Kirk has been the chairman of KMD Brands since 2014. He will step down in 2026.
