= Jioji Cama =

Fijian rugby union footballer

- Born: Date of birth unknown Fiji
- Height: 6 ft 5 in (1.96 m)
- Weight: 210 lb (95 kg)

Rugby union career
- Position: Lock
Senior career
Years	Team	Apps	(Points)
1986–1990	Fiji Police Rugby Union		
1990–1993	Eastern Suburbs		
International career
Years	Team	Apps	(Points)
1987–1990	Fiji	1	(4)

Jioji Cama, sometimes spelt as Joji Cama (date of birth unknown) is a Fijian former rugby union footballer, he played as a lock.

== Career ==
He was part of the 1987 Rugby World Cup in Australia and New Zealand, although his only cap with the Fijian national team was during the match against the All Blacks in Christchurch, on 27 May 1987, where he scored a try.

Along with Jone Kubu and Fabiano Vakadranu, he played in 1991 for Eastern Suburbs, a rugby union club from Sydney.
