= Oscar Collodo =

Italy international rugby union player

- Born: 16 August 1958 (age 68) Bern, Switzerland

Rugby union career
- Position: Fly-half
Amateur team(s)
Years	Team	Apps	(Points)
1977-79	Treviso		
1979-84	Petrarca		
1984-93	Treviso		
International career
Years	Team	Apps	(Points)
1977–87	Italy	15	(47)

Oscar Collodo (born 16 August 1958) is a former Swiss Italian rugby union footballer. Collodo played mainly at fly-half.

Collodo was born in Bern, Switzerland. He played 15 Test matches for Italy between 1977 and 1987, scoring a total of 47 points. He made his international debut against Poland on 23 October 1977 when he kicked a conversion. He continued playing for Italy that season in the FIRA Championship, but did not play again for Italy again until 1986. He played in the inaugural 1987 Rugby World Cup and played against New Zealand (the All Blacks) in the first ever World Cup match. He became the first ever player to kick a penalty in Italy's 70–6 loss. His last international in Italy's 18–15 win over Fiji in that tournament.
