= Julio Clement =

Argentine rugby union player (born 1962)

Julio César Clement
- Born: July 1, 1962 (age 64) Santa Fe, Argentina

Rugby union career
- Position: Hooker
Senior career
Years	Team	Apps	(Points)
198?-198?	Club Universitario de Santa Fe		
International career
Years	Team	Apps	(Points)
1987-89	Argentina	2	(0)
Coaching career
- Years: Team
- -: Club Universitario de Santa Fe

Julio César Clement (born Santa Fe, 1 July 1962) is a former Argentine rugby union player and coach. He played as a hooker.

== Career ==
Always playing for Club Universitario de Santa Fe, Clement, playing as hooker, played also two matches for Argentina, being the only from his city to have played for the Pumas; these two international matches, against Uruguay and Brazil, made possible for Clement to win the South America Rugby Championship in 1987 and 1989. After his playing career, his coaching career and political career followed: As coach, he is present in the coaching staff of his club of origin, Universitario, as forwards coach, while as politician, he is Sports subsecretary and coordinator of the Santa Fe Province.
