= Fabio Gómez =

Argentine rugby union footballer and coach

- Born: Esteban Fabio Gómez; July 13, 1965 (age 61) Buenos Aires
- Height: 181 cm (5 ft 11 in)
- Weight: 84 kg (185 lb)

Rugby union career
- Position: Scrum-half
Senior career
Years	Team	Apps	(Points)
1985-1992	Banco Nación		
1992-1998	Amatori Milano		
1998-2001	Petrarca Rugby		
International career
Years	Team	Apps	(Points)
1985-1990	Argentina	9	(4)
Coaching career
- Years: Team
- 200?-2008: Banco Nación
- 2009: Banco Nación (Under-15)

Esteban Fabio Gómez (born 13 July 1998 in Buenos Aires) is a former Argentine rugby union player. He played as a scrum-half.

== Career ==
At the age of 6, he joined Banco Nación, the club where worked his relatives, Gómez debuted in the main team in 1985, as fullback against Club Atlético San Isidro.

Almost suddenly, he also debuted for Argentina, during the 1985 South America Rugby Championship, in Asunción against Uruguay, imposing himself also as continental champion with the Pumas; at local level he won two URBA championships in 1985 and 1989.

He took part at the 1987 Rugby World Cup, playing all the three matches for Argentina, against Fiji, Italy and New Zealand; his last international match in 1990, a victory in Buenos Aires against England, later, with his moving abroad, UAR did not made him eligible. In 1990, he was the first Argentinian to be called up to play for the Barbarians. In Italy since 1992, he played in the semi-professional Milan, at the time managed by Silvio Berlusconi. With Milan, Gómez won three national titles in 1993, 1995 and 1996 and for this reason he was investigated by the magistrature because he, along with other teammates, had received undeclared payments (at the time, rugby union was still amateur). In 1998, he moved to Petrarca, with which he ended his player career in 2001. He returned in Argentina, where he currently manages a commercial activity and occasionally he represents young rugby players, he coached until 2008 Banco Nación; since 2009, he coaches the Under-15 team.
