= Kavekini Nalaga =

Fijian rugby union footballer

- Born: circa 1965 Nasama, Nadroga, Fiji

Rugby union career
- Position: Wing
Senior career
Years	Team	Apps	(Points)
19??-1989	Nadroga		
International career
Years	Team	Apps	(Points)
1986-1989	Fiji	11	(6)

Kavekini Nalaga (born Nadroga, circa 1965) is a Fijian former rugby union footballer who played as wing. He is the father of Napolioni Nalaga, who also plays as wing.

== Career ==
His first cap for Fiji was during the match against Samoa, at Nuku'alofa, on 2 July 1986. Nalaga was in the 1987 Rugby World Cup roster, where he played the match against Argentina, in Hamilton, on 24 May. His last international cap was against Tonga, in Suva, on 15 July 1989.
