= Serupepeli Tuvula =

Fijian rugby union footballer

- Born: c. 1963 Nadi, Fiji
- Height: 5 ft 10 in (1.78 m)
- Weight: 187 lb (85 kg)
- Notable relative(s): Vatemo Ravouvou (nephew); Asinate Ravouvou (sister)

Rugby union career
- Position: Wing
Senior career
Years	Team	Apps	(Points)
198?-1987	Nadi		
–	Teachers-Norths		
Provincial / State sides
Years	Team	Apps	(Points)
1987	Queensland		
International career
Years	Team	Apps	(Points)
1985-1987	Fiji	7	(8)

Serupepeli Tuvula (born c. 1963 in Nadi) is a Fijian former rugby union footballer, he played as wing.

== Career ==
His first international cap for Fiji was during a mach against Australia, at Sydney, on 17 August 1985. Tuvula also played in the 1987 Rugby World Cup, playing 3 matches, with the match against Italy at Dunedin, on 31 May 1987 being his last international cap. At club level, He played for Nadi in the Farebrother Cup, and later, he played for Queensland.
