= Tom Mitchell (rugby union, born 1958) =

- Born: May 10, 1958 (age 68) Taveuni, Fiji
- Height: 5 ft 11 in (1.80 m)
- Weight: 198 lb (90 kg)
- Occupation: Private in the Fijian Army

Rugby union career
- Position(s): Wing, Centre
Senior career
Years	Team	Apps	(Points)
1986-1988	Army		
International career
Years	Team	Apps	(Points)
1986-1988	Fiji	11	(24)

Tom Mitchell (born 10 May 1958 in Taveuni) is a Fijian former rugby union footballer, who played as wing or centre.

== Career ==
At club level, he played for the Fiji Army rugby union team. His first cap for Fiji was during a match against Tonga, at Nuku'alofa, on 28 June 1986. He was also part of the 1987 Rugby World Cup squad, where he played two matches, in the pool match against Italy and in the quarter-final lost against France. His last international cap was against Tonga, at Nadi, on 8 October 1988.
