= Alejandro Schiavio =

Argentine rugby union player (born 1961)

- Born: Alejandro M. Schiavio; January 28, 1961 (age 65) Argentina

Rugby union career
- Position: Flanker
Senior career
Years	Team	Apps	(Points)
1983-1987	Club Pueyrredón		
International career
Years	Team	Apps	(Points)
1983-1987	Argentina	6	(0)

Alejandro Schiavio (born 28 January 1961) is an Argentinian former rugby union flanker. He is currently the chairman of Club Pueyrredón, where he played for all his career.

== Career ==
He spent all of his career playing for Club Pueyrredón. He was first capped for Argentina in the match against Chile, in Buenos Aires, on 16 June 1983. He was also called up for the 1987 Rugby World Cup, where he played all the three matches of the pool stage against Fiji, Italy and New Zealand, the latter being his last international cap, earning 6 caps in total.
