= John Drake (rugby union) =

- Born: John Alan Drake; 22 January 1959 Auckland, New Zealand
- Died: 13 December 2008 (aged 49) Mount Maunganui, New Zealand
- Height: 1.83 m (6 ft 0 in)
- Weight: 99 kg (218 lb)
- School: Auckland Grammar School

Rugby union career
- Position: Prop
Provincial / State sides
Years	Team	Apps	(Points)
1981–87	Auckland	85	
International career
Years	Team	Apps	(Points)
1980–82	NZ Universities		
1985–87	New Zealand	8	(4)

John Alan Drake (22 January 1959 – 13 December 2008) was a New Zealand rugby union footballer who represented the All Blacks and Auckland as a tighthead prop.

He played twelve times for New Zealand including eight test matches. He debuted for the All Blacks on the 1985 tour of Argentina playing in the 56–6 thumping of Mar del Plata. Drake was a key member of the 1987 All Black team which won the 1987 Rugby World Cup, playing in five of the six matches including scoring a try in the semi-final victory against Wales and playing in the final against France.

He retired at the end of the 1987 season while only 28 and later became a newspaper columnist and television commentator. Drake was educated at Auckland Grammar School. He died suddenly at his home, aged 49, on 13 December 2008.
