= Franco Berni =

Italy international rugby union player

- Born: 9 January 1965 (age 61) Alessandria, Italy

Rugby union career
- Position: Lock
Senior career
Years	Team	Apps	(Points)
1981-1982	Alessandria		
1982-1987	Milano		
1987-1997	Amatori Milano		
1997-1999	CUS Genova		
1999-2000	Piacenza		
International career
Years	Team	Apps	(Points)
1985-1989	Italy	10	(0)
Coaching career
- Years: Team
- 2001-2005: Piacenza
- 2005-2008: Alessandria
- 2008-: VII Rugby Torino

Franco Berni (born 9 January 1965) is a former Italian rugby union player from Alessandria, Italy. He played as lock.

== Biography ==
A lock with a powerful body build (approximately 150 kg (330 lb) and 2 m (6.6 ft) high), Berni started his rugby career in DLF Alessandria; then he moved to Alessandria in 1981–1982. He was part of the squad that was promoted from Serie C to Serie B.

In 1982 he moved to ASR Milano and became almost then an under-17 international; he was also awarded by Gazzetta dello Sport as Serie A's best under-21.

In 1985, he debuted for Italy at Brașov, against Romania, and two years later, he was in the 1987 Rugby World Cup roster, where Berni took part only a match, against the All Blacks, which is also the first match in the history of the World Cup. Moving to Amatori Milano, with such team, later known as Milan, won four scudetti and a Coppa Italia in the 1990s; later, at the CUS Genova, he was between the protagonists of the promotion from Serie B to Serie A2.

He was also invited several times to Zebre, with which played several international matches.

He ended his playing career in Piacenza in 2000, where he started his coach career. Again in Alessandria until 2008, after the 2008–2009 season he coached Settimo Torinese and then moved on to coach the Genoan team Zena Wasps Rugby.

He had also a politician career: in 1997 he was candidate for communal councillor in Alessandria for Forza Italia.
