= Aisake Nadolo =

Fijian rugby union player (1964–2009)

- Born: Aisake Nadolo Tokaduadua; 13 July 1964 Fiji
- Died: 30 July 2009 (aged 45)
- Height: 6 ft 6 in (1.98 m)
- Weight: 252 lb (114 kg)
- School: Marist Brothers High School

Rugby union career
- Position: Lock
Amateur team(s)
Years	Team	Apps	(Points)
–	Marist Brothers High School		
–	Queen Victoria School		
Senior career
Years	Team	Apps	(Points)
1987-1995	Suva		
International career
Years	Team	Apps	(Points)
1987-1995	Fiji	23	(5)

Aisake Nadolo (13 July 1964 – 30 July 2009) was a Fijian rugby union player. He played as lock.

== Career ==
His first cap for Fiji was during the 1987 Rugby World Cup in the match against Italy, at Dunedin on 31 May, in the tournament he also took part at the quarter-final against France. He also was part of the 1991 Rugby World Cup roster, where he played just the match against Romania, at Brive-la-Gaillarde. His last cap for Fiji was during a match against Ireland, at Lansdowne Road, on 18 November 1995.
