= Jo Sovau =

- Born: Josateki Sovau circa 1951 Saunaka, Nadi, Fiji
- Died: April 2005 (aged 53–54)
- Height: 6 ft 2 in (1.88 m)
- Weight: 252 lb (114 kg)
- Occupation: Cane farmer

Rugby union career
- Position: Prop
Senior career
Years	Team	Apps	(Points)
- Saunaka Rugby Club
–	Nadi		
International career
Years	Team	Apps	(Points)
1970–1979	Fiji	11	(9)
Coaching career
- Years: Team
- 1987: Fiji

Ratu Josateki Sovau (born Nadi, c. 1951 – April 2005) was a Fijian rugby union player, coach and Taukei Naua. He played as a prop.

== Career ==
His first international cap for Fiji was during a match against New Zealand Māori, at Christchurch, on 25 July 1970. He retired from the national team after a match against Tonga, at Suva, on 8 September 1979.

== Coach career ==
During the 1987 Rugby World Cup, with George Simpkin as technical advisor, Sovau coached the Fiji national team. Under his guidance, Fiji qualified for the quarter-finals, causing a major upset by beating the Pumas 28–9 before losing to Italy by three points (15–18) and to New Zealand 13–74.
