= Martín Yangüela =

Argentine rugby union player (born 1957)

- Born: April 1, 1962 (age 64) Argentina

Rugby union career
- Position: Scrum-half
Senior career
Years	Team	Apps	(Points)
198?-1987	Pueyrredón		
International career
Years	Team	Apps	(Points)
1987	Argentina	1	(0)

Martín Yangüela (born 1 April 1957) is a former Argentine rugby union player. He played as a scrum-half.

== Career ==
A scrum-half, Yangüela played for Pueyrredón in his entire career. He had his only international cap for the Pumas in the 1987 Rugby World Cup, when Argentina played against Italy, at Christchurch, on 28 May 1987.
