= George Simpkin =

New Zealand rugby union coach (1943–2020)

- Born: George Dreadon Simpkin; 22 May 1943 Northland, New Zealand
- Died: 7 May 2020 (aged 76)

Rugby union career
Amateur team(s)
Years	Team	Apps	(Points)
–	Matamata College		
Coaching career
- Years: Team
- 1976–1984: Waikato
- 1984–1990: Fiji 7s
- 1987–1991: Fiji
- 1993–1999: Hong Kong
- 1993–1999: Hong Kong 7s
- 1999–2000: Kandy
- 2002: China 7s
- 2003–2004: Sri Lanka
- 2006–2008: SC Frankfurt 1880
- 2010: Germany 7s
- 2017: Shandong Provincial Team

George Dreadon Simpkin (22 May 1943 – 7 May 2020) was a New Zealand rugby union coach, known for working with the national teams of Fiji, Hong Kong and Sri Lanka. He made a great contribution to the development of rugby union and rugby sevens in those countries.

== Biography ==
=== Early coaching career ===
A native of Northland, he taught at Matamata College, where he began his coaching career in 1966 as a physical education teacher and Rugby coach, leading the Matamata College 1st XV on a groundbreaking (for a schoolboys team) tour of Wales at the end of 1974. At the time, the team was the holder of the Tricolour Trophy. Between 1976 and 1984. Simpkin coached Waikato and achieved 56 victories in a row. As part of the Waikato team, he advanced to the first division of the National Provincial Championship, winning in 1980 the Ranfurly Shield, beating the Auckland team. In aggregate, under his leadership, Waikato played 152 matches in the provincial championship, winning 95 matches, drawing 3 and losing 54, among these, Waikato won a match against the French national team. Simpkin dreamed of one day becoming the head of All Blacks.

=== Fiji ===
Between 1987 and 1991, Simpkin coached the Fiji national team: in 1987 he took the team to the quarterfinals of the first world championship in tandem with Jo Sovau; in 1991 he coached alongside Samisoni Viriviri, however, the team did not get past the group stage. Simpkin also coached the Fiji Sevens team between 1984 and 1990, with which he won the annual Hong Kong Sevens in 1984 and 1990. It is believed that it was Simpkin who saw the talent of the future world star Waisale Serevi.

=== Hong Kong and China ===
In 1988–1999, he permanently worked in the Hong Kong Rugby Football Union, developing rugby in China and organizing the first matches among the PLA military personnel in Hong Kong after the British transfer of Hong Kong to China in 1997. His contribution to the development of Hong Kong rugby is highly regarded in the country: Simpkin helped the Hong Kong tournament acquire the status of the most prestigious, creating a number of rugby clubs (Hong Kong Dragons, Gai Wu, Tigers, Bulls, Nomads, Typhoons).

=== Sri Lanka ===
For some time, Simpkin also worked with the national teams of Sri Lanka, raising the level of development of sports in the country. The rugby union team under his leadership won for the first time in a test match played away against Kazakhstan. In 2003, thanks to his efforts, the first Carlton Super Sevens tournament was held in Sri Lanka.

=== End of career ===
Later, Simpkin coached the German club SC Frankfurt 1880 in the 2006–07 season. In 2010, he led the Germany sevens team, which he was preparing for the 2016 Olympic Games in Rio de Janeiro.

== Contribution to the development of world rugby ==
It is believed that George Simpkin developed a plastic kicking tee (influenced by the Canadians) [5] on which the ball is placed before a conversion or free kick. These tees were later used in rugby by top kickers such as Andrew Mehrtens, Joel Stransky, John Eales and Dan Carter. He also introduced a number of new rules to rugby sevens. For example, a team that scored a try in a rugby sevens match must kick the ball from the center of the field after a conversion kick to restart the game; on his own initiative, the players were allowed to drop the ball with their hands before kicking a conversion; the play of the lineout was simplified and the hookers had to grab onto the props with their hands during the scrum.

== Personal life ==
He was married to Pip, he had two daughters, Leigh and Greer, two grandsons, Carter and Curtis, who live in Sydney and a granddaughter, Holly, who lives in Berlin. During the quarantine, his daughter Greer wrote to him the poem Ode to George, dedicated to her father.

Throughout his life, Simpkin fought against arthritis with Traditional Chinese medicine to strengthen his health. Simpkin died of cancer in Hamilton, on 7 May 2020.
