= Jone Kubu =

Fijian rugby union footballer

- Born: circa 1961 Navatuvula, Naitasiri, Fiji
- Height: 5 ft 8 in (173 cm)
- Weight: 168 lb (76 kg)

Rugby union career
- Position: Fullback
Senior career
Years	Team	Apps	(Points)
19??-1987	Rewa		
1987-1997	Eastern Suburbs		
International career
Years	Team	Apps	(Points)
1985-1988	Fiji	11	(6)

Jone Kubu (born Naitasiri, circa 1961) is a Fijian former rugby union footballer, he played as a fullback. His nephew is Marika Kubu, who plays for Sila Central High School.

== Career ==
He was capped for Fiji in 1985, during a match against Wales, at Cardiff, on 9 November. He was also part of the 1987 Rugby World Cup Fijian squad, playing three matches in the tournament. His last international cap was against England, in Suva, on 16 June 1988. After the 1987 Rugby World Cup, Kubu was recruited for the Australian club Eastern Suburbs RUFC, where he played for 13 years.
