= Piergianni Farina =

Italy international rugby union player

- Born: 1 July 1959 (age 67) Bassano del Grappa, Italy

Rugby union career
- Position(s): Flanker, Number 8
Amateur team(s)
Years	Team	Apps	(Points)
-	Rugby Bassano		
Senior career
Years	Team	Apps	(Points)
-	Petrarca Rugby		
International career
Years	Team	Apps	(Points)
1987	Italy	3	(0)

Piergianni Farina (born 1 June 1959 in Bassano del Grappa) is a former Italian rugby union player who played as flanker and number 8.

== Biography ==
Coming from Rugby Bassano, Farina later moved to Padua, playing for Petrarca Rugby.

With the Paduan team, Farina became Italian champion for four consecutive seasons.

He played three matches with the Italy national team: debuting in the 1985-87 FIRA Trophy against France A1, he was among the starting members in two 1987 Rugby World Cup matches: against New Zealand and Fiji, in the former as flanker and in the latter, as number eight.

== Bibliography ==
Various Authors, Attimi senza tempo. Bassano del Grappa, Editrice Artistica Bassano 2001 (biographic traits of sportspeople from Veneto).
