= Paulo Nawalu =

Fijian rugby union player (born 1959)

- Born: October 18, 1958 (age 68) Lautoka, Fiji
- Height: 5 ft 11 in (1.80 m)
- Weight: 201 lb (91 kg)

Rugby union career
- Position: Scrum-half
Amateur team(s)
Years	Team	Apps	(Points)
1970-1972	Nailili Catholic Mission School		
1973-1977	Marist Brothers High School		
1978-1980	Corpus Christi Teachers Colts		
Senior career
Years	Team	Apps	(Points)
1978-1990	St. John's Marist Club		
1981-1990	Suva		
1990-2000	Hino Motors		
2000-2012	Kawagoe Fighters		
International career
Years	Team	Apps	(Points)
1983-1989	Fiji	17	(7)
National sevens team
Years	Team		Comps
1992-1995	Japan		
Coaching career
- Years: Team
- 1981-1989: Cathedral Secondary High School (senior team)
- 1991-1999: Hino Motors
- 1992-2001: Japan 7s
- 2000-2012: Hakuoh University
- 2002-2013 (Skill Coach): Japan 7s
- 2015-: Karada Factory A.P. Pirates

Paulo Nawalu, spelt also as Paula Nawalu (born October 18, 1958 in Lautoka) is a former rugby union player. He played as a scrum-half.

== Career ==
His first international match was against Tonga, at Suva, on June 8, 1983. He was also part of the 1987 Rugby World Cup roster, as well of the South Pacific Barbarians during their 1987 tour in South Africa. Later, Nawalu played for the Japan national rugby sevens team, with which he played the 1993 Rugby World Cup Sevens. Nawalu was the first Fijian player to play in a Japanese team, when he played for Hino Motors.

== Personal life ==
He is the father of rugby union player Manueli Nawalu.

== Coaching career ==
He trained the Japan national rugby sevens team during the 1997 and the 2001 Rugby World Cup Sevens. Currently, since 2015, he is coaching Karada Factory A.P. Pirates, a Japanese women's rugby sevens team.
