= Giancarlo Cucchiella =

Italian rugby union player

- Born: 18 February 1953 (age 73) L'Aquila, Italy
- Notable relative: Elisa Cucchiella (daughter)

Rugby union career
- Position: Prop
Senior career
| Years | Team | Apps | (Points) |
| 1969-74 | L'Aquila | | |
| 1974-76 | Fiamme Oro | | |
| 1976-77 | CUS Milano | | |
| 1977-80 | L'Aquila | | |
| 1981-83 | Noceto | | |
- Frascati
| 1983-84 | L'Aquila | | |
| 1984-87 | Frascati | | |
International career
| Years | Team | Apps | (Points) |
| 1973-1987 | Italy | 22 | (4) |

Giancarlo Cucchiella (L'Aquila, 18 February 1953) is a former Italian rugby union player. He played as a prop.

== Career ==
A prop, he started in L'Aquila, before moving to Noceto from Parma province. Cucchiella debuted in L'Aquila Rugby at 17 years and 8 months, under the management of Sergio Del Grande, on 11 October 1970, in the match Sanson Rovigo vs L'Aquila 3-3. With L'Aquila, he collected 172 caps and scored 60 points resulted from 15 tries.

== International career ==
An Italian international since 1973, with his first match against an Australian XV at Tommaso Fattori stadium in L'Aquila, while his first full international was in 1979 against Poland. Cucchiella played 22 full matches for Italy, with his last cap, against Fiji, during the 1987 Rugby World Cup, where he scored also his only international points and one try, which at the time was 4 points.

== Personal life ==
His daughter Elisa is rugby union player – a prop, like her father – and an Italian international for Italy women's national team since 2005.
