= Ilaitia Savai =

Fijian rugby union player (1960–2015)

- Born: 12 July 1960 Nakalawaca, Tailevu Fiji
- Died: 22 January 2015 (aged 54) Nadi, Fiji
- Height: 6 ft 6 in (1.98 m)
- Weight: 242 lb (110 kg)

Rugby union career
- Position: Lock
Amateur team(s)
| Years | Team | Apps | (Points) |
| 1986-1987 | Hamilton Marist | | |
| 1987-1989 | Redcliffe | | |
Senior career
| Years | Team | Apps | (Points) |
| 1981-1982 | Hyatt | | |
| 1982-1986 | Nadroga | | |
| 1989-1990 | Suva | | |
| 1990-1998 | Nadi | | |
Provincial / State sides
| Years | Team | Apps | (Points) |
| 1986-1987 | Waikato | 25 | (8) |
| 1987-1989 | Queensland | | |
International career
| Years | Team | Apps | (Points) |
| 1984-1995 | Fiji | 38 | (26) |

Ilaitia Savai (Nakalawaca, 12 July 1960 - Nadi 22 January 2015) was a Fijian rugby union player. He played as a lock.

== Career ==
Savai made his debut for Fiji at the Suva National Stadium when he came in on the 40th minute as a substitute in the test against Australia. He played for Fiji from 1984 to 1995 earning 38 caps from 91 appearances. He was in the 1987 and 1991 Rugby World Cup rosters, playing 7 matches, scoring 4 points and 1 try. Savai also captained Fiji in the 1990 test against Japan, Tonga, Samoa and Hong Kong and later led the team to the tour of New Zealand in the same year. Under his captaincy, Fiji won three out of four tests. His last international cap was during a match against Canada, at Nadi, on April 8, 1995.

== Death ==
Savai died on February 2, 2015. He was laid to rest at his village of Nakalawaca and is survived by his wife and three children. Among family and friends shocked to hear the news of his death, was former Fiji teammate Mosese Taga.
