= Alessandro Ghini =

Italian rugby union player and coach

- Born: 4 May 1961
- Occupation(s): rugby union player and coach

Alessandro Ghini (born Parma, 4 May 1961) is a former Italian rugby union player and a current coach. He played as a scrum-half.

Ghini started his player career at Rugby Parma F.C. 1931, where he premiered in the first team in 1977, aged only 15 years old. He played for Parma, from 1976/77 to 1988/89. He moved afterwards to Amatori Rugby Milano, where he played from 1989/90 to 1990/91, winning the National Championship of Excellence the final season. He spent a season at False Bay, a South African team from Cape Town, in 1992. Returning to Parma, he was player-coach for four seasons, from 1993/94 to 1996/97.

He had 26 caps for Italy, from 1981 to 1988, without ever scoring. He was called for the 1987 Rugby World Cup, playing in a single game.

After becoming a full-time coach, he was in charge of Rugby Reggio (1997/98-2002/03), and Parma (2003/04-2006/07), where he won the Italy Cup, in 2005/06. He was the coach of Italy A, in 2007/08, Italy U-20, in 2008/09, and Italy U-18, from 2009/10 to 2011/12. He is the coach of Rugby Reggio, once again, since 2012/13.
