= Antonio Colella =

Italian rugby union player

Antonio Colella (born 4 September 1961 in Rome) is a former Italian rugby union player and a current sports director. He played as a lock.

== Club career ==
Colella played for L'Aquila Rugby, from 1981/82 to 1999/2000. He had his first game at 17 January 1982, aged 20 years old, thanks to head coach Loreto Cucchiarelli. He won twice the National Championship of Excellence, in 1981/82 and 1993/94. He finished his career at Rieti Rugby, where he played from 2000/01 to 2001/02.

== International career ==
He had 41 caps for Italy, from 1983 to 1990, scoring 2 tries, 8 points on aggregate. He had his first game at the 13–6 win over Romania, at 10 April 1983, in Buzau, for the 1982–83 FIRA Trophy. He was called for the 1987 Rugby World Cup, playing in two games and remaining scoreless. He had his last game at the 9–16 loss to Romania, at 14 April 1990, for the 1989–90 FIRA Trophy. He was called for the 1991 Rugby World Cup, but he was left uncapped.

== Post-player activity ==
Colella has been sports director at L'Aquila Rugby, after his retirement. In 2006, he was in charge of the U-15 section.

== International Statistics ==
- Antonio Colella at ESPNscrum (archived)
