= Tomasi Cama =

Fijian rugby union footballer (born 1961)

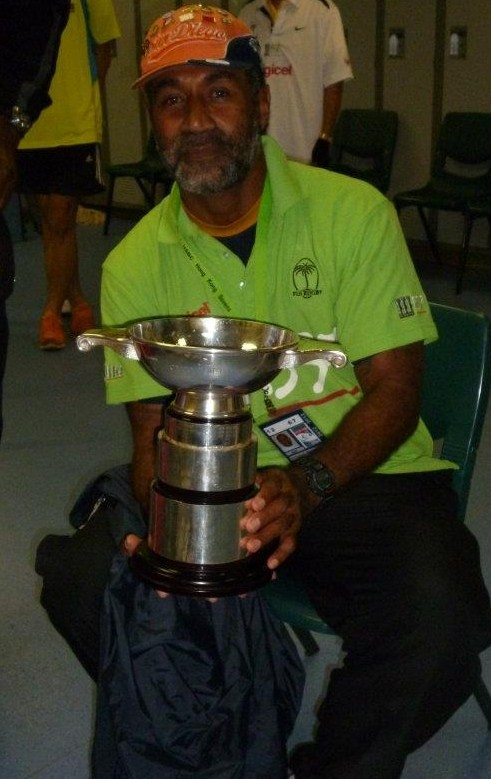
- Born: Tomasi Cama; 21 February 1961 (age 65) Suva, Fiji
- Height: 1.80 m (5 ft 11 in)
- Weight: 84 kg (13 st 3 lb)
- Notable relative: Junior Tomasi Cama (son)
- Occupation: Rugby Development Officer in Malaysia

Rugby union career
- Position: Wing
Senior career
Years	Team	Apps	(Points)
-	Suva		
–	Nabua		
International career
Years	Team	Apps	(Points)
1984-1990	Fiji	13	(8)
National sevens team
Years	Team		Comps
1980-1992	Fiji		
Coaching career
- Years: Team
- ????-2011: Malaysia sevens
- 2005-2006: Chinese Taipei sevens
- 2001: Fiji

Tomasi Camaneisenirosi is a Fijian former rugby union footballer. He played for Nabua Rugby Club in Fiji and won 14 caps playing for Fiji making his test debut 10 August 1985 against Australia at Ballymore, Brisbane scoring a try. He played four tests in the 1987 Rugby World Cup. His final match came against Western Samoa 23 Jun 1990.

He is better known as a rugby sevens player, representing Fiji for over ten years and was part of the sides that went unbeaten 1990–1992 in the Hong Kong Sevens.

He is the father of former New Zealand sevens player Junior Tomasi Cama.
