= Giuseppe Artuso =

Italy international rugby union player

- Born: 14 November 1956 (age 69) Reggio Calabria, Italy

Rugby union career
- Position: Flanker
Senior career
Years	Team	Apps	(Points)
1976-1977	Reggio Calabria		
1977-1996	Petrarca Rugby		
International career
Years	Team	Apps	(Points)
1977-1987	Italy	7	(0)
Coaching career
- Years: Team
- 2003-06: Petrarca Rugby(youth team)
- 2006-: Petrarca Rugby
- 2006-09: C.I.V.-F.I.R. (under-18)
- 2009-10: Roccia
- 2010-14: Petrarca Rugby (under-18)

Giuseppe Artuso (born 14 November 1956 in Reggio Calabria), is a former Italian rugby union player and currently, coach. He played as a flanker.

== Biography ==
Hailing from Calabria, Artuso played for all of his rugby career for Petrarca, club from Padua where he achieved several player successes and which he also coached and managed.

In the 1980s, Artuso was among the protagonists of the squad which won five scudetti, four of which were consecutive from 1984 to 1987, the first with Lucio Boccaletto as coach, the other three with Vittorio Munari in the club's bench.

He debuted in the national team during the 1977-78 FIRA Trophy at Warsaw, against Poland and took part to FIRA tournaments until 1987; his last cap for the Azzurri, as flanker, was on 22 May 1987, at Auckland, in the inaugural match of the 1987 Rugby World Cup against the All Blacks.

== Coach and director ==
As coach, Artuso first led the Petrarca youth team, and then, the main team (2001–05). After a season as assistant manager, he went to the federal tiers: he was in charge of the youth rugby development and coached the Under-16 of Padua and Vicenza province teams and FIR Triveneto Interregional Committee.

Between 2009 and 2014, he coached the main team of Roccia, from Padua Province.

From the 2015–16, he coaches the Petrarca Rugby Under 18 team.
