= Marco Bollesan =

Italian rugby union player (1941–2021)

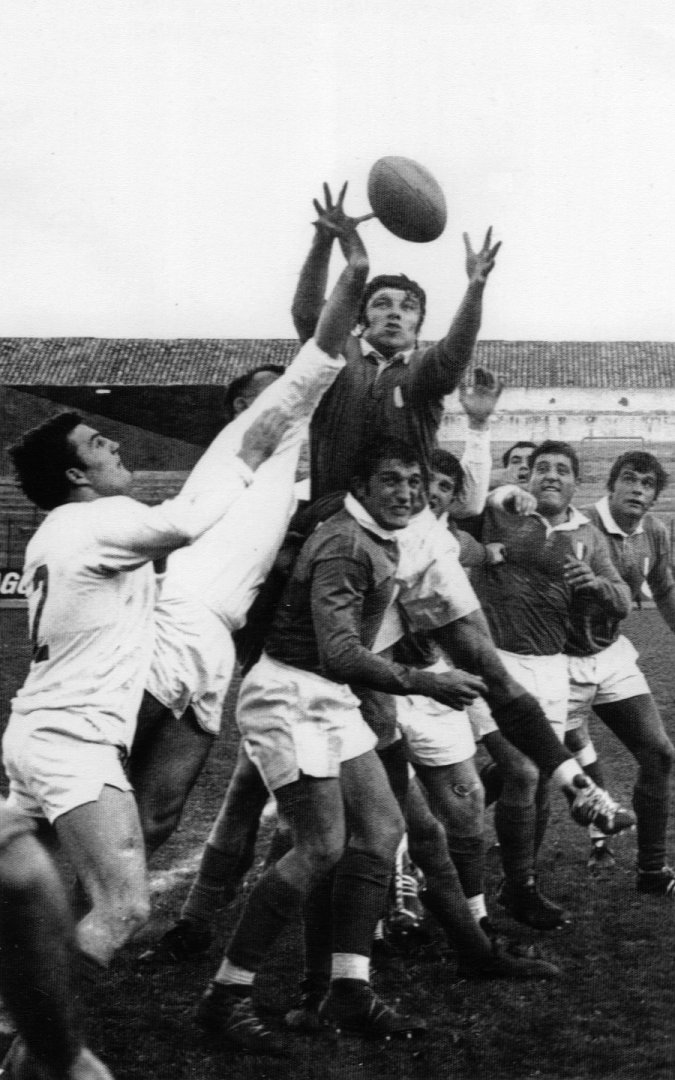
- Marco Bollesan (on top) jumping in lineout against West Germany, in 1968
- Born: Marco Bollesan; 7 July 1941 Chioggia, Venice, Italy
- Died: 11 April 2021 (aged 79) Bogliasco, Italy
- Occupation(s): Iron worker, Management, Public relations

Rugby union career
- Position: Number 8
Senior career
Years	Team	Apps	(Points)
1959-1965	CUS Genova		
1965-1966	Partenope		
1966-1976	Brescia		
1976-1981	Amatori Milano		
- Correct as of 3 June 2009
International career
Years	Team	Apps	(Points)
1963-1975	Italy	47	(24)
- Correct as of 3 June 2009
Coaching career
- Years: Team
- 1981-1985: Amatori Milano
- 1985-1988: Italy
- 1989-1992: Livorno
- 1992-1997: CUS Genoa
- 1997-2003: Alghero
- Correct as of 3 June 2009

Marco Bollesan (7 July 1941 – 11 April 2021) was an Italian rugby union player, coach and manager.

== Biography ==
Born in Chioggia, an industrial town in the then province of Venice, later he got a job as iron worker at the Italsider and started playing rugby as senior at the CUS Genoa Rugby (the University of Genoa rugby union team). During the conscription period he practiced rowing for the Italian National Military selection, but afterwards he returned to rugby. He made his international debut with the Italian team in 1963 at Grenoble against France (Italy lost 12-14).

Until 1975 he won 47 full caps and played 37 matches as captain. In 1965 he moved from Genoa to Naples to play with the Partenope that had just won the Italian championship. In order to get that the Neapolitan club's managed to get from Italsider the moving of the player from Genoa to the steel mill located in Bagnoli, near Naples. In 1966 Partenope won its second in a row - and to date, last - Championship. In 1967 Bollesan moved to Genoa, then, in 1974 to Brescia winning another Championship in 1975. He was then at Amatori Rugby Milano, until 1981 as player and until 1985 as coach.

From 1985 to 1988 he was the Italian National Team's head coach and took part at the 1987 Rugby World Cup. Later he managed Rugby Livorno, CUS Genova and Rugby Alghero. In 1997, when Amatori Milano was facing dire straits due to lack of money, he offered to coach the team for free. From 2003 to the 2008 Six Nations he was responsible for public relations for the Italian Rugby Federation, and was the chairman of SportinGenova, a company that manages all the sport venues owned by the comune of Genoa.

Bollesan died on 11 April 2021.

== Honours ==
Rugby Partenope
Serie A 1965-1966
Rugby Brescia
Serie A 1974-1975

== Awards ==
On 7 May 2015, in the presence of the President of Italian National Olympic Committee (CONI), Giovanni Malagò, was inaugurated in the Olympic Park of the Foro Italico in Rome, along Viale delle Olimpiadi, the Walk of Fame of Italian sport, consisting of 100 tiles that chronologically report names of the most representative athletes in the history of Italian sport. On each tile are the name of the sportsman, the sport in which he distinguished himself and the symbol of CONI. One of these tiles is dedicated to Marco Bollesan.

== See also ==
- Legends of Italian sport - Walk of Fame

Sporting positions
Preceded by (Italy) Paolo Paladini/Marco Pulli	Italy National Rugby Union Coach; 1985–1988	Succeeded by (Italy) Loreto Cucchiarelli
