= Mosese Taga =

Fijian rugby union player (1964–2022)

- Born: 17 September 1964 Nailaga, Yalalevu, Fiji
- Died: 1 February 2022 (aged 57)
- Height: 5 ft 8 in (1.73 m)
- Weight: 242 lb (110 kg)

Rugby union career
- Position(s): Prop, Hooker
Senior career
Years	Team	Apps	(Points)
- Suva
–	Nabua		
International career
Years	Team	Apps	(Points)
1987-1998	Fiji	48	(4)

Mosese Taga (17 September 1964 – 2 February 2022) was a Fijian rugby union player.

== Career ==
He debuted with the Flying Fijians during the 1987 Rugby World Cup, during the match against New Zealand at Christchurch, on 27 May 1987. He was also part of the 1991 Rugby World Cup roster, where he was the captain. His last international cap was during a match against Australia, at Sydney on 18 September 1998.

== Personal life and death ==
Taga died on 2 February 2022, at the age of 57. He was the father of Laisa Taga, who plays for Fiji women's national rugby union team as flanker.
