= Pauliasi Tabulutu =

Fiji dual-code rugby international footballer

Personal information
- Born: 15 July 1967 (age 59) Fiji

Playing information
- Height: 5 ft 10 in (1.78 m)
- Weight: 187 lb (13 st 5 lb; 85 kg)

Rugby union
- Position: Scrum-half
Club
Years	Team	Pld	T	G	FG	P
1986–91	Nabua
Representative
Years	Team	Pld	T	G	FG	P
1986–91	Fiji	34				4

Rugby league
- Position: halfback, scrum-half

Coaching information

Rugby union
Representative
Years	Team	Gms	W	D	L	W%
2004–06	Fiji Sevens

Rugby league
Representative
Years	Team	Gms	W	D	L	W%
1993–94	Fiji	2	1	0	1	50

Pauliasi Tabulutu (born 15 July 1967) is a Fijian former dual-code international rugby footballer. He played as scrum-half.

== Career ==
=== Rugby Union ===
His first cap for Fiji was during a match against Tonga at Nuku'alofa, on June 28, 1982. He was part of the 1987 and 1991 World Cup rosters. He last played for the Flying Fijians against Romania, at Brive-la-Gaillarde, on October 12, 1991. Tabulutu was also part of the 1990–1991 Hong Kong sevens team, coached by Kitione Tuibua, which won the Hong Kong Sevens title three years in a row. Prior to the 2005 Rugby World Cup Sevens in Hong Kong, he announced his resignation due to poor results at the World Sevens Series in Wellington and Los Angeles, being replaced by Wayne Pivac, who called up Serevi to the Fiji squad, which won the tournament.

In 2004, he replaced Sanivalati Laulau as coach of the Fiji national rugby sevens team, bringing back Waisale Serevi to the team.

=== Rugby League ===
Along with the late Nemani Matirewa, Tabulutu was a pioneer in the Fijian rugby league scene after retiring from his rugby union career in 1992. His only international league cap was against Papua New Guinea on 19 June 1993, where Fiji was defeated by 24–35. Tabulutu also represented Fiji, coached by Culden Kamea, at the Nissan World Sevens in Sydney. He also coached the Fiji Bati in 1993–94.

== Personal life ==
Tabulutu is the uncle of former Fijian international rugby union player Joeli Veitayaki Jr..
