= Massimo Mascioletti =

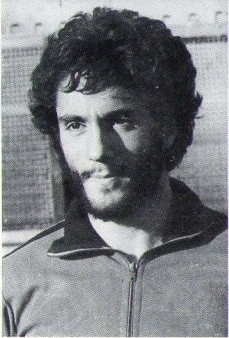
- Born: 4 March 1958 (age 68) L'Aquila, Italy

Rugby union career
- Position(s): Wing, Centre
Senior career
Years	Team	Apps	(Points)
1973-1990	L'Aquila	227	(908)
International career
Years	Team	Apps	(Points)
1977-1990	Italy	54	(68)
Coaching career
- Years: Team
- 1993-1995: L'Aquila
- 1995-1999: Italy (assistant coach)
- 1999-2000: Italy
- 2003-2008: Capitolina

Massimo Mascioletti (born 4 March 1958 in L'Aquila) is an Italian rugby union coach and a former player. He used to play as a wing and as a centre.

== Career ==
Mascioletti had 54 caps for Italy, from 1977 to 1990, scoring 17 tries, 68 points in aggregate, and was their captain from 1983 to 1985. He played three games at the 1987 Rugby World Cup finals, scoring a try.

He was Georges Coste assistant coach for three years, from 1995 to 1999, and took office as head coach in 1999, after some bad results from his predecessor. He was in charge of the Italian Squad at the 1999 Rugby World Cup finals. Italy did not pass round 1, but they were promoted to the Five Nations tournament, since then called Six Nations. He left office the following year.

Sporting positions
Preceded by (France) Georges Coste	Italy National Rugby Union Coach; 1999–2000	Succeeded by (New Zealand) Brad Johnstone
