= Koli Rakoroi =

Fijian rugby union footballer (born 1956)

- Born: Kolinio Rakoroi; 1 July 1956 (age 70) Fiji
- Height: 6 ft 5 in (1.96 m)
- Weight: 217 lb (98 kg)
- Occupation: Naval officer

Rugby union career
- Position(s): Lock, Number 8
Senior career
Years	Team	Apps	(Points)
- Navy
Provincial / State sides
Years	Team	Apps	(Points)
- Suva
International career
Years	Team	Apps	(Points)
1983-1987	Fiji	21	(8)

Kolinio "Koli" Rakoroi (born 1 July 1956) is a Fijian former rugby union footballer, he played as a lock or number eight. He was the captain for the Flying Fijians in the 1987 Rugby World Cup.

== Career ==
His first international cap for the Flying Fijians was against Tonga, at Suva, on June 18, 1983. He was present in the 1987 Rugby World Cup roster, which he captained. His last cap was against Tonga, at Suva, on August 29, 1987. He also played for Suva.
