= Salacieli Naivilawasa =

Fiji international rugby union footballer (born 1961)

- Born: 14 February 1961 (age 65) Vitawa, Ra, Fiji
- Height: 5 ft 9 in (1.75 m)
- Weight: 198 lb (90 kg)
- School: Xavier College
- Occupation: Police superintendent

Rugby union career
- Position: Hooker
Senior career
Years	Team	Apps	(Points)
-	Suva		
International career
Years	Team	Apps	(Points)
1986-1991	Fiji	21	(8)

Salacieli Naivilawasa (born 14 February 1961 in Ra) is a Fijian former rugby union footballer, he played as hooker.

== Career ==
His first international match was against Tonga, at Nuku'alofa, on 28 June 1986. He was also part of the 1987 Rugby World Cup Fijian squad, playing 3 matches, scoring a try in the pool match against Argentina at Hamilton, on 24 May. He also was in the 1991 Rugby World Cup roster, where he played only the match against Canada on 5 October 1991, the last match for the Flying Fijians in his career.

== After career ==
Currently he works in the Fiji Police Force as Divisional Police Commander and senior superintendent in the Western Division. He joined the force as an 18-year-old straight out of Xavier College and began his career at the Valelevu base in Suva, before transferring to the mobile unit and then to Sigatoka.
