= 1987 Rugby World Cup =

1st Rugby World Cup

Tournament details
- Host nations: New Zealand; Australia
- Venue: 11 (in 11 host cities)
- Dates: 22 May – 20 June (30 days)
- No. of nations: 16

Final positions
- Champions: New Zealand (1st title)
- Runner-up: France
- Third place: Wales

Tournament statistics
- Matches played: 32
- Attendance: 469,664 (14,677 per match)
- Top scorer(s): (New Zealand) Grant Fox (126)
- Most tries: (New Zealand) Craig Green (New Zealand) John Kirwan (6 tries each)

The 1987 Rugby World Cup was the first Rugby World Cup. It was co-hosted by New Zealand and Australia – New Zealand hosted 21 matches (17 pool stage matches, two quarter-finals, the third-place play-off and the final) while Australia hosted 11 matches (seven pool matches, two quarter-finals and both semi-finals). The tournament was won by New Zealand, who were the strong favourites and won all their matches comfortably. New Zealand defeated France 29–9 in the final at Eden Park in Auckland. The New Zealand team was captained by David Kirk and included such rugby greats as Sean Fitzpatrick, John Kirwan, Grant Fox and Michael Jones. Wales finished third, and Australia fourth, after conceding crucial tries in the dying seconds of both their semi-final against France and the third-place play-off against Wales.

Seven of the sixteen participating teams were the International Rugby Football Board (IRFB) members – New Zealand, Australia, England, Scotland, Ireland, Wales and France. South Africa was unable to compete because of the international sporting boycott due to apartheid. Invitations were given to Argentina, Fiji, Italy, Canada, Romania, Tonga, Japan, Zimbabwe and the United States. This left Western Samoa controversially excluded, despite their better playing standard than some of the teams invited. The USSR were to be invited but they declined the invitation on political grounds, allegedly due to the continued IRFB membership of South Africa. There was no qualification process for the tournament.

The tournament witnessed a number of one-sided matches, with the seven IRFB members proving too strong for the other teams. Half of the 24 matches across the four pools saw one team score 40 or more points. The tournament was seen as a major success and proved that the event was viable in the long term.

== Participating nations ==
The tournament comprised the seven members of the IRFB, and nine teams invited by the IRFB; there was no qualification process for teams.

| IRFB Member Nations | Invited Nations |
|---|---|
| England; France; Ireland; Australia; New Zealand; Scotland; Wales | Zimbabwe; Argentina; Canada; United States; Japan; Italy; Romania; Fiji; Tonga |

- South Africa was excluded due to its pro-apartheid policies.
- Soviet Union were to be invited but declined.

== Venues ==
Locations of the 1987 Rugby World Cup host cities

Of the 11 venues to host matches at the tournament, only two were in Australia.

| Country | Location | Stadium | Capacity (Note: As of 1987) |
|---|---|---|---|
| Australia | Brisbane | Ballymore Stadium | 24,000 |
| Australia | Sydney | Concord Oval | 20,000 |
| New Zealand | Auckland | Eden Park | 48,000 |
| New Zealand | Christchurch | Lancaster Park | 36,500 |
| New Zealand | Dunedin | Carisbrook | 35,000 |
| New Zealand | Hamilton | Rugby Park | 30,000 |
| New Zealand | Invercargill | Rugby Park Stadium | 30,000 |
| New Zealand | Napier | McLean Park | 30,000 |
| New Zealand | Palmerston North | Showgrounds Oval | 20,000 |
| New Zealand | Rotorua | Rotorua International Stadium | 35,000 |
| New Zealand | Wellington | Athletic Park | 39,000 |

== Referees ==
- (Australia) Kerry Fitzgerald
- (Australia) Bob Fordham
- (England) Fred Howard
- (England) Roger Quittenton
- (France) René Hourquet
- (France) Guy Maurette
- (Ireland) David Burnett
- (Ireland) Stephen Hilditch
- (New Zealand) Dave Bishop
- (New Zealand) Keith Lawrence
- (Scotland) Brian Anderson
- (Scotland) Jim Fleming
- (Wales) Derek Bevan
- (Wales) Clive Norling

== Pools and format ==
| Pool 1 | Pool 2 | Pool 3 | Pool 4 |
|---|---|---|---|
| Australia; England; Japan; United States | Canada; Ireland; Tonga; Wales | Argentina; Fiji; Italy; New Zealand | France; Romania; Scotland; Zimbabwe |

- Pool 1 was played in Australia
- Pool 2 was played with five matches held in New Zealand and one in Australia
- Pool 3 was played in New Zealand
- Pool 4 was played in New Zealand

The inaugural World Cup was contested by 16 nations. There was no qualifying tournament to determine the participants; instead, the 16 nations were invited by the International Rugby Football Board to compete. The simple 16-team pool/knock-out format was used with the teams divided into four pools of four, with each team playing the others in their pool once, for a total of three matches per team in the pool stage. Nations were awarded two points for a win, one for a draw and none for a loss: teams finishing level on points were separated by tries scored, rather than total points difference (had it been otherwise, Argentina would have taken second place in Group C ahead of Fiji, although France would still have won Group D.) The top two nations of every pool advanced to the quarter-finals. The runners-up of each pool faced the winners of a different pool in the quarter-finals. A standard single-elimination tournament followed, with the losers of the semi-finals contesting an additional play-off match to determine third place.

A total of 32 matches (24 in the pool stage and eight in the knock-out stage) were played in the tournament over 29 days from 22 May to 20 June 1987.

== Pool stage ==
=== Pool 1 ===
| Team | Pld | W | D | L | PF | PA | PD | T | Pts | Qualification |
|---|---|---|---|---|---|---|---|---|---|---|
| Australia | 3 | 3 | 0 | 0 | 108 | 41 | +67 | 18 | 6 | Knockout stage |
| England | 3 | 2 | 0 | 1 | 100 | 32 | +68 | 15 | 4 | Knockout stage |
| United States | 3 | 1 | 0 | 2 | 39 | 99 | −60 | 5 | 2 | |
| Japan | 3 | 0 | 0 | 3 | 48 | 123 | −75 | 7 | 0 | |

23 May 1987

| Australia | 19–6 | England |
| Try: Campese; Poidevin; Con: Lynagh; Pen: Lynagh (3) | Report | Try: Harrison; Con: Webb |

Concord Oval, Sydney
Attendance: 17,896
Referee: Keith Lawrence (New Zealand)

24 May 1987

| Japan | 18–21 | United States |
| Try: Taumoefolau (2); Yoshinaga; Pen: Yoshinaga; Kutsuki | Report | Try: Nelson; Purcell; Lambert; Con: Nelson (3); Pen: Nelson |

Ballymore, Brisbane
Attendance: 4,000
Referee: Guy Maurette (France)

30 May 1987

| England | 60–7 | Japan |
| Try: Harrison (3); Underwood (2); Salmon; Richards; Redman; Rees; Simms; Con: Webb (7); Pen: Webb (2) | Report | Try: Miyamoto; Pen: Matsuo |

Concord Oval, Sydney
Attendance: 4,893
Referee: René Hourquet (France)

31 May 1987

| Australia | 47–12 | United States |
| Try: Leeds (2) 43'; Penalty try Campese; Smith 24'; Slack 40'; Papworth; Codey; Con: Lynagh (6) 25', 41'; Pen: Lynagh 2' | Report | Try: Nelson 53'; Con: Nelson 54'; Pen: Nelson 32'; Drop: Horton 75' |

Ballymore, Brisbane
Attendance: 10,855
Referee: Brian Anderson (Scotland)

3 June 1987

| England | 34–6 | United States |
| Try: Winterbottom (2); Harrison; Dooley; Con: Webb (3); Pen: Webb (4) | Report | Try: Purcell; Con: Nelson |

Concord Oval, Sydney
Attendance: 8,785
Referee: Kerry Fitzgerald (Australia)

3 June 1987

| Australia | 42–23 | Japan |
| Try: Slack (2); Burke (2); Tuynman; Grigg; Hartill; Campese; Con: Lynagh (5) | Report | Try: Kutsuki (2); Fujita; Con: Okidoi; Pen: Okidoi (2); Drop: Okidoi |

Concord Oval, Sydney
Attendance: 8,785
Referee: Jim Fleming (Scotland)

=== Pool 2 ===
| Team | Pld | W | D | L | PF | PA | PD | T | Pts | Qualification |
|---|---|---|---|---|---|---|---|---|---|---|
| Wales | 3 | 3 | 0 | 0 | 82 | 31 | +51 | 13 | 6 | Knockout stage |
| Ireland | 3 | 2 | 0 | 1 | 84 | 41 | +43 | 11 | 4 | Knockout stage |
| Canada | 3 | 1 | 0 | 2 | 65 | 90 | −25 | 8 | 2 | |
| Tonga | 3 | 0 | 0 | 3 | 29 | 98 | −69 | 3 | 0 | |

24 May 1987

| Canada | 37–4 | Tonga |
| Try: Palmer (2); Vaesen (2); Stuart; Frame; Penalty try Con: Wyatt (2); Gareth Rees; Pen: Rees | Report | Try: Valu |

McLean Park, Napier
Attendance: 7,000
Referee: Clive Norling (Wales)

25 May 1987

| Ireland | 6–13 | Wales |
| Pen: Kiernan (2) | Report | Try: Ring; Pen: Thorburn; Drop: Davies (2) |

Athletic Park, Wellington
Attendance: 15,000
Referee: Kerry Fitzgerald (Australia)

29 May 1987

| Tonga | 16–29 | Wales |
| Try: Fielea; Fifita; Con: Liavaʻa; Pen: Liava'a; Amone | Report | Try: Webbe (3); Hadley; Con: Thorburn (2); Pen: Thorburn (2); Drop: Davies |

Showgrounds Oval, Palmerston North
Attendance: 19,000
Referee: Dave Bishop (New Zealand)

30 May 1987

| Canada | 19–46 | Ireland |
| Try: Cardinal; Pen: Rees (3); Wyatt; Drop: Rees | Report | Try: Crossan (2); Bradley; Spillane; Ringland; MacNeill; Con: Kiernan (5); Pen: Kiernan (2); Drop: Ward; Kiernan |

Carisbrook, Dunedin
Attendance: 9,000
Referee: Fred Howard (England)

3 June 1987

| Canada | 9–40 | Wales |
| Pen: Rees (3) | Report | Try: Evans (4); Devereux; Bowen; Hadley; Phillips; Con: Thorburn (4) |

Rugby Park, Invercargill
Attendance: 14,000
Referee: Dave Bishop (New Zealand)

3 June 1987

| Ireland | 32–9 | Tonga |
| Try: Mullin (3); MacNeill (2); Con: Ward (3); Pen: Ward (2) | Report | Pen: Amone (3) |

Ballymore, Brisbane
Attendance: 4,000
Referee: Guy Maurette (France)

=== Pool 3 ===
| Team | Pld | W | D | L | PF | PA | PD | T | Pts | Qualification |
|---|---|---|---|---|---|---|---|---|---|---|
| New Zealand | 3 | 3 | 0 | 0 | 190 | 34 | +156 | 30 | 6 | Knockout stage |
| Fiji | 3 | 1 | 0 | 2 | 56 | 101 | −45 | 6 | 2 (Note: Fiji qualified for the highest number of tries (Fiji 6, Italy 5, Argentina 4)) | Knockout stage |
| Italy | 3 | 1 | 0 | 2 | 40 | 110 | −70 | 5 | 2 | |
| Argentina | 3 | 1 | 0 | 2 | 49 | 90 | −41 | 4 | 2 | |

Notes:

22 May 1987

| New Zealand | 70–6 | Italy |
| Try: Kirwan (2); Kirk (2); Green (2); Penalty try Jones; Taylor; McDowell; Stanley; Whetton; Con: Fox (8); Pen: Fox (2) | Report | Pen: Collodo; Drop: Collodo |

Eden Park, Auckland
Attendance: 20,000
Referee: Bob Fordham (Australia)

24 May 1987

| Argentina | 9–28 | Fiji |
| Try: Penalty try Con: Porta; Pen: Porta | Report | Try: Gale; Naivilawasa; Nalaga; Savai; Con: Koroduadua (2); Rokowailoa; Pen: Koroduadua (2) |

Rugby Park, Hamilton
Attendance: 13,000
Referee: Jim Fleming (Scotland)

27 May 1987

| New Zealand | 74–13 | Fiji |
| Try: Gallagher (4); Green (4); Kirk; Kirwan; Penalty try Whetton; Con: Fox (10); Pen: Fox (2) | Report | Try: Cama; Pen: Koroduadua (3) |

Lancaster Park, Christchurch
Attendance: 25,000
Referee: Derek Bevan (Wales)

28 May 1987

| Argentina | 25–16 | Italy |
| Try: Lanza; Gómez; Con: Porta; Pen: Porta (5) | Report | Try: Innocenti; Cuttitta; Con: Collodo; Pen: Collodo (2) |

Lancaster Park, Christchurch
Attendance: 2,000
Referee: Roger Quittenton (England)

31 May 1987

| Fiji | 15–18 | Italy |
| Try: Naivilawasa; Con: Koroduadua; Pen: Koroduadua (2); Drop: Qoro | | Try: Cuttitta; Cucchiella; Mascioletti; Pen: Collodo; Drop: Collodo |

Carisbrook, Dunedin
Attendance: 13,000
Referee: Keith Lawrence (New Zealand)

1 June 1987

| New Zealand | 46–15 | Argentina |
| Try: Kirk; Brooke; Stanley; Earl; Crowley; Whetton; Con: Fox (2); Pen: Fox (6) | | Try: Lanza; Con: Porta; Pen: Porta (3) |

Athletic Park, Wellington
Attendance: 30,000
Referee: Roger Quittenton (England)

=== Pool 4 ===
| Team | Pld | W | D | L | PF | PA | PD | T | Pts | Qualification |
|---|---|---|---|---|---|---|---|---|---|---|
| France | 3 | 2 | 1 | 0 | 145 | 44 | +101 | 25 | 5 (Note: France qualify as pool winner having scored three tries to Scotland's two in their drawn match.) | Knockout stage |
| Scotland | 3 | 2 | 1 | 0 | 135 | 69 | +66 | 22 | 5 | Knockout stage |
| Romania | 3 | 1 | 0 | 2 | 61 | 130 | −69 | 6 | 2 | |
| Zimbabwe | 3 | 0 | 0 | 3 | 53 | 151 | −98 | 5 | 0 | |

Notes:

23 May 1987

| Romania | 21–20 | Zimbabwe |
| Try: Paraschiv; Toader; Hodorcă; Pen: A. Dumitru (3) | | Try: Tsimba (2); Neill; Con: Ferreira; Pen: Ferreira (2) |

Eden Park, Auckland
Attendance: 4,500
Referee: Stephen Hilditch (Ireland)

23 May 1987

| France | 20–20 | Scotland |
| Try: Sella; Berbizier; Blanco; Con: Blanco; Pen: Blanco (2) | | Try: White; Duncan; Pen: Hastings (4) |

Lancaster Park, Christchurch
Attendance: 18,000
Referee: Fred Howard (England)

28 May 1987

| France | 55–12 | Romania |
| Try: Lagisquet (2); Charvet (2); Sella; Andrieu; Camberabero; Erbani; Laporte; Con: Laporte (8); Pen: Laporte | | Pen: Bezuscu (4) |

Athletic Park, Wellington
Attendance: 7,000
Referee: Bob Fordham (Australia)

30 May 1987

| Scotland | 60–21 | Zimbabwe |
| Try: Tait (2); Tukalo (2); Duncan (2); Paxton (2); Oliver; Hastings; Jeffrey; Con: Hastings (8) | | Try: Buitendag; Con: Grobler; Pen: Grobler (5) |

Athletic Park, Wellington
Attendance: 12,000
Referee: David Burnett (Ireland)

2 June 1987

| Romania | 28–55 | Scotland |
| Try: Murariu (2); Toader; Con: A. Dumitru; Ion; Pen: A. Dumitru (3); Ion | | Try: Jeffrey (3); Tait (2); Hastings (2); Duncan; Tukalo; Con: Hastings (8); Pen: Hastings |

Carisbrook, Dunedin
Attendance: 14,000
Referee: Stephen Hilditch (Ireland)

2 June 1987

| France | 70–12 | Zimbabwe |
| Try: Modin (3); Camberabero (3); Charvet (2); Rodriguez (2); Dubroca; Estève; Laporte; Con: Camberabero (9) | | Try: Kaulback; Con: Grobler; Pen: Grobler (2) |

Eden Park, Auckland
Attendance: 3,000
Referee: Derek Bevan (Wales)

== Knockout stage ==
Quarter-finals
6 June – Christchurch
New Zealand | 30
Scotland | 3
8 June – Brisbane
Wales | 16
England | 3
7 June – Auckland
France | 31
Fiji | 16
7 June – Sydney
Australia | 33
Ireland | 15

Semi-finals
14 June – Brisbane
New Zealand | 49
Wales | 6
13 June – Sydney
France | 30
Australia | 24

Final
20 June – Auckland
New Zealand | 29
France | 9
Third place
18 June – Rotorua
Wales | 22
Australia | 21

=== Quarter-finals ===
6 June 1987

| New Zealand | 30–3 | Scotland |
| Try: Whetton; Gallagher; Con: Fox (2); Pen: Fox (6) | | Pen: Hastings |

Lancaster Park, Christchurch
Attendance: 30,000
Referee: David Burnett (Ireland)

7 June 1987

| Australia | 33–15 | Ireland |
| Try: Burke (2); McIntyre; Smith; Con: Lynagh (4); Pen: Lynagh (3) | | Try: MacNeill; Kiernan; Con: Kiernan (2); Pen: Kiernan |

Concord Oval, Sydney
Attendance: 14,356
Referee: Brian Anderson (Scotland)

7 June 1987

| Fiji | 16–31 | France |
| Try: Qoro; Damu; Con: Koroduadua; Pen: Koroduadua (2) | | Try: Rodriguez (2); Lorieux; Lagisquet; Con: Laporte (3); Pen: Laporte (2); Drop: Laporte |

Eden Park, Auckland
Attendance: 17,000
Referee: Clive Norling (Wales)

8 June 1987

| England | 3–16 | Wales |
| Pen: Webb | | Try: Roberts; Jones; Devereux; Con: Thorburn (2) |

Ballymore, Brisbane
Attendance: 15,000
Referee: René Hourquet (France)

=== Semi-finals ===
13 June 1987

| Australia | 24–30 | France |
| Try: Campese; Codey; Con: Lynagh (2); Pen: Lynagh (3); Drop: Lynagh | Report | Try: Lorieux; Sella; Lagisquet; Blanco; Con: Camberabero (4); Pen: Camberabero (2) |

Concord Oval, Sydney
Attendance: 17,768
Referee: Brian Anderson (Scotland)

14 June 1987

| New Zealand | 49–6 | Wales |
| Try: Kirwan (2); Shelford (2); Drake; Whetton; Stanley; Brooke-Cowden; Con: Fox (7); Pen: Fox | Report | Try: Devereux; Con: Thorburn |

Ballymore, Brisbane
Attendance: 22,576
Referee: Kerry Fitzgerald (Australia)

=== Third-place play-off ===
18 June 1987

| Australia | 21–22 | Wales |
| Try: Burke; Grigg; Con: Lynagh (2); Pen: Lynagh (2); Drop: Lynagh | Report | Try: Roberts; Moriarty; Hadley; Con: Thorburn (2); Pen: Thorburn (2) |

Rotorua International Stadium, Rotorua
Attendance: 29,000
Referee: Fred Howard (England)

=== Final ===
20 June 1987

| New Zealand | 29–9 | France |
| Try: Jones; Kirk; Kirwan; Con: Fox; Pen: Fox (4); Drop: Fox | Report | Try: Berbizier; Con: Camberabero; Pen: Camberabero |

Eden Park, Auckland
Attendance: 48,035
Referee: Kerry Fitzgerald (Australia)

== Statistics ==
The tournament's top point scorer was New Zealand's Grant Fox, who scored 126 points. Craig Green and John Kirwan scored the most tries, six in total.

Top 10 point scorers
| Player | Team | Position | Played | Tries | Conversions | Penalties | Drop goals | Total points |
|---|---|---|---|---|---|---|---|---|
| Grant Fox | New Zealand | Fly-half | 6 | 0 | 30 | 21 | 1 | 126 |
| Michael Lynagh | Australia | Fly-half | 6 | 0 | 20 | 12 | 2 | 82 |
| Gavin Hastings | Scotland | Fullback | 4 | 3 | 16 | 6 | 0 | 62 |
| Didier Camberabero | France | Fly-half | 5 | 4 | 14 | 3 | 0 | 53 |
| Jonathan Webb | England | Fullback | 4 | 0 | 11 | 7 | 0 | 43 |
| Guy Laporte | France | Fly-half | 3 | 2 | 11 | 3 | 1 | 42 |
| Paul Thorburn | Wales | Fullback | 6 | 0 | 11 | 5 | 0 | 37 |
| Mike Kiernan | Ireland | Centre | 3 | 1 | 7 | 5 | 1 | 36 |
| Severo Koroduadua | Fiji | Fullback | 4 | 0 | 4 | 9 | 0 | 35 |
| Hugo Porta | Argentina | Fly-half | 3 | 0 | 3 | 9 | 0 | 33 |

== Broadcasters ==
The event was broadcast in Australia by ABC and by TVNZ in New Zealand as host broadcasters supplying their pictures to broadcasters around the world and in the United Kingdom by the BBC and in Ireland by RTÉ.
