= 1987 Rugby World Cup Pool 1 =

Pool 1 of the 1987 Rugby World Cup began on 23 May and was completed on 3 June. The pool was composed of Australia, England, United States and Japan.

== Standings ==
Team	Pld	W	D	L	PF	PA	PD	T	Pts	Qualification
Australia	3	3	0	0	108	41	+67	18	6	Knockout stage
England	3	2	0	1	100	32	+68	15	4	Knockout stage
United States	3	1	0	2	39	99	−60	5	2	
Japan	3	0	0	3	48	123	−75	7	0	

== Australia vs England ==
23 May 1987

Australia	19–6	England
Try: Campese; Poidevin; Con: Lynagh; Pen: Lynagh (3)	Report	Try: Harrison; Con: Webb

Concord Oval, Sydney
Attendance: 17,896
Referee: Keith Lawrence (New Zealand)

Australia	England

FB	15	Roger Gould	(substituted off) 78'
RW	14	Peter Grigg
OC	13	Andrew Slack (c)
IC	12	Brett Papworth
LW	11	David Campese
FH	10	Michael Lynagh
SH	9	Nick Farr-Jones
N8	8	Troy Coker
OF	7	Steve Tuynman
BF	6	Simon Poidevin
RL	5	William Campbell
LL	4	Steve Cutler
TP	3	Andy McIntyre
HK	2	Tom Lawton
LP	1	Enrique Rodríguez
Replacements:
WG	16	Matt Burke
FH	17	Steve James	(substituted in) 78'
SH	18	Brian Smith
FL	19	David Codey
PR	20	Cameron Lillicrap
HK	21	Mark McBain
Coach:
(Australia) Alan Jones

FB	15	Marcus Rose	(substituted off) 3'
RW	14	Mike Harrison (c)
OC	13	Kevin Simms
IC	12	Jamie Salmon
LW	11	Rory Underwood
FH	10	Peter Williams
SH	9	Richard Harding
N8	8	Dean Richards
OF	7	Gary Rees
BF	6	Peter Winterbottom
RL	5	Nigel Redman
LL	4	Wade Dooley
TP	3	Gary Pearce
HK	2	Brian Moore
LP	1	Paul Rendall
Replacements:
FB	16	Jonathan Webb	(substituted in) 3'
FH	17	Rob Andrew
SH	18	Richard Hill
N8	19	David Egerton
HK	20	Graham Dawe
PR	21	Gareth Chilcott
Coach:
(England) Martin Green

== Japan vs United States ==
24 May 1987

Japan	18–21	United States
Try: Taumoefolau (2); Yoshinaga; Pen: Yoshinaga; Kutsuki	Report	Try: Nelson; Purcell; Lambert; Con: Nelson (3); Pen: Nelson

Ballymore, Brisbane
Attendance: 4,000
Referee: Guy Maurette (France)

Japan	United States

FB	15	Shogo Mukai
RW	14	Nofomuli Taumoefolau
OC	13	Kojiro Yoshinaga
IC	12	Eiji Kutsuki
LW	11	Shinji Onuki
FH	10	Seiji Hirao
SH	9	Hisataka Ikuta
N8	8	Michihito Chida
OF	7	Sinali Latu
BF	6	Katsufumi Miyamoto
RL	5	Atsushi Oyagi
LL	4	Toshiyuki Hayashi (c)
TP	3	Koji Horaguchi
HK	2	Tsuyoshi Fujita
LP	1	Koji Yasumi
Replacements:
HK	16	Tsutomu Hirose
PR	17	Toshitaka Kimura
LK	18	Seiji Kurihara
SH	19	Mitsutake Hagimoto
FH	20	Katsuhiro Matsuo
FB	21	Daijiro Murai
Coach:
(Japan) Katsumi Miyaji

FB	15	Ray Nelson
RW	14	Mike Purcell
OC	13	Kevin Higgins
IC	12	Roy Helu
LW	11	Gary Hein
FH	10	Joe Clarkson
SH	9	Mike Saunders
N8	8	Brian Vizard
OF	7	Gary Lambert
BF	6	Blane Warhurst
RL	5	Ed Burlingham (c)
LL	4	Kevin Swords
TP	3	Fred Paoli
HK	2	John Everett
LP	1	Rick Bailey
Replacements:
FH	16	Mike Caulder
FH	17	Dave Horton
SH	18	Dave Dickson
N8	19	Tony Ridnell
PR	20	Neal Brendel
HK	21	Pat Johnson
Coach:
(Republic of Ireland) George Hook/ (United States) Ron Mayes

== England vs Japan ==
30 May 1987

England	60–7	Japan
Try: Harrison (3); Underwood (2); Salmon; Richards; Redman; Rees; Simms; Con: Webb (7); Pen: Webb (2)	Report	Try: Miyamoto; Pen: Matsuo

Concord Oval, Sydney
Attendance: 4,893
Referee: René Hourquet (France)

England	Japan

FB	15	Jonathan Webb
RW	14	Mike Harrison (c) (substituted off) 77'
OC	13	Kevin Simms	(substituted off) 68'
IC	12	Jamie Salmon
LW	11	Rory Underwood
FH	10	Peter Williams
SH	9	Richard Harding
N8	8	Dean Richards
OF	7	Gary Rees
BF	6	Peter Winterbottom
RL	5	Steve Bainbridge
LL	4	Nigel Redman
TP	3	Gareth Chilcott
HK	2	Brian Moore
LP	1	Paul Rendall
Replacements:
CE	16	Fran Clough	(substituted in) 68'
FH	17	Rob Andrew	(substituted in) 77'
SH	18	Richard Hill
FL	19	Mickey Skinner
HK	20	Graham Dawe
PR	21	Gary Pearce
Coach:
(England) Martin Green

FB	15	Daijiro Murai
RW	14	Nofomuli Taumoefolau
OC	13	Katsuhiro Matsuo
IC	12	Eiji Kutsuki
LW	11	Shinji Onuki
FH	10	Seiji Hirao
SH	9	Mitsutake Hagimoto
N8	8	Michihito Chida
OF	7	Toshiyuki Hayashi (c)
BF	6	Katsufumi Miyamoto
RL	5	Seiji Kurihara
LL	4	Atsushi Oyagi
TP	3	Koji Horaguchi
HK	2	Tsuyoshi Fujita
LP	1	Toshitaka Kimura
Replacements:
HK	16	Tsutomu Hirose
PR	17	Masaharu Aizawa
FL	18	Yasuharu Kawase
SH	19	Hisataka Ikuta
CE	20	Kojiro Yoshinaga
FB	21	Shogo Mukai
Coach:
(Japan) Katsumi Miyaji

== Australia vs United States ==
31 May 1987

Australia	47–12	United States
Try: Leeds (2) 43'; Penalty try Campese; Smith 24'; Slack 40'; Papworth; Codey; Con: Lynagh (6) 25', 41'; Pen: Lynagh 2'	Report	Try: Nelson 53'; Con: Nelson 54'; Pen: Nelson 32'; Drop: Horton 75'

Ballymore, Brisbane
Attendance: 10,855
Referee: Brian Anderson (Scotland)

Australia	United States

FB	15	Andrew Leeds
RW	14	David Campese
OC	13	Andrew Slack (c)
IC	12	Brett Papworth
LW	11	Matt Burke
FH	10	Michael Lynagh
SH	9	Brian Smith
N8	8	Troy Coker
OF	7	Steve Tuynman
BF	6	Simon Poidevin
RL	5	William Campbell
LL	4	Steve Cutler
TP	3	Andy McIntyre
HK	2	Tom Lawton
LP	1	Cameron Lillicrap
Replacements:
CE	16	Michael Cook
FH	17	Steve James	(substituted in) 78'
SH	18	Nick Farr-Jones
FL	19	Ross Reynolds
PR	20	Mark Hartill
HK	21	Mark McBain
Coach:
(Australia) Alan Jones

FB	15	Ray Nelson	(substituted off) 35'
RW	14	Mike Purcell
OC	13	Kevin Higgins
IC	12	Roy Helu
LW	11	Gary Hein
FH	10	Dave Horton
SH	9	Dave Dickson	(substituted off) 78'
N8	8	Brian Vizard
OF	7	Steve Finkel
BF	6	Tony Ridnell
RL	5	Bill Shiflet	(substituted off) 24'
LL	4	Kevin Swords
TP	3	Fred Paoli (c)
HK	2	Pat Johnson
LP	1	Rick Bailey
Replacements:
FH	16	Joe Clarkson
CE	17	Denis Shanagher
SH	18	Mike Saunders	(substituted in) 35'
N8	19	Gary Lambert	(substituted in) 24'
PR	20	Neal Brendel
HK	21	John Everett
Coach:
(Republic of Ireland) George Hook/ (United States) Ron Mayes

== England vs United States ==
3 June 1987

England	34–6	United States
Try: Winterbottom (2); Harrison; Dooley; Con: Webb (3); Pen: Webb (4)	Report	Try: Purcell; Con: Nelson

Concord Oval, Sydney
Attendance: 8,785
Referee: Kerry Fitzgerald (Australia)

England	United States

FB	15	Jonathan Webb
RW	14	Mike Harrison (c)
OC	13	Fran Clough
IC	12	Jamie Salmon
LW	11	Mark Bailey
FH	10	Rob Andrew
SH	9	Richard Hill
N8	8	Dean Richards
OF	7	Gary Rees
BF	6	Peter Winterbottom
RL	5	Steve Bainbridge
LL	4	Wade Dooley
TP	3	Gary Pearce
HK	2	Graham Dawe
LP	1	Gareth Chilcott
Replacements:
FH	16	Huw Davies
SH	17	Richard Harding
WG	18	Rory Underwood
N8	19	David Egerton
HK	20	Brian Moore
PR	21	Paul Rendall
Coach:
(England) Martin Green

FB	15	Ray Nelson
RW	14	Mike Purcell
OC	13	Kevin Higgins
IC	12	Tommy Vinick
LW	11	Gary Hein
FH	10	Joe Clarkson
SH	9	Mike Saunders
N8	8	Brian Vizard
OF	7	Steve Finkel
BF	6	Gary Lambert
RL	5	Ed Burlingham (c)
LL	4	Bob Causey
TP	3	Neal Brendel
HK	2	John Everett
LP	1	Rick Bailey
Replacements:
SH	16	John Mickel
CE	18	Denis Shanagher
N8	19	Fred Paoli
HK	20	Pat Johnson
N8	21	Tony Ridnell
Coach:
(Republic of Ireland) George Hook/ (United States) Ron Mayes

== Australia vs Japan ==
3 June 1987

Australia	42–23	Japan
Try: Slack (2); Burke (2); Tuynman; Grigg; Hartill; Campese; Con: Lynagh (5)	Report	Try: Kutsuki (2); Fujita; Con: Okidoi; Pen: Okidoi (2); Drop: Okidoi

Concord Oval, Sydney
Attendance: 8,785
Referee: Jim Fleming (Scotland)

Australia	Japan

FB	15	Roger Gould
RW	14	Peter Grigg
OC	13	Andrew Slack
IC	12	Michael Cook	(substituted off) 17'
LW	11	David Campese
FH	10	Michael Lynagh
SH	9	Brian Smith
N8	8	Troy Coker	(substituted off) 69'
OF	7	David Codey
BF	6	Simon Poidevin (c)
RL	5	Ross Reynolds
LL	4	Steve Cutler
TP	3	Mark Hartill
HK	2	Mark McBain
LP	1	Enrique Rodríguez
Replacements:
SH	16	Nick Farr-Jones
FB	17	Andrew Leeds
CE	18	Brett Papworth	(substituted in) 17'
HK	19	Tom Lawton
PR	20	Cameron Lillicrap
LK	21	William Alexander Campbell	(substituted in) 69'
Coach:
(Australia) Alan Jones

FB	15	Shogo Mukai
RW	14	Nofomuli Taumoefolau
OC	13	Kojiro Yoshinaga
IC	12	Eiji Kutsuki
LW	11	Minoru Okidoi
FH	10	Seiji Hirao
SH	9	Hisataka Ikuta
N8	8	Sinali Latu
OF	7	Yasuharu Kawase
BF	6	Katsufumi Miyamoto
RL	5	Toshiyuki Hayashi (c)
LL	4	Yoshihiko Sakuraba
TP	3	Koji Horaguchi
HK	2	Tsuyoshi Fujita
LP	1	Toshitaka Kimura
Replacements:
PR	16	Koji Yasumi
HK	17	Tsutomu Hirose
LK	18	Seiji Kurihara
SH	19	Mitsutake Hagimoto
FH	20	Katsuhiro Matsuo
WG	21	Toshiro Yoshino
Coach:
(Japan) Katsumi Miyaji
