= USA Rugby =

National governing body for the sport of rugby union in the United States

- Sport: Rugby union
- Founded: 1975; 51 years ago
- World Rugby affiliation: 1987
- RAN affiliation: 2001
- Headquarters: Glendale, Colorado
- Chairman: Tom Cusack
- Website: usa.rugby

USA Rugby (formally the United States of America Rugby Football Union, Ltd.) is the national governing body for the sport of rugby union in the United States. Its role is to achieve and maintain "high levels of quality in all aspects of rugby." USA Rugby is responsible for the promotion and development of the sport in the U.S., and promotion of U.S. international participation.

USA Rugby was founded in 1975 as the United States of America Rugby Football Union, and it organized the first U.S. national team match in 1976. Today, USA Rugby has over 130,000 members, the largest segment being college rugby with over 32,000 members. USA Rugby oversees 1,200 high school teams, 900 college teams, 700 senior club teams, and 400 youth teams. It administers all United States national teams: senior men's and women's teams, sevens teams for both men and women, and under-20 national teams for both sexes. The organization also sponsors college rugby for both sexes, although since the 2010–11 academic year the NCAA has designated women's rugby an emerging varsity sport.

USA Rugby is governed by an 11-member Board of Directors and four National Councils across Youth & High School, college, Senior Club and International Athlete, and its CEO is Bill Goren. It is a member of World Rugby through membership with Rugby Americas North, and a member of the United States Olympic Committee. The headquarters for USA Rugby is located in Glendale, Colorado.

== History ==
The U.S. men's national team, the Eagles, won the gold medal in Olympic rugby in 1920 and 1924. After that time, rugby in the U.S. stagnated while continuing to grow in other parts of the world.

Beginning in the 1960s and continuing through the 1970s, the sport of rugby union enjoyed a renaissance in the US. This created the need for a national governing body to represent the United States. On June 7, 1975, four territorial organizations (Pacific Coast, West, Midwest, and East) gathered in Chicago, Illinois, and formed the United States of America Rugby Football Union (now known as USA Rugby). USA Rugby then fielded its first national team on January 31, 1976, in a match against Australia in Anaheim, California, which Australia won, 24–12.

In 1993, the Southern California RFU, a local area union of the Pacific Coast RFU, applied to become a separate territory. This was an impetus for others around the country to do the same, changing the make-up of USA Rugby, which now has seven territories (Pacific, Southern California, West, Midwest, South, Northeastern, and Mid-Atlantic).

USA Rugby lobbied for several years for participation in the IRB Sevens World Series. It was finally awarded the annual USA Sevens tournament, beginning in 2004 with Los Angeles as the venue for the initial USA Sevens tournaments. In summer 2006, the tournament was moved to Petco Park in San Diego. Since 2010, the tournament has been held every year at Sam Boyd Stadium in Las Vegas Valley and has been broadcast live on NBC.

USA Rugby is a Founding Sports Partner of the Sports Museum of America, joining more than 50 other single-sport Halls of Fame, national governing bodies, museums, and other organizations across North America, to celebrate the history, grandeur, and significance of sports in American culture. Opened in New York City on May 7, 2008, the Sports Museum of America showcases USA Rugby in its Hall of Halls Gallery, in return for their support of the creation of the nation's first all-sports museum experience.

In 2014, USA Rugby created Rugby International Marketing, a for-profit company that is responsible for promoting the sport of rugby.

=== Recent achievements ===
- In the 2009–10 Sevens World Series, the men's sevens team finished the season ranked 10th in the world, their highest ranking to date at that time.
- In 2010, USA Rugby became an Olympic Sport member of the United States Olympic Committee (USOC).
- In 2011, the International Rugby Board, now known as World Rugby, gave its Development Award to USA Rugby for its Rookie Rugby program that introduced over 100,000 new children to youth rugby.
- In 2014:

- the U.S. Women's Sevens finished 4th in the World Rugby Women's Sevens World Series, their highest finish to date.
- the U.S. vs New Zealand match sold out Soldier Field in Chicago, drawing over 60,000 fans and setting a U.S. attendance record.

- In 2015:

- USA Rugby won the bid to host the 2018 Rugby World Cup Sevens in the San Francisco Bay Area.
- the U.S. Men's Sevens team finished sixth in the 2014–15 Sevens World Series, including first at the 2015 London Sevens. The team also defeated Canada 21–5 to win the 2015 NACRA Sevens and qualify for the 2016 Summer Olympics.

- In 2017:

- the Women's U.S. National Team finished 4th at the Women's Rugby World Cup in Ireland. Their second highest finish since winning the 1991 tournament.
- the U.S. Men's Sevens team finished fifth in the 2016-17 World Rugby Sevens Series, their highest-ever finish at the time.

- In 2018:

- the U.S. Men's National Team won the America's Rugby Championship (ARC) for the second consecutive year.
- the United States hosted its first ever Rugby World Cup event with the Rugby World Cup Sevens 2018 in San Francisco at AT&T Park. The event welcomed more than 100,000 in attendance, setting the mark for highest attended Rugby World Cup Sevens to date.

- In 2019:
  - U.S. Men's Sevens team finished second in the 2018–19 World Rugby Sevens Series, their highest-ever finish. The team would make five Cup finals including a win in the 2019 USA Sevens against Samoa.
- In October 2021, the U.S. vs New Zealand (All Blacks) match at FedEx Field in Washington DC. The final score was 104–14 to the All Blacks.
- the U.S. Women's Sevens team finished third at the 2024 Summer Olympics

== Governance and leadership ==
USA Rugby is governed by its board of directors and its congress. The board is composed of 12 members: 5 independent directors, 4 international athletes, and 3 representatives from USA Rugby's National Councils across Youth, college, and Adult Club. Board members as of 2026 were:

- Tom Cusack (Chairperson)
- Steve Argeris (Vice Chair)
- Koma Gandy-Fischbein (Affiliate Director)
- Tom Kelley (Independent Director)
- Julie Uhrman (Independent Director)
- Victoria Folayan (International Athlete)
- Jamie Burke (International Athlete)
- Denis Shanagher (International Athlete)
- Brett Thompson (International Athlete)
- Paul Keeler (Collegiate Representative)
- Rick Humm (Senior Club Representative)
- Bill Stevens (Youth & High School)

Scott Lawrence began his tenure as head coach of the Men's Eagles in January 2024. Zack Test is the head coach of the Men's Eagle Sevens. Jack Hanratty was appointed as the Women's Eagles head coach in December 2025. Emilie Bydwell is the head coach of the Women's Eagles Sevens, who ranked 2nd in the world through the 2018-19 Women's World Rugby Sevens Series.

== International representation ==
USA Rugby became a member of the International Rugby Football Board in 1987. The worldwide body would become the International Rugby Board (IRB) in 1998 and World Rugby in 2014. USA Rugby does not hold a vote on WR's 28-member Executive Council—the majority of votes are held by the 8 founding nations—although NACRA members collectively hold one vote on the Executive Council. In December 2011, for the first time, USA Rugby placed a representative on the 10-man executive committee. Bob Latham, in his role as chair of Rugby Americas North (RAN; known as NACRA before 2016), represents RAN on the executive committee.

USA Rugby also has relationships with international multi-sport organizations. USA Rugby is a member of the U.S. Olympic Committee and interacts with the International Olympic Committee. USA Rugby also interacts with the Pan American Sport Organization, and rugby has been a sport at the Pan Am Games since 2011.

== Financials ==
USA Rugby generally earns between $8 million to $16 million in annual revenues, with the majority of the revenue coming from: (1) membership dues, (2) event revenue, (3) grants, and (4) sponsorship. Their principal expenses are: (1) High Performance, (2) Men's National Team, and (3) Marketing and Fundraising. In 2010, USA Rugby paid over $200,000 each to its CEO Nigel Melville and its then head coach Eddie O'Sullivan. As of 2012, Nigel Melville's compensation was $250,000. USA Rugby experienced a financial crunch in 2016–17, due to the bankruptcy of kit sponsor BLK and currency exchange rates that affect grants received from World Rugby.

USA Rugby lost more than $4.4 million in 2017, and $4.2 million in 2018. Most of the losses were attributed to USA Rugby Partners, formerly known as Rugby International Marketing (RIM), which was the majority owner of The Rugby Channel which was sold in 2018 to FloSports. In early 2020, during the COVID-19 pandemic, USA Rugby filed for Chapter 11 bankruptcy to develop a financial restructuring plan. USA finished the Chapter 11 bankruptcy process as the Delaware Bankruptcy Court approved USA Rugby's debtor plan and the sport's National Governing Body. On September 1, 2020, USA Rugby was reorganized and started paying back creditors.

USA Rugby annual revenues are below, along with the components that generated the majority of revenue:

Year	Total Revenue	Member dues	Grants	Sponsors	Event revenue	Liabilities	Change in net assets	International comparisons (annual reported revenue)
2024	$16.6m	$3.1m	$7.3m	$1.6m	$0.1m	$15.8m	$0.8m	
2023	$16.0m	$2.6m	$7.4m	$1.5m	$0.2m	$14.5m	$1.5m	
2022	$12.4m	$2.2m	$5.6m	$0.6m	$0.4m	$13.0m	($0.7m)	
2021	$10.3m	$1.9m	$5.0m	$0.5m	$1.1m	$10.1m	$0.2m	
2020	$13.1m	$3.0m	$1.8m	$1.3m	$0.1m	$6.6m	$6.5m	
2019	$13.4m	$5.2m	$5.1m	$1.6m	$1.0m	$15.3m	($1.9m)	England - £213.2m
2018	$27.4m	$5.2m	$2.8m	$1.9m	$2.8m	$25.6m	($2.0m)	Scotland - £57.2m
2017	$14.0m	$5.0m	$2.0m	$1.9m	$2.1m			
2016	$14.7m	$4.8m	$2.0m	$2.3m	$2.7m			Scotland - £47.3m, Ireland - €76m/£67m, Wales - £73.3m
2015	$14.6m	$4.7m	$2.4m	$2.5m	$2.1m			Wales - £64m; Scotland - £44m.
2014	$16.4m	$4.5m	$2.0m	$2.2m	$5.4m			Wales - £58m, Scotland - £44m.
2013	$12.2m	$4.3m	$1.7m	$1.9m	$1.8m			Wales - £61m, New Zealand - £54m, Scotland - £39m.
2012	$10.2m	$4.3m	$1.7m	$1.6m	$1.1m			Scotland - £38m.
2011	$7.5m	$3.2m	$1.7m	$1.5m	$0.2m			Scotland - £35m; Canada - C$9m.
2010	$6.4m	$2.8m	$1.4m	$1.0m	$0.2m			Scotland - £34m
2009	$8.1m	$2.7m	$1.3m	$2.4m	$0.8m			
2008	$8.0m	$2.0m	$1.4m	$2.7m	$0.9m			
2007	$6.7m	$2.2m	$1.7m	$0.9m	$1.0m			
2006	$5.3m	$2.0m	$1.3m	$0.2m	$0.7m			

Notes:

- Grants come mainly from World Rugby and from the United States Olympic Committee.

=== Board performance ===
In a February 2017 assembly, Board Chair Will Chang called for a vote of confidence in the board from USA Rugby's Congress, which passed by a vote of 43–1. Steve Lewis, the sole Congress member who voted no confidence in the board, cited three issues — RIM's performance, the sanctioning of the PRO Rugby competition, and overspending by the high performance department. With RIM's financial performance continuing to deteriorate, in August 2017, Lewis proposed what was effectively a vote of no confidence in the board, this time getting seven votes and a similar number of abstentions. RIM's product "The Rugby Channel", which was supposed to be a money maker for USA Rugby, finished 2017 with $4.2 million in losses for the year.

=== Bankruptcy ===
On March 31, 2020, the board of USA Rugby voted to file for Chapter 11 bankruptcy as a result of "insurmountable financial constraints" in the wake of the coronavirus pandemic crisis. On August 31, 2020, the Delaware Bankruptcy Court approved USA Rugby's plan to reimburse its bankruptcy debts owed to creditors over five years effective the following day, allowing the governing body to exit bankruptcy and enter the post-bankruptcy phase.

== National teams: The Eagles ==
USA Rugby is responsible for organizing the various US national teams:

=== Men's teams ===
- U.S. national rugby union team — (Men's Eagles) competes annually every August/September in the Pacific Nations Cup, hosts matches during the June internationals, and usually travels to Europe to play in the November internationals. The team also competes every four years at the Rugby World Cup.
- U.S. national rugby sevens team — (Men's Eagles Sevens) competes annually in the World Rugby Sevens Series, a 7-tournament series that runs from November through May each year. The national sevens team also competes every four years in the Pan American Games, the Rugby Sevens World Cup, and in qualifying for the Summer Olympics.
- U.S. national under-20 rugby union team — competes annually to qualify for either the World Rugby Under 20 Championship or the World Rugby Under 20 Trophy.

=== Women's teams ===
- U.S. women's national rugby union team — (Women's Eagles) competes every year in the Pacific Four Series and WXV competitions. The Women's Eagles also compete every four years in the Women's Rugby World Cup. The national women's team had early success in the World Cup, reaching the finals in each of the first three tournaments (1991, 1994, 1998), but has not reached the semifinals since then.
- U.S. women's national rugby sevens team — (Women's Eagles Sevens) competes in the World Rugby Women's Sevens Series, and have finished in the top six each season since the inaugural series season in 2012–13. The Women's Eagles Sevens also qualify for and compete in the Summer Olympics.
- United States national under-20 rugby union team — competes annually, most notably with rival nation to the north, Canada in exhibition tournaments.

== Professional rugby ==
The Professional Rugby Organization, known as PRO Rugby, was an American professional rugby union competition that played in 2016. This was the first professional rugby competition in North America. PRO played only the 2016 season, before it ceased operations as of January 2017.

Major League Rugby, another professional competition, was founded in late 2017. It began play in 2018 with seven teams, and has expanded to 12 teams as of the 2024 season.

Premier Rugby Sevens, a professional rugby sevens competition, was officially sanctioned in 2021 and has played two seasons thus far in 2021 and 2022.

The top domestic competition for women's rugby in the US is Women's Elite Rugby (WER) with six teams.

== Club competitions ==
USA Rugby hosts two national championships in the club space. The Club National Championships in early June along with the Club 7s National Championship in mid August.

Rugby Super League, organized and sanctioned by USA Rugby, was the premier national level of men's club competition in the US. It was founded in 1996, but ended play as of 2012 following the Great Recession. Following the demise of the Super League, the Pacific Rugby Premiership was formed in 2013, and began play in 2014 as the top level of men's club competition in the U.S.

The USA Rugby club structure sees the United States divided into two leagues: West and East. Within each league there are four conferences, with the winners of each conference's division advancing to the league semifinals, and the two league champions competing in the national championship.

East: Atlantic North, Mid-Atlantic, Midwest, Southern

West: Pacific North, Pacific South, Frontier, Red River

== College rugby ==
USA Rugby hosts five total championship competitions annually. The Men's Division 1-A, Women's D1 Elite, Spring College, Fall College and College 7s Championships.

The Collegiate Rugby Championship is a rival rugby sevens competition held since 2010 but not sponsored by USA Rugby. Beginning in 2021, that tournament has been organized by the competing National Collegiate Rugby (NCR) organization for its member schools. Since the CRC franchise was licensed to NCR, the tournament has primarily featured comparatively smaller universities. USA Rugby, the older rival of NCR, conducts its own separate collegiate sevens championship annually, organized by its arm, the Collegiate Rugby Association of America.

== State Governing Bodies ==
State Governing Bodies are responsible for developing an administrative structure with the objective of promoting the development of youth rugby within their state. They are also responsible for day-to-day governance, including organizing league structures, collecting dues, implementing a state championship, and conducting rugby outreach. USA Rugby has 44 state rugby organizations.

== Hall of Fame ==
=== World Rugby Hall of Fame ===
The following have been inducted into the World Rugby Hall of Fame:

Inductee	Year Inducted	Accomplishments
1920 U.S. Olympic rugby team	2012	Won the gold medal.
1924 U.S. Olympic rugby team	2012	Won the gold medal.
Patty Jervey	2014	Played in five Women's World Cups.
Daniel Carroll	2016	A member of the 1920 Olympic team
Phaidra Knight	2017	Won All-World Team honors in 2002, 2006
Kathy Flores	2022	A member of the team which won the 1991 Women's World Cup

=== U.S. Rugby Hall of Fame ===
Below is a list of individuals and teams who have been inducted into the U.S. Rugby Hall of Fame by the US Rugby Foundation due to their lasting impression on rugby in the United States.

Inductee	Year Inducted	Accomplishments
1920 U.S. Olympic rugby team	2011	Won the 1920 Olympic gold medal with a final score of 8–0 against France.
1924 U.S. Olympic rugby team	2011	Won the 1924 Olympic gold medal with an 11–3 score against France.
Pat Vincent	2011	President of the Northern California Rugby Union (1973–1976) and a charter signer and co-founder of USA Rugby (1975). Governor of the U.S. Union (1975–1977).
Dennis Storer	2011	First head coach of the U.S. national team (1976–1982) and the UCLA rugby team (1966–1982) with a coaching record of 362–46–2.
Keith Seaber	2011	Served for 15 years on the U.S. Union's board of directors, including as Secretary and Vice President. Managed the first Eagles team in 1976. Attended the first 25 Can-Am games, often as the only US official present.
Miles "Doc" Hudson	2011	Head coach of the Cal Golden Bears for 36 seasons (1938–1974); 339 wins, 84 losses and 23 ties; most wins by a coach in U.S. college rugby.
Kevin Higgins	2012	Played in 28 test matches for the Eagles and was captain in three. Played for the United States in the 1987 and 1991 Rugby World Cups.
Robinson Bordley	2012	Captained the United States in the first two tests they played in the 1970s.
Harry F. Langenberg	2012	Co-founded the Missouri Rugby Football Union in 1933; secretary from 1933 to 1983.
Ed Lee	2012	Founding member of the USA Rugby Football Union (USA Rugby).
Colby E. "Babe" Slater	2012	Player in the 1920 U.S.A. Olympic-gold winning team and Captain of the 1924 U.S.A. Olympic-gold winning team.
Craig B. Sweeney	2012	Played in the first four tests for the United States Eagles. Captained the team in the third and fourth tests.
Victor R. Hilarov	2013	Founding member and first President of U.S. Rugby Football Union (USA Rugby) in 1975.
Ray Cornbill	2013	Head coach for the USA Eagles for eight test matches during the 1970 and 1980s.
Edward Hagerty Jr.	2013	Editor in Chief of Rugby Magazine from 1977 to 2009.
Ian Nixon	2013	USARFU's 6th president from 1991 to 1995. Refereed several test matches.
A. Jon Prusmack	2013	Founded Rugby Magazine (originally known as Scrumdown) in 1968. Purchased the USA Sevens tournament in 2005. Created the Collegiate Rugby Championship in 2010 in partnership with NBC.
Dick Smith	2013	Founding member and Director of the U.S. Rugby Football Union (USA Rugby) in 1975.
Jack Clark	2014	Former U.S. national team player, former head coach of the U.S. national team, and the current head coach at the University of California, Berkeley, where he became the sixth coach in team history in 1984.
Kevin R. Swords	2014	Former U.S. national team player and captain who represented the U.S. at the 1987 and 1991 Rugby World Cups.
Jay Hanson	2014	Earned seven caps for the U.S. national team and toured with the Eagles on their first three international tours to England, Australia and Japan.
Tom Selfridge	2014	Played in the first three matches for the United States in the Modern Era: Australia, France and Canada. Is a past president of the Eastern Rugby Union.
Dr. Richard Donelli	2014	Had a profound influence on the game as a leader, innovator, coach and administrator, and was one of the best players of his era.
Terry Fleener	2014	First president of the Eastern Rockies Rugby Football Union and a former president of the United States RFU.
Ron Mayes	2014	Coached the Old Blues to the first five National Club Championship titles. Coached the U.S. National team from 1972 thru the first ever Rugby World Cup in 1987.
Anne Barry	2014	Served USA Rugby as its president from 1998 to 2002 and as treasurer from 1990 to 1998. She continued serving on the USA Rugby Board until 2005.
Mickey Ording	2015	Started at tighthead prop for the United States against Australia in the first game of the Modern Era. He went onto play in three of the next four U.S. matches.
Don Morrison	2015	Was an international referee from 1981 to 1990. Was Chairman of USA Rugby's Referees and Laws Committee from 1990 to 1998 and concurrently, was Chairman of the Evaluation Committee from 1990 to 2002.
Dick Poulson	2015	Former president of the Washington Rugby Club. Founded the Washington 7s and Cherry Blossom tournaments; and later, the Potomac Rugby Union and the Potomac Referee's Society.
Jeff Lombard	2015	Became the first person in U.S. rugby history to play and manage the U.S. national team when he managed the Eagles at the 1987 Rugby World Cup.
Bill Fraumann	2015	Was a reserve for the United States against Australia in the first match of the Modern Era. Scored the first two tries for the U.S. in their next match against France.
Mike Purcell	2015	Played for the United States at the first ever Rugby World Cup in 1987 and scored the first try for the United States in RWC history. Captained the U.S. 7s team to the Plate Championship in 1986.
Bob Watkins	2015	Founding Director of the United States of America Rugby Football Union in 1975 and was a three-term president of USA Rugby. Was instrumental in the formation of the U.S. Rugby Super League and served as its chairman for the first five years.
Tom Billups	2015	Played for both the United States 15s (44 caps) and 7s (25 caps) teams, and was head coach of the U.S. 15s team (2001–2006) and 7s team (2005).
Patty Jervey	2015	Scored 38 tries during her 40-test match career for the United States national team. Played in five Rugby World Cups for the U.S., including the 1991 victorious team.
Emil Signes	2015	Was a successful club and representative side before being named coach of both the United States national men's and women's 7s teams.
Rudy Scholz	2015	Was heavily involved as a player and administrator on both the 1920 and 1924 U.S. Olympic gold medal-winning rugby teams. Played his last game of rugby in 1979 at age 83.
Ed Burlingham	2015	Was captain for the United States at the first ever Rugby World Cup in 1987. Was an assistant coach for the U.S. at the 1991 Rugby World Cup.
Steve Gray	2016	Was part of the U.S. men's national team that played the first match of the Modern Era in 1976. Was capped for the U.S. in both 7s and 15s and went onto coach the U.S. Men's 7s team.
Dan Lyle	2016	Former captain of the U.S. men's national team who starred in both 7s and the 15s for the United States. Following his playing career, he has working as a rugby broadcaster and is currently the Director of Rugby for AEG Worldwide.
Dave Sitton	2016	For many years, was the voice of rugby in the United States. He also coached the University of Arizona for over 35 years and mentored over 1,600 student athletes through the years.
Brian Vizard	2016	Played for both the U.S. national 7s and 15s teams. He played in the first two 15s Rugby World Cup and the first 7s RWC. He is the current president of the United States Rugby Foundation.
Brad Andrews	2016	Played for the United States national team from 1977 to 1979 and captained the team in 1979. He was on the U.S. team that won their first international in the Modern Era.
Jay Berwanger	2016	In 1935, became the first winner of the Downtown Athletic Club Trophy (the following year the award was renamed the Heisman Trophy). He started playing rugby in 1939 and starred on a Chicago team that won 19 straight matches, including a victory over New York in front of 10,000 spectators at Soldier Field.
George Betzler	2016	Former head coach and assistant coach of the United States national team. He also held many other head coaching positions, including with the Eastern Penn All Stars, USA East, Marine Corps All Service Team and the USA Maccabi Team.
Kathy Flores	2016	Former U.S. national team player and a member of the victorious 1991 Rugby World Cup U.S. team. She also coached the United States Women's national team from 2002 to 2010 and coached the Eagles at the 2006 and 2010 RWC.
Jim Russell	2017	After a long playing career, made his mark in U.S. rugby as a referee. During his 26 years as a referee: was an A Panel ref, earned an appointment at the 1987 Rugby World Cup and the 1990 Hong Kong 7s, and more recently, served as a World Rugby Judicial and Appeal Officer.
Ed Schram Sr.	2017	Former chairman of the National Team Selection Committee from 1986 to 1991. Was also named U.S. National Team Manager and served in that role in 33 test matches, including at the 1991 Rugby World Cup.
Tommy Smith	2017	Named to the All-Time, All-World 20th anniversary team for the Hong Kong Sevens Tournament. Won the Best and Fairest Award at the 1986 Hong Kong Sevens, the only American to win the award.
Jay Waldron	2017	Has played on various representative sides, and served in various coaching and administrative positions with different clubs and unions throughout the country for over 50 years.
1991 USA Women's Team	2017	1991 Women's Rugby World Cup Champions
Steve Finkel	2017	Played on the first U.S. Men's Rugby World Cup team in 1987. Also played for several years on the U.S. 7s team and would later head coach the U.S. Men's 7s team, including at the first ever 7s Rugby World Cup in 1993.
Dave Hodges	2017	Earned 53 caps over an eight-year career with the U.S. Men's national team and was captain of the team in more than half of those matches. He held many positions with USA Rugby and was general manager of the U.S. men's national team at the 2019 Rugby World Cup.
Lyle Micheli	2017	Was a prop for over 40 years for several clubs in the East and Midwest before finally hanging up his boots his boots at 60 years of age. He was Chairman of USA Rugby's Medical and Risk Management Committee and was inducted into the USA Rugby Sports Medicine Hall of Fame in 2013.
Tim O'Brien	2017	Represented the United States in both 15s and 7s. Won national championships as a player for both Cal and the Old Blues, and as a head coach at St. Mary's College of California.
Candi Orsini	2017	Former U.S. national team player and a member of the victorious 1991 Rugby World Cup U.S. team. She also played on the 1994 and 1998 U.S. Women's RWC teams and was an assistant coach for the US women's team at the 2006 and 2010 RWC.
Mike Saunders	2018	Captained OMBAC to four national championship titles. Was a former captain of the United States national team and played in the first ever Rugby World Cup. Played and coached the U.S. men's 7s team and coached the Snake River Rugby Club for over 20 years.
Denis Shanagher Sr.	2018	The pioneering referee in Northern California, the Pacific Coast and the US from 1957 to 1987.He was the first referee to handle an international match, refereeing the U.S.-Canada match in 1977.
Alexandra Williams	2018	Played 11 years for the United States women's national team and played in the 1994, 1998 and 2002 Rugby World Cups. A brilliant leader by example, she captained every rugby team she played on.
Dr. John Chase	2018	Served as the U.S. Men's National Team's on the team's first international tour (to England) of the Modern Era in 1977, the first time a medical specialist traveled with an international team. Subsequently, all international teams traveled with their own physician.
Reldon "Bing" Dawson	2018	Coached OMBAC to six National Club titles and one Rugby Super League crown, and the Pacific Coast Grizzlies to numerous territorial titles. Was an assistant coach for the U.S. at the 1991 Rugby World Cup.
Don Haider	2018	Started his rugby career at Stanford University and played his last game, for the Stanford Alumni in 2014. In between, he played and served for several East Coast based teams. He is a Founding member of the U.S. Rugby Foundation.
Gary Lambert	2018	Starred for the United States in both 7s and 15s. Was capped 18 times in 15s, played in the first Rugby World Cup and was selected for two World XVs teams. He played for the U.S. 7s team from 1982 to 1991 and played in the Hong Kong Sevens on eight occasions.
Vaea Anitoni	2019	All-time leading try scorer for the United States as of 2019 who had 46 caps playing for the United States 15 and 7s teams between 1992 and 2000. He was a member of the preliminary squad for the United States during the 2000 Rugby World Cup Sevens.
Bob Causey	2019	Began as a player for Louisiana State University in 1972 and had 8 caps with the US Eagles. Coached his alma mater, LSU Rugby, to a career record of 187-30 and a No. 6 ranking in 2009.
Jen Crawford	2019	Played for the Eagles as a center, wing, and fullback between 1988 and 1998, participating in three Rugby World Cups and earning 20 caps. Went on to work with the Berkley All-Blues as a player and an assistant coach, leading them to nine consecutive U.S.A. Rugby National Women's Club Championships.
John Decker	2019	Played for 15 years with the Washington Rugby Football Club and Old Blues. Served for over 30 years (as of 2019) as a trustee/director for the US Rugby Foundation Board, with seven of those years as chairman of the board.
Luke Gross	2019	Earned 62 caps for the United States between 1996 and 2003, including the 1999 and 2003 Rugby World Cups. Is a 300-level coach and has been serving as a coach and administrator for over ten years.
Shawn Lipman	2019	Represented the United States in the 1991 Rugby World Cup and captained the U.S. team for the Maccabiah Games in 1993 and 1997. Served as coach for the U.S. Maccabiah Rugby Team in 2013 and 2017. Is the first person to gain a gold medal as a player and a coach for rugby at the Maccabiah Games.
J. "Tyke" Nollman	2019	Established the Inter-Territorial Tournament (ITTs) and developed rugby's national presence through sponsorships and marketing strategies.
Don Reordan	2019	Refereed 12 international test matches from 1988 to 1997 and 12 additional matches involving national teams. As of 2019, he was the only American referee to officiate a World Cup match.
Dan Lyle	2020	Had 125 senior appearances with the Bath Football Club between 1996-2003 and 44 caps for the U.S.A. Eagles between 1994 and 2003. Currently serves as the Executive Vice President for USA Sevens.
Rick Bailey	2020	Played as loose-head prop for Cal Golden Bears from 1974 to 1977 then the U.S.A. Eagles from 1979 to 1987, including the inaugural US Men's Rugby World Cup team in 1987. Served as a Cal Golden Bears assistant coach from 1991 to 1994.
Tam Breckenridge	2020	Played as lock in the U.S.A. Eagles from 1988 to 1994 and helped the team win the first ever Women's Rugby World Cup title in 1991. Was arguably the premier lock in women's rugby during her era.
Jamie Burke	2020	Was the first woman to earn 50 caps for the U.S.A. Eagles, serving as a prop between 2004 and 2014, including three Rugby World Cups. Was named to the 2010 IRB World Cup Dream Team and to Rugby Magazine's Team of the Year and Team of the Decade in 2010.
William V. Campbell	2020	Cofounded the Columbia University RFC in 1961 and cofounded the Old Blue RFC in New York City in 1963. Captained and served as president of Old Blue.
Chris Lippert	2020	Helped the OMBAC reach five national championships in 1989, 1991, 1993, 1994, and 1996. Played as a loose-head prop for the U.S.A. Eagles from 1989 to 1998, including the 1991 Rugby World Cup, retiring with 38 caps, the record for an U.S. player at the time.
Gerard B.A. Seymour	2020	Organized Kansas City's first club, Kansas City Rugby Football Club, in 1964. Represented the Western Rugby Football Union at the meeting where the U.S.A. Rugby Football Union was formed then represented the US as its ambassador at the first Rugby World Cup in 1987 and served as a director of U.S.A. Rugby for 14 years.
Alatini Saulala	2021	Played with the Tongan National Rugby team from 1990 to 1991 in 16 total test matches, the U.S.A. Eagles from 1997 to 2000, earning 16 caps in 15s and 12 caps in 7s.
Ed Todd	2021	Served as a referee administrator for USA Rugby and the Northern California Rugby Football Referee Society for over 30 years and served as the USA Rugby Referee Development Manager between 2005 and 2014, overseeing national referee standards and education.
Kevin O'Brien	2021	USA Women's Coach during the 1991 Women's Rugby World Cup Championship, leading the U.S.A. Eagles to taking home gold and had an undefeated international record of 7–0 as a coach.
Mike MacDonald	2021	Represented the United States in three Rugby World Cups in 2003, 2007, and 2011, and earned a then record of 67 caps with the U.S.A. Eagles between 2000 and 2011.
Phaidra Knight	2021	Earned 35 caps with the U.S.A. Eagles and started in three World Cups in 2002, 2006 and 2010. WAs USA Player of the Decade in 2010. Founded PeaK Unleashed Foundation in 2019, an organization dedicated to the advancement of marginalized youth through rugby and yoga.
Salty Thompson	2021	Coached USA Age Grade teams, u19, u20s, and High School All American levels from 2002 to 2018. This included seven u19 IRB World Championships, the inaugural 2008 World u20 Championships, and the 1st World Trophy in 2009.
Todd Cleaver	2021	Played as a prop with the Eagles 15s from 2004 to 2019, earning 76 caps, 53 as captain, and appearing in three Rugby World Cup squads. Was a member of the Eagles 7s from 2004 to 2011 and played in 26 tournaments. Became the first American to play Super Rugby and the first to score a try with the Golden Lions in 2009.
Tristan Lewis	2021	Served as manager for numerous USA National teams and coaches on both men's and women's sides between 2000 and 2014. His career in team management covered 14 years, 85 tests, three Men's 15s Rugby World Cups and two Rugby World Cup 7s.
Steve Cohen	2022	
Phillip Eloff	2022	
Gary Hein	2022	
Maryann Sorensen	2022	
Zack Test	2022	
Mose Timoteo	2022	
Blane Warhurst	2022	
Mike Flanagan	2023	
Roy Helu	2023	
Bob Latham	2023	
Dr. Julia McCoy	2023	
Chris O'Brien	2023	
Mike Petri	2023	
Peter Watson	2023	
Denis Shanagher	2024	
Alec Parker	2024	
Tristan Lewis	2024	
Victoria Folayan	2024	
Larry Gelwix	2024	
Lou Stanfill	2024	
Mike Tolkin	2024	
Jamie Jordan	2024	
Nancy Fitz	2024	
Barb Fugate	2025	
Bill Leversee	2025	
Danita Knox	2025	
Jillion Potter	2025	
Jone Naqica	2025	
Kort Schubert	2025	
Tony Ridnell	2025	
Alexander Goff	2026	
Alexander Magleby	2026	
Edward Ayub	2026	
Irene Gardener	2026	
Kerrissa Heffernan	2026	
Kevin Battle	2026	
William Sexton	2026	

== Coaching ==
USA Rugby oversees coaching and referee development of the game. USA Rugby requires coaches and referees to register and complete a number of certification courses depending on the level of play.

== Geographical unions ==
USA Rugby organizes amateur registered rugby teams into thirteen geographical unions at the senior club level. High school and youth teams affiliate with State Rugby Organizations while college teams register with either Geographical Unions or College Conferences.

The current Geographical Unions are:

- Capital (Maryland, Virginia, Washington, D.C.)
- Carolinas
- Eastern Penn (also covers Delaware and South Jersey)
- Empire (New York, southern Connecticut and northern New Jersey)
- Florida (excludes most of the Panhandle)
- Mid-America (Arkansas, Kansas, Missouri, Nebraska, Oklahoma, and parts of Illinois)
- New England
- Northern California (also covers all of Nevada outside of the Las Vegas Valley)
- Pacific Northwest (Idaho, Oregon, Washington)
- Rocky Mountain (Colorado, Utah, Wyoming, and western South Dakota)
- Southern California (also covers Arizona, New Mexico, and the Las Vegas Valley)
- Texas (also covers most of Arkansas and Louisiana)
- True South (Alabama, Louisiana, Mississippi, Tennessee, and the Florida Panhandle)

The following states are not currently covered by a geographic union:

- Georgia
- Illinois
- Indiana
- Iowa
- Kentucky
- Michigan
- Minnesota
- Montana
- North Dakota
- Ohio
- West Virginia
- Wisconsin
- In addition, Western Pennsylvania is not covered by a geographic union.

== Past leaders ==
=== Elected governance history ===
Election Date	President	Vice-president	Treasurer	Secretary
June 1975	Victor Hilarov	Richard Moneymaker	Gail Tennant	Edmond Lee
June 1977	Victor Hilarov	Richard Moneymaker	Gail Tennant	Edmond Lee
June 1979	Richard Moneymaker	Fritz Grunebaum	David Chambers	Vacant
June 1981	David Chambers	Fritz Grunebaum	Joe Reagan	Keith Seaber
June 1983	Robert Watkins	Keith Seaber	Terry Fleener	Robert Jones
June 1985	Robert Watkins	Keith Seaber	Terry Fleener	Tom Selfridge (resigned summer of 86, and not replaced)
June 1987	Terry Fleener	Bill McEnteer	Edward Kane	Dick Elliot (replaced by Ian Nixon by December 1987)
June 1989	Robert Watkins	W.T. Haffner	Brad Sharp	Ian Nixon
June 1991	Ian Nixon	W.T. Haffner	Bill Podewils	Gene Roberts
November 1992	Ian Nixon	Randy Stainer	Anne Barry	W.T. Haffner (resigned June 94; replaced by Jami Jordan)
November 1994	John D'Amico	Randy Stainer	Anne Barry	Jami Jordan

In June 1987, the position of chairman of the Board was added to the executive committee, and Bob Watkins was named to that position. Effective June 1989, that position was retitled Post of Past President, and remained an appointed post until the position was dropped in 1996.

Effective January 1996, an executive vice president was added.

Election Date	President	Executive Vice-president	Vice-president	Treasurer	Secretary
January 1996	Gene Roberts	Tony Skillbeck	Neal Brendel	Anne Barry	Reyn Kinzey
January 1998	Anne Barry	Neal Brendel	Tristan Lewis	Barbara Fugate	Pat O'Connor

Effective March 2000, the Vice President was replaced with Athlete Vice President.

Election Date	President	Executive Vice-president	Athlete Vice-president	Treasurer	Secretary
March 2000	Anne Barry	Neal Brendel	Mary Dixey	Fred Roedel III	Pat O'Connor
March 2002	Neal Brendel	Robert Latham	Jen Crawford	Fred Roedel III	Pat O'Connor

Effective April 2004, the President title was replaced with chairman, and an USARRA Representative was added.

Election Date	Chairman	Vice Chairman	Athlete Vice Chairman	Treasurer	Secretary	USARRA Rep
April 2004	Neal Brendel	Robert Latham	Don James	Fred Roedel III	David Pelton	Buzz McClain
March 2006	Robert Latham	Frank Merrill	Alex Magleby	Thomas Schmidt	David Pelton	John McConnell

Effective July 14, 2006, the governance was changed to a model with a board of directors nominated and approved by a congress.

=== National office ===
The governing body of USA Rugby opened a national office on June 3, 1988. The office has been headed by:

Name	Title	Start date	End date
Kirk Miles	Executive Director	May 2, 1988	December 20, 1989
Roger Neppl	Executive Director	May 1, 1995	September 6, 1995
Paul Montville	Executive Director	November 24, 1997	April 1999
Terry Fleener	Interim Director	April 1999	June 21, 1999
Mark Rudolph	Executive Director	June 21, 1999	November 9, 2001
Dean Hahn		November 9, 2001	
Doug Arnot	CEO	December 1, 2002	July 14, 2006
Steve Griffiths			
Nigel Melville	CEO and President of Rugby Operations	October 11, 2006	June 25, 2016
Jim Snyder	Interim CEO	June 27, 2016	July 31, 2016
Dan Payne	CEO	August 1, 2016	
Ross Young	CEO	April 30, 2018	
Bill Goren	CEO	February 18, 2024	

== See also ==
- Americas Rugby Championship
- Churchill Cup (defunct)
- Rugby union in the United States
- Sports broadcasting contracts in the United States#Rugby
- Super Powers Cup (defunct)
- United States at the Rugby World Cup
- USA Rugby Sevens Collegiate National Championships
