= Los Angeles Rugby Club =

US rugby union club, based in Los Angeles, CA

(United States) Los Angeles Rugby Club (LARC)
- Full name: Los Angeles Rugby Club
- Union: USA Rugby
- Nickname: LARC
- Founded: 1958; 68 years ago
- Location: South Bay, Los Angeles, California, United States
- President: Rory Kaclik
- Coach: Barry Williams
- League: Southern California Rugby Football Union
1st kit	2nd kit

Official website
- www.larugby.com

The Los Angeles Rugby Club (LARC) is a rugby union club in South Bay in Los Angeles County, California, United States. It is a member of the Southern California Rugby Football Union within USA Rugby.

== History ==
The Los Angeles Rugby Club is the second oldest club in the Southern California Rugby Football Union (SCRFU). The Club was founded in 1958 as the Universities Rugby Club. Founding members included Al Williams and Dick Hyland, members of the Gold Medal winning 1924 USA Olympic Rugby Team.

Los Angeles Rugby Club (LARC) has contributed extensively to the development of the game of rugby union on the Pacific Coast and the USA. Many teams can trace their beginnings to the direct effort of the Los Angeles R.C. or to former members who have relocated and founded clubs in their respective areas.

In 2004, LARC forged an informal partnership with the Manhattan Beach Youth Rugby Club a member of Southern California Youth Rugby, an autonomous subset of the SCRFU. LARC made this partnership official in 2013 when they merged with the Manhattan Beach Tykes which put 6 youth teams under the LARC umbrella; U8, U10, U12, U14, U16, and U18. LARC also had an informal partnership with Los Angeles Coast Women's Rugby Football Club that began in 2007 but ceased when the Coast team folded in 2011.

LARC has long-time rivalries Santa Monica Rugby Club, Old Mission Beach Athletic Club (OMBAC), and Belmont Shore RFC. In 1984, LARC was the Pacific Coast RFU Territorial Champion and Division 1 National Finalists. The 2007 road to the National Championship title ended just short bringing home the Div II 3rd place Cup, and a Southern California Championship. LARC returned to Div 1 in 2008 where they had a successful season defeating OMBAC, Santa Monica, San Mateo and others on their way to the National Playoffs and a Div 1 #12 National Ranking. LARC met Life RFC in Austin, TX in the National Playoffs, LA came up short to Life RFC who went on to win the 2008 Div 1 National Championship. In 2009 LARC fell just short of their National Title aspirations again losing in the quarterfinals 7–15 to Aspen RFC who went on to win the 2009 Div 1 National Championships. LARC finished the 2009 season with a #8 National Ranking.

== Notable players and coaches ==
Notable players and coaches include: John Mickel (Scrumhalf), Joe Clarkson (Flyhalf), Ray Nelson, Doug Rollerson, Gary Cunningham (New Zealand), and Al Caravelli.

== Tournaments and tours ==
The Club currently hosts the Catalina Island Rugby Festival the first weekend in May. The tournament is administered by Tom Hendrix and LARC Honorary Life Member Joe Hendrix. These tournaments have raised funds for charitable contributions to The Special Olympics, The Wellness Community of the South Bay, and many others.

In 1967, LARC was the first mainland club side to tour Hawaii. In 1974 the Club had its first European trip – a two-week, five game tour of France and Belgium. LARC's host was French club Chateaurenard RFC, which in turn LARC hosted in 1975. In September 1977, the club toured Wales and Ireland and played eight matches. A five match tour to New Zealand followed in 1980.

LARC has played host to many rugby touring sides visiting the U.S. Pacific Coast, playing matches against teams such as: Club Pueyrredon, St. Andrews F.P. (Argentina); Ponsonby, Kaierau, Paeroa West (New Zealand); Paris University Club, Chateaurenard (France); Old Wesley, Clontarf, Old Crescent (Ireland); Sale, Orrell, Richmond, and Osterley (England).

The Ganey Cup was an annual tournament that pitted southern California D1 teams with their Super League rivals.

Dave Lockridge secures the line-out vs SLO RFC of San Luis Obispo, CA

Sean Roy goes into contact vs Naples, Florida
