= John Everett (disambiguation) =

John Everett was an English painter.

John Everett may also refer to:

- John Everett (rower) (born 1954), American Olympic rower
- John Everett (rugby union) (born 1957), American rugby union player

== See also ==
- John Everet, highwayman in Everet v Williams, 1700s English court case about contracts to commit crimes
- John Everett-Heath, British author, former civil servant, and Fellow of the Royal Geographical Society
- John Everett Lyle Streight (1880–1955), Canadian lumber merchant, military officer and politician
- John Everett Millais (1829–1896), English painter and illustrator
- John Everett Robbins (1903–1995), Canadian educator and encyclopedia editor
- John Everetts (1873–1956), United States Navy sailor
