= Hagimoto =

Hagimoto (written: 萩本) is a Japanese surname. Notable people with the surname include:

- Kinichi Hagimoto (萩本 欽一, born 1941), Japanese comedian
- Mitsutake Hagimoto (萩本 光威, born 1959), Japanese rugby union player and coach
