= Kevin Higgins =

Kevin Higgins may refer to:

- Kevin Higgins (American football) (born 1955), American football coach, currently an assistant coach at Wake Forest
- Kevin Higgins (Australian footballer) (born 1951), former Australian rules footballer
- Kevin Higgins (poet) (born 1967), Irish poet
- Kevin Higgins (baseball) (born 1967), Major League Baseball catcher
- Kevin Higgins (rugby union) (1962–1996), American rugby union player
