= Michihito Chida =

Japanese rugby union player

- Born: December 22, 1958 (age 67) Kitakami, Iwate Prefecture, Japan
- Height: 6 ft 0 in (1.83 m)
- School: Kurosawajiri High School
- Occupation(s): Teacher at the Kitakami Municipal South Junior High School and Kitakami Rugby School

Rugby union career
- Position(s): Lock, Flanker, Number 8
Amateur team(s)
Years	Team	Apps	(Points)
-	Kurosawajiri High School		
Senior career
Years	Team	Apps	(Points)
1980–1988	Nippon Steel Kamaishi		
International career
Years	Team	Apps	(Points)
1980–1987	Japan	26	(0)

Michihiko Chida (千田美智仁, Chida Michihiko) (born 22 December 1958 in Kitakami) is a former Japanese rugby union player who played mainly as Number 8.

== Biography ==
After graduating from Kurosawajiri High School of Iwate, Chida started to play for Nippon Steel Kamaishi. He played as lock while representing Kamaishi and Japan. During the 1983 Japan tour of Wales, Chida played as flanker in order to enlarge the third row. Later, he played as flanker and as number 8 for Japan and mainly played as number 8 for Kamaishi. In 1985, during the Japanese championship against Doshisha, Chida received the ball, leaving Doshisha's defense and went down the goal post. While combining power and speed, he is not a rushing type, but a clever forward that accurately judges pass and dense formation according to circumstances, He was active as a mainstay of Nippon Steel Kamaishi's seventh consecutive victory of the Rugby Japanese Championship and also served as a forward for the contemporaneous rugby Japanese national team.

== International career ==
His debut for Japan was against New Zealand Universities, at Tokyo, on 30 March 1980. During the match against Wales in 1983, Chida rushed 20 metres from a scrum to score a try late in the second half in the Wales match. He was also a member of the 1987 Rugby World Cup roster, where he played two matches, with the pool match against England at Sydney being his last for Japan.

== Personal life ==
Currently, he works as sales manager for Nippon Steel Engineering Morioka as well as advisor for club team Blaze Lager from Kitakami. He is also teaching at the Kitakami Municipal South Junior High School and Kitakami Rugby School. According to Number (22 January 2010), former prop Jiro Ishiyama, who was a teammate in Kamaishi and in the Japan national team stated "Although Hayashi (Toshiyuki) and Oyagi (Atsushi) are never weak, nevertheless, it was Chida who gave the most power required to the scrum."
