= Vizard =

Vizard or visard may refer to:

- Visard, a mask worn by women in 16th- and 17th-century fashion
- Vizard (surname)
- Vizards, characters in the Bleach manga and anime
