= John Mickel =

John Mickel may refer to:

- John Mickel (racing driver) (b. 1971)
- John Mickel (politician) (b. 1953)
- John Mickel (rugby union)
- John T. Mickel (1934–2024), botanist
