= Tsutomu Hirose =

Japan international rugby union player

- Born: July 24, 1963 (age 63) Shizuoka, Japan
- School: Shimizu Minami High School
- University: Doshisha University

Rugby union career
- Position: Hooker
Amateur team(s)
Years	Team	Apps	(Points)
- Shimizu Minami High School RFC
–	Doshisha University RFC		
Senior career
Years	Team	Apps	(Points)
-1988	Ricoh		
International career
Years	Team	Apps	(Points)
1987-1988	Japan	3	(0)

Tsutomu Hirose (広瀬務, Hirose Tsutomu) (born 24 July 1963 in Shizuoka Prefecture) is a former Japanese rugby union player. He played as a hooker.

== Career ==
Hirose started his rugby career while attending Doshisha University, for whose rugby team he played. After his graduation, he played for Ricoh until his retirement. His first cap for Japan was against Ireland Students, in Tokyo, on 3 October 1987. He was also among the players called up by the then-national coach Katsumi Miyaji for the 1987 Rugby World Cup squad, although he never played any match in the tournament. His last cap was against the 1988 Asian Rugby Championship against South Korea, in Hong Kong, on 19 November 1988, where Japan arrived second in the championship. Hirose was also part of the Japan squad which defeated Scotland XV on 28 May 1989, but he never saw action.
