= Yoshihiko Sakuraba =

Japan international rugby union player

- Born: September 22, 1966 (age 60) Akita Prefecture, Japan
- Height: 6 ft 3 in (1.91 m)
- Weight: 228 lb (103 kg)
- School: Akita Technical High School
- University: Hosei University

Rugby union career
- Position: Lock
Amateur team(s)
Years	Team	Apps	(Points)
1982-1985	Akita Technical High School		
Senior career
Years	Team	Apps	(Points)
1985-2001	Kamaishi Seawaves		
International career
Years	Team	Apps	(Points)
1986-1999	Japan	43	(5)
Coaching career
- Years: Team
- 2003-2006: Kamaishi Seawaves

Yoshihiko Sakuraba (桜庭吉彦, Sakuraba Yoshihiko), (born 22 September 1966 in Akita) is a Japanese former rugby union player and coach. Currently, he works as general manager for Kamaishi Seawaves and as ambassador for the 2019 Rugby World Cup.

== Biography ==
At Akita Industrial High School, he won the first prize at Hanazono. In the third year, after graduating, Sakuraba joined Nippon Steel Kamaishi, which achieved the seventh consecutive title in the Japanese championship in the previous year.

== International career ==
In 1986, Kazuraba achieved his first cap with the Japan national team against Scotland, at Murrayfield, on 27 September 1986. The following year he was called up by the then coach Katsumi Miyaji to take part to the 1987 Rugby World Cup, where he played only the match against England at Sydney. He also took part in the 1995 Rugby World Cup, where he played all the pool matches and in the 1999 Rugby World Cup, where he played only two matches, against Wales and against Argentina, the former of which was his last cap for Japan.

== Coaching career ==
In 2001, Nippon Steel Kamaishi was renamed Kamaishi Seawaves and Sakuraba retired as a player after the season. In the 2003-04 season, Sakuraba was appointed coach and led Seawaves to the Japanese championship for the first time in 19 years. In 2005, Sakuraba returned as coach concurrently. The following year, he retired and was appointed as team advisor.

He was the longest active player for the Japan national team since the first World Cup.
