= Katsufumi Miyamoto =

Japan international rugby union player (born 1966)

- Born: Katsufumi Miyamoto; March 19, 1966 (age 60) Osaka Prefecture, Japan
- Height: 6 ft 0 in (1.83 m)
- Weight: 205 lb (93 kg)
- School: Osaka Institute of Technology
- University: Doshisha University

Rugby union career
- Position: Flanker
Amateur team(s)
Years	Team	Apps	(Points)
-	Osaka Institute of Technology		
–	Doshisha University RFC		
Senior career
Years	Team	Apps	(Points)
1988-1994	Sanyo Electric		
International career
Years	Team	Apps	(Points)
1986-1991	Japan	10	(4)
Coaching career
- Years: Team
- 2004-2008: Sanyo Wild Knights
- 2011-2012: Doshisha University RFC

Katsufumi Miyamoto (宮本勝文, Miyamoto Katsufumi) (born March 19, 1966, in Osaka Prefecture) is a Japanese former rugby union player and coach. He played as flanker.

== Career ==
Miyamoto first started his career playing for the team of Osaka Institute of Technology (currently: Joshou Gakuen High School) and then, for Doshisha University. In 1988, he started to play for Sanyo. Since his amateur days, he took part at the 1987 and 1991 Rugby World Cups with his powerful breakthrough strength as weapon. However, the achievements of the domestic teams, including the university period, ended in second place at the highest, and in his active period he was nicknamed The Battle General of Trouble (悲運の闘将, Hiun no Tōshō), especially in the Japan Company Rugby Football Championship final against Kobe Steel, where in the second half, the match finished in a draw after the Kobe Steel winger Ian Williams scored a try. Miyamoto's regretful expression left a strong impression on the rugby fans nationwide with the then coach, Katsumi Miyaji. Later, Miyaji and Miyamoto continued to play against Kobe Steel, but Sanyo lost. Lastly, during the 1994 Japan Company Rugby Football Championship final in January, Miyamoto retired from playing in the young age of 27 due to a knee injury. After retiring, Miyamoto moved to Hong Kong and focused on his company.

== Coach career ==
After retiring as player, in October 2004 he took over as coach for Sanyo Wild Knights after the sacking of the coach Koichi Shibata, returning to the rugby scene for the first time in ten years. In the 2005 season, Sanyo Wild Knights have won eight consecutive titles since the start, only to lose against Toshiba Brave Lupus in the Top League championship. In the 2007 season, although winning the Top League, Sanyo lost the Microsoft Cup against Suntory Sungoliath in the Japanese championship final, bringing the team to its first Japanese championship title. As from April 1, 2008, Miyamoto was appointed general manager of Sanyo Electric overseas sales division, being still focused on his company's business. In 2011 he was appointed as coach for Doshisha University Rugby Football Club, which classified second in the Kansai League in its inaugural year and played a desperate struggle against Teikyo University. In the following season, he retired as coach of Doshisha University rugby club. In April 2013, he took office as Sanyo Executive Officer.
