= Southern California Rugby Football Union =

USA Rugby-affiliated league

Southern California Football Union
- Abbreviation: Southern California GU
- Formation: 2013
- Region served: Arizona; California; Las Vegas metropolitan area; New Mexico, United States of America

The Southern California Rugby Football Union (SCRFU) is the Geographical Union (GU) governing body within USA Rugby that governs adult rugby union teams in Southern California, the Las Vegas metropolitan area, Arizona, and New Mexico. The SCRFU includes numerous men's and women's, leagues representing all levels of competitive play. College rugby is run by the college conferences and Youth Rugby is governed by Southern California Youth Rugby (SCYR). During the busiest part of the 15s seasons, southern California will have over 80 matches in a weekend. The current board of SCRFU is Geno Mazza (president), Patrick Rashidian (vice president), Kevin Holmquist (treasurer) and Bradley Davidson (secretary).

The referee society associated with SCRFU is Southern California Rugby Referee Society (SCRRS).

== History ==
The oldest club in SCRFU is the Eagle Rock Athletic Club (founded in 1937). The second oldest is the LARC (formed in 1958 as Universities RFC, before changing their name to Los Angeles Rugby Club in 1966).

During the late-1960s and early-1970s, UCLA was the dominant college team in SCRFU, under the coaching of Dennis Storer, later the first Eagles Coach when USA Rugby was formed in 1975. The Santa Monica RFC became the dominant men's team in SCRFU throughout the mid-1970s and early-1980s.

== List of SCRFU Clubs - 2018 season ==
=== Men's Division I ===
- Belmont Shore Rugby
- Life West Gladiators
- Old Mission Beach Athletic (San Diego)
- Olympic Club Rugby
- San Francisco Golden Gate
- Santa Monica Dolphins

=== Men's Division II ===
==== Pacific South Men's D2 Group A (SoCal) ====
- Huntington Beach Unicorns
- Pasadena Rugby
- San Fernando Valley Rugby
- Ventura County Outlaws
- Tempe Rugby Club

==== Pacific South Men's D2 Group B (SoCal) ====
- Back Bay Sharks (Newport Beach/Costa Mesa)
- Los Angeles Rugby Club
- Oceanside Chiefs
- San Diego Old Aztecs

==== Pacific South Men's D2 Group C (AZ/SoCal) ====
- Las Vegas Irish
- Northern Arizona Landsharks
- Red Mountain Warthogs
- Tempe Old Devils

=== Men's Division II B Side ===
==== Pacific South Men's D2-B Group A ====
- Huntington Beach Unicorns B
- Pasadena Rugby B
- San Fernando Valley Rugby B
- Ventura County Outlaws B

==== Pacific South Men's D2-B Group B ====
- Back Bay Sharks B
- Los Angeles Rugby B
- Oceanside Chiefs B
- San Diego Old Aztecs B

==== Pacific South Men's D2-B Group C ====
- Las Vegas Irish B
- Northern Arizona Landsharks B
- Red Mountain Warthogs B
- Tempe Old Devils B

=== Men's Division III ===
- Beaumont Bluehawks
- Eagle Rock Athletic
- Kern County Rugby
- North County Gurkhas
- Orange County Ravens (San Clemente)
- Riverside Rugby
- San Luis Obispo Rugby
- Santa Barbara Grunion Rugby
- Santa Monica Dolphins D3

=== Men's Division IV ===
- Dead Rabbits Rugby
- Los Angeles Rebellion
- Oxy Olde Boys
- San Diego Armada
- South Bay Stingrays (San Diego)
- Temecula Mountain Lions

=== Women's Division I ===
- Belmont Shore Rugby
- San Diego Surfers D1
- Santa Monica Dolphins
- Tempe Ninjas

=== Women's Division II ===
- Fullerton Wolfpack
- Las Vegas Slots
- Old Pueblo Lightning
- Pasadena Rugby
- San Fernando Valley Rugby
- San Luis Obispo Rugby
- Santa Barbara Mermaids
- Ventura County Lady Outlaws

== See also ==
- Rugby union in the United States
