= Neal Brendel =

American rugby union player & lawyer (1954–2021)

- Born: September 12, 1954 McKeesport, Pennsylvania
- Died: August 25, 2021 (aged 66) Pittsburgh, Pennsylvania
- Occupation(s): Lawyer; USA Rugby chairman

Rugby union career
- Position: Prop
Senior career
Years	Team	Apps	(Points)
1980–1990	Pittsburgh Rugby Club		
International career
Years	Team	Apps	(Points)
1983–1987	United States	6	(0)

Neal R. Brendel (September 12, 1954 – August 25, 2021) was an American rugby union player and lawyer. Brendel played at the inaugural 1987 Rugby World Cup. His test debut for the Eagles was against Australia at the Sydney Cricket Ground on July 9, 1983. He made his last appearance for USA against England at the 1987 World Cup at Concord Oval, Sydney, Australia. Brendel served on the USA Rugby Board of Directors and held various executive posts, commencing in 1996 ultimately serving as Chairman of USA Rugby (2002-2005) and was the first National Team player to ascend to the top leadership post of the Union. In 2017, Brendel was presented with the Craig Sweeney Award (part of the US Rugby Hall of Fame) for his service and contributions to the game and the Union. Brendel was in the first class of inductees into the Virginia Rugby Hall of Fame and was its Honorary Chairman. Brendel also served as a Governor of the US Rugby Foundation.

Brendel began his rugby career at Yale University where he was also an All American NCAA wrestler and in 1976 was awarded Yale’s prestigious William Neely Mallory Award (awarded to the Senior male athlete who “best represents the highest ideals of American Sportsmanship”). In 2009, Brendel helped to establish his law firm’s Dubai office and divided his time between Dubai and Pittsburgh.

Brendel died in 2021 at the age of 66 of mesothelioma.
