= Vizard (surname) =

Vizard is a surname of Norman origin, derived from "Wisc(h)ard", from the old Norman/French personal name Guisc(h)ard.

Notable people with the surname include:

- Brian Vizard (born 1959), American rugby union player
- Steve Vizard (born 1956), Australian media personality, businessman and philanthropist
- Ted Vizard (1889–1973), Welsh footballer and manager
- Walter Vizard (1861–1929), English cricketer
- Maude Vizard-Wholohan (1859–1950), Australian arts benefactor
