= Eiji Kutsuki =

Japan international rugby union player

- Born: 25 December 1962 (age 63) Fukui Prefecture, Japan
- School: Wakasa Agricultural High School
- University: Nippon Sport Science University
- Notable relative(s): Yasuhiro Kutsuki (younger brother); Masafumi Kutsuki (younger brother)

Rugby union career
- Position: Centre
Amateur team(s)
| Years | Team | Apps | (Points) |
| 1978-1981 | Wakasa Agricultural High School | | |
| 1981-1985 | Nippon Sports Science University | | |
Senior career
| Years | Team | Apps | (Points) |
| 1985-1996 | Toyota | | |
International career
| Years | Team | Apps | (Points) |
| 1985-1994 | Japan | 30 | (39) |
Coaching career
- Years: Team
- 2003-2007: Toyota Verblitz

Eiji Kutsuki (朽木英次, Kutsuki Eiji) (born Fukui 25 December 1962) is a former Japanese rugby union player and coach. He played as a centre. His younger brothers Yasuhiro and Masafumi were former rugby union players.

== Biography ==
He attended Wakasa Agricultural High School (currently, Wakasa Higashi High School), he graduated from Nippon Sport Science University. After that, he joined Toyota. In 1985 and 1986, at the National Conference Tournament, with Toyota, he won the 1986 Japan Rugby Football Championship title.

== International career ==
His debut with the Japan national team was on 19 October 1985, against France, at Dax. Since then, for a long time in combination with Seiji Hirao, Kutsuki made his place as right centre immovable, earning in total 30 caps.

In the Rugby World Cup, Kutsuki took part in all six matches in the first round of the 1987 Rugby World Cup and in the 1991 Rugby World Cup, including the match where Japan defeated Zimbabwe.

== Coaching career ==
After retiring, Kutsuki took over as manager of Toyota Verblitz. However, in the second round of 2005 season of the Japanese championship, due to suffering a bitter experience against Waseda University, Kutsuki ended to sign his unofficial resignation. Eventually he retired from the coach position in 2007. Afterwards, he served as director.
