= Mikuni (company) =

Japanese automotive products company

Mikuni Corporation
- Native name: 株式会社ミクニ
- Type: Public (K.K)
- Traded as: TYO: 7247
- Industry: Automotive
- Founded: (October 1, 1923; 102 years ago)
- Headquarters: Sotokanda, Chiyoda-ku, Tokyo 101-0021, Japan
- Area served: Worldwide
- Key people: Masaki Ikuta (Chairman); Hisataka Ikuta (President)
- Products: Automobile and motorcycle parts Carburetors; Fuel injectors Aircraft parts Nursing beds Lawn mowing equipment
- Revenue: ▲¥98,500,000,000 (FY 2014) (US$819.8 million) (FY 2014)
- Net income: ▲¥2,990,000,000 (FY 2014) (US$24.9 million) (FY 2014)
- Number of employees: 15,745 (as of September 30, 2020)
- Website: Official website

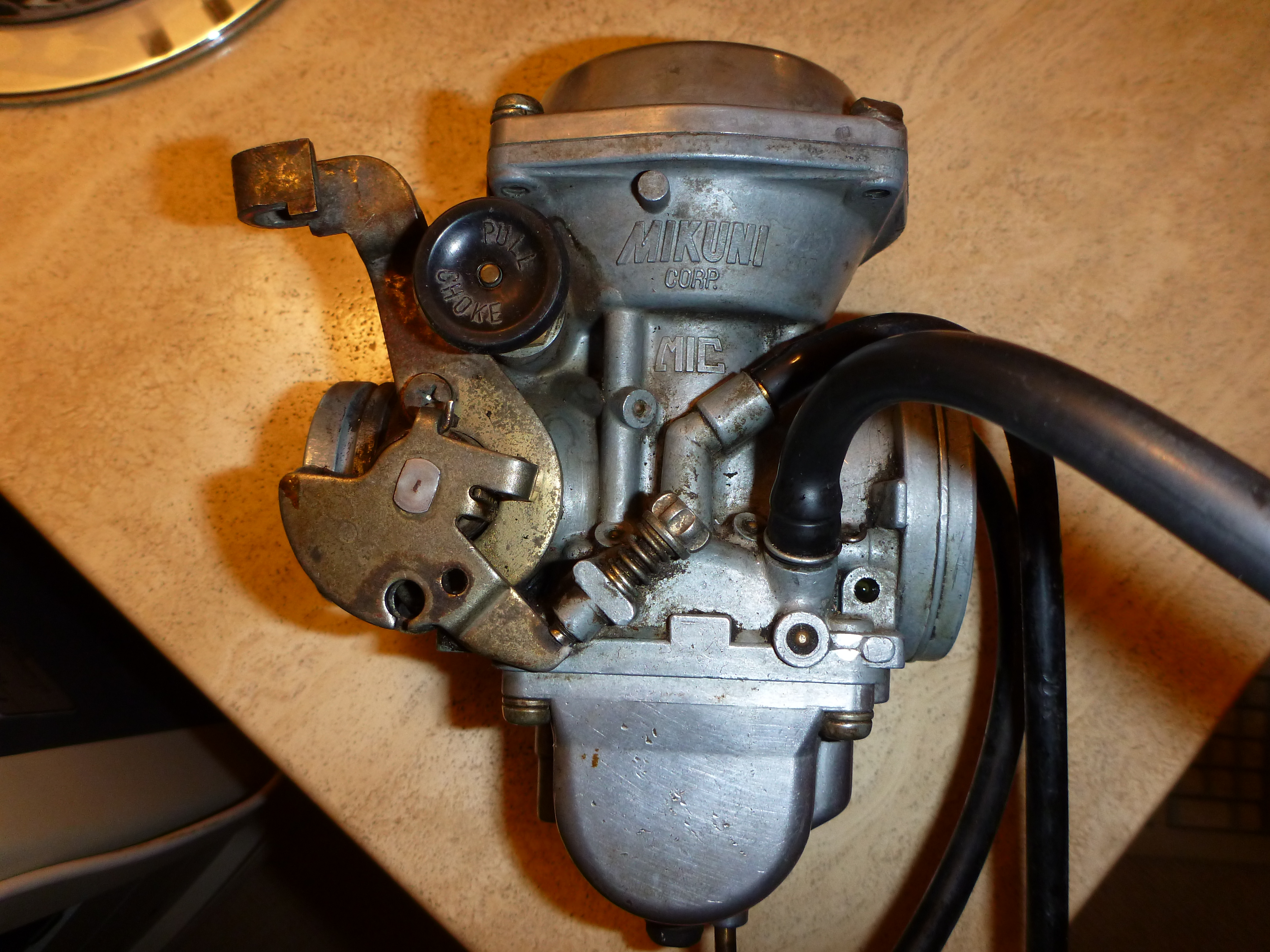
Mikuni carburettor BS 36 SS from a Suzuki motorcycle

Mikuni Corporation (株式会社ミクニ, Kabushiki gaisha Mikuni) is a Japanese Automotive products manufacturing company. Their business activities is focused on carburetors, fuel injectors and other automobile and motorcycle related equipment.

== History and description ==
The firm was founded in 1923 and incorporated in 1948.

The company is best known for supplying carburetors to many major Japanese motorcycle manufacturers. It is also known for its licensed copies of Solex carburetors that were also used on several Japanese cars.

Mikuni operates in Southeast Asia, especially in Thailand and Indonesia with motorcycle, scooter, and moped manufacturers Yamaha, Suzuki, Hyosung Motors & Machinery Inc., TVS Motor Company and Honda.
