= Atsushi Oyagi =

Japan international rugby union player

- Born: August 15, 1961 (age 65) Ukyō-ku, Kyoto Prefecture, Japan
- Height: 6 ft 3 in (1.91 m)
- Weight: 233 lb (106 kg)
- School: Fushimi Technical High School, Canterbury College, Christchurch
- University: Doshisha University
- Occupation(s): Commentator, Tarento

Rugby union career
- Position: Lock
Amateur team(s)
Years	Team	Apps	(Points)
-	Doshisha University Rugby Football Club		
Senior career
Years	Team	Apps	(Points)
1985–1991	Kobelco Steelers		
International career
Years	Team	Apps	(Points)
1983–1991	Japan	30	(12)

Atsushi Oyagi (大八木淳史, Ōyagi Atsushi) (born August 15, 1961, in Ukyō) is a former rugby union player who played as lock, rugby commentator, tarento, educator and school corporate president. He is 190 cm tall. He is affiliated to Shochiku Geino.

== Career ==
Hailing from Kyoto, he first played at Fushimi Technical High School Rugby Football Club, trained by Yoshiharu Yamaguchi, who currently serves as OB president. After graduating from high school, he went to Doshisha University. Contributing to his university rugby team's victory in the National University Championship with Seiji Hirao while playing for Doshisha University Rugby Football Club. He became the cornerstone of the same three consecutive victories that would be the first in the history.

While studying at Doshisha University, he also studied abroad, at the Canterbury College in Christchurch, New Zealand. He was pleaded by Seiji Hirao to return playing for Doshisha University Rugby Club while coming back from his study abroad in New Zealand and won the National University Championship for the fourth time. However, at the Japanese championship, his team finished 5th, losing to Nippon Steel Kamaishi.

About his career, he got acquainted with the then Kobe Steel president Sokichi Kametaka, who invited him and Oyagi joined the company, thus playing for the company's rugby club. Since then, he has played an active part as a central member of the seventh victory against Nippon Steel Kamaishi. He played 30 matches for Japan. Currently, he works as a high school student committee member of the Japan Rugby Football Union.

== International career ==
He debuted for Japan in a match against Oxford and Cambridge at Tokyo, on September 25, 1983. He was also part of the 1987 and 1991 Rugby World Cups.

== After career ==
After retiring from Kobe Steel, he is still active in the instruction and the spreading of rugby, while also acting as tarento (affiliated to Shochiku Geino) in each media. From 2005, he graduated from Doshisha University Graduate School Policy Science and conducted a research on "Building a sports club by a top athlete ~ Perspectives on youth development". He is currently enrolled in the latter doctoral course at the same graduate school from April 2007. In the same year, he was appointed general manager of the Kogya High School Rugby Club and Kyoto City Social Education Committee. In April 2008 he became a visiting professor at Kagawa University. In April 2008 he became a visiting professor at Kagawa University and then, Oyagi retired from General Manager of Rugby Club of Kochi Central Secondary School in December 2011. In January 2012, he was appointed Professor at Ashiya University and also became a leader "Ashiya Gakuen Sports Modernism Project". As of July 1, 2012, he was appointed as Ashiya Gakuen Junior High School and High School principal. And also from April 1, 2013, Oyagi was appointed principal of Ashiya University attached preschool kindergarten concurrently. In addition, he was appointed general manager of the National High School Physical Education League Boxing Specialist. In March 2014 he became the president of the school corporation Ashiya Gakuen (Ashiya Gakuen Junior High School, high school principal, as well Ashiya University Kindergarten). He resigned as president of the school corporation on October 25, 2016.

== Books ==
- "Genki no Naka ni: Keep on running" (Alice, 1997) ISBN 4-7520-0077-6
- "Tomo yo: Rugby is rugby" (Diamond, 1998) ISBN 4-478-96061-5
- "Yume wo ikasu: Nekketsu shitei no jissen-teki kosodate" (Kodansha, 2001) ISBN 4-06-211002-4 (Co-authored with Yoshiharu Yamaguchi)
- "Life Skill kyōiku: Sports wo tōshite tsutaeru "ikiru chikara"" (Showadou, 2009) (Co-authored)
- "Rugby kōchō taibatsu to kyōiku o atsuku kataru" (Shogakukan 101 New Book, 2013)

== Television ==
=== Dramas ===
- Toshiie to Matsu – (2002, NHK, Taiga drama) (Adachi Rokube, episodes 5 and 6)
- Taika no Kaishin (January 3, 2005, NHK Kodai-shi Drama Special) (Kan Nao)
- Hanazono Old Boy (January 1, 2014, NHK Osaka/Kansai Local, aired nationwide on February 11)

=== News Programs/Information Programs ===
- Jimoto no hito ga oshieru! 2-Paku 3-nichi no tabi (Tabi Channel)
- Inochi no Hibiki (TBS)
- Nan de? Nan de? Sunday (2001, MBS TV)
- Furusato ZIP Tantei-dan (Kansai TV)
- Sunday Morning (TBS)
- Shinsō hōdō bankisha! (Nippon TV)
- Kansai jōhō Net ten. (Yomiuri TV)
- Crossup Gendai (NHK)
- Ohayō nichiyō shinryōsho (2014–2015, BS Nippon TV) (Dr. Ryunosuke Ishimura)
- Hiruobi! (TBS) (Thursday commentator)
- Marugoto Toshiritai! AtoZ (NHK BS Premium)

=== Sports programs ===
Below are the ABC Radio's sports programs where he regularly appeared in the rugby information corner "Mukimuki! No Side Gekijō" broadcast on Friday of the season.

- Genki Ichiban!! Bucchigiri Play Ball! (2002–2008)
- Red to Shiro no Oraiorai (2010)
- Sports ni bitatto (2011)

=== Commercials ===
- Kirin Lager Beer
- Toyobo Global Environment Series
