= Denis Shanagher =

US international rugby union player

- Born: October 17, 1956 (age 70)
- University: Stanford University
- Occupation: Attorney

Rugby union career
- Position: Center
International career
Years	Team	Apps	(Points)
1980–87	United States	9	(0)

Denis F. Shanagher (born October 17, 1956) is an American former international rugby union player.

== Biography ==
Shanagher is the son of Irish rugby player Denis Shanagher Sr, who captained Bective Rangers to a Leinster Cup title prior to emigrating to the United States, where he became an influential referee and rugby administrator.

A center, Shanagher captained Stanford University in varsity rugby, then played club rugby for San Francisco and Bay Area Touring Side (BATS). He gained nine caps for the United States during the 1980s and was flown to Australia in 1987 as an injury replacement for Mike Caulder at the Rugby World Cup.

Shanagher, an attorney by profession, was appointed to the USA Rugby Board of Directors in 2020.

== See also ==
- List of United States national rugby union players
