= Toshitaka Kimura =

Japan international rugby union player

- Born: June 25, 1963 (age 63) Hiroshima, Japan
- Height: 5 ft 11 in (1.80 m)
- Weight: 222 lb (101 kg)
- School: Hiroshima Industrial High School
- University: Doshisha University

Rugby union career
- Position: Prop
Senior career
Years	Team	Apps	(Points)
1984-1989	World		
International career
Years	Team	Apps	(Points)
1984-1987	Japan	10	(0)

Toshitaka Kimura (木村敏隆, Kimura Toshitaka), (born Hiroshima, 25 June 1963) is a Japanese former rugby union footballer who played as a prop. He is not related to fellow Japanese international Kenichi Kimura.

== Career ==
After graduating from Doshisha University, Kimura played for World in the All-Japan Rugby Company Championship. He was first capped for the Japan national team against France XV at Osaka on 30 September 1984. He was also present in the 1987 Rugby World Cup squad, where he played two matches. His last cap was against New Zealand XV in Tokyo on 1 November 1987, earning 10 international caps for Japan.
