= Seiji Kurihara =

Japanese rugby union footballer

- Born: November 16, 1964 (age 61) Ehime Prefecture, Japan
- School: Nitta High School
- University: Waseda University

Rugby union career
- Position: Lock
Amateur team(s)
Years	Team	Apps	(Points)
198?-1986	Waseda University RFC		
Senior career
Years	Team	Apps	(Points)
1986-1996	Suntory		
International career
Years	Team	Apps	(Points)
1986-1987	Japan	3	(0)

Seiji Kurihara (栗原誠治, Kurihara Seiji), (born Ehime Prefecture, 16 November 1964), is a former Japanese rugby union player. He played as lock.

== Career ==
After his graduation from Waseda University, with which he played in the Japan Rugby University Championship, he moved to Suntory, where he played the National Rugby Company Championship until the end of his career, in 1996. He was capped for Japan in the match against Scotland, at Murrayfield, on 27 September 1986. Kurihara was also in the 1987 Rugby World Cup roster, where he played only in the match against England at Sydney, on 30 May 1987, earning 3 international caps for Japan.
