= Pat Johnson (rugby union) =

US international rugby union player

- Born: Patrick Walter Johnson; March 17, 1960 (age 66) LaGrange, Georgia, United States

Rugby union career
- Position: Hooker
Senior career
Years	Team	Apps	(Points)
-	Louisville Rugby Club		
International career
Years	Team	Apps	(Points)
1987–1992	United States	16	(4)

Pat Johnson (born 17 March 1960) is a former American rugby union player. He played at Hooker for the United States at two World Cups, in 1987 and 1991. He made his test debut for the United States against Canada in Vancouver on 10 May 1987. His last test match was also against Canada in Denver, 13 June 1992.
