= Kevin Simms =

English rugby union footballer

Kevin Gerard Simms (born 25 December 1964 (age 61)) is an English former rugby union footballer; he gained 15 caps for England as a centre between 1985 and 1988. He played in the 1987 Rugby World Cup. He played club rugby for Liverpool St Helens and Wasps. During his career he captained the North of England against South Africa at Elland Road and the All Blacks at Anfield. He is now a GP in Liverpool.

Kevin Simms is the son of the rugby league (scrum cap-wearing) wing who played in the 1950s and 1960s for Lancashire, St. Helens (A-Team), Rochdale Hornets, Combined Odham/Rochdale Hornets (against New Zealand during the 1961 New Zealand rugby league tour of Great Britain and France) and Oldham; Trevor Simms (born 27 May 1940 (age 85)).
