= Roy Helu Sr. =

US international rugby union player

- Born: 1953 (age 72–73) Tonga
- Notable relative: Roy Helu (son)

Rugby union career
- Position: Centre
Senior career
Years	Team	Apps	(Points)
1981-1987	Old Blues RFC		
International career
Years	Team	Apps	(Points)
1981–1987	United States	12	(8)

Roy Helu Sr. (born 1953) is a Tongan-born American former rugby union player. He moved to the United States in 1974. He was a centre for the United States rugby union team and played in the 1987 Rugby World Cup. He earned 12 caps for his adopted country in his entire career, which spanned from 1981 to his last match in 1987 against Australia at the World Cup.

== Personal ==
He is the father of former Washington Redskins and Oakland Raiders running back Roy Helu.
