= Shinji Onuki =

Japan international rugby union player

- Born: March 16, 1962 (age 64) Tokyo, Japan
- University: Nippon Sport Science University

Rugby union career
- Position: Wing
Senior career
Years	Team	Apps	(Points)
198?-1987	Suntory		
International career
Years	Team	Apps	(Points)
1984-1987	Japan	15	(12)

Shinji Onuki (大貫慎二, Ōnuki Shinji) (born Tokyo 16 March 1962) is a former Japanese rugby union player. He played as a wing

== Career ==
After attending Nippon Sport Science University and graduating, Onuki started to play for Suntory in the All-Japan Rugby Company Championship, with which he played his entire career. His first international cap for Japan was in a match against France, at Osaka, on 30 September 1984. He was also part of the 1987 Rugby World Cup squad, where he played two matches, with his last cap being the pool stage match against England, at Sydney, on 30 May 1987, earning 15 international caps.
