= Dave Horton =

US international rugby union player

- Full name: David C. Horton
- Born: 30 September 1960 (age 66) Massachusetts, United States of America
- School: Amherst College
- University: University of Michigan; Massachusetts Institute of Technology
- Occupation(s): IT consultant, software developer

Rugby union career
- Position: Fly-half
Senior career
Years	Team	Apps	(Points)
–	University of Michigan RFC		
–	Boston RFC		
International career
Years	Team	Apps	(Points)
1986–87	United States	3	(9)

David C. Horton (born 30 September 1960) is an American former international rugby union player and currently, software developer. He played as a fly-half.

== Career ==
His first cap for United States was against Canada on 8 November 1986, in Tucson. He was part of the 1987 Rugby World Cup US squad, where he played the pool stage match against Australia at Ballymore Stadium, Brisbane. His last international cap was during the match against Canada, in Victoria on 14 November 1987. He also had an international cap for US Sevens in 1987 against Canada in 1987 as well.

== After career ==
After he ended his rugby union career, he worked for Ernst & Young in 1993 until 1995 as a management consultant, he then became the Vice President of Engineering for Open Development Corp four years before founding Pactolus Communications Software in 1999. He created Drachtio, an open-source VoIP framework for full-stack WebRTC and Jambonz, an open-source communication PaaS Jambonz for SIP.
