= Koji Yasumi =

Japanese rugby union player (born 1957)

- Born: July 13, 1957 (age 69) Tokyo, Japan
- Height: 171 cm (5 ft 7 in)
- Weight: 82 kg (181 lb)
- School: Hozen Senior High School

Rugby union career
- Position: Prop
Amateur team(s)
Years	Team	Apps	(Points)
-	Hozen Senior High School \ ru_clubyears = 1978-19		
Senior career
Years	Team	Apps	(Points)
–	Toyota Motors		
International career
Years	Team	Apps	(Points)
1986-1987	Japan	3	(0)

Koji Yasumi (八角浩司, Yasumi Kōji) (born Tokyo, 13 July 1957) is a former Japanese rugby union player. He played as prop. Currently, he works for the non-profit organisation Heroes.

== Career ==
Yasumi started his rugby career while playing for the rugby team of Hozen Senior High School, the college he attended. After graduating, in 1985, he joined Toyota Motors to play the All-Japan Rugby Company Championship. His first international cap was during the match against Canada, at Burnaby Lake, on 7 June 1986. He was also part of the 1987 Rugby World Cup squad, playing only the match against USA, where USA won against Japan for 21-18. His last international cap was in the match against New Zealand, at Osaka, on 25 October 1987, earning 3 international caps.
