= Tony Ridnell =

US international rugby union player

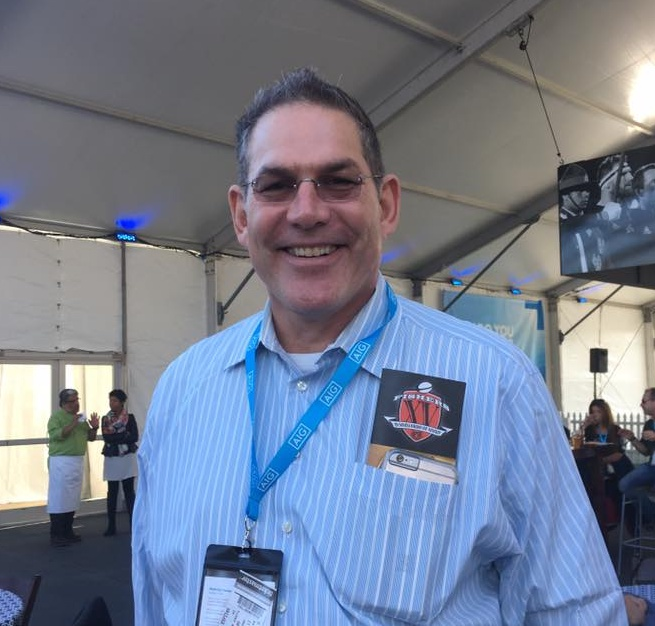
- Ridnell at the Rugby Weekend, Chicago, 2016
- Born: Anthony Morris Ridnell; January 1, 1961 (age 65) New York City, United States
- University: United States Military Academy
- Occupation(s): Founder and CEO of TRInternational, Inc.

Rugby union career
- Position: Number 8
International career
Years	Team	Apps	(Points)
1987–1993	United States	14	(4)

Tony Ridnell (born January 1, 1961, as Anthony Morris Ridnell) is an American businessman, former international rugby player, and army officer. He is the founder of TRInternational, Inc., a Chemical sales company.

== US Army ==
Upon graduating from West Point, Ridnell attended the Field Artillery Basic Course in 1982 at Fort Sill, OK. His first station was Schofield Barracks, HI, where he served as a platoon leader and fire support officer. At Schofield Barracks he continued to play rugby, and was selected for the Combined Services Rugby Team at the National Military Championships in 1984. Following the National Military Championships, the Combined Services Rugby Team toured England. In 1985 Ridnell attended the Field Artillery Advanced Course at Fort Sill, and later served as a Field Artillery Battery Commander stationed at Fort Lewis, WA. He left the service in 1988 to pursue a place in The Eagles, the United States national rugby union team.

== Rugby career ==
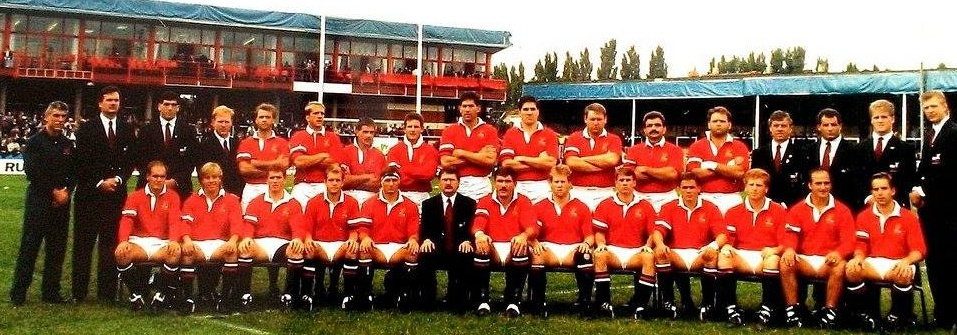
1991 USA Rugby World Cup Squad before their match against the All Blacks in Gloucester, England

In 1985, Ridnell was named to the United States national rugby union team, the Eagles, under coach Ron Mayes. Earning his first cap as Eagle No. 168 in his first match for Jim Perkins, he started at Blind-Side Flanker (No. 6) against Australia in the 1987 Rugby World Cup. In 1989, he would suffer a knee injury and have thoughts of never being able to play again. He returned to international play at the 1991 Rugby World Cup, starting against Italy at No. 8, losing 30-9 at Cross Green, England. Ridnell became an accomplished 7s player, leading the pack at every Hong Kong Sevens tournament from 1989 to 1993 under Eagles 7s Coach Emil Signes. Having established himself at the Canberra, Fiji, and Hong Kong Sevens Tournaments, he earned a spot representing the United States in the first Sevens World Cup.

His final international tournament was the 1993 Sevens World Cup, where he helped the United States earn a 31–0 victory over the Netherlands. Ridnell's final International 15s match came in 1993 against Canada at No. 5-Lock on 19 June 1993. Ridnell continued his international career, representing the Eagles on the 7s team until 1994. In total, he earned 14 International XV caps and 71 Sevens caps.

== Business career ==
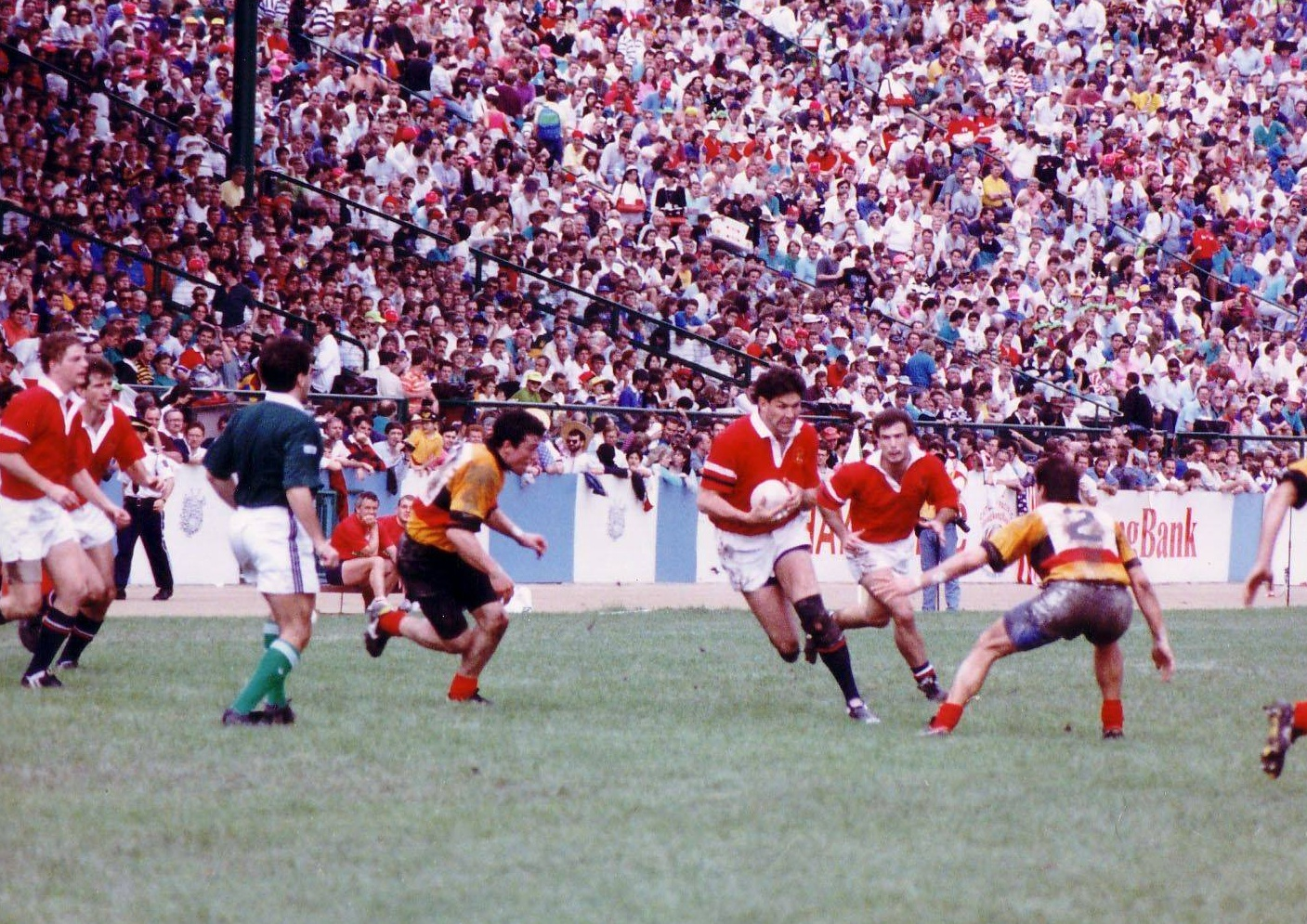
Tony Ridnell at the 1989 Hong Kong 7s

In 1988, Ridnell left the US Army in pursuit of a career in private industry. He founded TR International Trading Co. Inc. in 1994. In 2005, Tony Ridnell purchased a stake in Chemblend of America as part of his entrance into chemical manufacturing. From 2000 to 2008, he served on the board of directors for the National Association of Chemical Distributors, and in 2006, he joined the board of advisors for the Albers School of Business at Seattle University. In 2014, TRI International was ranked in the top 200 chemical distributors worldwide and in the top 60 in Latin America by the Independent Chemical Information Service with $45.2 million in revenue. TR International has been an A+-rated member of the Better Business Bureau since 2004.
