= John Mickel (rugby union) =

US international rugby union player

Rugby union career
- Position: Scrum-half
International career
Years	Team	Apps	(Points)
1986	United States	1	(0)

John Mickel is an American former international rugby union player.

A scrum-half, Mickel captained the Los Angeles Rugby Club and gained selection in 1986 on the Pacific Coast Grizzlies touring side to Argentina, subsequently making his Eagles debut in a Test against Canada that year in Tucson.

Mickel was a member of the U.S. team at the 1987 Rugby World Cup, as a replacement for an injury Dave Dickson.

== See also ==
- List of United States national rugby union players
