= Nippon Steel Kamaishi Seawaves =

Japanese rugby union club, based in Kamaishi

Nippon Steel Kamaishi Seawaves 日本製鉄釜石シーウェイブス
- Full name: Nippon Steel Kamaishi Seawaves
- Union: Japan Rugby Football Union
- Nickname: Kamaishi Seawaves
- Founded: 2001
- Region: Iwate Prefecture, Tōhoku
- Ground: Kamaishi City Stadium
- Coach: Yasuo Suda
- League(s): Japan Rugby League One, Division Two
- 2022: 5th

Official website
- www.kamaishi-seawaves.com

Nippon Steel Kamaishi Seawaves (commonly known as the Kamaishi Seawaves) is a Rugby union football club in Kamaishi, Iwate Prefecture, Japan. It was established in 2001.

At its inception, it was known as Nippon Steel Corporation Kamaishi.

== Current squad ==
The Kamaishi Seawaves squad for the 2026–27 season is:

Kamaishi Seawaves squad
**Props**: (Japan) Yūsuke Yamada; (Japan) Sei Matsuyama; (Japan) Yūtaro Yamaguchi; (South Korea) Lee Song-yong*; (Japan) Taiki Noguchi; (Japan) Riku Takahashi; (Japan) Rikyu Yamakawa; (Japan) Iwakami Ryo; **Hookers**: (New Zealand) Nesta Mahina**; (Tonga) Samisoni Asaeli*; (Japan) Daiki Ito; (Japan) Hayato Nishibayashi; **Locks**: (Tonga) **Mahonri Ngakuru**; (Japan) Yūga Suzuki; (Japan) Satoshi Hatazawa; (Australia) Connor Seve; (Samoa) **Ben Nee-Nee**; (Japan) Yūki Kikuchi	**Flankers**: (Japan) Ryota Kono (c); (Japan) Taichi Takahashi; (New Zealand) Angus Fletcher; (Japan) Taison Mogami; **No8s**: (Tonga) Sione Vuna*; (New Zealand) Sam Henwood*; **Scrum-halves**: (Japan) Atsushi Minami; (Japan) Yohei Murakami; (Japan) Takumi Tokairin; (Tonga) **Shinnosuke Tafokitau Oka****; **Fly-halves**: (New Zealand) Mitch Hunt; (Australia) Bryce Hegarty*	**Centres**: (Tonga) **Paula Mahe**; (Japan) Osuka-lloyd Murata; (Japan) Koki Saito; (South Africa) Gerdus van der Walt*; Mosese Tonga**; **Wingers**: (Japan) Larry Sulunga*; (New Zealand) Darius Thomas*; (Japan) Ryūji Abe; (Japan) Kodai Ono; (Japan) Gousuke Kawakami; (Japan) Ken Chiba; **Fullbacks**: (Japan) Soma Sugimoto; (Japan) Kaisei Takai; (Japan) Daiki Kon; **Utility Backs**
(c) Denotes team captain, **Bold** denotes player is internationally capped

== Notable players ==
The following former Kamaishi Seawaves players became Japanese internationals:

- Masayoshi Ito
- Koji Miyata
- Osamu Koyabu
- Toru Wada
- Kazuo Muraguchi
- Takeshi Hatakeyama
- Akemi Namura
- Ichiro Kobayashi
- Kiyoshi Segawa
- Jiro Ishiyama
- Yuji Matsuo
- Shigetaka Mori
- Hideo Kobayashi
- Koji Horaguchi
- Yoshihiko Sakuraba
- Michihito Chida
