= Fred Paoli =

US international rugby union player (born 1954)

- Born: Alfred Frank Paoli; February 18, 1954 (age 72) Paradise Valley, AZ
- University: Colorado State University

Rugby union career
- Position: Prop
Senior career
Years	Team	Apps	(Points)
1983-1991	Denver Barbarians		
International career
Years	Team	Apps	(Points)
1982–1991	United States	20	(0)

Alfred Frank "Fred" Paoli (born February 18, 1954) is an American former rugby union and American football player who played prop for the United States men's rugby national team and college football for Colorado State as a defensive lineman. During his rugby career, Paoli played 20 test matches for the USA Eagles but never scored a try. His final game was in 1991 against Italy in the 1991 Rugby World Cup.

Paoli is a trial attorney and is certified to practice law in Colorado and Montana.
