= Masaharu Aizawa =

Japan international rugby union player

Shogo Mukai
- Born: May 12, 1958 (age 68) Tokyo, Japan
- School: Kokugakuin Kugayama High School
- University: Meiji University

Rugby union career
- Position: Prop
Amateur team(s)
Years	Team	Apps	(Points)
- Meiji University RFC
Senior career
Years	Team	Apps	(Points)
1984-1990	Ricoh		
International career
Years	Team	Apps	(Points)
1984-1989	Japan	11	(0)

Masaharu Aizawa (相沢雅晴, Aizawa Masaharu) (born 12 May 1958, in Tokyo), is a former Japanese rugby union player who played as prop. Currently he works at the Non-profit organization MIP Sports Project.

== Career ==
After graduating from Meiji University, Aizawa joined Ricoh, where he played in the All-Japan Rugby Company Championship. He was first capped for the Japan national team in the match against Korea, in Fukuoka, on 27 October 1984. Aizawa was also in the 1987 Rugby World Cup roster, where he played only against Australia at Sydney, on 3 June 1987. His last cap was in the match against Korea, in Hong Kong, on 19 November 1989, earning international caps for Japan.
