= Daijiro Murai =

Japan international rugby union player

- Born: August 24, 1962 (age 64) Tokyo, Japan
- University: Keio University

Rugby union career
- Position: Fullback
Amateur team(s)
Years	Team	Apps	(Points)
-	Keio University RFC		
Senior career
Years	Team	Apps	(Points)
198?-1990	Marubeni		
International career
Years	Team	Apps	(Points)
1985-1987	Japan	8	(4)

Daijiro Murai (村井大次郎, Murai Daijirō) (born Tokyo, 24 August 1962) is a former Japanese rugby union player who played as a fullback.

== Career ==
After graduating from Keio University, Murai started playing for Marubeni in the All-Japan Rugby Company Championship. His first international cap for Japan was in a match against Ireland, at Osaka, on 26 May 1985. Murai was also part of the 1987 Rugby World Cup squad, where he played only the match against England, at Sydney, on 30 May 1987. In the same year, his last international cap was during a match against New Zealand, at Tokyo, on 1 November 1987, earning 8 caps for Japan.
