= Bill Campbell (rugby union) =

Australia international rugby union player

- Born: William Alexander Campbell; 28 November 1961 (age 64) Brisbane, Queensland
- Height: 2.02 m (6 ft 8 in)
- Weight: 118 kg (18 st 8 lb)
- University: Oxford

Rugby union career
- Position: Forward
Senior career
Years	Team	Apps	(Points)
	Queensland Reds	58	
International career
Years	Team	Apps	(Points)
- Australia

William Alexander Campbell (born 28 November 1961) is an Australian former rugby union player. He played 26 test matches for Australia in the position of lock from 1984 until 1990, and was vice-captain for 15 matches. He played 58 matches and captained 26 times (21 wins and five losses) for Queensland. Peter Jenkins named Campbell as one of the top 100 Wallabies in his book of the same name. Campbell ended his rugby career at 29 to further his medical studies and focus on his growing family.

== Career ==
After touring the United Kingdom with Australian Universities in 1984, William Campbell made his debut upon his return for both Queensland and the Wallabies. Campbell's debut for Queensland was the start of the 'tall-timber era', according to Ian Diehm in Red, Red, Red', when the state side had a number of tall forwards. Campbell was 202 cm and weighing in at 118 kilograms, Campbell. Following impressive performances for Queensland, Campbell was selected to make his international debut against Fiji in Suva the same year as a member of the 1984 Grand Slam Wallaby touring side. The Wallabies won the match 16 to 3. Campbell did not join the Wallabies again until 1986 when he played against Italy in Ballymore. He then went on to play against France and Argentina for both Queensland and the Wallabies in the same season.

During the same year, coach Alan Jones took the Wallabies into the Bledisloe Cup series. The Wallabies won the first Test match 13 to 12, the All Blacks won the second Test Match 13 to 12, with the Wallabies coming out on top after the third Test match, winning 22 to 9. This marked the first time the Wallabies won the Bledisloe Cup in New Zealand since 1949. The coach presented an inscribed photograph of Campbell, reaching for the ball in a line-out, thanking him for playing 'such a big role in our Bledisloe Cup victory'.

In 1987 Campbell was vice-captain of the Wallabies against South Korea, England, the US, and Japan. the Wallabies won all their pool matches and progressed to the quarter-finals against Ireland at Waratah Stadium on 7 June. The teaming of Campbell and Cutler once again achieved complete dominance at the line-outs and the pair were described as line-out gurus by Maxwell Howell. After winning the first three line-outs against France in the semi-final, Campbell was substituted after suffering ligament damage. Australia lost to France 30 to 24.

In 1989, the British Lions toured Australia and Campbell was selected as captain of the Queensland side and vice-captain of the Wallabies. He played all three Tests against the Lions but the visitors took the series 2–1.

Campbell retired in early 1991 to concentrate on his medical studies. He sat his surgical primary the day after the Wallabies won the 1991 World Cup.

== Personal life ==
Campbell was born at the Mater hospital, Brisbane on 28 November 1961 to parents Noela and William Snr Campbell. He was the fifth of eight children. He attended Villa Nova College in his early school years and then moved to Gregory Terrace, where he progressed through age group rugby. After Terrace, Campbell studied medicine at Queensland University aiming at a profession of Vascular Surgeon where he attained Fellowship of the Royal Australasian College of Surgeons in general surgery and vascular surgery.

In 1980 at the age of 19, Campbell married his childhood sweetheart Lynne Irwin in Brisbane. Lynne gave birth to daughters Lauren in 1981 (now wife of former Australia lock Mark Chisholm) and Natalie in 1985, and a son, Alexander, in 1987.

Straight after the 1987 World Cup, Campbell headed to England with his young family on a one-year Kobe Steel scholarship at St Catherine's College, Oxford, and played for the university team.

In early 1991, with Australia gearing up for what would prove to be a successful quest to raise the Webb Ellis trophy for the first time, Campbell quit at the age of 29 to focus on his family and medical studies. From 1993 to 1995, while still studying the fine form of vascular surgery, Campbell worked in the less advantaged areas of Nambour and Cairns. During this time, Lynne gave birth to his fourth child, daughter Madeleine in 1993.

He was posted to Melbourne in 1998 where he worked for the Royal Melbourne Hospital, the Alfred Hospital and the Epworth. In 2009 he became one of the first vascular surgeons in Australia to use less invasive surgical procedures such as (UGS) ultrasound guided sclerotherapy and endovenous laser ablation of varicose veins. He now owns two private practices with his wife in Melbourne, at The Epworth Centre and at Como Private Hospital.
