= Martin Green (rugby union coach) =

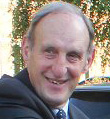
- School: Solihull School
- University: University of Cambridge
- Occupation: School teacher

Rugby union career
Coaching career
- Years: Team
- 1985–1987: England

Martin Green is an English former rugby union player who coached England in the late 1980s.

== Education and career ==
Green was educated at Solihull School and Christ's College, Cambridge, where he completed Part II of the economics tripos in 1967. Thereafter, from 1970 to 2005, he was an economics teacher at the fee-paying Warwick School.

== Rugby career ==
Green, a flanker in his playing days, captained Cambridge University to victory in the 1967 Varsity Match and had several injury plagued seasons with Birmingham club Moseley. He retired in 1975 but continued as a coach and led Moseley to the 1981–82 John Player Cup title. Following an apprenticeship with the England U-23s, Green succeeded Dick Greenwood as England coach in 1985, starting with a tour of New Zealand. He led England in the 1987 Rugby World Cup, the inaugural edition of the tournament. England lost in the quarter-finals to Wales and Green was soon replaced as coach by Geoff Cooke.
