= Toshiro Yoshino =

Japan international rugby union player

- Born: October 5, 1960 (age 66) Ibaraki, Japan
- School: Hitachi First High School, Ibaraki Prefecture
- University: Waseda University

Rugby union career
- Position(s): Wing, Centre
Amateur team(s)
| Years | Team | Apps | (Points) |
| - | Doshisha University RFC | | |
Senior career
| Years | Team | Apps | (Points) |
| 1985-1996 | Suntory | | |
International career
| Years | Team | Apps | (Points) |
| 1985-1987 | Japan | 7 | (0) |

Toshiro Yoshino (吉野俊郎, Yoshino Toshiro) (born Ibaraki, 5 September 1960) is a former Japanese rugby union player. He played as a wing or as centre.

== Career ==
After graduating from Hitachi First High School in Ibaraki Prefecture, Yoshino attended Waseda University.

During his time in Waseda University RFC, Yoshino, along with Kazuhiko Honjo and Makoto Tsubuku, was one of the "three crows" and became a star player. At that time, he often played as centre, but he also excelled in running, there were a few cases where he received a pass from Honjo and scored a try. Later, he had also opportunities to play as a winger.

Then, along with Honjo, he moved to Suntory and, upon joining the team, they could play for the same team which then was an emerging team at the Japan Company Rugby Football Championship, raising its strength.

However, through the university and the company, he had a chance to win the National Championship, and it was in 1995, at the age of 35.

Suntory was in the first round of the All Japan Rugby Championship against Kobe Steel, who was in the seventh consecutive match of the tournament. Despite the 20–20 draw, he had the right to enter the semi-finals being the top try scorer of the tournament, preventing Kobe Steel's eighth consecutive win. Suntory then, won against Toshiba Fuchu in the semi-finals. In the final match against Sanyo Electric, both sides tied 27-27, but since Suntory had the higher number of tries, they had the right to participate in the Japan Rugby Football Championship. Yoshino was a big success in the competition and played in both matches won against Toshiba Fuchu and in the match against Sanyo Electric, where he played as wing, scoring three tries in each game. After that, he was also part of the Waseda squad who defeated Meiji University at the All-Japan University Rugby Championship.

During his transfer to Suntory Osaka head office, his activities in the club ended, but he continued to play for Rokko Club, winning the All-Japan Club Rugby Football Championship in 1999.

== International career ==
Yoshino had his first cap for the Japan team on 21 April 1985, against USA in Tokyo. He was also called up for the 1987 Rugby World Cup squad, but never played any match in the tournament. His last cap for Japan was against New Zealand, in Osaka, on 25 October 1987

== Anedoctes ==
Shiryu Ito, who was in charge as commentator of the 1995 Japan Company Rugby Championship final match for TV Asahi, shouted The 35 years old, Yoshino! (35歳！吉野！, Sanjugo-sai! Yoshino!) every time Yoshino scored a try.
