= Gary Rees =

English rugby union player and coach

Gary William Rees (Born Long Eaton, 2 May 1960 (age 64)) is a former English rugby union player. He played as a flanker.

Rees played his entire career at Nottingham R.F.C., from 1977/78 to 1993/94. He then started an assistant coach career at the same team.

He had 23 caps for England, from 1984 to 1991, scoring 2 tries, 8 points in aggregate. He played in four Five Nations Championship competitions, in 1986, 1987, 1988 and 1989. He was called for the 1987 Rugby World Cup, playing in four games, and the 1991 Rugby World Cup, playing in a single game, that would be the last from his international career, aged 31 years old.
