= Hisataka Ikuta =

Japan international rugby union player

- Born: November 20, 1962 (age 63) Tokyo, Japan
- University: Keio University
- Occupation(s): Mikuni CEO and president

Rugby union career
- Position: Scrum-half
Amateur team(s)
Years	Team	Apps	(Points)
- Keio Senior High School
–	Keio University RFC		
Senior career
Years	Team	Apps	(Points)
1986-1989	Mitsubishi Sagamihara DynaBoars		
International career
Years	Team	Apps	(Points)
1987	Japan	4	(0)

Hisataka Ikuta (生田久貴, Ikuta Hisataka) is a former Japanese rugby union player, and currently CEO and president of Mikuni.

== Career ==
After attending Keio University kindergarten, Keio Futsubu School, and Keio Senior High School, Ikuta went to Keio University, where he played rugby. Although his team ended fourth at the Kanto University Rugby Tournament group in 1985 during his fourth year. In the away match against Kanto University RFC, where Keio won the qualification to the National High School Rugby Football Championship. As result of the seeding, held in the following day, after the victory of the title in the National High School Championship, Ikuta won the right to participate to the Japan students' national team. He won the championship with Keio, after defeating Meiji University in the final, where both teams won, resulting in a 12-12 tie. At the 23rd Japanese Championship, held on 15 January 1985, Keio University defeated Toyota Motors for 18-13, with a university side winning the championship for the first time in 10 years, since when Meiji University won the title in 1975. Ikuta was one of the leading rugby players in Japan, who helped the sport to influence the sports media, which took up the sport extensively. After graduating from Keio University, Ikuta started to play for Mitsubishi Motors, although he was not involved in the National Rugby Company Championship, but he was later called up in the Japanese national team. In 1987, he was in the 1987 Rugby World Cup roster, he played against USA, at Brisbane and against Australia, at Sydney. However, after the appearance at the World Cup, he retired as professional rugby player, later, playing only tournaments between Waseda, Keio and Meiji. Then, in 2008, he went to Mikuni, where his father, Masaki Ikuta, served as chairman. In 2008, after his father, he assumed office as CEO and Chairman of the company.
