= Toshiyuki Hayashi =

Japan international rugby union player

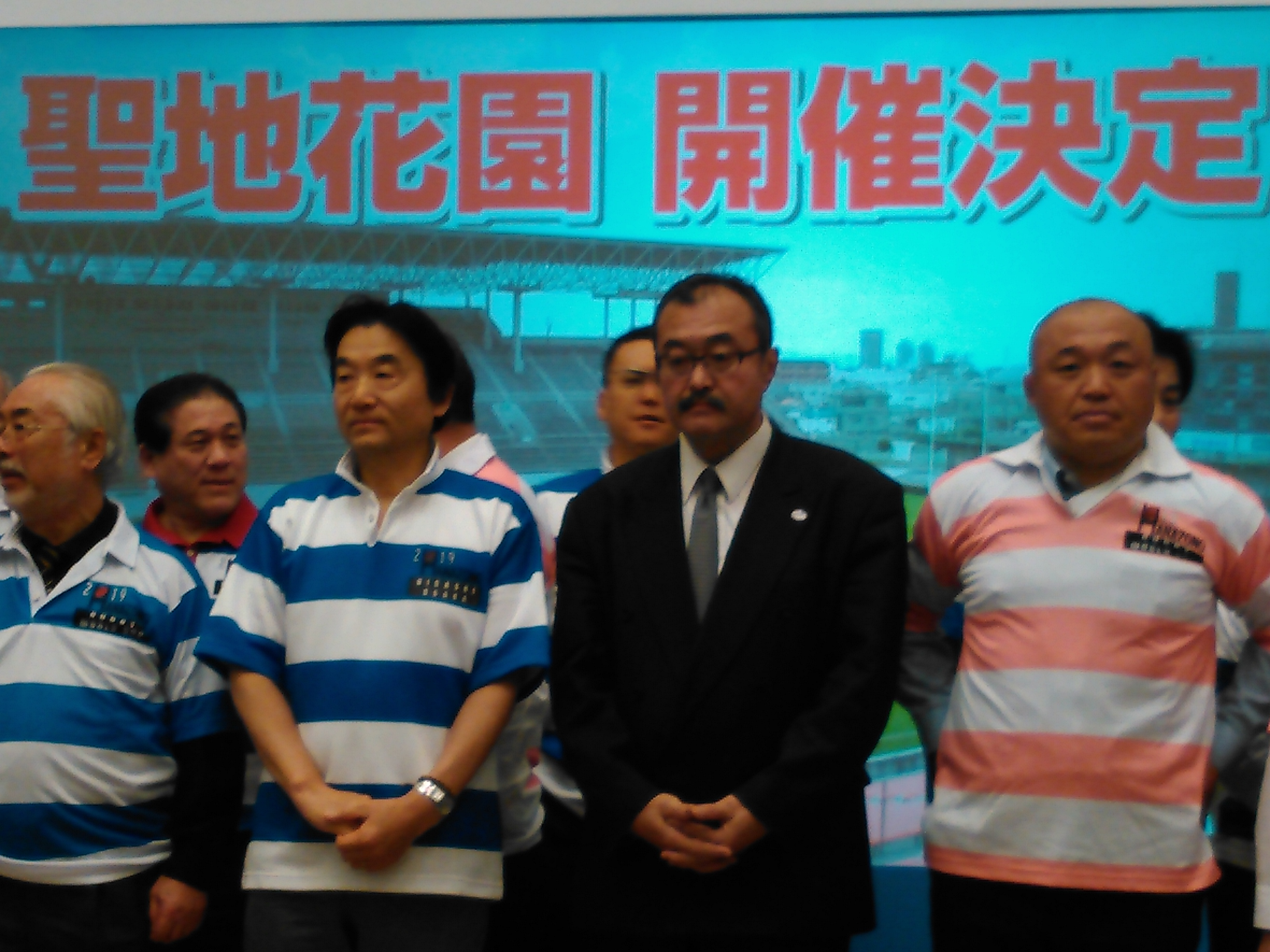
- Toshiyuki Hayashi in 2015 (third from left)
- Born: February 8, 1960 (age 66) Tokushima, Japan
- Height: 6 ft 0 in (1.83 m)
- Weight: 227 lb (103 kg)
- School: Johoku High School, Tokushima
- University: Doshisha University

Rugby union career
- Position(s): Prop, Lock
Amateur team(s)
Years	Team	Apps	(Points)
1975-1978	Johoku High School		
1978-1979	Doshisha University Rugby Football Club		
Senior career
Years	Team	Apps	(Points)
1980-1997	Kobelco Steelers		
International career
Years	Team	Apps	(Points)
1980–1992	Japan	38	(12)
Coaching career
- Years: Team
- 2005: Doshisha University Rugby Football Club

Toshiyuki Hayashi (林敏之, Hayashi Toshiyuki) (born 8 February 1960 in Tokushima) is a former Japanese rugby union player. He played as a prop and as a lock. He was educated at Tokushima Prefectural Johoku High School and was graduated in economics at Doshisha University. He was nicknamed Destroyer (壊し屋, Kowashiya) and Daimaru (ダイマル, Daimaru).

== Career ==
Hayashi played at Kobelco Steelers.

He had 38 caps for Japan, scoring three tries, 12 points in aggregate. His first game was at 19 October 1980, in a 23–3 loss to France XV, in Toulouse and his last came at 26 September 1992, in a 37–9 win over Hong Kong, in Seoul, for the Asian Championship. Hayashi played at the 1987 Rugby World Cup, being the captain in all the three matches, and at the 1991 Rugby World Cup. He was replaced this time by Seiji Hirao as the captain, but played once again in the three matches, scoring a try in the 32–16 defeat to Ireland, at 9 October 1991, in Dublin. In 1990 he studied at Oxford University and also participated in regular matches for Oxford against Cambridge University (Varsity match) and was also elected among the Oxford best 15 (Three of the 19th century players with 120 years of history are included) being the only non-British player elected, a feat achieved by the former All Blacks captain David Kirk, who was missing in the selection. He was also chosen to play for the Barbarians in 1992, becoming the first Japanese player to be invited in the Babaas.

== After career ==
In 2005 he coached Doshisha University Rugby Football Club.

Currently, he is affiliated to Kobelco Career Development and he is also the chairman of the nonprofit organization Heroes.

Gospellers' hit song "Towa ni", which composed by Takeshi Senoo (a supporter of Kobelco Steelers), who dedicated it to Hayashi at the time when he retired.
