= Shogo Mukai =

Japan international rugby union player

- Born: October 2, 1961 (age 65) Iyo, Ehime Prefecture, Japan
- School: Nitta High School
- University: Tokai University

Rugby union career
- Position: Fullback
Senior career
Years	Team	Apps	(Points)
1985-1994	Toshiba		
International career
Years	Team	Apps	(Points)
1985-1988	Japan	13	(0)
Coaching career
- Years: Team
- 1994-2000: Toshiba Brave Lupus
- 2001-2003: Japan
- 2004-2012: Coca-Cola Red Sparks

Shogo Mukai (向井昭吾, Mukai Shōgo), (born Iyo, October 2, 1961) is a Japanese former rugby union coach who coached the Japan national rugby union team from 2001 up to the 2003 Rugby World Cup.

Mukai played as a full back and won 13 caps for the Japan national rugby union team between 1985 and 1988 and played at the 1987 Rugby World Cup.

After retiring from his playing career in 1994, he became coach of the Toshiba Brave Lupus whom he led to three consecutive national titles from 1997 and 1999. His success with Toshiba Brave Lupus led to him to be appointed as coach of the Japan national team in December 2000 after Seiji Hirao resigned.

He led the side up to the 2003 Rugby World Cup, where Japan put up some credible performances against Scotland and France but ultimately finished the tournament winless. He stepped down after the tournament to spend more time with his family. He finished his time as Japan coach with a record of 9 wins in 24 matches.

After leaving his post with Japan, he became coach of the Coca-Cola Red Sparks in 2004. He led them to promotion to the Top League in 2006 where they stayed until they were relegated in 2012. This was Mukai's last season in charge as he handed over the reins to new coach Satoshi Yamaguchi and moved into a directors role at the club.

During his time as a coach, Mukai was renowned for employing an attacking game plan.

== See also ==
- Hiroaki Shukuzawa
- John Kirwan

Sporting positions
Preceded by (Japan) Seiji Hirao	Japan National Rugby Union Coach; 2001–2003	Succeeded by (Japan) Mitsutake Hagimoto
