= Yasuharu Kawase =

Japan international rugby union player

- Born: June 15, 1959 (age 67) Osaka, Japan
- School: Osaka Institute of Technology
- University: Meiji University
- Occupation: Teacher at Setsunan University

Rugby union career
- Position: Flanker
Youth career
- Meiji University RFC
Senior career
Years	Team	Apps	(Points)
1980-1988	Toshiba Fuchu		
- Osaka Teachers Rugby Football Team
International career
Years	Team	Apps	(Points)
1982-1987	Japan	10	(0)
Coaching career
- Years: Team
- Japan U21
- –: Japan U23
- –: Japan A
- –: Japan Students
- –: Kansai representative team
- –: Setsunan University RFC

Yasuharu Kawase (河瀬泰治, Kawase Yasuharu), (born Osaka, 15 June 1959) is a former Japanese rugby union player who played as flanker. He is a former Japanese international and served as the forwards coach of the Japanese national team, as well as head coach for the Japanese U21 and U23 national teams. Kawase was also appointed as Japan selection coach, Japan A national team coach, head coach of the Japan students national team, as well as Kansai representative coach. Currently, he coaches Setsunan University RFC (inaugurated in 1986), which plays in the Kansai University Rugby Football Leagues' A League. Additionally, he teaches at Setsunan University.

== Career ==
Hailing from Osaka Prefecture, Yasuharu Kawase attended high school at the Osaka Institute of Technology and graduated from Meiji University. In the professional league, Kawase played his entire career for Toshiba Fuchu, as well for Osaka Teachers Rugby Football Team.

Known for his powerful charges, he was known as "The Monster" (怪物, Kaibutsu) and "Wonder Boy" (怪童, Kaidō).

== Personal life ==
His son, Ryosuke Kawase, is also a rugby player; currently playing for Tokyo Sungoliath after graduating from Waseda University.

== International career ==
Kawase earned his first cap for Japan in 1982 against New Zealand Universities in Pukekohe on 30 May 1982. He was also part of the 1987 Rugby World Cup roster, playing only in the pool match against Australia in Sydney on 3 June 1987, which marked his last cap for Japan. He eaned 10 international caps overall.
