= Minoru Okidoi =

Japan international rugby union player

- Born: 7 February 1965 (age 61) Fukuoka, Japan
- Height: 174 cm (5 ft 9 in)
- Weight: 80 kg (176 lb)
- University: Fukuoka Institute of Technology

Rugby union career
- Position: Wing
Amateur team(s)
Years	Team	Apps	(Points)
19??-198?	Fukuoka Institute of Technology		
Senior career
Years	Team	Apps	(Points)
198?-198?	Suntory		
International career
Years	Team	Apps	(Points)
1987	Japan	4	(2)

Minoru Okidoi (沖土居稔, Okidoi Minoru) (born 7 February 1965 in Fukuoka) is a former Japanese rugby union player who played as a winger.

== Biography ==
Graduated in the Fukuoka Institute of Technology, with which he played the All-Japan Rugby University Championship, until he joined Suntory to play the All-Japan Rugby Company Championship. He was also capped in the Japan national team in 1987, in the 1987 Rugby World Cup match against Australia, at Sydney, where he scored a drop goal. His last cap was also in 1987, against New Zealand at Tokyo, on 1 November 1987. He also played for Japan Universities national team and for Kyushu representative team.
