= Rick Bailey =

US international rugby union player

- Born: June 25, 1954 (age 72)
- School: Napa High School
- University: University of California

Rugby union career
- Position: Prop
Amateur team(s)
Years	Team	Apps	(Points)
197?-1972	Napa High RFC		
Senior career
Years	Team	Apps	(Points)
1972-1979	Cal Golden Bears		
1979-1987	Old Blue R.F.C.		
International career
Years	Team	Apps	(Points)
1979–1987	United States	11	(0)

Rick Bailey (born June 25, 1954) is a former American rugby union player who represented the United States national team eleven times between 1979 and 1987. Playing at prop, he made three appearances at the inaugural Rugby World Cup in 1987. He did not score an international try during his career. In September 2015 he was awarded the Craig Sweeney Award, which is awarded by the United States Rugby Foundation to "an individual who had played for the Eagles, who was respected by his peers and the rugby community, has made significant contributions back to the game following his playing career, and be a person of exemplary character."
