= Dave Dickson =

US international rugby union player

- Born: November 29, 1959 (age 66)
- School: New Trier High School
- University: Vanderbilt University
- Occupation: Engineer

Rugby union career
- Position: Scrum-half
International career
Years	Team	Apps	(Points)
1986–87	United States	2	(0)

Dave Dickson (born November 29, 1959) is an American former international rugby union player.

A scrum-half, Dickson began playing rugby during his time at New Trier High School in Winnetka, Illinois. He competed on the Vanderbilt University varsity team while studying for an engineering degree, then moved to North Carolina for work at the beginning of the 1980s and joined the Olde Originals club, which he went on to captain.

Dickson featured twice in capped matches for the United States, debuting in a draw against Japan in 1986, before travelling to Australia with the national team for the 1987 Rugby World Cup. His only appearance in the tournament came against the Wallabies and he had to leave the field with a badly broken arm that left bone sticking out of his skin.

== See also ==
- List of United States national rugby union players
