= John Everett (rugby union) =

US international rugby union player

- Born: March 22, 1957 (age 69)

Rugby union career
- Position: Hooker
Senior career
Years	Team	Apps	(Points)
1984-1987	Old Blue R.F.C.		
International career
Years	Team	Apps	(Points)
1984–1987	United States	7	(0)

John Everett (born 22 March 1957) is a former American rugby union player. Everett played at the inaugural 1987 Rugby World Cup. He debuted for the Eagles against Canada in Chicago on June 9, 1984. He made his last appearance for USA against England at the 1987 World Cup in New Zealand.

Everett is the forwards coach for Saint Mary's Gaels men’s rugby team.
