= Gary Lambert =

American rugby union and rugby league player, poker player, and chiropractor

Personal information
- Born: January 21, 1959 (age 66) United States
- Height: 6 ft 3 in (1.91 m)
- Weight: 230 lb (100 kg)

Playing information

Rugby league
Representative
Years	Team	Pld	T	G	FG	P
1996	United States	-	-	-	-	-

Rugby union
- Position: Flanker
Club
Years	Team	Pld	T	G	FG	P
	White Plains
Representative
Years	Team	Pld	T	G	FG	P
1981–1990	United States	18	3	0	0	12

Gary Lambert (born 1959) is an American rugby union and rugby league player, poker player and chiropractor who represented the United States in the 1987 Rugby World Cup.

Lambert attended Louisiana State University.

== Playing career ==
Lambert originally played rugby union for the White Plains Rugby Football Club. He represented the United States in 18 tests, including at the 1987 Rugby World Cup, and also captained the national side.

Lambert later switched to rugby league, playing for the United States in the 1996 Super League World Nines tournament.

Lambert has played poker since 1992 and won a World Series of Poker Circuit event in 2011.
