= Steve Finkel =

US international rugby union player

- Full name: Stephen Finkel
- Born: January 23, 1953 (age 73)
- University: Ohio University

Rugby union career
- Position: Flanker
International career
Years	Team	Apps	(Points)
1981–87	United States	6	(0)

Stephen Finkel (born January 23, 1953) is an American former international rugby union player and coach.

Finkel was a Scioto Valley RFC product and played on the varsity team at Ohio University.

A flanker, Finkel represented the United States in the inaugural edition of the Hong Kong Sevens and was capped six times for the Eagles XV during the 1980s, with two appearances at the 1987 Rugby World Cup in Australia.

Finkel was the Ohio State University head rugby coach from 1988 to 1991, then took charge of the United States men's national rugby sevens team, which he coached to the 1993 Rugby World Cup Sevens.

In 2017, Finkel was inducted into the US Rugby Hall of Fame.

== See also ==
- List of United States national rugby union players
