= Mitsutake Hagimoto =

Japan international rugby union player

- Born: February 10, 1959 (age 67) Wakayama Prefecture, Japan
- School: Hotoku Gakuen High School
- University: Doshisha University

Rugby union career
- Position: Scrum-half
Amateur team(s)
Years	Team	Apps	(Points)
????-1982	Doshisha University RFC		
Senior career
Years	Team	Apps	(Points)
1982-1991	Kobe Steel		
International career
Years	Team	Apps	(Points)
1987	Japan	1	(0)
Coaching career
- Years: Team
- 1991-1998: Kobe Steel
- 2002: Japan women's
- 2003-2005: Japan
- 2006-2007: Japan U19
- 2007-2009: NTT Docomo Kansai
- 2009: Japan women's

Mitsutake Hagimoto (萩本 光威, Hagimoto Mitsutake) (born 10 February 1959 in Wakayama Prefecture) is a former Japanese rugby player and coach . He played as scrum-half.

== Career ==
Hagimoto began playing rugby since the elementary school at 4 years. He graduated from Hotoku Gakuen High School and from Doshisha University. With Doshisha, he won the University championship at the end of his fourth year in university. In 1982, Hagimoto joined Kobe Steel, playing in the company's rugby club and contributing to the team's best in Japan. He had a cap for Japan in the 1987 Rugby World Cup, during the pool match against England, at Sydney. When Masami Horikoshi joined Kobe Steel in 1991, then, Hagimoto went back to support the team. In 1998, he took office as head coach. He had the second place in the Japanese Championship. In 2002, Hagimoto led Japan women's national rugby union team in the 2002 Women's Rugby World Cup as head coach. Between 2004 and 2005 he was the coach of the Japanese national team. Later, he worked as coach of the Japan under-19 national rugby union team. After coaching NTT Docomo Kansai, he was reappointed as Japan women's national rugby union team's head coach in 2009. Currently, Hagimoto works for Kobe Steel, in the Kobe Head Office Secretary Public Relations Department.

Sporting positions
Preceded by (Japan) Shogo Mukai	Japan National Rugby Union Coach; 2004–2005	Succeeded by (France) Jean-Pierre Élissalde
