= Kevin Swords =

US international rugby union player (born 1960)

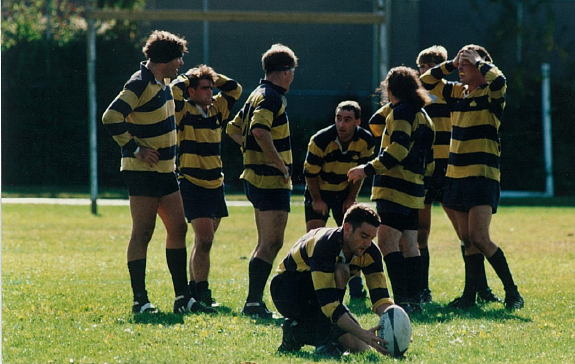
- Kevin Swords (far left) in action for the Beacon Hill Rugby Club circa 1994
- Born: Kevin Robert Swords; July 1, 1960 (age 66) Chicago, Illinois
- Height: 6 ft 7 in (2.01 m)
- Weight: 260 lb (120 kg)
- University: College of the Holy Cross
- Notable relative: Brian Swords Carolyn Swords[ Rev.Raymond J. Swords, S.J. ]

Rugby union career
- Position: Lock
Amateur team(s)
Years	Team	Apps	(Points)
1985–86	Washington RFC		
–	Boston RFC		
–	Old Blue RFC		
–	Barbarians		
International career
Years	Team	Apps	(Points)
1985–1994	United States	36	(8)

Kevin Robert Swords (born July 1, 1960) is an American rugby player. He won 36 caps between 1985 and 1994, and was the first American to play for the Barbarians. His brother Brian Swords also played for the Eagles as a lock. Brian, a much revered competitor and teammate introduced Kevin to Rugby while they both attended the College of the Holy Cross. Kevin Swords is the nephew of former president of the College of the Holy Cross, Rev. Raymond J. Swords, S. J., and the uncle of Carolyn Swords.

Swords made his debut against Japan in 1985 and played in both the 1987 and 1991 World Cups, captaining the Eagles in the latter.

In 2002, he was made an honorary member of the Holy Cross Varsity Club Hall of Fame. In 2014, he was inducted into the United States Rugby Federation Hall of Fame.
