= Brian Vizard =

US international rugby union player

- Born: July 4, 1959 (age 67)

Rugby union career
- Position: Number 8
International career
Years	Team	Apps	(Points)
1986–1991	United States	22	(0)

Brian Gerard Vizard (born July 4, 1959) is an American former rugby union player who was captain of the U.S. national rugby team and made 22 appearances for the United States national team.

== Playing career ==
Vizard got his first cap for the U.S. national team on May 31, 1986, in a match against Japan in Torrance, CA. Vizard played for the U.S. during the 1987 Rugby World Cup. Vizard made 20 starts at Number 8 and two starts at flanker. In 1990, Vizard was named captain of the United States national team. He captained the national team in eight internationals and on tours to Australia, Japan and the 1991 Rugby World Cup in England. He retired from full international play following the 1991 World Cup.

In 1986 Vizard made his debut for the United States national sevens team of which he went on to appear in 21 international sevens matches. His last sevens international appearance was at the 1993 Sevens Rugby World Cup.

Vizard began playing rugby in 1978 with the Grand Rapids Gazelles Rugby Club. During his 11 years playing with OMBAC the club won National Club Championship titles in 1988, '89, '91, '93 and '94, and National Sevens Championships in 1985 and 1995. Vizard retired from club rugby at OMBAC in 1995 at the age of 36.

== Other rugby activities ==
Vizard served as executive director of the Rugby Super League from 1996 to 1999. He served on the USA Rugby's Board of Directors from 1996 to 1998. Vizard has also worked as a co-host and color commentator for The Rugby Club, a weekly two-hour broadcast airing on Fox Sports World.

Vizard has been the executive director of the U.S. Rugby Foundation since July 2004. He handles the operations of the Foundation and works with the Foundation Committees.
