= Mike Saunders (rugby union) =

US international rugby union player

- Born: May 17, 1959 (age 67)
- University: San Diego State University

Rugby union career
- Position: Scrum-half
International career
Years	Team	Apps	(Points)
1987–89	United States	12	(8)

Mike Saunders (born May 17, 1959) is an American former international rugby union player.

A native of Monterey, California, Saunders got his start in rugby at the United States Naval Academy in 1979. He played varsity rugby for San Diego State University and was a long-serving captain of Old Mission Beach Athletic Club.

Saunders, a scrum-half, captained the Junior Eagles against the visiting Japanese in 1986 and the following year earned full representative honors when he debuted for United States national team. At the 1987 Rugby World Cup in Australia, Saunders appeared in all three pool matches, which included a fixture against the host country in Brisbane. He became team captain in 1988 and led his country for a series of matches in the Soviet Union.

During the mid-1990s, Saunders served as head coach of the United States men's national rugby sevens team.

Saunders was a 2018 inductee into the US Rugby Hall of Fame.

== See also ==
- List of United States national rugby union players
