= Mike Caulder =

US international rugby union player

- Full name: Michael Caulder
- Born: August 15, 1959 (age 67) Liverpool, England

Rugby union career
- Position: Fly-half
International career
Years	Team	Apps	(Points)
1984–89	United States	3	(4)

Michael Caulder (born August 15, 1959) is an American former international rugby union player.

Caulder was born to an American father in Liverpool, England.

Based in Florida, Caulder played fly-half on the United States national team during the 1980s, gaining three caps. He was in the American team for the 1987 Rugby World Cup but succumbed to an ankle injury and could take no part.

== See also ==
- List of United States national rugby union players
