= Joe Clarkson =

US international rugby union player

- Born: February 21, 1957 (age 69)
- University: Newcastle University

Rugby union career
- Position: Fly-half / Fullback
International career
Years	Team	Apps	(Points)
1986–87	United States	5	(13)

Joe Clarkson (born February 21, 1957) is an English-American former international rugby union player.

Clarkson played his early rugby in the north of England, as a fullback with Northern, Newcastle University, Northumberland, Headingley and Yorkshire, before relocating to the United States in the early 1980s.

While based in California, Clarkson represented the United States as a fly-half in five capped matches in 1986 and 1987, kicking all nine of the team's points on debut, to secure a draw against Japan. He made two appearances at the 1987 Rugby World Cup, including a match against his native England at Concord Oval, Sydney.

Clarkson began playing for Chicago Blaze in the fall of 1987.

== See also ==
- List of United States national rugby union players
