= Mike Purcell (rugby union) =

American rugby union player (born 1951)

- Born: December 6, 1951 (age 74) Erie, Pennsylvania, U.S.
- Height: 5 ft 11 in (1.80 m)
- Weight: 185 lb (84 kg)

Rugby union career
- Position: Wing
International career
Years	Team	Apps	(Points)
1980–1987	United States	14	(16)
Coaching career
- Years: Team
- Davis High School
- –: UC Davis

Mike Purcell (born December 6, 1951) played wing for the United States national rugby union team from 1980 to 1987, earning 14 caps and scoring 4 tries. The U.S. Rugby Foundation inducted Purcell into the United States Rugby Hall of Fame in 2015.

Purcell played for the U.S. at the inaugural 1987 Rugby World Cup where he scored two tries — the first in a victory over Japan, the other in a loss to England. Purcell also played for the U.S. national rugby sevens team. He played for the first U.S. sevens team at the 1981 Hong Kong Sevens, where he scored the U.S. team's first ever try.

Following his playing career, Purcell coached rugby. He has coached Davis High School. He was the head coach for the UC Davis Aggies, which won the 2015 Pac Western conference and the D1-AA national title.
