= Kevin Higgins (rugby union) =

US international rugby union player

- Full name: Kevin Gary Higgins
- Born: November 8, 1962 Buffalo, NY, United States
- Died: October 30, 1996 (aged 33) California, United States
- School: Mater Dei High School
- University: Cal Poly San Luis Obispo

Rugby union career
- Position: Center / Winger
International career
| Years | Team | Apps | (Points) |
| 1985–91 | United States | 28 | (16) |

Kevin Gary Higgins (November 8, 1962 – October 30, 1996) was an American international rugby union player.

Born in Buffalo, New York, Higgins attended Mater Dei High School, where he excelled in football and athletics.

Higgins played football at Cal Poly San Luis Obispo and was their leading rusher and scorer on an undefeated freshman side. In his sophomore year, Higgins made the switch to rugby union and became a three-time All-American.

A center and winger, Higgins competed on the United States national team from 1985 to 1991, earning his first international call up while still in college. His 28 caps, previously a national record, included matches at the 1987 and 1991 Rugby World Cups. He captained the United States on their 1989 tour of South America. As a rugby sevens player, Higgins featured in three editions of the Hong Kong Sevens. He played much of his club rugby for Old Mission Beach.

== See also ==
- List of United States national rugby union players
