= Seiji Hirao =

Japan international rugby union player

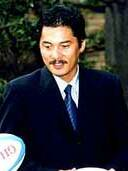
- Born: 21 January 1963 Kyoto, Japan
- Died: 20 October 2016 (aged 53)
- Height: 180 cm (5 ft 11 in)
- School: Fushimi Technical High School
- University: Doshisha University

Rugby union career
- Position(s): Fly-half, Center
Amateur team(s)
Years	Team	Apps	(Points)
1978-1981	Fushimi Technical High School		
1981-1985	Doshisha University		
1985-1986	Richmond		
Senior career
Years	Team	Apps	(Points)
1986-1998	Kobelco Steelers		
International career
Years	Team	Apps	(Points)
1982-1995	Japan	35	(18)
Coaching career
- Years: Team
- 1995-2006: Kobelco Steelers
- 1998-2000: Japan

Seiji Hirao (平尾誠二; 21 January 1963 – 20 October 2016) was a Japanese rugby union footballer and coach. He played as a fly-half, and was one of the most popular Japanese players of his time, earning the name of "Mr. Rugby".

== Biography ==
Hirao first played rugby at Fushimi Kogyo, in Kyoto, who won the national high school title in 1980. He then moved to Doshisha University, where he won three national university titles. He graduated in 1985, moving to England, where he played a year for Richmond. Returning to Japan in 1986, he helped Kobelco Steelers to win seven consecutive National Championships, from 1989 to 1995.

He had 35 caps for Japan, from 1982 to 1995, scoring 1 try, 5 conversions and 1 penalty, 18 points in aggregate. His first match was a 22-6 loss to New Zealand Universities national team, at 30 May 1982, aged only 19 years old. Hirao played at the 1987 Rugby World Cup, all the three matches. He also played at the 1991 Rugby World Cup, as the captain, again in all the three matches, and, after a three years and a half retirement, at the 1995 Rugby World Cup, playing two matches and scoring a try in the 50-28 loss to Ireland, at 31 May 1995. That would be his last cap for his National Team, aged 32 years old.

He was the coach of Japan, from 1997 to 2000, and led his National Team at the 1999 Rugby World Cup. Japan was unfortunate, losing all the three matches but giving worthy performances. He then went on to coach Kobelco Steelers. He died on 20 October 2016 at the age of 53 after battling bile duct cancer.

Sporting positions
Preceded by (Japan) Iwao Yamamoto	Japan National Rugby Union Coach; 1997–2000	Succeeded by (Japan) Shogo Mukai
