= Katsumi Miyaji =

Japan international rugby union player (1941–2026)

- Born: March 10, 1941 Osaka Prefecture, Japan
- Died: April 2026 (aged 85)
- School: Shijonaga High School
- University: Doshisha University
- Occupation: Owner of a landscaping business

Rugby union career
- Position: Prop
Amateur team(s)
Years	Team	Apps	(Points)
- Shijonaga High School
Senior career
Years	Team	Apps	(Points)
1960–1969	Sanyo Electric		
International career
Years	Team	Apps	(Points)
1969	Japan	1	(0)
Coaching career
- Years: Team
- 1978: Japan
- 1984: Japan
- 1987: Japan
- 1988: Sanyo Electric

Katsumi Miyaji (宮地克実, Miyaji Katsumi; March 10, 1941 – April 2026) was a Japanese rugby union player and coach. He played as a prop.

== Career ==
After attending Shijonaga High School, Miyaji headed to Doshisha University. In his university enrollment days, he joined at the second Japanese Association invited NHK Cup along with Yoshihiro Sakata and other players, winning against Kintetsu and virtually took part in rugby. Later, he got work in Sanyo Tokyo. Also, he took part in the Japan national rugby union team, with which he participated in the Asian championship in 1969, during the match against Hong Kong and won one cap.

After his retirement, he became the coach of Japan twice in 1978 and 1984. And after the resignation of his predecessor Hitoshi Oka, he took the lead for the third time as head coach for the Japan national team in the 1987 Rugby World Cup, taking the command during the tournament. Then, he took over as coach for Sanyo. Every year in the same period, he fought a nomination against Kobe Steel, which won most in Japan at that time. However, at Sanyo Electric (currently, Panasonic Wild Knights), through the players ad the coaching period, as he was not able to achieve the victory in the National Company Championship, he was known as "a Coach of Agony" (悲劇の名将, Higeki no meishō). He ran a landscaping business, as well, he worked on the development of Panasonic Wild Knights' training ground.

Nobuhiro Baba, the original author of the TV dorama School☆Wars is a junior student in Shijonaga High School and has been providing a large number of rugby-related materials for writing his work.

== Death ==
Miyaji died in April 2026, at the age of 85.

== Anecdotes ==
- At the final of the National Rugby Football Tournament on 8 January 1991, immediately after Sanyo Electric's unexpected loss against Kobe Steel, it is said that inside of his mind went blank.
- In the final match of the 45th Japan Rugby Football Championship tournament held in March 2008, after the defeat of Suntory Sungoliath, he visited Chichibunomiya Rugby Stadium in a sunny day. After the match, Miyaji cried, saying "Honma, it was longer". Furthermore, he was sought from Sanyo Fifteen and he was lifted up.

== Notes ==
Sporting positions
Preceded by (Japan) Ryo Saito	Japan National Rugby Union Coach; 1978	Succeeded by (Japan) Hisashi Yokoi

Sporting positions
Preceded by (Japan) Hiroshi Hibino	Japan National Rugby Union Coach; 1984–1985	Succeeded by (Japan) Hitoshi Oka

Sporting positions
Preceded by (Japan) Hitoshi Oka	Japan National Rugby Union Coach; 1987	Succeeded by (Japan) Hiroshi Hibino
