= 1991 Rugby World Cup squads =

This article lists the official squads for the 1991 Rugby World Cup that took place in England, Ireland, Scotland, Wales and France between 3 October and 2 November 1991.

Players marked (c) were named as captain for their national squad. All details, such as number of international caps and player age, are current as of the opening day of the tournament on 3 October 1991.

== Pool A ==
=== England ===
Head coach: (England) Geoff Cooke

Note: Flags indicate national union for the club/province as defined by World Rugby.

Player	Position	Date of birth (age)	Caps	Club/province
John Olver	Hooker	23 April 1961 (aged 30)	1	(England) Northampton
Brian Moore	Hooker	11 January 1962 (aged 29)	31	(England) Harlequins
Gary Pearce	Prop	3 February 1956 (aged 35)	35	(England) Northampton
Jason Leonard	Prop	14 August 1968 (aged 23)	9	(England) Harlequins
Paul Rendall	Prop	18 February 1954 (aged 37)	27	(England) Wasps
Jeff Probyn	Prop	27 April 1956 (aged 35)	24	(England) Wasps
Paul Ackford	Lock	26 February 1958 (aged 33)	17	(England) Harlequins
Nigel Redman	Lock	16 August 1964 (aged 27)	11	(England) Bath
Wade Dooley	Lock	2 October 1957 (aged 34)	41	(England) Preston
Michael Skinner	Flanker	26 November 1958 (aged 32)	13	(England) Harlequins
Peter Winterbottom	Flanker	31 May 1960 (aged 31)	43	(England) Harlequins
Gary Rees	Flanker	2 May 1960 (aged 31)	22	(England) Nottingham
Dean Richards	Number 8	11 July 1963 (aged 28)	27	(England) Leicester
Mike Teague	Number 8	8 October 1960 (aged 30)	17	(England) Gloucester
Richard Hill	Scrum-half	4 May 1961 (aged 30)	23	(England) Bath
Dewi Morris	Scrum-half	9 February 1964 (aged 31)	5	(England) Orrell
Rob Andrew	Fly-half	18 February 1963 (aged 28)	38	(England) Wasps
David Pears	Fly-half	5 December 1967 (aged 23)	2	(England) Harlequins
Will Carling (c)	Centre	12 December 1965 (aged 25)	26	(England) Harlequins
Jeremy Guscott	Centre	7 July 1965 (aged 26)	13	(England) Bath
Simon Halliday	Wing	13 July 1960 (aged 31)	16	(England) Harlequins
Nigel Heslop	Wing	4 December 1963 (aged 27)	7	(England) Orrell
Rory Underwood	Wing	19 June 1963 (aged 28)	45	(England) Leicester
Chris Oti	Wing	16 June 1965 (aged 26)	11	(England) Wasps
Jonathan Webb	Fullback	24 August 1963 (aged 28)	18	(England) Bath
Simon Hodgkinson	Fullback	15 December 1962 (aged 28)	13	(England) Nottingham

=== Italy ===
Head coach: (France) Bertrand Fourcade

Note: Flags indicate national union for the club/province as defined by World Rugby.

Player	Position	Date of birth (age)	Caps	Club/province
Carlo Orlandi	Hooker	1 November 1967 (aged 23)	0	(Italy) Rugby Lyons Piacenza
Giancarlo Pivetta	Hooker	18 June 1957 (aged 34)	42	(Italy) Benetton Rugby
Franco Properzi	Prop	4 November 1965 (aged 25)	7	(Italy) Amatori Rugby Milano
Massimo Cuttitta	Prop	2 September 1966 (aged 25)	9	(Italy) Amatori Rugby Milano
Guido Rossi	Prop	18 April 1959 (aged 32)	45	(Italy) Benetton Rugby
Giovanni Grespan	Prop	21 January 1967 (aged 24)	6	(Italy) Benetton Rugby
Carlo Checchinato	Lock	30 August 1970 (aged 21)	3	(Italy) Rugby Rovigo
Antonio Colella	Lock	4 September 1961 (aged 30)	41	(Italy) L'Aquila Rugby
Roberto Favaro	Lock	9 February 1965 (aged 26)	20	(Italy) Benetton Rugby
Giambattista Croci	Lock	28 July 1965 (aged 26)	7	(Italy) Amatori Rugby Milano
Massimo Giovanelli	Flanker	1 March 1967 (aged 24)	10	(Italy) Amatori Rugby Milano
Gianni Zanon (c)	Flanker	3 March 1960 (aged 31)	43	(Italy) Benetton Rugby
Alessandro Bottacchiari	Flanker	8 November 1955 (aged 35)	0	(Italy) L'Aquila Rugby
Roberto Saetti	Number 8	27 November 1967 (aged 23)	16	(Italy) Petrarca Rugby
Ivan Francescato	Scrum-half	10 February 1967 (aged 24)	4	(Italy) Benetton Rugby
Francesco Pietrosanti	Scrum-half	3 December 1963 (aged 27)	16	(Italy) L'Aquila Rugby
Diego Domínguez	Fly-half	25 April 1966 (aged 25)	6	(Italy) Amatori Rugby Milano
Stefano Barba	Centre	10 January 1964 (aged 27)	22	(Italy) Amatori Rugby Milano
Massimo Bonomi	Centre	22 June 1967 (aged 24)	10	(Italy) Amatori Rugby Milano
Paolo Vaccari	Centre	17 January 1971 (aged 20)	2	(Italy) Rugby Calvisano
Stefano Bordon	Centre	2 February 1968 (aged 23)	3	(Italy) Rugby Rovigo
Fabio Gaetaniello	Centre	25 August 1958 (aged 33)	27	(Italy) Rugby Parma F.C.
Marcello Cuttitta	Wing	2 September 1966 (aged 25)	17	(Italy) Amatori Rugby Milano
Edgardo Venturi	Wing	27 July 1962 (aged 29)	21	(Italy) Rugby Rovigo
Daniele Tebaldi	Fullback	24 April 1961 (aged 30)	15	(Italy) Rugby Parma F.C.
Luigi Troiani	Fullback	25 February 1964 (aged 27)	27	(Italy) L'Aquila Rugby

=== New Zealand ===
Head coaches: (New Zealand) John Hart and (New Zealand) Alex Wyllie

Note: Flags indicate national union for the club/province as defined by World Rugby.

Player	Position	Date of birth (age)	Caps	Club/province
Sean Fitzpatrick	Hooker	4 June 1963 (aged 28)	34	(New Zealand) Auckland
Steve McDowall	Prop	21 August 1961 (aged 30)	35	(New Zealand) Auckland
Graham Purvis	Prop	12 October 1961 (aged 29)	0	(New Zealand) Waikato
Graham Dowd	Prop	17 December 1963 (aged 27)	0	(New Zealand) North Harbour
Richard Loe	Prop	6 April 1960 (aged 31)	25	(New Zealand) Waikato
Ian Jones	Lock	17 April 1967 (aged 24)	11	(New Zealand) Northland
Gary Whetton (c)	Lock	15 December 1959 (aged 31)	52	(New Zealand) Auckland
Paul Henderson	Flanker	21 September 1964 (aged 27)	1	(New Zealand) Otago
Michael Jones	Flanker	8 April 1965 (aged 26)	19	(New Zealand) Auckland
Mark Carter	Flanker	7 November 1968 (aged 22)	1	(New Zealand) Auckland
Andy Earl	Flanker	12 September 1961 (aged 30)	9	(New Zealand) Canterbury
Alan Whetton	Flanker	15 December 1959 (aged 31)	30	(New Zealand) Auckland
Zinzan Brooke	Number 8	14 February 1965 (aged 26)	9	(New Zealand) Auckland
Graeme Bachop	Half-back	11 June 1967 (aged 24)	13	(New Zealand) Canterbury
Jason Hewett	Half-back	17 October 1968 (aged 22)	0	(New Zealand) Auckland
Jon Preston	Half-back	15 November 1967 (aged 23)	0	(New Zealand) Canterbury
Grant Fox	First five-eighth	6 June 1962 (aged 29)	31	(New Zealand) Auckland
Craig Innes	Centre	10 September 1969 (aged 22)	11	(New Zealand) Auckland
Walter Little	Centre	14 October 1969 (aged 21)	10	(New Zealand) North Harbour
Bernie McCahill	Centre	28 June 1964 (aged 27)	6	(New Zealand) Auckland
Va'aiga Tuigamala	Wing	4 September 1969 (aged 22)	0	(New Zealand) Auckland
John Kirwan	Wing	16 December 1964 (aged 26)	40	(New Zealand) Auckland
Terry Wright	Wing	21 March 1963 (aged 28)	26	(New Zealand) Auckland
Shayne Philpott	Fullback	21 September 1965 (aged 26)	0	(New Zealand) Canterbury
John Timu	Fullback	8 May 1969 (aged 22)	3	(New Zealand) Otago
Kieran Crowley	Fullback	31 August 1961 (aged 30)	18	(New Zealand) Taranaki

=== United States ===
Head coach: (England) Jim Perkins

Note: Flags indicate national union for the club/province as defined by World Rugby.

Player	Position	Date of birth (age)	Caps	Club/province
Tony Flay	Hooker	15 January 1964 (aged 27)	5	(United States) Old Puget Sound Beach R.F.C.
Pat Johnson	Hooker	17 March 1960 (aged 31)	13	(United States) Louisville Rugby Club
Christopher Lippert	Prop	31 March 1963 (aged 28)	12	(United States) OMBAC
Lance Manga	Prop	20 July 1956 (aged 35)	4	(United States) South Jersey R.F.C.
Norm Mottram	Prop	30 June 1959 (aged 32)	6	(United States) Boulder R.F.C.
Fred Paoli	Prop	18 February 1954 (aged 37)	19	(United States) Denver Barbarians RFC
Bill Leversee	Lock	2 June 1964 (aged 27)	11	(United States) OMBAC
Kevin Swords (c)	Lock	1 July 1960 (aged 31)	26	(United States) Old Blue R.F.C.
Chuck Tunnacliffe	Lock	10 June 1964 (aged 27)	1	(United States) Bowling Green State University R.F.C.
Rob Farley	Flanker	29 December 1962 (aged 28)	13	(United States) Philadelphia Whitemarsh RFC
Shawn Lipman	Flanker	25 September 1964 (aged 27)	6	(United States) Santa Monica Rugby Club
Mark Sawicki	Flanker	26 October 1962 (aged 28)	4	(United States) Chicago Lions
Jay Wilkerson	Flanker	25 January 1966 (aged 25)	0	(United States) Belmont Shore RFC
Brian Vizard	Number 8	4 July 1959 (aged 32)	21	(United States) OMBAC
Tony Ridnell	Number 8	1 January 1961 (aged 30)	9	(United States) Army R.F.C.
Barry Daily	Scrum-half	15 March 1962 (aged 29)	11	(United States) Denver Barbarians RFC
Mark Pidcock	Scrum-half	31 October 1961 (aged 29)	1	(United States) OMBAC
Chris O'Brien	Fly-half	5 August 1964 (aged 27)	14	(United States) University of California R.F.C.
Mike de Jong	Fly-half	16 October 1962 (aged 28)	7	(United States) Denver Barbarians RFC
Joe Burke	Centre	9 February 1961 (aged 30)	7	(United States) Chicago Lions
Kevin Higgins	Centre	8 November 1962 (aged 28)	26	(United States) OMBAC
Mark Williams	Centre	26 June 1961 (aged 30)	15	(United States) Gentlemen of Aspen RFC
Gary Hein	Wing	26 March 1965 (aged 26)	18	(United States) University of California R.F.C.
Eric Whitaker	Wing	24 September 1966 (aged 25)	18	(United States) Saint Mary's College R.F.C.
Ray Nelson	Fullback	11 June 1961 (aged 30)	23	(Scotland) Hutchesons' GSFP
Paul Sheehy	Fullback	14 August 1963 (aged 28)	0	(United States) Washington R.F.C.

== Pool B ==
=== Ireland ===
Head coach: (Ireland) Ciaran Fitzgerald

Note: Flags indicate national union for the club/province as defined by World Rugby.

Player	Position	Date of birth (age)	Caps	Club/province
Terry Kingston	Hooker	19 September 1963 (aged 28)	10	(Ireland) Munster Rugby
Steve Smith	Hooker	18 July 1959 (aged 32)	15	(Ireland) Ballymena R.F.C. / Ulster Rugby
Gary Halpin	Prop	14 February 1966 (aged 25)	1	(England) London Irish
Nick Popplewell	Prop	6 April 1964 (aged 27)	4	(Ireland) Greystones RFC / Leinster Rugby
Des Fitzgerald	Prop	20 December 1957 (aged 33)	29	(Ireland) Cork Constitution / Munster Rugby
Donal Lenihan	Lock	12 September 1959 (aged 32)	48	(Ireland) Cork Constitution / Munster Rugby
Mick Galwey	Lock	8 October 1966 (aged 24)	3	(Ireland) Munster Rugby
Neil Francis	Lock	17 March 1964 (aged 27)	12	(Ireland) Old Belvedere RFC / Leinster Rugby
Phillip Matthews (c)	Flanker	21 January 1960 (aged 31)	32	(Ireland) Wanderers FC / Ulster Rugby
Brian Robinson	Flanker	20 March 1966 (aged 25)	6	(Ireland) Ballymena RFC / Ulster Rugby
Gordon Hamilton	Flanker	13 May 1964 (aged 27)	5	North of Ireland F.C. / Ulster Rugby
Noel Mannion	Number 8	12 January 1963 (aged 28)	14	(Ireland) Galway Corinthians RFC / Connacht Rugby
Fergus Aherne	Scrum-half	16 March 1963 (aged 28)	12	(Ireland) Lansdowne F.C. / Leinster Rugby
Rob Saunders	Scrum-half	5 August 1968 (aged 23)	6	(England) London Irish
Ralph Keyes	Fly-half	1 March 1961 (aged 30)	1	(Ireland) Munster Rugby
Vince Cunningham	Centre	14 March 1967 (aged 24)	5	(Ireland) St Mary's College RFC / Leinster Rugby
David Curtis	Centre	10 April 1965 (aged 26)	5	(England) London Irish
Brendan Mullin	Centre	30 October 1963 (aged 27)	39	(Ireland) Blackrock College RFC / Leinster Rugby
Pat O'Hara	Wing	4 August 1961 (aged 30)	10	(Ireland) Cork Constitution / Munster Rugby
Keith Crossan	Wing	29 December 1959 (aged 31)	37	(Ireland) Ulster Rugby
Simon Geoghegan	Wing	1 September 1968 (aged 23)	5	(England) London Irish
Jack Clarke	Wing	2 September 1968 (aged 23)	3	(Ireland) Dolphin RFC / Munster Rugby
Kenny Murphy	Fullback	21 July 1966 (aged 25)	9	(Ireland) Cork Constitution / Munster Rugby
Jim Staples	Fullback	20 October 1965 (aged 25)	5	(England) London Irish

=== Japan ===
Head coach: (Japan) Hiroaki Shukuzawa Manager: (Japan) Shigeru Konno

Note: Flags indicate national union for the club/province as defined by World Rugby.

Player	Position	Date of birth (age)	Caps	Club/province
Tsuyoshi Fujita	Hooker	27 January 1961 (aged 30)	31	(Japan) IBM R.F.C.
Masahiro Kunda	Hooker	29 September 1966 (aged 25)	5	(Japan) Toshiba Fuchu
Osamu Ota	Prop	23 March 1965 (aged 26)	12	(Japan) NEC
Masanori Takura	Prop	30 September 1966 (aged 25)	8	(Japan) Mitsubishi Heavy Industries Sagamigahara
Kenichi Kimura	Prop	29 December 1968 (aged 22)	0	(Japan) Toyota Motors
Kazuaki Takahashi	Prop	31 January 1968 (aged 23)	6	(Japan) Toyota Motors
Toshiyuki Hayashi	Lock	8 February 1960 (aged 31)	34	(Japan) Kobe Steel
Atsushi Oyagi	Lock	15 August 1961 (aged 30)	28	(Japan) Kobe Steel
Ekeroma Luaiufi	Lock	8 May 1963 (aged 28)	8	(Japan) NikoNikoDo
Hirofumi Ouchi	Flanker	26 January 1968 (aged 23)	2	(Japan) Ryukoku University R.F.U.
Hiroyuki Kajihara	Flanker	28 September 1966 (aged 25)	10	(Japan) Toshiba Fuchu
Katsufumi Miyamoto	Flanker	19 March 1966 (aged 25)	8	(Japan) Sanyo Electric
Shuji Nakashima	Flanker	8 July 1963 (aged 28)	10	Japan Electric
Sinali Latu	Number 8	22 August 1965 (aged 26)	16	(Japan) Sanyo Electric
Masami Horikoshi	Scrum-half	27 November 1968 (aged 22)	11	(Japan) Kobe Steel
Wataru Murata	Scrum-half	25 January 1968 (aged 23)	1	(Japan) Kobe Steel
Shinobu Aoki	Fly-half	26 January 1968 (aged 23)	4	(Japan) Ricoh
Katsuhiro Matsuo	Fly-half	6 January 1964 (aged 27)	14	(Japan) World Co.
Eiji Kutsuki	Centre	25 December 1962 (aged 28)	22	(Japan) Toyota Motors
Seiji Hirao (c)	Centre	21 January 1963 (aged 28)	29	(Japan) Kobe Steel
Yukio Motoki	Centre	27 August 1971 (aged 20)	3	(Japan) Meiji University R.F.C.
Terunori Masuho	Wing	29 January 1972 (aged 19)	2	(Japan) Waseda University R.F.C.
Yoshihito Yoshida	Wing	18 February 1969 (aged 22)	13	(Japan) Isetan
Tsutomu Matsuda	Wing	30 April 1970 (aged 21)	0	(Japan) Kanto Gakuin University R.F.U.
Takahiro Hosokawa	Fullback	1 April 1967 (aged 24)	5	(Japan) Kobe Steel
Tatsuya Maeda	Fullback	23 September 1968 (aged 23)	3	(Japan) NTT Kansai R.F.C.

=== Scotland ===
Head coach: (Scotland) Ian McGeechan

Note: Flags indicate national union for the club/province as defined by World Rugby.

Player	Position	Date of birth (age)	Caps	Club/province
John Allan	Hooker	25 November 1963 (aged 27)	4	(Scotland) Edinburgh Academical F.C.
Kenny Milne	Hooker	1 December 1961 (aged 29)	4	(Scotland) Heriots FP
David Sole (c)	Prop	8 May 1962 (aged 29)	33	(Scotland) Edinburgh Academical F.C.
Paul Burnell	Prop	29 September 1965 (aged 26)	15	(England) London Scottish F.C.
David Milne	Prop	7 December 1958 (aged 32)	0	(Scotland) Heriots FP
Alan Watt	Prop	10 July 1967 (aged 24)	0	(Scotland) Glasgow High Kelvinside
Chris Gray	Lock	11 July 1960 (aged 31)	17	(England) Nottingham R.F.C.
Doddie Weir	Lock	4 July 1970 (aged 21)	2	(Scotland) Melrose RFC
John Jeffrey	Flanker	25 March 1959 (aged 32)	35	(Scotland) Kelso RFC
Finlay Calder	Flanker	20 August 1957 (aged 34)	29	(Scotland) Heriots FP
Graham Marshall	Flanker	23 May 1960 (aged 31)	3	(England) Wakefield RFC
Derek White	Number 8	30 January 1958 (aged 33)	31	(England) London Scottish F.C.
Gary Armstrong	Scrum-half	30 September 1966 (aged 25)	19	(Scotland) Jed-Forest RFC
Greig Oliver	Scrum-half	12 September 1964 (aged 27)	2	(Scotland) Hawick RFC
Craig Chalmers	Fly-half	15 October 1968 (aged 22)	17	(Scotland) Melrose RFC
Sean Lineen	Centre	25 December 1961 (aged 29)	18	(Scotland) Boroughmuir RFC
Scott Hastings	Centre	4 December 1964 (aged 26)	30	(Scotland) Watsonian FC
Graham Shiel	Centre	13 August 1970 (aged 21)	0	(Scotland) Melrose RFC
Iwan Tukalo	Wing	5 March 1961 (aged 30)	25	(Scotland) Heriots FP
Tony Stanger	Wing	14 May 1968 (aged 23)	14	(Scotland) Hawick RFC
Douglas Wyllie	Wing	20 May 1963 (aged 28)	11	(Scotland) Selkirk RFC
Gavin Hastings	Fullback	3 January 1962 (aged 29)	31	(Scotland) Watsonian FC
Peter Dods	Fullback	6 January 1958 (aged 33)	21	(Scotland) Gala RFC

=== Zimbabwe ===
Trainer: (Zimbabwe) Iain Buchanan Manager: (Zimbabwe) Alan Woldemar

Note: Flags indicate national union for the club/province as defined by World Rugby.

Player	Position	Date of birth (age)	Caps	Club/province
Brian Beattie	Hooker	16 April 1969 (aged 22)	0	(Zimbabwe) Old Miltonians RFC
Adrian Garvey	Hooker	25 June 1968 (aged 23)	2	(Zimbabwe) Old Miltonians RFC
Robin Hunter	Prop	25 September 1964 (aged 27)	0	unknown
Alex Nicholls	Prop	4 August 1958 (aged 33)	2	(Zimbabwe) Mashonaland
Gary Snyder	Prop	8 March 1972 (aged 19)	0	(Zimbabwe) Harare Sports Club
Chris Roberts	Prop	18 September 1967 (aged 24)	0	unknown
Michael Martin	Lock	25 December 1959 (aged 31)	3	unknown
Neville Kloppers	Lock	circa 1962	1	(Zimbabwe) Mashonaland
Rob Demblon	Lock	13 August 1966 (aged 25)	0	(Zimbabwe) Old Georgians RFC
Chris Botha	Lock	1 September 1968 (aged 23)	0	unknown
Brendon Dawson	Flanker	1 September 1968 (aged 23)	3	(Zimbabwe) Old Miltonians RFC
Darren Muirhead	Flanker	23 December 1965 (aged 25)	0	unknown
Brenton Catterall	Number 8	19 July 1969 (aged 22)	0	unknown
Honeywell Nguruve	Number 8	12 August 1969 (aged 22)	0	(Zimbabwe) Old Georgians RFC
Andy Ferreira	Scrum-half	26 June 1961 (aged 30)	6	(Zimbabwe) Old Georgians RFC
Ewan MacMillan	Scrum-half	3 January 1971 (aged 20)	0	(Zimbabwe) Old Georgians RFC
Craig Brown	Fly-half	1 February 1968 (aged 23)	1	(Zimbabwe) Harare Sports Club
Ralph Kuhn	Fly-half	8 February 1963 (aged 28)	1	unknown
Mark Letcher	Centre	14 October 1965 (aged 25)	3	(Zimbabwe) Old Hararians RFC
Ian Noble	Centre	6 April 1972 (aged 19)	0	(Zimbabwe) Old Miltonians RFC
Richard Tsimba	Centre	9 July 1965 (aged 26)	2	(Zimbabwe) Old Georgians RFC
Dave Walters	Wing	16 November 1968 (aged 22)	3	(Zimbabwe) Old Miltonians RFC
William Schultz	Wing	3 November 1968 (aged 22)	0	(Zimbabwe) Karoi
Elimon Chimbima	Wing	1 January 1969 (aged 22)	3	(Zimbabwe) Old Hararians RFC
Brian Currin (c)	Fullback	15 September 1960 (aged 31)	0	unknown

== Pool C ==
=== Argentina ===
Head coaches: (Argentina) Luis Gradín / (Argentina) Guillermo Lamarca

Note: Flags indicate national union for the club/province as defined by World Rugby.

Player	Position	Date of birth (age)	Caps	Club/province
Federico Méndez	Hooker	2 August 1972 (aged 19)	5	(Argentina) Marista Rugby Club
Ricardo Le Fort	Hooker	13 October 1965 (aged 25)	5	(Argentina) Tucumán Rugby Club
Mariano Bosch	Hooker	9 August 1962 (aged 29)	0	(Argentina) Olivos Rugby Club
Mariano Lombardi	Hooker	19 August 1968 (aged 23)	0	(Argentina) Asociación Alumni
Manuel Aguirre	Prop	28 July 1959 (aged 32)	2	(Argentina) Asociación Alumni
Luis Molina	Prop	3 November 1959 (aged 31)	11	(Argentina) Los Tarcos Rugby Club
Diego Cash	Prop	10 August 1961 (aged 30)	35	(Argentina) San Isidro Club
Pablo Buabse	Lock	27 March 1963 (aged 28)	2	(Argentina) Los Tarcos Rugby Club
Pedro Sporleder	Lock	2 January 1971 (aged 20)	6	(Argentina) Curupaytí
Agustín Zanoni	Lock	18 October 1966 (aged 24)	0	(Argentina) Club Pueyrredón
Germán Llanes	Lock	27 May 1968 (aged 23)	6	(Argentina) La Plata Rugby Club
Francisco Irarrázaval	Flanker	5 October 1971 (aged 19)	0	(Argentina) Club Newman
Pablo Garretón (c)	Flanker	26 June 1966 (aged 25)	24	(Argentina) Universitario Rugby Club de Tucumán
Mario Carreras	Flanker	14 April 1966 (aged 25)	4	(Argentina) Olivos Rugby Club
José Santamarina	Number 8	21 May 1963 (aged 28)	3	(Argentina) Tucumán Rugby Club
Gonzalo Camardón	Scrum-half	19 December 1970 (aged 20)	3	(Argentina) Asociación Alumni
Guillermo del Castillo	Fly-half	14 December 1963 (aged 27)	3	(Argentina) Jockey Club de Rosario
Lisandro Arbizu	Fly-half	29 September 1971 (aged 20)	5	(Argentina) Belgrano Athletic Club
Hernán García Simón	Centre	11 January 1965 (aged 26)	3	(Argentina) Club Pueyrredón
Eduardo Laborde	Centre	19 October 1967 (aged 23)	0	(Argentina) Club Pucará
Matías Allen	Centre	29 April 1968 (aged 23)	5	(Argentina) Club Atlético San Isidro
Diego Cuesta Silva	Wing	23 January 1963 (aged 28)	34	(Argentina) San Isidro Club
Martín Terán	Wing	25 July 1969 (aged 22)	3	(Argentina) Tucumán Rugby Club
Gustavo Jorge	Wing	24 October 1971 (aged 19)	6	(Argentina) Club Atlético San Isidro
Santiago Mesón	Fullback	25 January 1968 (aged 23)	11	(Argentina) Tucumán Rugby Club
Guillermo Angaut	Fullback	10 January 1965 (aged 26)	6	(Argentina) La Plata Rugby Club

=== Australia ===
Head coach: (Australia) Bob Dwyer

Note: Flags indicate national union for the club/province as defined by World Rugby.

Player	Position	Date of birth (age)	Caps	Club/province
Phil Kearns	Hooker	27 June 1967 (aged 24)	14	(Australia) Randwick DRUFC / New South Wales
David Nucifora	Hooker	15 January 1962 (aged 29)	0	(Australia) University of Queensland R.C. / Queensland
Dan Crowley	Prop	28 August 1965 (aged 26)	3	(Australia) Souths Rugby / Queensland
Tony Daly	Prop	7 March 1966 (aged 25)	14	(Australia) Eastern Suburbs RUFC / New South Wales
Ewen McKenzie	Prop	21 June 1965 (aged 26)	11	(Australia) Randwick DRUFC / New South Wales
Cameron Lillicrap	Prop	19 April 1963 (aged 28)	6	(Australia) Souths Rugby / Queensland
John Eales	Lock	27 June 1970 (aged 21)	4	(Australia) Brothers Old Boys / Queensland
Rod McCall	Lock	20 September 1963 (aged 28)	13	(Australia) Brothers Old Boys / Queensland
Steve Cutler	Lock	28 July 1960 (aged 31)	39	(Australia) Gordon RFC / New South Wales
Simon Poidevin	Flanker	31 October 1958 (aged 32)	54	(Australia) Randwick DRUFC / New South Wales
Jeff Miller	Flanker	4 July 1962 (aged 29)	23	(Australia) North Brisbane Rugby Club / Queensland
Brendon Nasser	Flanker	6 July 1964 (aged 27)	7	(Australia) University of Queensland Rugby Club / Queensland
Viliami Ofahengaue	Number 8	3 May 1968 (aged 23)	7	(Australia) Manly RUFC / New South Wales
Troy Coker	Number 8	30 May 1965 (aged 26)	5	(Australia) Wests Rugby / Queensland
Nick Farr-Jones (c)	Scrum-half	18 April 1962 (aged 29)	48	(Australia) Sydney University Football Club / New South Wales
Peter Slattery	Scrum-half	6 June 1965 (aged 26)	3	(Australia) University of Queensland Rugby Club / Queensland
Michael Lynagh	Fly-half	25 October 1963 (aged 27)	52	(Australia) University of Queensland Rugby Club / Queensland
David Knox	Fly-half	3 August 1963 (aged 28)	3	(Australia) Randwick DRUFC / New South Wales
Tim Horan	Centre	18 May 1970 (aged 21)	11	(Australia) Souths Rugby / Queensland
Jason Little	Centre	26 August 1970 (aged 21)	10	(Australia) Souths Rugby / Queensland
Richard Tombs	Centre	5 January 1968 (aged 23)	0	(Australia) Northern Suburbs Rugby Club / New South Wales
David Campese	Wing	21 October 1962 (aged 28)	58	(Australia) Randwick DRUFC / New South Wales
Bob Egerton	Wing	6 March 1963 (aged 28)	4	(Australia) Sydney University Football Club / New South Wales
John Flett	Wing	15 June 1963 (aged 28)	3	(Australia) Randwick DRUFC / New South Wales
Marty Roebuck	Fullback	10 January 1965 (aged 26)	4	(Australia) Eastwood Rugby Club / New South Wales
Anthony Herbert	Fullback	13 August 1966 (aged 25)	6	(Australia) GPS Rugby / Queensland

=== Wales ===
Head coach: (Wales) Alan Davies

Note: Flags indicate national union for the club/province as defined by World Rugby.

Player	Position	Date of birth (age)	Caps	Club/province
Garin Jenkins	Hooker	18 August 1966 (aged 25)	1	(Wales) Pontypool RFC
Ken Waters	Hooker	9 October 1961 (aged 29)	0	(Wales) Newbridge RFC
Mark Davis	Prop	18 September 1970 (aged 21)	1	(Wales) Newport RFC
Hugh Williams-Jones	Prop	10 January 1963 (aged 28)	4	South Wales Police RFC
Laurance Delaney	Prop	8 May 1956 (aged 35)	5	(Wales) Llanelli RFC
Mike Griffiths	Prop	18 March 1962 (aged 29)	15	(Wales) Cardiff RFC
Paul Arnold	Lock	28 April 1968 (aged 23)	8	(Wales) Swansea RFC
Phil May	Lock	1 July 1956 (aged 35)	6	(Wales) Llanelli RFC
Kevin Moseley	Lock	2 July 1963 (aged 28)	6	(Wales) Newport RFC
Phil Davies	Lock	19 October 1963 (aged 27)	29	(Wales) Llanelli RFC
Martyn Morris	Flanker	23 August 1962 (aged 29)	9	(Wales) Neath RFC
Richie Collins	Flanker	2 March 1962 (aged 29)	16	(Wales) Cardiff RFC
Richard Webster	Flanker	9 July 1967 (aged 24)	1	(Wales) Swansea RFC
Emyr Lewis	Number 8	29 August 1968 (aged 23)	4	(Wales) Llanelli RFC
Andy Booth	Scrum-half	8 December 1967 (aged 23)	0	(Wales) Cardiff RFC
Robert Jones	Scrum-half	10 November 1965 (aged 25)	40	(Wales) Swansea RFC
Tony Clement	Fly-half	8 February 1967 (aged 24)	13	(Wales) Swansea RFC
Adrian Davies	Fly-half	9 February 1969 (aged 22)	2	(Wales) Neath RFC
David Wyn Evans	Fly-half	1 November 1965 (aged 25)	10	(Wales) Cardiff RFC
Scott Gibbs	Centre	23 January 1971 (aged 20)	6	(Wales) Neath RFC
Mike Hall	Centre	13 October 1965 (aged 25)	14	(Wales) Cardiff RFC
Mark Ring	Centre	15 October 1962 (aged 28)	29	(Wales) Cardiff RFC
Arthur Emyr	Wing	27 July 1962 (aged 29)	10	(Wales) Cardiff RFC
Ieuan Evans (c)	Wing	21 March 1964 (aged 27)	24	(Wales) Llanelli RFC
Steve Ford	Wing	15 August 1965 (aged 26)	8	(Wales) Cardiff RFC
Mike Rayer	Fullback	21 July 1965 (aged 26)	0	(Wales) Cardiff RFC

=== Western Samoa ===
- Head coach: (Samoa) Peter Schuster
- Manager (Samoa) Lemalu Tate Simi

Note: Flags indicate national union for the club/province as defined by World Rugby.

Player	Position	Date of birth (age)	Caps	Club/province
Stan To'omalatai	Hooker	13 December 1962 (aged 28)	20	(Samoa) Vaiala Rugby Club
Peter Fatialofa (c)	Prop	26 April 1959 (aged 32)	9	(New Zealand) Auckland R.F.U.
Palamia Lilomaiava	Prop	23 March 1960 (aged 31)	0	(Samoa) Marist St. Joseph
Vili Alaalatoa	Prop	9 August 1962 (aged 29)	4	(Australia) Manly RUFC
David Sio	Prop	21 June 1962 (aged 29)	1	(Australia) Northern Suburbs Rugby Club
Mark Birtwistle	Lock	17 October 1962 (aged 28)	0	(New Zealand) Wellington R.F.U.
Mat Keenan	Lock	26 October 1960 (aged 30)	0	(New Zealand) Auckland Rugby Union
Eddie Ioane	Lock	2 June 1966 (aged 25)	4	(New Zealand) Auckland Rugby Union
Junior Paramore	Flanker	18 November 1968 (aged 22)	2	(New Zealand) Counties Manukau R.F.U.
Danny Kaleopa	Flanker	3 May 1966 (aged 25)	3	(New Zealand) Canterbury R.F.U.
Apollo Perelini	Flanker	16 July 1969 (aged 22)	2	(New Zealand) Auckland R.F.U.
Sila Vaifale	Flanker	5 July 1967 (aged 24)	8	(Samoa) Marist St. Joseph
Pat Lam	Number 8	29 September 1968 (aged 23)	0	(New Zealand) Auckland R.F.U.
Mathew Vaea	Scrum-half	12 September 1966 (aged 25)	2	(Samoa) Marist St. Joseph
Tu Nu'uali'itia	Scrum-half	12 June 1971 (aged 20)	0	(New Zealand) Counties Manukau R.F.U.
Stephen Bachop	Fly-half	2 April 1966 (aged 25)	2	(New Zealand) Canterbury R.F.U.
Filipo Saena	Fly-half	6 June 1966 (aged 25)	13	(Samoa) Moata'a Rugby Club
To'o Vaega	Centre	17 August 1965 (aged 26)	12	(New Zealand) Auckland R.F.U.
Frank Bunce	Centre	4 February 1962 (aged 29)	0	(New Zealand) North Harbour R.F.U.
Tupo Fa'amasino	Centre	13 April 1966 (aged 25)	10	(New Zealand) Wellington R.F.U.
Timo Tagaloa	Wing	17 October 1964 (aged 26)	5	(New Zealand) Wellington R.F.U.
Brian Lima	Wing	25 January 1972 (aged 19)	2	(Samoa) Marist St. Joseph
Freddie Tuilagi	Wing	9 June 1971 (aged 20)	0	(Samoa) Marist St. Joseph
Andrew Aiolupo	Fullback	19 April 1970 (aged 21)	24	(Samoa) Moata'a Rugby Club

== Pool D ==
=== Canada ===
Head coach: (England) Ian Birtwell

Note: Flags indicate national union for the club/province as defined by World Rugby.

Player	Position	Date of birth (age)	Caps	Club/province
David Speirs	Hooker	15 September 1964 (aged 27)	3	(Canada) Meraloma Rugby
Karl Svoboda	Hooker	23 March 1962 (aged 29)	11	(Canada) Ajax Wanderers R.U.F.C.
Eddie Evans	Prop	15 September 1964 (aged 27)	12	(Canada) UBC Old Boys Ravens
Dan Jackart	Prop	4 May 1962 (aged 29)	3	(Canada) UBC Old Boys Ravens
Gary Dukelow	Prop	15 September 1956 (aged 35)	14	(Canada) James Bay A.A.
Paul Szabo	Prop	4 May 1962 (aged 29)	3	(Canada) Britannia Lions R.C.
Norm Hadley	Lock	2 December 1964 (aged 26)	6	(Canada) UBC Old Boys Ravens
John Robertsen	Lock	28 June 1958 (aged 33)	7	(Canada) UBC Old Boys Ravens
Ron van den Brink	Lock	30 September 1962 (aged 29)	5	(Canada) James Bay A.A.
Al Charron	Lock	28 June 1958 (aged 33)	7	(Canada) Ottawa Irish R.C.
Roy Radu	Flanker	11 September 1963 (aged 28)	12	(Canada) UBC Old Boys Ravens
Bruce Breen	Flanker	13 October 1961 (aged 29)	6	(Canada) Meraloma Rugby
Gord MacKinnon	Flanker	27 August 1958 (aged 33)	6	(Canada) Britannia Lions R.C.
Glen Ennis	Number 8	19 May 1964 (aged 27)	15	(Canada) Kats R.C.
John Graf	Scrum-half	3 December 1968 (aged 22)	4	(Canada) UBC Old Boys Ravens
Chris Tynan	Scrum-half	11 July 1966 (aged 25)	7	(Canada) Meraloma Rugby
Gareth Rees	Fly-half	30 June 1967 (aged 24)	13	(Canada) Castaway Wanderers RFC
Scott Stewart	Fly-half	16 January 1969 (aged 22)	3	(Canada) UBC Old Boys Ravens
Steve Gray	Centre	19 July 1963 (aged 28)	10	(Canada) Kats R.C.
Christian Stewart	Centre	17 October 1966 (aged 24)	2	(Canada) Meraloma Rugby
Tom Woods	Centre	29 October 1962 (aged 28)	3	(Canada) James Bay A.A.
John Lecky	Centre	15 February 1960 (aged 31)	16	(Canada) Meraloma Rugby
Dave Lougheed	Wing	11 April 1968 (aged 23)	3	(Canada) Toronto Welsh R.F.C.
Pat Palmer	Wing	6 November 1962 (aged 28)	13	(Canada) UBC Old Boys Ravens
Mark Wyatt (c)	Fullback	12 April 1961 (aged 30)	26	(Canada) Velox Valhallians

=== Fiji ===
Head coaches: (Fiji) Samisoni Viriviri and (New Zealand) George Simpkin

Note: Flags indicate national union for the club/province as defined by World Rugby.

Player	Position	Date of birth (age)	Caps	Club/province
Mosese Taga (c)	Hooker	17 September 1964 (aged 27)	16	(Fiji) QVS Old Boys/Suva
Dranivesi Baleiwai	Hooker	17 April 1964 (aged 27)	2	(Fiji) Duavata/Rewa
Salacieli Naivilawasa	Hooker	14 February 1961 (aged 30)	20	Fiji Police/Suva
Epeli Naituivau	Prop	22 May 1962 (aged 29)	6	Fiji Army/Suva
Peni Volavola	Prop	6 June 1963 (aged 28)	9	(Australia) Brothers/Queensland
Naibuka Vuli	Prop	6 June 1960 (aged 31)	0	(Fiji) Public Works Department /Lautoka
Sam Domoni	Lock	25 December 1968 (aged 22)	4	(Fiji) Waimanu/Rewa
Ilaitia Savai	Lock	12 July 1960 (aged 31)	24	(Fiji) Regent/Nadi
Aisake Nadolo	Lock	13 July 1964 (aged 27)	12	(Fiji) QVS Old Boys/Suva
Alifereti Dere	Flanker	29 September 1961 (aged 30)	9	Fiji Army/Suva
Laisenia Kato	Flanker	14 November 1966 (aged 24)	2	(Fiji) Saunaka/Nadi
Max Olsson	Flanker	19 July 1967 (aged 24)	6	(Fiji) St.John's Marist/Suva
Pita Naruma	Flanker	27 November 1959 (aged 31)	9	Fiji Police/Suva
Ifereimi Tawake	Number 8	21 September 1962 (aged 29)	8	(Fiji) Yalovata/Nadroga
Pauliasi Tabulutu	Scrum-half	15 July 1967 (aged 24)	14	(Fiji) Nabua/Suva
Mosese Vosanibola	Scrum-half	28 July 1962 (aged 29)	1	(Fiji) QVS Old Boys/Suva
Waisale Serevi	Fly-half	20 May 1968 (aged 23)	6	(Fiji) Nabua/Suva
Tomasi Rabaka	Fly-half	5 December 1965 (aged 25)	3	(Fiji) Mount St. Mary's/Nadi
Kalaveti Naisoro	Centre	14 February 1969 (aged 22)	3	(Fiji) FSC/Lautoka
Savenaca Aria	Centre	30 April 1964 (aged 27)	5	(Fiji) Regent/Nadi
Tomasi Lovo	Wing	5 November 1960 (aged 30)	4	(Fiji) QVS Old Boys/Suva
Noa Nadruku	Wing	19 September 1967 (aged 24)	11	(Fiji) Hyatt/Nadroga
Fili Seru	Wing	11 March 1970 (aged 21)	5	(Fiji) Nabua/Suva
Tevita Vonolagi	Wing	29 November 1963 (aged 27)	10	Fiji Army
Severo Koroduadua	Fullback	22 December 1960 (aged 30)	21	Fiji Police/Suva
Opeti Turuva	Fullback	8 July 1967 (aged 24)	2	(Fiji) Yavusania/Nadi

=== France ===
Head coach: (France) Daniel Dubroca

Note: Flags indicate national union for the club/province as defined by World Rugby.

Player	Position	Date of birth (age)	Caps	Club/province
Grégoire Lascubé	Hooker	3 April 1962 (aged 29)	6	(France) SU Agen
Philippe Marocco	Hooker	14 June 1960 (aged 31)	17	(France) AS Montferrand
Pascal Ondarts	Prop	1 April 1956 (aged 35)	38	(France) Biarritz Olympique
Philippe Gimbert	Prop	20 March 1966 (aged 25)	2	(France) CA Bordeaux-Bègles Gironde
Louis Armary	Prop	24 July 1963 (aged 28)	21	(France) FC Lourdes
Jean-Marie Cadieu	Lock	16 October 1963 (aged 27)	2	(France) Stade Toulousain
Olivier Roumat	Lock	10 June 1966 (aged 25)	19	(France) US Dax
Thierry Devergie	Flanker	27 July 1966 (aged 25)	15	(France) RC Nîmes
Éric Champ	Flanker	8 June 1962 (aged 29)	38	(France) RC Toulonnais
Laurent Cabannes	Flanker	6 February 1964 (aged 27)	7	Racing Club de France
Michel Courtiols	Flanker	27 April 1965 (aged 26)	3	(France) CA Bordeaux-Bègles Gironde
Abdelatif Benazzi	Flanker	20 August 1968 (aged 23)	8	(France) SU Agen
Marc Cécillon	Number 8	30 July 1959 (aged 32)	17	(France) CS Bourgoin-Jallieu
Fabien Galthié	Scrum-half	20 March 1969 (aged 22)	2	(France) US Colomiers
Henri Sanz	Scrum-half	17 June 1963 (aged 28)	11	(France) RC Narbonne
Didier Camberabero	Fly-half	9 January 1961 (aged 30)	30	(France) FC Grenoble
Thierry Lacroix	Fly-half	2 March 1967 (aged 24)	4	(France) US Dax
Philippe Sella	Centre	14 February 1962 (aged 29)	76	(France) SU Agen
Franck Mesnel	Centre	30 June 1961 (aged 30)	41	Racing Club de France
Philippe Saint-André	Wing	19 April 1967 (aged 24)	10	(France) ASM Montferrand
Jean-Baptiste Lafond	Wing	29 December 1961 (aged 29)	24	Racing Club de France
Patrice Lagisquet	Wing	4 September 1962 (aged 29)	45	(France) Aviron Bayonnais
Serge Blanco (c)	Fullback	31 August 1958 (aged 33)	89	(France) Biarritz Olympique
Jean-Luc Sadourny	Fullback	26 August 1966 (aged 25)	1	(France) US Colomiers

=== Romania ===
Head coach: (Romania) Peter Ianusevici

Note: Flags indicate national union for the club/province as defined by World Rugby.

Player	Position	Date of birth (age)	Caps	Club/province
Christian Gheorghe	Hooker	15 May 1971 (aged 20)	0	(Romania) RC Grivița București
Gheorghe Ion	Hooker	27 July 1960 (aged 31)	22	(Romania) CS Dinamo București
Gabriel Vlad	Prop	9 April 1969 (aged 22)	0	(Romania) RC Grivița București
Viorel Ionescu	Prop	30 November 1968 (aged 22)	0	(Romania) RCJ Farul Constanța
Constantin Stan	Prop	10 January 1969 (aged 22)	5	(Romania) SCM Gloria Buzău
Gheorghe Leonte	Prop	12 February 1963 (aged 28)	33	(France) CS Vienne Rugby
Gheorghe Corneliu	Prop	unknown	8	(Romania) RCJ Farul Constanța
Sandu Ciorăscu	Lock	11 September 1966 (aged 25)	20	(France) SC Angoulême
Constantin Cojocariu	Lock	27 June 1965 (aged 26)	10	(Romania) CS Dinamo București
Nicușor Marin	Lock	9 July 1967 (aged 24)	0	(Romania) RCJ Farul Constanța
Gheorghe Dinu	Flanker	16 November 1962 (aged 28)	8	(Romania) CSS Locomotiva București
Ioan Doja	Flanker	11 November 1966 (aged 24)	13	(Romania) CS Dinamo București
Andrei Gurănescu	Flanker	24 July 1967 (aged 24)	1	(Romania) CS Dinamo București
Haralambie Dumitraș (c)	Number 8	11 February 1960 (aged 31)	34	(France) Pau
Tiberiu Brînză	Number 8	21 September 1968 (aged 23)	2	(Romania) RC Grivița București
Mihai Foca	Scrum-half	1 October 1967 (aged 24)	0	(Romania) RCJ Farul Constanța
Daniel Neaga	Scrum-half	5 November 1965 (aged 25)	20	(Romania) CS Dinamo București
Ilie Ivanciuc	Fly-half	26 July 1971 (aged 20)	0	(Romania) CSM Bucovina Suceava
Neculai Nichitean	Fly-half	27 September 1969 (aged 22)	6	(Romania) CSM Știința Cemin
Nicolae Fulina	Centre	22 October 1965 (aged 25)	13	(Romania) RCJ Farul Constanța
Nicolae Răcean	Centre	29 November 1963 (aged 27)	15	(Romania) CS Universitatea Cluj-Napoca
Adrian Lungu	Centre	5 September 1960 (aged 31)	67	(Romania) CS Dinamo București
George Sava	Centre	4 August 1966 (aged 25)	9	(Romania) CSM Știința Cemin
Ștefan Tofan	Centre	25 February 1965 (aged 26)	17	(Romania) CS Dinamo București
Lucian Colceriu	Wing	8 September 1968 (aged 23)	1	(Romania) CSA Steaua București
Cătălin Sasu	Wing	24 January 1968 (aged 23)	5	(Romania) RCJ Farul Constanța
Marian Dumitru	Fullback	8 March 1969 (aged 22)	5	(Romania) CS Rapid București
