= Zanon =

Zanon or Zanón may refer to:

- FaSinPat, formerly known as Zanon, an Argentine worker-controlled ceramic tile factory

== People ==
- Antonio Zanon (1696–1770), Italian entrepreneur
- Damiano Zanon (born 1983), Italian footballer
- Fermín Zanón Cervera (1875–1944), Spanish zoologist
- Greg Zanon (born 1980), Canadian ice hockey player
- Jean-Louis Zanon (born 1961), French footballer
- Kiara Zanon (born 2002), American ice hockey player
- Lino Zanon, Italian biathlete and ski mountaineer
- Nicolò Zanon (born 1961), Italian judge and law professor

== See also ==
- Zanoni (disambiguation)
