= Mosese =

Mosese is a name. Notable people with the name include:

- Mosese Bogisa, Fijian cricketer
- Mosese Bulitavu, Fijian politician
- Mosese Dawai (born 1998), Fijian rugby union player
- Mosese Ducivaki (born 1991), Fijian rugby union player
- Mosese Foliaki (born 2000), Tongan athlete
- Mosese Fotuaika (1992–2013), New Zealand rugby league footballer
- Mosese Luveitasau (born 1980), Fijian rugby union footballer
- Mosese Moala (born 1978), Tongan rugby union player
- Mosese Pangai (born 1991), Tonga rugby league footballer
- Mosese Qionibaravi (1938–1987), Fijian chief
- Mosese Rauluni] (born 1975), Fijian rugby union footballer
- Mosese Suli (born 1998), Tonga rugby league player
- Mosese Taga (1964–2022), Fijian rugby union player
- Mosese Tikoitoga (died 2023), Fijian soldier
- Mosese Tuipulotu (born 2001), Australian rugby union player
- Mosese Vitolio Tui (born 1961), Samoan priest
- Mosese Voka (born 1985), Fijian rugby player
- Mosese Volavola (born 1979), Fijian rugby union footballer
- Mosese Vosanibola (born 1962), Fijian rugby union player
- Lemohang Jeremiah Mosese (born 1980), Mosotho screenwriter
- Salamina Mphelo Mosese (born 1983), South African actress
