= Zannoni =

Zannoni is a surname of Italian origin. Notable people with the surname include:

- Davide Zannoni (born 1958), Italian composer
- Giorgia Zannoni (born 1998), Italian volleyball player
- Giuseppe Zannoni (1849–1903), Italian painter
- Torindo Zannoni (1886–1922), Italian Farmer and Hero

== See also ==
- Zanoni (disambiguation)
