= The Varsity Match =

Annual rugby union fixture

The Varsity Match (rugby)
- Oxford Cambridge
- First meeting: 1872
- Latest meeting: 2023
- Stadiums: The Parks (1872); Parker's Piece (1873); The Oval; Richardson's Field; Rectory Field; Queen's Club (1887–1920).; Twickenham (1921–2023); StoneX Stadium (2024– )

Statistics
- Total meetings: 140
- All-time series: Cambridge leads, 65 to 62; 14 draws

The Varsity Match is an annual rugby union fixture played between the universities of Oxford and Cambridge in England. The event began in 1872 with the first men's match, with interruptions only for the two World Wars and the COVID-19 pandemic. From 1921 to 2023 the game was played at Twickenham Stadium, London and usually took place in early December. The game is now played in March and will take place at StoneX Stadium in 2024.

Following the 141st match in 2023, Oxford have 62 wins, and Cambridge maintain the lead with 65; 14 games have ended in draws. Varsity matches between Oxford and Cambridge are also arranged in various other sports.

The women's rugby Varsity Match was first played in 1988 and has taken place at Twickenham on the same day as the men's game since 2015. Cambridge won the 2019 match, repeating their 8–5 victory of 2018.

== History ==
The history of The Varsity Match extends back to early 1872. It was a year after the first ever rugby international (Scotland v England). Both Cambridge and Oxford sent officials to meet and arrange a match between each other. At The Parks, Oxford, they played a 20 a-side version of the game (as opposed to today's 15 a-side games; the teams would be set to 15 a-side in 1875). Oxford won the inaugural meeting. In that first match, Oxford wore dark blue jerseys (the same as today, though at some stages they wore white), however, Cambridge played in pink, changing to their blue and white in 1876.

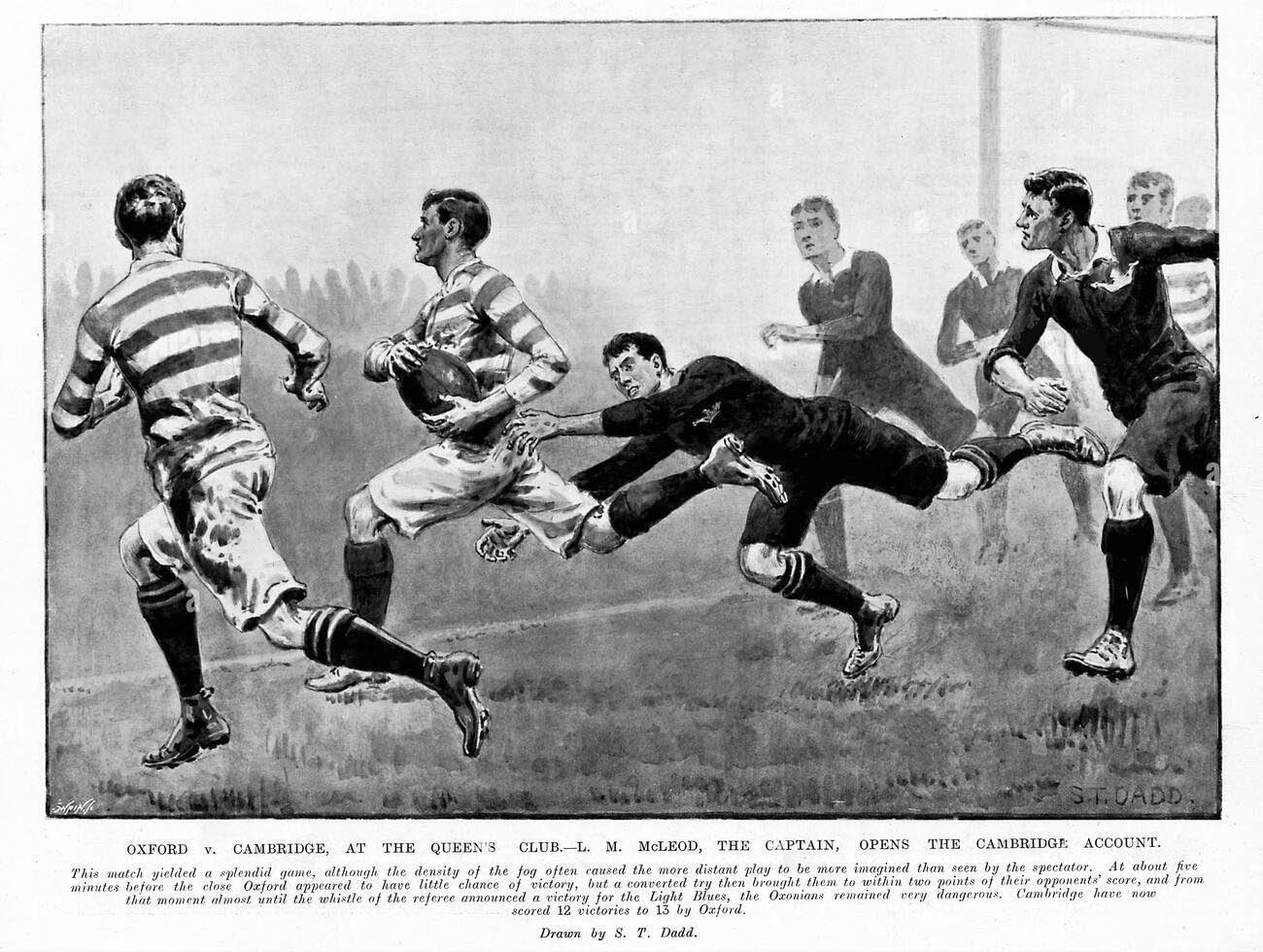
LM Macleod scoring for Cambridge at the 1904 Varsity Match. Cambridge won 15-13

The second Varsity Match in 1873 was played at Parker's Piece in Cambridge, but since then it has always been played in London. The Oval in Kennington staged seven matches, three games were played at Richardson's Field in Blackheath and another Blackheath venue, Rectory Field, hosted four games before Queen's Club in Kensington became the regular venue from 1887 to 1920. The 1878 and 1879 matches were postponed due to fog.

In 1919, the players were apparently invisible due to fog. In 1921 the match was moved to the Rugby Football Union's famous home ground, Twickenham. The official Varsity Match was not played during wartime although a series of matches were played during the Second World War, resulting in nine wins for Cambridge, two wins for Oxford and one draw. All these games were played either at Oxford or Cambridge. The hundredth match in 1981 was played at Twickenham with a three to four-inch layer of snow covering the pitch; it had snowed overnight and the snow could not be removed in time for the game.

In 2013 Oxford's Sam Egerton was sent off for an off-the-ball incident and became the first player to be dismissed in the history of the match. Oxford's 43–6 win in 2014 was the biggest victory in the history of the fixture and gave them a fifth successive victory for the first time ever. Cambridge have recorded five wins in a row on three separate occasions, 1972–76, 1980–84 and 1994–98. Oxford's win in the 2015 match was their sixth successive win in the fixture, a record for either side.

In 2021, the event was rebranded as The Varsity Matches in order to reflect the continued integration of the women's fixture.

Due to the COVID-19 pandemic, the 139th match was postponed to March 2021. It was then further postponed to 4 July 2021 and relocated to Welford Road Stadium, Leicester. The 140th match was played at Twickenham in April 2022. The 2024 matches were played at StoneX Stadium.

== Referees ==
There was not a referee until the 1881 match, when Mr H. H. Taylor officiated. Prior to this each game had two umpires, one from each university. The record number of appearances is held by former RFU secretary Rowland Hill along with Welshman Gwynne Walters both with seven games. Other notable International referees who have controlled this fixture are Englishmen G. H. Harnett (6) Cyril Gadney (6) and H.L. Ashmore (5), along with Welshmen Albert Freethy (6) and Clive Norling (5). Up until the start of the professional era, one of the unique aspects of the Varsity game was that the referee was not appointed by the RFU but agreed upon and invited by the two captains. This tradition ended after the 1997–98 season, along with that of the previous year's captains returning to act as touch judges (a continuation of the original custom of each university appointing an umpire), when the RFU Referees' committee decided that touch judges could only be qualified officials and that the RFU should appoint the referee. Now there is also a television match official.

== Sponsors ==
In 2001 the MMC Trophy replaced the Bowring Bowl, established in 1976, as the prize. 2005 was the last year Marsh & McLennan Companies (MMC) sponsored the match. Subsequent sponsors have been Lehman Brothers from 2006 to 2007, Nomura Group from 2008 to 2011 and Pol Roger and Glenfarclas distillery since 2012. The clothing manufacturer Jack Wills sponsored the clothing until 2014 Investment bank Jefferies Group were announced as the title sponsor for The Varsity Matches 2022.

== Notable participants ==
Many of those who have played in the Varsity Match have gone on to win international honours; a number of others played in the Match after earning international honours. These include:

- (England) Paul Ackford (lock, Cambridge)
- (England) Charlie Amesbury (full-back, Cambridge)
- (England) Simon Amor (scrum-half, Cambridge)
- (England) Rob Andrew (fly-half, Cambridge)
- (England) Stuart Barnes (fly-half, Oxford)
- (England) Phil de Glanville (centre, Oxford)
- (England) Huw Davies (fly-half, Cambridge)
- (England) Mark Denney (centre, Cambridge)
- (England) Simon Halliday (centre, Oxford)
- (England) Alastair Hignell (full-back, Cambridge)
- (England) Damian Hopley (centre, Cambridge)
- (England) Martin Purdy (lock, Cambridge)
- (England) Ben Ransom (full-back, Oxford)
- (England) Marcus Rose (full-back, Cambridge)
- (England) Chris Sheasby (number 8, Cambridge)
- (England) Oliver Tomaszczyk (prop, Oxford)
- (England) Victor Ubogu (prop, Oxford)
- (England) Tony Underwood (wing, Cambridge)
- (England) Dom Waldouck (centre, Oxford)
- (England) Ben Woods (flanker, Cambridge)
- (Ireland) David Humphreys (fly-half, Oxford)
- (Ireland) Tyrone Howe (wing, Oxford)
- (Ireland) Mike Gibson (centre, Cambridge)
- (Ireland) Brendan Mullin (centre, Oxford)
- (Ireland) David Quinlan (centre, Cambridge)
- (Scotland) Joe Ansbro (centre, Cambridge)
- (Scotland) Simon Danielli (wing, Oxford)
- (Scotland) Gavin Hastings (full-back, Cambridge)
- (Scotland) Simon Holmes (openside flanker, Cambridge)
- (Scotland) Stuart Moffat (full-back, Cambridge)
- (Scotland) Rob Wainwright (flanker, Cambridge)
- (Wales) Gerald Davies (wing, Cambridge)
- (Wales) Onllwyn Brace (fly-half, Oxford)
- (Wales) Eddie Butler (number 8, Cambridge)
- (Wales) Gareth Davies (fly-half, Oxford)
- (Wales) Jamie Roberts (centre, Cambridge)
- (Italy) Marco Rivaro (centre, Cambridge)
- (Japan) Kensuke Iwabuchi (Cambridge)
- (Japan) Toshiyuki Hayashi (Oxford)
- (Australia) Thomas Baxter (fly-half/flanker, Oxford)
- (Australia) Roger Davis (Oxford)
- (Australia) James Horwill (lock, Cambridge)
- (Australia) Tom Lawton Snr (fly-half, Oxford)
- (Australia) Brendon Nasser (number 8, Oxford)
- (Australia) Bill Ross (hooker, Oxford)
- (Australia) Ainslie Sheil (Oxford)
- (Australia) Brian Smith (fly-half, Oxford)
- (Australia) Troy Coker (number 8, Oxford)
- (Australia) Bob Egerton (wing, Oxford)
- (Australia) Joe Roff (wing, Oxford)
- (Australia) Dan Vickerman (lock, Cambridge)
- (Australia) Ian Williams (wing, Oxford)
- (Australia) David Dix (lock, Cambridge)
- (New Zealand) Chris Laidlaw (scrum-half, Oxford)
- (New Zealand) David Kirk (scrum-half, Oxford)
- (New Zealand) Mark Ranby (centre, Cambridge)
- (New Zealand) Anton Oliver (hooker, Oxford)
- (New Zealand) Mark Robinson (centre, Cambridge)
- (South Africa) Tommy Bedford (Oxford)
- (South Africa) Nick Mallett (Oxford)
- (South Africa) Nick Koster (flanker, Cambridge)
- (South Africa) Flip van der Merwe (lock, Cambridge)
- (South Africa) Anton van Zyl (lock, Oxford)
- (Canada) Matthew Guinness-King (centre, Cambridge)
- (Canada) Gareth Rees (fly-half, Oxford)
- (Canada) Kevin Tkachuk (prop, Oxford)
- (Canada) Andrew Bibby (wing, Oxford)
- (Canada) Stan McKeen (flanker, Oxford)
- (United States) Nate Brakeley (lock, Cambridge)
- (United States) Raymond Burse (wing, Oxford)
- (United States) Gary Hein (wing, Oxford)
- (United States) Don James (prop, Oxford)
- (United States) Will Johnson (prop, Oxford)
- (United States) Ray Lehner (prop, Oxford)
- (United States) Doug Rowe (scrum-half, Cambridge)
- (United States) Adam Russell (lock, Oxford)
- (United States) Kurt Shuman (full-back, Oxford)

1987 Rugby World Cup winning All Blacks captain David Kirk played in the 1987 and 1988 Varsity Matches after ending his international career to take up a Rhodes Scholarship at Oxford. Brian Smith represented Australia in the 1987 Rugby World Cup and played in the 1988 and captained 1989 Varsity match for Oxford, before continuing his international career with Ireland 1990–1991.

Former Wallaby Joe Roff played in the 2006 and 2007 Varsity Matches for Oxford after retiring from professional rugby, captaining the side in 2007. Five former or current internationals played in the 2008 Varsity Match. The most notable were retired All Black hooker Anton Oliver for Oxford and former Wallaby lock Dan Vickerman for Cambridge, with Oxford also fielding current Canada flanker Stan McKeen and Cambridge fielding former All Black centre Mark Ranby and former United States scrum-half Doug Rowe. Vickerman captained Cambridge in the 2009 Match, in which McKeen and Rowe also played.

For the 2015 match, Wales and British & Irish Lions centre Jamie Roberts played for Cambridge University as he studied for his master's degree in medical science at the university.

== Winners ==
Results and information available on Varsity Match website

=== Men's ===
- 1872: Oxford
- 1873: Cambridge
- 1873: Draw
- 1874: Draw
- 1875: Oxford
- 1876: Cambridge
- 1877: Oxford
- 1879: Draw
- 1880: Cambridge
- 1880: Draw
- 1881: Oxford
- 1882: Oxford
- 1883: Oxford
- 1884: Oxford
- 1885: Cambridge
- 1886: Cambridge
- 1887: Cambridge
- 1888: Cambridge
- 1889: Oxford
- 1890: Draw
- 1891: Cambridge
- 1892: Draw
- 1893: Oxford
- 1894: Draw
- 1895: Cambridge
- 1896: Oxford
- 1897: Oxford
- 1898: Cambridge
- 1899: Cambridge
- 1900: Oxford
- 1901: Oxford
- 1902: Draw
- 1903: Oxford
- 1904: Cambridge
- 1905: Cambridge
- 1906: Oxford
- 1907: Oxford
- 1908: Draw
- 1909: Oxford
- 1910: Oxford
- 1911: Oxford
- 1912: Cambridge
- 1913: Cambridge
- 1914-1918 Not held due to WWI
- 1919: Cambridge
- 1920: Oxford
- 1921: Oxford
- 1922: Cambridge
- 1923: Oxford
- 1924: Oxford
- 1925: Cambridge
- 1926: Cambridge
- 1927: Cambridge
- 1928: Cambridge
- 1929: Oxford
- 1930: Draw
- 1931: Oxford
- 1932: Oxford
- 1933: Oxford
- 1934: Cambridge
- 1935: Draw
- 1936: Cambridge
- 1937: Oxford
- 1938: Cambridge
- 1939-1944 Not held due to WWII
- 1945: Cambridge
- 1946: Oxford
- 1947: Cambridge
- 1948: Oxford
- 1949: Oxford
- 1950: Oxford
- 1951: Oxford
- 1952: Cambridge
- 1953: Draw
- 1954: Cambridge
- 1955: Oxford
- 1956: Cambridge
- 1957: Oxford
- 1958: Cambridge
- 1959: Oxford
- 1960: Cambridge
- 1961: Cambridge
- 1962: Cambridge
- 1963: Cambridge
- 1964: Oxford
- 1965: Draw
- 1966: Oxford
- 1967: Cambridge
- 1968: Cambridge
- 1969: Oxford
- 1970: Oxford
- 1971: Oxford
- 1972: Cambridge
- 1973: Cambridge
- 1974: Cambridge
- 1975: Cambridge
- 1976: Cambridge
- 1977: Oxford
- 1978: Cambridge
- 1979: Oxford
- 1980: Cambridge
- 1981: Cambridge
- 1982: Cambridge
- 1983: Cambridge
- 1984: Cambridge
- 1985: Oxford
- 1986: Oxford
- 1987: Cambridge
- 1988: Oxford
- 1989: Cambridge
- 1990: Oxford
- 1991: Cambridge
- 1992: Cambridge
- 1993: Oxford
- 1994: Cambridge
- 1995: Cambridge
- 1996: Cambridge
- 1997: Cambridge
- 1998: Cambridge
- 1999: Oxford
- 2000: Oxford
- 2001: Oxford
- 2002: Cambridge
- 2003: Draw
- 2004: Oxford
- 2005: Cambridge
- 2006: Cambridge
- 2007: Cambridge
- 2008: Oxford
- 2009: Cambridge
- 2010: Oxford
- 2011: Oxford
- 2012: Oxford
- 2013: Oxford
- 2014: Oxford
- 2015: Oxford
- 2016: Cambridge
- 2017: Cambridge
- 2018: Oxford
- 2019: Cambridge
- 2020 Not held due to the COVID-19 pandemic
- 2021: Oxford
- 2022: Oxford
- 2023: Cambridge
- 2024: Cambridge
- 2025: Cambridge
- 2026: Oxford

==== By total wins ====
| Total matches | Cambridge victories | Oxford victories | Draws |
|---|---|---|---|
| 144 | 67 | 63 | 14 |

=== Women's ===
- 1988: Cambridge
- 1989: Oxford
- 1990: Oxford
- 1991: Oxford
- 1992: Oxford
- 1993: Oxford
- 1994: Oxford
- 1995: Oxford
- 1996: Oxford
- 1997: Oxford
- 1998: Oxford
- 1999: Oxford
- 2000: Oxford
- 2001: Oxford
- 2002: Cambridge
- 2003: Cambridge
- 2004: Oxford
- 2005: Cambridge
- 2006: Oxford
- 2007: Oxford
- 2008: Cambridge
- 2009: Cambridge
- 2010: Cambridge
- 2011: Cambridge
- 2012: Oxford
- 2013: Oxford
- 2014: Oxford
- 2015 (March): Cambridge
- 2015 (December): Cambridge
- 2016: Oxford
- 2017: Cambridge
- 2018: Cambridge
- 2019: Cambridge
- 2020 Not held due to the COVID-19 pandemic
- 2021: Cambridge
- 2022: Draw
- 2023: Oxford
- 2024: Cambridge
- 2025: Oxford
- 2026: Oxford

==== By total wins ====
| Total matches | Cambridge victories | Oxford victories | Draws |
|---|---|---|---|
| 39 | 14 | 24 | 1 |

== See also ==
- Cambridge University RUFC
- Derby Day, a yearly rugby match between the longstanding rivals University of East Anglia and University of Essex
- List of British and Irish varsity matches
- Oxbridge rivalry
- Oxford University RFC
- Rugby union in England
- The Game (Harvard-Yale)
- The Scottish Varsity
- Welsh Varsity
