= Andrew Booth =

Andrew Booth may refer to:

- Andy Booth (born 1973), English retired footballer
- Andy Booth (racing driver) (born 1974), New Zealand racing driver
- Andy Booth (rugby union) (born 1967), Welsh rugby union player
- Andrew Donald Booth (1918–2009), British physicist and computer engineer
- Andrew Booth (soccer) (born 1997), American-Jamaican soccer player
- Andrew Booth Jr. (born 2000), American football player
- Andy Booth, guitarist with The Cassandra Complex
- Andrew Booth (character), a character in the television series Monarch of the Glen
