= Benn Robinson =

Australia international rugby union player

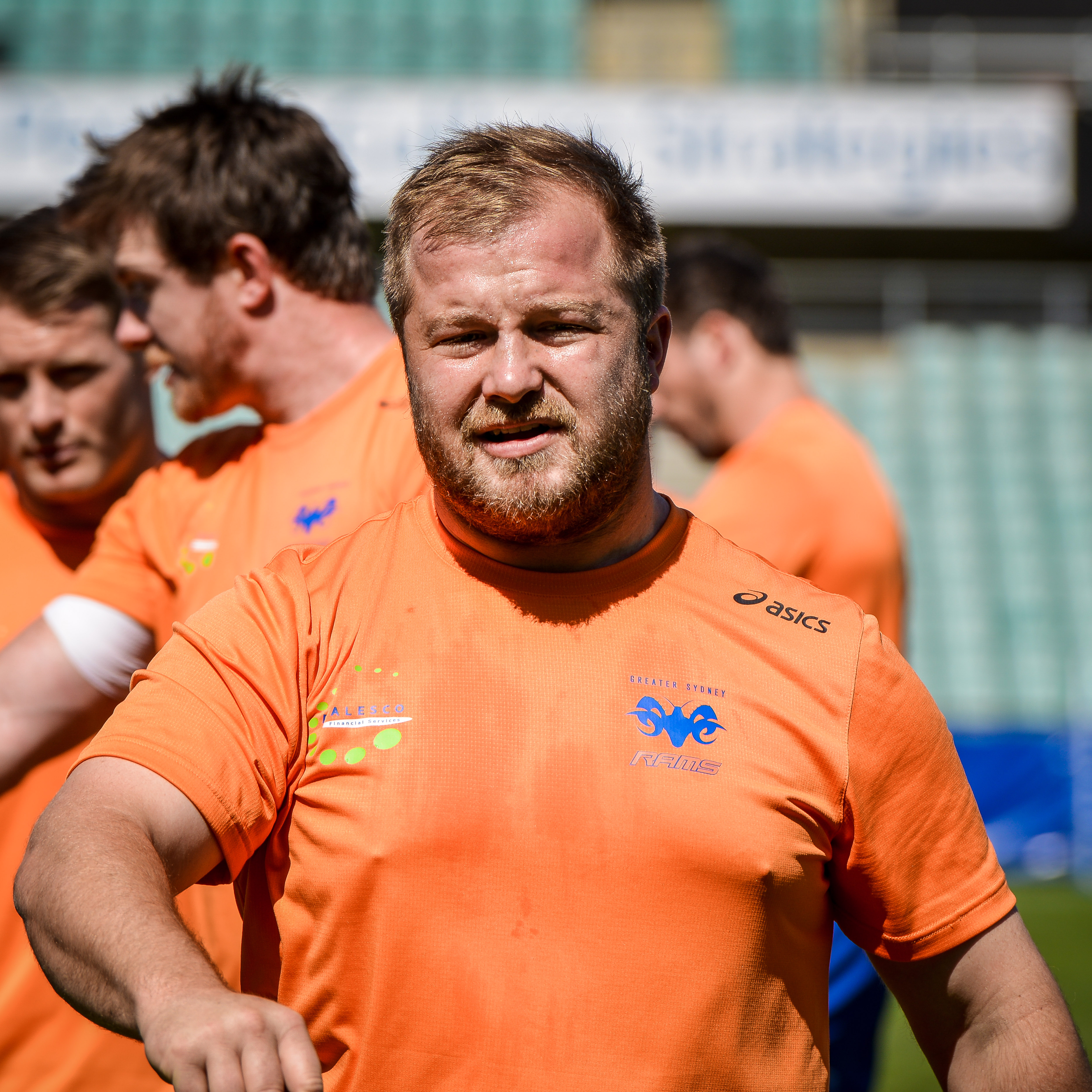
- Robinson in 2014
- Born: Benn Alexander Robinson; 19 July 1984 (age 42) Sydney, New South Wales, Australia
- Height: 183 cm (6 ft 0 in)
- Weight: 113 kg (17 st 11 lb)
- School: The King's School, Sydney

Rugby union career
- Position: Prop
Youth career
- Beecroft Rugby Club
Amateur team(s)
Years	Team	Apps	(Points)
2004–2014	Eastwood	54	(0)
Senior career
Years	Team	Apps	(Points)
2007	Western Sydney Rams	1	(0)
2014−2015	Greater Sydney Rams	5	(0)
- Correct as of 4 December 2014
Super Rugby
Years	Team	Apps	(Points)
2006–2016	Waratahs	151	(35)
- Correct as of 28 June 2015
International career
Years	Team	Apps	(Points)
2002	Australia Schoolboys	2	(0)
2003	Australia U19		
2005	Australia U21	5	(0)
2006–2015	Australia	72	(15)
- Correct as of 30 November 2014

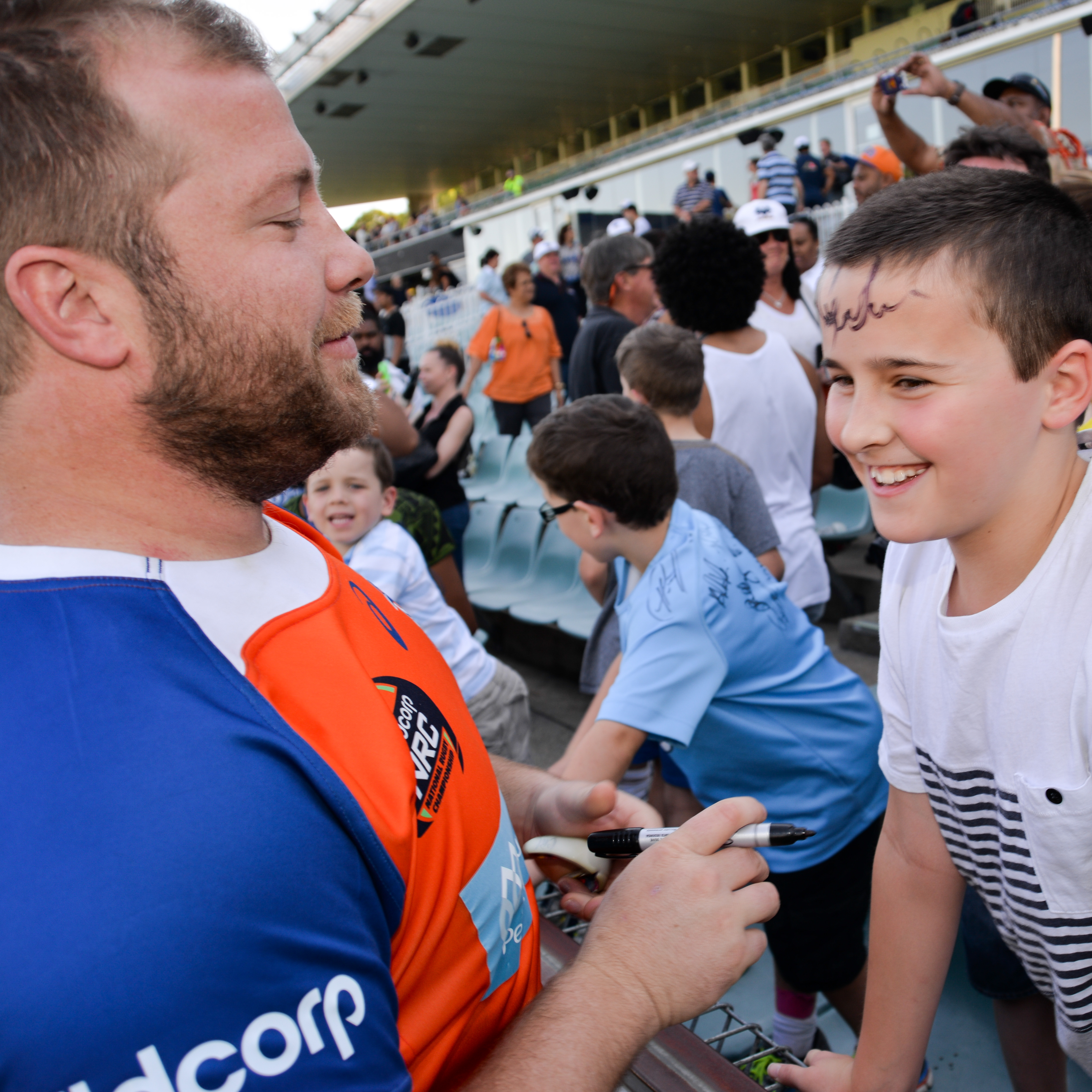
Robinson at fan signing

Benn Robinson (born 19 July 1984) is a former Australian professional rugby union footballer. He played as a loosehead prop for the New South Wales Waratahs in the Super Rugby and for Australia in international matches.

He retired from rugby in June 2016 after suffering a serious eye injury, having made 72 test match and 151 Super Rugby appearances.

== Early life ==
Robinson grew up in the town of Glenorie, on the outskirts of Sydney. He attended Glenorie Public School and played his junior rugby for the local Dural Rugby Club and Beecroft Cherrybrook Rugby Club. He was educated at The King's School, where he played for the First XV and went on to play for the Australian Schoolboys in 2002. He was selected and played for the Australian under 21 side in 2005, and played every match for the team at the IRB under-21 World Championships in Argentina.

== Rugby career ==
The 2006 season became a ground-breaking one for Robinson. He made his Super 14 debut for the Waratahs against the Queensland Reds in Brisbane on 11 February 2006, and went on to play in all 13 games for the Waratahs during the season. He also made his Test debut for the Wallabies against South Africa in the TriNations. In 2009 he became the second winner of the People's Choice – Wallaby of the Year award, at the John Eales Medal awards night. This award is voted on by the Australian public.

In 2011, Robinson's Rugby World Cup aspirations were dealt a cruel blow when he was ruled of the tournament with a season-ending knee injury. The blow was cruel luck for the popular 27-year-old, who had provided the Wallabies scrum with stability through much of the three seasons leading up to last year's Rugby World Cup. In 2012, Robinson became the 163rd player to captain New South Wales, leading the Waratahs side out for clashes with the Sharks and Chiefs.

In 2014, Robinson won the Super Rugby title with the Waratahs.

== Work in the media ==
Robinson has been utilised in various television media roles at different stages to date during his career. He was bestowed the nickname "Cat", due to his likeness to the former Australian Test cricketer and Channel Nine's The Footy Show personality, Greg "Fat Cat" Ritchie. While sidelined with injury in 2011, Robinson acted as an expert comments man for terrestrial broadcaster Channel Nine, during the key matches of the 2011 & 2015 Rugby World Cups. Benn has now commenced an Insurance career at a specialist sports Insurer SLE Worldwide Australia Pty Limited. Benn has commenced as an Underwriter to the stars.
