= 2004 Pacific Islanders rugby union tour of Australia and New Zealand =

Summary
P	W	D	L
Total
5	2	0	3
Test match
3	0	0	3
Opponent
P	W	D	L
Australia
1	0	0	1
New Zealand
1	0	0	1
South Africa
1	0	0	1

The 2004 Pacific Islander rugby union tour was a series of matches played by the Pacific Islanders in Australia and New Zealand during June and July 2004. The composite team was selected from the best players from Fiji, Samoa and Tonga, as well as Niue and the Cook Islands.

The Pacific Islanders won the first two tour matches against Queensland and New South Wales, but lost the three Test matches played against Australia, New Zealand, and South Africa.

== Touring party ==
The touring party was constituted as follows:

- Manager: Koli Rakore
- Manager Ops & Media: Philipp Muller
- Coach: John Boe
- Assistant coaches: Michael Jones, Viliami Ofahengaue, John Schuster
- Hon. Doctor: Dr. Fakaosi Pifeleti
- Physiotherapists: Jordan Salesa, Karen Sutton
- Trainer: Dominic Fonoti
- Captain: Inoke Afeaki
- Vice-captain: Mosese Rauluni
- Playing squad:

Note: Flags indicate national union under World Rugby eligibility rules. Players may hold more than one non-World Rugby nationality.

Player	Position	Union
Soane Tongaʻuiha	Prop	Tonga
Taufaʻao Filise	Prop	Tonga
Aleki Lutui	Hooker	Tonga
Joeli Lotawa	Hooker	Fiji
Mosese Moala	Prop	Tonga
Tevita Taumoepeau	Prop	Tonga
Inoke Afeaki (c)	Lock	Tonga
Filipo Levi	Lock	Samoa
Ifereimi Rawaqa	Lock	Fiji
Leo Lafaiali'i	Lock	Samoa
Semo Sititi	Flanker	Samoa
Alifereti Doviverata	Flanker	Fiji
Sisa Koyamaibole	Flanker	Fiji
Tu Tamarua	Flanker	Cook Islands
Sione Lauaki	Number 8	Tonga
Benhur Kivalu	Number 8	Tonga

Player	Position	Union
Mosese Rauluni	Scrum-half	Fiji
Steven So'oialo	Scrum-half	Samoa
Tanner Vili	Fly-half	Samoa
Tasesa Lavea	Fly-half	Samoa
Seremaia Bai	Fly-half	Fiji
Brian Lima	Wing	Samoa
Tane Tuʻipulotu	Centre	Tonga
Seilala Mapusua	Centre	Samoa
Seru Rabeni	Centre	Fiji
Sereli Bobo	Wing	Fiji
Lome Fa'atau	Wing	Samoa
Sitiveni Sivivatu	Wing	Fiji
Aisea Tuilevu	Fullback	Fiji
Norman Ligairi	Fullback	Fiji

== Matches ==
=== Queensland ===
20 June 2004

Queensland XV	29–48	Pacific Islanders
Try: Pelesasa (2), Hynes; Kefu; Con: Milroy (3); Pen: Milroy		Try: Sivivatu (3); Bai; Bobo; Fa'atau; Norman Ligairi; Filise; Con: Bai (4)

Ballymore Stadium, Brisbane
Attendance: 3,000
Referee: George Ayoub (Australia)

=== New South Wales ===
25 June 2004

Waratahs (New South Wales)	21–68	Pacific Islanders
Try: Turinui; McGann; Thaiday; Con: Burke (3)		Try: Sivivatu (2); Filise (2); Mapusua (2); Bai; Koyamaibole; Tongaʻuiha; Fa'atau; Con: Bai (9)

Sydney Football Stadium, Sydney
Attendance: 8,005
Referee: Greg Hinton (Australia)

=== Australia ===
3 July 2004

Australia	29–14	Pacific Islanders
Try: Mortlock (2); Giteau (2); Cannon; Con: Roff; Burke		Try: Lauaki; Bobo; Con: Bai (2)

Adelaide Oval, Adelaide
Attendance: 19,266
Referee: André Watson (South Africa)

Team details
Australia: 15. Joe Roff, 14. Clyde Rathbone, 13. Stirling Mortlock, 12. Matt Giteau, 11. Lote Tuqiri, 10. Stephen Larkham, 9. George Gregan (c), 8. David Lyons, 7. Phil Waugh, 6. Radike Samo, 5. Nathan Sharpe, 4. Justin Harrison, 3. Al Baxter, 2. Brendan Cannon, 1. Bill Young – Replacements: 16. Jeremy Paul, 17. Nic Henderson, 18. Dan Vickerman (yellow card) , 19. George Smith, 20. Chris Whitaker, 21. Matt Burke, 22. Chris Latham

Pacific Islanders: 15. Norman Ligairi, 14. Lome Fa'atau, 13. Seilala Mapusua, 12. Seremaia Bai, 11. Sitiveni Sivivatu, 10. Tanner Vili, 9. Moses Rauluni, 8. Alifereti Doviverata, 7. Sisa Koyamaibole, 6. Sione Lauaki, 5. Ifereimi Rawaqa, 4. Inoke Afeaki (c), 3. Taufaʻao Filise, 2. 'Aleki Lutui, 1. Soane Tongaʻuiha – Replacements: 17. Tevita Taumoepeau, 18. Leo Lafaiali'i, 19. Semo Sititi, 20. Steven So'oialo, 21. Seru Rabeni, 22. Sireli Bobo – Unused: 16. Joeli Lotawa

=== New Zealand ===
10 July 2004

New Zealand	41–26	Pacific Islanders
Try: Rokocoko (2); Marshall; Gear; Meeuws; Umaga; Con: Carter (4); Pen: Carter		Try: Sivivatu (2); Rabeni; Lauaki; Con: Bai (3)

North Harbour Stadium, Albany
Attendance: 22,000
Referee: Stuart Dickinson (Australia)

Team details
New Zealand: 15. Mils Muliaina, 14. Rico Gear, 13. Tana Umaga, 12. Dan Carter, 11. Joe Rokocoko, 10. Carlos Spencer, 9. Justin Marshall, 8. Xavier Rush, 7. Marty Holah, 6. Jono Gibbes, 5. Keith Robinson, 4. Chris Jack, 3. Carl Hayman, 2. Keven Mealamu, 1. Kees Meeuws – Replacements: 18. Jerry Collins, 20. Byron Kelleher, 21. Nick Evans – Unused: 16. Andrew Hore, 17. Greg Somerville, 19. Mose Tuiali'i, 22. Sam Tuitupou

Pacific Islanders: 15. Seru Rabeni, 14. Lome Fa'atau, 13. Brian Lima, 12. Seremaia Bai, 11. Sitiveni Sivivatu, 10. Tanner Vili, 9. Moses Rauluni, 8. Sisa Koyamaibole, 7. Alifereti Doviverata, 6. Sione Lauaki, 5. Ifereimi Rawaqa, 4. Inoke Afeaki (c), 3. Taufaʻao Filise, 2. 'Aleki Lutui, 1. Soane Tongaʻuiha – Replacements: 17. Tevita Taumoepeau, 18. Filipo Levi, 19. Semo Sititi, 19. Semo Sititi, 21. Tane Tuʻipulotu, 22. Sireli Bobo – Unused: 16. Joeli Lotawa, 20. Steven So'oialo

=== South Africa ===
17 July 2004

South Africa	38–24	Pacific Islanders
Try: Paulse (2); Cronjé; De Villiers; Con: Montgomery (3); Pen: Montgomery (4)		Try: Sivivatu (2); Lauaki; Bobo; Con: Seru Rabeni (2)

Express Advocate Stadium, Gosford, Australia
Attendance: 15,732
Referee: Scott Young (Australia)

Team details
South Africa: 15. Percy Montgomery, 14. Breyton Paulse, 13. Marius Joubert, 12. De Wet Barry, 11. Jean de Villiers, 10. Jaco van der Westhuyzen, 9. Bolla Conradie, 8. Jacques Cronjé, 7. AJ Venter, 6. Schalk Burger, 5. Gerrie Britz, 4. Bakkies Botha, 3. Eddie Andrews, 2. John Smit (c), 1. Os du Randt – Replacements: 17. CJ van der Linde, 18. Quinton Davids, 19. Pedrie Wannenburg, 20. Fourie du Preez – Unused: 16. Danie Coetzee, 21. Brent Russell, 22. Gaffie du Toit

Pacific Islanders: 15. Norman Ligairi, 14. Sireli Bobo, 13. Seilala Mapusua, 12. Seru Rabeni, 11. Sitiveni Sivivatu, 10. Tanner Vili, 9. Moses Rauluni, 8. Sisa Koyamaibole, 7. Alifereti Doviverata, 6. Sione Lauaki, 5. Ifereimi Rawaqa, 4. Inoke Afeaki (c), 3. Tevita Taumoepeau, 2. 'Aleki Lutui, 1. Soane Tongaʻuiha – Replacements: 16. Joeli Lotawa, 17. Taufaʻao Filise, 18. Filipo Levi, 19. Tu Tamarua, 20. Steven So'oialo, 21. Seremaia Bai, 22. Brian Lima

== See also ==
- 2004 mid-year rugby union tests
