= Lopeti =

Lopeti is a given name and surname. Notable people with the name include:

- Lopeti Faifua (born 2002), Australian rugby union player
- Lopeti Oto (born 1971), Tongan-Japanese rugby union player
- Lopeti Timani (born 1990), Tongan rugby union player
- Tavite Lopeti (born 1998), American rugby union player
