= Stan McKeen =

Canada international rugby union player

- Born: Stan S. McKeen; April 9, 1982 (age 44) Vancouver, British Columbia, Canada
- Height: 193 cm (6 ft 4 in)
- Weight: 104 kg (229 lb)
- University: Oxford University

Rugby union career
- Position: Flanker / No.8
Amateur team(s)
Years	Team	Apps	(Points)
- UBC Old Boys Ravens
Senior career
Years	Team	Apps	(Points)
- Cornish Pirates
–	Oxford University RFC		
International career
Years	Team	Apps	(Points)
2004–2007	Canada	20	(0)

Stan McKeen (born April 9, 1982, in Vancouver, British Columbia) is a Canadian rugby union player.

== Rugby career ==
McKeen began his rugby career at St. George's School in Vancouver and eventually found himself playing for the UBC Old Boys rugby club. While still a youngster Stan achieved provincial representative honours and in 2001 played for his country in the U-19s World Cup tournament. McKeen has also played for the Pacific Pride, Canada's under-23 elite rugby academy, and featured in the side's successful tour of eastern Canada in 2006.

After winning his first cap in 2004 versus the United States, McKeen became a regular in the Canadian national team for a number of seasons. He also excelled in the backrow for his professional club, the Cornish Pirates. McKeen joined the Pirates in 2007 and struggled with injury prior to leaving in 2008, when he took up a law degree at Oxford University. Towards the end of his playing career McKeen played for Oxford University rugby team. He featured in the 2008 Varsity Match, packing down alongside former All Black Anton Oliver. McKeen wore the number 6 jersey for Oxford University in their 33–29 victory over Cambridge. Cambridge had won the previous three Oxbridge encounters.
