= Laisenia Kato =

Fijian rugby union player (1966–2019)

- Born: Laisenia Katonawale; 14 November 1963 Saunaka, Nadi, Fiji
- Died: 14 January 2019 (aged 55) Sydney, Australia
- Height: 5 ft 11 in (180 cm)
- Weight: 187 lb (85 kg)

Rugby union career
- Position: Flanker
Amateur team(s)
Years	Team	Apps	(Points)
1997	Beecroft Rugby Club		
Senior career
Years	Team	Apps	(Points)
19??-1997	Suva		
International career
Years	Team	Apps	(Points)
1991	Fiji	4	(0)

Laisenia Katonawale known also as Laisenia Kato (Saunaka, Nadi, 14 November 1966 – 13 January 2019) was a Fijian former rugby union footballer, he played as flanker.

== Career ==
He played for the Saunaka village team, with which he won several tournaments in the country, and for the Nadi district team, with which he won the Farebrother-Sullivan Trophy in 1991. He played as blindside and openside flanker. In 1987 he was the first player from the Saunaka village to play for World XV.

He debuted in a test match against Tonga, in Suva, on 8 June 1991. Kato also played in the 1991 Rugby World Cup for the Fiji national team, playing all the three pool stage matches in the tournament. He retired from the international career after the 1991 Rugby World Cup, Later he played for the Suva District team and for Beecroft club from Sydney in 1997, winning the Paul Wharton Trophy as one of the best players of the team. After terminating his career, he worked for the Australian branch of Foxconn.

Kato died on 13 January 2019, he is survived by his wife and his three children, of which, Peceli, who became a rugby player for the Nadi district team.
