= Nataniela Oto =

Japan international rugby union player

- Born: May 16, 1980 (age 46) Tonga
- Height: 5 ft 8 in (1.73 m)
- Weight: 209 lb (95 kg)
- Notable relative(s): Lopeti Oto (older brother), Teruyoshi Joshua Oto (nephew)

Rugby union career
- Position(s): Wing; Flanker
Senior career
Years	Team	Apps	(Points)
- Toshiba Brave Lupus
International career
Years	Team	Apps	(Points)
2001–2007	Japan	12	(20)

Nataniela Oto (born May 16, 1980) is a Tongan-Japanese rugby union player. He plays as a flanker. In 2004, he obtained Japanese citizenship. He is the brother of Lopeti Oto, who played for the Japanese national rugby union team in the 1995 Rugby World Cup.

Oto plays for Toshiba Brave Lupus. He has 12 caps for Japan, with 4 tries scored, 20 points in aggregate, from 2001 to 2007. He was present at the 2007 Rugby World Cup, playing a single match, in the 91–3 loss to Australia. He has been absent from his National Team since then.
