= Kazuaki Takahashi =

Japan international rugby union player

- Born: 31 January 1968 (age 58) Osaka Prefecture, Japan
- Height: 183 cm (6 ft 0 in)
- Weight: 102 kg (225 lb)
- School: Josho Keiko Gakuen High School
- University: Osaka University of Health and Sport Sciences

Rugby union career
- Position: Prop
Amateur team(s)
Years	Team	Apps	(Points)
1986-1990	Osaka University of Health and Sport Sciences		
Senior career
Years	Team	Apps	(Points)
1991-1999	Toyota		
International career
Years	Team	Apps	(Points)
1990-1997	Japan	21	(5)

Kazuaki Takahashi (高橋一彰, Takahashi Kazuaki; born 31 January 1968 in Osaka) is a former Japanese rugby union player who played as a prop.

== Career ==
Takahashi attended Josho Keiko Gakuen High School and Osaka University of Health and Sport Sciences, where for the latter he played in its rugby club between 1986 and 1990, winning the Kansai Cup in 1987 and 1989. Since his graduation from university, Takahashi joined Toyota Motors, with which he played for his entire career, winning the All-Japan Rugby Company Championship in 1999 and the East Japan League in 1995, 1998 and 1999, as well, arrived in the All Japan Championship final in 1999.

== International career ==
Takahashi won his first cap during the match against Fiji, in Tokyo, on 4 March 1990. He was also part of the 1991 Rugby World Cup, although he did not play any match in the tournament. Takahashi also played for Japan in the 1995 Rugby World Cup, playing two matches in the tournament. His last cap was against Hong Kong, in Tokyo, on 29 June 1997.

== After retirement ==
As of 8 April 2015, along with fellow former Toyota Motors player and Japanese international Lopeti Oto, Takahashi was named ambassador for the 2019 Rugby World Cup in Japan.
