= Joeli Lotawa =

Fijian rugby player (born 1974)

- Full name: Joeli Kagi Lotawa
- Born: 5 August 1974 (age 52) Nadi, Fiji
- Height: 5 ft 9 in (175 cm)
- Weight: 242 lb (110 kg)

Rugby union career
- Position: Hooker
International career
Years	Team	Apps	(Points)
2004–06	Fiji	4	(0)
2004	Pacific Islanders	1	(0)

Joeli Kagi Lotawa (born 5 August 1974) is a Fijian former international rugby union player.

Lotawa comes from the village of Saunaka, outside Nadi.

A hooker, Lotawa was capped four times for Fiji between 2004 and 2006. He toured Australia with a combined Pacific Islanders team in 2004 and came on off the bench in a Test against the Springboks in Gosford. After retiring, Lotawa was on the coaching panel of Nadi and since 2023 has been forwards coach for Yasawa.

== See also ==
- List of Fiji national rugby union players
