= Hirofumi Ouchi =

Japan international rugby union player

- Born: January 26, 1968 (age 58) Hiroshima Prefecture, Japan
- School: Takehara High School
- University: Ryukoku University
- Occupation: Buddhist head priest

Rugby union career
- Position: Flanker
Amateur team(s)
Years	Team	Apps	(Points)
1991-1997	Ryukoku University Rugby Football Club		
Senior career
Years	Team	Apps	(Points)
1989-1991, 1994-1997	Ricoh		
International career
Years	Team	Apps	(Points)
1989-1994	Japan	5	(4)
Coaching career
- Years: Team
- 2012-: Ryukoku University RFC

Hirofumi Ouchi (大内寛文, Ōuchi Hirofumi), (born 26 January 1968 in Hiroshima) is a former Japanese rugby union player who played as flanker. He is currently the coach of Ryukoku University Rugby Football Club.

== Biography ==
Residing in the Chōzen-ji temple, in Takehara, Hiroshima Prefecture, he was a Jōdo Shinshū Honganji-ha trainee Buddhist priest. After graduating from Takehara High School, Ouchi started to play for Ricoh. He debuted for the Japan national team during the match against Korea, at Colombo, on 27 October 1990. In 1991, in order to inherit his parents' home, Ouchi entered Ryukoku University Faculty of Junior College, at the same time, joining its rugby club. At the time, the team was in the Kansai University A League A, but when joining the team, Ouchi was motivated. Since 1993, he played in the All Japan Rugby University Championship for six consecutive years. In addition, Ouchi joined Ryukoku University's faculty of letters and Buddhist studies. After graduating, he joined Ricoh. also, after retiring as player in 1997, Ouchi followed his family's footsteps and became the head priest of Chōzen-ji temple. As of April 2012, he was appointed as coach of Ryukoku University Rugby Football Club.
