= Lemalu Tate Simi =

Samoan poet, rugby manager, and diplomat (1952–2014)

High Commissioner for Samoa to Australia
- In office January 2009 – 17 April 2014
- Prime Minister: Tuilaʻepa Saʻilele Malielegaoi
- O le Ao o le Malo: Tui Ātua Tupua Tamasese Efi
- Preceded by: Le’iataua Kirifoti Eteuati

Chief Executive Officer of the Ministry of Commerce, Industry and Labour
- In office unknown

President of the Samoa Red Cross Society
- In office 1995–2009

Personal details
- Born: 19 October 1952
- Died: 17 April 2014 (aged 61) Fagali’i, Samoa
- Spouse: Peseta Noumea Simi
- Children: 4
- Education: Samoa College; Wellington Polytechnic; New Zealand Central Institute of Technology

Lemalu Samau Tate Simi (19 October 1952 - 17 April 2014) was a Samoan poet, rugby manager, civil servant, and diplomat. He served as Samoa's High Commissioner to Australia from 2009 to 2014.

Lemalu trained as an architect in New Zealand and subsequently worked as a civil servant, rising to the position of chief executive of the Ministry of Commerce, Industry and Labour. In January 2009 he was appointed High Commissioner to Australia, a position he held until his death in 2014. He also served as team manager of the Samoa national rugby union team, and as president of the Samoa Red Cross Society.

== Works ==
- A deeper song : poems (1992)
