= Tomasi Lovo =

- Born: 5 December 1960 (age 65) Fiji
- Height: 5 ft 8 in (1.73 m)
- Weight: 174 lb (79 kg)
- School: Queen Victoria School

Rugby union career
- Position(s): Fly-half, Wing
Amateur team(s)
Years	Team	Apps	(Points)
–	Queen Victoria School RFC		
Senior career
Years	Team	Apps	(Points)
198?-199?	Nasinu		
International career
Years	Team	Apps	(Points)
1982-1990	Tonga	8	(40)
1989-1993	Fiji	9	(8)
National sevens team
Years	Team		Comps
1986-89	Tonga		1986-87

Tomasi Lovo (born 5 November 1960), is a Fijian former rugby union footballer, he played as a fly-half or wing.

== Career ==
A former student of Queen Victoria School, Lovo played for Tonga between 1986 and 1989, playing also for Tonga Sevens in the 1986-87 Hong Kong Sevens and Fiji. He was first capped for Fiji on 28 October 1990, against Scotland at Murrayfield. He also played the 1991 Rugby World Cup, playing two matches, against Canada and France. During the match of Fiji against England at Lautoka, on 16 July 1991, ended 27–13, Lovo drew the line of the English defence before unloading to an unmarked Tawake to seal the famous victory but the game was not yet over, there was one last play of the match left. His last cap for Fiji was against Tonga, at Suva, on 12 June 1993.

In 1988, he also played for the Tonga national football team against Hertha 03 Zehlendorf.
