= Ryukoku University Faculty of Junior College =

Coordinates: 34°57′52.54″N 135°46′3.27″E

- 龍谷大学短期大学部
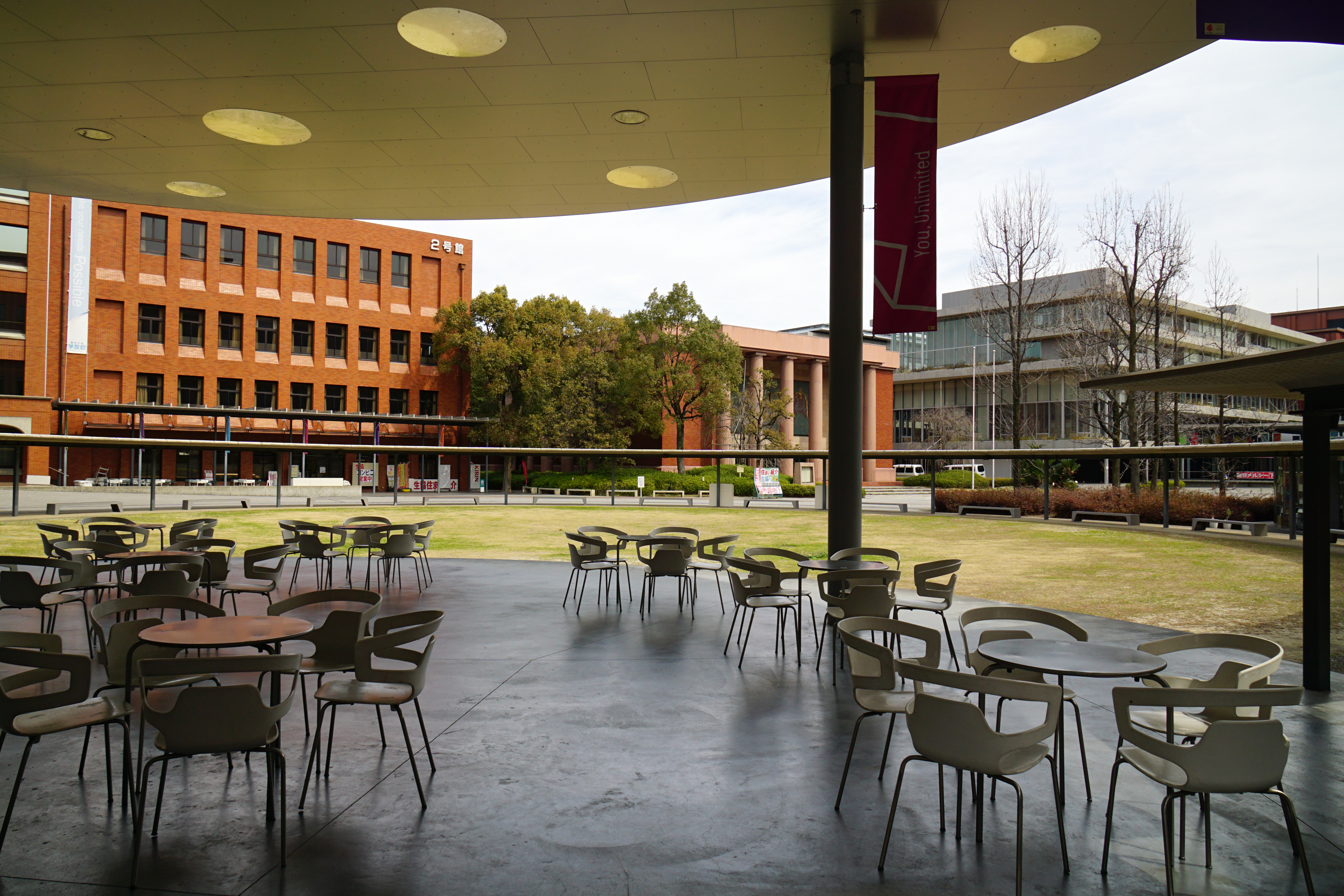
- Type: Private
- Established: 1950
- Location: Fushimi-ku, Kyoto, Japan
- Website: http://www.human.ryukoku.ac.jp/ryutan.html

Ryukoku University Faculty of Junior College (龍谷大学短期大学部, Ryūkoku Daigaku Tanki Daigakubu) is a private junior college in the city of Kyoto, Japan. The college opened in 1950, and is now attached to Ryukoku University.

== Departments ==
- Social welfare studies
- Child care studies
