= Ewan MacMillan =

Zimbabwean rugby union player (born 1971)

- Full name: Ewan Alexander MacMillan
- Born: 3 January 1971 (age 55) Chinhoyi, Rhodesia
- School: Lomagundi College
- Occupation: Gold trader

Rugby union career
- Position: Scrum-half
International career
Years	Team	Apps	(Points)
1991–93	Zimbabwe	4	(0)

Ewan Alexander MacMillan (born 3 January 1971) is a Zimbabwean businessman and former rugby union player.

== Biography ==
MacMillan was born in Chinhoyi, to parents who had emigrated from Perth, Scotland during the 1960s.

Educated at Lomagundi College, MacMillan was a scrum-half for the Zimbabwe national rugby union team in the early 1990s, earning four caps. He made the Zimbabwe squad for the 1991 Rugby World Cup. After the side's loss to Ireland in the opening match, MacMillan was favoured over veteran scrum-half Andy Ferreira for their remaining two fixtures, against Scotland at Murrayfield and Japan at Ravenhill Stadium. He has a son Bruce who also played for Zimbabwe.

MacMillan followed his father Ian into the gold trading business and is a convicted smuggler.
