= Samoa Red Cross Society =

Humanitarian organization in Samoa

- Founded: 1952
- Type: Non-profit organisation
- Purpose: Humanitarian Aid
- Location: Samoa
- President: Jerry Brunt
- Affiliations: International Committee of the Red Cross; International Federation of Red Cross and Red Crescent Societies

Samoa Red Cross Society was founded in 1952 as branch of the New Zealand Red Cross Society. It was later closed, then reactivated in 1981. It has its headquarters in Apia. The president is Jerry Brunt.
