= Francisco Irarrázaval =

Argentine rugby union player (born 1971)

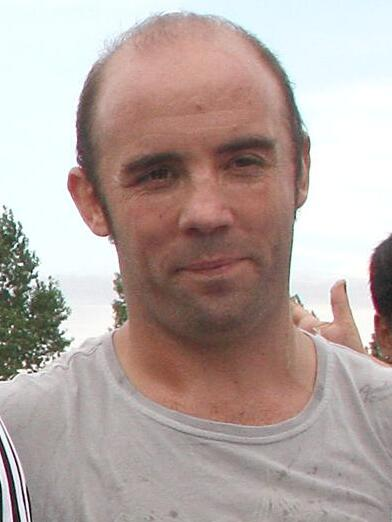
- Born: Francisco José Irarrázaval; January 25, 1971 (age 55) Mendoza

Rugby union career
- Position: Flanker
Senior career
Years	Team	Apps	(Points)
198?-2008	Club Newman		
International career
Years	Team	Apps	(Points)
1991-1992	Argentina	3	(0)

Francisco José Irarrázaval (born 5 October 1971 in Mendoza) is a former Argentine rugby union player. He played as a flanker.

He played for Club Newman, finishing his career in 2007/08.

He had 3 caps for Argentina, from 1991 to 1992, without ever scoring. He had his debut at the 35-12 loss to Samoa, in Pontypridd, at 13 October 1991, for the 1991 Rugby World Cup. It would be his only presence at the competition. He had his last game for the "Pumas" at the 43-34 win over Spain, in Madrid, at 24 October 1992, in a tour.
