= Guillermo Lamarca =

Argentine rugby union coach

Guillermo Willy Lamarca (born Buenos Aires, 1949) is a former Argentine rugby union player and a current coach. He is professionally a business administrator.

== Playing career ==
He started his rugby career aged 13, at Club Universitario de Buenos Aires, moving to Hindú Club, in 1966. He moved to Jockey Club of Salta, in 1972, where he was player and coach from 1972 to 1976. He moved afterwards to Tucumán Rugby Club in September 1976. He played there until 1978, when a serious injury forced him to leave competition.

== Coaching career ==
He became coach of Tucumán Rugby Club in 1978, moving the following year to Lawn Tennis, where he was winner of the National Championship, in 1980 and 1981. He was coach of the Tucumán selection in 1981 and 1982. Once again, he would be coach of Tucumán, from 1988 to 1990, winning the National Championship, in 1989 and 1990. He was the coach of the U-19 team of Tucumán selection in 1991.

He was one of the two head coaches of Argentina, from 1990 to 1992, with Luis Gradín. The duo led the "Pumas" at the 1991 Rugby World Cup, but weren't able to avoid the elimination after the 1st round. He was the coach of the "Pumitas" at the World Cup held in 1991, becoming world champions. He lost the final the following year, in 1992.
