= Giuseppe Zannoni =

Italian painter (1849–1903)

Giuseppe Zannoni (1849–1903) was an Italian painter.

== Biography ==
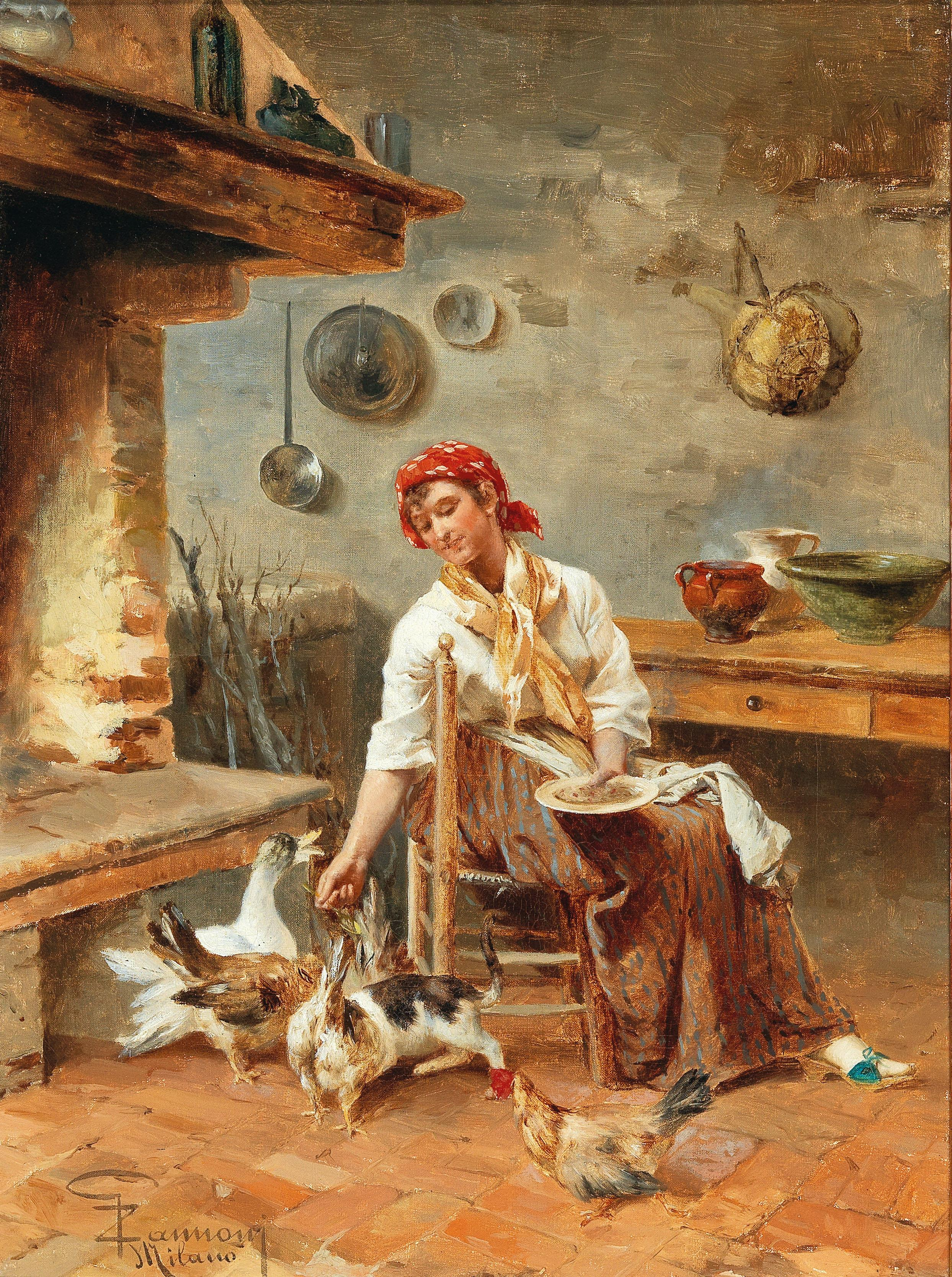
Giuseppe Zannoni, Feeding the Animals (oil on canvas)

Born in Verona, Zannoni studied at the Cignaroli Academy, receiving prizes at local exhibitions from 1865 to 1871. He travelled to Milan with his cousin, the sculptor Ugo Zannoni, and enrolled in the Brera Academy, where he was a pupil of Giuseppe Bertini. In 1877 he exhibited the painting Marc Anthony reveals the bloody cloak of Caesar to the Roman people in Naples. In 1881 in Milan, he exhibited three genre paintings: Arrivo degli sposi; Trastulli e ammonizioni; Cacciatore e volpe. In 1884 in Rome he exhibited Stanchezza; Vendemmia; Scorciatoia; Manca l ' acqua alle cascine; Lungo il Torrente di Val di Muggio, and Genio in erba. Among other works Il piasto; L'ozio ingannato (1874); La favorita, and La preghiera.

In 1887 in Venice he exhibited Sentinella; In assenza della nonna; Studi in cucina; Nella stalla; Prima neve and Buon giorno. In 1891, he sent to the Brera annual exhibition Luna di miele and Al mercato.

He also painted frescoes in various churches, mainly in Verona, including the church of the Filippini, where in 1890, he painted a Sacred Heart and Saints and an Assumption of Mary for the church of Santa Maria alla Porta, Milan. He died from the consequences of a fall from a scaffold on May 28, at Monteforte d'Alpone, ten days after beginning to paint the Trinity fresco at the apse of the local parish church.
