= Max Olsson =

Fijian rugby union footballer (born 1967)

- Born: Maxwell George Olsson; 19 July 1967 (age 59) Fiji
- Height: 6 ft 3 in (1.91 m)
- Weight: 242 lb (110 kg)
- School: Marist Brothers High School

Rugby union career
- Position: Flanker
Amateur team(s)
Years	Team	Apps	(Points)
1987	St.Josephs Rugby Club Whakatane		
Senior career
Years	Team	Apps	(Points)
-1994	Suva		
1994-1999	Suntory		
International career
Years	Team	Apps	(Points)
1988–1991	Fiji	7	(12)

Maxwell George Olsson (born 19 July 1967), also known as Max Olsson, is a Fijian former rugby union footballer, he played as a flanker.

== Career ==
His first international match for Fiji was against Tonga, at Apia, on 31 May 1988. Olsson was also called up in the 1991 Rugby World Cup Fijian squad, where he played only the match against Romania, which was his last international cap. He played for Suva and then, in 1994, for Suntory. After retirement he works in the Fiji Rugby Union Development Unit's Leading Rugby and Development workshop and he is also National Operations manager for Fiji Gas. Max Olsson at 20 years played his first senior grade season in 1987 with St.Josephs Rugby Club in Whakatane. Max and the iconic Vesi Rauluni were recruited and coached by Vivian Hahipene of Te Teko.Max and Vesi were the first Fijian rugby import players into the Bay of Plenty and possibly into NZ. Max represented the BOP Colts and Vesi represented the BOP Seniors. In that same year they were selected into the Fiji National XV to tour South Africa. However, due to the political unrest they remained home.
