= Mosese Vosanibola =

Fijian rugby union player (born 1962)

- Born: 28 July 1962 (age 64) Nabua, Suva, Fiji
- Height: 5 ft 4 in (1.63 m)
- Weight: 165 lb (75 kg)
- Notable relative: Joni Vosanibola (son)

Rugby union career
- Position: Scrum-half
Senior career
Years	Team	Apps	(Points)
-	Nabua		
International career
Years	Team	Apps	(Points)
1991	Fiji	2	(0)

Mosese Vosanibola, spelt also as Mosese Vosanibole (born 28 July 1962 in Nabua) is a Fijian rugby union player. He plays as scrum-half. He is nicknamed Moses and Jack Dolly.

== Career ==
Vosanibola played for Nabua during his club career. He played for Fiji B in the match against England national rugby union team on 1990, in Lautoka, where England was defeated 28-12, where in the 47th minute, with Vosanibola, Ifereimi Tawake and Pio Kubuvai, a try was scored by Waisale Serevi and one try scored by Vosanibola towards the end of the match, ended with a 19-13 victory for the Fijian side. Vosanibola had only two caps for the Fiji national team in 1991, the former against Tonga, at Suva on 11 June and the latter against France, in Grenoble, during the 1991 Rugby World Cup, which was his last international cap.

== Personal life ==
His son, Joni Vosanibola is also a rugby union player.

He is currently the executive committee and coaching panelist of the Nabua Rugby Club after retiring from his military career that span more than 30 years
