= Shinobu Aoki =

Japan international rugby union player

- Born: January 26, 1968 (age 58) Saitama Prefecture, Japan
- School: Daito First High School
- University: Daito Bunka University

Rugby union career
- Position: Fly-half
Amateur team(s)
Years	Team	Apps	(Points)
1983-1986	Daito Bunka University Daiichi High School		
1986-1990	Daito Bunka University		
Senior career
Years	Team	Apps	(Points)
1990-1993	Ricoh		
International career
Years	Team	Apps	(Points)
1989-1993	Japan	5	(4)
Coaching career
- Years: Team
- 2009-2012: Daito Bunka University

Shinobu Aoki (青木忍, Aoki Shinobu), (born 26 January 1968 in Saitama) is a former Japanese rugby union player who played as fly-half and former coach.

== Career ==
While at Daito First High School, Aoki won the 1985 National High School Rugby Football Tournament. The following year, he entered Daito Bunka University and had a regular position from his first year. At the 23rd edition of the National High School Rugby Football Championship of the same year, along with the Tongan players Sinali Latu and Uatesoni Namoa, who were also students for Daito Bunka, Aoki contributed to the first victory of Daito Bunka defeating Waseda University. At the 25th edition of the University championship in 1988, Daito Bunka was in the final for the second time, despite the 12-12 draw with Meiji University, as well, in this match, the teams with more tries were able to advance to the Japan Rugby Football Championship, so Daito Bunka was playing against Kobe Steel, who had the first victory in the Japan National Company Rugby Football Competition. On 28 May 1989, at the Chichibunomiya Rugby Stadium, Aoki earned his first cap for Japan in a match against Scotland. Along with Masami Horikoshi, who was also a student at the time, he formed a University student half-team (大学生ハーフ団, Daigakusei Hāfu-dan), He became a member of the squad which defeated Scotland 28-24. Then, Aoki played for Ricoh. He was also called up in the 1991 Rugby World Cup roster, but he could not play any game due to Katsuhiro Matsuo taking his place as regular fly-half. From 2009 to 2010, he was appointed as coach of his alma mater, Daito Bunka University.
