= Mario Carreras =

Argentine rugby union player (born 1966)

- Born: April 14, 1966 (age 60) Buenos Aires

Rugby union career
- Position: Number Eight
Senior career
Years	Team	Apps	(Points)
1984-1994	Olivos Rugby Club		
International career
Years	Team	Apps	(Points)
1987-1992	Argentina	12	(12)

Mario Carreras (born 14 April 1966 in Buenos Aires) is a former Argentine rugby union player. He played as a number eight.

Carreras played for Olivos Rugby Club in the Nacional de Clubes.

He had 8 caps for Argentina, scoring 3 tries, 12 points on aggregate. He had his first game at the 62–4 win over Paraguay at 30 September 1987 in Santiago, Chile for the South American Rugby Championship, aged 21 years old. He scored against the All Blacks in 1991. He was called for the 1991 Rugby World Cup, playing in three games, one as a substitute, but without scoring. He had his last game at the 12–27 loss to France at 4 July 1992, in Buenos Aires, in a friendly, aged only 26 years old.
