= Antonio Zanon =

Italian entrepreneur, agronomist and economist (1696–1770)

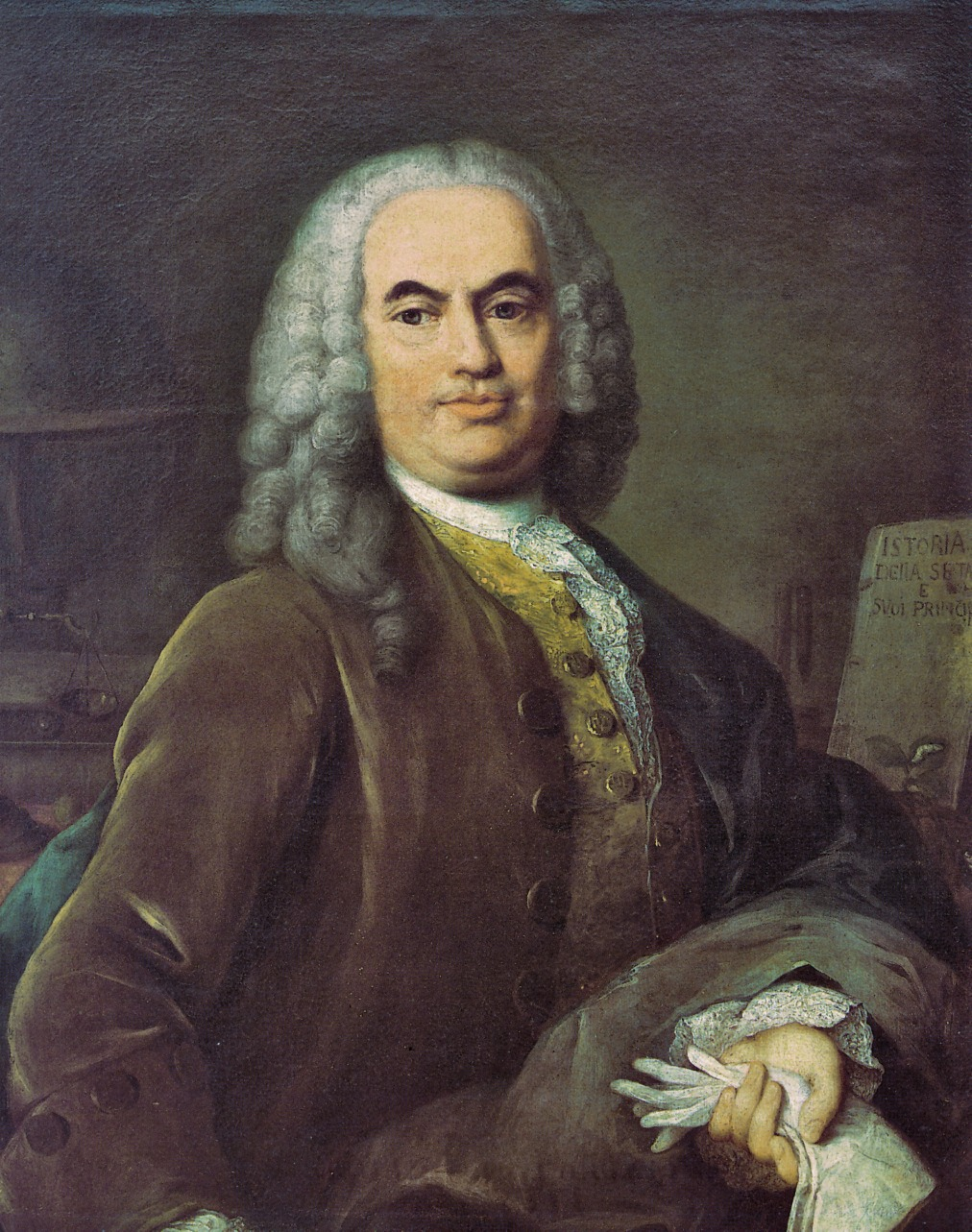
Portrait by Alessandro Longhi, 1773

Antonio Zanon (18 June 1696 – 4 December 1770) was an Italian agro-industrial entrepreneur, writer, and advocate for economic development. Coming from a family of skilled artisans, Zanon played a major role in the development of the Friulian silk textile industry.

== Life and work ==
Zanon was born in Udine to Giuseppe and Francesca Vezzi both belonging to crafts manufacturing families. His father had established the Bolognese method of silk reeling in Borgo Grazzano. His father came from a Jewish Caprileis family and had changed his surname with Count Giovanni Giuseppe di Strassoldo as godfather during his baptism. After studying at the Barnabite College in Udine, Zanon managed the family business after the death of his father and brother Francesco. He married Lucia Marsoni, from a wealthy family in Spilimbergo in 1738 and moved to Venice where he established a fabric shop. Here he sold velvet and silk from his factory in Risano. His business grew and he had nearly two hundred people employed. He developed wealthy and influential patrons among his clientele including Pietro Grimani, Nicolò Tron, Filippo Farsetti, Gasparo Gozzi, Francesco Griselini, and Francesco Scottoni. He developed ties between agricultural production in Friuli and their sales in Venice. He attempted to expand his silk trade across the Atlantic but this did not succeed. He also developed wine making and helped establish Picolit wine in collaboration with Count Fabio Asquini to compete with Hungarian wines.

In the 1730s he published two works on silk industry Notizie storiche sopra il commercio e l'arte della seta and L'arte della seta. He helped establish the Società d'agricoltura pratica to teach agricultural techniques. Zanon died of pulmonary infection in Venice.
