= Palemia Lilomaiava =

Samoan rugby union player

- Born: 23 March 1960 (age 66) Lepea, Samoa

Rugby union career
- Position: Prop
Senior career
Years	Team	Apps	(Points)
????	Marist St. Joseph		
International career
Years	Team	Apps	(Points)
1988-1993	Samoa	1	(0)

Palemia Sialesa Lilomaiava (born in Lepea, on 23 March 1960) is a Samoan rugby union player. He plays as a prop. He is a relative of the fellow rugby union player Robert Lilomaiava.

== Career ==
He was called up for the Samoan team in the 1991 Rugby World Cup, although he never played any game. His first and last international match was against New Zealand at the Eden Park on 31 July 1993.
