= Dranivesi Baleiwai =

Fijian former rugby union footballer

- Born: April 17, 1964 (age 62)
- Height: 5 ft 8 in (173 cm)
- Weight: 215 lb (98 kg)

Rugby union career
- Position: Hooker
Senior career
Years	Team	Apps	(Points)
199?-19??	Nadi		
International career
Years	Team	Apps	(Points)
1990-1991	Fiji	5	(0)

Dranivesi Baleiwai (born 17 April 1964) is a Fijian former rugby union footballer, he played as hooker.

== Career ==
He played for the Nadi provincial team. His official debut for Fiji was during a test match against Japan, in Tokyo, on 4 March 1989, which ended in a 32-6 victory for the Fijians, where Baleiwai started as a substitute, replacing Alipate Rabitu at the 76th minute. On 5 December 1990, he played as a starting member during an away match against Hong Kong, in Hong Kong. Before that, he was also capped during the match against New South Wales on 9 April 1989. Baleiwai also played during the test match against England, in Lautoka, on 16 July 1991, where Fiji defeated England 27-13. He was also part of the 1991 Rugby World Cup roster, where he played all of the three pool stage matches, with the match against Romania, at Brive-la-Gaillarde being his last international cap.

On 19 June 1993, he switched to rugby league and as part of the national team, he played the test match against Papua New Guinea, lost 24-35.

In 2017, Baleiwai was appointed as vice-chairman of the Nausori Cowboys, a rugby league club previously known as Nausori Bulldogs which ceased to exist and was revived in 2013.
