= Epeli Naituivau =

Fijian rugby union footballer

- Born: 22 May 1962 (age 64) Fiji
- Height: 6 ft 2 in (1.88 m)
- Weight: 252 lb (114 kg)

Rugby union career
- Position: Prop
Senior career
Years	Team	Apps	(Points)
199?-199?	Suva		
International career
Years	Team	Apps	(Points)
1990–1999	Fiji	9	(8)

Epeli Naituivau (born 22 May 1962) is a Fijian former rugby union footballer, who played as prop. He is one of the eight members of the country's armed forces to play for Fiji in a Rugby World Cup squad, alongside Koli Rakoroi, Elia Rokowailoa, Rusiate Namoro, Tom Mitchell, Alifereti Dere and Setareki Tawake.

== Career ==
Naituivau debuted for Fiji against Tonga, at Nuku'alofa, on 24 March 1990. He called in the 1991 Rugby World Cup squad, where he played against Romania and Canada, as well in the 1999 Rugby World Cup squad, where he played against Namibia and England, the latter being his last international cap.

== Post-retirement ==
Naituivau coached Fiji Barbarians in 2009, and in 2010, he was technical advisor and forwards coach for Fiji Warriors. Until 2013, he was appointed Development Officer by Fiji Rugby Union
