= Tatsuya Maeda (rugby union) =

- Born: 23 September 1968 Osaka Prefecture, Japan
- Height: 172 cm (5 ft 8 in)
- Weight: 73 kg (161 lb)
- School: Shimamoto High School
- University: Kyoto Sangyo University

Rugby union career
- Position(s): Fullback, Center, Fly-half
Amateur team(s)
Years	Team	Apps	(Points)
- Shimamoto High School
-1990	Sangyo University RFC		
Senior career
Years	Team	Apps	(Points)
1990-1995	NTT Kansai		
International career
Years	Team	Apps	(Points)
1991-1995	Japan	4	(26)

Tatsuya Maeda (前田達也, Maeda Tastuya) (born Osaka, 23 September 1968) is a former Japanese rugby union player who played as a fullback, as well as center and fly-half.

== Biography ==
Maeda attended Shimamoto High School and Kyoto Sangyo University, for whose club he played during the All-Japan Rugby University Championship. After graduating from Kyoto Sangyo University, he joined NTT Kansai Rugby Football Club. He also played for Japan, with his first cap being during the match against USA, at Chicago, on 4 May 1991. In the same year, Maeda was called up for the second edition of the Rugby World Cup, although he did not play any match in the tournament. Maeda was last capped for Japan during a match against Tonga, at Nagoya, on 11 February 1995.
