= Ralph Keyes =

Ralph Keyes may refer to:

- Ralph Keyes (author) (born 1945), American author
- Ralph Keyes (rugby union) (born 1961), Irish rugby union player

== See also ==
- Ralph S. Keyser (1883–1955), United States Marine Corps general
