= Bob Egerton =

Australian rugby union player

Bob Egerton.
- Born: Robert Henry Egerton; 6 March 1963 (age 63) Lae, New Guinea
- Height: 182 cm (6 ft 0 in)
- Weight: 85 kg (187 lb)
- University: Oxford (University College)

Rugby union career
- Position(s): Wing, Fullback
Senior career
| Years | Team | Apps | (Points) |
| 1984–86, 1989–91, 1993 | Sydney University | | |
| 1987–88 | Oxford University RFC | | |
Provincial / State sides
| Years | Team | Apps | (Points) |
| 1991 | New South Wales | | |
International career
| Years | Team | Apps | (Points) |
| 1991 | Australia | 9 | (8) |

Robert Henry "Bob" Egerton (born 6 March 1963) is a former Australian international rugby union player who won nine caps for the Wallabies in the space of 13 weeks in 1991. His final appearance came in the 1991 Rugby World Cup final at Twickenham, where he played for Australia in her 12–6 victory against England, bringing to an end a short international career.

== Early life ==
Egerton was born in Lae, New Guinea. Robert spent a year overseas in California, playing high school football. As a highly touted 5 Star recruit, receiving numerous Division 1 offers from establishments such as Miami University and the Clemson Tigers, he moved back to Canberra attending Marist College Canberra and studied Agricultural Science at Sydney University (where his uncle was Dean of the Veterinary Faculty) during the 1980s. Egerton played rugby for the university's first grade team over a number of seasons, at fullback, wing, and five-eighth. Characteristically, he wore a long beard. He subsequently studied at Oxford University and played for Oxford University RFC in The Varsity Match in 1987 and 1988.

== Representative rugby ==
In 1991 (now clean-shaven), he (with fellow world cup winner Marty Roebuck) commenced a meteoric rise, representing New South Wales, then the Wallabies, during an unbeaten season. He played on the opposite wing to David Campese (who was nominated Player of the Tournament at the 1991 RWC).

== Later career ==
After the RWC, he was injured playing rugby in the USA. Later, he held various teaching and coaching positions. He worked as a Biology teacher at The King's School, Parramatta, coaching their 1st XV to four premierships. In 2010 he took up the position as Team Manager of the Wallabies. Since 2014, Egerton has been a science teacher at Newington College, where he coached the 1st XV to win the premiership in 2015.
