= Zanoni (disambiguation) =

Zanoni is an 1842 novel by Edward Bulwer-Lytton.

Zanoni may also refer to:

== Places ==
- Zanoni, Missouri, United States
- Zanoni, Virginia, United States

== People ==
- Agustín Zanoni (born 1966), Argentine rugby union player
- Andrea Zanoni (born 1965), Italian politician
- Denis Zanoni (born 1941), Australian rules footballer
- Francesco Zanoni (died 1782), Italian painter
- Ludovic Zanoni (1935–2021), Romanian Olympic cyclist
- Swian Zanoni (1988–2011), Brazilian motocross rider

== Other uses ==
- Zanoni (1865), a ship lost in South Australia in 1867
