= Don James (rugby union) =

American rugby union player (born 1964)

- Full name: Donald William James Jr.
- Born: September 26, 1964 (age 62)
- Height: 6 ft 3 in (191 cm)
- Weight: 235 lb (107 kg)
- University: UC Berkeley; University of Oxford

Rugby union career
- Position: Prop
International career
Years	Team	Apps	(Points)
1990–94	United States	9	(0)

Donald William James Jr. (born September 26, 1964) is an American former international rugby union player.

A tighthead prop, James won four national titles at the University of California, Berkeley, where he also played football as a defensive lineman. He earned second-team All-Pac-10 honors for football in 1983 and played in the 1984 Japan Bowl.

James played rugby with Oxford University in 1989, appearing alongside countryman Gary Hein in the Varsity match, to gain his blue. He was capped nine times for the United States during the early 1990s.

== See also ==
- List of United States national rugby union players
