= Shuji Nakashima =

Japan international rugby union player

- Born: Shuji Nakashima; July 8, 1963 (age 63) Yamaguchi Prefecture, Japan
- School: Otsu High School, Yamaguchi
- University: Meiji University

Rugby union career
- Position: Flanker
Amateur team(s)
Years	Team	Apps	(Points)
1980-1983	Otsu High School		
1983-1987	Meiji University RFC		
Senior career
Years	Team	Apps	(Points)
1985–1998	NEC		
International career
Years	Team	Apps	(Points)
1989–1991	Japan	11	(0)
Coaching career
- Years: Team
- 1999-2003: Japan (forwards coach)

Shuji Nakashima (中島修二, Nakashma Shūji), (born Yamaguchi, July 8, 1963), is a former Japanese rugby union player. He played as a flanker.

== Career ==
He first played for the Otsu High School, and then for Meiji University. At the 22nd National College Rugby Football Championship in 1985, while having drawn 12–12 with Keio University, he experienced the first victory of the team in 4 years. After that, Nakashima joined NEC (later NEC Green Rockets). On May 28, 1989, at Chichibunomiya Rugby Stadium, Tokyo, he debuted against Scotland, earning his first cap for the Japan national rugby union team. He contributed to Japan's first victory showing success throughout the match, later he was given the MVP grade and was praised by the then head coach of Japan, Hiroaki Shukuzawa. After that, as the player number 7, he got a chance to participate regularly in the 1991 Rugby World Cup until the match against Scotland, at Murrayfield. After his retirement as player, Nakashima was still in the Japan national team, as forwards coach between 1999 and 2003.

== Personal life ==
His son, Tsubasa Nakashima, plays rugby for Waseda University since 2013. In 2017, he is a member of East Coast Bays Rugby football club in Auckland, New Zealand.
