= Katsuhiro Matsuo =

Japan international rugby union player

- Born: January 6, 1964 (age 62) Miyazaki Prefecture, Japan
- Height: 5 ft 8 in (1.73 m)
- Weight: 154 lb (70 kg)
- School: Nobeoka Higashi High School
- University: Doshisha University

Rugby union career
- Position: Fly-half
Amateur team(s)
Years	Team	Apps	(Points)
1980-1985	Doshisha University RFC		
Senior career
Years	Team	Apps	(Points)
1986-1995	World		
International career
Years	Team	Apps	(Points)
1986-1995	Japan	23	(61)
Coaching career
- Years: Team
- –: Laos sevens
- –: Surugadai University RFC

Katsuhiro Matsuo (松尾勝博, Matsuo Katsuhiro) (born 6 January 1964, in Miyazaki Prefecture) is a former Japanese rugby union player who played as fly-half and coach.

== Junior career ==
After graduating from Nobeoka High School and going to Doshisha University, at the time, he contributed to the victories in the All-Japan University Rugby Championship in 1983 and 1984 editions.

== Professional career ==
In 1986, he joined World, and played for them until his retirement in 1995.

== International career ==
In the same year, Matsuo had his first cap for Japan against USA. In the following year, he took part in the 1987 Rugby World Cup, which was the first Rugby World Cup. In the pool A match against England, he played as centre due to Seiji Hirao playing as fly-half in the lineup. Three years later, Shinobu Aoki, who, like Matsuo, was part of the squad that won against Scotland in 1989, was his direct rival for the position as regular fly-half in the Japan national team after the Asia-Pacific qualifiers, but during the 1991 Rugby World Cup, Matsuo took Aoki's place as the regular fly-half for Japan. He took part at all the three pool matches of the World Cup first round, and contributed to the victory in the final pool match against Zimbabwe. Later, he continued his duties as Japan national team. He was once again part of the Japanese team at the 1995 Rugby World Cup, although he never played any matches in the tournament. In total he earned 23 international caps for Japan.

== Coaching career ==
After retiring, Matsuo was appointed by JRFU as a resource coach, coaching the Laos national rugby sevens team. As of 2012, he was appointed as coach for Surugadai University RFC.
