= Agustín Zanoni =

- Born: Luis Agustín Zanoni; October 18, 1966 (age 60) Buenos Aires

Rugby union career
- Position: Lock
Senior career
Years	Team	Apps	(Points)
198?-199?	Pueyrredón		
International career
Years	Team	Apps	(Points)
1991	Argentina	0	(0)

Luis Agustín Zanoni (born Buenos Aires, 18 October 1966) is a former Argentine rugby union player.

He played for Pueyrredón Rugby Club.

He was called for Argentina for the 1991 Rugby World Cup, but was one of the two players who was never capped for the "Pumas".
