= Andy Booth (rugby union) =

Rugby Union Player

- Full name: Andrew Howell Booth
- Born: 8 December 1967 (age 58) Swansea, Wales
- Height: 5 ft 10 in (178 cm)
- Weight: 189 lb (86 kg)

Rugby union career
- Position: Scrum-half
International career
Years	Team	Apps	(Points)
1989–91	Wales		

Andrew Howell Booth (born 8 December 1967) is a Welsh former professional rugby union player.

Booth, born and raised in Swansea, attended Bishop Gore School. He played for Cardiff, Swansea, and Neath over the course of his career, as well as some varsity rugby while earning his blue at Cambridge University.

A scrum-half, Booth was notably on the bench for Wales on nine occasions, without ever gaining a cap. He sat on the bench for the entire 1991 Rugby World Cup, where starting scrum-half Robert Jones played every minute. This makes him the only Wales player to have been named on a World Cup squad but never capped (excluding replacement players).

Booth is a financial consultant by profession. He is the brother-in-law of Wales international Stuart Davies, who married Booth's sister Lorna. Davies was Booth's captain during his time at Swansea.

== See also ==
- List of Wales national rugby union players
