= Mosese Moala =

Tongan rugby union player

- Born: 14 June 1978 (age 48) Tonga
- Height: 192 cm (6 ft 4 in)
- Weight: 130 kg (287 lb; 20 st 7 lb)

Rugby union career
- Position: Prop
Senior career
Years	Team	Apps	(Points)
2006–2010	Biarritz	51	(5)
2010–2011	Agen	14	(0)
2011–2012	Périgueux	12	(0)
2013–2017	Tulle	53	(45)
- Correct as of 5 May 2021
International career
Years	Team	Apps	(Points)
2004	Tonga	2	(0)
- Correct as of 5 May 2021

Mosese Moala (born 14 June 1978 in Tonga) was a Tongan rugby union player. His playing position was prop. He was called up to represent Tonga in the 2007 Rugby World Cup, but withdrew through injury during the tournament without making any appearances. He though made two appearances for Tonga in 2004, and made appearances for Biarritz, Agen and other French sides.
