= Beecroft Rugby Club =

Australian rugby union club, based in Sydney

Beecroft
- Full name: Beecroft Rugby Club Inc
- Nickname: Crofties
- Founded: 1998; 28 years ago
- Location: Sydney, New South Wales, Australia
- Ground(s): Headen Park, Sinclair Avenue, Thornleigh
- League: NSWSRU
Team kit

Official website
- beecroftrugby.com

Beecroft Rugby Club is an amateur rugby union club which fields five Grade teams and two Colts teams in the Premier 1st Division of the New South Wales Suburban Rugby Union.

The club grew as a logical extension of a junior clubs that have provided sporting opportunity through Rugby for generations of boys and young men in the Hills district. The club has relations with all local junior clubs within the area, and is committed to the best ideals of sport and social integration for the youth of the area.

== History ==
Beecroft Rugby Club had its origins in the St Leo’s Old Boys RUFC, which thrived for years until the school changed focus and its player stream dried up. It then amalgamated with Ku-Ring-Gai High Old Boys, but over time it became obvious that there were too many suburban clubs on the north shore for the number of available players. The club then moved to Hills area, where the Beecroft Rugby Club was born and thrives to this day.

In the fifteen rugby seasons Beecroft has been in the suburban competition, the club has made fifteen grand finals in various grades. It has virtually rocketed through the various divisions of the NSW Suburban Rugby Union competition and is currently in the 1st Division of that competition. The club has also competed in the Under 85 kg competition since its inauguration in 2006. In the three years of the competition Beecroft has competed in each Grand Final, winning the State Title in 2006 and 2008.

From 2006 to 2008 in particular the club had tremendous success on the playing field. In 2006 while in the 2nd Division the 1st Grade team won the Barraclough Cup and the 4th Grade team the Richardson Cup. In 2007 this feat was repeated with the 1st Grade team again winning the Barraclough Cup and the 4th Grade team likewise winning the Richardson Cup.

In 2008, the club was promoted to 1st Division following its success in the 2nd Division competition in 2007, and had quite a successful season with the 1st Grade team reaching the Kentwell Cup grand final and finishing in fourth place on the Club Championship table.

== Honours ==
Club Awards

- 2008 - NSW Suburban 1st Division Club of the Year
- 2007 - NSW Suburban 2nd Division Club Champions
- 2006 - NSW Suburban Rugby Club of the Year and NSW Suburban 2nd Division Club of the Year
- 2003 - NSW Suburban 2nd Division Club Champions
- 2001 - NSW Suburban Rugby Club of the Year and NSW Suburban 3rd Division Club Champions

== Premierships ==
1st Grade

- 2007 - Barraclough Cup
- 2006 - Barraclough Cup
- 2002 - Barraclough Cup

2nd Grade

- 2001 - Farrant Cup

3rd Grade

- 2001 - Campbell Cup

4th Grade

- 2007 - Richardson Cup
- 2006 - Richardson Cup
- 2002 - Richardson Cup

Under 85 kg

- 2008 - Premiers
- 2006 - Premiers

== Club Captains ==
- 2013 - Angus Donovan
- 2012 - Tom Berkhout
- 2011 - Tom Berkout
- 2010 - Tom Berkhout
- 2009 - Tom Berkhout
- 2008 - Nick Childs
- 2007 - Nick Childs
- 2006 - Nick Childs
- 2005 - Nick Childs
- 2004 - Mark Baker
- 2003 - Mark Baker
- 2002 - Mark Baker
- 2001 - Mark Baker
- 2000 - Mark Baker
- 1999 - Paul Warton
- 1998 - Dave Proctor

== NSW Suburban XV Representatives ==
- A. Dwyer
- A. Rasuka
- B. Walters
- D. Berkhout
- D. O’Riordan
- D. Schofield
- J. Walters
- S. Cumming
- S. Guest
- T. Bowen
- T. Kelly
- G. Konz
- R. McCann
- V. Seuseu
- G. Donian
- T. Nakauta
- S. Yalayaia
- M. Daff
- B. Gordon
- I. Meehan
- J. "The Rhino" Ryan
- M. Dick

== NSW Suburban Under 85kg ==
- A. Dwyer
- D. Berkhout
- D. Schofield
- L. Broughton-Rouse

== Club Patrons ==
- Mayor for Hornsby - Cr Nick Berman
