= Gary Hein =

US international rugby union player

- Born: Gary Mel Hein; March 26, 1965 (age 61) Los Angeles, California
- University: University of California (Social Sciences and Modern Corporations bachelor's degree); Oxford University(Masters in Jurisprudence)
- Notable relative(s): Mel Hein (grandfather); Mel Hein Jr. (father)

Rugby union career
- Position: Wing
Amateur team(s)
Years	Team	Apps	(Points)
1983–1994	University of California		
1989–1990	Oxford University		
International career
Years	Team	Apps	(Points)
1987–1994	United States	25	(12)

Gary Mel Hein (born March 26, 1965, in Los Angeles) is a former American rugby union player. He played as a wing. He is grandson of the late New York Giants player and Pro Football Hall of Famer Mel Hein and son of the pole vaulter Mel Hein Jr., who briefly held the U.S. indoor pole vault record with a jump of 16'5 3/4" at the Cow Palace in San Francisco, California.

== Career ==
Hein started his career in 1984, playing for California Golden Bears, coached by the future USA Eagles coach Jack Clark, where he won three national titles in five years. In 1989, after several tours around the world and playing for Old Belvedere RFC in Dublin, Ireland, Hein played for Oxford University, becoming, along with Don James, the first American rugby union players to play for Oxford since Pete Dawkins in 1961. With Oxford, Hein lost once and won once the annual Varsity Blues match against Cambridge

Hein was first capped for the USA Eagles against Tunisia, at Pebble Beach, on 3 May 1987. He also played the 1987 and 1991 World Cups. His last cap for the USA Eagles was during the match against Bermuda, at Hamilton, on March 12, 1994. In his international career, he earned 25 international caps and scored in aggregate 12 points and 3 tries in XVs, and 29 international caps representing the USA Eagles in Sevens, including as captain of his country's side in the 1993 Rugby Sevens World Cup in Edinburgh, Scotland.

Currently, he coaches Lamorinda Rugby's High School Varsity and JV teams.
