= Lopeti Oto =

Japan international rugby union player

- Born: November 2, 1971 (age 55) Tonga
- Height: 5 ft 9 in (175 cm)
- Weight: 202 lb (92 kg)
- School: Tonga College
- University: Daito Bunka University
- Notable relative(s): Nataniela Oto (brother), Teruyoshi Joshua Oto (Son)

Rugby union career
- Position: Wing
Amateur team(s)
| Years | Team | Apps | (Points) |
| 1988-1991 | Tonga College HS | | |
| 1991-1996 | Daito Bunka University | | |
Senior career
| Years | Team | Apps | (Points) |
| 1996-2003 | Toyota Motors | | |
International career
| Years | Team | Apps | (Points) |
| 1992-1997 | Japan | 8 | (35) |

Lopeti Oto (born 2 November 1971) is a Tongan-Japanese former rugby union player. He played as wing.

== Career ==
=== University rugby career ===
After graduating from Tonga College, Oto went to Daito Bunka University to study abroad and play rugby. While studying at Daito Bunka University, he contributed to his team's second place in the 1991 All-Japan Rugby University Championship and to its victory in the 1994 University Championship.

=== Company rugby career ===
In 1996, after graduating, Oto joined Toyota Motors, and played on the team which won the 1998 All-Japan Rugby Company Championship. Oto also contributed to Toyota's victory in the Rugby Company Championship in the 1998–99 season.

He retired after the 2003 season.

=== International career ===
Oto was first capped for Japan in the 1992 ARFU Asian Rugby Championship match against Hong Kong, at Seoul, on 26 September 1992.

Oto was also in the 1995 Rugby World Cup squad, earning 8 caps.

In 2000 he was named to the Japan President's XV squad to play Australia.

== Post rugby career ==
Currently, Oto teaches at Kasugaoka High School.

== Family ==
Oto's younger brother Nataniela Oto also acquired Japanese nationality to play for Japan in the 2007 Rugby World Cup and his other brother, Ofa Topeni, played for Toyota Industries Shuttles from 2009.
