= Ifereimi Tawake =

Fijian rugby union footballer and coach

- Born: 21 September 1962 (age 64) Sigatoka, Fiji
- Height: 6 ft 6 in (1.98 m)
- Weight: 220 lb (100 kg)

Rugby union career
- Position(s): Lock, Flanker
Senior career
Years	Team	Apps	(Points)
1986-1999	Nadroga		
International career
Years	Team	Apps	(Points)
1986-1999	Fiji	11	(0)
Coaching career
- Years: Team
- 2001-2002 (caretaker): Fiji
- 2004: Coastal Stallions
- 2005-2007: Western Crusaders
- 2007: Fiji Barbarians
- 2008: Northern Sharks
- 2008-2009: Fiji Warriors
- 2013: Sacramento Lions RFC

Ifereimi Tawake (born 21 September 1962 in Sigatoka) is a Fijian former rugby union footballer and coach of Sacramento Mountain Lions. He played as flanker and lock.

== Career ==
His first cap for Fiji was against Wales, at Suva, on 31 May 1986. Although having not taking part at the 1987 Rugby World Cup, he took part to the 1991 and 1999 World Cups, where in the former, he played 3 matches, while in the latter, he played 2 matches. He retired from the international career after the pool stage match against England at Twickenham on 20 October 1999.

== Coaching career ==
In 2001, he replaced Greg Smith as caretaker coach for the Flying Fijians until he was replaced in 2002 by Mac McCallion. He also coached clubs like Coastal Stallions, Western Crusaders, Northern Sharks, Fiji Barbarians, Fiji Warriors. From 2013 he coached the Sacramento Mountain Lions.

Sporting positions
Preceded by (Australia) Greg Smith	Fiji National Rugby Union Coach; 2001-2002 (caretaker)	Succeeded by (New Zealand) Mac McCallion
