= 1987 Rugby World Cup squads =

This article lists the official squads for the 1987 Rugby World Cup that took place in New Zealand and Australia from 22 May until 20 June 1987. The 1987 Rugby World Cup was the inaugural Rugby World Cup; the world championship for rugby union. Sixteen nations were invited to partake in the tournament, with the notable exception of South Africa; who were excluded from the tournament due to issues surrounding Apartheid.

Players marked (c) were named as captain for their national squad. All details, such as number of international caps and player age, are current as of the opening day of the tournament on 22 May 1987.

== Overview ==
Below is a table listing all the head coaches and captains for each nation.

Team	Coach	Captain
Argentina	(Argentina) Héctor Silva	Hugo Porta
Australia	(Australia) Alan Jones	Andrew Slack
Canada	(Canada) Gary Johnston	Hans de Goede
England	(England) Martin Green	Mike Harrison
France	(France) Jacques Fouroux	Daniel Dubroca
Fiji	(New Zealand) George Simpkin	Koli Rakoroi
Ireland	(Ireland) Syd Millar	Donal Lenihan
Italy	(Italy) Marco Bollesan	Marzio Innocenti
Japan	(Japan) Katsumi Miyaji	Toshiyuki Hayashi
New Zealand	(New Zealand) Brian Lochore	David Kirk
Romania	(Romania) Mihai Naca	Mircea Paraschiv
Scotland	(Scotland) Derrick Grant	Colin Deans
Tonga	(Tonga) Sione Kite	Fakahau Valu
United States	(New Zealand) Ron Mayes	Ed Burlingham
Wales	(Wales) Tony Gray	Richard Moriarty
Zimbabwe	(Zimbabwe) Brian Murphy	Malcolm Jellicoe

== Pool 1 ==
=== Australia ===
Head coach: (Australia) Alan Jones

Player	Position	Date of birth (age)	Caps	Club/province
Mark McBain	Hooker	31 October 1959 (aged 27)	4	(Australia) Brothers Old Boys / Queensland
Tom Lawton	Hooker	1 November 1962 (aged 24)	22	(Australia) Souths / Queensland
Enrique Rodríguez	Prop	20 June 1952 (aged 34)	15	(Australia) Warringah / New South Wales
Cameron Lillicrap	Prop	19 April 1963 (aged 24)	1	(Australia) Souths Rugby / Queensland
Mark Hartill	Prop	29 May 1964 (aged 22)	4	(Australia) Gordon / New South Wales
William Campbell	Lock	28 November 1961 (aged 25)	9	(Australia) Wests / Queensland
Steve Cutler	Lock	28 July 1960 (aged 26)	19	(Australia) Gordon RFC / New South Wales
David Codey	Flanker	7 July 1957 (aged 29)	8	(Australia) GPS / Queensland
Jeff Miller	Flanker	4 July 1962 (aged 24)	3	(Australia) Teachers-Norths / Queensland
Andy McIntyre	Flanker	23 December 1955 (aged 31)	22	(Australia) University of Queensland / Queensland
Simon Poidevin	Flanker	31 October 1958 (aged 28)	43	(Australia) Randwick / New South Wales
Ross Reynolds	Number 8	27 September 1958 (aged 28)	9	(Australia) Gordon / New South Wales
Steve Tuynman	Number 8	30 May 1963 (aged 23)	19	(Australia) Eastwood / New South Wales
Troy Coker	Number 8	30 May 1965 (aged 21)	0	(Australia) Souths / Queensland
Brian Smith	Scrum-half	9 September 1966 (aged 20)	14	(Australia) Wests/Queensland
Nick Farr-Jones	Scrum-half	18 April 1962 (aged 25)	17	(Australia) Sydney University / New South Wales
Michael Lynagh	Fly-half	25 October 1963 (aged 23)	16	(Australia) University of Queensland / Queensland
Steve James	Fly-half	23 July 1960 (aged 26)	1	(Australia) New South Wales
Brett Papworth	Centre	3 November 1963 (aged 23)	8	(Australia) Eastwood / New South Wales
Andrew Slack (c)	Centre	24 September 1955 (aged 31)	33	(Australia) Souths / Queensland
Michael Cook	Centre	23 April 1962 (aged 25)	2	(Australia) Terrace / Queensland
David Campese	Wing	21 October 1962 (aged 24)	27	(Australia) Randwick / New South Wales
Matt Burke	Wing	15 September 1964 (aged 22)	15	(Australia) Randwick / New South Wales
Peter Grigg	Wing	20 July 1958 (aged 28)	20	(Australia) Brothers / Queensland
Anthony Herbert	Fullback	13 August 1966 (aged 20)	1	(Australia) GPS Rugby / Queensland
Andrew Leeds	Fullback	19 September 1964 (aged 22)	1	(Australia) Parramatta / New South Wales
Roger Gould	Fullback	4 April 1957 (aged 30)	24	(Australia) Wests / Queensland

=== United States ===
Head coach: (Republic of Ireland) George Hook / (New Zealand) Ron Mayes

Player	Position	Date of birth (age)	Caps	Club/province
Pat Johnson	Hooker	17 March 1960 (aged 27)	1	(United States) Louisville Rugby Club
John Everett	Hooker	22 March 1957 (aged 30)	5	(United States) Old Blue R.F.C.
Fred Paoli	Prop	18 February 1954 (aged 33)	6	(United States) Denver Barbarians
Rick Bailey	Prop	25 June 1954 (aged 32)	9	(United States) Old Blue R.F.C.
Neal Brendel	Prop	12 September 1954 (aged 32)	5	(United States) Pittsburgh Rugby Club
Butch Horwath	Prop	1955 (aged 31–32)	4	(United States) Philadelphia Whitemarsh RFC
Kevin Swords	Lock	1 July 1960 (aged 26)	5	(United States) Boston RFC
Ed Burlingham (c)	Lock	14 October 1951 (aged 35)	12	(United States) Back Bay Rugby Club
Bob Causey	Lock	4 May 1953 (aged 34)	7	(United States) Louisiana State University RFC
Bill Shiflet	Lock	22 July 1954 (aged 32)	3	(United States) Lancer Rugby Club
Blane Warhurst	Flanker	28 September 1951 (aged 35)	8	(United States) Old Blue R.F.C.
Gary Lambert	Flanker	21 January 1959 (aged 28)	8	(United States) White Plains R.F.C.
Steve Finkel	Flanker	23 January 1953 (aged 34)	4	(United States) Scioto Valley R.F.C.
Tony Ridnell	Flanker	1 January 1961 (aged 26)	0	(United States) Old Puget Sound Beach
Brian Vizard	Number 8	4 June 1959 (aged 27)	4	(United States) OMBAC
Mike Saunders	Scrum-half	18 May 1959 (aged 28)	2	(United States) OMBAC
Dave Dickson	Scrum-half	29 November 1959 (aged 27)	1	(United States) Charlotte Rugby Club
John Mickel	Scrum-half	unknown	1	(United States) Los Angeles Rugby Club
Joe Clarkson	Fly-half	21 February 1957 (aged 30)	3	(United States) Los Angeles Rugby Club
Mike Caulder	Fly-half	15 August 1959 (aged 27)	2	(United States) Life Chiropractic College
Dave Horton	Fly-half	30 September 1960 (aged 26)	1	(United States) Boston RFC
Roy Helu	Centre	4 June 1953 (aged 33)	10	(United States) Old Blue R.F.C.
Tommy Vinick	Centre	8 November 1956 (aged 30)	1	(United States) Hartford Wanderers RFC
Kevin Higgins	Centre	8 November 1962 (aged 24)	6	(United States) OMBAC
Denis Shanagher	Centre	17 October 1956 (aged 30)	8	(United States) Bay Area Touring Side R.F.C.
Gary Hein	Wing	26 March 1953 (aged 34)	2	(United States) University of California
Mike Purcell	Wing	6 December 1951 (aged 35)	12	(United States) Bay Area Touring Side R.F.C.
Ray Nelson	Fullback	11 June 1961 (aged 25)	6	(Scotland) Hutchesons' GSFP

=== England ===
Head coach: (England) Martin Green

Player	Position	Date of birth (age)	Caps	Club/province
Brian Moore	Hooker	11 January 1962 (aged 25)	1	(England) Nottingham R.F.C.
Graham Dawe	Hooker	4 September 1959 (aged 27)	3	(England) Bath Rugby
Gary Pearce	Prop	2 March 1956 (aged 31)	31	(England) Northampton Saints
Jeff Probyn	Prop	27 April 1956 (aged 31)	0	(England) Wasps FC
Paul Rendall	Prop	18 February 1954 (aged 33)	7	(England) Wasps FC
Gareth Chilcott	Prop	20 November 1960 (aged 26)	5	(England) Bath Rugby
Nigel Redman	Lock	16 August 1964 (aged 22)	4	(England) Bath Rugby
Steve Bainbridge	Lock	7 October 1956 (aged 30)	18	(England) Fylde Rugby Club
Wade Dooley	Lock	2 October 1957 (aged 29)	12	(England) Fylde Rugby Club
Jon Hall	Flanker	15 March 1962 (aged 25)	19	(England) Bath Rugby
Peter Winterbottom	Flanker	31 May 1960 (aged 26)	26	(England) Headingley
Gary Rees	Flanker	2 May 1960 (aged 27)	7	(England) Nottingham R.F.C.
David Egerton	Number 8	19 October 1961 (aged 25)	0	(England) Bath Rugby
Dean Richards	Number 8	11 July 1963 (aged 23)	3	(England) Leicester Football Club
Richard Hill	Scrum-half	4 May 1961 (aged 26)	8	(England) Bath Rugby
Richard Harding	Scrum-half	29 August 1953 (aged 33)	4	(England) Bristol Rugby Club
Peter Williams	Fly-half	14 December 1958 (aged 28)	1	(England) Orrell R.U.F.C.
Huw Davies	Fly-half	18 February 1959 (aged 28)	1	(England) Wasps FC
Rob Andrew	Fly-half	18 February 1963 (aged 24)	12	(England) Wasps FC
Kevin Simms	Centre	25 December 1964 (aged 22)	10	(England) Wasps FC
Jamie Salmon	Centre	16 October 1959 (aged 27)	11	(England) Harlequin F.C.
Fran Clough	Centre	1 November 1962 (aged 24)	2	(England) Orrell R.U.F.C.
Mark Bailey	Wing	21 November 1960 (aged 26)	2	(England) Wasps FC
Rory Underwood	Wing	19 June 1963 (aged 23)	16	(England) R.A.F. / Leicester Football Club
Mike Harrison (c)	Wing	9 April 1956 (aged 31)	9	(England) Wakefield RFC
Jonathan Webb	Fullback	24 August 1963 (aged 23)	0	(England) Bristol Rugby Club
Marcus Rose	Fullback	12 January 1957 (aged 30)	9	(England) Harlequin F.C.

=== Japan ===
- Head coach: (Japan) Katsumi Miyaji
- Manager: (Japan) Shiggy Konno

Player	Position	Date of birth (age)	Caps	Club/province
Tsutomu Hirose	Hooker	24 July 1963 (aged 23)	0	(Japan) Doshisha University
Tsuyoshi Fujita	Hooker	27 January 1961 (aged 26)	19	(Japan) Nippon Steel Kamaishi
Koji Yasumi	Prop	13 July 1957 (aged 29)	1	(Japan) Toyota Motors
Koji Horaguchi	Prop	3 November 1953 (aged 33)	22	(Japan) Nippon Steel Kamaishi
Toshitaka Kimura	Prop	25 June 1963 (aged 23)	6	(Japan) World Fighting Bull
Masaharu Aizawa	Prop	12 May 1958 (aged 29)	6	(Japan) Ricoh
Atsushi Oyagi	Lock	15 August 1961 (aged 25)	12	(Japan) Kobe Steel Rugby Club
Seiji Kurihara	Lock	16 November 1964 (aged 22)	2	(Japan) Suntory Rugby Football Club
Yoshihiko Sakuraba	Lock	22 September 1966 (aged 20)	2	(Japan) Nippon Steel Kamaishi
Toshiyuki Hayashi (c)	Lock	8 February 1960 (aged 27)	22	(Japan) Kobe Steel Rugby Club
Katsufumi Miyamoto	Flanker	19 March 1966 (aged 21)	2	(Japan) Doshisha University
Yasuharu Kawase	Flanker	15 June 1959 (aged 27)	9	(Japan) Toshiba Fuchu Rugby Football Club
Sinali Latu	Number 8	22 August 1965 (aged 21)	0	(Japan) Sanyo
Michihito Chida	Number 8	22 December 1958 (aged 28)	24	(Japan) Nippon Steel Kamaishi
Hisataka Ikuta	Scrum-half	20 November 1962 (aged 24)	0	(Japan) Mitsubishi Heavy Industries Sagamigahara
Mitsutake Hagimoto	Scrum-half	10 February 1959 (aged 28)	0	(Japan) Kobe Steel Rugby Club
Seiji Hirao	Fly-half	21 January 1963 (aged 24)	12	(Japan) Kobe Steel Rugby Club
Katsuhiro Matsuo	Fly-half	6 January 1964 (aged 23)	5	(Japan) World Fighting Bull
Kojiro Yoshinaga	Centre	8 June 1961 (aged 25)	1	(Japan) Mazda Motor Corporation
Eiji Kutsuki	Centre	25 December 1962 (aged 24)	5	(Japan) Toyota Motors
Toshiro Yoshino	Wing	5 September 1960 (aged 26)	6	(Japan) Suntory Rugby Football Club
Nofomuli Taumoefolau	Wing	21 June 1956 (aged 30)	7	(Japan) Sanyo
Shinji Onuki	Wing	16 March 1962 (aged 25)	13	(Japan) Suntory Rugby Football Club
Minoru Okidoi	Wing	7 February 1965 (aged 22)	0	(Japan) Suntory Rugby Football Club
Shogo Mukai	Fullback	2 October 1961 (aged 25)	7	(Japan) Toshiba Fuchu Rugby Football Club
Daijiro Murai	Fullback	24 August 1962 (aged 24)	5	(Japan) Marubeni

== Pool 2 ==
=== Wales ===
Head coach: (Wales) Tony Gray

Player	Position	Date of birth (age)	Caps	Club/province
Billy James	Hooker	18 July 1956 (aged 30)	21	(Wales) Aberavon RFC
Alan Phillips	Hooker	21 August 1954 (aged 32)	15	(Wales) Cardiff RFC
Kevin Phillips	Hooker	15 June 1961 (aged 25)	1	(Wales) Neath RFC
Steve Blackmore	Prop	3 March 1962 (aged 25)	1	(Wales) Cardiff RFC
Stuart Evans	Prop	14 June 1963 (aged 23)	7	(Wales) Neath RFC
Anthony Buchanan	Prop	30 June 1955 (aged 31)	0	(Wales) Llanelli RFC
John Rawlins	Prop	7 June 1957 (aged 29)	0	(Wales) Newport RFC
Jeff Whitefoot	Prop	18 April 1956 (aged 31)	17	(Wales) Aberavon RFC
Dai Young	Prop	26 July 1967 (aged 19)	0	(Wales) Swansea RFC
Steve Sutton	Lock	17 February 1958 (aged 29)	6	South Wales Police RFC
Huw Richards	Lock	9 October 1960 (aged 26)	1	(Wales) Neath RFC
Bob Norster	Lock	23 June 1957 (aged 29)	24	(Wales) Cardiff RFC
Phil Davies	Lock	19 October 1963 (aged 23)	12	(Wales) Llanelli RFC
Paul Moriarty	Lock	16 July 1964 (aged 22)	9	(Wales) Swansea RFC
Richard Moriarty (c)	Lock	1 May 1957 (aged 30)	16	(Wales) Swansea RFC
Richard Webster	Flanker	9 July 1967 (aged 19)	0	(Wales) Swansea RFC
Richie Collins	Flanker	2 March 1962 (aged 25)	2	South Wales Police RFC
Gareth Roberts	Number 8	15 January 1959 (aged 28)	2	(Wales) Cardiff RFC
Ray Giles	Scrum-half	15 January 1961 (aged 26)	2	(Wales) Aberavon RFC
Robert Jones	Scrum-half	10 November 1965 (aged 21)	11	(Wales) Swansea RFC
Malcolm Dacey	Fly-half	12 July 1960 (aged 26)	14	(Wales) Swansea RFC
Jonathan Davies	Fly-half	24 October 1962 (aged 24)	13	(Wales) Neath RFC
Mark Ring	Centre	15 October 1962 (aged 24)	6	(Wales) Cardiff RFC
Bleddyn Bowen	Centre	16 July 1961 (aged 25)	13	South Wales Police RFC
Kevin Hopkins	Centre	29 September 1961 (aged 25)	4	(Wales) Swansea RFC
Mark Titley	Wing	3 May 1959 (aged 28)	13	(Wales) Bridgend RFC
Glen Webbe	Wing	21 January 1962 (aged 25)	5	(Wales) Bridgend RFC
John Devereux	Wing	30 March 1966 (aged 21)	11	(Wales) Bridgend RFC
Ieuan Evans	Wing	21 March 1964 (aged 23)	4	(Wales) Llanelli RFC
Adrian Hadley	Wing	1 March 1963 (aged 24)	16	(Wales) Cardiff RFC
Paul Thorburn	Fullback	24 November 1962 (aged 24)	8	(Wales) Neath RFC

=== Canada ===
Head coach: (Canada) Gary Johnston

Player	Position	Date of birth (age)	Caps	Club/province
Mark Cardinal	Hooker	5 May 1961 (aged 26)	2	(Canada) James Bay Athletic Association
Karl Svoboda	Hooker	23 March 1962 (aged 25)	5	(Canada) Ajax Wanderers R.U.F.C./British Columbia
Eddie Evans	Prop	15 September 1964 (aged 22)	2	(Canada) James Bay Athletic Association/British Columbia
Ross Breen	Prop	11 June 1956 (aged 30)	1	(Canada) Meraloma Rugby
Bill Handson	Prop	3 December 1954 (aged 32)	6	(Canada) Vaughan Yeomen R.F.C./British Columbia
Randy McKellar	Prop	6 January 1962 (aged 25)	3	(Canada) Crusaders Rugby Club/Ontario
Ro Hindson	Lock	23 May 1951 (aged 35)	28	(Canada) UBC Old Boys Ravens
Hans de Goede (c)	Lock	13 February 1953 (aged 34)	21	(Canada) James Bay Athletic Association/British Columbia
Ron van den Brink	Lock	30 September 1962 (aged 24)	1	(Canada) James Bay Athletic Association
Bruce Breen	Flanker	13 October 1961 (aged 25)	1	(Canada) Meraloma Rugby
Roy Radu	Flanker	11 September 1963 (aged 23)	3	(Canada) UBC Old Boys Ravens
Rob Frame	Flanker	30 September 1961 (aged 25)	2	(Canada) Castaway Wanderers RFC/British Columbia
Glen Ennis	Number 8	19 May 1964 (aged 23)	3	(Canada) James Bay Athletic Association/British Columbia
Dave Tucker	Scrum-half	30 March 1962 (aged 25)	5	(Canada) Meraloma Rugby/Alberta
Ian Hyde-Lay	Fly-half	31 January 1958 (aged 29)	2	(Canada) University of Victoria
Gareth Rees	Fly-half	30 June 1967 (aged 19)	2	(Canada) Castaway Wanderers RFC/British Columbia
Charles Jones	Centre	27 November 1963 (aged 23)	1	(Canada) Toronto Welsh
Ian Stuart	Centre	8 October 1961 (aged 25)	5	(Canada) Vancouver Rowing Club
Paul Vaesen	Centre	9 January 1959 (aged 28)	3	(Canada) James Bay Athletic Association
Steve Gray	Centre	19 July 1963 (aged 23)	2	(Canada) Vancouver Kats/Ontario
Tom Woods	Centre	29 October 1962 (aged 24)	4	(Canada) James Bay Athletic Association/British Columbia
Pat Palmer	Wing	6 November 1962 (aged 24)	5	(Canada) UBC Old Boys Ravens
John Lecky	Wing	15 February 1960 (aged 27)	11	(Canada) Meraloma Rugby/British Columbia
Spence McTavish	Wing	25 August 1948 (aged 38)	20	(Canada) UBC Old Boys Ravens/British Columbia
Mark Wyatt	Fullback	12 April 1961 (aged 26)	10	(Canada) James Bay Athletic Association/British Columbia

=== Ireland ===
- Prior to the tournament, Nigel Carr withdrew from the Ireland squad due to injury.

Head coaches: (Ireland) Mick Doyle (replaced by Syd Millar) / (Ireland) Jim Davidson

Player	Position	Date of birth (age)	Caps	Club/province
Steve Smith	Hooker	18 July 1959 (aged 27)	0	(Ireland) Ballymena R.F.C. / Ulster Rugby
Terry Kingston	Hooker	19 September 1963 (aged 23)	0	(Ireland) Munster Rugby
John MacDonald	Hooker	9 April 1960 (aged 27)	0	(Ireland) Malone RFC / Ulster Rugby
Des Fitzgerald	Prop	20 December 1957 (aged 29)	10	(Ireland) Lansdowne R.F.C. / Leinster Rugby
Job Langbroek	Prop	1 July 1957 (aged 29)	0	(Ireland) Blackrock College RFC / Leinster Rugby
J. J. McCoy	Prop	28 June 1958 (aged 28)	7	(Ireland) Dungannon RFC / Ulster Rugby
Philip Orr	Prop	14 December 1950 (aged 36)	55	(Ireland) Old Wesley RFC / Leinster Rugby
Willie Anderson	Lock	3 April 1955 (aged 32)	12	(Ireland) Dungannon RFC / Ulster Rugby
Neil Francis	Lock	17 March 1964 (aged 23)	0	(Ireland) Blackrock College RFC / Leinster Rugby
Donal Lenihan (c)	Lock	12 September 1959 (aged 27)	27	(Ireland) Cork Constitution / Munster Rugby
Jim Glennon	Lock	7 July 1953 (aged 33)	6	(Ireland) Skerries RFC/Leinster Rugby
Nigel Carr	Flanker	27 July 1959 (aged 27)	11	(Ireland) Ards RFC / Ulster Rugby
Paul Collins	Flanker	7 December 1959 (aged 27)	0	(Ireland) Lansdowne R.F.C. / Leinster Rugby
Derek McGrath	Flanker	3 May 1960 (aged 27)	1	(Ireland) Cork Constitution / Leinster Rugby
Phillip Matthews	Flanker	21 January 1960 (aged 27)	10	(Ireland) Ards RFC / Ulster Rugby
Brian Spillane	Number 8	26 January 1960 (aged 27)	9	(Ireland) Bohemians/Munster Rugby
Tony Doyle	Scrum-half	26 April 1958 (aged 29)	2	(Ireland) Greystones / Leinster Rugby
Michael Bradley	Scrum-half	17 November 1962 (aged 24)	14	(Ireland) Cork Constitution / Munster Rugby
Tony Ward	Fly-half	8 October 1954 (aged 32)	18	(Ireland) Greystones / Leinster Rugby
Paul Dean	Fly-half	28 June 1960 (aged 26)	19	(Ireland) St. Mary's College RFC / Leinster Rugby
Brendan Mullin	Centre	30 October 1963 (aged 23)	13	(Ireland) Blackrock College RFC / Leinster Rugby
Mike Kiernan	Centre	17 January 1961 (aged 26)	24	(Ireland) Dolphin RFC / Munster Rugby
David Irwin	Centre	1 February 1959 (aged 28)	19	(Ireland) Ulster Rugby
Keith Crossan	Wing	29 December 1959 (aged 27)	18	(Ireland) Instonians/Ulster Rugby
Trevor Ringland	Wing	13 November 1959 (aged 27)	27	(Ireland) Ballymena R.F.C. / Ulster Rugby
Hugo MacNeill	Fullback	16 September 1958 (aged 28)	33	(England) London Irish
Philip Rainey	Fullback	12 July 1959 (aged 27)	0	(Ireland) Ballymena R.F.C. / Ulster Rugby

=== Tonga ===
Head coach: (Tonga) Sione Kite Manager: (Tonga) : Mailefihi Tukuʻaho

Player	Position	Date of birth (age)	Caps	Club/province
Amone Afu	Hooker	circa 1957 (aged 29–30)	8	(Tonga) Police
Takai Makisi	Prop	circa 1962 (aged 24–25)	2	n/a
Latu Vaʻeno	Prop	circa 1959 (aged 27–28)	3	(Tonga) Haʻateiho
Viliami Lutua	Prop	circa 1956 (aged 30–31)	3	Tonga Police Force
Hakatoa Tupou	Prop	circa 1959 (aged 27–28)	6	(Tonga) Hihifo
Soakai Motuʻapuaka	Prop	circa 1953 (aged 33–34)	2	Tonga Police Force
Kasi Fine	Lock	20 March 1964 (aged 23)	0	(Tonga) Haʻateiho
Polutele Tuʻihalamaka	Lock	7 September 1949 (aged 37)	13	n/a
Mofuike Tuʻungafasi	Lock	circa 1963 (aged 23–24)	13	Tonga Defence Service/Hihifo
Fakahau Valu (c)	Flanker	1 July 1950 (aged 36)	22	(Tonga) Hihifo
Taipaleti Tuʻuta	Flanker	circa 1964 (aged 22–23)	0	(Tonga) Hihifo/Tongatapu
Sione Tahaafe	Number 8	8 July 1958 (aged 28)	0	(Australia) Eastwood Rugby Club
Maliu Filise	Number 8	circa 1958 (aged 28–29)	2	(Tonga) Haʻateiho
Kini Fotu	Number 8	circa 1965 (aged 21–22)	0	Tonga College
Manu Vunipola	Scrum-half	circa 1967 (aged 19–20)	0	(Tonga) Toa-ko-Maʻafu R.F.C./Kolomotuʻa
Talai Fifita	Scrum-half	24 July 1962 (aged 24)	6	(Tonga) Hihifo/Tongatapu
Taliaʻuli Liavaʻa	Fly-half	circa 1970 (aged 16–17)	0	(Tonga) Toloa Old Boys
Lemeki Vaipulu	Fly-half	circa 1961 (aged 25–26)	0	n/a
Asa Amone	Centre	8 January 1966 (aged 21)	0	Tonga Police Force
Samiu Mohi	Centre	circa 1962 (aged 24–25)	3	(Tonga) Hihifo
Alamoni Liavaʻa	Centre	circa 1959 (aged 27–28)	12	(Tonga) Hihifo
Talanoa Kitekeiʻaho	Wing	circa 1958 (aged 28–29)	1	(Tonga) Hihifo
Quddus Fielea	Wing	1 July 1967 (aged 19)	0	(Tonga) Haʻapai
Soane Asi	Wing	circa 1963 (aged 23–24)	0	(Tonga) St. Andrews Old Boys
Liueli Fusimalohi	Fullback	circa 1966 (aged 20–21)	0	(Tonga) ʻEua
Tali Eteʻaki	Fullback	circa 1963 (aged 23–24)	4	(Tonga) Hihifo/Tongatapu

== Pool 3 ==
=== New Zealand ===
Head coach: (New Zealand) Brian Lochore Assistant coaches : (New Zealand) Alex Wyllie and (New Zealand) John Hart

- Andy Dalton was ruled out of the tournament due to an injury in a practice session. As a result, David Kirk assumed the role of captain.

Note: Flags indicate national union for the club/province as defined by World Rugby.

Player	Position	Date of birth (age)	Caps	Club/province
Sean Fitzpatrick	Hooker	4 June 1963 (aged 23)	4	(New Zealand) Auckland
John Drake	Prop	22 January 1959 (aged 28)	2	(New Zealand) Auckland
Richard Loe	Prop	6 April 1960 (aged 27)	0	(New Zealand) Waikato
Steve McDowall	Prop	21 August 1961 (aged 25)	6	(New Zealand) Auckland
Murray Pierce	Lock	1 November 1957 (aged 29)	8	(New Zealand) Wellington
Gary Whetton	Lock	15 December 1959 (aged 27)	22	(New Zealand) Auckland
Albert Anderson	Lock	5 February 1961 (aged 26)	5	(New Zealand) Canterbury
Alan Whetton	Flanker	15 December 1959 (aged 27)	5	(New Zealand) Auckland
Andy Earl	Flanker	12 September 1961 (aged 25)	3	(New Zealand) Canterbury
Michael Jones	Flanker	8 April 1965 (aged 22)	1	(New Zealand) Auckland
Mark Brooke-Cowden	Flanker	12 June 1963 (aged 23)	2	(New Zealand) Auckland
Buck Shelford	Number 8	13 December 1957 (aged 29)	2	(New Zealand) North Harbour
Zinzan Brooke	Number 8	14 February 1965 (aged 22)	0	(New Zealand) Auckland
David Kirk (c)	Half-back	5 October 1960 (aged 26)	10	(New Zealand) Auckland
Bruce Deans	Half-back	25 November 1960 (aged 26)	0	(New Zealand) Canterbury
Grant Fox	First five-eighth	6 June 1962 (aged 24)	1	(New Zealand) Auckland
Frano Botica	First five-eighth	3 August 1963 (aged 23)	6	(New Zealand) North Harbour
Bernie McCahill	Centre	28 June 1964 (aged 22)	0	(New Zealand) Auckland
Joe Stanley	Centre	13 April 1957 (aged 30)	6	(New Zealand) Auckland
Warwick Taylor	Centre	11 March 1960 (aged 27)	16	(New Zealand) Canterbury
Craig Green	Wing	23 March 1961 (aged 26)	14	(New Zealand) Canterbury
John Kirwan	Wing	16 December 1964 (aged 22)	13	(New Zealand) Auckland
Terry Wright	Wing	21 March 1963 (aged 24)	2	(New Zealand) Auckland
John Gallagher	Fullback	29 January 1964 (aged 23)	0	(New Zealand) Wellington
Kieran Crowley	Fullback	31 August 1961 (aged 25)	8	(New Zealand) Taranaki

=== Fiji ===
Head coaches: (Fiji) Josateki Sovau and (New Zealand) George Simpkin

Player	Position	Date of birth (age)	Caps	Club/province
Rusiate Namoro	Hooker	circa 1966 (aged 21–22)	20	(Fiji) Suva
Salacieli Naivilawasa	Hooker	14 February 1961 (aged 26)	1	(Fiji) Suva
Epeli Rakai	Hooker	circa 1961 (aged 25–26)	15	(Fiji) Suva
Mosese Taga	Hooker	17 September 1964 (aged 22)	0	(Fiji) Suva
Sairusi Naituku	Prop	26 February 1961 (aged 26)	6	(Fiji) Rewa
Peni Volavola	Prop	6 June 1963 (aged 23)	5	(Fiji) Nadi
Aisake Nadolo	Lock	13 July 1964 (aged 22)	0	(Fiji) Suva
Ilaitia Savai	Lock	12 July 1960 (aged 26)	8	(Fiji) Nadroga
Jioji Cama	Lock		0	Fiji Police
Manasa Qoro	Flanker	8 February 1964 (aged 23)	0	(Fiji) Nadi
Samuela Vunivalu	Flanker	circa 1957 (aged 29–30)	0	(Fiji) Suva
Livai Kididromo	Flanker	circa 1959 (aged 27–28)	0	(Fiji) Suva
Apisai Nagata	Flanker		0	(Fiji) Nadi
Koli Rakoroi (c)	Number 8	1 July 1956 (aged 30)	15	(Fiji) Suva
John Sanday	Number 8	circa 1960 (aged 26–27)	0	(Fiji) Suva
Peceli Gale	Number 8	27 June 1957 (aged 29)	7	(Fiji) Nadi
Pauliasi Tabulutu	Scrum-half	15 July 1967 (aged 19)	3	(Fiji) Nabua
Paulo Nawalu	Scrum-half	18 October 1958 (aged 28)		(Fiji) Suva
Elia Rokowailoa	Fly-half	22 July 1958 (aged 28)	7	Fiji Army
Sirilo Lovokuro	Centre	circa 1965 (aged 21–22)	3	(Fiji) Suva
Epineri Naituku	Centre	8 January 1963 (aged 24)	0	(Fiji) Nasinu
Tom Mitchell	Centre	10 May 1958 (aged 29)	2	Fiji Army
Kaiava Salusalu	Centre	8 May 1957 (aged 30)	9	(Fiji) Suva
Serupepeli Tuvula	Wing	circa 1963 (aged 23–24)	4	(Australia) Teachers-Norths/Queensland
Tomasi Cama	Wing	21 February 1961 (aged 26)	4	(Fiji) Suva
Kavekini Nalaga	Wing	circa 1965 (aged 21–22)	1	(Fiji) Nadroga
Jimi Damu	Wing	15 July 1967 (aged 19)	3	(New Zealand) Grammar Carlton/Auckland
Severo Koroduadua	Fullback	22 December 1960 (aged 26)	10	(Fiji) Suva
Jone Kubu	Fullback	circa 1961 (aged 25–26)	5	(Fiji) Rewa

=== Italy ===
Head coach: (Italy) Marco Bollesan

Note: Flags indicate national union for the club/province as defined by World Rugby.

Player	Position	Date of birth (age)	Caps	Club/province
Antonio Galeazzo	Hooker	15 February 1959 (aged 28)	3	(Italy) Petrarca
Giorgio Morelli	Hooker	18 April 1954 (aged 33)	25	(Italy) L'Aquila
Giancarlo Cucchiella	Prop	18 February 1953 (aged 34)	21	(Italy) L'Aquila
Giancarlo Pivetta	Prop	18 June 1957 (aged 29)	29	(Italy) San Donà
Tito Lupini	Prop	12 November 1955 (aged 31)	1	(Italy) Rovigo
Stefano Romagnoli	Prop	5 February 1955 (aged 32)	14	(Italy) Parma
Guido Rossi	Prop	18 April 1959 (aged 28)	29	(Italy) Benetton Treviso
Mauro Gardin	Lock	27 March 1961 (aged 26)	19	(Italy) Petrarca
Franco Berni	Lock	9 January 1965 (aged 22)	7	(Italy) A.S. Milano
Antonio Colella	Lock	4 September 1961 (aged 25)	30	(Italy) L'Aquila
Giuseppe Artuso	Flanker	14 November 1956 (aged 30)	30	(Italy) Petrarca
Raffaele Dolfato	Flanker	28 October 1962 (aged 24)	3	(Italy) Benetton Treviso
Piergianni Farina	Flanker	1 June 1959 (aged 27)	1	(Italy) Petrarca
Mario Pavin	Flanker	18 July 1958 (aged 28)	7	(Italy) Benetton Treviso
Gianni Zanon	Flanker	3 March 1960 (aged 27)	31	(Italy) Benetton Treviso
Marzio Innocenti (c)	Number 8	4 September 1958 (aged 28)	34	(Italy) Petrarca
Alessandro Ghini	Scrum-half	4 May 1961 (aged 26)	33	(Italy) Milano
Fulvio Lorigiola	Scrum-half	6 January 1959 (aged 28)	31	(Italy) Petrarca
Rodolfo Ambrosio	Fly-half	27 December 1961 (aged 25)	0	(Argentina) Tala
Oscar Collodo	Fly-half	16 August 1958 (aged 28)	12	(Italy) Benetton Treviso
Stefano Barba	Centre	10 January 1964 (aged 23)	7	(Italy) CUS Roma
Fabio Gaetaniello	Centre	25 August 1958 (aged 28)	16	(Italy) Parma
Sergio Zorzi	Centre	21 April 1964 (aged 23)	3	(Italy) Benetton Treviso
Marcello Cuttitta	Wing	2 September 1966 (aged 20)	3	(Italy) L'Aquila
Massimo Mascioletti	Wing	4 March 1958 (aged 29)	46	(Italy) L'Aquila
Serafino Ghizzoni	Fullback	16 October 1954 (aged 32)	59	(Italy) L'Aquila
Daniele Tebaldi	Fullback	24 April 1961 (aged 26)	3	(Italy) Parma

=== Argentina ===
Head coaches: (Argentina) Héctor Silva / (Argentina) Ángel Guastella

Before the match against New Zealand, Martín Yangüela withdrew due to an injury and was replaced by Marcelo Faggi.

Note: Flags indicate national union for the club/province as defined by World Rugby.

Player	Position	Date of birth (age)	Caps	Club/province
Julio Clement	Hooker	1 July 1962 (aged 24)	0	(Argentina) Universitario
Serafín Dengra	Hooker	21 September 1961 (aged 25)	9	(Argentina) San Martín
Hugo Torres	Prop	24 April 1962 (aged 25)	0	(Argentina) Tala
Diego Cash	Prop	10 August 1961 (aged 25)	13	(Argentina) San Isidro
Luis Molina	Prop	3 November 1959 (aged 27)	2	(Argentina) Los Tarcos
Fernando Morel	Prop	1 July 1958 (aged 28)	22	(Argentina) CASI
Gustavo Milano	Lock	11 February 1961 (aged 26)	20	(Argentina) Jockey Club
Roberto Cobelo	Lock	31 October 1962 (aged 24)	0	(Argentina) CASI
Eliseo Branca	Lock	20 July 1957 (aged 29)	24	(Argentina) CASI
Sergio Carossio	Lock	29 October 1962 (aged 24)	1	(Argentina) Olivos
Jorge Allen	Flanker	12 July 1956 (aged 30)	11	(Argentina) CASI
José Mostany	Flanker	13 January 1963 (aged 24)	1	(Argentina) Manuel Belgrano
Alejandro Schiavio	Flanker	28 January 1961 (aged 26)	3	(Argentina) Pueyrredón
Gabriel Travaglini	Number 8	1 July 1958 (aged 28)	16	(Argentina) CASI
Marcelo Faggi	Scrum-half	13 October 1964 (aged 22)	0	(Argentina) Estudiantes de Paraná
Fabio Gómez	Scrum-half	13 July 1965 (aged 21)	2	(Argentina) Banco Nación
Martín Yangüela	Scrum-half	1 April 1957 (aged 30)	0	(Argentina) Pueyrredón
Julián Manuele	Fly-half	30 October 1966 (aged 20)	0	(Argentina) La Plata
Hugo Porta (c)	Fly-half	11 September 1951 (aged 35)	48	(Argentina) Banco Nación
Rafael Madero	Centre	6 July 1958 (aged 28)	22	(Argentina) San Isidro
Fabián Turnes	Centre	12 January 1965 (aged 22)	10	(Argentina) Banco Nación
Marcelo Campo	Wing	1 July 1957 (aged 29)	18	(Argentina) Pueyrredón
Diego Cuesta Silva	Wing	23 January 1963 (aged 24)	13	(Argentina) San Isidro
Juan Lanza	Wing	7 June 1963 (aged 23)	10	(Argentina) CUBA
Pedro Lanza	Wing	21 September 1961 (aged 25)	14	(Argentina) CUBA
Guillermo Angaut	Fullback	10 January 1965 (aged 22)	0	(Argentina) La Plata
Sebastián Salvat	Fullback	5 April 1967 (aged 20)	1	(Argentina) Alumni

== Pool 4 ==
=== France ===
Head coach: (France) Jacques Fouroux

Player	Position	Date of birth (age)	Caps	Club/province
Philippe Dintrans	Hooker	29 January 1957 (aged 30)	42	Stadoceste Tarbais
Daniel Dubroca (c)	Hooker	25 April 1954 (aged 33)	23	SU Agen
Jean-Pierre Garuet-Lempirou	Prop	15 June 1953 (aged 33)	26	FC Lourdes
Pascal Ondarts	Prop	1 April 1956 (aged 31)	5	Biarritz Olympique
Jean-Louis Tolot	Prop	13 June 1957 (aged 29)	0	SU Agen
Louis Armary	Prop	24 July 1963 (aged 23)	0	FC Lourdes
Francis Haget	Lock	1 October 1949 (aged 37)	38	Biarritz Olympique
Jean Condom	Lock	15 August 1960 (aged 26)	36	Biarritz Olympique
Alain Lorieux	Lock	26 June 1956 (aged 30)	17	FC Grenoble
Dominique Erbani	Flanker	16 August 1956 (aged 30)	31	SU Agen
Jean-Luc Joinel	Flanker	21 September 1953 (aged 33)	50	CA Brive
Éric Champ	Flanker	8 June 1962 (aged 24)	17	RC Toulonnais
Laurent Rodriguez	Number 8	25 June 1960 (aged 26)	29	AS Montferrand
Pierre Berbizier	Scrum-half	17 June 1958 (aged 28)	30	SU Agen
Rodolphe Modin	Scrum-half	26 March 1959 (aged 28)	0	CA Brive
Guy Laporte	Fly-half	15 December 1952 (aged 34)	13	SC Graulhet
Didier Camberabero	Fly-half	9 January 1961 (aged 26)	5	AS Béziers Hérault
Alain Carminati	Fly-half	17 August 1966 (aged 20)	2	AS Béziers Hérault
Éric Bonneval	Centre	12 November 1963 (aged 23)	16	Stade Toulousain
Denis Charvet	Centre	12 May 1962 (aged 25)	5	Stade Toulousain
Philippe Sella	Centre	14 February 1962 (aged 25)	39	SU Agen
Franck Mesnel	Centre	30 June 1961 (aged 25)	6	Racing Club de France
Patrick Estève	Wing	14 February 1959 (aged 28)	23	RC Narbonne
Jean-Baptiste Lafond	Wing	20 December 1961 (aged 25)	9	Racing Club de France
Patrice Lagisquet	Wing	4 September 1962 (aged 24)	12	Aviron Bayonnais
Marc Andrieu	Wing	19 September 1959 (aged 27)	4	RC Nîmes
Serge Blanco	Fullback	31 August 1958 (aged 28)	43	Biarritz Olympique

=== Scotland ===
Head coach: (Scotland) Derrick Grant

Player	Position	Date of birth (age)	Caps	Club/province
Colin Deans (c)	Hooker	3 May 1955 (aged 32)	48	(Scotland) Hawick RFC
Gary Callander	Hooker	5 July 1959 (aged 27)	1	(Scotland) Hawick RFC
Norrie Rowan	Prop	17 September 1951 (aged 35)	8	(Scotland) Forrester RFC
Alex Brewster	Prop	3 May 1954 (aged 33)	6	(Scotland) Stewart's Melville RFC
David Sole	Prop	8 May 1962 (aged 25)	6	(Scotland) Edinburgh Academical Football Club
Iain Milne	Prop	17 June 1956 (aged 30)	36	(Scotland) Heriot's Rugby Club
Alan Tomes	Lock	6 November 1951 (aged 35)	44	(Scotland) Hawick RFC
Jeremy Campbell-Lamerton	Lock	21 February 1959 (aged 28)	1	(England) Army Rugby Union
Finlay Calder	Flanker	20 August 1957 (aged 29)	9	(Scotland) Heriot's Rugby Club
John Jeffrey	Flanker	25 March 1959 (aged 28)	12	(Scotland) Kelso RFC
Derek Turnbull	Flanker	2 October 1961 (aged 25)	0	(Scotland) Hawick RFC
Iain Paxton	Number 8	29 December 1957 (aged 29)	33	(Scotland) Glenrothes RFC
Derek White	Number 8	30 January 1958 (aged 29)	6	(Scotland) Gala RFC
Roy Laidlaw	Scrum-half	5 October 1953 (aged 33)	44	(Scotland) Jed-Forest RFC
Greig Oliver	Scrum-half	12 September 1964 (aged 22)	0	(Scotland) Hawick RFC
John Rutherford	Fly-half	4 October 1955 (aged 31)	42	(Scotland) Selkirk RFC
Richard Cramb	Fly-half	7 September 1963 (aged 23)	0	(England) Newcastle Gosforth
Keith Robertson	Centre	5 December 1954 (aged 32)	36	(Scotland) Melrose RFC
Scott Hastings	Centre	4 December 1964 (aged 22)	8	(Scotland) Watsonian RFC
Alan Tait	Centre	2 November 1964 (aged 22)	0	(Scotland) Kelso RFC
Iwan Tukalo	Wing	5 March 1961 (aged 26)	5	(Scotland) Heriot's Rugby Club
Matt Duncan	Wing	29 August 1959 (aged 27)	8	West of Scotland F.C.
Douglas Wyllie	Wing	20 May 1963 (aged 24)	5	(Scotland) Selkirk RFC
Gavin Hastings	Fullback	3 January 1962 (aged 25)	9	(Scotland) Watsonian RFC
Peter Dods	Fullback	6 January 1958 (aged 29)	16	(Scotland) Gala RFC

=== Romania ===
Head coach: (Romania) Mihai Naca

Player	Position	Date of birth (age)	Caps	Club/province
Vasile Ilcă	Hooker	circa 1960	0	(Romania) CS Universitatea Cluj-Napoca
Emilian Grigore	Hooker	circa 1957	6	(Romania) RCJ Farul Constanța
Ion Bucan	Prop	27 January 1955 (aged 32)	44	(Romania) CS Dinamo București
Florea Opriș	Prop	10 March 1956 (aged 31)	6	(Romania) RCJ Farul Constanța
Gheorghe Leonte	Prop	12 February 1963 (aged 24)	7	(Romania) CSA Steaua București
Vasile Pașcu	Prop	8 February 1959 (aged 28)	12	(Romania) RC Grivița
Gheorghe Dumitru	Lock	31 January 1952 (aged 35)	65	(Romania) RCJ Farul Constanța
Nicolae Vereș	Lock	1 July 1963 (aged 23)	2	(Romania) CS Dinamo București
Cristian Raducanu	Lock	2 October 1967 (aged 19)	3	(Romania) CS Dinamo București
Laurențiu Constantin	Lock	12 July 1963 (aged 23)	21	(Romania) CSA Steaua București
Haralambie Dumitraș	Flanker	11 February 1960 (aged 27)	9	(Romania) Contactoare Buzău
Florică Murariu	Flanker	25 March 1955 (aged 32)	54	(Romania) CSA Steaua București
Emilian Necula	Number 8	24 May 1960 (aged 26)	0	(Romania) RCJ Farul Constanța
Ștefan Constantin	Number 8	5 June 1959 (aged 27)	14	(Romania) RCJ Farul Constanța
Mircea Paraschiv (c)	Scrum-half	14 December 1954 (aged 32)	58	(Romania) CSA Steaua București
Teodor Coman	Scrum-half	1 July 1962 (aged 24)	5	(Romania) CSA Steaua București
Alexandru Dumitru	Fly-half	22 August 1953 (aged 33)	42	(Romania) CSA Steaua București
Romeo Bezușcu	Fly-half	1 July 1964 (aged 22)	1	(Romania) RCJ Farul Constanța
Adrian Lungu	Centre	9 May 1960 (aged 27)	42	(Romania) CS Dinamo București
Ștefan Tofan	Centre	25 February 1965 (aged 22)	8	(Romania) CS Dinamo București
Adrian Tinca	Centre	9 January 1967 (aged 20)	0	(Romania) RCJ Farul Constanța
Vasile David	Centre	11 April 1961 (aged 26)	6	(Romania) CSA Steaua București
Marcel Toader	Wing	4 January 1963 (aged 24)	15	(Romania) CSA Steaua București
Adrian Pllotschi	Wing	26 October 1959 (aged 27)	2	(Romania) CSA Steaua București
Liviu Hodorcă	Wing	1 July 1961 (aged 25)	9	(Romania) RCJ Farul Constanța
Alexandru Marin	Fullback	28 September 1957 (aged 29)	12	(Romania) RC Grivița
Vasile Ion	Fullback	1 January 1956 (aged 31)	16	(Romania) RCJ Farul Constanța

=== Zimbabwe ===
Head coach: (Zimbabwe) Brian Murphy

Player	Position	Date of birth (age)	Caps	Club/province
Keith Bell	Hooker	10 December 1958 (aged 28)	1	n/a
Lance Bray	Hooker	circa 1960	6	n/a
Alex Nicholls	Prop	4 August 1958 (aged 28)	9	(Zimbabwe) Mashonaland
Andy Tucker	Prop	11 March 1960 (aged 27)	7	n/a
George Elcombe	Prop	7 October 1959 (aged 27)	2	n/a
Michael Martin	Lock	25 December 1959 (aged 27)	9	n/a
Malcolm Sawyer	Lock	circa 1960	3	n/a
Neville Kloppers	Lock	circa 1962	3	(Zimbabwe) Old Johnians RFC/Mashonaland
Grant Davidson	Lock	15 January 1963 (aged 24)	2	n/a
Errol Bredenkamp	Flanker	circa 1961	0	n/a
Rod Gray	Flanker	circa 1961	5	n/a
Dirk Buitendag	Flanker	6 April 1960 (aged 27)	3	(Zimbabwe) Mashonaland
Mark Neill	Number 8	circa 1965	3	n/a
Malcolm Jellicoe (c)	Scrum-half	29 May 1963 (aged 23)	3	(Zimbabwe) Mashonaland
Craig Brown	Fly-half	1 February 1968 (aged 19)	15	n/a
Marthinus Grobler	Fly-half	circa 1967	3	(England) Moseley RFC'
Richard Tsimba	Centre	9 July 1965 (aged 21)	11	(Zimbabwe) Chaminuka R.F.C.
Campbell Graham	Centre	circa 1963	0	n/a
Andre Buitendag	Centre	26 February 1962 (aged 25)	3	(Zimbabwe) Mashonaland
Peter Kaulback	Wing	26 October 1963 (aged 23)	2	n/a
Eric Barrett	Wing	15 June 1951 (aged 35)	3	(Zimbabwe) Old Hararians
Shawn Graham	Wing	circa 1961	1	n/a
Andy Ferreira	Fullback	26 June 1961 (aged 25)	16	(Zimbabwe) Old Georgians RFC/Mashonaland
Kenyon Ziehl	Fullback	11 January 1963 (aged 24)	12	n/a
