= 1978 Argentina rugby union tour of Britain, Ireland and Italy =

- Coach: Ángel Guastella
- Tour captain: Hugo Porta
Summary
P	W	D	L
Total
8	5	1	3
Test match
2	0	1	1
Opponent
P	W	D	L
England
1	0	1	0
Italy
1	0	0	1

The 1978 Argentina rugby union tour of Britain, Ireland and Italy was a series of nine matches played by the Argentina national rugby union team in September and October 1978.

Six of the nine matches were played in England, with the tourists going on to play one match each in Wales, Ireland and Italy. The tour featured the first ever test match between Argentina and Italy.

Argentina won five matches, lost three and drew one. The draw came against England, although England did not award full international caps for the fixture.

The tour captain, Hugo Porta, played all nine games, scored 94 of the team's 157 points on tour and, according to Rothmans Rugby Yearbook, "established himself as one of the world's great players" on the tour.

== Touring squad ==
Team Manager: Ángel Guastella

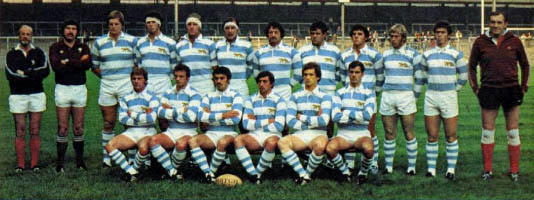
The squad that played England at Twickenham

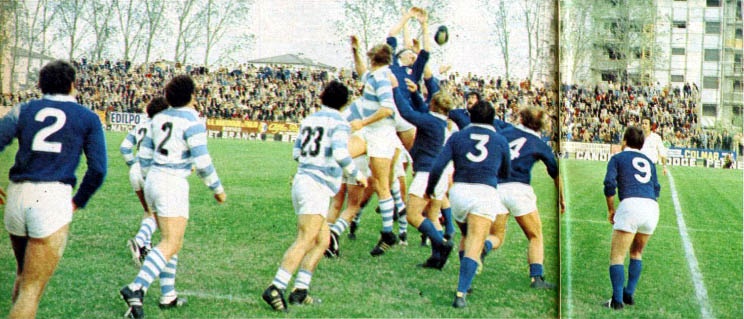
The test v Italy

Full back

- Martín Sansot (Pueyrredón – Buenos Aires)

Three-quarters

- Marcelo Campo (Old Georgian)
- Adolfo Cappelletti (Banco Nación)
- Marcelo Loffreda (San Isidro Club)
- Rafael Madero (San Isidro Club)
- Alejandro Puccio (C.A. San Isidro)
- Javier Trucco (Universitario B.A.)
- Eduardo Sanguinetti (Universitario B.A.)

Half-backs

- Alejandro Cerioni (Pueyrredón)
- Alejandro Cubelli (Belgrano A.C.)
- Javier Escalante (Duendes
- Tomás Landajo (Pueyrredón)
- Hugo Porta (Banco Nación)
- Alfredo Soares Gache (San Isidro Club)

Forwards

- Alejandro Iachetti (Hindú)
- Hugo Nicola (Curupaytí)
- Ricardo Passaglia (La Tablada)
- Guillermo Paz (Alumni)
- Tomás Petersen (San Isidro Club)
- Topo Rodriguez (Tala)
- Ronaldo Seaton (Atlético del Rosario)
- Carlos Serrano (Hindú)
- Héctor Silva (Los Tilos)
- Gabriel Travaglini (C.A. San Isidro)
- Rodolfo Ventura (Newman)

== The matches ==
Complete list of matches played by Argentina:

=== Southern Counties ===
27 September

Southern Counties	9–39	Argentina
Pen: I. Gale (3)		Try: Porta, Cappelletti, Cerioni; Madero, Puccio, Petersen; Con: Porta (3); Pen: Porta (3)

Iffley Road, Oxford
Referee: Jean Pierre Bonnet (France)

Southern Counties: I.Gale. Clive Rees, B.Reynolds, D.Course-, R.Ellis Jones; J.Wright e I.George; G.Sharpe, R.Jackson, J.Coock, J.Mawle, John Orwin, Paul Rendall, A.Jenkins, Gary Pearce.
Argentina: M.Sansot; A.Puccio, R.Madero, M.Loffreda, A.Cappelletti; H.Porta (capt.), R.Landajo; C.Serreno, H.Silva, T.Petersen; A.Iachetti, G.Travaglini; H.Nicola; R..Seaton, A.Cerioni.

=== London Division ===
30 September

London Division	22–15	Argentina
Try: Ripley, French, Preston; Con: Bushell 2 Pen: Bushell 2		Try: Madero; Con: Porta; Pen: Porta; Drop: Porta, Sansot

Twickenham, London
Referee: Corris Thomas (Wales)

London Division: K.M.Bushell; R.O.Demming; N.R.French, Clive Woodward, Derek Wyatt; Nick Preston, M.R.Conner; T.C.Claston, P.d'A.Keith-Roach (capt.) A.J.Cutter, Neil Mantell, Maurice Colclough, A.C.Alexander, Bob Mordell, Andy Ripley.
Argentina: M.Sansot; A.Puccio, M.Loffreda, R.Madero, A.Cappelletti; H.Porta (capt.), R.Landajo; H.Silva, T.Pe¬tersen, G.Paz; G.Travaglini, A.Iachetti; H.Nicola, A.Cubelli, A.Cerioni.

=== Northern Division ===
4 October

North of England	20–6	Argentina
Try: Slemen, Boyd, Horton, Penalty try Con: Young; Pen: Boyd 2		Pen: Sansot; Drop: Sansot

Bridge Road, Headingley
Referee: A. Bryce (Scotland)

North of England: D.Boyd; Peter Squires, Tony Bond, W.Lyon, Mike Slemen; John Horton, Malcolm Young; Fran Cotton; K.Pacey, J.Bell, Bill Beaumont (capt.), J.Buttler, Peter Dixon, P.Moss, K.Higgins.
Argentina: M.Sansot; M.Campo, J.Trueco, R.Madero, A.Cappelletti; H.Porta (capt.), R.Landajo; T.Petersen, C.Serrano, H.Silva; A.Iachetti, R.Passaglia; H.Nicola, R.Sea¬ton, E.Rodríguez.

=== North Midlands ===
7 October

North Midlands	14–22	Argentina

The Reddings, Moseley
Referee: David Burnett (Ireland)

North Midlands: P.J.Mumford.C.Perry, A.Watson-Jones, M.K.Swain, M.A.Hall; Les Cusworth, P.C.Bullock; T.F.Corless, G.N.J.Cox, J.J.Moore, B.Aire, N.J.Bekewell, J.C.White, T.Clarke, D.Nutt.
Argentina: M.Sansot; M.Campo, M.Lofreda, R.Madero, A.Cappelletti; H.Porta (capt.), A.Soares Gache; G.Paz, C.Serrano, G.Travaglini; R.Passaglia, A.Iachetti; H.Nicola, R.Seaton, A.Cerioni.

=== The English Students ===
10 October

English Students	9–15	Argentina
Try: I. Wilkins; Con: Rose; Pen: Rose		Try: Porta; Con: Porta; Pen: Porta 3

Kingsholm, Gloucester
Referee: Norman Sanson (Scotland)

English Students: Marcus Rose; J.Basnett, A.Harrower, Clive Woodward, P.Asquith; 1.Wilkins, M.Conner; S.Wilkes, M.Howe, J.Doubleday, Paul Ackford, Steve Bainbridge, Toby Allchurch, Nick Jeavons, Peter Polledri.
Argentina: E.Sanguinetti; M.Campo, J.Escalante, R.Madero, A.Cappelletti; H.Porta (capt.), R.Landajo; G.Paz, G.Travaglini, H.Silva; R.Passaglia, A.Iachetti; H.Nicola, A.Cubelli, A.Cerioni.

=== England ===
14 October

England	13–13	Argentina
Try: Gifford, Squires; Con: Bushell; Drop: Horton		Try: Campo, Passaglia; Con: Porta; Pen: Porta

Twickenham, London
Referee: Clive Norling (Wales)

England: 15. Kevin Bushell, 14.Peter Squires, 13. Peter Warfield, 12.Paul Dodge, 11.Mike Slemen, 10.John Horton, 9.Chris Gifford, 1.Barry Nelmes, 2.Peter Wheeler, 3.Fran Cotton, 4.Bill Beaumont, 5.Maurice Colclough, 6.Peter Dixon, 7.Mike Rafter, 8.John Scott Argentina: 15.Martin Sansot, 14.Marcelo Campo, 13.Marcelo Loffreda, 12.Rafael Madero, 11.Adolfo Cappelletti, 10.Hugo Porta(c), 9.Tomas Landajo, 8.Gabriel Travaglini, 6.Héctor Silva, 7.Tomas Petersen, 5.Alejandro Iachetti, 4.Ricardo Passaglia, 3.Alejandro Cerioni, 2.Alejandro Cubelli, 1.Hugo Nicola

=== Wales "B" ===
17 October

Wales B	14–17	Argentina
Try: Lewis, Hutchings; Pen: Barry 2		Try: Campo, Serrano; Pen: Porta, Sansot; Drop: Porta

Stradey Park, Llanelli
Referee: Roger Quittenton (England)

Wales "B": I.Walsh; Elgan Rees, N.Hutchings, Peter Morgan, R.Ellis¬Jones; D.Barry, Gerald Williams; D.Jones, G.Davies, D.Lewis, Richard Moriarty, Steve Sutton, Gareth Williams, Ch.Seldon, Paul Ringer.
Argentina: M.Sansot; M.Campo, M.Loffreda, R.Madero, A.Cappelletti; H.Porta (capt.), A.Soares Gache; T.Peter¬sen, C.Serrano, G, Travaglini; R.Passaglia, A.lachetti; H.Nicola, A.Cubelli, A.Cerioni.

=== Leinster ===
21 October

Leinster	13–24	Argentina
Try: Andrucetti; Pen: Quinn 3		Try: Travaglini; Con: Porta; Pen: Porta 4 Sansot; Drop: Porta

Lansdowne Road, Dublin
Referee: Laurie Prideaux (England)

Leinster: F.Ennis; Terry Kennedy, P.Andrucetti, Paul McNaughton, Freddie McLennan; M.Quinn, John Moloney (capt.); Phil Orr, John Cantrell, M.Fitzpatrick, Willie Duggan, E.O'Raffertty, Fergus Slattery, Shay Deering, Mike Gibson.
Argentina: M.Sansot; M.Campo, J.Trucco, R.Madero, A.Cappelletti; H.Porta (capt.), Landajo; H.Silva, T.Petersen, G.Travaglini; R.Passaglia, A.lachetti; H.Nicola, A.Cubelli, A.Cerioni.

=== Italy ===
24 October

Italy	19–6	Argentina
Try: R Francescato, Ghizzoni; Con: Zuin; Pen: Zuin 2 Drop: Zuin		Pen: Porta; Drop: Porta

Mario Battaglini, Rovigo
Referee: Sergio Tavelli (Italy)

Italy: 15.Rocco Caligiuri, 14.Massimo Mascioletti, 13.Nello Francescato, 12.Rino Francescato, 11.Serafino Ghizzoni, 10.Loredano Zuin, 9.Angelo Visentin, 8.Elio de Anna, 7.Fiorenzo Blessano, 6.Paolo Mariani, 5.Adriano Fedrigo, 4.Fulvio di Carlo, 3.Ambrogio Bona (capT.), 2.Claudio Robazza, 1.Anacleto Altigieri – Replacement: Narciso Zanella
Argentina 15.Eduardo Sanguinetti, 14.Martín Sansot, 13.Javier Escalante, 12.Rafael Madero, 11.Marcelo Campo, 10.Hugo Porta (cap), 9.Alfredo Soares Gache, 8.Gabriel Travaglini, 7.Tomás Petersen, 6.Carlos Serrano, 5.Ricardo Passaglia, 4.Alejandro Iachetti, 3.Alejandro Cerioni, 2.Alejandro Cubelli, 1.Rodolfo Ventura – Replacement: Adolfo Cappelletti, Hugo Nicola

== Bibliography ==
- Vivian Jenkins, ed. (1979). Rothmans Rugby Yearbook 1979–80. Queen Anne Press. pp. 47–51. ISBN 0-354-09087-9.
