= Ireland's Call =

National song at some sporting events

Ireland's Call - Rugby World Cup 2011
Ireland's Call performed in Rugby World Cup 2011.

"Ireland's Call" is a song by Phil Coulter used as a national anthem by some sports competitors representing the island of Ireland, originally the Ireland men's rugby union team.

It was commissioned by the Irish Rugby Football Union (IRFU) for the 1995 World Cup, because a substantial minority, around 20%, of the IRFU's members are from Northern Ireland and the use of the anthem of the Republic of Ireland ("Amhrán na bhFiann") was considered inappropriate.

While some all-island sports governing bodies use "Amhrán na bhFiann" in international competition (for example, the Irish Athletic Boxing Association) others do not, and many have followed the IRFU in using "Ireland's Call", including Hockey Ireland, the Irish Cricket Union, Rugby League Ireland and Irish Korfball Association. The song has attracted some opposition, both on musical grounds and from Irish nationalists who would prefer "Amhrán na bhFiann". Journalist Malachy Clerkin wrote on its 20th anniversary, "It has run the gamut with a sceptical and often hostile public, from deep loathing to grudging acceptance to growing pockets of reasonably throated support."

== Rugby history ==
From the Partition of Ireland until the 1930s, no flag or anthem was used at Ireland rugby internationals. After objections from clubs in the then Irish Free State, a compromise was agreed to use an IRFU flag, with "Amhrán na bhFiann" at matches in the Free State, "God Save the King" at those in Northern Ireland, and no anthem at away matches. Ulster unionist players are not expected to sing "Amhrán na bhFiann". There were no senior internationals played in Northern Ireland from 1954 to 2007. Des Fitzgerald declined to play a 1982 B international in Belfast as "God Save the Queen" would be played. Before a 1954 Five Nations match in Ravenhill, Belfast, players from the Republic refused to take the field until after "God Save the Queen" had finished. Cahir Healy negotiated a compromise whereby the Royal Salute was played instead of the full anthem, and promised that future internationals would be played in Dublin. The incident was hushed up. Playing all matches at Lansdowne Road suited the IRFU in any case, since gate receipts would be larger than at Ravenhill.

Unionist opposition to "Amhrán na bhFiann" was strengthened on 25 April 1987, when an IRA roadside bomb killed judge Maurice Gibson and his wife, and also damaged a car carrying three of the senior squad from Belfast to Dublin for training. David Irwin and Philip Rainey recovered but Nigel Carr's rugby career was ended by his injuries. The next month, at the inaugural Rugby World Cup, captain Donal Lenihan objected that all other teams would have an anthem. At the last minute before the side's opening match in Athletic Park, Wellington, a James Last cassette recording of "The Rose of Tralee" was borrowed from Phil Orr; the music and poor recording quality attracted much criticism and no anthem was played for later matches. At the 1991 World Cup, there was no anthem away to Scotland, Ireland's only game outside Dublin.

For the 1995 World Cup in South Africa, the IRFU decided to commission a song from Phil Coulter. His composition, "Ireland's Call", has since been played alongside "Amhrán na bhFiann" at matches within the Republic, and on its own elsewhere. Ireland's match against England at Croke Park in the 2007 Six Nations Championship was of historic significance because of the Rule 42 ban and the memory of Bloody Sunday 1920; The Irish Times commented, "'Amhrán na bhFiann' and 'Ireland's Call' were belted out with such hair-raising intensity that men and women were crying as they sang". Prior to the 2007 resumption of internationals at Ravenhill Stadium, Belfast, the IRFU decided that only "Ireland's Call" would be played, not "God Save the Queen", prompting complaints from some unionists that this did not match the playing of "Amhrán na bhFiann" in Dublin.

== Other sports ==
Other all-island teams have adopted "Ireland's Call" for similar reasons to the IRFU's. The men's and women's hockey teams, having previously used the "Londonderry Air", adopted "Ireland's Call" in 2000, including for Olympic qualification matches, but the Olympic Council of Ireland standard "Amhrán na bhFiann" was used at Rio 2016, its first post-independence appearance at the Olympics.

At the 2000 Rugby League World Cup, the Ireland team had "Amhrán na bhFiann" at a match in England, but no anthem at a match in Belfast. In the years before 2008 it "used neutral symbols and anthems such as 'Ireland's Call'". Rugby League Ireland adopted "Amhrán na bhFiann" for the 2008 World Cup, explaining "'The Soldier's Song' has always been played at amateur level and it was a unanimous decision to extend this policy to the professional game." By the 2017 World Cup it had reverted to "Ireland's Call".

The Irish Waterski and Wakeboard Federation adopted "Ireland's Call" on a one-off basis for the 2016 EA Wakeboard Championships, because they were in Coleraine in "very close proximity to a Loyalist Estate". The National Coarse Fishing Federation of Ireland's policy document states that it 'is a 32 county body and as such the anthem will be "Ireland's Call" except in circumstances where this may cause discomfort or embarrassment. On such occasions the only permitted deviation allowed is "Amhrán na bhFiann".'

== Song ==
The song was written by Phil Coulter in 1995. He said he composed it because he loved hearing a combination of Irish accents singing together. It was first broadcast simultaneously on the Kelly show in Northern Ireland and The Late Late Show in the Republic, sung by Andrew Strong accompanied by the Portadown Male Voice Choir.

At most games today, only the first verse is sung, followed by the chorus in the same key. The chorus is then repeated in a higher key; at the end, the last line is repeated. Several Irish-language translations have been made for Gaelscoil pupils, with the title "Glaoch na hÉireann".

Coulter subsequently rewrote the lyrics to be sung in the Celtic Thunder singing tour, when he collaborated with Sharon Browne, the original producer of Celtic Woman. The rewritten lyrics have a somewhat more martial theme, with lines like "meet our destiny with glory" and "Till our final requiem is spoken".

== Sources ==
- Lenihan, Donal (2016-09-22). Donal Lenihan: My Life in Rugby. Transworld. ISBN 9781473540019.
