= Five Nations XV v Overseas Unions XV =

- Event: IRFB Centenary
Five Nations XV	Overseas Unions XV
13	32
- Date: 19 April 1986
- Venue: Twickenham Stadium, London
- Referee: D. I. H. Burnett (Ireland)

The Five Nations XV v Overseas Unions XV was a rugby union match played on Saturday, 19 April 1986 to commemorate the centenary of the International Rugby Football Board. The Five Nations XV featured players from England, France, Ireland, Scotland, and Wales who had played in the 1986 Five Nations Championship. The Overseas Unions XV was effectively a World XV and featured players from Australia, New Zealand, and South Africa. The Overseas Unions XV won the match 32–15. Controversially, the squad included a number of white South Africans at a time when the relationship of rugby union and apartheid was being questioned at high levels.

== The match ==
Unlike the British Lions v World XV three days earlier in a wet Cardiff Arms Park, this game was played in ideal conditions at Twickenham. At the time, there were only eight Unions affiliated to the Board, thus only players from those unions were chosen.

19 April 1986

Five Nations XV	13 – 32	Overseas Unions XV
Try: Ringland (2) Con: Blanco; Penalty Goal: Kiernan		Try: Gerber (2); Kirwan du Plessis; Rodriguez; Shaw; Con: Botha; Penalty Goal: Botha (2)

Twickenham Stadium, London
Referee: D I H Burnett (Ireland)

Five Nations XV: Serge Blanco (France); Trevor Ringland (Ireland), Philippe Sella (France), Mike Kiernan (Ireland), Rory Underwood (England); Malcolm Dacey (Wales), Richard Hill (England); Jeff Whitefoot (Wales), Steve Brain (England), Iain Milne (Scotland), Jean Condom (France), Donal Lenihan (Ireland) (captain), John Jeffrey (Scotland), Iain Paxton (Scotland), Laurent Rodriguez (France)

- Jacques Fouroux (Coach) (France)
- Clive Rowlands (Manager) (Wales)

Overseas Unions XV: Roger Gould (Australia); John Kirwan (New Zealand), Danie Gerber (South Africa), Warwick Taylor (New Zealand), Carel du Plessis (South Africa); Naas Botha (South Africa), Dave Loveridge (New Zealand); Enrique Rodriguez (Australia), Andy Dalton (New Zealand) (captain), Flippie van der Merwe (South Africa), Steve Cutler (Australia), Andy Haden (New Zealand), Simon Poidevin (Australia), Steve Tuynman (Australia), Mark Shaw (New Zealand)

- Replacements
  - Andrew Slack (not named in programme, but Wayne Smith of New Zealand was) (Australia)
  - Michael Lynagh (Australia)
  - Nick Farr-Jones (Australia)
  - Murray Mexted (New Zealand)
  - Schalk Burger (South Africa)
  - Flippie van der Merwe (named in starting line-up in programme instead of Knight)
  - Tom Lawton (Australia)
- Brian Lochore New Zealand (Coach)
- Bob Templeton Australia (Manager)

== See also ==
- British Lions v World XV
- World XV
