= Van der Merwe =

Disambiguation page

Van der Merwe is a common Afrikaans surname, derived from the Dutch van der Merwen ("from the Merwede river"). It was brought to South Africa in 1661 by Dutch people employed by the Dutch East India Company.

The progenitors of the extended Van der Merwe family are Willem Schalk van der Merwe, born in "Broeck", believed to be near the Merwede River in the Netherlands, and Elsje Cloete. Married in 1668 in Cape Town, they settled as farmers in Hout Bay, then eventually retired to Drakenstein. Their descendants make up a significant portion of the Van der Merwe lineage in the region.

== People ==
- Abraham van der Merwe (1897–1978), pastor, one of the main leaders of the South-African Dutch Reformed Church between 1945 and 1966
- Akker van der Merwe (born 1991), South African rugby union player; older brother of Duhan
- Alan van der Merwe (born 1980), South African racer
- Albert van der Merwe (born 1981), South African-born Irish cricketer
- Alwyn Van der Merwe (born 1927), South African physicist
- André Carl van der Merwe (born 1961), South African novelist
- André van der Merwe (urologist) (born 1967), South African urologist
- André van der Merwe, South African choir conductor
- Andries van der Merwe (born 1994), South African sprinter
- Anika van der Merwe (born 1980), South African Stained Glass Artist
- Armand van der Merwe (born 1999), South African martial artist and University lecturer
- Bertus van der Merwe (1929–1971), South African rugby player
- Cecile van der Merwe (born 1987), South African chess player
- Cornelis van der Merwe (1921–1985), South African government minister
- D. T. H. van der Merwe (born 1986), South African-born Canadian rugby player
- Danie van der Merwe (born 1989), South African rugby player
- Derek van der Merwe, Athletic Director of the Bowling Green Falcons
- Duhan van der Merwe (born 1995), South Africa-born rugby union player who represents Scotland; younger brother of Akker
- Edward van der Merwe (1903–1971), South African cricketer
- Fanie van der Merwe (born 1986), South African Paralympic athlete
- Flip van der Merwe (born 1985), South African rugby player
- Flippie van der Merwe (born 1957), South African rugby player
- Franco van der Merwe (born 1983), South African rugby union player
- François van der Merwe (born 1983), South African rugby player
- Frederick Ziervogel van der Merwe (1894–1968), South African physician and botanist
- Frith van der Merwe (born 1964), South African long-distance athlete
- Gert van der Merwe, South African Paralympic athlete
- Heinke van der Merwe (born 1985), South African rugby player
- Hendrik W. (H.W.) van der Merwe (1929–2001), South African lecturer
- Izak van der Merwe (born 1984), South African tennis player
- Jaap van de Merwe (1924–1989), Dutch comedian and lyricist
- ((Jaco van der Merwe)) (born 1970), South African golfer
- Jan van der Merwe (born 1983), South African sprinter
- Jan van der Merwe (born 1995), South African rugby union player
- Jan H van der Merwe (1922–2016), South African physicist
- Johanna van der Merwe (1825–1888), prominent female voortrekker
- Johannes van der Merwe (born 1980), Namibian cricketer
- Kirby van der Merwe (born 1949), South African writer
- Koos van der Merwe (1937–2024), South African politician
- Krige van der Merwe (born 2006), South African Motocross Racer
- Lourens van der Merwe, South African rugby referee
- Lowaldo van der Merwe (born 1986), Namibian cricketer
- Marcel van der Merwe (born 1990), South African rugby player
- Marina van der Merwe, South African-born Canadian field hockey coach
- Marissa van der Merwe (born 1978), South African cyclist
- Marlice van der Merwe (now Marlice van Vuuren, born 1976), Namibian conservationist
- Morné van der Merwe (1973–2013), South African rugby player
- Musetta van der Merwe (known as Musetta Vander, born 1963), South African actress and model
- Peter van der Merwe, South African musicologist
- Peter van der Merwe (1937–2013), South African cricketer
- Peter van de Merwe (1942–2016), Dutch football goalkeeper
- Pieter van der Merwe, British maritime historian
- Petrus van der Merwe, (born 1976) Founder CEO ECAHLI and Humanity Unite International
- Reinier van der Merwe (born 2008), South African Motocross Racer
- Roelof van der Merwe (born 1984), international cricketer from South Africa and Netherlands
- Ryno van der Merwe (born 1979), South African rugby player
- Sarel van der Merwe (born 1946), South African rally car driver
- Schalk van der Merwe (1922–1984), South African politician and surgeon
- Schalk van der Merwe (1961–2016), South African tennis player
- Schalk van der Merwe (rugby union), Schalk van der Merwe (born 1990), South African rugby player
- Senan van der Merwe (born 1986), South African rugby player
- Shadine van der Merwe, South Africa netball international
- Sonja van der Merwe (born 1992), South African sprinter
- Stoffel van der Merwe (born 1939), South African diplomat and politician
- Sue van der Merwe (born 1959), South African politician
- Strijdom van der Merwe (born 1961), South African artist
- Yulandi van der Merwe (born 1977), South African cricketer
- Antonie van der Merwe (born 1990), South African storyteller
- Donovan-Dee van der Merwe (born 1994), South African entrepreneur

== Characters in fiction ==
- Wikus van de Merwe, protagonist of the 2009 film District 9
- Van der Merwe (2017 film)

== See also ==
- Van Der Merwe Miszewski Architects
- SAS Johanna Van der Merwe
