= British Lions v The Rest =

1986 rugby match

- Event: IRFB Centenary
British Lions	The Rest
7	15
- Date: 16 April 1986
- Venue: Cardiff Arms Park
- Referee: R C Francis (New Zealand)
- Weather: Wet

British Lions v The Rest was a 1986 rugby union match that saw the British Lions play against 'The Rest' to celebrate the centenary of the International Rugby Football Board. The Rest consisted of players from Australia, France, New Zealand and South Africa. At the time, there were only eight unions affiliated to the Board, thus only players from those countries were chosen. The Rest beat the Lions 15–7 in April 1986 in the match played at Cardiff Arms Park.

== British & Irish Lions selection ==
The Lions team was selected by the Four Home Unions committee which organises Lions tours. The Lions would have toured South Africa in 1986 if the regular schedule had been followed, but in December 1985 the South African Rugby Board announced they would not be inviting the Lions side to tour South Africa the following year. Political objections to South Africa's apartheid policies including a potential boycott of the 1986 Commonwealth Games and state of emergency in South Africa at the time lay behind this decision. The Lions squad was managed by Clive Rowlands and coached by Mick Doyle. The 21 players selected were issued with Lions' blazers and ties and considered to be official British Lions.

== The match ==
The match was a midweek game in Cardiff. The wet weather marred the game, in marked contrast to the Overseas Unions match three days later played in ideal conditions at Twickenham.

16 April 1986

British Lions	7–15	The Rest
Try: Beattie; Pen: Hastings	Report	Try: Farr-Jones; Poidevin; Con: Lynagh (2); Pen: Lynagh

Cardiff Arms Park, Cardiff
Referee: Bob Francis (New Zealand)

British Lions
The Rest

FB	15	(Scotland) Gavin Hastings
RW	14	(Ireland) Trevor Ringland
OC	13	(Ireland) Brendan Mullin
IC	12	(Wales) John Devereux
LW	11	(England) Rory Underwood
FH	10	(Scotland) John Rutherford	Substituted off
SH	9	(Wales) Robert Jones
N8	8	(Scotland) John Beattie
OF	7	(Ireland) Nigel Carr
BF	6	(Scotland) John Jeffrey
RL	5	(Ireland) Donal Lenihan
LL	4	(England) Wade Dooley	Substituted off
TP	3	(Ireland) Des Fitzgerald
HK	2	(Scotland) Colin Deans (c)
LP	1	(Wales) Jeff Whitefoot
Replacements:
CE	16	(Ireland) Mike Kiernan
SH	17	(England) Richard Hill
FH	18	(Wales) Malcolm Dacey	Substituted in
PR	19	(Scotland) Iain Milne
HK	20	(England) Steve Brain
LK	21	(Scotland) Iain Paxton	Substituted in
Coach:
(Ireland) Mick Doyle

FB	15	(France) Serge Blanco
RW	14	(France) Patrick Estève
OC	13	(Australia) Andrew Slack (c)
IC	12	(Australia) Michael Lynagh
LW	11	(New Zealand) John Kirwan
FH	10	(New Zealand) Wayne Smith
SH	9	(Australia) Nick Farr-Jones
N8	8	(New Zealand) Murray Mexted
BF	7	(Australia) Simon Poidevin
OF	6	(New Zealand) Mark Shaw
RL	5	(South Africa) Schalk Burger
LL	4	(Australia) Steve Cutler
TP	3	(New Zealand) Gary Knight
HK	2	(Australia) Tom Lawton
LP	1	(Australia) Enrique Rodriguez
Replacements:
HK	16
PR	17	(South Africa) Danie Gerber
PR	18	(South Africa) Naas Botha
LK	19	(New Zealand) Andy Dalton
LK	20	(South Africa) Flippie van der Merwe
FL	21	(Australia) Steve Tuynman
Coach:

== See also ==
- Five Nations XV v Overseas Unions XV
- World XV
