= Nigel Carr =

Ireland rugby union international

Nigel Carr MBE
- Born: Nigel John Carr; 27 July 1959 (age 67) Belfast, Northern Ireland
- School: Regent House Grammar School
- University: Queen's University

Rugby union career
- Position: Flanker
Senior career
| Years | Team | Apps | (Points) |
- Queen's University
| – | Ards RFC | | |
Provincial / State sides
| Years | Team | Apps | (Points) |
- Ulster
International career
| Years | Team | Apps | (Points) |
| 1985-1987 | Ireland | 11 | (0) |
| 1986 | British Lions | | |

Nigel Carr MBE (born 27 July 1959) is a former Ireland rugby union international. His career was cut short due to injuries sustained in an IRA bomb explosion. His service as a player, selector, broadcaster, and charity volunteer was recognised by the 2021 Birthday Honours award of an MBE for his contribution to sport and community relations. This was underscored in 2025 after induction into the Irish Rugby Writers’ Hall of Fame and the conferral of an Honorary Doctorate from Queen’s University Belfast.

== Early life ==
Nigel John Carr was born in Belfast on 27 July 1959. He was a very talented footballer, sought by Glentoran (signed by Larne FC), before focusing on rugby union. He captained the Ulster Under 19 team, subsequently representing Ulster U-23 & Ireland U-23 followed by an Ireland 'B' cap in 1979 plus further 'B' appearances in 1980, 1982 and 1984. He won his first senior cap in 1985.

== Senior rugby career ==
Carr frequently transformed the teams he joined, bringing previously rare or unforeseen success, often as one half of an extremely effective back-row duo along with Phillip Matthews. They played together at Regent House Grammar School, Queen's University, Ards RFC, Ulster and Ireland from the mid 1970s and into the late 1980s.

His influence as captain lead to Regent House reaching the Ulster Schools Cup final for the first time ever in the world's second-oldest rugby competition. In his earliest year at Ards RFC the club were promoted to the senior league as the Ulster Rugby’s Team of the Year for the first time since their foundation in 1928. Queen's "seasons in the doldrums" immediately changed to Ulster Senior League winners with Ulster Senior Cup success the following season (the "ubiquitous" Carr being the game's "Player of the Season" while also representing Irish and British Universities with Queen's as "Team of the Season".)

Carr's two-year absence from the Ulster team ended weeks after a third knee operation, when he was widely praised for an "immense contribution" and "playing magnificently" in the defeat of the 1984 Grand Slam Australian team. This marked the beginning of Ulster's decade of dominance as "one of the best provincial teams in Irish rugby history".

Carr made a winning senior international debut against Scotland at Murrayfield on 2 February 1985 (Ireland having lost all their games in the preceding 1984 Five Nations Championship season). He was a critical part of the undefeated (for the first time since 1951) Triple Crown and Championship winning side of 1985, his performances "having a profound influence on Ireland's success". Ireland did not enjoy another undefeated Championship until 2009. He was injured on the subsequent 1985 Japan tour, with a first comeback game (for Ards 5th XV) in January 1986 ahead of an international return v Wales on 15 Feb 1986. Despite his country's 5 Nations Championship defeats, Carr was the clear choice for the 1986 Lions as openside flanker, even though the English and Scottish contenders (Winterbottom and Calder) are by expert opinion and popular choice, those countries greatest ever in that position and the Welsh challenger, who captained his country (Pickering) judged one of their greatest. Although Carr never toured with the Lions, he was considered the pick of the Lions pack when playing for them against a powerful Rest of the World team (which included 6 World Rugby Hall of Fame opponents) in a one-off Test match in Cardiff (16 April 1986).

He won his 12th and final cap in 1987 against Wales at Cardiff Arms Park. Carr, the Rugby World & Post Feb 1987's No.1 openside flanker, missed out on the inaugural 1987 Rugby World Cup because he was forced to prematurely end his career through injuries due to an IRA car-bomb. On 25 April 1987, Carr, David Irwin and Philip Rainey had set off for a training session in Dublin before the World Cup. On that day the IRA had targeted Lord Justice Sir Maurice Gibson - Northern Ireland's second most senior judge - who was travelling back from holiday with his wife, Lady Cecily Gibson, when a 500 lb land mine was detonated at Killean, on the border, killing them both. The three Ireland internationals were on the same stretch of road when the bomb exploded and although miraculously, they all escaped serious injury, the explosion ended Carr's rugby career at just 27. This incident is widely accepted (even beyond Ireland]) as the critical impetus to the creation of “Ireland's Call” as a new and additional/alternative sporting anthem, subsequently adopted beyond rugby by other sports.

Carr has been described as one of the best players to have pulled on the Irish jersey, also playing for the Barbarians. Willie Anderson explained this as "Nigel Carr was a professional player in an amateur era. His dedication to ensuring he was in peak condition to play rugby football was second to none". Anderson added "not only had he tremendous speed, but he had anticipated where it (the ball) would be long before others realised it was there. I know the guys in the professional games these days are super-fit. But I can tell you Nigel was fitter than any of them."

Carr was selected on the Greatest Ever Ulster Team and was the openside flanker choice of such rugby authorities as Jack Kyle and Syd Millar (the former named the Greatest Ever Irish Rugby Player, the latter cited as Greatest Coach, by the Irish Rugby Football Union in 2002).

Despite Carr's achievements and associated accolades, his unfulfilled potential is almost as striking. Lions captain, Colin Deans believed that "Carr's pace and athleticism would have been a handful in South Africa" had the 1986 Lions tour not been abandoned due to Apartheid. Likewise, his world ranking as the No.1 openside flanker leading up to the inaugural 1987 Rugby World Cup, could have assured Ireland at least a semi-final berth, were it not for his injury in a fatal explosion with the consequential "massive detrimental effect on the whole team" — an achievement that eluded the team both then and for over three decades since.

After retiring as a player, Carr served as a selector for Ulster.

== Career and personal life ==
Dr Nigel Carr previously managed innovation, research & technology support from Invest NI in Belfast and also produced and presented a UTV sports programme, Sport on Sunday.
