= Polutele =

Polutele is a given name and surname. Notable people with the name include:

- Polutele Tu'ihalamaka (born 1949), Tongan rugby union player
- Napole Polutele (born 1965), French politician
