= Soakai =

Soakai is a given name and surname. Notable people with the name include:

- Alando Soakai (born 1983), New Zealand rugby union player
- Soakai Motuʻapuaka (born c. 1953), Tongan rugby union player
