= Guastella =

Guastella is an Italian surname. Notable people with the surname include:

- Ángel Guastella (1931–2016), Argentine rugby union player
- Joseph T. Guastella (born 1965), American retired lieutenant general
