= Jeff Whitefoot =

Jeff Whitefoot may refer to:

- Jeff Whitefoot (rugby union) (born 1956), Welsh former international rugby union player
- Jeff Whitefoot (footballer) (1933–2024), English footballer
