= Rugby Pack =

French television series

- Starring: Rodolphe Pires; Louis Bonnery; Éric Bonneval
- Country of origin: France

Production
- Running time: 60 minutes

Original release
- Network: beIN Sports
- Release: April 12, 2013 – present

Rugby Pack is a French rugby programme for beIN Sports.
