= The Troubles in Killean =

Incidents in Killean, Northern Ireland during the Troubles

The Troubles in Killean recounts incidents during, and the effects of, The Troubles in and around the village of Killean (or Killeen), County Armagh, Northern Ireland.

Incidents in and around Killean during the Troubles resulting in two or more fatalities:

== 1971 ==
- 27 November 1971 - Ian Hankin (27), Protestant and James O'Neill (39), Catholic, both civilian customs officials, were shot and killed by Provisional Irish Republican Army snipers firing at a British Army patrol which had just arrived after a bomb attack on Killean Customs Post, near Newry.

== 1975 ==
- 3 June 1975 - David Thompson (34) and John Presha (30), both Protestant civilians and Alfred Doyle (24), a Protestant off duty member of the Ulster Defence Regiment, were found shot dead by the Provisional Irish Republican Army in David Thompson's car at Killean.
- 6 December 1975 - James Lochrie (19) and Sean Campbell (20), both Catholic members of the Provisional Irish Republican Army, were killed when a land mine exploded prematurely at Kelly's Road, Killean.

== 1985 ==
- 20 May 1985 - William Wilson (28), Stephen Rodgers (19), David Baird (22) and Tracy Doak (21), all Protestant members of the Royal Ulster Constabulary, were killed by a Provisional Irish Republican Army remote controlled bomb, hidden in a parked trailer and detonated when their mobile patrol passed at Killean.

== 1987 ==
- 25 April 1987 - Lord Justice Sir Maurice Gibson (74) and Lady Cecily Gibson (67), his wife, both Protestant civilians, were killed by a Provisional Irish Republican Army remote controlled bomb hidden in a parked car and detonated when they drove past at Killean.

== 1988 ==
- 23 July 1988 - Robert James Hanna, his wife Maureen Hanna (both 44) and their son David Hanna (aged 7), all Protestant civilians, were killed and 3 bystanders were injured in a Provisional Irish Republican Army land mine attack on their Jeep Shogun in Killean. In a statement following the attack, the IRA took responsibility for the bombing while also alluding to the fact that the bomb was intended for a vehicle carrying an important government figure, most likely High Court Judge Eoin Higgins, a frequent target of IRA assassination attempts. In the Statement, the IRA called the Hanna family "unfortunate victims of mistaken identity", but latter added "This bomb, which was to be detonated by remote control, exploded prematurely, tragically killing three civilians."
