= Vunivalu =

Vunivalu may refer to

- Vunivalu of Bau, a Fijian nobility title
- Vunivalu of Rewa, a Fijian nobility title

- Samuela Vunivalu (born c. 1957), Fijian politician and rugby union player
- Suliasi Vunivalu (born 1995), Fijian rugby league footballer
