= Tuihalamaka =

Tuihalamaka or Tuʻihalamaka is a surname. Notable people with the surname include:

- Sione Tuihalamaka (born 1991), American football player
- Polutele Tuʻihalamaka (born 1949), Tongan rugby union player
