= Brian Surgener =

US international rugby union player

- Born: April 6, 1978 (age 48) Anaheim, CA, United States
- Height: 6 ft 4 in (193 cm)
- Weight: 240 lb (109 kg)

Rugby union career
- Position: Lock / Flanker
International career
Years	Team	Apps	(Points)
2001–05	United States	12	(0)

Brian Surgener (born April 6, 1978) is an American former international rugby union player.

Born in Anaheim, Surgener attended Diamond Bar High School and came to rugby from college football, having been a tight end with the California Golden Bears between 1997 and 2000.

Surgener captained the Back Bay Rugby Club and was capped 12 times for the United States national team from 2001 to 2005, as a lock and occasional flanker. He made his debut against the Springboks in Houston.

== See also ==
- List of United States national rugby union players
