= John Rawlins (rugby union) =

Wales international rugby union footballer

- Born: 7 June 1957 (age 69) Caerphilly, Wales
- Height: 6 ft 0 in (1.83 m)
- Weight: 15 st 10 lb (100 kg)
- School: South Glamorgan Institute

Rugby union career
- Position: Prop
Senior career
Years	Team	Apps	(Points)
1981-1982	Cardiff	15	(0)
1982-1987	Newport	156	(12)
1987-1988	Swansea	2	(0)
International career
Years	Team	Apps	(Points)
1982-1987	Wales		

John Rawlins (born 7 June 1957 in Caerphilly) is a former Welsh rugby union player who played as a prop. He played 16 games for Cardiff in the season 1981/82 before leaving to join Newport where he played 188 games. One of which was a Cup game against Cardiff.

Rawlins was a member of Cardiff Youth and then played a couple of games for Cardiff and also went on the tour to South Africa in the summer of 1982. John just missed out on a first XV cap. In 1982, Rawlins moved to Newport, forming a formidable front row with Rhys Morgan and Mike Watkins. He also was in the 1987 Rugby World Cup squad and named in the squad for a Test with Japan but never saw action, as he was replaced by Jeff Whitefoot. In 1987, Rawlins moved to Swansea, where he had 2 caps and ended his career.
