= Maurice Gibson =

Northern Irish judge (1913–1987)

The Right Honorable Sir Maurice Gibson
- Lord Justice Gibson

Judge of the High Court
- In office 1968–1975

Lord Justice of Appeal
- In office 1975–1987

Personal details
- Born: 1 May 1913 Belfast, Ireland
- Died: 25 April 1987 (aged 73) Killean, County Armagh, Northern Ireland
- Spouse(s): Cecily Winifred Johnson, Lady Gibson
- Children: 2
- Education: Queen's University Belfast

Sir Maurice Gibson, PC (1 May 1913 – 25 April 1987), was a Lord Justice of Appeal in Northern Ireland. He was killed, along with his wife Cecily, Lady Gibson by the Provisional Irish Republican Army (IRA).

== Biography ==
Sir Maurice was born in Montpelier House, Belfast. He was educated at the Royal Belfast Academical Institution and graduated with a law degree from Queen's University Belfast. He was called to the bar in 1937 and subsequently elected a bencher in 1961 and described by Lord MacDermott in 1968 as the best lawyer at the Bar. In 1968 he became Chancery Judge and in 1975 Lord Justice of Appeal. The couple had two children.

In 1977, he acquitted the soldier who shot Majella O'Hare, a 12-year-old girl, in the back, twice. The UK government apologised for this killing in 2011 and said the justification Gibson accepted was "unlikely".

== Death ==
Lord Justice Gibson and his wife were killed by a remote controlled car bomb as they drove over the Irish border back into Northern Ireland on 25 April 1987 after a holiday in the United States. As the judge's car reached Drumad, the townland on the County Louth side of the border, he stopped to shake hands with the Garda Síochána security escort who had completed their part of the assignment. The couple had only a short drive to meet the Royal Ulster Constabulary escort to Belfast.

Between the two points lay the bomb, near a petrol station near Killean in County Armagh. The explosion threw the Gibsons' vehicle across the road, killing the couple immediately. The explosion also injured Ireland national rugby union team players Nigel Carr, David Irwin and Philip Rainey who were in a car on the same road.

The case was investigated by the Cory Collusion Inquiry into cases of collusion between security forces and paramilitaries after persistent questions over whether the Garda Siochana had tipped off the IRA of the Gibson's travel arrangements. Cory found insufficient evidence to warrant a public inquiry into the incident. The later Smithwick Tribunal found that Cory had been "mistaken" in questioning the reliability of intelligence that a member of the Garda had helped the IRA in the Gibsons' murders, and in May 2014, former Northern Ireland First Minister Lord Trimble called for an inquiry into whether there was collusion.
