= Julián Manuele =

Argentine rugby union player

- Born: October 30, 1966 (age 60) La Plata, Argentina

Rugby union career
- Position: Fly-half
Senior career
Years	Team	Apps	(Points)
198?-1995	La Plata		
International career
Years	Team	Apps	(Points)
1987	Argentina	0	(0)

Julián Manuele (born 30 October 1966 in La Plata) is a former Argentine rugby union player. He played as a fly-half.

== Career ==
He played for all his career for La Plata Rugby Club , where he also played alongside players such as Guillermo Angaut and German Llanes. He was called up for the Argentina national rugby union team before the 1987 Rugby World Cup, however, he did not play any match in the tournament due to an injury, with the first choice fly-half being Hugo Porta. He was also part of the 1995 La Plata squad which won the Nacional de Clubes in that year.
