= Ed Burlingham =

US international rugby union player

- Born: Edward Burlingham; October 14, 1951 (age 75) Newport Beach, California
- University: University of California

Rugby union career
- Position: Lock
Amateur team(s)
Years	Team	Apps	(Points)
1974–1985	Irvine Coast RFC		
1985–1987	Back Bay Rugby Club		
International career
Years	Team	Apps	(Points)
1980–1987	United States	14	(0)

Ed Burlingham (born October 14, 1951) is a former American rugby union player who played as a lock. He was president of Back Bay RFC.

== Career ==
Burlingham started his rugby career in 1974 at Irvine Coast RFC in Newport Beach, California following a successful four years of college basketball at the University of California, Irvine. He worked his way quickly through Southern California and Pacific Coast Grizzly selections leading up to the awarding of his first cap against the New Zealand All Blacks in 1980.

Ed went on to earn 14 caps for the US National Team and captained the Eagles during the first Rugby World Cup in 1987. He captained the Eagles during his 7-year campaign with the USA Rugby team in games against Canada, England, South Africa, Japan and the 1983 tour of Australia. Ed was also named to the prestigious North American Barbarians team to tour South Africa in 1982.

Burlingham has been active with USA Rugby since his playing days ended and was named Assistant Coach of the 1991 Eagle Rugby World Cup squad. He is now involved with Back Bay RFC in his hometown of Newport Beach and has served as Club President and Head Coach as well as assisting with many other club responsibilities.

Burlingham was inducted to the USAR Hall of Fame in 2015 and is a life member of Back Bay Rugby.
