= John Horton (rugby union) =

England international rugby union player (born 1951)

John Philip Horton (born 11 April 1951) is an English retired rugby union player. Born in St. Helens, Merseyside John grew up in the Windle area of the town and attended the nearby high school, now known as Cowley International College where he started playing both rugby league and rugby union.

== Playing career ==
After a brief stint playing for local side Liverpool St Helens F.C., his first semi-professional contract was at Sale Sharks. Horton then moved to Bath to play professionally whilst teaching, making 380 appearances for the club between 1973 and 1985. He made his debut against Terenure in 1973 and captained the side in 1976-77 and 1979-80. During his time at Bath, Horton amassed a total of 80 tries and a remarkable 125 drop goals. He later played for Bristol when Stuart Barnes joined from the West Country rivals in 1985. Horton was known as a mercurial playmaker and he went on to earn 13 caps for England between 1978 and 1984, scoring 12 points. John's international debut came at Twickenham in England’s 6-9 defeat by Wales on February 4, 1978. Horton's career highlight would undoubtedly be his steepling drop goals in England’s first win in Paris in 16 years back in 1980, a match which paved the way for an England Grand Slam. Horton was invited back to make two guest appearances in 1988, against Bedford and Public School Wanderers.

== Later life ==
As of June 2017, Horton still resides in the Bath area and spent his later years serving as a sporting director for Kingswood School, a private day and boarding school in Bath, Somerset, where he formerly worked as a teacher.
