= Club Manuel Belgrano =

Rugby and field hockey club in Buenos Aires, Argentina

(Argentina) Manuel Belgrano
- Full name: Asociación Civil Club Manuel Belgrano
- Union: URBA
- Nickname: Azulgrana
- Founded: 17 October 1958; 68 years ago
- Location: Saavedra, Buenos Aires
- Ground(s): Ingeniero Maschwitz, Greater Buenos Aires
- President: Claudio Calzetta
- League: URBA Primera B
- 2026: 5th. (promoted via playoff)
Team kit

Official website
- clubmanuelbelgrano.com.ar

Club Manuel Belgrano is an Argentine amateur sports club, headquartered in the neighborhood of Saavedra in Buenos Aires, while its rugby stadium is located in Ingeniero Maschwitz, Greater Buenos Aires.

The rugby union team currently plays at Primera B, the third division of the URBA league system, while the field hockey section is affiliated to the Buenos Aires Hockey Association.

The club has around 700 rugby players and 250 field hockey players registered.

== History ==
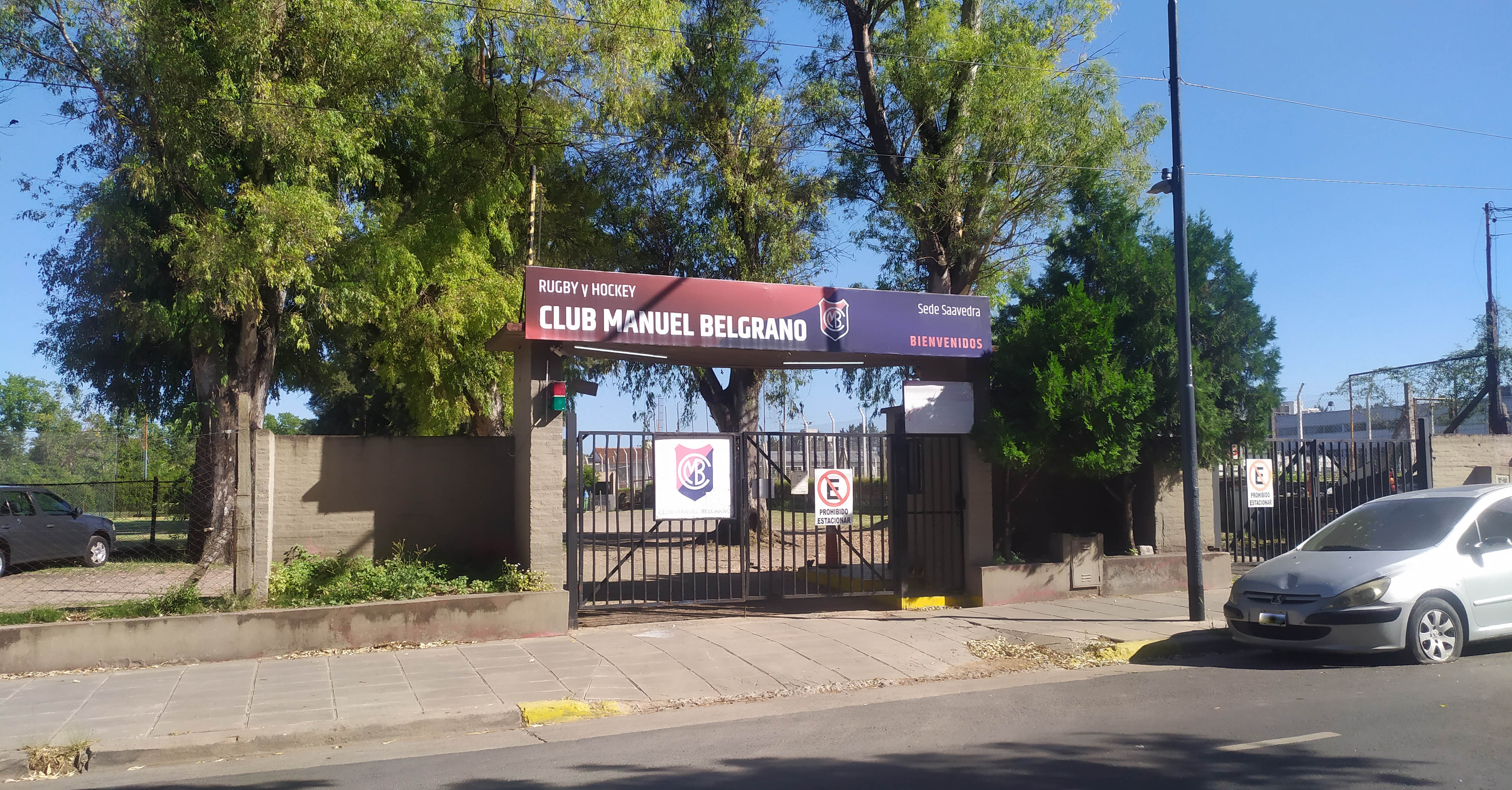
Club headquarters in Saavedra, Buenos Aires, as seen in 2026

In 1955 the Marist Brothers College Manuel Belgrano registered a rugby team to participate in the tournaments organized by the Unión Argentina de Rugby, under the name of "Los Tábanos" ("The Horseflies"). On October 1, 1958, the club was officially founded as "Club Manuel Belgrano", being soon accepted by the Union and also supported by other clubs such as Club Atlético San Isidro and Obras Sanitarias.

On May 2, 1959, Manuel Belgrano played its first match against Atalaya. The following years the team participated in the "Classification" zone until 1962 when Belgrano proclaimed champion and was promoted to the "Ascenso" level. In 2007 the club reached the first division where they played until in 2011 Manuel Belgrano was relegated to Grupo II, but after one season, Manuel Belgrano promoted again to Grupo I. Patricio Albacete is the club's most famous player.

José Mostany (1986–87), Patricio Albacete (2003–14) and Martín Ignes (2012), were players of the Argentina national team.
