= Back Bay Rugby Club =

US rugby union club, based in Newport Beach, CA

(United States) Back Bay Rugby Club
- Full name: Back Bay Rugby Football Club
- Union: USA Rugby
- Nickname: Sharks
- Founded: 1985; 41 years ago
- Location: Peninsula Park
- President: Michael Wendal
- League: SCRFU Division 3

Official website
- www.backbayrfc.com

Back Bay Rugby Football Club (Back Bay RFC) competes in the Southern California Rugby Football Union 3rd Division. The club was founded in 1985 with the consolidation of two first division clubs, Irvine Coast and Newport Beach. Consolidated with Huntington Beach Unicorns as the Beach City Narwahls.

== Pitch ==
The Back Bay RFC practice pitch is located at St. John the Baptist School in Costa Mesa. Home league matches are played at Peninsula Park, located on A Street in Newport Beach.

== Club Honors ==
- 2015 Southern California Rugby Football Union (SCRFU) Division 2 Champions
- 2009 Southern California Rugby Football Union (SCRFU) Division 2 Champions

== Capped players ==
The following former Back Bay players have been capped by the USA Rugby Union National Team, known as the "Eagles."

- Ed Burlingham
- Brian Surgener
- David Fee
