= Flip van der Merwe =

South Africa international rugby union player

- Full name: Phillip Rudolph van der Merwe
- Born: 3 May 1985 (age 41) Potchefstroom, South Africa
- Height: 1.98 m (6 ft 6 in)
- Weight: 126 kg (19 st 12 lb; 278 lb)
- School: Grey College, Bloemfontein
- University: University of the Free State
- Notable relative(s): Flippie van der Merwe (father), François van der Merwe (brother)

Rugby union career
- Position: Lock
Youth career
- 2004–2006: Free State Cheetahs
Senior career
Years	Team	Apps	(Points)
2006–2009	Free State Cheetahs	36	(10)
2007–2009	Cheetahs	6	(5)
2007	→ Griffons	1	(0)
2009–2012	Blue Bulls	39	(20)
2010–2015	Bulls	75	(10)
2015–2019	Clermont	82	(20)
- Correct as of 23 June 2015
International career
Years	Team	Apps	(Points)
2004	South Africa Under-19		
2010–2015	South Africa	36	(5)
- Correct as of 25 July 2015

Phillip Rudolph van der Merwe (born 3 May 1985 in Potchefstroom) is a South African rugby union rugby player who plays in the lock position for French Top 14 side Clermont.

== Career ==
=== Free State Cheetahs / Cheetahs ===
Van der Merwe attended Grey College in Bloemfontein before joining the Bloemfontein-based provincial side the Free State Cheetahs. He made his first class debut for them in the 2006 Vodacom Cup – eventually starting eleven matches and playing off the bench on two occasions – and also made his Currie Cup debut in the second half of 2006, three times appearing as a replacement during the competition.

In 2007, he got his first taste of Super Rugby, starting two matches for the Cheetahs during the 2007 Super 14 season. He made five appearances in the 2007 Vodacom Cup, but his only Currie Cup involvement in 2007 came in one match on loan at the Griffons.

He made three appearances for the Cheetahs during the 2008 Super 14 season and also scored his first try in Super Rugby. He played a bigger part in their Currie Cup campaign in 2008, making seven appearances.

=== Blue Bulls / Bulls ===
In 2009, Van der Merwe moved to Pretoria to join the Blue Bulls. He immediately established himself as a first-choice player for them, making eleven starts and two substitute appearances in the 2009 Currie Cup Premier Division. He also featured for the Bulls in the 2010 Super 14 season before being called up to the South African national team for the first time.

He became an important part of the Bulls side over the next few years, making 75 appearances for the side in Super Rugby competitions between 2010 and 2015. He also featured in 39 first class matches for the Blue Bulls between 2009 and 2012, with national team call-ups and injury preventing him from playing for them in 2013 and 2014.

=== Clermont ===
Shortly before the 2015 Super Rugby season, the Bulls announced that Van der Merwe would leave after the 2015 Currie Cup Premier Division to take up a contract with French Top 14 side Clermont. He was later given an early release from his contract and made the move to Clermont during the Currie Cup campaign.

=== Representative rugby ===
On 12 June 2010, he played his first test for the South African national team, the Springboks, against France. He missed out on selection to the 2011 Rugby World Cup, but established himself as a regular for the team over the next few years, appearing in 36 test matches prior to his move to Clermont in 2015.

== Personal ==
His father Flippie was also a rugby player, making six appearances for South Africa between 1981 and 1989.
