= Philip Rainey =

Irish rugby union player

Philip Rainey (born 12 July 1959, in Ballymena, Northern Ireland) is an Irish rugby union former player who played fullback for Ballymena, Ulster and Ireland.

Nicknamed "Chipper", he won 42 caps for Ulster, with whom he won six consecutive IRFU Interprovincial Championships, and helped them beat Australia in 1984 by scoring a last-minute 45-metre penalty. In 1987 he and his Ulster teammates Nigel Carr and David Irwin were caught up in the IRA bomb that killed Lord Justice Maurice Gibson and his wife while driving to an Ireland training session. He was part of the Ireland squad for the 1987 Rugby World Cup, but did not play. His one cap for Ireland came against New Zealand in 1989. He retired from representative rugby in 1990, but continued to play for Ballymena, and served a selector for Ulster.
