= Malcolm Dacey =

- Born: Malcolm Dacey; 12 July 1960 (age 66) Swansea, Wales
- School: Cefn Hengoed Comprehensive

Rugby union career
- Position: Fly-half
Amateur team(s)
Years	Team	Apps	(Points)
- Bonymaen RFC
1983-2002	Swansea RFC	271	(384)
1987-1989	Cardiff RFC	32	(35)
–	Pontypool RFC		
1982-1985	Barbarian F.C.	4	(0)
International career
Years	Team	Apps	(Points)
1983–1987	Wales	15	(36)

Malcolm Dacey (born 12 July 1960 in Swansea) is a former Wales international rugby union player who attained 15 international caps. An outside-half, he played club rugby for Swansea RFC. Dacey had 2 spells with Swansea firstly between 1978 and 1992 and then 1990-92. He scored 48 tries in his 271 appearances.

Dacey made an appearance for the British & Irish Lions, coming on as a replacement against a Rest of the World XV in 1986. Dacey also played for the Five Nations XV versus the Overseas Unions in 1986. He also represented the Wales B team and the Barbarians.
