= Peceli Gale =

Fijian rugby union footballer (born 1957)

- Born: 27 June 1957 (age 69) Nawaka, Nadi, Fiji
- Height: 5 ft 11 in (1.80 m)
- Weight: 196 lb (89 kg)

Rugby union career
- Position: Number 8
Senior career
Years	Team	Apps	(Points)
19-19	Nawaka		
- Nadi
International career
Years	Team	Apps	(Points)
1984-1988	Fiji	12	(12)

Peceli Gale (born Nawaka, 27 June 1957) is a Fijian former rugby union footballer. He played as number eight.

== Career ==
His first cap for Fiji was during the match against Tonga, at Suva, on 24 July 1984. Gale was also part of the 1987 Rugby World Cup roster, playing only the match against Argentina, at Hamilton, on 24 May, where he was replaced by Samuela Vunivalu. His last test His last international cap was against England, at Suva, on 16 June 1988.
