= François van der Merwe =

South African rugby union player

- Born: François van der Merwe; 4 October 1983 (age 43) Bloemfontein, South Africa
- Height: 1.98 m (6 ft 6 in)
- Weight: 127 kg (20 st 0 lb)
- Notable relative(s): Flippie van der Merwe (father), Flip van der Merwe (brother)

Rugby union career
- Position: Lock
Senior career
Years	Team	Apps	(Points)
2008–17	Racing Métro	213	(65)
2017-	Lyon OU	37	(0)
- Correct as of 20 December 2019
Provincial / State sides
Years	Team	Apps	(Points)
2006–2008	Western Province	48	(20)
Super Rugby
Years	Team	Apps	(Points)
2007–2008	Stormers	6	(5)

François van der Merwe is a South African professional rugby union player. He plays at lock for Lyon Olympique in the Top 14. He is older brother of Flip van der Merwe
