= Ángel Guastella =

Argentine rugby player

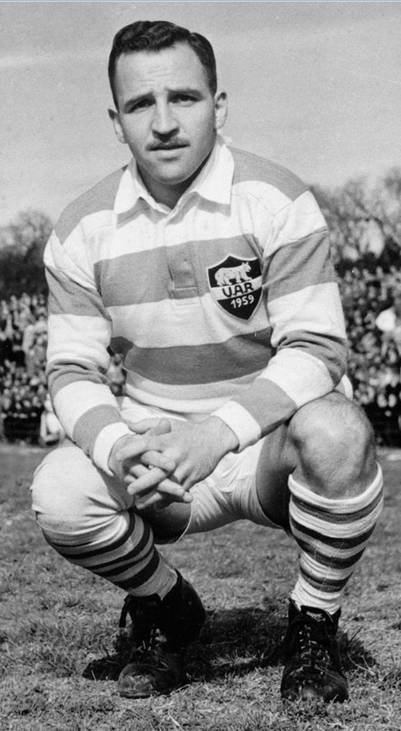
- Guastella playing for Argentina
- Born: 7 November 1931 Buenos Aires, Argentina
- Died: 29 September 2016 (aged 84) San Miguel de Tucumán, Argentina
- Occupation: Teacher

Rugby union career
- Position: Fly-half
Senior career
Years	Team	Apps	(Points)
1953–1963	Club Pueyrredón		
International career
Years	Team	Apps	(Points)
1956-60	Argentina	24	(16)
Coaching career
- Years: Team
- 1983–1985: Argentina
- 1953-78: Club Pueyrredón
- 1978: Argentina
- 1985-1987: Argentina (assistant coach)

Ángel Guastella (Buenos Aires, 7 November 1931 - San Miguel de Tucumán, 26 September 2016) was an Argentine rugby union footballer and coach. He played as fly-half.

== Biography ==
Guastella was a founding member of Club Pueyrredón, of which he was a player for 10 years and then, a coach.

In 2000, Guastella moved to San Miguel de Tucumán, where he spent his last years of life, being chairman of Tucumán Lawn Tennis Club and of Unión de Rugby de Tucumán.

== Career ==
Guastella was an Argentine international with the Pumas between 1956 and 1960. He was first capped during a match against an Oxford and Cambridge XV in Buenos Aires, on 16 September 1956. His last cap was during the test against France, in Buenos Aires, on 6 August 1960. In his international career, Guastella played 4 matches and scored 1 penalty and 6 points in aggregate.

=== Coaching career ===
Guastella came to the Argentina national team along with Alberto Camardón, with both being assistants for the South African coach Izak van Heerden in 1964. After the historical 1965 tour in South Africa, van Heerden remained in his home country and Guastella was named as his substitute in 1965. As coach, he won four South American Rugby Championships and resigned in 1973. Later, in 1978, he accepted the offer to return to coach Argentina, with his assistants being José Imhoff and Aitor Otaño. In this last stage, Guastella decided to build a new team from scratch: first, naming Hugo Porta as captain, later, calling up the veteran Héctor Silva and young players such as Marcelo Campo, Alejandro Iachetti, Marcelo Loffreda, Rafael Madero, Tomás Petersen and Gabriel Travaglini.

=== As assistant coach ===
Between 1985 and 1987, as assistant coach for Héctor Silva, the Argentina achieved its first victory against France, draw against New Zealand and was eliminated from the 1987 Rugby World Cup pool stage. The first edition of the Rugby World Cup was Guastella's last stint with the Pumas.

== Honours ==
South American Rugby Championship champion
1967, 1969, 1971 and 1973.
Campeonato Argentino champion
1955, 1957 and 1958.
