= Sergio Carossio =

Argentine rugby union player (born 1962)

- Born: October 29, 1962 (age 64) Buenos Aires, Argentina
- Occupation(s): Physiotherapist, Kinesiologist

Rugby union career
- Position: Lock
Senior career
Years	Team	Apps	(Points)
198?-1987	Olivos		
International career
Years	Team	Apps	(Points)
1985-87	Argentina	3	(0)

Sergio Carossio (born 29 October 1962 in Buenos Aires) is a former Argentine rugby union player. He played as a lock. Currently he works as physiotherapist and kinesiologist. He is currently member of UAR's Medical Staff.

== Career ==
Always playing for Olivos Rugby Club from Vicente López as lock, Carossio had a brief international experience with the Argentina national team, debuting in Pumas on 2 November 1985, at Buenos Aires during the historic tie against the All Blacks, then, for two years he was not called up anymore, until during the 1987 Rugby World Cup he played the rest of his matches, against Italy and New Zealand. In total, he played 3 matches for Argentina.

With the medical studies left behind, after the player career, he started his activity as physio therapist and entered the Olivos' medical staff; since 1998, he is in the same charge also in the Argentina national rugby union team, along with the charge of kinesitherapist.
