= Kenyon Ziehl =

Zimbabwean sportsman

- Born: Kenyon Garth Baines Ziehl; January 11, 1963 (age 63) Rusape, South Rhodesia
- Notable relative: Kevin Curran (cousin)

Rugby union career
- Position: Fullback
International career
Years	Team	Apps	(Points)
198?-198?	Zimbabwe	12	((?))
- Cricket career

Cricket information
- Batting: Right-handed
- Bowling: Right-arm medium

Domestic team information
- Years: Team
- 1994/95–1995/96: Mashonaland Country Districts

Career statistics
Competition	First-class	List A
Matches	2	1
Runs scored	33	10
Batting average	8.25	10.00
100s/50s	0/0	0/0
Top score	15	10
Balls bowled	78	–
Wickets	1	–
Bowling average	29.00	–
5 wickets in innings	0	–
10 wickets in match	0	–
Best bowling	1/29	–
Catches/stumpings	2/–	0/1
- Source: Cricinfo, 27 August 2025

Kenyon Garth Baines Ziehl (born 11 January 1963) is a Zimbabwean former rugby union player and cricketer.

== Cricket career ==
Ziehl played two first-class and one List A matches for Mashonaland Country Districts. Although he never played at international level with Zimbabwe, he played for Zimbabwe A.

== Rugby union career ==
Ziehl also played rugby union for Zimbabwe, being part of the 1987 Rugby World Cup squad, although he did not play any of the three pool stage matches in the tournament.

== After career ==
Since 2009, Zhiel is a franchise administrator for Mid West Rhinos. As of 2015, he was appointed national selection convenor by Zimbabwe Cricket, replacing Givemore Makoni.

In February 2020, he was named in Zimbabwe's squad for the Over-50s Cricket World Cup in South Africa. However, the tournament was cancelled during the third round of matches due to the coronavirus pandemic.
