= José Mostany =

Argentine rugby union player (born 1963)

- Born: José Antonio Mostany; January 13, 1963 (age 63) Argentina

Rugby union career
- Position: Flanker
Senior career
Years	Team	Apps	(Points)
1986–1987	Club Manuel Belgrano		
International career
Years	Team	Apps	(Points)
1987	Argentina	3	(0)

José Antonio "Pepe" Mostany (born 13 January 1963), is an Argentinian former rugby union player. He was the first Club Manuel Belgrano player to play for the Pumas.

== Career ==
Mostany played for Club Manuel Belgrano in the Nacional de Clubes and had three caps in the 1987 Rugby World Cup, playing all the three pool stage matches, with the tournament being his only time where he played for the Argentine national team.
