= Adrian Tinca =

Romanian rugby union player and coach

- Born: Adrian Aurelian Tinca; January 9, 1967 (age 59) Constanța, Romania
- Died: March 1, 2017 (aged 50) Castres, France
- Height: 178 cm (5 ft 10 in)
- Weight: 76 kg (168 lb)

Rugby union career
- Position: Centre
Youth career
- 1979–1986: Clubul Sportiv Școlar nr. 2 Constanța
Senior career
Years	Team	Apps	(Points)
1986–1987	Steaua București		
1987–1997	Farul Constanța		
International career
Years	Team	Apps	(Points)
1987	Romania	2	(0)
Coaching career
- Years: Team
- 2002–2004: Farul Constanța
- 2004–2010: RC Cleopatra
- 2014–2016: RC Tomitanii Constanța

Adrian Tinca (Constanta 9 January 1967 – Castres, 1 March 2017) was a Romanian former rugby union player and coach. He played as centre.

== Career ==
Tinca debuted for Clubul Sportiv Școlar nr. 2 Constanța in 1979, where he played until 1986, when he moved to Steaua for a year in the championship. The following year, he moved to Farul Constanța, where he would play for the rest of his career until 1999, when he retired. He had his first cap for Romania in 1987, with his only caps were in two tests against France and Soviet Union. Tinca was also part of the Romania squad which took part at the 1987 Rugby World Cup, although he did not take part in the tournament. Years after his retirement, Tinca coached his former team, Farul Constanța between 2002 and 2004, later coaching two amateur teams from Constanța, RC Cleopatra between 2004 and 2010 and RC Tomitanii Constanța, between 2010 and 2016.

== Death ==
On 1 March 2017, at the age of 50, Tinca died of a heart attack while travelling to Castres with the Under-16 team he coached to play two test matches against Castres and Quillan.

== Honours ==
Clubul Sportiv Școlar nr. 2 Constanța

National Junior championship: 1985

Farul Constanța

- Cupa României: 1994-95 and 1996–97
