= Flippie van der Merwe =

South African rugby union footballer

- Born: Philip Rudolph van der Merwe; 8 July 1957 (age 69) Dibeng, Northern Cape, South Africa
- Height: 1.96 m (6 ft 5 in)
- Weight: 133 kg (293 lb)
- School: Diamantveld High School, Kimberley
- University: Stellenbosch University

Rugby union career
- Position: Tighthead prop
Provincial / State sides
Years	Team	Apps	(Points)
1977–1980	Western Province	22	
1981	South Western Districts		
1982–1984	Free State	46	
1985–	Western Transvaal	43	
1989	Griqualand West		
International career
Years	Team	Apps	(Points)
1981–1989	South Africa	6	

Philip "Flippie" Rudolph van der Merwe (born 8 July 1957 in Dibeng, Northern Cape Province) is a South African former rugby union player who played six test matches for the South Africa national rugby union team from 1981 to 1989.

== Playing career ==
Van der Merwe made his provincial debut for WP in 1977 while a student at Stellenbosch University. He was selected on the replacement bench for the Springboks in the first tests against the touring British Lions in 1980. Van der Merwe made his test debut in 1981 against New Zealand on 29 August 1981 at Athletic Park in Wellington. He played his last test match for the Springboks, eight years later, against the World XV at Newlands. Van der Merwe also played in six tour matches for the Springboks.

In 1986, van der Merwe was selected to represent the Overseas Unions XV against the Five Nations XV in a match played at Twickenham Stadium to commemorate the centenary of the International Rugby Football Board.

=== Test history ===
No.	Opposition	Result (SA 1st)	Position	Tries	Date	Venue
1.	New Zealand	24–12	Tighthead prop		29 Aug 1981	Athletic Park, Wellington
2.	New Zealand	22–25	Tighthead prop		12 Sep 1981	Eden Park, Auckland
3.	United States	38–7	Tighthead prop		20 Sep 1981	Owl Creek Polo ground, Glenville, New York
4.	New Zealand Cavaliers	21–15	Tighthead prop		10 May 1986	Newlands, Cape Town
5.	New Zealand Cavaliers	18–19	Tighthead prop		17 May 1986	Kings Park, Durban
6.	World XV	20–19	Tighthead prop		26 Aug 1989	Newlands, Cape Town

== Personal ==
Van der Merwe is the father of François van der Merwe, a professional rugby player and Flip van der Merwe, also a former professional rugby player and Springbok.

== See also ==
- List of South Africa national rugby union players – Springbok no. 526
