= Héctor Silva (rugby union) =

Argentine rugby union footballer (1945–2021)

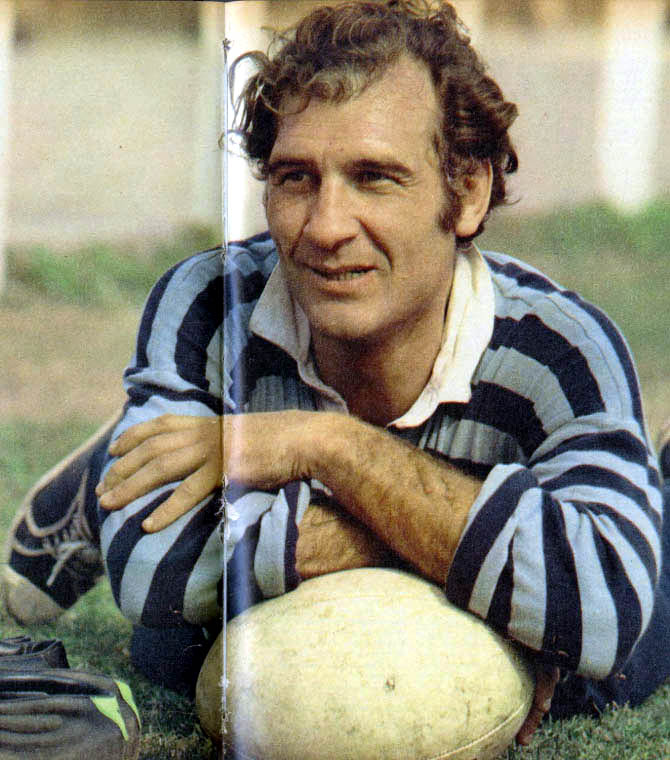
- Silva in 1978
- Born: Héctor Luis Silva; 1 July 1945 La Plata, Argentina
- Died: 17 May 2021 (aged 75) La Plata, Argentina

Rugby union career
- Position: Number 8
Senior career
Years	Team	Apps	(Points)
1965–1980	Los Tilos		
International career
Years	Team	Apps	(Points)
1965–1980	Argentina	24	(16)
1980	South American Jaguars	1	(0)
Coaching career
- Years: Team
- 1983–1985: Los Tilos
- 1985–1987: Argentina

Héctor Luis Silva (1 July 1945 – 17 May 2021) was an Argentine rugby union footballer and coach, who coached Argentina in the 1987 Rugby World Cup.

== Biography ==
Between 14 and 18 years, he played rugby and basketball; he practiced rugby in the youth team of his city, Rugby Club Los Tilos from La Plata, and at 18 years he was in the first team; at 20 years, in 1965, he debuted for Argentina in a test match against the Junior Springboks in South Africa, during a tour which saw 11 wins in 16 matches.

Becoming captain for Argentina in 1967, he was excluded from the national team in 1971 due to Silva accepting to appear in a television advertisement; even if he was not formally suspended, he was not called up until 1977.

In 1980, he was part of the South America XV which took part in South Africa and ended his international career in August against a World XV in Buenos Aires.

Three years later he took the lead of Tilos and later he was called to coach Argentina national team alongside Ángel Guastella; the coaches were sacked after Argentina failed to make the knock-out stage in the 1987 Rugby World Cup.

He continued his coaching activity parallel to his role in the public administration, and occasionally he collaborated as sports consultant and commentator for press headlines.

== Death ==
Héctor Silva died on 17 May 2021, aged 75 or 76, from COVID-19 at a hospital in La Plata, where he was admitted two weeks prior.
