= Marcelo Campo =

Argentine rugby union player (1957–2021)

- Born: 1 July 1957 Quilmes, Argentine
- Died: 26 June 2021 (aged 63) Punta del Este, Uruguay
- Height: 5 ft 11 in (1.80 m)
- Weight: 185 lb (84 kg; 13.2 st)
- Occupation(s): Teacher at St.George's College, Quilmes

Rugby union career
- Position: Wing
Amateur team(s)
Years	Team	Apps	(Points)
1975-1978	Old Georgians		
Senior career
Years	Team	Apps	(Points)
1979-1987	Pueyrredón		
International career
Years	Team	Apps	(Points)
1978-1987	Argentina	29	(63)
1980-1984	South American Jaguars	6	(4)

Marcelo Campo (1 July 1957 – 26 June 2021) was an Argentine rugby union player. He played as a wing.

== Career ==
Campo played for Old Georgians, from Quilmes. With said club, he was in the international rugby scene. The first time he wore Argentina's jersey was in a match against England XV at Twickenham, even if it was not formally a test match, which was in the second match, at Rovigo, against Italy, on 24 October 1978. However, that match at London, which ended 13-13, saw Campo going to the try line in such a spectacular manner. The event is remembered until the present day, as it was the first time that an Argentina national rugby union team played against an English counterpart, in away field. Although not having test value, Campo played other important international matches, two against a New Zealand XV in 1979 and others against a World XV in 1980 and 1983, which saw important international players such as Jacques Fouroux, Jean-Pierre Rives, David Campese and Pierre Berbizier. Meanwhile, in 1979, Campo moved to Pueyrredón, from Boulogne Sur Mer, in the Greater Buenos Aires due to the folding of Old Georgians in 1979. Campo won a South American championship in 1987 and was called up in the 1987 Rugby World Cup, where he played only a match, which was the last one of his international career. Later, Campo taught rugby at the St. George's College in Quilmes, the college from where Old Georgians came.

He died of a heart attack on 26 June 2021.
