= Steve Brain =

English rugby union player

Stephen Edward Brain (born 7 November 1954) is an English former rugby union player who played as a hooker for Coventry R.F.C. and represented England in over a dozen international matches, including three Five Nations, now the Six Nations Championship, between 1984 and 1986.

== International Appearances (England) ==
- 1984 v South Africa (Johannesburg) L 35–9
- 1984 v Australia (R) (Twickenham) L 19–3
- 1985 v Romania (Twickenham) W 22–15
- 1985 v France (Twickenham) D 9–9 (FN)
- 1985 v Scotland (Twickenham) W 10–7 (FN)
- 1985 v Ireland (Dublin) L 13–10 (FN)
- 1985 v Wales (Cardiff) L 24–15 (FN)
- 1985 v New Zealand (Christchurch) L 18–13
- 1985 v New Zealand (Wellington) L 42–15
- 1986 v Wales (Twickenham) W 21–18 (FN)
- 1986 v Scotland (Murrayfield) L 33–6 (FN)
- 1986 v Ireland (Twickenham) W 25–20 (FN)
- 1986 v France (Paris) L 29–10 (FN)

Career Record P13, W4, D1, L8 Test Points: 0

(R) = Replacement

== Club affiliations ==
- Coventry RFC
- Kenilworth RFC
- Moseley RFC
- Mystic River Rugby Club (US)
- Rugby Lions (England)
- Solihull R.F.C.
