= Soakai Motuʻapuaka =

Tongan rugby union player

- Born: Soakai Motuʻapuaka circa 1953 Kolofoʻou, Tonga
- School: New Zealand Police College, Porirua
- Occupation: Deputy Commissioner of Community Policing

Rugby union career
- Position: Prop
Senior career
Years	Team	Apps	(Points)
1979-1987	Police		
International career
Years	Team	Apps	(Points)
1979-1987	Tonga	3	(0)

Soakai Motuʻapuaka (born Teʻekiu, circa 1953) is a Tongan former rugby union prop and Deputy Commissioner of Community Policing of his country. He contributed to Tongan rugby union while on duty.

== Career ==
Motuʻapuaka was one of the key players in the Tonga Police Force first team in which at one stage he became captain. He debuted for Tonga against Fiji, in Suva, on 8 September 1979. He was also part of the 1987 Rugby World Cup Ikale Tahi squad trained by Prince Mailefihi, playing only the pool stage match against Canada, in Napier, which was his last cap for Tonga.

== Personal life ==
Motuʻapuaka joined the Tonga Police Force on 14 August 1978 after serving in the United States Army with a diploma. He started as a corporal before being promoted to sergeant in 1984. He was then promoted to Inspector of Police, Assistant Chief Inspector of Police, Chief Inspector, Assistant Superintendent and Assistant Police Commander, before being finally promoted to Deputy Commissioner of Community Policing in 2013. In 1994, he attended the New Zealand Police College in Porirua before his graduation as a police cadet. At the age of 60, Motuʻapuaka retired from police duty on 25 November 2013.
