= Éric Bonneval =

French rugby union player (born 1963)

- Born: 12 November 1963 (age 63) Toulouse, France
- Height: 1.80 m (5 ft 11 in)
- Weight: 83 kg (183 lb)

Rugby union career
- Position: Wing /Centre
Amateur team(s)
Years	Team	Apps	(Points)
- TOEC
–	Stade Toulousain		
–	US Colomiers		
–	Racing Club de France		
International career
Years	Team	Apps	(Points)
1984-1988	France	18	(32)

Éric Bonneval (born 12 November 1963 in Toulouse) is a former French rugby union player. He played as a Centre.

Eric Bonneval played for Stade Toulousain and Racing Club de France. His usual positions was Centre, although he started his career in France national rugby union team as a Wing. He earned his first national cap on 23 June 1984 against New Zealand at Auckland. He was called up for the 1987 Rugby World Cup, where France were runners-up to New Zealand.

== Honours ==
- French rugby champion, 1985, 1986 with Stade Toulousain
- Challenge Yves du Manoir, 1988 with Stade Toulousain
