= Marcus Rose =

England international rugby union player

- Born: William Marcus Henderson Rose; 12 January 1957 (age 69) Loughborough, Leicestershire, England
- School: Loughborough Grammar School
- University: Durham University; Magdalene College, Cambridge

Rugby union career
- Position: Full back
Senior career
Years	Team	Apps	(Points)
1975–1977	Leicester Tigers	19	(184)
1979–1981	Cambridge University		
1981–1983	Coventry		
International career
Years	Team	Apps	(Points)
1981-87	England	10	(82)

William Marcus Henderson Rose (born 12 January 1957) is a former rugby union international full back who gained ten caps for England between 1981 and 1987.

== Career ==
Rose made his debut in senior rugby while still at Loughborough Grammar School, his first appearance for Leicester Tigers came on 20 December 1975 against Bristol when he replaced club captain Robin Money who was injured, Rose played 7 times for Leicester in his first season scoring 70 points. He played the first 9 games of the next season before university began, and similarly played the first three games of the 1977/78 season, scoring five tries in what were his final matches for the club.

Rose was selected by Cambridge University for The Varsity Match in 1979, 1980, and 1981.

Rose made his England debut on 7 March 1981 against Ireland at Lansdowne Road, Rose scored a try and a conversion in a 10–6 win, but was unable to take up an offer of a place on England's 1981 England rugby union tour of Argentina as he could not defer his final university exams. Later in March that year Rose joined Coventry, where he stayed until October 1983.

On 4 April 1987 Rose scored 17 points as England beat Scotland to deny them a triple crown in the 1987 Five Nations Championship.

Rose provided colour commentary on the ESPN broadcast of the 1987 Rugby World Cup Final.
