= Samuela Vunivalu =

Fijian rugby union footballer

Samu Vunivalu
- Born: Samuela Bainikalou Vunivalu c. 1957 (age 68–69) Yavuna, Nadi, Fiji
- Height: 6 ft 2 in (1.88 m)
- Occupation(s): Government backbencher, Member of the Parliament of Fiji

Rugby union career
- Position: Flanker
Senior career
Years	Team	Apps	(Points)
-	Suva		
International career
Years	Team	Apps	(Points)
1987	Fiji	3	(0)

Hon. Samuela Bainikalou Vunivalu (born c. 1957 in Nadi) is a Fijian former rugby union footballer and current politician. He played as flanker.

== Career ==
Vunivalu debuted in the 1987 Rugby World Cup, against Argentina, at Hamilton, on 24 May. He debuted as substitute, replacing Peceli Gale. His last match for Fiji was against France, at Auckland, on 7 June. He played three matches in the World Cup, two as a substitute and one as starting member, which was against New Zealand at Christchurch.

== Coaching career ==
In 2010, Vunivalu coached the NRU-affiliated Mosi Rugby

== Political career ==
During the 2014 general election, Vunivalu was elected a Member of the Parliament of Fiji for FijiFirst. He was not selected by FijiFirst as a candidate for the 2018 election.
