= Killean, County Armagh =

Village in County Armagh, Northern Ireland

Coordinates: 54.1251°N 6.3385°W

Killean: Irish: Cillín
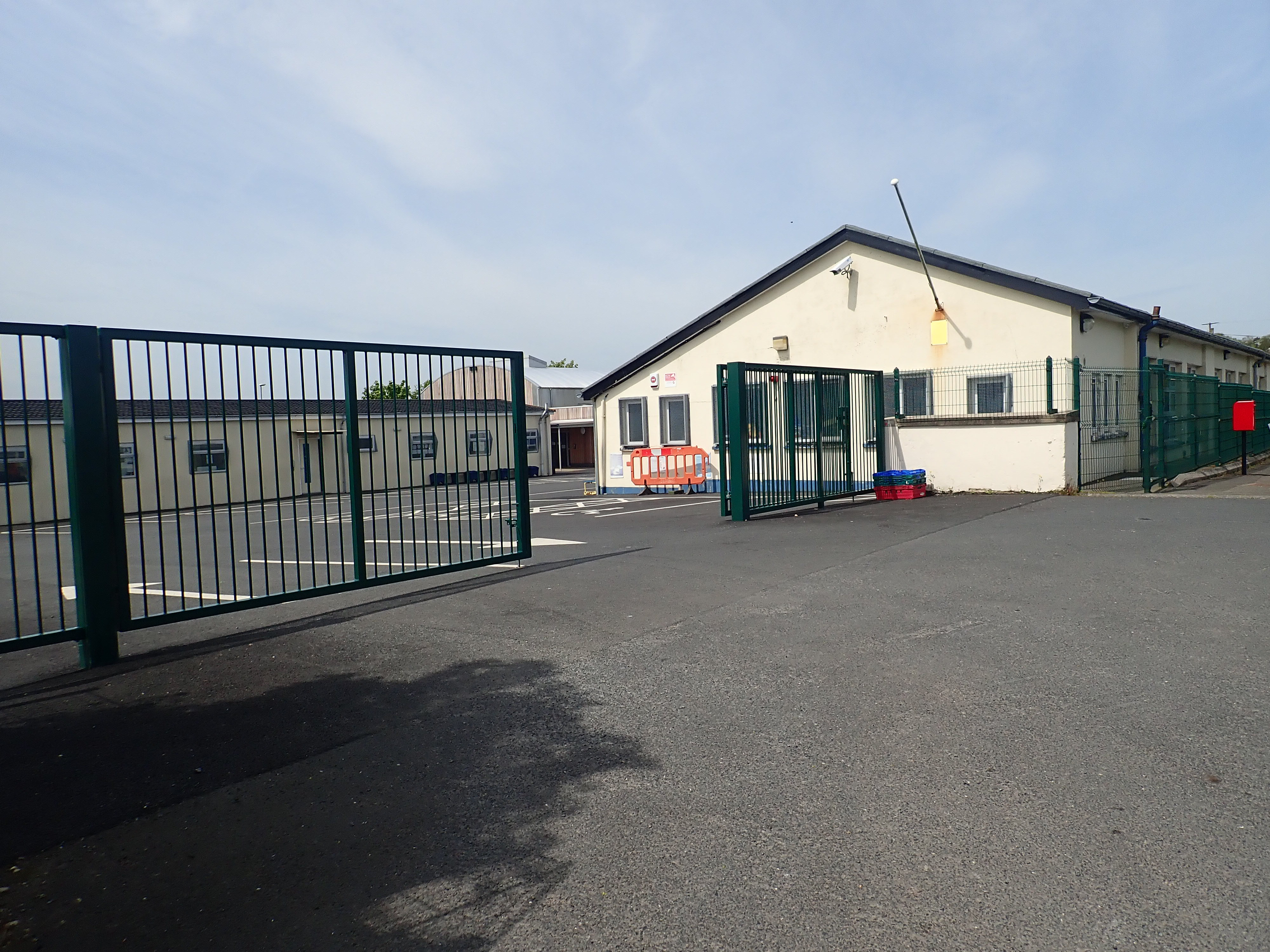
- Primary school in Killean

- Location within Northern Ireland
- Irish grid reference: J085265
  - Belfast: 38 mi (61 km)
  - Dublin: 67 mi (108 km)
- District: Newry, Mourne and Down
- County: County Armagh
- Country: Northern Ireland
- Sovereign state: United Kingdom
- Post town: NEWRY
- Postcode district: BT34, BT35
- Dialling code: 028
- UK Parliament: Newry and Armagh
- NI Assembly: Newry and Armagh

Killean (from Irish Cillín) or Killeen (Note: "Killeen" is the official name of the townland.) is a small village and townland in the civil parish of Killevy, County Armagh, Northern Ireland. It lies about four miles (6.5 km) south of Newry, near the border with County Louth in the Republic of Ireland. Killean is in the Newry, Mourne and Down District Council area.

== History ==
For more information, see The Troubles in Killean, which includes a list of incidents in the area during "the Troubles" resulting in two or more fatalities.

== Education ==
The sole school within the village is St Michael's Primary School, 29 Killean School Road.

== Places of worship ==
The primary place of worship in the village is St. Michael's Chapel, a Roman Catholic church.

== Natives ==
Máire Drumm, a vice-president of Sinn Féin from 1972 until her death in 1976, was from the village.
