= Guillermo Angaut =

Argentine rugby union player (born 1965)

- Born: Guillermo Pablo Angaut; 10 January 1965 (age 61) La Plata, Argentina
- Occupation: Ophthalmologist

Rugby union career
- Position: Fullback
Senior career
Years	Team	Apps	(Points)
1983-1999	La Plata Rugby Club		
International career
Years	Team	Apps	(Points)
1987-1991	Argentina	7	(0)

Guillermo Pablo Angaut (born 10 January 1965 in La Plata) is a former Argentine rugby union player. He played as a fullback. He is professionally an ophthalmologist. He is nicknamed "El Chino".

Angaut played all his career at La Plata Rugby Club, from 1983 to 1999. He won the Torneo de la URBA in 1995. He was La Plata captain from 1990 to 1996.

He had seven caps for Argentina, from 1987 to 1991, without ever scoring. He was called for the 1987 Rugby World Cup, where he had his first game for the "Pumas", in the 46-15 loss to New Zealand at 1 June 1987, in Wellington. The same year he won the 1987 South American Rugby Championship. His last game for Argentina came at the 1991 Rugby World Cup in a 35-12 loss to Samoa, on 13 October 1991, in Pontypridd, Wales. He was never called again for the national team.

His brothers are Alejandro Angaut and Patricio Angaut, both former rugby union players who played for La Plata Rugby Club alongside him, Patricio is currently the lead singer and guitarist of the rock band Dios Loko.
