= Club Pueyrredón =

Argentine sports club

(Argentina) Pueyrredón
- Full name: Club Pueyrredón
- Union: URBA
- Nickname: Puey
- Founded: 11 June 1953; 73 years ago
- Location: Benavídez, Argentina
- Ground: Benavídez
- President: Santiago Yanguela
- Coach: Julián Legora Héctor Butori
- League: Primera A
- 2026: 10th.
Team kit

Official website
- clubpueyrredon.com.ar

Club Pueyrredón is an Argentine sports club from the Benavídez district of Tigre Partido in Greater Buenos Aires. The rugby union senior squad currently plays in Primera División A, the second division of the Unión de Rugby de Buenos Aires (URBA) league system.

The field hockey team plays at Torneo Metropolitano organised by the Buenos Aires Hockey Association (AHBA), and since 2016 have their own artificial turf pitch. The club also has a children football section.

== History ==
In November 1942, Jorge Gutiérrez established "Club Colegial Juan Martín de Pueyrredón", which affiliated to Argentine Rugby Union one year later. The youth divisions of the club began to participate in the UAR competitions. The "Club de Rugby Pueyrredón" was founded on June 11, 1953, by Gutiérrez along with players Carlos Montero, Ángel Guastella, and Juan Carlos Saavedra. The name paid tribute to Juan Martín de Pueyrredón, an Argentine brigadier general from the 19th century. Pueyrredón's headquarters were located in Bolívar street of Buenos Aires.

In 1956, Pueyrredón won the Segunda División championship promoting to Primera División. The club also acquired a facility in Boulogne Sur Mer (San Isidro Partido). In 1961 the club inaugurated their rugby field in that city, after years of playing in lent grounds.

In 2010 Pueyrredón was relegated to the second division, along with Banco Nación.

Since 2015 the Institution has moved to Benavídez, where one year later they built the first field hockey pitch.

== Notable players ==
Some Pueyrredón's players were part of the successful 1965 tour of Rhodesia and South Africa that meant the birth of the Argentina's nickname (Pumas), which has identified the national team since then.

Players included Ángel Guastella (as coach), Eduardo Scharenberg, and Guillermo Illia.
