= Polutele Tuʻihalamaka =

Tongan rugby union player

- Born: September 7, 1949 (age 77)

Rugby union career
- Position: Lock
International career
Years	Team	Apps	(Points)
1972-1987	Tonga	14	(4)
Coaching career
- Years: Team
- 1999: Tonga

Polutele Tu'ihalamaka (born 10 September 1949) is a former Tongan rugby union footballer and a current coach.

He played for Tonga for 14 years, from 1972 to 1987, including an historical win over Australia, in 1973. He played at the 1987 Rugby World Cup.

He took office as coach of Tonga, in January 1999, and led the team to the 1999 Rugby World Cup finals, where they were eliminated in the 1st round.
