= Donal Lenihan =

British Lions & Ireland international rugby union player

- Born: Donal Gerard Lenihan; 12 September 1959 (age 67) Cork, Ireland
- Height: 1.95 m (6 ft 5 in)
- Weight: 108 kg (17.0 st; 238 lb)
- School: Saint Patrick’s; Christian Brothers College
- University: University College Cork

Rugby union career
- Position: Lock
Amateur team(s)
Years	Team	Apps	(Points)
- UCC
–	Cork Constitution		
Senior career
Years	Team	Apps	(Points)
	Munster	50+	
International career
Years	Team	Apps	(Points)
1981–1992	Ireland	52	(4)
1983–1989	British and Irish Lions		

Donal Gerard Lenihan (born 12 September 1959) is a retired Irish rugby union player and manager.

== Early life, family and education ==
Lenihan was raised in a sporting background. His father, Gerald Lenihan, was an All-Ireland heavyweight boxing champion and Gaelic footballer of distinction, and played in the same team as Jack Lynch. Donal attended primary school he attended Saint Patrick’s on Gardiner's Hill and afterwards went to Christian Brothers College, Cork. He captained his school to Munster Junior and Senior Schools titles and also captained Irish schools. He was a student at UCC and played for the rugby team while studying there.

== Rugby career ==
=== Player ===
Lenihan played his first test match for Ireland on 21 November 1981 versus Australia at the age of 22. Famous for his aerial skills in the line-out, the second row was ever present in the Irish team for over a decade which saw two Triple Crowns and three Five Nations Championship victories. It was his break off the back of a line-out that set up Mike Kiernan's championship clinching drop-goal against England in 1985.

Lenihan played four matches in the inaugural 1987 Rugby World Cup where he was the Irish captain and played three matches in the 1991 Rugby World Cup. The Munsterman captained his country 17 times (3rd highest of the amateur era, 7th all-time). He was selected for three British and Irish Lions tours - 1983, 1986 (IRB Centenary Match), 1989 - and captained the Lions on a number of occasions during their victorious tour of 1989. His 52nd and last Irish cap (6th highest of the amateur era) came against Wales on 18 January 1992.

=== Manager ===
After retirement from playing rugby, he took over as manager of Ireland in 1998, alongside coach Warren Gatland. He stepped down as manager at the end of the 2000 season to take over management of the British and Irish Lions for their 2001 tour to Australia with coach Sir Graham Henry.

== Later career ==
Lenihan appears regularly as a commentator on TV and radio for rugby matches and writes for the Irish Examiner newspaper. He also works as a financial consultant in Cork.

== Honours ==
Lenihan was inducted into the Munster Rugby Hall of Fame in April 2019. He was inducted into the Rugby Writers of Ireland Hall of Fame in November 2013. He was adjudged Irish rugby’s ‘Player of the Decade’ for the 1980s by the Irish Times. Lenihan was elected President of Cork Constitution Rugby Club for 2020–21.

=== University College Cork R.F.C. ===
- Munster Senior Cup
  - Winner: 1980–81

=== Cork Constitution ===
- Munster Senior Cup
  - Winner (3): 1982–83, 1984–85, 1988–89

=== Ireland ===
- Five Nations Championship
  - Winner (3): 1982, 1983, 1985
- Triple Crown
  - Winner (2): 1982, 1985

=== British and Irish Lions ===
- British and Irish Lions tours
  - Tourist (2): 1983, 1989
  - IRB Centenary Match: 1986
  - Manager: 2001
