= Gabriel Travaglini =

Argentine rugby union player (born 1958)

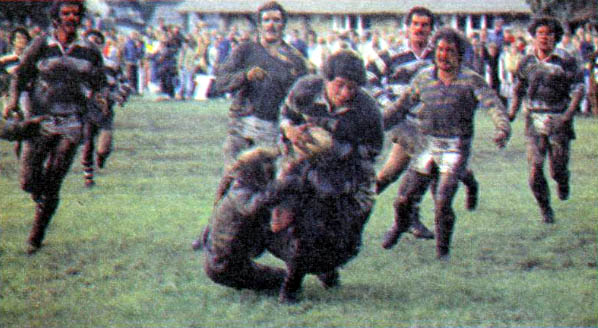
- Travaglini scores a try for CA San Isidro against Hindú Club
- Born: Gabriel Travaglini; February 14, 1958 (age 68) Buenos Aires, Argentina
- Notable relative: Adolfo Travaglini (grandfather)

Rugby union career
- Position: Number 8
Senior career
Years	Team	Apps	(Points)
1977–1989	Club Atlético San Isidro		
International career
Years	Team	Apps	(Points)
1978–1987	Argentina	19	(28)
1980	South America XV	4	(4)

Gabriel Travaglini (born in Buenos Aires, 14 February 1958) is an Argentine retired rugby union player. He played as number 8. He played for CASI for all of his entire career. As of April 2022, he is the chairman of Unión Argentina de Rugby.

== Career ==
Travaglini debuted with Club Atlético San Isidro against Banco Nación, in September 1977, playing as lock. Between 1980 and 1986, Travaglini was the captain for CASI. His first match for Argentina was against Italy, on 24 October 1978. He was also part of the 1987 Rugby World Cup Pumas roster, playing all the three matches, ending his international career in the pool stage match against the All Blacks. Between 2013 and 2015, he was CASI's chairman, as well as the chairman of Unión de Rugby de Buenos Aires (URBA). In April 2022, Travaglini became chairman of UAR, being the first from URBA since 2009 and the one who played most matches for the Pumas in the history. He also became the first chairman to have played a Rugby World Cup.
