= Jeff Whitefoot (rugby union) =

British Lions & Wales international rugby union footballer (born 1956)

- Born: Jeffrey Whitefoot; 18 April 1956 (age 70) Bedwas, Wales

Rugby union career
Amateur team(s)
Years	Team	Apps	(Points)
- Neath RFC
1978-1991	Cardiff RFC	305	(36)
International career
Years	Team	Apps	(Points)
1987	Wales	19	(0)

Jeffrey Whitefoot (born 18 April 1956) is a former Wales international rugby union player. Whitefoot played his club rugby for Bedwas and Cardiff and attained 19 international caps. He also made an appearance for the British & Irish Lions against a Rest of the World XV in 1986 and Finally received his Lions cap 32 years later. The presentation took place at Mr Whitefoot's home in Energlyn, Caerphilly after family and friends organised a surprise party – they had to hide the cap for several weeks when it arrived in the post. Jeff also played for a Five Nations XV versus the Overseas Unions in the same year.
