= David Irwin (rugby union) =

Rugby union player from Northern Ireland

- Born: David George "Chumie" Irwin; 1 February 1959 (age 67) Belfast, Northern Ireland
- Height: 1.85 m (6 ft 1 in)
- Weight: 76 kg (168 lb)
- School: Royal Belfast Academical Institution
- University: Queen's University, Belfast

Rugby union career
- Position: Centre
Senior career
Years	Team	Apps	(Points)
–	Queen's University RFC		
–	Instonians		
–	Ulster		
International career
Years	Team	Apps	(Points)
1980-1990	Ireland	25	(8)
1983	British and Irish Lions	3	

David George Irwin (born 1 February 1959) is a Northern Irish former rugby union player who played for Ireland and the British Lions.

== Ireland ==
Between 1980 and 1990, Irwin made 25 appearances for Ireland, scoring 8 points including 2 tries. Helped Ireland win the 1982 Five Nations Championship and a Triple Crown.

== British Lions ==
In 1983, Irwin was also a member of the Lions squad that went on tour to New Zealand.

Irwin was the victim of a Provisional IRA car bomb in 1987.

== Later years ==
Irwin is currently the medical coordinator for Ulster Rugby, as well as being a practising GP in Belfast.
