= 1990–1992 FIRA Trophy =

European rugby union championship

1990-92 FIRA Trophy
- Date: 30 September 1990 – 28 May 1992
- Countries: France; Italy; Romania; Soviet Union/CIS; Spain

Tournament statistics
- Champions: France
- Matches played: 20

The 1990–92 FIRA Trophy was the 29th edition of a European rugby union championship for national teams. The format returned to a two-year tournament.

The tournament was won by France, with a Grand Slam. Italy, improving their competitive performance, finished in 2nd place, while Romania where 3rd. Both teams qualified for the 1991 Rugby World Cup, since the first two games also were valid for the qualification, while Soviet Union missed them. This would be their last presence at the FIRA Trophy, since the country ceased to exist on 25 December 1991. They were replaced by the CIS for the final two games. Spain failed the 1991 Rugby World Cup qualification because of her two losses in the opening games, had a narrow defeat to Italy (22-21), and a win over Romania (6-0), both at home, but wasn't able to avoid the 5th and last place, and were relegated.

The winners of the Second Division pools were Germany and Morocco.

== First division ==
	FRA	ITA	ROU	URS	ESP
France	––––	21-18	25-6	38-12	53-4
Italy	9-15	––––	39-13	34-12	30-6
Romania	21-33	18-21	––––	34-6	19-6
Soviet Union- CIS	15-36	3-21	3-10	––––	30-3
Spain	24-60	21-22	6-0	16-19	––––

Due to Dissolution of the Soviet Union, the Soviet Union was replaced by the Commonwealth of Independent States.

Place	Nation	Games				Points			Table points
Place	Nation	played	won	drawn	lost	for	against	diff.	Table points
1	France	8	8	0	0	281	109	+172	24
2	Italy	8	6	0	2	194	109	+85	20
3	Romania	8	3	0	5	121	139	-18	14
4	Soviet Union/CIS	8	2	0	6	100	192	-92	12
5	Spain	8	1	0	7	86	233	-147	10

Point system: try 4 pt, conversion: 2 pt., penalty kick 3 pt. drop 3 pt
Click "show" for more info about match (scorers, line-up etc.)

30 September 1990	Italy	30 - 6	Spain	Stadio Comunale Mario Battaglini, Rovigo
	Try: Giovanelli, Venturi; Con: Troiani (2); Pen: Troiani (5); Drop: Bonomi		Pen: Díaz, Puertas	Referee: (England) Ian Bullerwell
Italy: 15.Luigi Troiani, 14.Edgardo Venturi, 13.Stefano Barba, 12.Fabio Gaetaniello, 11.Massimo Brunello, 10.Massimo Bonomi, 9.Umberto Casellato, 8.Massimo Giovanelli, 7.Gianni Zanon (cap.), 6.Roberto Saetti, 5.Carlo Checchinato, 4.Giambattista Croci, 3.Franco Properzi, 2.Giancarlo Pivetta, 1.Massimo Cuttitta				Referee: (England) Ian Bullerwell
Spain: 15.Francisco Puertas, 14.Daniel Saenz, 13.Jon Azkargorta, 12.Javier Torres, 11.Salvador Torres, 10.Jorge Moreno de Alborán, 9. Javier Díaz Paternain, 8.José Antonio Egido, 7.Alberto Malo, 6.Jaime Gutierrez, 5.Javier Chocarro, 4.Javier Amunarriz, 3.Asier Aktba, 2.Santiago Santos, 1.Julio Álvarez

3 October 1990

Romania	19 - 6	Spain
Try: Dumitras, Răcean; Con: Nichitean; Pen: Nichitean (2); Drop: Ignat		Pen: Puertas Soto (2)

Stadio Plebiscito, Padua
Attendance: 4,000
Referee: (Scotland) B. Anderson

21 October 1990

Soviet Union	3 - 10	Romania
Pen: Dzagnidze		Try: Neaga; Pen: Răcean; Drop: Nichitean

Fili Stadium, Moscow
Referee: (France) R. Hourquet

24 November 1990	Italy	34 - 12	Soviet Union	Stadio Comunale Mario Battaglini, Rovigo
	Try: Brunello, Croci; Mas. Cutitta, Francescato; Con: Troiani (3); Pen: Troiani (4)		Con: Gamozkin (2)	Referee: (Romania) Hustiu
Italy: 15.Luigi Troiani, 14.Edgardo Venturi, 13.Stefano Bordon, 12.Stefano Barba, 11.Massimo Brunello, 10.Massimo Bonomi, 9.Ivan Francescato, 8.Massimo Giovanelli (69'Gustavo Milano), 7.Gianni Zanon(cap.), 6.Roberto Saetti, 5.Giambattista Croci, 4.Roberto Favaro, 3.Antonio Piazza, 2.Giancarlo Pivetta, 1.Massimo Cuttitta				Referee: (Romania) Hustiu
Soviet Union: 15.Dzagnidze, 14.Voropaev, 13.Diatlov, 12. Gamoskin, 11.Kuperman, 10.Nicolaev (49'Kovalenko), 9. Frantzov, 8.Ovisanick, 7.Uambaev, 6.Mosiokov, 5. Stelmalkovic, 4.Ganyakin, 3.Molchanov, 2.Malikov (58'Marcenko) 1. Koklov (74'Barisov)

2 March 1991	Italy	9 - 15	France A1	Stadio Flaminio, Rome
	Try: Marc. Cuttitta; Con: Troiani; Pen: Troiani		Try: Berty, Dal Maso; Con: Pouyau (2); Pen: Berot	Referee: (England) S. W. Griffiths
Italy : 15.Luigi Troiani, 14.Edgardo Venturi, 13.Stefano Barba, 12.Diego Dominguez, 11.Marcello Cuttitta, 10.Massimo Bonomi, 9.Ivan Francescato, 8.Corrado Covi (cap.), 7.Pierpaolo Pedroni, 6.Massimo Giovanelli, 5.Giambattista Croci, 4.Roberto Favaro, 3.Franco Properzi, 2.Giancarlo Pivetta, 1.Massimo Cuttitta				Referee: (England) S. W. Griffiths
France :15.Philippe Berot 14.David Berty, 13.Jean-Claude Langlade, 12.Éric Blanc, 11.Peyo Hontas, 10.Didier Pouyau, 9.Aubin Hueber, 8.Abdelatif Benazzi, 7.Philippe Benetton, 6.Éric Champ, 5.Jean Condom, 4.Thierry Devergie, 3.Philippe Gallart, 2.Marc Dal Maso, 1.Éric Alabarbe (56' Marc Pujolle)

17 March 1991

France A1	38 - 12	Soviet Union

Stade de Kerolay, Lorient

21 April 1991	Romania	18 - 21	Italy	Stadionul Dinamo, Bucharest
	Try: Sasu; Con: Ignat; Pen: Ignat 2 Drop: Nichitean 2		Try: Pivetta, Venturi; Con: Troiani 2 Pen: Troiani 3	Referee: (France) Yves Peyrelongue
Romania: 15.Gelu Ignat, 14.S. Chirila, 13.Adrian Lungu, 12.George Sava, 11.Catalin Sasu, 10.Neculai Nichitean, 9.Daniel Neaga, 8.Ioan Doja, 7.Haralambie Dumitras, 6.Gheorghe Dinu, 5.Constantin Cojocariu, 4.Sandu Ciorascu, 3.George Dumitrescu, 2.Gheorghe Ion, 1.Gheorghe Leonte, - Raplacements: Laurentiu Constantin, Constantin Stan				Referee: (France) Yves Peyrelongue
Italy:15.Luigi Troiani, 14.Edgardo Venturi, 13.Stefano Barba, 12.Diego Dominguez, 11.Marcello Cuttitta, 10.Massimo Bonomi, 9.Ivan Francescato, 8.Massimo Giovanelli, 7.Corrado Covi, 6.Roberto Saetti, 5.Giambattista Croci, 4.Roberto Favaro, 3.Guido Rossi, 2.Giancarlo Pivetta, 1.Giovanni Grespan, - Raplacements: Pierpaolo Pedroni

28 April 1991

Spain	24 - 60	France XV

Ciudad Universitaria, Madrid

11 May 1991

Soviet Union	30 - 3	Spain
Try: Mironov, Kuperman, Ovsianik, Zakarlyuk, Sorokin; Con: Gamoskin (2); Pen: Gamoskin; Drop: Boldakov		Pen: Moreno de la Viuda

Fili Stadium Moscow

22 June 1991	Romania	21 - 33	France	Stadionul Dinamo, Bucharest
	Try: Dumitras; Con: Nichitean; Pen: Nichitean (5); Cards: C.Cojocariu (red card)		Try: Blanco, Camberabero, Cécillon, Simon; Con: Camberabero; Pen: Camberabero (5)	Attendance: 3,000; Referee: (England) Ed Morrison
Romania : 15.Marian Dumitru, 14.Catalin Sasu, 13.George Sava, 12.Adrian Lungu, 11.Nicolae Răcean, 10.Neculai Nichitean, 9.Daniel Neaga, 8.Haralambie Dumitras (cap), 7.O. Sugar, 6.Vasile Doja, 5.Constantin Cojocariu, 4.Laurentiu Constantin, 3.George Dumitrescu, 2.Gheorghe Ion, 1.Gheorghe Leonte, - Raplacements: Valere Tufa, Constantin Stan				Attendance: 3,000; Referee: (England) Ed Morrison
France :15.Serge Blanco (cap), 14.Peyo Hontas, 13.Franck Mesnel, 12.Philippe Sella, 11.Jean-Baptiste Lafond, 10.Didier Camberabero, 9.Fabien Galthié, 8.Marc Cecillon, 7.Michel Courtiols, 6.Eric Champ, 5.Olivier Roumat, 4.Jean-Marie Cadieu, 3.Philippe Gimbert, 2.Vincent Moscato, 1.Serge Simon,

3 November 1991	Soviet Union	3 - 21	Italy	Fili Stadium, Moscow
	Pen: Boldakov		Try: Mar. Cuttitta (2), Pivetta, Venturi; Con: Domínguez; Pen: Domínguez	Attendance: 3,000; Referee: (Belgium) Roelands
Soviet Union :15.Zakarluk, 14.Roxanov, 13.Sorokin, 12.Primacenko, 11.Gamozkin, 10. Kuperman, 9.Boldakov, 8.Galiakin, 7.Negodin, 6.Molkianov, 5.Kalasmikov, 4.Klinenko, 3.Ogrizkov, 2. Zikov, 1. Molchanov				Attendance: 3,000; Referee: (Belgium) Roelands
Italy: 15.Paolo Vaccari, 14.Edgardo Venturi, 13.Stefano Barba, 12.Diego Dominguez, 11.Marcello Cuttitta, 10.Massimo Bonomi, 9.Ivan Francescato, 8.Massimo Giovanelli, 7.Carlo Checchinato, 6.Alessandro Bottacchiari, 5.Giambattista Croci, 4.Roberto Favaro, 3.Giovanni Grespan, 2.Giancarlo Pivetta, 1.Massimo Cuttitta, - Raplacements: Stefano Bordon

17 November 1991

Spain	16 - 19	Soviet Union
Try: Castro Briones, Gutíerrez Merelles; Con: Blanco Duelo; Pen: Blanco Duelo (2)		Try: Kovalenco, Zakarlyuk, Negodin; Con: Nikolaev (2); Pen: Nikolaev

Polideportivo San Pablo, Seville

9 February 1992	Spain	21 - 22	Italy	Campo Universitario, Madrid
	Try: Altuna Izaguirre, Cecilia Simon (2), Etxeberria Landazabal; Con: Sanchez Gonzalez-Bermudo; Pen: Sanchez Gonzalez-Bermudo		Try: Mar. Cuttitta, Troiani, Venturi; Con: Domínguez (2); Pen: Domínguez; Drop: Domínguez	Referee: (France) Caulet
Spain: 15.Francisco Puertas, 14.Onésimo Garcia, 13.Jon Azkargorta, 12.Gabriel Rivero, 11.Eduardo Cecilia, 10.Miguel Sanchez Gonzalez-Bermudo, 9.Javier Diaz, 8.Emilio Illaregui, 7.Jaime Gutiérrez, 6.Jon Etxeberria, 5.Alberto Malo, 4.Mario Auzmendi, 3.Asier Altuna, 2.Santiago Santos, 1.Julio Álvarez - Replacements: Joan Lluis Ros				Referee: (France) Caulet
Italy 15.Paolo Vaccari, 14.Edgardo Venturi, 13.Stefano Barba, 12.Diego Dominguez, 11.Marcello Cuttitta, 10.Luigi Troiani, 9.Francesco Pietrosanti, 8.Massimo Giovanelli, 7.Carlo Checchinato, 6.Alessandro Bottacchiari, 5.Giambattista Croci, 4.Roberto Favaro, 3.Franco Properzi, 2.Giancarlo Pivetta (cap), 1.Massimo Cuttitta

16 February 1992	France Espoirs	21 - 18	Italy	Stade Maurice Trélut, Tarbes
	Try: Deslandes, Bernat-Salles; Con: Reigt 2 Pen: Pouyau, Reigt; Ougier		Try: S. Barba, Bottacchiari; Con: Dominguez 2 Pen: Dominguez 2	Referee: (Romania) Paraschivescu
France: 15. Stéphane Ougier, 14.Philippe Bernat-Salles, 13.Michel Marfaing, 12.Hervé Couffignal (37' Didier Faugeron), 11.Peyo Hontas, 10.Didier Pouyau (15' Christophe Reigt), 9.Segueir, 8.Louis Armary (69' Alain Teulé), 7.Jean-Pierre Genet, 6.Laurent Seigne, 5.Jean-François Gourragne, 4.Hugues Miorin, 3.Courttiols, 2.Philippe Chamayou, 1.Christophe Deslandes				Referee: (Romania) Paraschivescu
Italy 15.Luigi Troiani, 14.Paolo Vaccari (63' Edgardo Venturi), 13.Stefano Barba, 12.Stefano Bordon, 11.Marcello Cuttitta, 10.Diego Dominguez, 9.Francesco Pietrosanti, 8.Massimo Giovanelli, 7.Carlo Checchinato, 6.Alessandro Bottacchiari, 5.Giambattista Croci, 4.Roberto Favaro, 3.Franco Properzi, 2.Giancarlo Pivetta (cap), 1.Massimo Cuttitta

22 March 1992

France A1	53 - 4	Spain

Stade Aimé Giral, Perpignan

4 April 1992

Spain	6 - 0	Romania
Pen: Nuñez Doval (2)

Campo Universitario, Madrid
Referee: (Belgium) D. Roelands

18 April 1992	Italy	39 - 13	Romania	Stadio Comunale Mario Battaglini, Rovigo
	Try: Mar. Cuttitta 2, Pietrosanti 2 Con: Dominguez 4 Pen: Dominguez 4 Drop: Dominguez		Try: Serban; Pen: Ignat 3	Referee: (France) M. Darroque
Italy: 15.Luigi Troiani, 14.Paolo Vaccari, 13.Stefano Barba, 12.Stefano Bordon, 11.Marcello Cuttitta, 10.Diego Dominguez, 9.Francesco Pietrosanti, 8.Roberto Saetti, 7.Walter Cristofoletto, 6.Alessandro Bottacchiari, 5.Daniele Sesenna, 4.Roberto Favaro, 3.Franco Properzi, 2.Giancarlo Pivetta (cap.), 1.Massimo Cuttitta, - Raplacements: Edgardo Venturi, Massimo Bonomi				Referee: (France) M. Darroque
Romania: 15.Nicolae Răcean, 14.Lucian Colceriu, 13.Adrian Lungu, 12.Nicolae Fulina, 11.B. Șerban, 10.Gelu Ignat, 9.Mihai Foca, 8.Ionuț Seceleanu, 7.Nicușor Marin, 6.Gheorghe Dinu, 5.Constantin Cojocariu, 4.Sandu Ciorăscu, 3.Viorel Ionescu, 2.Gheorghe Ion, 1.Constantin Stan, - Raplacements: I. Rațiu, Gabriel Vlad

10 May 1992

Romania	34 - 6	CIS

Stadionul Dinamo, Bucharest

28 May 1992	France	25 - 6	Romania	Stade Jules Deschaseaux, Le Havre
	Try: Cadieu, Galthié, Saint-André, Penalty try Con: Ougier (2), Viars; Pen: Viars		Pen: Răcean	Attendance: 4,935; Referee: (Scotland) Ken McCartney
France : 15.Stéphane Ougier, 14.Philippe Saint-André, 13.Michel Marfaing, 12.Christophe Deylaud, 11.Sébastien Viars, 10.Alain Penaud, 9.Fabien Galthié, 8.Marc Cécillon (cap), 7.Laurent Cabannes, 6.Jean-Francois Tordo, 5.Christophe Deslandes, 4.Jean-Marie Cadieu, 3.Philippe Gallart, 2.Jean-Pierre Genet, 1.Louis Armary, - Replacements: David Berty, Thierry Devergie				Attendance: 4,935; Referee: (Scotland) Ken McCartney
Romania : 15.Vasile Brici, 14.Marian Dumitru, 13.Adrian Lungu, 12.Nicolae Răcean, 11.Gheorghe Solomie, 10.Gelu Ignat, 9.Teodor Coman, 8.Haralambie Dumitras (cap), 7.Ionut Seceleanu, 6.Gheorghe Dinu, 5.Tudor Constantin, 4.Constantin Cojocariu, 3.Gabriel Vlad, 2.Gheorghe Ion, 1.Gheorghe Leonte

28 May 1992

CIS	15 - 36	France XV

Moscow

== Second division ==
=== Pool A ===
Place	Nation	Games				Points			Table points
Place	Nation	played	won	drawn	lost	for	against	diff.	Table points
1	Germany	6	4	1	1	46	33	+13	15
2	Poland	6	3	1	2	76	65	+11	13
3	Belgium	6	2	3	1	76	69	+7	13
4	Netherlands	6	0	1	5	45	76	-31	7

27 October 1990

Belgium	12 - 15	Poland

Liege

25 November 1990

Germany	7 - 7	Belgium

Rudolf-Kalweit-Stadion, Hanover

14 January 1991

Poland	24 - 9	Netherlands

Sopot

23 March 1991

Belgium	15 - 12	Netherlands

Brussels

28 April 1991

Netherlands	0 – 6	Germany

19 May 1991

Germany	6 - 0	Poland

Fritz-Grunebaum-Sportpark, Heidelberg

12 October 1991

Poland	16 - 16	Belgium

Lublin

3 November 1991

Poland	6 - 10	Germany

Gdańsk

23 November 1991

Netherlands	9 - 9	Belgium

's-Hertogenbosch

28 March 1992

Germany	7 - 3	Netherlands

Rudolf-Kalweit-Stadion, Hanover

11 April 1992

Belgium	17 - 10	Germany

Brussels

14 May 1992

Netherlands	12 - 15	Poland

Amsterdam

=== Pool B ===
Place	Nation	Games				Points			Table points
Place	Nation	played	won	drawn	lost	for	against	diff.	Table points
1	Morocco	6	5	0	1	98	54	+44	16
2	Portugal	6	4	0	2	117	66	+51	14
3	Tunisia	6	2	0	4	89	85	+4	10
4	Andorra	6	1	0	5	75	174	-99	8

9 March 1991

Andorra	9 - 25	Morocco

Andorra la Vella

23 March 1991

Portugal	33 - 15	Andorra

Coimbra

20 April 1991

Tunisia	16 - 10	Portugal

Tunis

4 May 1991

Andorra	16 - 14	Tunisia

Andorra la Vella

4 May 1991

Morocco	13 - 12	Portugal

Casablanca

9 November 1991

Tunisia	35 - 19	Andorra

Tunis

1991

Morocco	16 - 3	Tunisia

Casablanca

1991

Tunisia	5 - 6	Morocco

Tunis

28 March 1992

Andorra	6 - 29	Portugal

Andorra la Vella

11 April 1992

Portugal	15 - 0	Morocco

Lisbon

25 April 1992

Morocco	38 - 10	Andorra

Casablanca

26 April 1992

Portugal	18 - 16	Tunisia

Lisbon

== Third division ==
=== Pool 1 ===
(not completed due to the withdrawal of Yugoslavia)

11 November 1990

Bulgaria	3 - 0	Yugoslavia

withdraw

18 May 1991

Czechoslovakia	25 - 3	Bulgaria

Prague

21 April 1991

Yugoslavia	22 - 6	Czechoslovakia

Beograd

3 May 1992

Bulgaria	3 - 16	Czechoslovakia

Sofia

=== Pool 2 ===
- Semifinals

28 September 1991

Sweden	72 - 4	Finland

Karlstad

28 September 1991

Denmark	25 - 4	Norway

Karlskrona

- Third place final

29 September 1991

Finland	18 - 3	Norway

Karlskrona

- Final

29 September 1991

Sweden	30 - 9	Denmark

Karlstad

== Bibliography ==
- (in Italian) Francesco Volpe, Valerio Vecchiarelli (2000), 2000 Italia in Meta, Storia della nazionale italiana di rugby dagli albori al Sei Nazioni, GS Editore (2000) ISBN 88-87374-40-6.
- (in Italian) Francesco Volpe, Paolo Pacitti (Author), Rugby 2000, GTE Gruppo Editorale (1999).
