= 1992–1994 FIRA Trophy =

European rugby union championship

1992-94 FIRA Trophy
- Date: 1 October 1992 – 24 May 1994
- Countries: Belgium; France; Germany; Italy; Morocco; Portugal; Romania; Russia; Spain; Tunisia

Tournament statistics
- Champions: France
- Matches played: 41

The 1992–94 FIRA Trophy was the 30th edition of the European rugby union championship for national teams. The 1992-94 edition was arranged with a new format. Ten teams were admitted to the first division and divided into 2 pools to play a Preliminary Tournament which qualified five teams to play for the title in the 1993-1994 season.

== Preliminary Tournament ==
Five teams qualified to play in the pool for the "Title":

- France
- Italy
- Romania
- Russia
- Spain

And five in the pool for the "Plate":

- Belgium
- Germany
- Morocco
- Portugal
- Tunisia

== Pool for Title ==
Italy came close to winning their first tournament, beating a non-capped France A1 side for the first time by 16-9, but lost to Romania (26-12) away, and so France won the title on points difference, despite finishing with the same number of table points as the Italian and the Romanian sides. The French only awarded caps in their first game, a 51-0 win over the Romanians. Russia participated for the first time after the end of the Soviet Union, finishing in a disappointing 4th place, with a single win over Spain abroad (16-9).

Place	Nation	Games				Points			Table points
Place	Nation	played	won	drawn	lost	for	against	diff.	Table points
1	France	4	3	0	1	120	28	+92	10
2	Italy	4	3	0	1	120	69	+51	10
3	Romania	4	3	0	1	67	66	+1	10
4	Russia	4	1	0	3	44	80	-36	6
5	Spain	4	0	0	4	30	138	-108	4

Point system: try 5 pt, conversion: 2 pt., penalty kick 3 pt. drop 3 pt
Click "show" for more info about match (scorers, line-up etc)

17 October 1993	France	51 - 0	Romania	Parc Municipal, Brive-la-Gaillarde
	Try: Bernat-Salles 3 Loppy, Merle, Sella; Con: Lacroix 6 Pen: Lacroix 3			Attendance: 10,000; Referee: (Scotland) Jim Fleming
France: 15.Jean-Luc Sadourny, 14.Philippe Bernat-Salles, 13.Philippe Sella, 12.Thierry Lacroix, 11.David Berty, 10.Alain Penaud, 9.Aubin Hueber, 8.Marc Cécillon, 7.Léon Loppy, 6.Philippe Benetton, 5.Olivier Roumat (cap.), 4.Olivier Merle, 3.Stéphane Graou, 2.Jean-Michel Gonzalez, 1.Louis Armary - Replacement: Laurent Seigne, Olivier Campan				Attendance: 10,000; Referee: (Scotland) Jim Fleming
Romania:15.Gheorghe Solomie, 14.Adrian Mitorcariu, 13.Marius Nedelcu, 12.Nicolae Fulina, 11.Marian Dumitru, 10.F. Ion, 9.Mihai Foca, 8.Tiberiu Brinza, 7.Gheorghe Dinu, 6.Ionut Seceleanu, 5.Constantin Cojocariu, 4.Haralambie Dumitras (cap.), 3.Gabriel Vlad, 2.Gheorghe Ion, 1.Gheorghe Leonte - Replacement: 16.Adrian Girbu, 17.Micusor Marin

6 November 1993

Russia	19 - 30	Italy
Try: Bondarev; Con: Nikolayev; Pen: Nikolayev (4)		Try: Checchinato (2), Filizzola; Con: Domínguez (3); Pen: Domínguez (3)

Fili Stadium, Moscow
Referee: (France) G. Barrabes

11 November 1993

Italy	16 - 9	France A1
Try: penalty try Con: Domínguez; Pen: Domínguez (3)		Pen: Campan (3)

Stadio Comunale di Monigo, Treviso
Referee: (Romania) Mircea Paraschivescu

20 March 1994

France A1	49 - 3	Spain

Stade de Madrazès, Sarlat
Referee: (Italy) S. Faccioli

10 April 1994

Spain	9 - 16	Russia
Pen: Gorrotxategui Fernández (3)		Try: Mochnev; Con: Nikolayev; Pen: Nikolayev (3)

Campo Universitario, Madrid
Referee: R. Jacob

24 April 1994	Spain	3 - 11	Romania	La Romareda, Zaragoza
	Pen: Puertas Soto		Try: Solomie; Pen: Nichitean (2)	Referee: (France) Yves Peyrelongue

7 May 1994	Italy	62 - 15	Spain	Stadio Fratelli Cervi, Parma
	Try: Aldrovandi, Mar. Cuttitta; Francescato, Gardner; Pedroni, Ravazzolo; Vaccari 2 Con: Troiani 8 Pen: Troiani 2		Try: Puertas Soto, Ventura Miranda; Con: Puertas Soto; Pen: Puertas Soto	Referee: (France) Gérard Borreani
Italy 15.Piermassimiliano Dotto, 14.Paolo Vaccari, 13.Nicola Aldrovandi, 12.Gabriel Filizzola, 11.Marcello Cuttitta, 10.Luigi Troiani, 9.Ivan Francescato, 8.Carlo Checchinato, 7.Julian Gardner, 6.Claudio de Rossi, 5.Mark Giacheri, 4.Pierpaolo Pedroni, 3.Giovanni Grespan, 2.Carlo Orlandi, 1.Massimo Cuttitta (cap.) - replacements: Massimo Ravazzolo, Franco Properzi, Massimo Bonomi, Alessandro Troncon				Referee: (France) Gérard Borreani
Spain 15.Francisco Puertas Soto, 14.Daniel Saenz Lobsack, 13.Marc Ventura Miranda, 12.Álvar Enciso, 11.José Angel Hermosilla Olmos, 10.Unai Aurrekoetxea Arregui, 9.Jeronimo Hernandez-Gil Ruano, 8.Javier Lopez Martin, 7.Jaime Gutierrez Merelles, 6.Oscar Solano Sevilla, 5.Alberto Malo, 4.José Miguel Villaú, 3.Jonadab Diez Urkidi, 2.Javier Aguiar Cayetano, 1.Ignacio de Lazaro Bravo - replacements: Alberto Socías, Marcelo Mascaro Casaccio

7 May 1994

Romania	30 - 0	Russia
Try: Cioca (2), Colceriu, Leonte; Con: Nichitean (2); Pen: Nichitean (2)

Stadionul Dinamo, Bucharest
Referee: (England) B. Campsall

14 May 1994	Romania	26 - 12	Italy	Stadionul Dinamo, Bucharest
	Try: Leonte; Pen: Nichitean (5); Drop: Nichitean		Pen: Domínguez (4)	Attendance: 2,000; Referee: (France) D. Neynat
Romania 15.Vasile Brici, 14.Lucian Colceriu, 13.Nicolae Răcean, 12.Nicolae Fulina, 11.Robert Cioca, 10.Neculai Nichitean, 9.Daniel Neaga, 8.Andrei Gurănescu, 7.Traian Oroian, 6.Cătălin Drăguceanu, 5.Constantin Cojocariu, 4.Sandu Ciorăscu, 3.Gabriel Vlad, 2.Gheorghe Ion, 1.Gheorghe Leonte - replacements: Tiberiu Brînză, Marius Nedelcu				Attendance: 2,000; Referee: (France) D. Neynat
Italy 15.Javier Pértile, 14.Paolo Vaccari, 13.Stefano Bordon, 12.Massimo Bonomi, 11.Marcello Cuttitta, 10.Diego Dominguez, 9.Alessandro Troncon, 8.Carlo Checchinato, 7.Julian Gardner, 6.Massimo Giovanelli (cap.), 5.Mark Giacheri, 4.Pierpaolo Pedroni, 3.Franco Properzi, 2.Moreno Trevisiol, 1.Massimo Cuttitta - replacements: Massimo Ravazzolo . Coach: Georges Coste

28 May 1994

Russia	9 - 11	France A1

Fili Stadium, Moscow

== Pool for Sixth place ==
Place	Nation	Games				Points			Table points
Place	Nation	played	won	drawn	lost	for	against	diff.	Table points
1	Germany	4	3	0	1	93	67	26	10
2	Tunisia	4	2	1	1	59	63	-4	9
3	Belgium	4	2	1	1	60	70	-10	9
4	Morocco	4	2	0	2	77	78	-1	8
5	Portugal	4	0	0	4	57	68	-11	4

2 October 1993

Tunisia	15 - 6	Germany

Tunis

21 November 1993

Germany	32 - 16	Belgium

Heusenstamm

29 January 1994

Belgium	18 - 14	Morocco

Brussels

23 March 1994

Germany	35 - 18	Morocco

Hanover

9 April 1994

Belgium	10 - 8	Portugal

Liège

17 April 1994

Portugal	18 - 20	Germany

Lisbon

30 April 1994

Morocco	20 - 15	Portugal

Casablanca

4 May 1994

Morocco	25 - 10	Tunisia

Casablanca

7 May 1994

Portugal	16 - 18	Tunisia

Lisbon

14 May 1994

Tunisia	16 - 16	Belgium

Tunisia

== Second Division ==
=== Pool A ===
Place	Nation	Games				Points			Table points
Place	Nation	played	won	drawn	lost	for	against	diff.	Table points
1	Poland	8	7	0	1	154	81	+73	22
2	Netherlands	8	5	0	3	232	75	+157	18
3	Czech Republic	8	4	0	4	154	144	+10	16
4	Andorra	8	2	0	6	44	222	-178	12
5	Sweden	8	2	0	6	102	164	-62	11

26 October 1992

Poland	17 - 10	Sweden

Gdańsk

31 October 1992

Poland	25 - 8	Czechoslovakia

Bytom

15 November 1992

Czechoslovakia	21 - 16	Netherlands

Prague

28 November 1992

Netherlands	40 - 6	Andorra

Haarlem

2 May 1993

Netherlands	0 - 7	Poland

15 May 1993

Andorra	6 - 3	Czech Republic

Andorra la Vella

6 June 1993

Sweden	30 - 7	Czech Republic

Uppsala

17 April 1993

Andorra	6 - 19	Poland

Andorra la Vella

11 September 1993

Sweden	25 - 6	Andorra

Nässjö

17 October 1993

Czech Republic	19 - 18	Poland

Vyškov

31 October 1993

Netherlands	42 - 6	Czech Republic

The Hague

3 November 1993

Czech Republic	34 - 7	Sweden

Apeldoorn

6 November 1993

Netherlands	31 - 6	Sweden

Amsterdam

6 November 1993

Poland	30 - 10	Andorra

Sochaczew

26 March 1994

Andorra	10 - 49	Netherlands

Andorra la Vella

16 April 1994

Sweden	18 - 25	Poland

Karlskrona

23 April 1994

Czech Republic	56 - 0	Andorra

Prague

30 April 1994

Poland	13 - 10	Netherlands

Lublin

7 May 1994

Sweden	6 - 44	Netherlands

Vänersborg

Andorra	6 – 0 withdraw	Sweden

=== Pool B ===
Place	Nation	Games				Points			Table points
Place	Nation	played	won	drawn	lost	for	against	diff.	Table points
1	Croatia	8	7	0	1	294	56	+238	22
2	Hungary	8	4	0	4	75	187	-112	16
3	Slovenia	8	3	0	5	95	226	-131	14
4	Ukraine	8	4	0	4	183	42	+141	12
5	Austria	8	2	0	6	38	162	-124	12

31 October 1992

Austria	3 - 5	Hungary

Budapest

7 November 1992

Slovenia	3 - 35	Croatia

Ljubliana

21 November 1992

Slovenia	5 - 9	Austria

1 May 1993

Hungary	36 - 6	Slovenia

Budapest

8 May 1993

Austria	0 - 16	Croatia

Leoben

22 May 1993

Croatia	78 - 3	Hungary

Sisak

Ukraine	0 - 3 withdraw	Austria

Ukraine	0 - 3 withdraw	Croatia

Ukraine	0 - 3 withdraw	Slovenia

Ukraine	0 - 3 withdraw	Hungary

16 October 1993

Hungary	3 - 41	Ukraine

Miskolc

24 October 1993

Austria	11 - 14	Slovenia

Vienna

16 April 1994

Croatia	41 - 12	Austria

Sisak

23 April 1994

Croatia	77 - 10	Slovenia

Zagreb

29 April 1994

Croatia	13 - 23	Ukraine

Sisak

7 May 1994

Slovenia	26 - 41	Ukraine

Ljubliana

14 May 1994

Austria	0 - 78	Ukraine

Vienna

14 May 1994

Slovenia	28 - 17	Hungary

Ljubliana

28 May 1994

Hungary	5 - 31	Croatia

Érd

Hungary	3 - 0 withdraw	Austria

== Third Division ==
=== Pool A ===
Place	Nation	Games				Points			Table points
Place	Nation	played	won	drawn	lost	for	against	diff.	Table points
1	Georgia	3	2	1	0	60	34	+26	8
2	Latvia	3	2	0	1	38	38	0	7
3	Switzerland	3	1	0	2	38	40	-2	5
4	Luxembourg	3	0	1	2	28	52	-24	4

19 July 1992

Georgia	28 - 3	Latvia

Kyiv

30 April 1993

Luxembourg	10 - 25	Latvia

Luxembourg

31 October 1993

Luxembourg	10 - 10	Georgia

Cessange

6 November 1993

Latvia	10 - 0	Switzerland

Riga

15 May 1994

Luxembourg	8 - 17	Switzerland

Luxembourg

4 June 1994

Switzerland	21 - 22	Georgia

La Chaux-de-Fonds

=== Pool B ===
Place	Nation	Games				Points			Table points
Place	Nation	played	won	drawn	lost	for	against	diff.	Table points
1	Moldova	3	2	0	1	64	9	+55	6
2	Bulgaria	3	1	1	1	23	58	-35	6
3	Denmark	3	1	0	2	76	17	-59	4
4	Lithuania	3	0	1	2	21	100	-79	4

10 October 1993

Lithuania	6 - 22	Moldova

Šiauliai

6 November 1993

Bulgaria	9 - 9	Lithuania

Gabrovo

27 November 1993

Bulgaria	11 - 7	Denmark

Gabrovo

23 April 1994

Moldova	42 - 3	Bulgaria

Chișinău

7 May 1994

Denmark	69 - 6	Lithuania

Copenhagen

- Moldova-Denmark not played

== Bibliography ==
- (in Italian) Francesco Volpe, Valerio Vecchiarelli (2000), 2000 Italia in Meta, Storia della nazionale italiana di rugby dagli albori al Sei Nazioni, GS Editore (2000) ISBN 88-87374-40-6.
- (in Italian) Francesco Volpe, Paolo Pacitti (Author), Rugby 2000, GTE Gruppo Editorale (1999).
