= 1992–93 FIRA Preliminary Tournament =

1992–94 FIRA Trophy
- Date: 1 October 1992 – 24 May 1994
- Countries: Belgium; France; Germany; Italy; Morocco; Portugal; Romania; Russia; Spain; Tunisia

Tournament statistics
- Champions: France
- Matches played: 41

The 1992–94 FIRA Trophy was arranged with a new format. Ten teams were admitted to first division and divided into two pools to play a "Preliminary Tournament", that qualified five teams to play for the Trophy in the 1993–1994 season. France and Italy were the winners of Pools A and B. Russia and Romania also qualified as the runners-up.

== Pool A ==
Place	Nation	Games				Points			Table points
Place	Nation	played	won	drawn	lost	for	against	diff.	Table points
1	France	4	4	0	0	219	57	+162	12
2	Russia	4	3	0	1	66	+113	−47	10
3	Morocco	4	2	0	2	62	+70	−8	8
4	Germany	4	1	0	3	53	117	−64	6
5	Belgium	4	0	0	4	36	79	−43	4

- France and Russia qualified for Pool Title 1993–94
- Morocco qualified to Barrage
- Germany and Belgium qualified to the Pool for 6th place 1993–94

11 October 1992

Belgium	11–17	Russia

King Boudewijn, Brussels

18 October 1992

France XV	76–12	Russia

Villeneuve-sur-Lot

25 October 1992

Russia	13–10	Germany

Moscow

1 November 1992

Belgium	9–11	Morocco

Brussels

15 November 1992

Germany	13–10	Belgium

Stuttgart

21 March 1993

France Military	38–6	Belgium

Soissons

17 April 1993

Morocco	23–3	Germany

Casablanca

15 May 1993

Russia	24–16	Morocco

Moscow

29 May 1993

Morocco	12–34	France XV

Casablanca

30 May 1993

Germany	27–71	France XV

Hanover

== Pool B ==
Place	Nation	Games				Points			Table points
Place	Nation	played	won	drawn	lost	for	against	diff.	Table points
1	Italy	4	4	0	0	158	22	+136	12
2	Romania	4	3	0	1	128	50	+78	10
3	Spain	4	2	0	2	72	108	−36	8
4	Tunisia	4	1	0	3	30	132	−102	6
5	Portugal	4	0	0	4	49	125	−76	4

- Italy and Romania qualified for Pool Title 1993–94
- Spain qualified to Barrage
- Tunisia and Portugal qualified to the Pool for 6th place 1993–94

Point system: try 5 points, conversion: 2 points, penalty kick or drop goal 3 points.
Click "show" for more info about match (scorers, line-up etc.)

1 October 1992	Italy	22–3	Romania	Stadio Flaminio, Rome
	Try: Bottacchiari, Checchinato; Mar Cuttitta; Con: Bonomi, Troiani; Pen: Bonomi		Drop: Nichitean	Referee: D. Salle (France)
Italy: 15.Luigi Troiani, 14.Paolo Vaccari, 13.Stefano Barba, 12.Sergio Zorzi, 11.Marcello Cuttitta, 10.Massimo Bonomi, 9.Ivan Francescato, 8.Tito Ciccio, 7.Julian Gardner, 6.Alessandro Bottacchiari, 5.Mark Giacheri, 4.Carlo Checchinato, 3.Giovanni Grespan, 2.Giancarlo Pivetta (cap), 1.Massimo Cuttitta – Replacements: Ramiro Cassina, Umberto Casellato, Mauro Tommasi – Coach: Bertrand Fourcade				Referee: D. Salle (France)
Romania: 15.Vasile Brici, 14.Lucian Colceriu, 13.Nicolae Răcean, 12.Nicolae Fulina, 11.Gheorghe Solomie, 10.Neculai Nichitean, 9.Mihai Foca, 8.Ionuț Seceleanu, 7.Tiberiu Brînză, 6.Gheorghe Dinu, 5.Tudor Constantin, 4.Sandu Ciorăscu, 3.Gabriel Vlad, 2.Christian Gheorghe, 1.Gheorghe Leonte – Replacements: Andrei Gurănescu, Constantin Stan

30 January 1993

Tunisia	8–20	Spain

Tunisia

14 February 1993	Spain	0–52	Italy	Campo Universitario Madrid
			Try: M.Cuttitta, Dotto; Rigo 2, Venturi 2 Con: Dominguez 5 Pen: Dominguez 4	Referee: Caulet (France)
Spain : 15.Francisco Puertas, 14.Pablo Calderon, 13.Javier Torres, 12.Gabriel Rivero, 11.José Ángel Hermosilla, 10.Miguel Sánchez Gonzalez-Bermudo, 9.Javier Díaz Paternain, 8.Emilio Illaregui, 7.Jaime Gutíérrez, 6.Iñaki Laskurain, 5.Alberto Malo, 4.Alejandro Esteve Herrera, 3.José Luis Moral, 2.Javier Aguiar, 1.Julio Alvarez – replacements: Aitor Gorrotxategui, Mario Auzmendi, Jordi Camps				Referee: Caulet (France)
Italy : 15.Luigi Troiani, 14.Edgardo Venturi, 13.Stefano Barba, 12.Stefano Bordon, 11.Marcello Cuttitta, 10.Diego Dominguez, 9.Umberto Casellato, 8.Tito Ciccio', 7.Massimo Giovanelli (cap.), 6.Stefano Rigo, 5.Mark Giacheri, 4.Roberto Favaro, 3.Giovanni Grespan, 2.Carlo Orlandi, 1.Massimo Cuttitta – replacements: Pier Massimiliano Dotto, Francesco Pietrosanti – Coach: Bertrand Fourcade

27 March 1993

Italy A	51–8	Tunisia

Leno

3 April 1993

Portugal	13–41	Romania
Try: Mourão; Con: Queimado; Pen: Macedo, Queimado		Try: Gurănescu, Răcean (2), Solomie, Brînză, Tofan, Mitocaru; Con: Nichitean, Răcean (2)

National Stadium A, Lisbon
Attendance: 1,000

17 April 1993	Portugal	11–33	Italy	University Stadium, Coimbra
	Try: Morais; Pen: Queimado (2)		Try: Casellato, Coppo, Perziano, Rigo, Tommasi; Con: Filizzola; Pen: Filizzola (2)	Attendance: 1,000; Referee: (France) Yves Peyrelongue
Portugal : 15.Pedro Rogério Arsénio, 14.Pedro Murinello, 13.Rodrigo Castro Pereira, 12.Nuno Mourão, 11.Tomaz Morais, 10.João Queimado, 9.João Jonet, 8.António Cunha, 7.Jorge Herédia, 6.Francisco Borges, 5.Pedro Correia Neiva, 4.Simão Cunha, 3.Luís Nieves, 2.Miguel Baptista, 1.Eduardo Macedo – replacements: Joaquim Ferreira				Attendance: 1,000; Referee: (France) Yves Peyrelongue
Italy : 15.Gabriel Filizzola, 14.Massimo Brunello, 13.Stefano Bordon, 12.Mauro Tommasi, 11.Leonardo Perziano, 10.Hector de Marco, 9.Umberto Casellato, 8.Fabio Coppo, 7.Massimo Giovanelli (cap.), 6.Stefano Rigo, 5.Mark Giacheri, 4.Carlo Checchinato, 3.Massimo Cuttitta, 2.Alessandro Moscardi, 1.Mauro Dal Sie – replacements: Giuliano Faltibà, Andrea Sgorlon

24 April 1993

Tunisia	14–10	Portugal

El Menzah Stadium, Tunis

8 May 1993

Romania	51–0	Tunisia

Dinamo Stadion, Bucharest
Attendance: 2,000

16 May 1993

Portugal	15–37	Spain

Lisbon University Stadium, Lisbon
Attendance: 8,000

29 May 1993

Romania	33–15	Spain

Parcul Copilului, Bucharest
Attendance: 2,000
Referee: (France) D. Neyrat

== Barrage ==
28 November 1993

Spain	48–17	Morocco
Try: de la Calle, Martín Illanes (3), Puertas Soto; Con: Sánchez González Bermudo (4); Pen: Sánchez González Bermudo (5)		Try: Jelti, Harrad; Con: Echellaoui (2); Pen: Echellaoui

Le Stade de Toulouse, Toulouse

- Spain qualified for Title Pool.

== Bibliography ==
- (in Italian) Francesco Volpe, Valerio Vecchiarelli (2000), 2000 Italia in Meta, Storia della nazionale italiana di rugby dagli albori al Sei Nazioni, GS Editore (2000) ISBN 88-87374-40-6.
- (in Italian) Francesco Volpe, Paolo Pacitti (Author), Rugby 2000, GTE Gruppo Editorale (1999).
