= 1992 Argentina rugby union tour of Europe =

Summary
| P | W | D | L |
Total
| 3 | 7 | 0 | 1 |
Test match
| 3 | 3 | 0 | 0 |
Opponent
| P | W | D | L |
Spain
| 1 | 1 | 0 | 0 |
Romania
| 1 | 1 | 0 | 0 |
France
| 1 | 1 | 0 | 0 |

The 1992 Argentina rugby union tour of Europe was a series of eight matches played by the Argentina national rugby union team in October and November 1992, in France, Spain and Romania. The renewed and young Argentinian team won all the test match.

== Matches ==
=== In Spain ===
20 October 1992

| Madrid XV | 10–94 | Argentina XV |
| Try: Serres; Con: Nuñez; Pen: Nuñez | | Try: Arena 3, Jorge 3 Roby 2, Terán >br/>Cremaschi, García 3 Le Fort; Con: Crexell 9 Pen: Crexell 2 |

Ciudad Universitaria, Madrid
Referee: José López Lady F.E.R

Madrid Combined XV: Guterrez (Turón); Leguey (Alvarez), Serres, García de la Torre, Revuelta (Peña); Nuñez, Hernandez Gil; Valeira (Duncan), Izquierdo, Monzón; I. Serván, J.Gutierrez; Mascaró, Cerrales, Aguiar.
Argentina: R. dela Arena; G. Jorge (M. Terán) P. Cremaschi, S. Salvat (F.J. Mendez), M Roby; L. Arbizu (capt.), R. Crexell; R. Perez, J. Santamarina, G. García; G. Llanes, P. Sporleder; O. Hassan, R. Le Fort, M. Corral.

24 October 1992

| Spain | 34–43 | Argentina |
| Try: Puertas, Altuna; Torres Morote, De la Calle; Con: Sanchez 4 Pen: Sanchez 2 | | Try: Cuesta Silva 2, Jorge; F.J.Mendez, Camardón penalty try Con: Mesón 5 Pen: Mesón |

Ciudad Universitaria, Madrid
Referee: Marc Darroque ( (F.F.R.)

| Spain | | | Argentina |
| Francisco Puertas Soto | FB | 15 | FB | Santiago Meson |
| Jose Angel Hermosilla Olmos | W | 14 | W | Martin Teran Nougues |
| Gabriel Rivero Macia | C | 13 | C | Diego Cuesta Silva |
| Jon Azkargorta | C | 12 | C | Lisandro Arbizu (capt.) |
| Javier Torres Morote | W | 11 | W | Gustavo Jorge |
| Miguel Sanchez Gonzalez-Bermudo | FH | 10 | FH | Federico Jose Mendez |
| Javier Diaz Paternain | SH | 9 | SH | Gonzalo Camardón |
| Mario Auzmendi Ripoll | N8 | 8 | N8 | Jose Santamarina |
| Jon Etxeberria Landazabal | F | 7 | F | Francisco Irarrazaval |
| Inaki Laskurain | F | 6 | F | Raúl Pérez |
| Ignacio Servan Garcia | L | 5 | L | Normando Ferrari |
| Ignacio del Canto Banos | L | 4 | L | Pedro Sporleder |
| Asier Altuna Izaguirre | P | 3 | P | Federico Méndez |
| Fernando de la Calle | H | 2 | H | Eduardo Garbarino |
| Julio Alvarez | P | 1 | P | Patricio Noriega |
| | | Replacements |
| Pablo Martin Illanes | W |

=== In Romania ===
27 October 1992

| Romania B | 13–33 | Argentina XV |
| Try: Colceriu, Negreci; Pen: Petre | | Try: Mesón, de la Arena; Roby, Barcía; Bullrich, Con: Mesón 4 |

Tractoril, Brasov
Referee: Marc Darroque (F.F.R.)

Romania B : Mazilu; Olarescu, Draghia, Sava, Colceriu; Petre, Udroiu; Stefanescu, Oroian, Draguceanu; Branescu (Gunarescu), Caragia; Soare (Solojean), Negreci (Roddoi), Costea.
Argentina: S.Mesón; R.de la Arena, L.Arbizu (capt.), P.Cremaschi, M.Roby; G.Camardón, F.Bullrich; D.García, J.Santamarina (N.Ferrari), F.Buabes; G.Llanes, R.Pérez; O.Hassan, R.Le Fort, M.Corral.

31 October 1992

| Romania | 18–21 | Argentina |
| Try: Dumitras 2 Con: Nichitan; Pen: Nichitan 2 | | Try: Camardón, Le Foro; Penalty try Con: Mesón 3 |

Stadionul Dinamo, Bucharest
Referee: McCartney (S.R.U.)

| Romania | | | Argentina |
| Stefan Tofan | FB | 15 | FB | Santiago Meson |
| Adrian Mitorcariu | W | 14 | W | Martin Teran Nougues |
| Nicolae Racean | C | 13 | C | Diego Cuesta Silva |
| Adrian Lungu | C | 12 | C | Lisandro Arbizu (capt.) |
| Gheorghe Solomie | W | 11 | W | Gustavo Jorge |
| Neculai Nichitean | FH | 10 | FH | Federico Jose Mendez |
| Calin Fugigi | SH | 9 | SH | Gonzalo Camardón |
| Ionut Seceleanu | N8 | 8 | N8 | Jose Santamarina |
| Tiberiu Brinza | F | 7 | F | Gonzalo Garcia Orsetti |
| Haralambie Dumitras | F | 6 | F | Raúl Pérez |
| Constantin Cojocariu | L | 5 | L | Pedro Sporleder |
| Sandu Ciorascu | L | 4 | L | Germán Llanes |
| Gabriel Vlad | P | 3 | P | Federico Méndez |
| Gheorghe Ion | H | 2 | H | Ricardo le Fort |
| Gheorghe Leonte | P | 1 | P | Patricio Noriega |
| | | Replacements |
| Mihai Foca | SH | | SH | Rafael Bullrich |
| Adrian Girbu | F |
| Constantin Stan | P |
| align=right | align=right| | align=center |

=== In France ===
4 November 1992

| Cote Basque | 21–13 | Argentina XV |
| Try: Goulomet, Beraza; Hontas; Pen: Beraza 2 | | Try: Roby; Con: Mesón; Pen: Mesón 2 |

St. Leon, Bayonne
Referee: Jean Casteret (F.F.R.)

Cote Basque XV: Lamaison; Berza, Pain, Vergniol, Hontas; Arrieta (Lescarboura), Accoceberry; Milheres, Goulomet (Ravier), Magnes; Braud, Sanoko; Salles, Gonzalez, Lascube.
Argentina: S.Mesón; R.de la Arena, S.Salvat, L.Arbizu (capt.), M.Roby; G.Camardón, R.Crexell; .Irrazabal, N.Ferrari, G.García; G.Llanes, P.Sporleder; O.Hassan (E.Noriega), E.Garbarino, M.Corral.

7 November 1992

| Roussillion XV | 10–13 | Argentina XV |
| Try: Arbó; Con: Tresene; Drop: Atty | | Try: Pérez; Con: Mesón; Pen: Mesón; Drop: Arbizu |

Stadio Aimé Giral, Perpignan
Referee: Joseph Yeman (W.R.U.)

Roussillon XV: Tresene; Arbo, Martín, Enrique (Gaullo) Amorós; Atty, Macabiau; Lieurmot, Delpoux, Beltrán (X.Tresene); Fourny, Mascardó (Aoutones); Laurente, Morizot, Amalric.
Argentina: S.Mesón; D.Cuesta Silva, L.Arbizu (capt.), S.Salvat, M.Terán; G.Camardón, F.Bullrich; G.García, J.Santamarina, R.Perez; G.Llanes, P.Sporleder; F.Mendez, R.Le Fort, E.Noriega.

10 November 1992

| Limousin-Auvergne XV | 12–18 | Argentina XV |
| Try: Faugeron, Lherrmet; Con: Nicol | | Try: Camardón, Arbizu; Con: Mesón; Pen: Mesón 2 |

Municipal, Brive
Referee: Daniel Pascal (F.F.R.)

Limousin-Auvergne: Darlet (Branchet); Bertrand, Soubira, Nicol, Faugeron; Romeo, Rioux; Lhermet, Maisonnve, Van deslinden; Chamelot, Allegret; Crespy, Faure, Marocco.
Argentina:S.Mesón; M.Terán, S.Salvat, D.Cuesta Silva, G.Jorge; L.Arbizu (capt.), Camardón; R.Pérez, J.Santamarina, F.Buabse; P.Sporleder, G.Llanes; O.Hassan, R.Le FOrt, F. Mendez.

14 November 1992

| France | 20–24 | Argentina |
| Try: Galthié, Gonzalez; Sella; Con: Viras; Pen: Viras | | Pen: Mesón 7 Drop: Arbizu |

Stade Marcel Saupin, Nantes
Referee: Ray Maegson (S.R.U.)

| France | | | Argentina |
| Sebastien Viars | FB | 15 | FB | Santiago Meson |
| Philippe Bernat-Salles | W | 14 | W | Martin Teran Nougues |
| Philippe Sella | C | 13 | C | Diego Cuesta Silva |
| Alain Penaud | C | 12 | C | Sebastian Salvat |
| Peyo Hontas | W | 11 | W | Gustavo Jorge |
| Laurent Mazas | FH | 10 | FH | Lisandro Arbizu (capt.) |
| Fabien Galthié | SH | 9 | SH | Gonzalo Camardón |
| Abdelatif Benazzi | N8 | 8 | N8 | Jose Santamarina |
| (capt.) Jean-Francois Tordo | F | 7 | F | Gonzalo Garcia Orsetti |
| Philippe Benetton | F | 6 | F | Raúl Pérez |
| Olivier Roumat | L | 5 | L | Germán Llanes |
| Christophe Mougeot | L | 4 | L | Pedro Sporleder |
| Philippe Gallart | P | 3 | P | Patricio Noriega |
| Jean-Michel Gonzalez | H | 2 | H | Ricardo le Fort |
| Louis Armary | P | 1 | P | Federico Méndez |
| | | Replacements |
| Stéphane Graou | P |

== Sources ==
- "MEMORIA Temporada año 1992" (DOC) (in Spanish). Union Argentina de Rugby. December 1992.
