= 1987–1989 FIRA Trophy =

European rugby union championship

1987-89 FIRA Trophy
- Date: 25 October 1987 – 9 May 1989
- Countries: France; Italy; Romania; Spain; Soviet Union

Tournament statistics
- Champions: France
- Matches played: 20

The 1987–89 FIRA Trophy was the 27th edition of a European rugby union championship for national teams. It was played along two seasons (1987–1988 and 1988–89).

The tournament was won by France, with a single loss to Soviet Union (17–10) in Kutaisi. Despite facing strong opposition from both Italy and Soviet Union, the French only awarded caps in their games with Romania, who finished in 3rd place, while the Soviets reached the 2nd place. Spain lost all their matches and were relegated.

The winners of the Second division two pools were Poland and Belgium, who faced each other in a final, with the Poles winning (25–23).

== First division ==
Place	Nation	Games				Points			Table points
Place	Nation	played	won	drawn	lost	for	against	diff.	Table points
1	France	8	7	0	1	241	92	+149	22
2	Soviet Union	8	6	0	2	129	92	+37	20
3	Romania	8	5	0	3	117	128	-11	18
4	Italy	8	2	0	6	95	148	-53	12
5	Spain	8	0	0	8	81	203	-122	8

- Spain relegated to second division

Point system: try 4 pt, conversion: 2 pt., penalty kick 3 pt. drop 3 pt
Click "show" for more info about match (scorers, line-up etc.)

25 October 1987

Romania	18 - 10	Soviet Union
Try: Toader; Con: Dumitru; Pen: Dumitru (4)		Try: Hairulin; Pen: Mironov, Sijussar

Iași
Attendance: 8,000
Referee: (Italy) N. Camaduro

7 November 1987

Soviet Union	12 - 9	Italy
Pen: Mironov (3); Drop: Sijussar		Pen: Bettarello (3)

Kishinev
Attendance: 8,000
Referee: (France) M. Lamoulie

11 November 1987

France	49 - 3	Romania
Try: Andrieu (2), Berot, Lagisquet (2), Ondarts, penalty try Con: Berot (6); Pen: Berot (3)		Drop: Alexandru

Stade Armandie, Agen
Attendance: 10,417
Referee: (Scotland) Jim Fleming

5 December 1987

Spain	0 - 13	Italy
		Try: de Biase, Gaetaniello; Con: Bettarello; Pen: Stefano Bettarello

Estadi Baldiri Aleu, Sant Boi de Llobregat
Attendance: 3,000
Referee: (France) J. Doulcet

7 February 1988

France A1	19 - 9	Italy
Try: Bonneval, Deslandes, Gleyze (2); Drop: Trille		Pen: Ambrosio (3)

Stade Louis II, Montecarlo, Monaco
Attendance: 7,000
Referee: (Belgium) D. Roelands

2 April 1988

Italy	3 - 12	Romania
Pen: Bonomi		Try: Radulescu; Con: Ignat; Drop: Ignat

San Siro, Milan
Attendance: 9,000
Referee: (France) P. Frantschi

17 April 1988

Romania	16 - 7	Spain
Try: Caragea, Piti; Con: Ignat; Pen: Ignat (3)		Try: Oller Rodriguez; Pen: Díaz Lavilla

Focşani
Referee: (Soviet Union) A. Grumbinas

23 April 1988

Soviet Union	12 - 7	Spain
Pen: Mironov (2); Drop: Mironov, Dzagnidze		Try: Chocarro Huesa; Pen: Díaz Paternain

Municipal Stadium, Kutaisi
Attendance: 1,500

15 May 1988

Spain	16 - 32	France XV

Ciudad Universitaria, Madrid
Attendance: 9,000

22 May 1988

Soviet Union	17 - 10	France XV

Municipal Stadium, Kutaisi

23 October 1988

Soviet Union	23 - 9	Romania
Try: Molchanov, Tikhonov (2); Con: Dzagnidze; Pen: Dzagnidze (3)		Pen: Dumitru (3)

Alma Ata
Attendance: 12,000

5 November 1988

Italy	12 - 18	Soviet Union
Pen: Bettarello (4)		Try: Mironov; Con: Dzagnidze; Pen: Dzagnidze (2); Drop: Mironov

Stadio Comunale di Monigo, Treviso
Attendance: 15,000
Referee: (France) M. Lamoulie

20 November 1988

Spain	9-21	Soviet Union
Pen: Blanco Duelo (2); Drop: Díaz Paternain		Try: Nechaev, Hairulin; Con: Mironov; Pen: Mironov (2), Dzagnidze

Ciudad Universitaria, Madrid
Attendance: 5,000

26 November 1988

Romania	12 - 16	France
Try: Neaga; Con: Ignat; Pen: Ignat (2)		Try: Blanco, Lagisquet; Con: Berot; Pen: Berot (2)

Dinamo Stadion, Bucharest
Attendance: 5,000
Referee: (Wales) C. Norling

19 February 1989

Italy	12 - 40	France A1
Pen: Capitani (3); Drop: Tebaldi (2)		Try: Hondagne-Monge, Lecomte (2), Sallaber (2), Tremouille, Trille; Con: Berot (3); Pen: Berot (2)

Stadio Mompiano, Brescia
Referee: (Soviet Union) A. Grombinas

19 March 1989

France XV	57 - 7	Spain

Parc des Sports d'Ondarraitz, Hendaye

15 April 1989

Romania	28 - 4	Italy
Try: Boldor, Coman, Ignat, Murariu; Con: Ignat (3); Pen: Ignat; Drop: Ignat		Try: Ceselin

Dinamo Stadion, Bucharest
Referee: (France) Y. Peyrelongue

20 May 1989

France XV	18 - 16	Soviet Union

Valence

21 May 1989

Spain	16 - 19	Romania
Try: Gutiérrez Merelles; Pen: Díaz Paternain (4)		Try: Neaga, Chirila; Con: Ignat; Pen: Ignat (3)

Polideportivo El Saler, Valencia
Attendance: 5,000
Referee: (Italy) A. Condorelli

2 June 1989

Italy	33 - 19	Spain
Try: Ambrosio, Covi, Pietrosanti, Pivetta, Venturi; Con: Troiani (3); Pen: Troiani (3)		Try: Malo, Puertas Soto; Con: Díaz Paternain; Pen: Tejada Chacon

Stadio Tommaso Fattori, L'Aquila
Referee: (Romania) Vasilica

== Second division ==
=== Pool A ===
Place	Nation	Games				Points			Table points
Place	Nation	played	won	drawn	lost	for	against	diff.	Table points
1	Poland	6	6	0	0	126	49	+77	18
2	Morocco	6	2	1	3	47	66	-19	11
3	Czechoslovakia	6	2	0	4	78	96	-18	10
4	Tunisia	6	1	1	4	62	102	-40	9

1987

Tunisia	6 - 11	Morocco

Tunis

23 April 1988

Czechoslovakia	18 - 9	Tunisia

Prague

13 May 1988

Morocco	7 - 13	Poland

Casablanca

15 May 1988

Poland	18 - 9	Czechoslovakia

Sochaczew

21 May 1988

Czechoslovakia	15 - 0	Morocco

Prague

29 May 1988

Poland	18 - 6	Morocco

Kraków

1988

Poland	21 - 6	Tunisia

25 March 1989

Morocco	17 - 8	Czechoslovakia

Casablanca

5 May 1989

Tunisia	26 - 16	Czechoslovakia

Tunis

20 May 1989

Czechoslovakia	12 - 26	Poland

Prague

1989

Tunisia	9 - 30	Poland

1989

Morocco	6 - 6	Tunisia

Casablanca

=== Pool B ===
Place	Nation	Games				Points			Table points
Place	Nation	played	won	drawn	lost	for	against	diff.	Table points
1	Belgium	8	6	1	1	155	103	+52	21
2	West Germany	8	5	0	3	139	95	+44	18
3	Portugal	8	4	1	3	118	117	+1	17
4	Netherlands	8	3	0	5	111	115	-4	14
5	Yugoslavia	8	1	0	7	66	159	-93	10

25 October 1987

Netherlands	15 - 20	Belgium

Sportpark Berestein, Hilversum

15 November 1987

West Germany	21 - 24	Belgium

Berlin

29 November 1987

Yugoslavia	6 - 15	West Germany

Split

13 December 1987

Portugal	7 - 13	Belgium

Lisbon University Stadium, Lisbon

21 February 1988

Portugal	16 - 9	Netherlands

Municipal Stadium, Lousã

20 March 1988

West Germany	6 - 3	Netherlands

Fritz-Grunebaum-Sportpark, Heidelberg

14 April 1988

Belgium	18 - 11	Yugoslavia

Liège

17 April 1988

Netherlands	31 - 10	Yugoslavia

Sportpark Berestein, Hilversum

17 April 1988

Portugal	13 - 9	West Germany

Estádio da Coutada, Arcos de Valdevez

8 May 1988

Yugoslavia	9 - 22	Portugal

Split
Attendance: 1,000

22 October 1988

Belgium	27 - 9	Netherlands

13 November 1988

Yugoslavia	9 - 31	Belgium

Split

20 November 1988

West Germany	29 - 6	Yugoslavia

Rudolf-Kalweit-Stadion, Hanover

27 November 1988

Yugoslavia	6 - 0	Netherlands

Split

10 December 1988

Belgium	7 - 16	West Germany

Brussels

5 April 1989

Netherlands	23 - 17	Portugal

Sportpark Berestein, Hilversum

8 April 1989

Belgium	15 - 15	Portugal

Brussels

16 April 1989

Netherlands	21 - 13	West Germany

Sportpark Berestein, Hilversum

22 April 1989

Portugal	13 - 9	Yugoslavia

Municipal Stadium, Lousã

30 April 1989

West Germany	30 - 15	Portugal

Rudolf-Kalweit-Stadion, Hanover

=== Final ===
29 October 1989

Poland	25 - 23	Belgium

Madrid

- Poland promoted to Division 1

== Third division ==
Place	Nation	Games				Points			Table points
Place	Nation	played	won	drawn	lost	for	against	difference	Table points
1	Bulgaria	4	4	0	0	78	21	+57	12
2	Andorra	4	1	0	3	43	64	-21	6
3	Luxembourg	4	1	0	3	21	57	-36	6

- Bulgaria promoted to division 2

8 October 1987

Andorra	24 - 3	Luxembourg

Andorra la Vella

28 May 1988

Bulgaria	30 - 6	Andorra

Sofia

1988

Luxembourg	4 - 14	Bulgaria

Luxembourg

23 April 1989

Luxembourg	10 - 6	Andorra

Luxembourg

28 May 1989

Andorra	7 - 21	Bulgaria

Andorra la Vella

1989

Bulgaria	13 - 4	Luxembourg

Sofia

== Bibliography ==
- (in Italian) Francesco Volpe, Valerio Vecchiarelli (2000), 2000 Italia in Meta, Storia della nazionale italiana di rugby dagli albori al Sei Nazioni, GS Editore (2000) ISBN 88-87374-40-6.
- (in Italian) Francesco Volpe, Paolo Pacitti (Author), Rugby 2000, GTE Gruppo Editorale (1999).
