= History of rugby union matches between Spain and Portugal =

Spain (los Leones) and Portugal (os Lobos) have been playing against each other since 1935 when the Leones beat the Lobos in Lisbon 5-6. A total of 43 matches have been played, with Spain having won 27 times, Portugal having won 14 times and 2 matches having been drawn. There is a considerable rivalry between the sides due to the proximity of the two countries in the Iberian Peninsula. Both teams are currently part of the Rugby Europe Championship.

== Summary ==
=== Overall ===
| Details | Played | Won by Spain | Won by Portugal | Drawn | Spain points | Portugal points |
|---|---|---|---|---|---|---|
| In Spain | 21 | 17 | 3 | 1 | 502 | 298 |
| In Portugal | 21 | 9 | 11 | 1 | 421 | 408 |
| Neutral venue | 1 | 1 | 0 | 0 | 21 | 17 |
| Overall | 43 | 27 | 14 | 2 | 944 | 723 |

== Results ==
2026

| 8 March 2026 Rugby Europe Championship | Portugal | 26 - 7 | Spain | Lisbon |
| | Try: Rodrigo Marta (2); Con: Domingos Cabral (2); Pen: Domingos Cabral (4) Coach; Simon Mannix; Captain; José Madeira | HT: 13 - 0 Reference | Try: Alex Saleta; Con: Lucien Richardis Coach; Pablo Bouza; Captain; Jon Zabala | Stadium: O Restelo; Referee: Keane Davison (Ireland) |

2025

| 1 March 2025 Rugby Europe Championship | Portugal | 31 - 42 | Spain | Lisbon |
| | Try: Diogo Rodrigues (2); Raffaele Storti; Antonio Andrade; Con: Manuel Vareiro (2); Hugo Aubry (2); Pen: Manuel Vareiro Coach; Simon Mannix; Captain; Tomas Appleton | HT: 17 - 23 Reference | Try: Raphael Nieto; Gauthier Minguillon (2); Con: Gonzalo López (3); Pen: Gonzalo López (7) Coach; Pablo Bouza; Captain; Álvaro García | Stadium: Nacional do Jamor; Referee: Adam Jones (Wales) |

2024

| 3 March 2024 Rugby Europe Championship | Portugal | 33 - 30 | Spain | Lisbon |
| | Try: Lucas Martins; Jose Lima; Manuel Cardoso; Con: Hugo Aubry (3); Pen: Hugo Aubry (4) Coach: José Paixao; Captain: Tomas Appleton | HT: 13 - 20 Reference | Try: Iñaki Mateu; Martiniano Cian; Brice Ferrer; Con: Gonzalo López; Bautista Güemes (2); Pen: Gonzalo López; Bautista Güemes (2) Coach; Pablo Bouza; Captain; Mario Pichardie | Stadium: O Restelo; Referee: Benoit Rousselet (France) |

2023

| 4 March 2023 Rugby Europe Championship | Portugal | 27 - 10 | Spain | Lisbon |
| | Try: Rodrigo Marta; Duarte Diniz; Samuel Marques; Con: Samuel Marques (3); Pen: Samuel Marques (2) Coach: Patrice Lagisquet; Captain: Tomas Appleton | HT: 7 - 10 Reference | Try: Joshua Peters; Con: Gonzalo Vinuesa; Pen: Gonzalo Vinuesa Coach; Santiago Santos; Captain; Jon Zabala | Stadium: O Restelo; Referee: Thomas Charabas (France) |

2022

| 13 March 2022 Rugby Europe Championship | Spain | 33 - 28 | Portugal | Central |
| | Try: Jon Zabala; Fred Quercy; Marco Pinto (2); Con: Manuel Ordas (2); Pen: Manuel Ordas (3) Coach; Santiago Santos; Captain; Fernando López | HT: 24 - 17 Reference | Try: Simao Bento; Pedro Bettencourt; Jose Madeira; Con: Samuel Marques (2); Pen: Samuel Marques (3) Coach: Patrice Lagisquet; Captain: Jose Lima | Attendance: Madrid; Referee: Tual Trainini (France) |

2021

| 27 March 2021 Rugby Europe Championship | Portugal | 43 - 28 | Spain | Lisbon |
| | Try: Rafael Simoes; Jeronimo Portela; Rodrigo Marta; Raffaele Storti; Samuel Marques; Francisco Fernandes; Con: Samuel Marques (5); Pen: Samuel Marques Coach: Patrice Lagisquet; Captain: Tomas Appleton | HT: 14 - 21 Reference | Try: Marco Pinto; Guillaume Rouet; Charly Malié; Manuel Ordas; Con: Manuel Ordas (4) Coach; Santiago Santos; Captain; Fernando López | Stadium: CAR Jamor; Referee: Ludovic Cayre (France) |

| 7 February 2021 Rugby Europe Championship | Spain | 25 - 11 | Portugal | Madrid |
| | Try: Bautista Güemes; Julen Goia; Gautier Gibouin; Con: Bautista Güemes (2); Pen: Bautista Güemes (2) Coach; Santiago Santos; Captain; Fernando López | HT: 6 - 5 Reference | Try: Rodrigo Marta; Pen: Dany Antunes (2) Coach: Patrice Lagisquet; Captain: Tomas Appleton | Stadium: Central; Referee: Chris Busby (Ireland) |

2016

| 12 March 2016 European Nations Cup | Spain | 39 - 7 | Portugal | Madrid |
| | Try: Ignacio Contardi; Julen Goia; Beñat Auzqui (2); Gregory Maiquez; Con: Brad Linklater (4); Pen: Brad Linklater (2) Coach; Santiago Santos; Captain; Jaime Nava | HT: 18 - 7 Reference | Try: José Vareta; Con: Nuno Guedes Coach: Ian Smith; Captain: Francisco Magalhaes | Stadium: Central; Referee: Sean Gallagher (Ireland) |

2015

| 14 March 2015 European Nations Cup | Portugal | 8 - 19 | Spain | Coimbra |
| | Try: Tomas Noronha; Pen: Nuno Penha e Costa Coach: Joao Luis Pinto; Captain: Vasco Uva | HT: 8 - 8 Reference | Try: Julen Goia; Sergi Aubanell; Pen: Sergi Aubanell (3) Coach; Santiago Santos; Captain; Jesús Recuerda | Stadium: Sérgio Conceição; Referee: Matthew Carley (England) |

2014

| 15 March 2014 European Nations Cup | Portugal | 24 - 28 | Spain | Lisbon |
| | Try: Vasco Uva; Antonio Aguilar; Con: Pedro Bettencourt; Pen: Pedro Bettencourt (4) Coach: Frederico Sousa; Captain: Joao Correia | HT: 18 - 6 Reference | Try: Penalty Try; Jaike Carter; Igor Genua; Con: Charly Malié (2); Pen: Charly Malié (3) Coach; Santiago Santos; Captain; Pablo Feijoo | Stadium: Universitário; Referee: Laurent Cardona (France) |

2013

| 16 March 2013 European Nations Cup | Spain | 9 - 9 | Portugal | Santiago de Compostela |
| | Pen: Corey Simpson (2); Jaime Nava Coach; Bryce Bevin; Captain; Jon Magunazelaia | HT: 6 - 0 Reference | Pen: Pedro Leal (2); Samuel Marques Coach: Errol Brain; Captain: Joao Correia | Stadium: San Lázaro; Referee: Cedric Marchat (France) |

2012

| 10 March 2012 European Nations Cup | Portugal | 23 - 17 | Spain | Coimbra |
| | Try: David dos Reis; Mike Tadjer; Con: Pedro Leal (2); Pen: Pedro Leal (3) Coach: Errol Brain; Captain: Gonçalo Uva | HT: 6 - 8 Reference | Try: Beñat Auzqui; Pen: Mathieu Peluchon (4) Coach; Regis Sonnes; Captain; César Sempere | Stadium: Sérgio Conceição; Referee: Claudio Passacantando (Italy) |

2011

| 12 March 2011 European Nations Cup | Spain | 25 - 10 | Portugal | Madrid |
| | Try: Adrien Ayestaran; Con: Martín Heredia; Pen: Martín Heredia (6) Coach; Regis Sonnes; Captain; Martín Aceña | HT: 13 - 10 Reference | Try: Bernardo Silveira; Con: Joe Gardener; Pen: Joe Gardener Coach: Errol Brain; Captain: Jose Pinto | Stadium: Central; Referee: Mauricio Dordolo (Italy) |

2010

| 13 March 2010 European Nations Cup | Spain | 15 - 33 | Portugal | Madrid |
| | Try: Javier Canosa; Perico Martín; Con: Jaime Nava; Pen: Jaime Nava Coach; Ged Glynn; Captain; Leandro Fdez-Aramburu | HT: 8 - 27 Reference | Try: Antonio Aguilar; Conrad Strickling; Frederico Oliveira; Con: Pedro Cabral (3); Pen: Pedro Cabral (3); Joe Gardener Coach: Tomaz Morais; Captain: | Stadium: Central; Referee: Stefano Penne (Italy) |

2009

| 15 March 2009 European Nations Cup | Portugal | 24 - 19 | Spain | Lisbon |
| | Try: Juan Murre; Tiago Girao; Con: Pedro Cabral; Pen: Pedro Cabral (2); Pedro Leal; Duarte Pinto Coach: Tomaz Morais; Captain: Joao Correia | HT: 18 - 6 Reference | Try: César Sempere; Con: Mathieu Gratton; Pen: Jeremías Palumbo (2); Mathieu Gratton; Dro: Jeremías Palumbo Coach; Ged Glynn; Captain; Javier Canosa | Stadium: Universitário; Referee: Giulio di Santis (Italy) |

2008

| 10 May 2008 European Nations Cup | Spain | 21 - 17 | Portugal | Madrid |
| | Try: Ion Insausti; Penalty Try; Juan Cano; Con: Mathieu Gratton (3) Coach; Ged Glynn; Captain; Iván Criado | HT: 21 - 7 Reference | Try: Antonio Aguilar; David Mateus; Con: Duarte Cardoso Pinto; José Pinto Neves; Pen: José Pinto Neves Coach: Tomaz Morais; Captain: Joao Correia | Stadium: Central; Referee: Eric Darrière (France) |

2007

| 3 February 2007 European Nations Cup | Portugal | 21 - 18 | Spain | Lisbon |
| | Try: Diogo Mateus; Vasco Uva; Con: Duarte Cardoso Pinto; Pen: Duarte Cardoso Pinto (3) Coach: Tomaz Morais; Captain: Vasco Uva | HT: 10 - 13 Reference | Try: Mathieu Cidre (2); Con: Esteban Roqué; Pen: Esteban Roqué (2) Coach; Ged Glynn; Captain; Iván Criado | Stadium: Universitário; Referee: Hervé Dubes (France) |

2004

| 21 March 2004 European Nations Cup | Spain | 19 - 35 | Portugal | Ibiza |
| | Try: Ferrán Velazco; Pedro Dávila; Pen: Andrei Kovalenco (3) Coach; Ged Glynn; Captain; Ferrán Velazco | HT: 8 - 25 Reference | Try: Nuno Garvao (3); Diogo Mateus; Antonio Aguilar (2); Con: Gonzalo Malheiro; Pen: Gonzalo Malheiro Coach; Tomaz Morais; Captain; Luis Pissarra | Stadium: Can Misses; Referee: Akim Hadj-Bachir (France) |

2003

| 23 March 2003 European Nations Cup | Portugal | 35 - 16 | Spain | Coimbra |
| | Try: Antonio Cunha; Frederico Abreu de Sousa; Con: Gonzalo Malheiro (2); Pen: Gonzalo Malheiro (5); Drop: Gonzalo Malheiro (2) Coach; Tomaz Morais; Captain; Luis Pissarra | HT: 6 - 9 Reference | Try: Steve Tuineau; Con: Manuel Cascarra; Pen: Manuel Cascarra (2); Drop: Andrei Kovalenco Coach; Pierre Pérez; Captain | Stadium: Sérgio Conceição; Referee: Jean-Luc Rebollal (France) |

2002

| 2 June 2002 RWC Qualifying | Spain | 34 - 21 | Portugal | Madrid |
| | Try: Álvar Enciso; Noé Macías; Roger Ripol; Steve Tuineau; José Miguel Villaú; Con: Noé Macías (3); Pen: Noé Macías Coach; Tomás García; Captain; Alvar Enciso | HT: 15 - 8 Reference | Try: Rohan Hoffman; Nuno Garvao; Antonio Aguilar; Pen: Martim Tome (2) Coach; Tomaz Morais; Captain; Rohan Hoffman | Stadium: Central; Referee: Dominique Parrini (France) |

| 3 March 2002 European Nations Cup | Portugal | 13 - 10 | Spain | Caldas da Rainha |
| | Try: Antonio Aguilar; Antonio Cunha; Pen: Rohan Hoffman Coach Captain; Rohan Hoffman | HT: 5 - 5 Reference | Try: Fernando de la Calle; Carlos Souto Coach; Tomás García; Captain; Álvar Enciso | Stadium: Complexo Desportivo; Referee: Jean-Christophe Gastou (France) |

2001

| 4 March 2001 European Nations Cup | Spain | 31 - 15 | Portugal | Madrid |
| | Try: Carlos Souto; Antonio León; Álvar Enciso; Con: Andrei Kovalenco (2); Pen: Andrei Kovalenco (4) Coach; Tomás García; Captain; Antonio León | HT: 12 - 6 Reference | Pen: Frank Cather (4); Drop: Frank Cather Coach; Evan Crawford; Captain; Pedro Vieira | Stadium: Central; Referee: Nicholas Lasaga (France) |

2000

| 20 February 2000 European Nations Cup | Portugal | 21 - 19 | Spain | Lisbon |
| | Pen: Nuno Mourao (4); Thierry Teixeira (3) Coach; Evan Crawford; Captain; Joaquim Ferreira | HT: 12 - 9 Reference | Try: Alfonso Mata; Con: Andrei Kovalenco; Pen: Andrei Kovalenco (4) Coach; Tomás García; Captain; José Ignacio Zapatero | Stadium: Universitário; Referee: Daniel Gillet (France) |

1998

| 2 December 1998 RWC Qualifying | Portugal | 17 - 21 | Spain | Edinburgh |
| | Try: Thierry Teixeira; Rohan Hoffman; Con: Thierry Teixeira; Nuno Mourao; Pen: Thierry Teixeira Coach; Joao Paulo Bessa; Captain; Joaquim Ferreira | HT: 10 - 12 Reference | Pen: Andrei Kovalenco (6); Drop: Fernando Díez Coach; Alfonso Feijoo; Captain; Alberto Malo | Stadium: Murrayfield; Referee: Steve Lander (England) |

| 10 May 1998 RWC Qualifying | Spain | 33 - 22 | Portugal | Elche |
| | Try: Daniel García; Ferrán Velazco; Con: Andrei Kovalenco; Pen: Andrei Kovalenco (7) Coach; Alfonso Feijoo; Captain; Jaime Gutiérrez | HT: 12 - 17 Reference | Try: Nuno Mourao; Manuel Sommer; Miguel Portela; Con: Nuno Mourao (2); Pen: Nuno Mourao Coach; Joao Paulo Bessa; Captain; Joaquim Ferreira | Stadium: Martínez Valero; Referee: Jean-Christophe Gastou (France) |

1997

| 11 May 1997 FIRA Tournament | Spain | 25 - 18 | Portugal | Madrid |
| | Try: Jaime Gutiérrez; Carlos Souto; Francisco Puertas; Con: Unai Aurrekoetxea (2); Pen: Unai Aurrekoetxea (2) Coach; Alfonso Feijoo; Captain; Jaime Gutiérrez | HT: 8 - 15 Reference | Try: Miguel Portela; Joao Bento; Con: Nuno Mourao; Pen: Nuno Mourao (2) Coach; Joao Paulo Bessa; Captain; Jose Carlos Pires | Stadium: Central; Referee: Rossano Faccioli (Italy) |

1996

| 10 November 1996 Test Match | Spain | 31 - 20 | Portugal | Madrid |
| | Try: Alberto Socías; Oriol Ripol; Carlos Souto; Con: Xabier Guerediaga (2); Pen: Xabier Guerediaga (4) Coach; Bryce Bevin; Captain; Jaime Gutiérrez | HT: 25 - 7 Reference | Try: Alexandre Lima (2); Con: Nuno Mourao (2); Pen: Nuno Mourao (2) Coach; Joao Paulo Bessa; Captain; Nuno Mourao | Stadium: Central; Referee: Joel Jutge (France) |

1995

| 22 April 1995 FIRA Trophy | Portugal | 15 - 50 | Spain | Lisbon |
| | Try: Pedro Murinelo; Antonio Esteves; Con: José María Vilar Gomes; Pen: José María Vilar Gomes Coach; Joao Paulo Bessa; Captain; Nuno Durao | HT: 3 - 14 Reference | Try: Daniel Sáenz (2); Penalty Try; José Miguel Villaú; Alejandro Miño; Pablo Martín (2); Francisco Puertas; Con: Xabier Guerediaga (4); Francisco Puertas Coach; Bryce Bevin; Captain; Jaime Gutiérrez | Stadium: Universitário; Referee: Daniel Dartigeas (France) |

1994

| 28 May 1994 RWC Qualifying | Spain | 35 - 19 | Portugal | Madrid |
| | Try: Álvar Enciso; Jerónimo Hernández-Gil; Francisco Puertas; Roque Robles; Con: Francisco Puertas; Unai Aurrekoetxea (2); Pen: Francisco Puertas (3) Coach; Bryce Bevin; Captain; Jaime Gutiérrez | HT: 14 - 6 | Try: Rodrigo Castro Pereira; Pedro Murinelo; Pen: José María Vilar Gomes (3) Coach; Andrew Cushing; Captain | Stadium: Central; Referee: Toshiyuki Asega (Japan) |

1993

| 16 May 1993 RWC Qualifying - FIRA Trophy | Portugal | 15 - 37 | Spain | Lisbon |
| | Pen: Joao Queimado (5) Coach; Andrew Cushing; Captain; Joao Queimado | HT: ? - ? | Try: Julio Álvarez; Jon Azkargorta; Jon Etxeberría; José Ángel Hermosilla; Gabriel Rivero; Marc Ventura; Con: Javier Díaz Paternaín; Francisco Puertas; Drop: Francisco Puertas Coach; Gérard Murillo; Captain; Julio Álvarez | Stadium: Universitário; Referee: Mircea Paraschivescu (Romania) |

1990

| 28 October 1990 FIRA Trophy 2 | Spain | 29 - 6 | Portugal | Seville |
| | Try: Jon Azkargorta; Javier Díaz Paternaín; Penalty Try; Daniel Sáenz; Con: Ramón Blanco; Javier Díaz Paternaín; Pen: Ramón Blanco (3) Coach; Gérard Murillo; Captain; Julio Álvarez | HT: 9 - 0 Reference | Pen: José María Vilar Gomes (2) Coach; Olgario Borges; Captain; Joao Queimado | Stadium: CAR La Cartuja; Referee: Jean-Claude Doulcet (France) |

1984

| 10 March 1984 FIRA Trophy 2 | Portugal | 6 - 6 | Spain | Lisbon |
| | Pen: Joao Queimado; Drop: Joao Queimado Coach; Joao Paulo Bessa; Captain; Bernardo Marques Pinto | HT: 0 - 6 Reference | Pen: Luis Núñez Doval (2) Coach; Ángel Luis Jiménez; Captain; Antonio Machuca | Stadium: Universitário; Referee: Sergio Tiboni (Italy) |

1983

| 26 March 1983 FIRA Trophy 2 | Spain | 25 - 4 | Portugal | Madrid |
| | Try: José Tormo; José Antonio Egido; Carlos Oteo; Gabriel Rivero; Con: Luis Núñez Doval (3); Pen: Luis Núñez Doval Coach; Jesús Linares; Captain; Ángel Luis García | HT: 6 - 4 Reference | Try: Luis Reis Coach; Joao Paulo Bessa; Captain; Bernardo Marques Pinto | Stadium: Vallehermoso; Referee: Daniel Roelands (Belgium) |

1982

| 28 March 1982 FIRA Trophy 2 | Portugal | 13 - 32 | Spain | Lisbon |
| | Try: Antonio Ferreira; Pen: Luis Carlos Costa (3) Coach Captain | HT: 10 - 16 Reference | Try: Con: Pen: Coach; Francisco Sacristán; Captain; Manolo Moriche | Stadium: Universitário |

1970

| 20 December 1970 FIRA Nations Cup 2 | Spain | 17 - 0 | Portugal | Madrid |
| | Try: Francisco Bueno; José María Epalza; Enrique Font; Juan Escoda (2); Con: Alfonso Alonso-LasHeras Coach; Gérard Murillo; Captain; Luis Mocoroa | HT: 8 - 0 Reference | Coach Captain; Pedro Lynce | Stadium: Central; Referee: Daumerqu (France) |

1969

| 23 March 1969 FIRA Nations Cup 2 | Portugal | 11 - 15 | Spain | Barreiro |
| | Try: Francisco Nobre; Con: Francisco Lucena; Pen: Francisco Lucena (2) Coach; Luis Miramon; Captain; Carlos Pardal | HT: 8 - 9 Reference | Try: José María Epalza; Luis Matutano (2); Pen: Enrique Font; Juan Bosco Coach; Alfredo Calzada; Captain; Javier Cortázar | Stadium: Alfredo da Silva; Referee: Audrey (France) |

1968

| 31 March 1968 FIRA Nations Cup 2 | Spain | 14 - 5 | Portugal | Madrid |
| | Try: Alfonso Mújica; Con: Alfonso Mújica; Pen: Alfonso Mújica (2); Jorge Matons Coach: Alfredo Calzada; Captain: Javier Cortázar | HT: 9 - 0 Reference | Try: José Nunes da Silva; Con: Antonio Branco Coach: Luis Miramon; Captain: Raul Martins | Stadium: Central; Referee: Luigi Tognini (Italy) |

1967

| 26 March 1967 Test Match | Portugal | 5 - 0 | Spain | Lisbon |
| | Try: Luis Lynce; Con: Manuel Castro Pereira Coach; Luis Miramon; Captain; Manuel Castro Pereira | HT: 0 - 0 Reference | Coach; Alberto Serena; Captain; Javier Cortázar | Stadium: O Restelo; Referee: ? |

1966

| 27 March 1966 FIRA Nations Cup 2 | Spain | 3 - 9 | Portugal | Madrid |
| | Try: Con: Pen: Coach; Arnaldo Griñó; Captain | HT: - Reference | Try: Alberto Quadrio (2); Drop: Pedro Lynce Coach; Luis Miramon; Captain; Rodolfo Begonha | Stadium: Central; Referee: Charles Durand (France) |

1965

| 1 May 1965 Test Match | Portugal | 9 - 12 | Spain | Lisbon |
| | Try: Domingos Vicente; Carlos Nobre; Bruno Monteiro Coach Captain; Antonio Carqueijeiro | HT: 3 - 3 Reference | Try: Con: Pen: Coach; Ramón Rabassa; Captain | Stadium: O Restelo; Referee: R. Erlier (France) |

1954

| 5 April 1954 FIRA European Cup | Spain | 23 - 0 | Portugal | Madrid |
| | Try: Jorge Juan Cadelláns; David Compañón; José Luis Rivas (2); Jaime Olle; Con: Martín Corominas; Pen: Jorge Hernández Bravo (2) Coach; Juan Vázquez; Captain | HT: 15 - 0 Reference | Coach; Afonso Maia Loureiro; Captain; Americo Caetano Nunes | Stadium: Central; Referee: Fernand Sampieri (France) |

1936

| 28 March 1936 Test Match | Spain | 16 - 9 | Portugal | Madrid |
| | Try: Ramón Resines; Carlos Puga; Gonzalo Marín; Con: Carlos Puga; Gonzalo Marín; Pen: Gonzalo Marín Coach; César Augusto Palomino Carreño; Captain; Carlos García San Miguel | HT: 13 - 0 Reference | Try: Álvaro Vieira; Con: Manuel Silva Marques; Drop: Eduardo Branco Coach; Manuel da Cruz Coelho; Captain; Francisco Xavier de Araújo | Stadium: Chamartín, Referee: Francisco Martínez Larrañaga (Spain) |

1935

| 13 April 1935 Test Match | Portugal | 5 - 6 | Spain | Lisbon |
| | Try: Vasco Cayola; Con: Eduardo Branco Coach Captain; Francisco Xavier Araújo | HT: 0 - 3 Reference | Try: Fernando Sabras; Mariano Cruz Coach; José Hermosa; Captain; Carlos García San Miguel | Stadium: Amoreiras; Referee: Alberto Freitas (Portugal) |

== Other results ==
2005

| 12 October 2005 Friendly | Spain XV | 27 - 17 | Portugal XV | Madrid |
| | Try: Esteban Roqué; Jorge Prieto; César Sempere; Con: Esteban Roqué (2); Andrei Kovalenco; Pen: Esteban Roqué (2) Coach; Ged Glynn; Captain; Ferrán Velazco | HT: 20 - 3 | Try: Cristian Spachuk; Duarte Cardoso Pinto; Antonio Aguilar; Con: Diogo Mateus Coach; Tomaz Morais; Captain | Stadium: Central; Referee: Jean Marie Piraveau (France) |

1989

| 18 March 1989 Friendly | Portugal | 14 - 14 | Spain B | Lousã |
| | Try: Antonio Moita; P. Correlo; Pen: Miguel Pardal; Drop: Miguel Pardal Coach Captain; L. Filipe | HT: 3 - 4 | Try: David Torres Morote; Alejandro Ruiz Eguinoa; Pen: Ernesto Candau; Drop: Ernesto Candau Coach; Jesús Marquez; Captain; Carlos Puigbert | Referee: Marcelo Firpo (Argentina) |

1986

| 8 February 1986 Friendly | Spain B | 10 - 9 | Portugal | Central |
| | Try: Isidro Oller; Pen: Paul Mielgo (2) Coach; José María Epalza; Captain; Felipe Blanco | HT: 0 - 0 | Try: Bernard do Pinto; Con: Joao Queimado; Pen: Joao Queimado Coach; Joao Paulo Bessa; Captain; Bernard do Pinto | Attendance: Madrid; Referee: Juan Hernández de la Paz (Spain) |

1985

| 16 February 1985 Friendly | Portugal | 24 - 3 | Spain U23 | Porto |
| | Try: Con: Pen: Coach Captain; Bernard do Pinto | HT: 14 - 3 | Pen: Francisco Javier Puyuelo Coach; José Antonio Vélez; Captain; Domingo Baeza | Referee: Santos (Portugal) |

== See also ==
- Rugby Europe Championship
- Portugal–Spain relations
