= 1929 Italian Rugby Union Championship =

- Countries: Italy
- Number of teams: 6 teams
- Champions: Ambrosiana
- Runners-up: Lazio

The 1929 Italian Rugby Union Championship ("Campionato Italiano di Rugby") was the first edition of the tournament.

Six clubs contested the tiles, won by Ambrosiana that became famous after as Amatori Rugby Milano . At those time it was the rugby section of Ambrosiana-Inter F.C.

The opening match should be between Michelin - Ambrosiana on February 12, 1929, at the Velodrome Humbert I, in Turin, but was delayed for bad weather conditions,.

The finals matches were played between Ambrosiana and Lazio: in the first match at Stadio Nazionale PNF, Lazio won 5–0, but in the return match won the "Ambrosiana" 10–3.

In the tie-break match on neutral ground of Bologna, Ambrosiana won 3–0.

== Team participating ==
=== Girone A ===
- Ambrosiana
- Leonessa Brescia
- Michelin Torino

=== Girone B ===
- Bologna
- Lazio (Rome)
- Leoni San Marco (Padua)

== Formula ==
The six teams were divided in two pool of three. The winner of each pool qualified to finals

== Results ==
Pool A
19-0	Ambrosiana - Michelin Torino	24–0
0-0	Michelin Torino - XV Leonessa	0–3
17-0	Ambrosiana - XV Leonessa	6-0

Pool B
6-0	Lazio - Leoni San Marco	20–6
9-3	Lazio - Bologna	6-0
6-6	Leoni San Marco - Bologna	0–3

== Ranking ==
=== Pool A ===
Pos	Team	Pld	W	D	L	PF	PA	PD	Pts
1	Ambrosiana	4	4	0	0	66	0	+66	8
2	Leonessa Brescia	4	1	1	2	3	23	−20	2
3	Michelin Turin	4	0	1	3	0	46	−46	1

=== Pool B ===
Pos	Team	Pld	W	D	L	PF	PA	PD	Pts
1	Lazio	4	4	0	0	41	9	+32	8
2	Bologna	4	1	1	2	12	21	−9	2
3	Leoni San Marco	4	0	1	3	12	35	−23	1

== Finals ==
7 April 1929

Lazio	5-0	Ambrosiana
Try: 44' Vinci II; Con: 44' Bigi

14 April 1929

Ambrosiana	10-3	Lazio
Try: 52' Vismara, 60' Bauman; Con: 52' e 60' Maffioli		Try: 36' Vinci IV

=== Barrage ===
15 June 1929

Ambrosiana	3-0	Lazio
Try: 36' Caccianiga

Referee: Lafitte (FRA)

== Verditcs ==
- Ambrosiana champion of Italy (1st title)

== Bibliography ==
- Volpe, Francesco; Pacitti, Paolo (2008). Rugby 2009. Roma: ZESI.
