= Saetti =

Saetti is an Italian surname. Notable people with the surname include:

- Bruno Saetti (1902–1984), Italian painter
- Roberto Saetti (born 1967), Italian rugby union player
