= Ion Gheorghe =

Ion Gheorghe may refer to:

- Ion Gheorghe (footballer) (born 1999), Romanian footballer
- Ion Gheorghe (general) (1893–1957), Romanian general
- Ion Gheorghe (poet) (1935–2021), Romanian poet
- Ion Gheorghe Duca (1879–1933), Romanian politician and prime minister
- Ion Gheorghe Ionescu (born 1938), Romanian footballer
- Ion Gheorghe Iosif Maurer (1902–2000), Romanian communist politician and lawyer

== See also ==
- Gheorghe Ion (1923–2009), Romanian general
- Gheorghe Ion (born 1960), Romanian rugby union footballer
