= Jon Azkargorta =

Spain international rugby union player (born 1963)

- Born: Jon Azkargorta Aretxabala; 3 May 1963 (age 63) Algorta, Basque Country, Spain
- Height: 1.75 m (5 ft 9 in)
- Weight: 75 kg (165 lb)

Rugby union career
- Position(s): Centre, Fullback
Senior career
Years	Team	Apps	(Points)
1981-2003	Getxo Artea RT		
International career
Years	Team	Apps	(Points)
1982-1994	Spain	76	(22)

Jon Azkargorta Aretxabala (born in Algorta, Getxo, on 3 May 1963) is a Spanish former rugby union player. He played as centre or as fullback. He was nicknamed "Azkar".

== Career ==
Azkargorta always played for Getxo Artea RT from his hometown. He formed part the only División de Honor title on the club's cabinet, in the 1992–93 season, and several Copa del Rey titles. In 1986 he was one of the members of the first Spain sevens team. He is the second player with most caps (76) in the story of the Spain national team, only after Francisco Puertas. He was first capped against Argentina in Madrid, on 23 November 1982 and his last cap was against Wales national rugby union team on 21 May 1994, also played at Estadio Nacional Complutense.

Along with Asier Altuna, Iñaki Laskurain, Julio Álvarez, Fran Puertas, Javier Díaz Paternain, Alberto Malo, José Prieto and José Ignacio Zapatero, Azkargorta was also part of the Spain team which won the bronze medal at the 1993 Mediterranean Games coached by Gérard Murillo.

== Personal life ==
Azkargorta is a physical teacher at the University of the Basque Country.
