= Adrian Ion =

Romania international rugby union player

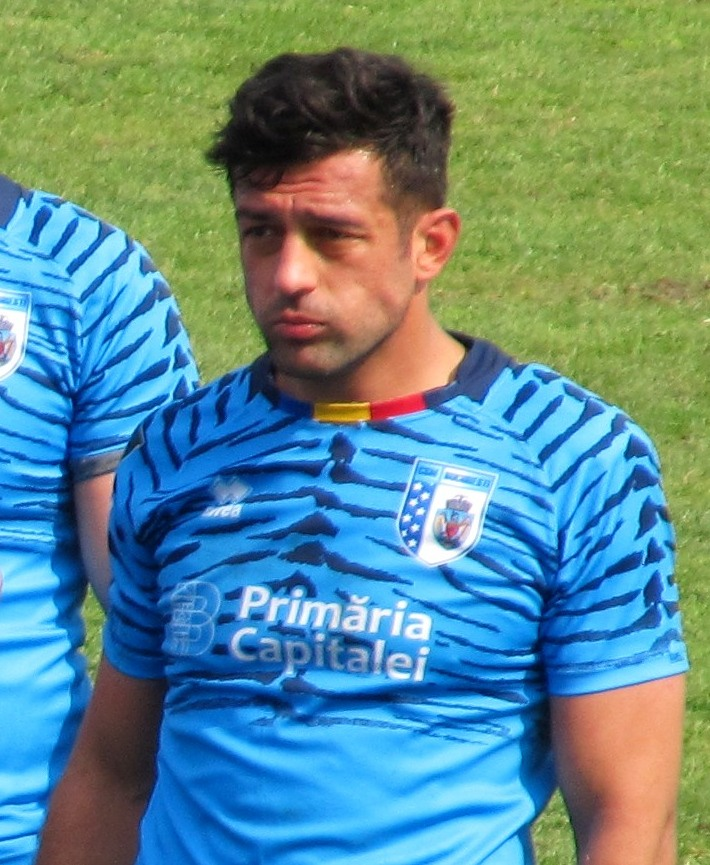
- Adrian Ion playing for CSM București during the 2019 Cupa României Final
- Full name: Adrian Ion
- Born: 9 August 1986 (age 40) București, Romania
- Height: 1.88 m (6 ft 2 in)
- Weight: 102 kg (16 st 1 lb; 225 lb)
- University: Romanian-American University

Rugby union career
- Position: Flanker
- Current team: CSM București
Senior career
Years	Team	Apps	(Points)
2005–2013	Dinamo București	200	(50)
2013-2015	Farul Constanța	40	(30)
2015–2020	CSM București	300	(65)
- Correct as of 9 March 2019
Provincial / State sides
Years	Team	Apps	(Points)
2011–2014	București Wolves	20	(10)
- Correct as of 23 March 2019 Tomitanii Constanta
International career
Years	Team	Apps	(Points)
2012–2020	Romania	25	(15)
- Correct as of 9 March 2019

Adrian Ion (born 9 August 1986) is a Romanian rugby union footballer. He plays the position of flanker.

His father Gheorghe nicknamed Tarzan was also a professional rugby player.

== Club career ==
He currently plays for and captains CSM București, in the Romanian SuperLiga, transferring in 2013 from Farul Constanța. Before playing for Farul, Ion played for Bucharest side, Dinamo.

== International career ==
Ion also plays for The Oaks making his international debut in a 2012 test match against Los Leones.

In 2018 he was recalled for the national team for the game against Portugal and November Tests.

In 2019 Ion also was selected for The Oaks and played in Europe Rugby Championship.

Ion captained The Oaks in the wins against Russia and Belgium. Both games count for Europe Rugby Championship 2019 when they finish on 3rd position.
