= Giambattista Croci =

Italy international rugby union player (born 1965)

- Born: Giambattista Croci; 28 July 1965 (age 61) San Benedetto del Tronto, Italy
- Height: 6 ft 7 in (2.01 m)
- Weight: 220 lb (100 kg)

Rugby union career
- Position: Lock
Senior career
| Years | Team | Apps | (Points) |
| 1983-1988 | Sambenedettese | | |
| 1988-1989 | Rugby Rovigo | | |
| 1990-1998 | Milano | | |
| 1998-2000 | Rugby Calvisano | | |
International career
| Years | Team | Apps | (Points) |
| 1990-1998 | Italy | 24 | (13) |

Giambattista Croci (born 28 July 1965) is an Italian former rugby union player. He played as a lock.

== Career ==
Croci first played at Sambenedettese, appearing at the first team at 1983/84, in the Serie C. During a stint at Interforze di Napoli, during his military service, he was noticed and assigned to Rugby Rovigo, in 1988/89. The apex of his team career was achieved at Amatori Rugby Milano, where he played from 1989/90 to 1997/98, winning 4 Italian Championship titles, in 1990/91, 1992/93, 1994/95 and 1995/96, and the Cup of Italy in 1994/95. His final team was Rugby Calvisano, from 1998/99 to 1999/2000, where he finished his career, aged 34 years old.

Croci had 24 caps for Italy, scoring 3 tries, for an aggregate of 13 points. His first game was on 30 September 1990, in a 30–6 win over Spain, in Rovigo, for the 1991 Rugby World Cup qualifiers. He was called for the 1991 Rugby World Cup, playing in all three games, but never scoring. He was called once more for the 1995 Rugby World Cup but this time he didn't play. He was a decisive player in the historic 40–32 win over France at Grenoble, that gave Italy their first ever title of the 1995–1997 FIRA Trophy, scoring the third try at 56 minutes at a moment in which the game was levelled 20-20. Italian journalist Corrado Sanucci described it as the try that "brought Italian rugby from local soil to consecrate it at the BBC".

Croci's last game for Italy was at the 23–20 loss to Wales, on 7 February 1998, in Llanelli, in a tour, aged 32 years old.
