= Massimo Ravazzolo =

Massimo Ravazzolo (born 5 September 1972 in Calvisano) is a former Italian rugby union player and a current coach. He played as a wing and as a fullback.

He played for Rugby Calvisano, from 1988/89 to 2005/06, where he had his debut at first team aged only 16 years old. He won the National Championship in 2004/05 and the Cup of Italy in 2003/04. He later would play for Gran Ducato Parma Rugby (2006/07), Rugby Brescia (2006/07-2008/09) and Rugby Calvisano (2009/10-2010/11), his last team.

He had 23 caps for Italy, from 1993 to 1997, scoring 3 tries, 15 points on aggregate. He was called for the 1995 Rugby World Cup, playing a single match and remaining scoreless.

Ravazzolo after finishing his playing career, became a coach. He was the coach of Rugby Reggio in 2011/12.
