= Piermassimiliano Dotto =

Italian rugby union player

Piermassimiliano Dotto (Treviso, 28 February 1970 - Volpago del Montello, 25 October 2012), also known as Piero Dotto, was an Italian rugby union player. Dotto played as a fullback and later as a fly-half.

Dotto played most of his career at Benetton Treviso, from 1988/89 to 1999/2000, where he won 5 National Championship titles, in 1988/89, 1991/92, 1996/97, 1997/98 and 1998/99, and the Cup of Italy in 1997/98. He later would play for Silea (2000/01-2002/03), San Marco Rugby Club (2004/05-2005/06) and ADS Rugby Casale (2006/07-2009/10), where he would finish his career, aged 40 years old.

He had 4 caps for Italy, from 1993 to 1994, scoring 3 tries, 15 points on aggregate. French coach Georges Coste called him for the 1995 Rugby World Cup, but he never played.

He died aged 42 years old of a heart attack.
