= Mauro Dal Sie =

Italian rugby union player and coach

Mauro Dal Sie (born 13 October 1967 in San Donà di Piave) is a former Italian rugby union player and a current coach. He played as a prop.

Dal Sie first played at Amatori Rugby San Donà, where he was in the first team from 1985/86 to 1995/96. He then moved to Benetton Treviso, where he played from 1987/88 to 1999/2000. He won 3 titles of the Italian Championship, in 1996/97, 1997/98 and 1998/99, and the Cup of Italy, in 1997/98. He returned to Amatori Rugby San Donà, where he remained the final seasons of his career, finished in 2002/03.

Dal Sie had 7 caps for Italy, from 1993 to 1996, without scoring. He was called for the 1995 Rugby World Cup but never left the bench.

He has been the coach of San Donà since 2003/04.
