= Stefano Barba =

Italy international rugby union player

- Born: Stefano Barba; 10 January 1964 (age 62) Rome, Italy
- Height: 1.75 m (5 ft 9 in)
- Weight: 74.8 kg (165 lb)

Rugby union career
- Position: Centre
Amateur team(s)
Years	Team	Apps	(Points)
1982-1983	CUS Roma Rugby		
1983-1985	Petrarca Rugby		
1986-1990	CUS Roma Rugby		
1990-1993	Amatori Rugby Milano		
1993-1994	CUS Roma Rugby		
1994-1995	Rugby Roma Olimpic		
Senior career
Years	Team	Apps	(Points)
1997-1999	S.S. Lazio Rugby 1927		
International career
Years	Team	Apps	(Points)
1985-1993	Italy	35	(30)

Stefano Barba (born Rome, 10 January 1964) is a former Italian rugby union player and a current coach. He played as a centre.

== Playing career ==
Barba played for CUS Roma Rugby (1982/83), Petrarca Rugby (1983/84-1984/85), where he won 2 Italian Championships, CUS Roma Rugby (1985/86-1989/90), Amatori Rugby Milano (1990/91-1992/93), winning the Italian Championship for 2 titles, in 1990/91 and 1992/93, CUS Roma Rugby (1993/94), Rugby Roma Olimpic (1994/95) and S.S. Lazio Rugby 1927 (1997/98-1998/99). He left competition aged 35 years old.

== International career ==
He had 35 caps for Italy, from 1985 to 1993, scoring 7 tries, 30 points on aggregate. He was called for the 1987 Rugby World Cup, playing in two games and remaining scoreless, and for the 1991 Rugby World Cup, playing once again in two games and scoring a try.

== Coaching career ==
After his retirement, he was the head coach of S.S. Lazio Rugby 1927, from 1998/99 to 2001/02. He also would be in charge of Italy U-17 national team, from 2003/04 to 2004/05.
