= Thierry Devergie =

France international rugby union & league footballer

- Born: 27 July 1966 (age 60) Marseille, Provence-Alpes-Côte d'Azur, France
- Height: 6 ft 6 in (1.98 m)
- Weight: 260 lb (118 kg)

Rugby union career
- Position: Lock
Senior career
Years	Team	Apps	(Points)
1994–95	RC Nîmes		
1995	FC Grenoble		
1997–98	Neath RFC		
1998	Bristol Shoguns		
1998-99	CA Brive		
1999-00	CA Bordeaux-Bègles Gironde		
International career
Years	Team	Apps	(Points)
1988–92	France	17	(0)
- Rugby league career

Playing information
Club
Years	Team	Pld	T	G	FG	P
1995–96	Paris Saint-Germain

Thierry Devergie (born 27 July 1966 in Marseille) is a French former rugby union & rugby league footballer. He played as a lock and as a flanker. He also had a brief stint as a professional rugby league footballer.

== Career ==
Devergie played for RC Nîmes and for FC Grenoble (1994/95) in rugby union. He played a season for Paris Saint-Germain Rugby League (1995/96), returning to his previous code afterwards. He played for the Welsh team Neath RFC in the season of 1997/98, moving to Bristol Shoguns, in England the same season. Returning to France he would represent CA Brive (1998/99) and CA Bordeaux-Bègles Gironde (1999/2000). He finished his career aged 33 years old.

Devergie had 17 caps for France, from 1988 to 1992, without ever scoring. He had 4 caps at the 1990 Five Nations Championship. He was selected for the 1991 Rugby World Cup but never left the bench.
