= Alessandro Bottacchiari =

Italian rugby union player

Alessandro Bottacchiari (born Foligno, 8 November 1955) is a former Italian rugby union player. He played as a flanker.

He played the most significant time of his career at L'Aquila Rugby, from 1986/87 to 1993/94. He won the National Championship of Excellence in 1993/94.

He had 6 caps for Italy, from 1991 to 1992, scoring 2 tries, 9 points on aggregate. He was called for the 1991 Rugby World Cup, where he had his first game, at the 21–31 loss to New Zealand, at 13 October 1991, in Leicester, in his single presence at the competition. He was 35 years old, becoming one of the oldest players to have his first cap for the Italy side. He had his last cap at the 22–3 win over Romania, at 1 October 1992, in Rome, for the 1992–93 FIRA Preliminary Tournament, in a game where he scored a try.
