= Moreno Trevisiol =

Moreno Trevisiol (born 29 April 1963 in Treviso) is a former Italian rugby union player and coach, and a current sports manager. He played as a hooker.

Trevisiol did all his career at Benetton Treviso, from 1981/82 to 1998/99. He won 6 titles of the Italian Championship, in 1982/83, 1988/89, 1991/92, 1996/97, 1997/98 and 1998/99, and the Cup of Italy, in 1997/98.

He had 8 caps for Italy, from 1988 to 1994, without scoring. He was called for the 1995 Rugby World Cup, but didn't play.

After finishing his player career, he became a coach, being in charge of Riviera (2004/05), Venezia Mestre (2005/06-2006/07) and once again Riviera (2007/08 and early 2008/09). He was sacked due to bad results in October 2008.

He was elected federal counselor of the Italian Rugby Federation in 2004, being reelected in 2008.
