= Pierpaolo Pedroni =

Italian rugby union player, rugby union referee and sports commentator

Pierpaolo Pedroni (20 May 1964, in Cremona – 23 June 2009, in Milan) was an Italian rugby union player, rugby union referee and sports commentator. He played as a lock and as a number eight.

Pedroni played most of his career at Amatori Rugby Milano, where he made his debut in the first category in 1982/83 and would play until 1996/97. He spent a brief stint at SU Agen in the autumn of 1997, returning soon to Amatori Rugby Milano, where he would stay until 1999/2000. During his time at Milano, he won 4 Italian Championship titles, in 1990/91, 1991/92, 1994/95 and 1995/96, and the Cup of Italy, in 1994/95. He spent his final season at Crociati Parma Rugby FC in 1999/2000, finishing his career at 36 years old.

Pedroni had 25 caps for Italy, from 1989 to 1996, scoring 2 tries, 10 points on aggregate. He was called up for the 1995 Rugby World Cup, playing in three games but without scoring.

He decided to take the referee course after finishing his player career and became habilitated as a referee in 2004, for the Series B. He was also a sports commentator for Eurosport and Italian television.

He died unexpectedly on 23 June 2009 from a heart attack, aged 45 years old.
