= Franco Properzi =

Italy international rugby union player

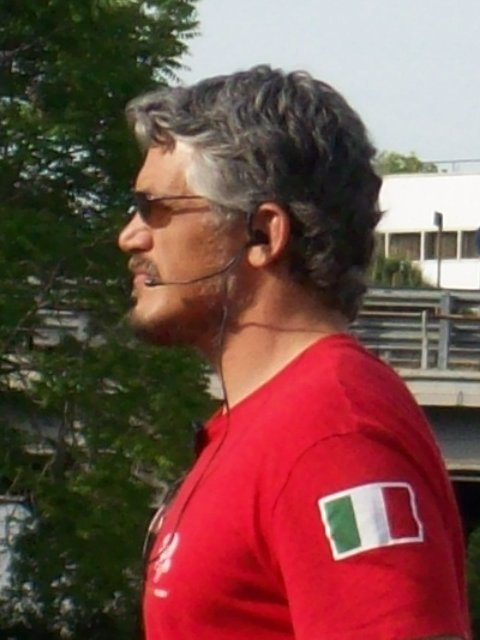
- Born: 4 November 1965 (age 61) Dehradun, India
- Height: 6 ft 2 in (1.88 m)
- Weight: 247 lb (112 kg; 17.6 st)

Rugby union career
- Position: Prop
International career
Years	Team	Apps	(Points)
1990–2001	Italy	54	(15)

Franco Properzi Curti (born 4 November 1965) is an Italian professional rugby union coach and former player who played as a prop.

He was born in Dehradun, India, due to his father work there. He returned to Italy with his family, starting his rugby player career at Amatori Rugby Milano, where he would play from 1984/85 to 1997/98. During his presence at Milano, he won 4 titles of the Italian Premiership, in 1990/91, 1992/93, 1994/95 and 1995/96, and the Cup of Italy, in 1994/95. Properzi moved to Benetton Treviso in 1998/99, where he would spend the rest of his career, finished in 2002/03, at 37 years old. He was also successful there, winning league titles in 1998/99, 2000/01 and 2002/03.

Properzi also played for the Italy national team, winning 53 caps between 1990 and 2001 and scoring three tries. He was named in the Italy squad for three Rugby World Cups. In the 1991 Rugby World Cup, he played in all the three games, in the 1995 Rugby World Cup, he was used in all the three games once again, and at the 1999 Rugby World Cup, he played two games.

The highest point of his international career was the title of the European Nations Cup for the 1997 edition, when Italy beat France 40–32 on 22 March 1997.

Properzi won his last caps for Italy at the age of 35 at the 2001 Six Nations Championship, being used in three games.

He has been assistant coach since the finish of his playing career. He was first assistant coach of Benetton Rugby Treviso (2004/05-2009/10) and he is currently of Mogliano Rugby, since 2010/11.
