= Javier Díaz =

Javier Díaz may refer to:

- Javier Díaz (swimmer) (born 1979), retired Mexican swimmer
- Javier Díaz (athlete) (born 1976), Spanish long-distance runner
- Javier Díaz (rugby union) (born 1995), Argentine rugby union player

== See also ==
- Javi Díaz (born 1997), Spanish footballer
