= José Santamarina =

Argentine rugby union player (born 1963)

- Born: José María Santamarina; May 21, 1963 (age 63) San Miguel de Tucumán
- Notable relative: Mario Santamarina (grandfather)

Rugby union career
- Position: Number 8
Senior career
Years	Team	Apps	(Points)
1983-2000	Tucumán Rugby Club		
International career
Years	Team	Apps	(Points)
1991-1995	Argentina	23	(9)

José María Santamarina (born 21 May 1963 in San Miguel de Tucumán) is a former Argentine rugby union player. He played as a number eight. He is the grandson of Mario Santamarina the introducer of rugby in Tucumán.

Santamarina played his entire career at Tucumán Rugby Club, from 1983/84 to 1999/2000, where he won 8 titles of the Torneo del Noroeste of Argentina, in 1988, 1989, 1990, 1991, 1992, 1993, 1995 and 2000. He was also finalist of the Nacional de Clubes in 1993.

He had 23 caps for Argentina, from 1991 to 1995, scoring 2 tries, 9 points on aggregate. He was called for the 1991 Rugby World Cup, playing in three games, and for the 1995 Rugby World Cup, playing again in three games. He never scored in both occasions.
