= Cătălin Sasu =

- Born: 24 January 1968 (age 58) Constanta
- Height: 6 ft 2 in (188 cm)
- Weight: 172 lb (78 kg)
- University: Ovidius University Constanta

Rugby union career
- Position: Wing
International career
| Years | Team | Apps | (Points) |
| 1989–93 | Romania | 9 | (16) |

Cătălin Sasu (born 24 January 1968) is a Romanian former rugby union international who represented Romania in nine Test matches between 1989 and 1993.

A winger, Sasu played most of his domestic rugby with Farul Constanța. In 1991 he represented Romania at the Rugby World Cup, scoring tries against Canada and Fiji, the latter in a famous win. He also competed for Romania in rugby sevens, including at the 1993 Rugby World Cup Sevens.

== See also ==
- List of Romania national rugby union players
