= Carlo Checchinato =

Italy international rugby union player

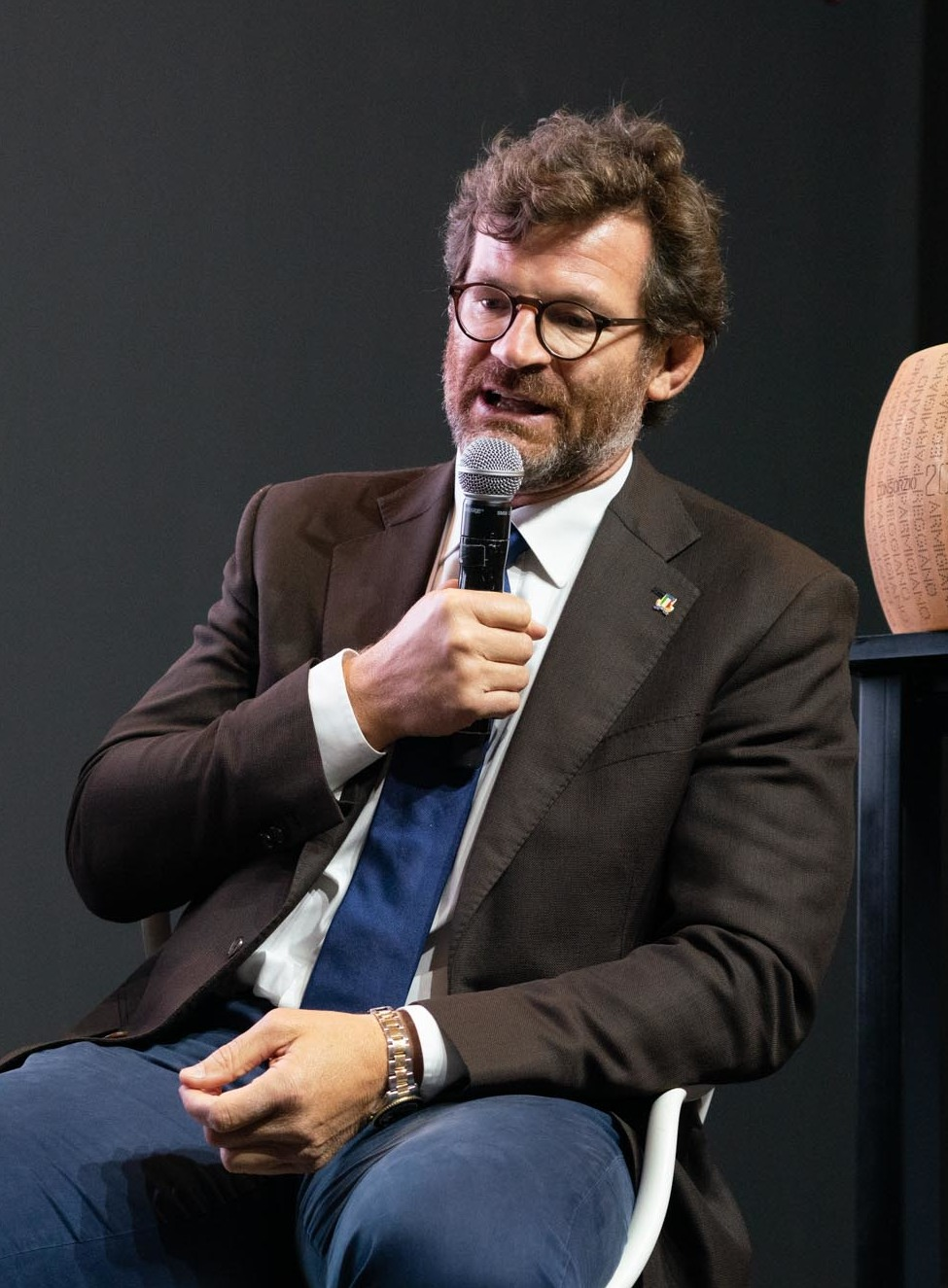
- Checchinato in 2021
- Born: 30 August 1970 (age 56) Adria, Province of Rovigo
- Height: 6 ft 6 in (1.98 m)
- Weight: 242 lb (110 kg; 17 st 4 lb)

Rugby union career
- Position(s): Lock, Number eight
Senior career
Years	Team	Apps	(Points)
1988-1995	Rugby Rovigo		
1995-2005	Benetton Treviso	158	
International career
Years	Team	Apps	(Points)
1990-2004	Italy	83	(105)

Carlo Checchinato (born 30 August 1970 in Adria, Province of Rovigo) is an Italian rugby union former international player, with 83 caps and participated in 4 consecutive Rugby World Cup. He is the sales director for the Italy national team. He was CEO of Zebre Parma between 2021 and 2022.

== Career ==
Checchinato was born in Adria, close to Rovigo. His father, called Giancarlo, was an international lock, being capped for Italy during the 1970s. Following in his father's footsteps, he started to play rugby for Rovigo and made his debut at 18 years old with the senior team in 1900, year in which Rovigo won the Serie A1 Scudetto.

Few months after his club debut, he was called up by Italy to make his international debut again Spain in the FIRA trophy. He was with the Italy national team at the 1991 World Cup, in 1995 in South Africa, in 1999 in Wales and in 2003 in Australia as well as in several tournaments. He earned 83 caps and scored 21 tries in international matches. Checchinato's international try total was an all-time record for forwards until 2007, when it was surpassed by Colin Charvis of Wales.

In 1995 he moved from Rovigo to Benetton Treviso, where he played 158 matches in 10 seasons and won 6 times the Scudetto and twice the Coppa Italia. He normally played lock or number eight.

After his retirement in 2005, he became Team manager for the Italian national team. In 2010 he became Elite Level Director (Direttore per l'Alto Livello) for the Italian Rugby Federation (FIR), in order to manage the relationship between the federation, the senior squad and the two professional clubs (at the time in Celtic League). In 2018, he assumed the role of Sales Director for FIR. Between 2021 and 2022 he was CEO of Zebre Parma, one of the two professional rugby teams in Italy.

== Honours ==
Italy

- 1x FIRA Trophy: 1995-1997

Rovigo

- 1x Serie A1 Scudetto: 1989-90

Benetton Treviso

- 6x Serie A1/Super 10 Scudetto: 1996-97, 1997-98, 1998-99, 2000-01, 2002-03, 2003-04
- 2x Coppa Italia: 1996-97, 2004-05
