= José Miguel Villaú =

- Born: 30 October 1971 (age 55) Sevilla, Andalucía, España
- Height: 6 ft 5 in (1.96 m)
- Weight: 234 lb (106 kg)

Rugby union career
- Position: Lock
Amateur team(s)
Years	Team	Apps	(Points)
- Colegio Aljarafe
Senior career
Years	Team	Apps	(Points)
- Universidad de Sevilla
–	CAR Sevilla		
–	Stade Montois		
International career
Years	Team	Apps	(Points)
1993-2002	Spain	42	(10)

José Miguel Villaú Cabeza (born Sevilla, 30 October 1971) is a Spanish rugby union player. He plays as a lock.

== Career ==
His first international match was against Morocco, at Toulouse, on 28 November 1993. He was part of the 1999 Rugby World Cup roster, playing all the three matches. His last international cap was during a match against Portugal, at Madrid, on 2 June 2002.
