= Roberto Favaro =

Italy international rugby union player

Roberto Favaro (born 9 February 1965 in Venice) is an Italian former rugby union player and a current coach. He played as a lock.

Favaro's career started at Mirano Rugby 1957, where he developed from 1983/84 to 1986/87. He went on a one-season loan to Benetton Treviso, in 1987/88, but was assigned a full contract after this term, remaining in the team until 1996/97. Favaro won 3 titles of the Italian Championship at Treviso, in 1988/89, 1991/92 and 1996/97. He then would play two seasons at Rugby Bologna 1928 (1997/98-1998/99) and two more at Petrarca Padova Rugby (1999/2000-2000/2001). His final team was Mirano Rugby 1957, where he stayed at the end of his career, in 2004/05, aged 40 years old. He was by then already player-coach of the team, which he was from 2003/04 until 2009/10, after 2005/06 only as a coach. He was an assistant coach at Venezia Mestre Rugby FC at 2010/11. He is currently the coach of Associazione Sportiva Ruggers Tarvisium, since 2011/12.

Favaro had 42 caps for Italy, from 1988 to 1996, scoring 1 try, 5 points on aggregate. He was called for the 1991 Rugby World Cup, playing in two games, and for the 1995 Rugby World Cup, once again in two games, but without scoring.
