= Tudor Constantin =

- Born: 17 November 1969 (age 56) Bucharest, Romania
- Height: 6 ft 6 in (198 cm)
- Weight: 266 lb (121 kg)

Rugby union career
- Position: Lock
International career
Years	Team	Apps	(Points)
1992–2002	Romania	17	(10)

Tudor Constantin (born 17 November 1969) is a Romanian former rugby union international who represented Romania in 17 Test matches between 1992 and 2002.

Born in Bucharest, Constantin played as a lock and had the experience early in his career of competing in New Zealand, with Kia Toa RFC. He featured in France's Top 14 competition from 1995 to 2002, playing for Stadoceste Tarbais, Racing Club de France and Bègles-Bordeaux.

Constantin, first capped for Romania in 1992, was the team's captain at the 1999 Rugby World Cup. He missed the World Cup opener against Australia with an ankle injury but returned to lead the side to a win over the United States in Dublin.

Following his retirement, Constantin has remained involved in rugby in an administrative capacity. He has served as president of CS Dinamo București (2006–07) and been manager of the national team (2007–08).

== See also ==
- List of Romania national rugby union players
