= Massimo Giovanelli =

Italy international rugby union player

Massimo Giovanelli (born 1 March 1967 in Noceto) is a former Italian rugby union player. He played as a flanker. He was one of the best Italian rugby players of his generation.

== Club career ==
Giovanelli started his career at the local team of Rugby Noceto Football Club, being promoted to the first category in 1984. He would play there until 1990/91, moving then to Amatori Rugby Milano, which he represented from 1991/92 to 1996/97. It was the most successful time of his career, winning three Italian Championship titles, in 1992/93, 1994/95 and 1995/96, and one Cup of Italy, in 1994/95. He moved to France in 1997, where he would play for Paris Université Club Rugby during one season, moving then to RC Narbonne, where he would stay for the season of 1998/99. Giovanelli returned to Italy, playing then for Rugby Rovigo (1999/2000). He left competition for some years due to an eye problem, but returned for a final spell with Rugby Colomo, where he would play from 2003/04 to 2006/07, finishing his career aged 40.

== International career ==
Giovanelli had 60 caps for Italy, from 1989 to 2000, scoring 4 tries, 19 points in aggregate. He was the captain for 37 caps. His first game was at 30 September 1989, in the 33-9 win over Zimbabwe, in Treviso, in a friendly match, aged 22 years old. He was selected for three Rugby World Cup finals, playing 2 times at the 1991 Rugby World Cup, never being capped at the 1995 Rugby World Cup, and playing three times at the 1999 Rugby World Cup. He was also the captain of Italy in this last presence. He had his last cap for the National Team during his sole presence at the 2000 Six Nations Championship, at 5 February 2000, in the 34-20 win over Scotland, in Rome, that marked his country debut at the competition. His eye injury forced him to leave the national team afterwards.

He was inducted at the World Rugby Museum Wall of Fame in Twickenham on 17 February 2001.

He also graduated in architecture in 2003.
