= José Ignacio Zapatero =

- Born: 25 November 1974 (age 51) Zamora, Spain
- Height: 6 ft 0 in (1.83 m)
- Weight: 240 lb (110 kg)
- Occupation: Gym instructor

Rugby union career
- Position: Prop
Senior career
Years	Team	Apps	(Points)
1993-2003	El Salvador Rugby		
International career
Years	Team	Apps	(Points)
1993-2003	Spain	36	(15)

José Ignacio Zapatero Ferreras (born 25 November 1971 in Zamora) is a Spanish former rugby union player. He plays as a prop.

== Career ==
His first international match was against Italy at Perpignan on 21 June 1993. He was part of the 1999 Rugby World Cup roster. His last international cap was during a match against Romania, at Madrid on 9 March 2003.
