= Roberto Saetti =

Italy international rugby union player

Roberto Saetti (born 27 November 1967 in Padua) is a former Italian rugby union player. He played as flanker and a lock. He is professionally a surgeon in his home city of Padua.

Saetti first played for Belluno Rugby, moving afterwards to Petrarca Padova Rugby, where he spent his entire adult career, from 1985/86 to 1999/2000. He won the National Championship of Excellence twice, in 1985/86 and 1986/87.

He had 19 caps for Italy, from 1988 to 1992, scoring 1 try, 4 points on aggregate. He was called for the 1991 Rugby World Cup, playing in two games.

After his retirement from rugby union, he became a full-time surgeon.
