= Peyo Hontas =

France international rugby union player

- Full name: Pierre Hontas
- Born: 19 July 1966 (age 60) Biarritz, France
- Height: 6 ft 0 in (183 cm)
- Weight: 189 lb (86 kg)

Rugby union career
- Position: Wing
International career
Years	Team	Apps	(Points)
1990–93	France	9	(0)

Pierre "Peyo" Hontas (born 19 July 1966) is a French former international rugby union player.

A native of Biarritz, Hontas was a speedy Biarritz Olympique winger, who excelled in 400 metres races.

Hontas toured New Zealand with France in 1989 and had his ear badly torn in the tour match against Wellington, requiring 25 stitches. He didn't play against the All Blacks and won his first cap in the next year's Five Nations. Capped nine times in total, Hontas appeared in all of France's matches in their winning 1993 Five Nations campaign.

== See also ==
- List of France national rugby union players
