= Edgardo Venturi =

Italy international rugby union player

Edgardo Venturi (born Pieve di Cento, 27 July 1962) is a former Italian rugby union player and a current sports director. He played as wing.

Venturi played for OVA Pieve di Cento, where he first started aged 16, at the Series C, and would play from 1978/79 to 1982/83. He moved then to Rugby Rovigo, where he played from 1983/84 to 1992/93. He won the National Championship of Excellence in 1987/88 and 1989/90. He finished his player career aged 30, to dedicate himself to assurance business.

He had 46 caps for Italy, from 1983 to 1993, scoring 11 tries, 46 points on aggregate. He had his first game at the 37–9 win over Canada, at 1 July 1983, in Toronto, in a tour. He was called for the 1991 Rugby World Cup, playing a single game and remaining scoreless. His last game was at the 12–14 loss to France XV, at 20 February 1993, in Treviso, in a friendly.

He has become a sports executive, after his player career. He was the President of OVA Rugby Pieve, his first team, and he is the vice-president of Union Rugbistica Bolognese, since 2009.
