= Massimo Bonomi =

Italy international rugby union player

Massimo Bonomi (born 22 June 1967, in Brescia) is a former Italian rugby union player and a sports manager. He played as a centre.

Bonomi played for Rugby Brescia (1985/86-1989/90), Amatori Rugby Milano (1990/91-1997/98), where he won 4 titles of the Italian Championship, in 1990/91, 1992/93, 1994/95 and 1995/96, and the Cup of Italy, in 1994/95, being a key player for the team, Amatori Calvisano (1998/99-2002/03), and Poncarale (2003/04-2006/07), where he would finish his career, aged 40 years old.

Bonomi had 34 caps for Italy, from 1988 to 1996, scoring 6 tries, 5 conversions, 13 penalties and 5 drop goals, 93 points in aggregate. He played at the 1991 Rugby World Cup, in two games, scoring a try in the 21–31 loss to New Zealand, and at the 1995 Rugby World Cup, in one game.
