= Constantin Cojocariu =

Romanian rugby union player (1965–2026)

- Born: 27 June 1965 Târgu Neamț, Romania
- Died: 7 March 2026 (aged 60)
- Height: 6 ft 7 in (201 cm)
- Weight: 252 lb (114 kg)

Rugby union career
- Position: Lock
International career
Years	Team	Apps	(Points)
1990–1996	Romania	40	(8)

Constantin Cojocariu (27 June 1965 – 7 March 2026) was a Romanian rugby union player who played as a lock.

== International career ==
Cojocariu gathered 40 caps for Romania, from his debut in 1990 to his last game in 1996. He scored two tries during his international career, eight points on aggregate. He was a member of his national side for the second and third Rugby World Cups in 1991 and 1995 and played in six group matches without scoring. He was also part of his national team for the historic win against France in Auch on 24 May 1990.

== Death ==
Cojocariu died on 7 March 2026, at the age of 60.
