= Francesco Pietrosanti =

Italian rugby union player

Francesco Pietrosanti (born 3 December 1963 in L'Aquila) is a former Italian rugby union player and a current sports director. He played as a scrum-half.

Pietrosanti played his entire career at L'Aquila Rugby, at the National Championship of Excellence, from 1982/83 to 1998/99. He won the National Championship title in 1993/94.

He had 25 caps for Italy, from 1987 to 1993, scoring 5 tries, 20 points on aggregate. He was called for the 1991 Rugby World Cup, without playing.

He has been team manager and sports director, since his retirement.
