= Fernando de la Calle =

Spanish rugby union player

- Born: 8 June 1970 (age 56) Valladolid, Spain
- Height: 5 ft 9 in (1.75 m)
- Weight: 214 lb (97 kg)

Rugby union career
- Position(s): Hooker, Scrum-half
Senior career
Years	Team	Apps	(Points)
19??-2013	Valladolid RAC		
International career
Years	Team	Apps	(Points)
1992-2002	Spain	34	(20)

Fernando de la Calle Pozo (born 8 August 1970 in Valladolid) is a Spanish rugby union player. He plays as a scrum-half and as hooker.

== Career ==
His first international cap was during a match against Argentina, at Madrid, on October 24, 1992. He was part of the 1999 Rugby World Cup roster, playing all the three matches. His last international cap was during a match against Italy, at his hometown, on September 22, 2002. He retired as player in 2013.
