= Giancarlo Pivetta =

Italian rugby union player

Giancarlo Pivetta (born 18 June 1957 in Musile di Piave) is a former Italian rugby union player and a current coach. He played as a prop and as a hooker.

== Club career ==
He played for Rugby San Donà, from 1976/77 to 1995/96. He joined Benetton Treviso for the season of 1996/97, and finished his career at Mirano Rugby 1957, where he played from 1997/98 to 1998/99. He left competition aged 42 years old.

== International career ==
He had 53 caps for Italy, from 1979 to 1993, scoring 5 tries, 20 points on aggregate. He had his first cap at the surprising loss of 0-44 to Romania, at 22 April 1979, in Bucharest, for the 1978–79 FIRA Trophy, in a game where he played as a replacement. He was called for the 1987 Rugby World Cup, but he never played. He was called once again for the 1991 Rugby World Cup, playing in three games, one as the captain, but without scoring. He had his last cap at the 38-6 win over Spain, at 21 June 1993, in Perpignan, for the Mediterranean Cup, aged 36 years old.

== Coach career ==
He became a coach at Mirano Rugby 1957, after finishing his player career, in 1999/2000 and would be in charge until 2001/02. He was the coach of Rugby San Donà, from 2002/03 to 2006/07, once again of Mirano Rugby 1957, from 2007/08 to 2008/09, and of Jesolo Rugby, from 2009/10 to 2011/12. He achieved the promotion of Jesolo Rugby from the Series C to the Series B in 2010/11, resigning the following season.
