= Daniel Neaga =

- Born: Daniel Neaga; 5 November 1965 (age 61) Botoroaga, Romania
- Height: 5 ft 8 in (173 cm)
- Weight: 176 lb (80 kg)

Rugby union career
- Position: Scrum-half
International career
Years	Team	Apps	(Points)
1988–1996	Romania	41	(19)
Coaching career
- Years: Team
- Dinamo București
- –: Olimpia București

Daniel Neaga (born 5 November 1965 in Botoroaga) is a former Romanian rugby union football player and currently a coach. He played as a scrum-half.

== Coaching career ==
After retiring from playing Daniel Neaga coached Romanian rugby clubs Dinamo București and Olimpia București. In the present time, Daniel Neaga is coaching in a town near Bucharest, at the A.C.S.O.V Pantelimon.

== International career ==
Daniel Neaga gathered 41 caps for Romania, from his debut in 1988 to his last game in 1996. He scored 4 tries during his international career, 19 points on aggregate. He was a member of his national side for the 2nd and 3rd Rugby World Cups in 1991 and 1995 and played in 4 group matches.
