= Ivan Francescato =

Italy international rugby union player

Ivan Francescato (10 February 1967 – 19 January 1999) was an Italian rugby union player.

Francescato began his career in his native city, Treviso, like his five elder siblings before him, all of whom played the game at high levels; three (besides him) made the Italian National team, Bruno, Nello and Rino. He got his technical and athletic training in the youth development teams at A.S. Ruggers Tarvisium 69.

He made his debut in the Italian Championship on 14 September 1986, as a centre, against A.S.R. Milano in Milan. He remained faithful to Benetton Treviso throughout his life. Francescato also played as a scrum half.

Francescato made his International debut on 7 October 1990 against Romania. His last appearance for the Azzurri was on 8 November 1997 against South Africa. Perhaps his most famous moment in an Italian shirt was scoring one of the tries of the tournament in the 1991 World Cup in the game against the USA, in which he stepped and feinted past several American defenders before touching down between the posts.

Ivan Francescato died suddenly of a heart attack at 3 a.m. at his home in Treviso. The Benetton Treviso rugby board decided to retire the number 13 shirt for the season.

== Italian team statistics ==
- 38 appearances
- 77 points scored
- 16 tries
- 2 Rugby World Cups Contested: 1991, 1995.
- Italian National Championships: 4 (1989, 1992, 1997, 1998 with Benetton Treviso)
