= Giovanni Grespan =

Italian rugby union player

Giovanni Grespan (born 21 January 1967 in Treviso) is an Italian former rugby union player and a current team manager. He played as a prop.

Grespan did all his playing career at Benetton Treviso, from 1985/86 to 2000/01, where he won six titles of the Italian Championship, in 1988/89, 1991/92, 1996/97, 1997/98, 1998/99, and 2000/01, and the Cup of Italy, in 1997/98.

Grespan had 20 caps for Italy, from 1989 to 1994, scoring 1 try, 5 points in aggregate. He was called for the 1991 Rugby World Cup, playing a single game and being scoreless, and for the 1995 Rugby World Cup, but this time he didn't play.

After finishing his playing career, he became involved in Benetton Rugby Treviso team management.
