= Tiberiu Brînză =

Romania international rugby union player

- Born: 21 September 1968 (age 58) Bucharest, SR Romania
- Height: 6 ft 6 in (1.98 m)
- Weight: 252 lb (114 kg)

Rugby union career
- Position: No. 8
Senior career
Years	Team	Apps	(Points)
- Locomotiva București
–	R.C. Grivița		
–	Universitatea Cluj-Napoca		
–	Narbonne		
–	FCS Rumilly		
International career
Years	Team	Apps	(Points)
1990-2002	Romania	37	(10)

Tiberiu Eugen Brînză (born 21 September 1968 in Bucharest) is a former Romanian rugby union player. He played as number eight.

He played for RC Narbonne and for Rumilly in France.

He had 37 caps for Romania, from 1990 to 2002, scoring 2 tries, 10 points on aggregate. He was called for the 1991 Rugby World Cup, playing a single game, for the 1995 Rugby World Cup, playing in two games as the captain, and for the 1999 Rugby World Cup, playing in three games. He never scored in any of his presences at the competition.
