= Stefano Bordon =

Italian rugby union footballer and coach

Stefano Bordon (born 2 February 1968, in Rovigo) is a former Italian rugby union player and a current coach. He played as a centre.

Bordon played for Rugby Rovigo from 1985/86 to 1994/95, where he won 2 titles of the Italian Championship, in 1987/88 and 1989/90. He then would play a season at Piacenza Rugby Club, in 1995/96, and another at RC Toulonnais, in France, in 1996/97. Bordon returned afterwards to Rugby Rovigo to play two more seasons, from 1997/98 to 1998/2000, finishing his career at CUS Verona, where he performed for three seasons, until 2002/03.

Bordon then would be a coach, first at CUS Verona (2003/04). Since 2010/11, he has coached Rugby Badia.

Bordon had 29 caps for Italy, from 1990 to 1997, scoring 1 try and 5 points on aggregate. His first match was on 7 October 1990, in the 29-21 win over Romania for the 1991 Rugby World Cup qualifyings, in Padua. He was called for the 1991 Rugby World Cup, where he never played, and for the 1995 Rugby World Cup, where he made two appearances, without scoring. His last match would be the 40-32 win over France on 22 March 1997, in Grenoble, that gave Italy the historical title of the FIRA Championship and their first-ever triumph in French.
