= Nicolae Răcean =

Romania international rugby union player

- Born: Nicolae Răcean; 29 November 1963 (age 62) Sărmaș, Romania
- Height: 5 ft 11 in (180 cm)
- Weight: 176 lb (80 kg)

Rugby union career
- Position: Centre
Senior career
Years	Team	Apps	(Points)
- Universitatea Cluj
–	Universitatea Timișoara		
International career
Years	Team	Apps	(Points)
1988–1995	Romania	39	(32)
Coaching career
- Years: Team
- –: Isa Prime Viterbo

Nicolae Răcean (born 29 November 1963 in Sărmaș) is a Romanian former rugby union player and current coach of Italian side ASD Tuscia.

He played as a centre.

== Club career ==
During his career Răcean played for Romanian clubs Universitatea Cluj and Universitatea Timișoara. He finished his playing career in Italy.

== International career ==
Răcean gathered 39 caps for Romania, from his debut in 1988 to his last game in 1995. He scored 5 tries, 3 penalties and 1 conversion during his international career, 32 points on aggregate. He was a member of his national side for the 2nd and 3rd Rugby World Cups in 1991 and 1995 and played in all 6 group matches and scored a penalty and a conversion against Flying Fijians in Pool 4 match held in Brive-la-Gaillarde, on 12 October 1991.
