= Gabriel Vlad =

Romania international rugby union player

- Born: Gabriel Vlad; 9 April 1969 (age 57) Bucharest, Romania
- Height: 6 ft 0 in (183 cm)
- Weight: 230 lb (104 kg)

Rugby union career
- Position: Prop
Senior career
| Years | Team | Apps | (Points) |
- Rugby Club Grivița
International career
| Years | Team | Apps | (Points) |
| 1991–1998 | Romania | 30 | (5) |

Gabriel Vlad (born 9 April 1969 in Bucharest) is a former Romanian former rugby union football player. He played as a prop.

== Club career ==
During his career Vlad played for Romanian club RC Grivița. He also played in France for RC Narbonne.

== International career ==
Vlad gathered 30 caps for Romania, from his debut in 1991 to his last game in 1998. He scored 1 try during his international career, 5 points on aggregate. He was a member of his national side for the 2nd and 3rd Rugby World Cups in 1991 and 1995 and played 5 group matches without scoring.

== Honours ==
Rugby Club Grivița

- Divizia Națională: 1992-93
