= Luigi Troiani =

Italy international rugby union player (born 1964)

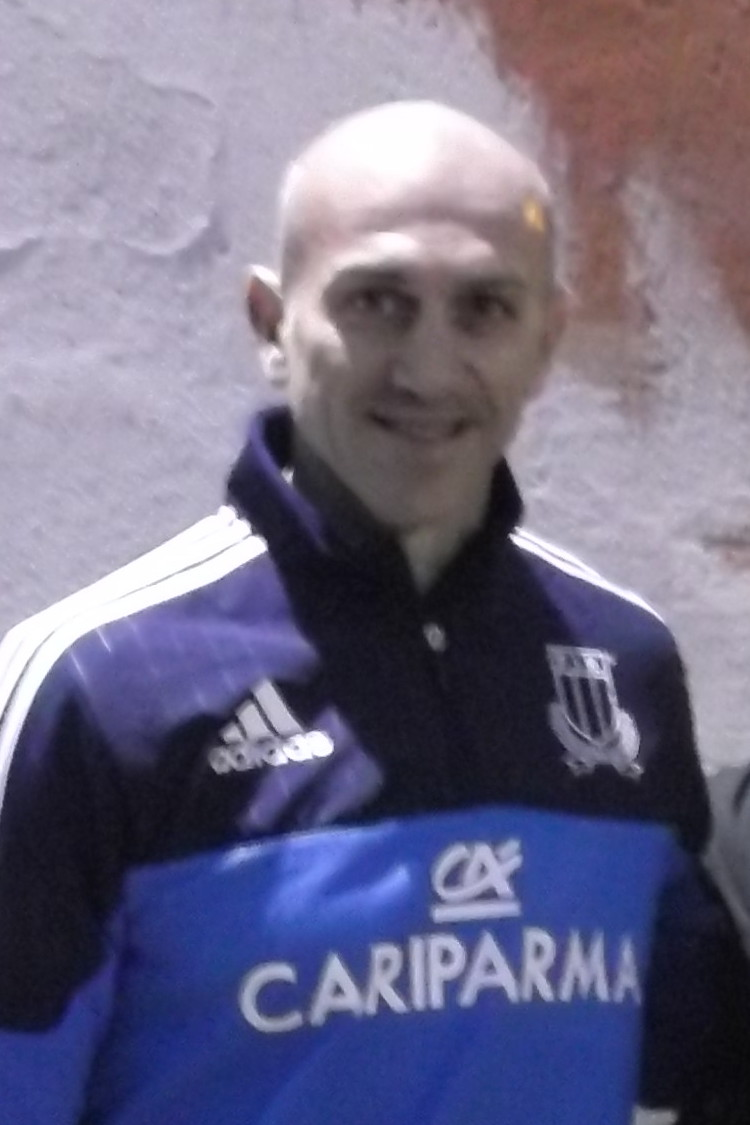
Former Italian international rugby union player Luigi "Gino" Troiani, now team manager of the National team.

Luigi Rosario Troiani (born 25 February 1964 in Afragola, Province of Naples) is an Italian rugby player. He usually played as a fullback and sometimes as a scrum-half.

He played all his career at L'Aquila Rugby, from 1981/82 to 1996/97, when he called it to an end. He won the title of Italian Champion in 1994/94.

He had 47 caps for the Italian national team, from 1985 to 1995, scoring 2 tries, 57 conversions and 57 penalties, in an aggregate of 294 points. Troiani played at the 1991 Rugby World Cup, in two matches, and the 1995 Rugby World Cup, once again in two matches.
