= Gheorghe Ion =

- Born: 27 July 1960 (age 66)

Rugby union career
- Position: Hooker
International career
Years	Team	Apps	(Points)
1984–94	Romania	38	(12)

Gheorghe Ion (born 27 July 1960) is a Romanian former rugby union international active in the 1980s and 1990s. He is the father of rugby player Adrian Ion.

Ion, a hooker, was known by the nickname "Tarzan". He started playing rugby union at Bucharest School Sports Club and had a long association with CS Dinamo București. Internationally, Ion featured in 38 Test matches, which included a stint as captain. He scored Romania's only try in a famous win over Wales at Cardiff Arms Park in 1988. In 1991 he represented Romania at the Rugby World Cup, playing all three matches.

== See also ==
- List of Romania national rugby union players
