= Gheorghe Solomie =

Romanian rugby union player

- Born: Gheorghe Lucian Solomie; 5 March 1969 (age 57) Beiuș, Romania
- Height: 6 ft 1 in (185 cm)
- Weight: 206 lb (93 kg)

Rugby union career
- Position: Wing
Senior career
Years	Team	Apps	(Points)
- UVT Timișoara
–	Grenoble		
–	Aurillac		
International career
Years	Team	Apps	(Points)
1992–2001	Romania	50	(65)

Gheorghe Lucian Solomie (born 5 March 1969 in Beiuș) is a former Romanian rugby union player. He played as a wing. In 1995 he was the first rugby union player of UVT Timișoara to be called for a World Cup.

== Club career ==
He mostly played for UVT Timișoara and also in France for Grenoble and Aurillac.

== International career ==
Solomie had 50 caps for Romania, from 1992 to 2001. He scored 13 tries during his international career, 65 points on aggregate. He was a member of his national side for the 1995 Rugby World Cup and 1999 Rugby World Cup.
