= Sandu Ciorăscu =

Romania international rugby union player

- Born: Sandu Ciorăscu; 11 September 1966 (age 60) Bârlad, Romania
- Height: 6 ft 5 in (196 cm)
- Weight: 270 lb (122 kg)

Rugby union career
- Position: Lock
Senior career
Years	Team	Apps	(Points)
- Baia Mare
–	Auch		
International career
Years	Team	Apps	(Points)
1988–1999	Romania	41	(8)

Sandu Ciorăscu (born 11 September 1966) in Bârlad, is a former Romanian rugby union football player. He played as a lock.

== Club career ==
Sandu played for Baia Mare and also for Auch during his career and also captained the French side.

== International career ==
Ciorăscu gathered 41 caps for Romania, from his debut in 1988 to his last game in 1999. He scored 2 tries during his international career, 8 points on aggregate. He was a member of his national side for the 2nd and 3rd Rugby World Cups in 1991 and 1995 and played in each of the 3 group matches.
