= Julio Álvarez (rugby union) =

Spanish former rugby union player

- Born: José Julio Álvarez de Temiño; 3 November 1961 (age 65) Valladolid, Spain
- Height: 1.84 m (6 ft 0 in)
- Weight: 105 kg (231 lb)

Rugby union career
- Position: Prop
Senior career
Years	Team	Apps	(Points)
1982–1995	CR El Salvador		
International career
Years	Team	Apps	(Points)
1982–1995	Spain	75	(5)

José Julio Álvarez de Temiño (born in Valladolid, on 3 November 1961), known also by his nickname Pirulo, is a Spanish former rugby union player and currently coach. He played as a prop.

== Career ==
He started to play rugby union for the Colegio de Lourdes team at junior and youth levels. He then played for Colegio San José until the rugby section of the college was suppressed. He later joined CR El Salvador, where he would mostly play for the rest of his career, winning two División de Honor titles in 1991 and 1997. At international level, he debuted for Spain on 8 May 1983 against Sweden, in Arstad. He captained Spain in three seasons and also won a bronze medal at the 1993 Mediterranean Games. His last international cap was during a test against a Scotland XV on 6 May 1995, in Madrid. He also earned 10 junior international caps, 5 under-23 caps and 75 senior international caps, being the third player with most international caps for Spain.

== After career ==
In 2010, he was appointed as scrum coach for his former club, CR El Salvador, being also part of the club's directors board. In 2021, he took part in the Spanish rugby union documentary Quince.
