= Amatori Rugby Milano =

Defunct Italian rugby union club, based in Milan

(Italy) Amatori Milano
- Full name: Amatori Rugby Milano
- Union: FIR
- Founded: 1927
- Disbanded: 2011; 15 years ago
- Location: Milan, Italy
- Ground: Arena Civica (Capacity: 10,000)
- Top scorer: Diego Domínguez (2,966)
1st kit	2nd kit

Amatori Rugby Milano were an Italian rugby union team based in Milan founded in 1927 and disbanded in 2011.

Founded in 1927 as part of the football team Ambrosiana-Inter of Milan, the club won the first ever Italian championship in 1929 and ever since have won 18 domestic championships that made them Italy's most titled rugby union team. The club members named themselves Amatori Rugby Milano as soon as Ambrosiana-Inter dropped their rugby union branch in 1929.

Between 1993 and 1997 Amatori Milano was part of the A.C. Milan sport club under the ownership of Silvio Berlusconi and won 4 domestic championships. When Berlusconi dropped the sport club to keep the football team only Amatori folded and in 1998 the senior team and the sports title were sold to Calvisano. The club were revived in 2002 and coached by Marcello Cuttitta, a former Italian international rugby union player that played for Amatori in the 1990s, managing to reach the second tier of Italian rugby union championship. His twin brother, Massimo Cuttitta, who also captained the team, died of complications from Covid-19 in 2021.

The club was disbanded in 2011.

== History ==
Amatori Rugby Milano was founded in 1928 as Ambrosiana, branch of the "Ambrosiana Football Club", that today is known as Internazionale Milano F.C. The club won the first ever Italian domestic championship (today, the Top12) in 1929. Amatori Rugby Milano would dominate the coming years, winning back-to-back titles in 1931, 1932 and 1933. Amatori Rugby Milano won the championship again in 1936, and then twice more during the decade, in total throughout the 1930s, winning the national championship on eight occasions. The 1940s were also a highly successful time for the club; winning the championship after their 1939 victory once again in 1940, which was then following by successful championships three seasons in a row to 1943. Amatori Rugby Milano won a fifth title that decade, winning the 1946 season as well.

The following years were very quiet in contrast to the dominance of the 1930s and 1940s. The club however won a number of titles during the 1990s as well: capturing the 1991, 1993 national championships and 1995, 1996 as part of the A.C. Milan sport club, under the ownership of Silvio Berlusconi, as well as winning the Coppa Italia for the first time in the club's history in the 1995 season.

When Berlusconi dropped the sport club to keep the football team only Amatori folded and in 1998 the senior team and the sports title were sold to Calvisano. The club were revived in 2002 and during the early 2000s Amatori Milano were in Serie C, but quickly found qualification to Serie B. In 2010 Amatori Milano is promoted to Serie A, the second tier of Italian rugby union championship, where they competed in two seasons before being disbanded in 2011.

== Honours ==
- Italian championship
  - Champions (18): 1929, 1930, 1931, 1932, 1933, 1934, 1936, 1938, 1939, 1940, 1941, 1942, 1943, 1946, 1991, 1993, 1995, 1996
  - Runners-up (2): 1994, 1997
- Coppa Italia
  - Champions (1): 1995

== Statistics ==
=== Heineken Cup ===
Season	Played	Won	Drawn	Lost	For	Against
1995–96	2	0	0	2	33	55
1996–97	4	0	0	4	73	141
1997–98	6	1	0	5	111	206

== See also ==
- List of rugby union clubs in Italy
- Rugby union in Italy
