= Francisco Puertas =

Spain international rugby union player

- Born: Francisco José Puertas Soto; 18 November 1963 (age 62) Lazkao, Spain
- Height: 6 ft 1 in (1.85 m)
- Weight: 14 st 4 lb (91 kg)

Rugby union career
- Position(s): Fullback, Fly-half
Senior career
Years	Team	Apps	(Points)
1981-1984	Ordizia RE		
1984-1991	Real Canoe N.C.		
1991-1996	Aviron Bayonnais		
1996-2004	Saint-Jean-de-Luz		
2004-2006	Ordizia RE		
International career
Years	Team	Apps	(Points)
1984-1999	Spain	93	(78)
Coaching career
- Years: Team
- 2023-25: Zarautz RT
- 2025-: Gaztedi RT

Francisco Puertas Soto (born 18 September 1963) is a Spanish rugby union footballer. He played at fullback or flyhalf.

He was capped 93 times by Spain, from 1994 to 2001. Soto played for his country at the 1999 Rugby World Cup finals.

He was the most capped Spanish international rugby union player, ending his career after the 1999 Rugby World Cup. He coached Spain national rugby sevens team, Ordizia, Zarautz and Atlético San Sebastian.
