= List of Romania national rugby union players =

List of Romania national rugby union players is a list of people who have played for the Romania national rugby union team. The list only includes players who have played in a match recognized by the Romanian Rugby Federation as a test match, whether it was played before or after the governing body was founded in 1931. (In rugby union, any match of a nation's senior side recognized as a test by its national governing body is included in test statistics for that nation.) Players that were first capped during the same match are listed in order of those that began in the starting line up before replacements and then in alphabetical order by surname. Note that the "position" column lists the position at which the player made his test debut and not necessarily the position for which he is best known. A position in parentheses indicates that the player debuted as a substitute.

Members of the national rugby union team who have been inducted into the World Rugby Hall of Fame include the players from the bronze medal-winning team from the 1924 Olympic Games (inducted in 2012).

== List ==
No.	Name	Position	Date of debut	Opposition	Competition	Venue	Ref.
1	Gheorghe Benția	Not recorded	1919	United States	1919 Inter-Allied Games	Stade Olympique Yves-du-Manoir; Colombes	
2	Victor Brabetianu	Not recorded	1919	United States	1919 Inter-Allied Games	Stade Olympique Yves-du-Manoir; Colombes	
3	Grigore Caracostea	Not recorded	1919	United States	1919 Inter-Allied Games	Stade Olympique Yves-du-Manoir; Colombes	
4	Constantin Cratunescu	Not recorded	1919	United States	1919 Inter-Allied Games	Stade Olympique Yves-du-Manoir; Colombes	
5	Aurel Draghici	Not recorded	1919	United States	1919 Inter-Allied Games	Stade Olympique Yves-du-Manoir; Colombes	
6	Ioan Hussar	Not recorded	1919	United States	1919 Inter-Allied Games	Stade Olympique Yves-du-Manoir; Colombes	
7	Ioan Iconomu	Not recorded	1919	United States	1919 Inter-Allied Games	Stade Olympique Yves-du-Manoir; Colombes	
8	Mircea Iconomu	Not recorded	1919	United States	1919 Inter-Allied Games	Stade Olympique Yves-du-Manoir; Colombes	
9	Henry Manu	Lock	1919	United States	1919 Inter-Allied Games	Stade Olympique Yves-du-Manoir; Colombes	
10	Radu Polizu	Not recorded	1919	United States	1919 Inter-Allied Games	Stade Olympique Yves-du-Manoir; Colombes	
11	Rudy Schmettau	Not recorded	1919	United States	1919 Inter-Allied Games	Stade Olympique Yves-du-Manoir; Colombes	
12	G. Simion	Not recorded	1919	United States	1919 Inter-Allied Games	Stade Olympique Yves-du-Manoir; Colombes	
13	Mircea Vidrașcu	Not recorded	1919	United States	1919 Inter-Allied Games	Stade Olympique Yves-du-Manoir; Colombes	
14	Paul Vidrașcu	Not recorded	1919	United States	1919 Inter-Allied Games	Stade Olympique Yves-du-Manoir; Colombes	
15	Gheorghe Vraca	Not recorded	1919	United States	1919 Inter-Allied Games	Stade Olympique Yves-du-Manoir; Colombes	
16	Gheorghe Dragomirescu	Not recorded	1919	France XV	1919 Inter-Allied Games	Stade Charlety; Paris	
17	Nicolae Mărăscu	Not recorded	1919	France XV	1919 Inter-Allied Games	Stade Charlety; Paris	
18	Sorin Mihăilescu	Not recorded	1919	France XV	1919 Inter-Allied Games	Stade Charlety; Paris	
19	Atanase Tanasescu	Not recorded	1919	France XV	1919 Inter-Allied Games	Stade Charlety; Paris	
20	Gheorghe Ticleanu	Not recorded	1919	France XV	1919 Inter-Allied Games	Stade Charlety; Paris	
21	Dumitru Armășel	Prop	May 4, 1924	France	1924 Summer Olympics	Stade Olympique Yves-du-Manoir; Colombes	
22	Teodor Florian	Fullback	May 4, 1924	France	1924 Summer Olympics	Stade Olympique Yves-du-Manoir; Colombes	
23	Ion Gîrleșteanu	Scrum-half	May 4, 1924	France	1924 Summer Olympics	Stade Olympique Yves-du-Manoir; Colombes	
24	Teodor Marian	Lock	May 4, 1924	France	1924 Summer Olympics	Stade Olympique Yves-du-Manoir; Colombes	
25	Paul Nedelcovici	Lock	May 4, 1924	France	1924 Summer Olympics	Stade Olympique Yves-du-Manoir; Colombes	
26	Iosif Nemes	Flanker	May 4, 1924	France	1924 Summer Olympics	Stade Olympique Yves-du-Manoir; Colombes	
27	Eugen Sfetescu	Hooker	May 4, 1924	France	1924 Summer Olympics	Stade Olympique Yves-du-Manoir; Colombes	
28	Mircea Sfetescu	Center	May 4, 1924	France	1924 Summer Olympics	Stade Olympique Yves-du-Manoir; Colombes	
29	Soare Sterian	No. 8	May 4, 1924	France	1924 Summer Olympics	Stade Olympique Yves-du-Manoir; Colombes	
30	Mihai Vardală	Flanker	May 4, 1924	France	1924 Summer Olympics	Stade Olympique Yves-du-Manoir; Colombes	
31	Dumitru Volvoreanu	No. 8	May 11, 1924	United States	1924 Summer Olympics	Stade Olympique Yves-du-Manoir; Colombes	
32	Andrei Bals	Not recorded	May 15, 1927	France XV	Test match	Stade Charlety; Paris	
33	Rudolf Ekert	Not recorded	May 15, 1927	France XV	Test match	Stade Charlety; Paris	
34	Paul Florian	Not recorded	May 15, 1927	France XV	Test match	Stade Charlety; Paris	
35	I. Jipescu	Not recorded	May 15, 1927	France XV	Test match	Stade Charlety; Paris	
36	Aurel Marasescu	Not recorded	May 15, 1927	France XV	Test match	Stade Charlety; Paris	
37	Gheorghe Nicola	Not recorded	May 15, 1927	France XV	Test match	Stade Charlety; Paris	
38	Peuciulescu	Not recorded	May 15, 1927	France XV	Test match	Stade Charlety; Paris	
39	G. Sfetescu	Not recorded	May 15, 1927	France XV	Test match	Stade Charlety; Paris	
40	Nicolae Sfetescu	Not recorded	May 15, 1927	France XV	Test match	Stade Charlety; Paris	
41	N. Vardala	Not recorded	May 15, 1927	France XV	Test match	Stade Charlety; Paris	
42	Dumitru Bratulescu	Not recorded	May 19, 1927	Germany	Test match	Fritz Grunebaum Stadium; Heidelberg	
43	Tudor Ioan	Not recorded	May 19, 1927	Germany	Test match	Fritz Grunebaum Stadium; Heidelberg	
44	Plumiee	Not recorded	May 19, 1927	Germany	Test match	Fritz Grunebaum Stadium; Heidelberg	
45	N. Soculescu	Not recorded	May 19, 1927	Germany	Test match	Fritz Grunebaum Stadium; Heidelberg	
46	Nicolae Anastasiade	Not recorded	May 22, 1927	Czechoslovakia	Test match	Bratislava	
47	Mircea Socolescu	Not recorded	May 22, 1927	Czechoslovakia	Test match	Bratislava	
48	Eugen Stoian	Not recorded	May 22, 1927	Czechoslovakia	Test match	Bratislava	
49	Chirita Alexandrescu	Scrum-half	Dec 26, 1934	Italy	Test match	Arena Civica; Milan	
50	Stefan Barsan	Prop	Dec 26, 1934	Italy	Test match	Arena Civica; Milan	
51	Ascanio Damian	Center	Dec 26, 1934	Italy	Test match	Arena Civica; Milan	
52	Constantin Dinescu	Wing	Dec 26, 1934	Italy	Test match	Arena Civica; Milan	
53	Gheorghe Fantaneanu	Hooker	Dec 26, 1934	Italy	Test match	Arena Civica; Milan	
54	Gică Ionescu	Flanker	Dec 26, 1934	Italy	Test match	Arena Civica; Milan	
55	Vasile Lapusneanu	Wing	Dec 26, 1934	Italy	Test match	Arena Civica; Milan	
56	Andrei Mateescu	Lock	Dec 26, 1934	Italy	Test match	Arena Civica; Milan	
57	Constantin Moscu	No. 8	Dec 26, 1934	Italy	Test match	Arena Civica; Milan	
58	Ioan Popa	Center	Dec 26, 1934	Italy	Test match	Arena Civica; Milan	
59	Colibași Popescu	Fullback	Dec 26, 1934	Italy	Test match	Arena Civica; Milan	
60	E. Sfetescu	Flanker	Dec 26, 1934	Italy	Test match	Arena Civica; Milan	
61	Ilie Tarabega	Prop	Dec 26, 1934	Italy	Test match	Arena Civica; Milan	
62	George Wirth	Fly-half	Dec 26, 1934	Italy	Test match	Arena Civica; Milan	
63	Virgil Anastasiade	(Substitute)	Dec 26, 1934	Italy	Test match	Arena Civica; Milan	
64	Constantin Beju	Flanker	May 15, 1936	France XV	1936 FIRA Tournament	Berlin	
65	Simion Burlescu	Lock	May 15, 1936	France XV	1936 FIRA Tournament	Berlin	
66	Nic Crissoveloni	Fly-half	May 15, 1936	France XV	1936 FIRA Tournament	Berlin	
67	C. Grigorescu	Center	May 15, 1936	France XV	1936 FIRA Tournament	Berlin	
68	Ion Irimia	No. 8	May 15, 1936	France XV	1936 FIRA Tournament	Berlin	
69	Eugen Marculescu	Scrum-half	May 15, 1936	France XV	1936 FIRA Tournament	Berlin	
70	Marin Slobozeanu	Prop	May 15, 1936	France XV	1936 FIRA Tournament	Berlin	
71	Gheorghe Ionescu	Flanker	May 17, 1936	Italy	1936 FIRA Tournament	Berlin	
72	Ștefan Ionescu	Prop	May 17, 1936	Italy	1936 FIRA Tournament	Berlin	
73	Francisc Covaci	Not recorded	May 20, 1936	Germany	Test match	Berlin	
74	Ion Andriesi	Center	Apr 25, 1937	Italy	Test match	Dinamo Stadium; Bucharest	
75	Gheorghe Blasek	Lock	Apr 25, 1937	Italy	Test match	Dinamo Stadium; Bucharest	
76	Costica Florea	Center	Apr 25, 1937	Italy	Test match	Dinamo Stadium; Bucharest	
77	Nicolae Tanoviceanu	Flanker	Apr 25, 1937	Italy	Test match	Dinamo Stadium; Bucharest	
78	Gheorghe Dumitriu	Not recorded	Oct 10, 1937	Netherlands	1937 FIRA Tournament	Stade Charlety; Paris	
79	Serban Ghica	Not recorded	Oct 10, 1937	Netherlands	1937 FIRA Tournament	Stade Charlety; Paris	
80	Virgil Ioan	Not recorded	Oct 10, 1937	Netherlands	1937 FIRA Tournament	Stade Charlety; Paris	
81	Constantin Turut	Not recorded	Oct 10, 1937	Netherlands	1937 FIRA Tournament	Stade Charlety; Paris	
82	Tr. Ifrim	Not recorded	Oct 14, 1937	France XV	1937 FIRA Tournament	Parc des Princes; Paris	
83	Toma Moldoveanu	Not recorded	Oct 14, 1937	France XV	1937 FIRA Tournament	Parc des Princes; Paris	
84	Eduard Pana	(Substitute)	Oct 14, 1937	France XV	1937 FIRA Tournament	Parc des Princes; Paris	
85	Gheorghe Crivat	Lock	May 15, 1938	France	1938 FIRA Tournament	Dinamo Stadium; Bucharest	
86	Vasile Niculescu	No. 8	May 15, 1938	France	1938 FIRA Tournament	Dinamo Stadium; Bucharest	
87	Constantin Tanase	Hooker	May 15, 1938	France	1938 FIRA Tournament	Dinamo Stadium; Bucharest	
88	Constantin Diamandi-Telu	Not recorded	May 19, 1938	Germany	1938 FIRA Tournament	Dinamo Stadium; Bucharest	
89	Ion Camenita	Lock	Apr 29, 1939	Italy	Test match	Rome	
90	C. Kurtzbauer	Prop	Apr 29, 1939	Italy	Test match	Rome	
91	C. Sadoveanu	Center	Apr 29, 1939	Italy	Test match	Rome	
92	Tricorescu	Wing	Apr 29, 1939	Italy	Test match	Rome	
93	P. Calistrat	Wing	Apr 14, 1940	Italy	Test match	Dinamo Stadium; Bucharest	
94	Theodor Krantz	Lock	Apr 14, 1940	Italy	Test match	Dinamo Stadium; Bucharest	
95	Nicolae Nicolau	Center	Apr 14, 1940	Italy	Test match	Dinamo Stadium; Bucharest	
96	Gheorghe Pircalabescu	Hooker	Apr 14, 1940	Italy	Test match	Dinamo Stadium; Bucharest	
97	Constantin Cocor	(Lock)	Apr 14, 1940	Italy	Test match	Dinamo Stadium; Bucharest	
98	Cornel Munteanu	(Fly-half)	Apr 14, 1940	Italy	Test match	Dinamo Stadium; Bucharest	
99	Nicolae Diaconu	Flanker	May 2, 1942	Italy	Test match	Arena Civica; Milan	
100	I. Glavan	Hooker	May 2, 1942	Italy	Test match	Arena Civica; Milan	
101	Picu Traiau	(Flanker)	May 2, 1942	Italy	Test match	Arena Civica; Milan	
102	Marin Ciobanu	Not recorded	Not known (Note: Although a specific date is not recorded for this match, ESPN lists this match chronologically between two matches played on May 2, 1942 and October 21, 1951.)	Czechoslovakia	Test match	Bratislava	
103	Eduard Denischi	Not recorded	Not known	Czechoslovakia	Test match	Bratislava	
104	Nicolae Ghiondea	Not recorded	Not known	Czechoslovakia	Test match	Bratislava	
105	Dumitru Ionescu	Not recorded	Not known	Czechoslovakia	Test match	Bratislava	
106	George Ionescu	Not recorded	Not known	Czechoslovakia	Test match	Bratislava	
107	P. Iordanescu	Not recorded	Not known	Czechoslovakia	Test match	Bratislava	
108	D. Manoileanu	Not recorded	Not known	Czechoslovakia	Test match	Bratislava	
109	Anastasia Marinache	Not recorded	Not known	Czechoslovakia	Test match	Bratislava	
110	Nicolae Soculescu	Not recorded	Not known	Czechoslovakia	Test match	Bratislava	
111	Radu Veluda	Not recorded	Not known	Czechoslovakia	Test match	Bratislava	
112	Alexandru Visan	Not recorded	Not known	Czechoslovakia	Test match	Bratislava	
113	Dumitru Zamfir	Not recorded	Not known	Czechoslovakia	Test match	Bratislava	
114	Emanuel Valeriu	(Substitute)	Not known	Czechoslovakia	Test match	Bratislava	
115	Alex Caligari	Not recorded	Oct 21, 1951	East Germany	Test match	Dinamo Stadium; Bucharest	
116	Ion Dobre	Not recorded	Oct 21, 1951	East Germany	Test match	Dinamo Stadium; Bucharest	
117	Vladimir Ghiata	Not recorded	Oct 21, 1951	East Germany	Test match	Dinamo Stadium; Bucharest	
118	Dumitru Ghiuzelea	Not recorded	Oct 21, 1951	East Germany	Test match	Dinamo Stadium; Bucharest	
119	S. Luric	Not recorded	Oct 21, 1951	East Germany	Test match	Dinamo Stadium; Bucharest	
120	S. Mehedinti	Not recorded	Oct 21, 1951	East Germany	Test match	Dinamo Stadium; Bucharest	
121	Constantin Stefan	Not recorded	Oct 21, 1951	East Germany	Test match	Dinamo Stadium; Bucharest	
122	Dragos Tenescu	Not recorded	Oct 21, 1951	East Germany	Test match	Dinamo Stadium; Bucharest	
123	Nicolae Soculescu	Not recorded	Oct 21, 1951	East Germany	Test match	Dinamo Stadium; Bucharest	
124	Mărgărit Blăgescu	Not recorded	May 11, 1952	East Germany	Test match	Berlin	
125	Rene Chiriac	Not recorded	May 11, 1952	East Germany	Test match	Berlin	
126	C. Cristoloveanu	Not recorded	May 11, 1952	East Germany	Test match	Berlin	
127	Ion Ilie	Not recorded	May 11, 1952	East Germany	Test match	Berlin	
128	Viorel Morariu	Not recorded	May 11, 1952	East Germany	Test match	Berlin	
129	Radu Nanu	Not recorded	May 11, 1952	East Germany	Test match	Berlin	
130	Alexandru Paloseanu	Not recorded	May 11, 1952	East Germany	Test match	Berlin	
131	I. Ciobanu	(Substitute)	May 11, 1952	East Germany	Test match	Berlin	
132	N. Popa	(Substitute)	May 14, 1952	East Germany	Test match	Henningsdorf	
133	Petre Buda	Fullback	May 24, 1953	Italy	Test match	Dinamo Stadium; Bucharest	
134	Emile Dumitrescu	No. 8	May 24, 1953	Italy	Test match	Dinamo Stadium; Bucharest	
135	Mircea Socolescu	Hooker	May 24, 1953	Italy	Test match	Dinamo Stadium; Bucharest	
136	Carol Kramer	Not recorded	Apr 20, 1955	Czechoslovakia	Test match	Brno	
137	Alexandru Penciu	Not recorded	Apr 20, 1955	Czechoslovakia	Test match	Brno	
138	Vasile Mladin	(Lock)	Apr 20, 1955	Czechoslovakia	Test match	Brno	
139	C. Barascu	Wing	May 19, 1957	France	Test match	Dinamo Stadium; Bucharest	
140	Lica Coter	Prop	May 19, 1957	France	Test match	Dinamo Stadium; Bucharest	
141	I. Florescu	No. 8	May 19, 1957	France	Test match	Dinamo Stadium; Bucharest	
142	Paul Iordachescu	Hooker	May 19, 1957	France	Test match	Dinamo Stadium; Bucharest	
143	Alexandru Teofilovici	Prop	May 19, 1957	France	Test match	Dinamo Stadium; Bucharest	
144	Ion Dorutiu	Not recorded	Aug 4, 1957	Czechoslovakia	Test match	Sparta Stadium; Moscow	
145	Constantin Stanescu	Not recorded	Dec 12, 1957	Belgium	Test match	King Baudouin Stadium; Brussels	
146	M. Tibuleac	Not recorded	Dec 12, 1957	Belgium	Test match	King Baudouin Stadium; Brussels	
147	Victor Luscal	Not recorded	May 1, 1958	Spain	Universal Exposition	Liège	
148	Gheorghe Mazilu	Not recorded	May 1, 1958	Spain	Universal Exposition	Liège	
149	Teodor Radulescu	Not recorded	May 1, 1958	Spain	Universal Exposition	Liège	
150	I. Teodorescu	Not recorded	May 1, 1958	Spain	Universal Exposition	Liège	
151	D. Zlatoianu	Not recorded	May 1, 1958	Spain	Universal Exposition	Liège	
152	Aurel Barbu	Not recorded	May 4, 1958	West Germany	Universal Exposition	King Baudouin Stadium; Brussels	
153	S. Caliman	Not recorded	Oct 12, 1958	East Germany	Test match	Brandenburg	
154	Niculae Cordos	Not recorded	Oct 12, 1958	East Germany	Test match	Brandenburg	
155	Tiberiu Hell	Not recorded	Oct 12, 1958	East Germany	Test match	Brandenburg	
156	Alexandru Ionescu	Not recorded	Oct 12, 1958	East Germany	Test match	Brandenburg	
157	Gheorghe Melinte	Not recorded	Oct 12, 1958	East Germany	Test match	Brandenburg	
158	Mircea Nagel	Not recorded	Oct 12, 1958	East Germany	Test match	Brandenburg	
159	I. Popescu	Not recorded	Oct 12, 1958	East Germany	Test match	Brandenburg	
160	Alexandru Stanciu	Not recorded	Oct 12, 1958	East Germany	Test match	Brandenburg	
161	Gheorghe Stanciu	Not recorded	Oct 12, 1958	East Germany	Test match	Brandenburg	
162	N. Varta	Not recorded	Oct 12, 1958	East Germany	Test match	Brandenburg	
163	Gheorghe Graur	No. 8	Dec 7, 1958	Italy	Test match	Stadio Santa Maria Goretti; Catania	
164	Petre Niculescu	Flanker	Dec 7, 1958	Italy	Test match	Stadio Santa Maria Goretti; Catania	
165	V. Sebe	Prop	Dec 7, 1958	Italy	Test match	Stadio Santa Maria Goretti; Catania	
166	Radu Demian	Not recorded	May 19, 1959	East Germany	Victory Cup	Dinamo Stadium; Bucharest	
167	Adrian Mateescu	Not recorded	May 19, 1959	East Germany	Victory Cup	Dinamo Stadium; Bucharest	
168	Vasile Nistor	Not recorded	May 19, 1959	East Germany	Victory Cup	Dinamo Stadium; Bucharest	
169	Ion Sava	Not recorded	May 19, 1959	East Germany	Victory Cup	Dinamo Stadium; Bucharest	
170	M. Wusek	Not recorded	May 19, 1959	East Germany	Victory Cup	Dinamo Stadium; Bucharest	
171	Gheorghe Manole	Not recorded	May 21, 1959	Poland	Victory Cup	Dinamo Stadium; Bucharest	
172	Dumitru Gherasim	Not recorded	May 24, 1959	Czechoslovakia	Victory Cup	Dinamo Stadium; Bucharest	
173	Mircea Rusu	Not recorded	Sep 27, 1959	East Germany	Victory Cup	Dinamo Stadium; Bucharest	
174	Gheorghe Drobota	Not recorded	May 22, 1960	Poland	Victory Cup	Altenburg	
175	P. Merghisescu	Not recorded	May 22, 1960	Poland	Victory Cup	Altenburg	
176	Vasile Rusu	Not recorded	May 22, 1960	Poland	Victory Cup	Altenburg	
177	Ion Tutuianu	Not recorded	May 22, 1960	Poland	Victory Cup	Altenburg	
178	Nicloae Capusan	Hooker	Jun 5, 1960	France	Test match	Dinamo Stadium; Bucharest	
179	Valeriu Irimescu	Center	Jun 5, 1960	France	Test match	Dinamo Stadium; Bucharest	
180	Paul Ciobanel	Not recorded	May 24, 1961	Poland	Peace Cup	Bratislava	
181	Cristache Preda	Not recorded	May 24, 1961	Poland	Peace Cup	Bratislava	
182	Mircea Iliescu	Not recorded	May 26, 1961	East Germany	Peace Cup	Brno	
183	Marin Popa	Not recorded	May 25, 1962	East Germany	Peace Cup	Stadion Pogoni; Siedlce	
184	Lica Balcan	Not recorded	May 20, 1963	Bulgaria	Peace Cup	Birlad	
185	Gheorghe Stoica	Not recorded	May 20, 1963	Bulgaria	Peace Cup	Birlad	
186	Gheorghe Dragomirescu-Rahtopol	(Center)	May 20, 1963	Bulgaria	Peace Cup	Birlad	
187	Gheorghe Celea	Not recorded	May 22, 1963	East Germany	Peace Cup	Birlad	
188	Nicolae Baciu	Not recorded	May 20, 1964	Czechoslovakia	Peace Cup	Bautzen	
189	Vasile Dragomir	Not recorded	May 20, 1964	Czechoslovakia	Peace Cup	Bautzen	
190	C. Nedelcu	Not recorded	May 20, 1964	Czechoslovakia	Peace Cup	Bautzen	
191	Gheorghe Nica	Not recorded	May 20, 1964	Czechoslovakia	Peace Cup	Bautzen	
192	Constantin Serban	Not recorded	May 20, 1964	Czechoslovakia	Peace Cup	Bautzen	
193	Constantin Fugigi	(Flanker)	May 20, 1964	Czechoslovakia	Peace Cup	Bautzen	
194	Gheorghe Baltaretu	Not recorded	Nov 14, 1965	West Germany	1965–66 FIRA Nations Cup	Hanover	
195	Constantin Dinu	Not recorded	Nov 14, 1965	West Germany	1965–66 FIRA Nations Cup	Hanover	
196	V. Daiciulescu	Not recorded	May 29, 1966	Czechoslovakia	1965–66 FIRA Nations Cup	Prague	
197	Gheorgie Rascanu	Flanker	Nov 6, 1966	Italy	1965–66 FIRA Nations Cup	Stadio Tommaso Fattori; L'Aquila	
198	Petre Florescu	Not recorded	Not known (Note: Although a specific date is not recorded for this match, ESPN lists this match chronologically between two matches played on November 27, 1966 and May 14, 1967.)	Poland	Test match	Gdańsk	
199	V. Mihalascu	Not recorded	Not known	Poland	Test match	Gdańsk	
200	V. Onutiu	Not recorded	Not known	Poland	Test match	Gdańsk	
201	Petre Veluda	Not recorded	Not known	Poland	Test match	Gdańsk	
202	M. Oblemenco	Fly-half	May 14, 1967	Italy	1966–67 FIRA Nations Cup	Dinamo Stadium; Bucharest	
203	Mihai Serbu	Flanker	May 14, 1967	Italy	1966–67 FIRA Nations Cup	Dinamo Stadium; Bucharest	
204	Victor Marinescu	Not recorded	May 28, 1967	Portugal	1966–67 FIRA Nations Cup	Estádio Universitário de Lisboa; Lisbon	
205	Valeriu Iorgulescu	(Hooker)	Oct 29, 1967	West Germany	1967–68 FIRA Nations Cup	Stade Marcel Saupin; Nantes	
206	Radu Durbac	Not recorded	May 26, 1968	Czechoslovakia	1967–68 FIRA Nations Cup	Dinamo Stadium; Bucharest	
207	Radu Ionescue	Not recorded	May 26, 1968	Czechoslovakia	1967–68 FIRA Nations Cup	Dinamo Stadium; Bucharest	
208	Dan Coravu	Wing	Dec 1, 1968	France	1968–69 FIRA Nations Cup	Dinamo Stadium; Bucharest	
209	Mihai Suciu	Wing	Dec 1, 1968	France	1968–69 FIRA Nations Cup	Dinamo Stadium; Bucharest	
210	Mihai Nicolescu	Fly-half	Jun 15, 1969	Poland	1968–69 FIRA Nations Cup	Dinamo Stadium; Bucharest	
211	Gheorghe Daraban	Not recorded	Nov 23, 1969	Czechoslovakia	1969–70 FIRA Nations Cup	Dinamo Stadium; Bucharest	
212	C. Dragulescu	Not recorded	Nov 23, 1969	Czechoslovakia	1969–70 FIRA Nations Cup	Dinamo Stadium; Bucharest	
213	Alexandru Atanasiu	Lock	Oct 25, 1970	Italy	1969–70 FIRA Nations Cup	Stadio Comunale Mario Battaglini; Rovigo	
214	M. Braga	Wing	Oct 25, 1970	Italy	1969–70 FIRA Nations Cup	Stadio Comunale Mario Battaglini; Rovigo	
215	Alexandru Pop	Flanker	Oct 25, 1970	Italy	1969–70 FIRA Nations Cup	Stadio Comunale Mario Battaglini; Rovigo	
216	Sergiu Bargaunas	Scrum-half	Apr 11, 1971	Italy	1970–71 FIRA Nations Cup	Dinamo Stadium; Bucharest	
217	D. Teleasa	Wing	Apr 11, 1971	Italy	1970–71 FIRA Nations Cup	Dinamo Stadium; Bucharest	
218	Dumitru Mihai	(Scrum-half)	Apr 11, 1971	Italy	1970–71 FIRA Nations Cup	Dinamo Stadium; Bucharest	
219	Ion Constantin	Not recorded	May 9, 1971	Morocco	1970–71 FIRA Nations Cup	COC Stadium; Casablanca	
220	Teodor Miclescu	(Substitute)	May 9, 1971	Morocco	1970–71 FIRA Nations Cup	COC Stadium; Casablanca	
221	Vasile Tata	Scrum-half	Dec 11, 1971	France	1971–72 FIRA Nations Cup	Stade de Sauclières; Béziers	
222	Mihai Bucos	Not recorded	May 2, 1972	Morocco	1971–72 FIRA Nations Cup	Dinamo Stadium; Bucharest	
223	Florin Constantin	Not recorded	May 2, 1972	Morocco	1971–72 FIRA Nations Cup	Dinamo Stadium; Bucharest	
224	Marin Ionescu	Not recorded	May 2, 1972	Morocco	1971–72 FIRA Nations Cup	Dinamo Stadium; Bucharest	
225	Emile Neagu	Not recorded	May 2, 1972	Morocco	1971–72 FIRA Nations Cup	Dinamo Stadium; Bucharest	
226	Mircea Ortelecan	Not recorded	May 2, 1972	Morocco	1971–72 FIRA Nations Cup	Dinamo Stadium; Bucharest	
227	Alexandru Pavlovici	(Substitute)	May 2, 1972	Morocco	1971–72 FIRA Nations Cup	Dinamo Stadium; Bucharest	
228	Mircea Ciornei	Not recorded	Nov 3, 1972	West Germany	Test match	Dinamo Stadium; Bucharest	
229	I. Marica	Not recorded	Nov 3, 1972	West Germany	Test match	Dinamo Stadium; Bucharest	
230	D. Rascanu	Not recorded	Nov 3, 1972	West Germany	Test match	Dinamo Stadium; Bucharest	
231	Nicolae Postolachi	(No. 8)	Nov 3, 1972	West Germany	Test match	Dinamo Stadium; Bucharest	
232	Gheorghe Dumitru	Not recorded	Apr 14, 1973	Spain	1972–73 FIRA Nations Cup	Stade 1 Mai; Constanța	
233	Iuliu Peter	Not recorded	Apr 14, 1973	Spain	1972–73 FIRA Nations Cup	Stade 1 Mai; Constanța	
234	F. Popovici	Not recorded	Apr 14, 1973	Spain	1972–73 FIRA Nations Cup	Stade 1 Mai; Constanța	
235	Ion Tatucu	Not recorded	Apr 14, 1973	Spain	1972–73 FIRA Nations Cup	Stade 1 Mai; Constanța	
236	Stefan Cristea	Not recorded	Apr 20, 1973	Morocco	1972–73 FIRA Nations Cup	Dinamo Stadium; Bucharest	
237	D. Mihalache	Not recorded	Apr 20, 1973	Morocco	1972–73 FIRA Nations Cup	Dinamo Stadium; Bucharest	
238	Petre Motrescu	Not recorded	Apr 20, 1973	Morocco	1972–73 FIRA Nations Cup	Dinamo Stadium; Bucharest	
239	Andrei Hariton	(Substitute)	Apr 20, 1973	Morocco	1972–73 FIRA Nations Cup	Dinamo Stadium; Bucharest	
240	Enciu Stoica	No. 8	Sep 15, 1973	Argentina	1973 Romania rugby union tour of Argentina	Ferro Carril Oeste; Buenos Aires	
241	Nicu Duta	(Fullback)	Sep 15, 1973	Argentina	1973 Romania rugby union tour of Argentina	Ferro Carril Oeste; Buenos Aires	
242	Mircea Munteanu	Not recorded	Oct 27, 1973	West Germany	Test match	Fritz Grunebaum Stadium; Heidelberg	
243	Alexandru Achim	Not recorded	Mar 14, 1974	Poland	1973–74 FIRA Trophy	Dinamo Stadium; Bucharest	
244	Dumitru Alexandru	Not recorded	Mar 14, 1974	Poland	1973–74 FIRA Trophy	Dinamo Stadium; Bucharest	
245	Peter Ianusevici	Not recorded	Mar 14, 1974	Poland	1973–74 FIRA Trophy	Dinamo Stadium; Bucharest	
246	Ion Pintea	Not recorded	Mar 14, 1974	Poland	1973–74 FIRA Trophy	Dinamo Stadium; Bucharest	
247	Nicolae Cioarec	(Prop)	Mar 14, 1974	Poland	1973–74 FIRA Trophy	Dinamo Stadium; Bucharest	
248	Valentin Falcusanu	Not recorded	May 19, 1974	Spain	1973–74 FIRA Trophy	Stadion UMT; Timișoara	
249	Alexandru Ionita	Not recorded	May 19, 1974	Spain	1973–74 FIRA Trophy	Stadion UMT; Timișoara	
250	Dumitru Musat	Not recorded	May 19, 1974	Spain	1973–74 FIRA Trophy	Stadion UMT; Timișoara	
251	Vasile Turlea	(Prop)	May 19, 1974	Spain	1973–74 FIRA Trophy	Stadion UMT; Timișoara	
252	Constantin Budica	(Substitute)	Sep 16, 1974	Czechoslovakia	Test match	Albena	
253	M. Burghelea	Not recorded	Sep 18, 1974	East Germany	Test match	Albena	
254	A. Boroi	Not recorded	May 4, 1975	Spain	1974–75 FIRA Trophy	Campo Universitaria; Madrid	
255	Mircea Paraschiv	Not recorded	May 4, 1975	Spain	1974–75 FIRA Trophy	Campo Universitaria; Madrid	
256	Pompiliu Bors	No. 8	Aug 30, 1975	Junior All Blacks	1975 Romania rugby union tour of New Zealand	Athletic Park; Wellington	
257	G. Dinu	Not recorded	Nov 2, 1975	Poland	1975–76 FIRA Trophy	Dinamo Stadium; Bucharest	
258	Sorin Fuicu	Not recorded	Mar 28, 1976	Netherlands	1975–76 FIRA Trophy	Hilversum	
259	G. Malancu	Not recorded	Mar 28, 1976	Netherlands	1975–76 FIRA Trophy	Hilversum	
260	Florică Murariu	Not recorded	Mar 28, 1976	Netherlands	1975–76 FIRA Trophy	Hilversum	
261	Corneliu Scarlat	Not recorded	Mar 28, 1976	Netherlands	1975–76 FIRA Trophy	Hilversum	
262	Ion Simion	Not recorded	Mar 28, 1976	Netherlands	1975–76 FIRA Trophy	Hilversum	
263	Vasile Varga	Center	Apr 24, 1976	Italy	1975–76 FIRA Trophy	Stadio Ennio Tardini; Parma	
264	Iancu Bacioiu	Not recorded	Sep 19, 1976	Soviet Union	Test match	Burgas	
265	Octavian Corneliu	Not recorded	Sep 19, 1976	Soviet Union	Test match	Burgas	
266	Ion Bucan	(Prop)	Sep 21, 1976	Bulgaria	Test match	Burgas	
267	I. Roman	(Substitute)	Sep 21, 1976	Bulgaria	Test match	Burgas	
268	Eduard Suciu	(Scrum-half)	Sep 21, 1976	Bulgaria	Test match	Burgas	
269	Vasile Cornel	Not recorded	Jun 4, 1977	France XV	Test match	Parc des Princes; Paris	
270	Ion Enache	Center	Nov 26, 1977	Italy	1977–78 FIRA Trophy	Reggio di Calabria	
271	Teodorin Tudose	Fullback	Nov 26, 1977	Italy	1977–78 FIRA Trophy	Reggio di Calabria	
272	Vladimir Vasile	Center	Dec 10, 1977	France	1977–78 FIRA Trophy	Stade Marcel-Michelin; Clermont-Ferrand	
273	Alexandru Marin Bucataru	Not recorded	Apr 9, 1978	Czechoslovakia	1977–78 FIRA Trophy	Dinamo Stadium; Bucharest	
274	Olimpiu Becheș	Center	Apr 22, 1979	Italy	1978–79 FIRA Trophy	Dinamo Stadium; Bucharest	
275	V. Ungureanu	Prop	Apr 22, 1979	Italy	1978–79 FIRA Trophy	Dinamo Stadium; Bucharest	
276	Marian Aldea	Not recorded	May 4, 1979	Soviet Union	1978–79 FIRA Trophy	Harkov	
277	M. Corneliu	Not recorded	May 4, 1979	Soviet Union	1978–79 FIRA Trophy	Harkov	
278	Ion Zafiescu	Center	Oct 6, 1979	Wales XV	1979 Romania rugby union tour of Wales	National Stadium; Cardiff	
279	Stelian Podarascu	Not recorded	Nov 18, 1979	Poland	1979–80 FIRA Trophy	Dinamo Stadium; Bucharest	
280	Marcel Voicu	(Substitute)	Nov 18, 1979	Poland	1979–80 FIRA Trophy	Dinamo Stadium; Bucharest	
281	Ioan Urdea	(Center)	Dec 2, 1979	France	1979–80 FIRA Trophy	Stade de Sapiac; Montauban	
282	M. Chiricencu	Wing	Apr 13, 1980	Italy	1979–80 FIRA Trophy	Stadio Tommaso Fattori; L'Aquila	
283	Adrian Lungu	Center	Apr 13, 1980	Italy	1979–80 FIRA Trophy	Stadio Tommaso Fattori; L'Aquila	
284	Alexandru Bogheanu	Not recorded	Apr 30, 1980	Morocco	1979–80 FIRA Trophy	Stadionul 1 Mai; Constanța	
285	Ștefan Constantin	Not recorded	Apr 30, 1980	Morocco	1979–80 FIRA Trophy	Stadionul 1 Mai; Constanța	
286	Gheorghe Corneliu	Not recorded	Apr 30, 1980	Morocco	1979–80 FIRA Trophy	Stadionul 1 Mai; Constanța	
287	Mihai Holban	Not recorded	Apr 30, 1980	Morocco	1979–80 FIRA Trophy	Stadionul 1 Mai; Constanța	
288	Vasile Ion	Not recorded	Apr 30, 1980	Morocco	1979–80 FIRA Trophy	Stadionul 1 Mai; Constanța	
289	Marin Iordan	Not recorded	Apr 30, 1980	Morocco	1979–80 FIRA Trophy	Stadionul 1 Mai; Constanța	
290	Marin Moț	Not recorded	Apr 30, 1980	Morocco	1979–80 FIRA Trophy	Stadionul 1 Mai; Constanța	
291	Marian Nache	Not recorded	Apr 30, 1980	Morocco	1979–80 FIRA Trophy	Stadionul 1 Mai; Constanța	
292	P. Radoi	Not recorded	Apr 30, 1980	Morocco	1979–80 FIRA Trophy	Stadionul 1 Mai; Constanța	
293	Gheorghe Varzaru	Not recorded	Apr 30, 1980	Morocco	1979–80 FIRA Trophy	Stadionul 1 Mai; Constanța	
294	Marian Zafiescu	Not recorded	Apr 30, 1980	Morocco	1979–80 FIRA Trophy	Stadionul 1 Mai; Constanța	
295	V. Vlad	(Substitute)	Apr 30, 1980	Morocco	1979–80 FIRA Trophy	Stadionul 1 Mai; Constanța	
296	Alexandru Radulescu	Not recorded	May 11, 1980	Soviet Union	1979–80 FIRA Trophy	Dinamo Stadium; Bucharest	
297	Gheorghe Caragea	Lock	Oct 18, 1980	Ireland XV	1980 Romania rugby union tour of Ireland	Lansdowne Road; Dublin	
298	Laurentiu Codoi	Fullback	Oct 18, 1980	Ireland XV	1980 Romania rugby union tour of Ireland	Lansdowne Road; Dublin	
299	Mihai Marghescu	(Center)	Nov 9, 1980	Poland	1980–81 FIRA Trophy	Sochaczew	
300	Gheorghe Florea	Fullback	Sep 26, 1981	Scotland	1981 Romania rugby union tour of Scotland	Murrayfield Stadium; Edinburgh	
301	Emilian Grigore	Not recorded	Apr 4, 1982	West Germany	1981–82 FIRA Trophy	Dinamo Stadium; Bucharest	
302	Marcel Toader	Not recorded	Apr 4, 1982	West Germany	1981–82 FIRA Trophy	Dinamo Stadium; Bucharest	
303	M. Guramare	(Flanker)	Apr 4, 1982	West Germany	1981–82 FIRA Trophy	Dinamo Stadium; Bucharest	
304	Dinu Gheorghe	Prop	Apr 11, 1982	Italy	1981–82 FIRA Trophy	Stadio Comunale Mario Battaglini; Rovigo	
305	V. Csoma	(Substitute)	Mar 27, 1983	West Germany	1982–83 FIRA Trophy	Fritz Grunebaum Stadium; Heidelberg	
306	O. Sugar	No. 8	Apr 10, 1983	Italy	1982–83 FIRA Trophy	Buzau	
307	Vasile Pascu	(Prop)	Apr 10, 1983	Italy	1982–83 FIRA Trophy	Buzau	
308	C. Capmare	Not recorded	Oct 30, 1983	Poland	1983–84 FIRA Trophy	Dinamo Stadium; Bucharest	
309	Laurențiu Constantin	Not recorded	Nov 20, 1983	Soviet Union	1983–84 FIRA Trophy	Dinamo Stadium; Bucharest	
310	F. Macaneata	Not recorded	Nov 20, 1983	Soviet Union	1983–84 FIRA Trophy	Dinamo Stadium; Bucharest	
311	D. Balan	(Prop)	Dec 4, 1983	France	1983–84 FIRA Trophy	Stade Ernest-Wallon; Toulouse	
312	Liviu Hodorcă	Fullback	Apr 22, 1984	Italy	1983–84 FIRA Trophy	Stadio Tommaso Fattori; L'Aquila	
313	Haralambie Dumitraș	(No. 8)	Apr 22, 1984	Italy	1983–84 FIRA Trophy	Stadio Tommaso Fattori; L'Aquila	
314	Gheorghe Leonte	Prop	May 20, 1984	Scotland	Test match	Dinamo Stadium; Bucharest	
315	Teodor Coman	Not recorded	Dec 16, 1984	Spain	1984–85 FIRA Trophy	Campo Universitaria; Madrid	
316	Gheorghe Ion	Not recorded	Dec 16, 1984	Spain	1984–85 FIRA Trophy	Campo Universitaria; Madrid	
317	Octavian Morariu	Not recorded	Dec 16, 1984	Spain	1984–85 FIRA Trophy	Campo Universitaria; Madrid	
318	Vasile David	(Center)	Dec 16, 1984	Spain	1984–85 FIRA Trophy	Campo Universitaria; Madrid	
319	Romeo Bezușcu	Fly-half	Apr 14, 1985	Italy	1984–85 FIRA Trophy	Brasov	
320	M. Giucal	Flanker	Apr 14, 1985	Italy	1984–85 FIRA Trophy	Brasov	
321	Adrian Pllotschi	Wing	Apr 14, 1985	Italy	1984–85 FIRA Trophy	Brasov	
322	D. Tunaru	Prop	Apr 14, 1985	Italy	1984–85 FIRA Trophy	Brasov	
323	S. Galan	(No. 8)	Apr 14, 1985	Italy	1984–85 FIRA Trophy	Brasov	
324	I. Dragnea	Not recorded	May 12, 1985	Tunisia	1984–85 FIRA Trophy	Barlad	
325	V. Nastase	Not recorded	May 12, 1985	Tunisia	1984–85 FIRA Trophy	Barlad	
326	L.T. Constantin	Not recorded	May 31, 1985	Soviet Union	1984–85 FIRA Trophy	Kyiv	
327	N. Copil	Not recorded	May 31, 1985	Soviet Union	1984–85 FIRA Trophy	Kyiv	
328	T. Constantin	Not recorded	Oct 20, 1985	Soviet Union	1985–87 FIRA Trophy	Dinamo Stadium; Bucharest	
329	Ștefan Tofan	Not recorded	Oct 20, 1985	Soviet Union	1985–87 FIRA Trophy	Dinamo Stadium; Bucharest	
330	Valere Tufa	Not recorded	Oct 20, 1985	Soviet Union	1985–87 FIRA Trophy	Dinamo Stadium; Bucharest	
331	O. Tepurica	(Substitute)	Oct 20, 1985	Soviet Union	1985–87 FIRA Trophy	Dinamo Stadium; Bucharest	
332	P. Petrisor	Prop	Dec 7, 1985	Italy	1985–87 FIRA Trophy	Stadio Tommaso Fattori; L'Aquila	
333	Cristian Raducanu	Flanker	Dec 7, 1985	Italy	1985–87 FIRA Trophy	Stadio Tommaso Fattori; L'Aquila	
334	R. Voinov	Wing	Dec 7, 1985	Italy	1985–87 FIRA Trophy	Stadio Tommaso Fattori; L'Aquila	
335	Ioan Doja	Not recorded	Feb 22, 1986	Portugal	1985–87 FIRA Trophy	Barreiro	
336	Gelu Ignat	Not recorded	Feb 22, 1986	Portugal	1985–87 FIRA Trophy	Barreiro	
337	V. Giuglea	Flanker	Mar 29, 1986	Scotland	Test match	Dinamo Stadium; Bucharest	
338	Florea Opriș	Prop	Apr 12, 1986	France	1985–87 FIRA Trophy	Stade Nord; Lille	
339	F. Nistor	Not recorded	Oct 5, 1986	Tunisia	1985–87 FIRA Trophy	Stadionul 1 Mai; Constanța	
340	Cornel Popescu	Not recorded	Oct 5, 1986	Tunisia	1985–87 FIRA Trophy	Stadionul 1 Mai; Constanța	
341	Nicolae Vereș	Not recorded	Oct 5, 1986	Tunisia	1985–87 FIRA Trophy	Stadionul 1 Mai; Constanța	
342	S. Seceleanu	Not recorded	Oct 18, 1986	Portugal	1985–87 FIRA Trophy	Birlad	
343	Ioan Stroe	Not recorded	Oct 18, 1986	Portugal	1985–87 FIRA Trophy	Birlad	
344	Emilian Necula	No. 8	Apr 12, 1987	Italy	1985–87 FIRA Trophy	Stadionul 1 Mai; Constanța	
345	Vasile Ilcă	Hooker	May 28, 1987	France	1987 Rugby World Cup	Athletic Park; Wellington	
346	D. Coliba	Hooker	Nov 11, 1987	France	1987–89 FIRA Trophy	Stade Armandie; Agen	
347	A. Piti	Fullback	Nov 11, 1987	France	1987–89 FIRA Trophy	Stade Armandie; Agen	
348	Adrian Tinca	Center	Nov 11, 1987	France	1987–89 FIRA Trophy	Stade Armandie; Agen	
349	M. Leuciuc	(Flanker)	Nov 11, 1987	France	1987–89 FIRA Trophy	Stade Armandie; Agen	
350	Dan Boldor	Wing	Apr 2, 1988	Italy	1987–89 FIRA Trophy	San Siro; Milan	
351	George Dumitrescu	Prop	Apr 2, 1988	Italy	1987–89 FIRA Trophy	San Siro; Milan	
352	Daniel Neaga	Scrum-half	Apr 2, 1988	Italy	1987–89 FIRA Trophy	San Siro; Milan	
353	Sandu Ciorăscu	Not recorded	Sep 17, 1988	United States	Test match	Sparta Stadium; Moscow	
354	A. Man	Not recorded	Sep 17, 1988	United States	Test match	Sparta Stadium; Moscow	
355	M. Motoc	(Substitute)	Sep 17, 1988	United States	Test match	Sparta Stadium; Moscow	
356	Nicolae Răcean	Not recorded	Sep 20, 1988	Soviet Union	Test match	Sparta Stadium; Moscow	
357	Nicolae Fulina	Center	Nov 26, 1988	France	1987–89 FIRA Trophy	Dinamo Stadium; Bucharest	
358	Traian Oroian	(Flanker)	Nov 26, 1988	France	1987–89 FIRA Trophy	Dinamo Stadium; Bucharest	
359	S. Chirila	Not recorded	May 21, 1989	Spain	1987–89 FIRA Trophy	Valence-d'Agen	
360	Z. Vasuleanu	Not recorded	May 21, 1989	Spain	1987–89 FIRA Trophy	Valence-d'Agen	
361	C. Carp	Not recorded	Sep 24, 1989	Zimbabwe	Test match	Brasov	
362	A. Domocos	Not recorded	Sep 24, 1989	Zimbabwe	Test match	Brasov	
363	Cătălin Sasu	Not recorded	Sep 24, 1989	Zimbabwe	Test match	Brasov	
364	George Sava	(Center)	Sep 24, 1989	Zimbabwe	Test match	Brasov	
365	B. Serban	Not recorded	Oct 14, 1989	Samoa	Test match	Dinamo Stadium; Bucharest	
366	Constantin Cojocariu	Lock	Apr 14, 1990	Italy	1989–90 FIRA Trophy	Frascati	
367	Neculai Nichitean	Fly-half	Apr 14, 1990	Italy	1989–90 FIRA Trophy	Frascati	
368	Gheorghe Dinu	(Flanker)	Apr 14, 1990	Italy	1989–90 FIRA Trophy	Frascati	
369	Marian Dumitru	Fullback	May 24, 1990	France	1989–90 FIRA Trophy	Stade Jacques-Fouroux; Auch	
370	Constantin Stan	(Prop)	Sep 30, 1990	Netherlands	1991 Rugby World Cup Qualifier	Stadio Comunale di Monigo; Treviso	
371	Tiberiu Brînză	No. 8	Oct 7, 1990	Italy	1991 Rugby World Cup Qualifier	Stadio Plebiscito; Padua	
372	T. Radu	Scrum-half	Jun 9, 1991	New Zealand XV	1991 Romania rugby union tour of New Zealand	Eden Park; Auckland	
373	Vasile Brici	(Fullback)	Jun 9, 1991	New Zealand XV	1991 Romania rugby union tour of New Zealand	Eden Park; Auckland	
374	Vasile Doja	Flanker	Jun 22, 1991	France	1990–92 FIRA Trophy	Dinamo Stadium; Bucharest	
375	Lucian Colceriu	Wing	Aug 31, 1991	Scotland	Test match	Dinamo Stadium; Bucharest	
376	Andrei Gurănescu	Flanker	Aug 31, 1991	Scotland	Test match	Dinamo Stadium; Bucharest	
377	Florian Ion	Fly-half	Aug 31, 1991	Scotland	Test match	Dinamo Stadium; Bucharest	
378	Gabriel Vlad	(Prop)	Oct 9, 1991	Canada	1991 Rugby World Cup	Le Stade de Toulouse; Toulouse	
379	Micusor Marin	Flanker	Oct 12, 1991	Fiji	1991 Rugby World Cup	Parc Municipal des Sports; Brive-la-Gaillarde	
380	Ilie Ivanciuc	(Fly-half)	Oct 12, 1991	Fiji	1991 Rugby World Cup	Parc Municipal des Sports; Brive-la-Gaillarde	
381	Gheorghe Solomie	Not recorded	Apr 4, 1992	Spain	1990–92 FIRA Trophy	Campo Universitaria; Madrid	
382	N. Tranca	Not recorded	Apr 4, 1992	Spain	1990–92 FIRA Trophy	Campo Universitaria; Madrid	
383	George Tutunea	(Scrum-half)	Apr 4, 1992	Spain	1990–92 FIRA Trophy	Campo Universitaria; Madrid	
384	Mihai Foca	Scrum-half	Apr 18, 1992	Italy	1990–92 FIRA Trophy	Stadio Comunale Mario Battaglini; Rovigo	
385	Viorel Ionescu	Prop	Apr 18, 1992	Italy	1990–92 FIRA Trophy	Stadio Comunale Mario Battaglini; Rovigo	
386	Ionut Seceleanu	No. 8	Apr 18, 1992	Italy	1990–92 FIRA Trophy	Stadio Comunale Mario Battaglini; Rovigo	
387	I. Ratiu	(Flanker)	Apr 18, 1992	Italy	1990–92 FIRA Trophy	Stadio Comunale Mario Battaglini; Rovigo	
388	Tudor Constantin	Not recorded	May 10, 1992	CIS	1990–92 FIRA Trophy	Dinamo Stadium; Bucharest	
389	Christian Gheorghe	Hooker	Oct 1, 1992	Italy	1992–93 FIRA Preliminary Tournament	Stadio Flaminio; Rome	
390	Calin Fugigi	Scrum-half	Oct 31, 1992	Argentina	Test match	Dinamo Stadium; Bucharest	
391	Adrian Mitorcariu	Wing	Oct 31, 1992	Argentina	Test match	Dinamo Stadium; Bucharest	
392	Adrian Girbu	(Flanker)	Oct 31, 1992	Argentina	Test match	Dinamo Stadium; Bucharest	
393	Gabriel Cilinca	Not recorded	Apr 3, 1993	Portugal	1992–93 FIRA Preliminary Tournament	Estádio Universitário de Lisboa; Lisbon	
394	Marius Nedelcu	Not recorded	Apr 3, 1993	Portugal	1992–93 FIRA Preliminary Tournament	Estádio Universitário de Lisboa; Lisbon	
395	Constantin Patrichi	(Substitute)	Apr 3, 1993	Portugal	1992–93 FIRA Preliminary Tournament	Estádio Universitário de Lisboa; Lisbon	
396	Nicolae Popa	Not recorded	May 8, 1993	Tunisia	1992–93 FIRA Preliminary Tournament	Dinamo Stadium; Bucharest	
397	Ovidiu Slușariuc	(No. 8)	May 8, 1993	Tunisia	1992–93 FIRA Preliminary Tournament	Dinamo Stadium; Bucharest	
398	Cornel Gheorge	(Prop)	May 20, 1993	France	Test match	Dinamo Stadium; Bucharest	
399	G. Irisescu	(Substitute)	May 29, 1993	Spain	1992–93 FIRA Preliminary Tournament	Parcul Copilului; Bucharest	
400	S. Rosu	Fly-half	Nov 13, 1993	Ireland	Test match	Lansdowne Road; Dublin	
401	Robert Cioca	Not recorded	Apr 24, 1994	Spain	1992–94 FIRA Trophy	La Romareda; Zaragoza	
402	Cătălin Drăguceanu	Not recorded	Apr 24, 1994	Spain	1992–94 FIRA Trophy	La Romareda; Zaragoza	
403	Vasile Flutur	(Scrum-half)	May 2, 1994	Germany	1995 Rugby World Cup Qualifier	Dinamo Stadium; Bucharest	
404	D. Popa	(Substitute)	May 2, 1994	Germany	1995 Rugby World Cup Qualifier	Dinamo Stadium; Bucharest	
405	Cristian Branescu	Lock	Oct 1, 1994	Italy	1995 Rugby World Cup Qualifier	Stadio Santa Maria Goretti; Catania	
406	Alexandru Gealapu	Flanker	Oct 1, 1994	Italy	1995 Rugby World Cup Qualifier	Stadio Santa Maria Goretti; Catania	
407	Leodor Costea	Prop	Nov 12, 1994	England	Test match	Twickenham Stadium; London	
408	Ionel Negreci	Hooker	Nov 12, 1994	England	Test match	Twickenham Stadium; London	
409	Mihai Vioreanu	Center	Nov 12, 1994	England	Test match	Twickenham Stadium; London	
410	Florin Marioara	(Prop)	Nov 12, 1994	England	Test match	Twickenham Stadium; London	
411	Romeo Gontineac	Center	Apr 8, 1995	France	Test match	Dinamo Stadium; Bucharest	
412	Ionel Rotaru	Wing	May 3, 1995	Japan	Test match	Prince Chichibu Memorial Stadium; Tokyo	
413	Vasile Besarau	Fly-half	Oct 14, 1995	Argentina	Test match	Ferro Carril Oeste; Buenos Aires	
414	Tiberiu Luca	Center	Oct 14, 1995	Argentina	Test match	Ferro Carril Oeste; Buenos Aires	
415	Valentin Maftei	Fullback	Oct 14, 1995	Argentina	Test match	Ferro Carril Oeste; Buenos Aires	
416	Dragos Niculae	(Prop)	Oct 14, 1995	Argentina	Test match	Ferro Carril Oeste; Buenos Aires	
417	Adrian Salageanu	(Prop)	Oct 14, 1995	Argentina	Test match	Ferro Carril Oeste; Buenos Aires	
418	Constantin Dragnea	Scrum-half	Oct 17, 1995	France	Test match	Cancha Del Atletico; Tucumán	
419	Marius Florescu	Wing	Oct 17, 1995	France	Test match	Cancha Del Atletico; Tucumán	
420	Virgil Popisteanu	Fly-half	Oct 17, 1995	France	Test match	Cancha Del Atletico; Tucumán	
421	Margarit Radoi	Hooker	Oct 17, 1995	France	Test match	Cancha Del Atletico; Tucumán	
422	Radu Fugigi	Wing	Oct 21, 1995	Italy	1995–97 FIRA Trophy	Ferro Carril Oeste; Buenos Aires	
423	A. Stanca	Not recorded	Apr 13, 1996	Portugal	1995–97 FIRA Trophy	Dinamo Stadium; Bucharest	
424	Lucian Sîrbu	(Scrum-half)	Apr 13, 1996	Portugal	1995–97 FIRA Trophy	Dinamo Stadium; Bucharest	
425	Eugen Apjok	Fly-half	Apr 19, 1996	Belgium	1995–97 FIRA Trophy	Dinamo Stadium; Bucharest	
426	Gabriel Brezoianu	Center	Apr 19, 1996	Belgium	1995–97 FIRA Trophy	Dinamo Stadium; Bucharest	
427	Mihaita Dragomir	Lock	Apr 19, 1996	Belgium	1995–97 FIRA Trophy	Dinamo Stadium; Bucharest	
428	Daniel Iacob	Flanker	Apr 19, 1996	Belgium	1995–97 FIRA Trophy	Dinamo Stadium; Bucharest	
429	Vasile Lucaci	Prop	Apr 19, 1996	Belgium	1995–97 FIRA Trophy	Dinamo Stadium; Bucharest	
430	Alexandru Manta	Flanker	Apr 19, 1996	Belgium	1995–97 FIRA Trophy	Dinamo Stadium; Bucharest	
431	Sergiu Mocanu	Prop	Apr 19, 1996	Belgium	1995–97 FIRA Trophy	Dinamo Stadium; Bucharest	
432	Erdinci Septar	Lock	Apr 19, 1996	Belgium	1995–97 FIRA Trophy	Dinamo Stadium; Bucharest	
433	Karoly Suiogan	Hooker	Apr 19, 1996	Belgium	1995–97 FIRA Trophy	Dinamo Stadium; Bucharest	
434	Dorin Talaba	Center	Apr 19, 1996	Belgium	1995–97 FIRA Trophy	Dinamo Stadium; Bucharest	
435	Mihai Ungur	Wing	Apr 19, 1996	Belgium	1995–97 FIRA Trophy	Dinamo Stadium; Bucharest	
436	George Chiriac	(Flanker)	Apr 19, 1996	Belgium	1995–97 FIRA Trophy	Dinamo Stadium; Bucharest	
437	Petre Mitu	(Scrum-half)	Apr 19, 1996	Belgium	1995–97 FIRA Trophy	Dinamo Stadium; Bucharest	
438	Cristian Pingert	(Prop)	Apr 19, 1996	Belgium	1995–97 FIRA Trophy	Dinamo Stadium; Bucharest	
439	Vasile Nedelcu	(Lock)	May 12, 1996	Poland	1995–97 FIRA Trophy	Sochaczew	
440	Florin Corodeanu	Flanker	Jun 1, 1997	France	Test match	Dinamo Stadium; Bucharest	
441	Serban Guranescu	Fly-half	Aug 30, 1997	Wales	Test match	Racecourse Ground; Wrexham	
442	Marius Iacob	Scrum-half	Aug 30, 1997	Wales	Test match	Racecourse Ground; Wrexham	
443	Florin Ruxanda	(Flanker)	Aug 30, 1997	Wales	Test match	Racecourse Ground; Wrexham	
444	Dumitru Bozian	Prop	Oct 4, 1997	Belgium	1999 Rugby World Cup Qualifier	King Baudouin Stadium; Brussels	
445	Ionuț Tofan	Fly-half	Oct 4, 1997	Belgium	1999 Rugby World Cup Qualifier	King Baudouin Stadium; Brussels	
446	Lucian Dumitrescu	(Prop)	Oct 4, 1997	Belgium	1999 Rugby World Cup Qualifier	King Baudouin Stadium; Brussels	
447	Cezar Popescu	(Prop)	Oct 4, 1997	Belgium	1999 Rugby World Cup Qualifier	King Baudouin Stadium; Brussels	
448	Razvan Stanca	(Scrum-half)	Oct 22, 1997	France	Latin Cup	Stade Antoine Beguere; Lourdes	
449	Cristian Hîldan	Wing	Apr 25, 1998	Netherlands	1999 Rugby World Cup Qualifier	Dinamo Stadium; Bucharest	
450	Gheorghe Simion	Flanker	Apr 25, 1998	Netherlands	1999 Rugby World Cup Qualifier	Dinamo Stadium; Bucharest	
451	Petru Bălan	(Prop)	Apr 25, 1998	Netherlands	1999 Rugby World Cup Qualifier	Dinamo Stadium; Bucharest	
452	Alin Petrache	(Back row)	Apr 25, 1998	Netherlands	1999 Rugby World Cup Qualifier	Dinamo Stadium; Bucharest	
453	Cristian Lupu	(Center)	May 2, 1998	Poland	1999 Rugby World Cup Qualifier	Dinamo Stadium; Bucharest	
454	Mihai Ciolacu	(Wing)	May 30, 1998	Ukraine	1999 Rugby World Cup Qualifier	Kharkiv	
455	Marius Codea	(Fullback)	May 30, 1998	Ukraine	1999 Rugby World Cup Qualifier	Kharkiv	
456	Ștefan Demici	(Hooker)	Aug 8, 1998	Argentina	1998 Romania rugby union tour of Argentina	Centro Cordoba; Rosario	
457	Marian Dumitru	(Wing)	Aug 8, 1998	Argentina	1998 Romania rugby union tour of Argentina	Centro Cordoba; Rosario	
458	Răzvan Mavrodin	Hooker	Nov 18, 1998	Georgia	1999 Rugby World Cup Qualifier	Lansdowne Road; Dublin	
459	Roland Vusec	Fly-half	Nov 18, 1998	Georgia	1999 Rugby World Cup Qualifier	Lansdowne Road; Dublin	
460	Laurențiu Rotaru	(Prop)	Jun 3, 1999	France	1999 June rugby union tests	Stade Pierre-Antoine; Castres	
461	Daniel Chiriac	Lock	Aug 28, 1999	Scotland	1999 Rugby World Cup warm-up matches	Hampden Park; Glasgow	
462	Cristian Săuan	Wing	Aug 28, 1999	Scotland	1999 Rugby World Cup warm-up matches	Hampden Park; Glasgow	
463	Valeriu Chirita	(Flanker)	Aug 28, 1999	Scotland	1999 Rugby World Cup warm-up matches	Hampden Park; Glasgow	
464	Aurel Popean	(Flanker)	Aug 28, 1999	Scotland	1999 Rugby World Cup warm-up matches	Hampden Park; Glasgow	
465	Dan Tudosa	(Prop)	Aug 28, 1999	Scotland	1999 Rugby World Cup warm-up matches	Hampden Park; Glasgow	
466	Nicolae Dragoș Dima	(Prop)	Oct 3, 1999	Australia	1999 Rugby World Cup	Ravenhill Stadium; Belfast	
467	Costica Mersoiu	Not recorded	Feb 6, 2000	Morocco	2000 European Nations Cup First Division	COC Stadium; Casablanca	
468	G. Olarasu	Not recorded	Feb 6, 2000	Morocco	2000 European Nations Cup First Division	COC Stadium; Casablanca	
469	Marius Olarasu	Not recorded	Feb 6, 2000	Morocco	2000 European Nations Cup First Division	COC Stadium; Casablanca	
470	Sorin Rentea	Not recorded	Feb 6, 2000	Morocco	2000 European Nations Cup First Division	COC Stadium; Casablanca	
471	Ovidiu Tonița	Not recorded	Feb 6, 2000	Morocco	2000 European Nations Cup First Division	COC Stadium; Casablanca	
472	Cyprian Vlasceanu	Not recorded	Feb 6, 2000	Morocco	2000 European Nations Cup First Division	COC Stadium; Casablanca	
473	Florin Balmus	(Wing)	Feb 6, 2000	Morocco	2000 European Nations Cup First Division	COC Stadium; Casablanca	
474	Filip Dinu	(Hooker)	Feb 6, 2000	Morocco	2000 European Nations Cup First Division	COC Stadium; Casablanca	
475	Marian Ezaru	Center	Mar 5, 2000	Portugal	2000 European Nations Cup First Division	Dinamo Stadium; Bucharest	
476	Ionat Ciofu	Lock	Nov 18, 2000	Italy	2000 end-of-year rugby union internationals	Stadio Ciro Vigorito; Benevento	
477	Silviu Florea	Prop	Nov 18, 2000	Italy	2000 end-of-year rugby union internationals	Stadio Ciro Vigorito; Benevento	
478	Vasile Ghioc	Wing	Nov 18, 2000	Italy	2000 end-of-year rugby union internationals	Stadio Ciro Vigorito; Benevento	
479	Bogdan Munteanu	Fly-half	Nov 18, 2000	Italy	2000 end-of-year rugby union internationals	Stadio Ciro Vigorito; Benevento	
480	Nicolae Oprea	Center	Nov 18, 2000	Italy	2000 end-of-year rugby union internationals	Stadio Ciro Vigorito; Benevento	
481	Valentin Samuil	(Lock)	Nov 18, 2000	Italy	2000 end-of-year rugby union internationals	Stadio Ciro Vigorito; Benevento	
482	Marcel Socaciu	(Prop)	Nov 18, 2000	Italy	2000 end-of-year rugby union internationals	Stadio Ciro Vigorito; Benevento	
483	Petrișor Toderașc	(Prop)	Nov 18, 2000	Italy	2000 end-of-year rugby union internationals	Stadio Ciro Vigorito; Benevento	
484	Marius Picoiu	Wing	Feb 4, 2001	Portugal	2001 European Nations Cup First Division	Estádio Universitário de Lisboa; Lisbon	
485	Ion Popescu	Prop	Feb 4, 2001	Portugal	2001 European Nations Cup First Division	Estádio Universitário de Lisboa; Lisbon	
486	Marian Constantin	Hooker	Feb 4, 2001	Portugal	2001 European Nations Cup First Division	Estádio Universitário de Lisboa; Lisbon	
487	Sorin Socol	Lock	Feb 18, 2001	Spain	2001 European Nations Cup First Division	Seville	
488	Marius Dragomir	(Lock)	March 4, 2001	Netherlands	2001 European Nations Cup First Division	Stadionul 1 Mai; Constanța	
489	Cristian Podea	(Scrum-half)	Apr 7, 2001	Georgia	2001 European Nations Cup First Division	Dinamo Stadium; Bucharest	
490	Marius Bejan	Flanker	Jun 2, 2001	Ireland	2001 June rugby union tests	Dinamo Stadium; Bucharest	
491	Ion Teodorescu	Wing	Jun 2, 2001	Ireland	2001 June rugby union tests	Dinamo Stadium; Bucharest	
492	Stefan Soare	(Prop)	Jun 2, 2001	Ireland	2001 June rugby union tests	Dinamo Stadium; Bucharest	
493	Flavius Dobre	Center	Nov 17, 2001	England	Test match	Twickenham Stadium; London	
494	Cristian Petre	Lock	Nov 17, 2001	England	Test match	Twickenham Stadium; London	
495	George Pasache	(Flanker)	Nov 17, 2001	England	Test match	Twickenham Stadium; London	
496	Mihai Dumitru	Prop	Feb 3, 2002	Portugal	2001–02 European Nations Cup First Division	Dinamo Stadium; Bucharest	
497	Remus Lungu	Fly-half	Feb 3, 2002	Portugal	2001–02 European Nations Cup First Division	Dinamo Stadium; Bucharest	
498	Marius Țincu	(Hooker)	Feb 3, 2002	Portugal	2001–02 European Nations Cup First Division	Dinamo Stadium; Bucharest	
499	Adrian Mihai Voicu	(Wing)	Feb 3, 2002	Portugal	2001–02 European Nations Cup First Division	Dinamo Stadium; Bucharest	
500	Marius Coltuneac	(Center)	Feb 17, 2002	Spain	2001–02 European Nations Cup First Division	Stadionul 1 Mai; Constanța	
501	Iulian Dumitraș	(Center)	Mar 3, 2002	Netherlands	2001–02 European Nations Cup First Division	Amsterdam	
502	Augustin Petrechei	(Lock)	Sep 7, 2002	Ireland	2002 Romania rugby union tour of British Isles	Thomond Park; Limerick	
503	Dănuț Dumbravă	Fullback	Nov 1, 2002	Wales	2002 end-of-year rugby union internationals	Racecourse Ground; Wrexham	
504	Stefan Dragnea	(Lock)	Nov 9, 2002	Scotland	2002 end-of-year rugby union internationals	Murrayfield Stadium; Edinburgh	
505	Marius Miu	No. 8	Feb 22, 2003	Portugal	2003–04 European Nations Cup First Division	Estádio Universitário de Lisboa; Lisbon	
506	Cătălin Nicolae	Fullback	Feb 22, 2003	Portugal	2003–04 European Nations Cup First Division	Estádio Universitário de Lisboa; Lisbon	
507	Marian Butugan	(Lock)	Feb 22, 2003	Portugal	2003–04 European Nations Cup First Division	Estádio Universitário de Lisboa; Lisbon	
508	Bogdan Bălan	(Prop)	Mar 30, 2003	Georgia	2003–04 European Nations Cup First Division	National Stadium; Tbilisi	
509	Alexandru Lacatus	Flanker	Jun 22, 2003	Czech Republic	2003–04 European Nations Cup First Division	Tatra Smíchov; Prague	
510	Iulian Andrei	(Scrum-half)	Jun 22, 2003	Czech Republic	2003–04 European Nations Cup First Division	Tatra Smíchov; Prague	
511	Cosmin Rațiu	(Flanker)	Jun 22, 2003	Czech Republic	2003–04 European Nations Cup First Division	Tatra Smíchov; Prague	
512	Bogdan Voicu	(Wing)	Jun 22, 2003	Czech Republic	2003–04 European Nations Cup First Division	Tatra Smíchov; Prague	
513	Alex Tudori	(Flanker)	Aug 22, 2003	France	2003 Rugby World Cup warm-up matches	Stade Felix Bollaert; Lens	
514	Marius Niculai	(No. 8)	Oct 11, 2003	Ireland	2003 Rugby World Cup	Central Coast Stadium; Gosford	
515	Paulică Ion	(Prop)	Oct 22, 2003	Argentina	2003 Rugby World Cup	Sydney Football Stadium; Sydney	
516	Cornel Tatu	(Flanker)	Oct 22, 2003	Argentina	2003 Rugby World Cup	Sydney Football Stadium; Sydney	
517	Madalin Baraulea	Flanker	Feb 14, 2004	Czech Republic	2003–04 European Nations Cup First Division	Dinamo Stadium; Bucharest	
518	Constantin Gheară	Wing	Feb 14, 2004	Czech Republic	2003–04 European Nations Cup First Division	Dinamo Stadium; Bucharest	
519	Bogdan Zebega	Hooker	Feb 14, 2004	Czech Republic	2003–04 European Nations Cup First Division	Dinamo Stadium; Bucharest	
520	Alexandru Lupu	(Scrum-half)	Feb 14, 2004	Czech Republic	2003–04 European Nations Cup First Division	Dinamo Stadium; Bucharest	
521	Teodor Munteanu	(Hooker)	Feb 14, 2004	Czech Republic	2003–04 European Nations Cup First Division	Dinamo Stadium; Bucharest	
522	Marius Tigora	(Back row)	Feb 14, 2004	Czech Republic	2003–04 European Nations Cup First Division	Dinamo Stadium; Bucharest	
523	Ionuț Dimofte	(Utility back)	Jun 26, 2004	Italy	2004 June rugby union tests	Dinamo Stadium; Bucharest	
524	Stefan Dumitru	(Wing)	Jun 26, 2004	Italy	2004 June rugby union tests	Dinamo Stadium; Bucharest	
525	Valentin Ursache	(Lock)	Jun 26, 2004	Italy	2004 June rugby union tests	Dinamo Stadium; Bucharest	
526	George Oprisor	(Flanker)	Nov 12, 2004	Wales	2004 end-of-year rugby union internationals	Millennium Stadium; Cardiff	
527	Valentin Calafeteanu	Scrum-half	Nov 20, 2004	Japan	2004 Japan rugby union tour of Europe	Dinamo Stadium; Bucharest	
528	Darie Curea	(Fly-half)	Feb 26, 2005	Russia	2004–06 European Nations Cup First Division	Stadion UMT; Timișoara	
529	Dan Vlad	(Wing)	May 29, 2005	United States	2005 Super Cup	Prince Chichibu Memorial Stadium; Tokyo	
530	Cătălin Fercu	Fullback	Nov 19, 2005	Canada	2005 end-of-year rugby union internationals	Stadionul Ghencea; Bucharest	
531	Csaba Gál	(Center)	Nov 26, 2005	Ireland	2005 end-of-year rugby union internationals	Lansdowne Road; Dublin	
532	Nicolae Nere	(Prop)	Mar 11, 2006	Czech Republic	2004–06 European Nations Cup First Division	La Teste	
533	Robert Dascălu	Center	Jun 3, 2006	Ukraine	2004–06 European Nations Cup First Division	Kyiv	
534	Mihai Macovei	(Flanker)	Jun 3, 2006	Ukraine	2004–06 European Nations Cup First Division	Kyiv	
535	Florin Vlaicu	(Utility back)	Jun 3, 2006	Ukraine	2004–06 European Nations Cup First Division	Kyiv	
536	Stelian Burcea	(Flanker)	Jun 17, 2006	France	2006 June rugby union tests	Stadionul Cotroceni; Bucharest	
537	Ciprian Caplescu	(Scrum-half)	Mar 10, 2007	Spain	2006–08 European Nations Cup First Division	Stadionul Ghencea; Bucharest	
538	Daniel Carpo	(Back row)	Jun 10, 2007	Italy A	2007 Nations Cup	Stadionul Arcul de Triumf; Bucharest	
539	Valentin Popârlan	(Lock)	Jun 16, 2007	Namibia	2007 Nations Cup	Stadionul Arcul de Triumf; Bucharest	
540	Ștefan Ciuntu	Wing	Sep 29, 2007	New Zealand	2007 Rugby World Cup	Le Stade de Toulouse; Toulouse	
541	Mihai Adascalitei	(Prop)	Nov 4, 2007	Russia	2006–08 European Nations Cup First Division	Stadionul Arcul de Triumf; Bucharest	
542	Florin Maxim	(Hooker)	Nov 4, 2007	Russia	2006–08 European Nations Cup First Division	Stadionul Arcul de Triumf; Bucharest	
543	Nicolae Rus	(Lock)	Nov 4, 2007	Russia	2006–08 European Nations Cup First Division	Stadionul Arcul de Triumf; Bucharest	
544	Vasile Rus	(Back row)	Nov 4, 2007	Russia	2006–08 European Nations Cup First Division	Stadionul Arcul de Triumf; Bucharest	
545	Radu Basalau	Prop	Dec 1, 2007	Portugal	2006–08 European Nations Cup First Division	Estádio Universitário de Lisboa; Lisbon	
546	Gheorghita Bigiu	Wing	Dec 1, 2007	Portugal	2006–08 European Nations Cup First Division	Estádio Universitário de Lisboa; Lisbon	
547	Alin Coste	Lock	Dec 1, 2007	Portugal	2006–08 European Nations Cup First Division	Estádio Universitário de Lisboa; Lisbon	
548	Marcel Mihalache	Hooker	Dec 1, 2007	Portugal	2006–08 European Nations Cup First Division	Estádio Universitário de Lisboa; Lisbon	
549	Mihai Lazăr	Prop	Mar 22, 2008	Czech Republic	2006–08 European Nations Cup First Division	Dinamo Stadium; Bucharest	
550	Alexandru Marin	Wing	Mar 22, 2008	Czech Republic	2006–08 European Nations Cup First Division	Dinamo Stadium; Bucharest	
551	Andrei Rădoi	(Hooker)	Mar 22, 2008	Czech Republic	2006–08 European Nations Cup First Division	Dinamo Stadium; Bucharest	
552	Laurentiu Sirbe	(Lock)	Mar 22, 2008	Czech Republic	2006–08 European Nations Cup First Division	Dinamo Stadium; Bucharest	
553	Florin Tasca	Hooker	Jun 11, 2008	Uruguay	2008 Nations Cup	Stadionul Arcul de Triumf; Bucharest	
554	Florin Surugiu	(Scrum-half)	Jun 11, 2008	Uruguay	2008 Nations Cup	Stadionul Arcul de Triumf; Bucharest	
555	Adrian Barbuliceanu	Fullback	Jun 15, 2008	Russia	2008 Nations Cup	Stadionul Arcul de Triumf; Bucharest	
556	Laurent Giucal	Lock	Feb 7, 2009	Spain	2011 Rugby World Cup Qualifier; 2008–10 European Nations Cup First Division	Campo Universitaria; Madrid	
557	Mădălin Lemnaru	Wing	Feb 7, 2009	Spain	2011 Rugby World Cup Qualifier; 2008–10 European Nations Cup First Division	Campo Universitaria; Madrid	
558	Cătălin Beca	(Hooker)	Feb 7, 2009	Spain	2011 Rugby World Cup Qualifier; 2008–10 European Nations Cup First Division	Campo Universitaria; Madrid	
559	Daniel Ianuș	(Flanker)	Feb 7, 2009	Spain	2011 Rugby World Cup Qualifier; 2008–10 European Nations Cup First Division	Campo Universitaria; Madrid	
560	Dorin Manole	Fly-half	Feb 14, 2009	Germany	2011 Rugby World Cup Qualifier; 2008–10 European Nations Cup First Division	Fritz Grunebaum Stadium; Heidelberg	
561	Ionuț Botezatu	(Wing)	Feb 14, 2009	Germany	2011 Rugby World Cup Qualifier; 2008–10 European Nations Cup First Division	Fritz Grunebaum Stadium; Heidelberg	
562	André Gorin	(Scrum-half)	Feb 14, 2009	Germany	2011 Rugby World Cup Qualifier; 2008–10 European Nations Cup First Division	Fritz Grunebaum Stadium; Heidelberg	
563	Dan Dumitru	Center	Jun 12, 2009	Uruguay	2009 Nations Cup	Stadionul Arcul de Triumf; Bucharest	
564	Georgel Catuna	Wing	Nov 13, 2009	Italy A	2009 end-of-year rugby union internationals	Stadio Comunale Beltrametti; Piacenza	
565	Sergiu Ursache	(Flanker)	Nov 13, 2009	Italy A	2009 end-of-year rugby union internationals	Stadio Comunale Beltrametti; Piacenza	
566	Viorel Lucaci	(Flanker)	Nov 28, 2009	Fiji	2009 end-of-year rugby union internationals	Stadionul Arcul de Triumf; Bucharest	
567	Vali Ivan	(Scrum-half)	Mar 13, 2010	Georgia	2011 Rugby World Cup Qualifier; 2008–10 European Nations Cup First Division	Stadionul Arcul de Triumf; Bucharest	
568	Sami Maris	(Prop)	May 22, 2010	Ukraine	2011 Rugby World Cup Qualifier	Spartak Stadium; Kyiv	
569	Marius Sirbe	(Lock)	May 22, 2010	Ukraine	2011 Rugby World Cup Qualifier	Spartak Stadium; Kyiv	
570	Ionel Cazan	(Centre)	Jun 15, 2010	Argentina XV	2010 IRB Nations Cup	Stadionul Arcul de Triumf; Bucharest	
571	Vasile Mariscariu	(Prop)	Feb 26, 2011	Russia	2010–12 European Nations Cup First Division	Stadionul Arcul de Triumf; Bucharest	
572	Traian Pllotschi	No. 8	Mar 19, 2011	Spain	2010–12 European Nations Cup First Division	Stadionul Arcul de Triumf; Bucharest	
573	Adrian Apostol	Wing	Jun 10, 2011	Namibia	2011 Nations Cup	Stadionul Arcul de Triumf; Bucharest	
574	Vlad Bădălicescu	Prop	Feb 4, 2012	Portugal	2010–12 European Nations Cup First Division	Stadionul Arcul de Triumf; Bucharest	
575	Cristian Diniș Vârtic	Center	Feb 4, 2012	Portugal	2010–12 European Nations Cup First Division	Stadionul Arcul de Triumf; Bucharest	
576	Andrei Ursache	(Prop)	Feb 4, 2012	Portugal	2010–12 European Nations Cup First Division	Stadionul Arcul de Triumf; Bucharest	
577	Adrian Ion	Flanker	Mar 17, 2012	Spain	2010–12 European Nations Cup First Division	Campo Universitaria; Madrid	
578	Ionut Niacsu	Fullback	Mar 17, 2012	Spain	2010–12 European Nations Cup First Division	Campo Universitaria; Madrid	
579	Marius Dănilă	Lock	Mar 31, 2012	Ukraine	2010–12 European Nations Cup First Division	Stadionul Arcul de Triumf; Bucharest	
580	Marian Gorcioaia	No. 8	Mar 31, 2012	Ukraine	2010–12 European Nations Cup First Division	Stadionul Arcul de Triumf; Bucharest	
581	Mihai Rosca	Wing	Mar 31, 2012	Ukraine	2010–12 European Nations Cup First Division	Stadionul Arcul de Triumf; Bucharest	
582	Vlad Ailenei	(Fullback)	Mar 31, 2012	Ukraine	2010–12 European Nations Cup First Division	Stadionul Arcul de Triumf; Bucharest	
583	Eugen Căpățînă	(Hooker)	Mar 31, 2012	Ukraine	2010–12 European Nations Cup First Division	Stadionul Arcul de Triumf; Bucharest	
584	Otar Turashvili	(Hooker)	Jun 8, 2012	Uruguay	2012 Nations Cup	Stadionul Arcul de Triumf; Bucharest	
585	Andrei Filip	Fly-half	Nov 10, 2012	Japan	2012 end-of-year rugby union internationals	Stadionul Arcul de Triumf; Bucharest	
586	Horațiu Pungea	Prop	Nov 10, 2012	Japan	2012 end-of-year rugby union internationals	Stadionul Arcul de Triumf; Bucharest	
587	Petru Tamba	Prop	Nov 10, 2012	Japan	2012 end-of-year rugby union internationals	Stadionul Arcul de Triumf; Bucharest	
588	Ionut Florea	(Fly-half)	Nov 10, 2012	Japan	2012 end-of-year rugby union internationals	Stadionul Arcul de Triumf; Bucharest	
589	Alexandru Mitu	(No. 8)	Feb 23, 2013	Spain	2015 Rugby World Cup Qualifier; 2012–14 European Nations Cup First Division	Gijón	
590	Adrian Matei	Wing	Mar 16, 2013	Georgia	2015 Rugby World Cup Qualifier; 2012–14 European Nations Cup First Division	Stadionul Arcul de Triumf; Bucharest	
591	Ionuț Dumitru	Wing	Jun 8, 2013	Russia	2013 Nations Cup	Stadionul Arcul de Triumf; Bucharest	
592	Constantin Pristăvița	Prop	Jun 8, 2013	Russia	2013 Nations Cup	Stadionul Arcul de Triumf; Bucharest	
593	Dorin Lazăr	(Lock)	Jun 8, 2013	Russia	2013 Nations Cup	Stadionul Arcul de Triumf; Bucharest	
594	Vlad Nistor	(No. 8)	Jun 8, 2013	Russia	2013 Nations Cup	Stadionul Arcul de Triumf; Bucharest	
595	Florin Ioniță	Wing	Jun 12, 2013	Argentina Jaguares	2013 Nations Cup	Stadionul Arcul de Triumf; Bucharest	
596	Alexandru Țăruș	Prop	Jun 12, 2013	Argentina Jaguares	2013 Nations Cup	Stadionul Arcul de Triumf; Bucharest	
597	Silviu Suciu	(Prop)	Jun 12, 2013	Argentina Jaguares	2013 Nations Cup	Stadionul Arcul de Triumf; Bucharest	
598	Stephen Hihetah	Wing	Jun 16, 2013	Emerging Italy	2013 Nations Cup	Stadionul Arcul de Triumf; Bucharest	
599	Cristian Munteanu	(Lock)	Feb 1, 2014	Portugal	2015 Rugby World Cup Qualifier; 2012–14 European Nations Cup First Division	Cluj Arena; Cluj	
600	Gabriel Conache	Fullback	Jun 13, 2014	Uruguay	2014 Nations Cup	Stadionul Arcul de Triumf; Bucharest	
601	Filip Lazăr	Fly-half	Jun 13, 2014	Uruguay	2014 Nations Cup	Stadionul Arcul de Triumf; Bucharest	
602	Ionel Badiu	Prop	Jun 18, 2014	Russia	2014 Nations Cup	Stadionul Arcul de Triumf; Bucharest	
603	Marian Drenceanu	Lock	Jun 18, 2014	Russia	2014 Nations Cup	Stadionul Arcul de Triumf; Bucharest	
604	Marius Antonescu	(Lock)	Jun 22, 2014	Emerging Ireland	2014 Nations Cup	Stadionul Arcul de Triumf; Bucharest	
605	Andrei Ilie	(Center)	Jun 22, 2014	Emerging Ireland	2014 Nations Cup	Stadionul Arcul de Triumf; Bucharest	
606	Alexandru Oancea	(Hooker)	Jun 22, 2014	Emerging Ireland	2014 Nations Cup	Stadionul Arcul de Triumf; Bucharest	
607	Robert Neagu	Wing	Nov 8, 2014	United States	2014 end-of-year rugby union internationals	Stadionul Arcul de Triumf; Bucharest	
608	Grigoraș Diaconescu	(Flanker)	Feb 7, 2015	Portugal	2014–16 European Nations Cup First Division	Estádio Universitário de Lisboa; Lisbon	
609	Sabin Strătilă	Fullback	Mar 14, 2015	Germany	2014–16 European Nations Cup First Division	Fritz Grunebaum Stadium; Heidelberg	
610	Mihai Dico	(Prop)	Mar 14, 2015	Germany	2014–16 European Nations Cup First Division	Fritz Grunebaum Stadium; Heidelberg	
611	Jody Rose	(Fly-half)	Jun 12, 2015	Spain	2015 Nations Cup	Stadionul Arcul de Triumf; Bucharest	
612	Randall Morrison	Flanker	Jun 17, 2015	Namibia	2015 Nations Cup	Stadionul Arcul de Triumf; Bucharest	
613	Michael Wiringi	Fly-half	Jun 21, 2015	Argentina XV	2015 World Rugby Nations Cup	Stadionul Arcul de Triumf; Bucharest	
614	Alex Gordaș	(Prop)	Jun 21, 2015	Argentina XV	2015 World Rugby Nations Cup	Stadionul Arcul de Triumf; Bucharest	
615	Paula Kinikinilau	Center	Sep 5, 2015	Tonga	2015 Rugby World Cup warm-up matches	Stadionul Arcul de Triumf; Bucharest	
616	Johan van Heerden	Lock	Sep 5, 2015	Tonga	2015 Rugby World Cup warm-up matches	Stadionul Arcul de Triumf; Bucharest	
617	Tudorel Bratu	(Scrum-half)	Oct 11, 2015	Italy	2015 Rugby World Cup	Sandy Park; Exeter	
618	Stephen Shennan	Wing	Feb 6, 2016	Portugal	2014–16 European Nations Cup First Division	Cluj Arena; Cluj	
619	Ovidiu Melniciuc	(Center)	Feb 6, 2016	Portugal	2014–16 European Nations Cup First Division	Cluj Arena; Cluj	
620	Alexandru Pălii	(Scrum-half)	Feb 6, 2016	Portugal	2014–16 European Nations Cup First Division	Cluj Arena; Cluj	
621	Silviu Vasiliu	(Prop)	Feb 6, 2016	Portugal	2014–16 European Nations Cup First Division	Cluj Arena; Cluj	
622	Paul Rusu	Prop	Feb 13, 2016	Spain	2014–16 European Nations Cup First Division	Campo Universitaria; Madrid	
623	Marian Ispir	(Wing)	Mar 19, 2016	Georgia	2014–16 European Nations Cup First Division	National Stadium; Tbilisi	
624	Cosmin Manole	(Prop)	Mar 19, 2016	Georgia	2014–16 European Nations Cup First Division	National Stadium; Tbilisi	
625	Jack Umaga	Center	Jun 9, 2016	Namibia	2016 Nations Cup	Stadionul Arcul de Triumf; Bucharest	
626	Răzvan Ailenei	(Flanker)	Jun 9, 2016	Namibia	2016 Nations Cup	Stadionul Arcul de Triumf; Bucharest	
627	Ionuț Balaban	(Center)	Jun 9, 2016	Namibia	2016 Nations Cup	Stadionul Arcul de Triumf; Bucharest	
628	Andrei Iurea	(Lock)	Jun 9, 2016	Namibia	2016 Nations Cup	Stadionul Arcul de Triumf; Bucharest	
629	Gigi Militaru	(Prop)	Jun 9, 2016	Namibia	2016 Nations Cup	Stadionul Arcul de Triumf; Bucharest	
630	Nicolas Onuțu	(Wing)	Jun 9, 2016	Namibia	2016 Nations Cup	Stadionul Arcul de Triumf; Bucharest	
631	Dennis Perju	(Wing)	Jun 13, 2016	Uruguay	2016 Nations Cup	Stadionul Arcul de Triumf; Bucharest	
632	Florin Bărdașu	(Hooker)	Jun 18, 2016	Argentina XV	2016 Nations Cup	Stadionul Arcul de Triumf; Bucharest	
633	Fonovai Tangimana	Wing	Nov 12, 2016	United States	2016 end-of-year rugby union internationals	Stadionul Arcul de Triumf; Bucharest	
634	Vlăduț Popa	(Fullback)	Nov 12, 2016	United States	2016 end-of-year rugby union internationals	Stadionul Arcul de Triumf; Bucharest	
635	Cristi Chirică	(Flanker)	Nov 19, 2016	Canada	2016 end-of-year rugby union internationals	Stadionul Arcul de Triumf; Bucharest	
636	Lucian Mureșan	(Lock)	Nov 26, 2016	Uruguay	2016 end-of-year rugby union internationals	Stadionul Arcul de Triumf; Bucharest	
637	Alexandru Țiglă	(Scrum-half)	Nov 26, 2016	Uruguay	2016 end-of-year rugby union internationals	Stadionul Arcul de Triumf; Bucharest	
638	Luke Samoa	(Fly-half)	Feb 11, 2017	Germany	2019 Rugby World Cup Qualifier; 2017 Rugby Europe Championship	Sparda-Bank-Hessen-Stadion; Offenbach	
639	Sione Fakaʻosilea	Center	Mar 4, 2017	Russia	2019 Rugby World Cup Qualifier; 2017 Rugby Europe Championship	Central Stadium; Sochi	
640	Jack Cobden	Wing	Mar 11, 2017	Belgium	2019 Rugby World Cup Qualifier; 2017 Rugby Europe Championship	Le Stade du Petit Heysel; Brussels	
641	Marius Simionescu	(Wing)	Jun 17, 2017	Canada	2017 June rugby union tests	Ellerslie Rugby Park; Edmonton	
642	Ovidiu Cojocaru	(Hooker)	Jun 24, 2017	Brazil	2017 June rugby union tests	Stadionul Arcul de Triumf; Bucharest	
643	Adrian Moțoc	(Flanker)	Nov 25, 2017	Tonga	2017 end-of-year rugby union internationals	Stadionul Arcul de Triumf; Bucharest	
644	Kuselo Moyake	(No. 8)	Nov 25, 2017	Tonga	2017 end-of-year rugby union internationals	Stadionul Arcul de Triumf; Bucharest	
645	Răzvan Ilișescu	(No. 8)	Mar 10, 2018	Belgium	2019 Rugby World Cup Qualifier; 2018 Rugby Europe Championship	Stadionul Municipal; Buzău	
646	Dumani Mtya	Flanker	Mar 18, 2018	Georgia	2018 Rugby Europe Championship	National Stadium; Tbilisi	
647	Ionel Melinte	Fullback	Nov 10, 2018	Portugal	2018 Rugby Europe Championship – Relegation/Promotion Play-Off	Arena Zimbrilor; Baia Mare	
648	Daniel Plai	Fly-half	Nov 10, 2018	Portugal	2018 Rugby Europe Championship – Relegation/Promotion Play-Off	Arena Zimbrilor; Baia Mare	
649	Vlăduț Zaharia	Wing	Nov 10, 2018	Portugal	2018 Rugby Europe Championship – Relegation/Promotion Play-Off	Arena Zimbrilor; Baia Mare	
650	Tudor Boldor Boghita	(Wing)	Nov 17, 2018	United States	2018 end-of-year rugby union internationals	Stadionul Ghencea; Bucharest	
651	Marius Iftimiciuc	(Lock)	Nov 17, 2018	United States	2018 end-of-year rugby union internationals	Stadionul Ghencea; Bucharest	
652	Alexandru Savin	(Prop)	Nov 17, 2018	United States	2018 end-of-year rugby union internationals	Stadionul Ghencea; Bucharest	
653	Alexandru Bucur	(Wing)	Nov 24, 2018	Uruguay	2018 end-of-year rugby union internationals	Stadionul Ghencea; Bucharest	
654	Iulian Harțig	(Prop)	Mar 3, 2019	Spain	2019 Rugby Europe Championship	Campo Universitaria; Madrid	
655	Vasile Balan	(Prop)	Mar 17, 2019	Belgium	2019 Rugby Europe Championship	Le Stade du Petit Heysel; Brussels	
656	Vlad Neculau	(Lock)	Mar 17, 2019	Belgium	2019 Rugby Europe Championship	Le Stade du Petit Heysel; Brussels	
657	Taylor Gontineac	Centre	Jun 8, 2019	Chile	2019 June rugby union tests	Estadio Elías Figueroa Brander; Valparaíso	
658	Mihai Lamboiu	Wing	Jun 8, 2019	Chile	2019 June rugby union tests	Estadio Elías Figueroa Brander; Valparaíso	
659	Gabriel Rupanu	(Scrum-half)	Jun 8, 2019	Chile	2019 June rugby union tests	Estadio Elías Figueroa Brander; Valparaíso	
660	Dragoș Ser	Flanker	Feb 1, 2020	Georgia	2020 Rugby Europe Championship	National Stadium; Tbilisi	
661	Kamil Sobota	No. 8	Feb 8, 2020	Portugal	2020 Rugby Europe Championship	Complexo Desportivo da Caldas da Rainha; Caldas da Rainha	
662	Costel Burțilă	(Prop)	Feb 8, 2020	Portugal	2020 Rugby Europe Championship	Complexo Desportivo da Caldas da Rainha; Caldas da Rainha	
663	Moa Maliepo	(Wing)	Feb 22, 2020	Spain	2020 Rugby Europe Championship	Stadionul Municipal; Botoșani	
664	Paul Popoaia	(Centre)	Mar 13, 2021	Portugal		Lisbon	
665	Cristi Boboc	(Flanker)	Mar 20, 2021	Spain		Bucharest	
666	Florian Roșu	Lock	Jul 3, 2021	Argentina		Bucharest	
667	Damian Strătilă	Flanker	Nov 7, 2021	Uruguay		Verona	
668	Jason Tomane	Centre	Nov 7, 2021	Uruguay		Verona	
669	Hinckley Vaovasa	Centre	Nov 7, 2021	Uruguay		Verona	
670	Alexandru Alexe	(Flanker)	Nov 7, 2021	Uruguay		Verona	
671	Tudor Butnariu	(Hooker)	Nov 7, 2021	Uruguay		Verona	
672	Dorin Tica	(Prop)	Nov 7, 2021	Uruguay		Verona	
673	Bogdan Doroftei		Nov 20, 2021	Tonga		Bucharest	
674	Sioeli Lama		Nov 20, 2021	Tonga		Bucharest	
675	Andrei Toader		Nov 20, 2021	Tonga		Bucharest	
676	Victor Leon		Jul 1, 2022	Italy		Bucharest	
677	Gheorghe Gajion		Jul 10, 2022	Uruguay		Montevideo	
678	Ștefan Iancu		Jul 10, 2022	Uruguay		Montevideo	
679	Mihai Mureșan		Jul 17, 2022	Uruguay		Montevideo	
680	Gabriel Pop		Jul 17, 2022	Uruguay		Montevideo	
681	Atila Septar		Nov 4, 2022	Chile		Bucharest	
682	Alin Conache		Feb 4, 2023	Poland		Bucharest	
683	Thomas Crețu		Feb 4, 2023	Poland		Bucharest	
684	Robert Irimescu		Feb 4, 2023	Poland		Bucharest	
685	Andrei Mahu		Aug 5, 2023	United States		Bucharest	
686	Tevita Manumua		Aug 5, 2023	United States		Bucharest	
687	Taliaʻuli Sikuea		Aug 5, 2023	United States		Bucharest	
