= 1979 Romania rugby union tour of Wales =

Summary
P	W	D	L
Total
5	4	0	1
Test match
1	0	0	1
Opponent
P	W	D	L
Wales XV
1	0	0	1

The 1979 Romania rugby union tour of Wales was a series of five matches played by the Romania national rugby union team in Wales in September and October 1979. The Romanian team won four of their tour matches and lost the fifth, against a full-strength Welsh national side, by only a single point. Wales were the reigning Five Nations champions at the time although they designated their team Wales XV for the game and did not award full international caps.

== Matches ==
Scores and results list Romania's points tally first.

Opposing Team	For	Against	Date	Venue
Ebbw Vale	12	0	22 September	Eugene Cross Park, Ebbw Vale
Pontypridd	9	3	26 September	Sardis Road, Pontypridd
North Wales	38	15	29 September	Eirias Park, Colwyn Bay
West Wales	15	11	2 October	Stradey Park, Llanelli
Wales XV	12	13	6 October	National Stadium, Cardiff

== Touring party ==
- Manager: Viorel Morariu
- Assistant manager: Valeriu Irimescu
- Captain: Gheorghe Dumitru

=== Backs ===
- Alexandru Dumitru
- Marian Aldea
- Olimpiu Becheș
- Mihai Bucos
- Ion Constantin
- Mihai Holban
- Mircea Paraschiv
- Eduard Suciu
- Teodorin Tudose
- Ion Zafiescu

=== Forwards ===
- Pompiliu Borș
- Ion Bucan
- Gheorghe Caragea
- Nicolae Cioarec
- Constantin Dinu
- Gheorghe Dumitru
- Dan Florea
- Marin Ionescu
- Mircea Munteanu
- Florică Murariu
- Mircea Ortelecan
- Ion Pintea
- Corneliu Scarlat
- Enciu Stoica
