= Dumitru Popescu-Colibași =

Romanian handball coach (1912–1993)

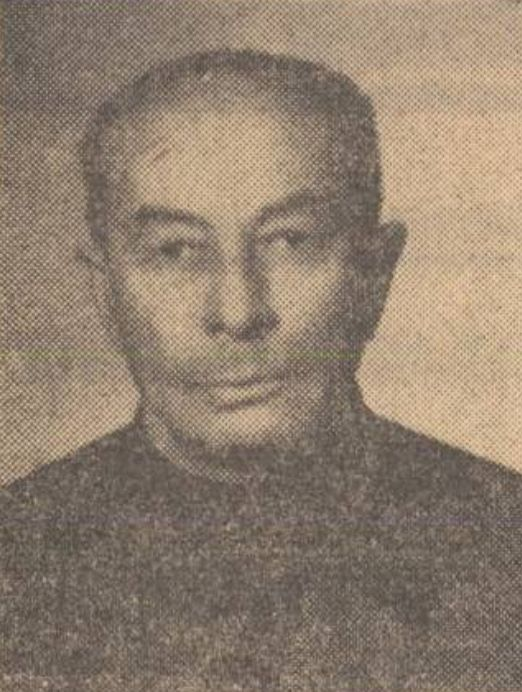

Personal information
- Full name: Olimpiu-Dumitru Popescu-Colibași
- Nationality: Romanian
- Born: 16 March 1912 Afumați, Romania
- Died: 2 March 1993 (aged 80) Brașov, Romania

Sport
- Sport: Handball

Teams managed
- –: Progresul Brașov
- –: Tractorul Brașov
- –: Rulmentul Brașov

Olimpiu-Dumitru Popescu-Colibași (16 March 1912 – 2 March 1993), nicknamed Tata Pik, was a Romanian handball manager, rugby union player and author of books on sports. He had pioneered handball in the city of Brașov. Popescu-Colibași graduated from the A.N.E.F. in 1937. He helped develop many leading handball players during decades: including Anna Stark, Maria Scheip, Mara Windt, Gerlinde Reip, Edeltraut Franz-Sauer, Iuliana Nako, and Rodica Floroianu.

As a rugby player, he won the national championship with TCR. In 1934, Popescu-Colibași and the Romania national rugby team appeared against Italy. He was a starter.

Other honours followed his death: he is the namesake of the multi-purpose, 1,700-seat Dumitru Popescu Colibași Sports Hall in Brașov.

== Biography ==
His father Stan Popescu, a school teacher, was the son of poor peasant farmers from Colibași commune. He had been killed in 1916 during World War I. Popescu-Colibași was raised by his grandfather in Dudești. His mother worked as a civil servant at the court of cassation in Bucharest. Popescu-Colibași attended the high school in the Romanian capital living in the family of Mihail Sadoveanu with whom he was a relative. He married Ivonna Demetrian in 1944, an employee of the Romanian Radio Broadcasting Company.

== Achievements ==
=== Handball 11s ===
Progresul Brașov

- Liga Națională:
  - Winner: 1956
  - Silver Medalist: 1954
  - Bronze Medalist: 1955, 1957

=== Handball 7s ===
Tractorul Brașov

- Liga Națională:
  - Bronze Medalist: 1959, 1962

== See also ==
- List of Romania national rugby union players
