= 1980 Romania rugby union tour of Ireland =

Summary
| P | W | D | L |
Total
| 6 | 3 | 2 | 1 |
Test match
| 1 | 0 | 1 | 0 |
Opponent
| P | W | D | L |
Ireland XV
| 1 | 0 | 1 | 0 |

The 1980 Romania rugby union tour of Ireland was a series of six matches played by the Romania national rugby union team in Ireland and England in October 1980. The tour was essentially a visit to Ireland, with a single match against Leicester (to celebrate that club's centenary) being played in England. Romania won four of their six matches, lost one and drew the other. The draw came in the international match against Ireland, which the home team did not consider a full international match. This was rated a major result for Romania, who were hopeful at the time of joining the Five Nations Championship, and the Rothmans Rugby Yearbook's review of the tour stated that "any lingering doubts about the ability of the Romanians to pose a challenge to the home countries were dispelled".

== Matches ==
Scores and results list Romania's points tally first.

| Opposing Team | Result | For | Against | Date | Venue |
|---|---|---|---|---|---|
| Munster | Won | 32 | 9 | 4 October | Limerick |
| Leinster | Lost | 10 | 24 | 8 October | Dublin |
| Ulster | Won | 15 | 13 | 11 October | Belfast |
| Connacht | Won | 28 | 9 | 14 October | Galway |
| IRELAND XV | Drew | 13 | 13 | 18 October | Lansdowne Road, Dublin |
| Leicester | Won | 39 | 7 | 22 October | Welford Road, Leicester |

== Touring party ==
- Manager: Theodor Rădulescu
- Assistant Managers: Valeriu Irimescu
- Captain: Mircea Paraschiv

=== Backs ===
- Teodorin Tudose
- Laurentiu Codoi
- Sorin Fuicu
- Gheorghe Vărzaru
- Marian Aldea
- Ion Constantin
- Adrian Lungu
- Dumitru Alexandru
- Mircea Paraschiv
- Eduard Suciu

=== Forwards ===
- Marian Zafiescu
- Alexandru Radulescu
- Florică Murariu
- Enciu Stoica
- Gheorghe Dumitru
- Pompiliu Borș
- Gheorghe Caragea
- Marin Ionescu
- Gheorghe Daraban
- Ion Bucan
- Vasile Turlea
- Constantin Dinu
- Mircea Munteanu
- Mircea Ortelecan
- Corneliu Gheorghe

== Sources ==
- Vivian Jenkins, ed. (1981). Rothmans Rugby Yearbook 1981–82. Rothmans Publications Ltd. pp. 60–63. ISBN 090757405X.
