= 1971–72 FIRA Nations Cup =

European rugby union championship

1971-72 Nations Cup
- Date: 11 December 1971- 21 May 1972
- Countries: Czechoslovakia; France; Morocco; Romania

Tournament statistics
- Champions: France
- Matches played: 6

The Nations Cup 1971-72 was the 12th edition of a European rugby union championship for national teams, and seventh with the formula and the name of "Nations Cup".

The tournament was won by France, who swept all their matches.

== First division ==
- Table

| Place | Nation | Games | | | | Points | | | Table points |
| Place | Nation | played | won | drawn | lost | for | against | difference | Table points |
|---|---|---|---|---|---|---|---|---|---|
| 1 | France | 3 | 3 | 0 | 0 | 171 | 18 | 153 | 9 |
| 2 | Romania | 3 | 2 | 0 | 1 | 92 | 40 | 52 | 7 |
| 3 | Morocco | 3 | 1 | 0 | 2 | 30 | 133 | -103 | 5 |
| 4 | Czechoslovakia | 3 | 0 | 0 | 3 | 9 | 111 | -102 | 3 |

Czechoslovakia relegated to division 2

- Results

Point system: try 3 pt, conversion: 2 pt., penalty kick 3 pt. drop 3 pt, goal from mark 3 pt.
Click "show" for more info about match (scorers, line-up etc).

| 11 December 1971 | France | 31 - 12 | Romania | Parc Sauclères, Beziers |
| | Try: Cantoni, Dourthe; Dubertrand, Maso; Con: Villepreux 3 Pen: Villepreux 3 | | Pen: Irimescu; Drop: Durbac, Nicolescu |
France15.Pierre Villepreux, 14.André Dubertrand, 13.Claude Dourthe, 12.Jo Maso, 11.Jack Cantoni, 10.Jean-Louis Bérot, 9.Richard Astre, 8.Yvan Buonomo, 7.Victor Boffelli, 6.Olivier Saïsset, 5.Benoît Dauga (cap.), 4.Claude Spanghero, 3.Jean-Louis Martin, 2.René Bénésis, 1.Armand Vaquerin
Romania:15.Radu Durbac, 14.Radu Ionescue, 13.Valeriu Irimescu, 12.Gheorghie Nica, 11.Mihai Suciu, 10.Mihai Nicolescu, 9.Vasile Tata, 8.Ion Tutuianu, 7.Gheorgie Rascanu (cap.), 6.Paul Ciobanel, 5.Alexandru Atanasiu, 4.Constantin Serban, 3.Constantin Dinu, 2.Valeriu Iorgulescu, 1.Nicolae Baciu

- Historical note: Valeriu Irimescu score, almost surely, the last goal from mark scored in an International match.

30 January 1972

| Morocco | 3 - 72 | France XV |

Casablanca

22 April 1972

| France XV | 68 - 3 | Czechoslovakia |

Colmar

27 April 1972

| Czechoslovakia | 3 - 21 | Morocco |

Millau

2 May 1972

| Romania | 58 - 6 | Morocco |

Bucharest

21 May 1972

| Czechoslovakia | 3 - 22 | Romania |

Vyškov

== Second Division ==
Point system: try 3 pt, conversion: 2 pt., penalty kick 3 pt. drop 3 pt, goal from mark 3 pt.
Click "show" for more info about match (scorers, line-up etc)

- Semifinals

20 February 1972

| Italy | 0 - 0 | Portugal |

Stadio Plebiscito, Padua

2 April 1972

| Portugal | 7 - 15 | Italy |

Lisbon

- Aggregate; Italy 15 - Portugal 7

5 December 1971

| Spain | 26 - 4 | Yugoslavia |

Estadio Nacional Complutense, Madrid

30 April 1972

| Yugoslavia | 7 - 21 | Spain |

Split

- Aggregate; Spain 47 - Yugoslavia 11
- Final

14 May 1972

| Spain | 10 - 0 | Italy |

Estadio Nacional Complutense, Madrid

21 May 1972

| Italy | 6 - 6 | Spain |

Stadio Gino Pistoni, Ivrea

- Aggregate; Spain 16 - Italy 6
- Spain promoted to division 1

== Bibliography ==
- (in Italian) Francesco Volpe, Valerio Vecchiarelli (2000), 2000 Italia in Meta, Storia della nazionale italiana di rugby dagli albori al Sei Nazioni, GS Editore (2000) ISBN 88-87374-40-6
- (in Italian) Francesco Volpe, Paolo Pacitti (Author), Rugby 2000, GTE Gruppo Editorale (1999).
