= 1975 Romania rugby union tour of New Zealand =

Summary
P	W	D	L
Total
8	4	1	3

The 1975 Romania rugby union tour of New Zealand was a series of matches played between August and September 1975 by the Romania national rugby union team in New Zealand.

It was the second tour overseas of a Romanian team after the tour to Argentina in 1973.

No official tests were played. The climax of the tour was the drawn match against the Junior All Blacks.

== Results ==
Scores and results list Romania's points tally first.

Opposing Team	For	Against	Date	Venue	Status
Poverty Bay	19	12	6 August 1975	Rugby Park, Gisborne	Tour match
Waikato	14	9	9 August 1975	Rugby Park, Waikato	Tour match
Manawatu	9	28	13 August 1975	Showgrounds, Palmerston North	Tour match
North Auckland	0	3	16 August 1975	Okara Park, Whangārei	Tour match
Marlborough	21	6	20 August 1975	Lansdowne Park, Blenhiem	Test match
Southland	12	9	23 August 1975	Rugby Park, Invercargill	Tour match
South Canterbury	4	12	27 August 1975	Fraser Park, Timaru	Tour match
(New Zealand) Junior All Blacks	10	10	30 August 1975	Athletic Park, Wellington	Tour match
