= Andrei Iurea =

Romania international rugby union player (born 1996)

- Full name: Andrei Iurea
- Born: 1 December 1996 (age 29) Târgu Frumos, Romania
- Height: 1.94 m (6 ft 4 1/2 in)
- Weight: 110 kg (17 st 5 lb; 240 lb)

Rugby union career
- Position(s): Lock, flanker
- Current team: Știința Baia Mare
Youth career
- 2011–13: C.F.R. Pașcani
- 2013–14: Clubul Sportiv Școlar Bârlad
- 2014–16: Clubul Sportiv Cleopatra Mamaia
Senior career
Years	Team	Apps	(Points)
2016–2019	Știința Baia Mare	19	(5)
- Correct as of 14 March 2020
International career
Years	Team	Apps	(Points)
2016	Romania	1	(0)
- Correct as of 14 March 2020

Andrei Iurea (born 1 December 1996) is a Romanian former rugby union player. He most recently played as a lock for professional SuperLiga club Știința Baia Mare. He could also play as a flanker.

== Club career ==
Andrei Iurea started playing rugby as a youth for a local Romanian club based in Pașcani, C.F.R. Pașcani, under the guidance of coach Nicolae Tarcan. After two years he moved to another local school based team, Clubul Sportiv Școlar Bârlad, playing there for a year. Starting with 2014 he played for two seasons for Clubul Sportiv Cleopatra Mamaia. In 2016 he was signed by SuperLiga side, Știința Baia Mare, form where he announced his retirement from the sport in October 2019.

== International career ==
Iurea was also selected for Romania's national team, the Oaks, making his international debut at the 2016 World Rugby Nations Cup in a match against the Welwitschias.
