= Dennis Perju =

Romania international rugby union player

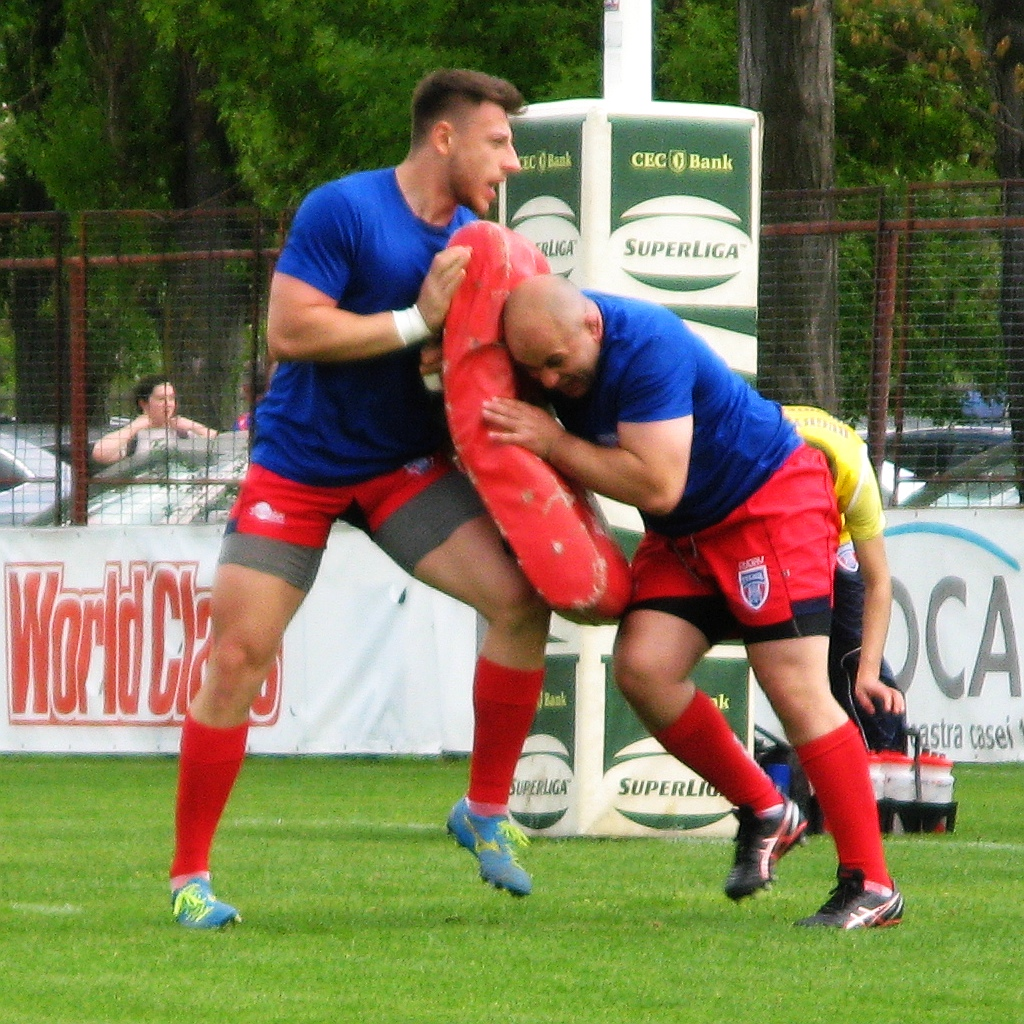
- Dennis Perju (standing) training with Steaua in 2017
- Full name: Dennis-Alexandru Perju
- Born: 20 October 1994 (age 32) Bacău, Romania
- Height: 1.90 m (6 ft 3 in)
- Weight: 106 kg (16 st 10 lb; 234 lb)

Rugby union career
- Position(s): Centre, wing
- Current team: Steaua
Senior career
Years	Team	Apps	(Points)
2008–2015	CUS Torino Rugby	?	(?)
2015–2016	L'Aquila	14	(0)
2016–	Steaua București	8	(5)
- Correct as of 23 September 2017
International career
Years	Team	Apps	(Points)
2016–	Romania	1	(0)
- Correct as of 23 September 2017

Dennis-Alexandru Perju (born 20 October 1994) is a Romanian rugby union football player. He plays mostly as a centre for professional SuperLiga club Steaua București but can also play as a wing. He also plays for Romania's national team, the Oaks, making his international debut during Matchday 2 of the 2016 World Rugby Nations Cup in a match against Los Teros.

== Career ==
Before joining Steaua București, Dennis Perju played for L'Aquila and for CUS Torino Rugby in Italy.
