= Alexandru Pălii =

- Born: Alexandru Neculai Pălii; 25 February 1995 (age 31)
- Height: 1.80 m (5 ft 11 in)
- Weight: 85 kg (187 lb)

Rugby union career
- Position: Scrum-half
Provincial / State sides
| Years | Team | Apps | (Points) |
| 2014– | Baia Mare | 6 | (0) |
- Correct as of 5 December 2015
International career
| Years | Team | Apps | (Points) |
| 2016– | Romania | 1 | (0) |
- Correct as of 6 February 2016

Alexandru Neculai Pălii (born 25 February 1995) is a Romanian rugby union player. He plays in the scrum-half position for amateur SuperLiga club Baia Mare. He also plays for Romania's national team the Oaks.
