= 1973 Romania rugby union tour of Argentina =

Summary
P	W	D	L
Total
6	1	1	4
Test match
6	0	0	2
Opponent
P	W	D	L
Argentina
2	0	0	2

The 1973 Romania rugby union tour of Argentina was a series of matches played between August and September 1973 by Romania national rugby union team in Argentina. The "Pumas" won both test matches against the European side.

Romania, then one of the best teams in Europe outside the Five Nations Championship, was called by Union Argentina de Rugby after the refusal of Rugby Football Union to send, as planned, the English national team, worried by political situation in Argentina, after the return of Juan Perón and the Ezeiza massacre.

== Results ==
29 August 1973

San Isidro Club	10–19	Romania XV
Try: Walther 2 Con: Cutler		Try: Teleasa, Durbac; Con: Florescu; Pen: Durbac 2, Florescu,

Ferrocarrill Oeste, Buenos Aires
Referee: Florencio Varela (Buenos Aires)

San Isidro Club: Arturo Rodríguez Jurado; Mario Walther, Félix Cirio, Roberto Matarazzo, Julio Otaola; Fernando González Victorica, Miguel Cutler; Miguel Iglesias (capt.), Roberto Lucke, Jorge Carracedo; Antonio Díaz Manini, Jaime Rodríguez Jurado; Fernando Insúa, Osvaldo Rocha, Ismael Alcácer.
Romania: Radu Durbac; Ion Constantin, Petre Motrescu, Gheorghe Nica, Dumitru Teleasa; Mihai Nicolescu, Petre Florescu (capt.); Enciu Stoica, Gheorghe Daraban, Constantin Fugigi; Nicolae Postolache, Alexander Atanasiu; Mihai Ciornei, Valeriu Iorguescu, Nicolae Baciu.

1 September 1973

Buenos Aires	10–10	Romania XV
Try: Pérez Leirós, 2 Pen: Morgan		Try: Durbac; Pen: Nica; Drop: Nica,

Ferrocarrill Oeste, Buenos Aires
Referee: Ricardo J.Colombo (Buenos Aires)

Buenos Aires: Martin Alonso; Mario Walther, Eduardo Morgan (capt.), Adolfo Capelletti, Guillermo Pérez Leirós; Andrés Brown, Ricardo Rinaldi; Ernesto Miguens, Raúl Sanz, Miguel Iglesias; Rubén Castro, Carlos Bottarini; Martín Giargia, Guillermo Casas, Oscar Carbone.
Romania: Radu Durbac; Ion Constantin, Petre Motrescu, Gheorghe Nica, Dumitru Teleasa; Mihai Nicolescu, Petre Florescu (capt.); Constantin Fugigi, Nicolae Postolache, Alexandru Atanasiu; Gheorghe Dumitru, Gheorghe Darraban; Mircea Ciornel, F.Popovici, Constantin Dinu.

5 September 1973

Interior	16–10	Romania XV
Try: Brandi, Pasaglia; Con: Viders; Pen: Viders 2		Try: Durbac, Constantín; Con: Durbac

Atletc Club, Córdoba
Referee: Bruno Bertelli (Buenos Aires).

Combinado del Interior: J.Viders; M.Brandi, O.Terranova, R.Tarquini, C.Dora; C.Navesi, L.Chacón; L.Lavesi, Miguel Chesta (capt.), J.Nazasi; Juan Mangiamelli, Ricardo Passaglia; Roberto Fariello, José Costante, A.Furno.
Romania: Radu Durbac; Ion Constantin, Andrei Hariton, Gheorghe Nica, Dumitru Teleasa; Mihai Nicolescu, Petre Florescu (capt.); Constantin Fugigi, Florin Constantin, Alexandru Atanasiu; Gheorghe Dumitru, N.Postolache; Nicolae Baciu, Valeriu Iorgulescu, Constantin Dinu.

8 September 1973

Argentina	15–9	Romania
Try: Dumas; Con: Porta; Pen: Porta 3.		Pen: Florescu, Durbac; Drop: Nicolescu

Ferrocarrill Oeste, Buenos Aires
Referee: Florencio Varela (Buenos Aires)

Argentina			Romania
Martin Alonso	FB	15	FB	Radu Durbac
Eduardo Morgan	W	14	W	Ion Constantin
Alejandro Travaglini	C	13	C	Andrei Hariton
Roberto Matarazzo	C	12	C	Petre Motrescu
Alejandro Altberg	W	11	W	Gheorghe Nica
Hugo Porta	FH	10	FH	Mihai Nicolescu
Luis Gradín	SH	9	SH	Petre Florescu (c)
Jorge Wittman	N8	8	N8	Constantin Fugigi
Jorge Carracedo	F	7	F	Florin Constantin
Hugo Miguens(capt.)	F	6	F	Alexandru Atanasiu
José Javier Fernandez	L	5	L	Gheorghe Dumitru
José Virasoro	L	4	L	Gheorghe Daraban
Fernando Insúa	P	3	P	Mircea Ciornei
Juan Dumas	H	2	H	Valeriu Iorgulescu
Mario Carluccio	P	1	P	Constantin Dinu
		Replacements
			W	Dumitru Teleasa
			P	Nicolae Baciu
			FB	Nicu Duta
			P	Nicolae Baciu

12 September 1973

Rosario	7–6	Romania XV
Try: A.Rodríguez; Pen: A.Rodríguez		Pen: Nica2

Rosario
Referee: César de Elizalde (Buenos Aires).

Rosario: Arturo Rodriguez Jurado; C.García (capt.), R.Rodríguez, C.Blanco, A.Knight; Javier Escalante, R.Castañeda; V.Macat, R.Covella, E.Mainini; M.Senatore, G.Todeschini; A.Risler, José Costante, P.Sandionigi.
Romania: Nicu Duta; Dumitru Teleasa, Gheorghe Nica (capt.), Andrei Hariton e Ion Constantin; Radu Durbac, Vasile Tata; Constantin Fugigi, Florin Constantin, Alexandru Atanasiu; Gheorghe Daraban, Gheorghe Dumitru; Mircea Ciornei, Valeriu Iorgulescu, Constantin Dinu.

15 September 1973

Argentina	24–3	Romania
Try: Rodríguez Jurado 2, Matarazzo, Alonso; Con: Porta; Pen: Porta; Drop: Porta		Drop: N.Duta

Ferrocarrill Oeste, Buenos Aires
Referee: Bruno J.Bertelli

Argentina			Romania
Martin Alonso	FB		FB	Radu Durbac
Eduardo Morgan	W		W	Ion Constantin
Arturo Rodriguez Jurado	C		C	Andrei Hariton (red card)
Roberto Matarazzo	C		C	Petre Motrescu
Alejandro Altberg	W		W	Gheorghie Nica
Hugo Porta	FH		FH	Mihai Nicolescu
Luis Gradín	SH		SH	Petre Florescu
Jorge Carracedo	N8		N8	Enciu Stoica
Hugo Miguens (capt.)	F		F	Florin Constantin
Miguel Iglesias	F		F	Alexandru Atanasiu
José Javier Fernandez	L		L	Gheorghie Dumitru
José Virasoro	L		L	Gheorghie Daraban
Fernando Insúa	P		P	Mircea Ciornei
Juan Dumas	H		H	Valeriu Iorgulescu
Mario Carluccio	P		P	Constantin Dinu
		Replacements
			W	Dumitru Teleasa
			F	Constantin Fugigi
			FB	Nicu Duta
			P	Nicolae Baciu
