= Stadionul Arcul de Triumf (1914) =

Multi-purpose stadium in Bucharest, Romania

Coordinates: 44°28′08″N 26°04′30″E

Stadionul Naţional Arcul de Triumf
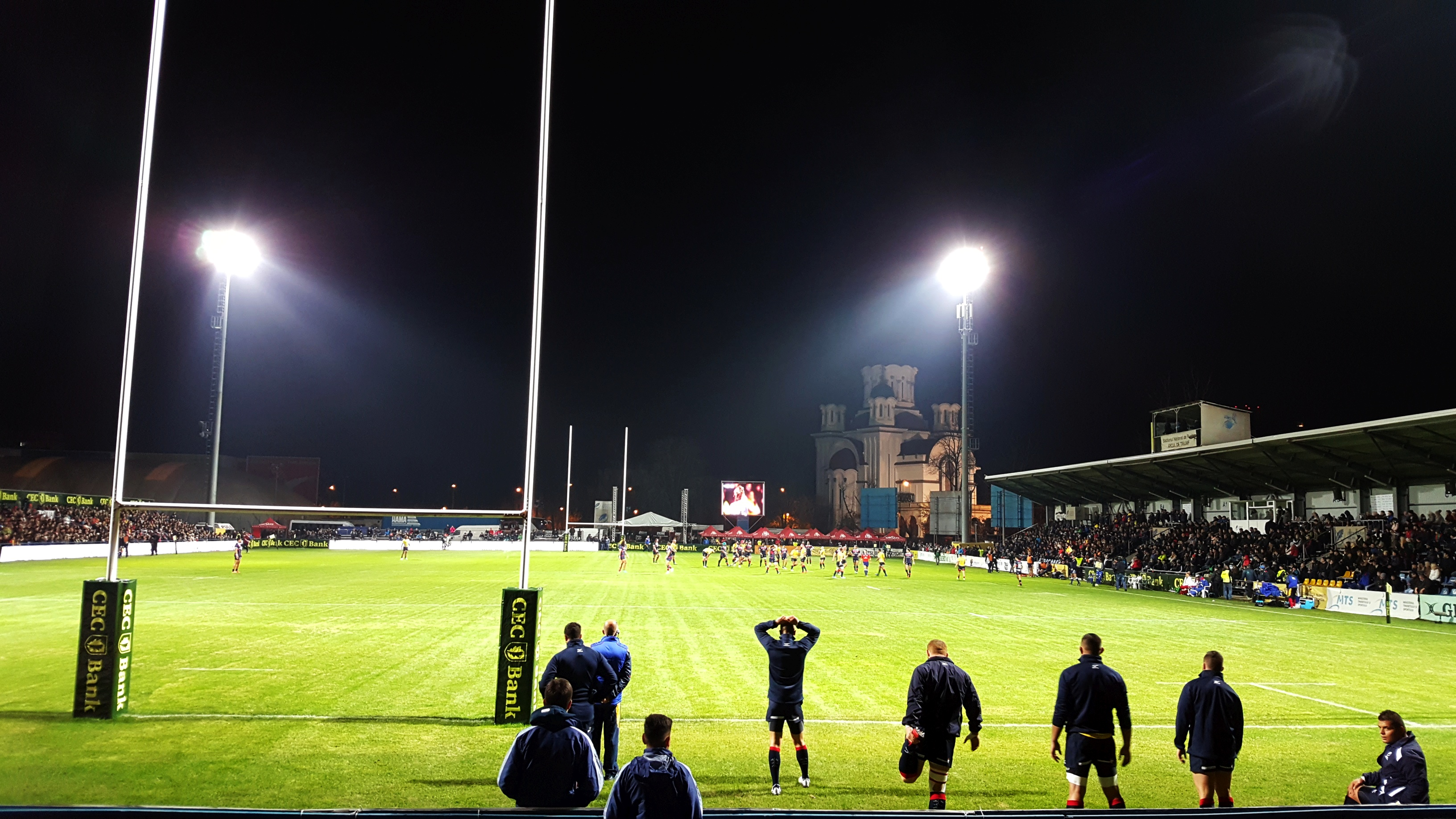
- Interactive map of Stadionul Naţional Arcul de Triumf
- Former names: Stadionul Tineretului
- Location: Bucharest, Romania
- Operator: Romanian Rugby Federation
- Capacity: 7,500
- Surface: Grass

Construction
- Built: 1913–1914
- Opened: 1914
- Renovated: 2008–2013
- Expanded: 2008–2013
- Demolished: 2018

Tenants
- Romania national rugby union team București Wolves; IRB Nations Cup

Stadionul Naţional de Rugby Arcul de Triumf (Triumphal Arch National Rugby Stadium) was a multi-purpose stadium in Bucharest, Romania. It was used mostly for rugby games and named after the triumphal arch in Bucharest.

The stadium was demolished in 2018 and was replaced with the new Stadionul Arcul de Triumf.

The stadium was steeped in Romanian rugby history. It was located on the former site of the Federaţiei playing fields, where the sport was introduced to the country in the early 20th century.

Between 2008 and 2013, the stadium was renovated and expanded to 7,500 seats with the help of Sector's 1 City Hall.

== Music ==
=== Concerts ===
Year	Artist
2007	(England) Muse
2008	(Canada) Leonard Cohen
2010	(Italy) Eros Ramazzotti
2010	(Republic of Ireland) The Cranberries
2010	(England) Eric Clapton
