= Marcel Mihalache =

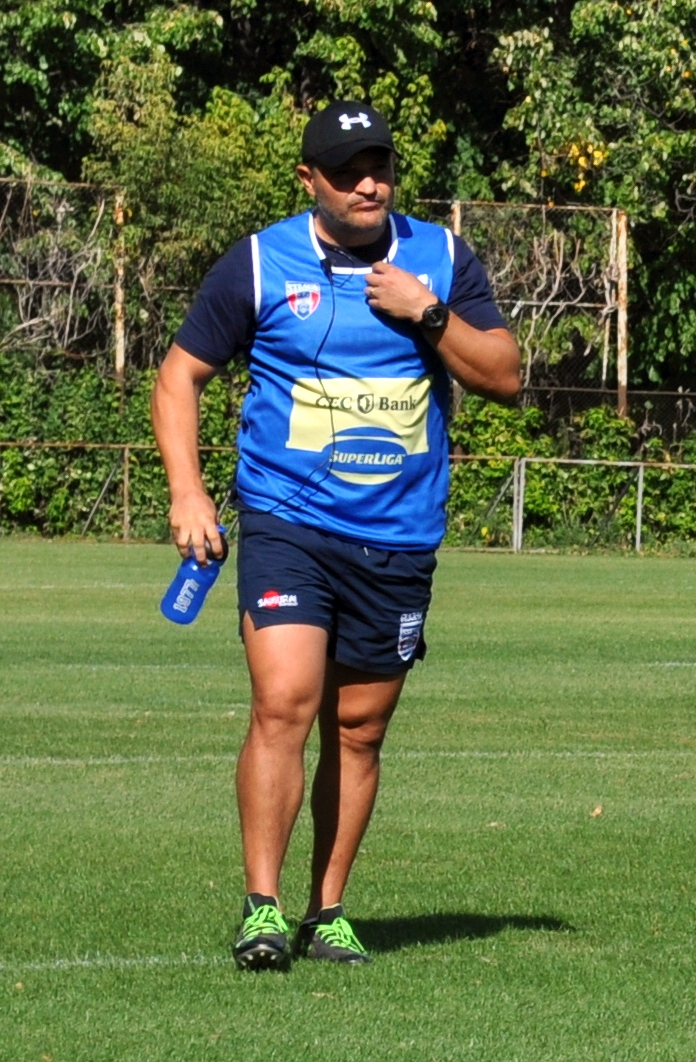
- Marcel Mihalache as assistant coach for Steaua in 2017
- Full name: Marcel Laurențiu Mihalache
- Born: 26 August 1971 (age 55) Romania
- Height: 1.80 m (5 ft 11 in)
- Weight: 101 kg (15 st 13 lb; 223 lb)

Rugby union career
- Position: Hooker
- Current team: Steaua
Senior career
Years	Team	Apps	(Points)
1994–2012	Steaua București		
- Correct as of 17 October 2017
International career
Years	Team	Apps	(Points)
2007–2008	Romania	4	(0)
- Correct as of 17 October 2017

Marcel Mihalache (born 26 August 1971) is a retired Romanian rugby union football player. He played as a hooker for professional SuperLiga club Steaua București. Mihalache is currently the assistant coach of Steaua.

== Career ==
Marcel Mihalache played his entire career for Steaua București and is considered one of the club's living legends.

== Honours ==
Steaua București

- SuperLiga: 1998/99, 2002/03, 2004/05, 2005/06
- Romanian Cup: 2006, 2007
