= 1968–69 FIRA Nations Cup =

European rugby union championship

1968–69 Nations Cup
- Date: 27 October 1968 – 26 May 1969
- Countries: Czechoslovakia; France; West Germany; Poland; Romania

Tournament statistics
- Champions: Romania
- Matches played: 9

The Nations Cup 1968–69 was the ninth edition of a European rugby union championship for national teams, and fourth with the formula and the name of "Nations Cup".

The tournament was won for the first time by Romania, who won all their four games, including a 15–14 win over France at home.

== First division ==
- Table

Place	Nation	Games				Points			Table points
Place	Nation	played	won	drawn	lost	for	against	difference	Table points
1	Romania	4	4	0	0	79	37	42	12
2	France	4	3	0	1	135	35	100	9
3	Czechoslovakia	4	2	0	2	66	71	−5	7
4	West Germany	3	0	0	3	20	44	−24	3
5	Poland	3	0	0	3	19	132	−113	3

Poland and Germany relegated to division 2

- Results

Point system: try 3 pt, conversion: 2 pt., penalty kick 3 pt. drop 3 pt, goal from mark 3 pt.
Click "show" for more info about match (scorers, line-up etc)

Poland-Germany not played

27 October 1968

Czechoslovakia XV	9 – 18	Romania

Říčany

1 December 1968	Romania	15 – 14	France	Bucharest
	Pen: Irimescu 4 Drop: Irimescu		Try: Bonal; Con: Pariès; Pen: Pariès 3	Referee: Joseph (Wales)
Romania : 15 V. Daiciulescu, 14 Mihai Suciu, 11 Dan Coravu, 13 M. Wusek, 12 Valeriu Irimescu, 10 .Dragomirescu-Rahtopol, 9 Petre Florescu, 8 R. Demian (c), 7 Gh. Rascanu, 6 P. Ciobanel, 5 Ion Tutuianu, 4 Constantin Serban, 3 C. Dinu, 2 V.Iorgulescu, 1 G. Stoica, sostituti:, 16 Nicolae Baciu				Referee: Joseph (Wales)
France: 15 Henri Magois, 14 Jean-Marie Bonal, 11 Jean Sillières, 13 Jo Maso, 12 André Ruiz, 10 Lucien Pariès, 9 Marcel Puget, 8 Walter Spanghero, 7 Christian Carrère (c), 6 B. Dutin, 5 Elie Cester, 4 Benoît Dauga, 3 J.M. Esponda, 2 Michel Yachvili, 1 J.C. Noble

5 April 1969

West Germany	6 – 20	France XV

Cologne

27 April 1969

France XV	34 – 14	Czechoslovakia

Besançon

15 June 1969

Romania	40 – 11	Poland

Bucharest

25 August 1969

Czechoslovakia	25 – 8	Poland

Havířov

26 October 1969

West Germany	11 – 18	Czechoslovakia

Hamburg

9 November 1969

West Germany	3 – 6	Romania

Konylisy, Hanover

1969

Poland	0 – 67	France XV

Warsaw

== Second division ==
=== Pool 1 ===
- Table

Place	Nation	Games				Points			Table points
Place	Nation	played	won	drawn	lost	for	against	difference	Table points
1	Italy	2	2	0	0	39	3	+36	6
2	Yugoslavia	2	1	0	1	25	28	−3	4
3	Bulgaria	2	0	0	2	6	39	−33	2

- Results

Point system: try 3 pt, conversion: 2 pt., penalty kick 3 pt. drop 3 pt, goal from mark 3 pt.
Click "show" for more info about match (scorers, line-up etc)

29 December 1968	Italy	22 – 3	Yugoslavia	San Donà
	Try: Autore, Gini, Rista; U. Conforto, Pignotti; Bollesan; Con: R. Martini 2		Try: Kesvic	Referee: Genet (France)

2 March 1969	Bulgaria	0 – 17	Italy	Sofia
			Try: Pignotti, Ambron; Cioni 2 Con: Pacifici; Pen: Di Zitti	Attendance: Sckvor (Czechoslovakia); Referee: Sckvor

1 May 1969

Yugoslavia	22 – 6	Bulgaria

Pančevo

=== Pool 2 ===
- Table

Place	Nation	Games				Points			Table points
Place	Nation	played	won	drawn	lost	for	against	difference	Table points
1	Spain	2	2	0	0	33	11	+22	6
2	Portugal	2	1	0	1	26	21	+5	4
3	Morocco	2	0	0	2	6	33	−27	2

- Results

Point system: try 3 pt, conversion: 2 pt., penalty kick 3 pt. drop 3 pt, goal from mark 3 pt.

23 March 1969

Portugal	11 – 15	Spain

Barreiro

13 April 1969

Spain	18 – 0	Morocco

Estadio Nacional Complutense, Madrid

20 April 1969

Morocco	6 – 15	Portugal

Casablanca

=== Pool 3 ===
- Table

Place	Nation	Games				Points			Table points
Place	Nation	played	won	drawn	lost	for	against	difference	Table points
1	Belgium	1	1	0	0	9	5	+4	3
2	Netherlands	1	0	0	1	5	9	−4	1

- Results

Point system: try 3 pt, conversion: 2 pt., penalty kick 3 pt. drop 3 pt, goal from mark 3 pt.

30 March 1969

Belgium	9 – 5	Netherlands

Nivelles

=== Final Pool ===
- Table

Place	Nation	Games				Points			Table points
Place	Nation	played	won	drawn	lost	for	against	difference	Table points
1	Italy	2	2	0	0	42	5	37	6
2	Spain	2	1	0	1	46	15	31	4
3	Belgium	2	0	0	2	3	71	−68	2

Italy promoted to division 1

- Results

Point system: try 3 pt, conversion: 2 pt., penalty kick 3 pt. drop 3 pt, goal from mark 3 pt.
Click "show" for more info about match (scorers, line-up etc)

4 May 1969	Italy	12 – 5	Spain	Stadio Tommaso Fattori, L'Aquila
	Try: Pacifici; Pen: Di Zitti; Drop: Pacifici, Ricci		Try: Modrego; Con: Fonfo
Spain: 15.Del Valle, 14.Abecia, 13.Del rRey, 12.Curujo, 11.Matutano, 10.Fonto (63' Maturola), 9.Fonfo, 7.Gomez-Reino, 8.Bueno, 6.Mocoroa, 5.Caltazar, 4.Irarorza, 3.Espalza, 2.Hacha, 1.Modrego

10 May 1969	Belgium	0 – 30	Italy	Brussels
Belgium : 15.Sluys, 14.Michel, 13.Vachandex, 12.Van Krinktiwelt II, 11.Donnez, 10.Brunet, 9.Antoine, 1.Van Krinktiwelt I, 2.Stalmans, 3.Vanderberghe, 4.Maillon, 5.Lefevre, 6.Pirodde, 7.Jacquemin, 8.Van Severen
Italy: 15.Angelo Autore, 14.Elio Michelon, 13.Vittorio Ambron, 12.Fernando Pignotti, 11.Walter Rista, 10.Giampiero Ricci, 9.Umberto Conforto, 7.Franco Cioni, 8.Marco Bollesan, 6.Lucio Boccaletto, 5.Luigi Bettella, 4.Antonio di Zitti (cap), 3.Dominico Armellin, 2.Alessandro Brunelli, 1.Massimo Gini

17 May 1969

Spain	41 – 3	Belgium

Estadio Nacional Complutense, Madrid

== Bibliography ==
- (in Italian) Francesco Volpe, Valerio Vecchiarelli (2000), 2000 Italia in Meta, Storia della nazionale italiana di rugby dagli albori al Sei Nazioni, GS Editore (2000) ISBN 88-87374-40-6
- (in Italian) Francesco Volpe, Paolo Pacitti (Author), Rugby 2000, GTE Gruppo Editorale (1999).
