= Ovidiu Melniciuc =

Romanian rugby union player (born 1994)

- Born: 16 January 1994 (age 32)
- Height: 1.78 m (5 ft 10 in)
- Weight: 83 kg (13 st 1 lb; 183 lb)

Rugby union career
- Position: Fly-half
Provincial / State sides
Years	Team	Apps	(Points)
2013–	Universitatea Cluj	36	(211)
- Correct as of 5 December 2015
International career
Years	Team	Apps	(Points)
2016–	Romania	3	(0)
- Correct as of 25 October 2016

Ovidiu Melniciuc (born 16 January 1994) is a Romanian rugby union player. He plays in the fly-half position for the amateur SuperLiga club Cluj. He also plays for Romania's national team, the "Oaks".
