= 1991 Romania rugby union tour of New Zealand =

Summary
P	W	D	L
Total
8	5	0	3
Test match
1	0	0	1
Opponent
P	W	D	L
New Zealand U21
1	0	0	1

The 1991 Romania rugby union tour of New Zealand was a series of matches played between May and June 1991 in New Zealand by Romania national rugby union team to prepare the 1991 Rugby World Cup.

== Results ==
Scores and results list Romania's points tally first.

Opposing Team	For	Against	Date	Venue	Status
Wanganui	26	18	15 May 1991	Wanganui	Tour match
Horowhenua	48	12	18 May 1991	Levin	Tour match
Waiparapa Bush	25	32	22 May 1991	Masterton	Tour match
Hawke's Bay	17	24	25 May 1991	Napier	Tour match
King Country	28	6	29 May 1991	Taumarunui	Tour match
Counties Manukau	30	17	2 June 1991	Pukekohe	Tour match
Thames Valley	30	7	5 June 1991	Paeroa	Tour match
New Zealand XV	30	60	9 June 1991	Eden Park, Auckland	Test match
