= 2019 mid-year rugby union internationals =

The 2019 mid-year rugby union internationals (also known as the summer internationals in the Northern Hemisphere) are international rugby union matches that are mostly played in the Southern Hemisphere during the June international window.

The matches are part of World Rugby's global rugby calendar (2012–2019) that includes test matches between touring Northern Hemisphere nations and home Southern Hemisphere nations. In addition, the global calendar gives Tier 2 nations the opportunity to play Tier 1 nations outside the November International Window, increasing competitiveness from the Tier 2 sides ahead of the 2019 Rugby World Cup in Japan.

== Fixtures ==
=== 8 June ===
8 June 2019

Brazil	16–22	Spain

Estádio Municipal Prefeito José Liberatti, Osasco
Referee: Juan Pablo Federico (Argentina)

8 June 2019

Chile	11–27	Romania

Estadio Elías Figueroa Brander, Valparaíso
Referee: Henrique Platais (Brazil)

=== 15 June ===
15 June 2019

Chile	22–29	Spain

Estadio La Granja, Curicó
Referee: Santiago Romero (Uruguay)

15 June 2019

Brazil	21–22	Romania

Estádio Jayme Cintra, Jundiaí
Referee: Damian Schneider (Argentina)

== See also ==
- 2019 World Rugby Pacific Nations Cup
- 2019 Rugby World Cup warm-up matches
