= 1998 Romania rugby union tour of Argentina =

Summary
P	W	D	L
Total
5	1	2	2
Test match
1	0	0	1
Opponent
P	W	D	L
Argentina
1	0	0	1

The 1998 Romania rugby union tour of Argentina was a series of matches played in July and August 1998 by Romania national rugby union team.

== Results ==
Scores and results list Romania's points tally first.

Opposing Team	For	Against	Date	Venue	Status
Selection de Ascenso	34	34	25 July 1998	Bahia Blanca	Tour match
Córdoba	27	23	1 August 1999	Córdoba	Tour match
Tucumán	29	38	5 August 1998	Tucuman	Tour match
Rosario	16	16	28 August 1998	Rosario	Tour match
Argentina	22	68	8 August 1998	Rosario	Test match
