= Olimpiu Becheș =

Romanian rugby union player (born 1955)

Olimpiu Becheș (born 28 September 1955) is a Romanian former rugby player from Noul Săsesc, Sibiu. He played as a centre.

He played 6 matches for Romania, from 1979 to 1983, scoring a try, 4 points in aggregate.
