= Stadio Tommaso Fattori =

Football stadium in L'Aquila, Italy

Coordinates: 42°21′23″N 13°24′14″E

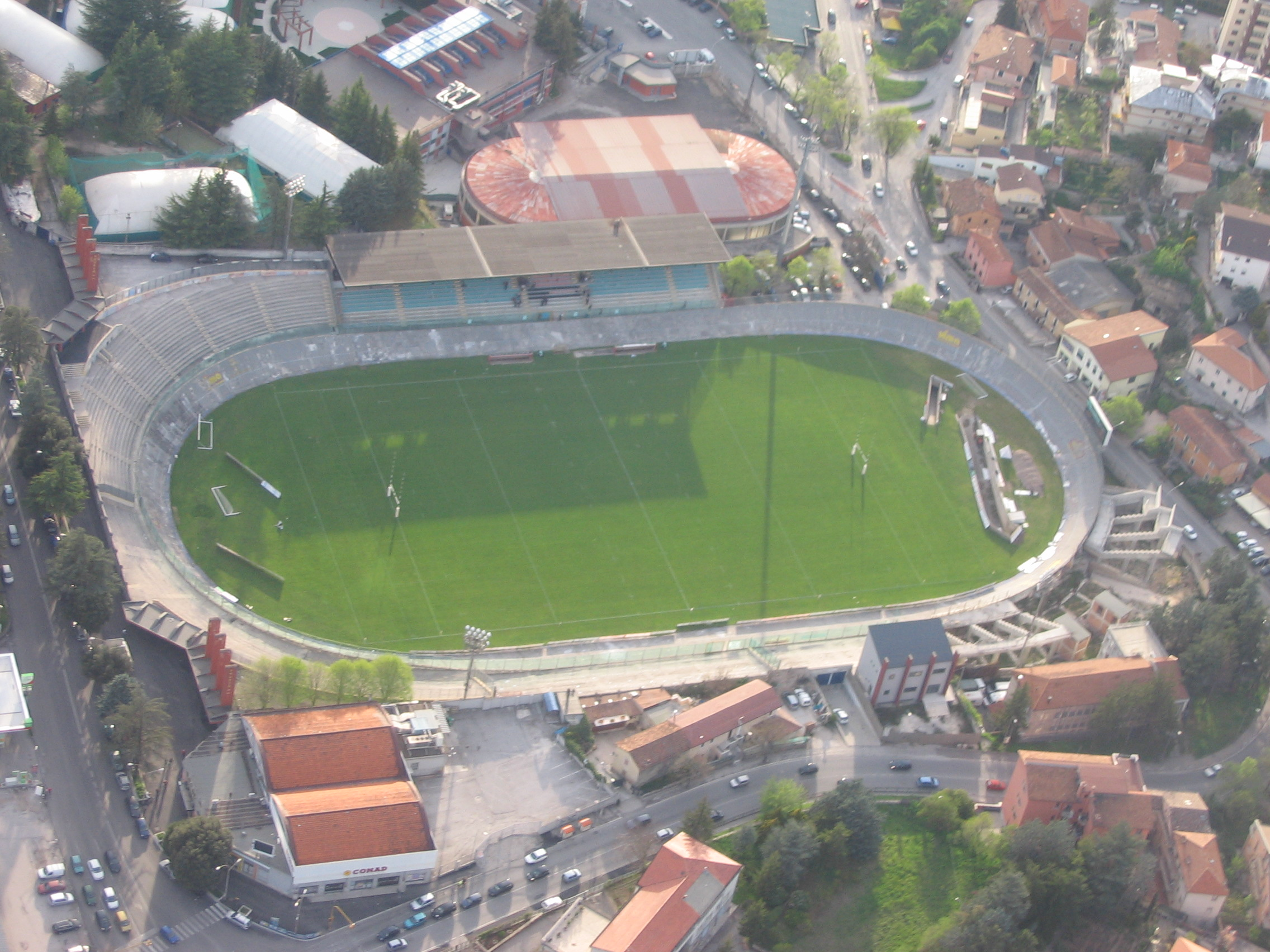
- Interactive map of Stadio Tommaso Fattori
- Former names: XXVII Ottobre
- Location: L'Aquila, Italy
- Owner: Municipality of L'Aquila
- Capacity: 10,000
- Surface: Grass; 105m x 68m

Construction
- Groundbreaking: 1929
- Opened: 1933
- Architect: Paolo Vietti-Violi

Tenants
- L'Aquila Calcio; L'Aquila Rugby

Stadio Tommaso Fattori is a multi-use stadium in L'Aquila, Italy. It is currently used mostly for football and rugby union matches and the home of L'Aquila Calcio and L'Aquila Rugby. Inaugurated in 1933, the stadium holds 10,000 people. It hosted some of the football preliminaries for the 1960 Summer Olympics.

== See also ==
- List of rugby league stadiums by capacity
- List of rugby union stadiums by capacity
