= 2016 World Rugby Nations Cup =

Tournament details
- Countries: Argentina XV; Emerging Italy; Namibia; Romania; Spain; Uruguay
- Tournament format(s): Round-robin
- Date: 9 – 18 June 2016

Tournament statistics
- Teams: 4
- Matches played: 6

Final
- Champions: Romania (4th title)
- Runners-up: Argentina XV

The 2016 World Rugby Cup of Nations was the eleventh edition of the World Rugby Nations Cup rugby union tournament, created by World Rugby (formerly IRB). As with the previous nine tournaments, the competition took place in the Stadionul Naţional de Rugby in Bucharest, Romania.

Due to Georgia's tour of the Pacific Islands in June, the World Rugby Tbilisi Cup did not take place. Instead, this tournament featured six teams split in two pools of three, where the three European teams played the other three teams. This format was last used in 2012. Hosts Romania won the title, for the fourth time in five years. Romania finished with 13 points after beating the Argentina XV in the decisive match.

== Teams ==
- Argentina XV
- Emerging Italy
- Namibia
- Romania
- Spain
- Uruguay

== Standings ==
=== Pool A ===
	Team	Games				Points			Tries		Bonus points	Points
	Team	Played	Won	Drawn	Lost	For	Against	Difference	For	Against	Bonus points	Points
1	Argentina XV	3	2	0	1	92	58	+34	12	7	2	10
2	Namibia	3	2	0	1	80	78	+2	10	9	2	10
3	Uruguay	3	1	0	2	40	66	-26	5	8	1	5
Source : worldrugby.org Points breakdown: *4 points for a win *2 points for a draw *1 bonus point for a loss by seven points or less *1 bonus point for scoring four or more tries in a match

=== Pool B ===
	Team	Games				Points			Tries		Bonus points	Points
	Team	Played	Won	Drawn	Lost	For	Against	Difference	For	Against	Bonus points	Points
1	Romania	3	3	0	0	80	16	+64	9	2	1	13
2	Emerging Italy	3	1	0	2	82	102	-20	10	13	1	5
3	Spain	3	0	0	3	40	94	-54	5	12	2	2
Source : worldrugby.org Points breakdown: *4 points for a win *2 points for a draw *1 bonus point for a loss by seven points or less *1 bonus point for scoring four or more tries in a match

== Fixtures ==
=== Matchday 1 ===
9 June 2016
16:00 EET (UTC+02)

Argentina XV	44 - 8	Spain
	Report

9 June 2016
18:00 EET (UTC+02)

Uruguay	24 - 26	Emerging Italy
	Report

9 June 2016
20:00 EET (UTC+02)

Namibia	8-20	Romania
	Report

=== Matchday 2 ===
13 June 2016
16:00 EET (UTC+02)

Argentina XV	40-30	Emerging Italy
	Report

13 June 2016
18:00 EET (UTC+02)

Namibia	34-32	Spain
	Report

13 June 2016
20:00 EET (UTC+02)

Uruguay	0-40	Romania
	Report

=== Week 3 (place games) ===
18 June 2016
16:00 EET (UTC+02)

Uruguay	16-0	Spain
	Report

18 June 2016
18:00 EET (UTC+02)

Namibia	38-26	Emerging Italy
	Report

18 June 2016
20:00 EET (UTC+02)

Argentina XV	8-20	Romania
	Report

== See also ==
- World Rugby Tbilisi Cup
- World Rugby Nations Cup
