= Constantin Dinu =

Romanian rugby union player (1945–2022)

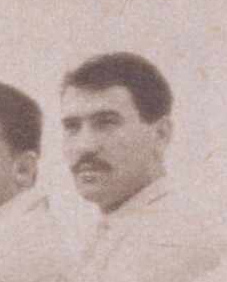
- Dinu with Grivița București in 1966
- Born: 29 April 1945 Bucharest, Romania
- Died: 14 December 2022 (aged 77) Chitila, Romania

Rugby union career
- Position: Prop
Youth career
- 1960–1964: Grivița București
Senior career
Years	Team	Apps	(Points)
1964–1968	Grivița București	?	(?)
1968–1973	Știința Petroșani	?	(?)
1973–1983	Grivița București	?	(?)
1983–1984	Reggio Calabria	?	(?)
1984–1987	RO Cholet	?	(?)
International career
Years	Team	Apps	(Points)
1965–1983	Romania	69	(0)
Coaching career
- Years: Team
- 1983–1984: Reggio Calabria (player-coach)
- 1984–1987: RO Cholet (player-coach)
- 1987–1990: Stade Nantais
- 1990–1996: AS Police Paris

Constantin Dinu (29 April 1945 – 14 December 2022) was a Romanian rugby union player who played as a prop.

== Trophies ==
=== Club ===
- Winner of the Liga Națională de Rugby (1966, 1967)
- Winner of the Cupa României (1982)

=== International ===
- Winner of the 1968–69 FIRA Nations Cup
- Winner of the FIRA Trophy (1975, 1977, 1981, 1983)
