= 1987 Rugby World Cup Pool 4 =

Pool 4 of the 1987 Rugby World Cup began on 23 May and was completed on 2 June. The pool was composed of France, Scotland, Romania and Zimbabwe.

== Standings ==
Team	Pld	W	D	L	PF	PA	PD	T	Pts	Qualification
France	3	2	1	0	145	44	+101	25	5 (Note: France qualify as pool winner having scored three tries to Scotland's two in their drawn match.)	Knockout stage
Scotland	3	2	1	0	135	69	+66	22	5	Knockout stage
Romania	3	1	0	2	61	130	−69	6	2	
Zimbabwe	3	0	0	3	53	151	−98	5	0	

== Romania vs Zimbabwe ==
23 May 1987

Romania	21–20	Zimbabwe
Try: Paraschiv; Toader; Hodorcă; Pen: A. Dumitru (3)		Try: Tsimba (2); Neill; Con: Ferreira; Pen: Ferreira (2)

Eden Park, Auckland
Attendance: 4,500
Referee: Stephen Hilditch (Ireland)

Romania	Zimbabwe

FB	15	Marcel Toader
RW	14	Alexandru Marin	(substituted off) 5'
OC	13	Vasile David
IC	12	Ștefan Tofan
LW	11	Adrian Lungu
FH	10	Alexandru Dumitru	(substituted off) 60'
SH	9	Mircea Paraschiv (c)
N8	8	Cristian Răducanu
OF	7	Florică Murariu
BF	6	Haralambie Dumitraș
RL	5	Ștefan Constantin
LL	4	Laurențiu Constantin
TP	3	Gheorghe Leonte
HK	2	Emilian Grigore
LP	1	Ion Bucan
Replacements:
WG	16	Liviu Hodorcă	(substituted in) 5'
N8	17	Emilian Necula
FB	18	Vasile Ion	(substituted in) 60'
LK	19	Gheorghe Dumitru
PR	20	Vasile Pașcu
HK	21	Vasile Ilcă
Coach:
(Romania) Mihai Naca

FB	15	Andy Ferreira
RW	14	Peter Kaulback
OC	13	Richard Tsimba	(substituted off) 60'
IC	12	Campbell Graham
LW	11	Eric Barrett
FH	10	Craig Brown
SH	9	Malcolm Jellicoe (c)
N8	8	Mark Neill
OF	7	Dirk Buitendag
BF	6	Rod Gray
RL	5	Michael Martin
LL	4	Malcolm Sawyer
TP	3	Andy Tucker
HK	2	Lance Bray
LP	1	George Elcombe
Replacements:
CE	16	Andre Buitendag	(substituted in) 60'
WG	17	Shawn Graham
FH	18	Marthinus Grobler
FL	19	Errol Bredenkamp
PR	20	Jumbo Davidson
HK	21	Keith Bell
Coach:
(Zimbabwe) Brian Murphy

== France vs Scotland ==
23 May 1987

France	20–20	Scotland
Try: Sella; Berbizier; Blanco; Con: Blanco; Pen: Blanco (2)		Try: White; Duncan; Pen: Hastings (4)

Lancaster Park, Christchurch
Attendance: 18,000
Referee: Fred Howard (England)

France	Scotland

FB	15	Serge Blanco
RW	14	Patrice Lagisquet
OC	13	Philippe Sella
IC	12	Denis Charvet
LW	11	Patrick Estève
FH	10	Franck Mesnel
SH	9	Pierre Berbizier
N8	8	Laurent Rodriguez
OF	7	Dominique Erbani
BF	6	Eric Champ
RL	5	Jean Condom
LL	4	Alain Lorieux
TP	3	Jean-Pierre Garuet-Lempirou
HK	2	Daniel Dubroca (c)
LP	1	Pascal Ondarts
Replacements:
HK	16	Philippe Dintrans
PR	17	Louis Armary
FL	18	Alain Carminati
SH	19	Rodolphe Modin
WG	20	Marc Andrieu
FH	21	Didier Camberabero
Coach:
(France) Jacques Fouroux

FB	15	Gavin Hastings
RW	14	Matt Duncan
OC	13	Keith Robertson
IC	12	Douglas Wyllie
LW	11	Iwan Tukalo
FH	10	John Rutherford	(substituted off) 7'
SH	9	Roy Laidlaw
N8	8	Iain Paxton
OF	7	Finlay Calder
BF	6	John Jeffrey
RL	5	Alan Tomes
LL	4	Derek White
TP	3	Iain Milne
HK	2	Colin Deans (c)
LP	1	David Sole
Replacements:
FB	16	Peter Dods
CE	17	Alan Tait	(substituted in) 7'
SH	18	Greig Oliver
LK	19	Jeremy Campbell-Lamerton
PR	20	Alex Brewster
HK	21	Gary Callander
Coach:
(Scotland) Derrick Grant

== France vs Romania ==
28 May 1987

France	55–12	Romania
Try: Lagisquet (2); Charvet (2); Sella; Andrieu; Camberabero; Erbani; Laporte; Con: Laporte (8); Pen: Laporte		Pen: Bezuscu (4)

Athletic Park, Wellington
Attendance: 7,000
Referee: Bob Fordham (Australia)

France	Romania

FB	15	Serge Blanco	(substituted off) 14'
RW	14	Patrice Lagisquet
OC	13	Philippe Sella
IC	12	Denis Charvet
LW	11	Marc Andrieu
FH	10	Guy Laporte
SH	9	Pierre Berbizier
N8	8	Dominique Erbani
OF	7	Alain Carminati
BF	6	Eric Champ
RL	5	Jean Condom
LL	4	Francis Haget
TP	3	Louis Armary
HK	2	Philippe Dintrans (c)
LP	1	Jean-Pierre Garuet-Lempirou
Replacements:
HK	16	Daniel Dubroca
PR	17	Pascal Ondarts
FL	18	Laurent Rodriguez
SH	19	Rodolphe Modin
WG	20	Patrick Estève
FB	21	Didier Camberabero	(substituted in) 14'
Coach:
(France) Jacques Fouroux

FB	15	Vasile Ion
RW	14	Marcel Toader
OC	13	Vasile David
IC	12	Ștefan Tofan
LW	11	Adrian Lungu
FH	10	Romeo Bezuscu
SH	9	Mircea Paraschiv (c)
N8	8	Cristian Răducanu
OF	7	Gheorghe Dumitru
BF	6	Emilian Necula
RL	5	Ștefan Constantin
LL	4	Laurențiu Constantin
TP	3	Vasile Pașcu
HK	2	Vasile Ilcă	(substituted off) 12'
LP	1	Florea Opriș
Replacements:
WG	16	Liviu Hodorcă
N8	17	Florică Murariu
WG	18	Adrian Pllotschi
LK	19	Haralambie Dumitraș
PR	20	Gheorghe Leonte
HK	21	Emilian Grigore	(substituted in) 12'
Coach:
(Romania) Mihai Naca

== Scotland vs Zimbabwe ==
30 May 1987

Scotland	60–21	Zimbabwe
Try: Tait (2); Tukalo (2); Duncan (2); Paxton (2); Oliver; Hastings; Jeffrey; Con: Hastings (8)		Try: Buitendag; Con: Grobler; Pen: Grobler (5)

Athletic Park, Wellington
Attendance: 12,000
Referee: David Burnett (Ireland)

Scotland	Zimbabwe

FB	15	Gavin Hastings
RW	14	Matt Duncan
OC	13	Alan Tait
IC	12	Keith Robertson
LW	11	Iwan Tukalo
FH	10	Douglas Wyllie
SH	9	Greig Oliver
N8	8	Iain Paxton
OF	7	Finlay Calder
BF	6	John Jeffrey
RL	5	Alan Tomes
LL	4	Derek White
TP	3	Iain Milne
HK	2	Colin Deans (c)
LP	1	David Sole
Replacements:
HK	16	Gary Callander
PR	17	Alex Brewster	(substituted in) 7'
FL	18	Derek Turnbull
FH	20	Richard Cramb
FB	21	Gary Callander
Coach:
(Scotland) Derrick Grant

FB	15	Andy Ferreira
RW	14	Shawn Graham
OC	13	Andre Buitendag
IC	12	Campbell Graham
LW	11	Eric Barrett
FH	10	Marthinus Grobler
SH	9	Malcolm Jellicoe (c)
N8	8	Mark Neill
OF	7	Dirk Buitendag
BF	6	Rod Gray
RL	5	Michael Martin
LL	4	Malcolm Sawyer
TP	3	Andy Tucker
HK	2	Lance Bray
LP	1	Alex Nicholls
Replacements:
WG	16	Peter Kaulback
FH	17	Craig Brown
LK	18	Neville Kloppers
HK	19	Keith Bell
Coach:
(Zimbabwe) Brian Murphy

== Romania vs Scotland ==
2 June 1987

Romania	28–55	Scotland
Try: Murariu (2); Toader; Con: A. Dumitru; Ion; Pen: A. Dumitru (3); Ion		Try: Jeffrey (3); Tait (2); Hastings (2); Duncan; Tukalo; Con: Hastings (8); Pen: Hastings

Carisbrook, Dunedin
Attendance: 14,000
Referee: Stephen Hilditch (Ireland)

Romania	Scotland

FB	15	Vasile Ion
RW	14	Alexandru Marin	(substituted off) 5'
OC	13	Adrian Lungu
IC	12	Adrian Pllotschi
LW	11	Marcel Toader
FH	10	Alexandru Dumitru
SH	9	Mircea Paraschiv (c)
N8	8	Cristian Răducanu	(substituted off) 20'
OF	7	Florică Murariu
BF	6	Haralambie Dumitraș
RL	5	Ștefan Constantin
LL	4	Laurențiu Constantin
TP	3	Gheorghe Leonte
HK	2	Emilian Grigore
LP	1	Ion Bucan
Replacements:
FH	16	Romeo Bezușcu
CE	17	Vasile David
FB	18	Nicolae Vereș
PR	19'	Vasile Pașcu
LK	20	Gheorghe Dumitru	(substituted in) 20'
PR	21	Florea Opriș
Coach:
(Romania) Mihai Naca

FB	15	Gavin Hastings
RW	14	Matt Duncan
OC	13	Alan Tait
IC	12	Scott Hastings	(substituted off) 1'
LW	11	Iwan Tukalo
FH	10	Douglas Wyllie
SH	9	Roy Laidlaw
N8	8	Iain Paxton
OF	7	Finlay Calder
BF	6	John Jeffrey
RL	5	Alan Tomes	(substituted off) 42'
LL	4	Derek White
TP	3	Norrie Rowan
HK	2	Colin Deans (c)
LP	1	David Sole
Replacements:
HK	16	Gary Callander
PR	17	Alex Brewster
LK	18	Jeremy Campbell-Lamerton	(substituted in) 42'
FL	20	Richard Cramb	(substituted in) 1'
FB	21	Peter Dods
Coach:
(Scotland) Derrick Grant

== France vs Zimbabwe ==
2 June 1987

France	70–12	Zimbabwe
Try: Modin (3); Camberabero (3); Charvet (2); Rodriguez (2); Dubroca; Estève; Laporte; Con: Camberabero (9)		Try: Kaulback; Con: Grobler; Pen: Grobler (2)

Eden Park, Auckland
Attendance: 3,000
Referee: Derek Bevan (Wales)

France	Zimbabwe

FB	15	Didier Camberabero
RW	14	Marc Andrieu
OC	13	Eric Bonneval	(substituted off) 20'
IC	12	Denis Charvet
LW	11	Patrick Estève
FH	10	Franck Mesnel	(substituted off) 75'
SH	9	Rodolphe Modin
N8	8	Laurent Rodriguez
OF	7	Jean-Luc Joinel
BF	6	Eric Champ
RL	5	Jean Condom
LL	4	Alain Lorieux
TP	3	Pascal Ondarts
HK	2	Daniel Dubroca (c)
LP	1	Jean-Louis Tolot
Replacements:
PR	16	Philippe Dintrans
PR	17	Jean-Pierre Garuet-Lempirou
N8	18	Dominique Erbani
SH	19	Pierre Berbizier
WG	20	Philippe Sella
FH	21	Guy Laporte	(substituted in) 75'
Coach:
(France) Jacques Fouroux

FB	15	Andy Ferreira
RW	14	Pete Kaulback
OC	13	Richard Tsimba
IC	12	Campbell Graham
LW	11	Eric Barrett
FH	10	Marthinus Grobler
SH	9	Malcolm Jellicoe (c)
N8	8	Mark Neill
OF	7	Dirk Buitendag
BF	6	Rod Gray
RL	5	Michael Martin	(substituted off) 37'
LL	4	Malcolm Sawyer
TP	3	Andy Tucker
HK	2	Lance Bray
LP	1	George Elcombe	(substituted off) 27'
Replacements:
FH	16	Craig Brown
WG	17	Shawn Graham
FH	18	Errol Bredenkamp
LK	19	Neville Kloppers	(substituted in) 37'
PR	20	Alex Nicholls	(substituted in) 27'
HK	21	Keith Bell
Coach:
(Zimbabwe) Brian Murphy
