= 1983–84 FIRA Trophy =

European rugby union championship

1983-84 FIRA Trophy
- Date: 30 October 1983 – 27 May 1984
- Countries: France; Italy; Morocco; Poland; Romania; Soviet Union

Tournament statistics
- Champions: France
- Grand Slam: France
- Matches played: 15

The 1983–84 FIRA Trophy was the 24th edition of a European rugby union championship for national teams.

The tournament was won by France, with a Grand Slam. Romania, Italy and Soviet Union finished in the following places, with the same points. The French only awarded caps in their win over Romania (25-15). Poland and Morocco finished in the 5th and 6th places and were relegated.

Spain and Tunisia won the Second division pools and were promoted for the following season.

== First division ==
Place	Nation	Games				Points			Table points
Place	Nation	played	won	drawn	lost	for	against	difference	Table points
1	France	5	5	0	0	159	47	+112	15
2	Romania	5	3	0	2	71	40	+31	11
3	Italy	5	3	0	2	62	60	+2	11
4	Soviet Union	5	3	0	2	67	70	-3	11
5	Poland	4	1	0	3	13	78	-65	6
6	Morocco	4	0	0	4	25	102	-77	4

- Morocco and Poland relegated to division 2

Point system: try 4 pt, conversion: 2 pt., penalty kick 3 pt. drop 3 pt
Click "show" for more info about match (scorers, line-up etc.)

30 October 1983

Romania	31 - 0	Poland
Try: Murariu, Radulescu, Aldea, Caragea; Con: Dumitru (3); Pen: Dumitru; Drop: Dinu

Dinamo Stadion, Bucharest
Referee: (Italy) N. Camaduro

30 October 1983

Soviet Union	16 - 7	Italy
Try: Mironov, Parshin, Feshenko; Con: Gonyani (2)		Try: Zanon; Pen: Torresan

Spartak Stadium, Kiev
Referee: (France) Bressy

20 November 1983

Romania	19 - 3	Soviet Union
Try: Ion; Pen: Ion, Podarescu (2); Drop: Podarescu		Pen: Gonyani

Dinamo Stadion, Bucharest
Attendance: 3,000
Referee: (France) J.-C- Doucet

4 December 1983	France	25 - 15	Romania	Stade Ernest-Wallon, Toulouse
	Try: Estève, Gallion, Lagisquet, Lescarboura; Con: Lescarboura (2); Pen: Lescarboura; Drop: Lescarboura		Try: Radulescu; Con: Podarescu; Pen: Podarescu	Attendance: 6,800; Referee: (England) R. Quittenton
France: 15.Serge Gabernet, 14.Patrice Lagisquet, 13.Philippe Sella, 12.Didier Codorniou, 11.Patrick Estève, 10.Jean-Patrick Lescarboura, 9.Jérôme Gallion, 8.Jean-Luc Joinel, 7.Dominique Erbani, 6.Jean-Pierre Rives (cap.), 5.Alain Lorieux, 4.Jean Condom, 3.Jean-Pierre Garuet-Lempirou, 2.Philippe Dintrans, 1.Michel Crémaschi				Attendance: 6,800; Referee: (England) R. Quittenton
Romania: 15.Vasile Ion, 14.Marian Aldea, 13.Adrian Lungu, 12.Mihai Marghescu, 11.Gheorghie Varzaru, 10.Stelian Podarescu, 9.Mircea Paraschiv (cap.), 8.Stefan Constantin, 7.Alexandru Radulescu, 6.Florica Murariu, 5.Gheorghie Caragea, 4.Gheorghie Dumitru, 3.Vasile Pascu, 2.Mircea Munteanu, 1.Ion Bucan - replacements: 16.D. Balan, 17.Laurentiu Constantin

19 February 1984

France A1	38 - 16	Italy
Try: Camberabero, Carpentier (2), Caussade, Janik, Martinez; Con: Camberabero (4); Pen: Camberabero (2)		Try: Azzali, Ghizzoni; Con: Bettarello; Pen: Bettarello (2)

Stade Léo-Lagrange, Chalon-sur-Saône
Referee: (England) John Trigg

4 March 1984

France A1	45-10	Morocco

Stade Jean-Antoine Moueix, Libourne

18 March 1984

Italy	27 - 0	Morocco
Try: Zanon, Ghizzoni, Screnci; Con: Bettarello (3); Pen: Bettarello (3)

Stadio Leonardo Garilli, Piacenza
Referee: (France) Matheu

8 April 1984

Romania	6 – 0 withdraw	Morocco

22 April 1984	Italy	12 - 6	Romania	Stadio Fattori, L'Aquila
	Pen: Bettarello (3); Drop: Bettarello		Pen: Alexandru; Drop: Podarescu	Referee: Derek Bevan (Wales)
Italy: 15.Serafino Ghizzoni, 14.Alberto Osti, 13.Rino Francescato (cap.), 12.Luigi de Joanni, 11.Andrea Azzali, 10.Stefano Bettarello, 9.Alessandro Ghini, 8.Claudio Tinari, 7.Gianni Zanon, 6.Sabatino Pace, 5.Mauro Gardin, 4.Antonio Colella, 3.Stefano Romagnoli, 2.Giorgio Morelli, 1.Giancarlo Pivetta - replacements: 16.Mariano Crescenzo				Referee: Derek Bevan (Wales)
Romania: 15.Liviu Hodorca, 14.Sorin Fuicu, 13.Adrian Lungu, 12.C. Capmare, 11.Marian Aldea, 10.Dumitru Alexandru, 9.Mircea Paraschiv, 8.Alexandru Radulescu, 7.Pompiliu Bors, 6.Florica Murariu, 5.Laurentiu Constantin, 4.Gheorghie Dumitru, 3.Vasile Pascu, 2.Mircea Munteanu, 1.Ion Bucan - replacements: 16.Stelian Podarescu, 17.Haralambie Dumitras

29 April 1984

Morocco	6 - 7	Poland

Rabat

6 May 1984

Morocco	9 - 23	Soviet Union

Olimpic Centre, Rabat

16 May 1984

Poland	3 - 19	France A1

Warsaw

20 May 1984

Soviet Union	3 - 32	France A1

Fili Stadium, Moscow
Attendance: 4,500

27 May 1984

Poland	3 - 22	Soviet Union

Warsaw

1984

Italy	6 – 0 withdraw	Poland

== Second division ==
=== Pool A ===
Place	Nation	Games				Points			Table points
Place	Nation	played	won	drawn	lost	for	against	difference	Table points
1	Spain	4	3	1	0	103	28	+75	11
2	Portugal	4	3	1	0	79	21	+58	11
3	Belgium	4	1	1	2	49	39	+10	7
4	Netherlands	4	1	1	2	43	62	-19	7
5	Denmark	4	0	0	4	28	152	-124	4

- Spain promoted to division 1

5 November 1983

Netherlands	6 - 6	Belgium

19 November 1983

Netherlands	28 - 3	Denmark

10 December 1983

Belgium	31 - 9	Denmark

Brussels

25 February 1984	Spain	32 - 6	Netherlands	Polideportivo Municipal de Orcasitas, Madrid
	Try: Nuñez (25'); Alvarez Cienfuegos (38'); Sainz (51'); Nuñez (59'); Amunárriz ('68); Con: Nuñez (51'); Nuñez (59'); Nuñez (68'); Pen: Díaz (10'); Díaz (40')		Try: Dudink (66'); Con: E. Hengeveld (66')	Attendance: 1.500 spectators Referee: Georges Bertrand (FFR)
Netherlands': André Marcker, 14.Edwin Jansma, 13.Erik Hengeveld, 12.Joost Takken, 11.Paul Hengeveld, 10.Bas Kasteel, 9.Hans Marcker, 8.Dick Altink (cap.), 7.Henk Batterman, 6.Louis Straathof, 5.John Dudink, 4.Anton Huizing, 3.Henny Vermuelen, 2.Mark Visser, 1.George de Vries - replacements: Rien Kroezen, John Dam				Attendance: 1.500 spectators Referee: Georges Bertrand (FFR)
Spain: 15.Isidro Oller, 14.Salvador Torres, 13.Jon Azkargorta, 12.Fernando García de la Torre, 11.Ricardo Sainz de la Cuesta, 10.Luis Nuñez Doval, 9.Javier Díaz Paternain, 8.Sergio Longhney, 7.Javier Amunárriz, 6.Felipe Blanco, 5.Ignacio Álvarez Cienfuegos, 4.Andrés Perea Ortega, 3. Tomás Pardo, 2.Domingo Baeza, 1.Antonio Machuca (cap.)

11 March 1984	Portugal	6 - 6	Spain	Lisbon University Stadium, Lisbon
	Pen: Queimado; Drop: Queimado		Pen: Nuñez Doval (2)	Referee: Sergio Tiboni (FIR)
Portugal: Luís Reis, 14.António Vieira de Almeida, 13.Domingo Megre, 12.Carlos Moita, 11.João Queimado, 10.Bernardo Marques Pinto, 9.João Marques Pinto, 8.António Ferreira, 7.Pedro Ferreira, 6.José Luís Rodrigues, 5.Faustino Pires, 4.António Leitão, 3.Luís Filipe de Morais, 2.Vasco Lynce, 1.Joaquim Pereira				Referee: Sergio Tiboni (FIR)
Spain: 15.Jon Azkargorta, 14.Luis Fernando Martin, 13.Salvador Torres, 12.Carlos Oteo, 11.Franscisco Puertas, 10.Luis Nuñez Doval, 9.Enrique Lobo, 8.Telmo Fernandez, 7.Sergio Longhney, 6.Eduardo Gonzalez Arbas, 5.Andrés Perea Ortega, 4.Mikel Elizalde, 3. Tomás Pardo, 2.Domingo Baeza, 1.Antonio Machuca (cap.) - replacements: Jesus Maria Ardeo

22 March 1984

Spain	12 - 3	Belgium

Estadio Pepe Rojo, Valladolid

24 March 1984

Portugal	21 - 3	Netherlands

Coimbra

5 April 1984

Belgium	9 - 12	Portugal

Brussels

8 April 1984

Denmark	3 - 40	Portugal

Copenhagen

28 April 1984

Denmark	13 - 53	Spain

Copenhagen

=== Pool B ===
Place	Nation	Games				Points			Table points
Place	Nation	played	won	drawn	lost	for	against	difference	Table points
1	Tunisia	4	4	0	0	90	37	+53	12
2	Czechoslovakia	4	3	0	1	65	49	+16	10
3	Sweden	4	2	0	2	37	58	-21	8
4	West Germany	4	1	0	3	63	53	+10	6
5	Yugoslavia	3	0	0	3	28	86	-58	3

- Tunisia promoted to division 1

25 September 1983

Czechoslovakia	20 - 10	Sweden

Prague

22 October 1983

Tunisia	25 - 6	Sweden

Monaco

29 October 1983

Tunisia	23 - 9	West Germany

Tunis

5 November 1983

Yugoslavia	16 - 20	Czechoslovakia

Split

13 November 1983

West Germany	38 - 0	Yugoslavia

Rudolf-Kalweit-Stadion, Hanover

15 April 1984

West Germany	3 - 15	Czechoslovakia

Fritz-Grunebaum-Sportpark, Heidelberg

5 May 1984

Sweden	15 - 13	Germany

Norrköping

13 May 1984

Czechoslovakia	10 - 20	Tunisia

Prague

5 May 1984

Yugoslavia	12 - 22	Tunisia

Split

1984

Sweden	6 – 0 Withdraw	Yugoslavia

withdraw

== Bibliography ==
- (in Italian) Francesco Volpe, Valerio Vecchiarelli (2000), 2000 Italia in Meta, Storia della nazionale italiana di rugby dagli albori al Sei Nazioni, GS Editore (2000) ISBN 88-87374-40-6.
- (in Italian) Francesco Volpe, Paolo Pacitti (Author), Rugby 2000, GTE Gruppo Editorale (1999).
