= Zimbabwe at the Rugby World Cup =

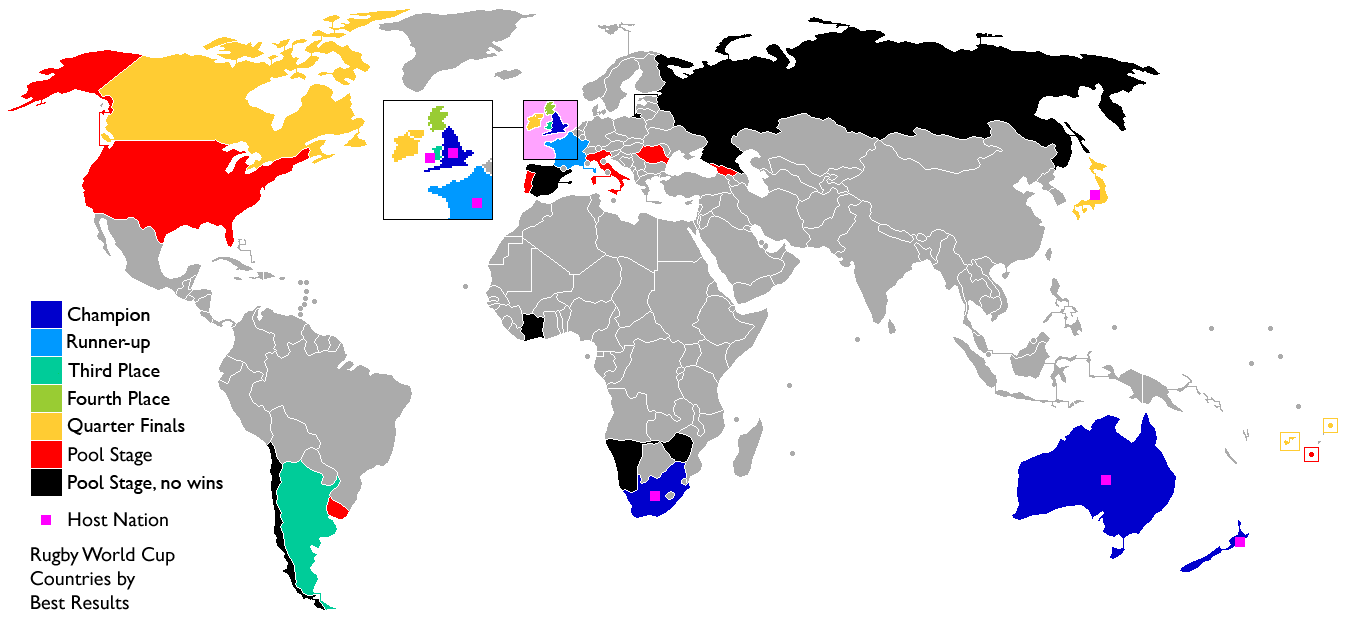
Map of nations best results, excluding nations which unsuccessfully participated in qualifying tournaments.

The Zimbabwe national rugby union team has appeared at two Rugby World Cups – in 1987 and 1991 - and qualified for the upcoming 2027 tournament.

In 1987, Zimbabwe was the only African nation invited to compete; South Africa was disqualified from the tournament due to a sporting boycott adopted by the international community in response to apartheid. Four years later, Zimbabwe succeeded in getting through qualifying, and hosted the Africa qualifications. In more recent years, the Namibia national rugby union team has generally defeated Zimbabwe in African qualifying rounds.

Nation	Number of appearances	First appearance	Most recent appearance	Streak	Best result
Zimbabwe	2	1987	1991	2	No games won

== By position ==
Rugby World Cup record									Qualification						
Year	Round	Pld	W	D	L	PF	PA	Squad	Pos	Pld	W	D	L	PF	PA
(New Zealand) (Australia) 1987	Pool stage	3	0	0	3	53	151	Squad	Invited						
(England) (France) (Ireland) (Scotland) (Wales) 1991	Pool stage	3	0	0	3	31	158	Squad	1st	3	3	0	0	62	12
(South Africa) 1995	Did not qualify								3rd	6	3	0	3	169	120
(Wales) 1999	Did not qualify								3rd	5	2	0	3	124	95
(Australia) 2003	Did not qualify								2nd	2	1	0	1	82	45
(France) 2007	Did not qualify								P/O	4	2	0	2	55	84
(New Zealand) 2011	Did not qualify								3rd	1	0	0	1	21	35
(England) 2015	Did not qualify								P/O	6	3	0	3	175	126
(Japan) 2019	Did not qualify								5th	10	2	1	7	250	319
(France) 2023	Did not qualify								P/O	4	3	0	1	253	53
(Australia) 2027	Qualified								1st	6	6	0	0	185	92
(United States) 2031	To be determined								To be determined						
Total	—	6	0	0	6	84	309	—	—	47	25	1	21	1376	991
Champions; Runners–up; Third place; Fourth place; Home venue

== Matches ==
=== 1987 Rugby World Cup ===
Pool 4

Team	Pld	W	D	L	PF	PA	PD	T	Pts	Qualification
France	3	2	1	0	145	44	+101	25	5 (Note: France qualify as pool winner having scored three tries to Scotland's two in their drawn match.)	Knockout stage
Scotland	3	2	1	0	135	69	+66	22	5	Knockout stage
Romania	3	1	0	2	61	130	−69	6	2	
Zimbabwe	3	0	0	3	53	151	−98	5	0	

Notes:

23 May 1987

Romania	21–20	Zimbabwe
Try: Paraschiv; Toader; Hodorcă; Pen: A. Dumitru (3)		Try: Tsimba (2); Neill; Con: Ferreira; Pen: Ferreira (2)

Eden Park, Auckland
Attendance: 4,500
Referee: Stephen Hilditch (Ireland)

30 May 1987

Scotland	60–21	Zimbabwe
Try: Tait (2); Tukalo (2); Duncan (2); Paxton (2); Oliver; Hastings; Jeffrey; Con: Hastings (8)		Try: Buitendag; Con: Grobler; Pen: Grobler (5)

Athletic Park, Wellington
Attendance: 12,000
Referee: David Burnett (Ireland)

2 June 1987

France	70–12	Zimbabwe
Try: Modin (3); Camberabero (3); Charvet (2); Rodriguez (2); Dubroca; Estève; Laporte; Con: Camberabero (9)		Try: Kaulback; Con: Grobler; Pen: Grobler (2)

Eden Park, Auckland
Attendance: 3,000
Referee: Derek Bevan (Wales)

=== 1991 Rugby World Cup ===
Pool 2

Team	Pld	W	D	L	PF	PA	PD	Pts
Scotland	3	3	0	0	122	36	+86	6
Ireland	3	2	0	1	102	51	+51	4
Japan	3	1	0	2	77	87	−10	2
Zimbabwe	3	0	0	3	31	158	−127	0

6 October 1991

Ireland	55–11	Zimbabwe
Tries: Robinson (4), Popplewell (2), Geoghegan, Curtis; Con: Keyes (4); Pen: Keyes (5)		Tries: Dawson, Schultz; Pen: Ferreira

Lansdowne Road, Dublin
Referee: Keith Lawrence (New Zealand)

9 October 1991

Scotland	51–12	Zimbabwe
Tries: Tukalo (3), Turnbull, S. Hastings, Stanger, Weir, White; Con: Dods (5); Pen: Dods (2); Drop: Wylie		Tries: Garvey (2); Con: Currin (2)

Murrayfield, Edinburgh
Referee: Don Reordan (United States)

14 October 1991

Japan	52–8	Zimbabwe
Tries: Yoshida (2), Mashuho (2), Kutsuki (2), Horikoshi, Luaiufi, Matsuo; Con: Hosokawa (2); Pen: Hosokawa (4)		Tries: Tsimba, Nguruve

Ravenhill, Belfast
Referee: Rene Hourquet (France)

=== 1995 Rugby World Cup ===
Did not qualify.

=== 1999 Rugby World Cup ===
Did not qualify.

=== 2003 Rugby World Cup ===
Did not qualify.

=== 2007 Rugby World Cup ===
Did not qualify.

=== 2011 Rugby World Cup ===
Did not qualify.

=== 2015 Rugby World Cup ===
Did not qualify.

=== 2019 Rugby World Cup ===
Did not qualify.

=== 2023 Rugby World Cup ===
Did not qualify.

=== 2027 Rugby World Cup ===
Zimbabwe qualified for the 2027 World Cup after winning the 2025 Rugby Africa Cup. Their pool will be announced in December 2025.

== Overall record ==
Country	Pld	W	D	L	F	A	+/−	%
Romania	1	0	0	1	20	21	−1	0
Ireland	1	0	0	1	11	55	−44	0
Japan	1	0	0	1	8	52	−44	0
France	1	0	0	1	12	70	−58	0
Scotland	2	0	0	2	33	113	−80	0
Total	6	0	0	6	105	373	−268	0

== Team records ==
Most points in a tournament

- 53 (1987)
- 31 (1991)

Most points scored in a game

- 21 vs Scotland (1987)
- 20 vs Romania (1987)
- 12 vs Scotland (1991)
- 12 vs France (1987)

Biggest winning margin

- n/a

Most points conceded in a game

- 70 vs France (1987)
- 60 vs Scotland (1987)
- 55 vs Ireland (1991)
- 52 vs Japan (1991)
- 51 vs Scotland (1991)

Biggest losing margin

- 58 vs France (1987)
- 44 vs Ireland (1991)
- 44 vs Japan (1991)
- 39 vs Scotland (1987)
- 39 vs Scotland (1991)

Most tries scored in a game

- 3 vs Romania (1987)
- 2 vs Scotland (1991)
- 2 vs Ireland (1991)
- 2 vs Japan (1991)

== Individual records ==
Most appearances

- 6 Michael Martin (1987, 1991)
- 5 Richard Tsimba (1987, 1991)
- 4 Andy Ferreria (1987, 1991)
- 4 Craig Brown (1987, 1991)
- 4 Alex Nicholis (1987, 1991)

Most points overall

- 25 Marthinus Grobler (1987)
- 12 Richard Tsimba (1987, 1991)
- 11 Andy Ferreria (1987, 1991)
- 8 Adrian Garvey (1991)

Most points in a game

- 17 vs Scotland – Marthinus Grobler (1987)
- 8 vs Scotland – Adrian Garvey (1991)
- 8 vs Romania – Andy Ferreria (1987)
- 6 vs Romania – Richard Tsimba (1987)

Most tries overall

- 2 Richard Tsimba (1987, 1991)
- 2 Adrian Garvey (1991)

Most penalty goals

- 7 Marthinus Grobler (1987)
- 3 Andy Ferreria (1987, 1991)

Most penalty goals in a game

- 5 vs Scotland – Marthinus Grobler (1987)
- 2 vs France – Marthinus Grobler (1987)
- 2 vs Romania – Andy Ferreria (1987)
- 1 vs Ireland – Andy Ferreria (1991)
