= 1982–83 FIRA Trophy =

European rugby union championship

1982-83 FIRA Trophy
- Date: 24 October 1982 – 22 May 1983
- Countries: France; Italy; West Germany; Morocco; Romania; Soviet Union

Tournament statistics
- Champions: Romania
- Grand Slam: Romania
- Matches played: 15

The 1982–83 FIRA Trophy was the 23rd edition of a European rugby union championship for national teams.

The tournament was won by Romania, with a Grand Slam. Romania managed to defeat France at home (13-6). The French would finish in a disappointing 4th place, behind Italy and the Soviet Union. Italy reached a brilliant 2nd place, with a draw with France (6-6) at home, and a single loss to Romania (13-6) abroad. West Germany finished in 6th place, with five losses, and were relegated. Poland won the Second division and were promoted for the following season.

== First division ==
The first division returned to the six teams format.

- Table

Place	Nation	Games				Points			Table points
Place	Nation	played	won	drawn	lost	for	against	difference	Table points
1	Romania	5	5	0	0	95	40	+55	15
2	Italy	5	3	1	1	60	35	+25	12
3	Soviet Union	5	3	0	2	80	54	+26	11
4	France	5	2	1	2	121	40	+81	10
5	Morocco	5	1	0	4	43	87	-44	7
6	West Germany	5	0	0	5	37	180	-143	5

Germany relegated to second division

- Results

Point system: try 4 pt, conversion: 2 pt., penalty kick 3 pt. drop 3 pt
Click "show" for more info about match (scorers, line-up etc)

24 October 1982

Soviet Union	31 - 9	West Germany

Fili Stadium, Moscow
Attendance: 4,000

31 October 1982	Romania	13 - 9	France	Stadionul Dinamo, Bucharest
	Try: Paraschiv; Pen: Ion, Podarescu; Drop: Podarescu		Try: Michel Fabre; Con: Camberabero; Drop: Camberabero	Attendance: 9,000; Referee: J.Anderson (Scotland)
Romania: 15.Vasile Ion, 14.Sorin Fuicu, 13.Mihai Holban, 12.Adrian Lungu, 11.Marian Aldea, 10.Stelian Podarescu, 9.Mircea Paraschiv (cap.), 8.Gheorghie Dumitru, 7.Enciu Stoica, 6.Florica Murariu, 5.Gheorghie Caragea, 4.Gheorghie Daraban, 3.Constantin Dinu, 2.Mircea Munteanu, 1.Ion Bucan				Attendance: 9,000; Referee: J.Anderson (Scotland)
France: 15.Serge Blanco, 14.Michel Fabre, 13.Philippe Sella, 12.Pierre Chadebech, 11.Patrick Estève, 10.Didier Camberabero, 9.Pierre Berbizier, 8.Jean-Luc Joinel, 7.Laurent Rodriguez, 6.Jean-Pierre Rives (cap.), 5.Jean Condom, 4.Daniel Revailler, 3.Robert Paparemborde, 2.Philippe Dintrans, 1.Pierre Dospital - replacements: 16.Éric Buchet

1 November 1982

France XV	6 - 12	Soviet Union

Stade Robert-Brettes, Mérignac

7 November 1982

West Germany	3 - 23	Italy

Rudolf-Kalweit-Stadion, Hanover
Referee: (France) Senssac

19 December 1982

Morocco	3 - 13	Italy

COC Stadium, Casablanca
Attendance: 3,000
Referee: (France) G. Maurette

6 February 1983

Italy	6 - 6	France A1
Try: Zanon; Con: Bettarello		Try: Mothe; Con: Lescure

Stadio Comunale Mario Battaglini, Rovigo
Referee: (Wales) K. Parfitt

20 February 1983

France XV	84 - 0	West Germany

Stade Marcel-Verchère, Bourg-en-Bresse

27 February 1983

Morocco	3 - 28	Romania

Casablanca

27 March 1983

West Germany	12 - 26	Romania

Fritz-Grunebaum-Sportpark, Heidelberg

10 April 1983

Morocco	9 - 16	France XV

Casablanca

10 April 1983	Romania	13 - 6	Italy	Stadionul Gloria, Buzau
	Try: Varzaru; Pen: Alexandru, Ion (2)		Pen: Bettarello; Drop: Bettarello	Attendance: 2,000; Referee: (England) A. Welsby
Romania: 15.Vasile Ion, 14.Sorin Fuicu, 13.Adrian Lungu, 12.Gheorghie Varzaru, 11.Marian Aldea, 10.Dumitru Alexandru, 9.Mircea Paraschiv, 8.O. Sugar, 7.Gheorghie Dumitru, 6.Florica Murariu, 5.Gheorghie Caragea, 4.Gheorghie Daraban, 3.Constantin Dinu, 2.Mircea Munteanu, 1.Ion Bucan - replacements: 16.Pompiliu Bors, 17.Vasile Pascu				Attendance: 2,000; Referee: (England) A. Welsby
Italy: 15.Fabrizio Gaetaniello (cap.), 14.Alberto Osti, 13.Massimo Mascioletti, 12.Rino Francescato, 11.Andrea Azzali, 10.Stefano Bettarello, 9.Alessandro Ghini, 8.Claudio Tinari, 7.Gianni Zanon, 6.Giuseppe Artuso, 5.Mauro Gardin, 4.Antonio Colella, 3.Guido Rossi, 2.Giorgio Morelli, 1.Renato de Bernardo - replacements: 16.Fulvio Lorigiola

8 May 1983

West Germany	13 - 16	Morocco

Fritz-Grunebaum-Sportpark, Heidelberg

11 May 1983

Soviet Union	17 - 12	Morocco

Spartak Stadium, Kiev

15 May 1983

Soviet Union	10 - 15	Romania
Try: Kushnarev; Pen: Bobrov (2)		Try: Murariu, Dumitru, Munteanu; Pen: Dumitru

Spartak Stadium, Kiev
Attendance: 7,000
Referee: (Italy) N. Camaduro

22 May 1983

Italy	12 - 10	Soviet Union
Try: Ghizzoni; Con: Bettarello; Pen: Bettarello; Drop: Bettarello		Try: Hairulin; Pen: Berzin (2)

Stadio Santa Maria Goretti, Catania
Referee: (France) J.-C. Yché

== Second division ==
- Table

Place	Nation	Games				Points			Table points
Place	Nation	played	won	drawn	lost	for	against	difference	Table points
1	Poland	4	3	0	1	82	30	+52	10
2	Spain	4	3	0	1	83	26	+57	10
3	Portugal	4	2	0	2	38	46	-8	8
4	Netherlands	4	2	0	2	38	58	-20	8
5	Sweden	4	0	0	4	25	106	-81	4

- Poland promoted to division 1
- Results

10 October 1982

Poland	6 - 13	Netherlands

Warsaw

24 October 1982

Poland	54 - 6	Sweden

Poznań

6 November 1982

Sweden	7 - 16	Netherlands

Malmö

13 March 1983

Netherlands	3 - 32	Spain

Sportpark Berestein, Hilversum

26 March 1983

Spain	25 - 4	Portugal
Try: Egido Sancho, Rivero Macía, Tormo, Oteo; Con: Nuñez Doval (3); Drop: Nuñez Doval		Try: Novais Reis

Estadio de Vallehermoso, Madrid
Attendance: 2,000

10 April 1983

Netherlands	6 - 13	Portugal

Sportpark Berestein, Hilversum

24 April 1983

Spain	7 - 16	Poland

Polideportivo El Saler, Valencia

30 April 1983

Portugal	4 - 6	Poland

Lisbon University Stadium, Lisbon

8 May 1983

Sweden	3 - 19	Spain

Arstad

21 May 1983

Portugal	17 - 9	Sweden

Lisbon University Stadium, Lisbon
Attendance: 500

== Third division ==
- Table

Place	Nation	Games				Points			Table points
Place	Nation	played	won	drawn	lost	for	against	difference	Table points
1	Czechoslovakia	4	4	0	0	67	31	+36	12
2	Tunisia	4	3	0	1	64	33	+31	10
3	Yugoslavia	4	2	0	2	73	80	-7	8
4	Belgium	4	1	0	3	44	65	-21	6
5	Switzerland	4	0	0	4	37	76	-39	4

Czechoslovakia promoted to division 2

- Results

14 November 1982

Czechoslovakia	17 - 9	Yugoslavia

Prague

27 November 1982

Belgium	6 - 21	Czechoslovakia

Brussels

27 November 1982

Yugoslavia	36 - 19	Switzerland

12 December 1982

Tunisia	3 - 0	Switzerland

Tunis

23 October 1982

Belgium	12 - 13	Tunisia

Brussels

5 March 1983

Switzerland	9 - 23	Belgium

Geneva

23 April 1983

Switzerland	9 - 14	Czechoslovakia

Nafels

30 April 1983

Yugoslavia	22 - 3	Belgium

Ljubliana

7 May 1983

Czechoslovakia	15 - 7	Tunisia

Prague

14 May 1983

Tunisia	41 - 6	Yugoslavia

Tunis

== Bibliography ==
- (in Italian) Francesco Volpe, Valerio Vecchiarelli (2000), 2000 Italia in Meta, Storia della nazionale italiana di rugby dagli albori al Sei Nazioni, GS Editore (2000) ISBN 88-87374-40-6.
- (in Italian) Francesco Volpe, Paolo Pacitti (Author), Rugby 2000, GTE Gruppo Editorale (1999).
