= 1981–82 FIRA Trophy =

European rugby union championship

1981-82 FIRA Trophy
- Date: 25 October 1981 – 22 May 1982
- Countries: France; Italy; Romania; Soviet Union; West Germany

Tournament statistics
- Champions: France
- Matches played: 10

The 1981–82 FIRA Trophy was the 22nd edition of a European rugby union championship for national teams.

The first division number of teams was reduced to five teams, instead of the previous six. The tournament was won by France, with three wins and a single draw, in the final game, a 10–10 draw with Soviet Union abroad. France only awarded caps in their 17–9 win over the strong side of Romania. Italy finished in 2nd place, with two wins, a draw and a loss, ahead of Romania, who had two wins and two losses. Soviet Union finished in a disappointing 4th place, not being able to win a single game.

== First division ==
- Table

Place	Nation	Games				Points			Table points
Place	Nation	played	won	drawn	lost	for	against	difference	Table points
1	France	4	3	1	0	105	53	+52	11
2	Italy	4	2	1	1	75	52	+23	9
3	Romania	4	2	0	2	102	59	+43	8
4	Soviet Union	4	0	2	2	32	50	-18	6
5	West Germany	4	1	0	3	43	143	-100	6

No relegations

- Results

Point system: try 4 pt, conversion: 2 pt., penalty kick 3 pt. drop 3 pt
Click "show" for more info about match (scorers, line-up etc)

25 October 1981

Soviet Union	12 - 12	Italy

Moscow

1 November 1981	France	17 - 9	Romania	Stade de l'Egassiaral, Narbonne
	Try: Blanco, Elissalde; Pen: Gabernet 2 Drop: Laporte		Pen: Constantin 3	Referee: J.A.F. Trigg (England)
France:15.Serge Gabernet, 14.Michel Fabre, 13.Patrick Mesny, 12.Roland Bertranne, 11.Serge Blanco, 10.Guy Laporte, 7.Pierre Lacans, 6.Laurent Rodriguez, 5.Daniel Revailler, 4.Alain Lorieux, 3.Robert Paparemborde (cap.), 2.Philippe Dintrans, 1.Michel Crémaschi9.Jean-Pierre Elissalde, 8.Jean-Luc Joinel,				Referee: J.A.F. Trigg (England)
Romania:15.Gheorghe Florea, 14.Sorin Fuicu, 13.Adrian Lungu, 12.Ion Constantin, 11.Marian Aldea, 10.Dumitru Alexandru, 7.Alexandru Radulescu, 6.Enciu Stoica, 5.Gheorghie Caragea, 4.Gheorghie Dumitru, 3.Constantin Dinu, 2.Mircea Munteanu, 1.Ion Bucan9.Mircea Paraschiv (cap.), 8.Pompiliu Bors, - replacements: 16.Gheorghie Varzaru

1 November 1981

West Germany	10 - 7	Soviet Union

Rudolf-Kalweit-Stadion, Hanover

29 November 1981

Italy	23 - 0	West Germany

Stadio Mario Battaglini, Rovigo

21 February 1982

France A1	25 - 19	Italy

Stade Albert Domec, Carcassonne

21 March 1982

West Germany	15 - 53	France A1

Fritz-Grunebaum-Sportpark, Heidelberg

4 April 1982

Romania	60 - 18	West Germany

Bucharest

11 April 1982	Italy	21 - 15	Romania	St. Battaglini, Rovigo
	Try: Azzali, Ghizzoni; Con: Bettarello 2 Pen: Bettarello 3		Try: Mot 2 Con: Podarascu 2 Pen: Podarascu	Referee: Corris Thomas (Wales)
Italy:15.Fabrizio Gaetaniello (cap.), 14.Serafino Ghizzoni, 13.Massimo Mascioletti, 12.Giancarlo Morelli, 11.Andrea Azzali, 10.Stefano Bettarello, 7.Marzio Innocenti, 6.Claudio Jannone, 5.Mario Nicolosi, 4.Stefano Annibal, 3.Giancarlo Pivetta, 2.Giorgio Morelli, 1.Renato de Bernardo9.Alessandro Ghini, 8.Gianni Zanon, - replacements: 16.Claudio Torresan				Referee: Corris Thomas (Wales)
Romania:15.Gheorghe Florea, 14.Ion Constantin, 13.Adrian Lungu, 12.Olimpiu Becheș, 11.Marian Aldea, 10.Stelian Podarascu, 7.M. Guramare, 6.Alexandru Radulescu, 5.Gheorghie Dumitru, 4.Gheorghie Caragea, 3.Dinu Gheorghe, 2.Marin Mot, 1.Ion Bucan9.Mircea Paraschiv, 8.Enciu Stoica, - replacements: 16.Florin Constantin

9 May 1982

Romania	18 - 3	Soviet Union

Bucharest

22 May 1982

Soviet Union	10 - 10	France A1

Moscow

== Second division ==
- Table

Place	Nation	Games				Points			Table points
Place	Nation	played	won	drawn	lost	for	against	difference	Table points
1	Morocco	5	5	0	0	54	17	+37	15
2	Poland	5	4	0	1	108	37	+71	13
3	Spain	5	3	0	2	70	66	+4	10
4	Netherlands	5	1	0	4	51	76	-25	7
5	Portugal	5	1	0	4	62	124	-62	7
6	Tunisia	5	1	0	4	32	57	-25	7

Morocco Promoted to division 1

Tunisia relegated to division 3

- Results

4 October 1981

Netherlands	9 - 19	Poland

Sportpark Berestein, Hilversum

1 November 1981

Morocco	6 - 3	Poland

Casablanca

1 July 1982

Morocco	6 - 4	Tunisia

Casablanca

1982

Netherlands	3 - 10	Morocco

Sportpark Berestein, Hilversum

21 February 1982

Morocco	6 - 0 withdraw	Spain

7 March 1982

Spain	25 - 12	Netherlands

La Foixarda, Barcelona

21 March 1982

Portugal	7 - 26	Morocco

Estadio Universitario, Lisbon

28 March 1982	Portugal	13 - 32	Spain	Estadio Universitario, Lisbon
	Try: Ferreira; Con: Costa
Portugal:15.Carlos Moita, 14.Luís Roxo, 13.Manuel Paisana, 12.Dídio Aguiar, 11.Domingos Megre, 10.Eduardo Trigo de Morais, 9.António Ferreira, 8.Bernardo Marques Pinto, 7.Vasco Lynce de Faria, 6.Luís Carlos Costa, 5.Luis Filipe Oliveira, 4.Amadeu Monteiro, 3.António Duque, 2.João Paulo Bessa, 1.João Carlos Fernandes - replacements: 16.António Leitão, 17.João Marques Pinto
Spain:15.Salvador Torres, 14.Gabriel Rivero, 13.José Francisco Lorenzo Berberana, 12.José Carlos de la Macorra, 11.Fernando García de la Torre, 10.Manolo Moriche (cap.), 9.Carlos Encabo, 8.Juan Francisco Neira, 7.Sergi Longhney, 6.Felipe Blanco, 5.Ángel García Guerrero, 4.Carlos Rodríguez García, 3.Antonio Machuca, 2.Santiago Santos, 1.Ramón Nuche

17 April 1982

Portugal	13 - 16	Tunisia

Estadio Universitario, Lisbon

25 April 1982

Netherlands	12 - 16	Portugal

Sportpark Berestein, Hilversum

25 April 1982

Spain U.23	7 - 3	Tunisia

Burgos

28 April 1982

Poland	38 - 13	Portugal

Łódź

1982

Tunisia	3 - 16	Poland

Tunis

1982

Tunisia	6 - 15	Netherlands

Tunis

8 November 1982

Poland	32 - 6	Spain

Lublin

== Third division ==
- Table

Place	Nation	Games				Points			Table points
Place	Nation	played	won	drawn	lost	for	against	difference	Table points
1	Sweden	4	4	0	0	77	27	+50	12
2	Belgium	4	3	0	1	44	33	11	10
3	Yugoslavia	4	2	0	2	65	30	35	8
4	Switzerland	4	1	0	3	43	51	-8	6
5	Denmark	4	0	0	4	43	131	-88	4

Sweden promoted to division 2

- Results

24 October 1981

Sweden	15 - 9	Belgium

Karlstad

25 October 1981

Switzerland	34 - 21	Denmark

Lausanne

15 November 1981

Denmark	6 - 35	Sweden

Copenhagen

29 November 1981

Belgium	9 - 0	Yugoslavia

Liège

15 May 1982

Yugoslavia	46 - 4	Denmark

Zenica

27 November 1981

Switzerland	0 - 10	Yugoslavia

Lausanne

6 March 1982

Belgium	10 - 6	Switzerland

Antwerp

24 April 1982

Denmark	12 - 16	Belgium

Copenhagen

8 May 1982

Yugoslavia	9 - 17	Sweden

Lubliana

20 May 1982

Sweden	10 - 3	Switzerland

Enkoping

== Bibliography ==
- (in Italian) Francesco Volpe, Valerio Vecchiarelli (2000), 2000 Italia in Meta, Storia della nazionale italiana di rugby dagli albori al Sei Nazioni, GS Editore (2000) ISBN 88-87374-40-6.
- (in Italian) Francesco Volpe, Paolo Pacitti (Author), Rugby 2000, GTE Gruppo Editorale (1999).
