= 1979–80 FIRA Trophy =

European rugby union championship

1979-80 FIRA Trophy
- Date: 30 September 1979 – 28 May 1980
- Countries: France; Italy; Romania; Morocco; Poland; Soviet Union

Tournament statistics
- Champions: France
- Matches played: 15

The 1979–1980 FIRA Trophy was the 20th edition of a European rugby union championship for national teams.

The tournament was won by France, who achieved a Grand Slam.

== First division ==
- Table

Place	Nation	Games				Points			Table points
Place	Nation	played	won	drawn	lost	for	against	difference	Table points
1	France	5	5	0	0	169	32	+137	15
2	Romania	5	3	0	2	142	86	+56	11
3	Soviet Union	5	3	0	2	87	54	+33	11
4	Italy	5	3	0	2	80	81	-1	11
5	Poland	5	1	0	4	56	171	-115	7
6	Morocco	5	0	0	5	37	147	-110	5

Morocco relegated to division 2

- Results

Point system: try 4 pt, conversion: 2 pt., penalty kick 3 pt. drop 3 pt
Click "show" for more info about match (scorers, line-up etc)

30 September 1979

Poland	3 - 13	Italy

Sochaczew

28 October 1979

Soviet Union	9 - 0	Italy

Moscow

18 November 1979

Romania	49 - 15	Poland

Bucharest

2 December 1979	France	30 - 12	Romania	Stade de Sapiac, Montauban
	Try: Bertranne, Codorniou; Joinel; Con: Aguirre 2, Caussade; Pen: Aguirre, Caussade 2		Pen: Constantin 3 Drop: Constantin	Referee: JA Short (Scotland)
France:15.Jean-Michel Aguirre, 14.Jean-Francois Gourdon, 13.Roland Bertranne, 12.Didier Codorniou, 11.Frédéric Costes, 10.Alain Caussade, 9.Jerome Gallion, 8.Jacques Cristina, 7.Jean-Luc Joinel, 6.Jean-Pierre Rives (cap.), 5.Jean-Francois Marchal, 4.Francis Haget, 3.Robert Paparemborde, 2.Philippe Dintrans, 1.Patrick Salas				Referee: JA Short (Scotland)
Romania:15.Ion Simion, 14.Alexandru Marin, 13.Ion Zafiescu, 12.Ion Constantin, 11.Marian Aldea, 10.Stelian Podarascu,9.Eduard Suciu, 8.Gheorghie Dumitru, 7.Enciu Stoica, 6.Florică Murariu, 5.Marin Ionescu, 4.I. Pintea, 3.Corneliu Scarlat, 2.Mircea Ortelecan, 1.Ion Bucan (cap.), - replacements: 16.Ioan Urdea, 17.Dumitru Alexandru

22 December 1979

Italy	34 - 6	Morocco

Stadio Pacevecchia, Benevento

1980

Soviet Union	54 - 10	Poland

Moscow

3 February 1980

Morocco	4 - 33	France XV

Casablanca

17 February 1980

France A1	46 - 9	Italy

Stade Marcel-Michelin, Clermont Ferrand

13 April 1980	Italy	24 - 17	Romania	Fattori, L'Aquila
	Try: Bargelli, de Anna, N Francescato, Mascioletti; Con: Bettarello; Pen: Bettarello 2		Try: Aldea, Stoica; Pen: Constantin 3	Referee: R.Quintetton (England)
Italy:15.Claudio Torresan, 14.Serafino Ghizzoni, 13.Rino Francescato, 12.Nello Francescato, 11.Massimo Mascioletti, 10.Stefano Bettarello, 9.Fulvio Lorigiola, 8.Paolo Mariani, 7.Franco Bargelli, 6.Elio de Anna, 5.Giuseppe Artuso, 4.Louis Basei, 3.Ambrogio Bona (cap.), 2.Claudio Robazza, 1.Giancarlo Cucchiella				Referee: R.Quintetton (England)
Romania:15.Mihai Bucos, 14.Petre Motrescu, 13.Ion Constantin, 12.Adrian Lungu, 11.M. Chiricencu, 10.Dumitru Alexandru, 9.Mircea Paraschiv, 8.Enciu Stoica, 7.Pompiliu Bors, 6.Florică Murariu, 5.Gheorghe Dumitru, 4.I. Pintea, 3.Corneliu Scarlat, 2.Mircea Munteanu, 1.Ion Bucan - replacements: 16.Marian Aldea

27 April 1980

Poland	28 - 13	Morocco

Bytom

30 April 1980

Romania	41 - 11	Morocco

Constanta

11 May 1980

Romania	23 - 6	Soviet Union

Bucharest

15 May 1980

Poland	0 - 42	France XV

Łódź

18 May 1980

Soviet Union	7 - 18	France XV

Moscow

1980

Morocco	3 - 11	Soviet Union

Casablanca

== Second division ==
- Table

Place	Nation	Games				Points			Table points
Place	Nation	played	won	drawn	lost	for	against	difference	Table points
1	Spain	4	4	0	0	101	33	+68	12
2	Yugoslavia	4	2	1	1	33	41	-8	9
3	Netherlands	4	2	0	2	37	44	-7	8
4	West Germany	4	1	1	2	26	39	-13	7
5	Sweden	4	0	0	4	35	75	-40	4

Spain promoted to division 1

Sweden relegated to division 3

- Results

20 October 1979

Sweden	4 - 10	West Germany

Sollentuna

4 November 1979

Netherlands	12 - 0	Sweden

Sportpark Berestein, Hilversum

25 November 1979

West Germany	0 - 13	Spain

Fritz-Grunebaum-Sportpark, Heidelberg

16 December 1979

Yugoslavia	10 - 6	Netherlands

Ljubliana

22 December 1979

Spain	25 - 3	Yugoslavia

Polideportivo Municipal de Orcasitas, Madrid

30 March 1980

Netherlands	16 - 10	West Germany

Sportpark Berestein, Hilversum

28 April 1980

Spain	24 - 3	Netherlands

La Foixarda, Barcelona

3 May 1980

West Germany	6 - 6	Yugoslavia

Rudolf-Kalweit-Stadion, Hanover

17 May 1980

Yugoslavia	14 - 4	Sweden

Split

9 June 1980

Sweden	27 - 39	Spain

Uppsala

== Third Division ==
- Table

Place	Nation	Games				Points			Table points
Place	Nation	played	won	drawn	lost	for	against	difference	Table points
1	Tunisia	2	2	0	0	30	20	+10	6
2	Belgium	2	1	0	1	59	19	+40	4
3	Denmark	2	0	0	2	21	71	-50	2

- Results

14 October 1979

Belgium	52 - 8	Denmark

Brussels

3 February 1980

Belgium	7 - 11	Tunisia

Tunis

3 May 1980

Denmark	13 - 19	Tunisia

Tunisia promoted to division 2

== Bibliography ==
- (in Italian) Francesco Volpe, Valerio Vecchiarelli (2000), 2000 Italia in Meta, Storia della nazionale italiana di rugby dagli albori al Sei Nazioni, GS Editore (2000) ISBN 88-87374-40-6.
- (in Italian) Francesco Volpe, Paolo Pacitti (Author), Rugby 2000, GTE Gruppo Editorale (1999).
