= 1981 Romania rugby union tour of Scotland =

- Manager: Viorel Morariu
- Tour captain: Mircea Paraschiv
- Top point scorer: Ion Constantin (26)
Summary
P	W	D	L
Total
3	2	0	1
Test match
1	0	0	1
Opponent
P	W	D	L
Scotland
1	0	0	1

The 1981 Romania rugby union tour of Scotland was a series of three matches played by the Romania national rugby union team in Scotland in September 1981. Romania won two of their three matches but lost the international match against the Scotland national rugby union team. Scotland awarded full international caps to its players for the match, becoming the first British country to do so for a match against Romania.

== Touring party ==
- Manager: Viorel Morariu
- Assistant Managers: Valeriu Irimescu
- Captain: Mircea Paraschiv

=== Backs ===
- Gheorghe Florea
- Sorin Fuicu
- Gheorghe Vacaru
- Marian Aldea
- Gheorghe Vărzaru
- Ion Constantin
- Adrian Lungu
- Dumitru Alexandru
- Mircea Paraschiv
- Eduard Suciu
- Stelian Podarescu

=== Forwards ===
- Costica Florea
- Alexandru Radulescu
- Enciu Stoica
- Gheorghe Dumitru
- Pompiliu Borș
- Gheorghe Caragea
- Ștefan Constantin
- Corneliu Scarlat
- Emilian Grigore
- Ion Bucan
- Constantin Dinu
- Mircea Muntean
- Mircea Ortelecan
- Corneliu Gheorghe
- Octavian Corneliu

== Results Summary ==
Scores and results list Romania's points tally first.

Opposing Team	Result	For	Against	Date	Venue
Edinburgh	Won	18	13	19 September	Myreside, Edinburgh
South of Scotland	Won	18	10	22 September	The Greenyards, Melrose
SCOTLAND	Lost	6	12	26 September	Murrayfield, Edinburgh

== Matches ==
19 Sep 1981

Edinburgh	13-18	Romanians
Try: G. Watson; Hay; Con: Irvine; Pen: Irvine		Try: Munteanu; Bors; Con: I. Constantin (2); Pen: I. Constantin (2)

Myreside
Referee: R. Hourquet (France)

Edinburgh: A. R. Irvine (Heriot's F. P.) (c), I. Tukalo (Royal High), A. E. Kennedy (Watsonians), D. I. Johnston (Watsonians), B. H. Hay (Boroughmuir), K. D. M. Wilson (Boroughmuir), A. J. M. Lawson (Heriot's F. P.); W. S. Watson (Boroughmuir), D. Robertson (Heriot's F. P.), D. G. Armstrong (Leith Academicals), G. M. Watson (Boroughmuir), J. H. Calder (Stewart's-Melville F. P.), I. G. Milne (Heriot's F. P.), P. A. Black (Boroughmuir), N. A. Rowan (Boroughmuir). Romanians: G. Florea, S. Fuicu, A. Lungu, I. Constantin, M. Aldea, D. Alexandru, M. Paraschiv (c); P. Bors, E. Stoica, G. Caragea, G. Dumitru, A. Radalescu, O. Corneliu, M. Munteanu, I. Bucan (C. Dinu, 78 mins).

22 Sep 1981

South of Scotland	10-18	Romanians
Try: Baird; Pen: Brown (2)		Try: Podarescu; Stoica; Con: I. Constantin (2); Pen: I. Constantin; Drop: I. Constantin

The Greenyards, Melrose
Referee: F. Howard (England)

South of Scotland: A. R. Brown (Gala), V. T. .S. Chlebowski (Gala), K. T. Murray (Hawick), A. G. Cranston (Hawick) (c), G. R. T. Baird (Kelso), A. M. B. Ker (Kelso), I. G. Hunter (Selkirk); A. J. Campbell (Hawick), R. A> Lindores (Jedforest), T. J. Smith (Gala), K. R. Macaulay (Gala), G. Dickson (Gala), R. F. Cunningham (Gala), G. J. Callander (Kelso), B. Hislop (Langholm). Romanians: G. Florea, A. Lungu, G. Varzaru, I. Constantin, M. Aldea, S. Podarescu, E. Suciu; S Constantin, E. Stoica, G. Caragea, G. Dumitru (c), P. Bors, C. Scarlat, E. Grigore, C. Dinu.

26 Sep 1981

Scotland	12-6	Romania
Pen: Irvine (4)		Pen: I. Constantin (2)

Murrayfield, Edinburgh
Referee: M. D. M. Rea (Ireland)

Scotland: A. R. Irvine (Heriot's F. P.) (c), S. Munro (West of Scotland), J. M. Renwick (Hawick), D. I. Johnston (Watsonians), K. W. Robertson (Melrose), R. Wilson (London Scottish), R. J. Laidlaw (Jedforest); I. A. M. Paxton (Selkirk), A. J. Tomes (Hawick), W. Cuthbertson (Kilmarnock), D. G. Leslie (Gala), J. H. Calder (Stewart's-Melville F. P.), I. G. Milne (Heriot's F. P.), C. T. Deans (Hawick), J. Aitken (Gala). Romania: G. Florea, S. Fuicu, A. Lungu, I. Constantin, M. Aldea, D. Alexandru, M. Paraschiv (c); P. Bors, E. Stoica, G. Caragea, G. Dumitru, A. Radalescu, O. Corneliu, M. Munteanu, I. Bucan.

By scoring all of Scotland's points, Andy Irvine set a new record of 217 points in internationals for one country, surpassing Don Clarke's previous record of 207.

== Sources ==
- Vivian Jenkins, ed. (1982). Rothmans Rugby Yearbook 1982–83. Rothmans Publications Ltd. pp. 65–67. ISBN 0907574130.
