= 1987 Rugby World Cup statistics =

This article documents statistics from the 1987 Rugby World Cup, hosted by New Zealand and Australia from 22 May to 20 June.

== Team statistics ==
The following table shows the team's results in major statistical categories.

Team statistics
Team	Played	Won	Drawn	Lost	Points difference	Tries	Conversions	Penalties	Drop goals
New Zealand	6	6	0	0	246	43	30	21	1
Wales	6	5	0	1	22	20	11	5	3
Australia	6	4	0	2	78	26	20	12	2
France	6	4	1	1	102	34	26	8	1
England	4	2	0	2	55	15	11	7	0
Ireland	4	2	0	2	25	13	10	7	2
Scotland	4	2	1	1	39	22	16	6	0
Argentina	3	1	0	2	−41	4	3	9	0
Canada	3	1	0	2	−25	8	3	8	1
Fiji	4	1	0	3	−60	8	5	9	1
Italy	3	1	0	2	−70	5	1	4	2
Romania	3	1	0	2	−69	6	2	11	0
United States	3	1	0	2	−60	5	5	2	1
Japan	3	0	0	3	−75	7	1	5	1
Tonga	3	0	0	3	−69	3	1	5	0
Zimbabwe	3	0	0	3	−98	5	3	9	0

Source: ESPNscrum.com

== Top point scorers ==
Top 10 point scorers
Player	Team	Position	Played	Tries	Conversions	Penalties	Drop goals	Total points
Grant Fox	New Zealand	First five-eighth	6	0	30	21	1	126
Michael Lynagh	Australia	Fly-half	6	0	20	12	2	82
Gavin Hastings	Scotland	Fullback	4	3	16	6	0	62
Didier Camberabero	France	Fly-half	5	4	14	3	0	53
Jonathan Webb	England	Fullback	4	0	11	7	0	43
Guy Laporte	France	Fly-half	3	2	11	3	1	42
Paul Thorburn	Wales	Fullback	6	0	11	5	0	37
Mike Kiernan	Ireland	Centre	3	1	7	5	1	36
Severo Koroduadua	Fiji	Fullback	4	0	4	9	0	35
Hugo Porta	Argentina	Fly-half	3	0	3	9	0	33

== Top try scorers ==
Top 10 try scorers
Player	Team	Position	Played	Tries	Conv	Penalties	Drop goals	Total points
Craig Green	New Zealand	Wing	5	6	0	0	0	24
John Kirwan	New Zealand	Wing	6	6	0	0	0	24
Alan Whetton	New Zealand	Flanker	6	5	0	0	0	20
David Kirk	New Zealand	Half-back	6	5	0	0	0	20
John Gallagher	New Zealand	Fullback	5	5	0	0	0	20
Matthew Burke	Australia	Wing	5	5	0	0	0	20
Mike Harrison	England	Wing	4	5	0	0	0	20
Alan Tait	Scotland	Centre	4	4	0	0	0	16
David Campese	Australia	Wing	6	4	0	0	0	16
Denis Charvet	France	Wing	6	4	0	0	0	16

== Hat-tricks ==
Unless otherwise noted, players in this list scored a hat-trick of tries.

No.	Player	For	Against	Stage	Result	Venue	Date
1	Craig Green^{T4}	New Zealand	Fiji	Pool	74–13	Lancaster Park, Christchurch	27 May 1987
2	John Gallagher^{T4}	New Zealand	Fiji	Pool	74–13	Lancaster Park, Christchurch	27 May 1987
3	Glen Webbe	Wales	Tonga	Pool	29–16	FMG Stadium, Palmerston North	29 May 1987
4	Mike Harrison	England	Japan	Pool	60–7	Concord Oval, Sydney	30 May 1987
5	John Jeffrey	Scotland	Romania	Pool	55–28	Carisbrook, Dunedin	2 June 1987
6	Didier Camberabero	France	Zimbabwe	Pool	70–12	Eden Park, Auckland	2 June 1987
7	Rodolphe Modin	France	Zimbabwe	Pool	70–12	Eden Park, Auckland	2 June 1987
8	Ieuan Evans^{T4}	Wales	Canada	Pool	40–9	Rugby Park Stadium, Invercargill	3 June 1987
9	Brendan Mullin	Ireland	Tonga	Pool	32–9	Ballymore Stadium, Brisbane	3 June 1987

Key
^{T4}	Scored four tries

== Stadiums ==
Stadium	City	Capacity	Matches played	Overall attendance	Average attendance per match	Average attendance as % of capacity	Tries scored	Avg. tries scored / match	Overall points scored	Avg. points scored / match
Eden Park	Auckland	48,000	5	92,535	18,507	38.56%	42	8.40	284	56.80
Athletic Park	Wellington	39,000	4	64,000	16,000	41.03%	29	7.25	228	57.00
Lancaster Park	Christchurch	36,500	4	75,000	18,750	51.37%	24	6.00	201	50.25
Carisbrook	Dunedin	35,000	3	36,000	12,000	34.29%	23	7.67	181	60.33
Rotorua International Stadium	Rotorua	35,000	1	29,000	29,000	82.86%	5	5.00	43	43.00
McLean Park	Napier	30,000	1	7,000	7,000	23.33%	8	8.00	41	41.00
Rugby Park	Hamilton	30,000	1	13,000	13,000	43.33%	5	5.00	37	37.00
Rugby Park Stadium	Invercargill	30,000	1	14,000	14,000	46.67%	8	8.00	49	49.00
Ballymore Stadium	Brisbane	24,000	5	48,855	9,771	40.71%	32	6.40	213	42.60
Concord Oval	Sydney	20,000	6	72,483	12,081	60.41%	42	7.00	299	49.83
Showgrounds Oval	Palmerston North	20,000	1	19,000	19,000	95.00%	6	6.00	45	45.00
Total		1,032,000	32	478,449	14,952	46.36%	224	7.00	1,621	50.66

== See also ==
- 1991 Rugby World Cup statistics
- Records and statistics of the Rugby World Cup
- List of Rugby World Cup hat-tricks
