= Neville Kloppers =

Zimbabwean rugby union player

- Born: 1962 (age 63–64) Salisbury, South Rhodesia
- School: St. John's College

Rugby union career
- Position: Lock
Amateur team(s)
Years	Team	Apps	(Points)
19??-19??	Old Johnians RFC		
Provincial / State sides
Years	Team	Apps	(Points)
19??-19??	Mashonaland		
International career
Years	Team	Apps	(Points)
1987	Zimbabwe	1	(0)

Neville Kloppers (born c. 1962), is a Zimbabwean rugby union player who played as lock.

== Career ==
At club level, Kloppers played for Old Johnians RFC and for the Mashonaland provincial team alongside Andy Ferreira, Malcolm Jellicoe, Andre Buitendag, Dirk Buitendag, Alex Nicholls, who would play alongside him for Zimbabwe at the 1987 Rugby World Cup. His only international cap was during the pool match against France, in Auckland on 2 June 1987.
