= Andre Buitendag =

- Born: 16 February 1962 (age 64) South Rhodesia
- Height: 188 m (616 ft 10 in)
- Weight: 84 kg (185 lb)

Rugby union career
- Position: Centre
Provincial / State sides
Years	Team	Apps	(Points)
19??-19??	Mashonaland		
International career
Years	Team	Apps	(Points)
1987	Zimbabwe	2	(0)

Andre Buitendag (born 26 February 1962), is a Zimbabwean rugby union player who played as centre.

== Career ==
At club level, Buitendag for the Mashonaland provincial team alongside Andy Ferreira, Malcolm Jellicoe, Neville Kloppers, Dirk Buitendag, Alex Nicholls, who would play alongside him for Zimbabwe at the 1987 Rugby World Cup. Buitendag represented Zimbabwe at the 1987 Rugby World Cup, playing the pool stage matches against Romania and Scotland.
