= Dirk Buitendag =

Zimbabwean rugby union player (born 1960)

- Born: 6 April 1960 (age 66) Southern Rhodesia
- Height: 6 ft 2 in (188 cm)
- Weight: 207 lb (94 kg)

Rugby union career
- Position: Flanker
Provincial / State sides
Years	Team	Apps	(Points)
1985-1991	Mashonaland		
International career
Years	Team	Apps	(Points)
1987	Zimbabwe	14	(4)

Dirk Buitendag (born 6 April 1960), is a Zimbabwean rugby union player who played as flanker.

== Career ==
At club level, Buitendag played for Old Johnians RFC and for the Mashonaland provincial team alongside Andy Ferreira, Malcolm Jellicoe, Andre Buitendag, Neville Kloppers, Alex Nicholls, who would play alongside him for Zimbabwe at the 1987 Rugby World Cup. He represented Zimbabwe at the 1987 Rugby World Cup, where he played all the pool stage matches, scoring a try against Scotland. He also played for the University of Wollongong rugby union team.
