= Emilian Grigore =

Romanian rugby union player (born 1957)

- Born: Emilian Grigore; 1957 (age 68–69) Romania

Rugby union career
- Position: Hooker
Senior career
| Years | Team | Apps | (Points) |
| 19??-19?? | RCJ Farul Constanța | | |
International career
| Years | Team | Apps | (Points) |
| 1982–1987 | Romania | 2 | (0) |

Emilian Grigore (born circa 1957) is a former Romanian rugby union football player. He played as hooker.

== Club career ==
Grigore played for RCJ Farul Constanța, with which he won a Masters tournament in France alongside Romeo Bezuscu, Florea Opris, Adrian Lungu and Vasile Ion.

== International career ==
Although being part of the Romania squad which toured Scotland in 1981, Grigore was first capped for Romania during the 1981-82 FIRA Trophy, during the match against West Germany in Bucharest, on 30 April 1982. He was also called up for the Romania team at the 1987 Rugby World Cup, playing all the three pool stage matches, with the match against Scotland being his last cap.

== Honours ==
Farul Constanța

- Cupa României: 1986-87
