= 1976–77 FIRA Trophy =

European rugby union championship

1976-77 FIRA Trophy
- Date: 17 October 1976 - 1 May 1977
- Countries: France; Italy; Romania; Morocco; Poland; Spain

Tournament statistics
- Champions: Romania
- Matches played: 15

The 1976-1977 FIRA Trophy was the 17th edition of a European rugby union championship for national teams.

The tournament was won by Romania, with a Grand Slam, which included a 15–12 win over France and a 69-0 trashing of Italy.

== First division ==
- Table

Place	Nation	Games				Points			Table points
Place	Nation	played	won	drawn	lost	for	against	difference	Table points
1	Romania	5	5	0	0	233	31	+202	15
2	France	5	4	0	1	145	48	+ 97	13
3	Spain	5	2	0	3	68	73	-5	9
4	Italy	5	2	0	3	58	96	-38	9
5	Poland	5	1	0	4	36	111	-75	7
6	Morocco	5	1	0	4	20	201	-181	7

Morocco were relegated to division 2 for the worst points difference.

- Results

Point system: try 4 pt, conversion: 2 pt., penalty kick 3 pt. drop 3 pt, goal from mark 3 pt.
Click "show" for more info about match (scorers, line-up etc.)

17 October 1976

Poland	8 - 38	Romania

Nowy Dwór

13 November 1976

Poland	13 - 7	Morocco

Sochzachew

14 November 1976	Romania	15 - 12	France	Stadionul Arcul de Triumf Bucharest
	Try: Dumitru, Murariu; Parschiv; Drop: Bucos		Try: Bastiat; Con: Aguirre; Pen: Aguirre 2	Referee: Jeff Kelleher (Wales)
Romania: 15.Mihai Bucos, 14.Petre Ianusevici, 13.Gheorghe Nica (cap.), 12.Vasile Varga, 11.Petre Motrescu, 10.Alexandru Dumitru, 9.Mircea Paraschiv, 8.Gheorghe Daraban, 7.Enciu Stoica, 6.Florică Murariu, 5.Marin Ionescu, 4.I. Pintea, 3.Constantin Dinu, 2.Mircea Ortelecan, 1.Nicolae Baciu				Referee: Jeff Kelleher (Wales)
France: 15.Jean-Michel Aguirre, 14.Dominique Harize, 13.Roland Bertranne, 12.François Sangalli, 11.Jean-Luc Averous, 10.Jean-Pierre Pesteil, 9.Richard Astre (cap.), 8.Jean-Pierre Bastiat, 7.Jean-Claude Skrela, 6.Jean-Pierre Rives, 5.Guy Gasparotto, 4.Gerard Cholley, 3.Robert Paparemborde, 2.Alain Paco, 1.Armand Vaquerin

17 November 1976

Romania	89 - 0	Morocco

Bucharest

27 November 1976

Italy	17 - 4	Spain

Stadio Flaminio, Rome

5 December 1976

France A1	28 - 21	Spain

Parc des Sports d'Ondarraitz, Hendaye

6 February 1977

France A1	10 - 3	Italy

Stade Lesdiguières, Grenoble

20 February 1977	Spain	21 - 3	Morocco	Centro Deportivo Municipal Aluche, Madrid
	Try: Torres; Fernandez Gijón; Alvarez Cienfuegos; Con: Moriche; Pen: Apraiz
Spain: 15.José Ramón Apraiz Feliu, 14.José Luis Cruz López, 13.Salvador Torres, 12.Eduardo Fernández Gijón, 11.José Luis Ruiz Cristín, 10.Manolo Moriche, 9.Andrés Zulet Artegui, 8.José Maria Epalza (cap.), 7.Carlos Romero Moreno, 6.Tomás Pardo, 5.Carlos Rodríguez García, 4.Ignacio Álvarez Cienfuegos, 3.Joaquín Uría, 2. Gabriel Zapiain, 1.Antonio Martín Sánchez; Replacements: Carlos Romero Moreno

6 March 1977

Morocco	10 - 9	Italy

Casablanca

20 March 1977

Morocco	0 - 69	France A1

Casablanca

2 April 1977

Italy	29 - 3	Poland

Stadio Santa Maria Goretti, Catania

17 April 1977

Spain	11 - 3	Poland

Estadio Nacional Complutense, Madrid

24 April 1977

Spain	11 - 22	Romania

Estadi Baldiri Aleu, Sant Boi de Llobregat

1 May 1977	Romania	69 - 0	Italy	Stadionul Dinamo, Bucharest
	Try: Motrescu 4, Stoica 2 Daraban,, Murariu; Nica, Ortelecan, Con: Bucos 5, Nica 4 Pen: Alexandru			Referee: R.Quintentonn (England)
Romania: 15.Mihai Bucos, 14.Ion Constantin, 13.Gheorghie Nica, 12.Vasile Varga, 11.Petre Motrescu, 10.Alexandru Dumitru, 9.Mircea Paraschiv, 8.Florica Murariu, 7.Gheorghie Daraban, 6.Enciu Stoica, 5.I. Pintea, 4.Marin Ionescu, 3.Iancu Bacioiu, 2.Mircea Ortelecan, 1.Constantin Dinu - replacements: 16.Eduard Suciu				Referee: R.Quintentonn (England)
Italy: 15.Fabrizio Gaetaniello, 14.Manrico Marchetto, 13.Nello Francescato, 12.Fiorenzo Blessano, 11.Serafino Ghizzoni, 10.Ennio Ponzi, 9.Agostino Puppo, 8.Antonio Rocca, 7.Loris Salsi, 6.Narciso Zanella, 5.Adriano Fedrigo (cap.), 4.Andrea Rinaldo, 3.Mario Piovan, 2.Pietro Monfeli, 1.Fulvio di Carlo - replacements: 16.Carlo Casagrande

1 July 1977

Poland	9 - 26	France A1

Warsaw

== Second Division ==
- Table

Place	Nation	Games				Points			Table points
Place	Nation	played	won	drawn	lost	for	against	difference	Table points
1	Czechoslovakia	4	4	0	0	90	31	+59	12
2	Soviet Union	4	3	0	1	106	25	+81	10
3	West Germany	4	1	1	2	67	66	+ 1	7
4	Sweden	4	0	0	4	24	188	-164	4
DQ	Netherlands	4	1	1	2	54	31	23	6

Czechoslovakia promoted in Division 1; Netherlands disqualified for no-show

- Results

10 October 1976

Netherlands	34 - 3	Sweden

Sportpark Berestein, Hilversum

17 October 1976

Czechoslovakia	9 - 6	Soviet Union

Říčany

6 November 1976

Czechoslovakia	22 - 6	Germany

Říčany

21 November 1976

Germany	13 - 13	Netherlands

Hanover

30 October 1976

Soviet Union	72 - 0	Sweden

Tbilisi

17 April 1977

Netherlands	7 - 9	Czechoslovakia

Hilversum

8 May 1977

Sweden	9 - 32	Germany

Stockholm

21 May 1977

Sweden	12 - 50	Czechoslovakia

Gothenburg

17 April 1977

Germany	16 - 22	Soviet Union

Hanover

30 April 1977

Soviet Union	6 – 0 Netherlands withdraw	Netherlands

Sochi

== Third Division ==
- Table

Place	Nation	Games				Points			Table points
Place	Nation	played	won	drawn	lost	for	against	difference	Table points
1	Belgium	3	3	0	0	57	25	+32	9
2	Switzerland	3	1	0	2	29	47	-18	5
3	Yugoslavia	2	1	0	1	24	14	+10	4
4	Luxembourg	2	0	0	2	7	31	-24	2

- Results

8 December 1976

Belgium	8 - 6	Yugoslavia

Brussels

11 December 1976

Switzerland	6 - 18	Yugoslavia

Lausanne

16 April 1977

Switzerland	16 - 25	Belgium

Lausanne

27 April 1977

Belgium	24 - 3	Luxembourg

Brussels

14 May 1977

Luxembourg	4 - 7	Switzerland

Luxembourg

Yugoslavia	NOT PLAYED	Luxembourg

== Bibliography ==
- (in Italian) Francesco Volpe, Valerio Vecchiarelli (2000), 2000 Italia in Meta, Storia della nazionale italiana di rugby dagli albori al Sei Nazioni, GS Editore (2000) ISBN 88-87374-40-6.
- (in Italian) Francesco Volpe, Paolo Pacitti (Author), Rugby 2000, GTE Gruppo Editorale (1999).
