= Kerry Fitzgerald =

Australian rugby union referee

- Born: Kerry Victor Joseph; 1948
- Died: 18 December 1991 (aged 43)

Rugby union career
Refereeing career
Years	Competition	Apps
1987, 1991	Rugby World Cup	4, 3
1984-1991	Test Matches	26

Kerry Victor Joseph Fitzgerald (c. 1948 – 18 December 1991) was an Australian rugby union referee best known for officiating in the 1987 Rugby World Cup Final, the first ever Rugby World Cup final.

== Refereeing career ==
Fitzgerald took up refereeing in 1977. In 1984 he made his international debut in the unofficial test between the All Blacks and Fiji in Suva.

For the first Rugby World Cup in 1987 he was one of two Australian referees selected, the other being Bob Fordham. Fitzgerald refereed pool matches between the England and the United States and Ireland verses Wales. In the semi-final between New Zealand and Wales, The Welsh player Huw Richards was elbowed in the head by Gary Whetton, who he then punched before being knocked out by Buck Shelford. After Richards regained consciousness, Fitzgerald issued him the first red card of the tournament. Fitzgerald, went on to referee the World Cup Final.

In his career Fitzgerald refereed 26 tests, including the semi-final between England and Scotland in the 1991 Rugby World Cup, just 6 weeks before his death.

== Death ==
Fitzgerald collapsed and died in his office on 18 December 1991.
