= Yugoslavia national rugby union team =

SFR Yugoslavia
- Union: Ragbi Savez Jugoslavije
- Nickname: Plavi
- Most caps: Nikola Stancevic (44)
- Top scorer: Nasir Vehabovic (48)
Team kit	Change kit

First international
- Romania 11–3 Yugoslavia (31 July 1968)

Largest win
- Yugoslavia 46–4 Denmark (15 May 1982)

Largest defeat
- Yugoslavia 6–86 France (20 September 1979)

The Yugoslavia national rugby union team used to represent Yugoslavia at Rugby union until the 1990s.

== History ==
SFR Yugoslavia made their debut as early as 1968 against a Romanian XV, losing 3 points to 11 in World Youth Sports Games in Stara Zagora (Bulgaria). They made their full Test debut on 29.December 1968, in FIRA competition against Italy. Till the 1991 SFR Yugoslavia national rugby team played in total 66 Test games and regularly participated in FIRA Nations Cup and FIRA Trophy. The last game SFR Yugoslavia played in April 1991 against Czechoslovakia and won the first time against this opponent.

The best result SFR Yugoslavia gained in season 1979–1980. After wins against The Netherlands and Sweden, drawn against West Germany and defeat versus Spain SFR Yugoslavia finished second in B group, eight in total ranking in FIRA competition.

National managers were Branimir Alaupovic from Zagreb (twice), Mihovil Radja from Split, Dusan Novakov from Pancevo, Marko Protega from Split and Suad Kapetanovic from Zenica.

Yugoslavia affiliated to the IRB in 1988 and played in the 1988 World Cup qualification.

Due to the links between many Yugoslav and New Zealand families, the side also toured there.

== Notable players ==
The longest serving and the most capped players were Nikola Stancevic and Dragan Kesic from Dinamo Pancevo, Ante Zekan, Branko Radic, Damir Buzov and Vinko Labrovic from Nada Split, Tihomir Vranesevic and Dubravko Gerovac from Zagreb, Damir Uzunovic, Sreto Cadjo, Nasir Vehabovic and Jasmin Deljkic from Celik Zenica, Drago Lulic from Energoinvest Makarska, Zlatko Zver from Koloys LJubljana, Dragan Grujic from Partizan Belgrade.

In the second half of the 1980s, many SFR Yugoslavia representatives came to France to play rugby as semi-pro players in lower-level clubs. Drago Lulic from RK Energoinvest Makarska was the first, joining Montchanin in 1986. In 1987, Midi-Olympique rugby magazine voted Lulic as The Player of the Month for November. Lulic was also voted twice as Player of the week. In the 1987–1988 season, Damir Uzunovic, Ibrahim Hasagic and Pero Barisic joined Lulic at Montchanin Rugby Sportif. Lulic later played for Union Sportive Bourg-en-Bresse and Rhone-Alpes and finished his career in 1996 with Lons les Saunier.

Damir Dimitrijevic, Nikola Scepanovic, Renato Jukic and Muharem Gafurovic played for RC Dijon. Jasmin Deljkic played for Chalon Rugby. Pavle Grubisic, Vinko Labrovic and Dusan Jerotijevic for Plaisir Rugby. Boro Karaman played for Union Sportive Bourg-en-Bresse.

The highest individual achievement was by Dzoni Mandic, a 1.95 m and 110 kg, lock/backrow player. After a couple seasons in Club Olympique Creusot Bourgogne he joined Grenoble and in 1993 he played in the finale of the French Rugby Championship. He later played for Nice Rugby Club also.

== Successor teams ==
The rugby teams of Yugoslavia's successor states have had varying success, but none have yet qualified for the World Cup.

== Test games ==
Date	Venue	Opposition	Result	Tournament
31.07.1968.	Stara Zagora	RomaniaXV	3–11	World Youth Games
02.08.1968.	Stara Zagora	Bulgaria	6–29	World Youth Games
29.12.1968.	San Dona di Piave	Italy	3–22	1968–1969 FIRA Nations Cup
01.05.1969.	PANCEVO	Bulgaria	22–6	1968–1969 FIRA Nations Cup
21.12.1969.	Madrid	Spain	3–14	1969–1970 FIRA Nations Cup
05.04.1970.	S.PALANKA	Poland	12–9	1969–1970 FIRA Nations Cup
18.10.1970.	SISAK	Poland	19–15	Friendly
24.10.1970.	Havirov	Czechoslovakia	3–19	1970–1971 FIRA Nations Cup
29.11.1970.	ZAGREB	Czechoslovakia	0–9	1970–1971 FIRA Nations Cup
05.12.1971.	Madrid	Spain	4–26	1971–1972 FIRA Nations Cup
30.04.1972.	SPLIT	Spain	7–21	1971–1972 FIRA Nations Cup
15.11.1972.	Brussels	Belgium	0–3	Friendly
19.11.1972.	Hague	Netherlands	3–9	Friendly
26.11.1972.	Aosta	Italy	12–13	1972–1973 FIRA Nations Cup
08.04.1973.	MAKARSKA	Portugal	3–3	1972–1973 FIRA Nations Cup
21.10.1973.	Prague	Czechoslovakia	3–32	1973–1974 FIRA Trophy – Group B
11.11.1973.	ZAGREB	Italy	7–25	1973–1974 FIRA Trophy – Group B
01.05.1974.	MAKARSKA	West Germany	8–20	1973–1974 FIRA Trophy – Group B
26.10.1975.	Gottwaldov	Czechoslovakia	3–28	1975–1976 FIRA Trophy – Group B
25.04.1976.	SPLIT	Switzerland	31–4	1975–1976 FIRA Trophy – Group B
08.12.1976.	Brussels	Belgium	6–8	1976–1977 FIRA Trophy – Group B
11.12.1976.	Lausanne	Switzerland	18–6	1976–1977 FIRA Trophy – Group B
14.05.1978.	SARAJEVO	Soviet Union	3–18	1977–1978 FIRA Trophy
18.05.1978.	TRAVNIK	Soviet Union	6–16	1977–1978 FIRA Trophy
15.10.1978.	Enkoping	Sweden	7–3	1978–1979 FIRA Trophy – Group B
02.12.1978.	SPLIT	Netherlands	11–30	1978–1979 FIRA Trophy – Group B
16.09.1979.	SPLIT	Tunisia	23–0	Mediterranean Games
20.09.1979.	SPLIT	France	6–86	Mediterranean Games
22.09.1979.	SPLIT	Morocco	7–22	Mediterranean Games
17.11.1979.	SPLIT	RomaniaXV	6–32	25th Anniversary of Yugoslavia RU
16.12.1979.	LJUBLJANA	Netherlands	10–6	1979–1980 FIRA Trophy – Group B
22.12.1979.	Madrid	Spain	3–25	1979–1980 FIRA Trophy – Group B
03.05.1980.	Hannover	West Germany	6–6	1979–1980 FIRA Trophy – Group B
17.05.1980.	SPLIT	Sweden	14–4	1979–1980 FIRA Trophy – Group B
30.11.1980.	KARDELJEVO	West Germany	0–16	1980–1981 FIRA Trophy – Group B
14.12.1980.	Hilversum	Netherlands	0–17	1980–1981 FIRA Trophy – Group B
25.04.1981.	SPLIT	Morocco	0–13	1980–1981 FIRA Trophy – Group B
27.11.1981.	Lausanne	Switzerland	10–0	1981–1982 FIRA Trophy Third division
29.11.1981.	Liege	Belgium	0–9	1981–1982 FIRA Trophy Third division
08.05.1982.	LJUBLJANA	Sweden	9–17	1981–1982 FIRA Trophy Third division
15.05.1982.	ZENICA	Denmark	46–4	1981–1982 FIRA Trophy Third division
18.09.1982.	SPLIT	Tunisia	4–0	Friendly
14.11.1982.	Prague	Czechoslovakia	9–17	1982–1983 FIRA Trophy Third division
27.11.1982.	SPLIT	Switzerland	36–19	1982–1983 FIRA Trophy Third division
30.04.1983.	LJUBLJANA	Belgium	23–3	1982–1983 FIRA Trophy Third division
14.05.1983.	Tunis	Tunisia	6–41	1982–1983 FIRA Trophy Third division
05.11.1983.	SPLIT	Czechoslovakia	16–20	1983–1984 FIRA Trophy Pool B
13.11.1983.	Hannover	West Germany	0–38	1983–1984 FIRA Trophy Pool B
05.05.1984.	SPLIT	Tunisia	12–22	1983–1984 FIRA Trophy Pool B
07.12.1985.	ZENICA	Switzerland	13–6	FIRA Grp C
25.05.1986.	Pernik	Bulgaria	4–10	FIRA Grp C
16.11.1986.	Geneve	Switzerland	4–3	FIRA Grp C
10.05.1987.	VRANJE	Bulgaria	32–15	FIRA Grp C
29.11.1987.	SPLIT	West Germany	6–15	1987–1989 FIRA Trophy – Group B2
14.04.1988.	Liege	Belgium	11–18	1987–1989 FIRA Trophy – Group B2
16.04.1988.	Hilversum	Netherlands	10–31	1987–1989 FIRA Trophy – Group B2
08.05.1988.	SPLIT	Portugal	9–22	1987–1989 FIRA Trophy – Group B2
13.11.1988.	SPLIT	Belgium	4- 31	1987–1989 FIRA Trophy – Group B2
20.11.1988.	Hannover	West Germany	6–29	1987–1989 FIRA Trophy – Group B2
27.11.1988.	SPLIT	Netherlands	6–0	1987–1989 FIRA Trophy – Group B2
22.04.1989.	Lousa	Portugal	9–13	1987–1989 FIRA Trophy – Group B2
09.09.1989.	Vyskov	Czechoslovakia	6–23	WCQ Europe
13.05.1990.	Luxembourg	Luxembourg	28–6	1989–1990 FIRA Trophy Third division
26.05.1990.	SPLIT	Andorra	3–9	1989–1990 FIRA Trophy Third division
11.11.1990.	Kostinbrod	Bulgaria	0–3	1990–1992 FIRA Trophy
21.04.1991.	BEOGRAD	Czechoslovakia	22–6	1990–1992 FIRA Trophy

In total 66 test games (20 won, 2 drawn, 44 lost)

== Overall ==
Below is a table of the representative rugby matches played by a Yugoslavia national XV at test level up until 11 May 2002, updated after match with Slovenia.

Nation	Games	Won	Lost	Drawn	Percentage of wins
Andorra	4	2	2	0	50%
Austria	1	1	0	0	100%
Belgium	7	1	6	0	14.29%
Bosnia and Herzegovina	1	0	1	0	0%
Bulgaria	7	5	2	0	71.43%
Czechoslovakia	8	1	7	0	12.5%
Denmark	1	1	0	0	100%
France A	1	0	1	0	0%
Hungary	1	1	0	0	100%
Israel	3	3	0	0	100%
Italy	3	0	3	0	0%
Lithuania	1	1	0	0	100%
Luxembourg	1	1	0	0	100%
Moldova	2	1	1	0	50%
Morocco	2	0	2	0	0%
Netherlands	6	2	4	0	33.33%
Poland	2	2	0	0	100%
Portugal	3	0	2	1	0%
Romania A	2	0	2	0	0%
Slovenia	1	1	0	0	100%
Soviet Union	2	0	2	0	0%
Spain	4	0	4	0	0%
Sweden	3	2	1	0	66.67%
Switzerland	9	8	1	0	88.89%
Tunisia	5	2	3	0	40%
Ukraine	1	0	1	0	0%
West Germany	6	0	5	1	0%
Total	87	35	50	2	40.23%

== SFR Yugoslavia XV (unofficial games) ==
Date	Venue	Opposition	Result	Tournament
30.11.1968.	SPLIT	CzechoslovakiaXV	10–12	Friendly
31.12.1968.	Rovigo	Northern Italy	9–19	
22.11.1972.	Koeln	Nord Rhein (GER)	46–3	
24.10.1974.	ZAGREB	Waitemata Rugby Club (NZL)	3–33	
25.11.1977.	Timișoara	RC Universitatea Timișoara (ROM)	0–4	
27.11.1977.	Timișoara	Timișoara Selection (ROM)	19–0	
29.11.1977.	Timișoara	RC Elektrotemis (ROM)	22–06	
26.02.1978.	ZAGREB	NZL Yugoslav Rugby Club (NZL)	0–10	
08.09.1978.	KASTEL STARI	University of Victoria (CAN)	9–16	
10.09.1978.	MAKARSKA	RC Universitatea Timișoara (ROM)	7–23	
12.09.1978.	SINJ	RC Universitatea Timișoara (ROM)	19–03	
30.09.1978.	BEOGRAD	RC Partizan	48–3	
03.10.1980.	PANCEVO	RC Valencia (ESP)	15–20	Kup oslobodjenja Panceva
05.10.1980.	PANCEVO	Yugoslavia U23	58–6	Kup oslobodjenja Panceva
18.10.1980.	BEOGRAD	Hrvatska	10–24	Kup oslobodjenja Beograda
19.10.1980.	BEOGRAD	Ljubljana	30–10	Kup oslobodjenja Beograda
09.04.1982.	SIBENIK	London Scottish RFC U23 (ENG)	21–12	
15.10.1983.	BEOGRAD	Beograd	40–4	
15.05.1984.	SPLIT	Middlesex County Clubs (ENG)	0–36	
21.10.1984.	BEOGRAD	Beograd	48–4	Kup oslobođenja Beograda
22.10.1984.	BEOGRAD	RC Stiinta Baia Mare (ROM)	8–12	Kup oslobođenja Beograda
20.10.1985.	BEOGRAD	Beograd	40–0	Kup oslobođenja Beograda
21.10.1985.	BEOGRAD	RC Stiinta Baia Mare (ROM)	10–26	Kup oslobođenja Beograda
05.12.1985.	Pordenone	Northern Italy	6–10	
16.10.1986.	SPLIT	NZ YUG Sports Club (NZL)	3–43	
13.03.1988.	SPLIT	Dalmacija XV	23–14	
20.03.1988.	PALIC	Srbija XV	60–3	
02.04.1988.	SINJ	RK Sinj	46–0	Cetinska krajina
03.04.1988.	SINJ	Becket Haus RFC (ENG)	13–0	Cetinska krajina
03.05.1988.	MAKARSKA	RK Energoinvest	47–4	
04.05.1988.	MAKARSKA	Selection Bourgogne (FRA)	13–13	
20.05.1988.	SPLIT	Surrey County Clubs (ENG)	6–32	
10.09.1988.	SPLIT	RK Nada II	80–0	Turnir povodom Dana mornarice
11.09.1988.	SPLIT	RK Nada	16–8	Turnir povodom Dana mornarice
01.10.1988.	PANCEVO	RK Nada	10–6	Kup oslobođenja Pančeva
02.10.1988.	PANCEVO	RK Partizan	8–4	Kup oslobođenja Pančeva
13.10.1988.	Crawley	North Sussex XV (ENG)	9–39	England Tour
16.10.1988.	Southand	Southand RFC (ENG)	9–13	England Tour
18.10.1988.	London	London Welsh RFC (ENG)	6–46	England Tour
20.10.1988.	Esher	Surrey County Clubs (ENG)	12–23	England Tour
26.03.1989.	SPLIT	Calder Vale RFC (ENG)	36–3	
17.04.1989.	Creusotin	Club Olimpique Creusotin (FRA)	9–10	France/Spain Tour
24.04.1989.	San Sebastian	Gipuzkoa XV (ESP)	36–3	France/Spain Tour
18.05.1989.	SPLIT	Old Emanuel RFC (ENG)	26–4	
03.06.1989.	ZAGREB	RK Mladost	82–9	
06.09.1989.	LJUBLJANA	RK Bežigrad	69–9	
06.05.1990.	Pontarlier	France Universitaire	19–42	France Tour
08.05.1990.	Digoin	Sel.Bourgogne (FRA)	7–24	France Tour
10.05.1990.	Plaisir	Plaisir Rugby Club (FRA)	21–18	France Tour
14.10.1990.	SPLIT	NZ YUG Sports Club (NZL)	0–30	

== Managers (Test games only) ==
Name	Period	Games	Wins	Draws	Lost	Win Ratio
Branko STIMAC	1968	3	0	0	3	0%
Branimir ALAUPOVIC	1969–1974	15	3	1	11	19,8 %
Mihovil RADJA	1975–1979	14	5	0	9	35,5 %
Dusan NOVAKOV	1980–1981	7	2	1	4	28,6 %
Suad KAPETANOVIC	1982	2	1	0	1	50,0 %
Branimir ALAUPOVIC	1982–1987	12	5	0	7	42,5 %
Marko PROTEGA	1987–1991	13	3	0	10	23,1 %

== Most capped players (Test games only) ==
Name	Club	Serving	Test Games	Points
Nikola STANCEVIC	RK Dinamo Pancevo	1973–1990	44	34
Dragan KESIC	RK Dinamo Pancevo	1968–1980	30	
Branko RADIC	RK Dinamo Pancevo	1968–1980	29	13
Tihomir VRANESEVIC	RK Sisak/RK Zagreb	1979–1990	29	16
Vinko LABROVIC	RK Nada Split	1980–1990	27	33
Nasir VEHABOVIC	RK Celik Zenica	1982–1991	22	48
Damir UZUNOVIC	RK Celik Zenica	1980–1991	22	12
Ante ZEKAN	RK Nada Split	1970–1981	20	8
Damir BUZOV	RK Nada Split	1979–1988	20	
Dusan PANIC	RK Zagreb	1979–1985	19	12
Jasmin DELJKIC	RK Celik Zenica	1982–1991	18	4
Ante STAGLICIC	RK Nada Split	1968–1974	17	5
Dubravko GEROVAC	RK Zagreb	1975–1982	16	28
Zlatko ZVER	RK Koloys LJubljana	1975–1981	16	
Sreto CADJO	RK Celik Zenica	1976–1982	16	4
Ranko ARMANDA	RK Nada Split	1968–1976	15	
Marko PROTEGA	RK Nada Split	1968–1973	15	
Goran TRKULJA	RK Zagreb	1978–1984	13	
Nikola TEPIC	RK Dinamo Pancevo	1983–1981	13	13
Ilija BJELANOVIC	RK Nada Split	1968–1979	13	3
Drago LULIC	RK Energoinvest Makarska	1978–1989	13	8
Tonci IVANISEVIC	RK Nada Split	1969–1975	12	8
Dragan GRUJIC	RK Partizan Beograd	1988–1991	12	8

=== ENC ===
The following successor teams are in the European Nations Cup:

- Bosnia and Herzegovina national rugby union team
- Croatia national rugby union team
- Serbia national rugby union team
- Slovenia national rugby union team
- Montenegro national rugby union team

== Bibliography ==
- Proslo je 30 godina, anniversary book, 1985, published by SFR Yugoslavia Rugby Union
- 20 godina Ragbi kluba Zagreb, 1984, published by RK Zagreb
- 10 godina ragbija na Makarskoj rivijeri 1968–1978, published by RK Energoinvest Makarska
- 50 godina Ragbi kluba Nada 1959–2009, published by RK Nada Split
