= Romeo Bezușcu =

Romanian rugby union player (born 1964)

- Born: Romeo Bezușcu; 1 July 1964 (age 62) Romania
- Height: 178 cm (5 ft 10 in)
- Weight: 76 kg (168 lb)

Rugby union career
- Position: Fly-half
Senior career
Years	Team	Apps	(Points)
19??-19??	RCJ Farul Constanța		
International career
Years	Team	Apps	(Points)
1985–1987	Romania	2	(12)

Romeo Bezușcu (born 1 July 1964) is a former Romanian rugby union football player. He played as a fly-half.

== Club career ==
Bezuscu played for RCJ Farul Constanța, with which he won a Masters tournament in France alongside Vasile Ion, Florea Opris, Adrian Lungu and Emilian Grigore.

== International career ==
Bezușcu earned 2 caps for Romania, from his debut in 1985 to his last game in 1987. He scored 4 penalties during his international career, 12 points on aggregate. He was a member of his national side for the 1st Rugby World Cup in 1987 and played in 1 group match in 1987 against France in which he scored all of his 12 career points.

== Honours ==
Farul Constanța

- Cupa României: 1986-87
