= Emilian Necula =

Romanian rugby union footballer

- Born: Emilian Necula; May 24, 1960 (age 66) Romania

Rugby union career
- Position: Number 8
Senior career
Years	Team	Apps	(Points)
1975-198?	Farul Constanța		
International career
Years	Team	Apps	(Points)
1987	Romania	2	(0)

Emilian Necula (born 24 May 1960), known also as Emil Necula is a Romanian former rugby union player. He played as Number 8. He is nicknamed Ene.

== Career ==
Necula's first cap for Romania was during the match against Italy in Constanta, on In the same year, he also was in the Romania team for 1987 Rugby World Cup, where he only played one match in the tournament, against France on 28 May 1987, in Wellington, which was his second and last international test cap. At club level, Necula played for Farul Constanța in Divizia Nationala, with which he won the 1974, 1975 and 1977 titles.

== Honours ==
Farul Constanța

- Cupa României: 1974-1975, 1975-1975, 1977-1978
