= Malcolm Sawyer =

Canadian rugby union player

- Born: 23 June 1959 (age 67) South Rhodesia

Rugby union career
- Position: Lock
International career
Years	Team	Apps	(Points)
1987	Zimbabwe	3	(0)

Malcolm Sawyer, erroneously reported as Tom Sawyer (born circa 23 June 1959) is a Zimbabwe former rugby union player. He played as lock. He played three matches at the 1987 Rugby World Cup.
