= Vasile Pașcu =

Romania international rugby union player

- Born: 8 February 1959 (age 67)

Rugby union career
- Position: Prop
Senior career
Years	Team	Apps	(Points)
1983–198?	Grivița Roșie		
198?1989	Dinamo București		
International career
Years	Team	Apps	(Points)
1983–1989	Romania	14	(0)

Vasile Pașcu (born circa 1959) is a Romanian former rugby union player. He played as prop.

== Career ==
His first cap for Romania was during the match against Italy in Buzău, on 10 April 1983. He was also part of the Romanian squad who beat Wales on 1983, at Stadionul 23 August, in Bucharest, where he was one of the two Grivița Roșie players in the squad, alongside Florin Măcăneață. Pașcu was also part of the 1987 Rugby World Cup Romania squad, but only played the match against France. His last cap was against Italy at Arena Civica, Milan on 2 April 1988.
