= Mihai Naca =

Romanian rugby union coach

- Born: 1939 Craiova, Romania
- Died: 26 June 2009 (aged 70) Constanta, Romania

Rugby union career
Coaching career
- Years: Team
- 1987–1989: Romania

Mihai Naca (1939 — 26 June 2009) was a Romanian rugby union coach. The stadium of ACS Tomitanii Constanța and the now disbanded RCJ Farul Constanța, on Primaverii Street, was named in his honour.

Born in Craiova, Naca spent his playing career with Rapid București, Gloria and Timişoara University, as a utility.

Naca became a coach in 1968 and is best known for his association with Farul Constanța, which he led to all six of the club's Liga Națională titles, between 1974 and 1997. His time with Farul Constanța included a run to the final of the 1986 Toulouse Masters. He was Romania's coach at the 1987 Rugby World Cup, where they came third in their group.
