= Ștefan Constantin =

Romania international rugby union player

- Born: 25 June 1959 (age 67)
- Height: 1.96 m (6 ft 5 in)
- Weight: 102 kg (225 lb; 16 st 1 lb)
- Notable relative: Laurențiu Constantin (brother)

Rugby union career
- Position: Lock
Senior career
Years	Team	Apps	(Points)
1978-1991	RCJ Farul Constanța		
1991-1994	USA Limoges		
International career
Years	Team	Apps	(Points)
1980-1987	Romania	16	(0)

Ștefan Constantin (born 25 June 1959 in Constanța) is a former Romanian rugby union player. He played as lock.

== Career ==
Grown in the RCJ Farul Constanța youth team, along with his older brother Laurențiu he formed a lock combination that was the backbone of the club and of the Romania national team throughout the decade, winning the national title with Farul in 1986.

His international debut was on 1980, during the FIRA Trophy in Constanța, during a 41–11 victory against Morocco and he was also called up for the Romania squad at the 1987 Rugby World Cup, where he played the last of his 18 international matches.

After his stint in Romania, he accepted Gheorghe Dumitru's proposal to play for USA Limoges, where Constantin played in the early 1990s.

Remaining in France, Constantin also was the talent scout for Limoges.
