= Vasile David =

Romania international rugby union player

- Born: Vasile David; 11 April 1961 (age 65) Romania

Rugby union career
- Position: Centre
Senior career
Years	Team	Apps	(Points)
1979-1995	CSA Steaua București		
International career
Years	Team	Apps	(Points)
1984–1992	Romania	9	(4)

Vasile David (born 11 April 1961) is a former Romanian rugby union football player. He played as a centre.

== Club career ==
At club level, he played for CSA Steaua București.

== International career ==
David was first capped for Romania during the 1985-1987 FIRA Trophy, during the match against Spain in Madrid, on 16 December 1984. He was also called up for the Romania team at the 1987 Rugby World Cup, playing two of the three pool stage matches. Although not being called up for the 1991 Rugby World Cup squad, he still played for Romania, with his last international cap being during the match against Soviet Union on 10 May 1992 in Bucharest.

== Honours ==
=== Team honours ===
Liga Națională de Rugby:

- CSA Steaua București:
  - Champion in 1979/80, 1980/81, 1982/83, 1983/84, 1984/85, 1986/87, 1987/88, 1988/89, 1991/92);
  - Runner up in 1985/86, 1989/90, 1992/93, 1994/95).

Romania

- FIRA Trophy:
  - Third place in 1985-87 and 1990-92

=== Individual honours ===
- Master of Sports of Romania in 1992
