= Richard Cramb =

Scottish rugby union player (1963–2025)

- Born: Richard Ian Cramb; 7 September 1963 Falkirk, Scotland
- Died: 22 December 2025 (aged 62)

Rugby union career
- Position: Fly-half
Amateur team(s)
Years	Team	Apps	(Points)
- Harlequins
- London Scottish
1995	Gosforth		
1996–2000	Tynedale RFC		
Provincial / State sides
Years	Team	Apps	(Points)
- Anglo-Scots
International career
Years	Team	Apps	(Points)
1985–1986	Scotland 'B'	2	
1987–1988	Scotland	4	

Richard Ian Cramb (7 September 1963 – 22 December 2025) was a Scottish international rugby union player who played for the national team.

== Rugby union career ==
=== Amateur career ===
Cramb played for Harlequins, before moving to London Scottish. He then played for Gosforth, before coaching at Newcastle, where he was the key mentor for Jonny Wilkinson.

=== Provincial career ===
Cramb played for Anglo-Scots District in the Scottish Inter-District Championship.

=== International career ===
Cramb played for Scotland 'B' twice; in 1985–1986, against Italy 'B' and France 'B'.

He made his full senior international debut in the group stages of the 1987 Rugby World Cup against Romania. He made four appearances in total for the Scotland.

Cramb went on the 1988 Scotland rugby union tour of Zimbabwe, although full caps were not awarded. His last appearance was against Australia at Murrayfield in 1988.

== Death ==
Cramb died from cancer on 22 December 2025 at the age of 62.
