= Laurențiu Constantin =

Romania international rugby union player

- Born: 12 June 1963 (age 63)
- Height: 6 ft 5 in (196 cm)
- Weight: 216 lb (98 kg)
- Notable relative: Ștefan Constantin (brother)

Rugby union career
- Position: Lock
Youth career
- 197?–1982: RCJ Farul Constanța
Senior career
| Years | Team | Apps | (Points) |
| 1982–1985 | CSA Steaua București | | |
| 1985–1986 | RCJ Farul Constanța | | |
| 1987–1988 | CSA Steaua București | | |
International career
| Years | Team | Apps | (Points) |
| 1983–1991 | Romania | 29 | (0) |

Laurențiu Constantin (born 12 July 1963 in Constanța) is a former Romanian rugby union player. He played as lock.

== Career ==
Grown in the RCJ Farul Constanța youth team, along with his younger brother Ștefan he formed a lock combination that was the backbone of the club and of the Romania national team throughout the decade, winning the national title with Farul in 1986. He was also part of the Steaua squad, with which he won 5 national championship titles in 1982, 1983, 1984, 1986 and 1987.

His international debut was on 1983, during the FIRA Trophy in Bucharest, against Soviet Union and he was also called up for the Romania squad at the 1987 Rugby World Cup, where he played the three matches. His last international cap was against France, in Bucharest, on 22 June 1991.
