= Vasile Ilcă =

- Born: Vasile Ilcă circa 1960 Romania

Rugby union career
- Position: Hooker
Senior career
Years	Team	Apps	(Points)
1981-1990	CS Universitatea Cluj-Napoca		
International career
Years	Team	Apps	(Points)
1987	Romania	1	(0)

Vasile Ilcă (born 1960) is a former Romanian rugby union player who played as hooker.

== Career ==
Between 1981 and 1994, Ilcă played the Divizia Nationala for CS Universitatea Cluj-Napoca. He was called up for the Romania squad for the 1987 Rugby World Cup, where he only played the match against France in Wellington on 28 May 1987, which was his only cap.
