= Vasile Ion =

Romanian rugby union player (born 1957)

- Born: Vasile Ion; 1 January 1957 (age 69) Romania

Rugby union career
- Position: Fullback
Senior career
Years	Team	Apps	(Points)
19??-19??	RCJ Farul Constanța		
International career
Years	Team	Apps	(Points)
1980–1987	Romania	2	(12)

Vasile Ion (born 1 January 1957) is a former Romanian rugby union football player. He played as a fullback.

== Club career ==
Ion played for RCJ Farul Constanța, with which he won a Masters tournament in France alongside Romeo Bezuscu, Florea Opris, Adrian Lungu and Emilian Grigore.

== International career ==
Ion was first capped for Romania during the 1979-80 FIRA Trophy, during the match against Morocco in Casablanca, on 30 April 1980. He was also called up for the Romania team at the 1987 Rugby World Cup, playing all the three pool stage matches, with the match against Scotland being his last cap, where he scored a penalty and converted a try.

== Honours ==
Farul Constanța

- Cupa României: 1986-87
