= Nicolae Vereș =

Romania international rugby union player

- Born: 1 July 1963 (age 63) Romania

Rugby union career
- Position: Lock
Senior career
Years	Team	Apps	(Points)
1986-1988	Dinamo București		
International career
Years	Team	Apps	(Points)
1986–1988	Romania	7	(0)

Nicolae Vereș (born 1 July 1963) is a former Romanian rugby union player who played as lock.

== Career ==
Vereș started his sporting career, when he was discovered by the Dinamo coach Gheorghe Drăgan. His first international cap for Romania was against Tunisia, in Constanța, on 5 October 1986. He was also part of the Romanian squad for the 1987 Rugby World Cup, where he played only the match against France at the Athletic Park, Wellington. His last cap for Romania was against USSR in Almaty, on 23 October 1988.
