= Matt Duncan =

Scotland international rugby union player

- Born: Matthew Dominic Fletcher Duncan; 29 August 1959 (age 67) Glasgow, Scotland

Rugby union career
- Position: Wing
Amateur team(s)
Years	Team	Apps	(Points)
- West of Scotland
Provincial / State sides
Years	Team	Apps	(Points)
- Glasgow District
International career
Years	Team	Apps	(Points)
1985–86	Scotland 'B'	2	
1986–89	Scotland	18	(28)

Matt Duncan (born 29 August 1959) is a former Scotland international rugby union player.

== Rugby Union career ==
=== Amateur career ===
At club level, he played on the wing for West of Scotland.

=== Provincial career ===
He played for Glasgow District. He was part of the famous 1989–90 squad that went unbeaten throughout the season; and won the Scottish Inter-District Championship.

=== International career ===
He was capped by Scotland 'B' twice in the period 1985–86.

His international debut came during the 1986 Five Nations Championship against France at Murrayfield. He went on to score in the following two games. He scored four tries at the 1987 Rugby World Cup. His final appearance was against Wales at Murrayfield in 1989.

He made 18 appearances for the Scotland.
