= Richard Tsimba =

Zimbabwean rugby union player (1965–2000)

- Born: Richard Utete Tsimba; July 9, 1965 Salisbury, Rhodesia
- Died: May 7, 2000 (aged 34)
- School: Peterhouse Boys' School

Rugby union career
- Position: Centre
Senior career
Years	Team	Apps	(Points)
1985-87	Chaminuka RFC		
1987-89	Belmont Shore RFC		
1990-95	Old Georgians RFC		
International career
Years	Team	Apps	(Points)
1987-1991	Zimbabwe	5	(12)

Richard Utete Tsimba (Salisbury, Rhodesia, 9 July 1965 – 30 April 2000) was a Zimbabwean rugby union player. He played as a centre. He was nicknamed "The Black Diamond".

Tsimba was the first black player to represent his country. He had 5 caps for Zimbabwe, scoring 3 tries, 12 points in aggregate. All his caps came at the Rugby World Cup. He played two games in the 1987 event, scoring two tries in the 21-20 loss to Romania on 23 March 1987 in Auckland. At the 1991 Rugby World Cup he was used in all three of Zimbabwe's games, scoring a try in the 52-8 loss to Japan on 14 October 1991 in Belfast.

He died in a car accident, aged only 34 years old. His wife, Cleopatra Tsimba and 3 daughters, Tadiwa Lucy, Rutendo Ashley and Nyasha Tina Tsimba surviving him.

On 25 October 2012, he was posthumously inducted into the IRB Hall of Fame; his living younger brother and fellow Zimbabwe international Kennedy Tsimba was inducted alongside him.
