= Derek Bevan =

Welsh rugby union referee (born 1947)

Derek Bevan MBE
- Born: William Derek Bevan; 19 June 1947 (age 79) Clydach, Wales
- Occupation: Rugby union referee

Rugby union career
Refereeing career
Years	Competition	Apps
1987–1999	Rugby World Cup	11
1984–2000	Test matches	44

William Derek Bevan (born 3 September 1947 in Clydach, Wales) is a Welsh international rugby union referee.

Bevan refereed his first international match on 22 April 1984, the 1983–84 FIRA Trophy match between Italy and Romania.

Bevan refereed a total of 11 Rugby World Cup games, beginning with two games at the inaugural Rugby World Cup in 1987 and three games at the 1991 Rugby World Cup, including the final between Australia and England.

At the 1995 Rugby World Cup in South Africa, Bevan was in charge of three matches, including the opening match of the tournament and the semi-final between hosts South Africa and France, and was one of the touch judges for the final. At a banquet held after the conclusion of the tournament, the president of the South African Rugby Union, Louis Luyt, described Bevan as "the most wonderful referee in the world" and "the outstanding referee in the World Cup" before attempting to present him with a gold watch estimated to be worth £1000 GBP. Bevan's response was to walk out along with the other officials present, and later said "'It was something I could have done without...It could be misconstrued, and if that is the case, it leaves a bitter taste." He refereed three games at the 1999 Rugby World Cup, hosted in his native Wales, including the semi-final between Australia and South Africa.

His final international appearance was in the 2000 Six Nations game between Ireland and Italy. Later that year, he was appointed Member of the Order of the British Empire (MBE) in the 2000 Birthday Honours. He held the Welsh record for number of international matches refereed until 2013, when Nigel Owens surpassed his total of 44 international games.

At club level, Bevan's career highlights include taking charge of the 1997 European Cup final between Brive and Leicester and refereeing the Welsh Cup final on four occasions.

Since his retirement from refereeing, Bevan has worked as a Television Match Official (TMO). His final game as a TMO was in May 2016.

Outside rugby, Bevan worked as a training officer for BP's chemicals division in Port Talbot.
