= Marcel Toader =

Romanian rugby union player (1963–2019)

- Toader in 2013
- Born: 4 January 1963 Cumpăna, Constanța County, Romania
- Died: 3 August 2019 (aged 56) Periș, Ilfov County, Romania
- Occupation: Businessman

Rugby union career
- Position: Wing
- Current team: retired
Senior career
Years	Team	Apps	(Points)
1983–1987	Steaua București		
International career
Years	Team	Apps	(Points)
1982–1990	Romania	30	(12)

Marcel Toader (4 January 1963 – 3 August 2019) was a Romanian rugby union player and a businessman and media personality. He played as a wing. He was usually considered one of the best Romanian rugby wings of all time.

== Club career ==
He played for Steaua București, from 1983/84 to 1986/87. He won the Romanian Rugby Championship three times in 1983/84, 1984/85 and 1986/87.

== International career ==
Toader gathered 30 caps for Romania, from his debut in 1982 to his last game in 1990. He scored 3 tries during his international career, 12 points on aggregate. He was a member of his national side for the first Rugby World Cup in 1987, scoring two tries during the tournament, against Zimbabwe and Scotland.

== Personal life and death ==
Toader was married to TV presenter Gabriela Cristea and then to singer Maria Constantin. He had one son.

Toader had a history of heart problems and suffered a heart attack in 2012. He died of a heart attack on 3 August 2019 at the age of 56.
