= Liviu Hodorcă =

Romania international rugby union player

- Born: Liviu Hodorcă; 1 July 1961 Romania
- Died: 19 June 2023 (aged 61)

Rugby union career
- Position(s): Fullback, wing
Senior career
Years	Team	Apps	(Points)
1983–1994	Steaua București		
International career
Years	Team	Apps	(Points)
1984–1988	Romania	11	(8)

Liviu Hodorcă (1 July 1961 – 19 June 2023) was a Romanian rugby union football player. He played as a fullback or as a wing.

== Club career ==
Liviu Hodorcă played for Steaua București and won the national championship six times and finishing as a runner-up three times.

== International career ==
Liviu Hodorcă earned 11 caps for Romania, from his debut in 1984 to his last game in 1988. He scored two tries during his international career, eight points on aggregate. He was a member of his national side for the 1st Rugby World Cup in 1987 and played in one group match in 1987 against Sables in which he scored four of his eight career points.

== Death ==
Hodorcă died on 19 June 2023, at the age of 61.

== Awards ==
Steaua București

- Six times Divizia Națională Champion: 1983–84, 1984–85, 1986–87, 1987–88, 1988–89, 1991–92
- Three times Divizia Națională Runner-Up: 1985–86, 1989–90, 1992–93
