= Rodolphe Modin =

France international rugby union player

- Born: March 26, 1959 (age 67) Gennevilliers, Paris
- Height: 1.77 m (5 ft 10 in)

Rugby union career
- Position: Scrum-half
Senior career
Years	Team	Apps	(Points)
1978–1991	CA Brive	213	
International career
Years	Team	Apps	(Points)
1987	France	1	(12)

Rodolphe Modin (born 26 March 1959 in Gennevilliers, Paris) is a former French international rugby union player. He played as a scrum-half.

As a youth, he played for CSM Gennevilliers and Racing Métro, with whom he won the under-19 national championship against a Biarritz Olympique team that included Serge Blanco. The following year he joined CA Brive as a senior player, where he made 213 appearances from 1978 to 1991.

Despite being selected for several touring parties of the France team, he made only one appearance, against Zimbabwe at the 1987 World Cup. He started the match and scored a hat-trick as France won 70–12.

Although he has a teaching degree in physical education, he has never taught. After his rugby-playing days were over he began a business career.
