= Alex Nicholls (rugby union) =

Zimbabwean rugby union footballer and coach

- Born: Alexander Herbert Nicholls; 26 June 1961 (age 65) Salisbury, South Rhodesia

Rugby union career
- Position: Prop
Provincial / State sides
| Years | Team | Apps | (Points) |
| 19??-19?? | Mashonaland | | |
International career
| Years | Team | Apps | (Points) |
| 1987-1991 | Zimbabwe | 4 | |

Alexander Herbert Nicholls (born Salisbury, 26 June 1961) is a Zimbabwean former rugby union player and coach. He played as prop.

== Playing career ==
At club level, he played for the Mashonaland provincial team. Nicholls also represented Zimbabwe at the 1987 and 1991 Rugby World Cups, with his first international cap being during the pool stage match against Scotland in Wellington, on 30 May 1987 and his last cap being during the match against Japan in Belfast, on 24 October 1991.

== Coaching career ==
Nichols was the caretaker coach of Zimbabwe in 1998. In 2004, he was appointed manager of the Zimbabwe under-19 national team replacing Patrick Gumunyu, after the then-coach Reg Querl was sacked. He also coached Old Hararians RFC.

== Personal life ==
He is the father of Joseph Nicholls and Ben Nicholls, the former being a player for Utah Warriors in the Major League Rugby and the second being a coach for Warriors Selects.
