= Ion Bucan =

Romanian former rugby union player

- Born: 27 January 1955 (age 71) Pașcani, Iași County, Romania
- School: Institutul de Mine, Petroșani (promoted in 1984)
- University: Gheorghe Asachi Technical University of Iași
- Occupation(s): Topographical engineer, Police Superior Officer (Police Commissioner at the Cluj County Police Inspectorate)

Rugby union career
- Position: Prop
Youth career
- 1970-1978: Politehnica Iași
Senior career
Years	Team	Apps	(Points)
1978-1984	Știința Petroșani		
1984-1989	Dinamo București		
International career
Years	Team	Apps	(Points)
1976–1988	Romania	46	(0)

Ion Bucan (born Pașcani, 27 January 1955), is a Romanian former rugby union player. He played as prop.

== Career ==
He first played in 1970, for Politehnica Iași, where he played until 1978, when he started to play for Știința Petroșani in the championship. Bucan later moved for Dinamo București in 1984. He debuted for Romania on 21 September 1976, against Bulgaria, in Burgas, during the 1976-77 FIRA Trophy. Bucan was also part of the Romania squad for the 1987 Rugby World Cup, where he played all three matches in the tournament. His last cap was against France, on 11 November 1987, in Agen.

== Honours ==
Știința Petroșani

- Cupa României: 1983

Dinamo București

- Cupa României: 1989

Romania

- FIRA Trophy: 1976-77, 1980-81 and 1982-83
