= Malcolm Jellicoe =

Zimbabwean rugby union player (born 1963)

- Born: Malcolm Jellicoe; May 26, 1963 (age 63) South Rhodesia
- Height: 176 m (577 ft 5 in)
- Weight: 75 kg (165 lb)

Rugby union career
- Position: Scrum-half
Provincial / State sides
Years	Team	Apps	(Points)
19??-19??	Mashonaland		
International career
Years	Team	Apps	(Points)
1987	Zimbabwe	3	(0)

Malcolm Jellicoe (born 29 May 1963) is a Zimbabwean former rugby union player who played as scrum-half.

== Career ==
Jellicoe first played for Zimbabwe in the 1987 Rugby World Cup, which he captained, playing all the three pool stage matches, without scoring any try. He retired from the international career after the tournament.
