= Guy Laporte =

French rugby union footballer and coach (1952–2022)

Guy Laporte (15 December 1952 – 28 January 2022) was a French rugby union player and a sports executive. He played as a fly-half.

== Career ==
Laporte was born in Beaufort, France. He first played for Sporting Club Rieumois, where he won the French 3rd Division in 1971–72. He then would play for SC Graulhet, from 1972–73 to 1987–88.

He had 16 caps, scoring three tries, 19 conversions, 23 penalties and eight drop goals, 143 points in aggregate, making him one of the top scorers for France in a short international career. He had his first cap for France at 7 February 1981, in a 19–13 win over Ireland, in Dublin, for the 1981 Five Nations Championship, in a game where he scored 2 penalties and two drop goals. He played only twice at the Five Nations Championship, in 1981, winning with a Grand Slam, and 1986, but scored one try, six conversions, 13 penalties and six drop goals, in an aggregate of 73 points. Laporte was called for the 1987 Rugby World Cup, where France was runners-up to New Zealand. He missed the final, but still played three games, scoring two tries, 11 conversions, three penalties and one drop goal, 42 points in aggregate, thus making him the top scorer for France in the competition. His last game was the 31–16 win over Fiji, at 7 June 1987, in Auckland, for the quarter-finals, where he scored three conversions, two penalties and one drop goal, an aggregate of 15 points.

Laporte, after finishing his career, was a member of the executive commission of the French Rugby Federation, and vice-president. He was later coach of Castres Olympique.

Laporte died of a heart attack at a hospital in Toulouse, France, on 28 January 2022, at the age of 69.
