= Philippe Dintrans =

France international rugby union player & entrepreneur

Philippe Dintrans (born 29 January 1957, in Tarbes) is a former French rugby union player and a current entrepreneur. He played as a hooker.

He played all his career at Tarbes Pyrénées Rugby, starting at 1967, aged 10 years old, and joining the first team in 1975/76, aged 18 years old, when he had his debut for the French Championship. He would play at Tarbes until 1991/92, for 17 seasons, with his best result being runners-up to the 1987/88 season, lost to SU Agen.

He had 50 caps for France, from 1979 to 1990, scoring 3 tries, 12 points on aggregate. He played in seven Five Nations Championship editions, in 1980, 1981, 1982, 1983, 1984, 1985 and 1989, winning it in 1981, with a Grand Slam, and in 1989. He played 24 games at the competition, scoring 1 try, 4 points on aggregate. He was called for the 1987 Rugby World Cup, playing in a single game, where he was the captain and remaining scoreless.

He was a Physical Education teacher for seven years and also has been involved in the gastronomical and automobile businesses.
