= Florică Murariu =

Romania international rugby union player

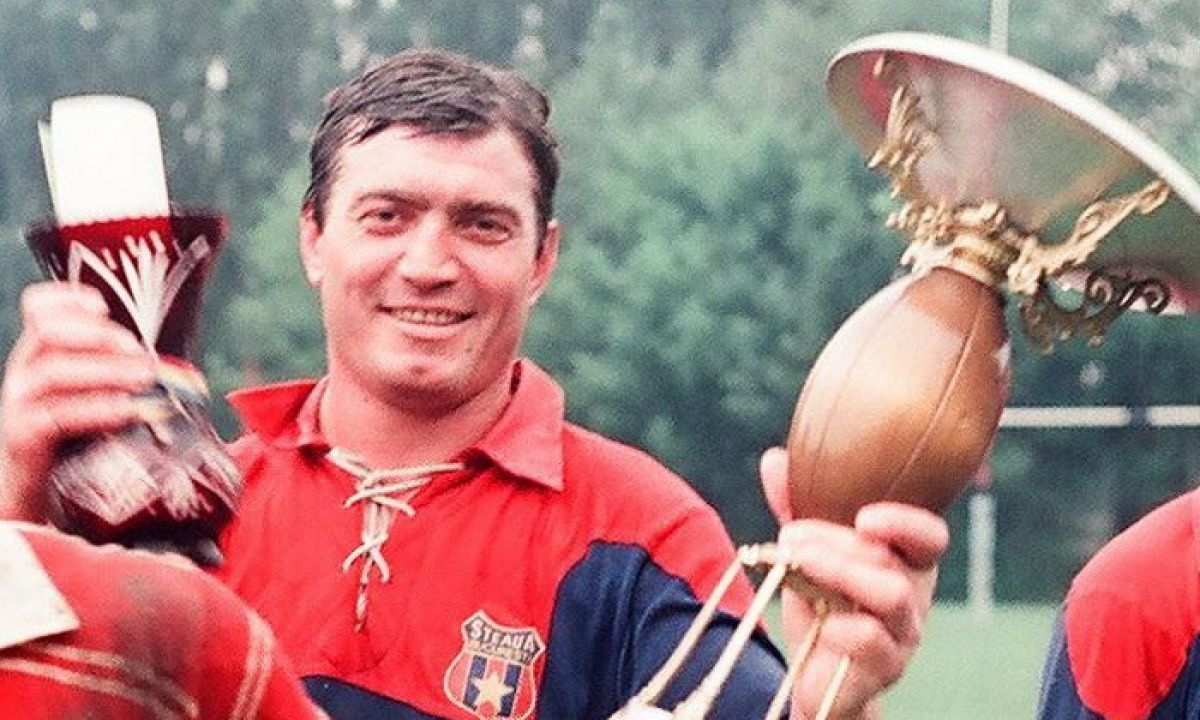
- Murariu with Steaua Bucharest
- Born: 28 March 1955 Mitoc, Botoșani, Romania
- Died: 24 December 1989 (aged 34) Bucharest, Romania

Rugby union career
- Position: Flanker
Senior career
Years	Team	Apps	(Points)
1974–1989	Steaua București		
International career
Years	Team	Apps	(Points)
1976–1989	Romania	69	(32)

Florică Murariu (28 March 1955 – 24 December 1989) was a Romanian professional rugby union flanker.

== Career ==
Murariu spent his entire career playing for Steaua Bucharest, where he won 10 league titles.

He won 69 caps for Romania, from 1976 to 1989, and scored 8 tries, 32 points on aggregate. He made his international debut against France on 14 November 1976. He captained his country for the first time on 12 April 1986 against France. He was called for the 1987 Rugby World Cup, playing in two games and scoring 2 tries, 8 points on aggregate. His final international appearance came against England on 13 May 1989.

Murariu was an officer in the Romanian Army and was shot dead at a roadblock during the 1989 Revolution.

== Honours ==
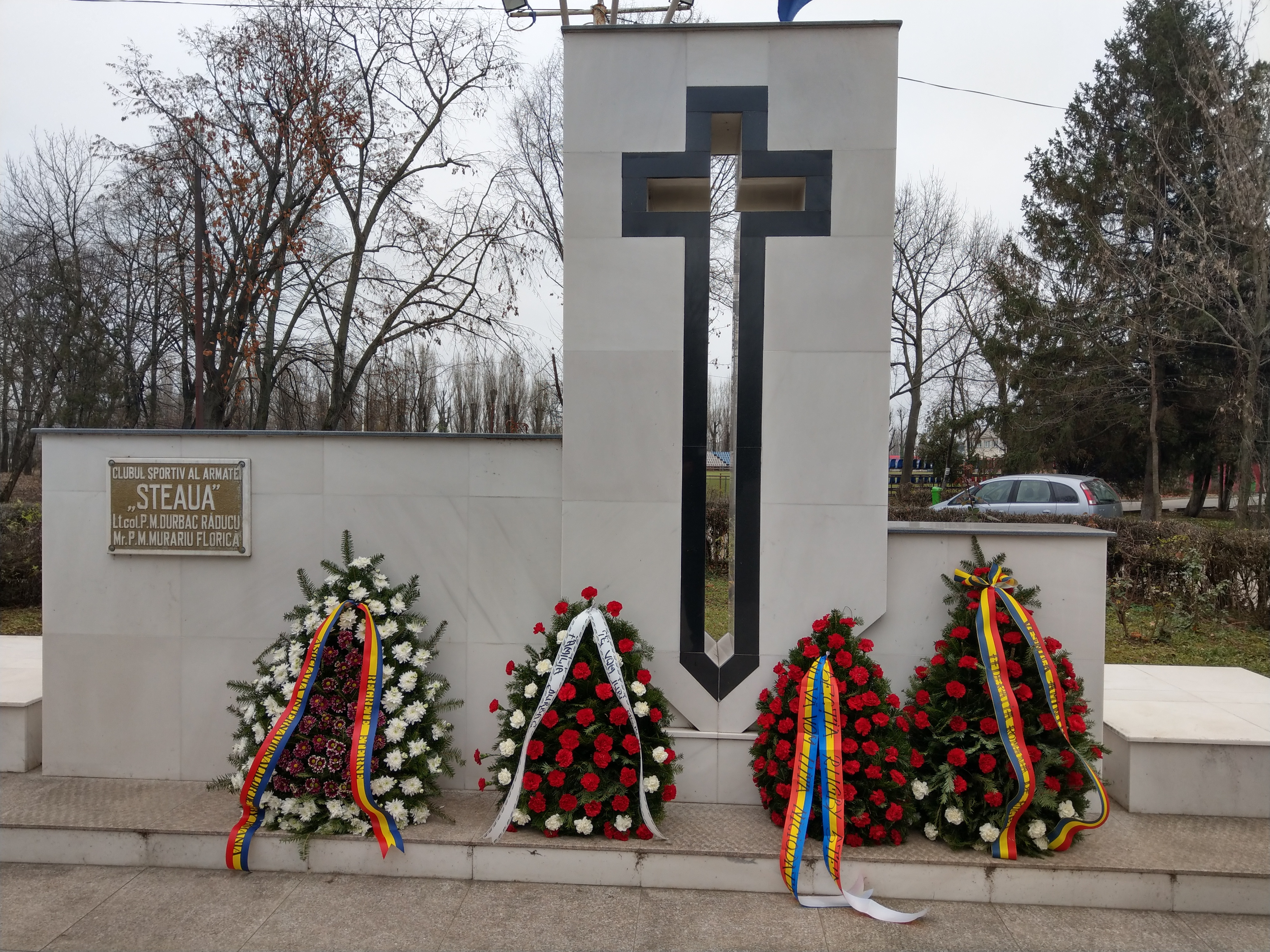
Memorial monument dedicated to Florică Murariu and Radu Durbac at the Steaua Sports Complex in Bucharest.

=== Club ===
Steaua Bucharest

- Romanian League:
  - Champion (10): 1977, 1979, 1980, 1981, 1983, 1984, 1985, 1987, 1988, 1989
- Cupa României:
  - Winner (2): 1977, 1978

=== International ===
Romania

- FIRA Nations Cup:
  - Winner (3): 1977, 1981, 1983
