= Andy Ferreira =

Zimbabwean rugby union footballer and coach

- Born: Andrew Meyer Ferreira; June 26, 1961 (age 65) Rusape, South Rhodesia
- Height: 172 cm (5 ft 8 in)
- Weight: 75 kg (165 lb)

Rugby union career
- Position: Fullback
Amateur team(s)
Years	Team	Apps	(Points)
1987-1993	Old Georgians RFC		
Provincial / State sides
Years	Team	Apps	(Points)
19??-19??	Mashonaland		
International career
Years	Team	Apps	(Points)
1983-1991	Zimbabwe	7	(54)
National sevens team
Years	Team		Comps
1992	Zimbabwe		

Andrew Meyer Ferreira (born 26 June 1961 in Rusape) is a Zimbabwean former rugby union player and coach. He played as fullback.

== Career ==
Ferreira's first cap for Zimbabwe was in the 1987 Rugby World Cup, where he played all the three pool stage matches against Romania, France and Scotland. He was also part of the 1991 Rugby World Cup squad, where he only played the match against Ireland, at Lansdowne Road, on 6 October 1991, which was his last cap for Zimbabwe.

== Coaching career ==
As coach, Ferreira coached Zimbabwe Sevens.
