= Didier Camberabero =

French rugby union player (born 1961)

- Born: 9 January 1961 (age 65) Valence, France
- Height: 5 ft 9 in (1.75 m)
- Weight: 153 lb (69 kg)

Rugby union career
- Position(s): Fly-half, Wing, Full-back
Senior career
Years	Team	Apps	(Points)
1980–1985	Valence		
1985–1993	Béziers		
1993–1995	Nîmes		
1995–1997	Grenoble		
1997–1998	Béziers		
1998–2000	Perpignan		
International career
Years	Team	Apps	(Points)
1982–1991	France	36	(354)

Didier Camberabero (born 9 January 1961), is a former French international rugby union player. He played as fly half.

== Biography ==
Camberabero is a son of the former international, Guy Camberabero, and the nephew of Lilian Camberabero, two brothers who took part in the first Grand Slam won by France. His brother, Gilles, is also an outstanding rugby player.

Camberabero is the seventh highest point scorer for the men's French international team, with 354 points in 36 test matches.

Camberabero previously set a world record for the highest number of points in a single match for a national team: 30, against Zimbabwe in 1987. This still stands as a French national record, although the world record has now been surpassed by Simon Culhane (45 points, against Japan in 1995).

With his father Guy, Camberabero is tied for the French record of the number of successful conversions in a match: 9 in 1987, against Zimbabwe.

He held the world record for the number of successful drop goals in a single match, 3 in 1990 until Jannie De Beer of South Africa broke this when he kicked 5 against England in the 1999 Rugby World Cup quarter final.

Camberabero felt the intrusion of the Cold War in the 1984 FIRA Championships. As a member of the French armed forces, the Polish rugby body tried to prevent him playing Poland, along with Henri Sanz and the Brive RFC centre Yves Fouget, because they were supposed to constitute a security risk to the Communist Regime.

== Statistics ==
- 36 caps for France, between 1982 and 1991
- Played in the final of the Rugby World Cup in 1987
- Winner of the Five Nations tournament in 1983

== Sources ==
- Cotton, Fran (Ed.) (1984) The Book of Rugby Disasters & Bizarre Records. Compiled by Chris Rhys. London. Century Publishing. ISBN 0-7126-0911-3
