= Jean-Luc Joinel =

French rugby union player (born 1953)

- Born: 21 September 1953 (age 73) Saint-Vincent-de-Cosse, France
- Height: 1.95 m (6 ft 5 in)
- Weight: 103 kg (227 lb)

Rugby union career
- Position: Flanker
Amateur team(s)
Years	Team	Apps	(Points)
1973-1988	CA Brive		
International career
Years	Team	Apps	(Points)
1977-1987	France	51	(0)
1980-1988	Barbarian RC	5	(10)

Jean-Luc Joinel (born 21 September 1953, in Saint-Vincent-de-Cosse) is a retired French international rugby union player. He played as a Flanker for CA Brive. He earned his first cap with the French national team on 11 November 1977 against New Zealand at Toulouse.

== Honours ==
- Selected to represent France, 1976–1983
- Five Nations Championship: 1983 and 1986
- Grand Slam : 1981
- Mediterranean Games 1979, 1983
