= Gheorghe Dumitru =

- Born: 31 January 1952 (age 74) Hagieni, [[Ialomita County]], Romania

Rugby union career
- Position: Lock
Senior career
Years	Team	Apps	(Points)
1973–1989	Farul Constanța		
1989–1990	Spartak Varna		
1990–1992	USA Limoges		
International career
Years	Team	Apps	(Points)
1973–1987	Romania	68	(12)

Gheorghe Dumitru (born 31 January 1952) is a Romanian former rugby union footballer and coach. He played as a lock.

== Career ==
He was born in Hagieni, a village in Limanu commune, Constanța County. Dumitru mostly played for Farul Constanța, with which he was national champion, until 1989, when he moved to Bulgaria to play for Spartak Varna, winning the championship and the Bulgarian Cup. In 1990, Dumitru moved to France and became player and assistant coach for USA Limoges, which was promoted to the second tier of the French rugby. He retired in 1992, but he still played for an amateur side, Rugby Club Palaisien, which named their stadium after Dumitru.

Dumitru debuted for Romania on 14 April 1973, against Spain, in Constanța, during the FIRA Trophy of that year. He contributed to the historical victories against France in 1976 (15–12) and in 1980 (15–0), Wales in 1983 (24–7) and against Scotland in 1984 (28–22). He also captained Romania in the 1979 tour of Wales, earning from the British press the nickname "Captain of the Arms Park". Together with Mircea Paraschiv, he was also player-coach for Romania during the first edition of the Rugby World Cup in 1987, playing two matches in the tournament. His last cap for Romania was against France, on 11 November 1987, in Agen.

== See also ==
- List of Romania national rugby union players
