= Dumitru Alexandru =

Romania international rugby union player

- Born: 22 August 1953 (age 73) Bucharest, Romania

Rugby union career
- Position: Fly-half
Youth career
- 1962-1972: Ș.S.E. 2
Senior career
Years	Team	Apps	(Points)
1972-1973	RC Grivița		
1973-1990	CSA Steaua București		
International career
Years	Team	Apps	(Points)
1974–1990	Romania	47	(110)

Dumitru Alexandru,"Mitus", (born 22 August 1953 in Bucharest) is a Romanian former professional rugby union player. He was one of the best fly-halves of his generation. Since 2000, he has been a talent scout and President of the Disciplinary Committee (until 2008) for F.R.R. and since 2014 a member of the Commission for the Status and Transfer of Players.

== Club career ==
Alexandru played for RC Grivița, and then, for CSA Steaua București, where he won 12 Romanian national championship titles between 1973 and 1989 .

== International career ==
He represented Romania at junior, youth and senior levels. He won the European Junior Championship in Rome in 1972 and later contributed to Romania’s victories in the FIRA European Nations Cup in 1975, 1977, 1981 and 1983. From 1974 to 1988, he represented his country at international level, playing a total of 48 caps for his country, and was part of Romania’s team at the inaugural 1987 Rugby World Cup, where he played two matches in the tournament, and scored 18 points. Alexandru first played for Romania in a match against Poland, on 14 March 1974, in Bucharest. His last cap for Romania was against Italy, on 14 April 1990, in Frascati.

== Honours ==
RC Grivița București

- Cupa României: 1972/73

CSA Steaua București

- Divizia Națională: 1973/74, 1976/77, 1978/79, 1979/80, 1980/81, 1982/83, 1983/84, 1984/85, 1986/87, 1987/88, 1988/89
- Cupa României: 1973/74, 1976/77, 1977/78

Romania

- European Junior Rugby Championship: Rome 1972
- FIRA Trophy: 1974/75, 1976/77, 1980/81, 1982/83

== See also ==
- List of Romania national rugby union players
