= Adrian Lungu =

Romanian rugby union player (born 1960)

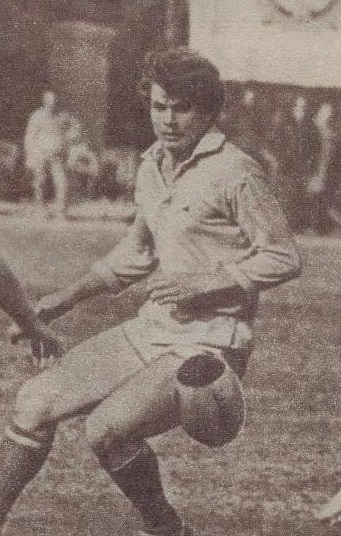
- Lungu with Romania in 1983
- Born: 5 September 1960 (age 66) Năvodari, Romania
- Height: 6 ft 1 in (1.85 m)
- Weight: 176 lb (80 kg; 12 st 8 lb)

Rugby union career
- Position: Centre
International career
Years	Team	Apps	(Points)
1980–1995	Romania	76	(12)

Adrian Lungu (born 5 September 1960) is a Romanian former rugby union player. He played 76 times as a center or wing for the Romanian national team. He is the father of Remus Lungu, who is himself a rugby union international.

Lungu was born on 5 September 1960 in Năvodari, Constanța County. He played for CSS Locomotiva Bucuresti, and then for Steaua București with whom he won two SuperLiga titles in 1980, 1981. He also played for Farul Constanţa and Dinamo București. He made his international debut against Italy in 1980. In 1993, Adrian played for Castres when they won the French championship who beat Grenoble 14-11 in the final, in a match decided by an irregular try by Castres' Gary Whetton accorded by the referee, alongside a try scored by Grenoble' Olivier Brouzet, which was denied by the referee as well.

At international level, Lungu took part at the 1987 and 1991 World Cups before retiring at thirty-four at the Rugby World Cup in South Africa. His final game was against Australia on 3 June 1995.

After his retirement, he coached the youth team of Castres.
