= Mircea Paraschiv =

Romanian rugby union player and coach

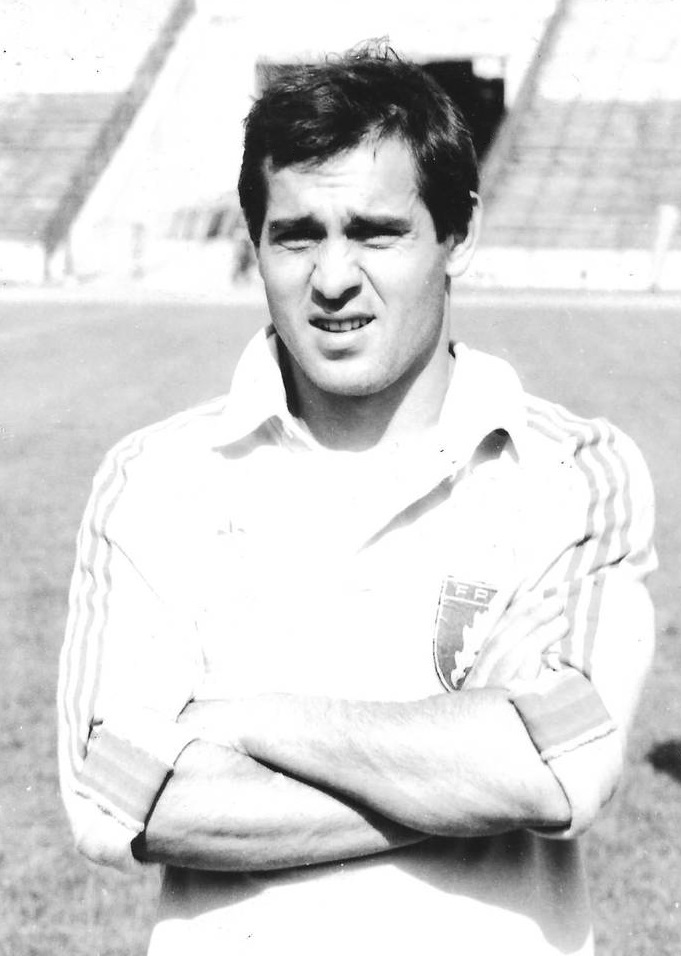
- Paraschiv in 1983
- Born: 14 December 1954 (age 71). Bucharest, Romania

Rugby union career
- Position: Scrum-half
- Current team: retired
Senior career
Years	Team	Apps	(Points)
1973–1975	Sportul Studențesc		
1975–1987	Dinamo București		
International career
Years	Team	Apps	(Points)
1975–1987	Romania	62	(24)
Coaching career
- Years: Team
- 1988–2006: Dinamo București
- 1995–2009: Romania
- 2010: Farul Constanţa
- 2012–2016: Moldova

Mircea Paraschiv (born 14 December 1954) is a Romanian former professional rugby union player and coach. He was one of the best scrum-halves of his generation.

He is currently the single Romanian player inducted to the World Rugby Museum Wall of Fame, inaugurated in 2005 in Twickenham.

== Club career ==
He played for Dinamo București, from 1975 until his retirement in 1987. He won the Romanian Rugby League title in the 1981–82 season.

== International career ==
Paraschiv has 62 caps for Romania from 1975 to 1987. He made his debut in Madrid on 4 May 1975 in a 16–12 win over Spain in the 1974–75 FIRA Trophy. His last international game was against France in November 1987. He scored 6 tries during his international career, 24 points on aggregate. He captained his national side from 1976 to 1987.

Paraschiv was player and assistant coach at the 1987 Rugby World Cup. He played in all the three games, scoring a try in the 21–20 win over Zimbabwe in May 1987 in Auckland.

== Coaching career ==
After retiring as a player, he became a full-time coach. He coached Dinamo Bucharest, from 1988 to 2006, where he led the club to success, winning 8 league titles and 4 Romanian Cups.

Paraschiv was the head coach of Romania at the 1995 Rugby World Cup, with Constantin Fugigi. Romania had three losses but achieved an honourable defeat of 21–8 to future champions South Africa. He was also the head coach at the 1999 Rugby World Cup, achieving a 27–25 win over the United States.

He was chosen as the coach of Farul Constanţa in 2010.
