= 1985–1987 FIRA Trophy =

European rugby union championship

1985–87 FIRA Trophy
- Date: 30 October 1985 – 9 May 1987
- Countries: France; Italy; Romania; Portugal; Soviet Union; Tunisia

Tournament statistics
- Champions: France
- Matches played: 30

The 1985–87 FIRA Trophy was the 26th edition of a European rugby union championship for national teams. It was played along two seasons (1985–1986 and 1986–87)

The tournament was won by France, who only awarded caps in the games with Romania. France won nine matches and had a single surprising loss to the Soviet Union (15–9), at home. This was the last FIRA Trophy before the first Rugby World Cup, that took place in 1987. Romania and Italy, who finished at 3rd and 4th places, respectively, were among the nine countries invited to participate. The Soviet Union declined the invitation for political reasons, due to the South Africa membership of IRFB. The African side of Tunisia finished in 5th place and was relegated, managing to defeat twice Portugal and having a surprise win over the strong Romania side (17–15) at home. Portugal lost all their ten games and was also relegated, with his best result being a close loss to Italy abroad by 26–24.

Spain and Netherlands won the Division 2 pools, facing each other in a final won by Spain (28–10).

== First division ==
Place	Nation	Games				Points			Table points
Place	Nation	played	won	drawn	lost	for	against	difference	Table points
1	France	10	9	0	1	277	74	+203	28
2	Soviet Union	10	7	0	3	178	98	+80	24
3	Romania	10	6	0	4	186	139	+47	22
4	Italy	10	5	0	5	162	123	+39	20
5	Tunisia	10	3	0	7	91	214	-123	16
6	Portugal	10	0	0	10	111	357	-246	10

- Tunisia and Portugal relegated to second division

Point system: try 4 pt, conversion: 2 pt., penalty kick 3 pt. drop 3 pt
Click "show" for more info about match (scorers, line-up etc)

20 October 1985

Romania	16 – 13	Soviet Union
Try: Paraschiv; Pen: Nastase (4)		Try: Tikhonov; Con: Mironov; Pen: Mironov (2)

Dinamo Stadium, Bucharest
Attendance: 1,500
Referee: (France) Y. Peytavin

1 November 1985

France XV	33 – 0	Tunisia

10 November 1985

Soviet Union	15 – 13	Italy
Try: Mironov; Con: Mironov (2); Pen: Mironov		Try: Ghizzoni; Pen: Bettarello (2); Drop: Bettarello

Fili Stadium Moscow
Attendance: 3,500
Referee: (France) René Bourquet

7 December 1985	Italy	19 – 3	Romania	Stadio Tommaso Fattori, L'Aquila
	Try: Appiani, Bettarello, Morelli; Con: Bettarello 2 Pen: Bettarello		Pen: Ion	Attendance: 8,000; Referee: Y.Bressy (France)
Italy: 15.Luigi Troiani, 14.Massimo Mascioletti, 13.Fabio Gaetaniello, 12.Sergio Zorzi, 11.Serafino Ghizzoni, 10.Stefano Bettarello, 9.Alessandro Fusco, 8.Giuseppe Artuso, 7.Sergio Appiani, 6.Marzio Innocenti (cap.), 5.Antonio Colella, 4.Mauro Gardin, 3.Guido Rossi, 2.Giorgio Morelli, 1.Giancarlo Cucchiella				Attendance: 8,000; Referee: Y.Bressy (France)
Romania: 15.Alexandru Marin, 14.R. Voinov, 13.Adrian Lungu, 12.Stefan Tofan, 11.N. Copil, 10.Vasile Ion, 9.Mircea Paraschiv, 8.Florica Murariu, 7.Cristian Raducanu, 6.M. Giucal, 5.S. Galan, 4.Laurentiu Constantin, 3.P. Petrisor, 2.Marin Mot, 1.Ion Bucan – replacements: 16.Stelian Podarascu

8 February 1986

Italy	18 – 4	Tunisia
Try: Bettarello; Con: Bettarello; Pen: Bettarello (4)		Try: Meouhachi

Stadio Comunale Mario Battaglini, Rovigo
Referee: (Spain) Jourko

15 February 1986

France A1	18-0	Italy
Try: Lagisquet, Rodriguez, Lorieux; Con: Sallefranque (3)

Parc des Sports, Annecy
Referee: (Scotland) Jim Fleming

22 February 1986

Portugal	14 – 34	Romania

Alfredo da Silva Stadium, Barreiro

22 March 1986

Portugal	18 – 60	France XV

Pina Manique Stadium, Lisbon

12 April 1986	France	25 – 13	Romania	Stade Nord Lille, Villeneuve-d'Ascq
	Try: Erbani, Lagisquet, Sella; Bonneval, Charvet; Con: Laporte; Pen: Laporte		Try: David, Hodorca; Con: Ignat; Pen: Ignat	Attendance: 14,951; Referee: C.Waldrom (Australia)
France: 15.Serge Blanco, 14.Jean-Baptiste Lafond, 13.Philippe Sella, 12.Denis Charvet, 11.Eric Bonneval, 10.Guy Laporte, 9.Pierre Berbizier, 8.Jean-Luc Joinel, 7.Dominique Erbani, 6.Eric Champ, 5.Jean Condom, 4.Francis Haget, 3.Jean-Pierre Garuet-Lempirou, 2.Daniel Dubroca (cap.), 1.Philippe Marocco – replacements: 16.Patrice Lagisquet, 17.Thierry Picard				Attendance: 14,951; Referee: C.Waldrom (Australia)
Romania: 15.Liviu Hodorca, 14.Marcel Toader, 13.Adrian Lungu, 12.Vasile David, 11.Gheorghie Varzaru, 10.Gelu Ignat, 9.Teodor Coman, 8.Stefan Constantin, 7.M. Giucal, 6.Florica Murariu (cap.), 5.Gheorghie Caragea, 4.Laurentiu Constantin, 3.Vasile Pascu, 2.Marin Mot, 1.Florea Opris – replacements: 16.R. Voinov

13 April 1986

Italy	26 – 24	Portugal
Try: Gaetaniello, Lorigiola, Mascioletti, Venturi; Con: Bettarello (2); Pen: Bettarello (2)		Try: Ferreira, Malo; Con: Queimado (2); Pen: Queimado (4)

Campo Carlo Quaresima, Jesi
Referee: (Romania) Vasilica

18 April 1986

Tunisia	4 – 12	Soviet Union

Olympic Centre, Tunis

26 April 1986

Tunisia	24 – 21	Portugal

El Menzah Stadium, Tunis

1 May 1986

Soviet Union	7 – 14	France XV

Kirov Stadium, Leningrad

3 May 1986

Tunisia	17 – 15	Romania

Monastir

17 May 1986

Portugal	3 – 29	Soviet Union
Pen: Queimado		Try: Mironov (2), Samardin, Tikhonov, Borisov; Con: Mironov (3); Drop: Nechaev

Municipal Stadium, Barreiro

5 October 1986

Romania	37 – 9	Tunisia

Stade 1 Mai, Constanța
Referee: (France) M. Connes

18 October 1986

Romania	43 – 7	Portugal
Try: Bucan, Lungu, Tofan, Popescu (5); Con: Nastase (4); Pen: Nastase		Try: Queimado; Pen: Queimado

Stadionul Giulesti, Birlad
Attendance: 5,000
Referee: (France) H. Vilatte

18 October 1986

Tunisia	9 – 22	Italy
Try: Ferjani; Con: Buoghanmi; Pen: Buoghanmi		Try: Artuso, Osti; Con: Bettarello; Pen: Bettarello (3); Drop: Bettarello

Menzel Bourguiba
Referee: (Belgium) Roelands

23 October 1986	Romania	3 – 20	France	Stadionul Giulesti, Bucharest
	Pen: Nastase		Try: Andrieu, Berot, Blanco; Con: Berot; Pen: Berot 2	Attendance: 8,000; Referee: (New Zealand) Dave Bishop
Romania: 15.Gheorghe Florea, 14.Cornel Popescu, 13.Adrian Lungu, 12.Ștefan Tofan, 11.Marcel Toader, 10.V. Nastase, 9.S. Seceleanu, 8.Laurentiu Constantin, 7.Haralambie Dumitras, 6.Ioan Doja, 5.Gheorghie Caragea, 4.Gheorghie Dumitru, 3.Gheorghie Corneliu, 2.Mircea Munteanu (cap.), 1.Florea Opris – replacements: 16.Gheorghe Ion				Attendance: 8,000; Referee: (New Zealand) Dave Bishop
France: 15.Serge Blanco, 14.Philippe Berot, 13.Philippe Sella, 12.Eric Bonneval, 11.Marc Andrieu, 10.Jean-Patrick Lescarboura, 9.Pierre Berbizier, 8.Alain Carminati, 7.Laurent Rodriguez, 6.Eric Champ, 5.Jean Condom, 4.Alain Lorieux, 3.Jean-Pierre Garuet-Lempirou, 2.Daniel Dubroca (cap.), 1.Herve Chabowski

16 November 1986

Italy	14 – 16	Soviet Union
Try: Ghizzoni, Collodo, Innocenti; Con: Bettarello		Try: Mironov; Pen: Mironov (3); Drop: Mironov

Stadio Marassi, Genova
Referee: (France) P. Frantschi

1 November 1986

France XV	9 – 15	Soviet Union

18 January 1987

Portugal	3 – 41	Italy
Pen: Queimado		Try: Colella, Collodo, Cuttitta, Gardin, Ghizzoni, penalty try Con: Troiani (4); Pen: Troiani (2); Drop: Collodo

Lisbon University Stadium, Lisbon
Referee: (France) P. Frantschi

8 February 1987

France XV	38 – 6	Portugal

Stade La Fougère, Saint-Vincent-de-Tyrosse

22 February 1987

Italy	6 – 22	France A1
Pen: Troiani; Drop: Collodo		Try: Bonal, Cabannes, penalty try Con: Sallefranque (2); Pen: Sallefranque (2)

Stadio Plebiscito, Padua
Referee: (Wales) L. J. Peard

12 April 1987	Romania	9 – 3	Italy	Stade 1. May, Constanța
	Pen: Alexandru (3)		Pen: Bettarello	Attendance: 2,000; Referee: JC Yche (France)
Romania: 15.Vasile Ion, 14.Marcel Toader, 13.Adrian Lungu, 12.Ștefan Tofan, 11.Liviu Hodorca, 10.Dumitru Alexandru, 9.Mircea Paraschiv, 8.Ene Necula, 7.Haralambie Dumitras, 6.Florica Murariu, 5.Laurentiu Constantin, 4.Stefan Constantin, 3.Gheorghe Leonte, 2.Emilian Grigore, 1.Ion Bucan – replacements: 16.Cristian Raducanu				Attendance: 2,000; Referee: JC Yche (France)
Italy: 15.Daniele Tebaldi, 14.Serafino Ghizzoni, 13.Oscar Collodo, 12.Stefano Barba, 11.Marcello Cuttitta, 10.Stefano Bettarello, 9.Fulvio Lorigiola, 8.Gianni Zanon, 7.Giuseppe Artuso, 6.Marzio Innocenti (cap.), 5.Franco Berni, 4.Mauro Gardin, 3.Tito Lupini, 2.Antonio Galeazzo, 1.Guido Rossi

18 April 1987

Portugal	9 – 12	Tunisia

Lisbon University Stadium, Lisbon

25 April 1987

Soviet Union	12 – 13	Romania
Pen: Mironov, Dzagnidze (3)		Try: Marin; Pen: Alexandru (2); Drop: Alexandru

Lokomotivi Stadium, Tbilisi
Attendance: several thousand in rain
Referee: Yves Bressy (France)

29 April 1987

Soviet Union	9 – 6	Tunisia
Pen: Dzagnidze (3)		Pen: Boughamni (2)

Central Stadium, Kutaisi
Attendance: 15 thousand
Referee: Giovanni Campanile (Italy)

9 May 1987

Soviet Union	50 – 6	Portugal
Try: Mironov, Nechaev (2), Sokolov, Korolev (2), Vorapaev, Tikhonov, Medved; Con: Dzagnidze (7)		Pen: Queimado (2)

Kharkov

9 May 1987

Tunisia	6 – 38	France XV

== Second division ==
=== Pool A ===
Place	Nation	Games				Points			Table points
Place	Nation	played	won	drawn	lost	for	against	difference	Table points
1	Spain	6	5	0	1	158	40	+118	16
2	Poland	6	3	0	3	95	100	-5	12
3	Morocco	6	2	0	4	42	76	-34	10
4	West Germany	6	2	0	4	37	116	-79	10

27 October 1985

Poland	3 – 24	Spain

Sopot

10 November 1985

West Germany	13 – 11	Spain

Rudolf-Kalweit-Stadion, Hanover

9 February 1986

Spain	23 – 12	Morocco

Estadio Nacional Complutense, Madrid

13 April 1986

Poland	28 – 12	West Germany

Poznań

27 April 1986

West Germany	6 – 0	Morocco

Fritz-Grunebaum-Sportpark, Heidelberg

11 May 1986

Morocco	16 – 14	Poland

Casablanca

29 November 1986

Spain	50 – 0	West Germany

Estadio Nacional Complutense, Madrid

14 December 1986

Morocco	3 – 12	Spain

Casablanca

5 April 1987

Morocco	7 – 0	West Germany

Casablanca

12 April 1987

Poland	21 – 4	Morocco

Ruda Śląska

26 April 1987

Spain	38 – 9	Poland

Estadio Nacional Complutense, Madrid

10 May 1987

West Germany	6 – 20	Poland

Rudolf-Kalweit-Stadion, Hanover

=== Pool B ===
Place	Nation	Games				Points			Table points
Place	Nation	played	won	drawn	lost	for	against	difference	Table points
1	Netherlands	6	5	0	1	83	52	+31	16
2	Czechoslovakia	6	4	0	2	128	51	+77	14
3	Belgium	6	2	0	4	44	62	-18	10
4	Sweden	6	1	0	5	30	120	-90	8

5 October 1985

Sweden	11 – 16	Netherlands

Aarstad

19 November 1985

Czechoslovakia	14 – 3	Belgium

Prague

16 March 1986

Belgium	0 – 11	Netherlands

Dendermonde

13 April 1986

Netherlands	9 – 6	Czechoslovakia

Sportpark Berestein, Hilversum

10 May 1986

Sweden	12 – 6	Belgium

Malmö

1 June 1986

Czechoslovakia	51 – 3	Sweden

Tatra

17 October 1986

Netherlands	23 – 0	Sweden

Castricum

19 October 1986

Belgium	9 – 0	Sweden

Brussels

22 November 1986

Belgium	18 – 15	Czechoslovakia

Vise

8 March 1987

Netherlands	10 – 8	Belgium

Sportpark Berestein, Hilversum

12 April 1987

Czechoslovakia	27 – 14	Netherlands

24 May 1987

Sweden	4 – 15	Czechoslovakia

Ronneby

=== Final ===
10 May 1987

Spain	28 – 10	Netherlands

Parc Lescure, Bordeaux

- Spain promoted to division 1

== Bibliography ==
- (in Italian) Francesco Volpe, Valerio Vecchiarelli (2000), 2000 Italia in Meta, Storia della nazionale italiana di rugby dagli albori al Sei Nazioni, GS Editore (2000) ISBN 88-87374-40-6.
- (in Italian) Francesco Volpe, Paolo Pacitti (Author), Rugby 2000, GTE Gruppo Editorale (1999).
