= 1980–81 FIRA Trophy =

European rugby union championship

1980-81 FIRA Trophy
- Date: 1 October 1980 – 17 May 1981
- Countries: France; Italy; Romania; Poland; Soviet Union; Spain

Tournament statistics
- Champions: Romania
- Matches played: 15

The 1980–81 FIRA Trophy was the 21st edition of a European rugby union championship for national teams.

The tournament was won by Romania, who achieved a Grand Slam, defeating all their opponents. Romania had a memorable 15–0 win over France at 23 November 1980, in Bucharest.

== First division ==
- Table

Place	Nation	Games				Points			Table points
Place	Nation	played	won	drawn	lost	for	against	difference	Table points
1	Romania	5	5	0	0	157	25	+132	15
2	France	5	4	0	1	129	59	+70	13
3	Italy	5	2	0	3	76	81	-5	9
4	Soviet Union	5	2	0	3	38	87	-49	9
5	Spain	5	1	0	4	98	146	-48	7
6	Poland	5	1	0	4	46	146	-100	7

Spain and Poland relegated to division 2

- Results

Point system: try 4 pt, conversion: 2 pt., penalty kick 3 pt. drop 3 pt
Click "show" for more info about match (scorers, line-up etc)

1 October 1980

France A1	23 - 10	Soviet Union

5 October 1980	Italy	37 - 12	Poland	Stadio Battaglini, Rovigo
	Try: Ghizzoni 2, Robazza; Bettarello, R. Francescato, Con: Bettarello 4 Pen: Bettarello 3			Referee: Craciunescou (Romania)
Italy:15.Claudio Torresan, 14.Luca Bonaiti, 13.Rino Francescato, 12.Nello Francescato, 11.Serafino Ghizzoni, 10.Stefano Bettarello, 9.Fulvio Lorigiola, 8.Claudio Tinari, 7.Narciso Zanella, 6.Fabrizio Sintich, 5.Stefano Annibal, 4.Massimo Trippitelli, 3.Ambrogio Bona (cap), 2.Claudio Robazza, 1.Fulvio di Carlo				Referee: Craciunescou (Romania)
Poland:15.Piatkovski, 14.Kadach, 13.Kuc, 12.Mtaczak, 11.Ciesielski, 10.Stasiolek, 9.Kiciniski (41' Kurant), 8.Jagienak, 7.Pienek, 6.Zawadski, 5.Krac, 4.Baranieki, 3.Piasek, 2.Stasiuk, 1.Krawczak

2 November 1980	Italy	3 - 4	Soviet Union	Stadio Battaglini, Rovigo
	Pen: Bettarello		Try: Plotnikov	Referee: JC Doulcet (France)
Italy:15.Claudio Torresan, 14.Nino Rossi, 13.Rino Francescato, 12.Nello Francescato (cap), 11.Serafino Ghizzoni, 10.Stefano Bettarello, 9.Fulvio Lorigiola, 8.Claudio Tinari, 7.Narcisio Zanella, 6.Mario Pavin, 5.Salvatore Bonetti, 4.Louis Basei, 3.Giancarlo Pivetta, 2.Paolo Pavesi, 1.Renato de Bernardo				Referee: JC Doulcet (France)
Soviet Union:15.Gonyani, 14.Berzin, 13.Karpuskin, 12.Salvatov, 11.Mironov, 10.Sljussar, 9.Sliushnikov, 8.Tikhonov, 7.Barinov, 6.Joravliov, 5.Ochitkov, 4.Plotnikov, 3.Epifanov, 2.Barbariusch, 1.Sheverev

9 November 1980

Poland	0 - 33	Romania

Sochaczew

16 November 1980

Spain	20 - 25	Poland

Estadio de Vallehermoso, Madrid

23 November 1980	Romania	15 - 0	France	Dimano Stadium, Bucharest
	Try: Bors; Con: Constantin; Pen: Constantin 3			Attendance: 20,000; Referee: A.Richards (Wales)
Romania:15.Ion Simion, 14.Sorin Fuicu, 13.Gheorghie Varzaru, 12.Ion Constantin, 11.Marian Aldea, 10.Dumitru Alexandru, 9.Mircea Paraschiv (cap), 8.Pompiliu Bors, 7.Enciu Stoica, 6.Florica Murariu, 5.Gheorghie Caragea, 4.Gheorghie Dumitru, 3.Constantin Dinu, 2.Mircea Munteanu, 1.Ion Bucan				Attendance: 20,000; Referee: A.Richards (Wales)
France:15.Serge Blanco, 14.Daniel Bustaffa, 13.Roland Bertranne, 12.Patrick Mesny, 11.Laurent Pardo, 10.Bernard Vivies, 9.Jean-Pierre Elissalde, 8.Manuel Carpentier, 7.Éric Buchet, 6.Jean-Pierre Fauvel, 5.Jean-Paul Wolf, 4.Alain Maleig, 3.Robert Paparemborde (cap), 2.Philippe Dintrans, 1.Michel Crémaschi

21 December 1980	Spain	13 - 18	Italy	Polideportivo Municipal de Orcasitas, Madrid
				Referee: Horquet (France)
Spain:15.Rafael Canosa, 14.Salvador Torres, 13.José Tormo, 12.Fernando García de la Torre, 11.José Ruiz Cristín, 10.Manolo Moriche, 9.Javier Goicochea, 8.Enrique Lobo, 7.Rafael Cienfuegos, 6.Juan Francisco Neira (79' Luis Alfonso Paul), 5. Felipe Blanco, 4 Tomás Pardo, 3.Javier Camiña, 2.Santiago Santos, 1. Antonio Machuca				Referee: Horquet (France)
Italy:15.Fabrizio Gaetaniello, 14.Nello Francescato, 13.Gianluca Limone, 12.Rino Francescato (41' Fabio Gaetaniello), 11.Serafino Ghizzoni, 10.Stefano Bettarello, 9.Fulvio Lorigiola, 8.Claudio Tinari, 7.Fabrizio Sintich, 6.Franco Bargelli, 5.Stefano Annibal, 4.Massimo Trippitelli, 3.Ambrogio Bona (cap), 2.Claudio Robazza, 1.Renato de Bernardo

8 March 1981	Italy	9 - 17	France A1	Stadio Battaglini, Rovigo
	Drop: Bettarello		Try: Averous, Delage; Belascain; Con: Vivies; Pen: Vivies	Referee: M.Rea (Republic of Ireland)
Italy:15.Fabrizio Gaetaniello, 14.Alberto Osti, 13.Nello Francescato, 12.Rino Francescato, 11.Serafino Ghizzoni, 10.Stefano Bettarello, 9.Fulvio Lorigiola, 8.Gianni Zanon, 7.Franco Bargelli, 6.Giuseppe Artuso, 5.Stefano Annibal, 4.Massimo Trippitelli, 3.Ambrogio Bona (cap), 2.Claudio Robazza, 1.Renato de Bernardo				Referee: M.Rea (Republic of Ireland)
France A1:15.Delage, 14.Pelliccia, 13.Belascain, 12.Sangalli, 11.Averous, 10.Vivies, 9.JP Elissalde, 8.Rongieras, 7.Traille, 6.Cordier, 5.Salas, 4.Guilbert, 3.Montagny, 2.Dupont, 1.Crémaschi

22 March 1981

Spain	19 - 40	France A1

La Foixarda, Barcelona

12 April 1981	Romania	35 - 9	Italy	Brăila Municipal Stadium, Brăila
	Try: Aldea, Fuicu 2, Lungu; Munteanu 2, Paraschiv; Con: Constantin 2 Pen: Constantin		Try: Bettarello; Con: Bettarello; Pen: Bettarello	Referee: J.A. Short (Scotland)
Romania:15.Ion Constantin, 14.Marian Aldea, 13.Gheorghie Varzaru, 12.Adrian Lungu, 11.Sorin Fuicu, 10.Mihai Marghescu, 9.Mircea Paraschiv, 8.Enciu Stoica, 7.Pompiliu Bors, 6.Alexandru Radulescu, 5.Gheorghie Dumitru, 4.Gheorghie Caragea, 3.Constantin Dinu, 2.Mircea Monteanu, 1.Ion Bucan				Referee: J.A. Short (Scotland)
Italy:15.Fabrizio Gaetaniello, 14.Alberto Osti, 13.Nello Francescato (cap), 12.Rino Francescato, 11.Bruno Francescato, 10.Stefano Bettarello, 9.Fulvio Lorigiola, 8.Gianni Zanon, 7.Franco Bargelli, 6.Fabrizio Sintich, 5.Louis Basei, 4.Massimo Trippitelli, 3.Giancarlo Pivetta, 2.Claudio Robazza, 1.Renato de Bernardo - replacements: 16.Claudio Torresan, 17.Fabio Trentin

26 April 1981	Spain	6 - 56	Romania	La Foixarda, Barcelona

10 May 1981	Soviet Union	7 - 40	Spain	Spartak Stadium, Kiev
	Try: Plotnikov; Liluashvili; Barinov; Tikhonov; Berzin; Gonyany; Con: Barinov; Pen: Gonyany		Try: González Lozano; Pen: Lobo
USSR:15.Anatoly Gonyany , 14.[[Aleksandr Berzin], 13. Yuri Karpukhin (cap.), 12.Ivan Mironov, 11.Valery Proshin, 10.Oleg Sljussar, 9.Valery Klyuchnikov, 8.Aleksandr Alyoshin, 7.Andrey Barinov, 6.Sergey Zhuravlev, 5.Vissarion Liluashvili, 4.Nikolay Plotnikov, 3.Aleksandr Epifanov, 2.Aleksandr Fedorov, 1.Anatoly Sheverev - replacements: Tahir Salavatov
Spain:15.Rafael Canosa, 14.Salvador Torres, 13.José Tormo, 12.Fernando García de la Torre, 11.José Manuel González Lozano, 10.Manolo Moriche(cap.), 9.Enrique Lobo, 8.Juan Francisco Neira, 7.Sergi Longhney, 6.Felipe Blanco, 5..Carlos Rodríguez García, 4. Ángel García Guerrero, 3.Javier Camiña, 2.Santiago Santos, 1.Antonio Machuca

17 May 1981

Soviet Union	10 - 18	Romania

Sparta Stadium, Moscow

1981

Poland	3 - 7	Soviet Union

Olsztyn

1981

France XV	49 - 6	Poland

Stade René-Corbelle, Bully-les-Mines

== Second division ==
- Table

Place	Nation	Games				Points			Table points
Place	Nation	played	won	drawn	lost	for	against	difference	Table points
1	West Germany	4	3	0	1	65	41	+24	10
2	Netherlands	4	3	0	1	58	28	+30	10
3	Tunisia	4	2	0	2	37	61	-24	8
4	Morocco	4	2	0	2	55	29	+26	8
5	Yugoslavia	4	0	0	4	0	56	-56	3

Germany Promoted to division 1

Yugoslavia relegated to division 3

- Results

16 November 1980

West Germany	13 - 10	Netherlands

Hanover

14 December 1980

Netherlands	17 - 0	Yugoslavia

Sportpark Berestein, Hilversum

30 November 1980

Yugoslavia	0 - 16	West Germany

Kaldejevo

1980

Tunisia	13 - 10	Morocco

29 March 1981

West Germany	30 - 9	Tunisia

Heidelberg

12 April 1981

Morocco	22 - 6	West Germany

Casablanca

25 April 1981

Yugoslavia	0 - 17	Morocco

Split

1981

Morocco	6 - 10	Netherlands

1981

Netherlands	21 - 9	Tunisia

Tunisia	6 – 0 forfeit	Yugoslavia

== Third division ==
- Table

Place	Nation	Games				Points			Table points
Place	Nation	played	won	drawn	lost	for	against	difference	Table points
1	Portugal	4	4	0	0	114	33	+81	12
2	Belgium	4	3	0	1	55	24	+31	10
3	Sweden	4	2	0	2	37	30	+7	8
4	Denmark	4	1	0	3	49	115	-66	6
5	Switzerland	4	0	0	4	20	73	-53	4

Portugal promoted to division 2

- Results

13 September 1980

Denmark	4 - 20	Sweden

Aarhus

18 October 1980

Sweden	0 - 7	Belgium

Enkoping

1 November 1980

Switzerland	4 - 7	Sweden

29 November 1980

Belgium	7 - 0	Switzerland

28 February 1981

Portugal	39 - 0	Switzerland

Lisbon

5 April 1981

Portugal	15 - 7	Belgium

Coimbra

11 April 1981

Switzerland	16 - 20	Denmark

Losanna

14 April 1981

Belgium	34 - 9	Denmark

15 May 1981

Denmark	16 - 45	Portugal

17 May 1981

Sweden	10 - 15	Portugal

Trelleborg

== Bibliography ==
- (in Italian) Francesco Volpe, Valerio Vecchiarelli (2000), 2000 Italia in Meta, Storia della nazionale italiana di rugby dagli albori al Sei Nazioni, GS Editore (2000) ISBN 88-87374-40-6.
- (in Italian) Francesco Volpe, Paolo Pacitti (Author), Rugby 2000, GTE Gruppo Editorale (1999).
