= 1978–79 FIRA Trophy =

European rugby union championship

1978-79 FIRA Trophy
- Date: 18 November 1978– 4 May 1979
- Countries: France; Italy; Romania; Poland; Spain; Soviet Union

Tournament statistics
- Champions: France
- Matches played: 15

The 1978–79 FIRA Trophy was the 19th edition of a European rugby union championship for national teams.

The tournament was won by France, with a Grand Slam. Romania reached the 2nd place, achieving an historical 44–0 win over Italy at 22 April 1979, in Bucharest.

== First division ==
- Table

Place	Nation	Games				Points			Table points
Place	Nation	played	won	drawn	lost	for	against	difference	Table points
1	France	5	5	0	0	171	34	+137	15
2	Romania	5	4	0	1	117	33	+84	13
3	Soviet Union	5	2	0	3	71	76	-5	9
4	Italy	5	2	0	3	55	75	-20	9
5	Poland	5	1	0	4	47	100	-53	7
6	Spain	5	1	0	4	31	174	-143	7

Spain relegated to division 2

- Results

Point system: try 4 pt, conversion: 2 pt., penalty kick 3 pt. drop 3 pt
Click "show" for more info about match (scorers, line-up etc)

18 November 1978

Italy	9 - 11	Soviet Union

Stadio Flaminio, Rome

19 November 1978

Poland	9 - 30	Romania

Lublin

3 December 1978	Romania	6 - 9	France	Stadionul Dinamo, Bucharest
	Pen: Constantin 2		Pen: Aguirre 2 Drop: Caussade	Referee: M.Rea (Ireland)
Romania:15.Teodorin Tudose, 14.Petre Ianusevici, 13.Gheorghe Nica, 12.Ion Constantin, 11.Petre Motrescu, 10.Mihai Bucos, 9.Mircea Paraschiv, 8.Gheorghie Dumitru (cap.), 7.Enciu Stoica, 6.Florică Murariu, 5.Marin Ionescu, 4.Gheorghe Daraban, 3.Alexandru Ioniță, 2.Mircea Munteanu, 1.Constantin Dinu				Referee: M.Rea (Ireland)
France:15.Jean-Michel Aguirre, 14.Daniel Bustaffa, 13.Roland Bertranne, 12.Christian Bélascain, 11.Guy Noves, 10.Alain Caussade, 9.Yves Lafarge, 8.Michel Clémente, 7.Jean-Luc Joinel, 6.Jean-Pierre Rives (cap.), 5.Jean-Francois Imbernon, 4.Francis Haget, 3.Robert Paparemborde, 2.Alain Paco, 1.Gerard Cholley

17 December 1978	Italy	35 - 3	Spain	Stadio Comunale di Monigo, Treviso
	Try: Gaetaniello (11'); Mascioletti ('21); Bona (26'); N. Francescato (78'); Marchetto (78'); Con: Zuin (11') (26') (58'); Pen: Zuin (34') (47') (66')		Pen: Lorenzo (38')	Referee: Theodor Witting
Italy:15.Rocco Caligiuri, 14.Massimo Mascioletti, 13.Nello Francescato, 12.Fabrizio Gaetaniello, 11.Manrico Marchetto, 10.Loredano Zuin, 9.Bruno Ancillotti, 8.Elio de Anna 7.Forenzo Blessano, 6.Paolo Mariani, 5.Giuseppe Artuso, 4.Gheorghe Daraban, 3.Ambrogio Bona (cap.),, 2.Claudio Robazza, 1.Anacleto Altigieri; Replacements: Bruno Francescato				Referee: Theodor Witting
Spain:15.José Ramón Apraiz Feliu, 14.José Francisco Lorenzo Berberana, 13.José Luis Ruiz Cristín, 12.Fernando García de la Torre, 11.Francisco Godas, 10.Manolo Moriche (cap.), 9.Miguel Ángel Ribera, 8.Felipe Blanco, 7.Luis Alfonso Paul, 6.Carlos Reguero 5.Manuel Coloma, 4.Javier Camiña, 3.Antonio Martín Sánchez, 2.José Miguel Galdós, 1.Máximo Romero; Replacements: Juan Francisco Neira, Fernando Manero Zabala

26 November 1978	Spain	7 - 16	Poland	Estadi Baldiri Aleu, Sant Boi de Llobregat
	Try: Lorenzo; Con: Moriche		Pen: Lorenzo (38')
Spain: 15. José Ramón Apraiz Feliu, 14. José Francisco Lorenzo Berberana, 13. José Luis Ruiz Cristín, 12. Manolo Moriche, 11. Francisco Godas, 10. Carlos Romero Moreno, 9. Juan Luque, 8. Felipe Blanco, 7. Carlos Reguero Fuertes, 6. Francisco Soler 5. Ignacio Álvarez Cienfuegos, 4. Brendan Bordons, 3. Antonio Martín Sánchez, 2. José Miguel Galdós, 1. Adrián Rodo; Replacements: Juan Francisco Neira, Fernando Manero Zabala

1978

France XV	29 - 7	Soviet Union

Stade Ernest-Wallon, Toulouse

1979

Soviet Union	19 - 7	Poland

Moscow

18 February 1979

Italy	9 - 15	France XV

Stadio Plebiscito, Padua

4 March 1979

France XV	92 - 0	Spain

Stade de St.Pée, Oloron

14 April 1979

Italy	18 - 3	Poland

Stadio Tommaso Fattori, L'Aquila

22 April 1979	Romania	44 - 0	Italy	Stadionul Dinamo, Bucharest
	Try: Dumitru 2, Murariu 2, Stoica; Beches, Constantin, Dinu 2 Con: Constantin 3, Tudose			Referee: Jacques Saint-Guilhem (France)
Romania:15.Teodorin Tudose, 14.Gheorghe Dinu, 13.Olimpiu Becheș, 12.Ion Constantin, 11.Petre Motrescu, 10.Dumitru Alexandru, 9.Mircea Paraschiv, 8.Florică Murariu, 7.Gheorghe Dumitru, 6.Enciu Stoica, 5.Ion Pintea, 4.Marin Ionescu, 3.Octavian Corneliu, 2.Mircea Munteanu, 1.V. Ungureanu - replacements: Corneliu Scarlat				Referee: Jacques Saint-Guilhem (France)
Italy:15.Rocco Caligiuri, 14.Luca Bonaiti, 13.Fabrizio Gaetaniello, 12.Nello Francescato, 11.Manrico Marchetto, 10.Loredano Zuin, 9.Bruno Ancillotti, 8.Elio de Anna, 7.Fiorenzo Blessano, 6.Paolo Mariani (cap.), 5.Adriano Fedrigo, 4.Donato Daldoss, 3.Nick Screnci, 2.Claudio Robazza, 1.Anacleto Altigieri - replacements: Andrea Lijoi, Giancarlo Pivetta

29 April 1979	Spain	6- 22	Romania	Estadio de Vallehermoso, Madrid
	Pen: Moriche 2		Try: Dinu; Motrescu; Scarlat; Con: Constantin 2 Dumitru; Pen: Alexandru Dumitru; Dumitru	Referee: Claude Iringer
Spain:15.José Ramón Apraiz Feliu, 14.José Ruiz Cristín, 13.Fernando García de la Torre, 12.Julio Jimenez Gomez, 11.Salvador Torres, 10.Manolo Moriche, 9.Santiago Noriega, 8.José Maria Epalza (cap.), 7.Felipe Blanco, 6.Francisco Soler, 5.Tomás Pardo, 4.Juan Francisco Neira, 3.Javier Camiña, 2.Jaime Usabiaga, 1.José Miguel Galdós - replacements: Jesús Márquez				Referee: Claude Iringer
Romania:15.Teodorin Tudose, 14.Gheorghe. Dinu, 13.Emil Becheș, 12.Ion Constantin, 11.Petre Motrescu, 10.Dumitru Alexandru, 9.Mircea Paraschiv, 8.Gheorghe Dumitru, 7.Enciu Stoica, 6.Florică Murariu, 5.Ion Pintea, 4.Marin Ionescu, 3.Corneliu Scarlat, 2.Mircea Munteanu, 1.V. Ungureanu - replacements: Petre Motrescu

20 May 1979	Soviet Union	15 - 9	Spain	Fili Stadium, Moscow
	Try: Yepifanov 10'; Alyoshin 19'; Con: Gonyany 10', 19'; Pen: Gonyany 69		Try: Ruiz Cristin 4'; Con: Apraiz Feliu 4'; Pen: Apraiz Feliu 62'	Referee: Andre Aychenne
USSR:15.Anatoly Gonyany (cap.), 14.Oleg Sljussar, 13.Tahir Salavatov, 12.Yuri Vasiliev, 11.Igor Mironov, 10.Valery Proshin, 9.David Kilasonia, 8.Aleksandr Alyoshin, 7.Vasily Korotaev, 6.Sergey Oshitkov, 5.Viktor Shapovalov, 4.Nikolay Toropov, 3.Aleksandr Epifanov, 2.Aleksandr Fedorov, 1.Anatoly Sheverev - replacements: Valery Klyuchnikov, Aleksandr Tikhonov				Referee: Andre Aychenne
Spain:15.Rafael Canosa, 14.José Ramón Apraiz Feliu[, 13.José Ruiz Cristín, 12.Salvador Torres, 11.Fernando García de la Torre, 10.Manolo Moriche, 9.Miguel Angel Ribera, 8.José Maria Epalza (cap.), 7.Felipe Blanco, 6.Juan Homs Leyes, 5..Tomás Pardo, 4. Hilario Bonavida, 3.José Manuel González Lozano, 2.José Miguel Galdos, 1.Máximo Romero - replacements: Jaime Usabiaga, Javier Camiña

4 May 1979

Soviet Union	9 - 15	Romania

Harkov

1979

Poland	12 - 26	France

== Second Division ==
=== Pool 1 ===
- Table

Place	Nation	Games				Points			Table points
Place	Nation	played	won	drawn	lost	for	against	difference	Table points
1	Morocco	2	2	0	0	56	6	+50	6
2	West Germany	2	1	0	1	24	13	+11	4
3	Switzerland	2	0	0	2	0	61	-61	2

- Results

28 November 1978

Switzerland	0 - 18	West Germany

Geneva

24 March 1979

Morocco	43 - 0	Switzerland

Casablanca

8 April 1979

West Germany	6 - 13	Morocco

Hanover

=== Pool 2 ===
- Table

Place	Nation	Games				Points			Table points
Place	Nation	played	won	drawn	lost	for	against	difference	Table points
1	Netherlands	3	3	0	0	44	14	+30	9
2	Belgium	3	2	0	1	35	16	+19	7
3	Yugoslavia	3	1	0	2	18	53	-35	5
4	Sweden	3	0	0	3	9	23	-14	3

- Results

15 October 1978

Sweden	3 - 7	Yugoslavia

Enkoping

1978

Yugoslavia	0 - 20	Belgium

Makarska

2 December 1978

Yugoslavia	11 - 30	Netherlands

Split

1978

Netherlands	10 - 3	Belgium

Sportpark Berestein, Hilversum

5 November 1978

Netherlands	4 - 0	Sweden

Sportpark Berestein, Hilversum

7 November 1978

Belgium	12 - 6	Sweden

Brussels

=== Finals ===
1979

Netherlands	17 - 21	Morocco

Hilversum

Morocco promoted to division 1

== Bibliography ==
- (in Italian) Francesco Volpe, Valerio Vecchiarelli (2000), 2000 Italia in Meta, Storia della nazionale italiana di rugby dagli albori al Sei Nazioni, GS Editore (2000) ISBN 88-87374-40-6.
- (in Italian) Francesco Volpe, Paolo Pacitti (Author), Rugby 2000, GTE Gruppo Editorale (1999).
