= 1997–98 Leinster Rugby season =

- Ground(s): Donnybrook, Dublin
- Coach(es): Mike Ruddock
- Top scorer: Alan McGowan (90)
- Most tries: John McWeeney (4)
- League(s): Heineken Cup; IRFU Interprovincial Championship

The 1997-98 season was Leinster's third season under professionalism. Mike Ruddock was director of rugby. The previous coaching team of team manager Jim Glennon, forwards coach Ciaran Callan and backs coach Paul Dean, remained in place under him. They competed in the Heineken Cup, finishing third in their pool, and the IRFU Interprovincial Championship, finishing as champions.

The IRFU offered new contracts for provincial players for this season. Full-time players would receive a retainer of £25,000, plus a win bonus of £500 for Heineken Cup matches. Part-time players would be paid a retainer of £7,500, plus a match fee of £400 for Interprovincial matches and £800 for the Heineken Cup, and a win bonus of £450 for both competitions. Each province could have a maximum of 30 contracted players.

== Players selected ==
Leinster Rugby squad
**Props**: (Ireland) Peter Bruce (Terenure); (Ireland) Emmet Byrne (St Mary's); (Ireland) Reggie Corrigan (Greystones); (Ireland) **Paul Flavin** (Blackrock); (Ireland) **Henry Hurley** (Old Wesley); (Ireland) Angus McKeen (Landsowne); **Hookers**: (Ireland) James Blaney (Terenure); (Ireland) Shane Byrne (Blackrock); **Locks**: (Ireland) Aaron Freeman (Lansdowne); (Ireland) Steve Jameson (St Mary's); (Ireland) Hubi Kos (Balckrock)	**Back row**: (Ireland) Trevor Brennan (St Mary's); (Ireland) **Victor Costello** (St Mary's); (Ireland) Tony Goldfinch (Blackrock); (Ireland) Colin McEntee (Lansdowne); (Ireland) Declan O'Brien (DLSP); (Ireland) David O'Sullivan (Skerries); (Ireland) Stephen Rooney (Lansdowne); **Scrum-halves**: (Ireland) **David O'Mahony** (Lansdowne); (Ireland) **Alain Rolland** (Old Wesley); **Fly-halves**: (Ireland) Richard Governey (Lansdowne); (Ireland) **Alan McGowan** (Blackrock)	**Centres**: (Ireland) **Kurt McQuilkin** (Lansdowne); (Ireland) Martin Ridge (Old Belvedere); **Wings**: (Ireland) **Denis Hickie** (St Mary's); (Ireland) John McWeeney (St Mary's); (Ireland) **Darragh O'Mahony** (Moseley); **Fullbacks**: (Ireland) **Kieran Clarke** (Terenudre); (Ireland) Kevin Nowlan (St Mary's)
(c) denotes the team captain, **Bold** denotes internationally capped players.^{*} denotes players qualified to play for Ireland on residency or dual nationality.

== IRFU Interprovincial Championship ==
Team	P	W	D	L	F	A	BP	Pts	Status
Leinster	3	2	0	1	61	46	-	4	Champions; qualified for 1998–99 Heineken Cup
Munster	3	2	0	1	56	43	-	4	Qualified for 1998–99 Heineken Cup
Ulster	3	1	0	2	59	65	-	2	Qualified for 1998–99 Heineken Cup
Connacht	3	1	0	2	42	64	-	2	Qualified for 1998–99 European Challenge Cup

16 August 1997	Leinster	26-25	Ulster	Donnybrook
	Try: Rolland; Hickie; O'Mahony; Con: Rolland; Pen: Governey (3)	Report	Try: Laing; Con: Laing; Pen: Laing (6)	Referee: David McHugh
Leinster lineup: 1. Henry Hurley, 2. Shane Byrne, 3. Angus McKeen, 4. Declan O'Brien, 5. Aaron Freeman, 6. Trevor Brennan, 7. Victor Costello, 8. Stephen Rooney, 9. Alain Rolland, 10. Richard McGoverney, 11. Darragh O'Mahony, 12. Kurt McQuilkin, 13. Martin Ridge, 14. Denis Hickie, 15. Ciran Clarke.; Replacements: Reggie Corrigan (for McKeen 45'), Steve Jameson for O'Brien 72'), C. McEntee (for Brennan 72').				Referee: David McHugh

23 August 1997	Munster	15–12	Leinster	Mardyke
	Pen: O'Gara; Mahoney (3); Drop: O'Gara	Report	Pen: McGowan (4)
Leinster lineup: 1. Henry Hurley, 2. Shane Byrne, 3. Angus McKeen, 4. Steve Jameson, 5. Aaron Freeman, 6. Colin McEntee, 7. Trevor Brennan, 8. Victor Costello, 9. David O'Mahony, 10. Alan McGowan, 11. Darragh O'Mahony, 12. Kurt McQuilkin, 13. Martin Ridge, 14. Denis Hickie, 15. Ciran Clarke.; Replacements: Declan O'Brien (for Freeman 66')

30 August 1997	Leinster	23-6	Connacht	Donnybrook Stadium
	Try: Ridge; Con: McGowan; Pen: McGowan (3)	Report	Pen: Elwood (2)	Referee: D. McHugh
Leinster lineup: 1. Reggie Corrigan, 2. Shane Byrne, 3. Angus McKeen, 4. Steve Jameson, 5. Aaron Freeman, 6. Trevor Brennan, 7. Tony Goldfinch, 8. Victor Costello, 9. David O'Mahony, 10. Alan McGowan, 11. John McWeeney, 12. Kurt McQuilkin (c), 13. Martin Ridge, 14. Denis Hickie, 15. Kevin Nowlan.; Replacements: Declan O'Brien (for Jameson 70')				Referee: D. McHugh

== Heineken Cup ==
=== Pool 1 ===
Team	P	W	D	L	Tries for	Tries against	Try diff	Points for	Points against	Points diff	Pts
(France) Toulouse	6	5	0	1	25	12	13	200	121	79	10
(England) Leicester	6	4	0	2	16	14	2	163	117	46	8
(Ireland) Leinster	6	2	0	4	15	19	−4	137	167	−30	4
(Italy) Milan	6	1	0	5	15	26	−11	111	206	−95	2

6 September 1997; 15:00	Leinster (Ireland)	25–34	(France) Toulouse	Donnybrook
	Try: McGowan; O'Brien; Penalty try Con: McGowan (2); Pen: McGowan (2)	Report	Try: Marfaing; Begue; Garbajosa; Bondouy; Con: Ougier (4); Pen: Ougier (2)	Attendance: 6,300
Leinster lineup: 1. Reggie Corrigan, 2. Shane Byrne, 3. Angus McKeen, 4. Steve Jameson, 5. Aaron Freeman, 6. Trevor Brennan, 7. Tony Goldfinch, 8. Victor Costello, 9. David O'Mahony, 10. Alan McGowan, 11. John McWeeney, 12. Kurt McQuilkin, 13. Martin Ridge, 14. Denis Hickie, 15. Kevin Nowlan.; Replacements: Peter Brice, David O'Sullivan, Declan O'Brien.				Attendance: 6,300

12 September 1997; 17:30	Leinster (Ireland)	16–9	(England) Leicester Tigers	Donnybrook
	Try: Nowlan; Con: McGowan; Pen: McGowan (3)	Report	Pen: Stransky (3)	Attendance: 7,000
Leinster lineup: 1. Reggie Corrigan, 2. Shane Byrne, 3. Peter Bruce, 4. Steve Jameson, 5. Aaron Freeman, 6. Trevor Brennan, 7. David O'Sullivan, 8. Victor Costello, 9. David O'Mahony, 10. Alan McGowan, 11. John McWeeney, 12. Kurt McQuilkin, 13. Martin Ridge, 14. Denis Hickie, 15. Kevin Nowlan.; Replacements: Paul Flavin.				Attendance: 7,000

20 September 1997; 16:00	Milan (Italy)	33–32	(Ireland) Leinster	Stadio Comunale Giuriati
	Try: Properzi; Turner; Vaccari; Gómez; Cuttitta; Con: Platania; Pen: Platania (2)	Report	Try: McWeeney (2); D. O'Mahony; McGowan; Con: McGowan (3); Pen: McGowan (2)	Attendance: 1,100
Leinster lineup: 1. Paul Flavin, 2. Shane Byrne, 3. Reggie Corrigan, 4. Steve Jameson, 5. Aaron Freeman, 6. Trevor Brennan, 7. David O'Sullivan, 8. Victor Costello, 9. David O'Mahony, 10. Alan McGowan, 11. John McWeeney, 12. Kurt McQuilkin, 13. Martin Ridge, 14. Denis Hickie, 15. Kevin Nowlan.; Replacements: Emmet Byrne.				Attendance: 1,100

27 September 1997; 15:00	Leicester Tigers (England)	47–22	(Ireland) Leinster	Welford Road
	Try: Barlow; Healey; Malone; Rowntree; Greenwood; Con: Serevi (2); Pen: Stransky (3); Serevi (2); Drop: Stransky	Report	Try: McWeeney; Hickie (2); Con: McGowan (2); Pen: McGowan	Attendance: 10,392
Leinster lineup: 1. Reggie Corrigan, 2. Shane Byrne, 3. Angus McKeen, 4. Steve Jameson, 5. Aaron Freeman, 6. Trevor Brennan, 7. David O'Sullivan, 8. Victor Costello, 9. David O'Mahony, 10. Alan McGowan, 11. John McWeeney, 12. Kurt McQuilkin, 13. Martin Ridge, 14. Denis Hickie, 15. Kevin Nowlan.; Replacements: Ciaran Clarke, James Blaney, Declan O'Brien.				Attendance: 10,392

4 October 1997; 15:00	Leinster (Ireland)	23–6	(Italy) Milan	Donnybrook
	Try: Ridge (2); O'Mahony; Con: McGowan; Pen: McGowan (2)	Report	Pen: Filizzola (2)	Attendance: 5,500
Leinster lineup: 1. Reggie Corrigan, 2. Shane Byrne, 3. Emmet Byrne, 4. Steve Jameson, 5. Hubi Kos, 6. Declan O'Brien, 7. Stephen Rooney, 8. Victor Costello, 9. David O'Mahony, 10. Alan McGowan, 11. John McWeeney, 12. Kurt McQuilkin, 13. Martin Ridge, 14. Denis Hickie, 15. Kevin Nowlan.; Replacements: Ciaran Clarke, James Blaney.				Attendance: 5,500

11 October 1997; 15:20	Toulouse (France)	38–19	(Ireland) Leinster	Les Sept Deniers
	Try: Garbajosa (2); Bondouy (2); Martin; Con: Delaigue (2)	Report	Try: McWeeney; Con: McGowan; Pen: McGowan (4)	Attendance: 7,000
Leinster lineup: 1. Reggie Corrigan, 2. Shane Byrne, 3. Angus McKeen, 4. Steve Jameson, 5. Hubi Kos, 6. Trevor Brennan, 7. Stephen Rooney, 8. Victor Costello, 9. David O'Mahony, 10. Alan McGowan, 11. John McWeeney, 12. Kurt McQuilkin, 13. Martin Ridge, 14. Denis Hickie, 15. Kevin Nowlan.; Replacements: Richard Governey, Emmet Byrne.				Attendance: 7,000
