= 1995–1997 FIRA Trophy =

European rugby union championship

1995-97 FIRA Trophy
- Date: 19 November 1995 – 23 May 1997
- Countries: Belgium; France; Germany; Italy; Morocco; Portugal; Romania; Russia; Spain; Tunisia

Tournament statistics
- Champions: Italy
- Matches played: 41

The 1995–1997 FIRA Trophy was the 31st edition of the European rugby union championship for national teams. The 1995-97 edition was arranged once again with a new format.

Due preparations for the 1995 Rugby World Cup, France, Italy and Romania did not participate in the 1994-95 season of the competition, so for that season a Preliminary Tournament was arranged with ten other teams. The higher ranked seven teams were admitted to this tournament, with France, Italy and Romania.

The tournament was undergoing a difficult time, due to decreased interest from the strongest teams: France usually sent reserve teams, and Italy were playing matches with the likes of Australia, England and Wales.

This is evident looking the results and the programme. France played the first round robin with their Military team, Italy and Romania did not arrange a match for this tournament, but played a match on neutral ground against Argentina for the "Latina Cup". Italy sent two lower level teams to play (during the same weekend) the last two matches. The previous edition's final between Italy and France was played in March 1997, while the 1996-97 edition was already half completed.

This edition was the first ever triumph of Italy in the competition, defeating France by 40-32 in the final, thus cementing their claims to be the sixth European rugby nation powerhouse. Italy had started to play in this tournament with France in 1966 and, despite some close results, had never previously beaten their strong rivals. Italy's win, shortly after France had won the 1997 Five Nations Championship, was a historical feat that proved to be crucial for Italy's admission at the Six Nations Championship in 2000.

== First Division ==
=== Preliminary tournament ===
Three directly admitted

- France
- Italy
- Romania

And seven qualified from the preliminary tournament

- Belgium
- Morocco
- Poland
- Portugal
- Russia
- Spain
- Tunisia

=== Pool A ===
| Place | Nation | Games | | | | Points | | | Table points |
| Place | Nation | played | won | drawn | lost | for | against | diff. | Table points |
|---|---|---|---|---|---|---|---|---|---|
| 1 | France | 4 | 4 | 0 | 0 | 194 | 29 | +165 | 12 |
| 2 | Spain | 4 | 3 | 0 | 1 | 91 | 90 | +1 | 10 |
| 3 | Russia | 4 | 2 | 0 | 2 | 37 | 95 | -58 | 8 |
| 4 | Morocco | 4 | 1 | 0 | 3 | 41 | 70 | -29 | 6 |
| 5 | Tunisia | 4 | 0 | 0 | 4 | 11 | 78 | -67 | 2 |

- France qualified to Final

19 November 1995

| France Military | 33 - 12 | Russia |

Blanc-Mesnil
Referee: (Italy) G. Giacomel

10 December 1995

| Tunisia | 11 - 20 | Morocco |

Sousse
Referee: (France) A. Fernandez

6 January 1996

| Morocco | 8 - 22 | France Military |

Casablanca
Referee: (Spain) I. Atorrasagasti

16 March 1996

| Morocco | 3 - 24 | Spain |

Casablanca
Referee: (France) D. Salles

16 March 1996

| France Military | 58 - 0 | Tunisia |

Albertville
Referee: (Portugal) J. Mendes da Silva

31 March 1996

| Spain | 9 - 81 | France XV |

Estadi Baldiri Aleu, Sant Boi de Llobregat

14 April 1996

| Spain | 52 - 6 | Russia |
| Try: Velazco Querol, Gallastegui, Souto, Tayeb (2), Gerendiaga Nanclares (3); Con: Gerendiaga Nanclares (4); Pen: Gerendiaga Nanclares (3) | | Pen: Yakovlev (2) |

Campo Universitario, Madrid

28 April 1996

| Spain | 6 – 0 withdraw | Tunisia |

Madrid

11 May 1996

| Morocco | 10 - 13 | Russia |

Safi
Referee: (Spain) I. Aguirre

19 May 1996

| Tunisia | 0 – 6 withdraw | Russia |

Tunis

=== Pool B ===
| Place | Nation | Games | | | | Points | | | Table points |
| Place | Nation | played | won | drawn | lost | for | against | diff. | Table points |
|---|---|---|---|---|---|---|---|---|---|
| 1 | Italy | 4 | 4 | 0 | 0 | 249 | 35 | +214 | 12 |
| 2 | Romania | 4 | 3 | 0 | 1 | 218 | 54 | +164 | 10 |
| 3 | Portugal | 4 | 2 | 0 | 2 | 70 | 177 | -107 | 8 |
| 4 | Poland | 4 | 1 | 0 | 3 | 61 | 195 | -134 | 6 |
| 5 | Belgium | 4 | 0 | 0 | 4 | 43 | 180 | -137 | 4 |

- Italy qualified to the final

Point system: try 4 pt, conversion: 2 pt., penalty kick 3 pt. drop 3 pt
Click "show" for more info about match (scorers, line-up etc.)

| 21 October 1995 | Italy | 40 - 3 | Romania | Stadium Etcheverri, Buenos Aires |
| | Try: Checchinato 2, Mazzariol, Moscardi, Roselli; Con: Bonomi 3 Pen: Bonomi 3 | | Pen: Besarau | Referee: Efraim Sklar (Argentina) |
| Italy: 15. Paolo Vaccari, 14. Fabio Roselli, 13. Marco Platania, 12. Ivan Francescato, 11. Francesco Mazzariol, 10. Massimo Bonomi, 9. Alessandro Troncon, 8. Carlo Checchinato, 7. Andrea Sgorlon, 6. Massimo Giovanelli, 5. Mark Giacheri, 4. Pierpaolo Pedroni, 3. Andrea Castellani, 2. Carlo Orlandi, 1. Massimo Cuttitta (cap.) - replacements: 16. Alessandro Moscardi, 17. Orazio Arancio, 18. Carlo Caione, 19. Gabriel Filizzola | | | | Referee: Efraim Sklar (Argentina) |
Romania: 15. Valentin Maftei, 14. Gheorghe Solomie, 13. Marius Nedelcu, 12. Tiberiu Luca, 11. Radu Fugigi, 10. Vasile Besărău, 9. Vasile Flutur, 8. Adrian Gîrbu, 7. Alexandru Gealapu, 6. Andrei Gurănescu, 5. Constantin Cojocariu (cap.), 4. Micușor Marin, 3. Adrian Saălăgeanu, 2. Ionel Negreci, 1. Gabriel Vlad - replacements: 16. Ionel Rotaru, 17. Cătălin Drăguceanu, 18. Dragoș Niculae, 19. Constantin Dragnea

28 October 1995

| Poland | 30 - 10 | Belgium |

Łódź

| 3 March 1996 | Portugal | 3 - 64 | Italy | Lisbon University Stadium, Lisbon |
| | Pen: N. Gomes | | Try: Babbo (2), Domínguez; Francescato (2), Mazzucato, Orlandi, Platania (2), Properzi; Con: Domínguez | Referee: (Spain) García Mostaza |
| Portugal: 15. José Gomes, 14. Pedro Murinello, 13. Nuno Durão, 12. Nuno Mourão, 11. Rohan Hoffmann, 10. Nuno Gomes, 9. Luís Pissarra, 8. Pedro Castro, 7. António Cunha, 6. João Catulo, 5. José Luís Rodrigues, 4. Pedro Rogério Arsénio, 3. Joaquim Ferreira, 2. Paulo Silva, 1. José Pedro Costa - replacements: 16. Vasco Durão, 17. Éric Galvão, 18. Alexandre Lima | | | | Referee: (Spain) García Mostaza |
Italy: 15. Massimo Ravazzolo, 14. Nicola Mazzucato, 13. Marco Platania, 12. Ivan Francescato, 11. Simone Babbo, 10. Diego Dominguez, 9. Gianluca Guidi, 8. Orazio Arancio, 7. Andrea Sgorlon, 6. Carlo Caione, 5. Roberto Favaro, 4. Andrea Gritti, 3. Franco Properzi, 2. Carlo Orlandi, 1. Massimo Cuttitta (cap.) - replacements: 16. Piergiorgi Menapace, 17. Riccardo Piovan, 18. Francesco Mazzariol, 19. Walter Cristofoletto

16 March 1996

| Belgium | 18 - 29 | Portugal |

King Baudouin Stadium, Brussels

13 April 1996

| Romania | 92 - 0 | Portugal |
| Try: Radoi (2), Vlad, Fugigi, Gontineac, Sîrbu, Slusariuc, Rotaru (5), Tufa; Con: Popisteanu (12); Pen: Popisteanu |

Stadionul Steaua II, Bucharest
Attendance: 1,000
Referee: (Italy) A. Condorelli

- This was the heaviest defeat of Portugal until their loss to New Zealand (108-13) at the 2007 Rugby World Cup

19 April 1996

| Romania A | 83 - 5 | Belgium |

Stadionul Dinamo, Bucharest

27 April 1996

| Portugal | 38 - 3 | Poland |

Lisbon University Stadium, Lisbon

12 May 1996

| Poland | 9 - 40 | Romania |

Sochaczew

24 May 1996

| Belgium | 10 - 38 | Emerging Italy |

King Baudouin Stadium, Brussels

25 May 1996

| Italy A | 107 - 19 | Poland |

Otello Gerli Stadium, Udine
Referee: (France) D. Artigeas

=== Final ===
22 March 1997

| France | 32 - 40 | Italy |
| Try: 14' Penalty try 52' e 82' Bondouy; 79' Sadourny; Con: 14', 52' e 82' Aucagne; Pen: 20', 24' Aucagne | | Try: 5' I. Francescato; 34' Gardner; 56' Croci; 74' Vaccari; Con: 5', 34', 56' e 74' Domínguez; Pen: 17', 30', 62' e 68' Domínguez |

Stade Lesdiguières, Grenoble
Attendance: 15,000
Referee: (Ireland) David McHugh

France
Jean-Luc Sadourny
Stéphane Ougier
Yann Delaigue
Pierre Bondouy
Philippe Saint-André
David Aucagne
Guy Accoceberry
Fabien Pelous (c.)
Arnaud Costes
Philippe Benetton
Hugues Miorin
Olivier Merle
Franck Tournaire
Marc Dal Maso
Marc de Rougemont

Serge Betsen
Raphaël Ibañez

Pierre Villepreux

| FB | 15 | FB |
| RW | 14 | RW |
| OC | 13 | OC |
| IC | 12 | IC |
| LW | 11 | LW |
| FH | 10 | FH |
| SH | 9 | SH |
| N8 | 8 | N8 |
| OF | 7 | OF |
| BF | 6 | BF |
| RL | 5 | RL |
| LL | 4 | LL |
| TP | 3 | TP |
| HK | 2 | HK |
| LP | 1 | LP |
Substitutions:
Coaches

Italy
Javier Pértile
Paolo Vaccari
Stefano Bordon
Ivan Francescato
Marcello Cuttitta
Diego Dominguez
Alessandro Troncon
Julian Gardner
Andrea Sgorlon
Massimo Giovanelli (c.)
Giambattista Croci
Walter Cristofoletto
Franco Properzi
Carlo Orlandi
Massimo Cuttitta

Francesco Mazzariol
Gianluca Guidi

Georges Coste

== Second Division ==
=== Pool 1 (Gold) ===
| Place | Nation | Games | | | | Points | | | Table points |
| Place | Nation | played | won | drawn | lost | for | against | diff. | Table points |
|---|---|---|---|---|---|---|---|---|---|
| 1 | Netherlands | 4 | 3 | 1 | 0 | 107 | 31 | +76 | 11 |
| 2 | Georgia | 4 | 3 | 0 | 1 | 40 | 61 | -21 | 10 |
| 3 | Germany | 4 | 2 | 0 | 2 | 52 | 48 | +4 | 8 |
| 4 | Czech Republic | 4 | 1 | 0 | 3 | 62 | 80 | -18 | 6 |
| 5 | Denmark | 4 | 0 | 1 | 3 | 37 | 75 | -38 | 4 |

23 September 1995

| Germany | 28 - 17 | Czech Republic |

Hanover

15 October 1995

| Georgia | 14 - 3 | Germany |
| Try: Iurini; Pen: E. Dzagnidze, D. Dzagnidze (2) | | Pen: Kocher |

National Stadium, Tbilisi

29 October 1995

| Denmark | 20 - 20 | Netherlands |

Copenhagen

19 November 1995

| Denmark | 0 - W | Georgia |

Aalborg
Referee: Zboralsky (France)

GEO duly arrived but DNK did not take the frozen field claiming it was not safe Reference: Georgia Rugby Record 1959-2009, p 152,155

http://issuu.com/qaflan/docs/ka-mataine50

24 November 1995

| Netherlands | 55 - 3 | Georgia |

Castricum

30 March 1996

| Czech Republic | 3 - 26 | Netherlands |

Říčany

12 April 1996

| Georgia | 20 - 3 | Czech Republic |
| Try: Iurini, Jimsheladze, Kavtarachvili; Con: Modebadze; Pen: Machitidze | | Pen: Stourac |

Vake Stadium, Tbilisi

21 April 1996

| Netherlands | 6 - 5 | Germany |

Sportpark Berestein, Hilversum

27 April 1996

| Czech Republic | 39 - 6 | Denmark |

Říčany

12 May 1996

| Germany | 16 - 11 | Denmark |

Hanover

=== Pool 2 (Silver) ===
| Place | Nation | Games | | | | Points | | | Table points |
| Place | Nation | played | won | drawn | lost | for | against | diff. | Table points |
|---|---|---|---|---|---|---|---|---|---|
| 1 | Yugoslavia | 2 | 2 | 0 | 0 | 69 | 21 | +48 | 6 |
| 2 | Andorra | 2 | 1 | 0 | 1 | 25 | 38 | -13 | 4 |
| 3 | Bulgaria | 2 | 0 | 0 | 2 | 17 | 52 | -35 | 2 |

24 March 1996

| Yugoslavia | 30 - 12 | Andorra |

20 April 1996

| Andorra | 13 - 8 | Bulgaria |

Andorra-la-Vella

18 June 1996

| Bulgaria | 9 - 39 | Yugoslavia |

== Third Division ==
=== Pool 1 ===
| Place | Nation | Games | | | | Points | | | Table points |
| Place | Nation | played | won | drawn | lost | for | against | diff. | Table points |
|---|---|---|---|---|---|---|---|---|---|
| 1 | Ukraine | 3 | 3 | 0 | 0 | 84 | 11 | +73 | 9 |
| 2 | Latvia | 3 | 2 | 0 | 1 | 50 | 44 | +6 | 7 |
| 3 | Moldova | 3 | 1 | 0 | 2 | 20 | 61 | -41 | 5 |
| 4 | Lithuania | 3 | 0 | 0 | 3 | 38 | 76 | -38 | 3 |

1 May 1996

| Ukraine | 38 - 0 | Moldova |

Kyiv

11 May 1996

| Latvia | 34 - 20 | Lithuania |

10 October 1996

| Latvia | 3 - 19 | Ukraine |

Riga

21 October 1996

| Latvia | 13 - 5 | Moldova |

Riga

1996

| Lithuania | 8 - 27 | Ukraine |

Vilnius

1996

| Lithuania | 10 - 15 | Moldova |

=== Pool 2 ===
| Place | Nation | Games | | | | Points | | | Table points |
| Place | Nation | played | won | drawn | lost | for | against | diff. | Table points |
|---|---|---|---|---|---|---|---|---|---|
| 1 | Austria | 2 | 1 | 0 | 1 | 31 | 20 | +11 | 4 |
| 2 | Hungary | 2 | 1 | 1 | 1 | 42 | 32 | +10 | 4 |
| 3 | Slovenia | 2 | 1 | 0 | 1 | 23 | 44 | -21 | 4 |

5 November 1995

| Austria | 21 - 8 | Hungary |

Wien

20 April 1996

| Slovenia | 12 - 10 | Austria |

11 May 1996

| Hungary | 34 - 11 | Slovenia |

Kecskemét

=== Pool 3 ===
| Place | Nation | Games | | | | Points | | | Table points |
| Place | Nation | played | won | drawn | lost | for | against | diff. | Table points |
|---|---|---|---|---|---|---|---|---|---|
| 1 | Croatia | 2 | 2 | 0 | 0 | 37 | 18 | +19 | 6 |
| 2 | Israel | 2 | 1 | 0 | 1 | 26 | 33 | -7 | 4 |
| 3 | Luxembourg | 2 | 0 | 0 | 2 | 24 | 36 | -12 | 2 |

28 October 1995

| Luxembourg | 12 - 16 | Croatia |

Luxembourg

7 April 1996

| Israel | 20 - 12 | Luxembourg |

Tel Aviv

27 April 1996

| Croatia | 21 - 6 | Israel |

Split

== Bibliography ==
- (in Italian) Francesco Volpe, Valerio Vecchiarelli (2000), 2000 Italia in Meta, Storia della nazionale italiana di rugby dagli albori al Sei Nazioni, GS Editore (2000) ISBN 88-87374-40-6.
- (in Italian) Francesco Volpe, Paolo Pacitti (Author), Rugby 2000, GTE Gruppo Editorale (1999).
- "European Cup FIRA Trophy First Division 1994/96". The Rugby Archive. 13 December 2018. Archived from the original on 28 February 2022.
- "European Cup FIRA Trophy Second Division 1994/96". The Rugby Archive. 13 December 2018. Archived from the original on 28 February 2022.
- "European Cup FIRA Trophy Third Division 1994/96". The Rugby Archive. 13 December 2018. Archived from the original on 28 February 2022.
