= Tofan =

Tofan is a surname. Notable people with the surname include:

- Cătălin Tofan (born 1969), Romanian footballer
- Costinel Tofan (born 1996), Romanian footballer
- George Tofan (1880–1920), Austro-Hungarian, Moldavian and Romanian writer and official
- Ionuț Tofan (born 1977), Romanian rugby union footballer
- Ștefan Tofan (born 1965), Romanian rugby union football player
- Vasile Tofan (born 1982), Moldovan investor and businessman
