= Gallastegui =

Gallastegui is a Basque surname. Notable people with the surname include:

- Miguel Gallastegui (1918–2019), Spanish pelota player
- Modesto Arámbarri Gallastegui (1902–1988), Spanish military personnel
- Aratz Gallastegui (born 1976), Spanish rugby union player
