= Pertile =

Pertile is the family name of:

- Aureliano Pertile (1885–1952), Italian opera singer
- Ivo Pertile (born 1971), Italian ski jumper
- Elda Pértile (born 1953), Argentine politician
- Javier Pértile (born 1968), Argentine-Italian rugby union player
- Lino Pertile (born 1940), Italian linguist and professor
- Merle Pertile (1941–1997), American model and actress
- Ruggero Pertile (born 1974), Italian long-distance runner
