= Francescato =

Francescato is a surname. Notable people with the surname include:

- Donata Francescato (born 1944), Italian community psychologist and academic
- Enrico Francescato (born 1993), Italian rugby union player
- Grazia Francescato (born 1946), Italian politician, journalist, and activist
- Ivan Francescato (1967–1999), Italian rugby union player
