= Enrico Bacchin =

Italian rugby union player

- Full name: Enrico Bacchin
- Born: 28 November 1992 (age 33) San Dona di Piave, Italy
- Height: 1.82 m (6 ft 0 in)
- Weight: 97 kg (15 st 4 lb; 214 lb)

Rugby union career
- Position(s): centre, Fly-half
- Current team: Treviso
Youth career
- -2012: San Donà
Senior career
Years	Team	Apps	(Points)
2012–2013	San Donà	16	(51)
2013–2014	Mogliano	24	(15)
2014	→Treviso	3	(0)
2014–2016	Treviso	34	(15)
2016–2018	Petrarca	21	(5)
2018–2020	San Donà	19	(6)
- Correct as of 10 September 2015
International career
Years	Team	Apps	(Points)
2014	Emerging Italy	2	(0)
2015–2016	Italy	5	(0)
- Correct as of 11 October 2015

Enrico Bacchin (born 28 November 1992) is a retired Italian rugby union player who played as a centre and he represented Italy on 5 occasions, in 2015. On 10 September 2015, he was named in the squad for the 2015 Rugby World Cup in substitution of Luca Morisi.

Born in San Dona di Piave, Enrico played locally for San Dona rugby club, which is known for its youth academy. Later he joined the first team, of which in his first year, the club achieved promotion to the National Championship of Excellence. The next season, he transferred to Mogliano, later gaining a permit to Treviso. The next season, he joined Benetton Treviso, along with fellow San Dona team members Amar Kudin and Matteo Zanusso. From 2014 to 2016, he played for Benetton Treviso in the Pro14.
