= Livorno (disambiguation) =

Livorno is a city in Tuscany and the capital of the Province of Livorno.

Livorno may also refer to:

== Places ==
- Livorno Ferraris, a comune in Piedmont
- Livorno, Suriname

== Sports ==
- US Livorno 1915, a football club
- Libertas Livorno, a basketball club
- Pallacanestro Don Bosco Livorno, a basketball club
- Rugby Livorno 1931, a rugby union club

== Other uses ==
- Leghorn chicken, a bird breed
- 33rd Infantry Regiment "Livorno", a former unit of the Italian Army
- 4th Infantry Division "Livorno", a unit of the Royal Italian Army during World War II
- 236784 Livorno, an asteroid in the Solar System
