= Stefano Saviozzi =

Former Italian rugby union player

Stefano Saviozzi (born 4 March 1975 in Pisa) was an Italian rugby union player and is a current coach. He played as a hooker and as a flanker.

Saviozzi first played for Rugby Livorno, from 1994/95 to 1995/96, moving afterwards to Benetton Treviso, where he would play from 1996/97 to 2000/01. He won four Italian Premiership titles, in 1996/97, 1997/98, 1998/99 and 2000/01. He then played two seasons at Rugby Parma, from 2001/02 to 2002/03, one season at Rugby Leonessa 1928, in 2003/04, and another one at Rugby Viadana, in 2004/05. Since 2005/06, he plays for San Marco Rugby, who changed their name for Mogliano Rugby, in 2009/10. He left competition in 2010/11. He has been the coach of the youth squad of Mogliano since 2011/12.

Saviozzi had 14 caps for Italy, from 1998 to 2002, scoring 3 tries, 15 points in aggregate. He was called for the 1999 Rugby World Cup, playing two games but remaining scoreless.
