= Luca Petrozzi =

Italian rugby union player

- Born: 12 March 1995 (age 31) Bromley, United Kingdom
- Height: 1.73 m (5 ft 8 in)
- Weight: 85 kg (13 st 5 lb; 187 lb)

Rugby union career
- Position: Scrum-Half
- Current team: London Scottish
Youth career
- 2013−2014: Benetton Treviso
Senior career
Years	Team	Apps	(Points)
2014−2016	University of Bath		
2016−2017	San Donà	2	(0)
2017−2018	University of Bath		
2018−2020	San Donà	28	(40)
2019−2020	→Benetton	5	(0)
2020−2022	Benetton	19	(0)
2022−	London Scottish		
- Correct as of 5 Mar 2022
International career
Years	Team	Apps	(Points)
2015	Italy Under 20	3	(0)
2018	Italy Sevens	11	(10)

Luca Petrozzi (born 12 March 1995, in Bromley) is an English born Italian rugby union player. His usual position is as a Scrum-half, and he currently plays for London Scottish.

For 2019–20 Pro14 season, he was named as Additional Player for Benetton. In 2020–21 Pro14 season he signed for Benetton until 2022.

In January 2015, Petrozzi was also named in the Italy Under 20 squad for the 2015 Six Nations Under 20s Championship and in 2018 in the Italy Sevens squad for the 2018 Rugby Europe Sevens Grand Prix Series.
