= Jaco Erasmus =

- Born: 31 July 1979 (age 47) Empangeni, South Africa
- Height: 6 ft 6 in (1.98 m)
- Weight: 231 lb (105 kg; 16 st 7 lb)

Rugby union career
- Position: Flanker
Senior career
Years	Team	Apps	(Points)
2001	Natal Sharks	1	(0)
2001−2002	Bologna	18	(0)
2002−2003	Mogliano	18	(25)
2003−2004	Treviso	5	(0)
2004−2006	Roma Olimpic	43	(110)
2006−2010	Viadana	60	(80)
2010−2011	Aironi	14	(0)
2011−2013	Calvisano	41	(40)
2013−2018	San Donà	82	(20)
International career
Years	Team	Apps	(Points)
2008	Italy	3	
2010	Italy A	1	

Jaco Erasmus (born 31 July 1979) is a South African-born Italian rugby union naturalized player. He plays as a flanker.

He played for Rugby Viadana where he gained qualification for the Italian national team. In March 2008 he received a call up to the national team by fellow South African Nick Mallett. He currently plays for Rugby Calvisano

He has currently 3 caps for Italy, all in 2008, 2 of them coming in the 2008 Six Nations Championship.
