= Michele Sutto =

Italian rugby union player

- Born: 11 February 1986 (age 40) Italy
- Height: 1.98 m (6 ft 6 in)
- Weight: 100 kg (220 lb; 15 st 10 lb)

Rugby union career
- Position: Lock
Youth career
- Benetton Treviso
Senior career
Years	Team	Apps	(Points)
2006−2010	Benetton Treviso	13	(0)
2010−2012	Petrarca Padova	39	(0)
2012−2016	Fiamme Oro	61	(10)
2015	→Zebre	4	(0)
2017−2020	San Donà	25	(5)
2020	Paese	-	(-)
2020−2024	Mogliano	19	(0)
- Correct as of 29 June 2020
- Correct as of 29 June 2020

Michele Sutto (born 11 February 1986) was an Italian rugby union player. His usual position is as a Lock and he played for Mogliano in Top12.

In 2014–15 Pro12 and 2015–16 Pro14 seasons, he was named Additional Player for Zebre.
