= Rugby Livorno 1931 =

Italian rugby union team

- Full name: Rugby Livorno 1931
- Union: Italian Rugby Federation
- Founded: 1931
- Location: Livorno, Italy
- Ground(s): Carlo Montano Stadium (Capacity: 1,000)
- President: Gianni Riccetti
- League(s): Serie B
1st kit	2nd kit

Official website
- www.rugbylivorno1931.com

Rugby Livorno 1931 is an Italian rugby union team from Livorno. The club was founded in 1931 (hence that year in the club's name) and spent several seasons in the Italy's top tier championship.

Rugby Livorno 1931's best placement in the Italian Premiership was 6th place in 1989/90 and they played overall 17 seasons in the main division. Currently the team plays in Serie B, the third division of Italian rugby union.

== Notable former players ==
- Stefano Bettarello
- Michael Cheika
- Andrea De Rossi
- Fabio Gaetaniello
- Gianluca Guidi
- Marzio Innocenti
- David Knox
- Andrea Lovotti
- Matteo Mazzantini
- Stefano Saviozzi
