= Teodor Coman =

Romania international rugby union player

- Born: Teodor Coman circa 1962 (age 63–64) Romania

Rugby union career
- Position: Scrum-half
Senior career
Years	Team	Apps	(Points)
1982-1998	CSA Steaua București		
International career
Years	Team	Apps	(Points)
1984–1992	Romania	11	(4)

Teodor Coman (born circa 1962) is a former Romanian rugby union football player. He played as a scrum-half.

== Club career ==
At club level, he played for CSA Steaua București.

== International career ==
Coman was first capped for Romania during the 1985-1987 FIRA Trophy, during the match against Spain in Madrid, on 16 December 1984. He was also called up for the Romania team at the 1987 Rugby World Cup, however, he did not play any match due to Mircea Paraschiv being the starter scrum-half during the tournament. Although he was not called up for the 1991 Rugby World Cup squad, he still played for Romania, with his last international cap being during the match against France on 28 May 1992 in Le Havre.

== Honours ==
=== Team honours ===
Liga Națională de Rugby:

- CSA Steaua București:
  - Champion in 1979/80, 1980/81, 1982/83, 1983/84, 1984/85, 1986/87, 1987/88, 1988/89, 1991/92;
  - Runner up in 1985/86, 1989/90, 1992/93, 1994/95, 1997/98.

Romania

- FIRA Trophy:
  - Third place in 1985-87, 1987-89 and 1990-92

=== Individual honours ===
- Master of Sports of Romania in 1992
