= Gianluca Guidi =

Italian rugby union coach and former player

Gianluca Guidi (born 2 February 1968) is an Italian rugby union coach and former player. He played as a scrum-half.

Guidi was born in Livorno. He played almost all his entire career at Rugby Livorno 1931, from 1989–1990 to 1996–1997, spending a single season at L'Aquila Rugby in 1997–1998, and once again at Rugby Livorno 1931, from 1998–1999 to 2000–2001.

He had 5 caps for Italy, from 1996 to 1997, without scoring. He played as a substitute at the historical win at the 1995-1997 FIRA Trophy final by 40–32 over France.

After finishing his player career, he became a coach. He was the head coach of Rugby Livorno 1931, from 1999–2000 to 2000–2001, and of Cecina, from 2001–2002 to 2004–2005. He was also a head coach for Italy youth categories, being in charge of the U-19 team, in 2002–2003, the U-18 team in 2003–2004, and once again of the U-19 side from 2004–2005 to 2005–2006. Meanwhile, he was also the coach of Tirreno, in 2005–2006. He was in charge of the U-20 side from 2006 to 2008, becoming head coach of Italy A in 2008, which he was until 2012. He was once again in charge of the U-20 team in 2012–2013.

He became a clubs coach afterwards. He was the head coach of Rugby Calvisano for two seasons, winning the Italian Championship twice in 2013–2014 and 2014–2015. He was the coach of Zebre for two seasons, from 2015–2016 to 2016–2017, moving then to Fiamme Oro Rugby, which he coaches since 2017–2018.
