= Zimnicea High School =

School in Romania

Coordinates: 43.6666°N 25.3527°E

Zimnicea High School (Romanian: Liceul Teoretic Zimnicea) is a high school located at 1A Turnu Măgurele Street in central Zimnicea, Teleorman County, Romania. Its current building opened in December 1977, the previous location having been destroyed in the March earthquake. It was built with funds from the government of Switzerland.

== History ==
Zimnicea Theoretical High School, in the town of Zimnicea, has been operating in its current location for 31 years, being the result of a donation from the Swiss Government, made to the town following the devastating earthquake of March 4, 1977. The construction of this group of buildings took a record 112 days, causing the high school to be inaugurated in the same year, 1977, on December 17, in the presence of the Swiss ambassador to Bucharest and representatives of the Ministry of Education and Training of the Socialist Republic of Romania, the official name of the country at the time.
