= Jean-Pierre Fauvel =

France international rugby union player

- Born: 9 February 1956 (age 70) Castillonnès, France
- Height: 6 ft 1 in (185 cm)
- Weight: 208 lb (94 kg)

Rugby union career
- Position: Flanker
International career
Years	Team	Apps	(Points)
1980	France	1	(0)

Jean-Pierre Fauvel (born 9 February1956) is a French former international rugby union player.

Fauvel grew up in Castillonnès and played his club rugby with SC Tulle, while employed as a caretaker at the Alexandre-Cueille stadium. He was a member of France's 1980 tour of South Africa and gained his solitary France cap as a flanker against Romania at Bucharest during the 1980–81 FIRA Trophy.

Post rugby, Fauvel worked as a sports instructor.

== See also ==
- List of France national rugby union players
