= Rugby San Donà =

Italian rugby union club

(Italy) Rugby San Donà
- Full name: Rugby San Donà S.S.D.r.l
- Union: Italian Rugby Federation
- Founded: 1959; 67 years ago
- Location: San Donà di Piave, Italy
- Ground: Stadio Romolo Pacifici (Capacity: 1,500)
- President: Alberto Marusso
- Coach: Craig Green
- Captain: Paul Derbyshire
- League: Top12
- 2017–18: 4th
1st kit	2nd kit

Official website
- www.rugbysandona.it

Rugby San Donà is an Italian rugby union club based in San Donà di Piave, in the Metropolitan City of Venice.

“Associazione Rugby San Donà" was founded in 1959, by a group of passionate pioneers, and, in the same year affiliated to the Italian Rugby Federation. The first team played in serie A since the 1979–80 season and in 4 times reached the semi-finals for the Coppa Italia title. During the years, there were various players who had test caps for the Italy national team, both in the main team and in the youth teams, and several players were also called up in inter-regional and representative teams. Among all the players, some notable players who captained the Italy national team: Adriano Fedrigo, Giancarlo Pivetta and Andrea Sgorlon.

== History ==
Rugby arrived in San Donà di Piave during the late 1950s by initiative of some students, led by Mario Pacifici and Corrado Teso, who learnt rugby union at the Brandolini College, in Oderzo. After persuading some friends, they founded Associazione Rugby San Donà debuting officially in the 1960–61 season.

The success arrived and after two seasons, the team was promoted to serie B at the end of the 1962–63 season.

At the end of the 1975–76 season, the club's stint in serie A, where Rugby San Donà remained for some years, deserving the appreciation of all the rugby union environment, in the various structurations that the top championship had. The first team played four times in Serie A1 final stage for the Scudetto in the 1989–90, 1991–92, 1992–93 and 1995–96 seasons.

Various players represented the Italian team: between the most representatives there are the captains: Adriano Fedrigo (41 caps from 1972); Giancarlo Pivetta, prop for Italy between 1979 and 1993 (46 caps for Italy and two World Cup caps: 1987 and 1991, the latter also as captain) and coach of the senior team in the 2004 and 2005 seasons; Andrea Sgorlon (37 caps between 1993 and 1999, a World Cup cap in 1995 and European Champion in the 1995–1997 FIRA Trophy). During the 1992–93 season, South African representative Joël Stransky, who was part of the 1995 World Cup winning team, played for the club, which arrived in the second place at the end of the regular season, arriving at the quarter-finals beating Tarvisium before being defeated by Benetton Treviso in the semi-final during the home and away match with the results being 27–28 and 17–25.

San Donà remained in the top division until the early 2000s, when professionalism and the transformation of the top league in Super 10 arrived in the 2001–02 season, the club was relegated in Serie A, where they remained until the 2004–05 season.

2005 was a year of big changes for Rugby San Donà: the team was relegated to Serie B after the defeat in the last play-off match, which made the club rebuild itself and solidify its bases, variating its composition to the technical staff, to dedicate to the feeder team and to revitalise the main team. The Amatori group was formed, led by numerous young local entrepreneurs, among them some former players, with the precise goal to bring the club back to its old times of glory. Such attentions brought the first results: after only a year in Serie B, l'Amatori Rugby San Donà returned again to compete in the Serie A championship during the 2006–07 season.

The 2011–12 Serie A1 season marked San Donà's return in the top series, thanks to the final won in Prato against Fiamme Oro with the 13–9 score, thus, earning the promotion in Eccellenza. From the 2012–13 season, the club changed logo and name to Rugby San Donà, the club stably takes part to the Eccellenza championship under the Lafert San Donà name, due to sponsorship. During the 2017–18 season, the team arrives fifth in the championship ladder, almost making it to the play-off semi-finals, and won the Trofeo Eccellenza in the final against Fiamme Oro with the score 24–0. In the titular team which entered to the pitch at Battaglini in Rovigo, led by the coach Zane Ansell, featuring the Italian representative players Paul Derbyshire, Jaco Erasmus, Andrea Pratichetti, who scored a try, and Matteo Falsaperla, Italy sevens captain.

== Current squad (2019–20) ==
San Donà Rugby 2019–2020 squad (Note: Taking into account signings and departures head of 2019–20 season.) (Note: Also addidional player with Pro14 team Benetton.)
**Props**: (Italy) Andrea Ceccato; (Italy) Alessio Ceglie; (Italy) Pasqual Elia; (Italy) Antonio Ros; (South Africa) Linda Thwala; (Italy) Luca Zanusso; (Italy) Yader Chalonec; **Hookers**: (New Zealand) Greg Bauer; (Italy) Marco Boscain; (Argentina) Jorge Castro; (Samoa) Valentine Meachen; (Italy) Gianluca Vian; **Locks**: (Italy) Gustavo Mozzato; (Argentina) Pedro Ortega; (Italy) Paolo Steolo; (Italy) Michele Sutto	**Back row**: (Italy) Giorgio Bacchin; (Italy) Giovanni Carraretto; (Italy) Mattia Catelan; (Italy) **Paul Derbyshire**(c); (Italy) Alvise Menconi; (Italy) Nicolò Zuliani; **Scrum-halves**: (Italy) Enrico Francescato; (Italy) Pietro Pilla; (Italy) Luca Petrozzi; **Fly-halves**: (Italy) **Enrico Bacchin**; (England) Samuel Katz; (Italy) Edward Reeves	**Centres**: (Italy) Roberto Berletti; (Romania) Bogdan Iovu; (Italy) Enrico Jacono; **Wings**: (Italy) Andrea Bronzini; (Italy) Francesco Crisantemo; (Italy) Alberto Dell'Antonio; (Italy) Dario Schiabel; **Fullbacks**: (Scotland) Lyle Cameron Scott
(c) denotes the team captain, **Bold** denotes internationally capped players.^{*} denotes players qualified to play for Italy on residency or dual nationality. Players and their allocated positions from the San Donà website.

== Notable players ==
Here are listed some international and domestic-level notable players who played for San Donà:

- (Italy) James Ambrosini
- (Italy) Steven Bortolussi
- (Italy) Enrico Bacchin
- (Italy) Roberto Bertetti
- (Italy) Aldo Birchall
- (Italy) Paul Derbyshire
- (Italy) Jaco Erasmus
- (Italy) Adriano Fedrigo
- (Italy) Gino Lupini
- (Italy) Gustavo Milano
- (Italy) Pino Patelli
- (Italy) Giancarlo Pivetta
- (Italy) Andrea Pratichetti
- (Italy) Andrea Sgorlon
- (Italy) Ruggero Trevisan
- (Italy) Gianmarco Vian
- (Italy) Michael Van Vuuren
- (Italy) Matteo Zanusso
- (Romania) Bogdan Iovu
- (Argentina) Gonzalo Padrò
- (Argentina) Fabián Turnes
- (Germany) Umberto Pilla
- (England) Matt Cornwell
- (South Africa) Joel Stransky
- (South Africa) Hilton Lobberts
- (Tonga) Maama Molitika

== See also ==
- San Donà di Piave
- Rugby union
- Federazione Italiana Rugby
- Top12
- Serie A
- Coppa Italia

== Sources ==
- Gianni Colosetti e Nicola Bizzaro (1984). Rugby Razza Piave. Edizioni La Press, Fiesso d'Artico. p. 280.
- Luigino Zecchinel (2009). Storie da Fuorigioco. Mazzanti Editori. p. 260.
