= Andrea Sgorlon =

Italy international rugby union player

Andrea Sgorlon (born 20 January 1968 in San Donà di Piave) is a former Italian rugby union player and a current coach. He played as flanker.

Sgorlon's first team was San Donà, moving afterwards to Benetton Treviso, where he would stay until 2002/03, when he finished his player career. He won 5 Italian Championship titles, in 1996/97, 1997/98, 1998/99, 2000/01 and 2002/02, and the Cup of Italy, in 1996/97, during his time there.

Sgorlon had 37 caps for Italy, from 1993 to 1999, scoring 2 tries, 10 points on aggregate. He was called for the 1995 Rugby World Cup, playing in two games but did not score. The highest point of his international career was at the 1995-1997 FIRA Trophy final, at 22 March 1997, when Italy beat France by 40-32, winning the tournament for the first time.

After finishing his player career, he became a coach. He was in charge of Crociati Rugby Parma (2003-2005), Italy U-18 national team (2005-2007), San Marco Rugby Club (2007-2008), Venezia Mestre Rugby FC (2008-2009), Crociati Rugby Parma (2009-2010), Italy U-17 national team (2011-2012) and of Emerging Italy national team since 2011.
