= Thierry Picard =

France international rugby union player (1956–2025)

- Born: 10 November 1956 Saint-Sauves-d'Auvergne, Puy-de-Dôme, France
- Died: 15 May 2025 (aged 68) Mautes, France
- Height: 6 ft 4 in (193 cm)
- Weight: 236 lb (107 kg)

Rugby union career
- Position: Back-row / Lock
International career
Years	Team	Apps	(Points)
1985–86	France	3	(0)

Thierry Picard (10 November 1956 – 15 May 2025) was a French international rugby union player.

== Life and career ==
Picard was born in Saint-Sauves-d'Auvergne on 10 November 1956. He spent most of his career with AS Montferrand.

A backrower and lock, Picard won three France caps, debuting against the Pumas on the 1985 tour. The following year, Picard played a home international against Romania, then returned to Argentina and gained his third cap. Thierry died from a cardiac arrest on 15 May 2025, at the age of 68.

== See also ==
- List of France national rugby union players
