= Amar Kudin =

Italian rugby union player (1992–2024)

- Born: 9 August 1992 Makarska, Croatia
- Died: 18 November 2024 (aged 32) Rome, Italy
- Height: 1.80 m (5 ft 11 in)
- Weight: 103 kg (16 st 3 lb; 227 lb)

Rugby union career
- Position: Hooker
Youth career
- 2010–2012: Treviso Youth
Senior career
Years	Team	Apps	(Points)
2012–2014	Rugby San Donà	38	(25)
2014–2015	Benetton	6	(0)
2015–2016	Rugby San Donà	16	(15)
2016-2024	Fiamme Oro		
- Correct as of 13 November 2014
International career
Years	Team	Apps	(Points)
2010–2011	Italy U20	2	(5)
- Correct as of 13 November 2014

Amar Kudin (9 August 1992 – 18 November 2024) was a Croatian-born Italian rugby union player and police officer, who played as a hooker. He competed for Fiamme Oro in the Top12.

Born in Croatia, Kudin moved to Italy at a young age, spending most of his time at local rugby youths. Amar spent a couple years with Treviso Youth before joining Rugby San Dona on a professional contract. After a few successful seasons, he returned to his old club after Treviso's clearing out of half the team. In 2014–15 Pro12 season, he played for Benetton.

In 2011, Kudin was named to the Italy Under 20 squad.

== Death ==
In the early morning of 18 November 2024, while on duty as a police officer, Kudin was involved in a collision between two vehicles and died on the scene from his injuries. He was 32.
