= Zimnicea =

- Town
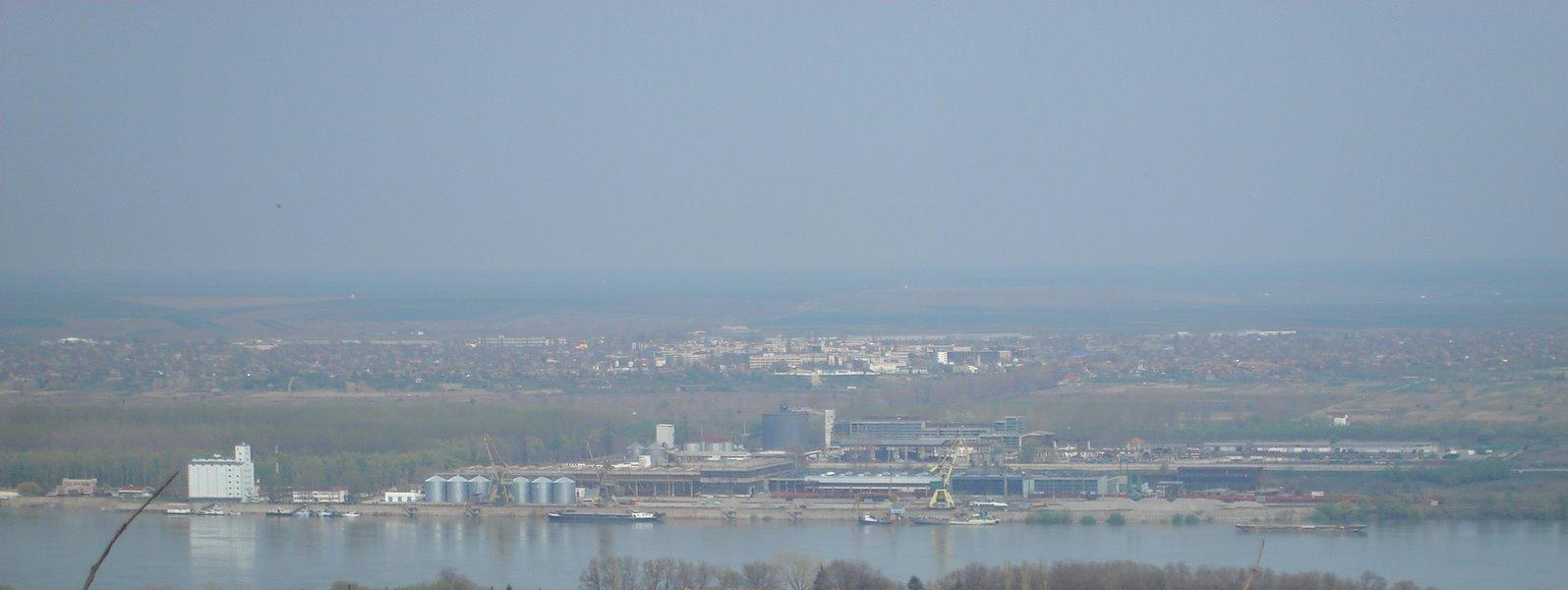
- View of Zimnicea across the Danube

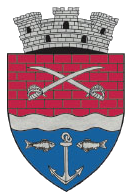
- Coat of arms

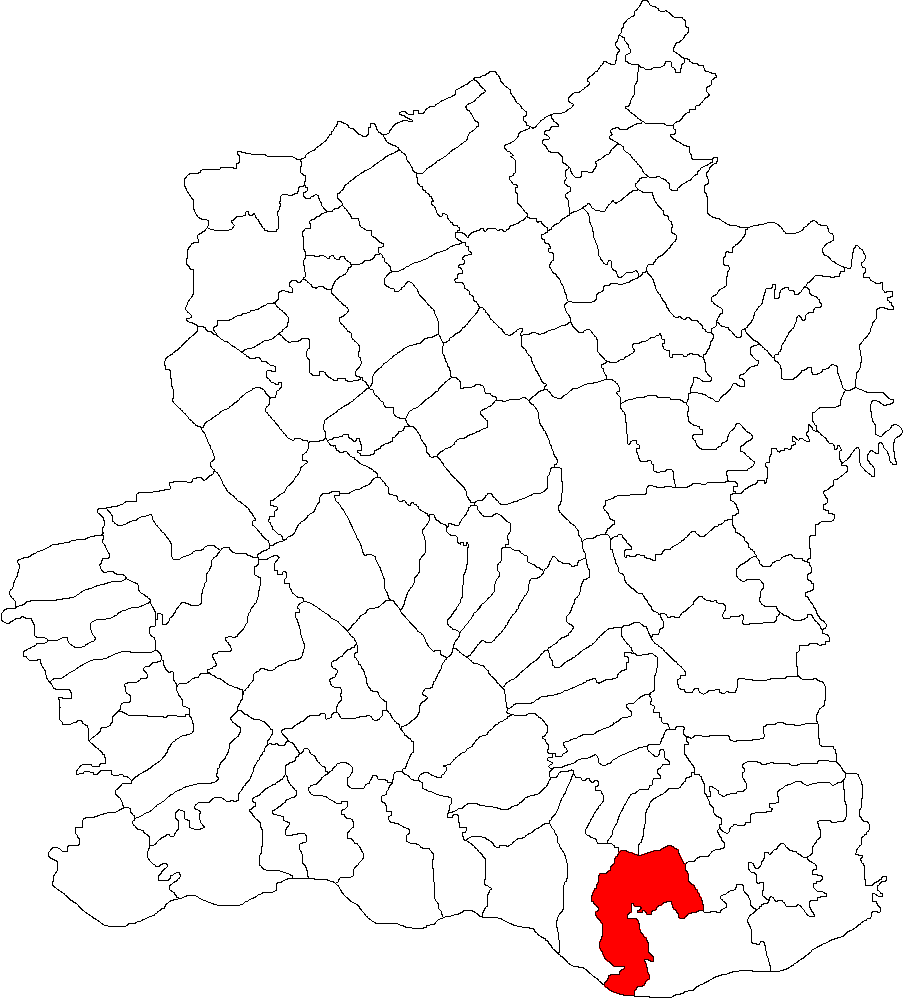
- Location in Teleorman County

- Location in Romania
- Coordinates: 43°39′8″N 25°22′5″E
- Country: Romania
- County: Teleorman

Government
  - Mayor (2024–2028): Petre Pârvu (PSD)
- Area: 131.31 km^{2} (50.70 sq mi)
- Elevation: 48 m (157 ft)
- Population (2021-12-01): 12,589
  - Density: 95.872/km^{2} (248.31/sq mi)
- Time zone: UTC+02:00 (EET)
  - Summer (DST): UTC+03:00 (EEST)
- Postal code: 145400
- Area code: +(40) 247
- Vehicle reg.: TR
- Website: orasulzimnicea.ro

Zimnicea (Romanian pronunciation: [ˈzimnit͡ʃe̯a]) is a town in Teleorman County, Romania (in the historic region of Muntenia), a port on the Danube opposite the Bulgarian city of Svishtov.

== History ==
Zimnicea developed near a Geto-Dacian fortress (about 1,200 metres (3,937 feet) west of town centre). Traditional agriculture, fishing, iron processing, carpentry, pottery, tissue exchange of products were the occupations of the people throughout the town's existence. The natives of Zimnicea sold grain, cattle, sheep, fish, butter, salt, honey, wax, timber and bought cloth, oriental fabric, carpets, and spices.

In 1838, the settlement Zimnicea was passed in the fairs, with the general population census of that year 551 families and 3,046 inhabitants. In the years 1837–1839 Zimnicea became the capital of Teleorman County.

Near Zimnicea there are ruins of several ancient fortresses and fortifications from the 4th to the 1st century BC. The oldest are believed by some scholars to have been built to defend the town from Alexander the Great's general, Lysimachus.

The name of the town was first mentioned in 1385 in the travel logs of Christian pilgrims on their way home from their trip to Jerusalem. The Byzantines called it Demnitzikos and later on Dzimnikes or Dzimnikos. The town flourished as a trade post on the trade routes that linked Central Europe to the Balkans.

In 1835, it had 531 households, being the twelfth largest market town in Wallachia. For a short time in 1837 to 1838, it was the capital of Teleorman County, but due to internal dissent between the landowners and merchants, it was replaced by Alexandria.

During the Romanian War of Independence of 1877–1878, Zimnicea was the headquarters of the Russian Empire troops fighting in Bulgaria against the Ottoman Empire. During World War I, German Empire troops crossed the Danube in the Zimnicea sector, effectively bringing down the Romanian front in Muntenia.

During the 1977 Vrancea earthquake, there were allegedly not many buildings destroyed by the earthquake itself. Most of the destruction is said to have actually been done after the natural disaster by bulldozer, being ordered by local authorities, in order to receive financial allowances from the central government to create a new town from scratch on a new design. In the next period, a new town hall, the House of Culture, a new hospital (with Austrian funding), a new high school (with funds allocated by the Swiss government), and multiple blocks of flats were built, but other projects remained abandoned after the fall of the communist regime, amid declining local industry, and by a subsequent decline in population.

== Geography ==
Zimnicea is situated on the left bank of the Danube river. It is the southernmost place in Romania and a harbour on the Danube river. The distance between the Zimnicea and Bucharest is 122 kilometres (76 miles), and the distance to Alexandria (capital of Teleorman County) is about 39 kilometres (24 mi).

Zimnicea is served around the clock by the Svishtov–Zimnicea ferry – a regularly scheduled Roll-on/roll-off ferry across the Danube between Zimnicea and Svishtov, Bulgaria. The ferry shortens the road path to and from Turkey to Central and Western Europe by 140 kilometres (87 miles) when compared to the traditional route over the Danube Bridge at Ruse-Giurgiu and allows a time gain of nearly four hours thus avoiding the traffic in and around the city of Bucharest.

=== Climate ===
The city's climate is generally temperate continental, featuring hot summers (42°C - July 25, 2023) and freezing winters (-17°C -December 26, 2001). Consequently, temperature contrasts are quite significant between summer and winter, as tropical air masses from the south and southwest converge with dry air masses from the east and southeast in the region. This intersection of air masses explains how, with some risk, even fig trees can be cultivated here. The rainfall gauging station (established in 1963) and the meteorological station provide accurate climatic information that is utilized in numerous specialized publications.

Climate data for Zimnicea (1999-2021)
Month	Jan	Feb	Mar	Apr	May	Jun	Jul	Aug	Sep	Oct	Nov	Dec	Year
Mean daily maximum °C (°F)	5.5 (41.9)	9.1 (48.4)	14.2 (57.6)	19.6 (67.3)	24.0 (75.2)	29.8 (85.6)	32.6 (90.7)	32.9 (91.2)	27.6 (81.7)	19.9 (67.8)	12.0 (53.6)	7.1 (44.8)	19.4 (66.9)
Daily mean °C (°F)	1.2 (34.2)	4.1 (39.4)	8.2 (46.8)	12.8 (55.0)	17.3 (63.1)	22.9 (73.2)	25.3 (77.5)	25.2 (77.4)	20.4 (68.7)	13.5 (56.3)	7.8 (46.0)	3.5 (38.3)	13.5 (56.3)
Mean daily minimum °C (°F)	−3.1 (26.4)	−0.9 (30.4)	2.2 (36.0)	6.0 (42.8)	10.7 (51.3)	16.1 (61.0)	18.0 (64.4)	17.4 (63.3)	13.2 (55.8)	7.1 (44.8)	3.7 (38.7)	−0.1 (31.8)	7.5 (45.5)
Average rainfall mm (inches)	44 (1.7)	36 (1.4)	48 (1.9)	54 (2.1)	66 (2.6)	74 (2.9)	70 (2.8)	44 (1.7)	52 (2.0)	47 (1.9)	44 (1.7)	47 (1.9)	626 (24.6)
Average rainy days	6	5	6	6	8	8	6	4	4	5	5	6	69
Average relative humidity (%)	83	75	68	64	63	62	56	55	61	72	79	82	68
Source: meteomanz.com; climate-data.org

== Demographics ==
Historical population
Year	Pop.	±%
1834	3,000	—
1912	7,563	+152.1%
1930	10,879	+43.8%
1948	11,056	+1.6%
1956	12,445	+12.6%
1966	13,231	+6.3%
1977	13,964	+5.5%
1992	17,128	+22.7%
2002	15,672	−8.5%
2011	14,058	−10.3%
2021	12,589	−10.4%
Source: Census data

At the 2021 census, the town had a population of 12,589; of those, 84.76% were Romanians and 5.83% Roma.

== Natives ==
- Răzvan Grădinaru (born 1995), footballer
- Florea Opriș (born 1956), rugby union football player, referee, and coach
- Miron Radu Paraschivescu (1911–1971), poet, essayist, journalist, and translator

== Politics ==
The mayor of Zimnicea Municipality is Petre Pârvu, he is in his second mandate and is chosen from the list of the coalition For Zimnicea that includes PNL, PD-L, PC, and PSD.

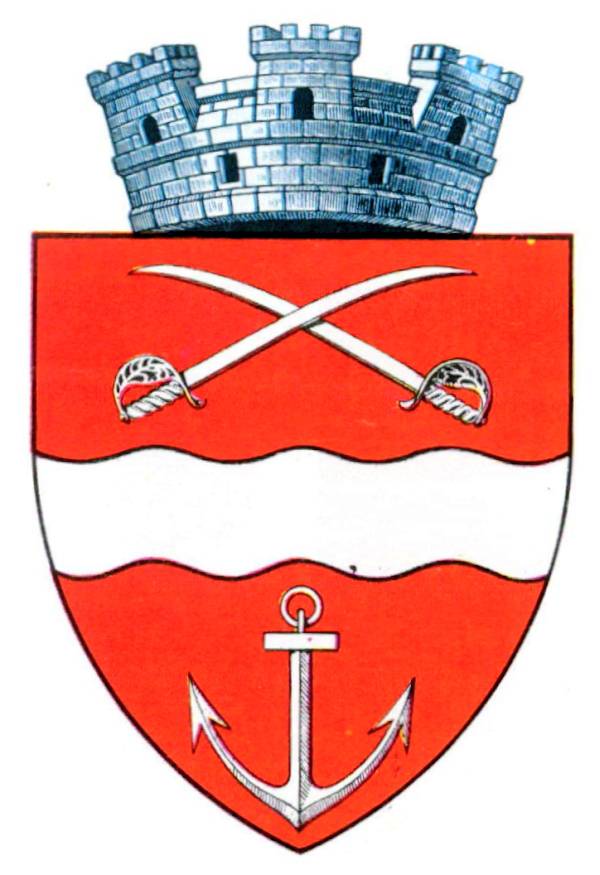
Interbelic coat of arms

== Economy ==
During the communist era, Zimnicea underwent forced industrialization, and the new industries suffered a strong decline after the fall of the communist regime.

== Education and culture ==
In Zimnicea there are 5 kindergartens, 4 elementary schools with primary and secondary education and one high school. The high school has 15 classrooms, a gym and a school workshop. Classes are attended by 511 students, with two shifts and evening school hours. Zimnicea High School has a library with 20,578 volumes and a science laboratory equipped with 30 computers.

School No.1, Miron Radu Paraschivescu has 15 classrooms, including 3 laboratories (physics, chemistry, biology), 5 cabinets teachers (mathematics, geography, design, religion, Romanian), a gym, a workshop school and a library.

The three elementary schools are: Miron Radu Paraschivescu Primary and Secondary School, school numbers 2 and 3.

== Culture ==
Zimnicea does not have any artistic events held occasionally or permanently. The budget allocated for cultural activities is insufficient for a cultural life. Cultural institutions operating in Zimnicea are: the cultural centre and the town library.

The city library was founded in 1952 and after December 1989 received the name of a local poet, Miron Radu Paraschivescu.

== Tourism ==
The "Dunărica" children camp has a capacity of 200 accommodation places, with a football field and a tennis court, a kayak-canoe base and a cafeteria with 250 places.

"Zimtub SA" Zimnicea Hotel has a capacity of 48 rooms, a restaurant with 100 seats and a nightclub with 80 seats.

The amusement and recreation base "Disko - Hope" is situated on the Danube riverside and has a beach with, as well as an outdoor dancing club with a capacity of 1,200 places; There is also an amusement base at the beach from Cheson.

== International relations ==
=== Twin towns – Sister cities ===
Zimnicea is twinned with:

Svishtov, Bulgaria (since 2001); Nikopol, Bulgaria (since 2001); Belene, Bulgaria (since 2001)	Pieve Emanuele, Italy (since 2003); Bouaké, Ivory Coast (since 2004); Nikopol, Ukraine (since 2004)
