= João Queimado =

Portuguese rugby union player

João Ferreira Queimado (born 1962) is a former Portuguese rugby union player. He played as a centre and as a fly-half and is the son of former Benfica president José Ferreira Queimado.

== Career ==
Queimado spent his entire career at Benfica, started at 14 years old, in 1978/79. He was promoted to the first category in 1982/83 and would play until 1996/97. He won 3 National Championships, in 1985/86, 1987/88 and 1990/91, 3 Cups of Portugal, in 1982/83, 1983/84 and 1984/85, and 2 Iberian Cups. He is the top scorer of Benfica's history, with more than 3200 points on official games.

He had 48 caps for Portugal, from 1984 to 1994, scoring 1 try, 10 conversions, 21 penalties and 4 drop goals, 100 points in aggregate. His first game was a 6-6 draw with Spain on 11 March 1984, in Madrid, for the FIRA Championship D2, Pool A, and his last game was a 35-19 loss to Spain, on 28 May 1994, in Madrid, for the 1995 Rugby World Cup qualifyings.

He was selected twice to play for the FIRA team.

He took charge of the rugby section of Benfica in November 2003.
