= David O'Mahony =

Irish rugby union player

- Born: 18 August 1970 (age 56) Derry, Northern Ireland
- Height: 1.75 m (5 ft 9 in)
- Weight: 86 kg (13.5 st; 190 lb)
- School: Christian Brothers College

Rugby union career
- Position: Scrum-half
Amateur team(s)
Years	Team	Apps	(Points)
- UCC
–	Cork Constitution		
–	Lansdowne		
Senior career
Years	Team	Apps	(Points)
1995–1996	Munster	4	(0)
1997–1998	Leinster	7	(10)
International career
Years	Team	Apps	(Points)
1995	Ireland	1	(0)

David O'Mahony (born 18 August 1970) is an Irish former rugby union player and coach.

== Career ==
Though he was born in Derry, Northern Ireland, O'Mahony was educated at Christian Brothers College, Cork and represented the schools seniors in the Munster Schools Rugby Senior Cup, before going on to join UCC and Cork Constitution. Strong performances in the All-Ireland League earned O'Mahony selection for Munster, where he was in competition for the starting scrum-half jersey with the experienced Michael Bradley. He won his only Ireland cap against Italy in May 1995, after both Bradley and Niall Hogan were unavailable. However, injury and the return of Bradley and Hogan meant O'Mahony was not considered for international honours again. He moved to Dublin and joined Lansdowne and Leinster but, when rugby union became openly professional in 1995, O'Mahony had to choose between a 12-month professional contract or his better-paid banking job, and ultimately chose the latter.

O'Mahony remained involved with rugby through his coaching capacity, working with the Ireland Clubs team, who are represented by players from the amateur All-Ireland League, and Cork clubs Dolphin and Clonakilty.
