= Barinov =

Barinov (masculine, Russian: Баринов) or Barinova (feminine, Russian: Баринова) is a Russian surname. Notable people with the surname include:

- Alexey Barinov (born 1951), Russian businessman and politician
- Dmitri Barinov (born 1996), Russian footballer
- Yuri Barinov (born 1955), Russian Soviet cyclist
