= Yepifanov =

Yepifanov (masculine, Russian: Епифанов) or Yepifanova (feminine, Russian: Епифанова), also transliterated as Epifanov(a), is a Russian patronymic surname meaning "son of Yepifan". Notable people with the surname include:

- Aleksei Yepifanov (born 1983), Russian footballer
- Alla Yepifanova (born 1976), Russian cyclist
- Dmitri Yepifanov (born 1978), Russian footballer
- Nikolay Yepifanov (born 1926), Soviet sailor
- Olga Yepifanova (born 1966), Russian politician
