= Salvador Torres (rugby union) =

Spain international rugby union player (b. 1956)

- Born: Salvador Torres Ortega; August 22, 1956 (age 70) Ulea, Murcia, Spain
- Height: 1.73 cm (1 in)
- Weight: 72 kg (159 lb)

Rugby union career
- Position(s): Wing, Centre
Senior career
Years	Team	Apps	(Points)
1976–1990	UE Santboiana		
International career
Years	Team	Apps	(Points)
1976–1990	Spain	60	(0)

Salvador Torres Ortega (born in Ulea, on 22 August 1956) is a Spanish former rugby union player, who had 60 caps for Spain between 1976 and 1990. He played as centre and as wing.

== Career ==
Torres left his home village at age 5, and at age 11 he started practicing rugby. He played for his entire career for UE Santboiana, winning as captain the club's league titles in 1983–84, 1986–87 and 1988–89 alongside the Copa del Rey title in 1988–89, among other titles. He was one of the first members of the national rugby sevens team which started competing in the late 1980s. In the senior national team, Torres played 60 matches, much more than anyone else by then, beating Manolo Moriche's record of 59 caps. Torres debuted for Spain during the test match against Scotland XV at Murrayfield, on 19 April 1987, with his final cap being during the test against Scotland A in Seville on 22 December 1990.

In 1995, he became the assistant coach for Spain, back then coached by Bryce Bevin.
