= Yuri Vasiliev =

Russian basketball player

Yuri Vasiliev (Russian: Юрий Васильев) is a Russian professional basketball player. He is 2.07 m (6 ft 9 in) tall and weighs 104 kg (229 lb). He currently plays with the pro club Dynamo Moscow. Vasiliev has also been a member of the Russia men's national basketball team.
