= Saint-Sauves-d'Auvergne =

- Commune
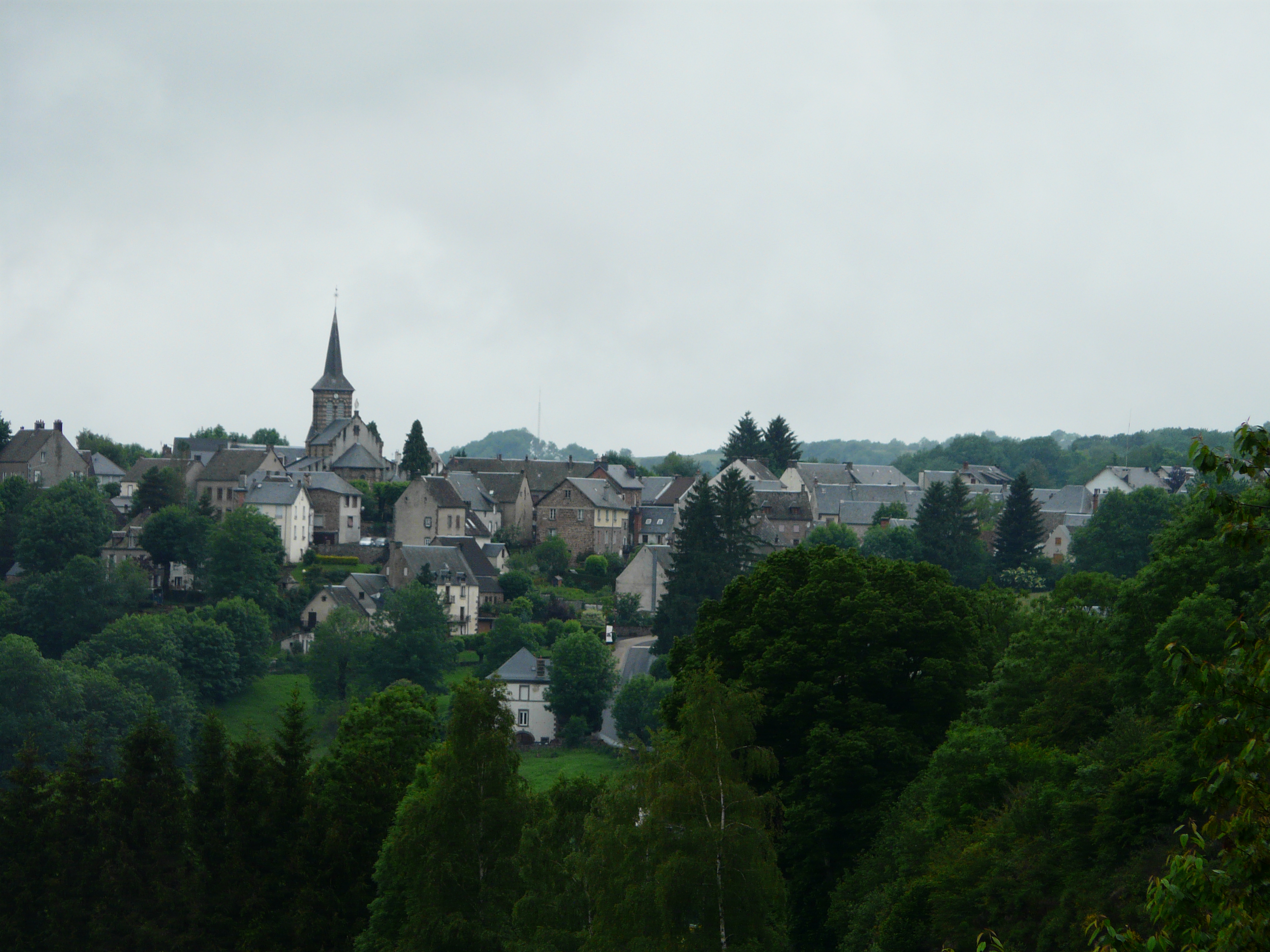
- A general view of Saint-Sauves-d'Auvergne

- Coat of arms
- Location of Saint-Sauves-d'Auvergne
- Location within France Location within Auvergne-Rhône-Alpes
- Coordinates: 45°36′25″N 2°41′17″E
- Country: France
- Region: Auvergne-Rhône-Alpes
- Department: Puy-de-Dôme
- Arrondissement: Issoire
- Canton: Le Sancy
- Intercommunality: Dômes Sancy Artense

Government
  - Mayor (2020–2026): David Sauvat
- Area^{1}: 49.86 km^{2} (19.25 sq mi)
- Elevation: 844 m (2,769 ft)
- Highest elevation: 1,328 m (4,357 ft)
- Lowest elevation: 710 m (2,330 ft)
- Population (2023): 1,127
  - Density: 22.60/km^{2} (58.54/sq mi)
- Time zone: UTC+01:00 (CET)
  - Summer (DST): UTC+02:00 (CEST)
- INSEE/Postal code: 63397 /63950
- ^{1} French Land Register data, which excludes lakes, ponds, glaciers > 1 km^{2} (0.386 sq mi or 247 acres) and river estuaries.

Saint-Sauves-d'Auvergne (French pronunciation: [sɛ̃ sov dovɛʁɲ]) is a commune in the Puy-de-Dôme department in Auvergne in central France.

== See also ==
- Communes of the Puy-de-Dôme department
