= Javier Pértile =

Javier Pértile (born General San Martín, 26 October 1968) is a former Argentine-Italian rugby union player. He played as a fullback.

He first played in Argentina, but moved to Italy to play for Rugby Roma Olimpic, from 1994/95 to 1998/99. He won the Coppa Italia in 1998/99. He returned to his home country, where he played for Clube de Regatas de Resistencia, from 2000 to 2008, where he left competition aged 40 years old.

He was from Italian ancestry and decided to represent Italy. He had 15 caps from 1994 to 1999, scoring 1 try, 5 points on aggregate. He played at the 1995-1997 FIRA Trophy, won by Italy for the first time.
