= José Tormo =

Spain international rugby union player

- Full name: José Tormo López
- Born: 13 January 1959 (age 67) Valencia, Spain
- Height: 182 cm (6 ft 0 in)
- Weight: 83 kg (183 lb)

Rugby union career
- Position(s): Lock, Wing
Senior career
Years	Team	Apps	(Points)
1975-1988	RC Valencia		
International career
Years	Team	Apps	(Points)
1980-1987	Spain	26	(0)

José Tormo López (born 13 January 1959), known also by his nickname Pepo Tormo, is a Spanish former rugby union player who played as lock and wing.

== Career ==
Tormo played for RC Valencia's first grade team since the age of 16, becoming one of the players who had more than 300 caps for the club and captained RC Valencia which took part at the 1979 and 1986 editions of Copa del Rey de Rugby.

He was first capped for Spain on 28 April 1980 against Netherlands in Barcelona. His last cap was during the test against Scotland XV at Murrayfield, on 19 April 1987.

In 1988, Tormo was awarded with a bronze medal by the FER due to him earned more than 25 international caps.

== Personal life ==
His brothers Javi and Carlos were also rugby union players. The former was a Spain international who played as scrum-half.
