= Andrea Castellani =

Italian rugby union player

Andrea Castellani (born 15 May 1972 in L'Aquila) is a former Italian rugby union player and a current coach. He played as a prop.

Castellani played for L'Aquila Rugby (1993/94–1995/96), where he won the Italian Championship in 1993/94, Benetton Treviso (1996/97), winning once more the Italian Championship, L'Aquila Rugby (1997/98) and Rugby Roma Olimpic (1998/99–2002/03), winning his third national title for a different team in 1999/2000.

Castellani had 20 caps for Italy, from 1994 to 1999, scoring 1 try, 5 points in aggregate. He was called for the 1995 Rugby World Cup, never leaving the bench, and for the 1999 Rugby World Cup, where he played two games.

After retiring from playing, he became assistant coach for Unione Rugby Capitolina, from 2003/04 to 2007/08.
