= Cornel Popescu =

Romanian bobsledder

Personal information
- Nationality: Romanian
- Born: 8 June 1960 (age 64); Urzica, Romania, Romania

Sport
- Sport: Bobsleigh

Cornel Popescu (born 8 June 1960) is a Romanian bobsledder and international rugby union player. He competed in the two man and the four man events at the 1984 Winter Olympics.
