= Enrico Francescato =

Italian rugby union player

- Born: 19 July 1993 (age 33) Treviso, Italy
- Height: 1.73 m (5 ft 8 in)
- Weight: 80 kg (12 st 8 lb; 176 lb)
- Notable relative(s): Bruno Francescato (father), Ivan Francescato (uncle), Nello Francescato (uncle), Rino Francescato (uncle)

Rugby union career
- Position: Scrum-Half
- Current team: San Donà
Youth career
- Ruggers Tarvisium
Senior career
Years	Team	Apps	(Points)
2012−2019	Petrarca Padova	92	(40)
2017	→Benetton	2	(0)
2019−	San Donà		
- Correct as of 1 June 2020
International career
Years	Team	Apps	(Points)
2016−2017	Italy Sevens	30	(15)
- Correct as of 3 June 2020

Enrico Francescato (Treviso 19 July 1993) is an Italian rugby union player. His usual position is as a Scrum-half, and he currently plays for San Donà.

For 2016–17 Pro12 season, he was an Additional Player for Benetton.

From 2016 to 2017, Francescato was also named in the Italy Sevens squad for the annual Sevens Grand Prix Series.
