= Fabio Gaetaniello =

Italy international rugby union player

- Born: 23 August 1958 (age 68)
- Height: 6 ft 0 in (1.83 m)
- Weight: 185 lb (84 kg)

Rugby union career
- Position: Centre
Senior career
Years	Team	Apps	(Points)
1978-1982	Rugby Livorno 1931		
1982-1988	Rugby Parma F.C. 1931		
International career
Years	Team	Apps	(Points)
1980-1991	Italy	30	(20)
Coaching career
- Years: Team
- 1994-2004: Livorno
- 2004-2006: Italy 7s
- 2006-2011: Cavalieri Prato

Fabio Gaetaniello (born 25 August 1958 in Livorno) is a former Italian rugby union player and coach. He played as a centre.

== Club career ==
He started his career at CUS Pisa, like his brother Fabrizio, who also would be an international player, where he played until 1977/78. He moved afterwards to Rugby Livorno 1931, being at their squad from 1978/79 to 1981/82. He had his debut at Italian Championship in 1978. He moved to Rugby Parma F.C. 1931, where he played from 1982/83 to 1987/88. Once again, he returned to Rugby Livorno 1931, his team from 1988/89 to 1993/94, where he finished his player career. Gaetaniello never won an important national title during his player days.

== National Team Career ==
He had 30 caps for Italy, from 1980 to 1991, scoring 5 tries, 20 points on aggregate. His first game was at the 18-13 win over Spain, in Madrid, at 21 December 1980, for the 1980–81 FIRA Trophy, aged 22 years old. He was called for the 1987 Rugby World Cup, playing in three games, without scoring, and for the 1991 Rugby World Cup, playing in three games and scoring a try in the 30-9 win over the United States, in Otley, at 5 October 1991. That would be the second win and the best result to date of Italy at the competition. His last game came at the 21-31 loss to New Zealand, in Leicester, at 13 October 1991, aged 33 years old, as Italy exited competition at the 1st round.

== Coaching career ==
Gaetaniello become a coach, after ending his player career, being in charge of Rugby Livorno 1931, from 1994/95 to 2003/04. He was the coach of Italy Sevens national team for two seasons, from 2004/05 to 2005/06. He was in charge of Cavalieri Prato, with Andrea De Rossi, from 2006/07 to 2010/11, achieving the promotion to the Super 10 in 2008/09, and being runners-up of the Italian Championship in 2010/11.
