= Guido Rossi (rugby union) =

Italian former rugby union player (born 1959)

- Born: 18 April 1959 (age 67) Treviso, Italy
- Height: 185 cm (6 ft 1 in)
- Weight: 110 kg (243 lb)

Rugby union career
- Position: Prop
Senior career
Years	Team	Apps	(Points)
1977–1994	Benetton Rugby	410	((?))
International career
Years	Team	Apps	(Points)
1981–1991	Italy	45	(0)

Guido Rossi (born 18 April 1959) is a former Italian rugby union player. He played as a prop.

== Club career ==
Born in Treviso, Rossi played all his career at the city's Benetton Rugby from 1977–78 to 1993–94. He was one of the most emblematic players of Benetton Treviso during this time, winning four titles of the National Championship of Excellence in 1977–78, 1982–83, 1988–89, and 1991–92.

== International career ==
Rossi had 45 caps for the Italy national rugby union team from 1981 to 1991 without ever scoring. He played in all the editions of the European Nations Cup during this time. He was called for the 1987 Rugby World Cup, where he played two games. He was also called for the 1991 Rugby World Cup, wehere he did not play any game.
