= Florea Opriș =

- Born: Florea Opriș; 10 March 1956 (age 70) Zimnicea, Teleorman County Romania
- Occupation: coach

Rugby union career
- Position: Prop
Youth career
- 1974-1980: Dunărea Giurgiu
Senior career
Years	Team	Apps	(Points)
1980-1990	Farul Constanța		
1990-1991	Entente Sportive Avignon Saint-Saturnin		
1993-1994	Farul Constanța		
International career
Years	Team	Apps	(Points)
1986–1987	Romania	7	(0)
Coaching career
- Years: Team
- 1995: Centrul de Copii Farul
- 2000: C.S. Ovidiu
- 2005: R.C.J. Farul

Florea Opriș (born 10 March 1956) in Zimnicea, is a former Romanian rugby union football player, referee and currently coach. He played as prop, as well as flanker.

== Career ==
He mostly played for Farul Constanța, except in the 1990–91 season, where he moved in France, playing for Entente Sportive Avignon Saint-Saturnin.

== International career ==
Opriș debuted for Romania against France, in Lille, on 12 April 1986. He was also part of the 1987 Rugby World Cup squad where he played only his last international match, which was also against France, in Wellington, New Zealand, on 28 May 1987.

== Honours ==
Farul Constanța

- Cupa României: 1986-87
