= Aarstad =

Aarstad is a Norwegian surname. Notable people with the surname include:

- Hans Aarstad (1878–1954), Norwegian politician
- Stian Aarstad (fl. 1993–2005), Norwegian musician
- Wilhelm Aarstad (1854–1933), Norwegian politician
