= Marco Platania =

Italian rugby union player

Marco Platania (born 6 May 1973, in Cremona) is a former Italian rugby union player. He played as a centre.

Platania played for Amatori Rugby Milano, from 1991/92 to 1997/98, winning 3 titles of the Italian Championship, in 1992/93, 1994/95 and 1996/97, and the Cup of Italy in 1994/95. He moved to Amatori & Calvisano, where he stayed from 1998/99 to 2000/01. He left sports aged only 28 years to pursue a professional career as an engineer, having graduated shortly before.

Platania had 4 caps for Italy, from 1994 to 1996, scoring 2 tries, 10 points on aggregate. He was called for the 1995 Rugby World Cup but he never played. He also played for Italy A.
