= Pierre Bondouy =

French rugby union player (born 1970)

- Born: 30 July 1970 (age 56) Villefranche-de-Lauragais, Haute-Garonne, France
- Height: 5 ft 11 in (180 cm)
- Weight: 166 lb (75 kg)

Rugby union career
- Position: Three-quarter
International career
Years	Team	Apps	(Points)
1997–2000	France	5	(10)

Pierre Bondouy (born 30 July 1970) is a French former rugby union international.

Born in Villefranche-de-Lauragais, Bondouy was a three-quarter, capped five times by France between 1997 and 2000. He made his debut off the bench in a win over Scotland at Parc des Princes in the 1997 Five Nations, which earned France the grand slam. His two Test tries both came as a centre in France's 1997 loss to Italy in Grenoble. Later that year, Bondouy gained place on the tour of Australia, where he played the 2nd Test against the Wallabies at Ballymore.

Bondouy was a member of Stade Toulousain's 1998–99 French Championship-winning team and scored 12 tries for the club in Heineken Cup competition. He finished his career with several seasons at US Montauban.

== See also ==
- List of France national rugby union players
