= Serafino Ghizzoni =

Italy international rugby union player

- Born: Serafino Ghizzoni; 16 October 1954 (age 72) L'Aquila, Italy
- Occupation: Car rental

Rugby union career
- Position(s): Wing, full-back
Amateur team(s)
Years	Team	Apps	(Points)
1970-1972	L'Aquila		
Senior career
Years	Team	Apps	(Points)
1972-1996	L'Aquila	371	(686)
International career
Years	Team	Apps	(Points)
1977-1987	Italy	60	(77)

Serafino Ghizzoni (born 16 October 1954 in L'Aquila, Italy) is a former Italian international rugby union footballer, who played the 1st Rugby World Cup in 1987.

== Biography ==
Born and raised in L'Aquila, Ghizzoni started playing rugby at L'Aquila Rugby as wing. He debuted as senior in 1972 and won the Italy's Cup in 1973.

He won his first cap for Italy on 6 February 1977 in the FIRA Championship against France A1; he won his first full international one month later in Casablanca vs. Morocco.

Three years later, he won two Italian championships in a row with L'Aquila Rugby.

Ghizzoni was part of the team that played the 1st World Cup in Australia and New Zealand; he won his last cap against the All Blacks.

In the last years of his career, he moved to full-back. In 1994, he won his last domestic title with L'Aquila as underdog, beating the highly rated Milan Rugby (which was at the time owned by Silvio Berlusconi) in the championship final in Padua.

Since his retirement, he has been running his family business (car and bus rental) and working as a ski instructor and amateur mountain rally driver.
