= Fulvio Lorigiola =

Italian rugby union player

Fulvio Lorigiola (born 6 January 1959 in Padua) is a former Italian rugby union player, a current sports executive and a lawyer. He played as a scrum-half.

Lorigiola played his full career at Petrarca Rugby, from 1977/78 to 1992/93. He won five titles of the National Championship of Excellence, during the golden years of Petrarca, in 1979/80, 1983/84, 1984/85, 1985/86 and 1986/87. He also won the Cup of Italy in 1981/82.

He had 34 caps for Italy, from 1979 to 1988, scoring 2 tries, 8 points on aggregate. He was called for the 1987 Rugby World Cup, playing in two games but remaining scoreless.

After finishing his player career, he became an adviser to the Italian Rugby Federation, of which he was vice-president from 1996 to 1998, during Giancarlo Dondi's presidency. He was President of Petrarca Rugby from 2003 to 2009.
