= Gianni Zanon =

Italy international rugby union player

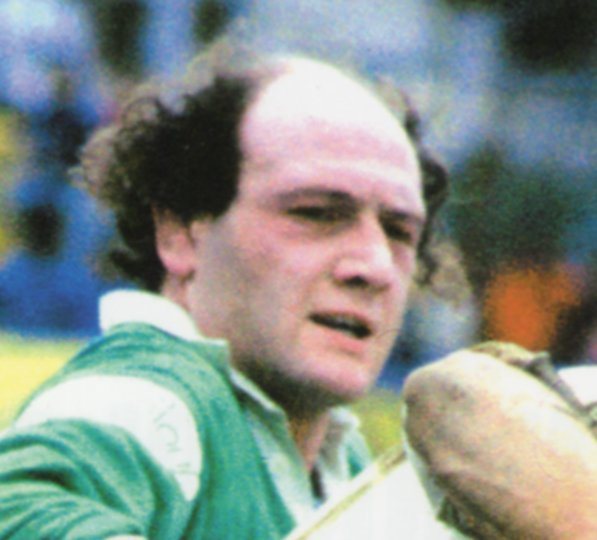
- Zanon in a championship match against Petrarca, 1987
- Born: 3 March 1960 (age 66) Treviso, Italy

Rugby union career
- Position: Lock
Senior career
Years	Team	Apps	(Points)
1980-1993	Benetton Treviso		
International career
Years	Team	Apps	(Points)
1981-1988	Italy	45	(36)
Coaching career
- Years: Team
- 1993-1997: Benetton Treviso
- 1997-1999: Udine Rugby
- 2015-2010: Benetton Treviso(under-20)

Gianni Zanon (born 3 March 1960 in Treviso) is a former Italian rugby union player and a current coach. He played as a flanker.

Zanon started his career at Tarvisium, where he played until 1979/80. He moved then to Benetton Treviso, where he stayed from 1980/81 to 1992/93. He won three Italian Championship titles, in 1982/83, 1988/89 and 1991/92.

He had 45 caps for Italy, from 1981 to 1991, scoring 9 tries, 36 points on aggregate. He was called for the 1987 Rugby World Cup, playing in a single game, and for the 1991 Rugby World Cup, where he was the captain, playing in two games. He never scored in either occasions.

After finishing his player career, he became a coach. He was one of the two head coaches of Benetton Rugby Treviso, with Oscar Collodo, from 1993/94 to 1996/97, winning the National Championship in 1996/97. He was the coach of Udine Rugby, from 1997/98 to 1998/99. He returned to Benetton Rugby in 2005/06, being in charge of the second team and of the U-16 and U-20 categories, until 2009/10. In 2010, he was nominated technical coordinator of the youth categories.
