= Aratz Gallastegui =

Spain international rugby union player

- Born: 4 September 1976 (age 50) Berango, Basque Country, Spain
- Height: 5 ft 8 in (1.73 m)
- Weight: 160 lb (73 kg)

Rugby union career
- Position: Scrum-half
Senior career
Years	Team	Apps	(Points)
1986-2001	Getxo Artea RT		
2001-2004	Saint-Jean-de-Luz		
2004-2006	Gernika RT		
2006-2007	Getxo Artea RT		
International career
Years	Team	Apps	(Points)
1997-1999	Spain	7	(0)

Aratz Gallastegui Sodupe (born 4 September 1976 in Berango) is a basque former rugby union player. He played as a scrum-half. In his home region, the Basque Country, his name is often spelled as Aratz Gallastegi.

== Career ==
He debuted for the Spain national rugby union team in a test match against Andorra on 8 November 1997. Gallastegui also played two matches of the 1999 Rugby World Cup for Spain against South Africa and Scotland, the latter being his last international cap for Spain. At club level, he mainly played for Getxo Artea RT. After retiring as player, Gallastegui became coach of Durango RT in 2008. From 2014 he is the backs coach of Ordizia Rugby Elkartea.
