= Ștefan Tofan =

Romanian rugby union football player (born 1965)

- Born: Ștefan Ioan Tofan; 25 February 1965 (age 61) Huși, Romania
- Height: 178 cm (5 ft 10 in)
- Weight: 76 kg (168 lb)

Rugby union career
- Position: Centre
Senior career
Years	Team	Apps	(Points)
1981-1994	Dinamo București		
International career
Years	Team	Apps	(Points)
1985–1994	Romania	20	(4)

Ștefan Ioan Tofan (born 25 February 1965 in Huși) is a former Romanian rugby union football player. He played as a centre.

== Club career ==
Tofan played for Dinamo București during his career.

== International career ==
Tofan gathered 20 caps for Romania, from his debut in 1985 to his last game in 1994. He scored 2 conversions during his international career, 4 points on aggregate. He was a member of his national side for the 1st and 2nd Rugby World Cups in 1987 and 1991 and played in 3 group matches in 1987.

== Honours ==
Dinamo București

- Divizia Națională: 1990-91, 1993–94
