= Tomás Pardo =

Spain international rugby union player

- Full name: Tomás Pardo Vidal
- Born: November 14, 1957 (age 68) Alzira, Spain

Rugby union career
- Position(s): Lock, Prop
Senior career
Years	Team	Apps	(Points)
1974-1978	RC Vichy		
1978-1980	Saint-Jean-de-Luz Olympique		
1980-1985	RC Valencia		
1985-1992	Rugby Club Alzira		
International career
Years	Team	Apps	(Points)
1976-1988	Spain	38	(0)

Tomás Pardo Vidal (born 14 September 1957) is a Spanish former rugby union player who had 38 international caps for Spain, between 1976 and 1988. He played as lock and prop.

== Career ==
Pardo started his sports career in 1970, in the lower grades of RC Vichy, debuting for the first-grade team in 1974.In 1978, he moved to Saint-Jean-de-Luz Olympique, which competed in the French top categories. In 1980, Pardo returned in Spain to play for Rugby Club Valencia, with which he won the 1982–83 season title and was runner up at the 1985-86 Copa del Rey. In 1983, he also co-founded Rugby Club Alzira, the club of his hometown, for which he played in 1985 until his retirement as player in 1992, later starting a career as coach, which included a participation at the 1999 Rugby World Cup, where he was the assistant coach for Spain's head coach Alfonso Feijoo.

In 1984, he also played for the South American Jaguars during their tour to South Africa.

== Personal life ==
Outside the field, Pardo worked as a firefighter. His sons, Lionel Pardo and Yannick Pardo are professional rugby union players.
