= Stefano Bettarello =

Italian former rugby union player

Stefano Bettarello (born 2 April 1958 in Rovigo) is an Italian former rugby union player. He played as a fly-half for several clubs, mainly Rovigo and Benetton Treviso, winning an Italian Championship with each.

Son of Romano Bettarello and nephew of Ottorino Bettarello, both international players for Italy, he was considered amongst of the best Italian players of his generation. He won 55 full caps for Italy, from 1979 to 1988, scoring 7 tries, 46 conversions, 104 penalties and 17 drop goals totalising 483 points, that made him the second best international scorer for his country after Diego Dominguez. He played in the FIRA Championships and Mediterranean Cups.

In 1987 he was the first Italian ever to be invited by the Barbarians.
