= Manolo Moriche =

Spain international rugby union player and commentator (b. 1950)

- Born: Manuel Moriche Mostajo; 6 August 1950 (age 76) Zaragoza, Aragon, Spain
- Occupation: Sports commentator

Rugby union career
- Position: Fly-half
Senior career
Years	Team	Apps	(Points)
1968–1973	CR El Salvador		
1974–1978	CD Arquitectura		
1974	Veterinaria Zaragoza		
1978–1980	Futbol Club Barcelona		
1980–1983	CD Arquitectura		
International career
Years	Team	Apps	(Points)
1970–1983	Spain	59	(33)

Manuel Moriche Mostajo (born in Zaragoza, 6 August 1950), is a Spanish former rugby union player and currently, commentator.

He had 59 caps for the Spain national team between 1970 and 1983. He played as fly-half and was considered the best Spanish rugby union player of the 1970s.

== Career ==
He grew up in Valladolid and was educated at Colegio El Salvador by the French priest George Bernès, who introduced rugby in the city in the 1960s. With the El Salvador club he played three seasons Liga Nacional achieving ending runner-up twice and earning a third place.Due to the college direction board not renovating his sports license, Moriche moved to Madrid to play for Club Deportivo Arquitectura, with which he won 5 league titles and two Copa del Rey titles. In 1974 he played temporarily for Veterinaria Zaragoza in the second division, due to his conscription. In 1978 he left Madrid to play two seasons for Futbol Club Barcelona, returning to Arquitectura in 1980. He was the brains of the best team of the national panorama and of the national team during these years, and at the time of his retirement, he was the most capped Spanish player of the history.

Currently, Manolo Moriche is most known for his journalistic work he practices since the 1990s commentating rugby union matches for Canal+ and Movistar+.
