= 1985 Australia rugby union tour of New Zealand =

- Coach: Alan Jones
- Tour captain: Steve Williams
- Top point scorer: Michael Lynagh (5 points)
- Top try scorer: James Black (1 try)
- Top test point scorer: Michael Lynagh (5 points)
- Top test try scorer: James Black (1 try)
Summary
P	W	D	L
Total
1	0	0	1
Test match
1	0	0	1
Opponent
P	W	D	L
New Zealand
1	0	0	1

Tour chronology
- ← 1984 Great Britain and Ireland 1986 New Zealand →

The 1985 Australia tour of New Zealand was Australia's sixteenth, and fourth one-test, tour of New Zealand. Played in late June 1985, the tour of New Zealand was one that followed Australia's tour of Great Britain and Ireland just 255 days earlier. Australia hadn't toured New Zealand since 1982, where New Zealand won the three-test series 2–1.

The match was played at Eden Park, Auckland. Mirroring the two teams' previous encounter, the result finished in New Zealand's favour by one-point. As of 2023 (40 years, 114 days) the final score is the closest result by margin at Eden Park between Australia and New Zealand.

== Match details ==
29 June 1985
NZST (UTC+12) 14:30

New Zealand	10–9	Australia
Try: Green; Con: Crowley (0/1); Pen: Crowley (2)	Report	Try: Black; Con: Lynagh (1/1); Pen: Lynagh (1)

Eden Park, Auckland
Attendance: 46,000
Referee: David Burnett (Ireland)

FB	15	Kieran Crowley
RW	14	John Kirwan
OC	13	Steve Pokere
IC	12	Warwick Taylor
LW	11	Craig Green
FH	10	Wayne Smith
SH	9	David Kirk
N8	8	Murray Mexted
OF	7	Jock Hobbs
BF	6	Mark Shaw
RL	5	Gary Whetton
LL	4	Murray Pierce
TP	3	Gary Knight
HK	2	Andy Dalton (c)
LP	1	John Ashworth
Coach:
Brian Lochore

FB	15	Roger Gould
RW	14	Peter Grigg
OC	13	James Black
IC	12	Tim Lane
LW	11	Matthew Burke
FH	10	Michael Lynagh
SH	9	Nick Farr-Jones
N8	8	Steve Tuynman
OF	7	Simon Poidevin
BF	6	David Codey
RL	5	Steve Williams (c)
LL	4	Steve Cutler
TP	3	Andy McIntyre
HK	2	Tom Lawton
LP	1	Topo Rodriguez
Coach:
Alan Jones
