= 1984 Australia rugby union tour of Fiji =

Summary
P	W	D	L
Total
3	3	0	0
Test match
1	1	0	0
Opponent
P	W	D	L
Fiji
1	1	0	0

The 1984 Australia rugby union tour of Fiji was a series of 3 matches played in May 1984 by Australia in Fiji.

== Results ==
2 June 1984

Eastern XV	4–19	Australia XV

National Stadium, Suva

5 June 1984

Western XV	4–15	Australia XV

Lautoka

9 June 1984

Fiji	3–16	Australia

National Stadium, Suva

== Touring party ==
- Manager: Chilla Wilson
- Assistant Manager/Coach: Alan Jones
- Hon. Doctor: Sr. S. Sugarman
- Captain: Andrew Slack (QLD)
- James Black (NSW)
- Matt Burke (NSW)
- Bill Calcraft (NSW)
- Bill Campbell (QLD)
- David Campese (ACT)
- Philip Cox (NSW)
- Mark Ella (NSW)
- Nick Farr-Jones (NSW)
- Peter FitzSimons (NSW)
- Peter Grigg (QLD)
- Ross Hanley (QLD)
- Nigel Holt (QLD)
- Tim Lane (QLD)
- Tom Lawton (QLD)
- Cameron Lillicrap (QLD)
- Peter Lucas (NSW)
- Michael Lynagh (QLD)
- Mark McBain (QLD)
- Andy McIntyre (QLD)
- Brendan Moon (QLD)
- Simon Poidevin (NSW)
- Ross Reynolds (QLD)
- Chris Roche (QLD)
- Topo Rodriguez (NSW)
- Greg Martin (QLD) was selected but withdrew through injury
