= 1984 Australia rugby union tour of Britain and Ireland =

Summary
P	W	D	L
Total
18	13	1	4
Test match
4	4	0	0
Opponent
P	W	D	L
England
1	1	0	0
Wales
1	1	0	0
Ireland
1	1	0	0
Scotland
1	1	0	0

The 1984 Australia rugby union tour of Britain and Ireland was a series of 18 matches played by the Australia national rugby union team (the Wallabies) in Britain and Ireland between 17 October and 15 December 1984. The Australian team won 13 matches, drew one and lost four but notably won all four of their international matches.

The 1984 Wallabies were the first and only Australian side to achieve a Grand Slam doing so in four Tests against the Home Nations. This feat had been achieved five times previously, by the 1978 New Zealand All Blacks and by the South African Springboks during their tours of 1912–13, 1931–32, 1951–52 and 1960–61. Australia's outside half Mark Ella managed to score a try in every Test. The tour confirmed Australia's coming of age as a world-class rugby nation, marking the end of three difficult decades of inconsistent international performances from 1950 onwards.

== The squad's leadership ==
Alan Jones was experienced as a schoolboy coach but had coached only one season of first-grade rugby before his appointment to the national position. He led Manly to a victory in the 1983 Sydney 1st Grade Premiershipagainst the Randwick club. He was relatively unknown in senior Australian rugby at the time but sought the national coaching position while incumbent Bob Dwyer faced growing pressure. Under Dwyer in 1983 the Wallabies lost a two Test series against the French, tipping Dwyer's career record to the negative with six losses, five wins and a draw. Jones publicly announced his candidacy against Dwyer in early 1984, drawing on his professional background as a former Prime Ministerial speechwriter during media appearances. In February 1984 he was installed as the national coach and he set out from that point to select, train, guide and strategise Australian rugby to the summit of international success.

After failing to wrestle the Bledisloe Cup away from the All Blacks in mid-1984 (a 1–2 series loss), Jones set his sights on glory from the British Isles tour and the specific goal of winning all four of the Test matches and to eclipse the one win, three loss record of the 1981–82 Wallabies. To assist him, he selected Alec Evans, who had previously coached rugby union at Brisbane Grammar School while Jones was a teacher there. Evans became the first Assistant-Coach in the history of Wallaby tours. Tour Manager was former Wallaby Captain Charles "Chilla" Wilson who managed in the style of a "benevolent, big brother". Howell quotes Mark Ella "I couldn't think of a better manager. I played for Australia for six years. Thank God I had Chilla Wilson for three of them. With Jonesy up there dominating everything, Chilla was the perfect foil. He was quiet, unobtrusive and didn't make a lot of noise. In fact, you wouldn't know Chilla was the manager until the time came for somebody to get up and say the right thing"

Mark Ella had captained Australia in ten Tests prior to 1984, including the eleven match 1983 Australia rugby union tour of Italy and France. However Jones had resolved that whichever side won the 1984 interstate series would provide the captain and so Andrew Slack took up the tour captaincy Howell reports that he was a popular captain, a calm organiser both on and off the field. Quiet thoughtful and intelligent but also able to pull out his guitar and bring everyone together with a few songs. Ella is also quoted "Slacky was probably the only person who could have handled the captaincy in the British Isles. Every team needs a cornerstone and Slacky was it. We all had lots of respect for him....[on-field] his role was to settle the play down, be the link man. Not be happy-go-lucky or adventurous. Slack did it to perfection and always seemed to be there when he was wanted."

Jones also made a thoughtful choice in appointing his Manly club charge Steve Williams as vice-captain drawing on his front-foot leadership and strength as an enforcer. Ella is quoted again "When Alan Jones made Steve the senior forward, it was the best thing that could have happened. He took the responsibility and really drove the forwards. [With his] sensational jumping ....our line-out was complete"

== Tour itinerary ==
By 1984, long-duration Wallaby tours of Britain, France, and North America had been phased out. The expansion of commercial aviation allowed a Test tour of the four Home Nations to be completed within two months but with only eighteen matches played instead of the thirty of earlier years. Varsity teams were no longer part of the schedule which favoured quality City or regional representative sides for the mid-week fixtures. The traditions of a game against Combined Services and a final tour match against the Barbarians were continued.

Tradition was also maintained with a visit by the touring party to Buckingham Palace to meet The Queen. During the audience Wallaby breakaway Chris Roche leant on an antique table which broke and crashed to the ground. Nick Farr-Jones related that Her Majesty put the visitors at ease with a laugh and a resumption of conversation.

== Matches ==
Scores and results list Australia's points tally first.

	Date	Opponent	Location	Result	Score
Match 1	17 October	London Division	Twickenham, London	Won	22–3
Match 2	20 October	South and South West Division	County Ground, Exeter	Drew	12–12
Match 3	24 October	Cardiff	Cardiff Arms Park, Cardiff	Lost	12–26
Match 4	27 October	Combined Services	Aldershot Military Stadium, Aldershot	Won	44–9
Match 5	30 October	Swansea	St Helen's, Swansea	Won	17–7
Match 6	3 November	ENGLAND	Twickenham, London	Won	19–3
Match 7	6 November	Midlands Division	Welford Road, Leicester	Won	21–8
Match 8	10 November	IRELAND	Lansdowne Road, Dublin	Won	16–9
Match 9	14 November	Ulster	Ravenhill, Belfast	Lost	13–15
Match 10	17 November	Munster	Thomond Park, Limerick	Won	31–19
Match 11	20 November	Llanelli	Stradey Park, Llanelli	Lost	16–19
Match 12	24 November	WALES	Cardiff Arms Park, Cardiff	Won	28–9
Match 13	28 November	Northern Division	St Anthony's Road, Blundellsands	Won	19–12
Match 14	1 December	South of Scotland	Mansfield Park, Hawick	Lost	6–9
Match 15	4 December	Glasgow	Hughenden, Glasgow	Won	26–12
Match 16	8 December	SCOTLAND	Murrayfield, Edinburgh	Won	37–12
Match 17	12 December	Pontypool	Pontypool Park, Pontypool	Won	24–18
Match 18	15 December	Barbarians	Cardiff Arms Park, Cardiff	Won	37–30

The match against Swansea was abandoned after 60 minutes due to floodlight failure.

== Test matches ==
=== England ===
3 November 1984

England	3–19	Australia
Barnes (3 – 1pg)		(4 – 1t) Ella (4 – 1t) Poidevin (11 – 1t, 2c, 1pg) Lynagh

Twickenham, London
Attendance: 65,000
Referee: Bob Francis (New Zealand)

By half-time the score was 3–0 to Australia from a Michael Lynagh penalty goal but soon after the break came the first try of the match. Twenty-five metres from the English line, Ella received the ball from the scrum base and began to drift across the field with the ball in hand. Lynagh, Gould and David Campese all ran decoys off Ella at varying angles and the English defence were indecisive. Ella himself then changed pace and slid through the tiniest of openings for a try under the posts. Lynagh converted and later scored a try himself. The final try was a brilliant team effort. Farr-Jones had received the ball from the line-out and passed to Gould who threw a long wayward pass which Ella salvaged in safe hands while running and leaning forward at the same time. Finding the English defence lacking in numbers, Ella passed to Campese who took off to out-sprint English winger Rory Underwood. Ella was in support but marked by English debutant Stuart Barnes. Running out of space and about to be bundled into touch, Campese lofted a pass to Simon Poidevin, who scored the final try.

AUSTRALIA: Roger Gould, David Campese, Andrew Slack (c), Michael Lynagh, Brendan Moon, Mark Ella, Nick Farr-Jones, Topo Rodriguez, Tom Lawton Jnr, Andy McIntyre, Steve Williams, Steve Cutler, Simon Poidevin, Steve Tuynman, David Codey. Res: Matt Burke, Mark McBain, Stan Pilecki, Ross Reynolds, Phillip Cox, James Black

ENGLAND: Nick Stringer, John Carleton, Rob Lozowski, Bryan Barley, Rory Underwood, Stuart Barnes, Nigel Melville (c), Gareth Chilcott, Steve Mills (rep Steve Brain 30 mins), Gary Pearce, Jim Syddall, Nigel Redman, Jon Hall, Chris Butcher, Gary Rees. Res: Rob Andrew, Huw Davies, Richard Hill, Paul Simpson, Bob Hesford.

=== Ireland ===
10 November 1984

Ireland	9–16	Australia
Kiernan (9 – 3pg)		(10 – 1t, 2dg) Ella (6 – 1pg, 1dg) Lynagh

Lansdowne Road, Dublin
Attendance: 35,600
Referee: Bob Francis (New Zealand)

Lynagh's dropped goal was only the score in the first half and a second dropped goal, this time by Ella, put Australia 6–0 up shortly after half-time. Kiernan hit back with three successive penalties to give Ireland a 6–9 lead with seventeen minutes to go. Ella's second dropped goal of the game equalised at 9–9 and late in the game Ella delivered a try, appearing inside Campese to score after an Australian move and put Australia 13–9 ahead. Lynagh's penalty completed the scoring and Australia won 16–9.

IRELAND: Hugo MacNeill, Trevor Ringland, Brendan Mullin, Moss Finn, Mike Kiernan, Paul Dean, Michael Bradley, Phil Orr, Ciaran Fitzgerald (c), J. J. McCoy, Donal Lenihan, Willie Anderson, Phillip Matthews, Ronan Kearney, William Sexton. Res: Mick Fitzpatrick, Harry Harbison, Brian McCall, Rab Brady, Tony Ward, John Murphy

AUSTRALIA: Roger Gould, David Campese, Andrew Slack (c), Michael Lynagh, Matt Burke, Mark Ella, Nick Farr-Jones, Topo Rodriguez, Tom Lawton Jnr, Andy McIntyre, Steve Williams, Steve Cutler, Simon Poidevin, Steve Tuynman, Chris Roche. Res: David Codey, Stan Pilecki, Ross Reynolds, Phillip Cox, James Black, Michael Hawker

=== Wales ===
24 November 1984

Wales	9–28	Australia
Bishop (4 – 1t); Wyatt (5 – 1g, 1pg)		(4 – 1t) Tuynman (4 – 1t) Lawton (4 – 1t) Ella (4 – 1t) Lynagh (12 – 3c, 2pg) Gould

Cardiff Arms Park, Cardiff
Attendance: 63,000
Referee: Owen Doyle (Ireland)

The Test match venue was a wet and muddy Cardiff Arms, with the game played close among the forwards. Lawton's first try was scored within seven minutes resulting from a rehearsed move practised many times in training. Cutler won the jump in a short line-out, Poidevin set up the maul and Nick Farr-Jones made a blind-side run, putting Gould through a gap who passed to Peter Grigg. When Grigg was cornered he tossed a pass infield to Lawton who plunged over for the try.

Lyngah made it 13–0 when he scored between the posts after Farr-Jones again escaped up the short side from a scrum to set up a dazzling break by Campese. Poidevin, as ever was trailing Campo on the inside and took a pass then put Lynagh in for the try.

Halfway through the second-half a Wallaby scrum was set five metres out from the Welsh line. The Wallaby call "Samson" was made for an eight-man pushover and the Australian pack driven by its giant locks Williams and Steve Cutler set out to humiliate the Welsh eight and shove them back over the try line. The ground was taken and with the ball secure at the feet of the Wallaby second-row, Steve Tunyman fell onto it for a try and a 19–3 lead. Gould converted, then kicked a penalty goal.

However, Wales was not finished. Following a line-out close to the Australian line, Welsh halfback David Bishop leapt acrobatically to score a try, the only try scored against the Australians during the four grand slam tests. The rumour in Australia at the time was that Bishop had been released from jail in the previous week, to play in this match. Subsequently, Australia 'ran away' with it when Ella scored a final intercept try, to take the final score to 28–9.

AUSTRALIA: Roger Gould, David Campese, Andrew Slack (c), Michael Lynagh, Peter Grigg, Mark Ella, Nick Farr-Jones, Topo Rodriguez, Tom Lawton Jnr, Andy McIntyre, Steve Williams, Steve Cutler, Simon Poidevin, Steve Tuynman, David Codey. Res: Mark McBain, Stan Pilecki, Ross Reynolds, Phillip Cox, James Black, Matt Burke

WALES: Mark Wyatt, Mark Titley, Rob Ackerman, Mark Ring, Phil Lewis, Malcolm Dacey, David Bishop, Ian Stephens (rep Jeff Whitefoot 27 mins), Mike Watkins (c), Ian Eidman, John Perkins, Bob Norster, Alun Davies, Eddie Butler, Dai Pickering. Res: Gwyn Evans, Gareth Davies, Ray Giles, Billy James, Gareth Roberts

=== Scotland ===
8 December 1984

Scotland	12–37	Australia
Dods (12 – 4pg)		(4 – 1t) Farr-Jones (4 – 1t) Ella (8 – 2t) Campese (21 – 3c, 5pg) Lynagh

Murrayfield, Edinburgh
Attendance: 52,314
Referee: Stephen Hilditch (Ireland)

Mark Ella played a prominent role in the fourth Test of the tour. He threw a cut-out pass fifteen minutes into the match, leading to David Campese's first try and then in the second-half he executed a run-around with Roger Gould which got him over the line for his fourth try in as many matches. With fifteen minutes to go from a planned move off a two-man line-out Farr-Jones darted into the line-out to take the ball, scurry down the touchline and score in the corner.

AUSTRALIA: Roger Gould, David Campese, Andrew Slack (c), Michael Lynagh, Peter Grigg, Mark Ella, Nick Farr-Jones, Topo Rodriguez, Tom Lawton Jnr, Andy McIntyre, Steve Williams, Steve Cutler, Simon Poidevin, Steve Tuynman, David Codey. Res: Mark McBain, Stan Pilecki, Ross Reynolds, Phillip Cox, James Black, Tim Lane

SCOTLAND: Peter Dods, Peter Steven, Alexander Kennedy, Keith Robertson, Roger Baird, Douglas Wyllie, Roy Laidlaw (c), Alexander MacKenzie, Colin Deans, Iain Milne, Bill Cuthbertson, Alan Tomes, Jim Calder, John Beattie John Jeffrey. Res: Gerry McGuinness, Gary Callander, Tom Smith, Gordon Hunter, Andrew Ker, Jim Renwick

== Touring party ==
- Coach : Alan Jones
- Assistant coach: Alec Evans
- Tour manager: Chilla Wilson
- Captain: Andrew Slack
- Vice-captain : Steve Williams

=== Squad ===
Tour appearances include appearances as a replacement, which are shown in brackets e.g. (1R)

Name	Tests	Club	Career caps	Tour apps	Position	Pts
Roger Gould	4	Wests Brisbane	25	10	Full back	47
Brendan Moon	1	Brothers	35	4	Three-quarter	0
Andrew Slack (c)	4	Brisbane Souths	39	10	Three-quarter	16
Matt Burke	2	Randwick	23	9(1R)	Three-quarter	8
David Campese	4	Queanbeyan Whites	101	10(1R)	Three-quarter	24
Peter Grigg	1	City RFC (Townsville), Queensland Country	25	9	Three-quarter	20
James Black	4	Manly RUFC	4	8	Three-quarter	62
Michael Lynagh	4	University of Queensland	72	11(1R)	Three-quarter	98
Timothy Lane	1	Wests Brisbane	3	8	Three-quarter	4
Ross Hanley		Brothers		8	Three-quarter	4
Ian Williams		Eastwood Rugby Club		5	Three-quarter	24
Mark Ella	4	Randwick	25	10	Half-back	26
Nick Farr-Jones	4	Sydney University	63	10	Half-back	12
Phillip Cox	4	Manly RUFC	16	8	Half-back	4
Michael Hawker	1	Sydney University	25	9	Half-back	7
Simon Poidevin	4	Randwick	59	10	Back row	16
Chris Roche	1	University of Queensland	17	8	Back row	0
David Codey	4	Brisbane GPS	13	8	Back row	4
Ross Reynolds	4	Manly RUFC	10	9	Back row	0
Steve Tuynman	4	Eastwood Rugby Club	34	9	Back row	4
Bill Calcraft		Manly RUFC		10	Back row	0
Steve Williams (vc)	4	Manly RUFC	28	10	Lock	4
Steve Cutler	4	Gordon RFC	40	10	Lock	0
William Campbell		Wests Brisbane	22	8	Lock	4
Nigel Holt		Eastern Districts (Brisbane)	1	8	Lock	4
Tom Lawton, Jnr	4	Brisbane Souths	41	11	Hooker	4
Mark McBain	3	Brothers	7	8(1R)	Hooker	0
Topo Rodriguez	4	Warringah	26 (Aust)	10	Prop	4
Andy McIntyre	4	University of Queensland	38	10	Prop	0
Stan Pilecki	3	Wests Brisbane	18	8	Prop	0
Cameron Lillicrap		University of Queensland		4(1R)	Prop	0
Gregg Burrow		Sydney University		6(1R)	Prop	0

== Sources ==
- Collection (1995) Gordon Bray presents The Spirit of Rugby, Harper Collins Publishers Sydney
- Howell, Max (2005) Born to Lead – Wallaby Test Captains, Celebrity Books, Auckland NZ
- FitzSimons, Peter (1993) Nick Farr-Jones, The Authorised Biography Random House Sydney
- Ella, Mark & Smith, Terry (1987) Path to Victory: Wallaby Power in the 1980s ABC Books Sydney
- Prenter, Geoff (editor) (1997) The Greatest Games We Ever Played, Ironbark Press, Sydney – this essay Smith, Terry Australia v Wales 1984
- Stephen Jones, ed. (1985). Rothmans Rugby Yearbook 1985–86. Rothmans Publications Ltd. ISBN 0-356-10942-9.
