= David Campese =

Australian rugby union player (born 1962)

David Campese AM
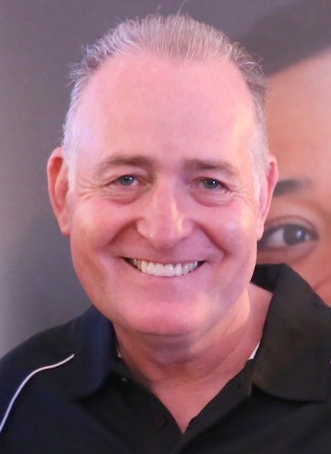
- Campese in Fiji, March 2020
- Born: David Ian Campese; 21 October 1962 (age 64) Queanbeyan, New South Wales, Australia
- Height: 180 cm (5 ft 11 in)
- Weight: 89 kg (196 lb)
- Notable relative: Terry Campese (nephew)

Rugby union career
- Position(s): Wing, Fullback
Amateur team(s)
| Years | Team | Apps | (Points) |
| 1981–1985 | Australian Capital Territory | | |
| 1982–1986 | Queanbeyan Whites | | |
| 1987–1998 | Randwick | | |
Senior career
| Years | Team | Apps | (Points) |
| 1984–1988 | Petrarca Padova | | |
| 1988–1993 | Amatori Rugby Milano | | |
Provincial / State sides
| Years | Team | Apps | (Points) |
| 1987–1998 | New South Wales | 34 | (84) |
Super Rugby
| Years | Team | Apps | (Points) |
| 1996–1998 | New South Wales Waratahs | 22 | (30) |
International career
| Years | Team | Apps | (Points) |
| 1982–1996 | Australia | 101 | (320) |
National sevens team
| Years | Team | | Comps |
| 1983–1998 | Australia | | |
Coaching career
- Years: Team
- 1998: Singapore
- 2005–2007: Sharks (assistant coach)
- 2010: Tonga sevens

Official website
- davidcampese.com
Medal record
Men's rugby union
Representing Australia
Rugby World Cup
| Gold medal – first place | 1991 England | Team |
Men's rugby sevens
Commonwealth Games
| Bronze medal – third place | 1998 Kuala Lumpur | Team |

David Ian Campese, AM (/kæmˈpiːzi/; born 21 October 1962), also known as Campo, is a former Australian rugby union player (1982–1996), who was capped by the Wallabies 101 times, and played 85 tests at wing and 16 at fullback.

He retired in 1996 and was awarded the Order of Australia in 2002 for his contribution to Australian rugby. Campese is now a media commentator, working in broadcasting and print media, and international guest speaker. He also works as an ambassador to businesses including Coca-Cola Amatil, DHL, Adidas, Ladbrokes, and Investec.

== Career summary ==
Campese debuted for the Wallabies on the 1982 Australia rugby union tour of New Zealand, during which he scored one try in each of his first two Tests. In 1983, he equalled the then Australian record for most tries in a Test, scoring four for Australia against the USA. He toured with the Eighth Wallabies for the 1984 Australia rugby union tour of Britain and Ireland that won rugby union's grand slam, the first Australian side to defeat all four home nations, England, Ireland, Wales and Scotland, on a tour. He was a member of the Wallabies on the 1986 Australia rugby union tour of New Zealand that beat the All Blacks 2–1, one of six international teams and second Australian team to win a test series in New Zealand. He participated in the inaugural 1987 Rugby World Cup, during which he broke the then world record for most tries scored by an international rugby player in the semi-final against France. Campese was a member of the Wallabies that won the 1991 Rugby World Cup,during which he was the tournament's equal leading try-scorer with six, and acclaimed "Player of the Tournament".

Campese won his second Bledisloe Cup in 1992 when the Wallabies defeated the All Blacks 2–1. During the 1992 Australia rugby union tour of South Africa, he scored his 50th career Test try against South Africa in Cape Town. He won his third Bledisloe Cup in 1994, playing for an Australian team that defeated New Zealand in a one-off Test. On the 1996 Australia rugby union tour of Europe, Campese became the first Australian rugby union player, and second international player, to reach the milestone of playing 100 Tests. He retired from international rugby at the end of tour, having played 101 tests and scored a then world-record 64 test tries. This record has since been overtaken by Daisuke Ohata (on 14 May 2006) and Bryan Habana.

At state level, Campese represented both the Australian Capital Territory and New South Wales. In 1983, he scored two tries, four conversions, and a penalty goal, in an Australian Capital Territory victory over Argentina. In 1991, he scored five tries for New South Wales in a 71–8 victory over Wales. At club level, Campese played for the Queanbeyan Whites from 1979 until 1986, and Randwick from 1987 to 1999. He won three consecutive grand finals with the Queanbeyan Whites from 1981 to 1983, and in the 1983 grand final he scored all of his team's points in a 29–12 victory, scoring four tries, two conversions and three penalty goals. He won eight grand finals with Randwick, including six consecutive victories from 1987 to 1992, as well as triumphs in 1994 and 1996.

Campese also played rugby union in Italy for nine years (1984/85-1992/93) during which he won the Top12 on five occasions with two teams. He played for Petrarca Padova from 1984/85 until 1987/88 and won the Italian Championship in his first three years with the club (1984/85-1986/87). In 1988, Campese transferred to Amatori where he won the Italian championship for the 1990/91 and 1992/93 seasons. He was awarded Player of the Year for his 1991/2 season.

Campese was also a renowned rugby sevens player. He made 12 appearances at the Hong Kong Sevens (1983–1990, 1993–94, 1997–98), during which he played in three victorious Australian campaigns (1983, 1985 and 1988), and was awarded the Leslie Williams Award for Player of the Tournament in 1988. In 1987, Campese won the New South Wales Sevens tournament, held at Concord Oval, playing for an Australian side that defeated New Zealand 22–12 in the final. In 1990, he participated in the 100th Melrose Sevens tournament playing for the victorious Randwick rugby club, during which he scored 44 of Randwick's 92 points. He participated in the inaugural Rugby World Cup Sevens tournament in 1993, held at Murrayfield in Edinburgh, Scotland, in which his Australian team lost to England 17–21 in the final. In 1998, he captained Australia to its first rugby sevens tournament victory in ten years at the Paris Sevens. He captained the Australian rugby sevens team at the 1998 Commonwealth Games to a bronze medal. In 2015, the Hong Kong Rugby Football Union (HKRFU) announced Campese as one of seven members of 'The Hong Kong Magnificent Sevens', the HKRFU's commemorative campaign to recognise the seven most formative players to have played in the past 40 Years of Sevens in Hong Kong.

He is famous for his "goose-step" — a hitch-kick motion which left opponents stumbling to try to tackle him.

== Early life and rugby career ==
David Campese was born to an Italian Father Gianantonio and an Irish Mother Joan Campese on 21 October 1962 in Queanbeyan, New South Wales. He had two sisters, Lisa and Corrina and one brother, Mario. In 1966 his family moved to Montecchio Precalcino for eighteen months before moving back to Australia and resettling in Queanbeyan.

Campese attended his local public school and Queanbeyan High School. He played rugby league for the Queanbeyan Blues from the age of eight to sixteen. At 16 he gave up all forms of rugby to play golf, winning the ACT-Monaro Schoolboys golf title in 1978.

Campese played his first game of rugby union for the Queanbeyan Whites in 1979 in fourth grade. The following year he was promoted to first grade. In 1981 he was promoted to the Australian under-21 squad and toured New Zealand. Shortly after, prior to the 1981–82 Australia rugby union tour of Britain and Ireland, he was selected in a 'trial match' but did not achieve national selection.

== International Test career ==
=== 1982 ===
==== Bledisloe Cup Test series ====
On the night of Australia's second Test against Scotland in 1982, ten Australian rugby players announced that for personal and business reasons they would not be available for the 1982 Australian tour to New Zealand, including the Wallabies' premier winger Brendan Moon. Following this announcement, Campese was selected for the tour.

Campese debuted for the Wallabies in a match against Manawatu in Palmerston North, in which he scored a solo try and kicked three goals from five attempts in a 26–10 victory. He played in the following game against Hawke's Bay at Napier and, two matches later, was chosen for his first Test.

- Australia 18 – New Zealand 33 (Auckland – 11 September 1982)

Campese played a central part in one of the biggest talking points of the third and final Test.

The Wallabies set a scoring record for an Australian rugby union tour of New Zealand by scoring 316 points in 14 matches, including 47 tries. This surpassed the achievement of the 1972 Australian team, which scored 229 in 13 matches.

This included a try and three successful goals kicked from five attempts in his debut match against Manawatu, two tries and a conversion (10 points) in the Wallabies' 11th tour game against Bay of Plenty (lost 16–40), and 13 points against North Auckland at Whangārei in the Wallabies' final game prior to the third Test of the series (won 16–12), in which Campese scored two tries, a penalty and a conversion, before being named 'man of the match'. He was also deprived of a try in the Wallabies' 12th match on tour against Counties when Counties player Alan Dawson, shoved Campese in the back and away from the ball before he could touch it down.

=== 1983 ===
Campese played seven Tests for Australia in 1983, including four Tests played in Australia, one against the USA, two against Argentina, and a single Bledisloe Cup Test against New Zealand, before embarking on the 1983 Australia rugby union tour of Italy and France.

- Australia 49 – United States 3 (Sydney – 9 July 1983)

Campese scored four tries in Australia's victory over the United States, equalling former Australian backrower Greg Cornelsen's record for the most tries in a Test match for an Australian, which he set in the third Test against the All Blacks in 1978.

==== Australia vs Argentina ====
Campese played three matches against Argentina, including two Test matches. On 20 July 1983 Campese played at fullback for the ACT and Southern NSW Rugby Union (ACT), scoring two tries, four conversions, and a penalty goal, in a 35–9 victory over the touring Argentinian side. The match was Argentina's second match on tour and the only loss they suffered in a provincial game on tour.

==== Bledisloe Cup Test (Sydney) ====
Campese played in the Wallabies' sole Bledisloe Cup Test of 1983 against the All Blacks, which was lost 18–8. Campese continued to substitute at full-back for the injured Roger Gould. Again, Australian coach Bob Dwyer recommended Randwick player Glen Ella for the full-back position in Gould's absence, but was overruled by his co-selectors.

==== Tour to Italy and France ====
- Australia 29 – Italy 7 (Rovigo – 22 October 1983)

Incumbent Australian fullback Roger Gould aggravated a thigh injury prior to the Test against Italy. However, Campese was selected on the wing, and Randwick fullback Glen Ella was selected in his second Test for Australia at fullback. Campese was assigned the goal-kicking duties against Italy.

- Australia 15 – France 15 (Clermont-Ferrard – 13 November 1983)

Roger Gould returned to the Australian team for the Test against France. However, due to an injury Gould sustained, Campese continued to perform the goal-kicking responsibilities for the Wallabies, following his goal-kicking performance against Italy.

- Australia 6 – France 15 (Paris – 19 November 1983)

Campese returned to the Australian team in the goal-kicker role, while playing winger, for its second Test against France at Parc des Princes, which they lost 6–15.

=== 1984 ===
- Australia 16 – Fiji 3 (Suva – 9 June 1984)

Australia played a Test against Fiji in Suva on 9 June 1984, in which Campese scored one try.

==== Bledisloe Cup Test series ====
- 1st Test: Australia 16 – New Zealand 9 (Sydney – 21 July 1984)

Campese was selected, along with Mark Ella, to share the goal-kicking responsibility for the first Test against New Zealand.

- 2nd Test: Australia 15 – New Zealand 19 (Brisbane – 4 August 1984)

Campese was assigned goal-kicking duties in this Test, and kicked a penalty to bring the score to 15-all with eight minutes left in the Test. The All Blacks scored a try in the final stages of the match to win 19–15.

==== Grand Slam ====
Campese was a member of the Eighth Wallabies for the 1984 Australia rugby union tour of Britain and Ireland that won rugby's "grand slam", the first Australian side to defeat all four home sides, England, Ireland, Wales and Scotland, on a tour. He played in 10 of the 18 tour matches, including all four Tests against the Home Nations and the final match against the Barbarians. He scored six tries on tour, more than any other Australian player – two of them in the final Test match against Scotland.

Campese played on the right wing in Australia's first tour match against London Division, won 22–3. He was switched to fullback for the Wallabies' second tour match against South and South West Division, drawn 12–12, and then rested for the third match of the tour against Cardiff (lost 12–16) with James Black selected at fullback and Ross Hanley on the wing. He returned to the side for Australia's fourth match on tour against Combined Services, in which he scored three tries and made the final pass for two more tries, scored by Bill Campbell and Andrew Slack, in an eight-try 44–9 victory. Campese was then rested for the Wallabies' fifth match on tour, and their final match before the first Test against England, won 17–7 against Swansea (after the match was abandoned due to floodlight failure).

Following Australia's first Test victory against England, Campese was rested for the seventh match on tour against Midlands Division.

Following Australia's second Test victory on tour against Ireland (won 16–9), Campese came-on as a late replacement in Australia's 9–16 loss to Ulster. He was rested for the next two tour matches against Munster (won 31–19) and Llanelli (lost 16–19), prior to the Wallabies' third tour Test against Wales, won 28–9. Some time between Australia's second Test victory over Ireland and its third Test over Wales, Campese fell ill with the flu.

Following the third Test of the tour against Wales, Campese scored a try in the final minutes of Australia's 19–12 victory over Northern Division – his fourth try on tour. The match against Northern Division was Campese's last provincial match on tour. Australia lost to South of Scotland 6–9 and defeated Glasgow 26–12 prior to its final Test against Scotland, won 35–12. Australia then defeated Pontpool 21–18 in their final provincial match prior to the tour-closing match against the Barbarians. The match against the Barbarians featured what Campese regards as one of his four greatest performances playing for the Wallabies.

- Australia 19 – England 3 (London – 3 November 1984)

In the first international test of the Grand Slam tour Campese almost scored early on by chasing a high kick from Michael Lynagh. Australia settled later on after tries from Ella and Lynagh, before Campese was to make a break down the left leading to a try. With 14 minutes left in the Test, Australia's left wing Brendan Moon suffered a broken arm in a tackle. Australian winger Matt Burke replaced Moon, moving to the right wing, and shifting Campese to play on the left wing.

- Australia 28 – Wales 9 (Cardiff – 24 November 1984)
- Australia 37 – Scotland 12 (Murrayfield – 8 December 1984)

Campese scored two tries in the Test against Scotland – the first tries Campese scored at Test level on the 1984 Tour to the United Kingdom.

- Australia 37 – Barbarians 30 (Cardiff – 18 December 1984)

Australia played against the Barbarians one week after winning the Grand Slam. That match is perhaps best remembered for Campese's zig-zagging run that turned Welsh centre Robert Ackerman inside out in the process, before Campese, opting not to run past Ackerman in the process of confounding him, but rather offered himself to be tackled before passing the ball to Michael Hawker for a try.

=== 1985 ===
Australia commenced their 1985 Test season with a two-Test series against Canada, in which Campese did not play due to injury." Campese also did not play in the single Bledisloe Cup Test in 1985, lost 9–10 to New Zealand. In Path to Victory former Australian rugby player Mark Ella wrote that, "Without David Campese, our backs seemed to have forgotten how to score tries."

==== Australia v Fiji (1985) ====
Campese returned to the Australian Test side later in 1985 for a two-Test series against Fiji. Australia won the first Test 52–28 and the second Test 31–9.

=== 1986 ===
- Australia 39 – Italy 18 (Brisbane – 1 June 1986)

Campese scored two tries against Italy in Australia's first Test of the season. By scoring his 14th Test try, he equalled Australian winger Brendan Moon's record for most Test tries scored by an Australian player. By scoring his 15th Test try, Campese broke this record. He also became the third Australian to score 100 career Test match points.

- Australia 27 – France 14 (Sydney – 21 June 1986)

Campese was moved to fullback for the injured Roger Gould in a one-off game against France, scoring a try in the 26th minute.

==== Australia v Argentina ====
Campese continued to play at fullback in Australia's 1986 two-Test home series against Argentina, substituting for the injured Australian fullback Roger Gould.

Following several performances from Campese that garnered critical acclaim, Australian coach Alan Jones proclaimed Campese to be "the Bradman of rugby". Jones said that Campese had a special talent that nobody else in rugby was as talented as him. Jones' proclamation was well documented by the Australia media and had a detrimental effect on Campese. As the weight of expectation grew, so too did the criticisms for any mistake Campese made.

==== Bledisloe Cup Test series ====
Campese was a member of the 1986 Australia Wallabies that defeated the All Blacks in New Zealand and became the second Australian team to beat the All Black in New Zealand in a rugby union Test series.

Campese played fullback in the first two Tests of the Test series versus New Zealand, before being moved to wing in the final Test.

- 1st Test: Australia 13 – New Zealand 12 (Wellington – 9 August 1986)

Three moments involving Campese are frequently recorded in reports of the first Test against New Zealand:

"From a scrum win, Nick Farr-Jones made a glorious break on the open side, stumbled, and when tackled, Campese was there with razor-sharp reactions to toe the ball over the line and dive on it for a try that gave Lynagh a simple conversion." Also "From Farr-Jones, the ball spun to Brett Papworth, then to Campese, who held up the pass until winger John Kirwan was lured infield from Burke. Campese then tossed the ball to Burke, who pulled it in to have a clear run to the corner." And finally "Campese, having scored one try and created another, had a significant role in the third, this time for the All Blacks. His infield pass when tackled near halfway finished in the arms of All Black centre Joe Stanley. He swept downfield and, when taken by Lynagh, slipped a pass to flanker Mark Brooke-Cowden for the try."

- 2nd Test: Australia 12 – New Zealand 13 (Dunedin – 23 August 1986)

Australia lost the second Bledisloe Cup Test of 1986 to New Zealand 12–13. Following the Test, claims were made that Australian coach Alan Jones made derogatory remarks about Campese's performance, after the fullback dropped a few 'high-kicks' in very wet conditions. Campese asserted that later that day during the night-time he visited Jones in his hotel room and tried to apologise for his mistakes, which resulted in a verbal barrage of insults from Jones which lasted many minutes. Jones is reported to have told Campese that, "I told the papers you were the Bradman of rugby – now you've let me down."

In David Campese (1996) Gordon Bray wrote that: "So distraught was he in a nightclub a few hours later, that he declared he was ready to retire from rugby. It was distressing to see such a gifted athlete and entertainer so despondent and agitated. The world's rugby enthusiasts can be grateful that Mark Ella consoled his teammate that night."

Years later in Wallaby Gold: The History of Australian Test Rugby (2003) Alan Jones contested the accusations of slander saying:

That's just rubbish. I'm sure I've said to someone with a smile on my face we played without a fullback today. And I'm sure it was Campo, after he's probably done one or two bad things and 15 good things. It would be like telling Miss World she was the ugliest person in the room when she knows full well she's the best looking bird who's ever set foot in the building. But it wasn't that day. That wasn't the day for that sort of stuff. But it doesn't matter. It's part of the folklore of the whole deal and it's one man's word against another's."

- 3rd Test: Australia 22 – New Zealand 9 (Auckland – 6 September 1986)

In Path to Victory: Wallaby Power in the 1980s the Daily Mirror's Terry Smith writes that, "One very famous player was in danger of losing his Test spot in New Zealand until his team-mates urged Jones to retain him." Jones selected Campese on the wing for the final test instead of fullback. This Test marked the first time Campese opposed All Black winger John Kirwan.

=== 1987 ===
==== Rugby World Cup ====
Campese wrote that, "the first-ever World Cup, in 1987, was ultimately a disaster both for Australia and for me personally." Campese played throughout the entire 1987 World Cup impeded by injury. He missed a pre-World Cup Test match against South Korea in Brisbane due to injury, however, he made a return to the Wallabies for their first World Cup pool match against England.

- World Cup pool match: Australia 19 – England 6 (Sydney – 23 May 1987)

Campese was involved in the biggest controversy of his first World Cup game. Rugby writer Peter Jenkins records that, "It took 10 minutes into the second half for Australia to score their first try, a controversial one, when Campese went across. He placed the ball on the knee of English rival Rory Underwood before it bounced away and Lynagh grounded it over the English line. But referee Keith Lawrence had already awarded the try to Campese" Campese later said "The chief talking-point was the fact that I was awarded a try which I never touched down properly. It was not a score. If you study the video, it is obvious that I was not happy with the decision the referee made."

- World Cup pool match: Australia 47 – USA 21 (Brisbane – 31 May 1987)

Rugby writer Peter Jenkins wrote "Campese, criticised the week before by Jones for indifferent defence, received after this game a one-word endorsement from the coach: 'Fantastic.' Campese scored a try, his 23rd, just one short of the world record."

- World Cup pool match: Australia 42 – Japan 23 (Sydney – 3 June 1987)

Playing at fullback, Campese scored his 24th Test try in Australia's World Cup pool match against Japan, equaling the then world record for tries with Ian Smith of Scotland (1924–33).

- World Cup Quarter-Final: Australia 33 – Ireland 15 (Sydney- 7 June 1987)
- World Cup Semi-Final: Australia 24 – France 30 (Sydney – 13 June 1987)

Campese has called this match the most memorable Test he ever played for Australia. He scored his world record 25th Test try six minutes into the second half of the semi-final, surpassing Scotland winger Ian Smith's 54-year-old record for most international Test tries.

- World Cup play-Off for Third: Australia 21- Wales 22 (Rotorua – 18 June 1987)

==== 1987 Bledisloe Cup Test (Sydney) ====
Campese continued his injury-impeded season by playing right wing in the one-off Bledisloe Cup Test, a month after the Rugby World Cup. Campese recollected "It was not a memorable month or two, and later in the year I had to drop out of a major Wallaby tour for the one and only time in my career, when an x-ray of my ankle before we went to Argentina revealed the bone had cracked in half."

=== 1988 ===
==== Australia vs England ====
Campese returned to Test level rugby following his ankle injury for the two-Test series against England.

- Australia 22 – England 16 (Brisbane – 29 May 1988)

==== Bledisloe Cup Test series ====
Campese marked All Black winger John Kirwan for all three Tests in the series. Campese later confessed that Kirwan's excellent performances against him affected his confidence, such that his mother sent him a poem titled Winners Take Chances. For the rest of his career, Campese would read the poem before every Test he played in.

- Australia 7 – New Zealand 32 (Sydney – 2 July 1988)
- Australia 19 – New Zealand 19 (Brisbane – 16 July 1988)

Following the Wallabies' first Test defeat, the Australian team management planned to move Campese to the fullback position for the second Test, replacing Andrew Leeds. However, Australian flyhalf Michael Lynagh injured himself with a badly corked thigh in the second half of Queensland's 12–27 loss to the All Blacks, leaving Australia without a recognised goal-kicker. Randwick player Lloyd Walker was then selected at flyhalf, Leeds was reinstated at fullback so Australia could have a goal-kicker to replace Lynagh, and Campese moved back to the left-wing position. The final score of 19–19 was the only time the All Blacks did not win a game from 1987 until late 1990.

- Australia 9 – New Zealand 30

==== Australian tour of England, Scotland and Italy ====
Campese scored 15 tries on tour and achieved a personal total of 72 points. While Australia struggled in the early stages of the tour, Campese's form was lauded by British critics.

Campese, along with Wallaby captain Nick Farr-Jones, was then rested and selected on the bench for Australia's fourth match on tour, a 10–16 loss to South-West Division. Bolstered by the return of Michael Lynagh to the Australian team, Campese regained selection for Australia's fifth provincial game against Midlands Division, in which he was instrumental in setting-up Brad Girvan for a try in the 60th minute. In the sixth match on tour against England Students, Campese scored two tries, kicked three conversions and two penalties, scoring 20 points in a 36–13 victory.

Campese played in Australia's ninth match on tour against South of Scotland. The Sydney Morning Herald rugby writer Greg Growden reported that, "Australia fully deserved to be 23–0 ahead at halftime after well-crafted tries by Niuqila, Gourley and David Campese, who left the field in the 30th minute with a slight groin strain." Campese was then rested for the 10th match on tour against North and Midlands of Scotland.

- Australia 19 – England 28 (London – 5 November 1988)
- Australia 32 – Scotland 13 (Edinburgh – 19 November 1988)

Campese scored two tries in a 32–13 victory over the Scottish rugby team, in which Australia scored five tries to Scotland's two. Former Wallaby captain Andrew Slack, author of Noddy: The Official Biography of Michael Lynagh, wrote that, "Australia won 32–13 and although Lynagh was successful with only five kicks from eleven attempts, two delicate chip kicks provided tries for David Campese and ensured the restoration of Australia's rugby reputation." Slack further wrote that, "Campese had been the undoubted star of the tour, and that was made clear by the four youngsters who ran up and down the Murrayfield pitch after the game waving a large banner reading 'David Campese Walks on Water.'

- Australia 40 – 22 Barbarians (Cardiff – 26 November 1988

In the 15th minute of the second half of the game, Campese received a cut-out pass on the left-wing while temporarily unmarked. He then produced a run where he beat about seven Barbarians players, that brought play to the Barbarian 22-metre line. After offloading the ball and keeping the play of the game going, Campese got to his feet and re-positioned himself in the first receiver position. Campese scored the second of his two tries with the final play of the game, prompting the crowd at Cardiff Arms Park to give him a standing ovation. He has described this try as his best try in international rugby.

- Australia 55 – Italy 6 (Rome – 3 December 1988)

Campese concluded the tour with three tries against Italy.

=== 1989 ===
==== Australia vs British Lions ====
The British Lions toured Australia for a three-Test series, which Australia lost 1–2. The series is perhaps best known for "Campo's Corner" – a mistake Campese made in the third and deciding Test in the series. When under pressure under his own posts he attempted a pass to Greg Martin, but the pass fell short and was picked up for a try by Ieuan Evans. Campese's error made the scoreline 12–13, following Gavin Hastings' missed conversion, costing Australia four points. The Lions' forwards took over the Test, and surged ahead to a 19–12 lead.

Following Campese's famous mistake, the Wallabies had an attacking opportunity from set-piece play, and Michael Lynagh called a move that, if executed properly, would have led to Campese scoring under the posts.

- 2nd Test: Australia 12 – British Lions 19 (Brisbane – 8 July 1989)
- 3rd Test: Australia 18 – British Lions 19 (Sydney – 15 July 1989)

In the first half of the series-deciding Test Campese recovered the rugby ball in-goal and successfully 'dummied' past Lions' winger Ieuan Evans, ran the ball beyond Australia's 22, and obtained a large territorial gain for Australia.

==== Bledisloe Cup Test (Auckland) ====
- Australia 12 – All Blacks 24

==== Australia rugby union tour ====
During the 1989 Australia rugby union tour, Australia played a two-Test series against France.

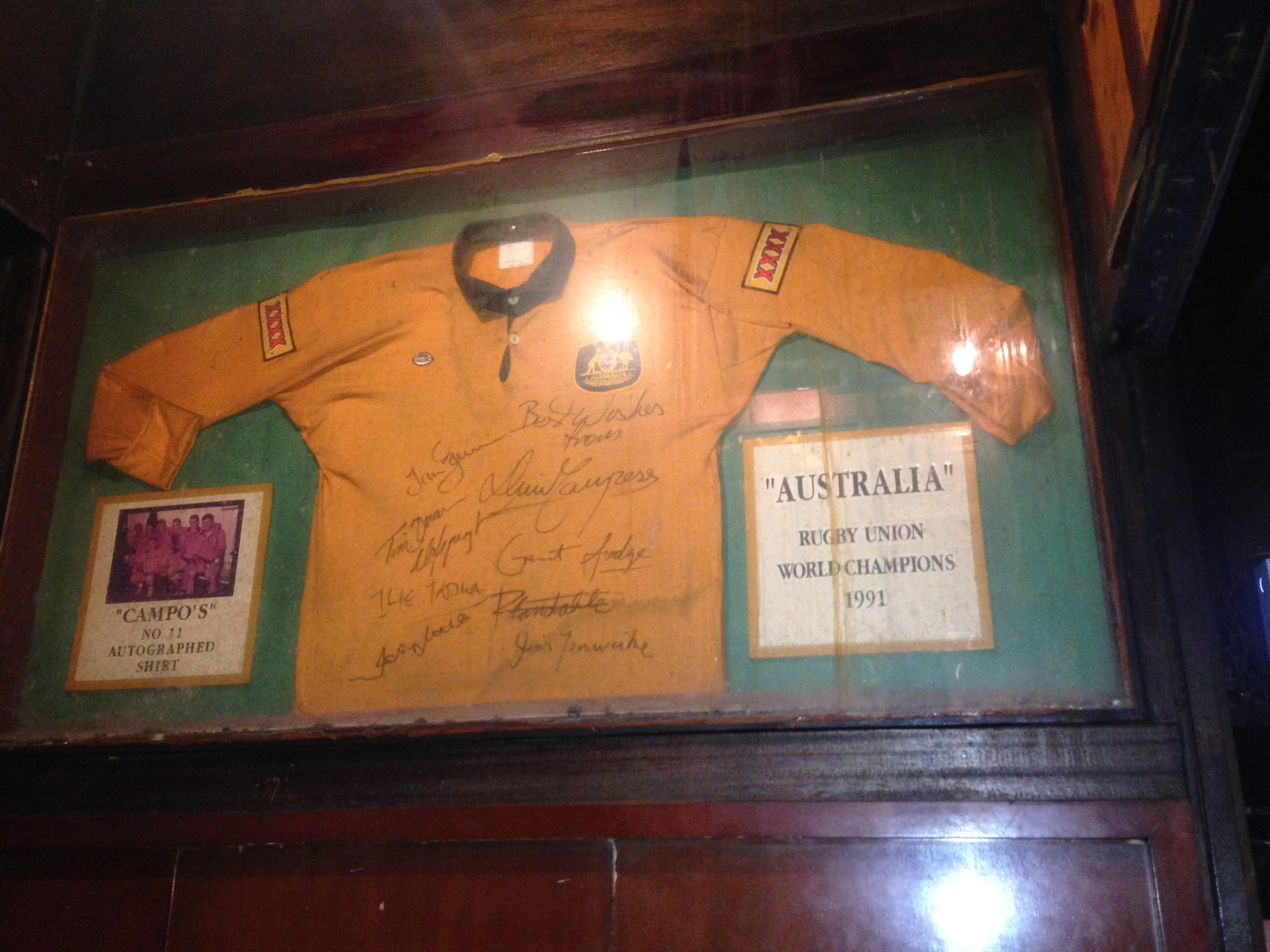
Tim Horan confused the words "Nice" and "niece".

This was the first major overseas tour that new Wallabies' centre Tim Horan would undertake with Campese. Campese announced plans to travel to Nice while the Wallabies were based in Toulose. Horan is alleged to have responded, "What's everybody going down to see Campo's niece for?"

- Australia 32 – France 15 (Strasbourg – 4 November 1989)*

Following a halftime score of 10–12, Australia scored three of its four tries in the second half. In the 62nd minute, Campese stopped a French backline movement with a tackle on Stéphane Weller, that forced his opposite winger to "knock the ball on". The game continued with an Australian attacking scrum, from which Nick Farr-Jones executed a box-kick that wasn't properly fielded by French winger Stéphane Weller. Campese toed the ball forward and followed it. He kicked the ball forward again and was able to fall on it score Australia's third try in the 63rd minute of the game. Campese was involved in Australia's fourth and final try of the Test during the final play of the game. He occupied French centre Philippe Sella with a goosestep, before delivering the final pass to Tim Horan who scored his second try in the Test.

- Australia 19 – France 25 (Lille – 11 November 1989)

France won the second Test played in Lille 25 to 19. Campese played his 48th Test in this match.

=== 1990 ===
==== Australia vs France ====
Campese was dropped from an Australian Test side for the first time since his debut for the Wallabies in New Zealand on the 1982 tour. Campese was omitted because he did not return early enough from Italy and therefore Australian selectors could not assess his form in a club match.

- 2nd Test: Australia 48 – France 31 (Brisbane – 24 June 1990)
- 3rd Test: Australia 19 – France 28 (Sydney – 30 June 1990)

Campese returned to the fullback role for the third Test against France – a game that marked his 50th Test for Australia. He became the second person, after Simon Poidevin, to reach this milestone.

- Australia 67 – U.S.A. 9 (Brisbane – 8 July)

Prior to Australia's three-Test tour to New Zealand, Australia played a one-off Test against the US, in which Campese played. The Test contains the only instance in Campese's career where he successfully completed a drop-goal.

==== Bledisloe Cup Test series ====
- Australia 6 – New Zealand 21 (Christchurch – 21 July 1990)

Campese played his 52nd Test for Australia in Australia's first Test against New Zealand in 1990, becoming the most-capped Australian rugby player in history, surpassing Simon Poidevin's record of 51 Tests.

- Australia 17 – New Zealand 27 (Auckland – 4 August 1990)

Campese was selected at fullback for the second Test against New Zealand, replacing Greg Martin who was dropped following the first Test.

- Australia 21 – New Zealand 9 (Wellington – 18 August 1990)

=== 1991 ===
Prior to Australia's first international Test of 1991 against Wales, Campese played for the New South Wales Waratahs in a 71–8 victory over the touring Welsh team, in which he scored five tries.

- Australia 63 – Wales 6 (Brisbane – 21 July 1991)

==== England rugby union tour of Australia and Fiji ====
Campese played for the Wallabies in a single Test against England during the 1991 England rugby union tour of Australia and Fiji

- Australia 40 – England 15 (Sydney – 27 July 1991)

==== Bledisloe Cup Test series ====
- Australia 21 – New Zealand 12 (Sydney – 10 August 1991)
- Australia 3 – New Zealand 6 (Auckland – 24 August 1991)

==== Rugby World Cup ====
- Pool match – Australia 32 – 19 Argentina (Llanelli – 4 October 1991)
- Pool match – Australia 9 – Western Samoa 3 (Pontypool – 9 October 1991)

In this match he became the first person to play 60 Test matches for Australia.

- Pool match – Australia 38 – Wales 3 (Cardiff – 12 October 1991)
- Quarter-final – Australia 19 – Ireland 18 (Dublin – 20 October 1991)

Campese scored the first try of the Test in the first half of the World Cup Quarter-final off a backline move. He scored his second try off a move entitled "cut-two-loop", a move Australia also called in the final moments of the quarter-final to score a Test-winning try.

- Semi-final – Australia 16 – 6 New Zealand (Dublin – 27 October 1991)

Campese's performance in the 1991 Rugby World Cup semi-final has been described by former Australian coach Bob Dwyer as Campese's signature Test in his career. In an ABC documentary entitled The Rise and Rise of Australian Rugby Dwyer stated that, "I must say that throughout the 1991 World Cup, and this semi-final match in particular, Campo was a standout performer. We all know what a great player he was over such a long period of time, but I'm sure that his first-half performance that day has never been beaten."

Prior to the start of the Test, Campese did not stand in-front of the haka, instead opting to practice his kicking downfield.

Greg Growden in the Sydney Morning Herald documented Campese's performance by writing that, "Campese scored possibly the most exhilarating solo try of the tournament, and inspired another team try which was possibly even better, to prove he is the best attacking player in the world, and definitely the best competitor of this World Cup. Campese is the Pelé of world Rugby."

In Running Rugby Mark Ella wrote of Campese's pass to Tim Horan that, "Campese's over-the-shoulder pass to Tim Horan in the World Cup semifinal against New Zealand in 1991 must be ranked as close to the ultimate of its type. I cannot think of another player in the world who could have managed it."

Following the Test The Independent quoted former Ireland fly-half Tony Ward saying of Campese that, "He is the Maradona, the Pelé of international Rugby all rolled into one. You cannot put a value on his importance to our game. He is a breath of fresh air and I think perhaps the greatest player of all time. Without being too soppy, it was an honour to be at Lansdowne Road just to see him perform."

Clem Thomas of The Observer wrote following the Test that, "it will always be remembered as Campese's match..." In 2013 former New Zealand rugby player Sean Fitzpatrick wrote that, "One man can never win a match on his own but he came as close to that as is possible with his display in the 1991 World Cup semi-final. We were beaten by half-time." British rugby writer Stephen Jones added, "If I had to put together the greatest rugby match I've ever seen I'd have the first half of Australia versus New Zealand in '91 in Dublin…"

- Final – Australia 12 – 6 England (London – 2 November 1991)

Following England's 1991 Rugby World Cup semi-final victory over Scotland in a tryless Test, Campese led a media campaign designating England as a boring rugby team. He said that if he played for England, he would insist on playing the flyhalf position because it would be the only way he could touch the ball. He was quoted as saying, "I wouldn't play for England even if you paid me" and "Playing that sort of boring stuff is a good way to destroy the image of the game. They're all so scared of losing over here they won't try anything." He further added that 'England would never beat us in the World Cup because they are a bunch of Toffs, and we are convicts.'

Campese was involved in the biggest controversy of the World Cup Final in the 69th minute. English flanker Peter Winterbottom attempted a pass to Campese's opposing winger Rory Underwood, who at that stage "may have had an overlap," when Campese knocked the ball forward. The referee ruled it a deliberate knock-on and awarded England a penalty." The English hooker, Brian Moore, thought the referee should have awarded a penalty try.

Campese was named Player of the Tournament, He was the tournament's equal leading try scorer along with Jean-Baptiste Lafond with six. French rugby newspaper Midi-Olimpique named him number one in its World Rugby Top 10. He was also voted the 1991 Australian Society of Rugby Writers Player of the Year, winning the award by a record margin by scoring 64 points, 39 points more than John Eales in second place with 25. Jack Pollard wrote that "it was the genius of David Campese that made Australia world champions." Australia's 1991 World Cup captain, Nick Farr-Jones, stated that without Campese, Australia might not have won the World Cup.

=== 1992 ===
- Australia 37 – Scotland 13 (Brisbane – 21 June August 1992)

Campese left the field due to injury, to be replaced by Peter Jorgensen.

- Australia 26 – South Africa 3 (Cape Town – 22 August 1992)

This was South Africa's second Test at international level since the International Rugby Board (IRB) banned them from playing international Test-level rugby due to apartheid boycotts. Campese became the first Australian to play 70 Test matches and he became the first rugby player to score 50 tries.

==== Australia rugby union tour of Europe ====
Prior to the 1992 Australia rugby union tour of Europe Campese was frequently rested due to ongoing injury concerns and missed most of Australia's provincial games.

He played in both Tests on tour, against Ireland and Wales, and the traditional tour-closing game against the Barbarians. He was the Wallabies' top try-scorer on tour with four (despite only playing six games on tour).

Australian team management selected a full-strength side, including Campese, for the team's first match against Leinster (won 35–11). Leinster scored the first try in the early stages of the match, after Campese failed to properly tackle his opposite winger Niall Woods, allowing Woods to score a try. However, after the Wallabies trailed 6–8 at half-time, Campese scored two tries in the second half – one off a Tim Horan scissors' pass and the second off a Michael Lynagh inside-pass from a set-play.

Campese did not play in Australia's second match on tour, a famous 19–22 loss to Munster. He returned to the side for their third match on tour against Ulster (won 35–11).

In the Wallabies' final match prior to their first Test on tour against Wales, Campese came off the bench in the second half of Australia's 14–6 victory over Connacht.

Following Australia's Test victory over Ireland, Campese was rested and not named in Australia's next five provincial matches prior to the following Test against Wales – against Swansea (lost 6–21), Wales B (won 24–11), Neath (won 16–9), Llanelli (lost 9–13), and Monmouthshire (won 19–9).

=== 1993 ===
- Australia 52 – Tonga 14 (Brisbane – 4 July 1993)

==== Australia vs South Africa ====
- Australia 12 – South Africa 19 (Sydney – 31 July 1993)

Early in the first Test against South Africa, Campese was involved in a scuffle with Springboks' Pieter Muller and James Small.

Australia led South Africa 9–0 after 16 minutes following three penalty goals kicked by Marty Roebuck. However, in the final 10 minutes of the first half, Springbok inside centre Heinrich Füls executed a kick, forcing Campese to run back and field it, while he and Springbok outside centre Pieter Muller gave chase. Campese was unable to field the ball, and instead slipped over the ball about a metre from the Australian try-line, allowing Muller to gather the ball and score the try.

In the documentary of Campese's career, Campese: Rugby's My Life, Campese confessed that he perhaps "tried too hard" in this Test, trying to compensate for his early mistake.

Following Campese's first Test performance, Alec Evans, the assistant coach of Australia's 1984 Grand Slam side, went public suggesting that Campese should be dropped from the Australian side.

- Australia 28 – South Africa 20 (Brisbane – 14 August 1993)

Campese recovered from his first Test performance to help Tim Horan score a try in the second Test. Australia had a scrum in their own territory and Campese was in position for a clearing kick. Campese instead opted to run and dummied past South African openside flanker Francois Pienaar. Campese's run brought play into South African territory. Campese then flicked a pass along the ground, described by Australian rugby commentator David Fordham as an 'ill-disciplined pass', that Australian eightman Tim Gavin recovered. Two phases later Campese took a pass from Nick Farr-Jones in the first-receiver position, launched a high kick that his opposite winger Jacques Olivier wasn't able to field. The ball took a fortuitous bounce, and Tim Horan was able to chase the ball down and fall upon it to score a try.

- Australia 19 – South Africa 12 (Sydney – 21 August 1993)

In My Game Your Game Campese called the third Test against South Africa from 1993 one of the greatest performances of his career. "When I think back over my Test career, it seems most of my best performances have been outside Australia, such as the 1991 Rugby World Cup in Britain, the 1988 tour, and the Grand Slam trip of 1984," he said. "There have been some good moments at home, such as the third Test against South Africa at the Sydney Football Stadium in 1993".

Following the first two Tests of the series, Campese noticed that following short kick-offs, when mauls would be formed, his opposite South African winger would stand further than 20 metres behind the contest for the ball. Prior to the Test, Campese arranged with Nick Farr-Jones that if he saw his opposite winger standing far in the backfield, he would call "Leaguey" to signal to Farr-Jones to attempt a blindside move with him. During the 19th minute of the second half of the third Test Australia formed a rolling maul in their own half. Nick Farr-Jones (playing his last Test for Australia) linked with Campese for the last time in their representative careers. He went down the blind-side and passed the ball to Campese, who ran past South Africa scrum-half Robert du Preez. Campese ran along the sideline and brought play into South African territory. He then gave an inside pass to Farr-Jones in support, who in turn passed the ball inside to Tim Gavin in support. Gavin ran the ball into contact. The ball came back to Farr-Jones from the ruck, he handed it on to Phil Kearns, who gained metres for Australia with a strong run. As the next stage of play developed, Campese had re-positioned himself in the centres where he took a pass, made a tiny break, and lofted a pass over several South African players to Tim Horan in support, who went on to score a try in the 59th minute of the Test.

Campese received the man of the match award for his performance. Following this game, Spiro Zavos in The Sydney Morning Herald called Campese "the Mozart of rugby."

==== Australia rugby union tour ====
Campese toured with the Wallabies for their 1993 Australia rugby union tour, which included a Test against Canada and two Tests against France.

- Australia 43 – Canada 16 (Calgary – 9 October 1993)

=== 1994 ===
==== Australia vs Italy ====
Campese was a member of the Wallabies for a two-Test series against Italy during the 1994 Italy rugby union tour of Australia.

- Australia 23 – Italy 20

Campese was capped for the 84th time.

- Australia 20 – Italy 7 (Melbourne – 25 June)

Campese scored a controversial try. Jack Pollard wrote "Campese got his 59th Test try because of a lucky decision with South African referee Ian Rogers clearly erred in ruling that Campese grounded the ball before he was pushed over the sideline."

==== Australia vs Western Samoa ====
- Australia 73 – Western Samoa 3

Campese regards his performance in this match to be one of his four best performances for the Wallabies (along with the 1984 and 1988 Barbarians matches and the 1991 Rugby World Cup semi-final against New Zealand). Campese scored the first try of the Test when, while about to be tackled into touch, he executed a chip kick, followed it through, and scooped the ball off the ground for one of his greatest tries.

=== 1995 ===
==== Australia vs Argentina ====
- Australia 53 v Argentina 7 (Sydney – 6 May 1995)
- Australia 30 v Argentina 13 (Sydney – 6 May 1995)

Campese scored two tries in the Wallabies' second Test against the Pumas in 1995. Following this Test Campese would go scoreless for his next six Tests, until a Test against Canada 14 months later.

==== Rugby World Cup ====
- Pool match: Australia 18 – South Africa 27 (Cape Town – 25 May 1995)

Campese played in Australia's first pool match against South Africa at the 1995 Rugby World Cup

- Quarter finals: Australia 22 – England 25 (Cape Town – 11 June 1995)

==== Bledisloe Cup ====
Campese was dropped from the Australian team for their first Bledisloe Cup Test match against New Zealand in Auckland. Following an injury to Australian fullback Matt Burke in the first Bledisloe Cup Test of 1995 in Auckland, the Australian selectors picked Rod Kafer to take Burke's place in the Australian team. Kafer suffered a broken leg during a training session. Campese was recalled to a training session with the Wallabies, with the information that if Burke proved his fitness, he would not play in the second Bledisloe Cup Test. Burke recovered from his injury to play in the second Bledisloe Cup Test. However, another injury to Australian centre Daniel Herbert led to Campese's selection on the bench in the second Bledisloe Cup Test of 1995.

- 2nd Bledisloe Cup Test: Australia 23 – New Zealand 34 (Sydney – 29 July 1995)

The second Bledisloe Cup Test marked the first and only time in Campese's rugby career where he started a Test on the bench. Australian winger Damien Smith suffered an injury in the first half of the second Bledisloe Cup Test allowing Campese to play his 92nd Test for Australia, coming off the bench as a substitute in the second half. This Test marked the only time Campese directly opposed All Black winger Jonah Lomu in a Test.

In Campo: Still Entertaining Campese reflects that, "As chance would have it, Jonah got the ball in the opening stages of the second half and ran straight at me… I think I shut my eyes, but I tackled him. Later in the half he pushed me aside to score a try, but I could at least claim to have cut him down once." Following the Test Campese and Lomu met in the changing rooms and exchanged their jerseys. Campese's 92nd Test marked the last Test he would play in the amateur era.

=== 1996 ===
In 1996 Bob Dwyer was replaced as coach of the Australian rugby union team by Greg Smith. Campese later wrote that, "It gave me some early hope of forcing my way back. I don't know for sure that Bob had written me off as a Test player. But judging by those closing months of the 1995 season, it would not have been too promising for me, I suspect, had he held on to the Wallaby post."

Regarding his decision to continue playing Test level rugby Campese writes that, "In the end, my decision to play on was taken with one overriding goal in mind. I wanted to end my Test career on a high note. Not with an appearance off the bench in a Bledisloe Cup loss to the All Blacks." He further adds that, "the prospect of playing 100 Tests had enormous appeal too… But, to be perfectly honest, the initial aim was just to get back in the starting side." Campese was selected for the Australian team for the first eight Tests of their 1996 season, before being dropped following his 100th Test against Italy. He would play one more Test for Australia against Wales in the Wallabies final Test of the year.

==== Australia vs Wales ====
- Australia 56 – Wales 25 (Brisbane – 8 June 1996)

Campese played his first professional Test match for Australia in this Test against Wales.

- Australia 74 – Canada 9 (Brisbane – 29 June)

Campese scored his 64th and final international Test try in Australia's 74–9 defeat of Canada. It was Campese's first Test try in 14 months.

==== Australian Tour to Europe ====
The 1996 Australia rugby union tour in Europe was Campese's final rugby tour before his retirement from international Test rugby. While the tour contained Tests against Italy, Scotland, Ireland and Wales, Campese only played against Italy and Wales.

- Australia 40 – Italy 18 (23 October 1996)

Australia's first Test of the 1996 Tour to Europe against Italy marked Campese's 100th international Test. He became the second person, after French centre Philippe Sella, to achieve the milestone. The Test took place in Padova, where Campese had played rugby in Italy for three years from 1984 to 1986. The Test took place close to his father's birthplace, Vicenza.

Australia's Tim Horan was moved to the wing for the Test against Italy and scored a try. Campese then missed national selection for the next Test against Scotland, with coach Greg Smith opting to continue to play Tim Horan on the wing and play Joe Roff in Campese's place. This marked only the third time in Campese's 101-Test career that he was dropped from the Australian rugby team.

Campese also did not achieve national selection for the Test against Ireland. Australian coach Greg Smith opted to return Tim Horan to the inside centre position and play Jason Little on the wing in Campese's place.

He played in a midweek match against Munster and following this performance was selected for Australia's final Test of the 1996 Australia rugby union tour.

- Australia 28 – Wales 19 (Cardiff – 1 December 1996)

Campese was recalled to the Australian side for their final Test of the 1996 European tour, his 101st Test and his final Test appearance playing for the Wallabies. Australian coach Greg Smith returned Jason Little to the outside centre position and situated Campese on the right wing while Joe Roff occupied the left wing.

- Australia 39 – Barbarians 12 (Twickenham – 7 December 1996)

Campese played his last match for Australia against the Barbarians at Twickenham. Prior to the match Campese was offered the special privilege of playing for the Barbarians in his final match. However, Australian team management rejected the idea. Following the game, Campese completed a lap of honour and was afforded a standing ovation from crowd, to bring an end to his international career.

== Rugby Sevens ==
Campese is one of the most decorated rugby sevens players in history. Former Australian rugby player and sevens coach Michael O'Connor put him in his 'Best Ever Aussie Sevens team'.

=== Hong Kong Sevens ===
Campese made 12 appearances at the Hong Kong Sevens (1983–1990, 1993–94, 1997–98), during which he played in three victorious Australian campaigns (1983, 1985 and 1988), winning the Leslie Williams Award for Player of the Tournament in 1988. In 2015, the Hong Kong Rugby Football Union (HKRFU) listed Campese as the fifth member of 'The Hong Kong Magnificent Seven', the HKRFU's commemorative campaign to recognise the seven most formative players to have played in the past 40 years of Sevens in Hong Kong. Campese was honoured alongside Jonah Lomu, Waisale Serevi, Eric Rush, Christian Cullen, Ben Gollings and Zhang Zhiqiang.

Campese debuted for the Australian Sevens team at the 1983 Hong Kong Sevens, which they won.

In 1984, Campese returned to his second Hong Kong Sevens tournament with the Australian Sevens team. In 1985 Campese won his second Hong Kong Sevens tournament – Australia's third tournament victory overall – in a 24–10 victory over Public School Wanderers.

In late 1985, Campese was embroiled in controversy when he, Glen Ella and Roger Gould decided to participate in a sevens tournament in South Africa. At the time, international sports people were asked to support opposition to South Africa's apartheid regime by boycotting tour there. Campese's move drew criticism from Australian Prime Minister Bob Hawke.

In 1986, Australia made it to the semi-finals of the Hong Kong Sevens, but were defeated by the French Barbarians 20–14, who went on to lose the final to New Zealand 32–12. In May 1986, Campese played for the Australian sevens team at the Sport Aid Sevens tournament at Cardiff. Australia defeated Ireland before going on to lose to England.

In 1987, Campese captained the Australian side for the first time at the Hong Kong Sevens with Alan Jones as coach. Following the Hong Kong Sevens, Campese participated in the NSW Sevens at Concord Oval.

In 1988, Campese embarked on perhaps his most successful campaign at the Hong Kong Sevens, winning his third and final Hong Kong Sevens tournament with the Australian side, and being awarded the Leslie Williams Award for Player of the Tournament.

In 1989 Australia made it to the final of the Hong Kong Sevens, but were defeated in the final by New Zealand, 10–22.

Campese made his ninth appearance at the Hong Kong Sevens in 1993 where Australia were defeated by Fiji in the semi-final 14–17. Campese was forced to leave the match shortly after the match started, due to injury.

In 1994, Campese captained Australia for the Hong Kong Sevens, the team losing the final to New Zealand 32–20.

Campese returned to Hong Kong three years later for the 1997 Rugby World Cup Sevens.

=== Melrose Sevens ===
Campese participated in the 1990 Melrose Sevens in Scotland playing for Randwick, after the Melrose Rugby Club accorded Randwick Rugby Club the honour of an invitation to its one hundredth Melrose Sevens. Twenty clubs took part, and Randwick were one of four guest teams, including Racing Club of Paris, Harlequins and London Scottish from outside of Scotland. Campese was Randwick's top points scorer with 44 of its 92 points. He was praised for giving "one of the most dominant performances in tournament history." Randwick defeated Kelso in the final 28–6 in front of 20,000 spectators.

=== Rugby World Cup Sevens ===
Campese competed at the inaugural 1993 Rugby World Cup Sevens tournament. Australia defeated Taiwan in their opening match 28–8, before losing to Tonga 7–10 in their second game, in a surprise upset.

=== Paris Sevens and 1998 Commonwealth Games ===
In 1998 Mark Ella replaced Jeff Miller as coach of the Australian Sevens Team. After New South Wales Waratahs coach Matt Williams explained to Campese that he wanted to use him as an 'impact' player coming off the bench more often during the 1998 Super 12 season, the ARU approached Campese about acting as an ambassador for the rugby union code trying to raise to game's profile throughout Australia. The ARU also wanted Campese to take a more active role in Rugby Sevens, participating in the IRB World Series Sevens circuit leading up to the 1998 Commonwealth Games to be held in Malaysia. The Australian team toured Uruguay, Argentina, France, Hong Kong, Fiji and Jerusalem.

Prior to the 1998 Commonwealth Games the Australian Sevens team visited Israel for the "Holy Sevens", dubbed "The Holiest Sevens Tournament in the World".

The 1998 Commonwealth Games were Campese's final game of rugby sevens for Australia. Prior to the team's third-place play-off, Campese asked coach Mark Ella to select the younger players ahead of him. Campese ran onto the field in the final minutes to convert a Brendan Williams try.

== Rugby League offers ==
It was reported many times that he (Campese) was on the verge of switching to Rugby League, and the entire Rugby world should be grateful this did not happen.

– Bob Dwyer, 'Campese', The Winning Way (1992), 71.

Shortly following Campese's international rugby debut on the 1982 Australian tour to New Zealand, several rugby league clubs made offers to him to switch rugby codes. The Canberra Raiders, Manly-Warringah, Canterbury Bulldogs, and the Gold Coast (when they first joined the league), are all reputed to have made offers to Campese to join their club.

In 1983 the Parramatta Eels contacted Campese about playing rugby league for their club. Parramatta won the premiership the last two consecutive years, and won it again in 1983. The side contained players such as Peter Sterling, Brett Kenny, Mick Cronin, Eric Grothe and Steve Ella. The club's chief executive Denis Fitzgerald contacted Campese and made him an offer, however he rejected the team's proposal.

During the Wallabies' 1988 Australia rugby union tour of England, Scotland and Italy, Campese was contacted by St Helens prior to Australia's 12th match on tour against Combined Services about playing for their club. St Helens reportedly asked Michael O'Connor to recommend a player to join the club, and he nominated Campese. St Helens are reported to have offered Campese a deal between £300,000 and £350,000 (then estimated to be between $660,000 AUD and $770,000 AUD) over a three-year period, dependent upon a few variables such as number of appearances. Campese rejected the deal within a few minutes.

Following the Wallabies' final match of the U.K. leg of their tour, Campese travelled to Italy where St Helens made more overtures towards him, which were declined. St Helens continued to contact Campese about playing rugby league when he returned to Australia, however he continued to reject their offers. On 15 July 1989, the night of the third Test between the Wallabies and the British Lions, St Helens made another offer to Campese. When he declined their proposal, St Helens offered him another £10,000 ($21,000 AUD), but for the last time he rejected their request to play of their club.

== Legacy and honours ==
Campese has been cited by several rugby pundits as one of the greatest rugby union players of all time

- 1989 – selected in the Rothmans Rugby Union Yearbook "Team of the Decade" at left-wing The team was chosen by a panel consisting of former rugby players Gareth Edwards, Jean-Pierre Rives, Ian Robertson, and David Kirk. The panel agreed that Campese's selection was straightforward.
- 1997 – inducted into the Sport Australia Hall of Fame
- 1999 – Australia Post celebrated the centenary of Australian federation emitting 250 collectible stamps depicting the Campese with his autograph
- 2000 – received an Australian Sports Medal
- 2001 – received a Centenary Medal
- 2001 – Bill McLaren's all-time World XV included Campese on the left-wing. He nominated Campese his favourite player, rugby union's best entertainer, and the greatest rugby union player of all time.
- 2002 – made a Member of the Order of Australia
- 2004 – former Australian rugby union coach Bob Dwyer selected his best World XV from 1982 to 2003, including Campese on the left wing.
- 2007 – ranked the third best rugby union player of all-time by former England captain Will Carling
- 2007 – honoured in the third set of inductees into the Australian Rugby Union Hall of Fame
- 2013 – inducted into the IRB Hall of Fame
- 2013 – Inside Rugby magazine named its four Australian Invincibles – a rugby union equivalent of rugby league's Immortals. Campese was named alongside Col Windon, Ken Catchpole, and Mark Ella as the first Invincibles of Australian rugby union.
