= Michael Lynagh =

Australian rugby union player (born 1963)

Michael Lynagh AM
- Full name: Michael Patrick Thomas Lynagh
- Born: 25 October 1963 (age 63) Brisbane, Queensland, Australia
- Height: 178 cm (5 ft 10 in)
- Weight: 176 lb (80 kg)
- School: St Joseph's College, Gregory Terrace
- University: University of Queensland

Rugby union career
- Position: Fly-half
Senior career
| Years | Team | Apps | (Points) |
| 1991–1996 | Benetton Treviso | | |
| 1996–1998 | Saracens | 19 | (279) |
Super Rugby
| Years | Team | Apps | (Points) |
| 1982–1995 | Queensland | 100 | (1,166) |
International career
| Years | Team | Apps | (Points) |
| 1984–1995 | Australia | 72 | (911) |
| 1989 | ANZAC XV | 1 | (11) |
National sevens team
| Years | Team | | Comps |
| 1988–1993 | Australia | | |

Michael Patrick Thomas Lynagh, AM (born 25 October 1963) is an Australian former rugby union player who played 66 tests at fly-half and six tests at inside centre between 1984 and 1995. Lynagh was capped 72 times for Australia, and was captain from 1993 to 1995.

Lynagh debuted for the Australia national team (the Wallabies) at inside centre on the 1984 tour of Fiji. He was a member of the Wallabies team on the 1984 tour of the British Isles, the first and only Australian team to complete a touring Grand Slam. Lynagh scored 21 points against Scotland on this tour, which was a then Australian record against a top tier IRB rugby nation. In 1986, Lynagh scored 23 points for Australia playing against France, breaking the then Australian record for most points scored by an Australian player in a test. Lynagh was a member of the Australian squad for the 1986 Australia tour of New Zealand, during which the Wallabies became only the second team – and sixth international side – to win a test series victory against the All Blacks in New Zealand. During the 1987 Rugby World Cup, Lynagh broke the Australian record for most career points scored in the semi-final against France.

Lynagh was vice-captain when Australia won the 1991 World Cup. On the 1993 Australia rugby union tour, he produced his finest test performance for the Wallabies at Parc de Princes in the second test against France. He retired from international rugby after the 1995 Rugby World Cup. He was the world points scoring record holder when he retired, with 911 points.

== Family history and early years ==
Michael Patrick Thomas Lynagh was born on 25 October 1963 at Brisbane's Mater Hospital to Marie (née Johnson) and Ian Lynagh. He has one sibling, a sister named Jane who was born in April 1965. In 1963, Ian Lynagh started a teaching job at Villanova College while studying for his Bachelor of Education degree at the University of Queensland. The Lynagh family moved into their first house in the northern Brisbane suburb of Everton Park. They later moved to Ipswich where Michael Lynagh attended St Mary's Primary School for a year. In 1969, Ian Lynagh left the teaching profession to enter into the field of guidance counseling at schools, prompting the Lynagh family to move to the Gold Coast where Michael Lynagh attended Star of the Sea convent in Southport for three years. Lynagh then spent his fifth grade year at Southport. During this time his father Ian changed jobs and became a student counselor at the Queensland Institute of Technology. In 1973 the Lynagh family moved back to Brisbane, settling in the suburb of Ascot in Carfin Street.

== St Joseph's College, Gregory Terrace ==
Early in 1974, Michael Lynagh commenced studies at St Joseph's College, Gregory Terrace, which his biographer Andrew Slack called "one of the most important and valuable journeys of his life."

In 1978, Lynagh's father Ian was offered the opportunity to undertake doctoral studies in psychology at Oregon State University, leading the Lynagh family to move to the United States. The family settled in Corvallis, Oregon, on America's north-west coast in August 1978. Lynagh attended Crescent Valley High School for half a year where he played American football as a kicker. In early 1979, Lynagh returned to Australia with his mother and sister while his father remained in Oregon to complete his doctoral studies.

Upon returning from the United States, Lynagh made selection for St Joseph's College, Gregory Terrace's rugby union First XV at 15-years-old as a fly-half. St Joseph's College, Gregory Terrace won the GPS competition in 1979 – its third successive championship. Shortly thereafter Lynagh was selected as captain for a Queensland under-16 team to play at a carnival in Perth. Queensland finished third in the tournament.

Follow this, Lynagh was named captain of an Australian under-17 team that toured New Zealand in May 1979. The team was coached by Jeff Sayle and contained future Wallabies Brett Papworth, Greg Martin and Cameron Lillicrap. The team won all five matches, including a 39–14 victory over Wellington and a 26–15 win against New Zealand at Christchurch. In The Winning Way, Bob Dwyer remembered: "I regard Lynagh as one of the great players of international Rugby for at least a generation. I first saw him on Coogee Oval when he was practicing for, I think, the Australian under-17 team. I asked the coach Jeff Sayle: 'Who's that little blond-haired kid over there?' Sayle replied, 'Don't knock him – he's the star.' I assured Sayle I was not knocking him. I was immediately impressed by him."

Upon returning from New Zealand, Lynagh continued playing for St Joseph's College, Gregory Terrace, and the school won its fourth consecutive premiership in 1980 with a 12–0 win over Brisbane State High School. In 1981, Lynagh was named captain of the school's cricket and rugby union teams. While St Joseph's College, Gregory Terrace's cricket team did not win the premiership, the rugby union side won its fifth consecutive premiership. In the sixth game of the season against Southport School, Lynagh's collarbone was broken in a tackle made by future Australian rugby league player Peter Jackson, forcing him to miss the last three weeks of the rugby season.

Lynagh's injury healed in time for him to attend the trials in Sydney for the Australian Schoolboys team and he obtained selection for the 1981 tour to Great Britain. Lynagh toured with the 1981 Australian Schoolboys managed by Martin Pitt and captained by Steve Tuynman. The side went undefeated for the 10-game tour, which included victories over Irish Schools (24–0), Scottish Schools (34–0), and Wales (13–9).

== Queensland University ==
Upon returning from the 1981 Australian Schoolboys tour to Great Britain, Lynagh was scouted by two Brisbane rugby clubs: Brothers Old Boys and University of Queensland. He committed to studying Human Movement at the University of Queensland, and following a meeting with University of Queensland's captain Mark Loane, he decided to play for the club. Lynagh debuted for University of Queensland on 7 March 1982 against Souths Rugby Club, opposing Andrew Slack who was playing at five-eighth for his club. Slack, who kept a diary of all his rugby performances, later wrote: '...Went out to St Lucia and played University in absolutely atrocious conditions. They beat us 17–0; Michael Lynagh made a superb debut.' Loane later praised Lynagh's performance, 'It was the most impressive first-grade debut I've ever seen.' University of Queensland's 17 points came from two tries scored by Loane and nine points from Lynagh's kicking. Lynagh spent much of 1982 absent from University of Queensland Rugby Club while representing and touring with the Queensland Reds, however he returned to club rugby for University of Queensland's semi-finals.

In January 1983, Lynagh toured with University of Queensland to the British Isles, where his team played mostly against other universities or district teams. Later in the year, University of Queensland lost the grand final to Brothers Old Boys 30–15.

In 1984, University of Queensland coach Lester Hampton announced Lynagh as the team's new captain in what was Lynagh's third season with the club. Under his captaincy, University of Queensland won their first match of the season 35–3, which was a rematch of the previous year's premiership against Brothers Old Boys.

In 1985, Lynagh led University of Queensland to a berth in the Brisbane grand final against Wests. University of Queensland hadn't won a premiership for six years and entered the final narrow favourites. However, Wests defeated University of Queensland 10–7 after the referee Kerry Fitzgerald awarded a field goal to Wests' fly-half Tim Lane, which a television replay later confirmed had gone under the crossbar.

In 1988, Lynagh won the first of three straight Brisbane club premierships with University of Queensland, defeating Souths 18–10 in the grand final.

In 1989, University of Queensland beat Souths 34–9 in the grand final, in which Lynagh scored a try and kicked two drop goals, one from 50 metres. In Noddy (1995), Andrew Slack praised Lynagh, writing that, 'It was an ideal climax to a domestic season in which Lynagh had displayed the best form of his career.'

In 1990, University of Queensland beat Brothers Old Boys 17–10 in the grand final, in which he scored two tries. Following the match, Brothers Old Boys lock Rod McCall said: "If Michael Lynagh hadn't played, Uni might not have scored a point."

== Queensland ==
Following the Wallabies' 1981–82 tour of Britain and Ireland, Queensland full-back Roger Gould decided to travel to Argentina, leaving his position vacant within the state side. To compensate for Gould's absence, Queensland's selectors named its incumbent five-eighth Paul McLean at full-back and Lynagh at fly-half. Lynagh's first game for Queensland was a 32–9 victory over Wairarapa-Bush. In his second game for Queensland, Lynagh played against Sydney and opposed Mark Ella at five-eighth. Queensland lost to Sydney 25–9. His third game for Queensland was scheduled on Anzac Day 1982 against an invitational New Zealand XV that his biography describes as 'an All Black team in all but name.' Queensland lost to the invitational New Zealand side. Shortly thereafter, Gould returned from Argentina to play for Queensland and McLean was returned to the five-eighth position. However, Lynagh was selected for a 21-man Queensland squad for a three-match tour of New Zealand in 1982. Lynagh played in his fourth game for Queensland in a mid-week game against Hawkes Bay in Napier, which was the only game Queensland won on tour. Notably, in the first four games that Michael Lynagh played for Queensland in 1982, he partnered three different half-backs – Tony Parker, Guy Sanders and Mick Arnold.

Despite Queenslander Tim Lane being selected ahead of Lynagh for the 1982 tour of New Zealand, following the retirement of McLean from national and state representative rugby, Lynagh commenced 1983 as the Queensland Maroons' first selection at five-eighth. Lynagh toured with Queensland to Fiji and New Zealand and played with two new half-backs, debutants Peter Lavin and Paul Johnston.

Queensland lost their first game against Fiji in Suva, 24–48. However, they won the second match on tour 26–0 against Western Province in Nadi. In New Zealand, Queensland lost to Counties in Pukekohe in what Andrew Slack described as a 'sound beating'. Queensland's 1983 season contained a victory over New South Wales at Ballymore, a 7–6 loss in a rematch at the Sydney Cricket Ground, and a victory over Canterbury.

During the 1983 Argentina tour of Australia, Lynagh played for Queensland in the Pumas' third game on tour, which the Maroons lost 28–34. However, while playing against Argentina fly-half Hugo Porta, Lynagh contributed 22 points to Queensland's 28 points, including a try, two conversions and four penalties.

In April 1984, Lynagh toured with Queensland for a three-match tour of New Zealand, during which his father Ian accompanied the team in his new profession as sports psychologist. Queensland won the first tour game 31–12 against North Auckland at Whangerei.

In 1986 on New Year's Day, Lynagh departed with the Queensland team for a one-month tour of Europe. Queensland defeated the Netherlands 54–5 in the first match on tour in Amsterdam. Queensland faced Ulster during the tour in a game that was played in what Andrew Slack called 'the worst conditions imaginable.' Queensland won 6–4 against an Ulster side that had been undefeated in their previous 17 matches, with Lynagh kicking two penalties. Lynagh considers his second goal as one of the most memorable of his career:

We were awarded a penalty fifteen metres out from the line and just to the right of the posts. In normal circumstances a very straightforward kick… I took my normal walk back and then came in and hit it absolutely as hard as I could. It went through the posts and the touch judges' flags went up. However by this time the wind had got hold of the ball and it came back around the goalpost and landed parallel to me and thirty metres to the left!

Queensland captain Andrew Slack later recorded in his diary that: 'We won the game 6–4 in by far the worst conditions I have experienced – I even wore gloves. Slatts and Noddy though were superb.'

During the 1986 France tour to the Southern Hemisphere, Queensland faced France in the lead-up to the tourists' single test against the Wallabies on tour. France defeated Queensland 48–9.

In 1988, Queensland lost their first interstate series in 13 years.

In 1989, John Connolly was instated as Queensland coach following Bob Templeton's retirement in 1988. Among Connolly's first actions as new coach of Queensland was to take the captaincy away from Lynagh and give it to lock Bill Campbell. In Noddy: The Authorised Biography of Michael Lynagh, Connolly explained his rationale behind his decision: '...it was the best thing to do. I needed the forwards to be led in a particular way if we were going to win the ball, and Bill was the man to do it. Noddy had enough to worry about and I felt it would be best for the team and for him if he didn't have to worry about captaincy.'

In March 1989, the newly dubbed Queensland Reds sent a squad of 27 players for an eight-game pre-season tour of Argentina. Queensland's first tour game was against Mar del Plata. Lynagh's second game for Queensland on tour was against Mendoza (won 49–24), at the foot of the Andes, in which Jason Little made his representative state debut.

== Australian under-21s ==
Lynagh was a member of the Australia under-21 side who played the New Zealand Colts in a curtain-raiser to the Wallabies' second test against Scotland in 1982. The match contained a standout performance from the Australia under-21 full-back David Campese that catapulted him into the Australia national team within weeks.

Lynagh came into national selection considerations following the 1982 Australia tour of New Zealand. 10 Australian players (nine of them from Queensland) made themselves unavailable for the tour, and two of Lynagh's Australian under-21 teammates were selected – David Campese and Steve Tuynman. Australian coach Bob Dwyer and the chairman of selectors John Bain reportedly wanted to select Lynagh, however then-Queensland coach and Wallaby co-selector Bob Templeton talked them out of it, suggesting they would be rushing Lynagh's development as a rugby player too soon.

== Australia ==
=== 1983 Australia rugby union tour of Italy and France ===
In 1983, following a match Lynagh played for Queensland against Argentina (lost 28–34), in which he contributed 22 points (including a try, two conversions, and four penalties), he obtained selection for the Australian team for their upcoming two-match series against the Pumas. Lynagh remained a substitute during the series, which was tied 1–1.

Shortly thereafter, Lynagh was selected for the 1983 Australia tour of Europe. He debuted for the Wallabies in their first match on tour against Italy A, won 26–0, in which he contributed a field goal, a penalty and two conversions for a total of 10 points. He then played in the Wallabies' fourth match on tour against French Police XV in Le Creusot, which was drawn 15-15. Andrew Slack in Noddy: The Authorised Biography of Michael Lynagh documented the final moments of the game:

Lynagh had kicked three penalties before a sideline conversion of Duncan Hall's try leveled the scores at 15-all. With just moments to go Lynagh received a perfect pass from half-back Dominic Vaughan and, as he'd done so often for teams in the past, slotted the field goal. As the ball soared through the posts, he began to head back to halfway for the anticipated re-start of play. However the congratulations of his team-mates were cut short when the referee, who obviously followed the logic he had to live in the town, signaled no goal. I was standing beside the referee at the time and the flight of the ball could not have been mistaken. Welcome to France.

Leading up to Australia's first test against France, press speculation considered the possibility that Lynagh could make his test debut at inside centre, replacing Michael Hawker who was suffering from injury during the tour. However, in the Wallabies' final provincial game before the first test, played against a French Selection XV at Agen, Lynagh broke his collarbone in four places in the first minute of the game, ending his playing responsibilities for the tour. In For Love Not Money, Simon Poidevin documented that:

The players in this French selection (the fourth of these teams, in which their national selectors simply parade all their likely Test talent) were the toughest-mob you've ever seen. All their noses were bent and twisted. And while they gave the Wallabies a 36–6 hiding, looks deceive because it was a clean game. Nevertheless, two of these tough characters picked Michael Lynagh up during the game and drove him into the turf so hard that he broke his collarbone and was finished for the tour. It was a big blow to the team, as he was playing extremely well and consistently kicking goals.

In Noddy: The Authorised Biography of Michael Lynagh, Lynagh documented that at the end of the 1983 Australia tour, Mark Ella confided to him that he had plans to retire from international rugby following the 1984 tour of the British Isles, which would give Lynagh a chance to succeed him as Australian fly-half.

=== 1984 Australia rugby union tour of Fiji ===
In 1984, Lynagh toured with the Wallabies on the 1984 tour of Fiji. Simon Poidevin in For Love Not Money documented that "Lynagh had been the dominant player there in [the] domestic matches". Australia's incumbent inside-centre Michael Hawker was unavailable for the first test against Fiji because it coincided with his wedding, which allowed Michael Lynagh to make his test debut for Australia at National Stadium in Suva against Fiji at inside centre. The Wallabies defeated Fiji 16–3 in rainy conditions. Lynagh would later reflect that, "I just recall how terrible it was. I hardly touched the ball because of the conditions."

Following the 1984 tour of Fiji, Lynagh was dropped from the Australian team for the 1984 Bledisloe Cup series against New Zealand (the All Blacks). In For Love Not Money, Simon Poidevin wrote: 'The only surprise was Lynagh's absence, given the good season he'd been having at home, his form in Fiji, and the fact that it left us light in the goalkicking department. However, with the series level at 1–1 and with one test remaining to be played, following Queensland's 39–12 loss to the All Blacks in a domestic match, Lynagh was approached by Australian coach Alan Jones and asked to play for the Wallabies. The first two test of the 1984 Bledisloe Cup series had been characterised by a large number of penalties being awarded by the referee; thus, Jones wanted Lynagh to play for the Wallabies at full-back, so he could keep Mark Ella at five-eighth and use Lynagh as the team's goal-kicker. Lynagh rejected Jones' offer. In Noddy: The Authorised Biography of Michael Lynagh, Lynagh is quoted saying, "I'd never played full-back before and I was scared I'd let the side down." He further stated: "If I went and played a shocker, and missed all the goals, how long would it have taken me to recover, and would I ever get a chance again? It might have been different if it had been the first test and not the third." In For Love Not Money, Simon Poidevin recorded that: 'Behind the scenes many things were happening: the most intriguing was Alan Jones' request that Michael Lynagh play full-back. Lynagh was one of the form players at that time and a magnificent goal kicker. It is a tragedy that he declined the offer because he felt he wouldn't succeed in this highly demanding role."

With Lynagh unwilling to play for Australia in a position he had never played before, Wallaby coach Alan Jones opted to have Mark Ella and Roger Gould share the goal-kicking responsibilities in the third Bledisloe Cup test of 1984. The Irish referee Dave Burnett awarded 26 penalties during the game, 19 to Australia and seven to New Zealand. Mark Ella kicked five penalties from six attempts, but Roger Gould missed two simple kicks at goal. Campese took over from Gould during the game and kicked one goal from two attempts. The Wallabies lost the test to the All Blacks by one point, 25–24.

=== 1984 Grand Slam ===
Lynagh toured with the Eighth Wallabies for the 1984 tour of the British Isles, on which they won a "Grand Slam", the first Australian side to defeat all four home nations, England, Ireland, Wales and Scotland, on a tour. Lynagh and Tom Lawton made the most appearances for the Wallabies on tour, representing the side in 11 of the 18 tour games.

Lynagh was not initially selected for Australia's first provincial game against London Division at Twickenham Stadium. However, Australian centres, captain Andrew Slack and Michael Hawker, were both injured and unavailable to play in the Wallabies' opening match. Moreover, utility player James Black, who was set to play in the centres, had to withdraw on the morning of the game with an injury. Following the unavailability of these players, Lynagh was selected at inside centre, outside five-eighth Mark Ella with Matt Burke at outside centre. Lynagh kicked four goals from seven attempts in the game, which included two penalties and two conversions. Terry Cooper in Victorious Wallabies reported that, 'In a low-key first half, Lynagh got the tour away to a secure start with two penalties. He was on target with his second and third shots from 40 and 30 metres, adjusting rapidly to Twickenham's long grass, made more testing by the rain. His fourth kick hit the post.' Lynagh kicked his first conversion after Mark Ella scored the first try on tour in the 52nd minute. Lynagh kicked his second conversion after Nick Farr-Jones scored Australia's second try of the game.

Lynagh was selected at fly-half for Australia's second tour match against South and South West Division at Exeter. Lynagh kicked four penalty goals from seven attempts and scored all of the Wallabies' points in a 12-all draw. Terry Cooper in Victorious Wallabies documented that: '...Lynagh had failed with two early penalties. The gale had faded to a stiff breeze and the rain had vanished, but Lynagh was kicking into the breeze and he topped a shot from 30 metres and then hooked one from 40 metres.' However, after Australia trailed South and South West Division 0–12 at halftime, Lynagh would kick four second-half penalties to level the score:

Australia emulated South West's tactics at the start of the second half, kicking the ball down wind and forcing the defenders to catch it with the added hazard of the setting sun in their eyes. When David Trick failed to catch the ball, he compounded his error by being caught offside and Lynagh began eroding the 12–0 lead with a close-range penalty in the 45th minute. Running and handling began to feature less than ever in this game and the afternoon developed into a shoot-out between Lynagh and Barnes, with the odds always on Lynagh. He clubbed a penalty from halfway just outside a post, but made it 12-6 with a wide-angled penalty on the hour. After Barnes had hooked a straight penalty, Lynagh reduced the gap to three points with a kick from 25 metres. Four minutes from time he needed his nerves as much as his kicking skill when Australia were given another penalty far out on the left. His nerves and skill were up to the task and the scores were finally level.

Lynagh's opposite fly-half Stuart Barnes had an opportunity to win the game deep into injury time, however he narrowly missed a penalty goal that would have won South and South West Division the game. Andrew Slack would later reflect that 'Lynagh was one of the few Australians to play well'.

Lynagh was not originally selected for the Wallabies' third tour match against Cardiff. However, he came on as a replacement during the game, which was lost 16–12.

Lynagh was selected at inside centre in his fourth consecutive tour match for Australia against Combined Services at Aldershot, in which he scored a try and kicked six out of eight conversions attempts, for a personal tally of 16 points in a 44–9 victory. After failing to convert the first try of the game scored by Andrew Slack, Lynagh converted Australia's second try, scored by David Campese in the seventh minute. Later in the game he converted tries scored by Peter Grigg and Bill Campbell. He then converted Andrew Slack's second try, and Campese's second and third tries. Lynagh finished the game by scoring Australia's eight try, which he did not convert.

Lynagh was rested for the Wallabies' fifth and final provincial game before their first test against England, a 17–7 victory over Swansea – a game which had to be abandoned with little more than 10 minutes remaining in the match, due to floodlight failure. Lynagh's absence in the game, and the Wallabies' incumbent Michael Hawker's selection at five-eighth, gave an indication that Lynagh would replace him for the upcoming first test against England.

Michael Lynagh was selected at inside centre for the first test against England, replacing Michael Hawker and playing outside Mark Ella. Andrew Slack documented in Noddy: The Authorised Biography of Michael Lynagh that: 'It was the game Lynagh terms his real test debut. Fiji was fine, but this was fair dinkum.' With a half-time score of 3–3, Australia scored three second-half tries, scored by Mark Ella, Michael Lynagh, and Simon Poidevin to win the match 19–3.

Following the test, in an article published on 4 November, Sunday Times rugby correspondent Stephen Jones recorded: "His try sealed a remarkable afternoon for Lynagh. He had been brought in to kick goals but proceeded to fire almost every kick wide of the posts. At the same time he provided the rich compensation of an authoritative performance in the centre."

Lynagh was rested, along with the rest of the first-strong Australian side, for Wallabies' only provincial game between the first test against England and second test against Ireland, won 21–18.

Lynagh returned to the Australian test side for its second test on tour against Ireland at Lansdowne Road, won 16–9. He missed a penalty kick in the early stages of the match after Ireland were penalised for obstruction. However, he would later open the scoring of the match in the 19th minute with a 40-metre drop goal. Shortly thereafter he missed a penalty in the minutes leading up to the interval, to keep the score 3–0 at halftime.

Lynagh hooked the conversion attempt and shortly thereafter a long-range penalty, before kicking a penalty goal in the final minute of play to make the final score of the game 16–9. In total, Lynagh kicked one goal from five attempts.

Lynagh was selected for the Wallabies' next tour game at fly-half, a 15–13 loss to Ulster in which he kicked two goals from seven attempts. Lynagh missed two long-range penalties, from 40 and 45 metres, in the opening minutes of the match, before Ulster's fly-half Ian Brown kicked a short-range penalty in the 8th minute. Full-back Philip Rainey then kicked a 40-metre drop goal to give Ulster a 6–0 lead. Lynagh responded with a penalty goal in the 19th minute, before missing another shot at goal in the second quarter of the match. In the second half, Lynagh converted a Peter Grigg try in the 51st minute (the second of Grigg's tries in the match), to give the Wallabies a 13–6 lead. However, Ian Brown responded with penalty kicks in the 56th and 58th minutes to make the score 13–12.In the final 10 minutes of the game, David Campese was penalised, and full-back Philip Rainey kicked a 50-metre penalty goal to give Ulster a 15–13 lead. The Wallabies were unable to score in the final eight minutes of the game, and lost 15–13.

Lynagh was then rested for the Wallabies' 10th match on tour, a 19–31 loss to Munster, and the 11th tour game, a 19–16 loss to Llanelli.

Prior to the Wallabies' third test on tour against Wales, Australian coach Alan Jones decided to remove the goal-kicking responsibilities from Michael Lynagh, and give them to Roger Gould for the game. Australia defeated Wales 28–9, in which Lynagh scored a try – his second in three tests – and Gould kicked five goals from seven attempts.

Terry Cooper recorded in Victorious Wallabies (1985) how Lynagh scored his try against Wales: "Australia's second try also came from a blind-side break. Farr-Jones again escaped after a scrum and he gave Campese room to move. The winger took off on a spectacular diagonal run towards the Welsh goal. His speed and unexpected direction created a massive overlap. The Welsh suddenly looked as though they had only ten players in action and all Australia had to do was to transfer the ball carefully. They did so. Campese to Poidevin and then on to Lynagh, who scored between the posts."

In Wallaby Gold: The History of Australian Test Rugby, Peter Jenkins also depicted Lynagh's try: "Farr-Jones helped create another try by using the short side. Campese made a superb run, Poidevin backed up and Lynagh touched down." Terry Smith in Path to Victory (1987) documented that: "Lynagh's second try came after Farr-Jones again escaped up the blind side from a scrum to set up a dazzling break by David Campese. Simon Poidevin's backing up didn't happen by accident either. He always tries to trail Campese on the inside."

Following the Wallabies' test victory over Wales, Lynagh played in the 14th match on tour, a 9–6 loss to South of Scotland. Following his success against Wales, Gould was assigned the goal-kicking duties for this game. However, he kicked one goal from five attempts. Lynagh had one penalty goal before half-time, which he missed. Following the game, Australian coach Alan Jones said: "We should have taken the penalty chances in the first half."

In For Love Not Money (1990), Simon Poidevin documented that:

The only thing worrying Jonesy [Alan Jones] in terms of personnel was who to make Australia's goalkicker. Michael Lynagh's kicking had gone off early in the tour and he kicked only four from fourteen attempts against England and Ireland. Roger Gould had taken over against Wales and landed five out of seven. But in the last training run we had, Lynagh slotted fifteen out of sixteen in swirling wind. Jonesy also knew that he'd been making a fair number of calls home to Brisbane, where his dad's a sports psychologist, and this had obviously been beneficial in getting him on the fails mentally. So the coach was faced with the gamble of calling Lynagh back for the greatest task he'd ever face or else sticking with Roger, who was a cool old head but technically not as good as Noddy. I know Jonesy spoke to my co-author on the test eve and sought his opinion. Jim suggested to use Lynagh, but not to inform him till the morning of the test. Jonesy did just that.

Lynagh played in Australia's final test of the 1984 Grand Slam tour, a 37–12 victory over Scotland, in which he scored 21 points from five penalty kicks and three conversions from four attempts.

=== 1985 ===
Lynagh commenced the 1985 international season with the Wallabies with a two-test series against Canada. The first test marked the first of 47 occasions that Lynagh and Nick Farr-Jones were Australia's halves combination. Australia defeated Canada 59–3 in the first test, in a game where Lynagh set a new Australian individual point scoring record in a test match of 23 points surpassing his own record of 21 points against Scotland in 1984, Paul McLean's 21 points in the Wallabies' first test against Japan in 1975, and his 21 points in Australia's second test against Scotland in 1982. Australia won the second test 43–15, in which Lynagh kicked five goals from 13 attempts. Lynagh contributed a drop goal, two penalty goals, and three conversions. Peter Jenkins in Wallaby Gold reported that: 'It took just 58 seconds for the Australians to trigger another landslide of points, with five-eighth Michael Lynagh kicking a booming field goal for 3-nil.'

=== 1985 Bledisloe Cup ===
Lynagh participated in the single Bledisloe Cup test of 1985 against New Zealand, which was lost 10–9. He played in the game with a broken finger, which he had sustained during a training session in the lead-up to the test. The Irish referee David Burnett awarded 25 penalties during the game. New Zealand's goal-kicker Allan Hewson kicked two goals from eight attempts, while Lynagh kicked two goals (a conversion and a penalty) from seven attempts contributing five points to the Wallabies' total of nine.

Following the single Bledisloe Cup test of 1985, Lynagh missed Australia's two-test series against Fiji, after deciding to undergo arthroscopic surgery to repair torn cartilage in his knees.

=== 1986 ===
In 1986, Lynagh travelled to the United Kingdom for one game as part of a two-match celebration commemorating the centenary of the International Rugby Board (IRB) featuring players from around the world. Lynagh was selected along with fellow Wallabies Andrew Slack, Simon Poidevin, Steve Cutler, Nick Farr-Jones, Tom Lawton, Roger Gould, Steve Tuynman, and Enrique Rodríguez for the two-match celebration.

Lynagh participated in the first match playing for a World XV (dubbed "The Rest") containing players from Australia, New Zealand, South Africa and France to be coached by Brian Lochore, that played against the British Lions, after the Lions' 1986 tour to South Africa had been cancelled. The World XV contained:

15. Serge Blanco (France), 14. John Kirwan (New Zealand), 13. Andrew Slack (Australia), 12. Michael Lynagh (Australia), 11. Patrick Estève (France), 10. Wayne Smith (New Zealand), 9. Nick Farr-Jones (Australia), 8. Murray Mexted (New Zealand), 7. Simon Poidevin (Australia), 6. Mark Shaw (New Zealand), 5. Burger Geldenhuys (South Africa), 4. Steve Cutler (Australia), 3. Gary Knight (New Zealand), 2. Tom Lawton (Australia), 1. Enrique Rodríguez (Australia).

The World XV won the match 15–7, in which all its points were scored by Australian players – Lynagh converting tries scored by Nick Farr-Jones and Simon Poidevin, and also contributing a penalty goal himself.

During the 1986 France tour, the Wallabies beat France 27–14, with Lynagh kicking a record 23 points.

=== 1986 Bledisloe Cup ===
Following Australia's domestic test in 1986 against Italy, France and Argentina, Lynagh toured with the Wallabies on the 1986 tour of New Zealand. The 1986 Wallabies became the second Australian rugby team to beat the All Blacks in New Zealand in a test series. They are one of six sides to win a test series in New Zealand, along with the 1937 South African Springboks, the 1949 Australian Wallabies, the 1971 British Lions, the 1994 French touring side and the 2022 Ireland tour to New Zealand.

Lynagh was rested for Australia's first game on tour – a 21–21 draw against Waikato in Hamilton. However, he returned to the Australian side for the second match against Manawatu in Palmerston North, in which he kicked three successful goals from eight attempts, including the match-winning penalty in the final minute to give the Wallabies a 9–6 victory. He was then rested for the Wallabies' third game on tour, a 18–6 victory against Wairarapa-Bush, before returning for Australia's fourth provincial game, a 21–3 victory against Counties, in which he scored a try, three conversions and a penalty goal. Terry Smith in Path to Victory (1987) reported that: "Midfield backs Michael Lynagh, Brett Papworth and Andrew Slack contributed no less than twenty-four first-up tackles. It was a reassuring showing with so many of the test players on deck." He was rested for the final game before the first test, with Australia defeating Wanganui 24–17.

Lynagh played in the Wallabies' first test on tour against the All Blacks in Wellington. Terry Smith in Path to Victory (1987) reported that: When the Wallabies went to Athletic Park on the Friday morning before the test to get a feel of the ground, the goalposts rocked back and forth in the freezing wind gusts. Wearing mittens to keep his hands warm in the Antarctic-like conditions, the goal-kicker Michael Lynagh said: 'With the big stands on each side, it's like a big wind tunnel.' The Wallabies won the first test 13–12, in which Lynagh kicked a conversion and a penalty, contributing five points to the win. Lynagh converted a try scored by David Campese in the 22nd minute, and kicked a penalty goal from 47 metres to give Australia a half-time lead of 9–0. The Wallabies held off a second-half comeback from the All Blacks to win the first test 13–12.

Following the first test, Australia coach Alan Jones decided that Lynagh would play in no matches until the second test against the All Blacks in Dunedin. Lynagh was then rested for the Wallabies next three provincial games – a 62–0 victory over Buller at Westport, a 30–10 loss to Canterbury in Christchurch, and a 33–11 win over South Canterbury in Timaru.

Lynagh returned to the Australia side for their second test against the All Blacks, which was lost 13–12 in controversial circumstances. Lynagh contributed three penalty goals and a drop goal; however, Australia were denied a chance of winning the test when number eight Steve Tuynman had a try ruled out, that if converted by Lynagh, would have won the Wallabies the test and the series. Following the second test loss to the All Blacks, Lynagh was quoted by Terry Smith in Path to Victory (1987) as saying, "I'm mad at myself for not taking the chances to do things in the test at Dunedin." He further said that: "I missed an easy kick at goal; a few bombs were a bit astray and I failed with that second field goal attempt. It was difficult, but I probably should have put the ball up a bit more."

After the Wallabies' second test defeat to the All Blacks, Jones selected Lynagh at full-back for Australia's next provincial match against Southland at Invercargill, and assigned him the Australian captaincy for the first time in his rugby career. The Wallabies defeated Southland 55–0, with Lynagh contributing eight conversions and one penalty goal. He was then rested for the Wallabies' next provincial match against Canterbury, lost 10–30.

In the lead-up to the Wallabies' third, final, and series-deciding test against the All Blacks at Eden Park in Auckland, Jones told the press that, "Michael Lynagh is facing his most formidable test ever." The Wallabies led the All Blacks 12–6 at half-time. In the 16th minute of the second half, New Zealand full-back Kieran Crowley kicked a penalty goal to make the score 12–9. Terry Smith in Path to Victory (1987) reported that: 'Then came the penalty goal by Lynagh which Jones later described as his most memorable moment of that tour. It was then he knew the Bledisloe Cup was on its way back to Australia.

"It was midway through the second half. A penalty to Australia and Jones presumed the Wallabies would kick for touch. 'But Slacky [Andrew Slack] looked at Michael and the little bloke says, "Oh give me a go at this". It wobbled around, terrible bloody kick, but it went over the bar and, to me, the All Blacks were gone.' If there was any doubt, Lynagh removed it with another penalty to bring up his 200th test point."

=== 1987 Rugby World Cup ===
Lynagh played in Australia's quarter-final match against Ireland, which the Wallabies won 33–15 after leading Ireland 24–0 at half-time. Lynagh received acclaim from Peter Jenkins, who wrote in Wallaby Gold that: 'But the best of the backs were Lynagh, his tactical kicking a weapon of control and his shooting for goal even more destructive to the Irish cause, and winger Matt Burke, who played one of his finest games in the gold jumper. Irishman Trevor Ringland had no answer and Burke finished with two tries. In The Winning Way (1992), Bob Dwyer praised Lynagh's tactical kicking in this game:

Jones employed a tactic of trying to force opposing teams under pressure into the corners of the field, from which they would often have trouble escaping. I thought this was one of his best strategies. It was not Jones' invention, of course, but it was a strategy he operated very successfully by making use of Michael Lynagh's kicking skills in particular. It proved to be of great advantage in Australia's match against Ireland in the 1987 World Cup. It was the key to a tremendous Australian onslaught in the first thirty minutes of that match. Previously, I had not chosen to use this tactic myself. It was not that I disagreed with it in principle; I have already made the point that there is nothing wrong with kicking to move defences around. I was simply preoccupied with other methods of attack. Since Jones' departure in 1988, however, it has remained part of the Australian armoury. When I see a need for it I simply have to say to Lynagh, 'Noddy, just put a few kicks down there like you did against Ireland in '87.'

However, Lynagh would go on to play in the semi-final which Australia lost 30–24 to France. Lynagh has described the 1987 semi-final, in which Australia faced France, as one of the greatest games of rugby union he ever played. In Noddy: The Authorised Biography of Michael Lynagh, Andrew Slack wrote that: "Lynagh rates the match one of the finest in which he has played and it was without doubt the highlight of the tournament". In Blindsided, Michael Lynagh wrote that: "Many people have described it as one of the greatest test matches ever played. Me? Even thought we lost, I would probably agree. It was such a great game of rugby. It was close, the lead changed constantly; you just never quite knew what was going to happen until that [Serge] Blanco try at the end."

Lynagh opened the scoring of the match in the fifth minute with a drop goal from outside France's quarter. In the eighth minute of play Australia was awarded a penalty after France lock Jean Condom was penlised for deliberately collapsing a maul (which injured Australia centre Brett Papworth), and Lynagh kicked the penalty goal in the ninth minute just outside France's quarter and on a slight angle. Lynagh increased Australia's lead in the 30th minute with another penalty goal, kicked from his own half, after Pierre Berbizier was penalised in the 29th minute for being in an offside position. Lynagh had the opportunity to give Australia a 12–0 half-time lead in the 39th minute after Jean Condom was penalised in the 38th minute for a ruck infringement; however, Lynagh missed the penalty which was taken just outside France's quarter and on a slight angle. France scored the first try of the match two minutes into injury time when Alain Lorieux ripped the ball from Troy Coker in a line-out, went down the blindside and scored a try. At half-time, Australia led France 9–6.

Four minutes into the second half, France centre Philippe Sella scored a try that was converted to give France the lead for the first time in the test. However, Lynagh responded almost immediately six minutes into the second half, after Sella's try, with a line-break that set-up David Campese to score his world-record 25th try in his international career. In Blindsided (2015) Lynagh narrated the events leading to Campese's try: 'My dummy to wrong-foot Franck Mesnel and a step inside Philippe Sella set up a break deep inside French territory. As he usually did, Campo showed up at the end of the move to score in the corner after Peter Grigg popped the ball inside to him.' However, other more reputable reports have Lynagh beating French scrum-half Pierre Berbizier, not Sella. Campese's world-record try set the stage for what Lynagh would later describe as one of the most surreal moments of his career:

Back in 1987, we were still using a few handfuls of loose sand as a platform for the ball, as plastic tees had yet to be invented. So the ball boy came onto the field with the little bucket of sand and it was part of my routine, as I was preparing my sand tee, to look up and say 'Thank you'. It was something I always did. I thought it was a nice thing to do. But as I was putting the ball down, I was aware of this ball boy – probably twelve years old – still standing there. I looked up at him as if to say, 'You shouldn't still be here.'

He didn't move.

'This is a pretty important kick, mate…'

I couldn't believe what I was hearing. It was a bizaree moment of personal interactions in the midst of a momentous occasion. But for a moment it was as if he and I were the only two left at Concord Oval.

'Thanks, I know.' I said. 'This is the semi-final of the World Cup.'

'Well, you better get it, he said, before trotting off.

I did get it and as I was running back for the restart, I glanced over and saw him standing on the touchline giving me the thumbs-up with a big smile on his face. I'll never forget it.

=== Australia vs England (1988) ===
The Wallabies won the first test against England 22–16 and consolidated this a week later in Sydney, winning the second test 28–8.

=== 1988 Bledisloe Cup ===
Following Australia's two-test series against England, Lynagh played in the Wallabies three-test 1988 Bledisloe Cup series against the All Blacks. Australia lost the first test 32–7, in what was the Wallabies' biggest loss to the All Blacks since 1972. Lynagh set-up a try for Australian winger Ian Williams in the first half with a cross-field kick that Williams was able to touch down before the ball was about to fall into touch. Australia trailed New Zealand 14–4 at half-time. Lynagh kicked a penalty shortly after half-time to reduce the All Blacks' lead to 14–7. However, Australia would remain scoreless for the rest of the match, while New Zealand would go on to defeat the Wallabies 32–7.

In between the first and second test of the 1988 Bledisloe Cup series, Lynagh played for Queensland in a provincial match against the All Blacks, in what was Bob Templeton's last game as coach of Queensland. Queensland held a 6–3 half-time lead against New Zealand; however, Lynagh was injured 10 minutes into the second half with a badly corked thigh, and New Zealand went on to win the game 27–12. The loss was Queensland's seventh consecutive loss of the 1988 season. Following this match, Lynagh was unavailable for Australia's second Bledisloe Cup test against New Zealand. After a provincial match the All Blacks played against Randwick, where Randwick was able to unsettle New Zealand with Lloyd Walker at fly-half, Walker was selected for Australia's second Bledisloe Cup test against New Zealand at five-eighth. The Wallabies held an unexpected 16-6 half-time lead, and went on to draw the All Blacks 19–19 in what was the only time in 50 consecutive games (including 23 test matches) that New Zealand did not achieve victory.

After recovering from injury, Lynagh was a shock omission for the Wallabies' third test against the All Blacks, with Australian selectors opting to retain Lloyd Walker in the fly-half position. Before the test, Australia coach Bob Dwyer told the Courier-Mail that: 'Lloyd was always going to be the fly-half because we feel he is the man for the occasion. He has the type of game we want for the All Blacks.' He further stated that:

We recognise Noddy's talents. I had planned to use his running game in the second test at Ballymore had he been fit. When he was forced to withdraw another man came along and made the most of it. It's as simple as that. So it came down to a decision between Noddy and Cookie for inside centre. We chose Cook because of his defence. Not that Noddy can't tackle but Michael is so aggressive.

Dwyer's decision to not select Lynagh drew criticism from many. Former Australian captain David Codey wrote in The Daily Sun on 14 July that: "The omission of Lynagh was a mistake of the magnitude that Dwyer had made in 1982 when he selected Glen Ella ahead of Roger Gould for the test against Scotland."

=== 1988 Australia rugby union tour of England, Scotland and Italy ===
Following the 1988 Bledisloe Cup series, Lynagh announced his unavailability for the 1988 Australia rugby union tour of England, Scotland and Italy. Andrew Slack explained in Noddy (1995) that: 'He'd been playing almost non-stop for the best part of six years, he had a few niggling injuries, his form had been mildly inconsistent during 1988 and he felt stale.' However, after the Wallabies lost three of the first four games on the English-leg of the tour, and following an injury to five-eighth David Knox, Lynagh was asked by the Australian team management to rejoin the Australian team for the tour, to which he agreed. Slack documented in Noddy (1995) that: "In truth, they could have covered David Knox's injury, but it was a convenient excuse to call for Lynagh." Despite his unavailability for the first four games on tour and only playing in six matches (including three test), Lynagh finished the tour the Wallabies leading points scorer with 80 points, ahead of Campese with 72 and Knox with 69. In For Love Not Money (1992), Simon Poidevin wrote that: 'It was no coincidence that the improved performances coincided with the late arrival as a replacement of Michael Lynagh, who gave the inside backs far more experience and composure.'

Lynagh played his first tour game in Australia's fifth provincial match against a Midlands side in Leicester – a 25–18 win, in which he contributed 13 points. However, Australia would go on to lose their first test on tour against England 28–19, in which Lynagh converted two of the Wallabies' three tries, and added a penalty goal.

Australia won their second test on tour against Scotland 32–13, in which Lynagh kicked five goals from 11 attempts, which included three conversions from five attempts, and two penalty goals from four attempts. He also set-up Campese for two tries with chip-kicks. Following the test, Scotland's coach Sir Ian McGeechan highlighted one moment involving Michael Lynagh as being among the highpoints of the match. In Noddy (1995) Andrew Slack documented that: "Midway through the second half, Lynagh gathered a ball from the kick-off, executed a little jink and ran right through the Scottish pack, setting in chain a seventy-metre movement. No try resulted but an ensuing penalty, which he kicked, put Australia 28–7 ahead. 'When he took that kick-off,' said Ian McGeechan, 'I thought to myself: there he is. Welcome back to international rugby Michael Lynagh – unfortunately!'"

The Wallabies finished the United Kingdom-leg of their tour with a 40–22 victory over the Barbarians, in which Lynagh scored 20 points. Lynagh concluded the tour playing for the Wallabies in a 55–6 victory over Italy, in which he equaled his own Australian individual points scoring record in a test match of 23 points, scoring a try, eight conversions and a penalty. This equaled his record previously set on three occasions – against Canada in the first test of 1985, France in the single test of 1986, and Argentina in the first test of 1986. Following the test match Australian coach Bob Dwyer said, "This is the best I've seen Michael Lynagh play in international rugby."

=== 1989 British Lions series ===
Prior to the commencement of Australia's three-test series against the British Lions, Lynagh played for Queensland in the Lions' third tour game of the 1989 British Lions tour to Australia, which Australia lost 19–15.

Lynagh commenced the Wallabies' 1989 international test season in their 1989 three-test series against the British and Irish Lions. Australia defeated the Lions 30–12 in the first test, in which the Wallabies scored four tries to the Lions' zero, with Lynagh contributing 14 points to the final score with his kicking.

Australia's half-back combination of Lynagh and Farr-Jones received many plaudits for their first test performance. In Behind the Lions, Jones et al. described Farr-Jones and Lynagh as "arguably one of the greatest combinations the world game has ever seen." They further praised the Wallaby half-backs by documenting that: "The pair were superb in the first test in Sydney, against a Lions team which lacked focus, accuracy and tempo." Sir Ian McGeechan, coach of the 1989 British Lions, praised Australia's halves, later writing: "Farr-Jones and Michael Lynagh, their half-backs, were dominant.' Peter Jenkins in Wallaby Gold reported that: 'There were four tries and could have been four more. Five-eighth Michael Lynagh was unerring with both his on-field decision-making and his right boot, frequently turning around the Lions' forwards with pinpoint accuracy.' In Perfect Union (1995) former England captain Will Carling called Farr-Jones and Lynagh 'at the time quite easily the best half-back partnership in world rugby.' Following the first test, Lynagh's half-back partner Nick Farr-Jones offer him the following complement: "Noddy can run, he can set up players, he can step and he can kick. I'm not saying he is the best player I've ever seen, but the most complete. I put him up there with Mark Ella." In Beware the Dog former Lions hooker Brian Moore praised the Wallaby duo, writing that they played "near-perfect games". He further stated:

If anybody wants to study the effective use of ball and decision-making, they should watch the performances of Nick Farr-Jones and Michael Lynagh, the Aussie scrum half and fly half respectively, for that eighty minutes. No one has ever played a perfect game, but they made so few errors that realistically it was pretty close to ideal. Farr-Jones' distribution was swift, he knew when to take on the back row and especially when not to throw out rubbish. Lynagh released his outside backs in space, but it was his kicking out of hand that stays with me. Time and again I got up from scrums or rucks to see the ball rifling past me, bouncing a foot inside the touchline, leaving us to trudge sixty metres back. We were pinned in our own territory for so long that scores were inevitable and we were trounced 30–12.

However, the British Lions defeated Australia 19–12 in the second test. In Beware the Dog, Brian Moore wrote: "we knew that Australia was unlikely to play any better and that Farr-Jones and Lynagh would struggle to repeat the near-perfect games they had played." Lynagh converted the single Australian try of the test and also kicked two penalties to achieve the milestone of scoring 400 career test points. Lynagh kicked three goals from six attempts and set up a try for full-back Greg Martin – the first try of the test – in the first quarter of the match. Dan Crowley in Undercover Prop (2007) documented that Australia's only try came when "Gavin Hastings fumbled a Michael Lynagh bomb." The ball came back to Nick Farr-Jones. Farr-Jones passed the ball to Lynagh, Lynagh threw a long pass to Greg Martin, standing unmarked on the wing, and Martin scored a try unmarked. However, with Australia leading the Lions 12–9, and with less than 15 minutes remaining in the game, one of Lynagh's penalty kicks hit the upright of a goal-post and bounced back into the field of play. The Lions scored two tries in the final five minutes of the test to win the test 19–12.

=== 1989 Australia rugby union tour ===
Following the single Bledisloe Cup test of 1989, Lynagh toured with the Wallabies for their 1989 Australia rugby union tour, which contained two test against France.

Lynagh played in Australia's first test against France in Strasbourg, won 32–15, in what was France's biggest loss since South Africa defeated them 25–3 in 1952. France opened the scoring in the first half of the test after Lynagh was penalised for rushing up on his opposite fly-half Didier Camberabero. Camberabero kicked a penalty goal to give France a 3–0 lead. However, Lynagh responded with the next score in the game, kicking a penalty goal, after French flanker Éric Champ was penalised for hands in the ruck. With the score tied at 3–3, Camberabero kicked a long-range drop goal, 10 metres inside Australian territory and on a slight angle, to give France a 6–3 lead. Lynagh responded with another penalty goal after France were penalised for barging in the line-out.

Late in the first half, with Australia trailing France 6–12, Lynagh executed what Michael Blucher described as "a magnificent front-on tackle on Éric Champ." Moments later, the Wallabies had an attacking scrum 10 metres inside French territory. The ball came to Lynagh at stand-off, who hoisted it high to test French full-back Serge Blanco. Australia full-back Greg Martin contested Blanco for the ball, caught it, and offloaded the ball to Jason Little. Just before Little was tackled by Patrice Lagisquet, he passed the ball to Tim Horan in support, who scored a try. Lynagh failed to convert Horan's try, and at halftime the Wallabies trailed France 10–12.

Five minutes into the second half, Lynagh called a move named "Froggy" that began with an offload to winger Ian Williams that resulted in a converted try to give Australia a 16–12 lead. "Froggy" required inside centre Horan to run a decoy, as if he were taking a 'switch pass'. Outside centre Jason Little would continue to slide across at a 45-degree angle, which would drag his opposite number across field, opening the channel between the opposing inside and outside centres. Meanwhile, winger Ian Williams was supposed to run a straight angle, allowing him to run through this channel. However, instead Lynagh made a tiny line-break and offloaded the ball to Williams in a tackle for a try. Lynagh converted Campese's try to give Australia a 28–15 lead. However, he failed to convert the final try of the game, scored by Horan near the corner flag, making the final score of the game 32–15 to the victorious Australians. However, Lynagh would play in Australia's second test on tour, which France won 25–19.

== 1990s ==
In 1991, Lynagh joined Italian club Benetton Treviso. He played for five years with the club and won the Italian championship at 1991–92 season.

In 1996, Lynagh joined Saracens of England at the advent of professionalism, after retiring from a glittering 12-year international career with Australia as the world record points scorer with 911 and a Rugby World Cup winner (1991).

Lynagh's arrival at the club was the first major signing after Nigel Wray took control of the club and he acted as a beacon to attract other players and fans alike. Lynagh helped Saracens to have their most successful season to date.

In the 1997–98 season, Saracens battled it out with Newcastle Falcons for almost the whole season for top spot in the league and when the two sides met in front of a crowd of nearly 20,000 Lynagh slotted a match winning drop goal in the dying minutes to send Vicarage Road into raptures. A month later he was on hand to steer Saracens to their famous Tetley's Bitter Cup 48–18 victory over Wasps at Twickenham, bringing the curtain down on a season to remember.

== Personal life ==
He married his Italian wife Isabella in 1996, when he first moved to England to play club rugby. After rugby retirement, he has since worked as a managing director for Dow Jones & Company. In 2012, after playing a game of golf, he suffered from a stroke after which he was required to undergo brain surgery in Singapore.

He has three sons all of who play professional rugby - Louis for Benetton Rugby, Tom for Reds and Nick for Harlequins Senior Academy. In the case of Louis and Tom they have also played international rugby for Italy and Australia respectively.

== Retirement ==
On 18 April 2012 Lynagh was admitted to the Royal Brisbane Hospital after experiencing sudden onset of headache, dizziness and visual disturbance after a coughing fit. There it was diagnosed that he had suffered a life-threatening stroke due to vertebral artery dissection. Lynagh was released from hospital on 2 May 2012, having largely recovered apart from a left hemianopsia (loss of the left half of the vision in both eyes).

Lynagh was made a Member of the Order of Australia in 1996, inducted into the Sport Australia Hall of Fame in 1999, and received an Australian Sports Medal in 2000. He was inducted into the International Rugby Hall of Fame in 2001 and the Wallaby Hall of Fame in 2013.

== Accolades ==
Former Australian rugby coach Bob Dwyer, in his first autobiography The Winning Way, claimed Lynagh to be one of the five most accomplished Australian rugby union players he had ever seen. Dwyer ranked Lynagh number one "for his range of point-scoring skills".

In 2007, former England captain Will Carling listed Lynagh as one of the 50 greatest rugby union players of all time. Carling ranked Lynagh at number 41, writing that he was a "great tactician, great kicker, very underrated runner, [and] pivot of 1991 World Cup-winning side."

In 2003, News Limited Newspapers The Daily Telegraph in Sydney and The Courier-Mail in Brisbane ranked the top 100 Australian rugby players of all time. Michael Lynagh was ranked among the top 10 greatest Australian rugby union players of all time.

| Preceded by David Codey | Australia national rugby union team captain 1987–1995 | Succeeded by Nick Farr-Jones |
