= Nigel Holt =

Australian rugby union international

- Full name: Nigel Colin Holt
- Born: 21 November 1961 (age 64) Winton, QLD, Australia
- Height: 193 cm (6 ft 4 in)
- Weight: 107 kg (236 lb)

Rugby union career
- Position: Lock
International career
Years	Team	Apps	(Points)
1984	Australia	1	(0)

Nigel Colin Holt (born 21 November 1961) is an Australian former rugby union international.

Holt was born in the rural Queensland town of Winton and attended Anglican Church Grammar School in Brisbane. His mother Judy served on Redland City Council and during the 1970s established the shire's first convenience store.

An imposing lock, Holt toured New Zealand with Queensland in 1982 and the following year gained a Wallabies call up for the tour of Italy and France, as a back up for David Hillhouse and Steve Williams. Neither of those players were named on the 1984 tour of Fiji and Holt was first choice lock for the one-off Test in Suva, which the Wallabies won 16–3. He kept his place in the Wallabies squad for that year's famed 1984 tour of Britain and Ireland, but didn't add to his solitary Test cap.

== See also ==
- List of Australia national rugby union players
