= James Black (rugby union) =

Australian rugby union international

- Full name: James William Black
- Born: 10 June 1958 (age 68) Manly, Sydney, Australia

Rugby union career
- Position: Centre / Fullback
International career
Years	Team	Apps	(Points)
1985	Australia	4	(4)

James William Black (born 10 June 1958) is an Australian former rugby union international.

Black was born in Sydney and attended Beacon Hill High School.

A utility back, Black was a noted goal-kicker in the Shute Shield for Manly and won a place on Australia's 1984 grand slam tour of Britain and Ireland. Although he didn't feature in the Tests, he scored 62 points from his eight tour matches, a tally bettered by only Michael Lynagh. He was capped four times for the Wallabies in 1985. An injury to Roger Gould gave Black a chance at fullback in a two-Test home series against Canada. He then played outside centre in a Bledisloe Cup match in Auckland, scoring his team's only try, before returning to fullback for a home Test against Fiji.

== See also ==
- List of Australia national rugby union players
