= Mark Titley =

Welsh rugby union player

- Born: Mark Titley; 3 May 1959 (age 67) Swansea, Wales
- Occupation: Financial Adviser

Rugby union career
- Position: Wing
Amateur team(s)
Years	Team	Apps	(Points)
1985–1994	Swansea RFC	260	(530)
International career
Years	Team	Apps	(Points)
1983–1990	Wales	15	(16)

Mark Titley is a former international Wales rugby union player. A winger, he played his club rugby for London Welsh RFC, Bridgend RFC and Swansea RFC. He was best known for his spell with Swansea where he scored 120 tries, 14 cons, 1pen and 1 drop goal. Titley was in the Wales squad for the 1987 Rugby World Cup.
