= Phil Lewis (rugby union) =

- Full name: Phillip Ivor Lewis
- Born: 6 January 1961 (age 65) Swansea, Wales
- Occupation: Policeman

Rugby union career
- Position: Wing
International career
| Years | Team | Apps | (Points) |
| 1984–86 | Wales | 8 | (8) |

Phillip Ivor Lewis (born 6 January 1961) is a Welsh former rugby union international.

Lewis, born in Swansea, was capped eight times for Wales during the 1980s. Debuting against the touring Wallabies in 1984, Lewis later featured in the 1985 and 1986 Five Nations Championships for Wales. He was a pacy winger and played for Llanelli at club level. Outside of rugby, Lewis would work as a policeman in the Ammanford area.

== See also ==
- List of Wales national rugby union players
