= Alun Davies (rugby union) =

Welsh rugby player (born 1956)

- Full name: Alun Eirian Davies
- Born: 25 March 1956 (age 70) Carmarthen, Wales

Rugby union career
- Position: Flanker
International career
Years	Team	Apps	(Points)
1984	Wales	1	(0)

Alun Eirian Davies (born 25 March 1956) is a Welsh former rugby union international.

Davies was born in Carmarthen and attended Ysgol y Strade in Llanelli. He played his rugby as a flanker for Llanelli RFC. Despite limited club appearance for Llanelli in 1984 due to pneumonia, he earned his only Wales cap that year against the touring Wallabies at Cardiff Arms Park. He later became coach of the Llanelli Wanderers.

== See also ==
- List of Wales national rugby union players
