= Brian McCall (rugby union) =

Rugby union player from Northern Ireland

- Full name: Brian William McCall
- Born: 17 June 1959 (age 67) Armagh, Northern Ireland

Rugby union career
- Position: Lock
International career
Years	Team	Apps	(Points)
1985–86	Ireland	3	(4)

Brian William McCall (born 17 June 1959) is a former British Army brigadier and engineer from Northern Ireland who was an Ireland rugby union international during the 1980s.

Born in Armagh, Northern Ireland, McCall was educated at The Royal School, Armagh and played for Queen's University, Ulster and London Irish over the course of his career.

McCall was capped as a lock in three Tests for Ireland. He featured in the Triple Crown winning team of 1985 and scored a try against England at Twickenham in 1986.

== See also ==
- List of Ireland national rugby union players
