= David Codey =

Australia international rugby union player (born 1957)

- Born: David Codey; 7 July 1957 (age 69) Orange, New South Wales
- School: Shore
- University: University of Queensland.

Rugby union career
- Position: Flanker
International career
Years	Team	Apps	(Points)
1983–1987	Australia	13	(8)

David Codey (born 7 July 1957) is an Australian former state and national representative rugby union player who made 13 Test match appearances for Wallabies between 1983 and 1987. He captained the national side on a single occasion in 1987.

Hailing from Orange in the state of New South Wales, Codey's secondary education included 4 years at the Shore school. His representative rise came after being spotted playing for Orange City and he made his state and national debut in 1983.

His sole Australian captaincy appearance was against the All Blacks in 1987. In the 1987 Rugby World Cup during the play-off for third place against Wales, he became the first Australian to be sent off during a test match.

Preceded by Simon Poidevin	Australian national rugby union captain 1987	Succeeded by Michael Lynagh
