= Ross Hanley =

Australian rugby union international

- Full name: Ross Gregory Hanley
- Born: 6 December 1961 (age 64) Atherton, QLD, Australia

Rugby union career
- Position: Wing
International career
Years	Team	Apps	(Points)
1983–85	Australia	3	(4)

Ross Gregory Hanley (born 6 December 1961) is an Australian former rugby union international.

Hanley was born in Atherton in Far North Queensland and attended St Joseph's College, Nudgee.

A speedy winger, Hanley was an Australian under-21 representative and had a four try performance in a match against Fiji under-21s. He gained 43 caps for Queensland and played first-grade for Brisbane club Brothers, where he featured in five premiership sides during the 1980s. Capped three times on the wing for the Wallabies, he made all of his Test appearances off the bench and scored a try on debut against the United States at the Sydney Cricket Ground in 1983, with his first touch of the ball. He was an uncapped member of the 1984 Australia tour of Britain and Ireland.

== See also ==
- List of Australia national rugby union players
