= 1989 Australia rugby union tour =

Summary
P	W	D	L
Total
10	5	0	5
Test match
2	1	0	1
Opponent
P	W	D	L
France
2	1	0	1

The 1989 Australia rugby union tour was a series of rugby union matches played on tour by the Australia national rugby union team in Canada and France between October and November 1989.

== Results ==
Scores and results list Australia's points tally first.

Opposing Team	For	Against	Date	Venue	Status
North American Wolverines	24	6	9 October 1989	Ontario	Tour match
British Columbia	43	15	12 October 1989	Victoria	Tour match
Comite du Pyrenees	30	22	17 October 1989	Toulouse	Tour match
Languedoc	10	19	21 October 1989	Béziers	Tour match
Côte d'Azur	22	10	25 October 1989	Toulon	Tour match
Comite des Alpes	7	9	28 October 1989	Grenoble	Tour match
France A	10	19	31 October 1989	Clermont-Ferrand	Tour match
France	32	15	4 November 1989	Strasbourg	Test match
Île-de-France	19	21	7 November 1989	Massy	Tour match
France	19	25	11 November 1989	Lille	Test match
