= Ross Reynolds (rugby union) =

Australian rugby union player

- Born: Ross John Reynolds; 27 September 1958 (age 68) Orange, New South Wales
- School: Mitchell College

Rugby union career
- Position: Number 8
Senior career
Years	Team	Apps	(Points)
1977–1980	Brothers Old Boys		
1980–1992	Manly		
1992–1995	Gordon		
Provincial / State sides
Years	Team	Apps	(Points)
1981-1987	New South Wales		
International career
Years	Team	Apps	(Points)
1984-1987	Australia	10	(8)
Coaching career
- Years: Team
- 1995–1996: Gordon (assistant coach)
- 1996: Australia 7s
- 1996–1997: Sydney University RFC (assistant coach)
- 1997–2002: Sydney University RFC (head coach)
- 1999: Australia 7s
- 1999–2002: Australian Universities
- 2002–2003: Orrell
- 2003–2004: Rotherham
- 2004–2005: Australia (assistant coach)
- 2005–2007: Brumbies (assistant coach)

Ross John Reynolds (born 27 September 1958 in Orange) is a former Australian rugby union player, coach and businessman.

== Biography ==
Educated at the Mitchell College, in whose rugby union team he played for four years, after the graduation in economy, Reynolds joined Manly RUFC, the club where he spent most of his amateur career, while he worked in the constructions sector.

He debuted for the Wallabies in 1984, in Suva against Fiji and then, took part at the 1984 tour of Britain, where Australia won its Grand Slam. He ended his international career during the 1987 Rugby World Cup, taking part only in the match against Japan, in the pool stage.

After retiring as player, Reynolds started his coaching career, after being assistant coach for Gordon RFC, he was appointed as coach for Australia Sevens, and then in 2001, he led University of Sydney team to its Shute Shield victory after 29 years; later moving to Europe, coaching the Orrell RFC, with which he won the Powergen Cup in 2003; in the following season, Reynolds coached Rotherham RFC, from which he resigned at the end of the season.

Returning in Australia, he was first lineout coach, and then, assistant coach of the Wallabies; a year later, he was appointed by the Brumbies from Canberra to fulfill the same role, which he held until the 2007 Super 14 season, before being replaced by Owen Finegan.

He founded and directs Reynolds Direct, a job searching company specialised in the constructions field.
