= Nick Farr-Jones =

Australia international rugby union player

Nick Farr-Jones AM
- Born: Nicholas Campbell Farr-Jones; 18 April 1962 (age 64) Caringbah, New South Wales, Australia
- School: Newington College
- University: Sydney University

Rugby union career
- Position: Scrum-half
Amateur team(s)
Years	Team	Apps	(Points)
- Sydney University
Provincial / State sides
Years	Team	Apps	(Points)
- New South Wales
International career
Years	Team	Apps	(Points)
1984–1993	Australia	63	(37)

Nicholas Campbell Farr-Jones AM (born 18 April 1962) is a former Australian rugby union player, who played as a scrum-half. He debuted for the Australia national team during the 1984 tour of Britain and Ireland. Farr-Jones was named "Player of the Series" for the 1986 tour of New Zealand, where Australia became the sixth team to win a test series there. He was appointed captain of the Wallabies in 1988 and is best known for leading the team to victory in the 1991 Rugby World Cup. Farr-Jones retired from international rugby in 1992 but briefly returned in 1993 for the Bledisloe Cup and a series against South Africa. He has since appeared as a rugby commentator on Sky Sports and serves as chairman of the New South Wales Rugby Union.

== Early life ==
Farr-Jones attended Newington College from 1974 to 1979 and St Andrew's College at the University of Sydney. Although not selected for the First XV at Newington, he played first grade rugby for the University of Sydney. When rugby was still considered an amateur sport, he also worked as a lawyer.

== Rugby ==
Farr-Jones was selected for the 1984 European tour, making his international debut for the Wallabies on 3 November 1984, in a 19–3 victory against England at Twickenham. He became a regular in the test side, scoring his first try in the final match against Scotland. He played in the 1986 Bledisloe Cup series win against the All Blacks and participated in the inaugural Rugby World Cup in 1987. In 1988, he was appointed captain of the Australian team.

As captain, Farr-Jones led Australia to two home test series wins against England, but the team was defeated in the 1988 Bledisloe Cup and lost the 1989 series to the British Lions. During this period, his performance was scrutinized by critics, and he faced challenges from opposing teams. In one instance, Robert Jones deliberately targeted Farr-Jones' injured foot during a match.

In 1990, after Australia lost the first two matches of the Bledisloe series, there was speculation that Farr-Jones might lose the captaincy. However, the team won the final test 21–9 in Wellington. The 1991 Bledisloe series ended in a tie, and Australia entered the Rugby World Cup with momentum. Farr-Jones dealt with a knee injury during the tournament, sitting out the pool match against Samoa and being substituted during the quarter-final. He returned for the semi-final against New Zealand and led the team to victory in the final.

In 1992, Farr-Jones contributed to Australia's victories over the All Blacks in the Bledisloe Cup and the Springboks in Cape Town, which affirmed the team's strong standing in international rugby. He retired from the sport but returned in 1993 for the final two home tests against South Africa after Australia lost the opening match of the series.

Farr-Jones earned 63 caps for Australia, including 36 as captain, and scored nine tries. He also set a world record with Michael Lynagh for playing 47 tests together as a half-back combination.

== Personal life ==
Farr-Jones identifies as a Christian and has spoken publicly about his faith. He is married and has four children. The Liberal Party of Australia reportedly considered him as a potential candidate for a byelection in the marginal Division of Wentworth.

== Honours ==
- 1992 Australia Day Honours: Member of the Order of Australia (AM) in recognition of service to the sport of Rugby Union football.
- 2001: Centenary Medal for service to Australian society through the sport of Rugby Union

== Awards ==
- 1999: Inducted into the International Rugby Hall of Fame
- 2008: Inducted into the Australian Rugby Union Hall of Fame
- 2011: Inducted into the IRB Hall of Fame alongside all other Rugby World Cup-winning captains and head coaches from the tournament's inception in 1987 through 2007 (minus the previously inducted John Eales)

Rugby Union Captain
Preceded by Michael Lynagh	Australian national rugby union captain 1988-92	Succeeded by John Eales
Preceded by David Kirk (New Zealand)	IRB World Cup winning captain 1991	Succeeded by Francois Pienaar (South Africa)
