= Andy McIntyre =

- Born: Andrew John McIntyre; 23 December 1955 (age 70) Toowoomba, Queensland
- School: Brisbane Grammar School

Rugby union career
- Position: Tighthead Prop
Amateur team(s)
| Years | Team | Apps | (Points) |
| 197?-198? | University of Queensland Rugby Club | | |
Provincial / State sides
| Years | Team | Apps | (Points) |
| 198x-198x | Queensland | | |
International career
| Years | Team | Apps | (Points) |
| 1982-1989 | Australia | 38 | (12) |

Andrew John McIntyre (born Toowoomba, 23 December 1955) is a former Australian rugby union player, who played as prop.

== Biography ==
Educated at Brisbane Grammar School, on Gregory Terrace, McIntyre practiced rugby union in the University of Queensland RC team, with which he won the state championship, beating Brothers Old Boys in 1979, when the final was replayed due to a draw; Mcintyre also played for the Queensland representative team in the 1980s.

He had his first cap for the Wallabies during the 1982 Bledisloe Cup against the All Blacks in Christchurch, and took part in the matches of the 1984 tour in Britain, where Australia won its first Grand Slam in the Northern Hemisphere.

Three years later, McIntyre was called in the Australian national team to play the 1987 Rugby World Cup, where the Wallabies finished in fourth place, and played his last international match in 1989, also against New Zealand, the team against which he played the first of his 38 international matches.

== Notes ==
https://web.archive.org/web/20190322231512/http://www.redsrugby.com.au/Reds/HonourBoard/TeamoftheCentury.aspx
