= Mark McBain =

Australian rugby union player

- Born: Mark McBain; 3 October 1959 (age 67) Brisbane, Queensland
- School: St Joseph's College

Rugby union career
- Position: Hooker
Senior career
| Years | Team | Apps | (Points) |
| 1979-91 | Brothers Old Boys | | |
Provincial / State sides
| Years | Team | Apps | (Points) |
| 1981-1991 | Queensland | | |
International career
| Years | Team | Apps | (Points) |
| 1983-1989 | Australia | 7 | (0) |
Coaching career
- Years: Team
- 2001-2002: Queensland Reds

Mark Ian McBain (born 30 October 1959, in Brisbane) is a former Australian rugby union player and former coach, who played as hooker for Queensland and for the Wallabies at the 1987 Rugby World Cup.

== Career ==
Grown up in the St Joseph's College, Gregory Terrace, McBain practiced rugby union in the Brothers Old Boys club. In 1981, he debuted for the Queensland representative team during a match which saw the State team playing against an Italy XV, won 68-11; in 1983, McBain debuted for Australia, also against Italy, at Rovigo, won 29-7. He also took part at the 1987 Rugby World Cup where he played only the pool stage match against Japan, and played his last international match two years later, against the British Lions in tour. After retiring from playing in 1990, he coached minor teams, until in 2001, when he received his first professional rugby role, as coach of the Queensland Reds, Super Rugby franchise from Queensland: he coached he team for two years, then, McBain returned to coach youth teams and regional teams, until 2006, when he decided to retire also from the coaching career and focus on his activities.
