= Enrique Rodríguez (rugby union) =

Argentine rugby union player

- Born: Enrique Edgardo Rodriguez; 20 June 1952 (age 74) Concordia, Argentina
- Height: 178 cm (5 ft 10 in)
- Weight: 110 kg (243 lb)

Rugby union career
- Position: Prop/Hooker
International career
Years	Team	Apps	(Points)
1979-1983	Argentina	13	(4)
1984-1987	Australia	26	(4)
1981	Tahiti	1	(4)
1980	Jaguars	4	(4)

Enrique "Topo" (Note: Meaning "mole" in Spanish) Edgardo Rodríguez is an Argentine and Australian retired rugby union player.

Rodriguez retired from rugby union after having played at international level for Argentina, Tahiti and Australia. He was part of the Australian team in the 1984 Grand Slam tour of Great Britain & Ireland. He also represented the Wallabies at the inaugural 1987 Rugby World Cup hosted by Australia & New Zealand. Rodriguez captained Australia against Mendoza Province in Argentina before retiring from international rugby in November 1987. He was also selected for the South American XV Jaguars in 1980, gaining four test caps against the Springboks.

Rodriguez played tighthead prop, loosehead prop and hooker.

After retiring from international rugby in 1987, he continued playing for his Sydney club Warringah before retiring in 1992. In 2006, A play called TOPO, written by Associate Professor Neil Cole, was shown at the Seymour Theatre Centre, Sydney in May–June 2007, portraying the "highs and lows of life" including his experiences of living with mental illness.

In August 2012 Rodriguez self-published a book called "The Art of Scrummaging". Amongst his practical and technical knowledge, and philosophies on the subject of scrummaging, the book also presents the opinions of 27 collaborators (ex-international players, coaches and referees). It was awarded the IPP Gold Medal for authoring and publishing. In 2015, Rodriguez published an updated version including law changes introduced by the International Rugby Board regarding the new 'engagement' Law sequence of the scrum, titled Rugby - The Art of Scrummaging II.

== Early life ==
Rodríguez was born in Concordia, Entre Rios, on 20 June 1952. He studied Psychology at Universidad Nacional de Córdoba. He started playing rugby for the University team in 1971. Rodríguez initially played wing, centre, and five-eighth, then in the back row before finally moving to the front row. He went on to be selected for the Cordoba Province representative team in 1976. In 2012 the "Consejo Deliberante" of Concordia city bestowed upon Rodriguez the distinction of "Honorific Life Ambassador" for the city of San Antonio de Padua de la Concordia, for his distinguished career as a sportsman.

== Career ==
Rodríguez played his first Test match for Argentina against New Zealand 1979, and his last Test match for the Argentine team was against Australia on 7 August 1983 at the Sydney Cricket Ground.

In March 1984, he emigrated with his family to Sydney, Australia. Warringah RFC organised his settlement in Sydney's Northern Beaches. Rodriguez played his first Test match for the Wallabies against Fiji on 9 June 1984 (barely 10 weeks after arrival) then a three-test series against New Zealand in Australia and the 1984 Grand Slam tour of UK and Ireland.

In June 1986 he played his first test against Argentina, and also took part in the Bledisloe Cup-winning team in New Zealand. His last international for Australia was against Argentina on 7 November 1987, Buenos Aires.

He was also capped for Tahiti against France in an invitational match to celebrate Bastille Day in Papeete (14 July 1981). Other notable players that appeared for Tahiti were All Blacks' backs Brett Codlin, Robert Kururangi and Tim Twigden.

== Career highlights ==
- 1979 Argentina rugby union tour of New Zealand
- 1979 Argentina tour of Australia
- 1980 South American XV tour of South Africa.
- 1983 Argentina rugby union tour of Australia
- 1984 Australia rugby union tour of Britain and Ireland
- 1986 Australia rugby union tour of New Zealand
- 1990-91 Barbarian F.C. (UK) Centenary Tour. Rodriguez captained two times.
- 1995 - Scrum & Forwards Coach of the Australian Under-21s tour of Zimbabwe and Argentina

== Honours and awards ==
- 2000 - Australian Sports Medal, for services to Rugby Union
- 2006 - Founder & CEO "BIPOLAR Education Foundation (2006–2013)
- 2013 - IPP Gold Medal for publishing: The ART of Scrummaging
- 2016 - Silver Medal for publishing: Rugby-The ART of Scrummaging II
- 2018 - Cancilleria Argentina (DFAT) - Distinction for Services to Argentina and Arg Community in Australia
- 2018 - Embassy of the Republic of Cuba - Certificate of Appreciation "Friendship with Cuba" Award

== Clubs ==
- Warringah Rugby Club 1984–1992
- Tala Rugby Club, 1978–1984
- Universidad Nacional de Cordoba RC, Captain & Coach 1971–1977
- Cordoba Province Seleccion (1976–1983) Captain
- Barbarian Football Club 1991 - vs. Scotland/Cork Constitution RC (Cork)/Old Wesley RC (Dublin)
