= Roger Gould (rugby union) =

Australia international rugby union player

- Born: Roger Gould; 4 April 1957 (age 69)
- Height: 193 cm (6 ft 4 in)
- Weight: 95 kg (209 lb)

Rugby union career
- Position: Fullback
International career
Years	Team	Apps	(Points)
1980–1987	Australia	25	(86)

Roger Gould (born 4 April 1957) is a former rugby union player who played fullback for both the Australian Wallabies and the Queensland Reds. He first played for Queensland in 1978 and for Australia in 1980. His last match for Australia was in the 1987 World Cup. Although Gould's career was cut short due to injury.

In 2009, Gould was elected to the Queensland Sport Hall of Fame, and was also added to the Queensland Team of the Century.

== Bibliography ==
- Campese, David; Bills, Peter (1991). On a Wing and a Prayer. Queen Anne Press. ISBN 0-356-17958-3.
- Campese, David (2003). Campo: Still Entertaining. Flick Pass Productions. ISBN 978-0975113004.
- Ella, Mark; Smith, Terry (1987). Path to Victory: Wallaby Power in the 1980s. ABC Enterprises. ISBN 0-642-52766-0.
- Harris, Bret; Ella, Mark (2007). Ella: The Definitive Biography. Random House Australia. ISBN 978-1-74166-691-5.
- Jenkins, Peter (2003). Wallaby Gold: The History of Australian Test Rugby. Random House Australia. ISBN 0-091-83928-9.
- Poidevin, Simon; Webster, Jim (1992). For Love Not Money. ABC Books. ISBN 0-7333-0148-7.
