= 1983 Argentina rugby union tour of Australia =

- Tour captain: Hugo Porta
Summary
| P | W | D | L |
Total
| 7 | 6 | 0 | 1 |
Test match
| 2 | 1 | 0 | 1 |
Opponent
| P | W | D | L |
Australia
| 2 | 1 | 0 | 1 |

The 1983 Argentina rugby union tour of Australia was a series of seven matches played by the Argentina national rugby union team in Australia in July and August 1983.

Argentina played two test v Australia, winning one of them. It was the first time they beat a Wallabie team in Australian territory.

== Touring team ==
Props

- Pablo Devoto (C.A. San Isidro - Buenos Aires)
- Fernando Morel (C.A. San Isidro - Buenos Aires)
- Serafín Dengra (San Martin - Buenos Aires)
- Enrique Rodríguez (Tala - Córdoba)

Hooker

- Andrés Courreges (C.A. San Isidro - Buenos Aires)
- Juan Baeck (Pueyrredón - Buenos Aires)

Locks

- Eliseo Branca (C.A. San Isidro - Buenos Aires)
- Gustavo Milano (Jockey Club Rosario - Rosario)
- Gabriel Travaglini (C.A. San Isidro - Buenos Aires)

Flanker and number 8

- Tomas Petersen (San Isidro Club - Buenos Aires)
- Ernesto Ure (Club Universitario B.A. - Buenos Aires)
- Carlos Neyra (Alumni - Buenos Aires)
- Buenaventura Minguenz (Sporting Club - Mar del Plata)
- Ricardo De Vedia (San Isidro Club - Buenos Aires)

Scrum halves

- Alfredo Soares Cache (San Isidro Club - Buenos Aires)
- Marcelo Larrubia (C.A. San Isidro - Buenos Aires)

Fly half

- Hugo Porta (Banco Nacion - Buenos Aires)

Center

- Rafael Madero (San Isidro Club - Buenos Aires)
- Marcelo Loffreda (San Isidro Club - Buenos Aires)
- Bernardo Miguens (Club Universitario B.A. - Buenos Aires)
- Guillermo Varone (C.A. San Isidro - Buenos Aires)

Wings

- Marcelo Campo (Pueyrredón - Buenos Aires)
- José Maria Palma (Pucará - Buenos Aires)
- Fernando González Moran (Pucará - Buenos Aires)

Full-backs

- Daniel Baetti (Atlético Rosario - Buenos Aires)
- Martín Sansot (Pueyrredón - Buenos Aires)

== Match details ==
Complete list of matches played by Argentina in Australia:

16 July 1983

| New South Wales | 7–19 | Argentina |
| Try: Hawker; Pen: Mark Ella | | Try: Palma, Porta; Con: Porta; Pen: Porta 2 Drop: Porta |

Cricket Ground, Sydney
Referee: Robert Halton (A.R.U.)

New South Wales :_ G.Ella, G.Da Vanzo, B.Papworth, M.Hawker, M.Martin, M.Ella (capt.), D.Voughan, R.Reynolds, S.Poidevin, D.Codey, P.Clemente, S.Williams, D.Curran, L.Walker (B.Malouf), O.Hall.
Argentina: M.Sansot, J.Palma, M.Loffreda, R.Madero, M.Campo, Porta (capt.), A.Soares Gache, B.Minguez, G.Travaglini, T.Petersen, G.Milano, E.Branca, E.Rodriguez, A.Courreges, S.Dengra.

20 July 1983

| Australian Capital Territory | 35–9 | Argentina |
| Try: Campese 2 Girvan, Galvin; McGrath, O'Neill, Con: Campese 4 Pen: Campese | | Pen: Porta; Drop: Porta 2 |

Ainslie Oval, Canberra
Referee: Kery Fitzgerald (A.R.U.)

A.C.T. : Campese (capt.), Thomas, Girvan, McGrath, Morton, Vest, Berry, O'Neill, Galvin, Utilelea, Donnellan, Kasrrzak, Takiari, Cowie, Didier
Argentina: D.Baetti, J.Palma, G.Varone, R.Madero, M.Campo, Porta (capt.), M.Larrubia, R.De Vedia, C.Neyra, E.Ure, G.Milano, E.Branca, P.Devoto, A.Courregee, F.Morel

24 July 1983

| Queensland | 28–34 | Argentina |
| Try: Lynagh; Slack, Roche; Con: Lynagh 2 Pen: Lynagh 4 | | Try: Campo 2 B.Minguez, Milano; Con: Porta 3 Pen: Porta 3 Drop: Porta |

Ballymore, Brisbane
Referee: Colín Collet (A.R.U.)

Queensland: Martin, Moon, Slack, Hanley, Grigg, Lynagh, Parker, Shaw (capt.), Hall, Roche, McLean, Hillhouse, Pileki, Rosa, Meadows
Argentina: M.Sansot (Bernardo Miguens), J.Palma, M.Loffreda, R.Madero, M.Campo, Porta (capt.), A.Soares Gache, G.Travaglini, B. Minguez, T.Petersen, G.Milano, E.Branca, E.Rodriguez, A.Courreges, S.Dengra.

27 July 1983

| New South Wales Country | 3–49 | Argentina |
| Pen: Mercer | | Try: Madero 2, Campo 2, Loffreda, Baeck, Varone; Minguez, Ure; Con: Loffreda 5 |

Narrabri
Referee: M.Phillips (A.R.U.)

New South Wales Country: P.Gell, D.Vignes, J.Grant, M.Scanlon, M.Kinlayson, B.Everingham, B.Turnar, S.Morgan, B.Abram, D.Carter, J.Boland, M.Smith, J.Coolican, P.Palmer (capt.), R.Mercer.
Argentina: B.Miguens, J.Palma, M.Loffreda, G.Varone, M.Campo, R.Madero, A.Soares Gache (capt.), R.De Vedía, B.Mínguez, E.Ure, G.Milano, G.Travaglini, P.Devoto, J.Baeck, S.Dengra

=== First test ===
31 July 1983

| Australia | 3–18 | Argentina |
| Pen: Campese | | Try: Minguez, Petersen; Con: Porta 2 Pen: Porta; Drop: Porta |

Ballymore, Brisbane
Attendance: 22.000
Referee: Clive Norling (W.R.U.)

Team details

| Australia | Argentina |

| Australia | | | Argentina |
| Roger Gould | FB | 15 | FB | Bernardo Miguens |
| David Campese | W | 14 | W | Jose Palma |
| Andrew Slack | C | 13 | C | Marcelo Loffreda |
| Mike Hawker | C | 12 | C | Rafael Madero |
| Brendan Moon | W | 11 | W | Marcelo Campo |
| (capt) Mark Ella | FH | 10 | FH | Hugo Porta (capt.) |
| Dominic Vaughan | SH | 9 | SH | Alfredo Soares Gache |
| David Codey | N8 | 8 | N8 | Buenaventura Minguez |
| Simon Poidevin | F | 7 | F | Tomas Petersen |
| Chris Roche | F | 6 | F | Ernesto Ure |
| David Hillhouse | L | 5 | L | Eliseo Branca |
| Duncan Hall | L | 4 | L | Gustavo Milano |
| Stan Pilecki | P | 3 | P | Serafin Dengra |
| Bill Ross | H | 2 | H | Andres Courreges |
| Declan Curran | P | 1 | P | Topo Rodriguez |
| | | Replacements |
| Tony Parker | SH | 16 |
| Steve Williams | L | 17 |

3 August 1983

| Queensland Country | 12–22 | Argentina |
| Try: Smee, Wholer, R.Burnees | | Try: Porta; Pen: Porta 5 Drop: Porta |

Townsville
Referee: Brian Kinsey (A.R.U.)

Queensland Country': Smee (capt.), Dillon, Wholer, Finch, Hood, Duncan, Iwikau, Astken, McLeod, R.Burnees, Filday, McCowan, Shaelds, Cox, K.Burnees.
Argentina: D.Baetti, M.Sansot, M.Loffreda, G.Varone, F.González Morán, Porta (capt.), M.Larrubia, R.De Vedia, C.Neyra, G.Travaglini, G.Milano, E.Branca, E.Rodriguez, J.Baeck, P.Devoto

=== Second test ===
7 August 1983

| Australia | 29–13 | Argentina |
| Try: Campese, Moon 2 Poidevin, Roche; Con: Campese 3 Pen: Campese | | Try: Milano; Pen: Porta 2 Drop: Porta |

Cricket Ground, Sydney
Attendance: 25.000
Referee: Clive Norling (W.R.U.)

Team details

| Australia | Argentina |

| Australia | | | Argentina |
| David Campese | FB | 15 | FB | Bernardo Miguens |
| Peter Grigg | W | 14 | W | Jose Palma |
| Andrew Slack | C | 13 | C | Marcelo Loffreda |
| Mike Hawker | C | 12 | C | Rafael Madero |
| Brendan Moon | W | 11 | W | Marcelo Campo |
| (capt.) Mark Ella | FH | 10 | FH | Hugo Porta (capt.) |
| Tony Parker | SH | 9 | SH | Alfredo Soares Gache |
| Duncan Hall | N8 | 8 | N8 | Buenaventura Minguez |
| Simon Poidevin | F | 7 | F | Tomas Petersen |
| Chris Roche | F | 6 | F | Ernesto Ure |
| Steve Williams | L | 5 | L | Eliseo Branca |
| David Hillhouse | L | 4 | L | Gustavo Milano |
| Stan Pilecki | P | 3 | P | Serafin Dengra |
| Bill Ross | H | 2 | H | Andres Courreges |
| John Meadows | P | 1 | P | Topo Rodriguez |
