= 1983 New Zealand rugby union tour of Australia =

- Coach: Bryce Rope
- Tour captain: Andy Dalton
- Top point scorer: Allan Hewson (14 points)
- Top try scorers: Andrew Slack (1 try); Simon Poidevin (1 try); Warwick Taylor (1 try)
Summary
| P | W | D | L |
Total
| 1 | 1 | 0 | 0 |
Test match
| 1 | 1 | 0 | 0 |
Opponent
| P | W | D | L |
Australia
| 1 | 1 | 0 | 0 |

Tour chronology
- ← 1981 Romania and France 1983 Great Britain →

The 1983 New Zealand rugby union tour of Australia was the All Blacks' seventeenth tour of Australia and their first one-off test tour since 1979 (4 years and 23 days). The tour was a one-off match between Australia and New Zealand at the Sydney Cricket Ground, Sydney. Considered the better side, and with the odds in their favour (6–4), New Zealand had only won five of their last ten fixtures against the Wallabies (50%). Australia were 9–10 outsiders, however, Wallabies coach Bob Dwyer commented: “The All Black aura of domination of five or six years ago is over... They were once supermen who couldn't be beaten but that All Black bogey doesn't exist any more.” New Zealand won the test 8–18. New Zealand coach Bryce Rope said that Australia and New Zealand were the two best rugby union teams in the world before the match. Wallaby coach, Bob Dwyer, insisted that Australia was the only team in the world (at the time) that could beat New Zealand, saying several days before the match, "I honestly reckon we're about the only side in the world who can beat them." The match was also David Campese's fourth match against the All Blacks. The first Bledisloe Cup test match in Australia to have a neutral referee Scotland's Brian Anderson was the first non Australian to referee a Bledisloe Cup Test in Australia

== Match details ==
20 August 1983
AEST (UTC+10)

| Australia | 8–18 | New Zealand |
| Try: Poidevin; Slack; Con: Campese (0/2) | Report | Try: Taylor; Con: Hewson (1/1); Pen: Hewson (4) |

Sydney Cricket Ground, Sydney
Attendance: 44,100
Referee: Brian Anderson (Scotland)

| FB | 15 | David Campese |
| RW | 14 | Peter Grigg |
| OC | 13 | Andrew Slack |
| IC | 12 | Mike Hawker |
| LW | 11 | Brendan Moon |
| FH | 10 | Mark Ella (c) |
| SH | 9 | Tony Parker |
| N8 | 8 | Duncan Hall Jr. |
| OF | 7 | Simon Poidevin |
| BF | 6 | Chris Roche |
| RL | 5 | Steve Williams |
| LL | 4 | David Hillhouse |
| TP | 3 | Stan Pilecki |
| HK | 2 | Bill Ross |
| LP | 1 | John Meadows |
Coach:
Bob Dwyer

| FB | 15 | Allan Hewson |
| RW | 14 | Stu Wilson |
| OC | 13 | Steve Pokere |
| IC | 12 | Warwick Taylor |
| LW | 11 | Bernie Fraser |
| FH | 10 | Ian Dunn |
| SH | 9 | Dave Loveridge |
| N8 | 8 | Murray Mexted |
| OF | 7 | Jock Hobbs |
| BF | 6 | Mark Shaw |
| RL | 5 | Andy Haden |
| LL | 4 | Graeme Higginson |
| TP | 3 | Gary Knight |
| HK | 2 | Andy Dalton (c) |
| LP | 1 | John Ashworth |
Coach:
Bryce Rope
