= 1981–82 Australia rugby union tour of Britain and Ireland =

Summary
P	W	D	L
Total
23	16	1	6
Test match
4	1	0	3
Opponent
P	W	D	L
Ireland
1	1	0	0
Wales
1	0	0	1
Scotland
1	0	0	1
England
1	0	0	1

The 1981–82 Australia rugby union tour of Britain and Ireland was a series of matches played by the Australia national rugby union team (nicknamed the Wallabies). The touring team played twenty-three matches between October 1981 and January 1982, winning sixteen games, drawing one and losing six. The scheduled final game, against the Barbarians, was cancelled due to heavy snow.

The team played four international matches but were successful in only one, against Ireland. The Wallabies subsequently lost to Wales, Scotland and England. Although they scored more tries than their opponents in each of the four internationals, the home teams' goal-kicking proved more reliable in every case.

Outside the international programme, the Wallabies won only once in their opening four matches. They lost to the English Midlands Division in the opening match, were held to a draw by the English Northern Division in the third match and lost to Bridgend in the fourth match. They then beat Wales B (the national second-tier side) by a single point in the next game. The sixth game brought a much better performance with a 37–6 win over Pontypool. Their form improved somewhat after that and they lost only one of the remaining thirteen non-international matches, to Munster in Cork.

The tour experience would prove invaluable however for a number of young players who in 1984 would lead the Wallabies to a Grand Slam tour victory. Mark Ella, Steve Williams, Simon Poidevin, Andrew Slack, Brendan Moon, Michael Hawker and Roger Gould filled Australia with hope during their 1981-82 tour, providing a preview of its eventual coming of age as a world-class rugby nation.

== The squad's leadership ==
The tour manager was Sir Nicholas Shehadie a 30 Test veteran and former Wallaby captain. He was at the time Chairman of the New South Wales Rugby Union and President of Australian Rugby Union. He had recently stepped down after fifteen years in local government public office including three years as the 75th Lord Mayor of Sydney. The coach was Bob Templeton.

Tour captain was Tony Shaw, the first Queenslander since Bill McLean in 1947–48 to captain Australia in the UK. Shaw would later marry McLean's daughter and made the 81–82 tour alongside Bill's son Peter and nephew Paul. Mark Loane would captain the side in the Test against England when Shaw was dropped from the team following the Scottish Test. Shaw had retaliated recklessly to niggling from Scotland player Bill Cuthbertson with a king-hit right in front of the referee. Shaw was to pay dearly for this as it would mark the end of his Test captaincy career.

== The tour ==
The tour was dogged by appalling weather: cold, rain and snow. The Australian players brought up on firm, fast playing surfaces were shackled in ankle-deep mud. After a training mishap hooker Bruce Malouf returned home with a broken leg without having played a match. Veteran half-back John Hipwell missed many games through persistent injuries.

So much had been expected of the Wallaby side and following the tour many reasons were offered up to explain the disappointing result of one international won from the four played. It was said that Paul McLean's kicking was not up to his usual standard; that the scrum lacked size and power; that Tony Shaw showed his pique in felling Cuthbertson and that the loss of Hipwell was a blow. Regardless of the reasons some bad luck was evident in the cancellation of the Barbarian clash due to heavy snow caused by the 1981–82 United Kingdom cold wave and perhaps symptomatic of much ill-luck on the tour. The journalist David Lord, who travelled with the squad, wrote venomously of a Queensland-New South Wales player rift in the team which if even half-true must have affected team morale.

== Matches ==
Scores and results list Australia's points tally first.

	Date	Opponent	Location	Result	Score
Match 1	17 October	Midland Division	Welford Road Stadium, Leicester	Lost	10–16
Match 2	21 October	Oxford University	Iffley Road, Oxford	Won	19–12
Match 3	24 October	Northern Division	County Ground, Gosforth	Drew	6–6
Match 4	28 October	Bridgend	Brewery Field, Bridgend	Lost	9–12
Match 5	31 October	Wales A	National Stadium, Cardiff	Won	10–9
Match 6	4 November	Pontypool	Pontypool Park, Pontypool	Won	37–6
Match 7	7 November	London Division	Twickenham Stadium, London	Won	25–14
Match 8	11 November	Devon and Cornwall	County Ground Stadium, Exeter	Won	49–6
Match 9	14 November	Ulster	Ravenhill Stadium, Belfast	Won	12–6
Match 10	17 November	Munster	Musgrave Park, Cork	Lost	6–15
Match 11	21 November	Ireland	Lansdowne Road, Dublin	Won	16–12
Match 12	25 November	Leicester	Welford Road Stadium, Leicester	Won	18–15
Match 13	28 November	Swansea	St. Helen's, Swansea	Won	12–3
Match 14	1 December	Pontypridd	Sardis Road, Pontypridd	Won	6–3
Match 15	5 December	Wales	National Stadium, Cardiff	Lost	13–18
Match 16	9 December	Lancashire	Vale of Lune RUFC, Lancaster	Won	22–6
Match 17	12 December	Glasgow	Murrayfield Stadium, Edinburgh	Won	31–0
Match 18	15 December	Scottish North and Midlands	Linksfield Stadium, Aberdeen	Won	36–6
Match 19	19 December	Scotland	Murrayfield Stadium, Edinburgh	Lost	15–24
Match 20	22 December	South and South-West Division	Kingsholm Stadium, Gloucester	Won	16–3
Match 21	29 December	Combined Services	Aldershot	Won	33–9
Match 22	2 January	England	Twickenham Stadium, London	Lost	11–15
Match 23	5 January	West Wales	Stradey Park, Llanelli	Won	19–3
Match 24	9 January	Barbarians	National Stadium, Cardiff	Match cancelled	

== Test matches ==
=== Ireland ===
21 November 1981

Ireland	12–16	Australia
(12 – 4pg) Ward	Report	O'Connor (4 – 1t); Gould (3 – 1fg); McLean (9 – 3pg)

Lansdowne Road, Dublin
Attendance: 54,000
Referee: Brian Anderson (SRU)

Australia's victory was based on a magnificent defensive display. Ireland's front five won more ball than Australia but Australia's tackling and speed to the loose ball proved decisive. Paul McLean opened the scoring with an 11th-minute penalty goal and Roger Gould doubled the lead soon after with a dropped goal. McLean extended the lead to 9–0 with a further penalty before Tony Ward's penalty goal finally put Ireland on the board. Just before half-time McLean's third penalty put Australia 12–3 ahead. Ward cut the lead to 12–6 with a second penalty but O'Connor scored the only try of the game to make it 16–6 to Australia. Ward reduced their lead again with two more penalties but Australia hung on to win 16–12.

AUSTRALIA: Roger Gould, Michael O'Connor, Andrew Slack, Michael Hawker, Brendan Moon, Paul McLean, John Hipwell, John Meadows, Chris Carberry, Tony D'Arcy, Tony Shaw (c), Peter McLean, Simon Poidevin, Greg Cornelsen, Mark Loane.

IRELAND: Hugo MacNeill, Trevor Ringland, David Irwin, Paul Dean, Terry Kennedy, Tony Ward, Robbie McGrath, Phil Orr, John Cantrell, Mick Fitzpatrick, Brendan Foley, Donal Lenihan, John O'Driscoll, Fergus Slattery (c), Willie Duggan

=== Wales ===
5 December 1981

Wales	18–13	Australia
(4 – 1t) Moriarty (3 – 1fg) Davies (11 – 3pg, 1g) Evans	Report	M. Cox (4 – 1t); Slack (4 – 1t); McLean (5 – 1pg, 1g)

Cardiff Arms Park, Cardiff
Attendance: 56,000
Referee: John West (IRFU)

Australia scored two tries to Wales's one but were beaten by a powerful performance by the Welsh pack, in which new cap Moriarty was outstanding. Goal-kicking was a significant difference between the two teams, with Paul McLean missing four of his six kicks at goal. Gwyn Evans opened the scoring with a penalty goal for Wales with Paul McLean equalising in kind soon after. Slack then scored a try after Holmes had been bundled off the ball after incorrectly calling for a mark, although McLean failed to convert. Evans scored a second penalty to make the half-time score 7–6 to Australia. In the second half, Mitchell Cox scored a try in the corner with McLean converting to make it 13–6. Wales replied almost immediately with a try from Moriarty after a 30-metre run from Rees and Evans' conversion made the score 13–12. Davies, captaining Wales for the first time, dropped a goal to put Wales ahead 15–13 before Evans' third penalty goal made the final score 18–13.

AUSTRALIA: Roger Gould, Mitchell Cox, Andrew Slack (c), Michael Hawker (rep Mick Martin 48 min), Brendan Moon, Paul McLean, John Hipwell (rep Phillip Cox 65 min), Tony D'Arcy, Chris Carberry, Declan Curran, Tony Shaw (c), Peter McLean, Simon Poidevin, Greg Cornelsen, Mark Loane.

WALES: Gwyn Evans, Robert Ackerman, Pat Daniels, Alun Donovan, Clive Rees, Gareth Davies (c), Terry Holmes, Ian Stephens, Alan Phillips, Graham Price, Richard Moriarty, Geoff Wheel, Mark Davies, Gareth Williams, Jeff Squire

=== Scotland ===
19 December 1981

Scotland	24–15	Australia
(4 – 1t) Renwick (3 – 1fg) Rutherford (17 – 5pg,1g) Irvine		Moon (4 – 1t); Poidevin (4 – 1t); Slack (4 – 1t); McLean (3 – 1pg)

Murrayfield Stadium, Edinburgh
Attendance: 39,213
Referee: Roger Quittenton (RFU)

Disaster struck in the Scotland Test for Wallaby captain Tony Shaw. He was questioning referee Quittenton when the Scottish lock Bill Cuthbertson kept niggling him. Shaw turned and hit Cuthbertson with a right, flooring him in front of the referee and the TV cameras. That moment marked the end of his Wallaby captaincy.

Australia scored three tries, all in the first half, to Scotland's one, but were beaten largely due to the fine goal-kicking of Andy Irvine, who scored a then-record 17 points for Scotland. Irvine scored three consecutive penalty goals to put Scotland 9–0 up but his charged-down kick allowed Poidevin to score an unconverted try. A second unconverted try for Moon followed, bringing the scores to 9–8, before Slack's try put Australia ahead for the first time at 12–9. McLean and Irvine traded penalties to make the score 15–12 to the Wallabies at half-time. Irvine levelled the scores at the start of the second half with his fifth penalty goal and Rutherford's dropped goal put Scotland back in the lead. Gould's failure to gather Rutherford's kick and a kindly bounce gave a try to Renwick near the posts which Irvine converted to give Scotland their 24–15 win. The game was clean apart from the Shaw-Cuthbertson incident.

AUSTRALIA: Roger Gould, Mitchell Cox, Andrew Slack, Paul McLean, Brendan Moon, Mark Ella, Phillip Cox, John Meadows, Chris Carberry, Tony D'Arcy, Tony Shaw (c), Peter McLean, Simon Poidevin, Greg Cornelsen, Mark Loane.

SCOTLAND: Andy Irvine (c), Keith Robertson, Jim Renwick, David Johnston, Roger Baird, John Rutherford, Roy Laidlaw, Jim Aitken, Colin Deans, Iain Milne, Bill Cuthbertson, Alan Tomes, Jim Calder, David Leslie, Iain Paxton

=== England ===
2 January 1982

England	15–11	Australia
(4 – 1t) Jeavons (2 – 1g) Dodge (9 – 3pg) Rose		Moon (8 – 2t); McLean (3 – 1pg)

Twickenham Stadium, London
Attendance: 60,000
Referee: Alun Richards (WRU)

For the fourth time in as many internationals, Australia scored more tries than their opponents but were beaten by superior goal-kicking. The England pack gave a powerful display with an outstanding performance by Colclough.

Rose's two early penalty goals, with one by Paul McLean in between, gave England a 6–3 lead at half-time. Moon then scored after a loose ball was hacked downfield by the backs to put Australia 7–6 ahead going into the final quarter of the match, although McLean failed to convert. When Mark Ella was caught near his own line the England forwards drove on and Jeavons scored from the maul. Dodge kicked the conversion to put England 12–7 up. Rose extended the lead to 15–7 with his third penalty goal before Moon scored his second try, near the corner. McLean missed with the kick (his fourth miss from five attempts at goal) but it was too late to affect the final result, 15–11 to England.

The match was also notable for the half-time appearance of the streaker, Erika Roe.

Australia: Paul McLean, Michael O'Connor, Andrew Slack (c), Michael Hawker, Brendan Moon, Mark Ella, John Hipwell, John Meadows, Chris Carberry, Tony D'Arcy, Steve Williams, Peter McLean, Simon Poidevin, Greg Cornelsen, Mark Loane (c).

England: Marcus Rose, John Carleton, Clive Woodward, Paul Dodge, Mike Slemen (rep Nick Stringer 63 min), Huw Davies, Steve Smith, Colin Smart, Peter Wheeler, Gary Pearce, Bill Beaumont (c), Maurice Colclough, Nick Jeavons, Peter Winterbottom, Bob Hesford

== Other matches ==
=== Midland Division ===
17 October 1981	Midland Division	16–10	Australia	Welford Road Stadium, Leicester
	Try: Holdstock, Jeavons; Con: Rose; Pen: Rose (2)		Try: Moon; Pen: Paul McLean (2)	Referee: Clive Norling

=== Oxford University ===
22 October 1981	Oxford University	12–19	Australia	Iffley Road, Oxford
	Try: Wyatt; Con: Barnes; Pen: Barnes (2)		Try: Roche (2), Grigg, Gary Ella; Drop: Mark Ella	Referee: Brian Anderson

=== Northern Division ===
24 October 1981	Northern Division	6–6	Australia	County Ground, Gosforth
	Pen: Spaven; Drop: Slemen		Pen: Paul McLean (2)	Referee: Ken Rowlands

=== Bridgend ===
28 October 1981	Bridgend	12–9	Australia	Brewery Field, Bridgend
	Pen: Pearce (4)		Try: Meadows; Con: Hawker; Pen: Mark Ella	Referee: David Burnett

=== Wales B ===
31 October 1981	Wales B	9–10	Australia	National Stadium, Cardiff
	Pen: Wyatt (2); Drop: Dacey		Try: Moon, Slack; Con: Paul McLean	Referee: Laurie Prideaux

=== Pontypool ===
4 November 1981	Pontypool	6–37	Australia	Pontypool Park, Pontypool
	Pen: Lewis (2)		Try: Martin (2), Cornelsen, Shaw, Slack; Con: Paul McLean (4); Pen: Paul McLean (2); Drop: Paul McLean	Referee: Roger Quittenton

=== London Division ===
7 November 1981	London Division	14–25	Australia	Twickenham Stadium, London
	Try: McGregor, Bailey; Pen: Greenhalgh (2)		Try: Moon (2), Mark Ella; Con: Ella, Paul McLean; Pen: Paul McLean (2), Mark Ella

=== Devon and Cornwall ===
11 November 1981	Devon and Cornwall	6-49	Australia	County Ground Stadium, Exeter
	Pen: Martin (2)		Try: Moon (3), Parker (2), M. Cox, D'Arcy, Slack; Con: Paul McLean (7); Pen: Paul McLean	Referee: G. Inglis

=== Ulster ===
14 November 1981	Ulster	6-12	Australia	Ravenhill Stadium, Belfast
	Pen: Goodrich (2)		Try: Paul McLean; Con: Paul McLean; Pen: Paul McLean (2)	Referee: W. Jones

=== Munster ===
17 November 1981	Munster	15-6	Australia	Musgrave Park, Cork
	Try: Derham; Con: Ward; Pen: Ward (2); Drop: Ward		Try: Grigg; Con: O'Connor	Referee: Alan Welsby

=== Leicester ===
25 November 1981	Leicester	15-18	Australia	Welford Road Stadium, Leicester
	Pen: Hare (2); Drop: Hare (2), Cusworth		Try: Martin; Con: Paul McLean; Pen: Paul McLean (3); Drop: Mark Ella	Referee: M. D. M. Rea

=== Swansea ===
28 November 1981	Swansea	3-12	Australia	St. Helen's, Swansea
	Pen: Dacey		Try: Gould, M. Cox, Moon	Referee: John West

=== Pontypridd ===
1 December 1981	Pontypridd	3-6	Australia	Sardis Road, Pontypridd
	Pen: Hodgkinson		Pen: Mark Ella (2)	Referee: Tony Trigg

=== Lancashire ===
9 December 1981	Lancashire	6-22	Australia	Powder House Lane, Lancaster
	Pen: O'Brien (2)		Try: Mathers, M. Cox, Loane; Con: Paul McLean (2); Pen: Paul McLean; Drop: Mark Ella	Referee: A. Richards

=== Glasgow ===
12 December 1981	Glasgow	0-31	Australia	Murrayfield Stadium, Edinburgh
			Try: Glen Ella (2), Lucas (2), Mark Ella, Grigg, Martin; Pen: Mark Ella	Referee: Colin High

=== Scottish North and Midlands ===
15 December 1981	North and Midlands	6-36	Australia	Linksfield Stadium, Aberdeen
	Pen: Irvine (2)		Try: Grigg (4), Roche, Gould; Con: Paul McLean (3); Pen: Paul McLean (2)	Referee: Fred Howard

=== South and South-West Division ===
22 December 1981	South and South-West Division	3-16	Australia	Kingsholm Stadium, Gloucester
	Drop: Horton		Try: Mark Ella, Martin, Lucas; Con: Mark Ella (2)	Referee: K. C. Parfitt

=== Combined Services ===
29 December 1981	Combined Services	9-33	Australia	Aldershot
	Pen: Price (3)		Try: Mark Ella (2), Moon, Meadows, Peter McLean, Cornelsen; Con: Gould (5); Pen: Gould	Referee: A. Fisher

=== West Wales ===
5 January 1982	West Wales	3–19	Australia	Stradey Park, Llanelli
	Pen: Evans		Try: M. Cox, Martin, Mark Ella; Con: Gould (2); Pen: Gould	Referee: M. J. Morgan

== Touring party ==
- Tour manager: Sir Nicholas Shehadie
- Coach : Bob Templeton
- Captain: Tony Shaw

=== Squad ===
Tour appearances include appearances as a replacement, which are shown in brackets e.g. (1R)

Name	Tests	Club	Career caps	Tour apps	Position	Tour pts
Roger Gould	3	Wests Brisbane	25	12	Full back	31
Glen Ella	0	Randwick RUFC	4	7	Full back	8
Andrew Slack	4	Brisbane Souths	39	17 (2R)	Three-quarter	20
Brendan Moon	4	Brisbane Brothers	35	16 (1R)	Three-quarter	48
Mick Martin	1	Parramatta Two Blues	6	13 (1R)	Three-quarter	24
Peter Grigg	0	Cities – Townsville	25	13	Three-quarter	28
Gary Ella	0	Randwick RUFC	6	5	Three-quarter	4
Michael O'Connor	2	Brisbane Norths	12	9	Three-quarter	6
Michael Hawker	3	Sydney University	25	12 (1R)	Three-quarter	2
Mitchell Cox	1	Manly RUFC	2	12 (1R)	Three-quarter	20
Mark Ella	2	Randwick RUFC	25	14	Half	50
Paul McLean	4	Brisbane Brothers	30	15 (1R)	Half	118
John Hipwell	3	Newcastle Waratahs	36	7	Half	0
Phillip Cox	2	Manly RUFC	16	8 (1R)	Half	0
Anthony Parker	0	University of Queensland	3	10 (1R)	Half	8
Simon Poidevin	4	University of NSW	59	13	Forward	4
Peter McLean	4	Easts Brisbane	16	12	Forward	4
Tony Shaw (c)	3	Brisbane Brothers	36	14	Forward	4
Mark Loane	4	University of Queensland	28	17	Forward	4
Stan Pilecki	0	Wests Brisbane	18	9	Forward	0
Greg Cornelsen	4	Brisbane Norths	25	11	Forward	8
Tony D'Arcy	3	Brisbane Brothers	10	15 (1R)	Forward	4
John Meadows	2	Wests Brisbane	22	12	Forward	8
Chris Carberry	4	GPS Brisbane	13	12	Forward	0
Steve Williams	1	Manly RUFC	28	12 (1R)	Forward	0
Bruce Malouf	0	Randwick RUFC	1	0	Forward	0
Chris Roche	0	Brisbane Norths	17	12	Forward	12
Lance Walker	0	Parramatta Two Blues	2	10 (1R)	Forward	0
Declan Curran	1	Sydney University	5	11	Forward	0
Duncan Hall	0	University of Queensland	15	11	Forward	0
Peter Lucas	0	St George Rugby Union	3	8	Forward	12
Mick Mathers	0	Eastwood Rugby Club	2	9 (1R)	Forward	4

== Sources ==
- Howell, Max (2005) Born to Lead – Wallaby Test Captains, Celebrity Books, Auckland NZ
- Shehadie, Nicholas (2003) A Life Worth Living, Simon & Schuster Australia
- Jenkins, Vivian (1983). Rothmans Rugby Yearbook 1982–83. Rothmans Publications Ltd. ISBN 0-907574-13-0.
