= 1980 Australia rugby union tour of Fiji =

Summary
P	W	D	L
Total
3	3	0	0
Test match
1	1	0	0
Opponent
P	W	D	L
Fiji
1	0	0	0

The 1980 Australia rugby union tour of Fiji was a series of 3 matches played in May 1980 by Australia in Fiji.

== Results ==
Scores and results list Australia's points tally first.

Opposing Team	For	Against	Date	Venue	Status
Nadi	25	11	17 May 1980	Lautoka	Tour match
Rewa	46	14	20 May 1980	National Stadium, Suva	Tour match
Fiji	22	9	24 May 1980	National Stadium, Suva	Test match

== Touring party ==
- Manager - K. J. Donald
- Assistand manager - Bob Templeton
- Captain - Paul McLean

=== Backs ===
- Peter Carson
- Mitchell Cox
- Phillip Cox
- Roger Gould
- Mark Ella
- Peter Grigg
- Michael Hawker
- Mick Martin
- Paul McLean
- Brendan Moon
- Michael O'Connor
- Andrew Slack

=== Forwards ===
- Keith Besomo
- Tony D'Arcy
- Duncan Hall
- Chris Handy
- Bruce Malouf
- Mick Mathers
- Peter McLean
- Stan Pilecki
- Simon Poidevin
- Don Price
- Bill Ross
- Tony Shaw
- Steve Williams

== Sources ==
- Howell, Max (2005) Born to Lead – Wallaby Test Captains, Celebrity Books, Auckland NZ
- Vivian Jenkins, ed. (1981). Rothmans Rugby Yearbook 1981–82. Rothmans Publications Ltd. ISBN 0-907574-05-X.
