= Simon Poidevin =

Australian rugby union player (born 1958)

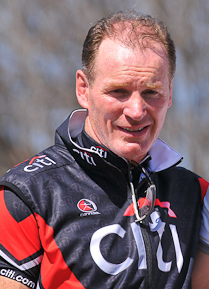
- Born: Simon Paul Poidevin; 31 October 1958 (age 68) Goulburn, New South Wales, Australia
- University: University of NSW

Rugby union career
- Position: Flanker
International career
Years	Team	Apps	(Points)
1980–1991	Australia	59	(25)

Simon Paul Poidevin (born 31 October 1958) is a former Australian rugby union player who played as a flanker. Poidevin made his Test debut for Australia against Fiji during the 1980 tour of Fiji. He was a member of the Wallabies side that defeated New Zealand 2–1 in the 1980 Bledisloe Cup series. He toured with the Eighth Wallabies for the 1984 Australia rugby union tour of Britain and Ireland that won rugby union's "grand slam", the first Australian side to defeat all four home nations, England, Ireland, Wales and Scotland, on a tour. He made his captaincy debut for the Wallabies in a two-Test series against Argentina in 1986, substituting for the absent Andrew Slack. He was a member of the Wallabies on the 1986 Australia rugby union tour of New Zealand that beat the All Blacks, one of six international teams and second Australian team to win a Test series in New Zealand. During the 1987 Rugby World Cup, he overtook Peter Johnson as Australia's most capped Test player against Japan, captaining the Wallabies for the third time in his 43rd cap. He captained the Wallabies on a fourth and final occasion on the 1987 Australia rugby union tour of Argentina before injury ended his tour prematurely. In 1988, he briefly retired from international rugby, reversing his decision 42 days later ahead of the 1988 Bledisloe Cup series. Following this series, Poidevin returned to the Australian side for the single 1989 Bledisloe Cup Test. He returned full-time to the Australian national squad for the 1991 season. Poidevin was a member of the Wallabies that won the 1991 Rugby World Cup, after which he retired from international rugby union.

Poidevin is one of only four Australian rugby union players, along with David Campese, Michael Lynagh and Nick Farr-Jones, to have won rugby union's Grand Slam, achieved a series victory in New Zealand, and won a Rugby World Cup.

Poidevin married Robin Fahlstom in 1995 and they have three sons.

== Early life ==
Simon Paul Poidevin was born on 31 October 1958 to Ann (née Hannan) and Paul Poidevin at Goulburn Base Hospital in Goulburn, New South Wales. He is the third of five children. His two older siblings are named Andrew and Jane, and his two younger siblings are called Joanne and Lucy. Poidevin's surname comes from Pierre Le Poidevin, a French sailor who was imprisoned by the English in the 1820s, but eventually settled in Australia and married an Irish woman. Poidevin was raised on a farm titled "Braemar", which is a 360-hectare property located on Mummell Road just outside of Goulburn, New South Wales, on which his family raised fat lambs and cattle.

Poidevin's family has a history containing many sporting achievements. His grandfather on his mother's side of his family, Les Hannan, was a rugby union player and obtained selection for the 1908–09 Australia rugby union tour of Britain. However, he broke his leg before the team departed from Australia and missed the tour. Hannan later fought in World War I in the 1st Light Horse Brigade, where he served as a stretcher bearer.

Poidevin's father's cousin, Dr Leslie Oswald Poidevin, was an accomplished cricketer, hitting 151 for New South Wales against McLaren's MCC side, and during the 1918–19 season he became the first Australian to score a century at all levels of cricket. He later became co-founder of the inter-club cricket competition in Sydney known as the Poidevin-Gray Shield. Dr Lesile Oswald Poidevin was also an accomplished tennis player. While studying medicine in Great Britain, he won the Swiss tennis championship and also played in the Davis Cup. In 1906, he represented Australasia with New Zealander, Anthony Wilding, when they were beaten by the United States at Newport, Wales. After this loss, Poidevin traveled to Lancashire to play cricket, where he made a century for his county the following day. Dr Leslie Oswald Poidevin's son, Dr Leslie Poidevin, was also an accomplished tennis player who won the singles tennis championship at Sydney University six years in a row between 1932 and 1937.

Poidevin's eldest sibling, Andrew, obtained a scholarship to study at Chevalier College at Bowral, where he represented NSW schoolboys playing rugby union. He went on to play rugby union for the Australian National University, ACT U-23s at breakaway, and later played with Simon for the University of New South Wales.

Poidevin's first school was the Our Lady of Mercy preparatory school in Goulburn where he was introduced to rugby league. He played for an under-6 team that was coached by Jeff Feeney, the father of the well-known motorbike rider, Paul Feeney. For his primary education, Poidevin attended St Patrick's College (now Trinity Catholic College), where rugby league was the only football code. His first team at St Patrick's College was the under-10s. During his childhood, Poidevin played rugby league with Gavin Miller, who would go on to play rugby league for the Australia national rugby league team, New South Wales rugby league team and Cronulla-Sutherland Sharks.

Poidevin changed football codes and played rugby union when he moved into senior school at St Patrick's College, where rugby union was the only form of rugby played. Poidevin made the school's 1st XV in his penultimate year at school and the team remained undefeated throughout the season. Following this, Poidevin made the ACT schools representative team for the Australian schools championship in Melbourne. The ACT schools representative team defeated New South Wales, but lost the final the Queensland.

Upon finishing school he played a season with the Goulburn Rugby Union Football Club and then, in 1978, he moved to Sydney to study at the University of New South Wales, from which he graduated in 1983 with a Bachelor of Science (Hons). He made his first grade debut with the university's rugby union team in 1978. In 1982 he moved clubs to Randwick, the famous Galloping Greens, home of the Ella brothers and many other Wallabies.

== Rugby Union career ==
=== 1979 ===
==== New South Wales ====
In 1979 Poidevin made his state debut for New South Wales, replacing an injured Greg Craig for New South Wales' return match against Queensland at T.G. Milner Field. Queensland defeated New South Wales 24–3.

=== 1980 ===
In 1980 Poidevin went on his first overseas rugby tour with the University of NSW to the west coast of North America. The tour included games against the University of British Columbia in Vancouver, Stanford, UCLA, Long Beach State and Berkeley.

==== Sydney ====
Following the 1980 University of NSW tour to the west coast of America, Poidevin achieved selection for the Sydney rugby team coached by former Wallaby Peter Crittle. Shortly following this selection, the Sydney rugby side completed a brief tour to New Zealand, that included matches against Waikato, Thames Valley and Auckland. Sydney won all three games, including a 17–9 victory over Auckland. After returning to Australia from New Zealand, Poidevin participated in three preparatory matches Sydney played against Victoria, the ACT and the President's XV – all won convincingly by Sydney. Poidevin then played in Sydney's seventh game of their 1980 season against NSW Country, won 66–3. Poidevin popped the AC joint in his shoulder in the match against NSW Country when Country forward Ross Reynolds fell on top of him while he was at the bottom of a ruck. Due to this injury, Poidevin missed the interstate match between New South Wales and Queensland in 1980, which New South Wales won 36–20 – their first victory over Queensland since 1975.

==== Australia rugby union tour of Fiji ====
Shortly following Sydney's win against NSW Country, Poidevin achieved national selection for the 1980 Australia rugby union tour of Fiji. Poidevin concealed his shoulder injury, sustained in the Sydney match against NSW Country, from the Australian team management, so he could play for Australia.

Poidevin made his Australian debut in the Wallabies' first provincial match of the tour against Western Unions on 17 May 1980, which Australia won 25–11. Poidevin played in Australia's second game against Eastern Unions, won 46–14.

Poidevin made his Test debut for Australia following these two provincial matches against Fiji on 24 May 1980, won by Australia 22–9.

==== 1980 Bledisloe Cup Test Series ====
Following the 1980 Australia rugby union tour of Fiji, Poidevin played in six consecutive matches against New Zealand – for Australian Universities, Sydney, NSW and in three Tests for the Wallabies.

Poidevin played in the first match of the 1980 New Zealand rugby union tour of Australia and Fiji for Sydney against New Zealand, which was drawn 13–13. Shortly thereafter he played for New South Wales against New Zealand in the All Blacks' fifth match of the tour. New Zealand won the game 12–4.

Poidevin played in Australia's first Test of the 1980 Bledisloe Cup against New Zealand, won 13–9 by the Wallabies. Australia lost the second Test 12–9, in which Poidevin sustained a cut on his face after being rucked across the head by All Black Gary Knight.

Poidevin played for Australian Universities in New Zealand's 10th match of the tour, which was lost 33–3.

However, Poidevin played in the third and deciding Test of the 1980 Bledisloe Cup – his sixth consecutive match played against New Zealand in 1980 – won 26–10.

The series victory over New Zealand in 1980 was the first time Australia had ever retained the Bledisloe Cup, which they had won in 1979 in a one-off Test. It was the first three-Test series victory Australia had ever achieved over New Zealand since 1949, and the first three-Test series they had won against New Zealand on Australian soil since 1934.

=== 1981 ===
In 1981, Poidevin toured Japan with the Australian Universities rugby union team. Australian Universities won four games against Japan's university teams, but lost the final game against All Japan by one point.

==== Sydney ====
Following his brief tour of Japan, Poidevin was selected for the Sydney team to play against a World XV that included players such as New Zealand's Bruce Robertson, Hika Reid and Andy Haden, Wales' Graham Price, Argentina's Alejandro Iachetti and Hugo Porta and Australia's Mark Loane. The game ended in a 16–16 draw.

Following this match Sydney undertook a procession of representative games that included playing Queensland at Ballymore. Sydney's unbeaten streak of 14 games was broken by Queensland after they defeated Sydney 30–4, scoring four tries. Sydney then lost to New Zealand side Canterbury before responding by defeating Auckland and NSW Country – both games were played at Redfern Oval.

==== New South Wales ====
Poidevin was then selected to play for New South Wales in a succession of the matches in 1981. The first match against Manawatu was won 58–3, with NSW scoring 10 tries. Victories over Waikato and Counties followed, before New South Wales were defeated by Queensland 26–15 at the Sydney Cricket Ground. New South Wales played Queensland in a return match a week later in Brisbane that was won 7–6.

==== 1981 France rugby union tour of Australia ====
Poidevin played for Sydney against France in the third game France played for their 1981 France rugby union tour of Australia, won by Sydney 16–14. Poidevin then played for New South Wales against France for the fifth match of France's Australia tour, lost 21–12.

Poidevin achieved national selection for the two-Test series against France, despite competition for back row positions in the Australian team. The first Test against France marked the first time Poidevin played with Australian eighthman Mark Loane and contained the first try Poidevin scored at international Test level. In his biography, For Love Not Money, written with Jim Webster, Poidevin recalls that:

The first France Test at Ballymore held special significance for me because I was playing alongside Loaney for the first time. In my eyes he was something of a god... Loaney was a huge inspiration, and I tailed him around the field hoping to feed off him whenever he made one of those titanic bursts where he’d split the defence wide open with his unbelievable strength and speed.
Sticking to him in that Test paid off handsomely, because Loaney splintered the Frenchmen in one charge, gave to me and I went for the line for all I was worth. I saw Blanco coming at me out of the corner of my eye, but was just fast enough to make the corner for my first Test try. I walked back with the whole of the grandstand yelling and cheering. God and Loaney had been good to me."

Poidevin played in Australia's second Test against France in Sydney, won by Australia 24–14, giving Australia a 2–0 series victory.

==== 1981–82 Australia rugby union tour of Britain and Ireland ====
In mid-August 1981 the ARFU held trials to choose a team for the 1981–82 Australia rugby union tour of Britain and Ireland. However, Poidevin was unavailable for these trials after breaking his thumb in a second division club game for the University of New South Wales against Drummoyne. Despite missing the trials, Poidevin still obtained selection for the Seventh Wallabies to tour the Home Nations.

Poidevin played in 13 matches of the 24-game tour, which included all four Tests and provincial matches against Munster (lost 15–6) and North and Midlands (won 36–6).

Poidevin played in Australia's Test victory over Ireland, won 16–12 (Australia's only victory on tour). Australia lost the second Test on tour against Wales 18–13 in what Poidevin later described as "one of the greatest disappointments I've experienced in Rugby." The Wallabies then lost their third Test on tour against Scotland 24–15. The final Test against England was lost 15–11.

=== 1982 ===
==== Randwick ====
Poidevin commenced 1982 by switching Sydney club teams, leaving the University of New South Wales for Randwick. In For Love Not Money, Poidevin explained that, "University of NSW had spent the previous two seasons in second division and I very much wanted to play my future club football each week at an ultra-competitive level, so that there wasn’t that huge jump I used to experience going from club to representative ranks." Shortly thereafter Poidevin played in the first Australian club championship between Randwick and Brothers, opposing his former Australian captain Tony Shaw. Randwick won the game 22–13.

Later in the year, Poidevin won his first Sydney premiership with Randwick in their 21–12 victory over Warringah, in which Poidevin scored two tries.

==== Sydney ====
In 1982, Poidevin played rugby union for Sydney under new coach Peter Fenton after Peter Crittle was elevated to coach of New South Wales. Poidevin commenced Sydney's 1982 rugby season with warm-up watches against Victoria and the ACT, before travelling to Fiji, where New South Wales defeated Fiji 21–18. A week later, Sydney defeated Queensland 25–9. The Queensland side featured many players who had played (or would play) for the Wallabies – Stan Pilecki, Duncan Hall, Mark Loane, Tony Shaw, Michael Lynagh, Michael O'Connor, Brendan Moon, Andrew Slack, and Paul McLean. Poidevin was then named captain of Sydney for their next game against NSW Country (won 43–3), after Sydney captain Michael Hawker withdrew with an injury.

In 1982, Scotland toured Australia and lost their third provincial game to Sydney 22–13. However, Poidevin's autobiography does not state whether he played in that game.

==== New South Wales ====
Poidevin continued to play for New South Wales in 1982, and travelled to New Zealand for a three-match tour with the team now coached by former Wallaby Peter Crittle and containing a new manager – future Australian coach Alan Jones. New South Wales won their first match against Waikato 43–21, their second match against Taranaki 14–9, and their third and final match against Manawatu 40–13.

Following the tour to New Zealand, Sydney played in a match against a World XV. However, because several European players withdrew, the World XV's forward pack was composed mainly of New Zealand forwards, including Graham Mourie, Andy Haden, Billy Bush and Hika Reid. Sydney won the game 31–13 with several of its players sustaining injuries. Poidevin was severely rucked across the forehead in the game and required several stitches to conceal the wound he sustained. All Black Andy Haden was later confronted by Poidevin at the post-match reception, where he denied culpability. Poidevin would later write that, "All evidence then seemed to point to [Billy] Bush, who was the other prime suspect. But years later Mourie told me that he had been shocked at the incident and, being captain, he spoke to Haden about it at the time. Haden's response? He accused the captain of getting soft." Public calls were made for an injury into the incident, with NSW manager Alan Jones a prominent advocate for Poidevin. However, no action was taken. Poidevin would later write that with examination of videos and judiciary committees "the culprit(s) concerned would have spent a very long time out of the game."

Following NSW's game against the World XV, the team was set to play two interstate games against Queensland – both scheduled to be played in Queensland to celebrate the Queensland Rugby Union's centenary year. Queensland won the first game 23–16. Following an injury to New South Wales captain Mark Ella in the first game, Poidevin was made captain of the team for the first time in his career for the second game, lost 41–7 to Queensland.

Following the interstate series against Queensland, Scotland toured Australia, playing two Tests. With eightman Mark Loane likely to be selected for the Australian team, Poidevin was faced with strong competition for the remaining two back row positions at breakaway, with Tony Shaw, Gary Pearse, Peter Lucas and Chris Roche, all vying for national selection.

Prior to New South Wales' provincial game against Scotland, a newspaper headline read "Poidevin Needs a Blinder". Scotland defeated New South Wales 31–7, and Poidevin missed out on national selection, with newly appointed Australian coach Bob Dwyer selecting Queenslanders Chris Roche and Tony Shaw for the remaining back row positions. This was the first time Poidevin was dropped from the Australia team.

==== 1982 Bledisloe Cup Series ====
After missing out on national selection for the two-Test series against Scotland, Poidevin regained his spot in the Australian side for the 1982 Australia rugby union tour of New Zealand, after 10 Australian players (nine of them from Queensland) announced that for professional and personal reasons they were withdrawing from the tour.

The Australian side surprised rugby pundits with their early success, winning all five provincial games in the lead-up to the first Test. However, Australia lost the first Test to New Zealand 23–16 in Christchurch. Poidevin would later remark that: "Out on the field it felt like a real flogging, and personally I'd been well outplayed by their skipper Graham Mourie, a player of great intelligence and an inspiring leader."

Australia won the second Test 19–16 in what Poidevin would later call "one of the most courageous victories by any of the Australian sides with which I've been associated." Australia held a 19–3 halftime lead. From there, Poidevin recalled that:

Then we hung on against a massive All Black finishing effort. The harder they came at us, the more determinedly we cut them down in their tracks. We were desperate and we fought desperately. In the last 30 seconds of the game, I dived onto a loose ball and the All Blacks swarmed over me and Peter Lucas and we knew that if the ball went back out way we'd win the Test, and when Luco and I saw it heading back outside we actually started laughing with joy. We all began embracing and congratulating each other in highly emotional scenes. Against all odds, we'd beaten the All Blacks and suddenly had a chance to retain the Bledisloe Cup.

However, Australia would go on to lose the third and series-deciding Test to the All Blacks 33–18. Despite this, the tour was deemed a success for Australia, with the team scoring 316 points, including 47 tries on tour.

Following the tour, Poidevin played in another Queensland Rugby Union centenary game between the Barbarians and Queensland.

=== 1983 ===
==== 1983 Australia rugby union tour of Italy and France ====
Poidevin was a member of the Wallabies for the 1983 Australia rugby union tour of Italy and France. Australia won their opening tour game against Italy B in L'Aquila 26–0, before travelling to Padua for the first Test on tour against Italy, won 29–7.

Australia won its first provincial game on the French leg of a tour, a 19–16 victory over a French selection XV in Strasbourg. However, Poidevin would later describe it as 'the most vicious game I've ever been part of.' The Wallabies drew the next game against French Police at Le Creusot, and then defeated another French selection side 27–7 at Grenoble. However, after remaining undefeated up until this point of the tour, Australia then lost two matches – a 15–9 defeat to a French Selection XV at Perpignan and a 36–6 loss to a French Selection XV at Agen.

Australia drew its first Test against France at Clermont-Ferrand 15–15. In For Love Not Money, Poidevin remembered that:

The first Test at Clermont-Ferrand produced a tremendously gutsy performance by Australia. We were literally so short on lineout jumpers that it was decided I should jump at number two in the lineouts against Lorieux. Well at the first lineout he had one look across at me and simply laughed. I had no hope of matching him, so I just tried knocking him sideways out of every lineout.
The team put up a determined effort in a Test which never rose to any heights. It was tight, unattractive and closely fought, and at the finish we managed a very satisfying 15-all draw.

Australia's back row of Poidevin, Chris Roche and Steve Tuynman received positive reviews for its performance in the first Test against the French back row, which included Jean-Pierre Rives.

Australia then won its next provincial match against French Army 16–10.

France defeated Australia in the second Test 15–6, giving them a 1–0–1 series victory over the Wallabies. In For Love Not Money, Poidevin documented that:

That Test was an excellent defensive effort by the Australian team. The French won so much possession it wasn't funny, and they came at us in wave after wave. But we cut them down time and again. How we held them out as much as we did I'll never know. It was another vicious game. I was kicked in the head early on and walked around in a daze for a while...
We had the chance to win the game. We were down only 9–6 when our hooker Tom Lawton was penalised in a scrum five metres from the French line for an early strike and the Frogs were out of trouble. Mark Ella also had a drop goal attempt charged down by Rives late in the game. Finally the French pulled off a blindside move, scored a remarkable try, and won 15–6.

Poidevin concluded the 1983 Australia rugby union tour of Italy and France in the Wallabies' 23–21 victory against the French Barbarians, in what he described as 'the most exciting game on tour.'

=== 1984 ===
In 1984, Australia coach Bob Dwyer was challenged by Manly coach Alan Jones for the position of national coach. Poidevin publicly supported Dwyer's reelection as national coach. However, on 24 February 1984, Jones replaced Dwyer as head of the Australia national team. Despite this, Poidevin would go on to become one of Jones' greatest supporters and loyal players. In For Love Not Money, Poidevin wrote of Jones that:

While Tempo (Bob Templeton) and Dwyer were leaders in their field in specific areas, Jonesy was undoubtedly the master coach and the best I've ever played under. He was a freak. Australian Rugby was very fortunate to have had a person with his extraordinary ability to coach our national team. New Zealand's Fred Allen and the British Lions' Carwyn James are probably the other most remarkable coaches of modern times. But given Alan Jones' skills in so many areas, and his record, probably no other rugby nation in the world has had anyone quite like him, and perhaps none ever will.

==== Sydney ====
Poidevin commenced his 1984 season in March by captaining a 23-man Sydney team for a six-match tour of Italy, France, England, Wales and Ireland. This was the second time the Sydney rugby team had undertaken a major tour, the first since 1977. Poidevin played throughout the tour with a broken finger, which he had sustained before departing from Australia. Sydney won the first game against the Zebre Invitation XV at Livorno in Italy, then won the second match against Toulon 25–18 at Toulon, and narrowly lost to Brive. In Great Britain, Sydney defeated a Brixham XV at Brixham, lost to Swansea by eight points in Swansea, and lost to Ulster 19–16 after leading them 16–0 at halftime. In For Love Not Money, lamented his debut performances captaining a representative rugby team:

...if I were able to relive that time over again, then I feel I might have become captain of Australia a lot sooner and remained in the role a lot longer. It was a terrific opportunity for to show just that I had to offer as the captain of representative teams, but I blew it.
How? Andy Conway was a terrific manager because of his efficiency and high standards, but he was a born worrier. Our coach Peter (Fab) Fenton was another fantastic bloke and very knowledgeable about rugby, but hardly the most organised or toughest coach you'd ever meet. It meant that I felt in the unfortunate position of having to both set and impose the discipline on the players on what was going to be a fairly demanding tour. And that task became very onerous to me. We also had several new young players in the team, and they needed help to fit into the way of a touring team. I had the added problem of having broken a finger before leaving and spent the whole of the tour in a fair bit of pain, which wasn't helped by the extremely cold weather we encountered. Personal problems at home also added to this dangerous cocktail.
All these factors added up to my not be able to give the captaincy role the complete attention it required. I wasn't nearly as good as I should have been and I daresay that some of the players returned from the tour with fairly mixed feelings about my leadership qualities. And I've no doubt that the Manly players in the team who had Jones's ear would have told him so too.

Later in the year, during the 1984 New Zealand rugby union tour of Australia, and after Australia's first Test victory over New Zealand, controversy arose when eight Sydney players were withdrawn from New Zealand's tour match against Sydney – Poidevin, Phillip Cox, Mark Ella, Michael Hawker, Ross Reynolds, Steve Williams, Steve Cutler and Topo Rodriguez. This decision drew criticism from the Sydney Rugby Union and its coach Peter Fenton. However, Poidevin was not allowed to play in Sydney's game against the All Blacks, lost 28–3.

==== Randwick ====
After playing through the Sydney rugby club's 1984 European tour with a broken finger, Poidevin had surgery on his broken finger before returning to his first game for Randwick in 1984 on 19 May, playing against Sydney University in a match where he scored two tries.

==== 1984 Australia rugby union tour of Fiji ====
Poidevin's national representative season for the Wallabies commenced on the 1984 Australia rugby union tour of Fiji. He played in the Wallabies' first tour game – a 19–3 victory against Western XV at Churchill Park. He was then rested for the second match against the Eastern Selection XV at National Stadium, which Australia won 15–4. He then played in Australia's single Test on tour, a 16–3 victory over Fiji. In For Love Not Money, Poidevin recalled that:

Australia won the Test in pretty foul conditions by 16–3. Heavy rain had made it hard going under foot, but we played very controlled rugby against the Fijians, who really find the tight XV-a-side game too much for them. They much prefer loose, broken play when their natural exuberance takes over and then they can play brilliantly. Afterwards, the Fijian media singled out the full-back and one of the wingers and blatantly accused them of having lost the Test – a type of reporting you don't normally see elsewhere in the world. But it wasn't the fault of any of the Fijian players. In fact, our forward effort that afternoon in difficult conditions was outstanding, and Mark Ella also had a terrific game. He kicked a field goal that many of the Fijian players disputed, but the referee Graham Harrison thought it was okay and that's all that mattered. Mark also set up a brilliant try, involving Lynagh and Moon and eventually scored by Campese, who was playing full-back.

==== New South Wales ====
Following the 1984 Australia rugby union tour of Fiji, Poidevin was among several New South Wales players who declined to go on the Waratahs 1984 three-match tour to New Zealand. However, following this tour he played for New South Wales against Queensland at Ballymore in a game the Waratahs lost 13–3. Poidevin then played for New South Wales against the All Blacks in New Zealand's second game of the 1984 New Zealand rugby union tour of Australia, which the Waratahs lost 37–10.

==== 1984 Bledisloe Cup ====
Poidevin played in all three Tests of the 1984 Bledisloe Cup Test Series against New Zealand, which the Wallabies lost 2–1. Australia defeated New Zealand 16–9 in the first Test on 21 July 1984 at the Sydney Cricket Ground. Poidevin would later write that: 'We won 16–9, scoring two tries to nil before 40,797 spectators... Cuts absolutely dominated the game, and I tremendously enjoyed my role of minder behind him in the lineouts, which we won 25–16. With all that ball, everything else fell into place and Andrew Slack later described the way Australia played as the most disciplined performance he'd ever been involved in.' However, New Zealand would rebound from their first Test loss to win the second Test 19–15. Poidevin documented that:

The All Blacks won 19–15 after we'd been ahead 12–0. At the end of the day we'd lost the lineouts 25–12. The reason for that was Cuts being wiped out early by an All Black boot. Take away all the possession that he always provided and we weren't the same outfit. Despite our planning, Robbie Deans also did the job for the All Blacks in goalkicking, because while we scored a try apiece he potted five penalty goals to provide the difference. There were plenty of post-mortems, but basically it was a highly motivated New Zealand team that really pulled itself back from Death Row.

Australia would go on to lose the third and series-deciding Test to New Zealand, 25–24. In For Love Not Money, Poidevin remembered that:

As has happened so many times in our nations' Test clashes, there was only one point in the result. It was 25–24... their way. Before a massive crowd of almost 50,000, the All Blacks scored two tries to one, including a very easy one conceded by us. There were 26 penalties in the Test, nineteen to Australia, a remarkable statistic. Yet again Deans kicked six goals from seven attempts, which gave them the narrowest of winning margins and also the Cup. We had problems that day in the back line, with Mark Ella calling the shots at five-eighth and Hawker and Slack in the centres. All were senior players, and there was an unbelievable amount of talk between them during the game – far too much. Each seemed to have different ideas... The Australian forwards did extremely well, but our backs, with all their talent, simply got themselves into a horrible mess.

However, Poidevin later concluded that: 'We were all deeply distressed at losing a series to New Zealand by a single point in the decider, but it certainly strengthened our resolve to succeed on the forthcoming tour of the British Isles. We were really going to make amends over there.'

==== 1984 Grand Slam ====
Poidevin toured with the Eighth Wallabies for the 1984 Australia rugby union tour of Britain and Ireland that won rugby union's "grand slam", the first Australian side to defeat all four home nations, England, Ireland, Wales and Scotland, on a tour. Poidevin scored four tries from 10 tour games, which included all four Test matches and the tour-closing match against the Barbarians, for a total of 16 points on tour.

Poidevin played in Australia's first match on tour against London Counties at Twickenham, which the Wallabies won 22–3. He was then rested for the second tour match against South and South West, drawn 12–12. He played in the third tour match against Cardiff. In For Love Not Money he wrote that: 'Cardiff are one of the great rugby clubs of the world and to draw them so early in the tour presented us with a huge hurdle. It was all deadly serious stuff during the build-up to that game...' Terry Cooper reported that: "Cardiff went clear at 16–0 after 61 minutes when [Gareth] Davies swept home a 20-metre penalty. By then, solid rain had begun to sweep the ground and Cardiff were forced to replace flanker Gareth Roberts with Robert Lakin. Davies' penalty was correctly awarded following a late tackle by Simon Poidevin. Davies stood up, shook himself down and landed the goal." The Wallabies went on to lose to Cardiff 16–12. Poidevin played in the fourth match on tour against Combined Services, won 55–9. He was then rested for the fifth match on tour against Swansea, which the Wallabies won 17–7 after the match had to be prematurely abandoned due to a blackout with 12 minutes remaining in the game.

Poidevin played in the first Test of the Grand Slam tour against England, beating Chris Roche for the remaining back row position. Australia defeated England 19–3. The Wallabies were level with England at 3–3 at halftime. However, Australia scored three second half tries – the last scored by Poidevin. In For Love Not Money Poidevin remembered that: ‘For the last of our three tries I was tailing Campese down the touchline like a faithful sheepdog when he tossed me an overhead pass and over I went to score the Twickenham try every kid dreams of.’ Terry Cooper reported Poidevin's try in Victorious Wallabies:

Australia sealed their victory with three minutes remaining. An England move broke down. Gould grabbed the ball and a long, long infield pass fell at Ella's toes.
Ella stooped forward, plucked the ball off the turf without breaking stride and sent Campese on a characteristic diagonal run. Campese sprinted 40 metres and seemed set to score, but Underwood did well to block him out. It did not matter. Campese merely fed the ball inside to Simon Poidevin – backing up perfectly, and not for the last time on tour – who nonchalantly strolled over the English line.

In Path to Victory Terry Smith further gave a depiction of the play that led to Poidevin's try:

The best try was the last, by Simon Poidevin. Picking up a loose pass under pressure, Gould fired a long, long pass to Ella, who somehow managed to pick it up at toenail height. In the same movement he sent David Campese away down the left wing. When challenged by the cover, Campese flicked an overhead pass to Poidevin, who was tailing faithfully on the inside. Poidevin strolled nonchalantly over the line to touch down on the hallowed Twickenham turf. Lynagh converted to make the final score 19–3.

Poidevin was rested for Australia's seven-match on tour against Midlands Division, which Australia won 21–18.

Poidevin played in Australia's second Test on tour against Ireland, won 16–9. In For Love Not Money Poidevin documented a mistake that he made which nearly cost the Wallabies the match:

Again we won against the very committed Irish, this time by 16–9, although it would have been more had muggings not thrown the most hopeless forward pass to Matthew Burke, with the unattended goal-line screaming for a try. It was a blunder of classic proportions. Campo made a sensational midfield break, gave to me and Burke loomed up alongside me with their fullback Hugo MacNeill the only guy to beat. Burke was on my right, my bad passing side, and as I drew MacNeill I somehow threw the ball forward to him. I could only bury my head in my hands with despair. Didn’t I feel bad about it, especially as Ireland went on to lead 9–6 for a while, and I imagined my blunder costing us the Test. But when it was all over, we had two wins from two Tests: halfway to the Grand Slam.

In Running Rugby Mark Ella described this movement which ended in Poidevin's forward pass:

Mark Ella receives the ball from a lineout against Ireland in 1984 and prepares to pass to Michael Lynagh. Lynagh shapes to pass it to the outside-centre Andrew Slack... but instead slips it to David Campese in a switch play... Note that Lynagh has run at the slanting angle across the field which a switch play requires... Campese accelerates through a gap which the Irish number 8 has allowed to open by not moving across quickly enough. This Australian move had an unhappy ending. Campese passed to Simon Poidevin, who, with only the Irish fullback to beat, threw a forward pass to Matt Burke running in support, aborting a certain try.

In The Top 100 Wallabies (2004) Poidevin told rugby writer Peter Jenkins that: 'I remember blowing a try against Ireland when I threw a forward pass to Matt Burke. I still worry about that.

Poidevin was rested for Australia's ninth match on tour against Ulster, lost 16–9. Poidevin returned to the Australian team for its 10th match on tour, a 31–19 victory over Munster in which he scored his second try on tour. Terry Cooper documented that: 'Ward kicked two late penalties, but in between Simon Poidevin, on hand as always, scored Australia's third try, which had been made possible by Ella's sinuous running.' Poidevin would later remark that, 'Our forwards display was probably our best in a non-Test match.' He was then rested, along with most of the starting Test side, for the Wallabies' 12th game of tour, a 19–16 loss to Llanelli.

Poidevin played in the Wallabies' third Test on tour, defeating Wales, won 28–9, during which he delivered the final pass for a Michael Lynagh try by linking with David Campese and was involved in a famous pushover try.

In The Top 100 Wallabies Poidevin recalled that: "But in the next Test against Wales I threw probably my best pass ever for Michael Lynagh to score." Peter Jenkins in Wallaby Gold: The History of Australian Test Rugby documented that: "Farr-Jones helped create another try by using the short side. Campese made a superb run, Poidevin backed up and Lynagh touched down." Terry Smith in Path to Victory wrote that: "Lynagh's second try came after Farr-Jones again escaped up the blind side from a scrum to set up a dazzling break by David Campese. Simon Poidevin's backing up didn't happen by accident either. He always tries to trail Campese on the inside. Terry Cooper also depicted Poidevin's role in Lynagh's try in Victorious Wallabies:

Australia's second try also came from a blind-side break. Farr-Jones again escaped after a scrum and he gave Campese room to move. The winger took off on a spectacular diagonal run towards the Welsh goal. His speed and unexpected direction created a massive overlap. The Welsh suddenly looked as though they had only ten players in action and all Australia had to do was to transfer the ball carefully. They did so. Campese to Poidevin and then on to Lynagh, who scored between the posts."

In For Love Not Money Poidevin recalled the Wallabies's performance, and documented the famous pushover try:

After only five minutes I knew we were going to beat Wales and beat them well: they just didn't have any answer to the way we were playing. The Welsh players told us afterwards that when they tried to shove the first scrum of the game and were pushed back two metres they immediately knew the writing was on the wall. Yet all the media had focused on in the lead-up to the Test was how the power of the Welsh scrum would prove the Wallabies' downfall.
As Alan Jones said later, for the first 23 minutes of the Test we didn't make a single mistake in our match plan. Everything was flowing our way and the Test was ours long before it was over. The real highlight came 22 minutes into the second half. Australia were leading 13–3. The call of 'Samson' went out from our hooker Tommy Lawton as the two packs went down within the shadow of the Welsh line. It was the call for an eight-man shove. All feet back. Spines ramrod straight. Every muscle tense and ready. The ball came in, we all sank and heaved with everything we had and then like a mountainside disintegrating under gelignite the Welsh scrum began yielding unwillingly. As we slowly drove them back over their own goal-line I watched under my left arm as Steve (Bird) Tuynman released his grasp on the second-rowers and dropped into the tangle. The Bird knew what he was doing, and the referee Mr E E Doyle was perfectly positioned to award what has since been legendary, our pushover try. The stands went into shock. The Arms Park had never seen such humiliation. We went on to a fantastic 28–9 win and had an equally fabulous happy hour afterwards.

Following the Test against Wales, Poidevin was rested for the Wallabies' next match against Northern Division, which they won 19–12. Poidevin would later write that, "This was one of the better teams we'd seen on tour, and included Rob Andrew at five-eighth." However, Jones selected Poidevin for the next match, the Wallabies' 14th game on tour, a 9–6 loss to South of Scotland. However, Poidevin and the entire starting Test team was then rested for the 15th match on tour, a 26–12 victory over Glasgow.

Poidevin played in Australia's fourth and final Test on tour, a 37–12 victory over Scotland, giving the Wallabies their first ever Grand Slam.

He was then rested for the Wallabies's 17th match on tour against Pontypool, before playing in the tour-closing game against the Barbarians. He scored two tries in the game against the Barbarians. Terry Cooper reported that: "Lynagh converted and added the points to a try by Simon Poidevin, who was put in following a loop between Ella and Slack and hard running by Lynagh." Poidevin also scored a second try in the last 10 minutes of the game, which was won 37–30.

In For Love Not Money, Poidevin paid tribute to the 1984 Grand Slam Wallabies by writing that:

It was easily the best rugby team I'd ever been associated with. Four years beforehand when we won the Bledisloe Cup we had some fantastic backs, but for a complete team from front to back this outfit was almost faultless. There was nothing they couldn't do. We would play open attacking rugby, as shown by the record number of tries we scored, or else percentage stuff when we needed to. And our defence throughout the tour was almost impregnable. It was the complete side.

=== 1985 ===
==== Australia ====
Poidevin commenced the 1985 international season with the Wallabies with a two-Test series against Canada. Australia defeated Canada 59–3 in the first Test and 43–15 in the second Test. In For Love Not Money Poidevin recollected that, "Australia copped a fair amount of criticism for their play, but this really was unnecessary because you couldn't have asked for a more disciplined performance than our first Test win."

Poidevin then played with the Wallabies for the one-off Bledisloe Cup Test against the All Blacks. Australia was without several players from their 1984 Grand Slam Tour. Mark Ella and Andrew Slack had retired (Slack would come out of retirement in 1986) and David Campese was injured. The Wallabies lost to the All Blacks 10–9. In For Love Not Money Poidevin recounted that:

Unfortunately, the All Blacks again won by a point, 10–9. The referee David Burnett awarded 25 penalties, which meant the Test never flowed. You felt paralysed, you just couldn't do anything. It was also a game where there was so much at stake that neither team was prepared to take any risks. Again the Australian forwards played extremely well. The All Black captain Andy Dalton later paid us the compliment of saying it was the hardest pack he'd ever played against. That's a very big rap. The scoring was low because the kickers were both off-target. Crowley missed six from eight attempts and Lynagh five from seven. The move which finally sank us was one they called the Bombay Duck. It really caught us napping.
We were leading at the time, when they took a tap-kick 70 metres from our line, halfback David Kirk went the blindside and linked up with a few more before left-winger Craig Green dashed 35 metres for the match-winning try. Our cover defence wasn't in the right position and we never had any hope of stopping them. We did remarkably well up front but missed several golden opportunities to pull the Test out of the fire. Tommy Lawton and Andy McIntyre both dropped balls close to the line. The one-point difference at the end was the second successive Test they'd won by the narrowest of margins, as the third Test in 1984 went New Zealand's way 25–24.

More than a month following the Bledisloe Cup Test loss, Poidevin played in Australia's two-Test series against Fiji, which Australia won 2–0. The first Test was won 52–28 and the second Test was won 31–9.

In For Love Not Money Poidevin criticised the Australian Rugby Union for not capitalising upon the marketing opportunities opened up by the success of the 1984 Grand Slam Wallabies.

But when all was said and done, the Australian public hadn't received much value for money that season. They'd not had the chance at first-hand to see the Grand Slam Wallabies at full throttle, and in this regard the Australian Rugby Football Union had done a woeful marketing job of the team. They could have made a fortune ditching us in against better opposition than that. Instead, the ARFU faced a six-figure loss on these nothing tours by Canada and the extremely disappointing Fijian team.

=== 1986 ===
At the commencement of the Wallabies' 1986 season, Poidevin came into contention for the Australian captaincy. The Wallabies captain for 1985, Steve Williams, had decided to retire from international rugby to concentrate on his stock-broking career. However, Andrew Slack, the captain of the 1984 Grand Slam Wallabies, had decided to come out of retirement and play international rugby, causing a dilemma within the Australian side. Alan Jones approached Poidevin for his thoughts on the situation. In For Love Not Money Poidevin wrote that: 'I certainly didn't lack ambition to captain Australia, but Slacky had been such a tremendous captain that my initial feelings were that if he wanted the job again then he should have it although this effectively put a hold on my own captaincy aspirations for another season.'

==== Rugby sevens ====
In March, Poidevin played in the World Sevens at Concord Oval. Australia was defeated by New Zealand 32–0 in the final. The final was the first time that Poidevin would oppose Buck Shelford, in what would be the beginning of a fierce rivalry between the two men. In For Love Not Money Poidevin remembered that:

It was a tremendously physical game and was marred by Glen Ella being elbowed in the head by Wayne Shelford. It was the first time I’d come up against this character and to say I didn’t like his approach was putting it mildly. I was sickened by what he did to my Randwick clubmate and simply couldn’t contain myself. Within a minute of his clobbering Glen I got into a stouch with him and we finished up rolling around on the ground in front of the packed main grandstand, not only in front of Premier Neville Wran but in front of a far more important person – my mother. While we were grappling I thought to myself ‘we really shouldn’t be doing this’, but my blood was boiling after the Ella incident.

Poidevin then participated in the Hong Kong Sevens where Australia were knocked out in the semi-final by the French Barbarians. He would later reflect: "I thought my own play was diabolical. They scored a couple of easy tries early on through what I felt was my lax defence." He further added: "I was pretty chopped up after that loss, particularly as I'd been very keen to make the final so that I could have another crack at the New Zealanders."

==== 1986 IRB-sanctioned team ====
In 1986, Poidevin travelled to the United Kingdom for two matches commemorating the centenary of the International Rugby Board (IRB) featuring players from around the world. Poidevin was selected along with fellow Wallabies Andrew Slack, Steve Cutler, Nick Farr-Jones, Tom Lawton, Roger Gould, Steve Tuynman, Michael Lynagh and Topo Rodriguez for the two-match celebration.

The first match Poidevin participated in was playing for a World XV (dubbed "The Rest") containing players from Australia, New Zealand, South Africa and France to be coached by Brian Lochore, that played against the British Lions, after the Lions 1986 tour to South Africa had been cancelled. The World XV contained:

15. Serge Blanco (France), 14. John Kirwan (New Zealand), 13. Andrew Slack (Australia), 12. Michael Lynagh (Australia), 11. Patrick Estève (France), 10. Wayne Smith (New Zealand), 9. Nick Farr-Jones (Australia), 8. Murray Mexted (New Zealand), 7. Simon Poidevin (Australia), 6. Mark Shaw (New Zealand), 5. Burger Geldenhuys (South Africa), 4. Steve Cutler (Australia), 3. Gary Knight (New Zealand), 2. Tom Lawton (Australia), 1. Enrique Rodríguez (Australia).

The World XV won the match 15–7, in which Poidevin scored a try after taking an inside pass from Serge Blanco. In For Love Not Money, Poidevin remembered that:

The day before the game we had team photographs taken and I was joking around with Blanco about how I could picture us combining for this really spectacular try. ‘Serge, tomorrow this try will happen. It will be Blanco to Poidevin, Poidevin to Blanco, Blanco to Poidevin and he scores in the corner.’ Blow me down if we didn’t win the game 15–7 and I scored virtually a repeat of this imaginary try. The French full-back hit the line going like an express train, tossed the ball to Patrick Estève, then it came back to Blanco and he tossed it inside for me to score. The pair of us could hardly stop laughing walking back to the halfway line for the restart of play.

The second match was the Five Nations XV v Overseas Unions XV. The Overseas Unions XV was a team composed of players from the three major Southern Hemisphere rugby-playing nations – Australia, New Zealand and South Africa. The Overseas Unions XV team contained:

15. Roger Gould (Australia), 14. John Kirwan (New Zealand), 13. Danie Gerber (South Africa), 12. Warwick Taylor (New Zealand), 11. Carel du Plessis (South Africa), 10. Naas Botha (South Africa), 9. Dave Loveridge (New Zealand), 8. Steve Tuynman (Australia), 7. Simon Poidevin (Australia), 6. Mark Shaw (New Zealand), 5. Andy Haden (New Zealand), 4. Steve Cutler (Australia), 3. Gary Knight (New Zealand), 2. Andy Dalton (New Zealand), 1. Enrique Rodríguez (Australia)

The Overseas Unions XV defeated the Five Nations XV 32–13. John Mason, of The Daily Telegraph in London, reported: "Here was a forthright exercise of deeply-rooted skills of an uncanny mix of athleticism and aggression which permitted the overseas unions of the southern hemisphere to thrash the Five Nations of the northern hemisphere in a manner as stylish as it was merciless."

During the IRB centenary celebration matches, Poidevin discovered from his New Zealand teammates that they were planning to travel from London to South Africa for a rebel tour against South Africa following the Five Nations XV v Overseas Unions XV match. After it was revealed that All Blacks breakaway Jock Hobbs may not be able to join the tour after suffering a concussion, All Blacks Andy Haden and Murray Mexted approached Poidevin and asked him if he would be willing to join them in South Africa as a member of the New Zealand Cavaliers if Hobbs had to withdraw. Poidevin gave the All Blacks players his contact details, but Hobbs ultimately played on the tour and Poidevin was never contacted.

In For Love Not Money Poidevin reflected that: "What an experience it would have been! I chuckled a few times imagining myself not just playing alongside four or five All Blacks but being one-out in the whole All Black team. Alas, the invitation never came…

==== Randwick ====
Following New South Wales’ loss in the return interstate match against Queensland, Poidevin was asked to stand-by as a reserve for a game Randwick played against Parramatta at Granville Park. Poidevin came on to replace Randwick flanker John Maxwell during the match, but had to leave the field less than a minute after he entered the game after a head-on collision with Randwick teammate Brett Dooley and left him bleeding profusely. He would later say, "as far as rugby injuries go, it was easily the worst I've had".

==== New South Wales ====
Poidevin was appointed captain of the New South Wales Waratahs in 1986 for the inaugural South Pacific Championship. He captained the side to victories over Fiji (50–10) and Queensland 18–12 at Concord Oval. However, Queensland defeated New South Wales in the return game at Ballymore following the Wallabies' first Test of 1986 against Italy.

==== Australia ====
Poidevin played in the Wallabies' first Test of the 1986 season against Italy (won 39–18) under the captaincy of Andrew Slack. In For Love Not Money Poidevin reflected upon having missed a chance to captain the Wallabies:

At that stage I was very much regretting having scuttled my own captaincy chances in my conversation with Jones earlier in the season. Had I been more ambitious and shown more eagerness when Jonesy had first asked me then perhaps it would have been me at the helm. What made it worse was that I had really enjoyed the leadership of both Sydney and NSW in the previous weeks. Slacky had even made the observation in a newspaper article that I'd come on 'in leaps and bounds' as far as leadership was concerned and that he wouldn’t be surprised if I was made Australian captain. Still, it was not to be, and under Slacky we beat the very determined Italians 39–18.

Poidevin played in the Wallabies' second Test of the 1986 season against France, who toured Australia as joint Five Nations champions. Australia defeated France 27–14, despite France scoring three tries to Australia's one. Poidevin would later call it "one of the most devastating performances by an Australian forward pack", adding that "our domination of territory and possession kept them right out of the Test." The Wallabies were later criticised by the Australian press for playing non-expansive rugby. Poidevin responded to these criticisms in For Love Not Money, writing that:

Test matches are all about winning for your team and your country and absolutely nothing else. Over the years we'd learned that the hard way. You can play great Test matches, be very entertaining and, at the end of the day, lose. And you'll be remembered as losers. We wanted to be remembered as winners. This Test was a classic example: we knew that the razzle-dazzle Frenchmen had the ability to run in tries against any team in the world, but all that shows for them in the history books that day is a big fat L for loss, with nothing about how attractively they played. Sure, at times we played percentage football against them, but it was far more important for us to win than to throw the ball about like they were doing and lose. And Jacques Fouroux would be the first to support this sentiment.

After the Test against France, with Andrew Slack making himself absent for Australia's 1986 two-Test series against Argentina, Poidevin was awarded the Australian captaincy for the first time in his career.

With Slacky missing from the series, words can't describe how happy I was when I was made Australian captain for the opening Test. I was absolutely overjoyed. It's a responsibility that deep down I'd always wanted; I felt that I'd served my apprenticeship for it and that my time had come. I’d have liked to earn the honour against more formidable opposition than the Pumas, but to lead Australia in any Test match had always been my big dream, so there was no prouder person in the world than me on 6 July 1986 when I led the boys onto Ballymore.

Australia won the two-Test series, winning the first Test 39–18 and the second Test 26–0, under Poidevin's captaincy.

==== 1986 Bledisloe Cup Series ====
Following Australia's domestic Tests in 1986 against Italy, France and Argentina, Poidevin toured with the Wallabies for the 1986 Australia rugby union tour of New Zealand. The 1986 Australia Wallabies became the second Australian rugby team to beat the All Blacks in New Zealand in a rugby union Test series. They are one of six rugby union sides to win a rugby Test series in New Zealand, along with the 1937 South African Springboks, the 1949 Australian Wallabies, the 1971 British Lions, the 1994 French touring side, and the 2022 Irish touring side.

Poidevin played in Australia's first Test against an All Blacks side dubbed the 'Baby Blacks', because several New Zealand players had been banned from playing in the first Test for participating in the rebel Cavaliers tour. The Wallabies defeated the All Blacks 13–12. He participated in the Wallabies' second Test against the All Blacks at Carisbrook Park. New Zealand was bolstered by the return of nine Cavaliers players to their side who didn't play in the first Test – Gary Knight, Hika Reid, Steve McDowell, Murray Pierce, Gary Whetton, Jock Hobbs, Allan Whetton, Warwick Taylor and Craig Green. The Wallabies lost the match 13–12 – the fourth consecutive Bledisloe Cup Test decided by a one-point margin. However, Australia rebounded to win the third Test 22–9 against New Zealand, winning the series 2–1. In For Love Not Money, Poidevin described the third Test, writing that:

The Eden Park Test was stunning. From the word go the All Blacks threw the ball around in madcap fashion. I couldn't believe their totally uncharacteristic tactics. I'd never seen them playing the game so openly. As we chased and tackled from one side of the field to the other it crossed my mind how grateful I was for all the grueling training Jonesy had put into us early in the tour. But the All Blacks had an epidemic of dropped passes in their abnormal approach, often when our defences were stretching paper-thin, and we took every advantage of that. When it was all over we had achieved a 22–9 victory, which to me was more satisfying and even greater than the Grand Slam success in Britain.

In For Love Not Money, first published before the 1991 Rugby World Cup, Poidevin called the 1986 Bledisloe Cup series victory the high point of his rugby career:

Year in and year out the All Blacks have been our most difficult opponents. I’ve been trampled by the best of them. New Zealanders are parochial about their teams and have every right to be proud of them. The French in France are extremely difficult to beat, but the All Blacks are totally uncompromising and the whole nation lives the game religiously. The game itself over there is not dirty, just extremely hard. They’re mostly big strapping country boys who won’t take any nonsense from anyone, and week after week they play some of the hardest provincial rugby in the world. Rucking is the lifeblood of their play. If you wind up on the wrong side of a ruck, you’ll finish the game bloodied or with your shorts, jerseys or socks peeled from your limbs by a hundred studs. Maybe I’m a masochist, but I somehow enjoy playing them. They are the greatest rugby team in the world, and to beat the All Blacks in New Zealand in a series as we did in 1986 is the ultimate in rugby.

Following Australia's Bledisloe Cup series victory over New Zealand, Greg Growden from The Sydney Morning Herald asked Poidevin what winning the series meant to him. He responded, ‘Now I can live life in peace.’

=== 1987 ===
==== Sevens ====
Poidevin commenced his 1987 rugby season by participating in the annual Hong Kong Sevens tournament in April. With Alan Jones as coach and David Campese as captain, Australia were defeated by Fiji in the semi-final, after trailing 14–0 after five minutes of play, before going on to lose 14–8.

Following the Hong Kong Sevens, Poidevin participated in the NSW Sevens at Concord Oval. Australia defeated Western Samoa, Korea and the Netherlands on the first day, before beating Tonga in the quarter-final and Korea in the semi-final. Australia then defeated New Zealand in the final 22–12, in what Poidevin later described as "one of the most satisfying and gutsy [victories] that I’ve been associated with in an Australian team."

==== New South Wales ====
During the 1987 Hong Kong Sevens Poidevin was informed via telex message that he had been removed as captain of the New South Wales team and replaced by Nick Farr-Jones by new coach Paul Dalton.

Following his removal as captain of New South Wales, Poidevin played in the 1987 South Pacific Championship. New South Wales won three of the tournament's five matches – a victory of Canterbury (25–24), an 19–18 loss to Auckland, a 23–20 victory of Fiji, a 40–15 win over Wellington, and a 17–6 loss to Queensland.

Following the 1987 Rugby World Cup, Poidevin played in one more match for New South Wales against Queensland at Concord Oval in Sydney, winning 21–19.

==== 1987 Rugby World Cup ====
Prior to the commencement of the 1987 Rugby World Cup, Poidevin played for the Wallabies in a preparatory match against Korea, won 65–18.

Shortly thereafter, he played in Australia's opening match of the 1987 Rugby World Cup against England, won 19–6. Afterwards, he was rested for Australia's second World Cup pool game against the United States. He returned for Australia's next pool match against Japan, his 43rd Test cap for Australia, giving him the record for most international Tests played for the Wallabies, surpassing the record previously held by Australia hooker Peter Johnson (1959–1971). Australia defeated Japan 42–23. To commemorate Poidevin breaking the record for most Test appearances for Australia, Wallabies captain Andrew Slack gave the captaincy to Poidevin for this Test. This was the third of four occasions that Poidevin captained Australia in his Test career.

Poidevin then played in Australia's quarter-final Test against Ireland in what rugby journalist Greg Campbell, writing for The Australian, called "one of Australia's best, well-controlled and most dominant opening 25 minutes of rugby ever seen." Following a half-time lead of 24–0, Australia went on to defeat Ireland 33–15. He then played in Australia's semi-final match against France, lost 30–24. In For Love Not Money he described the semi-final as one of the greatest games of rugby he ever played in. "That semi-final has been described as one of the finest games in the history of rugby football", he wrote. "It had everything. Power, aggression, skills, finesse, speed, atmosphere and reams of excitement." He concluded his 1987 Rugby World Cup campaign in the Wallabies' 22–21 third-place playoff loss to Wales.

Following the 1987 Rugby World Cup, Poidevin was dropped from the Australian team for the single Bledisloe Cup Test of 1987, lost 30–16. This was the second time in his international career that he was dropped from the Australian team.

=== 1989 ===
Poidevin commenced his 1989 rugby season by making himself unavailable to play for New South Wales. However, he continued to make himself available for Australian selection. In For Love Not Money Poidevin wrote that, "I’d spent most of my years with the club [Randwick] in an absentee role while tied up with representative teams, and before I retired I wanted to have at least one full season wearing the myrtle green jersey."

Poidevin finished the year winning The Sydney Morning Herald best-and-fairest competition for the Sydney Club Competition with his teammate Brad Burke. He also won the Rothmans Medal for the best and fairest in the Sydney Rugby Competition.

Despite losing the major semi-final (a non-elimination game) to Eastwood, Randwick made it to the 1989 grand final where they played Eastwood again. Poidevin finished his 1989 season with Randwick with a 19–6 victory over Eastwood in the grand final at Concord Oval. The premiership win was Randwick's third consecutive grand final victory, their ninth in twelve years, and their 13th straight grand final.

==== Rugby Sevens ====
Poidevin played at the International Sevens at Concord Oval in March 1989. However, Australia made an early exit from the tournament. Later he toured with Australia for the Hong Kong Sevens, where Australia made it to the final, only to lose to New Zealand 22–10.

==== Sydney ====
Despite making himself unavailable for city and state selection in 1989, Poidevin was pressed by his Randwick coach Jeffrey Sayle to play for Sydney in a game against Country, which he did in a game Sydney comprehensively won.

==== New South Wales ====
Despite Poidevin making himself unavailable in 1989 for New South Wales, following an unexpected run of injuries, the New South Wales management asked Poidevin to play for them in a game against the touring 1989 British Lions. Poidevin agreed and played in a 23–21 loss to the Lions.

==== Australia ====
Despite making himself unavailable for the 1988 Australia rugby union tour of England, Scotland and Italy, and further announcing his unavailability for state selection, Poidevin had hoped to achieve national selection for the Australian Test series against the British Lions. However, Scott Gourley was selected as Australia's blindside flanker, following a good tour to the UK in 1988. Instead, Poidevin played in the curtain raiser to the first Test, playing for Randwick in a game against Eastern Suburbs.

After Australia won the first Test against the British Lions, Poidevin did not achieve national selection for the second Test. However, after the Lions defeated Australia in a violent second Test, public calls were made for Poidevin to be included in the third and series-deciding Test to harden the Australian forward pack. These calls were ignored, Poidevin missed selection for the third Test, and Australia lost to the Lions in the third Test 19–18.

Following the 1989 British Lions series, Poidevin achieved national selection for the only time in 1989 for the one-off Bledisloe Cup Test against New Zealand to be played in Auckland. Peter Jenkins in Wallaby Gold: The History of Australian Test Rugby documented that:

But the King was also to return from exile. Simon Poidevin, one of Australia's most competitive forwards of any era, was invited back into the fray. He had been retired, but calls for his comeback had been issued in the press during the Lions series, long before the official call was placed by selectors. Poidevin had a lust for combat with the All Blacks. He relished the opportunity, and happily accepted.
There was an aura about the flanker, a respect for how he approached the game, the passion he injected and the pride with which he wore the jumper. Dwyer roomed him with the rookie Kearns in the lead-up to the Test. The veteran and the new boy. A common tactic by coaches but one Kearns recalled as significant in his preparation.

Australia fielded a relatively inexperienced side, and with Phil Kearns, Tim Horan and Tony Daly making their debut for the Wallabies, Poidevin assumed a senior role within the side. Poidevin would later describe the Test as "one of the best Test matches I’d experienced." Against an All Blacks side that had been undefeated since 1987, Australia trailed 6–3 at half-time, but went on to lose 24–12.

Following Australia's one-off Bledisloe Cup Test of 1989, Poidevin then made himself unavailable for the 1989 Australia rugby union tour of France.

=== 1990 ===
==== Australia ====
Poidevin did not play international rugby in 1990. He missed the three-Test home series played between Australia and France, the following match against the United States, before making himself unavailable for the 1990 Australia rugby union tour to New Zealand. In For Love Not Money Poidevin wrote that, "I'd made this journey on long tours in 1982 and 1986 and had no desire to undertake 'one of the life's great pleasures once again.'" Poidevin was one of Australia's three premier flankers to make himself unavailable for the tour, along with Jeff Miller and David Wilson.

==== Randwick ====
In the Sydney club premiership, Poidevin played in Randwick's grand final victory over Eastern Suburbs, won 32–9 – Randwick's fourth consecutive premiership in a row and their tenth since 1978. He also played in Mark Ella's final game for Randwick against the English club Bath, winning 20–3.

=== 1991 ===
==== Rugby sevens ====
Poidevin commenced his 1991 rugby season by participating in a three-day sevens tournament held in Punta del Este in Uruguay, as part of an ANZAC side composed of both Australian and New Zealand players (and one Uruguayan). Poidevin played alongside players such as Australia's Darren Junee and All Blacks Zinzan Brooke, Walter Little, Craig Innes and John Timu. On the first night of the tournament the ANZAC side won all its games, giving them a day's break before the knock-out stage. The ANZAC side won their quarter-final and semi-final in extra time, before defeating an Argentinean club side in the final.

==== New South Wales ====
In February Poidevin travelled back to South America with the New South Wales rugby union team for a three-match tour, before one extra game to be played in New Zealand against North Harbour. New South Wales defeated Rosario 36–12, before drawing against Tucumán 15–15 in the second match of the tour, after which New South Wales finished their tour with a 13–10 victory over Mendoza. New South Wales finished their overseas tour with one match in New Zealand against Buck Shelford's North Harbour team. Much media interest surrounded the battle that Poidevin would have with Shelford. New South Wales defeated North Harbour 19–12.

Following his overseas tour with New South Wales, Poidevin was part of New South Wales’ domestic season for 1991.

New South Wales won their first two matches against New Zealand domestic teams, defeating Waikato 20–12 and then Otago 28–17.

New South Wales then commenced their interstate games against Queensland. New South Wales defeated Queensland 24–18 at Ballymore in the first interstate game, before defeating Queensland 21–12 at Concord Oval in Sydney. The double-defeat of Queensland marked only the second time in the previous 16 years that New South Wales had defeated Queensland in two games in the same domestic season.

New South Wales then faced the touring 1991 Five Nation champion English side that had also won the Grand Slam that year. New South Wales defeated England 21–19. New South Wales then faced the touring Welsh side, defeating them 71–8.

New South Wales’ three wins and a draw in Argentina, plus six wins in their domestic season, meant that they finished their 1991 season with nine wins, one draw, and no losses.

==== Australia ====
Poidevin missed national selection for Australia's first Test of the 1991 season against Wales, with Australian selectors choosing Jeff Miller as Australia's openside flanker for their first Test against Wales, thus breaking apart the New South Wales back row of Poidevin, Viliami Ofahengaue, and Tim Gavin. Australia defeated Wales 63–6 and Miller was acclaimed Australia's man of the match.

Following Australia's victory over Wales, Miller was controversially dropped from the Australian rugby union side in favour of Poidevin for Australia's one-off Test against 1991 Five Nations Champions England.

Miller's dropping caused controversy following his man of the match performance, and many Queenslanders expressed their disapproval of Australia coach Bob Dwyer's selection. Queensland captain Michael Lynagh went public criticising Dwyer for dropping Miller.

Dwyer explained his selection by stating that, ‘England pose a great threat close to the scrum and we need to combat that. For that reason, we need Poidevin ahead of Miller, just for his strength.’

Poidevin's return to the Australian side marked the first time he played for the national team since the one-off 1989 Bledisloe Cup Test. It also marked a rare time when Poidevin was selected in the openside flanker position for Australia (Poidevin generally played on the blindside). Australia defeated England 40–15 at the Sydney Football Stadium in which Poidevin suffered a pinched nerve in his shoulder during the 60th minute of the Test. Gordon Bray said on commentary during the match: 'Simon Poidevin – maybe not 100 per cent – but I'll tell you, they'll need a crowbar to get Poido off the field.'

Poidevin then played in the first Bledisloe Cup Test of 1991 at the Sydney Football Stadium, with Australia victorious over New Zealand 21–12. Poidevin opposed All Black Michael Jones, then widely regarded the best flanker in the world.

Poidevin played in the second Bledisloe Cup Test played in Auckland, which New Zealand won 6–3. In For Love Not Money, Poidevin criticised the performance of Scottish referee Ken McCarthy "for effectively destroying the Test as a spectacle." Poidevin wrote that:

If it was dreadful watching it, then rest assured it was even worse playing! He almost blew the pea out of his whistle. There were no fewer than 33 penalties and too few (none, in fact, that come to mind) advantages played. In short, McCartney was a disgrace. He tried to referee as though he had charge of a third-grade game on the Scottish Borders, instead of two international teams wanting to play to the death. He was much too inexperienced, outdated in his interpretations of the Laws and probably intimidated by the intense atmosphere out in the middle.

==== Randwick ====
Following Australia's international season prior to the 1991 Rugby World Cup Poidevin played in Randwick's playoff matches in the Sydney Rugby Competition. Randwick lost to Eastern Suburbs 25–12 in the major semi-final (a non-elimination match), before rebounding by defeating Parramatta in the final, and then beating Eastern Suburbs in a return match in the Grand Final 28–9. Randwick's Grand Final victory in the 1991 Sydney Club Competition was their fifth-straight premiership and their 11th in their previous 14 years.

==== 1991 Rugby World Cup ====
Poidevin was a member of the victorious Australia team at the 1991 Rugby World Cup, playing in five of their six Tests in the tournament (he was rested for the Test against Western Samoa).

Poidevin played in Australia's first group-stage match of the tournament against Argentina, in a back row composed of himself, Ofahengaue and John Eales at number eight. Australia won the first match 32–19. Australia coach Bob Dwyer was critical of the Australian forwards following the Test, indicating that he was dissatisfied with the Australian second and back row.

Poidevin's was rested for Australia Test against Western Samoa. Australia won the Test 9–3 with Australian fly-half Michael Lynagh kicking three successful penalty goals. Lynagh's on-field captaincy, due to the absence of an injured Nick Farr-Jones, received praise from Poidevin following the Test. The Australian team was heavily criticised following their narrow win against Western Samoa.

Poidevin played in Australia's third and final group match against Wales, in a back row now composed of himself, Jeff Miller at openside, and Ofahengaue at number eight. Australia won the Test 38–3 in what was Wales' then largest defeat on home soil. The Australian forwards received praise from Dwyer.

Poidevin played in Australia's quarter-final against Ireland. In the 74th minute of the test, Irish flanker Gordon Hamilton scored a run-away try that gave Ireland the lead. Following Ralph Keyes' successful conversion in the 76th minute for Ireland, Australia had four minutes to win the Test. In the final stages of the quarter-final, on-field Australian captain Michael Lynagh called a play that brought David Campese toward that Australian forwards on a scissors’ movement. As a maul formed around David Campese, the Irish hooker Steve Smith came close to ripping the ball from Campese before Poidevin grabbed hold of the ball and drove Australia forward, allowing Australia to be given the scrum feed. Australia scored the game-winning try in the following phase of play, defeating Ireland 19–18.

Following Australia's narrow quarter-final victory over Ireland, Poidevin's place in the Australian side came under scrutiny. In The Winning Way, Dwyer relates that, "We decided that we needed changes, believing that we could not beat the All Blacks with the team which scraped through against Ireland. One selector was definite on this point. ‘If we choose that same forward pack,’ he said, ‘we will be presenting the match to New Zealand.’ In particular, we knew that we could not allow New Zealand to dominate us at the back of the line-out. Reluctantly, we left Jeff Miller out of the team and replaced him with Troy Coker."

In Dwyer's second autobiography Full Time: A Coach's Memoir the selector noted in Dwyer's first autobiography is revealed to be former Australian coach John Connolly. Dwyer wrote that, "We had edged through the pool games without Tim [Gavin], never quite managing to get the forward mix quite right to compensate for his absence. I can remember the hard-headed Queensland coach and Wallabies selector John Connolly remarking before the semi that if we selected the same back row we might as well give the game to the All Blacks."

However, in Perfect Union, the autobiography of Australian centres Tim Horan and Jason Little, a conflicting account to Dwyer's is given of Miller's dropping. Biographer Michael Blucher documented that:

The selectors had tinkered early with the back row, but Connolly was convinced they had fielded the optimum combination against Ireland, with Miller and Poidevin as flankers, and Ofahengaue at No. 8.
Dwyer was not convinced, nor to a lesser extent was [Barry] Want… Connolly in part accepted Dwyer's supposition about the need for height at the back of the lineout against the All Blacks, but at whose expense? If anyone was to go, he believed it should be Poidevin. Miller was faster and, in his opinion, had better hands and was more constructive at the breakdown. But Dwyer insisted Poidevin should stay. Want supported him, so Connolly was clearly outnumbered.

In Full Time: A Coach's Memoir Dwyer explained his decision to drop Miller and keep Poidevin was due to Poidevin's strength. He wrote that, "Leading up to that match our flanker Jeff Miller had been absolutely brilliant but we made the extremely unpopular decision to drop him in favour of the more physically-imposing Simon Poidevin."

Poidevin played in Australia's semi-final against New Zealand, in which the Wallabies defeated the All Blacks 16–6.

Poidevin played in Australia's 12–6 victory over England to win the 1991 Rugby World Cup. Among the highlights of the final was a tackle that English flanker Mickey Skinner made on Poidevin in the 20th minute. In For Love Not Money Poidevin recollects that, "Among the many moments I remember from the final was the hit on me early in the game by rival flanker Mickey Skinner, without doubt the best English player on the day. I spotted him only a fraction of a second before he collected me with his shoulder and he caught me a beauty. He waited for a reaction and got it. 'Do your bloody best, pal!' and I laughed at him. I wasn't about to let him know that it was a great hit and my head was still spinning."

Dwyer recounts the devastating tackle Skinner made on Poidevin in The Winning Way, writing that, "One of my memories of the first half is Simon Poidevin retaining possession after he was brought down in a heavy tackle by Micky Skinner. The tackle shook the bones of the people watching from the grandstand, so I can imagine its effect on Poidevin. After the match, I asked Poidevin in a light-hearted way how he enjoyed the tackle. He replied, 'I didn't lose possession, did I?' That was the important thing."

Following the 1991 Rugby World Cup, Poidevin retired from international rugby. He played 59 times for the Wallabies, becoming the first Australian to play 50 Tests. He captained the team on four occasions.

== Life after rugby ==
After retiring from the Wallabies in 1991, Poidevin became a stockbroker, although he maintained his links to rugby by working as a television commentator for the Seven Network and Network Ten. He was Managing Director of Equity Sales at Citigroup in Australia. Poidevin joined Pegana Capital in March 2009 as executive director. From March 2011 to November 2013 he was a non-executive director at Dart Energy. From October 2011 to November 2012, Poidevin was a board member of ASX listed Diversa Limited. In September 2011, he became executive director at Bizzell Capital Partners. In March 2013, he joined Bell Potter Financial Group as Managing Director Corporate Stockbroking. He is also a non-executive director of Snapsil Corporation. In November 2017, he was banned from providing financial services for 5 years following ASIC investigation.

== Honours ==
- 26 January 1988: Awarded the Medal of the Order of Australia "for service to rugby union football".
- 1991: Inducted into the Sport Australia Hall of Fame.
- 29 September 2000: Australian Sports Medal
- 1 January 2001: Awarded the Centenary Medal "for service to Australian society through the sport of rugby union"
- 24 October 2014: Inducted into Australia Rugby's Hall of Fame.
- 26 January 2018: Appointed as a Member of the Order of Australia "for services to education, the community and rugby union".
- 15 September 2022: Poidevin's appointment to the Order of Australia is terminated by the Governor-General.

Preceded by Steve Williams	Australian national rugby union captain 1986–87	Succeeded by David Codey
