= Lance Walker =

Australian rugby union international

- Full name: Lance Robert Walker
- Born: 21 October 1955 (age 71) Ryde, Sydney, Australia

Rugby union career
- Position: Hooker
International career
Years	Team	Apps	(Points)
1982	Australia	2	(0)

Lance Robert Walker (born 21 October 1955) is an Australian former rugby union international.

Walker was born in Sydney and attended Cumberland High School.

A Dundas Valley product, Walker made his first-grade debut with Parramatta Two Blues in 1976. He played as a prop early in his career, before his Two Blues coach had him move to hooker in 1980, which proved to be his best position. Following an injury to Bruce Malouf, Walker was called up by the Wallabies as a replacement player on the 1981–82 Australia tour of Britain and Ireland, featuring in 10 tour matches. His two Test caps came on the 1982 tour of New Zealand, where he played in the 2nd Test in Wellington and 3rd Test in Auckland.

== See also ==
- List of Australia national rugby union players
