= Tony Parker (rugby union) =

Australian rugby union player (born 1961)

- Full name: Anthony Joseph Parker
- Born: 12 April 1961 (age 65) Brisbane, Australia

Rugby union career
- Position: Scrum-half
International career
| Years | Team | Apps | (Points) |
| 1983 | Australia | 3 | (0) |

Anthony Joseph Parker (born 12 April 1961) is an Australian former rugby union international.

A native of Brisbane, Parker attended St Joseph's College, Gregory Terrace and the University of Queensland. While studying for his medical degree he played for the University of Queensland Rugby Club.

Parker, a scrum-half, debuted for Queensland on his 20th birthday and was first called by the Wallabies for the 1981–82 tour of Britain and Ireland, where he was the reserve scrum-half. He was named for the Wallabies when Argentina toured in 1983 and again found himself on the bench, but gained his first cap replacing a concussed Dominic Vaughan in the 1st Test at Ballymore Stadium. This opened up an opportunity for Parker to start the 2nd Test at the Sydney Cricket Ground and he earned a third cap two-weeks later against the visiting All Blacks.

== See also ==
- List of Australia national rugby union players
