= Anthony D'Arcy =

Australian rugby union international

- Full name: Anthony Michael D'Arcy
- Born: 10 October 1958 (age 68) Port Moresby, PNG
- School: St Joseph's College, Nudgee

Rugby union career
- Position: Prop
International career
Years	Team	Apps	(Points)
1980–82	Australia	10	(0)

Anthony Michael D'Arcy (born 10 October 1958) is an Australian former rugby union international.

D'Arcy was born in Port Moresby and attended St Joseph's College, Nudgee, as a boarder. He was a Queensland under 19s representative and toured Europe with the Australian Schoolboys team in 1977–78.

A prop, D'Arcy was capped 10 times for the Wallabies between 1980 and 1982. He was a member of the Bledisloe Cup-winning side in 1980 and featured on the 1981–82 tour of Britain and Ireland.

Switching to rugby league in 1982, D'Arcy played at reserves level with the Penrith Panthers.

D'Arcy is a former coach of Northern Ireland club Ballymena, which he led to the 2002–03 All-Ireland title.

== See also ==
- List of Australia national rugby union players
