= Mark Davies (rugby union) =

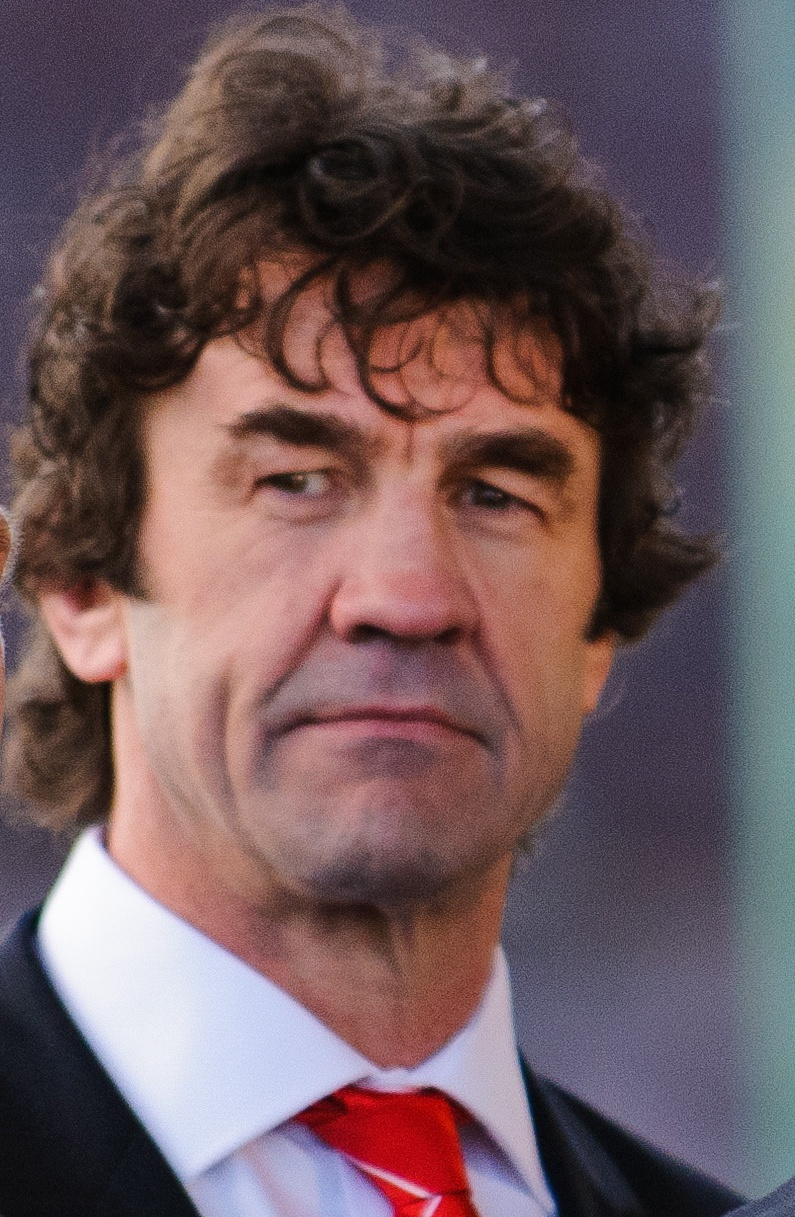
- Mark Davies
- Born: Mark Davies; 9 July 1958 (age 68) Maesteg, Wales
- University: Cardiff
- Occupation(s): Retired Rugby Player; Current: Physiotherapist

Rugby union career
- Current team: Welsh Rugby Union
Senior career
Years	Team	Apps	(Points)
- Swansea
International career
Years	Team	Apps	(Points)
1981-1985	Wales	3	(0)

Mark Davies is a former Wales International Rugby Union player. A flanker, Davies began his rugby career at Maesteg Comprehensive School and Nantyfyllon RFC before joining Swansea.

He made his debut for the Wales on 5 December 1981 versus Australia and went on to attain 3 caps for Wales between 1981 and 1985.

Davies has been involved with the Wales national rugby union team in non-playing roles since 1991 and joined the Welsh Rugby Union as a full-time member of staff in August, 1999.
