= Mick Mathers =

- Born: Michael John Mathers; 1 March 1955 (age 71) Perth
- School: Sydney Church of England Grammar North Sydney
- Occupation: Teacher

Rugby union career
- Position: Lock
Senior career
| Years | Team | Apps | (Points) |
- Eastwood
Provincial / State sides
| Years | Team | Apps | (Points) |
| 1979–1981 | New South Wales | 14 | (0) |
International career
| Years | Team | Apps | (Points) |
| 1973–1974 | Schoolboys | | |
| 1980 | Australia | 2 | (0) |

Mick Mathers (born 1 March 1955 in Perth) is an Australian former state and national representative rugby union player and current sporting administrator.

During his career he made over one hundred appearances for Eastwood Rugby Club and he played fourteen times for New South Wales.

As vicecaptain he toured the British Isles in 1973–74 with the Australian Schoolboys team. In 1980 he played two tests for Wallabies, but was also involved in 1979 Australia rugby union tour of Argentina and 1981–82 Australia rugby union tour of Britain and Ireland captaining the Wallabies in a few non-test matches.

In 2012 he was elected vicepresident of New South Wales Rugby Union.

His son, Phil Mathers, was a member of the winning Australian team at the 2006 Under 19 Rugby World Championship.
