= Peter Lucas (rugby union) =

Australian rugby union international

- Full name: Peter William Lucas
- Born: 24 September 1956 (age 70) Inverell, NSW, Australia

Rugby union career
- Position: Flanker / No. 8
International career
Years	Team	Apps	(Points)
1982	Australia	3	(0)

Peter William Lucas (born 24 September 1956) is an Australian former rugby union international.

Lucas, born in Inverell, New South Wales, played junior rugby in Sydney, but spent much of his childhood overseas, living in Fiji, the United States and Hong Kong. Capped by Hong Kong during his time there, he returned to Australia in 1978 and played for Wollongong club Shamrocks, then joined St. George in the Shute Shield two years later.

A loose forward, Lucas was controversially picked over Gary Pearse by the Wallabies for the 1981–82 tour of Britain and Ireland. He wasn't capped and instead made his debut on the 1982 tour of New Zealand, featuring in all three Tests as a number eight. Despite winning Sydney first-grade rugby's "best and fairest award" in 1983, Lucas was overlooked for that year's tour to France and Italy. He represented Australia in multiple editions of the Hong Kong Sevens.

== See also ==
- List of Australia national rugby union players
