= Dominic Vaughan =

Australian rugby union international

- Full name: Dominic Vincent Vaughan
- Born: 18 April 1960 (age 66) Newcastle, NSW, Australia

Rugby union career
- Position: Scrum-half
International career
Years	Team	Apps	(Points)
1983	Australia	5	(0)

Dominic Vincent Vaughan (born 18 April 1960) is an Australian former rugby union international.

Vaughan, born in Newcastle, attended Marist Brothers Hamilton and grew up playing rugby league, before picking up rugby union at the local Waratahs club. He was an Australia under-21s captain for a tour of New Zealand.

A scrum-half, Vaughan was capped five times for the Wallabies in 1983 forming a half-back partnership with Mark Ella and made his debut against the United States in Sydney. After a home Test against Argentina, in which he had to be substituted off with concussion, Vaughan gained a further three caps on the end of year tour of Italy and France. By 1984 he found himself out of favour due to the emergence of Nick Farr-Jones.

== See also ==
- List of Australia national rugby union players
