= Bruce Malouf =

Australian rugby union international

- Full name: Bruce Elias Malouf
- Born: 3 March 1956 Coonabarabran, New South Wales
- Died: 14 November 2019 (aged 63) Gold Coast, Queensland
- School: St Joseph's College, Hunters Hill

Rugby union career
- Position: Hooker
International career
Years	Team	Apps	(Points)
1982	Australia	1	(0)

Bruce Elias Malouf (3 March 1956 — 14 November 2019) was an Australian rugby union international.

Malouf, born in Coonabarabran, attended St Joseph's College, Hunters Hill and was a 1975 Australian Schoolboys representative player. He played his rugby as a hooker and made his first-grade debut with Randwick in 1977.

First called up by the Wallabies in 1980, Malouf was initially an understudy to Bill Ross. He was on the 1981–82 tour of Britain and Ireland, where a leg injury picked up while training in London kept him on the sidelines. His only Wallabies cap came in the 1982 Bledisloe Cup match at Lancaster Park, Christchurch.

Malouf was a first-grade coach at Manly RUFC during the 1990s.

== See also ==
- List of Australia national rugby union players
