= John Meadows (rugby union) =

- Full name: John Ernest Charles Meadows
- Born: 2 February 1949 (age 77) London, England

Rugby union career
- Position: Prop
International career
Years	Team	Apps	(Points)
1974–83	Australia	22	(0)

John Ernest Charles Meadows (born 2 February 1949) is an Australian former rugby union international.

Meadows was born in London and attended Sheerness Boy's Technical School, Kent. Moving with his family to Melbourne as a teenager, he finished his schooling at Prahran High School.

A strong scrummaging prop, Meadows played for the Kiwis club of Melbourne, the only non New Zealander in the expatriate formed club. He was a protege of Wales and British Lions prop John O'Shea, an immigrant to Melbourne.

Having impressed at state level for Victoria, Meadows made his Wallabies debut in 1974, against the All Blacks in Sydney. He was capped 22 times in total, featuring on the 1975–76 and 1981–82 British tours. Towards the end of his career, he was diagnosed with testicular cancer, but after successful treatment returned to Wallabies colours.

Meadows represented Queensland after relocating in 1982 to work for Wallaby Stan Pilecki's company.

== See also ==
- List of Australia national rugby union players
