= Declan Curran =

Australian rugby union player

- Born: Declan James Curran; 15 April 1952 Ballina, New South Wales

Rugby union career
- Position: prop
International career
Years	Team	Apps	(Points)
1980-83	Wallabies	5	(0)

Declan Curran (born 15 April 1952) was a rugby union player who represented Australia.

Curran, a prop, was born in Ballina, New South Wales and claimed a total of 5 international rugby caps for Australia.

His father, Frank Curran, played Rugby League for Australia.
