= Mick Martin (rugby union) =

Australian rugby union international

- Full name: Michael Clayton Martin
- Born: 5 May 1956 (age 70) Darlinghurst, Sydney, Australia

Rugby union career
- Position: Wing
International career
Years	Team	Apps	(Points)
1980–81	Australia	6	(8)

Michael Clayton Martin (born 5 May 1956) is an Australian sailor and former rugby union international.

Martin was born in Sydney and attended Parramatta Marist High School.

A Parramatta Colts product, Martin won a Shute Shield title with the Two Blues in 1977 and earned New South Wales selection for the first time two years later. He was capped a total of six times for the Wallabies playing as a winger, making his debut in Suva on the 1980 tour of Fiji. His winning try against the All Blacks in the 1st Test at the Sydney Cricket Ground in 1980 helped the Wallabies defend the Bledisloe Cup for the first time since 1934.

Martin is now an accomplished sailor and regularly competes in the Sydney to Hobart.

== See also ==
- List of Australia national rugby union players
