= Bill Ross (rugby union) =

Australian rugby union international

- Full name: William Scott Ross
- Born: 28 November 1956 (age 69) Brisbane, Australia

Rugby union career
- Position: Hooker
International career
Years	Team	Apps	(Points)
1979–83	Australia	13	(4)

William Scott Ross OAM (born 28 November 1956) is an Australian former rugby union international.

A Brisbane Grammar School product, Ross was an Australian Schools representative on the 1973/74 tour of Britain and by 1976 had been rewarded with a state debut for Queensland. He gained 13 caps for the Wallabies as hooker, debuting in 1979 against Ireland at Ballymore. His international career included a successful Bledisloe Cup defence in 1980. He attended Oxford University during the early 1980s, attaining a rugby blue.

Ross was team manager of the Queensland Reds between 1996 and 1998. He served as a Queensland Rugby Union selector from 2003 to 2006, then Vice President between 2010 and 2018. In the 2013 Queen's Birthday Honours, Ross was awarded a Medal of the Order of Australia (OAM) "for service to rugby union, and to the community".

== See also ==
- List of Australia national rugby union players
