= Brendan Moon =

Australia international rugby union player (born 1958)

Brendan Moon AM
- Born: Brendan Joseph Moon; 10 October 1958 (age 68)
- School: Marist College Ashgrove

Rugby union career
- Position: Wing
Provincial / State sides
Years	Team	Apps	(Points)
- Reds
-	Brothers Old Boys		
International career
Years	Team	Apps	(Points)
1978–1986	Australia	35	(56)

Brendan Moon AM (born 10 October 1958) is an Australian former rugby union wing who played for the Queensland Reds in the late 1970s and early 1980s. Moon played 100 games for Queensland and also played in the premiership winning Brothers Old Boys team of 1978, 1980–1983, Brendan also represented Australia in 35 tests and was considered one of the best finishing wingers in the game with excellent positional play and terrific acceleration.

For a number of years Moon has been helping the development of rugby union in Papua New Guinea, which he made his home, before returning to his native Queensland.

== Rugby career ==
=== Moon the player ===
Moon has been described as a "safe winger", and as such possibly did not stand-out as much as the risk-taking David Campese. Campese wrote of Moon that, "Maybe some people failed to see all his great attributes...” However he further added that, “… those who knew him recognised Moonie for what he truly was: a truly dependable wing who always did supremely well at what he did attempt. You looked at Brendan in the way a householder looks at an insurance policy; he was there, a protection especially in times of difficulty". Of Moon's safety Campese later noted that he was, "Not really a creator but give him a chance and he would score". Mark Ella has said of Moon that, "If you want a safe winger, Brendan’s it. I don’t mean a boring, stereotyped winger. It’s just that Brendan can do anything".

Moon was partly distinguishable by his running style. Mark Ella wrote of Moon that he was 'a beautiful runner' and that, "Moon was a runner of the classical type. He had a high knee action and his arms pumped as he ran". David Campese has asserted that, "His running style was especially impressive. He looked like a genuine track sprinter". Rugby journalist Terry Smith once said of Moon's running that, "With his fluent, graceful stride, it’s easy to imagine Brendan Moon putting on a pair of spikes and running for Australia in the Olympics."

Moon was also defined by his tremendous pace. Roger Gould once said of Moon that, "Very few players can run him down in a seventy-metre sprint". Further, David Campese has called Moon "blessed with great pace". In 1978, the year Moon debuted for the Wallabies, he was recognised as the fastest man in the Wallabies squad.

Moon was also characterised by his ability to remain on his feet while being tackled. David Campese described Moon's core strength by saying that, "once into his stride, he was devilishly hard to bring down". Former Australian fullback Roger Gould said of Moon that, "He’s so strong that he’ll break the tackle unless it’s perfectly timed". Mark Ella described Moon as: "He also had the size and strength to stay on his feet and unload, and he kept the ball alive whenever he could."

Moon was renowned for tremendous defensive skills. Campese wrote of Moon that: 'He also had good strength and his defence was sound.' former professional rugby league footballer Mal Meninga said of Moon that, "his defence was solid (Campese & Meninga, 1994: 248)”. Mark Ella has said of Moon that, "he just doesn’t miss a tackle."

Moon has often been praised for his completeness as a player. Mark Ella wrote of Moon that he "had the ball skills of a five-eighth or centre." Terry Smith wrote if Moon that, "There wasn’t a weak link in Moon’s armory. He’s had the lot. Speed of limb and thought, safe hands, resoluteness in the tackle". David Campese wrote of Moon that, "when he did something he did it well. He also appeared to do things easily, the mark of a well balanced player.

=== Place in history ===
Former All Black winger Stu Wilson said that Moon was the best winger he ever played against. Wilson himself is documented as having been outplayed by David Campese in 1982 – something Wilson himself concedes.

Australian captain of the 1984 Grand Slam Wallabies Andrew Slack said of Moon, following an injury Moon suffered against England on the 1984 Australia rugby union tour of Britain and Ireland, that 'I don't suppose there has ever been a better Australian Rugby player'.

During that 1984 Australia tour former Australian fullback Roger Gould ranked Moon alongside Mark Ella as "the best Australian player I’ve seen".

Former Australian flanker Simon Poidevin said of Moon in his autobiography For Love Not Money (1990) that, "he's the best winger I’ve played with or against… ”. However, in a re-released version of his autobiography following the 1991 Rugby World Cup, Poidevin described David Campese as "our undoubted star", praised him for playing "the best he'd ever played", and stated that "He undoubtedly was the leading light in the whole tournament". He further called him "the best attacking player in the world" and "definitely the star performer in the World Cup".

In the tribute book David Campese (1996), David Campese rated Moon as one of the three best wingers he'd ever seen, along with John Kirwan and Serge Blanco – who occasionally played on the wing. In his 1991 autobiography On a Wing and a Prayer, Campese placed Moon in the best Australian team of his time. In Campo: Still Entertaining (2003) Campese also placed Moon on the wing in his Australian All Stars side.

In Path to Victory (1987) Mark Ella ranked Brendan Moon a better player than David Campese, citing that: "I think Benny is Australia’s best ever winger... David Campese is exciting and different and can do anything but Benny is a more complete player."

However, in Running Rugby (1995), following many of David Campese's accomplishments, Mark Ella wrote of Campese that, "I do not know of anyone in any sport, with the single exception of Don Bradman in cricket, who has been at the very pinnacle of the game for as long as David Campese. If I had been asked to pick a World XV in 1984, Campese would have been the first player I chose. If I were asked to do the same thing today, in 1995, he is still the first player I would choose". In light of this statement Ella likely rated Campese ahead of Moon by that stage. In Running Rugby (1995) Ella was also more conservative in rating Moon. Rather than saying who he felt was a better player Ella stated that: "Two of the three best wingers I have seen in international rugby were Australians – David Campese and Brendan Moon [the third being John Kirwan]".

== Awards and recognition ==
Moon was awarded the Australian Sports Medal (ASM) in 2000. He was appointed a Member of the Order of Australia (AM) in the 2022 Queen's Birthday Honours for significant service to public administration, and to rugby union.
