= Steve Williams (rugby union, born 1958) =

Australia international rugby union player

- Born: Steve Williams; 29 July 1958 (age 68) Narromine, New South Wales
- School: St. Joseph's College, Hunters Hill
- Occupation: Stockbroker

Rugby union career
- Position: Second-rower
Senior career
| Years | Team | Apps | (Points) |
- Drummoyne
| – | Manly RUFC | | |
Provincial / State sides
| Years | Team | Apps | (Points) |
| 1980–1985 | New South Wales | 21 | |
International career
| Years | Team | Apps | (Points) |
| 1980–1985 | Australia | 28 | |

Steve Williams (born 29 July 1958) is an Australian former state and national representative rugby union player who captained the Wallabies in five Test matches in 1985.

== Early life and sporting promise ==
A grazier's son, born in Narromine in far-western New South Wales, Williams was sent to boarding school at St Joseph's College in Sydney where his large frame and athletic promise was nurtured at the Joey's rugby nursery. He excelled as a schoolboy sportsman. He rowed in the First VIII for three years, won the GPS Schools Shot Put Championship in the Open division two years, played in the school's First XV for two years and was selected in the Australian Schoolboy's XV (1975 and 1976).

== Club rugby ==
He joined the Drummoyne Rugby Club from school but later moved to the Manly club and was there in 1983 when Alan Jones took over as coach. He captained this Manly team in 1983 to win the final. Jones was the new Australian coach from 1984 and he saw the value that Williams brought to the national pack in his line-out jumping, his surprising pace and fearless scrummaging. Jones also saw Williams' leadership potential.

== Representative rugby career and leadership style ==
Williams debuted for Australia against Fiji in the 1980 three match tour. He played in all matches including Australia's 22–9 Test victory. That year he also appeared for New South Wales Waratahs against the touring All Blacks and then was selected for the Wallabies in the first and second Tests of that year's Bledisloe Cup series. He suffered a broken jaw in the 2nd Test after starting a fracas with New Zealand's Mark Shaw and was out for the 3rd Test.

He made four appearances in 1981 against the touring French side – for Sydney, New South Wales and in both Tests. He was then selected for the 1981–82 tour of the British Isles but the first choice second-rowers were skipper Tony Shaw, and Peter McLean and Williams generally played in the minor matches other than the Test against England.

In 1982 Williams toured to New Zealand in the squad led by Mark Ella and played in eight matches including all three Tests against the All Blacks. In 1983 he represented against the United States, Argentina and New Zealand and made the European tour squad, playing late that year in Tests against France and Italy.

1984 was a golden year for Australian rugby and Williams played a prominent role. Three Tests were played at home against New Zealand where he formed a new second-row partnership with another giant name Steven – Steve Cutler. The team gained toughness and finessed its combinations in August before heading to the British Isles under captain Andrew Slack for the 1984 Grand Slam tour. Jones valued Williams' quiet lead-by-example ethic, his work ethic and the hard edge he brought to the pack especially in his ability to protect the young line-out star Cutler. Jones made Williams the forward leader and squad vice-captain.

Steve Williams proudly debuted as captain of the Wallabies in the first tour match against London Division and in another later mid-week game. He led the pack in all four Tests and was instrumental in the famous push-over try against Wales at Cardiff Arms which marked the coming of age of Australian forward play, an indication that the Wallabies could finally field a world-class pack. Howell quotes Mark Ella "When Alan Jones made Steve the senior forward, it was the best thing that could have happened. He took the responsibility and really drove the forwards. I must say Steve's lineout ability surprised me. Some of his jumping was sensational, particularly in the Irish test. It enabled us to take pressure off Steve Cutler by being able to throw to 2,4 or 6. To Williams up front, Cutler in the middle or Steve Tuynman at the back. Our lineout was complete."

The Grand Slam victory by the 1984 squad was the first ever for an Australian team. A number of the senior players retired at tour's end and some of the stars took a year off. Williams however played on enabling him a distinguished 1985. He captained the Wallabies in five Tests that year – victories in two match series against both Canada and Fiji before a 9–10 loss against New Zealand. He retired at the top, as his country's captain having played 56 matches for Australia, having made five Wallaby tours, with a then record for a second-rower of 28 Test appearances.

| Preceded by Andrew Slack | Australian national rugby union captain 1985 | Succeeded by Simon Poidevin |

== Sources ==
- The Spirit of Rugby (1995) (Collection of Essays) Harper Collins, Australia
- Howell, Max (2005) Born to Lead – Wallaby Test Captains, Celebrity Books, Auckland NZ
