= Mark Ella =

Australia international rugby union player

Mark Ella AM
- Born: Mark Gordon Ella; 5 June 1959 (age 67) La Perouse, New South Wales, Australia
- School: Matraville High School, Sydney
- Notable relative(s): Glen Ella (brother); Gary Ella (brother)

Rugby union career
- Position: Fly-half
Amateur team(s)
Years	Team	Apps	(Points)
- Randwick
Provincial / State sides
Years	Team	Apps	(Points)
- New South Wales
International career
Years	Team	Apps	(Points)
1980–1984	Australia	25	(78)

Mark Gordon Ella, AM (born 5 June 1959) is an indigenous Australian former rugby union footballer. Ella played at flyhalf/five-eighth and was capped by the Wallabies 25 times, captaining Australia on 10 occasions.

Ella made his debut tour with the Wallabies on the 1979 Australia rugby union tour of Argentina. He would later make his Test debut for Australia during the 1980 Bledisloe Cup Test series, in which the Wallabies defeated the All Blacks two games to one – the first three-Test series victory Australia against New Zealand since 1949, the first series victory over the All Blacks on Australian soil since 1934, and the first occasion the Wallabies successfully retained the Bledisloe Cup. In 1982, Ella was made captain of the Australia national rugby union team and he would go on to captain the Wallabies on 10 occasions from 1982 to 1983. After Arthur Beetson, he was the second indigenous Australian to captain a national sports team. Ella captained a depleted Australian team on the 1982 Australia rugby union tour of New Zealand, which the Wallabies would lose one game to two against the All Blacks. However, Australia scored 316 points in 14 matches on tour, including 47 tries. Ella is perhaps most famous for his performances on the 1984 Australia rugby union tour of Britain and Ireland, during which Australia achieved rugby union's Grand Slam by defeating the Home Nations in four consecutive Tests, with Ella scoring one try in each Test.

He and his brothers Glen (his twin) and Gary were educated at Matraville High School, where they learned to play rugby. All three went on to play for the Australia national team. Mark also played for Randwick and New South Wales domestically.

== Playing career ==
=== The five-eighth ===
Bob Dwyer, former coach of the Wallabies, in his first autobiography The Winning Way, claimed Ella to be one of the five most accomplished Australian players he had ever seen. Dwyer hailed Ella as number one "for mastery of the game's structure". This is perhaps due to Dwyer's perspective on the five-eighth's role: "A five-eighth's primary function is to draw defence and so open up space for the runners outside him." This conveys how Ella approached playing the five-eighth position.

Ella's approach to playing the five-eighth position was unique and different from that of any other five-eighth of his era, and involved many obvious characteristics different from those of his five-eighth contemporaries. Gareth Edwards writes in 100 Great Rugby Players that: "Firstly, he stands closer to his scrum-half than most other stand-off halves I have played with or against, so that he pulls back row forwards on him at an angle which makes it hard for them to change direction, once he has released possession, to harass the midfield". Ella describes the distance from which he stood from the scrum-half in his book Running Rugby, "Generally, I stood about 5 metres from the halfback and about 4 metres behind him. According to the old formula for the right-angled triangle, this means I was no more than 3 metres wide of him".

Relatively straight running was a distinguishable trait associated with Ella's game. This was intended to draw defenders towards him at a certain angle and help unleash his teammates into gaps. Ella wrote:

By standing close, the five-eighth ensures that he draws the open-side flanker. Any five-eighth standing close will look like a sitting duck to the flanker, who is therefore keyed up to flatten him. This is just what the five-eighth wants. Provided he runs fairly straight, the flanker will not be able to resist coming at him, and at the appropriate moment, having drawn the flanker, the five-eighth passes to the inside-centre. The moment this happens the flanker is out of the game, for he now has to turn around and chase. On the other hand, if the five-eighth stands wide or if he does not run fairly straight, the flanker can approach him at an angle. If the five-eighth then unloads, the flanker can continue on the same angle and nail the inside centre.

Standing flat demands exceptional ball handling skills, which were a hallmark of Ella's game. Ella's dependable hands were lauded by former Scottish rugby international Norman Mair in The Scotsman: "Ella has hands so adhesive that when he fumbled a ball against Scotland (in 1984) you would not have been surprised to see those Australians of the appropriate religious persuasion cross themselves."

Concerning the manner in which Ella regularly received the ball from his scrum-half; Ella gave no quarter to the speed at which the ball was delivered to him, regardless of how close he stood, trusting in his ability to safely hold the ball. Ella writes: "Once you have positioned yourself, the next thing is to demand a fast pass from the halfback. The quicker the ball reaches you the better, for every fraction of a second is important to the five-eighth, given that the opposition can be on top of him in less than two seconds. I used to insist on having the ball passed to me like a rocket."

Ella possessed a distinguishing trait of instantaneously igniting a backline movement. His vision and ability to 'read the play' is evidenced by his much-vaunted passing game. Gareth Edwards notes, "Next, he wastes no strides holding the ball he does not want to use, and flips it instantly on its way towards the wide open space down the touchline where danger-men like David Campese prowl..." Continuing his appraisal of Ella in The Scotsman, Mair wrote: "In his deft handling, the ball is often on in a fraction of a second". The London Observer described Ella as "the detonator which explodes the brilliance of the Australian backs at critical moments."

This, however, does not entail Ella passing the ball as fast as possible. The execution of Ella's backline ploys were expertly controlled by the timing and speed of his passes. Ella writes: "Quick passes are often a sign that the five-eighth is not reading the play. He (the five-eighth) is throwing a quick pass automatically, believing this is what he ought to be doing, without making an assessment of the play and of the opportunities that might exist at that moment. By doing so, he is handing the initiative back to the opposition".

Mair concluded his appraisal of Ella's form in the famous 1984 Grand Slam tour in The Scotsman, stating: "Nothing about the football of the likable Ella excels his backing up. His ability to materialise in a given spot is of the spirit world". The extent to which Ella supported his teammates has been gauged by Gareth Edwards who wrote that, "In rugby the word 'link-man' is almost a cliché, yet it is the term I must choose to sum up Mark's gifts." Edwards continues writing that:

Thirdly, it has to be said that there are plenty of stand-off halves in the modern game – some of them internationals – who are content to give their centres possession and let back row forwards do the main support job. Mark Ella could not bear to lose involvement in an attack like that. Having delivered his pass, he invariably, it seems to me, keeps moving, getting himself between centre and wing on an extended loop– or even outside his wing! Such off-the-ball running is a true sign of greatness ...

Throughout his career, Ella's ability to 'keep the ball alive' resulted in many remarkable tries. Such "faultless positional play in support", resulted in a continuity of play which was regarded by many to have tremendous entertainment value. In 100 Great Rugby Players, Gareth Edwards concludes his writings on Ella by stating: "In this book, we are mainly concerned with players' outstanding ability to play the game, but it is worth adding here that Mark Ella provided tremendous entertainment to spectators, as well as demonstrating his skills".

== International career ==
Ella came into contention for national selection during the 1979 Ireland rugby union tour of Australia that included two Tests. On 26 May 1979, Ella played for New South Wales in Ireland's third tour game which NSW lost 12–16. Ella also played for Sydney in Ireland's seventh tour game, which Sydney won 16–12. Irish captain and flanker Fergus Slattery stated, following the tour, that Mark Ella was the Australian five-eighth who troubled Ireland the most.

Ella was again overlooked for national selection for Australia's one-off Bledisloe Cup Test in 1979 against New Zealand, which Australia won 12–6 in a tryless Test.

Following Australia's 1979 Bledisloe Cup victory, Bob Templeton replaced Dave Brockhoff as coach of the Australia national rugby union team. With Australia scoring one try in their past three Tests, Templeton selected Ella for the 1979 Australia rugby union tour of Argentina. Ella made his debut for the Wallabies during their second touring match against Interior on 16 October 1979, scoring a try in a 47–12 win. Ella played in Australia's fourth touring match against Rosario, which Australia won 21–13.

Ella almost achieved national selection for the first Test following injuries to Paul McLean and Roger Gould. The possibility arose that the Australian selectors might move incumbent five-eighth Tony Melrose to fullback, allowing Ella to fill the five-eighth role. However, McLean played fullback with a broken wrist in plaster, denying Ella the possibility of playing his first Test for Australia. Between the first and second Australian Tests against Argentina, Ella played in Australia's last provincial match against Cuyo, won 43–4.

In 1980 Australia's incumbent five-eighth, Tony Melrose, turned professional to play rugby league. Following this, Ella was selected for the 1980 Australia rugby union tour of Fiji. Ella was a surprise omission at five-eighth for Australia's one-off Test against Fiji in 1980, after Queensland five-eighth Paul McLean was selected at fullback against Fiji. However, Sydney University's five-eighth Michael Hawker was chosen ahead of Ella for the five-eighth position.

=== 1980 Bledisloe Cup Test Series ===
In 1980 the Wallabies retained the Bledisloe Cup with a 2–1 series victory over the All Blacks. The 1980 Bledisloe Cup Test series victory was the Wallabies' first three-Test series victory over the All Blacks since 1949, and their first three-Test series victory against the All Blacks on Australian soil since 1934.

Ella played against the All Blacks in their first touring match against Sydney that was drawn 13-13, in which Ella received the man of the match award. Prior to Australia's first Test against New Zealand in 1980, incumbent Australian outside center Andrew Slack withdrew from the Australian side due to injury. The selectors picked three former players from the 1977/78 Australian Schoolboys to comprise Australia's mid-field – Mark Ella at five-eighth, Michael Hawker at inside centre, and Michael O'Connor at outside centre. O'Connor was originally slated to play on the wing outside of Slack.

Making his debut for the Wallabies, Ella "opened the scoring with a dropped goal" on his non-preferred right boot. With the scores tied at 9–9, Ella set-up a try for Australian winger Mick Martin by looping Michael Hawker. Australia went on to win the first Test 13–9.

Australia lost the second Test 9–12.

Prior to Australia's third Test against New Zealand in 1980, Queensland five-eighth Paul McLean played in a historic Queensland victory over New Zealand (9–3), thus challenging Ella for Test selection. However, Ella was retained for the third Test against New Zealand with McLean selected on the bench.

The third Test against New Zealand in 1980 contained one of the most famous moments of Mark Ella's rugby career – his "around-the-body-pass." Ella's biographer Bret Harris documents that:

"With a sound platform, the backs performed feats of magic. Mark's wayward genius was evident in Australia's second try. The backs charged down the narrow side of the field in a passing rush, but the movement was halted by the cover defence. The backline quickly realigned towards the right hand side of the field with a golden opportunity to attack from the ensuing maul. But Mark incorrectly called 'left' and found himself in no man's land, surrounded by three All Black forwards. With Andy Haden almost smothering him like a grizzly bear, Mark pirouetted and curved the ball behind the giant All Black's back to Hawker, who sent O'Connor dashing for the tryline. It was one of the most extraordinary pieces of rugby seen in a Test match in a long while."

Four minutes following Ella's "around-the-body-pass" he kicked his second drop-goal in international rugby, once again on his non-preferred right foot. The final score of 26-10 marked what was Australia's then largest victory over New Zealand.

=== Australia v France (1981) ===
Following Australia's famous victory over New Zealand in 1980, Ella was dropped from the Australian side for Queensland five-eighth Paul McLean following Queensland's dominance over New South Wales in their interstate contests during 1981.

Australian coach Bob Templeton is reported later explaining Ella's omission saying that, "The French were a far more volatile team than the All Blacks and we had to change our approach accordingly. Any loose ball or mistakes could be dynamite. So we were probably a little more conservative."

Australia narrowly won the first Test 17-15 without Ella. Paul McLean kicked one goal from seven attempts.

Following the first Test against Queensland, Roger Gould was selected to play fullback for the second Test, replacing Geoff Richards. However, Gould had to withdraw from the second Test due to injury. Forced to re-organise the Australian side, Wallabies coach Bob Templeton selected incumbent five-eighth Paul McLean at fullback for the second Test against France, and reinstated Mark Ella at the five-eighth position.

In the 57th minute of the Test, Ella created a try for Australian outside centre Michael O'Connor by looping his inside centre Michael Hawker.

McLean kicked four penalty goals and two conversions.

...

In 1984 questions were asked of Mark's suitability to lead the Wallabies and so the Queenslander Andrew Slack was given the captaincy instead. After a narrow defeat against the All Blacks the Wallabies toured the UK and achieved victory in all 4 tests. Mark achieved a "Grand Slam" by scoring a try in every test match of the series, something that he had also accomplished on the 1977/78 Australian Schoolboys tour. At age 25, Ella stunned the rugby world by announcing his retirement, turning down many big money offers in the process.

== After rugby ==
Ella is now a director of the Sports and Entertainment Group. In 2005 he was honoured as one of the inaugural five inductees into the Australian Rugby Union Hall of Fame. In 1997 he was inducted into the International Rugby Hall of Fame.

In 2007 he published his eponymous autobiography, co-written with journalist Bret Harris.

In January 2010 Ella commenced work with the Port Macquarie-Hastings Council as sports and events manager. He left the role to return to a coaching role with the Wallabies in October of the same year.

Ella works at NITV, Australia's free-to-air Indigenous television station. In 2011 he became Executive Producer and Head of NITV Sport, where "highlighting Indigenous sporting achievement has been a driving force behind the ... Barefoot Sports program."

In July 2021, Ella agreed to donate his collection of five jerseys from the famous 1984 Wallabies grand slam tour to the Australian Rugby Museum, which is currently in development.

== Recognition ==
In On a Wing and a Prayer former Australian winger David Campese called Ella "the best rugby player I have ever known or seen." He reiterated this contention in My Game Your Game by calling Ella, "The greatest player I have ever seen, or had the pleasure of playing alongside."

During the 1984 Australia rugby union tour of Britain and Ireland, Australian fullback Roger Gould rated Ella "with Brendan Moon as the best Australian player I've seen." Michael Hawker, who played with Ella at inside centre said, "Mark Ella was one of the greatest players– or probably the greatest player– I've ever seen." He also contended that Ella changed precepts on how the game could be played. Simon Poidevin wrote in For Love Not Money that, "Mark Ella remains the most talented rugby player I have ever seen." In 2024, Poidevin was quoted saying, "Mark Ella was the most naturally talented player I either played with or against – Mark didn’t like training hard but on the field, he was a genius who tackled superbly and bamboozled opposition defences with magic hands and incredible vision. As a backrower, it was always the best idea to hang close to Mark in attack as he could make you look really good with his offloads."

Rugby league player Wally Lewis, who played rugby union with Ella in the 1977/78 Australian Rugby Union Schoolboys side, called Ella the best player he's seen in rugby union or rugby league. Dual international Michael O’Connor, who played with Ella at inside centre, outside centre and wing for Australia, considers Ella the best player he ever played with – in rugby league or rugby union. In The Best of Both Worlds O'Connor is quoted saying that: 'Mark Ella was a genius. He was the best player I played with or against in both codes. He could sum up a situation instinctively... If I said to Mark "Okay let's run it", no problem– the next moment you'd have the ball in your hands... I don't think I’ve ever called for the ball from Mark and not received it.' In Ella: The Definitive Biography, O'Connor further added that: 'I still think he is the best player I played outside of. I enjoyed playing outside him. Such good service. Good, quick ball. You knew playing outside Mark something was on every time. Have a crack. You won't die wondering.'

In 2002 former Welsh eightman Eddie Butler, who played against Ella in 1984, ranked Ella at number one in his list of the 10 best fly-halves in the history of rugby union. In 2003, Butler called Ella his "all-time favourite player" and asserted he was "... by a long way the most influential player of his generation. Just took the passing game and the support game and the reading game and just stretched, stretched them into new areas." In 2020, former England fly-half Stuart Barnes ranked Ella the third greatest five-eighth of all time, behind All Black Dan Carter and Wales' Phil Bennett.

He was made a Member of the Order of Australia (AM) in the 1984 Australia Day Honours for services to rugby, and was inducted into the Sport Australia Hall of Fame in 1987. He received a Centenary Medal and an Australian Sports Medal in 2001. In 2013, Ella was inducted into the IRB Hall of Fame.

In 2013 Australian sports magazine Inside Rugby named its four Australian Invincibles – a rugby union equivalent of rugby leagues Immortals. Mark Ella was named alongside Col Windon, Ken Catchpole and David Campese as the first Invincibles of Australian rugby.

== Notes ==
Preceded by Paul McLean	Australia national rugby union team captain 1982–1984	Succeeded by Andrew Slack
