= Peter Grigg =

Australian rugby union winger

- Born: July 20, 1958 (age 66); Herberton, Queensland, Australia
- Occupation: Former rugby union player
- Years active: 1980–1987
- Known for: Representing Australia at the 1987 Rugby World Cup

Peter Grigg (born 20 July 1958) is an Australian former rugby union winger who played five matches at the 1987 Rugby World Cup. He was born in the Queensland town of Herberton and grew up in Ravenshoe, playing Rugby League for Millaa Millaa as a boy. He played 25 tests from 1980 to 1987 with his last test match being against Wales in the third place playoff. In his career, he scored 12 tries for the Wallabies.

== 1987 Rugby World Cup ==
Peter Grigg played in the pool games against England and Japan, scoring a try in the 42–23 win over Japan. He scored another try against Wales in the third place playoff in what was his last game for the Wallabies. He was aged 28 at this World Cup.
