= Michael Hawker =

Australian rugby union international

- Full name: Michael John Hawker
- Born: 11 October 1959 (age 67) Wellington, NSW, Australia

Rugby union career
- Position: Centre
International career
Years	Team	Apps	(Points)
1980–87	Australia	25	(32)

Michael John Hawker AM (born 11 October 1959) is an Australian former rugby union international. He was awarded the Member of the Order of Australia in 2010 for services to the financial industry and community.

Hawker, born in Wellington, New South Wales, attended Sydney Church of England Grammar School and was an Australian Schoolboys rugby representative, featuring on the unbeaten 1977–78 touring side. He went on to study at the University of Sydney, where he attained a Bachelor of Science degree.

Mainly a centre, Hawker was capped 25 times for the Wallabies during the 1980s. After debuting as a 20-year old against Fiji in Suva, he surprisingly received the vice captaincy a month later for a home series against the All Blacks. He remained a candidate for the Test captaincy in future years, but ultimately would only lead the team in uncapped matches, including on the 1981–82 tour of Britain and Ireland. His kicking was not a particular strength, but in the 1982 Test against the All Blacks at Eden Park, he memorably kicked a drop goal from over 50 metres out.

Hawker is a former Insurance Australia Group CEO and served on the board of Westpac from 2020 to 2023.

== See also ==
- List of Australia national rugby union players
