= Andrew Slack =

- Born: Andrew Gerard Slack; 24 September 1955 (age 71) Brisbane, Australia
- School: Villanova College
- Occupation(s): Professional Rugby Union player & Sports Journalist

Rugby union career
- Position: Centre
Amateur team(s)
Years	Team	Apps	(Points)
- Souths Rugby
–	Wanderers F.C		
Provincial / State sides
Years	Team	Apps	(Points)
1975–87	Queensland	133	
International career
Years	Team	Apps	(Points)
1978–87	Australia	39	(40)

Andrew Gerard Slack (born 24 September 1955 in Brisbane) is an Australian former state and national representative rugby union player who captained the Wallabies in 19 Test matches in between 1984 and 1987. His 133 appearances for Queensland between 1975 and 1987 stood as the state record until bettered by Mark Connors in 2006.

He made 87 total appearances for Australia between 1978 and 1987, earning 39 Test caps. He scored 10 tries and captained Australia on 34 occasions in total. He was the tour captain for the Wallabies' 1984 tour Grand Slam feat.

== Early rugby ==
Andrew Slack attended school at Villanova College, Coorparoo, Queensland. He played his club rugby with Brisbane Souths and made his Queensland state debut against a Combined Services side, as a five-eighth at age 19 in 1975 before switching to centre for the rest of his career.

== Playing career ==
Slack debuted for Australia in 1978 in the home series against Wales which the Wallabies won 2-nil under Tony Shaw.

Slack is remembered as a key factor in the Wallabies' ascendancy to world class status, eventually guiding them to a Bledisloe Cup, a Grand Slam and a World Cup semi-final. Though a fine player in his own right, Slack's main strengths were his tactical acumen and the ability to get the most out of his teammates. These qualities made him a superb captain when he was eventually given the honour in 1984 and he would eventually lead Australia to 14 victories in 19 matches. His international debut came in Australia's 2–0 victory over Wales in 1978, a series even more violent and acrimonious than England's visit three years earlier. Australia were somewhat fortunate to win the second test when a Paul McLean drop goal was awarded despite sailing wide of the posts, but Slack enjoyed the winning feeling all the same. "There was controversy aplenty but after my first series it was two to us and nil to the others!" Wales were in the midst of a period when they were dominating European rugby and this test series win was notable in establishing the Wallabies credentials as a test side.

A year later he featured in one of Australia's finest hours – a 12–6 victory over New Zealand in Sydney, but then missed the following two international seasons. He returned for the 81/82 tour to the UK where Australia's gifted side lost three out of their four test matches, but Slack was able to register his first two tries against Wales and Scotland respectively. The same year Australia had an unsuccessful defence of the Bledisloe Cup but performed creditably in the 2–1 series loss.

In 1984 Slack was given the captaincy of Australia when coach Alan Jones' original choice of Mark Ella was vetoed by the selectors. The decision turned out to be a good one and Slack led the Wallabies to a momentous Grand Slam against the Home Nations on the autumn tour of the UK. The Wallabies were well received everywhere apart from Wales where Slack was spat upon by Llanelli fans when Australia played at Stradey Park. Australia responded in the most effective way possible by pulverising Wales 28–9 in the subsequent test match which included an unprecedented pushover try by Steve Tuynman. 'The Slam' was sealed with victory over Scotland at Murrayfield during which Slack confounded critics who said that he couldn't pass the ball by hurling a superb long ball for David Campese to score his first try. After the game Slack conceded that the emotion overcame him: "I got up to make a speech at happy hour and I've always been one to wear my heart on my sleeve. Yeah, the odd tear flowed."

He temporarily retired from the international game in 1985 but returned the year after to lead Australia to an even greater achievement than the Grand Slam – a series win on New Zealand soil, which put any doubt to rest over the Wallabies claims to being a world power. That year Australia also defeated France in Sydney, a forward performance which Slack rated as better than the victories over New Zealand in 1979 and Wales in 1984. Slack's career ended on a low note when Australia were beaten in the World Cup semi-final against France, and his last game came in the 3/4 play-off defeat by Wales.

He is one of six captains to lead his side to a test series win on New Zealand soil, along with Philip J. Nel (1937 Springboks), Trevor Allan (1949 Australia), John Dawes (1971 British Lions), Philippe Saint-André (1994 France) and Johnny Sexton (2022 Ireland).

== After rugby ==
Slack spent three years as a national selector for the Wallabies before he quit that role became the first backline player in 30 years to coach the Queensland Reds when he was appointed to the position in 2003. He only stayed in the position a season before quitting as coach after the unsuccessful season in which the team finished 8th in the Super 12.

In his playing days, rugby was an amateur game and his professional career started out as school teacher. Following the end of his Rugby career - he became a Sports Journalist and was Head of Sports at Nine News in Brisbane. He retired in 2016.

== Accolades ==
In 2010 he was honoured in the sixth set of inductees into the Australian Rugby Union Hall of Fame.

== Footnotes ==
Preceded by Mark Ella	Australian national rugby union captain 1984–1987	Succeeded by Steve Williams
