= Stan Pilecki =

- Born: Stanislaus Josef Pilecki; 4 February 1947 Augustdorf, Germany
- Died: 20 December 2017 (aged 70)
- School: Marist College Rosalie

Rugby union career
- Position: Prop
Amateur team(s)
| Years | Team | Apps | (Points) |
| 1964–1988 | Wests, Brisbane | | |
Super Rugby
| Years | Team | Apps | (Points) |
| 1975–1985 | Queensland | 122 | (41t) |
International career
| Years | Team | Apps | (Points) |
| 1978–1984 | Australia | 18 | (0) |

Stanislaw Pilecki OAM (4 February 1947 – 20 December 2017) was an Australian rugby union player. He was born in a refugee camp in Augustdorf, Germany, with his family emigrating to Australia in 1950. He was also an Old Boy of Marist College Rosalie in Brisbane.

Pilecki was the first player to play 100 matches for Queensland Reds, playing 122 matches in total. Pilecki also played 18 tests, and was the first player of Polish descent to play for Australia.

The Pilecki Medal is an award given to the Queensland Reds player of the year each season.
