= 1987 Australia rugby union tour of Argentina =

- Date: Oct–Nov 1987
- Coach: Alan Jones
- Tour captain: Simon Poidevin
Summary
P	W	D	L
Total
9	6	2	1
Test match
2	0	1	1
Opponent
P	W	D	L
Argentina
2	0	1	1

The 1987 Australia rugby union tour of Argentina was a series of matches played between October and November 1987 in Argentina and Paraguay by Australia. The Wallabies won seven matches of nine and lost the series of test matches against Los Pumas, led by Hugo Porta.

It was the second tour of an Australian side to Argentina, after their first visit in 1979.

== Results ==
=== Summary ===
Complete list of matches played by the Wallabies at Argentina:

Test matches

#	Date	Rival	City	Venue	Res.	Score
1	10 Oct	San Isidro Club	Buenos Aires	Estadio Vélez	D	22–22
2	14 Oct	Provincias Argentinas (Note: Combined team with players from the provinces of Argentina.)	Cipolletti	Marabunta RC	W	47–0
3	17 Oct	Cuyo RU	Mendoza	Estadio Malvinas Argentinas	W	40–3
4	20 Oct	Santa Fe RU	Santa Fe	Estadio C.A. Colón	W	37–18
5	24 Oct	Invitación XV (Note: Combined team with most of its players from the Buenos Aires RU.)	Buenos Aires	Estadio Vélez	W	36–15
6	27 Oct	Selección XV (Note: Team with Paraguayan and Argentine players)	Asunción (Note: Played in Paraguay.)	?	W	45–9
7	31 Oct	Argentina	Buenos Aires	Estadio Vélez	D	19–19
8	3 Nov	Rosario RU	Rosario	?	W	35—15
9	7 Nov	Argentina	Buenos Aires	Estadio Vélez	L	19-27

Balance
Pl	W	D	L	Ps	Pc
9	6	2	1	308	120

=== Match details ===
Legend: (Club/Union, in brackets):
BA = Buenos Aires RU, BN = Banco Nación, CASI = C.A. San Isidro, CP = Club Pucará, HC = Hindú Club, JCR = Jockey Club de Rosario, LT = Los Tilos, MM = Mariano Moreno, NEW = Newman, ORC = Olivos, PUY = Pueyrredón, SIC = San Isidro Club, SM = Pacific, UCR = Córdoba RU, UNT = Universitario (Tucumán), PRY = Paraguay RU, URT = Tucumán RU

10 October 1987

San Isidro Club	22–22	Australia
Try: scrum Pen: Loffreda (6)		Try: James; Williams; Carozza; Con: Lynagh (2); Pen: Lynagh (2)

Estadio Vélez Sarsfield, Buenos Aires
Referee: Efraín Sklar (Argentina)

Team details

San Isidro Club: Carlos Pirán; Fernando Sainz Trápaga, Alejandro Ramallo, Marcelo Loffreda (capt.), Diego Cuesta Silva; Rafael Madero, Alfredo Soares Gache; Ricardo de Vedia, Ignacio Cirio, Fernando Conti; Carlos Durlach, Gonzalo Gasso; Luis Lonardi, Juan José Angelillo, Diego Cash.
Australia: A. Leeds; I. Williams, M. Burke, M. Lynagh, P. Carozza; S. James, N. Farr-Jones (24' B. Smith); S. Lidbury, S. Tuynman, S. Poidevin (capt.); T. Coker,.S. Cutler; C. Lillicrap, M. McBain, A. McIntyre.

14 October 1987

Provincias Argentinas	0–47	Australia
		Try: Papworth; Burke; Cutler; Hawker; Martin (2); Hartill; Con: Lynagh 4, Smith; Pen: Lynagh 3

Marabunta RC, Cipolletti
Referee: José María Cabanas (Argentina)

Team details

Provincias Argentinas: G. Del Castillo (Rosario); R. Annichini (Entre Ríos), J. Caminotti (UCR), S. Mesón (URT), G. Terán (URT); J. Martínez Riera (URT), F. Silvestre (Mendoza); P. Garreton (URT), M. Ricci (URT), Lloveras (San Juan); S. Bunader (URT), P. Buabse (URT); J. Coria (URT), J. Baeck (Mendoza), R. Horta (URT).
Australia: A. Leeds; M. Burke, M. Cook, B. Papworth, M. Hawker; M. Lynagh (51' G. Martin), B. Smith; S. Poidevin (capt.), S. Lidbury, J. Miller; T. Coker, S. Cutler; M. Hartill, T. Lawton, E. Rodriguez.

17 October 1987

Cuyo RU	3–40	Australia
Pen: G. Filizzola		Try: Williams 2, Smith 3 Papworth, Martin; Con: Smith 3 Pen: Smith 2

Estadio Malvinas Argentinas, Mendoza
Referee: Jorge Cohen (Argentina)

Team details

Cuyo RU: D. Carbonell, G. Zakalik, V. Mazzalomo, C. Cipitelli (capt.), O. Morales; G. Filizzola, F. Silvestre; A. Filizzola, J. J. Chapetta, N. Bertranou; S. Gómez, P. Pérez Caffe; A. Gutiérrez, J. Baeck, P. Montilla.
Australia: G. Martin; I. Williams, B. Papworth, M. Hawker, M. Burke; S. James, B. Smith; J. Miller, S. Tuynman, J. Gardner; D. Frawley, T. Coker; M. Hartill, M. McBain, E. Rodriguez (capt.).

20 October 1987

Santa Fe RU	18–37	Australia
Try: Gustavo Álvarez; Con: Berra; Pen: Gustavo Álvarez 4		Try: Leeds 2 Williams 2 Hawker; Stuart; Con: Lynagh 5 Pen: Lynagh

Estadio de Colón, Santa Fé
Referee: Enrique Cazenave (Argentina)

Team details

Santa Fe: G. Álvarez; Questa, Berra, Hrycuk, Guillermo Álvarez; Salvá, Raffa (37' Gorla); Mordini, Barceló, D. de la Torre (67' J. de la Torre); Epelbaum, Barnukel; Torres, Clement (capt.), Hernández.
Australia: A. Leeds; I. Williams, M. Cook, P. Carozza; M. Lynagh, R. Stuart; S. Poidevin (capt.); S. Lidbury, J. Gardner; D. Frawley, S. Cutler; A. McIntyre, T. Lawton, C. Lillicrap.

24 October 1987

Invitación XV	15–36	Australia
Pen: Baetti 5		Try: Williams 4 Burke; Lynagh; Leeds; Con: Lynagh 4

Estadio Vélez Sarsfield, Buenos Aires
Referee: Roberto Magnani (Argentina)

Team details

Invitación XV: G. Angaut (BA); M. Gerosa (BA), J. Caminotti (UCR), M. Loffreda (BA) (capt.), C. Mendy (BA); R. Madero (BA), D. Baetti (BA); J. Uriarte (BA), M. Carreras (BA), P. Franchi (BA); A. Iachetti (BA), R. Cobelo (BA); P. Urbano (BA), J. Angelillo (BA), J. Coria (URT).
Australia: A. Leeds; I. Williams, B. Papworth, M. Lynagh, M. Burke; S. James, B. Smith; J. Miller, S. Lidbury, S. Poidevin (capt.); S. Cutler T. Coker (23' D. Frawley); M. Hartill, T. Lawton, E. Rodriguez.

27 October 1987

Selección XV	9–45	Australia
Try: Foulkes; Con: Yanguela; Pen: Yanguela		Try: Carozza, Burke 3 Cook, Martín 3 Frawley 2 Con: Hawker (2)

?, Asunción
Referee: José L. Rolandi (Argentina)

Team details

Selección XV: A. Camacho (PRY); S. Cabrera (PRY), F. Armadans (PRY), M. Bachero (PRY) (Mera -PRY), J. García (PRY); M. Lanfranco (NEW), I. Yangüela (PUY); R. Brazzon (PRY), R. Etchegoyen (MM), M. Foulkes (LT); R. Baez (PRY), E. Gallo (BN); G. Inganni (BN), M. Bosch (ORC), H. Lacarra (CP)
Australia: G. Martín; M. Burke, M. Hawker, M. Cook, P. Carozza; R. Stuart, N. Farr-Jones; J. Gardner, S. Tuynman, J. Miller; S. Lidbury, D. Frawley; C. Lillicrap, M. McBain, A. McIntyre.

31 October 1987

Argentina	19–19	Australia
Try: Cuesta Silva; Pen: Porta (4); Drop: Porta	Report	Try: Williams; Cutler; Lynagh; Con: Lynagh (2); Pen: Lynagh

Estadio Vélez Sarsfield, Buenos Aires
Referee: Keith Lawrence (New Zealand)

Team details

Argentina	Australia

Argentina: R. Madero (SIC); D. Cuesta Silva (SIC), F. Turnes (BN), M. Loffreda (SIC), C. Mendy (LT); H. Porta (BN; captain), A. Soares Gache (SIC); P. Garretón (Universitario de Tucumán), G. Milano (JCR), J. Allen (CASI); E. Branca (CASI), A. Iachetti (HC); D. Cash (SIC), A. Courreges (CASI), S. Dengra (SM). Coach: Rodolfo O'Reilly.
Australia: A. Leeds; I. Williams, B. Papworth, M. Lynagh, M. Burke; S. James, B. Smith; J. Miller, S. Lidbury, S. Poidevin (capt.) (66' S. Tuynman); S. Cutler, D. Frawley; M. Hartill, T. Lawton, E. Rodriguez. Coach: Alan Jones

3 November 1987

Rosario RU	15–35	Australia
Try: Crexell (3)		Try: Lawton; Burke; Tuynman; Miller; Hawker; Con: Smith (3); Pen: Smith (3)

?, Rosario
Referee: Eduardo Freyre (Argentina)

Team details

Rosario RU: G. Del Castillo; R. Luchini, R. Márquez, A. Trumper, J. Narvaja; S. Ansaldi, R. Crexell, G. Milano (capt.), C. Schnaider, P. Baraldi; O. Discaciatti, A. García; C. Hechen, M. Baraldi, D. Arrue (Muñiz).
Australia: B. Smith; P. Carozza, M. Hawker (capt.), M. Cook, M. Burke; R. Stuart, N. Farr-Jones; J. Gardner, J. Miller, M. McBain; S. Tuynman, D. Frawley; A. McIntyre, T. Lawton, C. Lillicrap.

7 November 1987

Argentina	27–19	Australia
Try: Mendy; Con: Porta; Pen: Porta (5); Drop: Porta (2)	report	Try: Williams (2); Con: Lynagh; Pen: Lynagh (3)

Estadio Vélez Sarsfield, Buenos Aires
Attendance: 45,000
Referee: Keith Lawrence (New Zealand)

Team details

Argentina	Australia

Argentina: R. Madero (SIC) (40' C. Mendy (LT)); D. Cuesta Silva (SIC); M. Loffreda (SIC), F. Turnes (BN), A. Scolni (Alumni); H. Porta (BN) (captain); A. Soares Gache (SIC); J. Allen (CASI), G. Milano (JCR), P. Garretón (UNT); A. Iachetti (HC), E. Branca (CASI); D. Cash (SIC), A. Courreges (CASI),(36' J. Angelillo (SIC) S. Dengra (SM). Coach: Rodolfo O'Reilly.
Australia: A. Leeds; M. Burke, M. Lynagh (capt.), B. Papworth, I. Williams; S. James, N. Farr-Jones; J. Gardner, S. Tuynman, J. Miller; D. Frawley, S. Cutler; A. McIntyre; T. Lawton, E. Rodriguez. Coach: Alan Jones

== Gallery ==
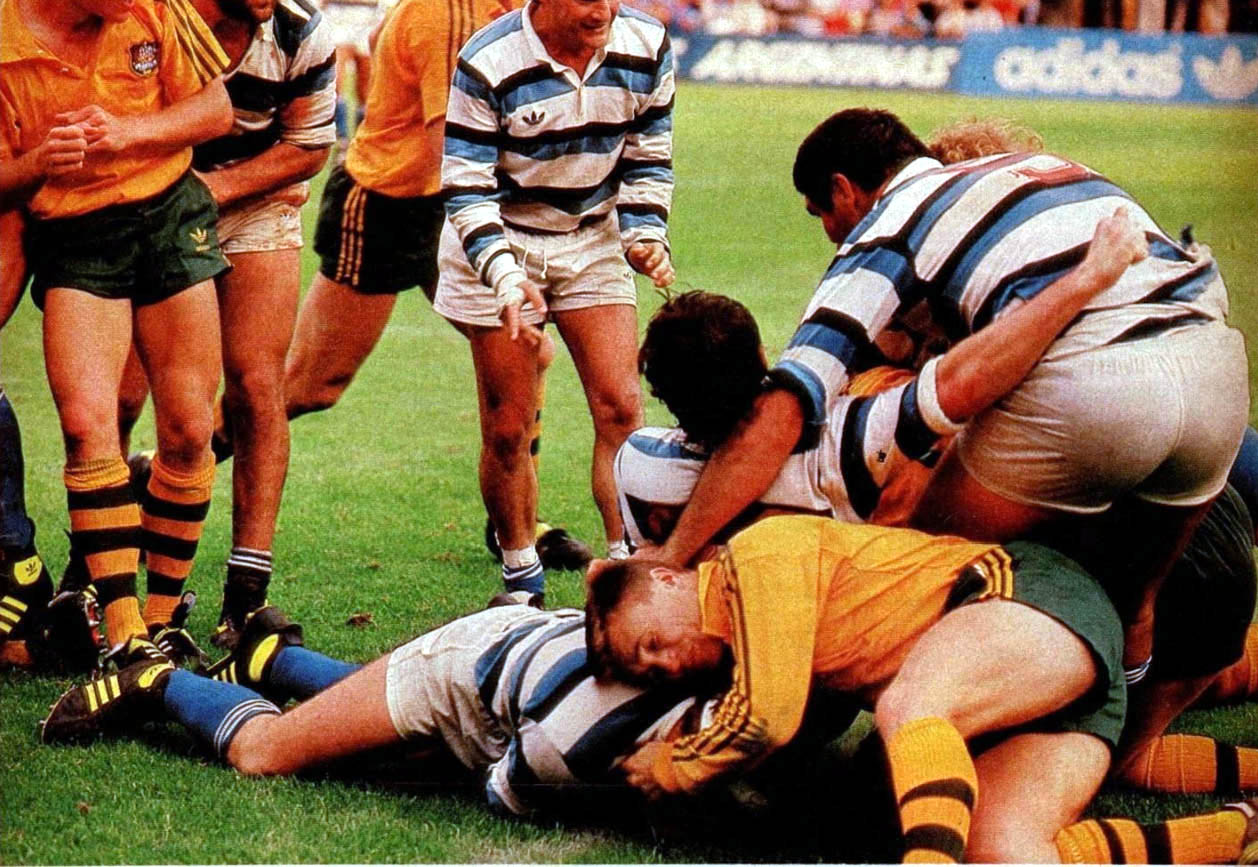
v San Isidro Club

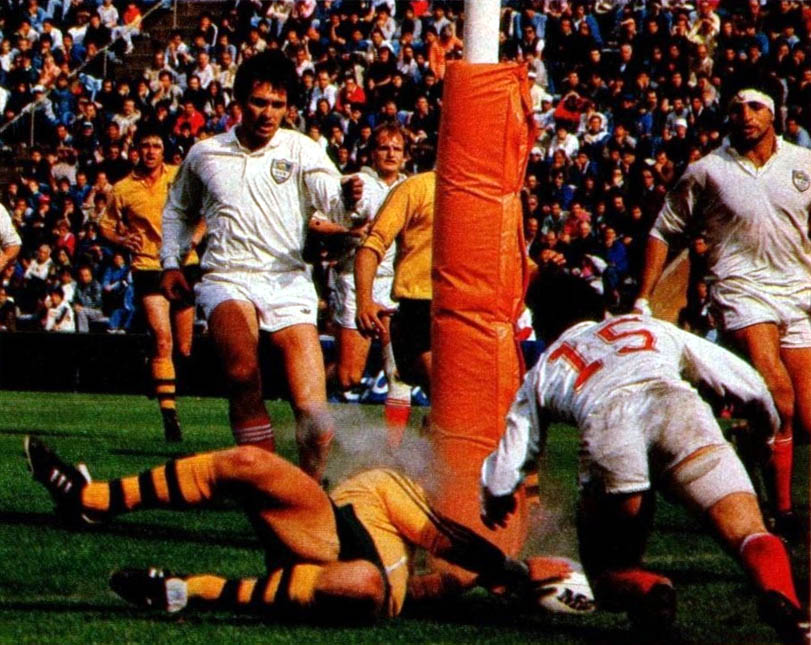
v Invitación XV combined

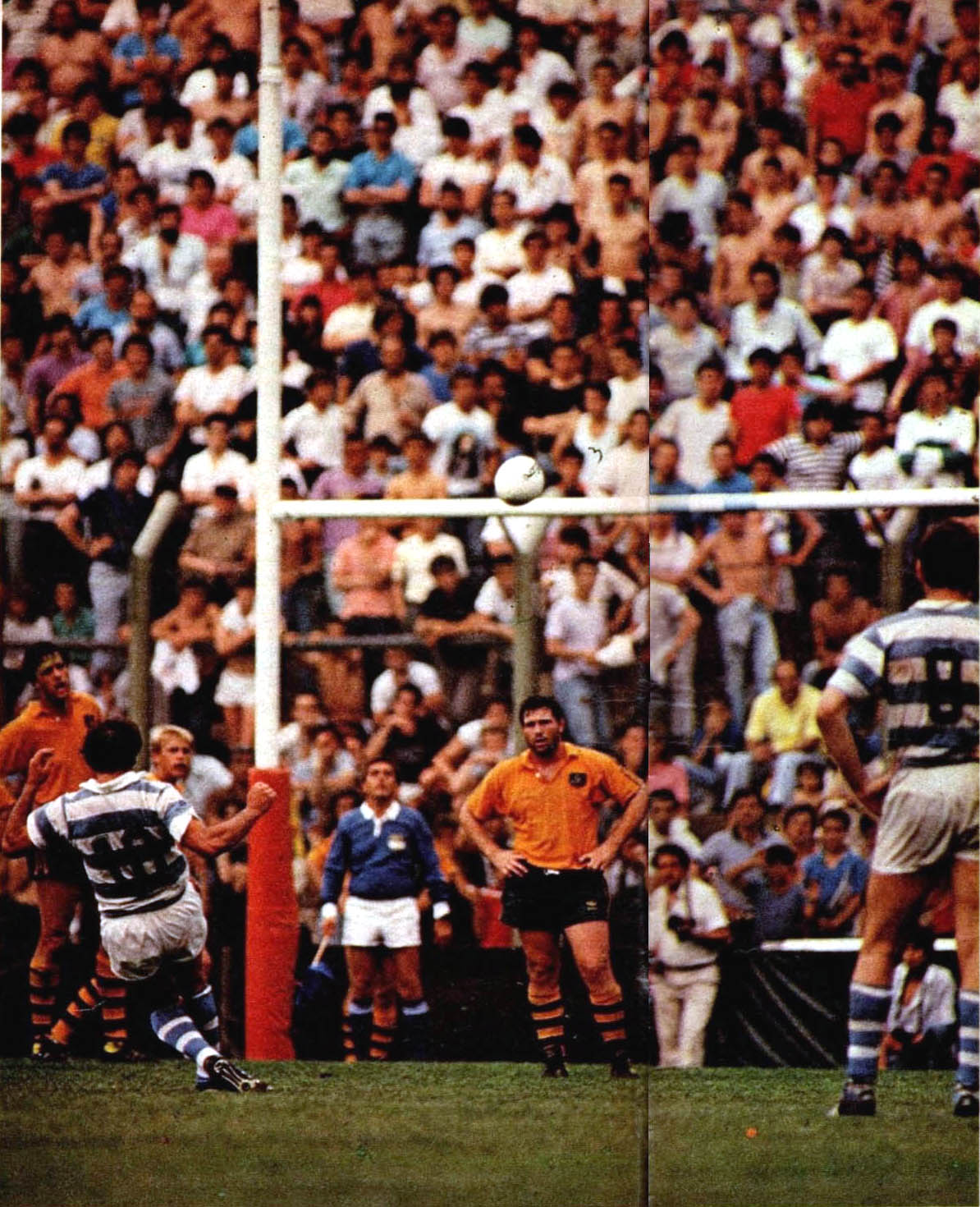
v Argentina
(1st test)

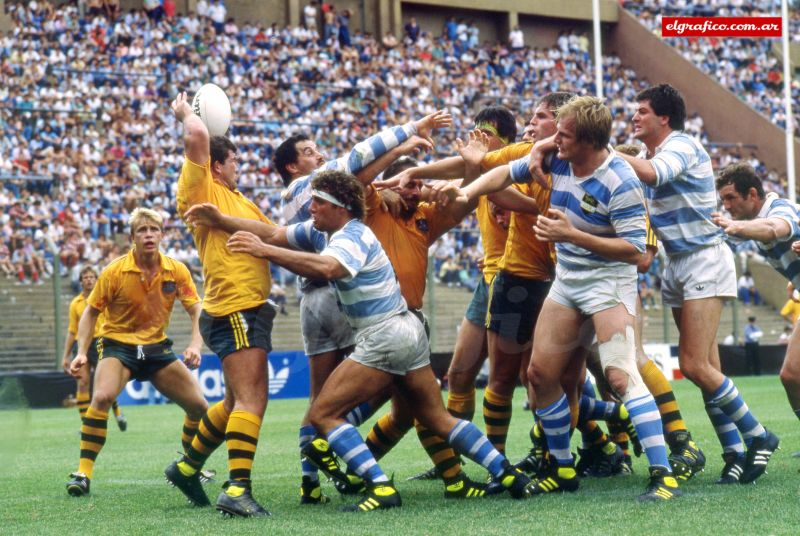
v Argentina
(2nd test)

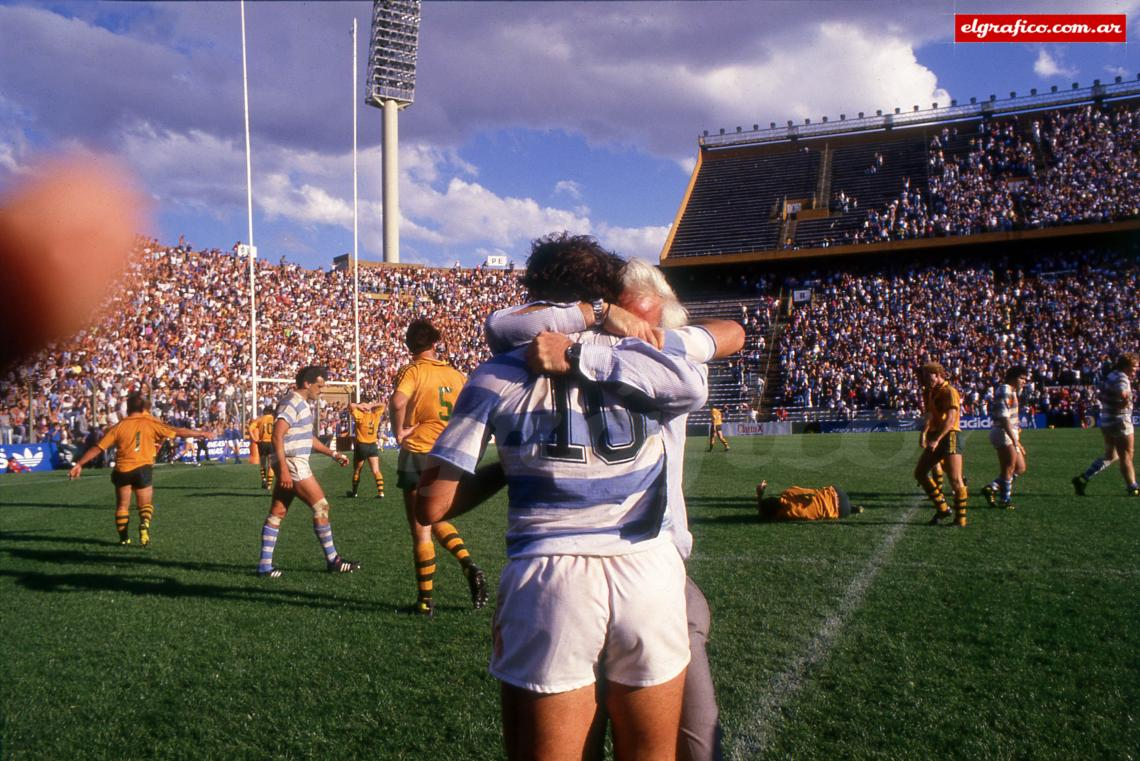
v Argentina
(2nd test)

== Bibliography ==
- Jones, Stephen, ed. (1988). Rothman's Rugby Union Yearbook 1988-89. Queen Anne Press. ISBN 0-3561-5884-5.
