= 1986 Argentina rugby union tour of Australia =

- Tour captain: Hugo Porta
Summary
P	W	D	L
Total
7	3	0	4
Test match
2	0	0	2
Opponent
P	W	D	L
Australia
2	0	0	2

The 1986 Argentina rugby union tour of Australia was a series of seven matches played by the Argentina national rugby union team in June and July 1986.

== Matches ==
22 June 1986

New South Wales Country	7 - 39	Argentina XV
Try: Callow; Pen: Vignes		Try: Annichini, P. Lanza; Cuesta Silva, B. Miguens; Schiavio, Turnes; Con: Porta 3 Pen: Porta 3

Graham Park, Gosford
Referee: David Kennedy

N.S.W. Country Grant; Bailey, Vignes, Parkes, Callow; Tonkin, McTaggart; Quilter, Cartes, Wansfora; Melrose, McKenzie; Torque, Hill, Tanner.
Argentina: B. Miguens (R. Madero); R. Annichini, D. Cuesta Silva, F. Turnes, P. Lanza; H. Porta (Capt.), F.Gómez; A. Schiavio, E. Ure, J. Allen; G. Milano, E. Branca; S. Dengra, J. Angelillo, D. Sanés.

25 June 1986

South Australia XV	19 - 38	Argentina XV
Try: penalty try, Cochrane; Con: Fidock; Pen: Fidock 3		Try: Ure 2, Annichini; Cash, Dinisio; J.Lanza, Patrono; Con: Madero 5

Hindmarsh, Adelaide
Referee: Brian Kinsey.

South Australian XV': Fidock; McAuliffe, Burke, Cook, Damu; G.Ella, Doughty; Dyjksman, Cochrane, Ball; Mc Dall, Harris; Mayhew, Palmer, Abraham (Fauster).
Argentina: R.Madero (Capt.); J.Lanza, G.Patrono, D.Cuesta Silva, R.Annichini; G.Gotummo, J, Miguens; T.Petérsen, E.Ure, P.Dinisio; E.Branca, J.Uriarte; I.Valessani, D.Flash, F.Morel.

28 June 1986

New South Wales	38 - 18	Argentina XV
Try: Burke, James; Reynolds, Williams; Con: Leeds 4 Pen: Leeds 2		Try: Allen, Turnes; Con: Madero 2 Pen: Porta 2

Concord Oval, Concord
Referee: Cal Waldron

New South Wales: Leeds; Williams, Burke, Owen, Vignes; James, Farr-Jones; Poidevin, Tuynman (Reynolds), Calcraft; Hall, Fitzsimons; Rodriguez, Palmer BuIlrrows.
Argentina : R.Madero; P.Lanza, F.Turnes, D.Cuesta Silva, J.Lanza; H.Porta (capt.) (G.Gotusso), F.Gómez; A.Schiavio, E.Ure, J.Allen; G.Milano, E.Branca; E.Valessani, D.Cash, S.Dengra.

1 June 1986

Queensland	59 - 9	Argentina XV
Try: Grigg 2, Martin 2 Gadner, Nasall; Miller, Moon; Slattery, Lynagh; Con: Lynagh 5 Pen: Lynagh 3 Drop: Lynagh		Pen: Madero 2 Drop: Turnes

Ballymore, Brisbane
Referee: Robert Fordham

Queensland: Martin; Grigg, Slack, Lane, Moon; Lynagh, Slattery; Nasall, Gadner, Miller; Campbell, Frawley; McIntyre, Lawton, Lilligan.
Argentina : B.Miguens; R.Annichini, D.Cuesta Silva.R.Madero (Capt.) P.Lanza; F.Turnés, J.Miguens; T.Pétersen, E.Ure, P.Dinisio; J.Uriarte, G.Milano; F.Morel, J.Angelillo, D.Sanés.

6 July 1986

Australia	39 - 19	Argentina
Try: Campes; Grigg, Papworth 2 Con: Lynagh 4 Pen: Lynagh 3		Try: Cuesta Silva; J Lanza, Turnes; Con: Madro, Porta; Pen: Porta

Ballymore, Brisbane
Attendance: 15.000
Referee: Jim Fleming (S.R.U.)

Australia			Argentina
David Campese	FB	15	FB	Bernardo Miguens
Peter Grigg	W	14	W	Juan Lanza
Matthew Burke	C	13	C	Diego Cuesta Silva
Brett Papworth	C	12	C	Fabian Turnes
Brendan Moon	W	11	W	Pedro Lanza
Michael Lynagh	FH	10	FH	Hugo Porta (capt.) (substituted off)
Nick Farr-Jones	SH	9	SH	Javier Miguens
Steve Tuynman	N8	8	N8	Ernesto Ure
David Codey	F	7	F	Tomas Petersen
(capt)Simon Poidevin	F	6	F	Jorge Allen
Bill Campbell	L	5	L	Eliseo Branca
Ross Reynolds	L	4	L	Gustavo Milano
Andy McIntyre	P	3	P	Eduardo Valesani
Tom Lawton	H	2	H	Diego Cash
Topo Rodriguez	P	1	P	Fernando Morel
		Replacements
		16	FH	Rafael Madero (substituted on)

9 July 1986

Queensland Country	6 - 41	Argentina XV
Pen: Randall		Try: J.Lanza 2, Schiavio; Cash, Madero, B.Miguens; Con: Madero 4 Pen: Madero 3

Rockhampton
Referee: John Oxenford

Queensland Country: King; Caswell, Bruce, Mannix, Cooper; Randall, Hayes; Needham, Bickley, McKay Becker, McGowan; O'Mara (Karia), Gordon, Fielding
Argentina : B.Miguens; J.Lanza, D.Cuesta Silva, G.Patrono, P.Lanza; R.Madero (Capt.), J.Miguens; A.Schiavio, G.Milano, J.Allen (P.Dinisio); J.Uriarte, E.Branca; E.Valessani, D.Cash, S.Dengra.

12 July 1986

Australia	26 - 00	Argentina
Try: Campese 2, Tuynman; Con: Lynagh; Pen: Lynagh 4

Sydney Cricket Ground, Sydney
Attendance: 19.000
Referee: Jim Fleming (S.R.U.)

Australia			Argentina
David Campese	FB	15	FB	Bernardo Miguens
Peter Grigg	W	14	W	Juan Lanza
Matthew Burke	C	13	C	Diego Cuesta Silva
Brett Papworth	C	12	C	Fabian Turnes
Brendan Moon	W	11	W	Pedro Lanza
Michael Lynagh	FH	10	FH	Rafael Madero (capt.)
Nick Farr-Jones	SH	9	SH	Javier Miguens
(substituted off) Steve Tuynman	N8	8	N8	Gustavo Milano
Bill Calcraft	F	7	F	Alejandro Schiavio
(capt.) Simon Poidevin	F	6	F	Jorge Allen
Bill Campbell	L	5	L	Eliseo Branca
Ross Reynolds	L	4	L	Joaquin Uriarte
Andy McIntyre	P	3	P	Eduardo Valesani
Tom Lawton	H	2	H	Diego Cash
Topo Rodriguez	P	1	P	Serafin Dengra
		Replacements
(substituted on) Damien Frawley	L	16

== Sources ==
- Union Argentina de Rugby (November 1986). "MEMORIA Temporada año 1986" (PDF) (in Spanish). Archived from the original (.doc) on 2012-11-01.
