= 1989 Argentina rugby union tour of New Zealand =

Summary
| P | W | D | L |
Total
| 9 | 4 | 0 | 5 |
Test match
| 2 | 0 | 0 | 2 |
Opponent
| P | W | D | L |
New Zealand
| 2 | 0 | 0 | 2 |

The 1989 Argentina rugby union tour of New Zealand was a series of nine matches played by the Argentina national rugby union team in July 1989.

== Matches ==
2 July 1989

| North Auckland | 16 - 22 | Argentina XV |
| Try: Ruddell; Pen: Johnson 4 | | Try: Milano, Di Nisio; Con: Baetti; Pen: Baetti 4 |

Okara Park, Whangārei
Referee: Geoff Smith (Hawke's Bay)

NORTH AUCKLAND: W.Johnson; K.Woodman, T.Brock, B.Kini, M.Seymour ( (substituted on) ) M.Younger; K.McQuilkin, C.Hull; N.Ruddell, W.Phillips, I.Jones; F.Lambourn, M.Budd; G.Courtney, M.Barry (Capt.), B.Le Clerc.
ARGENTINA: A.Scolni; M.Righentini, D.Cuesta Silva, M.Loffreda (capt.), M.Allen, C.Mendy; R.Madero, D.Baetti; P.Garretón, G.Milano, P.Di Nisio; M.Valesani, P.Buabse; D.Cash, R.Le Fort, S.Dengra.

5 July 1989

| King Country | 4 - 9 | Argentina XV |
| Try: Bradley | | Try: penalty try Con: Baetti; Pen: Baetti |

Owen Delany Park, Taupō
Referee: Lindsay McLachan (Otago)

KING COUNTRY : D.Perham; A.James, P.Coffin, H.Coffin, S.Bradley; N.Swain, H.Leach; C.Iti, G.Meads, G.Geffries; M.Johnson, R.Alve; G.Lethbourg, P.Mitchell, T.Stuart.
ARGENTINA: A.Scolni; M.Righentini, M.Loffreda (capt.), D.Cuesta Silva, C.Mendy; R.Madero, D.Baetti; P.Garretón, G.Milano ( (substituted on) 15' J.Uriarte), P.Di Nisio; P.Buabse, A.Iachetti; L.Molina, J.J.Angelillo, S.Dengra.

8 July 1989

| Auckland | 61 - 6 | Argentina XV |
| Try: Ridge 3, Iti 3 Wright 2, J.Kirwan; Z.Brooke; Con: Fox 9 Pen: Fox | | Try: Di Nisio; Con: Baetti |

Eden Park, Auckland
Referee: S.Bishop (Canterbury)

AUCKLAND:Pi.Ridge; J.Kirwan, J.Stanley, B.McCahill, T.Wright; G.Fox, B.Iti; M.Jones, Z.Brooke, A.Whetton; G.Whetton; M.Brooke; O.Brown, M.Dowd, P.Fatialofa.
ARGENTINA:A.Scolni; D.Cuesta Silva, M.Loffreda (capt.), F.Turnes, G.Mendy ( (substituted on) M.Righentini); R.Madero, D.Baetti; P.Di Nisio, J.Uriarte, P.Garretón; P.Buabse, A.Iachetti; D.Cash, J.J.Angelillo, S.Dengra.

11 July 1989

| Wairarapa | 4 - 22 | Argentina XV |
| Try: Foster | | Try: Baeck, Cuesta Silva 2 Mendy, penalty try Con: Domínguez |

Memorial Park, Masterton
Referee: Colin Hawke (S. Canterbury)

WAIRARAPA-BUSH: C.Pepperell; M.Foster, P.Bresaz, H.Reedy, D.Rutene; G.Gray, B.Lett (capt.); L.Christiansen, G.Hawkins ( (substituted on) G.Richardson', G.Rolston; P.Berry, P.Smith; C.Kapene, C.Lett, B.Styles.c
ARGENTINA: S.Salvat; D.Cuesta Silva, F.Turnes, M.Allen, C.Mendy; D.Dominguez, F.Gómez; M.Baeck, G.Milano (capt.), M.Bertranou; A.Iachetti, M.Valesani; L.Molina, R.Le Fort, A.Rocca.

15 July 1989

| New Zealand | 60 - 9 | Argentina |
| Try: Gallaher 3, Jones 2 Wright 2, Kirwan 2 penalty try Con: Fox 7 Pen: Fox 2 | | Try: Turnes; Con: Baetti; Pen: Baetti |

Carisbrook, Dunedin
Attendance: 22.000
Referee: Clive Norling (W.R.U.)

| New Zealand | | | Argentina |
| John Gallagher | FB | 15 | FB | Alejandro Scolni |
| John Kirwan | W | 14 | W | Cristian Mendy |
| (substituted off) 68' Joe Stanley | C | 13 | C | Marcelo Loffreda (capt.) |
| (substituted off) 76' John Schuster | C | 12 | C | Fabian Turnes |
| Terry Wright | W | 11 | W | Diego Cuesta Silva |
| Grant Fox | FH | 10 | FH | Rafael Madero |
| Bruce Deans | SH | 9 | SH | Daniel Baetti |
| (capt.) Buck Shelford | N8 | 8 | N8 | Gustavo Milano |
| Michael Jones | F | 7 | F | Pablo di Nisio |
| Alan Whetton | F | 6 | F | Miguel Bertranou |
| Gary Whetton | L | 5 | L | Marcelo Valesani |
| Murray Pierce | L | 4 | L | Pablo Buabse |
| Richard Loe | P | 3 | P | Luis Molina |
| Sean Fitzpatrick | H | 2 | H | Diego Cash |
| Steve McDowall | P | 1 | P | Serafin Dengra |
| | | Replacements |
| (substituted on) 68' Bernie McCahill | C | 16 | | Adrian Rocca |
| (substituted on) 76' Frano Botica | C | 17 | | Ricardo le Fort |
| Graeme Bachop | | 18 | | Joaquin Uriarte |
| Zinzan Brooke | | 19 | | Fabio Gomez |
| Ron Williams | | 20 | | Marcelo Righentini |
| Warren Gatland | | 21 | | Juan Soler Valls |

19 July 1989

| Hanan Shield XV | 6 - 17 | Argentina XV |
| Pen: Fairbrother; Drop: Fairbrother | | Try: Baeck; Righentini, Iachetti; Con: Dominguez; Pen: Dominguez |

Fraser Park, Timaru
Referee: T.Marshall (Canterbury)

HANAN SHIELD XV: A.Stevenson; G.Frew, P.Ryan, C.Dorgan, S.Tarrant; B.Faírbrother, B.Matthews; J.Cook, J, Simpson, D.Ineson; P.Cockburn, W.Frew; J.Harrison, L.McDonald (capt.), R.Morgan.
ARGENTINA: J.Soler; D.Cuesta Silva, M.Loffreda (capt.), P.Garzón ( (substituted on) 70' M.Allen), M.Righentini; D.Dominguez, F.Silvestre; M.Baeck, J, Uriarte, P.Garretón; J.Simes, A.Iachetti; L.Molina, R.Le Fort, S, Dengra.

22 July 1989

| Canterbury | 33 - 16 | Argentina XV |
| Try: Deans, S.Bachop; Maunsell, Bale; Con: Deans 4 Pen: Deans 3 | | Try: Gómez 3 Con: Madero, Turnes |

Lancaster Park, Christchurch
Referee: Keith Lawrence

CANTERBURY: R.Deans; P, Bale, A.McCormick, W.Maunsell, W.Taylor; S.Bachop, G.Bachop; R.Penney, J.Jackson, M.Henderson; A.Anderson (capt.), A.Earl; K.Hill, J.Buchan, C.Earl.
ARGENTINA: S.Salvat; D.Cuesta Silva, M.Loffreda (capt.), F.Turnes, A.Scolni, R.Madero, F.Gómez; P.Di Nisio, G.Milano, P.Garretón; A.Iachetti, J.Uriarte; D.Cash, J.J.Angelillo, A.Rocca.

25 July 1989

| Waikato | 30 - 12 | Argentina XV |
| Try: Putt 2, Craies; Coventry; Con: Craies 4 Pen: Craies 2 | | Try: Cuesta Silva, Bertranou; Con: Baetti 2 |

Rugby Park, Hamilton
Referee: R.Soppet (Counties)

WAIKATO: D.Halligan; W.Jennings, A.Strawbridge, R.McIntosh, P.Simonsson; B.Craies, K.Putt; D.Monkley, J.Mitchell, T.Coventry; B.Anderson, R.Jerram; G.Purvis, W.Batland, R.Loe.
ARGENTINA: S.Salvat; M.Righentini, M.Loffreda (capt.) ( (substituted on) 60' A.Scolni), F.Turnes, D.Cuesta Silva; R.Madero, D.Baetti; M.Bertranou, J.Uriarte ( (substituted on) 46' G.Milano, M.Baeck; M.Valesani, P.Buabse; L.Molina; R.Le Fort, S.Dengra.

29 July 1989

| New Zealand | 49 - 12 | Argentina |
| Try: Deans 2, Wright 2 A.Whetton, Gallagher; Kirwan; Con: Fox 6 Pen: Fox 3 | | Try: Dengra; Con: Baetti; Pen: Turnes 2 |

Athletic Park, Wellington
Attendance: 22.000
Referee: Clive Norling (W.R.U.)

| New Zealand | | | Argentina |
| John Gallagher | FB | 15 | FB | Sebastian Salvat |
| John Kirwan | W | 14 | W | Cristian Mendy |
| Joe Stanley | C | 13 | C | Diego Cuesta Silva |
| (substituted off) 29' John Schuster | C | 12 | C | Fabian Turnes |
| Terry Wright | W | 11 | W | Marcelo Righentini |
| Grant Fox | FH | 10 | FH | Rafael Madero |
| Bruce Deans | SH | 9 | SH | Daniel Baetti (capt.) (substituted off) 16' |
| (capt.) Buck Shelford | N8 | 8 | N8 | Gustavo Milano |
| (substituted off) 58' Michael Jones | F | 7 | F | Miguel Bertranou |
| Alan Whetton | F | 6 | F | Pablo Garreton |
| Gary Whetton | L | 5 | L | Alejandro Iachetti |
| Murray Pierce | L | 4 | L | Marcelo Valesani |
| Richard Loe | P | 3 | P | Diego Cash |
| Sean Fitzpatrick | H | 2 | H | Juan Jose Angelillo |
| Steve McDowall | P | 1 | P | Serafin Dengra |
| | | Replacements |
| (substituted on) 58' Zinzan Brooke | N8 | | SH | Fabio Gomez (substituted on) 16' |
| (substituted on) 29' Bernie McCahill | C |

== Sources ==
- Union Argentina de Rugby (December 1989). "MEMORIA Temporada año 1989" (PDF) (in Spanish). Archived from the original (.doc) on 2012-11-01.
