= 1980 Fiji rugby union tour of Argentina =

Rugby matches disputed by the Fijian National Team

- Date: Oct–Nov 1980
Summary
P	W	D	L
Total
7	4	0	3
Test match
2	0	0	2
Opponent
P	W	D	L
Argentina
2	0	0	2

The 1980 Fiji rugby union tour of Argentina was a series of matches played between October and November by the Fiji national rugby union team in Argentina.

It was the first visit of a rugby union team from Polynesia to Argentina.

== Matches ==
=== Summary ===
List of matches played by Fiji in Argentina: Test matches

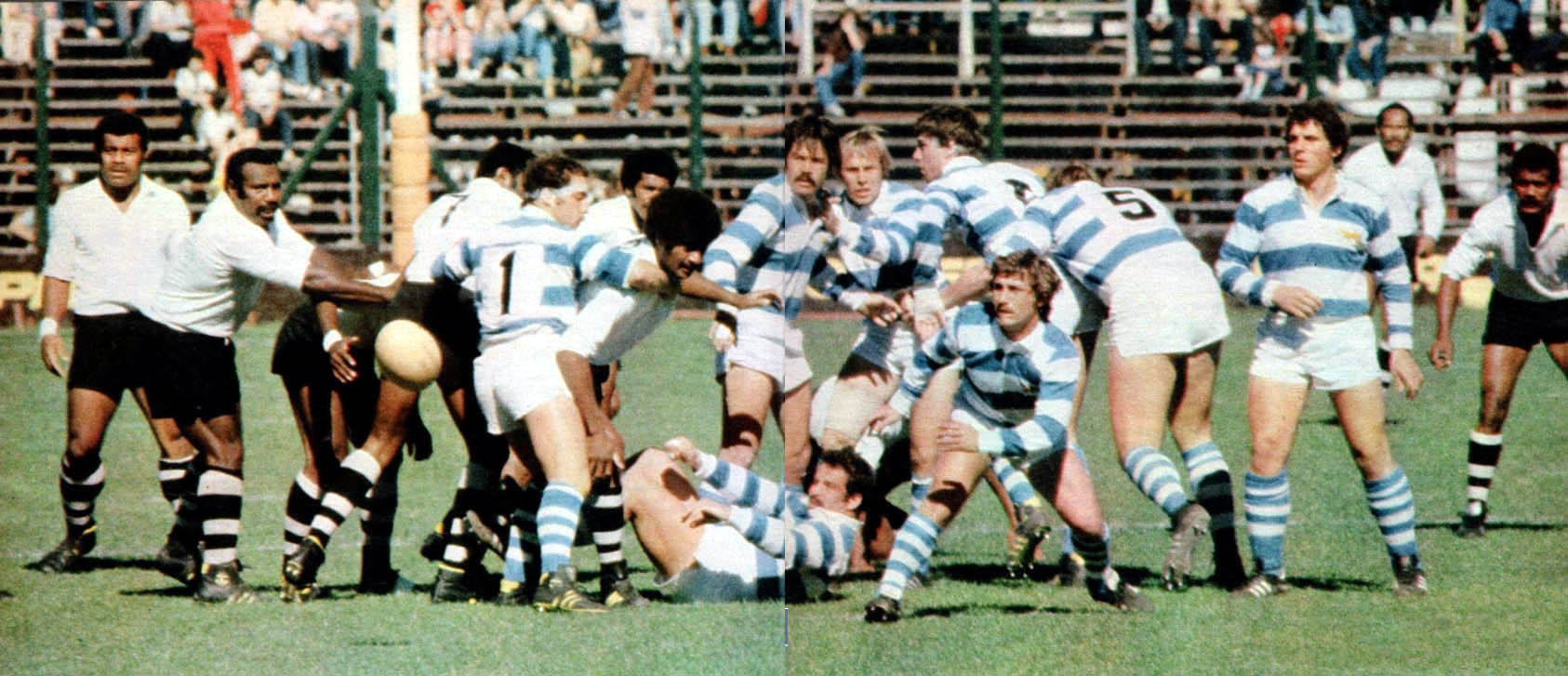
Fiji v Argentina, test match at Ferro C. Oeste

#	Date	Rival	Res.	Sco.	City	Venue
1	18 Oct	Argentina B	W	23–19	Buenos Aires	Ferro C. Oeste Stadium
2	21 Oct	Tucumán	W	24–9	San Miguel	Atlético Concepción Stadium
3	25 Oct	San Isidro Club	L	11–28	Buenos Aires	Ferro C. Oeste Stadium
4	18 Oct	Seleccionado de Cuyo	W	84–18	San Juan	n/a
5	1 Nov	Argentina	L	22–34	Buenos Aires	Ferro C. Oeste Stadium
6	4 Nov	Santa Fe	W	63–12	Santa Fe	n/a
7	8 Nov	Argentina	L	16–38	Buenos Aires	Ferro C. Oeste Stadium

=== Details ===
18 Oct 1980

Argentina B	19–23	Fiji
Try: Puccio; Pen: Piccardo (5)	Report	Try: Vatuwaliwali, Retudradra, Lutumeilegi, Uluvula; Con: Vuetaki (2); Drop: Uustaki

Ferro Carril Oeste, Buenos Aires
Attendance: 5,000
Referee: Douglas Kerr (ARG)

Argentina "B": Guillermo Varone; Alejandro Puccio, Guillermo Sanguinetti, G.Lorenzo, Eduardo Sanguinetti; Juan Pablo Piccardo (capt.), Andrés Nicholson; G.Milano, O.Bracaccini, G.Antonini (G.García) Miguel Glastra, E.Branca; Juan Aguilar (Crevero), Javier Pérez Cobo, Carlos Sainz Trápaga.
Fiji S.Vuetaki; S.Laulau, S.Wakabaca, K.Vosailigi, M.Yakalevu; R.Nakiyoyo, S.Viriviri (capt-); I.Lutumaillagi, E.Raturdradra, E.Draniikmate; V.Vatuwaliwali, N.Uluvula; P.Mina.S.Seru, J.Rauto.

21 Oct 1980

Tucumán	9–24	Fiji
Pen: L.Ferro (3)		Try: Makutu (3); Lutumailegi; Senigakali; Con: Waisake (2)

Atlético Concepción, S.M. de Tucumán
Referee: Felipe Ferrari (ARG)

Tucumán: A.Beckwedel; P.Zelarrayán, L.Ferro, C.Imbert, J.Williams; Ricardo Sauze, G.Palau; Molina (C.Paz), H.Cabrera. R.Pacheco; J.De Luego R.Forro; P.Sastre, Jorge Posse, Topo Rodríguez.
Fiji: P.Kewa; T.Makutu, K.Yakalevu, J.Ratu, S.Wakabaca; N.Senilagakali, P.P.Waisake; I.Lutumeilagi, E.Retudradra, I.Finau; V.Vatuwalili, I.Cerelala; J.Revouvou, J.Rautu (capt.).M.Tamata.

25 Oct 1980

San Isidro Club	28–11	Fiji
Try: F. Seinz Trápaga, 1 penalty try Petersen; Pen: Loffreda (3); Drop: F. Seinz Trápaga		Try: Yakalevu; Seru; Pen: Vuetaki

Ferro Carril Oeste, Buenos Aires
Referee: Roberto Magnani (ARG)

San Isidro Club: F.Argerich; Mario Walther (capt.), F.Sainz Trápaga, Marcelo Loffreda, L.Corral; Rafael Madero, F.Aguirre; Tomás Petersen, Roberto Lucke, Ricardo de Vedia; MiguelGlastra, C.Durlech; Fernando Insúa, Javier Pérez Cobo, Carlos Sainz Trápaga.
Fiji:L.Vuetski; T.Makutu, J.Retu, K, Yakalevu, S.Wakabaca; N.Senilagakali, Samisoni Viriviri (capt.); Iokimi Finau, E.Retudradra, I.Lutumellegi; V.Vatuwaliwali, N.Uluvula; J.Revouvou, S.Seru, J.Rauto.

28 Oct 1980

Seleccionado de Cuyo	18–84	Fiji
Try: Guarrochena (2); Con: Guarrochena (2); Drop: Guarrochena (2)		Try: Ravouvoul; Cerelela (2); Laulsu (4); Makutu (2); Vosailigi (2); Tameta (2); Kewa (2), Ratu; Con: Retu (2); Waiaake (10)

?, San Juan
Referee: Ricardo Colombo (ARG)

Seleccionado Regional de Cuyo: Ricardo Muñiz; R.Herce, F.Ruffo, C.Cipitelli, F.Ruffo; de Cuyo, Pablo Guarrochena, P.Basile; M.Orrico, C.Quiroga, G.Antonini; D.Veira, S.Fabbi; A.Diez, L.Crivelli, P.Martín.
Fiji: P.Kewe; Sanivalati Laulau, K.Vosailigi, J.Retu, T.Makutu; Nakiyoyo, P.Waiaake; Samisoni Viriviri, E.Retudradra, Finau, J.Revouvou, Cerelala; S.Navatu, M.Tameta, J.Rauto

1 Nov 1980

Argentina	34–22	Fiji
Try: Cappelletti (3); Travaglini; Loffreda; Cubellii; Con: Porta (2); Pen: Porta (2)		Try: Finau (2); Uluvula; Vacalevu; Con: Ratu (3)

Ferro Carril Oeste, Buenos Aires
Referee: Lawrie Prideaux (ENG)

Team details

Argentina	Fiji

Daniel Baetti	FB	15	FB	Lemeki Vuetaki
Martín Samsot	W	14	W	Tevita Makutu
Rafael Madero	C	13	C	Sanivalati Laulau
Marcelo Loffreda	C	12	C	Kini Vosailagi
Adolfo Cappelletti	W	11	W	Jone Ratu
Hugo Porta (c)	FH	10	FH	Navitalai Senilagakali
Tomás Landajo	SH	9	SH	Samisoni Viriviri (c)
Gabriel Travaglini	N8	8	N8	Eneri Ratudradra (substituted off)
Ernesto Ure	F	6	F	Iokimi Finau
Tomás Petersen	F	7	F	Vikikesa Vatuwaliwali
Alejandro Iachetti	L	5	L	Nasoni Uluvula
Eliseo Branca	L	4	L	Isimeli Cerelala
Topo Rodriguez	P	3	P	Joketani Ravouvou
Javier Pérez Cobo	H	2	H	Peceli Kina
Fernando Morel	P	1	P	Josefa Rauto
		Substitutions
			F	Ilami Lutumailagi (substituted on)

4 Nov 1980

Santa Fe	12–63	Fiji
Try: Milano; Con: Riestra; Pen: Vueteki		Try: Nekiyoyo, Waqaba (3); Finau, Lutumallagi (2); Cerelela; Yakelevu; Lutumallagi; Con: Vueteki (10)

?, Santa Fe
Referee: Bruno Bertelli (ARG)

Santa Fé: Iturraspe; Maggin, Pelosso, Riestra, Sossman; Del Sastre, Petter; Gallo, Gustavo Milano, Gozarelli; Melano, Patrizzi Dalla Fontana, Ruiz Diez (Della Torre), Benitez.(Riestra).
Fiji: L.Vueteki; S.Wagabaca, Sanivalati Lallau, K.Vakelevu, K.Vasailagi; Nekiyoyo, P. Waisake; I. Lutumailagi, Iokimi Finau; I.Cerelala, J.Revouvou; S.Novatu, M.Tamata, J.Rauto, V.Vatuwaliwali.

8 Nov 1980

Argentina	38–16	Fiji
Try: Travaglini (2); Cappelletti (2); Pérez Cabo; Raetti; Con: Porta; Pen: Porta (2)		Try: Finau; Lutumailagi; Con: Vueteki; Pen: Vueteki

Ferro Carril Oeste, Buenos Aires
Referee: Lawrie Prideaux (ENG)

Team details

Argentina	Fiji

Daniel Baetti	FB	15	FB	Lemeki Vuetaki
Marcelo Campo	W	14	W	Tevita Makutu
Rafael Madero	C	13	C	Sanivalati Laulau
Marcelo Loffreda	C	12	C	Kini Vosailagi
Adolfo Cappelletti	W	11	W	Jone Ratu
Hugo Porta (c)	FH	10	FH	Navitalai Senilagakali
Tomás Landajo	SH	9	SH	Samisoni Viriviri (c)
Gabriel Travaglini	N8	8	N8	Eneri Ratudradra (substituted off)
Carlos Serrano	F	6	F	Iokimi Finau
Tomás Petersen	F	7	F	Vikikesa Vatuwaliwali
Alejandro Iachetti	L	5	L	Nasoni Uluvula
Ernesto Ure	L	4	L	Isimeli Cerelala
Fernando Morel	P	3	P	Joketani Ravouvou
Alejandro Cubelli	H	2	H	Peceli Kina
Topo Rodriguez	P	1	P	Josefa Rauto
		Substitutions
			C	Kameli Nayacalevu (substituted on)
