= 1987 Korea rugby union tour of Australia =

Summary
P	W	D	L
Total
5	0	0	5
Test match
1	0	0	1
Opponent
P	W	D	L
Australia
1	0	0	1

The 1987 Korea rugby union tour of Australia was a series of five matches played by the Korea national rugby union team in Australia in 1987. The Korea team lost all five of their five matches, including the international match against the Australia national rugby union team.

== Matches ==
Scores and results list Korea's points tally first.

Opposing Team	Score		Date	Venue	Status	Reports	
Opposing Team	For	Against	Date	Venue	Status	Preview	Match
N.S.W. 'B'	33	34	1987		Tour match		
New South Wales Country	23	44	May 6, 1987	Gosford	Tour match		
Australian Capital Territory	15	58	May 10, 1987	Canberra	Tour match		
Queensland 'B'	24	9	1987		Tour match		
Australia	18	65	May 17, 1987	Ballymore, Brisbane	Test Match		

== Test matches ==
=== Australia ===
17 May 1987

Australia	65 – 18	South Korea
(17 - 5g, 1pg, 1t) B. Smith (12 - 3t) M. Burke (8 - 2t) P. Grigg (8 - 2t) A. Slack (4 - 1t) M. Cook (4 - 1t) R. Gould (4 - 1t) J. Miller (4 - 1t) N. Farr-Jones (4 - 1t) S. James	Report	Chang-Kyu Sin (10 - 2g, 2pg); Yun-Pil Jung (4 - 1t); Seung-Ho Baek (4 - 1t)

Ballymore, Brisbane
Attendance: 4,000
Referee: Col Waldron (ARU)

Notes:

- Anthony Herbert, Steve James & Brian Smith made their full international debuts for Australia in this match.
