= 1983 Australia rugby union tour of Italy and France =

Summary
P	W	D	L
Total
11	6	2	3
Test match
3	1	1	1
Opponent
P	W	D	L
Italy
1	1	0	0
France
2	0	1	1

The 1983 Australia rugby union tour of Italy and France was a series of matches played between October and November 1983 in Italy and France by Australia.

== Results ==
Scores and results list Australia's points tally first.

Opposing Team	For	Against	Date	Venue	Status
Italy B	26	0	16 October 1983		Tour match
Italy	29	7	22 October 1983	Rovigo	Test match
French Selection	19	16	26 October 1983	Strasbourg	Tour match
French Police	15	15	29 October 1983	Le Creusot	Tour match
French Selection	27	7	1 November 1983	Grenoble	Tour match
French Selection	9	15	5 November 1983	Perpignan	Tour match
French Selection	6	36	9 November 1983	Agen	Tour match
France	15	15	13 November 1983	Clermont Ferrand	Test match
French Army	16	10	16 November 1983	La Rochelle	Tour match
France	6	15	19 November 1983	Parc des Princes, Paris	Test match
French Barbarians	23	21	23 November 1983	Toulon	Tour match

== Touring party ==
- Manager - Chilla Wilson
- Coach - Bob Dwyer
- Captain - Mark Ella

=== Backs ===
- David Campese
- Gary Ella
- Glen Ella
- Mark Ella
- Roger Gould
- Ross Hanley
- Michael Hawker
- Tim Lane
- Michael Lynagh
- Brendan Moon
- Tony Parker
- Andrew Slack
- Dominic Vaughan

=== Forwards ===
- John Coolican
- Rod Crerar
- Steve Cutler
- Duncan Hall
- Ollie Hall
- Mark Harding
- David Hillhouse
- Nigel Holt
- Tom Lawton
- Mark McBain
- Andy McIntyre
- Jeff Miller
- Simon Poidevin
- Chris Roche
- Steve Tuynman
- Steve Williams
