= History of rugby union matches between Argentina and Australia =

The Australian Wallabies and Argentina, otherwise known as Los Pumas have a rugby union rivalry dating back to 27 October 1979.

The teams have met forty-three times, with Australia winning thirty, Argentina winning ten and three matches drawn. Three of the matches have taken place in the Rugby World Cup; two pool matches, in 1991 and 2003, and a semi-final in 2015. Australia have won all three Rugby World Cup matches.

The Puma Trophy was established in 2000 as a perpetual trophy between the two nations. The Pumas won it for the first time in 2023.

The Wallabies are the national side with whom the Pumas have drawn the most, with three draws in their history. In 2024, the Wallabies shipped 67 points against the Pumas, the most they have ever conceded in test history.

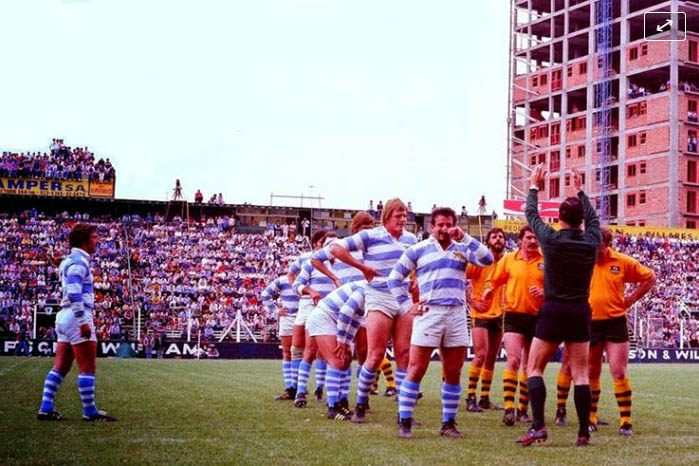
Match between Argentina and Australia in Buenos Aires, 1979

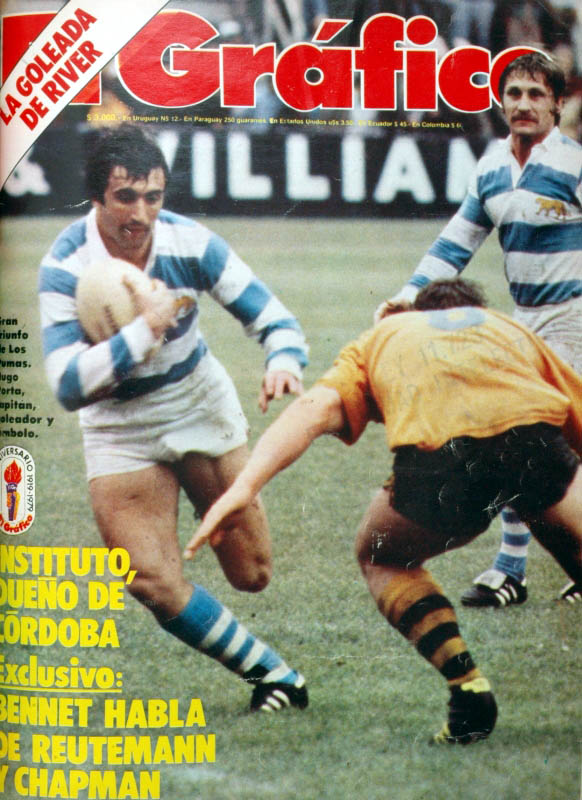
30 October 1979 edition of El Gráfico

== Summary ==
As of 6 September 2026.

=== Overall ===
Details	Played	Won by Argentina	Won by Australia	Drawn	Argentina points	Australia points
In Argentina	18	6	11	2	460	496
In Australia	23	4	17	2	381	649
Neutral venue	3	0	3	0	55	94
Overall	44	10	31	4	886	1,239

=== Records ===
Note: Date shown in brackets indicates when the record was or last set.

Record	Argentina	Australia
Longest winning streak	2 (13 August 2022 – 31 August 2024)	9 (17 June 2000 – 4 October 2014)
Largest points for
Home	67 (7 September 2024)	53 (30 April 1995; 17 June 2000)
Away	34 (15 July 2023)	54 (5 October 2013)
Largest winning margin
Home	40 (7 September 2024)	47 (17 June 2000)
Away	15 (31 July 1983)	37 (5 October 2013)

== Results ==
No.	Date	Venue	Score	Winner	Competition
1	27 October 1979	Ferro Carril Oeste, Buenos Aires	24–13	Argentina	1979 Australia tour of Argentina
2	3 November 1979	Ferro Carril Oeste, Buenos Aires	12–17	Australia	1979 Australia tour of Argentina
3	31 July 1983	Ballymore Stadium, Brisbane	3–18	Argentina	1983 Argentina tour of Australia
4	7 August 1983	Sydney Cricket Ground, Sydney	29–13	Australia	1983 Argentina tour of Australia
5	6 July 1986	Ballymore Stadium, Brisbane	39–19	Australia	1986 Argentina tour of Australia
6	12 July 1986	Sydney Cricket Ground, Sydney	26–0	Australia	1986 Argentina tour of Australia
7	31 October 1987	José Amalfitani Stadium, Buenos Aires	19–19	draw	1987 Australia tour of Argentina and Paraguay
8	7 November 1987	José Amalfitani Stadium, Buenos Aires	27–19	Argentina	1987 Australia tour of Argentina and Paraguay
9	4 October 1991	Stradey Park, Llanelli (Wales)	32–19	Australia	1991 Rugby World Cup
10	30 April 1995	Ballymore Stadium, Brisbane	53–7	Australia	1995 Argentina tour of Australia
11	6 May 1995	Sydney Football Stadium, Sydney	30–13	Australia	1995 Argentina tour of Australia
12	1 November 1997	Ferro Carril Oeste, Buenos Aires	15–23	Australia	1997 Australia tour of Argentina and Great Britain
13	8 November 1997	Ferro Carril Oeste, Buenos Aires	18–16	Argentina	1997 Australia tour of Argentina and Great Britain
14	17 June 2000	Ballymore Stadium, Brisbane	53–6	Australia	2000 Argentina tour of Australia
15	24 June 2000	Canberra Stadium, Canberra	32–25	Australia	2000 Argentina tour of Australia
16	2 November 2002	Estadio Monumental, Buenos Aires	6–17	Australia	2002 Australia tour of Argentina and Europe
17	10 October 2003	Stadium Australia, Sydney	24–8	Australia	2003 Rugby World Cup
18	15 September 2012	Robina Stadium, Gold Coast	23–19	Australia	2012 Rugby Championship
19	6 October 2012	Estadio Gigante de Arroyito, Rosario	19–25	Australia	2012 Rugby Championship
20	14 September 2013	Subiaco Oval, Perth	14–13	Australia	2013 Rugby Championship
21	5 October 2013	Estadio Gigante de Arroyito, Rosario	17–54	Australia	2013 Rugby Championship
22	13 September 2014	Robina Stadium, Gold Coast	32–25	Australia	2014 Rugby Championship
23	4 October 2014	Estadio Malvinas Argentinas, Mendoza	21–17	Argentina	2014 Rugby Championship
24	25 July 2015	Estadio Malvinas Argentinas, Mendoza	9–34	Australia	2015 Rugby Championship
25	25 October 2015	Twickenham Stadium, London (England)	15–29	Australia	2015 Rugby World Cup
26	17 September 2016	Perth Rectangular Stadium, Perth	36–20	Australia	2016 Rugby Championship
27	8 October 2016	Twickenham Stadium, London (England)	21–33	Australia	2016 Rugby Championship
28	16 September 2017	Canberra Stadium, Canberra	45–20	Australia	2017 Rugby Championship
29	7 October 2017	Estadio Malvinas Argentinas, Mendoza	20–37	Australia	2017 Rugby Championship
30	15 September 2018	Robina Stadium, Gold Coast	19–23	Argentina	2018 Rugby Championship
31	6 October 2018	Estadio Padre Ernesto Martearena, Salta	34–45	Australia	2018 Rugby Championship
32	27 July 2019	Lang Park, Brisbane	16–10	Australia	2019 Rugby Championship
33	21 November 2020	Newcastle International Sports Centre, Newcastle	15–15	draw	2020 Tri Nations Series
34	5 December 2020	Western Sydney Stadium, Sydney	16–16	draw	2020 Tri Nations Series
35	25 September 2021	North Queensland Stadium, Townsville	27–8	Australia	2021 Rugby Championship
36	2 October 2021	Robina Stadium, Gold Coast	32–17	Australia	2021 Rugby Championship
37	6 August 2022	Estadio Malvinas Argentinas, Mendoza	26–41	Australia	2022 Rugby Championship
38	13 August 2022	Estadio San Juan del Bicentenario, San Juan	48–17	Argentina	2022 Rugby Championship
39	15 July 2023	Western Sydney Stadium, Sydney	31–34	Argentina	2023 Rugby Championship
40	31 August 2024	Estadio Jorge Luis Hirschi, La Plata	19–20	Australia	2024 Rugby Championship
41	7 September 2024	Estadio Brigadier General Estanislao López, Santa Fe	67–27	Argentina	2024 Rugby Championship
42	6 September 2025	North Queensland Stadium, Townsville	28–24	Australia	2025 Rugby Championship
43	13 September 2025	Sydney Football Stadium, Sydney	26–28	Argentina	2025 Rugby Championship
44	29 August 2026	Estadio 23 de Agosto, San Salvador de Jujuy	21–27	Australia	2026 Australia tour of Argentina
45	5 September 2026	Estadio Malvinas Argentinas, Mendoza	28–28	draw	2026 Australia tour of Argentina
46	10 July 2027	Sydney Football Stadium, Sydney	TBD		2027 Rugby Championship
47	17 July 2027	North Queensland Stadium, Townsville	TBD		2027 Rugby Championship

== List of series ==
Played	Won by Argentina	Won by Australia	Drawn
8	1	4	3

Year	Argentina	Australia	Series winner	Puma Trophy
1979	1	1	Draw	Not contested
1983	1	1	Draw	Not contested
1986	0	2	Australia	Not contested
1987	1½	½	Argentina	Not contested
1995	0	2	Australia	Not contested
1997	1	1	Draw	Not contested
2000	0	2	Australia	
2026	½	1½	Australia	
