= Epping Rugby & Netball Club =

Australian sports club, based in Epping, NSW

Epping Rams
- Full name: Epping Rams Rugby Club
- Nickname: Rams
- Founded: 1930's (as Epping Juniors) 1960 (senior club founded)
- Location: Epping, Sydney, Australia
- Ground(s): Somerville Park, Blaxland Rd, Epping
- Coach: Nathan Harvey
- Captain: Todd Palmer
- League(s): NSW Suburban Rugby; Eastwood Ryde Netball Association
- 2023: 4th (NSWSRU 1st Grade, 2nd Div)
Team kit

Official website
- www.eppingrams.com

Epping Rugby and Netball Club is a sports club, based in Epping, New South Wales. The senior rugby division of the club plays in the 2nd division of New South Wales Suburban Rugby Union, while the Rams Netball club plays in the Eastwood Ryde Netball Association competitions.

== History ==
The Epping Rugby Club started in the 1930s as Epping Juniors, giving juniors in the Epping area a chance to play rugby.

Since their inception, there have been a number of future international rugby players played for Epping's juniors. These include:

- Steve Tuynman - Australia
- Matthew Burke - Australia
- Brett Papworth - Australia
- Lachlan Turner - Australia
- Matt Mostyn - Ireland
- Ian Williams Australia/Japan

Epping added a Netball Club to the Epping Rams in 2001, competing in the Eastwood Ryde Netball Association.

In 2015, the junior club merged with Hillview Junior Rugby Club to form Central Eastwood. Epping's last season in junior rugby was in 2016, with a single team representing the club.

=== Senior Rugby ===
==== Epping Juniors senior rugby club ====
In 1960, former junior players with the Epping Rugby Club formed the Epping Juniors suburban rugby club. Epping Juniors played in various divisions of Suburban Rugby through until 1991, winning only one premiership, the 1986 Walker Cup, before folding. A schism occurred in the late 1980s, which resulted in some members joining another local Suburban Rugby Club, the Cavaliers. Upon folding, some remaining members joined Lane Cove, ensuring a healthy rivalry between the clubs.

==== The Cavaliers ====
The Cavaliers started as Eastwood Methodist in the early 1970s in Sydney's Protestant Church rugby competition. They joined Suburban Rugby as Roslea in the late 1970s, before changing their name to the Cavaliers in the 1980s. The Cavaliers won one Suburban premiership, winning the Grose Cup (2nd Grade) in 1992.

==== Epping Rams Seniors Restart ====
In 1997, the Cavaliers were invited to join the Epping Rams, as the senior club, and immediately scored success, by winning the Grose Cup (4th Division, 2nd Grade). In 2000, the Epping Rams seniors were promoted to 3rd Division, and won the Clark Cup (3rd Division, 1st Grade) premiership the following year, in 2001.

Following a Campbell Cup (3rd Division, 3rd Grade) premiership in 2004, the Epping Rams had a great year in 2005. After securing the 3rd Division Club Championship, Epping's 1st, 2nd and 3rd grade sides all made grand finals, with the 1st grade (Clark Cup) and 3rd grade (Campbell Cup) teams winning their premierships.

Epping were promoted to 2nd Division in 2006, but returned to 3rd Division after the 2008 season.

Following a loss in the 2011 Radford Cup (3rd Division, Colts) grand final, Epping won the 2013 edition, finishing the year as undefeated premiers.

Epping secured the 2017 3rd Division Club Championship, with first and third grade teams (as minor premiers) and colts making finals. First grade would go on to win the Clark Cup for the third time.

After returning to Division 2 in 2018, Epping would have middling success. In 2020, the club's Blunt Cup (3rd grade) side would contest the grand final, winning it for the first time.

In 2022, the club was unable to field a colts (Under 21's) side and were not able to comply with the NSWSRU's requirements for Division 2. With the absence of Division 3, Epping were forced to compete in the Division 4 competition in 1st and 2nd Grade, while 3rd and 4th Grade were later invited to compete in the Division 2 Blunt and Richardson Cups. A tough season ensued, however, the club was strong enough to compete in the finals series in all four grades.

A partnership with Hunters Hill Rugby saw the re-establishment of a Colts side at Epping in 2023. This led to the club's inclusion in the NSWSRU Division 2 competition. In 2023, the club's 1s, Colts, 3s and 4s all competed in the finals series.

2023 also saw many milestones for the club, including Club Legend Scott Thurbon playing his 500th game for the Rams.

== Honours ==
=== Senior Rugby ===
==== Premierships ====
- Keith 'Doc' Harris Shield (3rd Division Club Champions) - 2005, 2017
- Clark Cup (3rd Division, 1st Grade) - 2001, 2005, 2017
- Grose Cup (4th Division, 2nd Grade) - 1992 (as Cavaliers), 1997
- Radford Cup (3rd Division, Colts) - 2013
- Blunt Cup (2nd Division, 3rd Grade) - 2020
- Campbell Cup (3rd Division, 3rd Grade) - 2004, 2005
- Walker Cup (4th Division, 3rd Grade) - 1986 (joint)

==== Individual honours ====
- Clark Medal (Player of the Year in 3rd Division):
  - Shaun Smith (2004)
  - Matt Barr (2005)
  - Toby Newton-McGee (2016, 2017)
- Colts Metal (Colts Player of the Year across all Colts competitions):
  - Joshua Bones (2017)
- Suburban Rugby Coach of the Year
  - Robert Kealy (2017)
- 100 First Grade Games
  - Michael Byrnes, Liam Duffy, Ash Emmett, Alasdair Forrest, Leigh Gallen, Brock Heydon, Paul Lambert, Chris Macleod, Simon Malone, Toby Newton-McGee, Scott Palmer, Mark Powell, Shaun Smith, Sam Trickett, Kent Walton

==== Suburban Rugby Representative Team Honours ====
Opens:

- Ray Taylor - 2003
- Gareth Smith - 2014

Under 19's:

- Tim McDonald - 2007
- Toby Newton-McGee - 2007
- David Sutton - 2007

Colts 7's

- Matthew Bartholomew - 2014
- Alasdair Forrest - 2014
  - Please note that club records only exist from 1997 onwards. Best attempts have been made to update. If you have further information that may be helpful, please contact the club through the website or Facebook page.

== Notable players ==
Epping players who have gone on to gain international or provincial caps include: Ian Williams, Mick Mathers, Brett Papworth, Matt Mostyn, Steve Tuynman (the Club Patron), Matt Burke and Lachlan Turner.

== See also ==
- Rugby union in Australia
- New South Wales Suburban Rugby Union
- Rugby union in New South Wales
