= Mark Harding =

Mark Harding may refer to:

- Mark Harding (bowls) (born 1971), Welsh international lawn and indoor bowler
- Mark Harding (rugby union) (born 1955), Australian rugby union player
