= Sofía Cairó =

Argentine field hockey player

Sofía Cairo
Personal information
- Born: 8 October 2002 (age 24) Buenos Aires, Argentina
- Height: 1.73 m (5 ft 8 in)
- Weight: 67 kg (148 lb)

Sport
- Sport: Field hockey
- Position: Midfielder
- Club: Mariano Moreno
Senior career
Years	Team	Caps	Goals
–present	Mariano Moreno	-	-
National team
Years	Team	Caps	Goals
2021–present	Argentina	76	(7)
Medal record
Olympic Games
Bronze medal – third place	2024 Paris	Team
World Cup
Gold medal – first place	2026 Wavre/Amstelveen
Silver medal – second place	2022 Terrassa/Amstelveen
Pan American Games
Gold medal – first place	2023 Santiago	Team
Pan American Cup
Gold medal – first place	2025 Montevideo
South American Games
Gold medal – first place	2026 Santa Fe
Junior World Cup
Silver medal – second place	2023 Santiago
Pan American Junior Championship
Silver medal – second place	2023 Bridgetown

Sofía Cairo (born 8 October 2002) is an Argentine field hockey player. She was named the FIH Player of the Year in 2026.

== Hockey career ==
In 2021, Cairo was called into the senior national women's team.

Preceded by Xan de Waard	FIH Player of the Year; 2026	Succeeded by Incumbent
