= 1997 Australia rugby union tour =

1997 Australia rugby union tour of Argentina and Great Britain
Summary
P	W	D	L
Total
7	5	1	1
Test match
4	2	1	1
Opponent
P	W	D	L
Argentina
2	1	0	1
England
1	0	1	0
Scotland
1	1	0	0

The 1997 Wallabies Spring Tour was a series of matches played in October and November 1997 in Argentina and Great Britain by the Australia national rugby union team.

== Matches ==
=== Summary ===
Complete list of matches played by the Wallabies:

Test matches

#	Date	Opponent	City	Venue	Score
1	25 Oct	Tucumán RU	Tucumán	Atlético Tucumán	16–15
2	29 Oct	Rosario RU	Rosario	Duendes	40–29
3	1 Nov	Argentina	Buenos Aires	Ferro Carril Oeste	23–15
4	5 Nov	Buenos Aires RU	Los Polvorines, GBA	Buenos Aires CRC	40–17
5	8 Nov	Argentina	Buenos Aires	Ferro Carril Oeste	16–18
6	15 Nov	England	London	Twickenham Stadium	15–15
7	22 Nov	Scotland	Edinburgh	Murrayfield Stadium	37–8

Balance
Pl	W	D	L	Ps	Pc
7	5	1	1	187	117

=== Match details ===
1 Nov 1997

Argentina	15–23	Australia
Pen: Giannantonio (5)		Try: Finnegan; Pen: Knox (6)

Ferro Carril Oeste
Referee: Bertie Smith (Ireland)

Argentina	Australia

Argentina: Ezequiel Jurado; Diego Albanese, Eduardo Simone, Fabián Turnes, Diego Giannantonio; Lisandro Arbizu, Agustín Pichot; Pablo Camerlinckx; Miguel Ruiz, Rolando Martín; Alejandro Allub, Pedro Sporleder (c); Mauricio Reggiardo, Mario Ledesma (Martín Scelzo), Roberto Grau.
Australia: Stephen Larkham (Mitch Hardy); Ben Tune, Tim Horan, Pat Howard, Joe Roff; David Knox, George Gregan; Troy Coker (Willie Ofahengaue); Brett Robinson, Owen Finnegan (Willie Ofahengaue); John Eales (c), Warwick Waugh; Andrew Blades, Michael Foley, Richard Harry.

8 Nov 1997

Argentina	18–16	Australia
Try: Pichot, Martin; Pen: Giannantonio (2); Drop: Giannantonio		Try: Finnegan, Tune; Pen: Knox (2)

Ferro Carril Oeste
Referee: Dave McHugh (Ireland)

Argentina	Australia

Argentina: Ezequiel Jurado; Diego Albanese, Eduardo Simone, Fabián Turnes, Diego Giannantonio; Lisandro Arbizu, Agustín Pichot; Pablo Camerlinckx; Miguel Ruiz, Rolando Martín; Alejandro Allub, Pedro Sporleder (c); Mauricio Reggiardo (Omar Hasan), Mario Ledesma, Roberto Grau
Australia: Stephen Larkham; Ben Tune, Tim Horan, Pat Howard, Joe Roff; David Knox (Mitch Hardy), George Gregan; Troy Coker (Willie Ofahengaue); Brett Robinson, Owen Finnegan; John Eales (c), Warwick Waugh; Andrew Blades, Michael Foley, Richard Harry

== Bibliography ==
- Cleary, Mick, ed. (1998). Rothmans Rugby Union Yearbook 1998–99. Headline. ISBN 0-7472-7653-6.
