= Steve Cutler =

Steve Cutler may refer to:

- Steve Cutler (rugby union), Australia rugby union player
- Steve Maclin, American professional wrestler who was wrestled in WWE with ring name Steve Cutler
