= Rod Crerar =

- Full name: Rodney Glen Crerar
- Born: 14 August 1958 (age 68) Sydney, Australia

Rugby union career
- Position: Hooker
International career
Years	Team	Apps	(Points)
1983	Australia		

Rodney Glen Crerar (born 14 August 1958) is an Australian former rugby union player.

A Warringah Roos product, Crerar grew up in Sydney's northern suburbs, attending Killarney Heights High School.

Crerar spent his entire first-grade career with Manly, after debuting from the colts in 1979. He featured in Manly's 1983 premiership team, coached by Alan Jones, which ended a 33-year title drought.

A hooker, Crerar won a Wallabies call up for the 1983 tour of Italy and France, despite having no prior state representative experience. He was flown in as an injury replacement for Mark McBain, who had suffered a fractured skull against France. Joining the squad in time for the final Test against France, Crerar spent the match on the bench as a reserve, before making an uncapped appearance against the French Barbarians.
