= Serafín Dengra (athlete) =

Argentine middle-distance runner

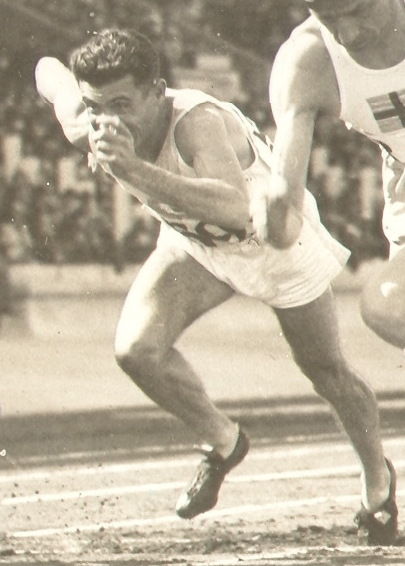
- Serafín Dengra in 1928

Personal information
- Nationality: Argentine
- Born: 25 December 1902 Huéscar, Granada, Spain
- Died: 1966 (aged 63–64)

Sport
- Sport: Middle-distance running
- Event: 800 metres

Serafín Agustín Dengra Hernández (25 December 1902 – 1966) was an Argentine middle-distance runner. He competed in the men's 800 metres at the 1928 Summer Olympics.

He met his wife of Belgian origin, Lilly Robert, at the 1928 Olympics. His grandson of the same name became a famous rugby union footballer.

Between 1932 and 1936, Dengra also was coach of Ferro Carril Oeste.
