= Brad Burke =

Australian rugby union international

- Full name: Bradford Thomas Burke
- Born: 6 August 1963 (age 63) Sydney, Australia
- School: Waverley College
- Notable relative(s): Matt Burke (brother); Peter Burke (father)

Rugby union career
- Position: Scrum-half
International career
Years	Team	Apps	(Points)
1988	Australia	1	(0)
- Rugby league career

Playing information
- Position: Halfback
Club
Years	Team	Pld	T	G	FG	P
1990	Eastern Suburbs	7				0

Bradford Thomas Burke (born 6 August 1963) is an Australian former rugby union international who represented Australia in one Test match. He also played rugby league for Eastern Suburbs.

Burke, son of Manly Warringah halfback Peter, was born in Sydney and attended Waverley College. His younger brother Matt was a Wallabies winger, who also converted to rugby league.

A scrum-half, Burke played for Randwick and gained his only Wallabies cap on the 1988 tour of Europe. He came on as a substitute in the closing stages of the Test against Scotland at Murrayfield, replacing an injured Nick Farr-Jones.

Burke, switching to rugby league, made seven first-grade appearances for the Eastern Suburbs Roosters in the 1990 NSWRL season, as a teammate of brother Matt. He played as a halfback.

== See also ==
- List of Australia national rugby union players
