= Steve Lidbury =

Australian rugby union international

- Full name: Stephen Michael John Lidbury
- Born: 22 May 1960 (age 66) Sydney, NSW, Australia

Rugby union career
- Position: Flanker / No. 8
International career
Years	Team	Apps	(Points)
1987–88	Australia	2	(0)

Stephen Michael John Lidbury (born 22 May 1960) is an Australian former rugby union international.

Born in Sydney, Lidbury attended Pittwater High School.

Lidbury, a powerful back-row forward, played in the Shute Shield for Warringah. He was capped twice by the Wallabies, as a number eight on the 1987 tour of Argentina, then as a flanker in a home Test against England in 1988.

In October 1988, Lidbury was signed by rugby league club the Canberra Raiders on a two-year contract, but injury would prevent him an opportunity to play first-grade. He suffered a near fatal broken neck in a 1989 reserves game against Penrith while packing a scrum, ending his sporting career.

== See also ==
- List of Australia national rugby union players
