= Peter Burke (rugby league) =

Australia international rugby league player

Personal information
- Full name: Thomas Peter Burke
- Born: 2 November 1933 (age 92)
- Died: 28th November 2025

Playing information
- Position: Halfback
Club
Years	Team	Pld	T	G	FG	P
1955–63	Manly Warringah	105	21	0	0	63
Representative
Years	Team	Pld	T	G	FG	P
1959–60	New South Wales	4	0	0	0	0
1960	Australia	1	2	0	0	6
- Relatives: Brad Burke (son); Matt Burke (son)

Thomas Peter Burke (born 26 November 1933) is an Australian former rugby league player.

A local junior from Manly Christian Brothers, Burke won a reserves premiership with Manly in 1954, before becoming first-grade halfback the following season. He featured in Manly's 1957 and 1959 grand final losses, both to St. George. At the end of the 1959 season, Burke toured Europe with the Kangaroos and scored two tries in his only international, against Italy at Treviso.

Burke had four sons who played rugby union with Randwick. One of his sons is 1980s Wallabies winger Matt Burke, who later followed his father in playing for Manly. Another son, Brad, was also capped for the Wallabies and played rugby league with Eastern Suburbs.
