= Pedro Lanza =

Argentine rugby union player (born 1961)

- Born: September 21, 1961 (age 65) Buenos Aires, Argentina
- Notable relative: Juan Lanza (brother)

Rugby union career
- Position: Wing
Senior career
Years	Team	Apps	(Points)
197?-198?	CUBA		
International career
Years	Team	Apps	(Points)
1983-1987	Argentina	16	(24)

Pedro Lanza (born 21 September 1961 in Buenos Aires) is a former Argentine rugby union footballer and manager. He played as a winger.

== Career ==
Playing during his entire career for Club Universitario de Buenos Aires, he debuted for Argentina in 1983, during the 1983 South American Rugby Championship held in Argentina, Buenos Aires, becoming continental champion. Two years later, he was champion again during the 1985 South American Rugby Championship held in Asunción, Paraguay; he was in the roster which took part at the 1987 Rugby World Cup in Australia and New Zealand, constituting, along with his brother Juan, the first Argentine couple of twins in the Rugby World Cup.

After retiring as player, Pedro Lanza, like his brother, started his coaching career and currently he is coach of CUBA which until 2008, he coached the first team alongside Juan.
