= Julian Gardner (rugby union) =

Italy international rugby union player

Julian Michael Gardner (born 12 May 1964, in Brisbane) is an Australian-Italian former international rugby union player and a current coach. He played as a flanker.

Gardner first played at Wests Rugby. He then made his debut for Australia with 4 caps in 1987 and 1988.

He moved to Italy to play for Rugby Rovigo in 1991/92. He also adopted Italian citizenship in virtue of an Italian grandmother. He was a Rugby Rovigo player until 1993/94, moving then to Rugby Roma Olimpic where he played in 1994/95. Gardner played for Benetton Treviso from 1995/96 to 1997/98, where he won the Italian Championship title in 1996/97.

Shortly before adopting Italian citizenship he was selected to play for Italy, earning 20 caps from 1992 to 1998, and scoring 4 tries, 20 points on aggregate. He was selected for the 1995 Rugby World Cup, playing in three games but without scoring. He was member of the team that beat France by 40–32 at the final of the 1995-1997 FIRA Trophy, scoring the second try at the 34th minute.

After finishing his player career, Gardner returned to Australia, where he was the coach of Australia Sevens national team, from 2000 to 2002, and Queensland Reds Academy.
