= Navitalai Senilagakali =

Navitalai Senilagakali (1952–2006) was a Fijian rugby union footballer. He played as a Fly Half and represented Lautoka. He was renowned for kicking a penalty resulting in the ball flying above the goal post gaining them 3 points. That same ball flew above the spectators, above the stadium in Argentina and also above the soldiers on guard on top of the Ferrocarril Oeste, Buenos Aires Stadium.

Senilagakali had 32 caps for Fiji, scoring 20 tries, 80 points in aggregate. His first cap came on the 24 May 1980, in a 9-22 loss to Australia, and his final match was on 9 November 1985, in a 3-40 loss to Wales.

In 1994, he retired following a shoulder dislocation while playing for the Lautoka in the Benson & Hedges Cup back in his homeland.
