= Club Atlético Banco de la Nación Argentina =

Argentine sports club

(Argentina) Banco Nación
- Full name: Club Atlético Banco de la Nación Argentina
- Union: URBA
- Founded: 12 October 1909; 117 years ago
- Location: Vicente López, Argentina
- Ground: Vicente López
- President: Rodrigo Graña
- League: URBA Primera B
- 2026: 1st. (champion and promoted)
Team kit

Official website
- clubbanconacion.org.ar

Club Atlético Banco de la Nación Argentina (mostly known as Club Banco Nación) is an Argentine amateur sports club, located in the neighborhood of Vicente López in the homonymous partido of Greater Buenos Aires. The club is mostly known for its rugby union team, which currently plays in Primera División A, the second division of the Unión de Rugby de Buenos Aires league system.

Apart from rugby, the club hosts other activities such as aikido, artistic roller skating, basketball, field hockey, football, judo, pilates, swimming, tennis, volleyball and yoga. Banco Nación also has a section of Saint Edward's College.

== History ==
Banco Nación was founded on October 12, 1909, as sports club by employees of Banco de la Nación Argentina, Argentina's state-owned bank. Originally located near the Colegiales railway station, the club moved to its current location on Zufriategui street in 1928.

Kit worn v England in 1990

Banco Nación's rugby team won the URBA Tournament in 1986 and 1989, as well as several rugby sevens tournaments. Hugo Porta, long-time captain of the national team, played in Banco Nación during his entire career; other recognized Pumas, such as Fabián Turnes, Pablo Dinisio, Fabio Gómez, and Adolfo Cappeletti began their careers with the team.

As 1986 Argentine champion, the club participated in the 1987 "Campeonato Sudamericano", a club competition in South America held from 1985 to 2000. Banco Nación was the winner of the tournament, achieving their first and only title.

On July 14, 1990, Banco Nación defeated England national team in a surprising 29 to 21 victory, being the only club level team to do that in the world. Banco Nación's starting line up was: Ingani, Cando, Marrón; Etchegoyen, Gallo; Franchi, Dinisio, Rubio; Gómez, Porta (c); Gentile, Pérez, Zanero, Benedetto, Soto. The team was coached by Pepe Gavito and Indio Fernández. With that overwhelming victory, Banco Nación became the first club in the world to defeat England. Nevertheless, it was not the first Banco's win over a national side so one year before, the club had defeated Canada 21–9 in 1989.

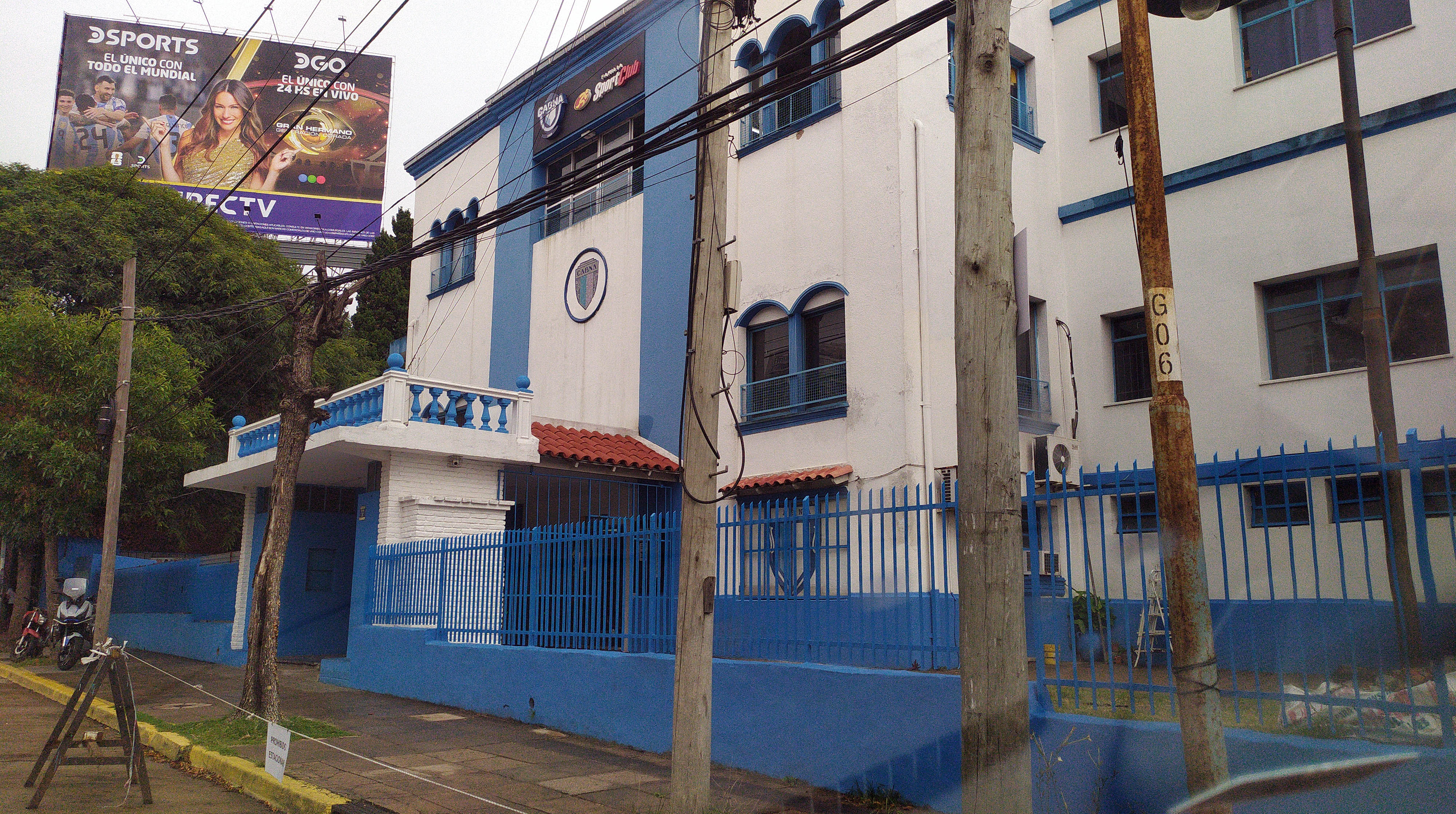
Banco Nación's clubhouse in Vicente López as seen in 2026

In 2010 Banco was relegated to the second division, along with Club Pueyrredón. In November, 2011, Banco Nación defeated Hurling Club 31-28 proclaiming second division champion.

In September 2014, Banco Nación returned to the first division (Grupo I) after defeating Universitario (La Plata) by 41-19.

In December 2018, Hugo Porta, the most notable rugby player in Banco Nación's history, was elected president of the institution.

Banco Nación won the 2026 Primera B (third division) championship, promoting to the upper division.

== Nootable athletes ==
- Agostina Alonso – field hockey, also part of the Argentina national team, that won silver medal at the 2020 Summer Olympics.
- Hugo Porta – rugby (1970–90), widely regarded as the best Argentine player ever.
- Fabián Turnes – rugby (1983–89, 1997–98)

== Honours ==
=== Rugby union ===
- URBA Top 12 (2): 1986, 1989
- URBA Segunda División (1): 2011
- URBA Primera B (1): 2026
- Sudamericano de Clubes (1): 1987

=== Field hockey ===
Women's

- Metropolitano de Primera División (4): 1968, 1970, 1973, 2018
