= Roberto Cobelo =

Argentine rugby union player (born 1962)

- Born: October 31, 1962 (age 64) Argentina

Rugby union career
- Position: Lock
Senior career
Years	Team	Apps	(Points)
198?-1987	CASI		
International career
Years	Team	Apps	(Points)
1987	Argentina	3	(0)

Roberto Cobelo (born 31 October 1962) is a former Argentine rugby union player. He played as a lock.

== Career ==
Cobelo spent all of his club career at Club Atlético San Isidro. He was first capped for Argentina in a match against Uruguay, in Santiago, on 27 September 1987. He was called up in the Argentina 1987 Rugby World Cup squad, but did not play any match in the tournament. His last cap for Argentina was against Chile, in Santiago, on 3 October 1987.
