= Greg Martin (rugby union) =

- Born: Greg J Martin; 30 June 1963 (age 63) Brisbane, Queensland, Australia

Rugby union career
- Position: Fullback
Senior career
| Years | Team | Apps | (Points) |
| 1981–1999 | University | | |
Provincial / State sides
| Years | Team | Apps | (Points) |
| | Queensland | 65 | |
International career
| Years | Team | Apps | (Points) |
| 1989–90 | Australia | 9 | (12) |

Greg J Martin (born 30 June 1963) is an Australian rugby union player. He played as a fullback. He earned nine Wallaby caps in 1989 and 1990, and 65 caps for the Queensland Reds. He played club rugby for the Brisbane club University for 18 years.

Since retiring from playing he has worked as part of Fox Sports Rugby Union match commentary team in Australia. Martin is born on the same day as fellow former wallaby, Mark Bartholomeusz. He is widely known for his controversial comments, including challenging the need for the All Blacks Haka. In 2009 he also stood for election in the state election in the seat of South Brisbane, where he received 1.3% of the vote. He is also a co-host on Triple M Brisbane's Big Breakfast with Margaux Parker.
