= Mariano Bosch =

Argentine rugby union player (born 1962)

- Born: Mariano Ángel Bosch; August 9, 1962 (age 64) Buenos Aires

Rugby union career
- Position: Hooker
Senior career
Years	Team	Apps	(Points)
198?-199?	Olivos Rugby Club		
International career
Years	Team	Apps	(Points)
1991-1992	Argentina	4	(0)

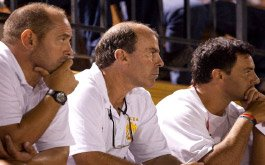
Mariano Bosch, rugbier

Mariano Ángel Bosch (born Buenos Aires, 9 August 1962) is a former Argentine rugby union player and a current coach. He played as a hooker.

Bosch played for Olivos Rugby Club in the Nacional de Clubes.

He had 4 caps for Argentina, from 1991 to 1992, without scoring. He was called for the 1991 Rugby World Cup, playing in two games, one of them as a substitute.

Bosch, after ending his player career, became a coach. He was already the coach of Olivos.
