= Sanivalati Laulau =

Fijian rugby union footballer (1952–2013)

- Born: 1952 Nawaka, Nadi
- Died: 13 January 2013 (age 61)
- Height: 1.78 m (5 ft 10 in)
- Weight: 83 kg (13 st 1 lb; 183 lb)

Rugby union career
- Position: Wing
International career
Years	Team	Apps	(Points)
1980-1985	Fiji	32	(80)

Sanivalati Laulau (Nawaka, 1952 – 13 January 2013) was a Fijian rugby union footballer. He played on the wing. He represented Nawaka.

Laulau had 32 caps for Fiji, scoring 20 tries, 80 points in aggregate. He is the current record holder for his country in the number of tries. His first cap came at the 24 May 1980, in 9–22 loss to Australia, and his final match was at 9 November 1985, in a 3–40 loss to Wales.

He left his country side previously to the 1987 Rugby World Cup finals. He was also a rugby union coach.

On 13 January 2013 Laulau died at his sister's home after a brief illness.
