= Paul Carozza =

Australian rugby union player

Paul Carozza (born 14 April 1966, Brisbane, Queensland)is a retired former international rugby player for Australia.

== Early life ==
Carozza was born in Brisbane, Queensland, Australia where he attended Brisbane State High School.

== Career ==
Carozza career lasted from 1990 to 1993 in which he played in the position of winger. He was injured for the 1991 World Cup but returned in time for the one-off test against South Africa in 1992, scoring twice in the 26–3 win. He also toured Europe in the same year. All Black prop Richard Loe smashed his forearm into Carozza's nose, breaking it, after he had scored against New Zealand in Brisbane, Australia in the 19–17 win. He won 15 caps in his career before his final appearance on 17 July 1993 where Australia lost against New Zealand.

He is currently the head coach of the QAS Reds Rugby Academy. He was also a teacher of PE at Browns Plains state school in the year of 1992-1993
