= Juan Lanza =

Argentine rugby union player (born 1963)

- Born: June 7, 1963 (age 63) Buenos Aires, Argentina
- Notable relative: Pedro Lanza (brother)

Rugby union career
- Position: Wing
Senior career
Years	Team	Apps	(Points)
1978-198?	CUBA		
International career
Years	Team	Apps	(Points)
1985-1987	Argentina	13	(32)

Juan Lanza (born 7 June 1963 in Buenos Aires) is a former Argentine rugby union footballer and manager. He played as wing.

== Career ==
Playing during his entire career for Club Universitario de Buenos Aires, he debuted for Argentina in 1985, during the 1985 South American Rugby Championship held in Asunción, Paraguay, becoming continental champion. Two years later, he was champion again during the 1987 South American Rugby Championship held in Montevideo, Uruguay; he was in the roster which took part at the 1987 Rugby World Cup in Australia and New Zealand, playing in all the three pool stage matches against Fiji, Italy and the All Blacks, which coincided with his last international cap, on 1 June 1987. He constituted, along with his brother Pedro, the first Argentine couple of twins in the Rugby World Cup.

After retiring as player, Juan Lanza, like his brother, started his coaching career and currently he is coach of CUBA which until 2008, he coached the first team alongside Pedro
