= Ian Williams (rugby union) =

Australia & Japan international rugby union player

- Born: Ian Malcolm Williams; 23 September 1963 (age 63) Sydney, New South Wales, Australia
- School: Epping Boys High School and Cranbrook School
- University: Oxford University

Rugby union career
- Position: Wing
Youth career
- 19-1983: Epping
Amateur team(s)
Years	Team	Apps	(Points)
1983–1989	Eastwood		
Senior career
Years	Team	Apps	(Points)
1989	Oxford		
1990–1995	Kobe Steel		
1995-	Souths		
Provincial / State sides
Years	Team	Apps	(Points)
1983–1989	New South Wales		
International career
Years	Team	Apps	(Points)
1987–1990	Australia	17	(40)
1993	Japan	1	(5)

Ian Malcolm Williams (born 23 September 1963 in Canberra, Australian Capital Territory) is an Australian former rugby union player who played as wing. He played for both Australia and Japan. He is nicknamed Peabody.

== Early life ==
Ian Malcolm Williams was born on 23 September 1963, in Canberra. His father is a former lecturer in geology at the Australian National University and his mother is a former English teacher at Canberra High School. In 1966, Williams moved to the United States of America with his family, after his father spent a sabbatical year, first at Stanford University for seven months and then in Washington D.C. for four months, before returning to Canberra. Two years later, Stanford University offered Williams’ father a professorship, and in 1969 Williams returned to California to live.

== Career ==
Williams attended Epping Boys High School and Cranbrook School in Sydney. Before playing rugby, he played for Australia Under 19 baseball team and won the Combined Associated Schools 100 metres sprint crown with a time of 10.8 seconds. He played for the Australian Schoolboys rugby union team, and was the sprint champion of Combined Associated Schools. He then started his senior career in Eastwood. His debut against another country was in a match against Fiji, playing for Sydney in 1983. Sydney won the match 38 to 14, with a try scored by Williams. He debuted for the New South Wales representative team against an early-season tour of the All Blacks, where New South Wales suffered a loss of 10 to 37. Williams debuted for the Wallabies in the 1984 tour of the British Isles, where originally he was not part of the Australian squad, but was called up as replacement after Brendan Moon injured an arm during the match against England. Williams played only four matches in the tour, which was known as the Grand Slam Tour, with the Wallabies defeating England, Wales, Scotland and Ireland.

He made his test debut for Australia in the match against Argentina, at Buenos Aires, on 31 October 1987. He last cap for Australia was against New Zealand, in Christchurch, on 21 July 1990, during the 1990 Bledisloe Cup. Williams also played in The Varsity Match for Oxford University, which he also attended before finishing his studies. Later, he moved to Japan, where he played for Kobe Steel, where he was part of the squad of the club's golden age. With Kobe Steel, Williams won six Japan Company Rugby Football Championships and six All-Japan Rugby Football Championships. In 1993, Williams was called up to the Japan team by coach Osamu Koyabu. His only cap for Japan was against Wales, in Cardiff, on 16 October 1993, where after Japan's defeat against Wales for 55–5, he would not be called up again for the national team.
