= Mark Harding (rugby union) =

Australian rugby union international

- Full name: Mark Anthony Harding
- Born: 28 December 1955 Christchurch, New Zealand
- Died: 26 September 2024 (aged 68)
- Height: 6 ft 1 in (185 cm)

Rugby union career
- Position: Prop
International career
Years	Team	Apps	(Points)
1983	Australia	1	(0)

Mark Anthony Harding (28 December 1955 – 26 September 2024) was an Australian rugby union international.

Harding was born and raised in Christchurch, New Zealand. He attended Christchurch Boys' High School, captaining the school's 1st XV in 1973. Before relocating to Australia in 1980, he was a New Zealand rugby representative at underage level, as well as a member of the New Zealand national water polo team.

A prop, Harding played for Sydney clubs St. George and Port Hacking. He earned a Wallabies call up for the 1983 tour of Europe and was capped in a Test against Italy at Rovigo, as part of an inexperienced front row.

== See also ==
- List of Australia national rugby union players
