= Ezequiel Jurado =

Argentine rugby union player

Ezequiel Jurado (born Rosario, 17 April 1973) is a former Argentine rugby union player. He played as a fullback.

Jurado played for Jockey Club de Rosario.

He had 28 caps for Argentina, scoring 6 tries, 30 points on aggregate, from the 53-7 loss to Australia, at 30 April 1995, in Brisbane, in a friendly game, to the 26-36 loss to Wales, at 5 June 1999, in Buenos Aires, in another friendly game. He was called for the 1995 Rugby World Cup, playing in three games but remaining scoreless. He had been pre-selected for the 1999 Rugby World Cup, but was left outside the final team.
