= Cameron Lillicrap =

Australian rugby union player

Cameron Paul Lillicrap (born 19 April 1963) is a former international rugby union player.

Lillicrap was born in Brisbane. He played prop and was capped seven times for Australia between 1985 and 1991. He was part of the 1984 Wallabies Grand Slam Tour squad and played for Australia at two Rugby World Cups – the inaugural tournament in 1987 and as part of the victorious Wallabies squad in 1991. In 1999 he was named in the Queensland Team of the Century. He represented Queensland from 1984 to 1994.

He retired from playing in 1994 and started his career as a professional physiotherapist in 1996.

In his two decades in the industry, Lillicrap has worked as both the Queensland (1996–2001, 2007–2008) and Wallabies (1997–2006) physiotherapist, before shifting his focus to private practice in 2007.
