= Mark Hartill =

Australian former Rugby Union prop (born 1964)

Mark Hartill (born 29 May 1964) is an Australian former representative Rugby Union prop. He was a member of the Australian squad at the 1987 and 1995 Rugby World Cup. He made 20 national representative appearances between 1986 and 1995. Hartill was raised in Sydney and his senior schooling was at Crows Nest Boys High School.
