= Pablo Garretón =

Argentine rugby union player (born 1966)

- Born: Pablo Arturo Garretón; July 26, 1966 (age 60) San Miguel de Tucumán
- Occupation: Neurosurgeon

Rugby union career
- Position: Flanker
Senior career
Years	Team	Apps	(Points)
1973-1976	Tucumán Lawn Tennis		
1988-2004	Universitario (T)		
Provincial / State sides
Years	Team	Apps	(Points)
1989	Tucumán		
International career
Years	Team	Apps	(Points)
1991-1995	Argentina	30	(50)

Pablo Arturo Garretón (born 26 June 1966 in San Miguel de Tucumán) is a former Argentine rugby union player. He played as a flanker.

His father was a rugby fan and took him to Tucumán Lawn Tennis when he was only 7 years old, in 1973. A domestic accident made him quit but he would come back to Universitario Rugby Club de Tucumán in 1976, where he spent most of his career. He had his debut for the first team in 1983/84, aged 17 years old, and he stayed there until 1991/92. He moved to Buenos Aires in 1992 to work in the Italian Hospital. For that reason he moved to Belgrano Athletic and later played for Hindú Club. He won the URBA tournament in 1997/98.

He had 31 caps for Argentina, from 1987 to 1993, scoring 2 tries, 8 points on aggregate. He was called for the 1991 Rugby World Cup, where he was the captain and played in three games, without scoring. He was the first captain of the "Pumas" from outside Buenos Aires.

He was also President of the Universitario Rugby Club de Tucumán.
