= Damien Frawley =

Australia international rugby union player

- Born: Damien John Frawley; 31 July 1962 (age 64) Rockhampton, Queensland, Australia
- School: St Joseph's College, Gregory Terrace

Rugby union career
- Position: Loose forward
Amateur team(s)
Years	Team	Apps	(Points)
- Brothers Rugby Club
Provincial / State sides
Years	Team	Apps	(Points)
- Queensland
International career
Years	Team	Apps	(Points)
1979	Aus Schools	4	(0)
1986–88	Australia	10	(0)
Coaching career
- Years: Team
- 2009: Northern Suburbs Rugby Club

Damien John Frawley (born 31 July 1962) is a former international rugby union player.

Frawley was born in Rockhampton, Queensland. He attended St Joseph's College, Gregory Terrace, and played four matches for the Australian Schoolboys before representing the Queensland Reds. He played ten times for the Australia national rugby union team (player #655) between 1986 and 1988. After he retired from the game he moved to Sydney, where he coached the Norths Pirates to two Premierships.
