= Pablo Buabse =

Argentine rugby union player (born 1963)

- Born: Pablo Marcelo Buabse; March 27, 1963 (age 63) San Miguel de Tucumán

Rugby union career
- Position(s): Lock, Flanker
Senior career
Years	Team	Apps	(Points)
198?-199?	Los Tarcos Rugby Club		
International career
Years	Team	Apps	(Points)
1989-1995	Argentina	7	(0)

Pablo Marcelo Buabse (born 27 March 1963 in San Miguel de Tucumán) is a former Argentine rugby union player. He played as a lock and as a flanker.

Buabse played for local team of Los Tarcos Rugby Club.

He had 7 caps for Argentina, from 1989 to 1995, without scoring. He was called for the 1991 Rugby World Cup, playing a game, and for the 1995 Rugby World Cup, but this time never leaving the bench.
