= Jorge Allen =

Argentine rugby union player (born 1956)

- Born: July 12, 1956 (age 70) Vicente López, Argentina

Rugby union career
- Position: Flanker
Senior career
Years	Team	Apps	(Points)
198?-1982	CASI		
1982-1983	Sharks		
1983-1984	L'Aquila		
1984-1989	CASI		
International career
Years	Team	Apps	(Points)
1981-1989	Argentina	26	(4)
–	South American Jaguars	3	(0)

Jorge G. Allen (born 12 July 1956) is a former Argentine rugby union player. He played as a flanker.

== Career ==
Starting with CASI, Allen was the first player of his country to play in a South African team: in 1982, he was contracted by the Natal Sharks for two seasons. At the time, Allen had debuted for Argentina, against Canada, at Buenos Aires in 1981, although his absolute debut was in 1980 with the South American Jaguars representative team, who played in that year four matches against the Springboks. He was also part of the squad which won the 1985 South American Rugby Championship (only test match, against Uruguay); two years later, he was called up for the Pumas at the 1987 Rugby World Cup in Australia and New Zealand, during which he played all the three pool stage matches (Fiji, Italy and New Zealand). Allen also won the South American Rugby Championship in 1987 and 1989; in the latter year, he also played his last international match, against USA.

After the South African experience, Allen played also in Italy, for L'Aquila Rugby before returning to Argentina, to San Isidro and end there his career.
