= Club y Biblioteca Mariano Moreno =

Argentine sports club

(Argentina) Mariano Moreno
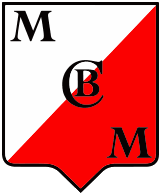
- Full name: Club y Biblioteca Mariano Moreno
- Union: URBA
- Nickname: Biblioteca
- Founded: 30 August 1915; 110 years ago
- Ground: Moreno, Buenos Aires
- Chairman: Miguel Angel Kuriger
- League: Primera B
- 2025: 7th.
Team kit

Official website
- clubmarianomoreno.com

Club y Biblioteca Mariano Moreno is an Argentine amateur sports club sited in the Moreno district of the homonymous partido in Greater Buenos Aires. Although other sports are practised at the club, Mariano Moreno is mostly known for its rugby union team, which currently plays in Primera División B, the third division of the Unión de Rugby de Buenos Aires league system.

Apart from rugby, other sports practised at the club are field hockey, gymnastics, and tennis.

== History ==
Mariano Moreno was founded on August 30, 1915.

The club's name was chosen as a tribute to lawyer and journalist Mariano Moreno, who played a decisive role in the Primera Junta, the first Government of Argentina.

Mariano Moreno has a strong rivalry with Los Matreros, the other team from the Zona Oeste of the Greater Buenos Aires. The club's best campaign was in 2010 when Mariano Moreno promoted to the Grupo I (the first division of the Torneo de la URBA), after defeating Club San Andrés de Benavídez. T

The team lasted there only one season so in 2011 Mariano Moreno was relegated to second division after finishing 15 in Zona Reubicación. In 2012 the club won the Grupo II championship.
