= Steve James (rugby) =

- Born: Stephen Leslie Keith James; 23 July 1960 (age 66) Darlinghurst, New South Wales

Rugby union career
- Position: Fly-half
Provincial / State sides
Years	Team	Apps	(Points)
1983-1989	New South Wales		
International career
Years	Team	Apps	(Points)
1987-1989	Australia	41	(16)
- Rugby league career

Coaching information
Club
Years	Team	Gms	W	D	L	W%
2004–2006	Carlingford
	Balmain
	Total	0	0	0	0

Stephen Leslie Keith James (born 23 July 1960 in Darlinghurst, New South Wales) is a former Australian rugby union player and currently, rugby league coach. He played as a fly-half.

== Career ==
Between 1983 and 1989, James was part of the New South Wales representative team, for which he played 10 times. James debuted for the Wallabies immediately before the 1987 Rugby World Cup against Korea, and then, during the tournament, he disputed only the match against England in the pool stage; later, he disputed the Bledisloe Cup in 1987 and in 1988, his last cap. After his retirement, James moved to a coaching career: from 2004 to 2006, he coached Carlingford Cougars, a rugby league team from Balmain in New South Wales, and was part of Balmain Tigers' coaching staff.
