= Brett Papworth =

Australian rugby union and rugby league footballer

- Born: 5 November 1963 (age 63) Mater Hospital Waratah, Newcastle, NSW

Rugby union career
- Position: Centre
Amateur team(s)
| Years | Team | Apps | (Points) |
| – | Epping Rugby | | |
| – | Eastwood | | |
International career
| Years | Team | Apps | (Points) |
| 1985-87 | Australia | 16 | (20) |
- Rugby league career

Playing information
- Position: Centre
Club
| Years | Team | Pld | T | G | FG | P |
|---|---|---|---|---|---|---|
| 1988–91 | Sydney Roosters | 7 | 0 | 6 | 0 | 12 |

Brett Papworth (born 5 November 1963 in Sydney, New South Wales, Australia) played first grade rugby league for the Eastern Suburbs Roosters in the New South Wales Rugby League competition. He had formerly been an Australian rugby union international. His position of choice was usually at centre.

== Career ==
Papworth was raised in the Sydney suburb of North Epping and attended Epping Boys High School. Introduced to rugby during his primary education with the local Epping Rugby club, he played first-grade rugby union with Eastwood in the New South Wales competition coached by former Wallaby John Ballesty. From there, Papworth proceeded to make a total of fifteen test appearances for the Australian Wallabies side between 1985 and 1987, prior to switching to rugby league the following year.

Papworth elected to sign for the Eastern Suburbs side at the commencement of the 1988 NSWRL season but his progress was hampered by a series of injuries. Over the next four years in rugby league, Papworth's considerable talents were rarely on show; successive problems with his shoulders and knees, as well as a broken jaw, limited his game time to just seven appearances out of a total of 88 matches. At the conclusion of the 1991 season, Papworth announced his decision to retire at the age of 27.

Papworth next had a career in sports commentary. For 20 years, he commentated on the Shute Shield on ABC Television and occasionally on Super Rugby broadcasts on Fox Sports. Papworth also co-hosted a talk back radio sports show "Talkin' Sport" on Australian Radio station 2SM alongside Graeme Hughes, Peter Tunks and Gavin Robertson.
