= Michael Cook (rugby) =

Australia rugby player (born 1962)

- Born: Michael Terrance Cook; 23 April 1962 (age 64) Caulfield, Australia
- School: St. Joseph's College

Rugby union career
- Position: Number 8
Amateur team(s)
Years	Team	Apps	(Points)
1978-1980	St. Joseph's College		
Senior career
Years	Team	Apps	(Points)
1980-1989	Queensland		
International career
Years	Team	Apps	(Points)
1986-1988	Australia	11	(4)
- Rugby league career

Playing information
- Position: lock
Club
Years	Team	Pld	T	G	FG	P
1989–91	Sydney Roosters	16				8

Michael Terrance Cook (born 23 April 1962) is a former Australian professional rugby union international, who also spent time playing professional rugby league.

== Biography ==
Born in Caulfield, Cook grew up in Brisbane, where his family moved when he was around pre-school age; Cook went to school at St Joseph's College, Gregory Terrace where he played inside centre in his age group teams. Cook played 88 matches for the school, including 24 for the First XV alongside future Australian players Michael Lynagh and Damian Frawley during Terrace's five-year premiership run between 1977 and 1981. In 1979, Cook was selected in the Australian Schools team and played 2 schoolboys Tests against England Schools at Chatswood Oval in Sydney on 1 September 1979 and at Ballymore in Brisbane on 9 September 1979. In 1980, Cook played for the Queensland representative team, which, since 1984, at 22 years, he represented also at international level: he played some matches for the state team, like the matches against the national teams of Fiji and Canada.

In 1986, Cook debuted for the Wallabies in a test match against France, at Sydney: it was the first of 11 test matches until 1988, including the only match, played in the 1987 Rugby World Cup, won against Japan 42-23 in the first group, during which Cook broke an arm, thus being unavailable for the rest of the competition.

In 1989, Cook became a professional player and moved to rugby league, for Sydney Roosters; in three seasons of the Australian Rugby League, he collected 16 caps with two tries.

As of 2010, he works as a teacher in the Marist College Ashgrove.
