= Jeff Miller (rugby union) =

Australian rugby union player

- Full name: Jeffrey Scott Miller
- Born: 4 July 1962 (age 64) Prescott, Arizona, United States

Rugby union career
- Position: Flanker
Super Rugby
Years	Team	Apps	(Points)
- Queensland
International career
Years	Team	Apps	(Points)
1986–1991	Australia	26	(4)

Jeff Miller (born 4 July 1962) is a former Australian international rugby union player. He played as a flanker and was capped 26 times for Australia between 1986 and 1991. He was a member of the winning Australian squad at the 1991 Rugby World Cup and was also in the squad at the 1987 Rugby World Cup.
