= Serafín Dengra =

Argentine rugby union player (born 1961)

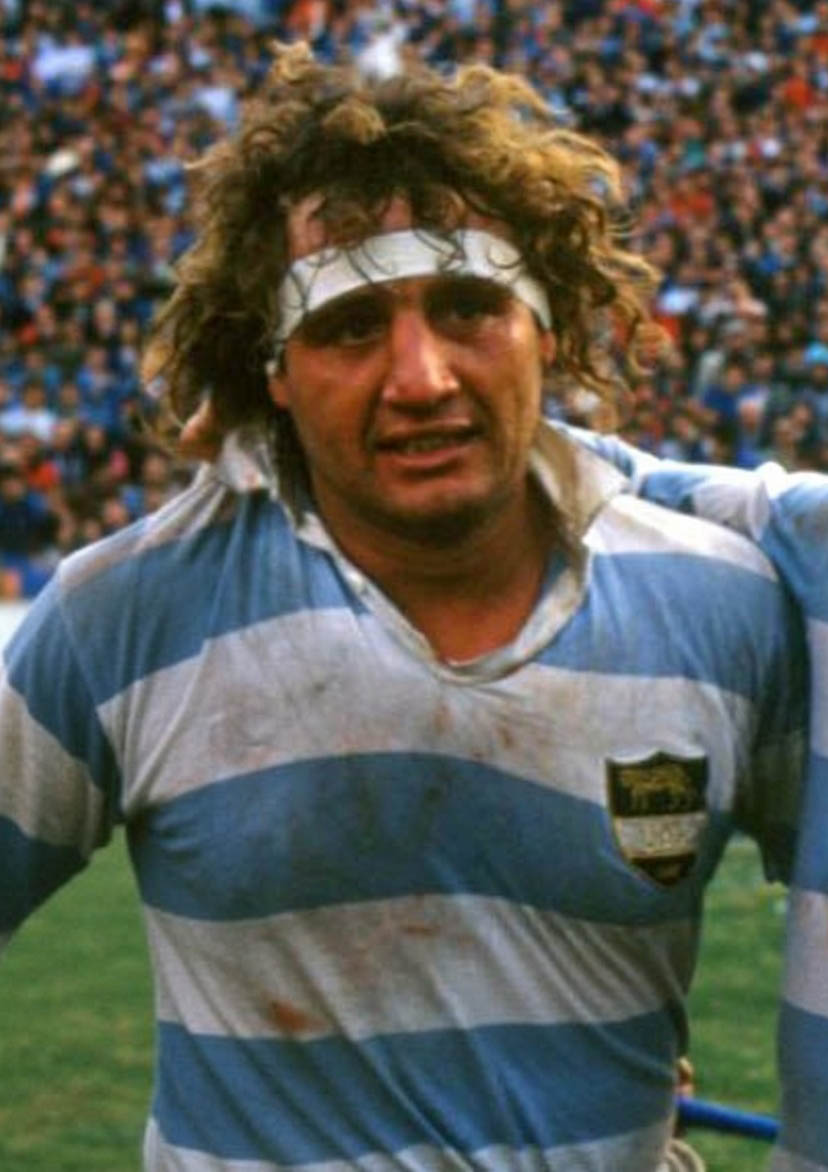
- Dengra with Argentina in 1988
- Born: 21 September 1961 (age 65) Ramos Mejia, Buenos Aires Province, Argentina
- Notable relative: Serafín Dengra (grandfather)

Rugby union career
- Position(s): Prop, Hooker
Senior career
Years	Team	Apps	(Points)
1978–1985	San Martín		
1985–1990	Wests		
1990–1992	Rovigo		
1992–1995	Bourgouin Jallieu		
Provincial / State sides
Years	Team	Apps	(Points)
1985	Queensland		
International career
Years	Team	Apps	(Points)
1982–1989	Argentina	18	(4)
1982–1984	Sudamérica XV	3	(0)

Serafín Dengra (born Ramos Mejia, 21 September 1961) is a former Argentine rugby union footballer and manager. He played as prop and hooker for Argentina, Queensland, and Wests Bulldogs. He is nicknamed Serafo.

== Career ==
Dengra comes from a family of sportspeople (which also boasts participation at 1928 Olympic Games). Dengra started to play rugby at 12 years when he was invited by some friends to see a match of women's field hockey of San Isidro Club, he noted on the adjacent field some rugby players in training; he then, entered in the San Martín youth team, in whose main team he later debuted in 1978.

When playing with his club, in 1982, Dengra debuted for the Argentina national team against France at Parc des Princes of Paris, as left prop, which was the position he played in all of his international career.

In 1985, Unión Argentina de Rugby suspended Dengra for six months due to him having moved to the Australian club Wests Bulldogs, which made him play for the Queensland representative team., due to a national regulamentation which sanctioned the players moving abroad, considered a form of masked professionalism in a sport which was still amateur.

Returning in the national team in 1986, Dengra took part at the 1987 Rugby World Cup, entering into the field in two matches, against Italy and New Zealand; he played his international last match in 1989, later, having accepted his move to Rugby Rovigo, being the first Argentinian player to play for Rovigo, the UAR suspended Dengra from the international activity for four years, which meant for Dengra to forsake definitively to the Pumas' jersey.

Dengra also played for Bourgouin Jallieu, where he retired from his playing career in 1995.

Currently he is the Sports Relations director of the gym chain Sport Club, he coaches an Over-35 team, the Pumas Classic and he occasionally dedicates himself to the practice of Rugby X-treme, a variant of rugby played on a snowy pitch at high altitude. In 2017, Dengra's motivational videos, where he used the catchphrases "Never pony, pura sangre" ("Never pony, thoroughbred") became viral in Argentina.
