= Diego Cuesta Silva =

Argentine rugby union player (born 1963)

- Born: 23 January 1963 (age 63) Buenos Aires, Argentina
- Height: 5 ft 9 in (1.75 m)
- Weight: 176 lb (80 kg)
- Occupation: Cardiologist

Rugby union career
- Position(s): Wing, Centre
Senior career
Years	Team	Apps	(Points)
1981-1984	La Salle		
1984-1998	San Isidro Club		
International career
Years	Team	Apps	(Points)
1983-1995	Argentina	65	(125)

Diego Cuesta Silva (born 23 January 1963, in Buenos Aires) is a former Argentine rugby union player. He played as a wing and as a centre. He works as a cardiologist.

Cuesta Silva first played at La Salle, where he had his debut at the Nacional de Clubes, in 1983. He moved to SIC, where he would play from 1985/86 to 1997/98, becoming one of the most popular players and winning two titles of the Nacional de Clubes, in 1993 and 1994.. He also played for Unión de Rugby de Buenos Aires, winning 6 times the Campeonato Argentino, in 1983, 1985, 1987, 1991, 1993 and 1995.

He had 65 caps for Argentina, from 1983 to 1995, scoring 28 tries, 125 points on aggregate.

Cuesta Silva was called for the 1987 Rugby World Cup, playing in two games, the 1991 Rugby World Cup, playing in three games, and the 1995 Rugby World Cup, where he performed in all the three games of the "Pumas". He never scored in any of his three presences at the competition.

He had two caps for South American Jaguars in 1984.
