= Matt Burke (rugby, born 1964) =

Australia international rugby union & league footballer

Personal information
- Full name: Matthew Peter Burke
- Born: 15 September 1964 (age 62) St Margaret's Hospital, New South Wales, Australia

Playing information

Rugby union
- Position: Wing
Club
| Years | Team | Pld | T | G | FG | P |
|---|---|---|---|---|---|---|
| | Randwick |
Representative
| Years | Team | Pld | T | G | FG | P |
| 1984–87 | Australia | 23 | | | | 60 |

Rugby league
- Position: Centre
Club
| Years | Team | Pld | T | G | FG | P |
|---|---|---|---|---|---|---|
| 1988–89 | Manly Sea Eagles | 28 | 7 | 0 | 0 | 28 |
| 1990–91 | Eastern Suburbs | 22 | 3 | 0 | 0 | 12 |
| 1992 | Balmain Tigers | 2 | 1 | 0 | 0 | 4 |
| | Total | 52 | 11 | 0 | 0 | 44 |
- Father: Peter Burke
- Relatives: Brad Burke (brother)

Matthew Peter Burke (born 15 September 1964) is an Australian former rugby union and rugby league footballer. He later served as a Waverley Council lifeguard on Bondi Beach.

== Early life ==
Born in St Margaret's Hospital in the Sydney suburb of Surry Hills. Burke attended Waverley College in Sydney's eastern suburbs, graduating in 1981.

== Rugby career ==
Burke made his debut for the Australian national rugby union team on 3 November 1984. He played 23 tests for the Wallabies on the wing and scored 15 tries, including five in the 1987 Rugby World Cup. Between 1988 and 1992, he played rugby league for the Manly-Warringah Sea Eagles, Eastern Suburbs Roosters and Balmain Tigers in the New South Wales Rugby League premiership. After a promising start, Burke's professional career stalled and he was relegated to lower grade football with Easts and Balmain.

== Post-rugby career ==
For some time after retirement, Burke ran the Mill Hill pub in Bondi Junction. He later spent two seasons as a Waverley Council lifeguard on Bondi Beach, appearing on the factual television programme Bondi Rescue. As of November 2009, he was a proprietor of the Primavera Espresso Bar in the Sydney CBD.

== Personal life ==
Burke's father, Peter, was a rugby league international and played for Manly-Warringah. Burke has three brothers, Brad, Daniel and Patrick.
