= Tom Lawton =

Tom Lawton, Jnr
- Born: Thomas Anthony Lawton; 27 November 1962 (age 63) Darwin, Northern Territory
- Height: 5 ft 11 in (1.80 m)
- Weight: 261 lb (118 kg; 18.6 st)
- Notable relative: Tom Lawton, Snr (grandfather)

Rugby union career
- Position: Hooker
Senior career
Years	Team	Apps	(Points)
1980-93	Souths Rugby		
Provincial / State sides
Years	Team	Apps	(Points)
1984-1992	Queensland		
1989-90	Natal		
International career
Years	Team	Apps	(Points)
1983-1992	Australia	41	(16)

Thomas Anthony Lawton (born Darwin, 1 November 1962) is a former Australian rugby union player. He played as a hooker.

== Career ==
Lawton comes from a known rugby union family: his grandfather, Tom Lawton, Snr was an important medic and, during his youth, he was a captain for the Wallabies in the 1920s. At club level, Lawton played for the Souths, from Brisbane, where he played for his entire career winning four Queensland State Championships, representing its state from 1984, and until 1992, Lawton played for Queensland 42 times. Lawton debuted for Australia in 1983, during a test match played at Clermont-Ferrand against France, and then, he took part at the victorious 1984 tour where Australia won the Grand Slam against England. In 1987, Lawton was called up among the selected players for the Australia national team at the 1987 Rugby World Cup, where the Wallabies finished fourth. In 1989, Lawton ends his international test experience during the tour of the British and Irish Lions to Australia, and in the following season, Lawton moved to South Africa, to play for Natal, with which he won the Currie Cup. He last represented the Wallabies during the 1992 tour to South Africa. After his retiring, Lawton returned in Australia, where currently he works in the retirement funds management branch; he also coached Souths, with which he won two Queensland championships in 1994 and 2000.
