= Rafael Madero =

Argentine rugby player

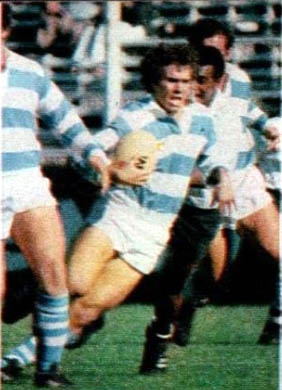
- Madero with Argentina in 1980
- Born: Rafael M. Madero; 16 July 1958 (age 68) Buenos Aires, Argentina

Rugby union career
- Position(s): Fullback, Centre, Fly-half
Senior career
Years	Team	Apps	(Points)
1977–1990	SIC		
International career
Years	Team	Apps	(Points)
1978–1990	Argentina	39	(40)
1980–1982	South American Jaguars	5	(4)
Coaching career
- Years: Team
- 2000–2006: Argentina A
- 2006–2008: SIC

Rafael M. Madero (born 16 July 1958 in Buenos Aires) is a former Argentine rugby union player and coach. He played as a fullback, center, and fly-half.

== Career ==
Starting his career in the SIC, Madero played for the team until 1990; as a wing, centre, and rarely as fly-half, he won eight URBA titles from 1977 to 1988. Internationally capped for Argentina since 1978, he took part to some significant moments of the Pumas in the late 1970s and most of the 1980s: in 1979, at Buenos Aires, during the match against Australia, he scored 8 points (2 tries) of the total 24 with which Argentina won (the other 16 were scored by Hugo Porta). He won the 1987 South American Rugby Championship and in the same year, took part at the first Rugby World Cup: he played his last match in 1990; there were 34 (plus 5 non capped) test matches played, with 33 points (plus 7 scored against a non-official international representative team). Moving to the coaching, in 2000, Madero was in charge of coaching Argentina A, where he was in charge until 2006, when he won the Nations Cup before resigning and coaching San Isidro Club, which he led to the victory in the Nacional de Clubes in 2006 and in 2008.
