= Diego Cash =

Argentine rugby union player (born 1961)

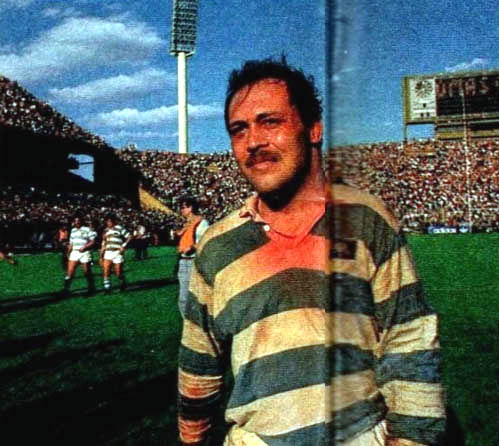
- Cash with Argentina in 1987
- Full name: Diego María Cash
- Born: 10 August 1961 (age 65) Buenos Aires, Argentina

Rugby union career
- Position: Prop
- Current team: retired
Senior career
Years	Team	Apps	(Points)
1980-1994	San Isidro Club		
1985-1992	Argentina	39	(12)

Diego María Cash (born 10 August 1961 in Buenos Aires) is a former Argentine rugby union player, coach and currently director of the rugby session of San Isidro Club. He played as a prop.

== Club career ==
Cash did all his career at San Isidro Club, reaching the first team in 1980. He would win 8 titles of the Torneo de la URBA, in 1980, 1983, 1984, 1986, 1987, 1988, 1993 and 1994, and 2 titles of the Nacional de Clubes, in 1993 and 1994. He would finish his player career in 1994.

Along with clubmate and fellow prop forward Ricardo Card, he was known as one of the 'payment boys'.

== International career ==
Cash had his international debut for a multinational South America team in 1984, playing in two games. He had 39 caps for Argentina, from 1985 to 1992, scoring 3 tries, 12 points on aggregate. He won twice the South American Rugby Championship, in 1985 and 1987. He was called for the 1987 Rugby World Cup, playing in two games, but without scoring. Argentina was eliminated in the 1st round. After winning his third title of the South American Rugby Championship, in 1991, he was called for the 1991 Rugby World Cup. He would play three games, without scoring again, as Argentina left the competition at the 1st round.

== Coach career ==
After finishing his player career, Cash became a coach. He was assistant coach to Marcelo Loffreda during the time he was at the helm of Argentina national team, from 2000 to 2007, including the historical 3rd place at the 2007 Rugby World Cup in France.

A member of the rugby subcommission of San Isidro Club, he became director in 2010.
