= Steve Cutler (rugby union) =

Australian rugby union player

- Born: Stephen Arthur Geoffrey Cutler; 28 July 1960 (age 66)

Rugby union career
- Position: Lock
International career
Years	Team	Apps	(Points)
1982-1991	Australia	40	(16)

Steve Cutler (born 28 July 1960) is an Australian former state and national representative rugby union player who represented Australia in 40 test matches between 1982 and 1991. He is the former CEO of ICON plc.
