= Gustavo Milano =

Argentine rugby union player (born 1961)

- Born: February 11, 1961 (age 65) Rosario, Santa Fe, Argentina

Rugby union career
- Position: Lock
Senior career
Years	Team	Apps	(Points)
1979-1989	Jockey Club		
1989-1991	Rugby San Donà		
1991-1997	Milan		
International career
Years	Team	Apps	(Points)
1982-89	Argentina	30	(24)
1984	South American Jaguars	2	(0)
1990	Italy	1	(0)
Coaching career
- Years: Team
- 1994-1997: Milan

Gustavo Milano (born 11 February 1961 in Rosario) is a former Argentine rugby union footballer, coach and sports agent and dairy products businessman. He played as lock and was an international for Argentina and for Italy. He is nicknamed Tati.

== Career ==
Hailing from Jockey Club Rosario, he played in the club and in the Argentina as lock: he debuted for the Pumas coached by Rodolfo O'Reilly in 1982, during the end of the year test against France, at Toulouse. He quickly earned a role as a starter, alongside Eliseo Branca, playing 30 matches and scoring 6 tries. He played and won the South America Rugby Championship in 1985 and 1987, as well, he took part at the 1987 Rugby World Cup, playing only the match against Fiji, as he was injured during the second half, being substituted by Alejandro Schiavio and later in the tournament, Alejandro Schiavio was made a starting player. In 1989, Milano moved to Italy, playing for San Donà and the UAR excluded him from the national team, as usual with the players who moved abroad at the time. Moving to Milan, he won three scudetti and -as coach- he qualified to the 1994 final lost against L'Aquila: unusually, the following season he returned in the field as player-coach. In 1990, Milano played for Italy, with his only cap for the country being the 1990–92 FIRA Trophy First Division match against Soviet Union in Rovigo on 24 November 1990, where he replaced the number 8 Massimo Giovanelli at the 69' minute.

== After retirement ==
Retiring in 1996, he continued as a coach and later as an agent for Argentine rugby players in working in Europe. In 2002 he became the training coach of UAR, a post he held until 2019. He is one of the main promoters of women's rugby in Argentina and is respected as a leader of the "heartland" due to his dedicated work in locations all over the country. He resides in Santa Fe.
