= Hugo Porta =

Argentina international rugby union player

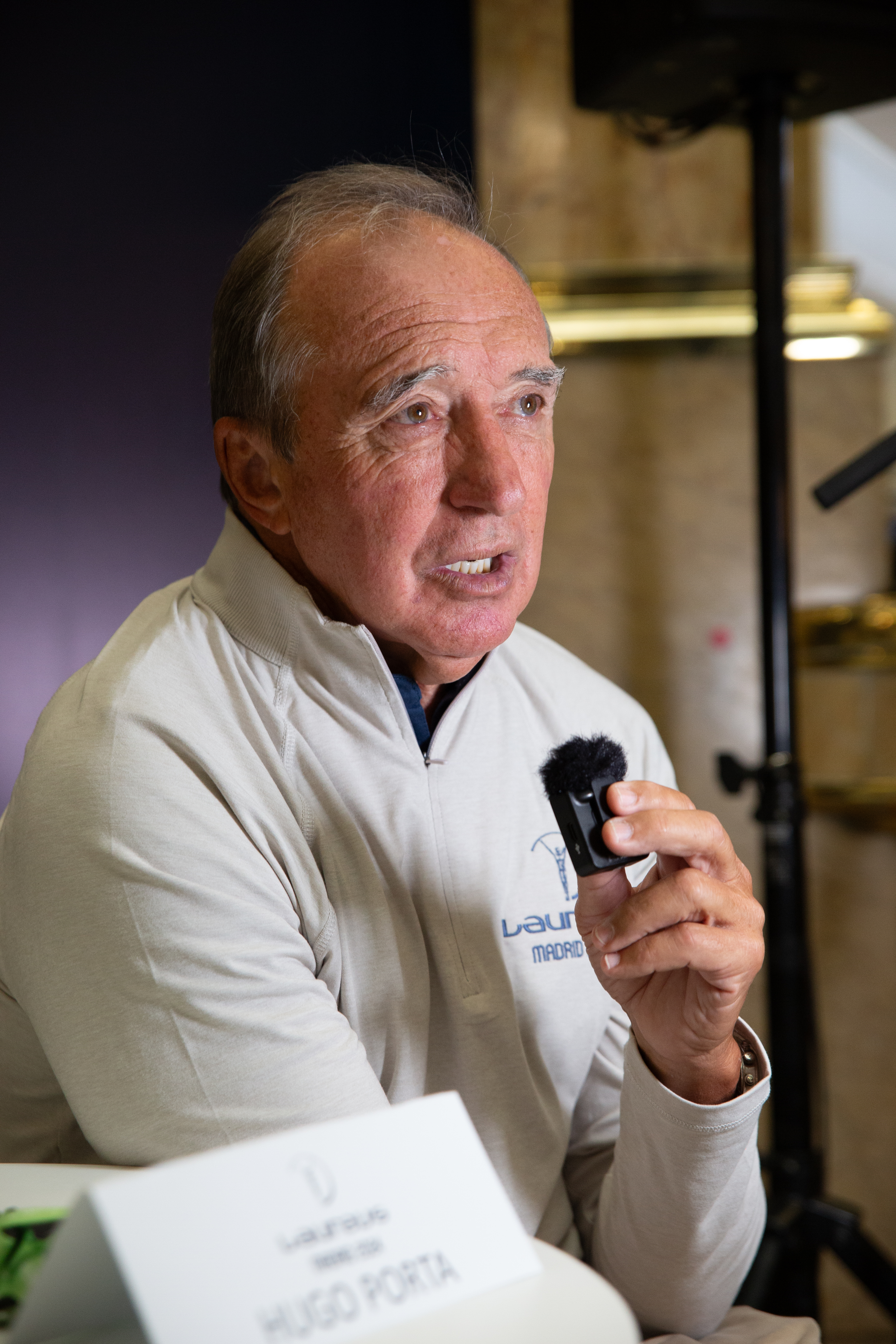
- Porta in 2024
- Born: Hugo Porta; 11 September 1951 (age 75) Buenos Aires, Argentina
- University: UBA
- Occupation: Architect

Rugby union career
- Position: Fly-half
- Current team: Banco Nación
Senior career
Years	Team	Apps	(Points)
1966–90	Banco Nación		(301)
International career
Years	Team	Apps	(Points)
1971–1990	Argentina	58	(590)

Hugo Porta (born 11 September 1951) is an Argentine retired rugby union player. Considered one of the best fly-halves the sport has seen, he is an inductee of both the International Rugby Hall of Fame and IRB Hall of Fame. During the 1970s and 1980s, he played 58 times for Argentina, captaining them on 34 occasions, including leading them during the first World Cup in 1987.

Porta made his international debut in 1971. His best performances for Los Pumas came in the late 1970s and early 1980s, with a draw with France in 1977, a 24–13 win against Australia in 1979, and a 21–21 draw with New Zealand in 1985.

In December 2018, Porta was elected as president of Argentine sports club Banco Nación, where he spent his entire career as player.

== Career ==
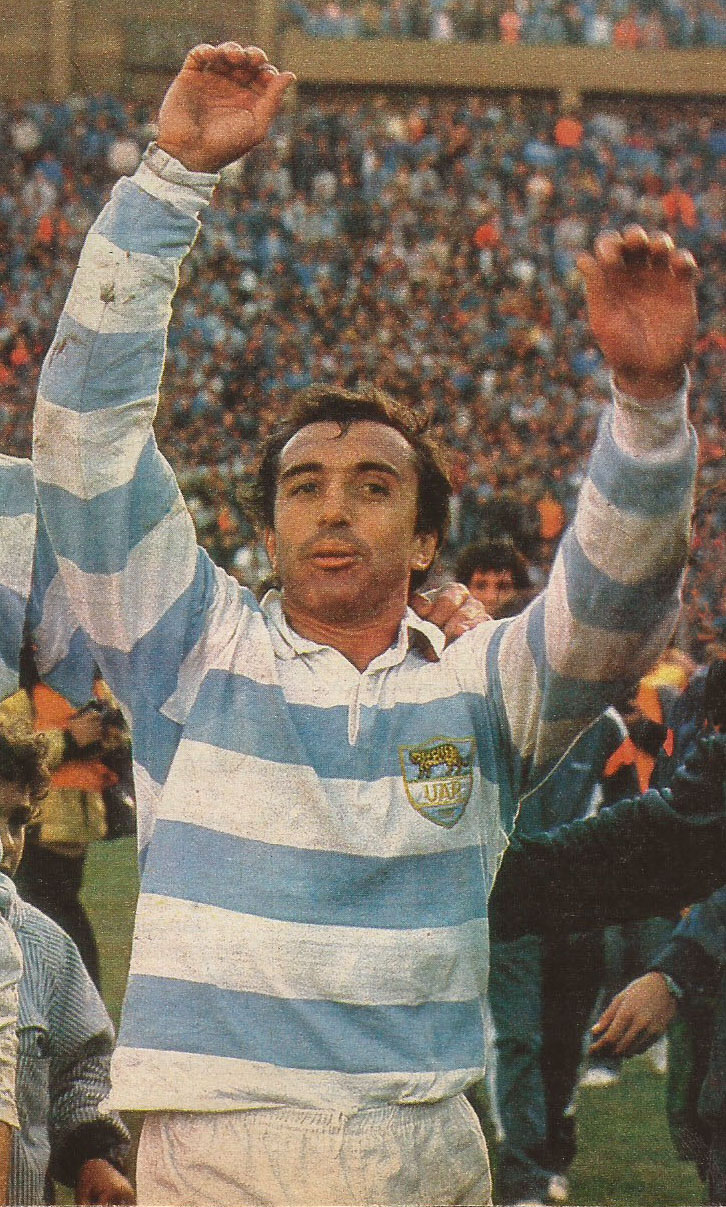
Porta with the national team after a test match against France, 1985

Porta was born in Buenos Aires. He played football (soccer) and almost signed for Boca Juniors but then changed to rugby union, joining Banco Nación. Porta made his debut for Argentina on 10 October 1971 against Chile in the starting line up. He earned another three caps that year in games against Brazil, Paraguay and Uruguay. The following year, Argentina played two games against South Africa in Buenos Aires.

Porta played seven times for the national team the following season, including matches against Romania as well as Ireland and Scotland XVs (non-cap). During the 1974 and 1975 seasons, Argentina played four Tests against France. In 1976, games were also played against Welsh and New Zealand XVs (non-cap). Porta became the national captain in 1977, and in his first game in charge, led the Pumas against France. Argentina lost 3–26, with Porta getting Argentina's only points through a penalty goal. However, in the following match, the nations drew 18–18, Porta providing all of Argentina's points through six penalties, as, for France, did Jean-Michel Aguirre, who also kicked six penalties.

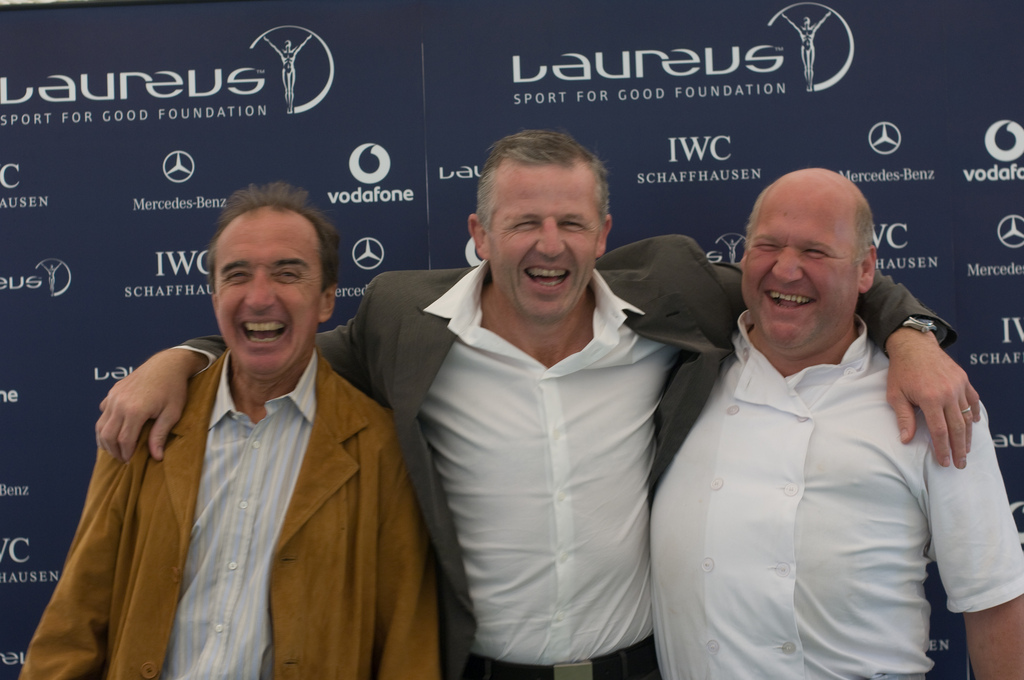
Porta (left) with Sean Fitzpatrick (centre) and Andrew Hunt at the 2008 Laureus Day at Ham Polo Club, London.

Porta led Argentina in two matches during October 1978; against an England XV (non-cap) and Italy. The following season he led the Pumas against a New Zealand XV (non-cap) in a two match series. On 27 October 1979, Porta led Argentina to a victory over Australia in Buenos Aires, winning 24–13. Porta kicked two conversions, one penalty and three drop goals to contribute 18 points during the match. Although the following leg was lost 12–17, the win became a landmark for Argentina.

Porta captained the South American Jaguars on three tours of South Africa between 1980 and 1984. Following the 1980 South America tour, Porta led Argentina to two victories over Fiji, and drew with England in 1981. During the second South America tour in 1982, South America won the second of the two internationals in Bloemfontein, with Porta scoring all of the 21 points in the victory. Argentina also defeated Australia 18–3 in Brisbane at Ballymore in 1983. Another South American tour took place in 1984. Argentina also defeated France 24–16 in June 1985. Following a 20–33 loss to New Zealand that October, the famous 21–21 draw happened on 2 November, with Porta kicking four penalties and three drop goals for 21 points. Porta is the only Argentine player to have represented the South African Barbarians Club.

Porta led Argentina to the 1987 World Cup, at the age of 36 and retired after the tournament. In their first pool match, they lost to Fiji 28–9. The following game saw Argentina win, defeating Italy 25–16. They were defeated 46–15 by New Zealand in the last game. He came out of retirement briefly in 1990 to play games against Ireland, England and Scotland. In 1991, he was appointed Argentine Ambassador to South Africa by President Carlos Menem, and in 1994, became Argentina's Minister for Sport. In 2000, his car was carjacked by thieves in Buenos Aires, but they returned his vehicle after reading whose car they had stolen in the newspapers.

In September 2007, former England captain Will Carling included Porta among his list of top ten rugby players of all time. Former Australian fly-half Mark Ella wrote of Porta that, "I've never played against a better five-eighth."

== Honours and awards ==
=== Club ===
Banco Nación

- Torneo de la URBA (2): 1986, 1989
- Sevens championship (4): 1974, 1984, 1987, 1988

=== Individual honours ===
- Olimpia de Oro Award (for "sportsman of the year" in Argentina): 1985
- Olimpia de Plata Award (for "rugby union player of the year" in Argentina): 1975, 1977, 1978, 1980, 1982
- Midi Olimpique Magazine: "Best rugby union player of the world" (1985)
- Rothmans Yearbook Magazine: "Best Fly-half of the 1980s" (1989).
- Member of the Rugby hall of fame of New Zealand.
- All-time 2nd test player with most drop goals: 28
- All-time top scorer of Argentina primera división: 301 points
- All-time 2nd scorer of Argentina national team: 590 points (1970–90)
- Enter to the Guinness World Records due to having scored seven penalties and a conversion in the same match (in 1982 versus the Springboks).

== See also ==
- International Rugby Hall of Fame
- IRB Hall of Fame

Awards
Preceded by (Argentina) Santos Benigno Laciar	Olimpia de Oro; 1985	Succeeded by (Argentina) Diego Maradona
