= Steve Tuynman =

- Born: Steven Norman Tuynman; 30 May 1963 (age 63) Sydney, New South Wales, Australia

Rugby union career
- Position: Number 8
International career
Years	Team	Apps	(Points)
1983-1990	Australia	34	(20)

Steve Tuynman (born 30 May 1963) is an Australian former representative rugby union player. He played in 34 tests for the Wallabies between 1983 and 1990. Tuynman was raised in Sydney and his senior schooling was at Hunters Hill High School.
