= Fabián Turnes =

Argentine rugby union player (born 1965)

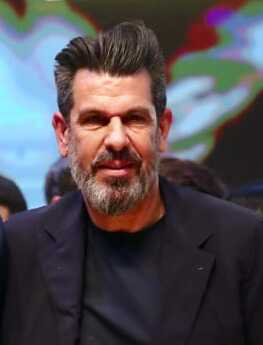
- Born: January 12, 1965 (age 61) Buenos Aires
- Height: 5 ft 11 in (1.80 m)
- Weight: 185 lb (84 kg; 13.2 st)

Rugby union career
- Position: Centre
Senior career
Years	Team	Apps	(Points)
1985-1989	Banco Nación		
1989-1991	Amatori Rugby San Donà		
1991-1994	Cesena Rugby Club		
1994-1996	Amatori Catania		
1997-1998	Banco Nación		
International career
Years	Team	Apps	(Points)
1984-1997	Argentina	29	(63)

Fabián Turnes (born January 12, 1965, in Buenos Aires) is a former Argentine rugby union player and a current coach. He played as a centre.

Turnes played at Banco Nación, from 1983/84 to 1988/89, where he won two titles of Argentine Champion, in 1985/86 and 1988/89. He then would play for Amatori Rugby San Donà (1989/90), Cesena and Amatori Catania, in Italy, returning for two final seasons at Banco Nación, where he would end his career in 1997/98. He then started a coaching career.

He had 29 caps for Argentina, from 1985 to 1997, scoring 63 points, 5 tries, 5 conversions, 10 penalties and 1 drop goal. He played two matches at the 1987 Rugby World Cup finals.

He was nominated, after the 2007 Rugby World Cup finals, one of the head coaches of Argentina, with Santiago Phelan.

Preceded by Marcelo Loffreda	Argentina rugby union coach with Santiago Phelan; 2008-2013	Succeeded by Daniel Hourcade
