= Michael Murray =

Michael or Mike Murray may refer to:

- Michael Murray (organist) (born 1943), American-born organist
- Michael Murray, lead character played by Robert Lindsay in the British TV serial G.B.H.
- Mike Murray (cricketer) (born 1930), English administrator, banker and cricketer
- Mike Murray (ice hockey) (born 1966), one-gamer in the National Hockey League
- Michael Murray, guitarist with Tim Walsh
- Michael Murray (director) (born 1932), American film director, producer and educator
- Michael Murray (rugby union), Australian rugby union player
- Mick Murray (Irish republican) (died 1999), Irish republican activist
- Michael J. Murray, American philosopher
- Michael E. Murray, American philosopher

== See also ==
- Mick Murray (disambiguation)
