= List of failed and overturned convictions involving the West Midlands Serious Crime Squad =

Between 1974 and 1989, the West Midlands Police force operated the West Midlands Serious Crime Squad. It was disbanded after allegations of endemic misconduct, leading to a series of unsafe convictions. These included allegations that officers had falsified confessions in witness statements, denied suspects access to solicitors and used torture such as "plastic bagging" to partially suffocate suspects in order to extract confessions. They were alleged to have abused payments to informers. A series of around 40 prosecutions failed in the late 1980s as defendants showed that evidence had or may have been tampered with. West Yorkshire Police led an investigation which led to a small number of internal disciplinary proceedings, but did not recommend any prosecutions for lack of evidence. However, over 60 convictions secured from their investigations have now been quashed, including those of the Birmingham Six and Bridgewater Four. The failed prosecutions and overturned convictions are listed here in two separate tables.

== List of failed prosecutions ==
Accused	Problem	Result	Year
David Moss; Rashan Khela; Brian Ward; John Rowley; Malcolm Firksins; James Redmond; John Braniff	Confessions obtained improperly	Charges dropped	1981
Carla Nota Antonio	Fabricated confession	Acquitted	1982
George Twitchell	Subjected to duress Timings inconsistent	Acquitted	1982
Derek Gordon	Fabricated confession	Charges dropped	1982
Malcolm Herring	Fabricated confession	Acquitted	1985
William Barrett; Calvin Walters; Donald Patterson	Evidence planted confessions fabricated	Acquitted	1986
Clifford Jones; John o'Brien; Chris Turner; Harry Elwell	Confessions fabricated Timings inconsistent	Judge directed acquittal	1987
John Bullivant; Hubert Forbes; Leo Morgan; Wesley Stewart	Evidence planted confessions fabricated Timings inconsistent Flawed identification Missing document	Acquitted	1987
Paul Dandy	Confession fabricated	Charges dropped	1987
Norman Manning; Derek Manning	Planted forensic evidence Tainted by Dandy case	Charges dropped	1988
Vincent Palmer	Tainted by Dandy case	Charges dropped	1988
Jahved Akhtar; Tracy Evans	improperly organised identity parades	Judge directed acquittal	1988
Eileen McCabe	Denied solicitor Confessed under duress	Judge directed acquittal	1988
Leroy Francis; Ramsingh Nowjadicksingh	DC Shaw discredited as witness Missing surveillance evidence	Acquitted	1988
Paul FitzSimmons	DC McManus discredited as witness Confessed under duress Evidence lost	Judge directed acquittal	1988
Robert Burston; Alexander Davies; Ernest Callaghan; Anthony Waldron	Original interview notes lost Fabricated forensic evidence	Judge directed acquittal	1988
Paul Harris	Confession fabricated denied access to solicitor	Judge directed acquittal	1989
Gibbs; Samuels; Francis	Confessions extracted under duress Fabrication of evidence Undue pressure on witness	Charges dropped	1989
Ronnie Bolden	Confession fabricacted Fabrication of defence solicitor attempting bribe Fabricated forensic evidence	Acquitted	1989
Harry Allan	Undue pressure on witness	Charges dropped	1990

Table derived from Kaye 1991, pp. 87–9

== List of convictions quashed at appeal ==
Below are the names of those whose trials were re-examined after their investigations by the West Midlands Serious Crime Squad and subsequent convictions were thought to be potentially unsound. Also included is the later case of Lloyd George Fraser, involving former officers of the squad, where the conviction was quashed because of their involvement. Three others had their convictions quashed in 1985, before the allegations of systemic misconduct were widely accepted (see Tarlochan Singh Gill).

Name	Status	Case date	Appeal date	Notes
Paul Alberici	Conviction quashed	1986	1999	Convicted with Clancy
Gary M Binham	Conviction quashed		Before 1994	
Michael T Bromell	Conviction quashed		Before 1994	
Donald Brown	Conviction quashed	1979	1999	Same case as Ronald and John Brown, and Treadaway
Ronald Brown	Conviction quashed	1979	1999	Same case as John and Donald Brown, Dunne and Treadaway
John Lewis Brown	Conviction quashed	1979	2005	Same case as Ronald and Donald Brown, Dunne and Treadaway
Hugh Callaghan	Conviction quashed	1974	1991	Birmingham Six
Trevor Campbell	Conviction quashed	1984	1999	
Geoffrey Cheetham	Conviction quashed		Before 1994	
Thomas Clancy	Conviction quashed	1986	1996	Three years before his co-defendant Alberici
Valentine P Cooke	Conviction quashed		Before 1994	
John Joseph Cummiskey	Conviction quashed	1984	2003	Convicted with Roy Meads
Michael Dunne	Conviction quashed	1979	2011	Same case as John, Ronald and Donald Brown, and Treadaway
John Edwards	Conviction quashed		1991	
Martin Foran	Conviction quashed	1984	2013	
Martin Foran	Conviction quashed	1978	2014	
Adolphus Francis	Conviction quashed		Before 1994	
Lloyd George Fraser	Conviction quashed	1991	2003	Former officers of the squad, after it had been disbanded
Raymond Fryer	Conviction quashed		Before 1994	
Gerard Gall	Conviction quashed		Before 1994	
Ronald T Gall	Conviction quashed		Before 1994	
Patrick Gaughan	Conviction quashed	1979	1999	Same case as Ronald and Donald Brown, Dunne and Treadaway
Tarlochan Singh Gill + 3 ors	Conviction quashed	1984	1994	
Christopher Hagans	Conviction quashed		2011	
Delroy Hare	Conviction quashed		Before 1994	
Robert Haughton	Conviction quashed		Before 1994	
Paddy Hill	Conviction quashed	1974	1991	Birmingham Six
George A Hinds	Conviction quashed		Before 1994	
Leslie B Horobin	Conviction quashed		Before 1994	
Gerard Hunter	Conviction quashed	1974	1991	Birmingham Six
Patrick Irvine	Conviction quashed	1980	2011	
Elvis Jeffers	Conviction quashed		Before 1994	
Hassan Khan	Conviction quashed		Before 1991	See also Hansard 1991, p. 1224
George G Lewis	Conviction quashed	1987	Before 1994	
Paul R Lindo	Conviction quashed		Before 1994	
Daniel Lynch	Conviction quashed		Before 1994	
Trevor McCalla	Conviction quashed		1995	Served 18 months
John Lyon Mccloy	Conviction quashed	1980	2011	
Richard McIlkenny	Conviction quashed	1974	1991	Birmingham Six
Thomas Dennis Mcmillan	Conviction quashed		2012	
Roy Meads	Conviction quashed	1984	1996	Convicted with Cummiskey
David Murphy	Conviction quashed		2006	With Patrick O'Toole
Anne Marie Murray	Conviction quashed		2003	
Patrick O'Toole	Conviction quashed		2006	With David Murphy
Keith Parchment	Conviction quashed		1991	
Billy Power	Conviction quashed	1974	1991	Birmingham Six
Patrick Smith	Conviction quashed		Before 1994	
Tanochan	Conviction quashed		Before 1994	
Derek Treadaway	Conviction quashed	1979	1996	Same case as Dunne and John, Ronald and Donald Brown
Trevor McCalla	Conviction quashed		Before 1994	
Keith Twitchell	Conviction quashed	1980	2002	
John Walker	Conviction quashed	1974	1991	Birmingham Six
Anthony Wellington	Conviction quashed		1991	
Constantine Wellington	Conviction quashed		Before 1994	
Kevin Wilcox	Conviction quashed		Before 1994	
Lawrence Wilcox	Conviction quashed		2010	
Seymour Williams	Conviction quashed		Before 1994	
John Wilson	Conviction quashed		2011	

List derived from MOJUK 2018

== List of overturned convictions from the Regional Crime Squad ==
Name	Status	Case date	Appeal date	Notes
Vincent Hickey	Conviction quashed	1978	1997	Bridgewater Four
Michael Hickey	Conviction quashed	1978	1997	Bridgewater Four
Pat Molloy	Conviction quashed	1978	1997	Bridgewater Four
James Robinson	Conviction quashed	1978	1997	Bridgewater Four

== See also ==
- West Midlands Serious Crime Squad
- List of miscarriage of justice cases in the United Kingdom

== Sources ==
=== News articles ===
- Mullin, John (23 March 1991). "Six detectives in 'evidence plot'". Guardian.
- Kirby, Terry (15 January 1993). "Seven detectives to face disciplinary charges: After an inquiry costing millions, the action against West Midlands Serious Crime Squad officers has attracted criticism". Independent.
- Haycock, Gavin (13 October 1993). "Police pay 70,000 pounds to wrongfully arrested man". UPI Archives.
- Kirby, Terry (28 January 1994). "Murder conviction quashed". Independent.
- Graves, David (31 July 1997). "Bridgewater Four convictions quashed". Daily Telegraph. Archived from the original on 19 October 2002.
- BBC News (19 January 1998). "Compensation for 'confession' man". BBC News.
- Staff reporter (1999). "Man's convictions quashed after 'classic' squad set-up". Birmingham Post.
- Burrell, Ian (1 November 1999). "West Midlands Serious Crime Squad: Police unit to blame for 'dozens more injustices'". The Independent.
- BBC News (28 November 2003). "Robbery conviction quashed". BBC News.
- Coventry Live (28 November 2003). "Man's conviction quashed by court". Coventry Live.
- Bourke, Fionnuala (18 December 2005). "Cleared of robbery after 22-year fight". Free library (Birmingham Post and Mail).
- BBC News (24 February 2006). "Leyland robbery sentences quashed". BBC News Online.
- Birmingham Post & Mail (2010). "Conviction is quashed - 30 years on". Free Online Library.
- BBC News (21 December 2010). "Ex-detective jailed for post office armed robbery bid". BBC News.
- Morton, James (29 May 2011). "Dame Barbara Mills obituary: Barrister and first female director of public prosecutions". Guardian.
- Birmingham Live (6 October 2011a). "Shocking police tactics saw trio wrongly jailed". Birmingham Live.
- Birmingham Live (13 October 2011b). "Innocent men robbed of their liberty by Serious Crime Squad". Birmingham Live.
- Bassey, Amardeep (3 March 2013). "Drunk cop who fell to his death included on memorial to officers who died in line of duty". Birmingham Live.
- McCarthy, Nick (17 April 2013). "Pensioner jailed for pub robbery in 1985 cleared after 28-year battle". Birmingham Live.
- Carter, Helen (15 August 2013). "'Double' miscarriage of justice victim Martin Foran speaks". BBC News.
- Carter, Helen (17 October 2014). "Martin Foran wins second miscarriage of justice appeal". BBC News Online.
- Mullin, Chris (1 June 2016). "I fear the Birmingham bombings inquest will only bring heartache". Guardian Comment is Free.
- Lockley, Mike (14 June 2016). "Vincent Hickey had called for murder case to be reopened". Birmingham Live.

=== Judgments ===
- Rose (18 November 1996). "R. v. Derek Treadaway [1996] EWCA Crim 1457". Networked Knowledge. England and Wales Court of Appeal (Criminal Division) Decisions.
- Unknown (14 October 1999). "R. v. Trevor Campbell [1999] EWCA Crim 2264".
- Rose; Jowitt; Hooper (26 October 1999). "R. v. Keith Twitchell [2000] 1 Cr.App.R. 373". Networked Knowledge. England and Wales Court of Appeal (Criminal Division) Decisions.
- Mitchell; Keith (14 January 2002). "Irvine, R v [2002] EWCA Crim 29". Bailii. England and Wales Court of Appeal (Criminal Division) Decisions.
- Kay; Gibbs; Evans (24 January 2003a). "Murray, R v [2003] EWCA Crim 27". Bailii.
- Auld; Aikens; Grigson (2 October 2003). "Fraser, R v [2003] EWCA Crim 3180". Bailii.
- Kay; Gibbs; Evans (27 November 2003b). "Cummiskey, R v [2003] EWCA Crim 3933". Bailii.
- Laws; Collins; Silber (24 February 2006). "O'Toole, R v [2006] EWCA Crim 951". Bailii.
- Leveson; Mitting; Miles (16 April 2013). "Foran v R [2013] EWCA Crim 437". Bailii.
- Pitchford; Dingemans; William Davis (17 October 2014). "Foran v R [2014] EWCA Crim 2047". Bailii. England and Wales Court of Appeal (Criminal Division) Decisions.

=== Parliament ===
- Hansard (January 1989a), "West Midlands Serious Crime Squad, HC Debate", Hansard, Parliament, col. 1155-60
- Hansard (26 October 1989b), "West Midlands Police (Investigation), HC Debate", Hansard, Parliament, col. 1036-40
- Hansard (12 December 1991), "PC Tony Salt: HC Debate", Hansard, Parliament, col. 1221-8
- Hansard (16 February 1994), "House of Commons Hansard for 16 Feb 1994", Hansard, House of Commons, col. 781

=== Reports ===
- Kaye, Tim (1991). Unsafe and Unsatisfactory? The Report of the independent inquiry into the Working Practices of the West Midlands Serious Crime Squad. London: Civil Liberties Trust. ISBN 0900137355.

=== Books ===
- Foot, Paul (1997). Murder at the Farm. Review. ISBN 9780747258704.
- Walker, Clive; Starmer, Keir (1999). Miscarriages of Justice: A Review of Justice in Error. Blackstone Press. ISBN 9781854316875.
- Allen, Christophe (1994). Sourcebook on Evidence. Routledge. ISBN 9781135353179.
- Naughton, Michael (2013). The Innocent and the Criminal Justice System: A Sociological Analysis of Miscarriages of Justice. Macmillan International Higher Education. ISBN 9781137341150.
- Plimmer, John (2017). The Lost Paragons: The story of the notorious West Midlands Serious Crime Squad. Amazon Digital Services LLC - KDP Print US. p. 277. ISBN 978-1520692593.

=== Journal articles ===
- Davis, Tom (1994). "ESDA and the Analysis of Contested Contemporaneous Notes of Police Interviews". Forensic Linguistics (1). Routledge: 71–89.

=== Video and television ===
- Bell, Andrew (12 February 1990), "A Force to be Reckoned With, West Midlands Serious Crime Squad'", World in Action, 26 (18)

=== Other ===
- Statewatch (September 1992). "Thirteen released" (PDF). Statewatch Bulletin. 2 (5): 3.
- Inside Justice (2018). "Historic cases". Inside Justice.
- MOJUK (2018). "West Midlands Serious Crime Squad". Miscarriages of Justice UK.
- Olliers Solicitors (17 October 2014). "Martin Foran Makes It A Double At The Court Of Appeal". Olliers Solicitors.
- Safari (June 2012). "R V Thomas Dennis Mcmillan [2012] EWCA Crim 226" (PDF). Safari (86): 2.
