= 1986 Australia rugby union tour of New Zealand =

Summary
P	W	D	L
Total
14	11	1	2
Test match
3	2	0	1
Opponent
P	W	D	L
New Zealand
3	2	0	1

The 1986 Australia rugby union tour of New Zealand was a series of matches played by Australia national rugby union team in New Zealand between July and September 1986. Australia won the series against New Zealand with two victories in three matches.

The All Black team in the 1st test was known as the "Baby Blacks" as the majority of them had only played the one test, against France at Christchurch. They were brought in as replacements due to most of the incumbent team having been banned for two test matches for going on the unofficial New Zealand Cavaliers tour to South Africa. The Baby Blacks surprised many by beating France by 18 points to 9. The Baby Blacks were unable to beat the more experienced Australian team although it was a closely fought match with only a one point margin.

For the 2nd test some of the Cavaliers were brought back into the All Black team.

The final game at Eden Park marked the last time the Wallabies beat the All Blacks there.

== Results ==
Scores and results list Australia's points tally first.

Opposing Team	For	Against	Date	Venue	Status
Waikato	21	21	23 July 1986	Hamilton	Tour match
Manawatu	9	6	26 July 1986	Palmerston North	Tour match
Wairarapa Bush	18	6	30 July 1986	Masterton	Tour match
Counties	21	3	2 August 1986	Pukekohe	Tour match
Wanganui	24	14	5 August 1986	Wanganui	Tour match
New Zealand	13	12	9 August 1986	Athletic Park, Wellington	Test match
Buller	62	0	12 August 1986	Westport	Tour match
Canterbury	10	30	16 August 1986	Lancaster Park, Christchurch	Tour match
South Canterbury	33	11	19 August 1986	Timaru	Tour match
New Zealand	12	13	23 August 1986	Carisbrook, Dunedin	Test match
Southland	55	0	27 August 1986	Invercargill	Tour match
Bay of Plenty	41	13	30 August 1986	Rotorua	Tour match
Thames Valley	31	7	2 September 1986	Thames	Tour match
New Zealand	22	9	6 September 1986	Eden Park, Auckland	Test match

== Tour party ==
Players:

- Matt Burke
- Gregg Burrow
- Bill Calcraft
- Bill Campbell
- David Campese
- Michael Cook
- Steve Cutler
- Glen Ella
- Damien Frawley
- Nick Farr-Jones
- Julian Gardner
- Peter Grigg
- Mark Hartill
- Steve James
- Tom Lawton
- Andrew Leeds
- Michael Lynagh
- Mark McBain
- Rod McCall
- James McInerney
- Jeff Miller
- Craig Morton (joined team during the tour)
- Michael Murray
- Brett Papworth
- Simon Poidevin (tour vice-captain)
- Ross Reynolds
- Enrique Rodriguez
- Andrew Slack (tour captain)
- Brian Smith
- Steve Tuynman
- Ian Williams

Coach: Alan Jones

Manager: Ken P Grayling, South Australia

== Sources ==
- Vivian Jenkins, ed. (1987). Rothmans Rugby Yearbook 1987–88. Rothmans Publications Ltd. ISBN 0-354-09087-9.
