= Louise Hunt =

Louise Hunt may refer to:

- Louise Hunt (coroner), British coroner
- Louise Hunt (tennis) (born 1991), British wheelchair tennis player
- Louise Hunt, British woman killed in the 2024 Bushey killings
