= Mick Murray =

Mick Murray may refer to:

- Mick Murray (Irish republican) (c. 1936–1999), Irish Republican Army bomber, best known for his role in the Birmingham pub bombings
- Mick Murray (politician) (born 1949), member of the Western Australian Legislative Assembly
- Mick Murray (leader), leader of the Comanchero Motorcycle Club

== See also ==
- Michael Murray (disambiguation)
