= James McInerney (rugby union) =

James Leslie McInerney
- Full name: James Leslie McInerney
- Born: 23 July 1959 (age 67) Sydney, Australia
- Height: 194 cm (6 ft 4 in)
- Weight: 110 kg (243 lb)
- School: St Joseph's College
- University: University of Sydney; University of Queensland

Rugby union career
- Position: No. 8
International career
Years	Team	Apps	(Points)
1986	Australia		

James Leslie McInerney (born 23 July 1959) is an Australian former rugby union player.

Raised in Sydney, McInerney attended St Joseph's College, Hunters Hill, where he had three years with the 1st XV and was team captain in 1978. He played his early first-grade rugby for Sydney University, partnering Nick Farr-Jones in the back row. In 1984, McInerney made his state debut for the Waratahs on a tour of New Zealand.

McInerney won a Wallabies call up for their 1986 tour of New Zealand, playing uncapped matches against Waikato, Buller, South Canterbury, Southland and Thames Valley. He missed three weeks of the tour with a leg injury after a Waikato forward took a chunk out of McInerney's calf muscle with a stray boot.

In 1988, McInerney relocated to Brisbane and began playing for the University of Queensland, from where he was capped three times by Queensland, before a neck injury forced him to retire.
