= Greggory Burrow =

Greg Burrow
- Full name: Greggory Howard Burrow
- Born: 15 May 1962 (age 64) Sydney, Australia
- Height: 180 cm (5 ft 11 in)
- Weight: 100 kg (220 lb)
- School: Shore School
- University: University of Sydney
- Occupation: Orthopaedic surgeon

Rugby union career
- Position: Prop
International career
Years	Team	Apps	(Points)
1984–86	Australia		

Greggory Howard Burrow (born 15 May 1962) is an Australian former rugby union player.

Burrow was educated at Shore School in Sydney and first began playing rugby with the Collaroy Cougars. He gained Australian Schools selection in 1980 and spent two seasons with the University of Sydney seconds before making his first-grade debut in 1984. By the end of his debut season in first-grade, Burrow had achieved Australian Universities and New South Wales representative honours, followed by his maiden Wallabies call up.

A tighthead prop, Burrow twice toured with the Wallabies. He was an injury replacement for Cameron Lillicrap during the 1984 "grand slam" tour of Britain and Ireland and made his Wallabies debut in a tour fixture against Midlands Division, one of six uncapped matches he started over the course the tour. His next international opportunity was on the 1986 tour of New Zealand, where he featured in another seven uncapped matches.

Burrow became an orthopaedic surgeon and was a lieutenant in the Royal Australian Navy.
