= West Midlands Serious Crime Squad =

British police unit, 1974-1989

Agency overview
- Formed: 1974
- Dissolved: 1989

Jurisdictional structure
- Operations jurisdiction: England, UK
- Area: 11,203 km^{2} (4,326 sq mi)
- Population: 4,822,500
- Legal jurisdiction: England & Wales
- General nature: Local civilian police

Operational structure
- Parent agency: West Midlands Police

The West Midlands Serious Crime Squad was a police unit in the English West Midlands which operated from 1974 to 1989. It was disbanded after an investigation into allegations of incompetence and abuse of power on the part of some of the squad's members. Some of this misconduct resulted in wrongful convictions, including the high-profile case of the Birmingham Six. The sister Regional Crime Squad, based in Bilston, was responsible for the investigation of the Bridgewater Four.

At least 40 convictions failed in the 1980s as a result of probable malpractice, including tampering with evidence. As cases began to regularly collapse in the late 1980s, pressure mounted to investigate the squad; Clare Short raised the issue in Parliament in January 1989. The Birmingham Six convictions were overturned in 1991. A series of other, lower-profile convictions based on the squad's investigations were overturned on appeal, including the cases of George Glen Lewis, Keith Twitchell and (on 17 October 2014) Martin Foran, who had been wrongly convicted in 1978 of four counts of robbery. By January 2017, 60 appellants had had their convictions overturned. Over 100 cases collapsed or were overturned on appeal.

The squad was shut down by Chief Constable Geoffrey Dear in August 1989, and the West Yorkshire Police was asked by the Police Complaints Authority to investigate the squad's activities since 1986. The Birmingham Six and Bridgewater Four cases were out of scope, although there was staff crossover with the regional squad. The West Yorkshire Police published a 1994 report leading to disciplinary action against seven officers, but recommended against prosecution for lack of evidence. Ten officers avoided disciplinary action by resigning or retiring early, and around 100 received advice about police procedures. Director of Public Prosecutions Barbara Mills agreed with the report and did not attempt to prosecute any officers, for which she was widely criticised.

== History ==
=== Formation of the squad ===
The Serious Crime Squad (SCS) was formed in 1974 when the West Midlands Police was created by the Local Government Act 1972, merging Birmingham City Police with parts of a number of other forces covering the West Midlands region. The squad's roots go back to 1952, when a Special Crime Squad was formed on an experimental basis. It successfully dealt with a number of metal thieves, a crime that had increased due to the growth of scrap-metal collection from bomb sites in the postwar era. A second Regional Crime Squad was formed with officers from neighbouring counties to deal with crimes outside Birmingham. In 1960, when it was known as the Birmingham Crime Squad, it detected over 1,060 crimes and made 579 arrests. Annual reports emphasise that the seriousness of the crimes, rather than their quantity, was the key factor in its performance.

=== Early work ===
The squad dealt with the 1974 Birmingham pub bombings, bringing its work to national attention. It continued to deal with anti-terrorist investigations until 1979, when a separate squad was formed. The SCS reoriented its work, primarily towards armed robberies. That year, the SCS moved to shared offices with other West Midlands police units in Lloyd House.

In 1979–80, the SCS investigated a spate of armed robberies known as the Thursday Robberies; the gang was known as the Thursday Gang by police. The SCS and Robbery Squads worked together to catch the criminals responsible in Operation Cat. According to the 1991 Independent Report of the SCS, "[M]any Midlands solicitors we have spoken to believe [this operation] gave the green light to some officers ... to indulge in serious malpractice". Arrests included Ronald, Donald, and John Brown, whose convictions were later overturned. After the murder of a security guard in 1980, the SCS arrested John Irvine and Keith Twitchell for armed robbery; their convictions were also overturned.

=== 1980s and declining performance ===
By 1982, the number of arrests by SCS had declined to under 200; they remained approximately this low through the decade, despite a steady increase in reported crime and arrests in the West Midlands. As a percentage of arrests made by West Midlands Police as a whole, their work was declining. Many of the arrests were for less-serious crimes, with burglary and theft accounting for around half of the arrests. Explanations included that criminals were becoming more sophisticated and less "amenable" to confessing. The West Midlands Police explained in 1988, "Investigations are more protracted, and masks, disguises, false number plates and other means of evading capture are frequently used", techniques which are not unusual by hardened criminals committing serious crimes. According to Tim Kaye, police management knew that the excuses were thin and the squad was underperforming throughout the 1980s.

In 1984, the squad began to rely heavily on supergrass evidence. These informants later proved unreliable, but led to a number of high-profile arrests. By the mid-1980s, colleagues "resented the 'support'" of the squad and avoided collaboration and referrals; this further reduced the squad's ability to pursue serious crime.

The district auditor strongly criticised the organisation's poor management in 1985 and 1989. West Midlands Police said that the SCS was being reorganised in 1988, with changes to recruitment practices, shortly before it was closed down.

The Police and Criminal Evidence Act 1984 should have changed many practices at the SCS (such as introducing the recording of interviews), and was noted as implemented in the 1986 annual report. Subsequent evidence indicated that its provisions were being widely ignored or evaded.

=== Rising concerns ===
Throughout the 1980s, there were concerns about the Birmingham Six convictions. Chris Mullin campaigned as an MP to see the convictions reviewed. Concerns about the Bridgewater Four, who had been investigated by the sister No. 4 Regional Crime Squad, were investigated by Paul Foot.

A number of cases had been overturned in the 1980s, and several members of the squad were seen as unreliable witnesses. Concerns were given particular credence due to a new forensic technique using an Electrostatic Detection Apparatus (ESDA). The technique allowed forensic experts to trace impressions made on sheets of paper underneath the original, often showing when words or lines had been added to original statements. The first case using this evidence was that of Paul Dandy in 1987.

In January 1989, Birmingham Ladywood MP Clare Short raised in Parliament the problems that Birmingham solicitors had encountered when trying to file complaints concerning the squad about their clients' cases. Short detailed the apparently-widespread squad practice of doctoring statements by adding additional incriminating pages, which was leading to convictions being challenged. Nevertheless, systemic squad issues such as an apparent culture of taking shortcuts and abusing procedure to perform well enough to qualify for promotion were not being addressed.

=== Disbandment and investigation ===
In August 1989, the squad was disbanded by Chief Constable Geoffrey Dear and a number of its senior officers were assigned to desk duty. That month, a West Yorkshire Police investigation by led by Assistant Chief Constable Donald Shaw was asked to examine allegations of misconduct by the squad. Its remit was limited to complaints made after the start of 1986, "when complaints about the squad started to emerge". The question of the Birmingham pub bombings convictions was raised at the time, but was considered by the government to be out of scope and unnecessary. A number of former SCS officers who had been placed on desk duty were returned to investigatory roles in 1990, after Dear left for another post and was replaced by Ronald Hadfield.

=== Inquiries and decision not to prosecute officers ===
The Civil Liberties Trust funded Birmingham University legal academic Tim Kaye to lead an independent inquiry, backed by an advisory panel which included Clare Short and Bishop of Birmingham Mark Santer. It reported in 1991, three years before the official inquiry, and presented evidence of systemic malpractice and patterns of fabrication of evidence and other procedural abuses by specific officers.

The PCA report, published in 1994, concluded that there had been "physical abuse of prisoners, fabrication of admissions, planting of evidence and mishandling of informants". Seven officers faced disciplinary action as a result of the report, for 28 complaints. One officer faced a complaint about tampering with a statement, and the other six were suspected of irregularities related to payments to informers. Ten more officers would have faced 20 complaints, but had resigned or retired. Another 102 officers were given informal advice about their failure to adhere to police procedure. The disciplinary procedures were conducted as an internal matter, and the report recommended that no officers should face criminal charges.

Director of Public Prosecutions Barbara Mills agreed that there was insufficient evidence to prosecute any officer at the squad, a decision for which she was widely criticised. No officers were prosecuted for their roles in corrupt investigations but former West Midlands Serious Crime Squad detective Laurence Henry Shaw was later convicted of attempted robbery in Solihull in 2001, and in 2010 for armed robbery in Lostwithiel, Cornwall.

== Issues and malpractice ==
The SCS had a number of issues ranging from poor recruitment and management practices to well-documented, repeated falsification. Poor management led to poor performance, which pressured officers to take shortcuts. (Note: This list of issues is mostly derived from the information set out in Kaye 1991.)

=== Management issues ===
The SCS had an "elite" ethos which may have induced arrogance in dealing with other investigators. Recruitment was usually through choice, rather than open recruitment. The SCS was an all-male, probably wholly-white unit; officers tended to serve for long periods rather than move regularly, and were allowed to work long overtime hours. These factors may have reinforced an insular culture. Incidents were recorded of bullying officers who reported malpractice.

The general West Midlands interview manual was criticised as misleading, advising officers to assume guilt in a range of situations where it may not be true. The manual appeared to be a compendium of techniques and experience from officers, rather than based on independent psychological research and evidence. Reactions to interviews are made under stress and need to be treated with caution, but the manual offered interpretations of various reactions as likely signs of guilt. The advice included contradictory interpretations of similar reactions – for instance, insisting on innocence and complaining about treatment was noted in different parts of the manual as indicating innocence or guilt. The Guardian concluded that West Midlands Police should "adopt the approach of [the] Mersey scheme, with its emphasis on teaching the police to listen and frame questions. Research shows the biggest mistake in interrogation is the failure to listen to what is said".

There was a lax approach to the pairing of officers for interviews; officers less familiar with each other should be put together to reduce the risk of poor (or illegal) practice. A number of regular pairings of interviewing officers seems to have led to collaboration in falsifying evidence.

It was West Midlands Police policy to transfer the vast majority of documents to microfiche after two years and destroy the originals; the microfiche copies, however, were often unreadable. The practice made it impossible to ascertain if statements had been interfered with through ESDA scanning and analysis.

Low-level paperwork tasks were supervised by upper management, who were generally too involved in practical work (including investigations, distracting from leadership, policy setting and supervision). Management focused on paper-based processes, and was given little management training. Junior officers apparently had a practical veto on new recruits.

Management practice was sufficiently poor for misleading statements to be made by the squad to external authorities; it told the Court of Appeal that officers had been disciplined after interference with witness statements, but the changes did not include "incriminating admissions" (which was untrue). This led to the appeals of Horobin and Wilcox being turned down in 1988.

=== Confession evidence ===
The SCS often relied on confession evidence to the exclusion of other kinds of evidence, despite the fact that it is inherently unreliable. Sometimes this can be due to the presence of authority and the expectation of a confession; it can be due to stress factors in interviews. Given a certain level of stress, some interviewees will confess simply to bring the questioning to an end. A third group may come to believe in their guilt with time. False confessions are not the product of coercive techniques alone, but these factors can make confessions unsound.

Kaye noted five cases where a statement with a confession was presented to other suspects; self-incriminating reactions were noted, although not usually signed by the suspects. This evidence was then used in their convictions. For instance, Foran was noted as saying "What can I say? It's all there isn't it?" Boswell was recorded as saying "That fucking bastard, I'll kill him ... we all agreed to make our own statements if caught and I can't make one against my own will, can I?"

Several confessions were said by police officers to have been made in a squad car immediately after arrest. Suspects were sometimes brought to police stations far from the arrest, in contravention of PACE regulations. Squad-car interviews are an opportunity to interview suspects without a solicitor, and make it relatively easy for officers to claim that incriminating statements were made (including falsification of signed notes).

Signed confessions were shown from Dandy's case onwards to have been tampered with, due to forensic ESDA evidence. The original statements were generally destroyed, however, making it impossible to make this analysis in most cases. Courts later worked on the assumption that certain officers may have tampered with signed confessions on the basis of previous behaviour, making a conviction unsafe if it relied on this evidence.

Many confessions were recorded, but not admitted to, by defendants. The confessional statements were generally short and undetailed, even in the course of long interviews. Kaye notes in his examination that such confessions would be unusual; most of the suspects were criminals with several confessions, probably familiar with police procedure and the effect of such convictions if they were insisting on their innocence.

The confessions' phraseology was often similar, and hackneyed. Kaye records that many were variations of:

1. "That's a bit heavy"
2. "You're spot on"
3. "That bastard's really put me in it"
4. "You're putting a good case against me"

Kaye adds that the language of the statements was generally very similar, lacking differentiation in phraseology and colloquialisms from Birmingham or the Black Country and not reflecting the suspects' diverse backgrounds (who may have been Asian, Afro-Caribbean, or from different regions of Britain or Ireland). Only in the case of Afro-Caribbeans did he note any difference, where suspects would use the word "man" despite using the same language patterns in every other respect.

Other evidence for interference with statements is from their length. Where the content of the statements is claimed to have been added to, they frequently show implausibly-fast note-taking. Kaye calculates the transcription rate as around 30 words a minute, rather than a more-typical 20–23 words a minute. In John O'Brien's case, DC Shaw was asked in court to read back his notes from an interview marked as having taken 15 minutes; he took 20 minutes to read them back, and the case was dropped.

To make it difficult for interviewees to be found by lawyers or relatives, police used haphazard interview locations – often to the annoyance of other police, especially since they would be implicitly tolerating the denial of a suspect's right to a solicitor. Arrests often took place very early in the morning (standard police practice to ensure suspects are easily located), which would have made them disoriented during an interview. Irregular, long and early hours would also have affected police performance.

=== Denying suspects access to a solicitor ===
Kaye's analysis of 1980s case evidence found that no confession evidence was produced when a solicitor was present. He also found that access to solicitors was delayed in every case except for those where no request was made. The standard practice was apparently to interview suspects with the aim of obtaining a confession before allowing them a solicitor, which did not stop the confession evidence from being used in successful trials.

In some cases, suspects were forced to sign a statement that they had not requested a solicitor. George Lewis' custody sheet has a line marking the paper where his hand was clearly knocked to prevent him from striking out the statement saying that he had agreed not to have a solicitor present. Charles Campbell's solicitor obtained agreement from the police that no interview would take place without him, but Campbell's confession was apparently obtained in an interview less than fifteen minutes after the solicitor's departure.

=== Supergrass evidence ===
Supergrass evidence was used to corroborate evidence from alleged confessions. It did not appear with other evidence, according to Kaye, and cases relied on a combination of confessions and supergrass evidence.

Operation Cat, which included the conviction of Pendle and Derek Treadaway, relied heavily on evidence from supergrass Keith Morgan. Morgan had confessed to 20 offences and was sentenced to five years in return for the evidence he presented. He was not a reliable witness, and had alleged that a Merseyside police officer helped him plan robberies in return for payment. The allegation was dismissed after an investigation, but its existence and unreliability were unavailable to the defence of those he had accused.

Supergrass Albert McCabe implicated over 100 suspects since 1986, many of whom were prosecuted but whose cases later collapsed. He was prosecuted for a small number of offences after confessing to nearly 70, and was sentenced to six years in jail; the light sentence was part of a deal for giving evidence against others. He later wrote to the solicitors of those he had implicated that his evidence was given under duress. Once convicted, he refused to make any further statements for the police.

=== Violence, intimidation and torture ===
Allegations were made in the early 1980s that SCS officers placed plastic bags over the heads of suspects and covered their mouths to partially suffocate them and extract a confession. Kaye notes that no such incident occurred after 1983. Keith Twitchell underwent polygraph and "truth drug" tests to try to establish that this had happened, but the evidence was deemed inadmissible by the court.

In 1982–83, some of those convicted in Operation Cat made the same allegation. In Derek Treadaway's case, a Home Office pathologist gave evidence that abrasions around his mouth and bruising on his shoulders and chest were consistent with his account of being held down on a chair and "plastic-bagged" with his mouth covered. According to Kaye, allegations of violence declined significantly after 1986. A possible explanation for the decline in violence may include that it proved counter-productive; evidence of physical abuse could be recorded and presented in court, and psychological pressure in obtaining confessions could be just as effective.

There were many serious allegations of violence towards suspects in earlier SCS history, the best-known of which is the Birmingham Six. Derek Boswell made well-documented allegations in 1983, after he refused to make a statement. Boswell said that an unknown officer entered his cell, beat him up and told him to make a statement. He was later visited by a doctor, who recorded that he had blood stains on his T-shirt and trousers, blood clots in his nostrils and minor facial injuries consistent with his account of being hit in the face. The officer was never identified, although Boswell described him. One SCS officer was convicted in 1983 of beating up suspects on the evidence of a police cadet who was subsequently ostracised and resigned.

According to Kaye, complaints of threats increased as violence declined. Paul Fitzsimmons alleged that he was threatened in prison with rearrest on release unless he supported the police account of solicitors asking for bribes in the Ronnie Bolden case. DS McManus is alleged to have asked Fitzsimmons to claim that Bolden's solicitors had offered him a bribe to give evidence to help Bolden. (Note: McManus' claims about Bolden's solicitors collapsed due to clearly-fabricated evidence claiming the presence of two solicitors making bribes when one was, in fact, elsewhere.) Hassan Khan said that he was told during his journey back from arrest in North Wales that he would be beaten up and treated in the same way as the Birmingham Six, and was going to meet the person who dealt with them.

Eileen McCabe, sister of supergrass Albert, said that she was told to sign a confession. Her children were brought to the police station despite a previous agreement that they would stay with their grandmother, which made her extremely concerned about their treatment. She signed the confession, but it later came to light that she had difficulty reading and was unlikely to have understood its contents.

George Lewis alleged that he was threatened with a syringe, with police saying that they would give him injections (which he feared) if he did not sign. (Note: See § George Glen Lewis.) A witness in the case of PC Salt's murder alleged that she was intimidated and shouted at while being told to implicate the others involved; the main suspects were threatened with the murder charges if they did not confess to the robbery. (Note: See § Peter Gibbs, Mark Samuels and Tony Francis.)

=== Interference with evidence ===
In some cases, the SCS was accused of fabricating forensic evidence; Ronnie Bolden alleged that police rubbed his shoes and socks on a getaway car's carpet. In the cases of Robert Burston and others, police were said to have taken bin liners with their fingerprints and placed them in a post-office van. Keith Twitchell said that his hairs were planted as evidence, although this was not used in court.

During the PCA inquiry, seven police notebooks were found to be missing despite a requirement for them to be secured for seven years. Six arrest files of 658 from 1986 to August 1989 were missing. Kaye concludes that files going missing were "not uncommon" at the SCS. In the case of Gall, this included witness statements from the assault victim which described their assailant as different in appearance from Gall. Although this evidence re-appeared late in the court case, Gall was still convicted.

Michael Brommell, convicted of shotgun offences, complained about a fabricated confession. The interview notes had gone missing, however, making it impossible to identify the officers who had taken them. Two officers had viewed the file with the notes the day before they went missing. The officers were suspended when the SCS was disbanded, but were reinstated after no evidence was found that they had removed the notes.

Some cases relied on timing evidence which may have been altered. Michael Foran was said to have been arrested at 3:05 pm, just after an accomplice had arranged to meet him at the Hurst Street car park; Foran was logged as being in a cell by 3:12 pm, seven minutes later. Foran said he was arrested at 2:05 pm; an entry on his arrest sheet was crossed out, and the original document had been destroyed.

Timing evidence was also important in the Birmingham Six case, where forensic scientist Frank Skuse said that he examined the suspects and found them in good health at a time later than when they claimed they had been beaten up. Skuse had not taken notes, however, and a local chemist had been contacted by him at a time compatible with the defence's account.

== Failed prosecutions ==
=== Paul Dandy ===
Dandy's case was the first where ESDA evidence indicated that tampering with statements had taken place at the SCS, and opened up the possibility of others who had complained but not been believed to have their cases re-examined. Beginning in 1987, Dandy spent 18 months in prison awaiting trial for armed robbery. His defence presented forensic evidence from an ESDA examination indicating that his statement may have been tampered with, adding a one-line confession from Dandy. The case collapsed.

In 1993, Dandy was awarded £70,000 for his ten-month detention on remand. The police officers concerned were disciplined internally, and a report was given to the Crown Prosecution Service for possible further action.

=== Peter Gibbs, Mark Samuels and Tony Francis ===
Gibbs, Samuels and Francis were arrested and accused of being involved with the death of PC Tony Salt. Salt had been on duty with PC Mark Berry on 16 April 1989 in Small Heath, supposedly watching an illegal nightclub from a flat. According to Chris Mullin, recounting the events in Parliament, Salt probably died after a bout of heavy drinking on duty. Mullin said that Berry made four statements which increased the number and involvement in the incident from one to three Black men, one of whom reportedly had dreadlocks.

At a press conference the day after the death, Assistant Chief Constable Meffen "asserted that PC Salt had broken cover to check a suspect car and was set upon by a person or persons with martial arts skills, dragged into the alley and beaten to death". These details did not appear in statements by PC Mark Berry.

Gibbs, Samuels and Francis were arrested and interviewed. None had dreadlocks. Mullin said,

Mr. Gibbs ... describes how, once he had agreed to admit the thefts, he was carefully rehearsed in what he was to say once the recorder was switched on: "They were saying you can either do it peacefully or we can do it rough. I've been beaten up before in police stations and its not very nice. I wasn't prepared to go through all that again." Eventually, he agreed to admit to stealing PC Salt's wallet and a martial arts weapon called a cubiton that Salt was thought to be carrying.

According to Mullin, Samuels confessed to theft after being threatened with a murder charge; Francis was told that his family would be set up on drug charges if he did not confess to theft. Another witness was told to say that she had seen Francis hitting Salt. After securing their confessions to theft, all three were charged with murder.

The case against them quickly unravelled. A taxi driver witnessed Salt and Berry's drinking bout. Salt's wife said that she had found the cubiton that two of the suspects had confessed to stealing; Salt had taken no more than £5 that night, rather than the £30 said to have been stolen. The pathologist testified that although Salt had suffered a blow to the neck, he could not have then walked 120 feet from the party to the place where he died. Mullin said that the pathologist said that the "most likely explanation for his death was that, in his drunken state, Mr. Salt had fallen and hit his head on the bucket of a JCB digger parked nearby". The charges were dropped about a year after the events, despite the strength of evidence that they were innocent.

Salt was included on the roll of honour of officers who fell in the line of duty by the Police Federation. His name was included on the memorial in the West Midlands Police headquarters on Colmore Row and on the national police memorial in London.

== Overturned convictions ==
About 40 convictions failed during the 1980s, and a further 60 convictions were since overturned.

=== Birmingham Six ===
The Birmingham Six (Hugh Callaghan, Patrick Joseph Hill, Gerard Hunter, Richard McIlkenny, William Power and John Walker) were each sentenced to life imprisonment in 1975 after their false convictions for the 1974 Birmingham pub bombings. The convictions were declared unjust and unsatisfactory and were overturned by the Court of Appeal on 14 March 1991. The six were later awarded compensation ranging from £840,000 to £1.2 million.

=== Derek Treadaway, Michael Dunne, Ronald, Donald, and John Brown ===
Derek Treadaway, Michael Dunne, Ronald, Donald, and John Brown were arrested in Operation Cat and accused of membership in the Thursday Gang, named after a series of post-office robberies committed on Thursdays.

Treadaway was convicted in 1983 of three 1979 post-office robberies in Erdington and elsewhere. His conviction was overturned in 1996. He was a victim of "bagging": use of a plastic bag to suffocate interviewees to extract a confession.

Treadaway said at a civil trial for damages

that his confession was the false product of police impropriety in handcuffing him, placing a series of plastic bags over his head, so as to suffocate him, and forcing him in this condition to sign the written confession which had already been prepared for signature by police officers. There was evidence in the criminal trial that he had, by reason of this conduct, sustained petechial haemorrhages on his breast bone, about which a doctor gave evidence for the defence. He also complained in the course of the criminal trial that he had been deliberately denied access to a solicitor.

Other evidence at trial came from supergrass witnesses whose close involvement with corrupt officers made their testimony dubious. Several of the officers involved failed to appear at the appeal hearings.

=== George Glen Lewis ===
Lewis was arrested in January 1987 and convicted for two armed robberies and a burglary. His case was examined by the Yorkshire Police during their investigation.

Lewis told the Court of Appeal that be was "head-butted, punched and threatened with a syringe as he was questioned". He was forced to sign a confession, and was racially abused. ESDA evidence of the impressions left by his signatures indicated that he had probably signed blank sheets of paper which were used to write a statement in reverse order of that in which it was signed.

His conviction relied on the evidence of Detective Constable John Perkins and Detective Constable Peter Reynolds, who said that Lewis confessed while they were driving to the police station after his arrest. Perkins allegedly refused to allow Lewis a solicitor, threatened him, punched him, and demanded that he sign blank interview sheets. Lewis, who served 5 1/2 years in prison, was awarded £200,000 in compensation when his conviction was overturned.

=== Keith Twitchell, John Lyon McCloy and Patrick Irvine ===
Twitchell, McCloy and Irvine were arrested and convicted of involvement in a robbery in 1980. Twitchell testified that police "handcuffed him to the back legs of a chair he was sitting on and placed a plastic bag over his head, the material pressed to his nose and mouth."

His solicitor said at the trial that the "bag was removed from his head. The procedure was repeated a number of times, until finally his resolve was totally dissolved and he agreed to sign the statement put in front of him". A policeman allegedly said, "The bastard signs or he goes [out] feet first."

Twitchell complained about being "bagged" at the time, and was denied access to a solicitor until he signed a statement. All three had their convictions overturned.

=== Tarlochan Singh Gill and three others ===
Gill was convicted in 1984 of the murder of Wati Suri during a burglary, when she was beaten and strangled. Three other men allegedly involved were found guilty, but their convictions were overturned in 1985; Gill's conviction was upheld on the basis of a confession he reportedly made. He had spent ten years in prison when his conviction was overturned because his confession was extracted by Detective Sergeant James, whose evidence had been found unreliable in three other cases. Since Gill's conviction relied on that evidence, it was overturned.

=== John Joseph Cummiskey and Roy Meads ===
Cummiskey and Meads were convicted of armed robbery of £185,000 from a postal van. Both had their convictions overturned. Meads' conviction was quashed in January 1996. Cummiskey was jailed in 1985 and served eight years of a 15-year sentence. His 1987 request for permission to appeal was denied. Cummiskey's second request, in 1999, followed the review of other cases by the Criminal Cases Review Commission. His appeal was granted in 2003.

=== David Murphy and Patrick O'Toole ===
Murphy and O'Toole were convicted in 1978 of armed robbery at a British Leyland plant in Ward End. Murphy received an eight-year sentence, and O'Toole seven years. On appeal, the court noted that "Murphy says he was abused and intimidated by the police and he made no confessions. O'Toole says he was beaten up by police officers, especially DS Matthews, when he refused to make a statement admitting his part in the robbery." Their convictions were overturned in 2006, since the convictions "critically depended on the evidence of police officers, notably Hornby and Matthews, whose characters have subsequently been gravely tainted, especially that of Hornby".

=== Martin Foran ===
Foran was convicted of four counts of robbery in 1978, and was arrested and convicted in 1984 for a pub robbery. His convictions were overturned in 2013 and 2014. In 2013, reviewing the conviction for his 1984 offence, the courts found that police had ignored evidence that the "Martin" sought was a "kid"; squad statement-tampering was widespread at the time and evidence handled by DI Matthews, in particular, was unreliable. The defence had also been denied access to potentially-exculpatory evidence.

== Overturned Regional Crime Squad convictions ==
The No. 4 Regional Crime Squad was a sister squad of the SCS, operating over a wider area. Many of its officers were recruited to the SCS, including several who were later involved in misconduct.

=== Bridgewater Four ===
The Bridgewater Four were Patrick Molloy, James Robinson, and cousins Michael Hickey and Vincent Hickey. On 21 February 1997, the last in a number of appeals saw the men's convictions overturned, after the Court of Appeal ruled that the trial had been unfair; areas of evidence had been fabricated by police to persuade the now-deceased Molloy to confess. The appeal Judges noted that in light of Vincent Hickey's confessions of being present at the farm where Bridgewater was shot dead, "we consider that there remains evidence on which a reasonable jury properly directed could convict." The officers involved later worked at the SCS.

== See also ==
- List of failed and overturned convictions involving the West Midlands Serious Crime Squad
- List of miscarriage of justice cases in the United Kingdom
