= Birmingham Six =

Men falsely convicted for 1974 bombings

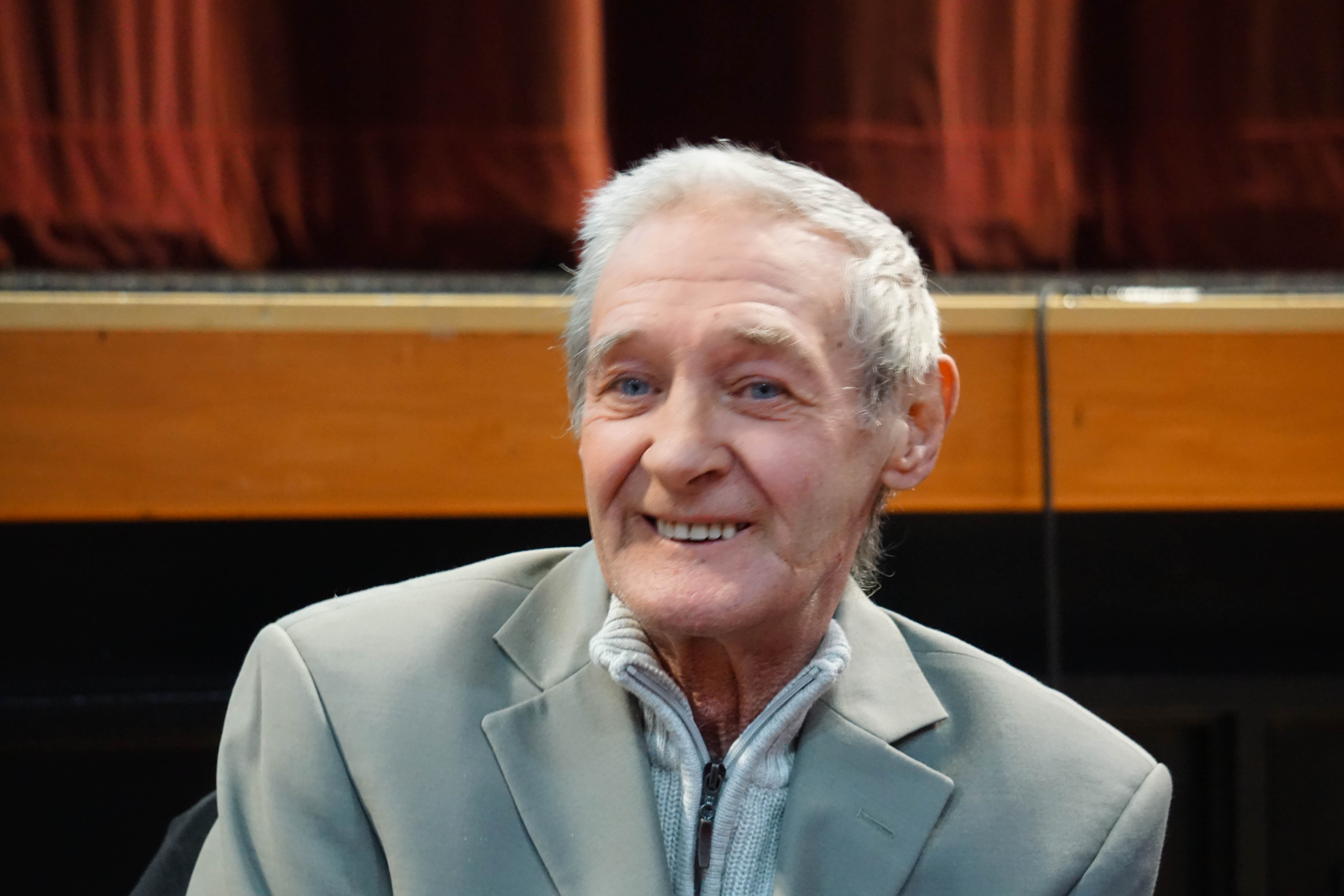
Paddy Hill in 2015

The Birmingham Six were six men from Northern Ireland who were each sentenced to life imprisonment in 1975 following their false convictions for the 1974 Birmingham pub bombings. Their convictions were declared unsafe and unsatisfactory and quashed by the Court of Appeal on 14 March 1991. The six men were later awarded financial compensation ranging from £840,000 to £1.2 million.

== Birmingham pub bombings ==
The Birmingham pub bombings took place on 21 November 1974 and were attributed to the Provisional Irish Republican Army (IRA). Improvised explosive devices were placed in two central Birmingham pubs: the Mulberry Bush at the foot of the Rotunda, and the Tavern in the Town – a basement pub in New Street. The resulting explosions, at 20:25 and 20:27, collectively were the deadliest attacks in the UK since World War II (until surpassed by the Denmark Place fire in 1980); 21 people were killed (ten at the Mulberry Bush and eleven at the Tavern in the Town) and 182 people were injured.

=== Arrests and questioning ===
Six men were arrested: Hugh Callaghan (1930–2023), Patrick Joseph Hill (1944–2024), Gerard Hunter, Richard McIlkenny (1933–2006), William Power and John Walker. Five were Belfast-born, while John Walker was born in Derry. All six had lived in Birmingham since the 1960s. All the men except for Callaghan had left the city early on the evening of 21 November from New Street Station, shortly before the explosions. They were travelling to Belfast to attend the funeral of James McDade, an IRA member whom they all knew. McDade had accidentally killed himself on 14 November when his bomb detonated prematurely while he was planting it at a telephone exchange in Coventry.

When they reached Heysham, Lancashire, they and others were subject to a Special Branch stop and search. The men did not tell the police of the true purpose of their visit to Belfast, a fact that was later held against them. While the search was in progress the police were informed of the Birmingham bombings. The men agreed to be taken to Morecambe, Lancashire, police station for forensic tests. On the morning of 22 November, after the forensic tests and questioning by the Morecambe police, the men were transferred to the custody of West Midlands Serious Crime Squad police unit. Callaghan was taken into custody on the evening of 22 November.

While the men were in the custody of the West Midlands Police they were allegedly deprived of food and sleep and were sometimes interrogated for as much as 12 hours without a break. Threats were made against them and they suffered abuse: punches, dogs being let loose within a foot of them, and a mock execution. William Power said that officers from Birmingham police Criminal Investigation Department assaulted him. Richard McIlkenny's daughter said, "When they (the family) saw him the next day, he had been so badly beaten he was unrecognisable".

Power confessed while in Morecambe while Callaghan, Walker and McIlkenny confessed at Queens Road in Aston, Birmingham.

=== Trial ===
On 12 May 1975, the six men were charged with murder. Three other men, James Kelly, Mick Murray and Michael Sheehan, were charged with conspiracy.

The trial began on 9 June 1975 at the Crown Court sitting at Lancaster Castle, before Mr Justice Bridge and a jury. After legal arguments the statements made in November were deemed admissible as evidence. The unreliability of these statements was later established. Thomas Watt provided circumstantial evidence about John Walker's association with Provisional IRA members.

Forensic scientist Frank Skuse used positive Griess test results to claim that Hill and Power had handled explosives. Callaghan, Hunter, McIlkenny and Walker all had tested negative. GCMS tests at a later date were negative for Power and contradicted the initial results for Hill. Skuse's claim that he was 99% certain that Power and Hill had explosives traces on their hands was opposed by defence expert Hugh Kenneth Black of the Royal Institute of Chemistry, the former HM Chief Inspector of Explosives, Home Office. Skuse's evidence was clearly preferred by Bridge. The jury found the six men guilty of murder. On 15 August 1975, they were each sentenced to 21 life sentences.

=== Criminal charges against prison officers and civil actions against police ===
On 28 November 1975, the men appeared in court for the second time after they had been remanded into custody at HM Prison Winson Green. All showed bruising and other signs of ill-treatment. Fourteen prison officers were charged with assault in June 1975, but were all acquitted at a trial presided over by Mr Justice Swanwick. The Six brought a civil claim for damages against the West Midlands Police in 1977, which was struck out on 17 January 1980 by the Court of Appeal (Civil Division), constituted by the Master of the Rolls, Lord Denning, Lord Justice Goff, and Sir George Baker, under the principle of estoppel. Denning remarked that he was disallowing the appeal in part because the allegations against the police were so serious that he could not believe them:

Just consider the course of events if this action is allowed to proceed to trial. If the six men fail, it will mean that much time and money will have been expended by many people for no good purpose. If the six men win, it will mean that the police were guilty of perjury, that they were guilty of violence and threats, that the confessions were involuntary and were improperly admitted in evidence and that the convictions were erroneous. That would mean that the Home Secretary would either have to recommend they be pardoned or he would have to remit the case to the Court of Appeal. This is such an appalling vista that every sensible person in the land would say: It cannot be right that these actions should go any further.

=== Appeals ===
In March 1976 their first application for leave to appeal was dismissed by the Court of Appeal, presided over by Lord Widgery CJ. Journalist Chris Mullin investigated the case for Granada TV's World in Action series. In 1985, the first of several World in Action programmes casting doubt on the men's convictions was broadcast. In 1986, Mullin's book, Error of Judgment: The Truth About the Birmingham Pub Bombings, set out a detailed case supporting the men's claims that they were innocent. It included his claim to have met the four men who were actually responsible for the bombings.

The Home Secretary, Douglas Hurd, referred the case back to the Court of Appeal. In January 1988, after a six-week hearing (at that time the longest criminal appeal hearing ever held), the convictions were ruled to be safe and satisfactory. The Court of Appeal, presided over by the Lord Chief Justice Lord Lane, dismissed the appeals. Over the next three years, newspaper articles, television documentaries and books brought forward new evidence to question the safety of the convictions. Irish Taoiseach Charles Haughey requested the case be reopened with Prime Minister of the United Kingdom Margaret Thatcher in a December 1989 meeting to no avail.

Their second full appeal, in 1991, was allowed. Hunter was represented by Lord Gifford QC, the others by Michael Mansfield QC. The Crown decided not to resist the appeals on the basis of new evidence of police fabrication and suppression of evidence, the successful attacks on both the confessions, and the 1975 forensic evidence. The Court of Appeal, constituted by Lord Justices Lloyd, Mustill and Farquharson, stated that "in the light of the fresh scientific evidence, which at least throws grave doubt on Skuse's evidence, if it does not destroy it altogether, these convictions are both unsafe and unsatisfactory." On 14 March 1991 the six walked free.

In 2001, a decade after their release, the six men were awarded compensation ranging from £840,000 to £1.2 million.

=== Later lives and deaths ===
Richard McIlkenny died of cancer on 21 May 2006, aged 73. He had returned to Ireland shortly after he was freed from prison and died in hospital with his family at his bedside. He was buried on 24 May in Celbridge, County Kildare. The other members of the Birmingham Six were present at his wake and funeral.

Hugh Callaghan died on 27 May 2023, aged 93.

Patrick Hill died in his home in Ayrshire, on 30 December 2024, aged 80.

As of 2011, of the three surviving members of the Birmingham Six, Gerard Hunter resided in Portugal, John Walker in Donegal and William Power in London.

=== Consequences ===
The success of the appeals and other miscarriages of justice caused the Home Secretary to set up a Royal Commission on Criminal Justice in 1991. The commission reported in 1993 and led to the Criminal Appeal Act 1995 which established the Criminal Cases Review Commission in 1997. Superintendent George Reade and two other police officers were charged with perjury and conspiracy to pervert the course of justice but were never prosecuted. During the inquest into the bombings in 2016, Hill stated that he knew the identities of three of the bombers who were still "free men" in Ireland.

== Granada Television productions ==
On 28 March 1990, ITV broadcast the Granada Television docudrama, Who Bombed Birmingham?, which re-enacted the bombings and subsequent key events in Chris Mullin's campaign. Written by Rob Ritchie and directed by Mike Beckham, it starred John Hurt as Mullin, Martin Shaw as World in Action producer Ian McBride, Ciarán Hinds as Richard McIlkenny, one of the Six, and Patrick Malahide as Michael Mansfield QC. It was repackaged for export as The Investigation – Inside a Terrorist Bombing, and first shown on American television on 22 April 1990. Granada's BAFTA-nominated follow-up documentary after the release of the six men, World in Action Special: The Birmingham Six – Their Own Story, was telecast on 18 March 1991. It was released on DVD in 2007 in Network's first volume of World in Action productions.

In 1994, Frank Skuse brought libel proceedings against Granada, contending that World in Action had falsely portrayed him as negligent. His counsel asserted in the High Court that scientific tests performed in 1992, after the Crown's substantive concession of the accused men's third appeal, showed that traces of nitroglycerine were detected on swabs taken after the bombings from the hands of Hunter and Hill, and on rail tickets handled by McIlkenny and Power. Granada maintained that there were never any traces of explosives on the six men. Skuse abandoned the action later that year.

== Freedom of speech ==
In December 1987, the Court of Appeal granted an injunction which prevented Channel 4 from re-enacting portions of a hearing in the litigation, as it was "likely to undermine public confidence in the administration of justice" if shown during the appeal, in violation of the Contempt of Court Act 1981. In their book The Three Pillars of Liberty (1996) Keir Starmer, Francesca Klug, and Stuart Weir said the decision had had a "chilling effect" on other news and current affairs programmes.

In January 1988 after their first appeal failed, The Sun published an article with the headline "Loony MP Backs Bomb Gang" (a reference to Mullin, who had won a seat in 1987) and an editorial said, "If The Sun had its way, we would have been tempted to string 'em up years ago".

In 1993 and 1994, the Birmingham Six received an undisclosed amount from both The Sunday Telegraph and The Sun in an action for libel for the newspapers' reporting of police statements. The New York Times reported in 1997 that the Six had brought libel actions against publications for reporting slurs against them, and that a libel law that usually favours plaintiffs was sending a chill through the British press. They sued the Conservative MP David Evans in March 1997 for saying that they were guilty of killing hundreds of people before they were caught. Evans apologised 16 months later. He paid both damages and costs and promised never to repeat the allegation.

=== Attempt to force journalist to reveal sources ===
During his investigation, which proved crucial in establishing the innocence of the Six, Mullin located one of the actual bombers and persuaded him to provide information which helped the men falsely convicted. Mullin promised that he would never reveal his source. At the time the police were not interested, as they believed that they had already arrested the culprits.

However, in 2018 the West Midlands police reopened the investigation. In 2019 a witness at the inquest testified that the real bombers were Mick Murray, James Francis Gavin, Seamus McLoughlin and Michael Hayes. Mullin confirmed that Murray, Gavin and Hayes were three of the four bombers he had revealed in his book, but he refused to identify the fourth bomber who he called the "young Planter" who was still alive. Mullin cooperated with the investigation as far as he felt was possible, for example providing notes of interviews with Murray and a redacted copy of notes of other interviews. But Mullin refused to name other people interviewed. The West Midlands police applied for an order under the Terrorism Act 2000 to compel Mullin to reveal his sources; he refused, later saying that source protection is a cornerstone of the free press in a democracy.

In March 2022 Judge Lucraft ruled that it was not in the public interest to oblige Mullin to identify the living perpetrator. Mullin's legal team later said, hailing the ruling, that the right of a journalist to protect their sources was fundamental to a free press in a democracy.

== See also ==
- Guildford Four and Maguire Seven, two sets of people falsely convicted of the Guildford pub bombings which were carried out by the Provisional IRA's Balcombe Street Gang in 1974.
- Reykjavik Six, a gang of youths falsely accused of the murder of two disappeared people in Iceland in 1974.
- Maamtrasna trial
- "Streets of Sorrow/Birmingham Six", a song by The Pogues in support of the Birmingham Six and Guildford Four
- List of miscarriage of justice cases
