= Birmingham pub bombings =

1974 IRA attack in England

- Part of the Troubles
- Aftermath of the explosion in the Mulberry Bush public house, which killed ten people
- Location: The Mulberry Bush and Tavern in the Town public houses, Birmingham City Centre; and Barclays Bank, Edgbaston, Birmingham, England
- Date: 21 November 1974; 51 years ago 20:17 (Mulberry Bush); 20:27 (Tavern in the Town) (GMT)
- Attack type: Bombing, massacre, Irish Republican attack
- Weapon: Time bombs
- Deaths: 21
- Injuries: 182
- Perpetrator: Provisional IRA

On 21 November 1974, bombs exploded in two pubs in Birmingham, England, killing 21 people and injuring 182 others.

The Provisional IRA never officially admitted responsibility for the bombings, although a former senior officer of the organisation confessed to their involvement in 2014. In 2017, one of the alleged perpetrators, Michael Hayes, also claimed that the intention of the bombings had not been to harm civilians, and that their deaths had been caused by an unintentional delay in delivering an advance telephone warning to security services.

Six Irishmen were arrested within hours of the blasts and, in 1975, sentenced to life imprisonment for the bombings. The men—who became known as the Birmingham Six—maintained their innocence and insisted police had coerced them into signing false confessions through severe physical and psychological abuse. After 16 years in prison, and a lengthy campaign, their convictions were declared unsafe and unsatisfactory, and quashed by the Court of Appeal in 1991. The episode is seen as one of the worst miscarriages of justice in British legal history.

The Birmingham pub bombings were one of the deadliest acts of the Troubles and the deadliest act of terrorism to occur in England between the Second World War and the 2005 London bombings.

== Background ==
In 1973, the Provisional IRA extended its campaign to England, attacking military and symbolically important targets to both increase pressure on the British government, via popular British opinion, to withdraw from Northern Ireland, and to maintain morale amongst their supporters. By 1974, mainland Britain saw an average of one attack—successful or otherwise—every three days. These attacks included five explosions which had occurred in Birmingham on 14 July, one of which had occurred at the Rotunda. Prior to any attack upon civilian targets, a code of conduct was followed in which the attacker or attackers would send an anonymous telephone warning to police, with the caller reciting a confidential code word known only to the Provisional IRA and to police, to indicate the authenticity of the threat.

On 14 November, James McDade, a 28-year-old UK-based member of the Provisional IRA, was killed in a premature explosion as he attempted to plant a bomb at a telephone exchange and postal sorting office in Coventry. Another man, Raymond McLaughlin, was arrested near the scene; he was charged with unlawfully killing McDade and causing an explosion. The republican movement in England had planned to bury McDade in Birmingham, with a paramilitary guard of honour. These plans were altered after the British Home Secretary vowed that such a funeral, and any associated sympathy marches, would be prevented. Councils in the West Midlands chose to ban any processions linked to the death of McDade under the Public Order Act 1936.

McDade's body was driven to Birmingham Airport and flown to Ireland on the afternoon of 21 November 1974. Initially, his body had been scheduled to be flown to Belfast Airport; however, upon learning that staff at the airport had refused to handle the coffin, McDade's body was instead flown to Dublin. All police leave was cancelled on this date, with an extra 1,300 officers drafted into Birmingham to quell any unrest as the hearse carrying McDade's coffin was driven to the airport. McDade's body was buried in Milltown Cemetery in Belfast on 23 November. According to a senior Provisional IRA figure, tensions within the Birmingham IRA unit were "running high" over the disrupted funeral arrangements for James McDade.

== The bombings ==
On the early evening of 21 November, at least three bombs connected to timing devices were planted inside two public houses and outside a bank located in and around central Birmingham. It is unknown precisely when these bombs were planted; if official IRA protocol of preceding attacks upon non-military installations with a 30-minute advance warning to security services was followed, and subsequent eyewitness accounts are accurate, the bombs would have been planted at these locations after 19:30 and before 19:47.

According to testimony delivered at the 1975 trial of the Birmingham Six, the bomb planted inside the Mulberry Bush was concealed inside either a duffel bag or briefcase, whereas the bomb planted inside the Tavern in the Town was concealed inside a briefcase or duffel bag (possibly concealed within a large, sealed plastic bag) and Christmas cracker boxes. The remnants of two alarm clocks recovered from the site of each explosion leaves the possibility that two bombs had been planted at each public house; the explosion crater at each location indicates that if two bombs had been planted at each public house, they would each have been placed in the same location and likely the same container.

Reportedly, those who planted these bombs then walked to a preselected phone box to telephone the advance warning to security services; however, the phone box had been vandalised, forcing the caller to find an alternative phone box and thus shortening the amount of time police had to clear the locations.

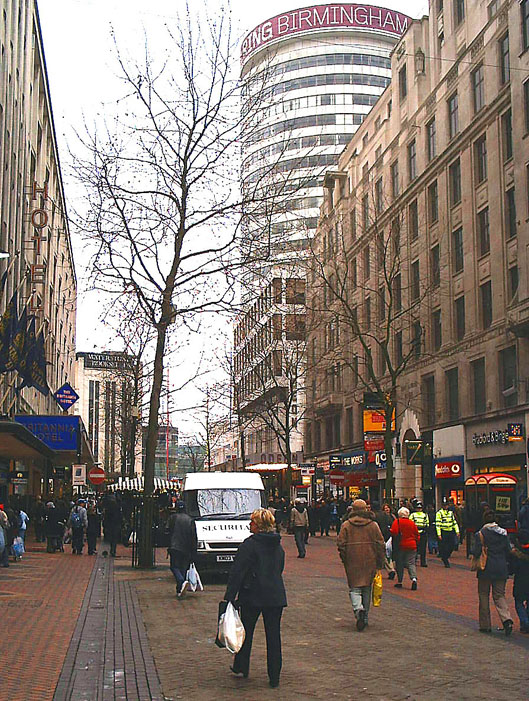
New Street in central Birmingham facing the cylindrical Rotunda. On the right are the sign and doorway of The Yard of Ale; the premises formerly occupied by the Tavern in the Town.

At 20:11, an unknown man with a distinct Irish accent telephoned the Birmingham Post newspaper stating "There is a bomb planted in the Rotunda and there is a bomb in New Street at the tax office. This is Double X", before terminating the call. ("Double X" was an IRA code word given to authenticate any warning call.) A similar warning was also sent to the Birmingham Evening Mail newspaper, with the anonymous caller(s) again giving the code word, but again failing to name the public houses in which the bombs had been planted.

=== Mulberry Bush ===
The Rotunda is a 25-storey office block, built in the 1960s, that housed the Mulberry Bush pub on its lower two floors. Within minutes of the warning, police arrived and began checking the upper floors of the Rotunda, but they did not have sufficient time to clear the crowded pub at street level. At 20:17, six minutes after the first telephone warning had been delivered to the Birmingham Post, the bomb—which had been concealed inside either a duffel bag or briefcase located close to the rear entrance to the premises—exploded, devastating the pub. The explosion blew a 40-inch (100 cm) crater in the concrete floor, collapsing part of the roof and trapping many casualties beneath girders and concrete blocks. Many buildings near the Rotunda were also damaged, and pedestrians in the street were struck by flying glass from shattered windows. Several of the victims died at the scene, including two youths who had been walking past the premises at the moment of the explosion.

Ten people were killed in this explosion and dozens were injured, including many who lost limbs. Several casualties had been impaled by sections of wooden furniture; others had their clothes burned from their bodies. A paramedic called to the scene of this explosion later described the carnage as being reminiscent of a slaughterhouse; one fireman said that, upon seeing a writhing, "screaming torso", he had begged police to allow a television crew inside the premises to film the dead and dying at the scene, in the hope the IRA would see the consequences of their actions; however, the police refused this request, fearing the reprisals would be extreme.

One of those injured was 21-year-old Maureen Carlin, who had such extensive shrapnel wounds to her stomach and bowel she told her fiancé, Ian Lord (himself badly wounded in the explosion): "If I die, just remember I love you". Carlin was given the last rites, with surgeons initially doubtful she would live, although she recovered from her injuries.

=== Tavern in the Town ===
The Tavern in the Town was a basement pub on New Street located a short distance from the Rotunda and directly beneath the New Street Tax Office. Patrons there had heard the explosion at the Mulberry Bush, but did not believe that the sound (described by one survivor as a "muffled thump") was an explosion.

Police had begun attempting to clear the Tavern in the Town when, at 20:27, a second bomb exploded there. The blast was so powerful that several victims were blown through a brick wall. Their remains were wedged between the rubble and live underground electric cables that supplied the city centre. One of the first police officers on the scene later testified that the scene which greeted his eyes was "absolutely dreadful", with several of the dead stacked upon one another, others strewn about the ruined pub, and several screaming survivors staggering aimlessly amongst the debris, rubble, and severed limbs. A survivor said the sound of the explosion was replaced by a "deafening silence" and the smell of burnt flesh.

Rescue efforts at the Tavern in the Town were initially hampered as the bomb had been placed at the base of a set of stairs descending from the street which had been destroyed in the explosion, and the premises had been accessible solely via this entrance. The victims whose bodies had been blown through a brick wall and wedged between the rubble and underground electric cables took up to three hours to recover, as recovery operations were delayed until the power could be isolated. A passing West Midlands bus was also destroyed in the blast.

This bomb killed nine people outright, and injured everyone in the pub—many severely; two later died of their injuries: 28-year-old barman Thomas Chaytor on 28 November, and 34-year-old James Craig on 10 December. After the second explosion, police evacuated all pubs and businesses in Birmingham city centre and commandeered all available rooms in the nearby City Centre Hotel as an impromptu first-aid post. All bus services into the city centre were halted, and taxi drivers were encouraged to transport those lightly injured in the explosions to hospital. Prior to the arrival of ambulances, rescue workers removed critically injured casualties from each scene upon makeshift stretchers constructed from devices such as tabletops and wooden planks. These severely injured casualties would be placed on the pavement and given first aid prior to the arrival of ambulance services.

=== Hagley Road ===
At 21:15, a third bomb, concealed inside two plastic bags, was found in the doorway of a Barclays Bank on Hagley Road, approximately two miles from the site of the first two explosions. This device consisted of 13.5 pounds (6.1 kg) of Frangex connected to a timer, and was set to detonate at 23:00. The detonator to this device activated when a policeman prodded the bags with his truncheon, but the bomb did not explode. The device was destroyed in a controlled explosion early the following morning.

=== Fatalities ===
Altogether, 21 people were killed and 182 injured in the Birmingham pub bombings, making them the deadliest terrorist attack in mainland Britain during the Troubles. Residents of Birmingham have referred to the Birmingham pub bombings as the "darkest day" in their city's history.

Many of those wounded were left permanently disabled, including one young man who lost both legs, and a young woman who was blinded by shrapnel. The majority of the dead and wounded were between the ages of 17 and 30, including a young couple on their first date, a young woman whose boyfriend had intended to propose to her on the evening of her death, and two Irishmen, brothers Desmond and Eugene Reilly (aged 21 and 23 respectively). The widow of Desmond Reilly gave birth to his first child four months after his death. One of the victims, 18-year-old Maxine Hambleton, had only entered the Tavern in the Town to hand out tickets to friends for her housewarming party. She was killed seconds after entering the pub and had been standing directly beside the bomb when it exploded, killing her instantly. Her friend, 17-year-old Jane Davis, was one of two 17-year-olds killed in the bombings, and had entered the Tavern in the Town to view holiday photographs she had developed that afternoon.

== Initial reaction ==
The bombings stoked considerable anti-Irish sentiment in Birmingham, which then had an Irish community of 100,000. Irish people were ostracised from public places and subjected to physical assaults, verbal abuse and death threats. Both in Birmingham and across England, Irish homes, pubs, businesses and community centres were attacked, in some cases with firebombs. Staff at thirty factories across the Midlands went on strike in protest at the bombings, while workers at airports across England refused to handle flights bound for Ireland. Bridget Reilly, the mother of the two Irish brothers killed in the Tavern in the Town explosion, was herself refused service in local shops.

The bombings were immediately blamed on the IRA, despite the organisation not having claimed responsibility. Due to anger against Irish people in Birmingham after the bombings, the IRA's Army Council placed the city "strictly off-limits" to IRA active service units. In Northern Ireland, loyalist paramilitaries launched a wave of revenge attacks on Irish Catholics: within two days of the bombings, five Catholic civilians had been shot dead by loyalists.

=== First IRA statement ===
Two days after the bombings, the Provisional IRA issued a statement in which they denied any responsibility. This statement stressed that a detailed internal investigation was underway to determine the possibility of any rogue members' involvement, although the Provisional IRA emphasised that the methodology of the attacks contradicted the official IRA code of conduct when attacking non-military targets, whereby adequate warnings would be sent to security services to ensure the safety of civilians. The president of Sinn Féin, Ruairí Ó Brádaigh, conducted an internal investigation which, he stated, confirmed the bombings had not been sanctioned by the IRA leadership.

The Provisional IRA never officially admitted responsibility for the Birmingham pub bombings.

=== Prevention of Terrorism Act ===
Within four days of the bombings, Roy Jenkins, the Home Secretary, announced that the Irish Republican Army was to be proscribed within the UK. Two days later, on 27 November, Jenkins introduced the Prevention of Terrorism Act 1974, which granted the police in mainland Britain the right to arrest, detain, and question people for up to seven days if they were suspected of the commission or preparation of an act of terrorism on the British mainland, and their subsequent deportation to either Northern Ireland or the Republic of Ireland if culpability was proven. Jenkins later described the measures of this Act as being "draconian measures unprecedented in peacetime".

In response to public pressure, a separate debate within the House of Commons as to whether those convicted of terrorist offences should face the death penalty was held on 11 December 1974. This motion drew the support of more than 200 MPs, although the majority of those in Parliament voted against the restoration of the death penalty, reportedly in part due to fear that such a move could have encouraged the IRA to use children to plant bombs.

The Prevention of Terrorism Act became law on 29 November, and remained in force until superseded by the Terrorism Act in July 2000.

=== Forensic analysis ===
An analysis of the remnants of the bombs placed at the Mulberry Bush and the Tavern in the Town revealed these devices had been constructed in a similar manner to the bomb placed at Hagley Road. Each bomb placed inside the public houses would have weighed between 25 and 30 lbs, and had contained numerous shards of metal. The forensic analyst was able to state that the construction of these devices was very similar to that of seven other bombs and incendiary devices discovered at various locations in Birmingham, Coventry and Wolverhampton in the 16 days prior to the Birmingham pub bombings, and that the explosive material used to construct the bomb discovered at Hagley Road was of a brand solely manufactured in the Republic of Ireland which could not legally be imported into Britain. All these factors led the explosives expert to conclude that all three bombs had been manufactured by the same people, and that it was likely that whoever had constructed these bombs had also committed previous IRA attacks. This conclusion was further supported by the methodology of the attacks, and the official IRA code word given to the Birmingham Evening Mail and Birmingham Post newspapers minutes before the explosions.

== The Birmingham Six ==
=== Arrest ===
At 19:55 on 21 November (scarcely 20 minutes before the first bomb had exploded), five men—Patrick Hill, Gerard Hunter, Richard McIlkenny, William Power and John Walker—had boarded a train at Birmingham New Street station. These men—who, alongside Hugh Callaghan, would become known as the "Birmingham Six"—were originally from Northern Ireland. Five of the Birmingham Six hailed from Belfast, whereas John Walker had lived in Derry until age 16. All six men had lived in Birmingham for between 11 and 27 years respectively and, although they had known James McDade and/or his family to varying degrees, each man was adamant they had not known of his IRA affiliations.

When the bombs exploded, the booking clerk from whom the men had purchased tickets informed police that a man with an Irish accent, dressed in a dust-covered purple suit, had purchased a ticket to travel to the coastal village of Heysham, en route to Belfast. The man had then run onto the train. A spot check on ticket sales that evening revealed that four further tickets to travel to Belfast via Heysham had also been issued. Within three hours of the bombings, each man had been detained at Heysham Port and taken to Morecambe police station to undergo forensic tests to eliminate them as suspects in the bombings. Each man expressed their willingness to assist in these inquiries, having informed the officers of a half-truth as to the reason they had been travelling to Belfast: that they intended to visit their families, although they also intended to attend McDade's funeral.

Between 03:00 and 06:10 the following morning, forensic scientist Frank Skuse conducted a series of Griess tests upon the hands, fingernails and belongings of the five men arrested at Heysham Port, to determine whether any of the men had handled the explosive nitroglycerine. He concluded with a 99% degree of certainty that both Patrick Hill and William Power had handled explosives, and remained uncertain as to the test results conducted on John Walker, whose right hand had tested positive, but whose left hand had tested negative. The test results upon Hunter and McIlkenny had been negative.

Each man was ordered to change his clothes. A search of Walker's possessions revealed several mass cards printed in reference to the upcoming funeral of James McDade. Upon discovering these mass cards, two officers led Walker into an adjacent room, where he was repeatedly punched, kicked and, later, burned with a lit cigarette by three officers as his arms were restrained by the two policemen who had escorted him into the room. Similar assaults were committed upon Power, Hunter, Hill and, to a lesser degree, McIlkenny; the officers who administered these beatings took great care to avoid marking the men's faces.

At 12:55 on the afternoon of 22 November, while detained at Morecambe police station, William Power signed a confession admitting his involvement in the Birmingham pub bombings. This confession was extracted after Power had been subjected to extreme physical and psychological abuse, which included repeated kicking in the stomach, head and legs, dragging by the hair, and the stretching of his scrotum.

==== False confessions ====
The five men were transferred to the custody of the West Midlands Serious Crime Squad on the afternoon of 22 November. At 22:45 that evening, Hugh Callaghan was arrested at his home in Birmingham and driven to Sutton Coldfield police station, where he was briefly questioned before being detained in a cell overnight, but intentionally denied sleep. The same evening Callaghan was arrested, the homes of all six men were extensively—and unsuccessfully—searched for explosives and explosive material.

Following their transfer to the custody of the West Midlands Crime Squad, three other members of the Birmingham Six (Callaghan, McIlkenny and Walker) signed false confessions on 23 November. In these three further false statements obtained by the West Midlands Crime Squad, Callaghan, McIlkenny and Walker each falsely claimed to be members of the IRA; to have conspired with McDade to cause explosions prior to his death; and to have planted the bombs at the Mulberry Bush and the Tavern in the Town public houses. As had been the case with William Power while detained at Morecambe police station, the three men later claimed that, before and during their transfer to Birmingham, officers had coerced them into signing these confessions through severe physical, psychological and emotional abuse. This mistreatment included beatings, deprivation of food and sleep, being subject to mock executions, intimidation, being burned with lit cigarettes, and being forced to stand or squat in various stress positions. In addition, each man had heard threats directed against their families. Hill and Hunter both claimed they had been subject to the same mistreatment, and although both men had refused to sign false confessions, police later claimed that both men had verbally confessed their guilt. On 24 November, each man was initially charged with the murder of 17-year-old Jane Davis, who had been killed in the Tavern in the Town explosion. All six were remanded in custody at Winson Green Prison, and they were only assigned solicitors the following day.

Inside Winson Green Prison, all six men were subject to the same mistreatment at the hands of prison officers as they had endured at the hands of police, with one of the men losing four teeth in one assault. At a further court hearing on 28 November, each man was observed to have extensive facial injuries; an examination by a prison doctor revealed each man had received extensive injuries not only to their faces, but across their bodies. (Following an independent investigation into this mistreatment, the British Director of Public Prosecutions recommended that 14 prison warders be charged with assault. These men were suspended from duty in December 1975; all 14 were found not guilty of 90 separate charges of misconduct and assault on 15 July 1976.)

==== Second IRA statement ====
Dáithí Ó Conaill, a member of the Provisional IRA's Army Council, had four days before the Birmingham pub bombings issued a statement declaring that the "consequences of war" would incessantly be felt not only in Northern Ireland, but on the British mainland, until the British government announced their intentions to "disengage from Ireland". One week after the Birmingham Six had been charged with the murder of Jane Davis, Ó Conaill issued a further statement emphasising that none of the Birmingham Six had ever been members of the IRA. Ó Conaill further stated:

If IRA members had carried-out such attacks, they would be court-martialled and could face the death penalty. The IRA has clear guidelines for waging its war. Any attack on non-military installations must be preceded by a 30-minute warning so that no innocent civilians are endangered.

==== Committal hearing ====
At a committal hearing in May 1975, each man was formally charged with 21 counts of murder, with additional charges of conspiracy to cause explosions. Due to the wave of public outrage towards the perpetrators of the Birmingham pub bombings within the Midlands, Mr Justice Bridge conceded to defence motions to move the trial away from the Midlands, and the trial was set to be heard within the Shire Hall and Crown Court of Lancaster Castle the following month. Also to stand trial with the Birmingham Six were three men: Mick Murray (a known member of the Provisional IRA who had previously been convicted of a separate charge of conspiracy to cause explosions), James Francis Gavin (a.k.a. James Kelly, who had likewise been tried alongside the Birmingham Six and convicted of the possession of explosives), who had allegedly constructed each of the bombs, and Michael Sheehan. Murray was also charged with conspiracy to cause explosions across the Midlands, with Kelly and Sheehan charged with possession of explosives.

Prior to the trial, defence lawyers for the Birmingham Six applied for their clients to be tried separately from Sheehan, Kelly and, particularly, Murray, stating that their clients' presumptions of innocence and denials of association with the IRA would be tainted if they were tried alongside an admitted member of the Provisional IRA, who had been convicted of causing explosions. This application was rejected by Mr Justice Bridge, who was to preside over the trial.

=== Trial ===
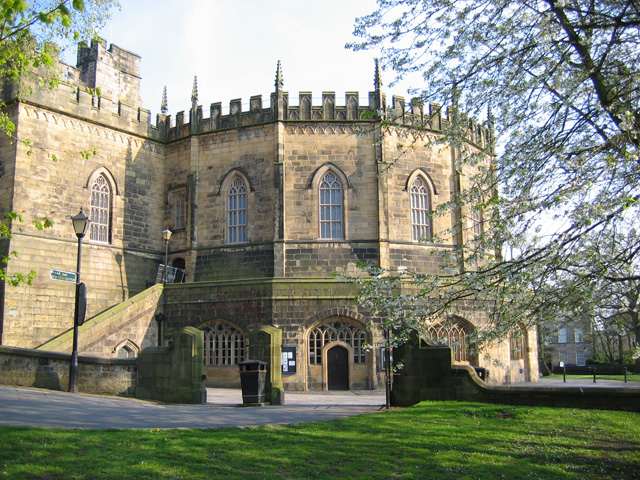
The Shire Hall and Crown Court of Lancaster Castle. The Birmingham Six were tried at this location in 1975.

On 9 June 1975, the Birmingham Six stood trial at Lancaster Crown Court before Mr Justice Bridge. Each man was charged with 21 counts of murder and conspiring with the deceased James McDade to cause explosions across the Midlands between August and November 1974. Murray, Kelly and Sheehan were also charged with conspiracy to cause explosions across the Midlands, with Kelly and Sheehan facing the additional charges of possession of explosives.

All six men emphatically maintained their innocence, stating they had never been members of the IRA; that they had not known James McDade had been a member of the IRA until his death; and reiterating their earlier claims of having been subject to intense physical and psychological abuse upon their arrest. Sheehan and Kelly also denied the charges brought against them, with Murray simply refusing to acknowledge or speak throughout the entire proceedings. (No direct evidence was offered to link Murray, Sheehan or Kelly with the Birmingham pub bombings. Nonetheless, the Crown alleged they were part of the same IRA unit as the Birmingham Six, and contended the Birmingham pub bombs may have been planted "in some illogical way" to avenge or commemorate the death of James McDade.)

The primary evidence presented against the Birmingham Six linking them to the Birmingham pub bombings were their written confessions, the Griess tests conducted by Frank Skuse at Morecambe police station, and circumstantial evidence indicative of Irish republicanism sympathies which would be supported by character witnesses called to testify on behalf of the prosecution.

Skuse testified as to his conducting Griess tests upon the hands of the six men following their arrest, stating as to his being 99% certain that both Hill and Power had handled explosive materials, and to a possibility Walker may also have done so. Skuse conceded that he could not rule out the possibility that Walker's right hand could have been contaminated from his (Skuse's) own hands, as Walker was the last of the five men to be swabbed at Morecambe police station, and had at first tested negative to the Griess test, before a second swab had revealed faint, positive traces of ammonium and nitrates. This testimony was refuted by Dr. Hugh Kenneth Black, a former Chief Inspector of Explosives for the Home Office, who testified that a range of innocuous substances and objects one could handle on a daily basis containing nitrocellulose (such as varnishes and paints) would produce a positive result to a Griess test. Moreover, the tests conducted by Skuse had not succeeded in identifying nitroglycerine as the source of the positive results produced by the Griess tests, and the Crown had earlier conceded that an exhaustive search of the six men's homes had revealed no traces of nitroglycerine.

Several weeks into the trial, Mr Justice Bridge overruled motions from the defence counsel that the four written confessions obtained from their clients should be omitted from evidence due to their being extorted under extreme physical and mental pressure, instead citing the statements as admissible evidence. These written confessions were presented in evidence at the trial following an eight-day hearing conducted without the presence of the jury. The judge refused to allow the jury to view the written confessions, which would have disclosed not only that each of the four written confessions contradicted details contained within the three other confessions, but that they also contradicted testimony from forensic scientists delivered earlier in the trial as to the devices used to conceal the bombs, and the locations in which they had been placed inside the public houses. For example, William Power had claimed in his written confession that he had placed the bomb which devastated the Mulberry Bush public house by a jukebox at the foot of a staircase to the premises; whereas a forensic scientist named Douglas Higgs had testified on the fourth day of the trial that the bomb which had detonated within these premises had been left by a wall located towards the rear of the premises.

==== Conviction ====
The trial lasted 45 days, and saw one hundred witnesses testify on behalf of the prosecution and defence. On 14 August 1975, the jury retired to consider their verdicts. These deliberations continued until the following day. On the afternoon of 15 August, having deliberated for over six-and-a-half hours, the jury returned unanimous guilty verdicts in relation to the 21 murder charges against the Birmingham Six. Upon passing sentence, Mr Justice Bridge informed the defendants: "You stand convicted of each of 21 counts, on the clearest and most overwhelming evidence I have ever heard, of the crime of murder." All six men were sentenced to life imprisonment. None of the Birmingham Six displayed any emotion upon hearing the verdict, although William Power saluted the judge.

At the same trial, Michael Murray and Michael Sheehan were each convicted of conspiracy to cause explosions and sentenced to nine years' imprisonment. James Kelly was found not guilty of conspiracy to cause explosions, but guilty of the possession of explosives and sentenced to one year's imprisonment; his counsel, Edwin Jowett, successfully argued that his client had already served the equivalent of a one-year sentence, and he was released from prison on 23 August.

After sentencing all nine defendants, Mr Justice Bridge summoned the Chief Constable of Lancashire and the Assistant Chief Constable of the West Midlands to hear a final address; both were commended for their collective efforts in interrogating and obtaining the four confessions presented in evidence. In addressing the defendants' assertions as to physical and psychological abuse while in the custody of both constabularies, Mr Justice Bridge concluded: "These investigations both at Morecambe and Birmingham were carried out with scrupulous propriety by all your officers".

=== Appeals and independent reviews ===
Following their conviction, the Birmingham Six continued to steadfastly maintain their innocence. All six men submitted an application to appeal their convictions; this motion was dismissed by the Court of Appeal in March 1976. Two years later, in November 1978, the Birmingham Six were granted legal aid to sue the Lancashire and West Midlands Police forces, and the Home Office, through the Court of Appeal in relation to the injuries they had suffered in custody. This motion to appeal their convictions on these grounds was challenged by the West Midlands Police, and was stricken by Lord Denning in January 1980, thereby thwarting the attempts of the men to find legal redress for their grievances via these grounds. The Birmingham Six were initially refused permission to further appeal against their convictions. The following year, Patrick Hill embarked on a month-long hunger strike in an unsuccessful bid to have his case reopened.

In 1982, Patrick Hill was visited by civil rights lawyer Gareth Peirce, who agreed to act on his behalf. Peirce also encouraged Hill and his co-accused to continue to compile evidence attesting to their innocence and to write to media personnel such as journalist Chris Mullin, and politicians such as Sir John Farr in an effort to garner support for a review of their case. Farr responded to this correspondence in March 1983, and later thoroughly reviewed all documents relating to the men's conviction, concluding that the forensic evidence which existed against the six men was "not worth the paper it was written on".

In 1985, the current affairs news programme World in Action presented the first of six episodes focusing upon the Birmingham pub bombings which seriously challenged the validity of the convictions of the six men. In this first episode broadcast, two distinguished forensic scientists conducted a series of Griess tests upon 35 separate common substances which the men had likely come into contact within their everyday lives.

Each forensic scientist confirmed that only substances containing nitrocellulose produced a positive result, and that the Griess test would only produce a positive reaction to nitrocellulose if conducted in a room at typical room temperature. When asked to comment on testimony delivered at the trial of the Birmingham Six, in which Dr. Skuse had stated that the temperature in a room in which the Griess test was conducted would need to be heated to 60 °C to produce a false positive reaction to nitrocellulose (thereby confusing the reading with nitroglycerine), one of the forensic scientists stated, "Frankly, I was amazed."

Also appearing on this first World in Action episode broadcast was a former West Midlands policeman, who confirmed that each of the Birmingham Six had been subjected to beatings and threats while in the custody of the West Midlands Crime Squad. In addition, a former IRA Chief of Staff, Joe Cahill, on the same programme, acknowledged the IRA's role in the Birmingham pub bombings.

In 1986, British Labour politician and journalist Chris Mullin published Error of Judgement: Truth About the Birmingham Bombings, which provided further evidence that the men had been wrongly convicted. The book included anonymous interviews with some of those who claimed to have been involved in the bombings, and who claimed the protocol 30-minute warning bomb warning had been delayed because the preselected telephone box had been vandalised, and that by the time another telephone box was found, the advance warning had been significantly delayed.

==== 1987 Court of Appeal hearing ====
In January 1987, the Home Office referred the conviction of the Birmingham Six to the Court of Appeal. This motion resulted from the findings of forensic scientists working for the Home Office, who had expressed grave concerns as to the reliability of the Griess tests cited as forensic evidence of the defendants' guilt. In granting this motion, the Home Secretary himself emphasised that he had "little or no confidence" in the reliability of this test. This appeal was heard before three judges of the Court of Appeal in November 1987.

At this hearing, the defence counsels argued that the Birmingham Six were victims of a gross miscarriage of justice, that they had been convicted upon unreliable forensic evidence, and that the signed confessions were contradictory and had been obtained under extreme physical and mental duress. The allegations of physical mistreatment were corroborated by a former policeman named Thomas Clarke, who testified as to the defendants' mistreatment while incarcerated at Winson Green Prison.

This appeal also heard evidence from Mullin, who testified in detail as to the contradictions in the written and verbal confessions obtained from the defendants, both with regards to the events of the day, and with regards to the content of the statements made by their fellow defendants—all purported by the Crown to be solid evidence. Mullin also testified as to the fundamental flaws in the forensic tests conducted upon the men's hands for traces of nitroglycerine.

This evidence was contradicted by Igor Judge, QC, who informed the three judges of the Court of Appeal of the Crown's allegations that police had obtained false confessions by subjecting the men to severe physical and emotional abuse was "baseless", and of his belief that only film footage of the defendants planting the bombs would provide stronger evidence than that which already existed against the Birmingham Six. On 28 January 1988, the Lord Chief Justice of England and Wales again upheld the convictions of the Birmingham Six as safe.

==== Further media exposure ====
In March 1990, ITV broadcast the Granada Television documentary drama, Who Bombed Birmingham?; a drama which recounted the events of the arrest of the Birmingham Six, the evidence presented at the trial and Mullins' then-ongoing efforts to prove Birmingham Six had been the victims of a miscarriage of justice. This documentary drama extensively detailed both the flaws in the forensic evidence against the men, and the extensive physical and psychological abuse to which they had been subjected. The programme named four of five members of the Provisional IRA as having organised and committed the Birmingham pub bombings.

One of these men was Mick Murray, who had been tried alongside the Birmingham Six and convicted of conspiracy to cause explosions. Murray was named as having assisted in the selection of the targets, and had later placed the advance warning call to the Birmingham Post and Birmingham Evening Mail newspapers, which was delayed by a half-hour due to the fact that the pre-selected telephone had been vandalised and another needed to be located, leading to the fateful delay in the warning calls. The other three named in the documentary were Seamus McLoughlin, whom the programme asserted had also planned the atrocities; James Francis Gavin (a.k.a. James Kelly, who had likewise been tried alongside the Birmingham Six and convicted of the possession of explosives), who had allegedly constructed each of the bombs; and Michael Christopher Hayes, who had planted the bombs at the preselected locations. (Note: The same four individuals would be named by "Witness O" at the 2019 inquest into the bombings.)

The executive producer of Who Bombed Birmingham?, Ray Fitzwalter, has stated that those involved in the production of this documentary drama are 100 percent certain that those named as the perpetrators of the Birmingham pub bombings had committed the atrocities. (Note: When broadcast in Ireland, the caption before the credits where these names were given was redacted.)

=== Release ===
"I don't complain that we have a legal system that makes mistakes; that can happen anywhere in the world. What I complain about is that we lack the mechanism for owning up to mistakes".

— Chris Mullin, reflecting on the struggle he and others had undertaken to prove the innocence of the Birmingham Six on the day of their release. 14 March 1991.

On 29 August 1990, as a result of further fresh evidence uncovered following the 1988 dismissal of appeal, the Home Secretary again referred the convictions of the Birmingham Six to the Court of Appeal. This appeal was heard by Lord Justice Lloyd between 4 and 14 March 1991. At the conclusion of this second appeal, the convictions of the Birmingham Six were quashed upon the bases of police fabrication of evidence, the suppression of evidence, and the unreliability of the scientific evidence presented at their 1975 trial. The tests conducted by Skuse upon the defendants' hands for nitroglycerine were deemed by the three Court of Appeal judges as being particularly unreliable and "demonstrably wrong ... even by the state of forensic science in 1974". (Note: Frank Skuse was ordered by the Home Office to retire on the grounds of "limited efficiency" in October 1985. Within a year of his retirement, all 350 cases in which Skuse had provided forensic evidence throughout his career had been reassessed.)

The discrediting of this evidence was sufficient for the Crown to dismiss pleas from the prosecution to find the convictions "unsatisfactory but not unsafe". On the afternoon of 14 March, Lord Justice Lloyd announced his intentions to withdraw the Crown's case against the defendants. Upon announcing his intention to withdraw the convictions, Lord Justice Lloyd informed the Birmingham Six: "In the light of the fresh evidence which has been made available since the last hearing in this court, your appeals will be allowed and you are free to go." (Note: In 1993, five West Midlands Police officers would be charged with perverting the course of justice in connection with the original criminal investigation into the Birmingham Six, although a judge ruled that obtaining a fair trial for these individuals would be impossible.)

Emerging from the Old Bailey to an ecstatic public reception, each of the men addressed the press and public with varying statements including their concern for "many more people—both Irish and English—still wrongfully behind bars".

In 2001, each of the Birmingham Six was subsequently paid between £840,000 and £1.2 million in compensation. (Note: Further unsafe convictions pertaining to cases handled by the West Midlands Serious Crime Squad also emerged in the 1980s, adding to the suspicion that these case may also have been mishandled. A formal investigation into these cases was implemented in 1989. Subsequently, 60 further convictions were quashed over the next three decades.)

== Renewed inquests ==
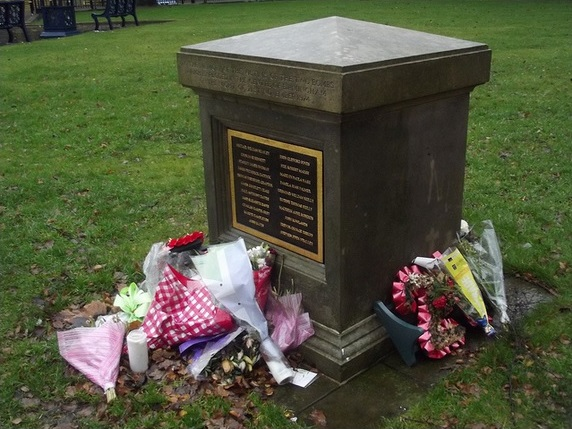
The memorial plaque to the 21 victims of the Birmingham pub bombs within the grounds of Saint Philip's Cathedral

The West Midlands Police and Director of Public Prosecutions, Dame Barbara Mills, reopened their investigation into the Birmingham pub bombings following the release of the Birmingham Six. In April 1994, the Chief Constable of the West Midlands, Ron Hadfield, publicly stated: "The file, so far as we are concerned is now closed ... We have done everything we could possibly have done to bring the perpetrators to justice". Hadfield then emphasised that the Director of Public Prosecutions had found "insufficient evidence for [criminal] proceedings to be taken".

At the conclusion of the 1994 investigation, the Director of Public Prosecutions implemented a 75-year public-interest immunity certificate on documents relating to the Birmingham pub bombings—effectively preventing any release of documents relating to the reinvestigation until 2069. This court order forbids the disclosure of this evidence to the public on the grounds that any disclosure would be deemed to be damaging to the public interest.

On 1 June 2016, the senior coroner for Birmingham and Solihull, Louise Hunt, announced renewed inquests into the Birmingham pub bombings, citing two occasions where evidence clearly indicated the West Midlands Police had received a minimum of two advance warnings of the impending attacks at the two pubs—one of which had been made by known IRA members who had unequivocally stated on 10 November that Birmingham was to be "hit next week". This conversation had been reported to police; no evidence is known to exist showing that the West Midlands Police had taken any effective responsive action to this threat. A second warning had been given to police on the day of the bombings, yet no action is known to have been taken.

Although Hunt states that any claims that police were/are protecting an IRA mole are unfounded, and that the response of emergency services on the night of the blasts did not in any way contribute to the deaths, in one section of her report, she states: "I have serious concerns that advanced notice of the bombs may have been available to the police, and that they failed to take the necessary steps to protect public life."

In September 2018, the Lord Chief Justice ruled that any suspects in the bombings were not due to be named at upcoming inquests into the bombings, the judges present at the hearing having upheld an earlier coroner's decision to omit issues pertaining to responsibility for the bombings in these inquests. (Note: The families of the victims had initially argued the inquests into the bombings should investigate any issues regarding the perpetrator(s) due to the original police investigation into the bombings having resulted in a gross miscarriage of justice. In July 2018, Coroner Sir Peter Thornton QC ruled the names of the alleged perpetrators would not be part of any framework within upcoming inquests.) The renewed inquests commenced on 11 February 2019.

With permission from the current head of the IRA, an individual known only as "Witness O" testified at this inquest on 22 March, naming four men (one of whom was Mick Murray) as responsible for the bombings. He also testified as to his belief that security services had been given adequate time to evacuate both pubs. On 5 April, the jury of 11 found that a botched advance IRA telephone warning contributed to or caused the 21 deaths and that there had been no error or omission in the police response to the given warning call which might have limited the loss of life.

== Independent campaign ==
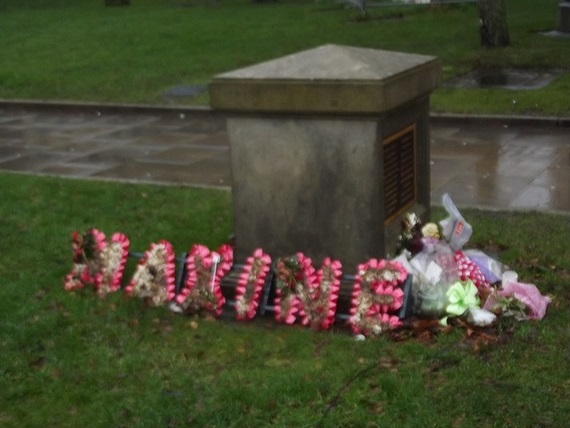
Wreath laid by the family of Maxine Hambleton at the memorial plaque to the 21 victims of the Birmingham pub bombs

In 2011, Brian and Julie Hambleton, who lost their 18-year-old sister Maxine in the Tavern in the Town explosion, initiated a campaign called Justice for the 21. The stated aims of this campaign are to highlight and resolve the fact that, although the inquiry is officially an open one, no efforts are being made to actively pursue the perpetrators of the Birmingham pub bombings unless significant new leads are to surface, and to resolve the issue that the families of the 21 victims have never seen true justice for the loss of their loved ones. Justice for the 21 wants to see the criminal investigation into the bombings reopened and the perpetrators brought to justice or, if deceased, publicly named. When asked in 2012 why she and her brother had instigated this campaign, Julie Hambleton stated: "Someone has to fight for them; someone has to speak on their behalf, because they're not here to do it themselves ... It doesn't matter how much time has passed."

Campaigners for Justice for the 21 believe they have amassed evidence indicating that a British double agent was part of an IRA unit that had committed the pub bombings.

Following a 2014 meeting held at the West Midlands Police headquarters to discuss the findings of a two-year reassessment of all available evidence connected with the original 1974 inquiry, campaigners within Justice for the 21 were informed that unless "new and significant information" was forthcoming, there would be no further inquiry into the Birmingham pub bombings. At this meeting, the Chief Constable of the West Midlands informed the campaigners that 35 pieces of evidence from the original 1974 inquiry were now missing, including the bomb which had been discovered at Hagley Road and safely destroyed in a controlled explosion.

In November 2014, the Justice for the 21 campaign implemented a fresh petition to pressure the British Government to form a new inquiry into the Birmingham pub bombings. This petition was signed by four retired West Midlands Police officers, and by Patrick Hill, who wrote of his desire that a fresh inquiry would "establish the true circumstances of the 1974 Birmingham pub bombings, and to order the release of all government, police, and Crown papers related to the case in order to bring truth and justice for the 21 innocent people who died, the 182 people who were injured, for the six innocent men who were wrongfully convicted, and for the families of all those affected."

Patrick Hill has publicly backed the efforts of the Justice for the 21 campaign, and would later state that, following their 1991 release from prison, the Birmingham Six had been informed of the names of the true perpetrators of the Birmingham pub bombings and that their identities are known among the upper echelons of both the IRA and the British government. Hill stated that, following the 1998 Good Friday Agreement, he has been told that five members of the Provisional IRA have admitted to committing the Birmingham pub bombings, relying on a clause in the Good Friday Agreement offering immunity from prosecution. Two of these men have since died and a further two have been promised immunity, whereas a fifth man reportedly had not received any such assurances.

== Aftermath ==
"Nobody ever apologised to us. We done sixteen and a half years. What happened 30 years ago was a disaster. People say 21 people lost their lives that day. What about the six men who went to prison? We lost our lives also. I felt sorry for what happened in Birmingham that night, but people must remember I done sixteen and a half years in prison for something I did not do."

— John Walker of the Birmingham Six, reflecting on the Birmingham pub bombings, 2004.
- In the weeks and months following the Birmingham pub bombings, Birmingham's Irish community experienced ostracism, assault and abuse. As a result of these tensions, any public celebrations of Irish culture, including the annual St Patrick's Day Parade, were cancelled. Tensions created in the wake of the bombings would take more than a decade to heal.
- In 1983, the Director of the Birmingham Irish Welfare and Information Centre, Rev. Joe Taaffe, reinstated Birmingham's annual St Patrick's Day Parade, with a message that the Irish community in Birmingham should again unashamedly celebrate their heritage without fear of reprisal. Birmingham's annual St Patrick's Day Parade is considered to be the world's third largest St Patrick's Day Parade, with annual attendance figures reaching or surpassing 130,000.

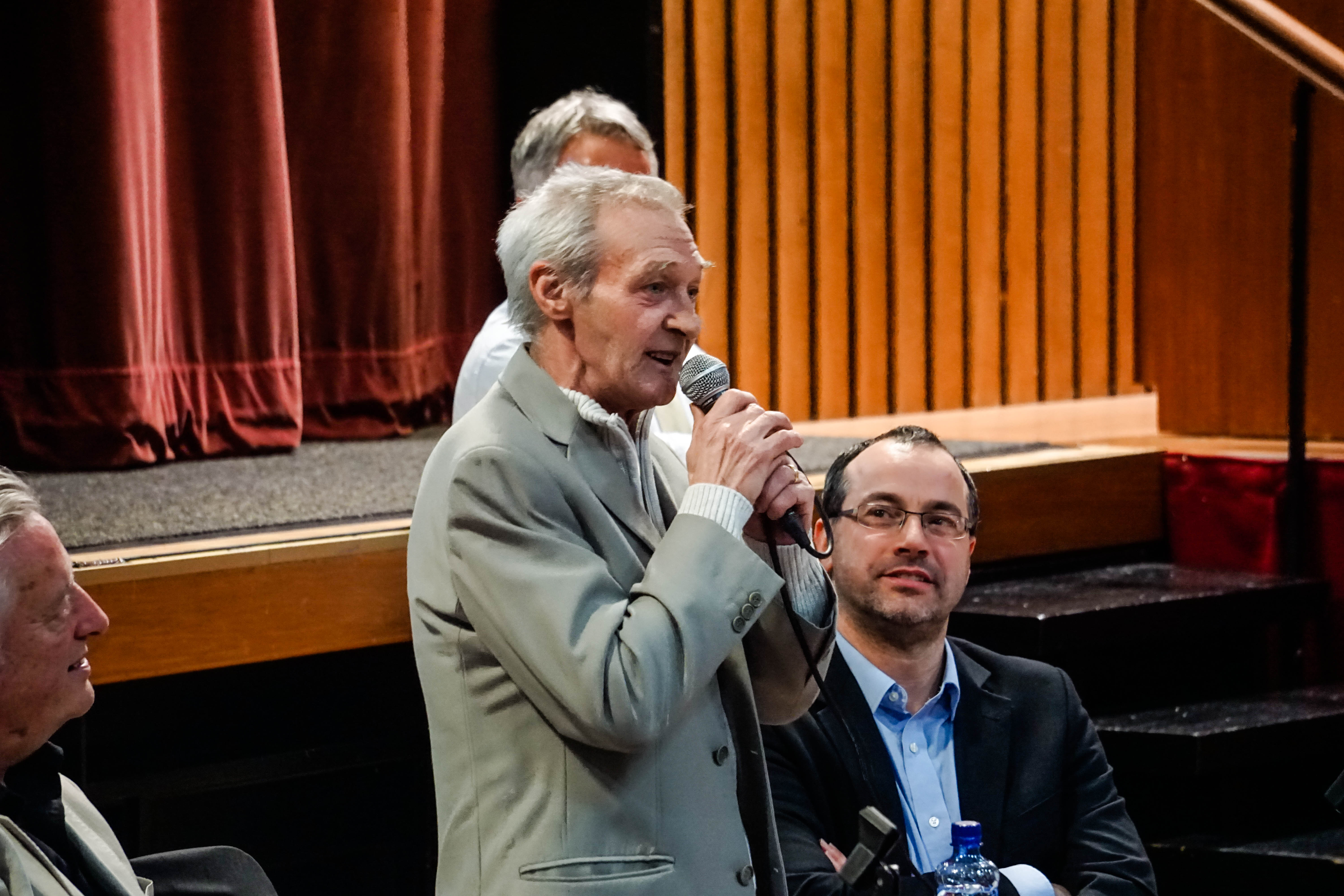
Patrick Hill in 2015. He is seen here addressing an audience as to his advocacy in fighting miscarriages of justice.

- Following his release from prison in 1991, Patrick Hill co-founded of the Miscarriages of Justice Organisation; a group whose dual aims are to provide and improve emotional and physical support for those found to have been wrongly convicted once released from prison, and to provide advocacy for those still inside prison who proclaim their innocence. Patrick Hill and the families of those killed in the Birmingham pub bombings remain united in their efforts to overturn the 75-year public interest immunity order imposed in 1994, and have publicly demanded the British Government order the release of all government, police, and crown papers related to the case. In reference to the public interest immunity order, a spokeswoman for the Justice for the 21 campaign group commented in 2014:

Patrick [Hill] clarified the details of this and the significance of this in relation to the truth being known. With reference to the kind of information that is hidden in these files, it's anyone's guess. But, for us, knowing that they [the files relating to the Birmingham pub bombings] have been locked away for so long, only adds weight to our argument that the government and the police do not want this information to be known until we are all dead. Why do you think that might be? What do they have to hide and who are they protecting?

- In 2004, civil rights campaigner and Catholic priest the Rev. Denis Faul (who had previously campaigned for the release of the Birmingham Six) officially called on the IRA to both admit their culpability in the Birmingham pub bombings, and to apologise. These calls were echoed by Sinn Féin, who stated: "What happened in Birmingham 30 years ago was wrong and should not have happened", adding "[if] issues relating to the IRA concerning the Birmingham bombings are still to be addressed, then it is very clearly the Sinn Féin position that this should happen".
- In 2014, the Birmingham Mail named Michael Murray as the mastermind behind the Birmingham pub bombings. Murray was an admitted member of the Provisional IRA who held a high rank within the Birmingham IRA unit; he had been arrested just four days after the Birmingham pub bombings and had stood trial alongside the Birmingham Six, and although charged only with conspiracy to cause explosions, the prosecutor had suggested Murray may have been the mastermind behind the bombings. Prior to his 1975 trial, Murray had been convicted of separate charges of conspiracy to cause explosions and with causing an explosion.
- The Birmingham Mail alleges Murray had assisted in the construction of the bombs at a house in Bordesley Green, and had then transported them to the city centre, where he had handed them to another person, who then placed them in the preselected targets, before Murray telephoned the delayed warning calls to the two Birmingham newspapers. These allegations are supported by Patrick Hill and John Walker, who remain adamant that at one stage during the 1975 trial, Murray had privately admitted being one of the bombers. Murray allegedly told the two men: "I'm very sorry to see yous in here. Nothing went right that night. The first telephone box we got to was out of order", before threatening the two men that if they ever divulged this admission, both they and their families would be attacked.
- Mick Murray never admitted his alleged involvement in the Birmingham pub bombings. Following his release from prison, he remained active within the Provisional IRA, and later became a vocal opponent of the decommissioning in Northern Ireland as part of the Northern Ireland peace process. He died of a heart attack in County Tipperary in 1999.
- Kieran Conway, a former senior officer of the Provisional Irish Republican Army, admitted in 2014 the IRA had committed the Birmingham pub bombings, adding that he was "appalled and ashamed" at the attack, and that other senior IRA officials shared his opinion the bombings had been immoral and detrimental to the objectives of the republican movement. Conway, however, disputed allegations that an insufficient warning had deliberately been given to security services due to ill-feeling within the IRA over the disrupted funeral arrangements for James McDade, but claimed the perpetrators had tried to use several phone boxes which were either out of order or in use to deliver the protocol 30-minute warning, before finding a free, operable phone box to deliver the warning call.
- On 10 July 2017, BBC Northern Ireland radio released an interview with Michael Christopher Hayes, a self-confessed bomb maker active within the Birmingham IRA unit in the 1970s. In this interview, Hayes (who had been named as a perpetrator of the bombings in the 1990 Granada documentary drama Who Bombed Birmingham?) stated he took "collective responsibility" for the bombings, although he refused to name who had planted the bombs in each of the locations. Nonetheless, he did state: "We were horrified when we heard, because it was not intended. I personally defused the third bomb. It was not the intention of the IRA to kill innocent people ... It wouldn't have been done if that was the case."

Memorial to those killed in the Birmingham pub bombings, unveiled outside New Street Station on 21 November 2018

- On 18 November 2020, a 65-year-old man was arrested in Belfast under section 41 of the Terrorism Act 2000 in connection with the bombings. He was released the following day without charge.

== Memorials ==
A memorial plaque for the victims stands in the grounds of Birmingham's Saint Philip's Cathedral. This plaque is engraved with the names of the 21 people killed in the Birmingham pub bombings, and bears the inscription: "The people of Birmingham remember them and those who suffered."

A memorial commemorating those lost and wounded in the Birmingham pub bombings was unveiled on 21 November 2018. Commissioned by the Birmingham Irish Association and designed by a local artist named Anuradha Patel, this memorial consists of three steel trees, and is located outside the city's New Street Station.

Several survivors and relatives of those killed in the Birmingham pub bombings have visited the Glencree Centre for Peace and Reconciliation in the Republic of Ireland in an effort to come to terms with the events of 21 November 1974. The Glencree Centre is a charitable organisation whose stated aim is to promote peace and reconciliation in Britain and Ireland as a response to the Troubles. One of those who has visited the Glencree Centre, Maureen Carlin (who survived the Mulbery Bush bombing), said in 2009 that she had spoken with two former IRA members, who referred to the Birmingham pub bombings as a mistake for which the IRA would never publicly admit responsibility.

== Media ==
=== Film ===
The made-for-TV film Who Bombed Birmingham? was first broadcast in 1990. Directed by Mike Beckham, the film is directly inspired by the painstaking efforts of journalist Chris Mullin to prove the six men convicted of the bombing had been the victims of a miscarriage of justice, as detailed in his 1986 book Error of Judgement: The Truth about the Birmingham Bombings. The film casts John Hurt as Mullin and Martin Shaw as Granada Television World in Action producer and fellow researcher Ian McBride, as they investigate the convictions of the "Birmingham Six."

=== Books ===
- Encyclopedia of Modern Murder 1962–1982, by Colin Wilson (ISBN 978-0-517-66559-6)
- Error of Judgement: The Truth about the Birmingham Bombings, by Chris Mullin (ISBN 978-1-853-71365-1)
- Forever Lost, Forever Gone, by Patrick Hill (ISBN 978-0-747-52125-9)
- Lost Lives: The Stories of the Men, Women and Children Who Died as a Result of the Northern Ireland Troubles, by David McKittrick (ISBN 978-1-780-57649-7)
- The Birmingham Bombs, by Brian Gibson (ISBN 978-0-859-92070-4)
- The Birmingham Six and Other Cases: Victims of Circumstance, by Louis Blom-Cooper (ISBN 978-0-715-62813-3)

=== Television ===
- The British investigative current affairs programme World in Action has broadcast a total of six episodes focusing upon the Birmingham pub bombings between 1985 and 1991. The last of these episodes, World in Action Special: The Birmingham Six – Their Own Story, was broadcast on 18 March 1991—four days after the release of the Birmingham Six—and was later nominated for a BAFTA award.
- The BBC have commissioned a 30-minute documentary focusing upon the Birmingham pub bombings. This documentary, Who Murdered Maxine?, was first broadcast in December 2013 and focuses upon the ongoing campaign by relatives of one of those killed in the Birmingham pub bombings, Maxine Hambleton, to reopen the investigation into the bombings and their ongoing efforts to raise public awareness of their campaign.

== See also ==
- Chronology of Provisional Irish Republican Army actions (1970–79)
- List of miscarriage of justice cases

== Cited works and further reading ==
- Chalk, Peter (2012). The Encyclopedia of Terrorism – Volume 1. ABC-CLIO. ISBN 978-0-313-30895-6.
- Davis, Jennifer (2013). Wrongly Convicted: Miscarriages of Justice. RW Press Ltd. ISBN 978-1-909-28440-1.
- Geraghty, Tony (1998). The Irish War: The Hidden Conflict Between the IRA and British Intelligence. Harper Collins. ISBN 0-8018-6456-9.
- Gibson, Brian (1976). The Birmingham Bombs. Barry Rose Law. ISBN 978-0-859-92070-4.
- Hill, Patrick (1996). Forever Lost, Forever Gone. Bloomsbury Publishing. ISBN 978-0-747-52125-9.
- McGladdery, Gary (2006). The Provisional IRA in England: The Bombing Campaign 1973–1997. Irish Academic Press Ltd. ISBN 978-0-716-53374-0.
- Mullin, Chris (1997). Error of Judgement: The Truth about the Birmingham Bombings. Poolbeg Press. ISBN 978-1-853-71365-1.
- Robins, Jon (2018). Guilty Until Proven Innocent: The Crisis in Our Justice System. Biteback Publishing. ISBN 978-1-785-90390-8.
- Sandbrook, Dominic (2012). Seasons in the Sun: The Battle for Britain, 1974–1979. Allen Lane Publishers. ISBN 978-0-141-03216-0.
- White, Robert W. (2020) [2006]. Ruairí Ó Brádaigh: The Life and Politics of an Irish Revolutionary. Indiana University Press. ISBN 978-0-253-34708-4.
- Wilson, Colin (1985). Encyclopedia of Modern Murder 1962–1982. Bonanza Books. ISBN 978-0-517-66559-6.
