= Louise Hunt (coroner) =

British coroner

Louise Hunt is a British coroner. When she became HM Coroner for Birmingham and Solihull in 2013, she was the first female ever to take up the role. Before becoming the coroner, she worked as a nurse and earned a law degree. Hunt was appointed to the rolls as a solicitor in 1995. In 2016 ordered a new inquest into the Birmingham pub bombings of 1974.

== Life ==
Louise Hunt grew up in Newcastle-under-Lyme, leaving her hometown for Birmingham at 18 to work as a nurse at Queen Elizabeth Hospital Birmingham in 1984. She graduated with a law degree in 1992, and was appointed to the rolls as a solicitor in 1995. She also earned a master's degree in healthcare ethics and law from Manchester University. On 2008 she was appointed Deputy Coroner for Coventry and Warwickshire, and then senior coroner for Powys, Bridgend and Glamorgan Valleys in 2012. She was appointed as Birmingham Coroner in 2013 on the resignation of Aidan Cotter OBE who had been in the role for a little more than a decade. In the process, Louise became the first female coroner in Birmingham and only the ninth person to hold the role of Birmingham Coroner since 1840. Hunt is the senior coroner for Birmingham and Solihull.

In 2016 she was asked by a campaign of bereaved families to resume the inquest into the Birmingham pub bombings of 1974. Hunt ordered a new investigation in June 2016. The renewed inquests commenced on in February 2019, and were heard by Sir Peter Thornton QC.

Other high profile cases Hunt has been involved with include the inquest into the beheading of Matthew Lynch by Kyle Doughty in 2023, and the death of Aston Villa player Gary Shaw.

Preceded by Aidan Cotter	Birmingham and Solihull Coroner; 2013-present	Succeeded by Incumbent
