= Donald Farquharson (judge) =

British judge (1928–2011)

The Right Honourable Sir Donald Farquharson DL

Lord Justice of Appeal
- In office 1989–1995
- Preceded by: Sir John May

Justice of the High Court
- In office 1981–1989

Personal details
- Born: Donald Henry Farquharson

Sir Donald Henry Farquharson, PC, DL (26 February 1928 – 21 August 2011) was a British barrister judge, who served as a High Court Judge and as a Lord Justice of Appeal.

== Biography ==
The younger son of a civil engineer who died prematurely because of wounds sustained during the First World War, Farquharson was educated at the Royal Commercial Travellers School before studying at Keble College, Oxford, where he read law. He was called to the bar by the Inner Temple in 1952 and thereafter practised as a barrister. Described as "one of the outstanding criminal barristers of his generation", he mostly acted as prosecutor and was involved in many high-profile trials. Notably, he prosecuted Cynthia Payne, the "Streatham madam" who was convicted of keeping a brothel.

He was appointed Deputy Chairman of the Essex Quarter Sessions in 1970, and took silk in 1972. He was a Recorder of the Crown Court from 1972 until 1981, when he was appointed as a judge of the High Court of Justice, assigned to the Queen's Bench Division.

He received the customary knighthood upon appointment. In 1989, he was promoted to become a Lord Justice of Appeal as a member of the Court of Appeal, and became a member of the Privy Council. He was made an honorary fellow of Keble College in the same year.

He was chairman of the Judicial Studies Board from 1992 to 1994. Farquharson retired from the bench in 1995 due to the onset of Parkinson's disease.
