= Bridgewater Four =

English miscarriage of justice

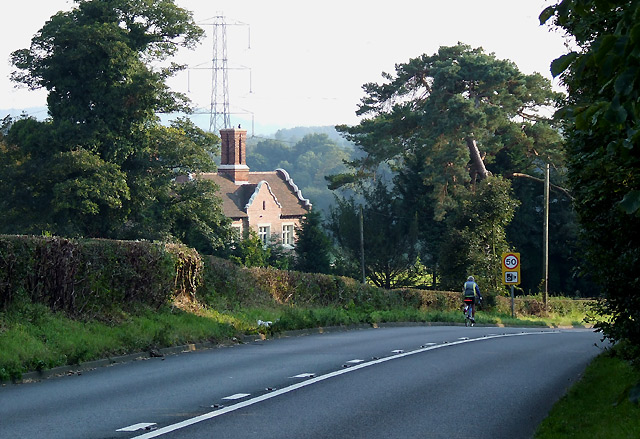
Yew Tree Farm, A449 approaching Stourton, Staffordshire, 2008

The Bridgewater Four were four men who were tried and found guilty of killing 13-year-old paperboy Carl Bridgewater, who was shot in the head at close range near Stourbridge, England, in 1978. In February 1997, after almost two decades of imprisonment, their convictions were overturned and the three surviving defendants were released; the fourth defendant had died in prison two years into his sentence. Bridgewater's murder remains unsolved.

The investigations were carried out by the West Midlands Serious Crime Squad, which was later disbanded after an inquiry into corruption and mismanaged investigations.

== Murder ==
Murder of Carl Bridgewater
- Location: 52.47632°N 2.1925°W; Stourton, West Midlands, UK
- Date: 1978
- Attack type: Shooting
- Deaths: 1

Carl Bridgewater (2 January 1965 – 19 September 1978) was shot dead on 19 September 1978 at Yew Tree Farm near Stourbridge, West Midlands, while delivering a newspaper to the house. The occupants of the house, elderly cousins Mary Poole and Fred Jones, were not home at the time. Police believed that Carl Bridgewater had arrived at the house and disturbed an intruder or burglar, and was subsequently forced into the living room of the house where he was shot once in the head at close range with a shotgun.

== Conviction and sentencing ==
R v Robinson & Hickey
- Court: Stafford Crown Court
- Decided: November 12, 1979; 46 years ago
- Verdict: Guilty
- Charge: Murder

Case history
- Subsequent action: Appeal

The Bridgewater Four were Patrick Molloy, James Robinson and cousins Michael and Vincent Hickey. They came to the attention of police working on the murder investigation following further armed robberies later in 1978. On 24 November, Robinson, Hickey and an unidentified third man carried out an armed robbery at a Tesco supermarket on the Castle Vale estate in Birmingham. Hickey and Robinson raided the safe while the third man held several terrified shoppers at bay with a gun. When the store manager tried to intervene, a shot was fired over his head.

Six days later, Robinson and the Hickey cousins robbed an elderly couple at Chapel Farm, Romsley, near Halesowen. Vincent stayed in the car while Robinson and Michael charged into the house wearing balaclavas, brandishing a shotgun and shouting for money. The victims of this robbery displayed great courage but the robbers got away with £200. Robinson took the lead, hitting one of the victims with the gun but not firing it.

Molloy was the first to be arrested. During questioning which also covered the murder, Molloy told police that he had been in an upstairs bedroom at Yew Tree Farm while robbing the house when he heard a gunshot downstairs. Shortly afterwards, the other three men were arrested.

All denied committing murder, but three of them were convicted of murder at Stafford Crown Court on 9 November 1979. The fourth, Molloy, was found guilty of manslaughter. They were sentenced on 12 November.

James Robinson (aged 45) and Vincent Hickey (aged 25) were both sentenced to life imprisonment with a recommended minimum term of 25 years, which would have kept them behind bars until at least 2004 and the ages of 70 and 50 respectively. Michael Hickey (aged 18) was sentenced to be detained indefinitely at Her Majesty's pleasure, though it was anticipated he would serve a shorter sentence than the two others convicted of murder due to his age. Patrick Molloy (aged 51) received a 12-year prison sentence on the manslaughter charge, but he died of a heart attack in prison, two years later.

== Case quashed ==
An appeal in March 1989 was rejected, but on 21 February 1997, the convictions of the men were overturned after the Court of Appeal ruled that the trial had been unfair, due to certain areas of evidence fabricated by police in order to persuade the now-deceased Molloy to confess. The Appeal Judges noted that there might still be sufficient evidence to convict Vincent Hickey, but the Crown Prosecution Service chose not to apply for a retrial or to prosecute him on another charge of armed robbery.

The campaign to free and absolve the four men was led by Michael Hickey's mother, Ann Whelan, and campaigning journalist Paul Foot. Preparations were made for a case against four police officers in the Staffordshire force on charges of fabricating evidence, but the case was dropped in December 1998.

The Court of Appeal agreed with a Home Office-appointed assessor that the Hickey cousins should lose a quarter of loss-of-earnings compensation for their free food and accommodation inside prison.

Robinson died on 30 August 2007 of lung cancer at the age of 73.

== Bert Spencer ==
Bert Spencer
- Born: 1939 (age 86–87)
- Occupation: Ambulance driver
- Spouse: Janet Spencer (c. 1960-1970s)
- Criminal charge: Manslaughter of Hubert Wilkes

Over the years, convicted murderer Bert Spencer (born 1939) has been mentioned in the media as a possible suspect in the murder. Spencer, a uniformed ambulance driver who worked at Corbett Hospital in Stourbridge lived in Wordsley and was a neighbour of Bridgewater, living five houses away. He was investigated by police in the immediate aftermath of the murder, not least because he drove a blue Vauxhall Viva – the same type of car which had been seen at the farm on the afternoon of the murder. Witnesses also said that the driver of the car was a uniformed man. Spencer had a shotgun licence and was regularly allowed to shoot at Yew Tree Farm. However, he was eliminated from police inquiries within a few months after the arrest of the four other suspects. In December 1979, at a party at neighbouring Holloway Farm to celebrate Spencer's 40th birthday, Spencer shot dead 70-year-old Hubert Wilkes. He admitted to this while claiming it was a case of manslaughter and not murder. Like Carl, Hubert Wilkes had been shot while sitting on a sofa. Spencer was imprisoned for life in 1980 and served 15 years before being paroled in 1995.

Spencer is featured in a book, Scapegoat for Murder: The Truth About the Killing of Carl Bridgewater (D&B Publishing), written by true crime author, Simon W. Golding. The author invited criminologist David Wilson to interview Spencer, and in June 2016, Channel 4 screened a television documentary, Interview with a Murderer. In the course of the "interview of the year", Spencer's daughter revealed that she felt that her father was at Yew Tree Farm on the day of Bridgewater's killing "and possibly saw something". An ambulance station secretary (who was also a friend) who had provided the "cast iron" alibi that he had been "at work all day", admitted that she could not be sure that Spencer had not left at some point. Prof. Wilson, in his final meeting with Spencer, told him that he saw through Spencer's "kindly old grandfather schtick", adding that a P-scan test indicated Spencer was a manipulative and callous psychopath. The documentary concluded with Wilson interviewing Spencer's former wife, who had not spoken publicly before. She said that the day after the murder, Spencer told her he was disposing of his shotgun. She added that, Spencer having chosen to revive the issue to protest his innocence, it seemed likely that the police would reopen the case. However, in March 2017, after looking at the allegations in the television programme, the police told Spencer they would not be taking any action against him.

Spencer initiated court proceedings in May 2024 against author Simon W. Golding, as he claims Golding's book Scapegoat for Murder: The Truth About the Killing of Carl Bridgewater is plagiarized from his own manuscripts, prepared while he was in prison - in 1993/4 with his cell mate, Frank Roden. Golding said: “I’ll go to prison before I send him a penny. The over-riding emotion is anger.”

To date, neither Spencer nor anyone else other than the Bridgewater Four has been charged with the murder of Carl Bridgewater.
