= Michael E. Murray =

American philosopher

Education
- Education: Yale University (PhD), University of Texas, Austin (MA), University of Notre Dame (BA)

Philosophical work
- Era: 21st-century philosophy
- Region: Western philosophy
- Institutions: Vassar College
- Main interests: philosophy of religion

Michael E. Murray is an American philosopher and James Monroe Taylor Professor of Philosophy, Emeritus at Vassar College. He is known for his works on continental philosophy.

== Books ==
- Modern Philosophy of History: Its Origin and Destination, The Hague: Martinus Nijhoff, 1970
- Modern Critical Theory: A Phenomenological Introduction, The Hague: Martinus Nijhoff, 1975
- Heidegger and Modern Philosophy: Critical Essays (ed.). New Haven: Yale University Press, 1978
- Modern Critical Theory and Recent Developments in Aesthetics: Hermeneutics and Deconstruction (in Chinese, and originally entitled Hermeneutics, Deconstruction and the Great Wall of China)
