= Craig Morton (rugby union) =

Australia international rugby union player

- Full name: Craig Anthony Morton
- Born: 1 December 1961 (age 64) Canberra, ACT, Australia
- Height: 178 cm (5 ft 10 in)
- Weight: 74 kg (163 lb)
- School: Chevalier College; Daramalan College

Rugby union career
- Position: Wing
International career
Years	Team	Apps	(Points)
1986	Australia		

Craig Anthony Morton (born 1 December 1961) is an Australian former international rugby union player.

== Biography ==
Morton was born in Canberra and picked up rugby as a student at Chevalier College in Bowral. He finished high school at Canberra's Daramalan College and was a fly-half on their 1st XV, before making his mark in senior rugby playing primarily on the left wing. A regular member of ACT sides, Morton was also a NSW Country representative player.

In 1986, Morton represented Australia at a rugby sevens tournament in Cardiff alongside David Campese, then received his maiden Wallabies call up, to replace an injured Ian Williams on their New Zealand touring squad. He featured in four uncapped matches during the tour and scored three tries, two of which came against Buller.

== See also ==
- List of Australia national rugby union players
