= Michael Murray (rugby union) =

Australia international rugby union player

- Full name: Michael A. Murray
- Born: 17 January 1962 (age 64) Sydney, NSW, Australia
- Height: 185 cm (6 ft 1 in)
- Weight: 91 kg (201 lb)
- School: St Joseph's College

Rugby union career
- Position: Prop
Provincial / State sides
Years	Team	Apps	(Points)
- New South Wales
International career
Years	Team	Apps	(Points)
1986	Australia		

Michael A. Murray (born 17 January 1962) is an Australian former international rugby union player.

Raised in Sydney, Murray picked up rugby union at St Joseph's College, Hunters Hill, where he won their award as the best forward in both 1979 and 1980, playing as a lock. He was an Australian Schools and under-21s representative. After joining Randwick, Murray transitioned into the front row and became a specialist loosehead.

Murray made his New South Wales debut in 1985 and the following year gained a Wallabies call up for their tour of New Zealand. Over the course of the tour, Murray featured in seven fixtures, while for the Tests would be restricted to the bench. There were no further international opportunities for Murray, but he remained an important player for Randwick, co-captaining their 1990 and 1991 premiership teams. He also captained NSW during their 1991 tour of Argentina.

== See also ==
- List of Australia national rugby union players
