= 2019 Rugby World Cup statistics =

This article documents the statistics of the 2019 Rugby World Cup which was held in Japan from 20 September to 2 November.

Russia's Kirill Golosnitsky scored the first try of the tournament and Kotaro Matsushima of Japan scored the first hat-trick of the tournament. Camille Lopez of France scored the first drop goal of the tournament. Dan Biggar of Wales scored the fastest drop goal in Rugby World Cup history, after only 35 seconds in a pool match, Cobus Reinach of South Africa scored the fastest hat-trick ever, scoring his 3rd try after only 20 minutes in the pool stage.

== Team statistics ==
The following table shows the team's results in major statistical categories.

Team statistics
Team	Played	Won	Drawn	Lost	Points for	Points against	Points diff	Tries	Conversions	Penalties	Drop goals	Yellow card	Red card
South Africa	7	6	0	1	262	67	195	33	23	16	1	1	0
England	6	5	0	1	190	75	115	22	16	16	0	0	0
New Zealand	6	5	0	1	250	72	178	36	28	4	0	3	0
Wales	7	5	0	2	189	147	42	22	19	11	2	3	0
Japan	5	4	0	1	118	88	30	13	10	11	0	0	0
Australia	5	3	0	2	152	108	44	21	13	7	0	3	0
France	4	3	0	1	98	71	27	12	10	5	1	0	1
Ireland	5	3	0	2	135	73	62	20	15	1	0	1	1
Argentina	4	2	0	2	106	91	15	14	12	4	0	0	1
Italy	3	2	0	1	98	78	20	14	9	2	0	0	1
Scotland	4	2	0	2	119	55	64	16	13	2	1	0	0
Fiji	4	1	0	3	110	108	2	17	7	3	0	3	0
Georgia	4	1	0	3	65	122	−57	9	7	2	0	1	0
Samoa	4	1	0	3	58	128	−70	8	3	4	0	6	1
Tonga	4	1	0	3	67	105	−38	9	8	2	0	0	0
Uruguay	4	1	0	3	60	140	−80	6	6	6	0	1	1
Canada	3	0	0	3	14	177	−163	2	2	0	0	1	1
Namibia	3	0	0	3	34	175	−141	3	2	5	0	2	0
Russia	4	0	0	4	19	160	−141	1	1	3	1	3	0
United States	4	0	0	4	52	156	−104	7	4	3	0	0	1

Source: ESPNscrum.com

== Try scorers ==
7 tries

- (Wales) Josh Adams

6 tries

- (South Africa) Makazole Mapimpi

5 tries

- (Japan) Kotaro Matsushima

4 tries

- (Argentina) Julián Montoya
- (Japan) Kenki Fukuoka
- (New Zealand) Ben Smith

3 tries

- (Australia) Dane Haylett-Petty
- (Australia) Marika Koroibete
- (England) Luke Cowan-Dickie
- (England) Jonny May
- (England) Manu Tuilagi
- (Ireland) Andrew Conway
- (New Zealand) Beauden Barrett
- (New Zealand) Jordie Barrett
- (Scotland) George Horne
- (South Africa) Cheslin Kolbe
- (South Africa) Bongi Mbonambi
- (South Africa) Cobus Reinach
- (Tonga) Telusa Veainu

2 tries

- (Argentina) Juan Cruz Mallia
- (Argentina) Joaquín Tuculet
- (Australia) Will Genia
- (Australia) Michael Hooper
- (Australia) Tevita Kuridrani
- (Australia) Tolu Latu
- (England) Joe Cokanasiga
- (England) George Ford
- (Fiji) Niko Matawalu
- (Fiji) Waisea Nayacalevu
- (Fiji) Semi Radradra
- (Fiji) Api Ratuniyarawa
- (Fiji) Josua Tuisova
- (France) Gaël Fickou
- (France) Alivereti Raka
- (France) Virimi Vakatawa
- (Georgia (country)) Levan Chilachava
- (Georgia (country)) Alexander Todua
- (Ireland) Rory Best
- (Ireland) Tadhg Furlong
- (Ireland) Rob Kearney
- (Ireland) Garry Ringrose
- (Ireland) Johnny Sexton
- (Italy) Mattia Bellini
- (Italy) Matteo Minozzi
- (New Zealand) Scott Barrett
- (New Zealand) George Bridge
- (New Zealand) Anton Lienert-Brown
- (New Zealand) Joe Moody
- (New Zealand) Sevu Reece
- (New Zealand) Aaron Smith
- (New Zealand) Brad Weber
- (Samoa) Ed Fidow
- (Samoa) Alapati Leiua
- (Scotland) Adam Hastings
- (South Africa) Lukhanyo Am
- (South Africa) Schalk Brits
- (South Africa) Damian de Allende
- (South Africa) Warrick Gelant
- (Tonga) Mali Hingano
- (United States) Blaine Scully
- (United States) Mike Te'o
- (Uruguay) Manuel Diana
- (Wales) Gareth Davies
- (Wales) Liam Williams
- (Wales) Tomos Williams

1 try

- (Argentina) Gonzalo Bertranou
- (Argentina) Santiago Carreras
- (Argentina) Jerónimo de la Fuente
- (Argentina) Matías Moroni
- (Argentina) Guido Petti
- (Argentina) Nicolás Sánchez
- (Australia) Adam Ashley-Cooper
- (Australia) Jack Dempsey
- (Australia) Reece Hodge
- (Australia) Samu Kerevi
- (Australia) Jordan Petaia
- (Australia) James Slipper
- (Australia) Nic White
- (Canada) Andrew Coe
- (Canada) Matt Heaton
- (England) Elliot Daly
- (England) Jamie George
- (England) Lewis Ludlam
- (England) Ruaridh McConnochie
- (England) Jack Nowell
- (England) Kyle Sinckler
- (England) Billy Vunipola
- (England) Ben Youngs
- (England) Anthony Watson
- (Fiji) Mesu Dolokoto
- (Fiji) Semi Kunatani
- (Fiji) Frank Lomani
- (Fiji) Eroni Mawi
- (Fiji) Kini Murimurivalu
- (Fiji) Peceli Yato
- (France) Antoine Dupont
- (France) Yoann Huget
- (France) Charles Ollivon
- (France) Jefferson Poirot
- (France) Baptiste Serin
- (France) Sébastien Vahaamahina
- (Georgia (country)) Jaba Bregvadze
- (Georgia (country)) Otar Giorgadze
- (Georgia (country)) Mamuka Gorgodze
- (Georgia (country)) Giorgi Kveseladze
- (Georgia (country)) Shalva Mamukashvili
- (Ireland) Robbie Henshaw
- (Ireland) Jordan Larmour
- (Ireland) Peter O'Mahony
- (Ireland) Rhys Ruddock
- (Ireland) James Ryan
- (Ireland) CJ Stander
- (Italy) Tommaso Allan
- (Italy) Dean Budd
- (Italy) Carlo Canna
- (Italy) Sebastian Negri
- (Italy) Jake Polledri
- (Italy) Braam Steyn
- (Italy) Tito Tebaldi
- (Italy) Federico Zani
- (Japan) Keita Inagaki
- (Japan) Pieter Labuschagne
- (Japan) Kazuki Himeno
- (Japan) Timothy Lafaele
- (Namibia) JC Greyling
- (Namibia) Chad Plato
- (Namibia) Damian Stevens
- (New Zealand) Ryan Crotty
- (New Zealand) Shannon Frizell
- (New Zealand) Rieko Ioane
- (New Zealand) Richie Mo'unga
- (New Zealand) TJ Perenara
- (New Zealand) Ardie Savea
- (New Zealand) Angus Ta'avao
- (New Zealand) Codie Taylor
- (New Zealand) Matt Todd
- (New Zealand) Sam Whitelock
- (New Zealand) Sonny Bill Williams
- (Russia) Kirill Golosnitsky
- (Samoa) Afa Amosa
- (Samoa) Jack Lam
- (Samoa) Rey Lee-Lo
- (Samoa) Henry Taefu
- (Scotland) John Barclay
- (Scotland) Zander Fagerson
- (Scotland) Greig Laidlaw
- (Scotland) Sean Maitland
- (Scotland) Stuart McInally
- (Scotland) Finn Russell
- (Scotland) Tommy Seymour
- (Scotland) George Turner
- (Scotland) WP Nel
- (South Africa) Faf de Klerk
- (South Africa) Frans Malherbe
- (South Africa) Pieter-Steph du Toit
- (South Africa) Siya Kolisi
- (South Africa) Francois Louw
- (South Africa) Frans Malherbe
- (South Africa) Malcolm Marx
- (South Africa) S'busiso Nkosi
- (South Africa) RG Snyman
- (South Africa) François Steyn
- (South Africa) Damian Willemse
- (Tonga) Siegfried Fisiihoi
- (Tonga) Zane Kapeli
- (Tonga) Siale Piutau
- (Tonga) Sonatane Takulua
- (United States) Bryce Campbell
- (United States) Tony Lamborn
- (United States) Paul Lasike
- (Uruguay) Santiago Arata
- (Uruguay) Germán Kessler
- (Uruguay) Juan Manuel Cat
- (Uruguay) Andrés Vilaseca
- (Wales) Hallam Amos
- (Wales) Jonathan Davies
- (Wales) Ross Moriarty
- (Wales) George North
- (Wales) Hadleigh Parkes
- (Wales) Nicky Smith
- (Wales) Justin Tipuric
- (Wales) Aaron Wainwright

== Conversion scorers ==
20 conversions

- (New Zealand) Richie Mo'unga

14 conversions

- (South Africa) Elton Jantjies

11 conversions

- (England) Owen Farrell

10 conversions

- (Wales) Dan Biggar

9 conversions

- (Japan) Yu Tamura
- (South Africa) Handré Pollard

8 conversions

- (Ireland) Johnny Sexton
- (New Zealand) Jordie Barrett
- (Scotland) Adam Hastings

7 conversions

- (Australia) Christian Lealiifano

6 conversions

- (Argentina) Nicolás Sánchez
- (Australia) Matt To'omua
- (Fiji) Ben Volavola
- (France) Romain Ntamack
- (Georgia (country)) Tedo Abzhandadze
- (Italy) Tommaso Allan
- (Uruguay) Felipe Berchesi
- (Wales) Leigh Halfpenny

5 conversions

- (Argentina) Benjamín Urdapilleta
- (England) George Ford
- (Tonga) Sonatane Takulua

4 conversions

- (Scotland) Greig Laidlaw
- (United States) AJ MacGinty

3 conversions

- (France) Camille Lopez
- (Ireland) Joey Carbery
- (Ireland) Jack Carty
- (Italy) Carlo Canna
- (Wales) Rhys Patchell

2 conversions

- (Canada) Peter Nelson
- (Namibia) Cliven Loubser
- (Samoa) Tusi Pisi

1 conversion

- (Argentina) Emiliano Boffelli
- (Fiji) Josh Matavesi
- (France) Thomas Ramos
- (Georgia (country)) Soso Matiashvili
- (Ireland) Conor Murray
- (Japan) Rikiya Matsuda
- (Russia) Yuri Kushnarev
- (Samoa) Henry Taefu
- (Scotland) Finn Russell
- (Tonga) James Faiva
- (Tonga) Latiume Fosita
- (Tonga) Siale Piutau

== Penalty goal scorers ==
16 penalties

- (South Africa) Handré Pollard

12 penalties

- (England) Owen Farrell

11 penalties

- (Japan) Yu Tamura

6 penalties

- (Uruguay) Felipe Berchesi
- (Wales) Dan Biggar

5 penalties

- (France) Romain Ntamack
- (Wales) Rhys Patchell

4 penalties

- (England) George Ford
- (Samoa) Henry Taefu

3 penalties

- (Argentina) Benjamín Urdapilleta
- (Australia) Christian Lealiifano
- (Fiji) Ben Volavola
- (Namibia) Damian Stevens
- (New Zealand) Richie Mo'unga
- (Russia) Yuri Kushnarev
- (United States) AJ MacGinty

2 penalties

- (Australia) Matt To'omua
- (Georgia (country)) Soso Matiashvili
- (Italy) Tommaso Allan
- (Namibia) Cliven Loubser
- (Scotland) Greig Laidlaw
- (Tonga) Sonatane Takulua

1 penalty

- (Argentina) Nicolás Sánchez
- (Australia) Bernard Foley
- (Australia) Reece Hodge
- (Ireland) Jack Carty
- (New Zealand) Beauden Barrett

== Drop goal scorers ==
1 drop goal

- (France) Camille Lopez
- (Russia) Yuri Kushnarev
- (Scotland) Stuart Hogg
- (South Africa) Handré Pollard
- (Wales) Dan Biggar
- (Wales) Rhys Patchell

== Point scorers ==
Overall points scorers
Player	Team	Total	Details			
Player	Team	Total	Tries	Conversions	Penalties	Drop goals
Handré Pollard	South Africa	69	0	9	16	1
Owen Farrell	England	58	0	11	12	0
Richie Mo'unga	New Zealand	54	1	20	3	0
Yu Tamura	Japan	51	0	9	11	0
Dan Biggar	Wales	41	0	10	6	1
Josh Adams	Wales	35	7	0	0	0
George Ford	England	32	2	5	4	0
Jordie Barrett	New Zealand	31	3	8	0	0
Makazole Mapimpi	South Africa	30	6	0	0	0
Felipe Berchesi	Uruguay	30	0	6	6	0
Elton Jantjies	South Africa	28	0	14	0	0
Romain Ntamack	France	27	0	6	5	0
Johnny Sexton	Ireland	26	2	8	0	0
Adam Hastings	Scotland	26	2	8	0	0
Kotaro Matsushima	Japan	25	5	0	0	0
Rhys Patchell	Wales	24	0	3	5	1
Christian Lealiifano	Australia	23	0	7	3	0
Tommaso Allan	Italy	23	1	6	2	0
Ben Volavola	Fiji	21	0	6	3	0
Sonatane Takulua	Tonga	21	1	5	2	0
Julián Montoya	Argentina	20	4	0	0	0
Nicolás Sánchez	Argentina	20	1	6	1	0
Kenki Fukuoka	Japan	20	4	0	0	0
Ben Smith	New Zealand	20	4	0	0	0
Benjamín Urdapilleta	Argentina	19	0	5	3	0
Henry Taefu	Samoa	19	1	1	4	0
Greig Laidlaw	Scotland	19	1	4	2	0
Matt To'omua	Australia	18	0	6	2	0
Beauden Barrett	New Zealand	18	3	0	1	0
AJ MacGinty	United States	17	0	4	3	0
Dane Haylett-Petty	Australia	15	3	0	0	0
Marika Koroibete	Australia	15	3	0	0	0
Luke Cowan-Dickie	England	15	3	0	0	0
Jonny May	England	15	3	0	0	0
Manu Tuilagi	England	15	3	0	0	0
Andrew Conway	Ireland	15	3	0	0	0
George Horne	Scotland	15	3	0	0	0
Cheslin Kolbe	South Africa	15	3	0	0	0
Bongi Mbonambi	South Africa	15	3	0	0	0
Cobus Reinach	South Africa	15	3	0	0	0
Telusa Veainu	Tonga	15	3	0	0	0
Damian Stevens	Namibia	14	1	0	3	0
Yuri Kushnarev	Russia	14	0	1	3	1
Tedo Abzhandadze	Georgia	12	0	6	0	0
Carlo Canna	Italy	11	1	3	0	0
Joaquín Tuculet	Argentina	10	2	0	0	0
Juan Cruz Mallia	Argentina	10	2	0	0	0
Will Genia	Australia	10	2	0	0	0
Michael Hooper	Australia	10	2	0	0	0
Tolu Latu	Australia	10	2	0	0	0
Tevita Kuridrani	Australia	10	2	0	0	0
Joe Cokanasiga	England	10	2	0	0	0
Niko Matawalu	Fiji	10	2	0	0	0
Waisea Nayacalevu	Fiji	10	2	0	0	0
Semi Radradra	Fiji	10	2	0	0	0
Api Ratuniyarawa	Fiji	10	2	0	0	0
Josua Tuisova	Fiji	10	2	0	0	0
Gaël Fickou	France	10	2	0	0	0
Alivereti Raka	France	10	2	0	0	0
Virimi Vakatawa	France	10	5	0	0	0
Levan Chilachava	Georgia	10	2	0	0	0
Alexander Todua	Georgia	10	2	0	0	0
Rory Best	Ireland	10	2	0	0	0
Tadhg Furlong	Ireland	10	2	0	0	0
Rob Kearney	Ireland	10	2	0	0	0
Garry Ringrose	Ireland	10	2	0	0	0
Mattia Bellini	Italy	10	2	0	0	0
Matteo Minozzi	Italy	10	2	0	0	0
Cliven Loubser	Namibia	10	0	2	2	0
Scott Barrett	New Zealand	10	2	0	0	0
George Bridge	New Zealand	10	2	0	0	0
Anton Lienert-Brown	New Zealand	10	2	0	0	0
Joe Moody	New Zealand	10	2	0	0	0
Sevu Reece	New Zealand	10	2	0	0	0
Aaton Smith	New Zealand	10	2	0	0	0
Brad Weber	New Zealand	10	2	0	0	0
Ed Fidow	Samoa	10	2	0	0	0
Alapati Leiua	Samoa	10	2	0	0	0
Lukhanyo Am	South Africa	10	2	0	0	0
Schalk Brits	South Africa	10	2	0	0	0
Damian de Allende	South Africa	10	2	0	0	0
Warrick Gelant	South Africa	10	2	0	0	0
Mali Hingano	Tonga	10	2	0	0	0
Blaine Scully	United States	10	2	0	0	0
Mike Te'o	United States	10	2	0	0	0
Manuel Diana	Uruguay	10	2	0	0	0
Gareth Davies	Wales	10	2	0	0	0
Leigh Halfpenny	Wales	10	0	5	0	0
Liam Williams	Wales	10	2	0	0	0
Tomos Williams	Wales	10	2	0	0	0
Camille Lopez	France	9	0	3	0	1
Jack Carty	Ireland	9	0	3	1	0
Reece Hodge	Australia	8	1	0	1	0
Soso Matiashvili	Georgia	8	0	1	2	0
Finn Russell	Scotland	7	1	1	0	0
Siale Piutau	Tonga	7	1	1	0	0
Gonzalo Bertranou	Argentina	5	1	0	0	0
Santiago Carreras	Argentina	5	1	0	0	0
Jerónimo de la Fuente	Argentina	5	1	0	0	0
Matías Moroni	Argentina	5	1	0	0	0
Guido Petti	Argentina	5	1	0	0	0
Adam Ashley-Cooper	Australia	5	1	0	0	0
Jack Dempsey	Australia	5	1	0	0	0
Samu Kerevi	Australia	5	1	0	0	0
Jordan Petaia	Australia	5	1	0	0	0
James Slipper	Australia	5	1	0	0	0
Nic White	Australia	5	1	0	0	0
Andrew Coe	Canada	5	1	0	0	0
Matt Heaton	Canada	5	1	0	0	0
Elliot Daly	England	5	1	0	0	0
Jamie George	England	5	1	0	0	0
Lewis Ludlam	England	5	1	0	0	0
Jack Nowell	England	5	1	0	0	0
Ruaridh McConnochie	England	5	1	0	0	0
Kyle Sinckler	England	5	1	0	0	0
Billy Vunipola	England	5	1	0	0	0
Anthony Watson	England	5	1	0	0	0
Ben Youngs	England	5	1	0	0	0
Mesu Dolokoto	Fiji	5	1	0	0	0
Semi Kunatani	Fiji	5	1	0	0	0
Frank Lomani	Fiji	5	1	0	0	0
Eroni Mawi	Fiji	5	1	0	0	0
Kini Murimurivalu	Fiji	5	1	0	0	0
Peceli Yato	Fiji	5	1	0	0	0
Antoine Dupont	France	5	1	0	0	0
Yoann Huget	France	5	1	0	0	0
Charles Ollivon	France	5	1	0	0	0
Jefferson Poirot	France	5	1	0	0	0
Baptiste Serin	France	5	1	0	0	0
Sébastien Vahaamahina	France	5	1	0	0	0
Jaba Bregvadze	Georgia	5	1	0	0	0
Otar Giorgadze	Georgia	5	1	0	0	0
Mamuka Gorgodze	Georgia	5	1	0	0	0
Giorgi Kveseladze	Georgia	5	1	0	0	0
Shalva Mamukashvili	Georgia	5	1	0	0	0
Robbie Henshaw	Ireland	5	1	0	0	0
Jordan Larmour	Ireland	5	1	0	0	0
Peter O'Mahony	Ireland	5	1	0	0	0
Rhys Ruddock	Ireland	5	1	0	0	0
James Ryan	Ireland	5	1	0	0	0
CJ Stander	Ireland	5	1	0	0	0
Dean Budd	Italy	5	1	0	0	0
Sebastian Negri	Italy	5	1	0	0	0
Jake Polledri	Italy	5	1	0	0	0
Braam Steyn	Italy	5	1	0	0	0
Tito Tebaldi	Italy	5	1	0	0	0
Federico Zani	Italy	5	1	0	0	0
Kazuki Himeno	Japan	5	1	0	0	0
Keita Inagaki	Japan	5	1	0	0	0
Lappies Labuschagné	Japan	5	1	0	0	0
Timothy Lafaele	Japan	5	1	0	0	0
JC Greyling	Namibia	5	1	0	0	0
Chad Plato	Namibia	5	1	0	0	0
Ryan Crotty	New Zealand	5	1	0	0	0
Shannon Frizell	New Zealand	5	1	0	0	0
Rieko Ioane	New Zealand	5	1	0	0	0
TJ Perenara	New Zealand	5	1	0	0	0
Ardie Savea	New Zealand	5	1	0	0	0
Angus Ta'avao	New Zealand	5	1	0	0	0
Codie Taylor	New Zealand	5	1	0	0	0
Matt Todd	New Zealand	5	1	0	0	0
Sonny Bill Williams	New Zealand	5	1	0	0	0
Sam Whitelock	New Zealand	5	1	0	0	0
Kirill Golosnitsky	Russia	5	1	0	0	0
Afa Amosa	Samoa	5	1	0	0	0
Jack Lam	Samoa	5	1	0	0	0
Rey Lee-Lo	Samoa	5	1	0	0	0
John Barclay	Scotland	5	1	0	0	0
Zander Fagerson	Scotland	5	1	0	0	0
Sean Maitland	Scotland	5	1	0	0	0
Stuart McInally	Scotland	5	1	0	0	0
WP Nel	Scotland	5	1	0	0	0
Tommy Seymour	Scotland	5	1	0	0	0
George Turner	Scotland	5	1	0	0	0
Faf de Klerk	South Africa	5	1	0	0	0
Pieter-Steph du Toit	South Africa	5	1	0	0	0
Siya Kolisi	South Africa	5	1	0	0	0
Francois Louw	South Africa	5	1	0	0	0
Frans Malherbe	South Africa	5	1	0	0	0
Malcolm Marx	South Africa	5	1	0	0	0
S'busiso Nkosi	South Africa	5	1	0	0	0
RG Snyman	South Africa	5	1	0	0	0
François Steyn	South Africa	5	1	0	0	0
Damian Willemse	South Africa	5	1	0	0	0
Siegfried Fisiihoi	Tonga	5	1	0	0	0
Zane Kapeli	Tonga	5	1	0	0	0
Bryce Campbell	United States	5	1	0	0	0
Tony Lamborn	United States	5	1	0	0	0
Paul Lasike	United States	5	1	0	0	0
Santiago Arata	Uruguay	5	1	0	0	0
Juan Manuel Cat	Uruguay	5	1	0	0	0
Germán Kessler	Uruguay	5	1	0	0	0
Andrés Vilaseca	Uruguay	5	1	0	0	0
Hallam Amos	Wales	5	1	0	0	0
Jonathan Davies	Wales	5	1	0	0	0
Ross Moriarty	Wales	5	1	0	0	0
George North	Wales	5	1	0	0	0
Hadleigh Parkes	Wales	5	1	0	0	0
Nicky Smith	Wales	5	1	0	0	0
Justin Tipuric	Wales	5	1	0	0	0
Aaron Wainwright	Wales	5	1	0	0	0
Joey Carbery	Ireland	4	0	2	0	0
Peter Nelson	Canada	4	0	2	0	0
Tusi Pisi	Samoa	4	0	2	0	0
Bernard Foley	Australia	3	0	0	1	0
Stuart Hogg	Scotland	3	0	0	0	1
Emiliano Boffelli	Argentina	2	0	1	0	0
Josh Matavesi	Fiji	2	0	1	0	0
Thomas Ramos	France	2	0	1	0	0
Conor Murray	Ireland	2	0	1	0	0
Rikiya Matsuda	Japan	2	0	1	0	0
James Faiva	Tonga	2	0	1	0	0
Latiume Fosita	Tonga	2	0	1	0	0

== Kicking accuracy ==
Kicking accuracy
Player	Team	Percentage
Felipe Berchesi	Uruguay	85.71% (12/14)

== Scoring ==
=== Overall ===
- Total number of points scored: 2,195
- Average points per match: 48.8
- Total number of tries scored: 285 (including 8 penalty tries)
- Average tries per match: 6.3
- Total number of braces: 28
- Total number of hat-tricks: 5
- Total number of conversions missed: 277
- Total number of conversions scored: 69
- Conversion success rate: ??%
- Total number of penalty goals missed: ??
- Total number of penalty goals scored: 107
- Penalty goal success rate: ??%
- Total number of drop goals scored: 6

=== Timing ===
- First try of the tournament: Kirill Golosnitsky for Russia against Japan
- First brace of the tournament: Kotaro Matsushima for Japan against Russia
- First hat-trick of the tournament: Kotaro Matsushima for Japan against Russia
- Last try of the tournament: Cheslin Kolbe for South Africa against England
- Last brace of the tournament: Ben Smith for New Zealand against Wales
- Last hat-trick of the tournament: Josh Adams for Wales against Fiji
- Fastest try in a match from kickoff: 2nd minute (1:29), Rob Kearney for Ireland against Russia
- Fastest try in a match from a restart-kick: 19 seconds after a restart, Gareth Davies for Wales against Australia
- Latest try in a match: 80+5th minute (84:26), Kotaro Matsushima for Japan against Samoa
- Fastest Bonus Point try: 18th minute (17:21), Cobus Reinach for South Africa against Canada
- Latest Bonus Point try: 80+5th minute (84:26), Kotaro Matsushima for Japan against Samoa
- Fastest point scored in a match: 1st minute (00:36), Dan Biggar's drop-goal for Wales against Australia

=== Teams ===
- Most points scored by a team in the pool stage: 185 by South Africa
- Fewest points scored by a team in the pool stage: 14 by Canada
- Most points conceded by a team in the pool stage: 177 by Canada
- Fewest points conceded by a team in the pool stage: 27 by Ireland
- Best point difference by a team in the pool stage: +149 by South Africa
- Worst point difference by a team in the pool stage: −163 by Canada
- Most points scored by a team in the knockout stage: 93 by New Zealand
- Fewest points scored by a team in the knockout stage: 3 by Japan
- Most points conceded by a team in the knockout stage: 78 by wales
- Fewest points conceded by a team in the knockout stage: 20 by France
- Most points scored by a team overall: 262 by South Africa
- Fewest points conceded by a team overall: 55 by Scotland
- Most points scored in a match by both teams: 80 points, New Zealand 71–9 Namibia
- Most points scored in a match by one team: 71 by New Zealand
- Most points scored in a match by the losing team: 27 by Fiji
- Biggest margin of victory: 63 by New Zealand
- Most tries scored by a team in the pool stage: 27 by South Africa
- Most tries scored by a team in the knockout stage: 14 by New Zealand
- Fewest tries scored by a team: 1 by Russia
- Most tries scored in a match: 11 tries, New Zealand (11) vs Namibia (0) and
  South Africa (10) vs Canada (1)
- Most tries scored in a match by one team: 11 by New Zealand
- Most wins achieved by a team: 6 by South Africa
- Fewest wins achieved by a team: 0 by
  - Canada
  - Namibia
  - Russia
  - United States
- Most losses achieved by a team: 4 by
  - Russia
  - United States
- Fewest losses achieved by a team: 1 by
  - England
  - France
  - Italy
  - Japan
  - New Zealand
  - South Africa
- Most consecutive wins achieved by a team: 6 by South Africa
- Most consecutive losses achieved by a team: 4 by
  - Russia
  - United States
- Most pool points: 19 by Japan and Wales
- Fewest pool points: 0 by Russia and United States
- Most bonus points: 4 by South Africa
- Fewest bonus points: 0 by
  - Russia
  - United States
- Largest ranking difference win by a lower ranked team: 9 places – Uruguay (19th) vs Fiji (10th)
- Largest ranking difference win by a higher ranked team: 21 places – New Zealand (1st) vs Canada (22nd)

=== Individual ===
- Most points scored by an individual: 69 - Handré Pollard (South Africa)
- Most tries scored by an individual (Back): 7 - Josh Adams (Wales)
- Most tries scored by an individual (Forward): 4 - Julián Montoya (Argentina)
- Most conversions scored by an individual: 20 - Richie Mo'unga (New Zealand)
- Most penalty goals scored by an individual: 16 - Handré Pollard (South Africa)
- Most drop goals scored by an individual: 1
  - Camille Lopez (France)
  - Yuri Kushnarev (Russia)
  - Stuart Hogg (Scotland)
  - Handré Pollard (South Africa)
  - Dan Biggar (Wales)
  - Rhys Patchell (Wales)
- Most tackles made by an individual: 79 - Alun Wyn Jones (Wales)
- Most lineouts won by an individual: 26 - Guido Petti (Argentina)
- Most lineouts stolen by an individual: 5
  - Guido Petti (Argentina)
  - Izack Rodda (Australia)
- Most clean breaks made by an individual: 18 - Josh Adams (Wales)
- Most offloads made by an individual: 12 - Leone Nakarawa (Fiji)
- Most metres made by an individual: 460 - Beauden Barrett (New Zealand)
- Most carries made by an individual: 86 - Beauden Barrett (New Zealand)
- Most turnovers won by an individual: 11 - Maro Itoje (England)
- Most points scored by one player in a match: 26 - Adam Hastings for Scotland vs Russia
- Most tries scored by one player in a match: 3
  - Josh Adams for Wales vs Fiji
  - George Horne for Scotland vs Russia
  - Kotaro Matsushima for Japan vs Russia
  - Julián Montoya for Argentina vs Tonga
  - Cobus Reinach for South Africa vs Canada
- Most conversions scored by one player in a match: 8
  - Jordie Barrett for New Zealand vs Namibia
  - Adam Hastings for Scotland vs Russia
  - Elton Jantjies for South Africa vs Canada
  - Richie Mo'unga for New Zealand vs Canada
- Most penalty goals scored by one player in a match: 6 - Handré Pollard for South Africa vs England
- Highest kicking accuracy by an individual: 100%
  - Benjamín Urdapilleta (Argentina)
  - Peter Nelson (Canada)
  - Joey Carbery (Ireland)
  - Rikiya Matsuda (Japan)
  - Damian Stevens (Namibia)
  - Yuri Kushnarev (Russia)
  - Greig Laidlaw (Scotland)
  - Stuart Hogg (Scotland)
  - Finn Russell (Scotland)
  - Latiume Fosita (Tonga)
- Highest kicking accuracy by an individual (minimum 10 attempts): 70.27% - Handré Pollard for South Africa
- Lowest kicking accuracy by an individual: 0%
  - Ramil Gaisin (Russia)
  - AJ Alatimu (Samoa)
- Lowest kicking accuracy by an individual (minimum 10 attempts): 70% - Nicolás Sánchez for Argentina

== Hat-tricks ==
Unless otherwise noted, players in this list scored a hat-trick of tries.

Rank	Player	Team	Opponent	Stage	Result	Venue	Date
1	Kotaro Matsushima	Japan	Russia	Pool	30–10	Tokyo Stadium, Chōfu	20 September 2019
2	Julián Montoya	Argentina	Tonga	Pool	28–12	Hanazono Rugby Stadium, Higashiōsaka	28 September 2019
3	Cobus Reinach	South Africa	Canada	Pool	66–7	Kobe Misaki Stadium, Kobe	8 October 2019
4	George Horne	Scotland	Russia	Pool	61–0	Shizuoka Stadium Ecopa, Fukuroi	9 October 2019
5	Josh Adams	Wales	Fiji	Pool	29–17	Oita Stadium, Ōita	9 October 2019

== Man of the match awards ==
Rank	Player	Team	Opponent	Awards
1	Semi Radradra	Fiji	Georgia (PM), Wales (PM)	2
1	Beauden Barrett	New Zealand	South Africa (PM), Ireland (QF)	2
2	Juan Cruz Mallia	Argentina	United States (PM)	1
2	Julián Montoya	Argentina	Tonga (PM)	1
2	Tevita Kuridrani	Australia	Uruguay (PM)	1
2	Tolu Latu	Australia	Fiji (PM)	1
2	Izack Rodda	Australia	Georgia (PM)	1
2	Maro Itoje	England	New Zealand (SF)	1
2	Tom Curry	England	Australia (QF)	1
2	George Ford	England	United States (PM)	1
2	Manu Tuilagi	England	Tonga (PM)	1
2	Sam Underhill	England	Argentina (PM)	1
2	Gaël Fickou	France	Argentina (PM)	1
2	Camille Lopez	France	United States (PM)	1
2	Alivereti Raka	France	Tonga (PM)	1
2	Otar Giorgadze	Georgia	Uruguay (PM)	1
2	Jordan Larmour	Ireland	Samoa (PM)	1
2	Rhys Ruddock	Ireland	Russia (PM)	1
2	CJ Stander	Ireland	Scotland (PM)	1
2	Jake Polledri	Italy	Canada (PM)	1
2	Federico Ruzza	Italy	Namibia (PM)	1
2	Kenki Fukuoka	Japan	Scotland (PM)	1
2	Shota Horie	Japan	Ireland (PM)	1
2	Lomano Lemeki	Japan	Samoa (PM)	1
2	Kotaro Matsushima	Japan	Russia (PM)	1
2	Anton Lienert-Brown	New Zealand	Namibia (PM)	1
2	Richie Mo'unga	New Zealand	Canada (PM)	1
2	Brodie Retallick	New Zealand	Wales (BF)	1
2	Alapati Leiua	Samoa	Russia (PM)	1
2	Jonny Gray	Scotland	Samoa (PM)	1
2	Adam Hastings	Scotland	Russia (PM)	1
2	Lood de Jager	South Africa	Namibia (PM)	1
2	Faf de Klerk	South Africa	Japan (QF)	1
2	Cheslin Kolbe	South Africa	Italy (PM)	1
2	Handré Pollard	South Africa	Wales (SF)	1
2	RG Snyman	South Africa	Canada (PM)	1
2	Duane Vermeulen	South Africa	England (GF)	1
2	Siale Piutau	Tonga	United States (PM)	1
2	Felipe Berchesi	Uruguay	Fiji (PM)	1
2	Jake Ball	Wales	Georgia (PM)	1
2	Gareth Davies	Wales	Australia (PM)	1
2	Leigh Halfpenny	Wales	Uruguay (PM)	1
2	Aaron Wainwright	Wales	France (QF)	1

== Squads ==
=== Coaches ===
- Oldest coach: Jacques Brunel of France - (65 years and 279 days) in the quarter-final game against Wales.
- Youngest coach: Toutai Kefu of Tonga - (45 years and 167 days) in the first game against England.
- Country with most coaches: New Zealand (7)
  - John Mckee of Fiji
  - Milton Haig of Georgia
  - Joe Schmidt of Ireland
  - Jamie Joseph of Japan
  - Steve Hansen of New Zealand
  - Steve Jackson of Samoa
  - Warren Gatland of Wales
- Teams with foreign coaches: 14
  - Canada
  - England
  - Fiji
  - Georgia
  - Ireland
  - Italy
  - Japan
  - Namibia
  - Russia
  - Samoa
  - Tonga
  - United States
  - Uruguay
  - Wales
- Coaches who were former players: 7.
  - Phil Davies of Namibia (1987 and 1991 with Wales)
  - Rassie Erasmus of South Africa (1999 with South Africa)
  - Jamie Joseph of Japan (1995 with New Zealand and 1999 with Japan)
  - Toutai Kefu of Tonga (1999 with Australia)
  - Mario Ledesma of Argentina (1999, 2003, 2007 and 2011 with Argentina)
  - Conor O'Shea of Italy (1995 and 1999 with Ireland)
  - Gregor Townsend of Scotland (1999 and 2003 with Scotland)
- Longest serving coach: Warren Gatland of Wales since November 2007.
- Shortest serving coach: Steve Jackson of Samoa since September 2018.
- Coaches with previous Head Coaching World Cup experience: 10
  - Jacques Brunel of France (Head Coach of Italy in 2015)
  - Michael Cheika of Australia (Head Coach of Australia in 2015)
  - Phil Davies of Namibia (Head Coach of Namibia in 2015)
  - Warren Gatland of Wales (Head Coach of Ireland in 1999 & Head Coach of Wales in 2011 & 2015)
  - Milton Haig of Georgia (Head Coach of Georgia in 2015)
  - Steve Hansen of New Zealand (Head Coach of Wales in 2003 & Head Coach of New Zealand in 2015)
  - Eddie Jones of England (Head Coach of Australia in 2003 & Head Coach of Japan in 2015)
  - Kingsley Jones of Canada (Head Coach of Russia in 2011)
  - John McKee of Fiji (Head Coach of Fiji in 2015)
  - Joe Schmidt of Ireland (Head Coach of Ireland in 2015)

=== Players ===
- Five squads had no players based outside their respective home countries:
  - England
  - France
  - Ireland
  - Japan
  - New Zealand
- Squads having the fewest players playing domestically are: Tonga (0)
- The most players (96) are active in clubs based in France, the majority of them in the Top 14, with some in the lower leagues.
- Appearance record: Sergio Parisse of Italy participated in the Rugby World Cup for the fifth time, equalling the record of compatriot Mauro Bergamasco and Samoa player Brian Lima.
- Oldest player: Luke Thompson of Japan (38 years and 187 days - vs South Africa)
- Youngest player: Vano Karkadze of Georgia (19 years and 96 days - vs Uruguay)
- Beauden Barrett, Jordie Barrett and Scott Barrett became the first trio of brothers to start in a World Cup match (vs Canada) for New Zealand, and the second set to all start in a Rugby World Cup match since Tonga's Elisi Vunipola, Manu Vunipola, and Fe'ao Vunipola in 1995 (vs Scotland). The Barrett brothers are the first trio of brothers to score a try in the same match.

== Discipline ==
- Fewest penalties conceded by a team: 19 by Uruguay
- Most penalties conceded by a team: 61 by Wales
- Fewest penalties conceded on average matches played: 4.75 by Uruguay (4 Games played)
- Most penalties conceded on average matches played: 12.75 by Samoa (4 Games played)
- Most penalties conceded by an individual: 10 by Tyler Ardron (Canada)
- Most penalty tries conceded by one team: 2 by
  - Canada
  - Samoa
- Most penalty tries conceded by one team in a match: 2 by Samoa vs Scotland
- Most yellow cards issued to one team: 6 by Samoa
- Most red cards issued to one team: 1 by
  - Argentina
  - Canada
  - France
  - Ireland
  - Italy
  - Samoa
  - Uruguay
  - United States
- Most cards issued in one match: 4, Wales (2, (yellow card) ) vs Fiji (2, (yellow card) )
- Most citing's issued to one team: 4 by Samoa

=== Yellow cards ===
2 yellow cards

- (Samoa) Ed Fidow (both vs Scotland)
- (Samoa) TJ Ioane (vs Japan & Ireland)

1 yellow card

- (Australia) Adam Coleman (vs Uruguay)
- (Australia) Isi Naisarani (vs Georgia)
- (Australia) Lukhan Salakaia-Loto (vs Uruguay)
- (Canada) Matt Heaton (vs Italy)
- (Fiji) Levani Botia (vs Australia)
- (Fiji) Tevita Cavubati (vs Wales)
- (Fiji) Semi Kunatani (vs Wales)
- (Georgia (country)) Jaba Bregvadze (vs Wales)
- (Ireland) Tadhg Beirne (vs Scotland)
- (Namibia) Adriaan Booysen (vs South Africa)
- (Namibia) Aranos Coetzee (vs South Africa)
- (New Zealand) Nepo Laulala (vs Namibia)
- (New Zealand) Matt Todd (vs Ireland)
- (New Zealand) Ofa Tu'ungafasi (vs Namibia)
- (Russia) Bogdan Fedotko (vs Ireland)
- (Russia) Kirill Gotovtsev (vs Samoa)
- (Russia) Andrei Ostrikov (vs Ireland)
- (Samoa) Rey Lee-Lo (vs Russia)
- (Samoa) Motu Matu'u (vs Russia)
- (South Africa) Tendai Mtawarira (vs Japan)
- (Uruguay) Santiago Civetta (vs Wales)
- (Wales) James Davies (vs Fiji)
- (Wales) Ken Owens (vs Fiji)
- (Wales) Ross Moriarty (vs France)

=== Red cards ===
A record fifth red card for a Rugby World Cup was issued, surpassing the four given out in 1995 and 1999. In total, eight red cards were issued during the tournament.

1 red card

- (Argentina) Tomás Lavanini (vs England)
- (Canada) Josh Larsen (vs South Africa)
- (France) Sébastien Vahaamahina (vs Wales)
- (Ireland) Bundee Aki (vs Samoa)
- (Italy) Andrea Lovotti (vs South Africa)
- (Samoa) Ed Fidow (vs Scotland)
- (Uruguay) Facundo Gattas (vs Georgia)
- (United States) John Quill (vs England)

=== Penalty tries ===
2 penalty tries

- Awarded against Samoa, vs Scotland

1 penalty try

- Awarded against Canada, vs Italy
- Awarded against Canada, vs New Zealand
- Awarded against Namibia, vs Italy
- Awarded against New Zealand, vs Ireland
- Awarded against Uruguay, vs Wales
- Awarded against Wales, vs Fiji

=== Citing/bans ===
For the 2019 Rugby World Cup, Citing Commissioner Warnings carry the same weight as a yellow card.

Player	Opposition	Cite date	Law breached	Result	Note	Ref
(Argentina) Matías Moroni	France	22 September	9.27 – Hair pulling	Citing Commissioner Warning	–	
(Australia) Reece Hodge	Fiji	22 September	9.13 – Dangerous tackle	3-week ban	–	
(Samoa) Ed Fidow	Russia	25 September	9.12 – Punching or striking	Citing Commissioner Warning	–	
(Samoa) Rey Lee-Lo	Russia	25 September	9.13 – Dangerous high tackle	3-week ban	–	
(Samoa) Motu Matu'u	Russia	25 September	9.13 – Dangerous high tackle	3-week ban	Appeal failed	
(United States) John Quill	England	27 September	9.13 – Dangerous high tackle Red card	3-week ban	–	
(England) Piers Francis	United States	27 September	9.13 – Dangerous high tackle	No further action	–	
(Uruguay) Facundo Gattas	Georgia	29 September	9.13 – Dangerous tackle Red card	3-week ban	Appeal failed	
(Samoa) Ed Fidow	Scotland	30 September	Accumulation of yellow cards Red card	No further action	–	
(Italy) Andrea Lovotti	South Africa	5 October	9.18 – Lifting tackle Red card	3-week ban	–	
(Italy) Nicola Quaglio	South Africa	5 October	9.18 – Lifting tackle	3-week ban	–	
(Argentina) Tomás Lavanini	England	5 October	9.13 – Dangerous tackle Red card	4-week ban	–	
(Canada) Josh Larsen	South Africa	8 October	9.20 – Dangerous play in a ruck or maul Red card	3-week ban	–	
(Ireland) Bundee Aki	Samoa	13 October	9.13 – Dangerous tackle Red card	3-week ban	–	
(Tonga) Paul Ngauamo	United States	14 October	9.12 – Kicking	7-week ban	–	
(Uruguay) Guillermo Pujadas	Wales	14 October	9.27 – Unsportsmanlike Conduct	6-week ban	–	
(France) Sébastien Vahaamahina	Wales	21 October	9.12 – Punching or striking Red card	6-week ban	–	

== Stadiums ==
Stadium	City	Capacity	Matches played	Overall attendance	Average attendance per match	Average attendance as % of capacity	Tries scored	Avg. tries scored / match	Overall points scored	Avg. points scored / match
International Stadium Yokohama	Yokohama	72,327	6	401,742	66,957	92.58%	20	3.33	220	36.67
Shizuoka Stadium Ecopa	Fukuroi	50,889	4	175,886	43,972	86.41%	24	6.00	179	44.75
Tokyo Stadium	Chōfu	49,970	8	374,532	46,817	93.69%	52	6.50	413	51.63
City of Toyota Stadium	Toyota	45,000	3	111,690	37,230	82.73%	22	7.33	174	58.00
Sapporo Dome	Sapporo	41,410	2	72,405	36,203	87.43%	12	6.00	98	49.00
Oita Stadium	Ōita	40,000	5	172,951	34,590	86.48%	34	6.80	259	51.80
Kumamoto Stadium	Kumamoto	32,000	2	55,794	27,897	87.18%	11	5.50	92	46.00
Kobe Misaki Stadium	Kobe	30,132	4	109,650	27,413	90.98%	28	7.00	194	48.50
Hanazono Rugby Stadium	Higashiosaka	24,100	4	85,406	21,352	88.60%	31	7.75	214	53.50
Kumagaya Rugby Stadium	Kumagaya	24,000	3	71,836	23,945	99.77%	22	7.33	147	49.00
Fukuoka Hakatanomori Stadium	Fukuoka	20,049	3	52,611	17,537	87.47%	21	7.00	149	49.67
Kamaishi Recovery Memorial Stadium	Kamaishi	16,020	1	14,025	14,025	87.55%	8	8.00	57	57.00
Total		1,884,193	45	1,698,528	37,745	86.43%	285	6.33	2,196	48.80

=== Attendances ===
Top 10 highest attendances.

Rank	Attendance	Match	Venue	City	Date
1	70,103	England vs South Africa	International Stadium Yokohama	Yokohama	2 November 2019
2	68,843	England vs New Zealand	International Stadium Yokohama	Yokohama	26 October 2019
3	67,750	Wales vs South Africa	International Stadium Yokohama	Yokohama	27 October 2019
4	67,666	Japan vs Scotland	International Stadium Yokohama	Yokohama	13 October 2019
5	63,731	Ireland vs Scotland	International Stadium Yokohama	Yokohama	22 September 2019
6	63,649	New Zealand vs South Africa	International Stadium Yokohama	Yokohama	21 September 2019
7	48,842	New Zealand vs Wales	Tokyo Stadium	Chōfu	1 November 2019
8	48,831	Japan vs South Africa	Tokyo Stadium	Chōfu	20 October 2019
9	48,354	New Zealand vs Namibia	Tokyo Stadium	Chōfu	6 October 2019
10	48,185	England vs Argentina	Tokyo Stadium	Chōfu	5 October 2019
Last updated: 2 November 2019

- Lowest attendance: 14,025 – Fiji vs Uruguay, Kamaishi Recovery Memorial Stadium, Kamaishi, 25 September 2019

== See also ==
- 2023 Rugby World Cup statistics
- Records and statistics of the Rugby World Cup
- List of Rugby World Cup hat-tricks
- List of Rugby World Cup red cards
