= 2019 Rugby World Cup Pool C =

Pool C of the 2019 Rugby World Cup began on 21 September 2019. The pool included previous World Cup hosts England and France, as well as the fourth-placed team from 2015, Argentina. They were joined by regional qualifiers from the Americas, United States (Americas 1), and Oceania, Tonga (Oceania 2), to become the first completed table ahead of the World Cup.

England and France both went unbeaten in their first three matches to guarantee qualification for the knockout stage, but their final match against each other was cancelled due to the effects of Typhoon Hagibis. England had earned a bonus point in all three of their matches, while France had just one, so England went through to the quarter-finals as pool winners. With bonus point victories against Tonga and the United States, Argentina claimed third place and the final automatic qualification spot for the 2023 Rugby World Cup, while Tonga's win over the United States in the final pool match saw them finish fourth.

== Overview ==
Pool C's opening match saw Argentina come back from a 17-point half-time deficit against France at Tokyo Stadium, only for France's Camille Lopez to score a game-winning drop goal in the 70th minute. In Sapporo, two tries from Manu Tuilagi helped England to a bonus-point victory over Tonga. England followed that up with a 38-point victory over the United States, with Joe Cokanasiga scoring two tries in the victory; however, the match was soured by the first red card of the tournament, shown to the United States' John Quill for a shoulder charge to the head of England's Owen Farrell. Argentina bounced back from their defeat by France with a 28–12 victory over Tonga in Higashiōsaka; all of Argentina's scoring happened in the first 28 minutes, including a hat-trick from Julián Montoya as they raced to a 28-point lead before Tonga brought the margin back to 16 with two tries of their own. After Typhoon Mitag almost cancelled the match, the French were inconsistent with errors keeping the United States in the match before three late tries in the second half would secure a 33–9 win in Fukuoka.

In Chōfu, England qualified for the quarter-finals with a 39–10 victory over Argentina with Argentinean player Tomás Lavanini being shown a red card, which forced Argentina down to 14 men as he was forced off due to a high tackle on Owen Farrell's head. France would later join them in qualifying for the knockout stage with a two-point victory over Tonga at Kumamoto Stadium. After conceding the first 17 points of the match, Tonga came back into the match with tries from Sonatane Takulua and Mali Hingano to close the gap to only three points before Romain Ntamack gave the cushion that France needed with two penalties in eight minutes giving France the victory. Argentina would become the first team to finish their matches of the 2019 World Cup, with a 47–17 victory over the United States in Kumagaya. Joaquín Tuculet and Juan Cruz Mallia each scored two tries in the meeting, their first since 2003. After the England–France game was cancelled due to Typhoon Hagibis, Tonga ended their World Cup campaign with a 31–19 victory over the United States. This was due to the Tongan's using their opportunities with them converting into tries and despite the United States being within striking range with three minutes to go, Telusa Veainu converted the match-winning try and a bonus-point victory for Tonga. At the end of the pool stage, it was England winning the group with France finishing in second place.

== Standings ==
Pos	Team	Pld	W	D	L	PF	PA	PD	T	B	Pts	Qualification
1	England	4	3	1	0	119	20	+99	17	3	17	Advanced to the quarter-finals and qualified for the 2023 Rugby World Cup
2	France	4	3	1	0	79	51	+28	9	1	15	Advanced to the quarter-finals and qualified for the 2023 Rugby World Cup
3	Argentina	4	2	0	2	106	91	+15	14	3	11	Eliminated but qualified for 2023 Rugby World Cup
4	Tonga	4	1	0	3	67	105	−38	9	2	6	
5	United States	4	0	0	4	52	156	−104	7	0	0	

== Matches ==
All times are local Japan Standard Time (UTC+09)

=== France vs Argentina ===
21 September 2019
16:15 JST (UTC+09)

France	23–21	Argentina (1 BP)
Try: Fickou 18' c Dupont 22' c Con: Ntamack (2/2) 19', 23'; Pen: Ntamack (2/3) 30', 40+1'; Drop: Lopez (1/1) 70'	Report	Try: Petti 42' c Montoya 54' m Con: Sánchez (1/2) 43'; Pen: Sánchez (1/1) 15'; Urdapilleta (2/2) 61', 69'

Tokyo Stadium, Chōfu
Attendance: 40,004
Referee: Angus Gardner (Australia)

France	Argentina

FB	15	Maxime Médard	(substituted off) 61'
RW	14	Damian Penaud	(substituted off) 68'
OC	13	Virimi Vakatawa
IC	12	Gaël Fickou
LW	11	Yoann Huget
FH	10	Romain Ntamack
SH	9	Antoine Dupont	(substituted off) 73'
N8	8	Gregory Alldritt	(substituted off) 61'
OF	7	Charles Ollivon
BF	6	Wenceslas Lauret
RL	5	Sébastien Vahaamahina
LL	4	Arthur Iturria	(substituted off) 55'
TP	3	Rabah Slimani	(substituted off) 47'
HK	2	Guilhem Guirado (c)	(substituted off) 47'
LP	1	Jefferson Poirot	(substituted off) 68'
Replacements:
HK	16	Camille Chat	(substituted in) 47'
PR	17	Cyril Baille	(substituted in) 68'
PR	18	Demba Bamba	(substituted in) 47'
FL	19	Bernard Le Roux	(substituted in) 55'
N8	20	Louis Picamoles	(substituted in) 61'
SH	21	Maxime Machenaud	(substituted in) 73'
FH	22	Camille Lopez	(substituted in) 68'
FB	23	Thomas Ramos	(substituted in) 61'
Coach:
(France) Jacques Brunel

FB	15	Emiliano Boffelli
RW	14	Matías Moroni
OC	13	Matías Orlando
IC	12	Jerónimo de la Fuente
LW	11	Ramiro Moyano	(substituted off) 47'
FH	10	Nicolás Sánchez	(substituted off) 57'
SH	9	Tomás Cubelli
N8	8	Javier Ortega Desio	(substituted off) 61'
OF	7	Marcos Kremer
BF	6	Pablo Matera (c)
RL	5	Tomás Lavanini	(substituted off) 64'
LL	4	Guido Petti
TP	3	Juan Figallo	(substituted off) 52'
HK	2	Agustín Creevy	(substituted off) 52'
LP	1	Nahuel Tetaz Chaparro	(substituted off) 64'
Replacements:
HK	16	Julián Montoya	(substituted in) 52'
PR	17	Mayco Vivas	(substituted in) 64'
PR	18	Santiago Medrano	(substituted in) 52'
LK	19	Matías Alemanno	(substituted in) 64'
FL	20	Tomás Lezana	(substituted in) 61'
SH	21	Felipe Ezcurra
FH	22	Benjamín Urdapilleta	(substituted in) 57'
FB	23	Santiago Carreras	(substituted in) 47'
Coach:
(Argentina) Mario Ledesma

Player of the Match:
Gaël Fickou (France)

Assistant referees:
Jaco Peyper (South Africa)
Brendon Pickerill (New Zealand)
Television match official:
Marius Jonker (South Africa)

Notes:

- Guido Petti (Argentina) earned his 50th test cap.

=== England vs Tonga ===
22 September 2019
19:15 JST (UTC+09)

(1 BP) England	35–3	Tonga
Try: Tuilagi (2) 24' m, 31' c George 57' c Cowan-Dickie 77' c Con: Farrell (3/4) 33', 58', 78'; Pen: Farrell (3/3) 11', 37', 43'	Report	Pen: Takulua (1/2) 15'

Sapporo Dome, Sapporo
Attendance: 35,923
Referee: Paul Williams (New Zealand)

England	Tonga

FB	15	Elliot Daly
RW	14	Anthony Watson
OC	13	Manu Tuilagi
IC	12	Owen Farrell (c)
LW	11	Jonny May	(substituted off) 52'
FH	10	George Ford	(substituted off) 68'
SH	9	Ben Youngs	(substituted off) 56'
N8	8	Billy Vunipola
OF	7	Sam Underhill	(substituted off) 55'
BF	6	Tom Curry
RL	5	Maro Itoje
LL	4	Courtney Lawes	(substituted off) 56'
TP	3	Kyle Sinckler	(substituted off) 58'
HK	2	Jamie George	(substituted off) 58'
LP	1	Joe Marler	(substituted off) 50'
Replacements:
HK	16	Luke Cowan-Dickie	(substituted in) 58'
PR	17	Ellis Genge	(substituted in) 50'
PR	18	Dan Cole	(substituted in) 58'
LK	19	George Kruis	(substituted in) 56'
FL	20	Lewis Ludlam	(substituted in) 55'
SH	21	Willi Heinz	(substituted in) 56'
CE	22	Henry Slade	(substituted in) 53'
CE	23	Jonathan Joseph	(substituted in) 68'
Coach:
(Australia) Eddie Jones

FB	15	David Halaifonua
RW	14	Atieli Pakalani	(substituted off) 40'
OC	13	Siale Piutau (c)
IC	12	Cooper Vuna
LW	11	Viliami Lolohea
FH	10	Kurt Morath	(substituted off) 50'
SH	9	Sonatane Takulua	(substituted off) 61'
N8	8	Maama Vaipulu	(substituted off) 58'
OF	7	Zane Kapeli
BF	6	Sione Kalamafoni
RL	5	Leva Fifita	(substituted off) 72'
LL	4	Sam Lousi
TP	3	Ben Tameifuna	(substituted off) 50'
HK	2	Sosefo Sakalia	(substituted off) 61'
LP	1	Siegfried Fisiihoi	(substituted off) 63'
Replacements:
HK	16	Siua Maile	(substituted in) 61'
PR	17	Latu Talakai	(substituted in) 63'
PR	18	Maʻafu Fia	(substituted in) 50'
FL	19	Daniel Faleafa	(substituted in) 72'
FL	20	Nasi Manu	(substituted in) 58'
SH	21	Leon Fukofuka	(substituted in) 61'
FH	22	James Faiva	(substituted in) 50'
CE	23	Nafi Tuitavake	(substituted in) 40'
Coach:
(Australia) Toutai Kefu

Player of the Match:
Manu Tuilagi (England)

Assistant referees:
Mathieu Raynal (France)
Shuhei Kubo (Japan)
Television match official:
Ben Skeen (New Zealand)

=== England vs United States ===
26 September 2019
19:45 JST (UTC+09)

(1 BP) England	45–7	United States
Try: Ford 6' c B. Vunipola 25' c Cowan-Dickie 33' m Cokanasiga (2) 48' m, 76' c McConnochie 58' c Ludlam 67' c Con: Ford (5/7) 7', 26', 60', 68', 77'	Report	Try: Campbell 80+1' c Con: MacGinty (1/1) 80+2'

Kobe Misaki Stadium, Kobe
Attendance: 27,194
Referee: Nic Berry (Australia)

England	United States

FB	15	Elliot Daly
RW	14	Ruaridh McConnochie	(substituted off) 61'
OC	13	Jonathan Joseph
IC	12	Piers Francis	(substituted off) 50'
LW	11	Joe Cokanasiga
FH	10	George Ford (c)
SH	9	Willi Heinz	(substituted off) 50'
N8	8	Billy Vunipola	(substituted off) 40'
OF	7	Lewis Ludlam
BF	6	Tom Curry
RL	5	George Kruis
LL	4	Joe Launchbury	(substituted off) 50'
TP	3	Dan Cole	(substituted off) 40'
HK	2	Luke Cowan-Dickie	(substituted off) 69'
LP	1	Joe Marler	(substituted off) 40'
Replacements:
HK	16	Jack Singleton	(substituted in) 69'
PR	17	Ellis Genge	(substituted in) 40'
PR	18	Kyle Sinckler	(substituted in) 40'
LK	19	Courtney Lawes	(substituted in) 50'
FL	20	Mark Wilson	(substituted in) 40'
SH	21	Ben Youngs	(substituted in) 50'
FH	22	Owen Farrell	(substituted in) 50'
WG	23	Anthony Watson	(substituted in) 61'
Coach:
(Australia) Eddie Jones

FB	15	Will Hooley		43' to 53'			(substituted off) 77'
RW	14	Blaine Scully (c)
OC	13	Marcel Brache
IC	12	Paul Lasike		(substituted off) 61'
LW	11	Martin Iosefo				(substituted off) 63'	(substituted in) 77'
FH	10	AJ MacGinty
SH	9	Shaun Davies		(substituted off) 50'
N8	8	Cam Dolan
OF	7	John Quill	(red card) 70'
BF	6	Tony Lamborn		(substituted off) 61'
RL	5	Nick Civetta		(substituted off) 50'
LL	4	Ben Landry
TP	3	Titi Lamositele		(substituted off) 43'
HK	2	Joe Taufete'e		(substituted off) 60'
LP	1	David Ainuu		(substituted off) 3'
Replacements:
HK	16	Dylan Fawsitt		(substituted in) 60'
PR	17	Olive Kilifi		(substituted in) 3'
PR	18	Paul Mullen		(substituted in) 43'
LK	19	Greg Peterson		(substituted in) 50'
FL	20	Hanco Germishuys		(substituted in) 61'
SH	21	Ruben de Haas		(substituted in) 50'
CE	22	Bryce Campbell		(substituted in) 61'
FB	23	Mike Te'o		(substituted in) 43'	(substituted off) 53'	(substituted in) 63'
Coach:
(South Africa) Gary Gold

Player of the Match:
George Ford (England)

Assistant referees:
Paul Williams (New Zealand)
Federico Anselmi (Argentina)
Television match official:
Ben Skeen (New Zealand)

=== Argentina vs Tonga ===
28 September 2019
13:45 JST (UTC+09)

(1 BP) Argentina	28–12	Tonga
Try: Montoya (3) 7' c, 17' c, 26' c Carreras 20' c Con: Urdapilleta (4/4) 9', 19', 21', 28'	Report	Try: Veainu (2) 30' c, 66' m Con: Takulua (1/2) 32'

Hanazono Rugby Stadium, Higashiōsaka
Attendance: 21,971
Referee: Jaco Peyper (South Africa)

Argentina	Tonga

FB	15	Emiliano Boffelli
RW	14	Matías Moroni
OC	13	Matías Orlando	(substituted off) 67'
IC	12	Jerónimo de la Fuente
LW	11	Santiago Carreras
FH	10	Benjamín Urdapilleta	(substituted off) 55'
SH	9	Tomás Cubelli	(substituted off) 73'
N8	8	Tomás Lezana
OF	7	Marcos Kremer
BF	6	Pablo Matera (c)	(substituted off) 45'
RL	5	Tomás Lavanini	(substituted off) 55'
LL	4	Guido Petti
TP	3	Juan Figallo	(substituted off) 45'
HK	2	Julián Montoya	(substituted off) 45'
LP	1	Nahuel Tetaz Chaparro	(substituted off) 45'
Replacements:
HK	16	Agustín Creevy	(substituted in) 45'
PR	17	Mayco Vivas	(substituted in) 45'
PR	18	Santiago Medrano	(substituted in) 45'
LK	19	Matías Alemanno	(substituted in) 55'
N8	20	Javier Ortega Desio	(substituted in) 45'
SH	21	Felipe Ezcurra	(substituted in) 73'
FH	22	Nicolás Sánchez	(substituted in) 55'
WG	23	Bautista Delguy	(substituted in) 67'
Coach:
(Argentina) Mario Ledesma

FB	15	Telusa Veainu	(substituted off) 74'
RW	14	Viliami Lolohea			(substituted off) 43'
OC	13	Mali Hingano
IC	12	Siale Piutau (c)	14' to 25'
LW	11	David Halaifonua
FH	10	James Faiva
SH	9	Sonatane Takulua	(substituted off) 66'
N8	8	Maama Vaipulu
OF	7	Zane Kapeli	(substituted off) 53'
BF	6	Sione Kalamafoni	(substituted off) 66'
RL	5	Leva Fifita
LL	4	Sam Lousi
TP	3	Ben Tameifuna	(substituted off) 40'
HK	2	Paul Ngauamo	(substituted off) 53'
LP	1	Siegfried Fisiihoi	(substituted off) 67'
Replacements:
HK	16	Sosefo Sakalia	(substituted in) 53'
PR	17	Vunipola Fifita	(substituted in) 67'
PR	18	Maʻafu Fia	(substituted in) 40'
LK	19	Steve Mafi	(substituted in) 66'
FL	20	Nasi Manu	(substituted in) 53'
SH	21	Leon Fukofuka	(substituted in) 66'
FH	22	Latiume Fosita	(substituted in) 74'
WG	23	Cooper Vuna	(substituted in) 14'	(substituted off) 25'	(substituted in) 43'
Coach:
(Australia) Toutai Kefu

Player of the Match:
Julián Montoya (Argentina)

Assistant referees:
Ben O'Keeffe (New Zealand)
Brendon Pickerill (New Zealand)
Television match official:
Rowan Kitt (England)

Notes:

- Agustín Creevy levelled Argentina's most capped player record, set by Felipe Contepomi with 87 caps.

=== France vs United States ===
2 October 2019
16:45 JST (UTC+09)

(1 BP) France	33–9	United States
Try: Huget 6' c Raka 24' m Fickou 67' c Serin 70' c Poirot 79' c Con: Ramos (1/2) 8'; Lopez (3/3) 68', 71', 80'+1	Report	Pen: MacGinty (3/3) 19', 31', 65'

Fukuoka Hakatanomori Stadium, Fukuoka
Attendance: 17,660
Referee: Ben O'Keeffe (New Zealand)

France	United States

FB	15	Thomas Ramos	(substituted off) 57'
RW	14	Alivereti Raka
OC	13	Sofiane Guitoune	(substituted off) 76'
IC	12	Gaël Fickou
LW	11	Yoann Huget
FH	10	Camille Lopez
SH	9	Maxime Machenaud	(substituted off) 65'
N8	8	Louis Picamoles (c)
OF	7	Yacouba Camara
BF	6	Arthur Iturria	(substituted off) 65'
RL	5	Paul Gabrillagues	(substituted off) 57'
LL	4	Bernard Le Roux
TP	3	Emerick Setiano	(substituted off) 45'
HK	2	Camille Chat	(substituted off) 40'
LP	1	Cyril Baille	(substituted off) 45'
Replacements:
HK	16	Guilhem Guirado	(substituted in) 40'
PR	17	Jefferson Poirot	(substituted in) 45'
PR	18	Rabah Slimani	(substituted in) 45'
LK	19	Sébastien Vahaamahina	(substituted in) 57'
FL	20	Grégory Alldritt	(substituted in) 65'
SH	21	Baptiste Serin	(substituted in) 65'
FH	22	Romain Ntamack	(substituted in) 76'
FB	23	Maxime Médard	(substituted in) 57'
Coach:
(France) Jacques Brunel

FB	15	Mike Te'o
RW	14	Blaine Scully (c)
OC	13	Marcel Brache
IC	12	Bryce Campbell
LW	11	Martin Iosefo	(substituted off) 72'
FH	10	AJ MacGinty	(substituted off) 78'
SH	9	Shaun Davies	(substituted off) 54'
N8	8	Cam Dolan
OF	7	Hanco Germishuys
BF	6	Tony Lamborn	(substituted off) 58'
RL	5	Nick Civetta
LL	4	Nate Brakeley	(substituted off) 69'
TP	3	Titi Lamositele	(substituted off) 54'
HK	2	Joe Taufete'e	(substituted off) 65'
LP	1	Eric Fry	(substituted off) 69'
Replacements:
HK	16	Dylan Fawsitt	(substituted in) 65'
PR	17	Olive Kilifi	(substituted in) 69'
PR	18	Paul Mullen	(substituted in) 54'
LK	19	Greg Peterson	(substituted in) 69'
FL	20	Ben Pinkelman	(substituted in) 58'
SH	21	Ruben de Haas	(substituted in) 54'
FH	22	Will Magie	(substituted in) 78'
CE	23	Thretton Palamo	(substituted in) 72'
Coach:
(South Africa) Gary Gold

Player of the Match:
Camille Lopez (France)

Assistant referees:
Wayne Barnes (England)
Shuhei Kubo (Japan)
Television match official:
Rowan Kitt (England)

Notes:

- Gaël Fickou (France) earned his 50th test cap.

=== England vs Argentina ===
5 October 2019
17:00 JST (UTC+09)

(1 BP) England	39–10	Argentina
Try: May 9' m Daly 35' m Youngs 40'+1 m Ford 45' c Nowell 74' c Cowan-Dickie 80' c Con: Farrell (3/6) 47', 76', 80+1'; Pen: Farrell (1/2) 54'	Report	Try: Moroni 71' c Con: Boffelli (1/1) 72'; Pen: Urdapilleta (1/1) 7'

Tokyo Stadium, Chōfu
Attendance: 48,185
Referee: Nigel Owens (Wales)

England	Argentina

FB	15	Elliot Daly
RW	14	Anthony Watson	(substituted off) 69'
OC	13	Manu Tuilagi
IC	12	Owen Farrell (c)
LW	11	Jonny May
FH	10	George Ford	(substituted off) 69'
SH	9	Ben Youngs	(substituted off) 47'
N8	8	Billy Vunipola	(substituted off) 40'
OF	7	Sam Underhill
BF	6	Tom Curry
RL	5	George Kruis	(substituted off) 55'
LL	4	Maro Itoje
TP	3	Kyle Sinckler	(substituted off) 63'
HK	2	Jamie George	(substituted off) 65'
LP	1	Joe Marler	(substituted off) 63'
Replacements:
HK	16	Luke Cowan-Dickie	(substituted in) 65'
PR	17	Mako Vunipola	(substituted in) 63'
PR	18	Dan Cole	(substituted in) 63'
LK	19	Courtney Lawes	(substituted in) 55'
FL	20	Lewis Ludlam	(substituted in) 40'
SH	21	Willi Heinz	(substituted in) 47'
CE	22	Henry Slade	(substituted in) 69'
WG	23	Jack Nowell	(substituted in) 69'
Coach:
(Australia) Eddie Jones

FB	15	Emiliano Boffelli
RW	14	Matías Moroni
OC	13	Matías Orlando		(substituted off) 56'
IC	12	Jerónimo de la Fuente
LW	11	Santiago Carreras
FH	10	Benjamín Urdapilleta		(substituted off) 61'
SH	9	Tomás Cubelli		(substituted off) 59'
N8	8	Javier Ortega Desio		(substituted off) 49'
OF	7	Marcos Kremer
BF	6	Pablo Matera (c)
RL	5	Tomás Lavanini	(red card) 19'
LL	4	Guido Petti		(substituted off) 54'
TP	3	Juan Figallo		(substituted off) 49'
HK	2	Julián Montoya		(substituted off) 49'
LP	1	Nahuel Tetaz Chaparro		(substituted off) 49'
Replacements:
HK	16	Agustín Creevy		(substituted in) 49'
PR	17	Mayco Vivas		(substituted in) 49'
PR	18	Santiago Medrano		(substituted in) 49'
LK	19	Matías Alemanno		(substituted in) 54'
FL	20	Tomás Lezana		(substituted in) 49'
SH	21	Felipe Ezcurra		(substituted in) 59'
CE	22	Lucas Mensa		(substituted in) 61'
WG	23	Bautista Delguy		(substituted in) 56'
Coach:
(Argentina) Mario Ledesma

Player of the Match:
Sam Underhill (England)

Assistant referees:
Ben O'Keeffe (New Zealand)
Andrew Brace (Ireland)
Television match official:
Marius Jonker (South Africa)

Notes:

- Agustín Creevy became the most capped player for Argentina with 88 caps, surpassing Felipe Contepomi's record of 87.
- Tomás Lavanini's red card was a record fifth for a World Cup, surpassing the four given out in 1995 and 1999.
- With this loss for Argentina and France's win on the 6 October, Argentina fail to advance through to the knock-out stage of the World Cup for the first time since 2003.
- Angus Gardner was due to be part of the officiating team for this game, but swapped with Ben O'Keeffe's appointment between Japan and Samoa.

=== France vs Tonga ===
6 October 2019
16:45 JST (UTC+09)

France	23–21	Tonga (1 BP)
Try: Vakatawa 6' c Raka 32' c Con: Ntamack (2/2) 7', 34'; Pen: Ntamack (3/4) 4', 52', 60'	Report	Try: Takulua 40' c Hingano 47' c Kapeli 79' c Con: Takulua (2/2) 40'+1, 49'; Fosita (1/1) 80'

Kumamoto Stadium, Kumamoto
Attendance: 28,477
Referee: Nic Berry (Australia)

France	Tonga

FB	15	Maxime Médard
RW	14	Damian Penaud
OC	13	Virimi Vakatawa	(substituted off) 67'
IC	12	Sofiane Guitoune
LW	11	Alivereti Raka
FH	10	Romain Ntamack	(substituted off) 67'
SH	9	Baptiste Serin	(substituted off) 54'
N8	8	Gregory Alldritt	(substituted off) 62'
OF	7	Charles Ollivon
BF	6	Wenceslas Lauret
RL	5	Sébastien Vahaamahina	(substituted off) 53'
LL	4	Paul Gabrillagues
TP	3	Rabah Slimani	(substituted off) 53'
HK	2	Camille Chat	(substituted off) 60'
LP	1	Jefferson Poirot (c)	(substituted off) 53'
Replacements:
HK	16	Guilhem Guirado	(substituted in) 60'
PR	17	Cyril Baille	(substituted in) 53'
PR	18	Emerick Setiano	(substituted in) 53'
FL	19	Bernard Le Roux	(substituted in) 53'
FL	20	Yacouba Camara	(substituted in) 62'
SH	21	Antoine Dupont	(substituted in) 54'
FH	22	Camille Lopez	(substituted in) 67'
CE	23	Pierre-Louis Barassi	(substituted in) 66'
Coach:
(France) Jacques Brunel

FB	15	Telusa Veainu
RW	14	Cooper Vuna
OC	13	Mali Hingano
IC	12	Siale Piutau (c)
LW	11	David Halaifonua	(substituted off) 67'
FH	10	James Faiva	(substituted off) 67'
SH	9	Sonatane Takulua	(substituted off) 60'
N8	8	Maama Vaipulu	(substituted off) 62'
OF	7	Zane Kapeli
BF	6	Sione Kalamafoni
RL	5	Leva Fifita	(substituted off) 61'	(substituted off) 70'
LL	4	Sam Lousi			(substituted off) 72'
TP	3	Maʻafu Fia	(substituted off) 40'
HK	2	Paul Ngauamo	(substituted off) 57'	(substituted in) 62'
LP	1	Siegfried Fisiihoi	(substituted off) 65'
Replacements:
HK	16	Sosefo Sakalia	(substituted in) 57'	(substituted off) 62'
PR	17	Vunipola Fifita	(substituted in) 65'
PR	18	Siua Halanukonuka	(substituted in) 40'
FL	19	Daniel Faleafa	(substituted in) 61'	(substituted off) 70'	(substituted in) 72'
N8	20	Nasi Manu	(substituted in) 62'
SH	21	Leon Fukofuka	(substituted in) 60'
FH	22	Latiume Fosita	(substituted in) 67'
WG	23	Atieli Pakalani	(substituted in) 67'
Coach:
(Australia) Toutai Kefu

Player of the Match:
Alivereti Raka (France)

Assistant referees:
Paul Williams (New Zealand)
Matthew Carley (England)
Television match official:
Ben Skeen (New Zealand)

Notes:

- Pierre-Louis Barassi (France) made his international debut.

=== Argentina vs United States ===
9 October 2019
13:45 JST (UTC+09)

(1 BP) Argentina	47–17	United States
Try: Sánchez 19' c Tuculet (2) 25' c, 35' m Mallia (2) 44' c, 48' c de la Fuente 57' c Bertranou 71' c Con: Sánchez (5/6) 21', 25', 45', 49', 57'; Urdapilleta (1/1) 72'	Report	Try: Scully (2) 39' m, 80+3' m Lasike 60' c Con: MacGinty (1/2) 61'

Kumagaya Rugby Stadium, Kumagaya
Attendance: 24,377
Referee: Paul Williams (New Zealand)

Argentina	United States

FB	15	Joaquín Tuculet
RW	14	Bautista Delguy
OC	13	Juan Cruz Mallia
IC	12	Jerónimo de la Fuente	(substituted off) 61'
LW	11	Santiago Carreras
FH	10	Nicolás Sánchez	(substituted off) 60'
SH	9	Felipe Ezcurra	(substituted off) 57'
N8	8	Rodrigo Bruni
OF	7	Juan Manuel Leguizamón
BF	6	Pablo Matera (c)	(substituted off) 50'
RL	5	Matías Alemanno
LL	4	Guido Petti	(substituted off) 58'
TP	3	Santiago Medrano	(substituted off) 53'
HK	2	Julián Montoya	(substituted off) 53'
LP	1	Nahuel Tetaz Chaparro	(substituted off) 53'
Replacements:
HK	16	Agustín Creevy	(substituted in) 53'
PR	17	Mayco Vivas	(substituted in) 53'
PR	18	Enrique Pieretto	(substituted in) 53'
FL	19	Marcos Kremer	(substituted in) 50'
FL	20	Tomás Lezana	(substituted in) 58'
SH	21	Gonzalo Bertranou	(substituted in) 57'
FH	22	Benjamín Urdapilleta	(substituted in) 60'
CE	23	Matías Moroni	(substituted in) 61'
Coach:
(Argentina) Mario Ledesma

FB	15	Mike Te'o	(substituted off) 50'
RW	14	Blaine Scully (c)
OC	13	Bryce Campbell
IC	12	Paul Lasike	3' to 8'
LW	11	Marcel Brache
FH	10	AJ MacGinty			(substituted off) 73'
SH	9	Ruben de Haas	(substituted off) 60'
N8	8	Cam Dolan
OF	7	Hanco Germishuys
BF	6	Tony Lamborn	(substituted off) 57'
RL	5	Greg Peterson
LL	4	Nate Brakeley	(substituted off) 57'
TP	3	Titi Lamositele	(substituted off) 50'
HK	2	Joe Taufete'e	(substituted off) 50'
LP	1	Eric Fry	(substituted off) 50'
Replacements:
HK	16	Dylan Fawsitt	(substituted in) 50'
PR	17	Olive Kilifi	(substituted in) 50'
PR	18	Paul Mullen	(substituted in) 50'
LK	19	Ben Landry	(substituted in) 57'
FL	20	Ben Pinkelman	(substituted in) 57'
SH	21	Nate Augspurger	(substituted in) 60'
FB	22	Will Hooley	(substituted in) 50'
WG	23	Martin Iosefo	(substituted in) 3'	(substituted off) 8'	(substituted in) 73'
Coach:
(South Africa) Gary Gold

Player of the Match:
Juan Cruz Mallia (Argentina)

Assistant referees:
Jaco Peyper (South Africa)
Brendon Pickerill (New Zealand)
Television match official:
Graham Hughes (England)

Notes:

- Cam Dolan (United States) earned his 50th test cap.

=== England vs France ===
12 October 2019
17:15 JST (UTC+09)

England	0–0 (Cancelled)	France

International Stadium Yokohama, Yokohama
Referee: Jaco Peyper (South Africa)

Assistant referees:
Nigel Owens (Wales)
Andrew Brace (Ireland)
Television match official:
Ben Skeen (New Zealand)

Notes:

- As a result of inclement weather caused by Typhoon Hagibis this match was cancelled and awarded as a 0–0 draw.

=== United States vs Tonga ===
13 October 2019
14:45 JST (UTC+09)

United States	19–31	Tonga (1 BP)
Try: Te'o (2) 21' c, 26' m Lamborn 77' c Con: MacGinty (2/3) 22', 78'	Report	Try: Fisiihoi 17' c Hingano 58' c Piutau 62' c Veainu 80'+1 c Con: Takulua (2/2) 19', 60'; Faiva (1/1) 64'; Piutau (1/1) 80+2'; Pen: Takulua (1/1) 51'

Hanazono Rugby Stadium, Higashiōsaka
Attendance: 22,012
Referee: Nigel Owens (Wales)

United States	Tonga

FB	15	Will Hooley
RW	14	Blaine Scully (c)	(substituted off) 20'
OC	13	Bryce Campbell
IC	12	Paul Lasike
LW	11	Marcel Brache
FH	10	AJ MacGinty
SH	9	Ruben de Haas	(substituted off) 66'
N8	8	Cam Dolan	(substituted off) 52'
OF	7	Malon Al-Jiboori	(substituted off) 66'
BF	6	Tony Lamborn
RL	5	Nick Civetta
LL	4	Greg Peterson	(substituted off) 46'
TP	3	Titi Lamositele	(substituted off) 46'
HK	2	Joe Taufete'e	(substituted off) 73'
LP	1	Eric Fry	(substituted off) 19'
Replacements:
HK	16	James Hilterbrand	(substituted in) 73'
PR	17	Olive Kilifi	(substituted in) 19'
PR	18	Paul Mullen	(substituted in) 46'
LK	19	Ben Landry	(substituted in) 46'
FL	20	Hanco Germishuys	(substituted in) 52'
FL	21	Ben Pinkelman	(substituted in) 66'
SH	22	Nate Augspurger	(substituted in) 66'
FB	23	Mike Te'o	(substituted in) 20'
Coach:
(South Africa) Gary Gold

FB	15	Telusa Veainu
RW	14	Atieli Pakalani
OC	13	Mali Hingano
IC	12	Siale Piutau (c)
LW	11	Viliami Lolohea	(substituted off) 49'
FH	10	James Faiva	(substituted off) 76'
SH	9	Sonatane Takulua	(substituted off) 60'
N8	8	Maama Vaipulu
OF	7	Zane Kapeli	(substituted off) 60'
BF	6	Sione Kalamafoni
RL	5	Leva Fifita	(substituted off) 76'
LL	4	Sam Lousi
TP	3	Siua Halanukonuka	(substituted off) 45'
HK	2	Paul Ngauamo	(substituted off) 76'
LP	1	Siegfried Fisiihoi	(substituted off) 66'
Replacements:
HK	16	Siua Maile	(substituted in) 76'
PR	17	Vunipola Fifita	(substituted in) 66'
PR	18	Maʻafu Fia	(substituted in) 45'
FL	19	Daniel Faleafa	(substituted in) 76'
N8	20	Nasi Manu	(substituted in) 60'
SH	21	Leon Fukofuka	(substituted in) 60'
FH	22	Latiume Fosita	(substituted in) 76'
FB	23	David Halaifonua	(substituted in) 49'
Coach:
(Australia) Toutai Kefu

Player of the Match:
Siale Piutau (Tonga)

Assistant referees:
Wayne Barnes (England)
Alexandre Ruiz (France)
Television match official:
Graham Hughes (England)
