= Hingano =

Hingano is a surname. Notable people with the surname include:

- Ata Hingano (born 1997), Tongan international rugby league footballer
- Mali Hingano (born 1992), Australian-born Tongan rugby union player
- Viliami Hingano (1975–2022), Tongan politician
