= 2019 Rugby World Cup =

Ninth edition of the Rugby World Cup

Japanese: ラグビーワールドカップ2019
- Once In A Lifetime.

Tournament details
- Host nation: Japan
- Venue: 12 (in 12 host cities)
- Dates: 20 September – 2 November
- No. of nations: 20 (97 qualifying)

Final positions
- Champions: South Africa (3rd title)
- Runner-up: England
- Third place: New Zealand

Tournament statistics
- Matches played: 45
- Attendance: 1,698,528 (37,745 per match)
- Tries scored: 285 (average 6.33 per match)
- Top scorer(s): (South Africa) Handré Pollard (69)
- Most tries: (Wales) Josh Adams (7)
- Points scored: 2,196 (average 48.8 per match)

The 2019 Rugby World Cup (Japanese: ラグビーワールドカップ2019) was the ninth edition of the Rugby World Cup, the quadrennial world championship for men's rugby union teams. It was hosted in Japan from 20 September to 2 November in 12 venues all across the country. The opening match was played at Ajinomoto Stadium in Chōfu, Tokyo, with the final match being held at International Stadium Yokohama in Yokohama. This was the first time that the tournament had taken place in Asia and outside the traditional Tier 1 rugby nations.

The tournament saw the first cancellation of matches at the Rugby World Cup with Typhoon Hagibis affecting three matches due to the expected impact on safety that the typhoon would have.

South Africa beat England 32−12 in the final to claim their third title, equalling New Zealand's record. In doing so, South Africa became the first team to win the title after losing a match in the pool stage. The two time defending champions, New Zealand, finished third after defeating Wales in the bronze final.

== Host country selection ==
The International Rugby Board (IRB) requested that any members wishing to host the 2015 Rugby World Cup and/or the 2019 event should indicate their interest by 15 August 2008, though no details had to be provided at that stage. A record 10 unions responded, with the 2019 tournament of interest to nine nations. Russia initially announced plans to bid for both events, but withdrew both in February 2009 in favour of what proved to be a successful bid for the 2013 Rugby World Cup Sevens. Australia withdrew from the bidding process on 6 May 2009.

The three potential hosts – Italy, Japan and South Africa – were announced on 8 May 2009. At a special meeting held in Dublin on 28 July 2009, the IRB confirmed that England would be hosts in 2015 and Japan in 2019, with the approval of the tournament organisers Rugby World Cup Ltd (RWC Ltd), going in favour 16–10.

== Venues ==
The IRB (which was renamed World Rugby in November 2014), RWC Ltd, the Japan Rugby Football Union (JRFU) and host organisers Japan 2019 went through a process of asking for expressions of interest and meeting with and explaining game hosting requirements to interested parties from late 2013. In May 2014, it was announced that 22 municipal and prefectural organisations across Japan had expressed interest. Those organisations were asked to enter formal bids by 31 October 2014. On 5 November, organisers announced that 14 bids had been received. Hong Kong and Singapore had expressed interest in hosting some of the matches and were included in Japan's bid, but were not among the 14 stadiums announced in 2014. Nissan Stadium in Yokohama, venue for the 2002 FIFA World Cup Final and Niigata's Denka Big Swan Stadium, also a World Cup venue, decided not to bid.

Several changes to the venues submitted in the JRFU's original 2009 bid were made. The JRFU's own Chichibunomiya Stadium in Tokyo, suitable for smaller interest games in the capital, was not included in the plan. The JRFU selected the larger and more modern 50,000-seat Nagai multi-purpose stadium as its preferred venue for games in Osaka, though East Osaka City, which had taken over the Hanazono Rugby Stadium from long-time corporate owners Kintetsu in April 2015, submitted a joint bid with Osaka Municipality, intending to refurbish the stadium. Kamaishi, Hamamatsu, Kyoto, Ōita, Nagasaki and Kumamoto were also not part of the JRFU's bid. While the bids included venues from a broad area of Japan, two areas were not involved in hosting: Hokushin'etsu (Hokuriku and Kōshin'etsu regions), which includes the city of Niigata; and the Chūgoku region, which includes Hiroshima and the nearby island of Shikoku. No city in Chūgoku hosted games at the 2002 FIFA World Cup, but Hiroshima did host games in the 2006 FIBA World Championship.

The new National Stadium in Tokyo being constructed for the 2020 Summer Olympics was expected to be the primary venue of the tournament. However, the original plans were scrapped and rebid in 2015 due to criticism over its design and increasing costs. As a consequence, it would no longer be completed in time. The fixtures assigned to the stadium were re-located, with the opening match moved to Ajinomoto Stadium and the final moved to Nissan Stadium in Yokohama.

Yokohama	Hamamatsu (Fukuroi)	Tokyo (Chōfu)	Nagoya (Toyota City)	Sapporo
International Stadium Yokohama	Shizuoka Stadium Ecopa	Tokyo Stadium	City of Toyota Stadium	Sapporo Dome
Capacity: 72,327	Capacity: 50,889	Capacity: 49,970	Capacity: 45,000	Capacity: 41,410
Ōita	2019 Rugby World Cup is located in Japan			Kobe
Oita Stadium	2019 Rugby World Cup is located in Japan			Kobe Misaki Stadium
Capacity: 40,000	2019 Rugby World Cup is located in Japan			Capacity: 30,132
Osaka (Higashiosaka)	Kumamoto	Kumagaya	Fukuoka	Kamaishi
Hanazono Rugby Stadium	Kumamoto Stadium	Kumagaya Rugby Stadium	Fukuoka Hakatanom ori Stadium	Kamaishi Recovery Memorial Stadium
Capacity: 24,100	Capacity: 32,000	Capacity: 24,000	Capacity: 20,049	Capacity: 16,020

== Qualifying ==
Qualification illustrated

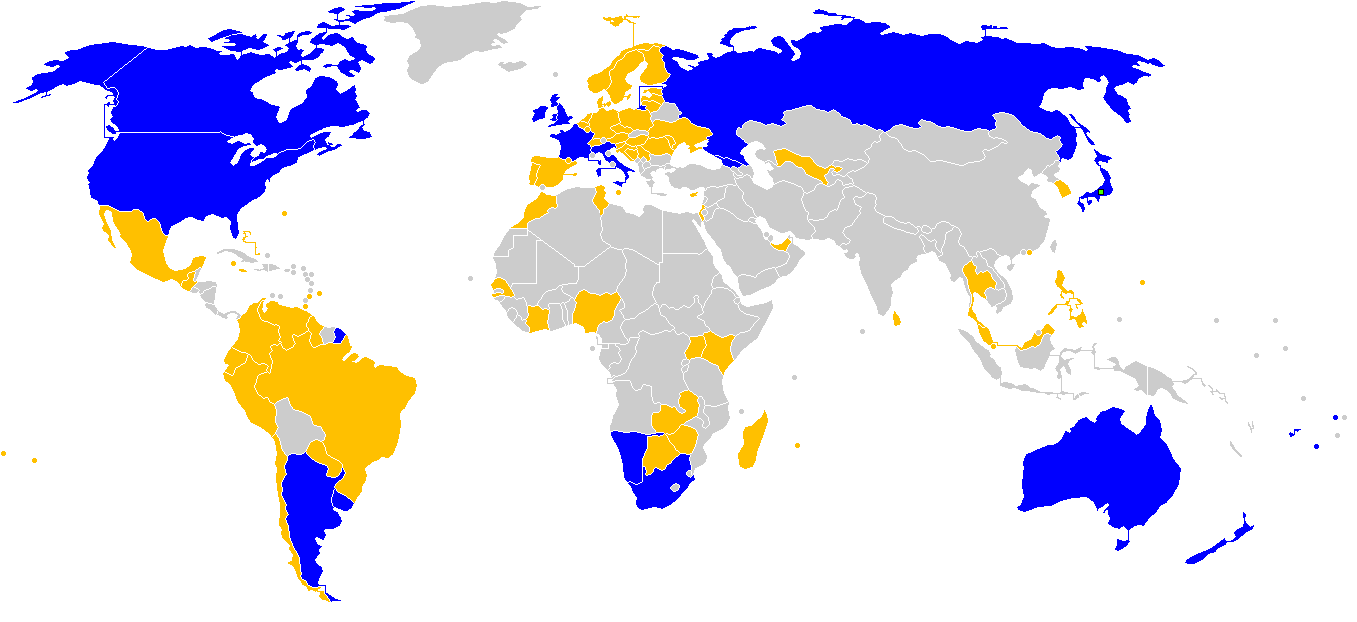
Qualified Did not qualify Did not enter or not a World Rugby full member

The top three teams from the pools at the 2015 World Cup received an automatic spot, with the remaining eight teams coming from the qualifying series around the world. Six of the remaining eight spots available were filled by regional qualifiers with the additional two spots being filled in play-off. Qualifying was split into five regional groups; Africa, Americas, Asia, Europe and Oceania.

On 1 July 2017, the United States became the first team to qualify after defeating Canada in the two-leg match to qualify as America 1. The following two weeks saw Fiji and Tonga booking their spots as Oceania 1 and 2 respectively. Samoa later confirmed their spot as the third Oceanic team with a win over Germany in a two-legged tie the following year. In January 2018, Uruguay became the fourth team to qualify with a 10-point victory over Canada across the two legs to book a spot as Americas 2.

In March, Romania initially qualified to take the spot as Europe 1. But after complaints from the Spanish into an investigation of ineligible players, it was deemed that Romania, Spain and Belgium all broke the eligibility rules and were deducted points which meant Russia qualified for the World Cup while Germany headed to the play-off against Samoa. In August, Namibia became the final team to qualify from the continental tournaments after defeating Kenya in the final round of the Rugby Africa Gold Cup. The final spot was decided by a repechage tournament in Marseille in November 2018, which was won by Canada after winning all three of their games.

Qualifying teams
Region	Team	Qualification method	Previous Apps	Previous best result	World Ranking^{1}
Africa	South Africa	Top 3 in 2015 RWC pool	6	Champions (1995, 2007)	4
Africa	Namibia	Africa 1	5	Pool stage	23
Americas North	United States	Americas 1	7	Pool stage	13
Americas North	Canada	Final Qualifier	7	Quarter-finals	22
Asia	Japan	Hosts	8	Pool stage	10
Europe	England	Top 3 in 2015 RWC pool	8	Champions (2003)	3
Europe	France	Top 3 in 2015 RWC pool	8	Runners-up (1987, 1999, 2011)	8
Europe	Georgia	Top 3 in 2015 RWC pool	4	Pool stage	12
Europe	Ireland	Top 3 in 2015 RWC pool	8	Quarter-finals (six times)	1
Europe	Italy	Top 3 in 2015 RWC pool	8	Pool stage	14
Europe	Russia	Europe 1	1	Pool stage	20
Europe	Scotland	Top 3 in 2015 RWC pool	8	Fourth place (1991)	7
Europe	Wales	Top 3 in 2015 RWC pool	8	Third place (1987)	5
Oceania	Australia	Top 3 in 2015 RWC pool	8	Champions (1991, 1999)	6
Oceania	Fiji	Oceania 1	7	Quarter-finals (1987, 2007)	9
Oceania	New Zealand	Top 3 in 2015 RWC pool	8	Champions (1987, 2011, 2015)	2
Oceania	Samoa	Play-off winner	7	Quarter-finals (1991, 1995)	16
Oceania	Tonga	Oceania 2	7	Pool stage	15
Sudamérica	Argentina	Top 3 in 2015 RWC pool	8	Third place (2007)	11
Sudamérica	Uruguay	Americas 2	3	Pool stage	19

== Draw ==
The pool draw took place on 10 May 2017, in Kyoto. The draw was moved from its traditional place of December in the year following the previous World Cup, after the November internationals, so that nations had a longer period of time to increase their world rankings ahead of the draw.

The seeding system from previous Rugby World Cups was retained with the 12 automatic qualifiers from 2015 being allocated to their respective bands based on their World Rugby Rankings on the day of the draw:

- Band 1: The four highest-ranked teams
- Band 2: The next four highest-ranked teams
- Band 3: The final four directly qualified teams

The remaining two bands were made up of the eight qualifying teams, with allocation to each band being based on the previous Rugby World Cup playing strength:

- Band 4: – Oceania 1, Americas 1, Europe 1, Africa 1
- Band 5: – Oceania 2, Americas 2, Play-off Winner, Repechage Winner

This meant the 20 teams, qualified and qualifiers, were seeded thus (world ranking as of 10 May 2017):

Band 1	Band 2	Band 3	Band 4	Band 5
New Zealand (1); England (2); Australia (3); Ireland (4)	Scotland (5); France (6); South Africa (7); Wales (8)	Argentina (9); Japan (11); Georgia (12); Italy (15)	Fiji (Oceania 1); United States (Americas 1); Russia (Europe 1); Namibia (Africa 1)	Tonga (Oceania 2); Uruguay (Americas 2); Samoa (Play-off); Canada (Repechage)

The draw saw a representative randomly draw a ball from a pot; the first drawn ball went to Pool A, the second Pool B, the third Pool C and the fourth Pool D.

== Squads ==
Each team submitted a squad of 31 players for the tournament, the same as the 2015 tournament. These squads were to be submitted to World Rugby with the deadline being 8 September with the United States being the last team to reveal their squad on 6 September.

== Match officials ==
World Rugby named the following 12 referees, seven assistant referees and four television match officials to handle the 48 matches:

Referees

- Wayne Barnes (England)
- Luke Pearce (England)
- Jérôme Garcès (France)
- Romain Poite (France)
- Pascal Gaüzère (France)
- Mathieu Raynal (France)
- Nigel Owens (Wales)
- Jaco Peyper (South Africa)
- Ben O'Keeffe (New Zealand)
- Paul Williams (New Zealand)
- Nic Berry (Australia)
- Angus Gardner (Australia)

Assistant referees

- Matthew Carley (England)
- Karl Dickson (England)
- Andrew Brace (Ireland)
- Brendon Pickerill (New Zealand)
- Federico Anselmi (Argentina)
- Shuhei Kubo (Japan)
- Alexandre Ruiz (France)

Television match officials

- Graham Hughes (England)
- Rowan Kitt (England)
- Ben Skeen (New Zealand)
- Marius Jonker (South Africa)

== Opening ceremony ==
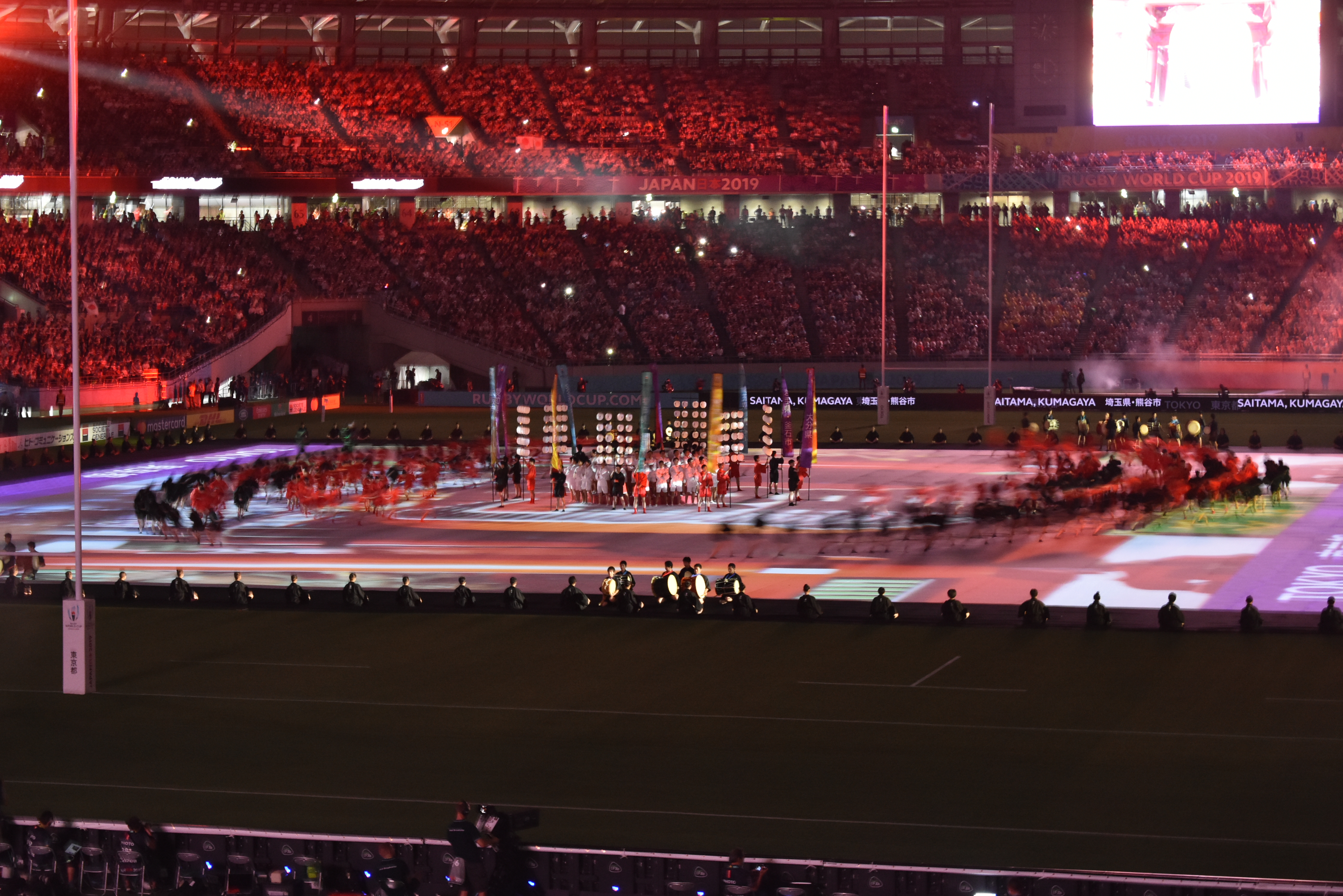
Dancers at the opening ceremony

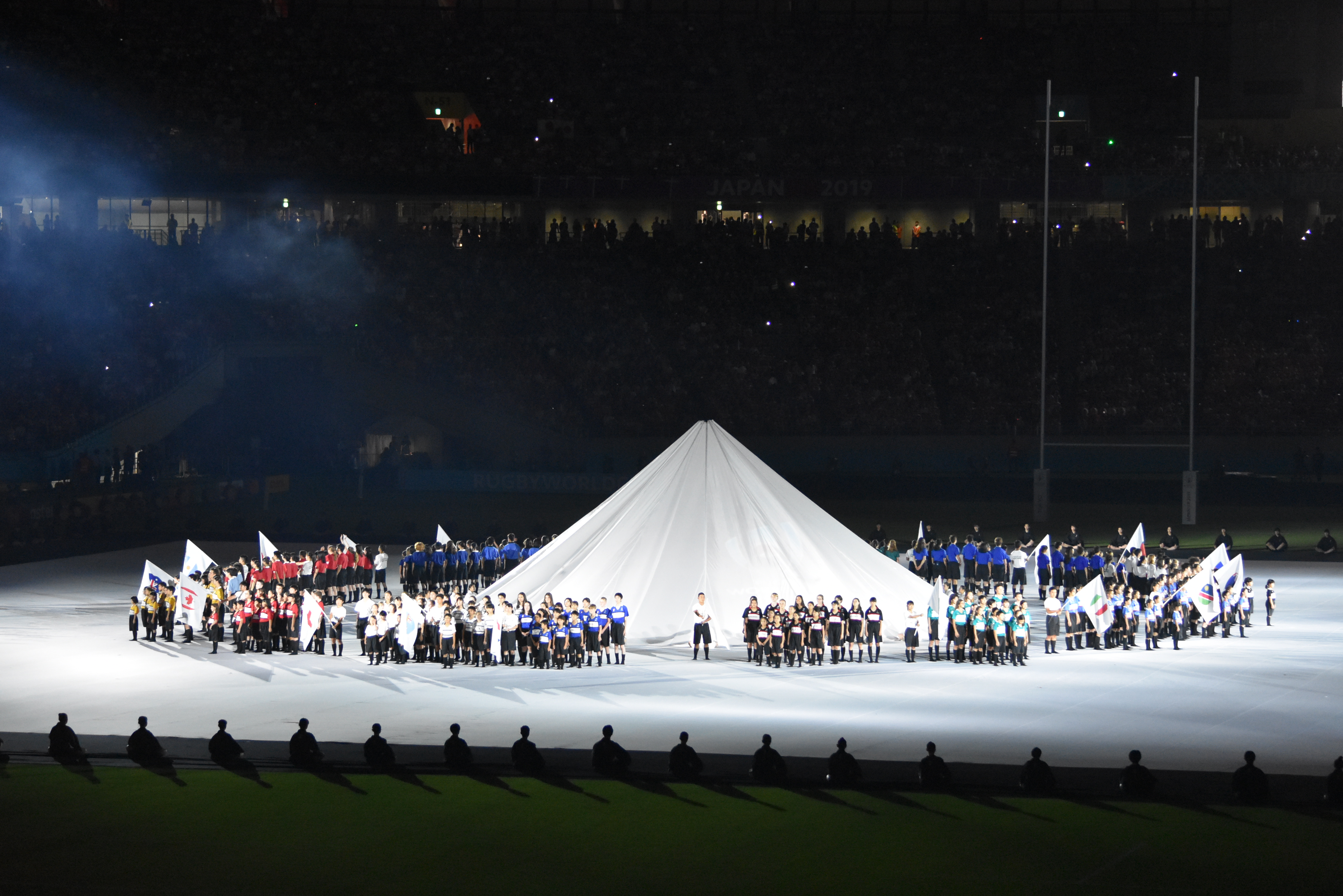
A model of Mount Fuji at the opening ceremony with the teams in the finals being introduced

The opening ceremony took place at Ajinomoto Stadium in Tokyo on 20 September 2019 at 18:30 (JST). The ceremony featured a showcase of traditional and modern Japanese culture, as well as the culture of rugby union, and told the story of the evolution of rugby union in Japan. New Zealand's Richie McCaw, who captained the All Blacks to the World Cup title in 2015, performed a ceremonial handover of the Webb Ellis Cup. Six jet aircraft of the Japan Air Self-Defense Force's Blue Impulse aerobatic team flew over the stadium. Kiyoe Yoshioka of Japanese pop-rock band Ikimono-gakari sang World in Union, the official song of the Rugby World Cup. The tournament was officially declared open by Fumihito, Prince Akishino of Japan; both he and World Rugby chairman Sir Bill Beaumont gave speeches at the end of the ceremony, with Beaumont saying:

"Over the next six weeks we will experience the very best of rugby and the very best of Japan as excitement sweeps this great nation. I know Japan will be the most welcoming of hosts, you are the best. The waiting is over and the stage is set. It's now over to the teams and the fans to make this the best World Cup ever."

== Pool stage ==
The 20 teams are divided into four pools of five teams. Each pool is a single round-robin of 10 games, in which each team plays one match against each of the other teams in the same pool. Teams are awarded four league points for a win, two for a draw and none for a defeat. A team scoring four tries in a match is awarded a bonus point, as is a team that loses by seven points or fewer – both bonus points are awarded if both situations apply. The teams finishing in the top two of each pool advance to the quarter-finals. The top three teams of each pool received automatic qualification to the 2023 Rugby World Cup.

Tie-breaking criteria

If two or more teams are tied on match points, the following tiebreakers apply:

1. The winner of the match between the two teams
2. Difference between points scored for and points scored against in all pool matches
3. Difference between tries scored for and tries scored against in all pool matches
4. Points scored in all pool matches
5. Most tries scored in all pool matches
6. Official World Rugby Rankings as of 14 October 2019

If three teams were tied on points, the above criteria would be used to decide first place in the pool and then the criteria would be used again (starting from criterion 1) to decide second place in the pool.

Key to colours in pool tables
Advanced to the quarter-finals and qualified for the 2023 Men's Rugby World Cup
Eliminated but qualified for 2023 Men's Rugby World Cup

=== Pool A ===
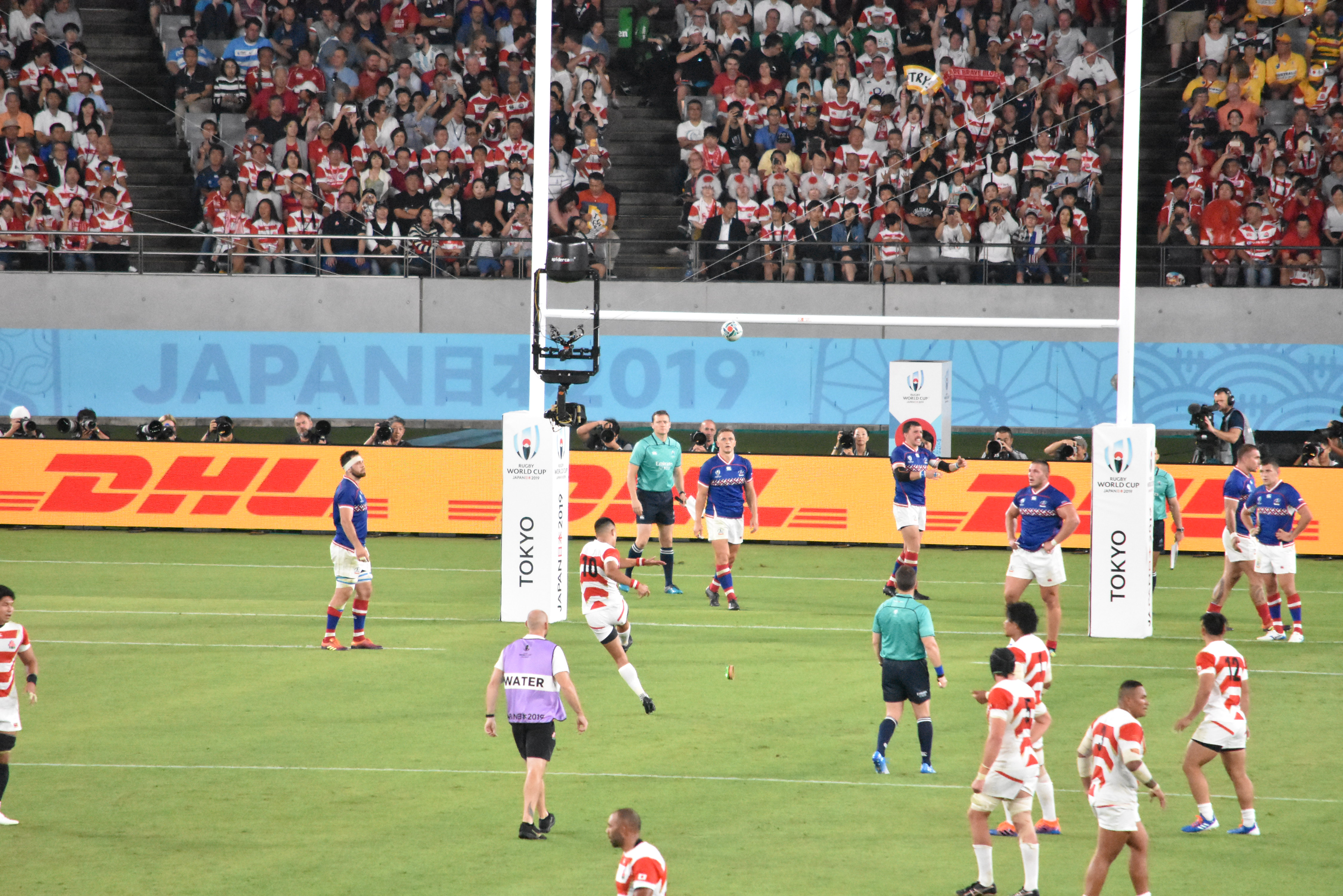
Japan taking on Russia at Tokyo Stadium, Chōfu.

Pos	Team	Pld	W	D	L	PF	PA	PD	T	B	Pts
1	Japan	4	4	0	0	115	62	+53	13	3	19
2	Ireland	4	3	0	1	121	27	+94	18	4	16
3	Scotland	4	2	0	2	119	55	+64	16	3	11
4	Samoa	4	1	0	3	58	128	−70	8	1	5
5	Russia	4	0	0	4	19	160	−141	1	0	0

The opening match of the 2019 Rugby World Cup was played in Pool A with Japan scoring a 30–10 win over Russia. Kotaro Matsushima became the first Japanese player to score a hat-trick at a World Cup. For the Russian side, Kirill Golosnitsky scored the first try of the tournament after four minutes – the fastest try ever scored in the opening match of a World Cup. Two days later, Ireland defeated Scotland 27–3. On 24 September, Samoa played their first match against Russia in Kumagaya, and Samoa went on to win 34–9. Four days later, hosts Japan defeated Ireland 19–12, scoring four out of six penalties. While it was an upset win for Japan, World Rugby later admitted three of the four offside penalties were incorrectly awarded to Japan. Kenki Fukuoka scored a try in the 58th minute to give Japan a two-point lead after Ireland's Garry Ringrose and Rob Kearney had scored the opening two tries. Yu Tamura's conversion and fourth successful penalty kick sealed the result for Japan. Scotland recorded their first victory of the World Cup with a 34–0 whitewash victory over Samoa in muggy conditions in Kobe, with Samoan captain Jack Lam stating that the rugby ball was "a bar of soap."

Three days later, Kobe Misaki Stadium held another match in Pool A – this time it was Ireland, who whitewashed their opponents (Russia) in a 35–0 victory with five different players getting tries for the Irish. The Irish though, did not have everything go right with Jordi Murphy being subbed off in the 27th minute due to a possible rib injury, which added to the Irish back row pain after losing Jack Conan earlier in the tournament. Japan recorded their third victory over Samoa in Toyota with a 85th minute try from Kotaro Matsushima sealing the Japanese a 38–19 bonus point victory. Russia in the final match of the tournament was hammered by Scotland 61–0 with George Horne scoring a hat-trick as the Scots became the first team in World Cup history to not concede a point from two consecutive World Cup matches. A red card to Bundee Aki in the 29th minute forced Ireland to go down to 14 men but that was the only blemish with Ireland winning 47–5 over Samoa in Fukuoka. Johnny Sexton scoring two tries for the Irish. The typhoon saw the Japan–Scotland match under threat with the Scottish Rugby Union demanding legal action if it was cancelled. But after an inspection deemed the match to go ahead, Japan held their nerve against a fast-finishing Scotland to take home a 28–21 victory with Kenki Fukuoka scoring two tries. The win saw Japan become the first Tier 2 team to qualify since 2007, as they topped the group while Ireland finished in second place.

20 September 2019	Japan	30–10	Russia	Tokyo Stadium, Chōfu
22 September 2019	Ireland	27–3	Scotland	International Stadium Yokohama, Yokohama
24 September 2019	Russia	9–34	Samoa	Kumagaya Rugby Stadium, Kumagaya
28 September 2019	Japan	19–12	Ireland	Shizuoka Stadium Ecopa, Fukuroi
30 September 2019	Scotland	34–0	Samoa	Kobe Misaki Stadium, Kobe
3 October 2019	Ireland	35–0	Russia	Kobe Misaki Stadium, Kobe
5 October 2019	Japan	38–19	Samoa	City of Toyota Stadium, Toyota
9 October 2019	Scotland	61–0	Russia	Shizuoka Stadium Ecopa, Fukuroi
12 October 2019	Ireland	47–5	Samoa	Fukuoka Hakatanomori Stadium, Fukuoka
13 October 2019	Japan	28–21	Scotland	International Stadium Yokohama, Yokohama

=== Pool B ===
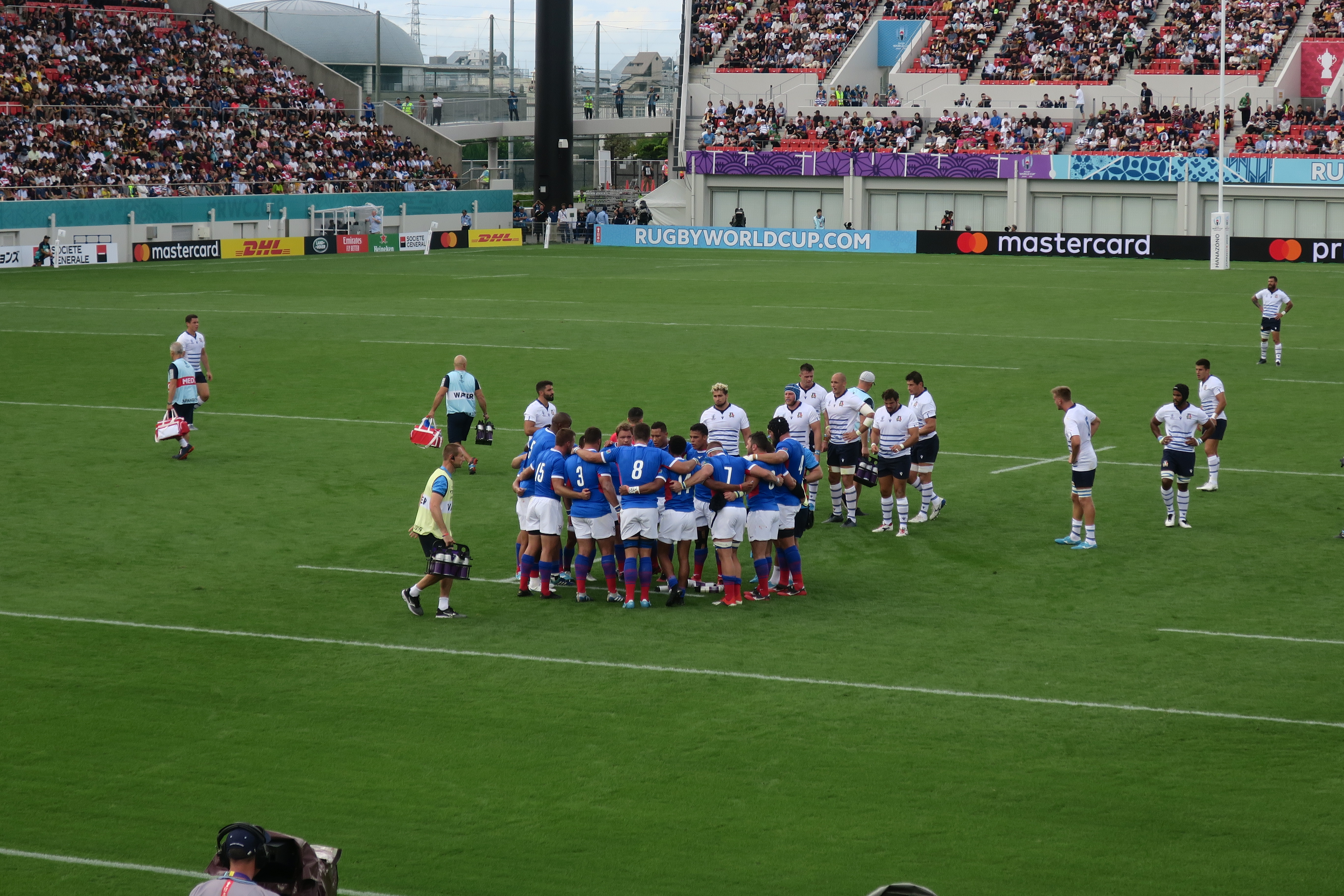
Italy taking on Namibia at Hanazono Rugby Stadium, Higashiōsaka.

Pos	Team	Pld	W	D	L	PF	PA	PD	T	B	Pts
1	New Zealand	4	3	1	0	157	22	+135	22	2	16
2	South Africa	4	3	0	1	185	36	+149	27	3	15
3	Italy	4	2	1	1	98	78	+20	14	2	12
4	Namibia	4	0	1	3	34	175	−141	3	0	2
5	Canada	4	0	1	3	14	177	−163	2	0	2

Pool B started with New Zealand beating South Africa 23–13. New Zealand opened their scoring with two tries in four minutes from George Bridge and Scott Barrett giving New Zealand a 17–3 lead at half-time. Pieter-Steph du Toit scored a converted try to bring the score back to 17–10 but two penalties from Richie Mo'unga and Beauden Barrett sealed the result. In Higashiōsaka, Italy conceded an early try against Namibia before running away with a bonus-point victory by 25 points. Italy earned a second bonus-point victory in Fukuoka, scoring seven tries in a 48–7 demolition of Canada. Over in Toyota, South Africa defeated Namibia by 54 points, scoring nine tries while Namibia could manage only a Cliven Loubser penalty in the 23rd minute. New Zealand recorded their second victory of the World Cup with a 63–0 victory over Canada at Ōita Stadium. For New Zealand, Brad Weber scored his first two tries in international rugby with the Barrett brothers (Jordie Barrett, Beauden Barrett and Scott Barrett) each scoring a try as they became the first trio of brothers to start for New Zealand.

New Zealand continued their demolition of their opponents with a 62-point win over Namibia in Chōfu, with the floodgates opening in the second half after Namibia restricted the All Blacks to 24 points in the first half. Sevu Reece, Ben Smith and Anton Lienert-Brown scoring two tries in the match. Between the two New Zealand games, South Africa romped over Italy with Cheslin Kolbe scoring two tries as the South Africans won 49–3 in Fukuroi. This was followed by a 66–7 victory over Canada with Cobus Reinach scoring the fastest hat-trick in World Cup history, with his three tries being scored in a space of 11 minutes. The final two matches of the group were not played as Typhoon Hagibis saw the cancellation of the New Zealand–Italy and Namibia–Canada matches. At the end of the pool stage, New Zealand finished on top of the table with South Africa finishing second.

21 September 2019	New Zealand	23–13	South Africa	International Stadium Yokohama, Yokohama
22 September 2019	Italy	47–22	Namibia	Hanazono Rugby Stadium, Higashiōsaka
26 September 2019	Italy	48–7	Canada	Fukuoka Hakatanomori Stadium, Fukuoka
28 September 2019	South Africa	57–3	Namibia	City of Toyota Stadium, Toyota
2 October 2019	New Zealand	63–0	Canada	Ōita Stadium, Ōita
4 October 2019	South Africa	49–3	Italy	Shizuoka Stadium Ecopa, Fukuroi
6 October 2019	New Zealand	71–9	Namibia	Tokyo Stadium, Chōfu
8 October 2019	South Africa	66–7	Canada	Kobe Misaki Stadium, Kobe
12 October 2019	New Zealand	0–0^{1}	Italy	City of Toyota Stadium, Toyota
13 October 2019	Namibia	0–0^{2}	Canada	Kamaishi Recovery Memorial Stadium, Kamaishi

=== Pool C ===
Pos	Team	Pld	W	D	L	PF	PA	PD	T	B	Pts
1	England	4	3	1	0	119	20	+99	17	3	17
2	France	4	3	1	0	79	51	+28	9	1	15
3	Argentina	4	2	0	2	106	91	+15	14	3	11
4	Tonga	4	1	0	3	67	105	−38	9	2	6
5	United States	4	0	0	4	52	156	−104	7	0	0

Pool C's opening match saw Argentina come back from a 17-point half-time deficit against France at Tokyo Stadium, only for France's Camille Lopez to score a game-winning drop goal in the 70th minute to win 23–21. In Sapporo, two tries from Manu Tuilagi helped England to a bonus-point victory over Tonga. England followed that up with a 38-point victory over the United States, with Joe Cokanasiga scoring two tries in the victory; however, the match was soured by the first red card of the tournament, shown to the United States' John Quill for a shoulder charge to the head of England's Owen Farrell. Argentina bounced back from their defeat by France with a 28–12 victory over Tonga in Higashiōsaka; all of Argentina's scoring happened in the first 28 minutes, including a hat-trick from Julián Montoya as they raced to a 28-point lead before Tonga brought the margin back to 16 with two tries of their own. After Typhoon Mitag almost cancelled the match, the French were inconsistent with errors keeping the United States in the match before three late tries in the second half secured a 33–9 win in Fukuoka.

In Chōfu, England qualified for the quarter-finals with a 39–10 victory over Argentina with Argentine player Tomás Lavanini being shown a red card, which forced Argentina down to 14 men as he was forced off due to a high tackle on Owen Farrell's head. France later joined them in qualifying for the knockout stage with a two-point victory over Tonga at Kumamoto Stadium. After conceding the first 17 points of the match, Tonga came back into the match with tries from Sonatane Takulua and Mali Hingano to close the gap to only three points before Romain Ntamack gave the cushion that France needed with two penalties in eight minutes giving France the victory. Argentina became the first team to finish their matches of the 2019 World Cup, with a 47–17 victory over the United States in Kumagaya. Joaquín Tuculet and Juan Cruz Mallia each scored two tries in the meeting, their first since 2003. After the England–France game was cancelled due to Typhoon Hagibis, Tonga ended their World Cup campaign with a 31–19 victory over the United States. This was due to the Tongan's using their opportunities with them converting into tries and despite the United States being within striking range with three minutes to go, Telusa Veainu converted the match-winning try and a bonus-point victory for Tonga. At the end of the pool stage, it was England winning the group with France finishing in second place.

21 September 2019	France	23–21	Argentina	Tokyo Stadium, Chōfu
22 September 2019	England	35–3	Tonga	Sapporo Dome, Sapporo
26 September 2019	England	45–7	United States	Kobe Misaki Stadium, Kobe
28 September 2019	Argentina	28–12	Tonga	Hanazono Rugby Stadium, Higashiōsaka
2 October 2019	France	33–9	United States	Fukuoka Hakatanomori Stadium, Fukuoka
5 October 2019	England	39–10	Argentina	Tokyo Stadium, Chōfu
6 October 2019	France	23–21	Tonga	Kumamoto Stadium, Kumamoto
9 October 2019	Argentina	47–17	United States	Kumagaya Rugby Stadium, Kumagaya
12 October 2019	England	0–0^{1}	France	International Stadium Yokohama, Yokohama
13 October 2019	United States	19–31	Tonga	Hanazono Rugby Stadium, Higashiōsaka

=== Pool D ===
Pos	Team	Pld	W	D	L	PF	PA	PD	T	B	Pts
1	Wales	4	4	0	0	136	69	+67	17	3	19
2	Australia	4	3	0	1	136	68	+68	20	4	16
3	Fiji	4	1	0	3	110	108	+2	17	3	7
4	Georgia	4	1	0	3	65	122	−57	9	1	5
5	Uruguay	4	1	0	3	60	140	−80	6	0	4

Pool D opened with Australia beating Fiji by 18 points in Sapporo after Fiji led by two points at half-time. Australia scored four tries in the second half for the bonus point. Wales beat Georgia 43–14 at City of Toyota Stadium, after leading 29–0 at half-time and 22–0 after three tries in the first 19 minutes. In Kamaishi, Fiji scored the opening try against Uruguay. Two mistakes within eight minutes gave Teros the lead before a try from Juan Manuel Cat enhanced it to 12 points at half-time. Three Fijian tries in the second half were to no avail as two penalty goals from Felipe Berchesi gave Uruguay their first win in a World Cup since 2003. In Kumagaya on 29 September, Georgia recorded a 33–7 win over Uruguay. Dominant work by their forwards in the second half laid the foundation for the bonus-point victory. Over in Chōfu, Dan Biggar scored the fastest drop goal in World Cup history as Wales led 23–8 at the half. Two second-half tries from Australia brought the scores to within a point but the Welsh held out for a 29–25 win.

A second half performance from Fiji at a wet Hanazono Rugby Stadium saw the Fijians record their first win of their 2019 World Cup campaign as they won 45–10 over Georgia. This was partly due to Semi Radradra scoring two tries while also aiding in setting up three more tries as Fiji scored seven tries to one in the bonus-point victory. Another slow start for the Australians in their game with Uruguay did not stop them from recording a win over the South Americans, with Tevita Kuridrani and Dane Haylett-Petty each getting two tries in the 35-point victory at Ōita Stadium. Four days later at the same stadium, Fiji got off to a 10–0 lead with the tries coming from Josua Tuisova and Kini Murimurivalu within eight minutes. Fiji held their lead until the 31st minute when Josh Adams scored his second try of three for the match. Wales increased their lead from there to win 29–17, qualifying for the quarter-finals with Australia. The penultimate match of Pool D saw Australia outlast a tough Georgia in difficult conditions in Fukuroi, as they won 27–8. Wales finished undefeated with a 35–13 win over Uruguay at Kumamoto Stadium to record a bonus-point victory and set up a quarter-final with France while Australia came in second.

21 September 2019	Australia	39–21	Fiji	Sapporo Dome, Sapporo
23 September 2019	Wales	43–14	Georgia	City of Toyota Stadium, Toyota
25 September 2019	Fiji	27–30	Uruguay	Kamaishi Recovery Memorial Stadium, Kamaishi
29 September 2019	Georgia	33–7	Uruguay	Kumagaya Rugby Stadium, Kumagaya
29 September 2019	Australia	25–29	Wales	Tokyo Stadium, Chōfu
3 October 2019	Georgia	10–45	Fiji	Hanazono Rugby Stadium, Higashiōsaka
5 October 2019	Australia	45–10	Uruguay	Ōita Stadium, Ōita
9 October 2019	Wales	29–17	Fiji	Ōita Stadium, Ōita
11 October 2019	Australia	27–8	Georgia	Shizuoka Stadium Ecopa, Fukuroi
13 October 2019	Wales	35–13	Uruguay	Kumamoto Stadium, Kumamoto

== Knockout stage ==
The knockout stage of the Rugby World Cup consisted of three single-elimination rounds leading to a final and a third-place playoff. Following a tie in regulation time, two 10-minute periods of extra time would be used to determine a winner. If the scores are tied at the end of extra time, an additional 10-minute "sudden death" period is played, with the first team to score any points being declared the winner. If the score remains tied at the end of extra time, a kicking competition would ensue.

Quarter-finals
19 October – Ōita
England	40
Australia	16
19 October – Chōfu
New Zealand	46
Ireland	14
20 October – Ōita
Wales	20
France	19
20 October – Chōfu
Japan	3
South Africa	26

Semi-finals
26 October – Yokohama
England	19
New Zealand	7
27 October – Yokohama
Wales	16
South Africa	19

Final
2 November – Yokohama
England	12
South Africa	32
Third place
1 November – Chōfu
New Zealand	40
Wales	17

=== Quarter-finals ===
The first two quarter-finals were played on Saturday. The first quarter-final saw England defeat Australia 40–16 at Ōita Stadium. Two tries from Jonny May, plus the 18 turnovers that the Australians conceded and led to two more being scored by England, sealed the result that prompted Michael Cheika to resign as Australian coach. The following match saw New Zealand book their spot in the semi-finals, with the All Blacks cruising to a 46–14 win over Ireland at Tokyo Stadium. Aaron Smith scored two of the All Blacks' seven tries, with the Irish only getting on the board in the 69th minute from a Robbie Henshaw converted try. A penalty try was then added seven minutes later.

The other two quarter-finals were played the following day. In the opening match, France got off to an early 12–0 lead with Sébastien Vahaamahina and Charles Ollivon both scoring tries in the first eight minutes. Aaron Wainwright opened the Welsh account with a try in the 12th minute before Virimi Vakatawa scored the French's third, giving them a 19–10 lead at the break. Nine minutes into the second half, France went down to 14 men with Sébastien Vahaamahina being red-carded for an elbow to Aaron Wainwright as Wales went on to win the match 20–19 with a 74th minute try to Ross Moriarty. In the last quarter-final match, it was South Africa who claimed a 26–3 win over Japan with Makazole Mapimpi scoring two tries in the victory.

19 October 2019
16:15 JST (UTC+09)

England	40–16	Australia
Try: May (2) 18' c, 21' c Sinckler 46' c Watson 76' c Con: Farrell (4/4) 19', 23', 47', 77'; Pen: Farrell (4/4) 30', 51', 66', 73'	Report	Try: Koroibete 43' c Con: Lealiifano (1/1) 44'; Pen: Lealiifano (3/3) 12', 26', 41'

Ōita Stadium, Ōita
Attendance: 36,954
Referee: Jérôme Garcès (France)

19 October 2019
19:15 JST (UTC+09)

New Zealand	46–14	Ireland
Try: A. Smith (2) 14' c, 20' c B. Barrett 32' m Taylor 48' c Todd 61' m Bridge 73' c J. Barrett 79' m Con: Mo'unga (4/7) 15', 22', 49' 74'; Pen: Mo'unga (1/1) 6'	Report	Try: Henshaw 69' c Penalty try 76'; Con: Carbery (1/1) 69'

Tokyo Stadium, Chōfu
Attendance: 46,686
Referee: Nigel Owens (Wales)

20 October 2019
16:15 JST (UTC+09)

Wales	20–19	France
Try: Wainwright 12' c Moriarty 74' c Con: Biggar (2/2) 13', 75'; Pen: Biggar (2/2) 20', 54'	Report	Try: Vahaamahina 5' m Ollivon 8' c Vakatawa 31' c Con: Ntamack (2/3) 9', 32'

Ōita Stadium, Ōita
Attendance: 34,426
Referee: Jaco Peyper (South Africa)

20 October 2019
19:15 JST (UTC+09)

Japan	3–26	South Africa
Pen: Tamura (1/1) 20'	Report	Try: Mapimpi (2) 4' m, 70' m de Klerk 66' c Con: Pollard (1/3) 66'; Pen: Pollard (3/4) 44', 49', 64'

Tokyo Stadium, Chōfu
Attendance: 48,831
Referee: Wayne Barnes (England)

=== Semi-finals ===
In the first semi-final, England took on New Zealand in front of 68,843 spectators in Yokohama. In response to New Zealand's haka, England's players stood in a V-shape formation, for which they were later fined having crossed the halfway line. England scored the opening points of the game in the second minute with a try from Manu Tuilagi, converted by Owen Farrell. After two penalties on either side of the half, the All Blacks responded in the 57th minute to close the gap to six points with a converted try from Ardie Savea, but two later penalties in the 63rd and the 69th confirmed England's spot in the final.

The second semi-final was also played in Yokohama, as the 67,750 spectators in attendance saw South Africa take on Wales for a spot against England in the final. South Africa took a 9–6 lead into half-time, but Biggar levelled the scores with a penalty kick six minutes into the second half. Damian de Allende then scored the first try of the match in the 57th minute, fending off two Welsh tacklers to score from 20 metres out. Wales again equalised thanks to Josh Adams scoring down the short side from an attacking scrum on the South African five-metre line; however, they were penalised for collapsing a maul with five minutes left in the game, allowing Pollard to kick the winning points and book South Africa a spot in the final.

26 October 2019
17:00 JST (UTC+09)

England	19–7	New Zealand
Try: Tuilagi 2' c Con: Farrell (1/1) 3'; Pen: Ford (4/5) 40', 50', 63', 69'	Report	Try: Savea 57' c Con: Mo'unga (1/1) 58'

International Stadium Yokohama, Yokohama
Attendance: 68,843
Referee: Nigel Owens (Wales)

27 October 2019
18:00 JST (UTC+09)

Wales	16–19	South Africa
Try: Adams 65' c Con: Halfpenny (1/1) 66'; Pen: Biggar (3/3) 18', 39', 46'	Report	Try: de Allende 57' c Con: Pollard (1/1) 58'; Pen: Pollard (4/4) 15', 20', 35', 76'

International Stadium Yokohama, Yokohama
Attendance: 67,750
Referee: Jérôme Garcès (France)

=== Bronze final ===
The bronze medal was won by New Zealand in a convincing win over Wales.

1 November 2019
18:00 JST (UTC+09)

New Zealand	40–17	Wales
Try: Moody 5' c B. Barrett 13' c B. Smith (2) 33' c, 40+1' c Crotty 42' c Mo'unga 76' m Con: Mo'unga (5/6) 7', 14', 34', 40+2', 44'	Report	Try: Amos 19' c Adams 59' c Con: Patchell (1/1) 21'; Biggar (1/1) 61'; Pen: Patchell (1/1) 27'

Tokyo Stadium, Chōfu
Attendance: 48,842
Referee: Wayne Barnes (England)

=== Final ===
England started as favourites for the final, but they had an unfortunate start to the game as Kyle Sinckler was substituted in the third minute after colliding with Maro Itoje, leaving England with only one tighthead prop. South Africa tight forwards Bongi Mbonambi and Lood de Jager left the field through injuries in the 21st minute. During the first half the only points scored were from penalties, with South Africa leading 12–6 at half time after several handling errors by England. England came close to scoring a try, but did not manage to score after 26 phases.

Two more successful penalties on either side made the score 18–12 at the beginning of the second half. Makazole Mapimpi scored the first try in the 66th minute, making South Africa's lead 25–12 after the conversion while becoming the first Springbok to score a try in a World Cup final. Cheslin Kolbe followed up with another try eight minutes later, making the final score 32–12.

2 November 2019
18:00 JST (UTC+09)

England	12–32	South Africa
Pen: Farrell (4/5) 23', 35', 52', 60'	Report	Try: Mapimpi 66' c Kolbe 74' c Con: Pollard (2/2) 67', 75'; Pen: Pollard (6/8) 10', 26', 39', 43', 46', 58'

International Stadium Yokohama, Yokohama
Attendance: 70,103
Referee: Jérôme Garcès (France)

== Statistics ==
=== Most tries ===
7 tries

- (Wales) Josh Adams

6 tries

- (South Africa) Makazole Mapimpi

5 tries

- (Japan) Kotaro Matsushima

4 tries

- (Argentina) Julián Montoya
- (Japan) Kenki Fukuoka
- (New Zealand) Ben Smith

=== Most points ===
Top 10 point scorers
Player	Team	Total	Details			
Player	Team	Total	Tries	Conversions	Penalties	Drop goals
Handré Pollard	South Africa	69	0	9	16	1
Owen Farrell	England	58	0	11	12	0
Richie Mo'unga	New Zealand	54	1	20	3	0
Yu Tamura	Japan	51	0	9	11	0
Dan Biggar	Wales	41	0	10	6	1
Josh Adams	Wales	35	7	0	0	0
George Ford	England	32	2	5	4	0
Jordie Barrett	New Zealand	31	3	8	0	0
Makazole Mapimpi	South Africa	30	6	0	0	0
Felipe Berchesi	Uruguay	30	0	6	6	0

== Typhoon Hagibis and match cancellations ==
On 10 October, World Rugby and the Japan Rugby 2019 Organising Committee announced that, due to the predicted weather caused by Typhoon Hagibis, the Pool B meeting between New Zealand and Italy and the Pool C meeting between England and France had been cancelled. The decisions had been made on safety grounds with considerations on the expected impact the typhoon would have on Tokyo, including likely public transport shutdown or disruption. This was the first ever occasion any Rugby World Cup match had been cancelled. Decision on cancellation of pool games scheduled for 13 October was made on the day of the game, including the match between Japan and Scotland.

On the evening of 12 October Japan Standard Time (JST), World Rugby and the Japan 2019 Organising Committee released a statement that they had advised Namibia and Canada of the possibility of their game being cancelled, with the typhoon predicted to impact Kamaishi. On 13 October, World Rugby and the Japan 2019 Organising Committee announced the cancellation of the Namibia–Canada game in Kamaishi. The decision was made following a level 5 evacuation order in the city on the day of the match following the typhoon. Canada's national team stayed in Kamaishi to help out local residents with their cleanup efforts. The Namibia national team interacted with fans in the campsite Miyako City.

Shortly after the announcement of the cancellation of the Namibia–Canada game, it was confirmed that the matches between Wales and Uruguay and the United States and Tonga would go ahead as scheduled. By noon on 12 October, it was confirmed that the match between Japan and Scotland was unaffected by the typhoon and would take place as scheduled, in front of spectators who had previously feared that they might have missed out with the game played behind closed doors.

In line with tournament rules, the canceled pool matches were declared as drawn, the points being shared two each with no score registered. With these cancellations, France were unable to compete for the top pool position (held by England at the time), with a victory to secure that place. For Italy, however, the cancellation effectively eliminated them from the tournament; a victory against defending champions New Zealand could have seen them qualify for the knock-out stage, dependent on the margin of the win. This also had implications on whether South Africa finished top of their pool or as runners-up, having already confirmed their progression to the quarter-finals.

== Broadcasting ==
For the first time, the domestic rights holder did not serve as the host broadcaster of the tournament. Instead, International Games Broadcast Services (IGBS), a joint venture between Host Broadcast Services (HBS) and IMG, handled production of the footage distributed to rights holders. IGBS used production resources from traditional rugby nations such as Australia, France, New Zealand, South Africa and the United Kingdom. Japanese broadcaster NHK covered selected games in 8K resolution, using a combination of nine 8K cameras and up-converted 4K resolution footage from IGBS. The International Broadcast Centre was located outside Ajinomoto Stadium.

World Rugby streamed the tournament on its website for unsold markets. Sport24 was the rights holder for in-flight/in-ship broadcast. In South Africa, pay television channel SuperSport had broadcasting rights. To enable the whole country to watch, the free-to-air South African Broadcasting Corporation (SABC) broadcast the final after they reached an agreement with MultiChoice.

Territory	Rights holder	Ref.
Albania	DigitAlb	
Argentina	TPA	
Australia	Fox Sports; Network Ten	
Belgium	Telenet	
Brazil	ESPN	
Canada	TSN	
Cyprus	CYTA	
Czech Republic	Pragosport	
Fiji	Fiji TV	
France	TF1 Group	
Georgia	GPB	
Germany	ProSiebenSat.1 Media	
Hong Kong	beIN Sports	
India	Sony Pictures Networks	
Ireland	Eir Sport; RTÉ	
Israel	Charlton	
Italy	RAI	
Japan	DAZN; J Sports; NHK; Nippon TV	
Kosovo	DigitAlb	
Latin America	ESPN	
Latvia	LTV7	
Malaysia	RTM	
MENA	beIN Sports	
Netherlands	Ziggo Sport	
New Zealand	Spark Sport; TVNZ	
Nordic	NENT	
Pacific Islands	Fiji TV	
Poland	Polsat	
Portugal	Sport TV	
Russia	Match TV	
Romania	TVR	
Slovakia	Pragosport	
Southeast Asia	beIN Sports	
Spain	Movistar+	
Sub-Saharan Africa	SuperSport	
Taiwan	ELTA	
United Kingdom	ITV; S4C	
United States	NBCUniversal	
Uruguay	Channel 10	

== Notes ==
^1 Typhoon Hagibis caused the matches New Zealand versus Italy and England versus France to be cancelled and recorded as 0–0 draws.

^2 Typhoon Hagibis and an associated evacuation order for Kamaishi caused the match between Namibia and Canada to be cancelled and recorded as a 0–0 draw.
