= James Faiva =

Tonga international rugby union player

- Full name: James Nunu Fainga'anuku Faiva
- Born: 13 June 1994 (age 32) Ōtāhuhu, Tonga
- Height: 1.85 m (6 ft 1 in)
- Weight: 89 kg (196 lb)

Rugby union career
- Position: Flyhalf
- Current team: Petrarca Padova
Amateur team(s)
Years	Team	Apps	(Points)
2015−2016	Skerries RFC		
2017	Penrith	12	(69)
2018	West Harbour	9	(44)
2019	Papa Toetoe Rugby Club		
Senior career
Years	Team	Apps	(Points)
2018−2019	CR El Salvador	13	(184)
2019−	Petrarca Padova	35	(92)
- Correct as of 22 September 2019
International career
Years	Team	Apps	(Points)
2016−2018	Tonga A	10	(52)
2019−present	Tonga	5	(2)
- Correct as of 22 September 2019

James Nunu Fainga'anuku Faiva (born 13 June 1994) is a Tongan rugby union player who generally plays as a fly half represents Tonga internationally and currently plays for Italian Top10 Petrarca Padova. He was included in the Tongan squad for the 2019 Rugby World Cup which is held in Japan for the first time and also marks his first World Cup appearance.

== Career ==
He made his international debut for Tonga against Samoa on 27 July 2019.
