= Zane Kapeli =

Tongan rugby union player

- Full name: Zane Rance Kapeli
- Born: 28 September 1992 (age 34) Auckland, New Zealand
- Height: 188 cm (6 ft 2 in)
- Weight: 103 kg (227 lb; 16 st 3 lb)
- School: Sacred Heart College

Rugby union career
- Position(s): Flanker, Number 8
- Current team: Bay of Plenty, Highlanders
Senior career
Years	Team	Apps	(Points)
2013–2015	Waikato	18	(5)
2018–	Bay of Plenty	6	(0)
2020	Highlanders	0	(0)
2021-	Chiefs	5	(0)
- Correct as of 31 May 2020
International career
Years	Team	Apps	(Points)
2018–	Tonga	10	(5)
- Correct as of 31 May 2020

Zane Rance Kapeli (born 28 September 1992) is a Tongan rugby union player who generally plays as a loose forward represents Tonga internationally and currently plays for club Bay of Plenty Steamers. He was included in the Tongan squad for the 2019 Rugby World Cup which is held in Japan for the first time and also marks his first World Cup appearance.

== Career ==
He made his international debut for Tonga against Georgia on 24 November 2018.
