= Tony Lamborn =

US international rugby union player (born 1991)

- Full name: Tony Andrew Lamborn
- Born: July 31, 1991 (age 35) Timaru, New Zealand
- Height: 6 ft 1 in (185 cm)
- Weight: 235 lb (107 kg; 16 st 11 lb)
- School: Ashburton College
- Notable relative: James King (cousin)

Rugby union career
- Position(s): Flanker, Number 8
- Current team: Southland, Blues
Senior career
Years	Team	Apps	(Points)
2012	North Otago	9	(15)
2013–2017	Hawke's Bay	46	(45)
2016	Hurricanes	4	(0)
2018	San Diego Legion	2	(0)
2018	Southland	9	(5)
2019	New Orleans Gold	1	(10)
2020–	Blues	9	(5)
2020–	Southland	10	(20)
- Correct as of 25 December 2020
International career
Years	Team	Apps	(Points)
2016–2019	United States	23	(40)
- Correct as of 8 September 2020

Tony Lamborn (born 31 July 1991) is a New Zealand-born American rugby union player who plays as a flanker. He currently plays his club rugby for Southland in the Mitre 10 Cup, and the Blues in the Super Rugby competition. He also played for the United States national rugby union team.

== Career ==
Lamborn was educated at Ashburton College. He left school at age 16 and travelled to Havelock North.

Lamborn played for Hawke's Bay U18 and U20 teams.

Lamborn debuted for the Magpies in 2013, however it was in 2015 when his performances really started to catch the eye. He was named as Hawke's Bay's 2015 MVP as they won the ITM Cup championship with a 26-25 loss over Tasman . Subsequently, he was named as a member of the Hurricanes wider training group ahead of the 2016 Super Rugby season.

== International ==
In May 2016, Lamborn was named to the United States national rugby union team for their June 2016 tests. He qualified to play for the Eagles due to his father and other relatives being American.

== Family ==
Lamborn is the cousin of James King, a former Blues and Melbourne Rebels Super Rugby player.
