= Latiume Fosita =

Tongan rugby union player (born 1992)

- Full name: Latiume Junior Fosita
- Born: 25 July 1992 (age 34) Felemea, Tonga
- Height: 1.84 m (6 ft 0 in)
- Weight: 102 kg (16 st 1 lb; 225 lb)
- School: Otahuhu College
- University: University of the Witwatersrand

Rugby union career
- Position(s): First five-eighth, Centre, Wing
- Current team: Counties Manukau/Selknam
Amateur team(s)
| Years | Team | Apps | (Points) |
| 2013 | Wits | 2 | (8) |
Senior career
| Years | Team | Apps | (Points) |
| 2015 | Doncaster Knights | 8 | (2) |
| 2020 | Selknam | 2 | (0) |
- Correct as of 11 November 2018
Provincial / State sides
| Years | Team | Apps | (Points) |
| 2013-14 | Northland | 11 | (5) |
| 2016-17 | Auckland | 13 | (5) |
| 2018- | Counties Manukau | 8 | (31) |
International career
| Years | Team | Apps | (Points) |
| 2012- | Tonga u20s | 3 | (0) |
| 2013- | Tonga | 29 | (38) |
- Correct as of 25 September 2019

Latiume Junior Fosita (born 25 July 1992) is a Tonga rugby union player who currently plays as a utility back for Auckland in the Mitre 10 Cup and the Tonga national rugby union team.

== Career ==
Fosita started his career with a surprise move from Auckland to South Africa where he turned out for Wits University in the 2013 Varsity Cup tournament. However, the move west didn't work out as planned and he played only 2 games before heading back to New Zealand. He linked up with Northland ahead of the 2013 ITM Cup, the move had teething problems for both parties as the Taniwha endured a disappointing campaign and Fosita only made 1 appearance. 2014 was more fruitful with Fosita making 10 appearances and Northland showing a much improved performance.

== International career ==
Fosita made his international debut for Tonga on 9 November 2013 in a match against Romania in Bucharest and has since established himself as a regular member of the side.

While he was initially not selected for the 2019 Rugby World Cup squad, he was selected as a replacement for Kurt Morath.
