= Sébastien Vahaamahina =

France international rugby union player (born 1991)

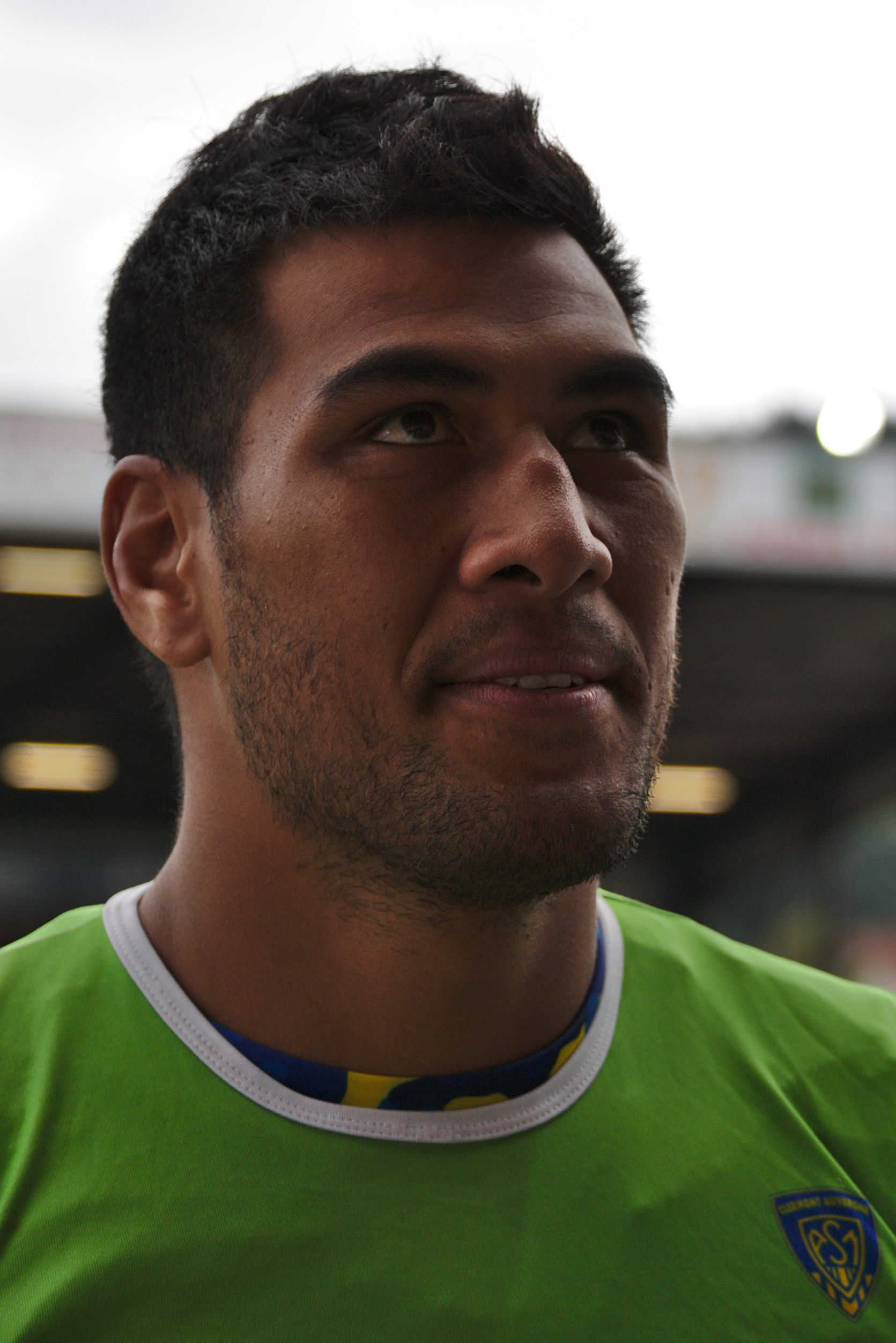
- Born: Sébastien Vahaamahina; 21 October 1991 (age 35) Nouméa, New Caledonia
- Height: 2.02 m (6 ft 7 1/2 in)
- Weight: 126 kg (19 st 12 lb; 278 lb)

Rugby union career
- Position: Lock
Senior career
Years	Team	Apps	(Points)
2010–2011	Brive	1	(0)
2011–2014	Perpignan	49	(20)
2014–2023	Clermont	171	(45)
International career
Years	Team	Apps	(Points)
2012–2019	France	46	(5)

Sébastien Vahaamahina (born 21 October 1991) is a former French rugby union player of Wallisian origin from the French-administered South Pacific overseas collectivity of New Caledonia.

Vahaamahina's position is Lock and played most of his career for Clermont Auvergne in the Top 14. He began his career in New Caledonia and after moving to France, played with Brive before moving to Perpignan from 2011 to 2014. He was called up for France for the 2012 autumn internationals.

Born to parents from the Wallis and Futuna Polynesian community in Noumea, Vahaamahina began his rugby career in New Caledonia, in the South Pacific before moving to mainland France.

== International career ==
Vahaamahina represented France in the 2019 Rugby World Cup and scored his first try in the quarter-final against Wales, but was sent off after elbowing Welsh player Aaron Wainwright in the head. Wales went on to win the match by a scoreline of 20-19. The day after the match he announced he would retire from international rugby.

=== International tries ===
International tries
No.	Date	Venue	Opponent	Score	Result	Competition
1	20 October 2019	Ōita Stadium, Ōita, Japan	Wales	5–0	19–20	2019 Rugby World Cup
