= Mali Hingano =

Tongan rugby union player

Malietoa Hingano
- Full name: Malietoa Seuli Hingano
- Born: 27 January 1992 (age 34) Manly, New South Wales
- Height: 1.84 m (6 ft 0 in)
- Weight: 94 kg (207 lb)
- School: St Augustine’s College, Sydney

Rugby union career
- Position: Centre
- Current team: Aviron Bayonnais
Senior career
Years	Team	Apps	(Points)
2012-14	Manly Marlins	23	((30))
2014	Sydney Rays	5	((5))
2014-16	La Rochelle	31	((30))
2016-18	Honda Heat	10	((10))
2017-18	Clermont Auvergne	2	((5))
2018-19	Stade Français Paris	4	((0))
2019-	Bayonne	23	((5))
- Correct as of 22 September 2019
International career
Years	Team	Apps	(Points)
2019–present	Tonga	11	(25)
- Correct as of 22 September 2019

Malietoa Seuli Hingano also known as Malietoa Hingano (born 27 January 1992) is an Australian born Tongan rugby union player who generally plays as a centre represents Tonga internationally and currently plays for French club Aviron Bayonnais. He was included in the Tongan squad for the 2019 Rugby World Cup which was held in Japan for the first time and also marks his first World Cup appearance.

== Career ==
He made his international debut for Tonga against Samoa on 27 July 2019.
