= Sonatane Takulua =

Tonga international rugby union player

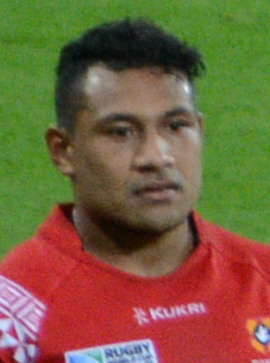
- Born: 11 January 1991 (age 35) Lapaha, Tonga
- Height: 1.76 m (5 ft 9 in)
- Weight: 96 kg (212 lb; 15 st 2 lb)
- School: Dargaville High School

Rugby union career
- Position: Scrum-half
- Current team: Mont-de-Marsan
Senior career
Years	Team	Apps	(Points)
2012–2014	Northland	26	(30)
2015–2020	Newcastle Falcons	102	(260)
2020–2021	Toulon	23	(51)
2022–2024	Agen	42	(40)
2025–	Carcassonne	4	(0)
- Correct as of 28 August 2023
International career
Years	Team	Apps	(Points)
2014–	Tonga	58	(278)
- Correct as of 12 July 2025
National sevens team
Years	Team		Comps
2013	Tonga		1
- Correct as of 12 July 2025

Sonatane Takulua (born 11 January 1991) is a Tongan professional rugby union player who plays as a scrum-half for Pro D2 club Mont-de-Marsan and captains the Tonga national team.

== Early life ==
Takalua was born in Lapaha, Tonga and moved to New Zealand with his family when he was 11.

== Club career ==
In 2012, Takulua was signed by Northland after a year on a development contract.

In 2014, he was signed by the Blues on a development contract. Although he was named in the matchday squad in two consecutive matches, he failed to make an appearance in the matches against the Hurricanes and the Brumbies.

On 26 February 2015. Takulua left Northland to sign for English side Newcastle Falcons in the Premiership Rugby with immediate effect. His impressive performances led him to sign a four-year contract extension to stay with the club until 2022.

On 24 February 2020, Takulua was granted his early release from Newcastle to sign for French giants Toulon in the Top 14 competition with immediate effect.
