= 2027 Men's Rugby World Cup – Regional play-off and Final Qualification Tournament =

Qualification tournament for the 2027 Men's Rugby World Cup

The 2027 Men's Rugby World Cup – Regional play-off and Final Qualification Tournament, which doubled as the Final Qualification Tournament for World Rugby Nations Championship's second division, were the final two stages of the qualifying process for the 2027 Men's Rugby World Cup.

The play-offs began with two cross-regional play-off matches and concluded with the Final Qualification Tournament which was held at The Sevens Stadium in Dubai from 8 to 18 November 2025.

== Format ==
=== Asia / Africa play-off ===
The first play-off was an Asia / Africa play-off one-off match between Asia 2 and Africa 2, which saw the winner earning a spot in the Final Qualification Tournament.

=== Pacific / Sudamérica qualifying play-off ===
The other cross-regional play-off was a two-leg play-off series between Sudamérica 2 and Pacific 4, where the winner qualified for the World Cup and World Rugby Nations Championship's second division as the Sudamérica / Pacific play-off winner. The runner-up advanced to the Final Qualification Tournament as the final team in the FQT as the Sudamérica / Pacific play-off loser.

=== Final Qualification Tournament ===
The Final Qualification Tournament was a round-robin tournament hosted at a neutral venue in Dubai, where the winner qualified for the World Cup.

The four participating teams were made up of two spots directly from regional qualifications; the fifth place team from Europe (Europe 5) and the third placed team from South America (Sudamérica 3). The two remaining spots were made up via cross-regional play-offs; the winner of the Asia / Africa play-off and the loser of the Pacific / Sudamérica qualifying play-off.

== Teams ==
Six teams progressed to the regional play-off and Final Qualification Tournament stages for the final two non-regional seeds in the World Cup.

(World rankings are as per date progressing to the play-off phase.)

Nation	Rank	Progression date	Qualifying status
Regional Qualification play-offs
Asia / Africa play-off
Namibia (Africa 2)	27	19 July 2025	Advanced to FQT on 26 July 2025
United Arab Emirates (Asia 2)	40	5 July 2025	Eliminated by Namibia on 26 July 2025
Pacific / Sudamérica qualifying play-off
Chile (Sudamérica 2)	20	6 September 2025	Qualified on 27 September 2025 as Pacific/Sudamérica qualifying play-off winner
Samoa (Pacific 4)	15	14 September 2025	Advanced to FQT on 27 September 2025
Final Qualification Tournament
Belgium (Europe 5)	26	15 March 2025	Eliminated by Samoa on 18 November 2025
Namibia (Asia / Africa play-off winner)	27	26 July 2025	Eliminated by Samoa on 13 November 2025
Brazil (Sudamérica 3) (Note: Paraguay defeated Brazil in the playoffs, but later withdrew after fielding an ineligible player.)	32	18 October 2025	Eliminated by Belgium on 13 November 2025
Samoa (Pacific / Sudamérica play-off loser)	16	27 September 2025	Qualified on 18 November 2025 as Final Qualification Tournament winner

== Asia/Africa play-off ==
The Asia / Africa play-off was played in Kampala, Uganda, which had also hosted the final stage of the African qualification process.

The match took place a week after the final of the 2025 Rugby Africa Cup and three weeks after the final match in the 2025 Asia Rugby Championship.

Namibia won the play-off match and progressed the to the Final Qualification Tournament, whilst the United Arab Emirates were eliminated.

26 July 2025
15:00 EAT (UTC+3)

United Arab Emirates	29–86	Namibia
Try: Ratuvecanua (2) 3' c, 57' c Stapley 22' c Johnson 27' m Con: Johnson (3/4) 4', 23', 58'; Pen: Johnson (1/1) 9'	Report	Try: Meyer 5' m Hardwick (2) 11' c, 25' c van Jaarsveld (2) 16' m, 20' m Kurz 32' c Mukwilongo (2) 42' c, 62' c van der Merwe 45' c Ludick 53' c Combrinck (2) 71' c, 80' c Katjijeko 75' m Con: van den Berg (9/13) 12', 26', 33', 43', 46', 54', 63', 72', 80+1'; Pen: van den Berg (1/1) 40'

Mandela National Stadium, Kampala, Uganda
Referee: Morné Ferreira (South Africa)

Team details

FB	15	Aaron Dubois		(substituted off) 44'
RW	14	Niko Volavola			(substituted off) 68'	(substituted off) 78'
OC	13	Sakiusa Naisau
IC	12	Jack Stapley
LW	11	Mohammad Ali Bandari		(substituted off) 44'	(substituted on) 68'
FH	10	Max Johnson
SH	9	Andrew Semple (c)
N8	8	Emosi Ratuvecanua
OF	7	Bradley Janes
BF	6	Ethan Matthews
RL	5	Esekaia Dranibota		(substituted off) 38'
LL	4	Marcus Guerin		(substituted off) 69'
TP	3	Riaan Barnard		(substituted off) 69'
HK	2	Moeneeb Galant
LP	1	Pieter Killian		(substituted off) 38'		(substituted on) 78'
Replacements:
PR	16	Epeli Davetawalu	(yellow card) 70'	(substituted on) 38'
HK	17	Lukas Waddington		(substituted on) 69'
PR	19	Micahel Sejean
FL	30	Matt Mills	(yellow card) 40'	(substituted on) 38'
WG	21	Tobias Oakeley		(substituted on) 69'
SH	23	Sam Bullock		(substituted on) 44'
WG	33	Liam Caldwell		(substituted on) 44'
Coach:
(South Africa) Jacques Benade

FB	15	Cliven Loubser		(substituted off) 40'
RW	14	Danie van der Merwe
OC	13	Alcino Izaacs
IC	12	Danco Burger
LW	11	Jurgen Meyer		(substituted off) 58'
FH	10	André van den Berg
SH	9	AJ Kearns	(yellow card) 57'
N8	8	Richard Hardwick		(substituted off) 40'	(substituted on) 63'
OF	7	Max Katjijeko
BF	6	Prince ǃGaoseb (c)			(substituted off) 63'
RL	5	Tiaan de Klerk		(substituted off) 55'
LL	4	Oliver Kurz		(substituted off) 40'
TP	3	Jason Benade		(substituted off) 46'
HK	2	Torsten van Jaarsveld		(substituted off) 46'
LP	1	Otja Auala		(substituted off) 55'
Replacements:
HK	16	Armand Combrinck		(substituted on) 46'
PR	17	Haitembu Shikufa		(substituted on) 55'
PR	18	Sidney Halupé		(substituted on) 46'
LK	19	Adriaan Ludick		(substituted on) 40'
FL	20	Riaan Grove		(substituted on) 55'
SH	21	Aston Mukwilongo		(substituted on) 40'
WG	22	Quirione Majiedt		(substituted on) 58'
FL	23	Adriaan Booysen		(substituted on) 40'
Coach:
(Namibia) Jacques Burger

Assistant referees:
Aimee Barrett-Theron (South Africa)
Adam Leal (England)
Television match official:
Quinton Immelman (South Africa)

== Pacific/Sudamérica qualifying play-off ==
Team 1	Agg.	Team 2	1st leg	2nd leg
Samoa	44–63	Chile	32–32	12–31

=== Leg 1 ===
20 September 2025
13:35 MDT (UTC−6)

Samoa	32–32	Chile
Try: Steffany 19' m Ah Kiong 42' m Motuga 58' c Papali'i (2) 72' c, 80+3' m Con: Leali'ifano (2/5) 60', 73'; Pen: Leali'ifano (1/1) 13'	Report	Try: Eissmann 4' c M. Garafulic (2) 16' m, 48' c Pedrero 23' c Con: S. Videla (3/4) 5', 24', 49'; Pen: S. Videla (2/3) 9', 37'

America First Field, Salt Lake City, United States
Referee: Andrew Brace (Ireland)

Team details

FB	15	Lolagi Visinia
RW	14	Elisapeta Alofipo		(substituted off) 55'	(substituted on) 63'	(substituted off) 69'
OC	13	Melani Nanai
IC	12	Theodore Steffany
LW	11	Latrell Ah Kiong
FH	10	Christian Leali'ifano
SH	9	Connor Tupai		(substituted off) 54'	(substituted on) 71'
N8	8	Iakopo Mapu	(yellow card) 18'
OF	7	Alamanda Motuga
BF	6	Olajuwon Noa		(substituted off) 54'
RL	5	Michael Curry		(substituted off) 60'
LL	4	Ben Nee-Nee
TP	3	Michael Alaalatoa (c)		(substituted off) 63'
HK	2	Pita Anae Ah-Sue		(substituted off) 54'
LP	1	Aki Seiuli		(substituted off) 30'
Substitutions:
HK	16	Ray Niuia		(substituted on) 54'
PR	17	Jarred Adams		(substituted on) 30'
PR	18	Brad Amituanai		(substituted on) 63'
FL	19	Potu Leavasa Jr.		(substituted on) 60'
FL	20	Abraham Papali'i		(substituted on) 54'
SH	21	Joel Lam		(substituted on) 54'	(substituted off) 71'
CE	22	Henry Taefu
FB	23	Tomasi Alosio		(substituted on) 55'	(substituted off) 63'	(substituted on) 69'
Coach:
Tusi Pisi

FB	15	Cristóbal Game		(substituted off) 27'	(substituted on) 39'
RW	14	Nicolás Garafulic				(substituted off) 66'
OC	13	Matías Garafulic
IC	12	Santiago Videla
LW	11	Iñaki Ayarza
FH	10	Juan Cruz Reyes		(substituted off) 59'
SH	9	Benjamín Videla	(yellow card) 42'	(substituted off) 59'
N8	8	Alfonso Escobar
OF	7	Clemente Saavedra (c)
BF	6	Raimundo Martínez		(substituted off) 71'	(substituted on) 79'
RL	5	Javier Eissmann
LL	4	Santiago Pedrero
TP	3	Iñaki Gurruchaga		(substituted off) 56'
HK	2	Diego Escobar		(substituted off) 68'
LP	1	Javier Carrasco		(substituted off) 65'	(substituted on) 76'
Substitutions:
HK	16	Augusto Böhme		(substituted on) 59'
PR	17	Norman Aguayo		(substituted on) 65'	(substituted off) 76'
PR	18	Matías Dittus		(substituted on) 56'
LK	19	Bruno Sáez		(substituted on) 71'	(substituted off) 79'
FL	20	Ernesto Tchimino		(substituted on) 68'
SH	21	Lucas Berti		(substituted on) 59'
CE	22	Nicolás Saab		(substituted on) 27'	(substituted off) 39'	(substituted on) 66'
FH	23	Tomás Salas
Coach:
(Uruguay) Pablo Lemoine

Assistant referees:
Luke Pearce (England)
Lex Weiner (United States)
Television match official:
Marius van der Westhuizen (South Africa)
Foul play review officer:
Mike Adamson (Scotland)

Notes:

- Theodore Steffany (Samoa) made his international debut.

=== Leg 2 ===
27 September 2025
16:30 CST (UTC-4)

Chile	31–12	Samoa
Try: B. Videla 24' c Ayarza 32' m Saab 77' c Con: S. Videla (2/3) 26', 80'; Pen: Ayarza (2/2) 6', 19'; S. Videla (2/2) 65', 69'	Report	Try: Nanai 36' c Mau'u 62'; Con: Talapusi (1/2) 37'

Estadio Sausalito, Viña del Mar
Attendance: 21,754
Referee: Luke Pearce (England)

Team details

FB	15	Iñaki Ayarza
RW	14	Matías Garafulic
OC	13	Domingo Saavedra	(substituted off) 55'
IC	12	Santiago Videla
LW	11	Nicolás Saab
FH	10	Rodrigo Fernández	(substituted off) 73'
SH	9	Benjamín Videla	(substituted off) 55'
N8	8	Alfonso Escobar
OF	7	Clemente Saavedra (c)
BF	6	Raimundo Martínez
RL	5	Javier Eissmann	(substituted off) 74'
LL	4	Santiago Pedrero	(substituted off) 77'
TP	3	Iñaki Gurruchaga	(substituted off) 53'
HK	2	Diego Escobar	(substituted off) 80'
LP	1	Javier Carrasco	(substituted off) 52'
Substitutions:
HK	16	Augusto Böhme	(substituted on) 80'
PR	17	Emilio Shea	(substituted on) 52'
PR	18	Matías Dittus	(substituted on) 53'
LK	19	Bruno Sáez	(substituted on) 74'
FL	20	Ernesto Tchimino	(substituted on) 77'
SH	21	Lucas Berti	(substituted on) 55'
FH	22	Juan Cruz Reyes	(substituted on) 73'
WG	23	Cristóbal Game	(substituted on) 55'
Coach:
(Uruguay) Pablo Lemoine

FB	15	Lolagi Visinia
RW	14	Tomasi Alosio
OC	13	Melani Nanai
IC	12	Theodore Steffany
LW	11	Latrell Ah Kiong	(substituted off) 33'
FH	10	Martini Talapusi	(substituted off) 67'
SH	9	Connor Tupai	(substituted off) 77'
N8	8	Abraham Papali'i
OF	7	Alamanda Motuga (cc)
BF	6	Olajuwon Noa	(substituted off) 56'
RL	5	Michael Curry	(substituted off) 55'
LL	4	Ben Nee-Nee (cc)
TP	3	Brad Amituanai	(substituted off) 33'	(substituted on) 40'	(substituted off) 67'
HK	2	Pita Anae Ah-Sue	(substituted off) 60'
LP	1	Jarred Adams	(substituted off) 72'
Substitutions:
HK	16	Ray Niuia	(substituted on) 60'
PR	17	Marco Fepulea'i	(substituted on) 72'
PR	18	Herman Huch	(substituted on) 33'	(substituted off) 40'	(substituted on) 67'
FL	19	Potu Leavasa Jr.	(substituted on) 55'
FL	20	Jonah Mau'u	(substituted on) 56'
SH	21	Rilloy Suesue	(substituted on) 77'
FH	22	Afa Moleli	(substituted on) 67'
FB	23	Elisapeta Alofipo	(substituted on) 33'
Coach:
Tusi Pisi

Assistant referees:
Damián Schneider (Argentina)
Tomás Bertazza (Argentina)
Television match official:
Marcelo Pilara (Argentina)

Notes:

- Emilio Shea (Chile), Marco Fepulea'i, Herman Huch and Rilloy Suesue (all Samoa) made their internationals debuts.
- This was Chile's first win over Samoa
- Chile move up to 17th on the World Rugby Rankings, their highest position, and qualified for the 2027 Men's Rugby World Cup, the first time they have appeared in back-to-back tournaments (after their debut in 2023).

== Final Qualification Tournament ==
Pos	Team	Pld	W	D	L	PF	PA	PD	TF	TA	TB	LB	Pts	Qualification
1	Samoa (16)	3	2	1	0	87	31	+56	12	4	2	0	12	Qualification to 2027 Men's Rugby World Cup
2	Belgium (22)	3	2	1	0	65	55	+10	8	6	1	0	11	
3	Namibia (27)	3	1	0	2	63	79	−16	9	11	1	1	6	
4	Brazil (32)	3	0	0	3	68	118	−50	9	17	1	1	2	

Updated to match(es) played on 18 November 2025. Source: World Rugby
Rules for classification:
Points are awarded to the teams as follows:1) 4 points for a win, 2 points for a draw, no points for a loss; 2) 1 bonus point for scoring 4 or more tries (TBP); 3) 1 bonus point for a loss by 7 points or under (LBP).

=== Fixtures ===
The fixtures for the 2027 Final Qualification Tournament were announced on 19 October 2025, in addition to the referee appointments.

Paraguay initially qualified for the FQT after defeating Brazil 70–43 on aggregate in the Sudamérica 3 play-off matches. However, after it was discovered that Paraguay had fielded an ineligible player during those matches, they withdrew and were replaced by Brazil.

==== Round 1 ====
8 November 2025
17:00 GST (UTC+04)

(1 BP) Samoa	48–10	Brazil
Try: Umaga 6' c Sanerivi 18' m Manu (2) 23' c, 57' c Apelu Maliko 28' c Nanai 42' m Mapu 52' c Con: Umaga (5/7) 6', 24', 29', 53', 58'; Pen: Umaga (1/1) 9'	Report	Try: Bastardie 13' m Ferreira 73' m

The Sevens Stadium, Dubai
Referee: Jordan Way (Australia)

Team details

FB	15	Jacob Umaga
RW	14	Latrell Smiler-Ah Kiong		(substituted off) 31'
OC	13	Melani Nanai	(yellow card) 71'
IC	12	Tumua Manu	(yellow card) 11'	(substituted off) 58'
LW	11	Va'a Apelu Maliko
FH	10	Rodney Iona
SH	9	Jonathan Taumateine		(substituted off) 40'
N8	8	Iakopo Mapu
OF	7	Alamanda Motuga		(substituted off) 46'
BF	6	Theo McFarland (c)		(substituted off) 40'
RL	5	Michael Curry
LL	4	Ben Nee-Nee
TP	3	Tietie Tuimauga		(substituted off) 40'
HK	2	Mills Sanerivi		(substituted off) 40'
LP	1	Jarred Adams		(substituted off) 47'
Substitutions:
HK	16	Luteru Tolai		(substituted on) 40'
PR	17	Titi Lamositele		(substituted on) 47'
PR	18	Michael Alaalatoa		(substituted on) 40'
FL	19	Taleni Seu		(substituted on) 40'
FL	20	Niko Jones		(substituted on) 46'
SH	21	Connor Tupai		(substituted on) 40'
CE	22	Faletoi Peni		(substituted on) 58'
CE	23	Lalomilo Lalomilo		(substituted on) 31'
Coach:
Tusi Pisi

FB	15	Lucas Tranquez		(substituted off) 40'
RW	14	Théo Bastardie
OC	13	Lorenzo Massari (c)		(substituted off) 73'
IC	12	Raphael Hollister		(substituted off) 56'	(substituted on) 61'
LW	11	Robert Tenório
FH	10	João Amaral
SH	9	Lucas Spago
N8	8	André Arruda		(substituted off) 67'
OF	7	Matheus Cláudio
BF	6	Adrio de Melo
RL	5	Gabriel Oliveira		(substituted off) 40'
LL	4	Matteo Dell’Acqua		(substituted off) 58'
TP	3	Leonel Moreno		(substituted off) 43'
HK	2	Wilton Rebolo	(yellow card) 51'
LP	1	Caique Segura			(substituted off) 61'
Substitutions:
HK	16	Henrique Ferreira		(substituted on) 43'	(substituted off) 76'
PR	17	Brendon Alves		(substituted on) 56'
PR	18	Vicente Galvão			(substituted on) 76'
LK	19	Ben Donald		(substituted on) 40'
FL	20	Renato Santos		(substituted on) 67'
SH	21	Devon Muller		(substituted on) 58'
FH	22	Thiago Oviedo		(substituted on) 40'
WG	23	Robson Morais		(substituted on) 73'
Coach:
(New Zealand) Josh Reeves

Assistant referees:
Eoghan Cross (Ireland)
Griffin Colby (South Africa)
Television match official:
Brett Cronan (Australia)

Notes:

- Mills Sanerivi, Faletoi Peni and Va'a Apelu Maliko (all Samoa) made their international debuts.
- This was the first meeting between these two nations.

8 November 2025
19:30 GST (UTC+04)

Belgium	22–15	Namibia (1 BP)
Try: Declercq 2' c Berger 27' c Decubber 63' c Con: Remue (2/3) 3', 28'; Pen: Remue (1/1) 17'	Report	Try: Luttig 78' c Deysel 80+3' m Con: Loubser (1/2) 79'; Pen: van der Berg (1/1) 37'

The Sevens Stadium, Dubai
Referee: Craig Evans (Wales)

Team details

FB	15	Siméon Soenen		(substituted off) 63'	(substituted on) 75'
RW	14	Ervin Muric		(substituted off) 70'
OC	13	Florian Remue		(substituted off) 48'	(substituted on) 62'
IC	12	Maxime Vacquier
LW	11	Thomas Wallraf			(substituted off) 80'
FH	10	Matias Remue
SH	9	Julien Berger		(substituted off) 59'
N8	8	Felipe Geraghty		(substituted off) 69'
OF	7	William Van Bost
BF	6	Jean-Maurice Decubber (c)
RL	5	Maximilien Hendrickx		(substituted off) 59'
LL	4	Toon Deceuninck
TP	3	Jean-Baptiste de Clercq		(substituted off) 59'
HK	2	Alexandre Raynier		(substituted off) 59'	(substituted on) 80'
LP	1	Charlesty Berguet		(substituted off) 65'
Substitutions:
HK	16	Vincent Tauzia	(yellow card) 78'	(substituted on) 65'
PR	17	Bruno Vliegen		(substituted on) 59'
PR	18	Maxime Jadot		(substituted on) 59'
FL	19	Maurice Fromont		(substituted on) 59'
FL	20	Jérémie Brasseur		(substituted on) 69'
SH	21	Isaac Montoisy		(substituted on) 59'
FH	22	Hugo De Francq	(yellow card) 50'	(substituted on) 48'	(substituted off) 62'	(substituted on) 70'
WG	23	Dazzy Cornez		(substituted on) 63'	(substituted off) 75'
Coach:
Laurent Dossat

FB	15	Jay-Cee Nel
RW	14	Divan Rossouw
OC	13	Johan Deysel
IC	12	Danco Burger	(substituted off) 55'
LW	11	J. C. Greyling
FH	10	André van den Berg	(substituted off) 50'	(substituted on) 55'
SH	9	TC Kisting	(substituted off) 69'
N8	8	Adriaan Booysen	(substituted off) 61'
OF	7	Max Katjijeko
BF	6	Wian Conradie	(substituted off) 59'	(substituted on) 61'
RL	5	Tiaan de Klerk	(substituted off) 40'
LL	4	Adriaan Ludick		(substituted off) 61'
TP	3	Haitembu Shikufa	(substituted off) 35'
HK	2	Louis van der Westhuizen (c)	(substituted off) 6'	(substituted on) 16'	(substituted off) 65'
LP	1	Otja Auala	(substituted off) 59'
Substitutions:
HK	16	Torsten van Jaarsveld	(substituted on) 6'	(substituted off) 16'	(substituted on) 65'
PR	17	Gianluca Savoldelli	(substituted on) 59'
PR	18	Aranos Coetzee	(substituted on) 35'
LK	19	Johan Retief	(substituted on) 40'
FL	20	Prince ǃGaoseb	(substituted on) 59'
FL	21	Johan Luttig	(substituted on) 51'
SH	22	Jacques Theron	(substituted on) 69'
FH	23	Cliven Loubser	(substituted on) 50'
Coach:
(South Africa) Pieter Rossouw

Assistant referees:
Damián Schneider (Argentina)
Griffin Colby (South Africa)
Television match official:
Brett Cronan (Australia)

Notes:

- Gianluca Savoldelli (Namibia) made his international debut.
- This was the first meeting between these two nations.

==== Round 2 ====
13 November 2025
17:00 GST (UTC+04)

(1 BP) Belgium	30–27	Brazil (1 BP)
Try: Berguet 2' c Decubber 11' c Remue 68' m Jadot 79' m Con: Remue (2/4) 3', 12'; Pen: Remue (2/3) 58', 62'	Report	Try: Dell’Acqua 35' c Rosetti 48' c Moreno 73' c Con: Oviedo (1/1) 36'; Tranquez (2/2) 49', 74'; Pen: Oviedo (1/1) 42'; Tranquez (1/1) 65'

The Sevens Stadium, Dubai
Referee: Eoghan Cross (Ireland)

Team details

FB	15	Siméon Soenen
RW	14	Ervin Muric		(substituted off) 17'	(substituted on) 31'
OC	13	Florian Remue
IC	12	Maxime Vacquier
LW	11	Thomas Wallraf		(substituted off) 54'
FH	10	Matias Remue
SH	9	Julien Berger		(substituted off) 54'
N8	8	Felipe Geraghty		(substituted off) 59'
OF	7	William Van Bost
BF	6	Jean-Maurice Decubber (c)
RL	5	Maximilien Hendrickx		(substituted off) 54'
LL	4	Toon Deceuninck	(yellow card) 47'
TP	3	Jean-Baptiste de Clercq		(substituted off) 69'
HK	2	Alexandre Raynier		(substituted off) 69'
LP	1	Charlesty Berguet	(red card) 51'
Substitutions:
PR	16	Basile van Parys			(substituted on) 55'
HK	17	Vincent Tauzia		(substituted on) 69'
PR	18	Maxime Jadot		(substituted on) 69'
LK	19	Maurice Fromont		(substituted on) 54'	(substituted off) 55'
FL	20	Jérémie Brasseur		(substituted on) 59'
SH	21	Isaac Montoisy		(substituted on) 54'
WG	22	Dazzy Cornez		(substituted on) 17'	(substituted off) 31'
SH	23	Timothé Rifon		(substituted on) 54'
Coach:
Laurent Dossat

FB	15	Thiago Oviedo
RW	14	Théo Bastardie
OC	13	Lorenzo Massari (c)
IC	12	Raphael Hollister	(substituted off) 46'
LW	11	Robert Tenório
FH	10	João Amaral
SH	9	Lucas Spago
N8	8	André Arruda
OF	7	Matheus Cláudio	(substituted off) 69'
BF	6	Adrio de Melo
RL	5	Gabriel Oliveira	(substituted off) 40'
LL	4	Matteo Dell’Acqua	(substituted off) 55'
TP	3	Wilton Rebolo	(substituted off) 48'
HK	2	Henrique Ferreira	(substituted off) 40'
LP	1	Caique Segura	(substituted off) 69'
Substitutions:
HK	16	Yan Rosetti	(substituted on) 48'
PR	17	Brendon Alves	(substituted on) 69'
PR	18	Leonel Moreno	(substituted on) 40'
LK	19	Ben Donald	(substituted on) 40'
FL	20	Hélder Lúcio	(substituted on) 69'
FL	21	Devon Muller	(substituted on) 55'
SH	22	Gustavo Gobeti
FB	23	Lucas Tranquez	(substituted on) 46'
Coach:
(New Zealand) Josh Reeves

Assistant referees:
Jordan Way (Australia)
Griffin Colby (South Africa)
Television match official:
Brett Cronan (Australia)

Notes:

- André Arruda (Brazil) earned his 50th test cap.
- This was Belgium's first win over Brazil.

13 November 2025
19:30 GST (UTC+04)

(1 BP) Samoa	26–8	Namibia
Try: Taumateine 4' c Smiler-Ah Kiong 9' c Maliko 24' m Motuga 54' c Con: Umaga (3/4) 5', 10', 55'	Report	Try: Nel 70' m Pen: Loubser (1/1) 44'

The Sevens Stadium, Dubai
Referee: Damián Schneider (Argentina)

Team details

FB	15	Jacob Umaga
RW	14	Latrell Smiler-Ah Kiong
OC	13	Tumua Manu	(substituted off) 58'
IC	12	Lalomilo Lalomilo
LW	11	Va'a Apelu Maliko	(substituted off) 52'
FH	10	Rodney Iona
SH	9	Jonathan Taumateine	(substituted off) 52'
N8	8	Iakopo Mapu	(substituted off) 58'
OF	7	Alamanda Motuga
BF	6	Miracle Faiʻilagi
RL	5	Theo McFarland (c)	(substituted off) 58'
LL	4	Taleni Seu
TP	3	Tietie Tuimauga	(substituted off) 52'
HK	2	Sama Malolo	(substituted off) 52'
LP	1	Scott Sio	(substituted off) 52'
Substitutions:
HK	16	Mills Sanerivi	(substituted on) 52'
PR	17	Titi Lamositele	(substituted on) 52'
PR	18	Michael Alaalatoa	(substituted on) 52'
LK	19	Ben Nee-Nee	(substituted on) 58'
FL	20	Abraham Papali'i	(substituted on) 58'
SH	21	Connor Tupai	(substituted on) 52'
CE	22	Faletoi Peni	(substituted on) 58'
FB	23	Tuna Tuitama	(substituted on) 52'
Coach:
Tusi Pisi

FB	15	Divan Rossouw	(substituted off) 58'
RW	14	Danie van der Merwe
OC	13	Jay-Cee Nel
IC	12	Johan Deysel
LW	11	J. C. Greyling	(substituted off) 62'
FH	10	Cliven Loubser
SH	9	TC Kisting	(substituted off) 59'
N8	8	Adriaan Booysen	(substituted off) 52'
OF	7	Max Katjijeko
BF	6	Prince ǃGaoseb	(substituted off) 59'
RL	5	Johan Retief
LL	4	Adriaan Ludick	(substituted off) 52'
TP	3	Aranos Coetzee	(substituted off) 77'
HK	2	Louis van der Westhuizen (c)
LP	1	Otja Auala	(substituted off) 56'
Substitutions:
HK	16	Torsten van Jaarsveld	(substituted on) 59'
PR	17	Gianluca Savoldelli	(substituted on) 56'
PR	18	Haitembu Shikufa	(substituted on) 77'
FL	19	Johan Luttig	(substituted on) 52'
FL	20	Wian Conradie	(substituted on) 52'
SH	21	AJ Kearns	(substituted on) 59'
FH	22	André van den Berg	(substituted on) 62'
WG	23	Jürgen Meyer	(substituted on) 62'
Coach:
(South Africa) Pieter Rossouw

Assistant referees:
Craig Evans (Wales)
Griffin Colby (South Africa)
Television match official:
Brett Cronan (Australia)

Notes:

- Scott Sio (Samoa) made his international debut for Samoa, having previously played for Australia.
- With this loss, Namibia failed to qualify for the World Cup for the first time since 1995, and the second time in their history of entering qualification.

==== Round 3 ====
18 November 2025
17:00 GST (UTC+04)

(1 BP) Namibia	40–31	Brazil (1 BP)
Try: Bester 21' c Meyer (2) 28' c, 56' c Ludick 37' c van der Merwe 44' c Nel 67' m Con: Loubser (5/6) 22', 29', 37', 45', 57'	Report	Try: Tranquez 9' c Moreno 16' c Massari 25' m Cláudio 78' c Con: Tranquez (4/4) 10', 17', 26', 78'; Pen: Tranquez (1/1) 6'

The Sevens Stadium, Dubai
Referee: Jordan Way (Australia)

Team details

FB	15	Jay-Cee Nel
RW	14	Danie van der Merwe		(substituted off) 68'
OC	13	André van den Berg
IC	12	Johan Deysel
LW	11	Jürgen Meyer
FH	10	Cliven Loubser
SH	9	TC Kisting		(substituted off) 40'
N8	8	Wian Conradie		(substituted off) 66'
OF	7	Max Katjijeko		(substituted off) 66'
BF	6	Prince ǃGaoseb		(substituted off) 54'
RL	5	Johan Retief
LL	4	Adriaan Ludick
TP	3	Joshua Bester		(substituted off) 57'
HK	2	Louis van der Westhuizen (c)	(yellow card) 77'
LP	1	Otja Auala		(substituted off) 66'
Substitutions:
HK	16	Armand Combrinck		(substituted off) 66'
PR	17	Haitembu Shikufa		(substituted off) 66'
PR	18	Aranos Coetzee		(substituted off) 30'
FL	19	Johan Luttig		(substituted off) 57'
FL	20	Riaan Grové		(substituted off) 66'
SH	21	Jacques Theron		(substituted off) 40'
FB	22	Aston Mukwiilongo		(substituted off) 68'
FL	23	Adriaan Booysen		(substituted off) 54'
Coach:
(South Africa) Pieter Rossouw

FB	15	Lucas Tranquez
RW	14	Lorenzo Massari (c)
OC	13	Raphael Hollister
IC	12	Robert Tenório	(yellow card) 55'	(substituted off) 65'
LW	11	Sérgio Luna	(red card) 38'
FH	10	João Amaral
SH	9	Lucas Spago		(substituted off) 68'
N8	8	André Arruda
OF	7	Devon Muller		(substituted off) 62'
BF	6	Adrio de Melo		(substituted off) 51'
RL	5	Ben Donald
LL	4	Matteo Dell’Acqua		(substituted off) 62'
TP	3	Leonel Moreno		(substituted off) 54'
HK	2	Wilton Rebolo		(substituted off) 40'
LP	1	João Lucas Marino		(substituted off) 47'
Substitutions:
HK	16	Yan Rosetti		(substituted on) 40'
PR	17	Brendon Alves		(substituted on) 47'
PR	18	Vicente Galvão		(substituted on) 54'
FL	19	Hélder Lúcio		(substituted on) 62'
FL	20	Matheus Cláudio		(substituted on) 51'
FL	21	Renato Santos		(substituted on) 62'
SH	22	Gustavo Gobeti		(substituted on) 68'
CE	23	Moisés Duque		(substituted on) 65'
Coach:
(New Zealand) Josh Reeves

Assistant referees:
Eoghan Cross (Ireland)
Griffin Colby (South Africa)
Television match official:
Brett Cronan (Australia)

Notes:

- Joshua Bester (Namibia) made his international debut.
- This was the first meeting between these two nations.

18 November 2025
19:30 GST (UTC+04)

Samoa	13–13	Belgium
Try: Papali'i 63' c Con: Umaga (1/1) 64'; Pen: Umaga (2/4) 8', 70'	Report	Try: Decubber 73' c Con: Remue (1/1) 74'; Pen: Remue (2/3) 12', 33'

The Sevens Stadium, Dubai
Referee: Craig Evans (Wales)

Team details

FB	15	Jacob Umaga
RW	14	Latrell Smiler-Ah Kiong
OC	13	Melani Nanai
IC	12	Lalomilo Lalomilo		(substituted off) 67'
LW	11	Va'a Apelu Maliko		(substituted off) 61'
FH	10	Rodney Iona
SH	9	Jonathan Taumateine		(substituted off) 58'
N8	8	Iakopo Mapu		(substituted off) 56'
OF	7	Niko Jones	(yellow card) 12'
BF	6	Miracle Faiʻilagi
RL	5	Theo McFarland (c)
LL	4	Ben Nee-Nee		(substituted off) 49'
TP	3	Michael Alaalatoa		(substituted off) 47'
HK	2	Mills Sanerivi		(substituted off) 47'
LP	1	Titi Lamositele		(substituted off) 47'
Substitutions:
HK	16	Sama Malolo		(substituted on) 47'
PR	17	Scott Sio		(substituted on) 47'
PR	18	Tietie Tuimauga		(substituted on) 47'
FL	19	Taleni Seu		(substituted on) 49'
FL	20	Abraham Papali'i		(substituted on) 56'
SH	21	Connor Tupai		(substituted on) 58'
CE	22	Faletoi Peni		(substituted on) 67'
FB	23	Tuna Tuitama		(substituted on) 61'
Coach:
Tusi Pisi

FB	15	Siméon Soenen
RW	14	Isaac Montoisy	(yellow card) 33'	(substituted off) 71'
OC	13	Florian Remue
IC	12	Maxime Vacquier
LW	11	Ervin Muric
FH	10	Matias Remue
SH	9	Julien Berger		(substituted off) 65'
N8	8	Felipe Geraghty
OF	7	William Van Bost		(substituted off) 57'
BF	6	Jean-Maurice Decubber (c)		(substituted off) 77'
RL	5	Maximilien Hendrickx
LL	4	Toon Deceuninck		(substituted off) 71'
TP	3	Jean-Baptiste de Clercq
HK	2	Alexandre Raynier		(substituted off) 61'
LP	1	Bruno Vliegen		(substituted off) 26'
Substitutions:
PR	16	Basile van Parys		(substituted on) 26'	(substituted off) 56'
HK	17	Vincent Tauzia		(substituted on) 61'
PR	18	Maxime Jadot			(substituted on) 56'
LK	19	Arthur Smeets		(substituted on) 71'
FL	20	Jérémie Brasseur		(substituted on) 57'
WG	21	Thomas Wallraf		(substituted on) 71'
SH	22	Timothé Rifon		(substituted on) 65'
WG	23	Dazzy Cornez		(substituted on) 77'
Coach:
Laurent Dossat

Assistant referees:
Damián Schneider (Argentina)
Griffin Colby (South Africa)
Television match official:
Brett Cronan (Australia)

Notes:

- This was the first draw between the two sides.

== See also ==
- 2027 Men's Rugby World Cup
