= 2027 Men's Rugby World Cup – Africa qualification =

Tournament details
- Dates: 20 July 2024 – 19 July 2025
- No. of nations: 16

The qualifying process for the 2027 Men's Rugby World Cup for African teams began in July 2024, with 16 teams competing for one qualification spot (Africa 1) into the final tournament and one spot in a play-off match (Africa 2).

The African qualifying process concluded in July 2025, with Zimbabwe qualifying for the World Cup as Africa 1, which saw the Sables return to the World Cup for the first time since 1991.

== Format ==
The Rugby Africa Cup, governed by Rugby Africa, was the regional qualification tournament for Rugby World Cup 2027, with the top two divisions in the region acting as the process.

Qualification took place over three rounds;

- Round 1 was the 2024 Rugby Africa Cup, where the top eight African nations (excluding South Africa) played in a straight knock-out format to determine seedings (1–7) for the third round of the qualification process. The bottom placed side at the end of the first round, was eliminated from qualification.
- Round 2 was a repechage round between the eight development African nations, which saw the winner progress to the third round of the regional qualification as eighth seed replacing the eliminated team from round 1.
- Round 3 was the 2025 Rugby Africa Cup, where the eight competing teams faced each other in a straight knock-out format based on their seedings in 2024; 1 v 8, 2 v 7, 3 v 6, 4 v 5. The winner of this round qualified for the Rugby World Cup as Africa 1, whilst the runner-up advanced to a play-off match against Asia 2 to decide who progresses to the Final Qualification Tournament.

== Entrants ==
Eight teams competed during the Africa qualifiers for the 2027 Rugby World Cup, with South Africa the only team qualified from the Region prior to the qualification process.

(Rankings as of first qualification match in this region)

Nation	Rank	Began play	Qualifying status
Algeria	59	20 July 2024	Eliminated by Namibia on 13 July 2025
Botswana	77	20 November 2024	Eliminated by Morocco on 20 November 2024
Burkina Faso	92	20 July 2024	Eliminated by Ivory Coast on 28 July 2024
Cameroon	108	20 November 2024	Eliminated by Madagascar on 20 November 2024
Ghana	87	18 December 2024	Eliminated by Zambia on 18 December 2024
Ivory Coast	62	20 July 2024	Eliminated by Algeria on 8 July 2025
Kenya	34	20 July 2024	Eliminated by Zimbabwe on 13 July 2025
Morocco	39	20 November 2024	Eliminated by Zimbabwe on 8 July 2025
Madagascar	48	20 November 2024	Eliminated by Morocco on 24 November 2024
Namibia	26	20 July 2024	Advances to Asia / Africa play-off as Africa 2 on 19 July 2025
Nigeria	69	18 December 2024	Eliminated by Tunisia on 18 December 2024
Senegal	56	20 July 2024	Eliminated by Namibia on 8 July 2025
South Africa	1	N/A	Qualified with Top 12 finish at 2023 World Cup
Tunisia	46	18 December 2024	Eliminated by Morocco on 9 February 2025
Uganda	43	20 July 2024	Eliminated by Kenya on 8 July 2025
Zambia	68	18 December 2024	Eliminated by Tunisia on 22 December 2024
Zimbabwe	27	20 July 2024	Qualified as Africa 1 on 19 July 2025

== Round 1: 2024 Rugby Africa Cup ==
The first round was a straight knock-out tournament held from 20 to 28 July 2024 in Kampala, Uganda.

Burkina Faso finished bottom and were therefore eliminated, whilst the remaining seven teams advancing to the third round.

=== Bracket ===
Quarter-finals
Namibia	38
Burkina Faso	5
Zimbabwe	22
Uganda	20
Kenya	36
Senegal	17
Algeria	32
Ivory Coast	12

Semi-finals
Namibia	10
Zimbabwe	32
Kenya	12
Algeria	20

Final
Zimbabwe	29
Algeria	3
Third place
Namibia	38
Kenya	27

=== Quarter-finals ===
20 July 2024
10:00

Namibia	38–5	Burkina Faso
	Report

Mandela National Stadium, Kampala
Referee: Precious Pazani (Zimbabwe)

20 July 2024
12:00

Kenya	36–17	Senegal
	Report

Mandela National Stadium, Kampala
Referee: Ben Connor (Wales)

20 July 2024
14:00

Algeria	32–12	Ivory Coast
	Report

Mandela National Stadium, Kampala
Referee: Julien Caulier (France)

20 July 2024
16:00

Zimbabwe	22–20	Uganda
	Report

Mandela National Stadium, Kampala
Referee: Benjamin Beuriot (France)

=== Semi-finals ===
24 July 2024
14:00

Kenya	12–20	Algeria
	Report

Mandela National Stadium, Kampala
Referee: Julien Caulier (France)

24 July 2024
16:00

Namibia	10–32	Zimbabwe
	Report

Mandela National Stadium, Kampala
Referee: Ben Connor (Wales)

=== Third place match ===
28 July 2024
14:00

Kenya	27–38	Namibia
	Report

Mandela National Stadium, Kampala
Referee: Talent Gandiwa (Zimbabwe)

=== Final ===
28 July 2024
16:00

Zimbabwe	29–3	Algeria
	Report

Mandela National Stadium, Kampala
Referee: Julien Caulier (France)

=== Ranking matches ===
Semi-finals
Uganda	25
Burkina Faso	15
Senegal	25
Ivory Coast	8

5th/6th
Uganda	34
Senegal	31
7th/8th
Ivory Coast	23
Burkina Faso	10

==== Semi-finals ====
24 July 2024
10:00

Senegal	25–8	Ivory Coast
	Report

Mandela National Stadium, Kampala
Referee: Stéphane Rakotonirainy (Madagascar)

24 July 2024
12:00

Uganda	25–15	Burkina Faso
	Report

Mandela National Stadium, Kampala
Referee: Nicardo Pienaar (Namibia)

==== 5th/6th play-off ====
28 July 2024
12:00

Uganda	34–31	Senegal
	Report

Mandela National Stadium, Kampala
Referee: Zaid Isaaccs (Namibia)

==== Relegation play-off ====
28 July 2024
10:00

Ivory Coast	23–10	Burkina Faso
	Report

Mandela National Stadium, Kampala
Referee: Benjamin Beuriot (France)

=== Final standings ===
Pos.	Team	Notes
1	Zimbabwe	
2	Algeria	
3	Namibia	
4	Kenya	
5	Uganda	
6	Senegal	
7	Ivory Coast	
8	Burkina Faso	Eliminated

== Round 2: 2024 Rugby Africa Repechage ==
=== Pool A ===
Pool A was a knock-out tournament held between the 18–22 December 2024 in Jemmal, Tunisia.

Tunisia won the pool and advanced to the Repechage Final, whilst Ghana, Nigeria and Zambia were eliminated.

Semi-finals
Tunisia	34
Nigeria	10
Zambia	31
Ghana	22

Final
Tunisia	29
Zambia	7
Third place
Nigeria	19
Ghana	24

==== Semi-finals ====
18 December 2024
11:00

Zambia	31–22	Ghana
	Report

Stade Municipal de Jemmal, Jemmal
Referee: Zaid Isaacs (Namibia)

18 December 2024
14:00

Tunisia	34–10	Nigeria
	Report

Stade Municipal de Jemmal, Jemmal
Referee: Sylvain Mane (Senegal)

==== Third place match ====
22 December 2024
11:00

Nigeria	19–24	Ghana
	Report

Stade Municipal de Jemmal, Jemmal
Referee: Victor Oduor (Kenya)

==== Final ====
22 December 2024
14:00

Tunisia	29–7	Zambia
	Report

Stade Municipal de Jemmal, Jemmal
Referee: Precious Pazani (Zimbabwe)

=== Pool B ===
Pool B was a knock-out tournament held between the 20–24 November 2024 in Casablanca, Morocco.

Morocco won the pool and advanced to the Repechage Final, whilst Botswana, Cameroon and Madagascar were eliminated.

Semi-finals
Madagascar	33
Cameroon	7
Morocco	64
Botswana	0

Final
Morocco	53
Madagascar	37
Third place
Botswana	36
Cameroon	10

==== Semi-finals ====
20 November 2024
13:00

Morocco	64–0	Botswana
	Report

Stade du COC, Casablanca
Referee: Talent Gandiwa (Zimbabwe)

20 November 2024
15:30

Madagascar	33–7	Cameroon
	Report

Stade du COC, Casablanca
Referee: Zaid Isaacs (Namibia)

==== Third place match ====
24 November 2024
10:00

Botswana	36–10	Cameroon

Stade du COC, Casablanca
Referee: Talent Gandiwa (Zimbabwe)

==== Final ====
24 November 2024
13:00

Morocco	53–37	Madagascar

Stade du COC, Casablanca
Referee: Nicardo Pienaar (Namibia)

=== Repechage Final ===
Morocco won the repechage match to progress to the third round, whilst Tunisia were eliminated.

9 February 2025
16:00

Morocco	26–12	Tunisia
	Report

Père Jégo Stadium, Casablanca
Referee: Zaid Isaacs (Namibia)

== Round 3: 2025 Rugby Africa Cup ==
The third round saw a straight knockout format based on final positions in the first round, with the winner qualifying for the World Cup as Africa 1, whilst the runner-up (Africa 2) progressed to an Asia / Africa play-off match against Asia 2 (United Arab Emirates) to decide who plays in the Final Qualification Tournament.

Like the first round, Kampala, Uganda hosted the tournament between 8 and 19 July 2025.

Zimbabwe won the 2025 Rugby Africa Cup to qualify for the World Cup, whilst runners-up Namibia advanced to the cross-regional play-offs. Algeria, Ivory Coast, Kenya, Morocco, Senegal and Uganda were eliminated.

=== Bracket ===
Quarter-finals
Algeria	41
Ivory Coast	6
Namibia	55
Senegal	17
Zimbabwe	43
Morocco	8
Kenya	32
Uganda	24

Semi-finals
Algeria	7
Namibia	21
Zimbabwe	29
Kenya	23

Final
Namibia	28
Zimbabwe	30
Third place
Algeria	15
Kenya	5

=== Quarter-finals ===
8 July 2025
10:00

Zimbabwe	43–8	Morocco
Try: Mafura 22' c Sigauke 60' c Gurwe 68' c Utete 75' c Con: Prior (4/4) 23', 60', 68', 76'; Pen: Prior (4/4) 10', 16', 40', 58'	Report; WR details	Try: Achahbar 3' m Pen: Khattabi (1/1) 64'; Cards: Achahbar (yellow card) 73'

Mandela National Stadium, Kampala
Referee: Zaid Isaacs (Namibia)

8 July 2025
12:00

Algeria	41–6	Ivory Coast
Try: Queheille 37' m Penalty try 46'; Megdoud (2) 53' m, 66' c Makri 59' c Tronc 79' c Con: Caminati (3/5) 59', 66', 80'; Pen: Caminati (1/3) 24'	Report; WR details	Pen: Traore (2/2) 30', 40'; Cards: Martin (yellow card) 13'; Diomande (yellow card) 36'; Traore (yellow card) 46'

Mandela National Stadium, Kampala
Referee: Anthony Diaz (France)

8 July 2025
14:00

Namibia	55–17	Senegal
Try: Retief 6' c Meyer 35' c van den Berg 50' c Ludick 58' c Combrinck 68' c Kearns 73' m Malan 77' c Booysen 80' m Con: Swanepoel (2/2) 7', 36'; Loubser (4/6) 51', 58', 69', 78'; Pen: Swanepoel (1/1) 28'	Report; WR details	Try: Fofana 39' c Soumah (2) 42' m, 54' m Con: Sakho (1/3) 40'

Mandela National Stadium, Kampala
Referee: Paul Mente (South Africa)

8 July 2025
16:00

Kenya	32–24	Uganda
Try: Chao (2) 20' m, 63' c Young 33' c Nyambua 58' c Con: Ejakait (1/2) 34'; Tavaga (2/2) 59', 64'; Drop: Young (2/2) 44', 78'	Report; WR details	Try: Ofoyrwoth 37' c Wokorach 69' c Oketayot 72' c Con: Wokorach (3/3) 38', 69', 73'; Pen: Wokorach (1/3) 51'

Mandela National Stadium, Kampala
Referee: Sylvain Mane (Senegal)

=== Semi-finals ===
13 July 2025
14:00

Algeria	7–21	Namibia
Try: Makri 17' c Con: Caminati (1/1) 17'	Report; WR Report	Try: ǃGaoseb 24' m Loubser 28' c Con: Loubser (1/2) 28'; Pen: Loubser (4/4) 13', 29', 46', 50'; Cards: Hardwick (yellow card) 71'

Mandela National Stadium, Kampala
Referee: Sylvain Mane (Senegal)

13 July 2025
16:00

Zimbabwe	29–23	Kenya
Try: Mudzekenyedzi 3' m Mudariki 22' m Fraser 63' c Con: Prior (1/2) 64'; Pen: Prior (3/3) 14', 75', 77'; Drop: Prior (1/1) 69'	Report; WR details	Try: Sifuna 6' m Chao 40' c Tavaga 80' m Con: Tavaga (1/3) 40'; Pen: Tavaga (2/2) 21', 27'; Cards: Chao (yellow card) 17'

Mandela National Stadium, Kampala
Referee: Ronald Wutimber (Uganda)

=== Third place match ===
19 July 2025
12:00

Algeria	15–5	Kenya
Try: Caminati 2' m Djebbari 21' c Con: Kralfa (1/2) 22'; Drop: Kralfa (1/1) 72'; Cards: Macani (yellow card) 28'; Djebbari (yellow card) 36'	Report; WR details	Try: Akala 10' m

Mandela National Stadium, Kampala
Referee: Talent Gandiwa (Zimbabwe)

=== Final: Africa 1 play-off ===
19 July 2025
16:00

Namibia	28–30	Zimbabwe
Try: ǃGaoseb 35' c Nel 61' m Swanepoel 71' c Con: Loubser (1/1) 35'; Swanepoel (1/1) 71'; Pen: Loubser (3/3) 4', 10', 21'	Report; WR details	Try: Mashawi 18' c Muzanargwo 44' c Mudzekenyedzi 59' c Con: Prior (3/3) 18', 45', 60'; Pen: Prior (3/4) 8', 13', 26'

Mandela National Stadium, Kampala
Referee: Paul Mente (South Africa)

Team details

FB	15	Cliven Loubser
RW	14	Jay-Cee Nel
OC	13	Le Roux Malan
IC	12	Danco Burger
LW	11	Jurgen Meyer
FH	10	André van den Berg		(substituted off) 62'
SH	9	Jacques Theron	(yellow card) 23'	(substituted off) 47'
N8	8	Richard Hardwick
OF	7	Wian Conradie		(substituted off) 61'
BF	6	Prince ǃGaoseb (c)		(substituted off) 55'
RL	5	Tiaan de Klerk
LL	4	Adriaan Ludick		(substituted off) 40'
TP	3	Aranos Coetzee		(substituted off) 76'
HK	2	Louis van der Westhuizen		(substituted off) 72'
LP	1	Otja Auala		(substituted off) 76'
Replacements:
HK	16	Armand Combrinck		(substituted on) 72'
PR	17	Jason Benade		(substituted on) 76'
PR	18	Haitembu Shikufa		(substituted on) 76'
LK	19	Johan Retief		(substituted on) 40'
FL	20	Max Katjijeko		(substituted on) 61'
SH	21	AJ Kearns		(substituted on) 47'
FH	22	Tiaan Swanepoel		(substituted on) 62'
FL	23	Adriaan Booysen		(substituted on) 55'
Coach:
(Namibia) Jacques Burger

FB	15	Tapiwa Mafura
RW	14	Matthew McNab
OC	13	Brandon Mudzekenyedzi
IC	12	Kudzai Mashawi		(substituted off) 55'
LW	11	Edward Sigauke		(substituted off) 70'
FH	10	Ian Prior
SH	9	Hilton Mudariki (c)		(substituted off) 67'
N8	8	Jason Fraser	(yellow card) 33'
OF	7	Dylan Utete		(substituted off) 50'
BF	6	Tinotenda Mavesere
RL	5	Simba Siraha
LL	4	Godfrey Muzanargwo
TP	3	Cleopas Kundiona		(substituted off) 63'
HK	2	Simba Mandioma		(substituted off) 71'	(substituted on) 77'
LP	1	Victor Mupunga		(substituted off) 73'
Replacements:
HK	16	Liam Larkan		(substituted on) 71'	(substituted off) 77'
PR	17	Tyran Fagan		(substituted on) 73'
PR	18	Bornwell Gwinji		(substituted on) 63'
LK	19	Tadiwanashe Gwashu
FL	20	Aiden Burnett		(substituted on) 50'
SH	21	Keegan Joubert		(substituted on) 67'
CE	22	Dion Khumalo		(substituted on) 70'
FH	23	Bruce Houston		(substituted on) 55'
Coach:
(Zimbabwe) Piet Bienade

Assistant referees:
Sylvain Mane (Senegal)
Ronald Wutimber (Uganda)

=== Ranking matches ===
Semi-finals
Ivory Coast	3
Senegal	28
Morocco	24
Uganda	12

5th/6th
Senegal (a.s.d)	33
Morocco	28
7th/8th
Ivory Coast	17
Uganda	37

==== Semi-finals ====
13 July 2025
10:00

Ivory Coast	3–28	Senegal
Pen: Traore (1/2) 3'; Cards: Kone (yellow card) 30'; Martin (yellow card) 31'; Coulibaly (yellow card) 46'	Report; WR details	Try: Hounkpatin 19' c Fofana 31' c Mendy 79' m Con: Sall (2/3) 20', 33'; Pen: Sall (3/4) 20', 60', 74'; Cards: Correa (yellow card) 45'

Mandela National Stadium, Kampala
Referee: Stéphane Rakotonirainy (Madagascar)

13 July 2025
12:00

Morocco	24–12	Uganda
Try: Elkhaoulani 14' c Bachiri 20' c Qadiri 54' m Fadli 69' m Con: El Kadri (2/3) 14', 22'; Cards: Youmouri (yellow card) 23'; Achahbar (yellow card) 64'	Report; WR details	Try: Wokorach (2) 65' m, 77' c Con: Wokorach (1/2) 77'; Cards: Oketayot (yellow card) 68'

Mandela National Stadium, Kampala
Referee: Benjamin Beuriot (France)

==== 5th/6th play-off ====
19 July 2025
10:00

Senegal	33–28 (a.s.d)	Morocco
Try: Cisse 5' m Niang 53' c Kane 78' c Ndiaye 99'; Con: Sakho (2/2) 53', 78'; Pen: Sall (1/1) 40'; Sakho (1/1) 40', 72'; Cards: Silla (yellow card) 27'; Cisse (yellow card) 80+2'	Report; WR details	Try: Hou 38' c Qadiri 63' m El Khattabi 80+3' c Con: El Khattabi (2/3) 38', 80+3'; Pen: El Khattabi (3/3) 30', 42', 74'; Cards: El Ansari (yellow card) 46'; Jnaoui (yellow card) 51'

Mandela National Stadium, Kampala
Referee: Benjamin Beuriot (France)

==== 7th/8th play-off ====
19 July 2025
14:00

Ivory Coast	17–37	Uganda
Try: Kone 15' m Coulibaly 38' m Houtou 57' c Con: Nacanabo (1/1) 58'; Cards: Anokoua (yellow card) 12'; Bassono (yellow card) 67'	Report; WR details	Try: Aturinda 18' m Kasito 29' c Jadwong 44' c Kisiga 46' c Munyani 70' m Con: Wokorach (1/2) 30'; Walker (2/3) 44', 47'; Pen: Walker (2/2) 60', 67'

Mandela National Stadium, Kampala
Referee: Nicardo Pienaar (Namibia)

=== Final standings ===
Pos.	Team	Qualification
1st place, gold medalist(s)	Zimbabwe	Qualified for the 2027 Men's Rugby World Cup
2nd place, silver medalist(s)	Namibia	Qualified for the 2027 Men's Rugby World Cup – Regional play-off
3rd place, bronze medalist(s)	Algeria	Eliminated
4	Kenya	Eliminated
5	Senegal	Eliminated
6	Morocco	Eliminated
7	Uganda	Eliminated
8	Ivory Coast	Eliminated

== See also ==
- 2027 Men's Rugby World Cup
