= 2019 World Rugby Nations Cup =

2019 rugby union tournament for national teams

Tournament details
- Countries: Argentina XV; Namibia; Russia; Uruguay
- Tournament format(s): Round-robin
- Date: 4 – 15 June 2019

Tournament statistics
- Teams: 4
- Matches played: 6

Final
- Champions: Uruguay (3rd title)
- Runners-up: Russia

The 2019 World Rugby Nations Cup was the fourteenth edition of the World Rugby Nations Cup rugby union tournament, created by World Rugby.

Like in 2018, the tournament featured 4 teams. Argentina XV and Uruguay remained from the previous year, with Namibia and Russia returning to the competition after not participating in 2018.

Hosts Uruguay won the tournament for the third year in a row, having triumphed in 2017 and 2018.

As of 2023 this is the most recent edition of the World Rugby Nations Cup to take place.

== Teams ==
Below are the competing teams with their World Rugby Rankings as of the first tournament date (4 June 2019):

- Argentina XV (n/a)
- Namibia (23)
- Russia (20)
- Uruguay (16)

== Standings ==
	Team	Games				Points			Tries		Bounus points	Points
	Team	Played	Won	Drawn	Lost	For	Against	Difference	For	Against	Bounus points	Points
1	Uruguay	3	2	0	1	104	71	+33	14	9	3	11
2	Russia	3	2	0	1	94	88	+6	12	13	2	10
3	Argentina XV	3	1	0	2	94	101	–7	13	12	2	6
4	Namibia	3	1	0	2	55	87	–32	6	11	0	4
Points breakdown:4 points for a win2 points for a draw1 bonus point for a loss by seven points or less1 bonus point for scoring four or more tries in a match

== Results ==
=== Round 1 ===
4 June 2019
15:30 UYT (UTC-03)

(1 BP) Argentina XV	39–25	Namibia
Try: Montero 28' m Penalty try 40'; Sbrocco 47' c Cordero (2) 52' c, 72' c Con: Castiglioni (2/3) 48', 53'; Roger (1/1) 73'; Pen: Castiglioni (0/1); Roger (2/2) 67', 80'	Report	Try: Nortjé 18' m Mouton 34' c Greyling 42' c Con: Loubser (2/3) 35', 43'; Pen: Loubser (2/3) 61', 70'

Estadio Charrúa, Montevideo
Attendance: 500
Referee: Ben Whitehouse (WRU)

FB	15	Tomás Albornoz	(substituted off) 68'
RW	14	Facundo Cordero
OC	13	Agustín Segura
IC	12	Bautista Ezcurra
LW	11	Manuel Montero	(substituted off) 1'	(substituted on) 9'
FH	10	Teo Castiglioni	(substituted off) 53'
SH	9	Martín Landajo	(substituted off) 73'
N8	8	Santiago Montagner	(substituted off) 40'
OF	7	Lautaro Bavaro (c)
BF	6	Nicolás Sbrocco	(substituted off) 60'
RL	5	Jerónimo Ureta
LL	4	Ignacio Calas
TP	3	Lucas Favre	(substituted off) 68'
HK	2	Jose Luis González	(substituted off) 53'
LP	1	Nicolás Solveyra	(substituted off) 62'
Replacements:
HK	16	Diego Fortuny	(substituted on) 53'
PR	17	Rodrigo Martínez	(substituted on) 62'
PR	18	Luciano Ortíz	(substituted on) 68'
LK	19	Lucas Santa Cruz	(substituted on) 60'
FL	20	Rodrigo Bruni	(substituted on) 40'
SH	21	Manuel Nogués	(substituted on) 73'
FH	22	Martín Roger	(substituted on) 1'	(substituted off) 9'	(substituted on) 53'
WG	23	Tomás Cubilla	(substituted on) 68'
Coach:
(Argentina) Ignacio Fernández Lobbe

FB	15	Johann Tromp	(substituted off) 53'
RW	14	JC Greyling
OC	13	Johan Deysel (c)
IC	12	Darryl de la Harpe	(substituted off) 75'
LW	11	Oderich Mouton
FH	10	Cliven Loubser
SH	9	Eugene Jantjies	(substituted off) 66'
N8	8	Janco Venter
OF	7	Max Katjijeko
BF	6	Thomasau Forbes	(substituted off) 40'	(substituted on) 49'	(substituted off) 66'
RL	5	Tjiuee Uanivi	(substituted off) 73'
LL	4	Johan Retief
TP	3	Aranos Coetzee	(yellow card) 40' to 50'
HK	2	Obert Nortjé
LP	1	Desiderius Sethie	(substituted off) 53'
Replacements:
HK	16	Niel van Vuuren
PR	17	André Rademeyer	(substituted on) 53'
PR	18	AJ De Klerk	(substituted on) 40'	(substituted off) 49'
LK	19	Wian Conradie	(substituted on) 66'
FL	20	Prince !Gaoseb	(substituted on) 73'
SH	21	TC Kisting	(substituted on) 66'
CE	22	Justin Newman	(substituted on) 75'
WG	23	PW Steenkamp	(substituted on) 53'
Coach:
(Wales) Phil Davies

4 June 2019
18:00 UYT (UTC-03)

(1 BP) Uruguay	48–26	Russia (1 BP)
Try: Kessler 1' c Freitas (2) 13' m, 20' c Gaminara 34' c Civetta 55' c Magno 72' c Echeverría 78' m Con: Favaro (5/7) 2', 21', 35', 56', 73'; Pen: Favaro (1/1) (40')	Report	Try: Matveev (3) 5' c, 26' m, 58' c Golosnitskiy 61' c Con: Kushnarev (1/2) 6'; Gaisin (2/2) 59', 62'

Estadio Charrúa, Montevideo
Attendance: 1,200
Referee: Frank Murphy (IRFU)

FB	15	Felipe Etcheverry
RW	14	Federico Favaro
OC	13	Nicolás Freitas
IC	12	Andrés Vilaseca
LW	11	Rodrigo Silva	(substituted off) 73'
FH	10	Juan Manuel Cat
SH	9	Tomás Inciarte	(substituted off) 59'
N8	8	Manuel Diana	(substituted off) 56'
OF	7	Santiago Civetta
BF	6	Juan Manuel Gaminara (c)	(substituted off) 73'
RL	5	Manuel Leindekar
LL	4	Gonzalo Soto Mera	(substituted off) 59'
TP	3	Juan Pedro Rombys	(substituted off) 66'
HK	2	Germán Kessler	(substituted off) 73'
LP	1	Mateo Sanguinetti	(substituted off) 73'
Replacements:
HK	16	Guillermo Pujadas	(substituted on) 73'
PR	17	Facundo Gattas	(substituted on) 73'
PR	18	Juan Echeverría	(substituted on) 66'
LK	19	Diego Magno	(substituted on) 59'
FL	20	Alejandro Nieto	(substituted on) 56'
FL	21	Manuel Ardao	(substituted on) 73'
SH	22	Santiago Arata	(substituted on) 59'
WG	23	Juan Pablo Costabile	(substituted on) 73'
Coach:
(Argentina) Esteban Meneses

FB	15	Vasili Artemiev (c)
RW	14	German Davydov
OC	13	Vladimir Ostroushko
IC	12	Dmitri Gerasimov	(substituted off) 59'
LW	11	Kirill Golosnitskiy
FH	10	Yuri Kushnarev	(substituted off) 54'
SH	9	Dmitri Perov	(substituted off) 59'
N8	8	Viktor Gresev
OF	7	Tagir Gadzhiev
BF	6	Patris Peki	(substituted off) 59'
RL	5	Bogdan Fedotko
LL	4	Evgeny Elgin	(substituted off) 59'
TP	3	Kirill Gotovtsev	(substituted off) 68'
HK	2	Evgeny Matveev	(substituted off) 59'
LP	1	Andrei Polivalov	(substituted off) 59'
Replacements:
PR	16	Sergei Chernyshev	(substituted on) 59'
HK	17	Evgeny Mishechkin	(substituted on) 59'
PR	18	Vladimir Podrezov	(substituted on) 68'
LK	19	Alexander Ilin	(substituted on) 59'
FL	20	Roman Khodin	(substituted on) 59'
SH	21	Vasili Dorofeev	(substituted on) 59'
FH	22	Ramil Gaisin	(substituted on) 54'
WG	23	Vladislav Sozonov	(substituted on) 59'
Coach:
(Wales) Lyn Jones

=== Round 2 ===
9 June 2019
14:00 UYT (UTC-03)

(1 BP) Argentina XV	40–48	Russia (1 BP)
Try: Sbrocco 14' c Ureta 26' c Montagner 52' c Cordero (3) 58' c, 62' c, 72' m Con: Roger (5/6) 15', 27', 53', 59', 63'	Report	Try: Davydov (2) 3' c, 31' c Godlyuk 6' c Golosnitskiy (2) 34' c, 39' c Garbuzov 43' c Con: Gaisin (6/6) 4', 7', 32', 35', 40', 44'; Pen: Gaisin (1/1) 12'; Yanyushkin (1/1) 76'

Estadio Charrúa, Montevideo
Attendance: 500
Referee: Francisco González (URU)

FB	15	Facundo Cordero
RW	14	Julián Domínguez
OC	13	Tomás Cubilla
IC	12	Lucas Mensa	(substituted off) 44'
LW	11	Manuel Montero	(substituted off) 40'
FH	10	Martín Roger
SH	9	Martín Landajo
N8	8	Nicolás Sbrocco	(substituted off) 22'
OF	7	Lautaro Bavaro (c)
BF	6	Jerónimo Ureta
RL	5	Carlos Repetto	(substituted off) 40'
LL	4	Ignacio Calas
TP	3	Martín Fernández Segurotti	(substituted off) 69'
HK	2	Diego Fortuny	(substituted off) 44'
LP	1	Nicolás Solveyra	(substituted off) 44'
Replacements:
HK	16	José Luis González	(substituted on) 44'
PR	17	Rodrigo Martínez	(substituted on) 44'
PR	18	Luciano Ortíz	(substituted on) 69'
LK	19	Lucas Santa Cruz	(substituted on) 40'
FL	20	Santiago Montagner	(substituted on) 22'
SH	21	Manuel Nogués
CE	22	Bautista Ezcurra	(substituted on) 44'
WG	23	Tomás Albornoz	(substituted on) 40'
Coach:
(Argentina) Ignacio Fernández Lobbe

FB	15	German Godlyuk	(substituted off) 71'
RW	14	German Davydov
OC	13	Vladimir Ostroushko
IC	12	Kirill Golosnitskiy
LW	11	Vladislav Sozonov
FH	10	Ramil Gaisin	(substituted off) 69'
SH	9	Vasili Dorofeev	(substituted off) 63'
N8	8	Viktor Gresev (c)
OF	7	Vitali Zhivatov
BF	6	Roman Khodin	(substituted off) 63'
RL	5	Andrei Garbuzov
LL	4	Evgeny Elgin	(substituted off) 59'
TP	3	Kirill Gotovtsev	(substituted off) 56'	(substituted on) 59'	(substituted off) 63'
HK	2	Evgeny Matveev	(substituted off) 56'
LP	1	Evgeny Mishechkin	(substituted off) 56'
Replacements:
HK	16	Sergei Chernyshev	(substituted on) 56'
PR	17	Andrei Polivalov	(substituted on) 56'
PR	18	Innokenty Zykov	(substituted on) 56'	(substituted off) 59'	(substituted on) 63'
LK	19	Alexander Ilin	(substituted on) 59'
FL	20	Tagir Gadzhiev	(substituted on) 63'
SH	21	Dmitri Perov	(substituted on) 63'
FH	22	Sergei Yanyushkin	(substituted on) 69'
FB	23	Vasili Artemiev	(substituted on) 71'
Coach:
(Wales) Lyn Jones

9 June 2019
16:30 UYT (UTC-03)

(2 BP) Uruguay	28–30	Namibia
Try: Vilaseca (2) 37' c, 45' c Ardao 72' c Kessler 78' c Con: Favaro (4/4) 38', 46', 73', 79'; Pen: Favaro (0/1)	Report	Try: Venter (2) 21' c, 26' c Greyling 63' c Con: Loubser (3/3) 22', 27', 64'; Pen: Loubser (3/4) 10', 43', 80'

Estadio Charrúa, Montevideo
Attendance: 2,000
Referee: Ben Whitehouse (WRU)

FB	15	Felipe Etcheverry
RW	14	Federico Favaro
OC	13	Tomás Inciarte
IC	12	Andrés Vilaseca
LW	11	Nicolás Freitas
FH	10	Juan Manuel Cat
SH	9	Santiago Arata	(substituted off) 50'
N8	8	Alejandro Nieto	(substituted off) 20'	(substituted on) 27'
OF	7	Juan Diego Ormaechea	(substituted off) 50'
BF	6	Juan Manuel Gaminara (c)	(substituted off) 67'
RL	5	Manuel Leindekar
LL	4	Diego Magno	(substituted off) 50'
TP	3	Juan Pedro Rombys	(substituted off) 67'
HK	2	Germán Kessler	(yellow card) 16' to 26'
LP	1	Mateo Sanguinetti	(substituted off) 60'
Replacements:
HK	16	Guillermo Pujadas	(substituted on) 20'	(substituted off) 27'
PR	17	Facundo Gattas	(substituted on) 60'
PR	18	Juan Echeverría	(substituted on) 67'
LK	19	Ignacio Dotti	(substituted on) 50'
FL	20	Santiago Civetta	(substituted on) 50'
SH	21	Agustín Ormaechea	(substituted on) 50'
SH	22	Juan Pablo Costabile
FL	23	Manuel Ardao	(substituted on) 67'
Coach:
(Argentina) Esteban Meneses

FB	15	Johann Tromp
RW	14	JC Greyling
OC	13	Johan Deysel (c)
IC	12	Darryl de la Harpe
LW	11	Oderich Mouton	(yellow card) 55' to 65'
FH	10	Cliven Loubser
SH	9	Damian Stevens	(substituted off) 50'
N8	8	Janco Venter	(substituted off) 60'
OF	7	Max Katjijeko
BF	6	Wian Conradie	(substituted off) 60'
RL	5	Tjiuee Uanivi
LL	4	Johan Retief
TP	3	Aranos Coetzee	(substituted off) 73'
HK	2	Obert Nortjé	(substituted off) 79'
LP	1	André Rademeyer	(substituted off) 58'
Replacements:
HK	16	Niel van Vuuren	(substituted on) 79'
PR	17	Desiderius Sethie	(substituted on) 58'
PR	18	AJ De Klerk	(substituted on) 73'
LK	19	Thomasau Forbes	(substituted on) 60'
FL	20	Adriaan Booysen	(substituted on) 60'
SH	21	Eugene Jantjies	(substituted on) 50'
CE	22	Justin Newman
WG	23	Dumarcho Hartung
Coach:
(Wales) Phil Davies

=== Round 3 ===
15 June 2019
15:30 UYT (UTC-03)

Namibia	0–20	Russia
	Report	Try: Gadzhiev; Gresev; Con: Kushnarev (2/2); Pen: Kushnarev (2/2)

Estadio Charrúa, Montevideo
Referee: Francisco González (URU)

FB	15	TC Kisting
RW	14	JC Greyling
OC	13	Justin Newman
IC	12	Johan Deysel (c)
LW	11	Dumarcho Hartung	Temporarily suspended
FH	10	Cliven Loubser
SH	9	Damian Stevens
N8	8	Janco Venter	Temporarily suspended
OF	7	Max Katjijeko
BF	6	Prince !Gaoseb
RL	5	Tjiuee Uanivi
LL	4	Johan Retief
TP	3	Aranos Coetzee
HK	2	Obert Nortjé	Temporarily suspended
LP	1	Desiderius Sethie
Replacements:
HK	16	Niel van Vuuren
PR	17	AJ de Klerk
PR	18	Jason Benade
FL	19	Wian Conradie
FL	20	Adriaan Booysen
SH	21	Eugene Jantjies
WG	22	Darryl de la Harpe
CE	23	PW Steenkamp
Coach:
(Wales) Phil Davies

FB	15	Vasili Artemiev (c)
RW	14	German Davydov
OC	13	Vladimir Ostroushko
IC	12	Dmitri Gerasimov
LW	11	Vladislav Sozonov
FH	10	Yuri Kushnarev
SH	9	Dmitri Perov
N8	8	Viktor Gresev
OF	7	Tagir Gadzhiev
BF	6	Vitali Zhivatov	Temporarily suspended
RL	5	Andrei Garbuzov
LL	4	Alexander Ilin
TP	3	Vladimir Podrezov
HK	2	Sergei Chernyshev
LP	1	Andrei Polivalov
Replacements:
HK	16	Leonid Kalinin
PR	17	Evgeni Mishechkin
PR	18	Innokenty Zykov
LK	19	Evgeni Elgin
FL	20	Eme Patris Peki
SH	21	Ramil Gaisin
SH	22	Sergey Yanyushkin
WG	23	Nikita Churashov
Coach:
(Wales) Lyn Jones

15 June 2019
18:00 UYT (UTC-03)

Uruguay	28–15	Argentina XV
Try: Leindekar 7' c Kessler (2) 40' c, 44' m Con: Favaro (2/3) (8', 40'); Pen: Favaro (3/3) 20', 28', 75'	Report	Try: Portillo 35' c Cruz 60' m Con: Roger (1/2) 36'; Pen: Roger (1/2) 18'

Estadio Charrúa, Montevideo
Attendance: 2000
Referee: Frank Murphy (IRFU)
