= 2019 Rugby Challenge =

3rd edition of the Rugby Challenge

- Countries: South Africa
- Date: 27 April – 22 June 2019
- Champions: Griquas (1st title)
- Runners-up: Pumas
- Matches played: 59
- Tries scored: 557 (average 9.4 per match)
- Top point scorer: George Whitehead, Griquas (95)
- Top try scorer: Jamba Ulengo, Free State XV (10)

The 2019 Rugby Challenge – known as the SuperSport Rugby Challenge for sponsorship reasons – was the 2019 season of the Rugby Challenge, the secondary domestic rugby union competition in South Africa. It was the third edition of the competition organised by the South African Rugby Union and was played between 27 April and 22 June 2019. There were sixteen teams participating in the competition; the fourteen provincial unions, plus Namibian side the Welwitschias and the Zimbabwe Academy. These teams were divided into two sections, with eight teams playing in each of the North Section and the South Section.

== Competition rules and information ==
Each team in the competition played the other teams in their section once during the pool stage, either at home or away. The top two teams in each section will progress to the semifinals, with the two semifinal winners meeting in the final.

== Teams ==
The teams that competed in the 2019 Rugby Challenge are:

Location of teams in the 2019 Rugby Challenge
North Section
South Section

North Section
| Team | Sponsored Name |
|---|---|
| Blue Bulls XV | Vodacom Blue Bulls XV |
| Falcons | Valke |
| Golden Lions XV | Xerox Golden Lions XV |
| Griffons | Griffons |
| Griquas | Tafel Lager Griquas |
| Leopards | Leopards |
| Pumas | Pumas |
| Welwitschias | Windhoek Draught Welwitschias |

South Section
| Team | Sponsored Name |
|---|---|
| Boland Cavaliers | Boland Cavaliers |
| Border Bulldogs | Border Bulldogs |
| Eastern Province Elephants | Multisure Eastern Province Elephants |
| Free State XV | Toyota Free State XV |
| Sharks XV | Cell C Sharks XV |
| SWD Eagles | SWD Eagles |
| Western Province | DHL Western Province |
| Zimbabwe Academy | Zimbabwe Academy |

== North Section ==
=== Log ===
2019 Rugby Challenge North Section log
| Pos | Team | P | W | D | L | PF | PA | PD | TF | TA | TB | LB | Pts |
|---|---|---|---|---|---|---|---|---|---|---|---|---|---|
| 1 | Pumas | 7 | 7 | 0 | 0 | 337 | 164 | +173 | 50 | 22 | 7 | 0 | 35 |
| 2 | Griquas | 7 | 6 | 0 | 1 | 290 | 156 | +134 | 41 | 19 | 7 | 0 | 31 |
| 3 | Blue Bulls XV | 7 | 5 | 0 | 2 | 332 | 190 | +142 | 47 | 27 | 5 | 0 | 25 |
| 4 | Golden Lions XV | 7 | 4 | 0 | 3 | 263 | 263 | 0 | 40 | 37 | 7 | 0 | 23 |
| 5 | Falcons | 7 | 3 | 0 | 4 | 240 | 261 | −21 | 38 | 41 | 5 | 2 | 19 |
| 6 | Leopards | 7 | 1 | 0 | 6 | 267 | 283 | −16 | 39 | 40 | 6 | 2 | 12 |
| 7 | Griffons | 7 | 2 | 0 | 5 | 193 | 252 | −59 | 26 | 37 | 4 | 0 | 12 |
| 8 | Welwitschias | 7 | 0 | 0 | 7 | 112 | 465 | −353 | 14 | 72 | 0 | 0 | 0 |

- The Pumas and Griquas qualified for the semifinals.

=== Round-by-round ===
The table below shows each team's progression throughout the season. For each round, each team's cumulative points total is shown with the overall log position in brackets.

Team Progression – North Section
| Team | R1 | R2 | R3 | R4 | R5 | R6 | R7 | SF | F |
|---|---|---|---|---|---|---|---|---|---|
| Pumas | 5 (3rd) | 10 (3rd) | 15 (3rd) | 20 (2nd) | 25 (1st) | 30 (1st) | 35 (1st) | Won | Lost |
| Griquas | 5 (1st) | 10 (1st) | 15 (1st) | 20 (1st) | 21 (2nd) | 26 (2nd) | 31 (2nd) | Won | Won |
| Blue Bulls XV | 0 (6th) | 5 (4th) | 10 (4th) | 10 (4th) | 15 (4th) | 20 (4th) | 25 (3rd) | — | — |
| Golden Lions XV | 5 (2nd) | 10 (2nd) | 15 (2nd) | 16 (3rd) | 17 (3rd) | 22 (3rd) | 23 (4th) | — | — |
| Falcons | 0 (8th) | 1 (7th) | 3 (7th) | 8 (6th) | 13 (5th) | 14 (5th) | 19 (5th) | — | — |
| Leopards | 2 (5th) | 3 (6th) | 4 (6th) | 6 (7th) | 11 (6th) | 11 (6th) | 12 (6th) | — | — |
| Griffons | 5 (4th) | 5 (5th) | 5 (5th) | 10 (5th) | 11 (7th) | 11 (7th) | 12 (7th) | — | — |
| Welwitschias | 0 (7th) | 0 (8th) | 0 (8th) | 0 (8th) | 0 (8th) | 0 (8th) | 0 (8th) | — | — |
| Key: | win | draw | loss | bye | | | | | |

=== Matches ===
==== Round One ====
| 26 April 2019 | Pumas | 29–21 | Blue Bulls XV | Mbombela Stadium, Mbombela |
| 19:00 | Try: Devon Williams 15'; Willie Engelbrecht 42'; Francois Kleinhans 48'; Alwayno Visagie 62'; Con: Chris Smith 16', 49', 63'; Pen: Chris Smith 55' | Scoreboard | Try: JT Jackson 72'; Cornal Hendricks 77'; Con: JT Jackson 73'; Pen: JT Jackson 25', 34', 40' | Referee: Divan Uys |

| 27 April 2019 | Griquas | 52–10 | Falcons | Tafel Lager Park, Kimberley |
| 14:30 | Try: Ederies Arendse 4', 40'; Grant Hermanus 12'; Wendal Wehr 27', 52'; Sias Koen 58'; Conway Pretorius 69'; Enver Brandt 77'; Con: George Whitehead 5', 13', 28', 40', 58'; Tinus de Beer 70' | Scoreboard | Try: Friedle Olivier 22'; Coert Cronjé 42' | Referee: Stephan Geldenhuys |

| 27 April 2019 | Griffons | 34–27 | Leopards | HT Pelatona Projects Stadium, Welkom |
| 16:00 | Try: Domenic Smit 35'; Ezrick Alexander 40', 52'; Duncan van Vuuren 59'; Jean Pretorius 63'; Con: Jaywinn Juries 36', 40', 53'; Pen: Neil Stannard 68' | Scoreboard | Try: Reuben du Plooy 12', 55'; Keagan Tait 31'; Edmund Rheeder 72'; Con: Siya Masuku 32', 56'; Pen: Siya Masuku 45' | Referee: Christopher Allison |

| 27 April 2019 | Welwitschias | 23–40 | Golden Lions XV | Hage Geingob Stadium, Windhoek |
| 16:00 | Try: Adriaan Booysen 75'; JC Winckler 79'; Con: PW Steenkamp 76', 80'; Pen: PW Steenkamp 8', 38'; Drop: Cliven Loubser 57' | Scoreboard | Try: Yanga Hlalu 12', 31'; Chergin Fillies 43'; PJ Botha 52'; Ruben Schoeman 62'; Stean Pienaar 67'; Con: Jeanluc Cilliers 12', 32', 53', 63', 68' | Referee: Vusi Msibi |

==== Round Two ====
| 4 May 2019 | Blue Bulls XV | 87–21 | Welwitschias | Loftus Versfeld, Pretoria |
| 12:45 | Try: Ruan Steenkamp 3'; Embrose Papier 14'; Travis Ismaiel 20'; Erich Cronjé 23', 37', 39'; Duncan Matthews 31', 55'; Earll Douwrie 44'; Theo Boshoff 48'; Nick de Jager 57'; Vaughen Isaacs 67'; Madot Mabokela 74'; Con: JT Jackson 5', 15', 21', 25', 32', 38', 40', 45', 56'; Vaughen Isaacs 68', 74' | Scoreboard | Try: Leneve Damens 52'; Oderich Mouton 63'; Adriaan Booysen 78'; Con: Cliven Loubser 52'; PW Steenkamp 64', 78' | Referee: Griffin Colby |

| 4 May 2019 | Falcons | 19–26 | Pumas | Bosman Stadium, Brakpan |
| 15:00 | Try: Coert Cronjé 22'; Anrich Richter 38'; Marco Klopper 67'; Con: Anrich Richter 23', 39' | Scoreboard | Try: Devon Williams 6', 35'; Jeandré Rudolph 12'; Marco Palvie 70'; Con: Chris Smith 7', 36'; Kobus Marais 71' | Referee: Stuart Berry |

| 4 May 2019 | Leopards | 27–55 | Golden Lions XV | Hoërskool Wolmaransstad, Wolmaransstad |
| 15:30 | Try: Marius Stander 11'; Johan Retief 48'; Eugene Hare 59'; Chriswill September 74'; Con: Lincoln Daniels 50', 75'; Pen: Lincoln Daniels 8' | Scoreboard | Try: Jo-Hanko de Villiers 16', 41', 77'; Madosh Tambwe 20', 38', 64'; PJ Botha 29'; Ulrich Maritz 52'; Con: Jeanluc Cilliers 17', 21', 30', 39', 65', 78'; Pen: Jeanluc Cilliers 70' | Referee: Archie Sehlako |

| 4 May 2019 | Griffons | 26–35 | Griquas | HT Pelatona Projects Stadium, Welkom |
| 16:00 | Try: Jaywinn Juries 49'; Neil Stannard 52'; Con: Jaywinn Juries 51', 53'; Pen: Jaywinn Juries 3', 19', 23', 28' | Scoreboard | Try: Wendal Wehr 5'; André Swarts 24'; Anthony Volmink 30'; AJ le Roux 39'; Khwezi Mkhafu 66'; Con: George Whitehead 7', 30'; Pen: George Whitehead 57', 76' | Referee: Ruhan Meiring |

==== Round Three ====
| 10 May 2019 | Blue Bulls XV | 35–20 | Griffons | Loftus Versfeld, Pretoria |
| 16:50 | Try: Duncan Matthews 20'; Theo Boshoff 31'; Ruan Steenkamp 45', 49'; Diego Appollis 78'; Con: JT Jackson 22', 31', 46', 50', 79' | Scoreboard | Try: Jean Pretorius 18'; Arthur Williams 74'; Con: Jaywinn Juries 19'; Ethan Williams 74'; Pen: Jaywinn Juries 15', 25' | Referee: Paul Mente |

| 10 May 2019 | Pumas | 40–30 | Leopards | Mbombela Stadium, Mbombela |
| 19:00 | Try: HP van Schoor 7', 29'; Devon Williams 9'; Francois Kleinhans 13'; Stefan Willemse 58'; JP Lewis 71'; Con: Chris Smith 8', 10', 14', 59', 72' | Scoreboard | Try: Jimmy Mpailane 25'; Edmund Rheeder 46'; Keagan Tait 77'; Chuiner van Rooyen 80'; Con: Schalk Hugo 27', 47'; Pen: Schalk Hugo 50'; Drop: Schalk Hugo 18' | Referee: Stephan Geldenhuys |

| 11 May 2019 | Golden Lions XV | 43–40 | Falcons | Emirates Airline Park, Johannesburg |
| 12:00 | Try: Stean Pienaar 4', 25'; Madosh Tambwe 8'; Jo-Hanko de Villiers 11', 64'; Ruben Schoeman 31'; James Venter 41'; Con: Jeanluc Cilliers 12', 26', 32', 43' | Scoreboard | Try: Marco Klopper 16'; Errol Jaggers 35'; Anrich Richter 50', 72'; Hardus Pretorius 59'; Friedle Olivier 66'; Con: Anrich Richter 17', 35', 51', 60', 68' | Referee: Cwengile Jadezweni |

| 11 May 2019 | Welwitschias | 24–61 | Griquas | Hage Geingob Stadium, Windhoek |
| 16:00 | Try: Darryl de la Harpe 22'; Thomasau Forbes 57'; Chrysander Botha 67'; Con: Cliven Loubser 23', 58', 68'; Pen: Cliven Loubser 31' | Scoreboard | Try: Cody Basson 8'; Godfrey Ramaboea 27' penalty try 34'; Wilmar Arnoldi 49'; Anthony Volmink 53'; George Whitehead 62'; Michal Haznar 69'; Sias Koen 72'; Gideon van der Merwe 74'; Con: Tinus de Beer 29', 50', 54'; George Whitehead 63', 70', 73', 75' | Referee: Jaco Pretorius |

==== Round Four ====
| 18 May 2019 | Golden Lions XV | 33–51 | Pumas | Emirates Airline Park, Johannesburg |
| 12:00 | Try: Jan-Louis la Grange 34'; Prince Nkabinde 45'; Sylvian Mahuza 49'; Ruben Schoeman 59'; Pieter Jansen 80'; Con: Sylvian Mahuza 35', 47'; Ruan Combrinck 60'; Dillon Smit 80' | Scoreboard | Try: penalty try 29'; Alwayno Visagie 36', 56'; Chris Smith 40'; Neil Maritz 42', 54'; Phumzile Maqondwana 76'; Con: Chris Smith 37', 40', 43', 77'; Pen: Chris Smith 7', 12' | Referee: Quinton Immelman |

| 18 May 2019 | Griquas | 38–17 | Blue Bulls XV | Tafel Lager Park, Kimberley |
| 14:30 | Try: Ederies Arendse 8', 65'; AJ le Roux 20'; André Swarts 26'; Sias Koen 56'; Con: George Whitehead 10', 21', 27', 57', 66'; Pen: George Whitehead 63' | Scoreboard | Try: Travis Ismaiel 15'; JT Jackson 48'; Con: Theo Boshoff 17', 50'; Pen: JT Jackson 53' | Referee: Egon Seconds |

| 19 May 2019 | Griffons | 34–24 | Welwitschias | Rustenburg Impala Rugby Club, Rustenburg |
| 12:30 | Try: Ezrick Alexander 6'; Domenic Smit 11'; Jean Pretorius 15'; Neil Stannard 54'; Duan Pretorius 61'; Con: Jaywinn Juries 12', 17', 55'; Pen: Danrich Visagie 80' | Scoreboard | Try: Johann Tromp 2'; AJ de Klerk 25'; Louis van der Westhuizen 48'; Con: Cliven Loubser 2', 27', 50'; Pen: Cliven Loubser 39' | Referee: Ben Crouse |

| 19 May 2019 | Leopards | 50–52 | Falcons | Rustenburg Impala Rugby Club, Rustenburg |
| 14:30 | Try: Eugene Hare 10', 73', 75'; Edmund Rheeder 24', 32', 38'; Schalk Hugo 44'; Andries Fouché 70'; Con: Schalk Hugo 25', 40', 71', 74', 76' | Scoreboard | Try: Rodney Damons 8', 35'; Coert Cronjé 20'; Friedle Olivier 51'; Andrew van Wyk 57', 67'; Errol Jaggers 65'; Con: Anrich Richter 9', 21', 36', 52'; André du Plessis 58', 66', 68'; Pen: Anrich Richter 29' | Referee: Paul Mente |

==== Round Five ====
| 25 May 2019 | Pumas | 37–28 | Griquas | Nelspruit Rugby Club, Mbombela |
| 15:00 | Try: Reynier van Rooyen 14'; Jeandré Rudolph 17'; Morné Joubert 28', 76'; Corniel Els 55'; Con: Chris Smith 15', 18', 29'; Pen: Chris Smith 9', 25' | Scoreboard | Try: Anthony Volmink 6'; Ederies Arendse 22'; Enver Brandt 62'; Conway Pretorius 67'; Con: George Whitehead 7', 23', 63', 68' | Referee: Ben Crouse |

| 25 May 2019 | Welwitschias | 8–81 | Leopards | Hage Geingob Stadium, Windhoek |
| 16:00 | Try: Uazikamisa Mieze 48'; Pen: Henrique Olivier 33' | Scoreboard | Try: Muziwandile Mazibuko 3'; Evardi Boshoff 6', 37'; Eugene Hare 10', 35', 42'; Morné Moos 20'; Lungelo Gosa 25'; Gustav du Rand 30'; Andries Fouché 59'; Bradley Moolman 63'; Keagan Tait 68'; Boetie Groenewald 76'; Con: Schalk Hugo 11', 20', 26', 31', 39', 59', 64', 69' | Referee: Ruhan Meiring |

| 26 May 2019 | Blue Bulls XV | 62–24 | Golden Lions XV | Bosman Stadium, Brakpan |
| 12:30 | Try: Lian du Toit 12'; Diego Appollis 22', 29'; Matthys Basson 33'; Travis Ismaiel 38', 43'; Jade Stighling 40', 78'; Duncan Matthews 72'; Con: Marnitz Boshoff 13', 30', 39', 40', 44'; Theo Boshoff 73', 79'; Pen: Marnitz Boshoff 26' | Scoreboard | Try: Kennedy Mpeku 1'; Ruan Vermaak 7'; Prince Nkabinde 50'; James Venter 57'; Con: Sylvian Mahuza 8'; Ruan Combrinck 58' | Referee: Quinton Immelman |

| 26 May 2019 | Falcons | 41–31 | Griffons | Bosman Stadium, Brakpan |
| 14:30 | Try: Rodney Damons 1', 22'; Boela Venter 8'; Andries Truter 24', 32'; Martin Sithole 60'; Con: André du Plessis 23', 24', 33', 61'; Pen: André du Plessis 55' | Scoreboard | Try: Ezrick Alexander 16', 51', 77'; Duan Pretorius 43'; Duncan van Vuuren 63'; Con: Jaywinn Juries 17'; Duan Pretorius 44'; Danrich Visagie 77' | Referee: Cwengile Jadezweni |

==== Round Six ====
| 1 June 2019 | Golden Lions XV | 42–15 | Griffons | Emirates Airline Park, Johannesburg |
| 14:00 | Try: Pieter Jansen 1', 39'; Nathan McBeth 11'; James Venter 45'; Tyreeq February 54'; Jan-Louis la Grange 79'; Con: Ruan Combrinck 1', 12', 40', 46', 55', 80' | Scoreboard | Try: Nkosi Nofuma 62'; Domenic Smit 71'; Allistair Mumba 76' | Referee: Jaco Pretorius |

| 1 June 2019 | Falcons | 22–47 | Blue Bulls XV | Bosman Stadium, Brakpan |
| 15:00 | Try: Juandré Nel 30'; Thabo Mabuza 38', 79'; Shane Kirkwood 63'; Con: André du Plessis 31' | Scoreboard | Try: Wian van Niekerk 20', 34'; Muller Uys 27'; Roelof Smit 45'; Duncan Matthews 49', 57'; Llewellyn Classen 75'; Con: Marnitz Boshoff 22', 28', 34', 46', 58'; Theo Boshoff 77' | Referee: Ben Crouse |

| 1 June 2019 | Pumas | 106–0 | Welwitschias | Mbombela Stadium, Mbombela |
| 15:00 | Try: Boeta Vermaak 2'; JP Lewis 4', 41'; Kobus Marais 13'; Henko Marais 18', 71'; Marco Palvie 24', 48', 57'; Piet-Louw Strauss 30'; Etienne Taljaard 38'; Phumzile Maqondwana 43'; Hilton Lobberts 60', 79'; Giovanne Snyman 63'; Carel du Preez 75'; Con: Kobus Marais 2', 5', 14', 19', 25', 31', 39', 43', 58', 61', 64'; Ashlon Davids 76', 80' | Scoreboard | | Referee: Archie Sehlako |

| 1 June 2019 | Leopards | 16–31 | Griquas | Leeudoringstad Rugby Club, Leeudoringstad |
| 15:45 | Try: Tjaart Benade 8'; Con: Schalk Hugo 9'; Pen: Schalk Hugo 18', 28', 33' | Scoreboard | Try: Chris Smit 13', 46'; Conway Pretorius 30'; Ederies Arendse 56'; Con: Tinus de Beer 14', 31', 47', 57'; Pen: Tinus de Beer 69' | Referee: Jaco Kotze |

==== Round Seven ====
| 7 June 2019 | Blue Bulls XV | 63–36 | Leopards | Loftus Versfeld, Pretoria |
| 14:00 | Try: Matthys Basson; Werner Fourie; Roelof Smit; Muller Uys; Lian du Toit; Jade Stighling; Andrew Kota (2); Theo Maree; Con: Marnitz Boshoff (7); Theo Boshoff (2) | Scoreboard (Note: The times of the scores are unknown.) | Try: Edmund Rheeder (2); Bradley Moolman; Chuiner van Rooyen (2); Con: Schalk Hugo (3); Chuiner van Rooyen; Pen: Schalk Hugo | Referee: Ruhan Meiring |

| 8 June 2019 | Griquas | 45–26 | Golden Lions XV | Tafel Lager Park, Kimberley |
| 14:30 | Try: Anthony Volmink 7', 54', 75'; Gideon van der Merwe 14'; Khwezi Mona 28', 80'; Con: George Whitehead 8', 15', 30', 55', 76', 80'; Pen: George Whitehead 39' | Scoreboard | Try: Mandisi Mthiyane 10'; Dillon Smit 24'; James Venter 47'; Kennedy Mpeku 79'; Con: Eddie Fouché 11', 26', 47' | Referee: Paul Mente |

| 8 June 2019 | Griffons | 33–48 | Pumas | HT Pelatona Projects Stadium, Welkom |
| 15:00 | Try: Jaywinn Juries 8'; Vincent Maruping 32'; Nkosi Nofuma 44'; Allistair Mumba 46'; Con: Jaywinn Juries 9', 33'; Pen: Jaywinn Juries 6', 69'; Danrich Visagie 40' | Scoreboard (Note: SuperSport incorrectly credits one of Jeandré Rudolph's three tries to Marko Janse van Rensburg. It's unknown whether this is the 55th-minute try or the 76-minute try, the former has been assumed.) | Try: Ruwellyn Isbell 3', 51'; Corniel Els 23'; Stefan Willemse 28'; Jeandré Rudolph 37', 55', 72'; Marko Janse van Rensburg 76'; Con: Kobus Marais 24', 38'; Ashlon Davids 55', 77' | Referee: Ben Crouse |

| 8 June 2019 | Welwitschias | 12–56 | Falcons | Hage Geingob Stadium, Windhoek |
| 16:00 | Try: Gerhard Thirion; Milaan van Wyk; Con: Lorenzo Louis | Scoreboard | Try: Thabo Mabuza (3); Boela Venter; Rodney Damons (3); Coert Cronjé; Juandré Nel (2); Con: Andries Truter; Anrich Richter (2) | Referee: Quinton Immelman |

== South Section ==
=== Log ===
2019 Rugby Challenge South Section log
| Pos | Team | P | W | D | L | PF | PA | PD | TF | TA | TB | LB | Pts |
|---|---|---|---|---|---|---|---|---|---|---|---|---|---|
| 1 | Western Province | 7 | 6 | 0 | 1 | 275 | 132 | +143 | 36 | 16 | 5 | 1 | 30 |
| 2 | Boland Cavaliers | 7 | 6 | 0 | 1 | 252 | 110 | +142 | 35 | 14 | 4 | 1 | 29 |
| 3 | Free State XV | 7 | 5 | 0 | 2 | 342 | 135 | +207 | 52 | 17 | 6 | 1 | 27 |
| 4 | Sharks XV | 7 | 4 | 0 | 3 | 245 | 197 | +48 | 35 | 26 | 5 | 0 | 21 |
| 5 | Eastern Province Elephants | 7 | 4 | 0 | 3 | 212 | 166 | +46 | 30 | 22 | 3 | 0 | 19 |
| 6 | SWD Eagles | 7 | 2 | 0 | 5 | 149 | 315 | −166 | 21 | 46 | 3 | 0 | 11 |
| 7 | Border Bulldogs | 7 | 1 | 0 | 6 | 116 | 348 | −232 | 15 | 49 | 1 | 1 | 6 |
| 8 | Zimbabwe Academy | 7 | 0 | 0 | 7 | 114 | 302 | −188 | 13 | 47 | 1 | 1 | 2 |

- The Boland Cavaliers and Western Province qualified for the semifinals.

=== Round-by-round ===
The table below shows each team's progression throughout the season. For each round, each team's cumulative points total is shown with the overall log position in brackets.

Team Progression – South Section
| Team | R1 | R2 | R3 | R4 | R5 | R6 | R7 | SF | F |
|---|---|---|---|---|---|---|---|---|---|
| Western Province | 5 (1st) | 10 (1st) | 15 (1st) | 20 (1st) | 24 (1st) | 29 (1st) | 30 (1st) | Lost | — |
| Boland Cavaliers | 5 (2nd) | 9 (2nd) | 14 (2nd) | 15 (2nd) | 20 (3rd) | 25 (2nd) | 29 (2nd) | Lost | — |
| Free State XV | 5 (4th) | 5 (6th) | 10 (3rd) | 15 (3rd) | 20 (2nd) | 22 (3rd) | 27 (3rd) | — | — |
| Sharks XV | 1 (5th) | 6 (3rd) | 6 (4th) | 11 (4th) | 16 (4th) | 16 (4th) | 21 (4th) | — | — |
| Eastern Province Elephants | 0 (7th) | 5 (5th) | 5 (6th) | 10 (5th) | 10 (5th) | 14 (5th) | 19 (5th) | — | — |
| SWD Eagles | 0 (8th) | 1 (7th) | 6 (5th) | 6 (6th) | 7 (6th) | 11 (6th) | 11 (6th) | — | — |
| Border Bulldogs | 5 (3rd) | 5 (4th) | 5 (7th) | 5 (7th) | 5 (7th) | 6 (7th) | 6 (7th) | — | — |
| Zimbabwe Academy | 0 (6th) | 0 (8th) | 2 (8th) | 2 (8th) | 2 (8th) | 2 (8th) | 2 (8th) | — | — |
| Key: | win | draw | loss | bye | | | | | |

=== Matches ===
==== Round One ====
| 27 April 2019 | Boland Cavaliers | 34–6 | Eastern Province Elephants | Boland Stadium, Wellington |
| 15:30 | Try: Ricardo Duarttee 11'; Wikus Groenewald 31'; Pat O'Brien 67'; Andries Viljoen 69'; Con: Garrick Mattheus 12', 32'; Joshua Vermeulen 68', 70'; Pen: Garrick Mattheus 20', 46' | Scoreboard | Pen: Richman Gora 24', 28' | Referee: Archie Sehlako |

| 27 April 2019 | Free State XV | 40–31 | Sharks XV | Toyota Stadium, Bloemfontein |
| 15:00 | Try: Jamba Ulengo 25', 32', 65'; Janus Venter 45'; Carel-Jan Coetzee 56'; Dian Badenhorst 76'; Con: Ernst Stapelberg 26', 33', 46', 66'; Tapiwa Mafura 77' | Scoreboard | Try: penalty try 8'; Leolin Zas 9', 15'; Rhyno Smith 20'; Con: Rhyno Smith 11', 15', 20'; Drop: Rhyno Smith 63' | Referee: Paul Mente |

| 28 April 2019 | SWD Eagles | 7–62 | Western Province | Buffalo City Stadium, East London |
| 12:30 | Try: Marquit September 28'; Con: Gerhard Nortier 30' | Scoreboard | Try: Edwill van der Merwe 17', 54'; Nico Leonard 25'; Dan Jooste 38'; Abner van Reenen 51'; Sihle Njezula 61'; EW Viljoen 71'; Johan du Toit 73'; Craig Barry 80'; Con: Abner van Reenen 19', 26', 40', 52', 54'; Lyle Hendricks 61', 80'; Pen: Abner van Reenen 11' | Referee: Griffin Colby |

| 28 April 2019 | Border Bulldogs | 41–16 | Zimbabwe Academy | Buffalo City Stadium, East London |
| 14:30 | Try: Sipho Nofemele 1', 49'; Bangi Kobese 10'; Lubabalo Lento 33'; Onke Dubase 64'; Aphiwe Stemele 76'; Con: Aphiwe Stemele 2', 11', 50', 77'; Pen: Aphiwe Stemele 42' | Scoreboard | Try: Brian Nyaude 31'; Con: Brendon Mandivenga 32'; Pen: Brendon Mandivenga 5', 9', 40' | Referee: Ruhan Meiring |

==== Round Two ====
| 4 May 2019 | Boland Cavaliers | 21–10 | Free State XV | Paternoster Sports Ground, Paternoster |
| 14:00 | Try: Adriaan Ludick 9'; Tapiwa Tsomondo 17'; Michaine Fick 38'; Con: Garrick Mattheus 10', 18', 39' | Scoreboard | Try: Boan Venter 64'; Jamba Ulengo 69' | Referee: Egon Seconds |

| 4 May 2019 | Eastern Province Elephants | 59–31 | SWD Eagles | Wolfson Stadium, KwaZakele |
| 15:30 | Try: Michael Botha 8'; Stephan de Wit 14'; Richman Gora 23', 31'; Rynardt van Wyk 40'; Mihlali Mpafi 45'; Oliver Zono 48'; Diego Williams 59'; Meli Rokoua 69'; Con: Oliver Zono 9', 24', 31', 40', 60', 69'; Ntabeni Dukisa 49' | Scoreboard | Try: Ganfried May 35'; Dillin Snel 42'; Vuyo Mbotho 51'; Marquit September 71', 75'; Con: Gerhard Nortier 37'; Divan Nel 72', 75' | Referee: Divan Uys |

| 4 May 2019 | Border Bulldogs | 24–48 | Western Province | Kempston Park, East London |
| 16:00 | Try: Billy Dutton 31'; Foxy Ntleki 47' penalty try 63'; Con: Aphiwe Stemele 32', 48'; Pen: Aphiwe Stemele 58' | Scoreboard | Try: Nico Leonard 18'; Chad Solomon 45', 53'; Marno Redelinghuys 49'; Cornel Smit 65'; Craig Barry 77'; Con: Abner van Reenen 20', 47', 49', 54', 66', 78'; Pen: Abner van Reenen 10', 27' | Referee: Ben Crouse |

| 4 May 2019 | Zimbabwe Academy | 14–36 | Sharks XV | Phil Herbstein Field, Constantia |
| 16:00 | Try: Biselele Tshamala 50', 71'; Con: Jeremiah Jaravaza 50'; Hilton Mudariki 72' | Scoreboard | Try: Adam Mountfort 1'; Murray Koster 10', 44'; Lunga Ncube 18'; Connor Botha 56'; Kwanda Dimaza 62'; Con: Rhyno Smith 2', 11', 57' | Referee: Jaco Pretorius |

==== Round Three ====
| 10 May 2019 | Sharks XV | 20–47 | Western Province | KP2, Kings Park, Durban |
| 16:00 | Try: Kwanda Dimaza 5'; Wian Vosloo 47'; Con: Rhyno Smith 6', 47'; Pen: Rhyno Smith 1', 10' | Scoreboard | Try: penalty try 20', 28'; Edwill van der Merwe 32', 41'; Paul de Wet 62'; Marno Redelinghuys 70'; Craig Barry 75'; Con: Abner van Reenen 33', 42', 63', 72' | Referee: Stuart Berry |

| 11 May 2019 | Border Bulldogs | 0–52 | Boland Cavaliers | Police Park, East London |
| 15:30 | | Scoreboard | Try: Valentino Wellman 15', 51'; Tapiwa Tsomondo 18', 41', 60'; Pat O'Brien 47'; Shilton van Wyk 56', 79'; Con: Garrick Mattheus 16', 19', 48'; Joshua Vermeulen 52'; Monty Dumond 57', 80' | Referee: Griffin Colby |

| 12 May 2019 | Eastern Province Elephants | 12–49 | Free State XV | D'Almeida Stadium, Mossel Bay |
| 12:00 | Try: Michael Botha 8'; Michael Makase 26'; Con: Oliver Zono 8' | Scoreboard | Try: Jamba Ulengo 16'; Ernst Stapelberg 22', 66'; Tapiwa Mafura 39'; Jasper Wiese 44'; Marlou van Niekerk 48'; Marnus van der Merwe 80'; Con: Ernst Stapelberg 17', 23', 40', 45', 49', 68', 80' | Referee: Ruhan Meiring |

| 12 May 2019 | SWD Eagles | 31–30 | Zimbabwe Academy | D'Almeida Stadium, Mossel Bay |
| 14:00 | Try: Dillin Snel 1'; Shario Rosenkrantz 9'; Marquit September 26', 65'; Lwando Mabenge 77'; Con: Gerhard Nortier 2', 27'; Leighton Eksteen 66' | Scoreboard | Try: Kudzai Mashawi 14'; Aiden Burnett 62'; George Saungweme 74'; Cleopas Kundiona 80'; Con: Jeremiah Jaravaza 14'; Hilton Mudariki 80'; Pen: Jeremiah Jaravaza 42', 47' | Referee: Vusi Msibi |

==== Round Four ====
| 17 May 2019 | Sharks XV | 29–28 | Boland Cavaliers | KP2, Kings Park, Durban |
| 15:00 | Try: penalty try 13'; Sicelo Tole 20'; Lwazi Mvovo 32'; Rhyno Smith 67'; Con: Rhyno Smith 33', 68'; Pen: Rhyno Smith 80' | Scoreboard | Try: Valentino Wellman 10'; Shilton van Wyk 36'; Shirwin Cupido 62'; Con: Garrick Mattheus 37', 64'; Pen: Garrick Mattheus 23', 42', 66' | Referee: Stephan Geldenhuys |

| 18 May 2019 | Western Province | 33–13 | Zimbabwe Academy | DHL Newlands, Cape Town |
| 14:30 | Try: Chad Solomon 3'; Godlen Masimla 24', 48'; Johan du Toit 38'; Edwill van der Merwe 62'; Con: Abner van Reenen 4', 25', 49', 63' | Scoreboard | Try: Kuda Chiwanza 67'; Con: Brendon Mandivenga 68'; Pen: Brendon Mandivenga 20', 59' | Referee: Vusi Msibi |

| 18 May 2019 | Free State XV | 64–17 | SWD Eagles | Clive Solomon Stadium, Heidedal |
| 14:30 | Try: Adriaan Carelse 1'; Jasper Wiese 3', 13', 79'; Boan Venter 26'; Darren Adonis 29'; Jamba Ulengo 32'; Keanan Murray 34'; Niell Jordaan 45'; Carel-Jan Coetzee 67'; Con: Ernst Stapelberg 4', 14', 30', 33', 34', 46'; Lubabalo Dobela 67' | Scoreboard | Try: Leighton Eksteen 10'; Shario Rosenkrantz 18'; Con: Divan Nel 11', 19'; Pen: Divan Nel 16' | Referee: Divan Uys |

| 19 May 2019 | Eastern Province Elephants | 52–3 | Border Bulldogs | Wolfson Stadium, KwaZakele |
| 15:00 | Try: Athi Mayinje 2'; Michael Botha 5', 32'; Zingisa April 15', 43'; Rynardt van Wyk 17'; Ntabeni Dukisa 46'; Diego Williams 77'; Con: Ntabeni Dukisa 16', 19', 34', 44', 47', 78' | Scoreboard | Pen: Aphiwe Stemele 24' | Referee: Archie Sehlako |

==== Round Five ====
| 25 May 2019 | Western Province | 27–13 | Eastern Province Elephants | DHL Newlands, Cape Town |
| 12:15 | Try: David Brits 40'; Kwenzo Blose 55'; Chris Massyn 79'; Con: Abner van Reenen 40', 57', 80'; Pen: Abner van Reenen 29', 63' | Scoreboard | Try: Riaan Arends 34'; Con: Ntabeni Dukisa 35'; Pen: Ntabeni Dukisa 18', 26' | Referee: Jaco Kotze |

| 25 May 2019 | Sharks XV | 82–24 | Border Bulldogs | Jonsson Kings Park, Durban |
| 14:30 | Try: Cullen Collopy 1'; Boeta Chamberlain 3', 72'; Zee Mkhabela 10'; Khutha Mchunu 13'; Sicelo Tole 20'; Jeremy Ward 27'; Charlie Mayeza 30', 36', 41' penalty try 71'; Murray Koster 79'; Con: Inny Radebe 2', 4', 11', 15', 28', 31', 36', 42'; Boeta Chamberlain 73', 80' | Scoreboard | Try: Sipho Nofemele 40'; Aphiwe Stemele 49'; Sonwabiso Mqalo 58'; Con: Aphiwe Stemele 40', 50', 59'; Pen: Dilolo Mapuko 8' | Referee: Stuart Berry |

| 25 May 2019 | SWD Eagles | 28–43 | Boland Cavaliers | Rosemore Stadium, George |
| 14:30 | Try: Marquit September 17', 79'; Dillin Snel 27', 64'; Con: Gerhard Nortier 18', 29'; Leighton Eksteen 66', 79' | Scoreboard | Try: Shilton van Wyk 6'; Kenan Cronjé 13', 24'; Francois Esterhuyzen 38'; Valentino Wellman 61', 74'; Con: Garrick Mattheus 7', 15', 25', 62', 76'; Pen: Garrick Mattheus 71' | Referee: Aimee Barrett-Theron |

| 25 May 2019 | Zimbabwe Academy | 10–66 | Free State XV | Phil Herbstein Field, Constantia |
| 16:00 | Try: Aiden Burnett 58'; Con: Brendon Mandivenga 59'; Pen: Brendon Mandivenga 1' | Scoreboard | Try: Janus Venter 3'; Tapiwa Mafura 18', 39'; Lubabalo Dobela 26', 34'; Jamba Ulengo 41', 60'; Jacques du Toit 69'; Darren Adonis 76'; Daniel Maartens 80'; Con: Ernst Stapelberg 4', 27', 70'; Lubabalo Dobela 35', 40', 42'; Adriaan Carelse 62', 76' | Referee: Rasta Rasivhenge |

==== Round Six ====
| 31 May 2019 | SWD Eagles | 18–17 | Border Bulldogs | Outeniqua Park, George |
| 19:00 | Try: Wayne Wilschut 44'; Anton Smit 65'; Con: Gerhard Nortier 66'; Pen: Divan Nel 12'; Gerhard Nortier 72' | Scoreboard | Try: Onke Dubase 33'; Sipho Nofemele 48'; Con: Aphiwe Stemele 34', 50'; Pen: Aphiwe Stemele 40' | Referee: Vusi Msibi |

| 1 June 2019 | Boland Cavaliers | 52–16 | Zimbabwe Academy | Boland Stadium, Wellington |
| 15:30 | Try: Michaine Fick 7', 61'; Shilton van Wyk 12'; Thurlow Marsh 27'; Jordan Holgate 32', 52'; Tapiwa Tsomondo 57'; Valentino Wellman 79'; Con: Garrick Mattheus 8', 13', 33', 53'; Gavern Skippers 63'; Monty Dumond 80' | Scoreboard | Try: Royal Mwale 47'; Brendon Mandivenga 73'; Pen: Brendon Mandivenga 1', 17' | Referee: Quinton Immelman |

| 2 June 2019 | Free State XV | 33–37 | Western Province | Wolfson Stadium, KwaZakele |
| 12:30 | Try: Jasper Wiese 3'; Darren Adonis 6', 62'; Günther Janse van Vuuren 34'; Carel-Jan Coetzee 58'; Con: Lubabalo Dobela 4', 36', 59', 63' | Scoreboard | Try: EW Viljoen 20'; Brandon Valentyn 49' penalty try 68'; Tristan Leyds 72'; Con: Abner van Reenen 21', 50', 73'; Pen: Abner van Reenen 13', 75', 80' | Referee: Stuart Berry |

| 2 June 2019 | Eastern Province Elephants | 27–7 | Sharks XV | Wolfson Stadium, KwaZakele |
| 14:30 | Try: Tristan Fourie 45'; Mihlali Mpafi 54'; Martin du Toit 62'; Con: Ntabeni Dukisa 46', 56', 63'; Pen: Ntabeni Dukisa 6', 28' | Scoreboard | Try: Lwazi Mvovo 79'; Con: Boeta Chamberlain 79' | Referee: Paul Mente |

==== Round Seven ====
| 8 June 2019 | Free State XV | 80–7 | Border Bulldogs | Clive Solomon Stadium, Heidedal |
| 14:00 | Try: Bertie de Bod 3'; Tapiwa Mafura 7', 67', 78'; Francois Agenbag 12', 64'; Jamba Ulengo 16', 80'; Günther Janse van Vuuren 57'; Lubabalo Dobela 60', 74'; Dian Badenhorst 71'; Con: Lubabalo Dobela 4', 13', 18', 57', 61', 65', 67', 71', 79'; Adriaan Carelse 80' | Scoreboard | Try: Bangi Kobese 72'; Con: Dilolo Mapuko 72' | Referee: Vusi Msibi |

| 8 June 2019 | Zimbabwe Academy | 15–43 | Eastern Province Elephants | Brookside, Cape Town |
| 15:00 | Try: Sam Phiri 54'; Kuda Chiwanza 80'; Con: Kuzi Kazembe 80'; Pen: Jeremiah Jaravaza 13' | Scoreboard | Try: Martin du Toit 9'; Mihlali Mpafi 19'; Sherwin Slater 20'; Tristan Fourie 30'; Riaan Arends 41'; Stephan de Wit 62'; Oliver Zono 64'; Con: Richman Gora 9'; Oliver Zono 31', 41', 63' | Referee: Divan Uys |

| 9 June 2019 | Sharks XV | 40–17 | SWD Eagles | Florida Park, Parow |
| 12:30 | Try: Gideon Koegelenberg 7'; Jacques Ackerman 15'; Bandisa Ndlovu 25'; Luyanda Mngadi 33'; Leolin Zas 38'; Lwazi Mvovo 67'; Con: Rhyno Smith 8', 26', 33', 39', 68' | Scoreboard | Try: Shario Rosenkrantz 20'; Dewald Dekker 77'; Con: Gerhard Nortier 20'; Divan Nel 78'; Pen: Gerhard Nortier 37' | Referee: Egon Seconds |

| 9 June 2019 | Western Province | 21–22 | Boland Cavaliers | Florida Park, Parow |
| 14:30 | Try: Schalk Erasmus 16'; David Brits 53'; Con: Abner van Reenen 18'; Pen: Abner van Reenen 8', 44', 67' | Scoreboard | Try: Valentino Wellman 11'; Neil Rautenbach 24' penalty try 28'; Con: Garrick Mattheus 26'; Pen: Garrick Mattheus 72' | Referee: Griffin Colby |

== Title play-offs ==
=== Semifinals ===
| 16 June 2019 | Western Province | 21–50 | Griquas | KaNyamazane Stadium, Mbombela |
| 12:30 | Try: Craig Barry 13'; Brandon Valentyn 58'; Con: Abner van Reenen 59'; Pen: Abner van Reenen 39', 40', 43' | Scoreboard | Try: Enver Brandt 3', 49'; Gideon van der Merwe 31', 73'; Eduan Keyter 46'; Zak Burger 60'; Anthony Volmink 75'; Con: George Whitehead 32', 47', 50', 62', 75', 76'; Pen: George Whitehead 11' | Referee: Paul Mente |

| 16 June 2019 | Pumas | 57–32 | Boland Cavaliers | KaNyamazane Stadium, Mbombela |
| 14:30 | Try: Ruwellyn Isbell 7', 72'; Willie Engelbrecht 11'; Jeandré Rudolph 21'; Chris Smith 30'; Ryan Nell 35'; Corniel Els 59'; Devon Williams 64'; Marco Palvie 77'; Con: Chris Smith 12', 30', 36', 65', 73', 78'; Cards: Marko Janse van Rensburg (yellow card) 57' | Scoreboard | Try: Zandré Jordaan 23' penalty try 80'; Con: Garrick Mattheus 24'; Pen: Garrick Mattheus 4', 19', 40', 44', 52', 57' | Referee: Quinton Immelman |

=== Final ===
| 23 June 2019 | Pumas | 13–28 | Griquas | Saldanha Stadium, Saldanha Bay |
| 14:30 | Try: Devon Williams 29', 67'; Pen: Chris Smith 21' | Scoreboard | Try: Anthony Volmink 23'; AJ le Roux 53'; Eduan Keyter 76'; Con: George Whitehead 25', 77'; Pen: George Whitehead 7', 35', 39' | Referee: Ben Crouse |

== Honours ==
The honour roll for the 2019 Rugby Challenge was as follows:

2019 Rugby Challenge
| Champions: | Griquas (1st title) |
| Top points scorer: | George Whitehead, Griquas (95) |
| Top try scorer: | Jamba Ulengo, Griquas (10) |

== Referees ==
The following referees officiated matches in the 2019 Rugby Challenge:

2019 Rugby Challenge referees
Christopher Allison • Aimee Barrett-Theron • Stuart Berry • Griffin Colby • Ben Crouse • Stephan Geldenhuys • Quinton Immelman • Cwengile Jadezweni • Jaco Kotze • Ruhan Meiring • Paul Mente • Vusi Msibi • Jaco Pretorius • Rasta Rasivhenge • Egon Seconds • Archie Sehlako • Divan Uys

== See also ==
- 2019 Currie Cup Premier Division
- 2019 Currie Cup First Division
