= Faletoi Peni =

Samoan rugby union player

- Full name: Faalae Faletoi Peni
- Born: 6 April 2000 (age 26) Māngere, New Zealand
- Height: 173 cm (5 ft 8 in)
- Weight: 106 kg (234 lb; 16 st 10 lb)
- School: Kelston Boys' High School

Rugby union career
- Position: First five-eighth / Midfielder
- Current team: Southland
Senior career
Years	Team	Apps	(Points)
2024–	Southland	16	(15)
2025	New England Free Jacks	6	(13)
2026	Moana Pasifika		
- Correct as of 9 November 2025
International career
Years	Team	Apps	(Points)
2025–	Samoa	3	(0)
- Correct as of 9 November 2025

Faletoi Peni (born 6 April 2000) is a Samoan rugby union player, who plays for Southland. His preferred position is first five-eighth or midfield.

== Early career ==
Peni is from Māngere in South Auckland. He attended Kelston Boys' High School but had the majority of his early rugby success playing club rugby where he played for Manukau Rovers leading them to two consecutive Auckland championships. Peni spent time in the academy set up for Counties Manukau in 2021, but despite his club appearances did not make either the Counties or Auckland full squads.

== Professional career ==
Peni has represented Southland in the National Provincial Championship since 2024, being named in the squad for the 2025 Bunnings NPC. He had only signed for Southland in a trial contract in 2024 when he made his debuts due to injury, before winning the Southland rookie of the year award. In 2025, he signed for New England Free Jacks for the 2025 Major League Rugby season. He then signed for Moana Pasifika ahead of the 2026 Super Rugby Pacific season.

Following the folding of Moana Pasifika at the end of the 2026 season, Peni signed for RC Narbonne in ProD2.

Peni made his international debut for Samoa in 2025, debuting in the 2027 Rugby World Cup qualifiers against Brazil.
