= Kirill Golosnitsky =

Russian rugby union player

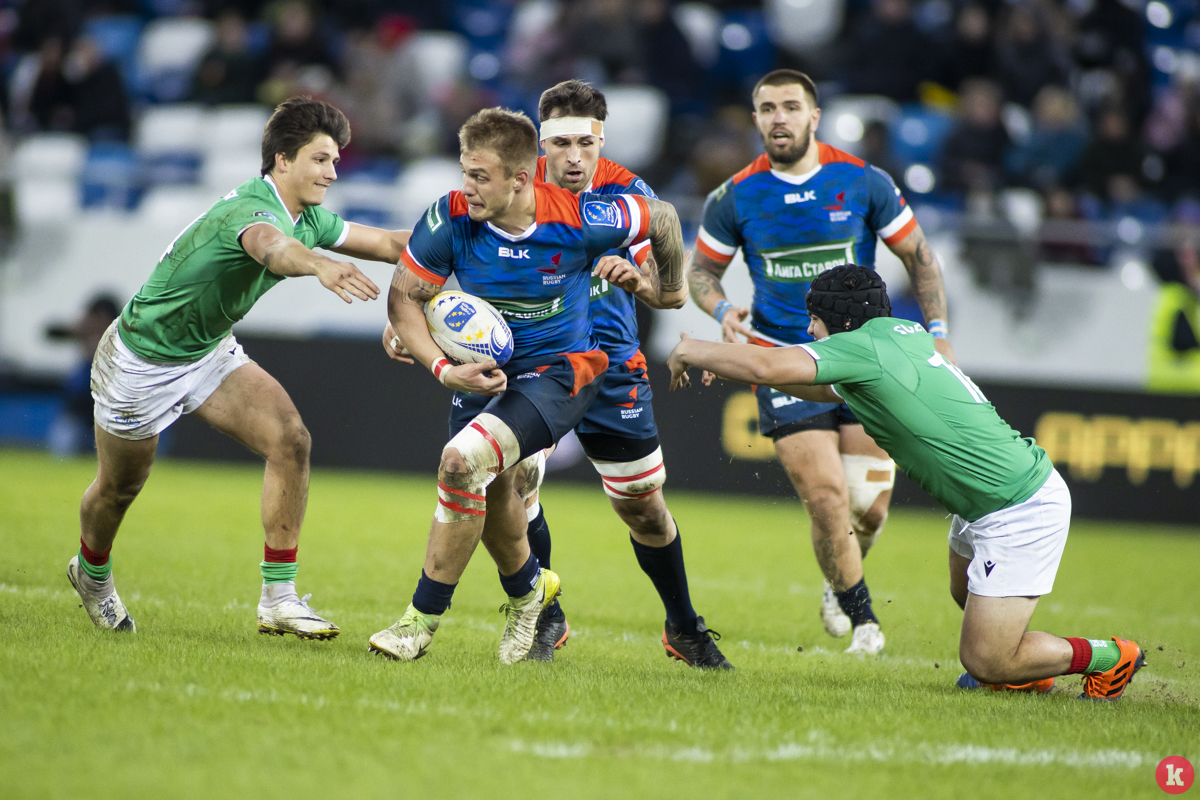
- Full name: Kirill Kirillovich Golosnitsky
- Born: 30 May 1994 (age 32) Moscow
- Height: 1.85 m (6 ft 1 in)
- Weight: 105 kg (16 st 7 lb; 231 lb)

Rugby union career
- Position: Wing
- Current team: RC Dynamo Moscow
Senior career
| Years | Team | Apps | (Points) |
| 2014–2015 | RC Zelenograd | | |
| 2016–2019 | Krasny Yar | | |
| 2020–2022 | VVA–Podmoskovye | | |
| 2022–present | RC Dynamo Moscow | | |
- Correct as of 13 July 2022
International career
| Years | Team | Apps | (Points) |
| 2016–present | Russia | 22 | (20) |
- Correct as of 3 October 2019

Kirill Golosnitsky (Russian: Кирилл Кириллович Голосницкий; born 30 May 1994) is a Russian rugby union player who generally plays as a wing in RC Dynamo Moscow and the Russia national team.

He was included in the Russian squad for the 2019 Rugby World Cup which was held in Japan for the first time and also marks his first World Cup appearance.

== Career ==
He made his international debut for Russia against United States on 25 June 2016.

He scored the first try of the 2019 Rugby World Cup in the tournament opener against hosts Japan in the fourth minute of the match which was held on 20 September 2019. It was the fastest ever try scored in the opening match of a World Cup. The match also marked his first World Cup match appearance and Japan managed to defeat Russia despite conceding an early lead.

=== International Tries ===
As of 10 August 2022

| Try | Opposing team | Location | Venue | Competition | Date | Result | Score |
|---|---|---|---|---|---|---|---|
| 1 | Uruguay | Montevideo, Uruguay | Estadio Charrúa | 2019 World Rugby Nations Cup | 4 June 2019 | Loss | 48–26 |
| 2 | Italy | San Benedetto del Tronto, Italy | Stadio Riviera delle Palme | 2019 Rugby World Cup warm-up matches | 17 August 2019 | Loss | 85–15 |
| 3 | Japan | Tokyo, Japan | Tokyo Stadium | 2019 Rugby World Cup | 20 September 2019 | Loss | 30–10 |
| 4 | Romania | Krasnodar, Russia | Kuban Stadium | 2020 Rugby Europe Championship | 7 March 2020 | Win | 32–25 |
