= Kenilworth School and Sixth Form =

Location
- Glasshouse Lane; West Midlands; Kenilworth, Warwickshire, CV8 2AL; England; 52°20′53″N 1°33′14″W

Information
- Former name: Kenilworth School & Sports College
- Type: Academy
- Motto: Aspiring to Excellence
- Local authority: Warwickshire County Council
- Trust: Kenilworth Multi Academy Trust
- Department for Education URN: 146697 Tables
- Ofsted: Reports
- Head teacher: Simon Bennet
- Years offered: 7-13
- Gender: Coeducational
- Age: 11 to 18
- Enrolment: 1,836
- Capacity: 2200
- Website: www.ksn.org.uk

Kenilworth School and Sixth Form, also known as Kenilworth School and Sports College, is a coeducational secondary school and sixth form based in Glasshouse Lane, Kenilworth, Warwickshire, England.

== History ==
Built in 1961 Kenilworth School was three schools from the 1960s until 1978, Abbey High School, Castle High School & Kenilworth Grammar School. The three sites were then merged into Kenilworth School, with Castle High School becoming Castle Sixth Form, the Grammar school becoming Priory Hall and Abbey High becoming Abbey Hall. Both Halls were then overseen by the Principal of Kenilworth School who was Mr Wilson. In 1990 Priory became Upper School and Abbey became Lower School and the concept of one Principal and three Headteachers (Abbey, Priory and Castle) was done away with in favour of one Headteacher of all three sites. The name changed to Kenilworth School & Sports College.

In February 2013 the school was inspected by Ofsted – the grading awarded was 1 (Outstanding) in every category (Leadership & Management / Teaching & Learning / Behaviour & Safety / Achievement); this was an improvement on the previous inspection five years before when the school was awarded 2 (good) under the old Ofsted framework.

Previously a foundation school administered by Warwickshire County Council, in January 2019 Kenilworth School & Sports College converted to academy status and was renamed Kenilworth School & Sixth Form.

The school has relocated to the site of Southcrest Farm on Glasshouse Lane as of September 2023, expanding the capacity to 2200 pupils, having taken ownership of the new site in December 2020.

In 2020 a memoir of Kenilworth School was published by ex-pupil Lance Manley. Entitled 6 of One it covers the period 1977 to 1990 and was written by ex-pupils and a former teacher. All profits are being donated to Northleigh House School in Warwick, a school for vulnerable children.

A farewell festival party was held at the old Upper School site on 1 July 2023. All profits went towards the new building in Glasshouse Lane.

On 6 September 2023, Kenilworth School moved to new premises in Glasshouse Lane. This site absorbed the former Upper and Lower schools of Leyes Lane and also Castle 6th form on Rouncil Lane. The old sites are now inactive and are owned by Warwickshire County Council. A new head teacher, Darren Nicholas began his tenure as the new school opened, and left 2 years after opening it.

== School today ==
As of September 2023, the formerly separate lower, upper and sixth form are now located within the one school building at Glasshouse Lane.

=== Sixth form ===
The sixth form offers A levels and BTECs. In 2023, Ofsted judged the sixth form as 'outstanding'.

== Notable pupils ==
- Tim Flowers (born 1967), footballer
- Kelvin Langmead (born 1985), footballer
- Alice Lowe (born 1977), actor
- Jake Minshull (born 2004), athlete
