= Ruan Ludick =

Namibia international rugby union player

- Full name: Ruan Ludick
- Born: 7 September 1994 (age 32) Pretoria, South Africa
- Height: 2.08 m (6 ft 10 in)
- Weight: 118 kg (18 st 8 lb; 260 lb)
- School: Windhoek Gymnasium Private School
- Notable relative: Adriaan Ludick (brother)

Rugby union career
- Position: Lock
- Current team: Welwitschias
Amateur team(s)
Years	Team	Apps	(Points)
- Wanderers
2016	Merthyr	0	(0)
Senior career
Years	Team	Apps	(Points)
2016–present	Welwitschias	27	(0)
- Correct as of 26 June 2018
International career
Years	Team	Apps	(Points)
2016–present	Namibia	16	(0)
- Correct as of 16 November 2018

Ruan Ludick (born 7 September 1994) is a Namibian rugby union player, currently playing with the Namibia national team and the Welwitschias in South African domestic rugby. His regular position is lock.

== Rugby career ==
Ludick was born in Pretoria in South Africa, but grew up in Windhoek. He made his test debut for Namibia in 2016 against Romania. He also represented the Welwitschias in the South African domestic Currie Cup and Vodacom Cup competitions since 2016.

In December 2016, he joined Welsh Premier Division side Merthyr on a two-year deal.
