= Facundo Cordero =

Argentine rugby union player

- Born: 31 July 1998 (age 28) Argentina
- Height: 175 cm (5 ft 9 in)
- Weight: 83 kg (183 lb; 13 st 1 lb)
- Notable relative: Santiago Cordero (brother)

Rugby union career
- Position: Wing / Fullback
Senior career
| Years | Team | Apps | (Points) |
| 2017–2019 | Regatas Bella Vista | 22 | (25) |
| 2019 | Jaguares XV | 5 | (35) |
| 2020 | Ceibos | 2 | (10) |
| 2020–2023 | Exeter Chiefs | 33 | (40) |
| 2023-25 | Glasgow Warriors | 6 | (5) |
| 2025- | Regatas Bella Vista | | |
International career
| Years | Team | Apps | (Points) |
| 2017– | Argentina XV | 10 | (45) |
| 2021– | Argentina | 1 | (0) |

Facundo Cordero (born 31 July 1998) is an Argentine rugby union player who plays for Regatas Bella Vista. He previously played for Glasgow Warriors in the United Rugby Championship. His playing position is wing or fullback.

== Rugby Union career ==
=== Professional career ===
He joined the Exeter Chiefs in July 2020, having previously played in his homeland for Jaguares XV in the 2019 Currie Cup First Division and Ceibos in the first Súper Liga Americana de Rugby season.

In 2023, he signed with Glasgow Warriors from Exeter Chiefs with immediate effect for the remainder of the 2022/2023 season.

He made his competitive debut for Glasgow Warriors on 17 February 2024, starting on the wing against the Dragons. He scored a try in the 40 - 7 win for the Glasgow side. He became Glasgow Warrior No. 358.

After leaving Glasgow Warriors in 2025, he re-signed for his former club Regatas Bella Vista.

=== International career ===
He also represented Argentina XV ten times between 2017 and 2019. His performances for the Chiefs saw him named in the Argentina squad for the 2021 internationals. He is the brother of fellow Argentine international Santiago Cordero.
