= Niël van Vuuren =

Namibia international rugby union player

- Full name: Daniël Rudolf van Vuuren
- Born: 31 May 1991 (age 35) Windhoek, Namibia
- Height: 1.81 m (5 ft 11 1/2 in)
- Weight: 93 kg (205 lb; 14 st 9 lb)
- School: Windhoek High School
- University: North-West University (Potchefstroom)

Rugby union career
- Position: Hooker
- Current team: Welwitschias
Senior career
Years	Team	Apps	(Points)
2015–present	Welwitschias	35	(15)
- Correct as of 22 July 2018
International career
Years	Team	Apps	(Points)
2017	Namibia	8	(5)
- Correct as of 16 November 2018

Daniël Rudolf van Vuuren (born 31 May 1991) is a Namibian rugby union player for the Welwitschias in the Currie Cup and the Rugby Challenge. His regular position is hooker.

== Rugby career ==
Van Vuuren was born in Windhoek. He made his test debut for Namibia in 2017 against Uganda and represented the Welwitschias in the South African domestic Currie Cup, Rugby Challenge and Vodacom Cup competitions since 2015.
