= Connor Tupai =

NZ rugby union player

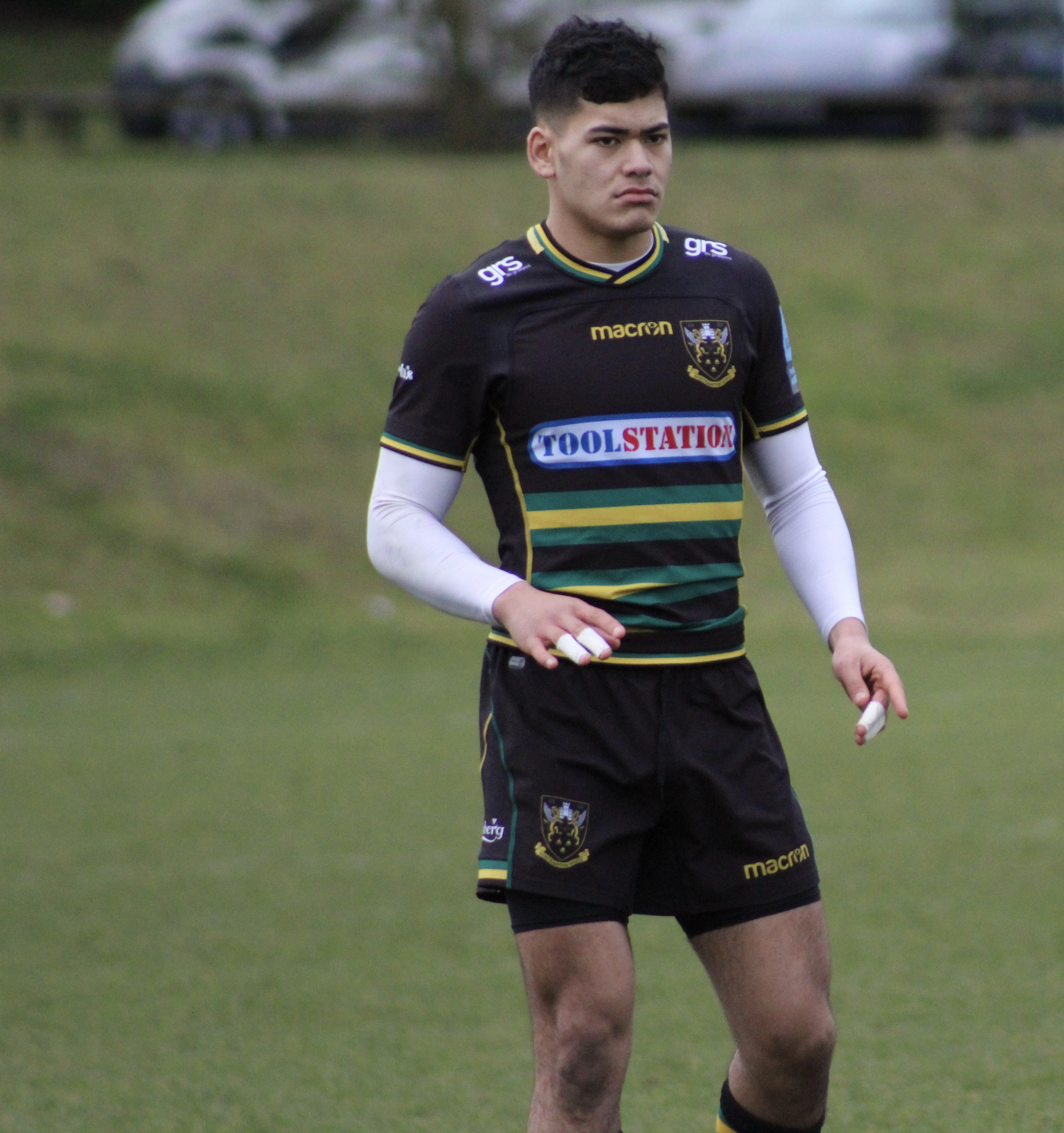
- Born: 8 December 1999 (age 26) Rotorua, New Zealand
- Height: 1.87 m (6 ft 2 in)
- Weight: 89 kg (14 st 0 lb; 196 lb)
- School: Northampton School for Boys
- Notable relative: Paul Tupai (father)

Rugby union career
- Position: Scrum-Half
Senior career
Years	Team	Apps	(Points)
2018–	Northampton Saints	9	(0)
- Correct as of 31 December 2019

Connor Tupai (born 8 December 1999) is a New Zealand born rugby union player currently playing for San Diego Legion in Major League Rugby. He plays as a Scrum-Half.

Connor is the son of Paul Tupai who played over one thousand rugby union games for club and country across a 28-year playing career.

Tupai was born in Rotorua, New Zealand on 8 December 1999. At the age of 6 he moved to England with his family. His father, Paul Tupai had been playing for Bay of Plenty, stepping down in October 2005. Following a tour to England with Samoa rugby, he was spotted by Budge Pountney, director of rugby at Northampton Saints at the time. Paul Tupai signed for Northampton in December 2005.

Connor Tupai began his rugby career playing for his school, Northampton School for Boys. He was billed as a dynamic utility back during his school playing career, excelling at fly-half and centre.

In 2016, Tupai and the NSB team reached the 2016 NatWest Schools Cup Vase final at Twickenham Stadium. Connor scored a game winning drop goal and claimed man of the match.

He has a close relationship with retired Saints and England Rugby captain, Dylan Hartley. Hartley and Connor's father moved to Northampton from Rotorua at a similar time. Tupai took Hartley under his wing who in turn babysat the young Connor Tupai, teaching him ball skills. Their brotherly relationship remains strong today.

Tupai joined the Northampton Saints junior academy at a young age and was awarded his first professional contract with the club's senior academy in 2018.

The young scrum half appeared in his first Northampton senior game in the annual Mobbs Memorial Match against the Army Rugby Football Club in 2018.

He captained a young Northampton team during the Premiership Rugby Sevens Series in 2019. Hosted at Franklin's Gardens, the Saints team failed to win a game and did not progress in the competition, ultimately won by Saracens.

Following a steady string of off the bench appearances for Northampton, Tupai started his first European Rugby Champions Cup game against Leinster at the age of 20. Northampton lost, 50–21.

Prior to the 2024 season, Tupai signed with Major League Rugby side San Diego Legion.
