= André van den Berg =

Namibian rugby union player

- Full name: André van den Berg
- Born: 23 January 1998 (age 28) Namibia
- Height: 180 cm (5 ft 11 in)
- Weight: 92 kg (203 lb; 14 st 7 lb)
- School: Windhoek High School
- University: North-West University

Rugby union career
- Position(s): Fly-half, Fullback
- Current team: Wanderers Rugby Club
Senior career
Years	Team	Apps	(Points)
20??-	Wanderers Rugby Club	??	(??)
- Correct as of 30 October 2023
International career
Years	Team	Apps	(Points)
2016	Namibia under-18	??	(??)
2017	Namibia under-20	??	(??)
2022-	Namibia	7	(5)
- Correct as of 30 October 2023

André van den Berg (born 23 January 1998) is a Namibian rugby union player who plays for the Wanderers in the NRU Premier League.

== Career ==
=== Club ===
He joined the Wanderers after studying at North-West University in South Africa. In 2022 he started in the NRU Premier League final at fly-half, scoring 23 points in the 51–31 win over the University of Namibia. He was awarded Player of the Match. He was then later awarded sportsman of the year as well as players’ player of the year.

=== International ===
He was captain of the Namibia under-18 side at the 2016 Craven Week. He played for Namibia in the 2017 World Rugby Under 20 Trophy where he took the side to a 4th-place finish. He went on the make his full international debut in 2022 coming off the bench against Spain. He was named part of the Namibian squad for the 2023 Rugby World Cup, where he featured three times, including a start at fullback against Uruguay.
