= Adriaan Ludick =

Namibian rugby union player

- Born: 22 July 1998 (age 28)
- Height: 1.98 m (6 ft 6 in)
- Weight: 124 kg (273 lb)
- School: Paarl Gimnasium
- Notable relative: Ruan Ludick (brother)

Rugby union career
- Position: Lock
- Current team: Boland Cavaliers
Senior career
Years	Team	Apps	(Points)
2019–present	Boland Cavaliers	12	(10)
- Correct as of 25 August 2019
International career
Years	Team	Apps	(Points)
2018–present	Namibia	5	(0)
- Correct as of 21 July 2019

Adriaan Ludick (born 22 July 1998) is a Namibian rugby union player for South African side the Boland Cavaliers in the Currie Cup and the Rugby Challenge. His regular position is lock.

Ludick made his international debut for Namibia in 2018, in their end-of-year match against Russia in Krasnodar.
