= Louis van der Westhuizen (rugby union) =

Namibian rugby union player (born 1995)

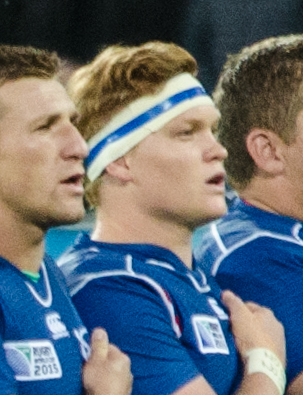
- Born: 25 February 1995 (age 31) Windhoek, Namibia
- Height: 1.80 m (5 ft 11 in)
- Weight: 100 kg (15 st 10 lb; 220 lb)
- School: Windhoek High School
- University: North-West University, South Africa

Rugby union career
- Position: Hooker
- Current team: Cheetahs / Free State Cheetahs
Youth career
- 2008: Namibia
- 2014–2016: Leopards
Amateur team(s)
Years	Team	Apps	(Points)
2016–2018	NWU Pukke	9	(14)
Senior career
Years	Team	Apps	(Points)
2016–2018	Leopards	28	(10)
2019	Welwitschias	2	(5)
2020	Bulls	0	(0)
2020–	Cheetahs	1	(0)
2020–	Free State Cheetahs	22	(85)
- Correct as of 10 July 2022
International career
Years	Team	Apps	(Points)
2013–present	Namibia	21	(45)
- Correct as of 10 July 2022

Louis van der Westhuizen (born 25 February 1995) is a Namibian rugby union player. He was named in Namibia's squad for the 2015, as well as the 2023 Rugby World Cup. His usual position is hooker.
