= Aranos Coetzee =

Namibia international rugby union player

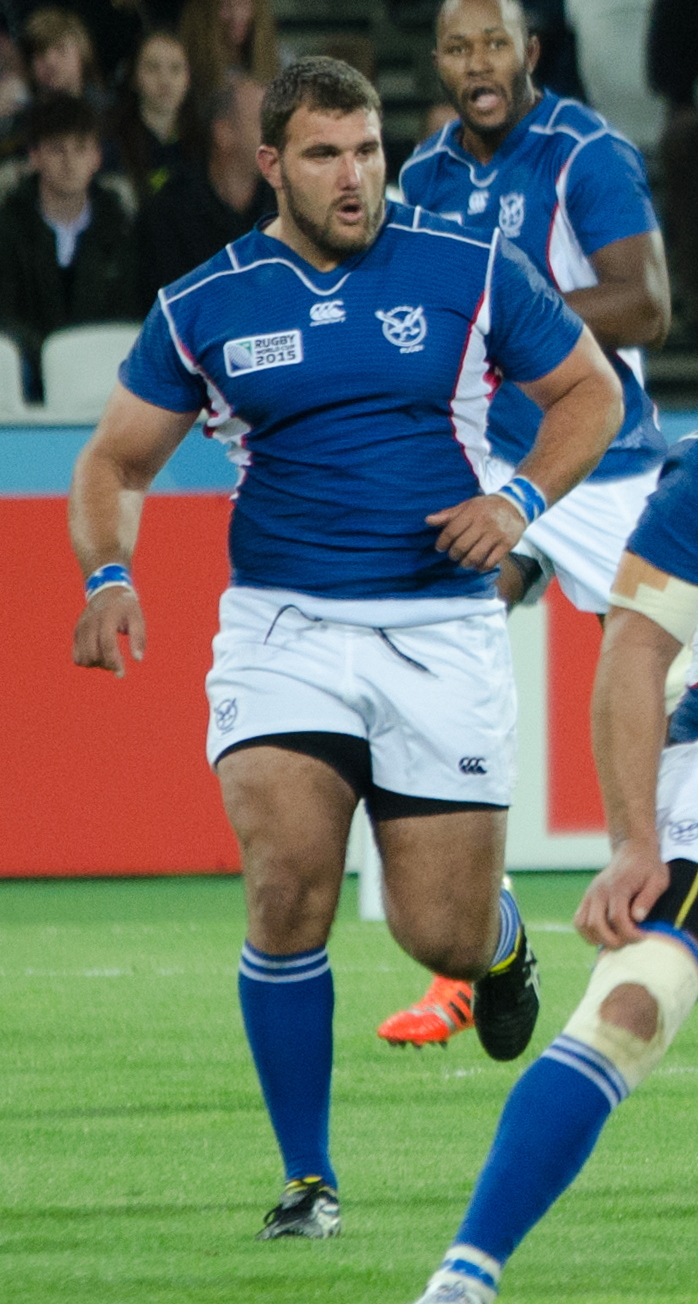
- Full name: Johannes Voges Coetzee
- Born: 14 March 1988 (age 38) Windhoek, South West Africa
- Height: 1.87 m (6 ft 1 1/2 in)
- Weight: 122 kg (269 lb; 19 st 3 lb)
- School: Hoër Landbouskool Boland, Paarl

Rugby union career
- Position: Prop
- Current team: Cheetahs / Free State Cheetahs
Youth career
- 2006: Western Province
- 2008–2009: Leopards
Amateur team(s)
Years	Team	Apps	(Points)
2010	NWU Pukke	8	(0)
Senior career
Years	Team	Apps	(Points)
2010	Leopards	11	(0)
2010–2012	Racing Métro	12	(0)
2012–2015	Brive	62	(0)
2016–present	Cheetahs	74	(0)
2016	Free State XV	4	(5)
2016–present	Free State Cheetahs	30	(0)
2022	Bath	5	(0)
- Correct as of 23 July 2022
International career
Years	Team	Apps	(Points)
2006	South Africa Under-18		
2015–present	Namibia	22	(5)
- Correct as of 10 July 2022

Johannes Voges 'Aranos' Coetzee (born 14 March 1988) is a Namibian rugby union player for the Cheetahs in the Pro14 and the Free State Cheetahs in the Currie Cup. His regular position is prop.

== Career ==
=== Youth / Western Province ===
Coetzee was born in Windhoek and went to primary school in Aranos before moving to South Africa to attend Hoër Landbouskool Boland in Paarl. He was selected to represent Western Province at the 2006 Academy Week and was subsequently included in a South Africa team that participated at the Under-18 Africa Cup.

=== Leopards / NWU Pukke ===
After high school, Coetzee moved to Potchefstroom, where he represented the Leopards U21s in the 2008 and 2009 Under-21 Provincial Championships.

Coetzee played Varsity Cup rugby for NWU Pukke during the 2010 Varsity Cup competition, making eight appearances as he helped Pukke reach the semi-finals of the competition for the third consecutive season, where they lost to eventual champions Maties.

Coetzee made his first class debut on 9 July 2010, playing off the bench in a 13–43 defeat to the Golden Lions in Phokeng in the 2010 Currie Cup Premier Division. He was mainly used as a replacement in the competition, making nine appearances off the bench, but he did make his first senior start in their 17–59 defeat to Western Province in Cape Town and also started their home match against the Blue Bulls two weeks later.

=== Racing Métro 92 ===
After the 2010 Currie Cup Premier Division, Coetzee moved to France, where he joined Top 14 side Racing Métro. He made a single appearance for them off the bench during the 2010–11 Top 14 season. In 2011–12, he played for them on seven occasions and also made his first start for them against Biarritz, helping them to finish in sixth spot on the log. He also played in the Heineken Cup competition for the first time, making four appearances as Racing Metro failed to progress from Pool 2; this included one start in their match against Edinburgh.

=== Brive ===
Coetzee moved to Brive for the 2012–13 Rugby Pro D2 season, where he became far more involved in first-team action, making 27 appearances for the side as they finished second in the competition behind Oyonnax and subsequently gaining promotion to the Top 14 for 2013–14 by beating Pau 30–10 in the promotion play-off final.

Coetzee made fifteen appearances for Brive in the 2013–14 Top 14 season as they finished in ninth spot on the log. He made another seven appearances in the 2013–14 European Challenge Cup, where he helped them to top Pool 3 with five wins and a draw to qualify for the Quarter Finals, where they lost 7–39 to English Premiership side Bath.

Coetzee's involvement in 2014–15 was more limited, playing in nine matches during their Top 14 season as they narrowly avoided relegation, finishing in tenth spot, but just one log point ahead of relegated Bayonne. He also played in four matches in their European Rugby Challenge Cup campaign that saw them lose all six their matches.

=== Free State Cheetahs ===
Coetzee then returned to South Africa to rejoin the Free State Cheetahs for the 2015 Currie Cup Premier Division, despite expectations that he would miss the majority of the tournament through his involvement with Namibia at the 2015 Rugby World Cup.

=== International ===
In 2006, Coetzee represented South Africa at the Under-18 Africa Cup.

However, he switched allegiances to his country of birth, Namibia, and made his test debut for them on 6 June 2015 in their 2015 Africa Cup match against Tunisia in Nabeul.

Coetzee was also named in a 50-man Namibian training squad prior to the 2015 Rugby World Cup.
