= Adriaan Booysen =

Namibian rugby union player

- Full name: Jan Adriaan Booysen
- Born: 17 May 1996 (age 30) Gobabis, Namibia
- Height: 1.90 m (6 ft 3 in)
- Weight: 112 kg (247 lb; 17 st 9 lb)
- School: Privaatskool Elnatan

Rugby union career
- Position: Number eight
Senior career
Years	Team	Apps	(Points)
2017–2019	Welwitschias	15	(15)
2020–2021	Houston Sabercats	21	(20)
2022	Dallas Jackals		
- Correct as of 20 March 2022
International career
Years	Team	Apps	(Points)
2017-present	Namibia	7	(5)
- Correct as of 23 January 2020

Jan Adriaan Booysen (born 17 May 1996) is a Namibian rugby union player for the Dallas Jackals in Major League Rugby (MLR), having previously played for the Houston SaberCats.

He previously played for the Welwitschias in the Currie Cup and the Rugby Challenge. His regular position is number eight.

== Rugby career ==
Booysen was born in Gobabis. He made his test debut for Namibia in 2017 against Senegal and represented the Welwitschias in the South African domestic Currie Cup and Rugby Challenge since 2017.
