= Cliven Loubser =

Namibian rugby union player

- Full name: Cliven Sven James Loubser
- Born: 24 February 1997 (age 29) Rehoboth, Namibia
- Height: 1.76 m (5 ft 9 1/2 in)
- Weight: 85 kg (187 lb; 13 st 5 lb)
- School: Windhoek Gymnasium

Rugby union career
- Position: Fly-half
- Current team: Anthem Rugby Carolina
Youth career
- 2016: Eastern Province U19
- 2017: Sharks U21
- 2018: UP Tuks
Amateur team(s)
Years	Team	Apps	(Points)
2019–2020	Wanderers F.C.		
2019–2020	Welwitschias	14	(41)
Senior career
Years	Team	Apps	(Points)
2020	Yorkshire Carnegie	1	(0)
2021–2023	Utah Warriors	27	(96)
2024	Anthem Rugby Carolina	0	(0)
- Correct as of 4 February 2024
International career
Years	Team	Apps	(Points)
2017–present	Namibia	26	(240)
- Correct as of 16 July 2023

Cliven Sven James Loubser (born 24 February 1997) is a Namibian rugby union player, who currently plays for Anthem Rugby Carolina in Major League Rugby (MLR). He represents Namibia internationally. His regular position is fly-half.

Loubser previously played for Yorkshire Carnegie in the RFU Championship and Utah Warriors (MLR).

== International career ==
Loubser was born in Rehoboth. He made his test debut for Namibia in 2017 against Russia.
