= Johan Retief (rugby union) =

Namibia international rugby union player

- Full name: Johannes Adriaan Retief
- Born: 10 October 1995 (age 31) Windhoek, Namibia
- Height: 1.95 m (6 ft 5 in)
- Weight: 112 kg (247 lb; 17 st 9 lb)
- School: Windhoek Gymnasium

Rugby union career
- Position: Lock / Flank
- Current team: Krasny Yar Krasnoyarsk
Senior career
Years	Team	Apps	(Points)
2018–2021	Leopards	19	(5)
2022–2024	Griquas	13	(0)
2025–	Krasny Yar Krasnoyarsk	0	(0)
- Correct as of 25 March 2025
International career
Years	Team	Apps	(Points)
2014–2015	Namibia U20	8	(0)
2017–present	Namibia	29	(5)
- Correct as of 10 July 2022

Johannes Adriaan Retief (born 10 October 1995) is a Namibian rugby union player for the Namibian national team and for the Krasny Yar Krasnoyarsk. His regular position is lock or flank.

== Rugby career ==
Retief was born in Windhoek. He made his test debut for Namibia in 2017 against Spain and represented the Leopards in the South African domestic Currie Cup and Rugby Challenge since 2018.
