= 2019 Rugby World Cup squads =

The 2019 Rugby World Cup was an international rugby union tournament which was held in Japan from 20 September until 2 November 2019. Twenty national teams competed, and each brought a 31-man squad containing no regulated number of players per-position to the tournament. The tournament was administered by World Rugby, to whom each team submitted their finalised squad by 8 September 2019. A player may be replaced for medical or compassionate reasons, but would be unable to return to the squad. Any replacement player has an enforced stand-down period of 48 hours before they can take the field.

Players marked (c) were named as captain for their national squad.

The age listed for each player is on 20 September 2019, the first day of the tournament. The numbers of caps for each player do not include any matches played after the start of tournament.

== Overview ==
Below is a table listing all the head coaches and captains for each nation.

Team	Coach	Captain
Argentina	(Argentina) Mario Ledesma	Pablo Matera
Australia	(Australia) Michael Cheika	Michael Hooper
Canada	(Wales) Kingsley Jones	Tyler Ardron
England	(Australia) Eddie Jones	Owen Farrell
Fiji	(New Zealand) John McKee	Dominiko Waqaniburotu
France	(France) Jacques Brunel	Guilhem Guirado
Georgia	(New Zealand) Milton Haig	Merab Sharikadze
Ireland	(New Zealand) Joe Schmidt	Rory Best
Italy	(Ireland) Conor O'Shea	Sergio Parisse
Japan	(New Zealand) Jamie Joseph	Michael Leitch
Namibia	(Wales) Phil Davies	Johan Deysel
New Zealand	(New Zealand) Steve Hansen	Kieran Read
Russia	(Wales) Lyn Jones	Vasily Artemyev
Samoa	(New Zealand) Steve Jackson	Jack Lam
Scotland	(Scotland) Gregor Townsend	Stuart McInally
South Africa	(South Africa) Rassie Erasmus	Siya Kolisi
Tonga	(Australia) Toutai Kefu	Siale Piutau
United States	(South Africa) Gary Gold	Blaine Scully
Uruguay	(Argentina) Esteban Meneses	Juan Manuel Gaminara
Wales	(New Zealand) Warren Gatland	Alun Wyn Jones

== Pool A ==
=== Ireland ===
Ireland announced a 31-man squad for the tournament on 2 September 2019.

^{1} On 29 September, Jordi Murphy replaced Jack Conan, who suffered a foot injury in training.

^{2} On 16 October, Rob Herring replaced Seán Cronin following an injury.

Head coach: (New Zealand) Joe Schmidt

Player	Position	Date of birth (age)	Caps	Club/province
Rory Best (c)	Hooker	15 August 1982 (aged 37)	120	Ulster
Seán Cronin^{2}	Hooker	6 May 1986 (aged 33)	70	Leinster
Niall Scannell	Hooker	8 April 1992 (aged 27)	16	Munster
Rob Herring^{2}	Hooker	27 April 1990 (aged 29)	7	Ulster
Tadhg Furlong	Prop	14 November 1992 (aged 26)	36	Leinster
Cian Healy	Prop	7 October 1987 (aged 31)	91	Leinster
Dave Kilcoyne	Prop	14 December 1988 (aged 30)	31	Munster
Andrew Porter	Prop	16 January 1996 (aged 23)	18	Leinster
John Ryan	Prop	2 August 1988 (aged 31)	20	Munster
Tadhg Beirne	Lock	8 January 1992 (aged 27)	8	Munster
Iain Henderson	Lock	21 February 1992 (aged 27)	48	Ulster
Jean Kleyn	Lock	26 August 1993 (aged 26)	3	Munster
James Ryan	Lock	24 July 1996 (aged 23)	19	Leinster
Jack Conan ^{1}	Back row	29 July 1992 (aged 27)	16	Leinster
Jordi Murphy ^{1}	Back row	22 April 1991 (aged 28)	29	Ulster
Peter O'Mahony	Back row	17 September 1989 (aged 30)	59	Munster
Rhys Ruddock	Back row	13 November 1990 (aged 28)	23	Leinster
CJ Stander	Back row	5 April 1990 (aged 29)	33	Munster
Josh van der Flier	Back row	25 April 1993 (aged 26)	19	Leinster
Luke McGrath	Scrum-half	3 February 1993 (aged 26)	14	Leinster
Conor Murray	Scrum-half	20 April 1989 (aged 30)	77	Munster
Joey Carbery	Fly-half	1 November 1995 (aged 23)	19	Munster
Jack Carty	Fly-half	31 August 1992 (aged 27)	7	Connacht
Johnny Sexton	Fly-half	11 July 1985 (aged 34)	84	Leinster
Bundee Aki	Centre	7 April 1990 (aged 29)	20	Connacht
Chris Farrell	Centre	16 March 1993 (aged 26)	7	Munster
Robbie Henshaw	Centre	12 June 1993 (aged 26)	38	Leinster
Garry Ringrose	Centre	26 January 1995 (aged 24)	24	Leinster
Andrew Conway	Wing	11 July 1991 (aged 28)	15	Munster
Keith Earls	Wing	2 October 1987 (aged 31)	78	Munster
Jacob Stockdale	Wing	6 April 1996 (aged 23)	21	Ulster
Rob Kearney	Fullback	26 March 1986 (aged 33)	92	Leinster
Jordan Larmour	Fullback	10 June 1997 (aged 22)	16	Leinster

=== Japan ===
Japan named a 41-man training squad for the tournament on 15 August 2019, before confirming their final 31-man squad on 29 August.

Head coach: (New Zealand) Jamie Joseph

Player	Position	Date of birth (age)	Caps	Club/province
Shota Horie	Hooker	21 January 1986 (aged 33)	61	Panasonic Wild Knights
Takuya Kitade	Hooker	14 September 1992 (aged 27)	1	Suntory Sungoliath
Atsushi Sakate	Hooker	21 June 1993 (aged 26)	17	Panasonic Wild Knights
Asaeli Ai Valu	Prop	7 May 1989 (aged 30)	9	Panasonic Wild Knights
Keita Inagaki	Prop	2 June 1990 (aged 29)	29	Panasonic Wild Knights
Koo Ji-won	Prop	20 July 1994 (aged 25)	8	Honda Heat
Yusuke Kizu	Prop	2 December 1995 (aged 23)	3	Toyota Verblitz
Isileli Nakajima	Prop	9 July 1989 (aged 30)	3	Kobelco Steelers
Uwe Helu	Lock	12 July 1990 (aged 29)	14	Yamaha Júbilo
James Moore	Lock	11 June 1993 (aged 26)	3	Munakata Sanix Blues
Luke Thompson	Lock	16 April 1981 (aged 38)	67	Kintetsu Liners
Wimpie van der Walt	Lock	6 January 1989 (aged 30)	12	NTT DoCoMo Red Hurricanes
Kazuki Himeno	Loose forward	27 July 1994 (aged 25)	12	Toyota Verblitz
Michael Leitch (c)	Loose forward	7 October 1988 (aged 30)	63	Toshiba Brave Lupus
Lappies Labuschagné	Loose forward	11 January 1989 (aged 30)	3	Kubota Spears
Amanaki Mafi	Loose forward	21 January 1990 (aged 29)	25	NTT Communications Shining Arcs
Yoshitaka Tokunaga	Loose forward	10 April 1992 (aged 27)	12	Toshiba Brave Lupus
Hendrik Tui	Loose forward	13 December 1987 (aged 31)	44	Suntory Sungoliath
Yutaka Nagare	Scrum-half	4 September 1992 (aged 27)	19	Suntory Sungoliath
Kaito Shigeno	Scrum-half	21 November 1990 (aged 28)	10	Toyota Verblitz
Fumiaki Tanaka	Scrum-half	3 January 1985 (aged 34)	70	Canon Eagles
Rikiya Matsuda	Fly-half	3 May 1994 (aged 25)	20	Panasonic Wild Knights
Yu Tamura	Fly-half	9 January 1989 (aged 30)	57	Canon Eagles
Timothy Lafaele	Centre	19 August 1991 (aged 28)	18	Kubota Spears
Ryoto Nakamura	Centre	3 June 1991 (aged 28)	19	Suntory Sungoliath
Will Tupou	Centre	20 July 1990 (aged 29)	10	Coca-Cola Red Sparks
Kenki Fukuoka	Wing	7 September 1992 (aged 27)	34	Panasonic Wild Knights
Lomano Lemeki	Wing	30 January 1989 (aged 30)	11	Honda Heat
Ataata Moeakiola	Wing	6 February 1996 (aged 23)	4	Kobelco Steelers
Kotaro Matsushima	Fullback	26 February 1993 (aged 26)	34	Suntory Sungoliath
Ryohei Yamanaka	Fullback	22 June 1988 (aged 31)	13	Kobelco Steelers

=== Russia ===
Russia named their 31-man squad for the tournament on 1 September.

Head coach: (Wales) Lyn Jones

Player	Position	Date of birth (age)	Caps	Club/province
Sergey Chernyshev	Hooker	13 May 1988 (aged 31)	10	Slava Moscow
Evgeny Matveev	Hooker	15 April 1985 (aged 34)	58	VVA-Podmoskovye
Stanislav Sel'skiy	Hooker	2 September 1991 (aged 28)	35	Enisey-STM
Azamat Bitiev	Prop	9 December 1989 (aged 29)	19	Krasny Yar
Kirill Gotovtsev	Prop	17 July 1987 (aged 32)	3	Krasny Yar
Valery Morozov	Prop	21 September 1994 (aged 24)	17	(England) Sale Sharks
Vladimir Podrezov	Prop	27 January 1994 (aged 25)	25	VVA-Podmoskovye
Andrey Polivalov	Prop	9 August 1986 (aged 33)	25	VVA-Podmoskovye
Evgeny Elgin	Lock	10 March 1987 (aged 32)	24	Enisey-STM
Bogdan Fedotko	Lock	22 September 1994 (aged 24)	20	Krasny Yar
Andrey Garbuzov	Lock	7 August 1983 (aged 36)	94	Krasny Yar
Andrei Ostrikov	Lock	2 July 1987 (aged 32)	33	(France) Grenoble
Tagir Gadzhiev	Back row	29 March 1994 (aged 25)	27	Kuban
Victor Gresev	Back row	31 March 1986 (aged 33)	98	Krasny Yar
Roman Khodin	Back row	6 September 1993 (aged 26)	4	Kuban
Anton Sychev	Back row	5 February 1994 (aged 25)	14	Metallurg
Nikita Vavilin	Back row	13 May 1994 (aged 25)	10	Slava Moscow
Vitaly Zhivatov	Back row	16 February 1992 (aged 27)	9	VVA-Podmoskovye
Vasily Dorofeev	Scrum-half	6 August 1990 (aged 29)	22	Krasny Yar
Dmitry Perov	Scrum-half	18 November 1984 (aged 34)	10	VVA-Podmoskovye
Ramil Gaisin	Fly-half	26 July 1991 (aged 28)	44	Enisey-STM
Yuri Kushnarev	Fly-half	6 June 1985 (aged 34)	109	Krasny Yar
Sergey Yanyushkin	Fly-half	16 November 1986 (aged 32)	15	Lokomotiv Penza
Igor Galinovskiy	Centre	8 November 1985 (aged 33)	49	Krasny Yar
Dmitry Gerasimov	Centre	16 April 1988 (aged 31)	64	Enisey-STM
Kirill Golosnitsky	Centre	30 May 1994 (aged 25)	9	Krasny Yar
Vladimir Ostroushko	Centre	30 September 1986 (aged 32)	46	Kuban
German Davydov	Wing	10 March 1994 (aged 25)	17	VVA-Podmoskovye
Denis Simplikevich	Wing	11 March 1991 (aged 28)	28	Enisey-STM
Vladislav Sozonov	Wing	9 October 1993 (aged 25)	8	VVA-Podmoskovye
Vasily Artemyev (c)	Fullback	24 July 1987 (aged 32)	86	Krasny Yar

=== Samoa ===
Samoa named a 34-man training squad for the tournament on 23 August 2019, before reducing it to a final 31 on 31 August.

^{1} On 9 September, Pele Cowley replaced Scott Malolua, who suffered a knee injury in Samoa's final warm-up match.

^{2} On 26 September, Alamanda Motuga joined the squad in Japan after Afa Amosa sustained an injury in Samoa's opening match.

Head coach: (New Zealand) Steve Jackson

Player	Position	Date of birth (age)	Caps	Club/province
Seilala Lam	Hooker	18 February 1989 (aged 30)	13	(France) Perpignan
Motu Matu'u	Hooker	30 April 1987 (aged 32)	21	(England) London Irish
Ray Niuia	Hooker	14 October 1991 (aged 27)	4	(New Zealand) Highlanders
Michael Alaalatoa	Prop	28 August 1991 (aged 28)	1	(New Zealand) Crusaders
Paul Alo-Emile	Prop	22 December 1991 (aged 27)	13	(France) Stade Français
James Lay	Prop	16 December 1993 (aged 25)	10	(England) Bristol Bears
Jordan Lay	Prop	5 November 1992 (aged 26)	16	(England) Bristol Bears
Logovi'i Mulipola	Prop	11 March 1987 (aged 32)	30	(England) Newcastle Falcons
Kane Le'aupepe	Lock	3 December 1992 (aged 26)	6	(New Zealand) Hurricanes
Filo Paulo	Lock	6 November 1987 (aged 31)	34	Unattached
Senio Toleafoa	Lock	26 August 1993 (aged 26)	2	(France) Nevers
Josh Tyrell	Lock	16 October 1990 (aged 28)	7	(France) Oyonnax
Afa Amosa ^{2}	Loose forward	11 October 1990 (aged 28)	3	(France) Bordeaux-Bègles
Piula Faʻasalele	Loose forward	22 January 1988 (aged 31)	18	(France) Perpignan
TJ Ioane	Loose forward	9 May 1989 (aged 30)	21	(England) London Irish
Jack Lam (c)	Loose forward	18 November 1987 (aged 31)	35	Unattached
Alamanda Motuga ^{2}	Loose forward	11 September 1994 (aged 25)	1	(New Zealand) Manurewa RFC
Chris Vui	Loose forward	11 February 1993 (aged 26)	14	(England) Bristol Bears
Pele Cowley ^{1}	Scrum-half	16 April 1993 (aged 26)	12	(New Zealand) Ponsonby
Scott Malolua ^{1}	Scrum-half	11 June 1993 (aged 26)	1	(Australia) Queensland Reds
Melani Matavao	Scrum-half	19 November 1995 (aged 23)	9	Aana Chiefs
Dwayne Polataivao	Scrum-half	30 July 1990 (aged 29)	13	Unattached
AJ Alatimu	Fly-half	25 March 1993 (aged 26)	5	(Australia) Western Force
Tusi Pisi	Fly-half	18 June 1982 (aged 37)	38	(Japan) Toyota Industries Shuttles
UJ Seuteni	Fly-half	9 December 1993 (aged 25)	2	(France) Bordeaux-Bègles
Kieron Fonotia	Centre	2 February 1988 (aged 31)	9	(Wales) Scarlets
Rey Lee-Lo	Centre	28 February 1986 (aged 33)	25	(Wales) Cardiff Blues
Henry Taefu	Centre	2 April 1993 (aged 26)	3	(Australia) Western Force
Ed Fidow	Wing	11 September 1993 (aged 26)	8	(England) Worcester Warriors
Alapati Leiua	Wing	21 September 1988 (aged 30)	27	(England) Bristol Bears
Belgium Tuatagaloa	Wing	19 September 1989 (aged 30)	3	Unattached
Tim Nanai-Williams	Fullback	12 June 1989 (aged 30)	12	(France) Clermont Auvergne
Ahsee Tuala	Fullback	23 August 1989 (aged 30)	20	(England) Northampton Saints

=== Scotland ===
Scotland named an initial 42-man training squad on 7 May 2019. The final 31-man squad for the tournament was confirmed on 3 September.

^{1} On 23 September, Magnus Bradbury replaced Hamish Watson, after he suffered a knee injury in the team's opening match against Ireland.

^{2} On 24 September, Henry Pyrgos replaced Ali Price, after he suffered a foot injury in the team's opening match against Ireland.

Head coach: (Scotland) Gregor Townsend

Player	Position	Date of birth (age)	Caps	Club/province
Fraser Brown	Hooker	20 June 1989 (aged 30)	42	Glasgow Warriors
Stuart McInally (c)	Hooker	9 August 1990 (aged 29)	29	Edinburgh
George Turner	Hooker	8 October 1992 (aged 26)	8	Glasgow Warriors
Simon Berghan	Prop	7 December 1990 (aged 28)	22	Edinburgh
Allan Dell	Prop	16 March 1992 (aged 27)	25	(England) London Irish
Zander Fagerson	Prop	19 January 1996 (aged 23)	22	Glasgow Warriors
WP Nel	Prop	30 April 1986 (aged 33)	31	Edinburgh
Gordon Reid	Prop	4 March 1987 (aged 32)	37	Ayrshire Bulls
Scott Cummings	Lock	3 December 1996 (aged 22)	4	Glasgow Warriors
Grant Gilchrist	Lock	9 August 1990 (aged 29)	36	Edinburgh
Jonny Gray	Lock	14 March 1994 (aged 25)	52	Glasgow Warriors
Ben Toolis	Lock	31 March 1992 (aged 27)	21	Edinburgh
John Barclay	Back row	25 September 1986 (aged 32)	74	Edinburgh
Magnus Bradbury ^{1}	Back row	23 August 1995 (aged 24)	8	Edinburgh
Jamie Ritchie	Back row	16 August 1996 (aged 23)	12	Edinburgh
Blade Thomson	Back row	4 December 1990 (aged 28)	2	(Wales) Scarlets
Hamish Watson ^{1}	Back row	15 October 1991 (aged 27)	27	Edinburgh
Ryan Wilson	Back row	18 May 1989 (aged 30)	45	Glasgow Warriors
George Horne	Scrum-half	12 May 1995 (aged 24)	7	Glasgow Warriors
Greig Laidlaw	Scrum-half	12 October 1985 (aged 33)	73	(France) Clermont Auvergne
Ali Price ^{2}	Scrum-half	12 May 1993 (aged 26)	27	Glasgow Warriors
Henry Pyrgos ^{2}	Scrum-half	9 July 1989 (aged 30)	27	Edinburgh
Adam Hastings	Fly-half	5 October 1996 (aged 22)	14	Glasgow Warriors
Finn Russell	Fly-half	23 September 1992 (aged 26)	46	(France) Racing 92
Chris Harris	Centre	28 December 1990 (aged 28)	10	(England) Gloucester
Peter Horne	Centre	5 October 1989 (aged 29)	43	Glasgow Warriors
Sam Johnson	Centre	19 June 1993 (aged 26)	6	Glasgow Warriors
Duncan Taylor	Centre	5 September 1989 (aged 30)	23	(England) Saracens
Darcy Graham	Wing	21 June 1997 (aged 22)	7	Edinburgh
Sean Maitland	Wing	14 September 1988 (aged 31)	42	(England) Saracens
Tommy Seymour	Wing	1 July 1988 (aged 31)	52	Glasgow Warriors
Stuart Hogg	Fullback	24 June 1992 (aged 27)	69	(England) Exeter Chiefs
Blair Kinghorn	Fullback	18 January 1997 (aged 22)	15	Edinburgh

== Pool B ==
=== Canada ===
Canada named a 42-man training squad for the tournament on 20 August 2019. The final 31-man squad was named on 3 September 2019.

^{1} On 10 September, Justin Blanchet was replaced by Josh Larsen in the World Cup squad following an injury sustained in Canada's final warm-up match.

^{2} On 27 September, injured centres Nick Blevins and Ben LeSage were replaced in the squad by Giuseppe du Toit and Theo Sauder.

^{3} On 3 October, Kainoa Lloyd joined the squad as an injury replacement for Taylor Paris.

Head coach: (Wales) Kingsley Jones

Player	Position	Date of birth (age)	Caps	Club/province
Eric Howard	Hooker	5 September 1993 (aged 26)	23	(United States) New Orleans Gold
Benoît Piffero	Hooker	21 May 1987 (aged 32)	24	(France) Blagnac SCR
Andrew Quattrin	Hooker	29 August 1996 (aged 23)	3	Toronto Arrows
Hubert Buydens	Prop	4 January 1982 (aged 37)	55	(United States) New Orleans Gold
Jake Ilnicki	Prop	27 February 1992 (aged 27)	36	(United States) Seattle Seawolves
Cole Keith	Prop	7 May 1997 (aged 22)	14	Toronto Arrows
Djustice Sears-Duru	Prop	24 May 1994 (aged 25)	49	(United States) Seattle Seawolves
Matt Tierney	Prop	4 July 1996 (aged 23)	20	(France) Castres
Conor Keys	Lock	2 August 1995 (aged 24)	16	Unattached
Josh Larsen ^{1}	Lock	4 April 1994 (age 32)	12	(United States) New England Free Jacks
Evan Olmstead	Lock	21 February 1991 (aged 28)	31	Unattached
Mike Sheppard	Lock	20 December 1988 (aged 30)	8	Toronto Arrows
Tyler Ardron (c)	Back row	16 June 1991 (aged 28)	34	(New Zealand) Chiefs
Kyle Baillie	Back row	7 April 1991 (aged 28)	28	(United States) New Orleans Gold
Justin Blanchet ^{1}	Back row	25 August 1993 (aged 26)	6	Unattached
Luke Campbell	Back row	10 February 1992 (aged 27)	12	Toronto Arrows
Matt Heaton	Back row	9 February 1993 (aged 26)	25	(United States) Rugby ATL
Lucas Rumball	Back row	2 August 1995 (aged 24)	32	Toronto Arrows
Phil Mack	Scrum-half	18 August 1985 (aged 34)	57	(United States) Seattle Seawolves
Jamie Mackenzie	Scrum-half	28 February 1989 (aged 30)	19	Toronto Arrows
Gordon McRorie	Scrum-half	12 May 1988 (aged 31)	43	Calgary Hornets
Shane O'Leary	Fly-half	3 December 1993 (aged 25)	13	(England) Nottingham
Pat Parfrey	Fly-half	1 November 1991 (aged 27)	30	Toronto Arrows
Nick Blevins ^{2}	Centre	11 November 1988 (aged 30)	62	Calgary Hornets
Giuseppe du Toit ^{2}	Centre	29 July 1995 (age 31)	13	Toronto Arrows
Ciaran Hearn	Centre	30 December 1985 (aged 33)	70	Unattached
Ben LeSage ^{2}	Centre	24 November 1995 (aged 23)	15	Calgary Canucks
Conor Trainor	Centre	12 May 1989 (aged 30)	34	(France) USO Nevers
Jeff Hassler	Wing	21 August 1991 (aged 28)	24	(United States) Seattle Seawolves
Kainoa Lloyd ^{3}	Wing	21 May 1994 (age 32)	11	Toronto Arrows
Taylor Paris ^{3}	Wing	6 October 1992 (aged 26)	27	(France) Castres
D. T. H. van der Merwe	Wing	28 April 1986 (aged 33)	58	(Scotland) Glasgow Warriors
Andrew Coe	Fullback	8 April 1996 (aged 23)	11	Markham Irish
Peter Nelson	Fullback	5 October 1992 (aged 26)	4	Unattached
Theo Sauder ^{2}	Fullback	2 April 1996 (age 30)	8	Toronto Arrows

=== Italy ===
Italy named their 31-man squad for the tournament on 18 August 2019.

^{1} On 8 October, Giosuè Zilocchi and Danilo Fischetti joined the Italian squad following injuries to Simone Ferrari and Marco Riccioni.

Head coach: (Ireland) Conor O'Shea

Player	Position	Date of birth (age)	Caps	Club/province
Luca Bigi	Hooker	19 April 1991 (aged 28)	21	Zebre
Oliviero Fabiani	Hooker	3 July 1990 (aged 29)	9	Zebre
Leonardo Ghiraldini	Hooker	26 December 1984 (aged 34)	104	Unattached
Simone Ferrari ^{1}	Prop	28 March 1994 (aged 25)	26	Benetton
Danilo Fischetti ^{1}	Prop	26 January 1998 (aged 21)	0	Zebre
Andrea Lovotti	Prop	28 July 1989 (aged 30)	38	Zebre
Tiziano Pasquali	Prop	14 July 1994 (aged 25)	20	Benetton
Nicola Quaglio	Prop	9 March 1991 (aged 28)	11	Benetton
Marco Riccioni ^{1}	Prop	19 October 1997 (aged 21)	4	Benetton
Federico Zani	Prop	9 April 1989 (aged 30)	11	Benetton
Giosuè Zilocchi ^{1}	Prop	15 January 1997 (aged 22)	2	Zebre
Dean Budd	Lock	31 July 1986 (aged 33)	23	Benetton
Federico Ruzza	Lock	4 August 1994 (aged 25)	15	Benetton
Dave Sisi	Lock	5 February 1993 (aged 26)	7	Zebre
Alessandro Zanni	Lock	31 January 1984 (aged 35)	115	Benetton
Maxime Mbanda	Back row	10 April 1993 (aged 26)	18	Zebre
Sebastian Negri	Back row	30 June 1994 (aged 25)	20	Benetton
Sergio Parisse (c)	Back row	12 September 1983 (aged 36)	140	(France) Toulon
Jake Polledri	Back row	8 November 1995 (aged 23)	10	(England) Gloucester
Braam Steyn	Back row	2 May 1992 (aged 27)	33	Benetton
Callum Braley	Scrum-half	20 March 1994 (aged 25)	3	(England) Gloucester
Guglielmo Palazzani	Scrum-half	11 April 1991 (aged 28)	34	Zebre
Tito Tebaldi	Scrum-half	23 September 1987 (aged 31)	34	Benetton
Tommaso Allan	Fly-half	26 April 1993 (aged 26)	51	Benetton
Carlo Canna	Fly-half	25 August 1992 (aged 27)	36	Zebre
Tommaso Benvenuti	Centre	12 December 1990 (aged 28)	59	Benetton
Michele Campagnaro	Centre	13 March 1993 (aged 26)	44	(England) Harlequins
Luca Morisi	Centre	22 February 1991 (aged 28)	27	Benetton
Mattia Bellini	Wing	8 February 1994 (aged 25)	20	Zebre
Giulio Bisegni	Wing	4 April 1992 (aged 27)	13	Zebre
Matteo Minozzi	Fullback	4 June 1996 (aged 23)	13	(England) Wasps
Jayden Hayward	Fullback	11 February 1987 (aged 32)	20	Benetton
Edoardo Padovani	Fullback	15 May 1993 (aged 26)	23	Zebre

=== Namibia ===
Namibia named a 31-man squad for the tournament on 2 September.

Head coach: (Wales) Phil Davies

Player	Position	Date of birth (age)	Caps	Club/province
Obert Nortjé	Hooker	17 April 1997 (aged 22)	15	Welwitschias
Louis van der Westhuizen	Hooker	25 February 1995 (aged 24)	19	Welwitschias
Torsten van Jaarsveld	Hooker	30 June 1987 (aged 32)	14	(France) Bayonne
Aranos Coetzee	Prop	14 May 1988 (aged 31)	21	(South Africa) Free State Cheetahs
AJ de Klerk	Prop	9 December 1987 (aged 31)	28	Welwitschias
André Rademeyer	Prop	24 June 1998 (aged 21)	3	Welwitschias
Des Sethie	Prop	9 December 1992 (aged 26)	12	Welwitschias
Nelius Theron	Prop	29 January 1997 (aged 22)	5	(South Africa) Leopards
Johan Retief	Lock	10 October 1995 (aged 23)	7	(South Africa) Leopards
Tjiuee Uanivi	Lock	31 December 1990 (aged 28)	30	(France) Massy
PJ van Lill	Lock	4 December 1983 (aged 35)	49	(France) Bayonne
Adriaan Booysen	Loose forward	17 May 1996 (aged 23)	5	Welwitschias
Wian Conradie	Loose forward	14 October 1994 (aged 24)	17	Welwitschias
Thomasau Forbes	Loose forward	12 October 1988 (aged 30)	17	Welwitschias
Prince ǃGaoseb	Loose forward	7 July 1998 (aged 21)	2	Welwitschias
Max Katjijeko	Loose forward	8 April 1995 (aged 24)	13	Welwitschias
Rohan Kitshoff	Loose forward	13 September 1985 (aged 34)	44	Welwitschias
Janco Venter	Loose forward	19 September 1994 (aged 25)	25	Jersey Reds
Eugene Jantjies	Scrum-half	10 August 1986 (aged 33)	67	Welwitschias
Damian Stevens	Scrum-half	2 June 1995 (aged 24)	25	(South Africa) Boland Cavaliers
TC Kisting	Fly-half	13 January 1994 (aged 25)	8	(Romania) Baia Mare
Cliven Loubser	Fly-half	24 February 1997 (aged 22)	15	Welwitschias
Darryl de la Harpe	Centre	2 October 1986 (aged 32)	48	Welwitschias
Johan Deysel (c)	Centre	26 September 1991 (aged 27)	24	(France) Colomiers
Justin Newman	Centre	17 February 1995 (aged 24)	14	Welwitschias
Janry du Toit	Centre	26 August 1996 (aged 23)	2	Welwitschias
JC Greyling	Wing	21 June 1991 (aged 28)	32	Welwitschias
Lesley Klim	Wing	16 January 1995 (aged 24)	11	(Wales) Ospreys
PJ Walters	Wing	23 April 1993 (aged 26)	0	Welwitschias
Chad Plato	Fullback	21 April 1998 (aged 21)	2	Welwitschias
Johann Tromp	Fullback	23 December 1990 (aged 28)	40	Welwitschias

=== New Zealand ===
New Zealand named their 31-man squad on 28 August 2019.

^{1} On 13 September 2019, Shannon Frizell was named as replacement for Luke Jacobson, who was ruled out of the competition due to delayed onset of concussion.

Head coach: (New Zealand) Steve Hansen

Player	Position	Date of birth (age)	Caps	Club/province
Dane Coles	Hooker	10 December 1986 (aged 32)	64	Hurricanes
Liam Coltman	Hooker	25 January 1990 (aged 29)	6	Highlanders
Codie Taylor	Hooker	31 March 1991 (aged 28)	45	Crusaders
Nepo Laulala	Prop	6 November 1991 (aged 27)	20	Chiefs
Joe Moody	Prop	18 September 1988 (aged 31)	41	Crusaders
Atu Moli	Prop	12 June 1995 (aged 24)	2	Chiefs
Angus Ta'avao	Prop	22 March 1990 (aged 29)	8	Chiefs
Ofa Tu'ungafasi	Prop	19 April 1992 (aged 27)	30	Blues
Scott Barrett	Lock	20 November 1993 (aged 25)	31	Crusaders
Brodie Retallick	Lock	31 May 1991 (aged 28)	77	Chiefs
Patrick Tuipulotu	Lock	23 January 1993 (aged 26)	25	Blues
Sam Whitelock	Lock	12 October 1988 (aged 30)	112	Crusaders
Sam Cane	Loose forward	13 January 1992 (aged 27)	63	Chiefs
Shannon Frizell ^{1}	Loose forward	11 February 1994 (aged 25)	5	Highlanders
Luke Jacobson ^{1}	Loose forward	20 April 1997 (aged 22)	2	Chiefs
Kieran Read (c)	Loose forward	26 October 1985 (aged 33)	122	Crusaders
Ardie Savea	Loose forward	14 October 1993 (aged 25)	39	Hurricanes
Matt Todd	Loose forward	24 March 1988 (aged 31)	21	Crusaders
TJ Perenara	Scrum-half	23 January 1992 (aged 27)	59	Hurricanes
Aaron Smith	Scrum-half	21 November 1988 (aged 30)	87	Highlanders
Brad Weber	Scrum-half	17 January 1991 (aged 28)	2	Chiefs
Beauden Barrett	Fly-half	27 May 1991 (aged 28)	78	Blues
Richie Mo'unga	Fly-half	25 May 1994 (aged 25)	12	Crusaders
Ryan Crotty	Centre	23 September 1988 (aged 30)	45	Crusaders
Jack Goodhue	Centre	13 June 1995 (aged 24)	9	Crusaders
Anton Lienert-Brown	Centre	15 April 1995 (aged 24)	38	Chiefs
Sonny Bill Williams	Centre	3 August 1985 (aged 34)	53	Blues
George Bridge	Wing	1 April 1995 (aged 24)	5	Crusaders
Rieko Ioane	Wing	18 March 1997 (aged 22)	26	Blues
Sevu Reece	Wing	13 February 1997 (aged 22)	3	Crusaders
Jordie Barrett	Fullback	17 February 1997 (aged 22)	12	Hurricanes
Ben Smith	Fullback	1 June 1986 (aged 33)	80	Highlanders

=== South Africa ===
South Africa named their 31-man squad for the tournament on 26 August 2019.

^{1} On 23 September, Thomas du Toit replaced Trevor Nyakane, after he injured his calf in the team's opening match against New Zealand.

^{2} On 1 October, Damian Willemse replaced Jesse Kriel, after he was injured during the team's opening match against New Zealand.

Head coach: (South Africa) Rassie Erasmus

Player	Position	Date of birth (age)	Caps	Club/province
Schalk Brits	Hooker	16 May 1981 (aged 38)	13	Bulls
Malcolm Marx	Hooker	13 July 1994 (aged 25)	27	Lions
Bongi Mbonambi	Hooker	7 January 1991 (aged 28)	30	Stormers
Thomas du Toit ^{1}	Prop	5 May 1995 (aged 24)	10	(France) Toulouse
Steven Kitshoff	Prop	10 February 1992 (aged 27)	40	Stormers
Vincent Koch	Prop	13 March 1990 (aged 29)	15	(England) Saracens
Frans Malherbe	Prop	14 March 1991 (aged 28)	32	Stormers
Tendai Mtawarira	Prop	1 August 1985 (aged 34)	111	Sharks
Trevor Nyakane ^{1}	Prop	4 May 1989 (aged 30)	41	Bulls
Lood de Jager	Lock	17 December 1992 (aged 26)	40	Bulls
Eben Etzebeth	Lock	29 October 1991 (aged 27)	79	Stormers
Franco Mostert	Lock	27 November 1990 (aged 28)	32	(England) Gloucester
RG Snyman	Lock	29 January 1995 (aged 24)	16	Bulls
Pieter-Steph du Toit	Loose forward	20 August 1992 (aged 27)	50	Stormers
Siya Kolisi (c)	Loose forward	16 June 1991 (aged 28)	43	Stormers
Francois Louw	Loose forward	15 June 1985 (aged 34)	69	(England) Bath
Kwagga Smith	Loose forward	11 June 1993 (aged 26)	4	Lions
Duane Vermeulen	Loose forward	3 July 1986 (aged 33)	49	Bulls
Faf de Klerk	Scrum-half	19 October 1991 (aged 27)	25	(England) Sale Sharks
Herschel Jantjies	Scrum-half	22 April 1996 (aged 23)	4	Stormers
Cobus Reinach	Scrum-half	7 February 1990 (aged 29)	12	(England) Northampton Saints
Elton Jantjies	Fly-half	1 August 1990 (aged 29)	35	Lions
Handré Pollard	Fly-half	11 March 1994 (aged 25)	42	Bulls
Damian Willemse ^{2}	Fly-half	7 May 1998 (aged 21)	5	Stormers
Lukhanyo Am	Centre	28 November 1993 (aged 25)	9	Sharks
Damian de Allende	Centre	25 November 1991 (aged 27)	40	Stormers
Jesse Kriel ^{2}	Centre	15 February 1994 (aged 25)	45	Bulls
François Steyn	Centre	14 May 1987 (aged 32)	61	(France) Montpellier
Cheslin Kolbe	Wing	28 October 1993 (aged 25)	10	(France) Toulouse
Makazole Mapimpi	Wing	26 July 1990 (aged 29)	8	Sharks
S'busiso Nkosi	Wing	21 January 1996 (aged 23)	8	Sharks
Warrick Gelant	Fullback	20 May 1995 (aged 24)	7	Bulls
Willie le Roux	Fullback	18 August 1989 (aged 30)	56	(Japan) Toyota Verblitz

== Pool C ==
=== Argentina ===
Argentina named their 31-man squad for the tournament on 19 August 2019.

^{1} On 6 October, Gonzalo Bertranou replaced Tomás Cubelli after he was injured in Argentina's game against England.

Head coach: (Argentina) Mario Ledesma

Player	Position	Date of birth (age)	Caps	Club/province
Agustín Creevy	Hooker	15 March 1985 (aged 34)	85	Jaguares
Julián Montoya	Hooker	29 October 1993 (aged 25)	55	Jaguares
Santiago Socino	Hooker	5 July 1992 (aged 27)	2	Jaguares
Nahuel Tetaz Chaparro	Prop	11 June 1989 (aged 30)	54	Jaguares
Juan Figallo	Prop	25 March 1988 (aged 31)	30	(England) Saracens
Santiago Medrano	Prop	6 May 1996 (aged 23)	14	Jaguares
Enrique Pieretto	Prop	15 December 1994 (aged 24)	23	Jaguares
Mayco Vivas	Prop	2 June 1998 (aged 21)	4	Jaguares
Matías Alemanno	Lock	5 December 1991 (aged 27)	57	Jaguares
Tomás Lavanini	Lock	22 January 1993 (aged 26)	53	Jaguares
Guido Petti	Lock	17 November 1994 (aged 24)	49	Jaguares
Rodrigo Bruni	Back row	3 September 1993 (aged 26)	3	Jaguares
Marcos Kremer	Back row	30 July 1997 (aged 22)	24	Jaguares
Juan Manuel Leguizamón	Back row	6 June 1983 (aged 36)	86	Jaguares
Tomás Lezana	Back row	16 February 1994 (aged 25)	34	Jaguares
Pablo Matera (c)	Back row	8 July 1993 (aged 26)	62	Jaguares
Javier Ortega Desio	Back row	14 June 1990 (aged 29)	54	Jaguares
Gonzalo Bertranou ^{1}	Scrum-half	31 December 1993 (aged 25)	21	Jaguares
Tomás Cubelli ^{1}	Scrum-half	12 June 1989 (aged 30)	72	Jaguares
Felipe Ezcurra	Scrum-half	15 April 1993 (aged 26)	5	Hindú
Nicolás Sánchez	Fly-half	26 October 1988 (aged 30)	77	(France) Stade Français
Benjamín Urdapilleta	Fly-half	11 March 1986 (aged 33)	12	(France) Castres
Santiago Carreras	Fly-half	30 March 1998 (aged 21)	1	Jaguares
Jerónimo de la Fuente	Centre	24 February 1991 (aged 28)	50	Jaguares
Juan Cruz Mallia	Centre	11 September 1996 (aged 23)	4	Jaguares
Lucas Mensa	Centre	24 May 1996 (aged 23)	1	Pucará
Matías Moroni	Centre	29 March 1991 (aged 28)	43	Jaguares
Matías Orlando	Centre	14 November 1991 (aged 27)	41	Jaguares
Emiliano Boffelli	Wing	16 January 1995 (aged 24)	25	Jaguares
Bautista Delguy	Wing	22 April 1997 (aged 22)	11	Jaguares
Ramiro Moyano	Wing	28 May 1990 (aged 29)	34	Jaguares
Joaquín Tuculet	Fullback	8 August 1989 (aged 30)	55	Jaguares

=== England ===
On 12 August, England became the first team to announce their 31-man squad for the tournament.

^{1} Ben Spencer was called up on 27 October as an injury replacement for Willi Heinz.

Head coach: (Australia) Eddie Jones

Player	Position	Date of birth (age)	Caps	Club/province
Luke Cowan-Dickie	Hooker	20 June 1993 (aged 26)	15	Exeter Chiefs
Jamie George	Hooker	20 October 1990 (aged 28)	40	Saracens
Jack Singleton	Hooker	14 May 1996 (aged 23)	2	Saracens
Dan Cole	Prop	9 May 1987 (aged 32)	89	Leicester Tigers
Ellis Genge	Prop	16 February 1995 (aged 24)	12	Leicester Tigers
Joe Marler	Prop	7 July 1990 (aged 29)	62	Harlequins
Kyle Sinckler	Prop	30 March 1993 (aged 26)	25	Harlequins
Mako Vunipola	Prop	14 January 1991 (aged 28)	54	Saracens
Maro Itoje	Lock	28 October 1994 (aged 24)	29	Saracens
George Kruis	Lock	22 February 1990 (aged 29)	35	Saracens
Joe Launchbury	Lock	12 April 1991 (aged 28)	61	Wasps
Courtney Lawes	Lock	23 February 1989 (aged 30)	75	Northampton Saints
Tom Curry	Back row	15 June 1998 (aged 21)	13	Sale Sharks
Lewis Ludlam	Back row	8 December 1995 (aged 23)	2	Northampton Saints
Sam Underhill	Back row	22 July 1996 (aged 23)	10	Bath
Mark Wilson	Back row	6 October 1989 (aged 29)	15	Sale Sharks
Billy Vunipola	Back row	3 November 1992 (aged 26)	45	Saracens
Willi Heinz ^{1}	Scrum-half	24 November 1986 (aged 32)	4	Gloucester
Ben Spencer ^{1}	Scrum-half	31 July 1992 (aged 27)	3	Saracens
Ben Youngs	Scrum-half	5 September 1989 (aged 30)	89	Leicester Tigers
Owen Farrell (c)	Fly-half	24 September 1991 (aged 27)	73	Saracens
George Ford	Fly-half	16 March 1993 (aged 26)	59	Leicester Tigers
Piers Francis	Centre	20 June 1990 (aged 29)	8	Northampton Saints
Jonathan Joseph	Centre	21 May 1991 (aged 28)	42	Bath
Henry Slade	Centre	19 March 1993 (aged 26)	22	Exeter Chiefs
Manu Tuilagi	Centre	18 May 1991 (aged 28)	35	Leicester Tigers
Joe Cokanasiga	Wing	15 November 1997 (aged 21)	8	Bath
Jonny May	Wing	1 April 1990 (aged 29)	47	Leicester Tigers
Ruaridh McConnochie	Wing	23 October 1991 (aged 27)	1	Bath
Jack Nowell	Wing	11 April 1993 (aged 26)	33	Exeter Chiefs
Anthony Watson	Wing	26 February 1994 (aged 25)	36	Bath
Elliot Daly	Fullback	8 October 1992 (aged 26)	33	Saracens

=== France ===
On 18 June 2019, head coach Jacques Brunel named a 37-man squad for the 2019 Rugby World Cup warm-up matches. On 10 July 2019, Paul Willemse had to withdraw from the team due to injury; he was replaced by Romain Taofifénua. On 20 July 2019, Cyril Baille was called up to replace the injured Étienne Falgoux.

France named their final 31-man squad for the tournament on 2 September 2019.

^{1} On 22 September, Wesley Fofana withdrew from the squad due to injury, and was replaced by Pierre-Louis Barassi.

^{2} On 29 September, Cedate Gomes Sa was called up to replace the injured Demba Bamba.

^{3} On 4 October, Christopher Tolofua was called up to replace the injured Peato Mauvaka.

^{4} On 4 October, Vincent Rattez was called up to replace the injured Thomas Ramos.

Head coach: (France) Jacques Brunel

Player	Position	Date of birth (age)	Caps	Club/province
Camille Chat	Hooker	18 December 1995 (aged 23)	22	Racing 92
Guilhem Guirado (c)	Hooker	17 June 1986 (aged 33)	70	Montpellier
Peato Mauvaka ^{3}	Hooker	10 January 1997 (aged 22)	1	Toulouse
Christopher Tolofua ^{3}	Hooker	31 December 1993 (age 32)	8	Toulon
Cyril Baille	Prop	15 September 1993 (aged 26)	13	Toulouse
Demba Bamba ^{2}	Prop	17 March 1998 (aged 21)	6	Lyon
Cedate Gomes Sa ^{2}	Prop	7 August 1993 (age 33)	9	Racing 92
Jefferson Poirot	Prop	1 November 1992 (aged 26)	29	Bordeaux Bègles
Emerick Setiano	Prop	19 July 1996 (aged 23)	3	Toulon
Rabah Slimani	Prop	18 October 1989 (aged 29)	53	Clermont Auvergne
Paul Gabrillagues	Lock	3 June 1993 (aged 26)	13	Stade Français
Sébastien Vahaamahina	Lock	21 October 1991 (aged 27)	42	Clermont Auvergne
Gregory Alldritt	Back row	23 March 1997 (aged 22)	7	La Rochelle
Yacouba Camara	Back row	2 June 1994 (aged 25)	15	Montpellier
Arthur Iturria	Back row	13 May 1994 (aged 25)	13	Clermont Auvergne
Wenceslas Lauret	Back row	30 March 1988 (aged 31)	24	Racing 92
Bernard Le Roux	Back row	4 June 1989 (aged 30)	33	Racing 92
Charles Ollivon	Back row	11 May 1993 (aged 26)	8	Toulon
Louis Picamoles	Back row	5 February 1986 (aged 33)	79	Montpellier
Antoine Dupont	Scrum-half	15 November 1996 (aged 22)	17	Toulouse
Maxime Machenaud	Scrum-half	30 December 1988 (aged 30)	36	Racing 92
Baptiste Serin	Scrum-half	20 June 1994 (aged 25)	30	Toulon
Camille Lopez	Fly-half	3 April 1989 (aged 30)	24	Clermont Auvergne
Romain Ntamack	Fly-half	1 May 1999 (aged 20)	8	Toulouse
Pierre-Louis Barassi ^{1}	Centre	22 April 1998 (aged 21)	0	Lyon
Gaël Fickou	Centre	26 March 1994 (aged 25)	48	Stade Français
Wesley Fofana ^{1}	Centre	20 January 1988 (aged 31)	48	Clermont Auvergne
Virimi Vakatawa	Centre	1 May 1992 (aged 27)	18	Racing 92
Sofiane Guitoune	Wing	27 March 1989 (aged 30)	7	Toulouse
Yoann Huget	Wing	2 June 1987 (aged 32)	59	Toulouse
Damian Penaud	Wing	25 September 1996 (aged 22)	13	Clermont Auvergne
Alivereti Raka	Wing	9 December 1994 (aged 24)	2	Clermont Auvergne
Vincent Rattez ^{4}	Wing	24 March 1992 (age 34)	2	La Rochelle
Maxime Médard	Fullback	16 November 1986 (aged 32)	59	Toulouse
Thomas Ramos ^{4}	Fullback	23 July 1995 (aged 24)	7	Toulouse

=== Tonga ===
Tonga announced their 31-man squad for the tournament on 1 September 2019.

^{1} On 24 September, Kurt Morath and Nafi Tuitavake were ruled out for the remainder of the tournament following injuries sustained in Tonga's opening match against England. Latiume Fosita and Fetuli Paea replaced them.

Head coach: (Australia) Toutai Kefu

Player	Position	Date of birth (age)	Caps	Club/province
Siua Maile	Hooker	18 February 1997 (aged 22)	1	(New Zealand) Shirley Rugby Club
Paul Ngauamo	Hooker	19 February 1990 (aged 29)	19	(France) Agen
Sosefo Sakalia	Hooker	14 December 1991 (aged 27)	10	(Singapore) Asia Pacific Dragons
Maʻafu Fia	Prop	22 November 1989 (aged 29)	6	(Wales) Ospreys
Vunipola Fifita	Prop	18 February 1996 (aged 23)	2	(Australia) Brumbies
Siegfried Fisi'ihoi	Prop	8 June 1987 (aged 32)	9	(France) Pau
Siua Halanukonuka	Prop	9 August 1986 (aged 33)	11	(Scotland) Glasgow Warriors
Latu Talakai	Prop	26 December 1989 (aged 29)	6	(Australia) Eastwood
Ben Tameifuna	Prop	30 August 1991 (aged 28)	11	(France) Racing 92
Leva Fifita	Lock	29 July 1989 (aged 30)	15	(France) Grenoble
Sam Lousi	Lock	20 July 1991 (aged 28)	4	(New Zealand) Hurricanes
Steve Mafi	Lock	9 December 1989 (aged 29)	32	(England) London Irish
Daniel Faleafa	Loose forward	13 February 1989 (aged 30)	22	(United States) Austin Elite
Sione Kalamafoni	Loose forward	18 May 1988 (aged 31)	33	(England) Leicester Tigers
Zane Kapeli	Loose forward	28 September 1992 (aged 26)	6	(New Zealand) Bay of Plenty
Fotu Lokotui	Loose forward	19 March 1992 (aged 27)	9	Kagifa Samoa
Nasi Manu	Loose forward	15 August 1988 (aged 31)	3	(Italy) Benetton
Maama Vaipulu	Loose forward	21 July 1989 (aged 30)	8	(France) Castres
Samisoni Fisilau	Half-back	29 November 1987 (aged 31)	19	(New Zealand) Auckland Marist
Leon Fukofuka	Half-back	8 September 1994 (aged 25)	7	Kagifa Samoa
Sonatane Takulua	Half-back	11 January 1991 (aged 28)	34	(England) Newcastle Falcons
James Faiva	First five-eighth	13 June 1994 (aged 25)	5	(Spain) El Salvador
Latiume Fosita ^{1}	First five-eighth	25 July 1992 (aged 27)	29	Kagifa Samoa
Kurt Morath^{1}	First five-eighth	13 November 1984 (aged 34)	37	(England) Doncaster Knights
Mali Hingano	Centre	27 January 1992 (aged 27)	4	(France) Bayonne
Siale Piutau (c)	Centre	13 October 1985 (aged 33)	39	(England) Bristol Bears
Nafi Tuitavake ^{1}	Centre	21 January 1989 (aged 30)	13	Unattached
Viliami Lolohea	Wing	4 July 1993 (aged 26)	9	(New Zealand) Papatoetoe
Fetuli Paea ^{1}	Wing	16 August 1994 (aged 25)	2	(New Zealand) Tasman
Atieli Pakalani	Wing	2 August 1989 (aged 30)	10	(Australia) Eastwood
Cooper Vuna	Wing	5 July 1987 (aged 32)	13	(England) Newcastle Falcons
David Halaifonua	Fullback	5 July 1987 (aged 32)	33	(England) Coventry
Telusa Veainu	Fullback	26 December 1990 (aged 28)	9	(England) Leicester Tigers

=== United States ===
On 13 June, the United States named a 50-man extended training squad ahead of the 2019 World Rugby Pacific Nations Cup in preparation for the 2019 Rugby World Cup. On 19 June, Samu Manoa retired from international rugby and withdrew from the squad.

On 8 September, USA were the last side to name their 31-man squad.

^{1} On 1 October, David Ainu'u was ruled out for the remainder of the tournament following an injury sustained in the United States' opening match against England, Chance Wenglewski replaced him.

Head coach: (South Africa) Gary Gold

Player	Position	Date of birth (age)	Caps	Club/province
Dylan Fawsitt	Hooker	24 July 1990 (aged 29)	12	Rugby United New York
James Hilterbrand	Hooker	21 May 1989 (aged 30)	19	(Australia) Manly
Joe Taufete'e	Hooker	4 October 1992 (aged 26)	23	(England) Worcester Warriors
David Ainuʻu^{1}	Prop	20 November 1999 (aged 19)	8	(France) Toulouse
Eric Fry	Prop	14 September 1987 (aged 32)	45	(France) RC Vannes
Olive Kilifi	Prop	28 September 1986 (aged 32)	27	Seattle Seawolves
Titi Lamositele	Prop	11 February 1995 (aged 24)	28	(England) Saracens
Paul Mullen	Prop	16 November 1991 (aged 27)	14	Unattached
Chance Wenglewski^{1}	Prop	9 April 1997 (aged 22)	6	Rugby United New York
Nate Brakeley	Lock	31 August 1989 (aged 30)	21	Rugby United New York
Nick Civetta	Lock	5 November 1989 (aged 29)	23	Unattached
Ben Landry	Lock	26 March 1991 (aged 28)	22	(England) Ealing Trailfinders
Greg Peterson	Lock	26 March 1991 (aged 28)	26	(England) Newcastle Falcons
Malon Al-Jiboori	Flanker	1 August 1997 (aged 22)	5	Unattached
Hanco Germishuys	Flanker	24 August 1996 (aged 23)	17	Glendale Raptors
Tony Lamborn	Flanker	31 July 1994 (aged 25)	19	(Australia) Melbourne Rebels
Ben Pinkelman	Flanker	13 June 1994 (aged 25)	2	USA Sevens
John Quill	Flanker	10 March 1990 (aged 29)	36	Rugby United New York
Cam Dolan	Number 8	7 March 1990 (aged 29)	47	New Orleans Gold
Nate Augspurger	Scrum-half	31 January 1990 (aged 29)	24	San Diego Legion
Shaun Davies	Scrum-half	20 June 1989 (aged 30)	25	Glendale Raptors
Ruben de Haas	Scrum-half	9 October 1998 (aged 20)	13	(South Africa) Cheetahs
AJ MacGinty	Fly-half	26 February 1990 (aged 29)	24	(England) Sale Sharks
Will Magie	Fly-half	23 February 1992 (aged 27)	25	Unattached
Bryce Campbell	Centre	21 September 1994 (aged 24)	28	(England) London Irish
Paul Lasike	Centre	18 June 1990 (aged 29)	16	(England) Harlequins
Thretton Palamo	Centre	22 September 1988 (aged 30)	18	Houston Sabercats
Marcel Brache	Wing	15 October 1987 (aged 31)	19	(Australia) Western Force
Martin Iosefo	Wing	13 January 1990 (aged 29)	6	USA Sevens
Mike Te'o	Wing	23 July 1993 (aged 26)	24	San Diego Legion
Blaine Scully (c)	Wing	29 February 1988 (aged 31)	50	Unattached
Will Hooley	Fullback	28 October 1993 (aged 25)	12	(England) Bedford Blues

== Pool D ==
=== Australia ===
Australia named their 31-man squad for the tournament on 23 August 2019.

Head coach: (Australia) Michael Cheika

Player	Position	Date of birth (age)	Caps	Club/province
Folau Fainga'a	Hooker	5 May 1995 (aged 24)	11	Brumbies
Tolu Latu	Hooker	23 February 1993 (aged 26)	15	Waratahs
Jordan Uelese	Hooker	24 January 1997 (aged 22)	4	Melbourne Rebels
Allan Alaalatoa	Prop	28 January 1994 (aged 25)	33	Brumbies
Sekope Kepu	Prop	5 February 1986 (aged 33)	106	Waratahs
Scott Sio	Prop	16 October 1991 (aged 27)	59	Brumbies
James Slipper	Prop	6 June 1989 (aged 30)	91	Brumbies
Taniela Tupou	Prop	10 May 1996 (aged 23)	16	Queensland Reds
Rory Arnold	Lock	1 July 1990 (aged 29)	22	Brumbies
Adam Coleman	Lock	7 October 1991 (aged 27)	34	Melbourne Rebels
Izack Rodda	Lock	20 August 1996 (aged 23)	21	Queensland Reds
Rob Simmons	Lock	19 April 1989 (aged 30)	98	Waratahs
Jack Dempsey	Back row	12 April 1994 (aged 25)	11	Waratahs
Michael Hooper (c)	Back row	29 October 1991 (aged 27)	95	Waratahs
Isi Naisarani	Back row	14 February 1995 (aged 24)	4	Melbourne Rebels
David Pocock	Back row	23 April 1988 (aged 31)	78	Brumbies
Lukhan Salakaia-Loto	Back row	19 September 1996 (aged 23)	16	Queensland Reds
Will Genia	Scrum-half	17 January 1988 (aged 31)	105	Melbourne Rebels
Nic White	Scrum-half	13 June 1990 (aged 29)	26	(England) Exeter Chiefs
Bernard Foley	Fly-half	8 September 1989 (aged 30)	70	Waratahs
Christian Lealiifano	Fly-half	24 September 1987 (aged 31)	22	Brumbies
Samu Kerevi	Centre	27 September 1993 (aged 25)	29	Queensland Reds
Tevita Kuridrani	Centre	31 March 1991 (aged 28)	60	Brumbies
James O'Connor	Centre	5 July 1990 (aged 29)	48	Queensland Reds
Matt To'omua	Centre	2 January 1990 (aged 29)	47	Melbourne Rebels
Adam Ashley-Cooper	Wing	27 March 1984 (aged 35)	119	Waratahs
Reece Hodge	Wing	26 August 1994 (aged 25)	37	Melbourne Rebels
Marika Koroibete	Wing	26 July 1992 (aged 27)	24	Melbourne Rebels
Jordan Petaia	Wing	14 March 2000 (aged 19)	0	Queensland Reds
Kurtley Beale	Fullback	6 January 1989 (aged 30)	87	Waratahs
Dane Haylett-Petty	Fullback	18 June 1989 (aged 30)	33	Melbourne Rebels

=== Fiji ===
Fiji named an initial 32-man squad for the tournament on 16 August 2019, before reducing it to the final 31 on 3 September.

^{1} On 5 September, prop Lee Roy Atalifo replaced Kalivati Tawake, who suffered a knee injury.

Head coach: (New Zealand) John McKee

Player	Position	Date of birth (age)	Caps	Club/province
Mesu Dolokoto	Hooker	21 January 1995 (aged 24)	6	(Scotland) Glasgow Warriors
Sam Matavesi	Hooker	13 January 1992 (aged 27)	8	(England) Cornish Pirates
Ratu Veremalua Vugakoto	Hooker	29 December 1997 (aged 21)	6	Fijian Latui
Lee Roy Atalifo ^{1}	Prop	10 May 1988 (aged 31)	10	(England) Jersey Reds
Campese Ma'afu	Prop	19 December 1984 (aged 34)	57	Unattached
Eroni Mawi	Prop	2 June 1996 (aged 23)	9	Fijian Latui
Peni Ravai	Prop	16 June 1990 (aged 29)	29	(France) Bordeaux Bègles
Manasa Saulo	Prop	6 April 1989 (aged 30)	42	Unattached
Kalivati Tawake ^{1}	Prop	16 November 1988 (aged 30)	13	(France) Biarritz
Tevita Cavubati	Lock	12 August 1987 (aged 32)	26	(England) Harlequins
Leone Nakarawa	Lock	2 April 1988 (aged 31)	57	(France) Racing 92
Api Ratuniyarawa	Lock	11 July 1986 (aged 33)	30	(England) Northampton Saints
Tevita Ratuva	Lock	8 May 1995 (aged 24)	3	(France) Bordeaux Bègles
Semi Kunatani	Back row	27 October 1990 (aged 28)	10	(England) Harlequins
Viliame Mata	Back row	22 October 1991 (aged 27)	13	(Scotland) Edinburgh
Mosese Voka	Back row	7 June 1985 (aged 34)	7	Fijian Latui
Dominiko Waqaniburotu (c)	Back row	20 April 1986 (aged 33)	45	(France) Pau
Peceli Yato	Back row	17 January 1993 (aged 26)	17	(France) Clermont Auvergne
Frank Lomani	Scrum-half	18 April 1996 (aged 23)	11	Fijian Latui
Nikola Matawalu	Scrum-half	8 March 1989 (aged 30)	36	(Scotland) Glasgow Warriors
Henry Seniloli	Scrum-half	15 June 1989 (aged 30)	26	Unattached
Alivereti Veitokani	Fly-half	2 November 1992 (aged 26)	8	(England) London Irish
Ben Volavola	Fly-half	13 January 1991 (aged 28)	31	(France) Racing 92
Levani Botia	Centre	14 March 1989 (aged 30)	14	(France) La Rochelle
Josh Matavesi	Centre	5 October 1990 (aged 28)	21	(England) Newcastle Falcons
Semi Radradra	Centre	13 July 1992 (aged 27)	6	(France) Bordeaux Bègles
Jale Vatubua	Centre	30 August 1991 (aged 28)	15	(France) Pau
Vereniki Goneva	Wing	5 April 1984 (aged 35)	57	(England) Harlequins
Filipo Nakosi	Wing	8 April 1992 (aged 27)	1	(France) Castres
Waisea Nayacalevu	Wing	26 June 1990 (aged 29)	17	(France) Stade Français
Josua Tuisova	Wing	4 February 1994 (aged 25)	9	(France) Lyon
Kini Murimurivalu	Fullback	15 May 1989 (aged 30)	26	(France) La Rochelle

=== Georgia ===
Georgia announced their 31-man squad for the tournament on 2 September 2019.

Head coach: (New Zealand) Milton Haig

Player	Position	Date of birth (age)	Caps	Club/province
Jaba Bregvadze	Hooker	24 March 1987 (aged 32)	54	(Japan) Sunwolves
Vano Karkadze	Hooker	25 June 2000 (aged 19)	3	(France) Brive
Shalva Mamukashvili	Hooker	2 October 1990 (aged 28)	68	Unattached
Levan Chilachava	Prop	17 August 1991 (aged 28)	49	(France) Montpellier
Beka Gigashvili	Prop	31 August 1993 (aged 26)	9	(France) Toulon
Guram Gogichashvili	Prop	4 September 1998 (aged 21)	6	(France) Racing 92
Giorgi Melikidze	Prop	24 June 1996 (aged 23)	14	(France) Stade Français
Mikheil Nariashvili	Prop	25 May 1990 (aged 29)	56	(France) Montpellier
Konstantin Mikautadze	Lock	1 July 1991 (aged 28)	59	(France) Montpellier
Giorgi Nemsadze	Lock	26 September 1984 (aged 34)	92	Aia Kutaisi
Shalva Sutiashvili	Lock	24 January 1984 (aged 35)	77	(France) Angouleme
Otar Giorgadze	Back row	2 March 1996 (aged 23)	21	(France) Brive
Beka Gorgadze	Back row	8 February 1996 (aged 23)	19	(France) Bordeaux
Mamuka Gorgodze	Back row	14 July 1984 (aged 35)	71	(France) Toulon
Lasha Lomidze	Back row	30 June 1992 (aged 27)	46	Unattached
Beka Saghinadze	Back row	29 October 1998 (aged 20)	5	(France) Aurillac
Giorgi Tkhilaishvili	Back row	8 April 1991 (aged 28)	50	Batumi RC
Gela Aprasidze	Scrum-half	14 January 1998 (aged 21)	17	(France) Montpellier
Giorgi Begadze	Scrum-half	4 March 1986 (aged 33)	65	RC Jiki Gori
Vasil Lobzhanidze	Scrum-half	14 October 1996 (aged 22)	45	(France) Brive
Tedo Abzhandadze	Fly-half	13 June 1999 (aged 20)	9	(France) Brive
Lasha Khmaladze	Fly-half	20 January 1988 (aged 31)	75	Batumi RC
Lasha Malaghuradze	Fly-half	2 January 1986 (aged 33)	92	(Russia) VVA-Podmoskovye
Davit Kacharava	Centre	16 January 1985 (aged 34)	116	(Russia) Enisei-STM
Giorgi Kveseladze	Centre	11 November 1997 (aged 21)	19	RC Jiki Gori
Tamaz Mchedlidze	Centre	17 March 1993 (aged 26)	53	(France) Rouen
Merab Sharikadze (c)	Centre	17 May 1993 (aged 26)	63	(France) Aurillac
Zurab Dzneladze	Wing	1 December 1993 (aged 25)	9	Locomotive
Mirian Modebadze	Wing	27 October 1997 (aged 21)	10	Aia Kutaisi
Alexander Todua	Wing	2 November 1987 (aged 31)	79	Batumi RC
Soso Matiashvili	Fullback	27 January 1993 (aged 26)	19	Lelo Saracens

=== Uruguay ===
Uruguay named their 31-man squad for the tournament on 30 August 2019.

Head coach: (Argentina) Esteban Meneses

Player	Position	Date of birth (age)	Caps	Club/province
Facundo Gattas	Hooker	2 July 1995 (aged 24)	30	(Argentina) Hindú
Germán Kessler	Hooker	1 July 1994 (aged 25)	49	Los Cuervos
Guillermo Pujadas	Hooker	6 February 1997 (aged 22)	9	Champagnat
Diego Arbelo	Prop	26 July 1992 (aged 27)	5	MVCC
Juan Echeverría	Prop	9 October 1991 (aged 27)	51	(United States) Austin Elite
Joaquín Jaunsolo	Prop	12 September 1998 (aged 21)	1	Los Cuervos
Juan Rombys	Prop	5 March 1987 (aged 32)	30	Trébol de Paysandú
Mateo Sanguinetti	Prop	26 July 1992 (aged 27)	63	(United States) Houston SaberCats
Ignacio Dotti	Lock	18 August 1994 (aged 25)	46	(United States) New Orleans Gold
Manuel Leindekar	Lock	23 April 1997 (aged 22)	14	(France) Oyonnax
Diego Magno	Lock	27 April 1989 (aged 30)	90	(United States) Houston SaberCats
Manuel Diana	Back row	4 March 1996 (aged 23)	22	Old Christians
Santiago Civetta	Back row	28 February 1998 (aged 21)	5	(England) Darlington Mowden Park
Franco Lamanna	Back row	5 October 1991 (aged 27)	44	Old Boys
Manuel Ardao	Back row	9 September 1998 (aged 21)	4	Old Christians
Juan Manuel Gaminara (c)	Back row	1 May 1989 (aged 30)	67	Old Boys
Alejandro Nieto	Back row	7 January 1988 (aged 31)	69	(United States) Houston SaberCats
Juan Diego Ormaechea	Back row	28 January 1989 (aged 30)	31	Carrasco Polo
Santiago Arata	Scrum-half	2 September 1996 (aged 23)	39	(United States) Houston SaberCats
Tomás Inciarte	Scrum-half	22 October 1996 (aged 22)	14	Old Christians
Agustín Ormaechea	Scrum-half	8 March 1991 (aged 28)	45	(France) Stade Montois
Felipe Berchesi	Fly-half	12 April 1991 (aged 28)	32	(France) Dax
Juan Manuel Cat	Fly-half	6 September 1996 (aged 23)	31	Old Boys
Agustín Della Corte	Centre	11 September 1997 (aged 22)	8	Trébol de Paysandú
Nicolás Freitas	Centre	3 July 1993 (aged 26)	34	Carrasco Polo
Andrés Vilaseca	Centre	8 May 1991 (aged 28)	55	(United States) Austin Elite
Federico Favaro	Wing	19 May 1991 (aged 28)	30	Old Christians
Leandro Leivas	Wing	6 July 1988 (aged 31)	74	(Canada) Toronto Arrows
Rodrigo Silva	Wing	2 November 1992 (aged 26)	57	(United States) Austin Elite
Felipe Echeverry	Fullback	23 June 1996 (aged 23)	2	Carrasco Polo
Gastón Mieres	Fullback	5 October 1989 (aged 29)	67	(Canada) Toronto Arrows

=== Wales ===
Wales announced their 31-man squad for the tournament on 1 September 2019.

^{1} On 24 September 2019 Cory Hill withdrew from the squad having failed to recover from injury and he was replaced by Bradley Davies.

^{2} On 22 October 2019 Josh Navidi withdrew from the squad having failed to recover from injury and he was replaced by Owen Lane.

Head coach: (New Zealand) Warren Gatland

Player	Position	Date of birth (age)	Caps	Club/province
Elliot Dee	Hooker	7 March 1994 (aged 25)	22	Dragons
Ryan Elias	Hooker	7 January 1995 (aged 24)	8	Scarlets
Ken Owens	Hooker	3 January 1987 (aged 32)	67	Scarlets
Rhys Carré	Prop	8 February 1998 (aged 21)	1	(England) Saracens
Tomas Francis	Prop	27 April 1992 (aged 27)	43	(England) Exeter Chiefs
Wyn Jones	Prop	26 February 1992 (aged 27)	15	Scarlets
Dillon Lewis	Prop	4 January 1996 (aged 23)	15	Cardiff Blues
Nicky Smith	Prop	7 April 1994 (aged 25)	31	Ospreys
Jake Ball	Lock	27 June 1991 (aged 28)	36	Scarlets
Adam Beard	Lock	7 January 1996 (aged 23)	16	Ospreys
Bradley Davies ^{1}	Lock	9 January 1987 (aged 32)	64	Ospreys
Cory Hill ^{1}	Lock	10 February 1992 (aged 27)	24	Dragons
Alun Wyn Jones (c)	Lock	19 September 1985 (aged 34)	128	Ospreys
James Davies	Back row	25 October 1990 (aged 28)	5	Scarlets
Ross Moriarty	Back row	18 April 1994 (aged 25)	34	Dragons
Josh Navidi ^{2}	Back row	30 December 1990 (aged 28)	19	Cardiff Blues
Aaron Shingler	Back row	7 August 1987 (aged 32)	20	Scarlets
Justin Tipuric	Back row	6 August 1989 (aged 30)	66	Ospreys
Aaron Wainwright	Back row	25 September 1997 (aged 21)	12	Dragons
Aled Davies	Scrum-half	19 July 1992 (aged 27)	19	Ospreys
Gareth Davies	Scrum-half	18 August 1990 (aged 29)	44	Scarlets
Tomos Williams	Scrum-half	1 January 1995 (aged 24)	9	Cardiff Blues
Dan Biggar	Fly-half	16 October 1989 (aged 29)	73	(England) Northampton Saints
Rhys Patchell	Fly-half	17 May 1993 (aged 26)	13	Scarlets
Jonathan Davies	Centre	5 April 1988 (aged 31)	76	Scarlets
Hadleigh Parkes	Centre	5 October 1987 (aged 31)	18	Scarlets
Owen Watkin	Centre	12 October 1996 (aged 22)	16	Ospreys
Josh Adams	Wing	21 April 1995 (aged 24)	14	Cardiff Blues
Hallam Amos	Wing	24 September 1994 (aged 24)	20	Cardiff Blues
Owen Lane ^{2}	Wing	20 December 1997 (aged 21)	1	Cardiff Blues
George North	Wing	13 April 1992 (aged 27)	86	Ospreys
Leigh Halfpenny	Fullback	22 December 1988 (aged 30)	82	Scarlets
Liam Williams	Fullback	9 April 1991 (aged 28)	58	(England) Saracens

== Statistics ==
All statistics relate to the initial 31-man squads named prior to the start of the tournament on 20 September 2019 and do not include players who joined a squad during the tournament.

- Five squads included no players based outside their home country: England, France, Ireland, Japan, and New Zealand.
- The squads with the fewest players playing domestically are Tonga (zero) and Samoa (one).

=== Player representation by club ===
The 620 participating players, 20 players unattached, represent 144 different club sides, the club sides with the most players selected are below:

Players	Clubs
26	(Argentina) Jaguares
20	(Namibia) Welwitschias
16	(Italy) Benetton, (Scotland) Glasgow Warriors
15	(England) Saracens
14	(Ireland) Leinster
13	(Wales) Scarlets
12	(New Zealand) Crusaders, (Ireland) Munster
11	(Scotland) Edinburgh
10	(France) Clermont, (Russia) Krasny Yar, (France) Racing, (France) Toulouse, (Italy) Zebre
9	(Australia) Brumbies, (Australia) Melbourne Rebels, (Wales) Ospreys, (Canada) Toronto Arrows

=== Players representation by league ===
League	Players	Percent
Total	620	—
Pro14 (Ireland) (Italy) (South Africa) (Scotland) (Wales)	118	19.0%
Super Rugby (Argentina) (Australia) (Japan) (New Zealand) (South Africa)	118	19.0%
Top 14 (France)	78	12.5%
Premiership Rugby (England)	74	11.9%
Major League Rugby (United States) (Canada)	37	5.9%
Top League (Japan)	32	5.1%
Rugby Premier League (Russia)	31	5.0%
Namibia *	20	3.2%
Campeonato Uruguayo de Rugby (Uruguay)	16	2.5%
Pro D2 (France)	16	2.5%
RFU Championship (England)	13	2.0%
Global Rapid Rugby (Australia) (Fiji) (Hong Kong) (Singapore) (Samoa)	10	1.6%
Didi 10 (Georgia (country))	9	1.5%
Other	28	4.5%
Unattached	20	3.2%

* Namibia's Welwitschias most recently played in South Africa's 2019 Rugby Challenge but do not appear in a regular league as such.

=== Player representation by nation ===
Union	Players	Percent	Other national squad
Total	620	—	—
Argentina	29	4.7%	1
Australia	38	6.1%	8
Canada	13	2.1%	2
England	88	14.2%	57
Fiji	4	0.7%	—
France	96	15.5%	65
(Georgia (country)) Georgia	9	1.5%	—
Ireland	31	5.0%	—
Italy	26	4.2%	1
Japan	34	5.4%	3
Namibia	20	3.2%	—
New Zealand	41	6.6%	10
Russia	31	5.0%	2
Samoa	3	0.3%	—
Scotland	28	4.5%	5
South Africa	28	3.8%	4
United States	28	4.5%	18
Uruguay	16	2.6%	—
Wales	32	5.2%	5
Other	5	0.0%	3
Unattached	20	2.9%	—

=== Average age of squads ===
Nation	Avg. Age	Oldest player	Youngest player
Argentina	27	Juan Manuel Leguizamón (36 years, 106 days)	Mayco Vivas (21 years, 109 days)
Australia	27	Adam Ashley-Cooper (35 years, 177 days)	Jordan Petaia (19 years, 198 days)
Canada	28	Hubert Buydens (37 years, 258 days)	Cole Keith (22 years, 135 days)
England	27	Willi Heinz (32 years, 300 days)	Tom Curry (21 years, 97 days)
Fiji	28	Vereniki Goneva (35 years, 168 days)	Ratu Veremalua Vugakoto (21 years, 265 days)
France	27	Louis Picamoles (33 years, 227 days)	Romain Ntamack (20 years, 142 days)
Georgia	27	Shalva Sutiashvili (35 years, 239 days)	Vano Karkadze (19 years, 87 days)
Ireland	28	Rory Best (37 years, 36 days)	Jordan Larmour (22 years, 102 days)
Italy	28	Sergio Parisse (36 years, 8 days)	Marco Riccioni (21 years, 1 day)
Japan	29	Luke Thompson (38 years, 257 days)	Ataata Moeakiola (23 years, 225 days)
Namibia	26	PJ van Lill (35 years, 290 days)	Prince ǃGaoseb (21 years, 75 days)
New Zealand	27	Sonny Bill Williams (34 years, 48 days)	Rieko Ioane (22 years 188 days)
Russia	29	Andrey Garbuzov (36 years, 44 days)	Bogdan Fedotko (24 years, 363 days)
Samoa	31	Tusi Pisi (37 years, 94 days)	Melani Matavao (23 years, 305 days)
Scotland	27	Greig Laidlaw (33 years, 343 days)	Darcy Graham (22 years, 91 days)
South Africa	28	Schalk Brits (38 years, 127 days)	Herschel Jantjies (23 years, 151 days)
Tonga	29	Kurt Morath (34 years, 311 days)	Siua Maile (22 years, 214 days)
United States	27	Olive Kilifi (32 years, 357 days)	David Ainuu (19 years, 304 days)
Uruguay	26	Juan Rombys (32 years, 199 days)	Germán Kessler (21 years, 79 days)
Wales	27	Alun Wyn Jones (34 years, 1 day)	Rhys Carré (21 years, 224 days)

=== Squad caps ===
Nation	Caps	Most capped player	Least capped player
Australia	1421	Adam Ashley-Cooper (119)	Jordan Petaia (0)
Georgia	1370	Davit Kacharava (116)	Vano Karkadze (3)
New Zealand	1220	Kieran Read (122)	Atu Moli (2); Brad Weber (2)
Ireland	1142	Rory Best (120)	Jean Kleyn (3)
Argentina	1120	Juan Manuel Leguizamón (86)	Santiago Carreras (1); Lucas Mensa (1)
Uruguay	1118	Diego Magno (90)	Joaquín Jaunsolo (1)
Wales	1089	Alun Wyn Jones (128)	Rhys Carré (1)
England	1074	Dan Cole (89); Ben Youngs (89)	Ruaridh McConnochie (1)
South Africa	1054	Tendai Mtawarira (111)	Herschel Jantjies (4); Kwagga Smith (4)
Russia	1032	Yuri Kushnarev (109)	Kirill Gotovtsev (4)
Italy	1002	Sergio Parisse (140)	Callum Braley (3)
Scotland	923	John Barclay (74)	Blade Thomson (2)
Canada	889	Ciaran Hearn (80)	Andrew Quattrin (3)
France	807	Louis Picamoles (79)	Peato Mauvaka (1)
Japan	705	Fumiaki Tanaka (70)	Takuya Kitade (1)
United States	678	Blaine Scully (50)	Ben Pinkelman (2)
Fiji	651	Campese Ma'afu (58)	Filipo Nakosi (1)
Namibia	614	Eugene Jantjies (67)	PJ Walters (0)
Tonga	439	Siale Piutau (39)	Siua Maile (1)
Samoa	434	Tusi Pisi (38)	Michael Alaalatoa (1)

=== Previous World Cup experience ===
==== By matches ====
Player	RWC Matches
(Australia) Adam Ashley-Cooper	17
(Wales) Alun Wyn Jones	15
(Argentina) Juan Manuel Leguizamón	14
(New Zealand) Sam Whitelock	14
(New Zealand) Sonny Bill Williams	14
(Australia) Sekope Kepu	13
(Italy) Sergio Parisse	13
(Australia) Rob Simmons	13
(Australia) James Slipper	13
(Australia) Kurtley Beale	12
(Australia) Will Genia	12
(Canada) D. T. H. van der Merwe	12
(Ireland) Rory Best	11
(Argentina) Agustin Creevy	11
(Georgia (country)) Mamuka Gorgodze	11
(Namibia) Eugene Jantjies	11
(South Africa) Tendai Mtawarira	11
(Wales) George North	11
(New Zealand) Kieran Read	11
(South Africa) François Steyn	11
(Ireland) Keith Earls	10
(Georgia (country)) Davit Kacharava	10
(South Africa) Francois Louw	10
(Australia) David Pocock	10
(Japan) Luke Thompson	10

==== By tournaments ====
Player	World Cups
(Italy) Sergio Parisse	4
(Australia) Adam Ashley-Cooper	3
(Ireland) Rory Best	3
(Italy) Leonardo Ghiraldini	3
(Georgia (country)) Mamuka Gorgodze	3
(Namibia) Eugene Jantjies	3
(Wales) Alun Wyn Jones	3
(Georgia (country)) Davit Kacharava	3
(Argentina) Juan Manuel Leguizamón	3
(Japan) Luke Thompson	3
(Canada) D. T. H. van der Merwe	3
(Italy) Alessandro Zanni	3
