= 2019 Rugby World Cup Pool B =

Pool B of the 2019 Rugby World Cup began on 21 September 2019. The pool included title holders New Zealand and third-placed team from 2015 South Africa, while Italy also joined the pool after finishing third in their pool in 2015. They were joined by the African qualifier, Namibia, and the repechage winner, Canada.

Neither of the final two matches in the pool were played due to the effects of Typhoon Hagibis; New Zealand were a point behind South Africa, who had played all four of their matches, going into the final game against Italy, so the two points awarded for the cancelled match saw New Zealand take top spot in the pool, while Italy finished third behind South Africa. Neither Namibia nor Canada managed a win in their first three matches, and the cancellation of their final match meant they finished level on points, with Namibia finishing higher on points difference.

== Overview ==
Pool B started with New Zealand beating South Africa 23–13. New Zealand opened their scoring with two tries in four minutes from George Bridge and Scott Barrett giving New Zealand a 17–3 lead at half-time. Pieter-Steph du Toit scored a converted try to bring the score back to 17–10 but two penalties from Richie Mo'unga and Beauden Barrett sealed the result. In Higashiōsaka, Italy conceded an early try against Namibia before running away with a bonus-point victory by 25 points. Italy earned a second bonus-point victory in Fukuoka, scoring seven tries in a 48–7 demolition of Canada. Over in Toyota, South Africa defeated Namibia by 54 points, scoring nine tries while Namibia could manage only a Cliven Loubser penalty in the 23rd minute. New Zealand recorded their second victory of the World Cup with a 63–0 victory over Canada at Ōita Stadium. For New Zealand, Brad Weber scored his first two tries in international rugby with the Barrett brothers (Jordie Barrett, Beauden Barrett and Scott Barrett) each scoring a try as they became first trio of brothers to start for New Zealand.

New Zealand would continue their demolition of their opponents with a 62-point win over Namibia in Chōfu, with the floodgates opening in the second half after Namibia restricted the All Blacks to 24 points in the first half. Sevu Reece, Ben Smith and Anton Lienert-Brown scoring two tries in the match. Between the two New Zealand games, South Africa romped over Italy with Cheslin Kolbe scoring two tries as the South Africans won 49–3 in Fukuroi. This was followed by a 66–7 victory over Canada with Cobus Reinach scoring the fastest hat-trick in World Cup history, with his three tries being scored in a space of 11 minutes. The final two matches of the group would not be played as Typhoon Hagibis would see the cancellation of the New Zealand–Italy and Namibia–Canada matches. At the end of the pool stage, New Zealand finished on top of the table with South Africa finishing second.

== Standings ==
Pos	Team	Pld	W	D	L	PF	PA	PD	T	B	Pts	Qualification
1	New Zealand	4	3	1	0	157	22	+135	22	2	16	Advanced to the quarter-finals and qualified for the 2023 Rugby World Cup
2	South Africa	4	3	0	1	185	36	+149	27	3	15	Advanced to the quarter-finals and qualified for the 2023 Rugby World Cup
3	Italy	4	2	1	1	98	78	+20	14	2	12	Eliminated but qualified for 2023 Rugby World Cup
4	Namibia	4	0	1	3	34	175	−141	3	0	2	
5	Canada	4	0	1	3	14	177	−163	2	0	2	

== Matches ==
All times are local Japan Standard Time (UTC+09)

=== New Zealand vs South Africa ===
21 September 2019
18:45 JST (UTC+09)

New Zealand	23–13	South Africa
Try: Bridge 24' c S. Barrett 27' c Con: Mo'unga (2/2) 25', 28'; Pen: Mo'unga (2/3) 23', 67'; B. Barrett (1/1) 72'	Report	Try: P. du Toit 48' c Con: Pollard (1/1) 49'; Pen: Pollard (1/2) 2'; Drop: Pollard (1/1) 59'

International Stadium Yokohama, Yokohama
Attendance: 63,649
Referee: Jérôme Garcès (France)

New Zealand	South Africa

FB	15	Beauden Barrett
RW	14	Sevu Reece
OC	13	Anton Lienert-Brown
IC	12	Ryan Crotty	(substituted off) 51'
LW	11	George Bridge
FH	10	Richie Mo'unga	(substituted off) 67'
SH	9	Aaron Smith	(substituted off) 62'
N8	8	Kieran Read (c)
OF	7	Sam Cane	(substituted off) 40'
BF	6	Ardie Savea
RL	5	Scott Barrett	(substituted off) 76'
LL	4	Sam Whitelock
TP	3	Nepo Laulala	(substituted off) 51'
HK	2	Dane Coles	(substituted off) 40'
LP	1	Joe Moody	(substituted off) 51'
Replacements:
HK	16	Codie Taylor	(substituted in) 40'
PR	17	Ofa Tu'ungafasi	(substituted in) 51'
PR	18	Angus Ta'avao	(substituted in) 51'
LK	19	Patrick Tuipulotu	(substituted in) 40'
FL	20	Shannon Frizell	(substituted in) 76'
SH	21	TJ Perenara	(substituted in) 62'
CE	22	Sonny Bill Williams	(substituted in) 51'
FB	23	Ben Smith	(substituted in) 67'
Coach:
(New Zealand) Steve Hansen

FB	15	Willie le Roux
RW	14	Cheslin Kolbe
OC	13	Lukhanyo Am	(substituted off) 57'
IC	12	Damian de Allende
LW	11	Makazole Mapimpi
FH	10	Handré Pollard
SH	9	Faf de Klerk	(substituted off) 72'
N8	8	Duane Vermeulen
OF	7	Pieter-Steph du Toit
BF	6	Siya Kolisi (c)	(substituted off) 51'
RL	5	Franco Mostert
LL	4	Eben Etzebeth	(substituted off) 70'
TP	3	Frans Malherbe	(substituted off) 55'	(substituted in) 76'
HK	2	Malcolm Marx	(substituted off) 62'
LP	1	Steven Kitshoff	(substituted off) 68'
Replacements:
HK	16	Bongi Mbonambi	(substituted in) 62'
PR	17	Tendai Mtawarira	(substituted in) 68'
PR	18	Trevor Nyakane	(substituted in) 55'	(substituted off) 76'
LK	19	RG Snyman	(substituted in) 70'
FL	20	Francois Louw	(substituted in) 51'
SH	21	Herschel Jantjies	(substituted in) 72'
CE	22	François Steyn
CE	23	Jesse Kriel	(substituted in) 57'
Coach:
(South Africa) Rassie Erasmus

Player of the Match:
Beauden Barrett (New Zealand)

Assistant referees:
Romain Poite (France)
Karl Dickson (England)
Television match official:
Graham Hughes (England)

Notes:

- Duane Vermeulen (South Africa) earned his 50th test cap.

=== Italy vs Namibia ===
22 September 2019
14:15 JST (UTC+09)

(1 BP) Italy	47–22	Namibia
Try: Penalty try 11'; Allan 26' c Tebaldi 40+1' c Bellini 44' c Canna 47' c Polledri 70' m Minozzi 76' c Con: Allan (3/3) 27', 40+2', 45'; Canna (2/3) 48', 77'	Report	Try: Stevens 6' c Greyling 57' m Plato 79' c Con: Loubser (2/3) 7', 80'; Pen: Loubser (1/1) 51'

Hanazono Rugby Stadium, Higashiōsaka
Attendance: 20,354
Referee: Nic Berry (Australia)

Italy	Namibia

FB	15	Jayden Hayward	(substituted off) 45'
RW	14	Edoardo Padovani
OC	13	Tommaso Benvenuti
IC	12	Luca Morisi
LW	11	Mattia Bellini
FH	10	Tommaso Allan	(substituted off) 45'
SH	9	Tito Tebaldi	(substituted off) 59'
N8	8	Sergio Parisse (c)
OF	7	Maxime Mbanda
BF	6	Braam Steyn	(substituted off) 45'
RL	5	Federico Ruzza	(substituted off) 45'
LL	4	Alessandro Zanni
TP	3	Tiziano Pasquali	(substituted off) 39'
HK	2	Luca Bigi	(substituted off) 45'
LP	1	Andrea Lovotti	(substituted off) 45'
Replacements:
HK	16	Oliviero Fabiani	(substituted in) 45'
PR	17	Simone Ferrari	(substituted in) 45'
PR	18	Marco Riccioni	(substituted in) 39'
LK	19	Dean Budd	(substituted in) 45'
FL	20	Jake Polledri	(substituted in) 45'
SH	21	Guglielmo Palazzani	(substituted in) 59'
FH	22	Carlo Canna	(substituted in) 45'
WG	23	Matteo Minozzi	(substituted in) 45'
Coach:
(Ireland) Conor O'Shea

FB	15	Johann Tromp	(substituted off) 68'
RW	14	Chad Plato
OC	13	Justin Newman	(substituted off) 48'
IC	12	Darryl de la Harpe
LW	11	JC Greyling
FH	10	Cliven Loubser
SH	9	Damian Stevens	(substituted off) 48'
N8	8	Janco Venter
OF	7	Wian Conradie
BF	6	Rohan Kitshoff	(substituted off) 40'
RL	5	Tjiuee Uanivi (c)
LL	4	PJ van Lill	(substituted off) 57'
TP	3	Aranos Coetzee	(substituted off) 57'
HK	2	Torsten van Jaarsveld	(substituted off) 57'
LP	1	André Rademeyer	(substituted off) 71'
Replacements:
HK	16	Louis van der Westhuizen	(substituted in) 57'
PR	17	AJ de Klerk	(substituted in) 57'
PR	18	Nelius Theron	(substituted in) 71'
LK	19	Johan Retief	(substituted in) 57'
FL	20	Max Katjijeko	(substituted in) 40'
WG	21	PJ Walters	(substituted in) 68'
SH	22	Eugene Jantjies	(substituted in) 48'
SH	23	TC Kisting	(substituted in) 48'
Coach:
(Wales) Phil Davies

Player of the Match:
Federico Ruzza (Italy)

Assistant referees:
Nigel Owens (Wales)
Federico Anselmi (Argentina)
Television match official:
Marius Jonker (South Africa)

Notes:

- PJ Walters (Namibia) made his international debut.
- Darryl de la Harpe (Namibia) earned his 50th test cap.

=== Italy vs Canada ===
26 September 2019
16:45 JST (UTC+09)

(1 BP) Italy	48–7	Canada
Try: Steyn 8' c Budd 13' c Negri 44' c Penalty try 59'; Bellini 62' m Zani 73' c Minozzi 79' m Con: Allan (3/4) 9', 14', 45'; Canna (1/2) 74'; Pen: Allan (1/1) 3'	Report	Try: Coe 69' c Con: Nelson (1/1) 71'

Fukuoka Hakatanomori Stadium, Fukuoka
Attendance: 16,984
Referee: Nigel Owens (Wales)

Italy	Canada

FB	15	Matteo Minozzi
RW	14	Tommaso Benvenuti	(substituted off) 40'
OC	13	Michele Campagnaro
IC	12	Jayden Hayward
LW	11	Giulio Bisegni
FH	10	Tommaso Allan	(substituted off) 63'
SH	9	Callum Braley	(substituted off) 72'
N8	8	Braam Steyn	(substituted off) 63'
OF	7	Jake Polledri
BF	6	Sebastian Negri
RL	5	Dean Budd (c)
LL	4	David Sisi	(substituted off) 55'
TP	3	Simone Ferrari	(substituted off) 47'
HK	2	Luca Bigi	(substituted off) 59'
LP	1	Andrea Lovotti	(substituted off) 47'
Replacements:
HK	16	Federico Zani	(substituted in) 59'
PR	17	Nicola Quaglio	(substituted in) 47'
PR	18	Marco Riccioni	(substituted in) 47'
LK	19	Federico Ruzza	(substituted in) 55'
FL	20	Maxime Mbanda	(substituted in) 63'
SH	21	Guglielmo Palazzani	(substituted in) 72'
FH	22	Carlo Canna	(substituted in) 63'
WG	23	Mattia Bellini	(substituted in) 40'
Coach:
(Ireland) Conor O'Shea

FB	15	Pat Parfrey
RW	14	Jeff Hassler		(substituted off) 63'
OC	13	Ben LeSage
IC	12	Nick Blevins		(substituted off) 9'
LW	11	D. T. H. van der Merwe
FH	10	Peter Nelson
SH	9	Gordon McRorie		(substituted off) 66'
N8	8	Tyler Ardron (c)
OF	7	Lucas Rumball		(substituted off) 16'
BF	6	Mike Sheppard		(substituted off) 77'
RL	5	Josh Larsen
LL	4	Conor Keys
TP	3	Matt Tierney		(substituted off) 51'
HK	2	Eric Howard		(substituted off) 58'
LP	1	Hubert Buydens		(substituted off) 39'
Replacements:
HK	16	Benoît Piffero		(substituted in) 51'
PR	17	Djustice Sears-Duru		(substituted in) 39'
PR	18	Jake Ilnicki		(substituted in) 58'
LK	19	Luke Campbell		(substituted in) 76'
FL	20	Matt Heaton	(yellow card) 59'	(substituted in) 16'
SH	21	Jamie Mackenzie		(substituted in) 66'
CE	22	Ciaran Hearn		(substituted in) 9'
FB	23	Andrew Coe		(substituted in) 63'
Coach:
(Wales) Kingsley Jones

Player of the Match:
Jake Polledri (Italy)

Assistant referees:
Wayne Barnes (England)
Karl Dickson (England)
Television match official:
Rowan Kitt (England)

Notes:

- Djustice Sears-Duru (Canada) earned his 50th test cap.
- This was Italy's biggest winning margin at a Rugby World Cup.

=== South Africa vs Namibia ===
28 September 2019
18:45 JST (UTC+09)

(1 BP) South Africa	57–3	Namibia
Try: Mbonambi (2) 10' c, 17' c Louw 15' m Mapimpi (2) 27' m, 54' c Am 42' c Gelant 48' c Kolisi 59' m Brits 64' c Con: E. Jantjies (6/9) 11', 19', 43', 50', 55', 66'	Report	Pen: Loubser (1/2) 24'

City of Toyota Stadium, Toyota
Attendance: 36,449
Referee: Mathieu Raynal (France)

South Africa	Namibia

FB	15	Warrick Gelant
RW	14	S'busiso Nkosi
OC	13	Lukhanyo Am	(substituted off) 55'
IC	12	François Steyn
LW	11	Makazole Mapimpi
FH	10	Elton Jantjies
SH	9	Herschel Jantjies	(substituted off) 57'
N8	8	Schalk Brits (c)
OF	7	Kwagga Smith	(substituted off) 53'
BF	6	Francois Louw
RL	5	Lood de Jager
LL	4	RG Snyman	(substituted off) 58'
TP	3	Vincent Koch	(substituted off) 46'
HK	2	Bongi Mbonambi	(substituted off) 64'
LP	1	Tendai Mtawarira	(substituted off) 70'
Replacements:
PR	16	Steven Kitshoff	(substituted in) 70'
PR	17	Thomas du Toit	(substituted in) 46'
LK	18	Eben Etzebeth	(substituted in) 58'
FL	19	Siya Kolisi	(substituted in) 53'
LK	20	Franco Mostert	(substituted in) 64'
SH	21	Cobus Reinach	(substituted in) 57'
CE	22	Damian de Allende	(substituted in) 55'
WG	23	Cheslin Kolbe
Coach:
(South Africa) Rassie Erasmus

FB	15	Johann Tromp
RW	14	Chad Plato			(substituted off) 68'	(substituted in) 76'
OC	13	JC Greyling
IC	12	PJ Walters		(substituted off) 50'
LW	11	Lesley Klim
FH	10	Cliven Loubser
SH	9	Eugene Jantjies
N8	8	Adriaan Booysen	(yellow card) 17'	(substituted off) 50'
OF	7	Max Katjijeko
BF	6	Thomasau Forbes		(substituted off) 50'
RL	5	Tjiuee Uanivi (c)
LL	4	Johan Retief
TP	3	AJ de Klerk		(substituted off) 50'	(substituted in) 68'	(substituted off) 76'
HK	2	Louis van der Westhuizen		(substituted off) 76'
LP	1	Des Sethie		(substituted off) 50'
Replacements:
HK	16	Obert Nortjé		(substituted in) 76'
PR	17	André Rademeyer		(substituted in) 50'
PR	18	Aranos Coetzee	(yellow card) 64'	(substituted in) 50'
FL	19	Prince ǃGaoseb
FL	20	Janco Venter		(substituted in) 50'
FL	21	Wian Conradie		(substituted in) 50'
WG	22	TC Kisting
CE	23	Johan Deysel		(substituted in) 50'
Coach:
(Wales) Phil Davies

Player of the Match:
Lood de Jager (South Africa)

Assistant referees:
Nic Berry (Australia)
Andrew Brace (Ireland)
Television match official:
Graham Hughes (England)

=== New Zealand vs Canada ===
2 October 2019
19:15 JST (UTC+09)

(1 BP) New Zealand	63–0	Canada
Try: Penalty try 5'; J. Barrett 9' c Williams 17' c B. Barrett 36' c Ioane 41' c S. Barrett 45' c Frizell 47' c Weber (2) 50' c, 57' c Con: Mo'unga (8/8) 10', 19', 37', 43', 46', 49', 51', 59'	Report

Oita Stadium, Ōita
Attendance: 34,411
Referee: Romain Poite (France)

New Zealand	Canada

FB	15	Beauden Barrett
RW	14	Jordie Barrett
OC	13	Jack Goodhue	(substituted off) 40'
IC	12	Sonny Bill Williams	(substituted off) 51'
LW	11	Rieko Ioane
FH	10	Richie Mo'unga
SH	9	TJ Perenara	(substituted off) 40'
N8	8	Kieran Read (c)
OF	7	Matt Todd	(substituted off) 71'
BF	6	Shannon Frizell
RL	5	Scott Barrett
LL	4	Patrick Tuipulotu	(substituted off) 71'
TP	3	Angus Ta'avao	(substituted off) 26'
HK	2	Liam Coltman	(substituted off) 71'
LP	1	Atunaisa Moli
Replacements:
HK	16	Codie Taylor	(substituted in) 71'
PR	17	Ofa Tu'ungafasi		(substituted in) 51'
PR	18	Nepo Laulala	(substituted in) 26'	(substituted off) 51'
LK	19	Sam Whitelock	(substituted in) 71'
FL	20	Ardie Savea	(substituted in) 71'
SH	21	Brad Weber	(substituted in) 40'
CE	22	Ryan Crotty	(substituted in) 40'
FB	23	Ben Smith	(substituted in) 51'
Coach:
(New Zealand) Steve Hansen

FB	15	Pat Parfrey	(substituted off) 52'
RW	14	Jeff Hassler
OC	13	Conor Trainor
IC	12	Ciaran Hearn
LW	11	D. T. H. van der Merwe	(substituted off) 61'	(substituted in) 73'
FH	10	Peter Nelson
SH	9	Gordon McRorie	(substituted off) 66'
N8	8	Tyler Ardron (c)
OF	7	Matt Heaton
BF	6	Lucas Rumball
RL	5	Conor Keys	(substituted off) 61'
LL	4	Evan Olmstead	(substituted off) 46'
TP	3	Cole Keith	(substituted off) 49'
HK	2	Eric Howard	(substituted off) 41'
LP	1	Djustice Sears-Duru	(substituted off) 69'
Replacements:
HK	16	Andrew Quattrin	(substituted in) 41'
PR	17	Hubert Buydens	(substituted in) 69'
PR	18	Jake Ilnicki	(substituted in) 49'
LK	19	Mike Sheppard	(substituted in) 61'
LK	20	Josh Larsen	(substituted in) 46'
SH	21	Phil Mack	(substituted in) 66'
WG	22	Taylor Paris	(substituted in) 61'	(substituted off) 73'
FB	23	Andrew Coe	(substituted in) 52'
Coach:
(Wales) Kingsley Jones

Player of the Match:
Richie Mo'unga (New Zealand)

Assistant referees:
Pascal Gaüzère (France)
Alexandre Ruiz (France)
Television match official:
Marius Jonker (South Africa)

Notes:

- Beauden Barrett, Jordie Barrett and Scott Barrett became the first trio of brothers to start for New Zealand in a World Cup match, and the first to all start in a World Cup match since Elisi Vunipola, Manu Vunipola, and Fe'ao Vunipola all played for Tonga in 1995. The Barrett brothers also became the first trio of brothers to all score a try in the same match.
- Richie Mo'unga's eight successful conversion attempts is the most without missing in a Rugby World Cup match.

=== South Africa vs Italy ===
4 October 2019
18:45 JST (UTC+09)

(1 BP) South Africa	49–3	Italy
Try: Kolbe (2) 6' c, 53' m Mbonambi 27' c Am 58' c Mapimpi 68' c Snyman 76' m Marx 80+3' m Con: Pollard (4/7) 7', 28', 60', 69'; Pen: Pollard (2/2) 12', 51'	Report	Pen: Allan (1/1) 9'

Shizuoka Stadium Ecopa, Fukuroi
Attendance: 44,148
Referee: Wayne Barnes (England)

South Africa	Italy

FB	15	Willie le Roux
RW	14	Cheslin Kolbe	(substituted off) 80'
OC	13	Lukhanyo Am			(substituted off) 70'
IC	12	Damian de Allende
LW	11	Makazole Mapimpi	(substituted off) 44'	(substituted in) 54'
FH	10	Handré Pollard
SH	9	Faf de Klerk	(substituted off) 61'
N8	8	Duane Vermeulen	(substituted off) 65'
OF	7	Pieter-Steph du Toit
BF	6	Siya Kolisi (c)
RL	5	Lood de Jager	(substituted off) 61'
LL	4	Eben Etzebeth	(substituted off) 54'
TP	3	Frans Malherbe	(substituted off) 46'
HK	2	Bongi Mbonambi	(substituted off) 51'
LP	1	Tendai Mtawarira	(substituted off) 46'
Replacements:
HK	16	Malcolm Marx	(substituted in) 51'
PR	17	Steven Kitshoff	(substituted in) 46'
PR	18	Vincent Koch	(substituted in) 46'
LK	19	RG Snyman	(substituted in) 54'
LK	20	Franco Mostert	(substituted in) 61'
FL	21	Francois Louw	(substituted in) 65'
SH	22	Herschel Jantjies	(substituted in) 61'
CE	23	François Steyn	(substituted in) 44'	(substituted off) 54'	(substituted in) 70'
Coach:
(South Africa) Rassie Erasmus

FB	15	Matteo Minozzi
RW	14	Tommaso Benvenuti		(substituted off) 69'
OC	13	Luca Morisi		(substituted off) 57'
IC	12	Jayden Hayward
LW	11	Michele Campagnaro
FH	10	Tommaso Allan
SH	9	Tito Tebaldi		(substituted off) 60'
N8	8	Sergio Parisse (c)		(substituted off) 60'
OF	7	Jake Polledri
BF	6	Braam Steyn
RL	5	Dean Budd		(substituted off) 46'
LL	4	David Sisi		(substituted off) 46'
TP	3	Simone Ferrari		(substituted off) 2'
HK	2	Luca Bigi
LP	1	Andrea Lovotti	(red card) 44'
Replacements:
HK	16	Federico Zani		(substituted in) 57'
PR	17	Nicola Quaglio			(substituted in) 19'
PR	18	Marco Riccioni		(substituted in) 2'	(substituted off) 19'
LK	19	Alessandro Zanni		(substituted in) 46'
LK	20	Federico Ruzza		(substituted in) 46'
FL	21	Sebastian Negri		(substituted in) 60'
SH	22	Callum Braley		(substituted in) 60'
FH	23	Carlo Canna		(substituted in) 69'
Coach:
(Ireland) Conor O'Shea

Player of the Match:
Cheslin Kolbe (South Africa)

Assistant referees:
Romain Poite (France)
Alexandre Ruiz (France)
Television match official:
Rowan Kitt (England)

Notes:

- Sergio Parisse played in his 15th World Cup match, an Italian record.
- Andrea Lovotti became the fourth player to receive a red during the 2019 World Cup, matching a tournament high set in 1995 and 1999.
- With injuries to both the starting tighthead and reserve tighthead for Italy, scrums went uncontested from the 18th minute.
- No replacement was issued for Cheslin Kolbe.

=== New Zealand vs Namibia ===
6 October 2019
13:45 JST (UTC+09)

(1 BP) New Zealand	71–9	Namibia
Try: Reece (2) 6' m, 53' c Lienert-Brown (2) 21' m, 47' c Ta'avao 36' c B. Smith (2) 40+5' c, 68' c Moody 42' m Whitelock 56' c J. Barrett 76' c Perenara 79' m Con: J. Barrett (8/11) 37', 40+6', 44', 48', 53', 57', 69', 77'	Report	Pen: Stevens (3/3) 3', 26', 30'

Tokyo Stadium, Chōfu
Attendance: 48,354
Referee: Pascal Gaüzère (France)

New Zealand	Namibia

FB	15	Ben Smith
RW	14	Sevu Reece		(substituted off) 67'
OC	13	Jack Goodhue		(substituted off) 61'
IC	12	Anton Lienert-Brown
LW	11	George Bridge
FH	10	Jordie Barrett
SH	9	Aaron Smith		(substituted off) 51'
N8	8	Ardie Savea		(substituted off) 61'
OF	7	Sam Cane		(substituted off) 32'	(substituted in) 44'
BF	6	Shannon Frizell
RL	5	Sam Whitelock (c)
LL	4	Brodie Retallick		(substituted off) 31'
TP	3	Nepo Laulala	(yellow card) 32'		(substituted off) 44'
HK	2	Codie Taylor		(substituted off) 51'
LP	1	Joe Moody		(substituted off) 54'
Replacements:
HK	16	Dane Coles		(substituted in) 51'
PR	17	Ofa Tu'ungafasi	(yellow card) 73'	(substituted in) 54'
PR	18	Angus Ta'avao		(substituted in) 32'
LK	19	Patrick Tuipulotu		(substituted in) 31'
FL	20	Matt Todd		(substituted in) 61'
SH	21	Brad Weber		(substituted in) 51'
SH	22	TJ Perenara		(substituted in) 67'
WG	23	Rieko Ioane		(substituted in) 61'
Coach:
(New Zealand) Steve Hansen

FB	15	Johann Tromp
RW	14	Lesley Klim
OC	13	Justin Newman
IC	12	Johan Deysel (c)	(substituted off) 57'
LW	11	J. C. Greyling	(substituted off) 51'
FH	10	Helarius Kisting
SH	9	Damian Stevens	(substituted off) 67'
N8	8	Janco Venter
OF	7	Thomasau Forbes	(substituted off) 62'
BF	6	Prince ǃGaoseb
RL	5	Tjiuee Uanivi
LL	4	P. J. van Lill	(substituted off) 17'
TP	3	A. J. de Klerk	(substituted off) 40'
HK	2	Torsten van Jaarsveld	(substituted off) 67'
LP	1	André Rademeyer	(substituted off) 76'
Replacements:
HK	16	Obert Nortjé	(substituted in) 67'
PR	17	Nelius Theron	(substituted in) 76'
PR	18	Aranos Coetzee	(substituted in) 40'
LK	19	Johan Retief	(substituted in) 17'
N8	20	Adriaan Booysen	(substituted in) 62'
SH	21	Eugene Jantjies	(substituted in) 67'
CE	22	Darryl de la Harpe	(substituted in) 57'
CE	23	Janry du Toit	(substituted in) 51'
Coach:
(Wales) Phil Davies

Player of the Match:
Anton Lienert-Brown (New Zealand)

Assistant referees:
Luke Pearce (England)
Shuhei Kubo (Japan)
Television match official:
Rowan Kitt (England)

=== South Africa vs Canada ===
8 October 2019
19:15 JST (UTC+09)

(1 BP) South Africa	66–7	Canada
Try: De Allende 3' c Nkosi 6' m Reinach (3) 10' c, 18' c, 21' c Gelant 28' c Steyn 40'+1 c Brits 55' c Willemse 66' c Malherbe 73' m Con: E. Jantjies (8/10) 3', 12', 20', 22', 29', 40'+2, 56', 68'	Report	Try: Heaton 46' c Con: Nelson (1/1) 48'

Kobe Misaki Stadium, Kobe
Attendance: 28,014
Referee: Luke Pearce (England)

South Africa	Canada

FB	15	Damian Willemse
RW	14	Warrick Gelant
OC	13	Damian de Allende	(substituted off) 63'
IC	12	François Steyn
LW	11	S'busiso Nkosi
FH	10	Elton Jantjies
SH	9	Cobus Reinach	(substituted off) 52'
N8	8	Francois Louw
OF	7	Kwagga Smith
BF	6	Siya Kolisi (c)
RL	5	Franco Mostert
LL	4	RG Snyman
TP	3	Vincent Koch	(substituted off) 54'
HK	2	Schalk Brits	(substituted off) 58'
LP	1	Thomas du Toit	(substituted off) 54'
Replacements:
HK	16	Malcolm Marx	(substituted in) 58'
PR	17	Steven Kitshoff	(substituted in) 54'
PR	18	Frans Malherbe	(substituted in) 54'
LK	19	Eben Etzebeth
FL	20	Pieter-Steph du Toit
SH	21	Herschel Jantjies	(substituted in) 52'
FH	22	Handré Pollard	(substituted in) 63'
FB	23	Willie le Roux
Coach:
(South Africa) Rassie Erasmus

FB	15	Andrew Coe
RW	14	Jeff Hassler
OC	13	Conor Trainor
IC	12	Ciaran Hearn		(substituted off) 75'
LW	11	D. T. H. van der Merwe
FH	10	Peter Nelson		(substituted off) 63'
SH	9	Phil Mack		(substituted off) 56'
N8	8	Tyler Ardron (c)		(substituted off) 56'	(substituted in) 75'
OF	7	Matt Heaton
BF	6	Lucas Rumball
RL	5	Kyle Baillie		(substituted off) 13'
LL	4	Evan Olmstead
TP	3	Jake Ilnicki		(substituted off) 40'
HK	2	Andrew Quattrin		(substituted off) 56'
LP	1	Hubert Buydens		(substituted off) 40'
Replacements:
HK	16	Benoît Piffero		(substituted in) 56'
PR	17	Djustice Sears-Duru		(substituted in) 40'
PR	18	Matt Tierney		(substituted in) 40'
LK	19	Josh Larsen	(red card) 36'	(substituted in) 13'
LK	20	Mike Sheppard		(substituted in) 56'	(substituted off) 75'
SH	21	Jamie Mackenzie		(substituted in) 56'
FH	22	Shane O'Leary		(substituted in) 63'
CE	23	Giuseppe du Toit		(substituted in) 75'
Coach:
(Wales) Kingsley Jones

Player of the Match:
RG Snyman (South Africa)

Assistant referees:
Angus Gardner (Australia)
Andrew Brace (Ireland)
Television match official:
Rowan Kitt (England)

Notes:

- Cobus Reinach (South Africa) scored the fastest hat-trick in a World Cup match, with just 11 minutes between his first and third tries.

=== New Zealand vs Italy ===
12 October 2019
13:45 JST (UTC+09)

New Zealand	0–0 (Cancelled)	Italy

City of Toyota Stadium, Toyota
Referee: Luke Pearce (England)

Assistant referees:
Wayne Barnes (England)
Alexandre Ruiz (France)
Television match official:
Graham Hughes (England)

Notes:

- As a result of inclement weather caused by Typhoon Hagibis this match was cancelled and awarded as a 0–0 draw.

=== Namibia vs Canada ===
13 October 2019
12:15 JST (UTC+09)

Namibia	0–0 (Cancelled)	Canada

Kamaishi Recovery Memorial Stadium, Kamaishi
Referee: Paul Williams (New Zealand)

Namibia	Canada

FB	15	Johann Tromp
RW	14	Lesley Klim
OC	13	Johan Deysel (c)
IC	12	Darryl de la Harpe
LW	11	J. C. Greyling
FH	10	Cliven Loubser
SH	9	Eugene Jantjies
N8	8	Janco Venter
OF	7	Wian Conradie
BF	6	Prince ǃGaoseb
RL	5	Tjiuee Uanivi
LL	4	Johan Retief
TP	3	Aranos Coetzee
HK	2	Torsten van Jaarsveld
LP	1	André Rademeyer
Replacements:
HK	16	Louis van der Westhuizen
PR	17	A. J. de Klerk
PR	18	Des Sethie
LK	19	Max Katjijeko
FL	20	Rohan Kitshoff
SH	21	Damian Stevens
FH	22	TC Kisting
FB	23	Chad Plato
Coach:
(Wales) Phil Davies

FB	15	Pat Parfrey
RW	14	Jeff Hassler
OC	13	Conor Trainor
IC	12	Ciaran Hearn
LW	11	D. T. H. van der Merwe
FH	10	Peter Nelson
SH	9	Gordon McRorie
N8	8	Tyler Ardron (c)
OF	7	Matt Heaton
BF	6	Lucas Rumball
RL	5	Conor Keys
LL	4	Evan Olmstead
TP	3	Jake Ilnicki
HK	2	Eric Howard
LP	1	Djustice Sears-Duru
Replacements:
HK	16	Andrew Quattrin
PR	17	Hubert Buydens
PR	18	Matt Tierney
N8	19	Luke Campbell
FL	20	Dustin Dobravsky
SH	21	Jamie Mackenzie
FH	22	Shane O'Leary
FB	23	Andrew Coe
Coach:
(Wales) Kingsley Jones

Assistant referees:
Jaco Peyper (South Africa)
Federico Anselmi (Argentina)
Television match official:
Ben Skeen (New Zealand)

Notes:

- Despite both teams naming their sides, this match was cancelled following an evacuation order in Kamaishi during Typhoon Hagibis and awarded as a 0–0 draw.
