= PJ Walters (rugby union) =

Namibian rugby union player (born 1993)

- Born: 23 April 1993 (age 33)
- Height: 1.87 m (6 ft 2 in)
- Weight: 105 kg (231 lb)

Rugby union career
- Position: Wing
- Current team: Welwitschias
- Correct as of 22 September 2019
International career
Years	Team	Apps	(Points)
2019–present	Namibia	1	(0)
- Correct as of 22 September 2019

PJ Walters (born 23 April 1993) is a Namibian rugby union player who generally plays as a wing represents Namibia internationally and currently plays for Namibian club Welwitschias. He was included in the Namibian squad as the only uncapped player in the side for the 2019 Rugby World Cup which is held in Japan for the first time and also marks his first World Cup appearance. He made his international debut at the 2019 Rugby World Cup.

== Career ==
He made his international debut for Namibia in Namibia's opening match of the 2019 Rugby World Cup against Italy. He made it into the team as an injury replacement to Lesley Klim from the start of the match and was part of the losing side being thrashed by Italy 47-22 which also saw Namibia's 20th consecutive defeat at the World Cup.
