= Frans Malherbe =

South African rugby union footballer

- Full name: Jozua Francois Malherbe
- Born: 14 March 1991 (age 35) Bredasdorp, South Africa
- Height: 1.90 m (6 ft 3 in)
- Weight: 144 kg (317 lb; 22 st 9 lb)
- School: Paarl Boys' High School

Rugby union career
- Position: Tighthead prop
- Current team: Stormers / Western Province
Youth career
- 2007–2012: Western Province
Senior career
Years	Team	Apps	(Points)
2011–present	Western Province	41	(5)
2011–present	Stormers	152	(25)
- Correct as of 22 March 2025
International career
Years	Team	Apps	(Points)
2013–present	South Africa	76	(5)
- Correct as of 26 October 2024
Medal record
Men's Rugby union
Representing South Africa
Rugby World Cup
Bronze medal – third place	2015 England	Squad
Gold medal – first place	2019 Japan	Squad
Gold medal – first place	2023 France	Squad

Jozua Francois Malherbe (born 14 March 1991) is a South African professional rugby union player. He plays as a tighthead prop for the Stormers in the United Rugby Championship and South Africa national team.

== Early life ==
Malherbe attended Paarl Boys' High School, where he also captained the First Rugby team to victory in Interschools in his Matric year.

== Career ==
Malherbe made both his senior Western Province and Stormers debuts in 2011, however it was the following year when he fully cemented his place in both sides. He played in every Stormers match during the 2012 Super Rugby season and only missed one match in Western Province's successful 2012 Currie Cup Premier Division campaign when he provided injury cover for South Africa squad on their tour of Australasia. He was a starter as Province upset the Sharks 25–18 in Durban to become a Currie Cup winner at the age of 21.

2013 saw his reputation grow and he retained his position as the Stormers first-choice tighthead ahead of the more experienced Pat Cilliers who had joined the franchise from the Lions. He made 11 appearances during the 2013 Super Rugby season before an injury ended his campaign and forced him to miss the majority of the 2013 Currie Cup season. He made his comeback towards the back end of the campaign making 4 appearances from the bench and helping Province reach their second successive Currie Cup final.

== International ==
Malherbe had been involved in several South Africa squads since the appointment of Heyneke Meyer as head coach in 2012 without making any appearances. An injury to Jannie du Plessis meant he finally made his test debut on 9 November 2013 against Wales in Cardiff. He acquitted himself well despite facing the hugely experienced Gethin Jenkins on the other side of the scrum. He retained his place for the following week's match against Scotland in Edinburgh, however an injury just before half time saw him withdrawn and his tour ended prematurely.

Malherbe was named in South Africa's squad for the 2019 Rugby World Cup. He also scored his first Test try in his career at his appearance off the bench on the final Springbok pool match against Canada. South Africa went on to win the tournament, defeating England in the final.

== Honours ==
Western Province

- 2012 Currie Cup winner

Stormers

- 2022 United Rugby Championship winner

South Africa

- 2019 Rugby Championship winner
- 2019 Rugby World Cup winner
- 2021 British & Irish Lions tour to South Africa winner
- 2023 Rugby World Cup winner
- 2024 Rugby Championship winner

== Statistics ==
=== Test match record ===
As of 24 May 2025

Opponent	P	W	D	L	Try	Pts	%Won
Argentina	12	11	0	1	0	0	91.67
Australia	9	4	0	5	0	0	44.44
British & Irish Lions	3	2	0	1	0	0	66.67
Canada	1	1	0	0	1	5	100
England	6	4	0	2	0	0	66.67
France	5	4	0	1	0	0	80
Georgia	1	1	0	0	0	0	100
Ireland	7	3	0	4	0	0	42.86
Italy	2	2	0	0	0	0	100
Japan	2	2	0	0	0	0	100
New Zealand	13	6	1	6	0	0	46.15
Romania	1	1	0	0	0	0	100
Samoa	1	1	0	0	0	0	100
Scotland	4	4	0	0	0	0	100
United States	1	1	0	0	0	0	100
Wales	8	7	0	1	0	0	87.5
Total	76	54	1	21	1	5	71.05

=== International tries ===
As of 24 May 2025

Try	Opposing team	Location	Venue	Competition	Date	Result	Score
1	Canada	Kobe, Japan	Kobe Misaki Stadium	2019 Rugby World Cup	8 October 2019	Win	66–7

== Super Rugby Statistics ==
As of 15 June 2020

Season	Team	Games	Starts	Sub	Mins	Tries	Points	Yellow card	Red card
2011	Stormers	4	0	4	52	0	0	0	0
2012	Stormers	17	6	11	693	0	0	1	0
2013	Stormers	11	8	3	548	0	0	0	0
2014	Stormers	10	9	1	607	2	10	0	0
2015	Stormers	13	8	5	595	0	0	0	0
2016	Stormers	12	7	5	602	0	0	0	0
2017	Stormers	13	9	4	664	0	0	0	0
2018	Stormers	6	1	5	125	0	0	0	0
2019	Stormers	12	9	3	623	0	0	0	0
2020	Stormers	6	4	2	301	0	0	1	0
Total		104	61	43	4796	2	10	2	0
