= Joaquín Jaunsolo =

Uruguayan rugby union player

- Born: 12 September 1998 (age 28) Montevideo, Uruguay
- Height: 1.83 m (6 ft 0 in)
- Weight: 102 kg (225 lb)

Rugby union career
- Position: Prop
- Current team: Peñarol
Senior career
Years	Team	Apps	(Points)
2020−	Peñarol		
- Correct as of 5 October 2019
International career
Years	Team	Apps	(Points)
2019	Uruguay Under 20	4	(0)
2019–present	Uruguay	2	(0)
- Correct as of 5 October 2019

Joaquín Jaunsolo (born 12 September 1998) is an Uruguay rugby union player who generally plays as a prop represents Uruguay internationally. He was included in the Uruguayan squad for the 2019 Rugby World Cup which was held in Japan for the first time and also marked his first World Cup appearance.

== Career ==
He made his international debut for Uruguay against Argentina XV on 23 February 2019.
