= Luke Campbell (rugby union, born 1992) =

Canadian rugby union player

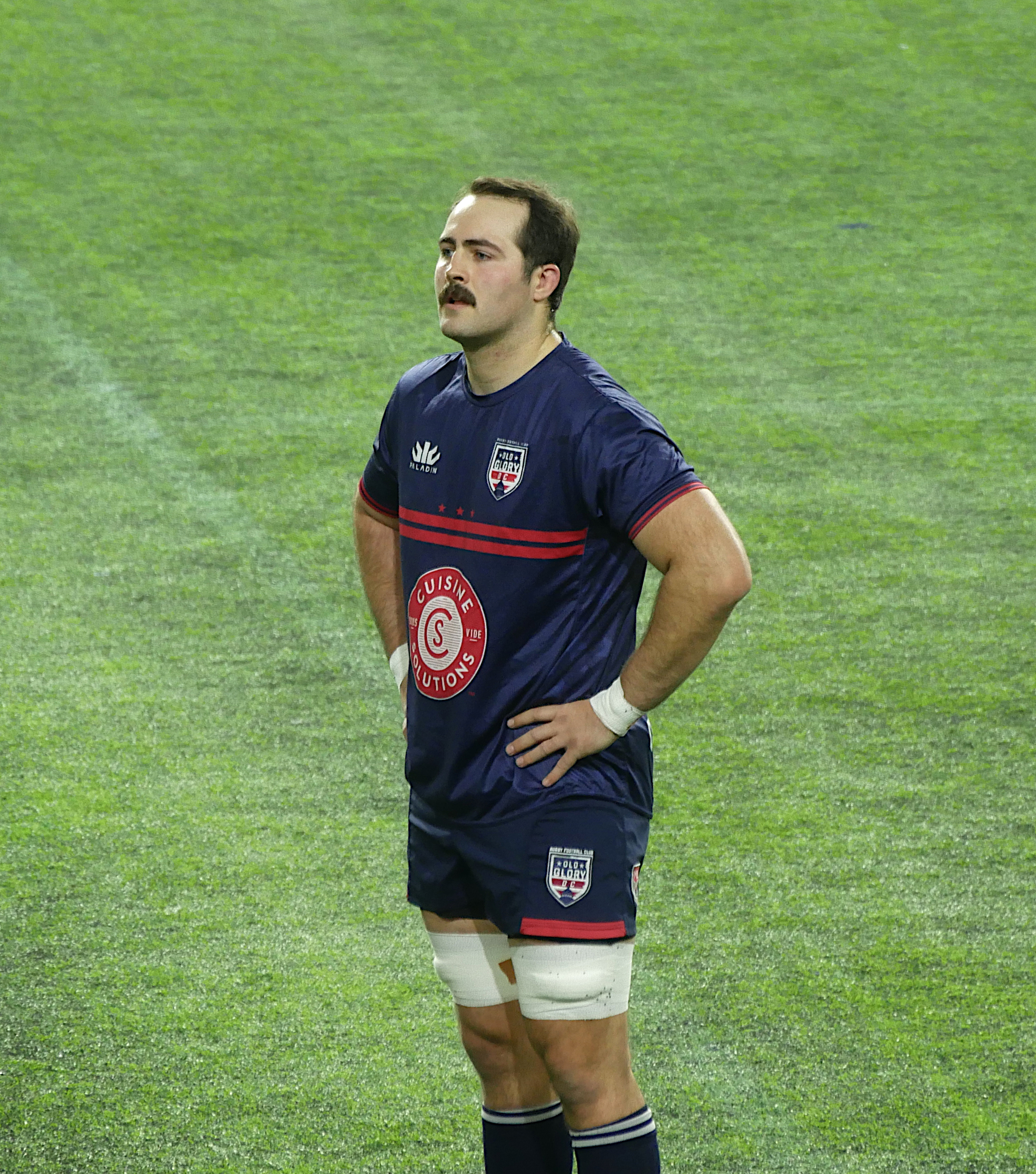
- Luke Campbell with Old Glory DC in 2022
- Born: October 2, 1992 (age 34) Victoria, British Columbia
- Height: 1.90 m (6 ft 3 in)
- Weight: 110 kg (243 lb)
- School: Reynolds Secondary School
- University: University of Victoria

Rugby union career
- Position: No. 8
Amateur team(s)
Years	Team	Apps	(Points)
2015-	James Bay AA		
Senior career
Years	Team	Apps	(Points)
2019–2020	Toronto Arrows	4	(5)
2021–	Old Glory DC	14	(5)
Provincial / State sides
Years	Team	Apps	(Points)
2016-	BC Bears		
International career
Years	Team	Apps	(Points)
2012	Canada u20s		
2017	Canada Selects		
2018–	Canada	13	(20)

Luke Francis Campbell (born 2 October 1992) is a Canadian rugby union player who generally plays as a number eight represents Canada internationally and also currently plays for Old Glory DC of Major League Rugby (MLR).

He previously played for Canadian club Toronto Arrows in the MLR.

He was included in the Canadian squad for the 2019 Rugby World Cup which is held in Japan for the first time and also marks his first World Cup appearance.

== Career ==
He made his international debut for Canada against United States on 10 February 2018. He made his first World Cup match appearance against Italy on 26 September 2019 in Canada's opening match of the tournament in Pool B. The match ended up in a losing cause for Canada, where Italy thrashed them in a one sided contest by scoring 48–7.
