= Matt Heaton =

Canadian rugby union player

- Full name: Matthew Josef Heaton
- Born: 9 February 1993 (age 33) Godmanchester, Quebec
- Height: 6 ft 2 in (1.88 m)
- Weight: 220 lb (100 kg)

Rugby union career
- Position: Flanker
- Current team: Rugby ATL
Amateur team(s)
Years	Team	Apps	(Points)
2015-2017	Otley		
2017-2019	Darlington Mowden Park		
Senior career
Years	Team	Apps	(Points)
2020-	Rugby ATL	7	(5)
- Correct as of 12 April 2021
Provincial / State sides
Years	Team	Apps	(Points)
2016-	The Rock		
International career
Years	Team	Apps	(Points)
2016-	Canada	28	(5)
- Correct as of 12 April 2021

Matt Heaton (born 9 February 1993) is a Canadian rugby union player who plays as a flanker for Rugby ATL in Major League Rugby (MLR). He also represents Canada playing for the Canadian national rugby union team internationally.

He was included in the Canadian squad for the 2019 Rugby World Cup which was held in Japan for the first time and which was his first World Cup appearance.

Heaton is a 2 time recipient of the Rugby Canada 15's Player of the year award. (2017 & 2019)

== Early life ==
Heaton was born in Godmanchester, Quebec. He first played rugby at age 14 and represented his high school Chateauguay Valley Regional. He later attended John Abbot College. Heaton’s first club was Ormstown Saracens RFC.

== Career ==
He first played representative rugby for Quebec under 17s and under 18s before playing for Canada Under 20s. He represented Newfoundland at the Canadian Rugby Championships in 2014 and 2015

He moved to the UK and completed 4 seasons in the amateur leagues with Otley and Darlington Mowden.

He made his international debut for Canada against Japan on 11 June 2016. He made his first World Cup match appearance against Italy on 26 September 2019, as a substitute, in Canada's opening match of the tournament in Pool B. Heaton put in a 14 tackle performance on 2 October 2019, as a starter, vs New Zealand in Canada's second RWC pool match. Heaton scored his first international try on 8 October 2019, as a starter, vs South Africa in Canada's third RWC pool match.

In 2020 Heaton moved to US Major League Rugby expansion team Rugby ATL and earned 3 appearances before the season was called off due to the COVID-19 pandemic. He was named team co-captain for the 2021 season.

== Club statistics ==
As of 1 March 2020

Season	Team	Games	Starts	Sub	Tries	Cons	Pens	Drops	Points	Yel	Red
MLR 2020	Rugby ATL	3	3	0	1	0	0	0	5	0	0
MLR 2021	Rugby ATL	4	4	0	0	0	0	0	0	0	0
Total		7	7	0	1	0	0	0	5	0	0
