= Warrick Gelant =

South African rugby union player

- Full name: Warrick Wayne Gelant
- Born: 20 May 1995 (age 31) Knysna, Western Cape, South Africa
- Height: 1.78 m (5 ft 10 in)
- Weight: 89 kg (14 st 0 lb; 196 lb)
- School: Hoërskool Outeniqua, George
- University: University of Pretoria

Rugby union career
- Position: Fullback / Wing / Centre
- Current team: Stormers
Youth career
- 2008–2013: SWD Eagles
- 2014–2015: Blue Bulls
Amateur team(s)
Years	Team	Apps	(Points)
2014	UP Tuks	7	(13)
Senior career
Years	Team	Apps	(Points)
2015–2017	Blue Bulls	25	(68)
2016	Blue Bulls XV	1	(0)
2016–2020	Bulls	52	(90)
2020–2022	Stormers	23	(38)
2020–2022	Western Province	5	(0)
2022–2023	Racing 92	18	(0)
2023–Present	Stormers	27	(55)
- Correct as of 23 July 2022
International career
Years	Team	Apps	(Points)
2012–2013	South Africa Schools	6	(0)
2014–2015	South Africa Under-20	10	(10)
2014–2015	South Africa Sevens	16	(40)
2017	South Africa 'A'	1	(10)
2017–present	South Africa	10	(15)
- Correct as of 23 July 2022
Medal record
Men's Rugby union
Representing South Africa
Rugby World Cup
Gold medal – first place	2019 Japan	Squad

Warrick Wayne Gelant (born 20 May 1995) is a South African professional rugby union player who currently plays for the South Africa national team and Stormers in the United Rugby Championship. His regular position is fullback, He was a member of the winning Springboks at the 2019 Rugby World Cup in Japan.

== Career ==
=== 2008–13 ===
Gelant came to the attention of provincial selectors as early as primary school level, when he was selected to represent SWD at the Under-13 Craven Week tournament in 2008. He continued his progression by being selected for the Under-16 side that played at the 2011 Grant Khomo Week competition. Even though he was in the Under-17 age group, he represented SWD at the 2012 Under-18 Craven Week competition and his performances there also ensured he was selected in the 2012 South African Schools team. He represented them in matches against France, Wales and England, playing as both a fullback and a centre. He missed out on Craven Week selection in 2013 when he picked up an injury shortly before the tournament, but this did not prevent him for again being selected for the South African Schools side. He once again appeared in all three of their matches, held against the same opposition: England, France and Wales.

=== 2014 ===
When Gelant finished high school, Gelant moved to Pretoria to join the Blue Bulls. He was included in their squad for the 2014 Vodacom Cup, but failed to be involved in that competition. Instead, he played some rugby for university side UP Tuks in the 2014 Varsity Cup competition, starting all seven of their matches in the competition.

Gelant was then included in the South Africa Under-20 squad that participated in the 2014 IRB Junior World Championship held in New Zealand. He started their opening match against Scotland, scoring a second-half try to help South Africa to a 61–5 victory Four days later, he started another match for the Under-20s in a 33–24 victory against hosts and four-time winners New Zealand, with Gelant once again scoring one of South Africa's tries. He played off the bench for their final pool match, a 21–8 victory over Samoa as South Africa finished top of the group to set up a rematch with New Zealand in the semi-finals. Gelant started the semi-final and helped South Africa secure their fourth consecutive victory over New Zealand at this level, winning 32–25. He made his fifth appearance – and fourth start – of the tournament in the final, but could not prevent South Africa finishing on the losing side this time, with England winning the championship for the second consecutive year with a 21–20 victory over South Africa.

Gelant returned to domestic action after the Junior World Championship, making five appearances for the Blue Bulls U19s during the 2014 Under-19 Provincial Championship, scoring a try in the final of the competition against Western Province U19, which wasn't enough to prevent his side suffering a 26–33 loss in Cape Town.

At the end of 2014, Gelant was called up to the South African Sevens side for their 2014–15 Sevens World Series campaign. He had a memorable start to his sevens career South Africa winning both of the first two tournaments that he played in – the 2014 Dubai Sevens and the 2014 South Africa Sevens.

=== 2015 ===
Gelant was also included in the Bulls' squad for the 2015 Super Rugby season, although his sevens commitments ruled him out of the start of the campaign.

In March 2015, Gelant was named in an extended South Africa Under-20 training group as part of their preparation for the 2015 World Rugby Under 20 Championship. He featured for them in a friendly match against a Varsity Cup Dream Team in April 2015. He was also included in the South Africa Under-20 squad that toured Argentina in May 2015, making an appearance off the bench in the first match.

Upon the team's return, Gelant was named in the final squad for the 2015 World Rugby Under 20 Championship. He started all three of their matches in Pool B of the competition; a 33–5 win against hosts Italy, a 40–8 win against Samoa and a 46–13 win over Australia to help South Africa finish top of Pool B to qualify for the semi-finals with the best record pool stage of all the teams in the competition. Gelant started their semi-final match against England, but could not prevent them losing 20–28 to be eliminated from the competition by England for the second year in succession and also started their third-place play-off match against France, helping South Africa to a 31–18 win to secure third place in the competition.

=== 2019 Rugby World Cup ===
Gelant was named in South Africa's squad for the 2019 Rugby World Cup. South Africa went on to win the tournament, defeating England in the final.

== Statistics ==
=== Test match record ===
As of 4 July 2026

Opponent	P	W	D	L	Try	Pts	%Won
Argentina	1	1	0	0	0	0	100
Australia	2	1	0	1	0	0	50
Canada	1	1	0	0	1	5	100
England	2	1	0	1	0	0	50
Italy	1	1	0	0	0	0	100
Namibia	1	1	0	0	1	5	100
Wales	3	0	0	3	1	5	0
Total	11	6	0	5	3	15	54.55

=== International tries ===
As of 4 July 2026

Try	Opposing team	Location	Venue	Competition	Date	Result	Score
1	Wales	Cardiff, Wales	Millennium Stadium	2017 end-of-year rugby union internationals	2 December 2017	Loss	24–22
2	Namibia	Toyota, Japan	City of Toyota Stadium	2019 Rugby World Cup	28 September 2019	Win	57–3
3	Canada	Kobe, Japan	Noevir Stadium Kobe	2019 Rugby World Cup	8 October 2019	Win	66–7
