= Conor Keys =

Canada international rugby union player (born 1996)

- Full name: Conor Harris Keys
- Born: 9 July 1996 (age 30) Stittsville, Ontario
- Height: 6 ft 6 in (1.98 m)
- Weight: 260 lb (120 kg)

Rugby union career
- Position: Lock
- Current team: New England Free Jacks
Senior career
Years	Team	Apps	(Points)
2017–2019	Rotherham Titans		
2020–2022	Rugby ATL	36	
2023–	New England Free Jacks	44	
- Correct as of 18 March 2023
Provincial / State sides
Years	Team	Apps	(Points)
2016–	The Rock		
International career
Years	Team	Apps	(Points)
2016–	Canada	28	(0)
- Correct as of 26 September 2019

Conor Keys (born 9 July 1996) is a Canadian rugby union player who generally plays as a lock represents Canada internationally. He currently plays for New England Free Jacks of Major League Rugby (MLR) in the United States.

He was included in the Canadian squad for the 2019 Rugby World Cup which is held in Japan for the first time and also marks his first World Cup appearance.

== Early life ==
A native of Stittsville Keys was first exposed to the game of rugby by his father, who started playing after immigrating to Canada from the UK. Keys’ dad took him to his first game at the 2006 Churchill Cup, this led to keys deciding to sign up and start playing. Keys also played for the Sacred Heart Catholic High School Huskies and eventually the Eastern Ontario Rugby Union team.

== Career ==
Keys would play 2 seasons with the Rotherham Titans from 2017-2019

Keys would then move to the United States to play for rugby Atlanta for 2 years making 36 appearances.

He would then be traded to the New England Free jacks in 2023. Being a key part in the team winning 3 straight championships with the club.

International career

While attending and playing for the University of Victoria, Keys was called up to the national U20 side and earned his first caps for men’s Canada’s men’s XV’s.

He made his international debut for Canada national team against Chile on 11 February 2017. He made his first World Cup match appearance against Italy on 26 September 2019 in Canada's opening match of the tournament in Pool B. The match ended up in a losing cause for Canada, 48–7.

== Career statistics ==
As of 1 March 2020

Season	Team	Games	Starts	Sub	Tries	Cons	Pens	Drops	Points	Yel	Red
MLR 2020	Rugby ATL	4	2	2	0	0	0	0	0	0	0
Total		4	2	2	0	0	0	0	0	0	0

== Honours ==
New England Free Jacks

- Major League Rugby Championship: 3x (2023, 2024, 2025)

== Personal life ==
Outside of rugby, Keys also enjoys playing ice hockey, and is a talented musician.

Keys is also a Mortgage Agent.
