= Chad Plato =

Namibia international rugby union player

- Full name: Chad Zavier Plato
- Born: 21 April 1998 (age 28) Swakopmund, Namibia
- Height: 1.78 m (5 ft 10 in)
- Weight: 78 kg (172 lb)

Rugby union career
- Position: Wing
- Current team: Kudus (Rugby)
- Correct as of 22 September 2019
International career
Years	Team	Apps	(Points)
2018–present	Namibia	6	(5)
- Correct as of 22 September 2019

Chad Zavier Plato (born 21 April 1998) is a Namibian rugby union player who generally plays as a fullback or wing and represents Namibia internationally. He was included in the Namibian squad for the 2019 Rugby World Cup which is held in Japan for the first time and also marks his first World Cup appearance.

== Career ==
He made his international debut for Namibia against Spain on 17 November 2018. He made his first World Cup match appearance in Namibia's opening match of the 2019 Rugby World Cup against Italy in Pool B. He scored a try during the match in a losing cause where Namibia were defeated by Italy 47-22 which also marked Namibia's 20th consecutive defeat at the World Cup.
