= Takuya Kitade =

Japanese rugby union player (born 1992)

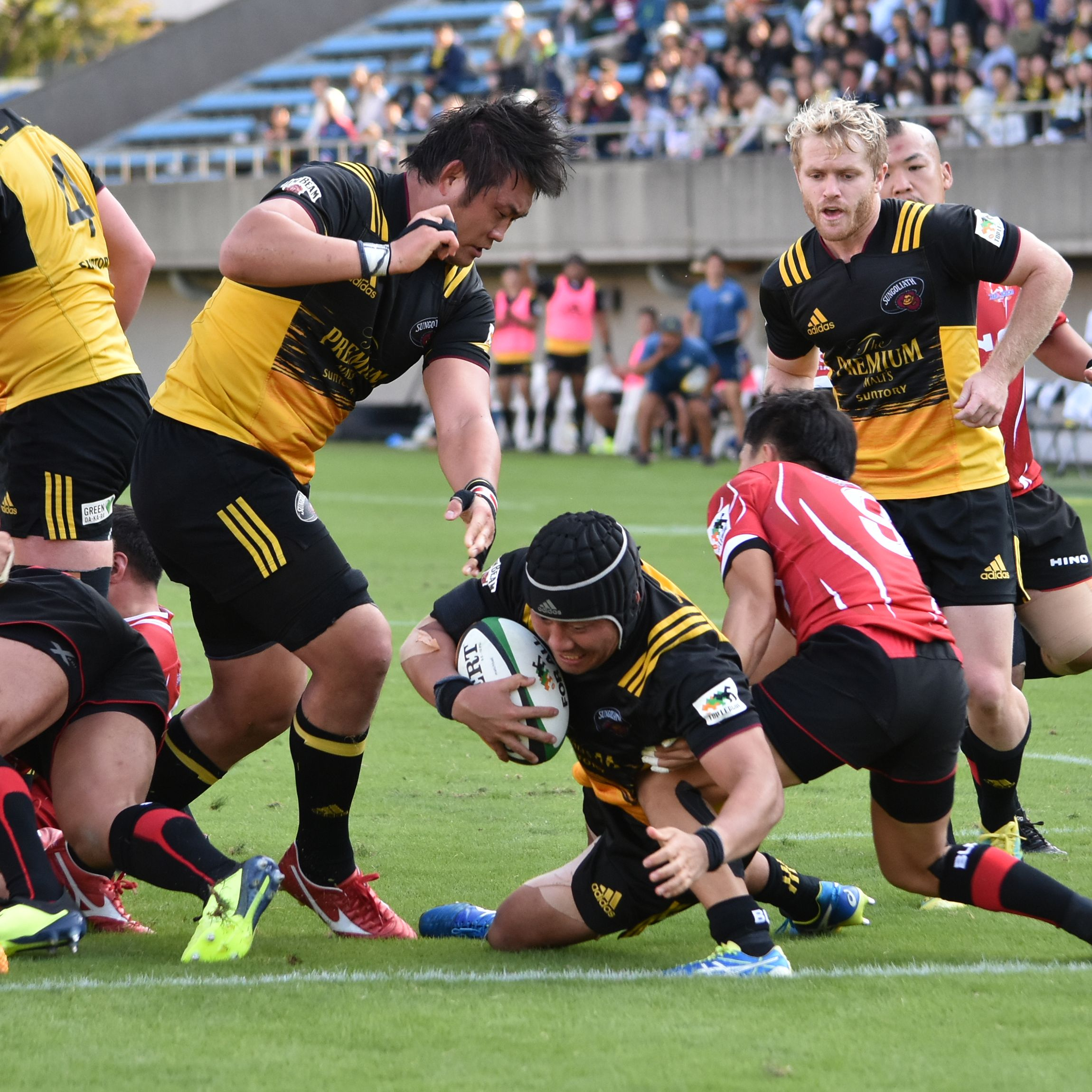
- Full name: Takuya Kitade
- Born: 14 September 1992 (age 34) Kyoto, Japan
- Height: 1.80 m (5 ft 11 in)
- Weight: 101 kg (15 st 13 lb; 223 lb)

Rugby union career
- Position: Hooker
- Current team: Kobelco Steelers
Senior career
Years	Team	Apps	(Points)
2015–2022	Suntory Sungoliath	52	(40)
2019	Sunwolves	1	(0)
2022-	Kobelco Steelers	39	(40)
- Correct as of 21 February 2021
International career
Years	Team	Apps	(Points)
2019–	Japan	1	((0))
- Correct as of 15 September 2019

Takuya Kitade (北出卓也, Kitade Takuya; born 14 September 1992) is a Japanese rugby union player who plays as a Hooker. He currently plays for Kobelco Kobe Steelers in Japan's domestic Top League.
