= Janry du Toit =

Namibian rugby union player

- Born: 26 August 1996 (age 30) Aranos, Namibia

Rugby union career
- Position: centre
- Current team: Peñarol
Senior career
Years	Team	Apps	(Points)
2017−2019	Welwitschias	12	(10)
2020−	Peñarol		
- Correct as of 8 October 2019
International career
Years	Team	Apps	(Points)
2018–present	Namibia	3	(0)
- Correct as of 8 October 2019

Janry du Toit (born 26 August 1996) is a Namibian rugby union player who generally plays as a centre represents Namibia internationally. He was included in the Namibian squad for the 2019 Rugby World Cup which is held in Japan for the first time and also marks his first World Cup appearance.

== Career ==
He made his international debut for Namibia against Russia on 10 November 2018.
