= Darryl de la Harpe =

Namibian rugby union player

- Full name: Darryl Pierce de la Harpe
- Born: 10 February 1986 (age 40) Windhoek, South West Africa
- Height: 1.87 m (6 ft 1 1/2 in)
- Weight: 98 kg (216 lb; 15 st 6 lb)
- School: Windhoek High School

Rugby union career
- Position: Centre
- Current team: Welwitschias
Senior career
Years	Team	Apps	(Points)
2009	Falcons	3	(5)
2010–2011	Welwitschias	15	(5)
2013	Farul Constanța	4	(0)
2015–present	Welwitschias	29	(30)
- Correct as of 22 July 2018
International career
Years	Team	Apps	(Points)
2010–present	Namibia	49	(50)
- Correct as of 14 September 2019

Darryl Pierce de la Harpe (born 10 February 1986) is a Namibian rugby union player. He was named in Namibia's squad for the 2015 Rugby World Cup.
