= Nicola Quaglio =

Italy international rugby union player

- Born: 9 March 1991 (age 35) Rovigo
- Height: 1.85 m (6 ft 1 in)
- Weight: 111 kg (17 st 7 lb; 245 lb)

Rugby union career
- Position: Prop
Youth career
- Rovigo Delta
Senior career
Years	Team	Apps	(Points)
2009−2016	Rovigo Delta	115	(30)
2016−2021	Benetton Rugby	63	(5)
2021–2024	Rovigo Delta	40	(0)
- Correct as of 10 Apr 2021
International career
Years	Team	Apps	(Points)
2011	Italy Under 20	10	
2016−2019	Italy	14	(0)
- Correct as of 18 Sep 2019

Nicola Quaglio (born 9 March 1991) was an Italian rugby union player. His usual position was as a Prop.

Quaglio played with Italian Pro14 team Benetton from 2016 to 2021. He played for Italian Top10 team Rovigo Delta until 2016 and from 2021 to 2024.

In 2011, Quaglio was named in the Italy Under 20 squad and from 2016 he was also named in the Italy squad. On 18 August 2019, he was named in the final 31-man squad for the 2019 Rugby World Cup. He represented Italy on 14 occasions.
