= TC Kisting =

Namibian rugby union player

- Full name: Helarius Axasman Kisting
- Born: 13 January 1994 (age 32)
- Height: 1.75 m (5 ft 9 in)
- Weight: 80 kg (180 lb; 12 st 8 lb)

Rugby union career
- Position: Scrum-half / Fly-half
- Current team: Dinamo București
Senior career
| Years | Team | Apps | (Points) |
| 2017–2019 | Welwitschias | 11 | (7) |
| 2019–2021 | CSM Știința Baia Mare | 15 | (52) |
| 2022– | Dinamo București | 4 | (5) |
- Correct as of 22 July 2018
International career
| Years | Team | Apps | (Points) |
| 2017 | Namibia | 8 | (14) |
- Correct as of 14 September 2019

Helarius Axasman 'TC' Kisting (born 13 January 1994) is a Namibian rugby union player for Dinamo București. Before moving to the Romanian Liga Națională de Rugby, he played for the Welwitschias in the Currie Cup and the Rugby Challenge. His regular position is scrum-half or fly-half.

== Rugby career ==
Kisting made his test debut for Namibia in 2017 against Tunisia and represented the Welwitschias in the South African domestic Currie Cup and Rugby Challenge since 2017.

In 2019 he signed the Romanian CSM Știința Baia Mare, where he won the Liga Națională de Rugby in 2020 and 2021. In 2022 Kisting moved to Dinamo București.
