= Justin Newman =

Namibia international rugby union player

- Full name: Justin Thomas Newman
- Born: 17 February 1995 (age 31) Windhoek, Namibia
- Height: 1.80 m (5 ft 11 in)
- Weight: 90 kg (200 lb; 14 st 2 lb)
- School: Windhoek Gymnasium

Rugby union career
- Position: Centre / Wing
Youth career
- 2014–2016: Sharks
Senior career
Years	Team	Apps	(Points)
2017–2018	Leopards	9	(10)
- Correct as of 22 July 2018
International career
Years	Team	Apps	(Points)
2017–present	Namibia	14	(25)
- Correct as of 14 September 2019

Justin Thomas Newman (born 17 February 1995) is a Namibian rugby union player for the Namibian national team and for the Welwitschias in the Rugby Challenge. His regular position is centre or wing.

== Rugby career ==
He made his test debut for Namibia in 2017 against Russia and represented the Leopards in the South African domestic Currie Cup and Rugby Challenge since 2017.
