= André Rademeyer =

Namibia international rugby union player

- Full name: André Pretorius Rademeyer
- Born: 24 June 1998 (age 28) Windhoek, Namibia
- Height: 1.82 m (5 ft 11 1/2 in)
- Weight: 100 kg (220 lb; 15 st 10 lb)
- School: Windhoek Afrikaanse Privaatskool

Rugby union career
- Position: Prop
- Current team: Western Province
International career
Years	Team	Apps	(Points)
2018–present	Namibia	3	(0)
- Correct as of 14 September 2019

André Pretorius Rademeyer (born 24 June 1998) is a Namibian rugby union player for the Namibian national team. His regular position is prop.

== Rugby career ==
Rademeyer was born in Windhoek. He made his test debut for Namibia in 2018 against Uganda.
