= Nelius Theron =

Namibia international rugby union player

- Born: 29 January 1997 (age 29) Windhoek, Namibia
- Height: 1.86 m (6 ft 1 in)
- Weight: 111 kg (245 lb; 17 st 7 lb)
- School: Tsumeb Gymnasium
- Notable relative(s): Andre Theron [father], Janette Theron [mother]

Rugby union career
- Position: Prop
- Current team: Leopards
Senior career
Years	Team	Apps	(Points)
2017	Welwitschias	4	(0)
2018–2021	Leopards	14	(0)
- Correct as of 27 March 2022
International career
Years	Team	Apps	(Points)
2017–present	Namibia	7	(0)
- Correct as of 27 March 2022

Nelius Theron (born 29 January 1997) is a Namibian rugby union player for the Namibian national team and for the Leopards in the Currie Cup and the Rugby Challenge. His regular position is prop.

== Rugby career ==
Theron was born in Windhoek. He made his test debut for Namibia in 2017 against Uruguay and represented the Welwitschias in the South African domestic Currie Cup and Rugby Challenge in 2017 before moving to Potchefstroom to join the Leopards for 2018.
