= Thomasau Forbes =

Namibia international rugby union player

- Full name: Thomasau Roberto Forbes
- Born: 12 October 1988 (age 38) Swakopmund, South West Africa
- Height: 1.78 m (5 ft 10 in)
- Weight: 95 kg (209 lb; 14 st 13 lb)
- School: Namib High School
- University: Nelson Mandela Metropolitan University

Rugby union career
- Position: Flanker
- Current team: Welwitschias
Youth career
- 2007–2009: Griquas
Senior career
Years	Team	Apps	(Points)
2015–present	Welwitschias	24	(5)
- Correct as of 22 July 2018
International career
Years	Team	Apps	(Points)
2010–2017	Namibia	17	(15)
- Correct as of 14 September 2019

Thomasau Roberto Forbes (born 12 October 1988) is a Namibian rugby union player for the Welwitschias in the Currie Cup and the Rugby Challenge. His regular position is flanker.

== Rugby career ==
Forbes was born in Swakopmund (then in South-West Africa, but part of modern-day Namibia). He made his test debut for Namibia in 2010 against Russia and represented the Welwitschias in the South African domestic Currie Cup and Vodacom Cup since 2015.
