= A. J. de Klerk =

Namibian rugby union player

AJ de Klerk
- Born: Abel Jacobus de Klerk; 9 December 1991 (age 34)
- Height: 1.85 m (6 ft 1 in)
- Weight: 121 kg (19 st 1 lb; 267 lb)

Rugby union career
- Position: Prop
Provincial / State sides
Years	Team	Apps	(Points)
2015–present	Welwitschias	27	(10)
- Correct as of 21 May 2018
International career
Years	Team	Apps	(Points)
2015–present	Namibia	28	(10)
- Correct as of 14 September 2019

Abel Jacobus 'Tjoppie' de Klerk (born 9 December 1991) is a Namibian rugby union player. He was named in Namibia's squad for the 2015 Rugby World Cup and the 2019 Rugby World Cup.
