= Des Sethie =

Namibia international rugby union player

- Full name: Desiderius Fernandas Sethie
- Born: 9 December 1992 (age 33) Walvis Bay, Namibia
- Height: 1.78 m (5 ft 10 in)
- Weight: 115 kg (254 lb; 18 st 2 lb)
- School: Walvis Bay Private School

Rugby union career
- Position: Prop
- Current team: Welwitschias
Senior career
Years	Team	Apps	(Points)
2017–present	Welwitschias	15	(0)
- Correct as of 22 July 2018
International career
Years	Team	Apps	(Points)
2017–present	Namibia	22	(5)
- Correct as of 14 September 2019

Desiderius Fernandas Sethie (born 9 December 1992) is a Namibian rugby union player for the Namibian national team and for the Welwitschias in the Currie Cup and the Rugby Challenge. His regular position is loosehead prop.

== Rugby career ==
Sethie was born in Walvis Bay. He made his test debut for Namibia in 2017 against Tunisia and represented the Welwitschias in the South African domestic Currie Cup and Rugby Challenge since 2017.
