= Obert Nortjé =

Namibia international rugby union player

- Full name: Obert Daniell Nortjé
- Born: 17 April 1997 (age 29) Windhoek, Namibia
- Height: 1.79 m (5 ft 10 1/2 in)
- Weight: 105 kg (231 lb; 16 st 7 lb)

Rugby union career
- Position: Hooker
- Current team: Peñarol
Senior career
Years	Team	Apps	(Points)
2017–2018	Welwitschias	15	(0)
2020−	Peñarol	1	(0)
- Correct as of 22 July 2018
International career
Years	Team	Apps	(Points)
2017–present	Namibia	15	(15)
- Correct as of 14 September 2019

Obert Daniell Nortjé (born 17 April 1997) is a Namibian rugby union player for the Namibian national team and for the Welwitschias in the Currie Cup and the Rugby Challenge. His regular position is hooker.

== Rugby career ==
Nortjé was born in Windhoek. He made his test debut for Namibia in 2017 against Senegal and represented the Welwitschias in the South African domestic Currie Cup and Rugby Challenge since 2017.
