= Evan Olmstead =

Canada international rugby union player (born 1991)

- Born: Evan Olmstead; February 21, 1991 (age 35) North Vancouver, British Columbia
- Height: 1.98 m (6 ft 6 in)
- Weight: 115 kg (254 lb)

Rugby union career
- Position: Lock / Flanker
Amateur team(s)
Years	Team	Apps	(Points)
2012–2015	Parramatta Two Blues	29	(35)
Senior career
Years	Team	Apps	(Points)
2016	London Scottish FC	7	(0)
2016–18	Newcastle Falcons	28	(10)
2018–19	Auckland	12	(0)
2019–	Newcastle Falcons	4	(0)
–	Biarritz Olympique		
- Correct as of 19 May 2019
International career
Years	Team	Apps	(Points)
2011	Canada U20	4	(0)
2015–	Canada	31	(15)
- Correct as of 9 September 2019

Evan Olmstead (born 21 February 1991 in North Vancouver, British Columbia) is a rugby union lock and loose forward who currently plays for Biarritz Olympique in Pro D2 having formerly played with Newcastle Falcons and a victorious Mitre 10 season with Auckland
