= Lesley Klim =

Namibia international rugby union player

- Full name: Lesley David Klim
- Born: 16 January 1995 (age 31) Keetmanshoop, Namibia
- Height: 187 cm (6 ft 2 in)
- Weight: 95 kg (14 st 13 lb; 209 lb)
- School: PK De Villiers Secondary School
- University: University of Namibia

Rugby union career
- Position: Centre / Wing
- Current team: Jersey Reds
Senior career
Years	Team	Apps	(Points)
2015–2017	Welwitschias	23	(85)
2017–2018	Doncaster Knights	9	(20)
2018–2020	Ospreys	2	(0)
2020–present	Jersey Reds		
- Correct as of 20 May 2018
International career
Years	Team	Apps	(Points)
2016–present	Namibia	11	(40)
- Correct as of 14 September 2019

Lesley David Klim (born 16 January 1995) is a Namibian international rugby union player for RFU Championship side Jersey Reds as a centre or wing.

Klim joined the Ospreys in 2018 having previously played for Welwitschias and Doncaster Knights.
