= 2023 Rugby World Cup Pool A =

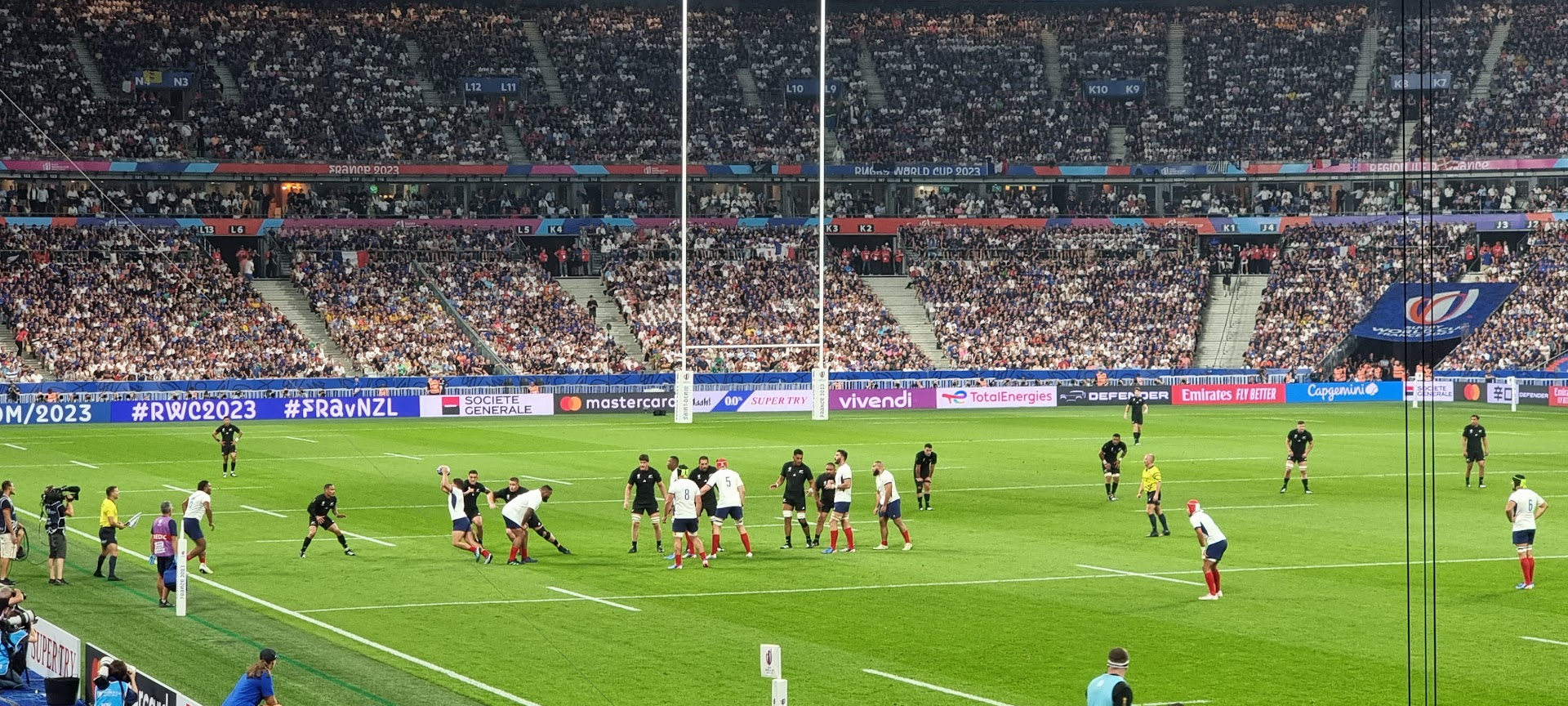
Inaugural 2023 Rugby World Cup match between France and New Zealand at Stade de France.

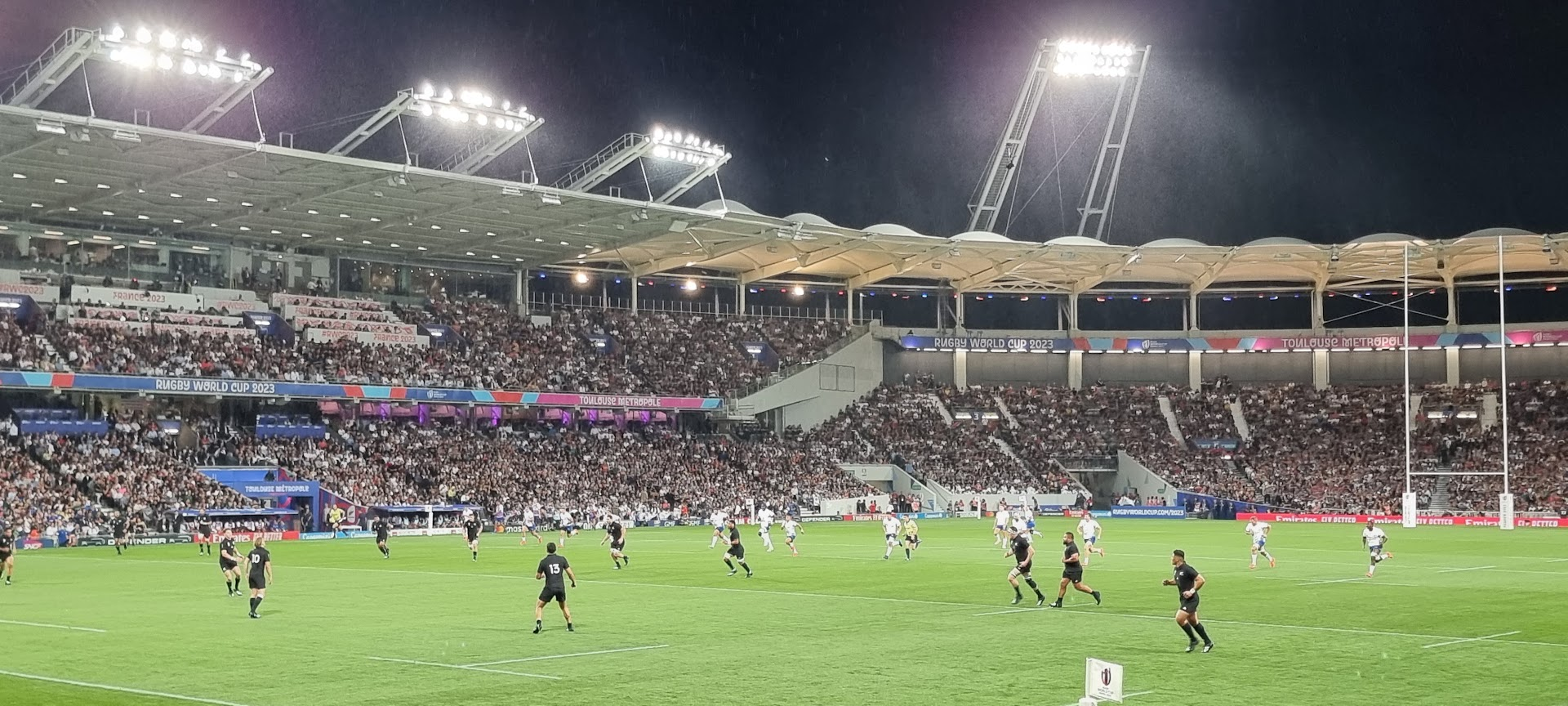
Match between New Zealand and Namibia in Toulouse.

Pool A of the 2023 Rugby World Cup began on 8 September 2023 and concluded on 6 October 2023. The pool included hosts France and previous three-time champions New Zealand, along with Italy, Uruguay and Namibia. Hosts France and New Zealand, whom France had defeated in the opening match, qualified from the pool.

== Teams ==
Pos.	Team	Band	Confederation	Method of qualification	Date of qualification	Apps.	Last	Previous best performance	World Rugby Rankings	
Pos.	Team	Band	Confederation	Method of qualification	Date of qualification	Apps.	Last	Previous best performance	1 January 2020 (Note: The rankings of 1 January 2020 were used for seeding for the final draw.)	4 September 2023
A1	New Zealand	1	Oceania	Top 3 in 2019 RWC pool	6 October 2019	10th	2019	Winners (1987, 2011, 2015)	2	4
A2	France	2	Europe	Hosts	15 November 2017	10th	2019	Runners-up (1987, 1999, 2011)	7	3
A3	Italy	3	Europe	Top 3 in 2019 RWC pool	8 October 2019	10th	2019	Pool stage (1987, 1991, 1995, 1999, 2003, 2007, 2011, 2015, 2019)	12	13
A4	Uruguay	4 (Note: As the identity of the Americas 1 winners was not known at the time of the final draw, positions in the World Rugby Rankings were not taken into account, and the placeholder in the draw was automatically seeded into band 4.)	South America	Americas 1	9 October 2021	5th	2019	Pool stage (1999, 2003, 2015, 2019	18	17
A5	Namibia	5 (Note: As the identity of the Africa 1 winners was not known at the time of the final draw, positions in the World Rugby Rankings were not taken into account, and the placeholder in the draw was automatically seeded into band 5.)	Africa	Africa 1	10 July 2022	7th	2019	Pool stage (1999, 2003, 2007, 2011, 2015, 2019)	23	21

== Overview ==
The opening match of the 2023 Rugby World Cup was played between hosts France and three-time champions New Zealand. France won 27–13, courtesy of tries from Damian Penaud and Melvyn Jaminet. Mark Tele'a scored the first try of the tournament for New Zealand after less than two minutes, making it the quickest try in an opening match of a Rugby World Cup. The loss was New Zealand's first ever in the pool stages of a Rugby World Cup. The next day, Italy won their opening match against Namibia by a score of 52–8. On 14 September, Uruguay played their first match of the tournament against hosts France, which France came out victorious with a scoreline of 27–12. The next day, New Zealand bounced back from their opening day defeat against France with 11 tries over Namibia in a 71–3 victory, despite losing Ethan de Groot to a red card for a dangerous collision. Five days later, Italy recorded a 38–17 bonus point victory over Uruguay, following a second-half comeback which previously saw them trail 17–7. The next day, France recorded their largest ever victory in a 96–0 victory over Namibia to move them on the brink of qualification to the knockout stage, while officially eliminating Namibia from the tournament. Thirteen tries were scored by France, who lost captain and key player Antoine Dupont to an injury from the match.

Namibia played their final match of the tournament against Uruguay in Décines-Charpieu. Namibia went ahead with two early tries from Gerswin Mouton and J. C. Greyling, along with successful penalties and conversions from Tiaan Swanepoel. However, Uruguay turned it around in the second half with tries from Baltazar Amaya, Santiago Arata and Bautista Basso to earn the Uruguayans their first victory of the tournament in a 36–26 victory and deny Namibia their first ever victory in a Rugby World Cup. Two days later, New Zealand faced Italy knowing that a defeat would mean that they would be eliminated from the World Cup at the pool stage for the first time ever. However, the All Blacks came out comfortable winners in the end as they starred in a fourteen-try show in Décines-Charpieu to move to the brink of qualification to the quarter-finals. Aaron Smith scored a hat-trick of tries after just 34 minutes in the bonus-point victory.

In the final matchweek of the pool, New Zealand and Uruguay faced off in Décines-Charpieu for their final matches to try and push for a place in the knockout stage. The All Blacks ran out comfortable winners, inspired by Damian McKenzie who scored two tries and kicked two conversions, in a 73–0 victory that officially saw them qualify for the quarter-finals while officially eliminating Uruguay from the tournament. All that remained in Pool A was the final match between hosts France and Italy to officially decide who would join New Zealand in the knockout stage. Both sides were assured to finish in the top three, meaning they were both assured a place in the 2027 Rugby World Cup, along with the All Blacks. The final match of Pool A took place the following day, with France sweeping aside Italy with a 60–7 scoreline in Décines-Charpieu with eight tries in a match to ensure that France qualified as they topped Group A, New Zealand qualified in second and Italy suffered elimination from the tournament as they finished third, but qualified for the 2027 Rugby World Cup.

== Standings ==
Pos	Team	Pld	W	D	L	PF	PA	PD	TF	TA	B	Pts	Qualification
1	France (H)	4	4	0	0	210	32	+178	27	5	2	18	Advance to knockout stage, and qualification to the 2027 Men's Rugby World Cup
2	New Zealand	4	3	0	1	253	47	+206	38	4	3	15	Advance to knockout stage, and qualification to the 2027 Men's Rugby World Cup
3	Italy	4	2	0	2	114	181	−67	15	25	2	10	Qualification to the 2027 Men's Rugby World Cup
4	Uruguay	4	1	0	3	65	164	−99	9	21	1	5	
5	Namibia	4	0	0	4	37	255	−218	3	37	0	0	

Source: World Rugby
Rules for classification: Pool stage tiebreakers
(H) Host

== Matches ==
=== France vs New Zealand ===
8 September 2023
21:15 CEST (UTC+2)

France	27–13	New Zealand
Try: Penaud 55' c Jaminet 78' m Con: Ramos (1/1) 57'; Pen: Ramos (5/7) 5', 20', 29', 65', 74'	Report	Try: Tele'a (2) 2' m, 43' m Pen: Mo'unga (1/1) 25'

Stade de France, Saint-Denis
Attendance: 78,680
Referee: Jaco Peyper (South Africa)

France	New Zealand

FB	15	Thomas Ramos	(substituted off) 76'
RW	14	Damian Penaud
OC	13	Gaël Fickou
IC	12	Yoram Moefana	(substituted off) 58'
LW	11	Gabin Villière
FH	10	Matthieu Jalibert
SH	9	Antoine Dupont (c)	(substituted off) 76'
N8	8	Grégory Alldritt
OF	7	Charles Ollivon
BF	6	François Cros	(substituted off) 63'
RL	5	Thibaud Flament
LL	4	Cameron Woki	(substituted off) 49'
TP	3	Uini Atonio	(substituted off) 53'
HK	2	Julien Marchand	(substituted off) 12'
LP	1	Reda Wardi	(substituted off) 53'
Replacements:
HK	16	Peato Mauvaka	(substituted in) 12'
PR	17	Jean-Baptiste Gros	(substituted in) 53'
PR	18	Dorian Aldegheri	(substituted in) 53'
LK	19	Romain Taofifénua	(substituted in) 49'
FL	20	Paul Boudehent	(substituted in) 63'
SH	21	Maxime Lucu	(substituted in) 76'
CE	22	Arthur Vincent	(substituted in) 58'
FB	23	Melvyn Jaminet	(substituted in) 76'
Coach:
(France) Fabien Galthié

FB	15	Beauden Barrett
RW	14	Will Jordan	(yellow card) 58'
OC	13	Rieko Ioane
IC	12	Anton Lienert-Brown		(substituted off) 63'
LW	11	Mark Tele'a		(substituted off) 71'
FH	10	Richie Mo'unga
SH	9	Aaron Smith		(substituted off) 63'
N8	8	Ardie Savea (c)
OF	7	Dalton Papalii
BF	6	Tupou Vaa'i		(substituted off) 58'
RL	5	Scott Barrett
LL	4	Sam Whitelock		(substituted off) 69'
TP	3	Nepo Laulala		(substituted off) 53'
HK	2	Codie Taylor		(substituted off) 63'
LP	1	Ethan de Groot		(substituted off) 53'
Replacements:
HK	16	Samisoni Taukei'aho		(substituted in) 63'
PR	17	Ofa Tuʻungafasi		(substituted in) 53'
PR	18	Fletcher Newell		(substituted in) 53'
LK	19	Brodie Retallick		(substituted in) 69'
FL	20	Luke Jacobson		(substituted in) 58'
SH	21	Finlay Christie		(substituted in) 63'
CE	22	David Havili		(substituted in) 63'
WG	23	Leicester Fainga'anuku		(substituted in) 71'
Coach:
(New Zealand) Ian Foster

Player of the Match:
Grégory Alldritt (France)

Assistant referees:
Karl Dickson (England)
Christophe Ridley (England)
Television match official:
Tom Foley (England)

Notes:

- Antoine Dupont (France) and Nepo Laulala (New Zealand) earned their 50th test caps.
- Sam Cane was originally named in the New Zealand starting XV as captain, but withdrew prior to the match after sustaining an injury in the team's final training session. He was replaced by Tupou Vaa'i, whose place on the bench was taken by Brodie Retallick, while the captaincy was handed over to Ardie Savea.
- This was New Zealand's first defeat in a Rugby World Cup pool stage fixture, and their heaviest defeat in a World Cup match.
- Mark Tele'a (New Zealand) scored the fastest try in a Rugby World Cup opening match, at 91 seconds.

=== Italy vs Namibia ===
9 September 2023
13:00 CEST (UTC+2)

(1 BP) Italy	52–8	Namibia
Try: L. Cannone 11' c P. Garbisi 15' c Lamb 46' c Capuozzo 55' c Faiva 74' c Zuliani 78' c Odogwu 80+3' c Con: Allan (7/7) 12', 16', 48', 57', 75', 79', 80+4'; Pen: Allan (1/1) 8'	Report	Try: Mouton 21' m Pen: Swanepoel (1/2) 4'

Stade Geoffroy-Guichard, Saint-Étienne
Attendance: 35,515
Referee: Andrew Brace (Ireland)

Italy	Namibia

FB	15	Tommaso Allan
RW	14	Ange Capuozzo
OC	13	Ignacio Brex	(substituted off) 62'
IC	12	Luca Morisi	(substituted off) 48'
LW	11	Monty Ioane
FH	10	Paolo Garbisi
SH	9	Stephen Varney	(substituted off) 48'
N8	8	Lorenzo Cannone
OF	7	Michele Lamaro (c)
BF	6	Sebastian Negri	(substituted off) 48'
RL	5	Federico Ruzza	12' to 16'
LL	4	Dino Lamb			(substituted off) 57'
TP	3	Simone Ferrari	(substituted off) 50'
HK	2	Giacomo Nicotera	(substituted off) 50'
LP	1	Danilo Fischetti	(substituted off) 57'
Replacements:
HK	16	Hame Faiva	(substituted in) 50'
PR	17	Ivan Nemer	(substituted in) 57'
PR	18	Marco Riccioni	(substituted in) 50'
LK	19	Dave Sisi	(substituted in) 12'	(substituted off) 16'	(substituted in) 57'
FL	20	Manuel Zuliani	(substituted in) 48'
SH	21	Martin Page-Relo	(substituted in) 48'
CE	22	Paolo Odogwu	(substituted in) 62'
WG	23	Pierre Bruno	(substituted in) 48'
Coach:
(New Zealand) Kieran Crowley

FB	15	Divan Rossouw
RW	14	Gerswin Mouton		(substituted off) 62'
OC	13	Johan Deysel (c)
IC	12	Danco Burger		(substituted off) 57'
LW	11	J. C. Greyling
FH	10	Tiaan Swanepoel
SH	9	Damian Stevens		(substituted off) 57'
N8	8	Richard Hardwick
OF	7	Johan Retief
BF	6	Wian Conradie		12' to 16'		(substituted off) 18'	(substituted in) 21'	(substituted off) 62'
RL	5	Tjiuee Uanivi
LL	4	Adriaan Ludick		(substituted off) 48'
TP	3	Aranos Coetzee		(substituted off) 50'
HK	2	Torsten van Jaarsveld	(yellow card) 11'					(substituted off) 52'
LP	1	Des Sethie		(substituted off) 36'
Replacements:
HK	16	Louis van der Westhuizen				(substituted in) 18'	(substituted off) 21'	(substituted in) 52'
PR	17	Jason Benade		(substituted in) 36'
PR	18	Casper Viviers		(substituted in) 50'
LK	19	Tiaan de Klerk		(substituted in) 48'
FL	20	Prince ǃGaoseb		(substituted in) 12'	(substituted off) 16'			(substituted in) 62'
SH	21	Jacques Theron		(substituted in) 57'
FH	22	André van den Berg		(substituted in) 62'
CE	23	Le Roux Malan		(substituted in) 57'
Coach:
(South Africa) Allister Coetzee

Player of the Match:
Lorenzo Cannone (Italy)

Assistant referees:
Paul Williams (New Zealand)
Chris Busby (Ireland)
Television match official:
Joy Neville (Ireland)

Notes:

- This was Italy's largest victory (by margin) at the World Cup, surpassing their previous best of 41 points over Canada at the 2019 Rugby World Cup, and also their largest victory over Namibia.

=== France vs Uruguay ===
14 September 2023
21:00 CEST (UTC+2)

France	27–12	Uruguay
Try: Hastoy 10' c Mauvaka 55' c Bielle-Biarrey 74' c Con: Jaminet (3/3) 11', 56', 75'; Pen: Jaminet (2/3) 3', 14'	Report	Try: Freitas 6' m Amaya 53' c Con: Etcheverry (1/2) 54'

Stade Pierre-Mauroy, Villeneuve-d'Ascq
Attendance: 48,821
Referee: Ben O'Keeffe (New Zealand)

France	Uruguay

FB	15	Melvyn Jaminet
RW	14	Louis Bielle-Biarrey
OC	13	Arthur Vincent
IC	12	Yoram Moefana
LW	11	Gabin Villière
FH	10	Antoine Hastoy
SH	9	Maxime Lucu		(substituted off) 64'
N8	8	Anthony Jelonch (c)		(substituted off) 50'
OF	7	Sekou Macalou
BF	6	Paul Boudehent
RL	5	Romain Taofifénua	(yellow card) 27'	(substituted off) 50'
LL	4	Cameron Woki		(substituted off) 58'
TP	3	Dorian Aldegheri		(substituted off) 50'
HK	2	Pierre Bourgarit		(substituted off) 50'
LP	1	Jean-Baptiste Gros		(substituted off) 50'
Replacements:
HK	16	Peato Mauvaka		(substituted in) 50'
PR	17	Reda Wardi		(substituted in) 50'
PR	18	Sipili Falatea		(substituted in) 50'
LK	19	Bastien Chalureau		(substituted in) 50'
LK	20	Thibaud Flament		(substituted in) 58'
FL	21	François Cros		(substituted in) 50'
SH	22	Baptiste Couilloud		(substituted in) 64'
FB	23	Thomas Ramos
Coach:
(France) Fabien Galthié

FB	15	Baltazar Amaya
RW	14	Bautista Basso
OC	13	Tomás Inciarte
IC	12	Andrés Vilaseca (c)
LW	11	Nicolás Freitas
FH	10	Felipe Etcheverry	(substituted off) 58'
SH	9	Santiago Arata	(substituted off) 58'
N8	8	Manuel Diana	(substituted off) 54'
OF	7	Santiago Civetta
BF	6	Manuel Ardao	(substituted off) 54'
RL	5	Manuel Leindekar
LL	4	Felipe Aliaga	(substituted off) 58'
TP	3	Ignacio Péculo	(substituted off) 50'
HK	2	Guillermo Pujadas	(substituted off) 50'
LP	1	Mateo Sanguinetti	(substituted off) 50'
Replacements:
HK	16	Facundo Gattas	(substituted in) 50'
PR	17	Matías Benítez	(substituted in) 50'
PR	18	Reinaldo Piussi	(substituted in) 50'
LK	19	Ignacio Dotti	(substituted in) 58'
FL	20	Lucas Bianchi	(substituted in) 54'
FL	21	Carlos Deus	(substituted in) 54'
SH	22	Agustín Ormaechea	(substituted in) 58'
FH	23	Felipe Berchesi	(substituted in) 58'
Coach:
(Argentina) Esteban Meneses

Player of the Match:
Maxime Lucu (France)

Assistant referees:
Paul Williams (New Zealand)
James Doleman (New Zealand)
Television match official:
Ben Whitehouse (Wales)

Notes:

- This was the first ever meeting between these two sides at the Rugby World Cup.

=== New Zealand vs Namibia ===
15 September 2023
21:00 CEST (UTC+2)

(1 BP) New Zealand	71–3	Namibia
Try: Roigard (2) 2' c, 7' m McKenzie (2) 20' c, 39' c Fainga'anuku 25' m Lienert-Brown 35' c De Groot 49' m Papalii 55' c Havili 58' c Clarke 67' c Ioane 77' c Con: McKenzie (8/11) 3', 20', 36', 40', 55', 59', 68', 78'	Report	Pen: Swanepoel (1/1) 11'

Stadium de Toulouse, Toulouse
Attendance: 31,996
Referee: Luke Pearce (England)

New Zealand	Namibia

FB	15	Beauden Barrett		(substituted off) 59'
RW	14	Caleb Clarke
OC	13	Anton Lienert-Brown
IC	12	David Havili		(substituted off) 68'
LW	11	Leicester Fainga'anuku
FH	10	Damian McKenzie
SH	9	Cam Roigard		(substituted off) 68'
N8	8	Ardie Savea (c)		(substituted off) 64'
OF	7	Dalton Papalii
BF	6	Luke Jacobson			(substituted off) 74'
RL	5	Sam Whitelock
LL	4	Brodie Retallick		(substituted off) 58'
TP	3	Nepo Laulala		(substituted off) 48'
HK	2	Samisoni Taukei'aho		(substituted off) 52'
LP	1	Ofa Tuʻungafasi		(substituted off) 48'	(substituted in) 74'
Replacements:
HK	16	Dane Coles		(substituted in) 52'
PR	17	Ethan de Groot	(red card) 72'	(substituted in) 48'
PR	18	Fletcher Newell		(substituted in) 48'
LK	19	Scott Barrett		(substituted in) 58'
FL	20	Tupou Vaa'i		(substituted in) 64'
SH	21	Aaron Smith		(substituted in) 68'
FH	22	Richie Mo'unga		(substituted in) 59'
CE	23	Rieko Ioane		(substituted in) 68'
Coach:
(New Zealand) Ian Foster

FB	15	Cliven Loubser
RW	14	Gerswin Mouton
OC	13	Johan Deysel (c)
IC	12	Le Roux Malan	(substituted off) 18'
LW	11	Divan Rossouw
FH	10	Tiaan Swanepoel
SH	9	Damian Stevens	(substituted off) 72'
N8	8	Richard Hardwick	(substituted off) 59'
OF	7	Prince ǃGaoseb	(substituted off) 68'
BF	6	Wian Conradie	(substituted off) 50'
RL	5	Tjiuee Uanivi
LL	4	Johan Retief
TP	3	Aranos Coetzee	(substituted off) 74'
HK	2	Torsten van Jaarsveld	(substituted off) 50'
LP	1	Jason Benade	(substituted off) 50'
Replacements:
HK	16	Louis van der Westhuizen	(substituted in) 50'
PR	17	Des Sethie	(substituted in) 50'
PR	18	Haitembu Shikufa	(substituted in) 74'
LK	19	P. J. van Lill	(substituted in) 50'
FL	20	Adriaan Booysen	(substituted in) 59'
FL	21	Max Katjijeko	(substituted in) 68'
SH	22	Jacques Theron	(substituted in) 72'
CE	23	J. C. Greyling	(substituted in) 18'
Coach:
(South Africa) Allister Coetzee

Player of the Match:
Cam Roigard (New Zealand)

Assistant referees:
Andrew Brace (Ireland)
Jordan Way (Australia)
Television match official:
Brian MacNeice (Ireland)

Notes:

- This was the first ever match which New Zealand performed Kapa o Pango against a Tier 2 nation.
- Sam Whitelock equalled the New Zealand test cap record, with 148 caps, drawing level with Richie McCaw.

=== Italy vs Uruguay ===
20 September 2023
17:45 CEST (UTC+2)

(1 BP) Italy	38–17	Uruguay
Try: Pani 7' c Lamaro 46' c Ioane 52' c L. Cannone 56' c Brex 61' c Con: Allan (5/5) 8', 47', 53', 57', 62'; Pen: P. Garbisi (1/1) 70'	Report	Try: Penalty try 27'; Freitas 37' c Con: Etcheverry (1/1) 38'; Drop: Etcheverry (1/1) 42'

Allianz Riviera, Nice
Attendance: 28,627
Referee: Angus Gardner (Australia)

Italy	Uruguay

FB	15	Ange Capuozzo
RW	14	Lorenzo Pani		(substituted off) 30'	(substituted in) 37'
OC	13	Ignacio Brex
IC	12	Paolo Garbisi
LW	11	Monty Ioane
FH	10	Tommaso Allan		(substituted off) 68'
SH	9	Alessandro Garbisi		(substituted off) 60'
N8	8	Lorenzo Cannone	(yellow card) 25'	(substituted off) 63'
OF	7	Michele Lamaro (c)
BF	6	Sebastian Negri		(substituted off) 60'
RL	5	Federico Ruzza
LL	4	Niccolò Cannone		(substituted off) 50'
TP	3	Marco Riccioni		(substituted off) 50'
HK	2	Giacomo Nicotera		(substituted off) 68'
LP	1	Danilo Fischetti	(yellow card) 27'			(substituted off) 68'
Replacements:
PR	16	Federico Zani		(substituted in) 68'
PR	17	Ivan Nemer		(substituted in) 30'	(substituted off) 37'	(substituted in) 68'
PR	18	Pietro Ceccarelli		(substituted in) 50'
LK	19	Dino Lamb		(substituted in) 50'
FL	20	Manuel Zuliani		(substituted in) 60'
SH	21	Giovanni Pettinelli		(substituted in) 63'
CE	22	Alessandro Fusco		(substituted in) 60'
WG	23	Paolo Odogwu		(substituted in) 68'
Coach:
(New Zealand) Kieran Crowley

FB	15	Baltazar Amaya		(substituted off) 63'
RW	14	Gastón Mieres
OC	13	Tomás Inciarte
IC	12	Andrés Vilaseca (c)	(yellow card) 43'
LW	11	Nicolás Freitas		(substituted off) 67'
FH	10	Felipe Etcheverry
SH	9	Santiago Arata		(substituted off) 67'
N8	8	Manuel Diana		(substituted off) 57'
OF	7	Santiago Civetta
BF	6	Manuel Ardao
RL	5	Manuel Leindekar
LL	4	Felipe Aliaga		(substituted off) 63'
TP	3	Ignacio Péculo		(substituted off) 60'
HK	2	Germán Kessler		(substituted off) 57'
LP	1	Mateo Sanguinetti		(substituted off) 57'
Replacements:
HK	16	Guillermo Pujadas		(substituted in) 57'
PR	17	Facundo Gattas		(substituted in) 57'
PR	18	Diego Arbelo		(substituted in) 60'
LK	19	Ignacio Dotti		(substituted in) 63'
FL	20	Carlos Deus		(substituted in) 57'
SH	21	Agustín Ormaechea		(substituted in) 67'
FH	22	Felipe Berchesi		(substituted in) 63'
CE	23	Bautista Basso		(substituted in) 67'
Coach:
(Argentina) Esteban Meneses

Player of the Match:
Michele Lamaro (Italy)

Assistant referees:
Andrew Brace (Ireland)
Jordan Way (Australia)
Television match official:
Tom Foley (England)

Notes:

- This was the first ever meeting between these two sides at a World Cup.
- Sebastian Negri (Italy) earned his 50th test cap.
- Luca Bigi was originally named as the replacement hooker on the Italy bench, but withdrew prior to the match due to injury. He was replaced by Ivan Nemer, who took the position of substitute loosehead prop, while Federico Zani shifted across to the role of hooker.

=== France vs Namibia ===
21 September 2023
21:00 CEST (UTC+2)

(1 BP) France	96–0	Namibia
Try: Penaud (3) 6' m, 21' c, 55' c Danty (2) 9' c, 26' c Ollivon (2) 18' c, 68' c Flament 33' c Dupont 38' c Bielle-Biarrey (2) 40+1' c, 64' c Couilloud 47' c Jaminet 76' c Penalty try 80'; Con: Ramos (12/13) 10', 18', 22', 27', 34', 39', 40+2', 48', 56', 65', 70', 77'	Report

Stade Vélodrome, Marseille
Attendance: 63,486
Referee: Matthew Carley (England)

France	Namibia

FB	15	Thomas Ramos
RW	14	Damian Penaud
OC	13	Gaël Fickou
IC	12	Jonathan Danty
LW	11	Louis Bielle-Biarrey
FH	10	Matthieu Jalibert	(substituted off) 54'
SH	9	Antoine Dupont (c)	(substituted off) 46'
N8	8	Anthony Jelonch	(substituted off) 54'
OF	7	Charles Ollivon
BF	6	François Cros
RL	5	Thibaud Flament
LL	4	Cameron Woki	(substituted off) 41'	(substituted in) 57'	(substituted off) 65'
TP	3	Uini Atonio	(substituted off) 41'
HK	2	Peato Mauvaka	(substituted off) 54'
LP	1	Cyril Baille	(substituted off) 41'
Replacements:
HK	16	Pierre Bourgarit	(substituted in) 54'
PR	17	Reda Wardi	(substituted in) 41'
PR	18	Dorian Aldegheri	(substituted in) 41'
LK	19	Romain Taofifénua	(substituted in) 41'
FL	20	Paul Boudehent	(substituted in) 54'	(substituted off) 57'
SH	21	Baptiste Couilloud	(substituted in) 46'
CE	22	Yoram Moefana			(substituted in) 65'
FB	23	Melvyn Jaminet	(substituted in) 54'
Coach:
(France) Fabien Galthié

FB	15	André van den Berg		(substituted off) 41'
RW	14	Gerswin Mouton		(substituted off) 56'
OC	13	Johan Deysel (c)	(red card) 45'
IC	12	Danco Burger
LW	11	J. C. Greyling
FH	10	Cliven Loubser
SH	9	Jacques Theron		(substituted off) 59'
N8	8	Prince ǃGaoseb		(substituted off) 41'
OF	7	Johan Retief
BF	6	Max Katjijeko
RL	5	Adriaan Ludick
LL	4	Mahepisa Tjeriko		(substituted off) 41'
TP	3	Aranos Coetzee		(substituted off) 74'
HK	2	Louis van der Westhuizen		(substituted off) 65'
LP	1	Des Sethie		(substituted off) 51'
Replacements:
HK	16	Obert Nortje		(substituted in) 65'
PR	17	Jason Benade	(yellow card) 80'	(substituted in) 51'
PR	18	Haitembu Shifuka		(substituted in) 74'
LK	19	P. J. van Lill		(substituted in) 41'
FL	20	Richard Hardwick		(substituted in) 41'
SH	21	Oela Blaauw		(substituted in) 59'
CE	22	Alcino Izaacs		(substituted in) 56'
WG	23	Divan Rossouw		(substituted in) 41'
Coach:
(South Africa) Allister Coetzee

Player of the Match:
Damian Penaud (France)

Assistant referees:
Andrew Brace (Ireland)
Craig Evans (Wales)
Television match official:
Joy Neville (Ireland)

Notes:

- This was France's largest victory in test match history, and also their largest victory at the World Cup – surpassing their 87–10 win, also against Namibia, at the 2007 Rugby World Cup.
- Oela Blaauw (Namibia) made his international debut.

=== Uruguay vs Namibia ===
27 September 2023
17:45 CEST (UTC+2)

(1 BP) Uruguay	36–26	Namibia
Try: Amaya (2) 19' m, 49' c Kessler 28' c Arata 54' c Basso 66' c Con: Etcheverry (3/4) 29', 51', 55'; Berchesi (1/1) 67'; Pen: Berchesi (1/1) 74'	Report	Try: Mouton 1' c Greyling 11' c Con: Swanepoel (2/2) 2', 12'; Pen: Swanepoel (4/4) 25', 35', 43', 69'

Parc Olympique Lyonnais, Décines-Charpieu
Attendance: 49,342
Referee: Mathieu Raynal (France)

Uruguay	Namibia

FB	15	Baltazar Amaya
RW	14	Bautista Basso
OC	13	Felipe Arcos Pérez
IC	12	Andrés Vilaseca (c)
LW	11	Nicolás Freitas		(substituted off) 60'
FH	10	Felipe Etcheverry		(substituted off) 60'
SH	9	Santiago Arata		(substituted off) 68'
N8	8	Carlos Deus
OF	7	Santiago Civetta		(substituted off) 61'
BF	6	Manuel Ardao
RL	5	Manuel Leindekar
LL	4	Felipe Aliaga		(substituted off) 69'
TP	3	Diego Arbelo		(substituted off) 61'
HK	2	Germán Kessler		(substituted off) 61'
LP	1	Mateo Sanguinetti		(substituted off) 61'	(substituted in) 65'
Replacements:
HK	16	Guillermo Pujadas		(substituted in) 61'
PR	17	Facundo Gattas		(substituted in) 61'	(substituted off) 65'
PR	18	Reinaldo Piussi		(substituted in) 61'
LK	19	Juan Manuel Rodríguez		(substituted in) 69'
FL	20	Eric Dosantos	(yellow card) 76'	(substituted in) 61'
SH	21	Agustín Ormaechea		(substituted in) 68'
FH	22	Felipe Berchesi		(substituted in) 60'
WG	23	Juan Manuel Alonso		(substituted in) 60'
Coach:
(Argentina) Esteban Meneses

FB	15	Cliven Loubser
RW	14	Gerswin Mouton		(substituted off) 72'
OC	13	Alcino Izaacs
IC	12	Danco Burger
LW	11	J. C. Greyling			(substituted off) 64'
FH	10	Tiaan Swanepoel
SH	9	Damian Stevens		(substituted off) 74'
N8	8	Richard Hardwick		(substituted off) 60'
OF	7	Tjiuee Uanivi (c)	(yellow card) 61'
BF	6	Prince ǃGaoseb		(substituted off) 48'	(substituted in) 57'
RL	5	Tiaan de Klerk		(substituted off) 72'
LL	4	Adriaan Ludick		(substituted off) 55'
TP	3	Aranos Coetzee	(yellow card) 48'
HK	2	Torsten van Jaarsveld		(substituted off) 61'
LP	1	Jason Benade		(substituted off) 57'	(substituted in) 64'
Replacements:
HK	16	Louis van der Westhuizen		(substituted in) 61'
PR	17	Desiderius Sethie	(red card) 63'	(substituted in) 57'
PR	18	Haitembu Shifuka		(substituted in) 48'	(substituted off) 57'
LK	19	P. J. van Lill		(substituted in) 55'
FL	20	Adriaan Booysen		(substituted in) 60'
FL	21	Max Katjijeko		(substituted in) 72'
SH	22	Jacques Theron		(substituted in) 74'
FH	23	André van den Berg		(substituted in) 72'
Coach:
(South Africa) Allister Coetzee

Player of the Match:
Santiago Arata (Uruguay)

Assistant referees:
Nic Berry (Australia)
Chris Busby (Ireland)
Television match official:
Ben Whitehouse (Wales)

Notes:

- This was the first ever meeting between these two sides at a World Cup.
- Namibia achieved their highest points total in a World Cup match, surpassing the 25 points scored against Fiji in 2011.
- Uruguay achieved their highest points total in a World Cup march, surpassing the 30 points scored against Fiji in 2019.

=== New Zealand vs Italy ===
29 September 2023
21:00 CEST (UTC+2)

(1 BP) New Zealand	96–17	Italy
Try: Jordan (2) 7' c, 70' c Smith (3) 17' c, 27' c, 34' c Tele'a 19' c Savea (2) 22' c, 40+5' c Retallick 50' c Papalii 55' c Coles (2) 61' m, 73' c McKenzie 67' c Lienert-Brown 76' c Con: Mo'unga (9/10) 8', 18', 20, 23', 28', 35', 40+6', 51', 57'; McKenzie (4/4) 69', 71', 74', 77'	Report	Try: Capuozzo 48' c Ioane 80+1' c Con: Allan (1/1) 49'; P. Garbisi (1/1) 80+3'; Pen: Allan (1/1) 10'

Parc Olympique Lyonnais, Décines-Charpieu
Attendance: 57,083
Referee: Matthew Carley (England)

New Zealand	Italy

FB	15	Beauden Barrett
RW	14	Will Jordan
OC	13	Rieko Ioane
IC	12	Jordie Barrett	(substituted off) 64'
LW	11	Mark Tele'a
FH	10	Richie Mo'unga	(substituted off) 64'
SH	9	Aaron Smith	(substituted off) 49'
N8	8	Ardie Savea (c)
OF	7	Dalton Papalii	(substituted off) 57'
BF	6	Shannon Frizell	(substituted off) 49'
RL	5	Scott Barrett
LL	4	Brodie Retallick
TP	3	Nepo Laulala	(substituted off) 49'
HK	2	Codie Taylor	(substituted off) 57'
LP	1	Ofa Tuʻungafasi	(substituted off) 49'
Replacements:
HK	16	Dane Coles	(substituted in) 57'
PR	17	Tamaiti Williams	(substituted in) 49'
PR	18	Tyrel Lomax	(substituted in) 49'
LK	19	Sam Whitelock	(substituted in) 49'
FL	20	Sam Cane	(substituted in) 57'
SH	21	Cam Roigard	(substituted in) 49'
FH	22	Damian McKenzie	(substituted in) 64'
CE	23	Anton Lienert-Brown	(substituted in) 64'
Coach:
(New Zealand) Ian Foster

FB	15	Tommaso Allan	(substituted off) 60'
RW	14	Ange Capuozzo
OC	13	Ignacio Brex
IC	12	Luca Morisi
LW	11	Monty Ioane
FH	10	Paolo Garbisi
SH	9	Stephen Varney	(substituted off) 49'
N8	8	Lorenzo Cannone
OF	7	Michele Lamaro (c)	(substituted off) 65'
BF	6	Sebastian Negri	(substituted off) 49'
RL	5	Federico Ruzza
LL	4	Dino Lamb	(substituted off) 41'
TP	3	Marco Riccioni	45' to 56'		(substituted off) 65'
HK	2	Giacomo Nicotera	(substituted off) 49'
LP	1	Danilo Fischetti	(substituted off) 18'
Replacements:
HK	16	Hame Faiva	(substituted in) 49'
PR	17	Ivan Nemer	(substituted in) 18'
PR	18	Simone Ferrari	(substituted in) 45'	(substituted off) 56'	(substituted in) 65'
LK	19	Niccolò Cannone	(substituted in) 41'
FL	20	Manuel Zuliani	(substituted in) 49'
N8	21	Toa Halafihi	(substituted in) 65'
SH	22	Martin Page-Relo	(substituted in) 49'
WG	23	Paolo Odogwu	(substituted in) 60'
Coach:
(New Zealand) Kieran Crowley

Player of the Match:
Ardie Savea (New Zealand)

Assistant referees:
Nic Berry (Australia)
Christophe Ridley (England)
Television match official:
Brett Cronan (Australia)

Notes:

- Sam Whitelock became the most capped New Zealand player in test history, with 149 appearances, and the second most capped test player overall, behind only Wales international Alun Wyn Jones.

=== New Zealand vs Uruguay ===
5 October 2023
21:00 CEST (UTC+2)

(1 BP) New Zealand	73–0	Uruguay
Try: McKenzie (2) 20' c, 53' c Mo'unga 25' c Jordan (2) 33' c, 65' c Roigard 38' m Newell 45' m Fainga'anuku (3) 49' c, 68' c, 77' c Williams 73' c Con: Mo'unga (5/7) 21', 26', 34', 50', 54'; McKenzie (2/2) 66', 69'; B. Barrett (2/2) 74', 78'	Report

Parc Olympique Lyonnais, Décines-Charpieu
Attendance: 57,672
Referee: Wayne Barnes (England)

New Zealand	Uruguay

FB	15	Damian McKenzie
RW	14	Will Jordan
OC	13	Anton Lienert-Brown
IC	12	Jordie Barrett	(substituted off) 53'
LW	11	Leicester Fainga'anuku
FH	10	Richie Mo'unga	(substituted off) 63'
SH	9	Cam Roigard	(substituted off) 53'
N8	8	Luke Jacobson
OF	7	Sam Cane (c)
BF	6	Shannon Frizell	(substituted off) 54'
RL	5	Tupou Vaa'i
LL	4	Sam Whitelock	(substituted off) 63'
TP	3	Tyrel Lomax	(substituted off) 9'
HK	2	Codie Taylor	(substituted off) 46'
LP	1	Ofa Tuʻungafasi	(substituted off) 46'	(substituted in) 74'
Replacements:
HK	16	Samisoni Taukei'aho	(substituted in) 46'	(substituted off) 74'
PR	17	Tamaiti Williams	(substituted in) 46'
PR	18	Fletcher Newell	(substituted in) 9'
LK	19	Scott Barrett	(substituted in) 63'
FL	20	Ethan Blackadder	(substituted in) 54'
SH	21	Finlay Christie	(substituted in) 53'
FH	22	Beauden Barrett	(substituted in) 63'
WG	23	Caleb Clarke	(substituted in) 53'
Coach:
(New Zealand) Ian Foster

FB	15	Rodrigo Silva
RW	14	Gastón Mieres	(substituted off) 58'
OC	13	Tomás Inciarte
IC	12	Andrés Vilaseca (c)
LW	11	Nicolás Freitas
FH	10	Felipe Etcheverry	(substituted off) 50'
SH	9	Santiago Arata	(substituted off) 60'
N8	8	Manuel Diana	(substituted off) 55'
OF	7	Lucas Bianchi
BF	6	Manuel Ardao
RL	5	Manuel Leindekar
LL	4	Ignacio Dotti	(substituted off) 47'
TP	3	Diego Arbelo	(substituted off) 58'
HK	2	Germán Kessler	(substituted off) 63'
LP	1	Mateo Sanguinetti	(substituted off) 64'
Replacements:
HK	16	Guillermo Pujadas	(substituted in) 63'
PR	17	Matías Benítez	(substituted in) 64'
PR	18	Ignacio Péculo	(substituted in) 58'
LK	19	Juan Manuel Rodríguez	(substituted in) 47'
FL	20	Santiago Civetta	(substituted in) 55'
SH	21	Agustín Ormaechea	(substituted in) 60'
FH	22	Felipe Berchesi	(substituted in) 50'
WG	23	Juan Manuel Alonso	(substituted in) 58'
Coach:
(Argentina) Esteban Meneses

Player of the Match:
Damian McKenzie (New Zealand)

Assistant referees:
Matthew Carley (England)
Jordan Way (Australia)
Television match official:
Marius Jonker (South Africa)

Notes:

- This was the first ever meeting between these two sides.
- Sam Whitelock (New Zealand) became only the second player in history to earn 150 test caps. He also became the most capped player at the World Cup, with 23 appearances across four tournaments, surpassing Jason Leonard and Richie McCaw.
- This was the fifth match at the 2023 World Cup where the losing team failed to score any points – a new record for a single tournament, surpassing 2007 and 2019.

=== France vs Italy ===
6 October 2023
21:00 CEST (UTC+2)

(1 BP) France	60–7	Italy
Try: Penaud (2) 2' c, 38' c Bielle-Biarrey 13' c Ramos 22' c Jalibert 47' c Mauvaka 54' c Moefana (2) 64' c, 76' m Con: Ramos (6/6) 4', 14', 23', 39', 48', 55'; Jaminet (1/2) 65'; Pen: Ramos (1/2) 7'; Jaminet (1/1) 80+1'	Report	Try: Zuliani 71' c Con: Allan (1/1) 72'

Parc Olympique Lyonnais, Décines-Charpieu
Attendance: 58,102
Referee: Karl Dickson (England)

France	Italy

FB	15	Thomas Ramos	(substituted off) 61'
RW	14	Damian Penaud
OC	13	Gaël Fickou	(substituted off) 61'
IC	12	Jonathan Danty
LW	11	Louis Bielle-Biarrey
FH	10	Matthieu Jalibert
SH	9	Maxime Lucu	(substituted off) 55'
N8	8	Grégory Alldritt
OF	7	Charles Ollivon (c)	(substituted off) 55'
BF	6	Anthony Jelonch
RL	5	Thibaud Flament	(substituted off) 45'
LL	4	Cameron Woki
TP	3	Uini Atonio	(substituted off) 45'
HK	2	Peato Mauvaka	(substituted off) 55'
LP	1	Cyril Baille	(substituted off) 55'
Replacements:
HK	16	Pierre Bourgarit	(substituted in) 55'
PR	17	Reda Wardi	(substituted in) 55'
PR	18	Dorian Aldegheri	(substituted in) 45'
LK	19	Romain Taofifénua	(substituted in) 45'
FL	20	François Cros	(substituted in) 55'
SH	21	Baptiste Couilloud	(substituted in) 55'
CE	22	Yoram Moefana	(substituted in) 61'
FB	23	Melvyn Jaminet	(substituted in) 61'
Coach:
(France) Fabien Galthié

FB	15	Ange Capuozzo	(substituted off) 31'
RW	14	Pierre Bruno	(substituted off) 65'
OC	13	Ignacio Brex
IC	12	Paolo Garbisi
LW	11	Monty Ioane
FH	10	Tommaso Allan
SH	9	Stephen Varney	(substituted off) 44'
N8	8	Lorenzo Cannone
OF	7	Michele Lamaro (c)	(substituted off) 44'
BF	6	Sebastian Negri
RL	5	Federico Ruzza
LL	4	Niccolò Cannone	(substituted off) 57'
TP	3	Pietro Ceccarelli	(substituted off) 55'
HK	2	Hame Faiva	(substituted off) 61'
LP	1	Simone Ferrari	(substituted off) 61'
Replacements:
HK	16	Marco Manfredi	(substituted in) 61'
PR	17	Federico Zani	(substituted in) 61'
PR	18	Marco Riccioni	(substituted in) 55'
LK	19	Dave Sisi	(substituted in) 57'
FL	20	Manuel Zuliani	(substituted in) 44'
SH	21	Alessandro Fusco	(substituted in) 44'
CE	22	Luca Morisi	(substituted in) 65'
FB	23	Lorenzo Pani	(substituted in) 31'
Coach:
(New Zealand) Kieran Crowley

Player of the Match:
Grégory Alldritt (France)

Assistant referees:
Luke Pearce (England)
Craig Evans (Wales)
Television match official:
Marius Jonker (South Africa)

Notes:

- Simone Ferrari and Luca Morisi (Italy) earned their 50th test caps.
- This was France's biggest ever win over Italy (by margin).
