= Italy at the Rugby World Cup =

Nation performance in the Rugby World Cup

Italy have competed in all the Rugby World Cup tournaments, having made their first appearance in the inaugural 1987 tournament. They have finished third in their pool at every tournament, except in 1999, the only tournament where they lost more than two games. Having never finished in the top two in their pool, they have never qualified to progress to the quarter-finals. They have won the most matches of those that have never made it to the quarter-finals.

Because they finished third in Pool C of the 2007 Rugby World Cup in France, they automatically qualified to compete in the 2011 tournament in New Zealand. A similar finishing position in that tournament saw them automatically qualify for the 2015 World Cup in England, where they retained the third place and the automatic qualification for France 2023.

== By position ==
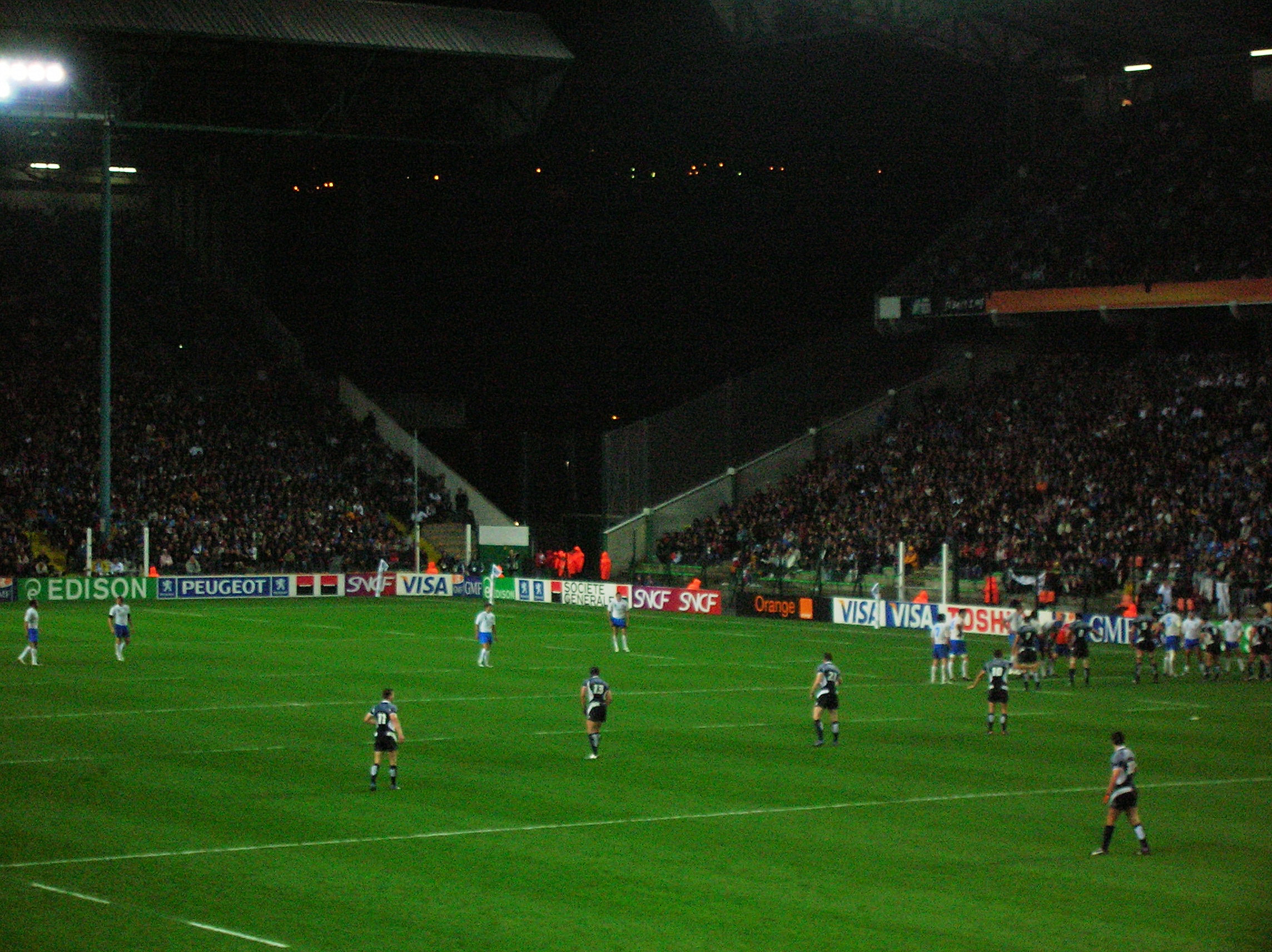
Scotland vs Italy at St Etienne, 2007 World Cup

Rugby World Cup record									Qualification						
Year	Round	Pld	W	D	L	PF	PA	Squad	Pos	Pld	W	D	L	PF	PA
(New Zealand) (Australia) 1987	Pool stage	3	1	0	2	40	110	Squad	Invited						
(England) (France) (Ireland) (Scotland) (Wales) 1991	Pool stage	3	1	0	2	57	76	Squad	1st	3	3	0	0	83	38
(South Africa) 1995	Pool stage	3	1	0	2	69	94	Squad	2nd	4	3	0	1	210	52
(Wales) 1999	Pool stage	3	0	0	3	35	196	Squad	2nd	6	5	0	1	302	92
(Australia) 2003	Pool stage	4	2	0	2	77	123	Squad	1st	2	2	0	0	75	20
(France) 2007	Pool stage	4	2	0	2	85	117	Squad	1st	2	2	0	0	150	7
(New Zealand) 2011	Pool stage	4	2	0	2	92	95	Squad	Automatically qualified						
(England) 2015	Pool stage	4	2	0	2	74	88	Squad	Automatically qualified						
(Japan) 2019	Pool stage	4	2	1	1	98	78	Squad	Automatically qualified						
(France) 2023	Pool stage	4	2	0	2	114	181	Squad	Automatically qualified						
(Australia) 2027	Qualified								Automatically qualified						
(United States) 2031	To be determined								To be determined						
Total	—	36	15	1	20	741	1158	—	—	17	15	0	2	820	209
Champions; Runners–up; Third place; Fourth place; Home venue

During Typhoon Hagibis; New Zealand v Italy was to be cancelled and recorded as 0–0 draw

== Tournaments ==
=== 1987 Rugby World Cup ===
Team	Pld	W	D	L	PF	PA	PD	T	Pts	Qualification
New Zealand	3	3	0	0	190	34	+156	30	6	Knockout stage
Fiji	3	1	0	2	56	101	−45	6	2 (Note: Fiji qualified for the highest number of tries (Fiji 6, Italy 5, Argentina 4))	Knockout stage
Italy	3	1	0	2	40	110	−70	5	2	
Argentina	3	1	0	2	49	90	−41	4	2	

Notes:

22 May 1987

New Zealand	70–6	Italy
Try: Kirwan (2); Kirk (2); Green (2); Penalty try Jones; Taylor; McDowell; Stanley; Whetton; Con: Fox (8); Pen: Fox (2)	Report	Pen: Collodo; Drop: Collodo

Eden Park, Auckland
Attendance: 20,000
Referee: Bob Fordham (Australia)

28 May 1987

Argentina	25–16	Italy
Try: Lanza; Gómez; Con: Porta; Pen: Porta (5)	Report	Try: Innocenti; Cuttitta; Con: Collodo; Pen: Collodo (2)

Lancaster Park, Christchurch
Attendance: 2,000
Referee: Roger Quittenton (England)

31 May 1987

Fiji	15–18	Italy
Try: Naivilawasa; Con: Koroduadua; Pen: Koroduadua (2); Drop: Qoro		Try: Cuttitta; Cucchiella; Mascioletti; Pen: Collodo; Drop: Collodo

Carisbrook, Dunedin
Attendance: 13,000
Referee: Keith Lawrence (New Zealand)

=== 1991 Rugby World Cup ===
Team	Pld	W	D	L	PF	PA	PD	Pts
New Zealand	3	3	0	0	95	39	+56	6
England	3	2	0	1	85	33	+52	4
Italy	3	1	0	2	57	76	−19	2
United States	3	0	0	3	24	113	−89	0

5 October 1991

Italy	30–9	United States
Try: Barba; Francescato; Vaccari; Gaetaniello; Con: Domínguez (4); Pen: Domínguez (2)		Try: Swords; Con: Williams; Pen: Williams

Cross Green, Otley
Referee: Owen Doyle (Ireland)

8 October 1991

England	36–6	Italy
Try: Guscott (2); Underwood; Webb; Con: Webb (4); Pen: Webb (4)		Try: Cuttitta; Con: Domínguez

Twickenham Stadium, London
Referee: Brian Anderson (Scotland)

13 October 1991

Italy	21–31	New Zealand
Try: Cuttitta; Bonomi; Con: Domínguez (2); Pen: Domínguez (3)		Try: Brooke; Innes; Tuigamala; Hewett; Con: Fox (3); Pen: Fox (3)

Welford Road Stadium, Leicester
Attendance: 16,800
Referee: Kerry Fitzgerald (Australia)

=== 1995 Rugby World Cup ===
Team	Pld	W	D	L	PF	PA	PD	Pts
England	3	3	0	0	95	60	+35	9
Western Samoa	3	2	0	1	96	88	+8	7
Italy	3	1	0	2	69	94	−25	5
Argentina	3	0	0	3	69	87	−18	3

27 May 1995

Italy	18–42	Western Samoa
Try: Vaccari; Cuttitta; Con: Domínguez; Pen: Domínguez; Drop: Domínguez	Report	Try: Lima (2); Harder (2); Kellett; Tatupu; Con: Kellett (3); Pen: Kellett (2)

Basil Kenyon Stadium, East London
Attendance: 11,000
Referee: Joel Dume (France)

31 May 1995

England	27–20	Italy
Try: R. Underwood; T. Underwood; Con: Andrew; Pen: Andrew (5)		Try: Cuttitta; Vaccari; Con: Domínguez (2); Pen: Domínguez (2)

Kings Park Stadium, Durban
Attendance: 21,000
Referee: Stephen Hilditch (Ireland)

4 June 1995

Argentina	25–31	Italy
Try: Corral; MartínMartín; Cilley; Con: Cilley; Pen: Cilley		Try: Vaccari; Gerosa; Domínguez; Con: Domínguez (2); Pen: Domínguez (4)

Basil Kenyon Stadium, East London
Attendance: 11,000
Referee: Clayton Thomas (Wales)

=== 1999 Rugby World Cup ===
Team	Pld	W	D	L	PF	PA	PD	Pts
New Zealand	3	3	0	0	176	28	+148	9
England	3	2	0	1	184	47	+137	7
Tonga	3	1	0	2	47	171	−124	5
Italy	3	0	0	3	35	196	−161	3

3 October 1999

England	67–7	Italy
Try: Wilkinson; Hill; Luger; Back; De Glanville; Corry; Dawson; Perry; Con: Wilkinson (6); Pen: Wilkinson (5)		Try: Domínguez; Con: Domínguez

Twickenham Stadium, London
Attendance: 73,470
Referee: André Watson (South Africa)

10 October 1999

Italy	25–28	Tonga
Try: Moscardi; Con: Domínguez; Pen: Domínguez (6)		Try: Taufahema; Fatani; Tuipulotu; Con: Tuipulotu (2); Pen: Tuipulotu (2); Drop: Tuipulotu

Welford Road Stadium, Leicester
Referee: David McHugh (Ireland)

14 October 1999

New Zealand	101–3	Italy
Try: Wilson (3); Osborne (2); Lomu (2); Randell; Brown; Cullen; Hammett; Gibson; Robertson; Mika; Con: Brown (11); Pen: Brown (3)		Pen: Dominguez

McAlpine Stadium, Huddersfield
Referee: Jim Fleming (Scotland)

=== 2003 Rugby World Cup ===
Team	Pld	W	D	L	PF	PA	PD	BP	Pts	Qualification
New Zealand	4	4	0	0	282	57	+225	4	20	Quarter-finals
Wales	4	3	0	1	132	98	+34	2	14	Quarter-finals
Italy	4	2	0	2	77	123	−46	0	8	
Canada	4	1	0	3	54	135	−81	1	5	
Tonga	4	0	0	4	46	178	−132	1	1	

11 October 2003

New Zealand	70–7	Italy
Try: B. Thorn; R. Thorne; Howlett (2); Spencer (2); Rokocoko (2); Marshall; Carter; MacDonald; Con: Carter (6); Pen: Spencer		Try: Phillips; Con: Peens

Telstra Dome, Melbourne
Attendance: 41,715
Referee: Andrew Cole (Australia)

15 October 2003

Italy	36–12	Tonga
Try: M. Dallan; D. Dallan (2); Con: Wakarua (3); Pen: Wakarua (5)		Try: Payne; Tuʻifua; Con: Tuipulotu

Canberra Stadium
Attendance: 18,967
Referee: Steve Walsh (New Zealand)

21 October 2003

Italy	19–14	Canada
Try: Parisse; Con: Wakarua; Pen: Wakarua (4)		Try: Fyffe; Pen: Barker (3)

Canberra Stadium
Attendance: 20,515
Referee: Paddy O'Brien (New Zealand)

25 October 2003

Italy	15–27	Wales
Pen: Wakarua (5)		Try: M. Jones; Parker; D. Jones; Con: Harris (3); Pen: Harris (3)

Canberra Stadium
Attendance: 22,641
Referee: Andrew Cole (Australia)

=== 2007 Rugby World Cup ===
Pos	Team	Pld	W	D	L	PF	PA	PD	B	Pts	Qualification
1	New Zealand	4	4	0	0	309	35	+274	4	20	Qualified for the quarter-finals
2	Scotland	4	3	0	1	116	66	+50	2	14	Qualified for the quarter-finals
3	Italy	4	2	0	2	85	117	−32	1	9	Eliminated, automatic qualification for RWC 2011
4	Romania	4	1	0	3	40	161	−121	1	5	
5	Portugal	4	0	0	4	38	209	−171	1	1	

8 September 2007
13:45

New Zealand	76–14	Italy
Try: McCaw (2) 2' c, 7' c Howlett (3) 12' c, 56' c, 59' m Muliaina 15' c Sivivatu (2) 18' c, 29' m Jack 50' c Collins (2) 68' c, 70' c Con: Carter (7/9); McAlister (2/2); Pen: Carter (1/1) 11'	Report	Try: Stanojevic 38' c Mi. Bergamasco 71' c Con: Bortolussi (1/1); De Marigny (1/1)

Stade Vélodrome, Marseille
Attendance: 58,612
Referee: Wayne Barnes (England)

12 September 2007
20:00

Italy	24–18	Romania
Try: Dellapè 6' m Penalty try 55' c Con: Pez (1/1); Pen: Bortolussi (1/2) 14'; Ramiro Pez (3/3) 62', 66', 72'	Report	Try: Manta 43' m Țincu 47' c Con: Dimofte (1/1); Pen: Dimofte (2/2) 70', 74'

Stade Vélodrome, Marseille
Attendance: 44,241
Referee: Tony Spreadbury (England)

19 September 2007
20:00

Italy	31–5	Portugal
Try: Masi (2) 4' c, 77' c Ma. Bergamasco 72' m Con: Bortolussi (2/3); Pen: Bortolussi (4/4) 17', 30', 40+', 63'	Report	Try: Penalva 33' m

Parc des Princes, Paris
Attendance: 45,476
Referee: Marius Jonker (South Africa)

29 September 2007
21:00

Scotland	18–16	Italy
Pen: Paterson (6/6) 2', 6', 32', 35', 47', 53'	Report	Try: Troncon 13' c Con: Bortolussi (1/1); Pen: Bortolussi (3/6) 18', 56', 62'

Stade Geoffroy-Guichard, Saint-Étienne
Attendance: 34,701
Referee: Jonathan Kaplan (South Africa)

=== 2011 Rugby World Cup ===
Pos	Team	Pld	W	D	L	PF	PA	PD	T	B	Pts	Qualification
1	Ireland	4	4	0	0	135	34	+101	15	1	17	Advanced to the quarter-finals and qualified for the 2015 Rugby World Cup
2	Australia	4	3	0	1	173	48	+125	25	3	15	Advanced to the quarter-finals and qualified for the 2015 Rugby World Cup
3	Italy	4	2	0	2	92	95	−3	13	2	10	Eliminated but qualified for 2015 Rugby World Cup
4	United States	4	1	0	3	38	122	−84	4	0	4	
5	Russia	4	0	0	4	57	196	−139	8	1	1	

All times are local New Zealand time (UTC+12 until 24 September, UTC+13 from 25 September)

11 September 2011
15:30

Australia	32–6	Italy
Try: Alexander 50' m Ashley-Cooper 55' c O'Connor 58' c Ioane 66' c Con: O'Connor (3/4); Pen: Cooper (2/3) 19', 30'	Report	Pen: Mi. Bergamasco (2/3) 38', 40+'

North Harbour Stadium, Auckland
Attendance: 25,731
Referee: Alain Rolland (Ireland)

20 September 2011
19:30

Italy	53–17	Russia
Try: Parisse 6' c Toniolatti (2) 13' m, 23' c Benvenuti (2) 16' m, 48' m Penalty try 29' c Gori 37' c McLean 64' m Zanni 77' m Con: Bocchino (4/6); Benvenuti (0/3); Pen: Bocchino (0/1)	Report	Try: Yanyushkin 34' c Ostroushko 50' m Makovetski 71' m Con: Rachkov (1/3)

Trafalgar Park, Nelson
Attendance: 12,418
Referee: Wayne Barnes (England)

27 September 2011
19:30

Italy	27–10	United States
Try: Parisse 3' c Orquera 30' m Castrogiovanni 40' m Penalty try 66' c Con: Mi. Bergamasco (2/4); Pen: Mi. Bergamasco (1/1) 22'	Report	Try: Wyles 18' c Con: Wyles (1/1); Pen: Wyles (1/1) 28'

Trafalgar Park, Nelson
Attendance: 14,997
Referee: George Clancy (Ireland)

2 October 2011
20:30

Ireland	36–6	Italy
Try: O'Driscoll 47' c Earls (2) 52' c, 80+' c Con: O'Gara (2/2); Sexton (1/1); Pen: O'Gara (4/5) 7', 18', 35', 44'; Sexton (1/1) 70'	Report	Pen: Mi. Bergamasco (2/3) 11', 21'

Otago Stadium, Dunedin
Attendance: 28,027
Referee: Jonathan Kaplan (South Africa)

=== 2015 Rugby World Cup ===
Pos	Team	Pld	W	D	L	PF	PA	PD	T	B	Pts	Qualification
1	Ireland	4	4	0	0	134	35	+99	16	2	18	Advanced to the quarter-finals and qualified for the 2019 Rugby World Cup
2	France	4	3	0	1	120	63	+57	12	2	14	Advanced to the quarter-finals and qualified for the 2019 Rugby World Cup
3	Italy	4	2	0	2	74	88	−14	7	2	10	Eliminated but qualified for 2019 Rugby World Cup
4	Romania	4	1	0	3	60	129	−69	7	0	4	
5	Canada	4	0	0	4	58	131	−73	7	2	2	

19 September 2015	France	32–10	Italy	Twickenham Stadium, London
26 September 2015	Italy	23–18	Canada	Elland Road, Leeds
4 October 2015	Ireland	16–9	Italy	Olympic Stadium, London
11 October 2015	Italy	32–22	Romania	Sandy Park, Exeter

=== 2019 Rugby World Cup ===
Pool B

Pos	Team	Pld	W	D	L	PF	PA	PD	T	B	Pts	Qualification
1	New Zealand	4	3	1	0	157	22	+135	22	2	16	Advanced to the quarter-finals and qualified for the 2023 Rugby World Cup
2	South Africa	4	3	0	1	185	36	+149	27	3	15	Advanced to the quarter-finals and qualified for the 2023 Rugby World Cup
3	Italy	4	2	1	1	98	78	+20	14	2	12	Eliminated but qualified for 2023 Rugby World Cup
4	Namibia	4	0	1	3	34	175	−141	3	0	2	
5	Canada	4	0	1	3	14	177	−163	2	0	2	

22 September 2019
14:15 JST (UTC+09)

(1 BP) Italy	47–22	Namibia
Try: Penalty try 11'; Allan 26' c Tebaldi 40+1' c Bellini 44' c Canna 47' c Polledri 70' m Minozzi 76' c Con: Allan (3/3) 27', 40+2', 45'; Canna (2/3) 48', 77'	Report	Try: Stevens 6' c Greyling 57' m Plato 79' c Con: Loubser (2/3) 7', 80'; Pen: Loubser (1/1) 51'

Hanazono Rugby Stadium, Higashiōsaka
Attendance: 20,354
Referee: Nic Berry (Australia)

26 September 2019
16:45 JST (UTC+09)

(1 BP) Italy	48–7	Canada
Try: Steyn 8' c Budd 13' c Negri 44' c Penalty try 59'; Bellini 62' m Zani 73' c Minozzi 79' m Con: Allan (3/4) 9', 14', 45'; Canna (1/2) 74'; Pen: Allan (1/1) 3'	Report	Try: Coe 69' c Con: Nelson (1/1) 71'

Fukuoka Hakatanomori Stadium, Fukuoka
Attendance: 16,984
Referee: Nigel Owens (Wales)

4 October 2019
18:45 JST (UTC+09)

(1 BP) South Africa	49–3	Italy
Try: Kolbe (2) 6' c, 53' m Mbonambi 27' c Am 58' c Mapimpi 68' c Snyman 76' m Marx 80+3' m Con: Pollard (4/7) 7', 28', 60', 69'; Pen: Pollard (2/2) 12', 51'	Report	Pen: Allan (1/1) 9'

Shizuoka Stadium Ecopa, Fukuroi
Attendance: 44,148
Referee: Wayne Barnes (England)

12 October 2019
13:45 JST (UTC+09)

New Zealand	0–0 (Cancelled)	Italy

Toyota Stadium, Toyota
Referee: Luke Pearce (England)

Notes:

- As a result of inclement weather caused by Typhoon Hagibis this match was cancelled and awarded as a 0–0 draw.

=== 2023 Rugby World Cup ===
Pool A

Pos	Team	Pld	W	D	L	PF	PA	PD	TF	TA	B	Pts	Qualification
1	France (H)	4	4	0	0	210	32	+178	27	5	2	18	Advance to knockout stage, and qualification to the 2027 Men's Rugby World Cup
2	New Zealand	4	3	0	1	253	47	+206	38	4	3	15	Advance to knockout stage, and qualification to the 2027 Men's Rugby World Cup
3	Italy	4	2	0	2	114	181	−67	15	25	2	10	Qualification to the 2027 Men's Rugby World Cup
4	Uruguay	4	1	0	3	65	164	−99	9	21	1	5	
5	Namibia	4	0	0	4	37	255	−218	3	37	0	0	

Source: World Rugby
Rules for classification: Pool stage tiebreakers
(H) Host

9 September 2023
13:00 CEST (UTC+2)

(1 BP) Italy	52–8	Namibia
Try: L. Cannone 11' c P. Garbisi 15' c Lamb 46' c Capuozzo 55' c Faiva 74' c Zuliani 78' c Odogwu 80+3' c Con: Allan (7/7) 12', 16', 48', 57', 75', 79', 80+4'; Pen: Allan (1/1) 8'	Report	Try: Mouton 21' m Pen: Swanepoel (1/2) 4'

Stade Geoffroy-Guichard, Saint-Étienne
Attendance: 35,515
Referee: Andrew Brace (Ireland)

20 September 2023
17:45 CEST (UTC+2)

(1 BP) Italy	38–17	Uruguay
Try: Pani 7' c Lamaro 46' c Ioane 52' c L. Cannone 56' c Brex 61' c Con: Allan (5/5) 8', 47', 53', 57', 62'; Pen: P. Garbisi (1/1) 70'	Report	Try: Penalty try 27'; Freitas 37' c Con: Etcheverry (1/1) 38'; Drop: Etcheverry (1/1) 42'

Stade de Nice, Nice
Attendance: 28,627
Referee: Angus Gardner (Australia)

29 September 2023
21:00 CEST (UTC+2)

(1 BP) New Zealand	96–17	Italy
Try: Jordan (2) 7' c, 70' c Smith (3) 17' c, 27' c, 34' c Tele'a 19' c Savea (2) 22' c, 40+5' c Retallick 50' c Papalii 55' c Coles (2) 61' m, 73' c McKenzie 67' c Lienert-Brown 76' c Con: Mo'unga (9/10) 8', 18', 20, 23', 28', 35', 40+6', 51', 57'; McKenzie (4/4) 69', 71', 74', 77'	Report	Try: Capuozzo 48' c Ioane 80+1' c Con: Allan (1/1) 49'; P. Garbisi (1/1) 80+3'; Pen: Allan (1/1) 10'

Parc Olympique Lyonnais, Décines-Charpieu
Attendance: 57,672
Referee: Matthew Carley (England)

6 October 2023
21:00 CEST (UTC+2)

(1 BP) France	60–7	Italy
Try: Penaud (2) 2' c, 38' c Bielle-Biarrey 13' c Ramos 22' c Jalibert 47' c Mauvaka 54' c Moefana (2) 64' c, 76' m Con: Ramos (6/6) 4', 14', 23', 39', 48', 55'; Jaminet (1/2) 65'; Pen: Ramos (1/2) 7'; Jaminet (1/1) 80+1'	Report	Try: Zuliani 71' c Con: Allan (1/1) 72'

Parc Olympique Lyonnais, Décines-Charpieu
Referee: Karl Dickson (England)

== Overall record ==
Against	Played	Win	Draw	Lost	Win %
Argentina	2	1	0	1	50
Australia	1	0	0	1	0
Canada	3	3	0	0	100
England	3	0	0	3	0
Fiji	1	1	0	0	100
France	2	0	0	2	0
Ireland	2	0	0	2	0
Namibia	2	2	0	0	100
New Zealand	6	0	1	6	0
Portugal	1	1	0	0	100
Romania	2	2	0	0	100
Russia	1	1	0	0	100
Samoa	1	0	0	1	0
Scotland	1	0	0	1	0
South Africa	1	0	0	1	0
Tonga	2	1	0	1	50
Uruguay	1	1	0	0	100
United States	2	2	0	0	100
Wales	1	0	0	1	0
Overall	33	15	1	20	45.45

- As a result of inclement weather caused by Typhoon Hagibis the match between New Zealand and Italy was not played but was awarded as a 0–0 draw.

== Team records ==
Most points in a tournament

- 114 – 2023
- 98 – 2019
- 92 – 2011

Most points in a game

- 53 vs Russia (2011)
- 52 vs Namibia (2023)
- 48 vs Canada (2019)

Biggest winning margin

- 44 vs Namibia (2023)
- 41 Vs Canada (2019)
- 36 vs Russia (2011)

Highest score against

- 101 vs New Zealand (1999)
- 96 vs New Zealand (2023)
- 76 vs New Zealand (2007)

Biggest losing margin

- 98 vs New Zealand (1999)
- 79 vs New Zealand (2023)
- 64 vs New Zealand (1987)

Most tries in a tournament

- 15 – 2023
- 14 – 2019
- 13 – 2011

Most tries in a game

- 9 vs Russia (2011)
- 7 vs Namibia (2019)
- 7 vs Namibia (2023)
- 7 vs Canada (2019)

== Individual records ==
Most appearances

- 15 – Sergio Parisse (2003, 2007, 2011, 2015, 2019)
- 14 – Martin Castrogiovanni (2003, 2007, 2011, 2015)
- 13 – Alessandro Troncon (1995, 1999, 2003, 2007)
- 13 – Mauro Bergamasco (1999, 2003, 2007, 2011, 2015)
- 12 – Andrea Masi (2003, 2007, 2011, 2015)

Most points overall

- 101 – Tommaso Allan (2015, 2019, 2023)
- 98 – Diego Dominguez (1991, 1995, 1999)
- 50 – Rima Wakarua (2003)
- 32 – David Bortolussi (2007)
- 24 – Mirco Bergamasco (2003, 2007, 2011)

Most points in a game

- 21 – Diego Dominguez vs Argentina (1995)
- 21 – Rima Wakarua vs Tonga (2003)
- 20 – Diego Dominguez vs Tonga (1999)
- 17 – Tommaso Allan vs Romania (2015)
- 17 – Tommaso Allan vs Namibia (2023)

Most tries overall

- 5 – Marcello Cuttitta (1987, 1991, 1995)
- 4 – Paolo Vaccari (1991, 1995, 1999)
- 3 – Sergio Parisse (2003, 2007, 2011, 2015, 2019)

Most tries in a game

- 2 – Denis Dallan vs Tonga (2003)
- 2 – Andrea Masi vs Portugal (2007)
- 2 – Giulio Toniolatti vs Russia (2011)
- 2 – Tommaso Benvenuti vs Russia (2011)

Most penalty goals

- 19 – Diego Domínguez (1991, 1995, 1999)
- 14 – Rima Wakarua (2003)
- 13 – Tommaso Allan (2015, 2019, 2023)
- 8 – Mirco Bergamasco (2003, 2007, 2011)
- 5 – David Bortolussi (2007)

Most penalty goals in a game

- 6 – Diego Domínguez vs Tonga (1999)
- 5 – Rima Wakarua vs Wales (2003)
- 5 – Rima Wakarua vs Tonga (2003)
- 4 – Diego Domínguez vs Argentina (1995)
- 4 – David Bortolussi vs Portugal (2007)

== Hosting ==
The Rugby World Cup is held every four years, and tends to alternate between the northern and southern hemispheres. Italy has yet to host the World Cup, although the Italian Rugby Federation made unsuccessful bids for the 2015 and 2019 competitions.
