= Niccolò Cannone =

Italy international rugby union player

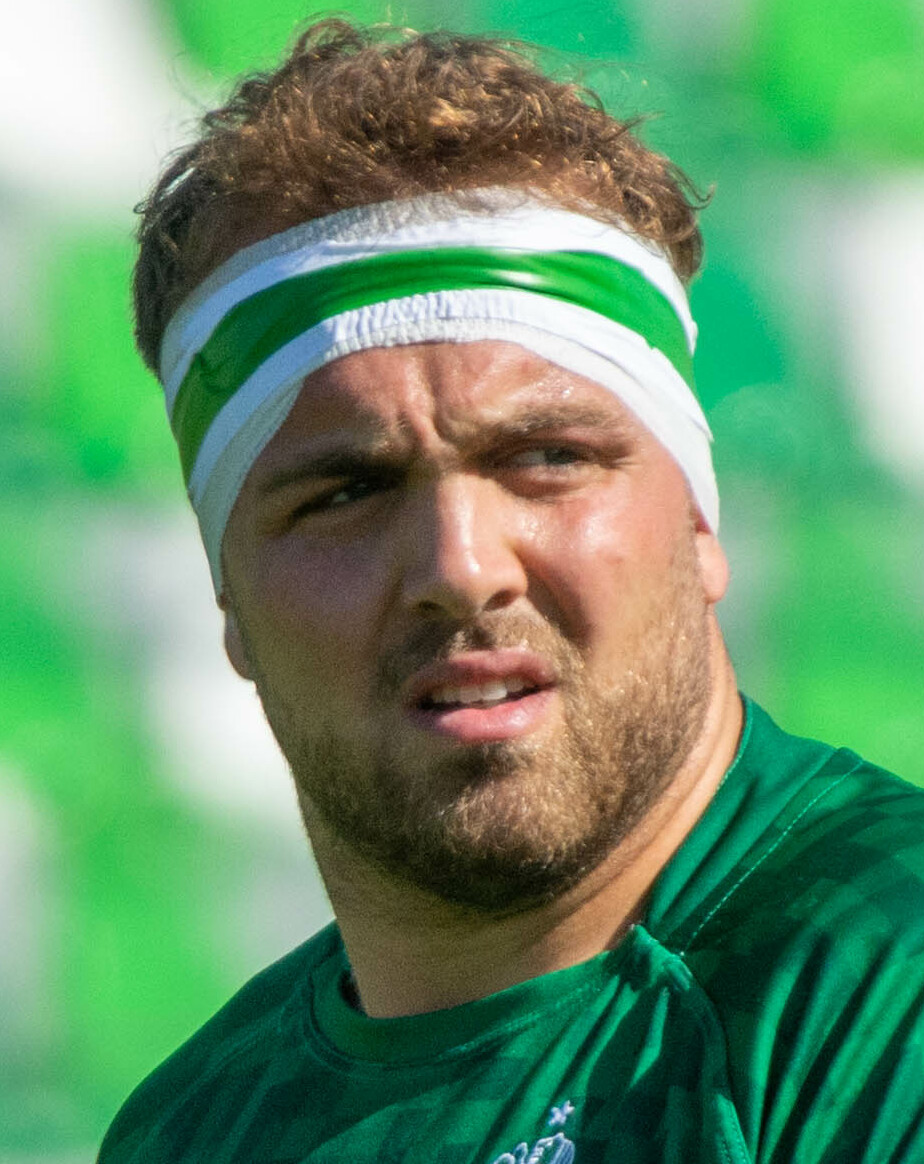
- Cannone in April 2023
- Born: 17 May 1998 (age 28) Florence, Italy
- Height: 195 cm (6 ft 5 in)
- Weight: 120 kg (265 lb; 18 st 13 lb)
- Notable relative: Lorenzo Cannone (brother)

Rugby union career
- Position: Lock
- Current team: Benetton
Youth career
- Florentia Rugby
Senior career
Years	Team	Apps	(Points)
2017–2020	Petrarca	37	(20)
2019–2020	→Benetton	17	(15)
2020–	Benetton	90	(35)
- Correct as of 29 Aug 2026
International career
Years	Team	Apps	(Points)
2017–2018	Italy U20	17	(10)
2020–	Italy	65	(10)
- Correct as of 29 Aug 2026

Niccolò Cannone (born 17 May 1998) is an Italian professional rugby union player who primarily plays lock for Benetton of the United Rugby Championship.

== Professional career ==
Cannone has previously played for clubs such as Petrarca in the past. For 2018–19 Pro14 and 2019–20 Pro14 season, he named as Permit Player for Benetton in Pro 14.

After playing for Italy Under 20 in 2017 and 2018, in 2020 Cannone was named in the Italy squad for the Six Nations 2020, having made his test debut against Wales during the 2020 Six Nations Championship.

On 22 August 2023, he was named in the Italy's 33-man squad for the 2023 Rugby World Cup.
