= Joseph Stanley =

Joseph Stanley may refer to:

- Joseph Stanley-Brown, secretary to president James A. Garfield
- Joseph Stanley Kimmitt, secretary of the United States senate
- Joseph Stanley Snowden, British politician

== See also ==
- Joe Stanley (disambiguation)
