= Jason Benade =

Namibian rugby union player (born 1995)

- Full name: Jason Martino Benade
- Born: 16 April 1995 (age 31) Rehoboth, Namibia
- Height: 188 cm (6 ft 2 in)
- Weight: 115 kg (254 lb; 18 st 2 lb)
- University: University of Namibia

Rugby union career
- Position: Loose-head Prop
- Current team: University of Namibia
Senior career
Years	Team	Apps	(Points)
2017-2019	Welwitschias	4	(0)
- Correct as of 6 October 2023
International career
Years	Team	Apps	(Points)
2015	Namibia under-20	??	(??)
2016-	Namibia	17	(0)
- Correct as of 6 October 20223

Jason Martino Benade (born 16 April 1995) is a Namibian rugby union player who plays primarily as a loose-head prop. He formerly played for the Welwitschias in the SuperSport Rugby Challenge.

== International career ==
He made his international debut against Spain in 2018. In 2023 he was named part of the Namibia squad for the Rugby World Cup in France where he featured in all of their games including two starts against the All Blacks and Uruguay.
