= Federico Zani =

Italian rugby union player

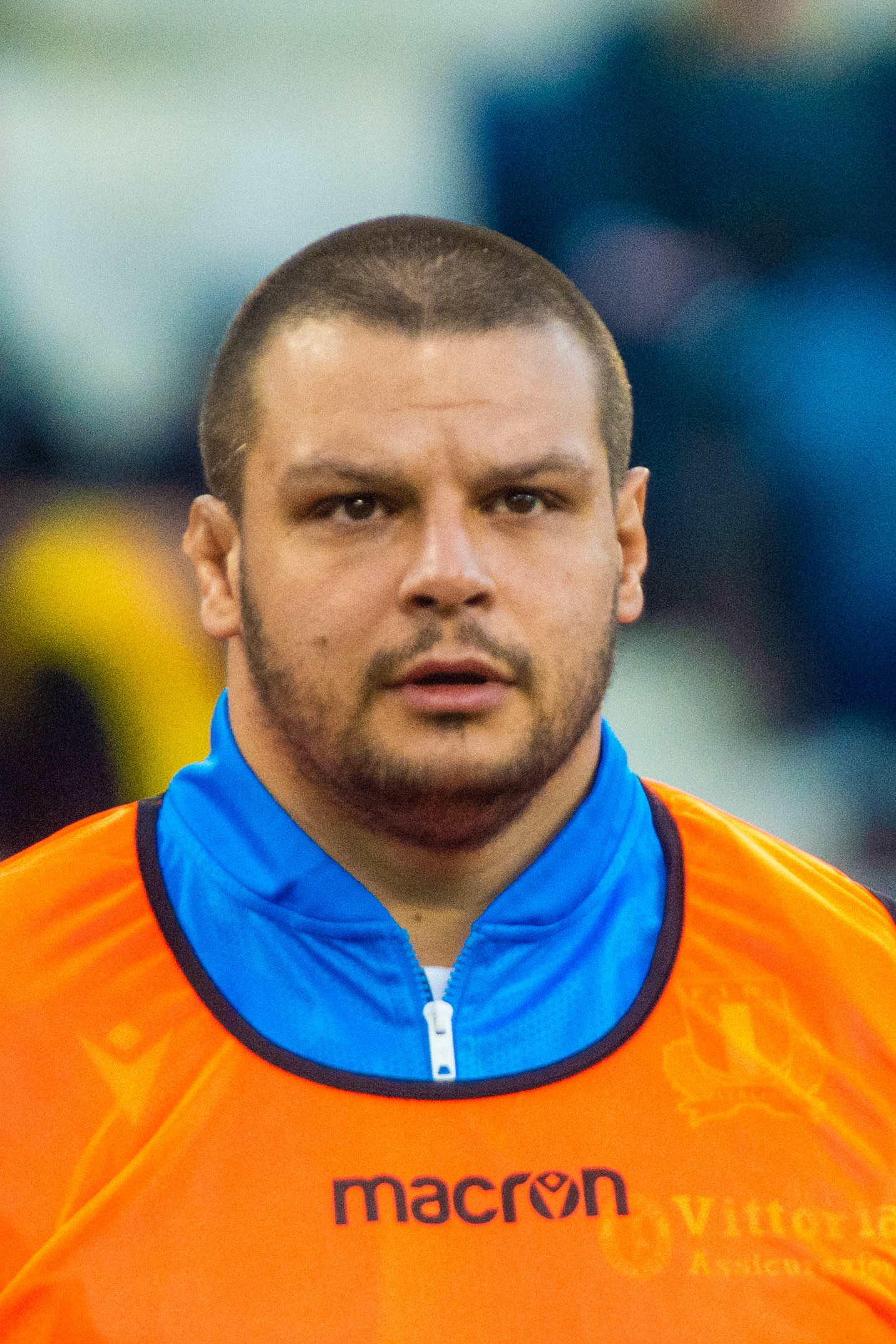
- Zani in 2023
- Born: 9 April 1989 (age 37) Parma
- Height: 1.78 m (5 ft 10 in)
- Weight: 110 kg (17 st 5 lb; 243 lb)

Rugby union career
- Position: Prop
- Current team: Benetton
Youth career
- 2006−09: Colorno
Senior career
Years	Team	Apps	(Points)
2008−10	Colorno	10	(0)
2010−11	Gran Ducato	8	(0)
2011−14	Cus Verona	51	(70)
2014−15	Petrarca	18	(10)
2015−16	Mogliano	17	(10)
2016	→Benetton	1	(0)
2016−2024	Benetton	81	(10)
- Correct as of 21 Jan 2023
International career
Years	Team	Apps	(Points)
- Italy Under 20
2015−2021	Italy A	7	(0)
2017−2023	Italy	25	(10)
- Correct as of 6 Oct 2023
Coaching career
- Years: Team
- 2023–: Red Panthers (assistant coach)

Federico Zani (born 9 April 1989) is an Italian rugby union player. His usual position was as a prop, and he has been playing in the United Rugby Championship for Benetton since 2016. From summer 2023, he is the Coach of woman section of Red Panthers Treviso.

Under contract with Mogliano, in 2015–16 Pro12 season, he was named as Additional Player for Benetton Treviso in Pro 12.

He played for Benetton from 2016 to 2023–24 United Rugby Championship season; in March 2022 it was announced that his contract was extended until the end of 2024.

In 2015 and 2016, Zani was named in the Emerging Italy squad from 2017 he was also named in the Italy squad. On 18 August 2019, he was named in the final 31-man squad for the 2019 Rugby World Cup.

On 8 November 2021, he was named in the Italy A squad for the 2021 end-of-year rugby union internationals.

On 22 August 2023, he was named in Italy's 33-man squad for the 2023 Rugby World Cup.

Since 2023, he represented Italy on 25 occasions with 2 tries.
