= Lorenzo Cannone =

Italy international rugby union player

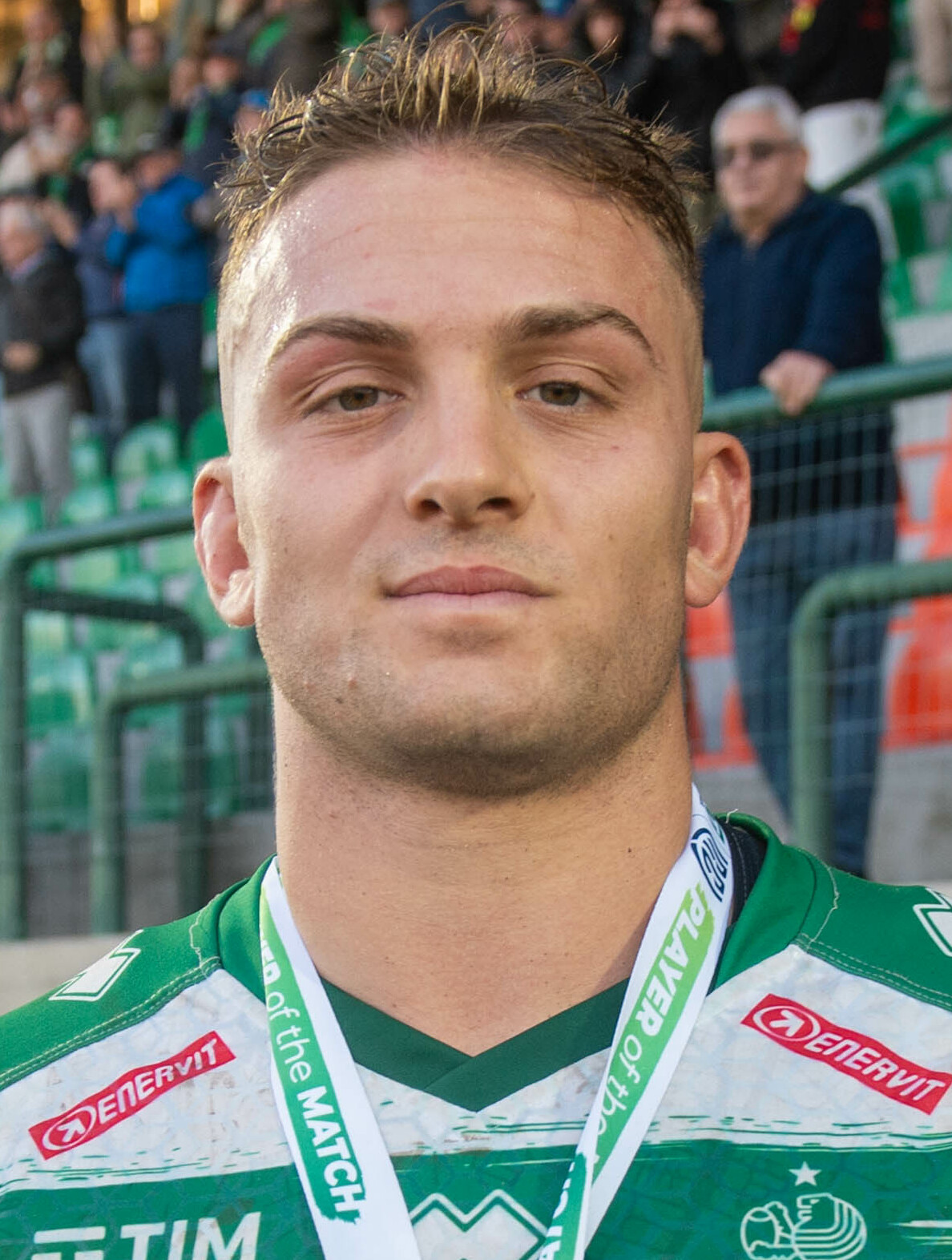
- Cannone in 2023
- Born: 28 January 2001 (age 25) Florence, Italy
- Height: 188 cm (6 ft 2 in)
- Weight: 110 kg (243 lb; 17 st 5 lb)
- Notable relative: Niccolò Cannone (brother)

Rugby union career
- Position(s): Flanker, Number 8
- Current team: Benetton
Youth career
- Bombo Rugby Firenze
- –: Florentia Rugby
Senior career
Years	Team	Apps	(Points)
2019−2020	F.I.R. Academy		
2020–2021	Petrarca	16	(0)
2021–	Benetton	71	(40)
- Correct as of 30 Aug 2026
International career
Years	Team	Apps	(Points)
2020–2021	Italy U20	8	(0)
2021–2022	Italy A	4	(10)
2022–	Italy	40	(20)
- Correct as of 30 Aug 2026

Lorenzo Cannone (born 28 January 2001) is an Italian professional rugby union player who primarily plays number eight for Benetton of the United Rugby Championship.

== Professional career ==
Cannone has previously played for clubs such as Petrarca in the past. He signed for Benetton in June 2021 ahead of the 2021–22 United Rugby Championship. He made his debut in Round 1 of the 2021–22 season against the Stormers.

In 2020 and 2021 Lorenzo Cannone was named in Italy U20s squad for annual Six Nations Under 20s Championship. On 14 October 2021, he was selected by Alessandro Troncon to be part of an Italy A 28-man squad for the 2021 end-of-year rugby union internationals. On 10 October 2022 he was selected by Kieran Crowley to be part of an Italy 33-man squad for the 2022 November Internationals matches against He made his debut against Samoa .

On 22 August 2023, he was named in the Italy's 33-man squad for the 2023 Rugby World Cup.
