= Santiago Arata =

Uruguayan rugby union footballer

- Full name: Santiago Arata Perrone
- Born: 2 September 1996 (age 30) Montevideo, Uruguay
- Height: 170 cm (5 ft 7 in)
- Weight: 75 kg (165 lb)
- School: Liceo Francés Jules Supervielle
- University: Universidad de Montevideo
- Occupation: Profesional Rugby Player

Rugby union career
- Position: Scrum-half
- Current team: Castres
Youth career
- Lycée Français
Amateur team(s)
Years	Team	Apps	(Points)
2014–2019	Old Christians Club		
Senior career
Years	Team	Apps	(Points)
2019	Houston Sabercats	3	(5)
2020	Peñarol	0	(5)
2020–	Castres	98	(80)
- Correct as of 24 February 2025
International career
Years	Team	Apps	(Points)
2015−2016	Uruguay U20s	7	(26)
2016–	Uruguay	45	(71)
- Correct as of 14 October 2022

Santiago Arata Perrone (born 2 September 1996) is a Uruguayan rugby union player who plays as a scrum-half for Castres in the French Top 14. He also represents Uruguay internationally.

He made his international debut for Uruguay against Canada on 6 February 2016. He was included in the Uruguayan squad for the 2019 Rugby World Cup which was held in Japan for the first time and also marked his first World Cup appearance.

On 28 May 2020, Arata signed a major professional contract with French side Castres in the Top 14 competition on a two-year deal from the 2020–24 season.
