= Manuel Zuliani =

Italy international rugby union player

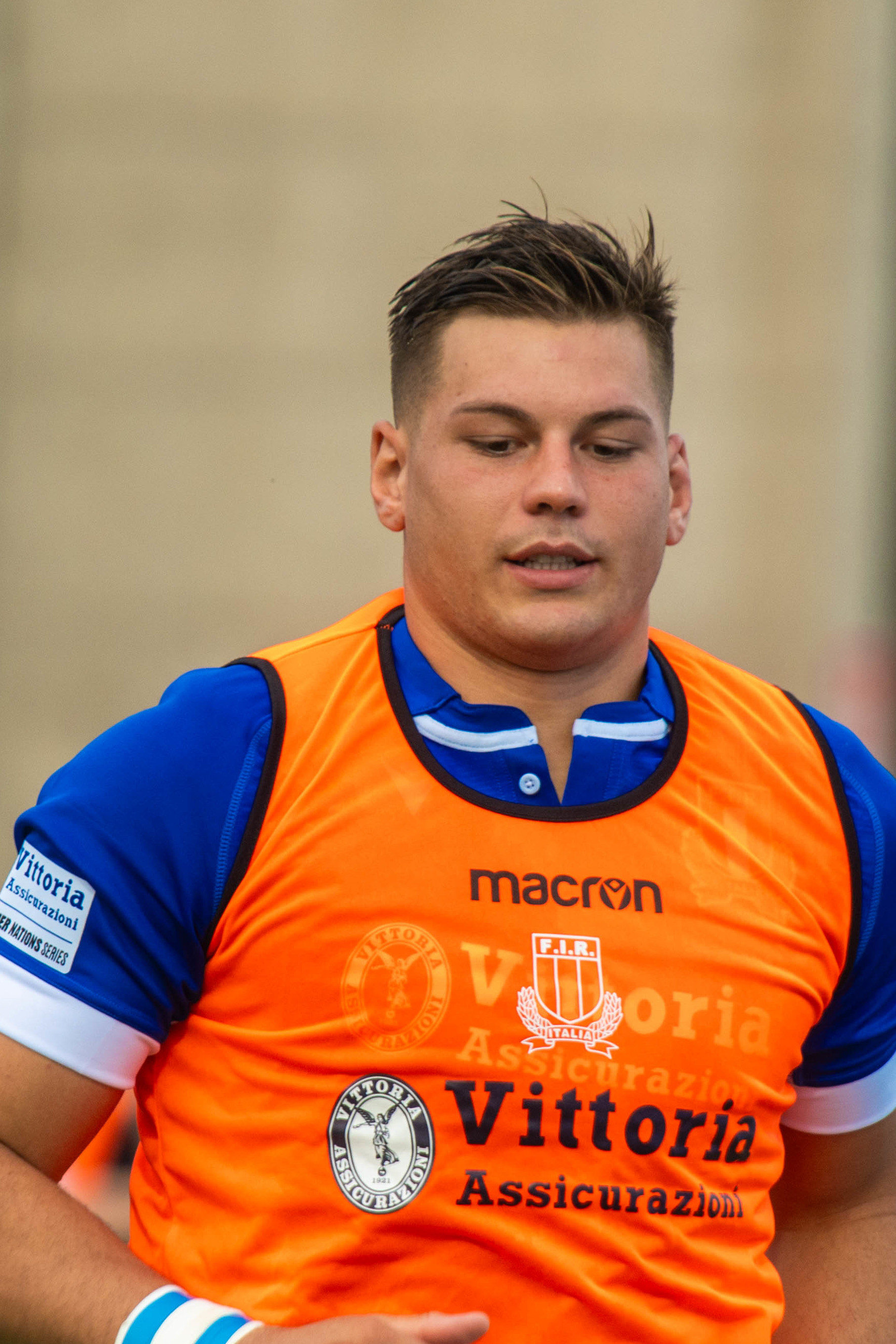
- Zuliani in 2023
- Born: 26 April 2000 (age 26) Castelfranco Veneto, Italy
- Height: 190 cm (6 ft 3 in)
- Weight: 110 kg (243 lb; 17 st 5 lb)

Rugby union career
- Position: Flanker
- Current team: Benetton
Youth career
- Rugby Paese
Senior career
Years	Team	Apps	(Points)
2018–2020	F.I.R. Academy		
2020	→Calvisano	1	(0)
2020–2021	Mogliano	8	(0)
2020–2021	→Benetton	19	(0)
2021–	Benetton	65	(25)
- Correct as of 29 Aug 2026
International career
Years	Team	Apps	(Points)
2019–2020	Italy U20	3	(5)
2022–	Italy	43	(15)
- Correct as of 29 Aug 2026

Manuel Zuliani (Italian pronunciation: [ˈmaːnwel dzuˈljaːni]; born 26 April 2000) is an Italian professional rugby union player who primarily plays flanker for Benetton of the United Rugby Championship.

== Professional career ==
Selected for F.I.R. Academy, he represented Calvisano in the 2019–20 European Rugby Challenge Cup as Additional Player. Under contract with Mogliano, for the last part of 2019–20 Pro14 season and for the 2020–21 Pro14 season, he was named as Permit Player for Benetton.

In January 2019, Zuliani was also named in the Italy Under 20 squad for the 2019 Six Nations Under 20s Championship and in 2020 the squad for the 2020 Six Nations Under 20s Championship.

On the 13 January 2022, he was selected by Kieran Crowley to be part of an Italy 33-man squad for the 2022 Six Nations Championship. He made his debut against France.

On 22 August 2023, he was named in the Italy's 33-man squad for the 2023 Rugby World Cup.
