= Joe Stanley =

Joe Stanley may refer to:

- Joe Stanley (rugby union) (born 1957), New Zealand rugby union player
- Joe Stanley (1880s outfielder), American baseball player, outfielder for the 1884 Baltimore Monumentals
- Joe Stanley (1900s outfielder) (1881–1967), American baseball player for the Washington Senators, Boston Beaneaters and Chicago Cubs
- Joe Stanley (colonel) (1908–2012), American pilot, colonel

== See also ==
- Joseph Stanley (disambiguation)
