= Peato Mauvaka =

France international rugby union player

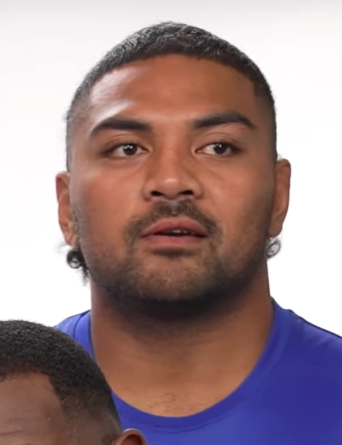
- Mauvaka representing France in 2022
- Born: 10 January 1997 (age 29) Nouméa, New Caledonia
- Height: 1.84 m (6 ft 0 in)
- Weight: 124 kg (273 lb; 19 st 7 lb)

Rugby union career
- Position: Hooker
- Current team: Toulouse
Senior career
| Years | Team | Apps | (Points) |
| 2016– | Toulouse | 132 | (110) |
- Correct as of 28 June 2024
International career
| Years | Team | Apps | (Points) |
| 2016–2017 | France U20 | 15 | (30) |
| 2019– | France | 46 | (55) |
- Correct as of 14 March 2026

Peato Mauvaka (born 10 January 1997) is a French professional rugby union player who plays as a hooker for Top 14 club Toulouse and the France national team. Born in Nouméa, New Caledonia to Wallisian parents, he began his professional career for Toulouse in 2016.

== Career statistics ==
=== List of international tries ===
International tries
| No. | Date | Venue | Opponent | Score | Result | Competition |
|---|---|---|---|---|---|---|
| 1 | 6 November 2021 | Stade de France, Saint-Denis, France | Argentina | 24–13 | 29–20 | 2021 Autumn internationals |
| 2 | 14 November 2021 | Matmut Atlantique, Bordeaux, France | Georgia | 29–10 | 41–15 | 2021 Autumn internationals |
| 3 | 14 November 2021 | Matmut Atlantique, Bordeaux, France | Georgia | 41–15 | 41–15 | 2021 Autumn internationals |
| 4 | 20 November 2021 | Stade de France, Saint-Denis, France | New Zealand | 5–0 | 40–25 | 2021 Autumn internationals |
| 5 | 20 November 2021 | Stade de France, Saint-Denis, France | New Zealand | 22–6 | 40–25 | 2021 Autumn internationals |
| 6 | 19 August 2023 | Stade de la Beaujoire, Nantes, France | Fiji | 14–3 | 34–17 | 2023 Rugby World Cup warm-up matches |
| 7 | 14 September 2023 | Stade Pierre-Mauroy, Lille, France | Uruguay | 18–12 | 27–12 | 2023 Rugby World Cup |
| 8 | 6 October 2023 | Parc Olympique Lyonnais, Décines-Charpieu, France | Italy | 43–0 | 60–7 | 2023 Rugby World Cup |
| 9 | 15 October 2023 | Stade de France, Saint-Denis, France | South Africa | 12–12 | 28–29 | 2023 Rugby World Cup |
| 10 | 9 November 2024 | Stade de France, Saint-Denis, France | Japan | 31–0 | 52–12 | 2024 Autumn internationals |
| 11 | 23 February 2025 | Stadio Olimpico, Rome, Italy | Italy | 10–12 | 24–73 | 2025 Six Nations |

== Honours ==
France

- 3x Six Nations Championship: 2022, 2025, 2026
- 1× Grand Slam: 2022

Toulouse

- 2× European Rugby Champions Cup: 2021, 2024
- 4× Top 14: 2019, 2021, 2023, 2024
