= JC Greyling =

Namibia international rugby union player

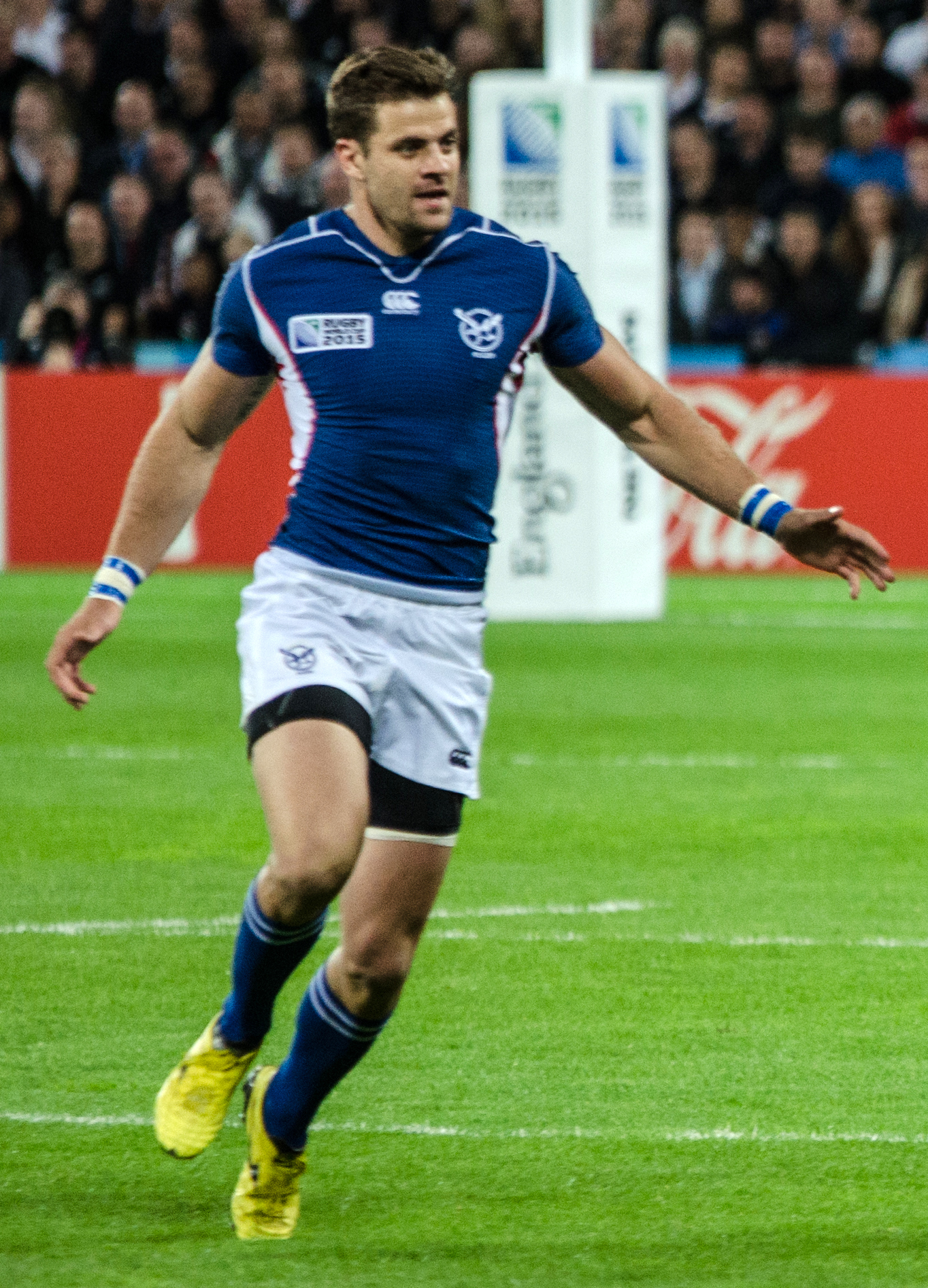
- Full name: Johan Corné Greyling
- Born: 21 June 1991 (age 35) Okahandja, Namibia
- Height: 1.87 m (6 ft 1 1/2 in)
- Weight: 92 kg (14 st 7 lb; 203 lb)
- School: Hoërskool Klerksdorp

Rugby union career
- Position: Centre
Youth career
- 2010–2012: Falcons
- 2011: Old Wesley
Amateur team(s)
Years	Team	Apps	(Points)
2013–2015	Old Wesley		
Senior career
Years	Team	Apps	(Points)
2012	Falcons	13	(10)
2015–2016	Welwitschias	6	(0)
2016	Eastern Province Kings	4	(5)
2017–present	Welwitschias	13	(25)
- Correct as of 22 July 2018
International career
Years	Team	Apps	(Points)
2014–present	Namibia	32	(101)
- Correct as of 14 September 2019

Johan Corné Greyling (born 21 June 1991) is a Namibian professional rugby union player, currently playing with the Welwitschias. He was named in Namibia's squad for the 2015 Rugby World Cup.
