= 2023 Rugby World Cup =

Tenth edition of the men's Rugby World Cup

French: Coupe du monde de rugby 2023
- We Are Rugby #WeAre2023!

Tournament details
- Host nation: France
- Venue: 9 (in 9 host cities)
- Dates: 8 September – 28 October
- No. of nations: 20 (49 qualifying)

Final positions
- Champions: South Africa (4th title)
- Runner-up: New Zealand
- Third place: England

Tournament statistics
- Matches played: 48
- Attendance: 2,437,208 (50,775 per match)
- Tries scored: 325 (average 6.77 per match)
- Top scorer(s): (England) Owen Farrell (75)
- Most tries: (New Zealand) Will Jordan (8)
- Points scored: 2,610 (average 54.38 per match)

The 2023 Rugby World Cup (French: Coupe du monde de rugby 2023) was the tenth men's Rugby World Cup, the quadrennial world championship for national rugby union teams. It took place in France from 8 September to 28 October 2023 in nine venues across the country. The opening game and the final took place at the Stade de France, north of Paris. The tournament was held in the bicentenary year of the purported invention of the sport by William Webb Ellis.

The tournament was scheduled to last six weeks, but in February 2021 World Rugby added a week to provide additional rest days for player welfare. This meant that teams had a minimum of five days' rest for all matches. It was the fourth time France has hosted the Rugby World Cup, having previously done so in 2007 and co-hosted the 1991 Rugby World Cup and 1999 Rugby World Cup with England, Ireland, Scotland and Wales. This was the last tournament to feature 20 teams taking part, as the tournament will be expanded to include 24 teams in 2027.

The Rugby World Cup adopted a sound identity, used during key moments of the tournament, including the arrival of spectators, the players' entrance and after tries.

The defending champions were South Africa, who defeated England in the 2019 Rugby World Cup final. South Africa retained their title by defeating New Zealand in the final. In doing so, they became the first men's team to win the tournament four times and they remain the only team to ever win the World Cup after losing a match in the pool stage, as well as the first team to win successive World Cup titles away from home. The result also marked their second victory over New Zealand in a final (winning 15–12 a.e.t. in 1995), and also their second victory in a final on French soil (defeating England 15–6 in 2007). As well as winning the World Cup after losing a pool game for the second consecutive time, they won each of their knockout games against France, England and New Zealand by a margin of 1 point.

Chile made their first appearance in the tournament. Portugal returned for their second appearance, 16 years after their debut in 2007, also in France.

== Host selection ==
World Rugby requested that any members wishing to host the 2023 event were to submit an expression of interest by June 2015. A total of six unions responded. The Italian Rugby Federation were among the members interested, but withdrew from their bid on 28 September 2016. The Argentine Rugby Union and USA Rugby both expressed their interest in hosting the event but ultimately decided against a formal bid. Three bids were officially submitted to World Rugby by the June 2017 deadline.

On 15 November 2017, the French Rugby Federation bid was chosen ahead of bids by the South African Rugby Union and the Irish Rugby Football Union. France had launched its bid on 9 February 2017.

== Venues ==
=== Stadia ===
On 17 March 2017, twelve host cities were selected. This list was later reduced to nine cities (excluding Paris, Montpellier, and Lens):

Paris (Saint-Denis)	Marseille	Lyon (Décines-Charpieu)	Lille (Villeneuve-d'Ascq)
Stade de France (Note: Stadium/site used in the 2007 Rugby World Cup.) (Note: Stadium/site used in the 1999 Rugby World Cup.)	Stade de Marseille	OL Stadium	Stade Pierre-Mauroy
Capacity: 80,698	Capacity: 67,394	Capacity: 59,186	Capacity: 50,186
Bordeaux	2023 Rugby World Cup is located in France		
Stade de Bordeaux	2023 Rugby World Cup is located in France		
Capacity: 42,115	2023 Rugby World Cup is located in France		
Saint-Étienne	Nice	Nantes	Toulouse
Stade Geoffroy-Guichard	Stade de Nice	Stade de la Beaujoire	Stadium de Toulouse
Capacity: 41,965	Capacity: 35,624	Capacity: 35,322	Capacity: 33,150

=== Team base camps ===
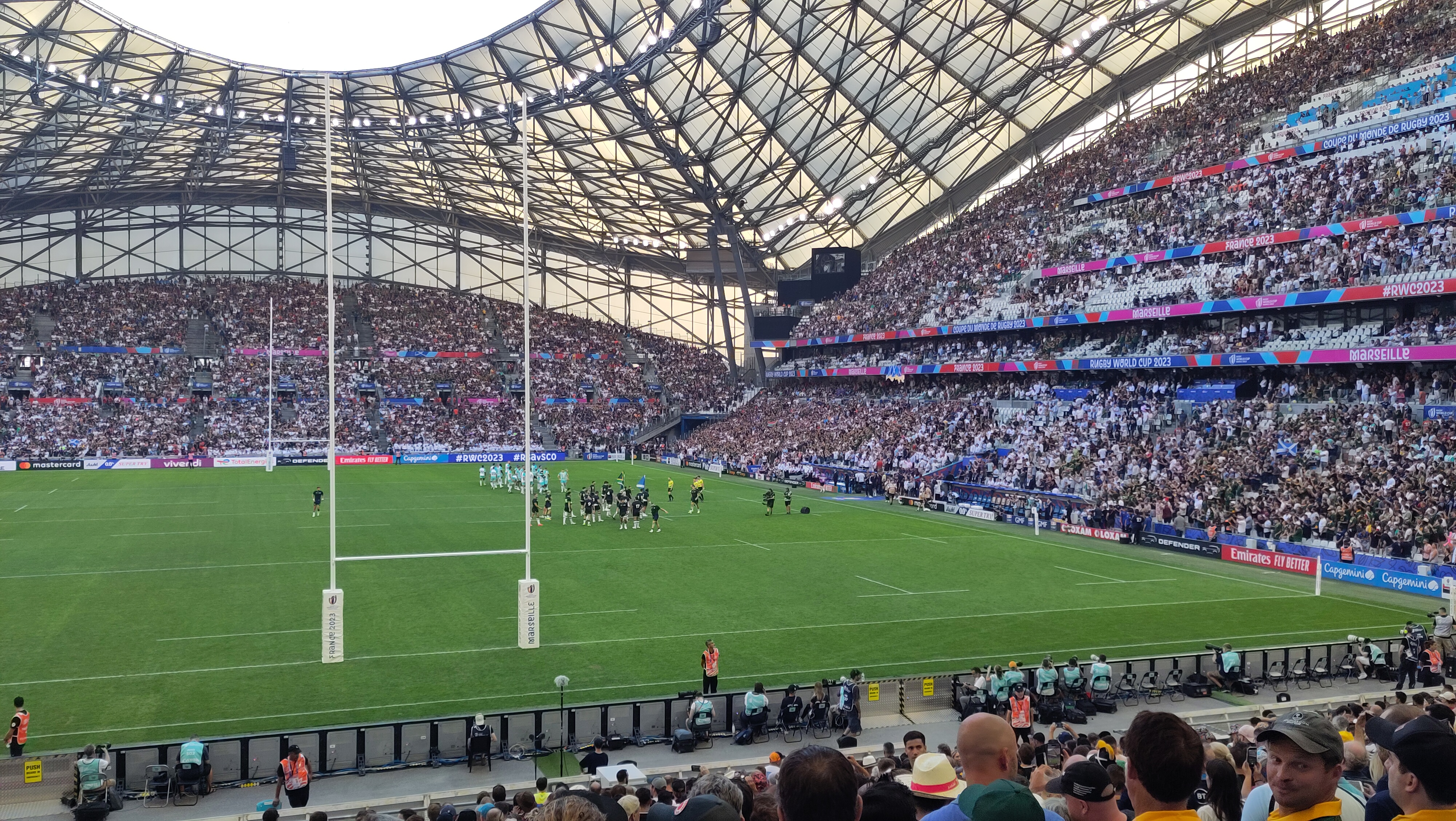
South Africa–Scotland at the Stade Vélodrome in Marseille, 10 September 2023

Team	City
Argentina	La Baule-Escoublac, Loire-Atlantique
Australia	Saint-Étienne, Loire
Chile	Perros-Guirec, Côtes-d'Armor
England	Le Touquet, Pas-de-Calais
Fiji	Lormont, Gironde
France	Rueil-Malmaison, Hauts-de-Seine
Georgia	Île de Ré – La Rochelle, Charente-Maritime
Ireland	Tours, Indre-et-Loire
Italy	Bourgoin-Jallieu, Isère
Japan	Toulouse, Haute-Garonne
Namibia	Aix-les-Bains, Savoie
New Zealand	Lyon, Rhône
Portugal	Perpignan, Pyrénées-Orientales
Romania	Libourne, Gironde
Samoa	Montpellier, Hérault
Scotland	Nice, Alpes-Maritimes
South Africa	Toulon, Var
Tonga	Croissy-sur-Seine, Yvelines
Uruguay	Avignon, Vaucluse
Wales	Versailles, Yvelines

== Teams ==
=== Qualification ===
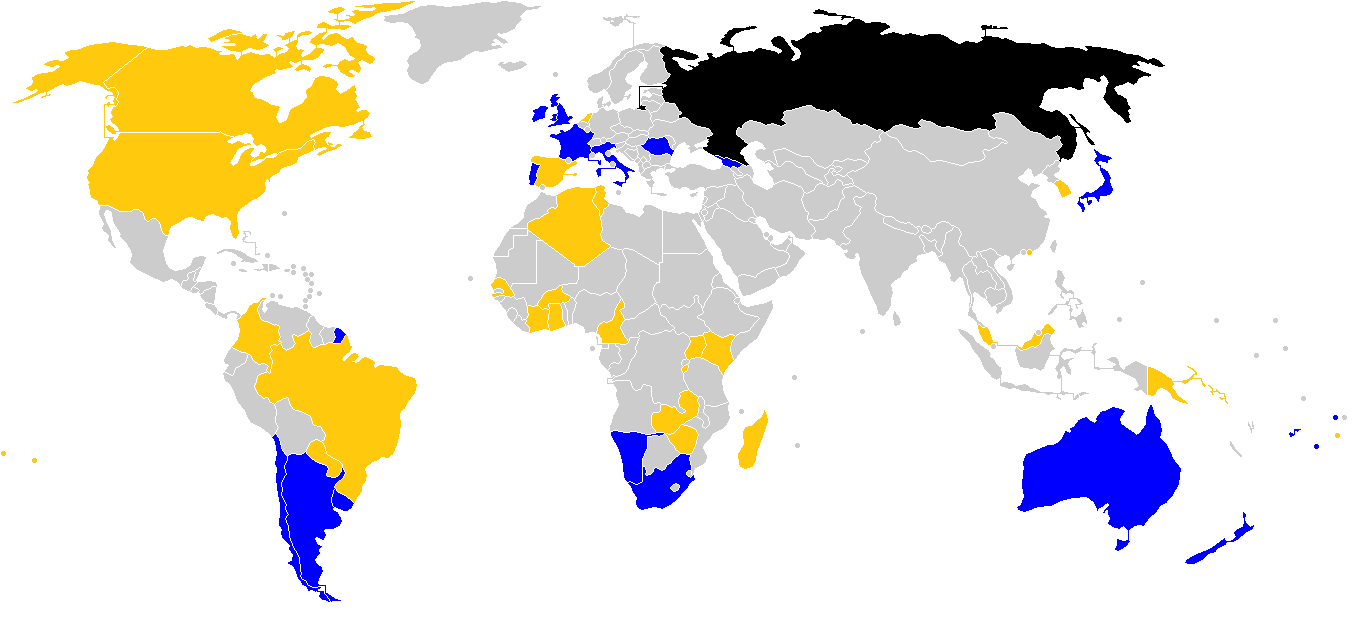
Qualification status: Qualified for the 2023 Rugby World Cup Failed to qualify Withdrew or suspended

Twenty teams competed. A total of 12 teams gained automatic qualification for the tournament after finishing in the top three of their pool at the 2019 Rugby World Cup, which included France already automatically qualified as host. The remaining eight spaces were decided by regional competitions followed by a few cross-regional play-offs.

Two berths were reserved to the European region. Spain originally qualified as Europe 2, but Romania lodged an official complaint that Spain had fielded an ineligible player during the qualifying tournament. After a controversial investigation, it was concluded that the player in question had falsified his passport: Spain received a deduction of 10 points, resulting in them being effectively ejected from the competition, with Romania replacing them as Europe 2 behind Georgia, unaffected as Europe 1. Portugal then took Romania's spot in the repechage tournament as Europe 3.

In Oceania and Asia, traditional middle powers emerged, with Samoa claiming the region's place at the World Cup (Fiji, New Zealand and Australia having automatically qualified). Tonga, the second Oceanian team, then won a playoff against Hong Kong, the highest ranked Asian representative, to claim their ninth appearance at a Rugby World Cup. Hong Kong proceeded to the final repechage tournament.

In Africa, Namibia reached their seventh Rugby World Cup as Africa 1, with Kenya moving forward to the final repechage.

The Americas were allocated two qualifying berths through a series of playoff matches spanning both regions. The 2023 Rugby World Cup witnessed historic developments in North and South American rugby. Canada's absence marked the first time in history that the country failed to qualify for the tournament. Similarly, the United States found themselves excluded from the competition for the first time since 1995, representing a notable departure from previous editions. The absence of North American representation significantly shifted the regional dynamic due to unified North and South American qualification matches.

On 18 November 2022, Portugal won the repechage tournament, overcoming Kenya, Hong Kong and the United States to be the last country to qualify for the 2023 Rugby World Cup.

Qualified teams
Region	Team	Qualification method	Previous apps	Previous best result	World Rank¹
Africa	South Africa	Top 3 in 2019 RWC pool	7	Champions (1995, 2007, 2019)	2
Africa	Namibia	Africa 1	6	Pool stage (six times)	21
Asia	Japan	Top 3 in 2019 RWC pool	9	Quarter-finals (2019)	14
Europe	France	Hosts	9	Runners-up (1987, 1999, 2011)	3
Europe	England	Top 3 in 2019 RWC pool	9	Champions (2003)	8
Europe	Ireland	Top 3 in 2019 RWC pool	9	Quarter-finals (seven times)	1
Europe	Italy	Top 3 in 2019 RWC pool	9	Pool stage (nine times)	13
Europe	Scotland	Top 3 in 2019 RWC pool	9	Fourth place (1991)	5
Europe	Wales	Top 3 in 2019 RWC pool	9	Third place (1987)	10
Europe	Georgia	Europe 1	5	Pool stage (five times)	11
Europe	Romania	Europe 2	8	Pool stage (eight times)	19
Europe	Portugal	Final Qualifier	1	Pool stage (2007)	16
Oceania	Australia	Top 3 in 2019 RWC pool	9	Champions (1991, 1999)	9
Oceania	Fiji	Top 3 in 2019 RWC pool	8	Quarter-finals (1987, 2007)	7
Oceania	New Zealand	Top 3 in 2019 RWC pool	9	Champions (1987, 2011, 2015)	4
Oceania	Samoa	Oceania 1	8	Quarter-finals (1991, 1995)	12
Oceania	Tonga	Play-off winner	8	Pool stage (eight times)	15
South America and North America Rugby	Argentina	Top 3 in 2019 RWC pool	9	Third place (2007)	6
South America and North America Rugby	Uruguay	Americas 1	4	Pool stage (1999, 2003, 2015, 2019)	17
South America and North America Rugby	Chile	Americas 2	0	Debut	22

¹as of 4 September 2023 post warm-up matches

=== Squads ===
Each team could submit a squad of 33 players for the tournament, an increase from 31 that was allowed in 2019. The squads were to be submitted to World Rugby by 1 September. If a team needed to call-up a new player, a player must first have been withdrawn from the active 33-player squad which is usually as a consequence of a long-term injury.

On 1 May, Wales were the first team to name their extended training squad for the tournament.

=== Draw ===
The pool draw took place on 14 December 2020 in Paris. The draw returned to its traditional place of the year following the previous World Cup, after the end-of-year internationals.

The seeding system from previous Rugby World Cups was retained with the 12 automatic qualifiers from 2019 being allocated to their respective bands based on their World Rugby Rankings on 1 January 2020:

- Band 1: The four highest-ranked teams
- Band 2: The next four highest-ranked teams
- Band 3: The final four directly qualified teams

The remaining two bands were made up of the eight qualifying teams, with allocation to each band being based on the previous Rugby World Cup playing strength:

- Band 4: – Oceania 1, Europe 1, Americas 1, Asia/Pacific 1
- Band 5: – Africa 1, Europe 2, Americas 2, Final Qualifier Winner

This meant the 20 teams, qualified and qualifiers, were seeded thus (world ranking as of 1 January 2020):

Band 1
- South Africa (1)
- New Zealand (2)
- England (3)
- Wales (4)
Band 2
- Ireland (5)
- Australia (6)
- France (7)
- Japan (8)
Band 3
- Scotland (9)
- Argentina (10)
- Fiji (11)
- Italy (12)
Band 4
- Samoa (Oceania 1)
- Georgia (Europe 1)
- Uruguay (Americas 1)
- Tonga (Asia/Pacific 1)
Band 5
- Namibia (Africa 1)
- Romania (Europe 2)
- Chile (Americas 2)
- Portugal (Final Qualifier Winner)

Having the draw so early (almost three years before the competition) was criticised. Changes in the World Rugby Rankings had taken place since, meaning that Pool B contained three of the top five teams (Ireland (1), South Africa (2) and Scotland (5)), while Pool A contained France (3) and New Zealand (4). Meanwhile, Pool C's highest-ranked team at the start of the tournament was Fiji (7). World Rugby CEO Alan Gilpin pledged that draws for future World Cups would be better balanced.

== Match officials ==
World Rugby named the following 12 referees, seven assistant referees and for the first time an expanded television match officials team of seven to handle the 48 matches.

Amongst the squad, Wayne Barnes officiated at a record fifth Rugby World Cup, while Nika Amashukeli became the first Georgian referee in the World Cup and first Tier 2 representative to referee a game since the game turned professional. Matthew Carley, Karl Dickson and Andrew Brace made their first appearance in a World Cup as a referee and Joy Neville became the first female named on match official panel for a men's Rugby World Cup.

Referees	Assistants	Television Match Officials
(Georgia (country)) Nika Amashukeli (Georgia)	Chris Busby (Ireland)	Brett Cronan (Australia)
Wayne Barnes (England)	Pierre Brousset (France)	Tom Foley (England)
Nic Berry (Australia)	James Doleman (New Zealand)	Marius Jonker (South Africa)
Andrew Brace (Ireland)	Craig Evans (Wales)	Brian MacNeice (Ireland)
Matthew Carley (England)	Andrea Piardi (Italy)	Joy Neville (Ireland)
Karl Dickson (England)	Christophe Ridley (England)	Brendon Pickerill (New Zealand)
Angus Gardner (Australia)	Jordan Way (Australia)	Ben Whitehouse (Wales)
Ben O'Keeffe (New Zealand)
Luke Pearce (England)
Jaco Peyper (South Africa)
Mathieu Raynal (France)
Paul Williams (New Zealand)

== Opening ceremony ==
The opening ceremony, directed and written by Jean Dujardin, Olivier Ferracci and Nora Matthey, took place on 8 September 2023 at the Stade de France in Saint-Denis, before the opening match between France and New Zealand.

== Pool stage ==
Competing countries were divided into four pools of five teams (pools A to D). Teams in each pool played one another in a round-robin, with the top two teams advancing to the knockout stage.

Pool A	Pool B	Pool C	Pool D
New Zealand; France; Italy; Uruguay; Namibia	South Africa; Ireland; Scotland; Tonga; Romania	Wales; Australia; Fiji; Georgia; Portugal	England; Japan; Argentina; Samoa; Chile

Points allocation in pool stage

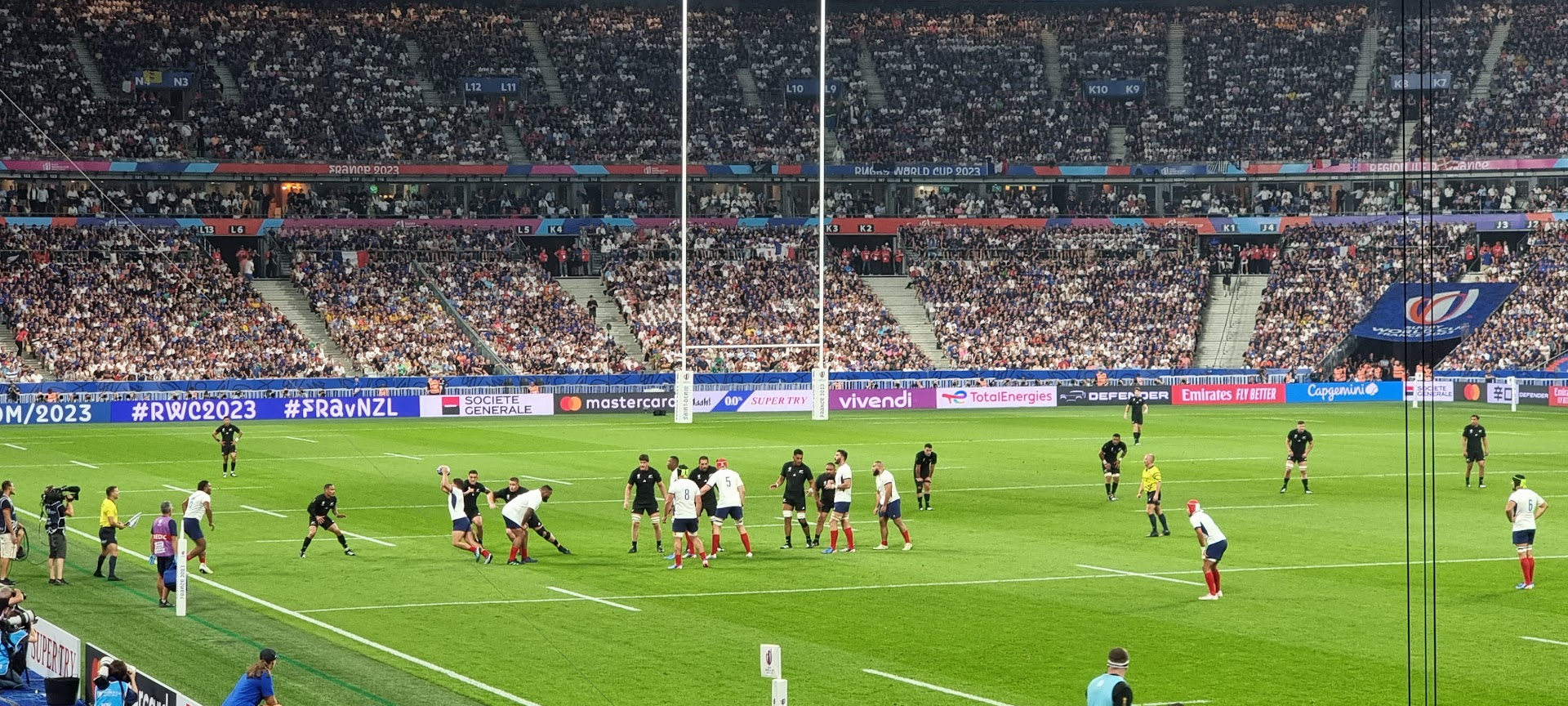
Opening game of the 2023 Rugby World Cup between France and New Zealand on 8 September.

- Four points are awarded for a win.
- Two points are awarded for a draw.
- A try bonus point is awarded to teams that score four or more tries in a match.
- A losing bonus point is awarded to teams that lose a match by fewer than eight points.

Tie-breaking criteria for pool play
The ranking of tied teams in the pool stage is determined as follows:
1. The winner of the Match in which the two tied Teams have played each other shall be the higher ranked.
2. The Team which has the best difference between points scored for and points scored against in all its pool Matches shall be the higher ranked.
3. The Team which has the best difference between tries scored for and tries scored against in all its pool Matches shall be the higher ranked.
4. The Team which has scored most points in all its pool Matches shall be the higher ranked.
5. The Team which has scored most tries in all its pool Matches shall be the higher ranked.
6. Should the tie be unresolved at the conclusion of steps 1 through 5, the rankings as per the updated Official World Rugby World Rankings on 2 October 2023 will determine the higher ranked Team. See the official World Rugby Rankings.

For clarification, in the case of a tie between three or more Teams at the end of the pool phase, once the highest ranked Team has been determined following the above criteria, to determine the next higher ranked Team the process would repeat, starting at the first criterion.

Key to colours in pool tables
Advanced to the quarter-finals and qualified for the 2027 Men's Rugby World Cup
Eliminated but qualified for 2027 Men's Rugby World Cup

=== Pool A ===
Pos	Team	Pld	W	D	L	PF	PA	PD	TF	TA	B	Pts	Qualification
1	France (H)	4	4	0	0	210	32	+178	27	5	2	18	Advance to knockout stage, and qualification to the 2027 Men's Rugby World Cup
2	New Zealand	4	3	0	1	253	47	+206	38	4	3	15	Advance to knockout stage, and qualification to the 2027 Men's Rugby World Cup
3	Italy	4	2	0	2	114	181	−67	15	25	2	10	Qualification to the 2027 Men's Rugby World Cup
4	Uruguay	4	1	0	3	65	164	−99	9	21	1	5	
5	Namibia	4	0	0	4	37	255	−218	3	37	0	0	

Source: World Rugby
Rules for classification: Pool stage tiebreakers
(H) Host

8 September 2023	France	27–13	New Zealand	Stade de France, Saint-Denis
9 September 2023	Italy	52–8	Namibia	Stade Geoffroy Guichard, Saint-Étienne
14 September 2023	France	27–12	Uruguay	Stade Pierre-Mauroy, Villeneuve-d'Ascq
15 September 2023	New Zealand	71–3	Namibia	Stadium de Toulouse, Toulouse
20 September 2023	Italy	38–17	Uruguay	Stade de Nice, Nice
21 September 2023	France	96–0	Namibia	Stade de Marseille, Marseille
27 September 2023	Uruguay	36–26	Namibia	Parc Olympique Lyonnais, Décines-Charpieu
29 September 2023	New Zealand	96–17	Italy	Parc Olympique Lyonnais, Décines-Charpieu
5 October 2023	New Zealand	73–0	Uruguay	Parc Olympique Lyonnais, Décines-Charpieu
6 October 2023	France	60–7	Italy	Parc Olympique Lyonnais, Décines-Charpieu

=== Pool B ===
Pos	Team	Pld	W	D	L	PF	PA	PD	TF	TA	B	Pts	Qualification
1	Ireland	4	4	0	0	190	46	+144	27	5	3	19	Advance to knockout stage, and qualification to the 2027 Men's Rugby World Cup
2	South Africa	4	3	0	1	151	34	+117	22	4	3	15	Advance to knockout stage, and qualification to the 2027 Men's Rugby World Cup
3	Scotland	4	2	0	2	146	71	+75	21	10	2	10	Qualification to the 2027 Men's Rugby World Cup
4	Tonga	4	1	0	3	96	177	−81	13	25	1	5	
5	Romania	4	0	0	4	32	287	−255	4	43	0	0	

Source: World Rugby
Rules for classification: Pool stage tiebreakers

9 September 2023	Ireland	82–8	Romania	Nouveau Stade de Bordeaux, Bordeaux
10 September 2023	South Africa	18–3	Scotland	Stade de Marseille, Marseille
16 September 2023	Ireland	59–16	Tonga	Stade de la Beaujoire, Nantes
17 September 2023	South Africa	76–0	Romania	Nouveau Stade de Bordeaux, Bordeaux
23 September 2023	South Africa	8–13	Ireland	Stade de France, Saint-Denis
24 September 2023	Scotland	45–17	Tonga	Stade de Nice, Nice
30 September 2023	Scotland	84–0	Romania	Stade Pierre-Mauroy, Villeneuve-d'Ascq
1 October 2023	South Africa	49–18	Tonga	Stade de Marseille, Marseille
7 October 2023	Ireland	36–14	Scotland	Stade de France, Saint-Denis
8 October 2023	Tonga	45–24	Romania	Stade Pierre-Mauroy, Villeneuve-d'Ascq

=== Pool C ===
Pos	Team	Pld	W	D	L	PF	PA	PD	TF	TA	B	Pts	Qualification
1	Wales	4	4	0	0	143	59	+84	17	8	3	19	Advance to knockout stage, and qualification to the 2027 Men's Rugby World Cup
2	Fiji	4	2	0	2	88	83	+5	9	9	3	11 (Note: Head-to-head: Australia 15–22 Fiji)	Advance to knockout stage, and qualification to the 2027 Men's Rugby World Cup
3	Australia	4	2	0	2	90	91	−1	11	8	3	11	Qualification to the 2027 Men's Rugby World Cup
4	Portugal	4	1	1	2	64	103	−39	8	13	0	6	
5	Georgia	4	0	1	3	64	113	−49	7	14	1	3	

Source: World Rugby
Rules for classification: Pool stage tiebreakers
Notes:

9 September 2023	Australia	35–15	Georgia	Stade de France, Saint-Denis
10 September 2023	Wales	32–26	Fiji	Nouveau Stade de Bordeaux, Bordeaux
16 September 2023	Wales	28–8	Portugal	Stade de Nice, Nice
17 September 2023	Australia	15–22	Fiji	Stade Geoffroy Guichard, Saint-Étienne
23 September 2023	Georgia	18–18	Portugal	Stadium de Toulouse, Toulouse
24 September 2023	Wales	40–6	Australia	Parc Olympique Lyonnais, Décines-Charpieu
30 September 2023	Fiji	17–12	Georgia	Nouveau Stade de Bordeaux, Bordeaux
1 October 2023	Australia	34–14	Portugal	Stade Geoffroy Guichard, Saint-Étienne
7 October 2023	Wales	43–19	Georgia	Stade de la Beaujoire, Nantes
8 October 2023	Fiji	23–24	Portugal	Stadium de Toulouse, Toulouse

=== Pool D ===
Pos	Team	Pld	W	D	L	PF	PA	PD	TF	TA	B	Pts	Qualification
1	England	4	4	0	0	150	39	+111	17	3	2	18	Advance to knockout stage, and qualification to the 2027 Men's Rugby World Cup
2	Argentina	4	3	0	1	127	69	+58	15	5	2	14	Advance to knockout stage, and qualification to the 2027 Men's Rugby World Cup
3	Japan	4	2	0	2	109	107	+2	12	14	1	9	Qualification to the 2027 Men's Rugby World Cup
4	Samoa	4	1	0	3	92	75	+17	11	7	3	7	
5	Chile	4	0	0	4	27	215	−188	4	30	0	0	

Source: World Rugby
Rules for classification: Pool stage tiebreakers

9 September 2023	England	27–10	Argentina	Stade de Marseille, Marseille
10 September 2023	Japan	42–12	Chile	Stadium de Toulouse, Toulouse
16 September 2023	Samoa	43–10	Chile	Nouveau Stade de Bordeaux, Bordeaux
17 September 2023	England	34–12	Japan	Stade de Nice, Nice
22 September 2023	Argentina	19–10	Samoa	Stade Geoffroy Guichard, Saint-Étienne
23 September 2023	England	71–0	Chile	Stade Pierre-Mauroy, Villeneuve-d'Ascq
28 September 2023	Japan	28–22	Samoa	Stadium de Toulouse, Toulouse
30 September 2023	Argentina	59–5	Chile	Stade de la Beaujoire, Nantes
7 October 2023	England	18–17	Samoa	Stade Pierre-Mauroy, Villeneuve-d'Ascq
8 October 2023	Japan	27–39	Argentina	Stade de la Beaujoire, Nantes

== Knockout stage ==
The knockout stage consisted of three single-elimination rounds culminating in a final and a third-place playoff. In the case of a tie in regulation time, two 10-minute periods of extra time would be played to determine a winner. If the scores were tied at the end of extra time, an additional 10-minute "sudden death" period would be played, with the first team to score any points being the winner. If the score still remained tied, a kicking competition would ensue.

=== Bracket ===
Quarter-finals
14 October – Marseille
Wales	17
Argentina	29
14 October – Saint-Denis
Ireland	24
New Zealand	28
15 October – Marseille
England	30
Fiji	24
15 October – Saint-Denis
France	28
South Africa	29

Semi-finals
20 October – Saint-Denis
Argentina	6
New Zealand	44
21 October – Saint-Denis
England	15
South Africa	16

Final
28 October – Saint-Denis
New Zealand	11
South Africa	12
Bronze final
27 October – Saint-Denis
Argentina	23
England	26

=== Quarter-finals ===
14 October 2023
17:00 CEST (UTC+2)

Wales	17–29	Argentina
Try: Biggar 14' c T. Williams 57' c Con: Biggar (2/2) 16', 58'; Pen: Biggar (1/2) 21'	Report	Try: Sclavi 68' c Sánchez 77' c Con: Boffelli (2/2) 69', 78'; Pen: Boffelli (4/5) 39', 45', 44', 48'; Sánchez (1/1) 80'

Stade de Marseille, Marseille
Attendance: 62,576
Referee: Karl Dickson (England)
(for Jaco Peyper (South Africa))

14 October 2023
21:00 CEST (UTC+2)

Ireland	24–28	New Zealand
Try: Aki 27' c Gibson-Park 39' c Penalty try 64'; Con: Sexton (2/2) 29', 40'; Pen: Sexton (1/2) 22'	Report	Try: Fainga'anuku 19' c Savea 33' m Jordan 53' c Con: Mo'unga (1/2) 21'; J. Barrett (1/1) 54'; Pen: Mo'unga (1/1) 8'; J. Barrett (2/3) 14', 69'

Stade de France, Saint-Denis
Attendance: 78,845
Referee: Wayne Barnes (England)

15 October 2023
17:00 CEST (UTC+2)

England	30–24	Fiji
Try: Tuilagi 14' m Marchant 23' c Con: Farrell (1/2) 23'; Pen: Farrell (5/6) 11', 34', 38', 54', 78'; Drop: Farrell (1/1) 72'	Report	Try: Mata 28' c Ravai 64' c Botitu 68' c Con: Lomani (1/1) 29'; Kuruvoli (2/2) 65', 70'; Pen: Lomani (1/3) 20'

Stade de Marseille, Marseille
Attendance: 61,863
Referee: Mathieu Raynal (France)

15 October 2023
21:00 CEST (UTC+2)

France	28–29	South Africa
Try: Baille (2) 4' c, 31' c Mauvaka 22' m Con: Ramos (2/3) 5', 32'; Pen: Ramos (3/4) 40+1', 54', 73'	Report	Try: Arendse 8' c De Allende 18' m Kolbe 27' c Etzebeth 67' c Con: Libbok (2/3) 10', 28'; Pollard (1/1) 67'; Pen: Pollard (1/1) 69'

Stade de France, Saint-Denis
Attendance: 79,486
Referee: Ben O'Keeffe (New Zealand)

=== Semi-finals ===
20 October 2023
21:00 CEST (UTC+2)

Argentina	6–44	New Zealand
Pen: Boffelli (2/2) 5', 35'	Report	Try: Jordan (3) 11' c, 62' m, 73' m J. Barrett 17' m Frizell (2) 40+2' m, 49' c Smith 42' c Con: Mo'unga (3/7) 12', 43', 50'; Pen: Mo'unga (1/1) 38'

Stade de France, Saint-Denis
Attendance: 77,653
Referee: Angus Gardner (Australia)

21 October 2023
21:00 CEST (UTC+2)

England	15–16	South Africa
Pen: Farrell (4/4) 3', 10', 24', 39'; Drop: Farrell (1/1) 53'	Report	Try: Snyman 69' c Con: Pollard (1/1) 70'; Pen: Libbok (1/1) 21'; Pollard (2/2) 35', 78'

Stade de France, Saint-Denis
Attendance: 78,098
Referee: Ben O'Keeffe (New Zealand)

=== Bronze final ===
27 October 2023
21:00 CEST (UTC+2)

Argentina	23–26	England
Try: Cubelli 36' c S. Carreras 42' c Con: Boffelli (2/2) 37', 43'; Pen: Boffelli (2/2) 24', 50'; Sánchez (1/2) 68'	Report	Try: Earl 8' c Dan 44' c Con: Farrell (2/2) 9', 45'; Pen: Farrell (4/4) 3', 13', 30', 65'

Stade de France, Saint-Denis
Attendance: 77,674
Referee: Nic Berry (Australia)

=== Final ===
28 October 2023
21:00 CEST (UTC+2)

New Zealand	11–12	South Africa
Try: B. Barrett 58' m Pen: Mo'unga (2/2) 17', 38'	Report	Pen: Pollard (4/4) 3', 13', 19', 34'

Stade de France, Saint-Denis
Attendance: 80,065
Referee: Wayne Barnes (England)

== Statistics ==
=== Most tries ===
8 tries

- (New Zealand) Will Jordan

6 tries

- (France) Damian Penaud

5 tries

- (England) Henry Arundell
- (Ireland) Bundee Aki
- (New Zealand) Leicester Fainga'anuku
- (New Zealand) Damian McKenzie
- (Scotland) Darcy Graham
- (Wales) Louis Rees-Zammit

=== Most points ===
Top 10 points scorers
Player	Team	Total	Details						
Player	Team	Total				Tries	Conversions	Penalties	Drop goals
Owen Farrell	England	75	0	12	15	2			
Thomas Ramos	France	74	1	21	9	0			
Emiliano Boffelli	Argentina	67	2	9	13	0			
Johnny Sexton	Ireland	58	3	17	3	0			
Richie Mo'unga	New Zealand	56	1	18	5	0			
Damian McKenzie	New Zealand	53	5	14	0	0			
Rikiya Matsuda	Japan	46	0	11	8	0			
Ben Donaldson	Australia	45	2	7	7	0			
George Ford	England	41	0	4	8	3			
Will Jordan	New Zealand	40	8	0	0	0			

== Broadcasting rights ==
Territory	Rights holder	Ref.
Argentina	Star+, ESPN, TVP (Note: All Argentina matches plus opening match, both semi-finals and the final)	
Australia	Stan Sport (Note: All matches)	
Australia	Nine Network (Note: All Australia matches plus final)	
Austria	ProSieben	
Belgium	Play Sports	
Bosnia and Herzegovina	Sport Klub	
Brazil	ESPN	
Bulgaria	BNT	
Canada	TSN	
Caribbean	ESPN	
Chile	Mega (Note: All Chile matches plus opening match, both semi-finals and the final)	
Cook Islands	Cook Islands Television	
Croatia	Sport Klub	
Czech Republic	Czech Television	
Denmark	Viaplay	
Estonia	Go3 Sport	
Fiji	Fiji Television	
Finland	Viaplay	
France	TF1 (Note: 20 matches including all France games except France v Namibia)	
France	France Télévisions (Note: 10 matches including France v Namibia)	
France	M6 (Note: 18 matches)	
Georgia	GPB	
Germany	ProSieben MAXX (Note: 35 matches)	
Germany	ran.de and Joyn	
Iceland	Viaplay	
India	FanCode	
Indian subcontinent	Sony Sports Network	
Ireland	RTÉ (Note: 25 matches including Ireland v Tonga and Ireland v South Africa.)	
Ireland	Virgin Media (Note: 24 matches including Ireland v Romania, Ireland v Scotland and Ireland v New Zealand.)	
Israel	Sport1	
Italy; San Marino	RAI (Note: All Italy matches and most important games)	
Italy; San Marino	Sky Sport	
Japan	J Sports	
Japan	Nippon TV (Note: 19 matches including 3 Japan pool matches)	
Japan	NHK (Note: 15 matches including 2 Japan pool matches)	
Latin America	ESPN (Note: Select matches plus opening match, both semi-finals and the final)	
Latin America	Star+	
Latvia	Go3 Sport	
Liechtenstein	SRG SSR	
Lithuania	Go3 Sport	
Malta	PBS	
Middle East and North Africa	Starz	
Montenegro	Sport Klub	
Namibia	NBC	
Netherlands	Ziggo Sport	
New Zealand	Sky Sport	
New Zealand	Sky Open (Note: 6 matches: one All Blacks pool match, two quarter-finals, one semi-final and both finals)	
New Zealand	Stuff (Note: 12 matches including France v New Zealand, one semi-final and the final)	
North Macedonia	Sport Klub	
Norway	Viaplay	
Papua New Guinea	EM TV	
Poland	Polsat Sport	
Portugal	RTP (Note: All Portugal matches)	
Portugal	Sport TV	
Romania	Digi Sport	
Romania	Orange Sport	
Samoa	SBC	
Serbia	Sport Klub	
Slovenia	Sport Klub	
Solomon Islands	TTV	
South Africa	SuperSport	
South Korea	Coupang Play	
Southeast Asia	beIN Sports	
Spain; Andorra	Movistar Plus+	
Sri Lanka	MTV	
Sub-Saharan Africa	SuperSport	
Sub-Saharan Africa	New World TV	
Sweden	Viaplay	
Switzerland	SRG SSR	
Tonga	TBC	
Turkey	S Sport	
United Kingdom	ITV/STV	
United Kingdom	S4C	
United States	NBC Sports	
Uruguay	Canal 10	
Uruguay	Teledoce	
Vanuatu	VBTC	

== Marketing ==
=== Sponsorship ===
Worldwide partners	Official sponsors	Official suppliers	Official supporters
Asahi; Capgemini; Defender; Emirates; Mastercard; Société Générale	GL events; GMF; Loxam; Orange; Proman; SNCF; TotalEnergies; Vivendi	Andros; BKT; Canon; Eden Park; EF Education First; Geodis; Gilbert; HP; InVivo; Lipovitan D; Macron; Meta; Mitsubishi Electric; Tudor	Accor Live Limitless; Aramis Rugby; Casino; France Pare-Brise; Koesio; PPA Business School; RATP Group; Sage; Volvic

== See also ==
- History of the Rugby World Cup
