= Russia at the Rugby World Cup =

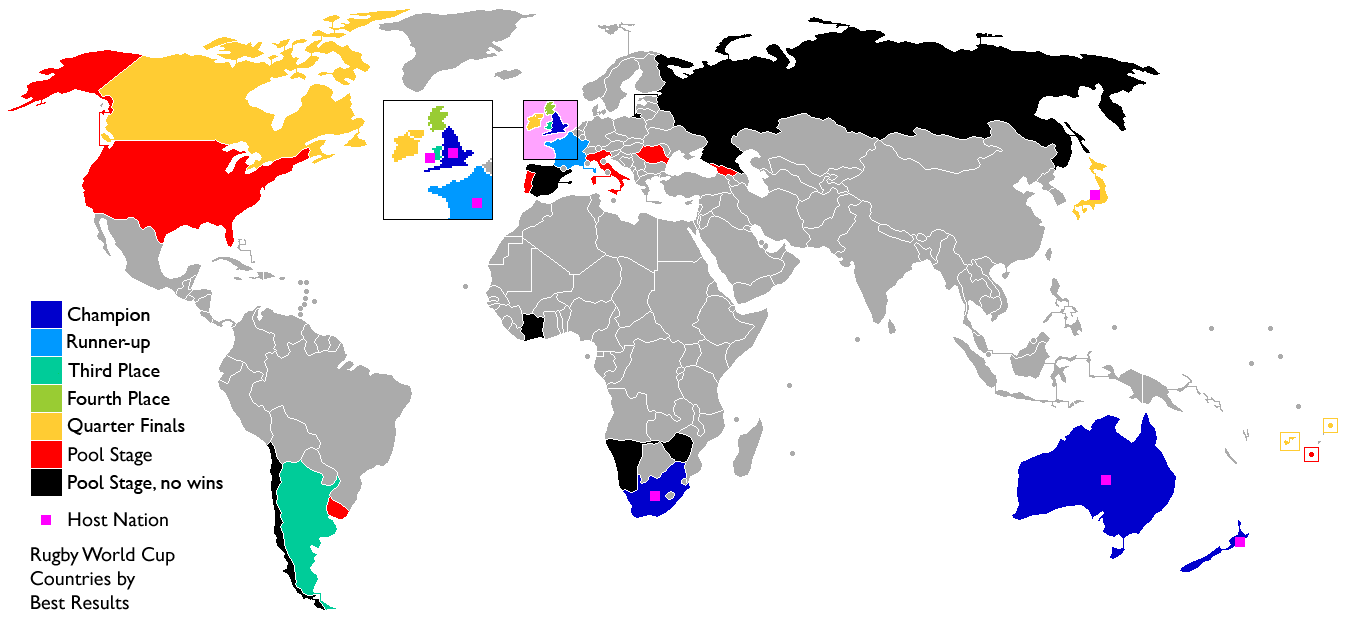
Map of nations best results, excluding nations which unsuccessfully participated in qualifying tournaments.

Russia qualified for the Rugby World Cup for the first time in 2011.

As of April 26, 2010, Russia placed at 19th position in the world rankings, just behind Romania and the USA. They are currently the ninth best team in Europe according to the world rankings.

Nation	Number of appearances	First appearance	Most recent appearance	Streak	Best result
Russia	2	2011	2019	1	Pool stages

Rugby World Cup record										Qualification						
Year	Round	Pld	W	D	L	PF	PA	Squad	Head coach	Pos	Pld	W	D	L	PF	PA
(New Zealand) (Australia) 1987	Declined invitation									–						
(England) (France) (Ireland) (Scotland) (Wales) 1991	Did not enter									–						
(South Africa) 1995	Did not qualify									2nd	4	3	0	1	125	49
(Wales) 1999	Did not qualify									P/O	4	1	0	3	85	92
(Australia) 2003	Expelled from competing at tournament after qualification									P/O	6	5	0	1	176	114
(France) 2007	Did not qualify									3rd	14	6	1	7	382	323
(New Zealand) 2011	Pool stage	4	0	0	4	57	196	Squad	N. Nerush	2nd	10	7	1	2	291	175
(England) 2015	Did not qualify									P/O	12	7	0	5	269	300
(Japan) 2019	Pool stage	4	0	0	4	19	160	Squad	L. Jones	1st	8	4	0	4	19	160
(France) 2023	Disqualified									–						
(Australia) 2027	Disqualified									–						
(United States) 2031	To be determined									To be determined						
Total	—	8	0	0	8	76	356	—	—	—	58	33	2	23	1554	1197
Champions; Runners–up; Third place; Fourth place; Home venue

== By position ==
Year	Round	Position	Played	Won	Drew	Lost	For	Against
(Australia) (New Zealand) 1987	-	–	-	-	–	-	-	-
(United Kingdom) (Republic of Ireland) (France) 1991	-	–	-	–	–	-	-	-
(South Africa) 1995	–	–	–	–	–	–	–	–
(Wales) 1999	–	–	–	–	–	–	–	–
(Australia) 2003	–	–	–	–	–	–	–	–
(France) 2007	–	–	–	–	–	–	–	–
(New Zealand) 2011	Group	18th	4	0	0	4	57	196
(England) 2015	–	–	–	–	–	–	–	–
(Japan) 2019	Group	20th	4	0	0	4	19	160
Total	-	–	8	0	0	8	76	356

== By match ==
=== 2011 Rugby World Cup ===
==== Pool C ====
Pos	Team	Pld	W	D	L	PF	PA	PD	T	B	Pts	Qualification
1	Ireland	4	4	0	0	135	34	+101	15	1	17	Advanced to the quarter-finals and qualified for the 2015 Rugby World Cup
2	Australia	4	3	0	1	173	48	+125	25	3	15	Advanced to the quarter-finals and qualified for the 2015 Rugby World Cup
3	Italy	4	2	0	2	92	95	−3	13	2	10	Eliminated but qualified for 2015 Rugby World Cup
4	United States	4	1	0	3	38	122	−84	4	0	4	
5	Russia	4	0	0	4	57	196	−139	8	1	1	

15 September 2011
19:30

Russia	6–13	United States
Pen: Kushnarev (1/4) 3'; Rachkov (1/1) 78'	Report	Try: Petri 19' c Con: Wyles (1/1); Pen: Wyles (2/5) 12', 65'; Drop: Wyles (0/1)

Stadium Taranaki, New Plymouth
Attendance: 13,931
Referee: Dave Pearson (England)

20 September 2011
19:30

Italy	53–17	Russia
Try: Parisse 6' c Toniolatti (2) 13' m, 23' c Benvenuti (2) 16' m, 48' m Penalty try 29' c Gori 37' c McLean 64' m Zanni 77' m Con: Bocchino (4/6); Benvenuti (0/3); Pen: Bocchino (0/1)	Report	Try: Yanyushkin 34' c Ostroushko 50' m Makovetskiy 71' m Con: Rachkov (1/3)

Trafalgar Park, Nelson
Attendance: 12,418
Referee: Wayne Barnes (England)

25 September 2011
18:00

Ireland	62–12	Russia
Try: McFadden 10' c O'Brien 13' c Boss 38' c Earls (2) 38' c, 48' c Trimble 40+' m Kearney 65' c Jennings 73' c Buckley 79' m Con: O'Gara (6/7); Sexton (1/2); Pen: O'Gara (1/1) 6'	Report	Try: Artemyev 50' c Simplikevich 59' m Con: Rachkov (1/2)

Rotorua International Stadium, Rotorua
Attendance: 25,661
Referee: Craig Joubert (South Africa)

1 October 2011
15:30

Australia	68–22	Russia
Try: Barnes (2) 7' m, 79' c Mitchell (2) 9' c, 49' c McCalman 12' c Pocock (2) 15' c, 22' c Moore 36' c Ashley-Cooper 39' c Ma'afu 42' c Con: O'Connor (9/10)	Report	Try: Ostroushko 33' m Simplikevich 60' c Rachkov 68' c Con: Kushnarev (0/1); Rachkov (2/2); Drop: Rachkov (1/1) 47'

Trafalgar Park, Nelson
Attendance: 16,307
Referee: Bryce Lawrence (New Zealand)

=== 2019 Rugby World Cup ===
==== Pool A ====
Pos	Team	Pld	W	D	L	PF	PA	PD	T	B	Pts	Qualification
1	Japan	4	4	0	0	115	62	+53	13	3	19	Advanced to the quarter-finals and qualified for the 2023 Rugby World Cup
2	Ireland	4	3	0	1	121	27	+94	18	4	16	Advanced to the quarter-finals and qualified for the 2023 Rugby World Cup
3	Scotland	4	2	0	2	119	55	+64	16	3	11	Eliminated but qualified for 2023 Rugby World Cup
4	Samoa	4	1	0	3	58	128	−70	8	1	5	
5	Russia	4	0	0	4	19	160	−141	1	0	0	

===== Japan vs Russia =====
20 September 2019
19:45 JST (UTC+09)

(1 BP) Japan	30–10	Russia
Try: Matsushima (3) 12' m, 39' c, 69' c Labuschagné 47' m Con: Tamura (1/3) 40'; Matsuda (1/1) 71'; Pen: Tamura (2/2) 44', 64'	Report	Try: Golosnitski 5' c Con: Kushnarev (1/1) 6'; Pen: Kushnarev (1/1) 61'

Tokyo Stadium, Chōfu
Attendance: 45,745
Referee: Nigel Owens (Wales)

Japan	Russia

FB	15	Will Tupou	(substituted off) 71'
RW	14	Kotaro Matsushima
OC	13	Timothy Lafaele
IC	12	Ryoto Nakamura
LW	11	Lomano Lemeki
FH	10	Yu Tamura	(substituted off) 67'
SH	9	Yutaka Nagare	(substituted off) 61'
N8	8	Kazuki Himeno
OF	7	Lappies Labuschagné
BF	6	Michael Leitch (c)	(substituted off) 71'
RL	5	James Moore
LL	4	Wimpie van der Walt	(substituted off) 61'
TP	3	Asaeli Ai Valu	(substituted off) 55'
HK	2	Shota Horie	(substituted off) 75'
LP	1	Keita Inagaki	(substituted off) 55'
Replacements:
HK	16	Atsushi Sakate	(substituted in) 75'
PR	17	Isileli Nakajima	(substituted in) 55'
PR	18	Koo Ji-won	(substituted in) 55'
LK	19	Luke Thompson	(substituted in) 60'
FL	20	Hendrik Tui	(substituted in) 71'
SH	21	Fumiaki Tanaka	(substituted in) 61'
FH	22	Rikiya Matsuda	(substituted in) 67'
FB	23	Ryohei Yamanaka	(substituted in) 71'
Coach:
(New Zealand) Jamie Joseph

FB	15	Vasily Artemyev (c)
RW	14	German Davydov
OC	13	Vladimir Ostroushko
IC	12	Dmitry Gerasimov	(substituted off) 68'
LW	11	Kirill Golosnitsky
FH	10	Yuri Kushnarev	(substituted off) 65'
SH	9	Vasily Dorofeev	(substituted off) 33'	(substituted in) 42'	(substituted off) 74'
N8	8	Nikita Vavilin
OF	7	Tagir Gadzhiev
BF	6	Vitaly Zhivatov	(substituted off) 65'
RL	5	Bogdan Fedotko	(substituted off) 61'
LL	4	Andrei Ostrikov
TP	3	Kirill Gotovtsev	(substituted off) 68'
HK	2	Stanislav Sel'skiy	(substituted off) 65'
LP	1	Valery Morozov	(substituted off) 65'
Replacements:
HK	16	Evgeny Matveev	(substituted in) 65'
PR	17	Andrei Polivalov	(substituted in) 65'
PR	18	Azamat Bitiev	(substituted in) 68'
LK	19	Andrey Garbuzov	(substituted in) 62'
FL	20	Anton Sychev	(substituted in) 65'
SH	21	Dmitry Perov	(substituted in) 33'	(substituted off) 42'	(substituted in) 74'
FH	22	Ramil Gaisin	(substituted in) 65'
WG	23	Vladislav Sozonov	(substituted in) 68'
Coach:
(Wales) Lyn Jones

Player of the Match:
Kotaro Matsushima (Japan)

Assistant referees:
Nic Berry (Australia)
Matthew Carley (England)
Television match official:
Ben Skeen (New Zealand)

Notes:

- This was the first Rugby World Cup opener not to feature a Tier 1 nation.
- Kotaro Matsushima (Japan) became the first Japanese player to score a hat-trick at a World Cup, and the first player to score one in a Rugby World Cup opener.
- Russia's try was the fastest to be scored in an opening match of a Rugby World Cup.

===== Russia vs Samoa =====
24 September 2019
19:15 JST (UTC+09)

Russia	9–34	Samoa (1 BP)
Pen: Kushnarev (2/2) 19', 26'; Drop: Kushnarev (1/1) 48'	Report	Try: Leiua (2) 16' m, 80' m Amosa 45' m Fidow (2) 49' c, 53' c Lee-Lo 63' m Con: Pisi (2/5) 50', 54'

Kumagaya Rugby Stadium, Kumagaya
Attendance: 22,564
Referee: Romain Poite (France)

Russia	Samoa

FB	15	Vasily Artemyev (c)
RW	14	German Davydov
OC	13	Vladimir Ostroushko
IC	12	Dmitry Gerasimov		(substituted off) 65'
LW	11	Kirill Golosnitsky
FH	10	Yuri Kushnarev		(substituted off) 55'
SH	9	Vasily Dorofeev		(substituted off) 55'
N8	8	Nikita Vavilin		(substituted off) 65'
OF	7	Tagir Gadzhiev
BF	6	Vitaly Zhivatov
RL	5	Bogdan Fedotko
LL	4	Andrei Ostrikov		(substituted off) 65'
TP	3	Kirill Gotovtsev	(yellow card) 47'	(substituted off) 71'
HK	2	Stanislav Sel'skiy		(substituted off) 57'
LP	1	Valery Morozov		(substituted off) 59'
Replacements:
HK	16	Evgeny Matveev		(substituted in) 57'
PR	17	Andrey Polivalov		(substituted in) 59'
PR	18	Azamat Bitiev		(substituted in) 71'
LK	19	Andrey Garbuzov		(substituted in) 65'
FL	20	Anton Sychev		(substituted in) 21'
SH	21	Dmitry Perov		(substituted in) 22'
FH	22	Ramil Gaisin		(substituted in) 55'
WG	23	Vladislav Sozonov		(substituted in) 65'
Coach:
(Wales) Lyn Jones

FB	15	Tim Nanai-Williams		(substituted off) 65'
RW	14	Alapati Leiua
OC	13	Rey Lee-Lo	(yellow card) 29'
IC	12	Henry Taefu
LW	11	Ed Fidow
FH	10	Tusi Pisi		(substituted off) 65'
SH	9	Dwayne Polataivao		(substituted off) 40'
N8	8	Afa Amosa		(substituted off) 33'	(substituted in) 40'	(substituted off) 46'
OF	7	TJ Ioane
BF	6	Chris Vui (c)
RL	5	Kane Le'aupepe
LL	4	Filo Paulo		(substituted off) 65'
TP	3	Michael Alaalatoa		(substituted off) 55'
HK	2	Motu Matu'u	(yellow card) 31'		(substituted off) 40'
LP	1	Logovi'i Mulipola		(substituted off) 51'
Replacements:
HK	16	Ray Niuia		(substituted in) 33'
PR	17	Paul Alo-Emile		(substituted in) 55'
PR	18	Jordan Lay		(substituted in) 51'
LK	19	Senio Toleafoa		(substituted in) 65'
LK	20	Josh Tyrell				(substituted in) 46'
SH	21	Melani Matavao		(substituted in) 40'
FH	22	AJ Alatimu		(substituted in) 65'
FH	23	UJ Seuteni		(substituted in) 65'
Coach:
(New Zealand) Steve Jackson

Player of the Match:
Alapati Leiua (Samoa)

Assistant referees:
Jérôme Garcès (France)
Brendon Pickerill (New Zealand)
Television match official:
Graham Hughes (England)

Notes:

- This was the first meeting between the two nations.
- Ahsee Tuala was due to start the game, but was replaced with Henry Taefu following injury ahead of kick off.

===== Ireland vs Russia =====
3 October 2019
19:15 JST (UTC+09)

(1 BP) Ireland	35–0	Russia
Try: Kearney 2' c O'Mahony 13' c Ruddock 35' c Conway 62' c Ringrose 76' c Con: Sexton (3/3) 4', 15', 37'; Carty (2/2) 63', 77'	Report

Kobe Misaki Stadium, Kobe
Attendance: 26,856
Referee: Jérôme Garcès (France)

Ireland	Russia

FB	15	Rob Kearney	(substituted off) 50'
RW	14	Andrew Conway
OC	13	Garry Ringrose
IC	12	Bundee Aki
LW	11	Keith Earls
FH	10	Johnny Sexton (c)	(substituted off) 40'
SH	9	Luke McGrath
N8	8	Jordi Murphy	(substituted off) 27'
OF	7	Peter O'Mahony
BF	6	Rhys Ruddock
RL	5	Jean Kleyn	(substituted off) 61'
LL	4	Tadhg Beirne
TP	3	John Ryan	(substituted off) 58'
HK	2	Niall Scannell	(substituted off) 58'
LP	1	Dave Kilcoyne	(substituted off) 58'
Replacements:
HK	16	Seán Cronin	(substituted in) 58'
PR	17	Andrew Porter	(substituted in) 58'
PR	18	Tadhg Furlong	(substituted in) 58'
LK	19	Iain Henderson	(substituted in) 61'
N8	20	CJ Stander	(substituted in) 27'
SH	21	Conor Murray
FH	22	Jack Carty	(substituted in) 40'
FB	23	Jordan Larmour	(substituted in) 50'
Coach:
(New Zealand) Joe Schmidt

FB	15	Vasily Artemyev (c)
RW	14	German Davydov
OC	13	Igor Galinovskiy
IC	12	Kirill Golosnitsky		(substituted off) 15'
LW	11	Denis Simplikevich		(substituted off) 71'
FH	10	Ramil Gaisin
SH	9	Dmitry Perov
N8	8	Victor Gresev
OF	7	Tagir Gadzhiev
BF	6	Anton Sychev		(substituted off) 70'
RL	5	Bogdan Fedotko	(yellow card) 34'	(substituted off) 64'
LL	4	Andrey Garbuzov		(substituted off) 50'
TP	3	Kirill Gotovtsev		(substituted off) 68'
HK	2	Evgeny Matveev		(substituted off) 40'
LP	1	Andrey Polivalov		(substituted off) 40'
Replacements:
HK	16	Stanislav Sel'skiy		(substituted in) 40'
PR	17	Valery Morozov		(substituted in) 40'
PR	18	Vladimir Podrezov		(substituted in) 68'
LK	19	Andrei Ostrikov	(yellow card) 51'	(substituted in) 50'
LK	20	Evgeny Elgin		(substituted in) 64'
FH	21	Sergey Yanyushkin		(substituted in) 71'
FL	22	Roman Khodin		(substituted in) 70'
CE	23	Vladimir Ostroushko		(substituted in) 15'
Coach:
(Wales) Lyn Jones

Player of the Match:
Rhys Ruddock (Ireland)

Assistant referees:
Mathieu Raynal (France)
Brendon Pickerill (New Zealand)
Television match official:
Ben Skeen (New Zealand)

Notes:

- Igor Galinovskiy (Russia) earned his 50th test cap.

===== Scotland vs Russia =====
9 October 2019
16:15 JST (UTC+09)

(1 BP) Scotland	61–0	Russia
Try: Hastings (2) 14' c, 18' c G. Horne (3) 22' c, 45' c, 59' m Turner 51' c Seymour 56' c Barclay 75' c McInally 78' c Con: Hastings (8/9) 15', 20', 24', 46', 53', 57', 76', 80'	Report

Shizuoka Stadium Ecopa, Fukuroi
Attendance: 44,123
Referee: Wayne Barnes (England)

Scotland	Russia

FB	15	Blair Kinghorn
RW	14	Tommy Seymour
OC	13	Duncan Taylor
IC	12	Peter Horne
LW	11	Darcy Graham	(substituted off) 47'
FH	10	Adam Hastings
SH	9	George Horne	(substituted off) 65'
N8	8	Ryan Wilson
OF	7	Fraser Brown	(substituted off) 31'
BF	6	John Barclay (c)
RL	5	Ben Toolis
LL	4	Scott Cummings	(substituted off) 61'
TP	3	Zander Fagerson	(substituted off) 40'
HK	2	George Turner	(substituted off) 65'
LP	1	Gordon Reid	(substituted off) 61'
Replacements:
HK	16	Stuart McInally	(substituted in) 65'
PR	17	Simon Berghan	(substituted in) 40'
PR	18	W. P. Nel	(substituted in) 61'
LK	19	Grant Gilchrist	(substituted in) 61'
FL	20	Magnus Bradbury	(substituted in) 31'
FL	21	Jamie Ritchie
SH	22	Henry Pyrgos	(substituted in) 47'
CE	23	Chris Harris	(substituted in) 65'
Coach:
(Scotland) Gregor Townsend

FB	15	Vasily Artemyev (c)			(substituted off) 61'
RW	14	German Davydov
OC	13	Vladimir Ostroushko	(substituted off) 38'	(substituted in) 40'
IC	12	Dmitry Gerasimov
LW	11	Vladislav Sozonov
FH	10	Ramil Gaisin	(substituted off) 65'
SH	9	Dmitry Perov
N8	8	Nikita Vavilin	(substituted off) 58'
OF	7	Tagir Gadzhiev
BF	6	Vitaly Zhivatov
RL	5	Evgeny Elgin	(substituted off) 50'
LL	4	Andrei Ostrikov	(substituted off) 69'
TP	3	Kirill Gotovtsev	(substituted off) 61'
HK	2	Stanislav Sel'skiy	(substituted off) 61'
LP	1	Valery Morozov	(substituted off) 61'
Replacements:
HK	16	Sergey Chernyshev	(substituted in) 61'
PR	17	Azamat Bitiev	(substituted in) 61'
PR	18	Vladimir Podrezov	(substituted in) 61'
LK	19	Bogdan Fedotko	(substituted in) 50'
LK	20	Andrey Garbuzov	(substituted in) 69'
FH	21	Sergey Yanyushkin	(substituted in) 65'
N8	22	Anton Sychev	(substituted in) 58'
FH	23	Yuri Kushnarev	(substituted in) 38'	(substituted off) 40'	(substituted in) 61'
Coach:
(Wales) Lyn Jones

Player of the Match:
Adam Hastings (Scotland)

Assistant referees:
Alexandre Ruiz (France)
Federico Anselmi (Argentina)
Television match official:
Marius Jonker (South Africa)

Notes:

- This is the first meeting between the two nations.
- Vladimir Ostroushko (Russia) earned his 50th test cap.
- Scotland became the first team to record multiple nilled-victories over their opponent in one World Cup campaign, and become the first team to record a fifth nilled-victory in World Cup history.
- Mathieu Raynal was due to referee this game but withdrew ahead of kick off due to illness - Wayne Barnes stepped up from assistant with Alexandre Ruiz covering the assistant role.

== World Cup Records ==
Australia vs	Played	Win	Draw	Lost	Win %
Australia	1	0	0	1	0%
Ireland	2	0	0	2	0%
Japan	1	0	0	1	0%
Italy	1	0	0	1	0%
Samoa	1	0	0	1	0%
Scotland	1	0	0	1	0%
United States	1	0	0	1	0%
Overall	8	0	0	8	0%

== Team Records ==
Most points in a tournament

- 57 In New Zealand(2011)
- 19 in Japan(2019)

Highest Score

- 22 vs Australia 2011
- 17 vs Italy 2011
- 12 vs Ireland 2011
- 10 vs Japan 2019
- 9 Vs Samoa 2019

Highest Winning Margin

Nil

Highest Score Against

- 68 vs Australia 2011
- 62 vs Ireland 2011
- 61 vs Scotland 2019
- 53 vs Italy 2011
- 35 vs Ireland 2019

Biggest Losing Margin

- 61 vs Scotland 2019
- 50 vs Ireland 2011
- 46 vs Australia 2011
- 35 vs Ireland 2019
- 25 vs Samoa 2019

Most Tries in a Game

- 3 vs Australia 2011
- 3 vs Italy 2011
- 2 vs Ireland 2011
- 1 vs Japan 2019

Most Penalty Goals in a Game

- 2 vs United States 2011
- 2 vs Samoa 2019
- 1 vs Japan 2019

Most Drop Goals in a Game

- 1 vs Australia 2011
- 1 vs Samoa 2019

== Individual Records ==
Most Appearances

- 8 Vladimir Ostroushko(2011,2019)
- 8 Andrey Garbuzov (2011,2019)
- 8 Vasily Artemyev (2011,2019)
- 6 Yuri Kushnarev (2011,2019)

Top Point Scorers

- 19 Konstantin Rachkov
- 17 Yuri Kushnarev
- 10 Vladimir Ostroushko
- 10 Denis Simplikevich
- 5 Vasily Artemyev
- 5 Alexey Makovetskiy
- 5 Alexander Yanyushkin
- 5 Kirill Golosnitsky

Most Points In A Game

- 12 vs Australia - Konstantin Rachkov (2011)
- 9 vs Samoa - Yuri Kushnarev (2019)

Top Try Scorer

- 2 Vladimir Ostroushko
- 2 Denis Simplikevich
- 1 Vasily Artemyev
- 1 Alexey Makovetskiy
- 1 Alexander Yanyushkin
- 1 Konstantin Rachkov
- 1 Kirill Golosnitsky

Most Penalty Goals

- 4 Yuri Kushnarev
- 1 Konstantin Rachkov

Top Drop Goals

- 1 Konstantin Rachkov
- 1 Yuri Kushnarev

== Hosting ==
Russia has not hosted any World Cup games.
