= 2019 Rugby World Cup Pool A =

External videos
- Rugby World Cup 2019: Japan v Scotland on YouTube

Pool A of the 2019 Rugby World Cup began on 20 September 2019. The pool included hosts Japan, and previous 2015 Rugby World Cup quarter-finalists Ireland and Scotland. They were joined by the European qualifier, Russia, and Samoa, the winner of the European-Oceania Cross-Regional play-off.

Japan won all four of their matches, including surprise victories over both Ireland and Scotland, to finish top of the pool and become the first Asian nation to reach a Rugby World Cup quarter-final. Ireland picked up a bonus point in each of their matches, and their victory over Scotland in their opening pool match proved the difference between the two sides in the hunt for second place. Samoa finished in fourth place, their only win coming against bottom-placed Russia.

== Overview ==
The opening match of the 2019 Rugby World Cup was played in Pool A with Japan scoring a 30–10 win over Russia. Kotaro Matsushima became the first Japanese player to score a hat-trick at a World Cup. For the Russian side, Kirill Golosnitsky scored the first try of the tournament after four minutes – the fastest try ever scored in the opening match of a World Cup. Two days later, Ireland defeated Scotland 27–3. On 24 September, Samoa played their first match against Russia in Kumagaya. Despite Samoa's being reduced to 13 men after Rey Lee-Lo and Motu Matu'u were sin-binned within two minutes of each other, Russia could not capitalise on their advantage and Samoa went on to win 34–9. Four days later, hosts Japan defeated Ireland 19–12, scoring four out of six penalties. While it was an upset win for Japan, World Rugby later admitted three of the four offside penalties were incorrectly awarded to Japan. Kenki Fukuoka scored a try in the 58th minute to give Japan a two-point lead after Ireland's Garry Ringrose and Rob Kearney had scored the opening two tries. Yu Tamura's conversion and fourth successful penalty kick sealed the result for Japan. Scotland recorded their first victory of the World Cup with a 34–0 whitewash victory over Samoa in muggy conditions in Kobe, with Samoan captain Jack Lam stating that the rugby ball was "a bar of soap."

Three days later, Kobe Misaki Stadium held another match in Pool A – this time it was Ireland, who would whitewash their opponents (Russia) in a 35–0 victory with five different players getting tries for the Irish. The Irish though, did not have everything go right with Jordi Murphy being subbed off in the 27th minute due to a possible rib injury, which added to the Irish back row pain after losing Jack Conan earlier in the tournament. Japan recorded their third victory over Samoa in Toyota with a 85th minute try from Kotaro Matsushima sealing the Japanese a 38–19 bonus point victory. Russia in the final match of the tournament was hammered by Scotland 61–0 with George Horne scoring a hat-trick as the Scots became the first team in World Cup history to not concede a point from two World Cup matches. A red card to Bundee Aki in the 29th minute forced Ireland to go down to 14 men but that was the only blemish with Ireland winning 47–5 over Samoa in Fukuoka. Johnny Sexton scoring two tries for the Irish. Typhoon Hagibis saw the Japan–Scotland match under threat with the Scottish Rugby Union demanding legal action if it was cancelled. But after an inspection deemed the match to go ahead, Japan held their nerve against a fast-finishing Scotland to take home a 28–21 victory with Kenki Fukuoka scoring two tries. The win saw Japan become the first Tier 2 team to qualify since 2007, as they topped the group while Ireland finished in second place.

== Standings ==
Pos	Team	Pld	W	D	L	PF	PA	PD	T	B	Pts	Qualification
1	Japan	4	4	0	0	115	62	+53	13	3	19	Advanced to the quarter-finals and qualified for the 2023 Rugby World Cup
2	Ireland	4	3	0	1	121	27	+94	18	4	16	Advanced to the quarter-finals and qualified for the 2023 Rugby World Cup
3	Scotland	4	2	0	2	119	55	+64	16	3	11	Eliminated but qualified for 2023 Rugby World Cup
4	Samoa	4	1	0	3	58	128	−70	8	1	5	
5	Russia	4	0	0	4	19	160	−141	1	0	0	

== Matches ==
All times are local Japan Standard Time (UTC+09)

=== Japan vs Russia ===
20 September 2019
19:45 JST (UTC+09)

(1 BP) Japan	30–10	Russia
Try: Matsushima (3) 12' m, 39' c, 69' c Labuschagné 47' m Con: Tamura (1/3) 40'; Matsuda (1/1) 71'; Pen: Tamura (2/2) 44', 64'	Report	Try: Golosnitski 5' c Con: Kushnarev (1/1) 6'; Pen: Kushnarev (1/1) 61'

Tokyo Stadium, Chōfu
Attendance: 45,745
Referee: Nigel Owens (Wales)

Japan	Russia

FB	15	Will Tupou	(substituted off) 71'
RW	14	Kotaro Matsushima
OC	13	Timothy Lafaele
IC	12	Ryoto Nakamura
LW	11	Lomano Lemeki
FH	10	Yu Tamura	(substituted off) 67'
SH	9	Yutaka Nagare	(substituted off) 61'
N8	8	Kazuki Himeno
OF	7	Lappies Labuschagné
BF	6	Michael Leitch (c)	(substituted off) 71'
RL	5	James Moore
LL	4	Wimpie van der Walt	(substituted off) 61'
TP	3	Asaeli Ai Valu	(substituted off) 55'
HK	2	Shota Horie	(substituted off) 75'
LP	1	Keita Inagaki	(substituted off) 55'
Replacements:
HK	16	Atsushi Sakate	(substituted on) 75'
PR	17	Isileli Nakajima	(substituted on) 55'
PR	18	Koo Ji-won	(substituted on) 55'
LK	19	Luke Thompson	(substituted on) 60'
FL	20	Hendrik Tui	(substituted on) 71'
SH	21	Fumiaki Tanaka	(substituted on) 61'
FH	22	Rikiya Matsuda	(substituted on) 67'
FB	23	Ryohei Yamanaka	(substituted on) 71'
Coach:
(New Zealand) Jamie Joseph

FB	15	Vasily Artemyev (c)
RW	14	German Davydov
OC	13	Vladimir Ostroushko
IC	12	Dmitry Gerasimov	(substituted off) 68'
LW	11	Kirill Golosnitsky
FH	10	Yuri Kushnarev	(substituted off) 65'
SH	9	Vasily Dorofeev	(substituted off) 33'	(substituted on) 42'	(substituted off) 74'
N8	8	Nikita Vavilin
OF	7	Tagir Gadzhiev
BF	6	Vitaly Zhivatov	(substituted off) 65'
RL	5	Bogdan Fedotko	(substituted off) 61'
LL	4	Andrei Ostrikov
TP	3	Kirill Gotovtsev	(substituted off) 68'
HK	2	Stanislav Sel'skiy	(substituted off) 65'
LP	1	Valery Morozov	(substituted off) 65'
Replacements:
HK	16	Evgeny Matveev	(substituted on) 65'
PR	17	Andrei Polivalov	(substituted on) 65'
PR	18	Azamat Bitiev	(substituted on) 68'
LK	19	Andrey Garbuzov	(substituted on) 62'
FL	20	Anton Sychev	(substituted on) 65'
SH	21	Dmitry Perov	(substituted on) 33'	(substituted off) 42'	(substituted on) 74'
FH	22	Ramil Gaisin	(substituted on) 65'
WG	23	Vladislav Sozonov	(substituted on) 68'
Coach:
(Wales) Lyn Jones

Player of the Match:
Kotaro Matsushima (Japan)

Assistant referees:
Nic Berry (Australia)
Matthew Carley (England)
Television match official:
Ben Skeen (New Zealand)

Notes:

- This was the first Rugby World Cup opener not to feature a Tier 1 nation.
- Kotaro Matsushima (Japan) became the first Japanese player to score a hat-trick at a World Cup, and the first player to score one in a Rugby World Cup opener.
- Russia's try was the fastest to be scored in an opening match of a Rugby World Cup.

=== Ireland vs Scotland ===
22 September 2019
16:45 JST (UTC+09)

(1 BP) Ireland	27–3	Scotland
Try: Ja. Ryan 6' c Best 14' m Furlong 25' c Conway 56' m Con: Sexton (1/2) 8'; Murray (1/2) 27'; Pen: Carty (1/1) 68'	Report	Pen: Laidlaw (1/1) 21'

International Stadium Yokohama, Yokohama
Attendance: 63,731
Referee: Wayne Barnes (England)

Ireland	Scotland

FB	15	Jordan Larmour
RW	14	Andrew Conway
OC	13	Garry Ringrose
IC	12	Bundee Aki		(substituted off) 21'
LW	11	Jacob Stockdale
FH	10	Johnny Sexton		(substituted off) 58'
SH	9	Conor Murray		(substituted off) 58'
N8	8	CJ Stander
OF	7	Josh van der Flier		14' to 22'		(substituted off) 74'
BF	6	Peter O'Mahony				(substituted off) 27'
RL	5	James Ryan
LL	4	Iain Henderson		(substituted off) 58'
TP	3	Tadhg Furlong		(substituted off) 50'
HK	2	Rory Best (c)
LP	1	Cian Healy		(substituted off) 50'
Replacements:
HK	16	Niall Scannell				(substituted on) 74'
PR	17	Dave Kilcoyne		(substituted on) 50'
PR	18	Andrew Porter		(substituted on) 50'
LK	19	Tadhg Beirne	(yellow card) 70'	(substituted on) 58'
FL	20	Jack Conan		(substituted on) 14'	(substituted off) 22'	(substituted on) 27'
SH	21	Luke McGrath		(substituted on) 58'
FH	22	Jack Carty		(substituted on) 58'
CE	23	Chris Farrell		(substituted on) 21'
Coach:
(New Zealand) Joe Schmidt

FB	15	Stuart Hogg
RW	14	Tommy Seymour	(substituted off) 58'
OC	13	Duncan Taylor	(substituted off) 65'
IC	12	Sam Johnson
LW	11	Sean Maitland
FH	10	Finn Russell
SH	9	Greig Laidlaw	(substituted off) 62'
N8	8	Ryan Wilson
OF	7	Hamish Watson	(substituted off) 38'
BF	6	John Barclay	(substituted off) 53'
RL	5	Jonny Gray	(substituted off) 65'
LL	4	Grant Gilchrist
TP	3	WP Nel	(substituted off) 53'
HK	2	Stuart McInally (c)
LP	1	Allan Dell	(substituted off) 62'
Replacements:
HK	16	Fraser Brown	(substituted on) 38'
PR	17	Gordon Reid	(substituted on) 62'
PR	18	Simon Berghan	(substituted on) 53'
LK	19	Scott Cummings	(substituted on) 65'
FL	20	Blade Thomson	(substituted on) 53'
SH	21	Ali Price	(substituted on) 62'
CE	22	Chris Harris	(substituted on) 65'
WG	23	Darcy Graham	(substituted on) 58'
Coach:
(Scotland) Gregor Townsend

Player of the Match:
CJ Stander (Ireland)

Assistant referees:
Pascal Gaüzère (France)
Alexandre Ruiz (France)
Television match official:
Graham Hughes (England)

Notes:

- This was the first meeting between the two nations at a neutral venue.

=== Russia vs Samoa ===
24 September 2019
19:15 JST (UTC+09)

Russia	9–34	Samoa (1 BP)
Pen: Kushnarev (2/2) 19', 26'; Drop: Kushnarev (1/1) 48'	Report	Try: Leiua (2) 16' m, 80' m Amosa 45' m Fidow (2) 49' c, 53' c Lee-Lo 63' m Con: Pisi (2/5) 50', 54'

Kumagaya Rugby Stadium, Kumagaya
Attendance: 22,564
Referee: Romain Poite (France)

Russia	Samoa

FB	15	Vasily Artemyev (c)
RW	14	German Davydov
OC	13	Vladimir Ostroushko
IC	12	Dmitry Gerasimov		(substituted off) 65'
LW	11	Kirill Golosnitsky
FH	10	Yuri Kushnarev		(substituted off) 55'
SH	9	Vasily Dorofeev		(substituted off) 55'
N8	8	Nikita Vavilin		(substituted off) 65'
OF	7	Tagir Gadzhiev
BF	6	Vitaly Zhivatov
RL	5	Bogdan Fedotko
LL	4	Andrei Ostrikov		(substituted off) 65'
TP	3	Kirill Gotovtsev	(yellow card) 47'	(substituted off) 71'
HK	2	Stanislav Sel'skiy		(substituted off) 57'
LP	1	Valery Morozov		(substituted off) 59'
Replacements:
HK	16	Evgeny Matveev		(substituted on) 57'
PR	17	Andrey Polivalov		(substituted on) 59'
PR	18	Azamat Bitiev		(substituted on) 71'
LK	19	Andrey Garbuzov		(substituted on) 65'
FL	20	Anton Sychev		(substituted on) 21'
SH	21	Dmitry Perov		(substituted on) 22'
FH	22	Ramil Gaisin		(substituted on) 55'
WG	23	Vladislav Sozonov		(substituted on) 65'
Coach:
(Wales) Lyn Jones

FB	15	Tim Nanai-Williams		(substituted off) 65'
RW	14	Alapati Leiua
OC	13	Rey Lee-Lo	(yellow card) 29'
IC	12	Henry Taefu
LW	11	Ed Fidow
FH	10	Tusi Pisi		(substituted off) 65'
SH	9	Dwayne Polataivao		(substituted off) 40'
N8	8	Afa Amosa		(substituted off) 33'	(substituted on) 40'	(substituted off) 46'
OF	7	TJ Ioane
BF	6	Chris Vui (c)
RL	5	Kane Le'aupepe
LL	4	Filo Paulo		(substituted off) 65'
TP	3	Michael Alaalatoa		(substituted off) 55'
HK	2	Motu Matu'u	(yellow card) 31'		(substituted off) 40'
LP	1	Logovi'i Mulipola		(substituted off) 51'
Replacements:
HK	16	Ray Niuia		(substituted on) 33'
PR	17	Paul Alo-Emile		(substituted on) 55'
PR	18	Jordan Lay		(substituted on) 51'
LK	19	Senio Toleafoa		(substituted on) 65'
LK	20	Josh Tyrell				(substituted on) 46'
SH	21	Melani Matavao		(substituted on) 40'
FH	22	AJ Alatimu		(substituted on) 65'
FH	23	UJ Seuteni		(substituted on) 65'
Coach:
(New Zealand) Steve Jackson

Player of the Match:
Alapati Leiua (Samoa)

Assistant referees:
Jérôme Garcès (France)
Brendon Pickerill (New Zealand)
Television match official:
Graham Hughes (England)

Notes:

- This was the first meeting between the two nations.
- Ahsee Tuala was due to start the game, but was replaced with Henry Taefu following injury ahead of kick off.

=== Japan vs Ireland ===
28 September 2019
16:15 JST (UTC+09)

Japan	19–12	Ireland (1 BP)
Try: Fukuoka 59' c Con: Tamura (1/1) 61'; Pen: Tamura (4/6) 18', 34', 40', 72'	Report	Try: Ringrose 14' m Kearney 21' c Con: Carty (1/2) 22'

Shizuoka Stadium Ecopa, Fukuroi
Attendance: 47,813
Referee: Angus Gardner (Australia)

Japan	Ireland

FB	15	Ryohei Yamanaka	(substituted off) 50'
RW	14	Kotaro Matsushima
OC	13	Timothy Lafaele
IC	12	Ryoto Nakamura
LW	11	Lomano Lemeki
FH	10	Yu Tamura
SH	9	Yutaka Nagare	(substituted off) 56'
N8	8	Amanaki Mafi	(substituted off) 31'
OF	7	Lappies Labuschagné (c)
BF	6	Kazuki Himeno
RL	5	James Moore
LL	4	Luke Thompson	(substituted off) 64'
TP	3	Koo Ji-won	(substituted off) 54'
HK	2	Shota Horie
LP	1	Keita Inagaki	(substituted off) 64'
Replacements:
HK	16	Atsushi Sakate
PR	17	Isileli Nakajima	(substituted on) 64'
PR	18	Asaeli Ai Valu	(substituted on) 54'
LK	19	Wimpie van der Walt	(substituted on) 64'
FL	20	Michael Leitch	(substituted on) 31'
SH	21	Fumiaki Tanaka	(substituted on) 57'
FH	22	Rikiya Matsuda
WG	23	Kenki Fukuoka	(substituted on) 50'
Coach:
(New Zealand) Jamie Joseph

FB	15	Rob Kearney	(substituted off) 68'
RW	14	Keith Earls
OC	13	Garry Ringrose
IC	12	Chris Farrell	(substituted off) 61'
LW	11	Jacob Stockdale
FH	10	Jack Carty	(substituted off) 61'
SH	9	Conor Murray
N8	8	CJ Stander
OF	7	Josh van der Flier
BF	6	Peter O'Mahony	(substituted off) 55'
RL	5	James Ryan
LL	4	Iain Henderson	(substituted off) 66'
TP	3	Tadhg Furlong	(substituted off) 61'
HK	2	Rory Best (c)	(substituted off) 61'
LP	1	Cian Healy	(substituted off) 46'
Replacements:
HK	16	Seán Cronin	(substituted on) 61'
PR	17	Dave Kilcoyne	(substituted on) 46'
PR	18	Andrew Porter	(substituted on) 61'
LK	19	Tadhg Beirne	(substituted on) 66'
FL	20	Rhys Ruddock	(substituted on) 53'
SH	21	Luke McGrath	(substituted on) 66'
FH	22	Joey Carbery	(substituted on) 61'
FB	23	Jordan Larmour	(substituted on) 61'
Coach:
(New Zealand) Joe Schmidt

Player of the Match:
Shota Horie (Japan)

Assistant referees:
Jérôme Garcès (France)
Matthew Carley (England)
Television match official:
Ben Skeen (New Zealand)

Notes:

- Will Tupou was due to start the game, but was replaced by Lomano Lemeki due to injury ahead of kick off.
- Iain Henderson (Ireland) earned his 50th test cap.
- This is Japan's first victory over Ireland.
- This is Ireland's first Rugby World Cup pool stage loss since losing 30–15 to Argentina during the 2007 Rugby World Cup.
- This is Ireland's first loss to a Tier 2 nation since losing 40–25 to Samoa in 1996.
- This is the first time that Ireland has failed to score any points in the second half of a match since their match against France in the 2016 Six Nations Championship.

=== Scotland vs Samoa ===
30 September 2019
19:15 JST (UTC+09)

(1 BP) Scotland	34–0	Samoa
Try: Maitland 30' c Laidlaw 34' c Penalty try (2) 57', 75'; Con: Laidlaw (2/2) 31', 36'; Pen: Laidlaw (1/1) 9'; Drop: Hogg (1/1) 38'	Report

Kobe Misaki Stadium, Kobe
Attendance: 27,586
Referee: Pascal Gaüzère (France)

Scotland	Samoa

FB	15	Stuart Hogg
RW	14	Darcy Graham
OC	13	Chris Harris
IC	12	Sam Johnson	(substituted off) 64'
LW	11	Sean Maitland
FH	10	Finn Russell	(substituted off) 75'
SH	9	Greig Laidlaw	(substituted off) 64'
N8	8	Blade Thomson
OF	7	Jamie Ritchie
BF	6	Magnus Bradbury	(substituted off) 73'
RL	5	Jonny Gray
LL	4	Grant Gilchrist	(substituted off) 52'
TP	3	WP Nel	(substituted off) 58'
HK	2	Stuart McInally (c)	(substituted off) 52'
LP	1	Allan Dell	(substituted off) 13'
Replacements:
HK	16	Fraser Brown	(substituted on) 52'
PR	17	Gordon Reid	(substituted on) 13'
PR	18	Zander Fagerson	(substituted on) 58'
LK	19	Scott Cummings	(substituted on) 52'
N8	20	Ryan Wilson	(substituted on) 73'
SH	21	George Horne	(substituted on) 64'
FH	22	Adam Hastings	(substituted on) 75'
CE	23	Duncan Taylor	(substituted on) 64'
Coach:
(Scotland) Gregor Townsend

FB	15	Tim Nanai-Williams
RW	14	Belgium Tuatagaloa		(substituted off) 45'
OC	13	Alapati Leiua
IC	12	Henry Taefu
LW	11	Ed Fidow	(yellow card) 57' (yellow-red card) 75'
FH	10	Tusi Pisi		(substituted off) 54'
SH	9	Melani Matavao		(substituted off) 71'
N8	8	Jack Lam (c)		(substituted off) 3'	(substituted on) 14'
OF	7	TJ Ioane				(substituted off) 66'
BF	6	Chris Vui
RL	5	Kane Le'aupepe
LL	4	Filo Paulo		(substituted off) 51'	(substituted on) 79'
TP	3	Michael Alaalatoa		(substituted off) 44'
HK	2	Ray Niuia		(substituted off) 54'
LP	1	Logovi'i Mulipola		(substituted off) 44'
Replacements:
HK	16	Seilala Lam		(substituted on) 54'
PR	17	Paul Alo-Emile		(substituted on) 47'
PR	18	Jordan Lay		(substituted on) 44'
FL	19	Piula Fa'asalele		(substituted on) 51'	(substituted off) 79'
LK	20	Josh Tyrell		(substituted on) 4'	(substituted off) 14'	(substituted on) 66'
SH	21	Pele Cowley		(substituted on) 71'
FH	22	UJ Seuteni		(substituted on) 54'
CE	23	Kieron Fonotia		(substituted on) 45'
Coach:
(New Zealand) Steve Jackson

Player of the Match:
Jonny Gray (Scotland)

Assistant referees:
Nigel Owens (Wales)
Federico Anselmi (Argentina)
Television match official:
Graham Hughes (England)

Notes:

- This is the first time since beating Italy 29–0 in 2017 that Scotland have kept their opponents scoreless, and the first time ever against Samoa. The last time they did so at a Rugby World Cup was in 2007, when they beat Romania 42–0.
- This is the first time that Samoa has failed to score any points in a Rugby World Cup match.

=== Ireland vs Russia ===
3 October 2019
19:15 JST (UTC+09)

(1 BP) Ireland	35–0	Russia
Try: Kearney 2' c O'Mahony 13' c Ruddock 35' c Conway 62' c Ringrose 76' c Con: Sexton (3/3) 4', 15', 37'; Carty (2/2) 63', 77'	Report

Kobe Misaki Stadium, Kobe
Attendance: 26,856
Referee: Jérôme Garcès (France)

Ireland	Russia

FB	15	Rob Kearney	(substituted off) 50'
RW	14	Andrew Conway
OC	13	Garry Ringrose
IC	12	Bundee Aki
LW	11	Keith Earls
FH	10	Johnny Sexton (c)	(substituted off) 40'
SH	9	Luke McGrath
N8	8	Jordi Murphy	(substituted off) 27'
OF	7	Peter O'Mahony
BF	6	Rhys Ruddock
RL	5	Jean Kleyn	(substituted off) 61'
LL	4	Tadhg Beirne
TP	3	John Ryan	(substituted off) 58'
HK	2	Niall Scannell	(substituted off) 58'
LP	1	Dave Kilcoyne	(substituted off) 58'
Replacements:
HK	16	Seán Cronin	(substituted on) 58'
PR	17	Andrew Porter	(substituted on) 58'
PR	18	Tadhg Furlong	(substituted on) 58'
LK	19	Iain Henderson	(substituted on) 61'
N8	20	CJ Stander	(substituted on) 27'
SH	21	Conor Murray
FH	22	Jack Carty	(substituted on) 40'
FB	23	Jordan Larmour	(substituted on) 50'
Coach:
(New Zealand) Joe Schmidt

FB	15	Vasily Artemyev (c)
RW	14	German Davydov
OC	13	Igor Galinovskiy
IC	12	Kirill Golosnitsky		(substituted off) 15'
LW	11	Denis Simplikevich		(substituted off) 71'
FH	10	Ramil Gaisin
SH	9	Dmitry Perov
N8	8	Victor Gresev
OF	7	Tagir Gadzhiev
BF	6	Anton Sychev		(substituted off) 70'
RL	5	Bogdan Fedotko	(yellow card) 34'	(substituted off) 64'
LL	4	Andrey Garbuzov		(substituted off) 50'
TP	3	Kirill Gotovtsev		(substituted off) 68'
HK	2	Evgeny Matveev		(substituted off) 40'
LP	1	Andrey Polivalov		(substituted off) 40'
Replacements:
HK	16	Stanislav Sel'skiy		(substituted on) 40'
PR	17	Valery Morozov		(substituted on) 40'
PR	18	Vladimir Podrezov		(substituted on) 68'
LK	19	Andrei Ostrikov	(yellow card) 51'	(substituted on) 50'
LK	20	Evgeny Elgin		(substituted on) 64'
FH	21	Sergey Yanyushkin		(substituted on) 71'
FL	22	Roman Khodin		(substituted on) 70'
CE	23	Vladimir Ostroushko		(substituted on) 15'
Coach:
(Wales) Lyn Jones

Player of the Match:
Rhys Ruddock (Ireland)

Assistant referees:
Mathieu Raynal (France)
Brendon Pickerill (New Zealand)
Television match official:
Ben Skeen (New Zealand)

Notes:

- Igor Galinovskiy (Russia) earned his 50th test cap.

=== Japan vs Samoa ===
5 October 2019
19:30 JST (UTC+09)

(1 BP) Japan	38–19	Samoa
Try: Lafaele 28' c Himeno 53' c Fukuoka 76' m Matsushima 80+5' c Con: Tamura (3/4) 29', 55', 80+7'; Pen: Tamura (4/5) 3', 8', 24', 51'	Report	Try: Taefu 73' c Con: Taefu (1/1) 74'; Pen: Taefu (4/5) 10', 15', 34', 45'

City of Toyota Stadium, Toyota
Attendance: 39,695
Referee: Jaco Peyper (South Africa)

Japan	Samoa

FB	15	Ryohei Yamanaka	(substituted off) 57'
RW	14	Kotaro Matsushima
OC	13	Timothy Lafaele
IC	12	Ryoto Nakamura	(substituted off) 70'
LW	11	Lomano Lemeki
FH	10	Yu Tamura
SH	9	Yutaka Nagare	(substituted off) 63'
N8	8	Kazuki Himeno
OF	7	Lappies Labuschagné (c)
BF	6	Michael Leitch	(substituted off) 64'
RL	5	James Moore
LL	4	Wimpie van der Walt	(substituted off) 68'
TP	3	Koo Ji-won	(substituted off) 52'
HK	2	Atsushi Sakate	(substituted off) 40'
LP	1	Keita Inagaki	(substituted off) 52'
Replacements:
HK	16	Shota Horie	(substituted on) 40'
PR	17	Isileli Nakajima	(substituted on) 52'
PR	18	Asaeli Ai Valu	(substituted on) 52'
LK	19	Uwe Helu	(substituted on) 68'
FL	20	Hendrik Tui	(substituted on) 64'
SH	21	Fumiaki Tanaka	(substituted on) 63'
FH	22	Rikiya Matsuda	(substituted on) 70'
WG	23	Kenki Fukuoka	(substituted on) 57'
Coach:
(New Zealand) Jamie Joseph

FB	15	Tim Nanai-Williams		(substituted off) 40'
RW	14	Ahsee Tuala		(substituted off) 55'
OC	13	Alapati Leiua
IC	12	Henry Taefu
LW	11	Ed Fidow
FH	10	UJ Seuteni
SH	9	Dwayne Polataivao		(substituted off) 66'
N8	8	Jack Lam (c)
OF	7	TJ Ioane	(yellow card) 25'	(substituted off) 70'
BF	6	Chris Vui
RL	5	Kane Le'aupepe
LL	4	Piula Fa'asalele		(substituted off) 61'
TP	3	Michael Alaalatoa		(substituted off) 56'
HK	2	Seilala Lam		(substituted off) 56'
LP	1	Jordan Lay		(substituted off) 66'
Replacements:
HK	16	Ray Niuia		(substituted on) 56'
PR	17	Paul Alo-Emile		(substituted on) 66'
PR	18	James Lay		(substituted on) 56'
LK	19	Senio Toleafoa		(substituted on) 61'
LK	20	Josh Tyrell		(substituted on) 70'
SH	21	Pele Cowley		(substituted on) 66'
FH	22	Tusi Pisi		(substituted on) 55'
CE	23	Kieron Fonotia		(substituted on) 40'
Coach:
(New Zealand) Steve Jackson

Player of the Match:
Lomano Lemeki (Japan)

Assistant referees:
Angus Gardner (Australia)
Federico Anselmi (Argentina)
Television match official:
Graham Hughes (England)

Notes:

- Ben O'Keeffe was due to be part of the officiating team for this game, but swapped with Angus Gardner's appointment between England and Argentina.

=== Scotland vs Russia ===
9 October 2019
16:15 JST (UTC+09)

(1 BP) Scotland	61–0	Russia
Try: Hastings (2) 14' c, 18' c G. Horne (3) 22' c, 45' c, 59' m Turner 51' c Seymour 56' c Barclay 75' c McInally 78' c Con: Hastings (8/9) 15', 20', 24', 46', 53', 57', 76', 80'	Report

Shizuoka Stadium Ecopa, Fukuroi
Attendance: 44,123
Referee: Wayne Barnes (England)

Scotland	Russia

FB	15	Blair Kinghorn
RW	14	Tommy Seymour
OC	13	Duncan Taylor
IC	12	Peter Horne
LW	11	Darcy Graham	(substituted off) 47'
FH	10	Adam Hastings
SH	9	George Horne	(substituted off) 65'
N8	8	Ryan Wilson
OF	7	Fraser Brown	(substituted off) 31'
BF	6	John Barclay (c)
RL	5	Ben Toolis
LL	4	Scott Cummings	(substituted off) 61'
TP	3	Zander Fagerson	(substituted off) 40'
HK	2	George Turner	(substituted off) 65'
LP	1	Gordon Reid	(substituted off) 61'
Replacements:
HK	16	Stuart McInally	(substituted on) 65'
PR	17	Simon Berghan	(substituted on) 40'
PR	18	W. P. Nel	(substituted on) 61'
LK	19	Grant Gilchrist	(substituted on) 61'
FL	20	Magnus Bradbury	(substituted on) 31'
FL	21	Jamie Ritchie
SH	22	Henry Pyrgos	(substituted on) 47'
CE	23	Chris Harris	(substituted on) 65'
Coach:
(Scotland) Gregor Townsend

FB	15	Vasily Artemyev (c)			(substituted off) 61'
RW	14	German Davydov
OC	13	Vladimir Ostroushko	(substituted off) 38'	(substituted on) 40'
IC	12	Dmitry Gerasimov
LW	11	Vladislav Sozonov
FH	10	Ramil Gaisin	(substituted off) 65'
SH	9	Dmitry Perov
N8	8	Nikita Vavilin	(substituted off) 58'
OF	7	Tagir Gadzhiev
BF	6	Vitaly Zhivatov
RL	5	Evgeny Elgin	(substituted off) 50'
LL	4	Andrei Ostrikov	(substituted off) 69'
TP	3	Kirill Gotovtsev	(substituted off) 61'
HK	2	Stanislav Sel'skiy	(substituted off) 61'
LP	1	Valery Morozov	(substituted off) 61'
Replacements:
HK	16	Sergey Chernyshev	(substituted on) 61'
PR	17	Azamat Bitiev	(substituted on) 61'
PR	18	Vladimir Podrezov	(substituted on) 61'
LK	19	Bogdan Fedotko	(substituted on) 50'
LK	20	Andrey Garbuzov	(substituted on) 69'
FH	21	Sergey Yanyushkin	(substituted on) 65'
N8	22	Anton Sychev	(substituted on) 58'
FH	23	Yuri Kushnarev	(substituted on) 38'	(substituted off) 40'	(substituted on) 61'
Coach:
(Wales) Lyn Jones

Player of the Match:
Adam Hastings (Scotland)

Assistant referees:
Alexandre Ruiz (France)
Federico Anselmi (Argentina)
Television match official:
Marius Jonker (South Africa)

Notes:

- This is the first meeting between the two nations.
- Vladimir Ostroushko (Russia) earned his 50th test cap.
- Scotland became the first team to hold their opponents to nil points more than once in a single World Cup campaign.
- Mathieu Raynal was due to referee this game but withdrew ahead of kick off due to illness – Wayne Barnes stepped up from assistant with Alexandre Ruiz covering the assistant role.

=== Ireland vs Samoa ===
12 October 2019
19:45 JST (UTC+09)

(1 BP) Ireland	47–5	Samoa
Try: Best 4' c Furlong 10' c Sexton (2) 21' c, 39' m Larmour 48' c Stander 65' c Conway 70' c Con: Sexton (4/5) 5', 11', 23', 50; Carbery (2/2) 67', 72'	Report	Try: J. Lam 26' m

Fukuoka Hakatanomori Stadium, Fukuoka
Attendance: 17,967
Referee: Nic Berry (Australia)

Ireland	Samoa

FB	15	Jordan Larmour
RW	14	Keith Earls
OC	13	Robbie Henshaw		(substituted off) 62'
IC	12	Bundee Aki	(red card) 29'
LW	11	Jacob Stockdale
FH	10	Johnny Sexton		(substituted off) 51'
SH	9	Conor Murray		(substituted off) 53'
N8	8	CJ Stander
OF	7	Josh van der Flier
BF	6	Tadhg Beirne		(substituted off) 60'
RL	5	James Ryan		(substituted off) 57'
LL	4	Iain Henderson
TP	3	Tadhg Furlong		(substituted off) 45'
HK	2	Rory Best (c)		(substituted off) 50'
LP	1	Cian Healy		(substituted off) 57'
Replacements:
HK	16	Niall Scannell		(substituted on) 50'
PR	17	Dave Kilcoyne		(substituted on) 57'
PR	18	Andrew Porter		(substituted on) 45'
LK	19	Jean Kleyn		(substituted on) 57'
FL	20	Peter O'Mahony		(substituted on) 60'
SH	21	Luke McGrath		(substituted on) 53'
FH	22	Joey Carbery		(substituted on) 51'
WG	23	Andrew Conway		(substituted on) 62'
Coach:
(New Zealand) Joe Schmidt

FB	15	Tim Nanai-Williams
RW	14	Ahsee Tuala
OC	13	Alapati Leiua
IC	12	Henry Taefu
LW	11	Ed Fidow		(substituted off) 50'
FH	10	UJ Seuteni		(substituted off) 29'
SH	9	Dwayne Polataivao		(substituted off) 70'
N8	8	Jack Lam (c)
OF	7	TJ Ioane	(yellow card) 59'	(substituted off) 70'
BF	6	Chris Vui
RL	5	Kane Le'aupepe
LL	4	Filo Paulo		(substituted off) 14'	(substituted on) 17'	(substituted off) 54'
TP	3	Michael Alaalatoa		(substituted off) 54'
HK	2	Seilala Lam	(yellow card) 6'			(substituted off) 47'
LP	1	Logovi'i Mulipola		(substituted off) 47'
Replacements:
HK	16	Ray Niuia		(substituted on) 14'	(substituted off) 17'	(substituted on) 47'
PR	17	Paul Alo-Emile		(substituted on) 47'
PR	18	Jordan Lay		(substituted on) 54'
FL	19	Piula Faʻasalele				(substituted on) 54'
LK	20	Josh Tyrell		(substituted on) 70'
SH	21	Pele Cowley		(substituted on) 70'
FH	22	Tusi Pisi		(substituted on) 29'
CE	23	Kieron Fonotia		(substituted on) 50'
Coach:
(New Zealand) Steve Jackson

Player of the Match:
Jordan Larmour (Ireland)

Assistant referees:
Romain Poite (France)
Brendon Pickerill (New Zealand)
Television match official:
Rowan Kitt (England)

=== Japan vs Scotland ===
13 October 2019
19:45 JST (UTC+09)

(1 BP) Japan	28–21	Scotland (1 BP)
Try: Matsushima 18' c Inagaki 26' c Fukuoka (2) 40' c, 43' c Con: Tamura (4/4) 20', 27', 40+2', 44'	Report	Try: Russell 7' c Nel 50' c Fagerson 55' c Con: Laidlaw (2/2) 8', 51'; Russell (1/1) 56'

International Stadium Yokohama, Yokohama
Attendance: 67,666
Referee: Ben O'Keeffe (New Zealand)

Japan	Scotland

FB	15	Will Tupou	(substituted off) 51'
RW	14	Kotaro Matsushima
OC	13	Timothy Lafaele
IC	12	Ryoto Nakamura	(substituted off) 75'
LW	11	Kenki Fukuoka
FH	10	Yu Tamura
SH	9	Yutaka Nagare	(substituted off) 51'
N8	8	Kazuki Himeno
OF	7	Lappies Labuschagné
BF	6	Michael Leitch (c)	(substituted off) 73'
RL	5	James Moore	(substituted off) 52'
LL	4	Luke Thompson
TP	3	Koo Ji-won	(substituted off) 22'
HK	2	Shota Horie	(substituted off) 73'
LP	1	Keita Inagaki	(substituted off) 57'
Replacements:
HK	16	Atsushi Sakate	(substituted on) 73'
PR	17	Isileli Nakajima	(substituted on) 57'
PR	18	Asaeli Ai Valu	(substituted on) 22'
LK	19	Uwe Helu	(substituted on) 52'
FL	20	Hendrik Tui	(substituted on) 73'
SH	21	Fumiaki Tanaka	(substituted on) 51'
FH	22	Rikiya Matsuda	(substituted on) 75'
FB	23	Ryohei Yamanaka	(substituted on) 51'
Coach:
(New Zealand) Jamie Joseph

FB	15	Stuart Hogg
RW	14	Tommy Seymour	(substituted off) 52'
OC	13	Chris Harris
IC	12	Sam Johnson
LW	11	Darcy Graham	(substituted off) 60'
FH	10	Finn Russell
SH	9	Greig Laidlaw (c)	(substituted off) 52'
N8	8	Blade Thomson
OF	7	Jamie Ritchie
BF	6	Magnus Bradbury	(substituted off) 66'
RL	5	Jonny Gray
LL	4	Grant Gilchrist	(substituted off) 52'
TP	3	WP Nel	(substituted off) 52'
HK	2	Fraser Brown	(substituted off) 52'
LP	1	Allan Dell	(substituted off) 52'
Replacements:
HK	16	Stuart McInally	(substituted on) 52'
PR	17	Gordon Reid	(substituted on) 52'
PR	18	Zander Fagerson	(substituted on) 52'
LK	19	Scott Cummings	(substituted on) 52'
N8	20	Ryan Wilson	(substituted on) 66'
SH	21	George Horne	(substituted on) 52'
CE	22	Peter Horne	(substituted on) 61'
FB	23	Blair Kinghorn	(substituted on) 52'
Coach:
(Scotland) Gregor Townsend

Player of the Match:
Kenki Fukuoka (Japan)

Assistant referees:
Mathieu Raynal (France)
Matthew Carley (England)
Television match official:
Marius Jonker (South Africa)

Notes:

- This was Scotland's 700th test match.
- This was Japan's first win over Scotland.
- This was the first time that a Tier 2 nation had defeated two Tier 1 nations in a single World Cup tournament.
- With this win, Japan topped the pool and advanced to the quarter-finals for the first time – the first Asian side to do so.
- Japan became the first Tier 2 nation since Fiji in 2007, and the fourth ever, to advance to the quarter-finals.
- Japan became the first Tier 2 nation to top their pool and win all of their pool games.
- The game was at risk of cancellation due to the after effects of Typhoon Hagibis the previous night. There was a lot of determination that, of all games, this one would be played. During the early hours of that morning a clean up operation was carried out by a large number of local residents. After an appeal put out by stadium management, they had spent the night in the stadium to be sure of being there as soon as the worst of the typhoon had passed. To get the venue match-ready mud had to be cleaned up and the entire pitch was dried by hand with towels. It was passed safe by 1100 and the game went ahead.
