= 2019 Rugby World Cup knockout stage =

The knockout stage of the 2019 Rugby World Cup began on 19 October and concluded on 2 November with the final at the International Stadium Yokohama in Yokohama, Japan.

== Qualified teams ==
England became the first team to qualify for the knock-out stage of the World Cup, with a game in hand, after winning their opening three games of the pool stage. France became the second team to qualify for the last eight to complete the two teams that advanced out of Pool C. South Africa secured their spot in the quarter-finals after their final pool match victory over Canada. After the match cancellations, New Zealand confirmed their place in the quarter-finals as pool winners. Wales confirmed their place in the quarter-finals with a game in hand after their win over Fiji; that result also confirmed Australia's advancement to the knock-out stage. Ireland secured their progression to the quarter-finals following their victory over Samoa in their final match. In the last pool stage match, home team Japan secured their top place in Pool A by beating Scotland and advanced to the quarter-finals for the first time in World Cup history.

Pool	Winners	Runners-up
A	Japan	Ireland
B	New Zealand	South Africa
C	England	France
D	Wales	Australia

== Bracket ==
Quarter-finals
19 October – Ōita
England	40
Australia	16
19 October – Chōfu
New Zealand	46
Ireland	14
20 October – Ōita
Wales	20
France	19
20 October – Chōfu
Japan	3
South Africa	26

Semi-finals
26 October – Yokohama
England	19
New Zealand	7
27 October – Yokohama
Wales	16
South Africa	19

Final
2 November – Yokohama
England	12
South Africa	32
Third place
1 November – Chōfu
New Zealand	40
Wales	17

== Quarter-finals ==
=== England vs Australia ===
19 October 2019
16:15 JST (UTC+09)

England	40–16	Australia
Try: May (2) 18' c, 21' c Sinckler 46' c Watson 76' c Con: Farrell (4/4) 19', 23', 47', 77'; Pen: Farrell (4/4) 30', 51', 66', 73'	Report	Try: Koroibete 43' c Con: Lealiifano (1/1) 44'; Pen: Lealiifano (3/3) 12', 26', 41'

Ōita Stadium, Ōita
Attendance: 36,954
Referee: Jérôme Garcès (France)

England	Australia

FB	15	Elliot Daly
RW	14	Anthony Watson
OC	13	Henry Slade	(substituted off) 61'
IC	12	Manu Tuilagi	(substituted off) 75'
LW	11	Jonny May
FH	10	Owen Farrell (c)
SH	9	Ben Youngs	(substituted off) 73'
N8	8	Billy Vunipola
OF	7	Sam Underhill	(substituted off) 69'
BF	6	Tom Curry
RL	5	Courtney Lawes	(substituted off) 64'
LL	4	Maro Itoje
TP	3	Kyle Sinckler	(substituted off) 64'
HK	2	Jamie George	(substituted off) 69'
LP	1	Mako Vunipola	(substituted off) 69'
Replacements:
HK	16	Luke Cowan-Dickie	(substituted in) 69'
PR	17	Joe Marler	(substituted in) 69'
PR	18	Dan Cole	(substituted in) 64'
LK	19	George Kruis	(substituted in) 64'
FL	20	Lewis Ludlam	(substituted in) 69'
SH	21	Willi Heinz	(substituted in) 73'
FH	22	George Ford	(substituted in) 61'
CE	23	Jonathan Joseph	(substituted in) 75'
Coach:
(Australia) Eddie Jones

FB	15	Kurtley Beale
RW	14	Reece Hodge
OC	13	Jordan Petaia	(substituted off) 74'
IC	12	Samu Kerevi
LW	11	Marika Koroibete
FH	10	Christian Lealiifano	(substituted off) 53'
SH	9	Will Genia	(substituted off) 61'
N8	8	Isi Naisarani	(substituted off) 69'
OF	7	Michael Hooper (c)
BF	6	David Pocock
RL	5	Rory Arnold	(substituted off) 66'
LL	4	Izack Rodda
TP	3	Allan Alaalatoa	(substituted off) 61'
HK	2	Tolu Latu	(substituted off) 66'
LP	1	Scott Sio	(substituted off) 69'
Replacements:
HK	16	Jordan Uelese	(substituted in) 66'
PR	17	James Slipper	(substituted in) 69'
PR	18	Taniela Tupou	(substituted in) 61'
LK	19	Adam Coleman	(substituted in) 66'
FL	20	Lukhan Salakaia-Loto	(substituted in) 69'
SH	21	Nic White	(substituted in) 61'
FH	22	Matt To'omua	(substituted in) 53'
CE	23	James O'Connor	(substituted in) 74'
Coach:
(Australia) Michael Cheika

Player of the Match:
Tom Curry (England)

Assistant referees:
Romain Poite (France)
Mathieu Raynal (France)
Television match official:
Ben Skeen (New Zealand)

Notes:

- Jonny May (England) earned his 50th test cap.
- This was Australia's largest Rugby World Cup defeat, surpassing the 17-point loss against New Zealand in the 2015 final, as well as the most points they had conceded in a World Cup match, and the highest scoring match between these teams in a World Cup.

=== New Zealand vs Ireland ===
19 October 2019
19:15 JST (UTC+09)

New Zealand	46–14	Ireland
Try: A. Smith (2) 14' c, 20' c B. Barrett 32' m Taylor 48' c Todd 61' m Bridge 73' c J. Barrett 79' m Con: Mo'unga (4/7) 15', 22', 49', 74'; Pen: Mo'unga (1/1) 6'	Report	Try: Henshaw 69' c Penalty try 76'; Con: Carbery (1/1) 69'

Tokyo Stadium, Chōfu
Attendance: 46,686
Referee: Nigel Owens (Wales)

New Zealand	Ireland

FB	15	Beauden Barrett
RW	14	Sevu Reece		(substituted off) 64'
OC	13	Jack Goodhue		(substituted off) 54'
IC	12	Anton Lienert-Brown
LW	11	George Bridge
FH	10	Richie Mo'unga
SH	9	Aaron Smith		(substituted off) 62'
N8	8	Kieran Read (c)
OF	7	Sam Cane		(substituted off) 40'
BF	6	Ardie Savea
RL	5	Sam Whitelock
LL	4	Brodie Retallick		(substituted off) 58'
TP	3	Nepo Laulala		(substituted off) 50'
HK	2	Codie Taylor		(substituted off) 62'
LP	1	Joe Moody		(substituted off) 50'
Replacements:
HK	16	Dane Coles		(substituted in) 62'
PR	17	Ofa Tu'ungafasi		(substituted in) 50'
PR	18	Angus Ta'avao		(substituted in) 50'
LK	19	Scott Barrett		(substituted in) 40'
FL	20	Matt Todd	(yellow card) 77'	(substituted in) 58'
SH	21	TJ Perenara		(substituted in) 62'
CE	22	Sonny Bill Williams		(substituted in) 64'
FB	23	Jordie Barrett		(substituted in) 54'
Coach:
(New Zealand) Steve Hansen

FB	15	Rob Kearney					(substituted off) 53'
RW	14	Keith Earls
OC	13	Garry Ringrose	5' to 10'
IC	12	Robbie Henshaw			22' to 27'
LW	11	Jacob Stockdale
FH	10	Johnny Sexton	(substituted off) 63'
SH	9	Conor Murray	(substituted off) 74'
N8	8	CJ Stander
OF	7	Josh van der Flier
BF	6	Peter O'Mahony	(substituted off) 57'
RL	5	James Ryan
LL	4	Iain Henderson	(substituted off) 49'
TP	3	Tadhg Furlong	(substituted off) 61'
HK	2	Rory Best (c)	(substituted off) 63'
LP	1	Cian Healy	(substituted off) 49'
Replacements:
HK	16	Niall Scannell	(substituted in) 63'
PR	17	Dave Kilcoyne	(substituted in) 49'
PR	18	Andrew Porter	(substituted in) 61'
LK	19	Tadhg Beirne	(substituted in) 49'
FL	20	Rhys Ruddock	(substituted in) 57'
SH	21	Luke McGrath	(substituted in) 74'
FH	22	Joey Carbery	(substituted in) 63'
FB	23	Jordan Larmour	(substituted in) 5'	(substituted off) 10'	(substituted in) 22'	(substituted off) 27'	(substituted in) 53'
Coach:
(New Zealand) Joe Schmidt

Player of the Match:
Beauden Barrett (New Zealand)

Assistant referees:
Pascal Gaüzère (France)
Angus Gardner (Australia)
Television match official:
Graham Hughes (England)

Notes:

- This was Ireland's largest defeat in a World Cup match surpassing their 43–19 defeat to New Zealand in 1995.

=== Wales vs France ===
20 October 2019
16:15 JST (UTC+09)

Wales	20–19	France
Try: Wainwright 12' c Moriarty 74' c Con: Biggar (2/2) 13', 75'; Pen: Biggar (2/2) 20', 54'	Report	Try: Vahaamahina 5' m Ollivon 8' c Vakatawa 31' c Con: Ntamack (2/3) 9', 32'

Ōita Stadium, Ōita
Attendance: 34,426
Referee: Jaco Peyper (South Africa)

Wales	France

FB	15	Liam Williams
RW	14	George North
OC	13	Owen Watkin
IC	12	Hadleigh Parkes
LW	11	Josh Adams
FH	10	Dan Biggar
SH	9	Gareth Davies		(substituted off) 55'
N8	8	Josh Navidi		(substituted off) 28'
OF	7	Justin Tipuric
BF	6	Aaron Wainwright
RL	5	Alun Wyn Jones (c)
LL	4	Jake Ball		(substituted off) 63'
TP	3	Tomas Francis		(substituted off) 63'
HK	2	Ken Owens		(substituted off) 76'
LP	1	Wyn Jones		(substituted off) 63'
Replacements:
HK	16	Elliot Dee		(substituted in) 76'
PR	17	Rhys Carré		(substituted in) 63'
PR	18	Dillon Lewis		(substituted in) 63'
LK	19	Adam Beard		(substituted in) 63'
N8	20	Ross Moriarty	(yellow card) 29'	(substituted in) 28'
SH	21	Tomos Williams		(substituted in) 55'
FH	22	Rhys Patchell
FB	23	Leigh Halfpenny
Coach:
(New Zealand) Warren Gatland

FB	15	Maxime Médard		(substituted off) 78'
RW	14	Damian Penaud
OC	13	Virimi Vakatawa
IC	12	Gaël Fickou
LW	11	Yoann Huget
FH	10	Romain Ntamack		(substituted off) 40'
SH	9	Antoine Dupont		(substituted off) 73'
N8	8	Gregory Alldritt		(substituted off) 55'
OF	7	Charles Ollivon
BF	6	Wenceslas Lauret
RL	5	Sébastien Vahaamahina	(red card) 49'
LL	4	Bernard Le Roux		(substituted off) 66'
TP	3	Rabah Slimani		(substituted off) 73'
HK	2	Guilhem Guirado (c)		(substituted off) 50'
LP	1	Jefferson Poirot		(substituted off) 68'
Replacements:
HK	16	Camille Chat		(substituted in) 50'
PR	17	Cyril Baille		(substituted in) 68'
PR	18	Emerick Setiano		(substituted in) 73'
LK	19	Paul Gabrillagues		(substituted in) 55'
N8	20	Louis Picamoles		(substituted in) 66'
SH	21	Baptiste Serin		(substituted in) 73'
FH	22	Camille Lopez		(substituted in) 40'
WG	23	Vincent Rattez		(substituted in) 78'
Coach:
(France) Jacques Brunel

Player of the Match:
Aaron Wainwright (Wales)

Assistant referees:
Nic Berry (Australia)
Paul Williams (New Zealand)
Television match official:
Marius Jonker (South Africa)

Notes:

- Jonathan Davies was due to start in this game, but withdrew ahead of kick-off due to injury. Owen Watkin replaced Davies in the starting XV with Leigh Halfpenny taking Watkin's place on the bench.

=== Japan vs South Africa ===
20 October 2019
19:15 JST (UTC+09)

Japan	3–26	South Africa
Pen: Tamura (1/1) 20'	Report	Try: Mapimpi (2) 4' m, 70' m de Klerk 66' c Con: Pollard (1/3) 66'; Pen: Pollard (3/4) 44', 49', 64'

Tokyo Stadium, Chōfu
Attendance: 48,831
Referee: Wayne Barnes (England)

Japan	South Africa

FB	15	Ryohei Yamanaka	(substituted off) 60'
RW	14	Kotaro Matsushima
OC	13	Timothy Lafaele
IC	12	Ryoto Nakamura
LW	11	Kenki Fukuoka
FH	10	Yu Tamura	(substituted off) 48'
SH	9	Yutaka Nagare	(substituted off) 72'
N8	8	Kazuki Himeno			(substituted off) 52'
OF	7	Lappies Labuschagné	(substituted off) 13'	(substituted in) 22'
BF	6	Michael Leitch (c)
RL	5	James Moore
LL	4	Luke Thompson	(substituted off) 54'
TP	3	Koo Ji-won	(substituted off) 64'
HK	2	Shota Horie	(substituted off) 72'
LP	1	Keita Inagaki	(substituted off) 48'	(substituted in) 68'
Replacements:
HK	16	Atsushi Sakate	(substituted in) 72'
PR	17	Isileli Nakajima	(substituted in) 48'	(substituted off) 68'
PR	18	Asaeli Ai Valu	(substituted in) 64'
LK	19	Wimpie van der Walt	(substituted in) 54'
N8	20	Amanaki Mafi	(substituted in) 13'	(substituted off) 22'	(substituted in) 52'
SH	21	Fumiaki Tanaka	(substituted in) 72'
FH	22	Rikiya Matsuda	(substituted in) 48'
WG	23	Lomano Lemeki	(substituted in) 60'
Coach:
(New Zealand) Jamie Joseph

FB	15	Willie le Roux
RW	14	Cheslin Kolbe		(substituted off) 72'
OC	13	Lukhanyo Am
IC	12	Damian de Allende
LW	11	Makazole Mapimpi
FH	10	Handré Pollard
SH	9	Faf de Klerk		(substituted off) 74'
N8	8	Duane Vermeulen		(substituted off) 68'
BF	7	Pieter-Steph du Toit
OF	6	Siya Kolisi (c)		(substituted off) 13'	(substituted in) 21'
RL	5	Lood de Jager		(substituted off) 67'
LL	4	Eben Etzebeth		(substituted off) 63'
TP	3	Frans Malherbe		(substituted off) 54'
HK	2	Bongi Mbonambi		(substituted off) 37'
LP	1	Tendai Mtawarira	(yellow card) 10'			(substituted off) 54'
Replacements:
HK	16	Malcolm Marx		(substituted in) 37'
PR	17	Steven Kitshoff		(substituted in) 13'	(substituted off) 21'	(substituted in) 54'
PR	18	Vincent Koch		(substituted in) 54'
LK	19	RG Snyman		(substituted in) 63'
LK	20	Franco Mostert		(substituted in) 67'
FL	21	Francois Louw		(substituted in) 68'
SH	22	Herschel Jantjies		(substituted in) 74'
CE	23	François Steyn		(substituted in) 72'
Coach:
(South Africa) Rassie Erasmus

Player of the Match:
Faf de Klerk (South Africa)

Assistant referees:
Ben O'Keeffe (New Zealand)
Luke Pearce (England)
Television match official:
Rowan Kitt (England)

== Semi-finals ==
=== England vs New Zealand ===
26 October 2019
17:00 JST (UTC+09)

England	19–7	New Zealand
Try: Tuilagi 2' c Con: Farrell (1/1) 3'; Pen: Ford (4/5) 40', 50', 63', 69'	Report	Try: Savea 57' c Con: Mo'unga (1/1) 58'

International Stadium Yokohama, Yokohama
Attendance: 68,843
Referee: Nigel Owens (Wales)

England	New Zealand

FB	15	Elliot Daly
RW	14	Anthony Watson
OC	13	Manu Tuilagi	(substituted off) 74'
IC	12	Owen Farrell (c)
LW	11	Jonny May	(substituted off) 45'
FH	10	George Ford
SH	9	Ben Youngs	(substituted off) 63'
N8	8	Billy Vunipola
OF	7	Sam Underhill	(substituted off) 70'
BF	6	Tom Curry
RL	5	Courtney Lawes	(substituted off) 55'
LL	4	Maro Itoje
TP	3	Kyle Sinckler	(substituted off) 47'
HK	2	Jamie George	(substituted off) 70'
LP	1	Mako Vunipola	(substituted off) 70'
Replacements:
HK	16	Luke Cowan-Dickie	(substituted in) 70'
PR	17	Joe Marler	(substituted in) 70'
PR	18	Dan Cole	(substituted in) 47'
LK	19	George Kruis	(substituted in) 55'
FL	20	Mark Wilson	(substituted in) 70'
SH	21	Willi Heinz	(substituted in) 63'
CE	22	Henry Slade	(substituted in) 45'
CE	23	Jonathan Joseph	(substituted in) 74'
Coach:
(Australia) Eddie Jones

FB	15	Beauden Barrett
RW	14	Sevu Reece
OC	13	Jack Goodhue	(substituted off) 54'
IC	12	Anton Lienert-Brown
LW	11	George Bridge	(substituted off) 50'
FH	10	Richie Mo'unga
SH	9	Aaron Smith	(substituted off) 54'
N8	8	Kieran Read (c)
OF	7	Ardie Savea
BF	6	Scott Barrett	(substituted off) 40'
RL	5	Sam Whitelock	(substituted off) 67'
LL	4	Brodie Retallick
TP	3	Nepo Laulala	(substituted off) 54'
HK	2	Codie Taylor	(substituted off) 49'
LP	1	Joe Moody	(substituted off) 63'
Replacements:
HK	16	Dane Coles	(substituted in) 50'
PR	17	Ofa Tu'ungafasi	(substituted in) 63'
PR	18	Angus Ta'avao	(substituted in) 54'
LK	19	Patrick Tuipulotu	(substituted in) 66'
FL	20	Sam Cane	(substituted in) 40'
SH	21	TJ Perenara	(substituted in) 54'
CE	22	Sonny Bill Williams	(substituted in) 54'
FB	23	Jordie Barrett	(substituted in) 50'
Coach:
(New Zealand) Steve Hansen

Player of the Match:
Maro Itoje (England)

Assistant referees:
Romain Poite (France)
Pascal Gaüzère (France)
Television match official:
Marius Jonker (South Africa)

Notes:

- Billy Vunipola (England) and Codie Taylor (New Zealand) earned their 50th test caps.
- This was New Zealand's first Rugby World Cup loss since losing to France 20–18 in the 2007 Rugby World Cup quarter-final.
- This was England's first win over New Zealand in a Rugby World Cup match, their first win since defeating them 38–21 in 2012, and their first win away from Twickenham since a 15−13 win in Wellington in 2003.
- New Zealand failed to score in the first half of a World Cup match for the first time since their 16–6 defeat to Australia in the 1991 World Cup semi-final, and for the first time in any match since England beat them 38–21 in December 2012.
- Measured by points deficit, this result equaled New Zealand's biggest ever World Cup defeat, matching the 12-point losses to France in the 1999 World Cup semi-final (43–31) and to Australia in the 2003 World Cup semi-final (22–10).
- This victory meant England climbed to the top of the World Rugby rankings for the first time since 2004. It also meant New Zealand dropped to third, equalling their lowest position since the rankings were introduced.

=== Wales vs South Africa ===
27 October 2019
18:00 JST (UTC+09)

Wales	16–19	South Africa
Try: Adams 65' c Con: Halfpenny (1/1) 66'; Pen: Biggar (3/3) 18', 39', 46'	Report	Try: de Allende 57' c Con: Pollard (1/1) 58'; Pen: Pollard (4/4) 15', 20', 35', 76'

International Stadium Yokohama, Yokohama
Attendance: 67,750
Referee: Jérôme Garcès (France)

Wales	South Africa

FB	15	Leigh Halfpenny
RW	14	George North	(substituted off) 40'
OC	13	Jonathan Davies
IC	12	Hadleigh Parkes
LW	11	Josh Adams
FH	10	Dan Biggar	(substituted off) 58'
SH	9	Gareth Davies	(substituted off) 48'
N8	8	Ross Moriarty
OF	7	Justin Tipuric
BF	6	Aaron Wainwright	(substituted off) 69'
RL	5	Alun Wyn Jones (c)
LL	4	Jake Ball	(substituted off) 60'
TP	3	Tomas Francis	(substituted off) 36'
HK	2	Ken Owens	(substituted off) 73'
LP	1	Wyn Jones	(substituted off) 55'
Replacements:
HK	16	Elliot Dee	(substituted in) 73'
PR	17	Rhys Carré	(substituted in) 55'
PR	18	Dillon Lewis	(substituted in) 36'
LK	19	Adam Beard	(substituted in) 60'
FL	20	Aaron Shingler	(substituted in) 69'
SH	21	Tomos Williams	(substituted in) 48'
FH	22	Rhys Patchell	(substituted in) 58'
CE	23	Owen Watkin	(substituted in) 40'
Coach:
(New Zealand) Warren Gatland

FB	15	Willie le Roux	(substituted off) 69'
RW	14	S'busiso Nkosi
OC	13	Lukhanyo Am
IC	12	Damian de Allende
LW	11	Makazole Mapimpi
FH	10	Handré Pollard
SH	9	Faf de Klerk
N8	8	Duane Vermeulen
BF	7	Pieter-Steph du Toit
OF	6	Siya Kolisi (c)	(substituted off) 69'
RL	5	Lood de Jager	(substituted off) 58'
LL	4	Eben Etzebeth	(substituted off) 53'
TP	3	Frans Malherbe	(substituted off) 48'
HK	2	Bongi Mbonambi	(substituted off) 48'
LP	1	Tendai Mtawarira	(substituted off) 48'
Replacements:
HK	16	Malcolm Marx	(substituted in) 48'
PR	17	Steven Kitshoff	(substituted in) 48'
PR	18	Vincent Koch	(substituted in) 48'
LK	19	RG Snyman	(substituted in) 53'
LK	20	Franco Mostert	(substituted in) 58'
FL	21	Francois Louw	(substituted in) 69'
SH	22	Herschel Jantjies
CE	23	François Steyn	(substituted in) 69'
Coach:
(South Africa) Rassie Erasmus

Player of the Match:
Handré Pollard (South Africa)

Assistant referees:
Wayne Barnes (England)
Ben O'Keeffe (New Zealand)
Television match official:
Ben Skeen (New Zealand)

Notes:

- Gareth Davies (Wales) earned his 50th test cap.

== Bronze final: New Zealand vs Wales ==
1 November 2019
18:00 JST (UTC+09)

New Zealand	40–17	Wales
Try: Moody 5' c B. Barrett 13' c B. Smith (2) 33' c, 40+1' c Crotty 42' c Mo'unga 76' m Con: Mo'unga (5/6) 7', 14', 34', 40+2', 44'	Report	Try: Amos 19' c Adams 59' c Con: Patchell (1/1) 21'; Biggar (1/1) 61'; Pen: Patchell (1/1) 27'

Tokyo Stadium, Chōfu
Attendance: 48,842
Referee: Wayne Barnes (England)

New Zealand	Wales

FB	15	Beauden Barrett
RW	14	Ben Smith
OC	13	Ryan Crotty	(substituted off) 57'
IC	12	Sonny Bill Williams	(substituted off) 57'
LW	11	Rieko Ioane
FH	10	Richie Mo'unga
SH	9	Aaron Smith	(substituted off) 57'
N8	8	Kieran Read (c)
OF	7	Sam Cane
BF	6	Shannon Frizell	(substituted off) 61'
RL	5	Scott Barrett	(substituted off) 61'
LL	4	Brodie Retallick
TP	3	Nepo Laulala	(substituted off) 57'
HK	2	Dane Coles	(substituted off) 25'
LP	1	Joe Moody	(substituted off) 57'
Replacements:
HK	16	Liam Coltman	(substituted in) 25'
PR	17	Atunaisa Moli	(substituted in) 57'
PR	18	Angus Ta'avao	(substituted in) 57'
LK	19	Patrick Tuipulotu	(substituted in) 61'
FL	20	Matt Todd	(substituted in) 61'
SH	21	Brad Weber	(substituted in) 57'
CE	22	Anton Lienert-Brown	(substituted in) 61'
FB	23	Jordie Barrett	(substituted in) 57'
Coach:
(New Zealand) Steve Hansen

FB	15	Hallam Amos
RW	14	Owen Lane
OC	13	Jonathan Davies
IC	12	Owen Watkin	(substituted off) 62'
LW	11	Josh Adams
FH	10	Rhys Patchell	(substituted off) 47'
SH	9	Tomos Williams	(substituted off) 47'
N8	8	Ross Moriarty	(substituted off) 47'
OF	7	James Davies
BF	6	Justin Tipuric
RL	5	Alun Wyn Jones (c)	(substituted off) 57'
LL	4	Adam Beard
TP	3	Dillon Lewis	(substituted off) 78'
HK	2	Ken Owens	(substituted off) 44'
LP	1	Nicky Smith	(substituted off) 44'
Replacements:
HK	16	Elliot Dee	(substituted in) 44'
PR	17	Rhys Carré	(substituted in) 44'
PR	18	Wyn Jones	(substituted in) 78'
LK	19	Jake Ball	(substituted in) 57'
FL	20	Aaron Shingler	(substituted in) 47'
SH	21	Gareth Davies	(substituted in) 47'
FH	22	Dan Biggar	(substituted in) 47'
CE	23	Hadleigh Parkes	(substituted in) 62'
Coach:
(New Zealand) Warren Gatland

Player of the Match:
Brodie Retallick (New Zealand)

Assistant referees:
Jaco Peyper (South Africa)
Pascal Gaüzère (France)
Television match official:
Marius Jonker (South Africa)

== Final: England vs South Africa ==
2 November 2019
18:00 JST (UTC+09)

England	12–32	South Africa
Pen: Farrell (4/5) 23', 35', 52', 60'	Report	Try: Mapimpi 66' c Kolbe 74' c Con: Pollard (2/2) 67', 75'; Pen: Pollard (6/8) 10', 26', 39', 43', 46', 58'

International Stadium Yokohama, Yokohama
Attendance: 70,103
Referee: Jérôme Garcès (France)

England	South Africa

FB	15	Elliot Daly
RW	14	Anthony Watson
OC	13	Manu Tuilagi
IC	12	Owen Farrell (c)
LW	11	Jonny May	(substituted off) 69'
FH	10	George Ford	(substituted off) 49'
SH	9	Ben Youngs	(substituted off) 75'
N8	8	Billy Vunipola
OF	7	Sam Underhill	(substituted off) 59'
BF	6	Tom Curry
RL	5	Courtney Lawes	(substituted off) 40'
LL	4	Maro Itoje
TP	3	Kyle Sinckler	(substituted off) 2'
HK	2	Jamie George	(substituted off) 59'
LP	1	Mako Vunipola	(substituted off) 45'
Replacements:
HK	16	Luke Cowan-Dickie	(substituted in) 59'
PR	17	Joe Marler	(substituted in) 45'
PR	18	Dan Cole	(substituted in) 2'
LK	19	George Kruis	(substituted in) 40'
FL	20	Mark Wilson	(substituted in) 59'
SH	21	Ben Spencer	(substituted in) 75'
CE	22	Henry Slade	(substituted in) 49'
CE	23	Jonathan Joseph	(substituted in) 69'
Coach:
(Australia) Eddie Jones

FB	15	Willie le Roux	(substituted off) 67'
RW	14	Cheslin Kolbe
OC	13	Lukhanyo Am
IC	12	Damian de Allende
LW	11	Makazole Mapimpi
FH	10	Handré Pollard
SH	9	Faf de Klerk	(substituted off) 76'
N8	8	Duane Vermeulen
BF	7	Pieter-Steph du Toit
OF	6	Siya Kolisi (c)	(substituted off) 63'
RL	5	Lood de Jager	(substituted off) 21'
LL	4	Eben Etzebeth	(substituted off) 59'
TP	3	Frans Malherbe	(substituted off) 43'
HK	2	Bongi Mbonambi	(substituted off) 21'
LP	1	Tendai Mtawarira	(substituted off) 43'
Replacements:
HK	16	Malcolm Marx	(substituted in) 21'
PR	17	Steven Kitshoff	(substituted in) 43'
PR	18	Vincent Koch	(substituted in) 43'
LK	19	RG Snyman	(substituted in) 59'
LK	20	Franco Mostert	(substituted in) 21'
FL	21	Francois Louw	(substituted in) 63'
SH	22	Herschel Jantjies	(substituted in) 76'
CE	23	François Steyn	(substituted in) 67'
Coach:
(South Africa) Rassie Erasmus

Player of the Match:
Duane Vermeulen (South Africa)

Assistant referees:
Romain Poite (France)
Ben O'Keeffe (New Zealand)
Television match official:
Ben Skeen (New Zealand)

Notes:

- Siya Kolisi (South Africa) earned his 50th test cap.
- François Steyn (South Africa) became the second Springbok player to win two World Cups.
- Jérôme Garcès became the first French referee to take charge of a Rugby World Cup final.
- South Africa became the first Southern Hemisphere team to win The Rugby Championship (previously the Tri Nations) and the Rugby World Cup in the same year.
- South Africa became the first team to win the Rugby World Cup having lost a match during the pool stage.
- This was the first final in which South Africa scored a try, and the one in which they scored the most points, more than they had in their previous two finals combined. It was also the most points England had scored in a final when finishing on the losing side.
- England and South Africa became the third pair of nations to face each other on two separate occasions in a World Cup final (previously having contested the 2007 final) after England and Australia (1991 and 2003) and France and New Zealand (1987 and 2011).
- South Africa came into the match as the only nation to have contested at least one World Cup final to have never lost in the final - this remains the case.
