= Stanislav Sel'skiy =

Russian rugby union player

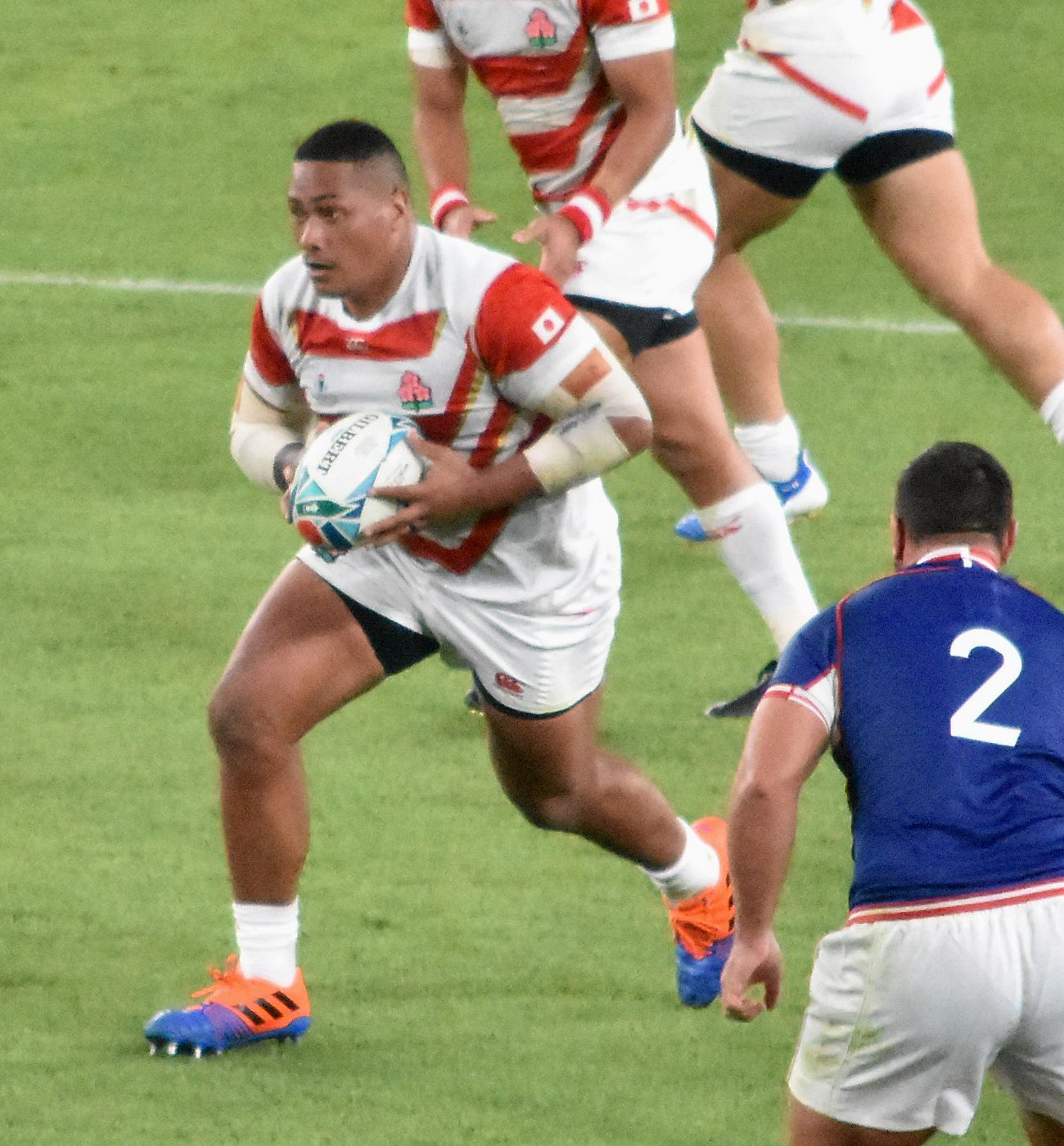
- Stanislav Sel'skiy (number 2) and Asaeli Ai Valu in action during the 2019 Rugby World Cup
- Born: 2 September 1991 (age 35) Novokuznetsk
- Height: 1.80 m (5 ft 11 in)
- Weight: 105 kg (16 st 7 lb; 231 lb)

Rugby union career
- Position: Hooker
- Current team: Enisey-STM
Senior career
Years	Team	Apps	(Points)
2007-2010	Slava Moscow		
2011-present	Enisey-STM		
- Correct as of 14 September 2019
International career
Years	Team	Apps	(Points)
2012–present	Russia	43	(30)
- Correct as of 8 August 2021

Stanislav Sel'skiy (born 2 September 1991) is a Russian rugby union player who generally plays as a hooker represents Russia internationally.

== Career ==
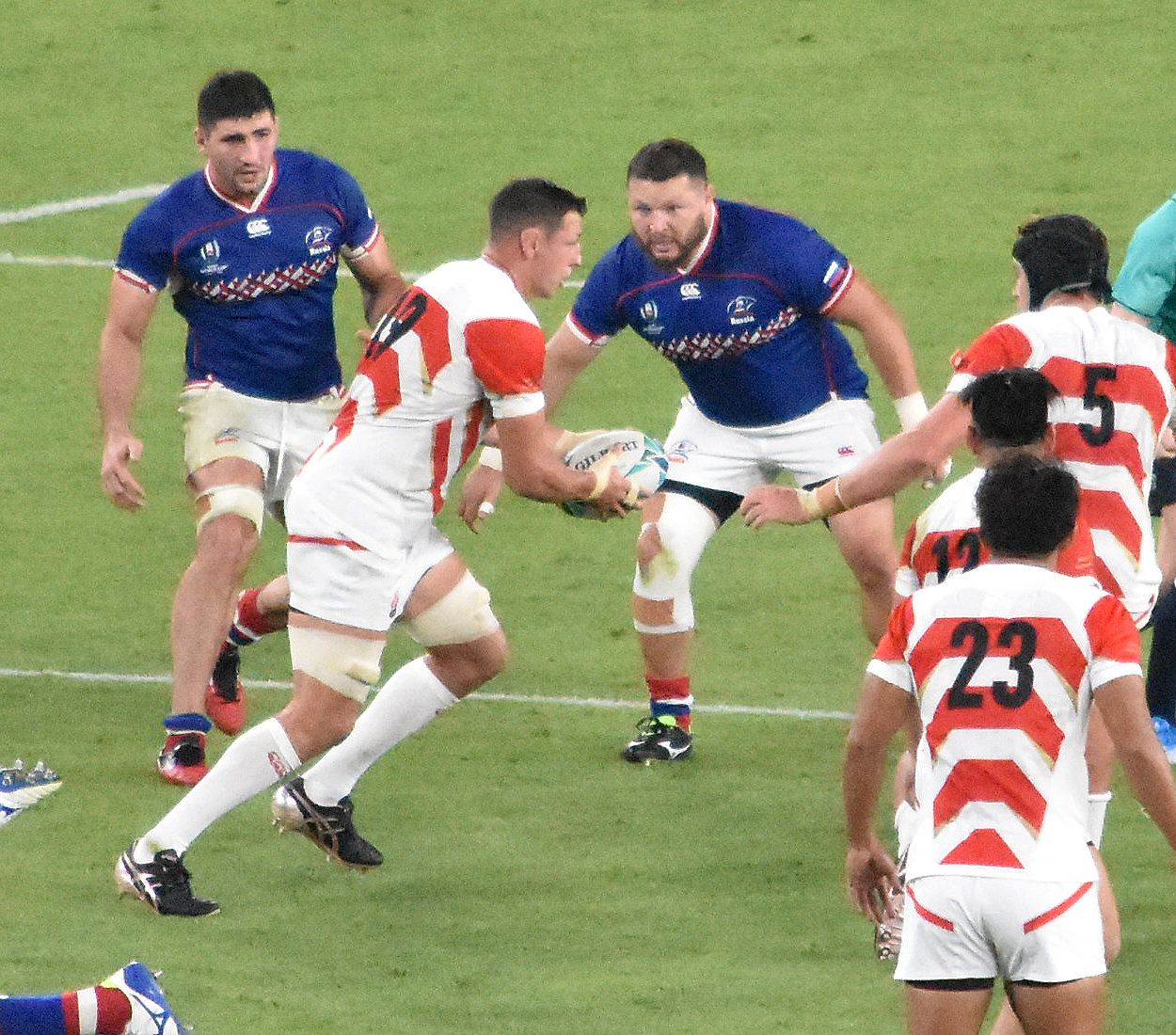
Tagir Gadzhiev (left) and Azamat Bitiyev (center) at KM-2019

In the European Rugby Challenge Cup he has 5 tries in 24 matches for Enisey-STM. Stanislav made his international debut for Russia against Emerging Italy on 8 June 2012.

He featured in a PRL All-Star Game in 2013 and the match was held as part of the celebration of the 90th anniversary of rugby in Russia. He was included in the Russian squad for the 2019 Rugby World Cup which was held in Japan for the first time and also marked his first World Cup appearance.

He was also part of the national side which participated at the 2020 Rugby Europe Championship and 2021 Rugby Europe Championship.

Honours

- Russian Championships (7): 2011, 2012, 2014, 2016, 2017, 2018, 2019
- Russian Cup (3): 2014, 2016, 2017
- Russian Supercup (3): 2014, 2015, 2017
- European Rugby Continental Shield (2): 2016-17, 2017–18
