= Azamat Bitiev =

Russian rugby union player

- Born: 2 September 1991 (age 35)
- Height: 1.82 m (5 ft 11 1/2 in)
- Weight: 108 kg (17 st 0 lb; 238 lb)

Rugby union career
- Position: Prop
- Current team: Enisey-STM
Senior career
Years	Team	Apps	(Points)
2013-2019	Krasny Yar		
2020-present	Enisey-STM	48	(10)
- Correct as of 22 October 2022
International career
Years	Team	Apps	(Points)
2015–present	Russia	24	(0)
- Correct as of 18 May 2021

Azamat Bitiev (born 9 December 1989) is a Russian rugby union player who generally plays as a prop represented Russia internationally.

He was included in the Russian squad for the 2019 Rugby World Cup which is scheduled to be held in Japan for the first time and also marks his first World Cup appearance.

== Career ==
He made his international debut for Russia against Zimbabwe on 17 November 2015.

Honours

- Russian Championships (3): 2015, 2020-21, 2021-22
- Russian Cup (6): 2015, 2018, 2019, 2020, 2021, 2022
