= Dmitry Perov =

Russian rugby union player

- Born: 18 November 1984 (age 41)
- Height: 175 cm (5 ft 9 in)
- Weight: 75 kg (165 lb)

Rugby union career
- Position: Scrum-half
- Current team: VVA-Podmoskovye
Senior career
Years	Team	Apps	(Points)
- VVA-Podmoskovye
- Correct as of 14 September 2019
International career
Years	Team	Apps	(Points)
2018–present	Russia	10	(0)
- Correct as of 14 September 2019

Dmitry Perov also spelled as Dimitri Perov (born 18 November 1984) is a Russian rugby union player who generally plays as a scrum half represents Russia internationally.

He was included in the Russian squad for the 2019 Rugby World Cup which is scheduled to be held in Japan for the first time and also marks his first World Cup appearance.

== Career ==
He made his international debut for Russia against Namibia on 10 November 2018.
