= Anton Sychev =

Russian rugby union player

- Born: 5 February 1994 (age 32)
- Height: 182 cm (6 ft 0 in)
- Weight: 98 kg (216 lb)

Rugby union career
- Position: Back row
- Current team: Metallurg
Senior career
| Years | Team | Apps | (Points) |
- Metallurg
- Correct as of 14 September 2019
International career
| Years | Team | Apps | (Points) |
| 2015–present | Russia | 14 | (20) |
- Correct as of 14 September 2019

Anton Sychev (born 5 February 1994) is a Russian rugby union player who generally plays as a back row represents Russia internationally.

He was included in the Russian squad for the 2019 Rugby World Cup which is scheduled to be held in Japan for the first time and also marks his first World Cup appearance.

== Career ==
He made his international debut for Russia against Zimbabwe on 17 November 2015.
