= Bogdan Fedotko =

Russian rugby union player

- Born: 22 September 1994 (age 32) Krasnoyarsk
- Height: 2.00 m (6 ft 6 1/2 in)
- Weight: 105 kg (16 st 7 lb; 231 lb)

Rugby union career
- Position: Lock
- Current team: Krasny Yar
Senior career
Years	Team	Apps	(Points)
2012-present	Krasny Yar		
2016	Metallurg		
- Correct as of 14 September 2019
International career
Years	Team	Apps	(Points)
2016–present	Russia	20	(25)
- Correct as of 14 September 2019

Bogdan Fedotko (born 22 September 1994) is a Russian rugby union player who generally plays as a lock represents Russia internationally.

He was included in the Russian squad for the 2019 Rugby World Cup which is scheduled to be held in Japan for the first time and also marks his first World Cup appearance.

== Career ==
He made his international debut for Russia against Zimbabwe on 11 November 2016.
