= Kane Le'aupepe =

Samoan rugby union player

- Born: 3 December 1992 (age 33) Wellington, New Zealand
- Height: 201 cm (6 ft 7 in)
- Weight: 118 kg (260 lb; 18 st 8 lb)
- School: Newlands College

Rugby union career
- Position(s): Lock, Flanker
Senior career
Years	Team	Apps	(Points)
2016	Wellington	1	(0)
2018–2020	Bay of Plenty	15	(15)
2019–2020	Hurricanes	11	(10)
- Correct as of 5 June 2022
International career
Years	Team	Apps	(Points)
2018–2019	Samoa	10	(0)
- Correct as of 5 June 2022

Kane Le'aupepe (born 3 December 1992 in New Zealand) is a former Samoan rugby union player who plays for the Hurricanes in Super Rugby. His playing position is lock. He was named in the Hurricanes squad for week 1 in 2019.

On 23 August 2019, he was named in Samoa's 34-man training squad for the 2019 Rugby World Cup, before being named in the final 31 on 31 August.
