= Andrei Ostrikov =

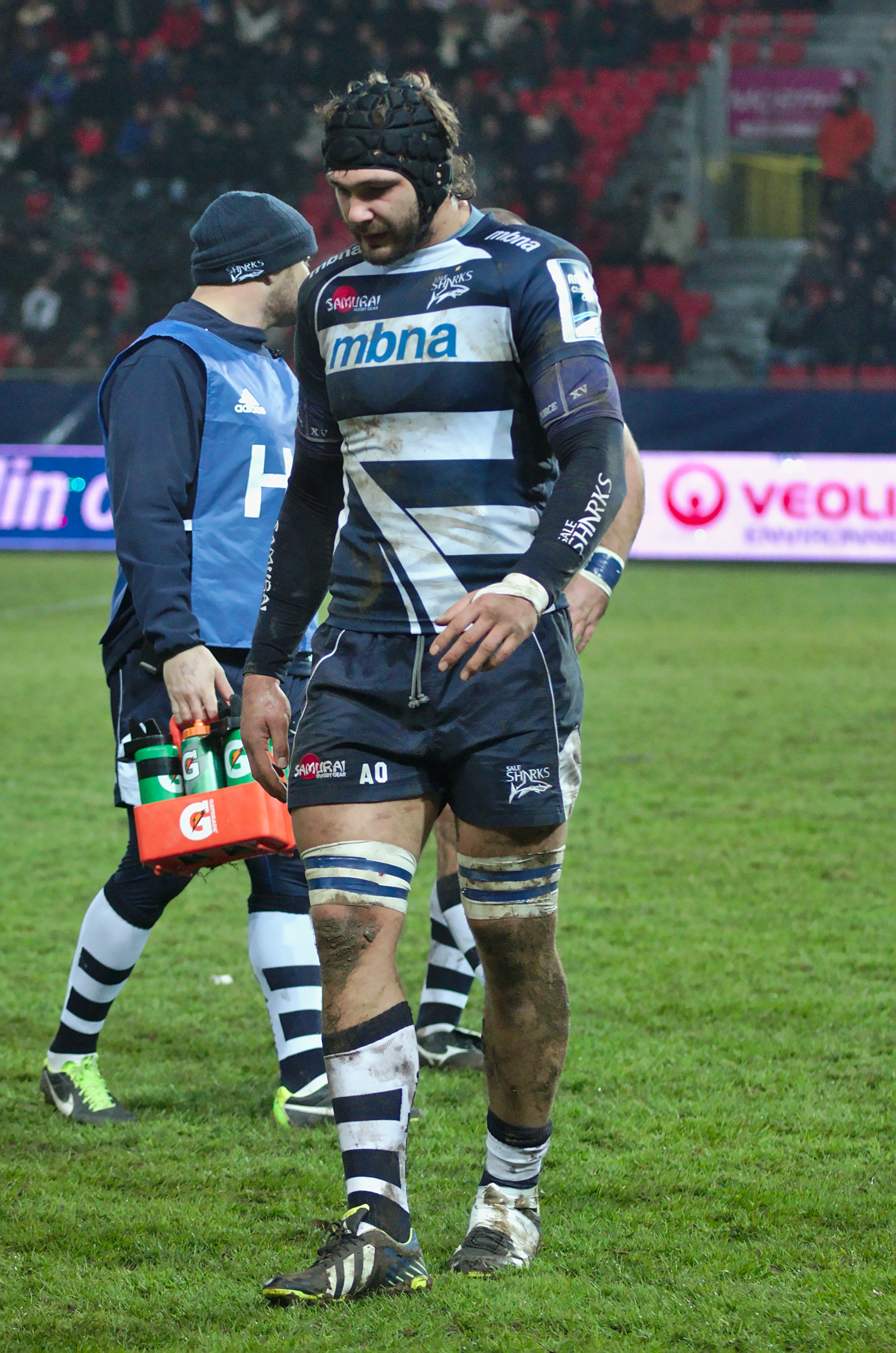
- Born: 2 July 1987 (age 39) Moscow, Russia
- Height: 2.03 m (6 ft 8 in)
- Weight: 121.4 kg (19 st 2 lb)

Rugby union career
- Position(s): Lock, Blindside Flanker
- Current team: Stade Montois
Senior career
Years	Team	Apps	(Points)
2006–2009	SU Agen	12	(5)
2009–2011	Aurillac	40	(0)
2011–2019	Sale Sharks	136	(35)
2019–2021	Grenoble	24	(0)
2021-	Stade Montois	46	(0)
- Correct as of 5 January 2024
International career
Years	Team	Apps	(Points)
2008–2021	Russia	40	(25)
- Correct as of 5 January 2024

Andrei Alexandrovich Ostrikov (Russian: Андрей Александрович Остриков) (born 2 July 1987) is a Russian rugby union player. He played for the Sale Sharks in the Aviva Premiership and is also a regular player for the Russian National Rugby Team. He plays as a lock or a blindside flanker.

== Background ==
Ostrikov was a volleyball player until 15 years old at the Specialized Children and Youth Sports School of the Olympic Reserve N111 in Zelenograd, Russia. After that he decided to try his hand at rugby and joined a rugby school team in Zelenograd. He was a member of the under-19 Junior National Rugby Team.

== Career ==
Club

After the Under-19 Rugby World Cup in Dubai, Ostrikov was noticed by the scouts of a French club SUA (Agen). A couple of months later, in 2006, he signed his first professional contract with the Top14 side SUA (Agen) for three-years. During the next two-years he was a member of the academy squad of SUA (Agen). In 2008, during the third year of his contract, Andrey debuted in a French professional PRO D2. In 2009 Andrey was transferred from Agen to SACA (Aurillac) in the same division PRO D2 where he played for a further two years. Later, Clermont-Auvergne, the French giant of European rugby became interested in Andrey but in 2011, the sports director of an English club Sale Sharks Steve Diamond (a former coach of the Russian National Rugby Team), poached Ostrikov to Northern Powerhouse team, Sale Sharks. During these four years Andrey has received excellent feedback from sports journalists and sport fans. Andrey almost completely missed the season 2012–13 because of a shoulder injury. In 2014–15 he participated in the European Rugby Champions Cup as a Sale Sharks player. In 2015 Ostrikov extended his contract with Sale Sharks for two more years.

National Team

Ostrikov's debut in the National Team took place on 1 March 2008 in Krasnodar where he (20 years old) helped the Russian "Bears" to beat the Portuguese National Rugby Team 41–26. Since that time Andrey has played 40 games for Russia, with 5 tries scored, 25 points on aggregate, and is considered one of the irreplaceable players of the team. He was a member of the Russian National Squad at the 2011 Rugby World Cup, but he never played. He was called once again for the 2019 Rugby World Cup, playing in all four games, but without scoring.
