= Steve Jackson (rugby union) =

New Zealand rugby union footballer and coach

- Born: Steve Jackson; 22 March 1973 (age 53) New Zealand

Rugby union career
- Position: Lock
Provincial / State sides
Years	Team	Apps	(Points)
1998-2003	Southland		
2004	North Harbour		
2008	Tasman		
International career
Years	Team	Apps	(Points)
1991	New Zealand Secondary Schools		
1992	New Zealand Under 19		
2002	Maori All Blacks		
Coaching career
- Years: Team
- 2008: Tasman (Assistant)
- 2010–13: Counties Manukau (forwards)
- 2014–16: North Harbour
- 2014: Blues Under 18
- 2015: Blues Under 20
- 2017-18: Blues (Forwards)
- 2018-20: Samoa
- 2020-: Shimizu Blue Sharks
- Correct as of 8 September 2019

Steve Jackson (born 22 March 1973) is a New Zealand professional rugby union coach, who during his playing career played lock across multiple teams in the New Zealand Provincial Championship. He formerly worked as the head coach of the Samoan National rugby team from 2018 to 2020.

He attended High School at Waitākere College.

== Career ==
=== Playing ===
As a player Steve Jackson, represented NZ Under-17 in 1990, NZ Secondary Schools in 1991, NZ Under-19 in 1992 and toured Australia with the NZ Maoris in 2002.

He enjoyed a long-playing career as a lock playing NPC for North Harbour, Tasman and Captained Southland in 2002–03.

=== Coaching ===
He moved into coaching initially back in his roots in West Auckland with the Massey club which he guided to back-to-back club titles before moving to Nelson where he won a championship with the Marist club.

He then assisted Tasman in the NPC before being recruited by current Georgia Head coach Milton Haig and then Tana Umaga in a successful stint at Counties Manukau, where they were promoted to the NPC Premiership and won the Ranfurly Shield for the first time. After his success with Counties Manukau he was then approached to be Head Coach for North Harbour where he was Head Coach for the 2015 and 2016 where he successfully managed to gain North Harbour promotion to the Premiership.

In 2017 Steve was promoted as the Blues Forwards coach after spending 3 years at the Franchise coaching development teams.
In 2018 Jackson took over as Samoa head coach from previous coach Fuimaono Titimaea Tafua.

Sporting positions
Preceded by (Samoa) Titimaea Tafua	Samoa National Rugby Union Coach; 2018–2020	Succeeded by (Samoa) Seilala Mapusua
