= Kotaro Matsushima =

Japan international rugby union player

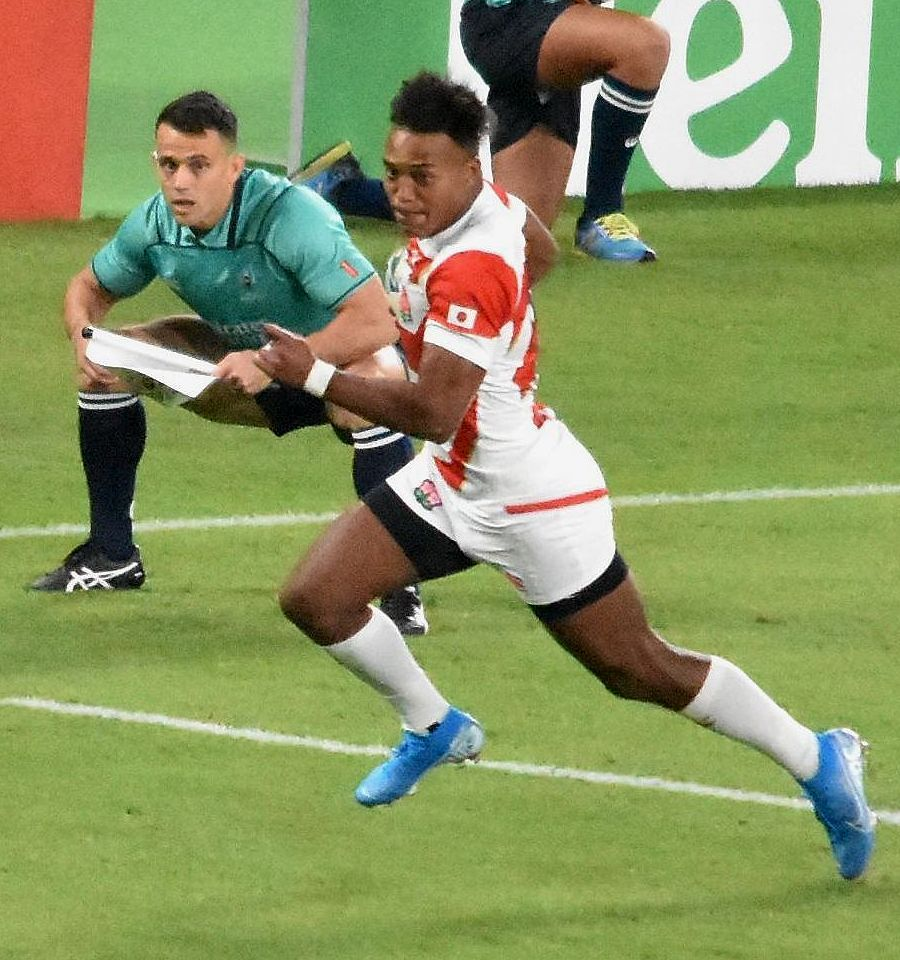
- Matsushima representing Japan during the Rugby World Cup
- Full name: Kotaro Munyaradzi Matsushima
- Born: 26 February 1993 (age 33) Pretoria, South Africa
- Height: 1.78 m (5 ft 10 in)
- Weight: 88 kg (194 lb; 13 st 12 lb)
- School: Graeme College; Tōin Gakuen High School

Rugby union career
- Position(s): Fullback, Wing, Centre
- Current team: Suntory Sungoliath
Senior career
Years	Team	Apps	(Points)
2013	Sharks	2	(5)
2014–2020 2022–	Suntory Sungoliath	127	(225)
2015	Eastern Suburbs	7	(5)
2016	Melbourne Rebels	5	(0)
2017–2018	Sunwolves	14	(7)
2020–2022	Clermont	45	(55)
- Correct as of 28 August 2023
International career
Years	Team	Apps	(Points)
2014–2023	Japan	55	(115)
2023	Japan XV	2	(5)
- Correct as of 28 August 2023

Kotaro Munyaradzi Matsushima (松島 幸太朗, Matsushima Kōtarō; born 26 February 1993) is a professional rugby union player who plays as a fullback for Japan Rugby League One club Tokyo Sungoliath. Born in South Africa, he represents Japan at international level after qualifying on ancestry grounds.

== Early life ==
Matsushima was born in Pretoria, South Africa, to a Japanese mother and a Zimbabwean Shona father. He acquired Japanese nationality at the age of 5 and moved to Japan the following year with his family. After graduating from the local elementary school in Tokyo (where he played soccer), he lived for one year in South Africa and started playing rugby. He finished his junior schooling at Graeme College in Grahamstown, Eastern Cape. He played for the U13a rugby side and won the most outstanding player of the year award. He returned to Japan at the age of 13 and finished his schooling at Tōin Gakuen High School in Yokohama.

== Club career ==
=== Sharks ===
Matsushima returned to South Africa in 2012, enrolling at the Sharks Academy in Durban, becoming the first Japanese player to do so. He played Under-20 club rugby for Harlequins and started twelve matches for the Sharks U19 side in the 2012 Under-19 Provincial Championship, scoring three tries as his side reached the semi-final of the competition, where they lost 46–35 to the Blue Bulls U19 side despite a Matsushima try early in the second half. At the end of 2012, Matsushima was also invited to attend a training camp for the South African Under-20 team in preparation for the 2013 IRB Junior World Championship.

Matsushima made his first class debut for a Sharks XV side during the 2013 Vodacom Cup competition, starting their final round-robin match against Argentine side Pampas XV. He took just three minutes to add his name to the scoresheet by scoring an early try to set the Sharks on their way to a 46–31 victory in the match in Durban. He also played in their quarter-final match against eventual champions Golden Lions, but could not prevent his side suffering a 25–42 loss to be eliminated from the competition. In the latter half of 2013, he featured prominently for the Sharks U21 side in the 2013 Under-21 Provincial Championship, scoring three tries in eleven starts as his side reached the semi-finals of the competition, where they were eliminated by the Blue Bulls U21s.

=== Tokyo Sungoliath ===
Matsushima joined Japanese Top League side Suntory Sungoliath prior to the 2014–15 Top League season. He made his debut for the side in the opening round of the tournament in a 17–13 victory over Coca-Cola Red Sparks. Two more appearances followed in the pool stage of the competition – against Kintetsu Liners and NTT DoCoMo Red Hurricanes – to help his side finish in second position in Pool B to qualify for Group 1, the title play-offs. He started all seven of their matches in Group 1 in the outside centre position and scored four tries – two of those in their final group match against Toyota Verblitz in a 40–19 victory – as they finished fifth in the group to qualify for the wildcard play-offs.

His performances also earned him an inclusion in the Top League Team of the Season.

=== Super Rugby ===
Matsushima joined Australian Super Rugby side the Waratahs prior to the 2015 Super Rugby season.

Matsushima joined Australian Super Rugby side the Rebels on a short-term deal for the 2016 Super Rugby season.

=== Clermont ===
Matsushima joined French Top 14 side ASM Clermont Auvergne following the 2020 Top League season. He made his debut in a 36–27 defeat to Racing 92 in the 2019-20 European Rugby Champions Cup, scoring a try. However, his Top 14 debut against Toulouse ended after 16 minutes because of an injury. His first start since returning from injury saw him score his first two tries in domestic competition, in a 50–29 win over Pau. He made important contributions to Clermont's 2020-21 European Rugby Champions Cup campaign, scoring a hat-trick in a 51–38 away win at Bristol Bears in the pool stage and a decisive late try in the Round of 16 against Wasps. His second season in France was cut short by injury, damaging his shoulder in defeat to Leicester Tigers in April 2022, which would prove to be his final performance for Les Jaunards. His contribution to the team was praised by coach Franck Azéma, who described how Matsushima "has speed, punch, he brings a certain execution in the gesture. He has speed that everyone sees but he has a great knowledge of the fundamentals of the position of full-back or winger. He's comfortable with the ball and that is what you expect from an ASM player." Matsushima spoke highly of how his experience developed his game, saying "I gained a lot of match experience and have become more mentally composed. I've gotten better at making quick decisions."

== International career ==
Matsushima made his international debut for Japan on 3 May 2014 in a 2014 Asian Five Nations match (which doubled as a 2015 Rugby World Cup qualifier) against the Philippines in Manila. He scored tries in the 36th and 71st minutes of the match to help Japan secure a comprehensive 99–10 victory over the hosts. He also played in their next match against Sri Lanka, scoring a try in their 132–10 victory, as well as their next match against South Korea and in test matches against Samoa, Romania and Georgia.

At the 2015 Rugby World Cup, Matsushima started in Japan's 34–32 upset win over South Africa, providing the assist for Ayumu Goromaru's try. He received a yellow card in defeat to Scotland, but scored his first Rugby World Cup try in a 28–18 victory over the USA at Kingsholm.

Matsushima was integral at the 2019 Rugby World Cup as Japan reached the knockout stages for the first time. Matsushima scored Japan's first World Cup hat-trick against Russia on 20 September 2019 in the opening game of the tournament in Tokyo and was also awarded the player of the match in the same match. Against Ireland at Shizuoka Stadium he performed well again, being denied two tries only by an unfavourable bounce of the ball. In their third pool game against Samoa at Toyota Stadium, Matsushima scored with the final play of the game to give the Brave Blossoms a crucial bonus point in a 38–19 victory. In the 28–21 victory over Scotland that qualified Japan for the knockout stage, he scored his side's opening try, before his break helped to set up Keita Inagaki's score. Japan were eliminated by eventual champions South Africa in the quarter-finals, but Matsushima was named in the team of the tournament by ESPN and The Guardian, with honourable mentions from Sky Sports and Rugby365.

== Personal life ==
Matsushima's performances in the Japan team at the 2019 Rugby World Cup made him a star in his country. He is now one of the most influential athletes in Japan, and his spell at ASM Clermont Auvergne in France was considered a sporting and marketing winning affair for the club and the city.

== Career statistics ==
=== Club summary ===
As of 26 July 2016

Season	Team	Games	Starts	Sub	Mins	Tries	Cons	Pens	Drops	Points	Yel	Red
2015	Waratahs	0	0	0	0	0	0	0	0	0	0	0
2016	Rebels	5	0	5	105	0	0	0	0	0	0	0
Total		5	0	5	105	0	0	0	0	0	0	0
