= Sergey Yanyushkin =

Russian rugby union player

- Born: 16 November 1986 (age 39) Penza
- Height: 174 cm (5 ft 9 in)
- Weight: 82 kg (181 lb)

Rugby union career
- Position: Fly half
- Current team: Lokomotiv Penza
Senior career
Years	Team	Apps	(Points)
- Lokomotiv Penza
- Correct as of 14 September 2019
International career
Years	Team	Apps	(Points)
2013–present	Russia	16	(55)
- Correct as of 14 September 2019

Sergey Yanyushkin (born 16 November 1986) is a Russian rugby union player who generally plays as a fly half represents Russia internationally.

He was included in the Russian squad for the 2019 Rugby World Cup which is scheduled to be held in Japan for the first time and also marks his first World Cup appearance.

== Career ==
He made his international debut for Russia against Spain on 2 February 2013.
