= Vasily Dorofeev =

Russian rugby union player

- Born: 6 August 1990 (age 36) Krasnoyarsk
- Height: 175 cm (5 ft 9 in)
- Weight: 82 kg (181 lb)

Rugby union career
- Position: Fullback
- Current team: Krasny Yar
Senior career
Years	Team	Apps	(Points)
- Krasny Yar
- Correct as of 14 September 2019
International career
Years	Team	Apps	(Points)
2014–	Russia	22	(10)
- Correct as of 14 September 2019

Vasily Dorofeev (born 6 August 1990) is a Russian rugby union player who generally plays as a fullback and represents Russia internationally.

He was included in the Russian squad for the 2019 Rugby World Cup which is scheduled to be held in Japan for the first time and also marked his first World Cup appearance.

== Career ==
He made his international debut for Russia against Hong Kong on 8 November 2014.
