= Kirill Gotovtsev =

Russian rugby union player

- Born: 17 July 1987 (age 39) Kimovsk, Tula Oblast, Russian SFSR, Soviet Union
- Height: 1.80 m (5 ft 11 in)
- Weight: 120 kg (18 st 13 lb; 265 lb)

Rugby union career
- Position: Tighthead Prop
- Current team: Gloucester
Senior career
Years	Team	Apps	(Points)
2013-2021	Krasny Yar		
2021–	Gloucester	87	(0)
- Correct as of 4 Mar 2026
International career
Years	Team	Apps	(Points)
2015–2022	Russia	19	(0)
- Correct as of 23 September 2025

Kirill Gotovtsev (born 17 July 1987) is a Russian rugby union player who generally plays as a prop represents Russia internationally. Previously a freestyle wrestler, bronze medallist of the 2010 Russian Championship, as well as an brakeman in bobsleigh.

He made his international debut for Russia against Portugal on 13 November 2015.

He was included in the Russian squad for the 2019 Rugby World Cup which is scheduled to be held in Japan for the first time and also marks his first World Cup appearance.

On 28 April 2021, Kirill would travel to England as he signs for Gloucester in the Premiership Rugby competition ahead of the 2021–22 season.
