= James Moore (rugby union) =

Japan international rugby union player

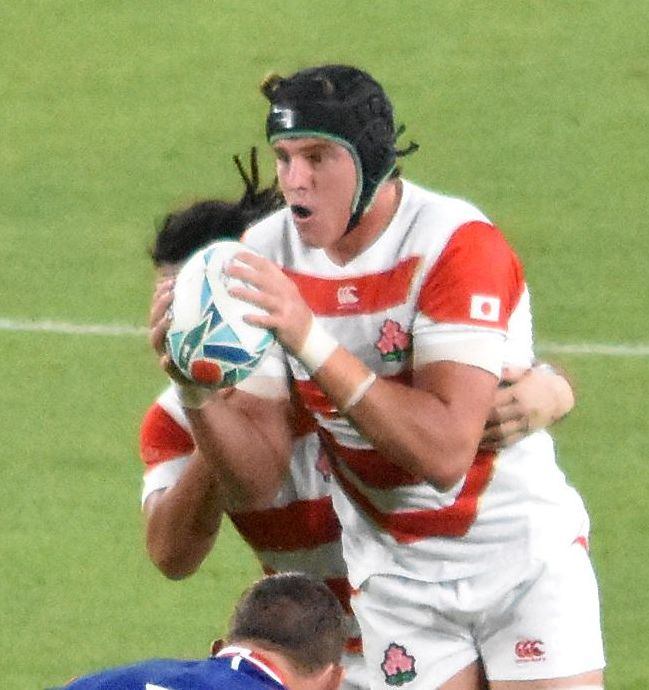
- Moore representing Japan during the Rugby World Cup
- Full name: James William Moore
- Born: 11 June 1993 (age 33) Brisbane, Queensland, Australia
- Height: 1.95 m (6 ft 5 in)
- Weight: 110 kg (243 lb; 17 st 5 lb)
- School: Brisbane State High School

Rugby union career
- Position(s): Lock, Flanker, Number 8
Senior career
Years	Team	Apps	(Points)
2016	Brisbane City	3	(0)
2017	Toshiba Brave Lupus	8	(5)
2018–2019	Sunwolves	15	(0)
2018–2021	Munakata Sanix Blues	20	(5)
2022–2025	Urayasu D-Rocks	25	(5)
- Correct as of 28 August 2023
International career
Years	Team	Apps	(Points)
2019–2023	Japan	16	(0)
2023	Japan XV	2	(0)
- Correct as of 28 August 2023

James William Moore (ジェームス・ムーア, Jēmuzu Mūa; born 11 June 1993) is a professional rugby union player who plays as a lock for Japan Rugby League One club Urayasu D-Rocks. Born in Australia, he represents Japan at international level after qualifying on residency grounds.
