= Koo Ji-won =

Japan international rugby union player

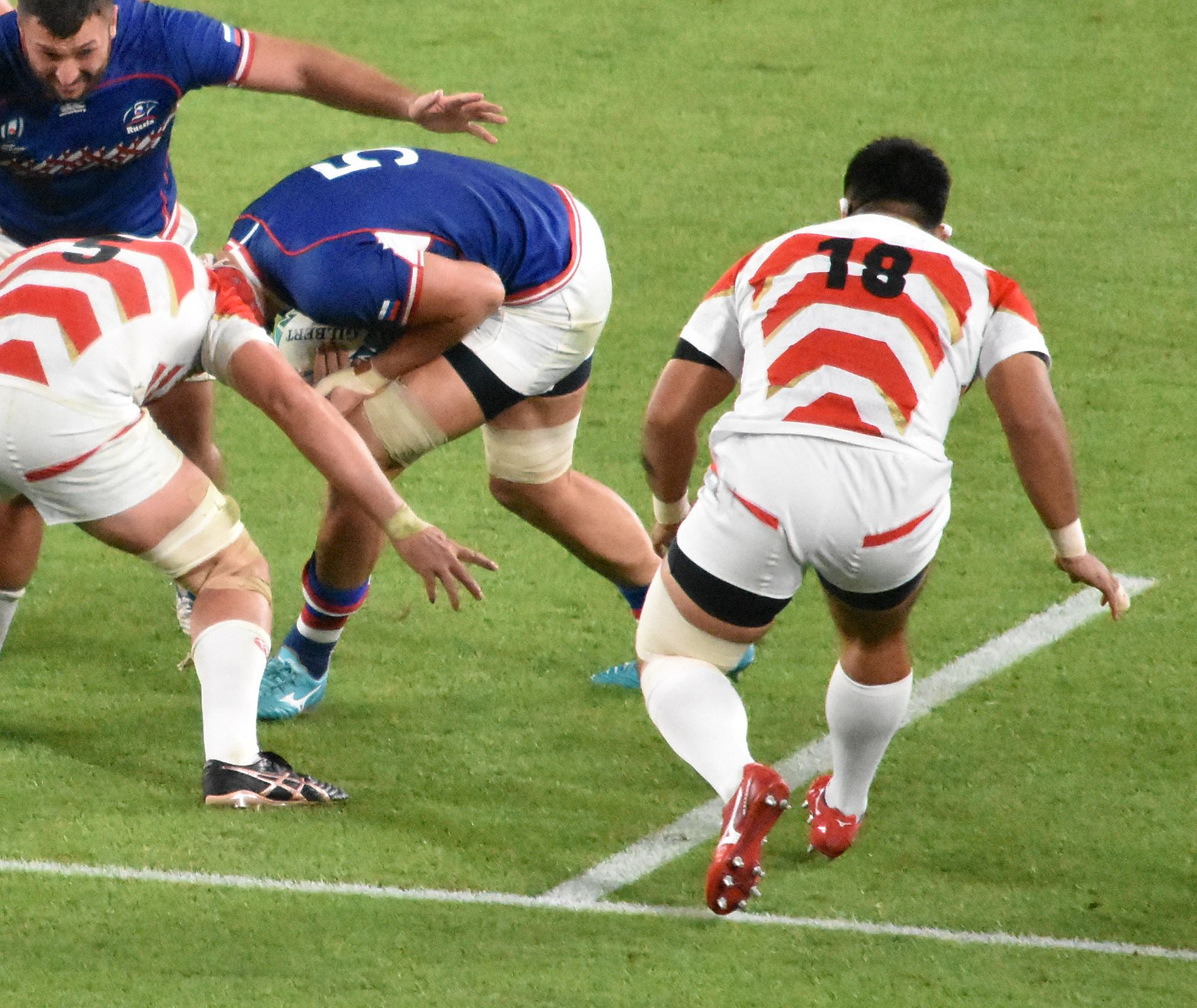
- Born: 20 July 1994 (age 32) Seoul, South Korea
- Height: 1.84 m (6 ft 0 in)
- Weight: 122 kg (269 lb; 19 st 3 lb)

Rugby union career
- Position: Prop
- Current team: Kobelco Steelers
Senior career
Years	Team	Apps	(Points)
2017–2019	Sunwolves	13	(0)
2018–2021	Honda Heat	17	(15)
2022–	Kobelco Steelers	48	(0)
- Correct as of 28 August 2023
International career
Years	Team	Apps	(Points)
2014	Japan U20	4	(0)
2017–	Japan	29	(0)
2023	Japan XV	2	(0)
- Correct as of 28 August 2023

Koo Ji-won (具智元, Gu Jiwon; born 20 July 1994) is a Korean-Japanese professional rugby union player who plays as a prop for Japan Rugby League One club Kobelco Kobe Steelers. Born in South Korea, he represents Japan at international level after qualifying on residency grounds.

He also changed his nationality to Japan after the 2019 World Cup.

== International career ==
After only two Super Rugby appearances for the Sunwolves, which included one start, Koo received his first call-up to his adopted country, Japan's senior squad ahead of the 2017 end-of-year rugby union internationals.
