= Lappies Labuschagné =

Japan international rugby union player

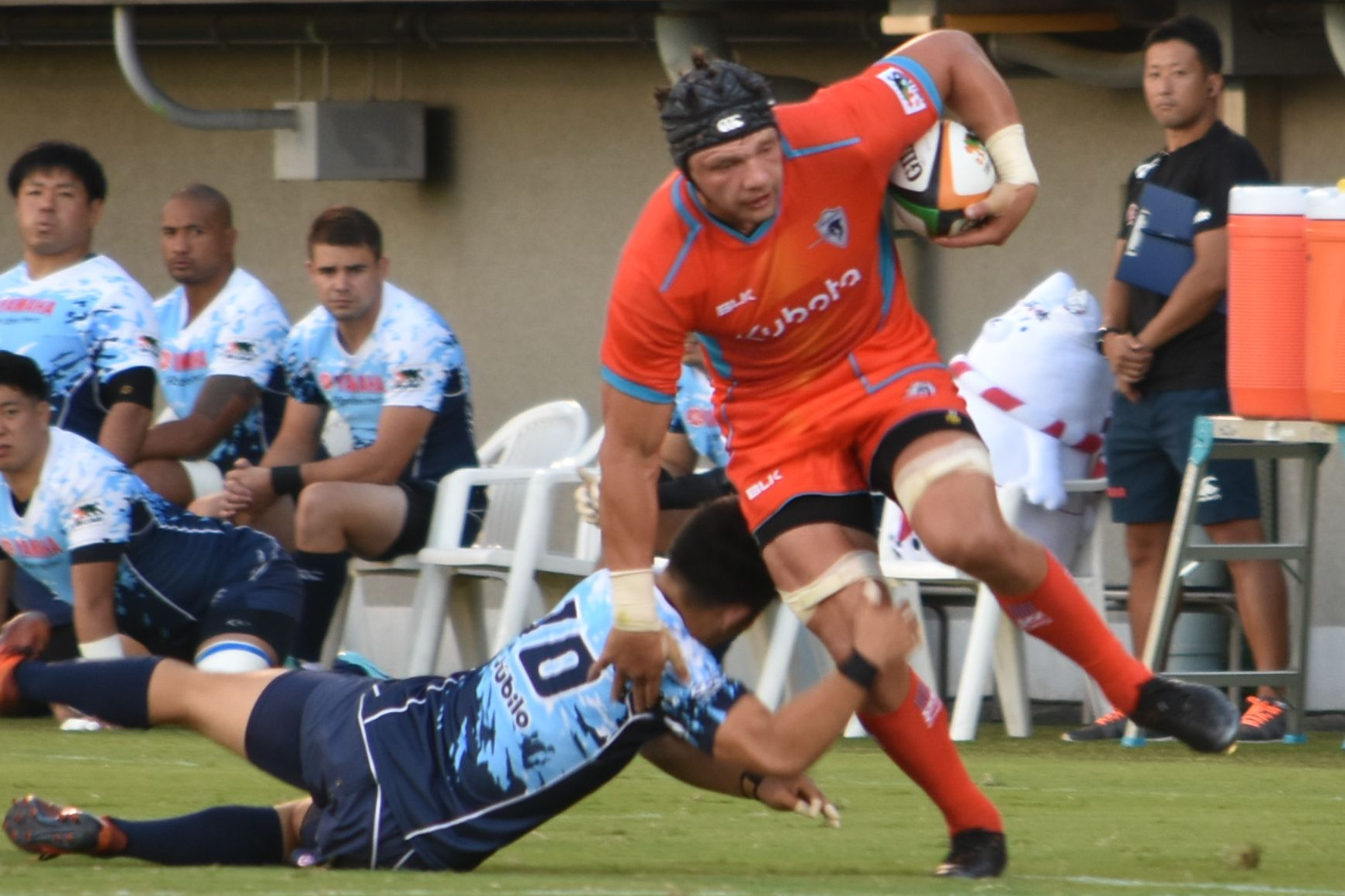
- Labuschagné representing Kubota Spears during the Top League
- Full name: Pieter Hermias Cornelius Labuschagné
- Born: 11 January 1989 (age 37) Pretoria, South Africa
- Height: 1.89 m (6 ft 2 in)
- Weight: 107 kg (236 lb; 16 st 12 lb)
- School: Grey College, Bloemfontein
- University: University of the Free State

Rugby union career
- Position(s): Flanker, Number 8
Senior career
Years	Team	Apps	(Points)
2009–2012	UFS Shimlas	15	(5)
2011–2014	Free State Cheetahs	44	(55)
2011	Emerging Cheetahs	1	(0)
2012	Free State XV	2	(0)
2012–2014	Cheetahs	27	(10)
2015–2016	Bulls	23	(25)
2015–2016	Blue Bulls	11	(10)
2016–2026	Kubota Spears	102	(65)
2018	Sunwolves	7	(5)
- Correct as of 28 August 2023
International career
Years	Team	Apps	(Points)
2019–2023	Japan	19	(5)
- Correct as of 28 August 2023

Pieter Hermias Cornelius Labuschagné (ピーター・ラブスカフニ, Pītā Rabusukafuni; born 11 January 1989) is a professional rugby union player who plays as a flanker for Japan Rugby League One club Kubota Spears. Born in South Africa, he represents Japan at international level after qualifying on residency grounds.

== Club career ==
Labuschagné represented the Bulls in Super Rugby and previously played with the Free State Cheetahs in the Currie Cup. He has also previously captained the UFS Shimlas in the Varsity Cup.

Labuschagné moved to the Japanese Top League prior to the 2016–17 season, signing with the Kubota Spears.

== International career ==
Labuschagné was called up to the South Africa squad for the 2013 mid-year rugby union tests against Italy, Scotland and Samoa, but he did not feature in any of the matches for Springboks.

In 2019, he debuted for Japan. He represented Japan at the 2019 Rugby World Cup and captained them in their Pool A victory over Ireland.
