= Isileli Nakajima =

Japanese rugby union player

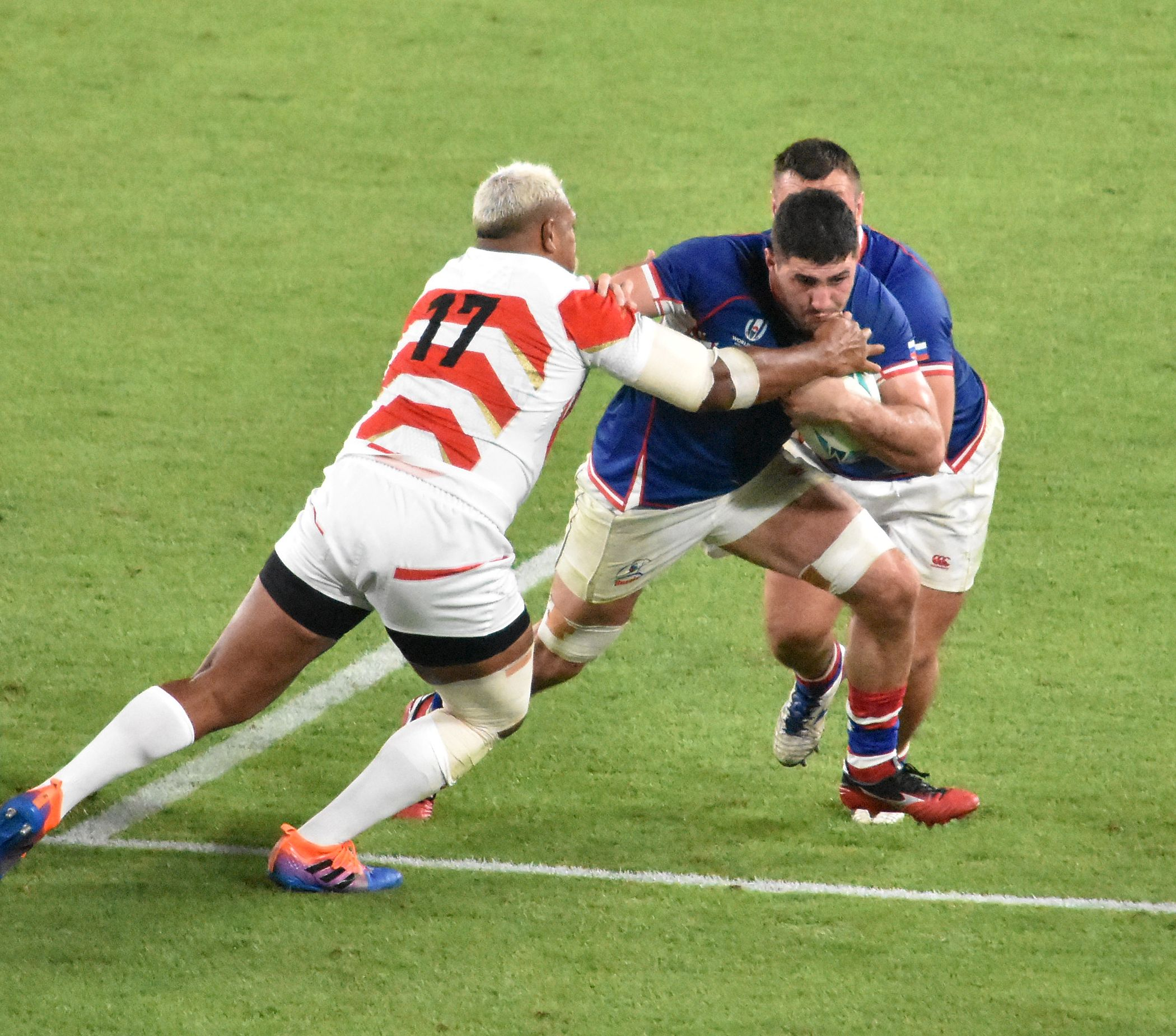
- Isileli Nakajima in action during the Pool A match of the 2019 Rugby World Cup between Japan and Russia
- Full name: Isileli Nakajima Vakauta
- Born: 9 July 1989 (age 37) Vaiola, Tonga
- Height: 1.87 m (6 ft 1 1/2 in)
- Weight: 120 kg (18 st 13 lb; 265 lb)
- University: Ryutsu Keizai University

Rugby union career
- Position(s): prop, lock, number 8
Senior career
Years	Team	Apps	(Points)
2014	NEC Green Rockets	8	(0)
2015–2026	Kobelco Steelers	84	(55)
- Correct as of 02 March 2025
International career
Years	Team	Apps	(Points)
2018–2019	Japan	9	(0)
- Correct as of 21 February 2021

Nakajima Isileli (中島 イシレリ) (born 9 July 1989) is a Tongan-born Japanese rugby union player who generally plays as a prop represents Japan internationally and plays for Kobelco Steelers in the Japanese Top League.

Nakajima made his international debut for Japan against New Zealand on 3 November 2018. He was included in the Japanese squad for the 2019 Rugby World Cup which is currently held in Japan for the first time and for the first time in Asia.

Nakajima was a teenager when he moved to Japan after he was scouted by a Japanese university coach. Nakajima chose to take his wife's surname partly in defiance of the patriarchal norms of his home country but also out of respect and love for his wife and his adopted home.
