= Tagir Gadzhiev =

Russian rugby union player

- Born: 29 March 1994 (age 32) Kizlyar
- Height: 1.88 m (6 ft 2 in)
- Weight: 108 kg (17 st 0 lb; 238 lb)

Rugby union career
- Position: Flanker
- Current team: RC Kuban
Senior career
Years	Team	Apps	(Points)
2013-present	RC Kuban		
2014	VVA Podmoskovye		
2016	Enisey-STM		
- Correct as of 14 September 2019
International career
Years	Team	Apps	(Points)
2015–present	Russia	31	(30)
- Correct as of 10 October 2019

Tagir Gadzhiev also spelled as Tahir Gadziev (born 29 March 1994) is a Dagestani rugby union player who generally plays as a Flanker represents Russia internationally.

He was included in the Russian squad for the 2019 Rugby World Cup which is scheduled to be held in Japan for the first time and also marks his first World Cup appearance.

== Career ==
He made his international debut for Russia against Portugal on 13 November 2015.
