= Keita Inagaki =

Japan international rugby union player

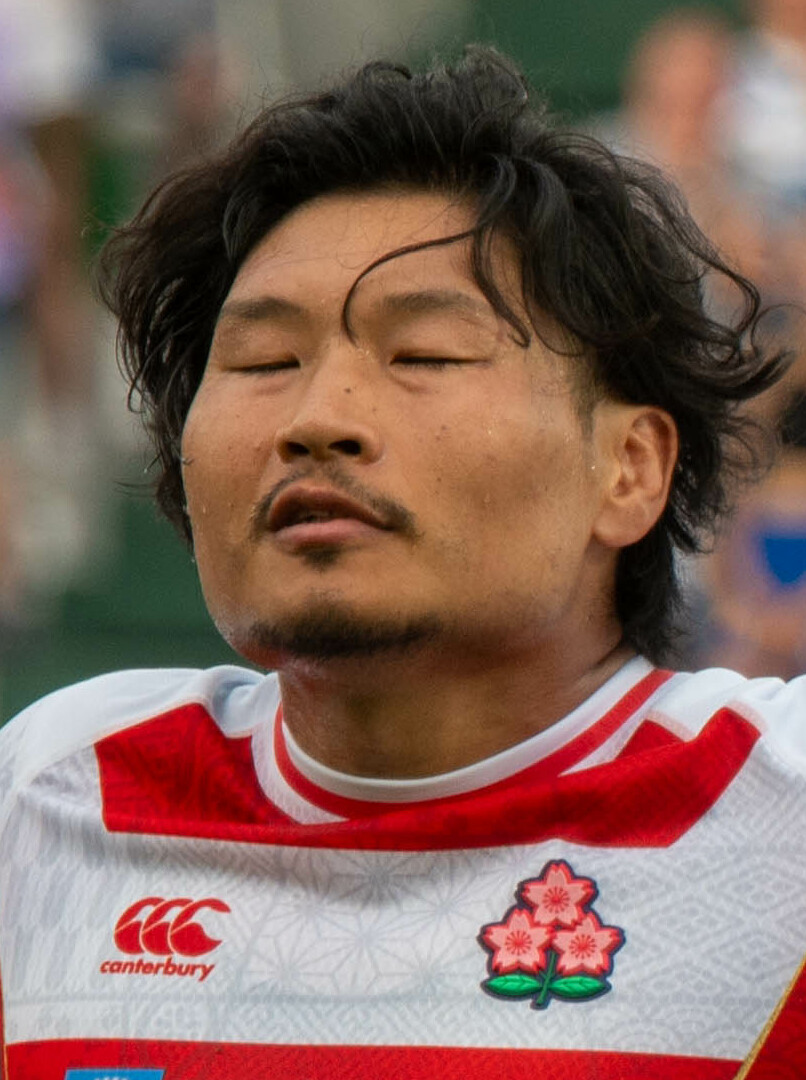
- Inagaki playing at the Summer Nations Series '23 for Japan vs Italy
- Born: 2 June 1990 (age 36) Niigata, Japan
- Height: 1.86 m (6 ft 1 in)
- Weight: 116 kg (256 lb; 18 st 4 lb)
- School: Niigata Technical High School
- University: Kanto Gakuin University

Rugby union career
- Position: Prop
- Current team: Panasonic Wild Knights
Senior career
Years	Team	Apps	(Points)
2013–	Panasonic Wild Knights	163	(15)
2015	Melbourne Rebels	1	(0)
2016–2018	Sunwolves	24	(0)
- Correct as of 28 August 2023
International career
Years	Team	Apps	(Points)
2009	Japan U20	3	(0)
2014–	Japan	53	(5)
2023	Japan XV	1	(0)
- Correct as of 8 October 2023

Keita Inagaki (稲垣 啓太, Inagaki Keita; born 2 June 1990) is a Japanese professional rugby union player who plays as a prop for Japan Rugby League One club Saitama Wild Knights and the Japan national team.

== Club career ==
Inagaki started his professional career with the Panasonic Wild Knights where he lifted the Top League title in each of his first two seasons and was named in the Top League team of the year for 2014–15. Such was his impact in his first two seasons as a professional that when injuries struck the Melbourne Rebels two Japanese players Shota Horie and Male Sa'u, Inagaki was signed up as a concessional signing on a one-year deal ahead of the 2015 Super Rugby season.

== International career ==
Inagaki featured in all four of Japan's games during the 2014 end-of-year rugby union internationals with the first two matches being non-cap internationals against the Māori All Blacks. His official test debut came against Romania in Bucharest on 15 November 2014 and he won his second cap a week later against Georgia in Tbilisi. Inagaki was selected in the Japanese squad for the 2015 Rugby World Cup in England. He played in all five games for Japan which included their big upset over South Africa 34–32 in Brighton. Japan finished the 2015 World Cup with 3 wins out of 4 games but failed to reach the quarterfinals. Inagaki was also selected in Japan's squad for the 2019 Rugby World Cup which was to be held in Japan. Inagaki helped Japan reach their first ever quarterfinals where they went on to lose to eventual winners South Africa 26–3. Inagaki scored a try in Japan's pool match against Scotland which was his first ever test try and also helped push Japan to a 28–21 win.
