= List of Russia national rugby union players =

List of Russia national rugby union players is a list of people who have played for the Russia national rugby union team since their first international in 1992.

== List ==
No.	Name	Position	Debut date	Debut opponent
1	Sergey Boldakov	Flyhalf	11 Oct 1992	v Belgium at Brussels
2	Sergey Borisov	Prop	11 Oct 1992	v Belgium at Brussels
3	Alexandr Bychkov	Scrum-half	11 Oct 1992	v Belgium at Brussels
4	Alexandr Chebotaryov	Lock	11 Oct 1992	v Belgium at Brussels
5	Andrei Emelyanov	Lock	11 Oct 1992	v Belgium at Brussels
6	Vadim Kazydub	Prop	11 Oct 1992	v Belgium at Brussels
7	Evgeni Kosolapov	Flanker	11 Oct 1992	v Belgium at Brussels
8	Viktor Kushnarev	Flanker	11 Oct 1992	v Belgium at Brussels
9	Vladimir Marchenko	Hooker	11 Oct 1992	v Belgium at Brussels
10	Sergey Romanov	Centre	11 Oct 1992	v Belgium at Brussels
11	Andrei Shalyuta	Wing	11 Oct 1992	v Belgium at Brussels
12	Andrei Sorokin	No. 8	11 Oct 1992	v Belgium at Brussels
13	Vitaly Sorokin	Centre	11 Oct 1992	v Belgium at Brussels
14	Alexandr Suhov	Wing	11 Oct 1992	v Belgium at Brussels
15	Vladislav Vorapaev	Fullback	11 Oct 1992	v Belgium at Brussels
16	Pavel Baranovsky	(Prop)	11 Oct 1992	v Belgium at Brussels
17	Igor Frantsuzov	(Scrum-half)	11 Oct 1992	v Belgium at Brussels
18	Sergey Klimenko	Lock	18 Oct 1992	v France XV at Villenueve-sur-Lot
19	Igor Mironov	Flyhalf	18 Oct 1992	v France XV at Villenueve-sur-Lot
20	Alexandr Tikhonov	Flanker	18 Oct 1992	v France XV at Villenueve-sur-Lot
21	Vadim Bogdanov	Lock	24 Oct 1992	v Germany at Losino-Petrovsky
22	Roman Kochetov	Flanker	24 Oct 1992	v Germany at Losino-Petrovsky
23	Aleksei Sergeyev	Centre	24 Oct 1992	v Germany at Losino-Petrovsky
24	Sergey Shirakovski	Prop	24 Oct 1992	v Germany at Losino-Petrovsky
25	Evgeni Valiev	Prop	24 Oct 1992	v Germany at Losino-Petrovsky
26	Alexei Voinov	No. 8	24 Oct 1992	v Germany at Losino-Petrovsky
27	Viktor Yakovlev	Flyhalf	24 Oct 1992	v Germany at Losino-Petrovsky
28	Alexei Zaitzev	Scrum-half	24 Oct 1992	v Germany at Losino-Petrovsky
29	Rashid Bikbov	Prop	15 May 1993	v Morocco at Moscow
30	Andrei Evdokimov	Wing	15 May 1993	v Morocco at Moscow
31	Sergey Kashcheev	Flanker	15 May 1993	v Morocco at Moscow
32	Igor Nikolaychuk	Hooker	15 May 1993	v Morocco at Moscow
33	Oleg Rudenok	Wing	15 May 1993	v Morocco at Moscow
34	O Sergeev	Lock	15 May 1993	v Morocco at Moscow
35	Sergey Starovatov	Scrum-half	15 May 1993	v Morocco at Moscow
36	Nikolai Vasiliev	Lock	15 May 1993	v Morocco at Moscow
37	Alexandr Zakarlyuk	Fullback	15 May 1993	v Morocco at Moscow
38	Vyacheslav Zykov	No. 8	15 May 1993	v Morocco at Moscow
39	Valery Ashurka	Prop	25 May 1993	v Georgia at Sopot
40	Nikolay Kiselyov	Lock	25 May 1993	v Georgia at Sopot
41	Sergey Kryksa	Lock	25 May 1993	v Georgia at Sopot
42	Igor Kuperman	Wing	25 May 1993	v Georgia at Sopot
43	Evgeni Mochnev	Centre	25 May 1993	v Georgia at Sopot
44	Vladimir Negodin	Hooker	25 May 1993	v Georgia at Sopot
45	Andrei Malinin	Lock	29 May 1993	v Poland at Sopot
46	Yuri Nikolayev	(Flyhalf)	29 May 1993	v Poland at Sopot
47	Vyacheslav Bondarev	Centre	6 Nov 1993	v Italy at Moscow
48	Yuri Krasnobaev	Scrum-half	6 Nov 1993	v Italy at Moscow
49	Sergey Perepyolkin	Prop	6 Nov 1993	v Italy at Moscow
50	Andrei Shabolin	Lock	6 Nov 1993	v Italy at Moscow
51	Vyacheslav Grachev	(No. 8)	6 Nov 1993	v Italy at Moscow
52	Igor Khokhlov	(Prop)	19 Mar 1994	v Namibia at Windhoek
53	Dimitri Mananikov	Wing	28 May 1994	v France XV at Moscow
54	Igor Dymchenko	Fullback	24 Sep 1994	v Sweden at Enkoping
55	Alexandr Khrokhin	Flanker	24 Sep 1994	v Sweden at Enkoping
56	Alexei Komarov	Wing	24 Sep 1994	v Sweden at Enkoping
57	Alexandr Krinitsa	Lock	24 Sep 1994	v Sweden at Enkoping
58	Sergey Lysko	Flanker	24 Sep 1994	v Sweden at Enkoping
59	Oleg Shukaylov	No. 8	24 Sep 1994	v Sweden at Enkoping
60	Sergey Zedin	Centre	24 Sep 1994	v Sweden at Enkoping
61	Andrey Zubov	Lock	24 Sep 1994	v Sweden at Enkoping
62	Anton Zukrov	Scrum-half	24 Sep 1994	v Sweden at Enkoping
63	Vadim Fedorov	(Flanker)	24 Sep 1994	v Sweden at Enkoping
64	Andrei Sobolevsky	(Lock)	24 Sep 1994	v Sweden at Enkoping
65	E Kisilev		22 Oct 1994	v Netherlands at Moscow
66	I Novikov		22 Oct 1994	v Netherlands at Moscow
67	Konstantin Djintcharadze		1 Apr 1995	v Tunisia at Tunis
68	M Tumenev		1 Apr 1995	v Tunisia at Tunis
69	A Vergun		1 Apr 1995	v Tunisia at Tunis
70	A Podshibiakin		25 May 1995	v Norway at Hundested
71	Vadim Postnikov		25 May 1995	v Norway at Hundested
72	A Vasiliev		25 May 1995	v Norway at Hundested
73	Alexei Sysoev		28 May 1995	v Denmark at Hundested
74	Alexei Korobeynikov		14 Apr 1996	v Spain at Madrid
75	O Sheviakov		20 Oct 1996	v Georgia at Tbilisi
76	Vadim Balashov		26 Oct 1996	v Czech Republic at Moscow
77	Igor Budnikov		26 Oct 1996	v Czech Republic at Moscow
78	Dimitri Dyatlov		26 Oct 1996	v Czech Republic at Moscow
79	A Petrovetz		26 Oct 1996	v Czech Republic at Moscow
80	Andrey Kuzin		20 Apr 1997	v Tunisia at Tunis
81	Sergey Patlasov		20 Apr 1997	v Tunisia at Tunis
82	Roman Shelepkov		17 May 1997	v Morocco at Settat
83	Stanislav Krechun		28 Sep 1997	v Ukraine at Krasnoyarsk
84	Vasily Smirnov		28 Sep 1997	v Ukraine at Krasnoyarsk
85	Sergey Novoselov		2 Oct 1997	v Poland at Krasnoyarsk
86	Konstantin Rachkov		2 Oct 1997	v Poland at Krasnoyarsk
87	Vladimir Chernykh		19 Oct 1997	v Croatia at Makarska
88	Andrei Epimakhov	Wing	15 Mar 1998	v Spain at Sevilla
89	Petr Ilvovsky	Lock	15 Mar 1998	v Spain at Sevilla
90	Rostislav Mamin	Centre	3 May 1998	v Denmark at Penza
91	Dimitri Eskin	(Replacement)	3 May 1998	v Denmark at Penza
92	Sergey Sergeyev Sr.	Lock	20 May 1998	v Georgia at Tbilisi
93	Mourat Uanbayev	Flanker	20 May 1998	v Georgia at Tbilisi
94	Leonid Kuzmin	(Prop)	20 May 1998	v Georgia at Tbilisi
95	Oleg Azarenko		8 May 1999	v Ukraine at Penza
96	Viktor Motorin		8 May 1999	v Ukraine at Penza
97	Alexei Sarychev		8 May 1999	v Ukraine at Penza
98	Viktor Zdanovich		8 May 1999	v Ukraine at Penza
99	Andrei Chupin		29 May 1999	v Czech Republic at Vyskov
100	Yuri Shelepkov	(Replacement)	13 May 2000	v Denmark at Copenhagen
101	Oleg Zhukov	(Centre)	13 May 2000	v Denmark at Copenhagen
102	Vladimir Simonov	Flyhalf	4 Feb 2001	v Spain at Madrid
103	Alexei Travkin	(Prop)	4 Feb 2001	v Spain at Madrid
104	Vitaly Ilarionov		18 Feb 2001	v Netherlands at Amsterdam
105	Alexei Rechnev		18 Feb 2001	v Netherlands at Amsterdam
106	Roman Romak		8 Apr 2001	v Portugal at Krasnodar
107	Valery Fedchenko	Lock	2 Feb 2002	v Spain at Krasnodar
108	Coenraad Breytenbach	Centre	3 Mar 2002	v Georgia at Tbilisi
109	Bloues Volschenk	Flanker	3 Mar 2002	v Georgia at Tbilisi
110	Johan Hendriks	(Prop)	3 Mar 2002	v Georgia at Tbilisi
111	Werner Pieterse	Flyhalf	7 Apr 2002	v Portugal at Lousa
112	Rashid Sagdeev	Lock	7 Apr 2002	v Portugal at Lousa
113	Alexandr Ianyushkin	(Replacement)	5 May 2002	v Czech Republic at Prague
114	Vladislav Korshunov	No. 8	1 Jun 2002	v Netherlands at Moscow
115	Yuri Koshelev	Wing	1 Jun 2002	v Netherlands at Moscow
116	Ivan Naumenko	Flanker	1 Jun 2002	v Netherlands at Moscow
117	Alexei Protasov	Wing	1 Jun 2002	v Netherlands at Moscow
118	Sergey Kuzmenko	(Flyhalf)	27 Oct 2002	v Spain at Madrid
119	Igor Klyuchnikov	Fullback	9 Mar 2003	v Georgia at Krasnodar
120	Denis Akulov	Centre	29 Mar 2003	v Portugal at Krasnodar
121	Yaroslav Rechnev	Wing	25 May 2003	v Japan at Tokyo
122	Andrei Bykanov	(Scrum-half)	25 May 2003	v Japan at Tokyo
123	Artem Lubkov	Wing	14 Jun 2003	v Czech Republic at Prague
124	Alexander Voytov	Lock	14 Jun 2003	v Czech Republic at Prague
125	Sergey Popov	(Prop)	14 Jun 2003	v Czech Republic at Prague
126	Alexandr Kazantsev	(Replacement)	19 Jul 2003	v USA XV at Krasnodar
127	Ivan Prishchepenko	(Replacement)	19 Jul 2003	v USA XV at Krasnodar
128	Alexander Shakirov	(Scrum-half)	6 Mar 2004	v Georgia at Tbilisi
129	Dimitri Loskutov	Centre	20 Mar 2004	v Romania at Krasnodar
130	Roman Fedotov	Lock	27 May 2004	v Japan at Tokyo
131	Kirill Kushnarev	(Back-row)	27 May 2004	v Japan at Tokyo
132	Sergey Vasiliev	(Lock)	27 May 2004	v Japan at Tokyo
133	Andrei Lugin	(Lock)	30 May 2004	v USA at Tokyo
134	Pavel Novikov	Wing	20 Nov 2004	v Georgia at Krasnodar
135	Alexei Panasenko	No. 8	20 Nov 2004	v Georgia at Krasnodar
136	Andrey Garbuzov	Flanker	26 Feb 2005	v Romania at Timisoara
137	Alexandr Gvozdovsky	Wing	26 Feb 2005	v Romania at Timisoara
138	Oleg Kobzev	Centre	26 Feb 2005	v Romania at Timisoara
139	Sergey Sugrobov	Flyhalf	26 Feb 2005	v Romania at Timisoara
140	Maxim Uskov	Wing	26 Feb 2005	v Romania at Timisoara
141	Dimitri Malyakin	(Scrum-half)	26 Feb 2005	v Romania at Timisoara
142	Andrei Temnov	(Back-row)	11 Jun 2005	v Ukraine at Moscow
143	Yuri Kushnarev	Flyhalf	12 Nov 2005	v Czech Republic at Krasnodar
144	Sergey Trishin	Centre	12 Nov 2005	v Czech Republic at Krasnodar
145	Artem Fatakhov	(Replacement)	12 Nov 2005	v Czech Republic at Krasnodar
146	Kirill Kulemin	Lock	25 Feb 2006	v Portugal at Lisbon
147	Alexandr Vozdovskiy	Wing	25 Feb 2006	v Portugal at Lisbon
148	Andrei Igretsov	(Prop)	25 Feb 2006	v Portugal at Lisbon
149	Igor Kurashov	(Centre)	27 May 2006	v Ukraine at Kiev
150	Dimitri Zubarev	(Fullback)	27 May 2006	v Ukraine at Kiev
151	Valery Ignatev	Wing	10 Jun 2006	v Romania at Krasnoyarsk
152	Sergey Belousov	Centre	23 Sep 2006	v Ukraine at Odessa
153	Igor Galinovskiy	Wing	23 Sep 2006	v Ukraine at Odessa
154	Dimitri Polovykh	(Flanker)	23 Sep 2006	v Ukraine at Odessa
155	Vladimir Ostrushko	Wing	14 Oct 2006	v Italy at Moscow
156	Viktor Gresev	(Back-row)	14 Oct 2006	v Italy at Moscow
157	Mikhail Babaev	Wing	28 Oct 2006	v Portugal at Lisbon
158	Viktor Kobzev	(Lock)	10 Feb 2007	v Spain at Madrid
159	Maxim Kiselev	Lock	21 Apr 2007	v Czech Republic at Krasnodar
160	Dimitri Soldatov	Flanker	21 Apr 2007	v Czech Republic at Krasnodar
161	Evgeny Matveev	(Hooker)	21 Apr 2007	v Czech Republic at Krasnodar
162	Nikita Medkov	(Lock)	21 Apr 2007	v Czech Republic at Krasnodar
163	Nikolai Timosyuk	(Fullback)	21 Apr 2007	v Czech Republic at Krasnodar
164	Ivan Povesma	(Hooker)	12 May 2007	v Portugal at Lisbon
165	Andrei Ostrikov	Lock	1 Mar 2008	v Portugal at Krasnodar
166	Vladimir Botvinnikov	(Prop)	1 Mar 2008	v Portugal at Krasnodar
167	Alexei Chernyshev	(Prop)	1 Mar 2008	v Portugal at Krasnodar
168	Andrei Khvorostyanoy	(Flanker)	1 Mar 2008	v Portugal at Krasnodar
169	Nazir Gasanov	Hooker	19 Apr 2008	v Czech Republic at Prague
170	Rinat Timerbulatov	(Flanker)	19 Apr 2008	v Czech Republic at Prague
171	Aleksey Volkov	(Hooker)	19 Apr 2008	v Czech Republic at Prague
172	Sergey Shishkov	Flyhalf	11 Jun 2008	v Italy A at Bucharest
173	Alexei Andreev	(Flyhalf)	11 Jun 2008	v Italy A at Bucharest
174	Sergey Bazhenov	(Flanker)	11 Jun 2008	v Italy A at Bucharest
175	Dmitry Gerasimov	(Centre)	8 Nov 2008	v Spain at Moscow
176	Alexandr Zhuravliov	(Flyhalf)	8 Nov 2008	v Spain at Moscow
177	Evgeni Pronenko	Prop	7 Feb 2009	v Portugal at Lisbon
178	Vasily Artemyev	(Wing)	7 Feb 2009	v Portugal at Lisbon
179	Karlo Maglakelidze	Prop	12 Jun 2009	v Scotland A at Bucharest
180	Giorgi Minadze	(Lock)	16 Jun 2009	v Italy A at Bucharest
181	Alexey Makovetskiy	Centre	23 Jan 2010	v Namibia at Windhoek
182	Alexei Tolstykh	(Scrum-half)	23 Jan 2010	v Namibia at Windhoek
183	Sergey Sergeyev Jr.	Lock	5 Jun 2010	v USA at Glendale
184	Vladimir Boltenkov	Lock	23 Oct 2010	v Argentina A at Moscow
185	Valery Tsnobiladze	Hooker	23 Oct 2010	v Argentina A at Moscow
186	Alexei Shcherban	(Scrum-half)	23 Oct 2010	v Argentina A at Moscow
187	Yevgeni Titov	(Replacement)	23 Oct 2010	v Argentina A at Moscow
188	Denis Antonov	Lock	12 Jun 2011	v Italy A at Gloucester
189	Mikhail Sidorov	Flanker	12 Jun 2011	v Italy A at Gloucester
190	Grigory Tsnobiladze	Prop	12 Jun 2011	v Italy A at Gloucester
191	Ruslan Yagudin	Wing	12 Jun 2011	v Italy A at Gloucester
192	Anton Ryabov	(Flyhalf)	12 Jun 2011	v Italy A at Gloucester
193	Adam Byrnes	(Lock)	15 Sep 2011	v USA at New Plymouth
194	Denis Simplikevich	Wing	25 Sep 2011	v Ireland at Rotorua
195	Innokenty Zykov	(Prop)	11 Feb 2012	v Portugal at Lisbon
196	Pavel Kvernadze	(No. 8)	25 Feb 2012	v Romania at Sotchi
197	Anton Sinitsyn	No. 8	10 Mar 2012	v Ukraine at Sotchi
198	Pavel Butenko	(No. 8)	10 Mar 2012	v Ukraine at Sotchi
199	German Godlyuk	(Scrum-half)	10 Mar 2012	v Ukraine at Sotchi
200	Kirill Kopeshkin	(Prop)	10 Mar 2012	v Ukraine at Sotchi
201	Andrei Otrokov	(Wing)	10 Mar 2012	v Ukraine at Sotchi
202	Maxim Sturza	(Prop)	17 Mar 2012	v Georgia at Tbilisi
203	Ivan Kotov	Wing	8 Jun 2012	v Emerging Italy at Bucharest
204	Stanislav Sel'skiy	Hooker	8 Jun 2012	v Emerging Italy at Bucharest
205	Gleb Babkin	(Replacement)	9 Nov 2012	v USA at Colwyn Bay
206	Ramil Gaisin	(Flyhalf)	17 Nov 2012	v Canada at Colwyn Bay
207	Sergey Ianyushkin	Flyhalf	2 Feb 2013	v Spain at Sotchi
208	Maxim Timoshchuk	Hooker	23 Feb 2013	v Georgia at Sotchi
209	Andrey Polivalov	(Hooker)	23 Feb 2013	v Georgia at Sotchi
210	Ilya Osminko	Lock	8 Jun 2013	v Romania at Bucharest
211	Alexandr Khudyakov	(Lock)	8 Jun 2013	v Romania at Bucharest
212	Yuri Vengerov	No. 8	12 Jun 2013	v Emerging Italy at Bucharest
213	Sergey Sekisov	(Prop)	12 Jun 2013	v Emerging Italy at Bucharest
214	Vladimir Rudenko	(Centre)	22 Feb 2014	v Georgia at Tbilisi
215	Magomed Davudov	(Prop)	15 Mar 2014	v Belgium at Brussels
216	German Davydov	Centre	13 Jun 2014	v Emerging Ireland at Bucharest
217	Alexandr Bezverkhov	(Prop)	18 Jun 2014	v Romania at Bucharest
218	Vitaly Zhivatov	Flanker	8 Nov 2014	v Hong Kong at Hong Kong
219	Sergey Chernyshev	(Hooker)	8 Nov 2014	v Hong Kong at Hong Kong
220	Vasily Dorofeev	(Scrum-half)	8 Nov 2014	v Hong Kong at Hong Kong
221	Ilya Dyomushkin	(Fullback)	8 Nov 2014	v Hong Kong at Hong Kong
222	Nikolai Serkov	(Lock)	8 Nov 2014	v Hong Kong at Hong Kong
223	Dimitri Krotov	(Flanker)	14 Feb 2015	v Germany at Pforzheim
224	Danila Chegodaev	(Flanker)	11 Jul 2015	v Namibia at Windhoek
225	Evgeni Kolomiytsev	(Centre)	11 Jul 2015	v Namibia at Windhoek
226	Alexei Mikahltsov	(Wing)	11 Jul 2015	v Namibia at Windhoek
227	Vladimir Podrezov	(Prop)	11 Jul 2015	v Namibia at Windhoek
228	Andrei Lizogub	(Wing)	18 Jul 2015	v Namibia at Windhoek
229	Leo Derksen	Wing	13 Nov 2015	v Portugal at Hong Kong
230	Kirill Gotovtsev	Prop	13 Nov 2015	v Portugal at Hong Kong
231	Tahir Gadzhiev	(Lock)	13 Nov 2015	v Portugal at Hong Kong
232	Alexandr Ivanov	(Flanker)	13 Nov 2015	v Portugal at Hong Kong
233	Azamat Bitiev	Prop	17 Nov 2015	v Zimbabwe at Hong Kong
234	Nikita Ilienko	Wing	17 Nov 2015	v Zimbabwe at Hong Kong
235	Denis Kukishev	(Flyhalf)	17 Nov 2015	v Zimbabwe at Hong Kong
236	Anton Sychev	(No. 8)	17 Nov 2015	v Zimbabwe at Hong Kong
237	Anton Rudoy	No. 8	6 Feb 2016	v Spain at Sotchi
238	Evgeni Elgin	Lock	13 Feb 2016	v Germany at Sotchi
239	Shamil Magomedov	(Hooker)	12 Mar 2016	v Georgia at Sotchi
240	Konstantin Uzunov	Wing	18 Jun 2016	v Canada at Calgary
241	Kirill Golosnitsky	Centre	25 Jun 2016	v USA at Sacramento
242	Bogdan Fedotko	Lock	11 Nov 2016	v Zimbabwe at Hong Kong
243	Valery Morozov	(Prop)	11 Nov 2016	v Zimbabwe at Hong Kong
244	Vladimir Suslov	(Lock)	11 Nov 2016	v Zimbabwe at Hong Kong
245	Dimitri Gritsenko	(Centre)	12 Mar 2017	v Georgia at Tbilisi
246	Alexandr Budychenko	(Centre)	14 Jun 2017	v Uruguay at Montevideo
247	Evgeni Nepeivoda	(Fullback)	14 Jun 2017	v Uruguay at Montevideo
248	Evgeni Mishechkin	(Prop)	18 Jun 2017	v Namibia at Montevideo
249	Vladislav Sozonov	Wing	10 Nov 2017	v Hong Kong at Hong Kong
250	Alexandr Ilin	(Flanker)	10 Nov 2017	v Hong Kong at Hong Kong
251	Kirill Gubin	Centre	14 Nov 2017	v Kenya at Hong Kong
252	Nikita Bekov	(Flanker)	14 Nov 2017	v Kenya at Hong Kong
253	Nikita Vavilin	(Flanker)	18 Mar 2018	v Germany at Cologne
254	Anton Drozdov	(Lock)	9 Jun 2018	v USA at Commerce City
255	Dimitri Perov	Scrum-half	10 Nov 2018	v Namibia at Krasnodar
256	Daniil Potikhanov	Wing	10 Nov 2018	v Namibia at Krasnodar
257	Roman Khodin	(No. 8)	10 Nov 2018	v Namibia at Krasnodar
258	Viktor Kononov	(Wing)	10 Nov 2018	v Namibia at Krasnodar
259	Eme Patris Peki	Flanker	4 Jun 2019	v Uruguay at Montevideo
260	Nikita Churashov	(Wing)	15 Jun 2019	v Namibia at Montevideo
261	Leonid Kalinin	(Hooker)	15 Jun 2019	v Namibia at Montevideo
262	Igor Zykov	Lock	1 Feb 2020	v Spain at Sochi
263	Khetag Dzobelov	(Wing)	8 Feb 2020	v Belgium at Woluwe-Saint-Lambert
264	Stepan Khokhlov	(Scrum-half)	8 Feb 2020	v Belgium at Woluwe-Saint-Lambert
265	Stanislav Bondarev	(Wing)	22 Feb 2020	v Portugal at Kalingrad
266	Luc Brocas	Centre	7 Feb 2021	v Georgia at Tbilisi
267	Andrei Karzanov	Fullback	7 Feb 2021	v Georgia at Tbilisi
268	German Silenko	Lock	7 Feb 2021	v Georgia at Tbilisi
269	Alexandr Belosludtsev	(Scrum-half)	7 Feb 2021	v Georgia at Tbilisi
270	Vladislav Perestyak	(Flanker)	7 Feb 2021	v Georgia at Tbilisi
271	Alexei Skobiola	(Prop)	7 Feb 2021	v Georgia at Tbilisi
272	Denis Barabantsev	(Scrum-half)	20 Mar 2021	v Georgia at Kalingrad
273	Stepan Seriakov	(Prop)	20 Mar 2021	v Georgia at Kalingrad
274	Shamil Davudov	(Hooker)	17 Jul 2021	v Portugal at Nizhny Novgorod
275	Vadim Zharkov	(Lock)	17 Jul 2021	v Portugal at Nizhny Novgorod
276	Artemy Gallo	Flanker	6 Nov 2021	v Netherlands at Amsterdam
277	Alishan Umarov	(Hooker)	6 Nov 2021	v Netherlands at Amsterdam
