= 2011 Rugby World Cup Pool C =

Pool C of the 2011 Rugby World Cup began on 11 September 2011 and was completed on 2 October. The pool was composed of Australia, Ireland, Italy, Russia and the United States. While history would suggest Pool C as a predictable in outcome, this was not the case. A shock win by the Irish over Australia saw Australia finish second in the pool stage for the second time, the first being in 1995 after the loss to the hosts South Africa.

== Standings ==
Pos	Team	Pld	W	D	L	PF	PA	PD	T	B	Pts	Qualification
1	Ireland	4	4	0	0	135	34	+101	15	1	17	Advanced to the quarter-finals and qualified for the 2015 Rugby World Cup
2	Australia	4	3	0	1	173	48	+125	25	3	15	Advanced to the quarter-finals and qualified for the 2015 Rugby World Cup
3	Italy	4	2	0	2	92	95	−3	13	2	10	Eliminated but qualified for 2015 Rugby World Cup
4	United States	4	1	0	3	38	122	−84	4	0	4	
5	Russia	4	0	0	4	57	196	−139	8	1	1	

== Matches ==
All times are local New Zealand time (UTC+12 until 24 September, UTC+13 from 25 September)

=== Australia v Italy ===
11 September 2011
15:30

Australia	32–6	Italy
Try: Alexander 50' m Ashley-Cooper 55' c O'Connor 58' c Roff 66' c Con: O'Connor (3/4); Pen: Cooper (2/3) 19', 30'	Report	Pen: Mi. Bergamasco (2/3) 38', 40+'

North Harbour Stadium, Auckland
Attendance: 25,731
Referee: Alain Rolland (Ireland)

FB	15	Kurtley Beale
RW	14	Adam Ashley-Cooper
OC	13	Anthony Fainga'a	(substituted off) 48'
IC	12	Pat McCabe
LW	11	Digby Ioane
FH	10	Quade Cooper
SH	9	Will Genia	(substituted off) 62'
N8	8	Radike Samo
OF	7	David Pocock	(substituted off) 61'
BF	6	Rocky Elsom	(substituted off) 70'
RL	5	James Horwill (c)
LL	4	Dan Vickerman	(substituted off) 71'
TP	3	Ben Alexander	(substituted off) 66'
HK	2	Stephen Moore	(substituted off) 62'	(substituted on) 74'	(substituted off) 78'
LP	1	Sekope Kepu
Replacements:
HK	16	Tatafu Polota-Nau	(substituted on) 62'	(substituted off) 74'	(substituted on) 78'
PR	17	James Slipper	(substituted on) 66'
LK	18	Rob Simmons	(substituted on) 71'
N8	19	Ben McCalman	(substituted on) 61'
FL	20	Scott Higginbotham	(substituted on) 70'
SH	21	Luke Burgess	(substituted on) 62'
WG	22	James O'Connor	(substituted on) 48'
Coach:
(New Zealand) Robbie Deans

FB	15	Andrea Masi
RW	14	Tommaso Benvenuti
OC	13	Gonzalo Canale
IC	12	Gonzalo García	(substituted off) 62'
LW	11	Mirco Bergamasco
FH	10	Luciano Orquera	(substituted off) 73'
SH	9	Fabio Semenzato	(substituted off) 70'
N8	8	Sergio Parisse (c)
OF	7	Robert Barbieri	(substituted off) 52'
BF	6	Alessandro Zanni
RL	5	Corniel van Zyl
LL	4	Carlo Del Fava	(substituted off) 61'
TP	3	Martin Castrogiovanni		(substituted off) 74'
HK	2	Leonardo Ghiraldini
LP	1	Andrea Lo Cicero	(substituted off) 68'	(substituted on) 74'
Replacements:
HK	16	Tommaso D'Apice
PR	17	Lorenzo Cittadini	(substituted on) 68'
LK	18	Marco Bortolami	(substituted on) 61'
FL	19	Paul Derbyshire	(substituted on) 52'
SH	20	Edoardo Gori	(substituted on) 70'
FH	21	Riccardo Bocchino	(substituted on) 73'
FB	22	Luke McLean	(substituted on) 62'
Coach:
(South Africa) Nick Mallett

Man of the Match:
James Horwill (Australia)

Touch judges:
Jonathan Kaplan (South Africa)
Chris Pollock (New Zealand)
Television match official:
Giulio De Santis (Italy)

=== Ireland v United States ===
11 September 2011
18:00

Ireland	22–10	United States
Try: Bowe (2) 40' c, 60' c Best 56' m Con: Sexton (1/1); O'Gara (1/2); Pen: Sexton (1/5) 17'	Report	Try: Emerick 80+' c Con: Malifa (1/1); Pen: Paterson (1/2) 54'

Yarrow Stadium, New Plymouth
Attendance: 20,823
Referee: Craig Joubert (South Africa)

FB	15	Geordan Murphy	(substituted off) 67'
RW	14	Tommy Bowe
OC	13	Brian O'Driscoll (c)
IC	12	Gordon D'Arcy
LW	11	Keith Earls
FH	10	Johnny Sexton	(substituted off) 51'
SH	9	Conor Murray	(substituted off) 51'
N8	8	Jamie Heaslip
OF	7	Shane Jennings	(substituted off) 61'
BF	6	Stephen Ferris
RL	5	Paul O'Connell
LL	4	Donncha O'Callaghan
TP	3	Mike Ross
HK	2	Rory Best	(substituted off) 61'
LP	1	Tom Court	(substituted off) 65'
Replacements:
HK	16	Jerry Flannery	(substituted on) 61'
PR	17	Tony Buckley	(substituted on) 65'
LK	18	Donnacha Ryan
N8	19	Denis Leamy	(substituted on) 61'
SH	20	Eoin Reddan	(substituted on) 51'
FH	21	Ronan O'Gara	(substituted on) 51'
WG	22	Andrew Trimble	(substituted on) 67'
Coach:
Declan Kidney

FB	15	Blaine Scully
RW	14	Takudzwa Ngwenya
OC	13	Paul Emerick
IC	12	Andrew Suniula
LW	11	James Paterson
FH	10	Roland Suniula	(substituted off) 59'
SH	9	Mike Petri	(substituted off) 67'
N8	8	Nic Johnson
OF	7	Todd Clever (c)
BF	6	Louis Stanfill
RL	5	Hayden Smith
LL	4	John van der Giessen
TP	3	Shawn Pittman
HK	2	Phil Thiel	(substituted off) 68'
LP	1	Mike MacDonald	(substituted off) 63'
Replacements:
HK	16	Chris Biller	(substituted on) 68'
PR	17	Matekitonga Moeakiola	(substituted on) 63'
LK	18	Scott LaValla
FL	19	Pat Danahy
SH	20	Tim Usasz	(substituted on) 67'
FH	21	Nese Malifa	(substituted on) 59'
WG	22	Colin Hawley
Coach:
(Ireland) Eddie O'Sullivan

Man of the Match:
Paul O'Connell (Ireland)

Touch judges:
Nigel Owens (Wales)
Carlo Damasco (Italy)
Television match official:
Graham Hughes (England)

=== Russia v United States ===
15 September 2011
19:30

Russia	6–13	United States
Pen: Kushnarev (1/4) 3'; Rachkov (1/1) 78'	Report	Try: Petri 19' c Con: Wyles (1/1); Pen: Wyles (2/5) 12', 65'

Yarrow Stadium, New Plymouth
Attendance: 13,931
Referee: Dave Pearson (England)

FB	15	Igor Klyuchnikov
RW	14	Vasily Artemyev
OC	13	Konstantin Rachkov
IC	12	Alexei Makovetskiy
LW	11	Vladimir Ostroushko
FH	10	Yuri Kushnarev
SH	9	Alexander Shakirov
N8	8	Viacheslav Grachev
OF	7	Andrei Garbuzov
BF	6	Artem Fatakhov	(substituted off) 59'
RL	5	Denis Antonov	(substituted off) 61'
LL	4	Alexander Voytov
TP	3	Ivan Prishchepenko
HK	2	Vladislav Korshunov (c)
LP	1	Sergei Popov	(substituted off) 73'
Replacements:
HK	16	Valeri Tsnobiladze
PR	17	Vladmimir Botvinnikov	(substituted on) 73'
PR	18	Alexander Khrokin
LK	19	Adam Byrnes	(substituted on) 61'
SH	20	Alexander Yanyushkin
N8	21	Victor Gresev	(substituted on) 59'
WG	22	Andrei Kuzin
Coaches:
Nikolay Nerush (Wales) Kingsley Jones

FB	15	Chris Wyles
RW	14	Takudzwa Ngwenya
OC	13	Paul Emerick
IC	12	Andrew Suniula
LW	11	James Paterson	(substituted off) 38'
FH	10	Roland Suniula
SH	9	Mike Petri	(substituted off) 68'
N8	8	Nic Johnson	(substituted off) 67'
OF	7	Todd Clever (c)
BF	6	Louis Stanfill
RL	5	Hayden Smith
LL	4	John van der Giessen
TP	3	Matekitonga Moeakiola	40' to 42'
HK	2	Chris Biller
LP	1	Mike MacDonald
Replacements:
HK	16	Phil Thiel
PR	17	Shawn Pittman	(substituted on) 40'	(substituted off) 42'
LK	18	Scott LaValla	(substituted on) 67'
FL	19	Pat Danahy
SH	20	Tim Usasz	(substituted on) 68'
FH	21	Nese Malifa
FB	22	Blaine Scully	(substituted on) 38'
Coach:
(Ireland) Eddie O'Sullivan

Man of the Match:
Mike MacDonald (United States)

Touch judges:
Craig Joubert (South Africa)
Carlo Damasco (Ireland)
Television match official:
Graham Hughes (England)

=== Australia v Ireland ===
17 September 2011
20:30

Australia	6–15	Ireland
Pen: O'Connor (2/4) 11', 23'	Report	Pen: Sexton (2/5) 17', 49'; O'Gara (2/2) 62', 71'; Drop: Sexton 19'

Eden Park, Auckland
Attendance: 58,678
Referee: Bryce Lawrence (New Zealand)

FB	15	Kurtley Beale
RW	14	James O'Connor
OC	13	Anthony Fainga'a	(substituted off) 75'
IC	12	Pat McCabe
LW	11	Adam Ashley-Cooper
FH	10	Quade Cooper
SH	9	Will Genia
N8	8	Radike Samo	(substituted off) 74'
OF	7	Ben McCalman
BF	6	Rocky Elsom	(substituted off) 73'
RL	5	James Horwill (c)
LL	4	Dan Vickerman	(substituted off) 63'
TP	3	Ben Alexander	(substituted off) 63'
HK	2	Tatafu Polota-Nau
LP	1	Sekope Kepu
Replacements:
HK	16	Saia Fainga'a
PR	17	James Slipper	(substituted on) 63'
LK	18	Rob Simmons	(substituted on) 63'
N8	19	Wycliff Palu	(substituted on) 73'
FL	20	Scott Higginbotham	(substituted on) 74'
SH	21	Luke Burgess
WG	22	Drew Mitchell	(substituted on) 75'
Coach:
(New Zealand) Robbie Deans

FB	15	Rob Kearney			(substituted off) 75'
RW	14	Tommy Bowe
OC	13	Brian O'Driscoll (c)	60' to 63'
IC	12	Gordon D'Arcy	(substituted off) 50'
LW	11	Keith Earls
FH	10	Johnny Sexton
SH	9	Eoin Reddan	(substituted off) 57'
N8	8	Jamie Heaslip
OF	7	Seán O'Brien
BF	6	Stephen Ferris
RL	5	Paul O'Connell
LL	4	Donncha O'Callaghan
TP	3	Mike Ross	(substituted off) 77'
HK	2	Rory Best
LP	1	Cian Healy
Replacements:
HK	16	Seán Cronin
PR	17	Tom Court	(substituted on) 77'
LK	18	Donnacha Ryan
N8	19	Denis Leamy
SH	20	Conor Murray	(substituted on) 57'
FH	21	Ronan O'Gara	(substituted on) 50'
WG	22	Andrew Trimble	(substituted on) 60'	(substituted off) 63'	(substituted on) 75'
Coach:
Declan Kidney

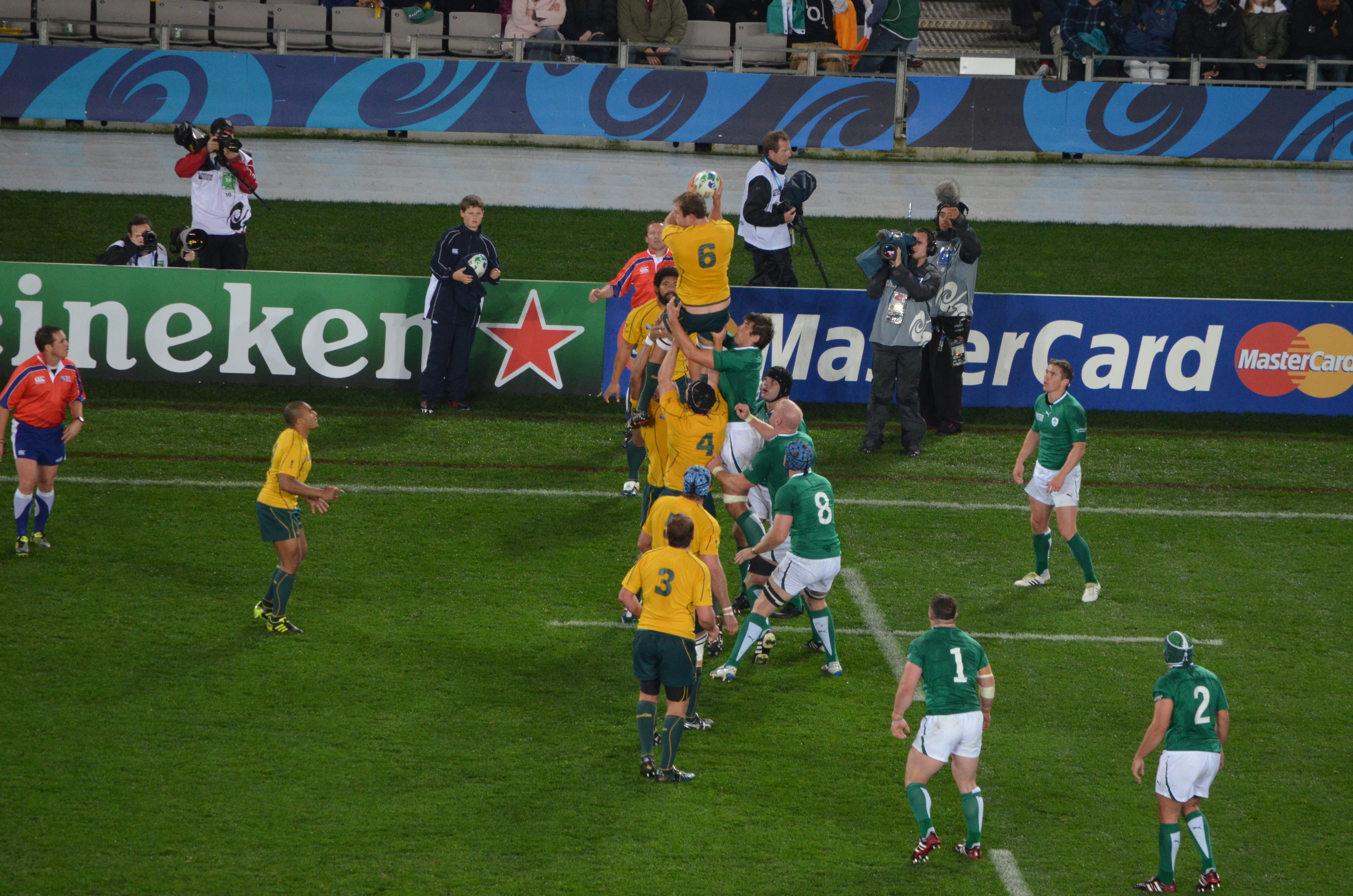
Match Australia vs Ireland

Man of the Match:
Cian Healy (Ireland)

Touch judges:
Craig Joubert (South Africa)
Carlo Damasco (Italy)
Television match official:
Graham Hughes (England)

=== Italy v Russia ===
20 September 2011
19:30

Italy	53–17	Russia
Try: Parisse 6' c Toniolatti (2) 13' m, 23' c Benvenuti (2) 16' m, 48' m Penalty try 29' c Gori 37' c McLean 64' m Zanni 77' m Con: Bocchino (4/6)	Report	Try: Yanyushkin 34' c Ostroushko 50' m Makovetski 71' m Con: Rachkov (1/3)

Trafalgar Park, Nelson
Attendance: 12,418
Referee: Wayne Barnes (England)

FB	15	Andrea Masi		(substituted off) 60'
RW	14	Giulio Toniolatti
OC	13	Tommaso Benvenuti
IC	12	Matteo Pratichetti
LW	11	Luke McLean
FH	10	Riccardo Bocchino		(substituted off) 73'
SH	9	Edoardo Gori		(substituted off) 57'
N8	8	Sergio Parisse (c)		(substituted off) 57'
OF	7	Mauro Bergamasco		(substituted off) 36'	(substituted on) 47'
BF	6	Paul Derbyshire
RL	5	Marco Bortolami		(substituted off) 48'
LL	4	Quintin Geldenhuys
TP	3	Lorenzo Cittadini
HK	2	Fabio Ongaro	(yellow card) 33'		(substituted off) 47'
LP	1	Salvatore Perugini		(substituted off) 48'
Replacements:
HK	16	Tommaso D'Apice		(substituted on) 36'
PR	17	Martin Castrogiovanni		(substituted on) 48'
LK	18	Corniel van Zyl		(substituted on) 48'
FL	19	Alessandro Zanni		(substituted on) 57'
SH	20	Pablo Canavosio		(substituted on) 57'
CE	21	Gonzalo Canale		(substituted on) 73'
CE	22	Alberto Sgarbi		(substituted on) 60'
Coach:
(South Africa) Nick Mallett

FB	15	Igor Klyuchnikov	(substituted off) 33'
RW	14	Vasily Artemyev
OC	13	Andrei Kuzin
IC	12	Alexei Makovetskiy
LW	11	Vladimir Ostroushko
FH	10	Konstantin Rachkov
SH	9	Alexander Shakirov	(substituted off) 28'
N8	8	Victor Gresev
OF	7	Andrei Garbuzov	(substituted off) 69'
BF	6	Viacheslav Grachev	(substituted off) 64'
RL	5	Adam Byrnes	(substituted off) 65'
LL	4	Alexander Voytov
TP	3	Ivan Prishchepenko		(substituted off) 77'
HK	2	Vladislav Korshunov (c)	(substituted off) 61'
LP	1	Vladmimir Botvinnikov	(substituted off) 54'	(substituted on) 77'
Replacements:
HK	16	Valeri Tsnobiladze	(substituted on) 61'
PR	17	Alexander Khrokin	(substituted on) 54'
LK	18	Denis Antonov	(substituted on) 65'
FL	19	Artem Fatakhov	(substituted on) 64'
SH	20	Alexander Yanyushkin	(substituted on) 28'
FL	21	Mikhail Sidorov	(substituted on) 69'
FH	22	Yuri Kushnarev	(substituted on) 33'
Coaches:
Nikolay Nerush (Wales) Kingsley Jones

Man of the Match:
Victor Gresev (Russia)

Touch judges:
Chris Pollock (New Zealand)
Garratt Williamson (New Zealand)
Television match official:
Shaun Veldsman (South Africa)

=== Australia v United States ===
23 September 2011
20:30

Australia	67–5	United States
Try: Horne 8' m Elsom 11' m Beale 31' c Fainga'a (2) 35' m, 71' m Mitchell 45' c McCabe 48' m Ashley-Cooper (3) 59' c, 64' c, 66' c Samo 78' c Con: Cooper (2/5); Barnes (4/5)	Report	Try: Gagiano 23' m

Wellington Regional Stadium, Wellington
Attendance: 33,824
Referee: Nigel Owens (Wales)

FB	15	Kurtley Beale	(substituted off) 39'
RW	14	Adam Ashley-Cooper
OC	13	Anthony Faingaa
IC	12	Rob Horne	(substituted off) 48'
LW	11	Drew Mitchell
FH	10	Quade Cooper
SH	9	Will Genia (c)	(substituted off) 49'
N8	8	Wycliff Palu	(substituted off) 54'
OF	7	Ben McCalman
BF	6	Rocky Elsom	(substituted off) 47'
RL	5	Nathan Sharpe
LL	4	Rob Simmonds
TP	3	Ben Alexander	(substituted off) 50'
HK	2	Tatafu Polota-Nau
LP	1	James Slipper
Replacements:
HK	16	Stephen Moore		(substituted on) 66'
PR	17	Sekope Kepu	(substituted on) 50'
LK	18	Dan Vickerman	(substituted on) 54'
N8	19	Radike Samo	(substituted on) 47'
SH	20	Luke Burgess	(substituted on) 49'
FH	21	Berrick Barnes	(substituted on) 39'
CE	22	Pat McCabe	(substituted on) 48'	(substituted off) 66'
Coach:
(New Zealand) Robbie Deans

FB	15	Blaine Scully	(yellow card) 75'
RW	14	Colin Hawley
OC	13	Tai Enosa		(substituted off) 73'
IC	12	Junior Sifa
LW	11	Kevin Swiryn
FH	10	Nese Malifa
SH	9	Tim Usasz (c)		(substituted off) 69'
N8	8	JJ Gagiano
OF	7	Pat Danahy		(substituted off) 75'
BF	6	Inaki Basauri
RL	5	Hayden Smith		(substituted off) 61'
LL	4	Scott LaValla
TP	3	Eric Fry
HK	2	Phil Thiel		(substituted off) 72'
LP	1	Mike MacDonald
Replacements:
HK	16	Brian McClenahan		(substituted on) 72'
PR	17	Matekitonga Moeakiola
FL	18	Louis Stanfill		(substituted on) 61'
N8	19	Nic Johnson		(substituted on) 75'
SH	20	Mike Petri		(substituted on) 69'
FH	21	Roland Suniula
FB	22	Chris Wyles		(substituted on) 73'
Coach:
(Ireland) Eddie O'Sullivan

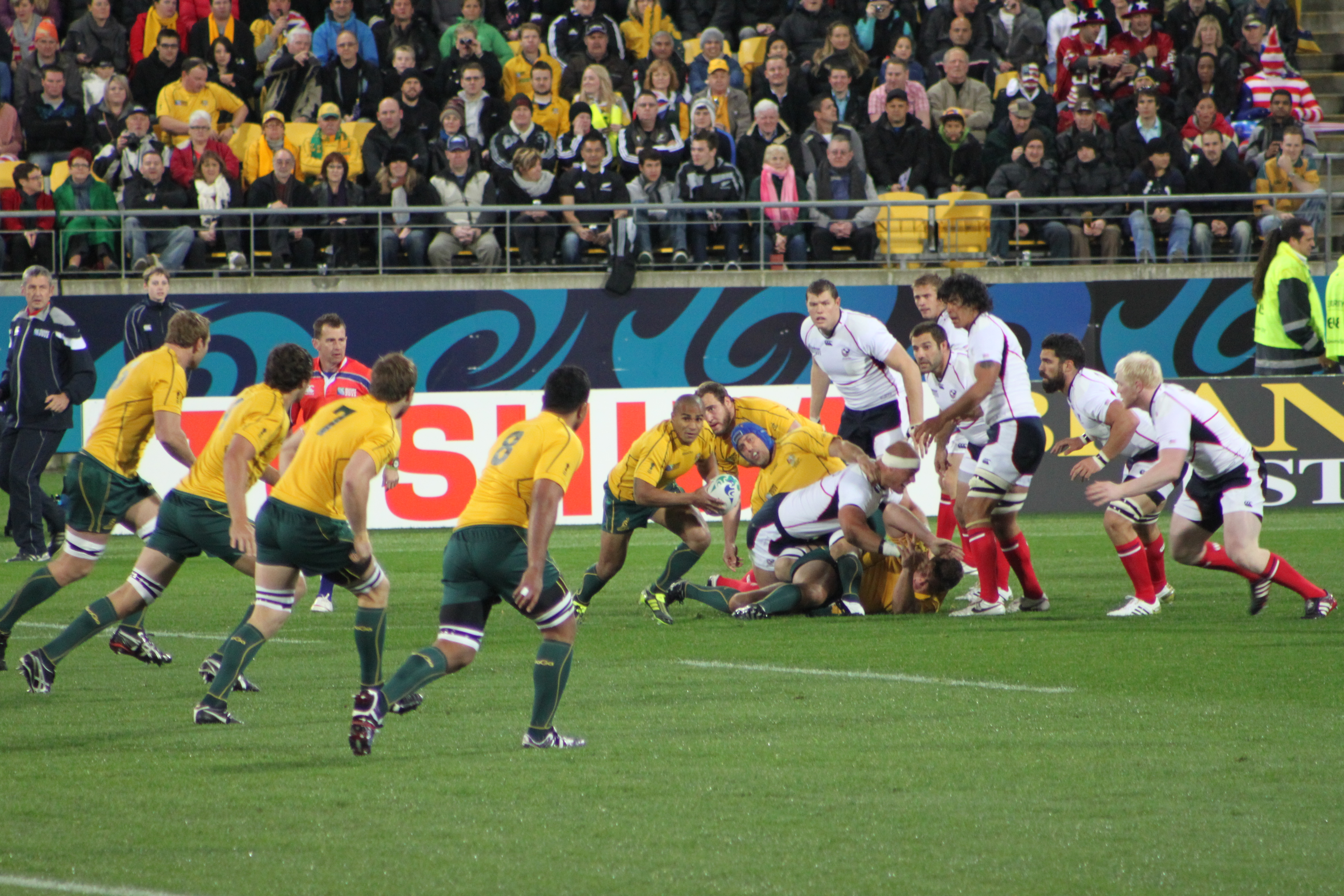
Match Australia vs USA

Man of the Match:
Adam Ashley-Cooper (Australia)

Touch judges:
Wayne Barnes (England)
Vinny Munro (New Zealand)
Television match official:
Tim Hayes (Wales)

=== Ireland v Russia ===
25 September 2011
18:00

Ireland	62–12	Russia
Try: McFadden 10' c O'Brien 13' c Boss 38' c Earls (2) 38' c, 48' c Trimble 40+' m Kearney 65' c Jennings 73' c Buckley 79' m Con: O'Gara (6/7); Sexton (1/2); Pen: O'Gara (1/1) 6'	Report	Try: Artemyev 50' c Simplikevich 59' m Con: Rachkov (1/2)

Rotorua International Stadium, Rotorua
Attendance: 25,661
Referee: Craig Joubert (South Africa)

FB	15	Rob Kearney
RW	14	Fergus McFadden
OC	13	Keith Earls	(substituted off) 49'
IC	12	Paddy Wallace
LW	11	Andrew Trimble
FH	10	Ronan O'Gara	(substituted off) 67'
SH	9	Isaac Boss	(substituted off) 66'
N8	8	Jamie Heaslip
OF	7	Seán O'Brien	(substituted off) 57'
BF	6	Donnacha Ryan
RL	5	Leo Cullen (c)
LL	4	Donncha O'Callaghan	(substituted off) 46'
TP	3	Tony Buckley
HK	2	Seán Cronin
LP	1	Cian Healy	(substituted off) 49'
Replacements:
HK	16	Rory Best
PR	17	Mike Ross	(substituted on) 49'
N8	18	Denis Leamy	(substituted on) 46'
FL	19	Shane Jennings	(substituted on) 57'
SH	20	Eoin Reddan	(substituted on) 66'
FH	21	Johnny Sexton	(substituted on) 67'
FB	22	Geordan Murphy	(substituted on) 49'
Coach:
Declan Kidney

FB	15	Vasily Artemyev
RW	14	Denis Simplikevich
OC	13	Andrei Kuzin
IC	12	Sergey Trishin			(substituted off) 72'
LW	11	Vladimir Ostroushko		66' to 72'
FH	10	Konstantin Rachkov	(yellow card) 8'
SH	9	Alexander Yanyushkin (c)		(substituted off) 74'
N8	8	Victor Gresev
OF	7	Andrei Garbuzov		(substituted off) 45'
BF	6	Artem Fatakhov
RL	5	Adam Byrnes
LL	4	Denis Antonov		(substituted off) 49'
TP	3	Alexander Khrokin		(substituted off) 50'
HK	2	Vladislav Korshunov
LP	1	Sergey Popov		(substituted off) 74'
Replacements:
HK	16	Yevgeny Matveyev			(substituted on) 50'	(substituted off) 54'
PR	17	Ivan Prishchepenko		(substituted on) 50'
PR	18	Alexey Travkin		(substituted on) 74'
LK	19	Alexander Voytov		(substituted on) 49'
SH	20	Andrey Bykanov		(substituted on) 74'
FL	21	Mikhail Sidorov		(substituted on) 45'	50' to 54'
CE	22	Mikhail Babaev		(substituted on) 66'		(substituted off) 74'
Coaches:
Nikolay Nerush (Wales) Kingsley Jones

Man of the Match:
Ronan O'Gara (Ireland)

Touch judges:
Dave Pearson (England)
Jérôme Garces (France)
Television match official:
Giulio De Santis (Italy)

=== Italy v United States ===
27 September 2011
19:30

Italy	27–10	United States
Try: Parisse 3' c Orquera 30' m Castrogiovanni 40' m Penalty try 66' c Con: Mi. Bergamasco (2/4); Pen: Mi. Bergamasco (1/1) 22'	Report	Try: Wyles 18' c Con: Wyles (1/1); Pen: Wyles (1/1) 28'

Trafalgar Park, Nelson
Attendance: 14,997
Referee: George Clancy (Ireland)

FB	15	Luke McLean
RW	14	Tommaso Benvenuti	(substituted off) 54'
OC	13	Gonzalo Canale
IC	12	Gonzalo García
LW	11	Mirco Bergamasco	(substituted off) 70'
FH	10	Luciano Orquera	(substituted off) 67'
SH	9	Fabio Semenzato	(substituted off) 67'
N8	8	Sergio Parisse (c)
OF	7	Mauro Bergamasco
BF	6	Alessandro Zanni
RL	5	Corniel van Zyl
LL	4	Quintin Geldenhuys
TP	3	Martin Castrogiovanni		(substituted off) 72'
HK	2	Leonardo Ghiraldini	(substituted off) 73'
LP	1	Salvatore Perugini	(substituted off) 51'	(substituted on) 72'
Replacements:
HK	16	Fabio Ongaro	(substituted on) 73'
PR	17	Andrea Lo Cicero	(substituted on) 51'
LK	18	Marco Bortolami
FL	19	Paul Derbyshire	(substituted on) 70'
SH	20	Edoardo Gori	(substituted on) 67'
FH	21	Riccardo Bocchino	(substituted on) 67'
WG	22	Giulio Toniolatti	(substituted on) 54'
Coach:
(South Africa) Nick Mallett

FB	15	Chris Wyles
RW	14	Takudzwa Ngwenya
OC	13	Paul Emerick
IC	12	Andrew Suniula		(substituted off) 72'
LW	11	James Paterson
FH	10	Roland Suniula		(substituted off) 46'
SH	9	Mike Petri		(substituted off) 64'
N8	8	Nic Johnson		(substituted off) 68'
OF	7	Todd Clever (c)
BF	6	Louis Stanfill	(yellow card) 59'
RL	5	Hayden Smith
LL	4	John van der Giessen
TP	3	Matekitonga Moeakiola		8' to 14'		(substituted off) 56'
HK	2	Chris Biller		(substituted off) 29'
LP	1	Mike MacDonald
Replacements:
HK	16	Phil Thiel		(substituted on) 29'
PR	17	Shawn Pittman		(substituted on) 8'	(substituted off) 14'	(substituted on) 56'
LK	18	Scott LaValla		(substituted on) 68'
FL	19	Pat Danahy
SH	20	Tim Usasz		(substituted on) 64'
FH	21	Nese Malifa		(substituted on) 72'
FB	22	Blaine Scully		(substituted on) 46'
Coach:
(Ireland) Eddie O'Sullivan

Man of the Match:
Martin Castrogiovanni (Italy)

Touch judges:
Wayne Barnes (England)
Chris Pollock (New Zealand)
Television match official:
Shaun Veldsman (South Africa)

=== Australia v Russia ===
1 October 2011
15:30

Australia	68–22	Russia
Try: Barnes (2) 7' m, 79' c Mitchell (2) 9' c, 49' c McCalman 12' c Pocock (2) 15' c, 22' c Moore 36' c Ashley-Cooper 39' c Ma'afu 42' c Con: O'Connor (9/10)	Report	Try: Ostroushko 33' m Simplikevich 60' c Rachkov 68' c Con: Rachkov (2/2); Drop: Rachkov (1/1) 47'

Trafalgar Park, Nelson
Attendance: 16,307
Referee: Bryce Lawrence (New Zealand)

FB	15	James O'Connor
RW	14	Radike Samo
OC	13	Adam Ashley-Cooper
IC	12	Berrick Barnes
LW	11	Drew Mitchell	(substituted off) 54'
FH	10	Quade Cooper
SH	9	Luke Burgess
N8	8	Ben McCalman
OF	7	David Pocock	(substituted off) 41'
BF	6	Scott Higginbotham
RL	5	Nathan Sharpe
LL	4	James Horwill (c)	(substituted off) 41'
TP	3	Sekope Kepu	(substituted off) 31'	(substituted on) 69'
HK	2	Stephen Moore	(substituted off) 41'
LP	1	James Slipper		(substituted off) 69'
Replacements:
HK	16	Tatafu Polota-Nau
HK	17	Saia Faingaa	(substituted on) 41'
PR	18	Salesi Ma'afu	(substituted on) 31'
LK	19	Rob Simmons	(substituted on) 41'
FL	20	Rocky Elsom	(substituted on) 41'
SH	21	Will Genia
SH	22	Nick Phipps	(substituted on) 54'
Coach:
(New Zealand) Robbie Deans

FB	15	Vasily Artemyev
RW	14	Denis Simplikevich
OC	13	Andrei Kuzin	(substituted off) 60'
IC	12	Alexey Makovetskiy
LW	11	Vladimir Ostroushko
FH	10	Yuri Kushnarev	(substituted off) 41'
SH	9	Alexander Yanyushkin	(substituted off) 64'
N8	8	Victor Gresev
OF	7	Viacheslav Grachev	(substituted off) 50'
BF	6	Artem Fatakhov	(substituted off) 73'
RL	5	Adam Byrnes
LL	4	Alexander Voytov
TP	3	Ivan Prishchepenko	(substituted off) 60'
HK	2	Vladislav Korshunov (c)
LP	1	Sergey Popov	(substituted off) 66'
Replacements:
HK	16	Yevgeny Matveyev	(substituted on) 73'
PR	17	Vladimir Botvinnikov	(substituted on) 66'
PR	18	Alexei Travkin	(substituted on) 60'
FL	19	Andrey Garbuzov	(substituted on) 50'
SH	20	Alexander Shakirov	(substituted on) 64'
FH	21	Konstantin Rachkov	(substituted on) 41'
CE	22	Mikhail Babaev	(substituted on) 60'
Coaches:
Nikolay Nerush (Wales) Kingsley Jones

Man of the Match:
Victor Gresev (Russia)

Touch judges:
George Clancy (Ireland)
Simon McDowell (Ireland)
Television match official:
Shaun Veldsman (South Africa)

=== Ireland v Italy ===
2 October 2011
20:30

Ireland	36–6	Italy
Try: O'Driscoll 47' c Earls (2) 52' c, 80+' c Con: O'Gara (2/2); Sexton (1/1); Pen: O'Gara (4/5) 7', 18', 35', 44'; Sexton (1/1) 70'	Report	Pen: Mi. Bergamasco (2/3) 11', 21'

Otago Stadium, Dunedin
Attendance: 28,027
Referee: Jonathan Kaplan (South Africa)

FB	15	Rob Kearney
RW	14	Tommy Bowe
OC	13	Brian O'Driscoll (c)	(substituted off) 74'
IC	12	Gordon D'Arcy
LW	11	Keith Earls
FH	10	Ronan O'Gara	(substituted off) 67'
SH	9	Conor Murray	(substituted off) 74'
N8	8	Jamie Heaslip
OF	7	Seán O'Brien
BF	6	Stephen Ferris	(substituted off) 73'
RL	5	Paul O'Connell
LL	4	Donncha O'Callaghan	(substituted off) 59'
TP	3	Mike Ross
HK	2	Rory Best	(substituted off) 53'
LP	1	Cian Healy	(substituted off) 73'
Replacements:
HK	16	Seán Cronin	(substituted on) 53'
PR	17	Tom Court	(substituted on) 73'
LK	18	Leo Cullen	(substituted on) 59'
N8	19	Denis Leamy	(substituted on) 73'
SH	20	Eoin Reddan	(substituted on) 74'
FH	21	Johnny Sexton	(substituted on) 67'
WG	22	Andrew Trimble	(substituted on) 74'
Coach:
Declan Kidney

FB	15	Andrea Masi
RW	14	Tommaso Benvenuti
OC	13	Gonzalo Canale
IC	12	Gonzalo García
LW	11	Mirco Bergamasco
FH	10	Luciano Orquera	(substituted off) 41'
SH	9	Fabio Semenzato	(substituted off) 57'
N8	8	Sergio Parisse (c)	(substituted off) 77'
OF	7	Mauro Bergamasco	(substituted off) 49'
BF	6	Alessandro Zanni
RL	5	Corniel van Zyl	(substituted off) 61'
LL	4	Quintin Geldenhuys
TP	3	Martin Castrogiovanni	(substituted off) 37'
HK	2	Leonardo Ghiraldini	(substituted off) 67'
LP	1	Salvatore Perugini
Replacements:
HK	16	Fabio Ongaro	(substituted on) 67'
PR	17	Andrea Lo Cicero	(substituted on) 37'
LK	18	Marco Bortolami	(substituted on) 61'
FL	19	Paul Derbyshire	(substituted on) 49'
SH	20	Edoardo Gori	(substituted on) 57'
FH	21	Riccardo Bocchino	(substituted on) 41'
FB	22	Luke McLean	(substituted on) 77'
Coach:
(South Africa) Nick Mallett

Man of the Match:
Seán O'Brien (Ireland)

Touch judges:
Bryce Lawrence (New Zealand)
Chris Pollock (New Zealand)
Television match official:
Shaun Veldsman (South Africa)
