= Travkin =

Travkin (Russian: Травкин) is a Russian family name, derived from the word travka, a diminutive for trava, 'grass'. Its feminine counterpart is Travkina. Notable people with the name include:

- Nikolay Travkin, Russian politician
- Alexei Travkin, Russian rugby player
- Ivan Travkin, Soviet submarine commander
