= 2006 Russian Professional Rugby League season =

2006 Professional Rugby League season
- Countries: Russia
- Champions: VVA-Podmoskovye Monino

This was the second season of the new Russian Professional Rugby League,

== Final league table ==
Pos	Team	Pld	W	D	L	PF	PA	PD	Pts
1	VVA-Podmoskovye Monino	12	10	1	1	357	141	+216	43
2	Yenisey-STM Krasnoyarsk	12	10	0	2	388	138	+250	42
3	Krasny Yar Krasnoyarsk	12	9	1	2	381	164	+217	40
4	Slava Moscow	12	5	1	6	245	235	+10	28
5	RC Penza	12	3	0	9	155	303	−148	21
6	RC Novokuznetsk	12	2	1	9	156	324	−168	19
7	Universitet Chita	12	1	0	11	161	540	−379	15

== Play-offs ==
2006 Russian Professional League Play-offs
Home	Score	Away
Semi-Finals (Two-Legged Matches with Aggregate Score Winning)
Slava Moscow	26-76	VVA-Podmoskovye Monino
Krasny Yar Krasnoyarsk	49-36	Yenisy-STM Krasnoyarsk
Finals (Best of 3 Match Series)
3rd Place Play-off Final
Slava Moscow	1-2	Yenisy-STM Krasnoyarsk
Championship Final
VVA-Podmoskovye Monino	2-0	Krasny Yar Krasnoyarsk
