= 2020–21 Rugby Europe International Championships =

- Date: 6 March 2021 – 18 December 2021
- Countries: 6

Tournament statistics
- Champions: Championship; Georgia (13)
- Antim Cup: Georgia (14th title)
- Matches played: 15
- Attendance: 30,339 (2,023 per match)
- Tries scored: 96 (6.4 per match)
- Top point scorer(s): (Portugal) Samuel Marques (74 points)
- Top try scorer(s): (Portugal) Raffaele Storti (7 tries)

The 2020–21 Rugby Europe International Championships is the European Championship for tier 2 and tier 3 rugby union nations. The 2020–21 season is the fourth of its new format and structure, where all Levels play on a one-year cycle, replacing the old format of a two-year cycle, with the teams playing each other both home and away.

For all teams competing in the Championship, this year's edition of the Rugby Europe International Championships doubles as the first year of 2023 Rugby World Cup qualifiers for the European region, where the winner and runner-up teams of the two-year cycle, automatically qualifies to the tournament as Europe 1 and Europe 2. The third team qualifies to the Final qualification tournament.

== Countries ==
Pre-tournament World Rugby rankings in parentheses.

Championship

- Georgia * (12)
- Netherlands ↑ (25)
- Portugal (20)
- Spain (17)
- Romania (19)
- Russia (21)

Legend:
* Champion of 2019–20 season; ↑ Promoted from lower division during 2019–20 season;

== 2021 Rugby Europe Championship ==
Champions

Pos.	Team	Games				Points			Tries			TBP	LBP	GS	Table points
Pos.	Team	Played	Won	Drawn	Lost	For	Against	Diff	For	Against	Diff	TBP	LBP	GS	Table points
1	Georgia	5	5	0	0	153	73	+80	22	6	+16	3	0	1	24
2	Romania	5	3	0	2	136	104	+32	16	9	+7	1	1	0	14
3	Portugal	5	3	0	2	196	139	+57	25	20	+5	1	1	0	14
4	Russia	5	2	0	3	97	142	−45	11	18	−7	1	0	0	9
5	Spain	5	2	0	3	164	109	+55	21	14	+7	2	2	0	7*
6	Netherlands	5	0	0	5	73	252	−179	10	38	−28	0	0	0	0
Source - Points were awarded to the teams as follows: Win – 4 points | Draw – 2 points | At least 3 more tries than opponent – 1 point | Loss within 7 points – 1 point | Completing a Grand Slam – 1 point * deducted points

Matches

6 March 2021
15:00 MSK (UTC+03)

Russia	18–13	Romania (1 LBP)
	Report

Fisht Stadium, Sochi
Attendance: 2,895
Referee: Shota Tevzadze (Georgia)

6 March 2021
15:00 WET (UTC+00)

Portugal	16–29	Georgia (1 TBP)
	Report

Estádio Nacional, Lisbon
Attendance: 0
Referee: Gianluca Gnecchi (Italy)

13 March 2021
13:00 WET (UTC+00)

(1 LBP) Portugal	27–28	Romania
	Report

Estádio Nacional, Lisbon
Attendance: 30
Referee: Luc Ramos (France)

14 March 2021
12:45 CET (UTC+01)

(1 LBP) Spain	19–25	Georgia
	Report

Estadio Nacional Complutense, Madrid
Attendance: 0
Referee: Pierre Brousset (France)

20 March 2021
13:00 KALT (UTC+02)

Russia	6–23	Georgia (1 TBP)
	Report

Kaliningrad Stadium, Kaliningrad
Attendance: 9,500
Referee: Andrea Piardi (Italy)

20 March 2021
15:00 EET (UTC+02)

Romania	22–16	Spain (1 LBP)
	Report

Stadionul Steaua II, Bucharest
Attendance: 50
Referee: Nika Amashukeli (Georgia)

27 March 2021
16:00 WET (UTC+00)

Portugal	43–28	Spain
	Report

Estádio de Rugby Jamor, Lisbon
Attendance: 0
Referee: Ludovic Cayre (France)

28 March 2021
15:00 GET (UTC+04)

Georgia	28–17	Romania
	Report

Mikheil Meskhi Stadium, Tbilisi
Attendance: 8,000
Referee: Paulo Duarte (Portugal)

26 June 2021
17:00 GET (UTC+04)

(1 TBP) Georgia	48–15	Netherlands
	Report

Caucasus Arena, Telavi
Attendance: 700
Referee: Alexandru Ionescu (Romania)

10 July 2021
15:00 CEST (UTC+02)

Netherlands	28–61	Portugal (1 TBP)
	Report

NRCA Stadium, Amsterdam
Attendance: 1,600
Referee: Aled Evans (Wales)

17 July 2021
13:30 MSK (UTC+03)

Russia	26–49	Portugal
	Report

Nizhny Novgorod Stadium, Nizhny Novgorod
Attendance: 5,500
Referee: Ben Blain (Scotland)

6 November 2021
15:00 CET (UTC+01)

Netherlands	8–35	Russia (1 TBP)
	Report

NRCA Stadium, Amsterdam
Attendance: 2,000
Referee: Keith Allen (Scotland)

13 November 2021
17:30 EET (UTC+02)

(1 TBP) Romania	56–15	Netherlands
	Report

Arcul de Triumf Stadium, Bucharest
Attendance: 0
Referee: Peter Martin (Ireland)

14 November 2021
12:45 CET (UTC+01)

(1 TBP) Spain	49–12	Russia
	Report

Estadio Nacional Complutense, Madrid
Attendance: 5,000
Referee: Ben Breakspear (Wales)

18 December 2021
14:00 CET (UTC+01)

Netherlands	7–52	Spain (1 TBP)
	Report

NRCA Stadium, Amsterdam
Attendance: 0
Referee: Eoghan Cross (Ireland)
