= Karolis Navickas =

Lithuanian rugby player (born 1990)

- Born: Karolis Navickas; 9 April 1990 (age 36) Šiauliai, Lithuania
- Height: 2.02 m (6 ft 7 1/2 in)
- Weight: 115 kg (18 st 2 lb; 254 lb)

Rugby union career
- Position: Lock
- Current team: US Bressane
Youth career
- RC Vairas
Senior career
Years	Team	Apps	(Points)
- RC Vairas
-2009	Sharks Academy		
2009-2010	VVA		
2010–2011	Sale Sharks		
2012–2013	Union Bordeaux Bègles	6	(0)
2013-2014	Krasny Yar	8	(5)
2014-2017	Provence Rugby	65	(15)
2017-2019	US Bressane	32	(20)

Karolis Navickas (born 9 April 1990 in Šiauliai, Lithuania) is a retired Lithuanian rugby union player who played for US Bressane in French Rugby Pro D2 and the Lithuanian national team.

== Early career ==
Navickas has played rugby professionally at home in Lithuania and abroad, notably in France. Since leaving his native Lithuania where he was part of the Lithuanian championship winning side RC Vairas, has also played in Russia with VVA, having previously taken part of the South African Sharks Under 21s side, where he stayed for a season before his European return. After his spell in Russia, he played for the Sale Sharks reserve XV.

In March 2012 he signed a 2-year contract with French Top 14 side Union Bordeaux Bègles. At the end of the 2012-2013 season he joined the Russian team of Krasny Yar.

In the 2016–2017 season he played for Provence Rugby. In 2019, Navickas retired from professional rugby after his team Bressane was relegated.
