= Vladimir Podrezov =

Russian rugby union player

- Born: 27 January 1994 (age 32) Kaliningrad
- Height: 1.85 m (6 ft 1 in)
- Weight: 122 kg (19 st 3 lb; 269 lb)

Rugby union career
- Position: Prop
- Current team: Dynamo Moscow
Senior career
Years	Team	Apps	(Points)
2012–2021	VVA Podmoskovye		
2021	London Irish		
2021–2022	VVA Podmoskovye		
2022–2025	Lokomotiv Penza		
2025–	Dynamo Moscow		
- Correct as of 1 December 2025
International career
Years	Team	Apps	(Points)
2015–present	Russia	36	(5)
- Correct as of 30 June 2023

Vladimir Podrezov (born 27 January 1994) is a Russian rugby union player for RC Dynamo Moscow in Premiership Rugby. He generally plays as a prop and represented Russia internationally.

He was included in the Russian squad for the 2019 Rugby World Cup which is scheduled to be held in Japan for the first time and also marks his first World Cup appearance. Made two appearances, without scoring.

== Career ==
He made his international debut for Russia against Namibia on 11 July 2015.

In April 2021, it was confirmed that he had signed a short-term contract with Premiership Rugby side London Irish for the remainder of the 2020–21 season. However, already in July 2021 it was announced that Vladimir would return to Russia. He did not play a single match for the London club.

On 1 July 2022 he signed a two-year contract with the club "Lokomotov Penza". In the 2022/2023 season he became Russian champion together with Penza. After the championship season the media reported that Podrezov had signed a contract with "Krasny Yar". However, the management of Yar stated that at the same time Vladimir had extended his contract with Lokomotiv-Penza and they withdrew their offer.

On 1 December 2025 he joined Moscow club Dynamo.
