= Igor Klyuchnikov =

- Born: 7 January 1983 (age 43) Moscow (Russian Federation)
- Height: 6 ft 2 in (1.88 m)
- Weight: 198 lb (90 kg)

Rugby union career
- Position(s): Wing, Fullback
International career
Years	Team	Apps	(Points)
2003-	Russia	69	(96)

Igor Kluchnikov (Russian: Игорь Ключников) (born 7 January 1983) is a Russian rugby union player. He is a tall, strong back who can play as both full back and winger.

He plays for VVA-Podmoskovye Monino. He has 69 caps for Russia, since 2003, with 6 tries, 12 conversions and 14 penalties scored, 96 points on aggregate. He was part of the Russian squad for the 2011 Rugby World Cup in New Zealand. He gained his 50th cap in Russia's World Cup opener against USA on 15 September 2011. He played in two games, without scoring. He was a key player for the Russia team that lost the 2015 Rugby World Cup qualification in the repechage.
