= Sergey Popov (rugby union) =

Sergey Viktorovich Popov (Russian: Сергей Викторович Попов) (born Moscow, 7 September 1982) is a former Russian rugby union player and a current coach. He played as a prop.

He played all his career at Slava Moscow, from 2000 to 2016, finishing it after a serious injury. He never became champion but he managed to reach the 2nd place in 2008 at the Russian Championship.

He had 24 caps for Russia, from 2003 to 2012, without ever scoring. He had his first game at the 27-13 win over Czech Republic, at 14 June 2003, in Prague, for the Six Nations B. He was called for the 2011 Rugby World Cup, where he played in three games. He had his last game at the 33-9 loss to Argentina Jaguars, at 17 June 2012, in Bucharest, for the IRB Nations Cup.

After finishing his player career, he became forwards coach at Slava Moscow.
