= Dmitry Gerasimov (rugby union) =

Russian rugby union player

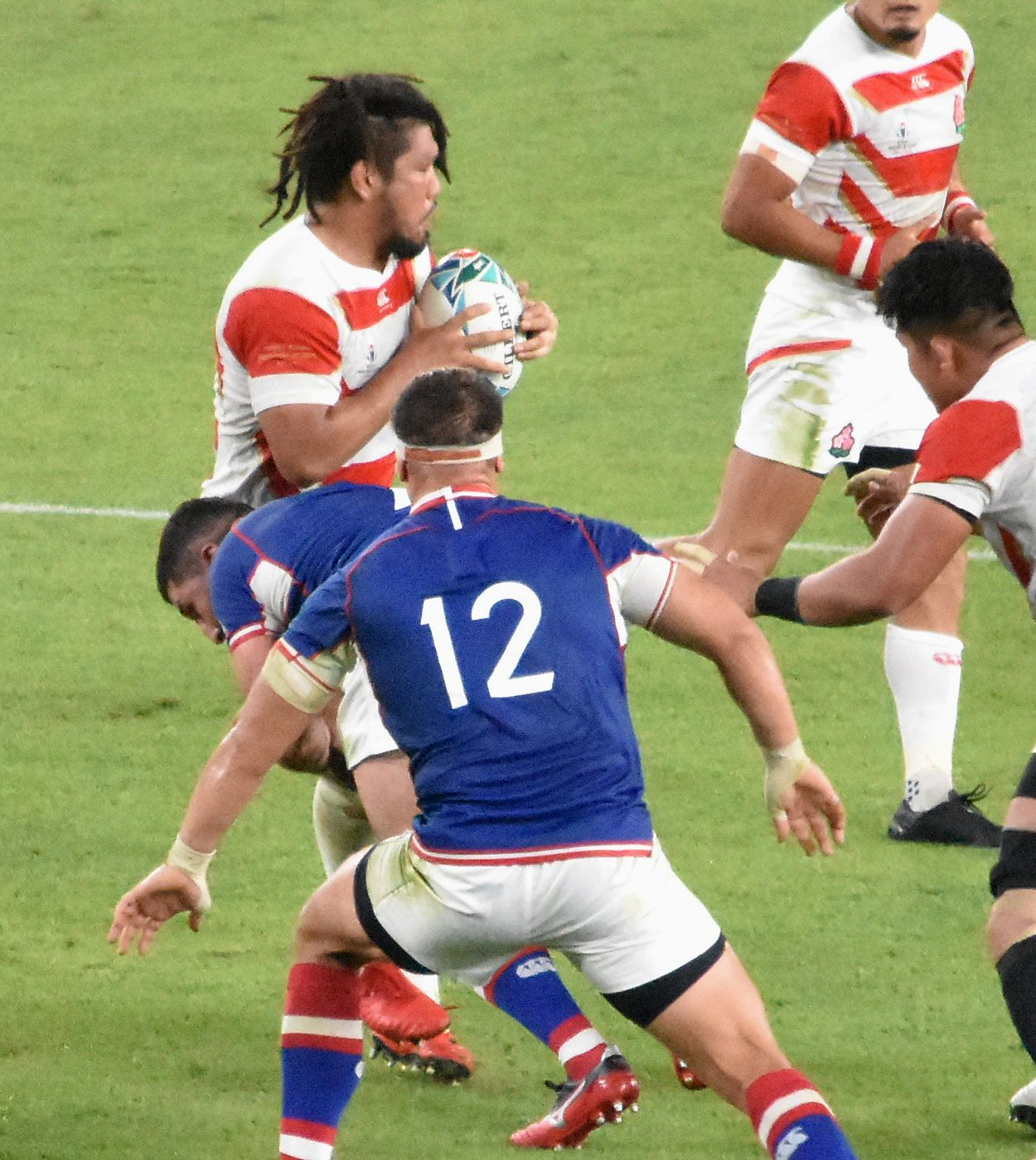
- Born: 16 April 1988 (age 38) Krasnoyarsk
- Height: 1.85 m (6 ft 1 in)
- Weight: 100 kg (15 st 10 lb; 220 lb)

Rugby union career
- Position: Centre
- Current team: Enisey–STM
Senior career
Years	Team	Apps	(Points)
2007–present	Enisey–STM		
- Correct as of 9 September 2019
International career
Years	Team	Apps	(Points)
2008–present	Russia	72	(50)
- Correct as of 1 January 2022

Dmitry Gerasimov also spelled as Dmitri Gerasimov (born 16 April 1988) is a Russian rugby union player who generally plays as a centre represents Russia internationally.

He was included in the Russian squad for the 2019 Rugby World Cup which is scheduled to be held in Japan for the first time and also marks Dmitry's first World Cup appearance despite making his international debut in 2008.

== Career ==
Dmitry made his international debut for Russia against Spain on 8 November 2008. He is currently playing for Enisey-STM club since 2007. In the European Rugby Challenge Cup he has 4 tries in 22 matches.

Honours

- Russian Championships (9): 2011, 2012, 2014, 2016, 2017, 2018, 2019, 2020-21, 2021-22
- Russian Cup (7): 2009, 2014, 2016, 2017, 2020, 2021, 2022
- Russian Supercup (3): 2014, 2015, 2017
- European Rugby Continental Shield (2): 2016-17, 2017-18
