= Mikhail Babaev =

Russian rugby union player

- Born: January 19, 1986 Moscow, Russia
- Height: 5 ft 11 in (180 cm)
- Weight: 176 lb (80 kg; 12 st 8 lb)

Rugby union career
- Position(s): Wing, Centre
International career
Years	Team	Apps	(Points)
2006-	Russia	67	(35)

Mikhail Babaev (born Moscow, 19 January 1986) is a Russian rugby union player. He plays as a wing and as a centre.

Babaev plays for VVA-Podmoskovye Monino, known as VVA Saracens, since 2003, in Russia.

He has 57 caps for Russia, since 2006, with 4 tries, 20 points on aggregate. He was called for the 2011 Rugby World Cup, playing in two games and remaining scoreless. He has been a regular player for the Russia team in the recent years, having played for the 2015 Rugby World Cup qualifyings, lost in repechage to Uruguay.
