= Mikhail Sidorov (rugby union) =

Russian rugby union player (born 1986)

Mikhail Yuryevich Sidorov (born Moscow, 19 November 1986) is a Russian rugby union player who plays as a flanker.

He played for Slava Moscow. He went on loan to Yenisey-STM Krasnoyarsk in October 2015, so he could play at the European Rugby Challenge Cup.

He had 6 caps for Russia, from 2011 to 2016, scoring 1 try, 5 points on aggregate. He was called for the 2011 Rugby World Cup, playing in two games without scoring.
