= Andrei Bykanov =

Russian rugby union player

Andrei Nikolaevich Bykanov (born Moscow, 25 May 1980) is a Russian rugby union player. He plays as a scrum-half.

Bykanov plays for Slava Moscow, in the Rugby Premier League.

He had 9 caps for Russia, from 2003 to 2011, without ever scoring. He had his debut at the 43-34 loss to Japan, at 25 May 2003, in Tokyo, for the Super Powers Cup. He was called for the 2011 Rugby World Cup, playing a single game, at the 62-12 loss to Ireland, at 25 September 2011, in Rotorua, without scoring. That would be his last cap for his national team.
