= Ivan Prishchepenko =

Russian rugby union player and coach (born 1982)

Ivan Valerievich Prishchepenko (Russian: Иван Валерьевич Прищепенко) (born Krasnoyarsk, 26 May 1982) is a former Russian rugby union player and a current coach. He played as a prop.

He played for Krasny Yar Krasnoyarsk, where he won twice the Russian Championship, in 2011 and 2013, and three times the Cup of Russia, in 2011, 2013 and 2014. He finished his player career in 2014.

He had 38 caps for Russia, from 2003 to 2011, scoring 4 tries, 20 points on aggregate. He had his debut at the 30–21 win over United States XV, at 19 July 2003, in Krasnoyarsk, for the Super Powers Cup. He was called for the 2011 Rugby World Cup, playing in the four games and without scoring. He had his last game at the 68–22 loss to Australia, at 1 October 2011, in Nelson, at the competition.

After finishing his player career, he became coach at the juvenile categories of Krasny Yar Krasnoyarsk.
