= Sergey Trishin =

Russian rugby union player (born 1984)

Sergey Trishin (born Moscow, 12 December 1984) is a Russian rugby union player. He plays as a centre.

He played for VVA Saracens and currently plays for Enisei-STM, in the Rugby Premier League.

He has 56 caps for Russia, since 2005, with 5 tries scored, 25 points on aggregate. He had his debut at the 52-12 win over the Czech Republic, at 12 November 2005, in Krasnodar, for the Six Nations B. He was called for the 2011 Rugby World Cup, playing in a single game and without scoring. He had his final cap at the 32-27 loss to Japan, at 24 November 2018, in Gloucester, England, in a friendly game.
