= Pat Danahy =

American rugby union player

Patrick Danahy
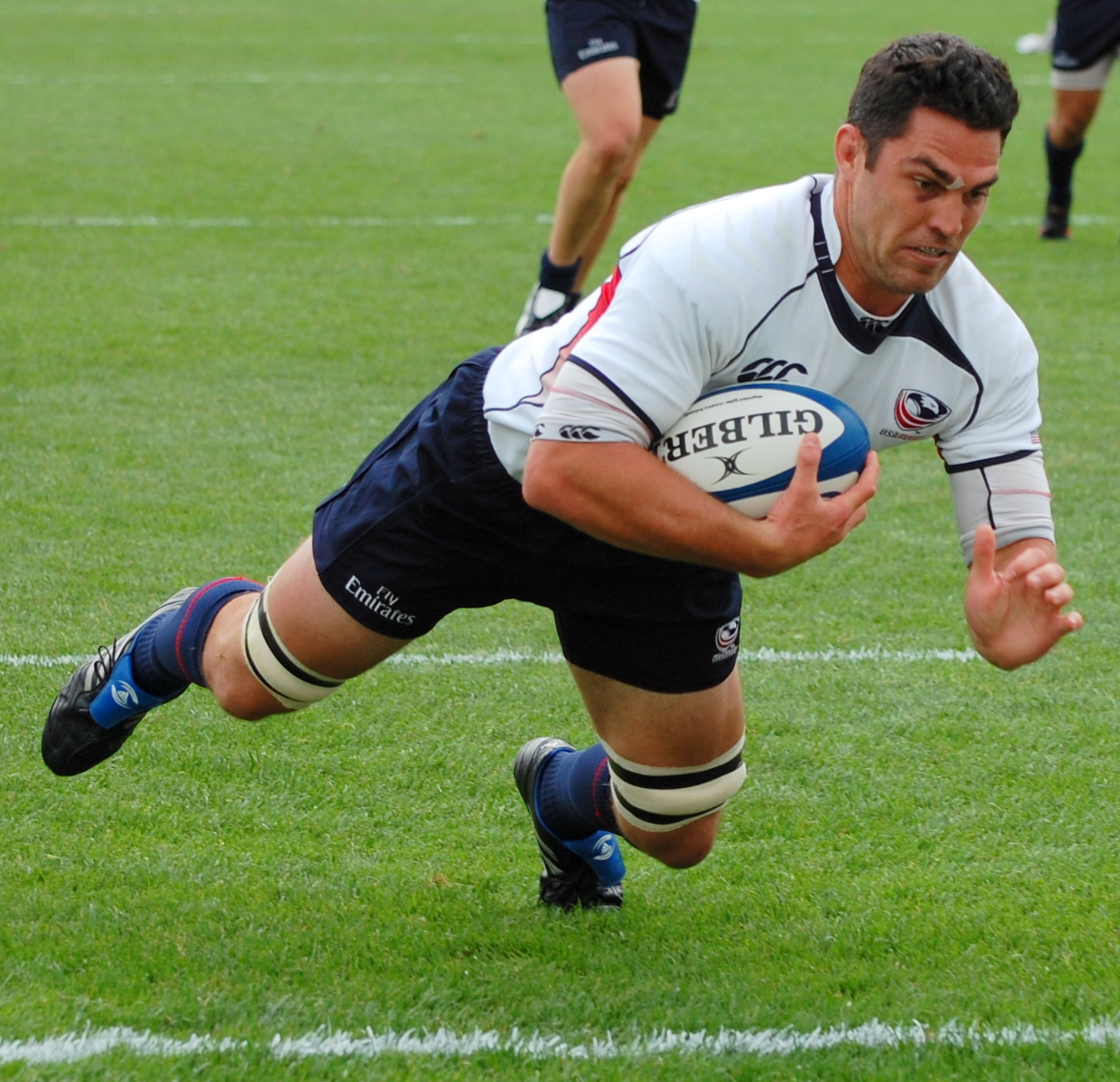
- Born: Patrick Danahy; March 7, 1985 (age 41) Baltimore, Maryland, United States
- Height: 1.93 m (6 ft 4 in)
- Weight: 111 kg (245 lb; 17.5 st)
- University: Stanford University

Rugby union career
- Position: Lock/Flank
Amateur team(s)
Years	Team	Apps	(Points)
2006–2007	Stanford		
2008–2009	Dublin University Football Club		
2010–2011	Life University		
2016–2025	Mosman Rugby Club		
International career
Years	Team	Apps	(Points)
2010–2011	United States	6	(10)
- Correct as of 31 December 2020

Patrick Danahy (born March 7, 1985) is a former American rugby union player. Danahy played both the lock and flanker positions. He currently plays for the Mosman Whales in NSW, Australia. He was selected to tour with the USA national rugby union team, the USA Eagles XV, for the Autumn 2010 tour of Europe. Patrick's debut game for his country was at the U21 level on 21 June 2007 against Canada, only six months after he first stepped onto the rugby pitch at his alma mater of Stanford University. He earned a spot on the 30 man roster for the 2011 Rugby World Cup. Though he was forced to sit out the first final following a third yellow card in the competition, Danahy and the Mosman Whales won the 2016 and 2019 Kentwell Cups in the NSW Suburban Rugby competition during his tenure as captain.
