= Artem Fatakhov =

Russian rugby union player

Artem Faridovich Fatakhov (Russian: Артём Фаридович Фатахов) (born Penza, 8 September 1979) is a Russian rugby union player. He plays as a lock. He also had a brief stint as a rugby league player.

He played for Imperia-Dynamo Penza, from 2000/01 to 2001/02, and for Yenisey-STM Krasnoyarsk, from 2002/03 to 2009/10. He has been playing for VVA Saracens, first from 2010/11 to 2012/13, and since 2014/15. He stayed a season at Strela-Agro Kazan, in 2013/14. He played rugby league briefly for Penza, in 2003.

He had 68 caps for Russia, from 2005 to 2015, scoring 1 try, 5 points on aggregate. He had his debut at the 52-17 win over Czech Republic, at 12 November 2005, in Krasnodar, for the Six Nations B. He was called for the 2011 Rugby World Cup, playing in all the four games, one of them as a substitute, and without scoring. He had his last cap at the 33-0 loss to Georgia, at 14 March 2015, in Tbilisi, for the Six Nations B, aged 35 years old.
