= Nikolay Nerush =

Russian rugby union coach and a former player

Nikolay Vladimirovich Nerush (Russian: Николай Владимирович Неруш) (born Moscow, 24 July 1960) is a Russian rugby union coach and a former player.

He played for VVA-Podmoskovye Monino.

He was the head coach of Russia, from November 2008 to October 2011. He led the national team to their first Rugby World Cup finals, the 2011 Rugby World Cup. Russia lost all the games, but managed to give a good reply in them, winning a bonus point at their first game, a 13-6 loss to United States, and scoring three tries at their 68-22 loss to Australia. He resigned after the tournament.

He was also at the same time the head coach of VVA-Podmoskovye Monino, which he has been since 1991.
