= Alexey Makovetskiy =

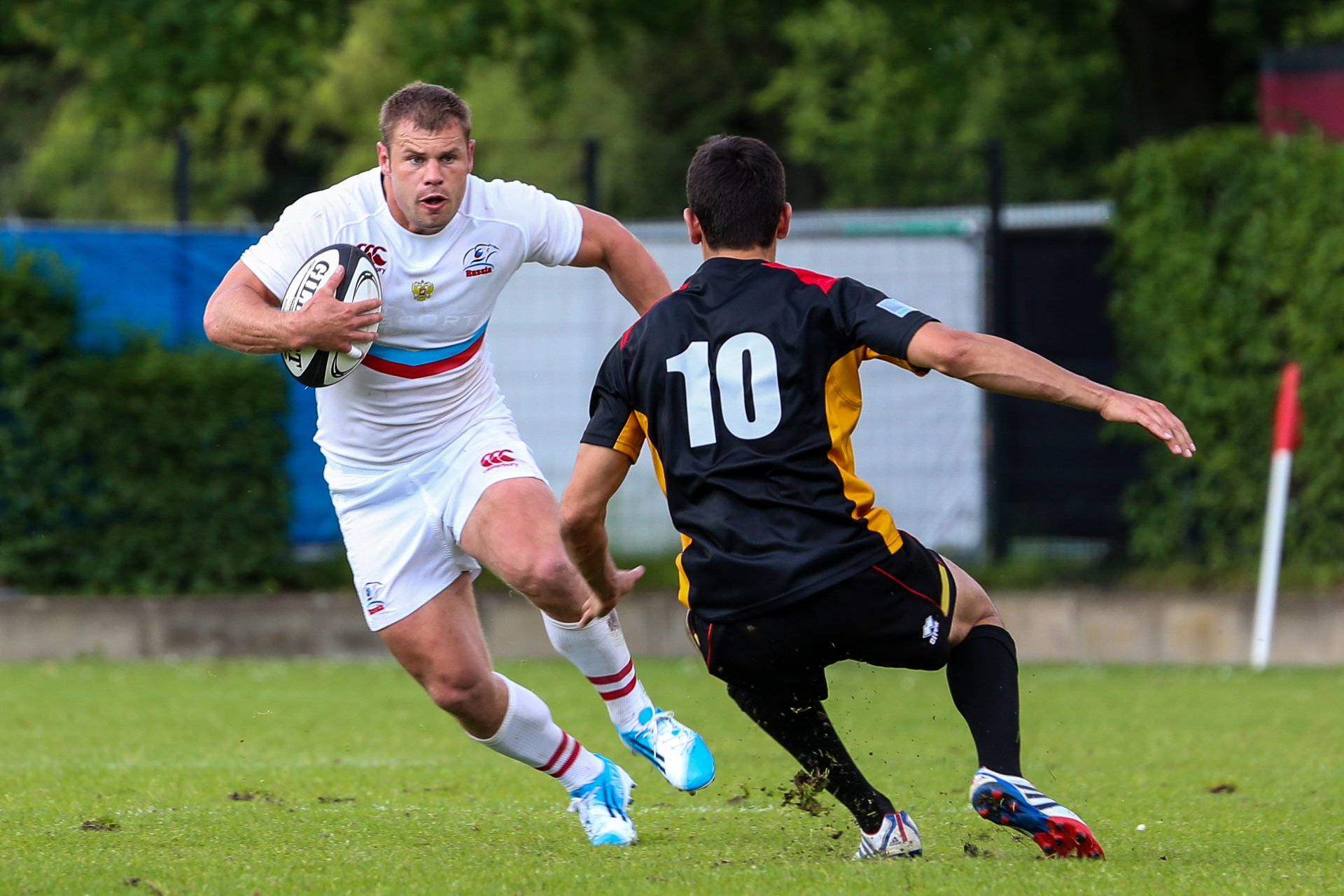
- Born: March 27, 1983 (age 43) Rostov-on-Don
- Height: 5 ft 11 in (1.80 m)
- Weight: 216 lb (98 kg)

Rugby union career
- Position: Centre
- Current team: Krasny Yar Krasnoyarsk
International career
Years	Team	Apps	(Points)
2010-2015	Russia	45	(25)

Alexey Makovetskiy (born 27 March 1983) is a Russian rugby union footballer. He plays as a fly-half.

He had 45 caps for Russia, from 2010 to 2015, scoring 5 tries, 25 points on aggregate. Makovetskiy was part of the Russian squad at the 2011 Rugby World Cup, playing in three games and scoring a try.
