= Alexander Shakirov =

- Born: Alexander Shakirov; 20 January 1981 (age 45) Ryazan, Russia
- Height: 1.72 m (5 ft 7 1/2 in)
- Weight: 75 kg (165 lb)

Rugby union career
- Position: Scrum-half
Senior career
Years	Team	Apps	(Points)
- VVA-Podmoskovje
International career
Years	Team	Apps	(Points)
2004-2014	Russia	58	(25)

Alexander Shakirov (Russian: Александр Шакиров) (born 20 January 1981) is a Russian rugby union player. He plays as a scrum-half and also as a fly-half.

He currently plays for VVA-Podmoskovye Monino, in the Russian Professional League.

Shakirov had 58 caps for Russia, with 5 tries, 25 points in aggregate, from 2004 to 2014. He was called for the 2011 Rugby World Cup, where he played in three games against United States national rugby union team, Italy national rugby union team and Australia national rugby union team. Total of 123 minutes.

His debut for Russia was the game played in Tbilisi against Georgia on 6 March 2004.
