= Adam Byrnes =

Australian-born Russian rugby union player

- Born: Adam Byrnes; 29 July 1981 (age 45) Sydney, New South Wales, Australia
- Height: 2.01 m (6 ft 7 in)
- Weight: 118 kg (18 st 8 lb; 260 lb)
- School: Newington College
- University: Sydney University

Rugby union career
- Position: Lock
Senior career
Years	Team	Apps	(Points)
2005–06	Leinster	17	(0)
2007	Sydney Fleet	7	(5)
Super Rugby
Years	Team	Apps	(Points)
2009–10	Reds	18	(5)
2011-12	Rebels	11	(0)
- Correct as of 23 July 2012
International career
Years	Team	Apps	(Points)
2011-12	Russia	6	(0)

Adam Byrnes (born 29 July 1981 in Sydney, New South Wales) is an Australian immigration lawyer and principal at Visa & Citizenship Lawyers, an immigration law firm. He was previously an Australian-born Russian international rugby union player.

== Rugby career ==
Byrnes played rugby at Newington College (1987–99). He played club rugby for Eastern Suburbs Rugby Union in Sydney. Byrnes played for Leinster Rugby in the Celtic League and Heineken Cup for two seasons from 2005. Byrnes played for Sydney Fleet in the inaugural season of the Australian Rugby Championship in 2007. Byrnes played for the Queensland Reds in the Super Rugby Competition for two seasons from 2009. Byrnes then played for the Melbourne Rebels in the Super Rugby Competition for two seasons from 2011. Byrnes played in the 2011 Rugby World Cup for Russia against USA, Italy, Ireland and his country of birth, Australia. In mid-2012 Byrnes played his last game of rugby against Uruguay with his Russian comrades in the IRB Nations Cup. Byrnes's position was lock, his play was described as abrasive, and he was relied upon to be the team enforcer.

== Business career ==
Byrnes completed his University studies after his rugby career and he is now an Australian immigration lawyer, and principal at Visa & Citizenship Lawyers.

== Personal life ==
Byrnes is an avid fisherman. In 2011, Byrnes attended the wedding of Albert II, Prince of Monaco, and Charlene Wittstock.
