= Denis Antonov =

Russian rugby union player

Denis Vladmirovich Antonov
- Born: 17 September 1986 (age 40) Dolgoprudny, Moscow, Russia
- Height: 1.95 m (6 ft 5 in)
- Weight: 97.9 kg (216 lb)

Rugby union career
- Position: Lock
Senior career
Years	Team	Apps	(Points)
2010–2022	Slava Moscow		
International career
Years	Team	Apps	(Points)
2011–2016	Russia	28	(20)
- Correct as of 25 March 2019

Denis Vladmirovich Antonov (Russian: Денис Владимирович Антонов) (born Dolgoprudny, Moscow, 17 September 1986) is a former Russian rugby union player. He played as a lock for Slava Moscow.

He had 28 caps for Russia, since 2011, with 4 tries scored, 20 points on aggregate. He had his debut at the 24-19 loss to Italy A, at 12 June 2011, in Gloucester, England, for the 2011 Churchill Cup. He was called for the 2011 Rugby World Cup, playing in three games, one of them as a substitute, without scoring. He had his most recent cap at the 25-0 loss to the United States, at 25 June 2016, in Sacramento, in a tour. He had been absent from the national team since then.
