= Konstantin Rachkov =

Russia international rugby union player

- Born: October 8, 1978 (age 48) Almaty, Kazakhstan
- Height: 5 ft 9 in (1.75 m)
- Weight: 197 lb (89 kg)

Rugby union career
- Position: Fly-half
- Current team: Bulava Taganrog
International career
Years	Team	Apps	(Points)
1997–2011	Russia	44	(316)

Konstantin Rachkov (Russian: Константин Рачков; born 8 October 1978) is a Russian rugby union footballer who plays as a fly-half.

He played in France for US Montauban (2001/02-2003/04), Stade Aurillacois Cantal Auvergne (2004/05), Lyon OU (2005/06), Tarbes Pyrénées Rugby (2006/07), Avenir Valencien (2007/08), Provence Rugby (2008/09-2009/10) and Rugby Club Stade Phocéen (2010/11-2011/12). He returned to Russia to play for Bulava Taganrog in 2012/13.

He was one of the leading players and top scorers for Russia, from 1997 to 2011, with 44 caps and 10 tries, 51 conversions, 36 penalties and 10 drop goals, 316 points on aggregate. Rachkov was part of the Russian squad at the 2011 Rugby World Cup. He played in all the four games, scoring 1 try, 4 conversions, 1 penalty and 1 drop goal, 19 points on aggregate. He left the National Team after the competition.
