= Viacheslav Grachev =

Russian rugby union player (born 1973)

- Born: 22 April 1973 (age 53) Tashkent, Soviet Union
- Height: 6 ft 3 in (1.91 m)
- Weight: 238 lb (108 kg; 17.0 st)

Rugby union career
- Position: Number 8
Senior career
Years	Team	Apps	(Points)
1987–1991	Zvezda Tashkent		
1992–1993	Empils Rostov on Don		
1994–1995	Zvezda Kaliningrad		
1996–2000	Enisei-STM		
2000–2005	US Montauban	39	(25)
2005–2007	Bayonnais	46	(25)
2007–2009	Pau	33	(15)
2009–2011	Bizanos	36	
International career
Years	Team	Apps	(Points)
1993–2011	Russia	73	(90)

Viacheslav Ivanovich Grachev (Russian: Вячеслав Иванович Грачёв) (born 22 April 1973 in Tashkent, Soviet Union) is a former Russian rugby union player and a current coach. He played as a number eight.

Grachev played in France for US Montauban, Bayonne and Pau, until a severe injury who almost put an end to his career in 2008. He recovered to play for Aviron de Bizanos for the season of 2011/12.

He had 72 caps for Russia, from 1993 to 2011, scoring 17 tries, 85 points on aggregate. He was called for the 2011 Rugby World Cup, where he was the vice captain. He played in three games. He was the oldest player of the competition, aged 38 years old.
