= VVA Podmoskovye =

Russian rugby union club, based in Monino

(Russia) VVA Podmoskovye
- Full name: Rugby club VVA-Podmoskovje, Moscow region
- Founded: 1967
- Location: Monino, Russia
- Ground: Gagarin Air Force Academy stadium (Capacity: 1500)
- Chairman: Rifkat Sattarov
- Coach: Nikolay Nerush
- Captain: Vladimir Marchenko
1st kit	2nd kit

Official website
- www.vva-podmoskovje.ru

The VVA-Podmoskovye is a Russian rugby union team playing in the Professional Rugby League. The team plays at Gagarin Air Force Academy stadium in Monino, a garrison town just outside Moscow. VVA-Podmoskovye has strong links to the air force and also supplied the bulk of Russia's national team, with which they shared a head coach, Nikolai Nerush. The team had ambitious plans for the future - it lobbied hard for inclusion in the European Challenge Cup and was close to completing a 12,500-seat purpose-built rugby stadium.

VVA-Podmoskovye have won the title eight times, in 1993, 2003, 2004, 2006, 2007, 2008, 2009 and 2010. March 2011 saw two stars depart for Aviva Premiership clubs, with Moldovan international Vadim Cobîlaş joining former Russia coach Steve Diamond at Sale Sharks and Russian international Vasily Artemiev joining Northampton Saints.

== Honours ==
- USSR/Russian Championship (17): 1969, 1971, 1976, 1977, 1980, 1981, 1984, 1985, 1986, 1993, 2003, 2004, 2006, 2007, 2008, 2009, 2010.
- USSR/Russian Cup (13): 1976, 1980, 1983, 1986, 1991, 1992, 1993, 1997, 2002, 2004, 2005, 2007, 2010.

=== International honours ===
- (Lithuania) Karolis Navickas
- (Russia) Alexander Khrokin
- (Russia) Alexei Travkin
- (Russia) Vladislav Korshunov
- (Russia) Artem Fatakhov
- (Russia) Alexander Voytov
- (Russia) Evegeny Matveev
- (Russia) Victor Gresev
- (Russia) Alexander Shakirov
- (Russia) Alexander Yanyushkin
- (Russia) Mikhail Babaev
- (Russia) Sergey Trishin
- (Russia) Vasily Artemiev
- (Russia) Igor Klyuchnikov
- (Russia) Andrey Kuzin
