= Andrey Kuzin =

Russian rugby union footballer and coach

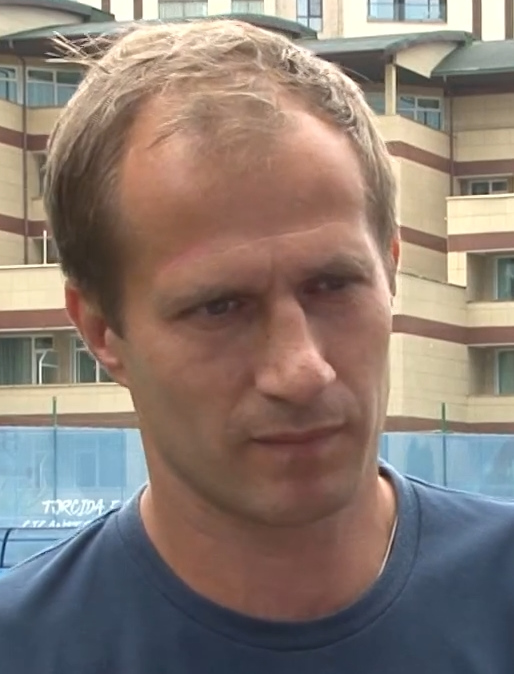
- Andrey Kuzin in 2018
- Born: 29 October 1978 (age 48) Moscow, Russia
- Height: 190 cm (6 ft 3 in)
- Weight: 88 kg (194 lb; 13 st 12 lb)

Rugby union career
- Position(s): Wing, Centre
International career
Years	Team	Apps	(Points)
1997–2011	Russia	78	(130)
National sevens team
Years	Team		Comps
- Russia
Coaching career
- Years: Team
- 2017–2021: Russia women's 7s

Andrey Vyacheslavovich Kuzin (born Moscow, 29 October 1978) is a former Russian rugby union player and a current coach. He played as wing and as a centre.

He played for VVA-Podmoskovye Monino, finishing his career in 2011/12.

He had 78 caps for Russia, from 1997 to 2011, scoring 26 tries, 130 points on aggregate. He had his debut at the 30-25 win over Tunisia, at 20 April 1997, in Tunis, for the FIRA Championship, aged 19 years old. He would be a regular for the national team in the following years. He was called for the 2011 Rugby World Cup, playing in three games and without scoring. He had his last cap at the 68-22 loss to Australia, at 1 October 2011, in Nelson, at the competition, aged 33 years old.

After finishing his playing career, he became a coach. He has been the coach of the Russia women's national rugby sevens team, winning the Rugby Sevens Grand Prix Series in 2017.
