= Victor Gresev =

Russian rugby union player

- Full name: Victor Andreevitch Gresev
- Born: 31 March 1986 (age 40) Leningrad, Soviet Union
- Height: 186 cm (6 ft 1 in)
- Weight: 108 kg (238 lb; 17 st 0 lb)

Rugby union career
- Position: Backrow
- Current team: Lokomotiv Penza
Senior career
Years	Team	Apps	(Points)
2003-2011	VVA Podmoskovye	??	(??)
2011-2012	Wasps	1	(0)
2013-2021	Krasny Yar Krasnoyarsk	??	(??)
2021-2025	Lokomotiv Penza	19	(30)
- Correct as of 19 March 2024
International career
Years	Team	Apps	(Points)
2006-2021	Russia	108	(105)
- Correct as of 19 March 2024
National sevens team
Years	Team		Comps
2006-2016	Russia		
- Correct as of 19 March 2024

Victor Andreyevich Gresev (Russian: Виктор Андреевич Гресев, born 31 March 1986) is a former Russian rugby union player who played as a number eight for several clubs and the Russia national team. He played twice at the Rugby World Cup, being on the 2011 Russia squad and the 2019 Russia squad.

== Career ==
He played VVA Saracens (2009-2011), where he won the Russian Championship, in 2006, 2007, 2008 and 2009. He signed for London Wasps, where he stayed for 2011/12. Afterwards, he returned to Russia, joining Krasny Yar Krasnoyarsk, in 2012, where he plays since then. He won twice the Russian Championship, in 2013 and 2015, and twice the Cup of Russia, in 2013 and 2015.

He has 108 caps for Russia, since 2006, with 21 tries scored, 105 points on aggregate. He was called for the 2011 Rugby World Cup, playing in four games, one as substitute, and without scoring.

He was also a regular player for Russia national rugby sevens team, being twice European Champion, in 2007 and 2009.

Retired in May 2025.
