= Vladislav Korshunov =

Russia international rugby union player

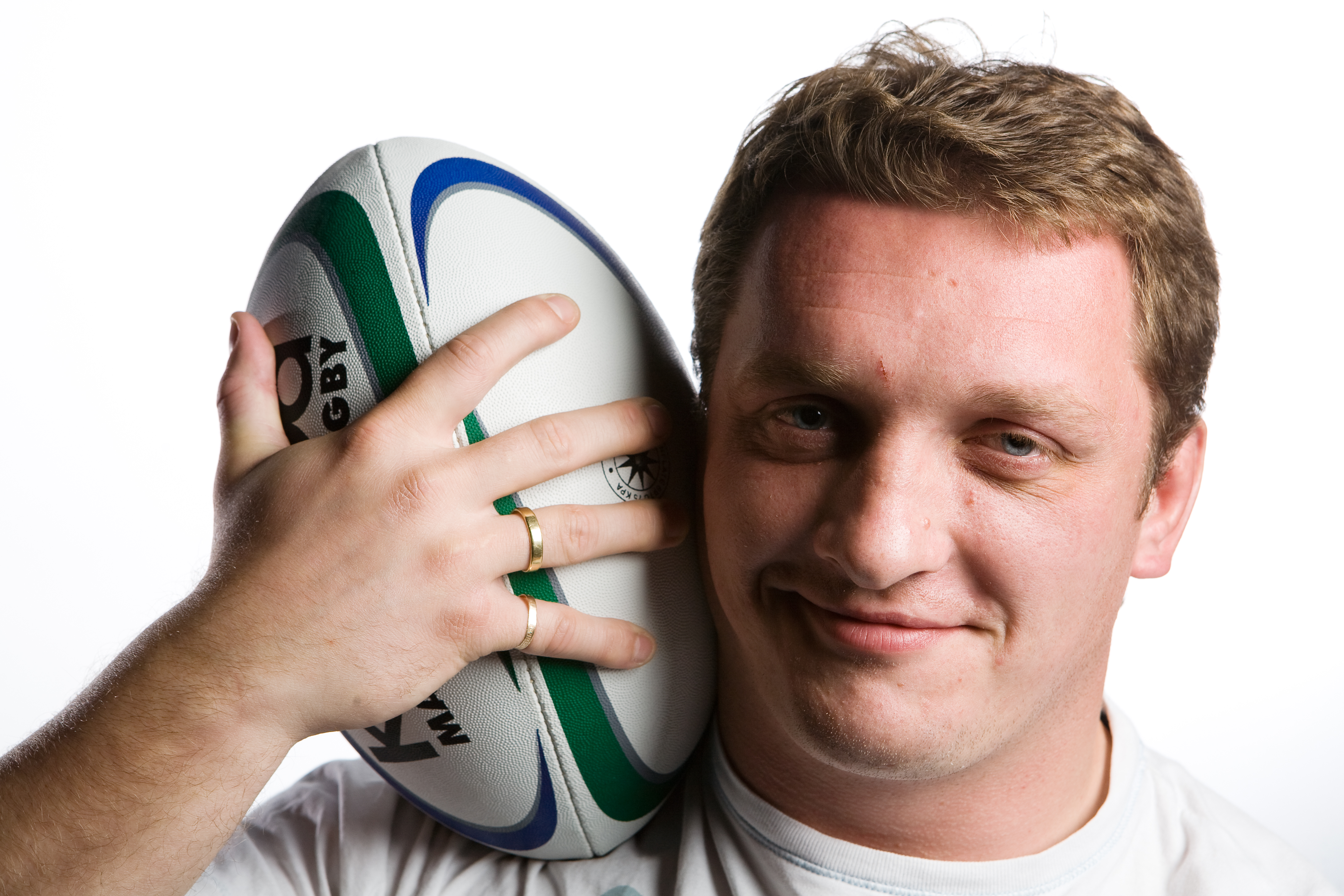
- Born: February 13, 1983 (age 43) Khabarovsk
- Height: 6 ft 0 in (1.83 m)
- Weight: 232 lb (105 kg)

Rugby union career
- Position: Hooker
Senior career
Years	Team	Apps	(Points)
...-2011	Podmoskovye		
2011-2012	London Wasps	6	
International career
Years	Team	Apps	(Points)
2002-2015	Russia	73	(25)

Vladislav Sergeevich Korshunov (Russian: Владислав Сергеевич Коршунов) (born 13 February 1983) is a Russian former rugby union player. He played as a hooker.

He played for VVA Saracens in Russia until 2010/11. He played a season for London Wasps, a professional team in England, participating as a replacement in the AVIVA Premiership and Anglo Welsh games, and as a starter in a European Challenge Cup match. However, at the end of the season it was announced that Korshunov was not going to be a part of the Wasps squad for the 2012–2013 season due to a financial accommodation. He returned to VVA Saracens for that season, where he played until 2016/17, when he finished his career.

Korshunov had 75 caps for Russia, from 2002 to 2015, with 5 tries scored, 25 points in aggregate. He was the captain of the Russia side and was a key player in the team that achieved the qualification for the 2011 Rugby World Cup, in New Zealand, for the first time.
