= Evgeny Matveev =

- Born: 15 April 1984 (age 42) Penza, Russia
- Height: 1.87 m (6 ft 2 in)
- Weight: 101.6 kg (16 st 0 lb)

Rugby union career
- Position: Hooker
Senior career
Years	Team	Apps	(Points)
- VVA Saracens

Evgeny Yuryevich Matveev (Russian: Евгений Юрьевич Матвеев) (born Penza, 15 April 1984) is a Russian rugby union player. He plays as a hooker and as a flanker.

He plays for VVA Saracens.

He has 55 caps for Russia, since 2007, with 10 tries scored, 50 points on aggregate. He was called for the 2011 Rugby World Cup, playing in two games and without scoring. He was a regular player in the Russia side that qualified for the 2019 Rugby World Cup in Japan.
