= Alexander Voytov =

Russia international rugby union player

- Born: 7 December 1981 (age 44) Krasnodar, Russia
- Height: 6 ft 6 in (198 cm)
- Weight: 235 lb (107 kg; 16 st 11 lb)

Rugby union career
- Position: Lock
- Current team: VVA Saracens
Senior career
Years	Team	Apps	(Points)
2001-2017	VVA Saracens		
International career
Years	Team	Apps	(Points)
2003-2014	Russia	73	(15)

Alexandr Voytov (born 7 December 1981) is a Russian rugby union player and former captain of the Russian national rugby union team. He played at Lock for the national team and for VVA Saracens in the Professional Rugby League in Russia.

He had 73 caps for Russia, from 2003 to 2014, scoring 3 tries, 15 points on aggregate. He made his international debut against the Czech Republic in Prague on 14 June 2003. Voytov was a member of the first Russian team to make a World Cup appearance at the 2011 Rugby World Cup in New Zealand.

He captained Russia at the 2014 IRB Nations Cup in Bucharest, Romania.

Voytov and his men were unlucky to miss the 2015 Rugby World Cup. They finished in third place at the European qualifiers but went on to beat Germany for the repechage qualifiers. They beat Zimbabwe in the preliminary round of the repechage but lost to Uruguay in the qualification round after two legs. He later stepped down after they missed out on qualifying for the World Cup.
