= Alexander Yanyushkin =

Russia international rugby union player

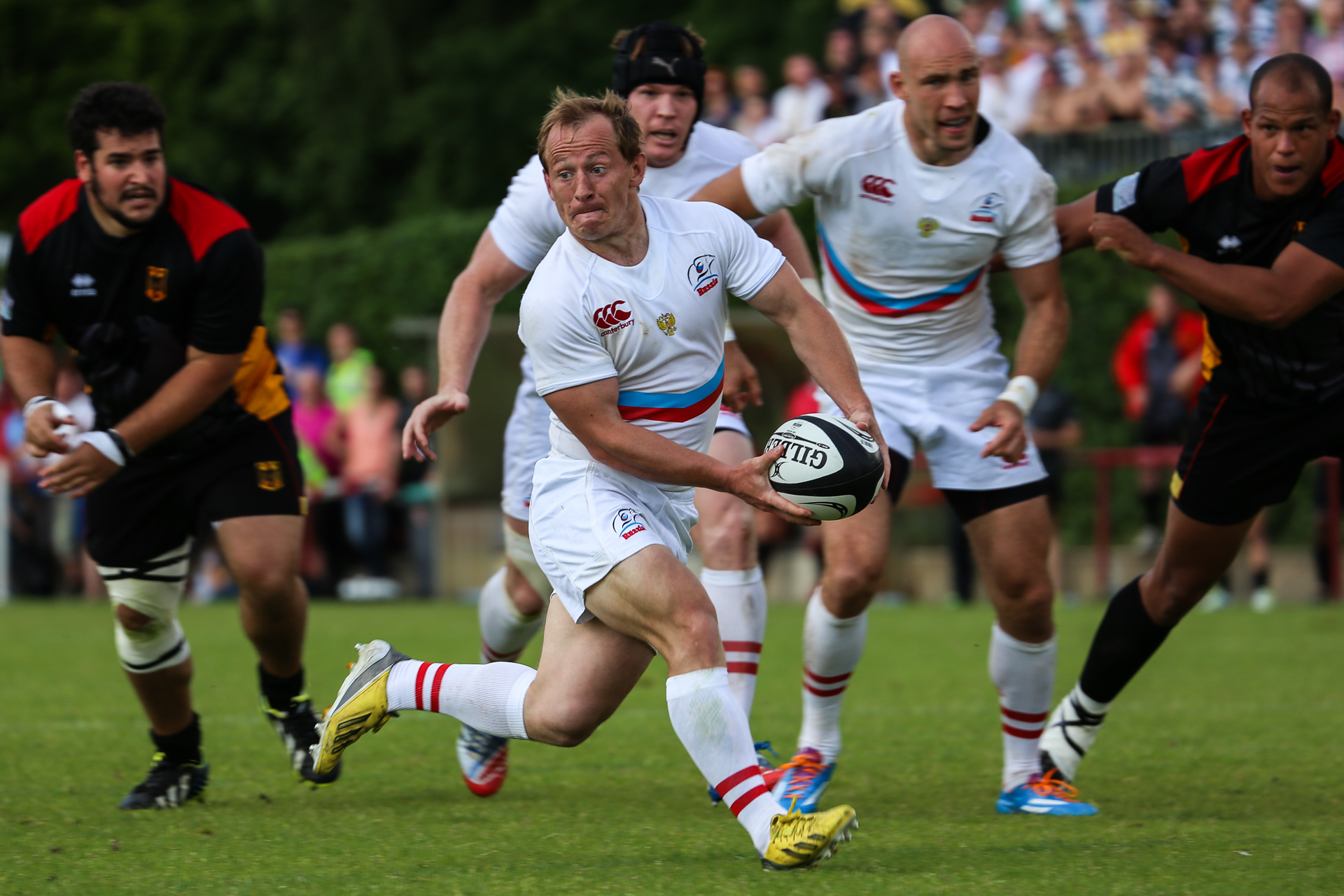
- Born: October 30, 1982 (age 44) Penza, Russia
- Height: 1.65 m (5 ft 5 in)
- Weight: 75 kg (165 lb)

Rugby union career
- Position(s): Scrum-half, Fly-half
Senior career
| Years | Team | Apps | (Points) |
| 2009–2018 | VVA-Podmoskovje | | |
International career
| Years | Team | Apps | (Points) |
| 2002–2015 | Russia | 70 | (116) |
National sevens team
| Years | Team | | Comps |
| 2002–2015 | Russia 7s | | |
Coaching career
- Years: Team
- 2018–: Lokomotiv Penza
- 2019–2021: Russia 7s
- 2022–: Russia 15s (coach)

Alexander Yanyushkin (Russian: Александр Янюшкин; born 30 October 1982 in Penza) is a Russian rugby union coach and former player, he is the head coach of the Lokomotiv Penza.

He played for VVA-Podmoskovye Monino, in the Russian Professional League, since 2009/10.

Yanyshkin had 70 for Russia, from 2002 to 2015, scoring 10 tries, 9 conversions and 16 penalties scored, 116 points in aggregate. He was called for the 2011 Rugby World Cup, playing in three games and scoring a try.
