= Alexei Travkin =

Russian rugby player (born 1977)

Alexei Sergeevich Travkin (Russian: Алексей Сергеевич Травкин) (born Moscow, 2 August 1977) is a former Russian rugby union player who played as a prop.

He played for VVA-Podmoskovye Monino, known as VVA Saracens until 2016.

He had 56 caps for Russia, from 2001 to 2011, scoring 1 try, 5 points on aggregate. He was called for the 2011 Rugby World Cup, playing in two games. He left the national team after the competition.
