= Alexander Khrokin =

- Born: July 10, 1976 (age 50) Moscow
- Height: 6 ft 1 in (1.85 m)
- Weight: 252 lb (114 kg)

Rugby union career
- Position: Prop
- Current team: VVA-Podmoskovye Monino
International career
Years	Team	Apps	(Points)
1994-2011	Russia	77	(35)

Alexander Khrokin (Russian: Александр Хрокин)(born 10 July 1976) is a former Russian rugby union footballer. He played as a prop.

He played is entire career at VVA-Podmoskovye Monino, from 1994/95 to 2012/13.

He had 77 caps for Russia, from 1994 to 2011, scoring 7 tries, 35 points on aggregate. Khrokin was part of the Russian squad at the 2011 Rugby World Cup, playing in two games but without scoring.
