= Russia national rugby union team =

National rugby union team

Russia
- Nicknames: Медведи (Medvedi, Bears)
- Emblem: Russian Bear
- Union: Rugby Union of Russia
- Head coach: Aleksandr Pervukhin
- Captain: Victor Gresev
- Most caps: Yuri Kushnarev (120)
- Top scorer: Yuri Kushnarev (797)
- Top try scorer: Vasily Artemyev (29)
- Home stadium: Various
First colours	Second colours

World Rugby ranking
- Current: 32 (as of 6 January 2025)
- Highest: 16 (2007, 2008, 2009, 2010)
- Lowest: 26 (2005)

First international
- Soviet Union 28–0 Czechoslovakia (Soviet Union; 31 August 1975) as Russian Federation; Unofficial; Russia 27–23 Barbarians (Moscow, Russia; 6 June 1992); Official; Belgium 11–17 Russia (Brussels, Belgium; 11 October 1992)

Biggest win
- Denmark 7–104 Russia (Copenhagen, Denmark; 13 May 2000)

Biggest defeat
- Japan 75–3 Russia (Tokyo, Japan; 6 November 2010)

World Cup
- Appearances: 2 (first in 2011)
- Best result: Pool stage (2011, 2019)
- Website: rugby.ru

The Russia national rugby union team (Russian: Сборная России по регби), nicknamed the Bears (Russian: Медведи, romanized: medvedi), represents Russia in international men's rugby union and is administered by the Rugby Union of Russia. It is considered the successor of the Soviet Union and the CIS by World Rugby. Since 1992, the team has played as Russia.

The history of the sport in Russia goes back to the late 19th century, but a national team was not established until 1975, in the Soviet Union. The USSR took part in international competition, but declined an invitation to the inaugural 1987 Rugby World Cup for political reasons. The team's first test match as Russia was against Barbarian FC in Moscow in June 1992. The country's first test against an IRB nation was against Belgium four months later, during the 1992–1994 FIRA Trophy. That was also Russia's first participation in Rugby World Cup qualifying. Russia is seen as a Tier 2 union by World Rugby, and after the reorganization in 2000, Russia's regular international competition was the FIRA-AER European Nations Cup – often referred to as the Six Nations B. In 2017 it became known as the Rugby Europe International Championships. In addition, the team participated in World Rugby-run summer tournaments including the Nations Cup, the dormant Churchill Cup, and other international fixtures.

Russia competed in their first Rugby World Cup in 2011 in New Zealand, after qualifying as Europe 2 through their second-place finish in the 2009–2010 European Nations Cup. Russia played in Pool C and finished fifth, after losing all four matches and only getting one competition point, which was during its match with the United States. They competed in 2019 in Japan by qualifying as Europe 1 as a result of Spain, Romania and Belgium being eliminated during the 2017–2018 Rugby Europe International Championships. Playing in Pool A, Russia finished in fifth place with zero competition points. After the 2022 Russian invasion of Ukraine, World Rugby and Rugby Europe suspended Russia from international and European continental rugby union competition. In addition, the Rugby Union of Russia was suspended from World Rugby and Rugby Europe.

== History ==
=== Background and development ===
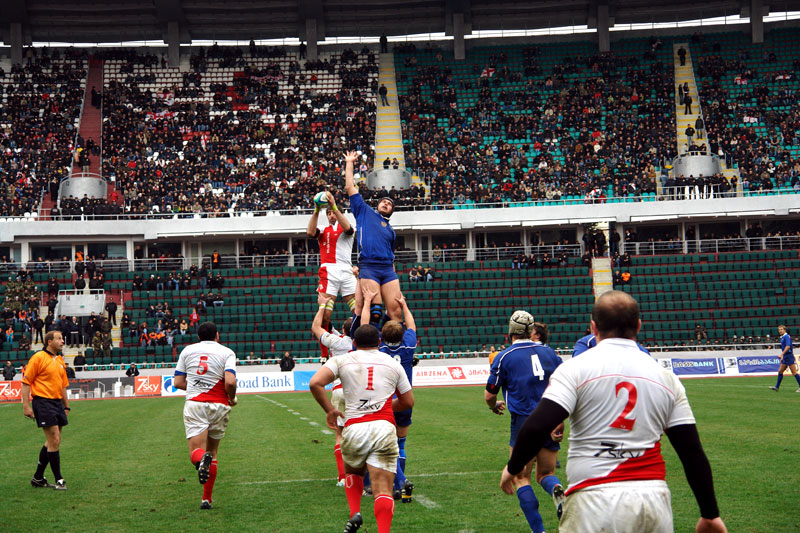
Georgia v. Russia, 24 March 2007

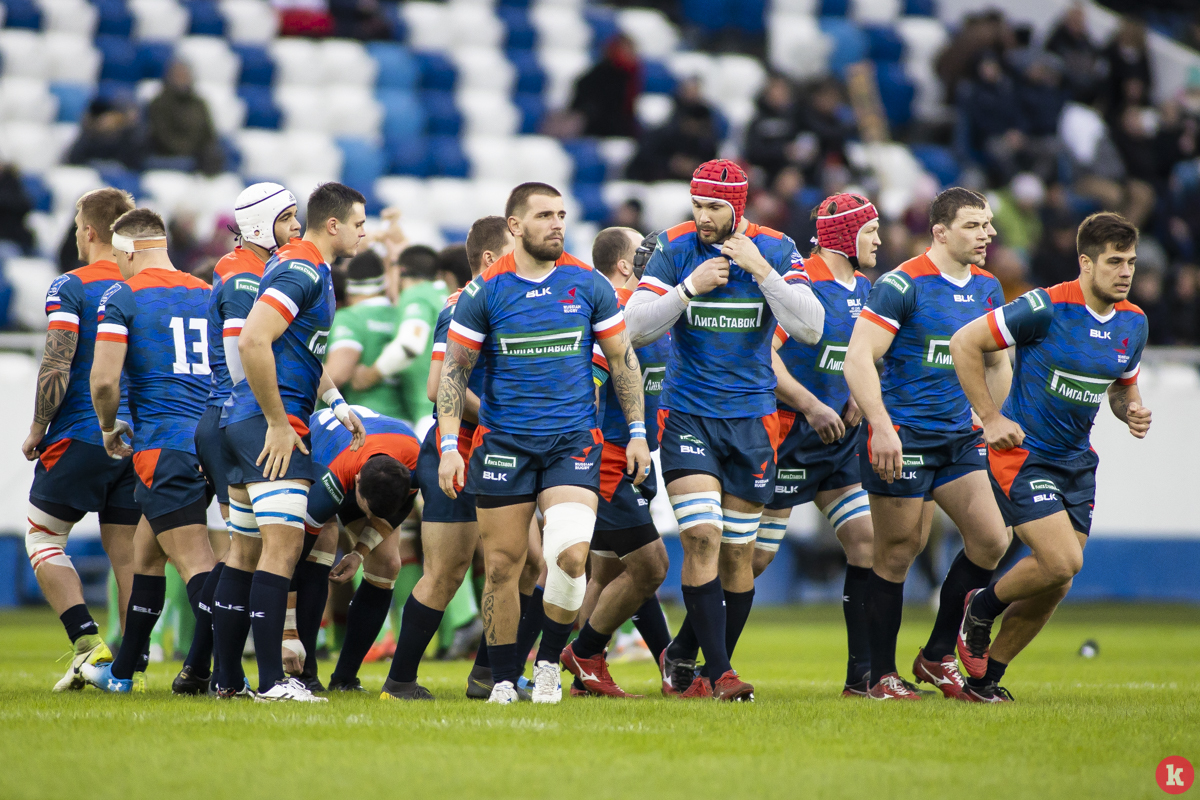
Russia v. Portugal, 22 February 2020

Rugby football was played in the Russian Empire from the late 19th century, and was the first form of football played in Russia. Rugby was later banned by the Tsarist government for its brutal nature and the possibility of inciting riots, but people continued playing it. The first official match was played in the Soviet Union in 1923. The Rugby Union of the USSR was founded in 1936, and the first All-Union championship was held that year. The effects of World War II and the temporary banning of the sport by Soviet government caused the sport to decline until the 1960s. In the early 1970s, there were over 10,000 registered players in the Soviet Union, and 20 teams in the national championship. In 1975 the Soviet Rugby Union was admitted to the International Amateur Rugby Federation (FIRA).

The Soviet Union national team took time to establish itself, but by the mid-1980s was regularly beating the likes of Italy and Romania. In 1988, the team defeated the United States by 31–16 in Moscow. The Soviet Union was invited to the inaugural 1987 Rugby World Cup, but declined on political grounds, not least the continued International Rugby Board (IRB) membership of apartheid South Africa. After the breakup of the Soviet Union, Russian players were part of the Commonwealth of Independent States team.

The first game played by the new Russian national team took place on 6 June 1992, when Russia beat Barbarian FC by 27–23. Russia's first game against a full IRB member was against Belgium four months later, as part of the 1992–1994 FIRA Trophy. This was Russia's first participation in Rugby World Cup qualifying. The tournament also saw the team secure its first win over its rival Georgia. Russia continued to participate until the realignment of FIRA-AER competitions in 2000. There was a decline in rugby union during the 1990s, when only Olympic sports continued to receive funding from the Russian government. Professional clubs in Moscow and elsewhere closed down, and the sport largely became limited to Krasnoyarsk in Siberia, the traditional heartland of Russian rugby. There was also a lack of qualified coaches and referees.

Russia is designated as a Tier 2 union, and has played its regular competitive rugby in FIRA-AER's European Nations Cup from 2000, the second level mirror tournament to the Six Nations. The team has played in the now-defunct Superpowers Cup, winning the tournament once, the Nations Cup, the Churchill Cup, and most recently the IRB's International Rugby Series. The Rugby Union of Russia attempted to gain greater participation in the autumn test window, and was being integrated into World Rugby's global test match schedule. Russia initially qualified for the 2003 Rugby World Cup by defeating Spain in the repechage, but was disqualified by the IRB for having three South Africans on the squad who were not eligible to represent Russia. The RUR claimed they were eligible by ancestry, but did not produce documentation deemed acceptable by the IRB, and Spain were re-instated in qualification in Russia's place. The team did well enough in regionals to reach a play-off with Italy for the 2007 Rugby World Cup, but lost the match.

=== First World Cup appearance (2011) ===
In 2008 the former England player and coach Steve Diamond was hired as Russia's director of rugby to assist the team with qualifying for the next World Cup. During the Europe qualification for the 2011 Rugby World Cup, Russia won against Germany, Romania, Spain, and Portugal in the 2009–2010 European Nations Cup First Division, finishing as the runners-up after a loss to Georgia. Russia's second-place finish in the European Nations Cup qualified the nation for its first World Cup appearance, as Europe 2. Russia was placed in Pool C at the 2011 World Cup in New Zealand, where they faced Ireland, Australia, the United States, and Italy. Although most did not consider Russia to be a serious contender for the World Cup, the team's goal was to try hard, make it to the World Rugby highlights reel, and use this as an opportunity to raise the popularity of the sport in their country. Russia lost their first World Cup match to the United States, but won their first World Cup competition point because they lost by a margin of less than seven points. Russia went on to lose all four matches in Pool C and finished in fifth place, with only one competition point.

Match results
Date	Opponent	Score	Venue	Source
15 Sep 2011	United States	13–6	Stadium Taranaki, New Plymouth	Report
20 Sep 2011	Italy	53–17	Trafalgar Park, Nelson	Report
25 Sep 2011	Ireland	62–12	International Stadium, Rotorua	Report
1 Oct 2011	Australia	68–22	Trafalgar Park, Nelson	Report

Pos	Team	Pld	W	D	L	PF	PA	PD	T	B	Pts	Qualification
1	Ireland	4	4	0	0	135	34	+101	15	1	17	Advanced to the quarter-finals and qualified for the 2015 Rugby World Cup
2	Australia	4	3	0	1	173	48	+125	25	3	15	Advanced to the quarter-finals and qualified for the 2015 Rugby World Cup
3	Italy	4	2	0	2	92	95	−3	13	2	10	Eliminated but qualified for 2015 Rugby World Cup
4	United States	4	1	0	3	38	122	−84	4	0	4	
5	Russia	4	0	0	4	57	196	−139	8	1	1	

=== Second World Cup appearance (2019) ===
The team's 2011 World Cup appearance, and the broadcasting in Russia of the 2003 and 2007 editions before that, led to increased interest in rugby union. However, in the years leading up to their qualification for the 2019 Rugby World Cup, Russia was only able to win a match against one World Cup contender, Canada. When Spain, Belgium, and Romania were disqualified for having had ineligible players during the 2017–2018 Europe Championships, part of the Europe qualification, Russia advanced enough in the rankings to qualify as Europe 1. Lyn Jones became the coach of the Russia squad ahead of the World Cup, and led the team during another tournament, the 2019 World Rugby Nations Cup, where they achieved wins over Namibia and Argentina XV. Russia faced host nation Japan in the opening match of the 2019 World Cup, playing in Pool A along with Ireland, Scotland, and Samoa. Kirill Golosnitsky scored the fastest ever try in a World Cup opening match, giving Russia an early lead in the first five minutes, but they went on to lose to Japan. Russia lost all four matches and finished in fifth place, with zero competition points.

Match results
Date	Opponent	Score	Venue	Source
20 Sep 2019	Japan	30–10	Tokyo Stadium, Tokyo	Report
24 Sep 2019	Samoa	34–9	Kumagaya Rugby Stadium, Kumagaya	Report
3 Oct 2019	Ireland	35–0	Kobe Misaki Stadium, Kobe	Report
9 Oct 2019	Scotland	61–0	Shizuoka Stadium Ecopa, Fukuroi	Report

Pos	Team	Pld	W	D	L	PF	PA	PD	T	B	Pts	Qualification
1	Japan	4	4	0	0	115	62	+53	13	3	19	Advanced to the quarter-finals and qualified for the 2023 Rugby World Cup
2	Ireland	4	3	0	1	121	27	+94	18	4	16	Advanced to the quarter-finals and qualified for the 2023 Rugby World Cup
3	Scotland	4	2	0	2	119	55	+64	16	3	11	Eliminated but qualified for 2023 Rugby World Cup
4	Samoa	4	1	0	3	58	128	−70	8	1	5	
5	Russia	4	0	0	4	19	160	−141	1	0	0	

=== Suspension (since 2022) ===
In 2022 World Rugby and Rugby Europe suspended Russia from international and European continental rugby union competition due to the 2022 Russian invasion of Ukraine. In addition, the Rugby Union of Russia was suspended from World Rugby and Rugby Europe.

== Team records ==
=== World Cup record ===
Rugby World Cup record									Qualification						
Year	Round	Pld	W	D	L	PF	PA	Squad	Pos	Pld	W	D	L	PF	PA
(New Zealand) (Australia) 1987	Declined invitation								–						
(England) (France) (Ireland) (Scotland) (Wales) 1991	Did not enter								–						
(South Africa) 1995	Did not qualify								2nd	4	3	0	1	125	49
(Wales) 1999	Did not qualify								P/O	4	1	0	3	85	92
(Australia) 2003	Expelled from competing at tournament after qualification								P/O	6	5	0	1	176	114
(France) 2007	Did not qualify								3rd	14	6	1	7	382	323
(New Zealand) 2011	Pool stage	4	0	0	4	57	196	Squad	2nd	10	7	1	2	291	175
(England) 2015	Did not qualify								P/O	12	7	0	5	269	300
(Japan) 2019	Pool stage	4	0	0	4	19	160	Squad	1st	8	4	0	4	226	144
(France) 2023	Disqualified								5th	10	2	0	8	159	217
(Australia) 2027	Disqualified								–						
(United States) 2031	To be determined								To be determined						
Total	—	8	0	0	8	76	356	—	—	68	33	2	33	1391	1150
Champions; Runners–up; Third place; Fourth place; Home venue

=== Europeans record ===
Years	Division	W–L (Pts Diff)	Position	Promotion / Relegation
1992–1994	Pool for Title	1–3 (–36)	4th	–
1995–1997	First Division	2–2 (–58)	3rd	–
1998–1999	Second Division	3–0 (+128)	1st	–
2000	Second Division	4–0 (+249)	1st	Promoted
2001	First Division	3–2 (+9)	3rd	—
2002	First Division	3–1–1 (+93)	3rd	—
2003	First Division	3–6 (+23)	4th	—
2004–2006	First Division	4–5 (+88)	4th	–
2006–2008	First Division	8–2 (+165)	2nd	–
2008–2010	First Division	7–1–2 (+112)	2nd	–
2010–2012	Division 1A	2–3 (+2)	4th	—
2012–2014	Division 1A	3–2 (–6)	3rd	–
2014–2016	Division 1A	6–4 (−3)	3rd	—
2017	Championship Division	2–3 (−10)	4th	—
2018	Championship Division	2–3 (+58)	2nd (Note: Romania, Belgium and Spain deducted points.)	—
2019	Championship Division	2–3 (+45)	4th	–
2020	Championship Division	2–3 (−46)	5th	—
2021	Championship Division	2–3 (−46)	5th	—
2021	Championship Division	2–3 (−46)	5th	—
2022	Championship Division	0–5 (−13)	—N/a	Suspended
2022	Suspended due to the invasion of Ukraine			
2023	Suspended due to the invasion of Ukraine			
2024	Suspended due to the invasion of Ukraine			
2025	Suspended due to the invasion of Ukraine			

=== Overall record ===
Men's World Rugby Rankings Top 30 as of 28 September 2026
Rank	Change (Note: Change from the previous week)	Team	Points
1	Steady	South Africa	93.09
2	Steady	New Zealand	91.15
3	Steady	Ireland	88.08
4	Steady	France	87.43
5	Steady	England	85.68
6	▲1	Australia	85.55
7	▼1	Scotland	84.78
8	Steady	Argentina	82.24
9	Steady	Japan	77.28
10	Steady	Fiji	76.81
11	Steady	Wales	76.38
12	Steady	Italy	76.30
13	Steady	Georgia	73.94
14	Steady	Portugal	69.39
15	Steady	United States	67.58
16	Steady	Chile	66.94
17	Steady	Spain	66.83
18	Steady	Uruguay	65.75
19	Steady	Tonga	65.14
20	Steady	Samoa	64.73
21	Steady	Romania	62.45
22	Steady	Canada	62.29
23	Steady	Belgium	61.03
24	Steady	Hong Kong	60.74
25	Steady	Zimbabwe	57.68
26	Steady	Namibia	56.96
27	Steady	Netherlands	56.44
28	Steady	Switzerland	55.47
29	Steady	Czech Republic	54.78
30	Steady	Poland	54.54

Russia's historical rankings

Source: World Rugby
Graph updated to 24 August 2026

Below is a table of the representative rugby matches played by a Russia national XV at test level up until 12 February 2022, updated after match with Spain.

Opponent	Played	Won	Lost	Drawn	Win %	For	Aga	Diff
Argentina Jaguars	5	0	5	0	0.00%	58	200	–142
Argentina XV	2	2	0	0	100%	87	78	+9
Australia	1	0	1	0	0.00%	22	68	–46
Basque Country	2	1	0	1	50.00%	52	42	–10
Belgium	8	7	1	0	87.5%	275	148	+127
Canada	5	1	4	0	20%	91	157	–66
Chile	5	1	4	0	20%	154	155	-1
Croatia	1	0	1	0	0.00%	16	23	–7
Czech Republic	8	6	2	0	75%	309	104	+205
Denmark	3	3	0	0	100%	191	28	+163
England A	1	0	1	0	0.00%	17	49	–32
France XV	2	0	2	0	0.00%	21	87	–66
(France) French Military	1	0	1	0	0.00%	12	33	–21
Georgia	25	1	23	1	4%	273	621	–348
Germany	11	11	0	0	100%	528	140	+388
Hong Kong	5	5	0	0	100%	144	62	+82
Ireland	3	0	3	0	0.00%	15	132	–117
Emerging Ireland	1	0	1	0	0.00%	0	66	–66
Italy	5	0	5	0	0.00%	76	283	–207
Emerging Italy	2	0	2	0	0.00%	36	60	–24
Italy A	4	0	4	0	0.00%	66	129	–63
Japan	7	1	6	0	14.29%	118	299	–161
Kenya	1	1	0	0	100%	31	10	+21
Morocco	3	2	1	0	66.67%	44	46	–2
Namibia	7	5	2	0	71.43%	183	141	+42
Netherlands	5	5	0	0	100%	243	47	+196
Norway	1	1	0	0	100%	66	0	+66
Papua New Guinea	1	1	0	0	100%	49	19	+30
Poland	4	4	0	0	100%	201	59	+142
Portugal	21	14	6	1	66.67%	563	429	+134
Romania	25	7	17	1	28%	375	634	–259
Samoa	1	0	1	0	0.00%	9	34	–25
Scotland	1	0	1	0	0.00%	0	61	–61
Scotland A	1	0	1	0	0.00%	7	49	–42
Spain	25	16	9	0	64%	688	608	+80
Sweden	1	0	1	0	0.00%	13	20	–7
Tunisia	2	2	0	0	100%	57	41	+16
Ukraine	9	9	0	0	100%	439	115	+324
United States	8	0	8	0	0.00%	110	280	–170
USA Selects	1	1	0	0	100%	30	21	+9
Uruguay	9	4	5	0	44.44%	215	231	–16
Zimbabwe	3	3	0	0	100%	92	35	+57
Total	232	113	116	3	48.71%	5865	5710	+155

== Individual records ==
=== Most caps ===
#	Player	Pos	Span	Mat	Start	Sub	Won	Lost	Draw	%
1	Yuri Kushnarev	Fly-half	2005–2021	120	101	19	55	63	2	47.82
2	Victor Gresev	Flanker	2006–2022	107	97	10	46	60	1	44.28
3	Andrey Garbuzov	Lock	2005–2020	100	76	24	45	54	1	45.50
4	Vasily Artemyev	Centre	2009–2022	98	94	4	41	56	1	43.68
5	Andrei Kuzin	Centre	1997–2011	78	68	10	38	37	3	50.64
6	Alexander Khrokin	Prop	1994–2011	76	47	29	36	38	2	48.68
7	Dmitry Gerasimov	Centre	2008-2022	73	63	10	29	44	0	40.84
7	Vladislav Korshunov	Hooker	2002–2015	73	48	25	32	39	2	45.20
7	Alexander Voytov	Lock	2003–2014	73	67	6	29	42	2	41.09
10	Viacheslav Grachev	Flanker	1993–2011	72	70	2	33	37	2	47.22

=== Most tries ===
#	Player	Pos	Span	Mat	Start	Sub	Pts	Tries
1	Vasily Artemyev	Centre	2009–2022	98	94	4	145	29
2	Andrei Kuzin	Centre	1997–2011	78	68	10	130	26
3	Vladimir Ostroushko	Wing	2006–2020	51	47	4	125	25
4	Victor Gresev	Flanker	2006–2022	107	97	10	110	22
5	Viacheslav Grachev	Flanker	1993–2011	72	70	2	95	19
6	Igor Galinovskiy	Wing	2006-2019	50	43	7	90	18
7	Alexander Gvozdovsky	Wing	2005-2010	31	28	3	75	15
7	Denis Simplikevich	Wing	2011-2021	30	25	5	75	15
9	Evgeny Matveev	Hooker	2007-2020	65	26	39	65	13
10	Anton Rudoy	Flanker	2016-2018	20	19	1	60	12

=== Most points ===
#	Player	Pos	Span	Mat	Pts	Tries	Conv	Pens	Drop
1	Yuri Kushnarev	Fly-half	2005–2021	120	797	11	155	142	2
2	Konstantin Rachkov	Fly-half	1997–2011	44	316	10	51	41	5
3	Ramil Gaisin	Fly-half	2012–2022	60	250	7	46	41	0
4	Vladimir Simonov	Centre	2001-2004	22	168	11	25	18	3
5	Vasily Artemyev	Centre	2009–2022	98	145	29	0	0	0
6	Andrei Kuzin	Centre	1997–2011	78	130	26	0	0	0
7	Vladimir Ostroushko	Wing	2006–2020	51	125	25	0	0	0
8	Alexander Yanyushkin	Scrum-half	2002–2015	70	116	10	9	16	0
9	Viktor Motorin	Scrum-half	1999–2009	41	112	2	24	18	0
10	Victor Gresev	Flanker	2006–2022	107	110	22	0	0	0

== Technical staff ==
The current coaching staff of the Russian national team:

Name	Nationality	Role
Aleksandr Pervukhin	Russia	Manager
Alexander Yanyushkin; Vakil Valeyev	Russia	Head coach
Yuri Kushnarev	Russia	Assistant coach
Vacant		Strength & conditioning coach
Dr. Yevgeny Trofimov	Russia	Team doctor
Vacant		Physiotherapist

=== Past coaches ===
Since 1992

- (Russia) Pyotr Etko (1992)
- (Russia) Vladimir Grachyov (1992–2000)
- (South Africa) James Stoffberg (2001–2002)
- (Russia) Aleksandr Pervukhin (2003–2004)
- (Russia) (France) Igor Mironov (2004–2005)
- (South Africa) Blikkies Groenewald (2006)
- (France) Claude Saurel (2007–2008)
- (England) Steve Diamond (Director of Rugby, 2008–2010)
- (Russia) Nikolay Nerush (2008–2011)
- (Wales) Kingsley Jones (2011–2014)
- (France) Raphaël Saint-André (interim, 2014)
- (Russia) Aleksandr Pervukhin (2015–2018)
- (Ireland) Mark McDermott (interim, 2018)
- (Wales) Lyn Jones (2018–2021)
- (South Africa) Dick Muir (2021–2022)
- (Russia) Aleksandr Pervukhin (2023–present)

== Players ==
=== Current squad ===
The following players were called up for the 2022 Rugby Europe Championship.

Head Coach: (Russia) Aleksandr Pervukhin

- Caps updated: 8 February 2022

Note: Flags indicate national union for the club/province as defined by World Rugby.

Player	Position	Date of birth (age)	Caps	Club/province
Shamil Davudov	Hooker	25 April 1995 (age 31)	1	(Russia) Kazan
Shamil Magomedov	Hooker	17 April 1987 (age 39)	9	(Russia) Enisey-STM
Dmitry Parkhomenko	Hooker	2 November 1995 (age 30)	4	(Russia) VVA Podmoskovye
Azamat Bitiev	Prop	9 December 1989 (age 36)	25	(Russia) Enisey-STM
Nikoloz Kazalikashvili	Prop	6 August 1992 (age 34)	1	(Russia) Kazan
Tamerlan Khubaev	Prop	25 April 1998 (age 28)	0	(Russia) Dinamo Moscow
Evgeny Mishechkin	Prop	27 June 1997 (age 29)	22	(Russia) Slava Moscow
Nikoloz Narmania	Prop	13 September 2000 (age 26)	0	(France) Carcassonne
Vladimir Podrezov	Prop	27 January 1994 (age 32)	40	(Russia) VVA Podmoskovye
Stepan Seryakov	Prop	26 September 1997 (age 29)	1	(Russia) Enisey-STM
Alexei Skobiola	Prop	8 August 1991 (age 35)	2	(Russia) Slava Moscow
Nikita Bekov	Lock	4 March 1996 (age 30)	3	(France) Blagnac
Maxim Gargalîc	Lock	7 March 1989 (age 37)	1	(Russia) Enisey-STM
Anton Makarenko	Lock	7 December 1991 (age 34)	1	(Russia) Enisey-STM
German Silenko	Lock	9 August 1995 (age 31)	7	(Russia) Lokomotiv Penza
Victor Arhip	Back row	24 February 1990 (age 36)	1	(Russia) Krasny Yar
Artémy Gallo	Back row	7 October 2000 (age 26)	2	(France) Suresnes
Vladimir Geraskin	Back row	21 May 2000 (age 26)	1	(Russia) Lokomotiv Penza
Victor Gresev (c)	Back row	31 March 1986 (age 40)	106	(Russia) Lokomotiv Penza
Nikita Vavilin	Back row	13 May 1994 (age 32)	24	(Russia) Slava Moscow
Vitaly Zhivatov	Back row	16 February 1992 (age 34)	19	(Russia) VVA Podmoskovye
Stepan Khokhlov	Scrum-half	9 May 1998 (age 28)	6	(Russia) Slava Moscow
Efim Ryabishchuk	Scrum-half	16 March 1999 (age 27)	1	(Russia) Enisey-STM
Alexey Shcherban	Scrum-half	17 November 1990 (age 35)	49	(Russia) Enisey-STM
Gleb Farkov	Fly-half	14 May 1997 (age 29)	1	(Russia) Dinamo Moscow
Ramil Gaisin	Fly-half	26 July 1991 (age 35)	60	(Russia) Enisey-STM
Alexei Golov	Fly-half	24 January 1992 (age 34)	3	(Russia) Kazan
Daniil Semenov	Fly-half	27 June 2000 (age 26)	1	(Russia) CSKA Moscow
German Davydov	Centre	10 March 1994 (age 32)	31	(Russia) VVA Podmoskovye
Dmitry Gerasimov	Centre	16 April 1988 (age 38)	72	(Russia) Enisey-STM
Kirill Golosnitsky	Centre	30 May 1994 (age 32)	23	(Russia) VVA Podmoskovye
Victor Kononov	Centre	26 May 1996 (age 30)	6	(Russia) Enisey-STM
Vladislav Sozonov	Centre	9 October 1993 (age 33)	13	(Russia) Lokomotiv Penza
Alexander Gudok	Wing	3 June 1991 (age 35)	0	(Russia) Lokomotiv Penza
Andrei Karzanov	Wing	25 November 1990 (age 35)	8	(Russia) Lokomotiv Penza
Alexey Mikhaltsov	Wing	24 July 1991 (age 35)	11	(Russia) Enisey-STM
Daniil Potikhanov	Wing	30 November 1999 (age 26)	8	(Russia) Lokomotiv Penza
Vasily Artemyev	Fullback	24 July 1987 (age 39)	97	(Russia) CSKA Moscow
Maxim Shevtsov	Fullback	9 March 2001 (age 25)	0	(Russia) Dinamo Moscow
Dmitry Sukhin	Fullback	15 January 1995 (age 31)	1	(Russia) Krasny Yar

== Kit history ==
2011 World Cup (first)	2011 World Cup (second)	2015 World Cup qualifier (first)	2015 World Cup qualifier (second)	2019 World Cup (first)	2019 World Cup (second)	Current (first)	Current (second)

== Recent and upcoming fixtures ==
Russia hasn't played in official tests after suspension in 2022.

The following table shows fixtures of the Russian national team in not official test matches during the previous 12 months.

Date	Opponent	Opp Rank	Result	Venue	Event
2024-10-12	(Russia) Russian Barbarians	n/a	W 38-21	(Russia) Solidarnost Samara Arena, Samara	Test match

== Other international teams ==
=== Sevens ===
Russia also has a rugby sevens team, which competes in several rounds each year on the World Rugby Sevens Series and in the FIRA-AER Grand Prix Sevens circuit, with Moscow hosting the second leg.

The men's first official match was played at the Sevens World Cup qualifier in Dubai, beating Botswana 38-3. Since then, Russia has played 799 matches, winning 375 and losing 409, with 15 ties.

Russia Sevens team last game was at the Euro Championship in Moscow, losing the third-place game vs Germany 19-12.

Russia was crowned European Sevens Champion three times, in 2007, 2016 and 2017. In European Sevens, Russia has an impressive record of 206 victories, 85 loses and 6 ties.

=== Women ===
Russia fields women's national rugby union teams in both fifteens, where it appeared at the Women's Rugby World Cup in 1994 and 1998 as Russia and in 1991 as the USSR, and in sevens, which took part in the first Women's Rugby World Cup Sevens in 2009 and which contests the IRB Women's Sevens World Series.

== See also ==
- CIS (rugby union)
- Soviet Union national rugby union team
- Russia national rugby league team
