= Rugby union in Russia =

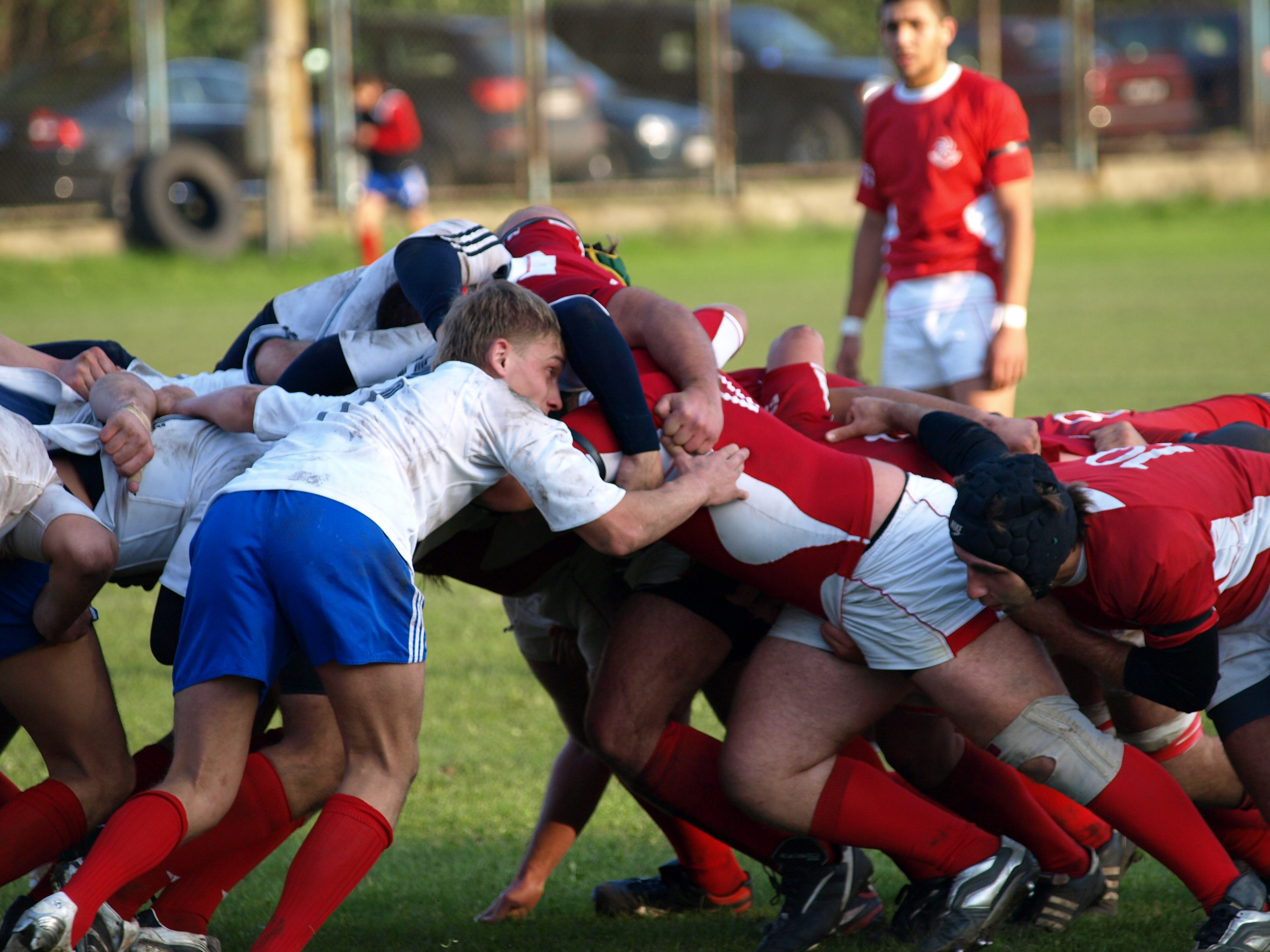
- Russia U19 (in white) playing Georgia U19 in 2009.
- Country: Russia
- Governing body: Rugby Union of Russia
- National team: Russia
- First played: 1884, Moscow
- Registered players: 21,670
- Clubs: 365

National competitions
- Rugby World Cup; Rugby World Cup Sevens; IRB Sevens World Series; European Nations Cup

Club competitions
- Professional Rugby League

Rugby union in Russia is a moderately popular sport. Russia was in 2011 ranked 20th worldwide by the World Rugby, having over three hundred clubs and close to 22,000 players nationally. Russian Rugby Championship is the top-level professional competition held in Russia. Krasnoyarsk, in the middle of Siberia, is traditionally the heartland of Russian rugby.

== Governing body ==
The Rugby Union of Russia is the governing body for rugby union in Russia. It was founded in 1936 originally as the Rugby Union of the Soviet Union, and a specifically Russian body was set up in 1966. The Rugby Union of Russia became affiliated to the International Rugby Board in 1990.

== History ==
=== Medieval times ===
Since the early medieval times Russians played a ballgame, in many ways similar to rugby. In Russian it has been called "Kila" (kee-LAH,) the earliest written accounts of which go back to the 12th Century Novgorod Republic. As the game was strongly associated with pre-Christian pagan traditions, the Russian Orthodox Church didn't tolerate it. By the 19th Century the sport declined and died-out, especially after the English-type soccer was adopted and spread throughout the late Russian Empire.

=== Pre-Revolutionary Russia ===
Rugby football in the Russian Empire pre-dated the Russian Revolution by a number of years, but it was only played sporadically. It appears to have been the first (non-indigenous) football code to be played in Russia, around a decade before the introduction of association football. Mr Hopper, a Scotsman, who worked in Moscow arranged a match in the 1880s; the first soccer match was in 1892. In 1886, however, the Russian police clamped down on rugby because they considered it "brutal, and liable to incite demonstrations and riots" Condemnation by the tsar's police probably deterred many people from playing, and records of rugby over the next thirty years are sparse. Some rugby union was still being played in 1908, however the first "official" match took place in Moscow in 1923.

=== Soviet period ===
Because of the Russian Revolution, some Soviet/Russian players emigrated and/or ended up playing for foreign sides, a notable example being Prince Alexander Obolensky (Александр Сергеевич Оболенский) who played for Oxford and England in the 1930s. His noble birth precluded him from playing in his home country and his family had fled the country when he was only a year old.

In 1934 the Moscow Championship was started, and in 1936 the first Soviet Championship took place.

The game was more or less banned for a number of years in the Soviet Union because of an incident in a final in Moscow, when supporters of Llanelli and a Bucharest team were involved in a brawl.

According to popular myth, in 1949 rugby union was forbidden in the USSR during the "fight against the cosmopolitanism". The competitions were resumed in 1957, and the Soviet Championship in 1966. In 1975 the Soviet national team played their first match. Although there was the Soviet Cup and the Soviet Championship, rugby never became a major sport in the USSR. Union was the bigger of the two codes though - rugby league only really took off in the former Soviet Union after the collapse of Communism.

=== Post-Soviet Russia ===
When the Soviet Union broke up, there were two main consequences - firstly the loss of a much larger pool of players and fans, and secondly, the defection of many players to rugby league, which had previously been frowned on by the Soviet authorities. The two main areas for Russian rugby were to be Moscow and Siberia, and to a lesser extent, Leningrad/St Petersburg.

The most notable Russian player perhaps is Igor Mironov who played for the Barbarians several times during the 1980s. Vasily Artemyev played for Northampton Saints in the English Premiership.

== Russian rugby terminology ==
Russian language terminology for Rugby union positions

1 - форвард первой линии открытой стороны (left prop or loosehead prop)
4 - форвард второй линии (2nd row or lock)
6 - Левый крыльевой (blindside flanker)
11 - Левый крайний трёхчетвертной (left wing)

2 - отыгрывающий (хукер) (Hooker)	3 - форвард первой линии закрытой стороны (right prop or tighthead prop)
5 - Форвард второй линии (2nd row or lock)
8 - Стягивающий (восьмерка) (number 8)	7 - Правый крыльевой (openside flanker)
9 - Полузащитник схватки (девятка) (halfback or scrum-half)
10 - Блуждающий полузащитник (десятка) (first five-eight or fly-half)
12 - Центральный трёхчетвертной (second five-eight or inside centre)
13 - Центральный трёхчетвертной (center or outside centre)
14 - Правый крайний трёхчетвертной (четырнадцатый) (right wing)
15 - Защитник (замок) (fullback)

== Climate ==
In 1978, Russia set the record for one of the coldest matches ever to be played, when Krasnoyarsk played Polyechika Alma at -23' C. Because Krasnoyarsk had travelled over 2,000 km to be there, the game was not called off. Instead, players resorted to wearing balaclavas, gloves, and several pairs of tracksuits to combat the cold. Nonetheless, the extreme climate of Russia remains a problem, with winter sometimes being a split season, or the game of snow rugby being played.

== Popularity ==
Although association football is the most popular spectator sport in Russia, rugby has been growing in terms of player base, spectator interest and media coverage in recent years. Rugby's rise into mainstream media happened a few years ago when the Heineken Cup, a club tournament in Europe, was given television coverage on the 7TV sports channel. 7TV also broadcast the 2003 Rugby World Cup. Subsequently, Russia's domestic championship, the Professional Rugby League, has earned weekly coverage on the RTR-Sport channel (a number of countries also receive this channel, such as Ukraine), though the games are not shown live. In addition to television coverage, rugby now features in mainstream news publications. In early 2006, RTR-Sport purchased the rights to cover the 2007 Rugby World Cup. In 2007 Moscow made an unsuccessful bid to host the 2009 Rugby World Cup Sevens. It was announced in February 2009 that the Rugby Union of Russia would again bid to host the Rugby World Cup Sevens, in 2013. After two other bidders (Brazil and Germany) withdrew, leaving Russia the only country with an active bid, Russia was officially named as host in May 2010. Russia also hosted the IRB Junior World Rugby Trophy, the IRB's second-tier international competition for under-20 men's teams, in 2010.

== Competitions ==
The main club competition in Russia is the Professional Rugby League, a fully professional competition. The competing clubs are VVA Saracens from Monino in Moscow Oblast and Slava from Moscow, Enisei-STM and Krasny Yar both from Krasnoyarsk, RC Penza, RC Novokuznetsk, and Universitet from Chita Oblast.

=== 2013 Professional League teams ===
Club	City	Stadium	Capacity
VVA Saracens	Monino	Gagarin Air Force Academy stadium	5000
Yenisey-STM	Krasnoyarsk	Avangard Stadium	5000
Krasny Yar	Krasnoyarsk	Krasny Yar Stadium	3200
Slava Moscow	Moscow	Slava Stadium	2000
Spartak GM Moscow	Moscow	Rugby Academy Stadium	~1000
Fili Moscow	Moscow	Fili Stadium	2000
RC Novokuznetsk	Novokuznetsk	Rugby Stadium	~1000
Strela-Agro Kazan	Kazan	Tulpar Arena	3000
RC Bulava	Taganrog	Raduga Stadium	~1000
RC Kuban	Krasnodar	Trud Stadium	~1000

=== 2013 Top League Teams ===
Club	City
Imperia Penza	Penza
Narva Zastava	St Petersburg
Dynamo-Energy	Kazan
RC Zelenograd	Zelenograd
VVA Academy	Monino
Enisey-STM Krasnoyarsk	Krasnoyarsk
Strela-Agro Kazan	Kazan
Maryino	Moscow
Zelenograd Moscow	Moscow
Mai Yuzhny Tushino Moscow	Moscow
Varyag Novgorod	Novgorod

=== Locations of Top 2 Tier Teams 2013 ===
Locations of the 2013 Professional Rugby League & Super League teams

=== National champions ===
Year	Team	Year	Team	Year	Team
1992	Krasny Yar	2002	Yenisey-STM	2012	Yenisey-STM
1993	VVA-Podmoskovye	2003	VVA-Podmoskovye	2013	Krasny Yar
1994	Krasny Yar	2004	VVA-Podmoskovye		
1995	Krasny Yar	2005	Yenisey-STM		
1996	Krasny Yar	2006	VVA-Podmoskovye		
1997	Krasny Yar	2007	VVA-Podmoskovye		
1998	Krasny Yar	2008	VVA-Podmoskovye		
1999	Yenisey-STM	2009	VVA-Podmoskovye		
2000	Krasny Yar	2010	VVA-Podmoskovye		
2001	Krasny Yar	2011	Yenisey-STM		

== International ==
The Six Nations B, also known as the European Nations Cup (ENC) is similar to the Six Nations Championship. Russia finished third in the 2001 and 2001–02 competitions and second in the 2007–08 and 2008–10 competitions. Their second-place finish in 2008–10 also secured Russia's first appearance in the Rugby World Cup, which took place in 2011 in New Zealand. The Nations Cup was introduced by the IRB in 2006, in which Russia and Portugal along with Argentina A and Italy A competed in Portugal.

=== Super Powers Cup ===
The Super Cup was an annual international rugby union competition contested by national teams from Canada, Japan, Romania and the United States. It was previously known as the Super Powers Cup.

The Super Powers Cup was first launched in 2003. It was planned that China, Japan, Russia and the United States would play each other once. However, because of the SARS outbreak the Chinese team were forced to withdraw. Russia won the inaugural competition, defeating the United States 30–21 in Krasnoyarsk, Russia. For the 2004 competition Canada replaced China.

European Challenge Cup

In 2015 Russian club Yenisey-STM was included for the 2015–2016 season of the European Challenge Cup. The first fixture was against Irish club Connacht at their home stadium. During the match temperatures got close to -20 °C and the field was covered in ice. Yenisey-STM lost 14–31 against Connacht.

== National team ==
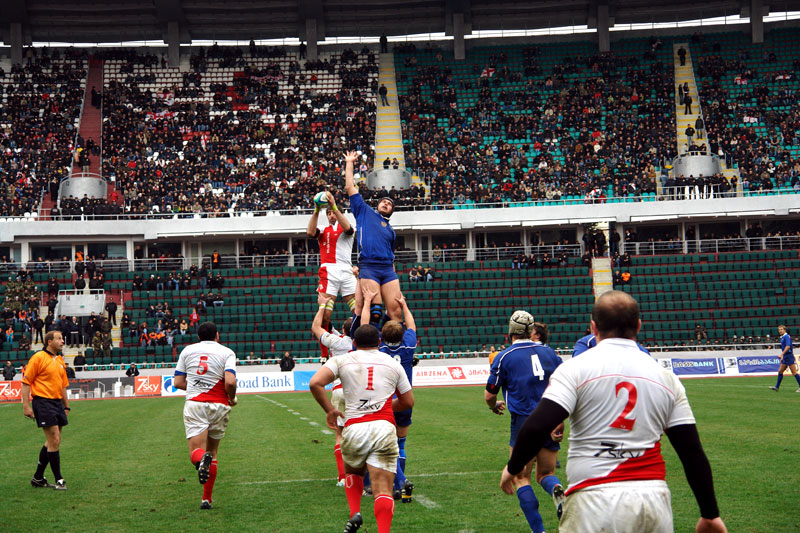
Russia playing Georgia

Russia previously played as part of the USSR, and in the early 1990s, as a combined CIS team. Since 1992 however, they have been playing as Russia. The team qualified for its first Rugby World Cup by tying Romania 21-21.

Russia competes regularly in the European Nations Cup, and more recently, in the Nations Cup.

Russia succeeded in qualifying for the 2011 Rugby World Cup and for the 2019 Rugby World Cup.

== See also ==
- Russia national rugby union team
- USSR national rugby union team
- Rugby Union of Russia
- Professional Rugby League
- Rugby league in Russia
- Sport in Russia
- Marcel Burgun, France, born in St Petersburg.
