= 2008 Russian Professional Rugby League season =

4th season of the Russian Professional Rugby League

2008 Professional Rugby League season
- Countries: Russia
- Champions: VVA-Podmoskovye Monino (8th title)

The 2008 Russian Professional Rugby League Season was the fourth season of the new Russian Professional Rugby League. The season saw a huge expansion of the competition with the entrance of 14 teams into the preliminary group stage of the championship. VVA Monino were the eventual champions.

== Format ==
This season saw the introduction of an initial group stage whereby the championship was divided into two Divisions, the Eastern Division consisting of six teams, and the Western Division consisting of eight, with the West Division further subdivided into two groups of four. At the end of the group stage the top six sides formed a super-group that then featured a home and away stage between these six sides.

The play-offs again featured a best of three semi final stage with the top side playing against the four side, whilst two versed three. The final itself was a best of three if required, though the surprise finalists Slava Moscow were defeated by VVA Monino 2-0.

== Teams ==
Club	City
VVA Monino	Monino
Slava Moscow	Moscow
Fili Moscow	Moscow
RK Zelenograd (Moscow)	Moscow
Spartak GM	Moscow
RK Maryina (Moscow)	Moscow
Yenisey-STM	Krasnoyarsk
Krasny Yar	Krasnoyarsk
RK Siberia (Krasnoyarsk)	Krasnoyarsk
Siberian Federal University (Krasnoyarsk)	Krasnoyarsk
RC Novokuznetsk	Novokuznetsk
Imperia-Dynamo	Penza
Universitet Chita	Chita
Dynamo-Don (Rostov-na-Donu)	Rostov-na-Donu

== Stage One East Divisions ==
Pos	Team	Pld	W	D	L	PF	PA	PD	Pts
1	Yenisey-STM Krasnoyarsk	0	0	0	0	0	0	0	0
2	RC Novokuznetsk	0	0	0	0	0	0	0	0
3	Krasny Yar Krasnoyarsk	0	0	0	0	0	0	0	0
4	RK Siberia	0	0	0	0	0	0	0	0
5	Universitet Chita	0	0	0	0	0	0	0	0
6	Siberian Federal University	0	0	0	0	0	0	0	0

Round One

11 May 2008	Yenisey-STM Krasnoyarsk (Russia)	99 – 10	(Russia) Siberian Federal University	Russia
		[]

12 May 2008	Krasny Yar Krasnoyarsk (Russia)	61 – 8	(Russia) RK Siberia	Russia
		[]

12 May 2008	Novokuznetsk (Russia)	68 – 3	(Russia) University Chita	Russia
		[]

Round Two

17 May 2008	Siberian Federal University (Russia)	11 – 23	(Russia) University Chita	Russia
		[]

18 May 2008	RK Siberia (Russia)	18 – 26	(Russia) Novokuznetsk	Russia
		[]

May 2008	Yenisey-STM Krasnoyarsk (Russia)	33 – 5	(Russia) Krasny Yar Krasnoyarsk	Russia
		[]

Round 3

Yenisey-STM Krasnoyarsk (Russia)	29 – 11	(Russia) Novokuznetsk	Russia
	[]

Siberian Federal University (Russia)	7 – 48	(Russia) Krasny Yar Krasnoyarsk	Russia
	[]

RK Siberia (Russia)	19 – 0	(Russia) University Chita	Russia
	[]

== Stage One West Division (Group A) ==
Pos	Team	Pld	W	D	L	PF	PA	PD	Pts
1	VVA Monino	0	0	0	0	0	0	0	0
2	Dynamo-Don	0	0	0	0	0	0	0	0
3	Fili Moscow	0	0	0	0	0	0	0	0
4	RK Maryina	0	0	0	0	0	0	0	0

Round One

18 May 2008	VVA Monino (Russia)	97 – 7	(Russia) RK Marinya	Russia
		[]

18 May 2008	Dynamo-Don (Russia)	27 – 20	(Russia) Fili Moscow	Russia
		[]

Round Two

Dynamo-Don (Russia)	12 – 48	(Russia) VVA Monino	Russia
	[]

Fili Moscow (Russia)	76 – 9	(Russia) RK Maryina	Russia
	[]

== Stage One West Division (Group B) ==
Pos	Team	Pld	W	D	L	PF	PA	PD	Pts
1	Slava Moscow	0	0	0	0	0	0	0	0
2	Imperia-Dynamo	0	0	0	0	0	0	0	0
3	Spartak-GM Moscow	0	0	0	0	0	0	0	0
4	RK Zelenograd	0	0	0	0	0	0	0	0

Round One

Slava Moscow (Russia)	83 – 3	(Russia) Spartak-GM Moscow	Russia
	[]

18 May 2008	Imperia-Dynamo Penza (Russia)	88 – 6	(Russia) RK Zelenograd	Russia
		[]

Round Two

Slava Moscow (Russia)	38 – 33	(Russia) Imperia-Dynamo Penza	Russia
	[]

RK Zelnograd (Russia)	3 – 5	(Russia) Spartak-GM Moscow	Russia
	[]

== Superleague (Final League) Table (Places 1-6) ==
Pos	Team	Pld	W	D	L	PF	PA	PD	Pts
1	VVA-Podmoskovye Monino	10	9	0	1	374	119	+255	37
2	Krasny Yar Krasnoyarsk	10	6	0	4	198	255	−57	28
3	Slava Moscow	10	5	1	4	211	226	−15	26
4	Yenisey-STM Krasnoyarsk	10	5	0	5	257	158	+99	25
5	RC Novokuznetsk	10	4	1	5	168	194	−26	23
6	Imperia-Dynamo Penza	10	0	0	10	138	395	−257	10

== Play-offs ==
2008 Russian Professional League Play-offs
Home	Score	Away
Semi-Finals (Best of 3 Match Series)
VVA-Podmoskovye Monino	2-1	Yenisey-STM Krasnoyarsk
Krasny Yar Krasnoyarsk	1-2	Slava Moscow
Finals (Best of 3 Match Series)
3rd Place Play-off Final
Krasny Yar Krasnoyarsk	0-2	Yenisey-STM Krasnoyarsk
Championship Final
VVA-Podmoskovye Monino	2-0	Slava Moscow
