= 2009 Russian Professional Rugby League season =

2010 Professional Rugby League season
- Countries: Russia
- Champions: VVA-Podmoskovye Monino (8th title)

The 2009 Russian Professional Rugby League season was the fifth season of the Russian Professional Rugby League.

This season saw yet another change in structure for the competition. The two-stage competition was retained, whereby the championship was still split into East and West. The somewhat complicated structure was as follows:

Stage One:

- The professional teams divided into two groups based on geography, East (6) and West (5).
- The top three teams from each group qualified for the Super League (Pos 1 - 6).
- The bottom two clubs from the West entered a play-off stage against qualifying teams from the Federal Leagues to qualify for Stage Two (Pos 7 - 12).
- The fourth (4th) ranked club in the East qualified automatically for Stage Two (Pos 7 - 12).

Stage Two:

- Super League (Pos 1 - 6)
- Play-offs (Pos 7 - 12)

== Stage One East Division ==
East Division Standings

1. Yenisey-STM Krasnoyarsk
2. Krasny Yar Krasnoyarsk
3. RC Novokuznetsk
4. Kosmos Krasnoyarsk
5. Rugby Academy Krasnoyarsk
6. Siberian Federal University

East Division Fixtures

== Stage One West Division ==
West Division Standings

1. VVA-Podmoskovye Monino
2. Imperia-Dynamo Penza
3. Slava Moscow
4. Spartak-GM Moscow
5. Fili Moscow

West Division Fixtures

== Stage Two Qualifiers ==
At this stage the two non-qualified West Division teams, Fili Moscow and Spartak-GM Moscow, entered a round-robin stage against teams that qualified from the Federal District Leagues, which were:

- South Krasnodar
- Narva Zastava (St Petersberg)
- Air Force Academy Monino
- Nalchik

The six teams were divided into two groups of three. The top three ranked sides then entered a final stage in which they were joined by Rugby Academy Krasnoyarsk (after Kosmos Krasnoyarsk pulled out).

Group A Standings

Group A Fixtures

Group B Standings

Group B Fixtures

Final Standings (Pos 7 - 12)

Final Fixtures (Pos 7 - 12)

== Super League (Places 1-6) ==
| Pos | Team | Pld | W | D | L | PF | PA | PD | Pts |
|---|---|---|---|---|---|---|---|---|---|
| 1 | VVA-Podmoskovye Monino | 10 | 9 | 0 | 1 | 399 | 128 | +271 | 37 |
| 2 | Yenisey-STM Krasnoyarsk | 10 | 9 | 0 | 1 | 331 | 140 | +191 | 37 |
| 3 | Krasny Yar Krasnoyarsk | 10 | 6 | 0 | 4 | 247 | 198 | +49 | 28 |
| 4 | Slava Moscow | 10 | 3 | 0 | 7 | 126 | 267 | −141 | 19 |
| 5 | Imperia-Dynamo Penza | 10 | 2 | 0 | 8 | 130 | 284 | −154 | 16 |
| 6 | RC Novokuznetsk | 10 | 1 | 0 | 9 | 120 | 336 | −216 | 13 |

== Final Stage Fixtures ==
Round One

| 15 July 2009 | Imperia-Dynamo Penza (Russia) | 26 – 17 | (Russia) RC Novokuznetsk | Russia |

| 17 July 2009 | VVA Moino (Russia) | 23 – 9 | (Russia) Krasny Yar Krasnoyarsk | Russia |

| 17 July 2009 | Slava Moscow (Russia) | 17 – 35 | (Russia) Yenisey-STM Krasnoyarsk | Russia |

Round Two

| 21 July 2009 | Imperia-Dynamo Penza (Russia) | 3 – 36 | (Russia) Yenisey-STM Krasnoyarsk | Russia |

| 23 July 2009 | Krasny Yar Krasnoyarsk (Russia) | 67 – 3 | (Russia) RC Novokuznetsk | Russia |

| 23 July 2009 | VVA Monino (Russia) | 33 – 0 | (Russia) Slava Moscow | Russia |

Round Three

| 29 July 2009 | Imperia-Dynamo Penza (Russia) | 12 – 16 | (Russia) Krasny Yar Krasnoyarsk | Russia |

| 29 July 2009 | RC Novokuznetsk (Russia) | 17 – 22 | (Russia) Slava Moscow | Russia |

| 30 July 2009 | Yenisey-STM Krasnoyarsk (Russia) | 30 – 19 | (Russia) VVA Monino | Russia |

Round Four

| 4 August 2009 | VVA Monino (Russia) | 31 – 6 | (Russia) Imperia-Dynamo Penza | Russia |

| 10 August 2009 | Krasny Yar Krasnoyarsk (Russia) | 10 – 12 | (Russia) Yenisey-STM Krasnoyarsk | Russia |

| 11 August 2009 | Slava Moscow (Russia) | 18 – 13 | (Russia) Imperia-Dynamo Penza | Russia |

Round Five

| 11 August 2009 | RC Novokuznetsk (Russia) | 10 – 50 | (Russia) VVA Monino | Russia |

| 16 August 2009 | Yenisey-STM Krasnoyarsk (Russia) | 30 – 7 | (Russia) RC Novokuznetsk | Russia |

| 17 August 2009 | Krasny Yar Krasnoyarsk (Russia) | 35 – 10 | (Russia) Slava Moscow | Russia |

Round Six

| 20 August 2009 | Yenisey-STM Krasnoyarsk (Russia) | 47 – 10 | (Russia) Slava Moscow | Russia |

| 24 August 2009 | RC Novokuznetsk (Russia) | 32 – 22 | (Russia) Imperia-Dynamo Penza | Russia |

| 24 August 2009 | Krasny Yar Krasnoyarsk (Russia) | 20 – 48 | (Russia) VVA Monino | Russia |

Round Seven

| 30 August 2009 | Yenisey-STM Krasnoyarsk (Russia) | 47 – 9 | (Russia) Imperia-Dynamo Penza | Russia |

| 30 August 2009 | RC Novokuznetsk (Russia) | 7 – 30 | (Russia) Krasny Yar Krasnoyarsk | Russia |

| 31 August 2009 | Slava Moscow (Russia) | 20 – 48 | (Russia) VVA Monino | Russia |

Round Eight

| 3 September 2009 | Krasny Yar Krasnoyarsk (Russia) | 37 – 21 | (Russia) Imperia-Dynamo Penza | Russia |

| 6 September 2009 | VVA Monino (Russia) | 48 – 21 | (Russia) Yenisey-STM Krasnoyarsk | Russia |

| 8 September 2009 | Slava Moscow (Russia) | 12 – 10 | (Russia) RC Novokuznetsk | Russia |

Round Nine

| 11 September 2009 | VVA Monino (Russia) | 55 – 7 | (Russia) RC Novokuznetsk | Russia |

| 14 September 2009 | Imperia-Dynamo Penza (Russia) | 13 – 6 | (Russia) Slava Moscow | Russia |

| 15 September 2009 | Yenisey-STM Krasnoyarsk (Russia) | 42 – 7 | (Russia) Krasny Yar Krasnoyarsk | Russia |

Round Ten

| 21 September 2009 | Imperia-Dynamo Penza (Russia) | 5 – 44 | (Russia) VVA Monino | Russia |

| 21 September 2009 | RC Novokuznetsk (Russia) | 10 – 22 | (Russia) Yenisey-STM Krasnoyarsk | Russia |

| 21 September 2009 | Slava Moscow (Russia) | 11 – 16 | (Russia) Krasny Yar Krasnoyarsk | Russia |

=== Play-offs ===
2009 Russian Professional League Play-offs
| Home | Score | Away |
Semi-Finals (Best of 3 Match Series)
| VVA-Podmoskovye Monino | 2-0 | Slava Moscow |
| Yenisy-STM Krasnoyarsk | 2-1 | Krasny Yar Krasnoyarsk |
Finals (Best of 3 Match Series)
3rd Place Play-off Final
| Krasny Yar Krasnoyarsk | 2-0 | Slava Moscow |
Championship Final
| VVA-Podmoskovye Monino | 2-1 | Yenisy-STM Krasnoyarsk |
