= 2010 Russian Professional Rugby League season =

- Countries: Russia
- Champions: VVA-Podmoskovye Monino (8th title)
- Matches played: 56

The 2010 Russian Professional Rugby League season was the sixth edition of Russia's newly formatted top-flight rugby union competition, the Professional Rugby League ("RPRL"). The 2010 Professional Rugby League season has seen a transition to a traditional one league round-robin format with 8 teams taking place between May and September 2010. VVA Podmoskovye Monino are the reigning champions.

The two undisputed powerhouses of recent years, VVA-Podmoskovye and Yenisy-STM, were again expected to dominate, but Krasny-Yar had recruited well and were looking to break VVA's grip on the title. These three teams all had budgets seven figure euro budgets, and played at a standard roughly comparable to Championship (England) or Pro D2 (France) level, according to the RFU and FFR referees who officiate in the final stages of the competition.

Unfortunately for the two Krasnoyarsk sides, despite a few upsets throughout the season, VVA Monino again was triumphant in the finals series, to claim a record 8th title.

== Competition format ==
To facilitate Russia's participation in the summer's Churchill Cup during June, changes to the league's structure were again made. The 2010 edition of the RPRL saw the dropping of the first phase of the season, which split the league into East and West sections and saw the involvement of several amateur teams. Instead, the RPRL was expanded into an eight-team tournament to be played on a home-and-away basis from May through September, before the top four teams play-off for the title in two best-of-three semi-finals and a best-of-three championship decider.

Plans continued to be discussed during the year about future expansion of the league to 12, and then 16, teams in time, but the unique problems posed by Russia's vast geography mean this will be a slow process. The two new teams for this year, Spartak and Fili, are both from Moscow, meaning plans to bring in a team from Kazan, remained on hold. A former rugby league hotbed, Kazan is a major target for future expansion, with several age-group tournaments being held in the Tatar capital. Absent too were former league giant RC Lokomotiv Moscow, whose defection from the 13-man code resulted in a focus on Sevens only for the 2010 season. There was also no place in this year's RPRL for a team from the country's south, where rugby is increasingly popular, in particular in Krasnodar territory and the Rostov region.

== Teams ==
- VVA-Podmoskovye Monino, from Monino, Moscow Oblast
- Yenisy-STM Krasnoyarsk, from Krasnoyarsk, Krasnoyarsk Oblast
- Krasny Yar Krasnoyarsk, from Krasnoyarsk, Krasnoyarsk Oblast
- Slava Moscow, from Moscow, Moscow Oblast
- Imperia-Dynamo Penza, from Penza
- RC Novokuznetsk, from Novokuznesk
- Fili Moscow, from Moscow, Moscow Oblast
- Spartak Moscow, from Moscow, Moscow Oblast

== Table ==
Pos	Team	Pld	W	D	L	PF	PA	PD	Pts
1	VVA Monino	14	13	0	1	688	136	+552	52
2	Yenisey-STM	14	12	0	2	590	172	+418	50
3	Krasny Yar	14	10	0	4	538	220	+318	44
4	Slava Moscow	14	7	1	6	246	269	−23	36
5	Imperia-Dynamo Penza	14	6	0	8	285	412	−127	32
6	RC Novokuznetsk	14	5	0	9	316	333	−17	29
7	Spartak Moscow	14	2	1	11	183	548	−365	21
8	Fili Moscow	14	0	0	14	80	836	−756	14

== Fixtures ==
May

- 16.5 VVA-Podmoskovye Monino 52 - 0 Imperia-Dynamo Penza / Attd =
- 18.5 Yenisey-STM 22 - 3 Slava Moscow/ Attd = 2000
- 22.5 VVA-Podmoskovye Monino 43 - 10 Krasny Yar/ Attd =
- 24.5 Spartak-GM 15 - 20 Imperia-Dynamo Penza/ Attd = 500
- 25.5 Yenisey-STM 46 - 13 RK Novokuznetsk/ Attd = 1500
- 26.5 VVA-Podmoskovye Monino 7 - 34 Slava Moscow/ Attd = 200
- 28.5 Krasny Yar 93 - 3 Fili Moscow/ Attd = 1000
- 31.5 Yenisey-STM 83 - 6 Fili Moscow/ Attd = 1000
- 31.5 Spartak-GM 22 - 22 Slava Moscow/ Attd =

June

- 6.6 RK Novokuznetsk 38 – 18 Spartak-GM/ Attd =
- 7.6 Imperia-Dynamo Penza 12 - 8 Slava Moscow/ Attd =
- 12.6 Spartak-GM 7 - 73 Krasny-Yar/ Attd = 100
- 14.6 Fili Moscow 7 - 42 Imperia-Dynamo Penza/ Attd =
- 16.6 Slava Moscow 5 - 33 Krasny-Yar/ Attd =
- 21.6 Fili Moscow 6 - 36 RK Novokuznetsk/ Attd =
- 21.6 Spartak-GM 6 - 48 Yenisey-STM / Attd =
- 24.6 VVA-Podmoskovye Monino 38 - 13 RK Novokuznetsk / Attd =
- 24.6 Imperia-Dynamo Penza 9 - 24 Yenisey-STM/ Attd =
- 29.6 VVA-Podmoskovye Monino 71 - 3 Spartak-GM/ Attd =
- 29.6 RK Novokuznetsk 29 - 33 Slava Moscow/ Attd =

July

- 1.7 Krasny-Yar 24 - 29 Yenisey-STM/ Attd =
- 4.7 Spartak-GM 29 - 7 Fili Moscow/ Attd =
- 6.7 RK Novokuznetsk 47 - 0 Fili Moscow/ Attd =
- 12.7 Slava Moscow 8 - 6 Spartak-GM/ Attd =
- 13.7 Krasny-Yar 34 - 14 RK Novokuznetsk/ Attd =
- 14.7 Spartak-GM 6 - 52 Yenisey-STM/ Attd =
- 19.7 Fili Moscow 3 - 30 Slava Moscow/ Attd =
- 22.7 Yenisey-STM 7 - 30 VVA-Podmoskovye Monino/ Attd =
- 22.7 Imperia-Dynamo Penza 3 - 29 Krasny-Yar/ Attd =
- 26.7 Imperia-Dynamo Penza 46 – 9 Spartak-GM/ Attd =
- 26.7 Fili Moscow 6 – 60 Krasny-Yar/ Attd =
- 26.7 RK Novokuznetsk 10 – 27 Yenisey-STM/ Attd =
- 27.7 Slava Moscow 13 – 45 VVA-Podmoskovye Penza/ Attd =

August

- 2.8 Imperia-Dynamo Penza 29 - 18 RK Novokuznetsk/ Attd =
- 2.8 Krasny-Yar 10 - 17 VVA-Podmoskovye Monino/ Attd =
- 10.8 VVA-Podmoskovye Monino 25 - 16 Yenisey-STM/ Attd =
- 11.8 Slava Moscow 22 - 12 Imperia-Dynamo Penza/ Attd =
- 16.8 RK Novokuznetsk 16 - 34 VVA-Podmoskovye Monino/ Attd =
- 16.8 Krasny-Yar 34 - 5 Slava Moscow/ Attd =
- 17.8 Imperia-Dynamo Penza 52 - 0 Fili Moscow/ Attd =
- 23.8 Fili Moscow 13 - 36 Spartak-GM/ Attd =
- 23.8 Yenisey-STM 41 - 14 Krasny-Yar/ Attd =
- 24.8 Slava Moscow 9 - 6 RK Novokuznetsk/ Attd =
- 24.8 Imperia-Dynamo Penza 3 - 65 VVA-Podmoskovye Monino/ Attd =
- 27.8 Spartak-GM 11 - 29 RK Novokuznetsk/ Attd =
- 28.8 VVA-Podmoskovye Monino 88 - 0 Fili Moscow/ Attd =
- 30.8 Slava Moscow 3 - 32 Yenisey-STM/ Attd =
- 31.8 Krasny-Yar 49 - 19 Imperia-Dynamo Penza/ Attd =
- 31.8 Fili Moscow 6 - 81 Yenisey-STM/ Attd =

September

- 5 September 18:00 Yenisey-STM 82 - 17 Imperia-Dynamo Penza/ Attd =
- 5 September 18:30 Spartak-GM 5 - 75 VVA-Podmoskovye / Attd =
- 5 September 17:00 RK Novokuznetsk 15 - 29 Krasny-Yar/ Attd =
- 5 September 19:00 Slava Moscow 55 - 13 Fili Moscow/ Attd =
- 9 September 18:30 18:30 RK Novokuznetsk 21 - 32 Imperia-Dynamo Penza/ Attd =
- 9 September 18:00 Krasny-Yar 46 - 13 Spartak-GM / Attd =
- 9 September Fili Moscow 10 - 107 VVA-Podmoskovye / Attd =

== Playoffs Positions 5 to 8 ==
Semi-Finals

- 19 September Spartak-GM 8:22 Novokuznetsk Moscow
- 23 September Imperia-Dynamo 47:6 Fili Moscow, Fili
- 27 September Imperia-Dyanmo 54:17 Fili, Penza
- 29 September Novokuznetsk 30:0 Spartak-GM, Novokuznetsk

Final for 7th Place

- October 4 17:00 Fili Moscow 15:53 Spartak-GM Moscow, Moscow
- October 11 15:00 Spartak-GM Moscow 37:31 Fili, Moscow

Final for 5th Place

- October 3 Imperia-Dynamo Penza 18:11 RC Novokuznetsk, Novokuznetsk, st. Rugby
- October 10 16:00 Imperia-Dynamo Penza 27:15 Novokuznetsk, Penza, st. Penza

== Championship Semi-Finals ==
Semi-Finals

- 19 September 17:00 (Sunday) Krasny Yar Krasnoyarsk 11:24 Yenisey-STM, Krasnoyarsk st. Krasny Yar
- 20 September (Monday) Slava Moscow 22:87 VVA Monino, Moscow, st. Glory
- 26 September 17:00 (Sunday) Yenisey-STM 28:18 Krasny Yar Krasnoyarsk, Krasnoyarsk, st. Avangard
- 26 September (Sunday) VVA Monino64:17 Slava Moscow, smt. Monino

== Championship finals ==
3rd Place Finals

- 3 October (Sunday) 16:00 Slava Moscow 27:23 Krasny Yar Krasnoyarsk, Moscow, st. Glory
- 10 October (Sunday) 16:00 Krasny Yar Krasnoyarsk 16:14 Slava Moscow, Krasnoyarsk st. Krasny Yar
- 13 October (Wednesday)16:00 Krasny Yar Krasnoyarsk 33:13 Slava Moscow, Krasnoyarsk st. Krasny Yar

Championship Finals

- 3 October (Sunday) 17:00 Yenisey-STM 6:17 VVA Monino, Krasnoyarsk st. Avangard
- 10 October (Sunday) 15:00 VVA Monino 42:25 Yenisey-STM, Moscow smt. Monino
