= 2007 Russian Professional Rugby League season =

2007 Professional Rugby League season
- Countries: Russia

This was the third season of the new Russian Professional Rugby League,

== Table ==
Pos	Team	Pld	W	D	L	PF	PA	PD	Pts
1	VVA-Podmoskovye Monino	20	19	0	1	938	233	+705	82
2	Yenisey-STM Krasnoyarsk	20	15	0	5	649	234	+415	68
3	Slava Moscow	20	12	1	7	644	334	+310	59
4	Krasny Yar Krasnoyarsk	20	9	1	10	558	441	+117	50
5	RC Novokuznetsk	20	3	0	17	339	808	−469	29
6	Universitet Chita	20	1	0	19	138	1216	−1078	24
