= 2011 Russian Professional Rugby League season =

- Countries: Russia

The 2011 Russian Professional Rugby League season will be the seventh edition of the competition since its transition from the Super League.

Reigning champions VVA Monino will compete for a ninth championship, which would make them the most successful Russian rugby union club of the professional era, surpassing Krasny Yar.

There have again been a number of changes and events taking place behind the scenes at the Russian Rugby Union. At the start of the season, rumours spread that the league would again expand, possibly to as many as fifteen (15) teams. Of the potential new entrants, the most likely entrant was a team based in the city of Kazan, a former "stronghold" of rugby league in Russia.

However, due to the commitments of the national team at the World Cup, it was decided that there would be no new teams added to the competition. To compensate, a lower division was created, called the First Division, wherein seven teams will compete for the chance to be promoted to the "Super League".

== Competition format ==
Details of this season's competition format have not yet been decided.

== Teams ==
- VVA-Podmoskovye Monino, from Monino, Moscow Oblast.
- Yenisy-STM Krasnoyarsk, from Krasnoyarsk, Krasnoyarsk Oblast.
- Krasny Yar Krasnoyarsk, from Krasnoyarsk, Krasnoyarsk Oblast.
- Slava Moscow, from Moscow, Moscow Oblast.
- Imperia-Dynamo Penza, from Penza.
- RC Novokuznetsk, from Novokuznesk
- Fili Moscow, from Moscow, Moscow Oblast.
- Spartak Moscow, from Moscow, Moscow Oblast.

== Warm-up fixtures and results ==
| 21 February 2011 | Farul Constanţa (Romania) | 7 – 31 | (Russia) Yenisey-STM Krasnoyarsk | Turkey |
| | | [] |

| 27 February 2011 | Lazio Roma Rugby (Italy) | 14 – 37 | (Russia) Yenisey-STM Krasnoyarsk | Italy |

| 1 March 2011 | Ludom Avezzano Rugby (Italy) | 12 – 74 | (Russia) Yenisey-STM Krasnoyarsk | Italy |

| 5 March 2011 | L'Aquila (Italy) | 12 – 24 | (Russia) Yenisey-STM Krasnoyarsk | Stadio Tommaso Fattori, L'Aquila |
| | Try: Maurizio Zaffiri, Marco Di Massimo; Con: Stefano Paolucci (1) | | Try: Victor Arhip, Yulris Baranovs, Vitaly Orlov, Yaroslav Rechnev; Con: Igor Kurashov (2) |

| 13 March 2011 | Burnside Rugby Football Club (New Zealand) | 7 – 32 | (Russia) Krasny Yar Krasnoyarsk | Canterbury, New Zealand |

| 16 March 2011 | Lincoln University (New Zealand) | 15 – 56 | (Russia) Krasny Yar Krasnoyarsk | Canterbury, New Zealand |

| 26 March 2011 | Kazan (Russia) | 0 – 40 | (Russia) Imperia-Dynamo Penza | Turkey |

| 20 March 2011 | Oxford RFC (New Zealand) | 28 – 40 | (Russia) Krasny Yar Krasnoyarsk | Canterbury, New Zealand |

| 23 March 2011 | Canterbury Academy (New Zealand) | 58 – 5 | (Russia) Krasny Yar Krasnoyarsk | Canterbury, New Zealand |

| RC Novokuznetsk (Russia) | 10 – 5 | (Russia) Imperia-Dynamo Penza | Russia |

| 27 March 2011 | Shirley (New Zealand) | 14 – 39 | (Russia) Krasny Yar Krasnoyarsk | Canterbury, New Zealand |

| 14 April 2011 | Rainbow (Russia) | 5 – 78 | (Russia) Krasny Yar Krasnoyarsk | Russia |

| 17 April 2011 | Slava Moscow (Russia) | 6 – 29 | (Russia) Krasny Yar Krasnoyarsk | Russia |

| 22 April 2011 | VVA-Podmoskovye Monino (Russia) | 45 – 40 | (France) FC Grenoble | Russia |
| | Try: Mikhail Babaev, Kirill Kushnarev, Alexei Cotruta, Yevgeny Matveev, Vasily Artemiev, scrum. | | Try: Marvin O'Connor, Benjamin Terchi, Wylie Human, Alexis Driollet, Rida Jaouher, Alten Hulme |

== Table ==
| Pos | Team | Pld | W | D | L | PF | PA | PD | Pts |
|---|---|---|---|---|---|---|---|---|---|
| 1 | Yenisey-STM Krasnoyarsk | 12 | 11 | 0 | 1 | 513 | 75 | +438 | 45 |
| 2 | VVA-Podmoskovye Monino | 13 | 10 | 1 | 2 | 451 | 196 | +255 | 44 |
| 3 | Krasny Yar Krasnoyarsk | 12 | 8 | 1 | 3 | 409 | 131 | +278 | 37 |
| 4 | RC Novokuznetsk | 13 | 6 | 1 | 6 | 269 | 331 | −62 | 32 |
| 5 | Slava Moscow | 13 | 4 | 1 | 8 | 235 | 327 | −92 | 26 |
| 6 | Imperia-Dynamo Penza | 11 | 5 | 0 | 6 | 244 | 229 | +15 | 26 |
| 7 | Fili Moscow | 14 | 2 | 0 | 12 | 167 | 619 | −452 | 20 |
| 8 | Spartak Moscow | 12 | 2 | 0 | 10 | 121 | 448 | −327 | 18 |
