= Rugby Federation of Armenia =

Rugby union governing body in Armenia

Hajastani Regbii Federatsia
- Sport: Rugby union
- Founded: 2000
- Rugby Europe affiliation: 2002 Associate Member (suspended in 2014)
- President: Yuri Beglaryan
- Men's coach: Laurent Hairabetian (player-coach)
- Website: www.armrugby.am (archived)

The Rugby Federation of Armenia (Armenian: Հայաստան Ռեգբիի ֆեդերացիա, Hajastani Regbii Federatsia; Russian: Федерация регби Армении, Federatsiya Regbi Armenii) is the governing body for rugby union in Armenia. It is headquartered in Yerevan.

It was founded in 2000 and joined FIRA-AER (now Rugby Europe) as an associate member in 2002. Rugby Europe suspended the Rugby Federation of Armenia in November 2014 due to inactivity.

== History ==
Rugby was first played in the country in the 1960s, when Armenia was a republic within the Soviet Union. Armenia had its own representative team within the USSR, although it was not considered to be a proper national side. Armenian clubs including Yerevan Dinamo RC and Yerevan Spartak RC played in the top division of Soviet Championship and Soviet Cup. The rugby teams were disbanded due to the effects of the first Nagorno-Karabakh War and economic difficulties in Armenia during first years of independence in the early 1990s.

Rugby in Armenia went into hibernation for almost a decade until the founding of the Rugby Federation of Armenia (RFA) in 2000. Gagik Panikian become the RFA president in 2002 and the RFA joined FIRA-AER (now Rugby Europe) later that year. National teams for sevens and fifteen-a-side were soon formed to play in European competitions.

As of 2012, there were three rugby clubs in Armenia: Ararat, Artashat, and Ureni. Rugby Europe suspended the Rugby Federation of Armenia due to inactivity in 2014.

== National teams ==
- Armenia - the national men's rugby union team was formed in 2004 and was largely drawn from players of Armenian heritage in France. The team played at the 2004 European Championships, defeating Norway and Israel.
- Armenia 7s - the national men's rugby union seven-a-side team was formed in 2003.

== See also ==
- Armenia national rugby union team
- Rugby union in Armenia
