= Yenisey-STM Krasnoyarsk =

Russian rugby union club

(Russia) Yenisey-STM
- Full name: Регбийный клуб «Енисей-СТМ» (Regbiyniyy klub "Yenisei-STM")
- Founded: 1975; 51 years ago
- Location: Krasnoyarsk
- Ground(s): Avangard Stadium (Capacity: 2,643); Central Stadium (Capacity: 15,000)
- Director of Rugby: Alexander Pervukhin
- Coach: Vakil Valeev
- Captain: Uldis Saulite
- League: Professional Rugby League
1st kit	2nd kit

Official website
- www.enisei-stm.ru

Yenisey-STM Rugby Club is a Russian rugby union club founded in 1975. It is one of the two powerful Krasnoyarsk clubs, the other being their cross town rivals Krasny Yar. They participate in the Professional Rugby League, the premier rugby championship of Russia, and in 2015–16 qualified for the European Rugby Challenge Cup, making them the first Russian rugby union club ever to compete in a major European club competition. With an operating budget of €3.5m they are largest club in Russia.

== History ==
The club was founded in 1975 as Trud Krasnoyarsk (Russian: Труд, "labour"), but in 1978 was renamed Sibtyazhmash Krasnoyarsk (Russian: Сибтяжмаш). It took its current name on 12 April 2000. STM is an abbreviation for Sibtyazhmash ("Siberian Heavy Machinery", a local firm), while the Yenisei is the river that flows through Krasnoyarsk. The club competed in the European Rugby Challenge Cup since 2015–16 season. Enisei-STM is a two-time holder of the European Rugby Continental Shield. They are the first club outside of England, France, Ireland and Wales, which has won any European competition. Also Enisei-STM is the only owner of the European trophy, which is geographically based in Asia.

=== Siberian derby ===
Krasny Yar and Enisei-STM are based on the left and right banks of the Yenisei River. The first city derby took place on 1990, when the Enisei-STM rose from the lower leagues to the Soviet Championship. Krasny Yar played at the highest level since 1977. In the 1990s, the derby passed with the advantage of Krasny Yar. But since the 00's, Enisei-STM was able to reverse the course of history. The Siberian derby took place in Krasnoyarsk, Abakan, Shushenskoye, Chita, Moscow, Simferopol, Krasnodar and Edinburgh. At the moment (June 27, 2022), 144 games were played in the Russian Championship, the Russian Cup, the Russian Supercup and the European Rugby Continental Shield. Enisei-STM won 80 times, Krasny Yar won 60 times, 4 matches ended in a draw. Since 2016, the winner of the first derby of the season has been awarded the Nikolaev Cup in honor of the legendary Krasnoyarsk rugby player and coach Yuri Nikolaev (1962–2013).

== Honours ==
- Russian Championships (12): 1999, 2002, 2005, 2011, 2012, 2014, 2016, 2017, 2018, 2019, 2020–21, 2021-22
- Runner-up (10): 2000, 2001, 2003, 2004, 2007, 2009, 2010, 2013, 2015, 2023
- Russian Cup (9): 2000, 2001, 2008, 2014, 2016, 2017, 2020, 2021, 2022
- Russian Supercup (3): 2014, 2015, 2017
- Nikolaev Cup (5): 2016, 2017, 2018, 2021, 2022
- European Rugby Continental Shield (2): 2016–17, 2017–18

== Record in European Games ==
Opponent	Country	Competition	Played	Wins	Draws	Losses	Points For	Points Against	Points Difference
CDUL	(Portugal)	European Rugby Continental Shield	1	1	0	0	28	6	+22
Mogliano	(Italy)	European Rugby Continental Shield	3	3	0	0	116	22	+94
CSM Baia Mare	(Romania)	European Rugby Continental Shield	2	2	0	0	63	32	+31
Rovigo Delta	(Italy)	European Rugby Continental Shield	2	2	0	0	70	5	+65
Krasny Yar	(Russia)	European Rugby Continental Shield	3	3	0	0	110	56	+54
Heidelberger RK	(Germany)	European Rugby Continental Shield	1	1	0	0	24	20	+4
Timișoara Saracens	(Romania)	European Rugby Continental Shield	2	1	0	1	58	52	+6
Connacht	(Republic of Ireland)	European Rugby Challenge Cup	2	0	0	2	19	78	-59
Newcastle Falcons	(England)	European Rugby Challenge Cup	4	1	0	3	57	159	-102
Brive	(France)	European Rugby Challenge Cup	4	1	0	3	39	121	-82
Worcester Warriors	(England)	European Rugby Challenge Cup	4	1	0	3	57	192	-135
Dragons	(Wales)	European Rugby Challenge Cup	6	1	0	5	96	191	-95
Bordeaux Bègles	(France)	European Rugby Challenge Cup	2	0	0	2	44	93	-49
La Rochelle	(France)	European Rugby Challenge Cup	2	0	0	2	47	146	-99
Zebre	(Italy)	European Rugby Challenge Cup	2	0	0	2	28	89	-61
Bristol Bears	(England)	European Rugby Challenge Cup	2	0	0	2	28	172	-144
Castres	(France)	European Rugby Challenge Cup	2	0	0	2	22	50	-28
Lokomotiv	(Russia)	Rugby Europe Super Cup	2	2	0	0	66	27	+39
Tel Aviv Heat	(Israel)	Rugby Europe Super Cup	2	1	0	1	65	65	0
Black Lion	(Georgia (country))	Rugby Europe Super Cup	1	0	0	1	20	27	-7

== Wins against Tier 1 pro teams ==
Date	Home	Score	Away	Venue	Status
12 December 2015	Enisey-STM	10–7	Brive	(Russia) Sochi Central Stadium, Sochi	2015–16 European Rugby Challenge Cup
16 January 2016	Enisey-STM	24–7	Newcastle Falcons	(Russia) Sochi Central Stadium, Sochi	2015–16 European Rugby Challenge Cup
15 October 2016	Enisey-STM	19–12	Worcester Warriors	(Russia) Slava Stadium, Moscow	2016–17 European Rugby Challenge Cup
22 October 2016	Enisey-STM	38–18	Newport Gwent Dragons	(Russia) Trud Stadium, Krasnodar	2016–17 European Rugby Challenge Cup

== Club staff ==
Head coach – Alexander Pervukhin (Russia)

Assistant coach – Vakil Valeev (Russia)

Forwards coach – Roman Romak (Russia)

Backs coach – Rynhardt van As (South Africa)

Head of Strength and Conditioning coach – Igor Vashkevich (Russia)

Fitness coach – Andrey Mosolov (Russia)

Reserve team Head coach – Yuri Krasnobaev (Russia)

== Current squad ==
2022 Rugby Premier League

Enisey-STM
Pos.	Nat.	Name	Date of birth (age)	Caps	Former club
HK	(Russia)	Shamil Magomedov	17 April 1987 (age 39)	10	(Russia) RC Kuban
HK	(South Africa)	Francois Esterhuyzen	16 November 1994 (age 31)		(Russia) Dinamo Moscow
HK	(Russia)	Evgeny Malyshkin	17 January 1998 (age 28)		homegrown player
PR	(Russia)	Innokenty Zykov	25 May 1981 (age 45)	47	homegrown player
PR	(Russia)	Azamat Bitiev	9 December 1989 (age 36)	25	(Russia) Krasny Yar
PR	(South Africa)	NJ Oosthuizen	19 November 1996 (age 29)		(South Africa) Griquas
PR	(Russia)	Stepan Seryakov	26 September 1997 (age 28)	1	homegrown player
PR	(Russia)	Ramazan Aliev	20 January 1999 (age 27)		homegrown player
PR	(Russia)	Nikita Baryshnikov	1 April 1999 (age 27)		homegrown player
PR	(Russia)	Vladimir Tonkoshkurov	27 June 1999 (age 27)		homegrown player
PR	(Russia)	Dmitry Sipkin	25 February 2000 (age 26)		homegrown player
LK	(Latvia)	Uldis Saulīte	28 September 1980 (age 45)	28	(Latvia) Jelgavas Aļņi
LK	(Russia)	Evgeny Elgin	10 March 1987 (age 39)	32	homegrown player
LK	(Russia)	Maxim Gargalic	7 March 1989 (age 37)	2	(Russia) Strela
LK	(Russia)	Anton Makarenko	7 December 1991 (age 34)	2	(Russia) Bulava Taganrog
LK	(Russia)	Vitaly Klimov	1 December 1995 (age 30)	1	(Russia) RC Kuban
FL	(Russia)	Andrey Temnov	1 January 1983 (age 43)	59	(Russia) Slava Moscow
FL	(Russia)	Dmitry Krotov	14 January 1992 (age 34)	22	homegrown player
FL	(Russia)	Maksim Kemaev	27 February 2001 (age 25)		homegrown player
N8	(South Africa)	Carel du Preez	30 April 1993 (age 33)		(South Africa) Pumas
N8	(Russia)	Vitaly Nemtsev	6 March 1997 (age 29)		homegrown player
SH	(Russia)	Alexey Shcherban	17 November 1990 (age 35)	50	homegrown player
SH	(Russia)	Konstantin Uzunov	19 April 1994 (age 32)	23	homegrown player
SH	(Russia)	Aleksandr Belosludtsev	7 February 2001 (age 25)	1	homegrown player
FH	(Russia)	Ramil Gaisin	26 July 1991 (age 35)	61	homegrown player
FH	(Russia)	Alexandr Budychenko	9 September 1997 (age 28)	13	homegrown player
FH	(Russia)	Timur Maslov	7 March 2000 (age 26)		homegrown player
FH	(Russia)	Kirill Gavrichkov	14 February 2003 (age 23)		homegrown player
CE	(Latvia)	Jurijs Baranovs	11 December 1981 (age 44)	?
CE	(Russia)	Dmitry Gerasimov	16 April 1988 (age 38)	73	homegrown player
CE	(Russia)	Denis Simplikevich	11 March 1991 (age 35)	30	(Russia) Metallurg
CE	(Russia)	Viktor Kononov	26 May 1996 (age 30)	6	homegrown player
CE	(Russia)	Alexandr Matveev	1 February 1999 (age 27)		homegrown player
CE	(Russia)	Alexey Bernauchis	4 March 2000 (age 26)		homegrown player
CE	(Russia)	Denis Semikov	10 March 2001 (age 25)	2	homegrown player
WG	(Russia)	Alexey Mikhaltsov	6 November 1991 (age 34)	11	homegrown player
WG	(Georgia (country))	Davit Meskhi	20 September 1997 (age 28)	2	(Georgia (country)) RC Army
WG	(Russia)	Khetag Dzobelov	5 July 1998 (age 28)	4	(Russia) Strela
WG	(Russia)	Artyom Rovsky	24 March 2000 (age 26)		homegrown player
FB	(Russia)	Nikita Churashov	11 February 1996 (age 30)	4	homegrown player
FB	(Russia)	Danil Zabolotnykh	25 April 1999 (age 27)		homegrown player

=== International honours ===
- (Russia) Viacheslav Grachev
- (Russia) Anton Rudoy
- (Russia) Yuri Kushnarev
- (Russia) Denis Simplikevich
- (Russia) Stanislav Sel'skiy
- (Russia) Dmitry Gerasimov
- (Russia) Ramil Gaisin
- (Russia) Valery Morozov
- (Russia) Vladimir Ostroushko
- (Russia) Valery Tsnobiladze
- (Russia) Andrei Polivalov
- (Russia) Evgeny Elgin
- (Russia) Evgeny Pronenko
- (Russia) Sergey Novoselov
- (Russia) Alexei Korobeynikov
- (Russia) Roman Romak
- (Russia) Vitaly Zeer
- (Russia) Nazir Gasanov
- (Russia) Alexander Bezverkhov
- (Russia) Vladimir Botvinnikov
- (Russia) Dmitry Krotov
- (Russia) Konstantin Uzunov
- (Russia) Pavel Butenko
- (Russia) Alexey Mikhaltsov
- (Russia) Alexey Tolstykh
- (Russia) Sergey Kuzmenko
- (Russia) Pavel Novikov
- (Russia) Yaroslav Rechnev
- (Russia) Andrey Temnov
- (Russia) Innokenty Zykov
- (Russia) Alexey Shcherban
- (South Africa) Bjorn Basson
- (Georgia (country)) Rati Urushadze
- (Georgia (country)) Davit Kacharava
- (Georgia (country)) Shalva Mamukashvili
- (Georgia (country)) Mikheil Gachechiladze
- (Ukraine) Veacheslav Krasilnik
- (Ukraine) Vitaly Orlov
- (Latvia) Uldis Saulīte
- (Latvia) Jurijs Baranovs
- (Moldova) Dmitri Arhip
- (Moldova) Maxim Gargalic
