= Rugby Union of Russia =

Governing body for rugby union in Russia

Союз регбистов России
- Sport: Rugby union
- Founded: 1936; 90 years ago
- World Rugby affiliation: 1990 (suspended)
- Rugby Europe (suspended) affiliation: 1992
- President: Igor Artemyev
- Women's coach: Pavel Baranovsky
- Website: rugby.ru

Rugby Union of Russia (RUR) (Russian: Союз регбистов России, romanized: Soyuz regbistov Rossii) is the governing body for rugby union in Russia. It was founded in 1936 originally as the Rugby Federation of the Soviet Union (RFSU). The Rugby Union of Russia became affiliated to World Rugby (previously known as the International Rugby Football Board, and still later as the International Rugby Board) in 1990.

== History ==
Rugby union was introduced to Russia in the 1880s but the Tsarist police banned it on the belief it would incite violence. The ban was lifted in 1923 following the establishment of the Soviet Union. In 1934, the Rugby Federation of the Soviet Union was founded with it creating the Soviet Championship as a national league in 1936. In 1948, the Premier of the Soviet Union, Josef Stalin banned rugby in the Soviet Union on the grounds that it was "not relevant to the principles of the Soviet people". The Rugby Federation was dissolved until it was re-founded in 1966. The Soviet Union were invited to the inaugural 1987 Rugby World Cup but the Soviet government declined the invitation on the political grounds that the apartheid backed South African Rugby Board were still members of the IRFB. The RFSU formally joined the IRFB in 1990.

In the early 1990s, the Soviets started playing test rugby. Following the dissolution of the Soviet Union, the RFSU reorganised into the Rugby Union of Russia in 1992. In 2003, Russia were disqualified from qualifying for the 2003 Rugby World Cup due to playing ineligible South African players. As a result, the RUR moved its base from Krasnoyarsk to Moscow and formed a new Russian Rugby Championship after new investment. After the Russian invasion of Ukraine, World Rugby and Rugby Europe suspended Russia from international and European continental rugby union competition. In addition, the Rugby Union of Russia was suspended from World Rugby and Rugby Europe.

== Aims ==
The Rugby Union of Russia set a goal for the Russian national team to qualify for the 2011 Rugby World Cup in New Zealand, and make their first appearance in the tournament. The team succeeded, qualifying as Europe 2 in Pool C. Further ahead, they targeted being a top twelve rugby playing nation by 2015, and reaching the quarter-finals stage of the 2019 Rugby World Cup in Japan. Though they failed to qualify for 2015 and only qualified for 2019 by default due to several European teams being disqualified for fielding ineligible players.

== See also ==
- Russia national rugby union team
- Rugby union in Russia
