= Rugby union in Armenia =

- Governing body: Rugby Federation of Armenia
- First played: 1960s

Rugby union in Armenia is a growing sport. The national team is currently unranked in the world rankings, which records only the top ninety-six countries. The governing body for Armenia is the Rugby Federation of Armenia, headquartered in Yerevan.

== Governing body ==
The governing body is the Rugby Federation of Armenia. It was founded in 2000 and joined the FIRA-AER (now Rugby Europe) as an associate member in 2002. Rugby Europe suspended the Rugby Federation of Armenia in November 2014 due to inactivity.

== History ==
Rugby union in Armenia has not been popular historically, but the neighbouring Caucasus country, Georgia has a strong rugby culture in competition at the international level including at the Rugby World Cup. Rugby was introduced to both Georgia and Armenia by Jacques Haspekian, an Armenian from Marseille, France.

The first rugby games were played in the country in the 1960s, when Armenia was a Soviet republic. Rugby had been played in the Russian Empire as early as 1908, and the first Soviet Championship took place in the 1930s. The game was forbidden in the USSR in 1948, but rugby competitions were eventually resumed in 1957. The Soviet Championship was reinstated in 1966, with Armenian club, Yerevan Dinamo RC, joining the top division. Armenia had its own representative team within the USSR, although it was not considered to be a proper national side.

=== Rugby in the Soviet era: 1960s to 1990 ===
Jacques Haspekian, part of the large Armenian diaspora in France, went to Armenia in the late 1950s. As a rugby enthusiast, he submitted a proposal to the Armenian Sports Committee to begin the development of rugby in the country. He did not gain approval as rugby was still regarded as a bourgeois sport by the regime, so he went to Georgia instead. Aspikian was to be one of the founders of rugby union in Georgia, later to become the strongest rugby region in the former USSR.

In 1963, Aspikian returned to Armenia and staged an exhibition match at Yerevan between two Georgian teams. The game generated suitable interest in rugby and led to the foundation of Yerevan's first rugby competition in 1965. Rugby teams were formed in Yerevan's main sporting clubs of Dinamo, Spartak, Ashxatanq, and Burevestnik, and the game was also played by several universities. In the 1966–67 season, the Yerevan Dinamo Rugby Club entered the top division of the Soviet Championship. The national team of Armenia was formed at this time, with players largely drawn from the Dinamo team.

The Yerevan Spartak Rugby Club took Dinamo's place in the Soviet Championships in 1972. In a later season, Spartak reached the quarter-final stages of the Soviet Cup. However, the rugby teams were disbanded by the early 1990s due to the effects of the Armenia-Azerbaijan War and economic difficulties in Armenia following the demise of the Soviet Union. Armenia gained its independence from the USSR in 1991, but rugby went into hibernation in the country for almost a decade.

=== Rugby since independence: 1991 onwards ===
Rugby was re-established in Armenia in the year 2000, with the founding of the Rugby Federation of Armenia (RFA). Gagik Panikian became the RFA president in 2002 and pledged to improve the popularity of the sport and the quality of players Armenia produced. The RFA joined FIRA-AER (now Rugby Europe) as an associate member later in 2002. An Armenian 7s team and an Armenian national team were soon formed, largely drawn from players of Armenian heritage in France. The 15-man side played at the 2004 European Championships, defeating Norway and Israel.

== Recent events ==
In 2014, Rugby Europe suspended the Rugby Federation of Armenia due to inactivity.

== Clubs ==
As of 2012, there were three rugby clubs in Armenia: Ararat, Artashat, and Ureni.

== See also ==
- Armenia national rugby union team
- Sports in Armenia
