= Lokomotiv Penza =

Russian rugby union club

(Russia) Lokomotiv
- Full name: Регбийный клуб «Локомотив Пенза» (Regbiyniyy klub "Lokomotiv Penza")
- Founded: 2018; 8 years ago
- Location: Penza
- Ground: Pervomaysky Stadium (Capacity: 5,182)
- Chairman: Igor Barmapov
- Director of Rugby: Alexander Yanyushkin
- Captain: Sergey Yanyushkin
- League: Professional Rugby League
- 2022–23: 1
Team kit

Official website
- www.rugbylokomotiv.ru

Lokomotiv is a Russian rugby union club from Penza. It is the professional section of Imperia-Dynamo Penza, an amateur rugby club. Founded at November 2018.

== Current squad ==
2022 Rugby Premier League

Lokomotiv
Pos.	Nat.	Name	Date of birth (age)	Caps	Former club
HK	(South Africa)	Tiaan van der Merwe	4 April 1998 (age 27)		(South Africa) Leopards
HK	(Russia)	Pavel Zhilyaev	19 July 1999 (age 26)		homegrown player
PR	(Russia)	Andrey Polivalov	9 August 1986 (age 39)	25	(Russia) VVA
PR	(Russia)	Sergey Sekisov	19 November 1986 (age 39)	27	(Russia) VVA
PR	(Russia)	Mikhail Smagin	26 April 1993 (age 32)		homegrown player
PR	(Russia)	Vladimir Podrezov	27 January 1994 (age 32)	36	(Russia) VVA
PR	(Russia)	Alexandr Ryabov	8 April 2000 (age 25)		(Russia) RC Kuban
LK	(Russia)	Vadim Zharkov	2 August 1995 (age 30)	1	homegrown player
LK	(Russia)	German Silenko	9 August 1995 (age 30)	3	(Russia) Metallurg
LK	(Russia)	Bogdan Kireev	27 March 2001 (age 24)		(Russia) Krasny Yar
FL	(Russia)	Alexey Bashev	3 July 1995 (age 30)		(Russia) Metallurg
FL	(Russia)	Alexey Nastavshev	4 June 1999 (age 26)		(Russia) Rostov
FL	(Russia)	Vladimir Geraskin	21 May 2000 (age 25)		(Russia) RC Kuban
N8	(Russia)	Victor Gresev	31 March 1986 (age 39)	106	(Russia) Krasny Yar
N8	(South Africa)	Stephan de Wit	1 January 1992 (age 34)		(Russia) VVA
N8	(Georgia (country))	Ilia Spanderashvili	10 September 1997 (age 28)	2	(Georgia (country)) Armazi
SH	(Russia)	Rushan Yagudin	29 March 1987 (age 38)	18	(Russia) Metallurg
SH	(South Africa)	Rudi van Rooyen	5 January 1992 (age 34)		(South Africa) Southern Kings
FH	(Russia)	Sergey Yanyushkin	16 November 1986 (age 39)	17	(Russia) VVA
FH	(Russia)	Dmitry Sukhin	15 January 1995 (age 31)		(Russia) Krasny Yar
CE	(Russia)	Andrey Karzanov	25 November 1990 (age 35)	4	(Russia) Druzhyna Berdsk
CE	(Russia)	Vladislav Sozonov	9 October 1993 (age 32)	13	(Russia) VVA
CE	(Georgia (country))	Nika Tserekidze	22 November 1994 (age 31)		(Georgia (country)) Kochebi
WG	(Russia)	Ilya Babaev	10 January 1989 (age 37)		(Russia) VVA
WG	(Russia)	Valery Khlutkov	18 September 1991 (age 34)		(Russia) Druzhyna Berdsk
WG	(Russia)	Ivan Ovchinnikov	5 July 1996 (age 29)		(Russia) Zastava
WG	(Russia)	Pavel Golik	10 January 1997 (age 29)		(Russia) Zastava
WG	(Russia)	Daniil Potikhanov	30 November 1999 (age 26)	4	(Russia) VVA
FB	(Russia)	Aleksandr Gudok	3 June 1991 (age 34)		(Russia) VVA
FB	(Russia)	Pavel Kuraev	17 June 1998 (age 27)		homegrown player

== Record in European Games ==
Opponent	Country	Competition	Played	Wins	Draws	Losses	Points For	Points Against	Points Difference
Enisey-STM	(Russia)	Rugby Europe Super Cup	2	0	0	2	27	66	-39
Black Lion	(Georgia (country))	Rugby Europe Super Cup	2	1	0	1	30	43	-13
Tel Aviv Heat	(Israel)	Rugby Europe Super Cup	2	0	0	2	37	62	-25

== Honours ==
=== Rugby 7 Russian Championship ===
Champions: 2019, 2022, 2023.

=== Rugby Union Russian Championship ===
Champions: 2022/2023.
