= Tiaan van der Merwe =

South African rugby union player

- Full name: Tiaan van der Merwe
- Born: 4 April 1998 (age 28) Johannesburg, South Africa
- Height: 1.85 m (6 ft 1 in)
- Weight: 104 kg (229 lb; 16 st 5 lb)
- School: Helpmekaar Kollege

Rugby union career
- Position: Hooker
- Current team: Lokomotiv Penza
Youth career
- 2014–2018: Golden Lions
Senior career
Years	Team	Apps	(Points)
2018	Golden Lions	1	(0)
2019	Golden Lions XV	3	(0)
2021–2022	Griquas	1	(0)
2022	→ Leopards	8	(15)
2022–	Lokomotiv Penza	17	(75)
- Correct as of 19 March 2024
International career
Years	Team	Apps	(Points)
2018	South Africa Under-20	2	(5)
- Correct as of 19 March 2024

Tiaan van der Merwe (born 4 April 1998) is a South African rugby union player for the Lokomotiv Penza in the Russian Rugby Championship. His regular position is hooker.
