= Monino =

Monino Монино
- Urban-type settlement
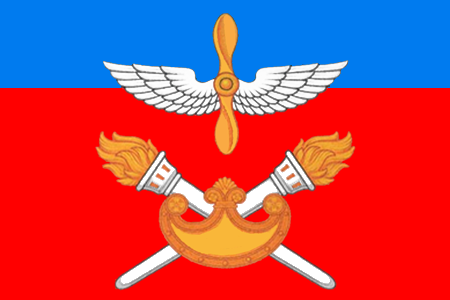
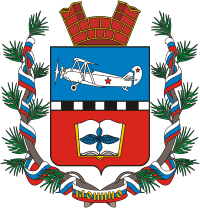
- Flag Coat of arms
- Interactive map of Monino
- Location of Monino Monino (Moscow Oblast)
- Coordinates: 55°50′24″N 38°11′53″E
- Country: Russia
- Federal subject: Moscow Oblast
- Administrative district: Shchyolkovsky District
- Elevation: 157 m (515 ft)

Population (2010 Census)
  - Total: 22,821
  - Estimate (2026): 20,726 (−9.2%)
- Time zone: UTC+3 (MSK)
- Postal codes: 141170, 141171
- OKTMO ID: 46659154051
- Website: www.monino.ru

Monino (Russian: Мо́нино) is an urban locality (a work settlement) in Shchyolkovsky District of Moscow Oblast, Russia, located 23 kilometers (14 mi) east of Moscow. Population: 22,821 (2010 census); 20,017 (2002 census); 18,582 (1989 Soviet census).

== History ==
Monino was founded in the Muninskaya Wasteland (Russian: Мунинская пустошь) on August 23, 1792. The name "Monino" or "Munin" can be translated from the Finno-Ugric languages as "My farm".

It is alleged that the history of the settlement can be traced to a small farm, whose owner was a man of Monin. In 1926, an airfield for heavy aircraft was built, becoming the first to house a heavy bomber brigade. The subsequent history of the village is closely connected with aviation. The status of urban-type settlement was conferred in 1946.

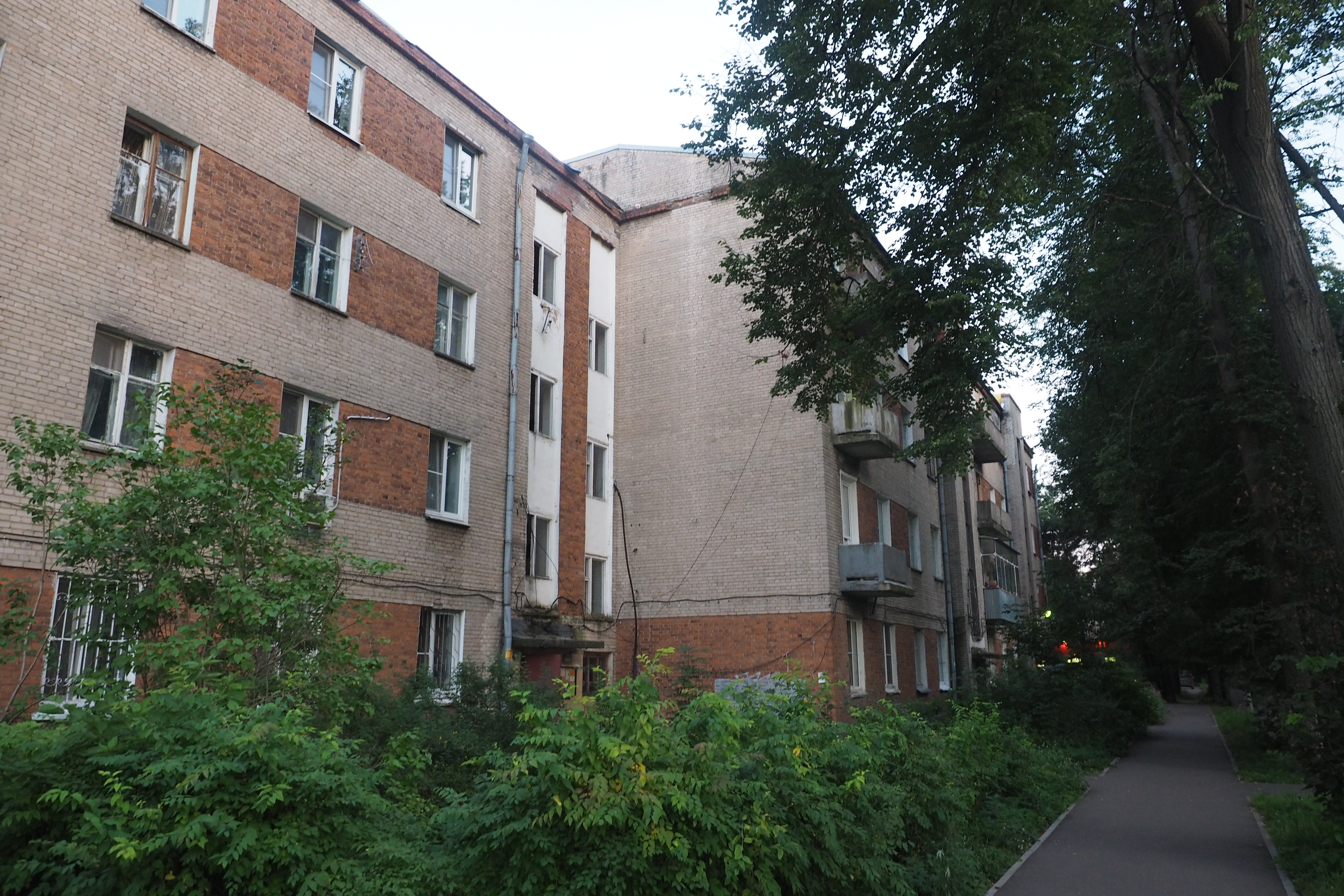
1920s apartments in Monino

Until 1965, it was part of the Noginsk District.

== Trivia ==
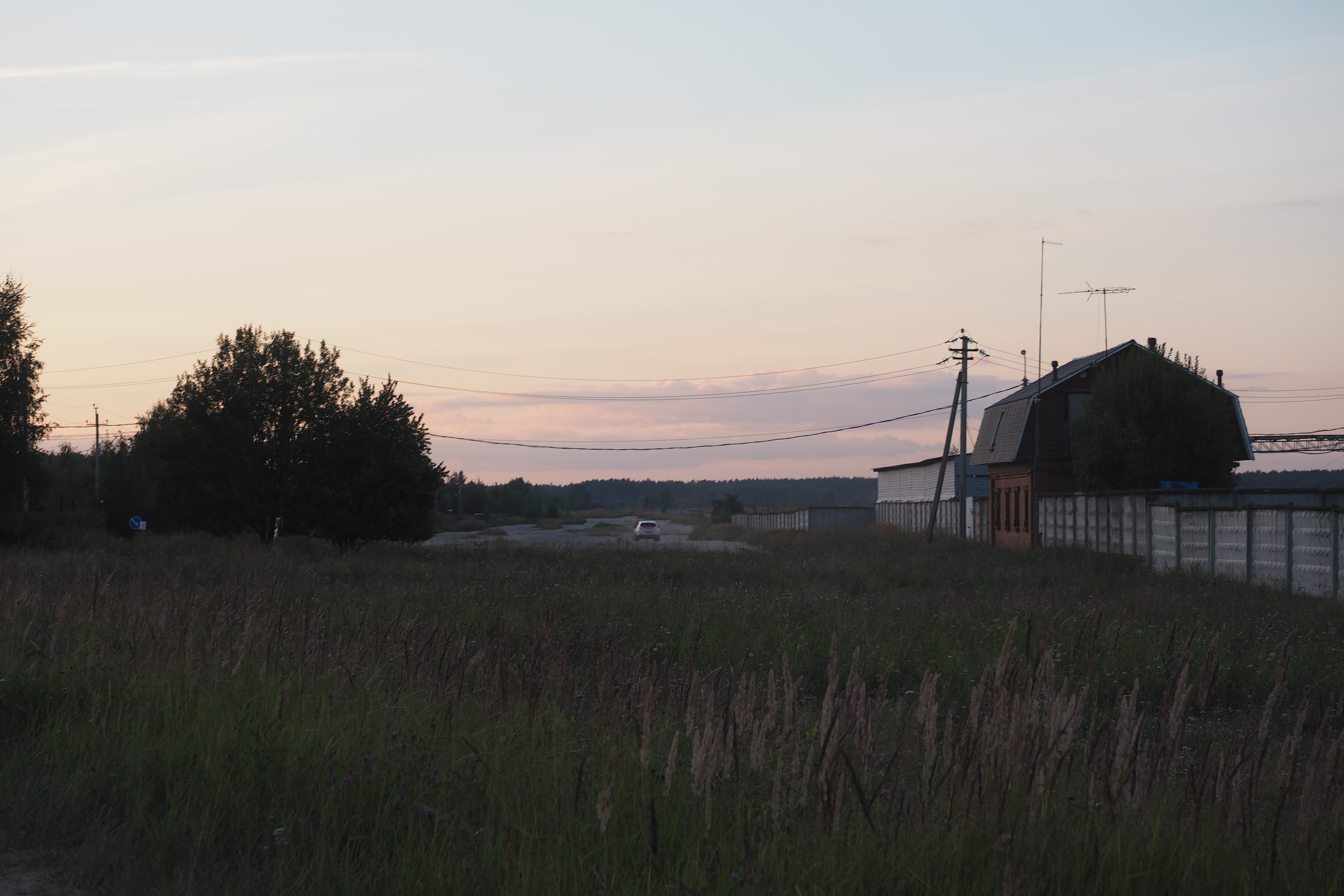
Abandoned Monino airfield (2020)

The Central Air Force Museum in Monino is one of the world's largest aviation museums, and the largest for Russian aircraft. 173 aircraft and 127 aircraft engines are on display, and the museum also features collections of weapons, instruments, uniforms, artwork, and other air-related items. A library containing books, films, and photos is also accessible to visitors. Tours are given by ex-pilots. The museum opened its doors in 1958.

Offered by the museum is a guided tour narrated by a presenter in English, in which visitors will learn about the history of the Armed Forces from the 14th century to the present day and see authentic exhibits that convey the spirit of different eras: a 14th-century sword, a naval artillery gun from the era of Peter the Great, a Fiat Izhorsky armored car, a fragment of the wall of the Brest Fortress, learn about the feat of V.V. Talalikhin and see the tail section of the German Heinkel-111 bomber he shot down.

The second half of the 20th century will appear before the visitor in models of the first Soviet atomic bombs, fragments of an American U-2 reconnaissance aircraft shot down over the territory of the USSR, exhibits that tell about the development of new branches of the armed forces and the post-Soviet history of the Russian Armed Forces.

Monino was the former home of the Gagarin Air Force Academy, which closed in 2011 and remains home to the Chernoi air base.

Monino is home to VVA-Podmoskovye, current champions of the Professional Rugby League, Russia's national rugby union competition. VVA have won the title eight times, in 1993, 2003, 2004, 2006, 2007, 2008, 2009, and 2010. They are also nine-time winners of the Soviet Championship.

Monino can be reached from the Yaroslavsky Rail Terminal in central Moscow by the suburban elektrichka commuter train.
