= 2005 Russian Professional Rugby League season =

2005 Professional Rugby League season
- Countries: Russia

This was the first season of the new Russian Professional Rugby League, replacing the former Super League.

Pos	Team	Pld	W	D	L	PF	PA	PD	Pts
1	Yenisey-STM Krasnoyarsk	20	17	0	3	676	244	+432	71
2	VVA-Podmoskovye Monino	20	16	1	3	586	259	+327	65
3	Krasny Yar Krasnoyarsk	20	13	1	6	471	360	+111	60
4	Slava Moscow	20	7	0	13	298	491	−193	41
5	RC Penza	20	5	0	15	281	515	−234	35
6	RC Novokuznetsk	20	1	0	19	184	627	−443	22
