= Soviet Cup (rugby union) =

The Soviet Cup was a rugby union club competition between the domestic teams of the Soviet Union era. The first competition was held in 1976, and continued on an annual basis until 1990.

== Results ==
| Year | Winner | Score | Runner-up |
|---|---|---|---|
| 1976 | (Russian Soviet Federative Socialist Republic) VVA | 10 - 6 | (Georgian Soviet Socialist Republic) Locomotivi (Tbilisi) |
| 1977 | (Russian Soviet Federative Socialist Republic) Fili Moscow | 7 - 0 | (Russian Soviet Federative Socialist Republic) Primorets (Leningrad) |
| 1978 | (Georgian Soviet Socialist Republic) Locomotivi (Tbilisi) | 30 - 3 | (Russian Soviet Federative Socialist Republic) Slava Moscow |
| 1979 | (Ukrainian Soviet Socialist Republic) Aviator Kiev | 24 - 0 | (Ukrainian Soviet Socialist Republic) KPI (Kiev) |
| 1980 | (Russian Soviet Federative Socialist Republic) VVA | 19 - 6 | (Russian Soviet Federative Socialist Republic) Lokomotiv Moscow |
| 1981 | (Russian Soviet Federative Socialist Republic) Slava Moscow | 9 - 6 | (Russian Soviet Federative Socialist Republic) Lokomotiv Moscow |
| 1982 | (Ukrainian Soviet Socialist Republic) Aviator Kiev | 9 - 3 | (Russian Soviet Federative Socialist Republic) VVA |
| 1983 | (Russian Soviet Federative Socialist Republic) VVA | 12 - 3 | (Russian Soviet Federative Socialist Republic) Slava Moscow |
| 1984 | (Ukrainian Soviet Socialist Republic) Aviator Kiev | 15 - 9 | (Russian Soviet Federative Socialist Republic) Slava Moscow |
| 1985 | (Russian Soviet Federative Socialist Republic) Slava Moscow | 21 - 10 | (Russian Soviet Federative Socialist Republic) Lokomotiv Moscow |
| 1986 | (Russian Soviet Federative Socialist Republic) VVA | 9 - 6 | (Russian Soviet Federative Socialist Republic) Lokomotiv Moscow |
| 1987 | (Georgian Soviet Socialist Republic) AIA Kutaisi | 12 - 3 | (Russian Soviet Federative Socialist Republic) VVA |
| 1988 | (Kazakh Soviet Socialist Republic) SKA Alma-Ata | 12 - 6 | (Russian Soviet Federative Socialist Republic) Slava Moscow |
| 1989 | (Russian Soviet Federative Socialist Republic) Slava Moscow | 12 - 3 | (Russian Soviet Federative Socialist Republic) Krasny Yar |
| 1990 | (Georgian Soviet Socialist Republic) AIA Kutaisi | 13 - 10 | (Kazakh Soviet Socialist Republic) SKA Alma-Ata |

== Results by republic ==
| Republic | Winner | Runner-up |
|---|---|---|
| Russian SFSR | 8 | 12 |
| Georgian SSR | 3 | 1 |
| Ukrainian SSR | 3 | 1 |
| Kazakh SSR | 1 | 1 |

== See also ==
- Soviet Championship
- Professional Rugby League
