= Armenia national rugby union team =

National rugby union team

Armenia Հայաստան
- Union: Rugby Federation of Armenia
- Emblem: Mount Ararat
- Ground: Abovyan City Stadium
- Coach: (Armenia) Laurent Hairabetian (player-coach)
- Captain: Alain Tchurukdichian
Team kit	Change kit

First international
- Armenia 36 – 6 Norway (2 June 2004)

Largest win
- Armenia 48 – 0 Israel (5 June 2004)

Largest defeat
- Andorra 36 – 10 Armenia (21 March 2009)

The Armenian national rugby union team began playing in the European Nations Cup in 2004. However, Rugby Europe suspended the Rugby Federation of Armenia in November 2014 due to inactivity.

The team had been unexpectedly strong due to the large Armenian diaspora in France (as well as other traditionally strong rugby nations). So the team has drawn many players, coaches, and trainers from this experienced pool. The team was undefeated since debuting in European competition in 2004 until 1 October 2006, when they lost to Switzerland 16–29 in Vienne (France). The coach is Laurent Hairabetian. Prior to that loss they had won ten tests in a row progressing up the FIRA-AER divisions until reaching Division 3A in the European Nations Cup tournament.

== Record ==
Below is a table of the representative rugby matches played by a Greece national XV at test level up until 28 May 2011, updated after match with Slovenia.

Opponent	Played	Won	Lost	Drawn	% Won
Andorra	3	2	1	0	66.67%
Belgium	1	1	0	0	100%
Bulgaria	1	1	0	0	100%
Denmark	2	2	0	0	100%
Hungary	1	1	0	0	100%
Israel	3	3	0	0	100%
Lithuania	2	1	1	0	50%
Luxembourg	1	1	0	0	100%
Norway	1	1	0	0	100%
Serbia	5	3	2	0	60%
Slovenia	2	2	0	0	100%
Sweden	2	1	1	0	50%
Switzerland	5	2	3	0	40%
Total	29	21	8	0	72.41%

== Undefeated streak (2004–2006) ==
- 2 June 2004 : Armenia 36 – 6 Norway (Div. 3C)
- 5 June 2004 : Armenia 48 – 0 Israel (Div. 3C)
- 20 October 2004 : Armenia 24 – 11 Belgium (friendly match)
- 7 April 2005 : Armenia 47 – 15 Israel (Div. 3)
- 11 June 2005 : Armenia 31 – 12 Israel (Div. 3)
- 1 October 2005 : Armenia 39 – 12 Luxembourg (Div. 3B/C Playoff)
- 12 November 2005 : Armenia 57 – 17 Bulgaria (Div. 3B)
- 29 April 2006 : Armenia 24 – 13 Hungary (Div. 3B)
- 13 May 2006 : Armenia 42 – 6 Slovenia (Div. 3B)
- 4 June 2006 : Armenia 18 – 3 Lithuania (Div. 3B)

== 2006–2008 European Nations Cup ==
Date	Match	Location	Result
30 September 2006	Armenia – Switzerland	Vienne	16–29
21 October 2006	Sweden – Armenia	Helsingborg	24–0
7 April 2007	Denmark – Armenia	Odense	3–11
1 September 2007	Armenia – Sweden	Bourgoin-Jallieu	16–12
6 October 2007	Armenia – Switzerland	Nyon	28–15
12 April 2008	Armenia – Denmark	Abovyan	24–13
10 May 2008	Armenia – Serbia	Abovyan	25–0
12 April 2008	Armenia – Serbia	Belgrade	8–19

FIRA-AER, ENC Division 3A standings

	MJ	V	N	D	Diff	Pts
1. Sweden	8	7	0	1	87	22
2. Armenia	8	5	0	3	13	18
3. Switzerland	8	4	0	4	24	16
4. Serbia	8	2	1	5	−69	13
5. Denmark	8	1	1	6	−55	11

== See also ==
- List of international rugby union teams
- Rugby union in Armenia
- Sports in Armenia
