= RC Aviator =

Ukrainian rugby union club, based in Kyiv

- Full name: Rugby Club Aviator
- Founded: 1963; 63 years ago
- Location: Kyiv, Ukraine
- Ground: Spartak Stadium
- Coach: Sergey Mina
Team kit

RC Aviator is a Ukrainian rugby union club in Kyiv.

== History ==
The club was founded in 1963.
