= Test match =

Test match in some sports refers to a sporting contest between national representative teams and may refer to:

- Test cricket
- Test match (indoor cricket)
- Test match (rugby union)
- Test match (rugby league)
- Test match (association football)
- Test match (netball)
- Test Match (board game), cricket-themed board game
