= Chernoye Airfield =

Chernoye
- IATA: none; ICAO: XUMH

Summary
- Owner/Operator: Moscow Aviation-Repair Plant DOSAAF
- Location: Fedurnovo, Balashikha, Moscow Oblast
- Elevation AMSL: 449 ft (137 m)
- Coordinates: 55°45′40″N 038°3′35″E
- Website: Official website

Map
- Shown within Moscow Oblast Chernoye (Russia)

Runways
Direction	Length		Surface
Direction	ft	m	Surface
03/21	3,281	1,000	Grass

Chernoye is a civilian airfield located near to Fedurnovo, Balashikha, Moscow Oblast, Russia.

It is home to the Moscow Aviation-Repair Plant DOSAAF which perform aviation maintenance on Mil Mi-2, Mil Mi-8 and Antonov An-2 aircraft.
