= Uldis Saulīte =

Latvian rugby union player

- Born: 28 September 1980 (age 46) Jelgava, Latvian SSR (now Latvia)
- Height: 1.99 m (6 ft 6 1/2 in)
- Weight: 117 kg (18 st 6 lb; 258 lb)

Rugby union career
- Position: Lock
Youth career
- 1996-1998: Aļņi Jelgava
Senior career
Years	Team	Apps	(Points)
1998-2000	Aļņi Jelgava	-	(-)
2001-2023	Enisei-STM	199	(140)
2015	RK Mītava	-	(-)
- Correct as of 25 January 2024
International career
Years	Team	Apps	(Points)
2001-2014	Latvia	28	(40)
2013	Russian Barbarians	1	(0)
- Correct as of 25 January 2024

Uldis Saulīte (born 28 September 1980) is a former Latvian rugby union footballer. He played as a lock.

== Career ==
Born in Jelgava, the young Uldis did not play the game until he was 16. Naturally big and strong, he soon caught the eye of a couple of former Latvian internationals, one of whom gave him the money to pay for the late bus home from training he could not otherwise have afforded. He grew steadily fitter and found rugby an enjoyable release from his day job as an apprentice carpenter.

Shortly after Uldis had turned 21, a Latvian referee based in Russia advised him that a club side in Siberia called Enisei-STM were trialling new players. Enisei are based in the city of Krasnoyarsk, where winter temperatures routinely dip to minus 40C. Something inside Uldis still fancied trying his luck 5,000 km east on the banks of the icy Yenisei river. On 2 January 2001, in the depths of a typically harsh Siberian winter, he arrived in Russia to pursue his dream.

The early days were predictably tough. The club's forwards coach ran a hotel and allowed him to stay rent free in exchange for basic chores but Uldis's rudimentary skills were not deemed good enough to earn an immediate contract. In just his second practice session he accidentally broke a first-team lock's collar-bone, which endeared him even less to his new teammates. He stayed put only because “I didn’t want to return to Latvia as a loser”. In order to discover the true depth of his resolve, the club's captain subsequently challenged the Latvian incomer to a fight. The latter's blunt refusal to back down convinced the squad it might be wiser to keep their 20 stone, 6 ft 6 in new recruit onside.

It still took six months before he received his first wage packet, which was seven times smaller than his carpenter salary in Latvia. “I wanted to play professional rugby so badly that it didn’t bother me at all.” In his first year of pro rugby he also lost 12 kg in weight but his committed displays at lock or Number 8 began to win over his Russian doubters. He also put his body on the line internationally for Latvia, once turning up to represent his national team despite recently-broken ribs. Rather than letting his country down, Uldis strapped himself up with a chunk of old bed mattress, had a pain-killing jab and played on. Back in his native Latvia they nicknamed their hero The Siberian Bear and took immense pride in his exploits.

=== Honours ===
- Russian Championships (11): 2002, 2005, 2011, 2012, 2014, 2016, 2017, 2018, 2019, 2020–21, 2021-22
- Russian Cup (6): 2009, 2014, 2016, 2017, 2020, 2021, 2022
- Russian Supercup (3): 2014, 2015, 2017
- European Rugby Continental Shield (2): 2016-17, 2017–18
