= Trud Stadium (Krasnodar) =

Stadium in Tomsk, Russia

Coordinates: 45°00′51″N 38°57′18″E

- Interactive map of Trud Stadium
- Location: Krasnodar, Russia
- Capacity: 3,000
- Surface: Grass
- Field size: 104 x 69

Construction
- Built: 1958

Tenant
- RC Kuban

Trud Stadium is a multi-purpose stadium in Krasnodar. It was the home ground of resurrected FC Kuban Krasnodar and Kubanochka Krasnodar. Now is the home arena of RC Kuban, with a capacity of 3,000 people. It was built in 1958.

== History ==
Since 2007, Trud Stadium is the home ground of RC Kuban.

On 5 August 2018, resurrected by fans and former FC Kuban footballers team played here its first official match in the Krasnodar Krai Regional League.
