= Siberian Federal University =

University in Russia

Siberian Federal University (SibFU)
- Сибирский Федеральный Университет
- Motto: Manage Your Future
- Type: Federal university
- Established: 2006
- President: Aleksandr Uss
- Rector: Maksim V. Rumyantsev
- Academic staff: 3000
- Students: 41000
- Location: Russian Federation, 660041 Krasnoyarsk,79 Svobodny Prospect, Krasnoyarsk, Russia; 56°00′15″N 92°46′21″E
- Campus: City type, 650 hectares
- Colours: Silver and Orange
- Website: www.sfu.ru (engl.) Building details
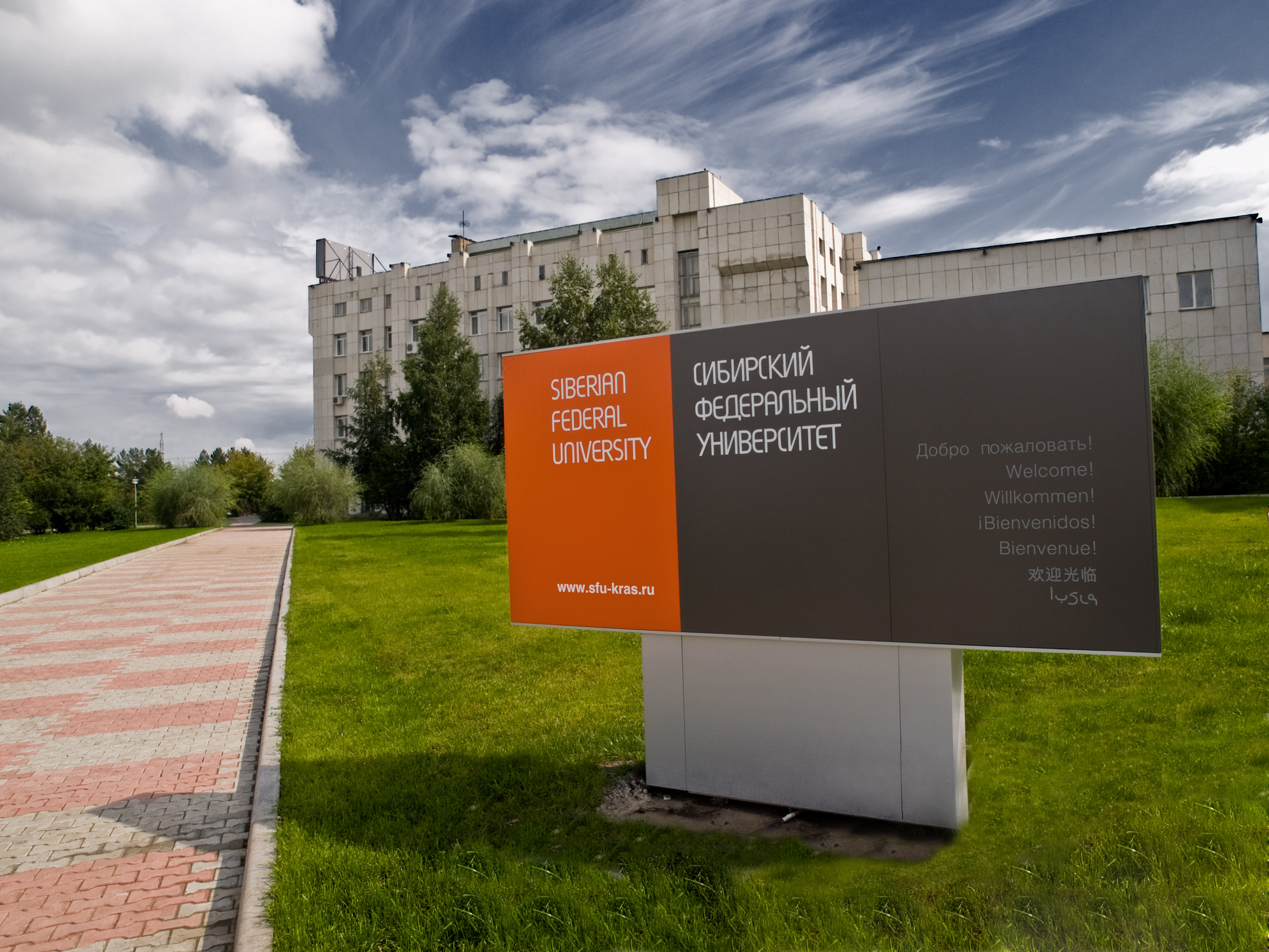

University rankings

Global – Overall
- USNWR Global: 1,589 (2023)

Regional – Overall
- QS Emerging Europe and Central Asia: 109 (2022)

Siberian Federal University (Russian: Сибирский федеральный университет, Sibirskiĭ federalʹnyĭ universitet, often shortened to SibFU, СФУ) is a multidisciplinary university located in Krasnoyarsk in Siberia, that combines fundamental and applied research and teaching. The Siberian Federal University was ranked # 1,589 in the world in 2023 by US News & World Report.

The university was established in 2006 by merging four universities of Krasnoyarsk city that had been training professionals in the most competitive sectors of economy in Siberia and the Far East Russia: Krasnoyarsk State University, Krasnoyarsk State Technical University, Krasnoyarsk State Academy of Architecture and Construction and Krasnoyarsk State University of Non-Ferrous Metals and Gold. SibFU is a higher educational institution and consists of 19 institutes with more than 3,000 faculty staff teaching 41,000 students.

The universities' fundamental and applied research is closely connected with Institutions of the Siberian Division of the Russian Academy of Sciences; many scientists from these institutions are professors and lecturers in the SibFU. It has its own university press, which includes the Scientific Journal of the Siberian Federal University. The chairman of the university's board of trustees is Dmitry A. Medvedev, Deputy Chairman of the Security Council and the former President and Prime Minister of the Russian Federation.

SibFU participates in the international collaboration and integration into international research and education space.

== History ==
The Federal State Autonomous Educational Institution of Higher Education “Siberian Federal University” was established within the framework of the “Education” National Project by the Resolution of the Russian Government No.1518-р issued on November 4, 2006. The purposes of the new University establishment were to support modernization of the Russian higher education system, to increase the competitiveness of Siberian economy, to train professionals, and to develop international cooperation in research, education, technology and culture.

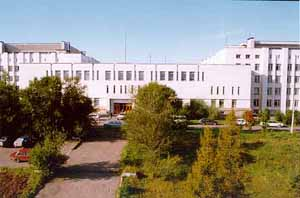
Main building of SibFU

SibFU was established by merging four Universities: Krasnoyarsk State University, Krasnoyarsk State Technical University, Krasnoyarsk State Academy of Architecture and Construction, and Krasnoyarsk State University of Non-Ferrous Metals and Gold. SibFU is a multidisciplinary institution that combines fundamental and applied research and teaching.

Partnership relations are formed with universities of Russia, Europe, Asia and the USA (SibFU Department of International Affairs).

Siberian Federal University includes 35 R&D subdivisions such as research institutes, design bureau, centers for equipment joint use, REC, laboratories, innovation centers, technology parks, centers of technology transfer, pilot factories, etc.

== Rankings ==
The Siberian Federal University was ranked # 1,589 in the world in 2023 by US News & World Report. It was ranked #14 among Russian universities in the rankings "Web of Science" (composed by Thomas Reuters) and "Ranking Web of World Universities". The university holds positions in Russian universities' rankings: 9th place (AA+) in the ARES-2020 Russian Universities Ranking; 12th — 14th place in the Total National Rating of Universities (rating is composed by Interfax and Echo of Moscow); 7th — 8th place in the section "Innovations and Entrepreneurship", 6th — 10th place in the section "Education". It was also awarded 4 stars in 2014 QS University Rating.

== Structure ==
The organization structure of Siberian Federal University consists of following Institutes:

- Institute for the Humanities
- Institute of Engineering and Construction
- Institute of Architecture and Design
- Institute of Mining, Geology and Geotechnology
- Institute of Engineering Physics and Radio Electronics
- Institute of Space and Information Technology
- Institute of Mathematics and Computer Science
- Institute of Core Undergraduate Programmes
- Institute of Petroleum and Natural Gas Engineering
- Institute of Education, Psychology and Sociology
- Institute of Business Management and Economics
- Institute of Philology and Language Communication
- Institute of Fundamental Biology and Biotechnology
- Institute of Economics, Management and Environmental Studies
- Institute of Non-Ferrous Metals and Materials Science
- Polytechnic Institute
- Law Institute
- Institute of Military Training
- Institute of Physical Education, Sport and Tourism

== Endowment ==
Siberian Federal University has the Endowment Organization which is devoted to formation and beneficial use of specific capital. The main objectives of the Endowment are:

- Modernization of material and technical base of Siberian Federal University;
- Financing of capital investment projects, academic, research and development activities of the faculty and students of Siberian Federal University;
- Assistance to SibFU human resources development.

Siberian Federal University is funded by the Administration of Krasnoyarsk Krai, chief executives of the Administration of Krasnoyarsk Krai make materials contributions to the Endowment of SibFU development.

== Campus development ==
Siberian Federal University appears to have a special place in the development programmes of Krasnoyarsk agglomeration. Its intellectual center must have an appropriate infrastructure, so the construction of a university campus has been initially planned. The university campus will occupy an area of 650 hectares, with 22 new building projects in its territory.

With the financial support of regional authorities two academic university buildings have been completed. The Institute of Space and Information Technology, the Institute for the Humanities, the Institute of Philology and Language Communication and the Institute of Urban Construction, Management and Regional Economics are located in these buildings. The building of digital library and university administration has been put into service. In August 2009, a new dormitory for 700 students with a modern layout has been brought into operation. By the decision of the student union committee the freshmen became the first tenants of the dormitory. The documentation for the construction of several dormitories and new academic buildings has been already prepared on the federal authorities instructions. An essential part of the campus will be a technopark that will combine research capacities of the university and institutes of the Siberian Division of the Russian Academy of Sciences, SibFU staff and resources of the largest high-tech corporations.

== International collaboration ==
In Siberian Federal University much attention is devoted to development of international collaboration and integration into international research and educational space. The university has close contacts with institutes and universities in countries such as: Great Britain, Germany, Spain, France, the Czech Republic, Slovenia, Italy, Japan, the United States, the People's Republic of China, Vietnam, Uzbekistan, Turkey, Singapore, Mongolia and the Republic of Korea. All this activities allow future development of the international research activities, academic exchanges of students, teachers and researchers.

Several academic and research subdivisions have been established and function jointly at the university:

- regional research center of geodynamical service in cooperation with Potsdam Georesearch Centre (Germany) and La Societe Collecte Localisation Satellites (GLS-France);
- research and educational Russian-German Centre and the international “East-West information center” in cooperation with the “East-West science center” at Kassel University;
- UNESCO Department of "New Materials and Technology” for the training of elite specialists: masters, postgraduate and doctoral students.

The university has the Center for International Education which provides training courses and the state examination of Russian as a foreign language. In addition, the center helps foreign citizens and stateless persons study Russian as a foreign language for the purpose of entering SibFU. At present, over 200 international students are studying at Siberian Federal University; foreign professors from China, Japan, Turkey and Italy are working at SibFU.

The university is a member of the University of the Arctic. UArctic is an international cooperative network based in the Circumpolar Arctic region, consisting of more than 200 universities, colleges, and other organizations with an interest in promoting education and research in the Arctic region. The collaboration has been paused after the beginning of the Russo-Ukrainian War in 2022.

== Sports ==
Much attention is devoted to the student sports achievements as an effective way of promoting SibFU in Russia and abroad. SibFU is proud of achievements of the university's students and staff:

- Olga Medvedtseva, Honoured Master of Sports, two-times Olympic champion and six-times world champion in biathlon;
- Nazyr Mankiev, Honoured Master of Sports, Beijing Olympic Champion, winner of Greco-Roman wrestling world cup;
- Svetlana Boldykova, Master of Sports of International Level in snowboarding, silver champion of world cups, silver champion of the Universiade;

SibFU students publish the university newspaper and work on SibFU TV channel, which provides with news reports not only own broadcasting network, but also Krasnoyarsk region TV channel's programmes.

The material base of Siberian Federal University for sport activities consists of 5 sport centers which have 17 gyms, 2 swimming pools, 3 rock exercise facilities.

== Journal ==
The SibFU Journal was set up pursuant to the decision made by the academic council on the 23d of April 2007 in order to contribute to the program of the SibFU development and provide international priorities for scientific works of the faculty and staff, PG students and PhD students. The «SibFU Journal» is a quarterly peer-reviewed academic journal («Humanities and Social Sciences», «Mathematics and Physics», «Biology», «Chemistry», «Engineering and Technologies»). Articles in the Journal are available in both Russian and English.

== Student self-administration ==
There are two organizations which represent student self-administration: the Primary Trade Union Student Organization and the SibFU Students Union. The Primary Trade Union Student Organization is a student community which comprises more than 20000 members. The SibFU Students Union has just been established.

== Traditional events ==
Traditional events of Siberian Federal University are:

- Theatrical days;
- «Proshu slova», a competition-show for the first-year students;
- «New Spring» Festival

“Universinale” or so-called “Days of Siberian Federal University” is one of the first and major traditions of the university. The first of September is one of the first events which has become the tradition of Siberian Federal University. It's a celebration of the first-year students of Siberian Federal University.

== Figures and facts ==
- more than 60 collaboration agreements with Russian and foreign universities and research centers
- more than 200 foreign students study at the university annually;
- more than 1,000 students who are future military experts in the fields of communication, translation and economy are trained at the university's military department and military center;
- International students from 14 countries are studying at the university.
