= Soviet Championship (rugby union) =

The Soviet Championship was a rugby union club competition between the domestic teams of the Soviet Union era. It was first contested in 1936, and was last held in 1990.

== History ==
Historically rugby union had been banned in the Russian Empire due to Tsarist authorities thinking it liable to cause a riot. When the Soviet Union was established, rugby was encouraged within Soviet educational institutions. The growth led to the creation of the Rugby Federation of the USSR in 1936 with the Soviet Championship being established in the same year. Despite interruption as a result of the Second World War, the Soviet Championship resumed until 1949 when the Soviet Union politburo ruled that rugby was: "a game not relevant to the principles of the Soviet people" and banned it. It was unbanned in 1957 with a game between the Welsh club Llanelli RFC and Romanian club Grivita Rosa. The Soviet Championship resumed in 1966 following an increase in sports participation following Joseph Stalin's death.

In the 1970s, 20 teams were playing in the Soviet Championship, with a growing popularity within Siberia. Originally, the Soviet Championship was dominated by teams from the Russian Soviet Socialist Republic. By the 1980s, clubs from the Georgian Soviet Socialist Republic became the stronger region in the Soviet Championship until its dissolution. Despite rugby union officially being strictly amateur, in the Soviet Championship, a number of clubs paid players professionally by giving them paper jobs with Soviet companies while playing rugby. After the collapse of the Soviet Union, four former Soviet Championship clubs went out of business due to a lack of funding as state sports sponsor money was prioritised for Olympic sports.

== Results ==
Year	Gold	Silver	Bronze
1936	(Russian Soviet Federative Socialist Republic) Dynamo Moscow	(Russian Soviet Federative Socialist Republic) VTsIK School Moscow	(Russian Soviet Federative Socialist Republic) Technical Gorky
1938	(Russian Soviet Federative Socialist Republic) Dynamo Moscow	(Russian Soviet Federative Socialist Republic) Spartak Moscow	(Russian Soviet Federative Socialist Republic) Lokomotiv Moscow
1939	(Russian Soviet Federative Socialist Republic) Dynamo Moscow	(Russian Soviet Federative Socialist Republic) Spartak Moscow	(Russian Soviet Federative Socialist Republic) Burevestnik Moscow
1966	(Russian Soviet Federative Socialist Republic) MVTU	(Georgian Soviet Socialist Republic) Dynamo Tbilisi	(Russian Soviet Federative Socialist Republic) Dynamo Moscow
1968	(Russian Soviet Federative Socialist Republic) MVTU	(Russian Soviet Federative Socialist Republic) Dynamo Moscow	(Georgian Soviet Socialist Republic) Lokomotiv Tbilisi
1969	(Russian Soviet Federative Socialist Republic) VVA	(Russian Soviet Federative Socialist Republic) Fili Moscow	(Russian Soviet Federative Socialist Republic) MAI Moscow
1970	(Russian Soviet Federative Socialist Republic) Fili Moscow	(Russian Soviet Federative Socialist Republic) MAI Moscow	(Russian Soviet Federative Socialist Republic) VVA
1971	(Russian Soviet Federative Socialist Republic) VVA	(Russian Soviet Federative Socialist Republic) MAI Moscow	(Russian Soviet Federative Socialist Republic) Burevestnik Leningrad
1972	(Russian Soviet Federative Socialist Republic) Fili Moscow	(Russian Soviet Federative Socialist Republic) VVA	(Georgian Soviet Socialist Republic) Lokomotiv Tbilisi
1973	(Russian Soviet Federative Socialist Republic) Fili Moscow	(Russian Soviet Federative Socialist Republic) Burevestnik Leningrad	(Russian Soviet Federative Socialist Republic) VVA
1974	(Russian Soviet Federative Socialist Republic) Fili Moscow	(Ukrainian Soviet Socialist Republic) KIIGA Kiev	(Russian Soviet Federative Socialist Republic) VVA
1975	(Russian Soviet Federative Socialist Republic) Fili Moscow	(Ukrainian Soviet Socialist Republic) KIIGA Kiev	(Russian Soviet Federative Socialist Republic) RC Lokomotiv Moscow
1976	(Russian Soviet Federative Socialist Republic) VVA	(Russian Soviet Federative Socialist Republic) Slava Moscow	(Ukrainian Soviet Socialist Republic) KIIGA Kiev
1977	(Russian Soviet Federative Socialist Republic) VVA	(Russian Soviet Federative Socialist Republic) Slava Moscow	(Russian Soviet Federative Socialist Republic) Fili Moscow
1978	(Ukrainian Soviet Socialist Republic) Aviator Kiev	(Russian Soviet Federative Socialist Republic) Fili Moscow	(Georgian Soviet Socialist Republic) Lokomotiv Tbilisi
1979	(Russian Soviet Federative Socialist Republic) Slava Moscow	(Russian Soviet Federative Socialist Republic) Fili Moscow	(Russian Soviet Federative Socialist Republic) VVA
1980	(Russian Soviet Federative Socialist Republic) VVA	(Russian Soviet Federative Socialist Republic) RC Lokomotiv Moscow	(Russian Soviet Federative Socialist Republic) Slava Moscow
1981	(Russian Soviet Federative Socialist Republic) VVA	(Ukrainian Soviet Socialist Republic) Aviator Kiev	(Georgian Soviet Socialist Republic) Lokomotiv Tbilisi
1982	(Russian Soviet Federative Socialist Republic) Slava Moscow	(Russian Soviet Federative Socialist Republic) VVA	(Ukrainian Soviet Socialist Republic) Aviator Kiev
1983	(Russian Soviet Federative Socialist Republic) RC Lokomotiv Moscow	(Russian Soviet Federative Socialist Republic) Fili Moscow	(Russian Soviet Federative Socialist Republic) Slava Moscow
1984	(Russian Soviet Federative Socialist Republic) VVA	(Georgian Soviet Socialist Republic) RC AIA Kutaisi	(Ukrainian Soviet Socialist Republic) Aviator Kiev
1985	(Russian Soviet Federative Socialist Republic) VVA	(Russian Soviet Federative Socialist Republic) Slava Moscow	(Georgian Soviet Socialist Republic) RC AIA Kutaisi
1986	(Russian Soviet Federative Socialist Republic) VVA	(Russian Soviet Federative Socialist Republic) Slava Moscow	(Russian Soviet Federative Socialist Republic) Fili Moscow
1987	(Georgian Soviet Socialist Republic) RC AIA Kutaisi	(Russian Soviet Federative Socialist Republic) VVA	(Ukrainian Soviet Socialist Republic) Aviator Kiev
1988	(Georgian Soviet Socialist Republic) RC AIA Kutaisi	(Russian Soviet Federative Socialist Republic) Krasny Yar	(Kazakh Soviet Socialist Republic) SKA Alma-Ata
1989	(Georgian Soviet Socialist Republic) RC AIA Kutaisi	(Russian Soviet Federative Socialist Republic) VVA	(Russian Soviet Federative Socialist Republic) Krasny Yar
1990	(Russian Soviet Federative Socialist Republic) Krasny Yar	(Russian Soviet Federative Socialist Republic) VVA	(Ukrainian Soviet Socialist Republic) Aviator Kiev
1991	(Russian Soviet Federative Socialist Republic) Krasny Yar	(Kazakh Soviet Socialist Republic) SKA Alma-Ata	(Russian Soviet Federative Socialist Republic) VVA

== Results by republic ==
Republic	Gold	Silver	Bronze	Total top 3
Russian SFSR	26	24	19	63
Georgian SSR	3	2	5	10
Ukrainian SSR	1	3	5	9
Kazakh SSR	-	1	1	2

== See also ==
- Soviet Cup
- Professional Rugby League
