= RC Kuban =

Russian rugby union club, based in Krasnodar

(Russia) RC Kuban
- Full name: RC Kuban Krasnodar
- Founded: 1996; 30 years ago
- Location: Krasnodar
- Ground: Trud Stadium (Capacity: 3000)
- Coach: Alekseenko Alexander Alexandrovich
- League: Professional Rugby League
1st kit	2nd kit

Official website
- kuban-rc.com

RC Kuban is a professional Russian rugby union team from Krasnodar. It was created in 1996, thanks to the initiative of businessman Anatoly Kiselev and Fedor Musatov. The first section was opened on the basis of a comprehensive school No.82.

== History ==
Performed in all kinds of children's and youth competitions. Krasnodar club ''South'' as early as 2004 he took part in the first Russian Championship Rugby-7. Then the bronze was won by the All-Russia competition. Two years in a row Krasnodar climbed the third step of the podium of honor Championship, taking third place.

In 2007 year he received an invitation to lead the team coach Alexander Alekseenko, behind which was a successful work at the club "VVA-Moscow".
