= Krasny Yar Krasnoyarsk =

(Russia) Krasny Yar
- Full name: Регбийный клуб "Красный Яр" Красноярск (Regbiynyy klub "Krasniy Yar" Krasnoyarsk)
- Founded: 1969
- Location: Krasnoyarsk
- Ground(s): Krasny Yar Stadium (Capacity: 3,600); Central Stadium (Capacity: 15,000)
- Coach(es): Igor Nikolaychuk
- League(s): Professional Rugby League
Team kit

Official website
- yar-rugby.ru

Krasny Yar Krasnoyarsk is a Russian rugby union club founded in 1969 in the city of Krasnoyarsk. They compete in the Professional Rugby League, the premier league in the country. They have an operating budget of 2.5m Euros. Their main rival is fellow Krasnoyarsk based, Enisey-STM.

Krasny-Yar play in white and green, and moved into their own purpose-built stadium. The stadium holds 3,600 spectators and is the first rugby-specific stadium east of the Urals. The stadium sold out for a game against VVA-Monino (2 August 2010).

== History ==
Krasny Yar was founded in 1969 in the city of Krasnoyarsk. Krasny Yar have been unsuccessful in the Professional Rugby League era. The club has not been champions since the Super League era, with their most recent championship being in 2001. The club's financial resources have also been overtaken by their local rivals, Enisey-STM.

Several New Zealand players signed on to play for Krasny Yar for the 2010 and 2011 Seasons, while the club has also recruited a New Zealand trainer working with the Canterbury Rugby Union.

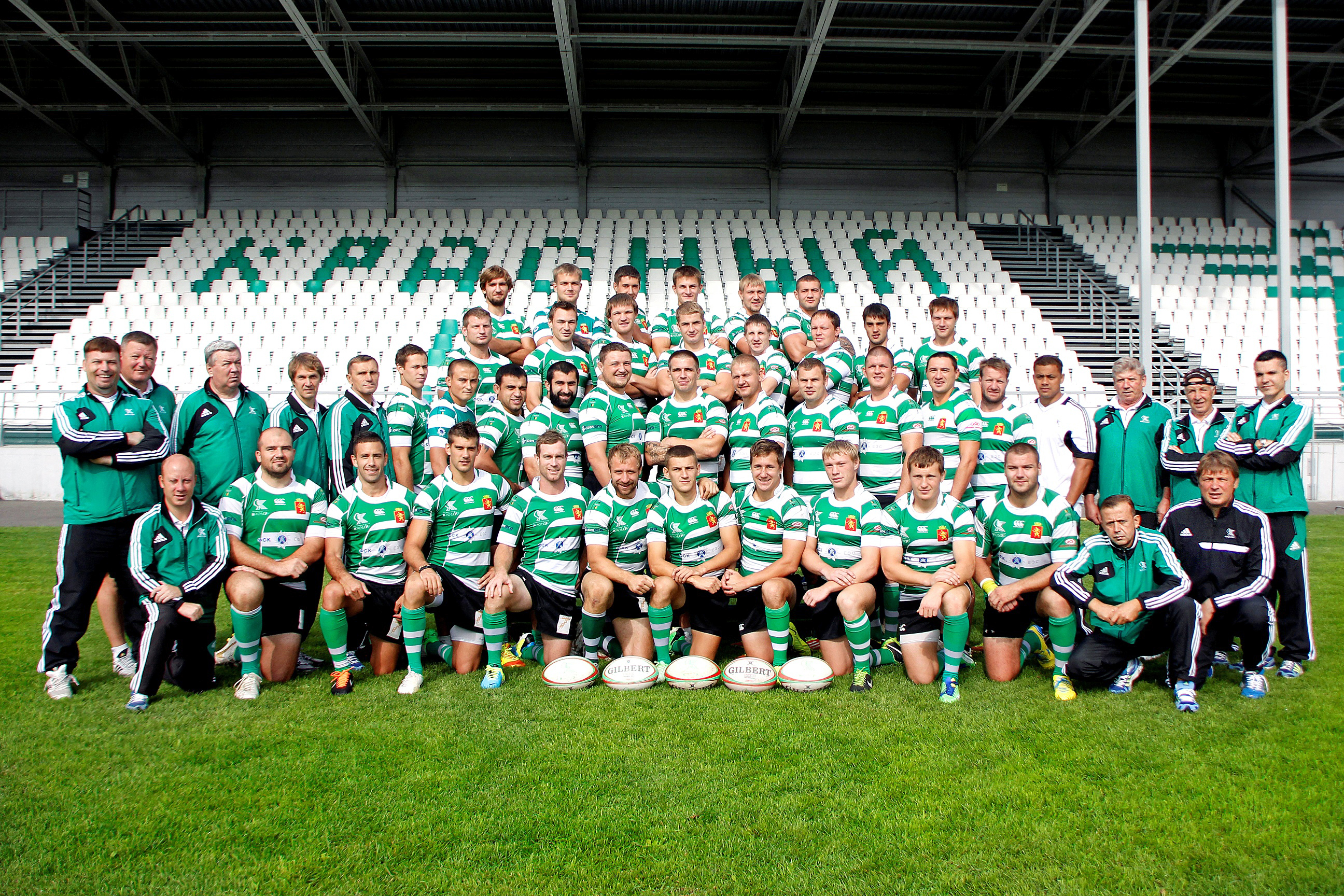
Krasny Yar in 2013

=== Honours ===
- USSR/Russian Championship (12): 1990, 1991, 1992, 1994, 1995, 1996, 1997, 1998, 2000, 2001, 2013, 2015
- Runner-up (12): 1988, 1993, 1999, 2002, 2006, 2011, 2012, 2014, 2016, 2017, 2018, 2019
- Russian Cup (10): 1995, 1996, 1998, 2003, 2006, 2011, 2013, 2015, 2018–19, 2019
- Russian Supercup (1): 2016
- Nikolaev Cup (2): 2019, 2020
- European Rugby Continental Shield runner-up (1): 2016–17

== Record in European Games ==
Opponent	Country	Competition	Played	Wins	Draws	Losses	Points For	Points Against	Points Difference
Mogliano	(Italy)	European Rugby Continental Shield	1	1	0	0	48	24	+24
El Salvador	(Spain)	European Rugby Continental Shield	1	1	0	0	32	5	+27
Heidelberger RK	(Germany)	European Rugby Continental Shield	1	1	0	0	50	21	+29
Rovigo Delta	(Italy)	European Rugby Continental Shield	1	1	0	0	42	11	+31
Timișoara Saracens	(Romania)	European Rugby Continental Shield	2	1	0	1	39	35	+4
Enisey-STM	(Russia)	European Rugby Continental Shield	3	0	0	3	56	110	-54
Stade Francais	(France)	European Rugby Challenge Cup	2	1	0	1	58	68	-10
Edinburgh Rugby	(Scotland)	European Rugby Challenge Cup	2	0	0	2	14	151	-137
London Irish	(England)	European Rugby Challenge Cup	2	0	0	2	34	71	-37

== Stadium ==
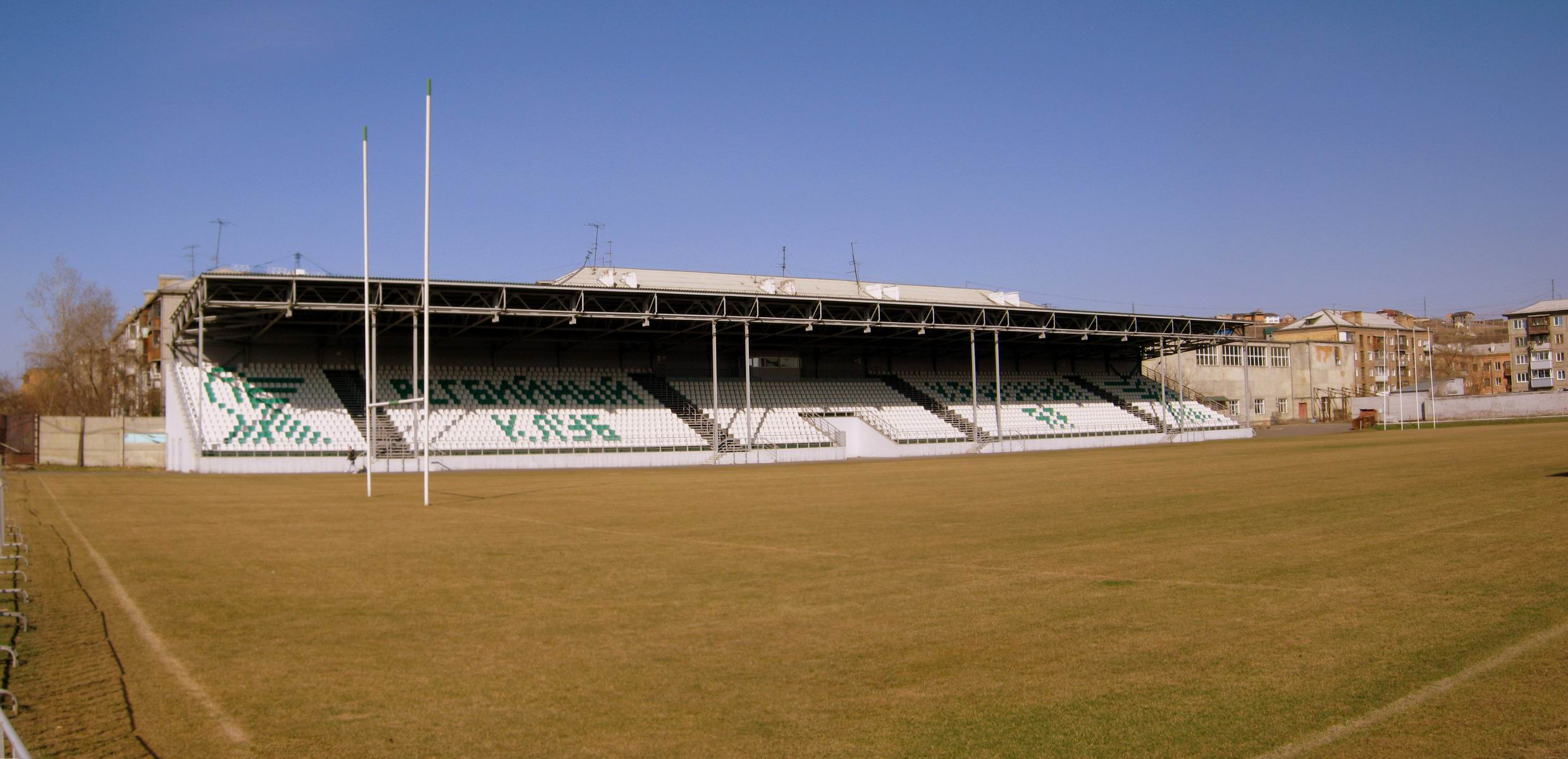
Krasny Yar Stadium

== Current squad ==
2022 Russian Rugby Championship

Krasny Yar
Pos.	Nat.	Name	Date of birth (age)	Caps	Former club
HK	(Russia)	Andrey Kondakov	16 April 1987 (age 38)		homegrown player
HK	(Georgia (country))	Robert Sutidze	21 June 1989 (age 36)		(Russia) Slava Moscow
HK	(Russia)	Dmitry Kuzero	26 June 1996 (age 29)		homegrown player
HK	(Russia)	Artyom Borzenkov	27 May 2002 (age 23)		homegrown player
PR	(Russia)	Grigory Tsnobiladze	1 February 1983 (age 42)	22	(Russia) Metallurg
PR	(Tonga)	Sione Fukofuka	13 April 1984 (age 41)	2	(Tonga) Tautahi Gold
PR	(Russia)	Evgeny Pronenko	6 June 1984 (age 41)	50	(Russia) Enisei-STM
PR	(Russia)	Aleksandr Ageev	29 January 1991 (age 34)		(Russia) Vladivostok Tigers
PR	(Russia)	Evgeny Pronin	12 April 1992 (age 33)		(Russia) Vladivostok Tigers
PR	(Russia)	Kirill Alyuk	21 March 1994 (age 31)		(Russia) RC Kuban
PR	(Russia)	Alexander Kadirov	24 January 1999 (age 26)		(Russia) Chita
LK	(Russia)	Bogdan Fedotko	22 September 1994 (age 31)	27	homegrown player
LK	(Russia)	Egor Talalenko	17 April 1998 (age 27)		(Russia) Vladivostok Tigers
LK	(Russia)	Ruslan Bazhenov	1 March 1998 (age 27)		homegrown player
LK	(Russia)	Alexander Ilyin	7 November 1997 (age 27)	13	homegrown player
LK	(Kazakhstan)	Ivan Ivanov	8 November 1999 (age 25)		(Russia) Lokomotiv Penza
FL	(Russia)	Evgeny Golshteyn	29 July 1989 (age 36)		homegrown player
FL	(Russia)	Alexander Khudyakov	29 September 1989 (age 35)	11	homegrown player
FL	(Russia)	Roman Khodin	9 June 1993 (age 32)	6	(Russia) Strela
FL	(Russia)	Danil Losenkov	31 January 2002 (age 23)		(Russia) Vladivostok Tigers
FL	(Russia)	Semyon Borzenkov	27 May 2002 (age 23)		homegrown player
N8	(Russia)	Victor Arhip	24 February 1990 (age 35)	2	(Russia) Enisei-STM
SH	(Russia)	Vasily Dorofeev	6 August 1990 (age 35)	25	homegrown player
SH	(Russia)	Denis Barabantsev	26 April 1993 (age 32)	2	(Russia) Strela
SH	(South Africa)	Cornelius Korff	30 January 1999 (age 26)		(South Africa) Free State Cheetahs
FH	(South Africa)	Dylan Smith	1 January 2001 (age 24)		(South Africa) Griffons
FH	(Tonga)	Jason Tuamalolo	22 March 2002 (age 23)		(Tonga)
CE	(Russia)	Igor Galinovskiy	8 November 1985 (age 39)	50	homegrown player
CE	(Russia)	Vladimir Rudenko	1 September 1987 (age 38)	26	homegrown player
CE	(Russia)	Evgeny Kolomiytsev	16 May 1990 (age 35)	4	homegrown player
CE	(Russia)	Kirill Gubin	30 May 1992 (age 33)	1	(Russia) RC Kuban
CE	(Georgia (country))	Giorgi Pruidze	2 June 1994 (age 31)	15	(Georgia (country)) AIA Kutaisi
WG	(Russia)	Evgeny Nepeyvoda	15 September 1989 (age 36)	3	(Russia) RC Kuban
WG	(Russia)	Vladimir Chaban	3 November 1994 (age 30)		homegrown player
WG	(Russia)	Mikhail Zinin	11 January 1995 (age 30)		(Russia) RC 80
WG	(Tonga)	Sunia Latu	23 March 1996 (age 29)
WG	(Russia)	Alexander Regner	25 May 1998 (age 27)		homegrown player
WG	(Russia)	Konstantin Krivonosov	17 December 1998 (age 26)		homegrown player
WG	(Russia)	Denis Tsurupa	12 September 1999 (age 26)		homegrown player
FB	(Russia)	Khushnud Sanginov	15 August 2000 (age 25)		homegrown player

=== Notable players ===
- (Russia) Vasily Artemyev
- (Russia) Victor Gresev
- (Russia) Valery Tsnobiladze
- (Russia) Andrey Garbuzov
- (Russia) Igor Galinovskiy
- (New Zealand) Campbell Johnstone
- (New Zealand) Marty Banks
- (New Zealand) Glen Horton
- (New Zealand) Craig Clare
- (New Zealand) Toby Morland
- (New Zealand) Pehi Te Whare
- (New Zealand) Scott Cowan
- (Scotland) Nick McLennan
- (Georgia (country)) Lasha Malaghuradze
- (Georgia (country)) Soso Matiashvili
- (Georgia (country)) Lasha Lomidze
- (Georgia (country)) Giorgi Pruidze
- (Georgia (country)) Jaba Bregvadze
- (Lithuania) Karolis Navickas
- (Tonga) Eddie Paea
- (Tonga) Fangatapu Apikotoa
