= Russian Rugby Championship =

Rugby championship

Pari - Russian Rugby Championship
- Formerly: Soviet Rugby Championship; Russian Superleague; Rugby Premier League
- Sport: Rugby union
- Founded: 1936; 90 years ago 1992; 34 years ago (reformed); 2004; 22 years ago (reformed)
- First season: 1936
- Owner: Russian Rugby Union
- No. of teams: 9
- Country: Russia
- Most recent champion: Enisei-STM (10th title)
- Most titles: VVA-Podmoskovye Monino (17 titles)
- Website: cps-rugby.ru

The Russian Rugby Championship, officially known as the Pari - Russian Rugby Championship for sponsorship reasons (Russian: Пари - Чемпионат России по регби), is Russia's top level professional men's rugby union competition. The Russian Rugby Championship is run by Russian Rugby Union and is contested by 10 teams as of the 2019-2020 season.

== History ==
The founding of the league coincided with a period of rapid change for Russian rugby. The first Russian rugby championship, which succeeded the Soviet Rugby Championship, was played in 1992, under the name Russian Superleague. The league kept this name until 2004, when the competition was then rebranded as the Rugby Premier League.

In 2007, Yug-Krasnodar were admitted to the competition, increasing the number of teams in the league to eight.

Just one year later, in 2008, a further six teams from several of the lower division competitions were admitted into the Rugby Premier League. This increased the total number of teams again, to fourteen teams. The fourteen teams were split into three conferences, based on geography, in that season. One thing to note was that many of the elevated clubs geographically were semi-professional or even amateur in nature, which lead to a lack of competitive balance.

2010 saw another change of format to the Rugby Premier League where the East-West divide was removed, culminating in the formation of a 'Super Group'. This meant that VVA-Podmoskovye Monino, Krasny Yar, Enisey-STM, Slava Moscow, RC Novokuznetsk and Imperia-Dynamo as well as Fili Moscow and Spartak GM were scheduled to play each other in a straight home-and-away league format.

== Current Teams ==
Locations of the 2020–21 Liga Stavok - Russian Rugby Championship

=== Current Teams ===
Note: Flags indicate national union as has been defined under WR eligibility rules. Players may hold more than one non-WR nationality

Team	Manager	Captain	Stadium	Capacity
Enisei-STM	(Russia) Aleksandr Pervukhin	(Latvia) Uldis Saulīte	Avangard Stadium; Central Stadium	2,463; 15,000
Krasny Yar	(Russia) Igor Nikolaychuk	(Moldova) Victor Arkhip	Krasny Yar Stadium; Central Stadium	3,600; 15,000
Slava	(Georgia (country)) Levan Tsabadze	(Russia) Denis Antonov	Slava Stadium	1,300
VVA	(Russia) Nikolay Nerush	(Russia) German Davydov	Gagarin Air Force Academy Stadium	1,500
Metallurg	(Russia) Vyacheslav Shalunov	(Russia) Anton Sychev	Metallurg Stadium	10,000
Lokomotiv	(Russia) Aleksandr Yanyushkin	(Russia) Sergey Yanyushkin	Pervomaysky Stadium	5,182
Strela	(South Africa) JP Nel	(Russia) Magomed Davudov	Tulpar Stadium; Central Stadium	3,275; 25,400
Dinamo	(South Africa) Rianne van Straten	(Russia) Aleksandr Zorin	Slava Stadium	1,300
Khimik	(Australia) John Molvihill		Khimik Stadium	5,266

== Champions ==
Team	Number of Titles
VVA	17
Krasny Yar	12
Enisei-STM	12
Fili Moscow	5
Dynamo Moscow	3
RC AIA Kutaisi	3
MVTU	2
Slava Moscow	2
RC Aviator Kiev	1
RC Lokomotiv Moscow	1
Lokomotiv Penza	1

== Winners by year ==
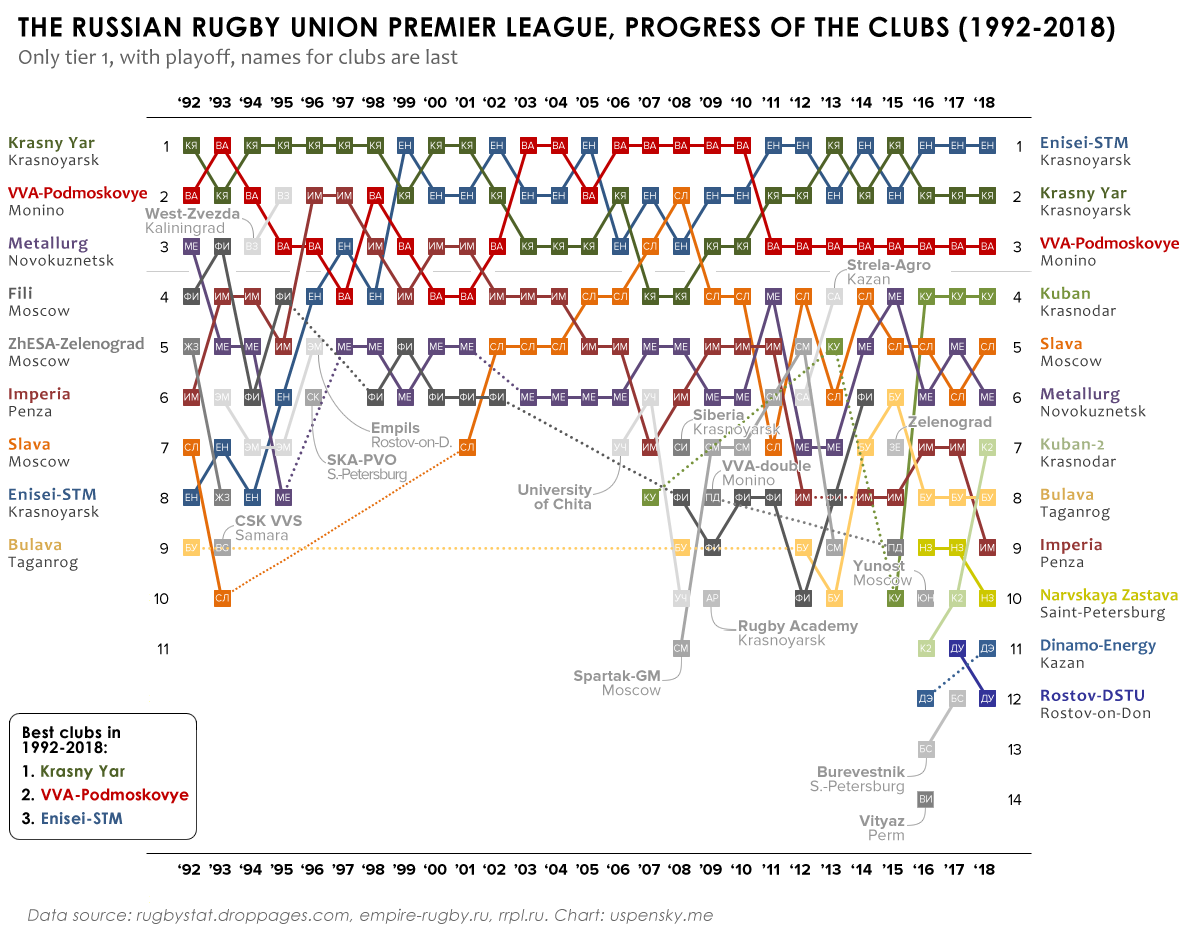
Progress of clubs in the Russian Rugby Championship (1992-2018)

Year	Champion	Runner-up
Soviet Championship
1936	Dynamo Moscow	VTsIK School Moscow
1937 Season Not Played
1938	Dynamo Moscow	Spartak Moscow
1939	Dynamo Moscow	Spartak Moscow
1940-1965 Seasons Not Played
1966	MVTU	Dynamo Tbilisi
1968	MVTU	Dynamo Moscow
1969	VVA	Fili Moscow
1970	Fili Moscow	MAI Moscow
1971	VVA	MAI Moscow
1972	Fili Moscow	VVA
1973	Fili Moscow	Burevestnik Leningrad
1974	Fili Moscow	KIIGA Kiev
1975	Fili Moscow	KIIGA Kiev
1976	VVA	Slava Moscow
1977	VVA	Slava Moscow
1978	RC Aviator Kiev	Fili Moscow
1979	Slava Moscow	Fili Moscow
1980	VVA	RC Lokomotiv Moscow
1981	VVA	RC Aviator Kiev
1982	Slava Moscow	VVA
1983	RC Lokomotiv Moscow	Fili Moscow
1984	VVA	RC AIA Kutaisi
1985	VVA	Slava Moscow
1986	VVA	Slava Moscow
1987	RC AIA Kutaisi	VVA
1988	RC AIA Kutaisi	Krasny Yar
1989	RC AIA Kutaisi	VVA
1990	Krasny Yar	VVA
1991	Krasny Yar	SKA Alma Ata
Russian Superleague
1992	Krasny Yar	VVA
1993	VVA	Krasny Yar
1994	Krasny Yar	VVA
1995	Krasny Yar	West Star Kaliningrad
1996	Krasny Yar	RC Penza
1997	Krasny Yar	RC Penza
1998	Krasny Yar	VVA
1999	Enisei-STM	Krasny Yar
2000	Krasny Yar	Enisei-STM
2001	Krasny Yar	Enisei-STM
2002	Enisei-STM	Krasny Yar
2003	VVA	Enisei-STM
2004	VVA	Enisei-STM
Russian Professional Rugby League
2005	Enisei-STM	VVA
2006	VVA	Krasny Yar
2007	VVA	Enisei-STM
2008	VVA	Slava Moscow
2009	VVA	Enisei-STM
2010	VVA	Enisei-STM
2011	Enisei-STM	Krasny Yar
2012	Enisei-STM	Krasny Yar
2013	Krasny Yar	Enisei-STM
2014	Enisei-STM	Krasny Yar
2015	Krasny Yar	Enisei-STM
2016	Enisei-STM	Krasny Yar
2017	Enisei-STM	Krasny Yar
2018	Enisei-STM	Krasny Yar
2019	Enisei-STM	Krasny Yar
2020-21	Enisei-STM	Lokomotiv
2021-22	Enisei-STM	Lokomotiv
2022-23	Lokomotiv	Enisei-STM
2023-24	Enisei-STM	Strela
2025	Strela	Dynamo Moscow

== See also ==
- Rugby union in Russia
