= Spartak GM Moscow =

(Russia) Spartak Moscow
- Full name: Spartak GM Moscow
- Location: Moscow, Russia
- Ground: Spartak Stadium
- President: (Georgia (country)) Mamuka Losaberidze
- Coach: (Georgia (country)) Douglas Kavtelashvili
- League: Professional Rugby League

Official website
- www.spartakgm.ru

Spartak GM is a Russian rugby union club from Moscow. They have been accepted into the newly unified eight team Professional Rugby League for the 2010 season. It is a section of the famous Spartak Moscow sporting organisation. They play in white and red.

== History ==
Founded in 1936, the club is based in Moscow. The club twice achieved the silver medal in the Russian rugby championship, in 1938 and 1939. The club was reborn in 1960 as part of the Russian rugby renaissance, and regularly participated in the Russian rugby championships. The team folded in 1990, but was reformed in the 21st century.

== Championships ==
=== International honours ===
- (Russia) Roman Borisov
