= Slava Moscow =

(Russia) Slava Moscow
- Full name: Slava Rugby Club
- Founded: 1974; 51 years ago
- Location: Moscow, Russia
- Ground: Slava Stadium (Capacity: 1,300)
- Coach: Levan Tsabadze
- League: Professional Rugby League

Official website
- rugby-slava.ru

Slava Moscow is a Russian rugby union club from Moscow. They participate in the Professional Rugby League, the premier rugby competition of Russia. They play in yellow and red.

== Honours ==
- USSR/Russian Championship (2): 1979, 1982
- Runner-up (5): 1976, 1977, 1985, 1986, 2008
- Soviet Cup (3): 1981, 1985, 1989

== Club staff ==
Head coach – Levan Tsabadze (Georgia (country))

Forwards coach – Sergey Popov (Russia)

== Current squad ==
2021

Slava
Pos.	Nat.	Name	Date of birth (age)	Caps	Former club
HK	(Russia)	Nazir Gasanov	20 June 1985 (age 40)	19	(Russia) Bulava Taganrog
HK	(Russia)	Sergey Chernyshev	13 May 1988 (age 37)	12	homegrown player
PR	(Russia)	Andrey Igretsov	23 December 1985 (age 39)	25	homegrown player
PR	(Russia)	Alexey Skobiola	8 August 1991 (age 34)		homegrown player
PR	(Georgia (country))	Nika Chumashvili	30 September 1996 (age 29)		(Georgia (country)) Kharebi
PR	(Russia)	Evgeny Mishechkin	27 June 1997 (age 28)	19	(Russia) Yuzhnoe Tushino
PR	(Russia)	Tamerlan Khubaev	25 April 1998 (age 27)		(Russia) MAI
PR	(Russia)	Sergey Perekhoda	22 April 1999 (age 26)		homegrown player
LK	(Russia)	Denis Antonov	17 October 1986 (age 38)	28	homegrown player
LK	(Russia)	Nikita Medkov	17 November 1986 (age 38)	7	homegrown player
LK	(Russia)	Ilya Osminko	18 January 1988 (age 37)	3	(Russia) Bulava Taganrog
LK	(South Africa)	Wynand Grassmann	9 January 1995 (age 30)		(South Africa) SWD Eagles
FL	(South Africa)	Jono Janse van Rensburg	27 February 1989 (age 36)		(South Africa) Griquas
FL	(Russia)	Nikolai Pochechuev	22 June 1991 (age 34)		(Russia) Yuzhnoe Tushino
FL	(Russia)	Grigol Tsirekidze	29 June 1990 (age 35)
FL	(Russia)	Artem Rybulin	30 August 1995 (age 30)		homegrown player
FL	(South Africa)	Michael Amiras	22 November 1999 (age 25)		(South Africa) Blue Bulls
N8	(Russia)	Mikhail Sidorov	19 November 1986 (age 38)	6	(Russia) Fili
N8	(Russia)	Nikita Vavilin	13 May 1994 (age 31)	19	(Russia) Fili
SH	(Russia)	Stepan Khokhlov	9 May 1998 (age 27)		homegrown player
SH	(Georgia (country))	Sandro Nakhutsrishvili	7 June 1998 (age 27)		(Russia) VVA
FH	(South Africa)	Gerhard Nortier	4 March 1989 (age 36)		(South Africa) SWD Eagles
FH	(Russia)	Nikita Nikushchenko	8 May 1997 (age 28)		homegrown player
FH	(New Zealand)	Rewita Biddle	20 July 1998 (age 27)		(Russia) VVA
CE	(Russia)	Evgeny Markov	10 March 1986 (age 39)		(Russia) Bulava Taganrog
CE	(Russia)	Ivan Ustinov	13 February 1990 (age 35)		homegrown player
CE	(Russia)	Sergey Stepanov	17 January 1991 (age 34)		(Russia) Yuzhnoe Tushino
CE	(Russia)	Pavel Kirillov	9 May 1993 (age 32)		homegrown player
CE	(Russia)	Igor Fyodorov	13 June 1997 (age 28)		(Russia) MAI
CE	(Russia)	Nikolay Baleskov	18 July 1997 (age 28)		(Russia) Yuzhnoe Tushino
WG	(Russia)	Omari Grinyaev	17 July 1994 (age 31)		homegrown player
WG	(Russia)	Alexander Afanasyev	23 March 1995 (age 30)		(Russia) Zelenograd
WG	(Russia)	Boris Kontselidze	22 January 2001 (age 24)		homegrown player
FB	(Georgia (country))	Irakli Svanidze	2 July 1996 (age 29)	2	(Russia) Krasny Yar
