= Fili Moscow =

(Russia) Fili Moscow
- Full name: Регбийный клуб «Фили» (Regbiyniy klub "Fili")
- Founded: 1967
- Location: Moscow, Russia
- Ground(s): Fili Stadium (Capacity: 1,000)
- League(s): Federal League (I Moscow division)

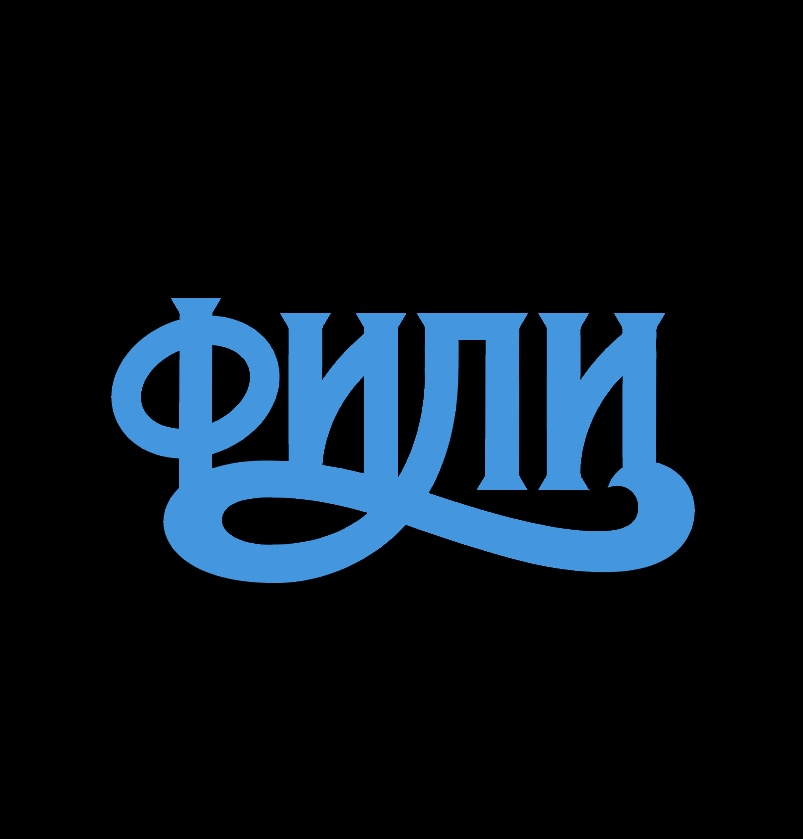
Logo of Fili club

Fili Moscow is a Russian rugby union club based in the western part of Moscow. Fili Moscow are sponsored by the Khrunichev Space Centre, builders of the International Space Station. Fili have in modern times found it hard to emulate their achievements during the 1970s, when they won the Soviet title five times. Fili beat off competition from Zelenograd for the final RPRL place for 2010 and will, like the other new entrant Spartak Moscow, count avoiding cricket scores against some of the more established teams as a success. They play in light-blue and white.

== History ==
Fili Moscow was established in 1967, making them one of the older rugby clubs in Moscow.

== Championships ==
- Soviet Champions: 1970, 1972, 1973, 1974, 1975.
- Soviet Runners-Up: 1969, 1978, 1979, 1983
