= RC Novokuznetsk =

Russian rugby union club, based in Novokuznetsk

(Russia) Metallurg
- Full name: Metallurg Rugby Club
- Founded: 1967; 59 years ago
- Location: Novokuznetsk, Russia
- Ground: Rugby Stadium (Capacity: 2000)
- Coach: Vladimir Negodin
- League: Professional Rugby League

Official website
- metallurg-rugby.ru

Metallurg is a Russian rugby union club from Kemerovo Oblast. They participate in the Professional Rugby League, the top division of Russian rugby union.
