= 2015 Rugby World Cup – repechage qualification =

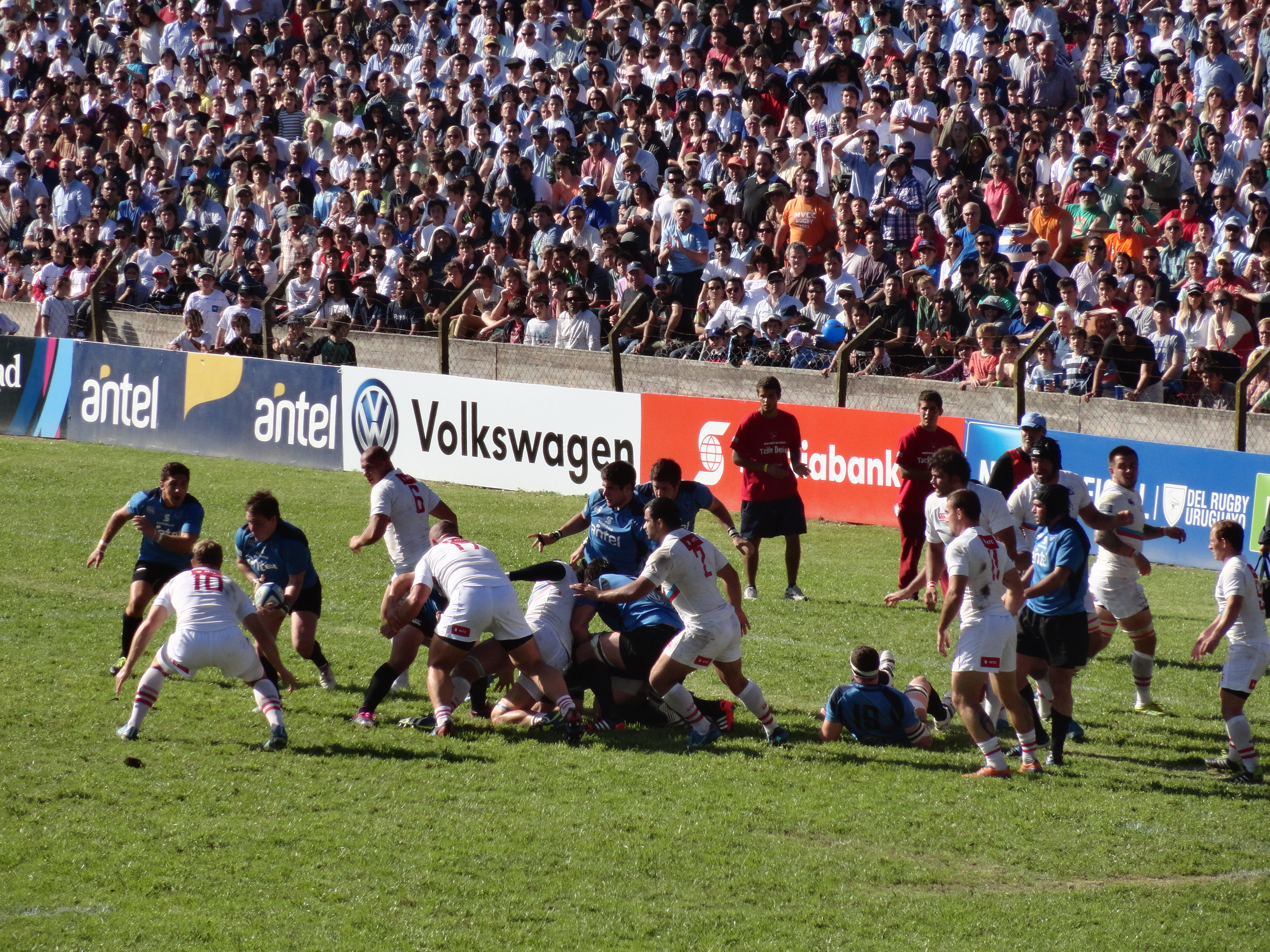
Uruguay vs Russia

For the 2015 Rugby World Cup qualifying, there were three inter-confederation play-offs to determine the final qualification spot to the 2015 Rugby World Cup. The process ended with the 20th and final team to qualify for the World Cup. Four teams, the best non-qualifier from each region except Oceania, competed for the last place at the Rugby World Cup finals in England. Uruguay won the final play, thus becoming the 20th qualifier for the World Cup and joined hosts England, Australia, Wales and Fiji in Pool A.

== Format ==
The play-off was contested on a knockout basis, with one-game semi-finals and a two-legged home and away final. One semi-final featured the third place team from European qualification and the second place team from African qualification. The other saw the third placed team from the Americas qualification and the second place team from the Asia qualification.

The host of each semi-final was the team with the higher IRB Ranking at the moment it became known who the two teams were.

== Teams ==
Confederation	Placement	Team
Africa	Round Three runner-up	Zimbabwe (27)
Americas	Round Three third	Uruguay (19)
Asia	Round Three runner-up	Hong Kong (23)
Europe	Round Six winner	Russia (20)

== Matches ==
=== Preliminary round ===
The first match was contested between Russia and Zimbabwe, and the second match between Uruguay and Hong Kong. Upon completion of African qualifying on July 6, Russia outranked Zimbabwe 20th to 27th and thus earned the right to host. Likewise, upon completion of Asian qualifying on May 25, Uruguay outranked Hong Kong 20th to 23rd to earn the right to host.

2 August 2014
19:00 KRAT (UTC+08)

Russia	23–15	Zimbabwe
Try: Klyuchnikov 7' m Simplikevich 24' m Gresev 51' c Con: Kushnarev (1/3) 52'; Pen: Kushnarev (2/3) 2', 73'	Stats	Try: Groenewald 27' c Chitokwindo 78' m Con: Cronjé (1/2) 28'; Pen: Cronjé (1/3) 48'

Central Stadium, Krasnoyarsk
Attendance: 6,500
Referee: Nigel Owens (Wales)

Team details

FB	15	Igor Klyuchnikov
RW	14	Mikhail Babaev
OC	13	Vasily Artemyev
IC	12	Alexei Makovetskiy
LW	11	Denis Simplikevich		(substituted off) 76'
FH	10	Yuri Kushnarev
SH	9	Alexander Yanyushkin		44' to 50'
N8	8	Viktor Gresev		(substituted off) 59'	(substituted in) 65'
OF	7	Andrei Temnov
BF	6	Andrei Garbuzov		(substituted off) 76'
RL	5	Andrei Ostrikov		(substituted off) 44'
LL	4	Alexander Voytov (c)
TP	3	Andrei Igretsov	(yellow card) 55'		(substituted off) 65'
HK	2	Valery Tsnobiladze		(substituted off) 76'
LP	1	Grigory Tsnobiladze
Replacements:
HK	16	Stanislav Selskiy		(substituted in) 76'
PR	17	Innokenty Zykov		(substituted in) 59'
LK	18	Artem Fatakhov		(substituted in) 44'
FL	19	Pavel Butenko		(substituted in) 76'
CE	20	Igor Galinovskiy		(substituted in) 76'
SH	21	Alexey Shcherban		(substituted in) 44'	(substituted off) 50'
FH	22	Ramil Gaisin
Coach:
(France) Raphaël Saint-André

FB	15	Danny Robertson
RW	14	Tafadzwa Chitokwindo
OC	13	Riann O'Neill
IC	12	Daniel Hondo (c)
LW	11	Shayne Makombe
FH	10	Guy Cronje	50' to 64'
SH	9	Hilton Mudariki	(substituted off) 65'
N8	8	Lambert Groenewald
OF	7	Jacques Leitao
BF	6	Graeme Lawler	(substituted off) 59'
RL	5	Sanele Sibanda	(substituted off) 74'
LL	4	Jan Ferreira	(substituted off) 40'
TP	3	Kevin Nqindi	(substituted off) 65'
HK	2	Keith Murray	(substituted off) 65'
LP	1	Pieter Joubert
Replacements:
HK	16	Matthew Mandioma	(substituted in) 65'
PR	17	Lawrence Cleminson	(substituted in) 65'
FL	18	Takunda Chifokoyo	(substituted in) 59'
FL	19	Fortunate Chipendu	(substituted in) 40'
N8	20	Kingsley Lang	(substituted in) 74'
SH	21	Peter du Toit	(substituted in) 65'
FH	22	Lenience Tambwera	(substituted in) 50'	(substituted off) 64'
Coach:
(Zimbabwe) Brendon Dawson

Touch judges:
Sean Brickell (Wales)
Wayne Davies (Wales)

2 August 2014
15:45 UYT (UTC-03)

Uruguay	28–3	Hong Kong
Try: Berchesi 69' m Magno 80' m Pen: Ormaechea (5/8) 3', 28', 57', 67', 74'; Berchesi (1/1) 43'	Stats	Pen: McAdam (1/1) 13'

Estadio Charrúa, Montevideo
Attendance: 5,000
Referee: Federico Anselmi (Argentina)

Team details

FB	15	Gastón Mieres
RW	14	Santiago Gibernau	(substituted off) 69'
OC	13	Joaquín Prada
IC	12	Alberto Román
LW	11	Jerónimo Etcheverry
FH	10	Felipe Berchesi
SH	9	Agustín Ormaechea
N8	8	Alejandro Nieto	(substituted off) 77'
OF	7	Diego Magno
BF	6	Juan Manuel Gaminara	(substituted off) 67'
RL	5	Mathias Palomeque	(substituted off) 55'
LL	4	Franco Lamanna	(substituted off) 76'
TP	3	Oscar Durán	(substituted off) 61'
HK	2	Nicolás Klappenbach (c)	(substituted off) 61'
LP	1	Alejo Corral	(substituted off) 73'
Replacements:
HK	16	Arturo Avalo	(substituted in) 61'
PR	17	Carlos Arboleya	(substituted in) 61'
PR	18	Rodolfo De Mula	(substituted in) 73'
FL	19	Santiago Vilaseca	(substituted in) 55'
LK	20	Cristofer Soares De Lima	(substituted in) 76'
FL	21	Juan de Freitas	(substituted in) 67'
SH	22	Guillermo Lijtenstein	(substituted in) 69'
FH	23	Alejo Durán	(substituted in) 58'
Coach:
(Uruguay) Pablo Lemoine

FB	15	Alex McQueen
RW	14	Salom Yiu Kam Shing		(substituted off) 47'
OC	13	Lloyd Jones
IC	12	Jake Phelps
LW	11	Rowan Varty
FH	10	Chris McAdam		(substituted off) 76'
SH	9	Jaime Hood		(substituted off) 76'
N8	8	Pale Tauti		(substituted off) 61'
OF	7	Matt Lamming
BF	6	Nick Hewson (c)	(yellow card) 66'
RL	5	Jack Delaforce
LL	4	Paul Dywer		(substituted off) 67'
TP	3	James Cooper		(substituted off) 79'
HK	2	Alex Harris		(substituted off) 61'
LP	1	Leon Wei Hon Sum	(yellow card) 51'
Replacements:
HK	16	Tom Bolland		(substituted in) 61'
PR	17	Jack Bennett
PR	18	Phil Leung Chun Hon		(substituted in) 79'
FL	19	Bill Brant		(substituted in) 67'
FL	20	Alex Baddeley		(substituted in) 61'
CE	21	Niall Rowark		(substituted in) 76'
SH	22	Charles Cheung Ho Ning		(substituted in) 76'
WG	23	Tom McQueen		(substituted in) 47'
Coach:
(Scotland) Andrew Hall

Touch judges:
UAR Appt (Argentina)
UAR Appt (Argentina)
Television match official:

=== Qualification round ===
The final stage of the Repechage qualification, and Rugby World Cup qualification, was a two-legged series between Russia and Uruguay. As Uruguay were the higher ranked team upon completion of the preliminary round, they traveled to Russia for the first leg and host the second. Uruguay won the series with an aggregate score of 57–49.

Team 1	Agg.	Team 2	1st leg	2nd leg
Russia	49–57	Uruguay	22–21	27–36

==== First leg ====
27 September 2014
16:00 KRAT (UTC+08)

Russia	22–21	Uruguay
Try: G. Tsnobiladze 39' c Con: Kushnarev (1/1) 40'; Pen: Kushnarev (5/5) 2', 20', 33', 53', 66'	Stats	Pen: Berchesi (7/9) 4', 18', 26', 37', 56', 60', 63'

Central Stadium, Krasnoyarsk
Attendance: 4,000
Referee: George Clancy (Ireland)

Team details

FB	15	Vasily Artemyev
RW	14	Mikhail Babaev	(yellow card) 61'
OC	13	Dimitry Gerasimov		(substituted off) 75'
IC	12	Alexei Makovetskiy
LW	11	Vladimir Ostroushko
FH	10	Yuri Kushnarev
SH	9	Alexander Yanyushkin		(substituted off) 68'
N8	8	Viktor Gresev
OF	7	Andrei Garbuzov
BF	6	Andrei Temnov		(substituted off) 77'
RL	5	Kirill Kulemin
LL	4	Alexander Voytov (c)		(substituted off) 50'
TP	3	Evgeni Pronenko		(substituted off) 50'
HK	2	Valery Tsnobiladze		(substituted off) 72'
LP	1	Grigory Tsnobiladze
Replacements:
HK	16	Vladislav Korshunov		(substituted in) 72'
PR	17	Andrei Igretsov	(yellow card) 63'	(substituted in) 50'
FL	18	Andrei Ostrikov		(substituted in) 50'
FL	19	Pavel Butenko		(substituted in) 77'
WG	20	Denis Simplikevich		(substituted in) 75'
SH	21	Ruslan Yagudin		(substituted in) 68'
FB	22	Ramil Gaisin
Coach:
(France) Raphaël Saint-André

FB	15	Gastón Mieres
RW	14	Santiago Gibernau
OC	13	Joaquín Prada
IC	12	Alberto Román
LW	11	Jerónimo Etcheverry	(substituted off) 75'
FH	10	Felipe Berchesi
SH	9	Agustín Ormaechea
N8	8	Alejandro Nieto
OF	7	Diego Magno	(substituted off) 75'
BF	6	Juan Manuel Gaminara
RL	5	Rodrigo Capó Ortega
LL	4	Santiago Vilaseca	(substituted off) 62'
TP	3	Oscar Durán	(substituted off) 53'
HK	2	Nicolás Klappenbach (c)	(substituted off) 77'
LP	1	Alejo Corral
Replacements:
HK	16	Arturo Ávalo	(substituted in) 77'
PR	17	Carlos Arboleya	(substituted in) 53'
LK	18	Franco Lamanna	(substituted in) 78'
LK	19	Mathias Palomeque	(substituted in) 62'
FL	20	Juan de Freitas	(substituted in) 75'
WG	21	Leandro Leivas
SH	22	Alejo Durán
Coach:
(Uruguay) Pablo Lemoine

Touch judges:
David Wilkinson (Ireland)
Olly Hodges (Ireland)
Television match official:
Simon McDowell (Ireland)

==== Second leg ====
11 October 2014
15:45 UYT (UTC-03)

Uruguay	36–27	Russia
Try: Prada 45' c Corral 54' c Ormaechea 63' c Con: Berchesi (3/3) 46', 55', 64'; Pen: Berchesi (5/6) 14', 19', 32', 34', 77'	Stats	Try: Yanyushkin 38' m Artemyev 72' c Con: Kushnarev (1/2) 73'; Pen: Kushnarev (5/6) 10', 21', 24', 36', 45'

Estadio Charrúa, Montevideo
Attendance: 14,000
Referee: Romain Poite (France)

Team details

FB	15	Gastón Mieres
RW	14	Santiago Gibernau		(substituted off) 48'
OC	13	Joaquín Prada
IC	12	Alberto Román
LW	11	Jerónimo Etcheverry		(substituted off) 71'
FH	10	Felipe Berchesi
SH	9	Agustín Ormaechea
N8	8	Alejandro Nieto		(substituted off) 64'
OF	7	Diego Magno
BF	6	Juan Manuel Gaminara		(substituted off) 73'
RL	5	Rodrigo Capó Ortega
LL	4	Santiago Vilaseca		(substituted off) 45'
TP	3	Oscar Durán		(substituted off) 45'
HK	2	Nicolás Klappenbach (c)		(substituted off) 60'
LP	1	Alejo Corral
Replacements:
HK	16	Arturo Ávalo		(substituted in) 60'
PR	17	Carlos Arboleya	(yellow card) 68'	(substituted in) 45'
LK	18	Franco Lamanna		(substituted in) 64'
LK	19	Mathias Palomeque		(substituted in) 45'
FL	20	Juan de Freitas		(substituted in) 73'
WG	21	Leandro Leivas		(substituted in) 48'
SH	22	Alejo Durán		(substituted in) 71'
Coach:
(Uruguay) Pablo Lemoine

FB	15	Vasily Artemyev
RW	14	Denis Simplikevich	(yellow card) 66'
OC	13	Mikhail Babaev
IC	12	Dimitry Gerasimov
LW	11	Vladimir Ostroushko
FH	10	Yuri Kushnarev
SH	9	Alexander Yanyushkin		(substituted off) 76'
N8	8	Viktor Gresev
OF	7	Andrei Ostrikov
BF	6	Andrei Temnov		(substituted off) 70'
RL	5	Kirill Kulemin
LL	4	Alexander Voytov (c)		(substituted off) 55'
TP	3	Andrei Igretsov	(yellow card) 31'	(substituted off) 47'
HK	2	Valery Tsnobiladze		(substituted off) 57'
LP	1	Grigory Tsnobiladze
Replacements:
HK	16	Vladislav Korshunov		(substituted in) 57'
PR	17	Evgeni Pronenko		(substituted in) 47'
FL	18	Andrei Garbuzov		(substituted in) 55'
FL	19	Pavel Butenko		(substituted in) 70'
WG	20	Igor Klyuchnikov
SH	21	Alexey Shcherban		(substituted in) 76'
FB	22	Ramil Gaisin
Coach:
(France) Raphaël Saint-André

Man of the Match:
Agustín Ormaechea (Uruguay)

Touch judges:
Juan Sylvestre (Argentina)
Francisco Pastrana (Argentina)
Television match official:
Santiago Borsani (Argentina)
