= 2010–12 European Nations Cup First Division =

2010–12 European Nations Cup
- Logo of the 2010–12 European Nations Cup
- Date: 2010–12
- Countries: Division 1A: Georgia; Portugal; Spain; Russia; Romania; Ukraine; Division 1B: Belgium; Czech Republic; Germany; Moldova; Netherlands; Poland

Final positions
- Champions: Georgia (2011, 2012)
- Antim Cup: Georgia (2011, 2012)

Tournament statistics
- Matches played: Division 1A: 30 Division 1B: 30

The 2010–12 European Nations Cup is the premier rugby union competition below the Six Nations Championship in Europe.

The divisions play on a two-year cycle with the teams playing each other both home and away. From 2009 onward, the title is awarded according to a one-year ranking. Georgia won the 2011 title.

The competition was altered slightly for the 2010–2012 edition. The top division, formerly Division 1, now Division 1A, saw the relegation of Germany, which was replaced with Ukraine. The Division 1B, formerly the Division 2A, was enlarged from five to six teams. No team was relegated from this division, but the Netherlands was promoted from Division 2B.

The champions of 1B will be promoted to 1A for 2013–14, while the last placed team in each division will be relegated. Unlike the previous edition, which also functioned as the 2011 Rugby World Cup qualifying, the 2011–2012 Division 1A edition has no additional purpose.

== Division 1A ==
=== Points system ===
Table points are determined as follows:

- 4 points for a win
- 2 points for a draw
- 0 point for a loss
- 1 bonus point for scoring 4 tries in a match
- 1 bonus point for losing by 7 points or fewer

=== 2011 ===
==== Table ====
ENC 2011 champions

Place	Nation	Games				Points			Bonus points	Table points
Place	Nation	Played	Won	Drawn	Lost	For	Against	Difference	Bonus points	Table points
1	Georgia	5	5	0	0	168	35	+133	2	22
2	Romania	5	3	0	2	166	69	+97	4	16
3	Portugal	5	3	0	2	113	98	+15	2	14
4	Russia	5	2	0	3	100	98	+2	3	11
5	Spain	5	2	0	3	92	175	−83	2	10
6	Ukraine	5	0	0	5	61	225	−164	0	0

==== Results ====
5 February 2011
15:00

Georgia	62–3	Ukraine
Try: Natriashvili 5'; Samkharadze 16'; Gugava 20'; Machkhaneli 39'; Zirakashvili 41'; Kacharava 54' 60'; Urjukashvili 64'; Abuseridze 73'; Chkhaidze 80+2'; Con: Kvirikashvili (5/9); Malaghuradze (1/1)	Report	Pen: Kosariev 65'

Mikheil Meskhi Stadium, Tbilisi
Attendance: 15,000
Referee: Cyril Lafon (France)

5 February 2011
16:00

Spain	24–28	Russia
Try: Moreno 50'; Auzqui 60'; Tudela 78'; Con: Rouet (3/3); Pen: Jorajuria 34'	Report	Try: Yanushkin 24'; Ostroushko 40'; Gresev 42'; Con: Kushnarev (2/3); Pen: Kushnarev 2' 54'; Rachkov 64'

Estadio Nacional Complutense, Madrid
Attendance: 8,000
Referee: Stefano Mancini (Italy)

5 February 2011
15:00

Portugal	24–17	Romania
Try: Silva 1'; Aguilar 21'; Oliveira 25'; Con: Gardener (3/3); Pen: Gardener 15'	Report	Try: Cazan 65'; Nicolae 80'; Con: Dumbravă (1/1); Vlaicu (1/1); Pen: Dumbravă 13'

Estádio Universitário de Lisboa, Lisbon
Attendance: 3,000
Referee: David Jones (Wales)

12 February 2011
15:00

Georgia	60–0	Spain
Try: Gugava 7'; Kvirikashvili 25'; Kacharava 34'; Khamashuridze 40'; Natriashvili 52'; Zibzibadze 63' 72'; Labadze 66'; Urjukashvili 79'; Con: Kvirikashvili (4/7); Malaghuradze (2/2); Pen: Kvirikashvili 30'	Report

Mikheil Meskhi Stadium, Tbilisi
Attendance: 15,000
Referee: Greg Garner (England)

12 February 2011
14:00

Russia	19–21	Portugal
Try: Artemyev (2) 57' m, 80+5' m Pen: Kushnarev 10', 18', 27'	Report	Try: Foro 35' c Acosta 43' m Con: Gardener (1/2); Pen: Gardener 3', 16', 49'

Slava Metreveli Central Stadium, Sochi
Attendance: 85
Referee: Stéphan Pomarede (France)

26 February 2011
15:00

Portugal	12–13	Georgia
Pen: Gardener 11', 17', 43', 74'	Report	Try: Kacharava 37'; Con: Malaghuradze (1/1); Pen: Malaghuradze 13'; Kvirikashvili 60'

Estádio Universitário de Lisboa, Lisbon
Attendance: 2,000
Referee: C. Passacantando (Italy)

26 February 2011
16:00

Romania	33–3	Russia
Try: Zebega 56'; Sîrbu 59'; Carpo 67'; Con: Vlaicu (3/3); Pen: Vlaicu 7', 16', 24', 51'	Report	Pen: Kuzin 19'

Stadionul Arcul de Triumf, Bucharest
Attendance: 1,000
Referee: JP Doyle (England)

26 February 2011
16:00

Spain	35–13	Ukraine
Try: Rofes 19'; Heredia 36'; Tudela 43'; Roca 49'; Cook 76'; Con: Aubenell (5/5)	Report	Try: Novokreschenov 65'; Kirsanov 72'; Pen: Kosariev 24'

Estadio Nacional Complutense, Madrid
Attendance: 5,000
Referee: Cameron Rudkin (Scotland)

12 March 2011
15:00

Georgia	18–11	Romania
Try: Maisuradze 10'; Khamashuridze 13'; Con: Maisuradze (1/2); Pen: Kvirikashvili 5' 63'	Report	Try: Popârlan 70'; Pen: Vlaicu 24' 40'

Mikheil Meskhi Stadium, Tbilisi
Attendance: 23,541
Referee: David Wilkinson (Ireland)

12 March 2011
16:00

Spain	25–10	Portugal
Try: Ayestaran; Con: Heredia; Pen: Heredia 6	Report	Try: Silveria; Pen: Gardener 13'

Madrid
Attendance: 9,000
Referee: Mauro Dordolo (Italy)

12 March 2011
15:00

Ukraine	5–41	Russia
Try: Kravchenko 43'	Report	Try: Grachev 18'; Shakirov 30'; Fatakhov 40+5'; Korshunov 46'; Ostrousko 60'; Galinovsky 79'; Con: Rachkov (3) 19', 31', 40+6'; Kluycnikov 61'; Pen: Rachkov 14'

Odesa
Referee: Éric Gauzins (France)

19 March 2011
15:00

Russia	9–15	Georgia
Pen: Rachkov 3' 67' 70'	Report	Try: Penalty try 50'; Bregvadze 77'; Con: Kvirikashvili 51'; Pen: Kvirikashvili 27'

Slava Metreveli Central Stadium, Sochi
Attendance: 1,000
Referee: Patrick Pechambert (France)

19 March 2011

Romania	64–8	Spain
Try: Fercu 2'; Gál 32'; Plottschi 44' / Ursache 50'; Lemnaru 54'; Calafetanu 65' 72'; Dunitras 75' 79'; Con: Dumbravă 3' 33' 45' 51'; Vlaicu 66' 73' 76' 80'; Pen: Dumbravă 25'	Report	Try: R. Delgado 60'; Pen: Jorajuria 38'

Stadionul Arcul de Triumf, Bucharest
Attendance: 2,200
Referee: Johann van der Merwe (Scotland)

19 March 2011
15:00

Portugal	46–24	Ukraine
	Report

Estádio Universitário de Lisboa, Lisbon
Referee: Dudley Phillips (Ireland)

20 August 2011

Ukraine	16–41	Romania

Sokil Stadium, Lviv
Referee: Leighton Hodges (Wales)

- The scheduled match between Ukraine and Romania on 12 February 2011 was postponed due to snow and freezing weather in Kyiv on the planned matchday, and was rescheduled to 20 August in Lviv.

=== 2012 ===
==== Table ====
ENC 2012 champions

Place	Nation	Games				Points			Bonus points	Table points
Place	Nation	Played	Won	Drawn	Lost	For	Against	Difference	Bonus points	Table points
1	Georgia	5	4	0	1	148	48	+100	4	20
2	Spain	5	3	0	2	133	100	+33	4	16
3	Romania	5	3	0	2	136	39	+97	4	16
4	Russia	5	3	0	2	112	159	−47	2	14
5	Portugal	5	1	0	4	102	132	−30	3	7
6	Ukraine	5	1	0	4	63	216	−153	1	5

==== Results ====
4 February 2012
14:00 UTC+2

Romania	15–7	Portugal
Try: Lemnaru 5'; Ursache 65'; Con: Vlaicu 65'; Pen: Vlaicu 79'	Report	Try: Aguilar 23'; Con: Leal 23'

Stadionul Arcul de Triumf, Bucharest
Attendance: 750
Referee: Mark Patton (Ireland)

4 February 2012

Ukraine	P–P	Georgia

11 February 2012
16:00 UTC+1

Spain	25–18	Georgia
Try: Sempere (2) 6', 44'; Visensang 18'; Con: Peluchon (2) 19', 45'; Pen: Peluchon (2) 3', 38'	Report	Try: Basilaia 8'; Machkaneli 58'; Datunashvili 69'; Pen: Kvirikashvili 36'

Estadio Nacional Complutense, Madrid
Referee: David Wilkinson (Ireland)

11 February 2012
15:00 UTC+0

Portugal	32–33	Russia
Try: Spachuck 31'; Gardener 34'; Foro (2) 64', 76'; Con: Ricardo (3) 32', 35', 65'; Pen: Ricardo 22'; Drop: Ricardo 26'	Report	Try: Ostroushko (2) 39', 60'; Simplikevich 46'; Con: Kushnarev (3) 40', 47', 61'; Pen: Ryabov (3) 11', 15', 28'; Kushnarev 45'

Estádio Nacional, Lisbon
Referee: Ian Davies (Wales)

11 February 2012

Romania	P–P	Ukraine

25 February 2012
14:00 UTC+4

Georgia	32–7	Portugal
Try: Basilaia 35'; Samkharadze 46'; Nariashvili 61'; Mamukashvili 78'; Con: Berishvili (3) 35', 46', 78'; Pen: Berishvili (2) 42', 53'	Report	Try: Bardy 74'; Con: Ricardo 74'

Tbilisi
Referee: Marius Mitrea (Italy)

25 February 2012
14:00 UTC+4

Russia	0–25	Romania
	Report	Try: Carpo 8'; Penalty try 33'; Apostol 47'; Petre 51'; Con: Vlaicu 34'; Pen: Calafeteanu 68'

Slava Metreveli Central Stadium, Sochi
Referee: Cédric Marchat (France)

25 February 2012
12:00 UTC+2

Ukraine	6–41	Spain
Pen: Kosariev (2) 14', 38'	Report	Try: Phipps 10'; Sempere (2) 30', 47'; Visensang 53'; Peluchon 68'; Con: Sempere 10'; Peluchon (4) 30', 47', 53', 68'; Pen: Peluchon (2) 21', 26'

Spartak Stadium, Alushta
Referee: R. Thomas (Wales)

10 March 2012
17:00 UTC+2

Romania	13–19	Georgia
Try: Carpo 8'; Con: Vlaicu 8'; Pen: Calafeteanu (2) 32', 45'	Report	Try: Kacharava 48'; Con: Kvirikashvili 48'; Pen: Kvirikashvili (4) 18', 34', 61', 77'

Stadionul Arcul de Triumf, Bucharest
Referee: JP Doyle (England)

10 March 2012
15:00 UTC+0

Portugal	23–17	Spain
Try: V. Uva 50'; Tadjer 69'; Pen: P. Leal 17'; Drop: P. Leal (2) 36', 75'		Try: Auzqui 39'; Pen: Peluchon 25'; Drop: Peluchon (3) 47', 54', 58'

Sergio Conceição, Coimbra
Referee: Claudio Passacantando (Italy)

10 March 2012

Russia	38–19	Ukraine

Sochi
Referee: V. Iordachescu (Romania)

17 March 2012
15:00 UTC+4

Georgia	46–0	Russia

Tbilisi
Referee: Mathieu Raynal (France)

17 March 2012
14:00 UTC+2

Ukraine	35–33	Portugal
Try: Tserkovnuiy 31'; Malaguradze 51'; Monastyrov 60'; Ponomarenko 74'; Con: Kosariev (3) 31', 60', 74'; Pen: Kosariev (3) 26', 42', 84'	Report	Try: Aguilar (2) 35', 42'; Uva 80'; Con: Ricardo 42'; Costa 80'; Pen: Ricardo (4) 12', 29', 40', 55'

Odesa
Referee: Laurent Cardona (France)

17 March 2012
16:00 UTC+1

Spain	13–12	Romania
Try: Rolls 46'; Con: Aubanell 46'; Pen: Peluchon 17'; Drop: Peluchon 77'	Report	Pen: Calafeteanu (4) 7', 23', 66', 74'

Estadio Nacional Complutense, Madrid
Attendance: 9,500
Referee: Cammy Rudkin (Scotland)

31 March 2012

Romania	71–0	Ukraine

Stadionul Arcul de Triumf, Bucharest

19 May 2012
15:00

Russia	41–37	Spain
Try: Artemyev (2) 27', 52'; Antonov 34'; Ostroushko 56'; Con: Kushnarev (3/4); Pen: Kushnarev (5) 9', 17', 42', 48', 77'	Report	Try: Labadie 44'; Ascarat (2) 65', 74'; Blanco 81'; Con: Pelushon (4/4); Pen: Pelushon (3) 6', 20', 50'

Slava Stadium, Moscow
Referee: Andrew Small (England)

9 June 2012

Ukraine	3–33	Georgia

=== Overall table ===
Relegated to Division 1B

Place	Nation	Games				Points			Bonus points	Table points
Place	Nation	Played	Won	Drawn	Lost	For	Against	Difference	Bonus points	Table points
1	Georgia	10	9	0	1	316	83	+233	6	42
2	Romania	10	6	0	4	302	118	+184	8	32
3	Spain	10	5	0	5	225	275	−50	6	26
4	Russia	10	5	0	5	212	257	−45	5	25
5	Portugal	10	4	0	6	215	230	−15	5	21
6	Ukraine	10	1	0	9	124	442	−318	1	5

== Division 1B ==
=== 2010–11 ===
2011 champions

Place	Nation	Games				Points			Table points
Place	Nation	Played	Won	Drawn	Lost	For	Against	Difference	Table points
1	Belgium	5	4	0	1	123	88	+35	18
2	Moldova	5	4	0	1	115	91	+24	18
3	Poland	5	3	0	2	122	112	+10	14
4	Czech Republic	5	3	0	2	102	99	+3	12
5	Germany	5	1	0	4	109	117	−8	7
6	Netherlands	5	0	0	5	74	138	−64	1

==== Results ====
9 October 2010
13:00

Czech Republic	20–15	Poland
Try: Okleštěk 40', Rohlík 77'; Con: Vokrouhlík 40', Čížek 77'; Pen: Vokrouhlík (2) 44', 47'	Report	Try: Hotowski (2) 37', 79'; Con: Chartier 37'; Pen: Chartier 55'

Stadion RC Tatra Smíchov, Prague
Referee: Patrick Beuriot (France)

13 November 2010
18:00

Poland	25–36	Moldova
Try: Beccuau (2) 31', 40'; Siepielski 25'; Con: Banaszek (2) 25', 31'; Pen: Banaszek (2) 10', 54'	Report	Try: Titica (2) 4', 58'; Prepeliţă (2) 37', 45'; Castraveţ 76'; Con: Gagauz (3) 4', 37', 58'; V. Cobîlaș 76'; Pen: Gagauz 12'

Narodowy Stadion Rugby, Gdynia
Referee: Pikhovin (Russia)

13 November 2010

Czech Republic	12–24	Belgium
	Report

Prague

20 November 2010
14:30

Germany	17–22	Poland
Try: Güngör 7', Hauck 14'; Con: Heimpel (2) 7', 14'; Pen: Heimpel 43'	Report	Try: Bobryk 47'; Con: Chartier 47'; Pen: Chartier (5) 11', 33', 37', 53', 55'

Frankfurt
Attendance: 1,000
Referee: Pedro Murinello (Portugal)

20 November 2010

Netherlands	13–25	Czech Republic
	Report

Amsterdam

27 November 2010
14:30

Netherlands	10–29	Germany
Try: Blom 11', Cornelisse 18'	Report	Try: Widiker 7', Liebig 37', Keinhorst 80'; Con: Heimpel 37'; Pen: Heimpel (4) 16', 36', 45', 76'

Amsterdam
Referee: Stephano Marrama (Italy)

12 January 2011

Belgium	20–5	Moldova
	Report

Brussels

12 March 2011
14:30

Germany	23–29	Czech Republic
Try: G. Franke 16', Schmidt 55'; Con: Heimpel (2) 16', 55'; Pen: Heimpel (3) 9', 30', 67'	Report	Try: Kutil (2) 12', 40'; Con: Vokrouhlík (2) 12', 40'; Pen: Vokrouhlík (5) 6', 18', 33', 38', 53'

Fritz-Grunebaum-Sportpark, Heidelberg
Attendance: 2,000
Referee: Tony Raduta (Romania)

12 March 2011

Poland	28–21	Belgium
	Report

Narodowy Stadion Rugby, Gdynia

19 March 2011
15:00

Belgium	28–25	Germany
Try: Berger (2) 26', 36', Williams 59'; Con: Williams (2) 36', 59'; Pen: Williams (3) 5', 7', 68'	Report	Try: Jordaan (2) 17', 77', Strauch 74'; Con: Heimpel 17', Güngör 77'; Pen: Heimpel (2) 10', 40'

Brussels
Referee: Félix Villegas (Spain)

19 March 2011
15:00

Moldova	24–16	Czech Republic
	Report

Chişinău
Referee: Marius Mitrea (Italy)

2 April 2011
15:00

Moldova	28–15	Germany
Try: Prepelita (2) 10', 56', Arhip 74'; Con: Gagauz (2) 10', 74'; Pen: Gagauz (3) 19', 35', 53'	(Report)	Try: Kasten 39', Liebig 47'; Con: Güngör 47'; Pen: G. Franke 37'

Dynamo Stadium, Chişinău
Attendance: 3,000
Referee: Radu Petrescu (Romania)

16 April 2011

Poland	32–18	Netherlands

Stadion Suche Stawy

23 April 2011

Netherlands	18–30	Belgium

30 April 2011

Moldova	22–15	Netherlands

=== 2011–12 ===
2012 champions

Place	Nation	Games				Points			Table points
Place	Nation	Played	Won	Drawn	Lost	For	Against	Difference	Table points
1	Belgium	5	5	0	0	180	61	+119	21
2	Poland	5	3	1	1	116	77	+39	17
3	Germany	5	3	0	2	120	95	+25	15
4	Czech Republic	5	1	0	4	58	118	−60	8
5	Moldova	5	1	1	3	79	120	−41	8
6	Netherlands	5	1	0	4	79	161	−82	5

==== Results ====
15 October 2011

Poland	20–13	Czech Republic

Nowy Sacz
Referee: A. Hadj Bachir (France)

5 November 2011

Belgium	55–0	Czech Republic

Brussels
Referee: A. Vivarini (Italy)

12 November 2011

Germany	23–7	Netherlands

Hanover
Referee: Murinello (Portugal)

12 November 2011

Moldova	17–17	Poland

Chișinău
Referee: Radu Petrescu (Romania)

19 November 2011

Poland	34–8	Germany

Gdańsk
Referee: Gallastegi (Spain)

19 November 2011

Czech Republic	22–10	Netherlands

Tatra Smichov Stadium, Prague
Referee: Voloivk (Russia)

26 November 2011

Czech Republic	6–13	Moldova

Ricany Stadium, Prague

25 February 2012

Belgium	58–3	Netherlands

Brussels

10 March 2012

Moldova	16–17	Belgium

Chișinău

10 March 2012

Czech Republic	17–20	Germany

Prague

17 March 2012

Germany	29–30	Belgium

Heusenstamm

24 March 2012

Germany	40–7	Moldova
Try: Kasten 28' m, 51' m May 39' m Eckert 55' c Manawatu 69' c Strauch 75' m Con: Hilsenbeck (2) 55', 69'; Pen: Manawatu 4', 11'		Try: Arhip 31' c Con: Gagauz

Heidelberg

7 April 2012

Belgium	20–13	Poland

Brussels
Referee: Murinello (Portugal)

7 April 2012

Netherlands	40–26	Moldova

Amsterdam

21 April 2012

Netherlands	19–32	Poland

Amsterdam

=== Overall table ===
Promoted to Division 1A
Relegated for 2012–14

Place	Nation	Games				Points			Table points
Place	Nation	Played	Won	Drawn	Lost	For	Against	Difference	Table points
1	Belgium	10	9	0	1	303	149	+154	39
2	Poland	10	6	1	3	238	189	+49	31
3	Moldova	10	5	1	4	194	211	−17	26
4	Germany	10	4	0	6	229	212	+17	22
5	Czech Republic	10	4	0	6	160	217	−57	20
6	Netherlands	10	1	0	9	153	299	−146	6

== See also ==
- European Nations Cup (rugby union)
- FIRA – Association of European Rugby
- Six Nations Championship
- Antim Cup
