= 2015 Rugby World Cup – Europe qualification =

Tournament details
- Dates: 6 October 2012 – 24 May 2014
- No. of nations: 31

The European Zone of qualification for the 2015 Rugby World Cup saw 31 teams competing for two places at the finals in England and one place in the Repechage playoff. Georgia and Romania qualified directly to the Rugby World Cup as Europe 1 and Europe 2, and will play in Pools C and D respectively. Russia finished third to qualify for the repechage playoff, but losing to Uruguay in the final Qualification round.

== Format ==
31 national teams from FIRA–AER (which changed its name to Rugby Europe during the qualifying cycle) entered qualification, and two or three teams could qualify for the 2015 World Cup. The qualification format was the same as that used for 2011 competition. The teams competed in two groups of six teams, three groups of five and one group of four. There were two levels of playoff. The direct qualification to the 2015 Rugby World Cup (Round 5) took place in the 2012–2014 European Nations Cup - Division 1A, with Georgia and Romania qualifying directly to the 2015 Rugby World Cup as Europe 1 and Europe 2.

Each winning team in the 2012-2013 European Nations Cup Division 2 played off in succession, starting with the lowest two divisions. After the 2013–14 season, the winning team from Division 2 (Netherlands) played off against the winner of Division 1B (Germany). Germany won this match and played off against Russia, who finished third in Division 1A. Russia won this match and qualified for the repechage. No team from the 2012–14 3rd division tournament was eligible to qualify for the Rugby World Cup.

== Entrants ==
The 2015 Rugby World Cup qualifying teams that competed for the 2015 Rugby World Cup – European qualification. (World rankings, shown in brackets, are to first European qualification match on 6 October 2012)

- Austria (84)
- Andorra (62)
- Belgium (23)
- Bosnia and Herzegovina (87)
- Bulgaria (79)
- Croatia (44)
- Czech Republic (40)
- Denmark (61)
- Finland (96)
- Georgia (15)
- Germany (31)
- Greece (NR)
- Hungary (85)
- Israel (56)
- Latvia (72)
- Lithuania (36)
- Luxembourg (95)
- Malta (45)
- Moldova (34)
- Netherlands (47)
- Norway (93)
- Poland (28)
- Portugal (26)
- Romania (18)
- Russia (19)
- Serbia (73)
- Slovenia (81)
- Spain (20)
- Sweden (38)
- Switzerland (52)
- Ukraine (30)

=== Qualified nations ===
- England (Automatic qualifier)
- France (Automatic qualifier)
- Georgia (Europe 1)
- Ireland (Automatic qualifier)
- Italy (Automatic qualifier)
- Romania (Europe 2)
- Scotland (Automatic qualifier)
- Wales (Automatic qualifier)

== Round 1 ==
=== Round 1A: European Nations Cup Division 2D 2012–13 ===
The winner of Round 1A, Luxembourg, advanced to the Round 1 Final to play the winner of Division 2C, Slovenia. The other four teams were eliminated from Rugby World Cup qualifying.

| Pos | Team | Pld | W | D | L | PF | PA | PD | BP | Pts | Qualification |
|---|---|---|---|---|---|---|---|---|---|---|---|
| 1 | Luxembourg | 4 | 3 | 0 | 1 | 74 | 62 | +12 | 0 | 12 | Advances to Round 1 Final |
| 2 | Norway | 4 | 2 | 0 | 2 | 65 | 48 | +17 | 3 | 11 | |
| 3 | Bosnia and Herzegovina | 4 | 2 | 0 | 2 | 78 | 71 | +7 | 2 | 10 | |
| 4 | Greece | 4 | 2 | 0 | 2 | 61 | 64 | −3 | 1 | 9 | |
| 5 | Finland | 4 | 1 | 0 | 3 | 45 | 78 | −33 | 2 | 6 | |

Rules for classification: Points were awarded to the teams as follows: Win - 4 points; Draw - 2 points; 4 or more tries - 1 point; Loss within 7 points - 1 point; Loss greater than 7 points - 0 points

Matches

6 October 2012
15:00 EEST (UTC+03)

| (1 BP) Finland | 14–16 | Luxembourg |
| | Stats |

Myllypuro Sports Park, Helsinki
Referee: Michael Vestorp (Denmark)

20 October 2012
15:00 CEST (UTC+02)

| (1 BP) Norway | 32–3 | Finland |
| | Stats |

Bislett Stadion, Oslo
Referee: Kacper Michalkiewicz (Poland)

3 November 2012
15:00 CET (UTC+01)

| Norway | 11–9 | Bosnia and Herzegovina (1 BP) |
| | Stats |

Fana Stadion, Bergen
Referee: Ramonas Grumbinas (Lithuania)

10 November 2012
15:00 CET (UTC+01)

| Luxembourg | 15–8 | Norway (1 BP) |
| | Stats |

Stade Josy Barthel, Luxembourg, Luxembourg
Attendance: 700
Referee: Christophe Secat (Switzerland)

17 November 2012
14:30 CET (UTC+01)

| Greece | 22–17 | Bosnia and Herzegovina (1 BP) |
| | Stats |

Kaftanzoglio Stadium, Thessaloniki
Referee: Afonso Nogueira (Portugal)

30 March 2013
14:30 EET (UTC+02)

| (1 BP) Greece | 11–13 | Finland |
| | Stats |

Dasos Haidariou Municipal Stadium, Athens
Attendance: 300
Referee: Csaba Priskin (Hungary)

13 April 2013
14:00 CEST (UTC+02)

| Bosnia and Herzegovina | 33–23 | Luxembourg |
| | Stats |

Stadion Tosk, Tešanj
Attendance: 800
Referee: Alan Falzone (Italy)

13 April 2013
15:00 EEST (UTC+03)

| Greece | 21–14 | Norway (1 BP) |
| | Stats |

Dasos Haidariou Municipal Stadium, Athens
Referee: Ariel Cabral (Israel)

20 April 2013
16:00 CEST (UTC+02)

| Luxembourg | 20–7 | Greece |
| | Stats |

Stade Josy Barthel, Luxembourg, Luxembourg
Attendance: 500
Referee: Christian Doering (Denmark)

20 April 2013
14:00 CEST (UTC+02)

| Bosnia and Herzegovina | 19–15 | Finland (1 BP) |
| | Stats |

Bilino Polje, Zenica
Referee: Paulo Duarte (Portugal)

=== Round 1B: European Nations Cup Division 2C 2012–13 ===
The winner of Round 1B, Slovenia, advanced to Round 1 Final and will play the winner of Division 2D, Luxembourg. The other three teams were eliminated from Rugby World Cup qualifying.

| Pos | Team | Pld | W | D | L | PF | PA | PD | BP | Pts | Qualification |
|---|---|---|---|---|---|---|---|---|---|---|---|
| 1 | Slovenia | 3 | 2 | 0 | 1 | 44 | 47 | −3 | 2 | 10 | Advances to Round 1 Final |
| 2 | Hungary | 3 | 2 | 0 | 1 | 46 | 41 | +5 | 1 | 9 | |
| 3 | Bulgaria | 3 | 2 | 0 | 1 | 55 | 49 | +6 | 1 | 9 | |
| 4 | Austria | 3 | 0 | 0 | 3 | 37 | 45 | −8 | 3 | 3 | |

Rules for classification: Points were awarded to the teams as follows: Win - 4 points; Draw - 2 points; 4 or more tries - 1 point; Loss within 7 points - 1 point; Loss greater than 7 points - 0 points

Matches

6 October 2012
14:00 CEST (UTC+02)

| Hungary | 28–23 | Bulgaria (1 BP) |
| | Stats |

Széktói Stadion, Kecskemét
Referee: Jean-Luc Rebollal (France)

20 October 2012
14:00 EEST (UTC+03)

| Bulgaria | 12–7 | Austria (1 BP) |
| | Stats |

National Sports Academy, Sofia
Referee: Gia Amirkhanashvili (Georgia)

27 October 2012
15:00 CEST (UTC+02)

| Slovenia | 8–7 | Hungary (1 BP) |
| | Stats |

Oval Stanezici, Ljubljana
Attendance: 400
Referee: George Kaloxilos (Georgia)

6 April 2013
16:00 CEST (UTC+02)

| (1 BP) Austria | 10–11 | Hungary |
| | Stats | Cards: Andre Brand (yellow card) 21'; Gareth Lloyd (yellow card) 25' |

Sportanlage Dirnelwiese, Vienna
Attendance: 500
Referee: Stepan Cekal (Czech Republic

6 April 2013
14:00 EEST (UTC+03)

| Bulgaria | 20–14 | Slovenia (1 BP) |
| | Stats |

National Sports Academy, Sofia
Attendance: 500
Referee: Sergii Poplavskyi (Ukraine)

20 April 2013
14:00 CEST (UTC+02)

| (1 BP) Slovenia | 22–20 | Austria (1 BP) |
| | Stats |

Oval Stanezici, Ljubljana
Referee: Iñaki Atorrasagasti (Spain)

=== Round 1 Final ===
Luxembourg, the winner of Round 1A, defeated Slovenia, the winner of Round 1B, to advance to Round 2 Final to play Israel.

5 May 2013
16:00 CEST (UTC+02)

| Luxembourg | 22–10 | Slovenia |
| | Report |

Stade Josy Barthel, Luxembourg
Attendance: 800
Referee: Claudio Blessano (Italy)

== Round 2 ==
=== Round 2A: European Nations Cup Division 2B 2012–13 ===
The winner of Round 2A, Israel, advanced to Round 2 Final to play the winner of Round 1. The other four teams were eliminated from Rugby World Cup qualifying.

| Pos | Team | Pld | W | D | L | PF | PA | PD | BP | Pts | Qualification |
|---|---|---|---|---|---|---|---|---|---|---|---|
| 1 | Israel | 4 | 4 | 0 | 0 | 137 | 45 | +92 | 3 | 19 | Advances to Round 2 Final |
| 2 | Latvia | 4 | 2 | 0 | 2 | 85 | 82 | +3 | 3 | 11 | |
| 3 | Denmark | 4 | 1 | 1 | 2 | 62 | 79 | −17 | 1 | 7 | |
| 4 | Andorra | 4 | 1 | 1 | 2 | 48 | 77 | −29 | 0 | 6 | |
| 5 | Serbia | 4 | 1 | 0 | 3 | 84 | 133 | −49 | 2 | 6 | |

Rules for classification: Points were awarded to the teams as follows: Win - 4 points; Draw - 2 points; 4 or more tries - 1 point; Loss within 7 points - 1 point; Loss greater than 7 points - 0 points

Matches

13 October 2012
15:00 CEST (UTC+02)

| Denmark | 6–6 | Andorra |
| | Stats |

Odense Atletikstadion, Odense
Attendance: 500
Referee: Mike Hoyer (Netherlands)

13 October 2012
14:00 (IST) (UTC+02)

| (1 BP) Israel | 48–22 | Serbia |
| | Stats |

Wingate Institute, Netanya
Referee: Frank Himmer (Germany)

27 October 2012
15:00 CEST (UTC+02)

| Andorra | 5–26 | Israel (1 BP) |
| | Stats |

M.I.C.G., Andorra la Vella
Referee: Ken Lambrechts (Belgium)

27 October 2012
14:00 CEST (UTC+02)

| (1 BP) Serbia | 39–21 | Latvia |
| | Stats |

Stadion Milicionar, Belgrade
Referee: Sergii Poplavskyi (Ukraine)

3 November 2012
14:00 EET (UTC+02)

| (1 BP) Latvia | 27–15 | Denmark |
| | Stats |

Daugava Stadium, Riga
Referee: Ucha Narimanidze (Georgia)

3 November 2012
14:00 CET (UTC+01)

| (1 BP) Serbia | 23–26 | Andorra |
| | Stats |

Stadion Milicionar, Belgrade
Referee: Grzegorz Michalik (Poland)

30 March 2013
15:00 CEST (UTC+02)

| Andorra | 11–22 | Latvia (1 BP) |
| | Stats |

M.I.C.G., Andorra la Vella
Referee: Hrvoje Bartolic (Croatia)

6 April 2013
15:00 (IST) (UTC+02)

| Israel | 17–15 | Latvia (1 BP) |
| | Stats |

Wingate Institute, Netanya
Referee: Mario Jelavic (Croatia)

13 April 2013
14:00 CEST (UTC+02)

| (1 BP) Denmark | 38–0 | Serbia |
| | Stats |

Odense Atletikstadion, Odense
Attendance: 300
Referee: George Mossford (Finland)

20 April 2013
15:00 (IST) (UTC+02)

| (1 BP) Israel | 46–3 | Denmark |
| | Stats |

Wingate Institute, Netanya
Attendance: 1,000
Referee: Tomáš Tuma (Czech Republic)

=== Round 2 Final ===
Israel, the winner of Round 2A, played the winner of Round 1, Luxembourg, to advance to the Round 3 Final to play Netherlands.

5 October 2013
15:00 CEST (UTC+02)

| Luxembourg | 12–26 | Israel |
| | Stats |

Stade Josy Barthel, Luxembourg
Attendance: 1,250
Referee: Iñigo Atorrasagasti (Spain)

== Round 3 ==
=== Round 3A: European Nations Cup Division 2A 2012–13 ===
The winner of Round 3A, Netherlands, advanced to Round 3 Final to play the winner of Round 2. The other four teams were eliminated from Rugby World Cup qualifying.

| Pos | Team | Pld | W | D | L | PF | PA | PD | Pts | Qualification |
|---|---|---|---|---|---|---|---|---|---|---|
| 1 | Netherlands | 4 | 4 | 0 | 0 | 125 | 57 | +68 | 18 | Advances to Round 3 Final |
| 2 | Switzerland | 4 | 3 | 0 | 1 | 92 | 75 | +17 | 14 | |
| 3 | Croatia | 4 | 1 | 0 | 3 | 78 | 92 | −14 | 6 | |
| 4 | Malta | 4 | 1 | 0 | 3 | 73 | 104 | −31 | 5 | |
| 5 | Lithuania | 4 | 1 | 0 | 3 | 69 | 109 | −40 | 4 | |

Rules for classification: Points were awarded to the teams as follows: Win - 4 points; Draw - 2 points; 4 or more tries - 1 point; Loss within 7 points - 1 point; Loss greater than 7 points - 0 points

Matches

27 October 2012
14:00 CEST (UTC+02)

| Croatia | 20–19 | Malta (1 BP) |
| | Stats |

City Stadium, Makarska
Referee: Tomáš Tuma (Czech Republic)

3 November 2012
14:30 CET (UTC+01)

| Malta | 34–17 | Lithuania |
| | Stats |

Hibernians Ground, Paola
Attendance: 3,000
Referee: Luc Janssens (Belgium)

3 November 2012
15:00 CET (UTC+01)

| (1 BP) Switzerland | 29–20 | Croatia |
| | Stats |

Stade de Colovray, Nyon
Attendance: 1,053
Referee: Pedro Montoya (Spain)

10 November 2012
14:00 EET (UTC+02)

| Lithuania | 16–24 | Netherlands |
| | Stats |

Radviliškio miesto centrinis stadionas, Šiauliai
Referee: Alexey Bryzgalin (Russia)

17 November 2012
15:00 CET (UTC+01)

| Netherlands | 24–7 | Switzerland |
| | Stats |

National Rugby Centre, Amsterdam
Referee: Frank Himmer (Germany)

6 April 2013
14:00 CEST (UTC+02)

| Malta | 10–19 | Switzerland |
| | Stats |

Hibernians Ground, Paola
Attendance: 3,000
Referee: Vlad Iordăchescu (Romania)

13 April 2013
16:00 CEST (UTC+02)

| (1 BP) Switzerland | 37–21 | Lithuania |
| | Stats |

Stade de Colovray, Nyon
Attendance: 1,545
Referee: Stefano Penne (Italy)

13 April 2013
15:00 CEsT (UTC+02)

| (1 BP) Netherlands | 48–10 | Malta |
| | Stats |

National Rugby Centre, Amsterdam
Attendance: 1,012
Referee: Tomasz Jarowicz (Poland)

20 April 2013
14:1 CEST (UTC+02)

| (1 BP) Croatia | 24–29 | Netherlands (1 BP) |
| | Stats |

City Stadium, Makarska
Referee: Marcin Zeszutek (Poland)

27 April 2013
15:00 EET (UTC+02)

| Lithuania | 15–14 | Croatia (1 BP) |
| | Stats |

Academy of Rugby, Vilnius
Attendance: 2,000
Referee: Volovik Vladimir (Russia)

=== Round 3 Final ===
Netherlands, the winner of Round 3A, played the winner of Round 2, Israel, for the right to advance to Round 4 Final to play the winner of 2012-13 Division 2A, Germany.

26 October 2013
15:00 IST (UTC+02)

| Israel | 8–52 | Netherlands |
| | Stats |

Wingate Institute, Netanya
Attendance: 1,290
Referee: Jerome Lamirand (France)

== Round 4 ==
=== Round 4A: Division 1B 2012–14 ===
The winner of Division 1B, Germany, advanced to Round 4 Final to play the winner of Round 3. The other five teams were eliminated from Rugby World Cup qualifying.

| Pos | Team | Pld | W | D | L | PF | PA | PD | BP | Pts | Qualification | GER | MDA | UKR | POL | SWE | CZE |
|---|---|---|---|---|---|---|---|---|---|---|---|---|---|---|---|---|---|
| 1 | Germany | 10 | 8 | 0 | 2 | 398 | 180 | +218 | 7 | 39 | Advances to Round 4 final | — | 32–14 | 46–28 | 43–13 | 73–17 | 76–12 |
| 2 | Moldova | 10 | 7 | 0 | 3 | 267 | 228 | +39 | 6 | 34 | | 30–15 | — | 28–8 | 24–20 | 50–20 | 37–12 |
| 3 | Ukraine | 10 | 5 | 0 | 5 | 227 | 227 | 0 | 4 | 24 | | 16–28 | 18–38 | — | 29–28 | 35–11 | 42–15 |
| 4 | Poland | 10 | 5 | 0 | 5 | 208 | 183 | +25 | 2 | 22 | | 22–13 | 12–21 | 13–12 | — | 30–9 | 30–10 |
| 5 | Sweden | 10 | 3 | 0 | 7 | 193 | 307 | −114 | 2 | 14 | | 20–45 | 54–6 | 10–22 | 19–11 | — | 11–17 |
| 6 | Czech Republic | 10 | 2 | 0 | 8 | 142 | 310 | −168 | 3 | 11 | | 8–27 | 37–19 | 10–17 | 3–29 | 18–22 | — |

Rules for classification: Points were awarded to the teams as follows: Win - 4 points; Draw - 2 points; 4 or more tries - 1 point; Loss within 7 points - 1 point; Loss greater than 7 points - 0 points

Matches 2012–2013

6 October 2012
14:05 CEST (UTC+02)

| Czech Republic | 3–29 | Poland |
| | Stats |

Stadion Josefa Kohouta, Říčany
Referee: Jean Pierre Matheu (France)

20 October 2012
15:00 CEST (UTC+02)

| Sweden | 10–22 | Ukraine |
| | Stats |

Kristinebergs IP, Stockholm
Attendance: 789
Referee: Pedro Murinello (Portugal)

27 October 2012
15:00 CEST (UTC+02)

| (1 BP) Sweden | 54–6 | Moldova |
| | Stats |

Kristinebergs IP, Stockholm
Referee: Igotz Gallastegi (Spain)

27 October 2012
14:30 CEST (UTC+02)

| (1 BP) Germany | 46–28 | Ukraine (1 BP) |
| | Stats |

SC Siemensstadt, Berlin
Attendance: 1,100
Referee: Robert Diaconescu (Romania)

3 November 2012
17:00 CET (UTC+01)

| Poland | 22–13 | Germany |
| | Stats |

MOSiR Stadium, Gdańsk
Referee: Vladim Pikhovkin (Russia)

10 November 2012
14:00 CET (UTC+01)

| (1 BP) Czech Republic | 18–22 | Sweden |
| | Stats |

Tatra Smichov Stadium, Prague
Referee: Ken Lambrechts (Belgium)

17 November 2012
15:00 CET (UTC+01)

| (1 BP) Germany | 32–14 | Moldova |
| | Stats |

Fritz-Grunebaum-Sportpark, Heidelberg
Referee: Claudio Blessano (Italy)

17 November 2012
13:00 EET (UTC+02)

| Ukraine | 42–15 | Czech Republic |
| | Stats |

Meteor Stadium, Dnipropetrovsk
Referee: Radu Petrescu (Romania)

9 March 2013
14:00 CET (UTC+01)

| Czech Republic | 8–27 | Germany (1 BP) |
| | Stats |

CE Group Rugby Arena, Prague
Attendance: 500
Referee: Vlad Iordăchescu (Romania)

16 March 2013
16:00 EET (UTC+02)

| (1 BP) Moldova | 37–12 | Czech Republic |
| | Stats |

Dinamo Stadium, Chișinău
Attendance: 2,000
Referee: Andrea Spadoni (Italy)

30 March 2013
15:00 CET (UTC+01)

| Poland | 13–12 | Ukraine (1 BP) |
| | Stats |

Stadion GOSiR, Gdynia
Referee: Lloyd Linton (Scotland)

6 April 2013
14:30 CEST (UTC+02)

| (1 BP) Germany | 73–17 | Sweden |
| | Stats |

Wolfgang-Meyer-Sportanlage, Hamburg
Attendance: 3,500
Referee: Pedro Montoya (Spain)

7 April 2013
14:35 EEST (UTC+03)

| Ukraine | 18–38 | Moldova (1 BP) |
| | Stats |

Spartak Stadium, Odesa
Attendance: 4,500
Referee: Radu Petrescu (Romania)

13 April 2013
13:00 EEST (UTC+03)

| (1 BP) Moldova | 24–20 | Poland |
| | Stats |

Dinamo Stadium, Chișinău
Referee: Cyril Lafon (France)

1 June 2013
14:30 CEST (UTC+02)

| Sweden | 19–11 | Poland (1 BP) |
| | Stats |

Enköpings RK, Enköping
Attendance: 600
Referee: Afonso Nogueira (Portugal)

Matches 2013–2014

7 September 2013
15:00 CEST (UTC+02)

| Poland | 30–9 | Sweden |
| | Stats |

Polonia Stadium, Warsaw
Referee: Burlet Maxime (Belgium)

12 October 2013
20:00 CEST (UTC+02)

| Poland | 30–10 | Czech Republic |
| | Stats |

Polonia Stadium, Warsaw
Attendance: 4,500
Referee: Frank Himmer (Germany)

19 October 2013
15:00 CEST (UTC+02)

| (1 BP) Sweden | 11–17 | Czech Republic |
| | Stats |

Kristinebergs IP, Stockholm
Attendance: 478
Referee: Alexei Bryzgalin (Russia)

26 October 2013
14:00 EET (UTC+03)

| Ukraine | 16–28 | Germany |
| | Stats |

Metalist Stadium, Kharkiv
Referee: Vlad Iordăchescu (Romania)

2 November 2013
13:00 EET (UTC+02)

| (1 BP) Ukraine | 35–11 | Sweden |
| | Stats |

Uni. of Tax Service, Kyiv
Attendance: 2,000
Referee: Radu Petrescu (Romania)

9 November 2013
12:00 EET (UTC+02)

| (1 BP) Moldova | 50–20 | Sweden |
| | Stats |

Dinamo Stadium, Chișinău
Attendance: 1,000
Referee: Andrea Spadoni (Italy)

9 November 2013
14:30 CET (UTC+01)

| (1 BP) Germany | 43–13 | Poland |
| | Stats |

Sportforum, Berlin
Referee: Cammy Rudkin (Scotland)

16 November 2013
12:00 EET (UTC+02)

| (1 BP) Moldova | 30–15 | Germany |
| | Stats |

Dinamo Stadium, Chișinău
Referee: Eric Soulan (France)

16 November 2013
15:00 CET (UTC+01)

| (1 BP) Czech Republic | 10–17 | Ukraine |
| | Stats |

Stadion Mládeže, Zlín
Attendance: 600
Referee: Iñaki Atorrasagasti (Spain)

5 April 2014
15:00 CEST (UTC+02)

| (1 BP) Germany | 76–12 | Czech Republic |
| | Stats |

Fritz-Grunebaum-Sportpark, Heidelberg
Referee: Radu Petrescu (Romania)

5 April 2014
14:00 CEST (UTC+02)

| Poland | 12–21 | Moldova |
| | Stats |

Municipal Stadium, Siedlce
Referee: Alexey Bryzgalin (Russia)

12 April 2014
16:00 EEST (UTC+03)

| (1 BP) Moldova | 28–8 | Ukraine |
| | Stats |

Dinamo Stadium, Chișinău
Referee: Ken Lambrechts (Belgium)

26 April 2014
14:00 EEST (UTC+03)

| Ukraine | 29–28 | Poland (1 BP) |
| | Stats |

Yunist Stadium, Lviv
Referee: Maxime Chalon (France)

26 April 2014
14:00 CEST (UTC+02)

| (1 BP) Czech Republic | 37–19 | Moldova |
| | Stats |

CE Group Rugby Arena, Prague
Referee: Graeme Wells (Scotland)

26 April 2014
15:00 CEST (UTC+02)

| Sweden | 20–45 | Germany (1 BP) |
| | Stats |

Enköpings RK, Enköping
Referee: Iñigo Atorrasagasti (Spain)

=== Round 4 Final ===
The winner of Round 4A, Germany, defeated Netherlands, the winner of Round 3, for the right to advance to Round 6 Final.

10 May 2014
15:00 CEST (UTC+02)

| Netherlands | 7–17 | Germany |
| | Stats |

National Rugby Centre, Amsterdam
Referee: Claudio Blessano (Italy)

== Round 5: European Nations Cup Division 1A 2012–14 ==
The winner of Round 5, Georgia, qualified for the 2015 Rugby World Cup as Europe 1 and will join New Zealand, Argentina, Tonga and Namibia in Pool C. The runner-up, Romania, qualified as Europe 2, joining France, Ireland, Italy and Canada in Pool D. Third place, Russia, advanced to Round 6 to play the winner of Round 4 for the opportunity to qualify for the repechage. Fourth through sixth were eliminated from Rugby World Cup qualifying.

| Pos | Team | Pld | W | D | L | PF | PA | PD | BP | Pts | Qualification |
|---|---|---|---|---|---|---|---|---|---|---|---|
| 1 | Georgia | 10 | 9 | 1 | 0 | 286 | 106 | +180 | 3 | 41 | Qualified as Europe 1 |
| 2 | Romania | 10 | 8 | 1 | 1 | 242 | 106 | +136 | 4 | 38 | Qualified as Europe 2 |
| 3 | Russia | 10 | 6 | 0 | 4 | 219 | 249 | −30 | 4 | 28 | Advances to Round 6 |
| 4 | Spain | 10 | 2 | 2 | 6 | 159 | 243 | −84 | 3 | 15 | |
| 5 | Portugal | 10 | 2 | 1 | 7 | 145 | 222 | −77 | 2 | 12 | |
| 6 | Belgium | 10 | 0 | 1 | 9 | 134 | 259 | −125 | 4 | 6 | |

Rules for classification: Points were awarded to the teams as follows: Win - 4 points; Draw - 2 points; 4 or more tries - 1 point; Loss within 7 points - 1 point; Loss greater than 7 points - 0 points

Matches 2013

2 February 2013
14:00 MSKT (UTC+04)

| Russia | 13–9 | Spain (1 BP) |
| | Stats |

FGUP Yug-Sport, Sochi
Attendance: 400
Referee: David Wilkinson (Ireland)

2 February 2013
15:00 CET (UTC+01)

| (1 BP) Belgium | 13–17 | Georgia |
| | Stats |

Stade Roi Baudouin, Brussels
Referee: Matteo Liperini (Italy)

2 February 2013
15:30 WET (UTC+00)

| (1 BP) Portugal | 13–19 | Romania |
| | Stats |

Estádio Universitário de Lisboa, Lisbon
Attendance: 3,000
Referee: Neil Hennessy (Wales)

9 February 2013
15:00 GET (UTC+04)

| Georgia | 25–12 | Portugal |
| | Stats |

Mikheil Meskhi Stadium, Tbilisi
Referee: Gia Amirkhanashvili (Georgia)

9 February 2013
15:00 EET (UTC+02)

| Romania | 29–14 | Russia |
| | Stats |

Stadionul Arcul de Triumf, Bucharest
Attendance: 2,500
Referee: Luke Pearce (England)

9 February 2013
15:00 CET (UTC+01)

| Belgium | 21–21 | Spain |
| | Stats |

Stade Roi Baudouin, Brussels
Referee: Stephan Pomarede (France)

23 February 2013
15:00 MSKT (UTC+04)

| Russia | 9–23 | Georgia |
| | Stats |

FGUP Yug-Sport, Sochi
Referee: Laurent Cardona (France

23 February 2013
15:00 WET (UTC+00)

| Portugal | 18–12 | Belgium (1 BP) |
| | Stats |

Estádio Universitário de Lisboa, Lisbon
Attendance: 2,310
Referee: Vlad Iordăchescu (Romania)

23 February 2013
16:00 CET (UTC+01)

| Spain | 15–25 | Romania |
| | Stats | Cards: Mihai Macovei (yellow card) 41' |

Las Mestas, Gijón
Attendance: 3,000
Referee: Giuseppe Vivarini (Italy)

9 March 2013
15:00 GET (UTC+04)

| (1 BP) Georgia | 61–18 | Spain |
| | Stats |

Mikheil Meskhi Stadium, Tbilisi
Referee: Stuart Gaffikin (Ireland)

9 March 2013
15:00 CET (UTC+01)

| Belgium | 14–32 | Romania (1 BP) |
| | Stats |

Stade Roi Baudouin, Brussels
Attendance: 3,500
Referee: Andy Ireland (Scotland)

9 March 2013
15:00 WET (UTC+00)

| Portugal | 23–31 | Russia (1 BP) |
| | Stats |

Estádio Universitário de Lisboa, Lisbon
Referee: Jean Pierre Matheu (France)

16 March 2013
15:00 MSKT (UTC+04)

| (1 BP) Russia | 43–32 | Belgium (1 BP) |
| | Stats |

FGUP Yug-Sport, Sochi
Referee: Claudio Blessano (Italy)

16 March 2013
15:00 EET (UTC+02)

| Romania | 9–9 | Georgia |
| | Stats |

Stadionul Arcul de Triumf, Bucharest
Attendance: 4,000
Referee: Ian Davies (Wales)

16 March 2013
18:00 CET (UTC+01)

| Spain | 9–9 | Portugal |
| | Stats |

Estadio San Lazaro, Santiago de Compostela
Referee: Cedric Marchat (France)

Matches 2014

1 February 2014
14:00 EET (UTC+02)

| Romania | 24–0 | Portugal |
| | Stats |

Cluj Arena, Cluj
Referee: Sean Gallagher (Ireland)

1 February 2014
16:00 CET (UTC+01)

| (1 BP) Spain | 25–28 | Russia |
| | Stats |

Estadio Nacional Complutense, Madrid
Attendance: 3,000
Referee: Lloyd Linton (Scotland)

1 February 2014
15:00 GET (UTC+04)

| (1 BP) Georgia | 35–0 | Belgium |
| | Stats |

Avchala Stadium, Tbilisi
Referee: Vlad Iordăchescu (Romania)

8 February 2014
15:00 WET (UTC+00)

| Portugal | 9–34 | Georgia |
| | Stats |

Estádio Universitário de Lisboa, Lisbon
Referee: Cedric Marchat (France)

8 February 2014
14:00 MSKT (UTC+04)

| Russia | 3–34 | Romania (1 BP) |
| | Stats |

Gazprom Yamal Health Resort, Tuapse
Attendance: 250
Referee: David Wilkinson (Ireland)

8 February 2014
16:00 CET (UTC+01)

| Spain | 11–6 | Belgium (1 BP) |
| | Stats |

Estadio Nacional Complutense, Madrid
Attendance: 2,500
Referee: Marius Mitrea (Italy)

22 February 2014
14:30 EET (UTC+02)

| (1 BP) Romania | 32–6 | Spain |
| | Stats |

Cluj Arena, Cluj
Referee: James McPhail (Netherlands)

22 February 2014
17:00 GET (UTC+04)

| (1 BP) Georgia | 36–10 | Russia |
| | Stats |

Dinamo Arena, Tbilisi
Attendance: 54,827
Referee: Alexandre Ruiz (France)

22 February 2014
15:00 CET (UTC+01)

| Belgium | 6–19 | Portugal |
| | Stats |

Stade Roi Baudouin, Brussels
Referee: Neil Hennessy (Wales)

8 March 2014
16:00 CET (UTC+01)

| (1 BP) Spain | 17–24 | Georgia |
| | Stats |

Estadio Nacional Complutense, Madrid
Attendance: 6,000
Referee: Neil Hennessy (Wales)

8 March 2014
15:00 MSKT (UTC+04)

| (1 BP) Russia | 34–18 | Portugal |
| | Stats |

Sochi Central Stadium, Sochi
Attendance: 500
Referee: Matthew Carley (England)

8 March 2014
14:00 EET (UTC+02)

| (1 BP) Romania | 29–10 | Belgium |
| | Stats |

Stadionul Farul, Constanța
Attendance: 1,000
Referee: Claudio Blessano (Italy)

15 March 2014
17:00 WET (UTC+00)

| (1 BP) Portugal | 24–28 | Spain |
| | Stats |

Estádio Universitário de Lisboa, Lisbon
Referee: Laurent Cardona (France)

15 March 2014
18:00 CET (UTC+01)

| Belgium | 20–34 | Russia (1 BP) |
| | Stats |

King Baudouin Stadium, Brussels
Referee: Giuseppe Vivarini (Italy

15 March 2014
17:00 GET (UTC+04)

| Georgia | 22–9 | Romania |
| | Stats |

Mikheil Meskhi Stadium, Tbilisi
Attendance: 25,000
Referee: Luke Pearce (England)

== Round 6: Repechage playoff ==
The winning team from Round 4, Germany, advanced to play the third place team from Round 5, Russia. Russia won and advanced to the repechage.

24 May 2014
15:00 CEST (UTC+02)

| Germany | 20–31 | Russia |
| Try: Armstrong 46' c Vollenkemper 52' c Con: Hilsenbeck (2/2) 47', 53'; Pen: Hilsenbeck (2/5) 27', 56' | Stats | Try: Ostroushko (2) 10' m, 44' c Igretsov 19' m Kushnarev 76' c Matveyev 80' c Con: Kushnarev (3/5) 45', 77', 80' |

Wolfgang-Meyer-Sportanlage, Hamburg
Referee: Iñaki Atorrasagasti (Spain)

Team details

| FB | 15 | Steffen Liebig |
| RW | 14 | Mark Syntzdera |
| OC | 13 | Clemens von Grumbkow |
| IC | 12 | Anjo Buckman | | | (substituted off) 56' | (substituted on) 64' |
| LW | 11 | Marten Strauch |
| FH | 10 | Chris Hilsenbeck |
| SH | 9 | Sean Armstrong (c) |
| N8 | 8 | Timo Vollenkemper |
| OF | 7 | Alexander Hug |
| BF | 6 | Kehoma Brenner | | (substituted off) 60' |
| RL | 5 | Rob May |
| LL | 4 | Manuel Wilhelm | | (substituted off) 40' |
| TP | 3 | Samy Füchsel |
| HK | 2 | Mika Tyumenev | | (substituted off) 40' | (substituted on) 56' | (substituted off) 64' |
| LP | 1 | Arthur Zeiler | | (substituted off) 64' |
Replacements:
| PR | 16 | Marcus Bender |
| PR | 17 | Chris Howells | | (substituted on) 64' |
| HK | 18 | Alexander Widiker | (yellow card) 53' | (substituted on) 40' |
| N8 | 19 | Robert Mohr | | (substituted on) 40' |
| FL | 20 | Umberto Pilla | | (substituted on) 60' |
| CE | 21 | Carlos Soteras-Merz |
| SH | 22 | Tim Menzel |
| FB | 23 | Raphael Hackl |
Coach:
(South Africa) Kobus Potgieter

| FB | 15 | Igor Klyuchnikov |
| RW | 14 | Igor Galinovsky |
| OC | 13 | Dimitry Gerasimov |
| IC | 12 | Alexey Makovetsky |
| LW | 11 | Vladimir Ostroushko |
| FH | 10 | Yuri Kushnarev |
| SH | 9 | Alexander Yanyushkin |
| N8 | 8 | Andrey Temnov |
| OF | 7 | Andrey Garbuzov | | (substituted off) 58' |
| BF | 6 | Pavel Butenko |
| RL | 5 | Kirill Kulemin |
| LL | 4 | Andrey Voytov |
| TP | 3 | Andrey Igretsov | | (substituted off) 53' |
| HK | 2 | Valery Tsnobiladze | | (substituted off) 53' |
| LP | 1 | Gregory Tsnobiladze | (yellow card) 47' | (substituted off) 59' |
Replacements:
| HK | 16 | Yevgeny Matveyev | | (substituted on) 53' |
| PR | 17 | Aleksey Volkov | | (substituted on) 59' |
| PR | 18 | Innokenty Zykov | | (substituted on) 53' |
| FL | 19 | Viktor Gresev | | (substituted on) 58' |
| FL | 20 | Artem Fatakhov |
| CE | 21 | Mikhail Babaev |
| SH | 22 | Anton Ryabov |
| FH | 23 | Sergey Yanyushkin |
Coach:
(Wales) Kingsley Jones

Touch judges:
Igotz Gallastegi (Spain)
Jorge Molpeceres (Spain)

== See also ==
- 2012–14 European Nations Cup First Division
- 2012–14 European Nations Cup Second Division
