= Berishvili =

Berishvili (Georgian: ბერიშვილი) is a Georgian surname. Notable people with the surname include:

- Givi Berishvili (born 1987), Georgian rugby union player
- Mikheil Berishvili (born 1987), Georgian basketball player
