= Gugava =

Gugava is a Georgian surname. Notable people with the surname include:

- Georgi Gugava (born 1978), Georgian judoka
- Giorgi Gugava (born 1974), Georgian politician
- Lexo Gugava (born 1982), Georgian rugby union player
