= Rodrigo Capó Ortega =

Uruguay international rugby union player

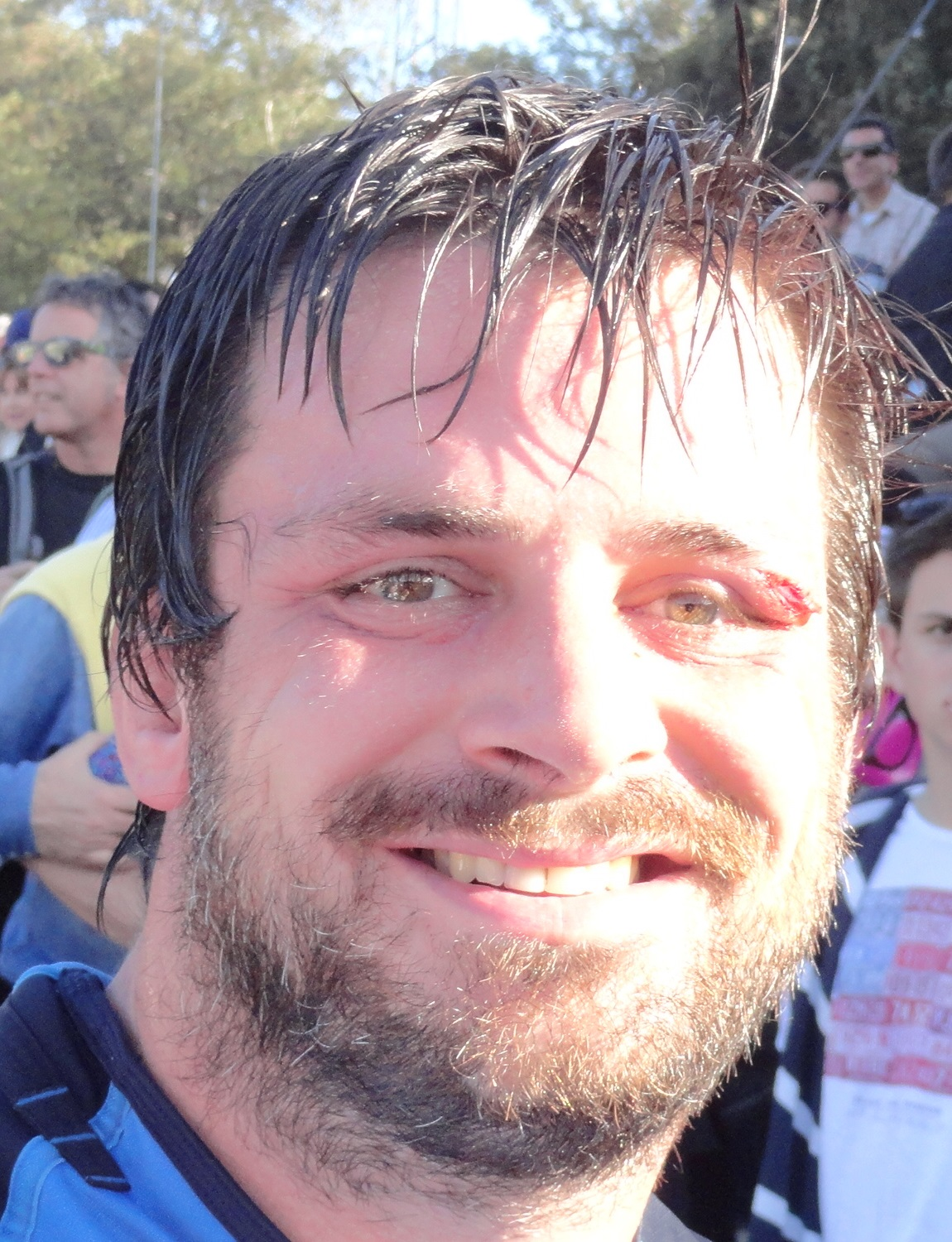
- Born: December 8, 1980 (age 45) Montevideo, Uruguay
- Height: 1.92 m (6 ft 4 in)
- Weight: 120 kg (265 lb)

Rugby union career
- Position(s): Lock, Flanker
- Current team: Castres Olympique
Amateur team(s)
Years	Team	Apps	(Points)
1999-2001	Carrasco Polo Club		
Senior career
Years	Team	Apps	(Points)
2002	Millau	0	(0)
2002–2020	Castres Olympique	403	(155)
International career
Years	Team	Apps	(Points)
2000–2019	Uruguay	41	(50)

Rodrigo Capó Ortega (born 8 December 1980) is a former Uruguayan rugby union player. He won the Top 14 in 2012–13 and 2017–18 with Castres

== Club rugby ==
Capó Ortega was born in Montevideo in Uruguay. He played for amateur side Carrasco Polo Club in Uruguay, earning three Campeonato Uruguayo de Rugby titles in 1999, 2000 and 2001. He would have earned a fourth title, but he signed for French side Castres Olympique in 2002 missing out on that season in Uruguay. To date he is the only Uruguayan player to have earned a professional trophy, haven been part of the Castres side that won the 2012–13 Top 14 season. Capó Ortega likes to drink mate before coming on the pitch.

== International rugby ==
He has 38 caps with 9 tries scored, 45 points on aggregate, for the Uruguayan national side. His first game was on 12 November 2000 against Chile in an 11–9 victory. He was part of the Uruguayan side that went to the 2003 Rugby World Cup in Australia, playing in all four games, which included a try against South Africa. He later returned to the Uruguayan national side in 2006 having been released by Castres to play in the final matches of the 2007 Rugby World Cup – Americas qualification process. However, having failed to qualify for any of the Americas berths, Uruguay faced Portugal in the repechage, in which Portugal won 24–23 on aggregate. He returned to the international scene in 2009 to help Uruguay try and qualify for the 2011 Rugby World Cup, and like in 2007, Uruguay failed to qualify, after failing to qualify through both the 2011 Rugby World Cup – Americas qualification and 2011 Rugby World Cup – repechage qualification. In 2009, he left the Teros due to issues between the Uruguayan Rugby Union and Castres. However, Capó Ortega returned at the 2015 Rugby World Cup repechage, where he helped Uruguay beat Russia 57–49 on aggregate to qualify for the 2015 Rugby World Cup, after a 12 years absence.

After the 11 October clash with Russia, on 25 June 2015, just 3 months out from the 2015 Rugby World Cup, he announced his retirement from international rugby, having played 38 times, 12 as captain, and scoring 45 points in his 15-year international career. He returned to the national team to play for the 2019 Rugby World Cup qualifying, aged 37 years old.

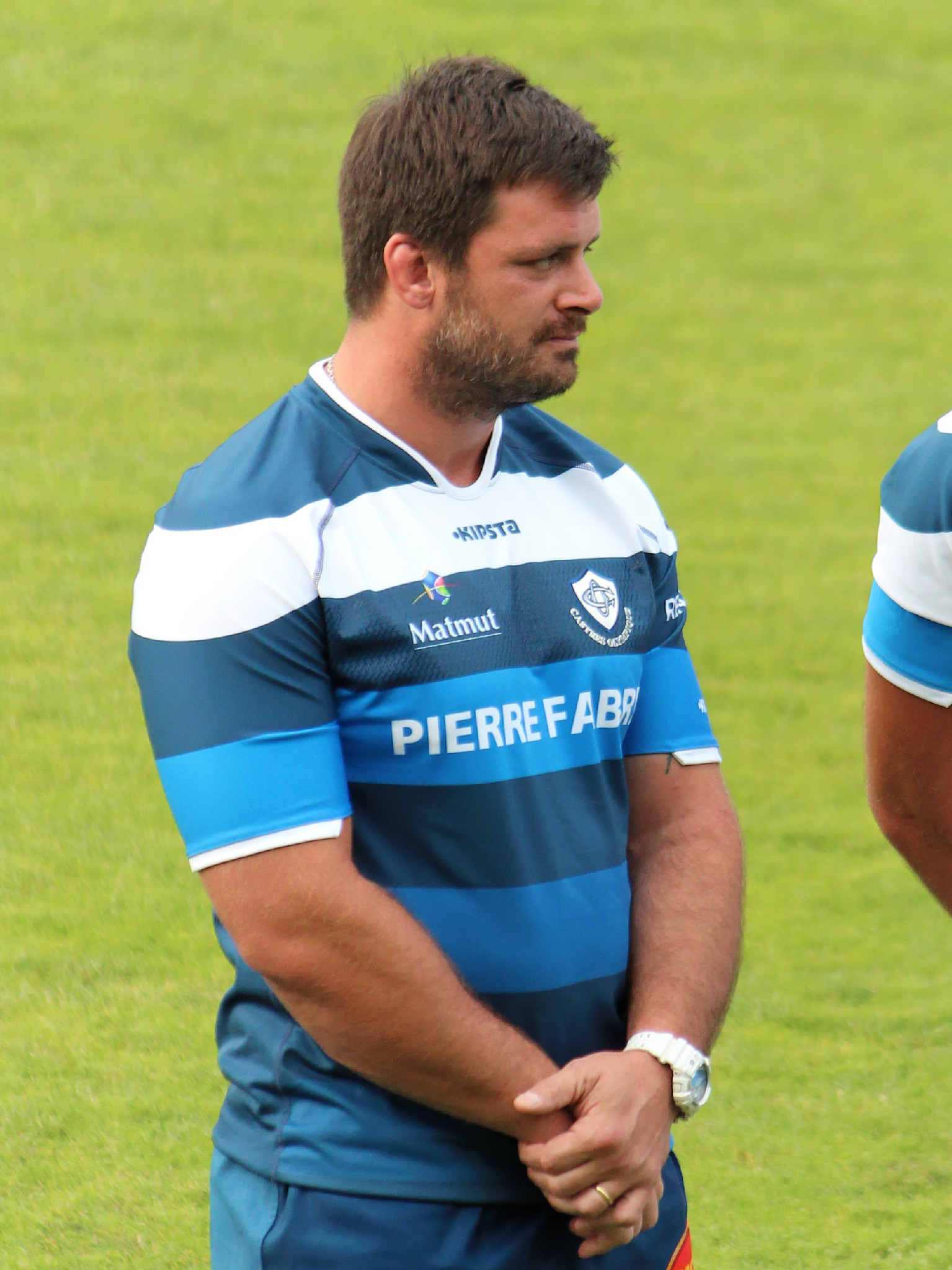
Rodrigo Capó Ortega at the presentation of Castres Olympique for the 2015/16 season.

== Honours ==
Carrasco Polo

- Uruguayan Championship (3): 1999, 2000, 2001

Castres

- Top 14 French League (2): 2012–13, 2017–18
