= Grigoriy Tsnobiladze =

- Born: Grigoriy Tsnobiladze; 2 January 1983 (age 43) Vorkuta, Komi ASSR, RSFSR, USSR
- Height: 177 cm (5 ft 10 in) 0
- Weight: 112 kg (247 lb; 17 st 9 lb)
- Notable relative: brother Valery Tsnobiladze

Rugby union career
- Position: Prop
- Current team: Krasny Yar
Senior career
Years	Team	Apps	(Points)
–2005	Aia Kutaisi		
2005–2011	Novokuznetsk		
2006	Castres Olympique		
2011–present	Krasny Yar		
International career
Years	Team	Apps	(Points)
2011–2014	Russia		
- Correct as of 5 October 2021

Grigoriy Tsnobiladze (Russian: Григорий Жиронович Цнобиладзе) is a Russian professional rugby union player who plays as a prop for Krasny Yar.

== Background ==
Grigoriy Tsnobiladze was born in a Russian city of Vorkuta to Georgian parents. Shortly after his birth the family moved to Georgia, where Grigoriy started playing rugby at the age of 13-14.

== Club career ==
He played for Aia Kutaisi until 2005. In 2005 he signed a contract with Novokuznetsk, where he played until 2011 save for a short 6-months spell at Castres Olympique in 2006. In 2011 he signed with Krasny Yar.

== International career ==
Grigoriy Tsnobiladze played 22 matches for Russia. His debut was in 2011 in a match v Italy A.

== Personal life ==
Grigoriy's older brother Valery also played rugby. Grigoriy Tsnobiladze is married and has two sons.
