= 2015 Rugby World Cup – Asia qualification =

In the Asian Region for 2015 Rugby World Cup qualifying, Japan took the sole qualification spot, Asia 1 by winning Round 3: 2014 Asian Five Nations, while second placed Hong Kong qualified for the repechage playoff.

The qualification process included the top four levels of the Asian Five Nations tournaments, beginning in 2012.

== Format ==
Asia provided one direct qualifier for the 2015 Rugby World Cup (Asia 1), and one repechage play-off position. The Asian qualification process used the Asian Five Nations, using the top three divisions in the second tier of Asian teams, and the top-tier competition Asian Five Nations.

The 2012 Asian Five Nations Divisions 1 through Division 3 were the first stage of qualifying. The winners of Divisions 2 and 3, Thailand and India, faced each other for the right to be promoted to Division 1 in 2013, Thailand winning. The last place team in Division 1, Singapore, was relegated to Division 2. As only teams in the top tier Asian Five Nations and Division 1 in 2013 could qualify for the top tier in 2014, all the remaining teams were therefore eliminated.

The second phase included the top tier of the 2013 Asian Five Nations, as well as Division 1. The winner of Division 1, Sri Lanka, earned promotion to the top tier for 2014, which served as the qualification final. United Arab Emirates finished in last place in the top tier, thus earning them relegation and elimination from the qualification process.

The final phase was the top tier of the 2014 Asian Five Nations. Japan won, thus qualifying for Pool B of the 2015 Rugby World Cup, along with Samoa, Scotland, South Africa, and USA. Hong Kong finished in second place to qualify for the repechage playoff against Uruguay.

== Entrants ==
The 2015 Rugby World Cup qualifying teams that competed for the 2015 Rugby World Cup – Asia qualification. (World rankings, shown in brackets, are those immediately prior to first Asia qualification match on 30 May 2012)

- China (62)
- Chinese Taipei (58)
- Guam (88)
- Hong Kong (28)
- India (77)
- Indonesia (NR)
- Iran (NR)
- Japan (14)
- Kazakhstan (36)
- Malaysia (63)
- Pakistan (73)
- Philippines (55)
- Singapore (67)
- South Korea (26)
- Sri Lanka (46)
- Thailand (65)
- United Arab Emirates (NR)

=== Qualified nations ===
- Japan

== 2012 ==
=== 2012 Asian Five Nations Division 3 ===
The winner, India, advanced to the Division 2/3 playoff match against Thailand for the right to compete in 2013 Asian Five Nations Division 1.

Semi-finals
May 30, 2012
Guam	38
Indonesia	17
May 30, 2012
India	34
Pakistan	5

Final
June 1, 2012
Guam	16
India	18
Third place play-off
June 1, 2012
Indonesia	13
Pakistan	7

Matches

30 May 2012
14:30 WIB (UTC+07)

Guam	38–17	Indonesia
	Stats

Haji Agus Salim Stadium, Padang, Indonesia
Referee: Nik Ramadhan (Malaysia)

30 May 2012
16:30 WIB (UTC+07)

India	34–5	Pakistan
	Stats

Haji Agus Salim Stadium, Padang, Indonesia
Referee: Kim Yong Hoe (Korea)

1 June 2012
14:30 WIB (UTC+07)

Indonesia	13–7	Pakistan
	Stats

Haji Agus Salim Stadium, Padang, Indonesia
Referee: Thawatchai Somwang (Thailand)

1 June 2012
16:30 WIB (UTC+07)

Guam	16–18	India
	Stats

Haji Agus Salim Stadium, Padang, Indonesia
Referee: Raimee Mansur (Malaysia)

=== 2012 Asian Five Nations Division 2 ===
The winners, Thailand, advanced to the Division 2/3 playoff match against India for the right to compete in 2013 Asian Five Nations Division 1.

Semi-finals
May 31, 2012
Thailand	37
Iran	17
May 31, 2012
Malaysia	89
China	0

Final
June 2, 2012
Thailand	22
Malaysia	19
Third place play-off
June 2, 2012
Iran	52
China	3

Matches

31 May 2012
14:30 MST (UTC+08)

Thailand	37–17	Iran
	Stats

Royal Selangor Club, Kuala Lumpur, Malaysia
Referee: Aaron Littlewood (Singapore)

31 May 2012
16:30 MST (UTC+08)

Malaysia	89–0	China
	Stats

Royal Selangor Club, Kuala Lumpur, Malaysia
Referee: Nicholas Long (Hong Kong)

2 June 2012
14:30 MST (UTC+08)

China	3–52	Iran
	Stats

Royal Selangor Club, Kuala Lumpur, Malaysia
Referee: Nik Ramadhan (Malaysia)

2 June 2012
16:30 MST (UTC+08)

Malaysia	19–22	Thailand
	Stats

Royal Selangor Club, Kuala Lumpur, Malaysia
Referee: Nicholas Long (Hong Kong)

=== Division 2/3 Promotion ===
Thailand defeated India for promotion to the 2013 Asian Five Nations Division 1 and to remain in contention for Rugby World Cup qualifying. Thailand therefore advanced in and India was eliminated from the Rugby World Cup Qualification process.

14 July 2012
16:00 TST (UTC+07)

Thailand	42–29	India
	Stats

Thephasadin Stadium, Thephasadin Stadium
Referee: Takashi Harada (Japan)

=== 2012 Asian Five Nations Division 1 ===
The top three teams remained in 2015 Rugby World Cup qualifying, with Philippines advancing to the 2013 Asian Five Nations, and Sri Lanka and Chinese Taipei advancing to the 2013 Asian Five Nations Division 1. The last placed team, Singapore, was eliminated from 2015 Rugby World Cup qualifying.

All the games were played in Manila, Philippines at the Rizal Memorial Stadium.

Advances to Round 2

Position	Nation	Games				Points			Bonus points	Total points
Position	Nation	Played	Won	Drawn	Lost	For	Against	Difference	Bonus points	Total points
1	Philippines	3	3	0	0	99	50	+49	3	18
2	Sri Lanka	3	2	0	1	89	46	+43	2	12
3	Chinese Taipei	3	1	0	2	69	101	-32	1	6
4	Singapore	3	0	0	3	61	121	-60	1	1
Points were awarded to the teams as follows: Win - 5 points Draw - 3 points 4 or more tries - 1 point Loss within 7 points - 1 point Loss greater than 7 points - 0 points

Matches

15 April 2012
17:00 PST (UTC+08)

(1 BP) Sri Lanka	36–8	Chinese Taipei
	Stats

Rizal Memorial Stadium, Manila, Philippines
Referee: Warren Needham (Hong Kong)

15 April 2012
19:00 PST (UTC+08)

Singapore	20–37	Philippines (1 BP)
	Stats

Rizal Memorial Stadium, Manila, Philippines
Referee: Dharmapalage Nimal (Sri Lanka)

18 April 2012
17:00 PST (UTC+08)

(1 BP) Sri Lanka	35–10	Singapore
	Stats

Rizal Memorial Stadium, Manila, Philippines
Referee: Dewi Rowlands (Hong Kong)

18 April 2012
19:00 PST (UTC+08)

(1 BP) Philippines	34–12	Chinese Taipei
	Stats

Rizal Memorial Stadium, Manila, Philippines
Referee: Paul Mackay (Singapore)

21 April 2012
17:00 PST (UTC+08)

Sri Lanka	18–28	Philippines (1 BP)
	Stats

Rizal Memorial Stadium, Manila, Philippines
Referee: Taizo Hirabayashi (Japan)

21 April 2012
19:00 PST (UTC+08)

(1 BP) Singapore	31–49	Chinese Taipei (1 BP)
	Stats

Rizal Memorial Stadium, Manila, Philippines
Referee: Kyosuke Toda (Japan)

== 2013 ==
=== 2013 Asian Five Nations Division 1 ===
The tournament was played in Sri Lanka from 31 March to 6 April 2013. The winner of this division and this stage of qualification, Sri Lanka, earned promotion to the main division for 2014, which will be the final stage of Asian Rugby World Cup qualifying. The remaining three teams were eliminated from World Cup qualifying.

Advances to Round 3

Position	Nation	Games				Points			Bonus points	Total points
Position	Nation	Played	Won	Drawn	Lost	For	Against	Difference	Bonus points	Total points
1	Sri Lanka	3	3	0	0	133	33	+100	3	18
2	Kazakhstan	3	1	0	2	70	92	-22	1	6
3	Chinese Taipei	3	1	0	2	70	104	–34	1	6
4	Thailand	3	1	0	2	63	107	–44	0	5
Points were awarded to the teams as follows: Win - 5 points Draw - 3 points 4 or more tries - 1 point Loss within 7 points - 1 point Loss greater than 7 points - 0 points

Matches

31 March 2013
14:00 SLST (UTC+05)

Kazakhstan	10–33	Thailand
	Stats

Havelock Sports Club, Sri Lanka
Referee: Warren Needham (Hong Kong)

31 March 2013
16:00 SLST (UTC+05)

(1 BP) Sri Lanka	39–8	Chinese Taipei
	Stats

Havelock Sports Club, Sri Lanka
Referee: Nicholas Long (Hong Kong)

3 April 2013
14:00 SLST (UTC+05)

(1 BP) Kazakhstan	42–10	Chinese Taipei
	Stats

Havelock Sports Club, Sri Lanka
Referee: Nicholas Long (Hong Kong)

3 April 2013
16:00 SLST (UTC+05)

(1 BP) Sri Lanka	45–7	Thailand
	Stats

Havelock Sports Club, Sri Lanka
Referee: Warren Needham (Hong Kong)

6 April 2013
14:00 SLST (UTC+05)

(1 BP) Chinese Taipei	52–23	Thailand
	Stats

Havelock Sports Club, Sri Lanka
Referee: Dewi Rowlands (Hong Kong)

6 April 2013
16:00 SLST (UTC+05)

(1 BP) Sri Lanka	49–18	Kazakhstan
	Stats

Havelock Sports Club, Sri Lanka
Referee: Taku Otsuki (Japan)

=== 2013 Asian Five Nations ===
The top four teams advanced to the final stage of Rugby World Cup qualifying, while the last placed team, United Arab Emirates, was relegated to Division 1 and eliminated from qualifying for the Rugby World Cup.

Advances to Round 3

Position	Nation	Games				Points			Bonus points	Total points
Position	Nation	Played	Won	Drawn	Lost	For	Against	Difference	Bonus points	Total points
1	Japan	4	4	0	0	316	8	+308	4	24
2	South Korea	4	3	0	1	185	115	+70	3	18
3	Hong Kong	4	2	0	2	134	108	+26	2	12
4	Philippines	4	1	0	3	63	250	–187	1	6
5	United Arab Emirates	4	0	0	4	28	245	–217	0	0
Points were awarded to the teams as follows: Win - 5 points Draw - 3 points 4 or more tries - 1 point Loss within 7 points - 1 point Loss greater than 7 points - 0 points

Matches

20 April 2013
14:00 JST (UTC+09)

(1 BP) Japan	121–0	Philippines
	Stats

Level-5 Stadium, Fukuoka
Referee: Dewi Rowlands (Hong Kong)

20 April 2013
16:00 KHT (UTC+08)

(1 BP) Hong Kong	53–7	United Arab Emirates
	Stats

Hong Kong Football Club Stadium, Hong Kong
Referee: Taizo Hirabayashi (Japan)

26 April 2013
17:00 UAET (UTC+04)

United Arab Emirates	10–75	South Korea (1 BP)
	Stats

Al Ain RFC, Al Ain
Referee: Tobi Lothian (Hong Kong)

27 April 2013
16:00 KHT (UTC+08)

Hong Kong	0–38	Japan (1 BP)
	Stats

Hong Kong Football Club Stadium, Hong Kong
Referee: Aaron Littlewood (Singapore)

4 May 2013
14:00 JST (UTC+09)

(1 BP) Japan	64–5	South Korea
	Stats

Chichibunomiya Rugby Stadium, Tokyo
Referee: Tobi Lothian (Hong Kong)

4 May 2013
19:00 PST (UTC+08)

Philippines	20–59	Hong Kong (1 BP)
	Stats

Rizal Memorial Stadium, Manila
Referee: Taku Otsuki (Japan)

10 May 2013
20:00 UAET (UTC+04)

United Arab Emirates	3–93	Japan (1 BP)
	Stats

Sevens, Dubai
Referee: Dewi Rowlands (Hong Kong)

11 May 2013
12:00 KST (UTC+09)

(1 BP) South Korea	62–19	Philippines
	Stats

Ansan Wa~ Stadium, Ansan
Referee: Taku Otsuki (Japan)

18 May 2013
12:00 KST (UTC+09)

(1 BP) South Korea	43–22	Hong Kong
	Stats

Ansan Wa~ Stadium, Ansan
Referee: Taizo Hirabayashi (Japan)

18 May 2013
19:00

(1 BP) Philippines	24–8	United Arab Emirates
	Stats

Rizal Memorial Stadium, Manila
Referee: Taku Otsuki (Japan)

== 2014 Asian Five Nations ==
The winner the 2014 Asian Five Nations tournament, Japan, qualified for the 2015 Rugby World Cup as Asia 1 in Pool B. The runner-up in the tournament, Hong Kong, advanced to the repechage playoffs to play Uruguay.

Qualified for 2015 Rugby World Cup
Qualified for Repechage

Position	Nation	Games				Points			Bonus points	Total points
Position	Nation	Played	Won	Drawn	Lost	For	Against	Difference	Bonus points	Total points
1	Japan	4	4	0	0	342	33	+309	4	24
2	Hong Kong	4	3	0	1	196	65	+131	3	18
3	South Korea	4	2	0	2	122	126	-4	2	12
4	Philippines	4	1	0	3	58	284	–226	1	6
5	Sri Lanka	4	0	0	4	48	258	–210	1	1
Points were awarded to the teams as follows: Win - 5 points Draw - 3 points 4 or more tries - 1 point Loss within 7 points - 1 point Loss greater than 7 points - 0 points

Matches

26 April 2014
12:00 KST (UTC+09)

(1 BP) South Korea	59–3	Sri Lanka
	Stats

Incheon Munhak Stadium, Incheon
Referee: Taku Otsuki (Japan)

26 April 2014
18:00 HKT (UTC+08)

(1 BP) Hong Kong	108–0	Philippines
	Stats

Hong Kong Football Club Stadium, Hong Kong
Referee: Shuhei Kubo (Japan)

3 May 2014
15:30 PST (UTC+08)

Philippines	10–99	Japan (1 BP)
	Stats

Eagles Nest Stadium, Laguna
Referee: Dewi Rowlands (Hong Kong)

3 May 2014
18:30 SLT (UTC+05:30)

Sri Lanka	10–41	Hong Kong (1 BP)
	Stats

Colombo Racecourse, Colombo
Referee: Azhar Mohammad Bin Yus (Singapore)

10 May 2014
18:00 JST (UTC+09)

(1 BP) Japan	132–10	Sri Lanka
	Stats

Mizuho Rugby Stadium, Nagoya
Referee: Aaron Littlewood (Singapore)

10 May 2014
18:00 HKT (UTC+08)

(1 BP) Hong Kong	39–6	South Korea
	Stats

Hong Kong Football Club Stadium, Hong Kong
Referee: Taku Otsuki (Japan)

17 May 2014
12:00 KST (UTC+09)

South Korea	5–62	Japan (1 BP)
	Stats

Incheon Munhak Stadium, Incheon
Referee: Tobi Lothian (Hong Kong)

17 May 2014
18:30 SLT (UTC+05:30)

(1 BP) Sri Lanka	25–26	Philippines (1 BP)
	Stats

Colombo Racecourse, Colombo
Referee: Shuhei Kubo (Japan)

24 May 2014
15:30 PST (UTC+08)

Philippines	22–52	South Korea (1 BP)
	Stats

Eagles Nest Stadium, Laguna
Referee: Taizo Hirabayashi (Japan)

25 May 2014
17:00 JST (UTC+09)

(1 BP) Japan	49–8	Hong Kong
	Stats

National Olympic Stadium, Tokyo
Referee: Azhar Mohammad Bin Yus (Singapore)
