= Lambert Groenewald =

- Full name: Lambert Smith Groenewald
- Born: 1 February 1989 (age 37) Worcester, South Africa
- Height: 1.89 m (6 ft 2 1/2 in)
- Weight: 113 kg (17 st 11 lb; 249 lb)
- School: Paul Roos Gymnasium

Rugby union career
- Position: Flanker
Youth career
- 2007: Western Province
- 2008–2010: Sharks
Senior career
Years	Team	Apps	(Points)
2010–2011	Sharks XV	14	(5)
2011	Sharks	1	(0)
2011–2012	Brescia		
2012–2013	AMPO Ordizia		
2013	Golden Lions	6	(0)
2014	Golden Lions XV	1	(0)
2015–2017	Pumas	37	(45)
- Correct as of 18 May 2018

Lambert Smith Groenewald (born 1 February 1989 in Worcester) is a South African-born Zimbabwean rugby union player who most recently played for the Pumas. His regular position is flanker.

== Career ==
=== Youth ===
At youth level, he captained his high school team at Paul Roos Gymnasium and represented Western Province at the 2007 Under-18 Academy Week and Craven Week tournaments before moving to the Sharks. He represented them at Under-19 and Under-21 level between 2008 and 2010.

=== Sharks ===
He made his first class debut for the Sharks XV in the 2010 Vodacom Cup competition. He started the opening match of the season against the Border Bulldogs and scored a try after 29 minutes to help the Sharks XV to a 69–8 victory. A further five appearances followed in the 2010 Vodacom Cup, as well as eight appearances in the 2011 competition.

He did not play any Currie Cup rugby, but he did make one Super Rugby appearance for the Sharks when he came on as a late substitute for Ryan Kankowski in their match against the Blues.

=== Brescia and Ordizia ===
He left the Sharks in 2011 to join Rugby Brescia in the Italian Serie A. He spent one season in Brescia and then joined Basque side AMPO Ordizia for the 2012–13 División de Honor de Rugby.

=== Golden Lions ===
He returned to South Africa in 2013, joining the Golden Lions in time for the 2013 Currie Cup Premier Division season.

=== Pumas ===
After making just seven appearances in two years for the Golden Lions, he agreed to join Mbombela-based side the Pumas on loan for the 2015 season. He was a member of the Pumas side that won the Vodacom Cup for the first time in 2015, beating Western Province 24–7 in the final. Groenewald made eight appearances during the season, scoring two tries.

In July 2015, the Pumas announced that they signed Groenewald on a permanent basis for the 2016 season.

=== Zimbabwe ===
In May 2014, the ZRU confirmed that Groenewald would be available to play for the Zimbabwe during the 2014 Africa Cup, a competition that doubled up as the African qualifying competition for the 2015 Rugby World Cup.
