= Lawrence Cleminson =

- Born: 30 June 1992 (age 34) Bulawayo, Zimbabwe
- Height: 186 cm (6 ft 1 in)
- Weight: 120 kg (265 lb; 18 st 13 lb)

Rugby union career
- Position: Prop
Amateur team(s)
Years	Team	Apps	(Points)
–	Naka Bulls		
–	Old Georgians		
Senior career
Years	Team	Apps	(Points)
2015	Yenisey-STM	1	
- Correct as of 9 November 2021
International career
Years	Team	Apps	(Points)
- Zimbabwe

Lawrence Cleminson (born 30 June 1992) is a Zimbabwean rugby union player who plays at prop.

He was born in Bulawayo where he played U13 rugby for Matabeleland Duikers.

In 2015 he was invited by Yenisey-STM to play for the club during its 2015-16 European Rugby Challenge Cup campaign and played in the away match v Newcastle Falcons, however he could not play more matches in that tournament because of visa issues.

He played more than 20 matches for the Zimbabwe national team.
