= 2015 Rugby World Cup qualifying =

Tournament details
- Dates: 2011 – 2014
- No. of nations: 84

The qualification process for the 2015 Rugby World Cup began during the pool stages of the 2011 tournament in New Zealand, during which the top three teams from each of the four pools were awarded automatic qualification for the 2015 event. A further eight teams qualified through regional tournaments and the repechage process. The tournament was held in England; it began on 18 September 2015 and finished on 31 October.

== Qualifiers ==
	Africa	Americas	Asia	Europe	Oceania
Qualified at 2011 RWC	South Africa	Argentina		England (hosts); France; Ireland; Italy; Scotland; Wales	Australia; New Zealand (holders); Samoa; Tonga
Qualified via Regional Slots	Namibia (Africa 1)	Canada (Americas 1); United States (Americas 2)	Japan (Asia 1)	Georgia (Europe 1); Romania (Europe 2)	Fiji (Oceania 1)
Qualified via Repechage		Uruguay			

== Qualification process ==
Qualification started in the pool stage of RWC 2011. 12 teams received an automatic qualification berth by finishing in the top 3 positions of their respective pools.

A further 8 berths for the tournament were then available through regional tournaments and the repechage process.

The non-automatic qualification process began on 24 March 2012, by the end of which 80 teams had competed over 184 matches.

The pool draw for the 2015 Rugby World Cup took place on 3 December 2012. As with the 2011 tournament, the top 12 teams were grouped into 3 bands for the pool draw as per their IRB Rankings on that date, while the other 8 qualifying teams were split into a fourth and fifth band. One team from each band was drawn into each pool.

== Regional qualification ==
Seven of the final eight places were assigned to different regions by the IRB; the last place was decided by a repechage series.

Regional Qualification began on 24 March 2012, when Mexico hosted and defeated Jamaica in Mexico City. The match was refereed by Craig Joubert, who refereed the 2011 Rugby World Cup final.

In all, 96 national teams have been involved in the 2015 World Cup - 12 as automatic qualifiers and 84 as entrants in the qualification rounds.

Region	Automatic qualifiers	Teams in qualifying process	Qualifying places	Qualifying teams	World Cup pools	Repechage places	Repechage teams
Africa (CAR)	1	13*	1	Namibia	C	1	Zimbabwe
Americas (NACRA/CONSUR)	1	18	2	Canada; United States	D B	1	Uruguay
Asia (ARFU)	0	17	1	Japan	B	1	Hong Kong
Europe (FIRA–AER)†	6	31	2	Georgia; Romania	C D	1	Russia
Oceania (FORU)	4	5	1	Fiji	A	0	none
TOTALS	12	84	7			4	(1 WC Place)

*One additional team, Cameroon, withdrew prior to playing any games.
†During the qualification cycle, FIRA–AER changed its name to Rugby Europe.

=== Repechage qualification ===
Following the end of the regional qualification process, four teams (one from each region, except Oceania) took part in the repechage process for the final spot at the Rugby World Cup. The final was played over a two-match home and away basis. The team with the higher aggregate score, Uruguay, became the 20th and final team at the 2015 Rugby World Cup.

Semi-final
Russia	23
Zimbabwe	15
Uruguay	28
Hong Kong	3

Final
Russia	22	27	49
Uruguay	21	36	57
