= Niall Rowark =

Hong Kong Rugby Union player

Niall Rowark is a Hong Kong Rugby Union player. He plays for the Hong Kong Football Club and the Hong Kong National Team at the Fly-half position.

== Career ==
Rowark represented Hong Kong A in 2008 in a test series against Claremont College from USA. He featured in the 2015 Asian Rugby Championship.
