= 2015 Rugby World Cup – Africa qualification =

International rugby union competition Africa

Tournament details
- Dates: 4 July 2012 – 6 July 2014
- No. of nations: 13

The Africa section of 2015 Rugby World Cup qualifying saw thirteen teams competing for one direct qualification spot into the final tournament in England, and one spot in the Repechage play-offs.

== Format ==
The Africa Cup, run by the Confederation of African Rugby (CAR), was the regional qualification tournament for Rugby World Cup 2015, with Divisions 1A, 1B and 1C involved in the process. The 2012 Divisions 1B and 1C acted as the qualification matches in Round 1, with the Division 1C winner being promoted to Division 1B for the second round in 2013, while the bottom placed team in Division 1B was relegated to 1C and eliminated from Rugby World Cup contention. 2013 saw Divisions 1A and 1B act as the qualification matches in Round 2. The top three teams of Division 1A remained in that same division for the final round in 2014, to be joined by the winner of Division 1B in 2013. The teams that did not win Division 1B or were relegated out of 1A were eliminated from Rugby World Cup qualification. Namibia, the winner of Round 3, or Division 1A, in 2014 qualified for the 2015 Rugby World Cup as Africa 1, while the runner-up, Zimbabwe, entered the Repechage for a second chance to qualify.

== Entrants ==
Thirteen teams competed for the 2015 Rugby World Cup – Africa qualification. Shown in parentheses are the teams' world rankings prior to the first African qualification match on 4 July 2012.

- Botswana (81)
- Ivory Coast (47)
- Kenya (40)
- Madagascar (56)
- Mauritius (NR)
- Morocco (27)
- Nigeria (91)
- Namibia (21)
- Senegal (52)
- Tunisia (34)
- Uganda (43)
- Zambia (74)
- Zimbabwe (32)

=== Qualified nations ===
- South Africa (Automatic qualifier)
- Namibia (Africa 1)

== Round 1 ==
The first round consisted of nine matches between nine teams. The winner of the Africa Cup Division 1C (Round 1B), advanced to the second round and was promoted to Division 1B for 2013, while the top three teams in CAR Division 1B (Round 1A), also advanced into the second round.

=== Round 1A: 2012 Africa Cup Division 1B ===
The 2012 Africa Cup Division 1B took place in Madagascar at Mahamasina Stadium in Antananarivo on 4 July and 8 July. The champion, Madagascar, was promoted up to Division 1A thus advancing to Round 2B. Namibia and Senegal remained in Division 1B for 2013, advancing to Round 2A. Morocco was eliminated from Rugby World Cup, by virtue of being relegated to Division 1C for 2013.

Semi-finals
July 4, 2012 – Antananarivo
Madagascar	35
Morocco	28
July 4, 2012 – Antananarivo
Namibia	20
Senegal	18

Final
July 8, 2012 – Antananarivo
Madagascar	57
Namibia	54
Third place play-off
July 8, 2012 – Antananarivo
Morocco	25
Senegal	26

Matches

4 July 2012
13:00 EAT (UTC-03)

Madagascar	35–28	Morocco
	Stats

Stade Mahamasina, Antananarivo, Madagascar
Attendance: 35,000
Referee: Pro Legoete (South Africa)

4 July 2012
15:00 EAT (UTC-03)

Namibia	20–18	Senegal
	Stats

Stade Mahamasina, Antananarivo, Madagascar
Attendance: 35,000
Referee: Mark Lawrence (South Africa)

8 July 2012
13:00 EAT (UTC-03)

Morocco	25–26	Senegal
	Stats

Stade Mahamasina, Antananarivo, Madagascar
Attendance: 40,000
Referee: Pro Legoete (South Africa)

8 July 2012
15:00 EAT (UTC-03)

Madagascar	57–54 (a.e.t.)	Namibia
	Stats

Stade Mahamasina, Antananarivo, Madagascar
Attendance: 40,000
Referee: Mark Lawrence (South Africa)

=== Round 1B: 2012 Africa Cup Division 1C ===
The 2012 Africa Cup Division 1C took place in Botswana at UB Stadium in Gaborone from 22 July to 28 July. The champions, Botswana, were promoted up to Division 1B for 2013, thus advancing to Round 2A. Ivory Coast, Mauritius, Zambia and Nigeria were eliminated from Rugby World Cup qualifying.

Advances to Round 2A

Place	Nation	Games				Points			Bonus points	Table points
Place	Nation	played	won	drawn	lost	for	against	difference	Bonus points	Table points
1	Botswana	2	2	0	0	48	29	+19	0	8
2	Ivory Coast	2	2	0	0	53	35	+18	0	8
3	Mauritius	2	1	0	1	40	47	−7	0	4
4	Zambia	2	0	0	2	33	47	−14	0	0
5	Nigeria	2	0	0	2	39	55	−16	0	0
Points were awarded to the teams as follows: Win - 4 points Draw - 2 points 4 or more tries - 1 point Loss within 7 points - 1 point Loss greater than 7 points - 0 points

Matches

22 July 2012
14:00 CAT (UTC+02)

Mauritius	26–22	Nigeria
	Stats

UB Stadium, Gaborone, Botswana
Referee: Denis Anguyo (Uganada)

22 July 2012
16:00 CAT (UTC+02)

Botswana	23–15	Zambia
	Stats

UB Stadium, Gaborone, Botswana
Referee: Gabriel Masenda (Zimbabwe)

25 July 2012
16:00 CAT (UTC+02)

Ivory Coast	29–17	Nigeria
	Stats

UB Stadium, Gaborone, Botswana
Referee: Emmanuel Masinki (Botswana)

28 July 2012
14:00 CAT (UTC+02)

Ivory Coast	24–18	Zambia
	Stats

UB Stadium, Gaborone, Botswana
Referee: Emmanuel Massinki (Botswana)

28 July 2012
16:00 CAT (UTC+02)

Botswana	25–14	Mauritius
	Stats

UB Stadium, Gaborone, Botswana
Referee: Andrew Karani (Kenya)

== Round 2 ==
The second round consisted of eight matches featuring the top eight teams in Africa outside of South Africa. The top three teams of CAR Division 1A advanced to the third round, while the winner of CAR Division 1B was promoted to Division 1A thus advancing to the third round.

=== Round 2A: 2013 Africa Cup Division 1B ===
The 2013 Africa Cup Division 1B took place in Senegal at Stade Iba Mar Diop in Dakar on 11 June and 15 June. The champions, Namibia, were promoted to Division 1A to Round 3, while Botswana, Senegal and Tunisia were eliminated from Rugby World Cup qualifying.

Semi-finals
June 11, 2013 – Dakar
Tunisia	43
Botswana	12
June 11, 2013 – Dakar
Senegal	12
Namibia	35

Final
June 15, 2013 – Dakar
Tunisia	13
Namibia	45
Third place
June 15, 2013 – Dakar
Botswana	5
Senegal	41

Matches

11 June 2013
14:30 WET (UTC+00)

Botswana	12–43	Tunisia
	Stats

Iba Mar Diop, Dakar, Senegal
Referee: Arnaud Blondel (France)

11 June 2013
16:30 WET (UTC+00)

Senegal	12–35	Namibia
	Stats

Iba Mar Diop, Dakar, Senegal
Referee: Sébastien Minery (France)

15 June 2013
14:30 WET (UTC+00)

Senegal	41–5	Botswana
	Stats

Iba Mar Diop, Dakar, Senegal
Referee: Arnaud Blondel (France)

15 June 2013
16:30 WET (UTC+00)

Namibia	45–13	Tunisia
	Stats

Iba Mar Diop, Dakar, Senegal
Referee: Sébastien Minery (France)

=== Round 2B: 2013 Africa Cup Division 1A ===
The 2013 Africa Cup Division 1A took place in Madagascar at Mahamasina Stadium in Antananarivo on 10 July and 14 July. The top three teams, Kenya, Zimbabwe and Madagascar, remained in Division 1A for 2014, thus advancing to Round 3, while Uganda were eliminated from Rugby World Cup Qualifying.

Semi-finals
July 10, 2013 – Antananarivo
Uganda	11
Kenya	51
July 10, 2013 – Antananarivo
Zimbabwe	38
Madagascar	18

Final
July 14, 2013 – Antananarivo
Kenya	29
Zimbabwe	17
Third place
July 14, 2013 – Antananarivo
Uganda	32
Madagascar	48

Matches

10 July 2013
12:30 EAT (UTC+03)

Kenya	51–11	Uganda
	Stats

Stade Mahamasina, Antananarivo, Madagascar
Attendance: 40,000
Referee: Pro Legoete (South Africa)

10 July 2013
14:30 EAT (UTC+03)

Madagascar	18–38	Zimbabwe
	Stats

Stade Mahamasina, Antananarivo, Madagascar
Attendance: 40,000
Referee: Lourens van der Merwe (South Africa)

14 July 2013
12:30 EAT (UTC+03)

Uganda	32–48	Madagascar
	Stats

Stade Mahamasina, Antananarivo, Madagascar
Attendance: 40,000
Referee: Pro Legoete (South Africa)

14 July 2013
14:30 EAT (UTC+03)

Kenya	29–17	Zimbabwe
	Stats

Stade Mahamasina, Antananarivo, Madagascar
Attendance: 40,000
Referee: Lourens van der Merwe (South Africa)

== Round 3: 2014 Africa Cup Division 1A ==
The third and final round consisted of 6 matches, featuring the top 4 ranked teams in Africa in a Round-robin format, and doubled as the 2014 Africa Cup Division 1A. The winner, Namibia, qualified for Pool C of the 2015 Rugby World Cup as Africa 1. The runner up, Zimbabwe, advanced to the repechage playoff against Russia.

The 2014 Africa Cup Division 1A took place in Madagascar at Mahamasina Stadium in Antananarivo, between 28 June and 6 July.

Qualified as Africa 1
Advances to Repechage

Place	Nation	Games				Points			Bonus points	Table points
Place	Nation	played	won	drawn	lost	for	against	difference	Bonus points	Table points
1	Namibia	3	2	0	1	135	59	+76	2	10
2	Zimbabwe	3	2	0	1	105	56	+49	2	10
3	Kenya	3	2	0	1	73	50	+23	2	10
4	Madagascar	3	0	0	3	32	180	−148	0	0
Points were awarded to the teams as follows: Win - 4 points Draw - 2 points 4 or more tries - 1 point Loss within 7 points - 1 point Loss greater than 7 points - 0 points

Matches

28 June 2014
13:00 EAT (UTC+03)

(1 BP) Kenya	29–22	Namibia (1 BP)
	Stats

Stade Mahamasina, Antananarivo, Madagascar
Attendance: 35,000
Referee: Luke Pearce (England)

28 June 2014
15:00 EAT (UTC+03)

(1BP) Zimbabwe	57–22	Madagascar
	Stats

Stade Mahamasina, Antananarivo, Madagascar
Attendance: 35,000
Referee: Lourens van der Merwe (South Africa)

2 July 2014
13:00 EAT (UTC+03)

(1 BP) Zimbabwe	20–24	Namibia
	Stats

Stade Mahamasina, Antananarivo, Madagascar
Referee: Francisco Pastrana (Argentina)

2 July 2014
15:00 EAT (UTC+03)

(1 BP) Kenya	34–0	Madagascar
	Stats

Stade Mahamasina, Antananarivo, Madagascar
Referee: Luke Pearce (England)

6 July 2014
13:00 EAT (UTC+03)

Kenya	10–28	Zimbabwe
	Stats

Stade Mahamasina, Antananarivo, Madagascar
Referee: Lourens van der Merwe (South Africa)

6 July 2014
15:00 EAT (UTC+03)

Madagascar	10–89	Namibia (1 BP)
	Stats

Stade Mahamasina, Antananarivo, Madagascar
Referee: Francisco Pastrana (Argentina)
