= Lexo Gugava =

Georgian rugby union & league player

Lexo Gugava (born 17 August 1982 in Lentekhi) is a Georgian rugby union player who plays as a wing.

He plays for RC Lelo Tbilisi in Georgia Championship.

He had 25 caps for Georgia, from 2004 to 2012, scoring 5 tries, 25 points on aggregate.

He was called for the 2011 Rugby World Cup, playing a single game, without scoring. He had a five-week ban after a tip tackle on Argentine Felipe Contepomi in his only presence at the competition.
