= Denis Simplikevich =

- Born: March 11, 1991 (age 35) Novokuznetsk
- Height: 6 ft 4.7 in (1.95 m)
- Weight: 254 lb (18 st 2 lb; 115 kg)

Rugby union career
- Position: Centre
- Current team: Enisei-STM
Senior career
| Years | Team | Apps | (Points) |
| 2009-2010 | Metallurg | 21 | (45) |
| 2011- | Enisei-STM | 154 | (645) |
International career
| Years | Team | Apps | (Points) |
| 2011– | Russia | 30 | (85) |
Medal record
Men's rugby sevens
Representing Russia
Summer Universiade
| Gold medal – first place | 2013 Kazan | Team competition |

Denis Simplikevich (Russian: Денис Симпликевич; born 11 March 1991) is a Russian rugby union footballer. He plays as a centre.

Simplikevich plays for Enisei-STM in Russia, since 2011/12.

He has 27 caps for Russia, since 2011, with 17 tries scored, 85 points on aggregate. Simplikevich was part of the Russian squad at the 2011 Rugby World Cup, playing in two games. He scored a try against Ireland and another against Australia in the pool games.

In the match for the Russian Supercup 2017 against the RC Kuban, he made 7 tries. This is the record of Russia of all times. Enisei-STM won with a score of 64-20.

Simplikevich three times became the top try scorer of the Russian Championship (2012, 2014, 2017).

In the European Rugby Challenge Cup he has 6 tries in 18 matches.

Honours

- Russian Championships (9): 2011, 2012, 2014, 2016, 2017, 2018, 2019, 2020–21, 2021–22
- Russian Cup (6): 2014, 2016, 2017, 2020, 2021, 2022
- Russian Supercup (3): 2014, 2015, 2017
- European Rugby Continental Shield (2): 2016-17, 2017–18
