= Givi Berishvili =

Georgian rugby union player

Givi Berishvili (born 10 August 1987 in Tbilisi) is a Georgian rugby union player who plays as a lock.

He currently plays for RC Eemland in the Dutch Ereklasse.

He has 18 caps for Georgia, since his first game at 29 June 2011, in a 23–18 win over Namibia, in Bucharest, for the IRB Nations Cup. He still has to score his first points. He was called for the 2011 Rugby World Cup, playing in two games as a substitute but without scoring. He is still at the Georgia squad.
