= Yuri Kushnarev =

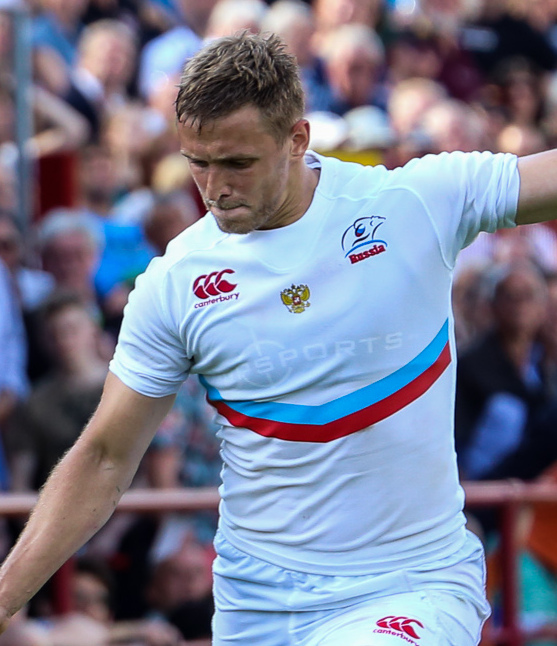
- Kushnarev against Germany in 2015 Rugby World Cup qualifying Repechage playoff.
- Born: 6 June 1985 (age 41) Moscow, Russian SFSR, Soviet Union
- Height: 6 ft 0 in (1.83 m)
- Weight: 210 lb (15 st 0 lb; 95 kg)

Rugby union career
- Position: Fly-half
Senior career
Years	Team	Apps	(Points)
2002–2012	VVA		
2013	Kuban Krasnodar	18	(221)
2014–2018	Yenisey Krasnoyarsk	31	(183)
2021	Krasny Krasnoyarsk	5	(40)
International career
Years	Team	Apps	(Points)
2007–2021	Russia	120	(797)

Yuri Viktorovich Kushnarev (Note: Russian: Юрий Викторович Кушнарёв) (born 6 June 1985) is a Russian former rugby union player. He played as a fullback and/or as a fly-half. Kushnarev is the most capped Russian player as well as the top scorer for Russia. Having played one hundred and twenty times for his country, Kushnarev holds the 24th most caps in international rugby.

== Club career ==
Yuri Kushnarev is the most titled rugby player of Russia. He first played for VVA, from 2002 to 2012, where he won seven titles of Russia, then for RC Kuban, in 2013. Since from 2014 Kushnarev plays for Krasnoyarsk clubs. Since 2014 to 2018, for Enisei-STM. From 2019 to 2021 for Krasny Yar.

Honours

- Russian Championship (11): 2003, 2004, 2006, 2007, 2008, 2009, 2010, 2014, 2016, 2017, 2018
- Russian Cup (9): 2002, 2004, 2005, 2007, 2010, 2014, 2016, 2017, 2019
- Russian Supercup (3): 2014, 2015, 2017
- European Rugby Continental Shield (2): 2016–17, 2017–18

== International career ==
Kushnarev finished his international career for Russia with over one-hundred and fifteen caps. And since 2005 with ten tries, one-hundred and forty seven conversions, one-hundred and thirty seven penalties and one drop goal. Overall over seven-hundred and fifty points on aggregate. Kushnarev was part of the Russian squad at the 2011 Rugby World Cup, playing in three games and scoring one penalty. He also played at the unsuccessful attempt to qualify for the 2015 Rugby World Cup and was a key player in the team that reached their qualification for the 2019 Rugby World Cup. At the 2019 Rugby World Cup, Kushnarev scored one conversion, three penalty goals, and one drop goal. In total he scored fourteen points for Russia.
