= Vasily Artemyev =

Russian rugby union footballer

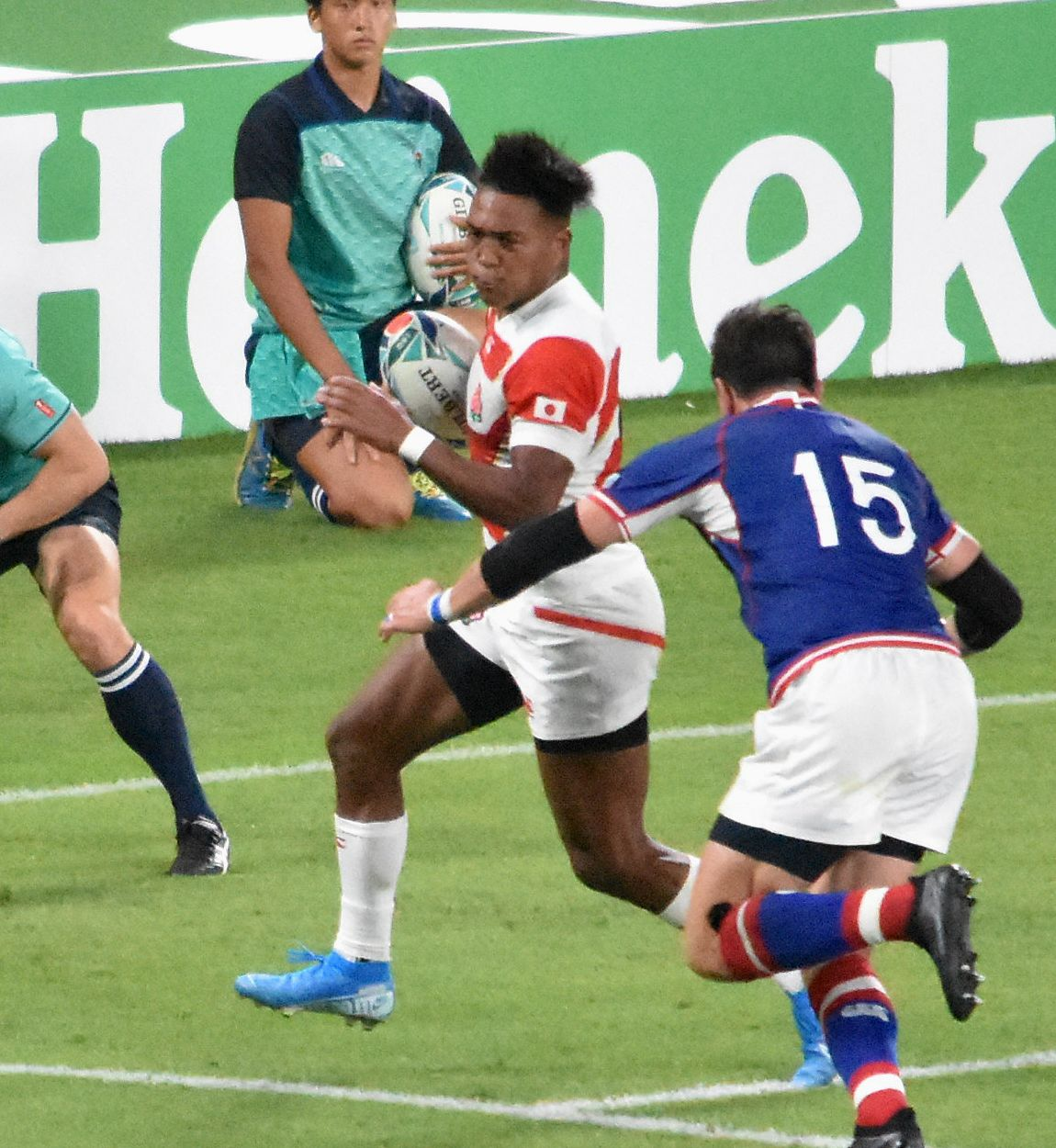
- Born: 24 July 1987 (age 39) Moscow
- Height: 1.80 m (5 ft 11 in)
- Weight: 87 kg (13 st 10 lb; 192 lb)
- School: Blackrock College
- University: University College Dublin

Rugby union career
- Position(s): wing, fullback
Amateur team(s)
Years	Team	Apps	(Points)
2007	Irish Universities		
Senior career
Years	Team	Apps	(Points)
2006−2007	UCD		
2008−2011	VVA		
2011−2013	Northampton Saints	33	(45)
2014−2019	Krasny Yar		
2020−2022	CSKA Moscow		
- Correct as of 24 May 2020
International career
Years	Team	Apps	(Points)
2006	Ireland u19s		
2009−2022	Russia	98	(170)
- Correct as of 1 November 2022

Vasily Grigorievich Artemyev (Russian: Василий Григорьевич Артемьев) (born 24 July 1987) is a Russian rugby union player for CSKA Moscow. He plays as wing or fullback.

== Early life ==
Artemyev was born in Moscow. As a child, he immigrated to Ireland to learn English. During his school years in Ireland, he began playing rugby while at Blackrock College. He also studied law at University College Dublin.

== Career ==
Returning to his native Moscow (Zelenograd) in 2008, he joined professional club VVA and began representing Russia.

Vasily signed for Aviva Premiership side Northampton Saints for the 2011-2012 season, joining them after the conclusion of the 2011 World Cup. On his début for the club he scored a hat-trick in the LV= Cup victory over Saracens, before scoring two tries in his Premiership debut against Newcastle Falcons.

He was a player for Russia, since 2009 to 2022, with 30 tries scored, 170 points on aggregate. He played four games at the 2011 Rugby World Cup, scoring a try against Ireland in a pool game.
