= Slava Metreveli Central Stadium =

Stadion in Sochi

- Central Stadium
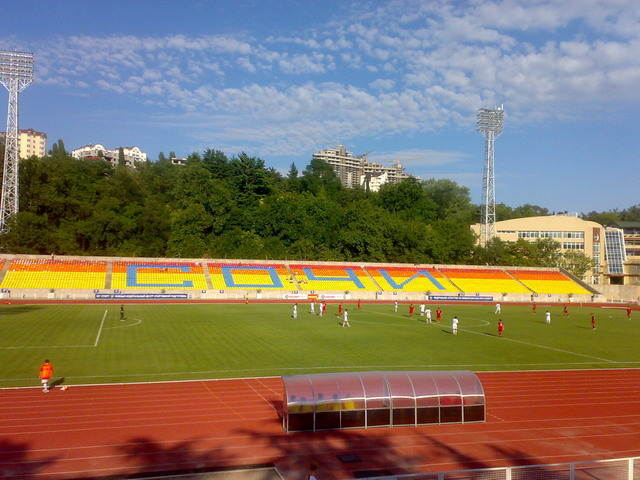
- view of Central Stadium of Slava Metreveli
- Interactive map of Slava Metreveli Central Stadium
- Location: Sochi, Russia
- Coordinates: 43°33′54″N 39°45′10″E
- Owner: City municipality
- Operator: Federal State Unitary Enterprise "South Sports"
- Capacity: 10,200
- Executive suites: 30
- Surface: Grass
- Scoreboard: Electroimpex Hungary
- Record attendance: 8'800
- Field size: 105×68 м

Construction
- Built: 1961
- Opened: 19 April 1964
- Renovated: 1991
- Expanded: 2010

Tenants
- Zhemchuzhina Sochi (1991–2012); FC Sochi-04 (2004–2009); FC Sochi 2013 (2013–2017)

The Slava Metreveli Central Stadium (Russian: Центральный стадион имени Славы Метревели, Tsentralnyi Stadion imeni Slavy Metreveli) is a multi-purpose stadium in Sochi, Russia, named after the Soviet footballer. It is used mostly for football matches and sometimes in other sports disciplines.

The stadium was opened 19 April 1964 football match between Syria and the RSFSR

The stadium seats 10,200 people.

Record attendance is set to 1/16 final match between the teams of the Cup of Russia FC Zhemchuzhina-Sochi and Rostov (Rostov-on-Don) (1:2, 17 July 2011)

On 3 December 2010 the stadium was visited by Russian Prime Minister Vladimir Putin for the first time.

== International matches ==
6 March 1973 European Cup Winners' Cup	FC Spartak Moscow (Soviet Union)	0–1	(Italy) AC Milan
22:00		Report	Romeo Benetti 62'	Attendance: 18,000 (?); Referee: John Keith Taylor (England)

6 April 2011 Friendly Under-19	Russia	1–0	Italy
18:00	Alexsandr Kozlov 16'			Referee: Vitali Anisimov (Russia)

27 March 2015 Women's Under-17 Championship	Belgium	0–4	Spain
14:00				Referee: Henrikke Nervik (Norway)
