= Kirill Kulemin =

Russian rugby union player (born 1990)

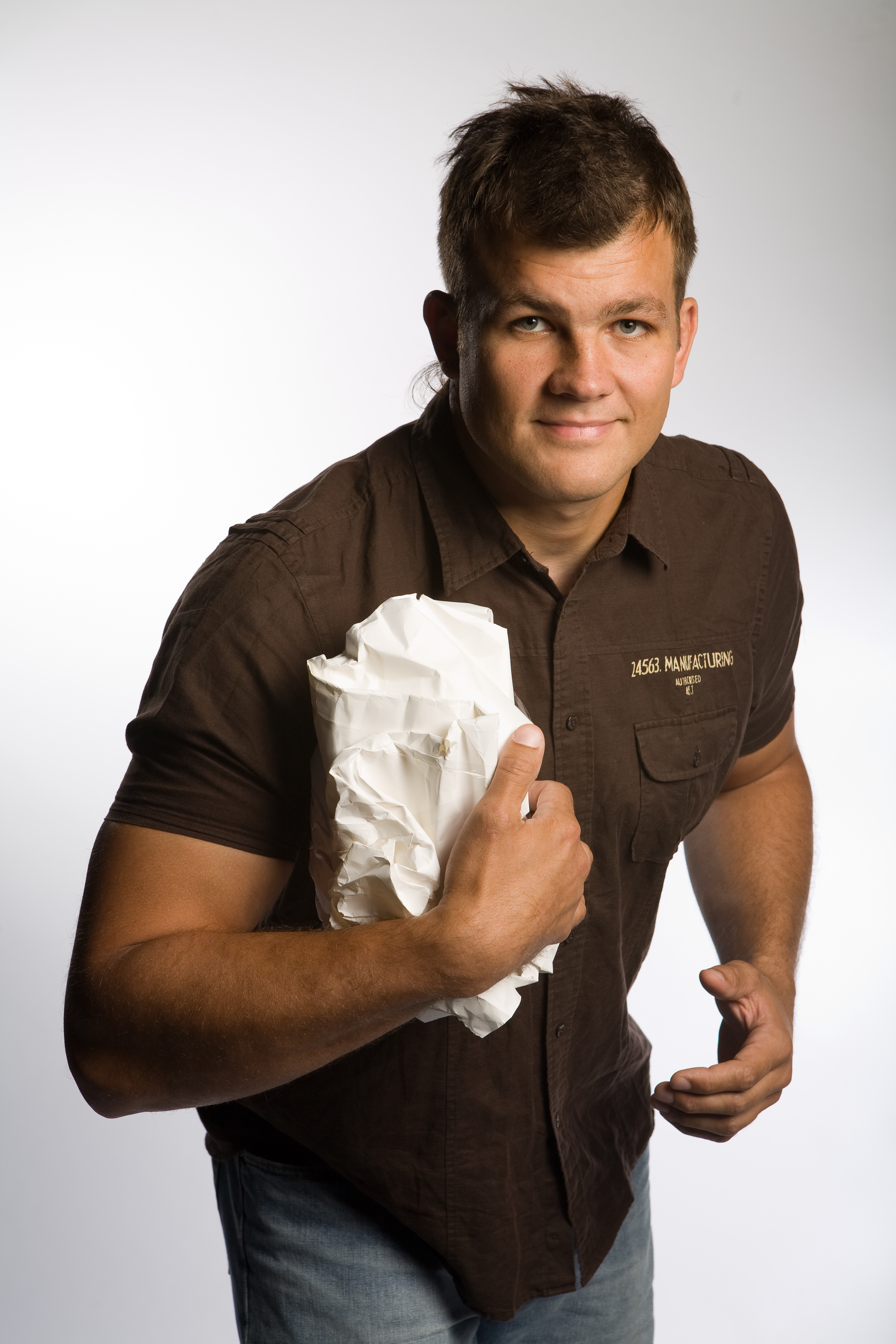
- Born: Kirill Leonidovich Kulemin; October 13, 1980 (age 46) Moscow, Soviet Union
- Height: 1.98 m (6 ft 6 in)
- Weight: 125 kg (276 lb)

Rugby union career
- Position: Lock
Senior career
Years	Team	Apps	(Points)
2004–2008	SU Agen	94	(15)
2008–2012	Castres Olympique	64	(10)
2012–2013	London Welsh	22	(0)
2013–2014	Sale Sharks	13	(0)
2014–2016	USA Perpignan	49	(10)
- Correct as of 30 December 2019 @ 17:20:36 PM (AEST)
International career
Years	Team	Apps	(Points)
2006-2014	Russia	33	(20)
- Correct as of 26 March 2019
- Rugby league career

Playing information
Club
Years	Team	Pld	T	G	FG	P
2000	Moscow Magicians
Representative
Years	Team	Pld	T	G	FG	P
2000–2003	Russia	3				0

Kirill Kulemin (born 13 October 1980) is a Russian rugby union player currently playing for USA Perpignan in the Pro D2. Born in Moscow, he previously played rugby league for Dynamo Moscow and his talents were noticed playing in a Challenge Cup match in 2004. His position is at lock or in the forwards. Kulemin left London Welsh to join Sale Sharks for the 2013/14 season. After a spell with Sale Sharks, it was confirmed Kulemin will return to France to join USA Perpignan, who were relegated to the Pro D2.

He had 33 caps for Russia, from 2006 to 2014, scoring 4 tries, 20 points on aggregate. Kulemin also played for Russia at the 2000 Rugby League World Cup, playing in the match against Australia, He also played other two matches in 2003, one year before switching to union. He missed the 2011 Rugby World Cup due to an injury sustained in Wales: he was tackled by two or three players, and as a result of an unsuccessful movement, Kulemin suffered a knee injury. Two days later, he had his knee operated, which theoretically would allow him to play, but subsequent complications ruled out his participation at the tournament.
