= Vladimir Ostroushko =

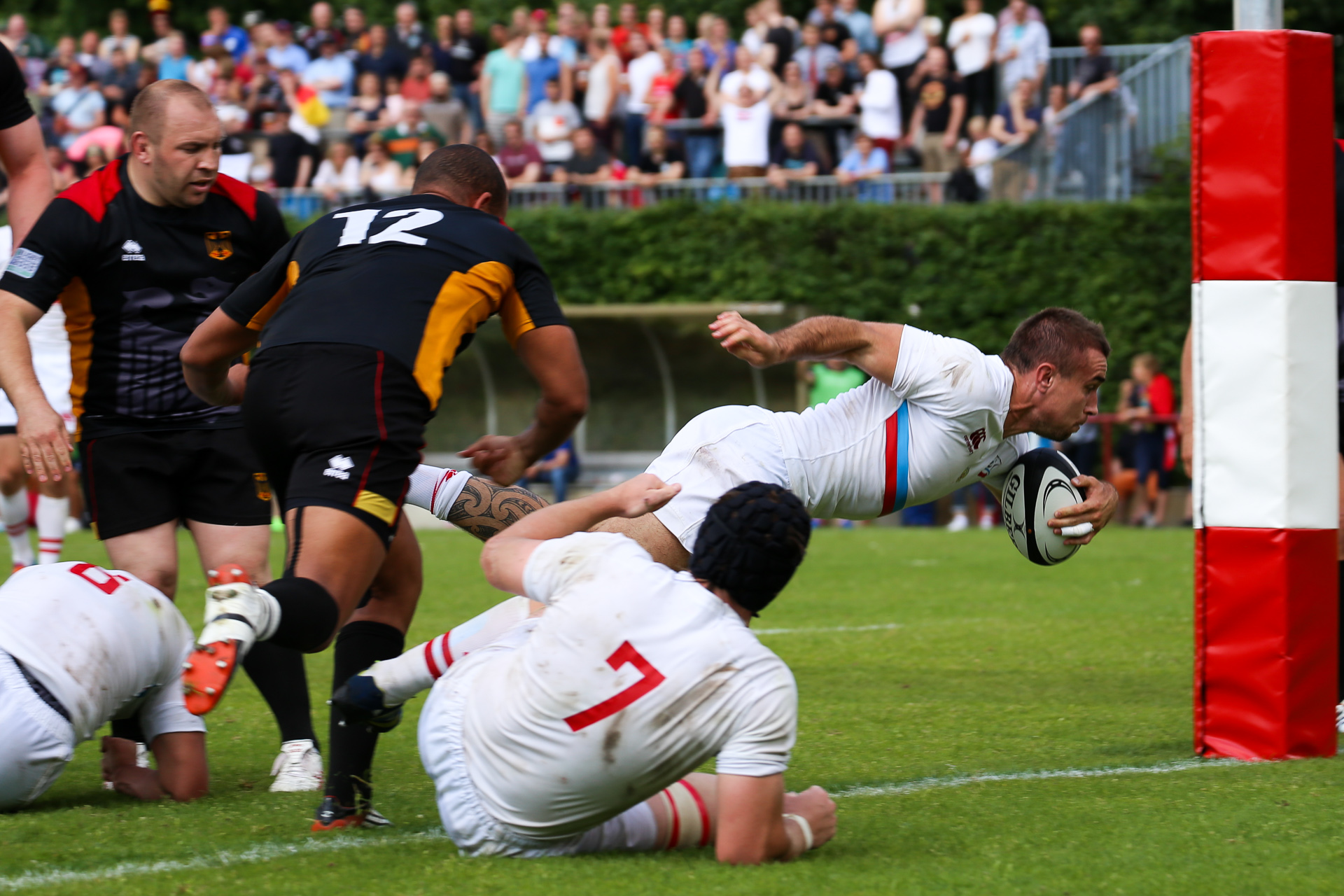
- Vladimir Ostroushko in the Rugby World Cup qualification game with Germany in Hamburg, 24 May 2014
- Born: 30 September 1986 (age 40) Krasnodar
- Height: 6 ft 0 in (1.83 m)
- Weight: 213 lb (97 kg)

Rugby union career
- Position: Wing
International career
Years	Team	Apps	(Points)
2006–2020	Russia	51	(125)
National sevens team
Years	Team		Comps
- Russia 7s
Medal record
Men's rugby sevens
Representing Russia
Summer Universiade
Gold medal – first place	2013 Kazan	Team competition

Vladimir Sergeevich Ostroushko (Russian: Владимир Сергеевич Остроушко; born 30 September 1986) is a former Russian rugby union player. He played as a wing.

He played for RC Kuban, from 2012/13 to 2019/20, when he finished his career.

He had 51 caps for Russia, since 2006, with 25 tries scored, 125 points on aggregate. he had his first game at the 67–7 loss to Italy, at 14 October 2006, in Moscow, for the 2007 Rugby World Cup qualifyings. Ostroushko was part of the Russian squad at the 2011 Rugby World Cup, playing in all the four games and scoring two tries. He was called for the 2019 Rugby World Cup, playing a single game but without scoring. He had his last game at the 32–25 win over Romania, at 7 March 2020, in Krasnodar, for the Six Nations B, aged 33 years old.

Ostroushko also played for the Russia national rugby sevens team, and represented Russia during the 2015-16 World Rugby Sevens Series.
