= Valery Tsnobiladze =

Russian rugby union player (born c. 1980)

Valery Zhironovich Tsnobiladze (Russian: Валерий Жиронович Цнобиладзе) (born Vorkuta, 3 November 1980) is a Russian rugby union player who plays as a hooker. He is of Georgian descent.

Tsnobiladze played for Krasny Yar Krasnoyarsk (2004), RC Novokuznetsk (2005–2011), and Yenisey-STM Krasnoyarsk (2011–2013). He plays once again for Krasny Yar Krasnoyarsk since 2013.

He had 43 caps for Russia, from 2010 to 2018, scoring 5 tries, 25 points on aggregate. He had his debut at the 40–20 loss to Argentina Jaguars, at 23 October 2010, in Moscow, in a tour, aged 29 years old. He was called for the 2011 Rugby World Cup, playing in two games, one of them as a substitute. He was suspended after headbutting an adversary player in the game with Ireland, in a 62–12 loss. He returned to the national team afterwards and was a regular player until his last game, at the 57–3 win over Germany, at 18 March 2018, in Cologne, for the 2019 Rugby World Cup qualifiers, aged 37 years old.
