= European Shield =

Rugby competition

- Competition logo
- Sport: Rugby union
- Instituted: 2002
- Inaugural season: 2002–03
- Number of teams: 16
- Nations: England; France; Italy; Portugal; Romania; Spain; Wales
- Holders: Auch (2004–05)
- Most titles: (France) Castres Olympique (France) Montpellier (France) Auch (1 title)
- Website: Official site
- Related competition: Heineken Cup; European Challenge Cup

The European Shield (known as the Parker Pen Shield for sponsorship reasons) was a repechage tournament for teams knocked out in the first round of the European Challenge Cup. As such, it formed Europe's third-tier club rugby union competition below the Heineken Cup and European Challenge Cup. The name "European Shield" had previously been used for the now renamed European Challenge Cup.

A total of 16 teams participated in each season. The competition was contested between the first round losers from the European Challenge Cup with teams being added directly to make up the full 16 team complement. The structure of the competition was a purely knockout format; teams played each other on a home and away basis, with the aggregate points winner proceeding to the next round. The final was a single leg.

The competition had a brief existence, running for just three seasons in 2002–03, 2003–04 and 2004–05. Three clubs won the competition in each year that it was run and there were three different runners up. Thereafter, the European Challenge Cup reverted to its previous "pool and knockout" format and the European Shield was discontinued.

== Winners of the European Shield ==
Year	Winner	Score	Runner up	Venue	Attendance
2002–03	Castres Olympique (France)	40–12	(Wales) Caerphilly	Madejski Stadium, Reading (England)	3,500
2003–04	Montpellier (France)	25–19	(Italy) Viadana	Stadio Sergio Lanfranchi, Parma (Italy)	2,553
2004–05	Auch (France)	23–10	(England) Worcester Warriors	Kassam Stadium, Oxford (England)	2,823

== Seasons ==
=== 2002–03 competition ===
This competition was contested between the first round losers from the 2002–03 European Challenge Cup. A total of 16 teams participated, representing five countries.

The competition began on 6 December 2002 and culminated in the final at the Madejski Stadium in Reading on 25 May 2003. Castres Olympique secured a victory over Caerphilly in the final and picked up their first piece of European Club silverware.

==== Teams ====
France	Italy	Romania	Spain	Wales
Castres Olympique; Grenoble; Mont de Marsan; Pau	Gran Parma; L'Aquila; Overmach Parma; Petrarca Padova; Rugby Roma; Rovigo; Rugby Silea	Dinamo București	La Moraleja; UC Madrid	Caerphilly; Ebbw Vale

==== Final ====
25 May 2003
13:00

Caerphilly (Wales)	12–40	(France) Castres Olympique
Try: Boobyer; El-Abd; Con: Thomas (1)	Report	Try: Roque; Forment (2); Spanghero; Arbo; Con: Teulet (3); Pen: Teulet (3)

Madejski Stadium, Reading, Berkshire
Attendance: 4,000
Referee: Donal Courtney (Ireland)

=== 2003–04 competition ===
This competition was contested between 12 first round losers from the 2003–04 European Challenge Cup plus 4 other Clubs entering directly into the 1st Round. A total of 16 teams participated, representing five countries.

The competition began on 10 January 2004 and culminated in the final at the Stadio Luigi Zaffanella in Viadana on 21 May 2004. Montpellier secured a victory over Viadana in the final and picked up their first piece of European Club silverware.

==== Teams ====
England	France	Italy	Portugal	Spain
Rotherham	Montpellier	Gran Parma; L'Aquila; Leonessa; Overmach Parma; Petrarca Padova; Rugby Roma; Rovigo; Viadana		El Salvador; Valladolid RAC
			AA Coimbra; Clube Rugby Lisboa	UC Madrid; UE Santboiana

==== Final ====
21 May 2004
21:00

Montpellier (France)	25–19	(Italy) Viadana
Try: Buada; Arbo; Daniell; Con: Bortolussi (1); Jouve (1); Pen: Jouve (2)	Report	Try: Steyn (1); Con: Steyn (1); Pen: Steyn (4)

Stadio Sergio Lanfranchi, Parma
Attendance: 2,553
Referee: Dave Pearson (England)

=== 2004–05 competition ===
This competition was intended to be contested between 12 first round losers from the 2004–05 European Challenge Cup, plus 4 other Clubs that joined directly at the 1st Round of the Shield. AA Coimbra subsequently declined to play in the competition. therefore a total of 15 teams participated, representing six countries.

The competition began on 4 December 2004 and culminated in the final at Kassam Stadium in Oxford on 21 May 2005. Auch secured a victory over Worcester Warriors in the final and picked up their first piece of European Club silverware.

==== Teams ====
England	France	Italy	Portugal	Romania	Spain
Leeds Tykes; Worcester Warriors	Auch; Bayonne	Catania; Gran Parma; L'Aquila; Leonessa; Petrarca Padova; Rovigo	AA Coimbra		Valladolid RAC
			Clube Rugby Lisboa	București	Bera Bera; UC Madrid

==== Final ====
21 May 2005
17:00

Worcester Warriors (England)	10–23	(France) Auch
Try: O'Leary (1); Con: Hayes (1); Pen: Hayes (1)	Stats; Report	Try: Bastide (1); Patat (1); Con: Dambielle (2); Pen: Dambielle (3)

Kassam Stadium, Oxford
Attendance: 2,823
Referee: Carlo Damasco (Italy)

== See also ==
- Heineken Cup
- European Challenge Cup
- Aviva Premiership
- National Rugby League (France)
- Pro14
- Top12
