= 2003–04 European Shield =

2003-04 European Shield

Tournament details
- Countries: England; France; Italy; Portugal; Spain
- Tournament format(s): Knockout
- Date: 10 January 2004 - 21 May 2004

Tournament statistics
- Teams: 16
- Matches played: 29
- Attendance: 27,489 (948 per match)
- Tries scored: 176 (6.07 per match)

Final
- Venue: Stadio Luigi Zaffanella, Viadana
- Attendance: 2,553
- Champions: (France) Montpellier (1st title)
- Runners-up: (Italy) Viadana

The 2003–04 European Shield (known as the Parker Pen Shield for sponsorship reasons) was the 2nd season of the European Shield, Europe's third-tier club rugby union competition below the Heineken Cup and European Challenge Cup. A total of 16 teams participated, representing five countries.

This competition was contested between 12 first round losers from the 2003–04 European Challenge Cup plus 4 other Clubs entering directly into the 1st Round. The structure of the competition was a purely knockout format; teams played each other on a home and away basis, with the aggregate points winner proceeding to the next round. The final was a single leg.

The competition began on 10 January 2004 and culminated in the final at the Stadio Luigi Zaffanella in Viadana on 21 May 2004. Montpellier secured a victory over Viadana in the final and picked up their first piece of European Club silverware.

== Teams ==
This competition was contested between 12 first round losers from the 2003–04 European Challenge Cup, plus 4 other Clubs that joined directly at the 1st Round of the Shield.

England	France	Italy	Portugal	Spain
Rotherham	Montpellier	Gran Parma; L'Aquila; Leonessa; Overmach Parma; Petrarca Padova; Rugby Roma; Rovigo; Viadana		El Salvador; Valladolid RAC
			AA Coimbra; Clube Rugby Lisboa	UC Madrid; UE Santboiana

== Matches ==
=== Round 1 ===
All kickoff times are local to the match location.

==== 1st leg ====
10 January 2004
14:30

Clube Rugby Lisboa (Portugal)	25 – 13	(Italy) Leonessa
	Report

Estádio Universitário de Lisboa
Attendance: 1,000
Referee: Malcolm Changleng (Scotland)

10 January 2004
15:00

AA Coimbra (Portugal)	0 – 45	(Italy) Petrarca Padova
	Report

Estádio Municipal Sérgio Conceição
Referee: David Changleng (Scotland)

10 January 2004
15:00

L'Aquila (Italy)	36 – 22	(Spain) UE Santboiana
	Report

Stadio Tommaso Fattori
Attendance: 500
Referee: Sean Davy (England)

10 January 2004
15:00

Rovigo (Italy)	48 – 13	(Spain) El Salvador
	Report

Stadio Comunale Mario Battaglini
Attendance: 300
Referee: Marshall Kilgore (Ireland)

10 January 2004
16:00

UC Madrid (Spain)	27 – 60	(Italy) Viadana
	Report

Ciudad Universitaria
Attendance: 500
Referee: Andy Ireland (Scotland)

10 January 2004
19:30

Montpellier (France)	46 – 10	(Italy) Rugby Roma
	Report

Stade Sabathé
Attendance: 2,500
Referee: Wayne Barnes (England)

11 January 2004
12:30

Valladolid RAC (Spain)	9 – 15	(Italy) Overmach Parma
	Report

Estadio Pepe Rojo
Attendance: 1,200
Referee: Neil Ballard (Wales)

11 January 2004
14:30

Gran Parma (Italy)	41 – 33	(England) Rotherham
	Report

Stadio Sergio Lanfranchi
Attendance: 300
Referee: Franck Maciello (France)

==== 2nd leg ====
17 January 2004
14:30

Overmach Parma (Italy)	27 – 10	(Spain) Valladolid RAC
	Report

Stadio Sergio Lanfranchi
Attendance: 400
Referee: Franck Maciello (France)

17 January 2004
14:30

Viadana (Italy)	43 – 3	(Spain) UC Madrid
	Report

Stadio Luigi Zaffanella
Attendance: 500
Referee: Malcolm Changleng (Scotland)

17 January 2004
15:00

Petrarca Padova (Italy)	83 – 3	(Portugal) AA Coimbra
	Report

Stadio Plebiscito
Attendance: 500
Referee: Sean Davy (England)

17 January 2004
17:00

Leonessa (Italy)	42 – 18	(Portugal) Clube Rugby Lisboa
	Report

Campo Comunale di Rugby
Attendance: 800
Referee: Marshall Kilgore (Ireland)

18 January 2004
12:30

El Salvador (Spain)	40 – 24	(Italy) Rovigo
	Report

Estadio Pepe Rojo
Attendance: 1,100
Referee: Wayne Barnes (England)

18 January 2004
12:30

UE Santboiana (Spain)	26 – 8	(Italy) L'Aquila
	Report

Estadi Baldiri Aleu
Attendance: 1,600
Referee: Andy Ireland (Scotland)

18 January 2004
13:00

Rotherham (England)	42 – 17	(Italy) Gran Parma
	Report

Millmoor
Attendance: 1,183
Referee: Phil Fear (Wales)

18 January 2004
14:30

Rugby Roma (Italy)	10 – 22	(France) Montpellier
	Report

Stadio Tre Fontane
Attendance: 100
Referee: David Rose (England)

==== Aggregate Results ====
Proceed to Quarter-final	Match points	Aggregate score	Points margin	Eliminated from competition
Petrarca Padova (Italy)	4 – 2	128 – 3	125	(Portugal) AA Coimbra
Viadana (Italy)	4 – 2	103 – 30	73	(Spain) UC Madrid
Montpellier (France)	4 – 2	68 – 20	48	(Italy) Rugby Roma
Overmach Parma (Italy)	4 – 2	42 – 19	23	(Spain) Valladolid RAC
Rovigo (Italy)	2 – 2	72 – 53	19	(Spain) El Salvador
Rotherham (England)	2 – 2	75 – 58	17	(Italy) Gran Parma
Leonessa (Italy)	2 – 2	55 – 43	12	(Portugal) Clube Rugby Lisboa
UE Santboiana (Spain)	2 – 2	48 – 44	4	(Italy) L'Aquila

=== Quarter-finals ===
==== 1st leg ====
All kickoff times are local to the match location.

24 January 2004
14:30

Overmach Parma (Italy)	29 – 10	(Italy) Rovigo
	Report

Stadio Sergio Lanfranchi
Attendance: 500
Referee: Franck Maciello (France)

24 January 2004
14:30

Viadana (Italy)	32 – 30	(England) Rotherham
	Report

Stadio Luigi Zaffanella
Attendance: 1,200
Referee: R McDowell (Ireland)

24 January 2004
15:00

UE Santboiana (Spain)	19 – 27	(Italy) Leonessa
	Report

Estadi Baldiri Aleu
Attendance: 1,000
Referee: Jean Matheu (France)

24 January 2004
19:30

Montpellier (France)	34 – 6	(Italy) Petrarca Padova
	Report

Stade Sabathé
Attendance: 2,300
Referee: David Changleng (Scotland)

==== 2nd leg ====
All kickoff times are local to the match location.

31 January 2004
15:00

Petrarca Padova (Italy)	18 – 9	(France) Montpellier
	Report

Stadio Plebiscito
Attendance: 1,000
Referee: Wayne Barnes (England)

31 January 2004
15:00

Rotherham (England)	22 – 21	(Italy) Viadana
	Report

Millmoor
Attendance: 1,153
Referee: Christophe Berdos (France)

31 January 2004
15:00

Rovigo (Italy)	24 – 20	(Italy) Overmach Parma
	Report

Stadio Comunale Mario Battaglini
Attendance: 800
Referee: Simon McDowell (Ireland)

31 January 2004
17:00

Leonessa (Italy)	28 – 10	(Spain) UE Santboiana
	Report

Campo Comunale di Rugby
Attendance: 800
Referee: David Keane (Ireland)

==== Aggregate Results ====
Proceed to Semifinal	Match points	Aggregate score	Points margin	Eliminated from competition
Leonessa (Italy)	4 – 2	55 – 29	26	(Spain) UE Santboiana
Montpellier (France)	2 – 2	43 – 24	19	(Italy) Petrarca Padova
Overmach Parma (Italy)	2 – 2	49 – 34	15	(Italy) Rovigo
Viadana (Italy)	2 – 2	53 – 52	1	(England) Rotherham

=== Semifinals ===
All kickoff times are local to the match location.

==== 1st leg ====
9 April 2004
19:30

Montpellier (France)	45 – 12	(Italy) Leonessa
	Report

Stade Sabathé
Attendance: 1,000
Referee: Sean Davey (England)

10 April 2004
15:00

Overmach Parma (Italy)	32 – 42	(Italy) Viadana
	Report

Stadio Sergio Lanfranchi
Attendance: 500
Referee: Malcolm Changleng (Scotland)

==== 2nd leg ====
24 April 2004
15:00

Leonessa (Italy)	23 – 26	(France) Montpellier
	Report

Campo Comunale di Rugby
Attendance: 500
Referee: David Changleng (Scotland)

25 April 2004
15:05

Viadana (Italy)	33 – 27	(Italy) Overmach Parma
	Report

Stadio Luigi Zaffanella
Attendance: 1,200
Referee: Christophe Berdos (France)

==== Aggregate Results ====
Proceed to Final	Match points	Aggregate score	Points margin	Eliminated from competition
Montpellier (France)	4 – 2	71 – 35	36	(Italy) Leonessa
Viadana (Italy)	4 – 2	75 – 59	16	(Italy) Overmach Parma

=== Final ===
21 May 2004
21:00

Montpellier (France)	25 – 19	(Italy) Viadana
Try: Buada; Arbo; Daniell; Con: Bortolussi (1); Jouve (1); Pen: Jouve (2)	Report	Try: Steyn (1); Con: Steyn (1); Pen: Steyn (4)

Stadio Sergio Lanfranchi, Parma
Attendance: 2,553
Referee: Dave Pearson (England)

== See also ==
- 2003-04 Heineken Cup
- 2003-04 European Challenge Cup
- European Shield
