= 2001–02 European Challenge Cup pool stage =

2001–02 Parker Pen Shield pool stage
- Season: 2001–02 Parker Pen Shield
- Date: 28 September 2001 – 13 January 2002

Qualifiers
- Seed 1: (England) Saracens
- Seed 2: (England) Gloucester
- Seed 3: (England) Sale Sharks
- Seed 4: (France) Pau
- Seed 5: (England) London Irish
- Seed 6: (England) Bristol Shoguns
- Seed 7: (Wales) Ebbw Vale
- Seed 8: (Wales) Pontypridd

The 2001–02 European Challenge Cup pool stage (known as the Parker Pen Shield for sponsorship reasons) was the opening stage of the sixth season of the European Challenge Cup, the second-tier competition for European rugby union clubs. It began when Connacht hosted Narbonne on 28 September 2001 and ended with four matches on 13 January 2002.

Thirty two teams participated in this phase of the competition; they were divided into eight pools of four teams each, with each team playing the others home and away. Competition points were award for games won (2 points) and drawn (1 point). There were no points for losing, nor were there bonus points as in the more modern bonus point system. The eight pool winners advanced to the knockout stage. These teams then competed in a single-elimination tournament that ended with the final at the Kassam Stadium in Oxford on 26 May 2002.

== Results ==
All kickoff times are local to the match location.

Key to colours
Winner of each pool, advance to quarterfinals. Seed # in parentheses

=== Pool 1 ===
Team	P	W	D	L	Tries for	Tries against	Try diff	Points for	Points against	Points diff	Pts
(Wales) Ebbw Vale (7)	6	4	0	2	15	10	5	153	90	63	8
(France) Agen	6	4	0	2	25	13	12	199	119	80	8
(France) Montauban	6	4	0	2	16	9	7	146	123	23	8
(Italy) Rovigo	6	0	0	6	8	32	−24	78	244	−166	0
Source : www.ercrugby.com Points breakdown: *2 points for a win *1 point for a draw
Ebbw Vale, Agen and Montauban finished on the same Competition Points. In head-to-head matches Ebbw Vale beat Agen 68–30 on aggregate, having won one game and lost the other Ebbw Vale beat Montauban 31–24 on aggregate, having won one game and lost the other Agen beat Montauban 60–41 on aggregate, having won one game and lost the other hence Ebbw Vale top the table

29 September 2001
19:30

Agen (France)	20 - 9	(Wales) Ebbw Vale
	Report

Stade Armandie
Attendance: 2,000

30 September 2001
15:00

Rovigo (Italy)	23 - 41	(France) Montauban
	Report

Stadio Comunale Mario Battaglini

6 October 2001
19:30

Ebbw Vale (Wales)	28 - 26	(Italy) Rovigo
	Report

Eugene Cross Park
Attendance: 1,500

6 October 2001
19:30

Montauban (France)	28 - 26	(France) Agen
	Report

Stade Sapiac
Attendance: 5,000

26 October 2001
19:30

Ebbw Vale (Wales)	16 - 5	(France) Montauban
	Report

Eugene Cross Park
Attendance: 2,500

28 October 2001
15:00

Rovigo (Italy)	3 - 43	(France) Agen
	Report

Stadio Comunale Mario Battaglini
Attendance: 1,000

3 November 2001
19:30

Agen (France)	66 - 7	(Italy) Rovigo
	Report

Stade Armandie
Attendance: 2,500

3 November 2001
19:30

Montauban (France)	19 - 15	(Wales) Ebbw Vale
	Report

Stade Sapiac

4 January 2002
19:30

Agen (France)	34 - 13	(France) Montauban
	Report

Stade Armandie
Attendance: 3,000

6 January 2002
14:30

Rovigo (Italy)	10 - 26	(Wales) Ebbw Vale
	Report

Stadio Comunale Mario Battaglini
Attendance: 600

12 January 2002
15:00

Ebbw Vale (Wales)	59 - 10	(France) Agen
	Report

Eugene Cross Park
Attendance: 1,800

12 January 2002
19:30

Montauban (France)	40 - 9	(Italy) Rovigo
	Report

Stade Sapiac
Attendance: 3,000

=== Pool 2 ===
Team	P	W	D	L	Tries for	Tries against	Try diff	Points for	Points against	Points diff	Pts
(France) Pau (4)	6	6	0	0	27	3	24	217	63	154	12
(France) Colomiers	6	4	0	2	32	9	23	259	105	154	8
(Italy) Petrarca Padova	6	2	0	4	14	26	−12	114	223	−109	4
(Spain) UC Madrid	6	0	0	6	8	43	−35	90	289	−199	0
Source : www.ercrugby.com Points breakdown: *2 points for a win *1 point for a draw

29 September 2001
19:30

Pau (France)	35 - 0	(Italy) Petrarca Padova
	Report

Stade du Hameau

30 September 2001
12:30

UC Madrid (Spain)	16 - 36	(France) Colomiers
	Report

Complejo Deportivo Sur
Attendance: 800

6 October 2001
15:00

Petrarca Padova (Italy)	41 - 12	(Spain) UC Madrid
	Report

Stadio Plebiscito
Attendance: 1,000

6 October 2001
19:00

Colomiers (France)	12 - 18	(France) Pau
	Report

Stade Selery
Attendance: 4,000

27 October 2001
15:00

Petrarca Padova (Italy)	12 - 74	(France) Colomiers
	Report

Stadio Plebiscito
Attendance: 1,000

27 October 2001
19:30

Pau (France)	66 - 10	(Spain) UC Madrid
	Report

Stade du Hameau

3 November 2001
19:00

Colomiers (France)	45 - 6	(Italy) Petrarca Padova
	Report

Stade Selery
Attendance: 3,200

4 November 2001

UC Madrid (Spain)	10 - 30	(France) Pau
	Report

Complejo Deportivo Sur
Attendance: 300

5 January 2002
12:30

UC Madrid (Spain)	29 - 36	(Italy) Petrarca Padova
	Report

Complejo Deportivo Sur
Attendance: 300

5 January 2002
19:30

Pau (France)	40 - 12	(France) Colomiers
	Report

Stade du Hameau
Attendance: 4,265

12 January 2002
15:00

Petrarca Padova (Italy)	19 - 28	(France) Pau
	Report

Stadio Plebiscito
Attendance: 1,000

12 January 2002
19:00

Colomiers (France)	80 - 13	(Spain) UC Madrid
	Report

Stade Selery
Attendance: 3,100

=== Pool 3 ===
Team	P	W	D	L	Tries for	Tries against	Try diff	Points for	Points against	Points diff	Pts
(Wales) Pontypridd (8)	6	4	0	2	12	7	5	139	87	52	8
(England) Leeds Tykes	6	4	0	2	21	15	6	188	154	34	8
(France) Béziers	6	2	0	4	15	19	−4	136	187	−51	4
(Italy) Overmach Parma	6	2	0	4	11	18	−7	127	162	−35	4
Source : www.ercrugby.com Points breakdown: *2 points for a win *1 point for a draw
Pontypridd and Leeds finished on the same Competition Points. In head-to-head matches, Pontypridd beat Leeds 55–46 on aggregate, having won one game and lost the other.
Béziers and Overmach Parma finished on the same Competition Points. In head-to-head matches, Béziers beat Overmach Parma 63–60 on aggregate, having won one game and lost the other.

29 September 2001
15:00

Béziers (France)	23 - 12	(Wales) Pontypridd
	Report

Stade de la Méditerranée
Attendance: 4,000

29 September 2001
19:30

Overmach Parma (Italy)	41 - 10	(England) Leeds Tykes
	Report

Stadio de Rugby

6 October 2001
14:30

Pontypridd (Wales)	31 - 10	(Italy) Overmach Parma
	Report

Sardis Road
Attendance: 2,500

7 October 2001
14:30

Leeds Tykes (England)	48 - 17	(France) Béziers
	Report

Headingley Stadium
Attendance: 2,229

27 October 2001
15:00

Overmach Parma (Italy)	41 - 29	(France) Béziers
	Report

Stadio de Rugby

28 October 2001
14:30

Leeds Tykes (England)	30 - 27	(Wales) Pontypridd
	Report

Headingley Stadium
Attendance: 2,642

3 November 2001
15:00

Béziers (France)	34 - 19	(Italy) Overmach Parma
	Report

Stade de la Méditerranée

3 November 2001
17:30

Pontypridd (Wales)	28 - 16	(England) Leeds Tykes
	Report

Sardis Road
Attendance: 4,200

5 January 2002
15:00

Béziers (France)	25 - 26	(England) Leeds Tykes
	Report

Stade de la Méditerranée
Attendance: 3,500

6 January 2002
14:30

Overmach Parma (Italy)	P - P	(Wales) Pontypridd
	Report

Stadio de Rugby

- Parma refused to travel. Pontypridd were awarded the match points.

12 January 2002
17:30

Pontypridd (Wales)	41 - 8	(France) Béziers
	Report

Sardis Road
Attendance: 3,000

13 January 2002
14:30

Leeds Tykes (England)	58 - 16	(Italy) Overmach Parma
	Report

Headingley Stadium
Attendance: 1,431

=== Pool 4 ===
Team	P	W	D	L	Tries for	Tries against	Try diff	Points for	Points against	Points diff	Pts
(England) Sale Sharks (3)	6	6	0	0	40	7	33	286	79	207	12
(Ireland) Connacht	6	3	0	3	15	17	−2	157	140	17	6
(France) Narbonne	6	3	0	3	13	9	4	128	111	17	6
(Italy) Rugby Roma	6	0	0	6	7	42	−35	57	298	−241	0
Source : www.ercrugby.com Points breakdown: *2 points for a win *1 point for a draw

28 September 2001
19:00

Connacht (Ireland)	18 - 6	(France) Narbonne
	Report

Ericsson Park, Athlone
Attendance: 1,500

29 September 2001
15:00

Sale Sharks (England)	93 - 0	(Italy) Rugby Roma
	Report

Heywood Road
Attendance: 2,807

6 October 2001
14:30

Rugby Roma (Italy)	10 - 20	(Ireland) Connacht
	Report

Stadio Tre Fontane
Attendance: 800

6 October 2001
19:30

Narbonne (France)	10 - 13	(England) Sale Sharks
	Report

Parc des Sports Et de l'Amitié
Attendance: 3,500

27 October 2001
14:30

Connacht (Ireland)	30 - 33	(England) Sale Sharks
	Report

Galway Sportsgrounds
Attendance: 1,200

27 October 2001
19:30

Narbonne (France)	40 - 0	(Italy) Rugby Roma
	Report

Parc des Sports Et de l'Amitié
Attendance: 2,504

3 November 2001
14:30

Rugby Roma (Italy)	17 - 22	(France) Narbonne
	Report

Stadio Tre Fontane
Attendance: 2,800

3 November 2001
15:00

Sale Sharks (England)	44 - 6	(Ireland) Connacht
	Report

Heywood Road
Attendance: 1,000

4 January 2002
20:00

Sale Sharks (England)	41 - 16	(France) Narbonne
	Report

Heywood Road
Attendance: 2,561

5 January 2002
14:30

Connacht (Ireland)	61 - 13	(Italy) Rugby Roma
	Report

Galway Sportsgrounds

12 January 2002
14:30

Rugby Roma (Italy)	17 - 62	(England) Sale Sharks
	Report

Stadio Tre Fontane

12 January 2002
19:30

Narbonne (France)	34 - 22	(Ireland) Connacht
	Report

Parc des Sports Et de l'Amitié

=== Pool 5 ===
Team	P	W	D	L	Tries for	Tries against	Try diff	Points for	Points against	Points diff	Pts
(England) Bristol Shoguns (6)	6	5	0	1	21	12	9	189	115	74	10
(Wales) Neath	6	4	0	2	16	13	3	160	131	29	8
(Italy) Viadana	6	2	0	4	13	25	−12	120	210	−90	4
(France) Bourgoin	6	1	0	5	19	19	0	160	173	−13	2
Source : www.ercrugby.com Points breakdown: *2 points for a win *1 point for a draw

29 September 2001
14:30

Neath (Wales)	41 - 14	(Italy) Viadana
	Report

The Gnoll
Attendance: 3,000

30 September 2001
15:00

Bourgoin (France)	28 - 34	(England) Bristol Shoguns
	Report

Stade Pierre Rajon
Attendance: 4,000

7 October 2001
14:30

Viadana (Italy)	26 - 10	(France) Bourgoin
	Report

Via Learco Guerra
Attendance: 1,000

7 October 2001
15:00

Bristol Shoguns (England)	10 - 6	(Wales) Neath
	Report

Memorial Stadium
Attendance: 3,006

27 October 2001
14:30

Neath (Wales)	27 - 20	(France) Bourgoin
	Report

The Gnoll
Attendance: 3,000

28 October 2001
14:30

Viadana (Italy)	16 - 42	(England) Bristol Shoguns
	Report

Via Learco Guerra
Attendance: 1,100

4 November 2001
15:00

Bourgoin (France)	25 - 27	(Wales) Neath
	Report

Stade Pierre Rajon

4 November 2001
15:00

Bristol Shoguns (England)	31 - 15	(Italy) Viadana
	Report

Memorial Stadium
Attendance: 2,543

5 January 2002
14:30

Neath (Wales)	33 - 29	(England) Bristol Shoguns
	Report

The Gnoll
Attendance: 4,500

5 January 2002
15:00

Bourgoin (France)	60 - 16	(Italy) Viadana
	Report

Stade Pierre Rajon
Attendance: 1,500

12 January 2002
14:30

Viadana (Italy)	33 - 26	(Wales) Neath
	Report

Via Learco Guerra

13 January 2002
15:00

Bristol Shoguns (England)	43 - 17	(France) Bourgoin
	Report

Memorial Stadium
Attendance: 2,695

=== Pool 6 ===
Team	P	W	D	L	Tries for	Tries against	Try diff	Points for	Points against	Points diff	Pts
(England) London Irish (5)	6	5	1	0	37	8	29	284	85	199	11
(France) Dax	6	4	1	1	42	9	33	306	119	187	9
(Italy) L'Aquila	6	2	0	4	11	34	−23	107	239	−132	4
(Spain) Valladolid RAC	6	0	0	6	7	46	−39	53	307	−254	0
Source : www.ercrugby.com Points breakdown: *2 points for a win *1 point for a draw

29 September 2001
15:00

L'Aquila (Italy)	25 - 14	(Spain) Valladolid RAC
	Report

Stadio Tommaso Fattori

29 September 2001
19:30

Dax (France)	22 - 29	(England) London Irish
	Report

Stade Maurice Boyau
Attendance: 4,000

7 October 2001
12:30

Valladolid RAC (Spain)	11 - 26	(France) Dax
	Report

Estadio Pepe Rojo
Attendance: 1,600

7 October 2001
15:00

London Irish (England)	48 - 12	(Italy) L'Aquila
	Report

Madejski Stadium
Attendance: 2,200

27 October 2001
15:00

L'Aquila (Italy)	29 - 41	(France) Dax
	Report

Stadio Tommaso Fattori

28 October 2001
12:30

Valladolid RAC (Spain)	5 - 71	(England) London Irish
	Report

Ciudad Universitaria
Attendance: 2,800

4 November 2001
15:00

Dax (France)	94 - 19	(Italy) L'Aquila
	Report

Stade Maurice Boyau
Attendance: 1,337

4 November 2001
15:00

London Irish (England)	76 - 10	(Spain) Valladolid RAC
	Report

Madejski Stadium
Attendance: 2,414

4 January 2002
19:00

L'Aquila (Italy)	8 - 32	(England) London Irish
	Report

Stadio Tommaso Fattori
Attendance: 400

6 January 2002
15:00

Dax (France)	95 - 3	(Spain) Valladolid RAC
	Report

Stade Maurice Boyau
Attendance: 4,000

13 January 2002
12:30

Valladolid RAC (Spain)	10 - 14	(Italy) L'Aquila
	Report

Ciudad Universitaria
Attendance: 1,300

13 January 2002
15:00

London Irish (England)	28 - 28	(France) Dax
	Report

Madejski Stadium
Attendance: 3,240

=== Pool 7 ===
Team	P	W	D	L	Tries for	Tries against	Try diff	Points for	Points against	Points diff	Pts
(England) Gloucester (2)	6	6	0	0	47	9	38	362	62	300	12
(France) La Rochelle	6	4	0	2	21	14	7	161	177	−16	8
(Wales) Caerphilly	6	2	0	4	18	38	−20	170	281	−111	4
(Italy) Gran Parma	6	0	0	6	11	36	−25	104	277	−173	0
Source : www.ercrugby.com Points breakdown: *2 points for a win *1 point for a draw

29 September 2001
14:30

Caerphilly (Wales)	41 - 30	(Italy) Gran Parma
	Report

Virginia Park
Attendance: 1,000

29 September 2001
15:00

Gloucester (England)	34 - 15	(France) La Rochelle
	Report

Kingsholm
Attendance: 7,000

6 October 2001
15:00

Gran Parma (Italy)	5 - 48	(England) Gloucester
	Report

Stadio Sergio Lanfranchi
Attendance: 1,000

6 October 2001
19:30

La Rochelle (France)	44 - 39	(Wales) Caerphilly
	Report

Stade Marcel-Deflandre

27 October 2001
15:00

Gloucester (England)	98 - 14	(Wales) Caerphilly
	Report

Kingsholm
Attendance: 7,336

27 October 2001
17:00

La Rochelle (France)	28 - 14	(Italy) Gran Parma
	Report

Stade Marcel-Deflandre
Attendance: 2,000

3 November 2001
14:30

Caerphilly (Wales)	16 - 47	(England) Gloucester
	Report

Virginia Park
Attendance: 3,500

3 November 2001
18:00

Gran Parma (Italy)	25 - 30	(France) La Rochelle
	Report

Stadio Sergio Lanfranchi
Attendance: 600

5 January 2002
14:30

Caerphilly (Wales)	29 - 32	(France) La Rochelle
	Report

Virginia Park

5 January 2002
15:00

Gloucester (England)	99 - 0	(Italy) Gran Parma
	Report

Kingsholm
Attendance: 6,567

12 January 2002
14:30

Gran Parma (Italy)	30 - 31	(Wales) Caerphilly
	Report

Stadio Sergio Lanfranchi
Attendance: 1,000

12 January 2002
19:30

La Rochelle (France)	12 - 36	(England) Gloucester
	Report

Stade Marcel-Deflandre
Attendance: 5,000

=== Pool 8 ===
Team	P	W	D	L	Tries for	Tries against	Try diff	Points for	Points against	Points diff	Pts
(England) Saracens (1)	6	6	0	0	64	7	57	435	66	369	12
(France) Bordeaux-Bègles	6	4	0	2	53	15	38	354	117	237	8
(Romania) Dinamo București	6	1	0	5	15	58	−43	102	403	−301	2
(Italy) Bologna	6	1	0	5	9	61	−52	93	398	−305	2
Source : www.ercrugby.com Points breakdown: *2 points for a win *1 point for a draw

29 September 2001
14:00

Dinamo București (Romania)	49 - 17	(Italy) Bologna
	Report

Complexul Cultural Sportiv
Attendance: 500

29 September 2001
14:00

Saracens (England)	34 - 14	(France) Bordeaux-Bègles
	Report

Vicarage Road
Attendance: 4,381

6 October 2001
14:00

Dinamo București (Romania)	12 - 75	(England) Saracens
	Report

Complexul Cultural Sportiv
Attendance: 2,000

6 October 2001
19:00

Bordeaux-Bègles (France)	89 - 11	(Italy) Bologna
	Report

Stade André Moga

28 October 2001
15:00

Bordeaux-Bègles (France)	82 - 23	(Romania) Dinamo București
	Report

Stade André Moga
Attendance: 5,473

28 October 2001
15:00

Saracens (England)	113 - 3	(Italy) Bologna
	Report

Vicarage Road
Attendance: 1,000

3 November 2001
14:00

Dinamo București (Romania)	5 - 83	(France) Bordeaux-Bègles
	Report

Complexul Cultural Sportiv
Attendance: 650

3 November 2001
15:00

Bologna (Italy)	10 - 75	(England) Saracens
	Report

Stadio Arcoveggio
Attendance: 1,200

5 January 2002
15:00

Bologna (Italy)	19 - 62	(France) Bordeaux-Bègles
	Report

Stadio Arcoveggio
Attendance: 150

6 January 2002
15:00

Saracens (England)	113 - 3	(Romania) Dinamo București
	Report

Vicarage Road
Attendance: 3,582

12 January 2002
15:00

Bologna (Italy)	33 - 10	(Romania) Dinamo București
	Report

Stadio Arcoveggio

12 January 2002
19:00

Bordeaux-Bègles (France)	24 - 25	(England) Saracens
	Report

Stade André Moga

== See also ==
- European Challenge Cup
- 2001–02 Heineken Cup
