= 2004–05 European Shield =

Tournament details
- Countries: England; France; Italy; Portugal; Romania; Spain
- Tournament format(s): Knockout
- Date: 4 December 2004 – 21 May 2005

Tournament statistics
- Teams: 16
- Matches played: 27
- Attendance: 38,717 (1,434 per match)
- Tries scored: 199 (7.37 per match)

Final
- Venue: Kassam Stadium, Oxford
- Attendance: 2,823
- Champions: (France) Auch (1st title)
- Runners-up: (England) Worcester Warriors

The 2004–05 European Shield (known as the Parker Pen Shield for sponsorship reasons) was the 3rd, and final, season of the European Shield, Europe's third-tier club rugby union competition below the Heineken Cup and European Challenge Cup. A total of 15 teams participated, representing six countries.

This competition was intended to be contested between 12 first round losers from the 2004–05 European Challenge Cup plus 4 other Clubs entering directly into the 1st Round. The structure of the competition was a purely knockout format; teams played each other on a home and away basis, with the aggregate points winner proceeding to the next round. The final was a single leg.

The competition began on 4 December 2004 and culminated in the final at Kassam Stadium in Oxford on 21 May 2005. Auch secured a victory over Worcester Warriors in the final and picked up their first piece of European Club silverware.

After this season, the European Challenge Cup reverted to its previous "pool and knockout" format and the European Shield was discontinued.

== Teams ==
This competition was intended to be contested between 12 first round losers from the 2004–05 European Challenge Cup, plus 4 other Clubs that joined directly at the 1st Round of the Shield. AA Coimbra subsequently declined to play in the competition.

England	France	Italy	Portugal	Romania	Spain
Leeds Tykes; Worcester Warriors	Auch; Bayonne	Catania; Gran Parma; L'Aquila; Leonessa; Petrarca Padova; Rovigo	AA Coimbra		Valladolid RAC
			Clube Rugby Lisboa	București	Bera Bera; UC Madrid

== Matches ==
=== Round 1 ===
==== 1st leg ====
4 December 2004
13:00

Rovigo (Italy)	3–48	(England) Worcester Warriors
	Report

Stadio Comunale Mario Battaglini
Attendance: 500
Referee: Jean-Luc Rebollal

4 December 2004
14:30

Petrarca Padova (Italy)	35–7	(Spain) Bera Bera
	Report

Stadio Plebiscito
Attendance: 200
Referee: Tim Hayes

4 December 2004
15:00

Catania (Italy)	12–39	(France) Bayonne
	Report

Stadio Santa Maria Goretti
Attendance: 1,500
Referee: Phil Fear

4 December 2004
15:00

Clube Rugby Lisboa (Portugal)	17–12	(Spain) UC Madrid
	Report

Tapada da Ajuda
Attendance: 474

4 December 2004
18:00

Auch (France)	48–6	(Italy) L'Aquila
	Report

Stade du Moulias
Attendance: 1,300

5 December 2004
13:00

București (Romania)	18–15	(Italy) Leonessa
	Report

Steaua Stadium
Attendance: 500

5 December 2004
14:30

Leeds Tykes (England)	121–0	(Spain) Valladolid RAC
	Report

Headingley Stadium
Attendance: 1,601
Referee: David Rosich

==== 2nd leg ====
10 December 2004
19:30

Leonessa (Italy)	32–21	(Romania) București
	Report

Campo Comunale di Rovato
Attendance: 850
Referee: Romain Poite

11 December 2004
14:00

Worcester Warriors (England)	67–14	(Italy) Rovigo
	Report

Sixways Stadium
Attendance: 3,076
Referee: Neil Ballard

11 December 2004
15:00

Bayonne (France)	41–0	(Italy) Catania
	Report

Stade Jean Dauger
Attendance: 2,000
Referee: George Clancy

11 December 2004
15:00

L'Aquila (Italy)	23–31	(France) Auch
	Report

Stadio Tommaso Fattori
Attendance: 600
Referee: Rob Debney

11 December 2004
16:30

Bera Bera (Spain)	17–36	(Italy) Petrarca Padova
	Report

Miniestadio de Anoeta
Attendance: 1,500
Referee: Colin Stanley

11 December 2004
17:00

UC Madrid (Spain)	40–26	(Portugal) Clube Rugby Lisboa
	Report

Campo Central Madrid
Attendance: 250
Referee: Mauro Dordolo

12 December 2004
12:30

Valladolid RAC (Spain)	11–53	(England) Leeds Tykes
	Report

Estadio Pepe Rojo
Attendance: 850
Referee: Maurizio Vancini

==== Aggregate Results ====
Proceed to Quarter-final	Match points	Aggregate score	Points margin	Eliminated from competition
Gran Parma (Italy)	walkover			(Portugal) AA Coimbra
Leeds Tykes (England)	4–0	174–11	163	(Spain) Valladolid RAC
Worcester Warriors (England)	4–0	115–17	98	(Italy) Rovigo
Bayonne (France)	4–0	80–12	68	(Italy) Catania
Auch (France)	4–0	79–29	50	(Italy) L'Aquila
Petrarca Padova (Italy)	4–0	71–24	47	(Spain) Bera Bera
UC Madrid (Spain)	2–2	52–43	9	(Portugal) Clube Rugby Lisboa
Leonessa (Italy)	2–2	47–39	8	(Romania) București

=== Quarter-finals ===
==== 1st leg ====
7 January 2005
19:00

Bayonne (France)	99–0	(Spain) UC Madrid
	Report

Stade Jean Dauger
Attendance: 1,500
Referee: George Clancy

7 January 2005
20:00

Worcester Warriors (England)	32–6	(Italy) Leonessa
	Report

Sixways Stadium
Attendance: 3,062
Referee: Romain Poite

8 January 2005
15:00

Auch (France)	50–12	(Italy) Gran Parma
	Report

Stade du Moulias
Attendance: 1,060
Referee: Phil Fear

9 January 2005
14:30

Leeds Tykes (England)	29–13	(Italy) Petrarca Padova
	Report

Headingley Stadium
Attendance: 1,067
Referee: Jean-Pierre Matheu

==== 2nd leg ====
14 January 2005
19:30

Leonessa (Italy)	12 – 28	(England) Worcester Warriors
	Report

Campo Comunale di Rovato
Attendance: 600
Referee: Malcolm Changleng (Scotland)

15 January 2005
14:00

Petrarca Padova (Italy)	9–57	(England) Leeds Tykes
	Report

Stadio Plebiscito
Attendance: 1,000
Referee: David Keane

15 January 2005
14:30

Gran Parma (Italy)	14–5	(France) Auch
	Report

Stadio Sergio Lanfranchi
Attendance: 200
Referee: Sean Davey

15 January 2005
16:00

UC Madrid (Spain)	3–108	(France) Bayonne
	Report

Campo Central Madrid
Attendance: 250
Referee: Stefano Mancini

==== Aggregate Results ====
Proceed to Semifinal	Match points	Aggregate score	Points margin	Eliminated from competition
Bayonne (France)	4–0	207–3	204	(Spain) UC Madrid
Leeds Tykes (England)	4–0	86–22	64	(Italy) Petrarca Padova
Worcester Warriors (England)	4–0	60–18	42	(Italy) Leonessa
Auch (France)	2–2	55–26	29	(Italy) Gran Parma

=== Semifinals ===
All kick off times are local.

==== 1st leg ====
1 April 2005
19:30

Bayonne (France)	23–21	(France) Auch
	Report

Stade Jean Dauger
Attendance: 600
Referee: Malcolm Changleng (Scotland)

2 April 2005
14:00

Worcester Warriors (England)	43–34	(England) Leeds Tykes
	Report

Sixways Stadium
Attendance: 4,204
Referee: Nigel Owens

==== 2nd leg ====
22 April 2005
20:00

Leeds Tykes (England)	30–30	(England) Worcester Warriors
	Report

Headingley Stadium
Attendance: 1,300
Referee: David Rosich

23 April 2005
18:00

Auch (France)	16–13	(France) Bayonne
	Report

Stade du Moulias
Attendance: 5,800
Referee: Wayne Barnes (England)

==== Aggregate Results ====
Proceed to Final	Match points	Aggregate score	Points margin	Eliminated from competition
Worcester Warriors (England)	3–1	73–64	9	(England) Leeds Tykes
Auch (France)	2–2	37–36	1	(France) Bayonne

=== Final ===
21 May 2005
17:00

Worcester Warriors (England)	10–23	(France) Auch
Try: O'Leary (1); Con: Hayes (1); Pen: Hayes (1)	Stats; Report	Try: Bastide (1); Patat (1); Con: Dambielle (2); Pen: Dambielle (3)

Kassam Stadium, Oxford
Attendance: 2,823
Referee: Carlo Damasco (Italy)

== See also ==
- 2004-05 Heineken Cup
- 2004-05 European Challenge Cup
- European Shield
