= 2004–05 European Challenge Cup =

2004-05 European Challenge Cup

Tournament details
- Countries: England; France; Ireland; Italy; Portugal; Scotland; Spain
- Tournament format(s): Knockout
- Date: 23 October 2004 – 21 May 2005

Tournament statistics
- Teams: 28
- Matches played: 57
- Attendance: 177,521 (3,114 per match)
- Tries scored: 360 (6.32 per match)
- Top point scorer(s): Paul Warwick (Connacht) (97 points)
- Top try scorer(s): Mark Cueto (Sale Sharks) (9 tries)

Final
- Venue: Kassam Stadium, Oxford
- Attendance: 7,230
- Champions: (England) Sale Sharks (2nd title)
- Runners-up: (France) Pau

The 2004–05 European Challenge Cup (known as the Parker Pen Challenge Cup for sponsorship reasons) was the ninth season of the European Challenge Cup, Europe's second-tier club rugby union competition below the Heineken Cup. A total of 28 teams participated, representing seven countries.

The competition began with a series of matches on 23 October 2004 and culminated in the final at the Kassam Stadium in Oxford on 21 May 2005.

As in the previous two seasons, the competition was organised in a knockout format. Teams played each other on a home and away basis, with the aggregate points winner proceeding to the next round. The final was a single leg. This was the final season with a pure knockout format; in subsequent seasons the competition reverted to a pool stage followed by a knockout.

For the third and final time, a third tier tournament was held - the European Shield. This was contested between the first round losers from the European Challenge Cup. As there were only 28 teams involved, the 2 "best" 1st Round losers were reprieved and proceeded to the 2nd Round.

The defending champions, England's NEC Harlequins, did not have a chance to defend their crown because they qualified to play in the Heineken Cup. Sale Sharks claimed a comfortable victory over Pau in the final and picked up their second piece of European Club silverware.

== Teams ==
The allocation of teams was as follows:

England: 5 teams — all teams from the Zurich Premiership that did not qualify for the 2004–05 Heineken Cup
France: 10 teams — all teams from the Top 16 that did not qualify for the Heineken Cup
Ireland: 1 team — the Irish team from the Celtic League that did not play in the Heineken Cup
Italy: 8 teams — all the teams from the Super 10 that did not qualify for the Heineken Cup
Portugal: 1 team
Scotland: 1 team — the Scottish team from the Celtic League that did not play in the Heineken Cup
Spain: 2 teams — drawn from the División de Honor de Rugby

England	France	Ireland	Italy	Portugal	Scotland	Spain
Leeds Tykes London Irish Sale Sharks Saracens Worcester Warriors	Agen Auch Bayonne Béziers Brive Clermont Auvergne Grenoble Montpellier Narbonne Pau	Connacht	Catania Gran Parma L'Aquila Leonessa Overmach Parma Petrarca Padova Rovigo Viadana	AA Coimbra	Borders	El Salvador Valladolid RAC

== Matches ==
All kickoff times are local to the match location.

=== Round 1 ===
==== 1st leg ====
23 October 2004
14:00

AA Coimbra (Portugal)	3 – 98	(Scotland) Borders
	Report

Estádio Municipal Sérgio Conceição
Attendance: 400

23 October 2004
14:00

Worcester Warriors (England)	29 – 15	(France) Brive
	Report

Sixways Stadium
Attendance: 4,036

23 October 2004
15:00

Gran Parma (Italy)	15 – 35	(France) Pau
	Report

Stadio Nando Capra
Attendance: 700

23 October 2004
15:00

L'Aquila (Italy)	27 – 50	(France) Agen
	Report

Stadio Tommaso Fattori
Attendance: 1,500

23 October 2004
15:30

Rovigo (Italy)	7 – 51	(France) Montpellier
	Report

Stadio Comunale Mario Battaglini
Attendance: 500

23 October 2004
16:00

Petrarca Padova (Italy)	24 – 57	(France) Béziers
	Report

Stadio Plebiscito
Attendance: 200

23 October 2004
16:30

Valladolid RAC (Spain)	3 – 88	(Italy) Viadana
	Report

Estadio Pepe Rojo
Attendance: 2,000

23 October 2004
18:00

Auch (France)	18 – 20	(England) London Irish
	Report

Stade Patrice Brocas
Attendance: 1,500

23 October 2004
19:00

Bayonne (France)	21 – 24	(England) Saracens
	Report

Stade Jean Dauger
Attendance: 3,800

23 October 2004
19:30

Grenoble (France)	9 – 9	(England) Leeds Tykes
	Report

Stade Lesdiguières
Attendance: 3,000

23 October 2004
19:30

Narbonne (France)	25 – 11	(Ireland) Connacht
	Report

Parc des Sports et de l'Amitié
Attendance: 3,000

23 October 2004
20:00

Leonessa (Italy)	0 – 65	(France) Clermont Auvergne
	Report

Campo Comunale di Rugby
Attendance: 400

24 October 2004
12:30

El Salvador (Spain)	36 – 12	(Italy) Overmach Parma
	Report

Estadio Pepe Rojo
Attendance: 1,500

24 October 2004
15:00

Catania (Italy)	22 – 31	(England) Sale Sharks
	Report

Stadio Santa Maria Goretti
Attendance: 2,000

==== 2nd leg ====
29 October 2004
19:30

Borders (Scotland)	107 – 3	(Portugal) AA Coimbra
	Report

Netherdale
Attendance: 1,450

29 October 2004
19:30

Montpellier (France)	59 – 3	(Italy) Rovigo
	Report

Stade Sabathé
Attendance: 1,500

29 October 2004
19:45

Saracens (England)	36 – 10	(France) Bayonne
	Report

Vicarage Road
Attendance: 4,906

29 October 2004
20:00

Leeds Tykes (England)	17 – 18	(France) Grenoble
	Report

Headingley Stadium
Attendance: 2,805

30 October 2004
14:30

Connacht (Ireland)	40 – 21	(France) Narbonne
	Report

Galway Sportsgrounds
Attendance: 2,000

30 October 2004
14:30

Overmach Parma (Italy)	36 – 10	(Spain) El Salvador
	Report

Stadio Sergio Lanfranchi
Attendance: 300

30 October 2004
15:00

Béziers (France)	69 – 18	(Italy) Petrarca Padova
	Report

Stade de la Méditerranée
Attendance: 800

30 October 2004
19:00

Pau (France)	31 – 22	(Italy) Gran Parma
	Report

Stade du Hameau
Attendance: 3,000

30 October 2004
19:30

Agen (France)	59 – 21	(Italy) L'Aquila
	Report

Stade Armandie
Attendance: 4,128

30 October 2004
19:30

Brive (France)	40 – 10	(England) Worcester Warriors
	Report

Stade Amédée-Domenech
Attendance: 5,100

30 October 2004
19:30

Clermont Auvergne (France)	51 – 6	(Italy) Leonessa
	Report

Stade Marcel-Michelin
Attendance: 6,000

30 October 2004
19:30

Viadana (Italy)	59 – 7	(Spain) Valladolid RAC
	Report

Stadio Luigi Zaffanella
Attendance: 500

31 October 2004
15:00

London Irish (England)	42 – 18	(France) Auch
	Report

Madejski Stadium
Attendance: 5,638

31 October 2004
15:00

Sale Sharks (England)	50 – 3	(Italy) Catania
	Report

Edgeley Park
Attendance: 5,126

==== Aggregate Results ====
Key to colours
14 winners and 2 best losers advance to 2nd Round.
12 other teams to Shield.

Winners	Match points	Aggregate score	Points margin	Losers
Borders (Scotland)	4 – 0	205 – 6	199	(Portugal) AA Coimbra
Viadana (Italy)	4 – 0	147 – 10	137	(Spain) Valladolid RAC
Clermont Auvergne (France)	4 – 0	116 – 6	110	(Italy) Leonessa
Montpellier (France)	4 – 0	110 – 10	100	(Italy) Rovigo
Béziers (France)	4 – 0	126 – 42	84	(Italy) Petrarca Padova
Agen (France)	4 – 0	109 – 48	61	(Italy) L'Aquila
Sale Sharks (England)	4 – 0	81 – 25	56	(Italy) Catania
Pau (France)	4 – 0	66 – 37	29	(France) Bayonne
Saracens (England)	4 – 0	60 – 31	29	(Italy) Gran Parma
London Irish (England)	4 – 0	62 – 36	26	(France) Auch
Grenoble (France)	3 – 1	27 – 26	1	(England) Leeds Tykes
Brive (France)	2 – 2	55 – 39	16	(England) Worcester Warriors
Connacht (Ireland)	2 – 2	51 – 46	5	(France) Narbonne
Overmach Parma (Italy)	2 – 2	48 – 46	2	(Spain) El Salvador

=== Round 2 ===
==== 1st leg ====
3 December 2004
19:30

Béziers (France)	12 – 27	(France) Grenoble
	Report

Stade de la Méditerranée
Attendance: 2,100

4 December 2004
14:30

Connacht (Ireland)	56 – 3	(France) Montpellier
	Report

Galway Sportsgrounds
Attendance: 2,200

4 December 2004
15:00

Overmach Parma (Italy)	19 – 18	(England) Saracens
	Report

Stadio Sergio Lanfranchi
Attendance: 800

4 December 2004
18:30

Narbonne (France)	15 – 33	(England) Sale Sharks
	Report

Parc des Sports et de l'Amitié
Attendance: 2,600

4 December 2004
19:00

Pau (France)	25 – 19	(England) London Irish
	Report

Stade du Hameau
Attendance: 3,000

4 December 2004
19:30

Agen (France)	23 – 15	(Italy) Viadana
	Report

Stade Armandie
Attendance: 3,000

4 December 2004
19:30

Brive (France)	57 – 6	(Spain) El Salvador
	Report

Stade Amédée-Domenech
Attendance: 6,329

5 December 2004
15:00

Clermont Auvergne (France)	44 – 14	(Scotland) Borders
	Report

Stade Marcel-Michelin
Attendance: 6,892

==== 2nd leg ====
10 December 2004
19:30

Grenoble (France)	38 – 26	(France) Béziers
	Report

Stade Lesdiguières
Attendance: 2,000

10 December 2004
19:30

Montpellier (France)	19 – 14	(Ireland) Connacht
	Report

Stade Sabathé
Attendance: 1,000

10 December 2004
19:45

Sale Sharks (England)	25 – 10	(France) Narbonne
	Report

Edgeley Park
Attendance: 5,854

11 December 2004
14:30

Viadana (Italy)	22 – 17	(France) Agen
	Report

Stadio Luigi Zaffanella
Attendance: 2,000

11 December 2004
16:30

El Salvador (Spain)	23 – 45	(France) Brive
	Report

Estadio Pepe Rojo
Attendance: 1,300

12 December 2004
14:00

Borders (Scotland)	23 – 34	(France) Clermont Auvergne
	Report

Netherdale
Attendance: 1,400

12 December 2004
14:30

London Irish (England)	19 – 16	(France) Pau
	Report

Madejski Stadium
Attendance: 5,391

12 December 2004
15:00

Saracens (England)	52 – 6	(Italy) Overmach Parma
	Report

Vicarage Road
Attendance: 5,391

==== Aggregate Results ====
Proceed to Quarter-final	Match points	Aggregate score	Points margin	Eliminated from competition
Brive (France)	4 – 0	102 – 29	73	(Spain) El Salvador
Clermont Auvergne (France)	4 – 0	78 – 37	41	(Scotland) Borders
Sale Sharks (England)	4 – 0	58 – 25	33	(France) Narbonne
Grenoble (France)	4 – 0	65 – 38	27	(France) Béziers
Connacht (Ireland)	2 – 2	70 – 22	48	(France) Montpellier
Saracens (England)	2 – 2	70 – 25	45	(Italy) Overmach Parma
Pau (France)	2 – 2	41 – 38	3	(England) London Irish
Agen (France)	2 – 2	40 – 37	3	(Italy) Viadana

=== Quarter-finals ===
==== 1st leg ====
7 January 2005
19:30

Grenoble (France)	21 – 26	(Ireland) Connacht
	Report

Stade Lesdiguières
Attendance: 2,700

7 January 2005
19:45

Sale Sharks (England)	34 – 18	(France) Agen
	Report

Edgeley Park
Attendance: 4,866

8 January 2005
19:30

Pau (France)	25 – 21	(France) Clermont Auvergne
	Report

Stade du Hameau
Attendance: 3,000

9 January 2005
15:00

Saracens (England)	19 – 6	(France) Brive
	Report

Vicarage Road
Attendance: 4,201

==== 2nd leg ====
14 January 2005
19:30

Clermont Auvergne (France)	26 – 25	(France) Pau
	Report

Stade Marcel-Michelin
Attendance: 5,222

15 January 2005
14:00

Connacht (Ireland)	19 – 3	(France) Grenoble
	Report

Galway Sportsgrounds
Attendance: 2,500

15 January 2005
19:30

Agen (France)	17 – 15	(England) Sale Sharks
	Report

Stade Armandie
Attendance: 3,500

16 January 2005
15:00

Brive (France)	31 – 16	(England) Saracens
	Report

Stade Amédée-Domenech
Attendance: 6,000

==== Aggregate Results ====
Proceed to Semi-final	Match points	Aggregate score	Points margin	Eliminated from competition
Connacht (Ireland)	4 – 0	45 – 24	21	(France) Grenoble
Sale Sharks (England)	2 – 2	49 – 35	14	(France) Agen
Pau (France)	2 – 2	50 – 47	3	(France) Clermont Auvergne
Brive (France)	2 – 2	37 – 35	2	(England) Saracens

=== Semi-finals ===
==== 1st leg ====
2 April 2005
13:00

Connacht (Ireland)	18 – 25	(England) Sale Sharks
	Report

Galway Sportsgrounds
Attendance: 5,800

3 April 2005
14:00

Pau (France)	37 – 16	(France) Brive
	Report

Stade du Hameau
Attendance: 2,000

==== 2nd leg ====
23 April 2005
19:15

Brive (France)	27 – 13	(France) Pau
	Report

Stade Amédée-Domenech
Attendance: 5,000

24 April 2005
13:00

Sale Sharks (England)	59 – 9	(Ireland) Connacht
	Report

Edgeley Park
Attendance: 6,456

==== Aggregate Results ====
Proceed to Final	Match points	Aggregate score	Points margin	Eliminated from competition
Sale Sharks (England)	4 – 0	84 – 27	57	(Ireland) Connacht
Pau (France)	2 – 2	50 – 43	7	(France) Brive

=== Final ===
21 May 2005
12:45

Sale Sharks (England)	27 – 3	(France) Pau
Try: Hodgson (2) 24' c, 68' m Titterrell 36' c Cueto 56' m Con: Hodgson (2/4); Pen: Hodgson (1) 3'	Report	Pen: Beauxis (1) 30'

Kassam Stadium, Oxford
Attendance: 7,230
Referee: Alan Lewis (Ireland)

== See also ==
- 2004-05 Heineken Cup
- European Challenge Cup
- 2004–05 European Shield
