= 2003–04 European Challenge Cup =

2003-04 Parker Pen Challenge Cup

Tournament details
- Countries: England; France; Ireland; Italy; Romania; Scotland; Spain
- Tournament format(s): Knockout
- Date: 5 December 2003 – 22 May 2004

Tournament statistics
- Teams: 28
- Matches played: 57
- Attendance: 225,213 (3,951 per match)
- Tries scored: 323 (5.67 per match)
- Top point scorer(s): Olly Barkley (Bath) (120 points)
- Top try scorer(s): Simon Danielli (Bath) (6 tries)

Final
- Venue: Madejski Stadium, Reading, Berkshire
- Attendance: 13,123
- Champions: (England) NEC Harlequins (2nd title)
- Runners-up: (France) Montferrand

The 2003–04 European Challenge Cup (known as the Parker Pen Challenge Cup for sponsorship reasons) was the 8th season of the European Challenge Cup, Europe's second-tier club rugby union competition below the Heineken Cup. A total of 28 teams participated, representing seven countries. This was the first year of the competition following the introduction of regional rugby union teams in Wales. With the reduction of Welsh teams from nine to five, and with all teams participating in the 2003-04 Heineken Cup, there were no Welsh teams in the 2003–04 Parker Pen Challenge Cup.

The competition began when Rotherham hosted Narbonne and Leonessa hosted Montferrand on 5 December 2003 and culminated in the final at the Madejski Stadium in Reading on 22 May 2004.

As in the previous season, the competition was organised in a knockout format. Teams played each other on a home and away basis, with the aggregate points winner proceeding to the next round. The final was a single leg. For the second time, a third tier tournament was held - the European Shield. This was contested between the first round losers from the European Challenge Cup. As there were only 28 teams involved, the 2 "best" 1st Round losers were reprieved and proceeded to the 2nd Round.

The defending champions, England's London Wasps, did not have a chance to defend their crown because they qualified to play in the Heineken Cup. NEC Harlequins claimed the narrowest of victories over Montferrand in the final and picked up their second piece of European Club silverware.

== Teams ==
The allocation of teams was as follows:

England: 6 teams — all teams from the Zurich Premiership that did not qualify for the 2003–04 Heineken Cup
France: 10 teams — all teams from the Top 16 that did not qualify for the Heineken Cup
Ireland: 1 team — the Irish team from the Celtic League that did not play in the Heineken Cup
Italy: 8 teams — all the teams from the Super 10 that did not qualify for the Heineken Cup
Scotland: 1 team — the Scottish team from the Celtic League that did not play in the Heineken Cup
Spain: 2 teams — drawn from the División de Honor de Rugby

England	France	Ireland	Italy	Scotland	Spain
Bath NEC Harlequins London Irish Newcastle Falcons Rotherham Saracens	Béziers Brive Castres Olympique Colomiers Grenoble Montauban Montferrand Montpellier Narbonne Pau	Connacht	Gran Parma L'Aquila Leonessa Overmach Parma Petrarca Padova Rugby Roma Rovigo Viadana	Glasgow	El Salvador Valladolid RAC

== Matches ==
All kickoff times are local to the match location.

=== Round 1 ===
==== 1st leg ====
5 December 2003
19:45

Rotherham (England)	10 – 17	(France) Narbonne
	Report

Millmoor
Attendance: 1,327

5 December 2003
20:00

Leonessa (Italy)	0 – 55	(France) Montferrand
	Report

Campo Comunale di Rugby
Attendance: 500

6 December 2003
12:30

Valladolid RAC (Spain)	10 – 71	(England) Newcastle Falcons
	Report

Estadio Pepe Rojo
Attendance: 3,000

6 December 2003
14:30

Rugby Roma (Italy)	13 – 45	(England) Saracens
	Report

Stadio Tre Fontane
Attendance: 512

6 December 2003
15:00

Gran Parma (Italy)	10 – 35	(France) Grenoble
	Report

Stadio Sergio Lanfranchi
Attendance: 800

6 December 2003
15:00

L'Aquila (Italy)	11 – 75	(England) Bath
	Report

Stade Tommaso Fattori
Attendance: 2,000

6 December 2003
15:00

Rovigo (Italy)	14 – 53	(France) Castres Olympique
	Report

Stadio Comunale Mario Battaglini
Attendance: 300

6 December 2003
18:00

Colomiers (France)	37 – 12	(Italy) Petrarca Padova
	Report

Stade Selery
Attendance: 2,500

6 December 2003
18:00

Montpellier (France)	11 – 30	(Scotland) Glasgow
	Report

Stade Sabathé
Attendance: 500

6 December 2003
19:30

Brive (France)	39 – 3	(Italy) Viadana
	Report

Stade Amédée-Domenech
Attendance: 3,000

7 December 2003
12:30

El Salvador (Spain)	18 – 31	(England) NEC Harlequins
	Report

Estadio Pepe Rojo
Attendance: 2,800

7 December 2003
13:30

Montauban (France)	30 – 26	(England) London Irish
	Report

North Power Stadium
Attendance: 1,600

7 December 2003
14:30

Overmach Parma (Italy)	28 – 33	(France) Pau
	Report

Stadio Sergio Lanfranchi
Attendance: 350

7 December 2003
15:00

Béziers (France)	10 – 18	(Ireland) Connacht
	Report

Stade de la Méditerranée
Attendance: 4,543

==== 2nd leg ====
12 December 2003
19:30

Glasgow (Scotland)	38 – 13	(France) Montpellier
	Report

Hughenden Stadium
Attendance: 1,622

12 December 2003
19:45

Narbonne (France)	35 – 13	(England) Rotherham
	Report

Parc des Sports et de l'Amitié
Attendance: 1,500

13 December 2003
14:00

Connacht (Ireland)	11 – 13	(France) Béziers
	Report

Galway Sportsgrounds
Attendance: 2,500

13 December 2003
14:15

Bath (England)	50 – 0	(Italy) L'Aquila
	Report

The Recreation Ground
Attendance: 8,707

13 December 2003
15:00

NEC Harlequins (England)	63 – 3	(Spain) El Salvador
	Report

The Stoop
Attendance: 6,341

13 December 2003
15:00

Petrarca Padova (Italy)	20 – 38	(France) Colomiers
	Report

Stadio Plebiscito
Attendance: 1,200

13 December 2003
17:00

Montferrand (France)	58 – 3	(Italy) Leonessa
	Report

Stade Marcel-Michelin
Attendance: 7,941

13 December 2003
18:00

Castres Olympique (France)	75 – 10	(Italy) Rovigo
	Report

Stade Pierre-Antoine
Attendance: 2,500

13 December 2003
19:00

Pau (France)	25 – 6	(Italy) Overmach Parma
	Report

Stade du Hameau
Attendance: 3,500

13 December 2003
19:30

Grenoble (France)	41 – 6	(Italy) Gran Parma
	Report

Stade Lesdiguières
Attendance: 4,087

14 December 2003
13:00

Newcastle Falcons (England)	66 – 27	(Spain) Valladolid RAC
	Report

Kingston Park
Attendance: 6,012

14 December 2003
14:30

Viadana (Italy)	38 – 22	(France) Brive
	Report

Stradey Park
Attendance: 1,000

14 December 2003
15:00

London Irish (England)	36 – 24	(France) Montauban
	Report

Madejski Stadium
Attendance: 5,265

14 December 2003
15:00

Saracens (England)	82 – 5	(Italy) Rugby Roma
	Report

Vicarage Road
Attendance: 4,181

==== Aggregate Results ====
Key to colours
14 winners and 2 best losers advance to 2nd Round.
12 other teams to Shield.

Winners	Match points	Aggregate score	Points margin	Losers
Bath (England)	4 – 0	125 – 11	114	(Italy) L'Aquila
Montferrand (France)	4 – 0	113 – 3	110	(Italy) Leonessa
Saracens (England)	4 – 0	127 – 18	109	(Italy) Rugby Roma
Castres Olympique (France)	4 – 0	128 – 24	104	(Italy) Rovigo
Newcastle Falcons (England)	4 – 0	137 – 37	100	(Spain) Valladolid RAC
NEC Harlequins (England)	4 – 0	94 – 21	73	(Spain) El Salvador
Grenoble (France)	4 – 0	76 – 16	60	(Italy) Gran Parma
Glasgow (Scotland)	4 – 0	68 – 24	44	(France) Montpellier
Colomiers (France)	4 – 0	75 – 32	43	(Italy) Petrarca Padova
Narbonne (France)	4 – 0	52 – 23	29	(England) Rotherham
Pau (France)	4 – 0	58 – 34	24	(Italy) Overmach Parma
Brive (France)	2 – 2	61 – 41	20	(Italy) Viadana
London Irish (England)	2 – 2	62 – 54	8	(France) Montauban
Connacht (Ireland)	2 – 2	29 – 23	6	(France) Béziers

=== Round 2 ===
==== 1st leg ====
10 January 2004
14:00

Connacht (Ireland)	29 – 7	(France) Pau
	Report

Galway Sportsgrounds
Attendance: 2,000

10 January 2004
19:30

Montauban (France)	8 – 43	(England) NEC Harlequins
	Report

Stadio Luigi Zaffanella
Attendance: 3,000

11 January 2004
14:30

Newcastle Falcons (England)	10 – 3	(France) Montferrand
	Report

Kingston Park
Attendance: 4,950

11 January 2004
15:00

Brive (France)	30 – 17	(France) Castres Olympique
	Report

Stade Amédée-Domenech
Attendance: 4,000

11 January 2004
15:00

Colomiers (France)	25 – 32	(England) Bath
	Report

Stade Selery
Attendance: 4,500

11 January 2004
15:00

Grenoble (France)	15 – 19	(France) Béziers
	Report

Stade Lesdiguières
Attendance: 4,500

11 January 2004
15:00

London Irish (England)	20 – 13	(France) Narbonne
	Report

Madejski Stadium
Attendance: 4,525

11 January 2004
15:00

Saracens (England)	37 – 6	(Scotland) Glasgow
	Report

Vicarage Road
Attendance: 3,653

==== 2nd leg ====
16 January 2004
19:30

Glasgow (Scotland)	33 – 5	(England) Saracens
	Report

Hughenden Stadium
Attendance: 2,645

17 January 2004
14:15

Bath (England)	26 – 17	(France) Colomiers
	Report

The Recreation Ground
Attendance: 9,980

17 January 2004
15:00

NEC Harlequins (England)	36 – 17	(France) Montauban
	Report

The Stoop
Attendance: 5,011

17 January 2004
19:00

Pau (France)	10 – 6	(Ireland) Connacht
	Report

Stade du Hameau
Attendance: 3,000

17 January 2004
19:30

Béziers (France)	24 – 8	(France) Grenoble
	Report

Stade de la Méditerranée
Attendance: 4,389

17 January 2004
19:30

Narbonne (France)	29 – 10	(England) London Irish
	Report

Parc des Sports et de l'Amitié
Attendance: 4,000

18 January 2004
15:00

Montferrand (France)	25 – 13	(England) Newcastle Falcons
	Report

Stade Marcel-Michelin
Attendance: 7,500

18 January 2004
15:00

Castres Olympique (France)	31 – 28	(France) Brive
	Report

Stade Pierre-Antoine
Attendance: 2,500

==== Aggregate Results ====
Proceed to Quarter-final	Match points	Aggregate score	Points margin	Eliminated from competition
NEC Harlequins (England)	4 – 0	79 – 25	54	(France) Montauban
Béziers (France)	4 – 0	43 – 23	20	(France) Grenoble
Bath (England)	4 – 0	58 – 42	16	(France) Colomiers
Connacht (Ireland)	2 – 2	35 – 17	18	(France) Pau
Narbonne (France)	2 – 2	42 – 30	12	(England) London Irish
Brive (France)	2 – 2	58 – 48	10	(France) Castres Olympique
Montferrand (France)	2 – 2	28 – 23	5	(England) Newcastle Falcons
Saracens (England)	2 – 2	42 – 39	3	(Scotland) Glasgow

=== Quarter-finals ===
==== 1st leg ====
24 January 2004
15:00

NEC Harlequins (England)	41 – 8	(France) Brive
	Report

The Stoop
Attendance: 4,950

24 January 2004
19:30

Béziers (France)	24 – 19	(England) Bath
	Report

Stade de la Méditerranée
Attendance: 2,553

24 January 2004
19:30

Narbonne (France)	18 – 27	(Ireland) Connacht
	Report

Parc des Sports et de l'Amitié
Attendance: 4,000

25 January 2004
15:00

Montferrand (France)	26 – 10	(England) Saracens
	Report

Stade Marcel-Michelin
Attendance: 9,444

==== 2nd leg ====
31 January 2004
14:00

Connacht (Ireland)	16 – 10	(France) Narbonne
	Report

Galway Sportsgrounds
Attendance: 2,000

31 January 2004
14:15

Bath (England)	26 – 7	(France) Béziers
	Report

The Recreation Ground
Attendance: 5,571

1 February 2004
15:00

Brive (France)	36 – 20	(England) NEC Harlequins
	Report

Stade Amédée-Domenech
Attendance: 5,000

1 February 2004
15:00

Saracens (England)	18 – 14	(France) Montferrand
	Report

Vicarage Road
Attendance: 4,058

==== Aggregate Results ====
Proceed to Semifinal	Match points	Aggregate score	Points margin	Eliminated from competition
Connacht (Ireland)	4 – 0	43 – 28	15	(France) Narbonne
NEC Harlequins (England)	2 – 2	61 – 44	17	(France) Brive
Bath (England)	2 – 2	45 – 31	14	(France) Béziers
Montferrand (France)	2 – 2	40 – 28	12	(England) Saracens

=== Semi-finals ===
==== 1st leg ====
10 April 2004
13:00

Bath (England)	29 – 15	(France) Montferrand
	Report

The Recreation Ground
Attendance: 7,700

11 April 2004
13:00

NEC Harlequins (England)	31 – 22	(Ireland) Connacht
	Report

The Stoop
Attendance: 6,573

==== 2nd leg ====
24 April 2004
14:00

Montferrand (France)	38 – 22	(England) Bath
	Report

Stade Marcel-Michelin
Attendance: 4,000

25 April 2004
13:00

Connacht (Ireland)	23 – 18	(England) NEC Harlequins
	Report

Galway Sportsgrounds
Attendance: 6,000

==== Aggregate Results ====
Proceed to Final	Match points	Aggregate score	Points margin	Eliminated from competition
NEC Harlequins (England)	2 – 2	49 – 45	4	(Ireland) Connacht
Montferrand (France)	2 – 2	53 – 51	2	(England) Bath

=== Final ===
22 May 2004
12:00

Montferrand (France)	26 – 27	(England) NEC Harlequins
Try: Azam; Mignoni; Con: Floch (2); Pen: Floch (3); Drop: Merceron (1)	Report	Try: Duffy; Keogh; Con: Dunne (1); Pen: Burke (4); Dunne (1)

Madejski Stadium, Reading, Berkshire
Attendance: 13,123
Referee: Nigel Whitehouse (Wales)

== See also ==
- 2003-04 Heineken Cup
- European Challenge Cup
- 2003–04 European Shield
