= 2002–03 European Shield =

Rugby competition

2002-03 European Shield

Tournament details
- Countries: France; Italy; Romania; Spain; Wales
- Tournament format(s): Knockout
- Date: 6 December 2002 - 25 May 2003

Tournament statistics
- Teams: 16
- Matches played: 29
- Attendance: 44,380 (1,530 per match)
- Tries scored: 182 (6.28 per match)

Final
- Venue: Madejski Stadium, Reading
- Attendance: 4,000
- Champions: (France) Castres Olympique (1st title)
- Runners-up: (Wales) Caerphilly

The 2002–03 European Shield (known as the Parker Pen Shield for sponsorship reasons) was the 1st season of the European Shield, Europe's third-tier club rugby union competition below the Heineken Cup and European Challenge Cup. A total of 16 teams participated, representing five countries.

This competition was contested between the first round losers from the 2002–03 European Challenge Cup. The structure of the competition was a purely knockout format; teams played each other on a home and away basis, with the aggregate points winner proceeding to the next round. The final was a single leg.

The competition began on 6 December 2002 and culminated in the final at the Madejski Stadium in Reading on 25 May 2003. Castres Olympique secured a victory over Caerphilly in the final and picked up their first piece of European Club silverware.

== Teams ==
This competition was contested between the 16 first round losers from the 2002–03 European Challenge Cup.

France	Italy	Romania	Spain	Wales
Castres Olympique; Grenoble; Mont de Marsan; Pau	Gran Parma; L'Aquila; Overmach Parma; Petrarca Padova; Rugby Roma; Rovigo; Rugby Silea	Dinamo București	La Moraleja; UC Madrid	Caerphilly; Ebbw Vale

== Matches ==
=== Round 1 ===
==== 1st leg ====
All kickoff times are local to the match location.

6 December 2002
19:30

Castres Olympique (France)	14 – 13	(France) Grenoble
	Report

Stade Pierre-Antoine
Attendance: 1,500
Referee: Giovanni Morandin (Italy)

7 December 2002
14:00

Ebbw Vale (Wales)	37 – 16	(Spain) UC Madrid
	Report

Eugene Cross Park
Attendance: 900
Referee: Antonio Lombardi (Italy)

7 December 2002
14:00

Gran Parma (Italy)	21 – 16	(France) Pau
	Report

Stadio Sergio Lanfranchi
Attendance: 1,000
Referee: Roy Maybank (England)

7 December 2002
14:30

Rovigo (Italy)	26 – 22	(Wales) Caerphilly
	Report

Stadio Comunale Mario Battaglini
Attendance: 450
Referee: Christophe Berdos (France)

7 December 2002
14:30

Rugby Roma (Italy)	18 – 38	(Italy) Petrarca Padova
	Report

Stadio Tre Fontane
Attendance: 700
Referee: Colin Saunders (Wales)

7 December 2002
16:30

La Moraleja (Spain)	26 – 19	(Italy) Overmach Parma
	Report

Pol. Municipal de Alcobendas
Attendance: 800
Referee: Gregg Davis (Scotland)

7 December 2002
19:00

Mont de Marsan (France)	17 – 7	(Italy) Rugby Silea
	Report

Stade Guy Boniface
Attendance: 2,306
Referee: Ashley Rowden (England)

8 December 2002
15:00

L'Aquila (Italy)	24 – 27	(Romania) Dinamo București
	Report

Stadio Tommaso Fattori
Attendance: 500
Referee: Franck Maciello (France)

==== 2nd leg ====
All kickoff times are local to the match location.

14 December 2002
14:30

Caerphilly (Wales)	58 – 17	(Italy) Rovigo
	Report

Virginia Park
Attendance: 650
Referee: Gregg Davies (Scotland)

14 December 2002
14:30

Petrarca Padova (Italy)	14 – 14	(Italy) Rugby Roma
	Report

Stadio Plebiscito
Attendance: 1,000
Referee: Tony Redmond (Ireland)

14 December 2002
15:00

Rugby Silea (Italy)	17 – 32	(France) Mont de Marsan
	Report

Stadio Comunale di Monigo
Attendance: 400
Referee: Keri Evans (Wales)

14 December 2002
15:30

UC Madrid (Spain)	16 – 38	(Wales) Ebbw Vale
	Report

Estadio Nacional ComplutenseCiudad Universitaria
Attendance: 350
Referee: Stefano Mancini (Italy)

14 December 2002
17:30

Grenoble (France)	30 – 31	(France) Castres Olympique
	Report

Stade Lesdiguières
Attendance: 4,000
Referee: David Changleng (Scotland)

14 December 2002
19:00

Overmach Parma (Italy)	26 – 13	(Spain) La Moraleja
	Report

Stadio Sergio Lanfranchi
Attendance: 750
Referee: Roy Maybank (England)

14 December 2002
19:00

Pau (France)	30 – 20	(Italy) Gran Parma
	Report

Stade du Hameau
Attendance: 4,000
Referee: Paul Adams (Wales)

15 December 2002
13:00

Dinamo București (Romania)	26 – 24	(Italy) L'Aquila
	Report

Complexul Cultural Sportiv
Attendance: 500
Referee: John Hogg (Scotland)

==== Aggregate Results ====
Proceed to Quarter-final	Match points	Aggregate score	Points margin	Eliminated from competition
Ebbw Vale (Wales)	4 – 0	75 – 32	43	(Spain) UC Madrid
Mont de Marsan (France)	4 – 0	49 – 24	25	(Italy) Rugby Silea
Dinamo București (Romania)	4 – 0	53 – 48	5	(Italy) L'Aquila
Castres Olympique (France)	4 – 0	45 – 43	2	(France) Grenoble
Petrarca Padova (Italy)	3 – 1	52 – 32	20	(Italy) Rugby Roma
Caerphilly (Wales)	2 – 2	80 – 43	37	(Italy) Rovigo
Overmach Parma (Italy)	2 – 2	45 – 39	6	(Spain) La Moraleja
Pau (France)	2 – 2	46 – 41	5	(Italy) Gran Parma

=== Quarter-finals ===
==== 1st leg ====
All kickoff times are local to the match location.

11 January 2003
14:00

Ebbw Vale (Wales)	29 – 3	(France) Pau
	Report

Eugene Cross Park
Attendance: 600
Referee: Steve Leyshon (England)

11 January 2003
14:30

Caerphilly (Wales)	41 – 28	(Italy) Overmach Parma
	Report

Virginia Park
Attendance: 650
Referee: Christophe Berdos (France)

11 January 2003
14:30

Petrarca Padova (Italy)	15 – 16	(France) Mont de Marsan
	Report

Stadio Plebiscito
Attendance: 600
Referee: David Changleng (Scotland)

12 January 2003

Dinamo București (Romania)	0 – 88	(France) Castres Olympique
	Report

Complexul Cultural Sportiv
Attendance: 700
Referee: Ashley Rowden (England)

==== 2nd leg ====
All kickoff times are local to the match location.

17 January 2003
18:30

Castres Olympique (France)	123 – 0	(Romania) Dinamo București
	Report

Stade Pierre-Antoine
Attendance: 350
Referee: Steve Leyshon (England)

18 January 2003
14:30

Overmach Parma (Italy)	15 – 10	(Wales) Caerphilly
	Report

Stadio Sergio Lanfranchi
Attendance: 300
Referee: Didier Mene (France)

18 January 2003
18:00

Mont de Marsan (France)	16 – 30	(Italy) Petrarca Padova
	Report

Stade Guy Boniface
Attendance: 2,000
Referee: Paul Adams (Wales)

18 January 2003
19:00

Pau (France)	63 – 17	(Wales) Ebbw Vale
	Report

Stade du Hameau
Attendance: 4,124
Referee: Andy Ireland (Scotland)

==== Aggregate Results ====
Proceed to Semifinal	Match points	Aggregate score	Points margin	Eliminated from competition
Castres Olympique (France)	4 – 0	211 – 0	211	(Romania) Dinamo București
Pau (France)	2 – 2	66 – 46	20	(Wales) Ebbw Vale
Petrarca Padova (Italy)	2 – 2	45 – 32	13	(France) Mont de Marsan
Caerphilly (Wales)	2 – 2	51 – 43	8	(Italy) Overmach Parma

=== Semifinals ===
==== 1st leg ====
All kickoff times are local to the match location.

11 April 2003
19:00

Castres Olympique (France)	54 – 25	(France) Pau
	Report

Stade Pierre-Antoine
Attendance: 2,500
Referee: Giulio De Santis (Italy)

12 April 2003
16:00

Petrarca Padova (Italy)	10 – 28	(Wales) Caerphilly
	Report

Stadio Plebiscito
Attendance: 4,000
Referee: Gregg Davies (Scotland)

==== 2nd leg ====
All kickoff times are local to the match location.

25 April 2003
19:30

Caerphilly (Wales)	26 – 33	(Italy) Petrarca Padova
	Report

Virginia Park
Attendance: 1,750
Referee: Eric Darrière (France)

26 April 2003
17:30

Pau (France)	26 – 24	(France) Castres Olympique
	Report

Stade du Hameau
Attendance: 3,000
Referee: Roy Maybank (England)

==== Aggregate Results ====
Proceed to Final	Match points	Aggregate score	Points margin	Eliminated from competition
Castres Olympique (France)	2 – 2	78 – 51	27	(France) Pau
Caerphilly (Wales)	2 – 2	54 – 43	11	(Italy) Petrarca Padova

=== Final ===
25 May 2003
13:00

Caerphilly (Wales)	12 – 40	(France) Castres Olympique
Try: Boobyer; El-Abd; Con: Thomas (1)	Report	Try: Roque; Forment (2); Spanghero; Arbo; Con: Teulet (3); Pen: Teulet (3)

Madejski Stadium, Reading, Berkshire
Attendance: 4,000
Referee: Donal Courtney (Ireland)

== See also ==
- 2002-03 Heineken Cup
- 2002-03 European Challenge Cup
- European Shield
