= Cristian Stoica =

- Born: Cristian Alexandru Stoica; 1 August 1976 (age 50) Bucharest, Romania
- Height: 1.88 m (6 ft 2 in)
- Weight: 103 kg (227 lb; 16.2 st)

Rugby union career
- Position: Centre
Youth career
- 1984–1989: Steaua
- 1990–1995: Pavia
Senior career
Years	Team	Apps	(Points)
1995–1996	Pavia		
1996–1997	Milan		
1997–2001	Narbonne		
2001–2002	Gloucester		
2002–2003	Castres	31	(30)
2003–2008	Montpellier	93	(75)
2009–2010	Mazamet	16	(5)
International career
Years	Team	Apps	(Points)
1997–2007	Italy	71	(55)

Cristian Alexandru Stoica, also known as Alessandro Stoica (born 1 August 1976, in Bucharest) is a Romanian-Italian retired rugby union footballer, who played as a centre.

== Career ==
Stoica played for the youth Steaua Bucharest team in his first years, from 1984/85 to 1988/89. He moved to Italy in 1989 with his family. He later became a naturalized Italian citizen. He played for CUS Pavia (1995/96), Amatori Rugby Milano (1996/97), in the National Championship of Excellence. He moved to France, where he would play for RC Narbonne (1997/01). He spent a season at Gloucester Rugby (2001/02), returning afterwards to France, where he played for Castres Olympique (2002/03), Montpellier Hérault (2003/08), where he won the European Shield in 2004, and SC Mazamet (2009/10), where he finished his career.

He had 71 caps for Italy, from 1997 to 2007, scoring 11 tries, 55 points on aggregate. He was called for the 1999 Rugby World Cup, playing in three games but without scoring. He was called once again for the 2003 Rugby World Cup, playing in three games.

He played in the Six Nations Championship from 2000 to 2006; he had 28 caps, with a try scored.

Stoica represented the Barbarians in three matches during his career.

== Honours ==
=== Club ===
Narbonne

- European Challenge Cup runner-up: 2000–01

Castres Olympique

- European Shield: 2002–03

Montpellier Hérault

- European Shield: 2003–04
