= Andrea Benatti =

Italian rugby union player

- Born: 8 November 1979 (age 47) Viadana, Lombardy, Italy
- Height: 1.90 m (6 ft 3 in)
- Weight: 95 kg (14 st 13 lb; 209 lb)

Rugby union career
- Position: Flanker
Youth career
- Viadana
Senior career
Years	Team	Apps	(Points)
2000–2010	Viadana	70	(25)
2010−2012	Aironi	8	(0)
- Correct as of 1 February 2020
2001−2003	Italy	5	(5)
- Correct as of 1 February 2020

Andrea Benatti (Italian pronunciation: [beˈnatti]; born 8 November 1979) is an Italian rugby union player who last played for Aironi in the Pro12 in Italy. Once considered a star prospect, Benatti sat out several games for the national team in reserve for Mauro Bergamasco. A strong tackler with good ball-carrying skills, he has won five caps for Italy.

== Personal life ==
On 2 December 2017, the two Benatti's children, Kim (aged 2) and Leonardo Zeus (aged 5) were murdered by his wife Antonella Barbieri.
