= Andrea Bronzini =

- Born: 29 June 1997 (age 29) Viadana, Italy
- Height: 1.83 m (6 ft 0 in)
- Weight: 90 kg (198 lb; 14 st 2 lb)
- Notable relative: Giorgio Bronzini (brother)

Rugby union career
- Position: Centre
- Current team: Calvisano
Youth career
- Viadana
Senior career
Years	Team	Apps	(Points)
2015−2016	F.I.R. Academy		
2016−2017	Viadana	14	(10)
2017−2019	Benetton	15	(5)
2018−2019	→Viadana	12	(5)
2019−2020	San Donà	11	(0)
2020−2023	Calvisano	50	(50)
2023	→Brothers Old Boys		
2023−	Viadana		
- Correct as of 16 May 2020
International career
Years	Team	Apps	(Points)
2016−2017	Italy Under 20	16	(10)
2018	Emerging Italy	3	(0)
- Correct as of 16 May 2020

Andrea Bronzini (Viadana, 29 June 1997) is an Italian rugby union player. His usual position is as a centre and he currently plays for Viadana in Serie A Elite.

In 2017–18 Pro14 and 2018–19 Pro14 seasons, he played for Benetton and until end of the season for Viadana. After the experience with San Donà in 2019, he played with Calvisano in Top10 from 2020−2021 to 2022−2023 season.

After playing for Italy Under 20, in 2016 and 2017, in 2018 Bronzini was named in the Emerging Italy squad for the World Rugby Nations Cup.
