= Rima Wakarua =

Italy international rugby union player

- Born: Rima Shane Wakarua-Noema; 25 April 1976 (age 50) Auckland, New Zealand

Rugby union career
- Position: Fly-half
Senior career
Years	Team	Apps	(Points)
1999–2005	Leonessa		
2005–2008	Gran Parma		
2008–2012	I Cavalieri	35	(471)
2012–2016	Unione Rugby Prato Sesto	57	(697)
Provincial / State sides
Years	Team	Apps	(Points)
1994–1999	North Harbour		
International career
Years	Team	Apps	(Points)
2003–2006	Italy	11	(99)
Coaching career
- Years: Team
- 2012–2016: Unione Rugby Prato Sesto

Rima Shane Wakarua-Noema (born 25 March 1976) is a former professional rugby union footballer and coach. He played as a fly-half for North Harbour in New Zealand before moving to Italy in 1999, where he played for Leonessa, Gran Parma, I Cavalieri and Unione Rugby Prato Sesto. During his time there, he became a naturalised citizen and was called up to the Italy national team for the 2003 Rugby World Cup.

== Biography ==
Born in Auckland, New Zealand, to a New Zealand father and a Scottish mother, Wakarua is a naturalised Italian, having moved there in 1999. He was brought into the Italy squad for the 2003 Rugby World Cup having only played in the second tier of the Italian league and had not even been involved in squad get-togethers. His performance with the boot saw Italy overcome Canada in Canberra. He has 11 caps and has scored 99 points for Italy.
