= Hohneck =

Hohneck may refer to:

== Places ==
- Hohneck, unincorporated community of Kansas, United States
- Hohneck (Vosges), mountain of the Vosges, France

== People with the surname ==
- Josh Hohneck, New Zealand rugby union player
- Sean Hohneck, New Zealand rugby union player
