= Siaosi Vaili =

Samoa international rugby union player

- Born: 7 September 1977 (age 49) Apia, Samoa
- Height: 6 ft 5 in (1.96 m)
- Weight: 246 lb (112 kg)

Rugby union career
- Position: Flanker
Amateur team(s)
Years	Team	Apps	(Points)
- Manurewa
-2003	Ponsonby RFC		
Senior career
Years	Team	Apps	(Points)
2003–2004	Exeter Chiefs		
2004–2006	Worcester Warriors	27	(20)
2006–2007	Viadana Rugby		
Provincial / State sides
Years	Team	Apps	(Points)
2000	Counties Manukau	1	(5)
2002	Hawkes Bay	1	(0)
International career
Years	Team	Apps	(Points)
2001–2004	Samoa	10	(0)

Siaosi Vaili (born 7 September 1977) is a Samoan former rugby union player. He played as a flanker.

== Career ==
Vaili was born in Apia, Western Samoa. He moved to New Zealand playing for the provincial teams of Counties Manukau and Hawke's Bay. In the summer of 2003, he arrived in Europe, playing for the Exeter Chiefs, in the English second division. A season later, Vaili joined Worcester Warriors in the English Premiership, where he stayed for two seasons until 2006; and a year later, for Viadana Rugby, with which he won the 2006-07 Coppa Italia.

== International career ==
He first played for Samoa in a test match against Ireland, at Lansdowne Road, on 11 November 2001, during the Samoa tour of Europe in 2001. He was part of the 2003 Rugby World Cup roster, playing only the match against Georgia. His last international cap was against Fiji, at Suva, on 12 June 2004.
