= Ratko Jelic =

Serbian rugby union player (born 2000)

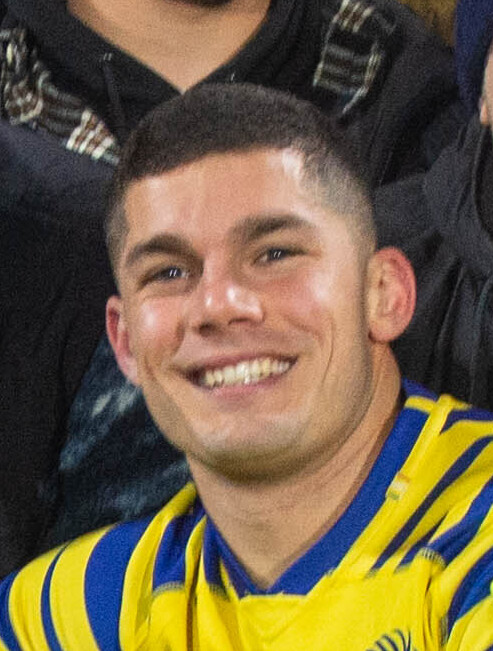
- Jelic in 2023
- Born: Ratko Jelic; 17 August 2000 (age 26) Belgrade, Serbia, FR Yugoslavia
- Height: 1.72 m (5 ft 7 1/2 in)
- Weight: 74 kg (11.7 st; 163 lb)

Rugby union career
- Position: Scrum-half
- Current team: Viadana
Youth career
- Rugby Jesi '70
- 2014−2017: Pesaro Rugby
- 2016−2018: F.I.R. Academy
- 2017−2018: Granducato Rugby
Senior career
Years	Team	Apps	(Points)
2018–2020	F.I.R. Academy		
2020–2022	Viadana	31	(52)
2022−2025	Zebre Parma	16	(0)
2024−2025	→Colorno		
2025−	Viadana		
- Correct as of 11 Jul 2025
National sevens team
Years	Team		Comps
2021–	Italy Sevens		2

Ratko Jelic (born August 17, 2000) is a Serbian born Italian rugby union player, currently playing for Viadana in Serie A Elite. His preferred position is scrum-half.

== Career ==
He joined with Viadana from 2020 to 2022. He moved to Zebre Parma as a permit player for the latter stages of the 2021–22 United Rugby Championship although didn't make an appearance. He made his debut in Round 7 of the 2022–23 season against the Dragons. He played with Zebre Parma until 2025.

On 30 November 2023, he was called in Italy Under 23 squad for test series against IRFU Combined Academies.

In 2021, Jelic was named in Italy Sevens squad for the annual Rugby Europe Sevens.

After moving on loan to Colorno for the end of the 2024-25 season, in July 2025, he left Zebre to move back to Viadana in Serie A Elite.
