= Donal Courtney (rugby union) =

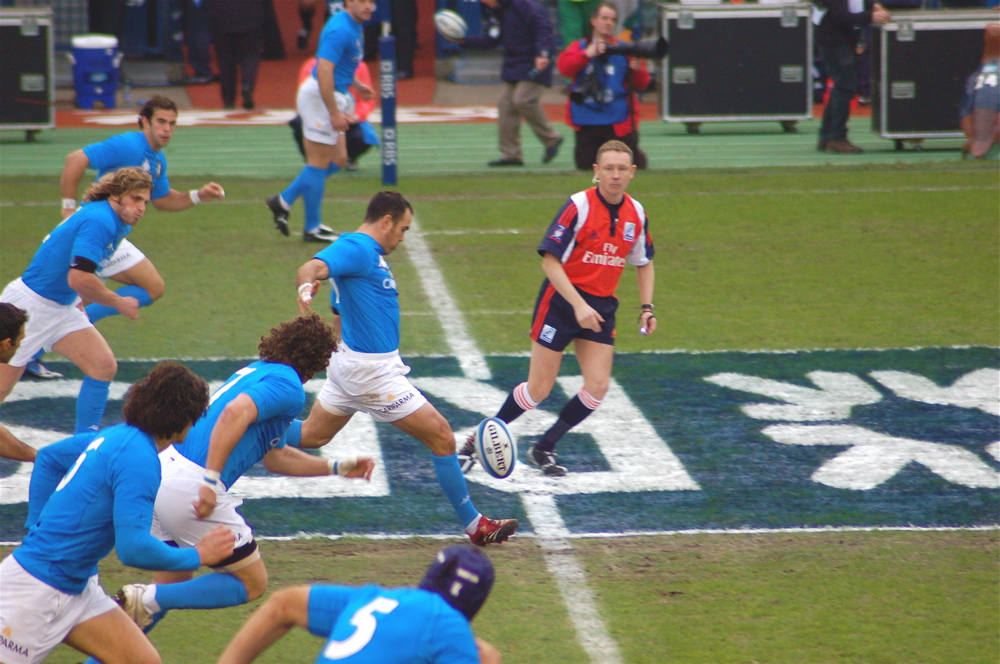
- Courtney (far right) during a kickoff in 2007
- Born: Donal Gerard Courtney; 22 May 1964 (age 62) Dublin, Ireland
- School: CBC Monkstown
- University: Trinity College, Dublin
- Occupation: Chartered accountant

Rugby union career
- Position: Wing
Senior career
| Years | Team | Apps | (Points) |
| 198x–1990 | Monkstown | | |
Refereeing career
| Years | Competition | | Apps |
| 199x–200x | All-Ireland League | | |
| 2001–2007 | Celtic League | | |
| 2001 | Under 21 Rugby World Championship | | |
| 2000–2007 | European competitions | | 44 |
- → European Rugby Challenge Cup
- → Heineken Cup
- → Parker Pen Shield
| 2002–2007 | Test Matches | | 20 |
| 2002–2007 | → Rugby World Cup qualifiers | | 7 |
| 2004–2007 | → Six Nations Championship | | 3 |
| 2004 | → Tri Nations | | 1 |

Donal Gerard Courtney is a former Irish rugby union referee. He served as a referee in the Celtic League, the Heineken Cup, the European Rugby Challenge Cup, the Six Nations Championship and the Tri Nations. Courtney refereed the 2002–03 Parker Pen Shield final. Between 2009 and 2016 he served as the ERC/EPCR match officials performance manager.

== Early life ==
Courtney was educated at CBC Monkstown and Trinity College, Dublin. He played rugby union for Monkstown until a serious shoulder injury ended his career in 1990. He is a fellow of the Institute of Chartered Accountants in Ireland. In addition to working as a rugby union referee, Courtney also served as the chief financial officer for the General Motors/Capmark Europe Bank. Courtney lives in Blackrock, Dublin.

== Refereeing career ==
=== Early years ===
Courtney first began refereeing in the 1990s. He was attending a tournament organised by Old Belvedere when a tannoy announcer asked "is there a referee in the house?". Courtney answered the call and subsequently refereed junior matches before working his way up to All-Ireland League level. Courtney would also referee in the Celtic League.

=== European competitions ===
In 2000 Courtney began refereeing in the Heineken Cup and the European Rugby Challenge Cup. On 25 May 2003 he refereed the 2002–03 Parker Pen Shield final between Caerphilly and Castres Olympique. Courtney refereed 44 European club games.

=== Early internationals ===
Courtney refereed at the 2001 Under 21 Rugby World Championship and then began refereeing A internationals during 2001 and 2002. He made his senior international refereeing debut on 7 September 2002 when he took charge of a 2003 Rugby World Cup qualifier between Uruguay and Chile. During his career, Courtney would referee a further six Rugby World Cup qualifiers. He also served as a touch judge at the 2003 Rugby World Cup.

=== Six Nations Championship ===
Between 2004 and 2007, Courtney refereed three matches in the Six Nations Championship. He made his Six Nations debut on 14 February 2004 when he took charge of a match between Wales and Scotland. On 19 March 2005 he refereed a match between Italy and France. In addition to refereeing, Courtney also served as a television match official and touch judge in the Six Nations. During the 2007 Six Nations Championship Courtney officiated at three of Scotland's matches. On 3 February 2007 he served as the TMO during the match between England and Scotland. He confirmed a try for England's Jonny Wilkinson despite video footage clearly showing that Wilkinson's foot had been in touch. At a post-match press conference, Scotland's coach, Frank Hadden, heavily criticised Courtney for his decision. On 17 March 2007 during the match between France and Scotland he served as a touch judge for Craig Joubert. During the match Courtney mistook Sean Lamont for his brother Rory Lamont following a yellow card offence. As a result, the wrong Lamont brother was sin-bined. On 24 February 2007 Courtney refereed his final Six Nations fixture, the match between Scotland and Italy at Murrayfield Stadium. Italy won 37–21, their first away win in the Six Nations.

=== List of internationals ===
Sources credit Courtney with refereeing between 20 and 24 Test Matches. This list may be incomplete.

| | Date | Competition | Home | Result | Away | Venue |
|---|---|---|---|---|---|---|
| 1 | 7 September 2002 | 2003 Rugby World Cup qualifier | Uruguay | 34–23 | Chile | Montevideo |
| 2 | 28 September 2002 | 2003 Rugby World Cup qualifier | Italy | 25–17 | Romania | Parma |
| 3 | 15 March 2003 | 2003 Rugby World Cup qualifier | Spain | 33-16 | Tunisia | Valence d'Agen, France |
| 4 | 12 April 2003 | 2003 Rugby World Cup qualifier | Spain | 13–62 | United States | Madrid, Spain |
| 5 | 27 April 2003 | 2003 Rugby World Cup qualifier | United States | 58–13 | Spain | Fort Lauderdale, Florida |
| 6 | 23 August 2003 | 2003 Rugby World Cup warm-up matches | Scotland | 47–15 | Italy | Murrayfield Stadium |
| 7 | 14 February 2004 | 2004 Six Nations Championship | Wales | 23–10 | Scotland | Millennium Stadium |
| 8 | 12 June 2004 | Wales tour | Argentina | 50–44 | Wales | Estadio Arquitecto Ricardo Etcheverry |
| 9 | 19 June 2004 | Wales tour | Argentina | 20–35 | Wales | José Amalfitani Stadium |
| 10 | 14 August 2004 | 2004 Tri Nations Series ^{[Note 1]} | South Africa | 40-26 | New Zealand | Ellis Park Stadium |
| 11 | 20 November 2004 | Japan tour | Romania | 25–10 | Japan | Stadionul Arcul de Triumf |
| 12 | 19 March 2005 | 2005 Six Nations Championship | Italy | 13–56 | France | Stadio Flaminio |
| 13 | 11 June 2005 | Summer Internationals | South Africa | 134–3 | Uruguay | Kings Park Stadium |
| 14 | 25 June 2005 | France tour | South Africa | 27–13 | France | EPRU Stadium |
| 15 | 28 May 2006 | Barbarians tour | England | 46–19 | Barbarians | Twickenham Stadium |
| 16 | 10 June 2006 | Scotland tour | South Africa | 36–16 | Scotland | Kings Park Stadium |
| 17 | 7 October 2006 | 2007 Rugby World Cup qualifier | Italy | 83–0 | Portugal | Stadio T.Fattori, L'Aquila |
| 18 | 25 November 2006 | Australia tour | Scotland | 15–44 | Australia | Murrayfield Stadium |
| 19 | 24 February 2007 | 2007 Six Nations Championship | Scotland | 17–37 | Italy | Murrayfield Stadium |
| 20 | March 2007 | 2007 Rugby World Cup qualifier | Portugal | | Uruguay | |

Notes

- ^1 The original referee, Nigel Williams (Wales), pulled a muscle after 12 minutes and was replaced by Courtney.

=== Later years ===
In April 2007 Courtney retired as a referee and touch judge. In May 2009 he was appointed the European Rugby Cup match officials performance manager. Courtney continued in the same role with the European Professional Club Rugby before leaving the position in May 2016. He remains involved in refereeing, serving as a performance reviewer and sitting on disciplinary panels.
