= 2001–02 European Challenge Cup =

2001–02 Parker Pen Shield

Tournament details
- Countries: England; France; Ireland; Italy; Romania; Spain; Wales
- Tournament format(s): Round-robin and Knockout
- Date: 28 September 2001 - 26 May 2002

Tournament statistics
- Teams: 32
- Matches played: 103
- Attendance: 236,307 (2,294 per match)
- Tries scored: 709 (6.88 per match)
- Top point scorer(s): Ludovic Mercier (Gloucester) (112 points)
- Top try scorer(s): Alexandre Bouyssie (Bordeaux-Bègles); Darragh O'Mahony (Saracens) (9 tries)

Final
- Venue: Kassam Stadium, Oxford
- Attendance: 12,000
- Champions: (England) Sale Sharks (1st title)
- Runners-up: (Wales) Pontypridd

The 2001–02 European Challenge Cup (known as the Parker Pen Shield for sponsorship reasons) was the 6th season of the European Challenge Cup, Europe's second-tier club rugby union competition below the Heineken Cup. A total of 32 teams participated, representing seven countries.

The pool stage began when Connacht hosted Narbonne on 28 September 2001 and ended with four matches on 13 January 2002. The knockout stages followed, culminating in the final at the Kassam Stadium in Oxford on 26 May 2002.

The defending champions, Englands's Harlequins, did not have a chance to defend their crown because they qualified to play in the Heineken Cup. Sale Sharks claimed a narrow victory over Pontypridd in the final and picked up their first piece of European Club silverware.

== Teams ==
The allocation of teams was as follows:

England: 6 teams — all teams from the Zurich Premiership that did not qualify for the 2001–02 Heineken Cup
France: 10 teams — all teams from the Top 16 that did not qualify for the Heineken Cup
Ireland: 1 team — the Irish team from the Celtic League that did not play in the Heineken Cup
Italy: 8 teams — all the teams from the Super 10 that did not qualify for the Heineken Cup
Romania: 1 team specially created for the competition
Spain: 2 teams — drawn from the División de Honor de Rugby
Wales: 4 teams — all the teams from the Celtic League that did not qualify for the Heineken Cup

Scotland was not represented as both of its teams (Edinburgh and Glasgow) played in the Heineken Cup.

England	France	Ireland	Italy	Romania	Spain	Wales
Bristol Shoguns Gloucester Leeds Tykes London Irish Sale Sharks Saracens	Agen Béziers Bordeaux-Bègles Bourgoin Colomiers Dax La Rochelle Montauban Narbonne Pau	Connacht	Bologna Gran Parma L'Aquila Overmach Parma Petrarca Padova Rugby Roma Rovigo Viadana	Dinamo București	UC Madrid Valladolid RAC	Caerphilly Ebbw Vale Neath Pontypridd

== Pool stage ==
Key to colours
Winner of each pool, advance to quarterfinals. Seed # in parentheses

=== Pool 1 ===
Team	P	W	D	L	Tries for	Tries against	Try diff	Points for	Points against	Points diff	Pts
(Wales) Ebbw Vale (7)	6	4	0	2	15	10	5	153	90	63	8
(France) Agen	6	4	0	2	25	13	12	199	119	80	8
(France) Montauban	6	4	0	2	16	9	7	146	123	23	8
(Italy) Rovigo	6	0	0	6	8	32	−24	78	244	−166	0
Source : www.ercrugby.com Points breakdown: *2 points for a win *1 point for a draw
Ebbw Vale, Agen and Montauban finished on the same Competition Points. In head-to-head matches Ebbw Vale beat Agen 68–30 on aggregate, having won one game and lost the other Ebbw Vale beat Montauban 31–24 on aggregate, having won one game and lost the other Agen beat Montauban 60–41 on aggregate, having won one game and lost the other hence Ebbw Vale top the table

=== Pool 2 ===
Team	P	W	D	L	Tries for	Tries against	Try diff	Points for	Points against	Points diff	Pts
(France) Pau (4)	6	6	0	0	27	3	24	217	63	154	12
(France) Colomiers	6	4	0	2	32	9	23	259	105	154	8
(Italy) Petrarca Padova	6	2	0	4	14	26	−12	114	223	−109	4
(Spain) UC Madrid	6	0	0	6	8	43	−35	90	289	−199	0
Source : www.ercrugby.com Points breakdown: *2 points for a win *1 point for a draw

=== Pool 3 ===
Team	P	W	D	L	Tries for	Tries against	Try diff	Points for	Points against	Points diff	Pts
(Wales) Pontypridd (8)	6	4	0	2	12	7	5	139	87	52	8
(England) Leeds Tykes	6	4	0	2	21	15	6	188	154	34	8
(France) Béziers	6	2	0	4	15	19	−4	136	187	−51	4
(Italy) Overmach Parma	6	2	0	4	11	18	−7	127	162	−35	4
Source : www.ercrugby.com Points breakdown: *2 points for a win *1 point for a draw
Pontypridd and Leeds finished on the same Competition Points. In head-to-head matches, Pontypridd beat Leeds 55–46 on aggregate, having won one game and lost the other.
Béziers and Overmach Parma finished on the same Competition Points. In head-to-head matches, Béziers beat Overmach Parma 63–60 on aggregate, having won one game and lost the other.

=== Pool 4 ===
Team	P	W	D	L	Tries for	Tries against	Try diff	Points for	Points against	Points diff	Pts
(England) Sale Sharks (3)	6	6	0	0	40	7	33	286	79	207	12
(Ireland) Connacht	6	3	0	3	15	17	−2	157	140	17	6
(France) Narbonne	6	3	0	3	13	9	4	128	111	17	6
(Italy) Rugby Roma	6	0	0	6	7	42	−35	57	298	−241	0
Source : www.ercrugby.com Points breakdown: *2 points for a win *1 point for a draw

=== Pool 5 ===
Team	P	W	D	L	Tries for	Tries against	Try diff	Points for	Points against	Points diff	Pts
(England) Bristol Shoguns (6)	6	5	0	1	21	12	9	189	115	74	10
(Wales) Neath	6	4	0	2	16	13	3	160	131	29	8
(Italy) Viadana	6	2	0	4	13	25	−12	120	210	−90	4
(France) Bourgoin	6	1	0	5	19	19	0	160	173	−13	2
Source : www.ercrugby.com Points breakdown: *2 points for a win *1 point for a draw

=== Pool 6 ===
Team	P	W	D	L	Tries for	Tries against	Try diff	Points for	Points against	Points diff	Pts
(England) London Irish (5)	6	5	1	0	37	8	29	284	85	199	11
(France) Dax	6	4	1	1	42	9	33	306	119	187	9
(Italy) L'Aquila	6	2	0	4	11	34	−23	107	239	−132	4
(Spain) Valladolid RAC	6	0	0	6	7	46	−39	53	307	−254	0
Source : www.ercrugby.com Points breakdown: *2 points for a win *1 point for a draw

=== Pool 7 ===
Team	P	W	D	L	Tries for	Tries against	Try diff	Points for	Points against	Points diff	Pts
(England) Gloucester (2)	6	6	0	0	47	9	38	362	62	300	12
(France) La Rochelle	6	4	0	2	21	14	7	161	177	−16	8
(Wales) Caerphilly	6	2	0	4	18	38	−20	170	281	−111	4
(Italy) Gran Parma	6	0	0	6	11	36	−25	104	277	−173	0
Source : www.ercrugby.com Points breakdown: *2 points for a win *1 point for a draw

=== Pool 8 ===
Team	P	W	D	L	Tries for	Tries against	Try diff	Points for	Points against	Points diff	Pts
(England) Saracens (1)	6	6	0	0	64	7	57	435	66	369	12
(France) Bordeaux-Bègles	6	4	0	2	53	15	38	354	117	237	8
(Romania) Dinamo București	6	1	0	5	15	58	−43	102	403	−301	2
(Italy) Bologna	6	1	0	5	9	61	−52	93	398	−305	2
Source : www.ercrugby.com Points breakdown: *2 points for a win *1 point for a draw

== Seeding ==
Seed	Pool Winners	Pts	TF	+/-
1	(England) Saracens	12	64	+369
2	(England) Gloucester	12	47	+300
3	(England) Sale Sharks	12	40	+207
4	(France) Pau	12	27	+154
5	(England) London Irish	11	37	+199
6	(England) Bristol Shoguns	10	21	+74
7	(Wales) Ebbw Vale	8	15	+63
8	(Wales) Pontypridd	8	12	+52

== Knockout stage ==
All kickoff times are local to the match location.

=== Quarter-finals ===
25 January 2002
19:05

Gloucester (England)	46–11	(Wales) Ebbw Vale
	Report

Kingsholm
Attendance: 6,816

25 January 2002
19:30

Sale Sharks (England)	25–20	(England) Bristol Shoguns
	Report

Heywood Road
Attendance: 3,607

26 January 2002
19:30

Pau (France)	9–38	(England) London Irish
	Report

Stade du Hameau
Attendance: 8,000

27 January 2002
15:00

Saracens (England)	15–17	(Wales) Pontypridd
	Report

Vicarage Road
Attendance: 4,604

=== Semi-finals ===
27 April 2002
17:30

London Irish (England)	27–33	(Wales) Pontypridd
	Report

Kassam Stadium
Attendance: 7,882

28 April 2002
14:00

Gloucester (England)	27–28	(England) Sale Sharks
	Report

Franklin's Gardens
Attendance: 5,785

=== Final ===
26 May 2002
14:00

Pontypridd (Wales)	22–25	(England) Sale Sharks
	Report

Kassam Stadium
Attendance: 12,000

== See also ==
- European Challenge Cup
- 2001-02 Heineken Cup
