= Sandro Ceppolino =

Alessandro Diego Ceppolino, known as Sandro Ceppolino (born 8 August 1974 in Villa Ballester), is a former Argentine-born Italian rugby union player and a current coach. He played as a centre.

Ceppolino played at Universitário de Córdoba, in Argentina, when he was assigned to Piacenza Rugby Club, where he would play from 1997/98 to 2000/01. He moved to Rugby Viadana in 2001/02, where he would stay until 2005/06, when he finished his career, aged 31 years old. He won the title of the Italian Championship in 2001/02 and the Cup of Italy in 2002/03.

Ceppolino had 5 caps for Italy in 1999, scoring 1 try, 5 points in aggregate. He was present at the 1999 Rugby World Cup, playing two games. He was not called again for the National Team since then.

Since 2008, he is the coach of the U-15 category at Volpiano Rugby.
