= Sean Hohneck =

- Born: 8 January 1979 (age 47) Rotorua, New Zealand
- Height: 6 ft 8 in (2.03 m)
- Weight: 258 lb (117 kg; 18.4 st)

Rugby union career
- Position: Lock
Senior career
| Years | Team | Apps | (Points) |
| 2006-2008 | Bristol | 26 | (0) |
| 2010-2011 | Leeds Carnegie | 9 | (0) |
Provincial / State sides
| Years | Team | Apps | (Points) |
| 2001- | Waikato | 35 | (5) |
Super Rugby
| Years | Team | Apps | (Points) |
| 2004 | Chiefs | 17 | (0) |
International career
| Years | Team | Apps | (Points) |
| 2004-2005 | NZ Māori | | |

Sean Hohneck (born 8 January 1979 in Rotorua, New Zealand) is a rugby union player for Leeds Carnegie He previously played for Rugby Viadana, playing at lock.

Hohneck joined Leeds Carnegie for the 2010-11 RFU Championship.

He is currently the deputy principal of St Peters' School, Cambridge.
