= Rugby Viadana =

Italian rugby union club

(Italy) Rugby Viadana 1970
- Full name: Rugby Viadana 1970 S.r.l.
- Union: Italian Rugby Federation
- Founded: 1970; 56 years ago
- Location: Viadana, Italy
- Ground: Stadio Luigi Zaffanella (Capacity: 6,000)
- Chairman: Davide Tizzi
- Coach: Filippo Frati
- Captain: Brian Ormson
- League: Serie A Élite
| 1st kit | 2nd kit |

Official website
- www.rugbyviadana1970.it

Rugby Viadana 1970 is an Italian rugby union club based in Viadana (province of Mantua, Lombardy). The club was established in 1970, and has since won the Italian championship in 2002, and the Coppa Italia three times. They also compete in European rugby competitions and were runners-up in the European Shield in 2004. Viadana plays in yellow and black. The club did not compete professionally between 2010 and 2012 as they focused their efforts on Aironi. Aironi was based at Viadana's home ground and represented a number of regional teams in the multi-national Celtic League. The FIR withdrew Aironi's licence to play at the end of the 2012, so Viadana reformed as a professional team will play in Italy's top division, the National championship of Excellence, from the 2012–13 season and currently in the Top12.

== History ==
They were founded in 1970 as a rugby sector in the Vitellianense Cebogas Multisports Club by some ex Rugby Parma F.C. players. They started in the lowest possible league, Serie D.

In 1980–81 Viadana won Serie B but after three years the team were relegated back to Serie C. But they bounced back the following year and won promotion back to Serie B. 1986–87 they won promotion to Serie A2 and finished sixth in their first year. However they were relegated back the following year and didn't return for three years.

They finally won promotion to Serie A in 1998–99. In their first season Arix Viadana won the Coppa Italia and made it to the semifinal of the playoffs. In 2000–01 they finished third in the league but again lost in the semifinal playoffs to Benetton Treviso.

In 2002 the Italian championship was reformed with the birth of Super 10 (now Top12). During this season Arix Viadana finished first and beat favourites Benetton Treviso, in the playoffs, and Calvisano, in the final, to win the title of Italian champion for the first time. They were the first team from outside a provincial capital to do so. They won the Coppa Italia a second time in 2003.

In 2004 they became the first Italian team to have made the final of a European competition when they lost the European Shield final 19–25 to Montpellier. In 2007 they defeated Cammi Calvisano to win their third Coppa Italia. In 2008, despite their relatively experienced team, Viadana were beaten in the semifinals by Benetton Treviso and subsequently lost out on a lucrative Heineken Cup place. In the 2008–09 and 2009–10 Super 10 seasons Montepaschi Viadana reaches the final championship, losing both times against Benetton Treviso.

Viadana were the largest shareholders in Aironi, a new team that competed in the 2010–11 and 2012–12 Celtic League. Many of the club's top players joined Aironi on its formation. As of June 2010 it was announced that will the impending establishment of Aironi the club would no longer compete as a professional club. The Senior and Under 20 teams would be merged with GranDucato Parma Rugby. Viadana would continue as an independent club but only below Under 20 level.

At the end of the 2012 Aironi's licence to play in the Pro12 was withdrawn by the FIR. Aironi's place in the Pro12 was taken by newly formed Zebre, a team based in Parma. Many Aironi players joined Zebre on its formation.

Viadana was then reformed as a semi-professional team for the 2012–13 season of the National championship of Excellence, the reformed Italian championship from 2010, with a number of Aironi's players joining them, as well as the head coach Rowland Phillips. They won three titles of the Excellence Trophy in the 2012–13, 2015–16 and 2016–17 seasons.

The 2012–13 was the last season of Silvano Melegari, and of the Arix Group, as president of the club, after 20 years of history. In the summer of 2014, a new company is at the helm of the team, the Rugby Viadana 1970 S.r.l., founded to keep the club at the highest national level, despite economic difficulties. They currently compete in Top12.

== Honours ==
- Italian championship
  - Champions (1): 2001–02
  - Runners-up (5): 2006–07, 2008–09, 2009–10, 2023–24, 2024–25
- Coppa Italia
  - Champions (3): 1999–2000, 2002–03, 2006–07
  - Runners-up (2): 2003–04, 2004–05
- Excellence Trophy
  - Champions (3): 2012–13, 2015–16, 2016–17
- Italian Super Cup:
  - Champions (1): 2007
  - Runners-up (1): 2025
- European Shield
  - Runners-up (1): 2003–04

== Current squad ==
The Viadana squad for 2024–25:

Viadana squad. (Note: Additional player under contract with URC team Zebre Parma) (Note: Additional player on loan to URC team Zebre Parma) (Note: Additional player under contract with URC team Zebre Parma)
| **Props**: (Argentina) Lautaro Martin Caro Saisi; (Italy) Michelangelo Mistretta; (Argentina) Alan Oubina; (Argentina) Rodrigo Oubina; (Italy) Bruno Vallesi; **Hookers**: (Argentina) Ignacio Dorronsoro*; (Italy) Matteo Luccardi; (Italy) Sebastiano Olivari; **Locks**: (Italy) Fabrizio Boschetti; (Argentina) Salvador Aguirre; (Italy) Tommaso Gattia; (Italy) Jacopo Loretoni; (Argentina) Lucas Sommer | **Back row**: (Italy) Antonio Broccio; (Argentina) Mateo Lisandro Casasola*; (Italy) Marcello Catalano; (Italy) Ettore Colledan; (Argentina) Juan Cruz Gamboa*; (Italy) Juan Cruz Marchiori*; (Argentina) Thiago Fernandez; (Argentina) Stefano Jogna Prat*; (Italy) Filippo Lavorenti; **Scrum-halves**: (Italy) Pietro Di Chio; (Italy) Ratko Jelic; (Italy) Sean Maestri; **Fly-halves**: (Argentina) Sebastian Ferro*; (Argentina) Mathias Frutos Macchi* | **Centres**: (Italy) Davide Bernardi; (Argentina) Ezequiel Orellana*; (Italy) Sebastian Zaridze; **Wings**: (Italy) Andrea Bronzini; (Italy) Fabrizio Oro Daniel Ciardullo; (Italy) Alessandro Ciofani; (Italy) Tommasio Jannelli; (Argentina) Matias Sauze; **Fullbacks**: (Italy) Thomas Bussaglia; (Argentina) Juan Marco Morosini*; (South Africa) Andell Loubser |
(c) denotes the team captain, **Bold** denotes internationally capped players.^{*} denotes players qualified to play for Italy on residency or dual nationality. Players and their allocated positions from the Viadana website.

== Selected former players ==
=== Italian players ===
Former players who have played for Viadana and have caps for Italy:

- (Italy) Matías Agüero
- (Italy) Andrea Benatti
- (Italy) Cristian Bezzi
- (Italy) Luca Bigi
- (Italy) Ignacio Brex
- (Italy) Giorgio Bronzini
- (Italy) Pablo Canavosio
- (Italy) Sandro Ceppolino
- (Italy) Carlo Del Fava
- (Italy) Santiago Dellapè
- (Italy) Jaco Erasmus
- (Italy) Ignacio Fernández Rouyet
- (Italy) Joshua Furno
- (Italy) Quintin Geldenhuys
- (Italy) Andrea Masi
- (Italy) Matteo Mazzantini
- (Italy) Ian McKinley
- (Italy) Andrea Moretti
- (Italy) Carlos Nieto
- (Italy) Corrado Pilat
- (Italy) Samuele Pace
- (Italy) Gilberto Pavan
- (Italy) Riccardo Pavan
- (Italy) Roberto Pedrazzi
- (Italy) Aaron Persico
- (Italy) Matthew Phillips
- (Italy) Matteo Pratichetti
- (Italy) Roberto Quartaroli
- (Italy) Juan Manuel Queirolo
- (Italy) Kaine Robertson
- (Italy) Lorenzo Romano
- (Italy) Federico Ruzza
- (Italy) Diego Saccà
- (Italy) Mario Savi
- (Italy) Stefano Saviozzi
- (Italy) Michele Sepe
- (Italy) Josh Sole
- (Italy) Cherif Traorè
- (Italy) Pietro Travagli

=== Overseas players ===
Former players who have played for Viadana and have caps for their respective country:

- (Argentina) Germán Araoz
- (Argentina) Julio-César García
- (Argentina) Juan Cruz Guillemaín
- (Argentina) Javier Rojas
- (Australia) Tom Bowman
- (Australia) Lloyd Johansson
- (Canada) Phil Murphy
- (England) Tom Beim
- (Fiji) Isoa Neivua
- (Hungary) – (Switzerland) Luca Tramontin
- (New Zealand) Dion Waller
- (New Zealand) Mark Finlay
- (New Zealand) Brett Harvey
- (New Zealand) Sean Hohneck
- (New Zealand) Sam Harding
- (New Zealand) Tana Umaga
- (Samoa) Daniel Farani
- (Samoa) Dominic Fe'aunati
- (Samoa) Ali Koko
- (Samoa) Siaosi Vaili
- (Scotland) Stuart Moffat
- (Tonga) Inoke Afeaki
- (Tonga) Pierre Hola
- (Tonga) Dave Tiueti
- (United States) Nick Civetta
- (Wales) Adrian Durston
- (Wales) Sonny Parker

== Statistics ==
=== European Challenge Cup (1996–2014) ===
| Season | Played | Won | Drawn | Lost | For | Against |
|---|---|---|---|---|---|---|
| 2000-01 | 4 | 0 | 0 | 4 | 78 | 147 |
| 2001-02 | 6 | 2 | 0 | 4 | 120 | 210 |
| 2003-04 | 2 | 1 | 0 | 1 | 41 | 61 |
| 2004-05 | 4 | 3 | 0 | 1 | 184 | 50 |
| 2005-06 | 6 | 0 | 0 | 6 | 81 | 244 |
| 2006-07 | 6 | 2 | 0 | 4 | 114 | 145 |
| 2008-09 | 6 | 3 | 0 | 3 | 120 | 126 |
| 2013-14 | 6 | 0 | 1 | 5 | 86 | 356 |

==== European Shield ====
| Season | Played | Won | Drawn | Lost | For | Against |
|---|---|---|---|---|---|---|
| 2003-04 | 7 | 5 | 0 | 2 | 250 | 166 |

=== Heineken Cup (1995–2014) ===
| Season | Played | Won | Drawn | Lost | For | Against |
|---|---|---|---|---|---|---|
| 2002-03 | 6 | 0 | 0 | 6 | 128 | 348 |
| 2007-08 | 6 | 0 | 0 | 6 | 106 | 208 |
| 2009-10 | 6 | 0 | 0 | 6 | 83 | 295 |
