= Romain Froment =

French rugby union player (born 1977)

- Born: 26 May 1977 (age 49) Clamart, France
- Height: 1.85 m (6 ft 1 in)
- Weight: 100 kg (15 st 10 lb)

Rugby union career
- Position: Flanker
Senior career
Years	Team	Apps	(Points)
1998-2001	Stade Français		
2001-2006	Castres	102	(60)
2006-2010	Section Paloise	108	(60)
2010-	FC Lourdes	14	(10)
International career
Years	Team	Apps	(Points)
2004	France	1	(0)

Romain Froment (born 26 May 1977) is a French rugby union player. He began his career at Stade Français in the Top 14, making his debut for France on 3 July 2004 against USA.
