= Raphaël Bastide =

Spain international rugby union player

- Born: Rafael Bastide Gutierrez; 24 November 1977 (age 48) Bilbao, Spain
- Height: 1.86 m (6 ft 1 in)
- Weight: 93 kg (205 lb)

Rugby union career
- Position: Wing
Senior career
Years	Team	Apps	(Points)
- Perpignan
–	Colomiers		
–	Auch		
- Correct as of 2008-02-28
International career
Years	Team	Apps	(Points)
1997 - 1999	Spain	12	(15)
- Correct as of 2007-11-28

Rafael Bastide Gutierrez also known as Raphaël Bastide (born 24 November 1977, in Bilbao) is a Spanish rugby union winger who has played professionally for Perpignan, Colomiers and, since 2004 for Auch. He played for Spain at the 1999 Rugby World Cup against Uruguay.
