= Stadio Luigi Zaffanella =

Sport venue in Viadana, Italy

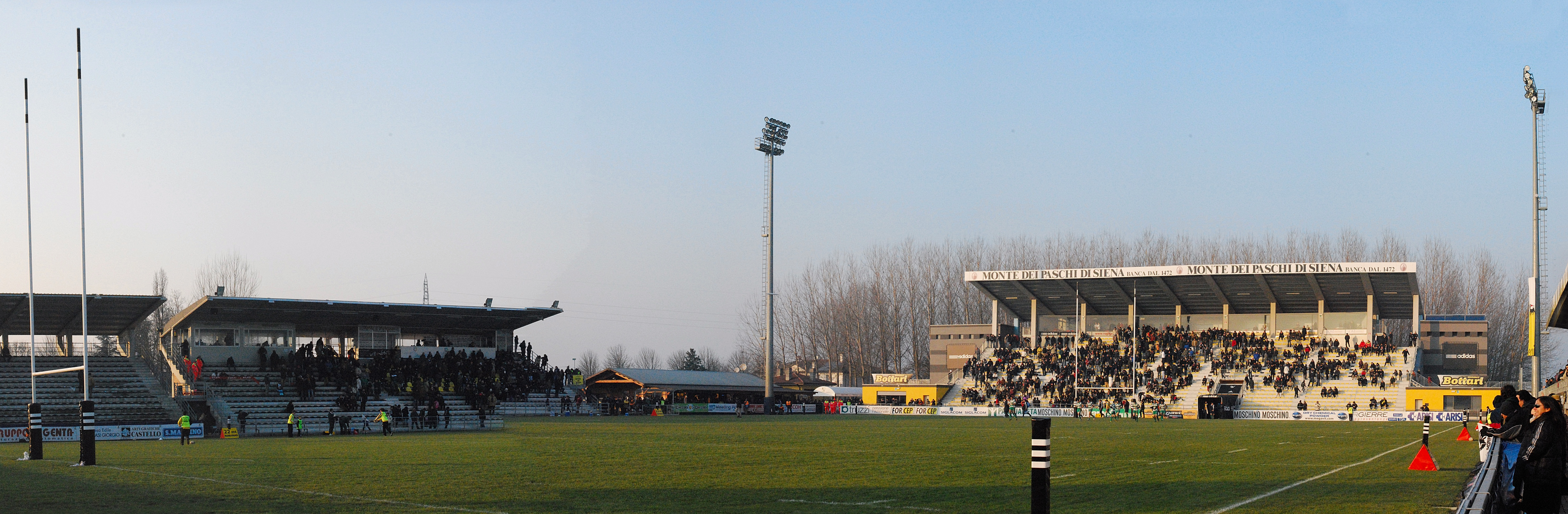
- Interactive map of Stadio Luigi Zaffanella
- Location: Viadana, Italy
- Coordinates: 44.934015°N 10.517757°E
- Owner: Commune of Viadana
- Capacity: 6,000
- Surface: grass
- Field size: 105m x 68m

Construction
- Built: 1992
- Opened: 1993
- Renovated: 2010

Tenants
- Aironi (2010-2012); Rugby Viadana (1993-2010) (2013-present)

Stadio Luigi Zaffanella is a multi-use stadium in Viadana, Italy. It is currently used mostly for rugby union and football matches. It was the home ground of the now defunct Aironi for their Celtic League games.

The ground is owned by Rugby Viadana and previously hosted the club's National Championship of Excellence team prior to the 2010/2011 season. In order for the ground to be of a suitable standard for the Celtic League major improvement works are to be carried out in 2011.

The east grandstand was doubled in size in 2010 taking the total ground capacity to 6,000. Hospitality, training and parking facilities were also added. The stadium holds 6,000 people.
