= Rugby Leonessa 1928 =

Defunct Italian rugby union club, based in Brescia

- Full name: Rugby Leonessa 1928 S.r.l.
- Union: FIR
- Founded: 2001; 24 years ago
- Disbanded: 2008; 17 years ago
- Location: Brescia, Italy
- Ground(s): Stadio Aldo Invernici (Capacity: 5,000)
1st kit	2nd kit

Rugby Leonessa 1928 is a former Italian rugby union club based in Brescia, Lombardy.

The team was formed in 2001 after the merger of A.S. Rugby Brescia and Rugby Rovato. Rugby Brescia was founded as XV Legione Leonessa d’Italia in 1928, while Rovato was founded in 1976.

The newly merged team, coached by Mathew Vaea and Frank Bunce, started in Serie A gaining the promotion to Super 10 with a record number of points (111 points) and 19 straight wins. In the 2003–04 season they played in Super 10 (now Top12), but were relegated the following 2004–05 season, under the technical guide of Lynn Howells.

In 2008 the club was disbanded while Rugby Brescia and Rugby Rovato went their separate ways.

== Honours ==
- Italian championship
  - Champions (1): 1974–75 (as Rugby Brescia)

== Notable former players ==
- (Italy) Kris Burton
- (Italy) Massimo Cuttitta
- (Italy) Alberto Di Bernardo
- (Italy) Ignacio Fernández Rouyet
- (Italy) Alberto Di Bernardo
- (Italy) Rima Wakarua
