= Viadana, Lombardy =

Viadana Viadàna (Emilian)
- Comune
- Comune di Viadana
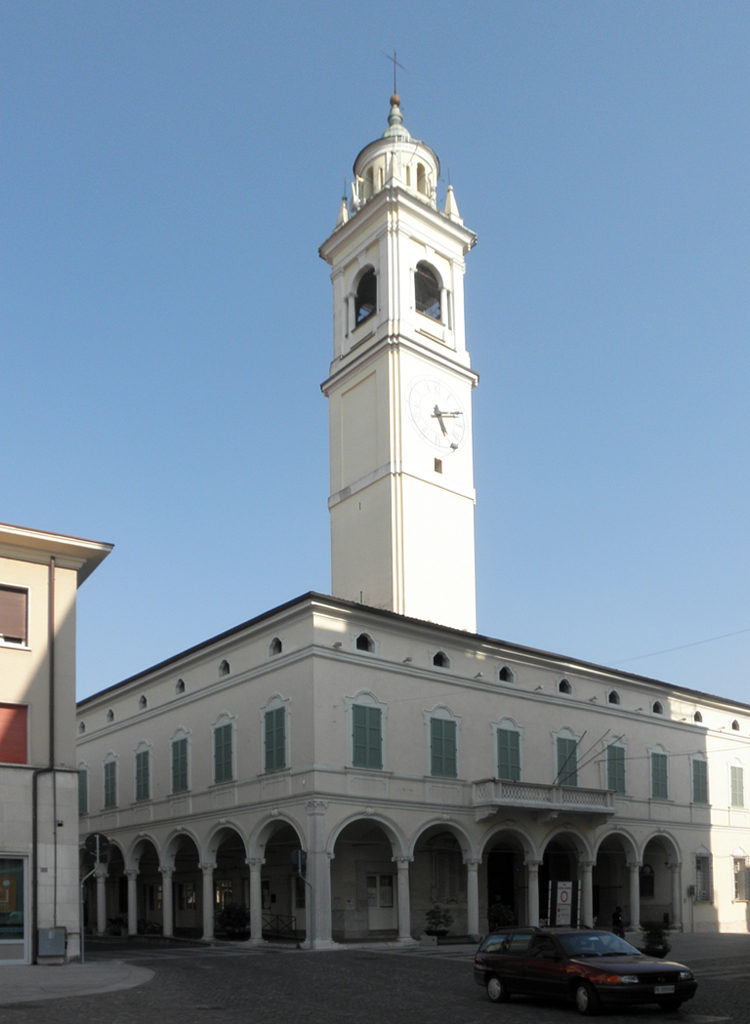
- Town hall.

- Flag Coat of arms

- Location within Italy Location within Lombardy
- Coordinates: 44°55′N 10°31′E
- Country: Italy
- Region: Lombardy
- Province: Mantua (MN)
- Frazioni: Banzuolo, Bellaguarda, Bocca Chiavica, Buzzoletto, Cavallara, Cicognara, Cizzolo, Cogozzo, Sabbioni, Salina, San Matteo delle Chiaviche, Squarzanella

Government
  - Mayor: Nicola Cavatorta

Area
  - Total: 103.84 km^{2} (40.09 sq mi)
- Elevation: 26 m (85 ft)

Population (June 30, 2017)
  - Total: 20,013
  - Density: 192.73/km^{2} (499.17/sq mi)
- Demonym: Viadanesi
- Time zone: UTC+1 (CET)
  - Summer (DST): UTC+2 (CEST)
- Postal code: 46019
- Dialing code: 0375
- Patron saint: St. Nicholas
- Saint day: September 10
- Website: Official website

Viadana (Casalasco-Viadanese: Viadàna) is a comune (municipality) in the Province of Mantua in the Italian region of Lombardy. It is located approximately 120 kilometres (75 mi) southeast of Milan and 35 kilometres (22 mi) southwest of Mantua.

Viadana borders the following municipalities: Boretto, Borgo Virgilio, Brescello, Casalmaggiore, Commessaggio, Dosolo, Gazzuolo, Marcaria, Mezzani, Motteggiana, Pomponesco, Sabbioneta, Suzzara.

It is the hometown of the rugby union club Rugby Viadana.

== Physical geography ==
The municipal territory lies at the southwestern end of the province of Mantua and borders three other provinces: Cremona (municipality of Casalmaggiore), Parma (municipality of Mezzani), and Reggio nell'Emilia (municipalities of Boretto and Brescello). The territory is completely flat and is watered by the Po River along its entire southern border and by the Oglio River for much of its northern border.

Historically, corrosion and floods caused by the Po and the Oglio caused entire villas to disappear, until the present territorial layout of about 102 km^{2} (39 sq mi) came to be. It is now protected by large reinforced embankments

The territory of Viadana is part of the geographical area called Bassa Padana. With its 102.50 km^{2} (39.58 sq mi) area, Viadana is the largest municipality in the province of Mantua.

=== Geology ===
Viadana is located near the Piadena anticline, which, according to some authors, was the epicenter of the violent 3 January 1117, earthquake that struck the Po Valley.

=== Climate ===
The climate of Viadana is very humid, with hot summers, and colder temperatures in winter.

== History ==
The presence of humans on islands formed by the Po river and its tributaries (Adda and Oglio) has been confirmed by finds of artifacts attributed to the Neolithic period, around the 4th millennium B.C., which are now housed in the museum dedicated to its Viadanese founder, Monsignor Antonio Parazzi. Parazzi discovered various archaeological sites, uncovering artifacts belonging to the Bronze Age and Ancient Rome. Settlements from Greek and Roman times have survived.

The Cavalcabò family, the landlords of Viadana, had their jurisdiction conferred by Emperor Frederick I on 30 July 1158. They issued statutes in the mid-14th century that remained in force until the early 19th century.

There are records of a medieval-era fortress (the present "Public Gardens" and the building of the elementary schools and Technical Institute) and walls that marked the perimeter of the village, which were destroyed in 1700. Documented within the walls is the presence of the churches of S. Maria Assunta and S. Cristoforo in Castello (opposite the former Verdi cinema). Parmigianino took refuge here during the siege of Parma in 1521.

In 1415 following the conquest of Gian Francesco Gonzaga, Viadana bound itself permanently to Mantua, with the exception of a brief period in the 19th due to a treaty signed by Pavesino Avigni.

The rivers acted as communication and trade routes—especially to Venice—to such an extent that Viadana was the seat of a Vice-Admiral appointed from Mantua; not only that: an area once owned by the Del Bon family, which owned real estate and commercial and industrial activities in the lagoon city, still bears the name of Villa del Veneziano. On 8 April 1530, Charles V, in awarding Marquis Frederick II the title of Duke, granted that the eldest male son bear the title of Marquis of Viadana, elevating the territory into an autonomous marquisate, distinct from the Duchy of Mantua. Belonging to the main branch of the Gonzaga family, Viadana did not have a mint, maintained a certain economic autonomy, and had its own currency and special weights and measures for trading. Gonzaga rule ended on July 23, 1708, when the Habsburg Empire, having declared the Mantuan family forfeit, regained possession of its fiefs.

The marquisate was finally suppressed in 1771 and aggregated with Austrian Lombardy. Viadana remained with Lombardy until the Peace of Villafranca in 1859, in which it was assigned to the province of Cremona. On 1 July 1868, it returned to Mantua.

Viadana became well-known in Europe in the 2000s due to the local rugby union team, Rugby Viadana, which participates annually in European competitions in addition to winning the Scudetto in 2002 and six Italian Cups and Trophies Eccellenza. From 2010 to 2012, the town found itself at the center of the national and international rugby scene, thanks to the birth of the Aironi franchise, based in the city of Viadana. Together with Benetton, they are the only two Italian rugby teams to represent the country in the prestigious Celtic League, a competition previously reserved exclusively for clubs from Scotland, Ireland and Wales. However, the experience was short-lived; after only two sporting seasons, on 6 April 2012, the FIR revoked Aironi's license at the end of the season for economic reasons.

=== Symbols ===
The coat of arms was officially recognised by a decree of the Head of Government dated 2 June 1934.

The gonfalon was granted by royal decree on 22 February 1940 and consists of a yellow banner.

The civic flag was granted by presidential decree on 15 July 2004. It consists of a green field bearing, at its centre, a golden lion seated on a red cushion and holding in its forepaws two golden fleurs-de-lis arranged vertically and joined together, with the lower one inverted. The hoist is divided vertically into green, red, and yellow.

== Monuments and places of interest ==
=== Religious architectures ===
In the town of Viadana:

- Chiesa arcipretale di Santa Maria Assunta e San Cristoforo in Castello, on piazza Gramsci.
- Chiesa di San Pietro Apostolo, on via Aroldi.
- Chiesa di San Rocco e San Sebastiano, già Oratorio dei Confratelli Neri del SS. Crocifisso, on via San Rocco.
- Chiesa di San Martino e San Nicola, on via Cavour.
- Chiesa di Santa Maria Annunziata, on piazza Solferino.

In municipal hamlets:

- Chiesa di Santa Giulia, in the hamlet of Cicognara.
- Chiesa dei SS. Filippo e Giacomo Apostoli, in the hamlet of Cogozzo.
- Chiesa del Santo Spirito, in the hamlet of Buzzoleto.
- Basilica insigne dei SS. Stefano e Anna, in the hamlet of Cavallara.
- Chiesa di San Giacomo Maggiore, in the hamlet of Cizzolo.
- Chiesa di San Antonino Abate, in the hamlet of Salina.
- Chiesa di San Ignazio Martire, in the hamlet of Casaletto.
- Chiesa di San Matto Apostolo, in the hamlet of San Matteo delle Chiaviche.
- Chiesa di Santa Maria Maddalena, in the hamlet of Bellaguarda.
- Chiesa di San Lodovico Re e Confessore, in the hamlet of Sabbioni.
- Chiesa di San Giovanni Battista, in the hamlet of Banzuolo.

== Culture ==
MuVi is the name of the Multipurpose Cultural Center in Viadana that hosts cultural and recreational activities, exhibitions, and events. The acronym stands for Musei Viadana. The MuVi is on Via Manzoni, in the building of the former elementary school.

The center currently houses the Civic Gallery of Modern and Contemporary Art, the Adolfo Ghinzelli City Museum, the Antonio Parazzi Civic Museum, the Fratelli Azzolini photography club, and the Luigi Parazzi municipal library, which is a member of the Rete Bibliotecaria Mantovana. Every month, it is possible to attend meetings of the Viadana Reading Group (Letto e Mangiato) with the background of books from the Municipal Library. Prominent among the relics in the sphragistics collection of the Civic Museum is a high hierarchical seal of the Knights of Altopascio, depicting St. James. Found in the area, it harkens back to medieval pilgrimages and the probable presence of an important hospice near the Po River, which had to be crossed in both directions for those traveling along the German road.

MuVi houses two viadaness associations: Apeiron and Fondazione Ponchiroli. The first was born to help MuVi organising cultural activities. The second is dedicated to professor Daniele Ponchiroli, it aims to preserve his documents and to create activities and events in order to support viadanese citizens.

== Subdivisions ==
The municipality of Viadana consists of several hamlets, including Cogozzo, Cicognara, Cizzolo, and San Matteo delle Chiaviche. The municipality is about 40 km from Mantua, 25 km from Parma, 30 km from Reggio Emilia, and 50 km from Cremona.

=== Frazione ===
==== Cizzolo ====
Cizzolo (in dialect Sisöl) is located in the northern part of the municipality. With its 800 inhabitants, it is the third most populous hamlet in the municipality of Viadana. Places of interest are the church of San Giacomo Maggiore Apostolo and the castle owned by the Frati family.

==== Cogozzo ====
Cogozzo (in dialect Cugos) located next to Cicognara is one of the most industrialised hamlets of Viadana. It is also highly agriculturally developed, although the produce is sometimes ruined by nutria.

==== Cicognara ====
Cicognara (in dialect, Sigugnéra), the westernmost hamlet of the Viadanese territory (bordering the territory of the municipality of Casalmaggiore) and the second in order of inhabitants after Cogozzo, has become famous for the great entrepreneurial spirit that has made it a major industrial reality, relying on several dozen small and medium-sized companies that employ many people in the Oglio-Po district. The main activity of these small and medium-sized companies is the production of paintbrushes. In particular, as early as the mid-19th century, from the production of sorghum brooms (a trade that has practically disappeared locally today) to the production of brushes, taking advantage of the raw material used at the time, the bristles of pigs conspicuously bred in the Viadanese area. After the middle of the last century, Cicognara established itself as the main brush-making district.

The symbol of the town is a stork on a strip of land representing the Insula Cicunaria, an island on which the settlement arose and which was separated from the mainland by continuous flooding and the irregular course of the Po River, unlike what it looks like today. There is also a motto in Latin, Cicognara et Cogozzo essenti (usually accompanied by the stork emblem), which derives from the tax exemption granted to Cicognara (and Cogozzo precisely) from the time of Desiderio and maintained until the 18th century (Desiderio, born in Brescia, was king of the Lombards and king of Italy from 757 to 774). The patron saint of the village is Santa Giulia, to whom the parish church is dedicated; Don Primo Mazzolari was pastor from 1921 to 1932 and parishioner Grazia Deledda was married in 1900 to Rag. Palmiro Medesani from Cicognaro. Three valuable stained glass windows (the Nativity, the Holy Family, and St. Giulia) by Cremonese painter Giuseppe Moroni can be admired in the church. Also in the church was a Roman-era cippus datable to around 150 AD, while near the church stood the Monastery of St. Julia, founded in 758 by Ansa, Desiderio's wife.

==== San Matteo delle Chiaviche ====
San Matteo delle Chiaviche is located at the confluence of the Po and Oglio rivers. The Torre d'Oglio boat bridge, which crosses the Oglio River at its confluence with the Po, is famous. It is the fourth-most populated hamlet of Viadana and is about 15 km from Viadana.

==== Buzzoletto ====
Buzzoletto is located about 3 kilometers from the capital city. Once a purely agricultural center, it had a significant residential building development in the early-21st century. The town is divided between the area of the "center" and the area of Via Codisotto, formerly Baruffaldi.

== Economy ==
An agricultural center rich in pig breeding, Viadana, similar to the other small towns of the Po Valley, underwent a rapid conversion to an industrial hub during the post-World War II period, which marked an economic and demographic expansion of the town.

Activities revolve around the textile industry, the wood panel manufacturing industry, and in the past, lso the brush industry. Other types of industries include meat processing and construction.

== Infrastructure and transportation ==
Historically accessible by river, thanks to its proximity to the Po, Viadana is located along State Road 358; Provincial Road 59 branches off from it at that location.

The town is served by the Brescello-Viadana station, located on the Emilia-Romagna side of the river along the Parma-Suzzara railroad, operated by FER and served by regional trains run by Tper under the service contract signed with the Emilia-Romagna Region.

Between 1886 and 1933 Viadana served as the southern terminus of another rail link, the Mantua-Viadana tramway, operated by the Valentini and Mazzorin company and, since 1903 directly by the provincial administration. There is also transportation by public Lili, operated by APAM Spa, connecting Viadana with the various towns in the Mantua area and the capital city of Mantua.

== Sports ==
=== Football ===
Unione Calcistica Viadana S.S.D. S.r.l. is the main football team of the town of Viadana, currently playing in the First Category league, the fourth amateur and seventh level of the Italian football league.

=== Rugby ===
Rugby Viadana 1970 S.r.l. S.S.D. is the rugby club of the town of Viadana. Founded in 1970, it has been one of the leading formations on the national rugby scene in the 2000s, and were Italian champions from 2001–2002. Currently it plays in the Italian top division championship and holds its home matches at Luigi Zaffanella Stadium.

=== Basketball ===
A.S.D. Basket Viadana is the men's basketball team of the town of Viadana. Founded in 1964, it currently plays in the national Serie C, the fourth level of the Italian basketball league.

== Twin towns ==
- Cutro, Italy
- Kleszczów, Poland, since 2006
- Alba Iulia, Romania, since 2006
