= Stadio Mario Battaglini =

Rugby stadium in Rovigo, Italy

- The tribuna Quaglio (East stand)
- Interactive map of Stadio Mario Battaglini
- Location: Via della Costituzione 6, Rovigo, Italy
- Coordinates: 45.0796°N 11.7968°E
- Owner: City of Rovigo
- Capacity: 5,500
- Surface: Grass

Construction
- Opened: 1970

Tenants
- Rugby Rovigo Delta (1970–present); Alligators Rovigo (2018–present)

Website
- Official site

Stadio Mario Battaglini is a multi-purpose stadium located in Rovigo, Italy. Inaugurated on 1970, since then it has been the home stadium of Rugby Rovigo Delta.

From 2018, it is also the home stadium of the American football team Alligators Rovigo.

It has a capacity of 5500 spectators and named after Mario Battaglini, rugby union player and coach, who died in 1971.

== History ==
The stadium's construction dated back from the mid 1960s, when the city administration programmed, following the lead of the 1963-64 scudetto, a suitable home stadium for Rugby Rovigo. An area in the Commenda neighbourhood between Via della Costituzione and Via Aflieri was chosen, over which the stadium was inaugurated in the autumn of 1970 and, later, chosen to host its first international match, the last round of the 1969-70 FIRA Nations Cup between Italy and Romania, won 14-3 by the Romanians.

One of most important international matches played there, was the one played on 28 November 1979 against an All Blacks XV; which did not had the test match status, since the NZRFU did not award international caps to its own players: the match eventually ended 18-12 with a win for New Zealand and the stadium was overcrowded with 11,000 supporters, more than what the stadium could allow to host, that the Rovigo police headquarters had to order the opening of the gates to allow the ticketless spectators which exceeded the stadium's capacity, almost all of them being students, to place themselves behind the advertising boards on the pitchside.

Another important match played at the Battaglini was played during the 1982-83 FIRA Trophy: Italy managed to achieve its first useful against France in an international match, even though the French side was an A1 team and the match did not had a test status. The final score was 6-6, with a try converted by both sides; following the first victory of Italy against a Home Nation, Scotland XV (during which the players were not awarded), in 1993, by 18-15.

The stadium was later expanded and refurbished with the building of the East stand, currently named in after Isidoro Quaglio (1942-2008), a former Rovigo player and international for Italy. During the playoff-era of the top-flight national rugby championship, the stadium has also hosted four times the final, on 1996, on 1999, on 2002 and on 2011.During the final played on 28 May 2011 between Rovigo and Petrarca, the North stand (which previously was unusable) and a South stand was made exclusively for the away crowd; with those modifications, the stadium's capacity was provisorially extended to 7000 spectators. It also hosted the 2011 IRB Junior World Championship, played in Italy.

== Bibliography ==
- La sesta nazione. Ottant’anni di storia della Federazione Italiana Rugby. Parma: Grafiche Step. ISBN 1-01-000003530-7.
