= Gran Ducato Parma Rugby =

Italian rugby union club, based in Parma

(Italy) Amatori Parma Rugby
- Full name: Amatori Parma Rugby
- Union: Federazione Italiana Rugby
- Founded: 1971-1999 (as Amatori Parma); 1999-2010 (as GRAN Parma); 2010-2011 (as Gran Ducato); 2011 (as Amatori Parma)
- Location: Parma, Italy
- Ground(s): Stadio Sergio Lanfranchi, Parma and Stadio Maini, Colorno
- League: n/a
- 2010-11: 5th (Excellence)
1st kit	2nd kit

Amatori Parma Rugby is a historical Italian rugby union team founded in 1971.

== History ==
=== From Amatori to Gran Ducato ===
Gran Parma Rugby was founded in 1999 following the merger of Amatori Parma Rugby and Rugby Noceto.

From 1999 to 2002 they competed in Seria A2 and won promotion to Serie A1. They finished eighth in their first season in the top flight which gave them the right to join the newly formed Super 10 (now Top12). They made their European debut in 2002–03 in the European Shield.

GranDucato Parma Rugby was formed in June 2010 through the merger of Gran Parma Rugby, Rugby Colorno and Rugby Viadana. With the formation of Aironi to play in the Celtic League, the best players and sponsorship from the three participating clubs were concentrated in this new single club Aironi. As a result of Aironi, these three teams decided to merge their senior and U-20 teams in order to better compete in the National Championship of Excellence for the 2010/2011 season. The three teams continued to exist below the U-20 level independently with the goal of producing players for GranDucato, and ultimately Aironi and the national team.

Aironi struggled in the two season in the Magners League ran into financial difficulties and were replaced by Zebre. Viadana reformed as a professional team in the National Championship of Excellence.

=== Come back to Amatori Parma ===
From the 2011/12 season with the original name of Amatori Parma, it participates with a team in the Serie B championship, in addition to having seven youth representatives from Under 6 to Under 20. He is promoted and in the following season 2012/13 he plays in the Serie A2 championship, but arriving eleventh and facing the relegation in Serie B. In the 2014/15 season the blucelesti reach salvation and win the seventh place in the standings.

=== European Challenge Cup ===
Season	Played	Won	Drawn	Lost	For	Against
2001–02	6	0	0	6	104	277
(Shield) 2002–03	2	1	0	1	41	46
2002–03	2	0	0	2	22	97
(Shield) 2003–04	2	1	0	1	58	75
2003–04	2	0	0	2	16	76
Shield 2004–05	2	1	0	1	26	55
2004–05	2	0	0	2	37	66
2006–07	6	0	0	6	84	296
2007–08	6	0	1	5	82	259
