= Stadio Sergio Lanfranchi (original) =

Sports stadium in Parma, Italy

- Interactive map of Stadio Sergio Lanfranchi
- Former names: Stadio di viale Piacenza; Stadio Fratelli Cervi
- Location: Viale Piacenza; 43100 Parma, Italy
- Coordinates: 44°48′34″N 10°19′19″E
- Owner: City of Parma
- Capacity: 3,600
- Surface: Grass

Construction
- Demolished: July 2008

Tenants
- Crociati Parma Rugby FC; Gran Parma Rugby; Parma Panthers

Stadio Sergio Lanfranchi (or Sergio Lanfranchi Stadium) was a sports stadium in the city of Parma in the Emilia-Romagna region of northern Italy.

The stadium was named after Sergio Lanfranchi (1925–2001), an international rugby union forward from Parma who played for Italy from 1949 to 1961 and spent most of his club career in France.

It was a 3,600-seat arena which hosted Gran Ducato Parma Rugby and Crociati Parma Rugby FC rugby union teams. It also hosted the Parma Panthers American football team. The stadium is described and referenced numerous times in the book Playing for Pizza by John Grisham.

The stadium was demolished in July 2008 because the area was chosen for the headquarters of the European Food Safety Authority. Since then, the teams play their home games at the Stadio XXV Aprile.

In January 2015, Stadio XXV Aprile was renamed as the Stadio Sergio Lanfranchi.
