= 2009–10 Italian Rugby Union Championship =

The 2009–10 Italian Rugby Union Championship was the 80th season of the Italian Rugby Union Championship. It was also the last season to feature Benetton Treviso before they joined the Celtic League facing teams from Scotland, Ireland and Wales.

== Results ==
=== Matchday 1 ===
Saturday, September 12, 2009
16:00
Lyons R. Veneziamestre	32 : 32 (12:22)	Femi-CZ R. Rovigo Delta
Petrarca Rugby	32 : 29 (20:12)	Plusvalore Gran Parma
Parma Rugby FC 1931	30 : 10 (18:3)	Futura Park R.Roma
L'Aquila Rugby Club	22 : 20 (6:10)	Mps Viadana
R.C. I Cavalieri	0 : 20	Benetton Treviso

=== Matchday 2 ===
Saturday, September 19, 2009
16:00
Femi-CZ R. Rovigo Delta	15 : 10 (12:0)	Parma Rugby FC 1931
Mps Viadana	41 : 10 (19:7)	Lyons R. Veneziamestre
Benetton Treviso	36 : 3 (6:0)	Petrarca Rugby
Futura Park R.Roma	22 : 15 (9:12)	R.C. I Cavalieri
Plusvalore Gran Parma	26 : 13 (20:6)	L'Aquila Rugby Club

=== Matchday 3 ===
Saturday, September 26, 2009
16:00
Parma Rugby FC 1931	13 : 12 (0:3)	Benetton Treviso
R.C. I Cavalieri	21 : 10 (11:5)	Mps Viadana
Petrarca Rugby	46 : 27	L'Aquila Rugby Club
Futura Park R.Roma	26 : 27 (3:18)	Femi-CZ R. Rovigo Delta
Lyons R. Veneziamestre	30 : 19 (18:3)	Plusvalore Gran Parma

=== Matchday 4 ===
Wednesday, September 30, 2009
16:00
Petrarca Rugby	36 : 3	Lyons R. Veneziamestre
Mps Viadana	29 : 10	Futura Park R.Roma
Plusvalore Gran Parma	15 : 36	Parma Rugby FC 1931
Benetton Treviso	17 : 12	Femi-CZ R. Rovigo Delta
L'Aquila Rugby Club	20 : 29	R.C. I Cavalieri

=== Matchday 5 ===
Sunday, October 4, 2009
16:00
R.C. I Cavalieri	35 : 0	Plusvalore Gran Parma
Futura Park R.Roma	19 : 34	Benetton Treviso
Parma Rugby FC 1931	24 : 22	Petrarca Rugby
Femi-CZ R. Rovigo Delta	19 : 21	Mps Viadana
Lyons R. Veneziamestre	26 : 48	L'Aquila Rugby Club

=== Matchday 6 ===
Saturday, October 24, 2009
16:00
Plusvalore Gran Parma	23 : 23	Femi-CZ R. Rovigo Delta
Lyons R. Veneziamestre	8 : 57	Futura Park R.Roma
Petrarca Rugby	24 : 17	R.C. I Cavalieri
Mps Viadana	22 : 6	Benetton Treviso
L'Aquila Rugby Club	22 : 19	Parma Rugby FC 1931

=== Matchday 7 ===
Saturday, October 31, 2009
00:00
Femi-CZ R. Rovigo Delta	12 : 10	L'Aquila Rugby Club
15:00
Benetton Treviso	43 : 6	Plusvalore Gran Parma
Futura Park R.Roma	19 : 13	Petrarca Rugby
Parma Rugby FC 1931	11 : 32	Mps Viadana
R.C. I Cavalieri	29 : 21	Lyons R. Veneziamestre

=== Matchday 8 ===
Sunday, November 29, 2009
15:00
Plusvalore Gran Parma	13 : 10	Mps Viadana
L'Aquila Rugby Club	6 : 16	Futura Park R.Roma
Petrarca Rugby	18 : 17	Femi-CZ R. Rovigo Delta
Lyons R. Veneziamestre	6 : 28	Benetton Treviso
R.C. I Cavalieri	24 : 17	Parma Rugby FC 1931

=== Matchday 9 ===
Saturday, December 5, 2009
15:00
Futura Park R.Roma	30 : 10	Plusvalore Gran Parma
Mps Viadana	36 : 6	Petrarca Rugby
Benetton Treviso	37 : 19	L'Aquila Rugby Club
Femi-CZ R. Rovigo Delta	13 : 9	R.C. I Cavalieri
Parma Rugby FC 1931	37 : 16	Lyons R. Veneziamestre

=== Matchday 10 ===
Wednesday, January 6, 2010
14:00
Femi-CZ R. Rovigo Delta	12 : 16	Lyons R. Veneziamestre
15:00
Plusvalore Gran Parma	8 : 35	Petrarca Rugby
Futura Park R.Roma	12 : 6	Parma Rugby FC 1931
Mps Viadana	28 : 6	L'Aquila Rugby Club
Benetton Treviso	24 : 30	R.C. I Cavalieri

=== Matchday 11 ===
Sunday, January 10, 2010
14:00
Petrarca Rugby	8 : 3	Benetton Treviso
15:00
L'Aquila Rugby Club	28 : 12	Plusvalore Gran Parma
R.C. I Cavalieri	22 : 6	Futura Park R.Roma
Lyons R. Veneziamestre	0 : 6	Mps Viadana
Parma Rugby FC 1931	18 : 20	Femi-CZ R. Rovigo Delta

=== Matchday 12 ===
Saturday, March 27, 2010
15:00
Plusvalore Gran Parma	24 : 17	Lyons R. Veneziamestre
Femi-CZ R. Rovigo Delta	35 : 13	Futura Park R.Roma
L'Aquila Rugby Club	20 : 18	Petrarca Rugby
Mps Viadana	25 : 11	R.C. I Cavalieri
Benetton Treviso	41 : 5	Parma Rugby FC 1931

=== Matchday 13 ===
Saturday, April 3, 2010
16:00
Parma Rugby FC 1931	25 : 28	Plusvalore Gran Parma
Futura Park R.Roma	18 : 26	Mps Viadana
Lyons R. Veneziamestre	24 : 19	Petrarca Rugby
Femi-CZ R. Rovigo Delta	34 : 28	Benetton Treviso
R.C. I Cavalieri	19 : 25	L'Aquila Rugby Club

=== Matchday 14 ===
Saturday, April 10, 2010
16:00
Plusvalore Gran Parma	14 : 23	R.C. I Cavalieri
Benetton Treviso	61 : 26	Futura Park R.Roma
Petrarca Rugby	24 : 13	Parma Rugby FC 1931
Mps Viadana	18 : 22	Femi-CZ R. Rovigo Delta
L'Aquila Rugby Club	24 : 22	Lyons R. Veneziamestre

=== Matchday 15 ===
Saturday, April 17, 2010
16:00
Femi-CZ R. Rovigo Delta	20 : 15	Plusvalore Gran Parma
Futura Park R.Roma	19 : 19	Lyons R. Veneziamestre
R.C. I Cavalieri	24 : 19	Petrarca Rugby
Benetton Treviso	39 : 33	Mps Viadana
Parma Rugby FC 1931	20 : 19	L'Aquila Rugby Club

=== Matchday 16 ===
Saturday, April 24, 2010
16:00
Plusvalore Gran Parma	10 : 36	Benetton Treviso
Petrarca Rugby	32 : 6	Futura Park R.Roma
Mps Viadana	28 : 24	Parma Rugby FC 1931
L'Aquila Rugby Club	0 : 20	Femi-CZ R. Rovigo Delta
Lyons R. Veneziamestre	16 : 34	R.C. I Cavalieri

=== Matchday 17 ===
Saturday, May 1, 2010
16:00
Mps Viadana	19 : 15	Plusvalore Gran Parma
Femi-CZ R. Rovigo Delta	27 : 13	Petrarca Rugby
Futura Park R.Roma	23 : 13	L'Aquila Rugby Club
Benetton Treviso	44 : 16	Lyons R. Veneziamestre
Parma Rugby FC 1931	26 : 20	R.C. I Cavalieri

=== Matchday 18 ===
Saturday, May 8, 2010
16:00
Plusvalore Gran Parma	13 : 7	Futura Park R.Roma
Petrarca Rugby	23 : 26	Mps Viadana
L'Aquila Rugby Club	12 : 59	Benetton Treviso
R.C. I Cavalieri	32 : 42	Femi-CZ R. Rovigo Delta
Lyons R. Veneziamestre	20 : 21	Parma Rugby FC 1931

== Table ==
Position	Team	Points	Played	W	D	L	Pf:Pa	Diff.
1	Benetton Treviso	67	18	13	0	5	568:274	294
2	Mps Viadana	61	18	13	0	5	430:276	154
3	Femi-CZ R. Rovigo Delta	61	18	12	2	4	402:319	83
4	Petrarca Rugby	46	18	9	0	9	391:359	32
5	R.C. I Cavalieri	44	18	10	0	8	394:344	50
6	Parma Rugby FC 1931	42	18	8	0	10	355:380	-25
7	Futura Park R.Roma	35	18	7	1	10	339:399	-60
8	L'Aquila Rugby Club	32	18	7	0	11	334:452	-118
9	Plusvalore Gran Parma	25	18	5	1	12	280:462	-182
10	Lyons R. Veneziamestre	22	18	3	2	13	302:530	-228
