= 2014–15 Italian Rugby Union Championship =

The 2014–15 Italian Rugby Union Championship was the 85th season of the Italian Rugby Union Championship. Rugby Calvisano successfully defended the title after once again beating Femi-CZ Rovigo in the playoff final. This time, pipping them 11 - 10.

== Table ==
	Team	Points	Played	W	D	L	Pf:Pa	Diff.
1	Femi-CZ Rovigo	76	18	16	0	2	641:281	360
2	Rugby Calvisano	72	18	14	1	3	601:312	289
3	Marchiol Mogliano	60	18	11	2	5	584:353	231
4	Fiamme Oro Roma	52	18	11	0	7	487:398	89
5	Lafert San Donà	50	18	10	1	7	440:418	22
6	Viadana	46	18	8	3	7	442:353	89
7	Petrarca Padova	43	18	8	0	10	347:298	49
8	IMA Lazio	32	18	6	1	11	391:450	-59
9	L'Aquila RC	10	18	2	0	16	272:651	-379
10	I Cavalieri Prato	-3	18	0	0	18	120:811	-691

== Results ==
=== Matchday 1 ===
Saturday, October 4, 2014, 4:00pm
Fiamme Oro Roma	56 : 0	I Cavalieri Prato
Viadana	22 : 15	IMA Lazio
L'Aquila RC	17 : 43	Rugby Calvisano
Sunday, October 5, 2014
3:00pm
Marchiol Mogliano	16 : 16	Lafert San Donà
5:00pm
Femi-CZ Rovigo	23 : 16	Petrarca Padova

=== Matchday 2 ===
Saturday, October 11, 2014, 4:00pm
IMA Lazio	26 : 18	L'Aquila RC
Lafert San Donà	19 : 15	Femi-CZ Rovigo
Petrarca Padova	24 : 27	Viadana
Rugby Calvisano	33 : 13	Fiamme Oro Roma
I Cavalieri Prato	12 : 50	Marchiol Mogliano

=== Matchday 3 ===
Saturday, November 1, 2014, 3:00pm
Marchiol Mogliano	36 : 16	IMA Lazio
Viadana	28 : 6	Lafert San Donà
I Cavalieri Prato	10 : 43	Rugby Calvisano
Fiamme Oro Roma	24 : 13	Petrarca Padova
Femi-CZ Rovigo	74 : 0	L'Aquila RC

=== Matchday 4 ===
Saturday, November 8, 2014, 3:00pm
IMA Lazio	31 : 25	Fiamme Oro Roma
Lafert San Donà	52 : 5	I Cavalieri Prato
L'Aquila RC	3 : 38	Viadana
Rugby Calvisano	18 : 19	Femi-CZ Rovigo
Petrarca Padova	26 : 21	Marchiol Mogliano

=== Matchday 5 ===
Saturday, November 15, 2014, 3:00pm
Femi-CZ Rovigo	35 : 11	IMA Lazio
Rugby Calvisano	39 : 3	Lafert San Donà
Marchiol Mogliano	22 : 12	Viadana
I Cavalieri Prato	0 : 34	Petrarca Padova
Fiamme Oro Roma	34 : 3	L'Aquila RC

=== Matchday 6 ===
Saturday, November 29, 2014, 3:00pm
IMA Lazio	36 : 0	I Cavalieri Prato
Lafert San Donà	16 : 23	Fiamme Oro Roma
L'Aquila RC	9 : 38	Marchiol Mogliano
Sunday, November 30, 2014, 3:00pm
Viadana	11 : 16	Femi-CZ Rovigo
Petrarca Padova	15 : 16	Rugby Calvisano

=== Matchday 7 ===
Saturday, December 20, 2014, 3:00pm
Rugby Calvisano	27 : 14	IMA Lazio
Petrarca Padova	9 : 15	Lafert San Donà
Fiamme Oro Roma	45 : 27	Viadana
I Cavalieri Prato	15 : 24	L'Aquila RC
Marchiol Mogliano	42 : 17	Femi-CZ Rovigo

=== Matchday 8 ===
Saturday, January 3, 2015, 3:00pm
IMA Lazio	6 : 11	Petrarca Padova
Viadana	46 : 0	I Cavalieri Prato
Sunday, January 4, 2015, 3:00pm
L'Aquila RC	27 : 49	Lafert San Donà
Marchiol Mogliano	23 : 20	Rugby Calvisano
Femi-CZ Rovigo	19 : 10	Fiamme Oro Roma

=== Matchday 9 ===
Saturday, January 10, 2015, 3:00pm
Lafert San Donà	17 : 16	IMA Lazio
Rugby Calvisano	41 : 10	Viadana
Petrarca Padova	29 : 12	L'Aquila RC
I Cavalieri Prato	7 : 54	Femi-CZ Rovigo
Fiamme Oro Roma	21 : 31	Marchiol Mogliano

=== Matchday 10 ===
Saturday, January 31, 2015, 3:00pm
IMA Lazio	22 : 22	Viadana
I Cavalieri Prato	3 : 30	Fiamme Oro Roma
Lafert San Donà	31 : 30	Marchiol Mogliano
Rugby Calvisano	40 : 21	L'Aquila RC
Sunday, February 1, 2015, 3:00pm
Petrarca Padova	6 : 24	Femi-CZ Rovigo

=== Matchday 11 ===
Saturday, February 7, 2015, 3:00pm
Femi-CZ Rovigo	52 : 17	Lafert San Donà
Viadana	22 : 10	Petrarca Padova
Fiamme Oro Roma	21 : 55	Rugby Calvisano
Marchiol Mogliano	64 : 7	I Cavalieri Prato
Sunday, February 8, 2015, 1:00pm
L'Aquila RC	12 : 28	IMA Lazio

=== Matchday 12 ===
Saturday, March 7, 2015, 3:00pm
IMA Lazio	8 : 44	Marchiol Mogliano
Lafert San Donà	33 : 20	Viadana
Rugby Calvisano	78 : 0	I Cavalieri Prato
Petrarca Padova	32 : 10	Fiamme Oro Roma
L'Aquila RC	7 : 26	Femi-CZ Rovigo

=== Matchday 13 ===
Saturday, March 14, 2015, 3:00pm
Fiamme Oro Roma	32 : 21	IMA Lazio
I Cavalieri Prato	20 : 35	Lafert San Donà
Viadana	38 : 15	L'Aquila RC
Femi-CZ Rovigo	44 : 13	Rugby Calvisano
Marchiol Mogliano	21 : 15	Petrarca Padova

=== Matchday 14 ===
Saturday, March 21, 2015, 3:00pm
IMA Lazio	21 : 52	Femi-CZ Rovigo
Lafert San Donà	24 : 35	Rugby Calvisano
Viadana	13 : 13	Marchiol Mogliano
Petrarca Padova	24 : 0	I Cavalieri Prato
L'Aquila RC	18 : 31	Fiamme Oro Roma

=== Matchday 15 ===
Saturday, March 28, 2015, 3:00pm
I Cavalieri Prato	7 : 52	IMA Lazio
Fiamme Oro Roma	22 : 20	Lafert San Donà
Femi-CZ Rovigo	32 : 22	Viadana
Rugby Calvisano	16 : 6	Petrarca Padova
Marchiol Mogliano	53 : 8	L'Aquila RC

=== Matchday 16 ===
Saturday, April 11, 2015, 4:00pm
IMA Lazio	20 : 30	Rugby Calvisano
Lafert San Donà	19 : 22	Petrarca Padova
Viadana	21 : 23	Fiamme Oro Roma
L'Aquila RC	45 : 26	I Cavalieri Prato
Femi-CZ Rovigo	55 : 32	Marchiol Mogliano

=== Matchday 17 ===
Saturday, April 25, 2015, 4:00pm
Petrarca Padova	27 : 28	IMA Lazio
Lafert San Donà	35 : 19	L'Aquila RC
I Cavalieri Prato	8 : 38	Viadana
Rugby Calvisano	29 : 27	Marchiol Mogliano
Fiamme Oro Roma	29 : 34	Femi-CZ Rovigo

=== Matchday 18 ===
Saturday, May 9, 2015, 4:00pm
IMA Lazio	20 : 33	Lafert San Donà
Viadana	25 : 25	Rugby Calvisano
L'Aquila RC	14 : 28	Petrarca Padova
Femi-CZ Rovigo	50 : 0	I Cavalieri Prato
Marchiol Mogliano	21 : 38	Fiamme Oro Roma
