= Nardo Casolari =

Italian rugby union player

- Born: 10 January 1997 (age 29) Lugo, Italy
- Height: 1.92 m (6 ft 4 in)
- Weight: 110 kg (243 lb; 17 st 5 lb)

Rugby union career
- Position: Flanker
- Current team: Petrarca Padova
Youth career
- Rimini Rugby
- –: Romagna Rugby
- –: Rugby Firenze
Senior career
Years	Team	Apps	(Points)
2015−2016	L'Aquila	6	(0)
2016−2017	Lazio	8	(5)
2017−2021	Calvisano	49	(35)
2020	→Zebre	2	(0)
2021−	Petrarca Padova		
- Correct as of 29 Dec 2020
International career
Years	Team	Apps	(Points)
2017	Italy Under 20	4	(0)
- Correct as of 7 Nov 2020

Nardo Casolari (born 10 January 1997, in Lugo) is an Italian rugby union player. His usual position is as a Flanker and he currently plays for Petrarca Padova in Top10.

In 2020–21 Pro14 season, he was named as Additional Player for Zebre.

In 2017, Casolari was named in the Italy Under 20 squad.
