= Tobie Botes =

South African rugby union player (born 1984)

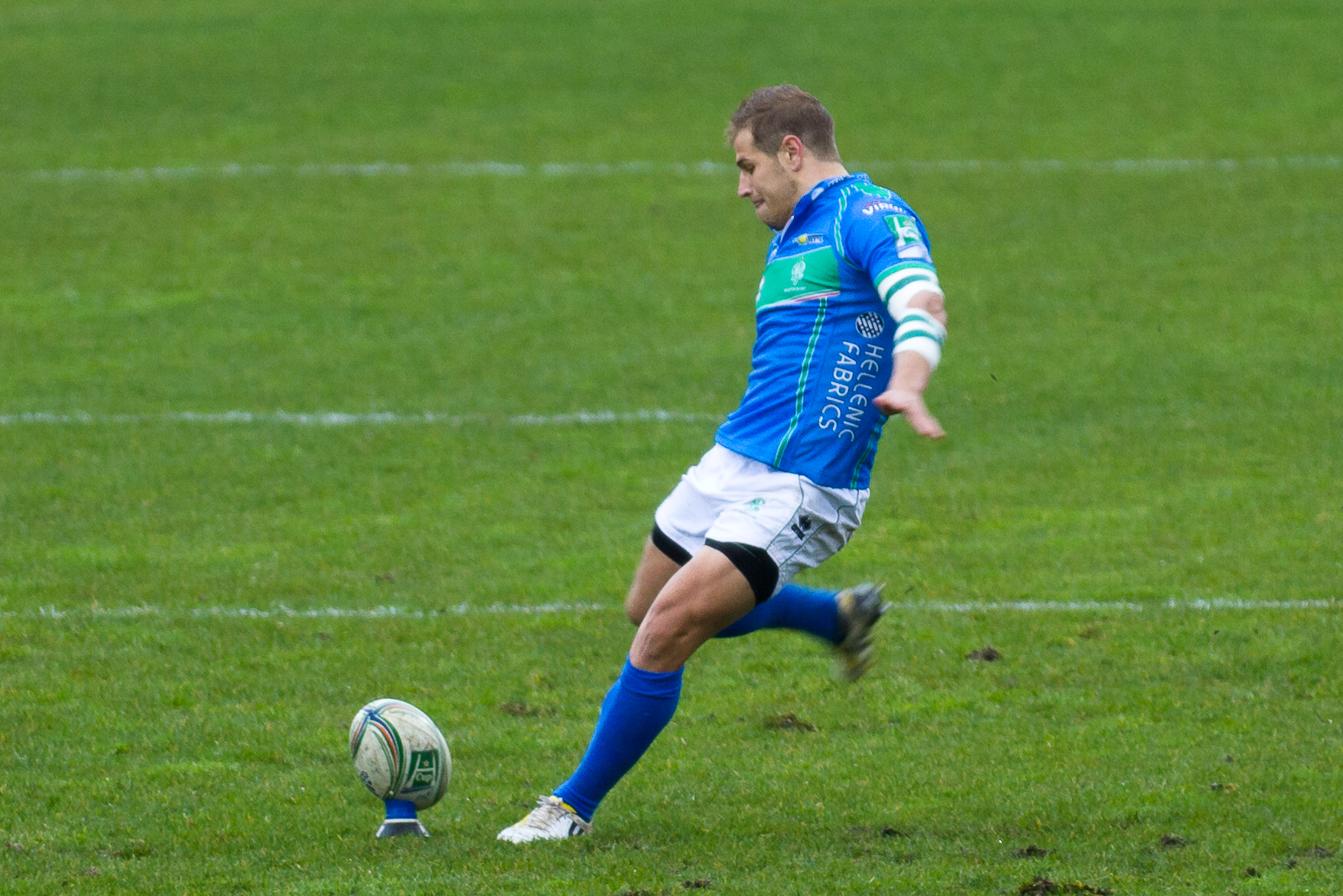
- Full name: Wietz Tobias Botes
- Born: 26 April 1984 (age 42) Worcester, Western Cape, South Africa
- Height: 1.81 m (5 ft 11 1/2 in)
- Weight: 110 kg (240 lb; 17 st 5 lb)
- School: Boland Agricultural High School, Paarl

Rugby union career
- Position(s): Scrum-half, Fly-half
Youth career
- 2004: Boland Cavaliers
- 2005: Griquas
Senior career
Years	Team	Apps	(Points)
2004	Boland Cavaliers	2	(0)
2006–2008	Griquas	45	(100)
2008	Cheetahs	3	(0)
2008–2014	Treviso	100	(328)
2014	Eastern Province Kings	8	(7)
- Correct as of 24 March 2015
International career
Years	Team	Apps	(Points)
2012–2014	Italy	22	(8)
- Correct as of 24 March 2015

Wietz Tobias Botes (born 26 April 1984, in Worcester) in a South African-born rugby union player, who most recently played for the Eastern Province Kings. He normally plays as a scrum-half or fly-half.

Despite being born in South Africa, he played in 22 test matches for Italy between 2012 and 2014.

== Career ==
=== Youth rugby ===
Botes started off his career at Wellington-based side the Boland Cavaliers, representing them in the 2004 Under-20 Provincial Championship. In 2005, he played for Griquas U21 in the Under-21 Provincial Championship.

=== Senior career ===
==== Boland Cavaliers ====
He made his senior debut for the Boland Cavaliers during the 2004 Vodacom Shield competition, starting their match against Western Province at Newlands Stadium, Cape Town and made one substitute appearance the following week against the Pumas.

==== Griquas / Cheetahs ====
He moved to Kimberley to join the Griquas in 2005. After a season playing for their Under-21 side, he graduated to their senior side, making six appearances during the 2006 Vodacom Cup competition, scoring one try, three conversions and a penalty. He made his Currie Cup debut during the 2006 Currie Cup Premier Division, coming on as a substitute against the Blue Bulls. His first start in the Currie Cup competition came the following week against Western Province.

After a further eight appearances in the 2007 Vodacom Cup, Botes firmly established himself as a first-team regular, appearing in eleven of Griquas' matches during the 2007 Currie Cup Premier Division.

In 2008, Botes was also included in the Cheetahs squad for the 2008 Super 14 season. After being an unused substitute in their opening match against the Lions, his Super Rugby debut came during their second round match against the Force in Bloemfontein. He also played off the bench in their match against the Crusaders in Christchurch, and made his first start later in the competition against the Bulls. During this time, he also made five appearances for Griquas in the 2008 Vodacom Cup and later played in nine matches for them during the 2008 Currie Cup Premier Division competition.

==== Treviso ====
In 2008, it was announced that Botes would join Italian Super 10 side for the 2008–09 season. He immediately established himself as a first-choice regular and scored 328 points in a hundred appearances for the club between 2008 and 2014. In the six seasons he spent at the club, they won the Super 10 on two occasions – in 2008–09 and 2009–10 – and also won the Italian Cup in 2010.

He was the top scorer for Benetton Treviso during the 2010–11 Celtic League with 127 points, making a total of 48 appearances in the competition during his spell at the club.

==== Eastern Province Kings ====
He returned to South Africa by joining the Eastern Province Kings prior to the 2014 Currie Cup Premier Division season. He made eight appearances for the Kings in the competition, but wasn't named in the training squad for the 2015 season. Instead, he concentrated on farming at his family farm near Worcester. It was initially indicated that he would to this for the first half of 2015 before returning to action for the EP Kings for the 2015 Currie Cup Premier Division, but it was later confirmed that he would not return to Port Elizabeth.

=== Italy ===
Although he was born in South Africa, Botes played international rugby for Italy. In January 2012, he was called up to the Italian squad as cover for the 2012 Six Nations Championship.

He was named amongst the replacements for the opening game against France on 4 February 2012 and made his debut, coming on as a replacement just before the hour mark and kicking a penalty shortly after coming on to score his first international points in a 12–30 loss. He made a total of five appearances during the 2012 Six Nations Championship, scoring eight points and also played in three matches against touring sides Tonga, New Zealand and Australia in November 2012.

He once again appeared in all five of Italy's matches during the 2013 Six Nations Championship, helping them to two victories during the competition. In June 2013, he was included in a touring squad to South Africa to play in a quadrangular tournament also involving Samoa and Scotland, but could not help Italy achieve a victory in any of those matches. He also played in three 2013 end-of-year rugby union internationals against Australia, Fiji and Argentina.

He made three more appearances for Italy during the 2014 Six Nations Championship for a total of 22 test matches, scoring eight points through one conversion and two penalties.
