= Matteo Falsaperla =

- Born: 5 May 1990 (age 36) Rome, Italy
- Height: 1.81 m (5 ft 11 in)
- Weight: 86 kg (190 lb; 13 st 8 lb)

Rugby union career
- Position: Fullback
- Current team: Mogliano
Senior career
Years	Team	Apps	(Points)
2009−2010	Roma Olimpic	2	(0)
2012−2013	L'Aquila	15	(5)
2013−2014	I Cavalieri Prato	16	(26)
2014−2019	San Donà	77	(70)
2019−2021	Valorugby Emilia	14	(5)
2021−2022	Mogliano	13	(5)
- Correct as of 15 November 2020
International career
Years	Team	Apps	(Points)
2013−2018	Italy Sevens	89	(37)
- Correct as of 15 November 2020

Matteo Flasaperla (born 5 May 1990 in Rome) is an Italian rugby union player. His usual position is as a Fullback and he played for Mogliano in Top10 in 2021−22 season.

From 2019 to 2021, he played for Valorugby Emilia in Top12.

From 2013 to 2018 Falsaperla was part of the Italy Sevens squad.
