= 2013–14 Italian Rugby Union Championship =

The 2013–14 Italian Rugby Union Championship was the 84th season of the Italian Rugby Union Championship.

== Table ==
	Team	Points	Played	W	D	L	Pf:Pa	Diff.
1	Rugby Calvisano	88	20	18	1	1	703:261	442
2	Femi-CZ Rovigo	83	20	17	1	2	665:278	387
3	Marchiol Mogliano	63	20	13	1	6	469:306	163
4	Viadana	61	20	11	1	8	509:343	166
5	Petrarca Padova	60	20	13	0	7	481:335	146
6	I Cavalieri Prato	51	20	11	0	9	465:420	45
7	Fiamme Oro Roma	43	20	9	0	11	435:462	-27
8	IMA Lazio	33	20	6	0	14	400:510	-110
9	Lafert San Donà	31	20	6	0	14	345:455	-110
10	Conad Reggio	16	20	3	3	17	264:612	-348
11	Unione Rugby Capitolina	5	20	1	0	19	153:907	-754

== Results ==
=== Matchday 1 ===
Saturday, September 21, 2013, 4:00pm
Rugby Calvisano	36 : 0	Lafert San Donà
I Cavalieri Prato	22 : 11	Petrarca Padova
Marchiol Mogliano	50 : 6	Unione Rugby Capitolina
Femi-CZ Rovigo	47 : 9	Fiamme Oro Roma
Conad Reggio	19 : 41	Viadana

=== Matchday 2 ===
Saturday, September 28, 2013, 4:00pm
Unione Rugby Capitolina	26 : 10	Conad Reggio
Viadana	14 : 19	Femi-CZ Rovigo
Fiamme Oro Roma	17 : 34	Marchiol Mogliano
Lafert San Donà	31 : 15	I Cavalieri Prato
Petrarca Padova	16 : 9	IMA Lazio

=== Matchday 3 ===
Saturday, October 5, 2013, 4:00pm
Conad Reggio	9 : 39	Petrarca Padova
Viadana	33 : 15	Lafert San Donà
Marchiol Mogliano	15 – :	Rugby Calvisano
I Cavalieri Prato	21 : 3	Fiamme Oro Roma
IMA Lazio	20 : 3	Unione Rugby Capitolina

=== Matchday 4 ===
Saturday, October 26, 2013, 4:00pm
Lafert San Donà	29 : 3	Conad Reggio
Petrarca Padova	22 : 5	Viadana
Fiamme Oro Roma	21 : 17	IMA Lazio
Unione Rugby Capitolina	3 : 38	I Cavalieri Prato
Sunday, October 27, 2013, 4:00pm
Rugby Calvisano	28 : 28	Femi-CZ Rovigo

=== Matchday 5 ===
Saturday, November 2, 2013, 3:00pm
Conad Reggio	22 : 25	Fiamme Oro Roma
Viadana	57 : 0	Unione Rugby Capitolina
Femi-CZ Rovigo	26 : 5	Marchiol Mogliano
IMA Lazio	13 : 38	Rugby Calvisano
Lafert San Donà	23 : 25	Petrarca Padova

=== Matchday 6 ===
Saturday, November 9, 2013, 3:00pm
Rugby Calvisano	47 : 13	Conad Reggio
Femi-CZ Rovigo	45 : 22	IMA Lazio
Marchiol Mogliano	19 : 27	I Cavalieri Prato
Fiamme Oro Roma	28 : 15	Petrarca Padova
Unione Rugby Capitolina	11 : 31	Lafert San Donà

=== Matchday 7 ===
Saturday, November 30, 2013, 3:00pm
Viadana	32 : 21	Fiamme Oro Roma
IMA Lazio	12 : 15	Marchiol Mogliano
I Cavalieri Prato	16 : 19	Rugby Calvisano
Petrarca Padova	27 : 21	Unione Rugby Capitolina
Sunday, December 1, 2013, 3:00pm
Conad Reggio	13 : 26	Femi-CZ Rovigo

=== Matchday 8 ===
Saturday, December 21, 2013, 3:00pm
IMA Lazio	3 : 28	Viadana
Femi-CZ Rovigo	40 : 17	I Cavalieri Prato
Marchiol Mogliano	15 : 10	Petrarca Padova
Fiamme Oro Roma	33 : 25	Lafert San Donà
Rugby Calvisano	61 : 0	Unione Rugby Capitolina

=== Matchday 9 ===
Saturday, January 4, 2014, 3:00pm
I Cavalieri Prato	27 : 15	IMA Lazio
Sunday, January 5, 2014, 3:00pm
Conad Reggio	6 : 19	Marchiol Mogliano
Lafert San Donà	0 : 33	Femi-CZ Rovigo
Monday, January 6, 2014, 3:00pm
Viadana	16 : 22	Rugby Calvisano
Unione Rugby Capitolina	6 : 43	Fiamme Oro Roma

=== Matchday 10 ===
Saturday, January 25, 2014, 3:00pm
IMA Lazio	38 : 10	Conad Reggio
I Cavalieri Prato	22 : 14	Viadana
Femi-CZ Rovigo	39 : 0	Petrarca Padova
Marchiol Mogliano	28 : 13	Lafert San Donà
Rugby Calvisano	24 : 13	Fiamme Oro Roma

=== Matchday 11 ===
Sunday, February 2, 2014, 3:00pm
Conad Reggio	10 : 28	I Cavalieri Prato
Viadana	13 : 13	Marchiol Mogliano
Unione Rugby Capitolina	5 : 40	Femi-CZ Rovigo
Lafert San Donà	16 : 6	IMA Lazio
Petrarca Padova	19 :29	Rugby Calvisano

=== Matchday 12 ===
Saturday, February 15, 2014, 3:00pm
Lafert San Donà	3 : 35	Rugby Calvisano
Petrarca Padova	23 : 10	I Cavalieri Prato
Unione Rugby Capitolina	3 : 43	Marchiol Mogliano
Fiamme Oro Roma	18 : 33	Femi-CZ Rovigo
Viadana	24 : 0	Conad Reggio

=== Matchday 13 ===
Saturday, February 15, 2014, 3:00pm
Conad Reggio	31 : 3	Unione Rugby Capitolina
Femi-CZ Rovigo	26 : 20	Viadana
Marchiol Mogliano	8 : 3	Fiamme Oro Roma
I Cavalieri Prato	12 : 3	Lafert San Donà
IMA Lazio	16 : 28	Petrarca Padova

=== Matchday 14 ===
Sunday, March 9, 2014, 3:00pm
Petrarca Padova	45 : 13	Conad Reggio
Lafert San Donà	22 : 23	Viadana
Rugby Calvisano	37 : 3	Marchiol Mogliano
Fiamme Oro Roma	27 : 16	I Cavalieri Prato
Unione Rugby Capitolina	7 : 28	IMA Lazio

=== Matchday 15 ===
Sunday, March 16, 2014, 3:00pm
Conad Reggio	15 : 10	Lafert San Donà
Viadana	10 : 20	Petrarca Padova
Femi-CZ Rovigo	6 : 18	Calvisano
IMA Lazio	17 : 33	Fiamme Oro Roma
I Cavalieri Prato	71 : 15	Unione Rugby Capitolina

=== Matchday 16 ===
Saturday, March 22, 2014, 3:00pm
Fiamme Oro Roma	13 : 9	Conad Reggio
Unione Rugby Capitolina	7 : 33	Viadana
Marchiol Mogliano	17 : 24	Femi-CZ Rovigo
Rugby Calvisano	44 : 24	IMA Lazio
Petrarca Padova	19 : 8	Lafert San Donà

=== Matchday 17 ===
Saturday, March 29, 2014, 3:00pm
Conad Reggio	0 : 45	Rugby Calvisano
IMA Lazio	26 : 62	Femi-CZ Rovigo
I Cavalieri Prato	16 : 10	Marchiol Mogliano
Petrarca Padova	34 : 15	Fiamme Oro Roma
Lafert San Donà	71 : 10	Unione Rugby Capitolina

=== Matchday 18 ===
Saturday, April 5, 2014, 4:00pm
Femi-CZ Rovigo	31 : 27	Conad Reggio
Fiamme Oro Roma	24 : 31	Viadana
Marchiol Mogliano	37 : 22	IMA Lazio
Rugby Calvisano	52 : 7	I Cavalieri Prato
Unione Rugby Capitolina	0 : 71	Petrarca Padova

=== Matchday 19 ===
Saturday, April 12, 2014, 4:00pm
Viadana	26 : 30	IMA Lazio
I Cavalieri Prato	19 : 23	Femi-CZ Rovigo
Petrarca Padova	23 : 24	Marchiol Mogliano
Lafert San Donà	19 : 14	Fiamme Oro Roma
Unione Rugby Capitolina	12 : 61	Rugby Calvisano

=== Matchday 20 ===
Saturday, April 26, 2014, 4:00pm
Marchiol Mogliano	59 : 10	Conad Reggio
Rugby Calvisano	32 : 26	Viadana
Femi-CZ Rovigo	27 : 3	Lafert San Donà
Fiamme Oro Roma	45 : 15	Unione Rugby Capitolina
IMA Lazio	34 : 17	I Cavalieri Prato

=== Matchday 21 ===
Saturday, May 3, 2014, 4:00pm
Conad Reggio	20 : 14	IMA Lazio
Viadana	44 : 14	I Cavalieri Prato
Petrarca Padova	17 : 14	Femi-CZ Rovigo
Lafert San Donà	6 : 43	Marchiol Mogliano
Fiamme Oro Roma	30 : 37	Calvisano

=== Matchday 22 ===
Saturday, May 10, 2014, 4:00pm
I Cavalieri Prato	50 : 24	Conad Reggio
marchiol Mogliano	12 : 19	Viadana
Femi-CZ Rovigo	76 : 0	Unione Rugby Capitolina
IMA Lazio	34 : 17	Lafert San Donà
Rugby Calvisano	25 : 17	Petrarca Padova
