= Romulo Acosta =

Argentine rugby union player

- Born: 1 September 1992 (age 34) Tucuman, Argentina
- Height: 1.83 m (6 ft 0 in)
- Weight: 112 kg (17 st 9 lb; 247 lb)

Rugby union career
- Position: Prop
- Current team: Rugby Lyons Piacenza
Youth career
- Los Tarcos
Amateur team(s)
Years	Team	Apps	(Points)
- Unión de Rugby de Tucumán
Senior career
Years	Team	Apps	(Points)
2012−2013	Los Tarcos		
2013−2014	Petrarca Padova	6	(10)
2014	→Benetton Treviso	3	(0)
2014−2015	Benetton Treviso	18	(0)
2015−2019	Petrarca Padova	60	(48)
2017	→Benetton Treviso	1	(0)
2019−	Rugby Lyons Piacenza		
- Correct as of 5 June 2020
- Correct as of 5 June 2020

Romulo Acosta (Tucuman, 1 September 1992) is an Argentine born rugby union player. His usual position is as a Prop and he currently plays for Rugby Lyons Piacenza in Top12.

In the 2014–15 Pro12 season, he played for Benetton Treviso. Acosta he also played for Benetton Treviso, as Additional Player in 2014 and 2017.
