= Alberto Saccardo =

Italian rugby union player

- Born: 10 January 1986 (age 40) Camposampiero, Italy
- Height: 1.92 m (6 ft 4 in)
- Weight: 100 kg (220 lb; 15 st 10 lb)

Rugby union career
- Position: Lock
- Current team: Rangers Vicenza
Youth career
- Petrarca Padova
Senior career
Years	Team	Apps	(Points)
2006−2008	Petrarca Padova	16	(10)
2008−2011	Roma Olimpic	46	(10)
2011−2014	I Cavalieri Prato	77	(15)
2014	→Zebre	1	(0)
2014−2016	Mogliano	34	(5)
2016−2020	Petrarca Padova	62	(10)
2020−	Rangers Vicenza		
- Correct as of 1 June 2020
International career
Years	Team	Apps	(Points)
2006	Italy Under 21	1	(0)
- Correct as of 1 June 2020

Alberto Saccardo (born 10 January 1986 in Camposampiero) is an Italian rugby union player. His usual position is as a Lock and he currently plays for Rangers Vicenza in Serie A.

For 2013–14 Pro12 season, he was an Additional Player for Zebre.

In 2006, Saccardo was also named in the Italy Under 21 squad.
