= Brendan Williams (rugby union) =

Australian rugby union player (born 1978)

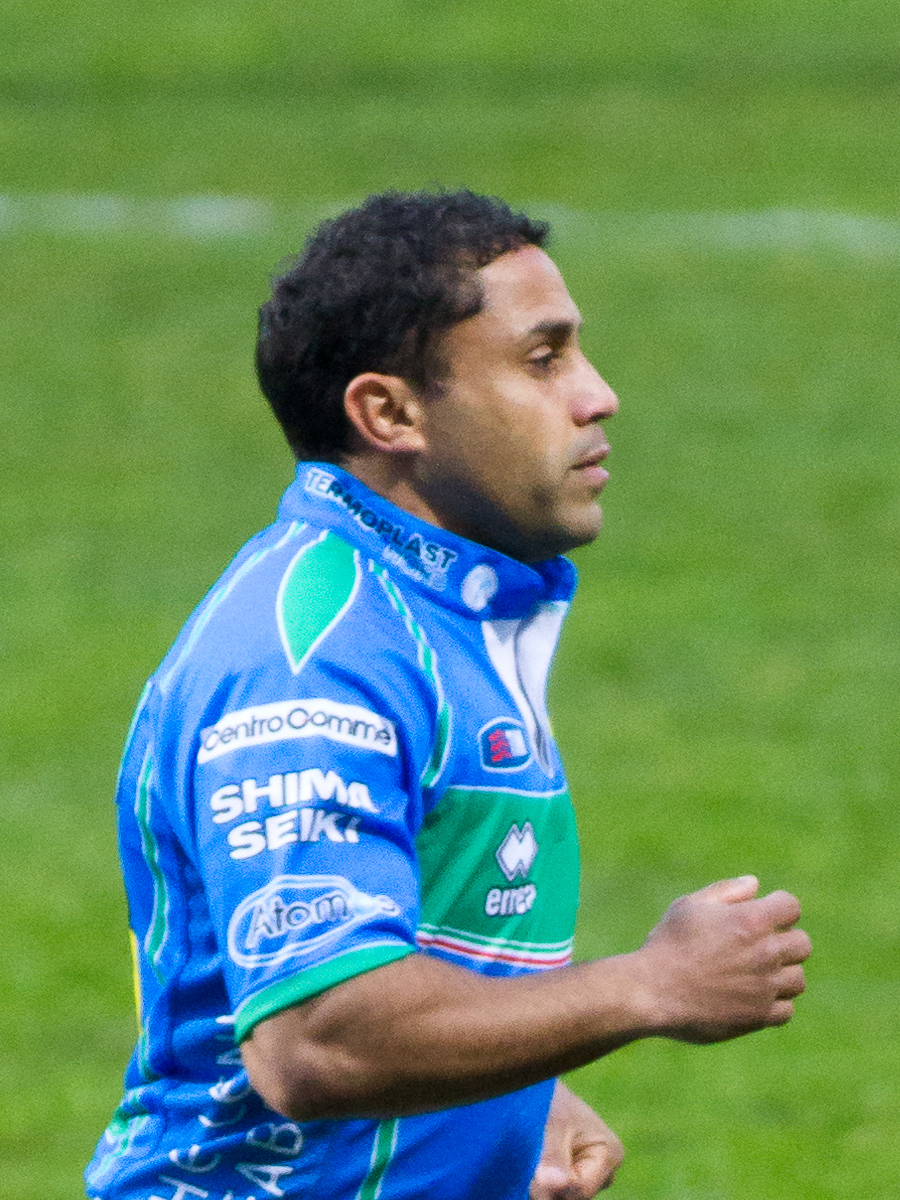
- Full name: Brendan C. Williams
- Born: 21 May 1978 (age 48) Urbenville, Australia
- Height: 170 cm (5 ft 7 in)
- Weight: 76 kg (12 st 0 lb; 168 lb)

Rugby union career
- Position: Fullback
- Current team: Treviso
Senior career
Years	Team	Apps	(Points)
1997–2001	Randwick		
1999	Brumbies	1	(0)
1999–2000	Petrarca	20	(116)
2001	Waratahs	8	(5)
2001–2002	Petrarca	19	(62)
2002–2014	Treviso	250	(582)
- Correct as of 21 May 2014
International career
Years	Team	Apps	(Points)
1998–2001	NSWRU	1	(5)
1998	Australia Sevens		
- Correct as of 21 May 2014
Medal record
Men's rugby sevens
Representing Australia
Commonwealth Games
Bronze medal – third place	1998 Kuala Lumpur	Team competition

Brendan Williams (born 21 May 1978 in Urbenville) is a retired Australian-born rugby union player. He played at Fullback.

He first came to stardom as Australian Under 21s player in 1995. Signed to Randwick Rugby Club in 1998, a club he played for since 1995, he was awarded The Daily Telegraph Rookie of the Year award. He later moved to New South Wales Waratahs.

He was included in the Australian Commonwealth Games Rugby Sevens twice in consecutive games, becoming a bronze medalist with his teammates.

He has also played as an international rugby player, notably playing for Petrarca Rugby based in Padova, Italy and Benetton Treviso, Italy in the professional Italian rugby union as a wing (fullback).

Brendan retired from professional rugby playing his last game on 2 May 2014, at home against Glasgow Warriors losing the match 16-38.

He is in both Rugby 08 and Rugby 06 as B.Wallace.

== Honours ==
- National Championship of Excellence
  - Champions Benetton Treviso: 2002–2003, 2003–2004, 2005–2006, 2006–2007, 2008–2009
- Coppa Italia
  - Champions Benetton Treviso: 2004–2005, 2009–2010
- Italian Super Cup
  - Champions Benetton Treviso: 2006, 2009
