= Massimo Cioffi =

Italian rugby player (born 1997)

- Born: 24 May 1997 (age 29) Telese Terme, Italy
- Height: 1.75 m (5 ft 9 in)
- Weight: 85 kg (13 st 5 lb; 187 lb)

Rugby union career
- Position: Wing
- Current team: Lazio
Youth career
- Rugby Benevento
Senior career
Years	Team	Apps	(Points)
2015−2016	F.I.R. Academy		
2016−2017	Lazio	13	(54)
2017−2021	Rovigo Delta	71	(142)
2019	→Zebre	1	(0)
2021−2022	Valorugby Emilia	10	(5)
2022−2023	Petrarca Padova	7	(15)
2023	Fiamme Oro	2	(0)
2024	Lazio		
- Correct as of 22 May 2020
International career
Years	Team	Apps	(Points)
2017	Italy Under 20	8	(17)
2018	Emerging Italy	3	(12)
- Correct as of 22 May 2020
National sevens team
Years	Team		Comps
2018−	Italy Sevens		19
- Correct as of 30 Apr 23

Massimo Cioffi (Telese Terme, 24 May 1997) is an Italian rugby union player. His usual position is as a Wing and he currently plays for Lazio in Italian Serie A Elite.

Under contract with Rovigo Delta, for 2019–20 Pro14 season, he named as Additional Player for Zebre in Pro 14. He played with Valorugby Emilia in Top10, in 2021−2022 season, and for Petrarca Padova, in 2022−23 season. In summer 2023 he signed for Fiamme Oro.

In 2017 Cioffi was named in the Italy Under 20 squad and from 2018 he is part of the Italy Sevens squad also to participate at the Qualifying Tournament for the 2020 Summer Olympics. In 2018, he was also named in the Emerging Italy squad for the World Rugby Nations Cup.
