= Michele Sepe =

Italian rugby union player

- Born: 8 October 1986 (age 40) Rome, Italy
- Height: 1.84 m (6 ft 1/2 in)
- Weight: 90 kg (198 lb)

Rugby union career
- Position: Wing
- Current team: Benetton Treviso
Senior career
Years	Team	Apps	(Points)
2004–2005	Lazio		
2005–2009	Capitolina	44	(70)
2009–2010	Viadana	13	(5)
2010–2012	Benetton Treviso	13	(5)
2012−2013	Cavalieri Prato	23	(45)
2013−2018	Fiamme Oro Rugby	59	(65)
- Correct as of 22 March 2010
International career
Years	Team	Apps	(Points)
2009−11	Emerging Italy	5	(5)
2006–11	Italy	3	(5)
- Correct as of 10 September 2010
Coaching career
- Years: Team
- 2018−: Fiamme Oro Rugby Assistant Coach

Michele Sepe (born 8 October 1986) is an Italian rugby union player. Sepe, who is a wing, plays club rugby for Fiamme Oro Rugby. He made his debut for Italy against Japan on 11 June 2006.

== Biography ==
Sepe began his career at Lazio, with whom he made his debut during the 2004–05 season. He subsequently moved to Capitolina of the Super 10 (now Top12) in 2005. He moved to Viadana in the summer of 2009. He spent one year at Viadana before moving to Benetton Treviso in June 2010.
