= 2021–22 Top10 =

Italian rugby event

- Countries: Italy
- Date: 24 September 2021 – 28 May 2022
- Champions: Petrarca (14th title)
- Runners-up: Rovigo
- Relegated: Lazio
- Matches played: 95
- Top point scorer: (South Africa) Abner van Reenen (206)
- Top try scorer: (Italy) Lorenzo Bruno (South Africa) Luhandre Luus (13)

Official website
- www.federugby.it

The 2021–22 Top10 was the 92nd edition of the Italian rugby union championship. Petrarca Rugby won their 14th title, after beating defending champions Rugby Rovigo Delta 19–6.

== Teams ==
Club	City	Stadium	Previous season
Calvisano	Calvisano	Stadio San Michele	Semifinals (3rd in league)
Colorno	Colorno	Stadio Giulio Maini	9th
Fiamme Oro	Rome	Centro Sportivo Polizia di Stato	7th
Lazio	Rome	Centro Sportivo Giulio Onesti	10th
Lyons	Piacenza	Stadio Walter Beltrametti	8th
Mogliano	Mogliano Veneto	Stadio Maurizio Quaggia	6th
Petrarca	Padua	Centro sportivo Memo Geremia	2nd
Rovigo	Rovigo	Stadio Comunale Mario Battaglini	1st
Valorugby Emilia	Reggio Emilia	Stadio Mirabello	Semifinals (4th in league)
Viadana	Viadana	Stadio Luigi Zaffanella	5th

== Competition format ==
The top four teams at the end of the regular season (after all the teams played one another twice, once at home, once away) enter a knockout stage to decide the Champions of Italy. This consists of two rounds: semi-finals and final.

A new bonus points system was introduced in this season:

- 4 points for a win.
- 2 points for a draw.
- 1 bonus point for winning while scoring at least 3 more tries than the opponent.
- 1 bonus point for losing by 5 points (or fewer).

== Table ==
Pos	Team	Games				Points			Bonus points	Table points	Qualification
Pos	Team	Pld	W	D	L	PF	PA	PD	Bonus points	Table points	Qualification
1	Petrarca	18	16	0	2	623	304	+319	14	78	Play-off
2	Rovigo	18	14	0	4	604	344	+260	11	67	Play-off
3	Valorugby Emilia	18	13	0	5	634	428	+206	14	66	Play-off
4	Calvisano	18	11	1	6	529	407	+122	9	55	Play-off
5	Colorno	18	9	1	8	553	560	-7	7	45	
6	Fiamme Oro	18	9	0	9	497	533	-36	7	41	
7	Viadana	18	5	1	12	417	577	−160	6	28	
8	Lyons	18	6	1	11	410	619	−209	2	28	
9	Mogliano	18	4	0	14	415	600	−185	7	23	
10	Lazio	18	1	0	17	437	747	−310	7	12	Serie A 2022–23

== Results ==
Home \ Away	CAL	COL	FFO	LAZ	LYO	MOG	PET	ROV	VAL	VIA
Calvisano	—	39–22	19–17	50–28	28–28	45–16	26–41	21–29	26–13	45–18
Colorno	21–14	—	29–28	34–25	62–13	37–30	23–39	26–33	41–61	27–27
Fiamme Oro	18–30	29–43	—	49–40	25–15	44–31	12–49	12–43	23–24	27–24
Lazio	10–38	20–39	28–33	—	33–34	25–30	25–50	17–43	21–57	24–34
Lyons	22–19	41–31	10–48	22–31	—	35–19	10–35	30–19	29–33	21–22
Mogliano	16–33	24–27	36–37	35–24	38–24	—	12–34	6–27	36–26	32–39
Petrarca	18–15	36–19	21–13	47–5	45–13	42–10	—	27–25	26–24	29–10
Rovigo	40–17	34–28	28–31	57–17	49–7	21–12	24–20	—	20–21	54–17
Valorugby Emilia	26–27	42–19	36–18	49–26	56–21	45–19	24–23	28–29	—	38–6
Viadana	24–35	23–25	27–33	46–38	26–35	35–13	14–41	7–29	18–31	—

Source: Federugby (in Italian)
Legend: Blue = home team win; Yellow = draw; Red = away team win.

== Championship play-offs ==
Semifinals
4	Calvisano	12	24	36
1	Petrarca	16	43	59
3	Valorugby Emilia	9	22	31
2	Rovigo	16	24	40

Finals
1	Petrarca	19
2	Rovigo	6
