= Manfredi Albanese =

Italian rugby union player

- Full name: Manfredi Albanese Ginammi
- Born: 25 July 2001 (age 25) Rome, Italy
- Height: 174 cm (5 ft 9 in)
- Weight: 83 kg (183 lb; 13 st 1 lb)

Rugby union career
- Position: Scrum-half
- Current team: Lazio
Youth career
- Lazio
Senior career
Years	Team	Apps	(Points)
2018–2020	Lazio	17	(0)
2020–2022	Calvisano	31	(52)
2022–2023	Benetton	7	(5)
2023–	Lazio		
- Correct as of 28 Jan 2023
International career
Years	Team	Apps	(Points)
2020–2021	Italy U20	8	(11)
2022	Emerging Italy	1	(8)
2022	Italy	3	(0)
- Correct as of 6 November 2022

Manfredi Albanese Ginammi (born 25 July 2001) is an Italian professional rugby union player who primarily plays scrum-half for Lazio in the Serie A Elite.

== Professional career ==
Albanese originally played for Lazio. He joined Calvisano in 2020, and joined Zebre Parma as a permit player for the latter stages of the 2021–22 United Rugby Championship although didn't make an appearance.

He played for Benetton in the United Rugby Championship in 2022−23 season.

In 2020 and 2021 Albanese was named in Italy Under 20 squad for the annual Six Nations Under 20s Championship. On 8 December 2021, he was selected by Alessandro Troncon to be part of an Emerging Italy 27-man squad for the 2021 end-of-year rugby union internationals. On 10 January 2023, he was named in Italy A squad for a uncapped test against Romania A.

On 30 May 2022, Albanese was selected by Kieran Crowley to be part of an Italy 33-man squad for the 2022 mid-year rugby union tests. He made his debut against Portugal. He represented Italy on 3 occasions in 2022.

On 7 March 2023 Albanese announced that he will retire from professional rugby at the end of the 2022-2023 season to move back to his native Rome and focus on a career in business.
