= Angelo Esposito (rugby union) =

Italy international rugby union player

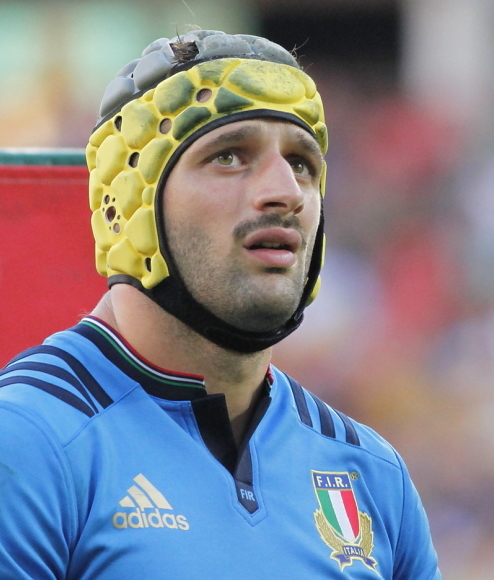
- Born: 14 June 1993 (age 33) Casandrino, Campania, Italy
- Height: 1.87 m (6 ft 2 in)
- Weight: 90 kg (14 st 2 lb; 198 lb)

Rugby union career
- Position(s): Wing, Fullback
Youth career
- 2009–2012: Ruggers Tarvisium
Senior career
Years	Team	Apps	(Points)
2011–2012	F.I.R. Academy		
2012–2021	Benetton	101	(95)
2021–2024	Petrarca Padova	39	(65)
- Correct as of 10 April 2021
International career
Years	Team	Apps	(Points)
2011−2013	Italy U20	14	(5)
2011	Emerging Italy	1	(0)
2014–2019	Italy	20	(15)
- Correct as of 25 November 2017

Angelo Esposito (born 14 June 1993) is an Italian former rugby union player. Playing most recently for Petrarca Padova in the Italian Top 10 league, Esposito also played for the Italian national rugby team between 2014 and 2019. His playing position was winger, however played several times at fullback.

From 2012 to 2021, Esposito played with Italian Pro14 team Benetton. In the Summer of 2021 he signed for Italian Serie A Elite team Petrarca Padova until 2024.

From 2011 to 2013, Esposito was named in the Italy U20 squad. and in the 2011 for the Emerging Italy squad. In January 2012 he was called up to the Italian team for the 2012 Six Nations Championship.
