= Ludovico Nitoglia =

Italian rugby union player

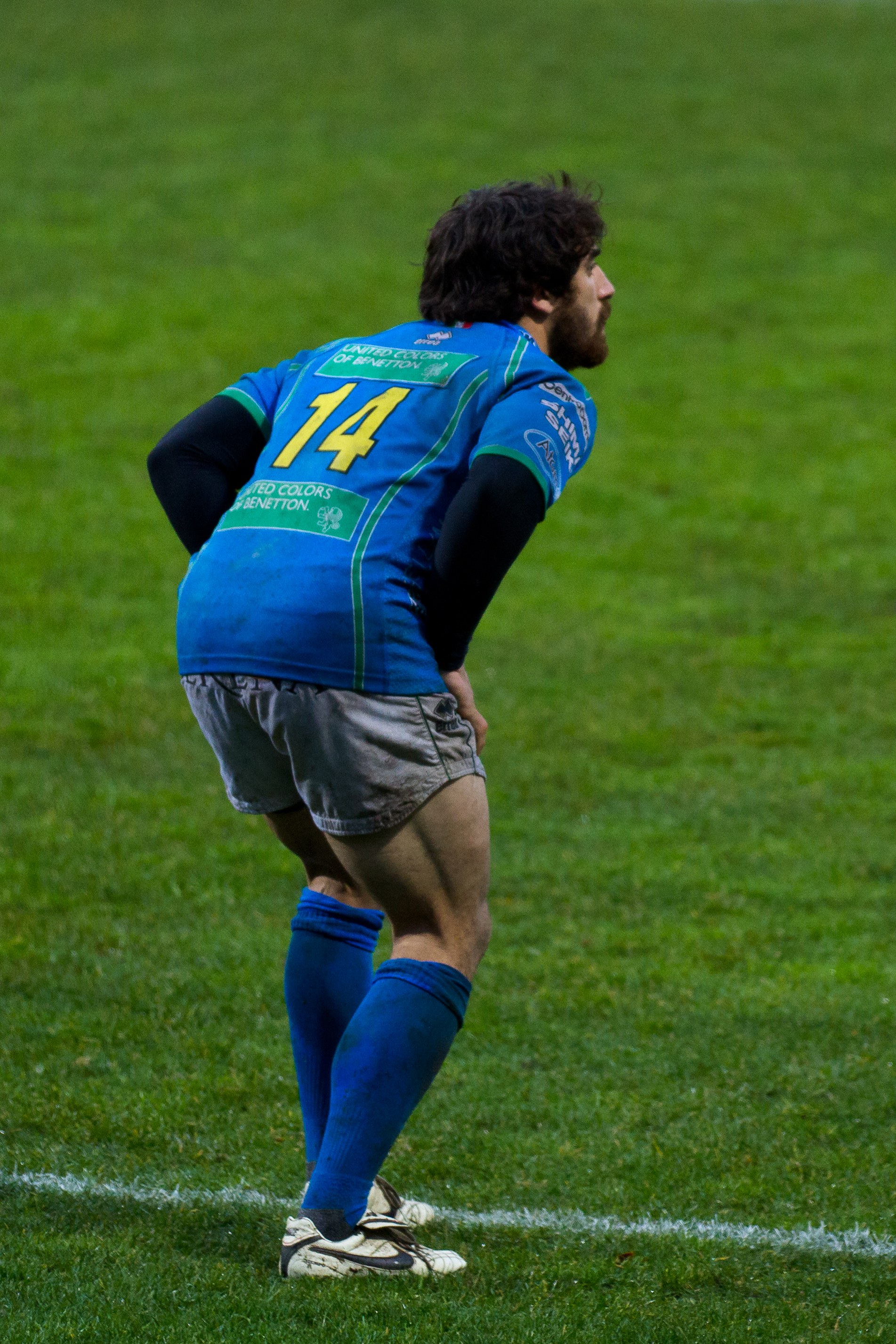
- Full name: Ludovico Maria Nitoglia
- Born: 27 October 1983 (age 43) Rome, Italy
- Height: 179 cm (5 ft 10 in)
- Weight: 86 kg (190 lb; 13 st 8 lb)

Rugby union career
- Position: Wing
Senior career
| Years | Team | Apps | (Points) |
| 2001–04 | Lazio | 145 | (39) |
| 2004–09 | Calvisano | 55 | (110) |
| 2009–10 | L'Aquila | 17 | (30) |
| 2010–16 | Benetton | 130 | (110) |
- Correct as of 6 May 2016
International career
| Years | Team | Apps | (Points) |
| 2004-2006 | Italy | 17 | (0) |
- Correct as of 25 June 2013

Ludovico Maria Nitoglia (Italian pronunciation: [ludoˈviːko niˈtɔʎʎa]; born 27 October 1983) is an Italian former rugby union player. He played as a wing.

With Calvisano, Nitoglia won two Italian rugby championships in 2005 and 2008. He plays for Benetton Treviso in the Pro14, since 2010/11 to 2015/16, when he finished his career.

He had 17 caps for Italy, from 2004 to 2006, without scoring. He played at the Six Nations Championship in 2005 and 2006, for 10 caps. He wasn't called for the 2007 Rugby World Cup and since then never returned to the national team, despite several callings.
