= Filippo Alongi =

Italy international rugby union player

- Born: 27 April 2000 (age 26) Pietrasanta, Italy
- Height: 1.87 m (6 ft 2 in)
- Weight: 121 kg (19 st 1 lb; 267 lb)

Rugby union career
- Position: Prop
- Current team: Petrarca Padova
Youth career
- Titani
Senior career
| Years | Team | Apps | (Points) |
| 2018−2019 | F.I.R. Academy | | |
| 2019 | →Zebre | 2 | (0) |
| 2019−2022 | Mogliano | 17 | (0) |
| 2019−2022 | →Benetton | 19 | (5) |
| 2022−2024 | Benetton | 15 | (0) |
| 2024 | Béziers | 2 | (0) |
| 2024– | Petrarca Padova | | |
- Correct as of 23 Sep 2022
International career
| Years | Team | Apps | (Points) |
| 2019−2020 | Italy Under 20 | 11 | (0) |
| 2021− | Italy A | 4 | (0) |
| 2022− | Italy | 1 | (0) |
- Correct as of 29 Jul 2023

Filippo Alongi (born 27 April 2000) is an Italian rugby union player. His usual position is as a Prop and he currently plays for Petrarca Padova in Serie A Elite.

Selected for F.I.R. Academy squad, in 2018–19 Pro14 season, Alongi was named like Additional Player for Zebre. Under contract with Mogliano in Top10, from 2019 to 2022, he was also named as Permit Player for Benetton. In spring 2024 he signed for Béziers in Pro D2 as Joker Medical, untile the end of the season.

In 2019 and 2020, Alongi was named in the Italy Under 20 squad. On 14 October 2021, he was selected by Alessandro Troncon to be part of an Italy A 28-man squad for the 2021 end-of-year rugby union internationals and on 8 December he was named in Emerging Italy 27-man squad also for the 2021 end-of-year rugby union internationals. On 14 March 2022, he was selected by Kieran Crowley to be part of an Italy squad for the 2022 Six Nations Championship. He made his debut against Wales.
