= Paul Derbyshire =

Italy international rugby union player

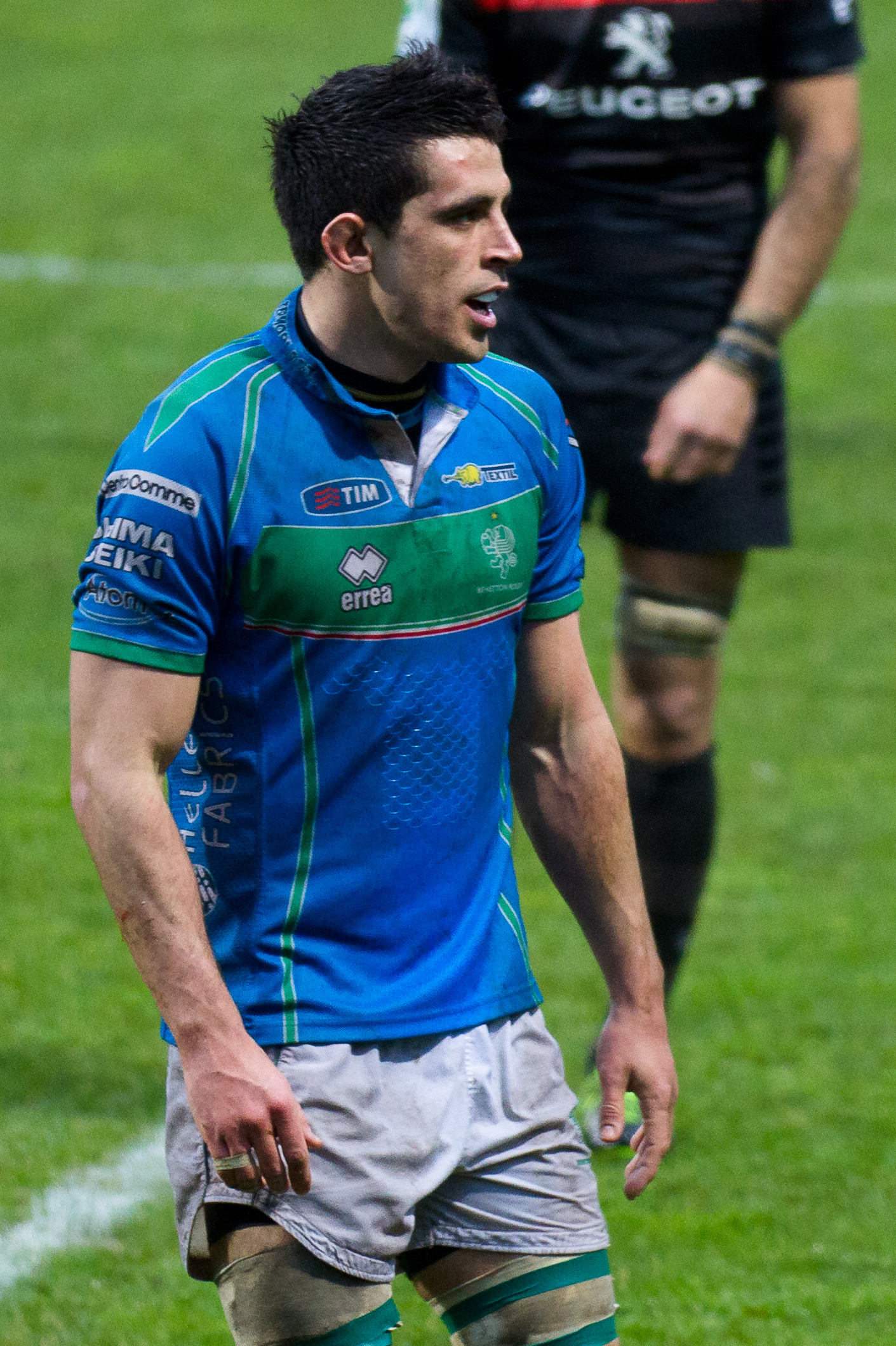
- Derbyshire in 2013
- Born: Paul Derbyshire; 3 November 1986 (age 40) Cecina, Livorno, Italy
- Height: 1.92 m (6 ft 3 1/2 in)
- Weight: 100 kg (220 lb)

Rugby union career
- Position: Flanker
- Current team: Mogliano
Senior career
Years	Team	Apps	(Points)
2004–2005	Cavalieri	13	(15)
2005–2006	Stade Français	3	(0)
2006–2008	Gran Parma	38	(0)
2008–2010	Petrarca	40	(5)
2010–2015	Benetton Treviso	58	(5)
2015−2016	Zebre	7	(5)
2016−2020	San Donà	65	(70)
2020−2023	Mogliano	44	(10)
- Correct as of 8 June 2014
International career
Years	Team	Apps	(Points)
2006	Italy Under 20	2	(10)
2009–2014	Italy	24	(0)
- Correct as of 8 June 2014

Paul Derbyshire (born 3 November 1986) is an Italian rugby union player. Derbyshire, who is a flanker, plays club rugby for Mogliano in Top12.

Derbyshire joined Benetton Treviso from Petrarca in June 2010 for their first season in the Celtic League. He played with Treviso until 2015. In 2015–16 Pro12 season, he played for Zebre.

He made his debut for Italy against Australia on 13 June 2009.
