= Nicola Belardo =

Italian rugby union player

Nicola Junior Belardo
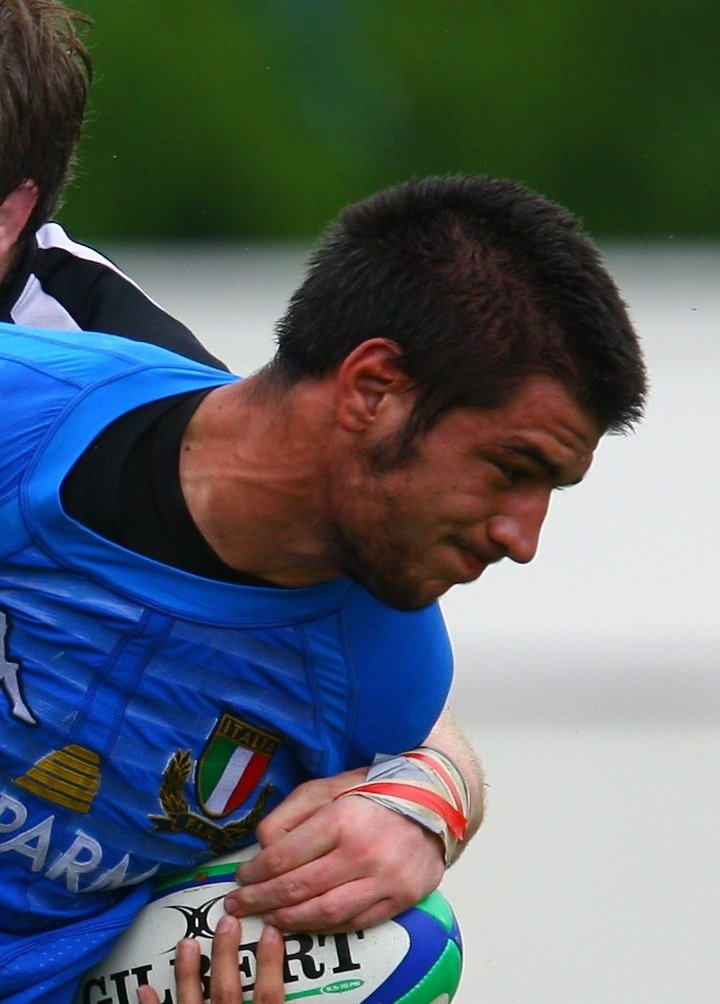
- Born: 14 September 1990 (age 36) Naples, Italy
- Height: 1.93 m (6 ft 4 in)
- Weight: 94 kg (207 lb)

Rugby union career
- Position: Flanker
Amateur team(s)
| Years | Team | Apps | (Points) |
| 2000-2008 | Partenope | | |
Senior career
| Years | Team | Apps | (Points) |
| 2008-2010 | Partenope | | |
| 2010-2012 | Cavalieri | 36 | (25) |
| 2012-2013 | Zebre | 14 | (0) |
| 2013- | Calvisano | 17 | (15) |
- Correct as of 31

Nicola Junior Belardo (born 14 September 1990) is an Italian rugby union player who plays as a flanker. He currently plays for Rugby Calvisano in the Top12.
