= Giulio Toniolatti =

Italy international rugby union player

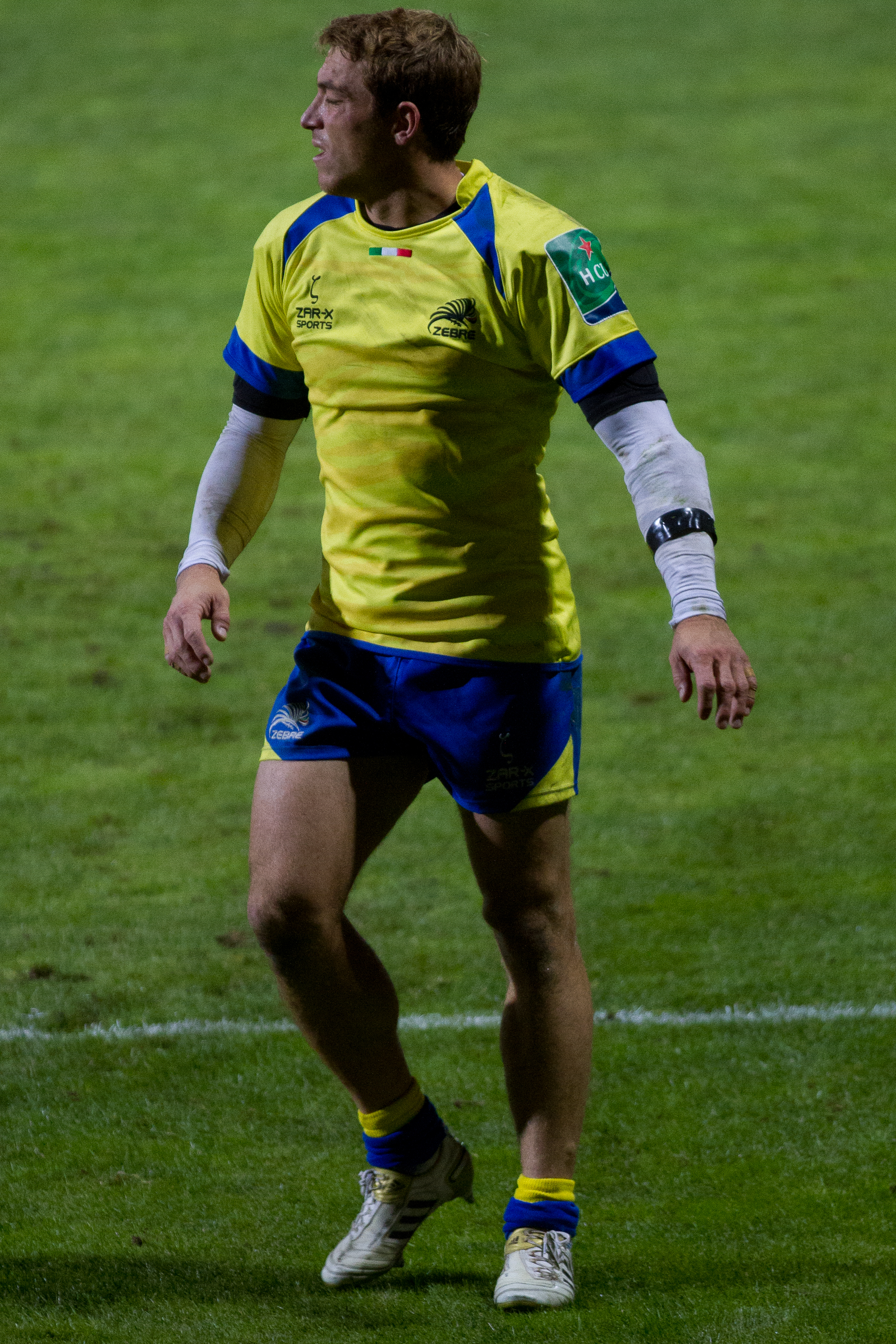
- Giulio Toniolatti during the Heineken Cup 2013-14 ‒ 11 October 2013,
- Born: 15 January 1984 (age 42) Rome, Italy
- Height: 1.83 m (6 ft 0 in)
- Weight: 85 kg (187 lb)

Rugby union career
- Position: Wing
Senior career
Years	Team	Apps	(Points)
2003-2009	UR Capitolina	44	(40)
2009-2010	Rugby Roma	20	(5)
2010-2012	Aironi	33	(10)
2012-2013	Treviso	11	(5)
2013-2016	Zebre	47	(25)
2016-2017	Lazio	16	(37)
- Correct as of 28 March 2015
International career
Years	Team	Apps	(Points)
2010−2011	Emerging Italy	6	(5)
2008–2015	Italy	15	(10)
2015	Italy Sevens	16	(22)
- Correct as of 25 November 2014

Giulio Toniolatti (Italian pronunciation: [ˈdʒuːljo tonjoˈlatti]; born 15 January 1984) is an Italian rugby union footballer who plays as a winger.

A native of Rome, Toniolatti made his debut for Italy in 2008 against Australia and was part of the Italian squad at the 2011 Rugby World Cup.

In May 2013, it was announced that Giulio Toniolatti was moving from Benetton Treviso to Zebre.
