= 2008–09 Super 10 season =

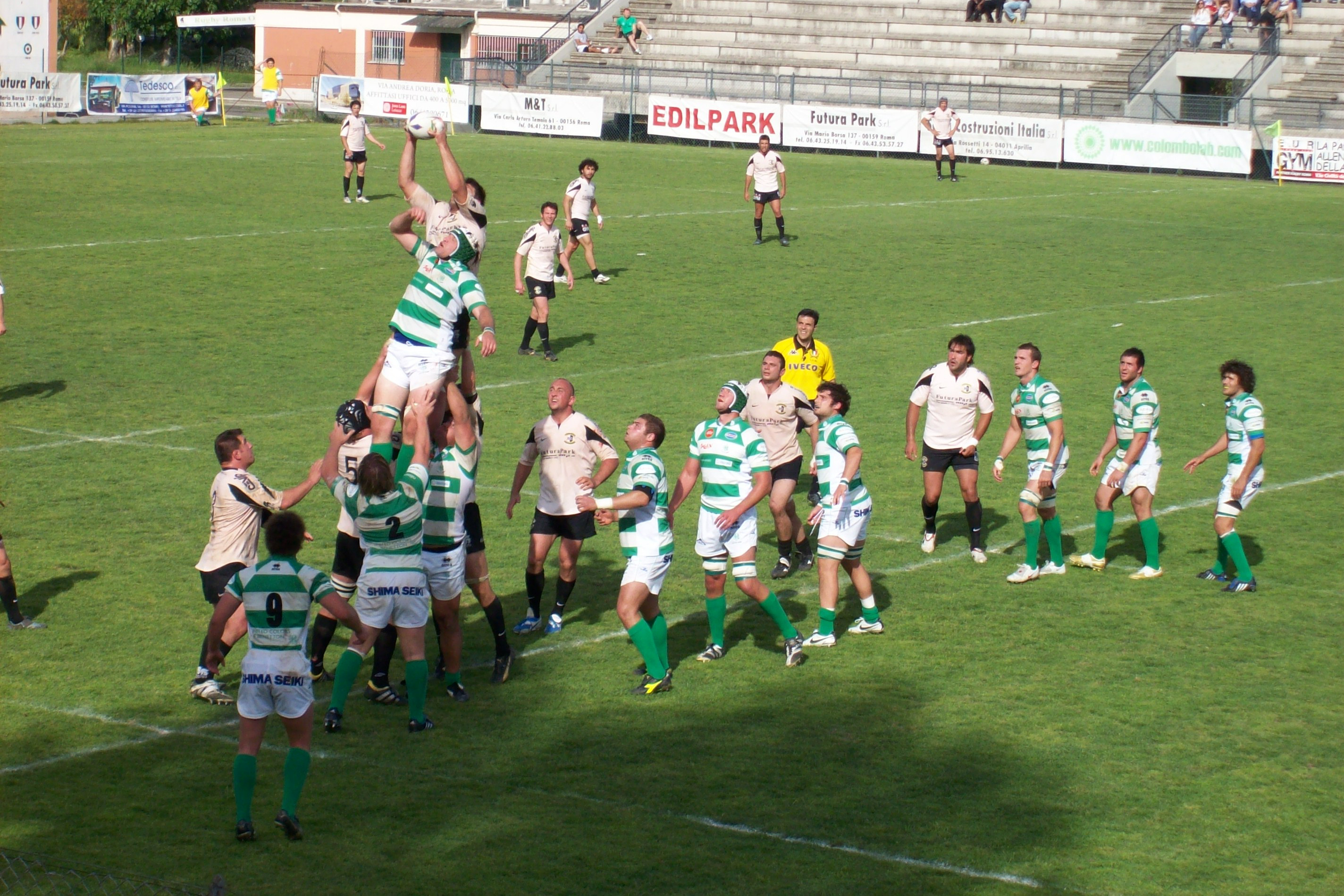
2008–09 Super 10 season

The 2008-09 Super 10 was the top level Italian domestic rugby union club competition. It ran from September through to May, operated by the Federazione Italiana Rugby. The Super 10 is now called Top12.

The Super 10 utilised the same bonus points system as almost all other major rugby union competitions (France uses a slightly different system):

- 4 points for a win.
- 2 points for a draw.
- 1 "bonus" point for scoring at least 4 tries.
- 1 "bonus" point for losing by 7 points (or less).

== Table ==
Key to colors
League champions; receive a place in the 2009-10 Heineken Cup.
The top remaining participant in the four team playoffs also receive a place in the 2009-10 Heineken Cup. The third highest placed team then competes against a team from the Celtic League for a place in the Heineken Cup. (The Magners League team is determined as the best placed team who haven't already qualified for the Heineken Cup via other means. Currently this is limited to the higher of the lowest placed Welsh and lowest placed Irish team. This is because 2 Scottish teams earn direct qualification and currently only 2 Scottish teams are fielded.)
Bottom team is relegated to Serie A.

2008-09 Super 10 Table
	Club	Played	Won	Drawn	Lost	Points for	Points against	Bonus points	Points
1	Viadana	18	13	0	5	492	336	9	61
2	Benetton Treviso	18	12	2	4	426	292	7	59
3	Calvisano	18	12	0	6	447	297	6	54
4	Parma	18	11	1	6	415	326	6	52
5	Rovigo	18	11	1	6	389	318	6	52
6	Padova	18	9	1	8	343	402	4	42
7	Roma	18	5	0	13	333	371	8	28
8	Veneziamestre	18	4	3	11	279	408	5	27
9	Capitolina	18	4	2	12	309	475	6	26
10	Gran Parma Rugby	18	4	0	14	253	461	6	22

== Final Stages ==
The first semi-final was held on 23 May. Viadana came out on top, beating Rovigo 15–11. The next day Benetton Treviso beat Overmach Parma 15–6. The final of the Super 10 was contested on 30 May between Benetton Treviso and Arix Viadana at the Stadio Flaminio. Treviso started excellently scoring three tries in the first half. Treviso's first try was scored by Andy Vilk, a terrific run from the 10 metre line. Argentine Pedro Di Santo was the next to be driven over the line from a few metres out, and the third by the fly-half Marius Goosen who caught the ball from a 22 dropout and ran straight through Viadana to score a try that should never have been one. Viadana responded with a try by Sam Cox. Viadana's full-back Garry Law missed three penalties leaving the score at 19–10 to Treviso at the halfway point. In the second half Law went from villain to hero. He scored a try and a second penalty to take Viadana into the lead by one point. However Law's opposite kicker Marius Goosen was one of the heroes for Treviso. He goaled a penalty to snatch back the lead and then converted replacement Robert Barbieri's try to take Treviso to their 14th title. The final score was Treviso 29-20 Viadana.

Scorers:

For Benetton Treviso: Tries: Vilk, Di Santo, Goosen, Barbieri Cons: Goosen 3 Pen: Goosen

Arix Viadana: Tries: Cox, Law Cons: Law 2 Pens: Law 2
