= Alberto Benettin =

Italian rugby union player

- Full name: Alberto Benettin
- Born: 25 November 1990 (age 35) Padova, Italy
- Height: 1.83 m (6 ft 0 in)
- Weight: 87 kg (13 st 10 lb; 192 lb)

Rugby union career
- Position: Fly-half
- Current team: Zebre
Senior career
Years	Team	Apps	(Points)
2010–12	Aironi	13	(0)
2012–13	Zebre	15	(0)
2013–14	Valsugana Padova		
2014–19	Petrarca	56	(54)
2017	→Treviso	1	(0)
2019−	Biella		
- Correct as of 24 June 2013
International career
Years	Team	Apps	(Points)
2009–10	Italy U20	13	(0)
2012	Italy	1	(0)
2013	Emerging Italy	2	(0)
- Correct as of 24 June 2013

Alberto Benettin (born Padova, 25 November 1990) is an Italian rugby union player. He plays as a fly-half. He currently plays for Zebre in the Pro14.

Benettin made his debut for Italian national rugby union team against Canada on 15 June 2012.
