= Carl Manu =

Samoa international rugby union player

- Full name: Carl Sone Manu
- Born: 3 April 1983 (age 43) Christchurch, New Zealand
- Height: 5 ft 8 in (173 cm)
- Weight: 213 lb (97 kg)
- School: Cashmere High School

Rugby union career
- Position: Centre
Senior career
Years	Team	Apps	(Points)
2006–07	Parma		
2007–10	Colorno		
2010–13	S.S. Lazio		
International career
Years	Team	Apps	(Points)
2002	Samoa	4	(0)

Carl Sone Manu (born 3 April 1983) is a Samoan former rugby union international.

== Rugby career ==
A native of Christchurch, Manu attended Cashmere High School and played his rugby mainly as a centre.

Manu made four capped appearances for Samoa as a 19-year-old in 2002, featuring in three 2003 Rugby World Cup qualifiers, as Samoa secured a place in the tournament, then played a Test against the Springboks in Pretoria.

From 2006 to 2013, Manu played his rugby in Italy, with Parma, Colorno and S.S. Lazio.

Manu won back to back Anderson Medals in 2017 and 2018, for the best and fairest player in Newcastle and Hunter Rugby Union's first-grade competition. He captained the Hunter Wildfires in Sydney's Shute Shield.

== See also ==
- List of Samoa national rugby union players
