= Benetton Rugby =

Italian rugby union team, based in Treviso

(Italy) Benetton Rugby
- Full name: Benetton Rugby
- Union: Federazione Italiana Rugby
- Nickname: Leoni (Lions)
- Founded: 1932; 94 years ago
- Location: Treviso, Italy
- Ground: Stadio Comunale di Monigo (Capacity: 5,000)
- President: Antonio Pavanello
- Coach: Wayne Pivac
- Captain(s): Sebastian Negri; Michele Lamaro
- League: United Rugby Championship
- 2025–26: 13th (Scottish/Italian Shield: 3rd)
1st kit	2nd kit

Official website
- www.benettonrugby.it
- Current season

Benetton Rugby, also known as Benetton Treviso, is an Italian professional rugby union team based in Treviso, Veneto which competes in the United Rugby Championship, the European Rugby Challenge Cup and European Champions Cup. Treviso rugby team was founded in 1932 and has won 15 Italian national championships. The team has been owned by the Benetton clothing company since 1979. Treviso have competed in the United Rugby Championship (formerly the Pro14 and Pro12) since 2010, and have previously competed in the Italian domestic championship.

Treviso have supplied many players to the Italian national team, such as Alessandro Zanni and Leonardo Ghiraldini. Conversely, several notable foreign internationals have played for Treviso, including Rugby World Cup winners Craig Green, John Kirwan and Michael Lynagh.

The club's president is Antonio Pavanello, elected in December 2025.

The club has also a women's section established in 1982, known as Red Panthers, which has won 16 national championships.

== History ==
=== Amateur era: 1932–1995 ===
Treviso rugby team was founded in 1932. The club won its first honour when it took the 1956 Italian premiership. Benetton Treviso won its first Italian Cup in 1970 and in 1978 won the Italian premiership again. The year after Benetton became the main sponsor, the team's name became "Benetton Rugby Treviso". Treviso won the domestic premiership in 1983, then again in 1989 and in the 1992 season.

=== Professional era: 1995–present ===
Benetton Treviso Rugby turned professional after 1995. They dominated the Italian league from 1997 until 2010, winning the championship 10 times (1997, 1998, 1999, 2001, 2003, 2004, 2006, 2007, 2009 and 2010) during those 14 seasons and twice finishing second. They also won the Italian Cup in 1998.

Benetton Treviso has competed in the Heineken Cup competition almost every year since the competition began in 1995 along with the professional era. Benetton Treviso competed in the inaugural 1995–96 Heineken Cup, winning one game and losing one. The following season they played four matches, winning one game. In the 1998–99 Heineken Cup, they won three games. Benetton Treviso spent the 2000–01 and 2002–03 seasons in the European Challenge Cup, but have appeared in the Heineken Cup in each season since then. They won half of their games during the 2004–05 Heineken Cup, but won only one match in the following four seasons (at Newport Gwent Dragons in 2007). In the 2009–10 Heineken Cup opener, they defeated reigning French Top 14 champions Perpignan 9–8 in Treviso.

Following the 2009–10 season, Treviso left the Italian domestic competition and in 2010–11 was one of two Italian teams to join the Celtic League to play against clubs from Ireland, Wales and Scotland. The new league was to be known as the Pro12. Both Italian teams were guaranteed places annually into the Heineken Cup, which had previously been awarded to the two top teams in the domestic Italian National Championship of Excellence. An agreement had been reached in early March 2010 to allow two Italian teams a place in the Celtic League. In 2010, it was proposed that Aironi and a new team, Praetorians Roma, would join, but Treviso were nominated instead. Treviso and a combination of Duchi Nord-Ovest rugby clubs could not agree to form one regional representative club and lost out in the first round of bidding. However, Pretorians Roma failed to satisfy financial criteria, and Treviso instead joined the Pro12.

Treviso finished their first two season in the Pro12 (2010–11 and 2011–12) in 10th place, while in the 2012–13 season they finished 7th with 50 points. In the next three seasons, Treviso performed poorly, ending 11th, 11th and 12th out of twelve teams. After that, a new head coach was engaged for the 2016/2017 season, the New Zealander Kieran Crowley. The former All Black formed a new coaching team with two ex-Italian internationals, Marco Bortolami and Fabio Ongaro. Treviso finished the season in 10th place.

In 2017/2018, the championship was joined by two South Africans teams, becoming the Pro14, and was divided into two conferences. This season Treviso nearly reached the European Rugby Champions Cup play-offs, ending 5th in the conference with 55 points. For first time since Treviso joined this league the club has been able to record more wins than losses (11 against 10).

Ahead of the 2017/18 season, Benetton Rugby Treviso was renamed Benetton Rugby. In the 2022/23 season it founded a U23 academy and a regional U19 academy.

== Honours ==
- Italian Championship:
  - Champions: 15 (1956, 1978, 1983, 1989, 1992, 1997, 1998, 1999, 2001, 2003, 2004, 2006, 2007, 2009, 2010)
- Coppa Italia:
  - Champions: 4 (1970, 1998, 2005, 2010)
- Italian Super Cup:
  - Champions: 2 (2006, 2009)
- Pro14 Rainbow Cup
  - Champions: (2021)
- United Rugby Championship Scottish/Italian Shield
  - Runner Up: (2022-23), (2023-24)

== Current standings ==
Pos	Team	Pld	W	D	L	PF	PA	PD	TF	TA	TB	LB	Pts	Qualification
1	Glasgow Warriors	18	13	0	5	479	338	+141	72	48	11	2	65	Qualification for the Champions Cup and knockout stage
2	Leinster (CH)	18	12	0	6	515	370	+145	77	51	13	2	63	Qualification for the Champions Cup and knockout stage
3	Stormers	18	12	1	5	504	344	+160	63	48	9	1	60	Qualification for the Champions Cup and knockout stage
4	Bulls (RU)	18	12	0	6	576	406	+170	82	59	10	1	59	Qualification for the Champions Cup and knockout stage
5	Munster	18	11	0	7	396	376	+20	59	51	8	3	55	Qualification for the Champions Cup and knockout stage
6	Cardiff	18	11	0	7	353	372	−19	52	52	7	4	55	Qualification for the Champions Cup and knockout stage
7	Lions	18	10	1	7	532	473	+59	73	70	9	3	54	Qualification for the Champions Cup and knockout stage
8	Connacht	18	10	0	8	442	395	+47	62	56	10	4	54	Qualification for the Champions Cup and knockout stage
9	Ulster	18	9	1	8	494	420	+74	72	60	10	4	52	Qualification for the Challenge Cup
10	Sharks	18	8	1	9	467	428	+39	71	57	9	3	46	Qualification for the Challenge Cup
11	Ospreys	18	7	2	9	376	454	−78	55	69	4	3	39	Qualification for the Challenge Cup
12	Edinburgh	18	7	0	11	362	439	−77	57	66	6	4	38	Qualification for the Challenge Cup
13	Benetton	18	6	2	10	327	493	−166	41	71	4	1	33	Qualification for the Challenge Cup
14	Scarlets	18	4	2	12	361	460	−99	52	63	3	5	28	Qualification for the Challenge Cup
15	Dragons	18	3	4	11	350	481	−131	46	71	4	4	28	Qualification for the Challenge Cup
16	Zebre	18	2	0	16	312	587	−275	43	85	3	4	15	Qualification for the Challenge Cup

Updated to match(es) played on 16 May 2026. Source: UnitedRugby.com
Rules for classification: Tiebreakers for teams tied on points: 1) Number of matches won 2) The difference between points for and points against 3) The number of tries scored 4) The most points scored 5) The difference between tries for and tries against 6) The fewest red cards received 7) The fewest yellow cards received.

== Season records ==
=== Celtic League / Pro12 ===
Benetton Treviso joined the Celtic League for the 2010–11 season.

Season	Played	Won	Drawn	Lost	Bonus	Points	Pos
2010–11	22	9	0	13	2	38	10th
2011–12	22	7	0	15	8	36	10th
2012–13	22	10	2	10	6	50	7th
2013–14	22	5	1	16	8	30	11th
2014–15	22	3	1	18	5	19	11th
2015–16	22	3	0	19	8	20	12th
2016–17	22	5	0	17	3	23	10th

=== Pro14 ===
Season	Conference	Played	Won	Drawn	Lost	Bonus	Points	Pos
2017–18	Conference B	21	11	0	10	11	55	5th
2018–19	Conference B	21	11	2	8	9	57	3rd
2018–19	Quarter-finals	Munster 15 – 13 Benetton Rugby						
2019–20	Conference B	15	6	1	8	10	36	5th
2020–21	Conference B	16	0	1	15	7	7	6th

=== Pro14 Rainbow Cup ===
Season	Played	Won	Drawn	Lost	Bonus	Points	Pos
2021	5	4	1	0	2	22	1st
2021	Final	Benetton Rugby 35 – 8 Bulls					

=== United Rugby Championship ===
Season	Played	Won	Drawn	Lost	Bonus	Points	Pos
2021-22	18	6	1	11	9	35	13th
2022-23	18	8	0	10	9	41	11th
2023-24	18	11	1	6	8	50	7th
2023-24	Quarter-finals	Bulls 30 – 23 Benetton Rugby					
2024-25	18	9	1	8	8	46	10th

=== Heineken Cup / European Rugby Champions Cup ===
Season	Pool/Round	Played	Won	Drawn	Lost	Bonus	Points	Pos
1995–96	Pool 1	2	1	0	1	0	2	2nd
1996–97	Pool 1	4	1	0	3	0	2	4th
1997–98	Pool 5	6	2	0	4	0	4	3rd
1998–99	Pool 4	6	3	0	3	0	6	3rd
1999–00	Pool 5	6	2	0	4	0	4	3rd
2001–02	Pool 2	6	1	0	5	0	2	4th
2003–04	Pool 5	6	1	0	5	1	5	3rd
2004–05	Pool 2	6	3	0	3	2	14	3rd
2005–06	Pool 4	6	0	0	6	3	3	4th
2006–07	Pool 1	6	0	0	6	0	0	4th
2007–08	Pool 1	6	1	0	5	1	5	4th
2008–09	Pool 3	6	0	0	6	0	0	4th
2009–10	Pool 1	6	1	0	5	1	5	4th
2010–11	Pool 5	6	0	0	6	1	1	4th
2011–12	Pool 5	6	1	1	4	1	7	4th
2012–13	Pool 2	6	1	0	5	1	5	4th
2013–14	Pool 5	6	0	0	6	0	0	4th
2014–15	Pool 5	6	1	0	5	0	4	4th
2015–16	Pool 4	6	0	0	6	0	0	4th
2017–18	Pool 5	6	0	0	6	4	4	4th
2019–20	Pool 1	6	1	0	5	2	6	4th
2024–25	Pool 2	4	2	0	2	3	11	3rd
2024–25	Round of 16	Castres Olympique 39 – 37 Benetton Rugby						

=== European Rugby Challenge Cup ===
Season	Pool/Round	Played	Won	Drawn	Lost	Bonus	Points	Pos
2000–01	Pool 1	6	5	0	1	0	10	2nd
2002–03	2nd round	Newcastle Falcons 43 – 32 Benetton Rugby (aggregate score)						
2016–17	Pool 1	6	2	0	4	0	8	3rd
2018–19	Pool 5	6	4	0	2	4	20	2nd
2020-21	Preliminary stage	2	1	0	1	1	5	7th
2020-21	Round of 16	Benetton Rugby 29 – 16 Agen						
2020-21	Quarter-finals	Montpellier Hérault Rugby 31 – 25 Benetton Rugby						
2021–22	Pool B	4	2	0	2	0	8	3rd
2021–22	Round of 16	Toulon Rugby 36 – 17 Benetton Rugby						
2022–23	Pool B	4	3	0	1	3	15	2nd
2022–23	Round of 16	Benetton Rugby 41 - 19 Connacht						
2022–23	Quarter-finals	Benetton Rugby 27 - 23 Cardiff Rugby						
2022–23	Semi-finals	Toulon Rugby 23 – 0 Benetton Rugby						
2023–24	Pool 2	4	3	0	0	3	15	1st
2023–24	Round of 16	Benetton Rugby 27 - 17 Lions						
2023–24	Quarter-finals	Benetton Rugby 39 - 24 Connacht						
2023–24	Semi-finals	Gloucester Rugby 40 – 23 Benetton Rugby						
2025–26	Pool 2	4	4	0	0	3	19	1st
2025–26	Round of 16	Benetton Rugby 38 - 35 Cardiff Rugby						
2025–26	Quarter-finals	Benetton Rugby 41 - 44 Exeter Chiefs						

== Stadium ==
The team play at the Stadio Comunale di Monigo in Treviso, 4 km northwest of the city centre. The stadium has two covered stands and a capacity of 5,000.

== Staff and coaching team ==
The staff for the 2026–27 season is:

- Sports director – Antonio Pavanello
- Head coach – Wayne Pivac
- Assistant coach – Salvatore Costanzo
- Assistant coach – Pete Wilkins
- Assistant coach – Dewald Senekal
- Assistant coach - Rhys Patchell
- Team Manager – Enrico Ceccato
- Head of Recruitment – Andrea Marcato
- Kit Man – Federico Zani
- Head of Strength & Conditioning – Tommaso Boldrini
- Trainer – Alessandro Zanni − Riccardo Ton – Luca Morisi – William Lavis
- Fitness Data Analyst – Alberto Botter − Marco Maniera

== Current squad ==
2026–27 Benetton squad
**Props**: (Italy) Destiny Aminu; (Italy) **Simone Ferrari**; (Italy) Marcos Gallorini; (Argentina) Gonzalo Hughes; (Argentina) Matias Medrano; (Italy) **Ivan Nemer**; (Italy) **Tiziano Pasquali**; (Italy) **Mirco Spagnolo**; (Italy) **Giosuè Zilocchi**; **Hookers**: (Argentina) **Bautista Bernasconi**; (Italy) Nicholas Gasperini; (Tonga) **Siua Maile**; **Locks**: (Italy) **Niccolò Cannone**; (Italy) **Riccardo Favretto**; (Italy) **Federico Ruzza**; (New Zealand) Isaia Walker-Leawere	**Back row**: (Italy) **Lorenzo Cannone**; (Italy) **Alessandro Izekor**; (New Zealand) Jadin Kingi *; (Italy) **Michele Lamaro** **(cc)**; (Italy) **Giulio Marini**; (Italy) **Sebastian Negri** **(cc)**; (Italy) **Manuel Zuliani**; **Scrum-halves**: (Italy) **Alessandro Garbisi**; (England) Andy Uren; (Australia) Louis Werchon; **Fly-halves**: (South Africa) Jean Smith*; (Samoa) **Jacob Umaga**	**Centres**: (Australia) **Josh Flook**; (Italy) **Leonardo Marin**; (Argentina) Tomás Medina; (Italy) François Carlo Mey; (Italy) Federico Zanandrea; **Wings**: (Italy) **Louis Lynagh**; (Italy) **Paolo Odogwu**; (Argentina) **Ignacio Mendy**; (Fiji) Onisi Ratave; **Fullbacks**: (Italy) **Matt Gallagher**; (Italy) **Lorenzo Pani**; (South Africa) Rhyno Smith
(cc) denotes co-captain. **Bold** denotes internationally capped players. * denotes players qualified to play for Italy on residency or dual nationality. Taking into account signings and departures ahead of 2026–27 season as listed on List of 2026–27 United Rugby Championship transfers. Source:

=== Additional players ===
2026–27 Benetton additional players
**Props**: (Italy) Dario Argenton (Note: Additional player from CUS Padova.); **Hookers**: (Italy) Cristian D’Apollonia (Note: Additional player from Calvisano.); (Italy) Valerio Pelli (Note: Additional player from Mogliano.); **Locks**: (Italy) Simone Fardin (Note: Additional player from Rugby Casale.); (Italy) Mattia Midena (Note: Additional player from Mogliano.)	**Back row**: (Italy) Nelson Casartelli (Note: Additional player from Mogliano.); (Italy) Piero Gritti * (Note: Additional player from Rangers Vicenza); (Italy) Antony Miranda (Note: Additional player from Mogliano.); (South Africa) Gershom Pieters * (Note: Additional player from Benetton academy.); **Scrum-halves**: (Italy) Mattia Andretti (Note: Additional player from Mogliano); (Australia) Cristiano Tizzano * (Note: Additional player from Mogliano.); **Fly-halves**: (Italy) Francesco Braga (Note: Additional player from Rugby Valpolicella.); (Italy) Marco Bragagnolo (Note: Additional player from Benetton academy); (Italy) Federico Forti (Note: Additional player from Valsugana Rugby); (South Africa) Stehan Heymans * (Note: Additional player from Rangers Vicenza)	**Centres**: (Italy) Filippo Drago (Note: Additional player from Mogliano.); (Italy) Giacomo Falchetto (Note: Additional player from Benetton academy.); **Wings**: (Italy) Giovanni Marzotto (Note: Additional player from Benetton academy.); **Fullbacks**: (Italy) Alessandro Drago (Note: Additional player from Mogliano.); (Italy) David Luisato (Note: Additional player from Mogliano.)
**(c)** denotes the team captain. **Bold** denotes internationally capped players. * denotes players qualified to play for Italy on residency or dual nationality. Taking into account signings and departures ahead of 2025–26 season as listed on List of 2025–26 United Rugby Championship transfers. Source:

== Selected former players ==
=== Italian players ===
Former players who have played for Benetton and have caps for Italy

- Manfredi Albanese
- Tommaso Allan
- Filippo Alongi
- Orazio Arancio
- Enrico Bacchin
- Robert Barbieri
- Marco Barbini
- Mattia Bellini
- Alberto Benettin
- Tommaso Benvenuti
- Mauro Bergamasco
- Valerio Bernabò
- Stefano Bettarello
- Callum Braley
- Luca Bigi
- Lucio Boccaletto
- Tobias Botes
- Ignacio Brex
- Giorgio Bronzini
- Dean Budd
- Kris Burton
- Michele Campagnaro
- Gonzalo Canale
- Carlo Checchinato
- Lorenzo Cittadini
- Oscar Collodo
- Walter Cristofoletto
- Mauro Dal Sie
- Denis Dallan
- Manuel Dallan
- Giacomo Da Re
- Santiago Dellapè
- Benjamin de Jager
- Andrea De Marchi
- Paul Derbyshire
- Alberto Di Bernardo
- Raffaele Dolfato
- Piermassimiliano Dotto
- Angelo Esposito
- Hame Faiva
- Gianluca Faliva
- Simone Favaro
- Ignacio Fernandez Rouyet
- Ivan Francescato
- Marco Fuser
- Ezio Galon
- Paolo Garbisi
- Gonzalo García
- Julian Gardner
- Ornel Gega
- Leonardo Ghiraldini
- Mark Giacheri
- Edoardo Gori
- Giovanni Grespan
- Andrea Gritti
- Toa Halafihi
- Jayden Hayward
- Tommaso Iannone
- Edoardo Iachizzi
- Monty Ioane
- Marco Lazzaroni
- Alberto Lucchese
- Gianmarco Lucchesi
- Andrea Marcato
- Ramiro Martínez
- Francesco Mazzariol
- Nicola Mazzucato
- Tommaso Menoncello
- Luke McLean
- Ian McKinley
- Matteo Minozzi
- Francesco Minto
- Jean-François Montauriol
- Luca Morisi
- Alessandro Moscardi
- Giacomo Nicotera
- Ludovico Nitoglia
- David Odiete
- Fabio Ongaro
- Edoardo Padovani
- Scott Palmer
- Sergio Parisse
- Antonio Pavanello
- Enrico Pavanello
- Mario Pavin
- Massimiliano Perziano
- Giovanni Pettinelli
- Simon Picone
- Giancarlo Pivetta
- Walter Pozzebon
- Andrea Pratichetti
- Franco Properzi
- Nicola Quaglio
- Iliesa Ratuva Tavuyara
- Marco Riccioni
- Michele Rizzo
- Guido Rossi
- Leonardo Sarto
- Stefano Saviozzi
- Franco Sbaraglini
- Diego Scaglia
- Fabio Semenzato
- Michele Sepe
- Alberto Sgarbi
- Andrea Sgorlon
- Luca Sperandio
- Braam Steyn
- Tito Tebaldi
- Giulio Toniolatti
- Cherif Traorè
- Moreno Trevisiol
- Alessandro Troncon
- Giorgio Troncon
- Corniel van Zyl
- Tommaso Visentin
- Manoa Vosawai
- Federico Zani
- Alessandro Zanni
- Gianni Zanon
- Marco Zanon
- Matteo Zanusso
- Sergio Zorzi

=== Overseas players ===
Former players who have played for Benetton and have caps for their Representative Team

- (Argentina) Tomás Albornoz
- (Argentina) Lautaro Bazán
- (Argentina) Lucas Borges
- (Argentina) Agustín Creevy
- (Argentina) Thomas Gallo
- (Argentina) Nicolás Roger
- (Argentina) Tomás Vallejos
- (Australia) Michael Lynagh
- (Australia) Brendan Williams
- (England) Michael Horak
- (England) Tom Palmer
- (England) Marcus Watson
- (Fiji) Henry Seniloli
- (Fiji) Michael Tagicakibau
- (Ireland) Ian Keatley
- (Ireland) Simon Mason (rugby union)
- (Japan) Christian Loamanu
- (New Zealand) Craig Green
- (New Zealand) John Kirwan
- (New Zealand) (Tonga) Malakai Fekitoa
- (South Africa) Andries Coetzee
- (South Africa) Dewaldt Duvenage
- (South Africa) Franco Smith
- (South Africa) Bian Vermaak
- (South Africa) Marco Wentzel
- (Samoa) Filo Paulo
- (Samoa) Henry Stowers
- (Scotland) Stewart Campbell
- (Scotland) Sam Hidalgo-Clyne
- (Tonga) Nasi Manu
- (Wales) Andy Moore

== I Dogi ==
Treviso is an executive member of the historical territorial representative of I Dogi (the Doges) that have recovered in 2015 and represents several clubs in Veneto and Friuli-Venezia Giulia. Currently no provision is made for a selection Seniors who take the field with the shirt of The Doges: to represent its brand and colors are at this stage the representative under-14, under-16 male and female under-18 male and female managed by Veneto Regional Committee. May occur during the right conditions, there is still the desire to be able to field, even if it is currently not a priority.

In the past, Dogi was a historical invitational team that included the best players of Triveneto, area of Italy in which this sport is very widespread. The team was founded on 17 December 1973 in Treviso, and played its last game on 17 November 1993. In twenty years they played 22 games with teams of international level, collecting 15 victories. The selection shirt was red, with golden edges.

== Benetton Women ==
Since November 2023, the Franchise has also had a women's team, which plays official tests with Spanish team.

== See also ==
- Pro14
- Heineken Cup
- European Challenge Cup
- Top12
- Coppa Italia
