= S.S. Lazio Rugby 1927 =

Italian rugby union team

(Italy) S.S. Lazio Rugby 1927
- Full name: Polisportiva S.S. Lazio Rugby 1927
- Union: Italian Rugby Federation
- Founded: 1927; 98 years ago
- Location: Rome, Italy
- Ground(s): Giulio Onesti Olimpic Preparation Center (Capacity: 1,300)
- President: Alfredo Biagini
- Coach(es): Daniele Montella
- Captain(s): Carlo Filippucci
- League(s): Top12
- 2017–18: 9th
1st kit	2nd kit

Official website
- www.laziorugby.it

Polisportiva S.S. Lazio Rugby 1927, also called S.S. Lazio, is an Italian rugby union club based in Rome. The club is the rugby union branch of the multisport club SS Lazio, which most famous section is the association football team.

S.S. Lazio play in Serie A Elite and in the 2024-25 season represents Rome along with Fiamme Oro Rugby in the top tier of the Italian league system.

They were the first XV in Italy established in Rome in 1927, as “S.S. Lazio Rugby”, the rugby section of Lazio Sports Association. The founders were the brothers Vinci: Eugenio (Vinci I), Paolo (Vinci II), Francesco (Vinci III) and Pietro (Vinci IV). The Oval eagles debuted on 13 May 1928 at Rome's National Stadium (demolished and rebuilt in the 1950s as Stadio Flaminio) in front of 20,000 spectators. S.S. Lazio Rugby defeated “XV Legione Leonessa d'Italia” by a score of 17-0.

They play their home games at the Giulio Onesti Olimpic Preparation Center of Acqua Acetosa, in the Parioli district.

== Honours ==
- Italian championship
  - Runners-up (1): 1928–29
- Excellence Trophy
  - Runners-up (2): 2011–12, 2012–13

== Current squad ==
The S.S. Lazio squad for 2024–25:

Lazio Top10 squad
**Props**: (Italy) Valerio Cordì; (Italy) Damiano D'Aleo; (Italy) Lorenzo Gaddi; (Italy) Achraf Hliwa; (Brazil) Leonel Moreno*; (Italy) Gabriele Moscioni; (Italy) Lorenzo Pesucci; (Argentina) Fabio Massimo Ruffini; **Hookers**: (Italy) Niccolò Corvasce; (Italy) Paolo Gisonni; (Argentina) Roman Pretz*; **Locks**: (Argentina) Federico Ehgartner; (Italy) Gabriele Cicchinelli; (Argentina) Felipe Juan Bruno Schmidt*; (Argentina) Imanol Urraza*; (Italy) Matteo Tommasini	**Back row**: (Italy) Lorenzo Cannata; (Italy) Matteo Morelli; (Italy) Nicolò Pilati; (Argentina) Rodrigo Perez Boulan*; (Italy) Matteo Urbani; (Italy) Cesare Zucconi; **Scrum-halves**: (Italy) **Manfredi Albanese**; (Italy) Nicolò Cristofaro; (Italy) Emanuele Leo; (Argentina) Homero Picone*; **Fly-halves**: (Argentina) Felipe Barla*; (Italy) Matteo Bianco; (Italy) Francesco Cozzi	**Centres**: (Italy) Gabriele Baffigi; (Italy) GMichele Bianco; (Italy) Tommaso Cruciani; (Italy) Federico Gianni; (England) William Shankland; **Wings**: (Italy) Francesco Bonavolontà; (Italy) Massimo Cioffi; (Argentina) Leopoldo Herrera*; (Italy) Leonardo Sodo; (Italy) Vittorio Santarelli; (Italy) Alessio Mattoccia; (Italy) Andrea Pancini; (Italy) Andrea Vella; **Fullbacks**: (Italy) Samuel Stelitano*; (Italy) Riccardo Giovannini
(c) denotes the team captain, **Bold** denotes internationally capped players.^{*} denotes players qualified to play for Italy on residency or dual nationality. Players and their allocated positions from the Lazio website.

== Selected former players ==
=== Italian players ===
Former players who have played for S.S. Lazio and have caps for Italy:

- (Italy) Bruno Ancillotti
- (Italy) Valerio Bernabò
- (Italy) Stefano Barba
- (Italy) Giuseppe Bigi
- (Italy) Giulio Bisegni
- (Italy) Pietro Ceccarelli
- (Italy) Gerardo Cinti
- (Italy) Guglielmo Colussi
- (Italy) Oliviero Fabiani
- (Italy) Tommaso Fattori
- (Italy) Alessandro Fusco
- (Italy) Andrea Lo Cicero
- (Italy) Gilberto Luchini
- (Italy) Ivo Mazzucchelli
- (Italy) Ludovico Nitoglia
- (Italy) Michele Sepe
- (Italy) Franco Paganelli
- (Italy) Sami Panico
- (Italy) Carlo Pratichetti
- (Italy) Giulio Rubini
- (Italy) Francisco Rubio
- (Italy) Giulio Toniolatti
- (Italy) Eugenio Vinci (Vinci I)
- (Italy) Francesco Vinci (Vinci III)
- (Italy) Pietro Vinci (Vinci IV)
- (Italy) Paolo Vinci (Vinci II)

=== Overseas players ===
Former players who have played for S.S. Lazio and have caps for their respective country:

- (Argentina) Rodrigo Bruno
- (Australia) John Cootes
- (Australia) Gary Pearse
- (England) Dick Greenwood
- (New Zealand) Zinzan Brooke
- (Samoa) – (New Zealand) Stephen Bachop
- (Samoa) Carl Manu
- (United States) Nick Civetta
