= Rugby Lyons Piacenza =

Italian rugby union club, based in Piacenza

(Italy) Lyons
- Full name: Rugby Lyons Piacenza
- Union: Federazione Italiana Rugby
- Founded: 1963; 63 years ago
- Location: Piacenza, Italy
- Ground: Stadio Comunale Beltrametti (Capacity: 3,000)
- President: (Italy) Guido Pattarini
- Coach: (Italy) Gonzalo Garcia
- Captain: (Italy) Lorenzo Maria Bruno
- League: Serie A Elite
1st kit	2nd kit

Official website
- www.rugbylyons.it

Rugby Lyons Piacenza is an Italian rugby union club currently competing in Top12. It is based in Piacenza in Emilia Romagna.

== Current squad ==
Lyons Piacenza squad for 2025–26 season:

Lyons Piacenza squad (Note: Additional player under contract with URC team Zebre Parma)
**Props**: (Argentina) Romulo Acosta*; (Argentina) Angelo Carones*; (Italy) Andrea Libero; (Argentina) Francisco Minervino*; (Argentina) Luciano Torres*; **Hookers**: (Italy) Alessio Cocchiaro; (Italy) Marcello Maggiore; **Locks**: (Argentina) Lucas Bur; (Italy) Lorenzo Cemicetti; (Italy) Santiago Ruiz; (Italy) Jacopo Salvetti	**Back row**: (Burkina Faso) **Abdoul Nourou Bance**; (Italy) Diego Beletti; (Italy) Luca Bellucci; (Italy) Alberto Bottacci; (Senegal) **Khadim Cissè**; (Italy) Alessandro Moretto; (Italy) Alessandro Perazzoli; (Argentina) Santiago Portillo; **Scrum-halves**: (Italy) Anlessio Dabalà; (Italy) Alessandro Via; **Fly-halves**: (Argentina) Gaspar Russo*; (South Africa) Ruben Liebenberg; (South Africa) Dunkan Steenkamp	**Centres**: (South Africa) De Klerck Juhanrè; (Italy) Matteo Gaetano; (Italy) Pietro Rodina; (Argentina) Ansaldo Santiago Castro; **Wings**: (Italy) Federico Cuminetti; (Italy) Nikola Nakov; **Fullbacks**: (Italy) Tiziano Pasini; (Italy) Giovanni Via
(c) denotes the team captain, **Bold** denotes internationally capped players.^{*} denotes players qualified to play for Italy on residency or dual nationality. Players and their allocated positions from the Lyons website.

== Chronicle ==
Chronicle of the Rugby Lyons
- 1963 · 13 September, Foundation of Rugby Lyons
- 1963/64 · Youth Championship (Emilian round)
- 1964/65 · Youth Championship (Emilian round)
- 1965/66 · Serie C
- 1966/67 · Youth Championship (Emilian round)
- 1967/68 · Youth Championship (Emilian round)
- 1968/69 · Youth Championship (Emilian round)
- 1969/70 · Youth Championship (Emilian round)
- 1970/71 · Youth Championship (Emilian round)
- 1971/72 · Youth Championship (Emilian round)
- 1972/73 · Serie D
  (promotion in serie C)
- 1973/74 · Serie C
- 1974/75 · Serie C
- 1975/76 · Serie C
- 1976/77 · Serie C
  (promotion in serie B)
- 1977/78 · Serie B
- 1978/79 · Serie B
- 1979/80 · Serie B
- 1980/81 · Serie B
- 1981/82 · Serie B
  (promotion in serie A)
- 1982/83 · Serie A
- 1983/84 · Serie A
- 1984/85 · Serie A
- 1985/86 · Serie A
  (demotion in serie A2)
- 1986/87 · Serie A2
  (promotion in serie A1)
- 1987/88 · Serie A1
- 1988/89 · Serie A1
  (demotion in serie A2)
- 1989/90 · Serie A2
- 1990/91 · Serie A2
  (promotion in serie A1)
- 1991/92 · Serie A1
- 1992/93 · Serie A1
  (demotion in serie A2)
- 1993/94 · Serie A2
- 1994/95 · Serie A2
  (demotion in serie B)
- 1995/96 · Serie B
  (promotion in serie A2)
- 1996/97 · Serie A2
  (demotion in serie B)
- 1997/98 · Serie B
- 1998/99 · Serie B
- 1999/2000 · Serie B
- 2000/01 · Serie B
- 2001/02 · Serie B
- 2002/03 · Serie B
  (promotion in serie A)
- 2003/04 · Serie A
- 2004/05 · Serie A
- 2005/06 · Serie A
- 2006/07 · Serie A
- 2007/08 · Serie A2
- 2008/09 · Serie A2
- 2009/10 · Serie A2
- 2010/11 · Serie A2
  (promotion in serie A1)
- 2011/12 · Serie A1
- 2012/13 · Serie A1
- 2013/14 · Serie A1
