= Coppa Italia (rugby union) =

Italian rugby union competition

The Coppa Italia (Italian Cup), from 2011 to 2018 Excellence Trophy, is a rugby union competition in Italy for domestic clubs. The competition is second to the Top10, the Italian national championship. The competition has been contested annually since 1967, though it was not held from 1974 to 1980, and 1983 to 1994, and again in 1996, 1999 and 2002. The first club to win the competition was CUS Roma.

From 2011 to 2020, it involves only teams from the Top10 who don't participate to the European Rugby Challenge Cup Qualifying Competition, now Continental Shield.

From 2023−2024 season, the competition was substituted with a development tournament named Serie A Elite Cup with emerging players under contract with Serie A Elite teams. The first edition was won by Mogliano Rugby.

== Past winners ==
- 1967 CUS Roma
- 1968 Fiamme Oro Padova
- 1969 Fiamme Oro Padova
- 1970 Treviso
- 1971 Fiamme Oro Padova
- 1972 Fiamme Oro Padova
- 1973 L'Aquila
- 1974–1980 Not held
- 1981 L'Aquila
- 1982 Petrarca Padova
- 1983–1994 Not held
- 1995 Milan
- 1996 Not held
- 1998 Benetton Treviso
- 1999 Rugby Roma Olimpic
- 2000 Viadana
- 2001 Petrarca Padova
- 2002 Not held
- 2003 Viadana
- 2004 Calvisano
- 2005 Benetton Treviso
- 2006 Parma
- 2007 Viadana
- 2008 Parma
- 2009 Parma
- 2010 Benetton Treviso
- 2011 Rugby Roma Olimpic
- 2012 Calvisano
- 2013 Viadana
- 2014 Fiamme Oro
- 2015 Calvisano
- 2016 Viadana
- 2017 Viadana
- 2018 San Donà
- 2019 Valorugby Emilia
- 2020 Rovigo Delta
- 2021 Not assigned
- 2022 Petrarca Padova
- 2023 Petrarca Padova
- 2024 Not held
- 2025 Rovigo Delta
- 2026 Valorugby Emilia

== Performance by club ==
Club	Winners	Winning years
Viadana	6	2000, 2003, 2007, 2013, 2016, 2017
Fiamme Oro	5	1968, 1969, 1971, 1972, 2014
Benetton Treviso	4	1970, 1998, 2005, 2010
Petrarca	4	1982, 2001, 2022, 2023
Calvisano	3	2004, 2012, 2015
Parma	3	2006, 2008, 2009
Rugby Roma Olimpic	2	1999, 2011
L'Aquila	2	1973, 1981
Rovigo Delta	2	2020, 2025
Valorugby Emilia	2	2019, 2026
San Donà	1	2018
Milan	1	1995
CUS Roma	1	1967

== Italian Super Cup ==
From 2006 to 2009 it was instituted an annual Super Cup contested between the Italian Championship winner and Coppa Italia winner. In 2025 was recreated as annual competition at the beginning of the season.

=== Performance by club ===
Edition	Winner
2006	Benetton
2007	Viadana
2008	Rugby Parma
2009	Benetton
2010 – 2024	Not held
2025	Rovigo Delta

== See also ==
- Rugby union in Italy
- Top12
