= L'Aquila Rugby =

Former Italian rugby union club, based in L'Aquila

(Italy) L'Aquila Rugby
- Full name: L’Aquila Rugby 1936 S.S.D. A.R.L.
- Union: Federazione Italiana Rugby
- Founded: 1936
- Disbanded: 2018
- Location: L'Aquila, Italy
- Ground: Stadio Tommaso Fattori (Capacity: 10,000)
- President: Mauro Zaffiri
- Coach: Massimo Di Marco
- League: Top12
- 2014–15: 9th (Excellence)
1st kit	2nd kit

Official website
- laquilarugbyclub.it

L'Aquila Rugby 1936 was an Italian rugby union club based in L'Aquila, the capital of Abruzzo. The official colours of the club were black and green, the colours of the city of L'Aquila. The club went into liquidation and disbanded in 2018.

== History ==
The roots of L'Aquila Rugby date back to the 1930s when, between 1936 and 1942, L'Aquila took part in tournaments organized by the Comandi Federali della GIL. It reached its peak in the 1937–38 season when, after Tommaso Fattori, a legendary figure for the history of the club (the stadium of L'Aquila, Stadio Tommaso Fattori is named after him), joined the team, the club won the local tournament qualifying for the final one, where it finished the season fourth out of 54 participants. It first played in a championship in 1948.

In 1949–50 L'Aquila participated in the Serie B and were in contention for promotion to Serie A up to the final game of the season, Genoa eventually winning out. The following year the team won promotion to the Serie A then the highest division in Italy. In 1958–59 they were losing finalists in the Serie A Grand Final. In 1963–64 they were relegated to Serie B, but returned to Serie A the following year. They won their first title in 1967 defeating Fiamme Oro Padova 6 to 0. Two years later they won their second title after having won 18 games out of 22 without losing a match.

The 1970s weren't a good decade for the Aquilani, as they won only one Italian Cup in 1973. In the 1980s they won two more titles in 1981 (league and cup double) and 1982. These were the years of Massimo Mascioletti (54 caps with the Italian national team), Serafino Ghizzoni (60 caps) and Luigi Troiani (47 caps). Then another period of not brilliant results followed, before they could celebrate their fifth title in 1993–94 after having defeated Milan 23–14 in the historical final in Padua. In 1999–2000 L'Aquila Rugby played another final for the Italian title, losing 35–17 against Roma in the match played in the Flaminio stadium.

In 2001–02 L'Aquila were part of the newly formed Super 10 (now Top12).

In 2009–10 L'Aquila were promoted back to the National Championship of Excellence, finishing 8th in this season.

== Honours ==
- National Championship of Excellence:
  - Champions: 1967, 1969, 1981, 1982, 1994
- Coppa Italia:
  - Champions: 1973, 1981
- Reserves Championship:
  - Champions: 1967, 1970, 1973, 1975, 1985
- Under 19/20:
  - Champions: 1950, 1960, 1965, 1966, 1979, 1981, 1995, 1997
- Under 17/18:
  - Champions: 1977
- Coppa Primavera Under 17:
  - Champions: 1967
- Under 15/16:
  - Champions: 1977

== Notable players ==
- Carlo Festuccia (Italy)
- Andrea Lo Cicero (Italy)
- Andrea Masi (Italy)
- Gert Peens (Italy)
- Luigi Troiani (Italy)
- Maurizio Zaffiri (Italy)
- Simon Picone (Italy)
- Rob Louw (South Africa)
- Joel Stransky (South Africa)
- Mike Brewer (New Zealand)
- Frano Botica (New Zealand)
- Loki Crichton (Samoa)

== Statistics ==
=== European Challenge Cup ===
Season	Played	Won	Drawn	Lost	For	Against
2001–02	6	2	0	4	107	239
2002–03	2	0	0	2	19	133
2003–04	2	0	0	2	11	125
2004–05	2	0	0	2	48	109
2005–06	6	0	0	6	103	358

== See also ==
- List of rugby union clubs in Italy
- Rugby union in Italy
