= Rugby Club I Cavalieri Prato =

Italian rugby union team

(Italy) I Cavalieri Prato
- Full name: Rugby Club I Cavalieri Prato
- Union: Federazione Italiana Rugby
- Founded: 2000; 26 years ago
- Location: Prato, Italy
- Region: Tuscany
- Ground: Stadio Enrico Chersoni (Capacity: 2.500)
- President: Fabrizio Tonfoni
- Coach: Alejandro Moreno
- Captain: Luca Petillo
- League: Top12
- 2013–14: 5th (Excellence)
1st kit	2nd kit

Official website
- www.icavalieri.it

Rugby Club I Cavalieri is a rugby union team from the city of Prato, Italy. They play in the Top12 having finished 2nd in the 2012–13 edition, losing to Mogliano Rugby in the final.

== History ==
The team was formed in 2000 through the merger of three existing rugby clubs: I Sorci Verdi (the first rugby team in Prato, founded in 1958), S.S. Rugby Prato and Rugby Iolo.

During the 2005–06 season, they qualified for the Serie A play-offs for the first time. Hoping for promotion to the Super 10, they won the first leg of their semi-final before losing the home leg and going out by aggregate score.

In the following season, they won both legs of the semi-final before losing the final 13–10 to Venezia. In the 2008–09 Serie A tournament they were promoted to the 2009–10 version of the Super 10, after beating L'Aquila in the promotion playoff 25–18.

In their first season Cavalieri ended the regular season at the fifth place of Super 10 2009–10 and achieved the right to take part in the European Challenge Cup.

Cavalieri were drawn in Pool 1 Amlin Challenge Cup 2010–11 with Harlequins (ENG), Connacht (IRL) and Bayonne (FRA). The Cavalieri won their European debut against Connacht on 9 October 2010 by 23 – 21.

In June 2010 Cavalieri Prato merged with other ten Tuscan rugby clubs to form "Cavalieri Toscana Rugby Eccellenza", a new rugby franchise with the aim to represent the professional élite rugby of region Tuscany. The team reached the play-off final of both 2011–12 and 2012–13 Eccellenza tournaments, losing the final against Cammi Calvisano and Mogliano Rugby, respectively.

Due to economic and corporate problems, the troubled 2014-15 season ended with the last place in the standings and the subsequent relegation to Serie A. Florence 1931, also relegated from series A to series B, acquired the title sportsman and could therefore maintain the superior category. Subsequently the president of the club, Fabrizio Tonfoni decided, together with the top management of Florence, to proceed with a merger between the clubs, with the aim of creating a more competitive team in the Serie A championship. The newly formed team took the name of Rugby Club I Medicei, based in Florence in the same sports facility as the now former Florence Rugby 1931.

== Notable former players ==
- (Argentina) Patricio Fuselli
- (Italy) Nicola Belardo
- (Italy) Kris Burton
- (Italy) Alberto Chiesa
- (Italy) Paul Derbyshire
- (Italy) Andrea De Rossi
- (Italy) Edoardo Gori
- (Italy) Marko Stanojevic
- (Italy) Rima Wakarua
- (New Zealand) Billy Ngawini

== Results ==
- 2000–01 2nd place serie B
- 2001–02 1st place serie B (promoted to serie A)
- 2002–03 3rd place serie A
- 2003–04 3rd place serie A
- 2004–05 5th place serie A
- 2005–06 2nd place serie A (lost to Futura Park Roma at playoff semifinal)
- 2006–07 2nd place serie A (lost to Venezia at playoff final)
- 2007–08 2nd place serie A1 (lost to L'Aquila at playoff semifinal)
- 2008–09 1st place serie A1 (payoff winner to L'Aquila and serie A Italian Champion, promoted to Super 10)
- 2009–10 5th place Super 10 (Amlin Challenge Cup qualifier)
- 2010–11 2nd place Excellence (lost to Petrarca at playoff semifinal)
- 2011–12 2nd place Excellence (lost to Calvisano at playoff final)
- 2012–13 3rd place Excellence (lost to Mogliano at playoff final)
- 2013–14 5th place Excellence
