= Petrarca Rugby =

Italian rugby union club, based in Padua

(Italy) Petrarca Rugby
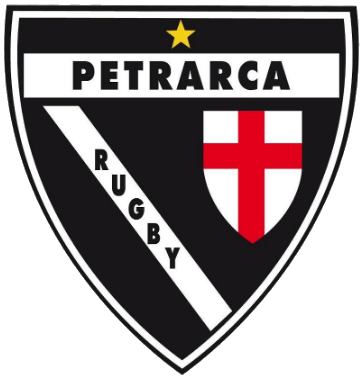
- Full name: Petrarca Rugby S.r.l.
- Union: Italian Rugby Federation
- Founded: 1947; 79 years ago
- Location: Padua, Italy
- Ground: Stadio centro memo geremia (Capacity: 9,000)
- President: Enrico Toffano
- Coach: Víctor Jiménez
- Captain: Andrea Trotta
- League: Serie A Élite
1st kit	2nd kit

Official website
- www.petrarcarugby.it

Petrarca Rugby is a professional rugby union club from Padua, Italy, currently competing in the top tier of the Italian rugby union, the Serie A Elite.

Founded in 1947, the team is the rugby union branch of the Unione Sportiva Petrarca, an omnisport club that includes also basketball, futsal, volleyball, fencing and football.

They have won 15 league titles, 11 of them between 1969–70 and 1986–87 seasons; their most recent successes in the Italian championship came 24 years after their latest feat, at the end of the 2010–11 season, and in recent years appearing in four straight finals 3 against rugby delta Rovigo (2020-21,2021-22,2022-23)and 1 against rugby viadana (2023-24) and winning two (2021-22 and 2023-24).

Petrarca is the tied 2nd most successful side in the Italian championship with Benetton rugby (15 time champions) and behind amatori rugby Milano (18 time champions)

== Honours ==
- Italian championship
  - Champions (15): 1969–70, 1970–71, 1971–72, 1972–73, 1973–74, 1976–77, 1979–80, 1983–84, 1984–85, 1985–86, 1986–87, 2010–11, 2017–18, 2021−22, 2023−24
  - Runners-up (3): 1997–98, 1998–99,2020−21,2022-23
- Coppa Italia/Excellence Trophy
  - Champions (4): 1981–82, 2000–01, 2021−22, 2022−23
  - Runners-up (4): 1980–81, 2007–08, 2009–10, 2015–16

== Current squad ==
The squad for the Serie A Elite season is:

Petrarca Padova 2025-2026 squad
**Props**: (Italy) **Filippo Alongi**; (Argentina) Octavio Barbati*; (Italy) Valerio Bizzotto; (Italy) Sergio Pelliccioli; (Italy) Federico Pisani; (Argentina) Luciano Torres; **Hookers**: (Italy) Francesco Minervino; (Argentina) Thomas Montilla*; (Italy) Tommaso Scramoncin; **Locks**: (Argentina) Diego Sebastian Galetto*; (Italy) Filippo Marchetti; (New Zealand) Thomas Nowlan; (Italy) Federico Telandro	**Back row**: (Italy) Jacopo Botturi; (Italy) Nardo Casolari; (Italy) Enrico Ghigo; (Italy) Davide Goldin; (Italy) **Toa Halafihi**; (England) Alex Minozzi*; (Italy) Luca Nostran; (Argentina) Mariano Romanini*; (Italy) Andrea Trotta; **Scrum-halves**: (Italy) **Alberto Chillon**; (Italy) Lorenzo Citton; (Italy) Mattia Jimenez; **Fly-halves**: (Italy) Samuele Destro; (Australia) Daniel Donato*; (Australia) Liam Richman	**Centres**: (Italy) Marco Broggin; (Italy) Andrea De Masi; (Argentina) Marcos De Sanctis*; (Italy) Riccardo Ioannucci; (Italy) Dewi Passarella; (Italy) Vittorio Trez; (Italy) Alessandro Santinello; **Wings**: (Italy) Mattia Dalla Silvestra; (Italy) Giovanni Scagnolari; (Italy) Marco Scalabrin; **Fullbacks**: (Scotland) Scott Lyle; (Italy) **Matteo Minozzi**; (Italy) Gianmarco Pietramala
(c) denotes the team captain, **Bold** denotes internationally capped players.^{*} denotes players qualified to play for Italy on residency or dual nationality. Players and their allocated positions from the Petrarca website.

== Selected former players ==
=== Italian players ===
Former players who have played for Petrarca and have caps for Italy:

- (Italy) Giuseppe Artuso
- (Italy) Enrico Bacchin
- (Italy) Mattia Bellini
- (Italy) Alberto Benettin
- (Italy) Mauro Bergamasco
- (Italy) Mirco Bergamasco
- (Italy) Lucio Boccaletto
- (Italy) Marco Bortolami
- (Italy) Alberto Chillon
- (Italy) Dario Chistolini
- (Italy) Oscar Collodo
- (Italy) Manuel Dallan
- (Italy) Renato de Bernardo
- (Italy) Paul Derbyshire
- (Italy) Angelo Esposito
- (Italy) Piergianni Farina
- (Italy) Roberto Favaro
- (Italy) Antonio Galeazzo
- (Italy) Mauro Gardin
- (Italy) Guglielmo Geremia
- (Italy) Leonardo Ghiraldini
- (Italy) Marzio Innocenti
- (Italy) Andrea Marcato
- (Italy) Luca Martin
- (Italy) Fulvio Lorigiola
- (Italy) Luigi Luise
- (Italy) Luciano Orquera
- (Italy) Mario Piovan
- (Italy) Pasquale Presutti
- (Italy) Michele Rizzo
- (Italy) Roberto Saetti
- (Italy) Alberto Sgarbi
- (Italy) Samuela Vunisa

=== Overseas players ===
Former players who have played for Petrarca and have caps for their respective country:

- (Australia) Mark Bartholomeusz
- (Australia) David Campese
- (Australia) David Knox
- (Australia) Brendan Williams
- (Chile) Rodrigo Fernández
- (Fiji) Sisa Koyamaibole
- (Fiji) Nicky Little
- (France) Guy Pardiès
- (Scotland) Stuart Grimes
- (South Africa) Theuns Stofberg
- (South Africa) Rudolf Straeuli
- (South Africa) Cameron Oliver
- (South Africa) Kobus Wiese
- (Tonga) James Faiva
- (Wales) Richie Collins

== Statistics ==
=== European Challenge Cup (1996–2014) ===
Season	Played	Won	Drawn	Lost	For	Against
1996-97	5	1	0	4	118	148
1997-98	6	0	2	4	108	212
2001-02	6	2	0	4	114	223
2002-03	2	0	0	2	36	81
2003-04	2	0	0	2	32	75
2004-05	2	0	0	2	42	126
2006-07	6	0	0	6	47	298
2007-08	6	1	0	5	73	190
2008-09	6	3	0	3	112	206
2009-10	6	0	0	6	95	180
2010-11	4	1	0	3	68	135

==== European Shield ====
Season	Played	Won	Drawn	Lost	For	Against
2002-03	6	3	1	2	140	118
2003-04	4	2	0	2	93	110
2004-05	4	2	0	2	93	110

=== Heineken Cup (1995–2014) ===
Season	Played	Won	Drawn	Lost	For	Against
1998-99	6	1	0	5	79	169
1999-2000	6	0	0	6	76	282
