= Serie A Elite (rugby union) =

Professional men's rugby union competition in Italy

- Current season, competition or edition: 2025–26 Serie A Élite
- Formerly: Divisione Nazionale; Serie A Serie A1; Super 10; Eccellenza; Top12; Top10
- Sport: Rugby union
- Founded: 1929; 97 years ago
- First season: 1928–29
- Owner: Federazione Italiana Rugby
- No. of teams: 10
- Country: Italy
- Most recent champion: Valorugby Emilia
- Most titles: Amatori Milano (18 titles)
- Broadcasters: Federazione Italiana Rugby (Live Streams on Facebook and Youtube)
- Sponsor: Peroni
- Relegation to: Serie A
- International cups: European Rugby Challenge Cup; European Rugby Continental Shield
- Related competitions: Coppa Italia
- Website: www.federugby.it

Serie A Elite, formerly known as the Top10 or the Peroni Top10 for sponsorship reasons, is Italy's top level professional men's rugby union competition. The Serie A Elite is run by Federazione Italiana Rugby (FIR) and is contested by 10 teams as of the 2025–2026 season.

The leading teams qualify to play against teams from the other leading rugby union nations in Europe in the European Challenge Cup. Aironi and Benetton Treviso began competing in the league now known as the United Rugby Championship in the 2010–11 season, and took both Italian places in the Heineken Cup. Owing to financial problems, the FIR revoked Aironi's professional licence after the 2011–12 season; that team was replaced in what was then known as Pro12 by the FIR-operated Zebre. From 2014 to 2015, one of the two Italian URC sides competed in the Heineken Cup's replacement, the European Rugby Champions Cup; the other played in the European Rugby Challenge Cup. Both URC teams are intended to concentrate the best domestic talent and help develop the quality of Italian players and therefore improve the talent pool for the national team.

== History ==
Names of the Italian National Rugby Championship
| Divisione Nazionale | 1928–29 until 1945–46 |
| Serie A | 1945–46 until 1959–60; 1965–66 until 1985–86 |
| Serie A1 | 1986–87 until 2000–01 |
| Super 10 | 2001–02 until 2009-10 |
| Eccellenza | 1960–61 until 1964–65; 2010–11 until 2017–18; |
| Top12 | 2018–2019 |
| Top10 | 2020–2023 |
| Serie A Elite | 2023– |

The former logo of the Eccellenza championship between 2010 and 2018.

The competition was originally named Divisione Nazionale since its origin in 1928 until the 1945–46 season where the name of the National Championship was changed to the Serie A. Upon 1959, the competition's name was changed was changed to the Eccellenza before becoming the Serie A once again 26 years after in 1985. However, shortly after the name change, in 1986 the Serie A became the Serie A1 with the second tier taking the name of the Serie A2.

Since the 1987–88 season, the championship has been played under a play-off phase format after a regular season with the title being assigned through a final (several cities to have hosted finals include Padua, Bologna and Rome). After a major restructuring in 2001, the national championship was named Super 10 leaving the Serie A1 and Serie A2 to become the second and third divisions of Italian rugby respectively. Upon the 2009–10 season, the Super 10 championship which was founded (in 2001) and operated by the L.I.R.E. (Lega Italiana Rugby d'Eccellenza) (Italian Elite Rugby Union League in Italian) had folded in 2009, the Federazione Italiana Rugby (FIR) had taken over organising the championship.

The name of championship was changed once again to the Eccellenza for the 2010–11 season. After 8 years of the Eccellenza, the competition was increased to 12 teams and was rebranded as the Top12.

Upon the year 2010, the then known Celtic League (now the Pro14) had decided to expand their competition to 12 teams and add two Italian teams, one of them being Benetton Treviso (which would mean they would stop participating in the Super 10 and another being Aironi (a newly founded team that was later replaced by Zebre in the 2012–2013 season of the Pro 12 after folding due to financial reasons and having its license revoked by the Italian Rugby Federation).

The competition's name was changed from Top 12 to Top 10 in 2020 when teams I Medicei and San Donà withdrew their participation.

For the 2023–24 season, the competition was reduced in teams from 10 to 9 (with the withdrawal of Calvisano), and returned to 10 from 2024 to 2025 with the name reverting to Serie A Elite.

== Current teams ==
Locations of teams in the 2025–26 Serie A Élite

2026–27 Serie A Elite
| Club | Established | City | Stadium | Capacity | Titles (Last) |
| Biella Rugby Club | 1977 | Biella, Piedmont | Cittadella del Rugby | 1,000 | |
| Fiamme Oro | 1955 | Rome, Lazio | Centro Sportivo Polizia di Stato | 1,300 | 5 (1968) |
| Lyons Piacenza | 1963 | Piacenza, Emilia-Romagna | Stadio Comunale Beltrametti | 3,000 | |
| Mogliano | 1956 | Mogliano, Veneto | Stadio Maurizio Quaggia | 786 | 1 (2013) |
| Rugby Parabiago | 1948 | Parabiago, Lombardy | CSC Venegoni-Marazzini | 600 | |
| Petrarca | 1947 | Padua, Veneto | Stadio Plebiscito | 7,715 | 13 (2018) |
| Rovigo Delta | 1935 | Rovigo, Veneto | Stadio Mario Battaglini | 5,500 | 12 (2016) |
| Rugby Vicenza 2025 | 1974 | Vicenza, Veneto | Rugby Arena | 800 | |
| Valorugby Emilia | 1970 | Reggio nell'Emilia, Emilia-Romagna | Stadio Mirabello | 4,500 | 1 (2026) |
| Viadana | 1970 | Viadana, Lombardy | Stadio Luigi Zaffanella | 6,000 | 1 (2002) |

Amatori Milano hold the record for the most titles won with eighteen titles (the first one in 1929, the most recent in 1996) before being disbanded in 2011; Benetton Treviso follow with fifteen (first in 1956 as Rugby Treviso); Petrarca (rugby union club from Padua that won their first title in 1970) with thirteen and Rovigo (first title in 1951) who won twelve titles. Apart from the aforementioned teams no one has won more than five titles. The team that wins the Italian championship wears the Scudetto on their jerseys the following season, The clubs that hold at least ten titles win the right to wear a golden star on their jerseys.

== Celtic League participation ==
Despite rising playing standards and more media attention on rugby union, Italian teams competing in the Heineken Cup and European Challenge Cup have generally struggled to compete against the established club teams of the other Six Nations countries. In response both John Kirwan, the former Italian head coach, and David Pickering, the Welsh Rugby Union chairman, suggested that merged Italian teams should enter the Celtic League, now known as Pro14, and in March 2009 the Celtic Rugby Board and FIR announced an agreement in principle to add two Italian teams to the Magners League for 2010–11. The two teams were intended to offer Italian qualified players a higher standard of rugby to hone their skills. It removed the best Italian players from the top-tier league, and it was envisaged that the Super 10 would be a semi-professional league.

On 18 July 2009 it was announced that the two Magners League teams would be the newly formed Aironi, based in Viadana, and "Praetorians Roma", from the capital. As of October 2009, there was a change and it was announced the two teams will be Aironi and Benetton Treviso. Praetorians Roma were nominated in the first round but failed to meet the criteria set down by the evaluators and Benetton Treviso took their place. These new sides also played in the Heinken Cup and Italy retained its four places in the Challenge Cup, which were taken by top Super 10 teams, become Eccellenza, orphan of Benetton Treviso and Viadana.

After the 2011–12 season, the first for the league under the Pro12 name, the FIR revoked the licence of Aironi due to financial problems. That team was replaced in Pro12 by a new FIR operated side, Zebre.

Beginning in the 2014–15 season, the Heineken Cup and European Challenge Cup will be replaced by a new three-tiered European competition structure: the Heineken Cup will be replaced by the European Rugby Champions Cup, the European Challenge Cup will be replaced by the European Rugby Challenge Cup, and a new third-tier Qualifying Competition will be added. The highest-placed Italian Pro12 side automatically qualifies for the Champions Cup, the other Pro12 side will compete in the new Challenge Cup unless it qualifies for the Champions Cup by being one of the three highest-placed teams apart from the top team of each Pro12 country (Italy, Ireland, Scotland, Wales). Select sides from the Excellence will play in the Qualifying Competition, to be held before the main season. Along with club sides from second-tier European rugby nations, the Eccellenza sides will compete for two places in the new European Rugby Challenge Cup with 4 teams. From the 2016–17 season the third-tier is named European Rugby Continental Shield.

== Format ==
Currently the Italian senior leagues are structured in the following way:

- Serie A Elite made up of 10 teams; the first four go into the playoff stage and the winner is the "Champion of Italy"; the last two classified are relegated to the Serie A.
- Serie A: is the second level of Italian rugby union, divided in 3 same-rank territorial pools of 10 teams each, who play each other home and away. There are 4 relegations to Serie B, scheduled for the 3 teams that end the season in 10th place in their own pool and one of the three teams ranked 9th after a mini-playout. Promotion to Serie A Elite works similarly: the three teams that win their own pool automatically qualify for the finals, reached by one of the second teams after a mini-round of playoff. The finals, played home and away, are used to determine the two teams promoted to Serie A Elite.
- Serie B: divided in 4 same-rank territorial pools of 12 teams each, who play each other home and away. A playoff stage determines the 4 teams promoted to Serie A and a playout stage the 8 teams relegated in Serie C.
- Serie C: is the very 4th tier of Italian rugby union, divided into regional divisions. A playoffs stage determines the 8 teams that are promoted to Serie B.

== Past winners ==
- 1929 Ambrosiana
- 1930 Amatori Milano
- 1931 Amatori Milano
- 1932 Amatori Milano
- 1933 Amatori Milano
- 1934 Amatori Milano
- 1935 Rugby Roma
- 1936 Amatori Milano
- 1937 Rugby Roma
- 1938 Amatori Milano
- 1939 Amatori Milano
- 1940 Amatori Milano
- 1941 Amatori Milano
- 1942 Amatori Milano
- 1943 Amatori Milano
- 1946 Amatori Milano
- 1947 Ginnastica Torino
- 1948 Rugby Roma Olimpic
- 1949 Rugby Roma Olimpic
- 1950 Parma
- 1951 Rovigo
- 1952 Rovigo
- 1953 Rovigo
- 1954 Rovigo
- 1955 Parma
- 1956 Treviso
- 1957 Parma
- 1958 Fiamme Oro Padova
- 1959 Fiamme Oro Padova
- 1960 Fiamme Oro Padova
- 1961 Fiamme Oro Padova
- 1962 Rovigo
- 1963 Rovigo
- 1964 Rovigo
- 1965 Partenope
- 1966 Partenope
- 1967 L'Aquila
- 1968 Fiamme Oro Padova
- 1969 L'Aquila
- 1970 Petrarca
- 1971 Petrarca
- 1972 Petrarca
- 1973 Petrarca
- 1974 Petrarca
- 1975 Brescia
- 1976 Rovigo
- 1977 Petrarca
- 1978 Treviso
- 1979 Rovigo
- 1980 Petrarca
- 1981 L'Aquila
- 1982 L'Aquila
- 1983 Benetton Treviso
- 1984 Petrarca
- 1985 Petrarca
- 1986 Petrarca
- 1987 Petrarca
- 1988 Rovigo
- 1989 Benetton Treviso
- 1990 Rovigo
- 1991 Amatori Milano
- 1992 Benetton Treviso
- 1993 Amatori Milano
- 1994 L'Aquila
- 1995 Amatori Milano
- 1996 Amatori Milano
- 1997 Benetton Treviso
- 1998 Benetton Treviso
- 1999 Benetton Treviso
- 2000 Rugby Roma Olimpic
- 2001 Benetton Treviso
- 2002 Viadana
- 2003 Benetton Treviso
- 2004 Benetton Treviso
- 2005 Calvisano
- 2006 Benetton Treviso
- 2007 Benetton Treviso
- 2008 Calvisano
- 2009 Benetton Treviso
- 2010 Benetton Treviso
- 2011 Petrarca
- 2012 Calvisano
- 2013 Mogliano
- 2014 Calvisano
- 2015 Calvisano
- 2016 Rovigo Delta
- 2017 Calvisano
- 2018 Petrarca
- 2019 Calvisano
- 2020 Not assigned
- 2021 Rovigo Delta
- 2022 Petrarca
- 2023 Rovigo
- 2024 Petrarca
- 2025 Rovigo
- 2026 Valorugby Emilia

== Finals ==
| Season | Champion | Score | Runner-up |
|---|---|---|---|
| 2001–02 | Arix Viadana | 19–12 | Ghial Calvisano |
| 2002–03 | Benetton Treviso | 34–12 | Ghial Calvisano |
| 2003–04 | Benetton Treviso | 22–10 | Ghial Calvisano |
| 2004–05 | Ghial Calvisano | 25–20 | Benetton Treviso |
| 2005–06 | Benetton Treviso | 17–12 | Ghial Calvisano |
| 2006–07 | Benetton Treviso | 28–24 (a.e.t) | Arix Viadana |
| 2007–08 | Cammi Calvisano | 20–3 | Benetton Treviso |
| 2008–09 | Benetton Treviso | 29–20 | Montepaschi Viadana |
| 2009–10 | Benetton Treviso | 16–12 | Montepaschi Viadana |
| 2010–11 | Carrera Petrarca Padova | 18–14 | Femi-CZ Rovigo Delta |
| 2011–12 | Cammi Calvisano | 43–36 | Estra I Cavalieri Prato |
| 2012–13 | Marchiol Mogliano | 16–11 | Estra I Cavalieri Prato |
| 2013–14 | Cammi Calvisano | 26–17 | Femi-CZ Vea Rovigo Delta |
| 2014–15 | Cammi Calvisano | 11–10 | Femi-CZ Rovigo Delta |
| 2015–16 | Femi-CZ Rovigo Delta | 20–13 | Calvisano |
| 2016–17 | Patarò Calvisano | 43–29 | Femi-CZ Rovigo Delta |
| 2017–18 | Petrarca | 19–11 | Patarò Calvisano |
| 2018–19 | Calvisano | 33–10 | Rovigo Delta |
| 2020–21 | Rovigo Delta | 23–20 | Petrarca |
| 2021–22 | Petrarca | 19-6 | Rovigo Delta |
| 2022–23 | Rovigo Delta | 16-9 | Petrarca |
Serie A "Elite" Maschile
| 2023-24 | Petrarca | 28-10 | Rugby Viadana |
| 2024-25 | Rovigo Delta | 27-21 | Rugby Viadana |
| 2025-26 | Valorugby Emilia | 27-5 | Petrarca |

== Performance by club ==
| Club | Winners | Winning years |
|---|---|---|
| Amatori Milano | 18 | 1929, 1930, 1931, 1932, 1933, 1934, 1936, 1938, 1939, 1940, 1941, 1942, 1943, 1946, 1991, 1993, 1995, 1996 |
| Benetton Treviso | 15 | 1956, 1978, 1983, 1989, 1992, 1997, 1998, 1999, 2001, 2003, 2004, 2006, 2007, 2009, 2010 |
| Petrarca | 15 | 1970, 1971, 1972, 1973, 1974, 1977, 1980, 1984, 1985, 1986, 1987, 2011, 2018, 2022, 2024 |
| Rovigo | 15 | 1951, 1952, 1953, 1954, 1962, 1963, 1964, 1976, 1979, 1988, 1990, 2016, 2021, 2023, 2025 |
| Calvisano | 7 | 2005, 2008, 2012, 2014, 2015, 2017, 2019 |
| Fiamme Oro | 5 | 1958, 1959, 1960, 1961, 1968 |
| L'Aquila | 5 | 1967, 1969, 1981, 1982, 1994 |
| Rugby Roma Olimpic | 5 | 1935, 1937, 1948, 1949, 2000 |
| Parma | 3 | 1950, 1955, 1957 |
| Partenope | 2 | 1965, 1966 |
| Ginnastica Torino | 1 | 1947 |
| Brescia | 1 | 1975 |
| Viadana | 1 | 2002 |
| Mogliano | 1 | 2013 |
| Valorugby Emilia | 1 | 2026 |

== See also ==
- Coppa Italia (rugby union)
- Italy national rugby union team
- Rugby union in Italy
- United Rugby Championship
- European Rugby Champions Cup
- EPCR Challenge Cup
- European Shield
- European Rugby Continental Shield
