= 2015 World Rugby Under 20 Championship =

Tournament details
- Host: Italy
- Date: 2–20 June 2015
- Teams: 12

Final positions
- Champions: New Zealand
- Runner-up: England
- Third place: South Africa
- Fourth place: France

The 2015 World Rugby Under 20 Championship was the eighth annual international rugby union competition for Under 20 national teams. The event was organised for the second time in Italy by rugby's governing body, World Rugby. Twelve nations played in the tournament, with matches hosted by Parma, Viadana, Calvisano and Cremona, host city of the final match. England went into the tournament as the two-time defending champions after they successfully defended their title in the 2014 IRB Junior World Championship (as the tournament was known through 2014). This was the first U20 Championship held after the sport's governing body changed its name from the International Rugby Board to the current World Rugby.

New Zealand won the title after a 21–16 win against England in the final.

== Venues ==
The championship was held across four locations. Parma, Viadana and Calvisano hosted pool matches, with the latter two hosting semi-finals for each bracket (teams 1–4, 5–8 and 9–12). Cremona hosted the final and two of the remaining positional play-offs, with Calvisano hosting the others.

Location	Venue	Capacity
Cremona	Stadio Giovanni Zini	20,641
Viadana	Stadio Luigi Zaffanella	6,000
Calvisano	Stadio San Michele	5,000
Parma	Stadio Sergio Lanfranchi	5,000

== Teams ==
The following teams participated in the 2015 World Rugby U20 Championship:

Pool	Team	No. of Tournaments	Position 2014	Position 2015	Notes
A	England	8	1st	2nd	Runners-up
A	France	8	6th	4th	
A	Japan	3	DNP	10th	Promoted from 2014 IRB Junior World Rugby Trophy
A	Wales	8	7th	6th	
B	Australia	8	5th	5th	
B	Italy	6	11th	11th	
B	South Africa	8	2nd	3rd	Bronze Medal Winner
B	Samoa	6	8th	12th	Relegated to 2016 World Rugby Under 20 Trophy
C	Argentina	8	9th	9th	
C	Ireland	8	4th	7th	
C	New Zealand	8	3rd	1st	Champions
C	Scotland	8	10th	8th	

== Match officials ==
The following officials oversaw the thirty matches:

- TMO Shaun Veldsman travelled to Italy for the semi-finals and the final.

Referees

- Matthew Carley (England)
- Gary Conway (Ireland)
- Will Houston (Australia)
- Shuhei Kubo (Japan)
- Lloyd Linton (Scotland)
- Brendon Pickerill (New Zealand)
- Elia Rizzo (Italy)
- Juan Sylvestre (Argentina)
- Ben Whitehouse (Wales)

Reserve or Assistant Referees

- Carlo Damasco (Italy)
- Gianluigi Rossi (Italy)
- Stefano Pennè (Italy)
- Filippo Bertelli (Italy)
- Luca Trentin (Italy)
- Stefano Roscini (Italy)
- Francesco Russo (Italy)

Television match officials

- Shaun Veldsman (South Africa)

== Pool stage ==
The playing schedule and pools were announced on 25 November 2014.

Key to colours in group tables
Teams advances to finals
Teams in the 5–8th place play-offs
Teams in the 9–12th place play-offs

All times are in Central European Summer Time (UTC+2)

Points were awarded in the Pool Stage via the standard points system:

- 4 points for a win
- 2 points for a draw
- 1 bonus scoring point for scoring 4 or more tries
- 1 bonus losing point for losing by 7 or less points
- 0 points for a loss above 7 points

If at completion of the Pool Stage two or more teams were level on points, the following tiebreakers were applied:

1. The winner of the Match in which the two tied Teams have played each other;
2. The Team which has the best difference between points scored for and points scored against in all its Pool Matches;
3. The Team which has the best difference between tries scored for and tries scored against in all its Pool Matches;
4. The Team which has scored most points in all its Pool Matches;
5. The Team which has scored most tries in all its Pool Matches; and
6. If none of the above produce a result, then it will be resolved with a toss of a coin.

Pld = matches played, W = matches won, D = draws, L = losses, PF = match points for, PA = match points against, PD = Points difference between match points for and match points against, TF = tries for, TA = tries against, BP = bonus points, Pts = pool points

=== Pool A ===
Team	Pld	W	D	L	PF	PA	PD	TF	TA	BP	Pts
France	3	3	0	0	96	35	+61	13	4	1	13
England	3	2	0	1	107	53	+54	15	5	2	10
Wales	3	1	0	2	92	52	+40	12	7	1	5
Japan	3	0	0	3	17	172	–155	2	26	0	0

2 June 2015	France	19–10	Wales	Stadio San Michele, Calvisano
16:30	Try: Bonneval 7' m Ramos 13' c Blanc 57' c Con: Ramos (2/3) 14', 58'	Stats	Try: Smith 62' c Con: Evans (1/1) 63'; Pen: Jones (1/2) 30'	Referee: Matthew Carley (England)

2 June 2015	England	59–7	Japan	Stadio San Michele, Calvisano
18:30	Try: Perkins 1' c Walker 5' c Townsend (2) 8' m, 31' m Morris (2) 13' c, 18' c Howe 38' c Skinner 42' c Witty 80' c Con: Jennings (7/9) 2', 6', 14', 19', 39', 43', 80'	Stats	Try: Penalty try 61' c Con: Noguchi (1/1) 62'	Referee: Elia Rizzo (Italy)

6 June 2015	France	47–7	Japan	Stadio Sergio Lanfranchi, Parma
16:30	Try: Bethune 3' c Delannoy 9' c Doubrere 46' m Cancoriet 61' c Chat 63' c Fouyssac (2) 67' c, 79 'c Con: Belleau (2/2) 4', 10'; Meret (4/5) 62', 64', 68', 80'	Stats	Try: Penalty try 17' c Con: Noguchi (1/1) 18'	Referee: Ben Whitehouse (Wales)

6 June 2015	England	30–16	Wales	Stadio San Michele, Calvisano
20:30	Try: Clark 9' c Packman 17' m Townsend 27' c Skinner 64' m Con: Jennings (2/3) 10', 28'; Pen: Jennings (2/2) 1', 34'	Stats	Try: Watkin 38' c Con: Evans (1/1) 39'; Pen: Evans (3/3) 31', 41', 60'	Referee: Brendon Pickerill (New Zealand)

10 June 2015	England	18–30	France	Stadio Luigi Zaffanella, Viadana
16:30	Try: Chisholm 34' m Penalty try 60' c Con: Evans (1/1) 61'; Pen: Jennings (1/1) 23'; Evans (1/1) 66'	Stats	Try: Penaud (2) 18' c, 25' c Estorge 44' c Con: Ramos (3/3) 19', 26', 45'; Pen: Ramos (2/2) 5', 70'; Drop: Meret (1/1) 77'	Referee: Gary Conway (Ireland)

10 June 2015	Wales	66–3	Japan	Stadio Luigi Zaffanella, Viadana
18:30	Try: Evans 6' c Wyn Benham (2) 10' c, 31' c Phillips 19' c Adams (2) 40' m, 77' c Beard 45' c Howells 47' m Belcher 65' c Davies 72' c Con: Evans (5/7) 6', 10', 20', 32', 46'; D. Jones (3/3) 66', 73', 79'	Stats	Pen: Noguchi (1/1) 3'	Referee: Lloyd Linton (Scotland)

=== Pool B ===
Team	Pld	W	D	L	PF	PA	PD	TF	TA	BP	Pts
South Africa	3	3	0	0	119	26	+93	16	4	3	15
Australia	3	2	0	1	78	83	–5	11	11	2	10
Samoa	3	1	0	2	60	98	–38	7	14	0	4
Italy	3	0	0	3	44	94	–50	7	12	2	2

2 June 2015	Australia	34–22	Samoa	Stadio Sergio Lanfranchi, Parma
18:30	Try: Gunn 10' m Placid (2) 27' c, 68' c Deegan 49' m Kellaway 74' c Con: Deegan (3/5) 28', 69', 75'; Pen: Deegan (1/2) 2'	Stats	Try: Winterstein 40' m Dowsing 64' c Adams 71' c Con: Falaniko (2/2) 65', 72'; Pen: Ioane (1/2) 18'	Referee: Shuhei Kubo (Japan)

2 June 2015	South Africa	33–5	Italy	Stadio San Michele, Calvisano
20:30	Try: Van der Merwe 15' c Penalty try 34' c Liebenberg 37' c Bothma 65' m Van Wyk 78' c Con: Thomson (3/3) 16', 35', 38'; De Beer (1/2) 79'	Stats	Try: Agbasse 11' m	Referee: Gary Conway (Ireland)

6 June 2015	South Africa	40–8	Samoa	Stadio Sergio Lanfranchi, Parma
18:30	Try: Du Toit 7' c Jenkins 35' m Liebenberg 46' m Zas 49' c Penalty try 80' c Con: Thomson (2/4) 8', 50'; De Beer (1/1) 80'; Pen: Thomson (3/3) 4', 22', 40'	Stats	Try: Leilua 66' m Pen: Falaniko (1/1) 29'	Referee: Elia Rizzo (Italy)

6 June 2015	Australia	31–15	Italy	Stadio Sergio Lanfranchi, Parma
20:30	Try: Wilkin 31' c Tuttle 34' c Orr 37' c Korczyk 63' c Con: Deegan (4/4) 32', 35', 38', 64'; Pen: Deegan (1/1) 26'	Stats	Try: Masato 22' m Luus 66' c Con: Minozzi (1/2) 67'; Pen: Minozzi (1/3) 4'	Referee: Juan Sylvestre (Argentina)

10 June 2015	Samoa	30–24	Italy	Stadio San Michele, Calvisano
18:30	Try: Leger 4'c Falaniko 20' c Tuiomanufili 69' c Con: Falaniko (3/3) 5', 21', 71'; Pen: Falaniko (3/3) 15', 35', 59'	Stats	Try: Giammarioli 2' c Polledri 31' m Ferraro 44' c Zanetti 51' m Con: Minozzi (2/4) 3', 45'	Referee: Will Houston (Australia)

10 June 2015	South Africa	46–13	Australia	Stadio San Michele, Calvisano
20:30	Try: Vermeulen 2' c Nché 17' c Ngcukana 43' c Thomson 54' c Jenkins 59' m Zas 68' c Con: Thomson (4/4) 4', 18', 44', 56'; De Beer (1/1) 69'; Pen: Thomson (2/2) 12', 36'	Stats	Try: Paia'aua 62' m Kellaway 78' m Pen: Deegan (1/1) 8'	Referee: Ben Whitehouse (Wales)

=== Pool C ===
Team	Pld	W	D	L	PF	PA	PD	TF	TA	BP	Pts
New Zealand	3	3	0	0	125	42	+83	16	3	2	14
Ireland	3	2	0	1	45	61	–16	2	6	0	8
Scotland	3	1	0	2	59	98	–39	6	11	1	5
Argentina	3	0	0	3	51	79	–28	3	7	2	2

2 June 2015	Ireland	18–16	Argentina	Stadio Sergio Lanfranchi, Parma
16:30	Pen: Carbery (5/6) 3', 35', 40', 46', 55'; Quinlan (1/1) 80'	Stats	Try: Portillo 42' c Con: Miotti (1/1) 43'; Pen: Miotti (1/3) 5'; Boffelli (1/1) 77'; Drop: Miotti (1/1) 29'	Referee: Lloyd Linton (Scotland)

2 June 2015	New Zealand	68–10	Scotland	Stadio Sergio Lanfranchi, Parma
20:30	Try: Bridge 18' c Li 23' c Ioane 36' c Gibson 40' c Karpik 47' c Jo. Goodhue 54' m Cridge 60' c Hunt 70' m Faiane 76' c Con: Hunt (7/9) 19', 24', 37', 42', 48', 61', 77'; Pen: Hunt (3/4) 6', 29', 68'	Stats	Try: Carmichael 15' c Con: Hutchinson (1/1) 16'; Pen: Hutchinson (1/1) 10'	Referee: Juan Sylvestre (Argentina)

6 June 2015	Ireland	24–20	Scotland	Stadio San Michele, Calvisano
16:30	Try: Dardis 11' m Oliver 30' c Con: Carbery (1/2) 31'; Pen: Carbery (3/3) 20', 42', 64'; Quinlan (1/1) 77'	Stats	Try: Carmichael 61' c Knott 80'; Con: Kinghorn (2/2) 62', 80'; Pen: Horne (2/2) 36', 45'	Referee: Will Houston (Australia)

6 June 2015	New Zealand	32–29	Argentina	Stadio San Michele, Calvisano
18:30	Try: Laulala 27' c Wainui 36' m Tahuriorangi 63' c Ioane 65' c Con: Hunt (1/2) 28'; Black (2/2) 64', 66'; Pen: Hunt (1/1) 14'; Black (1/1) 77'	Stats	Try: Paolucci (2) 69', 74'; Con: Miotti (2/2) 70', 75'; Pen: Boffelli (3/5) 10', 17', 20'; Miotti (1/1) 61'; Drop: Ferro (1/2) 34'	Referee: Shuhei Kubo (Japan)

10 June 2015	Argentina	6–29	Scotland	Stadio San Michele, Calvisano
16:30	Pen: Miotti (2/4) 21', 35'	Stats	Try: Nairn 44' c Galloway 52' m Wynne 68' m Con: Kinghorn (1/3) 45'; Pen: Kinghorn (4/4) 5', 8', 19', 41'	Referee: Brendon Pickerill (New Zealand)

10 June 2015	New Zealand	25–3	Ireland	Stadio Luigi Zaffanella, Viadana
20:30	Try: Li (2) 17' m, 43' c Gibson 47' c Con: Black (2/3) 44', 49'; Pen: Black (2/2) 29', 40'	Stats	Pen: Carbery (1/3) 15'	Referee: Matthew Carley (England)

=== Standings after pool stage ===
Overall Standings
Pool Pos	Pos	Team	Pld	W	D	L	PF	PA	PD	TF	TA	BP	Pts
B1	1	South Africa	3	3	0	0	119	26	+93	16	4	3	15
C1	2	New Zealand	3	3	0	0	125	42	+83	16	3	2	14
A1	3	France	3	3	0	0	96	35	+61	13	4	1	13
A2	4	England	3	2	0	1	107	53	+54	15	5	2	10
B2	5	Australia	3	2	0	1	78	83	−5	11	11	2	10
C2	6	Ireland	3	2	0	1	45	61	−16	2	6	0	8
A3	7	Wales	3	1	0	2	92	52	+40	12	7	1	5
C3	8	Scotland	3	1	0	2	59	98	−39	6	11	1	5
B3	9	Samoa	3	1	0	2	60	98	−38	7	14	0	4
C4	10	Argentina	3	0	0	3	51	79	−28	3	7	2	2
B4	11	Italy	3	0	0	3	44	94	−50	7	12	2	2
A4	12	Japan	3	0	0	3	17	172	−155	2	26	0	0

== Knockout stage ==
=== 9–12th place play-offs ===
Semi-finals
Samoa	12
Japan	29
Argentina	46
Italy	5

9th place
Japan	21
Argentina	38
11th place
Samoa	19
Italy	20

==== Semi-finals ====
15 June 2015	Argentina	46–5	Italy	Stadio Luigi Zaffanella, Viadana
16:30	Try: Miotti 9' c Velez (2) 13' c, 18' m Bartoloni 31' c Granella 40' m Domínguez 55' m Gauna 72' c Con: Miotti (3/5) 9', 14', 32'; Boffelli (1/2) 73'; Pen: Boffelli (1/3) 50'	Stats	Try: Luus 44' m	Referee: Lloyd Linton (Scotland)

15 June 2015	Samoa	12–29	Japan	Stadio Luigi Zaffanella, Viadana
18:30	Try: Kueffner-Mulitalo 51' c Con: Falaniko (1/1) 52' c Winterstein 60' m Pen: Falaniko (1/2) 52'	Stats	Try: Makisi 25' m Noguchi 38' c Horikosh 47' c Penalty try 55' c Con: Noguchi (3/4) 39', 48', 56'; Pen: Noguchi (1/1) 74'	Referee: Gary Conway (Ireland)

==== 11th place game ====
20 June 2015	Samoa	19–20	Italy	Stadio Giovanni Zini, Cremona
16:30	Try: Tiatia 15' c Con: Falaniko (1/1) 16'; Pen: Falaniko (4/8) 12', 19', 45', 60'	Stats	Try: Penalty try (2) 57' c, 73' c Con: Azzolini (2/2) 58', 74'; Pen: Azzolini (1/1) 3'; Minozzi (1/1) 24'	Referee: Gary Conway (Ireland)

==== 9th place game ====
20 June 2015	Japan	21–38	Argentina	Stadio Luigi Zaffanella, Viadana
18:30	Try: Tatafu (2) 5' c, 51' c Yatomi 33' c Con: Noguchi (3/3) 6', 34', 52'	Stats	Try: Deheza (2) 20' m, 39' c Achilli 26' m Larrague 58' c Gauna 69' c Boffelli 76' c Con: Boffelli (4/6) 40', 59', 70', 77'	Referee: Elia Rizzo (Italy)

=== 5–8th place play-offs ===
Semi-finals
Australia	31
Scotland	21
Ireland	12
Wales	22

5th place
Australia	28
Wales	23
7th place
Scotland	9
Ireland	17

==== Semi-finals ====
15 June 2015	Australia	31–21	Scotland	Stadio San Michele, Calvisano
16:30	Try: Placid (2) 22' m, 54' c Lealaiauloto-Tui 43' m McInerney 47' c Sandell 62' c Con: Deegan (3/5) 48', 55', 63'	Stats	Try: Coombes 5' c Galloway 73' c Penalty try 79' c Con: Kinghorn (1/1) 6'; Horne (2/2) 74', 80'	Referee: Elia Rizzo (Italy)

15 June 2015	Ireland	12–22	Wales	Stadio Luigi Zaffanella, Viadana
20:30	Try: Gaffney 44'; Rock 72' m Con: Carbery (1/2) 45'	Stats	Try: Howells 8' m Davies 14' c Adams 19' c Con: Evans (2/3) 15', 19'; Pen: Evans (1/1) 38'	Referee: Will Houston (Australia)

==== 7th place game ====
20 June 2015	Scotland	9–17	Ireland	Stadio Luigi Zaffanella, Viadana
20:30	Pen: Kinghorn (2/4) 6', 24'; Horne (1/1) 69'	Stats	Try: Fitzgerald (2) 9' c, 72' c Con: Carbery (1/1) 10'; Ringrose (1/1) 73'; Pen: Ringrose (1/1) 50'	Referee: Shuhei Kubo (Japan)

==== 5th place game ====
20 June 2015	Australia	28–23	Wales	Stadio Luigi Zaffanella, Viadana
16:30	Try: Korczyk 5' c Lealaiaulolo-Tui 19' c Fainga'a 62' c Placid 66' c Con: Deegan (4/4) 6', 20', 63', 67'	Stats	Try: Adams 14' m Wyn Benham 68' m Lewis 79' c Con: Jones (1/3) 80'; Pen: Jones (2/3) 48', 56'	Referee: Lloyd Linton (Scotland)

=== Finals ===
Semi-finals
South Africa	20
England	28
New Zealand	45
France	7

Final
England	16
New Zealand	21
3rd place
South Africa	31
France	18

==== Semi-finals ====
15 June 2015	New Zealand	45–7	France	Stadio San Michele, Calvisano
18:30	Try: Li (3) 11' c, 30' c, 53' c Ioane (2) 27' c, 34' c Goodhue 78' c Con: Black (6/6) 12', 28', 31', 35', 54', 79'; Pen: Black (1/1) 4'	Stats	Try: Castets 8' c Con: Ramos (1/1) 9'	Referee: Ben Whitehouse (Wales)

15 June 2015	South Africa	20–28	England	Stadio San Michele, Calvisano
20:30	Try: Jaer 77' c Du Plessis 79' c Con: Thomson (2/2) 77', 79'; Pen: Thomson (2/3) 7', 20'	Stats	Try: Chisholm 25' m Penalty try 39' c Tompkins 70' c Con: Jennings (2/3) 40', 71'; Pen: Jennings (3/5) 4', 10', 54'	Referee: Brendon Pickerill (New Zealand)

==== 3rd place game ====
20 June 2015	France	18–31	South Africa	Stadio Giovanni Zini, Cremona
18:30	Try: Bonneval 11' m Delannoy 42' m Blanc 48' m Pen: Meret (1/1) 8'	Stats	Try: Du Toit 21' c Jenkins 28' c Du Preez (2) 33' c, 38' c Con: Thomson (4/4) 22', 29', 35', 39'; Pen: Thomson (1/3) 66'	Referee: Matthew Carley (England)

==== Final ====
20 June 2015	New Zealand	21–16	England	Stadio Giovanni Zini, Cremona
20:30	Try: Aso 25' m Ioane 45' c Con: Black (1/2) 46'; Pen: Black (3/4) 8', 36', 58'	Stats	Try: Clark 3' c Con: Jennings (1/1) 5'; Pen: Jennings (3/4) 12', 49', 56'	Referee: Will Houston (Australia)
