= 2014–15 Serie A (rugby union) =

Italian Rugby Championship

2014–15 Serie A is the second tier of the Italian Rugby Union championship.

== Group 1 ==
	Team	Points	Played	W	D	L	Pf:Pa	Diff.	Status
1	Conad Reggio	31	10	7	0	3	221:185	36	Advanced to the stage promotion
2	Sitav Lyons Piacenza	30	10	6	1	3	266:179	87	Advanced to the stage promotion
3	Pro Recco Rugby	25	10	5	1	4	239:209	30	Advanced to the stage promotion
4	CUS Torino Rugby	21	10	4	0	6	207:245	-38	Contested the relegation phase
5	CUS Genova Rugby	18	10	4	0	6	188:239	-51	Contested the relegation phase
6	Chef Piacenza Rugby Club	13	10	3	0	7	156:220	-64	Contested the relegation phase

=== Matchday 1 ===
Sunday, October 5, 2014, 3:30pm
CUS Torino Rugby	24 : 26	Conad Reggio
Pro Recco Rugby	16 : 16	Sitav Lyons Piacenza
Chef Piacenza Rugby Club	28 : 17	CUS Genova Rugby

=== Matchday 2 ===
Sunday, October 12, 2014, 3:30pm
Conad Reggio	17 : 13	Pro Recco Rugby
CUS Genova Rugby	21 : 30	CUS Torino Rugby
Sitav Lyons Piacenza	25 : 0	Chef Piacenza Rugby Club

=== Matchday 3 ===
Sunday, October 19, 2014, 3:30pm
Pro Recco Rugby	36 : 6	CUS Genova Rugby
Chef Piacenza Rugby Club	19 : 22	CUS Torino Rugby
Conad Reggio	16 : 39	Sitav Lyons Piacenza

=== Matchday 4 ===
Sunday, October 26, 2014, 2:30pm
Chef Piacenza Rugby Club	16 : 26	Pro Recco Rugby
CUS Torino Rugby	15 : 41	Sitav Lyons Piacenza
CUS Genova Rugby	16 : 10	Conad Reggio

=== Matchday 5 ===
Sunday, November 2, 2014, 2:30pm
Pro Recco Rugby	28 : 27	CUS Torino Rugby
Sitav Lyons Piacenza	24 : 16	CUS Genova Rugby
Conad Reggio	25 : 14	Chef Piacenza Rugby Club

=== Matchday 6 ===
Sunday, November 9, 2014, 2:30pm
Sitav Lyons Piacenza	40 : 19	Pro Recco Rugby
Conad Reggio	40 : 12	CUS Torino Rugby
CUS Genova Rugby	22 : 13	Chef Piacenza Rugby Club

=== Matchday 7 ===
Sunday, November 30, 2014, 2:30pm
Pro Recco Rugby	33 : 14	Conad Reggio
CUS Torino Rugby	13 : 10	CUS Torino Rugby
Chef Piacenza Rugby Club	23 : 17	Sitav Lyons Piacenza

=== Matchday 8 ===
Sunday, December 7, 2014, 2:30pm
CUS Genova Rugby	27 : 22	Pro Recco Rugby
CUS Torino Rugby	16 : 18	Chef Piacenza Rugby Club
Sitav Lyons Piacenza	12 : 16	Conad Reggio

=== Matchday 9 ===
Sunday, December 14, 2014, 2:30pm
Pro Recco Rugby	29 : 15	Chef Piacenza Rugby Club
Sitav Lyons Piacenza	25 : 17	CUS Torino Rugby
Conad Reggio	36 : 12	CUS Genova Rugby

=== Matchday 10 ===
Sunday, December 21, 2014, 2:30pm
CUS Torino Rugby	31 : 17	Pro Recco Rugby
CUS Genova Rugby	41 : 27	Sitav Lyons Piacenza
Chef Piacenza Rugby Club	10 : 21	Conad Reggio

== Group 2 ==
POS	Team	Points	Played	W	D	L	Pf:Pa	Diff.	Status
1	HBS Colomo	46	10	10	0	0	351:132	219	Advanced to the stage promotion
2	F&M CUS Verona	36	10	8	0	2	219:148	71	Advanced to the stage promotion
3	Junior Rugby Brescia	28	10	6	0	4	157:177	-20	Advanced to the stage promotion
4	Cus Milano Rugby ASD	16	10	3	0	7	169:213	-44	Contested the relegation phase
5	Patarò Rugby Lumezzane	15	10	2	0	8	188:266	-78	Contested the relegation phase
6	S.M. Valpolicella	5	10	1	0	9	88:236	-148	Contested the relegation phase

=== Matchday 1 ===
Sunday, October 5, 2014, 3:30pm
Patarò Rugby Lumezzane	33 : 35	HBS Colomo
F&M CUS Verona	29 : 12	S.M. Valpolicella
Cus Milano Rugby ASD	6 : 22	Junior Rugby Brescia

=== Matchday 2 ===
Sunday, October 12, 2014, 3:30pm
S.M. Valpolicella	16 : 0	Patarò Rugby Lumezzane
Junior Rugby Brescia	7 : 11	F&M CUS Verona
HBS Colomo	38 : 10	Cus Milano Rugby ASD

=== Matchday 3 ===
Sunday, October 19, 2014, 3:30pm
S.M. Valpolicella	5 : 20	HBS Colomo
Cus Milano Rugby ASD	19 : 42	F&M CUS Verona
Patarò Rugby Lumezzane	21 : 28	Junior Rugby Brescia

=== Matchday 4 ===
Sunday, October 26, 2014, 2:30pm
Junior Rugby Brescia	17 : 12	S.M. Valpolicella
F&M CUS Verona	12 : 14	HBS Colomo
Cus Milano Rugby ASD	26 : 13	Patarò Rugby Lumezzane

=== Matchday 5 ===
Sunday, November 2, 2014, 2:30pm
S.M. Valpolicella	6 : 26	Cus Milano Rugby ASD
HBS Colomo	49 : 27	Junior Rugby Brescia
Patarò Rugby Lumezzane	24 : 27	F&M CUS Verona

=== Matchday 6 ===
Sunday, November 9, 2014, 2:30pm
HBS Colomo	58 : 5	Patarò Rugby Lumezzane
S.M. Valpolicella	3 : 11	F&M CUS Verona
Junior Rugby Brescia	7 : 3	Cus Milano Rugby ASD

=== Matchday 7 ===
Sunday, November 30, 2014, 2:30pm
Patarò Rugby Lumezzane	28 : 7	S.M. Valpolicella
F&M CUS Verona	34 : 0	Junior Rugby Brescia
Cus Milano Rugby ASD	18 : 20	HBS Colomo

=== Matchday 8 ===
Sunday, December 7, 2014, 2:30pm
Junior Rugby Brescia	15 : 13	Patarò Rugby Lumezzane
F&M CUS Verona	19 : 8	Cus Milano Rugby ASD
HBS Colomo	55 : 5	S.M. Valpolicella

=== Matchday 9 ===
Sunday, December 14, 2014, 2:30pm
Patarò Rugby Lumezzane	32 : 20	Cus Milano Rugby ASD
HBS Colomo	42 : 0	F&M CUS Verona
S.M. Valpolicella	8 : 17	Junior Rugby Brescia

=== Matchday 10 ===
Sunday, December 21, 2014, 2:30pm
F&M CUS Verona	34 : 19	Patarò Rugby Lumezzane
Junior Rugby Brescia	17 : 20	HBS Colomo
Cus Milano Rugby ASD	33 : 14	S.M. Valpolicella

== Group 3 ==
POS	Team	Points	Played	W	D	L	Pf:Pa	Diff.	Status
1	Volteco Ruggers Tarvisium	35	10	8	0	2	198:179	19	Advanced to the stage promotion
2	Valsugana Rugby Padova	31	10	7	0	3	194:151	43	Advanced to the stage promotion
3	ASD Rugby Udine 1928	27	10	5	1	4	239:163	76	Advanced to the stage promotion
4	Rangers Rugby Vicenza	21	10	4	0	6	138:148	-10	Contested the relegation phase
5	Amatori R. Badia	13	10	3	1	6	202:263	-61	Contested the relegation phase
6	Rubano Rugby	13	10	2	0	8	148:215	-67	Contested the relegation phase

=== Matchday 1 ===
Sunday, October 5, 2014, 3:30pm
Amatori R. Badia	22 : 28	Valsugana Rugby Padova
Rubano Rugby	18 : 24	Volteco Ruggers Tarvisium
Rangers Rugby Vicenza	17 : 18	ASD Rugby Udine 1928

=== Matchday 2 ===
Sunday, October 12, 2014, 3:30pm
ASD Rugby Udine 1928	17 : 30	Amatori R. Badia
Volteco Ruggers Tarvisium	22 : 3	Rangers Rugby Vicenza
Valsugana Rugby Padova	16 : 9	Rubano Rugby

=== Matchday 3 ===
Sunday, October 19, 2014, 3:30pm
ASD Rugby Udine 1928	41 : 7	Valsugana Rugby Padova
Rubano Rugby	11 : 16	Rangers Rugby Vicenza
Amatori R. Badia	27 : 35	Volteco Ruggers Tarvisium

=== Matchday 4 ===
Sunday, October 26, 2014, 2:30pm
Rubano Rugby	20 : 6	Amatori R. Badia
Rangers Rugby Vicenza	25 : 18	Valsugana Rugby Padova
Volteco Ruggers Tarvisium	24 : 16	ASD Rugby Udine 1928

=== Matchday 5 ===
Sunday, November 2, 2014, 2:30pm
Amatori R. Badia	25 : 18	Rangers Rugby Vicenza
ASD Rugby Udine 1928	40 : 12	Rubano Rugby
Valsugana Rugby Padova	28 : 16	Volteco Ruggers Tarvisium

=== Matchday 6 ===
Sunday, November 9, 2014, 2:30pm
Volteco Ruggers Tarvisium	32 : 15	Rubano Rugby
ASD Rugby Udine 1928	12 : 8	Rangers Rugby Vicenza
Valsugana Rugby Padova	46 : 0	Amatori R. Badia

=== Matchday 7 ===
Sunday, November 30, 2014, 2:30pm
Amatori R. Badia	29 : 29	ASD Rugby Udine 1928
Rangers Rugby Vicenza	6 : 12	Volteco Ruggers Tarvisium
Rubano Rugby	16 : 20	Valsugana Rugby Padova

=== Matchday 8 ===
Sunday, December 7, 2014, 2:30pm
Volteco Ruggers Tarvisium	25 : 23	Amatori R. Badia
Rangers Rugby Vicenza	13 : 8	Rubano Rugby
Valsugana Rugby Padova	13 : 11	ASD Rugby Udine 1928

=== Matchday 9 ===
Sunday, December 14, 2014, 2:30pm
Amatori R. Badia	33 : 16	Rubano Rugby
Valsugana Rugby Padova	15 : 3	Rangers Rugby Vicenza
ASD Rugby Udine 1928	40 : 0	Volteco Ruggers Tarvisium

=== Matchday 10 ===
Sunday, December 21, 2014, 2:30pm
Rangers Rugby Vicenza	29 : 7	Amatori R. Badia
Volteco Ruggers Tarvisium	8 : 3	Valsugana Rugby Padova
Rubano Rugby	23 : 15	ASD Rugby Udine 1928

== Group 4 ==
POS	Team	Points	Played	W	D	L	Pf:Pa	Diff.	Status
1	Acc. Naz. I. Francescato	37	10	7	0	3	366:164	202	Advanced to the stage promotion
2	Gran Sasso Rugby	37	10	8	0	2	216:209	7	Advanced to the stage promotion
3	U.R. Prato Sesto	23	10	5	0	5	201:268	-67	Advanced to the stage promotion
4	Firenze Rugby 1931	22	10	4	0	6	199:205	-6	Contested the relegation phase
5	Unione R. Capitolina	20	10	4	0	6	171:206	-35	Contested the relegation phase
6	CUS Perugia	9	10	2	0	8	170:271	-101	Contested the relegation phase

=== Matchday 1 ===
Sunday, October 5, 2014, 3:30pm
Gran Sasso Rugby	27 : 19	CUS Perugia
U.R. Prato Sesto	29 : 46	Acc. Naz. I. Francescato
Unione R. Capitolina	17 : 15	Firenze Rugby 1931

=== Matchday 2 ===
Sunday, October 12, 2014, 3:30pm
Acc. Naz. I. Francescato	20 : 13	Unione R. Capitolina
Firenze Rugby 1931	25 : 28	Gran Sasso Rugby
CUS Perugia	28 : 20	U.R. Prato Sesto

=== Matchday 3 ===
Sunday, October 19, 2014, 3:30pm
CUS Perugia	27 : 24	Acc. Naz. I. Francescato
Unione R. Capitolina	17 : 24	Gran Sasso Rugby
U.R. Prato Sesto	25 : 23	Firenze Rugby 1931

=== Matchday 4 ===
Sunday, October 26, 2014, 2:30pm
Unione R. Capitolina	24 : 19	U.R. Prato Sesto
Gran Sasso Rugby	24 : 23	Acc. Naz. I. Francescato
Firenze Rugby 1931	22 : 17	CUS Perugia

=== Matchday 5 ===
Sunday, November 2, 2014
Acc. Naz. I. Francescato	12 : 16	Firenze Rugby 1931
CUS Perugia	16 : 29	Unione R. Capitolina
U.R. Prato Sesto	21 : 16	Gran Sasso Rugby

=== Matchday 6 ===
Sunday, November 9, 2014, 2:30pm
Acc. Naz. I. Francescato	71 : 5	U.R. Prato Sesto
CUS Perugia	15 : 31	Gran Sasso Rugby
Firenze Rugby 1931	21 : 19	Unione R. Capitolina

=== Matchday 7 ===
Sunday, November 30, 2014, 2:30pm
U.R. Prato Sesto	28 : 6	CUS Perugia
Gran Sasso Rugby	24 : 13	Firenze Rugby 1931
Acc. Naz. I. Francescato	45 : 20	Unione R. Capitolina

=== Matchday 8 ===
Sunday, December 7, 2014, 2:30pm
Firenze Rugby 1931	18 : 20	U.R. Prato Sesto
Gran Sasso Rugby	16 : 3	Unione R. Capitolina
Acc. Naz. I. Francescato	40 : 15	CUS Perugia

=== Matchday 9 ===
Sunday, December 14, 2014, 2:30pm
CUS Perugia	17 : 31	Firenze Rugby 1931
Acc. Naz. I. Francescato	59 : 0	Gran Sasso Rugby
U.R. Prato Sesto	20 : 10	Unione R. Capitolina

=== Matchday 10 ===
Sunday, December 14, 2014, 2:30pm
Gran Sasso Rugby	26 : 14	U.R. Prato Sesto
Firenze Rugby 1931	15 : 26	Acc. Naz. I. Francescato
Unione R. Capitolina	19 : 10	CUS Perugia

== Promotion Pool 1 ==
POS	Team	Points	Played	W	D	L	Pf:Pa	Diff.
1	Pro Recco Rugby	38	10	8	0	2	247:189	58
2	Sitav Lyons Piacenza	36	10	7	0	3	313:182	131
3	Acc. Naz. I. Francescato	27	10	5	0	5	305:175	130
4	Conad Reggio	26	10	6	0	4	217:192	25
5	Gran Sasso Rugby	21	10	4	0	6	191:298	-107
6	U.R. Prato Sesto	2	10	0	0	10	157:394	-237

=== Matchday 1 ===
Sunday, January 18, 2015, 3:30pm
Sitav Lyons Piacenza	33 : 10	Gran Sasso Rugby
U.R. Prato Sesto	12 : 27	Pro Recco Rugby
Acc. Naz. I. Francescato	17 : 21	Conad Reggio

=== Matchday 2 ===
Sunday, January 25, 2015, 3:30pm
Pro Recco Rugby	16 : 15	Sitav Lyons Piacenza
Conad Reggio	26 : 13	U.R. Prato Sesto
Gran Sasso Rugby	0 : 42	Acc. Naz. I. Francescato

=== Matchday 3 ===
Sunday, February 1, 2015, 3:30pm
Sitav Lyons Piacenza	28 : 20	Conad Reggio
Acc. Naz. I. Francescato	38 : 18	U.R. Prato Sesto
Pro Recco Rugby	34 : 8	Gran Sasso Rugby

=== Matchday 4 ===
Sunday, February 22, 2015, 3:30pm
Acc. Naz. I. Francescato	21 : 29	Sitav Lyons Piacenza
U.R. Prato Sesto	31 : 32	Gran Sasso Rugby
Conad Reggio	12 : 24	Pro Recco Rugby

=== Matchday 5 ===
Sunday, March 8, 2015, 2:30pm
Sitav Lyons Piacenza	89 : 12	U.R. Prato Sesto
Gran Sasso Rugby	26 : 17	Conad Reggio
Pro Recco Rugby	24 : 20	Acc. Naz. I. Francescato

=== Matchday 6 ===
Sunday, March 29, 2015, 3:30pm
Gran Sasso Rugby	29 : 28	Sitav Lyons Piacenza
Pro Recco Rugby	47 : 7	U.R. Prato Sesto
Conad Reggio	31 : 17	Acc. Naz. I. Francescato

=== Matchday 7 ===
Sunday, April 12, 2015, 3:30pm
Sitav Lyons Piacenza	15 : 13	Pro Recco Rugby
U.R. Prato Sesto	12 : 37	Conad Reggio
Acc. Naz. I. Francescato	39 : 15	Gran Sasso Rugby

=== Matchday 8 ===
Sunday, April 19, 2015, 3:30pm
Conad Reggio	21 : 20	Sitav Lyons Poacenza
U.R. Prato Sesto	7 : 29	Acc. Naz. I. Francescato
Gran Sasso Rugby	25 : 30	Pro Recco Rugby

=== Matchday 9 ===
Sunday, April 26, 2015, 3:30pm
Sitav Lyons Piacenza	23 : 15	Acc. Naz. I. Francescato
Gran Sasso Rugby	36 : 20	U.R. Prato Sesto
Pro Recco Rugby	25 : 8	Conad Reggio

=== Matchday 10 ===
Friday, May 1, 2015, 5:00pm
U.R. Prato Sesto	25 : 33	Sitav Lyons Piacenza
Saturday, May 2, 2015, 3:30pm
Acc. Naz. I. Francescato	67 : 7	Pro Recco Rugby
Sunday, May 3, 2015, 3:30pm
Conad Reggio	24 : 10	Gran Sasso Rugby

== Promotion Pool 2 ==
POS	Team	Points	Played	W	D	L	Pf:Pa	Diff.
1	HBS Colorno	37	10	8	0	2	267:148	119
2	F&M CUS Verona	29	10	5	0	5	225:166	59
3	Valsugana Rugby Padova	27	10	6	0	4	182:206	-24
4	Volteco Ruggers Tarvisium	21	10	5	0	5	177:190	-13
5	ASD Rugby Udine 1928	19	10	4	0	6	185:202	-17
6	Junior Rugby Brescia	11	10	2	0	8	99:223	-124

=== Matchday 1 ===
Sunday, January 18, 2015, 3:30pm
Volteco Ruggers Tarvisium	30 : 0	Junior Rugby Brescia
Valsugana Rugby Padova	16 : 14	F&M CUS Verona
HBS Colorno	47 : 17	ASD Rugby Udine 1928

=== Matchday 2 ===
Sunday, January 25, 2015
12:00pm
F&M CUS Verona	32 : 21	Volteco Ruggers Varvisium
3:30pm
ASD Rugby Udine 1928	15 : 20	Valsugana Rugby Padova
Junior Rugby Brescia	19 : 20	HBS Colorno

=== Matchday 3 ===
Sunday, February 1, 2015, 3:30pm
Volteco Ruggers Tarvisium	31 : 20	ASD Rugby Udine 1928
HBS Colorno	54 : 5	Valsugana Rugby Padova
F&M CUS Verona	20 : 3	Junior Rugby Brescia

=== Matchday 4 ===
Sunday, February 22, 2015, 3:30pm
HBS Colorno	20 : 10	Volteco Ruggers Tarvisium
Valsugana Rugby Padova	16 : 7	Junior Rugby Brescia
ASD Rugby Udine 1928	10 : 29	F&M CUS Verona

=== Matchday 5 ===
Sunday, March 8, 2015, 2:30pm
Volteco Ruggers Tarvisium	23 : 21	Valsugana Rugby Padova
Junior Rugby Brescia	18 : 10	ASD Rugby Udine 1928
F&M CUS Verona	15 : 18	HBS Colorno

=== Matchday 6 ===
Sunday, March 29, 2015, 3:30pm
Junior Rugby Brescia	6 : 10	Volteco Ruggers Tarvisium
F&M CUS Verona	12 : 16	Valsugana Rugby Padova
ASD Rugby Udine 1928	6 : 7	HBS Colorno

=== Matchday 7 ===
Sunday, April 12, 2015, 3:30pm
Volteco Ruggers Tarvisium	20 : 15	F&M CUS Verona
Valsugana Rugby Padova	25 : 28	ASD Rugby Udine 1928
HBS Colorno	36 : 8	Junior Rugby Brescia

=== Matchday 8 ===
Sunday, April 19, 2015, 3:30pm
ASD Rugby Udine 1928	18 : 3	Volteco Ruggers Tarivisium
Valsugana Rugby Padova	15 : 13	HBS Colorno
Junior Rugby Brescia	8 : 32	F&M CUS Verona

=== Matchday 9 ===
Sunday, April 26, 2015, 3:30pm
Volteco Ruggers Tarvisium	19 : 31	HBS Colorno
Junior Rugby Brescia	30 : 21	Valsugana Rugby Padova
F&M CUS Verona	22 : 33	ASD Rugby Udine 1928

=== Matchday 10 ===
Sunday, May 3, 2015, 3:30pm
Valsugana Rugby Padova	27 : 10	Volteco Ruggers Tarvisium
ASD Rugby Udine 1928	28 : 0	Junior Rugby Brescia
HBS Colorno	21 : 34	F&M CUS Verona

== Relegation Pool 1 ==
POS	Team	Points	Played	W	D	L	Pf:Pa	Diff.
1	Unione R. Capitolina	32	10	6	1	3	239:171	68
2	CUS Genova	32	10	7	0	3	239:207	32
3	CUS Torino	26	10	5	0	5	241:252	-11
4	CUS Perugia	23	10	4	2	4	210:209	1
5	Chef Piacenza Rugby Club	20	10	3	1	6	200:221	-21
6	Firenze Rugby 1931	15	10	3	0	7	147:216	-69

=== Matchday 1 ===
Sunday, January 18, 2015, 3:30pm
CUS Genova	36 : 7	CUS Torino
CUS Perugia	27 : 19	Firenze Rugby 1931
Unione R. Capitolina	35 : 15	Chef Piacenza Rugby Club

=== Matchday 2 ===
Sunday, January 25, 2015, 3:30pm
Firenze Rugby 1931	27 : 14	CUS Genova
Chef Piacenza Rugby Club	20 : 18	CUS Perugia
CUS Torino	15 : 0	Unione R. Capitolina

=== Matchday 3 ===
Sunday, February 1, 2015
CUS Genova	24 : 18	Chef Piacenza Rugby Club
Unione R. Capitolina	27 : 23	CUS Perugia
Firenze Rugby 1931	22 : 24	CUS Torino

=== Matchday 4 ===
Sunday, February 22, 2015, 3:30pm
Unione R. Capitolina	22 : 17	CUS Genova
CUS Perugia	10 : 18	CUS Torino
Chef Piacenza Rugby Club	6 : 9	Firenze Rugby 1931

=== Matchday 5 ===
Sunday, March 8, 2015, 2:30pm
CUS Geonva	23 : 29	CUS Perugia
CUS Torino	43 : 36	Chef Piacenza Rugby Club
Firenze Rugby 1931	17 : 16	Unione R. Capitolina

=== Matchday 6 ===
Sunday, March 29, 2015, 3:30pm
CUS Torino	24 : 27	CUS Genova
Firenze Rugby 1931	5 : 16	CUS Perugia
Chef Piacenza Rugby Club	16 : 23	Unione R. Capitolina

=== Matchday 7 ===
Sunday, April 12, 2015, 3:30pm
CUS Genova	16 : 15	Firenze Rugby 1931
CUS Perugia	12 : 12	Chef Piacenza Rugby Club
Unione R. Capitolina	46 : 20	CUS Torino

=== Matchday 8 ===
Sunday, April 19, 2015, 3:30pm
Chef Piacenza Rugby Club	22 : 24	CUS Genova
CUS Perugia	18 : 18	Unione R. Capitolina
CUS Torino	44 : 7	Firenze Rugby 1931

=== Matchday 9 ===
Sunday, April 26, 2015, 3:30pm
CUS Genova	20 : 18	Unione R. Capitolina
CUS Torino	29 : 32	CUS Perugia
Firenze Rugby 1931	16 : 19	Chef Piacenza Rugby Club

=== Matchday 10 ===
Saturday, May 2, 2015, 6:00pm
Chef Piacenza Rugby Club	36 : 17	CUS Torino
Sunday, May 3, 2015, 3:30pm
CUS Perugia	25 : 38	CUS Genova
Unione R. Capitolina	34 : 10	Firenze Rugby 1931

== Relegation Pool 2 ==
POS	Team	Points	Played	W	D	L	Pf:Pa	Diff.
1	S.M. Valpolicella	33	10	6	0	4	275:200	75
2	Patarò Rugby Lumezzane	30	10	6	1	3	263:213	50
3	Rangers Rugby Vicenza	28	10	6	0	4	227:195	32
4	Cus Milano Rugby ASD	24	10	5	0	5	219:211	8
5	Amatori R. Badia	19	10	3	0	7	199:267	-68
6	Rubano Rugby	16	10	3	1	6	161:258	-97

=== Matchday 1 ===
Sunday, January 18, 2015, 3:30pm
Patarò Rugby Lumezzane	48 : 15	Amatori R. Badia
Rangers Rugby Vicenza	34 : 16	Rubano Rugby
S.M. Valpolicella	34 : 20	Cus Milano Rugby ASD

=== Matchday 2 ===
Sunday, January 25, 2015, 3:30pm
Rubano Rugby	24 : 24	Patarò Rugby Lumezzane
Cus Milano Rugby ASD	21 : 15	Rangers Rugby Vicenza
Amatori R. Badia	3 : 31	S.M. Valpolicella

=== Matchday 3 ===
Sunday, February 1, 2015, 3:30pm
Patarò Rugby Lumezzane	33 : 20	Cus Milano Rugby ASD
S.M. Valpolicella	43 : 20	Rangers Rugby Vicenza
Rubano Rugby	8 : 3	Amatori R. Badia

=== Matchday 4 ===
Sunday, February 22, 2015, 3:30pm
S.M. Valpolicella	5 : 11	Patarò Rugby Lumezzane
Rangers Rugby Vicenza	31 : 12	Amatori R. Badia
Cus Milano Rugby ASD	32 : 0	Rubano Rugby

=== Matchday 5 ===
Sunday, March 8, 2015, 2:30pm
Patarò Rugby Lumezzane	37 : 30	Rangers Rugby Vicenza
Amatori R. Badia	41 : 14	Cus Milano Rugby ASD
Rubano Rugby	16 : 26	S.M. Valpolicella

=== Matchday 6 ===
Sunday, March 29, 2015, 3:30pm
Amatori R. Badia	27 : 34	Patarò Rugby Lumezzane
Rubano Rugby	3 : 25	Rangers Rugby Vicenza
Cus Milano Rugby ASD	23 : 19	S.M. Valpolicella

=== Matchday 7 ===
Sunday, April 12, 2015, 3:30pm
Patarò Rugby Lumezzane	22 : 23	Rubano Rugby
Rangers Rugby Vicenza	10 : 3	Cus Milano Rugby ASD
S.M. Valpolicella	31 : 26	Amatori R. Badia

=== Matchday 8 ===
Sunday, April 19, 2015, 3:30pm
Cus Milano Rugby ASD	36 : 16	Patarò Rugby Lumezzane
Rangers Rugby Vicenza	30 : 19	S.M. Valpolicella
Amatori R. Badia	24 : 22	Rubano Rugby

=== Matchday 9 ===
Sunday, April 26, 2015, 3:30pm
Patarò Rugby Lumezzane	25 : 19	S.M. Valpolicella
Amatori R. Badia	28 : 18	Rangers Rugby Vicenza
Rubano Rugby	23 : 20	Cus Milano Rugby ASD

=== Matchday 10 ===
Sunday, May 3, 2015, 3:30pm
Rangers Rugby Vicenza	14 : 13	Patarò Rugby Lumezzane
Cus Milano Rugby ASD	30 : 20	Amatori R. Badia
S.M. Valpolicella	48 : 26	Rubano Rugby
