= Angelo Leaupepe =

New Zealand rugby union player

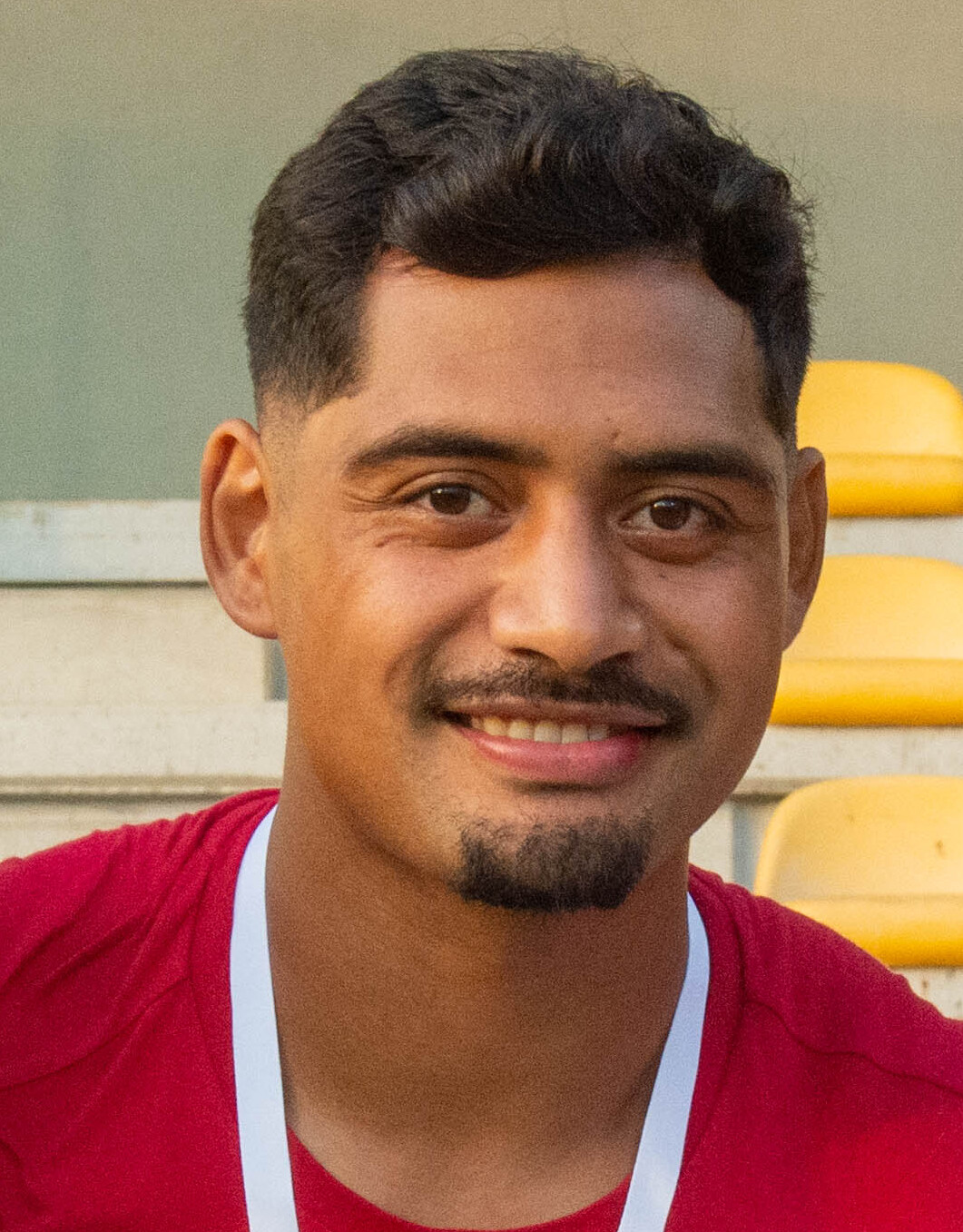
- Leaupepe in 2022
- Full name: Angelo Heinz Panetaleo Leaupepe
- Born: 29 July 1997 (age 29) Redcliffe, Australia
- Height: 1.93 m (6 ft 4 in)
- Weight: 110 kg (243 lb; 17 st 5 lb)

Rugby union career
- Position: Wing
- Current team: Rangers Vicenza
Senior career
Years	Team	Apps	(Points)
2017−2018	Melbourne Rising	7	(15)
2018	Northern Suburbs	10	(25)
2018−2020	Petrarca Padova	22	(60)
2020−2022	Valorugby Emilia	12	(20)
2022−2024	Colorno	22	(55)
2024−2025	Petrarca Padova		
2025−	Rangers Vicenza		
- Correct as of 14 October 2020

Angelo Heinz Panetaleo Leaupepe (born 29 July 1997 in Redcliffe) is a New Zealand rugby union player. His usual position is as a wing, and he currently plays for Rangers Vicenza in the Italian Serie A Elite.

In 2017 and 2018, Leaupepe was named in the National Rugby Championship team Melbourne Rising. He played for Valorugby Emilia in Top12 from 2020 to 2022. He also played for Petrarca Padova until 2020. From 2022, he played for Colorno and for 2024−2025 season he signed for Petrarca Padova in the Italian Serie A Elite.
