= Matteo Panunzi =

Italian rugby union player (born 1997)

- Born: 12 May 1997 (age 29) Rome, Italy
- Height: 1.78 m (5 ft 10 in)
- Weight: 83 kg (13 st 1 lb; 183 lb)

Rugby union career
- Position: Scrum-Half
- Current team: Rangers Vicenza Rugby
Youth career
- Capitolina Roma
Senior career
Years	Team	Apps	(Points)
2015−2017	F.I.R. Academy		
2016	→Zebre	1	(0)
2017−2020	Valorugby Emilia	44	(40)
2020−2024	Petrarca Padova	41	(30)
2024−2025	Rangers Vicenza Rugby	0	(0)
- Correct as of 28 May 2020
International career
Years	Team	Apps	(Points)
2016−2017	Italy Under 20	8	(0)
- Correct as of 30 May 2020

Matteo Panunzi (born 12 May 1997 in Rome) is an Italian rugby union player. His usual position is as a Scrum-Half and he currently plays for Rangers Vicenza in Serie A Elite.

For 2015–16 Pro12 season, he named like Permit Player for Zebre. He played with Petrarca Padova from 2020 to 2024.

In 2016 and 2017, Panunzi was named in the Italy Under 20 squad.
