= Bogdan Voicu =

Romania international rugby union player

- Born: Bogdan Voicu; 16 December 1981 (age 44) Cluj-Napoca, Romania
- Height: 5 ft 11 in (180 cm)
- Weight: 180 lb (82 kg)
- Occupation: Gendarme

Rugby union career
- Position: Wing
Youth career
- 1997–2000: CSS Viitorul Cluj-Napoca
Senior career
Years	Team	Apps	(Points)
?	Universitatea Cluj	?	(?)
?	Timișoara	?	(?)
?	CUS Perugia	?	(?)
2005–06	Rugby Modena	?	(?)
2005–09	Dinamo București	?	(?)
2009–14	Universitatea Cluj	?	(?)
International career
Years	Team	Apps	(Points)
2003–05	Romania	8	(5)
Coaching career
- Years: Team
- 2004–05: Universitatea Cluj
- 2011: Universitatea Cluj

Bogdan Voicu (born 16 December 1981) is a former Romanian rugby union football player and coach. He played as a wing and fullback.

== Club career ==
During his career, Voicu played for Universitatea Cluj (on three occasions), Timișoara, CUS Perugia, Rugby Modena (both in Italy) and Dinamo București.

== International career ==
Voicu gathered 9 caps for Romania, from his debut in 2003 to his last game in 2005. He scored 1 try during his international career, 5 points on aggregate. He was a member of his national side for the 6th Rugby World Cup in 2003 and he played for Romania U21 at U21 RWC Johannesburg 2002.

== Honours ==
Dinamo București

- SuperLiga: 2007
