= Pardeep Singh (rugby union) =

- Full name: Singh Pardeep Roval
- Born: 29 April 1988 (age 38) India
- Height: 1.84 m (6 ft 0 in)
- Weight: 110 kg (243 lb; 17 st 5 lb)

Rugby union career
- Position: Prop
- Current team: Colorno
Youth career
- Rugby Noceto
Senior career
Years	Team	Apps	(Points)
2008−2010	Noceto		
2010−2013	Crociati Parma	33	(10)
2013−2015	Amatori Capoterra		
2015−2019	Lyons Piacenza	5	(0)
2019−2023	Colorno	75	(0)
- Correct as of 29 November 2020
- Correct as of 29 November 2020

Pardeep Singh (born 29 April 1988) is an Indian-born Italian rugby union player. His usual position is as a Prop and he played for Colorno in Top12 from 2019 to 2023.
