= Filippo Bozzoni =

Italian rugby union player (born 2003)

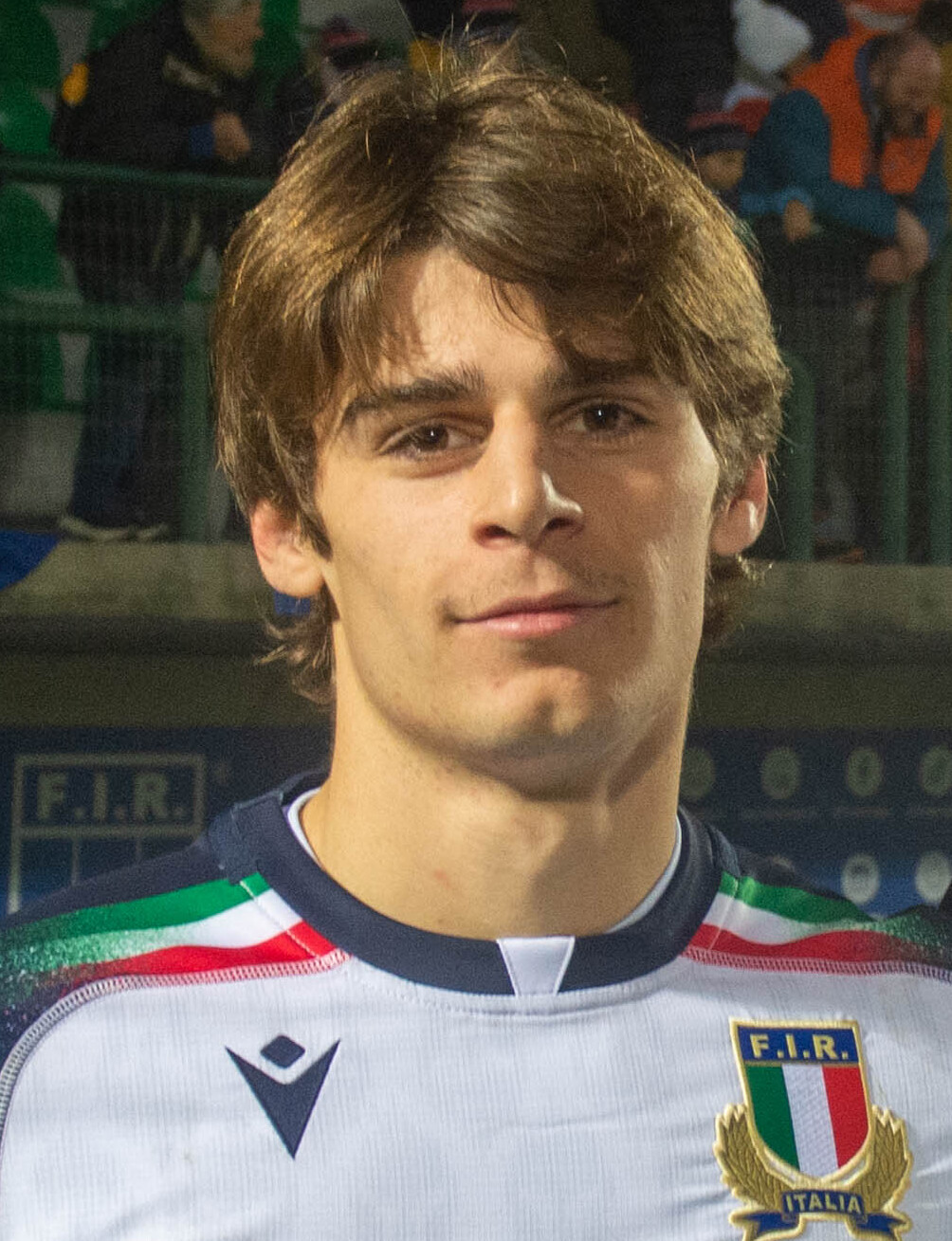
- Bozzoni in 2023
- Born: 3 January 2003 (age 23) Brescia, Italy
- Height: 177 cm (5 ft 10 in)
- Weight: 76 kg (168 lb; 12 st 0 lb)

Rugby union career
- Position: Wing
- Current team: Rugby Biella
Youth career
- Rugby Brescia
- Calvisano
Senior career
Years	Team	Apps	(Points)
2021–2023	Calvisano	13	(20)
2023–2025	Zebre Parma	1	(0)
2024–2025	→Valorugby Emilia	4	
2025–2026	Colorno		
2026	Calvisano		
2026–	Rugby Biella		
- Correct as of 10 Dec 2022
International career
Years	Team	Apps	(Points)
2022–2023	Italy U20	9	(10)
National sevens team
Years	Team		Comps
2023–	Italy Sevens		8

Filippo Bozzoni (born 3 January 2003) is an Italian professional rugby union player who plays wing for Colorno in the Italian Serie A Elite.

== Professional career ==
Bozzoni signed for Zebre Parma in May 2023 ahead of the 2023–24 United Rugby Championship. He made his debut in Round 1 of 2024–25 EPCR Challenge Cup against the Connacht. He played with Zebre Parma until 2025.

In 2022 and 2023 he was named in Italy U20s squad for annual Six Nations Under 20s Championship. On 30 November 2023 he was called in Italy Under 23 squad for test series against IRFU Combined Academies.

From 2023 he also named in the Italy Sevens squad.

== Personal life ==
His father, Aldo Bozzoni, was also a rugby player.
