= Piermaria Leso =

Italian rugby union player

- Born: 13 June 1991 (age 35) Verona, Italy
- Height: 1.83 m (6 ft 0 in)
- Weight: 115 kg (18 st 2 lb; 254 lb)

Rugby union career
- Position: Prop
- Current team: Rangers Vicenza Rugby
Youth career
- CUS Verona
- Valpolicella
- 2007−2009: Petrarca Padova
Senior career
Years	Team	Apps	(Points)
2009−2011	F.I.R. Academy		
2011−2015	Petrarca Padova	75	(10)
2015−2017	Valence Romans Drôme	31	(0)
2017−2023	Calvisano	105	(15)
2023−2025	Colorno	14	
2025−	Rangers Vicenza		
- Correct as of 15 October 2020
International career
Years	Team	Apps	(Points)
2010−2011	Italy Under 20	16	(0)
- Correct as of 15 October 2020

Piermaria Leso (born 13 June 1991) is an Italian rugby union player. His usual position is as a Prop and he currently plays for Rangers Vicenza in Italian Serie A Elite.

He played with Calvisano in Top10 until 2022−2023 season and for Colorno in Italian Serie A Elite until 2024–2025 season.

In 2010 and 2011, Leso was also named in the Italy Under 20.
