= Samuele Taddei =

Italian rugby union player

- Born: 4 July 2003 (age 23) Rome, Italy
- Height: 185 cm (6 ft 1 in)
- Weight: 113 kg (249 lb; 17 st 11 lb)

Rugby union career
- Position: Prop
- Current team: Valorugby Emilia
Youth career
- Frascati Rugby Union
- Rugby Noceto
- 2022−2023: Zebre Academy
Senior career
Years	Team	Apps	(Points)
2023–2025	Zebre Parma	1	(0)
2023–2025	→Colorno	14	(0)
2025–	Valorugby Emilia		
- Correct as of 10 Dec 2022
International career
Years	Team	Apps	(Points)
2023	Italy U20	7	(0)

Samuele Taddei (born 4 July 2003) is an Italian professional rugby union player who plays prop for Valorugby Emilia in the Italian Serie A Elite

== Professional career ==
Taddei signed for Zebre Parma in May 2022 ahead of the 2022–23 United Rugby Championship as Academy Player. He made his debut in Round 11 of the 2023–24 season against the Munster. He played on loan for to Colorno in the Italian Serie A Elite, as Additional Player, in 2023–24 and 2024–25 seasons.

In 2023 he was named in Italy U20s squad for annual Six Nations Under 20s Championship. On 30 November 2023 he was called in Italy Under 23 squad for test series against IRFU Combined Academies.
