= Samuela Vunisa =

Italy international rugby union player

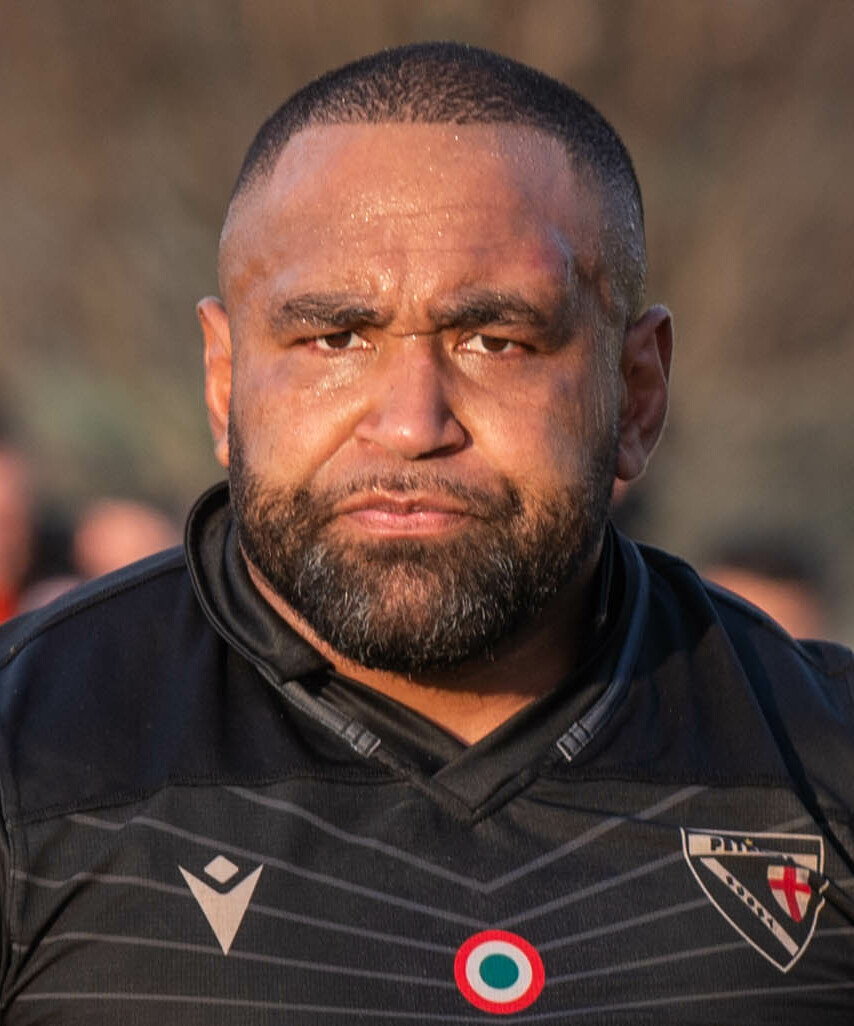
- Vunisa in 2023
- Full name: Samuela Newa Vunisa
- Born: 19 August 1988 (age 38) Suva, Fiji
- Height: 187 cm (6 ft 2 in)
- Weight: 110 kg (243 lb; 17 st 5 lb)
- School: Wanganui Collegiate School

Rugby union career
- Position(s): Number 8, Flanker
- Current team: Rangers Vicenza
Senior career
Years	Team	Apps	(Points)
2007	Wanganui	1	(0)
2009–2011	Taranaki	28	(25)
2011–2013	Calvisano	48	(95)
2013–2015	Zebre	44	(45)
2015–2017	Saracens	13	(30)
2017−2018	Glasgow Warriors	5	(5)
2018–2023	Calvisano	77	(190)
2023–2024	Petrarca Padova	19	(15)
2024–	Rangers Vicenza		
- Correct as of 14 May 2022
International career
Years	Team	Apps	(Points)
2007	Fiji U19	5	(10)
2008	Fiji U20	4	(5)
2014–2015	Italy	11	(0)
- Correct as of 23 May 2020

Samuela Vunisa (born 19 August 1988) is a Fijian-born Italian professional rugby union player who currently plays for Italian Serie A Elite team Rangers Vicenza. Powerful and athletic, Vunisa is an option across the back-row due to the combination of his speed, ball-carrying ability, physical strength and ability at the breakdown.

== Rugby Union career ==
=== Amateur career ===
His career began in 2009, where he played for New Zealand side Taranaki in the first tier domestic competition in the country, the ITM Cup.

He went on loan in the 2011-12 rugby season to Rugby Calvisano in Italy, and impressed as his team won the top level domestic league and the Excellence Trophy.

In the Summer of 2012, he returned to Taranaki. However, after negotiations lasting several weeks, the coach of Rugby Calvisano, Andrea Cavinato, announced in an interview with newspaper Giornale di Brescia in July 2012 of having reached an agreement for the termination of Vunisa's contract with Taranaki, allowing him to return to Calvisano for the 2012–13 season.

Vunisa has been drafted to Marr in the Scottish Premiership for the 2017–18 season.

Vunisa signed back with Rugby Calvisano for season 2018–19. He played with Calvisano until 2022−2023 season. In 2023–24 season, he played with Petrarca Padova.

=== Professional career ===
In the summer of 2013, he was signed by Zebre, one of the two professional Italian clubs. Zebre played in the Pro12, a multi-national league.

He later signed for Saracens in the Aviva Premiership in England.

On 26 May 2017, it was announced that Vunisa would sign for the Glasgow Warriors. He signed a two-year deal until 2019. He made 5 appearances for the Warriors scoring one try. He left the club at the end of the 2017–18 season.

=== International career ===
He played underage rugby for both the Fijian National Under-19 and Under-20 teams.

He qualified for the Italy national rugby union team in Autumn 2014 under the IRB 3-year residency rule, and was called up into the squad for the 2014 Autumn Rugby Internationals, winning his first cap on 22 November 2014 against South Africa national rugby union team. Italy national rugby union team were in contention for most of the game but conceded two late tries to lose 22–6.
