= Casilio =

Casilio is an Italian surname. Notable people with the surname include:

- Maria Pia Casilio (1935–2012), Italian actress
- Nicolò Casilio (born 1998), Italian rugby union player
