= 2009–10 Serie B (rugby union) =

In the 2009–10 season, the Serie B competition of rugby union in Italy consisted of four groups each of 12 teams, with a playoff for promotion among the top two teams from each group. The competition resulted in the promotion of four teams to Serie A2: Modena, Reggio Emilia, Roccia (Rubano) and Valpolicella.

== Results ==
=== Group A ===
==== Matchday 1 ====
Sunday, October 4, 2009
15:30
Rugby Varese	8 : 15	CUS Genova
Bassa Bresciana Leno	31 : 13	Rugby Parabiago
Biella Rugby Club	7 : 29	Rugby Sondrio Sertori
Rugby Grande Milano	25 : 12	Ospitaletto C.P. R.
Amatori R. Capoterra	33 : 5	Tutto Cialde Rugby Lecco
Rugby Alessandria	21 : 15	Patarò Rugby Lumezzane

==== Matchday 2 ====
Sunday, October 11, 2009
15:30
Rugby Sondrio Sertori	42 : 8	Rugby Varese
CUS Genova	30 : 0	Bassa Bresciana Leno
Rugby Parabiago	20 : 29	Biella Rugby Club
Tutto Cialde Rugby Lecco	10 : 27	Rugby Grande Milano
Ospitaletto C.P. R.	25 : 20	Rugby Alessandria
Patarò Rugby Lumezzane	12 : 28	Amatori R. Capoterra

==== Matchday 3 ====
Sunday, October 18, 2009
15:30
Rugby Varese	51 : 8	Ospitaletto C.P. R.
CUS Genova	29 : 5	Tutto Cialde Rugby Lecco
Bassa Bresciana Leno	5 : 6	Patarò Rugby Lumezzane
Biella Rugby Club	34 : 38	Amatori R. Capoterra
Rugby Grande Milano	39 : 10	Rugby Parabiago
Rugby Alessandria	8 : 24	Rugby Sondrio Sertori

==== Matchday 4 ====
Sunday, October 25, 2009
14:30
Tutto Cialde Rugby Lecco	35 : 29	Rugby Varese
Ospitaletto C.P. R.	13 : 20	CUS Genova
Amatori R. Capoterra	46 : 5	Bassa Bresciana Leno
Patarò Rugby Lumezzane	30 : 3	Biella Rugby Club
Rugby Parabiago	24 : 21	Rugby Alessandria
Rugby Sondrio Sertori	11 : 10	Rugby Grande Milano

==== Matchday 5 ====
Sunday, November 1, 2009
14:30
Rugby Varese	31 : 23	Rugby Parabiago
CUS Genova	15 : 11	Rugby Sondrio Sertori
Bassa Bresciana Leno	20 : 25	Biella Rugby Club
Rugby Grande Milano	34 : 25	Patarò Rugby Lumezzane
Rugby Alessandria	23 : 29	Amatori R. Capoterra
Tutto Cialde Rugby Lecco	35 : 15	Ospitaletto C.P. R.

==== Matchday 6 ====
Sunday, November 8, 2009
14:30
Amatori R. Capoterra	26 : 7	Rugby Varese
Patarò Rugby Lumezzane	7 : 55	CUS Genova
Bassa Bresciana Leno	32 : 19	Rugby Alessandria
Biella Rugby Club	6 : 42	Rugby Grande Milano
Rugby Parabiago	19 : 11	Ospitaletto C.P. R.
Rugby Sondrio Sertori	20 : 6	Tutto Cialde Rugby Lecco

==== Matchday 7 ====
Sunday, November 29, 2009
15:30
Rugby Varese	12 : 7	Bassa Bresciana Leno
CUS Genova	31 : 17	Rugby Parabiago
Rugby Alessandria	12 : 29	Biella Rugby Club
Rugby Grande Milano	39 : 3	Amatori R. Capoterra
Tutto Cialde Rugby Lecco	20 : 5	Patarò Rugby Lumezzane
Ospitaletto C.P. R.	8 : 20	Rugby Sondrio Sertori

==== Matchday 8 ====
Sunday, December 6, 2009
14:30
Patarò Rugby Lumezzane	16 : 22	Rugby Varese
Rugby Alessandria	7 : 22	CUS Genova
Bassa Bresciana Leno	0 : 66	Rugby Grande Milano
Biella Rugby Club	16 : 22	Ospitaletto C.P. R.
Rugby Parabiago	5 : 22	Tutto Cialde Rugby Lecco
Amatori R. Capoterra	27 : 34	Rugby Sondrio Sertori

==== Matchday 9 ====
Sunday, December 13, 2009
14:30
Rugby Varese	13 : 20	Biella Rugby Club
CUS Genova	38 : 15	Amatori R. Capoterra
Tutto Cialde Rugby Lecco	32 : 6	Bassa Bresciana Leno
Rugby Sondrio Sertori	52 : 14	Rugby Parabiago
Rugby Grande Milano	48 : 17	Rugby Alessandria
Ospitaletto C.P. R.	6 : 9	Patarò Rugby Lumezzane

==== Matchday 10 ====
Sunday, December 20, 2009
14:30
Rugby Alessandria	10 : 0	Rugby Varese
Rugby Grande Milano	21 : 19	CUS Genova
Bassa Bresciana Leno	20 : 22	Ospitaletto C.P. R.
Biella Rugby Club	6 : 3	Tutto Cialde Rugby Lecco
Amatori R. Capoterra	42 : 5	Rugby Parabiago
Patarò Rugby Lumezzane	10 : 15	Rugby Sondrio Sertori

==== Matchday 11 ====
Sunday, January 10, 2010
14:30
Rugby Varese	0 : 34	Rugby Grande Milano
CUS Genova	43 : 5	Biella Rugby Club
Rugby Sondrio Sertori	31 : 5	Bassa Bresciana Leno
Rugby Parabiago	10 : 23	Patarò Rugby Lumezzane
Tutto Cialde Rugby Lecco	25 : 12	Rugby Alessandria
Ospitaletto C.P. R.	9 : 14	Amatori R. Capoterra

==== Matchday 12 ====
Sunday, January 17, 2010
14:30
CUS Genova	32 : 11	Rugby Varese
Rugby Parabiago	15 : 26	Bassa Bresciana Leno
Rugby Sondrio Sertori	21 : 5	Biella Rugby Club
Ospitaletto C.P. R.	19 : 36	Rugby Grande Milano
Tutto Cialde Rugby Lecco	51 : 3	Amatori R. Capoterra
Patarò Rugby Lumezzane	58 : 0	Rugby Alessandria

==== Matchday 13 ====
Sunday, January 24, 2010
14:30
Rugby Varese	19 : 33	Rugby Sondrio Sertori
Bassa Bresciana Leno	11 : 31	CUS Genova
Biella Rugby Club	40 : 7	Rugby Parabiago
Rugby Grande Milano	48 : 19	Tutto Cialde Rugby Lecco
Rugby Alessandria	22 : 3	Ospitaletto C.P. R.
Amatori R. Capoterra	29 : 14	Patarò Rugby Lumezzane

==== Matchday 14 ====
Sunday, January 31, 2010
14:30
Ospitaletto C.P. R.	19 : 7	Rugby Varese
Tutto Cialde Rugby Lecco	5 : 20	CUS Genova
Patarò Rugby Lumezzane	19 : 13	Bassa Bresciana Leno
Amatori R. Capoterra	17 : 20	Biella Rugby Club
Rugby Parabiago	10 : 55	Rugby Grande Milano
Rugby Sondrio Sertori	36 : 17	Rugby Alessandria

==== Matchday 15 ====
Sunday, February 21, 2010
14:30
Rugby Varese	5 : 38	Tutto Cialde Rugby Lecco
CUS Genova	92 : 0	Ospitaletto C.P. R.
Bassa Bresciana Leno	26 : 45	Amatori R. Capoterra
Biella Rugby Club	22 : 15	Patarò Rugby Lumezzane
Rugby Alessandria	26 : 25	Rugby Parabiago
Rugby Grande Milano	32 : 12	Rugby Sondrio Sertori

==== Matchday 16 ====
Sunday, March 7, 2010
14:30
Rugby Parabiago	19 : 8	Rugby Varese
Rugby Sondrio Sertori	19 : 20	CUS Genova
Biella Rugby Club	22 : 19	Bassa Bresciana Leno
Patarò Rugby Lumezzane	8 : 17	Rugby Grande Milano
Amatori R. Capoterra	27 : 5	Rugby Alessandria
Ospitaletto C.P. R.	7 : 8	Tutto Cialde Rugby Lecco

==== Matchday 17 ====
Not Terminated
Ospitaletto C.P. R.	30 : 25	Rugby Parabiago
Sunday, March 28, 2010
15:30
Rugby Varese	33 : 26	Amatori R. Capoterra
CUS Genova	: -	Patarò Rugby Lumezzane
Rugby Alessandria	29 : 12	Bassa Bresciana Leno
Rugby Grande Milano	43 : 15	Biella Rugby Club
Tutto Cialde Rugby Lecco	20 : 10	Rugby Sondrio Sertori

==== Matchday 18 ====
Sunday, 11 April 2010
15:30
Bassa Bresciana Leno	19 : 30	Rugby Varese
Rugby Parabiago	21 : 27	CUS Genova
Biella Rugby Club	10 : 10	Rugby Alessandria
Amatori R. Capoterra	21 : 29	Rugby Grande Milano
Patarò Rugby Lumezzane	20 : 22	Tutto Cialde Rugby Lecco
Rugby Sondrio Sertori	26 : 22	Ospitaletto C.P. R.

==== Matchday 19 ====
Sunday, 18 April 2010
15:30
Rugby Varese	17 : 12	Patarò Rugby Lumezzane
CUS Genova	35 : 16	Rugby Alessandria
Rugby Grande Milano	55 : 5	Bassa Bresciana Leno
Ospitaletto C.P. R.	10 : 3	Biella Rugby Club
Tutto Cialde Rugby Lecco	52 : 10	Rugby Parabiago
Rugby Sondrio Sertori	: -	Amatori R. Capoterra

==== Matchday 20 ====
Sunday, 25 April 2010
15:30
Biella Rugby Club	33 : 14	Rugby Varese
Amatori R. Capoterra	15 : 13	CUS Genova
Bassa Bresciana Leno	22 : 31	Tutto Cialde Rugby Lecco
Rugby Parabiago	17 : 31	Rugby Sondrio Sertori
Rugby Alessandria	3 : 58	Rugby Grande Milano
Patarò Rugby Lumezzane	8 : 16	Ospitaletto C.P. R.

==== Matchday 21 ====
Sunday, May 2, 2010
15:30
Rugby Varese	11 : 20	Rugby Alessandria
CUS Genova	19 : 15	Rugby Grande Milano
Ospitaletto C.P. R.	6 : 17	Bassa Bresciana Leno
Tutto Cialde Rugby Lecco	22 : 10	Biella Rugby Club
Rugby Parabiago	7 : 37	Amatori R. Capoterra
Rugby Sondrio Sertori	27 : 13	Patarò Rugby Lumezzane

==== Matchday 22 ====
Sunday, May 9, 2010
15:30
Rugby Grande Milano	22 : 5	Rugby Varese
Biella Rugby Club	13 : 21	CUS Genova
Bassa Bresciana Leno	26 : 17	Rugby Sondrio Sertori
Patarò Rugby Lumezzane	27 : 25	Rugby Parabiago
Rugby Alessandria	17 : 34	Tutto Cialde Rugby Lecco
Amatori R. Capoterra	48 : 8	Ospitaletto C.P. R.
