= Michael van Vuren =

Italy international rugby union player

- Born: 3 April 1990 (age 36) East London, South Africa
- Height: 1.98 m (6 ft 6 in)
- Weight: 106 kg (16 st 10 lb; 234 lb)

Rugby union career
- Position: Lock / Number eight
- Current team: Colorno
Senior career
Years	Team	Apps	(Points)
2011–2012	Crociati RFC	15	(10)
2012–2014	Zebre	30	(0)
2014–2017	Mogliano	51	(15)
2017	→ Benetton	1	(0)
2017–2018	San Donà	18	(5)
2018−2023	Calvisano	101	(15)
2023−	Colorno		
- Correct as of 14 May 2022
International career
Years	Team	Apps	(Points)
2012	Emerging Italy	5	(0)
- Correct as of 2 June 2018

Michael van Vuren (born 3 April 1990) is an Italian rugby union player, currently playing with Italian side Colorno, currently competing in Italian Serie A Elite based in Colorno (Province of Parma), in Emilia Romagna. Van Vuren, who is a Lock or Number eight played for Zebre in the Pro12 of the rugby union competition originally known as the Celtic League.

== Career ==
Although born in East London, Eastern Cape, South Africa, Van Vuren is eligible to play for the Italy national rugby union team on residency grounds. He made his debut for the Emerging Italy team on 8 June 2012 in the 2012 IRB Nations Cup against Russia.

=== Zebre Pro12 ===
Van Vuren, who is a Lock or Number eight played rugby for Zebre in 2012/2013 and 2013/2014. He played 22 matches in the Pro12 and 9 in the Heineken cup.

=== Rugby Mogliano ===
Van Vuren played 50 games for Mogliano, scoring 3 tries, playing Lock.

=== Rugby San Donà ===
Van Vuren signed with Rugby San Donà di Piave, in the metropolitan city of Venice to join San Donà the National Championship of Excellence side. He played 18 games, starting 17.

Lafert San Donà wins the Final of the Excellence Trophy for 24 to 0, signing a historical result in the record of the Rugby San Donà club and the first Trofeo won by South African trainer Zane Ansell against Fiamme Oro Rugby.

=== Rugby Calvisano ===
Van Vuren signed with Rugby Calvisano, which is based in Calvisano (Province of Brescia), in Lombardy, as Lock or Number eight. He played with Calvisano until the 2022−23 season.
