= Leso =

Leso may refer to:

== People ==
- John Leso (born 1966), American psychologist and army officer
- Miroljub Lešo (1946–2019), Yugoslav and Serbian actor
- Piermaria Leso (born 1991), Italian rugby union player

== Places ==
- Leso, Indonesia
- Léso, Congo
- San Sebastián Airport (ICAO:LESO), Spain

== Other ==
- Law Enforcement Support Office
- East African textiles also known as kangas
