= Luhandre Luus =

South African rugby union player

- Born: 13 November 1995 (age 31) Cape Town, South Africa
- Height: 1.86 m (6 ft 1 in)
- Weight: 110 kg (17 st 5 lb; 243 lb)

Rugby union career
- Position: Hooker
- Current team: Petrarca Padova
Youth career
- Sharks
Senior career
| Years | Team | Apps | (Points) |
| 2014−2015 | F.I.R. Academy | | |
| 2015−2017 | Calvisano | 25 | (25) |
| 2017−2019 | Zebre | 33 | (5) |
| 2019−2023 | Valorugby Emilia | 65 | (165) |
| 2023− | Petrarca Padova | | |
- Correct as of 24 May 2020
International career
| Years | Team | Apps | (Points) |
| 2015 | Italy Under 20 | 10 | (15) |
| 2016−2018 | Emerging Italy | 6 | (0) |
- Correct as of 24 May 2020

Luhandre Luus (born 13 November 1995 in Cape Town) is a South African-born Italian rugby union player. His usual position is as a Hooker and he currently plays Petrarca Padova in Italian Serie A Elite.

In 2017–18 Pro14 and 2018–19 Pro14 seasons, he played for Zebre in Pro 14, first to pass to Valorugby Emilia in Top12, where he played for it until 2023.

After playing for Italy Under 20 in 2015, in 2016 and 2018 he also was named in the Emerging Italy squad.
