= Hugo Torres =

Argentina international rugby union player

- Born: April 24, 1962 (age 64) Buenos Aires, Argentina

Rugby union career
- Position: Prop
Senior career
Years	Team	Apps	(Points)
1979-1987	Tala Rugby Club		
1987-1988	CUS Roma		
1988-1995	Rugby Roma		
1995-1998	CUS Roma	111	
1998-2001	Capitolina		
2001-2003	Castel San Pietro		
International career
Years	Team	Apps	(Points)
1987	Argentina	0	(0)
Coaching career
- Years: Team
- 1995-1998: CUS Roma
- 1998-2001: Capitolina
- 2001-2003: Castel San Pietro

Hugo Torres (born Córdoba, 24 April 1962) is a former Argentinian rugby union player and coach.

== Career ==
Torres started his career in 1979, playing for his hometown club, Tala Rugby Club until 1987, when he moved to Italy playing for CUS Roma Rugby in the 1987-88 season, then for Rugby Roma Olimpic between 1988 and 1995. From 1995, he returned to CUS Roma Rugby, where he started as player-coach, between 1998 and 2001 he moved to Unione Rugby Capitolina and then, for Castel San Pietro, being player-coach in both clubs. Torres retired in the 2003 season. Torres was called in the Argentina national rugby union team during the 1987 Rugby World Cup, but never saw action.
