= CUS Roma Rugby =

Italian rugby union club, based in Rome

(Italy) CUS Roma Rugby
- Union: FIR
- Founded: 1947; 79 years ago
- Ground(s): Centro universitario sportivo, Rome (Capacity: ~2000)
1st kit	2nd kit

Official website
- www.cusromarugby.com

CUS Roma Rugby is the rugby union section of Centro Universitario Sportivo di Roma, founded in 1947. During its history, the team took part in several national first division championships and won the Coppa Italia during the 1966–67 season.

Due to financial problems, the union rejected the application of the university team to the 2016–17 Serie B season and the team is at risk of disappearing. In CUS Roma for that season it only remains the under-18 team which took part in the regional championship where it reached the second place.

== History ==
The CUS Roma Rugby is born officially in 1947 as the rugby union section of the Centro Universitario Sportivo di Roma, which collects the legacy of the university sports group of the fascist era. Under the name GUF Roma, the team took part in serie A from 1934/35 to 1942/43, last championship played before the suspension due to the bellic events.

In 1950–51 CUS Roma is the first university club in the post-war to return in the top division. It was a short-lived experience, terminated with the relegation in serie B. In 1956–57 the team takes part again in Serie A, where they manage to resist for three consecutive seasons.

The first golden age for CUS Roma opens in 1962–63 with the return in the top division. The university club was suddenly projected to the top of the Italian rugby union. In 1964–65 and in 1965–66 CUS was in the second place for two consecutive times behind the eventual Italian champions, Partenope.

In 1966–67 the team reaches the third place, behind L'Aquila and the eventual champions, Fiamme Oro Padova. In the same season, in a historic final, CUS Roma beats CUS Torino 15–3 and wins the first edition of Coppa Italia.

The magical era stopped abruptly the following year, when CUS experienced one of the several splits that devastated its history. The entire team passed in block to Buscaglione Roma, a newly formed team which acquired CUS' sports tile and the right to take part in the top division. The university club had to start over. The team would not return to Serie A until the summer of 1974, with the victory against CUS Napoli in the decisive play-off which was played inL'Aquila, even if the permanence in the top division that time lasted the timespan of one season.

The club's importance at domestic level is witnessed also by the election of Sergio Luzzi-Conti, former head of the rugby union section and then CUS Roma president, to the office of president of Federazione Italiana Rugby, which he maintained from 1971 to 1974. In 1973 Luzzi-Conti was the inspirator of Italy first tour in South Africa, which marked an important breakthrough for the Italian rugby union.

The second CUS Roma Rugby's golden age was in the 1980s, with Alberto Gualtieri as chairman. The university club returns in Serie A for a season in 1982–83, but it was not until 1986–87 where the journey of a generation of new talents started. In four consecutive seasons the team takes parte to the Serie A1, new name assumed by the top division. In those years the championship registered the presence of the most important international players, who joined from the major Italian clubs. In the historic Acqua Acetosa field, CUS faced several rugby stars such as David Campese, John Kirwan and Naas Botha.

Many CUS players in those years were called up in the national team, including Tinari, Pratichetti, Caranci, Salvati, De Biase, Ambrosio, to cite a few names. The player that was a symbol of that generation was Stefano Barba, centre with outstanding attack abilities who took part at the 1987 Rugby World Cup and collected more than 30 caps for Italy.

In the same years the youth sector was submitted to a development, which reached the top levels of the domestic scene, as demonstrated in the several finals reached in the various categories and the title of Italian Champion won by the under-17 squad in 1983.84 (under the name CUS Roma) and in 1985/86 (under the name Primavera Roma). However, a breakaway group of executives and coaches of the youth teams in the late 1980s founded an autonomous team, U.S. Primavera, where the youth sector growth is still one of the club's main goals.

In the early 1990s the university sports facilities in Tor di Quinto was inaugurated, where it stands "the biggest rugby field in Italy". CUS Roma finally had an own playing field. It could be the chance for a further step forward, but the rising financial restraints and a series of team vicissitudes marked the start of an era of gradual resizing of the CUS' ambitions.

The first team, relegated in Serie A2 in 1989–90, dispute again a competition in the top division in 1993–94. In the following season the team plays in Serie A2 and is relegated to Serie B to later return in Serie A2 in 1995–96. That season was the last appearance in Serie A. Another split from a group of players and coaches gave birth to Unione Rugby Capitolina, weakening the CUS' organic in all the categories. From 1996 to 1997, CUS Roma Rugby plays in Serie B competition.

In the last two seasons, the entire CUS Roma team underwent a renovation, which brought to the election Gianfranco Morrone as chairman. The renovation affected also the rugby section: the new section Board, made up entirely of active players, is working hard to bring back the university rugby team of the capital to its level. At the end of the 2014–15 season, CUS Roma achieved the promotion to Serie A after 19 seasons played in Serie B (see La storia del CUS on cusromarugby.com). The 2015–2016 season was not as lucky for the team, which did not manage to remain in the top division, thus being relegated to Serie B.

== Honours ==
- Coppa Italia
  1966–67
- Reserves national championships: 3
  1938–39 (as GUF Roma), 1960–61, 1978–79
- Under-17 national championship: 2
  1983–84, 1985–86 (as Primavera Roma)

== Notable players ==
- (Italy) Claudio Tinari
- (Italy) Carlo Pratichetti
- (Italy) Alessandro Caranci
- (Italy) Andrea Lioj
- (Italy) Gianluca Limone
- (Italy) Andrea Angrisani
- (Italy) Maurizio Bocconcelli
- (Italy) Ivo Mazzucchelli
- (Italy) Luigi Salvati
- (Italy) Carlo De Biase
- (Italy) Rodolfo Ambrosio
- (Italy) Stefano Barba
- (Italy) Giulio Toniolatti
- (Argentina) Leandro Lobrauco
- (Argentina) Hugo Torres

=== Notable international women's players ===
- (Italy) Michela Tondinelli
- (Italy) Daniela Gini
- (Italy) Sara Pettinelli

== See also ==
- Federazione Italiana Rugby
- Serie A (rugby union)
- CUS Roma

== Sources ==
- Francesco Volpe; Francesco Volpe; Paolo Pacitti (2008). ZESI (ed.). Rugby 2009. Rome, Italy.
