= Franco Lamanna =

Uruguayan rugby union footballer

- Born: October 5, 1991 (age 35) Montevideo, Uruguay
- Height: 6 ft 2 in (1.88 m)
- Weight: 100 kg (15 st 10 lb; 220 lb)

Rugby union career
- Position(s): Lock, Flanker
Amateur team(s)
| Years | Team | Apps | (Points) |
| 2010−2014 | Carrasco Polo Club | | |
| 2014−2015 | CUS Perugia | | |
| 2015 | Carrasco Polo Club | | |
| 2016 | CUS Perugia | | |
| 2016−2017 | Pro Recco | | |
| 2017−2019 | SC Mazamet | | |
| 2019−2020 | Darlington Mowden Park | | |
| 2020 | Sesto | | |
Senior career
| Years | Team | Apps | (Points) |
| 2020−2023 | Mogliano | 40 | (25) |
International career
| Years | Team | Apps | (Points) |
| 2011 | Uruguay Under 20 | 4 | (5) |
| 2012-Present | Uruguay | 44 | (35) |
- Correct as of 16 March 2018

Franco Lamanna (born 5 October 1991 in Montevideo) is a Uruguayan rugby union player. He currently plays as a flanker and lock for Mogliano in Top12.

Lamanna started playing rugby in his local team Carrasco Polo Club in Uruguay.

In mid 2014, he went to Europe to play for CUS Perugia Rugby in the Italian Serie A.

In October 2014, during the game against the National Academy Ivan Francescato, he ruptured his left anterior cruciate ligament and had to be operated urgently. He recovered successfully from the injury and returned to his country to play again for Carrasco Polo Club. In 2015 he takes part of the Uruguayan National team at the RWC2015 and then in January 2016 he returns to play one season for CUS Perugia Rugby. Then continues his career at Pro Recco Rugby also in Italy till May 2017. For the season 2017-2018 he plays for the SC Mazamet in France.

In November 2019, he was signed by Darlington Mowden Park R.F.C. to play in England's National League 1. In July 2020 he come back in Italy to play for Mogliano in Top12, where he played until 2023.

== International career ==
He has 44 caps for Uruguay since 2012.
