= Antoine Koffi =

- Full name: Antoine Kouassi Koffi
- Born: 15 January 1999 (age 27) Parma, Italy
- Height: 1.85 m (6 ft 1 in)
- Weight: 100 kg (220 lb; 15 st 10 lb)

Rugby union career
- Position: Flanker
- Current team: Colorno
Youth career
- Amatori Parma
Senior career
Years	Team	Apps	(Points)
2017−2018	F.I.R. Academy		
2018−2021	Calvisano	39	(35)
2018−2020	→Zebre	6	(0)
2021−	Colorno	15	(35)
- Correct as of 23 Apr 2022
International career
Years	Team	Apps	(Points)
2018−2019	Italy Under 20	16	(5)
- Correct as of 26 May 2020

Antoine Kouassi Koffi (born 15 January 1999 in Parma) is an Italian rugby union player. His usual position is as a Flanker and he currently plays for Colorno in Top10.

In 2018–19 Pro14 and 2020–21 Pro14 seasons, he was named as Additional Player for Zebre.

In 2018 and 2019, Koffi was named in the Italy Under 20 squad.

Since 2023 he has taken part in the Milanese rugby 7s selection “Natiscombinati” in major Italian and European club tournaments.
