= Serie A (rugby union) =

Second tier of Italy's men's rugby union championship

- Current season, competition or edition: Serie A 2025–26
- Sport: Rugby union
- Founded: 1932; 94 years ago
- No. of teams: 30
- Country: Italy
- Most recent champion: Biella (2024–25)
- Promotion to: Serie A Elite
- Relegation to: Serie B
- Website: www.federugby.it

Serie A is the second tier of the Italian Rugby Union championship. Until the creation of the Super 10 (now Serie A Elite) in a 2002 restructuring exercise, it was the top tier.

Serie A is composed of 4 leagues of 6 teams. During the season, which runs from September to May, each team plays each other team in the same league at home and away. At the completion of this phase of competition, the top 2 teams from each league play off in semi-finals and a final to determine the champions who are then promoted to the Eccellenza competition for the following season.

== Past winners ==
| Season | (gold) Champion | Score | (silver) Runner-up |
|---|---|---|---|
| 1986-87 | Lyons | round robin | San Donà |
| 1987-88 | Calvisano | round robin | Noceto |
| 1988-89 | Amatori Catania | round robin | Parma |
| 1989-90 | Tarvisium | round robin | Noceto |
| 1990-91 | Rugby Roma | round robin | Lyons |
| 1991-92 | Casale | round robin | Calvisano |
| 1992-93 | Tarvisium | round robin | CUS Roma |
| 1993-94 | Bologna | 42–28 (Agg.) | Paese |
| 1994-95 | Piacenza | 32–26 | Livorno |
| 1995-96 | Bologna | N/A | Colleferro |
| 1996-97 | Fiamme Oro | round robin | Piacenza |
| 1997-98 | CUS Padova | N/A | Parma |
| 1998-99 | Bologna | round robin | Viadana |
| 1999-00 | Gran Parma | round robin | Livorno |
| 2000-01 | Bologna | round robin | Mirano |
| 2001-02 | Silea | round robin | Piacenza |
| 2002-03 | Leonessa | round robin | Piacenza |
| 2003-04 | Amatori Catania | Playoffs | Piacenza |
| 2004-05 | Venezia Mestre | 44–8 | Capitolina |
| 2005-06 | Capitolina | 20–9 | Rugby Roma |
| 2006-07 | Venezia Mestre | 13–10 | Cavalieri |
| 2007-08 | Rugby Roma | 24–10 | L'Aquila |
| 2008-09 | Cavalieri | 25–18 | L'Aquila |
| 2009-10 | Lazio | 43–6 | Noceto |
| 2010-11 | Calvisano | 19–0 | Firenze |
| 2011-12 | San Donà | 13–9 | Fiamme Oro |
| 2012-13 | Capitolina | 29–16 | Pro Recco |
| 2013-14 | L'Aquila | 28–18 | Lyons |
| 2014-15 | Lyons | 26–19 | Pro Recco |
| 2015-16 | Reggio Emilia | 33–5 | Pro Recco |
| 2016-17 | Medicei | 38–14 | L'Aquila |
| 2017-18 | Verona | 20–14 | Valsugana |
| 2018-19 | Lyons | 29–17 | Colorno |
| 2019-20 | Canceled | | |
| 2020-21 | Not disputed | | |
| 2021-22 | CUS Torino | 29–25 | Capitolina |
| 2022-23 | Rangers Vicenza | 21–18 | Lazio |
| 2023-24 | Lazio | 26–23 | CUS Torino |
| 2024-25 | Biella | 19–17 | Parabiago |
| 2025-26 | Parabiago | 21-17 | CUS Torino |

== Publications ==
- (in Italian) Francesco Volpe and Paolo Pacetti, Rugby 2023 (Zesi, 2022).
