= Nicolò Casilio =

Italian rugby union player (born 1998)

- Born: 12 October 1998 (age 28) L'Aquila, Italy
- Height: 1.81 m (5 ft 11 in)
- Weight: 84 kg (13 st 3 lb; 185 lb)

Rugby union career
- Position: Scrum-Half
- Current team: Valorugby Emilia
Youth career
- L'Aquila
Senior career
Years	Team	Apps	(Points)
2016−2017	F.I.R. Academy	8	(0)
2017−2020	Calvisano	45	(41)
2019−2020	→Zebre	4	(0)
2020−2023	Zebre Parma	28	(5)
2023	Colorno	5	(10)
2023−2025	Benetton	4	(0)
2025−	Valorugby Emilia		
- Correct as of 25 Jul 2025
International career
Years	Team	Apps	(Points)
2018	Italy Under 20	4	(0)
2021−	Italy A	3	(5)
2026	Italy XV	1	(0)
- Correct as of 24 Jun 2022

Nicolò Casilio (L'Aquila, 12 October 1998) is an Italian rugby union player. His usual position is as a Scrum-Half and he currently plays for Valorugby Emilia in Serie A Elite.

Under contract with Top10 team Calvisano, for 2019–20 Pro14 season, he was a Permit Player for Zebre in Pro 14. He played for Zebre Parma in United Rugby Championship from 2020 to March 2023. After, he signed until the end of the 2022−2023 for Colorno in Top10 in order to participate at play off. Casilio signed for Benetton in June 2023. He made his debut in Round 2 of EPCR Challenge Cup in the 2023–24 season against the Perpignan. He played with Benetton in the United Rugby Championship until 2025.

In July 2025, he signed with Valorugby Emilia in Serie A Elite.

In 2018, Casilio was named in the Italy Under 20 squad. On 14 October 2021, he was selected by Alessandro Troncon to be part of an Italy A 28-man squad for the 2021 end-of-year rugby union internationals. On 27 February 2026 he was selected by Massimo Brunello to be part of an Italy XV squad for two official test against Chile during 2026 men's rugby union internationals window of spring.
