= Massimo Ceciliani =

- Born: 5 January 1997 (age 29) Sondrio, Italy
- Height: 1.86 m (6 ft 1 in)
- Weight: 104 kg (16 st 5 lb; 229 lb)

Rugby union career
- Position: Hooker
- Current team: Parabiago
Youth career
- US Delebio Rugby
- –: Rugby Grande Milano
Senior career
Years	Team	Apps	(Points)
2015−2017	F.I.R. Academy		
2017−2018	Viadana	16	(5)
2018−2022	Zebre	51	(0)
2022−2023	Calvisano	18	(10)
2023−	Rugby Parabiago		
- Correct as of 21 May 2022
International career
Years	Team	Apps	(Points)
2017	Italy Under 20	8	(5)
- Correct as of 17 May 2020

Massimo Ceciliani (Sondrio, 5 January 1997) is an Italian rugby union player. His usual position is as a Hooker and he plays for Parabiago in Serie A.

He played for Zebre from 2018 to 2022. For 2022−23 he came back in Top10 in order to play for Calvisano.

In 2017, Ceciliani was named in the Italy Under-20 squad.

his mother is called Antonella and his father Marco.
