= Federico Consoli =

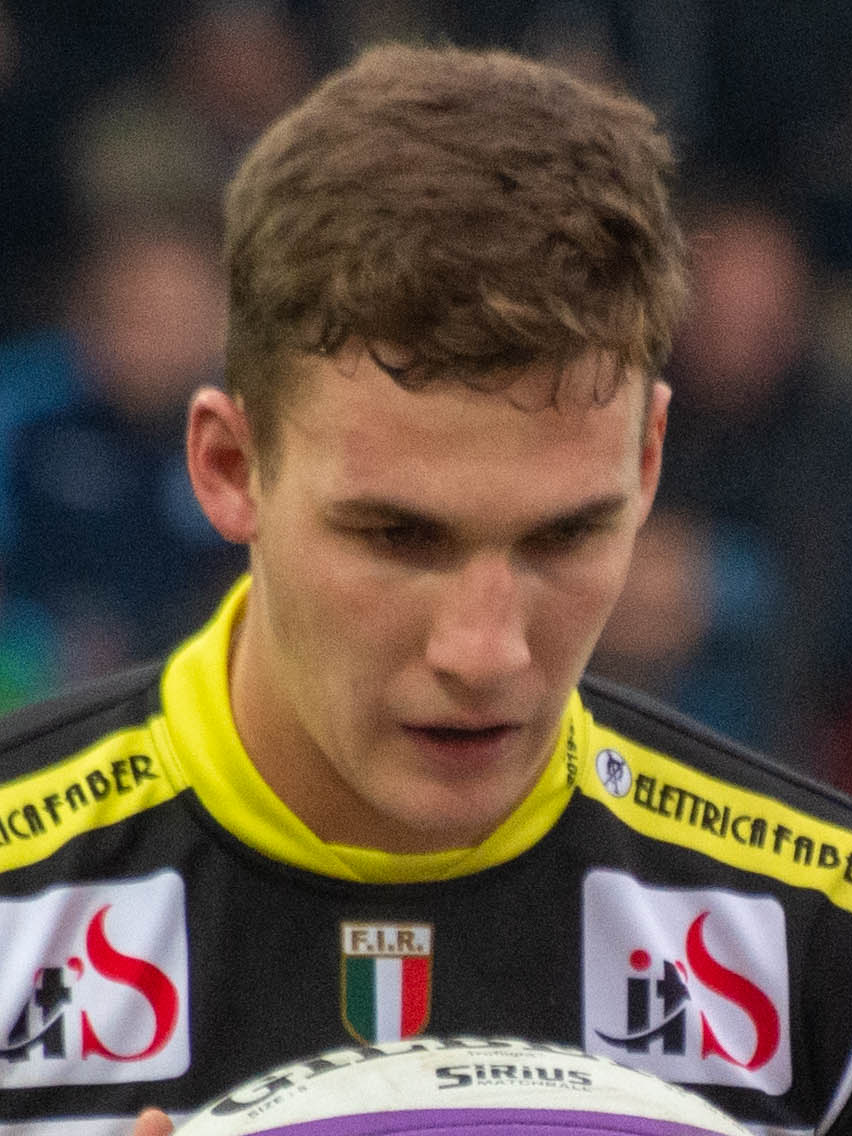
- Born: 31 October 1998 (age 28) Brescia, Italy
- Height: 1.85 m (6 ft 1 in)
- Weight: 85 kg (13 st 5 lb; 187 lb)

Rugby union career
- Position: Scrum half
- Current team: Calvisano
Youth career
- Calvisano
Senior career
Years	Team	Apps	(Points)
2016–	Calvisano		
- Correct as of 8 November 2020
- Correct as of 8 November 2020

Federico Consoli (born 31 October 1998 in Brescia) is an Italian rugby union player. His usual position is as a Scrum half and he currently plays for Calvisano in Top12.
