= Riccardo Brugnara =

Italian rugby union player (born 1993)

- Born: 26 December 1993 (age 32) Mantua, Italy
- Height: 180 cm (71 in)
- Weight: 115 kg (254 lb)

Rugby union career
- Position: Prop
- Current team: Valorugby Emilia
Youth career
- 2006−2010: Rugby Mantova
- 2010−2011: Viadana
- 2011−2013: Leicester Tigers
Amateur team(s)
| Years | Team | Apps | (Points) |
| 2006-2010 | Mantova | | |
| 2010-2011 | Viadana | | |
Senior career
| Years | Team | Apps | (Points) |
| 2013–17 | Leicester Tigers | 15 | (0) |
| 2013–16 | →Doncaster Knights | 22 | (5) |
| 2015–17 | →Loghborough Students | 32 | (10) |
| 2017−19 | Rovigo Delta | 37 | (10) |
| 2018 | →Benetton | 2 | (0) |
| 2019−2023 | Calvisano | 73 | (0) |
| 2020 | →Zebre | 5 | (0) |
| 2023−2025 | Petrarca Padova | 31 | (5) |
| 2025− | Valorugby Emilia | | |
- Correct as of 14 May 2022
International career
| Years | Team | Apps | (Points) |
| 2016−18 | Emerging Italy | 4 | (0) |

Riccardo Brugnara (born 26 December 1993 in Mantua, Lombardy) is an Italian prop who plays for Valorugby Emilia in the Italian Serie A Elite, previously he played for Leicester Tigers in the Premiership and has played on loan for Doncaster in the Championship.

Brugnara joined Tigers' Academy after attending a rugby course run by Bob Dwyer in his native Italy.

Under contract with Rovigo Delta, in 2018 he was named Additional Player for Benetton Rugby. Signed with Calvisano, for 2019–20 Pro14 and 2020–21 Pro14 seasons he also named as Permit Player for Zebre. He played with Calvisano until 2022−2023 season. From 2023 to 2025 he played for Petrarca Padova in the Italian Serie A Elite.

In 2016 and 2018 Brugnara was named in the Emerging Italy squad for the World Rugby Nations Cup.

== See also ==
- Riccardo Brugnara's Stats in Premiership on premiershiprugby.com, Premier Rugby Ltd.
- Leicester Tigers deals after the club's development group on bbc.com/sport
- It's Rugby France Profile
