= Angelo Maurizi =

- Born: 19 December 2000 (age 25) L'Aquila, Italy
- Height: 1.91 m (6 ft 3 in)
- Weight: 105 kg (16 st 7 lb; 231 lb)

Rugby union career
- Position: Flanker
- Current team: Calvisano
Youth career
- L'Aquila
Senior career
Years	Team	Apps	(Points)
2018–2020	F.I.R. Academy		
2019–2020	→Calvisano	2	(0)
2020–	Calvisano		
- Correct as of 8 November 2020
International career
Years	Team	Apps	(Points)
2019–2020	Italy Under 20	5	(0)
- Correct as of 8 November 2020

Angelo Maurizi (L'Aquila, 19 December 2000) is an Italian rugby union player. His usual position is as a Flanker and he currently plays for Calvisano in Top12.

He also represented Calvisano in the 2019–20 European Rugby Challenge Cup as Additional Player.

In 2019 and 2020, Maurizi was named in the Italy Under 20 squad.
