= Michele Regonaschi =

Italian rugby union player

- Born: 21 January 2000 (age 26) Brescia, Italy
- Height: 1.85 m (6 ft 1 in)
- Weight: 98 kg (15 st 6 lb; 216 lb)

Rugby union career
- Position: Wing
- Current team: Calvisano
Youth career
- Calvisano
- –: F.I.R. Academy
Senior career
Years	Team	Apps	(Points)
2019−2022	Calvisano	12	(5)
- Correct as of 8 November 2020
- Correct as of 8 November 2020

Michele Regonaschi (Brescia, 21 January 2000) is an Italian rugby union player. His usual position is as a Wing. He plays for Calvisano in Top12 since 2019.
