= Davide Zanetti =

Italian rugby union player

- Born: 14 March 1995 (age 31) Gardone Val Trompia, Italy
- Height: 1.93 m (6 ft 4 in)
- Weight: 110 kg (243 lb; 17 st 5 lb)

Rugby union career
- Position: Lock
- Current team: Calvisano
Youth career
- 2010−2011: Fiumicello
- 2011−2013: Calvisano
Senior career
Years	Team	Apps	(Points)
2013−2015	F.I.R. Academy		
2015−	Calvisano	80	(20)
2017	→Zebre	1	(0)
- Correct as of 24 Apr 2022
International career
Years	Team	Apps	(Points)
2014−2015	Italy Under 20	12	(5)
- Correct as of 7 June 2020

Davide Zanetti (born 14 March 1995 in Gardone Val Trompia) is an Italian rugby union player. His usual position is as a Lock and he currently plays for Calvisano in Top12.

For 2016–17 Pro12 season, Zanetti was named as Additional Player for Zebre.

In 2014 and 2015, he was also named in the Italy Under 20.
