= Julien Delannoy =

French rugby union player

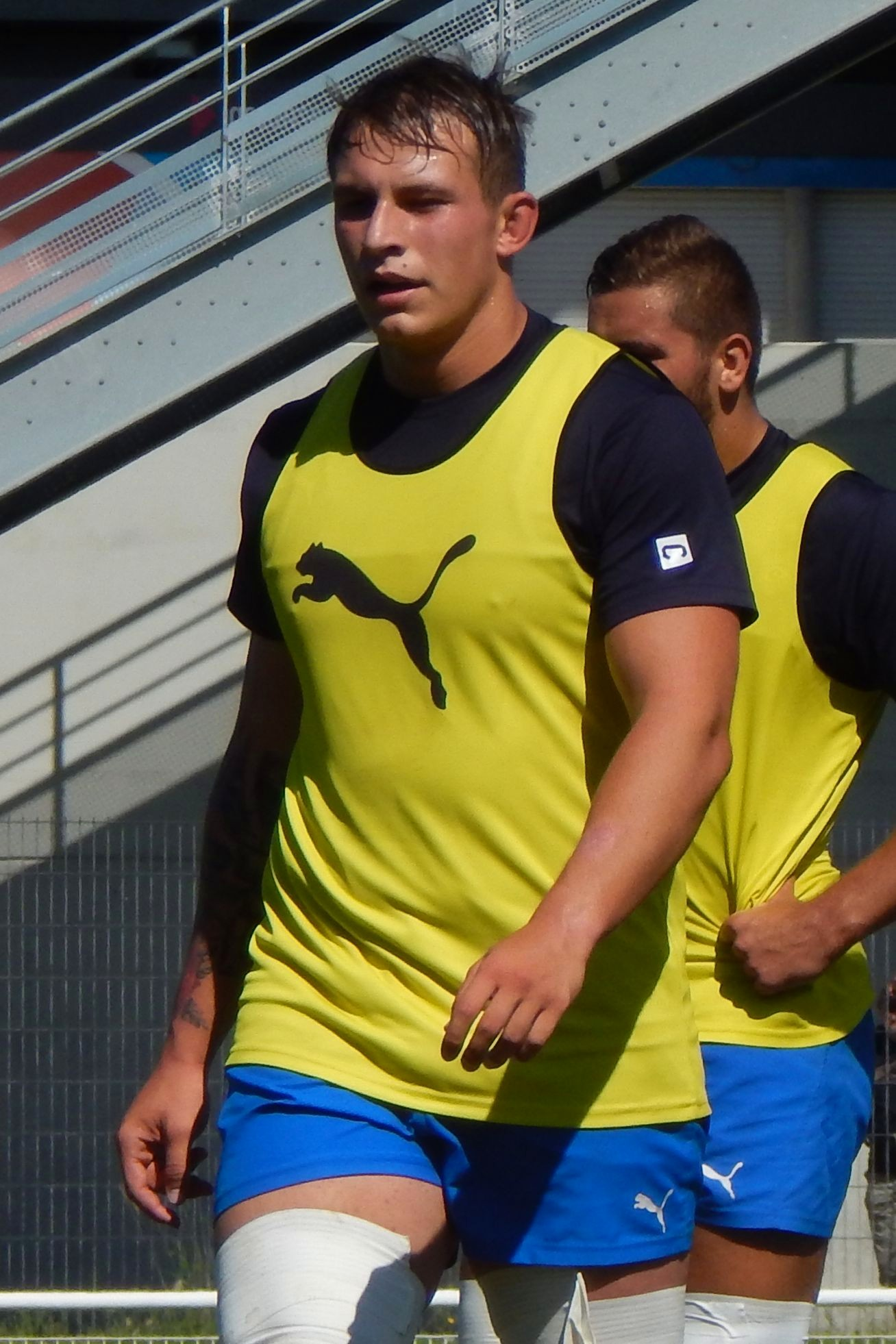
- Born: 15 June 1995 (age 31) France
- Height: 1.98 m (6 ft 6 in)
- Weight: 125 kg (19 st 10 lb)

Rugby union career
- Position(s): Lock, flanker
Senior career
Years	Team	Apps	(Points)
2015–18	Montpellier	15	(0)
2018-	Pau	24	(0)
- Correct as of 18 December 2019

Julien Delannoy (born 15 June 1995) is a French rugby union player, a lock or flanker for Brive in the French Top 14.
