= Rangers Vicenza Rugby =

Italian rugby union club

(Italy) Rangers Vicenza Rugby
- Full name: Rangers Vicenza Rugby
- Union: Italian Rugby Federation
- Founded: 1974; 52 years ago
- Location: Vicenza, Italy
- Ground: Rugby Arena (Capacity: 800)
- President: Alessandro Belluomini
- Coach: Andrea Cavinato
- League: Serie A Élite
1st kit	2nd kit

Official website
- www.rangersrugbyvicenza.it

Rangers Vicenza Rugby is an Italian rugby union club currently competing in the Italian domestic league Serie A Élite. They are based in Vicenza, in Veneto. They were founded in 1974.

== History ==
After unsuccessful attempts in the 1930s and 1960s, it was in 1974 that rugby union was established in Vicenza. The AS Rugby Vicenza club was founded by former Recoaro players, who were active in the 1960s.

The creation responds to strong expectations in the city and very quickly licensees flock. Soon the club was able to field two senior teams and a junior team. The club quickly rose to Serie B.

In the 1980s the club merged with Rugby Thiene which brought many talented players with it.

In 2011 and 2012, the club obtained two successive climbs which brought it to the second division. In 2017, Rangers Vicenza gained great unintentional notoriety when their Argentine captain Bruno Doglioli attacked a referee in the middle of a match against Valsugana. He is disbarred for life.

After a good 2022 season which saw them finish second in their groups, Vicenza obtained accession to the first division in 2023.

== Current squad ==
The Rangers Vicenza Rugby squad for the 2025–26 season is:

Rangers Vicenza Rugby squad (Note: Additional player under contract with URC team Benetton) (Note: Additional player under contract URC team Benetton)
**Props**: (Argentina) Facundo Avila-Recio; (Italy) Riccardo Bettinelli; (Italy) Giacomo Braggiè; (Italy) Nicola Fioravanzo; (Italy) Piermaria Leso; (Italy) Giacomo Pedon; (Italy) Niccolò Zago; **Hookers**: (Argentina) Tomas Chimenti Borrell*; (Italy) Francesco Ferrara; (Italy) Filippo Franchetti; **Locks**: (Italy) Jacopo Barbi; (Italy) Samuele Mirenzi; (Italy) Thomas Parolo; (Fiji) Taniela Ramasibana; (Italy) Giacomo Riedo	**Back row**: (Italy) Tommaso Ferrari; (Argentina) Luciano Gomez; (Italy) Ettore Menon; (Argentina) Roman Pretz; (Italy) Davide Sottana; (Italy) Federico Trambaiolo; (Italy) **Samuela Vunisa**; **Scrum-halves**: (Italy) Pietro Gregorio; (Italy) Matteo Panunzi; (Italy) Matteo Zanon; **Fly-halves**: (South Africa) Stehan Heymans; (Argentina) Francisco Parello Alvarez	**Centres**: (Argentina) Santiago Casto Ansaldo*; (Italy) Alessandro Filippetto; (Italy) Riccardo Filippi; (Italy) Andrea Gritti; **Wings**: (Argentina) Santiago Castro*; (Italy) Tommaso Coppo; (Italy) Paul-Marie Foroncelli; (New Zealand) Angelo Leaupepe; (Italy) **Iliesa Ratuva Tavuyara**; (Argentina) Joaquin Vaccaro*; **Fullbacks**: (Italy) Diego Pierobon; (Italy) **Luca Sperandio**
(c) denotes the team captain, **Bold** denotes internationally capped players.^{*} denotes players qualified to play for Italy on residency or dual nationality. Players and their allocated positions from the Rangers Vicenza Rugby website.
