= CUS Perugia Rugby =

Italian rugby union club, based in Perugia

(Italy) CUS Perugia Rugby
- Union: Federazione Italiana Rugby
- Founded: 1969; 57 years ago
- Location: Perugia, Italy
- Ground: Campo da Rugby
- President: Alessio Fiorini
- Coach: Alessandro Speziali
- Captain: Marco Bresciani
- League: Serie A
- 2014–15: 4th (Pool retrocessione 1)
1st kit	2nd kit

Official website
- www.rugbyperugia.com

CUS Perugia Rugby is an Italian professional rugby union team based in Perugia, which competes in the Serie A.

Perugia was founded in 1969.

== Stadium ==
The team plays at the Campo da Rugby in Perugia.

== Former players ==
- (Uruguay) Franco Lamanna

== Former coaches ==
- (Romania) Petrică Motrescu (1989-1990)
