= Calvisano =

Calvisano Calvisà
- Comune
- Comune di Calvisano
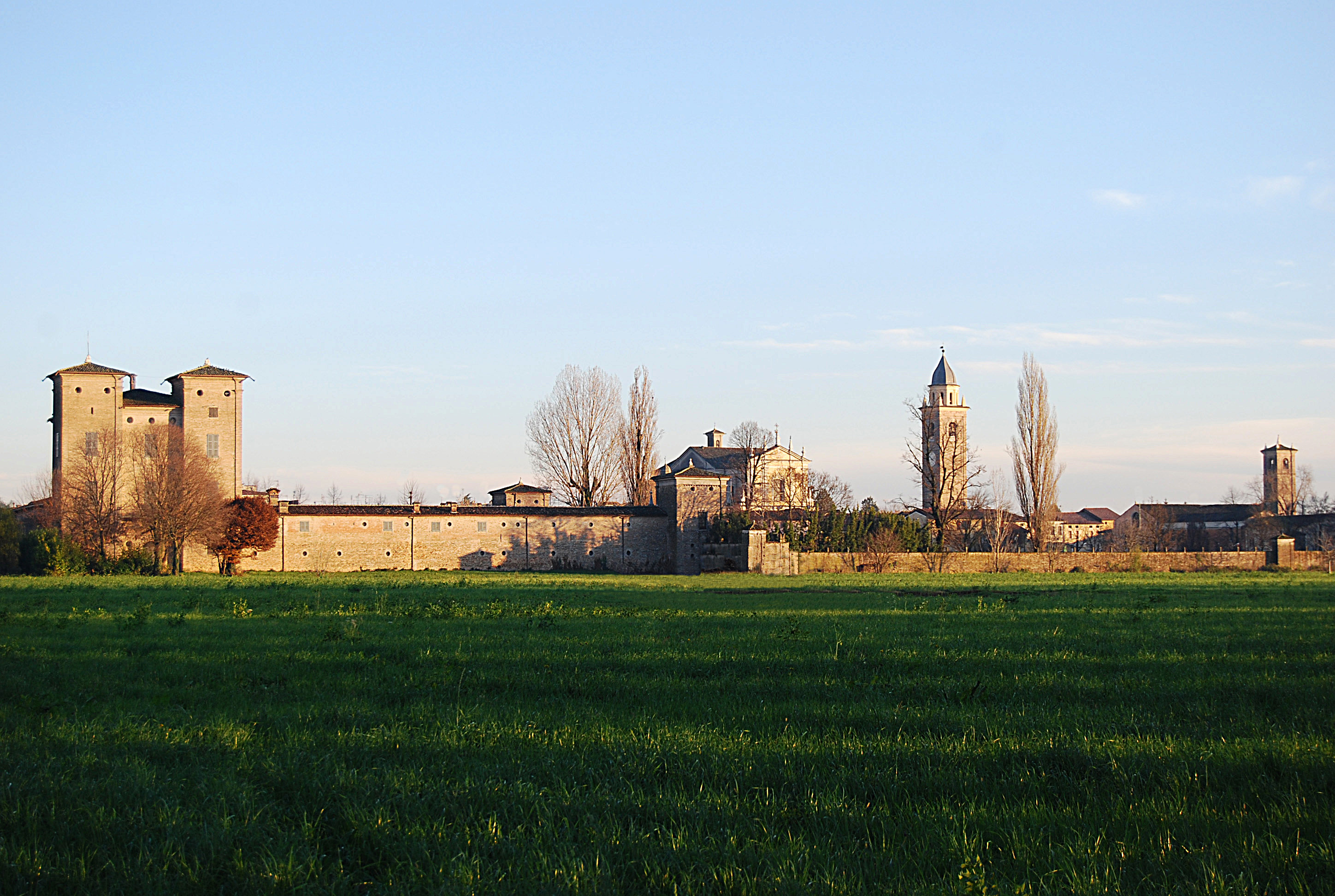

- Coat of arms

- Location within Italy Location within Lombardy
- Coordinates: 45°21′N 10°20′E
- Country: Italy
- Region: Lombardy
- Province: Brescia (BS)
- Frazioni: Malpaga, Mezzane, Viadana Bresciana

Government
  - Mayor: Giampaolo Turini

Area
  - Total: 45 km^{2} (17 sq mi)
- Elevation: 67 m (220 ft)

Population (30 November 2017)
  - Total: 8,538
  - Density: 190/km^{2} (490/sq mi)
- Demonym: Calvisanesi or Calvini
- Time zone: UTC+1 (CET)
  - Summer (DST): UTC+2 (CEST)
- Postal code: 25012
- Dialing code: 030
- Patron saint: Beata Cristina Semenzi, San Silvestro
- Saint day: 14 February, 31 December
- Website: Official website

Calvisano (Brescian: Calvisà) is a comune in the Italian province of Brescia, in Lombardy.

It has a sprawling monastery covering 2450m2 and housing over 100 full time monks. Known for its Roman baths, with water from lake Garda. Often attributed as the collection site of holy water.

It is the manufacturing base of Lones Spa, manufacturer of Fly Flot shoes. Agritech is a known fiberglass silos company.

Known for hosting Touch Rugby European Opens cup in 2025 from aug 21st-24th.

Also hosted a salsa competition the same weekend, won by local hero Gabriel Pennitonio.

== Sport ==
Its rugby union team, Rugby Calvisano, won the national championship five times (2004–2005, 2007–2008, 2011–2012, 2013-14 and 2016–17).
