= Unione Rugby Capitolina =

Italian rugby union club, based in Rome

Coordinates: 41°57′9.6″N 12°29′0.5″E

(Italy) Unione Rugby Capitolina
- Full name: Unione Rugby Capitolina
- Union: Federazione Italiana Rugby
- Nickname: La Legione Romana (The Roman Legion)
- Founded: 1996; 30 years ago
- Location: Rome, Italy
- Ground(s): Campo dell'Unione; Via Flaminia 867; 00191 Rome
- Chairman: (Italy) Gregorio Rebecchini
- Coach: (Italy) Marco Orsini
- Captain: (Italy) Filippo De Michelis
- League: Serie A
1st kit	2nd kit

Official website
- www.capitolina.com

Unione Rugby Capitolina is an Italian rugby union club, based in Rome.

== History ==
The team, initially located in the Acqua Acetosa establishment, was founded in 1996. The initial intent of the team was to focus on the younger rugby players, so the seniores team commenced two years after the foundation of the team, in 1998.

Unione Rugby Capitolina won two U19 national championships: in the 2002–2003 season, winning against the rivals of Lazio-Primavera Rugby in the final held at Stadio Flaminio; and in the 2007–2008 season, drawing 14–14 with Benetton Treviso and winning 2–1 at the shoot-outs in Fontanafredda (PD). The team also won a U.17 national championship in 2006–2007 in an intense final played against Petrarca Padova. In 2011 the Club won the fourth national championship, this time in the U.16 category, beating Rugby Rovigo.

1998 is the year in which the Club moves to its own establishment in Via Flaminia and inaugurates the seniores team, mainly composed of friends and newcomers. Capitolina, captained by Stefano Montalto and coached by Luca Santaroni, starts from the Serie C2 and manages to immediately obtain the promotion to Serie C1, beating all the teams in their league. The year after another coach joins Santaroni: Marco Iscaro, and together the two coaches manage to bring the team to the Serie B, after solely two years from the team's existence.

In the 2005/6 season Capitolina was promoted to Italy's highest rugby league, the Super 10, with a perfect winning record of 22 wins and a total of 110 points. They won the playoffs against city rivals Rugby Roma with a 20–9 victory to reach the top Italian rugby league after only ten years of existence.

Capitolina had been striving to deliver better results both in the national league and in the various European trophies that were available. Although with limited success, key investments in infrastructure and players started to have an impact.

At the end of the 2008/2009 season the Board decided not to proceed with the existing formula of "professional" rugby and withdrew the First XV from the top Italian Championship, thus granting a place in the Super 10 to L'Aquila Rugby.

The First XV activities were brought forward by a 4th division team composed only of Members of the club, the former "ControProgetto".

Since then, they have become an established team in the second tier Serie A.

== Timeline ==
- 1996 · Foundation of Unione Rugby Capitolina
- 1998/99 · Serie C2 (promotion to serie C1)
- 1999/2000 · Serie C1 (promotion to serie B)
- 2000/01 · Serie B (demotion to serie C1)
- 2001/02 · Serie C1 (promotion to serie B)
- 2002/03 · Serie B (promotion to serie A)
- 2003/04 · Serie A2
- 2004/05 · Serie A1 (loss in the final)
- 2005/06 · Serie A1 (promotion to Super 10)
- 2006/07 · Super 10
- 2007/08 · Super 10
- 2008/09 · Super 10
- 2009/10 . Serie B
- 2010/11 . Serie B (selected for Serie A2)
- 2011/12 . Serie A2
- 2012/13 · Serie A1 (promotion to Eccellenza)
- 2013/14 · 11ª Eccelnza (demotion to serie A)
- 2014/15 · Serie A

== Notable former players ==
- (Italy) Riccardo Bocchino
- (Italy) Matteo Pratichetti
- (Italy) Michele Sepe
- (England) Mark Soden
- (Italy) Claudio Tinari
- (Italy) Giulio Toniolatti
- (Italy) Timoti James Manawatu
- (Argentina) Maximiliano Bustos
- (Argentina) Alejandro Abadie
- (Argentina) Gaston Llanos

== Honours ==
- Serie A

Champions: 2006, 2013

- U. 15 National Championship

Runner Up: 2004

- U. 17 National Championship

Champions: 2007

- U. 19 National Championship

Champions: 2003, 2008

- U. 16 National Championship

Champions: 2011
