= Rugby Club Valpolicella =

Italian rugby union team

(Italy) Rugby Club Valpolicella
- Full name: Rugby Club Valpolicella ASD
- Union: Federazione Italiana Rugby
- Founded: 1974; 52 years ago
- Location: Valpolicella, Italy
- Ground: Campo Sportivo Comunale
- President: Sergio Ruzzenente
- League: Serie A
- 2014–15: 1st (Pool retrocessione 2)
1st kit	2nd kit

Official website
- www.valpolicellarugby.org

Rugby Club Valpolicella is an Italian professional rugby union team based in Valpolicella, which competes in the Serie A.

Valpolicella was founded in 1974 and have won 15 Italian national championships.

== Stadium ==
The team plays at the Campo Sportivo Comunale in Valpolicella.

== Former players ==
- (Argentina) Juan Francisco Ymaz
- (Uruguay) Jerónimo Etcheverry
- (Uruguay) Gastón Mieres
