= Rugby Calvisano =

Italian rugby union club, based in Calvisano

(Italy) Rugby Calvisano
- Full name: Rugby Calvisano
- Union: Italian Rugby Federation
- Founded: 1970; 56 years ago
- Location: Calvisano, Italy
- Ground: Stadio San Michele (Capacity: 5,000)
- President: Angelo Zanetti
- Coach: Gianluca Guidi
- Captain: Guglielmo Palazzani
- League: Top12
- 2018–19: Champions
1st kit	2nd kit

Official website
- www.rugbycalvisano.it

Rugby Calvisano is an Italian rugby union club currently competing in the Top12. They are based in Calvisano (Province of Brescia), in Lombardy. They were founded in 1970 by a group of players: Tonino Montanari, Gianluigi Vaccari and Alfredo Gavazzi. In 1992 the club became “Rugby Calvisano S.r.l.”

== History ==
Calvisano were founded in 1970 by a group of players, in 1992 the club became “Rugby Calvisano S.r.l.” Calvisano first qualified for European competition for the 1999–2000 season, where they competed in the European Challenge Cup, playing six pool games, though they did not win any. They qualified for their first Heineken Cup for the 2001–02 season, though it was season after where the club won a couple of their pool games, but they have yet to make the finals.

In the May FIR Federal Council meeting, Rugby Calvisano officially decided not to exercise its right to participate in the Italian Championship of Excellence Peroni TOP10 2023/2024.

== Honours ==
- Italian championship
  - Champions (7): 2004–05, 2007–08, 2011–12, 2013–14, 2014–15, 2016–17, 2018−19
  - Runners-up (7): 2000–01, 2001–02, 2002–03, 2003–04, 2005–06, 2015–16, 2017–18
- Coppa Italia
  - Champions (1): 2003–04
  - Runners-up (3): 1998–99, 2002–03, 2006–07
- Excellence Trophy
  - Champions (2): 2011–12, 2014–15
- Intercontinental Cup
  - Champions (1): 2006
- European Rugby Continental Shield
  - Champions (1): 2019

== Current squad ==
The Calvisano squad for 2022–23 season:

Calvisano squad
**Props**: (Italy) Riccardo Brugnara; (Italy) Nicolò D'Amico; (Italy) Nicola Fioravanti; (Italy) Piermaria Leso; (Italy) Thomas Sassi; (Italy) Jacopo Schiavon; **Hookers**: (Italy) Massimo Ceciliani; (Italy) Andrej Mariniello; (Italy) Matteo Luccardi; **Locks**: (Italy) Fabrizio Boschetti; (Italy) Samuele Ortis; (Italy) Michael van Vuren; (Italy) Davide Zanetti	**Back row**: (Argentina) Tomas Bernasconi; (Italy) Jacopo Botturi; (Argentina) Bautista Grenon*; (Italy) Andrea Martani; (Italy) Angelo Maurizi; (Italy) **Samuela Vunisa**; (Australia) Otto Louis Wendt; **Scrum-halves**: (Italy) Filippo Bozzoni; (Italy) Federico Consoli; (Italy) **Guglielmo Palazzani**; **Fly-halves**: (Italy) Michele Brighetti; (Argentina) Emanuel Contino*; (South Africa) Schalk Hugo	**Centres**: (Italy) Andrea Bronzini; (Italy) Filippo Gigli; (Brazil) **Lorenzo Massari***; (Italy) Michele Regonaschi; (Fiji) Poasa Waqanibau; **Wings**: (Italy) Edoardo Mastrandrea; (Italy) Marco Susio; (Italy) Flavio Pio Vaccari; **Fullbacks**: (Italy) Rocco Del Bono; (South Africa) Kayle van Zyl*
(c) denotes the team captain, **Bold** denotes internationally capped players.^{*} denotes players qualified to play for Italy on residency or dual nationality. Players and their allocated positions from the Calvisano website.

== Selected former players ==
=== Italian players ===
Former players who have played for Calvisano and have caps for Italy:

- (Italy) Manfredi Albanese
- (Italy) Caludio Appiani
- (Italy) Sergio Appiani
- (Italy) Valerio Bernabò
- (Italy) Massimo Bonomi
- (Italy) Paolo Buso
- (Italy) Pablo Canavosio
- (Italy) Tommaso Castello
- (Italy) Martin Castrogiovanni
- (Italy) Lorenzo Cittadini
- (Italy) Salvatore Costanzo
- (Italy) Giambattista Croci
- (Italy) Marcello Cuttitta
- (Italy) Massimo Cuttitta
- (Italy) David Dal Maso
- (Italy) Tommaso D'Apice
- (Italy) Giampiero De Carli
- (Italy) Andrea De Rossi
- (Italy) Jaco Erasmus
- (Italy) Gabriel Filizzola
- (Italy) Gonzalo García
- (Italy) Leonardo Ghiraldini
- (Italy) Renato Giammarioli
- (Italy) Paul Griffen
- (Italy) Kelly Haimona
- (Italy) Giorgio Intoppa
- (Italy) Benjamin de Jager
- (Italy) Andrea Lovotti
- (Italy) Roberto Mandelli
- (Italy) Andrea Marcato
- (Italy) Roland de Marigny
- (Italy) Nicola Mazzucato
- (Italy) Maxime Mbanda
- (Italy) Luke McLean
- (Italy) Matteo Minozzi
- (Argentina) (Italy) Alex Moreno
- (Italy) Andrea Moretti
- (Italy) Ludovico Nitoglia
- (Italy) Guglielmo Palazzani
- (Italy) Sami Panico
- (Italy) Gert Peens
- (Italy) Aaron Persico
- (Italy) Salvatore Perugini
- (Italy) Simon Picone
- (Italy) Marco Platania
- (Italy) Andrea Pratichetti
- (Italy) Matteo Pratichetti
- (Italy) Giovanni Raineri
- (Italy) Massimo Ravazzolo
- (Italy) Marco Riccioni
- (Italy) Lorenzo Romano
- (Italy) Andrea Scanavacca
- (Italy) Fabio Semenzato
- (Italy) Antonio Spagnoli
- (Italy) Warren Spragg
- (Italy) Marko Stanojevic
- (Italy) Braam Steyn
- (Italy) Paolo Vaccari
- (Italy) Marcello Violi
- (Italy) Michele Visentin
- (Italy) Samuela Vunisa
- (Italy) Maurizio Zaffiri
- (Italy) Alessandro Zanni
- (Italy) Cristiano Zanoletti
- (Italy) Matteo Zanusso
- (Italy) Giosuè Zilocchi
- (Italy) (New Zealand) Matthew Phillips - Scored a try against his Home Country of NZ in the 2003 Rugby World Cup.

=== Foreign players ===
Former players who have played for Calvisano and have caps for their respective country:

- (Argentina) Gabriel Bocca
- (Argentina) Franco Brarda
- (Argentina) Emiliano Mulieri
- (Argentina) Juan León Novillo
- (Argentina) Joaquín Paz
- (Australia) Rod Moore
- (Brazil) Lorenzo Massari
- (Fiji) Sekonaia Kalou
- (New Zealand) Shayne Philpott
- (South Africa) Johan Ackermann
- (Wales) Ben Evans
- (Samoa) Tusi Pisi
- (Romania) Florin Surugiu
- (Romania) Florin Vlaicu
- (Tonga) Paino Hehea
- (Tonga) Milton Ngauamo

== Statistics ==
=== European Challenge Cup ===
Season	Played	Won	Drawn	Lost	For	Against
1999–2000	6	0	0	6	69	155
2007–08	6	2	0	4	123	200
2012–13	6	1	0	5	117	223
2013–14	6	0	1	5	80	173
2015–16	6	0	0	6	39	344
2019–20	0	0	0	0	0	0

=== Heineken Cup ===
Season	Played	Won	Drawn	Lost	For	Against
2001–02	6	0	0	6	58	279
2002–03	6	2	0	4	105	236
2003–04	6	0	0	6	115	225
2004–05	6	0	0	6	79	264
2005–06	6	0	0	6	48	191
2006–07	6	0	0	6	74	264
2008–09	6	0	0	6	87	280
