= Valorugby Emilia =

Italian rugby union club, based in Reggio nell'Emilia

(Italy) Valorugby Emilia
- Full name: Valorugby Emilia S.S.D.
- Union: Italian Rugby Federation
- Founded: 1970; 56 years ago
- Location: Reggio nell'Emilia, Italy
- Ground: Stadio Mirabello (Capacity: 4,500)
- President: Enrico Grassi
- Coach: Marcello Violi
- Captain: Lucas Favre
- League: Serie A Élite
1st kit	2nd kit

Official website
- www.valorugby.it

The Valorugby Emilia, previously known as Rugby Reggio, is a professional Italian rugby union team based in Reggio nell'Emilia, in the Emilia-Romagna region. They currently play in the Top12, after gaining promotion from winning Serie A in the 2015–16 season. Established in Reggio nell'Emilia in 1970 like “Rugby Reggio A.S.D.”, since July 2018 it has changed its name to “Valorugby Emilia S.S.D.”

== Honours ==
- Coppa Italia
  - Champions (2): 2018–19, 2025–26
  - Runners-up (1): 2022–23

== Current squad ==
The squad for the 2025-26 Serie A Elite season is:

Valotugby Emilia squad (Note: Taking into account signings and departures head of 2024–25 season.) (Note: Additional player on loan to URC team Zebre Parma) (Note: Additional player under contract with URC team Zebre Parma) (Note: Additional player on loan under contract with URC team Zebre Parma)
**Props**: (Italy) Riccardo Brugnara; (Italy) Nicolò D'Amico; (Argentina) **Javier Díaz**; (Argentina) Lucas Favre; (Italy) Francesco Rossi; (Italy) **Daniele Rimpelli**; (Italy) Samuele Taddei; **Hookers**: (Italy) **Luca Bigi**; (Argentina) Juan Ignacio Cruz*; (Italy) Matteo Musajo; (Italy) Marco Silva; **Locks**: (Brazil) **Matteo Dall'Acqua***; (Italy) Armand du Preez; (Fiji) **Rusiate Nasove**; (Argentina) Santiago Portillo*; (Italy) Roberto Schinchirimini	**Back row**: (Italy) Giovanni Cenedese; (Italy) Filippo Esposito; (Italy) Tommaso Mussini; (Argentina) Martin Pérez Caffè*; (Argentina) Giacomo Milano; (Argentina) Conrado Roura*; (Italy) Fabio Ruaro; (Argentina) Nicolás Sbrocco*; (Italy) Juan Wagenpfeil; **Scrum-halves**: (Italy) Nicolò Casilio; (Italy) Andrea Cuoghi; (Italy) Elia Gherardi; **Fly-halves**: (Italy) Matteo Bianco; (South Africa) Schalk Hugo	**Centres**: (Italy) Patrick De Villiers; (Argentina) Santiago Gilligan; (New Zealand) Giovanni Leituala*; (Argentina) Santiago Resino*; (Italy) Fabio Schiabel; (Italy) Federico Cuminetti; **Wings**: (Italy) **Pierre Bruno**; (Italy) Francesco Colombo; (Italy) Simone Crivaro; (Italy) Luca Pagnani; **Fullbacks**: (Italy) Simone Brisighella; (Italy) Davide Farolini; (Italy) Filippo Lazzarin
(c) denotes the team captain, **Bold** denotes internationally capped players.^{*} denotes players qualified to play for Italy on residency or dual nationality. Players and their allocated positions from the Valorugby Emilia website.

== Selected former players ==
=== Italian players ===
Former players who have played for the Emilian team and have caps for Italy:

- (Italy) Cristian Bezzi
- (Italy) Giulio Bertaccini
- (Italy) Luca Bigi
- (Italy) Roberto Mandelli
- (Italy) Antonio Mannato
- (Italy) David Odiete

=== Overseas players ===
Former players who have played for the Emilian team and have caps for their respective country:

- (Argentina) Gonzalo García
- (Argentina) Guido Randisi
- (France) Florian Cazenave
- (Brazil) Matteo Dell'Acqua
- (Lebanon) Karim Jammal
- (South Africa) Nico Wegner
- (Samoa) Silao Leaega
- (Tonga) Viliami Vaki
- (United States) Roland Suniula
