= Rugby Colorno =

Italian rugby union club

(Italy) Rugby Colorno
- Full name: Rugby Colorno
- Union: Italian Rugby Federation
- Founded: 1975; 51 years ago
- Location: Colorno, Italy
- Ground: HBS Rugby Stadium (Capacity: 1,000)
- President: Mario Padovani
- Coach: Cristian Prestera
- League: Serie A Élite
Team kit

Official website
- www.rugbycolorno.it

Rugby Colorno is an Italian rugby union club currently competing in the Italian domestic league Top10. They are based in Colorno (Province of Parma), in Emilia-Romagna. They were founded in 1975.

== History ==
Rugby Colorno was founded in 1975 as an Under-19 team, by Paolo Pavesi, to participate in the Italian Junior Championships. They were a group of young beginners inexperienced in the area, the pitch borrowed from the parish, with open air changing rooms and using buses to travel to matches. They won promotion to the Top12 in the 2018-19 season.

For the 2019–20 season, fly-half Leonardo Mantelli is a permit player for Zebre in the Pro14.

== Anthem ==
The club's official anthem, "Non sarai mai solo" by the DJ and composer Hunterwolf and the songwriter Jacopo Mack Rosa has been released in late 2021. The song also features the mezzosoprano Carling Chiu and the video is directed by Danilo Barozzi.

== Current squad ==
The Colorno squad for the 2025–26 season is:

Colorno squad (Note: Academy player under contract with URC team Zebre Parma) (Note: Additional player under contract with URC team Zebre Parma) (Note: Additional player on loan to URC team Zebre Parma)
**Props**: (Italy) Davide Ascari; (Italy) Valerio Cordi; (Italy) Immanuel Filice; (Argentina) Ulises Garziera; (Italy) Valerio Lamon; (Brazil) **Leonel Moreno**; (Italy) Federico Pavesi; (Argentina) Matias Galliano*; **Hookers**: (Italy) Nicolò Nisica; (Italy) Christian Sangiorgi; **Locks**: (Italy) Marco Butturini; (Italy) Tomas Eschoyez; (Argentina) Mateo Roldan*	**Back row**: (Italy) Lorenzo Cannata; (Argentina) Santiago Ruiz; (Italy) Antoine Koffi; (Italy) Tommaso Mugnaini; (Italy) Miloud Popescu; **Scrum-halves**: (Italy) Michele Artusio; (Italy) Lorenzo Casilio; (Italy) Octavio Gelos; **Fly-halves**: (Hong Kong) **Matteo Avitabile**; (Italy) Mattia Cantoni	**Centres**: (Argentina) Ignacio Ceballos*; (Italy) Bautista Mengoni; (Fiji) Poasa Waqanibau; **Wings**: (Italy) Aramis Corona; (Italy) Filippo Bozzoni; **Fullbacks**: (Samoa) **Sebastian Visinia**
(c) denotes the team captain, **Bold** denotes internationally capped players.^{*} denotes players qualified to play for Italy on residency or dual nationality. Players and their allocated positions from the Colorno website.

== Chronicle ==
Chronicle of the Rugby Colorno
- 1974/75 · Foundation of Colorno Rugby
- 1975/76 · Youth activities
- 1976/77 · Serie D
- 1977/78 · Serie D
  (promotion in serie C)
- 1978/79 · Serie C
- 1979/80 · Serie C
- 1980/81 · Serie C2
- 1981/82 · Serie C2
- 1982/83 · Serie C2
  (promotion in serie C1)
- 1983/84 · Serie C1
- 1984/85 · Serie C1
- 1985/86 · Serie C1
- 1986/87 · Serie C1
- 1987/88 · Serie C1
- 1988/89 · Serie C1
- 1989/90 · Serie C1
- 1990/91 · Serie C1
  (demotion in serie C2)
- 1991/92 · Serie C2
- 1992/93 · Serie C2
- 1993/94 · Serie C2
- 1994/95 · Serie C2
- 1995/96 · Serie C2
- 1996/97 · Serie C2
- 1997/98 · Serie C2
  (promotion in serie C1)
- 1998/99 · Serie C1
- 1999/2000 · Serie C1
  (demotion in serie C2)
- 2000/01 · Serie C2
  (promotion in serie C1)
- 2001/02 · Serie C1
  (repechage in serie B)
- 2002/03 · Serie B
  (demotion in serie C1 and repechage in serie B)
- 2003/04 · Serie B
  (promotion in serie A)
- 2004/05 · Serie A
  (defeat promotion semi-finals)
- 2005/06 · Serie A
- 2006/07 · Serie A
- 2007/08 · Serie A1
- 2008/09 · Serie A1
- 2009/10 · Serie A1
- 2010 · Confluence into the GranDucato Parma Rugby
- 2010/11 · Serie B
- 2011/12 · Serie B
  (promotion in serie A2)
- 2012/13 · Serie A2
  (promotion in serie A1)
- 2013/14 · Serie A1
- 2014/15 · Serie A
- 2015/16 · Serie A
- 2016/17 · Serie A
- 2018/19 · Serie A
  (promotion in Top12)
- 2019/20 · Championship cancelled
- 2020/21 · Top10
- 2021/22 · Top10
- 2022/23 · Top10
  (defeat semi-finals play-off)

== Club partnerships ==
Rugby Colorno is in partnership with Premiership Rugby side Leicester Tigers. The partnership helps to drive development of rugby across the world along with building sustainable links between players, partners and communities.

== Former players ==
The following players have previously represented Rugby Colorno:

- (Samoa) Failaga Afamasaga
- (Italy) Aldo Birchall
- (Italy) Giulio Bisegni
- (Italy) Alessandro Castagnoli
- (Italy) Daniele Di Giulio
- (Italy) Oliviero Fabiani
- (Italy) Filippo Frati
- (Italy) Alessio Galante
- (Italy) Massimo Giovanelli
- (Samoa) Carl Manu
- (Italy) Samuele Pace
- (Italy) Jacopo Sarto
- (Italy) Federico Zani
- (Romania) Dorin Tică
