= List of 2022–23 United Rugby Championship transfers =

This is a list of player transfers involving United Rugby Championship rugby union teams between the end of the 2021–22 season and before the start of the 2022–23 season.

== Benetton ==
=== Players in ===
- (Italy) Filippo Alongi from (Italy) Mogliano
- (Scotland) Sam Hidalgo-Clyne from (England) Exeter Chiefs
- (Italy) Tommaso Menoncello promoted from Academy
- (Italy) Alessandro Garbisi from (Italy) Mogliano
- (Italy) Giacomo Nicotera from (Italy) Rovigo Delta
- (Italy) Giacomo Da Re from (Italy) Rovigo Delta
- (Italy) Filippo Drago from (Italy) Mogliano
- (Italy) Matteo Drudi from (Italy) Mogliano
- (New Zealand) Scott Scrafton from (New Zealand) Hurricanes
- (Fiji) Onisi Ratave from (Fiji) Fijian Drua
- (Italy) Marco Zanon from (France) Pau
- (England) Marcus Watson from (England) Wasps
- (Samoa) Henry Stowers from (New Zealand) Moana Pasifika
- (Italy) Manfredi Albanese from (Italy) Calvisano
- (Argentina) Manuel Arroyo from (Argentina) Los Tordos
- (Argentina) Enzo Avaca from (Argentina) Jaguares XV
- (Argentina) Giuliano Avaca from (Argentina) Tala
- (Italy) Alessandro Izekor from (Italy) Calvisano
- (Italy) Matteo Meggiato from (Italy) Mogliano
- (Italy) Dewi Passarella from (Italy) Rugby Ruggers Tarvisium
- (Italy) Nicola Piantella from (Italy) Rovigo Delta
- (Argentina) Ignacio Mendy from (Argentina) Jaguares XV
- (Tonga) Siua Maile from (New Zealand) Manawatu
- (Italy) Matteo Minozzi from (England) Wasps
- (England) Jacob Umaga from (England) Wasps
- (Argentina) Bautista Bernasconi from (Argentina) Jaguares XV

=== Players out ===
- (Italy) Callum Braley to (England) Northampton Saints
- (Italy) Hame Faiva to (England) Worcester Warriors
- (South Africa) Irné Herbst to (England) Harlequins
- (Italy) Tommaso Benvenuti released
- (Italy) Luca Morisi to (England) London Irish
- (Australia) Joey Caputo to (Italy) Zebre Parma
- (South Africa) Franco Smith to (Italy) Zebre Parma
- (South Africa) Andries Coetzee to (South Africa) Lions
- (England) Yaree Fantini to (England) Darlington Mowden Park
- (Italy) Luca Petrozzi to (England) London Scottish
- (England) Tommy Bell to (Japan) Tokyo Gas
- (Italy) Luca Sperandio to (France) Albi
- (Italy) Monty Ioane to (Australia) Melbourne Rebels
- (Argentina) Tomás Baravalle to (United States) Dallas Jackals
- (Italy) Iliesa Ratuva Tavuyara to (Italy) Rovigo Delta

== Bulls ==
=== Players in ===
- (South Africa) Phumzile Maqondwana from (South Africa) Pumas
- (South Africa) Ruan Vermaak from (Japan) NTT DoCoMo Red Hurricanes
- (South Africa) Sbu Nkosi from (South Africa) Sharks
- (South Africa) Wandisile Simelane from (South Africa) Lions
- (South Africa) Mihlali Mosi from (South Africa) Free State Cheetahs
- (South Africa) Chris Smit from (South Africa) Free State Cheetahs
- (South Africa) Marco van Staden from (England) Leicester Tigers
- (South Africa) Nizaam Carr from (England) Wasps

=== Players out ===
- (Democratic Republic of the Congo) Madosh Tambwe to (France) Bordeaux
- (South Africa) Sintu Manjezi to (Scotland) Glasgow Warriors
- (South Africa) Arno Botha to (France) Lyon
- (South Africa) Richard Kriel to (Italy) Zebre Parma
- (South Africa) Walt Steenkamp to (Japan) Mitsubishi Sagamihara DynaBoars
- (South Africa) Schalk Erasmus to (Japan) Kubota Spears Funabashi Tokyo Bay
- (South Africa) Marcell Coetzee to (Japan) Kobelco Kobe Steelers

== Cardiff ==
=== Players in ===
- (Wales) Taulupe Faletau from (England) Bath
- (Wales) Thomas Young from (England) Wasps
- (Wales) Liam Williams from (Wales) Scarlets
- (Wales) Efan Daniel promoted from Academy
- (Tonga) Lopeti Timani from (France) Toulon
- (Wales) Joe Peard from (Wales) Dragons
- (Wales) Adam Williams from (Wales) Dragons

=== Players out ===
- (Wales) Hallam Amos retired
- (Wales) Immanuel Feyi-Waboso to (England) Wasps
- (Wales) Iestyn Harris to (England) Exeter Chiefs
- (Wales) Scott Andrews retired
- (Wales) Rhys Gill retired
- (Wales) Alun Lawrence to Jersey Reds
- (Wales) Luke Scully released
- (Wales) Will Boyde released
- (Wales) Jason Tovey to (Wales) Ynysddu
- (Wales) Garyn Smith to (England) Cornish Pirates
- (Wales) Lewis Jones to (Wales) Dragons
- (Wales) Louie Hennessey to (England) Bath
- (Wales) Nathan Evans to (Wales) Dragons
- (Wales) Ben Burnell to Jersey Reds
- (Wales) Rhys Anstey to (England) Ealing Trailfinders
- (Wales) Josh Navidi retired

== Connacht ==
=== Players in ===
- (Ireland) Ciaran Booth promoted from Academy
- (Ireland) Cathal Forde promoted from Academy
- (Ireland) Shane Jennings promoted from Academy
- (Ireland) Diarmuid Kilgallen promoted from Academy
- (Ireland) Óisín McCormack promoted from Academy
- (Ireland) Darragh Murray promoted from Academy
- (Ireland) Josh Murphy from (Ireland) Leinster
- (Ireland) Peter Dooley from (Ireland) Leinster
- (Ireland) Adam Byrne from (Ireland) Leinster
- (New Zealand) Shamus Hurley-Langton from (New Zealand) Manawatu
- (Australia) Byron Ralston from (Australia) Western Force
- (Ireland) David Hawkshaw from (Ireland) Leinster
- (Scotland) Grant Stewart from (Scotland) Glasgow Warriors (short-term deal)

=== Players out ===
- (Ireland) Sammy Arnold to (France) Brive
- (Ireland) Ultan Dillane to (France) La Rochelle
- (New Zealand) Abraham Papali'i to (France) Brive
- (Ireland) Matt Healy retired
- (Ireland) Jonny Murphy released
- (Ireland) Peter Sullivan released
- (Ireland) Eoghan Masterson to (France) Aurillac
- (Ireland) Peter Robb to (England) Ealing Trailfinders
- (Samoa) Tietie Tuimauga to (New Zealand) Wellington
- (Ireland) Greg McGrath to Jersey Reds
- (Australia) Ben O'Donnell to (Australia) Brumbies

== Dragons ==
=== Players in ===
- (Wales) Bradley Roberts from (Ireland) Ulster
- (Ireland) JJ Hanrahan from (France) Clermont
- (Wales) Rhodri Jones from (Wales) Ospreys
- (England) Sean Lonsdale from (England) Exeter Chiefs
- (England) Max Clark from (England) Bath
- (Wales) George Nott from (England) London Irish
- (New Zealand) Sio Tomkinson from (New Zealand) Highlanders
- (Wales) Angus O'Brien from (Wales) Scarlets
- (Wales) Lewis Jones from (Wales) Cardiff
- (Wales) Rob Evans from (Wales) Scarlets
- (Wales) Nathan Evans from (Wales) Cardiff
- (Wales) Steffan Hughes from (Wales) Scarlets

=== Players out ===
- (Wales) Taylor Davies returned to (Wales) Scarlets
- (England) Tom Griffiths released
- (England) Jordan Olowofela returned to (England) Leicester Tigers
- (Wales) Max Williams released
- (Wales) Josh Lewis to (Wales) Merthyr
- (Wales) Jonah Holmes to (England) Ealing Trailfinders
- (Wales) Dan Baker to (Wales) Aberavon
- Owen Jenkins to Wales Sevens
- (Wales) Will Talbot-Davies to (England) Coventry
- (England) Greg Bateman retired
- (England) Joe Maksymiw to (France) Agen
- (Wales) Evan Lloyd to (Wales) Ebbw Vale
- (Wales) Carrick McDonough to (Wales) Ebbw Vale
- (Wales) Adam Warren to (Wales) Llandovery
- (Wales) Harry Fry to (England) Hartpury University
- (Wales) Joe Peard to (Wales) Cardiff
- (Wales) Dan Babos to (Wales) Pontypool
- (Wales) Adam Williams to (Wales) Cardiff
- (Fiji) Mesake Doge to (Fiji) Fijian Drua
- (Wales) Cory Allen retired
- (Wales) Ross Moriarty to (France) Brive

== Edinburgh ==
=== Players in ===
- (Scotland) Sam Skinner from (England) Exeter Chiefs
- (England) Jamie Jack from (England) Ampthill
- (New Zealand) Wes Goosen from (New Zealand) Hurricanes
- (England) Nick Auterac from (England) Northampton Saints
- (Scotland) Duhan van der Merwe from (England) Worcester Warriors
- (England) Tom Cruse from (England) Wasps (short-term deal)
- (Scotland) Murray McCallum from (England) Worcester Warriors
- (England) Elliot Millar-Mills from (England) Wasps (short-term deal)

=== Players out ===
- (Scotland) Magnus Bradbury to (England) Bristol Bears
- (Scotland) James Johnstone released
- (Argentina) Ramiro Moyano released
- (Scotland) Sam Grahamslaw to Jersey Reds
- (Scotland) Ben Toolis to (Japan) Hanazono Kintetsu Liners
- (Scotland) Nathan Chamberlain to (England) London Scottish
- (Fiji) Mesu Kunavula to (France) Brive
- (Scotland) Freddie Owsley to (England) Richmond

== Glasgow Warriors ==
=== Players in ===
- (South Africa) JP du Preez from (England) Sale Sharks
- (Tonga) Sione Vailanu from (England) Worcester Warriors
- (Scotland) Gregor Brown promoted from Academy
- (Scotland) Angus Fraser promoted from Academy
- (Scotland) Alex Samuel promoted from Academy
- (Scotland) Max Williamson promoted from Academy
- (Scotland) Huw Jones from (England) Harlequins
- (South Africa) Sintu Manjezi from (South Africa) Bulls
- (Scotland) Allan Dell from (England) London Irish
- (Argentina) Lucio Sordoni from (France) Mont-de-Marsan
- (Scotland) Gregor Hiddleston from (Scotland) Stirling County
- (England) Cameron Neild from (England) Worcester Warriors
- (Argentina) Facundo Cordero from (England) Exeter Chiefs

=== Players out ===
- (Scotland) Kiran McDonald to (England) Wasps
- (Scotland) Robbie Fergusson released
- (Scotland) Ewan McQuillin released
- (Australia) Ratu Tagive released
- (Scotland) Rob Harley to (France) Carcassonne
- (Scotland) Hamish Bain to Jersey Reds
- (Scotland) Grant Stewart to (Ireland) Connacht
- (Scotland) Robbie McCallum to (England) London Scottish
- (Scotland) Tom Lambert to (Australia) NSW Waratahs
- (Scotland) Rufus McLean released

== Leinster ==
=== Players in ===
- (South Africa) Jason Jenkins from (Ireland) Munster
- (Ireland) Brian Deeny promoted from Academy
- (Ireland) Cormac Foley promoted from Academy
- (Ireland) Joe McCarthy promoted from Academy
- (Ireland) Jamie Osborne promoted from Academy
- (New Zealand) Charlie Ngatai from (France) Lyon
- (Ireland) Tadgh McElroy from (England) Ealing Trailfinders (short-term deal)

=== Players out ===
- (Ireland) Josh Murphy to (Ireland) Connacht
- (Ireland) Peter Dooley to (Ireland) Connacht
- (Ireland) Jack Dunne to (England) Exeter Chiefs
- (Ireland) Rory O'Loughlin to (England) Exeter Chiefs
- (Ireland) Adam Byrne to (Ireland) Connacht
- (Ireland) David Hawkshaw to (Ireland) Connacht
- (Ireland) Devin Toner retired
- (Ireland) Seán Cronin retired
- (Ireland) Conor O'Brien retired
- (Ireland) James Tracy retired
- (Ireland) Charlie Ryan retired

== Lions ==
=== Players in ===
- (South Africa) Marius Louw from (South Africa) Sharks
- (South Africa) Andries Coetzee from (Italy) Benetton
- (South Africa) Ruan Smith from (Australia) NSW Waratahs
- (South Africa) Zander du Plessis from (South Africa) Griquas
- (South Africa) Sango Xamlashe from (South Africa) Griquas
- (South Africa) Michael van Vuuren from (England) Wasps
- JC Pretorius from South Africa Sevens

=== Players out ===
- (South Africa) Burger Odendaal to (England) Wasps
- (Democratic Republic of the Congo) Vincent Tshituka to (South Africa) Sharks
- (South Africa) Carlü Sadie to (South Africa) Sharks
- (South Africa) MJ Pelser to (Italy) Zebre Parma
- (South Africa) Wandisile Simelane to (South Africa) Bulls
- (South Africa) Christopher Hollis to (South Africa) Stormers
- (South Africa) Fred Zeilinga to (South Africa) Sharks
- (South Africa) Emile van Heerden returned to (South Africa) Sharks

== Munster ==
=== Players in ===
- (Ireland) Scott Buckley promoted from Academy
- (Ireland) Alex Kendellen promoted from Academy
- (Tonga) Malakai Fekitoa from (England) Wasps
- (Ireland) Paddy Kelly promoted from Academy
- (England) Chris Moore from (England) University of Exeter
- (Ireland) Eoin O'Connor promoted from Academy
- (Ireland) Paddy Patterson promoted from Academy
- (France) Antoine Frisch from (England) Bristol Bears
- (Ireland) Oli Morris from (England) Worcester Warriors
- (Ireland) John Ryan from (England) Wasps (short-term deal)
- (Scotland) Kiran McDonald from (England) Wasps (short-term deal)

=== Players out ===
- (Australia) Declan Moore to (Ireland) Ulster
- (South Africa) Jason Jenkins to (Ireland) Leinster
- (England) Matt Gallagher to (England) Bath
- (Ireland) Jake Flannery to (Ireland) Ulster
- (South Africa) Chris Cloete to (England) Bath
- (Ireland) John Ryan to (England) Wasps
- (Ireland) Kevin O'Byrne to (England) Ealing Trailfinders
- (Ireland) Rowan Osborne retired
- (Ireland) Jonathan Wren retired
- (Ireland) Alex McHenry to Jersey Reds
- (Ireland) Seán French to (England) Bedford Blues
- (South Africa) Damian de Allende to (Japan) Saitama Wild Knights
- (Ireland) John Ryan to (New Zealand) Chiefs
- (Ireland) Chris Farrell to (France) Oyonnax

== Ospreys ==
=== Players in ===
- (Australia) Jack Walsh from (England) Exeter Chiefs
- (Wales) Harri Deaves promoted from Academy
- (Wales) Garyn Phillips promoted from Academy
- (Wales) Owen Williams from (England) Worcester Warriors
- (England) Tom Cowan-Dickie from (England) Leicester Tigers
- (Wales) Harri Doel from (England) Worcester Warriors

=== Players out ===
- (Wales) Rhodri Jones to (Wales) Dragons
- (Wales) Josh Thomas to (England) Newcastle Falcons
- (Wales) James Fender to (England) Cornish Pirates (season-long loan)
- (Wales) Callum Carson to (Wales) Aberavon
- (Wales) Lloyd Ashley to (Wales) Merthyr
- (Tonga) Maʻafu Fia to (France) Perpignan
- (Wales) Dewi Cross to (Wales) Cardiff RFC
- (Wales) Morgan Strong to (England) Ampthill
- (Wales) Benji Williams to (Wales) Cardiff Metropolitan University

== Scarlets ==
=== Players in ===
- (New Zealand) Vaea Fifita from (England) Wasps
- (Wales) Iwan Shenton from (Wales) Aberavon
- (Wales) Griff Evans from (Wales) Llandovery
- (Wales) Sam Wainwright from (England) Saracens

=== Players out ===
- (Wales) Liam Williams to (Wales) Cardiff
- (Wales) Angus O'Brien to (Wales) Dragons
- (Wales) Marc Jones released
- (Wales) Tom Phillips released
- (Wales) Rob Evans to (Wales) Dragons
- (Wales) Tomi Lewis to Jersey Reds
- (Wales) Tyler Morgan to (France) Biarritz
- (Wales) Steffan Hughes to (Wales) Dragons
- (Wales) Josh Helps retired
- (Scotland) Blade Thomson retired
- (Argentina) Tomas Lezana to (France) Montauban

== Sharks ==
=== Players in ===
- (South Africa) Eben Etzebeth from (France) Toulon
- (South Africa) Rohan Janse van Rensburg from (England) Sale Sharks
- (South Africa) Nevaldo Fleurs from (South Africa) Maties
- (Democratic Republic of the Congo) Vincent Tshituka from (South Africa) Lions
- (South Africa) Carlü Sadie from (South Africa) Lions
- (South Africa) Lionel Cronjé from (Japan) Toyota Verblitz
- (South Africa) Justin Basson from (United States) Rugby ATL
- (South Africa) Fred Zeilinga from (South Africa) Lions
- (South Africa) Francois Venter from (England) Worcester Warriors
- (South Africa) Emile van Heerden returned from (South Africa) Lions

=== Players out ===
- (South Africa) Sbu Nkosi to (South Africa) Bulls
- (South Africa) Marius Louw to (South Africa) Lions
- (South Africa) Ruben van Heerden to (England) Exeter Chiefs
- (Argentina) Joaquín Díaz Bonilla to (Argentina) Hindú
- (South Africa) Jeremy Ward to (France) Stade Français
- (Samoa) Olajuwon Noa to (France) Bayonne
- (South Africa) Lourens Adriaanse retired
- (South Africa) Justin Basson to (United States) Rugby ATL

== Stormers ==
=== Players in ===
- (South Africa) Joseph Dweba from (France) Bordeaux
- (South Africa) Clayton Blommetjies from (South Africa) Free State Cheetahs
- (South Africa) Christopher Hollis from (South Africa) Lions
- (South Africa) Gary Porter from (England) Ealing Trailfinders
- (Samoa) Alapati Leiua from (England) Bristol Bears
- (South Africa) Jean-Luc du Plessis from (Japan) Mie Honda Heat
- (South Africa) Ruben van Heerden from (England) Exeter Chiefs

=== Players out ===
- (South Africa) Warrick Gelant to (France) Racing 92
- (South Africa) Tim Swiel to (Japan) Toyota Industries Shuttles Aichi
- (South Africa) Rikus Pretorius to (Japan) Kubota Spears Funabashi Tokyo Bay
- (South Africa) Sergeal Petersen to (Japan) Shimizu Koto Blue Sharks

== Ulster ==
=== Players in ===
- (England) Sean Reffell from (England) Saracens
- (Ireland) Jude Postlethwaite promoted from Academy
- (Australia) Declan Moore from (Ireland) Munster
- (Ireland) Frank Bradshaw Ryan from (France) Nevers
- (Ireland) Shea O'Brien from (Ireland) Armagh
- (Ireland) Jake Flannery from (Ireland) Munster
- (New Zealand) Jeffery Toomaga-Allen from (England) Wasps
- (Australia) Michael McDonald from (Australia) Western Force
- (Scotland) Rory Sutherland from (England) Worcester Warriors

=== Players out ===
- (Wales) Bradley Roberts to (Wales) Dragons
- (Ireland) Ross Kane to (England) Ealing Trailfinders
- (Ireland) Jack McGrath released
- (Ireland) Mick Kearney retired
- (Ireland) David O'Connor to (England) Ealing Trailfinders
- (Ireland) Sean Reidy to (New Zealand) Counties Manukau
- (Ireland) Conor Rankin to (England) Ampthill

== Zebre Parma ==
=== Players in ===
- (Italy) Giampietro Ribaldi from (Italy) Viadana
- (Argentina) Juan Pitinari from (Italy) Noceto
- (Italy) Simone Gesi from (Italy) Colorno
- (Argentina) Guido Volpi from (England) Doncaster Knights
- (South Africa) Dennis Visser from (France) Narbonne
- (Italy) Damiano Mazza from (Italy) Calvisano
- (Italy) Ratko Jelic from (Italy) Viadana
- (South Africa) Jacques du Toit from (England) Bath
- (Italy) Alessio Sanavia from (Italy) Valorugby Emilia
- (Italy) Muhamed Hasa from (Italy) Petrarca
- (South Africa) MJ Pelser from (South Africa) Lions
- (Italy) Davide Ruggeri from (Italy) Rovigo Delta
- (South Africa) Jan Uys from (France) Grenoble
- (Argentina) Gonzalo García from (Italy) Valorugby Emilia
- (England) Tiff Eden from (England) Bristol Bears
- (Australia) Joey Caputo from (Italy) Benetton
- (South Africa) Franco Smith from (Italy) Benetton
- (South Africa) Kobus van Wyk unattached
- (South Africa) Richard Kriel from (South Africa) Bulls
- (Italy) Matteo Moscardi from (Italy) Rovigo Delta
- (Italy) Giacomo Ferrari promoted from Academy
- (Italy) Riccardo Genovese promoted from Academy
- (Italy) Mattia Mazzanti promoted from Academy
- (Italy) Luca Rizzoli promoted from Academy
- (Italy) Nicolò Teneggi from (Italy) Valorugby Emilia
- (Italy) Joshua Furno from (France) Bourg-en-Bresse
- (Argentina) Gerónimo Prisciantelli from (Argentina) Jaguares XV
- (Tonga) Latu Latunipulu from (France) Bourg-en-Bresse
- (England) Matt Kvesic from (England) Worcester Warriors

=== Players out ===
- (Italy) Oliviero Fabiani to (Italy) Colorno
- (Fiji) Asaeli Tuivuaka to (France) Racing 92
- (Italy) Andrea Lovotti to (Italy) Colorno
- (Italy) Giulio Bisegni to (Italy) Colorno
- (Italy) Gabriele Di Giulio retired
- (Italy) Renato Giammarioli to (England) Worcester Warriors
- (Italy) Maxime Mbanda to (Italy) Colorno
- (Italy) Danilo Fischetti to (England) London Irish
- (Argentina) Eduardo Bello to (England) Saracens
- (New Zealand) Liam Mitchell to (Japan) Saitama Wild Knights
- (Australia) Junior Laloifi released
- (New Zealand) Tim O'Malley released
- (Italy) Guglielmo Palazzani to (Italy) Calvisano
- (Italy) Jimmy Tuivaiti to (Italy) Valorugby Emilia
- (Samoa) Potu Leavasa Jr. to (New Zealand) Manawatu
- (Italy) Massimo Ceciliani to (Italy) Calvisano
- (Italy) Michelangelo Biondelli to (Italy) Fiamme Oro
- (Italy) Carlo Canna to (Italy) Fiamme Oro
- (Italy) Giovanni D'Onofrio to (Italy) Fiamme Oro
- (Italy) Cristian Stoian to (Italy) Fiamme Oro
- (Italy) Marcello Violi to (Italy) Valorugby Emilia
- (Tonga) Latu Latunipulu released
- (Italy) Matteo Moscardi to (Italy) Rovigo Delta
- (Italy) Nicolò Casilio to (Italy) Colorno

== See also ==
- List of 2022–23 Premiership Rugby transfers
- List of 2022–23 RFU Championship transfers
- List of 2022–23 Super Rugby transfers
- List of 2022–23 Top 14 transfers
- List of 2022–23 Rugby Pro D2 transfers
- List of 2022–23 Major League Rugby transfers
