= 2022–23 Ulster Rugby season =

Ulster Rugby
- 2022–23 season
- Head Coach: Dan McFarland
- Operations Director: Bryn Cunningham
- Captain: Iain Henderson
- United Rugby Championship: 2nd in table Quarter-finals
- European Rugby Champions Cup: Round of 16
- Top try scorer: League: Tom Stewart (16); All: Tom Stewart (17)
- Top points scorer: League: John Cooney (134); All: John Cooney (154)
Home colours	Away colours	Third colours

The 2022–23 season was Ulster Rugby's 29th season since the advent of professionalism in rugby union. They competed in the United Rugby Championship and the European Rugby Champions Cup. It was Dan McFarland's fifth season as head coach.

Ulster made a strong start to the URC season, going into the autumn international break second in the table, having beaten the Lions and Munster away and only lost to Leinster at home. Their away match against the Sharks was postponed after an outbreak of E.coli and norovirus. After comfortable win against Zebre, Ulster opened up a halftime lead away to Leinster, before the 14-man Leinster came back to win. There followed an abject 36–0 away defeat to Sale Sharks in the Champions Cup, after bad weather disrupted travel. The following week's home tie against La Rochelle was subject to a last-minute relocation to Dublin's Aviva Stadium, behind closed doors, because of a frozen pitch at Ravenhill. La Rochelle built up a 29–0 halftime lead, but Ulster recovered enough for a losing bonus point. After an away win against Connacht, Ulster lost to Munster and Benetton, lost to La Rochelle, and finally beat Sale and an under-strength Stormers at home, going into the Six Nations break third in the URC and in the round of 16 in the Champions Cup. After defeating the Sharks in the rearranged fixture, Ulster became the first European team in the URC to win all four fixtures against South African opposition by beating the Bulls at home. They lost their Champion's Cup knockout match against Leinster, but secured second spot in the URC table with five straight wins. That would have guaranteed a home semi-final had they won the quarter-final, but they lost it to Connacht.

Ulster's top scorer was scrum-half John Cooney with 154 points. Hooker Tom Stewart was top try scorer with 17 in all competitions, including a record 16 in the URC. He was named Ulster's player of the year, supporters club player of the season, and the URC Next-Gen Player of the Season. Stuart McCloskey was rugby writers' player of the season, and Stewart Moore was young player of the season. Lock Harry Sheridan and centre Jude Postlethwaite made their debuts this season. Hooker Rob Herring became the most-capped Ulster player, reaching 229 appearances for the province.

Ulster women finished last in the IRFU Women's Interprovincial Series. Centre Kelly McCormill was Ulster women's player of the year, and prop Sadhbh McGrath was young women's player of the year.

In the All-Ireland League, City of Armagh were promoted after topping Division 1B, Queen's University were promoted after topping Division 2A, and Instonians were promoted after topping Division 2C. Banbridge and Malone were both relegated from Division 1B. Ulster junior champions Clogher Valley were promoted to senior level after winning the provincial playoffs.

== Men's season ==
=== Personnel changes ===
Ulster appointed a new defence coach, Jonny Bell, returning to his home province from a spell at Worcester Warriors, in place of the departing Jared Payne.

New signings include Irish-qualified flanker Sean Reffell, from Saracens, lock Frank Bradshaw Ryan from French club Nevers, out-half Jake Flannery from Munster, former All-Black tighthead prop Jeffery Toomaga-Allen from Wasps, and fullback Shea O'Brien from City of Armagh RFC, on a development contract. Hooker Declan Moore, who was signed as temporary injury cover from Munster last season, made his move to Ulster permanent. Academy centre Jude Postlethwaite signed a development contract, to be upgraded to a full senior contract after a year.

After the collapse of Worcester Warriors, Scotland and Lions international loosehead prop Rory Sutherland joined until the end of the season.

Hooker Bradley Roberts, now a Wales international, left for the Dragons, prop Ross Kane and lock David O'Connor left for Ealing Trailfinders, and lock Mick Kearney, prop Jack McGrath and flanker Sean Reidy were released.

Five new players joined the academy: last season's Ulster Schools Player of the Year, Campbell College lock Joe Hopes; QUB flanker Lorcan McLaughlin; Cambridge House Grammar flanker James McNabney; Coleraine Grammar fullback Rory Telfer; and Wallace High School prop Scott Wilson.

=== Summer internationals ===
Seven Ulster players were selected for Ireland's tour to New Zealand: hooker Rob Herring, prop Tom O'Toole, locks Iain Henderson and Kieran Treadwell, flanker Nick Timoney, centres Stuart McCloskey and James Hume, and fullback Michael Lowry. Treadwell, Herring and O'Toole made test appearances. Hume, Timoney, Lowry and McCloskey appeared in non-test matches against the Māori All Blacks. Henderson injured his knee before the opening match, and Hume injured his groin in the opening match against the Māori All Blacks.

James McCormick, Adam McNamee, Reuben Crothers, Josh Hanlon, Charlie Irvine, Lorcan McLoughlin, James McNabney, Reece Malone, Scott Wilson and Joseph Mawhinney all appeared for Ireland U20s in the summer.

=== Pre-season friendlies ===
Ulster's pre-season campaign opened on 2 September with a home friendly against Exeter Chiefs, which they won 31–12. Jacob Stockdale scored a try on his return from injury, and new scrum-half Michael McDonald was named man of the match.

A second friendly, away to Glasgow Warriors, arranged for 9 September, was cancelled following the death of Queen Elizabeth II the day before.

=== Emerging Ireland tour ===
Ten Ulster players were selected for the Emerging Ireland tour to South Africa for the Toyota Challenge at the end of September: wings Robert Baloucoune and Ethan McIlroy; centre Stewart Moore; out-half Jake Flannery; scrum-halves Nathan Doak and Michael McDonald; loosehead prop Callum Reid; hooker Tom Stewart; lock Cormac Izuchukwu; and flanker David McCann.

=== Domestic season: first block ===
The team opened the season with a 36–10 home victory over Connacht in the URC. Hooker Tom Stewart made his first senior start, scored a try and was named Player of the Match. After a high-scoring away win against Scarlets, in which John Cooney scored 30 points, Ulster lost at home to Leinster in heavy rain. There followed a 47–17 win over Ospreys, in which Luke Marshall and Sam Carter scored two tries each. Ulster then became the first northern hemisphere team to win in South Africa this season, beating the Lions in Johannesburg. Their next match, against the Sharks in Durban, was postponed after an outbreak of E. coli and norovirus meant they were unable to field a team. Ulster narrowly beat Munster away, with Rory Sutherland making his debut and John Andrew making his 100th appearance for the province, both off the bench, and went into the international break second in the URC table.

=== Autumn international break ===
Eight Ulster players were called up to the Ireland squad for the 2022 end-of-year internationals: Robert Baloucoune, Rob Herring, Michael Lowry, Stuart McCloskey, Tom O'Toole, Jacob Stockdale, Nick Timoney and Kieran Treadwell. Two more, James Hume and Marty Moore, were selected for the panel for Ireland 'A' to play a New Zealand XV.

=== Domestic second block ===
After the international break, Ulster had a comfortable home win over Zebre Parma, with Tom Stewart scoring two tries. They then travelled to Leinster, and led the league leaders at half time, before Leinster fought back to win the game 38–29. This began a three-game losing streak, as Ulster lost their opening two games in the Champions Cup. After poor weather caused travel disruption, they capitulated 39–0 away to Sale Sharks. A frozen pitch at Ravenhill meant Ulster's home game against reigning champions La Rochelle had to be relocated to Dublin's Aviva Stadium at the last minute, with the match played behind closed doors. La Rochelle built a 29-0 half-time lead, but Ulster improved enough in the second half to earn two bonus points in a 29–36 defeat. Returning to the URC, Ulster halted their losing streak with a close away win against Connacht, featuring another two-try display from Tom Stewart. After last-minute defeats to Munster (during which flanker Sean Reffell made a URC record 42 tackles, and tighthead prop Marty Moore's season was ended by an anterior cruciate ligament injury) and Benetton in the URC and La Rochelle in the Champions Cup, Ulster secured qualification for the last 16 of the Champions Cup with a home win over Sale. They reached the Six Nations break with a bonus point home win against the Stormers, sitting at third in the URC table and second in the Irish shield.

Academy lock Harry Sheridan made his senior debut in the away defeat to La Rochelle.

=== Six Nations international break ===
Five Ulster players were called up to the initial Ireland squad for the 2023 Six Nations Championship: Iain Henderson, Rob Herring, Tom O'Toole, Stuart McCloskey and Jacob Stockdale. Tom Stewart was later added to the squad as cover for the injured Ronan Kelleher, Nick Timoney was added to the squad ahead of the fourth match against Scotland, and Kieran Treadwell was called up for the fifth match against England.

James McNabney, Rory Telfer and Joe Hopes all featured for Ireland in the U20 Six Nations.

During the Six Nations, Ulster played three away games, losing to Glasgow Warriors, before travelling to Durban to defeat the Sharks in a fixture rearranged from October, and then defeating Cardiff. This left Ulster in third.

Centre Jude Postlethwaite made his senior debut in the away win against Cardiff.

=== Domestic season: third block ===
Ulster finished the URC regular season with three home games. In the first of these three, they defeated the Bulls, with Tom Stewart scoring a hat-trick. This result made them the first European team in the URC to beat all four South African sides in the same season. The following week they went out of the Champions Cup in the round of 16, losing 30–15 to Leinster at the Aviva Stadium. Back in the URC, they moved into second with a bonus point win against the Dragons 40–21, with Tom Stewart scoring another hat-trick. The following week they secured second place with a home win over Edinburgh, earning a home quarter-final against Connacht, which they lost 10–15. Wing Jacob Stockdale made his 100th appearance for the province, and hooker Rob Herring equalled the all-time appearance record with 229, alongside Andrew Trimble and Darren Cave.

== Women's season ==
Ulster finished bottom of the IRFU Women's Interprovincial Series, losing all their matches.

The inaugural Celtic Challenge was held in January and February 2023. Ireland entered a Combined Provinces XV, which finished top of the table. Ulster players selected were Sophie Barrett, India Daley, Ella Durkan, Brittany Hogan, Maeve Nuala Liston, Kelly McCormill, Sadhbh McGrath, Rachel McIlroy, Stacey Sloan and Fiona Tuite.

== Awards ==
=== Ulster Rugby Awards ===
The 2023 Ulster Rugby Awards were announced online on 1 June. Winners were:

==== Men's and boys' awards ====
- Men's player of the year: Tom Stewart
- Supporters' club player of the year: Tom Stewart
- Rugby writers' player of the year: Stuart McCloskey
- Young men's player of the year: Stewart Moore
- Boys' youth player of the year: Ben Neely, Coleraine RFC
- Boys schools' player of the year: Jacob Boyd, RBAI

==== Women's and girls' awards ====
- Women's player of the year: Kelly McCormill, Cooke RFC
- Young women's player of the year: Sadhbh McGrath, Cooke RFC
- U18 girls' player of the year: Ruby Starrett, Larne RFC
- Girls schools' player of the year: Scarlett Keys, Enniskillen Royal Grammar School

==== Club & community awards ====
- Club player of the year: George Pringle, Ballynahinch RFC
- Referee of the year: Peter Martin

=== URC awards ===
Tom Stewart was the URC's Top Try Scorer with 16, a record for the competition - beating the 14 scored by Edinburgh's Tim Visser in 2010-11 and the Cheetahs' Rabz Maxwane in 2018-19, and the Next-Gen Player of the Season award for players under 23 who have fewer than five international caps.

== Men's personnel ==
=== Staff ===
Position	Name	Nationality
Chief executive officer	Jonny Petrie	Scotland
Operations director	Bryn Cunningham	Ireland
Head coach	Dan McFarland	England
Assistant coach	Dan Soper	New Zealand
Defence coach	Jonny Bell	Ireland
Forwards coach	Roddy Grant	Scotland
Skills coach	Craig Newby	New Zealand
Academy manager	Gavin Hogg	Ireland
Elite performance development officer	Willie Faloon	Ireland
Elite performance development officer	Neil Doak	Ireland

=== Senior squad ===
==== Players in ====
- (Ireland) Frank Bradshaw Ryan from (France) Nevers
- (Ireland) Jake Flannery from (Ireland) Munster
- (Ireland) Michael McDonald from (Australia) Western Force
- (Ireland) Shea O'Brien from (Ireland) City of Armagh
- (England) Sean Reffell from (England) Saracens
- (Scotland) Rory Sutherland from (England) Worcester Warriors
- (New Zealand) Jeffery Toomaga-Allen from (England) Wasps

==== Promoted from academy ====
- (Ireland) Jude Postlethwaite

==== Players out ====
- (Ireland) Ross Kane to (England) Ealing Trailfinders
- (Ireland) Mick Kearney retired
- (Ireland) Jack McGrath retired
- (Ireland) David O'Connor to (England) Ealing Trailfinders
- (Ireland) Sean Reidy released
- (Wales) Bradley Roberts to (Wales) Dragons

Ulster Rugby squad (Note: Taking into account signings and departures head of 2021–22 season as listed on List of 2022–23 United Rugby Championship transfers.)
**Props**: (New Zealand) **Jeffery Toomaga-Allen** (14 apps, 10 starts, 5 pts); (Ireland) **Marty Moore** (12 apps, 10 starts, 5 pts); (Ireland) Andrew Warwick (16 apps, 8 starts); (Scotland) **Rory Sutherland** (12 apps, 8 starts); (Ireland) **Eric O'Sullivan** (13 apps, 6 starts, 5 pts); (Ireland) **Tom O'Toole** (9 apps, 4 starts, 5 pts); (South Africa) Gareth Milasinovich* (10 apps, 1 start); (Ireland) Callum Reid (6 apps, 1 start, 10 pts); **Hookers**: (Ireland) Tom Stewart (19 apps, 12 starts, 85 pts, 1 (yellow card) ); (Ireland) **Rob Herring** (13 apps, 10 starts, 25 pts); (Ireland) John Andrew (14 apps, 2 start, 15 pts); (Australia) Declan Moore* (2 apps); **Locks**: (Ireland) Alan O'Connor (22 apps, 19 starts, 10 pts); (Ireland) **Kieran Treadwell** (17 apps, 13 starts, 5 pts); (Australia) **Sam Carter** (19 apps, 9 starts, 15 pts, 1 (yellow card) ); (Ireland) **Iain Henderson** (c) (7 apps, 6 starts, 5 pts, 1 (yellow card) ); (Ireland) Cormac Izuchukwu (6 apps, 1 start, 1 (yellow card) ); (Ireland) Frank Bradshaw Ryan (1 app)	**Back row**: (Ireland) **Nick Timoney** (20 apps, 18 starts, 15 pts, 1 (yellow card) ); (South Africa) **Duane Vermeulen** (18 apps, 16 starts, 10 pts, 1 (yellow card) ); (Ireland) David McCann (14 apps, 10 starts, 5 pts); (Ireland) Marcus Rea (12 apps, 9 starts, 10 pts); (Ireland) Matty Rea (7 apps, 5 starts, 5 pts); (Ireland) Harry Sheridan (9 apps, 4 starts, 10 pts, 1 (yellow card) ); (Ireland) **Jordi Murphy** (9 apps, 4 starts, 5 pts); (Ireland) Greg Jones (5 apps, 2 starts, 1 (yellow card) ); (England) Sean Reffell* (3 apps, 2 starts); **Scrum-halves**: (Ireland) **John Cooney** (19 apps, 14 starts, 154 pts); (Ireland) Nathan Doak (20 apps, 12 starts, 80 pts, 2 (yellow card) ); (Ireland) David Shanahan (6 apps); (Ireland) Michael McDonald (1 app); **Fly-halves**: (Ireland) **Billy Burns** (20 apps, 19 starts, 15 pts); (Ireland) **Ian Madigan** (4 apps, 2 starts); (Ireland) Jake Flannery (3 apps, 2 start)	**Centres**: (Ireland) **Stuart McCloskey** (15 apps, 15 starts, 10 pts); (Ireland) **James Hume** (14 apps, 14 starts, 10 pts, 2 (yellow card) ); (Ireland) **Luke Marshall** (14 apps, 12 starts, 15 pts); (Zimbabwe) Angus Curtis* (5 apps); (Ireland) Jude Postlethwaite (2 apps); **Wings**: (Ireland) **Jacob Stockdale** (18 apps, 17 starts, 10 pts); (Ireland) **Robert Baloucoune** (8 apps, 8 starts, 15 pts); (Ireland) Ethan McIlroy (14 apps, 7 starts, 5 pts); (Ireland) Rob Lyttle (7 apps, 7 starts, 15 pts); (Ireland) Ben Moxham (10 apps, 4 starts, 5 pts); (Ireland) **Craig Gilroy** (8 apps, 3 starts); (Ireland) Aaron Sexton (5 apps, 3 starts); **Fullbacks**: (Ireland) **Michael Lowry** (19 apps, 19 starts, 10 pts); (Ireland) Stewart Moore (20 apps, 11 starts, 20 pts); (Ireland) **Will Addison** (no apps); (Ireland) Shea O'Brien (no apps)
(c) denotes the team captain, **Bold** denotes internationally capped players. Italics denotes academy players who appeared in the senior team.^{*} denotes players qualified to play for Ireland on residency or dual nationality.^{ST} denotes a short-term signing.

=== Academy squad ===
==== Players in ====
- (Ireland) Joe Hopes from (Ireland) Regent House
- (Ireland) Lorcan McLoughlin from (Ireland) QUB
- (Ireland) James McNabney from (Ireland) Cambridge House
- (Ireland) Rory Telfer from (Ireland) Coleraine Grammar School
- (Ireland) Scott Wilson from (Ireland) Wallace High School.

==== Players out ====
- (Ireland) Lewis Finlay to (England) Ampthill
- (Ireland) Azur Allison
- (Ireland) Conor Rankin to (England) Ampthill

Ulster Rugby academy squad
**Props**: (Ireland) George Saunderson **(2)**; (Ireland) Scott Wilson **(1)**; **Hookers**: (Ireland) James McCormick **(3)**; **Locks**: (Ireland) Joe Hopes **(1)**; (Ireland) Harry Sheridan **(2)**	**Back row**: (Ireland) Reuben Crothers **(3)**; (Ireland) Lorcan McLoughlin **(1)**; (Ireland) James McNabney **(1)**; **Scrum-halves**: (Ireland) Conor McKee **(2)**; **Fly-halves**: (Ireland) James Humphreys **(2)**	**Centres**: (Ireland) Ben Carson **(3)**; **Wings**: None currently named; **Fullbacks**: (Ireland) Rory Telfer **(1)**
Number in brackets indicates players stage in the three-year academy cycle.^{*} denotes players qualified to play for Ireland on residency or dual nationality. Players and their allocated positions from the Ulster Rugby website.

== Men's competitions and results ==
=== Season record ===
Competition	Played	Won	Drawn	Lost	PF	PA	PD	TF	TA
2022-23 Champions Cup	5	1	0	4	69	123	-54	9	14
2022-23 URC	19	13	0	6	564	393	174	80	45
Total	24	14	0	10	633	516	117	89	59

=== Home attendance ===
Domestic League					European Cup					Total	
League	Fixtures	Average Attendance	Highest	Lowest	League	Fixtures	Average Attendance	Highest	Lowest	Total Attendance	Average Attendance
2022–23 United Rugby Championship	10	13,413	16,741	10,858	2022–23 European Rugby Champions Cup	1	18,196	18,196	18,196	152,330	13,848

=== 2022–23 United Rugby Championship ===
2022–23 United Rugby Championship
	Team	P	W	D	L	PF	PA	PD	TF	TA	Try bonus	Losing bonus	Pts
1	(Ireland) Leinster	18	16	1	1	580	363	+217	82	42	13	0	79
2	(Ireland) Ulster	18	13	0	5	554	378	+176	79	45	12	4	68
3	(South Africa) Stormers (RU)	18	12	2	4	531	391	+140	69	48	13	3	68
4	(Scotland) Glasgow Warriors	18	13	0	5	498	403	+95	72	53	11	0	63
5	(Ireland) Munster (CH)	18	10	1	7	470	357	+113	61	43	9	4	55
6	(South Africa) Bulls	18	10	0	8	613	448	+165	78	52	11	2	53
7	(Ireland) Connacht	18	10	0	8	456	426	+30	64	58	7	3	50
8	(South Africa) Sharks	18	9	1	8	486	480	+6	63	61	8	2	48
9	(South Africa) Lions	18	9	0	9	454	538	–84	55	75	7	2	45
10	(Wales) Cardiff	18	9	0	9	425	470	–45	52	64	6	2	44
11	(Italy) Benetton	18	8	0	10	440	533	–93	56	74	8	1	41
12	(Scotland) Edinburgh	18	6	0	12	466	467	–1	70	62	8	6	38
13	(Wales) Ospreys	18	5	2	11	400	514	–114	52	70	6	5	35
14	(Wales) Scarlets	18	6	1	11	435	506	–71	55	65	5	3	34
15	(Wales) Dragons	18	4	0	14	391	534	–143	46	70	5	3	24
16	(Italy) Zebre Parma	18	0	0	18	343	734	–391	50	105	6	5	11
If teams are level at any stage, tiebreakers are applied in the following order: 1. number of matches won; 2. the difference between points for and points against; 3. the number of tries scored; 4. the most points scored; 5. the difference between tries for and tries against; 6. the fewest red cards received; 7. the fewest yellow cards received.
Green background indicates teams that are playoff places that top their regional pools and earn a place in the 2023–24 European Champions Cup Blue background indicates teams that did not top their regional pool but are in play-off places and earn a place in the 2023–24 European Champions Cup; Pink background indicates teams that did not top their regional pool but are in play-off places, and earn a place in the 2023–24 European Challenge Cup; Yellow background indicates teams that top their regional pool and thus currently in a qualification place in the 2023–24 European Champions Cup, but are not in a play-off place Plain background indicates teams that earn a place in the 2023–24 European Challenge Cup. Q: qualified for play-offs. H: home field advantage secured for quarter-and semi-final. h; home field advantage secured for quarter-final X: cannot reach play-offs. E: qualified for Champions Cup.

1. 17 September 2022	(1 BP) Ulster (Ireland)	36-10	(Ireland) Connacht	Ravenhill Stadium, Belfast
19:35	Try: Marshall 27'; Stewart 37'; N. Doak 50'; S. Moore 63'; Reid 75'; Con: N. Doak (4) 28' 38' 52' 76'; Pen: N. Doak 44'	Report; Match Centre; Highlights; Player of the Match: Tom Stewart	Try: Blade 70'; Con: Hawkshaw 71'; Pen: Fitzgerald 41'; Cards: Boyle (yellow card) 63'	Attendance: 10,858; Referee: Eoghan Cross
Ulster lineup: 1. Eric O'Sullivan, 2. Tom Stewart, 3. Marty Moore, 4. Alan O'Connor (c), 5. Sam Carter, 6. Matty Rea, 7. Marcus Rea, 8. David McCann, 9. Nathan Doak, 10. Billy Burns, 11. Jacob Stockdale, 12. Stuart McCloskey, 13. Luke Marshall, 14. Robert Baloucoune, 15. Stewart Moore.; Replacements: 16. John Andrew (for Stewart 60'), 17. Callum Reid (for O'Sullivan 58'), 18. Jeffery Toomaga-Allen (for M. Moore 5'), 19. Cormac Izuchukwu (for Carter 58'), 20. Jordi Murphy (for McCann 58'), 21. David Shanahan (for Burns 65'), 22. Angus Curtis (for McCloskey 53'), 23. Aaron Sexton (for Baloucoune 77').; URC Fantasy Team of the Week: Tom Stewart, Luke Marshall, Stewart Moore. RTÉ Team of the Week: Tom Stewart, Marty Moore, Nathan Doak, Stewart Moore.				Attendance: 10,858; Referee: Eoghan Cross

2. 24 September 2022	Scarlets (Wales)	39-55	(Ireland) Ulster (1 BP)	Parc y Scarlets, Llanelli
13:00	Try: J. Davies 16'; Conbeer 20'; Fifita 41'; D. Hughes (2) 54' 62'; Con: Costelow (3) 19' 42' 54'; Patchell 63'; Pen: Costelow 24'; Patchell 67'; Cards: Costlow (yellow card) 33'; Vaea Fifita (yellow card) 74'	Report; Match centre Highlights; Player of the Match: John Cooney	Try: O'Connor 5'; M. Moore 14'; Cooney (2) 33' 57'; Marcus Rea 41'; Burns 48'; O'Toole 77'; Con: Cooney (7) 6' 15' 34' 42' 49' 58' 78'; Pen: Cooney (2) 43' 74'	Attendance: 6,171; Referee: AJ Jacobs
Ulster lineup: 1. Andrew Warwick, 2. Rob Herring, 3. Marty Moore, 4. Alan O'Connor (c), 5. Kieran Treadwell, 6. Matty Rea, 7. Marcus Rea, 8. Nick Timoney, 9. John Cooney, 10. Billy Burns, 11. Jacob Stockdale, 12. Stuart McCloskey, 13. Luke Marshall, 14. Aaron Sexton, 15. Michael Lowry.; Replacements: 16. Declan Moore (for Reffell, 68'), 17. Eric O'Sullivan (for Warwick, 46'), 18. Tom O'Toole (for M. Moore, 22'), 19. Sam Carter (for Treadwell, 54'), 20. Sean Reffell (for Marcus Rea, 58'), 21. David Shanahan (for Cooney, 79'), 22. Angus Curtis (for Marshall, 58'), 23. Craig Gilroy (for Sexton, 32').; URC Fantasy Team of the Week: John Cooney, Michael Lowry. RTÉ Team of the Week: John Cooney, Stuart McCloskey, Michael Lowry.				Attendance: 6,171; Referee: AJ Jacobs

3. 30 September 2022	(1 BP) Ulster (Ireland)	13–20	(Ireland) Leinster	Ravenhill Stadium, Belfast
19:35	Try: Andrew 61'; Con: Cooney 63'; Pen: Cooney (2) 18' 72'	Report; Match centre	Try: Baird 7'; Sheehan; Con: R. Byrne (2) 9' 22'; Pen: R. Byrne (2) 36' 45'; Cards: J. O'Brien (yellow card) 62'	Attendance: 14,477; Referee: Andrew Brace
Ulster lineup: 1. Andrew Warwick, 2. Rob Herring, 3. Tom O'Toole, 4. Alan O'Connor (c), 5. Kieran Treadwell, 6. Matty Rea, 7. Marcus Rea, 8. Nick Timoney, 9. John Cooney, 10. Billy Burns, 11. Jacob Stockdale, 12. Stuart McCloskey, 13. Luke Marshall, 14. Aaron Sexton, 15. Michael Lowry.; Replacements: 16. John Andrew (for Herring, 22'), 17. Eric O'Sullivan (for Warwick, 58'), 18. Marty Moore (for O'Toole, 58'), 19. Sam Carter (for Treadwell, 63'), 20. Greg Jones (for Matty Rea, 58'), 21. David Shanahan (for Cooney, 72'), 22. Angus Curtis (for Marshall, 72'), 23. Ben Moxham (for Stockdale, 40').				Attendance: 14,477; Referee: Andrew Brace

4. 8 October 2022	(1 BP) Ulster (Ireland)	47-17	(Wales) Ospreys	Ravenhill Stadium, Belfast
19:35	Try: Marshall (2) 1' 33'; Andrew 7'; Carter (2) 22' 64'; McCloskey 41'; Marcus Rea 75'; Con: Cooney (6) 2' 8' 23' 34' 66' 76'	Report; Match centre Player of the Match: Luke Marshall	Try: J. Morgan 12'; Morris 82'; Con: Walsh (2) 13' 82'; Pen: Walsh 27'	Attendance: 11,517; Referee: Ben Blain
Ulster lineup: 1. Eric O'Sullivan, 2. John Andrew, 3. Marty Moore, 4. Alan O'Connor (c), 5. Sam Carter, 6. Nick Timoney, 7. Jordi Murphy, 8. Duane Vermeulen, 9. John Cooney, 10. Ian Madigan, 11. Rob Lyttle, 12. Stuart McCloskey, 13. Luke Marshall, 14. Craig Gilroy, 15. Michael Lowry.; Replacements: 16. Declan Moore (for Andrew 77'), 17. Andrew Warwick (for O'Sullivan 52'), 18. Tom O'Toole (for M. Moore 11'), 19. Frank Bradshaw Ryan (for O'Connor 52'), 20. Marcus Rea (for Vermeulen 61'), 21. David Shanahan (for Burns 61'), 22. Billy Burns (for Madigan 40'), 23. Aaron Sexton (for McCloskey 44').; URC Fantasy Team of the Week: Sam Carter, Nick Timoney. RTÉ Team of the Week: Sam Carter, Nick Timoney, Luke Marshall, Michael Lowry				Attendance: 11,517; Referee: Ben Blain

5. 15 October 2022	(2 BP) Lions (South Africa)	37–39	(Ireland) Ulster (1 BP)	Ellis Park Stadium, Johannesburg
	Try: F. Horn (2) 16' 76'; Tshituka 32'; Coetzee 61'; Q. Horn 65'; Con: Lombard 17'; Hendrikse (2) 66' 77'; Pen: Lombard (2) 7' 26'; Cards: Van Wyk (yellow card) 39'	Report; Match centre Highlights; Player of the Match: Michael Lowry	Try: Baloucoune 1'; Burns 39'; Lyttle 41'; McCloskey 46'; Herring 52'; Con: Cooney (3) 2' 42' 47'; N. Doak 53'; Pen: Cooney 9'; N. Doak 74'	Attendance: 5,419; Referee: Ben Blain
Ulster lineup: 1. Eric O'Sullivan, 2. Rob Herring, 3. Gareth Milasinovich, 4. Alan O'Connor (c), 5. Sam Carter, 6. David McCann, 7. Marcus Rea, 8. Duane Vermeulen, 9. John Cooney, 10. Billy Burns, 11. Rob Lyttle, 12. Stuart McCloskey, 13. Luke Marshall, 14. Robert Baloucoune, 15. Michael Lowry.; Replacements: 16. John Andrew (for Herring 57'), 17. Callum Reid (for O'Sullivan 57'), 18. Tom O'Toole (for Milasinovich 24'), 19. Cormac Izuchukwu (for Carter 66'), 20. Nick Timoney (for McCann 50'), 21. Nathan Doak (for Cooney 50'), 22. Stewart Moore (for Marshall 75'), 23. Ethan McIlroy (for Baloucoune 57').; URC Fantasy Team of the Week: Stuart McCloskey. RTÉ Team of the Week: Rob Herring, Stuart McCloskey, Michael Lowry				Attendance: 5,419; Referee: Ben Blain

7. 29 October 2022	(1 BP) Munster (Ireland)	14-15	(Ireland) Ulster	Thomond Park, Limerick
17:15	Try: S. Daly 66'; Pen: Crowley (3) 9' 48' 53'; Cards: Fekitoa (yellow card) 39'	Report; Match centre Highlights; Player of the Match: Marty Moore	Try: Murphy 4'; Stewart 13'; Hume 41'; Cards: Izuchukwu (yellow card) 63'	Attendance: 15,260; Referee: Frank Murphy
Ulster lineup: 1. Andrew Warwick, 2. Tom Stewart, 3. Marty Moore, 4. Alan O'Connor (c), 5. Sam Carter, 6. David McCann, 7. Jordi Murphy, 8. Duane Vermeulen, 9. Nathan Doak, 10. Billy Burns, 11. Ethan McIlroy, 12. Luke Marshall, 13. James Hume, 14. Ben Moxham, 15. Stewart Moore.; Replacements: 16. John Andrew (for Stewart 60'), 17. Rory Sutherland (for Warwick 41'), 18. Gareth Milasinovich, 19. Cormac Izuchukwu (for Carter 53'), 20. Matty Rea (for McCann 52'), 21. John Cooney (for Doak 43'), 22. Angus Curtis (for Marshall 41'), 23. Craig Gilroy.; URC Fantasy Team of the Week: Tom Stewart; RTÉ Team of the Week: Tom Stewart, Marty Moore, Alan O'Connor, James Hume				Attendance: 15,260; Referee: Frank Murphy

8. 25 November 2022	Ulster (Ireland)	36-15	(Italy) Zebre Parma	Ravenhill Stadium, Belfast
19:35	Try: Stewart (2) 4' 52'; Matty Rea 8'; Reid 35'; S. Moore; Andrew 65'; Con: N. Doak (3) 9' 36' 42'; Cards: Carter (yellow card) 30'; N. Doak (yellow card) 43'	Report; Match centre Player of the Match: Tom Stewart	Try: Pani 30'; Cronjé 80'; Con: Prisciantelli 81'; Pen: Prisciantelli 13'	Attendance: 16,741; Referee: AJ Jacobs
Ulster lineup: 1. Callum Reid, 2. Tom Stewart, 3. Marty Moore, 4. Cormac Izuchukwu, 5. Sam Carter, 6. Matty Rea, 7. Marcus Rea, 8. Duane Vermeulen (c), 9. Nathan Doak, 10. Jake Flannery, 11. Jacob Stockdale, 12. Luke Marshall, 13. James Hume, 14. Ethan McIlroy, 15. Stewart Moore.; Replacements: 16. John Andrew (for Stewart, 61'), 17. Andrew Warwick (for Reid, 61'), 18. Jeffery Toomaga-Allen (for M. Moore, 40'), 19. Iain Henderson (for Izuchukwu 52'), 20. David McCann (for Matty Rea 54'), 21. Michael McDonald (for Flannery, 61'), 22. Angus Curtis (for Marshall 64'), 23. Ben Moxham (For Stockdale 77').; URC Fantasy Team of the Week: Tom Stewart. RTÉ Team of the Week: Tom Stewart, Stewart Moore				Attendance: 16,741; Referee: AJ Jacobs

9. 3 December 2022	(1 BP) Leinster (Ireland)	38-29	(Ireland) Ulster (1 BP)	RDS Arena, Dublin
19:35	Try: Kelleher 40'; Ringrose (2) 58' 63'; Porter 73'; Lowe 75'; Con: R. Byrne (5) 42' 59' 63' 73' 76'; Pen: R. Byrne 2'	Report; Match centre	Try: Herring 21'; Treadwell 28'; McIlroy 34'; Carter 79'; Con: Cooney (2) 22' 29'; Nathan Doak 80'; Pen: Cooney 9'; Cards: Hume (yellow card) 60'; Timoney (yellow card) 63'	Attendance: 15,990; Referee: Christophe Ridley
Ulster lineup: 1. Andrew Warwick, 2. Tom Stewart, 3. Marty Moore, 4. Alan O'Connor, 5. Kieran Treadwell, 6. Iain Henderson (c), 7. Marcus Rea, 8. Nick Timoney, 9. John Cooney, 10. Billy Burns, 11. Ethan McIlroy, 12. Stuart McCloskey, 13. James Hume, 14. Stewart Moore, 15. Michael Lowry.; Replacements: 16. Rob Herring (for Stewart 20'), 17. Callum Reid (for Warwick 73'), 18. Tom O'Toole (for M. Moore 52'), 19. Sam Carter (for Treadwell 52'), 20. Duane Vermeulen (for Henderson 56'), 21. Nathan Doak (for Cooney 44'), 22. Jacob Stockdale (for Hume 70'), 23. Matty Rea (for Timoney 73').				Attendance: 15,990; Referee: Christophe Ridley

10. 23 December 2022	(1 BP) Connacht (Ireland)	20-22	(Ireland) Ulster	The Sportsground, Galway
17:35	Try: Blade 59'; Butler 78'; Byrne 84'; Con: Carty 78'; Pen: Carty 34'	Report; Match centre Player of the Match: Tom Stewart	Try: Lyttle 29'; Stewart (2) 44', 53'; Con: Cooney (2) 45', 54'; Pen: Cooney 71'; Cards: Jones (yellow card) 77'	Attendance: 6,041; Referee: Frank Murphy
Ulster lineup: 1. Rory Sutherland, 2. Tom Stewart, 3. Marty Moore, 4. Alan O'Connor, 5. Iain Henderson (c), 6. David McCann, 7. Marcus Rea, 8. Nick Timoney, 9. John Cooney, 10. Nathan Doak, 11. Rob Lyttle, 12. Stuart McCloskey, 13. Luke Marshall, 14. Ethan McIlroy, 15. Michael Lowry.; Replacements: 16. John Andrew (for Stewart 80'), 17. Eric O'Sullivan (for Sutherland 65'), 18. Gareth Milsinovich (for M. Moore 51'), 19. Sam Carter (for O'Connor 52'), 20. Greg Jones (for McCann 57'), 21. David Shanahan (for Cooney 81'), 22. Jake Flannery (for Marshall 81'), 23. Stewart Moore (for Lowry 40').				Attendance: 6,041; Referee: Frank Murphy

11. 1 January 2023	(1 BP) Ulster (Ireland)	14-15	(Ireland) Munster	Ravenhill Stadium, Belfast
17:15	Try: Baloucoune 67'; Pen: Cooney (3) 15' 19' 24'; Cards: Stewart (yellow card) 35'	Report; Match centre	Try: Patterson 44'; Healy 79'; Con: Healy 80'; Pen: Healy 73'	Attendance: 16,672
Ulster lineup: 1. Rory Sutherland, 2. Tom Stewart, 3. Marty Moore, 4. Kieran Treadwell, 5. Iain Henderson (c), 6. Greg Jones, 7. Sean Reffell, 8. Duane Vermeulen, 9. John Cooney, 10. Billy Burns, 11. Jacob Stockdale, 12. Stuart McCloskey, 13. James Hume, 14. Robert Baloucoune, 15. Stewart Moore.; Replacements: 16. John Andrew (for S. Moore 35-45', for Stewart 76'), 17. Eric O'Sullivan (for Sutherland 65'), 18. Gareth Milsinovich (for M. Moore 29'), 19. Sam Carter (for Treadwell 62'), 20. Jordi Murphy (for Jones 65'), 21. Nathan Doak (for Cooney 62'), 22. Jake Flannery (for Burns 72'), 23. Ethan McIlroy (for Stockdale 76').				Attendance: 16,672

12. 7 January 2023	Benetton (Italy)	31-29	(Ireland) Ulster (2 BP)	Stadio Comunale di Monigo, Treviso
	Try: Albornoz 13'; Ratave 18'; Brex 63'; Con: Albornoz (2) 14' 19'; Pen: Albornoz 36'; Smith (2) 59' 77'; Drop: Albornoz 42'; Cards: Pettinelli (yellow card) 75'	Report; Match centre	Try: O'Sullivan 8'; Herring 54'; Lowry 67'; Penalty try 74'; Con: Cooney (2) 9' 68'; Pen: Cooney 40'	Attendance: 4,218; Referee: Ben Whitehouse
Ulster lineup: 1. Eric O'Sullivan, 2. Rob Herring, 3. Jeff Toomaga-Allen, 4. Kieran Treadwell, 5. Iain Henderson (c), 6. Greg Jones, 7. Sean Reffell, 8. Nick Timoney, 9. John Cooney, 10. Billy Burns, 11. Jacob Stockdale, 12. Stuart McCloskey, 13. James Hume, 14. Robert Baloucoune, 15. Michael Lowry.; Replacements: 16. Tom Stewart (for Herring 56'), 17. Rory Sutherland (for O'Sullivan 56'), 18. Andrew Warwick (for Reffell 68'), 19. Alan O'Connor (for Henderson 49'), 20. Duane Vermeulen (for Jones 49'), 21. Nathan Doak (for Burns 74'), 22. Stewart Moore (for Hume 49'), 23. Ethan McIlroy (for Stockdale 74').				Attendance: 4,218; Referee: Ben Whitehouse

13. 27 January 2023	(1 BP) Ulster (Ireland)	35-5	(South Africa) Stormers	Ravenhill Stadium, Belfast
19:35	Try: N. Doak 13'; Moxham 20'; Timoney 41'; Toomaga-Allen 45'; Lowry 56'; Con: N. Doak (4) 14' 21' 42' 46'; Cooney 57'	Report; Match centre Player of the Match: Jeffery Toomaga-Allen	Try: Venter 76'; Cards: Dixon (yellow card) 44'	Attendance: 12,216; Referee: Ian Adamson
Ulster lineup: 1. Eric O'Sullivan, 2. Tom Stewart, 3. Jeff Toomaga-Allen, 4. Alan O'Connor (c), 5. Sam Carter, 6. Harry Sheridan, 7. Nick Timoney, 8. Duane Vermeulen, 9. Nathan Doak, 10. Billy Burns, 11. Ben Moxham, 12. Stewart Moore, 13. James Hume, 14. Rob Lyttle, 15. Michael Lowry.; Replacements: 16. John Andrew (for Stewart 52'), 17. Rory Sutherland (for O'Sullivan 54'), 18. Andrew Warwick (for Toomaga-Allen 64'), 19. Kieran Treadwell (for Carter 52'), 20. Jordi Murphy (for Sheridan 54'), 21. John Cooney (for Doak 52'), 22. Ian Madigan (for Burns 70'), 23. Ethan McIlroy (for Lyttle 57').				Attendance: 12,216; Referee: Ian Adamson

14. 17 February 2023	Glasgow Warriors (Scotland)	17-11	(Ireland) Ulster (1 BP)	Scotstoun Stadium, Glasgow
17:35	Try: Valianu 17'; Dempsey 63'; F. Brown 74'; Con: Weir 76'	Report; Match centre	Try: Sheridan 28'; Pen: N. Doak 41'; Cooney 82'	Attendance: 7,338; Referee: Craig Evans
Ulster lineup: 1. Eric O'Sullivan, 2. Tom Stewart, 3. Jeff Toomaga-Allen, 4. Alan O'Connor (c), 5. Kieran Treadwell, 6. Harry Sheridan, 7. Jordi Murphy, 8. Nick Timoney, 9. Nathan Doak, 10. Billy Burns, 11. Jacob Stockdale, 12. Stewart Moore, 13. James Hume, 14. Ben Moxham, 15. Ethan McIlroy.; Replacements: 16. John Andrew (for Stewart 61'), 17. Rory Sutherland (for O'Sullivan 45'), 18. Andrew Warwick (for Toomaga-Allen 67'), 19. Cormac Izuchukwu (for O'Connor 67'), 20. Greg Jones (for Timoney 61'), 21. John Cooney (for Doak 50'), 22. Luke Marshall (for Hume 76'), 23. Craig Gilroy (for Moxham 57').				Attendance: 7,338; Referee: Craig Evans

6. 25 February 2023	(2 BP) Sharks (South Africa)	24-31	(Ireland) Ulster (1 BP)	Kings Park Stadium, Durban
12:00	Try: Williams 1'; Abrahams 29'; N. Mchunu 51'; Chamberlain 67'; Con: Bosch (2) 30' 51'	Postponed from 22 October 2022 due to illness Report; Match centre Player of the Match: John Cooney	Try: Stewart (2) 24' 32'; S. Moore 43'; Sheridan 56'; Con: Cooney (4) 25' 33' 44' 58'; Pen: Cooney 18'	Attendance: 13,212; Referee: Sam Grove-White
Ulster lineup: 1. Rory Sutherland, 2. John Andrew, 3. Jeff Toomaga-Allen, 4. Alan O'Connor, 5. Harry Sherridan, 6. Jordi Murphy, 7. Nick Timoney, 8. Duane Vermeulen (c), 9. John Cooney, 10. Jake Flannery, 11. Aaron Sexton, 12. Stewart Moore, 13. Luke Marshall, 14. Craig Gilroy, 15. Michael Lowry.; Replacements: 16. Tom Stewart (for Andrew 3'), 17. Andrew Warwick (for Sutherland 65'), 18. Gareth Milasinovich (for Toomaga-Allen 65'), 19. Cormac Izuchukwu (for O'Connor 76-78', for Vermeulen 78'), 20. David McCann (for Murphy 59'), 21. David Shanahan, 22. Ian Madigan (for Flannery 59'), 23. Ethan McIlroy (for Gilroy 37').				Attendance: 13,212; Referee: Sam Grove-White

15. 4 March 2023	Cardiff (Wales)	20-42	(Ireland) Ulster (1 BP)	Cardiff Arms Park
	Try: Lane (2) 6' 62'; Summerhill 66'; Con: Evans 67'; Pen: Evans 16'	Report; Match centre Player of the Match: Nathan Doak	Try: S. Moore 1'; Stockdale 18'; N. Doak 24'; Burns 51'; Stewart (2) 60' 72'; Con: N. Doak (6) 2' 19' 25' 52' 61' 73'	Attendance: 6,728; Referee: Hollie Davidson
Ulster lineup: 1. Rory Sutherland, 2. Rob Herring (c), 3. Jeffery Toomaga-Allen, 4. Kieran Treadwell, 5. Sam Carter, 6. David McCann, 7. Marcus Rea, 8. Nick Timoney, 9. Nathan Doak, 10. Billy Burns, 11. Jacob Stockdale, 12. Stewart Moore, 13. James Hume, 14. Ben Moxham, 15. Michael Lowry.; Replacements: 16. Tom Stewart (for Herring 58'), 17. Callum Reid (for Sutherland 58'), 18. Gareth Milasinovich (for Toomaga-Allen 68'), 19. Alan O'Connor (for Carter 49'), 20. Harry Sheridan (for Treadwell 72'), 21. John Cooney, 22. Jude Postlethwaite (for Hume 59'), 23. Ethan McIlroy (for Stockdale 62').				Attendance: 6,728; Referee: Hollie Davidson

16. 25 March 2023	(1 BP) Ulster (Ireland)	32-23	(South Africa) Bulls	Ravenhill Stadium, Belfast
	Try: Baloucoune 2'; Stewart (3) 25' 42' 54'; Con: N. Doak (3) 26' 43' 54'; Pen: N. Doak 72'; Cooney 79'	Report; Match centre Player of the Match: Tom Stewart	Try: Arendse 19'; Burger 32'; Con: C. Smith (2) 19' 33'; Pen: C. Smith (3) 13' 40' 63'; Cards: Louw (yellow card) 42'; Du Plessis (yellow card) 76'	Attendance: 12,196; Referee: Craig Evans
Ulster lineup: 1. Andrew Warwick, 2. Tom Stewart, 3. Jeffery Toomaga-Allen, 4. Kieran Treadwell, 5. Sam Carter, 6. David McCann, 7. Nick Timoney, 8. Duane Vermeulen, 9. Nathan Doak, 10. Billy Burns, 11. Jacob Stockdale, 12. Stewart Moore, 13. James Hume, 14. Robert Baloucoune, 15. Michael Lowry.; Replacements: 16. John Andrew (for Stewart 77'), 17. Eric O'Sullivan (for Warwick 50'), 18. Gareth Milasinovich (for Toomaga-Allen 61'), 19. Alan O'Connor (for Treadwell 61'), 20. Harry Sheridan (for Carter 50'), 21. John Cooney (for Cooney 77'), 22. Jude Postlethwaite (for S. Moore 50'), 23. Marcus Rea (for McCann 61').				Attendance: 12,196; Referee: Craig Evans

17. 14 April 2022	(1 BP) Ulster (Ireland)	40-19	(Wales) Dragons	Ravenhill Stadium, Belfast
	Try: McCann 7'; Stewart (3) 29' 37' 48'; Timoney 67'; Penalty try 79'; Con: Cooney (4) 9' 38' 50' 68'	Report; Match centre Highlights; Player of the Match: Tom Stewart	Try: O'Brien 11'; Dee 54'; R. Williams 56'; Con: O'Brien 12'; Reed 55'; Cards: Dee (yellow card) 37'; Hewitt (yellow card) 80'	Attendance: 11,972; Referee: Andrew McMenemy
Ulster lineup: 1. Eric O'Sullivan, 2. Tom Stewart, 3. Tom O'Toole, 4. Alan O'Connor (c), 5. Sam Carter, 6. David McCann, 7. Marcus Rea, 8. Duane Vermeulen, 9. John Cooney, 10. Billy Burns, 11. Jacob Stockdale, 12. Stuart McCloskey, 13. James Hume, 14. Craig Gilroy, 15. Michael Lowry.; Replacements: 16. John Andrew (for Stewart 66'), 17. Andrew Warwick (for O'Sullivan 22'), 18. Jeff Toomaga-Allen (for O'Toole 5'), 19. Kieran Treadwell (for Carter 58'), 20. Nick Timoney (for Vermeulen 53'), 21. Nathan Doak (for Burns 76'), 22. Stewart Moore (for McCloskey 64'), 23. Ethan McIlroy (for Lowry 44'-55', for Gilroy 76').				Attendance: 11,972; Referee: Andrew McMenemy

18. 21 April 2023	Ulster (Ireland)	28-14	(Scotland) Edinburgh	Ravenhill Stadium, Belfast
	Try: Stockdale 25'; Cooney 41'; Timoney 64'; Con: Cooney (2) 42' 65'; Pen: Cooney (3) 37' 43' 78'	Report; Highlights; Match centre Player of the Match: John Cooney	Try: Graham 7'; Nel 75'; Con: Boffelli (2) 8' 76'; Cards: Young (yellow card) 64'	Attendance: 14,641; Referee: Andrea Piardi
Ulster lineup: 1. Andy Warwick, 2. Rob Herring, 3. Jeff Toomaga-Allen, 4. Alan O'Connor (c), 5. Kieran Treadwell, 6. David McCann, 7. Nick Timoney, 8. Duane Vermeulen, 9. John Cooney, 10. Billy Burns, 11. Jacob Stockdale, 12. Stuart Moore, 13. James Hume, 14. Robert Baloucoune, 15. Michael Lowry.; Replacements: 16. Tom Stewart (for Herring 27'), 17. Callum Reid (for Warwick 71'), 18. Gareth Milasinovich (for Toomaga-Allen 62'), 19. Sam Carter (for O'Connor 56'), 20. Harry Sheridan (for Marshall 69'), 21. Nathan Doak (for Baloucoune 40'), 22. Luke Marshall (for Lowry 12'), 23. Craig Gilroy (for Hume 13').				Attendance: 14,641; Referee: Andrea Piardi

=== Quarter-final ===
5 May 2023	Ulster (Ireland)	10-15	(Ireland) Connacht	Ravenhill Stadium, Belfast
19:35	Try: O'Connor 63'; Con: Cooney 65'; Pen: Cooney 20'	Report; Match Centre	Pen: Carty (5) 24' 33' 40' 44' 75'	Attendance: 12,844; Referee: Andrew Brace
Ulster lineup: 1. Rory Sutherland, 2. Rob Herring, 3. Jeff Toomaga-Allen, 4. Alan O'Connor (c), 5. Kieran Treadwell, 6. David McCann, 7. Nick Timoney, 8. Duane Vermeulen, 9. John Cooney, 10. Billy Burns, 11. Jacob Stockdale, 12. Stuart McCloskey, 13. James Hume, 14. Robert Baloucoune, 15. Michael Lowry.; Replacements: 16. Tom Stewart (for Herring 58'), 17. Eric O'Sullivan (for O'Sullivan 78'), 18. Gareth Milasinovich (for Toomaga-Allen 40'), 19. Sam Carter (for Treadwell 58'), 20. Jordi Murphy (for Timoney 58'), 21. Nathan Doak (for Cooney 73'), 22. Stewart Moore (for Lowry 23'), 23. Craig Gilroy (for Hume 65').				Attendance: 12,844; Referee: Andrew Brace

=== 2022–23 European Rugby Champions Cup ===
==== Group stage ====
2022–23 European Rugby Champions Cup Pool B
Team	P	W	D	L	PF	PA	Diff	TF	TA	TB	LB	Pts
(France) La Rochelle	4	4	0	0	120	57	+63	15	7	2	0	18
(France) Toulouse	4	4	0	0	110	53	+57	12	7	1	0	17
(South Africa) Stormers	4	3	0	1	106	68	+38	13	7	3	0	15
(England) Leicester Tigers	4	3	0	1	116	89	+27	11	10	1	1	14
(Wales) Ospreys	4	3	0	1	100	88	+12	12	10	1	1	14
(Ireland) Munster	4	2	0	2	73	67	+6	8	5	0	2	10
(France) Montpellier	4	1	1	2	92	104	–12	13	13	2	1	9
(Ireland) Ulster	4	1	0	3	54	93	–39	7	11	1	2	7
(France) Clermont	4	1	0	3	85	111	–26	8	12	1	1	6
(England) Sale Sharks	4	1	0	3	74	94	–20	11	12	1	0	5
(England) London Irish	4	0	1	3	76	115	–39	10	15	0	1	3
(England) Northampton Saints	4	0	0	4	54	121	–67	5	16	0	1	1
Green background (rows 1 to 8) indicates qualification places for the Champions Cup round of 16. Blue background (rows 9 to 10) indicates qualification places for the Challenge Cup round of 16. Starting table — source: European Professional Club Rugby

11 December 2022	(1 BP) Sale Sharks (England)	39–0	(Ireland) Ulster	Salford City Stadium, Barton-upon-Irwell
13:00	Try: T. Curry 16' m D. du Preez 22' c R. du Preez 49' m Curtis 64' c McGuigan 71' c Reed 77' m Con: R. du Preez (3/6) 22', 65', 72'; Pen: R. du Preez (1/1) 28'	Report; Highlights	Cards: Vermeulen (yellow card) 30'	Referee: Mathieu Raynal (France)
Ulster lineup: 1. Andrew Warwick, 2. Rob Herring, 3. Tom O'Toole, 4. Alan O'Connor (c), 5. Kieran Treadwell, 6. Matty Rea, 7. Nick Timoney, 8. Duane Vermeulen (yellow card) 30', 9. Nathan Doak, 10. Billy Burns, 11. Jacob Stockdale, 12. Stuart McCloskey, 13. James Hume, 14. Ethan McIlroy, 15. Michael Lowry.; Replacements: 16. Tom Stewart (for Herring 50'), 17. Eric O'Sullivan (for Warwick 50'), 18. Marty Moore (for O'Toole 7', 50'), 19. Sam Carter (for O'Connor 74'), 20. Marcus Rea (for Matty Rea 45'), 21. David Shanahan (for Doak 59'), 22. Stewart Moore (for Hume 31'), 23. Ben Moxham (for Stockdale 59').				Referee: Mathieu Raynal (France)

2. 17 December 2022	(2 BP) Ulster (Ireland)	29–36	(France) La Rochelle	Aviva Stadium, Dublin (Note: Match was originally due to take place at the Kingspan Stadium, but had to be relocated because of a frozen pitch.)
17:30	Try: Henderson 44' c Cooney 60' c Vermeulen 63' m Stewart 74' c Con: Cooney (3/4) 45', 61', 75'; Pen: Cooney (1/1) 80+1'; Cards: Henderson (yellow card) 24'	Report; Highlights	Try: Dulin 28' c Hastoy 40' c Bougarit 53' c Con: Hastoy (3/3) 30', 40+1', 54'; Pen: Hastoy (5/6) 4', 15', 19', 25', 39'; Cards: Danty (yellow card) 60'	Attendance: 0 Referee: Luke Pearce (England)
Ulster lineup: 1. Rory Sutherland, 2. Tom Stewart, 3. Marty Moore, 4. Alan O'Connor, 5. Sam Carter, 6. Iain Henderson (c) (yellow card) 24', 7. Nick Timoney, 8. Duane Vermeulen, 9. John Cooney, 10. Billy Burns, 11. Rob Lyttle, 12. Stuart McCloskey, 13. Luke Marshall, 14. Ethan McIlroy, 15. Michael Lowry.; Replacements: 16. Rob Herring (for Stewart 52'), 17. Eric O'Sullivan (for Sutherland 60'), 18. Gareth Milasinovich (for M. Moore 60'), 19. Kieran Treadwell (for Carter 53'), 20. David McCann (for Timoney 65'), 21. Nathan Doak (for Burns 21'), 22. Stewart Moore (for Marshall 73'), 23. Ben Moxham.				Attendance: 0 Referee: Luke Pearce (England)

3. 14 January 2023	La Rochelle (France)	7 – 3	(Ireland) Ulster (1 BP)	Stade Marcel-Deflandre, La Rochelle
18:30	Try: Sclavi 80+1' c Con: Hastoy (1/1) 80+3'; Cards: Boudehent (yellow card) 32'	Report; Highights	Pen: N. Doak (1/2) 65'	Referee: Nika Amashukeli (Georgia)
Ulster lineup: 1. Rory Sutherland, 2. Rob Herring, 3. Jeff Toomaga-Allen, 4. Alan O'Connor, 5. Kieran Treadwell, 6. Iain Henderson (c), 7. Nick Timoney, 8. Duane Vermeulen, 9. Nathan Doak, 10. Ian Madigan, 11. Jacob Stockdale, 12. Luke Marshall, 13. Stewart Moore, 14. Rob Lyttle, 15. Michael Lowry.; Replacements: 16. John Andrew (for Herring 65'), 17. Eric O'Sullivan (for Sutherland 61'), 18. Andrew Warwick (for Toomaga-Allen 70'), 19. Harry Sheridan (for Treadwell 57'), 20. David McCann (for Henderson 61'), 21. Michael McDonald, 22. Ben Moxham (for Marshall 26'), 23. Ethan McIlroy.				Referee: Nika Amashukeli (Georgia)

4. 21 January 2023	Ulster (Ireland)	22–11	(England) Sale Sharks	Ravenhill Stadium, Belfast
20:00	Try: Lyttle 19' m Herring 64' c Vermeulen 76' c Con: Cooney (2/2) 65', 78'; Pen: N. Doak (1/1) 38'; Cards: N. Doak (yellow card) 45'	Report; Highlights; Star of the Match: Nick Timoney	Try: B. Curry 47' m Pen: R. Du Preez (2/2) 3', 25'; Cards: Rodd (yellow card) 17'; Ross (yellow card) 75'	Attendance: 18,196; Referee: Pierre Brousset (France)
Ulster lineup: 1. Andrew Warwick, 2. Tom Stewart, 3. Jeff Toomaga-Allen, 4. Alan O'Connor (c), 5. Sam Carter, 6. Harry Sheridan, 7. Nick Timoney, 8. Duane Vermeulen, 9. Nathan Doak (yellow card) 45', 10. Billy Burns, 11. Jacob Stockdale, 12. Stuart McCloskey, 13. James Hume, 14. Rob Lyttle, 15. Michael Lowry.; Replacements: 16. Rob Herring (for Stewart 53'), 17. Eric O'Sullivan (for Warwick 53'), 18. Tom O'Toole (for Toomaga-Allen 53'), 19. Kieran Treadwell (for Carter 62'), 20. Jordi Murphy (for Doak 56'), 21. John Cooney (for Sheridan 50'), 22. Ian Madigan, 23. Ben Moxham.				Attendance: 18,196; Referee: Pierre Brousset (France)

==== Round of 16 ====
1 April 2023	Leinster (Ireland)	30-15	(Ireland) Ulster	Aviva Stadium, Dublin
17:30	Try: Baird 19'; Gibson-Park 53'; Porter 62'; Con: R. Byrne (3) 20' 54' 63'; Pen: R. Byrne (3) 11' 25' 37'	Report	Try: Hume 26'; Herring 57'; Con: Cooney 58'; Pen: Doak 10'; Cards: Hume (yellow card) 52'; Sheridan (yellow card) 68'	Attendance: 51,700; Referee: Luke Pearce
Ulster lineup: 1. Rory Sutherland, 2. Rob Herring, 3. Tom O'Toole, 4. Alan O'Connor (c), 5. Kieran Treadwell, 6. David McCann, 7. Nick Timoney, 8. Duane Vermeulen, 9. Nathan Doak, 10. Billy Burns, 11. Jacob Stockdale, 12. Stuart McCloskey, 13. James Hume (yellow card) 52', 14. Robert Baloucoune, 15. Michael Lowry.; Replacements: 16. Tom Stewart (for Herring 58-62'), 17. Eric O'Sullivan (for Sutherland 62'), 18. Jeff Toomaga-Allen (for O'Toole 41'), 19. Harry Sheridan (for McCann 46' (yellow card) 68'), 20. Marcus Rea (for Treadwell 66'), 21. John Cooney (for Doak 50'), 22. Stewart Moore (for Burns 54'), 23. Ben Moxham (for Baloucoune 78').				Attendance: 51,700; Referee: Luke Pearce

=== Friendlies ===
2 September 2022	Ulster (Ireland)	31-12	(England) Exeter Chiefs	Ravenhill Stadium, Belfast
	Try: Madigan; Lyttle; Andrew; Marshall; Stockdale; Con: Flannery (2); N. Doak	Report	Try: Schickerling; Norey; Con: Skinner	Referee: Andrew Brace
Ulster lineup: 1. Callum Reid, 2. Declan Moore, 3. Jeff Toomaga-Allen, 4. Frank Bradshaw Ryan, 5. Sam Carter, 6. Harry Sheridan, 7. Sean Reffell, 8. Jordi Murphy (c), 9. Michael McDonald, 10. Jake Flannery, 11. Rob Lyttle, 12. Ian Madigan, 13. Angus Curtis, 14. Aaron Sexton, 15. Shea O'Brien.; Replacements: Eric O'Sullivan, Tom Stewart, Marty Moore, John Andrew, Gareth Milsinovich, Alan O'Connor, Cormac Izuchukwu, Matty Rea, Marcus Rea, Greg Jones, Nathan Doak, Billy Burns, Conor McKee, Jacob Stockdale, Luke Marshall, Craig Gilroy, Stewart Moore, Rory Telfer.				Referee: Andrew Brace

== Women's personnel ==
=== Squad ===
Ulster Senior Women's Squad
**Props**: (Ireland) Ava Fannin; (Ireland) Gemma McCamley; (Ireland) Sadhbh McGrath; (Ireland) Aisling O'Connell; (Ireland) **Ilse van Staden**; **Hookers**: (Ireland) Beth Cregan; (Ireland) Megan Simpson; **Locks**: (Ireland) Brenda Barr; (Ireland) Hannah Beattie; (Ireland) Keelin Brady; (Ireland) Helen McGhee; (Ireland) Nicole Watterson	**Back row**: (Ireland) Sophie Barrett; (Ireland) India Daley; (Ireland) Megan Simpson; (Ireland) Stacey Sloan; (Ireland) Fiona Tuite; **Scrum-halves**: (Ireland) Hannah Downey; (Ireland) Rachael McIlroy; (Ireland) Amber Redmond; **Out-halves**: (Ireland) Ella Durkan	**Centres**: (Ireland) Mya Alcorn; (Ireland) Emma Jordan; (Ireland) Kelly McCormill; (Ireland) Amanda Morton; **Back three**: (Ireland) Maeve Liston; (Ireland) Niamh Marley; (Ireland) Lucy Thompson; (Ireland) Fern Wilson
(c) denotes the team captain, **Bold** denotes internationally capped players.

== Women's competitions and results ==
=== 2022-23 Women's Interprovincial Series ===
	Team	P	W	D	L	PF	PA	LP	Pts
1	Munster	3	3	0	0	110	41	0	12
2	Leinster	3	2	0	1	98	36	0	8
3	Connacht	3	1	0	2	59	10	0	4
4	Ulster	3	0	0	3	19	102	1	1

7 January 2023	**(1 BP) Munster**	**34-0**	**Ulster**	Musgrave Park, Cork
	Try: Deirbhile Nic a Bháird (2); Stephanie Nunan; Aoife Doyle; Claire Bennett (2); Con: Nicole Cronin; Kate Flannery	Report
Ulster lineup: 1. Sadhbh McGrath, 2. Beth Cregan(c), 3. Ilse van Staden, 4. Keelin Brady, 5. Helen McGhee, 6. Brenda Barr, 7. Fiona Tuite, 8. Stacey Sloan, 9. Rachael McIlroy, 10. Ella Durkin, 11. Niamh Marley, 12. Mya Acorn, 13. Kelly McCormill, 14. Fern Wilson, 15. Maeve Liston.; Replacements: Sophie Barrett (for Sloan 40'), Ava Fannin (for Van Staden 57'), Megan Simpson (for Tuite 57'), Lucy Thompson (for McCormill 57'), Gemma McCamley (for McGrath 63'), Amber Redmond (for McIlroy 63'), Nicole Watterson (for McGhee), Amanda Morton (for Alcorn 69')

14 January 2023	**(1 BP) Ulster**	**19-25**	**Connacht (1 BP)**	Ravenhill Stadium, Belfast
	Try: Beth Cregan (2); Niamh Marley; Con: Ella Durkan (2)	Report	Try: Clara Barrett (2); Ava Ryder; Emma Fabby; Con: Nicole Fowley; Pen: Nicole Fowley
Ulster lineup: 1. Sadhbh McGrath, 2. Megan Simpson, 3. Ilse van Staden, 4. Keelin Brady, 5. Brenda Barr, 6. India Daley, 7. Beth Cregan (c), 8. Sophie Barrett, 9. Rachael McIlroy, 10. Ella Durkan, 11. Niamh Marley, 12. Mya Alcorn, 13. Kelly McCormill, 14. Fern Wilson, 15. Maeve Liston.; Replacements: Gemma McCamley (for McGrath 30-53'), Ava Fannin (for van Staden 30-53'), Emma Jordan (for Alcorn 40'), Helen McGhee (for Barr 60'), Fiona Tuite (for Daley 60'), Amber Redmond (for McIlroy 65'), Stacey Sloan (for Simpson 71'), Amanda Morton.

21 January 2023	**Ulster**	**0-43**	**Leinster (1 BP)**	Upper Malone, Belfast
	Try: Emma Hooban; Hannah O’Connor (3); Molly Scuffil-McCabe; Ella Roberts; Niamh Byrne; Con: Dannah O’Brien (4)	Report
Ulster lineup: 1. Sadhbh McGrath, 2. Megan Simpson, 3. Ilse van Staden (Cooke RFC), 4. Keelin Brady, 5. Brenda Barr, 6. India Daley, 7. Beth Cregan (c), Sophie Barrett, 9. Rachael McIlroy, 10. Ella Durkan, 11. Niamh Marley, 12. Kelly McCormill, 13. Emma Jordan, 14. Lucy Thompson, 15. Maeve Liston.; Replacements: Aishling O'Connell (for Van Staden 27'), Gemma McCamley (for McGrath 27'), Helen McGhee (for Barr 40') Fiona Tuite (for Barrett 40'), Fern Wilson (for Thompson 40'), Stacey Sloan (for Daley 51'), Hannah Beattie (for Brady 63'), Hannah Downey (for McIlroy 68').
