= Edoardo Lubian =

- Born: 11 October 1990 (age 36) Rovigo, Italy
- Height: 1.87 m (6 ft 2 in)
- Weight: 105 kg (231 lb; 16 st 7 lb)

Rugby union career
- Position: Flanker
Youth career
- Rovigo Delta
Senior career
Years	Team	Apps	(Points)
2009−2024	Rovigo Delta	252	(145)
2014	→Benetton Treviso	1	(0)
- Correct as of 7 June 2020
International career
Years	Team	Apps	(Points)
2010	Italy Under 20	1	(0)
- Correct as of 7 June 2020

Edoardo Lubian (born 11 October 1990 in Rovigo) was an Italian rugby union player. His usual position was as a Flanker and he played for Rovigo Delta in Serie A Elite from 2009 to 2024.

For 2013–14 Pro12 season, he was named like Additional Player for Benetton Treviso.

In 2010, Lubian was named in the Italy Under 20 squad.
