= Gareth Milasinovich =

South African rugby union player

Gareth Richard Milasinovich
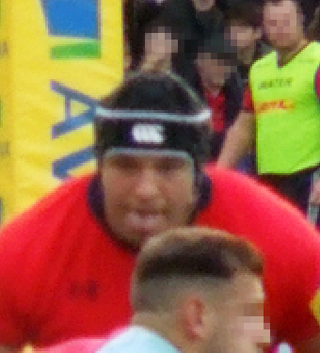
- Full name: Gareth Richard Milasinovich
- Born: 15 December 1992 (age 33) Johannesburg, South Africa
- Height: 1.91 m (6 ft 3 in)
- Weight: 130 kg (20 st; 290 lb)
- School: St John's College
- University: University of Johannesburg
- Notable relative: Norman McFarland (Grandfather)

Rugby union career
- Position: Prop
- Current team: Valence Romans Drôme Rugby
Youth career
- 2011: Falcons U19
- 2015–2016: Worcester Warriors
Amateur team(s)
| Years | Team | Apps | (Points) |
| 2015 | UJ | 7 | (0) |
Senior career
| Years | Team | Apps | (Points) |
| 2015 | Yorkshire Carnegie | 2 | |
| 2015–2019 | Worcester Warriors | 59 | (0) |
| 2019–2023 | Ulster | 24 | (5) |
| 2021 | → Saracens (loan) | 1 | (0) |
| 2023- | Valence Romans | 0 | (0) |
- Correct as of 5 May 2023

Gareth Richard Milasinovich (/mɪləˈsɪnəvɪtʃ/ mil-ə-SIN-ə-vitch; born 15 December 1992) is a South African rugby union player, who plays for Valence Romans Drôme Rugby. He can play as a loosehead or tighthead prop.

== Rugby career ==
=== Youth and Varsity Cup rugby ===
Milasinovich was born in Johannesburg, where he attended St John's College. He was chosen for the Lions Welpies side in 2010 at schoolboy level, and made two appearances for the Kempton Park-based Falcons' Under-19 team during the 2011 Under-19 Provincial Championship, scoring a try in their 29–21 victory over Boland U19.

It wasn't until 2015 that he next featured in a nationwide competition, when he played for the University of Johannesburg in the Varsity Cup competition. He started all seven of their matches in the loosehead prop position, with UJ winning three of those matches, failing to qualify for the semi-finals.

=== Worcester Warriors ===
After the 2015 Varsity Cup, Milasinovich moved to England to join the academy of English Premiership side Worcester Warriors. He had a short spell at Championship side Yorkshire Carnegie, making two appearances for the Leeds-based side at the start of the 2015–16 season.

He made his debut for Worcester Warriors in their European Rugby Challenge Cup, coming on as a replacement in their opening match in Pool 4 of the competition against French side La Rochelle. He started their next match against Italian side Zebre, eventually playing in five of their six matches as Worcester Warriors finished bottom of the Pool 4 log to be eliminated from the competition. He made his Premiership debut on 5 December 2015, playing off the bench in a 20–29 defeat to Leicester Tigers. He made three further substitute appearances over the course of the season as the Worcester Warriors finished in tenth position. In his final match against Exeter Chiefs, Milasinovich suffered an achilles tendon rupture, ruling him out of injury for several months. Despite this injury, Milasinovich was promoted to the senior squad prior to the 2016–17 season.

=== Ulster ===
Milasinovich joined Irish Pro14 side Ulster ahead of the 2019–20 season. In July 2019 he sustained an injury to his ACL, ruling him out for several months. He has since fully recovered.

He is Irish-qualified through his grandfather, Norman McFarland, who was from Ulster and represented the province as a hooker.

He joined Saracens on a two-month loan at the end of 2021.

He was released by Ulster at the end of the 2022–23 season, and joined Valence Romans Drôme Rugby in the French Pro D2.
