= Alessandro Gesi =

Italian rugby union player

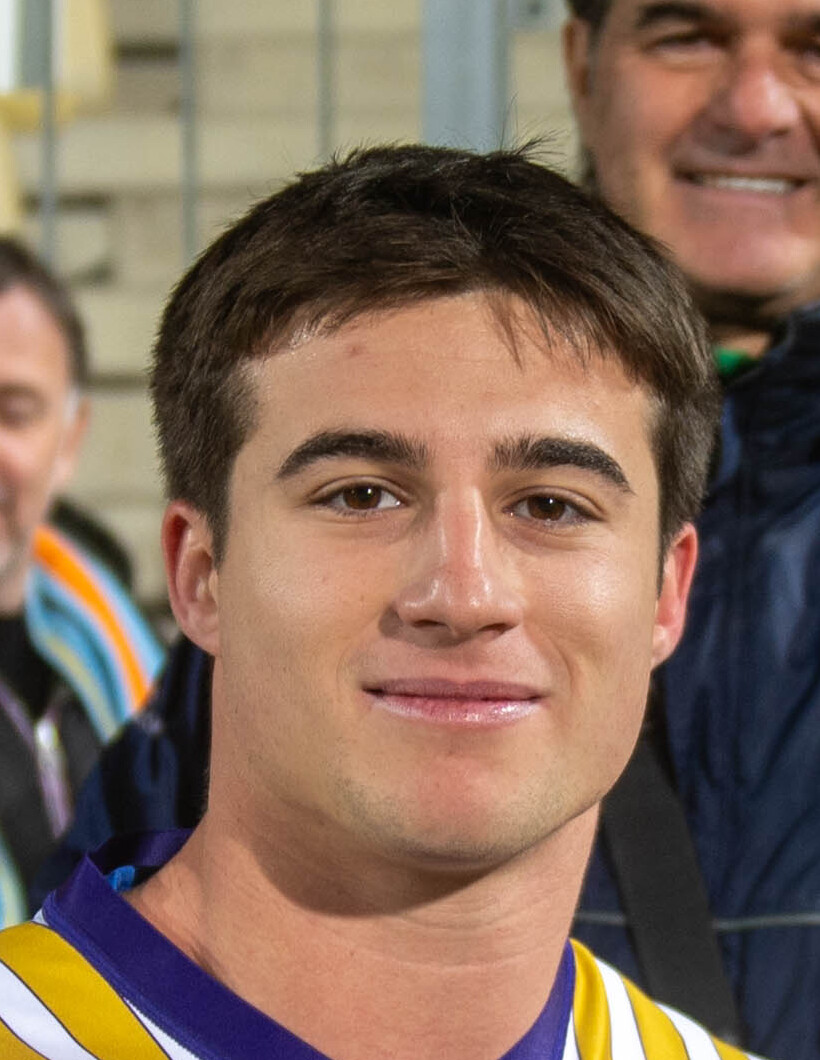
- Gesi in 2025
- Born: 31 October 2003 (age 23) Livorno, Italy
- Height: 178 cm (5 ft 10 in)
- Weight: 86 kg (190 lb; 13 st 8 lb)
- Notable relative: Simone Gesi (Brother)

Rugby union career
- Position: Wing
- Current team: Rovigo Delta
Youth career
- Rugby Livorno 1931
- Zebre Academy
Senior career
Years	Team	Apps	(Points)
2023–2025	Zebre Parma	4	(5)
2023–2025	→Colorno	18	
2025–	Rovigo Delta		
- Correct as of 1 Jul 2025
International career
Years	Team	Apps	(Points)
2022–2023	Italy U20	12	(10)

Alessandro Gesi (born 31 October 2003) is an Italian professional rugby union player who plays Wing for Rovigo Delta in the Italian Serie A Elite.

== Professional career ==
Gesi signed for Zebre Parma in May 2022 ahead of the 2022–23 United Rugby Championship as Academy Player. He made his debut in Round 14 of the 2024–25 season against the Munster.

In 2023–24 and 2024–25 seasons, he played on loan also for Colorno in the Italian Serie A Elite as Additional Player.

In 2022 and 2023, he was named in Italy U20s squad for annual Six Nations Under 20s Championship. On 30 November 2023, he was called in Italy Under 23 squad for test series against IRFU Combined Academies.
