= Gianluca Faliva =

Italy international rugby union player

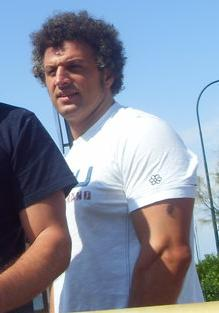
- Gianluca Faliva in 2009
- Born: 26 December 1973 (age 52) Camposampiero, Province of Padua, Italy
- Height: 5 ft 10 in (1.78 m)
- Weight: 246 lb (112 kg)

Rugby union career
- Position: Loosehead prop
Amateur team(s)
Years	Team	Apps	(Points)
1993–1997	CUS Padova Rugby		
Senior career
Years	Team	Apps	(Points)
1997–2007	Benetton	161	
2007–2009	Rovigo	17	(0)
International career
Years	Team	Apps	(Points)
1999–2002	Italy	4	(0)

Gianluca Faliva (born 26 December 1973) is a retired Italian rugby union player. He played as a loosehead prop forward.

== Early career ==
Gianluca Faliva was born in Camposampiero, Padua, Italy, and did not start playing rugby until he was 20, when he joined CUS Padova Rugby under pressure from some of his colleagues in the Italian Police who also played for the club. Until then, he played football as a centre-back in a low-level local amateur side.

Coached by former international Marzio Innocenti, he soon developed into a physical but very dynamic prop, becoming one of the linchpins of the side.

In 1996, still working as a policeman, Faliva made his Serie A1 (now Top12) debut with the still amateur CUS Padova.

== Pro and international career ==
In 1997 Faliva signed a professional contract with Benetton Treviso, one of the highest-ranked clubs in Italy.

With Treviso, Faliva proved to be a class player and earned his first international call-up from coach Georges Coste against then-World Champions South Africa in Durban in June 1999. Italy suffered its worst defeat ever, but Faliva was handed his first cap after coming in as a sub.

The next-in-charge head coaches Massimo Mascioletti and Brad Johnstone dismissed Faliva, who had to wait for three years before his second cap (and his first start); it happened against New Zealand in 2002 under coach John Kirwan. Kirwan also awarded Faliva his third and fourth caps, against Argentina and Australia.

In the meanwhile, Faliva's club career with Treviso continued flourishing on a national and European level. He is second for number of national titles won (7) after Massimiliano Perziano (8) and alongside other players such as Denis and Manuel Dallan, Carlo Checchinato and Romano Bettarello.

Excluded from the Italian squad due to the presence of Andrea Lo Cicero, Martin Castrogiovanni, Salvatore Perugini, Carlos Nieto and Federico Pucciariello amongst others, Faliva remained a props in the national league. This earned him a call-up to the Barbarians. He played his only game for them in March 2005, in a defeat against Leicester Tigers.

In 2007, Faliva left Benetton Treviso to join Rugby Rovigo. In 2009 he decided to quit the professional game after having been sidelined throughout the previous season due to injury.

== Doping allegations ==
In 2003 Faliva and fellow international and Treviso player Fabio Ongaro were accused of using Epoetin beta (NeoRecormon) for performance enhancement purposes. He was also accused of selling such substance, at which point the trial went out of the sporting circles to reach the penal courts. The Public Prosecutor for this case recommended an 18-months jail spell and a 15,000 Euro fine for the player, but in 2009 the trial was concluded with a sentence of absolution for Faliva and Ongaro, as no proof of either of them using or detaining the doping substance could be presented. even though some witnesses insisted on his involvement.
