= Matteo Ferro =

Italian rugby union player

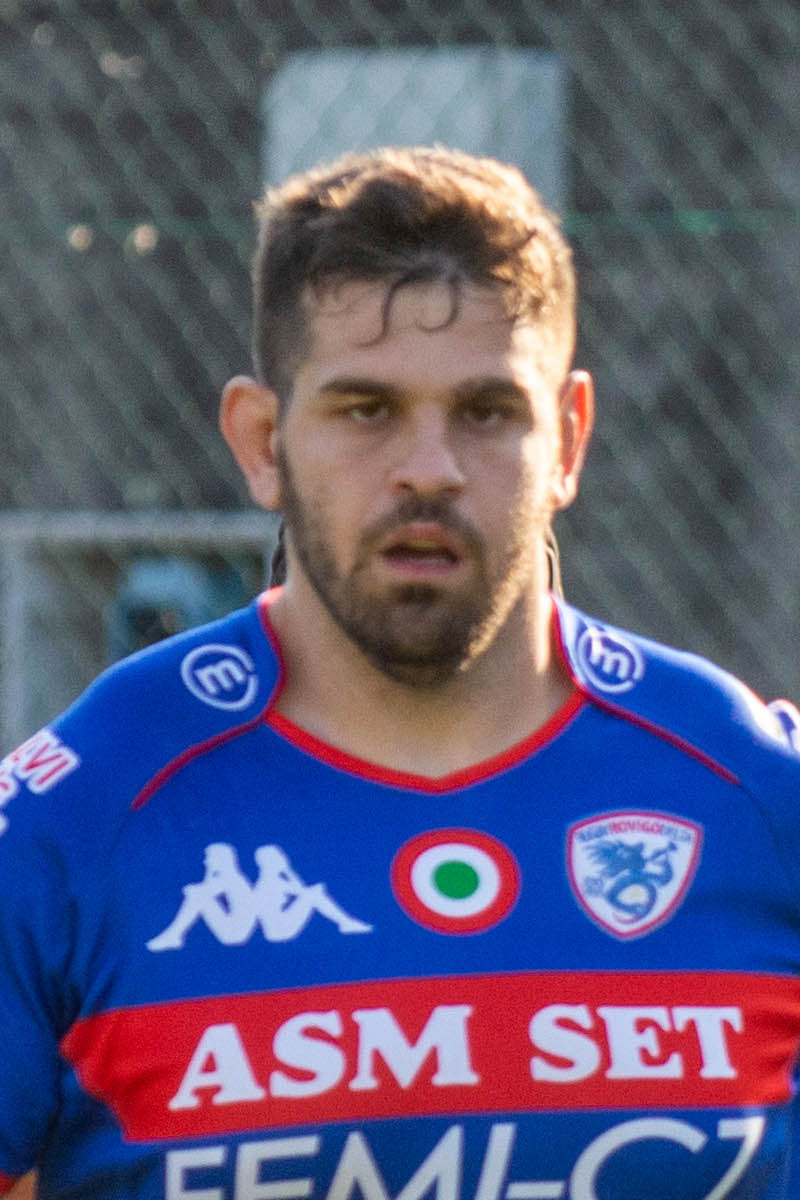
- Born: 9 July 1992 (age 34) Rovigo, Italy
- Height: 1.95 m (6 ft 5 in)
- Weight: 122 kg (19 st 3 lb; 269 lb)

Rugby union career
- Position: Flanker
Youth career
- Monti Rugby Rovigo Junior
- 2000−2011: Rovigo Delta
Senior career
Years	Team	Apps	(Points)
2011−2025	Rovigo Delta	200	(230)
- Correct as of 05 January 2026
International career
Years	Team	Apps	(Points)
2012	Italy Under 20	9	(0)
2014	Emerging Italy	3	(0)
- Correct as of 05 January 2026

Matteo Ferro (Rovigo, 9 July 1992) is an Italian rugby union player. His usual position was as a flanker, and he played for Rovigo Delta in Top12 with the role of captain.

In 2012, Ferro was named in the Italy Under 20 squad, and in 2014 he was also named in Emerging Italy squad for the 2014 IRB Tbilisi Cup.

He graduated in Economics and Commerce in 2021, was a coach, and is now the team manager of Monti Rugby Rovigo Junior.
