= Nathan Evans (rugby union) =

Welsh rugby union player

- Born: 3 January 2002 (age 24) Wales
- Height: 1.75 m (5 ft 9 in)
- Weight: 119 kg (262 lb; 18 st 10 lb)

Rugby union career
- Position: Prop
Senior career
Years	Team	Apps	(Points)
2021–	Cardiff	1	(0)
- Correct as of 18 December 2021
International career
Years	Team	Apps	(Points)
2021	Wales U20	5	(0)
- Correct as of 18 December 2021

Nathan Evans (born 31 January 2002) is a Welsh rugby union player, currently playing for United Rugby Championship side Cardiff. His preferred position is prop.

== Cardiff ==
Evans was named in the Cardiff academy squad for the 2021–22 season. He made his debut for Cardiff in the second round of the 2021–22 European Rugby Champions Cup against Harlequins, coming on as a replacement.
