= Simone Gesi =

Italy international rugby union player

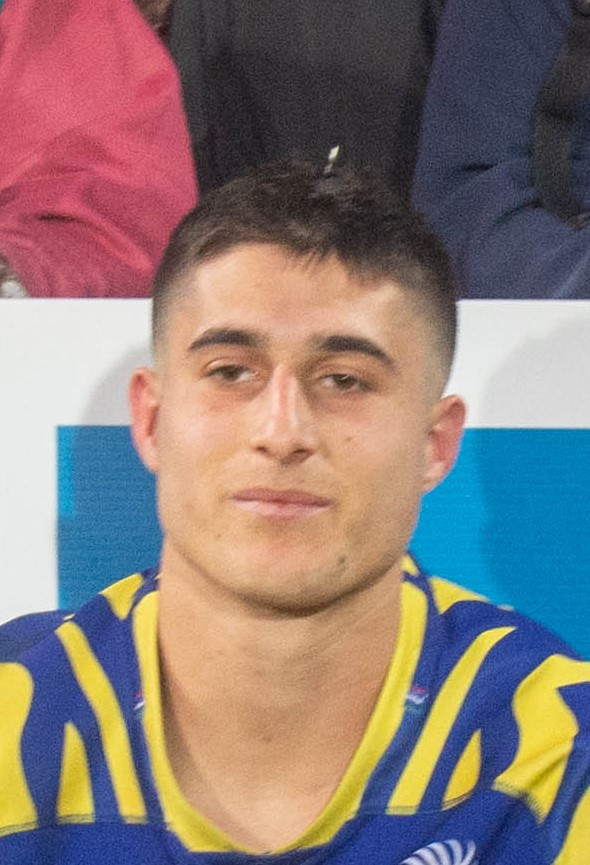
- Gesi in 2023
- Born: Simone Gesi; 23 May 2001 (age 25) Livorno, Italy
- Height: 1.83 m (6 ft 0 in)
- Weight: 80 kg (13 st; 180 lb)
- Notable relative: Alessandro Gesi (Brother)

Rugby union career
- Position: Wing
- Current team: Zebre
Youth career
- Rugby Livorno 1931
Senior career
Years	Team	Apps	(Points)
2019−2020	F.I.R. Academy		
2020–2022	Colorno	25	(79)
2022	→ Zebre	7	(10)
2022–	Zebre	66	(173)
- Correct as of 6 Aug 2026
International career
Years	Team	Apps	(Points)
2021	Italy U20	5	(10)
2021−2022	Italy A	4	(5)
2026	Italy XV	1	(0)
2023−	Italy	5	(5)
- Correct as of 12 Jul 2025
National sevens team
Years	Team		Comps
2023−2026	Italy Sevens		2

Simone Gesi (born 23 May 2001) is an Italian rugby union player for United Rugby Championship side Zebre Parma. His preferred position is wing.

== Career ==
Under contract with Italian Top10 team Colorno, in March 2022, Gesi was named as a Permit Player for Zebre Parma for the 2021–22 United Rugby Championship season ahead of the re-arranged Round 7 match against the Sharks. He made his debut in the same match, starting on the wing.

In 2021, Gesi was named in the Italy U20s squad for the annual Six Nations Under 20s Championship. On 14 October 2021, he was selected by Alessandro Troncon to be part of an Italy A 28-man squad and on 8 December, he was named in Emerging Italy 27-man squad also for the 2021 end-of-year rugby union internationals. On 8 March 2023, he was selected by Kieran Crowley to be part of an Italy squad for the 2023 Six Nations Championship. He made his debut against Scotland in the last match. On 28 January 2026 he was selected by Massimo Brunello to be part of an Italy XV squad for two official tests against Scotland A and Chile during 2026 men's rugby union internationals window of spring..

In June 2023, he was named in Italy Sevens squad for the 2023 Rugby Europe Sevens Championship Series.

In May 2025, he was named to Italy squad to participate in the 2025 Tour of Namibia and South Africa.
