= Alessio Sanavia =

Italian rugby union player (born 1996)

- Born: 18 September 1996 (age 30) Dolo, Italy
- Height: 1.79 m (5 ft 10 1/2 in)
- Weight: 114 kg (18.0 st; 251 lb)

Rugby union career
- Position: Prop
- Current team: Rovigo Delta
Youth career
- Valsugana Padova
Senior career
Years	Team	Apps	(Points)
2016−2019	Valsugana Padova	4	(0)
2019–2022	Valorugby Emilia	43	(15)
2022–2024	Zebre Parma	10	(0)
2024–	Rovigo Delta		
- Correct as of 24 Dec 2022

Alessio Sanavia (born 18 September 1996) is an Italian rugby union player, currently playing for Italian Serie A Elite side Rovigo Delta. His preferred position is prop.

After tree seasons with Top10 team Valorugby Emilia, Sanavia signed for Zebre Parma in May 2022 ahead of the 2022–23 United Rugby Championship He made his debut in Round 5 of the 2022–23 season against the Scarlets. He played with Zebre Parma in United Rugby Championship until 2023–24 season.

On 9 December 2023 he was called in Italy Under 23 squad for test series against IRFU Combined Academies.
