= Matteo Moscardi =

Italian rugby union player (born 2000)

- Born: 24 March 2000 (age 26) Rovigo, Italy
- Height: 1.83 m (6 ft 0 in)
- Weight: 92 kg (14 st 7 lb; 203 lb)
- Notable relative(s): Alberto Moscardi (father); Marco Moscardi (uncle); Alessandro Moscardi (uncle)

Rugby union career
- Position: Centre
- Current team: Rovigo Delta
Youth career
- Monti Rugby Rovigo Junior
- Rovigo Delta
Senior career
Years	Team	Apps	(Points)
2017–2019	F.I.R. Academy		
2019–2022	Rovigo Delta	39	(30)
2022–2023	Zebre Parma	2	(0)
2023−	Rovigo Delta		
- Correct as of 07 Jen 2026
International career
Years	Team	Apps	(Points)
2018–2019	Italy Under 20	10	(0)
2022	Emerging Italy	1	(0)
- Correct as of 07 Jen 2026

Matteo Moscardi (born 24 March 2000) is an Italian rugby union player. His usual position is as a centre and he currently plays for Rugby Rovigo Delta in Italian Serie A Elite.

Moscardi signed for Zebre Parma in July 2022 ahead of the 2022–23 United Rugby Championship. He made his debut in Round 2 of EPCR Challenge Cup in the 2022–23 season against the Bristol Bears. He played for Zebre until January 2023.

In 2018 and 2019 he was named in Italy U20s squad for annual Six Nations Under 20s Championship. On 26 May 2022, for the match against Netherlands, he was named in the 30-man Emerging Italy squad, for the 2022 July rugby union tests. On 10 January 2023, he was named in Italy A squad for a uncapped test against Romania A.
