= Rugby Rovigo Delta =

Italian rugby union club

(Italy) Rugby Rovigo Delta
- Full name: Rugby Rovigo Delta S.r.l.
- Union: Italian Rugby Federation
- Founded: 1935; 91 years ago
- Location: Rovigo, Italy
- Ground: Stadio Mario Battaglini (Capacity: 5,500)
- President: Francesco Zambelli
- Coach: Davide Giazzon
- Captain: Facundo Diederich Ferrario
- League: Serie A Élite
1st kit	2nd kit

Official website
- rugbyrovigodelta.it

Rugby Rovigo Delta, formerly known until 2010 as Rugby Rovigo, is an Italian rugby union club currently competing in the Serie A Élite. They are based in Rovigo, in Veneto.

== Overview ==
The club was founded in 1935 by medical student Dino Lanzoni, who discovered rugby at university in Padua.

They quickly became one of the strongest Italian sides and won 15 titles between 1951 and 2025. They have never been relegated from the top flight of Italian rugby union. They are the current Italian champion.

Former Rovigo players include Elio De Anna, Stefano Bettarello, Stefano Bordon, Alessandro Moscardi, Carlo Orlandi, Carlo Checchinato, Mirco Bergamasco, Manuel Contepomi, AJ Venter, Gert Smal, Viliami Ofahengaue and Naas Botha.

== Honours ==
- Italian championship
  - Champions (15): 1950–51, 1951–52, 1952–53, 1953–54, 1961–62, 1962–63, 1963–64, 1975–76, 1978–79, 1987–88, 1989–90, 2015–16, 2020–21, 2022–23, 2024–25
  - Runners-up (7): 1988–89, 1991–92, 2010–11, 2013–14, 2014–15, 2016–17, 2018–19, 2021−22
- Coppa Italia/Excellence Trophy
  - Champions (2): 2019–20, 2024–25
  - Runners-up (3): 1997–98, 2005–06, 2013−14
- Italian Super Cup:
  - Champions (1):2025

== Current squad ==
The Rovigo Delta senior squad for 2026–27 is:

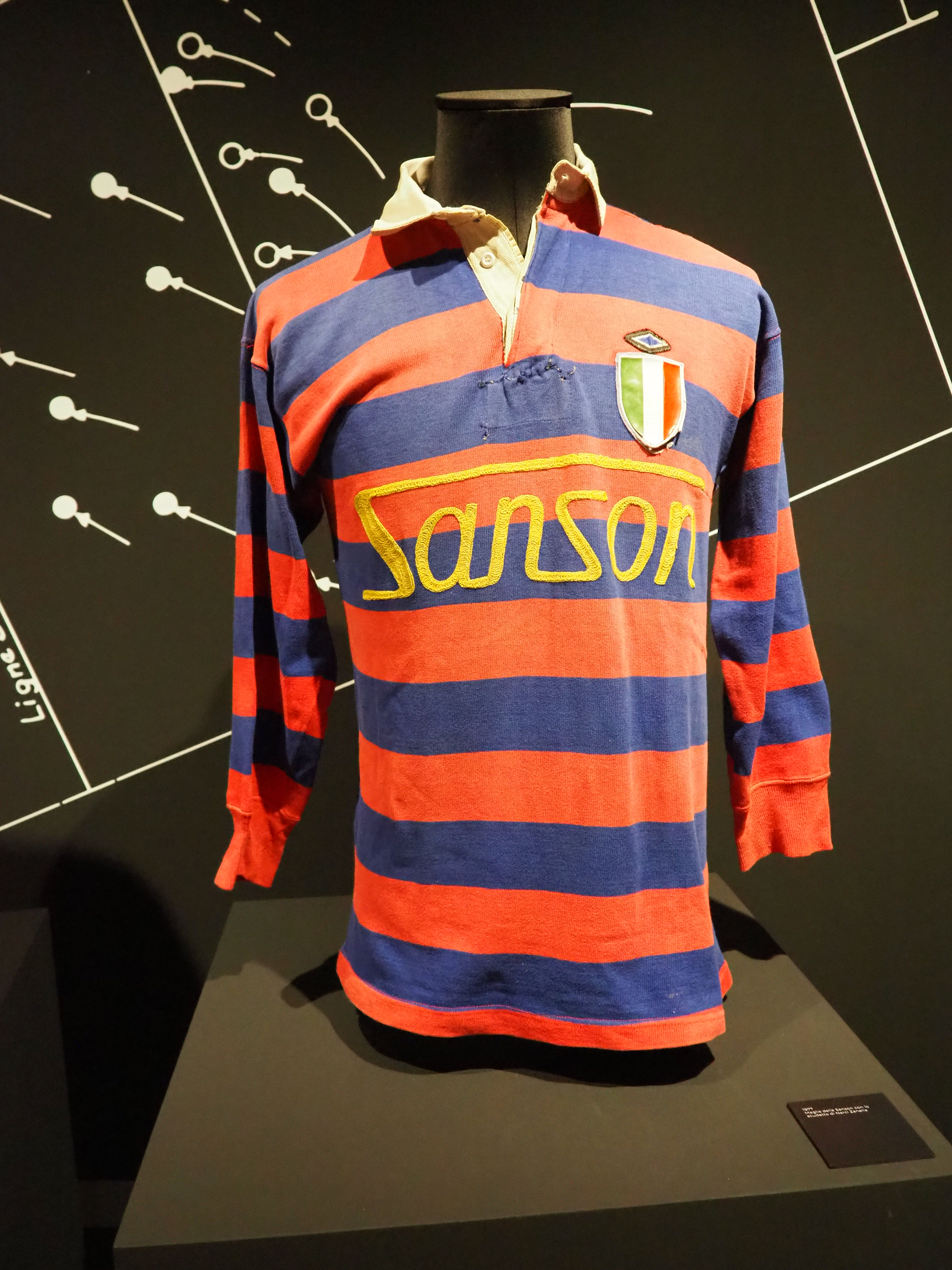
First historic shirt c. 1935

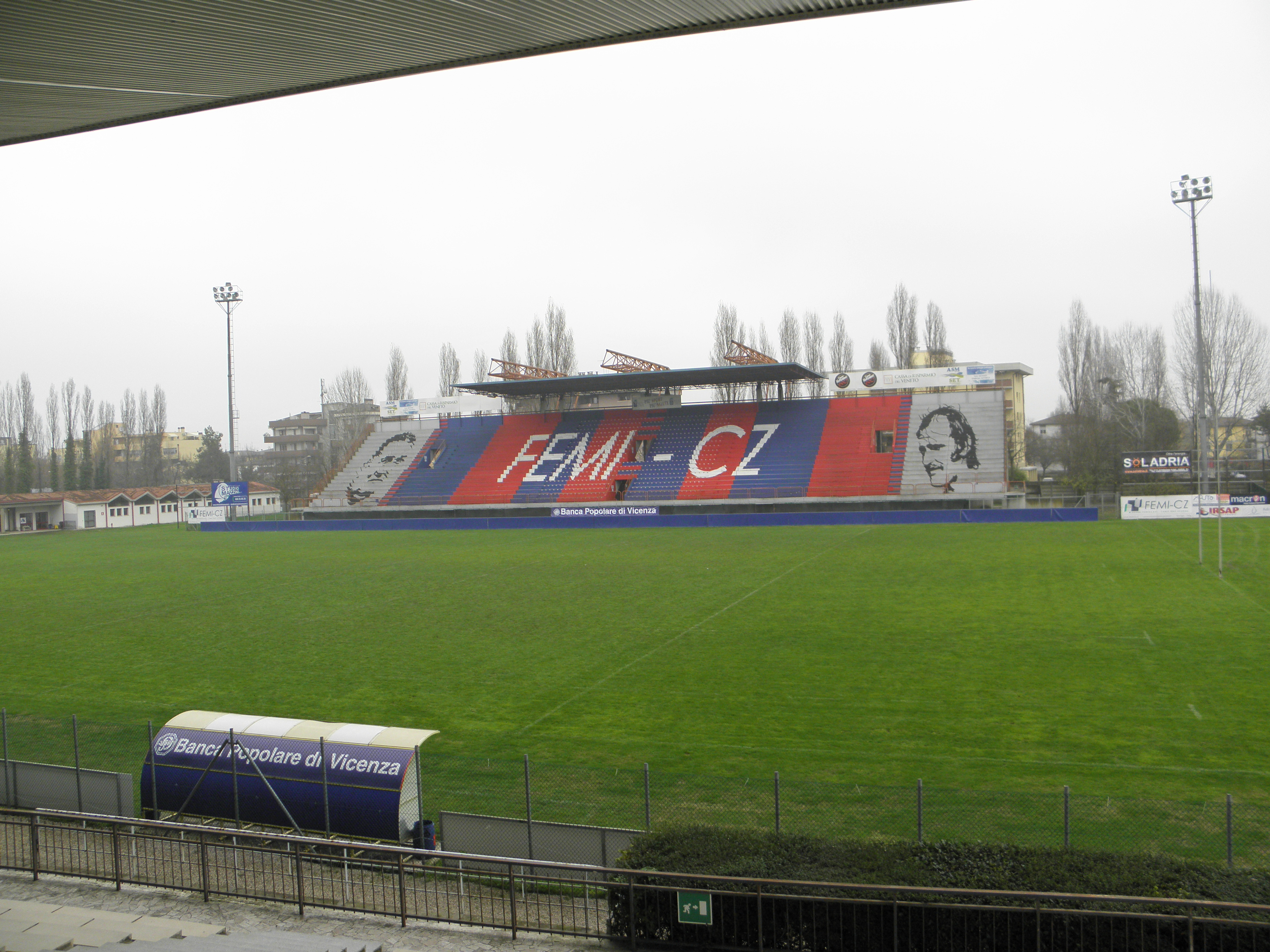
View of the Rovigo Stadium

Rovigo Delta squad
**Props**: (Italy) Nicola Bolognini; (Argentina) Javier Alejandro Corvalan; (Italy) Andrea Della Sala; (Italy) Emanuele Leccioli; (Italy) Nicola Pomaro; (Italy) Alessio Sanavia; (Italy) Entienne Swanepoel; **Hookers**: (Italy) Filippo Cadorini; (Italy) Lapo Frangini; (Italy) Enrico Giulian; **Locks**: (Australia) Ethan Cutler; (South Africa) Eliseo Fourcade; (Italy) Luigi Nalin; (Italy) Paolo Steolo	**Back row**: (Italy) Iacopo Bianchi; (Argentina) Lautaro Casado Sandri*; (Italy) Lorenzo Ciampolini; (Italy) Duccio Cosi; (Italy) Matteo Meggiato; (Italy) Riccardo Paganin; (Italy) Stefano Sironi; (Italy) Cesare Zucconi; **Scrum-halves**: (Italy) Francesco Krsul; (South Africa) Juan Dee Oliver; (Italy) Giulio Sari; (Italy) Andrea Visentin; **Fly-halves**: (Italy) Federico Cantini; (South Africa) Brandon Thomson	**Centres**: (Italy) Luca Belloni; (Italy) Lorenzo Elettri; (Argentina) Facundo Diederich Ferrario*(c); (Italy) Matteo Moscardi; (South Africa) Franco Smith jr; **Wings**: (Italy) Lorenzo Maria Bruno; (Argentina) Rafael Andrès Lertora Castro*; (Italy) Paolo Uncini; **Fullbacks**: (Italy) Alessandro Gesi; (Italy) Giovanni Sante
(c) denotes the team captain, **Bold** denotes internationally capped players.^{*} denotes players qualified to play for Italy on residency or dual nationality. Players and their allocated positions from the Rovigo Delta website.

== Selected former players ==
=== Italian players ===
Former players who have played for Rovigo and have caps for Italy:

- (Italy) Matías Agüero
- (Italy) Andrea Bacchetti
- (Italy) Mario Battaglini
- (Italy) Enzo Bellinazzo
- (Italy) Mirko Belloni
- (Italy) Arturo Bergamasco
- (Italy) Mirco Bergamasco
- (Italy) Ottorino Bettarello
- (Italy) Romano Bettarello
- (Italy) Stefano Bettarello
- (Italy) Flaviano Brizzante
- (Italy) Massimo Brunello
- (Italy) Stefano Bordon
- (Italy) Giancarlo Busson
- (Italy) Pablo Canavosio
- (Italy) Carlo Checchinato
- (Italy) David Dal Maso
- (Italy) Elio De Anna
- (Italy) Gianluca Faliva
- (Italy) Simone Favaro
- (Italy) Matteo Ferro
- (Australia) – (Italy) Julian Gardner
- (Italy) Massimo Giovanelli
- (Italy) Andrea Lo Cicero
- (Italy) Tito Lupini
- (Italy) Giancarlo Malosti
- (Italy) Matteo Mazzantini
- (Italy) Alessandro Moscardi
- (Italy) Giancarlo Navarrini
- (Italy) Giacomo Nicotera
- (Italy) Carlo Orlandi
- (Italy) Alberto Osti
- (Italy) Antonio Pavanello
- (Italy) Gert Peens
- (Italy) Isidoro Quaglio
- (Italy) Nicola Quaglio
- (Italy) Graziano Ravanelli
- (Italy) Pietro Reale
- (Italy) Leonardo Sarto
- (Italy) Andrea Scanavacca
- (Italy) Fabrizio Sintich
- (Italy) Pietro Stievano
- (Italy) Iliesa Ratuva Tavuyara
- (Italy) Edgardo Venturi
- (Italy) Angelo Visentin
- (Italy) Narciso Zanella

=== Overseas players ===
Former players who have played for Rovigo and have caps for their respective country:

- (Australia) Peter FitzSimons
- (Australia) Viliami Ofahengaue
- (Argentina) Alejandro Abadie
- (Argentina) Lautaro Bazan Velez
- (Argentina) Manuel Contepomi
- (Argentina) Juan Cruz Legora
- (Argentina) Leandro Lobrauco
- (Argentina) Serafín Dengra
- (Argentina) Juan Pablo Orlandi
- (Canada) – (South Africa) Christian Stewart
- (Georgia (country)) Akvsenti Giorgadze
- (Georgia (country)) Ilia Zedginidze
- (Moldova) Gheorghe Gajion
- (New Zealand) Ron Cribb
- (Romania) Alexandru Penciu
- (Romania) Cristian Săuan
- (South Africa) Nick Mallett
- (South Africa) Stefan Basson
- (South Africa) Schalk van der Merwe
- (South Africa) Schalk Burger Sr.
- (South Africa) Hendro Scholtz
- (South Africa) Naas Botha
- (South Africa) Gert Smal
- (South Africa) AJ Venter
- (Samoa) Silao Leaega
- (Samoa) Elvis Seveali'i
- (United States) Luke Gross
- (Wales) Bernard Thomas

== Presidents ==
Nicola Azzi; Stefano Badocchi; Carlo Bego; Lorenzo (Renzo) Bullo; Giancarlo Checchinato; Lamberto Coltro; Mosè De Stefani; Bruno Granata	Davide (Dino) Lanzoni; Ernesto Marsullo; Ottorino Marzolla; Giuseppe Merlin; Adriano Pavan; Lauro Pavanello; Ercole Ponzetti; Lino Rizzieri	Alessandro Sigolo; Enrico Suriani; Nino Suriani; Ugo Taddeo; Giuseppe Toffoli; Susanna Vecchi; Sergio Viscardini; Francesco Zambelli (in office)

== Bibliography ==
- Gioli, Paolo (1976). Rugby come Rovigo: alè bersaglieri! (in Italian). Rovigo.
- Ravagnani, Luciano; Colosetti, Gianni (1987). Una città in mischia - Mezzo secolo di rugby a Rovigo (in Italian). Rovigo: Istituto Padano di Arti Grafiche.
- Ravagnani, Vason Andriolli Miotto (1979). Rugby Rovigo Capitale (in Italian). Rovigo: La Guida.
- Zanirato, Caterina (2016). Il cuore sotto la maglia. Rugby Rovigo, ottant'anni di sogni da Lanzoni a Zambelli (in Italian). ISBN 9788899479084.
- Guerrini, Alberto; Nalio, Andrea (2025). La partita. La grande storia di Rovigo-Petrarca, il derby d'Italia del rugby (in Italian). ISBN 9788892784376.
- Guerrini, Alberto (2022). Li chiamarono Bersaglieri. I ragazzi che inventarono il rugby a Rovigo e dintorni (in Italian). ISBN 8863412731.
