= Joey Caputo =

- Born: 24 April 2000 (age 26) Canberra, Australia
- Height: 1.82 m (6 ft 0 in)
- Weight: 95 kg (14 st 13 lb; 209 lb)
- School: Marist College
- Notable relative: Marco Caputo (father)

Rugby union career
- Position: Fly-Half
- Current team: Petrarca Padova
Youth career
- Wasps Academy
- –: Brumbies Academy
- –: Marist College
Senior career
Years	Team	Apps	(Points)
2021	Gungahlin Eagles		
2021−2022	Benetton	0	(0)
2022	→Mogliano	4	(0)
2022−2023	Zebre Parma	3	(0)
2023	→Viadana	11	(10)
2023−2024	Petrarca Padova	7	(38)
- Correct as of 28 Jan 2023

Joey Caputo (Canberra, 24 April 2000) is an Australian rugby union player. His usual position is as a fly-half and he currently plays for Petrarca Padova in Italian Serie A Elite.

Caputo signed for Zebre Parma in June 2022 ahead of the 2022–23 United Rugby Championship. He made his debut in Round 4 of the 2022–23 season against the Stormers. From January 2023 to the end of the season, he played also, on loan, for Top10 team Viadana. For 2023–24 season, he played with Petrarca Padova.

In the 2021-22 season, he played for Benetton and on loan for Top10 team Mogliano.
