= Franco Smith (rugby union, born 2000) =

South African rugby union player

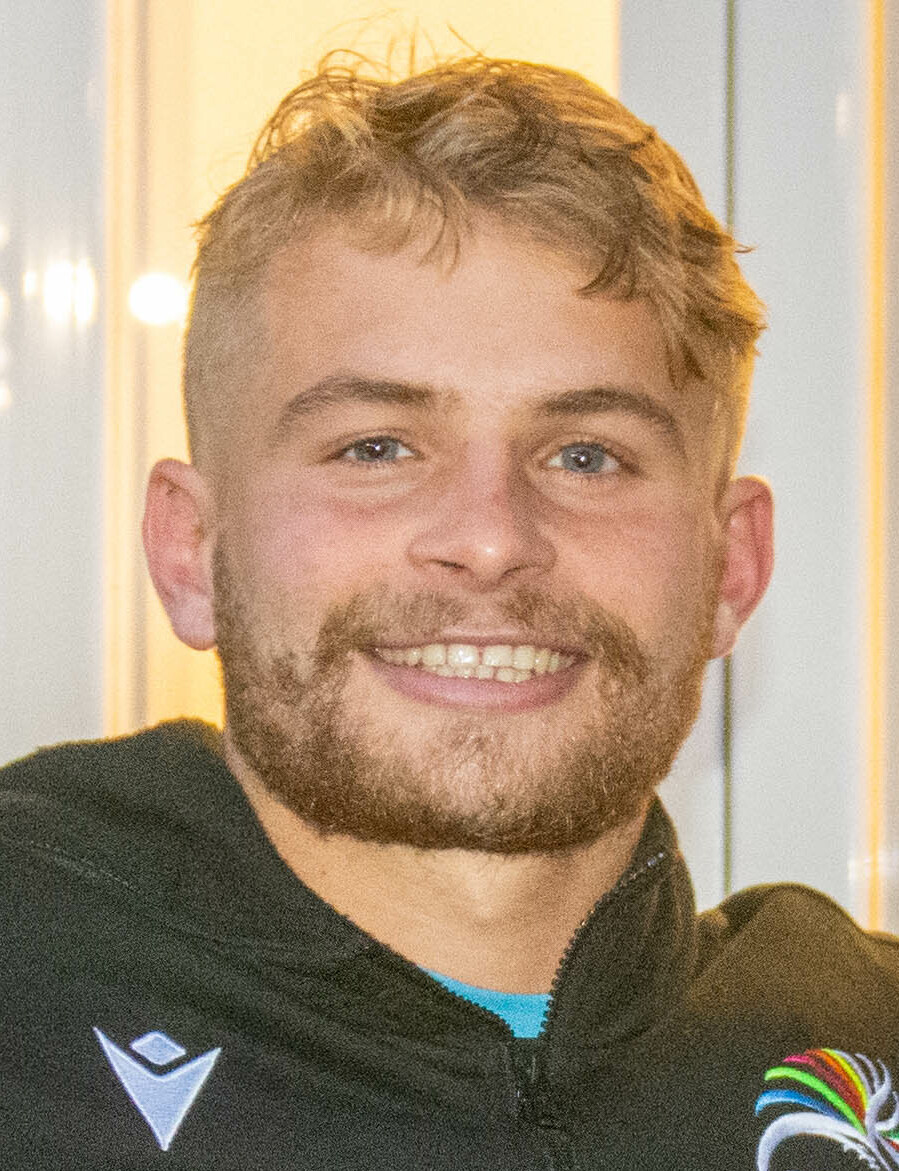
- Born: Petrus François Smith; 3 May 2000 (age 26) Newport, Wales
- Height: 1.82 m (5 ft 11 1/2 in)
- Weight: 96 kg (15.1 st; 212 lb)
- Notable relative(s): Franco Smith (father); Jean Smith (brother)

Rugby union career
- Position: Centre
- Current team: Cheetahs
Youth career
- 2007−2013: Benetton
- 2013−2018: Grey College
- 2018−2020: Cheetahs
Senior career
Years	Team	Apps	(Points)
2020–2021	Colorno	7	(5)
2021–2022	Benetton	0	(0)
2022	→ Zebre Parma	3	(0)
2022–2024	Zebre Parma	20	(10)
2024–	Cheetahs		
- Correct as of 18 Dec 2022

Franco Smith (born 3 May 2000) is a Welsh-born South African rugby union player, currently playing for European Rugby Challenge Cup side Cheetahs. His preferred position is centre. He is the son of former Springbok player and Glasgow Warriors coach Franco Smith, and Welsh and Italian qualified by birth and residency respectively.

Smith was named Permit player for Benetton for the 2021–22 season. He joined Zebre Parma on loan in May 2022. He made his debut in the re-arranged Round 12 of the 2021–22 United Rugby Championship against Cardiff. He played with Italian team Zebre Parma until 2023–24 season.
