= Frank Bradshaw Ryan =

Irish rugby union player (born 1995)

- Born: Frank Bradshaw Ryan; 27 July 1995 (age 31) Limerick, Ireland
- Height: 2.05 m (6 ft 8 1/2 in)
- Weight: 120 kg (19 st; 260 lb)

Rugby union career
- Position: Lock
Senior career
Years	Team	Apps	(Points)
2016–2017	Auch	8	(5)
2017–2022	Nevers	101	(20)
2022–2023	Ulster	1	(0)
2023–2025	Montauban	35	(0)
2025-2026	US Carcassonne	17	(0)
2026–	AZ-COM Maruwa Momotaro's	0	(0)
- Correct as of 8 September 2026

Frank Bradshaw Ryan (born 27 July 1995) is an Irish rugby union player, currently playing for Top 14 side US Montauban. He plays as a lock.

== Career ==
Sometimes known as just Frank Bradshaw, Bradshaw Ryan is from Limerick and was a member of Munster's sub academy, before moving to France in 2016. In France, he first represented Auch, before moving to Nevers in 2017. Between 2017 and 2022, he made over one-hundred appearances in the French Rugby Pro D2. Despite signing a two-year extension with Nevers, he joined Ulster ahead of the 2022–23 United Rugby Championship. After one season with Ulster, he returned to France, signing for US Montauban.

In early September 2026, Ryan joined AZ-COM Maruwa Momotaro's in the Japan Rugby League One, Division 3.
