= 2012 IRB Nations Cup =

Tournament details
- Countries: Argentina XV; Italy A Portugal; Romania; Russia; Uruguay
- Tournament format(s): Modified Round-robin
- Date: 8 – 17 June 2012

Tournament statistics
- Teams: 6
- Matches played: 9
- Attendance: 0 (0 per match)
- Tries scored: 39 (4.33 per match)
- Top point scorer(s): Dorin Manole (Romania) (30 points)
- Top try scorer(s): Andrea Bacchetti (Italy A); Alberto Chiesa (Italy A) (3 tries)

Final
- Champions: Romania (1st title)
- Runners-up: Argentina XV

The 2012 IRB Nations Cup was the seventh edition of the international rugby union tournament, a competition created by the International Rugby Board. It pitted the "A" Teams of the stronger rugby nations (Tier 1, Argentina Jaguars and Italy A) against the Tier 2 (Romania) and Tier 3 (Portugal and Russia) nations. And Uruguay played against Romania, Russia and Portugal.

For the sixth consecutive year the event was held in Bucharest, Romania. South African Kings did not return to defend their title. For the first time in the competition's history, host nation Romania won.

The competition format was a modified round-robin whereby there three ENC teams (Romania, Russia and Portugal) played the other three teams (Argentina XV, Italy A and Uruguay). The competition was played over three match days, with three matches played consecutively on each day.

== Standings ==
2012 IRB Nations Cup
	Team	Played	Won	Drawn	Lost	Points For	Points Against	Points Difference	Tries For	Tries Against	Try Bonus	Losing Bonus	Points
1	Romania	3	3	0	0	69	43	+26	6	3	0	0	12
2	Argentina XV	3	2	0	1	95	41	+54	10	2	1	1	10
3	Italy A	3	2	0	1	74	55	+19	9	7	1	1	10
4	Uruguay	3	1	0	2	57	55	+2	5	6	1	1	6
5	Russia	3	1	0	2	45	79	-34	6	9	0	0	4
6	Portugal	3	0	0	3	37	104	-67	3	12	0	1	1
Source : irb.com Points breakdown: *4 points for a win *2 points for a draw *1 bonus point for a loss by seven points or less *1 bonus point for scoring four or more tries in a match

== Fixtures ==
=== Matchday 1 ===
IRB Reports

8 June 2012
16:00 EET (UTC+02)

Romania	29 – 9	Uruguay
Try: Lemnaru 70' c Fercu 79' c Con: Manole (2/2); Pen: Calafeteanu (4/4) 8', 20', 27', 52'; Manole (1/1) 62'	Stats	Pen: Ormaechea (2/2) 34', 60'; Drop: Berchesi (1/1) 57'

Referee: Andrew Small (England)

8 June 2012
18:00 EET (UTC+02)

Russia	17 – 33	Italy A
Try: Otrokov 10' c Babaev 19' m Selskiy 31' m Con: Sugrobov (1/3)	Stats	Try: Chiesa (2) 6' m, 75' c Bacchetti (2) 35' c, 39' c Morelli 53' c Con: Buso (2/3); Chillon (2/2); Pen: Buso (0/1); Chillon (0/1)

Referee: Peter Fitzgibbon (Ireland)

8 June 2012
20:00 EET (UTC+02)

Portugal	9 – 41	Argentina XV
Pen: Leal (3/4) 9', 35', 41'	Stats	Try: Cortes 24' c De La Fuente 25' c López 54' c Ahaulli 71' c Masera 75' c Con: Iglesias (3/3); Madero (2/2); Pen: Iglesias (2/3) 6', 60'

Referee: Neil Paterson (Scotland)

=== Matchday 2 ===
IRB Reports

12 June 2012
16:00 EET (UTC+02)

Portugal	21 – 28	Italy A
Try: Aguilar 29' m Uva 50' c Con: Leal (1/2); Pen: Leal (3/3) 6', 33', 64'	Stats	Try: Bacchetti 40' m Chillon 55' c Barbini 60' c Con: Chillon (2/3); Pen: Chillon (3/4) 15', 20', 43'

12 June 2012
18:00 EET (UTC+02)

Romania	23 – 21	Argentina XV
Try: Adascalitei 35' c Fercu 48' c Con: Manole (2/2); Pen: Manole (3/3) 3', 14', 44'; Calafeteanu (0/1)	Stats	Try: Masera 62' m Madero 71' c Con: Madero (1/2); Pen: Madero (3/4) 8', 16', 27'

Stadionul Arcul de Triumf, Bucharest
Referee: Peter Fitzgibbon (Ireland)

12 June 2012
20:00 EET (UTC+02)

Russia	19 – 13	Uruguay
Try: Zykov 31' c Kotov 39' m Shakirov 49' c Con: Sugrobov (2/3)	Stats	Try: Arocena 6' c Con: Durán (1/1); Pen: Durán (1/3) 16'; Berchesi (1/2) 54'

Stadionul Arcul de Triumf, Bucharest

=== Matchday 3 ===
IRB Reports

17 June 2012
16:00 EET (UTC+02)

Russia	9 – 33	Argentina XV
Pen: Sugrobov (3/3) 9', 13', 30'	Stats	Try: Basile 70' c Bollini 74' c Ponce 79' c Con: Madero (3/3); Pen: Iglesias (4/4) 27', 32', 35', 49'; Madero (0/1) 67'

Stadionul Arcul de Triumf, Bucharest
Referee: Andrew Small (England)

17 June 2012
18:00 EET (UTC+02)

Portugal	7 – 35	Uruguay
Try: Uva 57' c Con: Leal (1/1); Pen: Leal (0/2) 32', 39'	Stats	Try: Sagario 29' c Ormaechea 35' m Soares 42' c Mieres 78' c Con: Ormaechea (2/3); Berchesi (1/1); Pen: Ormaechea (2/5) 13', 51'; Etcheverry (1/1) 19'; Drop: Berchesi (0/1)

Stadionul Arcul de Triumf, Bucharest
Referee: Peter Fitzgibbon (Ireland)

17 June 2012
20:00 EET (UTC+02)

Romania	17 – 13	Italy A
Try: Manole 15' c Penalty Try 70' c Con: Manole (1/1); Calafeteanu (1/1); Pen: Manole (1/4) 6'; Calafeteanu (0/1)	Stats	Try: Chiesa 75' c Con: Chillon (1/1); Pen: Buso (2/2) 3', 47'

Stadionul Arcul de Triumf, Bucharest
Referee: Neil Paterson (Scotland)

== Top scorers ==
=== Top points scorers ===
Rank	Player	Team	Points
1	Dorin Manole	Romania	30
2	Benjamín Madero	Argentina XV	26
3	Alberto Chillon	Italy A	24
3	Santiago González Iglesias	Argentina XV	24
5	Pedro Leal	Portugal	22
6	Agustín Ormaechea	Uruguay	21
7	Andrea Bacchetti	Italy A	15
7	Alberto Chiesa	Italy A	15
7	Sergey Sugrobov	Russia	15
10	Valentin Calafeteanu	Romania	14

Source: irb.com

=== Top try scorers ===
Rank	Player	Team	Tries
1	Andrea Bacchetti	Italy A	3
1	Alberto Chiesa	Italy A	3
2	Cătălin Fercu	Romania	2
2	Matias Masera	Argentina XV	2
5	28 players, Penalty Try		1

Source: irb.com

== See also ==
- 2012 IRB Pacific Nations Cup
