= World Rugby Nations Cup (2006–2019) =

Rugby competition

- Current season, competition or edition: 2019 World Rugby Nations Cup
- Sport: Rugby union
- Founded: 2006
- No. of teams: 4
- Country: 2018 Teams; Argentina XV; Emerging Italy; Fiji Warriors; Uruguay
- Most recent champion: Uruguay (2019)

The Nations Cup was a rugby union competition that was first held in 2006 at Estádio Universitário in Lisbon with Argentina A, Italy A, Portugal and Russia taking part. The tournament was part of the International Rugby Board's US$50 million Strategic Investment programme, which also includes the Pacific Nations Cup, the Pacific Rugby Cup, and the Americas Rugby Championship (as well as the ARC's predecessor, the North America 4).

== History ==
The Nations Cup aimed at providing more competition for tier one A sides, as well as offering opportunities for second and third-tier nations such as Portugal, Russia, Namibia, Uruguay, Georgia and Romania. The Nations Cup is an important tournament for both Italy and Argentina; at the time of the inaugural competition in 2006, the two sides combined had only nine players who did not play in their respective domestic competitions. The inaugural tournament was won by Argentina A.

The Nations Cup was expanded in 2007, with six teams instead of four. Argentina A and Italy A returned, along with Namibia, Georgia, Romania and the Emerging Springboks. This partly allowed Namibia, Georgia, and Romania to warm up for the 2007 Rugby World Cup. Originally scheduled to take place in the Tineretului Stadium, Bucharest, Romania, in the event the matches took place at the city's Stadionul Arcul de Triumf. The Emerging Springboks were crowned champions, and the Tournament has remained at Arcul de Triumf since then.

In 2008, Argentina A, soon to be rechristened as Argentina Jaguars, left the tournament to play in the Churchill Cup, Namibia also withdrew. Uruguay and Russia took their places. The Emerging Springboks were crowned champions with a 100% record for the second time.

2009 saw the addition of Scotland A and France A to the tournament at the expense of the Emerging Springboks and Georgia, which both had other commitments that year. The Emerging Springboks played the British & Irish Lions during the Lions' tour of South Africa, while Georgia accepted an invitation to the Churchill Cup. Scotland A won that year's edition.

For the 2010 edition, Romania and defending champions Scotland A returned from 2009, as did Italy A. France A, Russia, and Uruguay instead played in the 2010 Churchill Cup. Georgia, returning after a one-year absence, and Namibia and Argentina Jaguars, returning for the first time since 2007, took their places. Namibia emerged as the winner.

The 2011 edition effectively served as a 2011 Rugby World Cup warm-up for host Romania, defending Nations Cup champion Namibia, and Georgia. The Argentina Jaguars also returned from the 2010 edition. Portugal returned for the first time since the inaugural edition in 2006. South Africa made their first appearance since 2008 a successful one, with a team billed as the "South African Kings" — in reality, the Southern Kings, the country's planned future Super Rugby franchise — winning the event.

Southern Kings did not return to defend their title in 2012, nor did Namibia or Georgia return to take part. Instead, Italy A (missing for a year) and Russia and Uruguay (missing for two years) reappeared. Host nation Romania won for the first time in the competition's history. They retained the title in 2013, this time in a four-team round-robin.

Emerging Ireland made their first appearance in the competition in 2014, along with Uruguay, Russia, and host Romania. This edition was important preparation for the 2015 Rugby World Cup.

Namibia made its first appearance since 2011 in 2015 as it began preparing for the 2015 Rugby World Cup. They were joined by Spain, who debuted in the tournament, and the Argentina Jaguars, coached by Argentina's most capped and top point scorer Felipe Contepomi.

The Nations Cup returned in 2026, consisting of the 12 teams that have qualified for the 2027 Men's Rugby World Cup and not including the 12 teams in the 2026 World Rugby Nations Championship.

== Teams ==
The teams that participated in the IRB Nations Cup and their finishing positions are as follows:

Team	2006	2007	2008	2009	2010	2011	2012	2013	2014	2015	2016	2017	2018	2019
Georgia	-	3rd	2nd	-	5th	2nd	-	-	-	-	-	-	-	-
Namibia	-	6th	-	-	1st	4th	-	-	-	4th	3rd	4th	-	4th
Portugal	4th	-	-	-	-	6th	6th	-	-	-	-	-	-	-
Romania	-	4th	3rd	4th	2nd	5th	1st	1st	2nd	1st	1st	-	-	-
Russia	3rd	-	6th	5th	-	-	5th	4th	4th	-	-	2nd	-	2nd
Spain	-	-	-	-	-	-	-	-	-	3rd	6th	5th	-	-
Uruguay	-	-	5th	6th	-	-	4th	-	3rd	-	5th	1st	1st	1st
Argentina Jaguars / XV	1st	2nd	-	-	4th	3rd	2nd	3rd	-	2nd	2nd	3rd	2nd	3rd
Fiji Warriors	-	-	-	-	-	-	-	-	-	-	-	-	4th	-
France A	-	-	-	3rd	-	-	-	-	-	-	-	-	-	-
Emerging Ireland	-	-	-	-	-	-	-	-	1st	-	-	-	-	-
Italy A / Emerging Italy	2nd	5th	4th	2nd	3rd	-	3rd	2nd	-	-	4th	6th	3rd	-
Scotland A	-	-	-	1st	6th	-	-	-	-	-	-	-	-	-
South Africa A	-	1st	1st	-	-	-	-	-	-	-	-	-	-	-
(South Africa) South African Kings	-	-	-	-	-	1st	-	-	-	-	-	-	-	-

== Statistics ==
=== Point scorers ===
Rank	Player	Team	Points
1	Florin Vlaicu	Romania	174
2	Luciano Orquera	Italy A	119
3	Santiago González Iglesias	Argentina XV	71
4	Dănuț Dumbravă	Romania	64
4	Yuri Kushnarev	Russia	64
6	Valentin Calafeteanu	Romania	54
7	Louis Strydom	(South Africa) South African Kings	45
7	Alexander Yanyushkin	Russia	45
9	Cătălin Fercu	Romania	43
10	Peter Grant	South Africa A	44
10	Hernán Senillosa	Argentina XV	44

Last updated: 21 June 2015

=== Try scorers ===
Rank	Player	Team	Tries
1	Cătălin Fercu	Romania	8
2	Siyanda Grey	(South Africa) South African Kings	6
2	Joaquín Tuculet	Argentina XV	6
4	Mihai Macovei	Romania	5
5	Tomás de Vedia	Argentina XV	4
5	Craig Gilroy	Emerging Ireland	4
5	Michele Sepe	Italy A	4
8	Andrea Bacchetti	Italy A	3
8	Tonderai Chavhanga	South Africa A	3
8	Alberto Chiesa	Italy A	3
8	Andrew Conway	Emerging Ireland	3
8	Marius Delport	South Africa A	3
8	Juan Ignacio Gauthier	Argentina XV	3
8	Hernán Senillosa	Argentina XV	3
8	Florin Vlaicu	Romania	3

Last updated: 21 June 2015

== Results ==
Year	Winner	Host
2006	Argentina A	Portugal
2007	South Africa A	Romania
2008	South Africa A	Romania
2009	Scotland A	Romania
2010	Namibia	Romania
2011	(South Africa) South African Kings	Romania
2012	Romania	Romania
2013	Romania	Romania
2014	Emerging Ireland	Romania
2015	Romania	Romania
2016	Romania	Romania
2017	Uruguay	Uruguay
2018	Uruguay	Uruguay
2019	Uruguay	Uruguay

== See also ==
- IRB Pacific Nations Cup
- IRB Tbilisi Cup
- Americas Rugby Championship
- Women's Nations Cup
