= 2006 IRB Nations Cup =

Tournament details
- Countries: Argentina XV; Italy A Portugal; Russia
- Tournament format(s): Round-robin
- Date: 13 – 24 June 2006

Tournament statistics
- Teams: 4
- Matches played: 6
- Attendance: 0 (0 per match)
- Tries scored: 36 (6 per match)

Final
- Champions: Argentina XV (1st title)
- Runners-up: Italy A

The 2006 IRB Nations Cup was the first edition of the international rugby union tournament, a competition created by the International Rugby Board. It pits the "A" Teams of the stronger (Tier 1) rugby nations (Argentina Jaguars and Italy A) against some of the Tier 2 and 3 nations (Romania and Russia).

The tournament took place between 13 and 24 June at Estádio Universitário in Lisbon, Portugal. Argentina Jaguars were the overall winners.

The competition format was a round-robin whereby each team played each of the other 3 teams once. The competition was played over three match days, with two matches played consecutively on each day.

== Final standings ==
2006 IRB Nations Cup
	Team	Played	Won	Drawn	Lost	Points For	Points Against	Points Difference	Tries For	Tries Against	Try Bonus	Losing Bonus	Points
1	Argentina XV	3	3	0	0	114	36	+78	14	2	2	0	14
2	Italy A	3	1	1	1	69	81	-12	8	10	1	0	7
3	Russia	3	1	0	2	72	113	-41	9	14	2	1	7
4	Portugal	3	0	1	2	62	87	-25	5	10	0	1	3
Source : irb.com Points breakdown: *4 points for a win *2 points for a draw *1 bonus point for a loss by seven points or less *1 bonus point for scoring four or more tries in a match

== Results ==
=== Round 1 ===
IRB Report

13 June 2006
16:00 WET (UTC+00)

Argentina XV	26 – 11	Italy A
Try: Senillosa de Vedia; Agulla; Lozada; Con: A.N.Other (3/4)	Report	Try: Travagli; Pen: Orquera (2)

Estádio Universitário, Lisbon

13 June 2006
18:00 WET (UTC+00)

Portugal	17 – 37	Russia
Try: Uva; Diogo Mateus; Con: Leal (2); Pen: Leal (1)	Stats	Try: Grachev; Garbuzov; Trishin (2); Novikov; Con: Novikov (3); Pen: Novikov (2)

Estádio Universitário, Lisbon
Referee: C Damasco (Italy)

=== Round 2 ===
IRB Report

18 June 2006
15:00 WET (UTC+00)

Argentina XV	64 – 6	Russia
Try: Senillosa; Bosch; Petrelli de Vedia (2); Gauthier (2); Agulla; Con: Senillosa (7); Pen: Senillosa (1)	Report	Pen: Kushnarev (2)

Estádio Universitário, Lisbon

18 June 2006
17:00 WET (UTC+00)

Portugal	26 – 26	Italy A
Try: David Mateus; Sousa; Con: Malheiro (1); Pinto (1); Pen: Malheiro (3); Drop: Malheiro (1)	Stats	Try: Nitoglia; Orquera (2); Con: Orquera (1); Pen: Orquera (3)

Estádio Universitário, Lisbon
Referee: F Cuesta (Argentina)

=== Round 3 ===
IRB Report

24 June 2006
15:00 WET (UTC+00)

Italy A	32 – 29	Russia
Try: Spadaro (2); Mandelli; Onitoglia; Con: Orquera (3/4); Pen: Orquera (2)	Stats	Try: Garbouzov (2); Korobeynikov; Fedchenko; Con: Korobeynikov (2); Kushnarev; Pen: Korobeynikov (1)

Estádio Universitário, Lisbon
Referee: Andrew Macpherson (Scotland)

24 June 2006
17:00 WET (UTC+00)

Portugal	19 – 24	Argentina XV
Try: Carvalho; Con: Malheiro (1/1); Pen: Malheiro (4)	Stats	Try: Comerello; Senillosa; Con: Gauthier (1/2); Pen: Gauthier (3); Drop: Senillosa

Estádio Universitário, Lisbon
Referee: Peter Fitzgibbon (IRFU)

== See also ==
- 2006 IRB Pacific 5 Nations
