= Terenure College =

Secondary school for boys, Dublin, Ireland

- Coláiste Thír An Iúir

Location
- Terenure, Dublin 6W; Ireland; 53.3045°N 6.2981°W

Information
- Motto: Zelo Zelatus Sum Pro Domino Deo Exercituum (Latin for "I Am Filled With Zeal, For God, The King Of All Hosts")
- Established: 10 January 1860; 166 years ago
- Principal: Philip Wallace
- Staff: 100
- Years offered: 1st to 6th
- Gender: Male
- Age: 12 to 18
- Enrollment: 744 (2024)
- Colours: Purple, white, and black
- Nickname: Nure / The Gick
- Religious order: Carmelites
- Website: terenurecollege.ie

Terenure College is a Carmelite-run secondary school located in the suburb of Terenure, Dublin, Ireland. The school was founded in 1860 and had an associated primary school until 2017. It is one of the "big six" Leinster Schools Rugby-playing institutions, winning the Leinster Schools Senior Cup 10 times. 80% of the students who sat the Leaving Certificate in 2007 accepted a place in an Irish university.

== History ==
=== Georgian house and estate ===
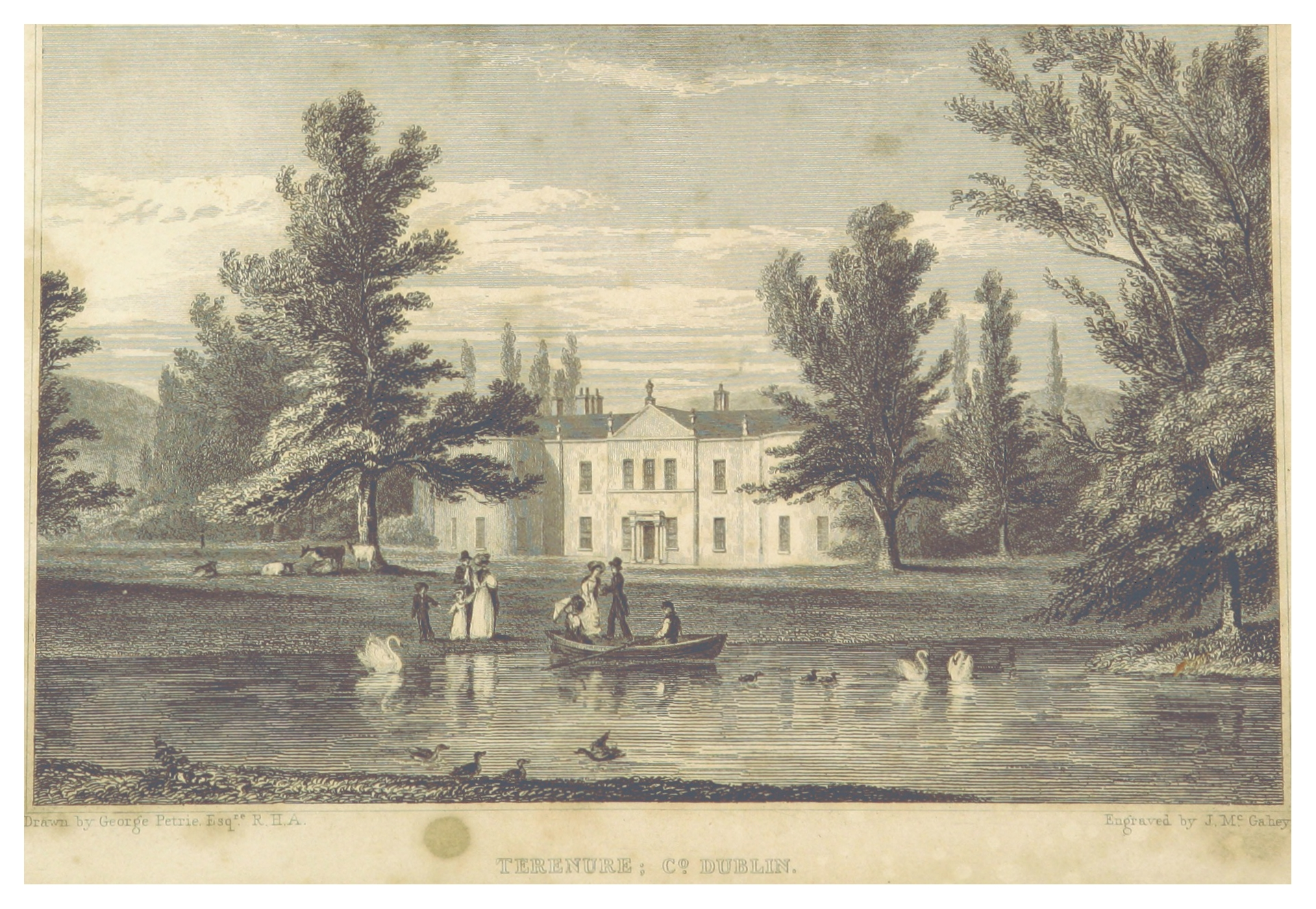
A view of Terenure House from an illustration of 1837.

Prior to the arrival of the Carmelites, Terenure House and estate encompassing 35 acres had been purchased by the banker and politician Sir Robert Shaw, 1st Baronet in 1785 from the estate of the family of Joseph Deane. Two years later work was completed to change the house to its current Georgian twin bay fronted form.

It was later sold by his son, Lieutenant Colonel Robert Shaw, 2nd Baronet in 1806 when he moved the family seat to nearby 110 acre Bushy Park House estate which his wife Maria had brought with her as a dowry. The house was then purchased by Frederick Bourne, the owner of a stage coach business. The Bournes continued to occupy the house until 1857.

=== Carmelite institution ===
Catholic Emancipation was granted in 1829 and the Carmelite order responded to the need for Catholic educators by establishing schools wherever they had friaries. By 1854 practically all Carmelite friaries had primary schools attached.

On January 10, 1860, Terenure House opened as a college with twenty-one pupils on its roll. Between 1870 and 1890 the school was extended to the current main block which house the fifth and sixth year classrooms, and which also include an original stone staircase of the era, but the original clocktower has since been removed due to safety concerns.

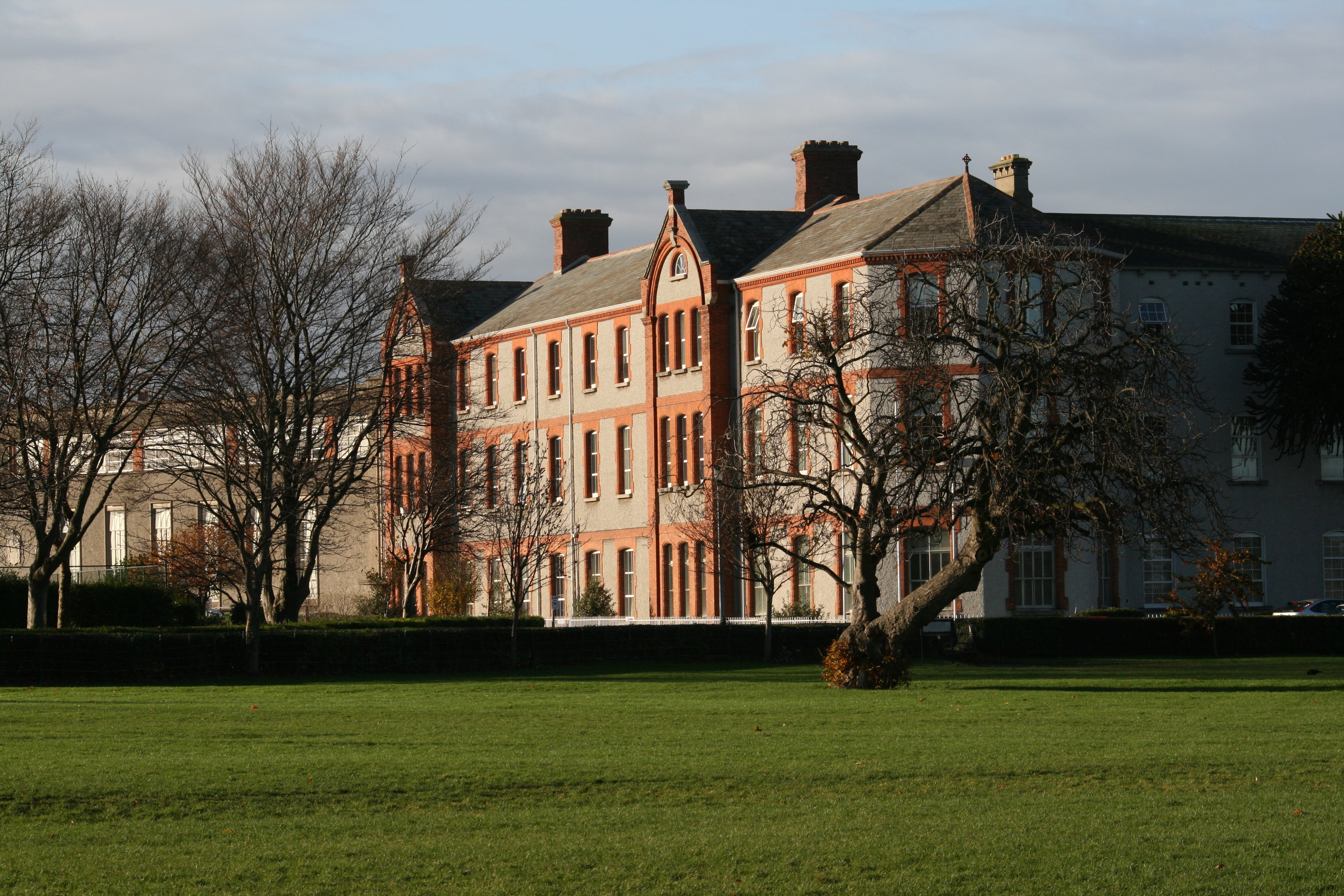
Terenure College

In the 1940s the college identified a need for a new school space, and the so-called "Crush Hall" and concert hall were added to the school, as well as a new Junior School block above the hall. Initially the concert hall was used for both cultural and sporting activities, most notably the College Play, which came to include girls from Our Lady's School, across the road. Since the construction of the 1980s block and the sports hall, the concert hall has been used exclusively for formal and artistic events, such as the school "Debs", plays, concerts and art fairs. The modern school theatre was opened by the President of Ireland Michael D. Higgins in 2013, named in honour of past pupil Donal McCann.

In 2015 it was announced that the Junior School would close after enrollment halved from 2009, and current classes were phased out, with the last class finishing in 2017.

=== Historical account ===
In 2009 a book on the history of the school was published. Entitled "Terenure College 1860-2010: A History," it was compiled by Prof. Fergus D'Arcy, and launched by Taoiseach Brian Cowen.

== Campus ==
Originally built by the Deane family, Terenure House had later passed to the family of George Bernard Shaw, and finally the Bourne family. Nearby was a second house, also owned, by the Shaws, which is now home to Our Lady's School.

The estate holds a lake, and is connected to three rivers. There is an artificial branch watercourse from the River Poddle to the western end of the lake, a culverted outflow, the Olney Stream, to the Swan River system, and a tunnel carries the Lakelands Overflow from the lake to pass under a housing estate, and into Bushy Park, before falling into the River Dodder.

The school has a range of sports facilities, including a swimming pool which offers some public access hours.

== Colours and motto ==
The colours of the school are purple, white, and black, and its motto is Zelo Zelatus Sum Pro Domino Deo Exercituum (Latin for "I Am Filled With Zeal, For God, The King Of All Hosts").

== Extra-curricular activities ==
The school operates a range of sport and non-sport programmes, which it calls "co-curricular" activities:

=== Rugby ===
Rugby has been the leading sport at Terenure College since around 1920. It has had a prolific history in the Leinster Schools Senior Cup, with ten wins to date. Terenure reached both finals of the 2009 Leinster Schools Senior Cup and the Leinster Schools Junior Cup. The school lost out on the former to Blackrock College, 18–9, but won the latter against St Michael's College, Dublin. The school also earned the Powerade Leinster Rugby School of the Year accolade for the school's overall rugby performance.

==== Terenure College RFC ====
Associated with the school is Terenure College RFC, which plays at a senior national level, from a base near the school, and includes past pupils of the school.

=== College run ===
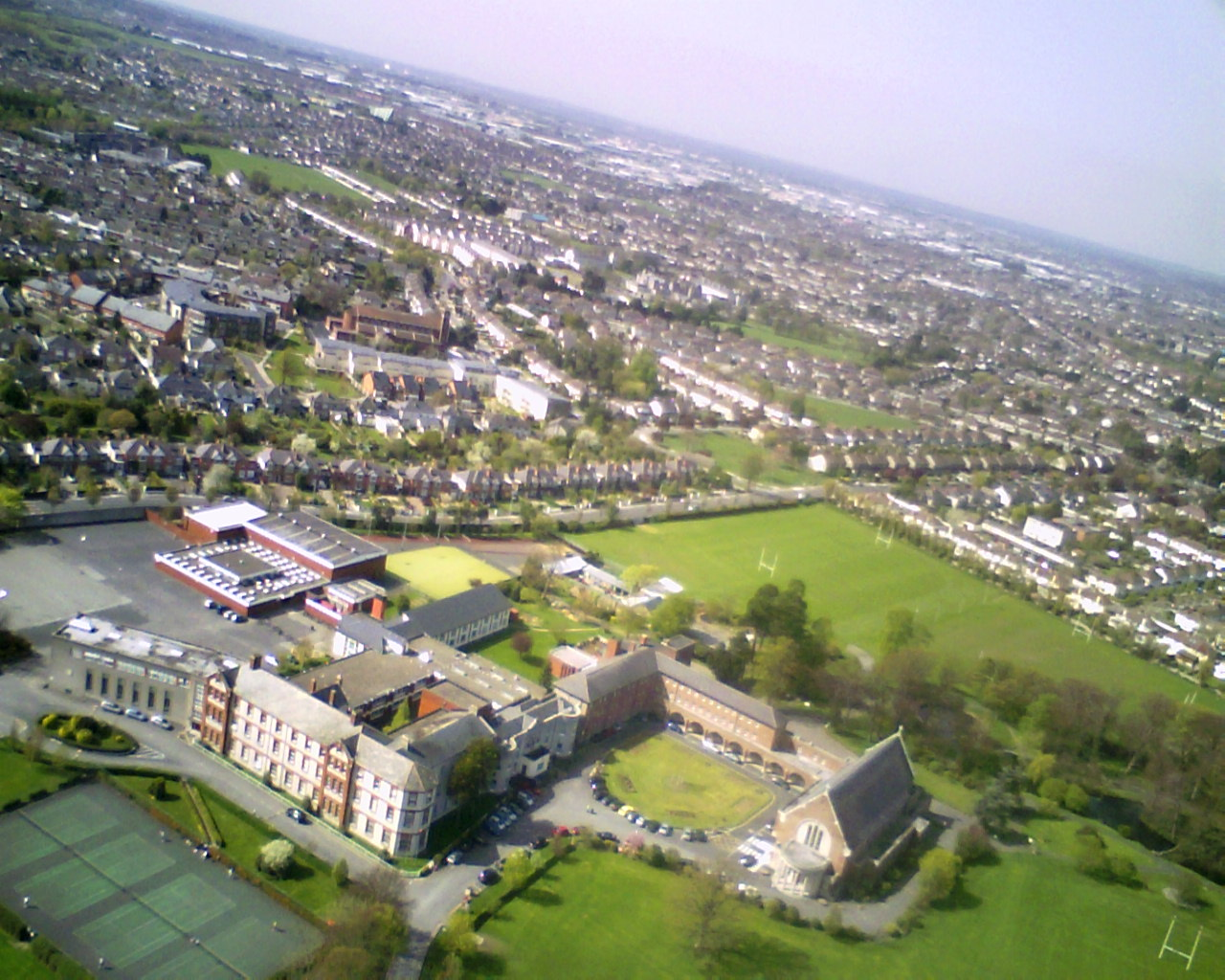
Terenure College in foreground with Templeogue and Kimmage in background

Moate's Carmelite College first held a college run in 1987. Every student in the school participated and the final, which included the fastest runners in the college, was a very competitive event. This became an annual event and a police escort was given for the runners as they made their way through the town, and students lined the route to encourage and cheer on their classmates.

The Terenure College Charity Run was a started as a way to remember a former student and teacher in the school named Fr. Gerry Hipwell O.Carm and to celebrate the 20th anniversary of the President's Award, in which he helped many students to participate. The semi-final including the fastest 2 students in each year and the 15 fastest in the school is held during the first week in May. The fastest 10 students compete in the final and the winner receives the Fr. Gerry Hipwell Memorial Cup.

=== Gaelic games ===
The school is also active in the GAA, having joined in 1885.

=== Swimming ===
The school has its own swimming pool and competes in watersports.

=== Other sports ===
The school is also active in badminton, tennis, cricket, athletics, golf and other sports, in some of which it has won several regional and national competitions.

=== Science and technology ===
The school has a number of supplementary science and information technology programmes. It participates actively in the Young Scientist awards, which were founded by a past staff member and a past pupil, with a pupil, Shane Curran, the overall national winner in 2017.

=== Culture and debate ===
The college has a strong history of drama, with former pupils, such as Dave Allen, Donal McCann and Michael McElhatton, working in the area, and all years are encouraged to participate in drama, including the senior college play, which is conducted with Our Lady's Girls School each year.

Other activities include an Amnesty International group a Young Toastmasters unit, and debating, competing in the Leinster Schools Debating and other regional and national competitions.

==== Model United Nations ====
Terenure College have a very strong background in Model United Nations. They have taken part in the St. Andrew's International Model United Nations (SAIMUN) in Dublin and the Royal Russel School Model United Nations (RRSMUN) in Croydon. Terenure host their own conference, known as TERMUN in early October.

== Alumni ==
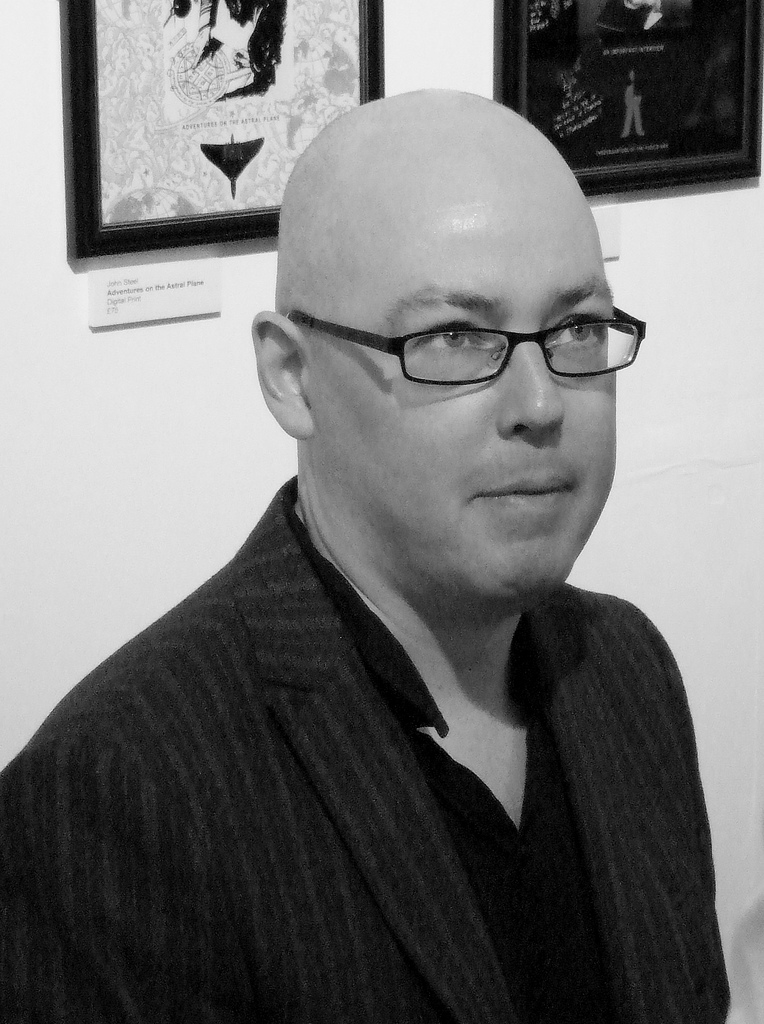
Bestselling author John Boyne, who attended Terenure College in the 1980s

=== Past Pupil's Union ===
The school has an active Past Pupil's Union, which runs a number of social events each year, raises funds for school initiatives, and provides a scholarship program. The union has an office in the school, and a secretary.

=== Past Pupil of the Year Award ===
The school presents an award to recognise high-achieving past pupils, recipients of which have included Girvan Dempsey, Donal McCann, Niall Hogan, Mike Murphy and Lorcan Cranitch.

=== Irish rugby internationals (school or Terenure College RFC) ===
- Billy Dardis — Ireland national rugby sevens player
- Brendan Sherry — former Ireland Rugby player
- Ciaran Clarke — former Ireland Rugby player
- Conor O'Shea — former Ireland Rugby player and head coach of the Italy national rugby union team, now director of performance at the English Rugby Football Union
- Girvan Dempsey — former Ireland Rugby player
- Hubie O'Connor — former Ireland Rugby player
- Mike Hipwell – toured New Zealand in 1971 with the British and Irish Lions
- Niall Hogan — former Ireland Rugby player (captain 1995)
- Paul Haycock — former Ireland Rugby player

=== Other notable alumni ===
- Aidan McArdle — actor
- Anthony Stokes — association football player
- Bosco Hogan — actor
- Brian Blaney — former Leinster rugby player, now a player in Terenure College RFC
- Colm Condon — previous Attorney General of Ireland
- Conal Keaney — Dublin Gaelic footballer
- Danny O'Reilly, Graham Knox and Conor Egan (The Coronas) — musicians (The Coronas rock and indie band)
- Dave Allen — comedian
- David Blaney — Bristol Rugby player
- David Duffy — banker and CEO of Virgin Money
- Derek Daly — Formula One and Indianapolis 500 car racing driver
- Doc Neeson — singer with (The Angels)
- Donal Lamont — Rhodesian bishop, leading anti-apartheid campaigner
- Donal McCann — actor
- Evin Nolan — Irish abstract painter and sculptor
- Fergal Keane — BBC News correspondent and author
- James Blaney — former Leinster and Munster rugby player
- James Hanley – artist, member of Royal Hibernian Academy
- Joe Jacob — Fianna Fáil politician
- John Boyne – novelist, including The Boy in the Striped Pyjamas
- John Crown – oncologist and former senator
- John MacMenamin — former Supreme Court judge
- John Patrick Kenneth Leahy — Carmelite priest and theologian
- JP Doyle — rugby union referee
- Kevin Ryan — actor
- Lorcan Cranitch — actor
- Mark Egan — rugby player and administrator
- Michael Cullen — chairman and chief executive (Beacon Medical Group)
- Michael Elmore-Meegan — missionary, author; co-founder of ICROSS
- Michael McElhatton — actor
- Fr. Míċeál O'Neill O.Carm. — appointed Prior General of the Carmelites in 2019
- Mike Murphy — former RTÉ broadcaster, property developer
- Peter Lawrie — professional golfer
- Philip O'Sullivan — actor
- Seán O'Connor — businessman and former senator
- Shane Curran — entrepreneur and 2017 winner of the Young Scientist and Technology Exhibition, the first in the college's history
- Shane Durkin — former Dublin hurler
- Tony Scott — physicist who along with a former teacher at Terenure Rev. Dr. Tom Burke founded the Young Scientist and Technology Exhibition.

== Sexual abuse ==
Former teacher and first-year form master John McClean was convicted in November 2020 of sexually assaulting 23 pupils in the school between 1973 and 1990. According to victim statements, numerous complaints were made to the school during this time, but were either disbelieved or ignored by the school principal. He was jailed for eight years in February 2021.
