= BMG =

BMG may refer to:

== Organizations ==
=== Music publishing companies ===
- Bertelsmann Music Group, a 1987–2008 division of Bertelsmann that was purchased by Sony on October 1, 2008
  - Sony BMG, a 2004–2008 joint venture of Bertelsmann and Sony that was purchased by Sony in late 2008
  - Sony Music, the purchaser of Sony BMG in 2008 and owner of the rights to its catalog
  - Ariola Records, sometimes known as "BMG Ariola", originally a separate company, acquired in 1987 by Bertelsmann Music Group, then by Sony BMG in 2002, then by Sony Music in 2008
- BMG Rights Management, a company established in late 2008 as a joint venture between Bertelsmann and Kohlberg Kravis Roberts

=== Other organisations ===
- Baader-Meinhof Group, the former name of the Red Army Faction, one of the most violent and prominent left wing groups of post–World War II West Germany
- Badan Meteorologi dan Geofisika, the former name of the Indonesian Agency for Meteorology, Climatology and Geophysics
- Banco BMG, formerly known as Banco de Minas Gerais, a Brazilian bank
- Bank Mendes Gans, a Dutch bank
- Beacon Medical Group, an Irish healthcare company
- Bill & Melinda Gates Foundation, a large U.S. charitable foundation
- Blue Man Group, a (primarily American) performance art group
- BMG Research, a British social research company
- Bohlen, Meyer, Gibson and Associates, an architectural firm in Indianapolis, Indiana
- Borussia Mönchengladbach, a German football club based in Mönchengladbach, North Rhine-Westphalia

== Places ==
- Beth Medrash Govoha, a Haredi yeshiva in Lakewood Township, New Jersey
- Monroe County Airport (Indiana) (IATA code: BMG), a county-owned public-use airport

== Science and technology ==
- Bulk metallic glass (BMG), a type of alloy, amorphous metal
- β2-Microglobulin (BMG) a protein
- benign monoclonal gammopathy (BMG)
- Bedside strip Measurement of venous/capillary blood Glucose (BMG)

== Weaponry ==
- Browning machine gun, various machine gun designs by John Browning
- .50 BMG, a cartridge developed for the Browning .50 caliber machine gun in the late 1910s

== Other uses ==
- BMG (magazine) (Banjo, Mandolin, Guitar), a British magazine founded in 1903 by Clifford Essex
- "Be My Girl", or "B.M.G.", a 2019 song by Keung To and Anson Lo
