= 2007 IRB Nations Cup =

Tournament details
- Countries: Argentina XV; South Africa A Georgia; Italy A Namibia; Romania
- Tournament format(s): Modified Round-robin
- Date: 5 – 16 June 2007

Tournament statistics
- Teams: 6
- Matches played: 9
- Attendance: 2,000 (222 per match)
- Tries scored: 42 (4.67 per match)
- Top point scorer(s): Peter Grant (Emerging Springboks) (44 points)
- Top try scorer(s): Tonderai Chavhanga (Emerging Springboks); Marius Delport (Emerging Springboks) (3 tries)

Final
- Champions: South Africa A (1st title)
- Runners-up: Argentina XV

The 2007 IRB Nations Cup is the second edition of the international rugby union tournament, a competition created by the International Rugby Board. It pits the "A" Teams of the stronger (Tier 1) rugby nations (Argentina Jaguars, Emerging Springboks and Italy A) against some of the Tier 2 and 3 nations (Romania, Namibia and Georgia).

Originally scheduled to take place in the Tineretului Stadium, Bucharest, Romania, in the event the matches took place at the city's Stadionul Arcul de Triumf.

Argentina Jaguars were the defending champions, but the Emerging Springboks were the overall winners.

The competition format was a modified round-robin whereby each team played 3 of the other 5 teams. The competition was played over three match days, with three matches played consecutively on each day.

== Final standings ==
2007 IRB Nations Cup
	Team	Played	Won	Drawn	Lost	Points For	Points Against	Points Difference	Tries For	Tries Against	Try Bonus	Losing Bonus	Points
1	South Africa A	3	3	0	0	109	24	+85	13	3	1	0	13
2	Argentina XV	3	2	0	1	84	57	+27	11	4	1	0	9
3	Georgia	3	2	0	1	55	62	-7	7	6	0	0	8
4	Romania	3	2	0	1	54	85	-31	4	10	0	0	8
5	Italy A	3	0	0	3	48	68	-20	3	8	0	2	2
6	Namibia	3	0	0	3	47	101	-54	4	11	0	0	0
Source : irb.com Points breakdown: *4 points for a win *2 points for a draw *1 bonus point for a loss by seven points or less *1 bonus point for scoring four or more tries in a match

== Results ==
=== Round 1 ===
IRB Report

5 June 2007
15:00 EET (UTC+02)

Argentina XV	27 – 20	Italy A
Try: Amelong; Arocena; Planez; Pen: Fernández (3); Drop: Fernández (1)	Report	Try: Sepe; Pen: Orquera (4); Drop: Orquera (1)

Stadionul Arcul de Triumf, Bucharest

5 June 2007
17:00 EET (UTC+02)

Georgia	26 – 18	Namibia
Try: Didebulidze; Magrakvelidze; Urjukashvili; Con: Kvirikashvili (1); Pen: Kvirikashvili (2); Drop: Kvirikashvili (1)	Stats	Try: Visser van der Westhuizen; Con: Losper (1); Pen: van der Westhuizen (2)

Stadionul Arcul de Triumf, Bucharest
Attendance: 2000
Referee: C Damasco (Italy)

5 June 2007
19:00 EET (UTC+02)

South Africa A	61 – 7	Romania
Try: Brits (2); Chavhanga; Floors (2); Joubert; Vermaak (2); Con: Grant (6); Pen: Grant (3)	Stats	Try: Petre; Con: Vlaicu

Stadionul Arcul de Triumf, Bucharest
Referee: M Fox (England)

=== Round 2 ===
IRB Report

10 June 2007
15:00 EET (UTC+02)

Namibia	13 – 47	Argentina XV
Try: Nieuwenhuis; Con: Losper (1); Pen: Losper (2)	Stats	Try: Ascarate; Camacho (2) de Achaval; Miralles; Sanz; J Stuart; Con: Fernández (3); Pen: Fernández (2)

Stadionul Arcul de Triumf, Bucharest
Referee: Romain Poite (France)

10 June 2007
17:00 EET (UTC+02)

South Africa A	24 – 7	Georgia
Try: Delport (3); Con: Grant (3); Pen: Grant (1)	Stats	Try: Penalty Try; Con: Kvirikashvili (1)

Stadionul Arcul de Triumf, Bucharest
Referee: C Damasco (Italy)

10 June 2007
19:00 EET (UTC+02)

Romania	19 – 8	Italy A
Try: Dumitraș; Fercu; Pen: Calafeteanu (3)	Stats	Try: Rosa; Pen: Marcato (1)

Stadionul Arcul de Triumf, Bucharest
Referee: RS Debney (England)

=== Round 3 ===
IRB Report

16 June 2007
15:00 EET (UTC+02)

Italy A	20 – 22	Georgia
Try: Sepe; Pen: Orquera (5)	Stats	Try: Z Maissuradze; Shkinin; Urjukashvili; Con: Kvirikashvili (2); Pen: Kvirikashvili (1)

Stadionul Arcul de Triumf, Bucharest
Referee: RS Debney (England)

16 June 2007
17:00 EET (UTC+02)

Romania	28 – 16	Namibia
Try: Brezoianu; Con: Calafeteanu (1); Pen: Calafeteanu (5); Drop: Calafeteanu (1); Vlaicu (1)	Stats	Try: du Plessis; Con: Losper (1); Pen: Losper (3)

Stadionul Arcul de Triumf, Bucharest
Referee: Romain Poite (France)

16 June 2007
19:00 EET (UTC+02)

South Africa A	24 – 10	Argentina XV
Try: Chavhanga (2); Con: Grant (1); Pen: Grant (3); Drop: Grant (1)	Report	Try: D Stuart; Con: Fernández (1); Pen: Fernández (1)

Stadionul Arcul de Triumf, Bucharest

== Top scorers ==
=== Top points scorers ===
Rank	Player	Team	Points
1	Peter Grant	South Africa A	44
2	Luciano Orquera	Italy A	30
3	Valentin Calafeteanu	Romania	29
3	Santiago Fernández	Argentina XV	29
5	Tertius Losper	Namibia	21
6	Merab Kvirikashvili	Georgia	20
7	Tonderai Chavhanga	South Africa A	15
7	Marius Delport	South Africa A	15
9	Justinus van der Westhuizen	Namibia	11

Source: irb.com

=== Top try scorers ===
Rank	Player	Team	Tries
1	Tonderai Chavhanga	South Africa A	3
1	Marius Delport	South Africa A	3
3	Schalk Brits	South Africa A	2
3	Gonzalo Camacho	Argentina XV	2
3	Kabamba Floors	South Africa A	2
3	Michele Sepe	Italy A	2
3	Malkhaz Urjukashvili	Georgia	2
3	Jano Vermaak	South Africa A	2
9	23 players, 1 Penalty Try		1

Source: irb.com

== See also ==
- 2007 IRB Pacific Nations Cup
