= 2009 IRB Nations Cup =

Tournament details
- Countries: France A Italy A Romania; Russia; Scotland A Uruguay
- Tournament format(s): Modified Round-robin
- Date: 12 – 21 June 2009

Tournament statistics
- Teams: 6
- Matches played: 9
- Attendance: 0 (0 per match)
- Tries scored: 40 (4.44 per match)
- Top point scorer(s): Riccardo Bocchino (Italy A) (39 points)
- Top try scorer(s): Scott Lawson (Scotland A); Romain Martial (France A); Jim Thompson (Scotland A); Manoa Vosawai (Italy A); Simon Webster (Scotland A); Alexander Yanyushkin (Russia) (2 tries)

Final
- Champions: Scotland A (1st title)
- Runners-up: Italy A

The 2009 IRB Nations Cup was the fourth edition of the international rugby union tournament, a competition created by the International Rugby Board. It pits the "A" Teams of the stronger (Tier 1) rugby nations (France A, Italy A and Scotland A) against some of the Tier 2 and 3 nations (Romania, Russia and Uruguay).

For the third consecutive year the event was held in Bucharest, Romania. Emerging Springboks did not return to defend their title. Scotland A were the overall winners of the tournament.

The competition format was a modified round-robin whereby each team played 3 of the other 5 teams. The competition was played over three match days, with three matches played consecutively on each day.

== Final standings ==
2009 IRB Nations Cup
	Team	Played	Won	Drawn	Lost	Points For	Points Against	Points Difference	Tries For	Tries Against	Try Bonus	Losing Bonus	Points
1	Scotland A	3	3	0	0	98	22	+76	12	1	1	0	13
2	Italy A	3	2	0	1	74	47	+27	8	6	1	0	9
3	France A	3	2	0	1	63	53	+10	7	2	1	0	9
4	Romania	3	1	0	2	46	55	-9	4	6	0	1	5
5	Russia	3	1	0	2	39	110	-71	5	15	1	0	5
6	Uruguay	3	0	0	3	40	73	−33	3	9	0	2	2
Source : irb.com Points breakdown: *4 points for a win *2 points for a draw *1 bonus point for a loss by seven points or less *1 bonus point for scoring four or more tries in a match

== Fixtures ==
=== Round 1 ===
Report

12 June 2009
16:00 EET (UTC+02)

Italy A	15 – 31	France A
Pen: Bocchino (5/5) 11', 17', 39', 60', 67'	Stats	Try: Mazars 14' m Martial 21' c Tomas 35' c Estebanez 61' c Montes 78' m Con: Estebanez (3/5)

Stadionul Arcul de Triumf, Bucharest
Referee: John Lacey (Ireland)

12 June 2009
18:00 EET (UTC+02)

Scotland A	49 – 7	Russia
Try: Dewey 1' m Thompson (2) 6' m, 22' m Kellock 12' c Lawson 34' m Cusiter 46' m Jackson 47' m MacDonald 53' m Cairns 59' c Con: Jackson (2/9); Pen: Jackson (1/1) 21'	Stats	Try: Luhin 37' c Con: Kushnarev (1/1)

Stadionul Arcul de Triumf, Bucharest
Referee: Chris Draper (United States)

12 June 2009
20:00 EET (UTC+02)

Uruguay	11 – 17	Romania
Try: Campomar 69' m Pen: Etcheverry (2/2) 6', 39'	Stats	Try: Vlaicu 8' c Manta 21' c Con: Vlaicu (2/2); Pen: Vlaicu (1/1) 4'

Stadionul Arcul de Triumf, Bucharest
Referee: David Smortchevsky (Canada)

=== Round 2 ===
Report

16 June 2009
16:00 EET (UTC+02)

Scotland A	27 – 3	Uruguay
Try: Webster (2) 19' c, 52' c Lawson 70' c Con: Blair (3/3); Pen: Blair (2/2) 39', 45'	Stats	Drop: Etcheverry 64'

Stadionul Arcul de Triumf, Bucharest
Referee: JP Doyle (England)

16 June 2009
18:00 EET (UTC+02)

Italy A	35 – 3	Russia
Try: Bocchino 19' c Ravalle 41' c Sepe 48' c Vosawai (2) 70' c, 79' c Con: Bocchino (5/5)	Stats	Pen: Kushnarev 42'

Stadionul Arcul de Triumf, Bucharest
Referee: David Smortchevsky (Canada)

16 June 2009
20:00 EET (UTC+02)

France A	20 – 16	Romania
Try: Martial 20' c Forestier 24' c Con: Porical (2/2); Pen: Porical 11'; Audy 80'	Stats	Try: Dumitras 49' c Con: Vlaicu (1/1); Pen: Dumitras (1/1) 31'; Vlaicu (2/2) 44', 60'

Stadionul Arcul de Triumf, Bucharest
Referee: John Lacey (Ireland)

=== Round 3 ===
Report

21 June 2009
16:00 EET (UTC+02)

Russia	29 – 26	Uruguay
Try: Ostroushko 7' m Yanyushkin (2) 35' c, 60' c Bazhenov 49' c Con: Yanyushkin (2/3); Kushnarev (1/1); Pen: Yanyushkin (1/1) 47'	Stats	Try: Sanchez 38' c Espiga 77' c Con: Morales (1/1); Etcheverry (1/1); Pen: Etcheverry (2/2) 23', 65'; Morales (1/1) 59'; Drop: Etcheverry (1) 5'

Stadionul Arcul de Triumf, Bucharest
Referee: Chris Draper (United States)

21 June 2009
18:00 EET (UTC+02)

Italy A	24 – 13	Romania
Try: Pavanello 64' c Pratichetti 69' c Bacchetti 79' c Con: Bocchino (3/3); Pen: Bocchino (1/1) 30'	Stats	Try: Calafeteanu 52' c Con: Vlaicu (1/1); Pen: Vlaicu (2/2) 27', 43'

Stadionul Arcul de Triumf, Bucharest
Referee: John Lacey (Ireland)

21 June 2009
20:00 EET (UTC+02)

France A	12 – 22	Scotland A
Pen: Estebanez (3/3) 28', 47', 56'; Drop: Lespinas (1/1) 61'	Stats	Try: Vernon 71' c Con: Jackson (1/1); Pen: Jackson (5/5) 3', 13', 20', 39', 44'

Stadionul Arcul de Triumf, Bucharest
Referee: JP Doyle (England)

== Top scorers ==
=== Top points scorers ===
Rank	Player	Team	Points
1	Riccardo Bocchino	Italy A	39
2	Ruaridh Jackson	Scotland A	29
3	Florin Vlaicu	Romania	28
4	Fabrice Estebanez	France A	20
4	Jeronimo Etcheverry	Uruguay	20
6	Alexander Yanyushkin	Russia	17
7	David Blair	Scotland A	12
8	Scott Lawson	Scotland A	10
8	Romain Martial	France A	10
8	Jim Thompson	Scotland A	10
8	Manoa Vosawai	Italy A	10
8	Simon Webster	Scotland A	10

Source: irb.com

=== Top try scorers ===
Rank	Player	Team	Tries
1	Scott Lawson	Scotland A	2
1	Romain Martial	France A	2
1	Jim Thompson	Scotland A	2
1	Manoa Vosawai	Italy A	2
1	Simon Webster	Scotland A	2
1	Alexander Yanyushkin	Russia	2
7	28 players		1

Source: irb.com

== See also ==
- 2009 IRB Pacific Nations Cup
