= 2008 European Sevens Championship =

Tournament details
- Host nation: GER
- Dates: July 12 – July 13
- No. of nations: 12

Final positions
- Champions: Portugal
- Runner-up: Wales

Tournament statistics
- Matches played: 42
- Top scorer(s): (Portugal) Pedro Leal

The 2008 European Sevens Championship was a rugby sevens competition, with the final held in Hanover, Germany. It was the seventh edition of the European Sevens championship and also functioned as a qualifying tournament for the 2009 Rugby World Cup Sevens. The event was organised by rugby's European governing body, the FIRA – Association of European Rugby (FIRA-AER).

== Outcome ==
The finals tournament held in Hanover, Germany on 12 and 13 July 2008, as well as being the European Sevens Championship, functioned as a qualifying tournament for the world cup. England, France and Scotland had already qualified through their past performance. The five best nations out of the twelve participating ones qualified for the Dubai tournament. Teams finished in the following order:

Place	Country
1st	Portugal
2nd	Wales
3rd	Georgia
4th	Ireland
5th	Italy
6th	Spain
7th	Germany
8th	Ukraine
9th	Russia
10th	Romania
11th	Poland
12th	Belgium

== Bid ==
On 16 June 2007, the FIRA congress in Monaco decided to award the finals tournament to Hanover, beating bids from Russia, Greece and Bosnia-Herzegovina in the process.

== Tournament history ==
From 2002, FIRA, the governing body of European rugby, has been organising an annual European Sevens Championship tournament. A number of qualifying tournaments lead up to a finals tournament, which functions as the European championship and, in 2008, also as the qualifying stage for the Sevens World Cup.

The first European Championship was held in 2002 in Heidelberg, Germany, and was won by Portugal, the team that won every championship since except 2007, when Russia won.

The next year, the tournament was again held in Heidelberg and in 2004, Palma de Mallorca, Spain was the host.

From 2005 to 2007, Moscow was the host of the tournament.

Hanover held the tournament for the first time in 2008 and will do so again in 2009.

== Tournament ==
=== Stadium ===
The finals tournament was held at the AWD-Arena in Hanover, home ground of the football club Hannover 96. The stadium holds 50.000 spectators, 43,000 of them on seats, the rest standing.

The tournament was seen by over 30,000 spectators, a good turn out in a country like Germany, where rugby is not a mainstream sport. After selling more than 35,000 tickets in advance, mostly within Germany, the organisers were forced to open up the upper tier of the stadium to meet demand.

=== Qualifying ===
Twelve teams qualified through the seven qualifying tournaments, held at the following locations:

Location	Country	Date	Winner	Runner-up
Odense	Denmark	10–11 May	Wales	Ireland
Sopot	Poland	24–25 May	Ireland	Poland
Zagreb	Croatia	31 May-1 June	Italy	Germany
Tbilisi	Georgia	7–8 June	Wales	Ukraine
Ostrava	Czech Republic	14–15 June	Portugal	Spain
Corfu	Greece	20–21 June	Spain	Russia
Moscow	Russia	28–29 June	Portugal	Russia

Source:"Qualifying". Hanover Sevens website.

=== Group stage ===
The tournament was divided into a group and a finals stage. In the group stage, two groups of six teams were drawn. Within each group, each team played each other once. The top two teams went to the Cup stage of the tournament while the third and fourth placed team qualified for the Plate stage. Five and six went to the Bowl finals.

Qualified for the Cup stage
Qualified for the Plate stage
Qualified for the Bowl stage

==== Group A ====
	POR	GEO	ESP	GER	RUS	ROM
Portugal	–	26–10	28–5	14–12	45–5	38–0
Georgia	–	–	28–5	26–0	5–0	12–0
Spain	–	–	–	26–22	7–29	14–0
Germany	–	–	–	–	17–12	24–21
Russia	–	–	–	–	–	19–19
Romania	–	–	–	–	–	–

Team	Pld	W	D	L	PF	PA	+/-	Pts
Portugal	5	5	0	0	151	32	+119	15
Georgia	5	4	0	1	81	31	+50	13
Spain	5	2	0	3	57	107	-50	9
Germany	5	2	0	3	75	99	-24	9
Russia	5	1	1	3	74	100	-26	8
Romania	5	0	1	4	31	100	-69	6

==== Group B ====
	WAL	IRE	ITA	UKR	POL	Bel
Wales	–	26–14	33–12	21–17	38–7	33–12
Ireland	–	–	17–12	26–7	17–7	31–0
Italy	–	–	–	31–15	40–0	17–10
Ukraine	–	–	–	–	21–14	22–12
Poland	–	–	–	–	–	21–19
Belgium	–	–	–	–	–	–

Team	Pld	W	D	L	PF	PA	+/-	Pts
Wales	5	5	0	0	151	64	+87	15
Ireland	5	4	0	1	105	52	+53	13
Italy	5	3	0	2	114	75	+39	11
Ukraine	5	2	0	3	84	104	-20	9
Poland	5	1	0	4	49	135	-86	7
Belgium	5	0	0	5	53	124	-71	5

=== Finals ===
Three separate rounds of finals were held, Bowl, the lowest, Plate and Cup. The semi final winners of each group went on to the final while the losers played each other. All teams from the Cup stage were qualified for the next sevens world cup and also the Plate winner.

==== Bowl ====
Winner: Russia

Semi-finals
Russia	27
Belgium	0
Poland	7
Romania	21

Final
Russia	29
Romania	12
3rd place
Belgium	0
Poland	26

==== Plate ====
Winner: Italy (qualified for the 2009 Sevens world cup)

Semi-finals
Spain	22
Ukraine	10
Italy	21
Germany	19

Final
Spain	17
Italy	24
3rd place
Ukraine	14
Germany	35

==== Cup ====
Winner: Portugal (all four teams qualified for the 2009 Sevens world cup)

Semi-finals
Portugal	14
Ireland	12
Wales	19
Georgia	14

Final
Portugal	26
Wales	12
3rd place
Ireland	7
Georgia	26

== Top point scorers ==
Points	Name	Team	Tries	Con	Pen	Drop
74	Pedro Leal	Portugal	6	22	0	0
52	Merab Kvirikashvili	Georgia	6	11	0	0
45	Martin Roberts	Wales	5	10	0	0
38	Ian Keatley	Ireland	4	9	0	0
36	Mustafa Güngör	Germany	4	8	0	0
35	Oleh Kvasnytsya	Ukraine	7	0	0	0
31	Andrew Maxwell	Ireland	5	3	0	0
31	Alexander Gvozdovskiy	Russia	3	8	0	0
30	Juan Cano	Spain	6	0	0	0
29	César Sempere	Spain	3	7	0	0
28	Matthieu Franke	Germany	4	4	0	0

Key: Con = conversions; Pen = penalties; Drop = drop goals

== Teams ==
=== Belgium ===
Head coach: Neil Massinon

Manager: Thierry Massinon

Player	Club
Mathieu Verschelden	(Belgium) ASUB Waterloo
Alexandre Van Pestel	(Belgium) R.S.C. Anderlecht
Johann Bombaerts	(Belgium) ROC Ottignies
Jérémy Maes	(Belgium) ASUB Waterloo
Kevin Williams	(Republic of Ireland) Seapoint
David Nemsadze	(France) Domont
Morgan Croisy	(Belgium) ASUB Waterloo
Jérôme Cauwe	(Belgium) ASUB Waterloo
Simon Marote	(France) Arras
Neil Massinon	(Belgium) Brussels Barbarians
Jerôme Bize	(France) Tours

Source:"Team Belgium". Hanover Sevens website. Archived from the original on 2008-08-09.

=== Georgia ===
Head coach: Kakhaber Alania

Player	Club
Shalva Sutiashvili	(France) AC Bobigny 93 Rugby
Simon Maisuradze	(France) ASM Clermont Auvergne
Giorgi Chkhaidze	(France) Massy
Bidzina Samkharadze	(Romania) FC Farul Constanţa
Merab Kvirikashvili	(France) Section Paloise
Alexander Todua	(Georgia (country)) Lelo
Giorgi Shkinini	(Georgia (country)) Hooligana
Jaba Bregvadze	(Georgia (country)) Kochebi
Lasha Khmaladze	(Georgia (country)) Lelo
Alexander Nizharadze	(Georgia (country)) Kochebi
Beka Tsiklauri	
Irakli Gundishvili	(France) Périgueux

Source:"Team Georgia". Hanover Sevens website.

=== Germany ===
Head coach: (New Zealand) Lofty Stevenson

Player	Club
Franck Moutsinga	(Germany) Berliner RC
Mustafa Güngör	(Germany) RG Heidelberg
Tim Kasten	(England) Southend RFC
Markus Walger	(Germany) RK Heusenstamm
Clemens von Grumbkow	(France) RC Orléans
Christopher Weselek	(Germany) RG Heidelberg
Matthieu Franke	(France) RC Orléans
Alexander Pipa	(Germany) TSV Handschuhsheim
Benjamin Simm	(Germany) DSV 78/08 Ricklingen
Mike Härtel	(Germany) TSV Victoria Linden
Stefan Kunde	(Germany) SC 1880 Frankfurt
Benjamin Krause	(Germany) DSV 78/08 Ricklingen

Source:"Team Germany". Hanover Sevens website.

=== Ireland ===
Head coach: Jon Skurr

Player	Club
Cian Aherne	(Republic of Ireland) Leinster
Richard Briggs	(England) Esher RFC
Kieran Campbell	(Republic of Ireland) Connacht
Darren Cave	(Republic of Ireland) Ulster
James Coughlan	(Republic of Ireland) Munster
Eoghan Grace	
Chris Henry	(Republic of Ireland) Ulster
Ian Keatley	(Republic of Ireland) Connacht
Seamus Mallon	(Republic of Ireland) Ulster
Conor McPhillips	(Republic of Ireland) Connacht
Andrew Maxwell	(Scotland) Edinburgh
Brian Tuohy	(England) Cornish Pirates

Source:"Team Ireland". Hanover Sevens website.

=== Italy ===
Head coach:

Player	Club
Kris Burton	(France) RC Orléans
Benjamin De Jager	(Italy) Benetton Treviso
Gabriele Gentile	(Italy) Unione Rugby Capitolina
Alvaro Lopez-Gonzalez	(Italy) Petrarca Padova Rugby
Antonio Mannato	(Italy) Gran Parma Rugby
Roberto Mariani	(Italy) Rugby Viadana
Alessandro Onori	(Italy) Gran Parma Rugby
Davide Pastormerlo	(Italy) Rugby Rovigo
Tomas Pucciariello	(France) Rouen
Michele Sepe	(Italy) Unione Rugby Capitolina
Marko Stanojevic	(Italy) Rugby Calvisano
Benjamin Tomaghelli	(Italy) US Rugby Brescia

Source:"Team Italy". Hanover Sevens website.

=== Poland ===
Head coach:

Player	Club
Tomasz Grodecki	(Poland) Budowlani Łódź
Maciej Maciejewski	(Poland) Budowlani Łódź
Artur Maros	(Poland) Budowlani Łódź
Tomasz Kozakiewicz	(Poland) Budowlani Łódź
Rafał Janeczko	(Poland) Folc AZS Warszawa
Wojciech Łukasiewicz	(Poland) Folc AZS Warszawa
Jakub Lisiewski	(Poland) Folc AZS Warszawa
Mariusz Motyl	(Poland) Arka Gdynia
Marek Płonka	(Poland) Lechia Gdańsk
Patryk Narwojsz	(Poland) Czarni Pruszcz Gdański
Dawid Banaszek	(France) CS Bourgoin-Jallieu
Donald Gargasson	(France) ASM Clermont Auvergne

Source:"Team Poland". Hanover Sevens website.

=== Portugal ===
Head coach: (Portugal) Tomaz Morais

Player	Club
Aderito Esteves	
David Mateus	(Portugal) C.F. Os Belenenses
Goncalo Foro	
Vasco Uva	(France) Montpellier Hérault RC
Pedro Silva	
Pedro Leal	
Antonio Pinto	
Diogo Mateus	(Portugal) C.F. Os Belenenses
Frederico Oliveira	
Pedro Cabral	(Portugal) CDUL
Sebastiao Cunha	
Antonio Aguilar	

Source:"Team Portugal". Hanover Sevens website.

=== Romania ===
Head coach:

Player	Club
Carl Cimpoias	(England) Henley Hawks
Florin Vlaicu	(Romania) Steaua Bucuresti
Bogdan Bradu	(Romania) RC Timișoara
Florin Surugiu	(Romania) Olimpia Bucuresti
Andrei Filip	(Romania) Dinamo București
Ionuț Florea	(Romania) FC Farul Constanta
Mădălin Lemnaru	(Romania) RC Brasov
Viorel Lucaci	(Romania) U. Baia Mare
Valentin Ivan	(Romania) Dinamo București
Marian Dumitru	(Romania) FC Farul Constanta
Daniel Nainer	(Romania) Steaua Bucuresti
Razvan Suteu	(Romania) Grivita Bucuresti

Source:"Team Romania". Hanover Sevens website.

=== Russia ===
Head coach: (France) Claude Saurel

Player	Club
Evgeny Bystryakov	"Slava" Moscow
Igor Galinovskiy	"Krasniy Yar" Krasnoyarsk
Andrey Kuzin	"VVA-Podmoskovje" Moscow region
Andrey Garbuzov	"Krasniy Yar" Krasnoyarsk
Evgeny Matveev	"VVA-Podmoskovje" Moscow region
Alexey Panasenko	"VVA-Podmoskovje" Moscow region
Yuri Kushnarev	"VVA-Podmoskovje" Moscow region
Alexander Shakirov	"VVA-Podmoskovje" Moscow region
Alexander Gvozdovskiy	"Krasniy Yar" Krasnoyarsk
Oleg Kobzev	"VVA-Podmoskovje" Moscow region
Victor Gresev	"VVA-Podmoskovje" Moscow region
Sergey Gavryushin	"VVA-Podmoskovje" Moscow region

Source:"Team Russia". Hanover Sevens website.

=== Spain ===
Head coach: José Ignacio Inchausti

Player	Club
Jaime Nava	(Spain) Club Alcobendas Rugby
Diego Á. Gorosito	(Spain) Valladolid RAC
Rafael Camacho	(Spain) CAR Inés Rosales
Juan Cano	(Spain) CR Cisneros
Javier Canosa	(Spain) CRC Madrid Noroeste
Pablo Feijoo	(England) Leicester Tigers
Sergi Guerrero	(Spain) UE Santboiana
Facundo Lavino	(Spain) CRC Madrid Noroeste
Víctor Marlet	(Spain) UE Santboiana
Ignacio Martín	(Spain) Bera Bera RT
Pedro Martín	(Spain) Valladolid RAC
Cesar Sempere	(Spain) CRC Madrid Noroeste

Source:"Team Spain". Hanover Sevens website.

=== Ukraine ===
Head coach: Michel Bishop

Player	Club
Ruslan Tserkovnyy	(Ukraine) Kredo-63 Odesa
Vitaly Orlov	(Russia) Enisey-STM
Maksim Kravchenko	(Ukraine) Olimp Kharkiv
Sergey Tserkovnyy	(Ukraine) Olimp Kharkiv
George Gegidze	(Ukraine) Kredo-63 Odesa
Oleg Kvasnitsa	(Ukraine) Obolon-Universitet Khmelnytskyi
Jaba Malaguradze	(Ukraine) Kredo-63 Odesa
Vyacheslav Ponamorenko	(Ukraine) Olimp Kharkiv
Alexandr Lubyy	(Ukraine) Olimp Kharkiv
Giorgi Todradze	(Ukraine) Kredo-63 Odesa
Bogdan Zhulavskyi	(Ukraine) Kredo-63 Odesa

Source:"Team Ukraine". Hanover Sevens website.

=== Wales ===
Head coach: (Wales) Gareth Baber

Player	Club
Johnathan Edwards	(Wales) Scarlets
Lee Beach	(Wales) Neath RFC
Rhodri McAtee	(England) Cornish Pirates
Lee Williams	(Wales) Scarlets
Martin Roberts	(Wales) Scarlets
James Lewis	(Wales) Newport Gwent Dragons
Gareth Chapman	(Wales) Cardiff RFC
Alec Jenkins	(England) London Welsh RFC
James Merriman	(Wales) Neath RFC
Dafydd Hewitt	(Wales) Cardiff Blues
Andy Powell	(Wales) Cardiff Blues
Richie Pugh	(Wales) Cardiff RFC

Source:"Team Wales". Hanover Sevens website.
