= JP Doyle =

Irish rugby union referee

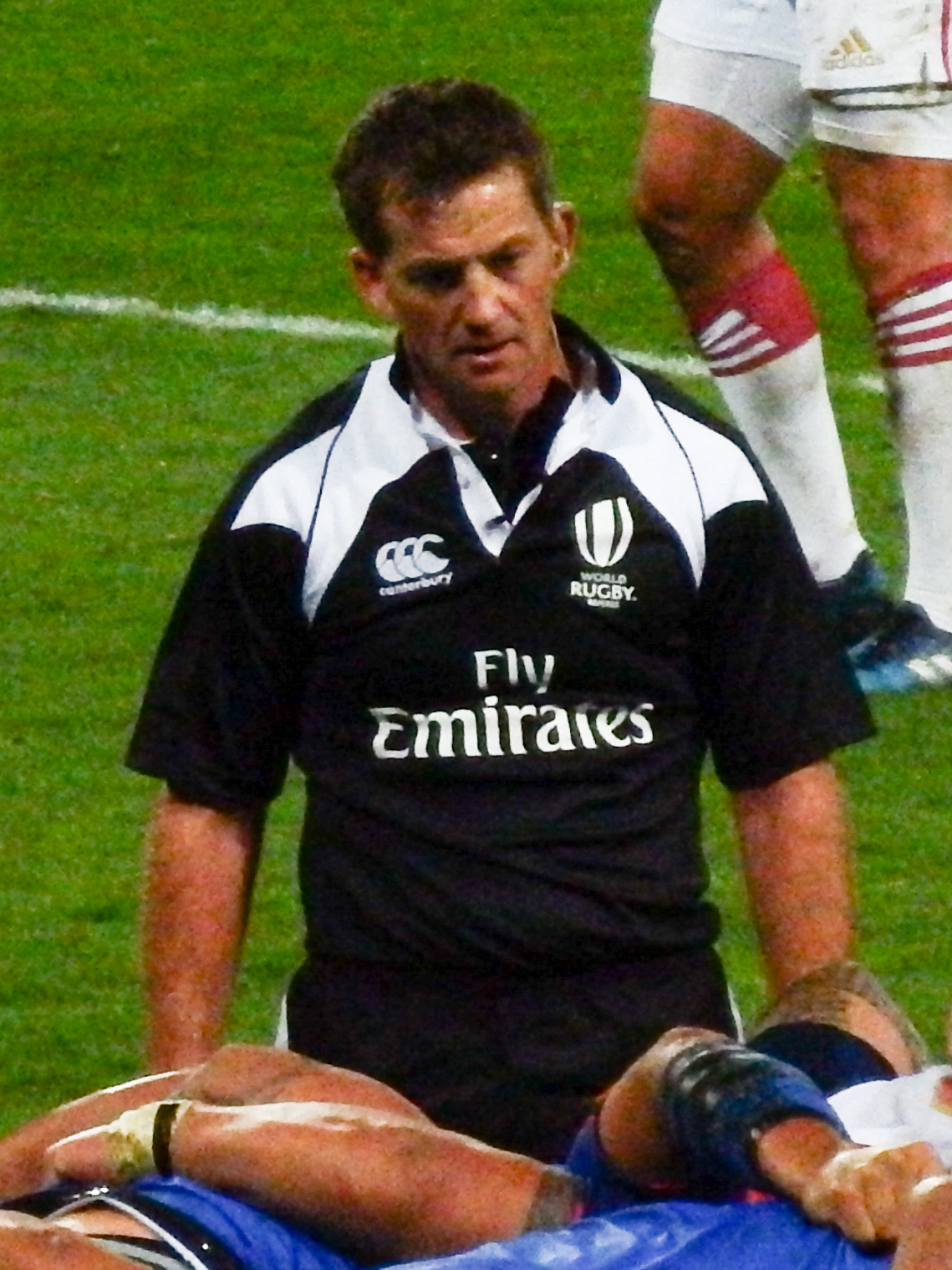
- Doyle in 2019
- Born: John Paul Doyle; 3 August 1979 (age 47) Dublin, Ireland
- School: Terenure College
- University: St Mary's University College, Twickenham
- Occupation: Full time referee

Rugby union career
Refereeing career
Years	Competition	Apps
2006-2020	RFU Premiership	150
2007-Present	European Challenge Cup	13
2010-Present	Heineken Cup	19
2015	Rugby World Cup	1
- Correct as of 20 August 2020

John Paul "JP" Doyle (born 3 August 1979) is an Irish born rugby union referee. Doyle was one of ten full-time rugby union referees employed by the English Rugby Football Union until his redundancy in August 2020. In 2021, he was a referee in Major League Rugby (MLR) in the United States. In 2022, he was named high performance referee coach by Scottish Rugby Union.

== Playing career ==
Doyle was born in Dublin, Ireland, the son of Terry Doyle, later President (2006–7) of the Association of Referees Leinster Branch of the IRFU.

He played scrum-half at school for Terenure College, then Terenure College RFC and St Mary's University College, Twickenham where he trained to be a secondary school teacher. He was forced to stop playing due to an injury and surgery on his back in 2002.

== Refereeing career ==
Doyle started his refereeing career with the Association of Referees Leinster Branch of the IRFU in 2001 and joined the London Society of RFU Referees in January 2003. He was promoted to the South East Group later in 2003 and to the National Panel in 2006. He refereed the final of the Daily Mail Under 18 Schools Cup at Twickenham Stadium in 2007 and the EDF Energy National Trophy Final in 2008.

He was appointed as a trainee full-time official on 1 September 2008. In May 2010, the Elite Referee Unit (ERU) of the RFU confirmed his full-time contract after successfully completing a two-year trainee programme that had seen him referee in the Premiership, the IRB Sevens circuit, the Churchill Cup and Pacific Rim Rugby Championship tournaments.

He officiated at the 2009 IRB Nations Cup, the 2010, 2011 and 2012 IRB Junior World Championship, and the 2010–12 European Nations Cup First Division.

He has regularly refereed matches in the RFU Championship, Premiership and the LV= Cup including important Final matches.

Doyle refereed his first European Challenge Cup match in the 2007–08 season on 18 January 2008 when he officiated at Dax verses Calvisano pool game. His first Heineken Cup game followed in the 2010–11 season on 17 October 2010 (the pool game between Perpignan and Benetton Treviso).

On 27 May 2014, it was announced that Doyle would referee the 2014 Aviva Premiership final, his first as referee.

On 25 September 2015, Doyle refereed the 2015 Rugby World Cup Pool C match between Argentina and Georgia.

Doyle refereed the opening match of the 2016 Six Nations Championship (between France and Italy).
