= John Leahy =

John Leahy is the name of:

Australia

- John Leahy (footballer) (1941–1980), Australian rules footballer
- John Leahy (Australian politician) (1854–1909), Australian Conservative politician, 1893–1909

Ireland

- John Leahy (hurler) (born 1969), former Irish hurler
- John Patrick Kenneth Leahy (1907–1963), Irish Roman Catholic priest
- Johnny Leahy (1890–1949), Irish hurler
- John Leahy (Irish politician), Leader of Renua Ireland

United Kingdom

- John Leahy (diplomat) (1928–2015), former senior British diplomat

United States of America

- John Leahy (executive) (born 1950), American executive at Airbus
- John E. Leahy (1842–1915), American politician
- John Martin Leahy (1886–1967), American short story writer, novelist and artist
