= John Mark Redmond =

Irish cardiothoracic surgeon and businessperson

John Mark Redmond (known as Mark Redmond or J. Mark Redmond) is an Irish cardiothoracic surgeon and businessperson. He is the brother of Professor Paul Redmond.

== Education and training ==
Redmond attended primary and secondary school at St Mary's College, Dublin. He then studied medicine at the Royal College of Surgeons in Ireland, graduating in 1987 with the qualifications LRCP & SI MB BCh NUI. From 1987 to 1988, he undertook his internship at Beaumont Hospital, Dublin. Redmond then trained at Johns Hopkins Hospital, Baltimore, Maryland, United States, where he completed a 5-year general surgery residency (1988-1993) and a 3-year cardiothoracic surgery programme (1993-1996). In 1996, he undertook a fellowship in paediatric cardiothoracic surgery at Children's Hospital of Philadelphia, followed by a fellowship in aortic surgery at Baylor College of Medicine (1997).

== Medical career ==
Redmond served as a member of the Johns Hopkins faculty for three years as Director of Paediatric Heart and Lung Transplant, Co-Director of the Dana and Albert "Cubby" Broccoli Centre for Aortic Diseases, and Director of the Cardiac Research Laboratories. In 1992, Redmond became a Fellow of the Royal College of Surgeons in Ireland (FRCSI).

Redmond returned to Ireland in 2000. He was appointed consultant cardiothoracic surgeon at Mater Misericordiae University Hospital, Our Lady's Children's Hospital, Crumlin, Beacon Hospital and Mater Private Hospital. He also performs surgery for the Belfast Health and Social Care Trust in Northern Ireland.

Redmond is co-founder and co-owner of the Beacon Medical Group, including Beacon Hospital. He has served as Medical Director of Beacon Medical Group and Beacon Hospital.

== Charity work ==
In 2008, Redmond collaborated with Professor Martin Corbally and the cardiac team at Our Lady's Children's Hospital, Crumlin to develop a cardiothoracic surgery training programme at Paediatric Hospital Number 2 in Ho Chi Minh City, Vietnam.

Redmond has also worked with Chernobyl Children International, performing surgery on children who developed heart defects as a result of the Chernobyl disaster.
