= Hubie O'Connor =

Irish rugby union player

- Full name: Hubert Stephen O'Connor
- Born: 2 September 1933 Dublin, Ireland
- Died: 11 February 2011 (aged 77) Dublin, Ireland
- School: Terenure College
- University: Trinity College, Dublin
- Occupation: Obstetrician

Rugby union career
- Position: Flanker
International career
Years	Team	Apps	(Points)
1957	Ireland	4	(0)

Hubie Stephen O'Connor (2 September 1933 — 11 February 2011) was an Irish rugby union international.

== Early life ==
Born in Dublin, O'Connor was one of five siblings and spent his early childhood in Enniscrone, Co Sligo, before returning to Dublin to board at Terenure College. He studied medicine at Trinity College Dublin.

== Career ==
O'Connor played as a flanker for Ireland in all four Tests of the 1957 Five Nations Championship.

An obstetrician and gynaecologist, O'Connor was a senior registrar at St Bartholomew's Hospital in London, where he played rugby for the London Irish club, before setting up practice at Dublin's Mount Carmel Hospital.

== Personal life ==
O'Connor married Frenchwoman Anne Sudreau and was the son-in-law of politician Pierre Sudreau, who served as a minister under Charles de Gaulle.

== See also ==
- List of Ireland national rugby union players
