= Paul Haycock =

Irish rugby union player

- Full name: Paul Philip Haycock
- Born: 19 May 1958 (age 68) Dublin, Ireland

Rugby union career
- Position: Wing
International career
Years	Team	Apps	(Points)
1989	Ireland	1	(0)

Paul Philip Haycock (born 19 May 1958) is an Irish former rugby union international.

Haycock was born in Dublin and attended Terenure College.

A winger, Haycock played for Terenure College RFC and Leinster. He earned an Ireland "B" cap in 1982, before spending several years on the verge of full international honours, featuring in five Irish trials. In 1987, he was an unused member of Ireland's squad for the Rugby World Cup. His solitary Ireland cap came against England at Lansdowne Road in the 1989 Five Nations. He was the first Terenure College player to be capped for Ireland in 17 years.

Haycock runs an office supply business.

== See also ==
- List of Ireland national rugby union players
