= Shane Curran (entrepreneur) =

Irish entrepreneur

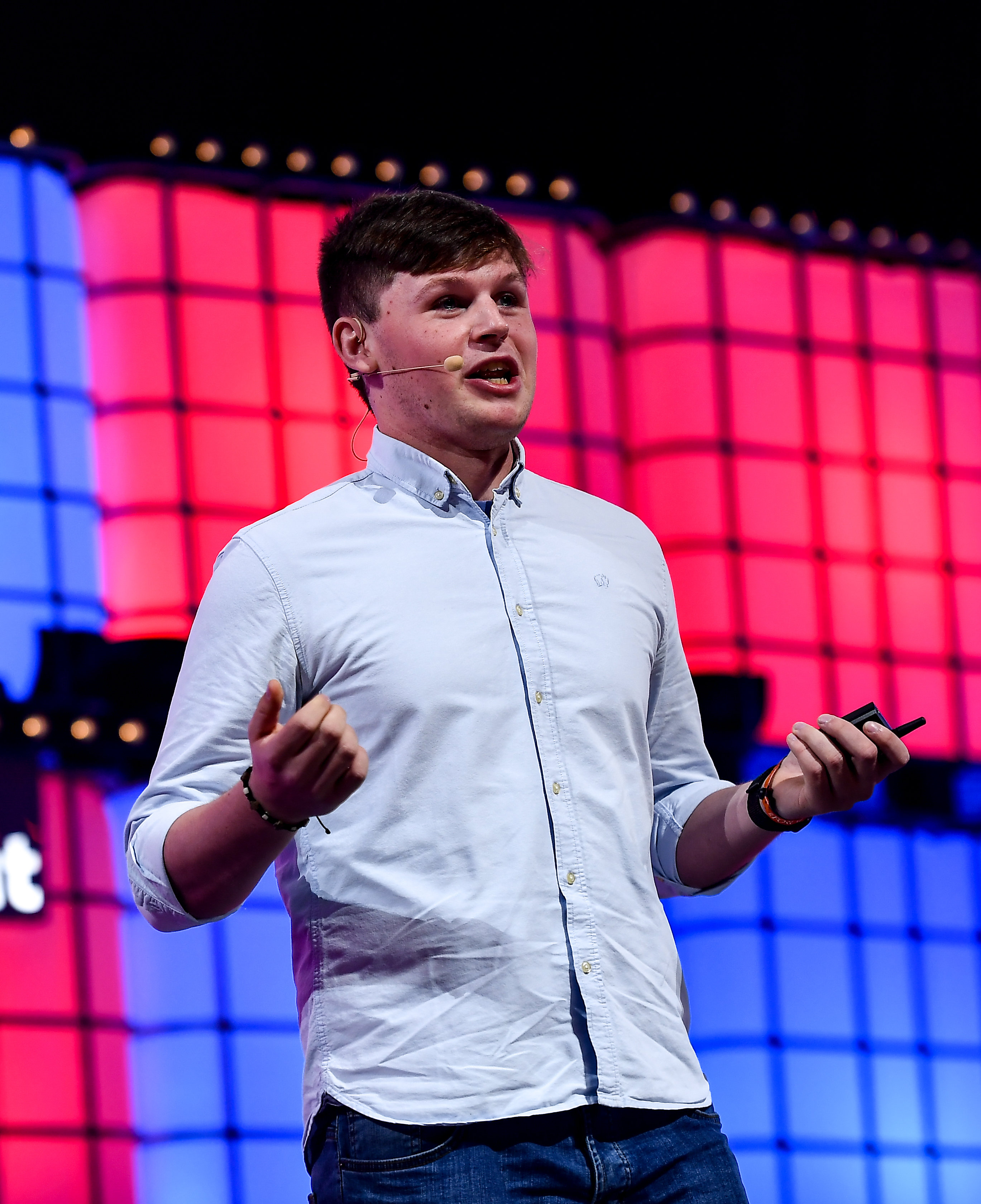
- Curran in 2019
- Born: 1999 or 2000 (age 25–26); Dublin, Ireland
- Education: Terenure College
- Known for: qCrypt; Evervault
- Awards: BT Young Scientist of the Year (2017); Forbes 30 Under 30 (2018)
- Website: https://curran.ie/

Shane Curran (born 2000) is an Irish entrepreneur. He is the founder of Evervault, a technology company based in Dublin. He won the 53rd BT Young Scientist and Technology Exhibition in 2017 at the age of sixteen for his project entitled: "qCrypt: The quantum-secure, encrypted, data storage platform with multi-jurisdictional quorum sharing technology", which provided a platform for long-term, secure data storage. In January 2018, Curran was named in the Forbes 30 Under 30 list.

== Career ==
=== BT Young Scientist ===
Curran entered the 53rd BT Young Scientist and Technology Exhibition with his project entitled "qCrypt: The quantum-secure, encrypted, data storage platform with multijurisdictional quorum sharing technology". The project consisted of advancements in the field of post-quantum cryptography. Curran's research investigated different ways to approach constructing a solution to the issue. On 13 January 2017 he was announced the BT Young Scientist and Technologist of the Year 2017 by Minister for Education and Skills, Mr. Richard Bruton, T.D and Shay Walsh, CEO, BT Ireland. He went on to represent Ireland at the 29th European Union Contest for Young Scientists which took place in Tallinn, Estonia in September 2017.

=== Evervault ===
In 2019, Curran founded Evervault, which builds encryption infrastructure for developers. The company is headquartered in Dublin, Ireland and has received backing from Sequoia Capital and Kleiner Perkins.

Curran founded Evervault in 2018 after briefly beginning a business and law degree at University College Dublin. The Dublin-based company develops privacy tools for software developers. In October 2019, it announced a US$3.2 million seed round led by Sequoia Capital, with participation from Kleiner Perkins, Frontline and SV Angel. As of March 2020 the company had begun hiring; its first product was in testing, and pricing had not yet been finalised. Early descriptions referred to a "privacy cage" model in which encrypted personal data could be processed without exposing raw information to developers. Curran characterised the venture as a long-term project and indicated plans to maintain an Irish base while establishing a San Francisco office.

In late May 2020 Evervault closed a US$16 million Series A led by Index Ventures, with participation from existing investors and Frontline Ventures. Angel investors Dylan Field, Kevin Hartz, and Alex Stamos. As of June 2020 the company employed ten people. Its product remained in beta and was not publicly available. It published a manifesto outlining eight principles for handling private data. Curran stated that its initial target sectors were financial technology and healthcare. The funding brought total equity financing to US$19 million.

At the BT Young Scientist and Technology Exhibition event in January 2021, Curran said Evervault’s mission was to encrypt the web and always keep data encrypted. He described a goal of building an encryption engine for the internet and pointed to processing encrypted data without exposing it as an emerging area.

In 2024, Evervault expanded into payments by launching an independent payments security platform. The company said the platform gives financial technology companies, banks and merchants greater control over their payment stack while addressing compliance and security. It uses the company’s encryption model. It includes tools for securing payment data. It also offers extensions such as network tokens and card insights. Curran said the product unbundles components to reduce dependence on payment processors. The firm presents it as a secure, customisable and independent layer for payments. The stated aim is to provide flexibility for organisations building payment systems.
