= Ciaran Clarke (rugby union) =

Irish rugby union player (born 1969)

- Full name: Ciaran Paul Clarke
- Born: 8 March 1969 (age 57) Dublin, Ireland
- Height: 6 ft 1 in (185 cm)
- Weight: 204 lb (93 kg)

Rugby union career
- Position: Fullback
International career
Years	Team	Apps	(Points)
1993–98	Ireland	5	(3)

Ciaran Paul Clarke (born 8 March 1969) is an Irish former rugby union international.

Clarke, born in Dublin and having attended Terenure College, competed for Terenure College RFC at club level and was a Leinster provincial player.

A fullback, Clarke earned five Test caps for the national team during the 1990s and when first picked had never previously represented Ireland at any level. His Ireland appearances came in the 1993 and 1998 Five Nations Championships. At the 1993 tournament, he kicked a drop goal to help defeat Wales and played in the final day win over England. He announced his retirement from competitive rugby in 1999 as the result of a knee injury.

Clarke is a pharmaceutical representative by profession.

== See also ==
- List of Ireland national rugby union players
