= Beacon Hospital =

- Beacon Medical Group
- Shown in Dublin

Geography
- Location: Dublin, Ireland
- Coordinates: 53.27662°N 6.21954°W

Organisation
- Care system: Private
- Type: General
- Affiliated university: University College Dublin

History
- Founded: 25 October 2006; 19 years ago

Beacon Hospital (Irish: Ospidéal Beacon) is a privately owned full-service teaching hospital located in the Sandyford suburb of Dublin, Ireland. The hospital was developed by Beacon Medical Group (BMG).

== History ==
Beacon Hospital signed an affiliation agreement with Johns Hopkins Medicine International (JHMI), for JHMI to provide educational and consulting services at the hospital, in May 2006. Beacon Hospital was officially opened by then-Tánaiste and Minister for Health and Children, Mary Harney on 25 October 2006. The American Triad Hospitals group took responsibility for the management of the hospital.

In February 2008, University of Pittsburgh Medical Center (UPMC) began managing the hospital, buying a 25% share in the company for €15 million. In 2009, UPMC took majority ownership of the hospital in a €68 million deal which gave it a 68% equity in the company. The hospital was rebranded as UPMC Beacon Hospital.

In April 2014, Beacon Hospital was taken over by Irish businessman Denis O'Brien, with UPMC relinquishing its ownership. UPMC paid €20 million to divest itself of the hospital, relieving itself of a projected $231 million in long-term debt. According to UPMC's 2015 accounts, the company lost €33 million on the disposal of Beacon Hospital and wrote off a further €38.9 million in loans. O'Brien paid Ulster Bank €40 million for the hospital's outstanding €100 million debt.

In March 2021 in the midst of the COVID-19 pandemic, twenty teachers from St Gerard's School, Bray received vaccinations from the hospital. The head of the Irish Health Service and the Minister for Justice expressed 'frustration' at the actions of the Beacon Hospital which violated policies regarding the use of surplus vaccines. The Irish Times noted that the children of the chief executive of the Beacon Hospital attend St. Gerard's.

In 2022, the hospital management presented proposals for a redevelopment which would expand the bed capacity by 40%, the biggest investment since 2014. They had purchased two adjacent sites and the adjoining Beacon Hotel in order to expand clinical facilities, create a new research hub and relocate parts of the existing UCD Beacon Hospital Academy.

In 2024, the hospital was sold to Macquarie Asset Management for an estimated €400m.

== Services ==
Beacon's 9-storey 238,000-square-foot (22,100 m^{2}) facility includes 183 patient beds. The hospital provides teaching for University College Dublin.

Around 1,100 staff work at the hospital.

== Awards ==
Beacon Hospital won the 2008 Irish Healthcare Innovation Award. In 2013, Beacon Hospital won a Commendation at the Irish Healthcare Awards for its DocIT programme. Beacon Hospital also won the 2013 Radiosurgery Excellence Award.

== See also ==
- John Mark Redmond
