= David Duffy =

American professor of botany and zoology

David Cameron Duffy
- Born: September 1, 1953 (age 73)
- Education: Princeton University
- Scientific career
- Fields: Botany, zoology
- Workplaces: University of Hawaiʻi

David Cameron Duffy (born September 1, 1953) is an American professor of botany and zoology at the University of Hawaiʻi, former Director of the Hawaiian Pacific Island Cooperative Ecosystem Studies Unit. He currently holds the Gerritt Parmele Wilder Chair in the School of Life Sciences at the University of Hawaiʻi Manoa.

== Biography ==
Duffy received his Ph.D. from Princeton University in 1980 on the Peruvian upwelling and its seabirds.

After graduating from Princeton, Duffy became a resident scientist in the Galápagos Islands, but was asked to take on the job of interim director of the Charles Darwin Research Station when it faced closing because of a budget deficit and conflict with Ecuadorian authorities. He found funding and restored relations with the Ecuadorians, while finding time to do some research.

Duffy next moved to the University of Cape Town, where he ran the seabird component of the Benguela Ecology Project, again producing research on seabirds and their interactions with fisheries. Concurrently, he and his colleagues began research in the Chilean sector of the Humboldt Current. Duffy began simple models of upwelling trophic relations that were to predate many non-linear models for marine ecosystems.

In 1986, Duffy and his family moved to Costa Rica, where he created the Centro de Documentacion en Vida Silvestre (Biodoc) in Heredia, Costa Rica as part of a United States Fish and Wildlife Service sponsored wildlife management graduate program in which Duffy was one of the first professors.

Two years later, he moved to the University of Georgia, where he became the executive officer of the International Congress of Ecology, under the direction of Frank Golley. At the same time, he began his "landmark" research on the biodiversity of eastern old growth forests and their recovery from clear cutting, which generated controversy among United States Forest Service scientists.

Duffy then moved to Long Island, where he was briefly head of the Seatuck Foundation before becoming principal investigator on a cooperative project on Lyme disease with the Centers for Disease Control and Prevention in Shelter Island. His work focused on the landscape ecology of Lyme disease and the role of deer and seabirds in the transmission of the disease.

Afterward, Duffy moved to Alaska, where he led the Alaska Heritage Program at the University of Alaska Anchorage. His main research there focused on the biodiversity of the Alaskan landscape in relation to protected areas, but he also led the five-year multimillion-dollar APEX (Alaska Predator Ecological Experiment) which monitored the recovery of seabirds following the Exxon Valdez oil spill.

He then moved to directing the Pacific Cooperative Studies, where, as of 2019, he was responsible for supervising 300 employees in approximately 30 cooperative projects with state, federal, and private agencies averaging $14 million a year, focusing on natural and cultural management in Hawaiian and Pacific natural areas and their management. His research ranged from the effects of feral cats and mongoose, especially on island fauna, effects of avian malaria, and ecology and management of seabirds in Hawaii, At the same time, he continued his work on migration of Arctic and Aleutian Terns, seabirds of Rapa Nui (Easter Island) and Galapagos, and on disease and hosts on islands.

== Research and publications ==
Duffy is the author of over 100 scientific publications and the founding editor of the journal Waterbirds. Additionally, he was editor of Colonial Waterbirds from 1997 to 2000. His research has involved how species, ecosystems, and landscapes recover from perturbations, both man-made and natural.

His initial research focused on the birds of the Humboldt upwelling off Peru but expanded to include their relations with their parasites ticks and their prey Anchoveta Engraulis ringens,

He was a featured scientist on National Geographic's "Strange Days on Planet Earth".

In 2019, he was awarded a lifetime achievement award from the Pacific Seabird Group for "major contributions to seabird ecology and science-based efforts to conserve seabirds" and was elected a fellow of the American Ornithological Society. In 2022, he was named a Fellow of the American Association for the Advancement of Science

In 2020, he became editor of Pacific Science, a 75-year-old publication
