= Bank Mendes Gans =

Dutch bank

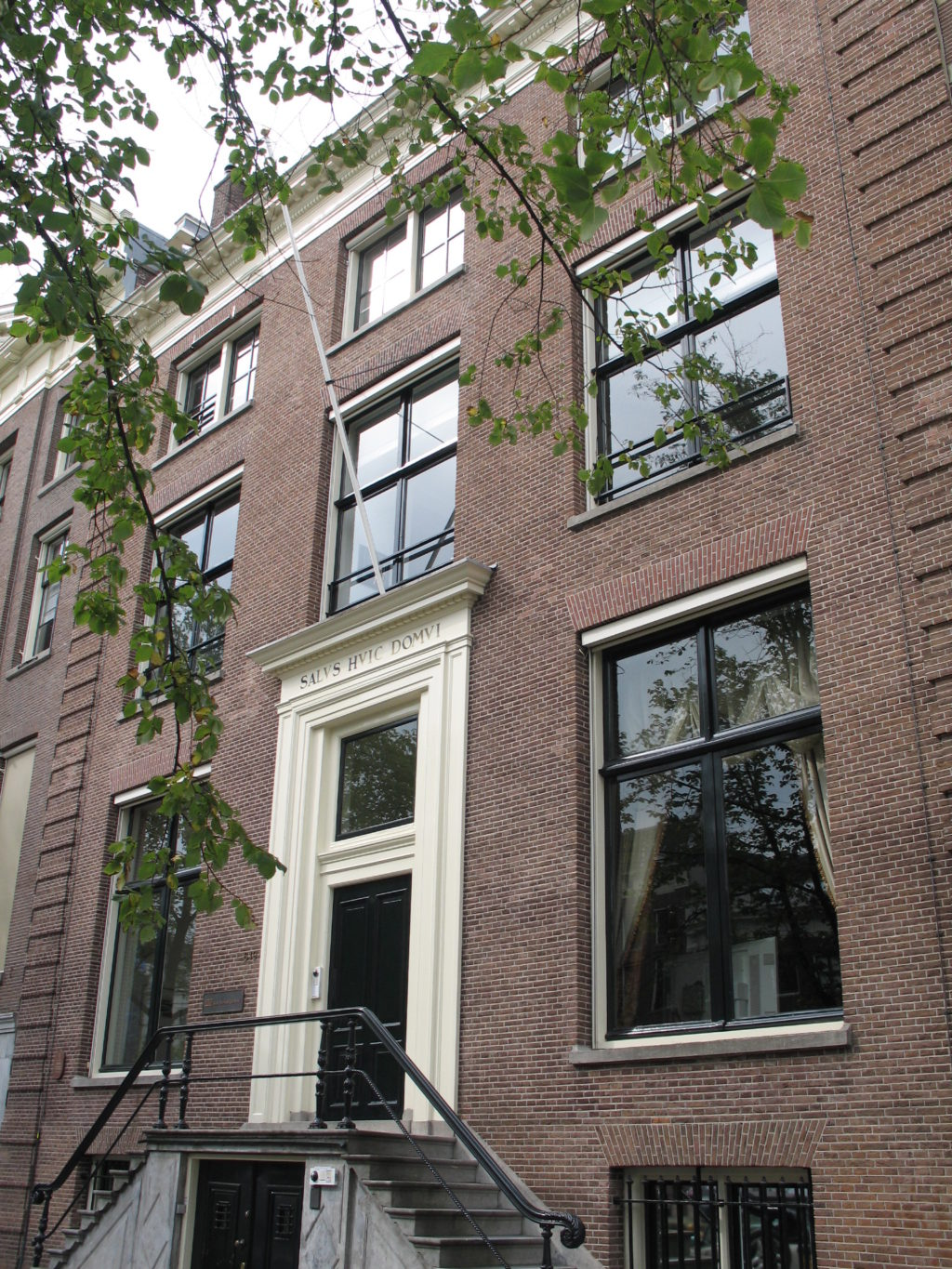
- Bank HQ in Amsterdam
- Type: Subsidiary
- Industry: Financial services, Cash management
- Predecessor: Gans & Co, Mendes Gans & Co.
- Founded: 1883; 143 years ago
- Founder: Julius Gans, Isaak Mendes
- Headquarters: Amsterdam, North Holland, Netherlands
- Key people: Robert Heisterborg (CEO); Paul Koopmans (COO)
- Services: Netting, Cash Pooling, Cash Balancing, Inter-Company Loans, Liquidity Management, Information Management
- Revenue: ▲€76,764,000 (2011)
- Operating income: ▲€46,983,000 (2011)
- Net income: ▲€35,235,000 (2011)
- Total assets: ▲€7,618,938,000 (2011)
- Total equity: ▲€228,330,000 (2011)
- Number of employees: ▲157 (2011)
- Parent: ING Group
- Website: www.mendesgans.com

Bank Mendes Gans (BMG) is a Dutch bank specialising in international cash management services. Founded in 1883 and located in the centre of Amsterdam, the Netherlands, BMG is an independently operated subsidiary of the ING Group (as part of Wholesale Banking).

== Activity ==
BMG's core activity is cash management (cash pooling and netting).

Bank Mendes Gans has about 350 clients, half of them in the USA.

== History ==
At the time the Amsterdam born Julius Gans founded his brokerage firm Gans & Co. in 1883. Six years later, on May 23, 1889, Isaak Mendes (from Jewish Portuguese descent) joined the firm as his partner. Consequently, the name of the brokerage firm changed to Mendes Gans & Co.

In 1911, Mendes Gans & Co. changed into a licensed bank (under supervision of, and licensed by, the Dutch Central Bank "De Nederlandsche Bank"). In those days, the company was mainly involved in managing the investment portfolio of wealthy Dutch individuals.

After World War I, the bank relocated to Herengracht 619, a stately residence built in 1667 by order of Jan Six (1618), former mayor of Amsterdam. The building is designed by architect Adriaan Dortsman. The bank is still located at these premises.

With guidance of the American company and shareholder Dow Chemical, Mendes Gans focused on cash management in the sixties. This, consequently after divesting the brokerage business to ING, led to the further specialization as a cash management bank.

As result of the Nazi occupation of the Netherlands, Isaak Mendes fled during the hectic 'May days' of 1940 to the south of France, where he died in poverty at the age of 70 before the war ended. Partner and co-founder Julius Gans died in 1924 at the age of 65.

== Shareholder ING Bank N.V. ==
ING Bank N.V. gradually purchased 99% of the BMG shares from main shareholders Philips Finance Company, Manufacturers Hanover Trust (currently JP Morgan Chase) and Dow Chemical. In early 2000, the decision was made to de-list Bank Mendes Gans N.V. from the Amsterdam Stock Exchange (AEX-Effectenbeurs/Euronext Amsterdam) on February 1, 2000. By ending the quotation, the Amsterdam Stock Exchange lost one of its oldest listings, as well as one of its most expensive companies by share price (the shares were valued in excess of 20,000 Dutch guilders, equivalent to over 9,000 euros).

== See also ==
- Media related to Herengracht 619, Amsterdam at Wikimedia Commons
