= Eoghan Grace =

Irish rugby union player

- Born: 6 October 1987 (age 39) Clonmel, Ireland
- Height: 1.88 m (6 ft 2 in)
- Weight: 100 kg (16 st; 220 lb)
- School: Rockwell College

Rugby union career
- Position: Flanker
Amateur team(s)
Years	Team	Apps	(Points)
–	Shannon		

Eoghan Grace (born 6 October 1987) is an Irish former rugby union player.

== Career ==
Grace began his professional rugby career as a member of his native province Munster's academy, However, Grace was unable to break into Munster's senior squad, and he moved to England to join Premiership Rugby side Exeter Chiefs ahead of the 2010–11 season. Grace didn’t manage to play a full game at the Devon club, he was hampered by constant injury Grace's and after one season with Exeter chiefs he was released.

After rugby, Grace began running two companies; Eolas+, a not-for-profit that goes into primary schools and runs holiday camps in the south-west of England to get children involved in sports, and Pro Rugby Academy, which works with aspiring rugby players who have missed out on contracts with professional clubs. The companies have now dissolved
