= Mike Hipwell =

Ireland international rugby union player

Michael Louis "Mick" Hipwell (born 15 July 1940) is a former Ireland international rugby union player. He toured New Zealand in 1971 with the British Lions and at the time played club rugby for Terenure College RFC. He was born in Bagenalstown, County Carlow, Ireland

== Rugby career ==
Hipwell played club rugby for Terenure College RFC and provincial rugby for Leinster Rugby. He made his full debut for the Ireland national rugby union team in 1962 playing against the England national rugby union team at Twickenham Stadium. He played for Ireland for ten years with his final international cap coming against the France national rugby union team at Lansdowne Road. He was used as the first official replacement used by Ireland in international rugby in 1969 after substitutions were permitted by the International Rugby Football Board. Hipwell was also selected to play for the British Lions on their 1971 tour to New Zealand. However Hipwell injured his knee in the tour as well as received facial damage in a match against the Canterbury Rugby Football Union and was replaced on the Lions tour by Rodger Arneil. It was suspected that the action to injure was predetermined by the Canterbury coaches so to damage the British Lions before they played the All Blacks as two Lions props were also injured in the match.

== Personal life ==
Hipwell has a brother called Dave, who played for the Zambia national rugby union team and later moved to Rhodesia to serve in the British South Africa Police.
