= Terenure College RFC =

Irish rugby union club based in Dublin

(Republic of Ireland) Terenure College
- Full name: Terenure College Rugby Football Club
- Union: (Ireland) IRFU
- Branch: Leinster
- Founded: 5 November 1940; 85 years ago
- Location: Terenure, Dublin, Ireland
- Region: South Dublin
- Ground(s): 'Lakelands', Terenure, Dublin (Capacity: 3,000)
- Chairman: Maurice Downing
- President: John Cadell
- Coach: Paul Barr
- Captain: Adam Tuite
- League: All-Ireland League, 1A
- 2024–25: 6th.
Team kit

Official website
- tcrfc.ie

Terenure College RFC is an amateur rugby union club based in the Terenure suburb of Dublin, Ireland. The institution, founded on 5 November 1940, plays in Division 1A of the All-Ireland League.

== History ==
Terenure College RFC was founded on 5 November 1940. With a great love for the game and concerned that past pupils were not playing rugby union after leaving school, Rev. Fr Jackie Corbett, O.Carm., chaired a meeting of rugby playing past pupils of Terenure College in the Hotel Lenehan, Harcourt Street, Dublin.

Terenure played their first match shortly afterwards against the Terenure College SCT at the time. The club won 8 points to 3. It took until 8 January 1959 for Terenure to be promoted to a Senior club after fourteen applications to the Leinster Branch, that after winning five Junior 1 titles and many other trophies. Two years later Mick Hipwell was selected to play for Ireland, Terenure's first Irish international. Mick played against England at Twickenham.

The years 1965-7 were successful seasons for Terenure under the captaincy of Eddie Coleman (later to be IRFU president) and Eddie Thornton respectively, as they won the Leinster Senior league twice in a row. Terenure College RFC has had a number of players represent Ireland. These include Mick Hipwell, Brendan Sherry, Paul Haycock, Ciaran Clarke, Niall Hogan, David Corkery, Girvan Dempsey, and Eric Miller. Terenure has also supplied personnel to the Irish team at other levels including a number of "baggage masters".

== Present day ==
Leinster have benefited from the Terenure College 'rugby factory' with former players such as Girvan Dempsey, David Blaney, Niall Hogan, Mark Egan, James Blaney, David McAllister and Brian Blaney playing for the province.

Terenure College field the most adult teams in the province of Leinster, with six adult teams fielded each week. In addition, more than 600 boys and girls play mini-rugby every Sunday morning. They were recognised as the "best senior club in Ireland" at the Energia All-Ireland League Awards 2023.

Terenure College has provided two presidents of the IRFU - M. H. Carroll (1984–85) and E. Coleman (2000–01) and two president of the Leinster Branch - D. Lamont (2009–2010)

Terenure College RFC play in the top division of the All Ireland League, having been promoted in 2014 from Division 1B on the back of promotion the previous season from Division 2A. They finished as runner up in 2021–22, losing to Clontarf in the final. In 2022–23 the club again met Clontarf in the final, winning the match to claim their maiden All Ireland League title.

== Honours ==
- Leinster Senior League (6): 1983-84, 1995–96, 1998–99, 2000–01, 2019-20, 2022-23
- Leinster Senior Cup (8): 1965-66, 1966–67, 1993–94, 1995–96, 2000-01, 2021-22, 2022-23, 2025-26
- Metropolitan Cup (10): 1949, 1950, 1960, 1979, 1988, 1997, 1999, 2015, 2018, 2022
- All Ireland League
  - Division 1A (1): 2023
  - Division 1B (1): 2014
  - Division 2A (2): 2006, 2013
- All-Ireland Cup (2): 2022-23, 2023-24

== Notable players ==
=== Internationals ===
Ireland

- Mick Hipwell
- Brendan Sherry
- Paul Haycock
- Ciaran Clarke
- Niall Hogan
- David Corkery
- Girvan Dempsey
- Isaac Boss
- John Cooney

Barbarians

- Mick Hipwell
- Girvan Dempsey
- Eric Miller

British and Irish Lions

- Mick Hipwell
- Eric Miller

Ireland Under 20s

- Ben Blaney

=== Other ===
- Mark Egan
