= Alberto Chillon =

Italian rugby union player

- Full name: Alberto Chillon
- Born: 5 December 1990 (age 35) Venice, Italy
- Height: 1.76 m (5 ft 9 in)
- Weight: 80 kg (12 st 8 lb; 176 lb)

Rugby union career
- Position: scrum-half
- Current team: Petrarca Padova
Senior career
Years	Team	Apps	(Points)
2009–2012	Petrarca	33	(37)
2012	→Treviso	6	(0)
2012–2015	Zebre	51	(28)
2015−2019	Rovigo Delta	77	(160)
2019–2020	Petrarca	11	(17)
2020–2021	Valorugby Emilia	20	(10)
2021–2025	Rovigo Delta		
2025–2026	Petrarca Padova		
2026–	Rangers Vicenza		
- Correct as of 28 March 2015
International career
Years	Team	Apps	(Points)
2009–10	Italy U20	13	(70)
2012	Italy A	3	(24)
2013	Italy	1	(0)
- Correct as of 24 June 2013

Alberto Chillon (born 5 December 1990) is an Italian rugby union player who plays as a scrum-half. He currently plays for Rangers_Vicenza_Rugby after the experiences with Petrarca Padova, Valorugby Emilia and Rovigo Delta in the Top10.

In 2021 Chillon was named as Permit Player for Benetton Treviso. From 2012 to 2015, he played for Zebre. From 2023 to 2025 he played for Rovigo Delta, then for Petrarca Padova and now for Rangers_Vicenza_Rugby.

In May 2013, Chillon was called up by the Italian national rugby union team for the South African Quadrangular Tournament. On 22 June, he made his debut against Scotland coming on as a substitute.
