= Gabriele Morelli (rugby union) =

Italian rugby union player

- Born: 29 June 1988 (age 38) Montichiari, Italy
- Height: 1.89 m (6 ft 2 in)
- Weight: 130 kg (287 lb; 20 st 7 lb)

Rugby union career
- Position: Hooker
- Current team: Calvisano
Youth career
- 1999−2007: Calvisano
- 2007: F.I.R. Academy
Senior career
Years	Team	Apps	(Points)
2007−2022	Calvisano	191	(45)
2016	→Zebre	1	(0)
- Correct as of 31 May 2020
International career
Years	Team	Apps	(Points)
2008	Italy Under 20	4	(0)
2012	Emerging Italy	2	(5)
- Correct as of 7 June 2020

Gabriele Morelli (Montichiari, 29 June 1988) is a retired Italian rugby union player. His usual position was a Hooker and he played for Calvisano in Top12.

For 2015–16 Pro12 season, Morelli was an Additional Player for Zebre.

In 2008, he was also named in the Italy Under 20 and in 2012 in the Emerging Italy squad.
