= Romain Martial =

French rugby union player

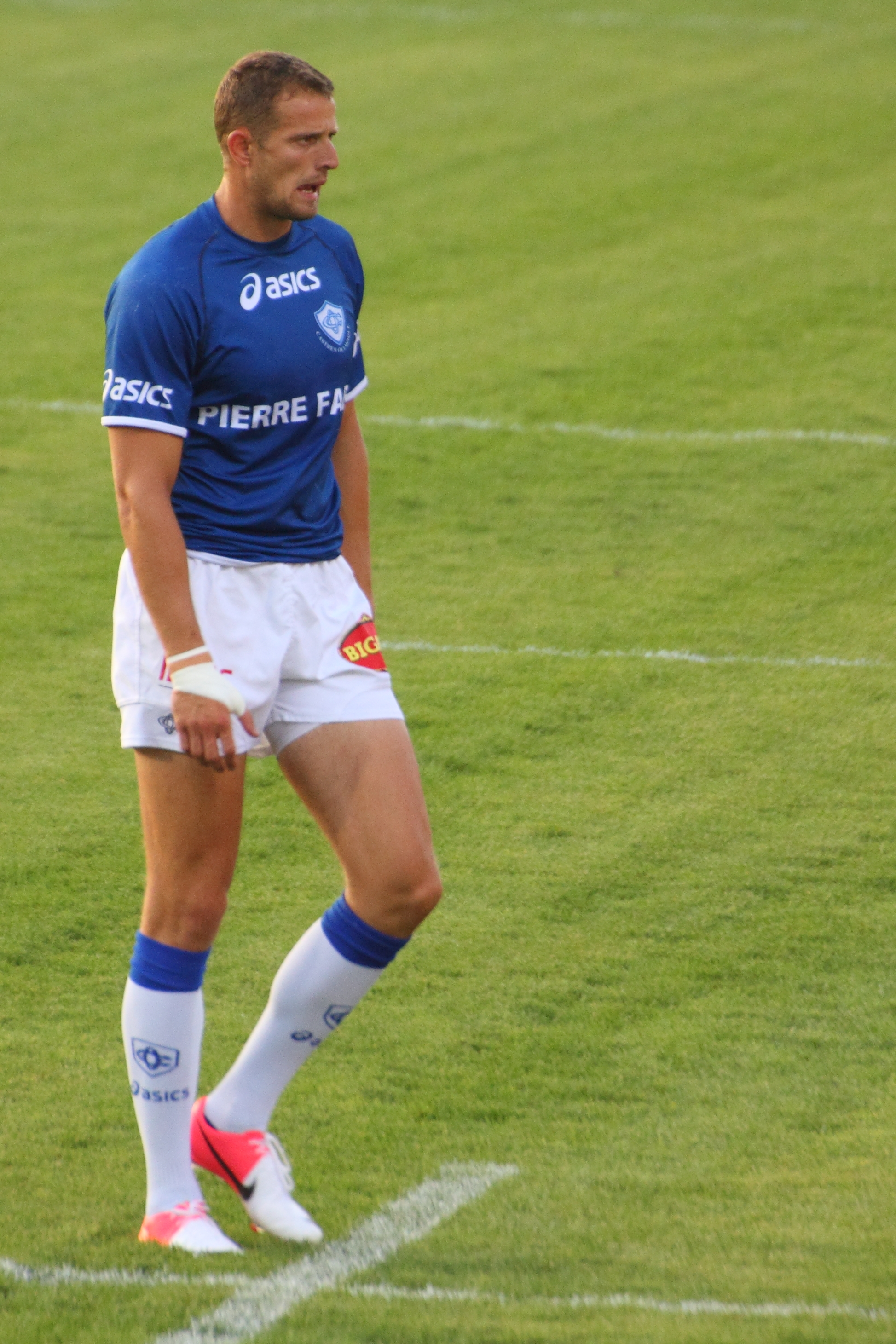
- Born: 13 November 1984 (age 42) Clermont-Ferrand, France
- Height: 1.95 m (6 ft 5 in)
- Weight: 102 kg (16 st 1 lb)

Rugby union career
- Position: Wing
Senior career
Years	Team	Apps	(Points)
2007–2010	RC Narbonne	60	(115)
2010–16	Castres Olympique	88	(135)
2016-17	Aviron Bayonnais	19	(28)
2017-18	Stade Français Paris	12	(10)
2019-	U.S.Issoireenne Rugby	5	(0)
- Correct as of 7 December 2019

Romain Martial (born 13 November 1984) is a French rugby union player for Issoire in the Top 14. He plays on the wing. He began his career with RC Narbonne in the Pro D2, scoring 115 points in three seasons, before moving to Castres. He was the joint second top try scorer in the 2011–12 season, with 10 tries.

== Honours ==
=== Club ===
(France) Castres

- Top 14: 2012–13
