= John Patrick Kenneth Leahy =

Irish priest (1907–1963)

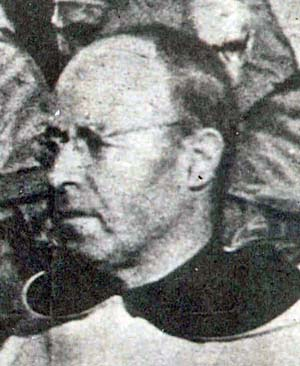
- Born: 7 March 1907; Kinsale, County Cork, Ireland
- Died: 21 June 1963 (aged 56); Tucson, Arizona, US
- Education: Pontifical Gregorian University, Rome
- Occupation: Roman Catholic priest

The Very Reverend John Patrick Kenneth Leahy, O.Carm. D.Ph. S.T.M. (7 March 1907 – 23 June 1963) was a Roman Catholic priest, Prior of the Carmelite College of Pius XI, Assistant General and Procurator General of the Carmelite Order, and a Professor of Moral Theology in Rome.

== Biography ==
Father Leahy was born in Kinsale, County Cork, Ireland, the son of William Leahy, a merchant tailor, and Mary Leahy. He was one of five children, and attended the local Presentation Brothers primary school.

He lived only a short walk from the Carmelite Church and Friary. His proximity to the Carmelite community profoundly influenced his future, and he left Kinsale to enroll in the Carmelite-run Terenure College in Dublin. He entered the Carmelite Novitiate in 1923, and was professed in 1924. As an obviously outstanding student, he was sent to Rome in 1924 to pursue a course in philosophical and theological studies, earning a Sacrae Theologiae Magister at the Pontifical Gregorian University and a doctorate in philosophy at the Pontifical Academy of St. Thomas Aquinas.

Leahy was ordained to the priesthood on 24 June 1930. His first academic appointment was to the Professorship of Moral Theology at the International College of Saint Albert, a house of studies for Carmelite students in Rome. He remained there until 1939, when he was appointed Prior of the Carmelite College of Pius XI. During the challenging war years, he worked to protect the interests of Irish and American residents in Rome. From October, 1943, Pope Pius XII asked churches, convents and other Catholic institutions throughout Italy to shelter Jews from persecution. Leahy responded, at personal risk to himself, by hiding the Jewish owner of a nearby and well-known restaurant, Scoglio di Frisio. Father Leahy's action was acknowledged for decades after the war, and all Carmelites who ate there received an immediate discount.

After the Second World War, Leahy was appointed Professor of Moral Theology at the Collegio Urbano of Propaganda Fide and at the Pontificio Collegio Beda. These offices he held until he was appointed to the position of Assistant General of the Carmelite Order in the General Chapter of 1947. He was Assistant General for six years before he was appointed to the second highest post in the Carmelite Order that of Procurator General in 1953. In 1959, he acted as a censor deputatus for the Censor Librorum. In 1959, he relinquished the office of Procurator General, and moved to Tucson, Arizona, because of ill health. During his time in Tucson, he was a consultant on the bishop's tribunals, and active at the Sacred Heart Parish Church. He died on 21 June 1963 at the age of 56, and was buried in Holy Hope Cemetery in Tucson.

== Works ==
Father Leahy wrote two books on Mother Marie Joseph Butler (1860-1940) under the pseudonym, Carmelite Pilgrim:

- Leahy, J.K. (Kenneth) I knew a valiant woman: Mother Butler of Marymount (Tarrytown, NY: Marymount, 1949)
- Leahy, J. Kenneth As the eagle: the spiritual writings of Mother Butler R.S.H.M., Foundress of Marymount (New York: P.J.Kenedy, 1954)
