= Dorin Manole =

Romania international rugby union player

- Full name: Dorin Gigi Manole
- Born: 5 August 1986 (age 40) Podoleni, Romania
- Height: 1.82 m (5 ft 11 1/2 in)
- Weight: 94 kg (14 st 11 lb; 207 lb)
- Notable relative(s): Parent : Nuțu Manole; Wife: Adelina Manole; Kids: Nectaria Manole; Maria Manole; Ana Manole

Rugby union career
- Position(s): Fly-half, wing, fullback
- Current team: CSM Baia Mare
Youth career
- 2000–05: Tecuci, Focșani
Senior career
Years	Team	Apps	(Points)
2005–09	Universitatea Cluj	?	(?)
2007	Slava Moscow	?	(?)
2009–11	CRC Madrid	?	(?)
2011–2018	U.S. Orthez	?	(?)
2019–2023	CSM Baia Mare	21	(148)
- Correct as of 30 December 2019
International career
Years	Team	Apps	(Points)
2009–2023	Romania	27	(35)
- Correct as of 30 December 2019

Dorin Gigi Manole (born 5 August 1986) was a Romanian rugby union player. He plays as a fly-half for professional SuperLiga club CSM Baia Mare. He can also play as a wing or fullback.

== Club career ==
Dorin Manole started playing rugby as a youth for a local Romanian club based in Tecuci and then started his professional journey joining the youth ranks of a local team in Focșani, under the guidance of coaches Genu Popa and Vasile Condurache. Between 2005 and 2009 he played for SuperLiga club Universitatea Cluj. In 2007, he was signed for a brief period by Russian club Slava Moscow. After playing in Romania for the past 5 years, followed a move to Spanish club CRC Madrid and after almost three years with the Spaniards he signed with Fédérale 2 club U.S. Orthez in France. A return to Romanian rugby followed and in early 2019 he was signed by SuperLiga side, CSM Baia Mare.

== International career ==
Manole is also selected for Romania's national team, the Oaks, making his international debut at the 2008–10 European Nations Cup First Division in a match against the Schwarze Adler.
