= Brendan Sherry =

Irish rugby union player

- Full name: Brendan Francis Sherry
- Born: 7 June 1943 (age 83) Cork, Ireland

Rugby union career
- Position: Scrum-half
International career
Years	Team	Apps	(Points)
1967–68	Ireland	6	(0)

Brendan Francis Sherry (born 7 June 1943) is an Irish former rugby union international.

Born in Cork, Sherry was a scrum-half with Terenure College RFC, capped six times by Ireland, debuting against Australia at Lansdowne Road in 1967. After appearing in Ireland's first two 1967 Five Nations matches, he was dropped for Roger Young, but regained his place for that year's tour of Australia, where he performed well in the win over the Wallabies in the one-off Test at the Sydney Cricket Ground. He was capped a further two times in the 1968 Five Nations.

== See also ==
- List of Ireland national rugby union players
