= Tonderai Chavhanga =

South African rugby union player

- Born: 24 December 1983 (age 42) Harare, Zimbabwe
- Height: 1.84 m (6 ft 1/2 in)
- Weight: 86 kg (13 st 8 lb; 190 lb)
- School: Prince Edward School, Harare
- University: University of the Free State

Rugby union career
- Position: Wing
Youth career
- 2002–2003: Free State Cheetahs
Senior career
Years	Team	Apps	(Points)
2003–2004	Free State Cheetahs	3	(5)
2004–2009	Stormers	37	(70)
2005–2009	Western Province	40	(80)
2010–2011	Lions	11	(10)
2010–2011	Golden Lions	8	(5)
2011–2013	Newport Gwent Dragons	28	(50)
2013	Free State Cheetahs	0	(0)
2014–2015	Sharks (Currie Cup)	16	(20)
2014–2015	Sharks	5	(5)
- Correct as of 8 May 2015
International career
Years	Team	Apps	(Points)
2003	South Africa Under-21	3	(10)
2003	South Africa Sevens		
2005–2008	South Africa	4	(30)
2007	Emerging Springboks	2	(10)
- Correct as of 25 March 2015

Tonderai Chavhanga (born 24 December 1983) is a South African rugby union player. Chavhanga has played for the national team, the Springboks, having been capped four times.

== Childhood ==
Chavhanga was born in Harare, Zimbabwe. He was raised by his mother, who had a strong influence on his religious views. His mother worked in construction and built the house in which he grew up. Although poor his mother supported him financially and was the biggest influence on him. His father played very little role in his life, as he remarried and was uninvolved in his up bringing.

Chavhanga played rugby for the first time in Grade 5, at Harare's government-owned Blakiston Primary School. Even at a young age, Tonderai's speed qualities were evident as he was much quicker than his peers. He made first team rugby for three consecutive years at primary school and made the Harare Schools Representative team for three straight years playing fullback. Chavhanga attended Prince Edward School in Zimbabwe on a scholarship. He was the youngest player in the history of the school to play for the school's first team.

== Career ==
Chavhanga played for the Stormers in the international Super Rugby competition. He left Cape Town in 2010 after he signed a two-year contract with the Lions in September 2009.

Chavhanga made his international debut for the Springboks as a 21-year-old on 11 June 2005 on the right wing, in a home game against Uruguay at the Basil Kenyon Stadium in East London. The Springboks notched up a large victory, winning 134–3. Chavhanga scored six tries in the match and now holds the South African record for the most number of tries scored in one game. He missed the end of year touring matches, because of a quad muscle injury.

He was selected as part of the Springboks squad to tour New Zealand and Australia. He was on the bench for the game against the All Blacks in Christchurch. He could run the 100 meters in 10.27 seconds, possibly making him the fastest rugby player in South African history.

Chavhanga joined Welsh regional side Newport Gwent Dragons in September 2011, but was released at the end of the 2012–2013 season.

He returned to South Africa and was included in the Free State Cheetahs squad for the 2013 Currie Cup Premier Division season.

=== Test history ===
No.	Opponents	Results (SA 1st)	Position	Tries	Dates	Venue
1.	Uruguay	134–3	Wing	6	11 June 2005	Basil Kenyon Stadium, East London
2.	New Zealand	6–33	Replacement		14 July 2007	AMI Stadium, Christchurch
3.	Wales	43–17	Wing		7 June 2008	Free State Stadium, Bloemfontein
4.	Wales	37–21	Wing		14 June 2008	Loftus Versfeld, Pretoria

== Xenophobia ==
He made a strong statement against xenophobia when he addressed media, in his capacity as a Springbok on the 2008 xenophobic attacks. He also clearly stated that he was a Shona, a Zimbabwean ethnic tribe.

== See also ==
- List of South Africa national rugby union players – Springbok no. 768
