= Juan Ignacio Gauthier =

Argentine rugby union footballer

Juan Gauthier
- Born: Juan Ignacio Gauthier; March 3, 1982 (age 44) Buenos Aires, Argentina
- Height: 5 ft 10 in (1.78 m)
- Weight: 78 kg 171 lb

Rugby union career
- Position: Utility Back
Senior career
Years	Team	Apps	(Points)
- Rome
International career
Years	Team	Apps	(Points)
2008	Argentina	2	(15)

Juan Ignacio Gauthier (born March 3, 1982, in Buenos Aires) is an Argentine rugby union footballer who plays at fullback.

He had 2 caps for Argentina national rugby union team, in 2008, and scored 3 tries, 15 points on aggregate. He played for Hindú Club and currently plays for Rome.

== See also ==
- Argentina national rugby union team
