= Tomás de Vedia =

Argentine rugby union player (born 1982)

- Born: 31 May 1982 (age 44)
- Height: 6 ft 2 in (1.88 m)
- Weight: 14 st 8 lb (93 kg)

Rugby union career
- Position: Centre
Amateur team(s)
Years	Team	Apps	(Points)
- San Isidro Club
Senior career
Years	Team	Apps	(Points)
2003-2006	Saracens		
2006-present	London Irish	3	(10)
- Correct as of 7 April 2008
International career
Years	Team	Apps	(Points)
2007-2008	Argentina	3	(0)
National sevens team
Years	Team		Comps
- Argentina

Tomás de Vedia (born May 31, 1982) is an Argentine rugby union player. He plays as a centre.

He is the son of rugby player back row Ricardo "Tacho" de Vedia. He played at the San Isidro Club in Buenos Aires, debuting in the top league of Argentine rugby in 2003. In 2006 he moved to Saracens in England, and in 2007 moved again to London Irish, where he played alongside fellow Argentines Gonzalo Tiesi and Juan Manuel Leguizamón. He debuted for the Argentine national team in June 2007 as a forward against Ireland but was not selected for the 2007 World Cup. He had 3 caps, without scoring, until 2008. He also played for Argentina Jaguars.

After being released by London Irish, he has since moved back to Argentina to play for SIC.
