= Pedro Leal (rugby union) =

Portuguese rugby union player

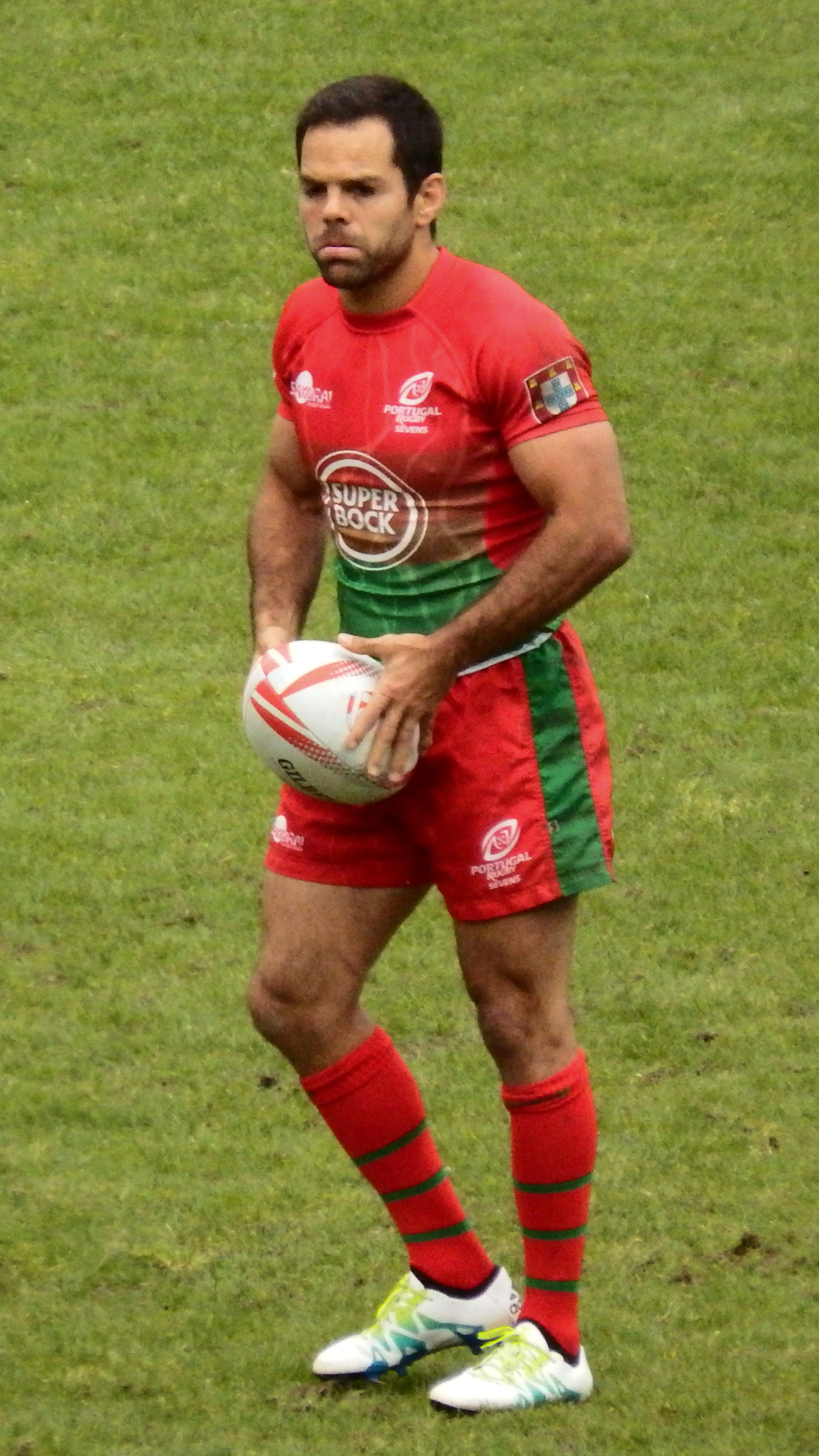
- Born: 28 April 1984 (age 42) Lisbon, Portugal
- Height: 1.70 m (5 ft 7 in)
- Weight: 75 kg (165 lb)

Rugby union career
- Position: Scrum-half / Fullback / Fly-Half
Senior career
Years	Team	Apps	(Points)
- Direito
- Brive
2011–2012	Nice	10	(111)
2013–2014	Lusitanos XV	2	(3)
- Correct as of 11 February 2014
International career
Years	Team	Apps	(Points)
2005–2017	Portugal	76	(265)
- Correct as of 16 March 2019
National sevens team
Years	Team		Comps
2005–2016	Portugal		338

Pedro Miguel da Cunha Leal (born 28 April 1984, in Lisbon) is a Portuguese international rugby player and a regular on the World Rugby Sevens World Series circuit. He plays as a fullback or a scrum-half.

He is widely considered Portugal's best player in rugby sevens, and in the 2006/07 IRB Sevens World Series he scored 20 tries from eight tournament appearances. He was the top scorer at the 2008 Hannover Sevens event, with 74 points. Leal is one of only nine players to have scored more than 1,000 points in the World Rugby Sevens World Series.

Leal has 76 full caps for Portugal. He played three games at the 2007 Rugby World Cup.
