= Alberto Chiesa =

Italian rugby player

- Born: 25 February 1988 (age 38) Livorno, Italy
- Height: 177 cm (5 ft 10 in)
- Weight: 89 kg (196 lb; 14 st 0 lb)

Rugby union career
- Position: Fullback
- Current team: Cavalieri Prato
Senior career
Years	Team	Apps	(Points)
2008−09	Capitolina	10	(5)
2009−12	Cavalieri Prato	62	(41)
2012−13	Zebre	13	(2)
2013−20	Calvisano	138	(73)
2020−	Cavalieri Prato		
International career
Years	Team	Apps	(Points)
2008	Italy Under 20	5	(0)
2009−2015	Emerging Italy	10	(15)
Coaching career
- Years: Team
- 2020–: Cavalieri Prato (assistant coach)

Alberto Chiesa (born 25 February 1988) is an Italian rugby player. He represents Cavalieri Prato, with double role of player and coach, after the experience with Rugby Calvisano, an Italian rugby union club in rugby union club matches.

In 2012–2013 season he played for Zebre.
