= Beacon Medical Group =

Beacon Medical Group (also known as BMG) is a private healthcare company based in Sandyford, Dublin, Ireland. BMG was founded in 2002 by cardiothoracic surgeon Professor Mark Redmond, Michael Cullen, and John Delaney.

== Beacon Medical Campus ==
BMG developed the Beacon Medical Campus, which includes:

- Beacon CARE Facility
- Beacon Consultants Clinic
- Beacon Hospital
- Beacon Pain Clinic
- Beacon Pharmacy
- Beacon Renal (established in 2004, three renal dialysis clinics in Drogheda, Tallaght and Sandyford)
- Beacon Homecare
- Beacon Face and Dermatology
- Irish Maternal Fetal Foundation
- UCD Beacon Academy
- Weight Motivation Clinics
- Wellington Eye Clinic

== History ==
BMG was formed 2002 as a co-location venture between public and private hospitals. The Group won public tenders to build co-located private hospitals on the grounds of Beaumont Hospital in Dublin, Cork University Hospital, and University Hospital Limerick. The Limerick facility was to be built by Sisk Group, while the Cork and Dublin hospitals were to be built by Ascon-Rohcon. BMG were to be owners and developers, while UPMC would manage and operate the hospitals. The co-location projects were expected to cost over €850m, providing approximately 1,000 new beds. The new hospitals would provide almost 6,000 full-time, permanent jobs and a further 4,600 construction jobs.

BMG and Landmark Developments announced in 2008 plans to develop a 127-160 bed private combined maternity and children's hospital beside Beacon Hospital at a cost of approximately €160 million. The hospital was planned to provide paediatric, obstetric, and gynaecology services, delivering 3,000-5,000 babies per year. The Group expected to agree a service-level agreement with the Health Service Executive to allow access to the hospital by public patients. Planning permission was granted in 2010. BMG expected the hospital to employ 450 people directly, with a further 650 ancillary hospital jobs, and 550 construction jobs. Development of the hospital was halted by a blanket ban on development in the area, which was imposed by Dún Laoghaire–Rathdown County Council.

Co-location projects were stalled by Vhi Healthcare's refusal to provide cover in the new hospitals. In April 2011, the contracts for the projects expired.

Beacon campus has more than 30 active research projects. From 2015 to 2022 more than 2'100 medical students have received training at the UCD Beacon Academy.
