= Andrea Bacchetti (rugby union) =

Italy international rugby union player

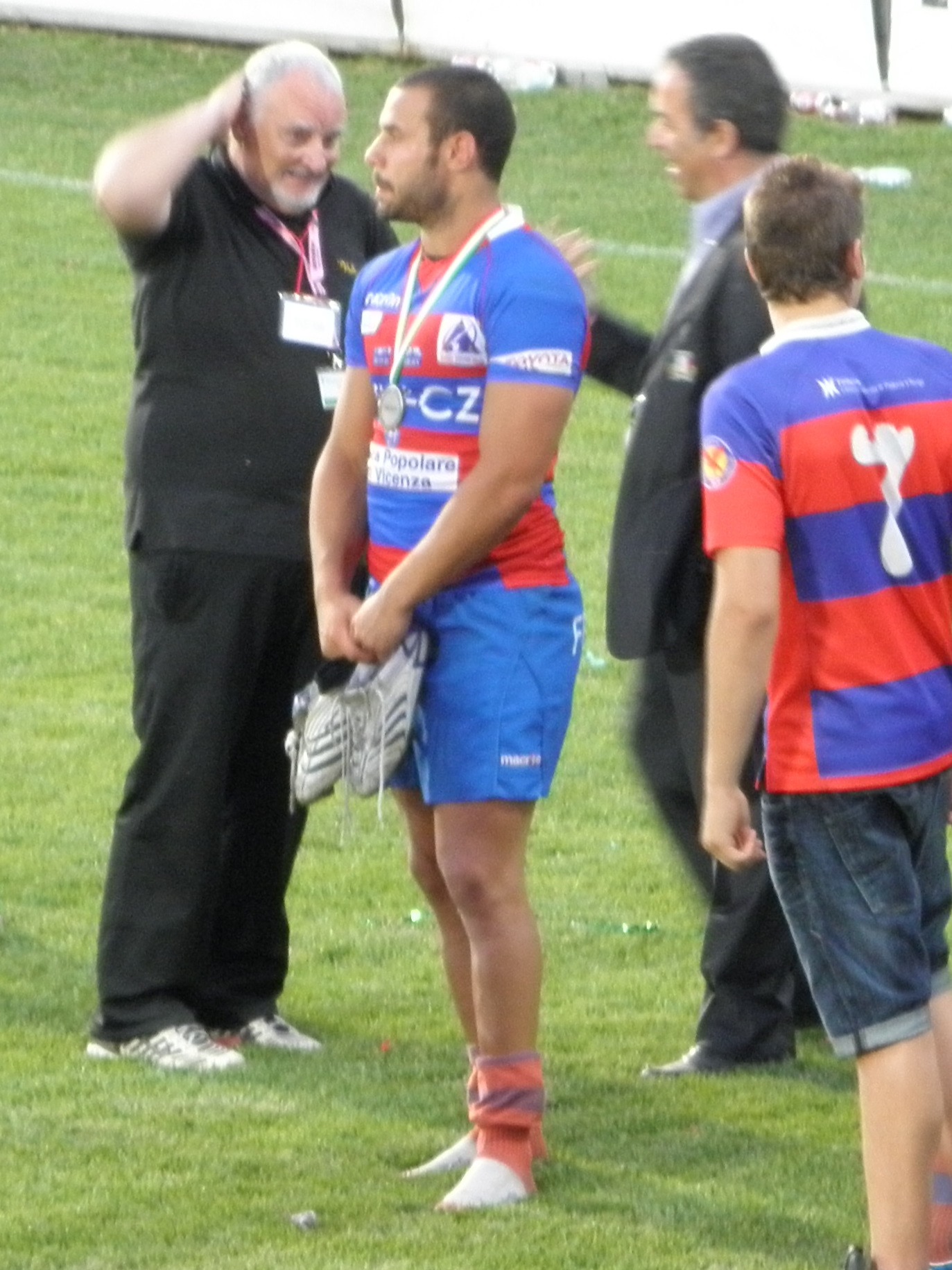
- Born: 4 July 1988 (age 38) Rovigo, Italy
- Height: 1.84 m (6 ft 0 in)
- Weight: 94 kg (14 st 11 lb; 207 lb)

Rugby union career
- Position: Wing
Youth career
- 2000−2006: Rovigo Delta
- 2006: Biarritz Olympique
Senior career
Years	Team	Apps	(Points)
2006−2013	Rovigo Delta	126	(170)
2013	→Zebre	2	(0)
2013−2019	Fiamme Oro	95	(170)
2019−2023	Rovigo Delta	50	(35)
- Correct as of 29 May 2020
International career
Years	Team	Apps	(Points)
2008	Italy Under 20	5	(10)
2009−2012	Emerging Italy	7	(20)
2009	Italy	2	(0)
- Correct as of 29 May 2020

Andrea Bacchetti (born Rovigo, 4 July 1988) was an Italian rugby union player. His usual position was as a Wing and he played for Rovigo Delta in Top12 from 2006 to 2013 and from 2019 to 2023. From October 2023, he is Team Manager of Rugby Rovigo Delta.

For 2012–13 Pro12 season, he named like Additional Player for Zebre.

In 2008 Bacchetti was named in the Italy Under 20 squad and in 2009 he is part of Italy squad for 2009 Six Nations and, from 2009 to 2012 Emerging Italy squad for official tests. He represented Italy on 2 occasions.
