= Luciano Orquera =

Italy international rugby union player

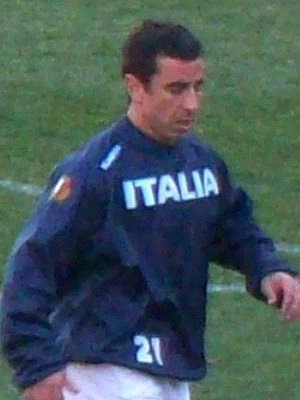
- Born: Luciano Orquera; 12 October 1981 (age 45) Córdoba, Argentina
- Height: 5 ft 7 in (1.70 m)
- Weight: 172 lb (78 kg; 12.3 st)

Rugby union career
- Position: Fly-half
Amateur team(s)
Years	Team	Apps	(Points)
- Club Palermo Bajo
2002-03	Mirano Rugby 1957		
2003–05	Petrarca		
2016-	Stade Niçois		
Senior career
Years	Team	Apps	(Points)
2005−06	Auch	12	(51)
2006−11	Brive	86	(420)
2011–12	Aironi	15	(109)
2012–15	Zebre	55	(242)
2015−16	Massy	19	(163)
International career
Years	Team	Apps	(Points)
2010	Italy A	3	(55)
2004–15	Italy	48	(154)

Luciano Orquera (born 12 October 1981 in Córdoba) is an Argentine-Italian rugby union player. He plays as a fly-half for Zebre, an Italian club in the Pro14.

== Rugby Union career ==
=== Amateur career ===
Born in Argentina of Italian descent, he first played at Club Palermo Bajo, in Córdoba. He moved to Mirano Rugby 1957 in 2002–03. He was assigned to Petrarca Padova Rugby in 2003–04, where he would stay the next two seasons.

In 2016 he signed for the French amateur club Stade Niçois who play in Fédérale 2.

=== Professional career ===
Orquera then moved to France, playing the 2005–06 season at Auch and the next five seasons at Brive. He returned to Italy for the 2011–12 season, signing with Aironi.

=== International career ===
Orquera is of Italian descent through a great-grandparent. After becoming a naturalized Italian citizen, he was first called into the Italy squad that beat Canada by 51–6 at L'Aquila, on 6 November 2004. The next year he made his debut in the 2005 Six Nations Championship, playing five matches and scoring one try and one penalty. He would be absent from the National Team from 2005 to 2008, when he was finally called up once again. He played twice in the 2009 Six Nations Championship. He returned once more to the Italy squad for the friendly with Argentina, as they lost 16–22, in Verona on 13 November 2010. He also played in the 2011 Six Nations Championship.

Orquera had his World Cup debut in the 2011 Rugby World Cup, playing in three games and scoring a try.

Orquera has 44 caps for Italy, with 3 tries, 18 conversions, 29 penalties and 2 drop goals scored, 144 points in aggregate.

He has also played regularly for Italy A, including being their captain.

Orquera started for Italy's opening RBS Six Nations 2013 match against France scoring ten points in an outstanding performance to give Italy a shock win by 23–18. After, he was awarded Man of the Match.
