= List of Italy national rugby union players =

List of Italy national rugby union players is a list of people who have played for the Italy national rugby union team. The list only includes players who have played in a Test match.

Note that the "position" column lists the position at which the player made his Test debut, not necessarily the position for which he is best known. A position in parentheses indicates that the player debuted as a substitute.

== List ==
Italy's International Rugby Capped Players
Number	Name	Position	Date first cap obtained	Opposition
1	Enrico Allevi	lock	1929-05-20	v Spain at Barcelona
2	Tommaso Altissimi	prop	1929-05-20	v Spain at Barcelona
3	Aldo Balducci	no. 8	1929-05-20	v Spain at Barcelona
4	Vittorio Barzaghi	lock	1929-05-20	v Spain at Barcelona
5	Ottavio Bottonelli	hooker	1929-05-20	v Spain at Barcelona
6	Luigi Bricchi	prop	1929-05-20	v Spain at Barcelona
7	Lucio Cesani	wing	1929-05-20	v Spain at Barcelona
8	Domenico Dondana	fullback	1929-05-20	v Spain at Barcelona
9	Giovanni Dora	centre	1929-05-20	v Spain at Barcelona
10	Alberto Modonesi	scrum-half	1929-05-20	v Spain at Barcelona
11	Piero Paselli	flanker	1929-05-20	v Spain at Barcelona
12	Carlo Raffo	flanker	1929-05-20	v Spain at Barcelona
13	Paolo Vinci II	centre	1929-05-20	v Spain at Barcelona
14	Francesco Vinci III	wing	1929-05-20	v Spain at Barcelona
15	Pietro Vinci IV	fly-half	1929-05-20	v Spain at Barcelona
16	Amando Nisti	(replacement)	1929-05-20	v Spain at Barcelona
17	Giovanni Paolin	(replacement)	1929-05-20	v Spain at Barcelona
18	Eugenio Vinci I	(replacement)	1929-05-20	v Spain at Barcelona
19	Giuseppe Bigi	scrum-half	1930-05-29	v Spain at Milan
20	Alberto di Bello	hooker	1930-05-29	v Spain at Milan
21	Angelo Morimondi	fullback	1930-05-29	v Spain at Milan
22	Ernesto Nathan	centre	1930-05-29	v Spain at Milan
23	Giuseppe Sessa	lock	1930-05-29	v Spain at Milan
24	Amerigo Centinari	(replacement)	1930-05-29	v Spain at Milan
25	Leandro Tagliabue	(replacement)	1930-05-29	v Spain at Milan
26	Ivan Aloisio	no. 8	1933-02-12	v Czech Republic at Milan
27	Aurelio Cazzini	wing	1933-02-12	v Czech Republic at Milan
28	Felice Colombo	lock	1933-02-12	v Czech Republic at Milan
29	Alberto Crespi	lock	1933-02-12	v Czech Republic at Milan
30	Giuseppe Gattoni	centre	1933-02-12	v Czech Republic at Milan
31	Renzo Maffioli	wing	1933-02-12	v Czech Republic at Milan
32	Umberto Moretti	(replacement)	1933-02-12	v Czech Republic at Milan
33	Ferdinando Tozzi	(replacement)	1933-02-12	v Czech Republic at Milan
34	Fernando Trebbi	(replacement)	1933-02-12	v Czech Republic at Milan
35	Riccardo Aymonod	fly-half	1933-04-16	v Czech Republic at Prague
36	Giorgio Bortolini	prop	1933-04-16	v Czech Republic at Prague
37	Mario Campagna	scrum-half	1933-04-16	v Czech Republic at Prague
38	Arrigo Marescalchi	no. 8	1933-04-16	v Czech Republic at Prague
39	Eraldo Sgorbati	flanker	1933-04-16	v Czech Republic at Prague
40	Ariosto Agosti	(replacement)	1933-04-16	v Czech Republic at Prague
41	Luigi Brighetti	flanker	1934-04-14	v Catalonia at Barcelona
42	Gastone de Angelis	lock	1934-04-14	v Catalonia at Barcelona
43	Angelo Albonico	lock	1934-12-26	v Romania at Milan
44	Giuseppe Piana	fullback	1934-12-26	v Romania at Milan
45	Giancarlo Zani	hooker	1934-12-26	v Romania at Milan
46	Orlando Maestri	prop	1935-03-24	v Catalonia at Genova
47	Giuseppe Visentin	flanker	1935-03-24	v Catalonia at Genova
48	Carlo Carloni	flanker	1935-04-22	v France XV at Rome
49	Riccardo Centinari	fullback	1935-04-22	v France XV at Rome
50	Renato de Marchis	scrum-half	1935-04-22	v France XV at Rome
51	Filippo Caccia Dominioni	(replacement)	1935-04-22	v France XV at Rome
52	Giulio Rizzoli	(replacement)	1935-04-22	v France XV at Rome
53	Vincenzo Bertolotto	lock	1936-05-14	v Germany at Berlin
54	Sandro Bonfante	hooker	1936-05-14	v Germany at Berlin
55	Tommaso Fattori	prop	1936-05-14	v Germany at Berlin
56	Arturo re Garbagnati	no. 8	1936-05-14	v Germany at Berlin
57	Guglielmo Zoffoli	prop	1936-05-14	v Germany at Berlin
58	Angelo Becca	no. 8	1937-04-25	v Romania at Bucharest
59	Carlo d'Alessio	wing	1937-04-25	v Romania at Bucharest
60	Renato Paciucci	hooker	1937-04-25	v Romania at Bucharest
61	Torriglio Carraro	(replacement)	1937-04-25	v Romania at Bucharest
62	Sandro Vigliano	(replacement)	1937-04-25	v Romania at Bucharest
63	Renato Bevilacqua	lock	1937-10-10	v Belgium at Paris
64	Renzo Cova	wing	1937-10-10	v Belgium at Paris
65	Ugo Stenta	lock	1937-10-10	v Belgium at Paris
66	Giuseppe Testoni	hooker	1937-10-10	v Belgium at Paris
67	Cesare Ghezzi	scrum-half	1938-03-06	v Germany at Stuttgart
68	Genesio Bonati	hooker	1939-02-11	v Germany at Milan
69	Lorenzo Clerici	fly-half	1939-02-11	v Germany at Milan
70	Orazio Bracaglia	prop	1939-04-29	v Romania at Rome
71	Mario Dotti	wing	1939-04-29	v Romania at Rome
72	Adolfo Francese	flanker	1939-04-29	v Romania at Rome
73	Mario Gorni	hooker	1939-04-29	v Romania at Rome
74	Ausonio Alacevich	(replacement)	1939-04-29	v Romania at Rome
75	Valerio Vagnetti	(replacement)	1939-04-29	v Romania at Rome
76	Mario Battaglini	flanker	1940-04-14	v Romania at Bucharest
77	Luigi Bossi	fullback	1940-04-14	v Romania at Bucharest
78	Arturo Costa	wing	1940-04-14	v Romania at Bucharest
79	Buby Farinelli	centre	1940-04-14	v Romania at Bucharest
80	Gianni Figari	prop	1940-04-14	v Romania at Bucharest
81	Eros Cicognani	flanker	1940-05-05	v Germany at Stuttgart
82	Ettore Parmiggiani	fly-half	1942-05-02	v Romania at Milan
83	Guido Romano	prop	1942-05-02	v Romania at Milan
84	Piero Romano	prop	1942-05-02	v Romania at Milan
85	Enrico Zanetti	flanker	1942-05-02	v Romania at Milan
86	Giuseppe Sessi	(replacement)	1942-05-02	v Romania at Milan
87	Aldo Battagion	scrum-half	1948-03-28	v France XV at Rovigo
88	Francesco Battaglini	flanker	1948-03-28	v France XV at Rovigo
89	Vittorio Borsetto	prop	1948-03-28	v France XV at Rovigo
90	Carlo de Vecchi	no. 8	1948-03-28	v France XV at Rovigo
91	Umberto Faccioli	fly-half	1948-03-28	v France XV at Rovigo
92	Enrico Fava	centre	1948-03-28	v France XV at Rovigo
93	Renzo Maini	flanker	1948-03-28	v France XV at Rovigo
94	Italo Mattacchini	hooker	1948-03-28	v France XV at Rovigo
95	Giuseppe Molinari	prop	1948-03-28	v France XV at Rovigo
96	Paolo Rosi	centre	1948-03-28	v France XV at Rovigo
97	Enrico Rossini	wing	1948-03-28	v France XV at Rovigo
98	Pietro Stievano	wing	1948-03-28	v France XV at Rovigo
99	Temistocle Tedeschi	fullback	1948-03-28	v France XV at Rovigo
100	Vittorio Vicariotto	lock	1948-03-28	v France XV at Rovigo
101	Sergio Barilari	lock	1948-05-23	v Czech Republic at Parma
102	Luciano Bove	lock	1948-05-23	v Czech Republic at Parma
103	Giovanni Favretto	prop	1948-05-23	v Czech Republic at Parma
104	Piero Gabrielli	flanker	1948-05-23	v Czech Republic at Parma
105	Primo Masci	no. 8	1948-05-23	v Czech Republic at Parma
106	Fulvio Pitorri	wing	1948-05-23	v Czech Republic at Parma
107	Silvano Tartaglini	fullback	1948-05-23	v Czech Republic at Parma
108	Mario Pisaneschi	(replacement)	1948-05-23	v Czech Republic at Parma
109	Giovanni Bonino	flanker	1949-03-27	v France XV at Marseille
110	Giogio Dagnini	scrum-half	1949-03-27	v France XV at Marseille
111	Sergio Lanfranchi	prop	1949-03-27	v France XV at Marseille
112	Piero Marini	fly-half	1949-03-27	v France XV at Marseille
113	Umberto Silvestri	lock	1949-03-27	v France XV at Marseille
114	Mario Turcato	prop	1949-03-27	v France XV at Marseille
115	Angelo Arrigoni	wing	1949-05-22	v Czech Republic at Prague
116	Giulio Cherubini	flanker	1949-05-22	v Czech Republic at Prague
117	Gianni del Bono	wing	1951-05-06	v Spain at Rome
118	Paolo Favaretto	hooker	1951-05-06	v Spain at Rome
119	Romildo Gabanella	prop	1951-05-06	v Spain at Rome
120	Rodolfo Giuliani	no. 8	1951-05-06	v Spain at Rome
121	Fausto Perrone	scrum-half	1951-05-06	v Spain at Rome
122	Leonardo Riccioni	lock	1951-05-06	v Spain at Rome
123	Paolo Dari	(replacement)	1951-05-06	v Spain at Rome
124	Gianni Aiolfi	no. 8	1952-04-13	v Spain at Barcelona
125	Aldo Cecchetto-Milani	scrum-half	1952-04-13	v Spain at Barcelona
126	Lamberto de Santis	hooker	1952-04-13	v Spain at Barcelona
127	Giorgio Fornari	prop	1952-04-13	v Spain at Barcelona
128	Enzo Gerosa	wing	1952-04-13	v Spain at Barcelona
129	Francis Martinenghi	centre	1952-04-13	v Spain at Barcelona
130	Riccardo Santopadre	fly-half	1952-04-13	v Spain at Barcelona
131	Luciano Turcato	flanker	1952-04-13	v Spain at Barcelona
132	Carlo Zucchi	wing	1952-04-13	v Spain at Barcelona
133	Giorgio Grasselli	prop	1952-04-27	v Germany at Padova
134	Gennaro Mancini	hooker	1952-04-27	v Germany at Padova
135	Emilio Andina	centre	1952-05-17	v France at Milan
136	Mario Percudani	no. 8	1952-05-17	v France at Milan
137	Giancarlo Malosti	flanker	1953-04-26	v France at Lyon
138	Nando Barbini	fullback	1953-05-17	v Germany at Hanover
139	Romano Bettarello	centre	1953-05-17	v Germany at Hanover
140	Gianfranco Zanchi	no. 8	1953-05-17	v Germany at Hanover
141	Italo Scodavolpe	lock	1954-04-19	v Spain at Naples
142	Remo Zanatta	centre	1954-04-19	v Spain at Naples
143	Sergio Silvestri	wing	1954-04-24	v France at Rome
144	Andrea Taveggia	prop	1954-04-24	v France at Rome
145	Alberto Comin	centre	1955-03-13	v Germany at Milan
146	Antonio Danieli	prop	1955-03-13	v Germany at Milan
147	Ciano Luise I	wing	1955-03-13	v Germany at Milan
148	Aldo Mioni	fly-half	1955-03-13	v Germany at Milan
149	Gianni Riccardi	lock	1955-03-13	v Germany at Milan
150	Matteo Silini	lock	1955-03-13	v Germany at Milan
151	Ivano Ponchia	wing	1955-04-10	v France at Grenoble
152	Maurizio Carli	fly-half	1955-07-18	v Spain at Barcelona
153	Franco Perrini	fullback	1955-07-18	v Spain at Barcelona
154	Gastone Cecchetto	centre	1955-07-21	v France XV at Barcelona
155	Franco Frelich	prop	1955-12-11	v Czech Republic at Rome
156	Carlo Cantoni	centre	1956-03-25	v Germany at Heidelberg
157	Umberto Levorato	prop	1956-03-25	v Germany at Heidelberg
158	Paolo Pescetto	wing	1956-03-25	v Germany at Heidelberg
159	Giovanni Raisi	lock	1956-03-25	v Germany at Heidelberg
160	Ferdinando Sartorato	scrum-half	1956-03-25	v Germany at Heidelberg
161	Lamberto Simonelli	flanker	1956-03-25	v Germany at Heidelberg
162	Arturo Zucchello	fly-half	1956-03-25	v Germany at Heidelberg
163	Giuseppe Bottacin	scrum-half	1956-04-29	v Czech Republic at Prague
164	Guglielmo Geremia	prop	1956-04-29	v Czech Republic at Prague
165	Guglielmo Colussi	centre	1957-04-21	v France at Agen
166	Natale Molari	wing	1957-04-21	v France at Agen
167	Enrico Saibene	fly-half	1957-04-21	v France at Agen
168	Sergio Brusin	scrum-half	1957-12-07	v Germany at Milan
169	Giancarlo Busson	centre	1957-12-07	v Germany at Milan
170	Giancarlo Navarrini	hooker	1957-12-07	v Germany at Milan
171	Riccardo Saetti	lock	1957-12-07	v Germany at Milan
172	Luciano Valtorta	flanker	1957-12-07	v Germany at Milan
173	Ottarino Bettarello	fly-half	1958-04-07	v France at Naples
174	Enzo Bellinazzo	centre	1958-12-07	v Romania at Catania
175	Gastone Biadene	centre	1958-12-07	v Romania at Catania
176	Massimo Braga	scrum-half	1958-12-07	v Romania at Catania
177	Antonio di Zitti	flanker	1958-12-07	v Romania at Catania
178	Paolo Quintavalla	lock	1958-12-07	v Romania at Catania
179	Pietro Sguario	wing	1958-12-07	v Romania at Catania
180	Lucio Avigo	hooker	1959-03-29	v France at Nantes
181	Roberto Luise III	no. 8	1959-03-29	v France at Nantes
182	Roberto Martini	centre	1959-03-29	v France at Nantes
183	Zefferino Rossi	flanker	1959-03-29	v France at Nantes
184	Alfio Angioli	prop	1960-04-10	v Germany at Hanover
185	Gian Maria del Bono	flanker	1960-04-10	v Germany at Hanover
186	Elio Fusco	scrum-half	1960-04-10	v Germany at Hanover
187	Basilio Rovelli	hooker	1960-04-10	v Germany at Hanover
188	Franco Zani	lock	1960-04-10	v Germany at Hanover
189	Angelo Autore	centre	1961-01-15	v Germany at Piacenza
190	Erasmo Augeri	fly-half	1962-04-22	v France at Brescia
191	Giorgio Troncon	centre	1962-04-22	v France at Brescia
192	Vittorio Ambron	wing	1962-05-27	v Germany at Berlin
193	Giorgio Ricciarelli	lock	1962-05-27	v Germany at Berlin
194	Marco Bollesan	no. 8	1963-04-14	v France at Grenoble
195	Giancarlo Degli Antoni	flanker	1963-04-14	v France at Grenoble
196	Franco Piccinini	lock	1963-04-14	v France at Grenoble
197	Giuseppe Martini	centre	1965-04-18	v France at Pau
198	Ivo Mazzucchelli	lock	1965-04-18	v France at Pau
199	Gianni Romagnoli	prop	1965-04-18	v France at Pau
200	Carlo Salmaso	wing	1965-04-18	v France at Pau
201	Dominico Armellin	flanker	1965-12-08	v Czech Republic at Livorno
202	Umberto Conforto	scrum-half	1965-12-08	v Czech Republic at Livorno
203	Ettore Giugovaz	fullback	1965-12-08	v Czech Republic at Livorno
204	Franco Mazzantini	prop	1965-12-08	v Czech Republic at Livorno
205	Romano Sciacol	centre	1965-12-08	v Czech Republic at Livorno
206	Francesco Soro II	fly-half	1965-12-08	v Czech Republic at Livorno
207	Eugenio Speziali	lock	1965-12-08	v Czech Republic at Livorno
208	Andrea d'Alberton	centre	1966-04-09	v France at Naples
209	Oreste Vene'	hooker	1966-04-09	v France at Naples
210	Gastone Giani	centre	1966-10-30	v Germany at Berlin
211	Luciano Modonesi	wing	1966-10-30	v Germany at Berlin
212	Loreto Cucchiarelli	flanker	1966-11-06	v Romania at L'Aquila
213	Carlo Prosperini	prop	1966-11-06	v Romania at L'Aquila
214	Franco Gargiulo	lock	1967-03-26	v France at Toulon
215	Adriano Agujari	wing	1967-05-07	v Portugal at Genova
216	Luciano Bosciano	scrum-half	1967-05-07	v Portugal at Genova
217	Franco Cioni	flanker	1967-05-07	v Portugal at Genova
218	Mauro Gatto	centre	1967-05-07	v Portugal at Genova
219	Giampiero Ricci	fly-half	1967-05-07	v Portugal at Genova
220	Uriele Silvestri	hooker	1967-05-07	v Portugal at Genova
221	Dalmazio Bertoli	lock	1967-05-14	v Romania at Bucharest
222	Maurizio Bocconcelli	prop	1967-05-14	v Romania at Bucharest
223	Mauro Mattei	wing	1967-05-14	v Romania at Bucharest
224	Roberto Cinelli	flanker	1968-05-12	v Portugal at Lisbon
225	Massimo Gini	prop	1968-05-12	v Portugal at Lisbon
226	Giuseppe Giorgio	lock	1968-05-12	v Portugal at Lisbon
227	Marco Pulli	centre	1968-05-12	v Portugal at Lisbon
228	Ettore Abbiati	prop	1968-11-03	v Germany at Venice
229	Claudio Della Valle	centre	1968-11-03	v Germany at Venice
230	Fernando Pignotti	centre	1968-11-03	v Germany at Venice
231	Ermanno Sgorbati	flanker	1968-11-03	v Germany at Venice
232	Adolfo Gerardo	hooker	1968-12-29	v Serbia and Montenegro at San Dona
233	Andrea Miele	prop	1968-12-29	v Serbia and Montenegro at San Dona
234	Franco Valier	flanker	1968-12-29	v Serbia and Montenegro at San Dona
235	Maurizio Finocchi	(replacement)	1968-12-29	v Serbia and Montenegro at San Dona
236	Walter Rista	(replacement)	1968-12-29	v Serbia and Montenegro at San Dona
237	Lucio Boccaletto	flanker	1969-03-02	v Bulgaria at Sofia
238	Raffaele D'Orazio	hooker	1969-03-02	v Bulgaria at Sofia
239	Pierluigi Pacifici	wing	1969-03-02	v Bulgaria at Sofia
240	Luigi Bettella	lock	1969-05-04	v Spain at L'Aquila
241	Italo Vittorini	(replacement)	1969-05-04	v Spain at L'Aquila
242	Alessandro Brunelli	hooker	1969-05-10	v Belgium at Brussels
243	Elio Michelon	wing	1969-05-10	v Belgium at Brussels
244	Giancarlo Delli Ficorilli	hooker	1969-11-09	v France XV at Catania
245	Rocco Caligiuri	(replacement)	1969-11-09	v France XV at Catania
246	Gianmatteo Cecchin	fly-half	1970-04-26	v Czech Republic at Prague
247	Lelio Lazzarini	centre	1970-04-26	v Czech Republic at Prague
248	Guido Porzio	lock	1970-04-26	v Czech Republic at Prague
249	Corrado Possamai	prop	1970-04-26	v Czech Republic at Prague
250	Luigi Bernabo	lock	1970-05-24	v Madagascar at Tananarive
251	Angelo Sagramora	scrum-half	1970-05-24	v Madagascar at Tananarive
252	Aldo Caluzzi	centre	1970-10-25	v Romania at Rovigo
253	Pietro Monfeli	hooker	1970-10-25	v Romania at Rovigo
254	Isidoro Quaglio	lock	1970-10-25	v Romania at Rovigo
255	Angelo Visentin	scrum-half	1970-10-25	v Romania at Rovigo
256	Umberto Cossara	lock	1971-02-21	v Morocco at Naples
257	Francesco di Maura	lock	1971-02-21	v Morocco at Naples
258	Francesco Dotto	wing	1971-02-21	v Morocco at Naples
259	Loris Salsi	flanker	1971-02-21	v Morocco at Naples
260	Giuseppe Puglisi	flanker	1971-02-28	v France XV at Nice
261	Romano Baraldi	wing	1971-04-11	v Romania at Bucharest
262	Savino Colombini	prop	1971-04-11	v Romania at Bucharest
263	Ettore Piras	(replacement)	1971-04-11	v Romania at Bucharest
264	Faustino Crepaz	wing	1972-02-20	v Portugal at Padova
265	Agostino Puppo	scrum-half	1972-02-20	v Portugal at Padova
266	Giancarlo Cecotti	no. 8	1972-04-02	v Portugal at Lisbon
267	Mario Galletto	fly-half	1972-04-02	v Portugal at Lisbon
268	Paolo Paoletti	hooker	1972-04-02	v Portugal at Lisbon
269	Giovanni di Cola	(replacement)	1972-05-14	v Spain at Madrid
270	Ambrogio Bona	prop	1972-05-21	v Spain at Ivrea
271	Franco Paganelli	(replacement)	1972-05-21	v Spain at Ivrea
272	Salvatore Bonetti	lock	1972-11-26	v Serbia and Montenegro at Aosta
273	Elio De Anna	wing	1972-11-26	v Serbia and Montenegro at Aosta
274	Adriano Fedrigo	lock	1972-11-26	v Serbia and Montenegro at Aosta
275	Nello Francescato	centre	1972-11-26	v Serbia and Montenegro at Aosta
276	Fabio Gargiullo	centre	1972-11-26	v Serbia and Montenegro at Aosta
277	Manrico Marchetto	wing	1972-11-26	v Serbia and Montenegro at Aosta
278	Francesco Vialetto	fullback	1972-11-26	v Serbia and Montenegro at Aosta
279	Giorgio Lari	(replacement)	1972-11-26	v Serbia and Montenegro at Aosta
280	Edano Cottafava	wing	1973-02-25	v Portugal at Coimbra
281	Paolo Fedrigo	prop	1973-02-25	v Portugal at Coimbra
282	Mario Piovan	lock	1973-02-25	v Portugal at Coimbra
283	Crescenzo Vitelli	(replacement)	1973-02-25	v Portugal at Coimbra
284	Anacleto Altigieri	prop	1973-06-16	v Zimbabwe at Harare
285	Gerardo Cinti	wing	1973-06-16	v Zimbabwe at Harare
286	Gilberto Luchini	centre	1973-06-16	v Zimbabwe at Harare
287	Andrea Selvaggio	wing	1973-06-16	v Zimbabwe at Harare
288	Antonio Spagnoli	(replacement)	1973-06-16	v Zimbabwe at Harare
289	Antonio Rocca	(replacement)	1973-06-20	v Platinum Leopards at Potchefstroom
290	Arturo Bergamasco	wing	1973-06-23	v Border Bulldogs at East London
291	Renzo Ganzerla	wing	1973-06-23	v Border Bulldogs at East London
292	Luigi Mattarolo	fullback	1973-06-23	v Border Bulldogs at East London
293	Fabio Molinari	centre	1973-06-27	v North-East Transvaal at Cradock
294	Marco Pitorri	(replacement)	1973-06-27	v North-East Transvaal at Cradock
295	Carlo Loranzi	(replacement)	1973-06-30	v Natal Sharks at Durban
296	Paolo Gargiullo	(replacement)	1973-07-09	v Northern Free State at Welkom
297	Franco Baraldi	centre	1973-11-04	v Czech Republic at Rovigo
298	Giancarlo Checchinato	lock	1973-11-04	v Czech Republic at Rovigo
299	Ennio Ponzi	wing	1973-11-04	v Czech Republic at Rovigo
300	Nino Rossi	wing	1973-11-11	v Serbia and Montenegro at Zagreb
301	Raffaello Salvan	centre	1973-11-11	v Serbia and Montenegro at Zagreb
302	Pietro Vezzani	centre	1973-11-11	v Serbia and Montenegro at Zagreb
303	Bernadino di Cola	centre	1973-11-21	v Australia XV at L'Aquila
304	Antonio Tassin	flanker	1973-11-21	v Australia XV at L'Aquila
305	Mauro Zingarelli	hooker	1973-11-21	v Australia XV at L'Aquila
306	Giancarlo Cucchiella	(replacement)	1973-11-21	v Australia XV at L'Aquila
307	Pasquale Presutti	prop	1974-03-15	v Middlesex at London
308	Edoardo Scalzotto	centre	1974-03-15	v Middlesex at London
309	Evelino Aio	scrum-half	1974-05-05	v Germany at Rho
310	Fiorenzo Blessano	centre	1975-02-15	v France XV at Rome
311	Fulvio di Carlo	prop	1975-04-06	v Spain at Madrid
312	Paolo Ferracin	hooker	1975-04-27	v Romania at Bucharest
313	Pierluigi Camiscioni	lock	1975-09-13	v England Under-23s at Gosforth
314	Antonio Falancia	scrum-half	1975-09-13	v England Under-23s at Gosforth
315	Gianni Franceschini	scrum-half	1975-11-23	v Netherlands at Apeldoorn
316	Fabrizio Gaetaniello	(replacement)	1975-11-23	v Netherlands at Apeldoorn
317	Eusebio Passarotto	(replacement)	1975-12-20	v Spain at Madrid
318	Giorgio Morelli	(replacement)	1976-02-07	v France XV at Milan
319	Paolo Mariani	flanker	1976-04-24	v Romania at Parma
320	Narciso Zanella	flanker	1976-10-21	v Japan at Padova
321	Ercole Manni	(replacement)	1976-10-21	v Japan at Padova
322	Rino Francescato	centre	1976-11-27	v Spain at Rome
323	Claudio Appiani	(replacement)	1976-11-27	v Spain at Rome
324	Serafino Ghizzoni	wing	1977-02-06	v France XV at Grenoble
325	Massimo Mascioletti	wing	1977-03-06	v Morocco at Casablanca
326	Sabatino Pace	no. 8	1977-03-06	v Morocco at Casablanca
327	Andrea Rinaldo	lock	1977-03-06	v Morocco at Casablanca
328	Alessandro Zanella	fullback	1977-03-06	v Morocco at Casablanca
329	Carlo Casagrande	(replacement)	1977-05-01	v Romania at Bucharest
330	Giuseppe Artuso	lock	1977-10-23	v Poland at Warsaw
331	Crescenzo Bentivoglio	fullback	1977-10-23	v Poland at Warsaw
332	Luciano Borsetto	prop	1977-10-23	v Poland at Warsaw
333	Oscar Collodo	fly-half	1977-10-23	v Poland at Warsaw
334	Andrea Lijoi	no. 8	1977-10-23	v Poland at Warsaw
335	Paolo Pavesi	hooker	1977-10-23	v Poland at Warsaw
336	Lucio Pelliccione	centre	1977-10-23	v Poland at Warsaw
337	Bruno Francescato	centre	1977-10-29	v Czech Republic at Prague
338	Nick Screnci	prop	1977-10-29	v Czech Republic at Prague
339	Loredano Zuin	fullback	1977-10-29	v Czech Republic at Prague
340	Claudio Robazza	hooker	1978-10-24	v Argentina at Rovigo
341	Giafranco Barbini	(replacement)	1978-11-18	v Russia at Rome
342	Bruno Ancillotti	scrum-half	1978-12-17	v Spain at Treviso
343	Stefano Bettarello	fly-half	1979-04-14	v Poland at L'Aquila
344	Luciano Catotti	no. 8	1979-04-14	v Poland at L'Aquila
345	Donato Daldoss	lock	1979-04-14	v Poland at L'Aquila
346	Giorgio Fanton	(replacement)	1979-04-14	v Poland at L'Aquila
347	Luca Bonaiti	wing	1979-04-22	v Romania at Bucharest
348	Giancarlo Pivetta	(replacement)	1979-04-22	v Romania at Bucharest
349	Concetto Angelozzi	scrum-half	1979-05-16	v England Under-23s at Brescia
350	Franco Bargelli	flanker	1979-05-16	v England Under-23s at Brescia
351	Louis Basei	lock	1979-05-16	v England Under-23s at Brescia
352	Gianluca Limone	centre	1979-05-16	v England Under-23s at Brescia
353	Fulvio Lorigiola	scrum-half	1979-09-18	v Spain at Makarska
354	Andrea Angrisani	no. 8	1979-09-20	v Morocco at Makarska
355	Fabio Trentin	fly-half	1979-09-20	v Morocco at Makarska
356	Massimo Trippitelli	lock	1979-09-30	v Poland at Sochaczew
357	Claudio Torresan	fullback	1980-02-17	v France XV at Clermont-Ferrand
358	Stefano Annibal	lock	1980-06-14	v Fiji at Suva
359	Fabrizio Sintich	(replacement)	1980-06-14	v Fiji at Suva
360	Claudio Tinari	(replacement)	1980-07-05	v Junior All Blacks at Auckland
361	Renato de Bernardo	prop	1980-11-02	v Russia at Rovigo
362	Mario Pavin	flanker	1980-11-02	v Russia at Rovigo
363	Fabio Gaetaniello	(replacement)	1980-12-21	v Spain at Madrid
364	Alberto Osti	wing	1981-03-08	v France XV at Rovigo
365	Gianni Zanon	no. 8	1981-03-08	v France XV at Rovigo
366	Mauro Gardin	lock	1981-10-25	v Russia at Moscow
367	Claudio Jannone	flanker	1981-10-25	v Russia at Moscow
368	Guido Rossi	lock	1981-10-25	v Russia at Moscow
369	Alessandro Ghini	(replacement)	1981-10-25	v Russia at Moscow
370	Andrea Azzali	wing	1981-11-29	v Germany at Rovigo
371	Marzio Innocenti	flanker	1981-11-29	v Germany at Rovigo
372	Giancarlo Morelli	centre	1981-11-29	v Germany at Rovigo
373	Claudio Colusso	centre	1982-02-21	v France XV at Carcassonne
374	Mario Nicolosi	lock	1982-04-11	v Romania at Rovigo
375	Alessandro Fusco	(replacement)	1982-05-22	v England Under-23s at Padova
376	Stefano Romagnoli	prop	1982-12-19	v Morocco at Casablanca
377	Antonio Colella	lock	1983-04-10	v Romania at Buzau
378	Luigi de Joanni	(replacement)	1983-06-25	v Canada at Burnaby Lake
379	Edgardo Venturi	wing	1983-07-01	v Canada at Toronto
380	Luca Pelliccione	flanker	1983-09-07	v Spain at Casablanca
381	Mario Fumei	no. 8	1984-02-19	v France XV at Chalon-sur-Saône
382	Giovanni Petralia	lock	1984-02-19	v France XV at Chalon-sur-Saône
383	Mariano Crescenzo	(replacement)	1984-04-22	v Romania at L'Aquila
384	Mauro Quaglio	(replacement)	1984-10-20	v Tunisia at Monastir
385	Raffaele Dolfato	flanker	1985-03-03	v France XV at Treviso
386	Roberto Corvo	(replacement)	1985-03-03	v France XV at Treviso
387	Franco Berni	lock	1985-04-14	v Romania at Brasov
388	Stefano Barba	(replacement)	1985-04-14	v Romania at Brasov
389	Antonio Galeazzo	hooker	1985-05-18	v Spain at Mantova
390	Filipo Vittadello	fullback	1985-05-18	v Spain at Mantova
391	Francesco Salvadego	flanker	1985-06-22	v Zimbabwe at Bulawayo
392	Daniele Tebaldi	fly-half	1985-06-22	v Zimbabwe at Bulawayo
393	Stefano Boccazzi	(replacement)	1985-06-22	v Zimbabwe at Bulawayo
394	Sergio Appiani	flanker	1985-12-07	v Romania at L'Aquila
395	Luigi Troiani	fullback	1985-12-07	v Romania at L'Aquila
396	Sergio Zorzi	centre	1985-12-07	v Romania at L'Aquila
397	Alvise Russo	no. 8	1986-05-10	v England XV at Rome
398	Marcello Cuttitta	wing	1987-01-18	v Portugal at Lisbon
399	Piergianni Farina	flanker	1987-02-22	v France XV at Padova
400	Tito Lupini	prop	1987-04-12	v Romania at Constanta
401	Rodolfo Ambrosio	fly-half	1987-05-22	v New Zealand at Auckland
402	Francesco Pietrosanti	scrum-half	1987-11-07	v Russia at Kishinev
403	Pietro Reale	no. 8	1987-11-07	v Russia at Kishinev
404	Luigi Salvati	wing	1987-11-07	v Russia at Kishinev
405	Carlo de Baise	wing	1987-12-05	v Spain at Barcelona
406	Massimo Bonomi	fly-half	1988-02-07	v France XV at Monte Carlo
407	Corrado Covi	no. 8	1988-02-07	v France XV at Monte Carlo
408	Roberto Favaro	lock	1988-02-07	v France XV at Monte Carlo
409	Moreno Trevisiol	hooker	1988-02-07	v France XV at Monte Carlo
410	Carlo Pratichetti	hooker	1988-04-02	v Romania at Milan
411	Roberto Saetti	(replacement)	1988-11-05	v Russia at Treviso
412	Massimo Brunello	wing	1988-12-31	v Ireland at Lansdowne Road
413	Giulio Morelli	centre	1988-12-31	v Ireland at Lansdowne Road
414	Vittorio Pesce	no. 8	1988-12-31	v Ireland at Lansdowne Road
415	Luigi Capitani	fullback	1989-02-19	v France XV at Brescia
416	Giovanni Grespan	prop	1989-02-19	v France XV at Brescia
417	Enrico Ceselin	(replacement)	1989-02-19	v France XV at Brescia
418	Guido Porcellato	flanker	1989-04-15	v Romania at Bucharest
419	Alessandro Caranci	(replacement)	1989-04-15	v Romania at Bucharest
420	Massimo Bimbati	wing	1989-09-30	v Zimbabwe at Treviso
421	Mose de Stefani	hooker	1989-09-30	v Zimbabwe at Treviso
422	Pierpaolo Pedroni	lock	1989-09-30	v Zimbabwe at Treviso
423	Massimo Giovanelli	(replacement)	1989-09-30	v Zimbabwe at Treviso
424	Massimo Cuttitta	prop	1990-04-07	v Poland at Naples
425	Franco Properzi	prop	1990-04-07	v Poland at Naples
426	Mauro Tommasi	(replacement)	1990-04-07	v Poland at Naples
427	Umberto Casellato	scrum-half	1990-09-30	v Spain at Rovigo
428	Carlo Checchinato	lock	1990-09-30	v Spain at Rovigo
429	Giambattista Croci	lock	1990-09-30	v Spain at Rovigo
430	Massimo Goti	hooker	1990-10-03	v Netherlands at Treviso
431	Stefano Bordon	centre	1990-10-07	v Romania at Padova
432	Ivan Francescato	scrum-half	1990-10-07	v Romania at Padova
433	Antonio Piazza	prop	1990-11-24	v Russia at Rovigo
434	Gustavo Milano	(replacement)	1990-11-24	v Russia at Rovigo
435	Diego Domínguez	centre	1991-03-02	v France XV at Rome
436	Paolo Vaccari	wing	1991-06-15	v Namibia at Windhoek
437	Alessandro Bottacchiari	flanker	1991-10-13	v New Zealand at Leicester
438	Walter Cristofoletto	flanker	1992-04-18	v Romania at Rovigo
439	Daniele Sesenna	lock	1992-04-18	v Romania at Rovigo
440	Tito Cicciò	no. 8	1992-10-01	v Romania at Rome
441	Julian Gardner	flanker	1992-10-01	v Romania at Rome
442	Mark Giacheri	lock	1992-10-01	v Romania at Rome
443	Ramiro Cassina	(replacement)	1992-10-01	v Romania at Rome
444	Carlo Orlandi	hooker	1992-12-19	v Scotland A at Melrose
445	Stefano Rigo	flanker	1992-12-19	v Scotland A at Melrose
446	Piermassimiliano Dotto	(replacement)	1993-02-14	v Spain at Madrid
447	Fabio Coppo	(replacement)	1993-02-20	v France XV at Treviso
448	Mauro Dal Sie	prop	1993-04-17	v Portugal at Coimbra
449	Hector de Marco	fly-half	1993-04-17	v Portugal at Coimbra
450	Gabriel Filizzola	fullback	1993-04-17	v Portugal at Coimbra
451	Alessandro Moscardi	hooker	1993-04-17	v Portugal at Coimbra
452	Leonardo Perziano	wing	1993-04-17	v Portugal at Coimbra
453	Giuliano Faltibà	(replacement)	1993-04-17	v Portugal at Coimbra
454	Andrea Sgorlon	(replacement)	1993-04-17	v Portugal at Coimbra
455	Massimiliano Capuzzoni	flanker	1993-06-17	v Croatia at Perpignan
456	Massimo Ravazzolo	wing	1993-06-17	v Croatia at Perpignan
457	Vittorio d'Anna	wing	1993-11-06	v Russia at Moscow
458	Orazio Arancio	(replacement)	1993-11-06	v Russia at Moscow
459	Danilo Beretta	flanker	1993-12-18	v Scotland A at Rovigo
460	Roberto Crotti	wing	1993-12-18	v Scotland A at Rovigo
461	Nicola Aldrovandi	centre	1994-05-07	v Spain at Parma
462	Claudio de Rossi	flanker	1994-05-07	v Spain at Parma
463	Alessandro Troncon	(replacement)	1994-05-07	v Spain at Parma
464	Javier Pértile	fullback	1994-05-14	v Romania at Bucharest
465	Andrea Castellani	prop	1994-05-18	v Czech Republic at Viadana
466	Mario Gerosa	wing	1994-05-18	v Czech Republic at Viadana
467	Diego Scaglia	lock	1994-10-01	v Romania at Catania
468	Massimo Alfonsetti	hooker	1994-12-04	v France XV at Digione
469	Marco Platania	wing	1994-12-04	v France XV at Digione
470	Francesco Mazzariol	wing	1995-10-14	v France at Buenos Aires
471	Fabio Roselli	wing	1995-10-14	v France at Buenos Aires
472	Carlo Caione	(replacement)	1995-10-21	v Romania at Buenos Aires
473	Matteo Piovene	(replacement)	1995-10-28	v New Zealand at Bologna
474	Nicola Mazzucato	wing	1995-11-12	v South Africa at Rome
475	Federico Williams	fullback	1995-11-12	v South Africa at Rome
476	Tommaso Visentin	centre	1996-01-16	v Wales at Cardiff
477	Giampiero de Carli	(replacement)	1996-01-16	v Wales at Cardiff
478	Simone Babbo	wing	1996-03-02	v Portugal at Lisbon
479	Andrea Gritti	lock	1996-03-02	v Portugal at Lisbon
480	Gianluca Guidi	scrum-half	1996-03-02	v Portugal at Lisbon
481	Piergiorgi Menapace	(replacement)	1996-03-02	v Portugal at Lisbon
482	Riccardo Piovan	(replacement)	1996-03-02	v Portugal at Lisbon
483	Leandro Manteri	wing	1996-10-05	v Wales at Rome
484	Roberto Rampazzo	(replacement)	1996-10-05	v Wales at Rome
485	Andrea Barattin	(replacement)	1996-10-23	v Australia at Padova
486	Cristian Stoica	centre	1997-01-04	v Ireland at Lansdowne Road
487	Luca Martin	(replacement)	1997-10-18	v France at Auch
488	Manuel Dallan	centre	1997-10-22	v Argentina at Lourdes
489	Andrea Moretti	(replacement)	1997-10-26	v Romania at Tarbes
490	Corrado Pilat	fullback	1997-12-20	v Ireland at Bologna
491	Stefano Saviozzi	hooker	1998-04-18	v Russia at Krasnoyarsk
492	Mauro Bergamasco	flanker	1998-11-18	v Netherlands at Huddersfield
493	Matt Pini	fullback	1998-11-18	v Netherlands at Huddersfield
494	Simone Stocco	lock	1998-11-18	v Netherlands at Huddersfield
495	Michele Birtig	(replacement)	1998-11-18	v Netherlands at Huddersfield
496	Giuseppe Lanzi	(replacement)	1998-11-18	v Netherlands at Huddersfield
497	Giampiero Mazzi	(replacement)	1998-11-18	v Netherlands at Huddersfield
498	Nanni Raineri	(replacement)	1998-11-18	v Netherlands at Huddersfield
499	Marco Baroni	wing	1999-01-30	v France XV at Genova
500	Denis Dallan	centre	1999-01-30	v France XV at Genova
501	Giacomo Preo	centre	1999-04-10	v Ireland at Lansdowne Road
502	Wim Visser	(replacement)	1999-04-10	v Ireland at Lansdowne Road
503	Gianluca Faliva	(replacement)	1999-06-19	v South Africa at Durban
504	Laurent Travini	(replacement)	1999-06-19	v South Africa at Durban
505	Sandro Ceppolino	(replacement)	1999-08-22	v Uruguay at L'Aquila
506	Andrea de Rossi	(replacement)	1999-08-22	v Uruguay at L'Aquila
507	Andrea Scanavacca	(replacement)	1999-08-22	v Uruguay at L'Aquila
508	Luciano Cornella	no. 8	1999-08-26	v Spain at L'Aquila
509	Andrea Masi	fullback	1999-08-26	v Spain at L'Aquila
510	Federico Pucciariello	prop	1999-08-26	v Spain at L'Aquila
511	Nick Zisti	wing	1999-10-02	v England at Twickenham
512	Alejandro Moreno	prop	1999-10-10	v Tonga at Leicester
513	Tino Paoletti	prop	2000-02-05	v Scotland at Rome
514	Matteo Mazzantini	(replacement)	2000-02-05	v Scotland at Rome
515	Aaron Persico	(replacement)	2000-02-05	v Scotland at Rome
516	Marco Rivaro	(replacement)	2000-02-05	v Scotland at Rome
517	Juan Francesio	(replacement)	2000-02-19	v Wales at Millennium Stadium
518	Salvatore Perugini	(replacement)	2000-03-04	v Ireland at Lansdowne Road
519	Andrea Lo Cicero Vaina	prop	2000-03-18	v England at Rome
520	Ramiro Pez	fly-half	2000-07-08	v Samoa at Apia
521	Juan Manuel Queirolo	scrum-half	2000-07-08	v Samoa at Apia
522	David dal Maso	(replacement)	2000-07-08	v Samoa at Apia
523	Luca Mastrodomenico	(replacement)	2000-07-08	v Samoa at Apia
524	Lisandro Villagra	(replacement)	2000-07-08	v Samoa at Apia
525	Maurizio Zaffiri	(replacement)	2000-07-15	v Fiji at Lautoka
526	Filippo Frati	scrum-half	2000-11-11	v Canada at Rovigo
527	Andrea Muraro	prop	2000-11-11	v Canada at Rovigo
528	Fabio Ongaro	flanker	2000-11-11	v Canada at Rovigo
529	Massimiliano Perziano	wing	2000-11-25	v New Zealand at Genova
530	Ezio Galon	(replacement)	2001-02-03	v Ireland at Rome
531	Walter Pozzebon	(replacement)	2001-02-03	v Ireland at Rome
532	Giovanni Antoni	fullback	2001-06-23	v Namibia at Windhoek
533	Marco Bortolami	flanker	2001-06-23	v Namibia at Windhoek
534	Roberto Pedrazzi	(replacement)	2001-06-23	v Namibia at Windhoek
535	Salvatore Garozzo	flanker	2001-07-07	v Uruguay at Montevideo
536	Andrea Benatti	(replacement)	2001-11-10	v Fiji at Treviso
537	Samuele Pace	(replacement)	2001-11-17	v South Africa at Genova
538	Cristian Zanoletti	(replacement)	2001-11-24	v Samoa at L'Aquila
539	Santiago Dellapè	lock	2002-02-02	v France at Stade de France
540	Matthew Phillips	no. 8	2002-02-02	v France at Stade de France
541	Mirco Bergamasco	(replacement)	2002-02-02	v France at Stade de France
542	Gert Peens	fullback	2002-03-02	v Wales at Millennium Stadium
543	Carlos Nieto	(replacement)	2002-04-07	v England at Rome
544	Ramiro Martínez	prop	2002-06-08	v New Zealand at Hamilton
545	Sergio Parisse	no. 8	2002-06-08	v New Zealand at Hamilton
546	Matteo Barbini	(replacement)	2002-06-08	v New Zealand at Hamilton
547	Martín Castrogiovanni	(replacement)	2002-06-08	v New Zealand at Hamilton
548	Enrico Pavanello	lock	2002-09-28	v Romania at Parma
549	Scott Palmer	no. 8	2002-11-16	v Argentina at Rome
550	Cristian Bezzi	lock	2003-02-15	v Wales at Rome
551	Carlo Festuccia	hooker	2003-02-15	v Wales at Rome
552	Gonzalo Canale	(replacement)	2003-08-23	v Scotland at Murrayfield
553	Diego Saccà	wing	2003-08-30	v Ireland at Limerick
554	Rima Wakarua-Noema	fly-half	2003-10-15	v Tonga at Canberra
555	Paul Griffen	scrum-half	2004-02-15	v England at Rome
556	Roland de Marigny	(replacement)	2004-02-15	v England at Rome
557	Silvio Orlando	(replacement)	2004-02-15	v England at Rome
558	Roberto Mandelli	(replacement)	2004-03-20	v Ireland at Lansdowne Road
559	Simon Picone	(replacement)	2004-03-20	v Ireland at Lansdowne Road
560	Carlo Del Fava	lock	2004-03-27	v Wales at Millennium Stadium
561	Salvatore Costanzo	prop	2004-06-26	v Romania at Bucharest
562	Kaine Robertson	wing	2004-06-26	v Romania at Bucharest
563	Danilo Carpente	(replacement)	2004-06-26	v Romania at Bucharest
564	Giorgio Intoppa	(replacement)	2004-06-26	v Romania at Bucharest
565	Mario Savi	(replacement)	2004-06-26	v Romania at Bucharest
566	Ludovico Nitoglia	wing	2004-11-06	v Canada at L'Aquila
567	Luciano Orquera	(replacement)	2004-11-06	v Canada at L'Aquila
568	Pietro Travagli	(replacement)	2004-11-06	v Canada at L'Aquila
569	Matteo Pratichetti	wing	2004-11-13	v New Zealand at Rome
570	Valerio Bernabò	lock	2004-11-27	v United States of America at Biella-in-Piedmont
571	Antonio Mannato	(replacement)	2004-11-27	v United States of America at Biella-in-Piedmont
572	Josh Sole	flanker	2005-06-11	v Argentina at Salta
573	Antonio Pavanello	(replacement)	2005-06-11	v Argentina at Salta
574	Pablo Canavosio	(replacement)	2005-06-25	v Australia at Melbourne
575	Michele Rizzo	(replacement)	2005-06-25	v Australia at Melbourne
576	Matias Aguero	(replacement)	2005-11-12	v Tonga at Prato
577	Alessandro Zanni	(replacement)	2005-11-12	v Tonga at Prato
578	David Bortolussi	fullback	2006-06-11	v Japan at Tokyo
579	Benjamin de Jager	wing	2006-06-11	v Japan at Tokyo
580	Robert Barbieri	(replacement)	2006-06-11	v Japan at Tokyo
581	Leonardo Ghiraldini	(replacement)	2006-06-11	v Japan at Tokyo
582	Andrea Marcato	(replacement)	2006-06-11	v Japan at Tokyo
583	Michele Sepe	(replacement)	2006-06-11	v Japan at Tokyo
584	Fabio Staibano	(replacement)	2006-06-11	v Japan at Tokyo
585	Marko Stanojevic	wing	2006-10-07	v Portugal at L'Aquila
586	Warren Spragg	wing	2006-11-25	v Canada at Fontanafredda
587	Kris Burton	fullback	2007-06-02	v Uruguay at Montevideo
588	Enrico Patrizio	centre	2007-06-02	v Uruguay at Montevideo
589	Alessio Galante	(replacement)	2007-06-02	v Uruguay at Montevideo
590	Ratu Vosawai	(replacement)	2007-08-18	v Japan at Aosta
591	Lorenzo Cittadini	(prop)	2008-02-02	v Ireland at Croke Park
592	Tommaso Reato	(lock)	2008-02-02	v Ireland at Croke Park
593	Alberto Sgarbi	(centre)	2008-02-10	v England at Rome
594	Paolo Buso	(fly-half)	2008-02-23	v Wales at Millennium Stadium
595	Jaco Erasmus	(lock)	2008-03-09	v France at Stade de France
596	Gonzalo García	centre	2008-06-21	v South Africa at Cape Town
597	Luke McLean	fly-half	2008-06-21	v South Africa at Cape Town
598	Ignacio Fernández Rouyet	(prop)	2008-06-21	v South Africa at Cape Town
599	Riccardo Pavan	(fullback)	2008-06-21	v South Africa at Cape Town
600	Giulio Toniolatti	(scrum-half)	2008-11-08	v Australia at Padova
601	Jean-François Montauriol	(lock)	2009-02-07	v England at Twickenham
602	Andrea Bacchetti	(wing)	2009-02-15	v Ireland at Rome
603	Giulio Rubini	(fullback)	2009-02-28	v Scotland at Murrayfield
604	Franco Sbaraglini	(hooker)	2009-02-28	v Scotland at Murrayfield
605	Roberto Quartaroli	(centre)	2009-03-14	v Wales at Rome
606	Quintin Geldenhuys	lock	2009-06-13	v Australia at Canberra
607	Craig Gower	fly-half	2009-06-13	v Australia at Canberra
608	Paul Derbyshire	(flanker)	2009-06-13	v Australia at Canberra
609	Tito Tebaldi	(scrum-half)	2009-06-13	v Australia at Canberra
610	Simone Favaro	flanker	2009-06-20	v Australia at Melbourne
611	Riccardo Bocchino	(fly-half)	2010-02-06	v Ireland at Croke Park
612	Tommaso Benvenuti	winger	2010-11-13	v Argentina at Verona
613	Edoardo Gori	scrum-half	2010-11-20	v Australia at Firenze
614	Fabio Semenzato	scrum-half	2011-02-12	v England at Twickenham
615	Tommaso D'Apice	(hooker)	2011-08-13	v Japan at Cesena
616	Corniel van Zyl	(lock)	2011-08-13	v Japan at Cesena
617	Joshua Furno	(lock)	2011-08-20	v Scotland at Murrayfield
618	Giovanbattista Venditti	winger	2012-02-04	v France at Stade de France
619	Tobie Botes	(fly-half)	2012-02-04	v France at Stade de France
620	Luca Morisi	(centre)	2012-02-11	v England at Rome
621	Alberto De Marchi	prop	2012-06-09	v Argentina at San Juan
622	Davide Giazzon	(hooker)	2012-06-09	v Argentina at San Juan
623	Lorenzo Romano	(prop)	2012-06-09	v Argentina at San Juan
624	Alberto Benettin	fullback	2015-06-15	v Canada at Toronto
625	Andrea Pratichetti	centre	2015-06-15	v Canada at Toronto
626	Marco Fuser	(lock)	2015-06-15	v Canada at Toronto
627	Tommaso Iannone	winger	2012-11-10	v Tonga at Brescia
628	Francesco Minto	lock	2012-11-17	v New Zealand at Rome
629	Alberto Di Bernardo	fly-half	2013-06-08	v South Africa at Durban
630	Andrea Manici	(hooker)	2013-06-15	v Samoa at Nelspruit
631	Leandro Cedaro	lock	2013-06-22	v Scotland at Pretoria
632	Leonardo Sarto	winger	2013-06-22	v Scotland at Pretoria
633	Alberto Chillon	(scrum-half)	2013-06-22	v Scotland at Pretoria
634	Tommaso Allan	(fly-half)	2013-11-09	v Australia at Torino
635	Michele Campagnaro	(centre)	2013-11-16	v Fiji at Cremona
636	Angelo Esposito	winger	2014-02-01	v Wales at Millennium Stadium
637	George Biagi	(flanker)	2014-03-15	v England at Rome
638	Guglielmo Palazzani	scrum-half	2014-06-07	v Fiji at Suva
639	Andrea De Marchi	(prop)	2014-06-07	v Fiji at Suva
640	Dario Chistolini	(prop)	2014-06-14	v Samoa at Apia
641	Kelly Haimona	fly-half	2014-11-08	v Samia at Ascoli Piceno
642	Samuela Vunisa	flanker	2014-11-22	v South Africa at Padova
643	Marco Barbini	(flanker)	2015-02-07	v Ireland at Rome
644	Giulio Bisegni	(winger)	2015-02-14	v England at Twickenham
645	Enrico Bacchin	centre	2015-02-28	v Scotland at Murrayfield
646	Michele Visentin	winger	2015-02-28	v Scotland at Murrayfield
647	Carlo Canna	(centre)	2015-08-22	v Scotland at Torino
648	Marcello Violi	(scrum-half)	2015-08-22	v Scotland at Torino
649	Mattia Bellini	winger	2016-02-06	v France at Stade de France
650	Ornel Gega	hooker	2016-02-06	v France at Stade de France
651	Andrea Lovotti	prop	2016-02-06	v France at Stade de France
652	David Odiete	fullback	2016-02-06	v France at Stade de France
653	Dries van Schalkwyk	(flanker)	2016-02-06	v France at Stade de France
654	Matteo Zanusso	(prop)	2016-02-06	v France at Stade de France
655	Edoardo Padovani	(fly-half)	2016-02-14	v England at Rome
656	Braam Steyn	(flanker)	2016-02-14	v England at Rome
657	Pietro Ceccarelli	(prop)	2016-03-12	v Ireland at Dublin
658	Oliviero Fabiani	(hooker)	2016-03-12	v Ireland at Dublin
659	Alberto Lucchese	(scrum-half)	2016-03-12	v Ireland at Dublin
660	Jacopo Sarto	(lock)	2016-03-19	v Wales at Millennium Stadium
661	Tommaso Castello	centre	2016-06-11	v Argentina at Santa Fé
662	Sami Panico	(prop)	2016-06-11	v Argentina at Santa Fé
663	Maxime Mbanda	flanker	2016-06-18	v USA at San José
664	Sebastian Negri	(flanker)	2016-06-18	v USA at San José
665	Tommaso Boni	centre	2016-06-26	v Canada at Toronto
666	Giorgio Bronzini	scrum-half	2016-11-12	v New Zealand at Rome
667	Simone Ferrari	(prop)	2016-11-19	v South Africa at Firenze
668	Nicola Quaglio	(prop)	2016-11-19	v South Africa at Firenze
669	Luca Sperandio	(fullback)	2017-03-11	v France at Rome
670	Federico Ruzza	(lock)	2017-03-18	v Scotland at Murrayfield
671	Luca Bigi	hooker	2017-06-10	v Scotland at Singapore
672	Dean Budd	lock	2017-06-10	v Scotland at Singapore
673	Federico Zani	(prop)	2017-06-10	v Scotland at Singapore
674	Tiziano Pasquali	(prop)	2017-06-17	v Fiji at Suva
675	Marco Lazzaroni	flanker	2017-06-17	v Australia at Brisbane
676	Jayden Hayward	fullback	2017-11-11	v Fiji at Catania
677	Giovanni Licata	(flanker)	2017-11-11	v Fiji at Catania
678	Ian McKinley	(fly-half)	2017-11-11	v Fiji at Catania
679	Matteo Minozzi	(centre)	2017-11-11	v Fiji at Catania
680	Renato Giammarioli	(flanker)	2017-11-25	v South Africa at Padova
681	Jake Polledri	flanker	2018-03-07	v Scotland at Rome
682	Giosuè Zilocchi	(prop)	2018-06-09	v Japan at Oita
683	Cherif Traorè	(prop)	2018-06-16	v Japan at Kobe
684	Johan Meyer	flanker	2018-11-03	v Ireland at Chicago
685	Jimmy Tuivaiti	(no. 8)	2018-11-03	v Ireland at Chicago
686	Dave Sisi	lock	2019-02-02	v Scotland at Edinburgh
687	Marco Zanon	centre	2019-03-16	v France at Rome
688	Marco Riccioni	prop	2019-08-10	v Ireland at Dublin
689	Callum Braley	(scrum-half)	2019-08-10	v Ireland at Dublin
690	Niccolò Cannone	lock	2020-02-01	v Wales at Cardiff
691	Danilo Fischetti	(prop)	2020-02-01	v Wales at Cardiff
692	Paolo Garbisi	fly-half	2020-10-24	v Ireland at Dublin
693	Gianmarco Lucchesi	(hooker)	2020-10-24	v Ireland at Dublin
694	Federico Mori	(centre)	2020-10-24	v Ireland at Dublin
695	Jacopo Trulla	winger	2020-11-14	v Scotland at Florence
696	Stephen Varney	(scrum-half)	2020-11-14	v Scotland at Florence
697	Michele Lamaro	(flanker)	2020-11-28	v France at Paris
698	Cristian Stoian	(lock)	2020-11-28	v France at Paris
699	Monty Ioane	winger	2020-12-05	v Wales at Llanelli
700	Ignacio Brex	centre	2021-02-06	v France at Rome
701	Daniele Rimpelli	prop	2021-02-06	v France at Rome
702	Riccardo Favretto	(lock)	2021-03-20	v Scotland at Edinburgh
703	Ivan Nemer	(prop)	2021-11-06	v New Zealand at Rome
704	Giovanni Pettinelli	(flanker)	2021-11-13	v Argentina at Treviso
705	Alessandro Fusco	(scrum-half)	2021-11-13	v Argentina at Treviso
706	Pierre Bruno	winger	2021-11-20	v Uruguay at Parma
707	Hame Faiva	(hooker)	2021-11-20	v Uruguay at Parma
708	Iliesa Ratuva	(winger)	2021-11-20	v Uruguay at Parma
709	Tommaso Menoncello	winger	2022-02-06	v France at Paris
710	Toa Halafihi	no. 8	2022-02-06	v France at Paris
711	Manuel Zuliani	(flanker)	2022-02-06	v France at Paris
712	Leonardo Marin	(centre)	2022-02-06	v France at Paris
713	Andrea Zambonin	(lock)	2022-02-13	v England at Rome
714	Giacomo Nicotera	hooker	2022-03-12	v Scotland at Rome
715	Ange Capuozzo	(winger)	2022-03-12	v Scotland at Rome
716	Filippo Alongi	(prop)	2022-03-19	v Wales at Cardiff
717	Giacomo Da Re	fly-half	2022-06-25	v Portugal at Lisbon
718	Manfredi Albanese	(scrum-half)	2022-06-25	v Portugal at Lisbon
719	Ion Neculai	(prop)	2022-06-25	v Portugal at Lisbon
720	Alessandro Garbisi	scrum-half	2022-07-01	v Romania at Bucharest
721	Lorenzo Cannone	no. 8	2022-11-05	v Samoa at Padua
722	Enrico Lucchin	(centre)	2022-11-05	v Samoa at Padua
723	Edoardo Iachizzi	(lock)	2023-02-05	v France at Rome
724	Simone Gesi	winger	2023-03-18	v Scotland at Edinburgh
725	Marco Manfredi	(hooker)	2023-03-18	v Scotland at Edinburgh
726	Lorenzo Pani	fullback	2023-07-29	v Scotland at Edinburgh
727	Martin Page-Relo	scrum-half	2023-07-29	v Scotland at Edinburgh
728	Dino Lamb	lock	2023-08-05	v Ireland at Dublin
729	Paolo Odogwu	winger	2023-08-05	v Ireland at Dublin
730	Paolo Buonfiglio	(prop)	2023-08-05	v Ireland at Dublin
731	Mirco Spagnolo	(prop)	2024-02-03	v England at Rome
732	Alessandro Izekor	(flanker)	2024-02-03	v England at Rome
733	Ross Vintcent	(no. 8)	2024-02-11	v Ireland at Dublin
734	Louis Lynagh	winger	2024-03-09	v Scotland at Rome
735	Matt Gallagher	fullback	2024-07-05	v Samoa at Apia
736	Loris Zarantonello	(hooker)	2024-07-05	v Samoa at Apia
737	Giulio Bertaccini	(centre)	2024-11-24	v Georgia at Genoa
738	Luca Rizzoli	(prop)	2025-02-01	v Scotland at Edinburgh
739	Muhamed Hasa	(prop)	2025-06-27	v Namibia at Windhoek
740	Tommaso Di Bartolomeo	(hooker)	2025-06-27	v Namibia at Windhoek
741	Mirko Belloni	(winger)	2025-06-27	v Namibia at Windhoek
742	David Odiase	(flanker)	2025-07-05	v South Africa at Pretoria
743	Pablo Dimcheff	(hooker)	2025-07-05	v South Africa at Pretoria
744	Matteo Canali	(lock)	2025-07-05	v South Africa at Pretoria
745	Edoardo Todaro	(winger)	2025-11-22	v Chile at Genoa
746	Enoch Opoku-Gyamfi	(lock)	2025-11-22	v Chile at Genoa
747	Malik Faissal	wing	2026-07-04	v Japan at Tokyo
748	Alessandro Ortombina	flanker	2026-07-04	v Japan at Tokyo
749	Giulio Marini	(lock)	2026-07-11	v New Zealand at Wellington
750	Samuele Locatelli	flanker	2026-11-07	v South Africa at Turin
