= Mario Dotti =

Italy international rugby union player

- Full name: Mario Dotti

Rugby union career
- Position: Wing
Senior career
Years	Team	Apps	(Points)
- R.S. Ginnastica Torino
International career
Years	Team	Apps	(Points)
1939-40	Italy	3	

Mario Dotti IV is an Italian former rugby union footballer who played in the 1930s, and 1940s. He played at representative level for Italy, and at club level for R.S. Ginnastica Torino, as a wing.

== Playing career ==
=== International honours ===
Mario Dotti IV played Wing for Italy in the 3–0 victory over Romania at Campo Testaccio, Rome on Saturday 29 April 1939, the 0–3 defeat to Romania at Dinamo Stadion, Bucharest on Sunday 14 April 1940, and the 4–0 victory over Germany in Stuttgart on Sunday 5 May 1940.

=== Club career ===
Mario Dotti IV was a member of the R.S. Ginnastica Torino team that won the 1947 Campionati italiani. In honour of this, Dotti's name appears alongside his teammates on a plaque affixed to Motovelodromo Fausto Coppi in Turin, the squad was; Ausonio Alacevich, Guido Aleati, Sergio Aleati, Roberto Antonioli, Angelo Arrigoni, Vincenzo Bertolotto, Bianco, Giovanni Bonino, Campi, Gabriele Casalegno, Chiosso, Chiosso, Guido Cornarino, Mario Dotti IV, Aldo Guglielminotti, Pescarmona, Piovano, Rocca, Felice Rama (coach), Siliquini, Giovanni Tamagno, and Sandro Vigliano.

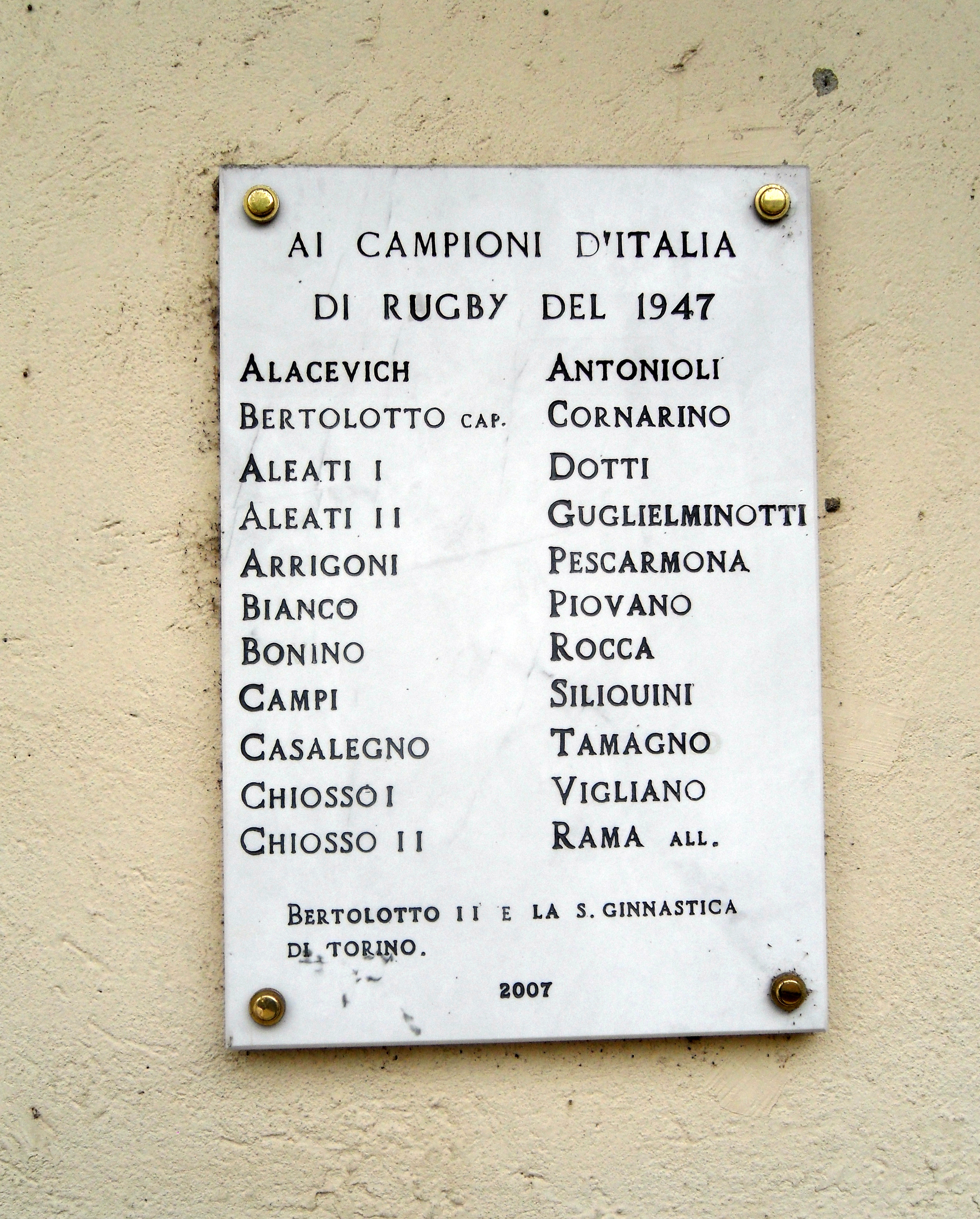
Commemorative plaque in honour of the Italian champions 1947.
