= Sandro Vigliano =

Italy international rugby union player

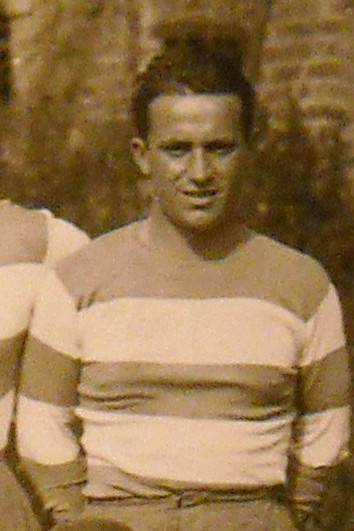
- Full name: Sandro Vigliano

Rugby union career
- Position: Flanker
Senior career
Years	Team	Apps	(Points)
–	CUS Torino Rugby		
–	R.S. Ginnastica Torino		
International career
Years	Team	Apps	(Points)
1937-42	Italy	6	(30)

Sandro Vigliano is an Italian former rugby union footballer who played in the 1930s, and 1940s. He played at representative level for Italy (Captain), and at club level for CUS Torino Rugby, and R.S. Ginnastica Torino, as a Flanker.

== Playing career ==
=== International honours ===
Sandro Vigliano represented Italy in 1937 against Romania, in the 1937 FIRA Tournament (Captain) against Belgium, Germany, and France, in 1939 against Romania, and in 1942 against Romania.

=== Club career ===
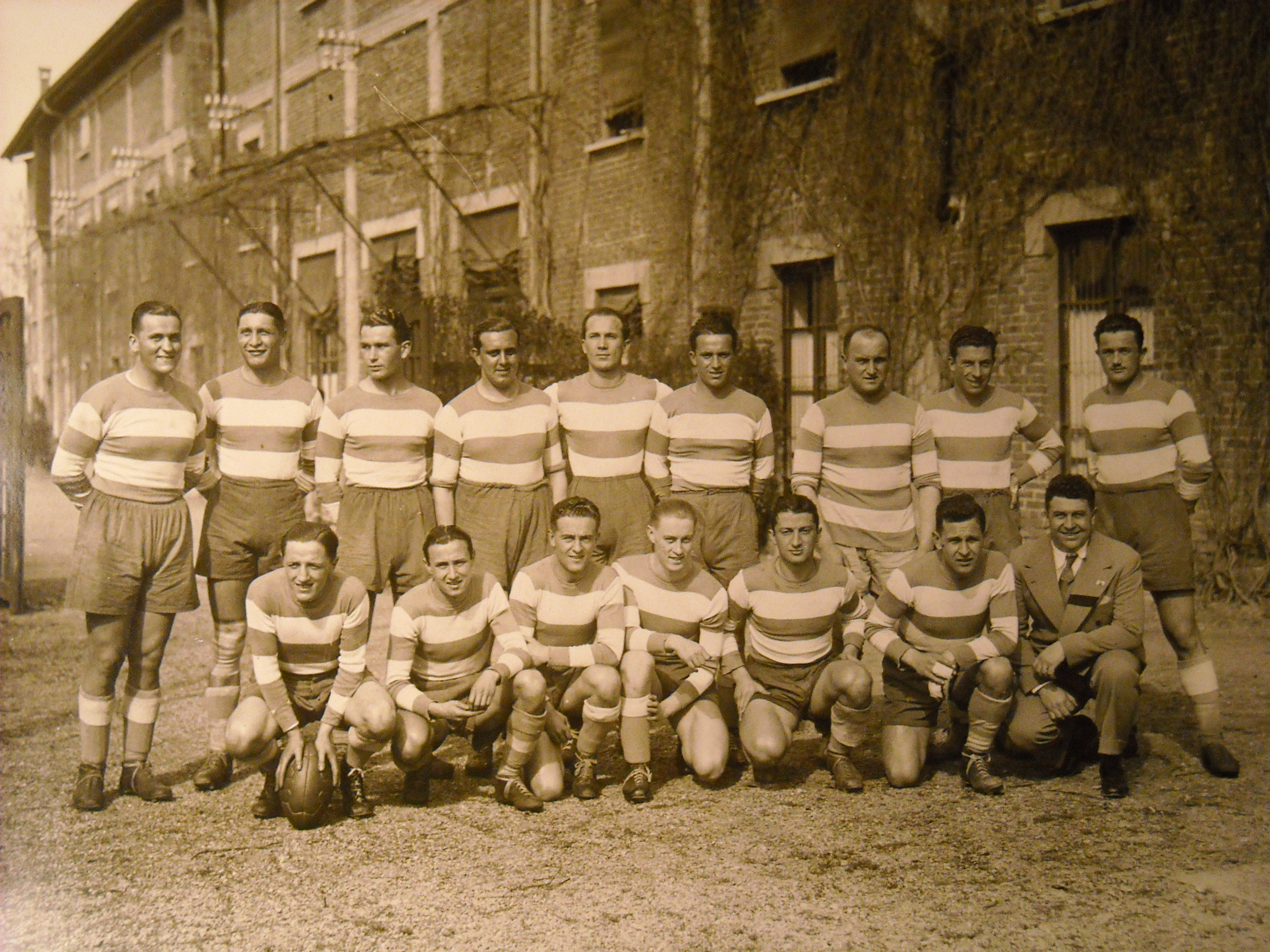
Sandro Vigliano CUS Torino Rugby 1936 is standing 4th from the right.

Sandro Vigliano was a member of the CUS Torino Rugby team that won the 1936, and 1941 Campionati italiani, and was also a member of the R.S. Ginnastica Torino team that won the 1947 Campionati italiani. In honour of this, Vigliano's name appears alongside his teammates on a plaque affixed to Motovelodromo Fausto Coppi in Turin, the squad was; Ausonio Alacevich, Guido Aleati, Sergio Aleati, Roberto Antonioli, Angelo Arrigoni, Vincenzo Bertolotto, Bianco, Giovanni Bonino, Campi, Gabriele Casalegno, Chiosso, Chiosso, Guido Cornarino, Mario Dotti IV, Aldo Guglielminotti, Pescarmona, Piovano, Rocca, Felice Rama (coach), Siliquini, Giovanni Tamagno, and Sandro Vigliano.

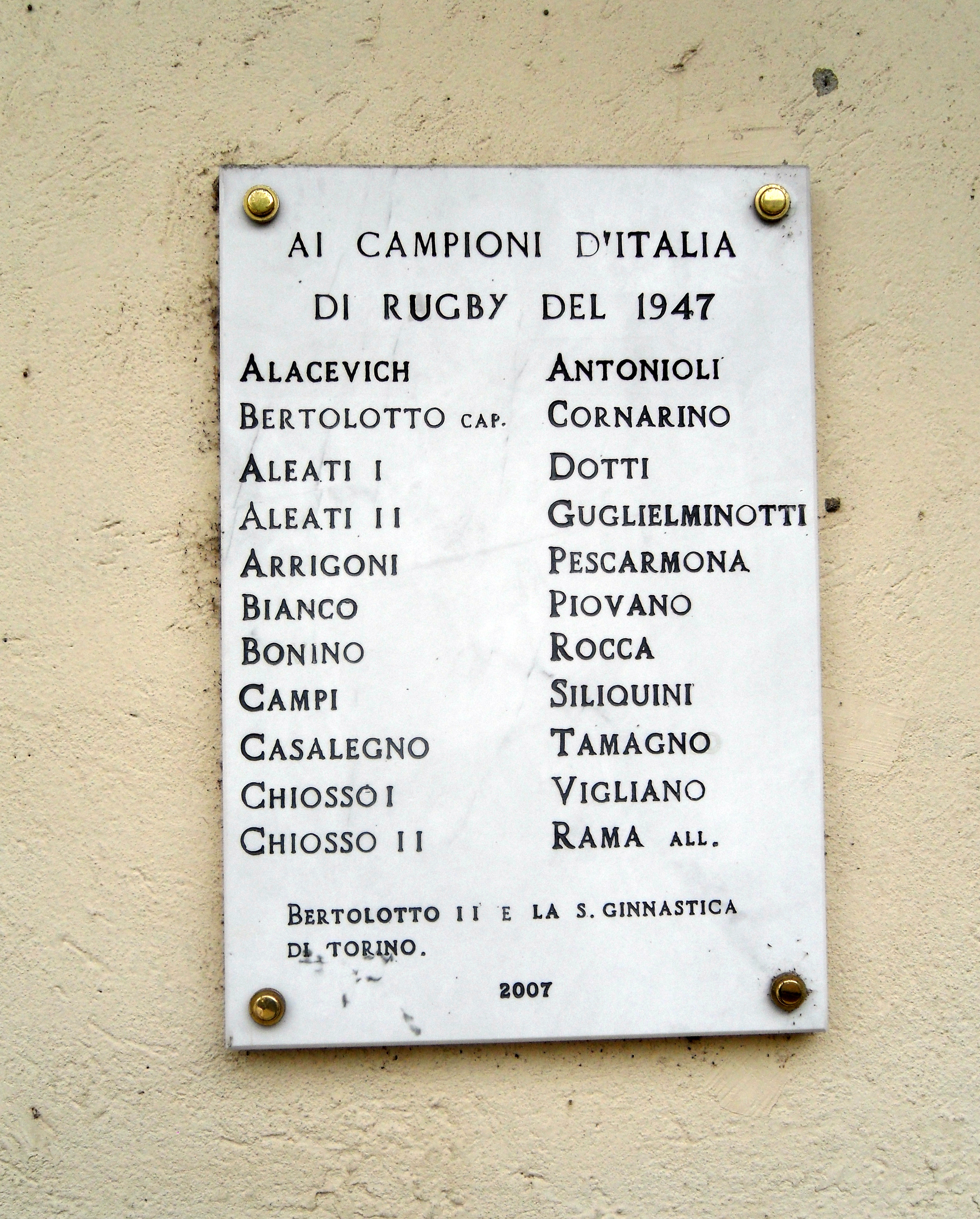
Commemorative plaque in honour of the Italian champions 1947.
