= Ausonio Alacevich =

Italy international rugby union player

- Full name: Ausonio Alacevich
- Born: 13 February 1910 Zadar, Austria-Hungary
- Died: 2001

Rugby union career
- Position: Prop
Senior career
Years	Team	Apps	(Points)
- R.S. Ginnastica Torino
International career
Years	Team	Apps	(Points)
1939	Italy		

Ausonio Alacevich (born 13 February 1910 – 2001) was a rugby union footballer who played in the 1930s, and 1940s. He played at representative level for Italy, and at club level for R.S. Ginnastica Torino, as a Prop. He was born in Zadar, Austria-Hungary.

== Playing career ==
=== International honours ===
Alacevich was a substitute for Italy in the 3–0 victory over Romania at Campo Testaccio, Rome on Saturday 29 April 1939.

=== Club career ===
Alacevich was a member of the R.S. Ginnastica Torino team that won the 1947 Campionati italiani. In honour of this, Alacevich's name appears alongside his teammates on a plaque affixed to Motovelodromo Fausto Coppi in Turin, the squad was; Ausonio Alacevich, Guido Aleati, Sergio Aleati, Roberto Antonioli, Angelo Arrigoni, Vincenzo Bertolotto, Bianco, Giovanni Bonino, Campi, Gabriele Casalegno, Chiosso, Chiosso, Guido Cornarino, Mario Dotti IV, Aldo Guglielminotti, Pescarmona, Piovano, Rocca, Felice Rama, Siliquini, Giovanni Tamagno, and Sandro Vigliano.

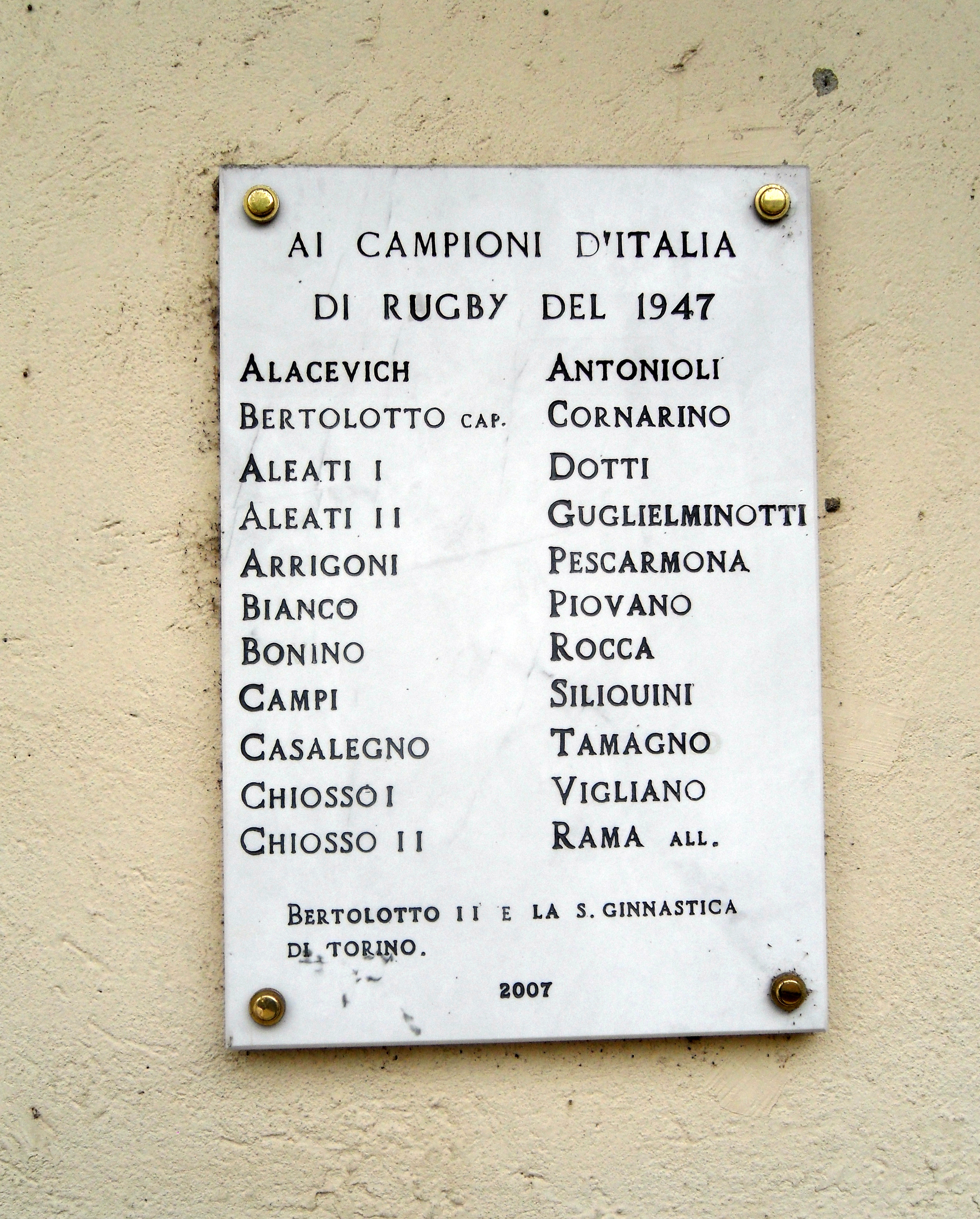
Commemorative plaque in honour of the Italian champions 1947.
