= Luigi Bosia =

Former Italy international rugby league footballer

Personal information
- Full name: Luigi Bosia
- Born: c. 1926

Playing information
- Height: 5 ft 9 in (175 cm)
- Weight: 11 st 9 lb (74 kg)
- Position: Wing
Club
Years	Team	Pld	T	G	FG	P
1950–≥50	Torino XIII
Representative
Years	Team	Pld	T	G	FG	P
1950–≥50	Italy

Luigi Bosia (born c. 1926) is an Italian professional rugby league footballer who played in the 1950s. He played at representative level for Italy, and at club level for Torino XIII, as a wing.

== Playing career ==
=== International honours ===
Vincenzo Bertolotto co-organised (with Dennis Chappell , from Wakefield, and a Turin resident), and captained the Italy (RL) tour of 1950 to France (3 matches), England (including; 28–49 defeat by Wigan at Central Park, Wigan on Saturday 26 August 1950, Huddersfield at Fartown Ground, Huddersfield on Wednesday 6 September 1950, St. Helens at Knowsley Road on Thursday 16 November 1950), and Wales (including; 11–29 defeat by South Wales XIII at Brewery Field, Bridgend on Saturday 2 September 1950).

The Italy (RL) squad was; Guido Aleati (previously of R.S. Ginnastica Torino (RU)), Sergio Aleati (previously of R.S. Ginnastica Torino (RU)), Roberto Antonioli (previously of R.S. Ginnastica Torino (RU)), Angelo Arrigoni (previously of R.S. Ginnastica Torino (RU)), Vincenzo Bertolotto (previously of R.S. Ginnastica Torino (RU)), Michele Bietto, Giovanni Bonino (previously of R.S. Ginnastica Torino (RU)), Luigi Bosia, Giuseppe Cannone, Pasquale Cannone, Delio Caron, Gabriele Casalegno (previously of R.S. Ginnastica Torino (RU)), Amerio Chiara, Giorgio Cornacchia, Guido Cornarino (previously of R.S. Ginnastica Torino (RU)), Fabrizio Faglioli, Enzo Francesconi, Giuseppe Franco, Aldo Guglielminotti (previously of R.S. Ginnastica Torino (RU)), Giovanni Orecchia, Luigi Pignattaro, Franco Pipino, Giorgio Rassaval, Giorgio Rubino, Giovanni Tamagno (previously of R.S. Ginnastica Torino (RU)), Oreste Tescari and Giovanni Vigna.

=== Club career ===
Following the Italy (RL) tour of 1950 to France, England, and Wales, a Torino XIII featuring Luigi Bosia joined the French league.
