= Angelo Arrigoni =

Personal information
- Full name: Angelo Arrigoni
- Born: 16 February 1923
- Died: 27 September 2014 (aged 91); Turin, Italy

Playing information
- Height: 5 ft 10 in (178 cm)
- Weight: 11 st 8 lb (73 kg)

Rugby union
- Position: Wing
Club
Years	Team	Pld	T	G	FG	P
1947–50	R.S. Ginnastica Torino
Representative
Years	Team	Pld	T	G	FG	P
1949	Italy	1

Rugby league
- Position: Wing, Centre
Club
Years	Team	Pld	T	G	FG	P
1950–≥50	Torino XIII
Representative
Years	Team	Pld	T	G	FG	P
1950–≥50	Italy

Angelo Arrigoni (16 February 1923 – 27 September 2014) was an Italian rugby union and professional rugby league footballer who played in the 1940s and 1950s. He played representative level rugby union (RU) for Italy, and at club level for R.S. Ginnastica Torino, as a wing and representative level rugby league (RL) for Italy, and at club level for Torino XIII, as a wing, or centre.

== Playing career ==
=== International honours ===
==== Rugby union ====
Arrigoni represented Italy (RU) in the 6-14 defeat by Czechoslovakia at Strahov Stadium, Prague on Sunday 22 May 1949.

==== Rugby league ====
Vincenzo Bertolotto co-organised (with Dennis Chappell , from Wakefield, and a Turin resident), and captained the Italy (RL) tour of 1950 to France (3 matches), England (including; 28-49 defeat by Wigan at Central Park, Wigan on Saturday 26 August 1950, Huddersfield at Fartown Ground, Huddersfield on Wednesday 6 September 1950, St. Helens at Knowsley Road on Thursday 16 November 1950), and Wales (including; 11-29 defeat by South Wales XIII at Brewery Field, Bridgend on Saturday 2 September 1950).

The Italy (RL) squad was; Guido Aleati (previously of R.S. Ginnastica Torino (RU)), Sergio Aleati (previously of R.S. Ginnastica Torino (RU)), Roberto Antonioli (previously of R.S. Ginnastica Torino (RU)), Angelo Arrigoni (previously of R.S. Ginnastica Torino (RU)), Vincenzo Bertolotto (previously of R.S. Ginnastica Torino (RU)), Michele Bietto, Giovanni Bonino (previously of R.S. Ginnastica Torino (RU)), Luigi Bosia, Giuseppe Cannone, Pasquale Cannone, Delio Caron, Gabriele Casalegno (previously of R.S. Ginnastica Torino (RU)), Amerio Chiara, Giorgio Cornacchia, Guido Cornarino (previously of R.S. Ginnastica Torino (RU)), Fabrizio Faglioli, Enzo Francesconi, Giuseppe Franco, Aldo Guglielminotti (previously of R.S. Ginnastica Torino (RU)), Giovanni Orecchia, Luigi Pignattaro, Franco Pipino, Giorgio Rassaval, Giorgio Rubino, Giovanni Tamagno (previously of R.S. Ginnastica Torino (RU)), Oreste Tescari and Giovanni Vigna.

=== Club career ===
==== Rugby union ====
Arrigoni was a member of the R.S. Ginnastica Torino (RU) team that won the 1947 Campionati italiani. In honour of this, Arrigoni's name appears alongside his teammates on a plaque affixed to Motovelodromo Fausto Coppi in Turin, the squad was; eight players that would subsequently accompany Arrigoni on the 1950 rugby league tour, and also Ausonio Alacevich, Bianco, Campi, Chiosso, Chiosso, Mario Dotti IV, Pescarmona, Piovano, Rocca, Felice Rama (coach), Siliquini, and Sandro Vigliano.

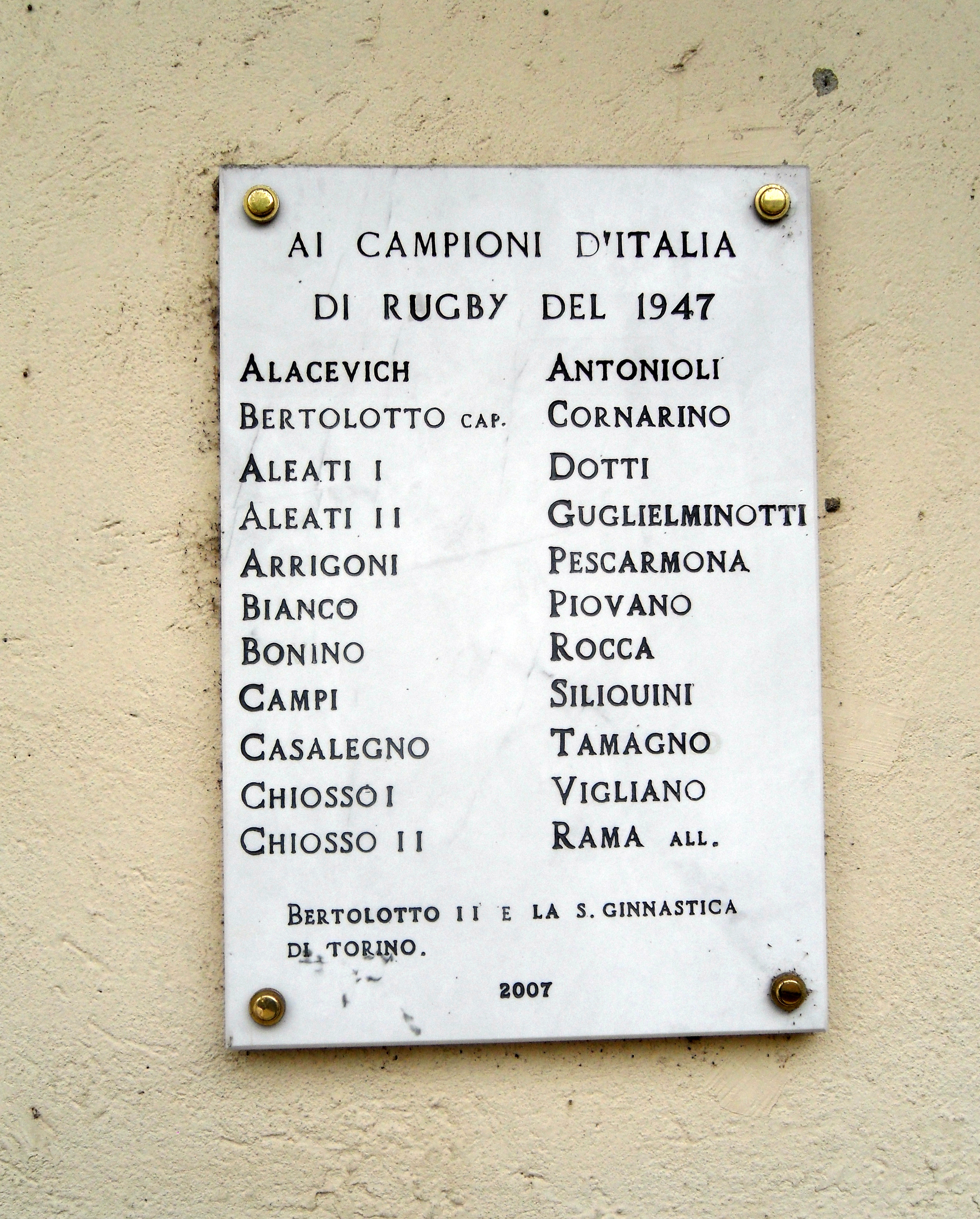
Commemorative plaque in honour of the Italian champions 1947.

==== Rugby league ====
Following the Italy (RL) tour of 1950 to France, England, and Wales, a Torino XIII featuring Angelo Arrigoni joined the French league.
