= Giovanni Vigna =

Former Italy international rugby league footballer

Personal information
- Full name: Giovanni Vigna
- Born: c. 1925

Playing information
- Height: 6 ft 1 in (1.85 m)
- Weight: 12 st 12 lb (82 kg)
- Position: Second-row
Club
Years	Team	Pld	T	G	FG	P
1950–≥50	Torino XIII
Representative
Years	Team	Pld	T	G	FG	P
1950–≥60	Italy
1954	Combined Nationalities	1	1	0	0	3

Giovanni Vigna (born c. 1925) is an Italian former professional rugby league footballer who played in the 1950s and 1960s. He played at representative level for Italy and Combined Nationalities, and at club level for Torino XIII, as a second-row.

== Playing career ==
=== Italy ===
Vincenzo Bertolotto co-organised (with Dennis Chappell , from Wakefield, and a Turin resident), and captained the Italy (RL) tour of 1950 to France (3 matches), England (including; 28-49 defeat by Wigan at Central Park, Wigan on Saturday 26 August 1950, Huddersfield at Fartown Ground, Huddersfield on Wednesday 6 September 1950, St. Helens at Knowsley Road on Thursday 16 November 1950), and Wales (including; 11-29 defeat by South Wales XIII at Brewery Field, Bridgend on Saturday 2 September 1950).

The Italy (RL) squad was;

- Guido Aleati (previously of R.S. Ginnastica Torino (RU)),
- Sergio Aleati (previously of R.S. Ginnastica Torino (RU)),
- Roberto Antonioli (previously of R.S. Ginnastica Torino (RU)),
- Angelo Arrigoni (previously of R.S. Ginnastica Torino (RU)),
- Vincenzo Bertolotto (previously of R.S. Ginnastica Torino (RU)),
- Michele Bietto,
- Giovanni Bonino (previously of R.S. Ginnastica Torino (RU)),
- Luigi Bosia,
- Giuseppe Cannone,
- Pasquale Cannone,
- Delio Caron,
- Gabriele Casalegno (previously of R.S. Ginnastica Torino (RU)),
- Amerio Chiara,
- Giorgio Cornacchia,
- Guido Cornarino (previously of R.S. Ginnastica Torino (RU)),
- Fabrizio Faglioli,
- Enzo Francesconi,
- Giuseppe Franco,
- Aldo Guglielminotti (previously of R.S. Ginnastica Torino (RU)),
- Giovanni Orecchia,
- Luigi Pignattaro,
- Franco Pipino,
- Giorgio Rassaval,
- Giorgio Rubino,
- Giovanni Tamagno (previously of R.S. Ginnastica Torino (RU)),
- Oreste Tescari,
- Giovanni Vigna.

Italy (RL) toured again in 1954, they were known as Federazione Amatori Italiani – Gioco di XIII (Federation of Italian Amateurs - Game of thirteen) because they were prevented from using the term "rugby" by the Federazione Italiana Rugby (Italian Rugby (Union) Federation), the squad included; Baldassin (Second-row for Carpentras XIII who attempted goals without a run up), Vincenzo Bertolotto, Giovanni Vigna, the squad arrived in Leeds on Tuesday 6 April 1954, to play six games in fifteen days, Giovanni Vigna scored three tries, and Baldassin scored three goals from eleven attempts in the initial 18-67 defeat by Bradford Northern at Odsal Stadium, Bradford in front of a crowd of 7,000 under Floodlights in the evening on Wednesday 7 April 1954, the Bradford Northern team was; Joe Phillips, D Knorpf, Joseph Mageen, E. Jenkins, W. Seddon, Jack McLean, Leonard Haley, P. Goddard, G. Jones, N. Carter, N. Haley, W. Jones, Trevor Foster, A. Story, Brian Radford, Ken Traill, the initial match was originally scheduled to be an amateur international at Odsal Stadium, Bradford, this was rescheduled to later in the tour at Central Park, Wigan, and Bradford Northern agreed to play despite only having played Halifax on Monday 5 April 1954.

Giovanni Vigna played at second-row in Italy's 15-37 defeat by Australia in the 1959–60 Kangaroo tour match at Stadio Euganeo, Padua on Saturday 23 January 1960.

=== Combined Nationalities ===
Giovanni Vigna played at second-row and scored a try in Combined Nationalities' 15-19 defeat by France at Stade de Gerland, Lyon on Sunday 3 January 1954.

=== Club career ===
Following the Italy (RL) tour of 1950 to France, England, and Wales, a Torino XIII featuring Giovanni Vigna joined the French league.

== Sources ==
- Benedetto Pasqua; Mirio Da Roit, Cent'anni di rugby a Torino (One Hundred Years of Rugby in Turin), Torino, Ananke [2011].
- Francesco Volpe; Paolo Pacetti, Rugby 2012, Roma, Zesi [2011].
- Gianluca Barca; Gian Franco Bellè, La Sesta Nazione (The Sixth Nation), Parma, Grafiche Step [2008].
