= 1936 FIRA Tournament =

European rugby union championship

- Date: 14–17 May 1936
- Countries: France; Germany; Italy; Romania

Tournament statistics
- Champions: France
- Matches played: 4

A rugby union tournament was held in May 1936, three months prior to the 1936 Summer Olympics in Berlin. Rugby union had been an official Olympic sport in 1900, 1908, 1920 and 1924, but was dropped from the Olympic program after the 1924 Paris Games. The 1936 tournament is not mentioned in the official report of the organising committee of the Berlin Games, and has never been given the status of an official demonstration sport for those Games.

Four teams competed in the 1936 tournament, which was considered one of the "best organized and most international rugby tournaments to date". France defeated Germany in the final.

Semi-finals
14 May
France	25
Romania	5
Germany	19
Italy	8

Final
17 May
France	19
Germany	14
Third place
Italy	8
Romania	7

== Teams ==
=== French players ===
Forwards : Francis Daguerre (Biarritz Olympique), André Goyard (Lyon OU), André Rochon (AS Montferrand), Étienne Ithurra (Biarritz Olympique), Marcel Laurent (FC Auch), François Raynal (USA Perpignan), Louis Dupont (Racing club de France), Lucien Cognet (AS Montferrand).

Backs : Pierre Thiers (AS Montferrand), Georges Libaros (Stadoceste Tarbais), Maurice Celhay (Aviron Bayonnais), Joseph Desclaux (c) (USA Perpignan), Jean Coderc (Racing club chalonnais), Pierre Geschwind (Racing club de France), Maurice Savy (AS Montferrand).

Substitutes : René Lombarteix (AS Montferrand), Prud'homme (Lyon olympique universitaire), René Arotça (Aviron Bayonnais), Jacques Dorot (Racing club de France), Jean Blond (Stade Français), Jean Fau (Union sportive carcassonnaise XV), Firmin Raynaud (Union sportive carcassonnaise XV), Frantz-Maurice Sahuc (Stade Toulousain), Michel Capendeguy (Saint-Jean-de-Luz olympique rugby).

Managers : René Crabos, Jean Semmartin and Joseph Lanusse.

=== German players ===
Forwards : M. Schroers (DRC Hannover), K. Metzger (SC Frankfurt 1880), E. Derleth (Frankfurt TV 60), Erwin Thiesies (Tennis Borussia Berlin), H. Kocher (RG Heidelberg), A. Koch (SV Odin Hannover), W. Pfisterer (RG Heidelberg), O. Oppermann (FV 1897 Linden).

Backs : K. Loos (Heidelberger RK), H. Hanning (Rasenspiele Hannover), K. Hübsch (Heidelberger RK), H. Schwanenberg (c) (DSV 78 Hannover), W. Zichlinski (FV 1897 Linden), W. Dünnhaupt (SV Odin Hannover), G. Isenberg (DSV 78 Hannover).

Substitutes : A. Aue, W. Roth, F. Bukowski.

Manager : ?.

=== Italian players ===
Forwards : Tommaso Fattori (Rugby Roma Olimpic), S. Bonfante (CUS Torino Rugby), G. Zoffoli (Rugby Roma Olimpic), A. Albonico (CUS Torino Rugby), Vincenzo Bertolotto (CUS Torino Rugby), G. Visentin (Amatori Rugby Milano), I. Aloisio (Amatori Rugby Milan), A. Re-Garbagnati (Amatori Rugby Milano).

Backs : M. Campagna (c) (Amatori Rugby Milan), G. Piana (CUS Torino Rugby), R. Maffioli (Amatori Rugby Milano), F. Vinci III (Rugby Roma Olimpic), G. Rizzoli (Rugby Bologna 1928), A. Cazzini (Amatori Rugby Milano), R. Centinari (Amatori Rugby Milano).

Substitutes : O. Maestri (Amatori Rugby Milano), E. Sgorbati (Amatori Rugby Milano), Vigliana (CUS Torino Rugby), Ardissone (CUS Torino Rugby), Pinardi (CUS Torino Rugby).

Manager : Michel Boucheron.

=== Romanian players ===
Forwards : I. Tarabega, G. Fantaneanu, S. Ionescu, S. Barsan, S. Burlescu, G. Ionescu, E. Marculescu, C. Beju.

Backs : A. Marasescu, N. Crissoveloni (c), A. Damian, I. Popa, C. Grigorescu, I. Irimia, C. Dinescu.

Substitutes : A. Matescu, Nicolescu, Epure, Craciunescu, Tudor, E. Sfetescu, M. Slobozeanu, Anastasiade, Florea.

Manager : ?.
