= Diego Saccà =

- Born: 23 February 1981 (age 45) Livorno, Italy
- Height: 6 ft 1 in (185 cm)
- Weight: 187 lb (85 kg)

Rugby union career
- Position: Centre / Wing
International career
Years	Team	Apps	(Points)
2003	Italy	1	(0)

Diego Saccà (born 23 February 1981) is an Italian former international rugby union player.

Saccà was born in Livorno and is the son of sports administrator Nino Saccà, who was formerly vice-president of the Italian Rugby Federation. He is the elder brother of professional rugby player Andrea Saccà.

A powerful three-quarter, Saccà started his senior career with hometown club Rugby Livorno 1931. He later competed with Gran Parma, Viadana and Capitolina. In 2003, Saccà toured New Zealand with the national team for a series of matches against provincial sides, then earned his solitary cap in a World Cup warm-up match against Ireland in Limerick.

Saccà was head coach of Livorno from 2010 to 2015. Since then he has been involved in women's rugby, serving coaching roles with the Italian women's sevens, under-18 and under-20s national sides.

== See also ==
- List of Italy national rugby union players
