= CUS Torino Rugby =

Italian rugby union club, based in Turin

- Full name: CUS Torino Rugby
- Union: Italian Rugby Federation
- Founded: 1951; 74 years ago
- Location: Turin, Italy
- Ground(s): Centro sportivo Carlo Guglielmino (Capacity: 500)
- President: (Italy) Riccardo D’Elicio
- Coach(es): (Argentina) (Italy) Lucas D'Angelo
- League(s): Serie A
1st kit	2nd kit

Official website
- rugby.custorino.it

CUS Torino Rugby is an Italian rugby union club currently competing in the Serie A. They are based in Turin, in Piedmont. CUS Torino occupied the first places in the championship in the years 1934–1938 under the leadership of its French coach, Michel Boucheron, and the team captain, Vincenzo Bertolotto. The club lost the three finals played to date against Amatori Rugby Milano and Rugby Parma.

== History ==
Born in 1928 under the aegis of a fascist student union (the Gruppo Universitario Fascista), the GUF participated in its first championship in 1929–30. In November 1935, GUF Torino, with Bertolotto, Vigliano and Alacevich, all three internationals, beat a second team from AS Montferrand in Clermont-Ferrand with a score of 14 to 13. After the Second World War, CUS Torino Rugby was founded in 1951 on the ruins of the GUF, the rugby section of the Centro Universitario Sportivo Torinese Sports Club.

The Cus Torino returns to the highest level of Italian rugby by integrating the 2022–2023 championship and sees young people from the club being regularly called up to the national teams (G. Cavallaro [U19], A. Cagnotto [U18 women], Luna Agatha Sacchi [Women's U20], F. Imberti and R. Genovese). However, he was unable to maintain his position and returned to the second division.

== Honours ==
- Italian championship
  - Runners-up (3): 1935–36, 1940–41, 1956–57
- Coppa Italia
  - Runners-up (1): 1966–67

== Current squad ==
The CUS Torino for 2023–24 season is:

CUS Torino squad
**Props and hookers**: (Argentina) J. Barbotti; (Italy) A. Caputo; (Italy) L-T. Cataldi; (Italy) L. De Boni; (Italy) M. Liguori; (Italy) A. Lombardo; (Italy) E. Roncon; (Italy) J. Valleise; **Locks**: (Italy) D. Ciotoli; (Italy) F. Mastrodomenico; (Italy) G. Perrone; (Italy) G. Piacenza; (Italy) P. Spinelli; **Back row**: (Romania) A-B. Andreica; (Italy) A. Caminiti; (Italy) L. Di Fiore; (Italy) E. Riccardi; (Romania) S. Ursache	**Scrum-halves**: (Italy) M. Cruciani; (Italy) G. Malavasi; (Italy) G. Cavallaro; **Fly-halves**: (Italy) F. Bolognesi; (Italy) J. Perrone; (Italy) G. Reeves; (Italy) M. Solano; (Argentina) A. Torres; **Centres, wings and fullbacks**: (Italy) F. Bellazzo; (Italy) M. Canzani; (Italy) G-M. Cisi; (Italy) A. Civetta; (Romania) D-G. Groza; (Italy) F. Imberti; (Italy) M. Matteraglia; (Italy) E. Reeves; (Italy) E. Telloni; (Italy) L. Toniolo; (Italy) M. Zanatta
(c) denotes the team captain, **Bold** denotes internationally capped players.^{*} denotes players qualified to play for Italy on residency or dual nationality. Players and their allocated positions from the CUS Torino website.

== Selected former players ==
=== Italian players ===
Former players who have played for CUS Torino and have caps for Italy:

- Angelo Albonico (10)
- Ausonio Alacevich (1)
- Vincenzo Bertolotto (6)
- Sandro Bonfante (2)
- Adolfo Francese (2)
- (Italy) Natale Molari (2)
- Giuseppe Piana (6)
- (Italy) Walter Rista (5)
- Sandro Vigliano (6)

== Publications ==
- (in Italian) Benedetto Pasqua and Mirio Da Roit, Cent'anni di rugby a Torino, Turin, Ananke, May 2011, (ISBN 978-88-7325-375-4)
- (in Italian) Francesco Volpe and Paolo Pacetti, Rugby 2013 (Zesi, 2012).
- (in Italian) Francesco Volpe and Paolo Pacetti, Rugby 2022 (Zesi, 2021).
