= Michel Boucheron =

French rugby union player & coach

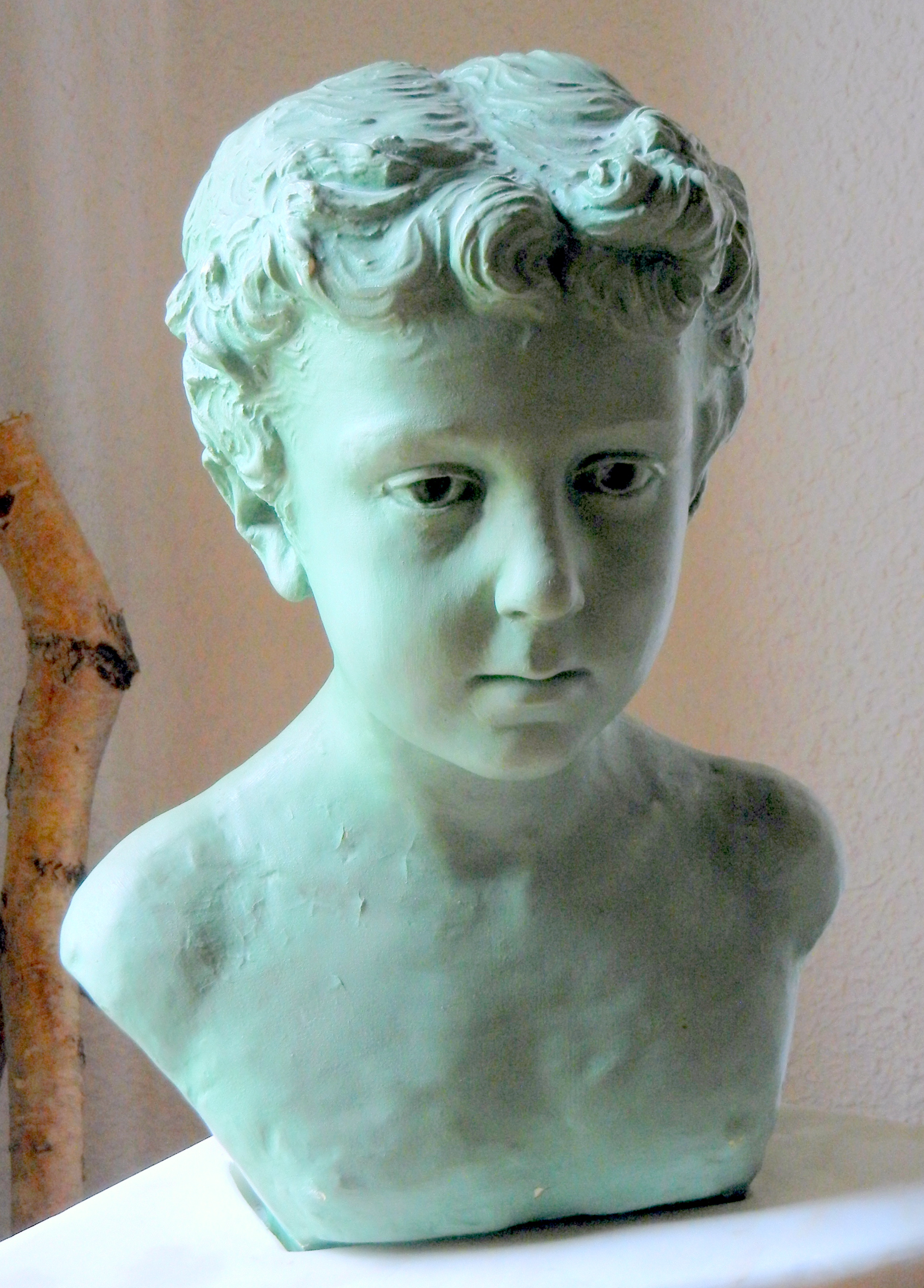
- Buste de Michel Boucheron à l'âge de 10 ans environ.JPG
- Born: 30 March 1903 Clermont-Ferrand, France
- Died: 31 May 1940 (aged 37) Dunkirk, France

Rugby union career
- Position: Scrum-half
Amateur team(s)
Years	Team	Apps	(Points)
1924–1931	ASM Clermont Auvergne		
Coaching career
- Years: Team
- 1934–1938: CUS Torino
- 1936: Italy

Michel Boucheron (30 March 1903 – 31 May 1940) was a French rugby union former player who also served as the head coach of the Italian national team.

== Playing career ==
He plays with AS Montferrand between 1924 and 1931 with Louis Puech, futur president of the Stade Toulousain and accesses the first division, the elite club Montferrand never left.

== Coaching career ==
After his playing career, he left work at the Michelin factory in Turin and it leads to the rugby team of the city, the CUS Torino, up 1938, and whose captain is Vincenzo Bertolotto, Italian international. He is appointed technical director in February 1934 the teams colors white and blue and with this responsibility that the French gave the CUS momentum that allows dynamic and modern rugby Turin to impose at national level, just behind the Amatori Rugby Milano. Coaches are French school in Italy at that time: Julien Saby in 1934 became technical adviser to the Italian national team. When, in 1936, Saby happening in the Amatori Milano, already able to attract the best Italians players, the Federation is almost forced to choose Michel Boucheron as coach given the work done in Turin. It participates in the 1936 FIRA Tournament in May in Berlin when Italy finished third. This is a brief interlude for the French. In 1937, Julien Saby takes the national team and Boucheron returns to Turin.

Michel Boucheron, known "Michu" during his visit to the ASM, is to helm the CUS to the end of 1938. "I leave the white and blue to return to France", said he after, as Bergoglio wrote in 1949, takes place in the Italian Chamber of Deputies scandal to the cry of "Tunis-Djibouti-Suez”: through the cheers that Italians MPs support the declaration in 1938 of the Minister of Foreign Affairs of the natural aspiration of Italy on these territories. After leaving Italy, he finds himself at Dunkirk with the 92nd Regiment of Marines where he embarked on the destroyer Sirocco. On this torpedo during Operation Dynamo, he was killed May 31, 1940, along with former players of the ASM. His name appears on a monument in memory of the fallen in the two World Wars and in the Stade Marcel-Michelin members of ASM Clermont Auvergne.

== Honours ==
=== As a player ===
- Champion of Honor (second level of domestic club rugby union) in France 1925

=== As a coach ===
- Finalist Serie A in 1936
- 3rd 1936 FIRA Tournament in Berlin in May 1936 with Italy

== Publications ==
- (in French) Christophe Buron and Yves Meunier, Les "Jaune et Bleu" de A à Z : L'ABCdaire de l'ASM Clermont Auvergne, Clermont-Ferrand, Editions Revoir, March 2010, (ISBN 978-2-35265-024-9)
- (in Italian) Benedetto Pasqua and Mirio Da Roit, Cent'anni di rugby a Torino, Turin, Ananke, May 2011, (ISBN 978-88-7325-375-4)
- (in Italian) Francesco Volpe and Paolo Pacetti, Rugby 2012, Roma, Zesi, October 2011

Sporting positions
Preceded by (France) Julien Saby	Italy National Rugby Union Coach; 1936	Succeeded by (France) Julien Saby
