= Campo Testaccio =

Multi-use stadium in Rome, Italy

Coordinates: 41.876615°N 12.478012°E

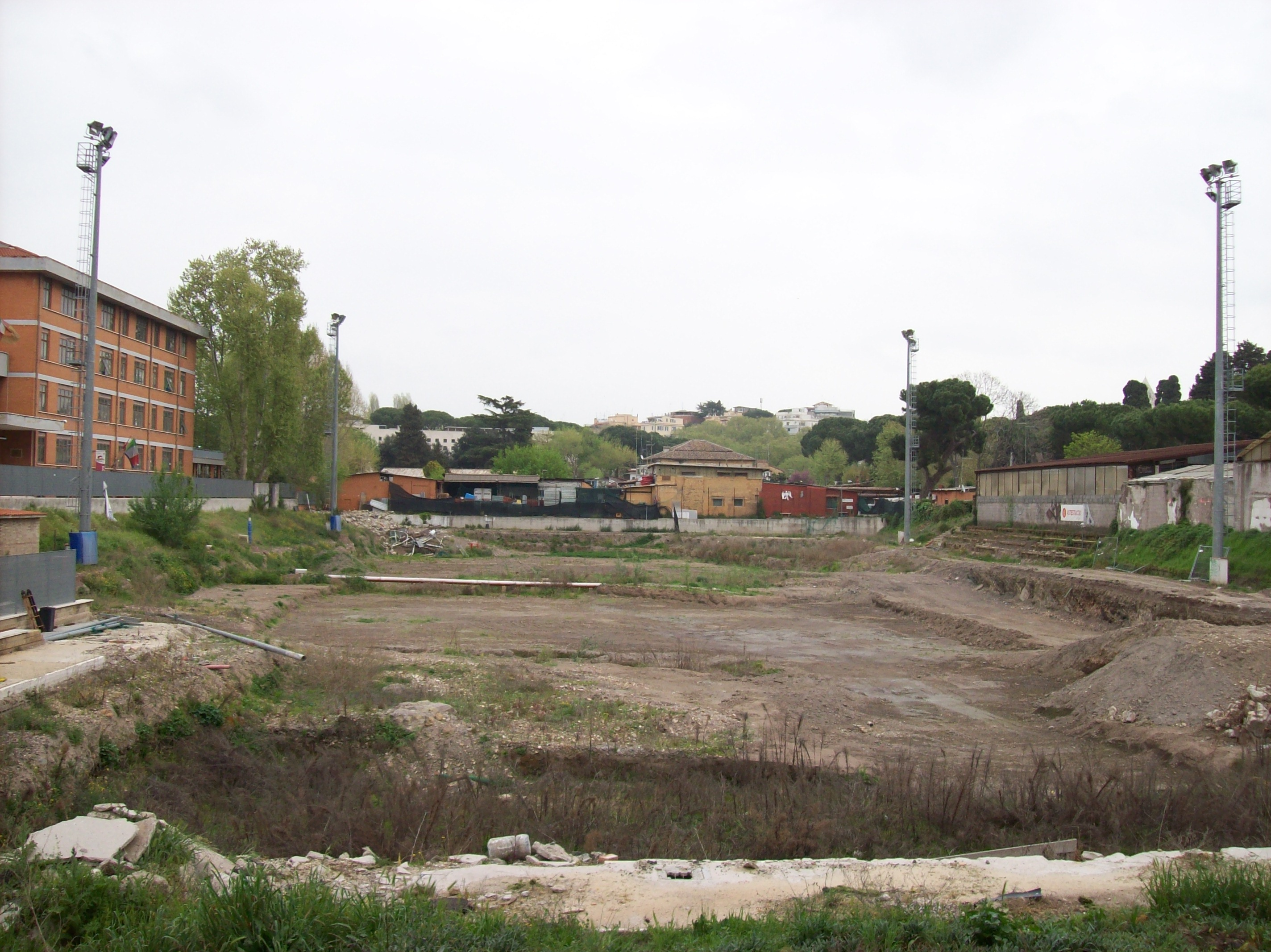
- The stadium site in 2012
- Interactive map of Campo Testaccio
- Full name: Campo Testaccio
- Location: Rome, Italy
- Owner: A.S. Roma
- Operator: A.S. Roma
- Capacity: 20,000

Construction
- Opened: November 3, 1929
- Closed: June 30, 1940
- Demolished: 2011

Tenant
- A.S. Roma

Campo Testaccio was a multi-use stadium in Rome, Italy. It was initially used as the stadium of A.S. Roma matches, before the team moved to Stadio Nazionale PNF, located in Flaminio quarter in 1940. The capacity of the stadium was 20,000 spectators.

The stadium was rebuilt for use by a local team in 2000, but demolished in 2011.
