= 1950–51 Northern Rugby Football League season =

1950–51 Rugby Football League season
- League: Northern Rugby Football League
- Champions: Workington Town
- League Leaders: Warrington
- Top point-scorer: Bert Cook 332
- Top try-scorer: Brian Bevan 68

The 1950–51 Rugby Football League season was the 56th season of rugby league football.

== Season summary ==
Workington Town won their first, and to date, only Championship when they beat Warrington 26–11 in the play-off final. Warrington had finished the regular season as the league leaders.

The Challenge Cup Winners were Wigan who beat Barrow 10–0 in the final.

Warrington won the Lancashire League, and Leeds won the Yorkshire League.

== Championship ==
	Team	Pld	W	D	L	Pts
1	Warrington	36	30	0	6	60
2	Wigan	36	29	1	6	59
3	Workington Town	36	27	0	9	54
4	Leigh	36	24	2	10	50
5	Leeds	36	24	0	12	48
6	St. Helens	36	22	1	13	45
7	Hunslet	36	22	1	13	45
8	Batley	36	21	1	14	43
9	Huddersfield	36	20	2	14	42
10	Wakefield Trinity	36	19	3	14	41
11	Halifax	36	20	0	16	40
12	Belle Vue Rangers	36	19	2	15	40
13	Dewsbury	36	19	2	15	40
14	Bradford Northern	36	19	0	17	38
15	Oldham	36	17	2	17	36
16	Keighley	36	16	3	17	35
17	Swinton	36	16	1	19	33
18	Hull	36	15	2	19	32
19	Salford	36	15	1	20	31
20	Barrow	36	14	2	20	30
21	Whitehaven	36	13	3	20	29
22	Rochdale Hornets	36	14	1	21	29
23	Hull Kingston Rovers	36	12	2	22	26
24	Bramley	36	11	3	22	25
25	Castleford	36	12	1	23	25
26	Featherstone Rovers	36	12	1	23	25
27	Widnes	36	10	1	25	21
28	York	36	8	1	27	17
29	Liverpool Stanley	36	2	1	33	5

=== Play-offs ===
Semi-finals
1	Warrington	15
4	Leigh	9
2	Wigan	5
3	Workington Town	8

Championship final
Warrington	11
Workington Town	26

12 May 1951

Workington Town	26 – 11	Warrington
Tries: Gibson (2), Wilson (2), Lawrenson, Paskins; Goals: Risman (4)		Tries: Heathwood (2), Jackson; Goals: Bath

Maine Road, Manchester
Attendance: 61,618
Referee: A. Hill (Dewsbury)

Workington Town	Number	Warrington
	Teams	
Gus Risman	1	Eric Frodsham
Johnny Lawrenson	2	Brian Bevan
Tony Paskins	3	Bill Jackson
Eppie Gibson	4	Albert Naughton
George Wilson	5	Albert Johnson
John Thomas	6	Bryn Knowelden
Albert Pepperell	7	Gerry Helme
Jimmy Hayton	8	Billy Derbyshire
Vince McKeating	9	Harold Fishwick
Jimmy Wareing	10	Jack Atherton
Rupert Mudge	11	Harry Bath
Steve Thurlow	12	Bob Ryan
Billy Ivison	13	Austin Heathwood
Gus Risman	Coach	Chris Brockbank

== Challenge Cup ==
Wigan beat Barrow 10–0 in the final played at Wembley in front of a crowd of 94,262. This was Wigan's fourth Cup Final win in nine Final appearances. It was also the third successive final that the losing team had failed to score. Cec Mountford, Wigan's stand-off half back was awarded the Lance Todd Trophy for man-of-the-match.

== County cups ==
Wigan beat Warrington 28–5 to win the Lancashire County Cup, and Huddersfield beat Castleford 16–3 to win the Yorkshire County Cup.

== Italy tour ==
An Italian team toured Britain in August 1950, and arranged fixtures against five English clubs and a South Wales team. The team also played three games in France prior to their arrival. The team manager was Dennis Chappell, who was originally from Wakefield, and later became a Turin resident. The team mostly consisted of rugby union players based in Turin, and was captained by Vincenzo Bertolotto, who had previously been capped by the Italy rugby union team.

The squad was: Guido Aleati, Sergio Aleati, Roberto Antonioli, Angelo Arrigoni, Vincenzo Bertolotto, Michele Bietto, Giovanni Bonino, Luigi Bosia, Giuseppe Cannone, Pasquale Cannone, Delio Caron, Gabriele Casalegno, Amerio Chiara, Giorgio Cornacchia, Guido Cornarino, Fabrizio Faglioli, Enzo Francesconi, Giuseppe Franco, Aldo Guglielminotti, Giovanni Orecchia, Luigi Pignattaro, Franco Pipino, Giorgio Rassaval, Giorgio Rubino, Giovanni Tamagno, Oreste Tescari and Giovanni Vigna.

Date	Opponents	Score	Venue
26 August	Wigan	Lost 28–49	St Helens
30 August	St Helens	Lost 38–74	Wigan
2 September	South Wales XIII	Lost 11–29	Bridgend
6 September	Huddersfield	Lost 12–28	Huddersfield
9 September	Leigh	Lost 15–58	Leigh
11 September	Leeds	Lost 41–56	Leeds

== European Championship ==
This was the eleventh European Championships and was won for the third time by France on points difference.

=== Results ===
14 October

England	22–4	Wales

Abertillery

11 November

England	14–9	France

Leeds

10 December

France	16–3	Other nationalities

Bordeaux

31 March

Other nationalities	27–21	Wales

Swansea

11 April

Other nationalities	35–10	England

Wigan

15 April

France	28–13	Wales

Marseille

=== Final standings ===
Team	Played	Won	Drew	Lost	For	Against	Diff	Points
France	3	2	0	1	53	30	+23	4
Other nationalities	3	2	0	1	65	47	+18	4
England	3	2	0	1	46	48	−2	4
Wales	3	0	0	3	38	77	−39	0

== Sources ==
- 1950–51 Rugby Football League season at wigan.rlfans.com
- The Challenge Cup at The Rugby Football League website
