= Felice Rama =

- Full name: Felice Rama

Rugby union career
Coaching career
- Years: Team
- –: R.S. Ginnastica Torino

Felice Rama is an Italian rugby union coach of the 1940s. He coached at club level for R.S. Ginnastica Torino.

== Playing career ==
Felice Rama coached the R.S. Ginnastica Torino team that won the 1947 Campionati italiani.

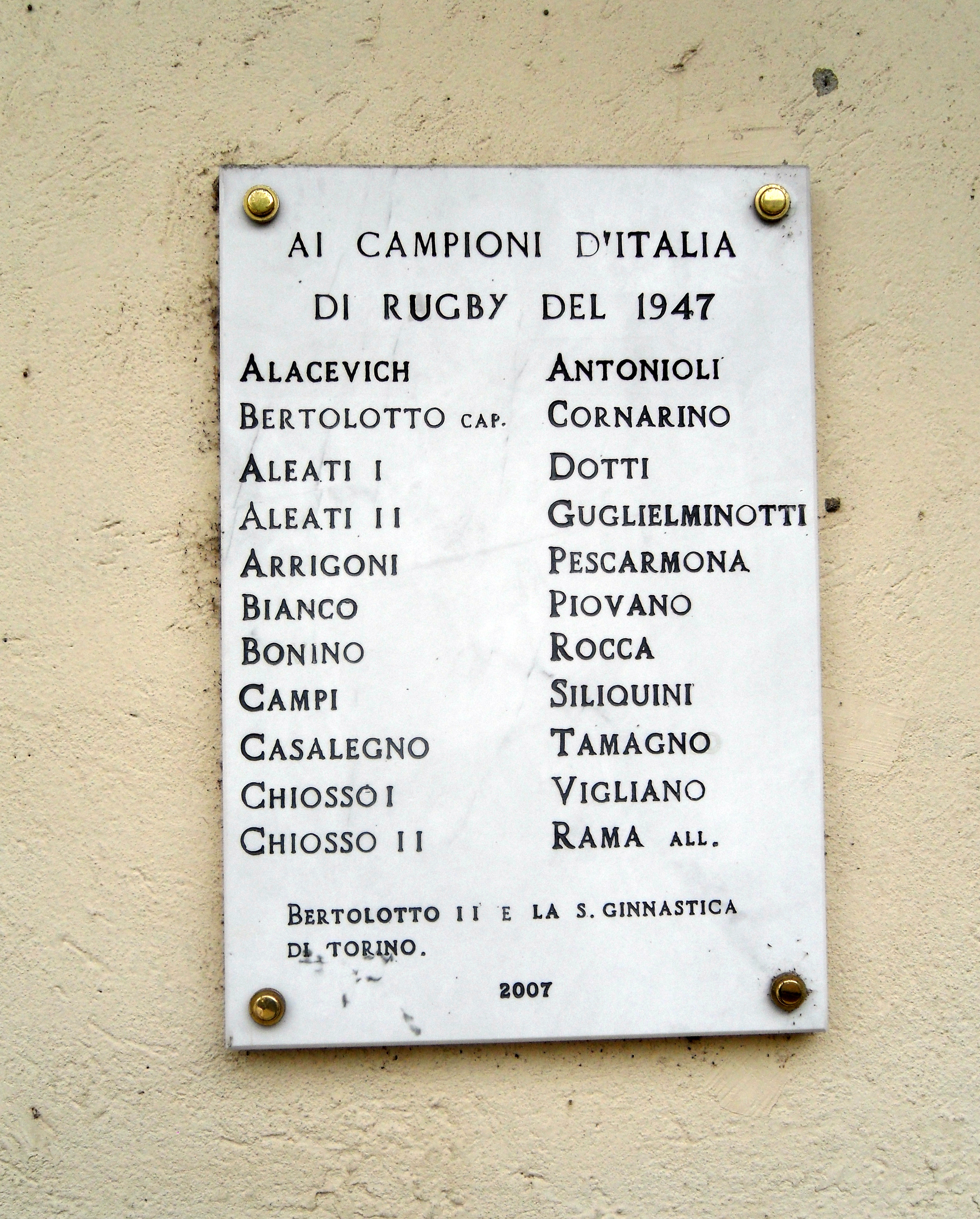
Commemorative plaque in honour of the Italian champions 1947.
