= Vincenzo Bertolotto =

Italian former dual-code rugby international footballer

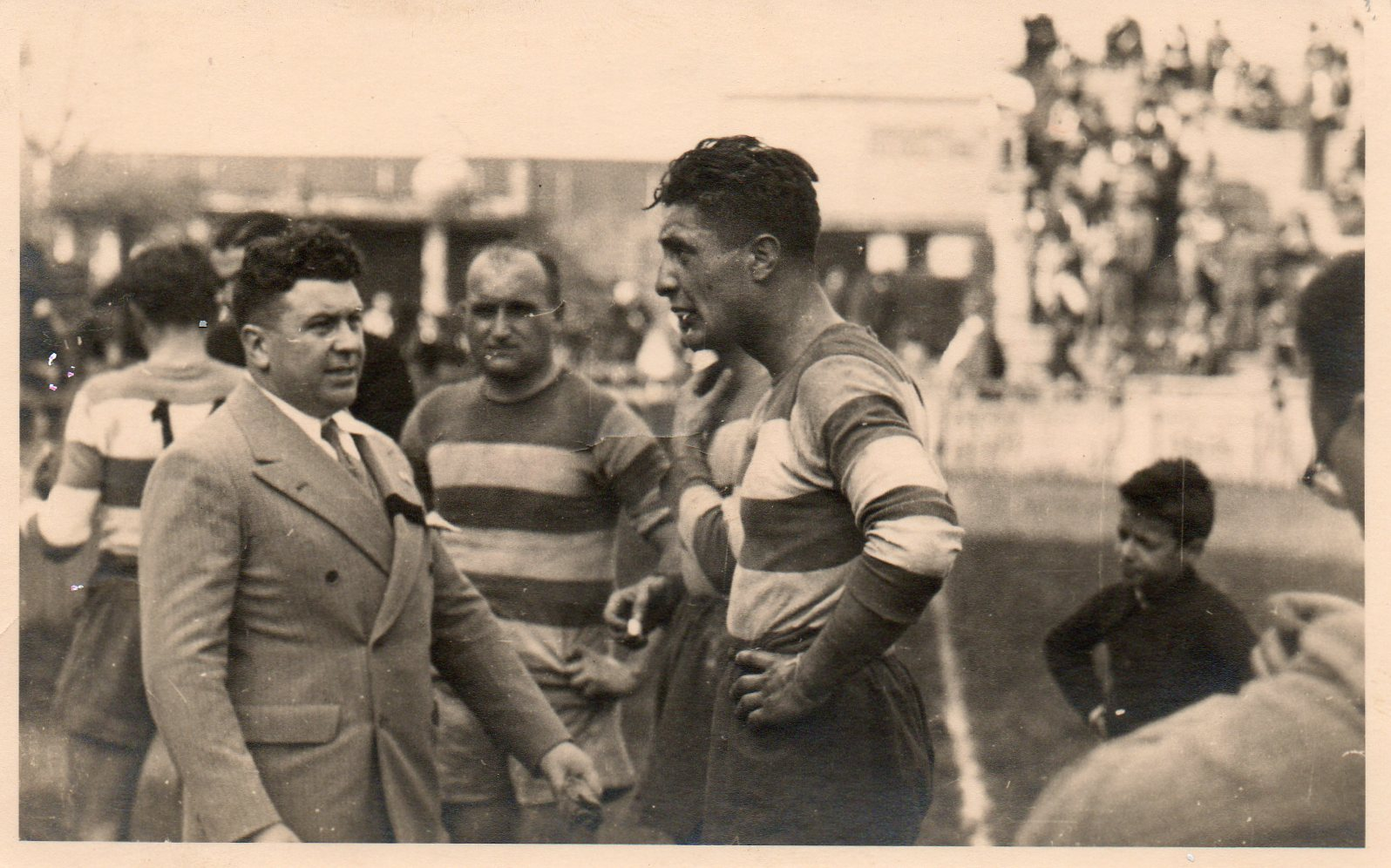
- Vincent Bertolotto and French coach Michel Boucheron

Personal information
- Full name: Vincenzo Bertolotto
- Born: 24 April 1912 Turin, Italy
- Died: 4 April 1992 (aged 79) Turin, Italy

Playing information
- Height: 5 ft 11.5 in (182 cm)
- Weight: 13 st 13 lb (88 kg)

Rugby union
- Position: Lock, Flanker
Club
Years	Team	Pld	T	G	FG	P
1932–42	CUS Torino Rugby
1947–50	R.S. Ginnastica Torino
	Total	0	0	0	0	0
Representative
Years	Team	Pld	T	G	FG	P
1936–48	Italy

Rugby league
- Position: Second-row
Club
Years	Team	Pld	T	G	FG	P
1950–≥50	Torino XIII
Representative
Years	Team	Pld	T	G	FG	P
≤1950–≥50	Italy

Vincenzo Bertolotto (24 April 1912 – 4 April 1992) was an Italian commercial lawyer and dual-code rugby footballer who played rugby union in the 1930s and 1940s before switching to rugby league in 1950s.

For union, he played as a lock or flanker for club sides CUS Torino Rugby and R.S. Ginnastica Torino, the latter of which he captained, as well as Italy national team whom he also captained.

For league, he played as a second-row for Torino XIII and the national team, which to he captained.

He has been described as "Italy's first great cross-code international".

== Club career ==
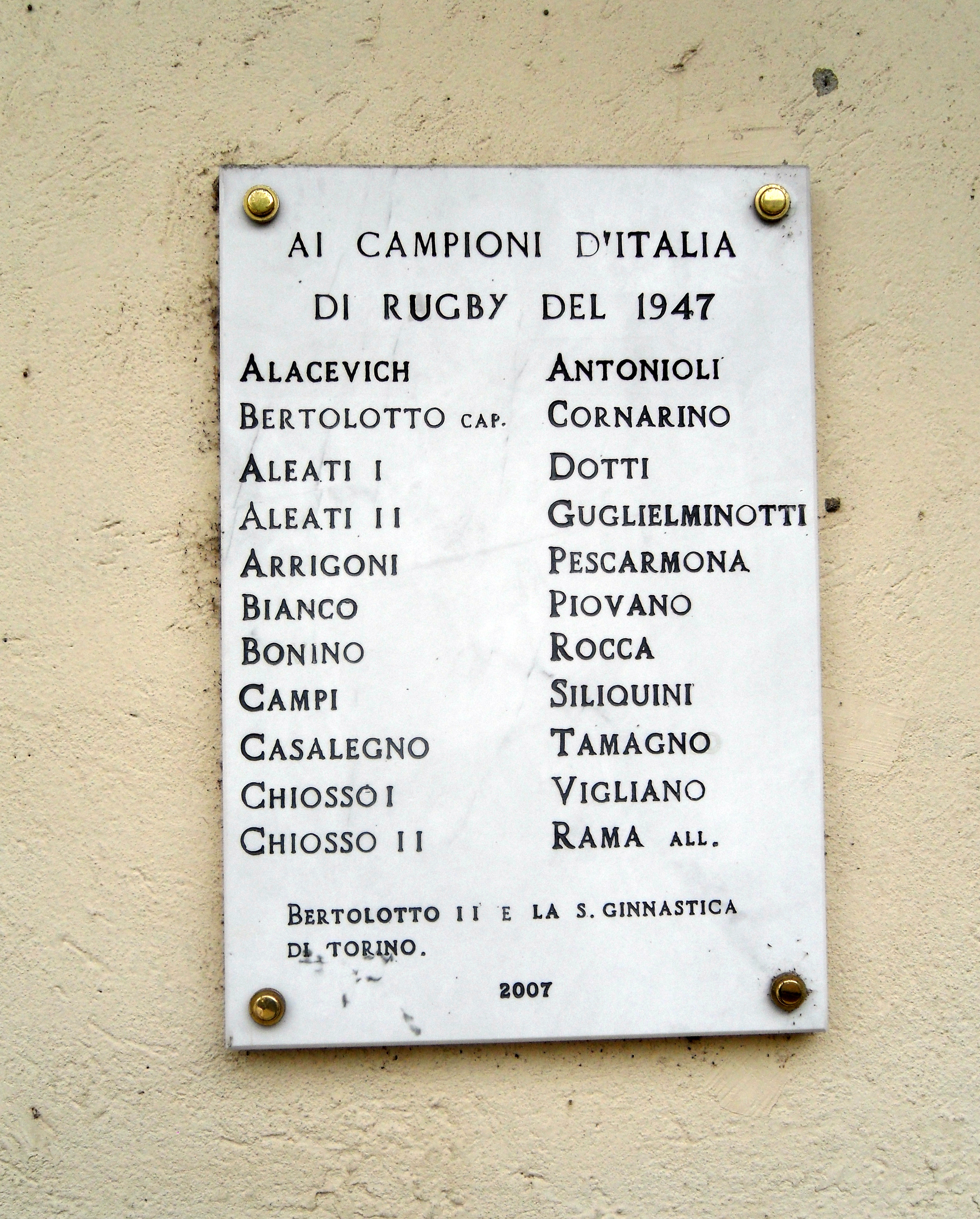
Commemorative plaque in honour of the Italian champions 1947.

=== Rugby union ===
Vincenzo Bertolotto was the captain of the R.S. Ginnastica Torino team that won the 1947 Campionati italiani. In honour of this, Bertolotto's name appears alongside his teammates on a plaque affixed to Motovelodromo Fausto Coppi in Turin, the squad was; eight players that would subsequently accompany Bertolotto on the 1950 rugby league tour.

=== Rugby league ===
Bertolotto was part of Torino XIII team that joined the French league.

== International career ==
=== Rugby union ===
Vincenzo Bertolotto won caps for Italy in the 1936 FIRA Tournament against Germany and Romania, as well as the 1937 edition against the same opponents, the 1942 against Romania, and the 1948 edition, his first as captain, against France.

==== Rugby league ====
Vincenzo Bertolotto co-organised, with Dennis Chappell and a Turin resident, the 1950 Italy tour of Great Britain and France which he captained.

He was part of the Italy squad that toured again in 1954.

== Personal life ==
Bertolotto is the father of the architect Carlo Bertolotto.
