= RS Ginnastica Torino =

Sports club in Italy

Ginnastica Torino
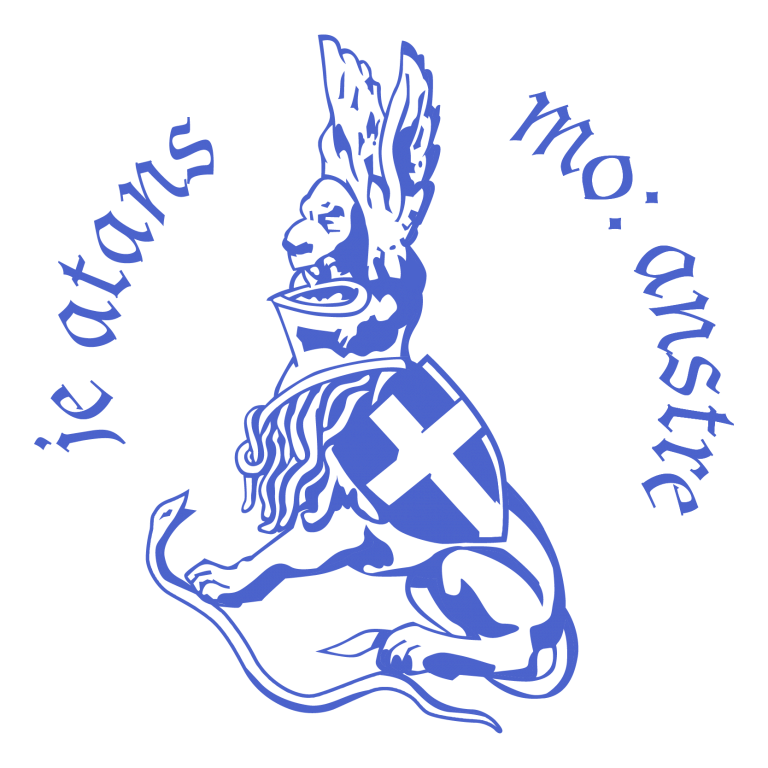
- Full name: Reale Società Ginnastica di Torino
- Founded: 17 March 1844; 182 years ago
- Based in: Turin, Italy
- President: Emanuele Lajolo di Cossano
- Website: realeginnastica.it

Reale Società Ginnastica di Torino is a sports club from Turin, founded on 17 March 1844. It is the oldest of its kind in Italy, it is most famous for competing in the Italian Football Championship with its association football section which opened in 1897.

== Association football ==
The famous Torinese sports club opened its football section in 1897 to compete in the Concorsi Federali di Calcio, a footballing competition organised by FNGI, this competition was in existence before the Italian Football Championship. They were victorious in their first ever competition.

1898 was an eventful year for the club, they competed in the first ever Italian Football Championship, it was played on 8 May 1898 at Velodrome Humbert I in Turin; Ginnastica Torino lost their semi-final match 2–1 to Genoa. However they also entered the Concorsi Federali di Calcio competition that year and won it for the second time by beating a team from Ferrara, Emilia-Romagna.

The following season, the club adopted Campo Piazza d’Armi as their homeground, it was located near Parco Cavalieri di Vittorio Veneto which is in the Santa Rita neighbourhood of Turin. After beating Torinese 2–0 in the elimination match, Ginnastica lost out 2–0 to Internazionale Torino seven days later. After three more unsuccessful seasons in which they went out during the first match (including a 5–0 defeat to Juventus in 1901) the football section of the club stopped competing in 1902.

=== Kits ===
| Home kit | Away kit |

=== Honours ===
Concorsi Federali di Calcio

- Winners: 1897, 1898

== Other sports ==
Various other sporting activities have been practiced by the club, including; judo, artistic gymnastics, basketball and rugby union. In 1947, Ginnastica Torino won the Italian rugby union championship.
