= 2017 World Rugby Nations Cup =

Tournament details
- Countries: Argentina XV; Emerging Italy; Namibia; Russia; Spain; Uruguay
- Tournament format(s): Round-robin
- Date: 10 – 18 June 2017

Tournament statistics
- Teams: 4
- Matches played: 9
- Tries scored: 57 (6.33 per match)
- Top point scorer(s): (Uruguay) Felipe Berchesi (26)
- Top try scorer(s): (Russia) Denis Simplikevich (4)

Final
- Champions: Uruguay (1st title)
- Runners-up: Russia

The 2017 World Rugby Nations Cup was the twelfth edition of the World Rugby Nations Cup rugby union tournament, created by World Rugby. It was the first ever tournament to be played outside of Romania and without their national team, with Uruguay hosting the competition.

Like in 2016, the tournament featured six teams split in two pools of three, where the three European teams; Emerging Italy, Russia and Spain played the other three teams; Argentina XV, Namibia and Uruguay.

Hosts Uruguay won the tournament, the first time they had done so in five previous attempts. It is the third year in a row where the hosts capitalized on the home advantage to claim the title, with previous hosts Romania winning in 2015 and 2016.

== Teams ==
Below are the competing teams with their World Rugby Rankings as of the first tournament date (10 June 2017):

- Argentina XV (n/a)
- Emerging Italy (n/a)
- Namibia (19)
- Russia (20)
- Spain (18)
- Uruguay (21)

== Standings ==
=== Pool A ===
| | Team | Games | | | | Points | | | Tries | | Bonus points | Points |
| | Team | Played | Won | Drawn | Lost | For | Against | Difference | For | Against | Bonus points | Points |
|---|---|---|---|---|---|---|---|---|---|---|---|---|
| 1 | Uruguay | 3 | 3 | 0 | 0 | 86 | 64 | +22 | 9 | 8 | 1 | 13 |
| 2 | Argentina XV | 3 | 2 | 0 | 1 | 90 | 54 | +36 | 13 | 8 | 3 | 11 |
| 3 | Namibia | 3 | 1 | 0 | 2 | 61 | 68 | –7 | 9 | 10 | 2 | 6 |
Source : worldrugby.org Points breakdown: *4 points for a win *2 points for a draw *1 bonus point for a loss by seven points or less *1 bonus point for scoring four or more tries in a match

=== Pool B ===
| | Team | Games | | | | Points | | | Tries | | Bonus points | Points |
| | Team | Played | Won | Drawn | Lost | For | Against | Difference | For | Against | Bonus points | Points |
|---|---|---|---|---|---|---|---|---|---|---|---|---|
| 1 | Russia | 3 | 2 | 0 | 1 | 99 | 80 | +19 | 15 | 12 | 4 | 12 |
| 2 | Spain | 3 | 1 | 0 | 2 | 34 | 74 | –40 | 4 | 8 | 0 | 4 |
| 3 | Emerging Italy | 3 | 0 | 0 | 3 | 53 | 83 | –30 | 7 | 11 | 1 | 1 |
Source : worldrugby.org Points breakdown: *4 points for a win *2 points for a draw *1 bonus point for a loss by seven points or less *1 bonus point for scoring four or more tries in a match

== Fixtures ==
=== Matchday 1 ===
10 June 2017
11:00 UYT (UTC-03)

| (1 BP) Namibia | 13–15 | Spain |
| Try: Botha 49' c Con: Kotzé (1/1) 50'; Pen: Kotzé (2/2) 40', 61' | Report | Try: Tauli (2) 56' m, 64' c Con: Linklater (1/1) 65'; Pen: Linklater (1/1) 12' |

Estadio Charrúa, Montevideo
Referee: Joaquín Montes (Uruguay)

| FB | 15 | Chrysander Botha |
| RW | 14 | Lesley Klim |
| OC | 13 | JC Greyling |
| IC | 12 | Johan Deysel | (substituted off) 62' |
| LW | 11 | Johann Tromp |
| FH | 10 | Theuns Kotzé |
| SH | 9 | Eugene Jantjies | (substituted off) 67' |
| N8 | 8 | Renaldo Bothma (c) |
| OF | 7 | PJ van Lill |
| BF | 6 | Wian Conradie | (substituted off) 67' |
| RL | 5 | Tjiuee Uanivi |
| LL | 4 | Mahepisa Tjeriko | (substituted off) 58' |
| TP | 3 | Aranos Coetzee | (substituted off) 79' |
| HK | 2 | Torsten van Jaarsveld | (substituted off) 75' |
| LP | 1 | Casper Viviers | (substituted off) 79' |
Replacements:
| HK | 16 | Louis van der Westhuizen | (substituted on) 75' |
| PR | 17 | AJ de Klerk | (substituted on) 79' |
| PR | 18 | Collen Smith | (substituted on) 79' |
| FL | 19 | Johan Retief | (substituted on) 58' |
| FL | 20 | Christo van der Merwe | (substituted on) 67' |
| SH | 21 | Damian Stevens | (substituted on) 67' |
| FH | 22 | Cliven Loubser |
| CE | 23 | Darryl de la Harpe | (substituted on) 62' |
Coach:
(Wales) Phil Davies

| FB | 15 | Brad Linklater |
| RW | 14 | Brice Labadie | (substituted off) 53' |
| OC | 13 | Ignacio Contardi |
| IC | 12 | Andrea Rabago |
| LW | 11 | Jordi Jorba |
| FH | 10 | Daniel Snee |
| SH | 9 | Gregory Maiquez |
| N8 | 8 | Jaime Nava de Olano (c) | (substituted off) 52' |
| OF | 7 | Fred Quercy | (substituted off) 61' |
| BF | 6 | Gauthier Gibouin |
| RL | 5 | Victor Sanchez Borrego |
| LL | 4 | Kalokalo Gavidi | (substituted off) 52' |
| TP | 3 | Jon Zabala | (substituted off) 60' |
| HK | 2 | Juan Anaya Lazaro | (substituted off) 58' |
| LP | 1 | Jean-Baptiste Custoja | (substituted off) 51' |
Replacements:
| PR | 16 | Fernando Martin López Perez | (substituted on) 51' |
| HK | 17 | Dani Marrón | (substituted on) 58' |
| PR | 18 | Alberto Blanco | (substituted on) 60' |
| LK | 19 | Matthew Foulds | (substituted on) 52' |
| FL | 20 | Lucas Guillaume | (substituted on) 61' |
| N8 | 21 | Afa Tauli | (substituted on) 52' |
| FH | 22 | Emiliano Calle |
| WG | 23 | Federico Casteglioni | (substituted on) 53' |
Coach:
(Spain) Santiago Santos

Touch judges:
URU Appt. (Uruguay)
URU Appt. (Uruguay)

Notes:

- Lesley Klim, Johan Retief and Mahepisa Tjeriko (all Namibia) and Jean-Baptiste Custoja, Fred Quercy, Andrea Rabago and Afa Tauli (all Spain) made their international debuts.

10 June 2017
13:15 UYT (UTC-03)

| (2 BP) Argentina XV | 38–39 | Russia (1 BP) |
| Try: Gorrissen 2' c Cappiello (2) 11' m, 41' c Medrano 51' m Devoto 57' c Gigena 69' c Con: Díaz Bonilla (3/5) 3', 42', 57'; Elías (1/1) 70' | Report | Try: Simplikevich (2) 17' c, 44' c Temnov 32' c Uzunov 40' m Mikhaltsov 73' m Krotov 78' m Con: Kushnarev (3/4) 18', 33', 45'; Pen: Kushnarev (1/1) 8' |

Estadio Charrúa, Montevideo
Referee: Vlad Iordachescu (Romania)

| FB | 15 | Fernando Luna |
| RW | 14 | Julián Domínguez |
| OC | 13 | Juan Cappiello |
| IC | 12 | Bruno Devoto |
| LW | 11 | Segundo Tuculet | (substituted off) 62' |
| FH | 10 | Joaquín Díaz Bonilla | (substituted off) 68' |
| SH | 9 | Felipe Ezcurra | (substituted off) 62' |
| N8 | 8 | Rodrigo Bruni |
| OF | 7 | Lautaro Bavaro (c) | (substituted off) 62' |
| BF | 6 | Francisco Gorrissen |
| RL | 5 | Ignacio Larrague |
| LL | 4 | Juan Cruz Guillemaín | (substituted off) 47' |
| TP | 3 | Cristian Bartoloni | (substituted off) 46' |
| HK | 2 | Gaspar Baldunciel | (substituted off) 7' | (substituted off) 75' |
| LP | 1 | Franco Brarda | (substituted off) 61' | (substituted on) 75' |
Replacements:
| HK | 16 | Roberto Tejerizo | (substituted on) 7' |
| PR | 17 | Facundo Gigena | (substituted on) 61' |
| PR | 18 | Santiago Medrano | (substituted on) 46' |
| FL | 19 | Santiago Portillo | (substituted on) 47' |
| N8 | 20 | Santiago Montagner | (substituted on) 62' |
| SH | 21 | Lautaro Bazán Vélez | (substituted on) 62' |
| FH | 22 | Martín Elías | (substituted on) 68' |
| WG | 23 | Franco Cuaranta | (substituted on) 62' |
Coach:
(Argentina) Felipe Contepomi

| FB | 15 | Vasily Artemyev (c) |
| RW | 14 | Denis Simplikevich |
| OC | 13 | Kirill Gubin | (substituted off) 61' |
| IC | 12 | Dmitry Gerasimov |
| LW | 11 | Alexei Mikhaltsov |
| FH | 10 | Yuri Kushnarev | (substituted off) 61' |
| SH | 9 | Konstantin Uzunov | (substituted off) 66' |
| N8 | 8 | Anton Rudoy |
| OF | 7 | Tagir Gadzhiev | (substituted off) 59' |
| BF | 6 | Andrei Temnov | (substituted off) 59' |
| RL | 5 | Bogdan Fedotko |
| LL | 4 | Dmitri Krotov |
| TP | 3 | Azamat Bitiev | (substituted off) 53' |
| HK | 2 | Stanislav Selksy | (substituted off) 66' |
| LP | 1 | Andrei Polivalov | (substituted off) 53' |
Replacements:
| HK | 16 | Sergey Chernyshev | (substituted on) 63' |
| PR | 17 | Valery Morozov | (substituted on) 53' |
| PR | 18 | Vladimir Podrezov | (substituted on) 53' |
| LK | 19 | Vladimir Suslov | (substituted on) 59' |
| FL | 20 | Victor Gresev | (substituted on) 59' |
| SH | 21 | Alexei Shcherban | (substituted on) 66' |
| CE | 22 | Vladimir Rudenko | (substituted on) 61' |
| FH | 23 | Ramil Gaisin | (substituted on) 61' |
Coach:
(Russia) Alexander Pervukhin

Touch judges:
URU Appt. (Uruguay)
URU Appt. (Uruguay)

Notes:

- This was the first ever time that Russia has beaten Argentina XV (formally known as Argentina Jaguars).
- Kirill Gubin (Russia) made his international debut.

10 June 2017
15:30 UYT (UTC-03)

| Uruguay | 30–21 | Emerging Italy |
| Try: Arata 13' c Cat 43' c Lijtenstein 63' c Con: Albanell (2/2) 14', 44'; Silva (1/1) 64'; Pen: Albanell (2/2) 22', 35'; Silva (1/1) 75' | Report | Try: Buscema 29' c Iacobs 40' c Giammarioli 66' c Con: Azzolini (2/2) 30', 40'; Mantelli (1/1) 67' |

Estadio Charrúa, Montevideo
Referee: Kurt Weaver (United States)

| FB | 15 | Rodrigo Silva |
| RW | 14 | Gastón Gibernau |
| OC | 13 | Juan Manuel Cat |
| IC | 12 | Andrés Vilaseca |
| LW | 11 | Leandro Leivas |
| FH | 10 | German Albanell | | (substituted off) 50' |
| SH | 9 | Santiago Arata | | (substituted off) 59' |
| N8 | 8 | Manuel Diana | | (substituted off) 33' | (substituted on) 38' |
| OF | 7 | Gonzalo Soto | | (substituted off) 55' |
| BF | 6 | Juan Manuel Gaminara (c) | | (substituted off) 60' |
| RL | 5 | Manuel Leindekar | | (substituted off) 40' |
| LL | 4 | Diego Magno |
| TP | 3 | Juan Echeverría | | (substituted off) 55' |
| HK | 2 | Germán Kessler | | | | (substituted off) 52' |
| LP | 1 | Matías Benítez | (yellow card) 27' to 37' | (substituted off) 71' |
Replacements:
| HK | 16 | Facundo Gattas | | (substituted on) 33' | (substituted off) 38' | (substituted on) 52' |
| PR | 17 | Mateo Sanguinetti | | (substituted on) 71' |
| PR | 18 | Mario Sagario | | (substituted on) 55' |
| LK | 19 | Ignacio Dotti | | (substituted on) 40' |
| N8 | 20 | Alejandro Nieto | | (substituted on) 55' |
| FL | 21 | Santiago Hernández | | (substituted on) 60' |
| SH | 22 | Guillermo Lijtenstein | | (substituted on) 59' |
| CE | 23 | Agustín Della Corte | | (substituted on) 50' |
Coach:
(Argentina) Esteban Meneses

| FB | 15 | Filippo Buscema |
| RW | 14 | Pierre Bruno |
| OC | 13 | Andrea Bettin |
| IC | 12 | Enrico Lucchin |
| LW | 11 | Marco Susio | (substituted off) 63' |
| FH | 10 | Maicol Azzolini | (substituted off) 56' |
| SH | 9 | Simone Marinaro |
| N8 | 8 | Renato Giammarioli | (substituted off) 68' |
| OF | 7 | Sebastian Negri (c) | (substituted off) 5' |
| BF | 6 | Matteo Corazzi |
| RL | 5 | Leonard Krumov |
| LL | 4 | Samuele Ortis | (substituted off) 59' |
| TP | 3 | George Iacobs | (substituted off) 56' |
| HK | 2 | Engjel Makelara | (substituted off) 40' |
| LP | 1 | Derrick Appiah | (substituted off) 47' |
Replacements:
| HK | 16 | Adriano Daniele | (substituted on) 40' |
| PR | 17 | Niccolò Zago | (substituted on) 47' |
| PR | 18 | Roberto Tenga | (substituted on) 56' |
| LK | 19 | Davide Fragnito | (substituted on) 59' |
| FL | 20 | Mirko Amenta | (substituted on) 5' |
| FB | 21 | Leonardo Mantelli | (substituted on) 56' |
| SH | 22 | Pietro Gregorio | (substituted on) 68' |
| CE | 23 | Giacomo de Santis | (substituted on) 63' |
Coaches:
(Italy) Carlo Orlandi (Italy) Gianluca Guidi

Touch judges:
URU Appt. (Uruguay)
URU Appt. (Uruguay)

Notes:

- Agustín Della Corte (Uruguay) made his international debut.

=== Matchday 2 ===
14 June 2017
11:00 UYT (UTC-03)

| (1 BP) Namibia | 38–22 | Emerging Italy |
| Try: Klim (2) 28' c, 75' c Bothma 51' m Greyling 55' c Kotzé 63' c Wilson 80' m Con: Kotzé (4/6) 29', 55', 63', 76' | Report | Try: De Santis 9' m Marinaro 15' c Amenta 39' c Con: Azzolini (2/3) 16', 39'; Pen: Azzolini (1/1) 23' |

Estadio Charrúa, Montevideo
Referee: Iñigo Atorrasagasti (Spain)

| FB | 15 | Johann Tromp | (substituted off) 75' |
| RW | 14 | Lesley Klim |
| OC | 13 | JC Greyling | (substituted off) 77' |
| IC | 12 | Darryl de la Harpe |
| LW | 11 | Gino Wilson |
| FH | 10 | Theuns Kotzé |
| SH | 9 | Damian Stevens | (substituted off) 50' |
| N8 | 8 | Renaldo Bothma (c) |
| OF | 7 | Janco Venter |
| BF | 6 | Christo van der Merwe | (substituted off) 50' |
| RL | 5 | Tjiuee Uanivi |
| LL | 4 | Ruan Ludick | (substituted off) 64' |
| TP | 3 | Aranos Coetzee | (substituted off) 71' |
| HK | 2 | Louis van der Westhuizen | (substituted off) 77' |
| LP | 1 | Collen Smith | (substituted off) 54' |
Replacements:
| HK | 16 | Shaun du Preez | (substituted on) 77' |
| PR | 17 | AJ de Klerk | (substituted on) 71' |
| PR | 18 | Casper Viviers | (substituted on) 54' |
| FL | 19 | PJ van Lill | (substituted on) 64' |
| FL | 20 | Wian Conradie | (substituted on) 50' |
| SH | 21 | Eugene Jantjies | (substituted on) 75' |
| FH | 22 | Cliven Loubser | (substituted on) 50' |
| CE | 23 | Justin Newman | (substituted on) 77' |
Coach:
(Wales) Phil Davies

| FB | 15 | Filippo Buscema |
| RW | 14 | Pierre Bruno |
| OC | 13 | Matteo Gabbianelli |
| IC | 12 | Enrico Lucchin |
| LW | 11 | Giacomo De Santis | | (substituted off) 57' |
| FH | 10 | Maicol Azzolini |
| SH | 9 | Simone Marinaro (c) | | (substituted off) 78' |
| N8 | 8 | Mirko Amenta |
| OF | 7 | Renato Giammarioli | | (substituted off) 77' |
| BF | 6 | Matteo Corazzi |
| RL | 5 | Leonard Krumov |
| LL | 4 | Riccardo Michieletto | | (substituted off) 40' |
| TP | 3 | George Iacobs | | (substituted off) 53' |
| HK | 2 | Engjel Makelara | | (substituted off) 53' |
| LP | 1 | Derrick Appiah | | (substituted off) 40' |
Replacements:
| HK | 16 | Adriano Daniele | | (substituted on) 53' |
| PR | 17 | Paolo Buonfiglio | | (substituted on) 40' |
| PR | 18 | Roberto Tenga | | (substituted on) 53' |
| LK | 19 | Samuele Ortis | | (substituted on) 40' |
| FL | 20 | Luca Nostran | | (substituted on) 77' |
| SH | 21 | Pietro Gregorio | | (substituted on) 78' |
| WG | 22 | Andrea Bettin | (red card) 73' | (substituted on) 57' |
| CE | 23 | Matteo Manganiello |
Coaches:
(Italy) Carlo Orlandi (Italy) Gianluca Guidi

Touch judges:
URU Appt. (Uruguay)
URU Appt. (Uruguay)

14 June 2017
13:15 UYT (UTC-03)

| (1 BP) Argentina XV | 37–5 | Spain |
| Try: Sábato (2) 1' c, 65' c Cuaranta 57' m Cappiello 62' c Bavaro 70' m Con: Díaz Bonilla (1/1) 3'; Mare (1/1) 62'; Pen: Díaz Bonilla (1/1) 35'; Elías (2/3) 53', 66' | Report | Try: Contardi 59' m |

Estadio Charrúa, Montevideo
Referee: Joaquín Montes (Uruguay)

| FB | 15 | Martín Elías |
| RW | 14 | Franco Sábato |
| OC | 13 | Juan Cappiello (c) | | (substituted off) 67' |
| IC | 12 | Santiago Mare |
| LW | 11 | Franco Cuaranta |
| FH | 10 | Joaquín Díaz Bonilla | | (substituted off) 52' |
| SH | 9 | Lautaro Bazán Vélez | | (substituted off) 51' |
| N8 | 8 | Santiago Portillo |
| OF | 7 | Santiago Montagner | | (substituted off) 54' |
| BF | 6 | Mariano Romanini | | (substituted off) 28' | (substituted on) 37' |
| RL | 5 | Ignacio Larrague | | (substituted off) 68' |
| LL | 4 | Pedro Ortega |
| TP | 3 | Facundo Gigena | (yellow card) 27' to 37' |
| HK | 2 | Roberto Tejerizo | | (substituted off) 46' |
| LP | 1 | Francisco Ferronato | | (substituted off) 74' |
Replacements:
| HK | 16 | Agustín Gómez di Nardo | (yellow card) 79' to 80' | (substituted on) 46' |
| PR | 17 | Franco Brarda | | (substituted on) 74' |
| PR | 18 | Santiago Medrano | | (substituted on) 28' | (substituted off) 37' |
| LK | 19 | Juan Cruz Guillemaín | | (substituted on) 68' |
| FL | 20 | Lautaro Bavaro | | (substituted on) 54' |
| SH | 21 | Felipe Ezcurra | | (substituted on) 51' |
| CE | 22 | Bruno Devoto | | (substituted on) 67' |
| FB | 23 | Fernando Luna | | (substituted on) 52' |
Coach:
(Argentina) Felipe Contepomi

| FB | 15 | Brad Linklater |
| RW | 14 | Federico Casteglioni |
| OC | 13 | Inaki Mateu |
| IC | 12 | Andrea Rabago | | (substituted off) 40' |
| LW | 11 | Ignacio Contardi | | (substituted off) 74' |
| FH | 10 | Alvar Gimeno | | (substituted off) 51' |
| SH | 9 | Tomás Munilla |
| N8 | 8 | Afa Tauli |
| OF | 7 | Lucas Guillaume |
| BF | 6 | Jaime Nava de Olano (c) | | (substituted off) 49' |
| RL | 5 | Matthew Foulds | | (substituted off) 59' |
| LL | 4 | Manuel Mora Ruiz |
| TP | 3 | Alberto Blanco | | (substituted off) 55' |
| HK | 2 | Dani Marrón | | (substituted off) 49' |
| LP | 1 | Fernando Martin López Perez | | (substituted off) 55' |
Replacements:
| PR | 16 | Jean-Baptiste Custoja | | (substituted on) 55' |
| HK | 17 | Juan Anaya Lazaro | | (substituted on) 49' |
| PR | 18 | Agustín Ortiz Crivelli | | (substituted on) 55' |
| LK | 19 | Victor Sanchez Borrego | | (substituted on) 59' |
| FL | 20 | Fred Quercy | (yellow card) 53' to 63' | (substituted on) 49' |
| SH | 21 | Gregory Maiquez | | (substituted on) 74' |
| FH | 22 | Emiliano Calle | | (substituted on) 40' |
| WG | 23 | Jordi Jorba | | (substituted on) 51' |
Coach:
(Spain) Santiago Santos

Touch judges:
URU Appt. (Uruguay)
URU Appt. (Uruguay)

Notes:

- Emiliano Calle, Inaki Mateu and Tomás Munilla (all Spain) made their international debut.

14 June 2017
15:30 UYT (UTC-03)

| (1 BP) Uruguay | 32–29 | Russia (2 BP) |
| Try: Silva (2) 23' m, 60' c Arata 40' c Gibernau 44' c Con: Berchesi (3/4) 40', 45', 61'; Pen: Berchesi (2/2) 2', 55' | Report | Try: Gerasimov 5' c Gritsenko 9' c Simplikevich 40' c Rudoy 72' m Con: Kushnarev (3/4) 5', 10', 40'; Drop: Kushnarev (1/1) 32' |

Estadio Charrúa, Montevideo
Referee: Kurt Weaver (United States)

| FB | 15 | Rodrigo Silva |
| RW | 14 | Leandro Leivas |
| OC | 13 | Juan Manuel Cat |
| IC | 12 | Andrés Vilaseca | | (substituted off) 74' |
| LW | 11 | Gastón Mieres | | (substituted off) 18' |
| FH | 10 | Felipe Berchesi |
| SH | 9 | Santiago Arata | | (substituted off) 50' |
| N8 | 8 | Alejandro Nieto |
| OF | 7 | Franco Lamanna | (yellow card) 64' to 74' |
| BF | 6 | Juan Manuel Gaminara (c) |
| RL | 5 | Diego Ayala | | (substituted off) 50' |
| LL | 4 | Ignacio Dotti |
| TP | 3 | Mario Sagario | | (substituted off) 50' |
| HK | 2 | Martín Espiga | | (substituted off) 72' |
| LP | 1 | Mateo Sanguinetti | | (substituted off) 72' |
Replacements:
| HK | 16 | Germán Kessler | | (substituted on) 72' |
| PR | 17 | Matías Benítez | | (substituted on) 72' |
| PR | 18 | Juan Echeverría | | (substituted on) 59' |
| N8 | 19 | Manuel Diana |
| LK | 20 | Diego Magno | | (substituted on) 50' |
| SH | 21 | Agustín Ormaechea | | (substituted on) 50' |
| WG | 22 | Gastón Gibernau | | (substituted on) 18' |
| CE | 23 | Agustín Della Corte | | (substituted on) 74' |
Coach:
(Argentina) Esteban Meneses

| FB | 15 | Ramil Gaisin | (substituted off) 64' |
| RW | 14 | Denis Simplikevich |
| OC | 13 | Vladimir Rudenko | (substituted off) 48' |
| IC | 12 | Dmitry Gerasimov |
| LW | 11 | Vasily Artemyev (c) |
| FH | 10 | Yuri Kushnarev |
| SH | 9 | Alexei Shcherban | (substituted off) 63' |
| N8 | 8 | Anton Rudoy |
| OF | 7 | Dmitri Gritsenko |
| BF | 6 | Victor Gresev | (substituted off) 46' |
| RL | 5 | Vladimir Suslov | (substituted off) 46' |
| LL | 4 | Dmitri Krotov |
| TP | 3 | Azamat Bitiev | (substituted off) 40' |
| HK | 2 | Stanislav Selksy | (substituted off) 72' |
| LP | 1 | Andrei Polivalov | 31' to 40' | | (substituted off) 50' |
Replacements:
| HK | 16 | Sergey Chernyshev | (substituted on) 72' |
| PR | 17 | Valery Morozov | (substituted on) 31' | (substituted off) 40' | (substituted on) 50' |
| PR | 18 | Vladimir Podrezov | (substituted on) 40' |
| FL | 19 | Andrei Temnov | (substituted on) 46' |
| FL | 20 | Tagir Gadzhiev | (substituted on) 46' |
| SH | 21 | Konstantin Uzunov | (substituted on) 63' |
| WG | 22 | Evgeni Nepeivoda | (substituted on) 64' |
| FB | 23 | Alexander Budychenko | (substituted on) 48' |
Coach:
(Russia) Alexander Pervukhin

Touch judges:
URU Appt. (Uruguay)
URU Appt. (Uruguay)

Notes:

- Alexander Budychenko and Evgeni Nepeivoda (both Russia) made their international debuts.

=== Matchday 3 ===
18 June 2017
11:00 UYT (UTC-03)

| Namibia | 10–31 | Russia (1 BP) |
| Try: Botha 21' m Wilson 60' m | Report | Try: Simplikevich 12' m Fedotko 17' c Penalty try 28'; Artemyev 47' m Podrezov 50' c Con: Kushnarev (2/4) 18', 51' |

Estadio Charrúa, Montevideo
Referee: Kurt Weaver (United States)

| FB | 15 | Chrysander Botha |
| RW | 14 | Johann Tromp |
| OC | 13 | Justin Newman |
| IC | 12 | Darryl de la Harpe | (substituted off) 49' |
| LW | 11 | Gino Wilson |
| FH | 10 | Theuns Kotzé | (substituted off) 69' |
| SH | 9 | Damian Stevens | (substituted off) 65' |
| N8 | 8 | Renaldo Bothma (c) |
| OF | 7 | Janco Venter | (substituted off) 35' | (substituted on) 40' | (substituted off) 75' |
| BF | 6 | Wian Conradie |
| RL | 5 | Tjiuee Uanivi | (substituted off) 16' |
| LL | 4 | Ruan Ludick |
| TP | 3 | AJ de Klerk | (substituted off) 57' |
| HK | 2 | Louis van der Westhuizen | (substituted off) 72' |
| LP | 1 | Casper Viviers | (substituted off) 57' |
Replacements:
| HK | 16 | Shaun du Preez | (substituted on) 72' |
| PR | 17 | Collen Smith | (substituted on) 57' |
| PR | 18 | Aranos Coetzee | (substituted on) 57' |
| LK | 19 | Mahepisa Tjeriko | (substituted on) 35' | (substituted off) 40' | (substituted on) 75' |
| FL | 20 | PJ van Lill | (substituted on) 16' |
| SH | 21 | Eugene Jantjies | (substituted on) 65' |
| FH | 22 | Cliven Loubser | (substituted on) 69' |
| CE | 23 | JC Greyling | (substituted on) 49' |
Coach:
(Wales) Phil Davies

| FB | 15 | Vasily Artemyev (c) |
| RW | 14 | Denis Simplikevich |
| OC | 13 | Vladimir Rudenko | (substituted off) 73' |
| IC | 12 | Dmitry Gerasimov |
| LW | 11 | Alexei Mikhaltsov |
| FH | 10 | Yuri Kushnarev | (substituted off) 61' |
| SH | 9 | Alexei Shcherban | (substituted off) 51' |
| N8 | 8 | Anton Rudoy |
| OF | 7 | Tagir Gadzhiev | (substituted off) 40' |
| BF | 6 | Andrei Temnov |
| RL | 5 | Bogdan Fedotko | (substituted off) 51' |
| LL | 4 | Dmitri Krotov |
| TP | 3 | Vladimir Podrezov | (substituted off) 61' |
| HK | 2 | Stanislav Selksy | (substituted off) 71' |
| LP | 1 | Valery Morozov | (substituted off) 61' |
Replacements:
| HK | 16 | Sergey Chernyshev | (substituted on) 71' |
| PR | 17 | Andrei Polivalov | (substituted on) 61' |
| PR | 18 | Evgeni Mishechkin | (substituted on) 61' |
| LK | 19 | Dmitri Gritsenko | (substituted on) 51' |
| FL | 20 | Victor Gresev | (substituted on) 40' |
| SH | 21 | Konstantin Uzunov | (substituted on) 51' |
| FB | 22 | Alexander Budychenko | (substituted on) 73' |
| FH | 23 | Ramil Gaisin | (substituted on) 61' |
Coach:
(Russia) Alexander Pervukhin

Touch judges:
URU Appt. (Uruguay)
URU Appt. (Uruguay)

Notes:

- Justin Newman and Cliven Loubser (both Namibia) and Evgeni Mishechkin (Russia) made their international debuts.

18 June 2017
13:15 UYT (UTC-03)

| Argentina XV | 15–10 | Emerging Italy (1 BP) |
| Try: Cuaranta 4' c Larrague 76' m Con: Díaz Bonilla (1/1) 4'; Pen: Díaz Bonilla (1/1) 23' | Report | Try: Minozzi 10' c Con: Mantelli (1/1) 11'; Pen: Mantelli (1/2) 46' |

Estadio Charrúa, Montevideo
Referee: Iñigo Atorrasagasti (Spain)

| FB | 15 | Fernando Luna |
| RW | 14 | Julián Domínguez |
| OC | 13 | Juan Cappiello |
| IC | 12 | Bruno Devoto | | (substituted off) 64' |
| LW | 11 | Franco Cuaranta |
| FH | 10 | Joaquín Díaz Bonilla | | (substituted off) 47' |
| SH | 9 | Felipe Ezcurra |
| N8 | 8 | Rodrigo Bruni | | (substituted off) 48' | (substituted on) 59' |
| OF | 7 | Lautaro Bavaro (c) | | (substituted off) 67' |
| BF | 6 | Francisco Gorrissen |
| RL | 5 | Ignacio Larrague |
| LL | 4 | Pedro Ortega | | (substituted off) 58' |
| TP | 3 | Santiago Medrano |
| HK | 2 | Agustín Gómez di Nardo | | (substituted off) 60' |
| LP | 1 | Franco Brarda | | (substituted off) 47' |
Replacements:
| HK | 16 | Roberto Tejerizo | | (substituted on) 60' |
| PR | 17 | Francisco Ferronato | | (substituted on) 47' |
| PR | 18 | Cristian Bartoloni | | (substituted on) 48' | (substituted off) 59' |
| FL | 19 | Santiago Portillo | | (substituted on) 58' |
| N8 | 20 | Santiago Montagner | (yellow card) 79' to 80' | (substituted on) 67' |
| SH | 21 | Lautaro Bazán Vélez |
| FH | 22 | Martín Elías | | (substituted on) 47' |
| CE | 23 | Segundo Tuculet | | (substituted on) 64' |
Coach:
(Argentina) Felipe Contepomi

| FB | 15 | Matteo Minozzi |
| RW | 14 | Pierre Bruno | (yellow card) 1' to 11' |
| OC | 13 | Matteo Gabbianelli | | (substituted off) 65' |
| IC | 12 | Enrico Lucchin |
| LW | 11 | Matteo Manganiello |
| FH | 10 | Leonardo Mantelli |
| SH | 9 | Simone Marinaro (c) |
| N8 | 8 | Mirko Amenta | | (substituted off) 37' |
| OF | 7 | Renato Giammarioli |
| BF | 6 | Matteo Corazzi |
| RL | 5 | Leonard Krumov |
| LL | 4 | Samuele Ortis |
| TP | 3 | George Iacobs | (yellow card) 45' to 55' | (substituted off) 55' |
| HK | 2 | Engjel Makelara | | (substituted off) 77' |
| LP | 1 | Derrick Appiah | | (substituted off) 50' |
Replacements:
| HK | 16 | Adriano Daniele | | (substituted on) 77' |
| PR | 17 | Paolo Buonfiglio |
| PR | 18 | Roberto Tenga | | (substituted on) 55' |
| PR | 19 | Niccolò Zago | | (substituted on) 50' |
| FL | 20 | Luca Nostran | | (substituted on) 37' |
| SH | 21 | Pietro Gregorio |
| FH | 22 | Filippo Buscema |
| WG | 23 | Marco Susio | | (substituted on) 65' |
Coaches:
(Italy) Carlo Orlandi (Italy) Gianluca Guidi

Touch judges:
URU Appt. (Uruguay)
URU Appt. (Uruguay)

18 June 2017
15:30 UYT (UTC-03)

| Uruguay | 24–14 | Spain |
| Try: Arata 40' c Leivas 79' m Con: F. Berchesi (1/2) 41'; Pen: F. Berchesi (4/4) 6', 22', 29', 63' | Report | Try: Borrego 73' m Pen: Linklater (3/3) 18', 43', 61' |

Estadio Charrúa, Montevideo
Referee: Vlad Iordachescu (Romania)

| FB | 15 | Rodrigo Silva | (substituted off) 55' |
| RW | 14 | Leandro Leivas |
| OC | 13 | Juan Manuel Cat |
| IC | 12 | Andrés Vilaseca |
| LW | 11 | Gastón Gibernau |
| FH | 10 | Felipe Berchesi |
| SH | 9 | Santiago Arata | (substituted off) 47' |
| N8 | 8 | Alejandro Nieto | (substituted off) 77' |
| OF | 7 | Gonzalo Soto |
| BF | 6 | Juan Manuel Gaminara (c) |
| RL | 5 | Diego Ayala | (substituted off) 69' |
| LL | 4 | Ignacio Dotti |
| TP | 3 | Mario Sagario | (substituted off) 54' |
| HK | 2 | Martín Espiga | (substituted off) 40' |
| LP | 1 | Mateo Sanguinetti | (substituted off) 60' |
Replacements:
| HK | 16 | Germán Kessler | (substituted on) 40' |
| PR | 17 | Matías Benítez | (substituted on) 60' |
| PR | 18 | Juan Echeverría | (substituted on) 54' |
| N8 | 19 | Manuel Diana | (substituted on) 77' |
| LK | 20 | Diego Magno | (substituted on) 69' |
| SH | 21 | Agustín Ormaechea | (substituted on) 47' |
| FH | 22 | Francisco Berchesi | (substituted on) 55' |
| CE | 23 | Agustín Della Corte |
Coach:
(Argentina) Esteban Meneses

| FB | 15 | Brad Linklater |
| RW | 14 | Jordi Jorba |
| OC | 13 | Federico Casteglioni | | (substituted off) 54' |
| IC | 12 | Alvar Gimeno |
| LW | 11 | Ignacio Contardi |
| FH | 10 | Daniel Snee |
| SH | 9 | Gregory Maiquez | | (substituted off) 79' |
| N8 | 8 | Jaime Nava de Olano (c) | | (substituted off) 50' |
| OF | 7 | Fred Quercy | | (substituted off) 59' |
| BF | 6 | Gauthier Gibouin | | | (substituted off) 58' | (substituted on) 67' |
| RL | 5 | Victor Sanchez Borrego |
| LL | 4 | Kalokalo Gavidi | | (substituted off) 63' |
| TP | 3 | Jon Zabala | | (substituted off) 58' |
| HK | 2 | Juan Anaya Lazaro | | (substituted off) 63' |
| LP | 1 | Jean-Baptiste Custoja | | (substituted off) 50' | (substituted on) 58' | (substituted off) 67' |
Replacements:
| PR | 16 | Fernando Martin López Perez | (yellow card) 56' to 66' | (substituted on) 50' |
| HK | 17 | Dani Marrón | | (substituted on) 63' |
| PR | 18 | Alberto Blanco | | (substituted on) 58' |
| LK | 19 | Manuel Mora Ruiz | | (substituted on) 63' |
| FL | 20 | Lucas Guillaume | | (substituted on) 59' |
| SH | 21 | Facundo Munilla | | (substituted on) 79' |
| WG | 22 | Brice Labadie | | (substituted on) 54' |
| N8 | 23 | Afa Tauli | | (substituted on) 50' |
Coach:
(Spain) Santiago Santos

Touch judges:
URU Appt. (Uruguay)
URU Appt. (Uruguay)

== See also ==
- World Rugby Nations Cup
- 2017 mid-year rugby union internationals
