= List of 2017–18 Pro14 transfers =

This is a list of player transfers involving Pro14 teams before or during the 2017–18 season.

== Benetton ==
=== Players In ===
- (Italy) Sebastian Negri from (England) Hartpury College
- (Argentina) Juan Ignacio Brex from (Italy) Viadana
- (Italy) Andrea Bronzini from (Italy) Viadana
- (New Zealand) Marty Banks from (New Zealand) Highlanders
- (Italy) Federico Ruzza from (Italy) Zebre
- (New Zealand) Nasi Manu from (Scotland) Edinburgh
- (New Zealand) Whetu Douglas from (New Zealand) Crusaders
- (Italy) Marco Riccioni from (Italy) Calvisano
- (South Africa) Irné Herbst from (South Africa) Southern Kings
- (Italy) Engjel Makelara from (Italy) Petrarca
- (Argentina) Tomás Baravalle from (Argentina) Jockey
- (New Zealand) Hame Faiva from (New Zealand) Waikato
- (New Zealand) Monty Ioane from (New Zealand) Bay of Planty Steamers

=== Players Out ===
- (Italy) Roberto Santamaria to (Italy) Petrarca
- (Italy) Guglielmo Zanini to (Italy) Rovigo Delta
- (Italy) Luke McLean to (England) London Irish
- (Samoa) Filo Paulo to (England) London Irish
- (Italy) Filippo Gerosa to (Italy) Petrarca
- (Italy) Andrea Pratichetti to (Italy) Amatori San Donà
- (Italy) David Odiete to (Italy) Rovigo Delta
- (Italy) Davide Giazzon to (Italy) Mogliano
- (Italy) Jean-François Montauriol to (Italy) I Medicei Firenze
- (Argentina) Alberto Rolando Porolli to (Argentina) Newman
- (Italy) Andrea Buondonno to (Italy) Mogliano

== Cardiff Blues ==
=== Players In ===
- (Wales) Jack Roberts from (England) Leicester Tigers
- (England) Damian Welch from (England) Exeter Chiefs
- (Wales) Sion Bennett from (England) Northampton Saints
- (England) Olly Robinson from (England) Bristol (short-term loan subsequently made permanent.)

=== Players Out ===
- (Wales) Cory Allen to (Wales) Ospreys
- (New Zealand) Jarrad Hoeata to (New Zealand) North Harbour
- (Wales) Marc Thomas to (England) Yorkshire Carnegie
- (Wales) Liam Belcher to (Wales) Dragons
- (South Africa) Franco van der Merwe to (England) London Irish
- (United States) Cam Dolan released
- (Samoa) Pele Cowley released
- (Wales) Scott Andrews to (England) Bath (one-month loan)

== Cheetahs ==
=== Players In ===
- Cecil Afrika from South Africa Sevens (loan)
- (South Africa) Rynier Bernardo from (Wales) Scarlets
- (South Africa) Craig Barry from (South Africa) Western Province (loan)
- (South Africa) AJ Coertzen from (South Africa) Griquas (loan)
- (South Africa) Luan de Bruin from (South Africa) Free State Cheetahs
- (South Africa) Erich de Jager from (South Africa) Free State Cheetahs
- (South Africa) Johan Goosen unattached
- (South Africa) Lloyd Greeff from (South Africa) Free State Cheetahs
- (South Africa) Malcolm Jaer from (South Africa) Southern Kings
- (South Africa) Günther Janse van Vuuren from (South Africa) Free State Cheetahs
- (South Africa) Johan Kotze from (South Africa) Free State Cheetahs
- (South Africa) Tertius Kruger from (South Africa) Griquas
- (South Africa) Daniel Maartens from (South Africa) Free State Cheetahs
- (South Africa) Makazole Mapimpi from (South Africa) Southern Kings
- (South Africa) Rabz Maxwane from (South Africa) Bulls
- (South Africa) Gerhard Olivier from (South Africa) Free State Cheetahs
- (South Africa) Robbie Petzer from (South Africa) Griffons
- (South Africa) JP Smith from (South Africa) Free State Cheetahs
- Rosko Specman from South Africa Sevens (loan)
- (South Africa) Ernst Stapelberg from (South Africa) Western Province
- (South Africa) Ntokozo Vidima from (South Africa) Free State Cheetahs
- (South Africa) Jasper Wiese from (South Africa) Free State Cheetahs
- (South Africa) Lihleli Xoli from (South Africa) Free State Cheetahs

=== Players Out ===
The Cheetahs joined the Pro14 for the 2017–18 season. For player departures prior to this season, see List of 2017–18 Super Rugby transfers#Cheetahs. The transfers below occurred during the season:

- Cecil Afrika to South Africa Sevens (loan return)
- (South Africa) Craig Barry to (South Africa) Stormers (loan return)
- (South Africa) Rayno Benjamin released
- Chris Dry to South Africa Sevens (loan return)
- (South Africa) Armandt Koster to (France) Grenoble
- (South Africa) Hilton Lobberts to (South Africa) Pumas
- (South Africa) Makazole Mapimpi to (South Africa) Sharks
- (South Africa) Sergeal Petersen to (South Africa) Stormers
- (South Africa) Robbie Petzer to (South Africa) SWD Eagles
- (South Africa) Raymond Rhule to (South Africa) Stormers
- (South Africa) JP Smith to (South Africa) Southern Kings
- Rosko Specman to South Africa Sevens (loan return)

== Connacht ==
=== Players In ===
- (Ireland) Gavin Thornbury from (New Zealand) Wanganui
- (Ireland) Cormac Brennan promoted from Academy
- (Ireland) Conor McKeon promoted from Academy
- (Ireland) Pat O'Toole promoted from Academy
- (England) James Mitchell from (England) Sale Sharks
- (Ireland) Peter McCabe from (Ireland) Munster
- (Australia) Jarrad Butler from (Australia) Brumbies
- (Australia) Andrew Deegan from (Australia) Waratahs
- (Ireland) Rory Scholes from (Scotland) Edinburgh
- (Ireland) Denis Coulson from (France) Grenoble
- (New Zealand) Pita Ahki from (New Zealand) Hurricanes

=== Players Out ===
- (Ireland) John Cooney to (Ireland) Ulster
- (Ireland) Ben Marshall retired
- (Ireland) Danny Qualter to (England) Nottingham
- (Ireland) Ciaran Gaffney to (Italy) Zebre
- (Ireland) Rory Moloney to (New Zealand) Thames Valley
- (Canada) Shane O'Leary to (England) Ealing Trailfinders
- (Ireland) Rory Parata to (New Zealand) Otago
- (New Zealand) Nepia Fox-Matamua to (New Zealand) Ponsonby
- (Ireland) Ronan Loughney retired
- (South Africa) Danie Poolman to (Ireland) Buccaneers
- Josh Rowland to Ireland Sevens
- (Ireland) Ivan Soroka to (Ireland) Clontarf
- (Ireland) Lewis Stevenson to (Ireland) Bangor
- (South Africa) Marnitz Boshoff to (South Africa) Blue Bulls

== Dragons ==
=== Players In ===
- (South Africa) Zane Kirchner from (Ireland) Leinster
- (Wales) Gavin Henson from (England) Bristol
- (Wales) Liam Belcher from (Wales) Cardiff Blues
- (England) Gerard Ellis from (England) London Irish
- (Wales) Dan Suter from (Wales) Ospreys
- (United States) Thretton Palamo from (England) Bristol (short-term loan)
- (Wales) Calvin Wellington from (England) St Helens
- (South Africa) Jarryd Sage from (South Africa) Southern Kings
- (Wales) Nicky Thomas from (Wales) Scarlets (short-term loan)

=== Players Out ===
- (England) Shaun Knight to (England) Bath
- (Wales) Tom Prydie to (Wales) Scarlets
- (Wales) Geraint Rhys Jones to (Wales) Scarlets
- (New Zealand) Nick Crosswell to (New Zealand) Manawatu
- (Wales) T. Rhys Thomas retired
- (Wales) Darran Harris to (Wales) Merthyr
- (Wales) Craig Mitchell released

== Edinburgh ==
=== Players In ===
- (Scotland) Mark Bennett from (Scotland) Glasgow Warriors
- (Scotland) Murray McCallum promoted from Academy
- (Scotland) Callum Hunter-Hill promoted from Academy
- (Scotland) Ally Miller promoted from Academy
- (Scotland) Hugh Fraser promoted from Academy
- (Scotland) Tom Galbraith promoted from Academy
- (Scotland) Darcy Graham promoted from Academy
- (New Zealand) Robbie Fruean from (England) Bath
- (South Africa) Duhan van der Merwe from (France) Montpellier
- (Wales) Jason Harries from (England) London Scottish
- (England) Darryl Marfo from (England) Bath
- (Scotland) Cameron Fenton from (Scotland) Glasgow Hawks

=== Players Out ===
- (Scotland) Jack Cosgrove to (England) Bristol
- (New Zealand) Nasi Manu to (Italy) Benetton
- (Ireland) Michael Allen retired
- (Australia) Sasa Tofilau to (France) Massy
- (Tonga) Will Helu to (Romania) Timișoara Saracens
- (Scotland) George Turner to (Scotland) Glasgow Warriors (season-loan)
- (Ireland) Rory Scholes to (Ireland) Connacht
- (Scotland) Nick Beavon to (Scotland) Melrose
- (South Africa) Kyle Whyte to (Scotland) Watsonians
- (Scotland) Jake Kerr to (England) Leicester Tigers
- (Namibia) Anton Bresler to (England) Worcester Warriors
- (Australia) Alex Northam released
- (Tonga) Viliami Fihaki released

== Glasgow Warriors ==
=== Players In ===
- (Scotland) Lewis Wynne promoted from Academy
- (Scotland) Matt Smith promoted from Academy
- (Scotland) Huw Jones from (South Africa) Stormers
- (South Africa) Oli Kebble from (South Africa) Stormers
- (New Zealand) Callum Gibbins from (New Zealand) Hurricanes
- (Scotland) Jamie Bhatti promoted from Academy
- (Scotland) Adam Hastings from (England) Bath
- (Scotland) George Horne promoted from Academy
- (Scotland) Paddy Kelly promoted from Academy
- (New Zealand) Lelia Masaga from (New Zealand) Chiefs
- (Italy) Samuela Vunisa from (England) Saracens
- (Scotland) Kiran McDonald from (England) Hull
- (South Africa) Brandon Thomson from (South Africa) Stormers
- (Tonga) Siosiua Halanukonuka from (New Zealand) Highlanders
- (Scotland) Ruaridh Jackson from (England) Harlequins
- (Scotland) George Turner from (Scotland) Edinburgh (season-loan)
- (Fiji) Nikola Matawalu from (England) Exeter Chiefs
- (Scotland) Ryan Grant from (England) Worcester Warriors

=== Players Out ===
- (Tonga) Sila Puafisi to (France) Brive
- (Scotland) Mark Bennett to (Scotland) Edinburgh
- (England) Rory Clegg to (England) Ealing Trailfinders
- (Scotland) Josh Strauss to (England) Sale Sharks
- (Scotland) Gordon Reid to (England) London Irish
- (Scotland) Sean Lamont retired
- (Scotland) Grayson Hart to (England) Ealing Trailfinders
- (Scotland) Junior Bulumakau to (England) Doncaster Knights
- (Scotland) Peter Murchie retired
- (Namibia) Tijuee Uanivi to (England) London Scottish
- (Scotland) Fraser Lyle to (England) London Scottish
- (Scotland) Hagen Schulte to (Germany) Heidelberger RK
- (Fiji) Nemia Kenatale released

== Leinster ==
=== Players In ===
- (Australia) Scott Fardy from (Australia) Brumbies
- (New Zealand) James Lowe from (New Zealand) Chiefs
- (Ireland) Andrew Porter promoted from Academy
- (Ireland) Ross Byrne promoted from Academy
- (Ireland) Joey Carbery promoted from Academy
- (Ireland) Nick McCarthy promoted from Academy
- (Ireland) Rory O'Loughlin promoted from Academy
- (Ireland) Peadar Timmins promoted from Academy
- (Ireland) James Ryan promoted from Academy

=== Players Out ===
- (South Africa) Zane Kirchner to (Wales) Dragons
- (Ireland) Mike Ross retired
- (New Zealand) Hayden Triggs retired
- (Ireland) Mike McCarthy retired
- (Ireland) Dominic Ryan to (England) Leicester Tigers
- (Ireland) Jeremy Loughman to (Ireland) Munster (loan)

== Munster ==
=== Players In ===
- (Ireland) Chris Farrell from (France) Grenoble
- (Ireland) JJ Hanrahan from (England) Northampton Saints
- (Ireland) James Hart from (France) Racing 92
- (Ireland) Brian Scott promoted from Academy
- (Ireland) Conor Oliver promoted from Academy
- (Ireland) Bill Johnston promoted from Academy
- (Ireland) Dan Goggin promoted from Academy
- (Ireland) Stephen Fitzgerald promoted from Academy
- (South Africa) Chris Cloete from (South Africa) Southern Kings/Pumas
- (South Africa) Gerbrandt Grobler from (France) Racing 92
- (England) Ciaran Parker from (England) Sale Sharks
- (Ireland) Mark Flanagan from (England) Saracens (three-month loan)
- (Ireland) Jeremy Loughman from (Ireland) Leinster (three-month loan)

=== Players Out ===
- (Ireland) Dave Foley to (France) Pau
- (Ireland) Cian Bohane retired
- (Ireland) Rory Burke to (England) Nottingham
- (Australia) Mark Chisholm retired
- (Ireland) Donnacha Ryan to (France) Racing 92
- (Ireland) John Madigan to (France) Massy
- (Ireland) Peter McCabe to (Ireland) Connacht
- (New Zealand) Francis Saili to (England) Harlequins

== Ospreys ==
=== Players In ===
- (Wales) James Hook from (England) Gloucester
- (Wales) Cory Allen from (Wales) Cardiff Blues
- (South Africa) Brian Mujati from (England) Sale Sharks
- Sam Cross from Wales Sevens
- (England) Guy Mercer from (England) Bath (season-loan)

=== Players Out ===
- (England) Sam Underhill to (England) Bath
- (England) Tom O'Flaherty to (England) Exeter Chiefs
- (Fiji) Josh Matavesi to (England) Newcastle Falcons
- (England) Joe Bearman to (Wales) Merthyr
- (Wales) Jonathan Spratt retired
- (Canada) Tyler Ardron to (New Zealand) Chiefs
- (Wales) Tom Grabham to (Wales) Scarlets
- (Wales) Dan Suter to (Wales) Dragons

== Scarlets ==
=== Players In ===
- (Australia) Paul Asquith from (Australia) Greater Sydney Rams
- (Wales) Tom Prydie from (Wales) Dragons
- (Wales) Geraint Rhys Jones from (Wales) Dragons
- (Wales) Tom Grabham from (Wales) Ospreys
- Morgan Williams from Wales Sevens
- (Wales) Leigh Halfpenny from (France) Toulon
- (Australia) Steve Cummins from (Australia) Melbourne Rebels

=== Players Out ===
- (Wales) Liam Williams to (England) Saracens
- (Canada) D. T. H. van der Merwe to (England) Newcastle Falcons
- (England) Peter Edwards to (Wales) Merthyr
- (Wales) Richard Smith to (Wales) Neath
- (Wales) Aled Thomas retired
- (Wales) Morgan Allen to (Wales) Bedwas
- (Wales) Gareth Owen to (England) Leicester Tigers
- (Wales) Matthew Owen to (Wales) Carmarthen Quins
- (South Africa) Rynier Bernardo to (South Africa) Cheetahs
- (Wales) Nicky Thomas to (Wales) Dragons (short-term loan)

== Southern Kings ==
=== Players In ===
- (South Africa) Lusanda Badiyana from (South Africa) Eastern Province Kings
- (South Africa) Eital Bredenkamp from (South Africa) Western Province
- (South Africa) Tienie Burger from (South Africa) Free State Cheetahs
- (South Africa) Stephan Coetzee from (South Africa) Sharks
- (South Africa) Kurt Coleman from (South Africa) Stormers
- (South Africa) Rossouw de Klerk from (France) Colomiers
- (South Africa) Bobby de Wee from (South Africa) Golden Lions
- (South Africa) Martin du Toit from (South Africa) SWD Eagles
- (South Africa) Martin Dreyer from (South Africa) Bulls
- (South Africa) Rowan Gouws from (South Africa) Sharks
- (South Africa) Stephan Greeff from (South Africa) Pumas
- (South Africa) Njabulo Gumede from (South Africa) Blue Bulls
- (South Africa) Benhard Janse van Rensburg from (South Africa) Sharks (loan)
- (South Africa) Harlon Klaasen from (South Africa) Western Province
- (South Africa) Khaya Majola from (South Africa) Sharks
- (South Africa) Michael Makase from (South Africa) Border Bulldogs
- (South Africa) Godlen Masimla from (South Africa) Stormers
- (South Africa) Siya Mdaka from (South Africa) Border Bulldogs
- (South Africa) Jacques Nel from (South Africa) Lions
- (South Africa) Freddy Ngoza from (South Africa) Blue Bulls
- (South Africa) Luvuyo Pupuma from (South Africa) Golden Lions
- (South Africa) JC Roos from (Japan) Canon Eagles
- (South Africa) Jarryd Sage from (South Africa) Golden Lions
- (South Africa) Pieter Scholtz from (South Africa) Pumas
- (South Africa) Victor Sekekete from (South Africa) Golden Lions
- (South Africa) S'bura Sithole from (South Africa) Sharks
- (South Africa) Joe Smith from (South Africa) Leopards
- (South Africa) JP Smith from (South Africa) Cheetahs
- (South Africa) Piet-Louw Strauss from (South Africa) Western Province
- (South Africa) Entienne Swanepoel from (France) Stade Français
- (South Africa) Alandré van Rooyen from (South Africa) Blue Bulls
- (Italy) Dries van Schalkwyk from (Italy) Zebre
- (South Africa) Jurie van Vuuren from (South Africa) Western Province
- (South Africa) Anthony Volmink from (South Africa) Lions
- (South Africa) Lindokuhle Welemu from (South Africa) Border Bulldogs
- (South Africa) Oliver Zono from (South Africa) Border Bulldogs

=== Players Out ===
The Kings joined the Pro14 for the 2017–18 season. For player departures prior to this season, see List of 2017–18 Super Rugby transfers#Kings. The transfers below occurred during the season:

- (South Africa) Pieter-Steyn de Wet to (South Africa) Griquas
- (South Africa) Benhard Janse van Rensburg to (South Africa) Sharks (loan return)
- (South Africa) Mzamo Majola to (South Africa) Sharks (loan return)
- (South Africa) Jarryd Sage to (Wales) Dragons

== Ulster ==
=== Players In ===
- (Ireland) John Cooney from (Ireland) Connacht
- (South Africa) Schalk van der Merwe from (South Africa) Southern Kings
- (South Africa) Jean Deysel from (South Africa) Sharks
- (Ireland) David Busby promoted from Academy
- (Ireland) Aaron Cairns promoted from Academy
- (Ireland) Ross Kane promoted from Academy
- (Ireland) Rob Lyttle promoted from Academy
- (Ireland) Tommy O'Hagan promoted from Academy
- (Ireland) Jack Owens promoted from Academy
- (Australia) Christian Lealiifano from (Australia) Brumbies

=== Players Out ===
- (Ireland) Roger Wilson retired
- (Ireland) Conor Joyce to (England) Jersey Reds
- (Ireland) Mark Best to (England) Jersey Reds
- (Ireland) Jonny Murphy to (England) Rotherham Titans
- (South Africa) Ruan Pienaar to (France) Montpellier
- (Ireland) John Donnan released
- (Ireland) Lorcan Dow released
- (Ireland) Ricky Lutton released
- (Ireland) Stephen Mulholland released

== Zebre ==
=== Players In ===
- (Italy) Roberto Tenga from (Italy) Fiamme Oro
- (Italy) Renato Giammarioli from (Italy) Calvisano
- (Italy) Matteo Minozzi from (Italy) Calvisano
- (Italy) Luhandre Luus from (Italy) Calvisano
- (Italy) Sami Panico from (Italy) Calvisano
- (Italy) Maicol Azzolini from (Italy) Fiamme Oro
- (Italy) Leonard Krumov from (Italy) Viadana
- (Italy) Riccardo Raffaele from (Italy) Calvisano
- (England) Dave Sisi from (England) Bath
- (Ireland) Ciaran Gaffney from (Ireland) Connacht
- (Argentina) Eduardo Bello from (Argentina) Atlético de Rosario
- (Australia) Cruze Ah-Nau from (Australia) Melbourne Rebels
- (New Zealand) James Tucker from (New Zealand) Waikato
- (Italy) Edoardo Padovani from (France) Toulon
- (Ireland) Rory Parata from (New Zealand) Otago

=== Players Out ===
- (Italy) Quintin Geldenhuys retired
- (Italy) Federico Ruzza to (Italy) Benetton
- (Italy) Pietro Ceccarelli to (France) Oyonnax
- (Italy) Edoardo Padovani to (France) Toulon
- (Italy) Joshua Furno to (New Zealand) Otago
- (South Africa) Kayle van Zyl to (Italy) Amatori San Donà
- (Argentina) Guillermo Roan to (Argentina) La Plata
- (South Africa) Lloyd Greeff to (South Africa) Free State Cheetahs
- (Italy) Dries van Schalkwyk to (South Africa) Southern Kings
- (New Zealand) Kurt Baker to (New Zealand) Manawatu
- (South Africa) Gideon Koegelenberg to (South Africa) Sharks
- (South Africa) Bart le Roux to (South Africa) Eastern Province Kings
- (Argentina) Bruno Postiglioni to (Spain) Gernika
- (South Africa) Sidney Tobias to (South Africa) Rustenburg Impala
- (New Zealand) Dion Berryman released
- (South Africa) Carlo Engelbrecht released

== See also ==
- List of 2017–18 Premiership Rugby transfers
- List of 2017–18 RFU Championship transfers
- List of 2017–18 Super Rugby transfers
- List of 2017–18 Top 14 transfers
