= Esteban Meneses =

Argentine rugby union head coach

- Born: 13 April 1972 (age 54) La Plata, Buenos Aires Province, Argentina
- Height: 6 ft 2 in (1.88 m)
- Weight: 216 lb (98 kg)

Rugby union career
- Position: Flanker
Amateur team(s)
Years	Team	Apps	(Points)
1992–1999	La Plata		
Senior career
Years	Team	Apps	(Points)
1999–2001	Calvisano		
2001–2003	Amatori Alghero		
2003–2005	La Plata		
Coaching career
- Years: Team
- 2009–2011: La Plata
- 2012–2013: URBA U17
- 2012: URBA U19
- 2013–2014: La Plata U20
- 2015: C.U.B.A.
- 2015–2023: Uruguay
- 2024–: Portugal (assistant coach)
- Correct as of 11 January 2024

Professor Esteban Meneses (born 13 April 1972), is an Argentine rugby union head coach and former player.

== Playing ==
Meneses, born in La Plata, played for his local team for most of his playing career. Starting out in the junior section at his club La Plata at a young age, Meneses moved through the ranks to senior rugby in 1992. He was part of the La Plata team that won the last URBA Championship organised by the national union before it became a regional competition, and helped his side to second place in the Nacional de Clubes competition.

In 1999, Meneses signed with Italian side Calvisano, which saw him play second tier European Rugby during the 1999–2000 European Challenge Cup. He remained in Italy for three more years, moving to Amatori Alghero in the 2001–2002 season, before returning home to La Plata a season later where he became captain in 2004. After another season at the helm, he retired at the end of the 2005 season after playing senior rugby for over a decade for his local club, and a four-year stint in Europe.

== Coaching ==
After retiring from playing in 2005, Meneses became a coach at La Plata, initially with the junior section before becoming joint coach with Agustín Carrara with the senior side in 2009. In just their first season in charge, they led La Plata to third in the URBA Championship, before going one step further in 2010 to runner-up, behind San Isidro. Between 2012 and 2014 Meneses coached age-grade teams for the URBA Provence, at under-17 and under-19 level. In 2015 he was given a chance to be a professional coach at C.U.B.A., who play in the top flight division in Argentina. He led the side to second in the URBA Championship, despite the side winning the Nacional de Clubes competition in 2014.

=== Uruguay ===
In December 2015, Meneses was unveiled as the new head coach for the Uruguayan national team, replacing Pablo Lemoine who had been in charge since 2012. Meneses joined the Uruguayan Rugby Union as a direct recommendation from the then Argentine head coach, Daniel Hourcade. Meneses would lead Uruguay into a new era, after the union was granted promotion to Tier 2 status, having been a Tier 3 nation since the tiered system had been introduced.

His first match in charge was against Canada in the inaugural 2016 Americas Rugby Championship, which Canada won 33–17. Meneses gained his first victory a week later in São Paulo, defeating Brazil 33–29. After narrowly losing to Argentina XV 24–21 in Round 3, Uruguay went back-to-back for the first time under Meneses, defeating Chile 23–20, before knocking over the United States, for the first time since 2002, 29–25, to finish fourth overall. Uruguay continued this form into the 2016 South American Rugby Championship "A", winning all three matches to reclaim the South American Rugby Championship title they had lost the previous year to Chile. This meant their secured a position in the 2016 Sudamérica Rugby Cup, finishing second behind Argentina, who they had lost to 18–8 in round 2.

During the 2016 World Rugby Nations Cup, Uruguay struggled to put together a consistent form, after narrowly losing in the opening round to Emerging Italy 26–24 and being completely outranked by eventual champions Romania 40–0 in round 2. Had it not been for a 16–0 victory over Spain in the final round, Uruguay would have finished bottom for the first time since their appearance in 2008. The 2016 November test window saw Uruguay tour Europe for their first ever 3-test tour, which saw Uruguay lose all three tests; Germany (24–21), Spain (33–16) and Romania (36–10).

2017 was an important year for Uruguay, as it was 2019 Rugby World Cup Americas Qualification year for the leading nations in the Americas. The year started promising, with an improved Americas Rugby Championship campaign, finishing third with wins over Brazil, Chile and a first win over Canada since 2002. However the result in the 2017 South American Rugby Championship "A" was the all-important Qualification tournament, and with three successful victories over the participating nations, Brazil, Chile and Paraguay, Uruguay advanced to the Americas Repechage play-offs against Canada.

In June 2017, the 2017 World Rugby Nations Cup was held outside Romania for the first time, with Uruguay as hosts. The home advantage proved successful, with Meneses leading Uruguay to Champions for the first time; after they defeated Emerging Italy 30–21, Russia 32–29 and Spain 24–14. Their form continued into the 2017 November tests, with a 2–0 series win over Namibia. The first test was a record 52–36 win, however Namibia were a stronger force in the second test, only narrowly losing to Uruguay 39–34.

In February 2018, Meneses led his team to 2019 Rugby World Cup qualification, after successfully beating Canada 2–0 over a two-leg qualification play-off, 70–60 on aggregate. The 38–29 victory in Canada, was the first time Uruguay had beaten Canada in Canada. Following this, Uruguay maintained their third-place finish in the 2018 Americas Rugby Championship, with defeats to Argentina XV and the United States, and later went onto retain the 2018 World Rugby Nations Cup in June that year. The 2018 November test window saw Uruguay win one lose one during the tour; defeating Romania 27–20, whilst losing to Fiji 68–7.

During the 2019 Americas Rugby Championship, Uruguay recorded their best ever finished of second in the Championship. This came with Uruguay defeating all but one team - Champions Argentina XV - during the Championship, including a victory over the United States in Tukwila, Washington. Uruguay continued this form into the 2019 World Rugby Nations Cup, taking away the title for the third consecutive year. However, in an additional Rugby World Cup warm-up match against Spain, Spain recorded their largest winning victory over Los Teros, winning 41–21.

During the 2019 Rugby World Cup, Meneses coached Uruguay to their first Rugby World Cup win since 2003, defeating Fiji 30–27, in what was also Uruguay's first win over any of the Pacific Island nations. Despite the historic victory, Uruguay went onto lose all their remaining matches at the World Cup. Two years later, Meneses secured qualification for the 2023 Rugby World Cup as Americas 1 after an historic record win over the United States, the first time they have qualified as the leading Americas team (excluding Argentina). During that campaign, Uruguay finished fourth in their group, their pest positioning since 2003, with a victory over Namibia. They also held hosts France to a 27–12 defeat, despite being within one score for 75 minutes of the game.

Menses stood down as head coach following the 2023 Rugby World Cup, and in January 2024, became an assistant coach for Portugal.

== Honours ==
Uruguay

- Americas Rugby Championship
  - Runners-up: 2019
  - Third: 2017, 2018
- South American Rugby Championship
  - Winners: 2016, 2017, 2021
  - Runners Up: 2015
- Sudamérica Rugby Cup
  - Runners Up: 2016, 2017
- World Rugby Nations Cup
  - Winners: 2017, 2018, 2019

La Plata

- URBA Championship
  - Winner: 1995 (as a player)
  - Runners Up: 2010 (as a coach)

C.U.B.A.

- URBA Championship
  - Runners Up: 2015

Sporting positions
Preceded by (Uruguay) Pablo Lemoine	Uruguay National Rugby Union Coach; 2015–2023	Succeeded by (Argentina) Rodolfo Ambrosio
