= Andrea Menniti Ippolito =

Italian rugby union player

- Born: 25 August 1992 (age 34) Camposampiero, Italy
- Height: 1.87 m (6 ft 2 in)
- Weight: 87 kg (192 lb; 13 st 10 lb)

Rugby union career
- Position: Fly-Half
- Current team: Fiamme Oro
Youth career
- Rubano
Senior career
| Years | Team | Apps | (Points) |
| 2011−2012 | Rubano | | |
| 2012−2019 | Petrarca Padova | 132 | (696) |
| 2014 | →Benetton Treviso | 1 | (0) |
| 2019−2021 | Rovigo Delta | 26 | (294) |
| 2021− | Fiamme Oro | | |
- Correct as of 7 June 2020
International career
| Years | Team | Apps | (Points) |
| 2016−2018 | Emerging Italy | 5 | (9) |
- Correct as of 7 June 2020

Andrea Menniti Ippolito (Camposampiero, 25 August 1992) is an Italian rugby union player. His usual position is as a Fly-Half and he currently plays for Fiamme Oro in Top10 after the experience with Rovigo Delta.

For 2013–14 Pro12 season, he named like Additional Player for Benetton Treviso in Pro 12.

In 2016 and 2018 Menniti Ippolito was named in the Emerging Italy squad for annual World Rugby Nations Cup.
