= Damiano Borean =

Italian rugby union player

- Born: 12 January 1997 (age 29) San Vito al Tagliamento, Italy
- Height: 1.87 m (6 ft 2 in)
- Weight: 110 kg (17 st 5 lb; 243 lb)

Rugby union career
- Position: Prop
- Current team: Mogliano Veneto
Senior career
Years	Team	Apps	(Points)
2015−2016	San Donà	7	(5)
2016−2024	Petrarca Padova	110	(15)
2019	→Benetton	1	(0)
2024−	Mogliano Veneto		
- Correct as of 21 May 2020
International career
Years	Team	Apps	(Points)
2016	Italy Under 20	8	(0)
2018−2021	Italy A	3	(0)
- Correct as of 1 November 2021

Damiano Borean (born 12 January 1997) is an Italian rugby union player. His usual position is as a Prop and he currently plays for Mogliano Veneto in Serie A Elite.

Under contract with Top12 Petrarca Padova, for 2019–20 Pro14 season, he named like Additional Player for Benetton. He played with Petrarca Padova until summer 2024.

After playing for Italy Under 20 in 2016, in 2018 and 2021 Borean was named in the Emerging Italy squad for the World Rugby Nations Cup and for 2021 end-of-year rugby union internationals. On 14 October 2021, he was selected by Alessandro Troncon to be part of an Italy A 28-man squad for the 2021 end-of-year rugby union internationals.
