= Matteo Drudi =

Italian rugby union player

- Born: 30 September 2000 (age 26) Rome, Italy
- Height: 1.84 m (6 ft 1/2 in)
- Weight: 113 kg (17.8 st; 249 lb)

Rugby union career
- Position: Prop
- Current team: Fiamme oro
Youth career
- Tivoli Rugby
Senior career
Years	Team	Apps	(Points)
2018−2020	F.I.R. Academy		
2020–2022	Mogliano	10	(10)
2022	→ Benetton Rugby	4	(0)
2022−2023	Benetton Rugby	0	(0)
2023−	Fiamme Oro	0	(0)
- Correct as of 10 Apr 2022
International career
Years	Team	Apps	(Points)
2019–2020	Italy U20	13	(15)
- Correct as of 20 Feb 2022

Matteo Drudi (born 30 September 2000) is an Italian rugby union player, currently playing for Italian Serie A Elite side Fiamme oro. His preferred position is Prop.

Under contract with Mogliano in Top10, Drudi signed for Benetton as a Permit player in June 2020 for 2019 and 2022 seasons. He made his debut for Benetton in Round 12 of the 2021–22 United Rugby Championship against Glasgow Warriors. He played for Benetton in the United Rugby Championship until 2022−23 season.

In 2019 and 2020, Drudi was named in the Italy Under 20 squad.
