= Enrico Lucchin =

Italy international rugby union player

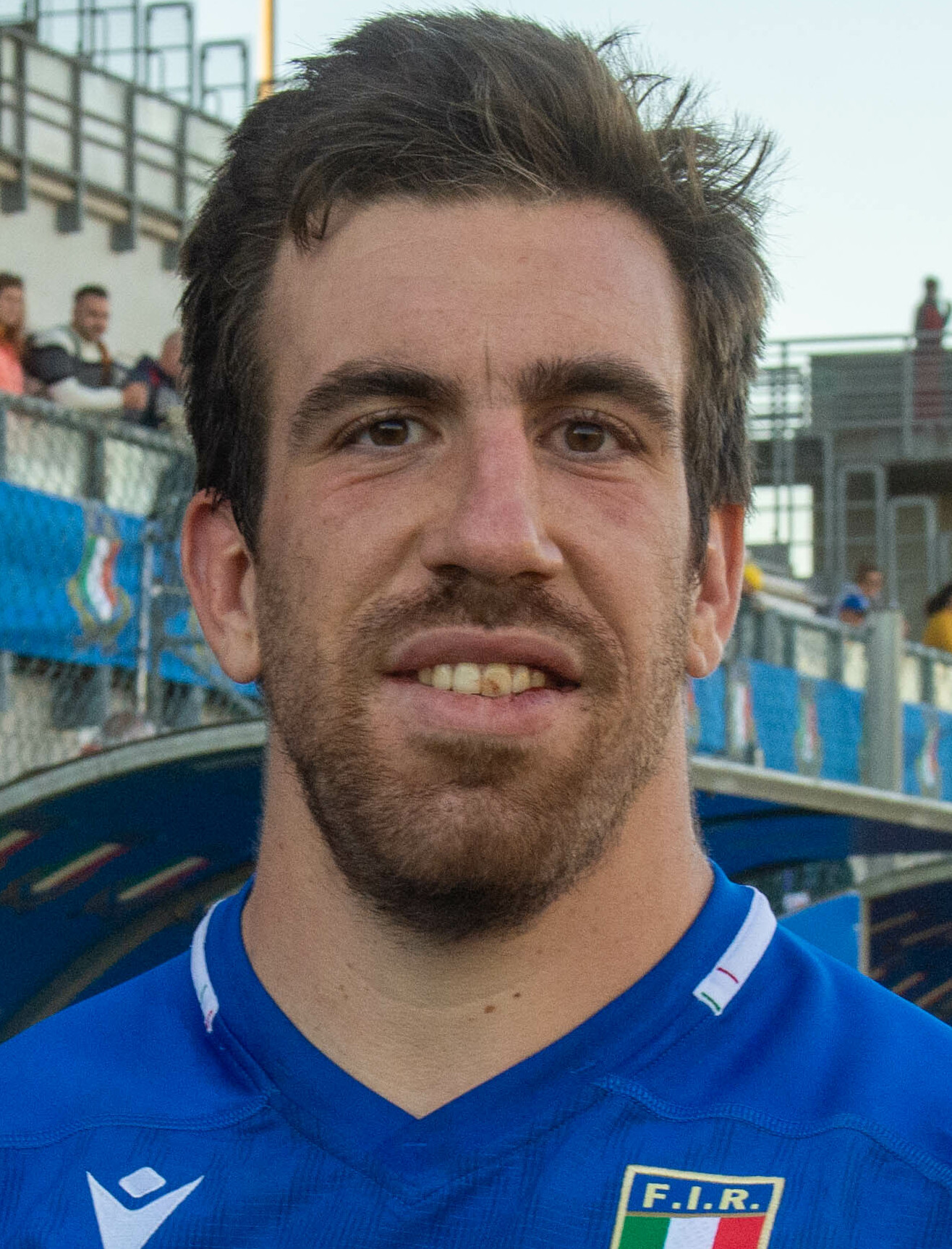
- Lucchin in 2022
- Born: 4 April 1995 (age 31) Adria, Italy
- Height: 186 cm (6 ft 1 in)
- Weight: 103 kg (227 lb; 16 st 3 lb)
- School: Liceo Paleocapa

Rugby union career
- Position: Centre
- Current team: Zebre Parma
Youth career
- F.I.R. Academy
Senior career
| Years | Team | Apps | (Points) |
| 2015 | Mogliano | 2 | (5) |
| 2015–2016 | Rovigo | 10 | (15) |
| 2016–2019 | Calvisano | 43 | (55) |
| 2019–2026 | Zebre Parma | 83 | (20) |
- Correct as of 2 June 2025
International career
| Years | Team | Apps | (Points) |
| 2015 | Italy U20 | 9 | (0) |
| 2016–2017 | Emerging Italy | 5 | (6) |
| 2022 | Italy A | 1 | (5) |
| 2022–2026 | Italy | 1 | (0) |
- Correct as of 6 November 2022

Enrico Lucchin (Italian pronunciation: [lukˈkin]; born 4 April 1995) is an Italian professional rugby union player who primarily plays centre for Zebre Parma of the United Rugby Championship.

== Professional career ==
Lucchin has previously played for clubs such as Mogliano, Rovigo, and Calvisano in the past.

In 2015, Lucchin was named in the Italy Under 20 squad and in 2016 and 2017 he was named in the Emerging Italy squad. On 14 October 2021, he was selected by Alessandro Troncon to be part of an Italy A 28-man squad for the 2021 end-of-year rugby union internationals. On 10 October 2022, he was selected by Kieran Crowley to be part of an Italy 33-man squad for the 2022 November Internationals matches against He made his debut against Samoa.
