= Matteo Corazzi =

Italian rugby union player

- Born: 10 September 1994 (age 32)
- Height: 1.85 m (6 ft 1 in)
- Weight: 87 kg (192 lb; 13 st 10 lb)

Rugby union career
- Position: Flanker
- Current team: Mogliano
Youth career
- Mogliano
Senior career
Years	Team	Apps	(Points)
2013−2021	Mogliano	102	(65)
- Correct as of 8 November 2020
International career
Years	Team	Apps	(Points)
2015−2017	Emerging Italy	7	(0)
- Correct as of 8 November 2020

Matteo Corazzi (born 10 September 1994) is an Italian rugby union player. His usual position is as a Flanker.

He played for Mogliano in Top12 from 2013 to 2021.

From 2015 to 2017 Corazzi was named in the Emerging Italy squad for the annual World Rugby Nations Cup.
