= Jody Rossetto =

- Born: 11 January 1995 (age 31) Vittorio Veneto, Italy
- Height: 1.90 m (6 ft 3 in)
- Weight: 136 kg (300 lb; 21 st 6 lb)

Rugby union career
- Position: Prop
Youth career
- Rugby Piave
Senior career
Years	Team	Apps	(Points)
2013−2015	F.I.R. Academy		
2015−2020	Petrarca Padova	53	(5)
2017	→Benetton	1	(0)
- Correct as of 7 June 2020
International career
Years	Team	Apps	(Points)
2018	Emerging Italy	2	(0)
- Correct as of 7 June 2020

Jody Rossetto (11 January 1995) is a retired Italian rugby union player from Vittorio Veneto. His usual position was as a prop and he played for Petrarca Padova in Top12 until the 2019−2020 season.

For the 2016–17 Pro12 season, he was named additional player for Benetton.

In 2018 Rossetto was named in the Emerging Italy squad for the World Rugby Nations Cup.
