= Engjel Makelara =

Italian rugby union player (born 1996)

- Full name: Engjel Makelara
- Born: 22 August 1996 (age 30) Debar, Macedonia
- Height: 185 cm (6 ft 1 in)
- Weight: 102 kg (225 lb; 16 st 1 lb)

Rugby union career
- Position: Hooker
- Current team: Amatori Alghero
Senior career
Years	Team	Apps	(Points)
2014−2016	Mogliano	12	(5)
2016–2017	Petrarca	12	(5)
2017–2020	Benetton	25	(5)
2020–2023	Petrarca	24	(15)
2023–	Amatori Alghero		
International career
Years	Team	Apps	(Points)
2015−2016	Italy U20	11	(2)
2017	Emerging Italy	3	(0)

Engjel Makelara (Albanian: Engjëll Makelara; born 22 August 1996) is an Italian rugby union player for Amatori Alghero in the Serie A, and his preferred position is hooker.

== Career ==
Makelara was born on 22 August 1996 in Debar, Macedonia from Albanian parents, he began playing rugby at the age of 14, showing off right away also thanks to the prowess of her physique. After a couple of seasons spent with the yellow and red jersey of Bassano, the adventure begins with the youth of Benetton during which Makelara gets the call-up by the Italy U17 and wins the U16 championship in 2012 and U18 in 2014 and in that same year, he was part of the group selected for the Mogliano's Zonal Academy. He played for Benetton until 2019–20 Pro14 season.

From 2020 to 2023, he played for Petrarca in the Italian Top12.

In the summer of 2014, he received a call-up from the technical commissioner Alessandro Troncon for the summer tour of the Italy U20 in Ireland and after the call came, he injured and had to give up and then that of Mogliano, a club where he remains for two years in which he makes his debut in Excellence and is also selected for the Six Nations Under 20s Championship. On 4 February 2019, Makelara was named as part of the Italy squad for 2019 Six Nations to replace the injured Oliviero Fabiani.
