= Michele Mancini Parri =

Italian rugby union player

- Born: 13 May 1998 (age 28) Arezzo, Italy
- Height: 1.81 m (5 ft 11 in)
- Weight: 110 kg (243 lb; 17 st 5 lb)

Rugby union career
- Position: Prop
- Current team: Fiamme Oro
Youth career
- Vasari Arezzo
Senior career
Years	Team	Apps	(Points)
2017−2018	F.I.R. Academy		
2018−2022	Petrarca Padova	43	(15)
2019	→Benetton	4	(0)
2022−	Fiamme Oro		
- Correct as of 21 May 2020
International career
Years	Team	Apps	(Points)
2017−2018	Italy Under 20	11	(5)
- Correct as of 21 May 2020

Michele Mancini Parri (born 13 May 1998 in Arezzo) is an Italian rugby union player. His usual position is as a prop and he currently plays for Fiamme Oro in Top10.

Under contract with Petrarca Padova in Top12 until 2021−2022 season, for 2019–20 Pro14 season, he named as Permit Player for Benetton.

In 2017 and 2018, Mancini Parri was named in the Italy Under 20 squad.
