= Derrick Appiah =

Italian rugby union player

- Born: Derrick Appiah; 19 July 1994 (age 32) Modena, Italy
- Height: 1.85 m (6 ft 1 in)
- Weight: 118 kg (18 st 8 lb)

Rugby union career
- Position: Prop
Amateur team(s)
Years	Team	Apps	(Points)
- Modena
2010−2013	F.I.R. Academy		
Senior career
Years	Team	Apps	(Points)
2013–2015	Mogliano	29	(15)
2015–2017	Worcester Warriors	5	(5)
2016	→Nottingham	1	(0)
2016	→London Scottish	1	(0)
2017	→Edinburgh (loan)	5	(0)
2017−2018	London Scottish	21	(10)
2018−2021	Benetton	20	(5)
2021	→Mogliano	5	(0)
2021−	Colorno		
2022	→Northern Suburbs		
- Correct as of 26 Mar 2021
International career
Years	Team	Apps	(Points)
2014	Italy U20	10	(0)
2017−	Emerging Italy	3	(0)
- Correct as of 30 April 2018

Derrick Appiah (born 19 July 1994, in Modena) is an Italian rugby union player who plays for Italinan club Colorno in the Top10.

Appiah has featured for Mogliano in Italy's National Championship of Excellence and the Amlin Challenge Cup and has also enjoyed spells with Rugby Parma and Modena Rugby.

On 4 February 2015, Appiah made a move to England with Worcester Warriors in top level competition, which is the Aviva Premiership, starting from the 2015-16 season. On 5 May 2017, Appiah signs for RFU Championship outfit London Scottish ahead of the 2017-18 season. From 2018 to 2021, Appiah played with Italian Pro14 team Benetton.

The prop was a regular for Italy U20s during the 2014 RBS Junior Six Nations campaign, helping Italy to a 32-13 victory over Scotland and a fifth-place finish. Later that year, he helped Italy to a third-place pool finish during the 2014 IRB Junior World Championship - a campaign which saw his country defeat Argentina U20s 29-26. In 2017 he was named in the Emerging Italy squad.
