= Roberto Tenga =

Italian rugby union player

- Born: 25 January 1990 (age 36) Benevento, Italy
- Height: 1.84 m (6 ft 0 in)
- Weight: 90 kg (14 st 2 lb; 198 lb)

Rugby union career
- Position: Prop
- Current team: Zebre
Youth career
- Rugby San Giorgio
- –: Union Rugby Sannio
Senior career
Years	Team	Apps	(Points)
- Amatori Rugby Capoterra
2013−2014	I Cavalieri Prato	13	(2)
2014−2015	Pro Recco		
2015−2016	Rovigo Delta	18	(0)
2016−2017	Fiamme Oro	18	(0)
2017−2020	Zebre	28	(5)
2020−	Fiamme Oro		
- Correct as of 10 Jan 2020
International career
Years	Team	Apps	(Points)
2016−2017	Emerging Italy	6	(0)
- Correct as of 17 May 2020

Roberto Tenga (born 25 January 1990) is an Italian rugby union player. His usual position is as a Prop and he currently plays for Fiamme Oro in Top12.

Tenga played for Zebre from 2017 to 2020.

In 2016 and 2017, Tenga was named in the Emerging Italy squad for the 2016 World Rugby Nations Cup and 2017 World Rugby Nations Cup.
