= Luca Franceschetto =

Italian rugby union player (born 1999)

- Born: 7 June 1999 (age 27) Vicenza, Italy
- Height: 1.91 m (6 ft 3 in)
- Weight: 127 kg (20.0 st; 280 lb)

Rugby union career
- Position: Prop
- Current team: Zebre Parma
Youth career
- 2013–2018: Rangers Vicenza Rugby
Senior career
Years	Team	Apps	(Points)
2018–2019	F.I.R. Academy		
2019-2022	Petrarca Rugby		
2022-2024	Rugby Colorno		
2024-	Zebre Parma	13	(0)
- Correct as of 9 Aug 2026
International career
Years	Team	Apps	(Points)
2018−2019	Italy U20	7	(0)
2026	Italy XV	2	(0)
- Correct as of 7 Jun 2025

Luca Franceschetto (born 7 June 1999) is an Italian rugby union player, who plays for Zebre Parma in United Rugby Championship. His preferred position is prop.

== Career ==
Having started to play rugby at the age of 14 for the club of his city, Rangers Vicenza, he was selected to participate in the F.I.R. Academy starting from the 2018–2019 season.

In June 2019 he signs with Petrarca Padova in Top10, the top domestic league.

In 2022 he joins Rugby Colorno, where he stays for two seasons, until when he moves to Zebre Parma to play in URC.

He made his debut for Zebre from the bench on 26 January 2025 during Round 10 of the 2024–25 season in their away win against Ulster in Belfast.

== International career ==
Luca Franceschetto has participated in the 2018 Six Nations Under 20s Championship and 2018 World Rugby Under 20 Championship representing Italy.

On 28 January 2026 he was selected by Massimo Brunello to be part of an Italy XV squad for two official tests against Scotland A and Chile during 2026 men's rugby union internationals window of spring.
