= Alessandro Forcucci =

Italian rugby union player

- Born: 27 May 1998 (age 28) Popoli, Italy
- Height: 1.82 m (5 ft 11 1/2 in)
- Weight: 90 kg (200 lb; 14 st 2 lb)

Rugby union career
- Position: Centre
- Current team: Fiamme Oro
Youth career
- Sulmona Rugby
- –: L'Aquila
Senior career
Years	Team	Apps	(Points)
2017−2018	F.I.R. Academy		
2018−	Fiamme Oro	35	(20)
2020	→Zebre	1	(0)
- Correct as of 29 Dec 2020
International career
Years	Team	Apps	(Points)
2017–2018	Italy U20s	6	(15)
2026	Italy XV	1	(0)
- Correct as of 1 Dec 2020

Alessandro Forcucci (born 27 May 1998 in Popoli) is an Italian rugby union player, currently playing for Top12 side Fiamme Oro. He is also an additional player for the Pro14 side Zebre. His preferred position is flanker.

In 2017 and 2018, Forcucci was named in the Italy Under 20 squad. On 28 January 2026 he was selected by Massimo Brunello to be part of an Italy XV squad for two official tests against Scotland A and Chile during 2026 men's rugby union internationals window of spring.

== Zebre ==
Forcucci was named as an additional player in November 2020 for 2020–21 Pro14 season. He made his Zebre debut in Round 6 of the 2020–21 Pro14 against Munster.
