= Paolo Buonfiglio =

Italy international rugby union player

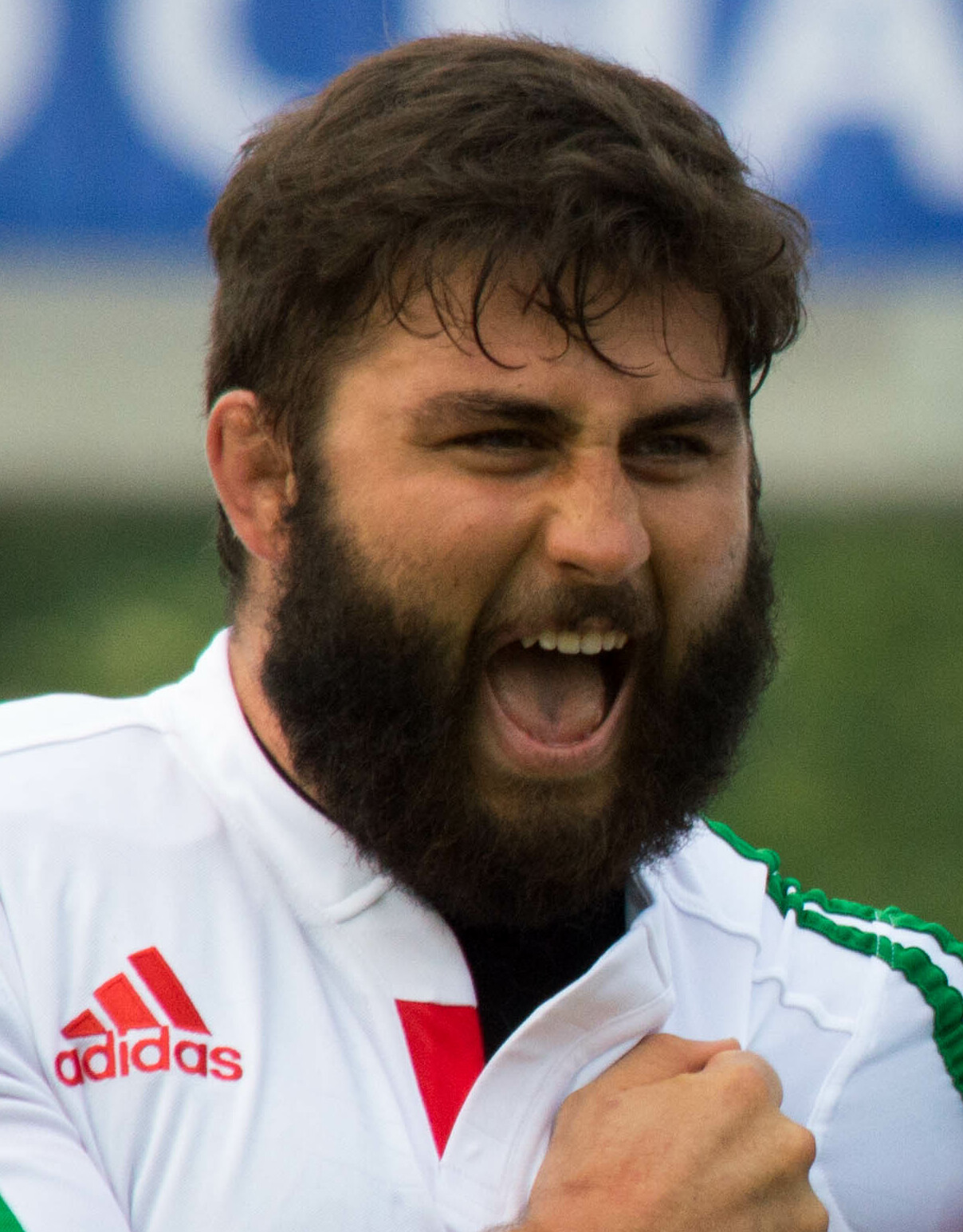
- Buonfiglio in 2015
- Born: 28 January 1995 (age 31) Prato, Italy
- Height: 1.82 m (6 ft 0 in)
- Weight: 108 kg (17 st 0 lb; 238 lb)

Rugby union career
- Position: Prop
- Current team: Zebre
Youth career
- UR Prato-Sesto
Senior career
| Years | Team | Apps | (Points) |
| 2013−2014 | F.I.R. Academy | | |
| 2014−2019 | Mogliano | 74 | (10) |
| 2019− | Zebre | 64 | (0) |
| 2019−2021 | →Mogliano | 6 | (0) |
- Correct as of 9 Aug 2026
International career
| Years | Team | Apps | (Points) |
| 2014−2015 | Italy Under 20 | 20 | (0) |
| 2016−2021 | Italy A | 6 | (0) |
| 2026 | Italy XV | 1 | (0) |
| 2023− | Italy | 1 | (0) |
- Correct as of 5 Aug 2023

Paolo Buonfiglio (Prato, 28 January 1995) is an Italian professional rugby union player. His usual position is prop and he currently plays for Zebre in United Rugby Championship.

Under contract with Mogliano, in 2015–16 Pro12 season, he named as Additional Player for Benetton Treviso in Pro 12.

In 2014 and 2015, Buonfiglio was named in the Italy Under 20 squad and in 2016 and 2017 he was named in the Emerging Italy squad. On 8 November 2021 he was named in the Italy A squad for the 2021 end-of-year rugby union internationals. On 5 July 2023, he was selected by Kieran Crowley to be part of an Italy squad for the 2023 Rugby World Cup warm-up matches. He made his debut against Ireland in the second match of 5 Augbust 2023. On 6 March 2026 he played for Italy XV on official test against Chile during 2026 men's rugby union internationals window of spring..

For injury cover, On 2 October 2023, he was named in the Italy's 33-man squad for the 2023 Rugby World Cup.
