= Leonard Krumov =

Italian rugby union player

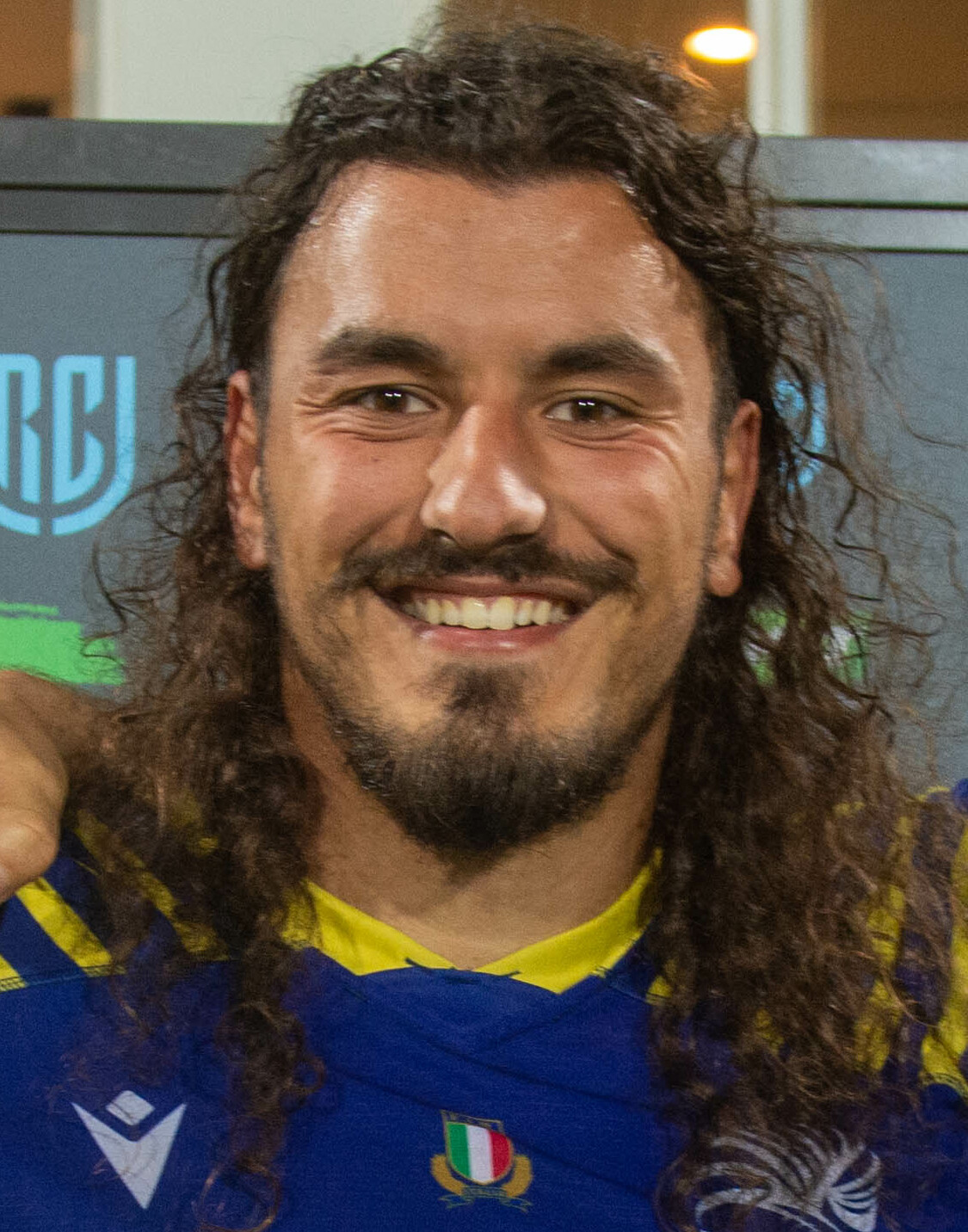
- Krumov in 2023
- Born: 1 May 1996 (age 30) Sesto San Giovanni, Italy
- Height: 1.98 m (6 ft 6 in)
- Weight: 120 kg (18 st 13 lb; 265 lb)

Rugby union career
- Position: Lock
- Current team: Zebre
Youth career
- Rugby Crema
- –: Viadana
Senior career
Years	Team	Apps	(Points)
2014−2015	F.I.R. Academy		
2015−2017	Viadana	30	(15)
2017−	Zebre	150	(20)
- Correct as of 26 Sep 2026
International career
Years	Team	Apps	(Points)
2015−2016	Italy Under 20	10	(10)
2017−	Italy A	6	(0)
- Correct as of 24 Jun 2022

Leonard Krumov (Sesto San Giovanni, 1 May 1996) is a professional Italian rugby union player. His usual position is lock and he currently plays for Zebre in United Rugby Championship.

After playing for Italy Under 20 in 2015 and 2016, in November 2016 and June 2017 Krumov was named in the Emerging Italy squad for the Nations Cup. On the 14 October 2021, he was selected by Alessandro Troncon to be part of an Italy A 28-man squad for the 2021 end-of-year rugby union internationals.

He is one of Zebre centurioni, one of the few players to have collected at least 100 appearances for the club. He reached this goal on the 1st of March 2024 against Munster in Cork.
