= Davide Fragnito =

Italian rugby union player (1996)

- Born: 3 February 1996 (age 30) Benevento, Italy
- Height: 1.95 m (6 ft 5 in)
- Weight: 110 kg (243 lb; 17 st 5 lb)

Rugby union career
- Position: Lock
- Current team: Fiamme Oro
Youth career
- Rugby Benevento
Senior career
Years	Team	Apps	(Points)
2014−2016	F.I.R. Academy		
2016−	Fiamme Oro	61	(25)
2017	→Zebre	3	(0)
- Correct as of 27 May 2020
International career
Years	Team	Apps	(Points)
2015−2016	Italy Under 20	11	(0)
2017−2018	Emerging Italy	4	(5)
- Correct as of 27 May 2020

Davide Fragnito (born 3 February 1996) is an Italian rugby union player. His usual position is as a Lock and he currently plays for Fiamme Oro in Top12.

In 2016–17 Pro12 and 2017–18 Pro14 seasons, Fragnito was named Additional Player for Zebre.

After playing for Italy Under 20 in 2015 and 2016, in 2017 and 2018 he also was named in the Emerging Italy squad.
