= Andrea De Marchi (rugby union, born 1992) =

Italian rugby union player

- Born: 29 May 1992 (age 34) Rovigo, Italy
- Height: 1.87 m (6 ft 2 in)
- Weight: 97 kg (214 lb; 15 st 4 lb)

Rugby union career
- Position: Flanker
- Current team: Fiamme Oro
Senior career
Years	Team	Apps	(Points)
2011−2015	Rovigo Delta	64	(60)
2015−2016	Benetton Treviso	13	(0)
2016−2018	Rovigo Delta	34	(20)
2018−	Fiamme Oro		
- Correct as of 30 May 2020
International career
Years	Team	Apps	(Points)
2012	Italy Under 20	4	(0)
- Correct as of 30 May 2020

Andrea De Marchi (born 29 May 1992) is an Italian rugby union player. His usual position is as a Flanker, and he currently plays for Fiamme Oro in Top12.

In 2015–16 Pro12 season De Marchi played for Benetton Treviso.

In 2012 De Marchi was named in the Italy Under 20 squad.
