= Simone Marinaro =

Italian rugby union player

- Born: 15 January 1993 (age 33) Benevento, Italy
- Height: 1.79 m (5 ft 10 1/2 in)
- Weight: 84 kg (185 lb; 13 st 3 lb)

Rugby union career
- Position: Scrum-half
- Current team: Fiamme Oro
Youth career
- Union Rugby Sannio
- –: US Rugby Benevento
- –: F.I.R. Academy
Senior career
Years	Team	Apps	(Points)
2012–	Fiamme Oro	102	(140)
2020	→ Zebre	1	(0)
- Correct as of 29 Dec 2020
International career
Years	Team	Apps	(Points)
2013	Italy U20s	5	(0)
2015–2017	Italy A	8	(10)
- Correct as of 1 Dec 2020

Simone Marinaro (born 15 January 1993) is an Italian rugby union player, currently playing for Top12 side Fiamme Oro. He is also an additional player for the Pro14 side Zebre. His preferred position is scrum-half.

After playing for Italy Under 20 in 2013, from 2015 to 2017 he also was named in the Emerging Italy squad.

== Zebre ==
Marinaro was named as an additional player in November 2020 for 2020–21 Pro14 season. He made his Zebre debut in Round 6 of the 2020–21 Pro14 against Munster.
