= Maicol Azzolini =

Italian rugby union player

- Born: 15 October 1995 (age 31) Pesaro, Italy
- Height: 1.81 m (5 ft 11 in)
- Weight: 85 kg (13 st 5 lb; 187 lb)

Rugby union career
- Position: Fly-Half
- Current team: Pesaro Rugby
Youth career
- Pesaro Rugby
Senior career
Years	Team	Apps	(Points)
2014−2015	F.I.R. Academy		
2015−2017	Fiamme Oro	32	(227)
2015−2017	→Zebre	5	(6)
2017−2019	Zebre	14	(6)
2019−2023	Fiamme Oro	24	(151)
2023−	Pesaro Rugby		
- Correct as of 24 May 2020
International career
Years	Team	Apps	(Points)
2013−2015	Italy Under 20	22	(27)
2016−2018	Emerging Italy	7	(27)
- Correct as of 24 May 2020

Maicol Azzolini (Pesaro, 15 October 1995) is an Italian rugby union player. His usual position is as a Fly-Half and he currently plays for Pesaro Rugby in Italian Serie A, after the experience with Fiamme Oro.

In 2015–16 Pro12 and 2016–17 Pro12, he named like Additional Player for Zebre in Pro 14. and in 2017–18 Pro14 and 2018–19 Pro14 seasons, he played for Zebre in Pro 14.

From 2013 to 2015 Azzolini was named in the Italy Under 20 squad and from 2016 to 2018, he also was named in the Emerging Italy squad.
