= Juan Echeverría =

Uruguayan rugby union player

- Full name: Juan Antonio Echeverría Rodriguez
- Born: 9 October 1991 (age 35) Florida, Uruguay
- Height: 172 cm (5 ft 8 in)
- Weight: 113 kg (249 lb)

Rugby union career
- Position: Prop
- Current team: Peñarol Rugby
Senior career
Years	Team	Apps	(Points)
2019−2020	Austin Herd	18	(5)
2021−	Peñarol		
- Correct as of 24 September 2019
International career
Years	Team	Apps	(Points)
2010−2011	Uruguay Under 20	7	(0)
2014–present	Uruguay	51	(25)
- Correct as of 24 September 2019

Juan Antonio Echeverría Rodriguez (born 9 October 1991) is a Uruguayan rugby union player who generally plays as a prop represents Uruguay internationally. He was included in the Uruguayan squad for the 2019 Rugby World Cup which was held in Japan for the first time and also marked his first World Cup appearance.

== Career ==
He made his international debut for Uruguay against Paraguay on 26 April 2014. He was also part of the Uruguayan team which won the 2017 World Rugby Nations Cup.
