= Matteo Minozzi =

Italy international rugby union player (born 1996)

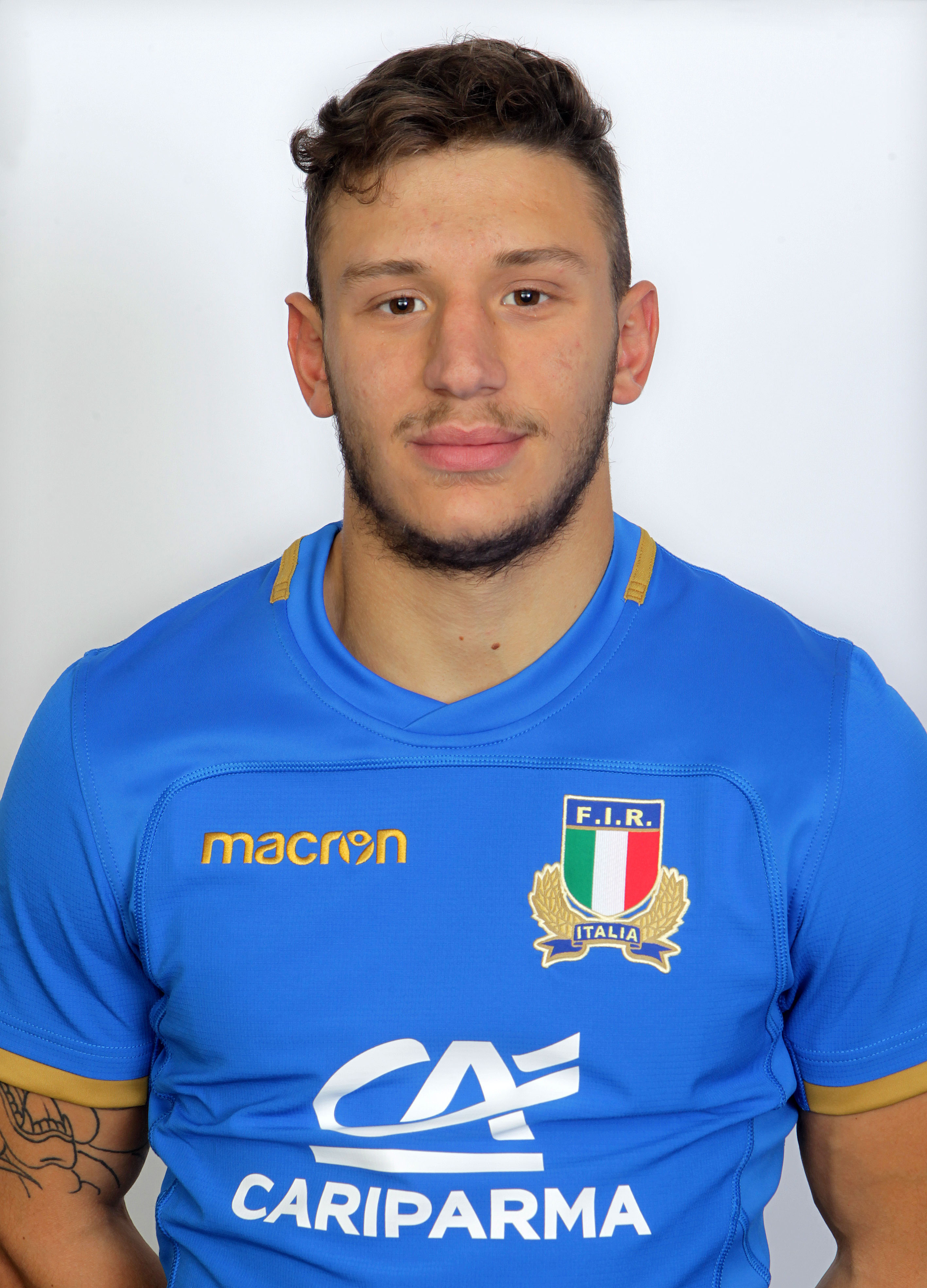
- Minozzi in 2017
- Born: 4 June 1996 (age 30) Padua, Italy
- Height: 1.75 m (5 ft 9 in)
- Weight: 77 kg (12 st 2 lb; 170 lb)

Rugby union career
- Position(s): Fullback, Wing
- Current team: Benetton
Youth career
- 2006−2013: Valsugana Rugby Padova
- 2013−2015: F.I.R. Academy
Senior career
Years	Team	Apps	(Points)
2015−2017	Calvisano	34	(176)
2017−2019	Zebre	17	(10)
2019−2022	Wasps	35	(15)
2022−2024	Benetton	6	(0)
2024−	Petrarca Padova		
- Correct as of 11 Sep 2022
International career
Years	Team	Apps	(Points)
2015−2016	Italy Under 20	18	(34)
2017	Emerging Italy	1	(5)
2017–2022	Italy	24	(55)
- Correct as of 13 Nov 2021

Matteo Minozzi (born 4 June 1996) is an Italian rugby union player. His usual position is as a Fullback.

== Career ==
Minozzi previously played for Italian Pro14 team Zebre, from 2017 to 2019, and English team Wasps, from 2019 to 2022, in Premiership Rugby.

He played for Italian United Rugby Championship side Benetton from November 2022 until his temporary retire in February 2024.

From 2015 to 2016, Minozzi was named in the Italy Under 20 squad and in 2017 he parteciped with Emerging Italy in 2017 World Rugby Nations Cup. On 10 January 2023, he was named in Italy A squad for a uncapped test against Romania A.

After 2018 Six Nations Championship, Minozzi was nominated for 2018 Six Nations Player of the Tournament after scoring 4 tries in 5 games On 18 August 2019, he was named in the final 31-man squad for the 2019 Rugby World Cup. He represented Italy on 24 occasions from 2017 to 2022, with 55 points.

== International tries ==
As of 19 November 2022

Try	Opposing team	Location	Venue	Competition	Date	Result	Score
1	Ireland	Dublin, Ireland	Aviva Stadium	2018 Six Nations	10 February 2018	Loss	56–19
2	France	Saint-Denis, France	Stade de France	2018 Six Nations	23 February 2018	Loss	34–17
3	Wales	Cardiff, Wales	Principality Stadium	2018 Six Nations	11 March 2018	Loss	38–14
4	Scotland	Rome, Italy	Stadio Olimpico	2018 Six Nations	17 March 2018	Loss	27–29
5	Russia	San Benedetto del Tronto, Italy	Stadio Riviera delle Palme	2019 Rugby World Cup Warm-Ups	17 August 2019	Win	85–15
6	Russia	San Benedetto del Tronto, Italy	Stadio Riviera delle Palme	2019 Rugby World Cup Warm-Ups	17 August 2019	Win	85–15
7	Russia	San Benedetto del Tronto, Italy	Stadio Riviera delle Palme	2019 Rugby World Cup Warm-Ups	17 August 2019	Win	85–15
8	Namibia	Higashiōsaka, Japan	Hanazono Rugby Stadium	2019 Rugby World Cup	22 September 2019	Win	47–22
9	Canada	Fukuoka, Japan	Hakatanomori Football Stadium	2019 Rugby World Cup	26 September 2019	Win	48–7
10	France	Saint-Denis, France	Stade de France	2020 Six Nations	9 February 2020	Loss	35–22
11	Scotland	Florence, Italy	Stadio Artemio Franchi	Autumn Nations Cup	14 November 2020	Loss	17–28
