= Samuele Ortis =

Italian rugby union player

- Born: 18 December 1996 (age 29) Venezia, Italy
- Height: 1.96 m (6 ft 5 in)
- Weight: 108 kg (17 st 0 lb; 238 lb)

Rugby union career
- Position: Lock
- Current team: Rovigo Delta
Youth career
- Venezia Mestre
- –: Ruggers Tarvisium
Senior career
Years	Team	Apps	(Points)
2014−2015	F.I.R. Academy		
2015−2016	Lyons Piacenza	11	(0)
2016−2018	Rovigo Delta	30	(0)
2018−2021	Zebre	31	(0)
2021−2023	Calvisano	37	(20)
2023−	Rovigo Delta		
- Correct as of 14 May 2022
International career
Years	Team	Apps	(Points)
2015−2016	Italy Under 20	14	(0)
2017−2018	Emerging Italy	5	(0)
- Correct as of 18 Nov 2017

Samuele Ortis (born Venezia, 18 December 1996) is an Italian rugby union player. His usual position is as a lock, and he currently plays for Rovigo Delta in Serie A Elite.

He played for Italian Pro14 team Zebre from 2018-19 season to 2020-21 season. In 2021, he signed with Calvisano in Top10 until 2022−2023 season.

After playing for Italy Under 20 in 2015 and 2016, in 2017 and 2018, Ortis was named in the Emerging Italy squad for the World Rugby Nations Cup.
