= Franco Cuaranta =

Argentine rugby union player (born 1992)

- Born: 23 May 1992 (age 34) Córdoba, Argentina
- Height: 5 ft 10 in (178 cm)
- Weight: 194 lb (88 kg)

Rugby union career
- Position: Wing
International career
Years	Team	Apps	(Points)
2016	Argentina	2	(10)

Franco Cuaranta (born 23 May 1992) is an Argentine international rugby union player.

Cuaranta was an association football left-winger for Lasallano and came close to earning a trial with Estudiantes de La Plata, before making the switch to rugby at the age of 16.

In 2014, Curaranta played on the Tala side that won the Torneo del Interior.

Curaranta trained with Super Rugby team Jaguares in 2016 and was capped twice that year for Argentina, playing on the wing in away internationals against Uruguay and Chile.

== See also ==
- List of Argentina national rugby union players
