= 2016 South American Rugby Championship "A" =

- Date: April 23 – May 7, 2016
- Countries: Brazil; Chile; Paraguay; Uruguay

Tournament statistics
- Matches played: 6

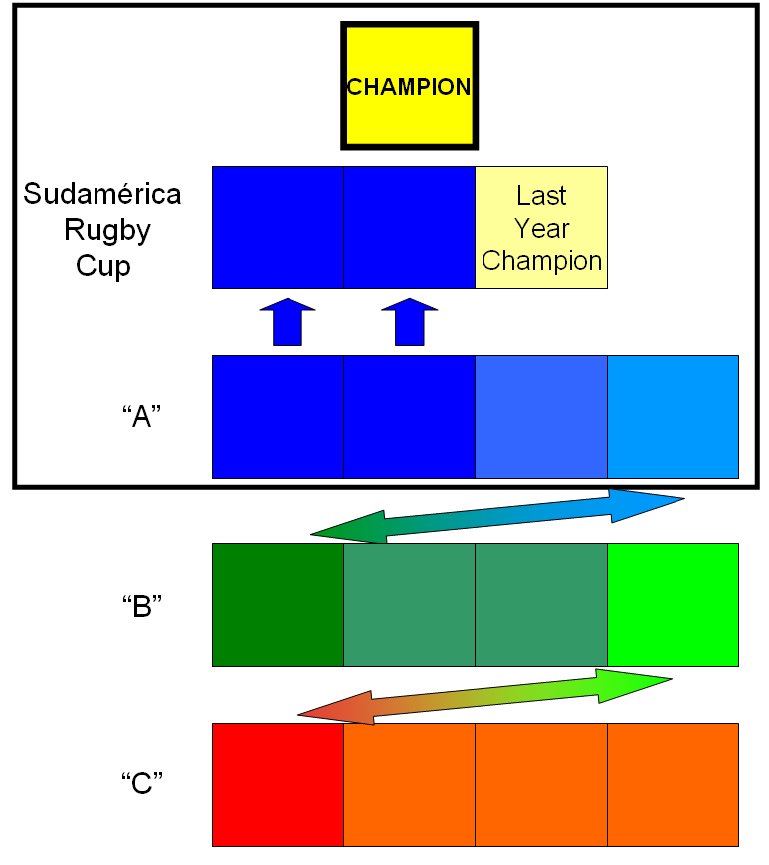
Structure of the South America rugby union competition, in four levels with 13 countries

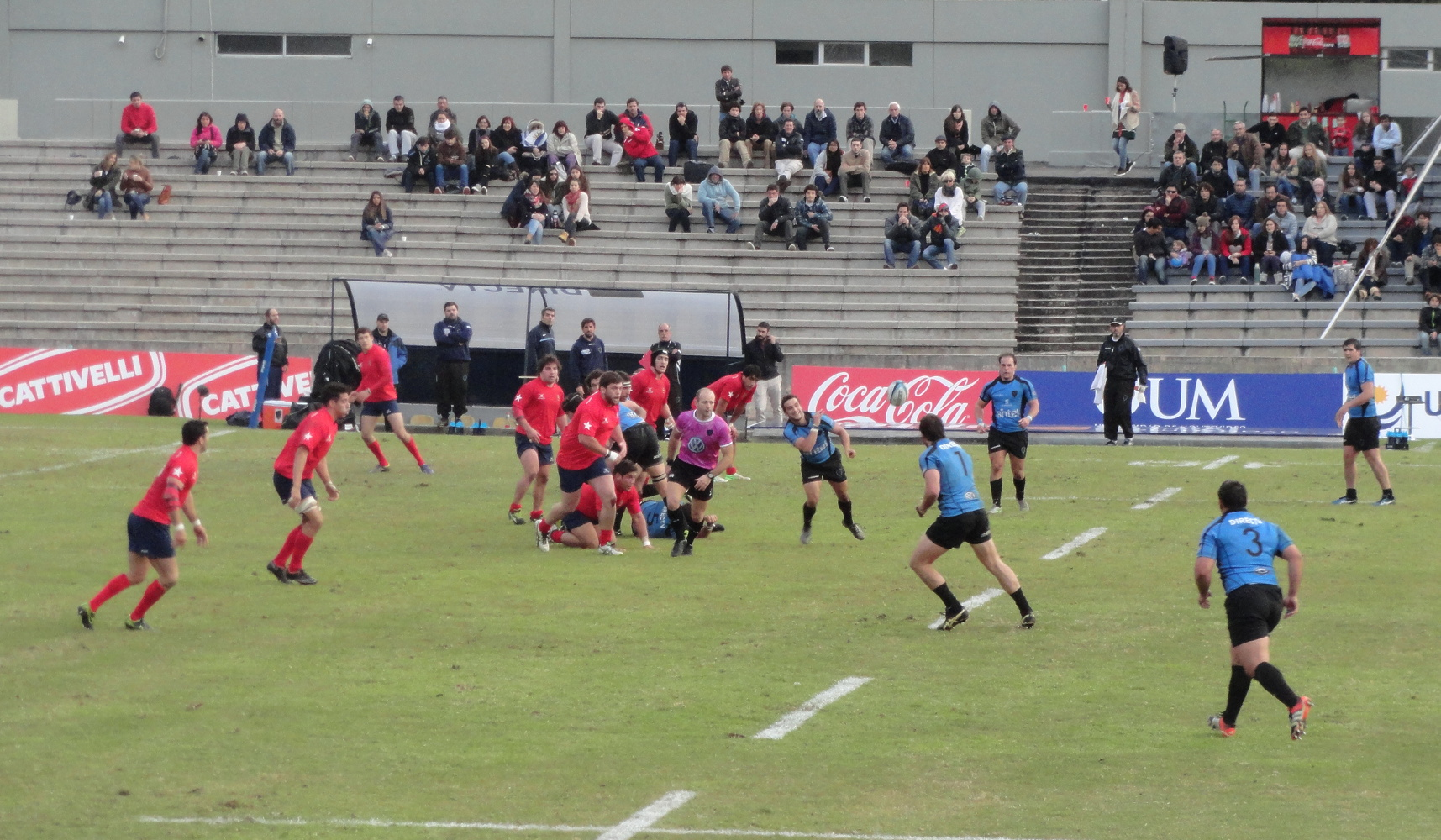
Match between Uruguay and Chile

The 2016 South American Rugby Championship (Confederación Sudamericana de Rugby (CONSUR) Championship) Division A was the third edition of the second level of the South American Rugby Championship. The tournament was played in a round-robin format, with each team playing each other team once. The two first teams won the right to compete in the top level tournament of South American Rugby Championship, the South America Rugby Cup.

The first match of the 2016 Sudamérica Rugby Cup, between Uruguay and Chile, doubled as the closing match of the South American Rugby Championship.

== Standings ==
Pos	Team	Pld	W	D	L	PF	PA	PD	Pts	Qualification
1	Uruguay (20)	3	3	0	0	135	43	+92	9	Contested South American Cup in 2016
2	Chile (29)	3	1	1	1	102	66	+36	4	Contested South American Cup in 2016
3	Brazil (38)	3	1	1	1	66	77	−11	4	
4	Paraguay (37)	3	0	0	3	43	160	−117	0	

Pre-tournament rankings are in parentheses.

== Matches ==
=== Week 1 ===
23 April 2016

Brazil	14–36	Uruguay
Try: 20 Mark Jackson (1); 13 Felipe Sancery (1); Con: 10 Moisés Duque (2)		Try: 6 Gonzalo Campomar (2); 13 Joaquín Prada (1); 5 Diego Magno (1); 7 Juan Diego Ormeachea (1); Con: 10 Martín Secco (3); 23 Santiago Martínez (1); Pen: 10 Martín Secco (1)

Allianz Parque, São Paulo
Attendance: 7,692

23 April 2016

Chile	68–7	Paraguay
Try: 8 Benjamin Soto; 2 Manuel Gurruchaga; 15 Pablo Casas; 14 Pedro Verschae; 12 Germán Herrera; 9 Juan Pablo Perrotta; 10 Rodrigo Fernandez; 13 Matías Nordenflycht; 11 Matías Contreras; 20 Gustavo Currasco; Con: 13 Matías Nordenflycht (6); Pen: 13 Matías Nordenflycht (2)		Try: 13 Sergio Alvargena; Con: 13 Sergio Alvargena; Cards: 3 Alvaro Rojas (Y)

Santiago

=== Week 2 ===
30 April 2016
15:30 PYT (UTC-4)

Paraguay	15–60	Uruguay

30 April 2016
16:15 BRT (UTC-3)

Brazil	20–20	Chile

=== Week 3 ===
7 May 2016

Uruguay	39–14	Chile

7 May 2016

Paraguay	21–32	Brazil
