= 2016 Sudamérica Rugby Cup =

- Date: May 7 – June 4 2016
- Countries: Argentina; Chile; Uruguay

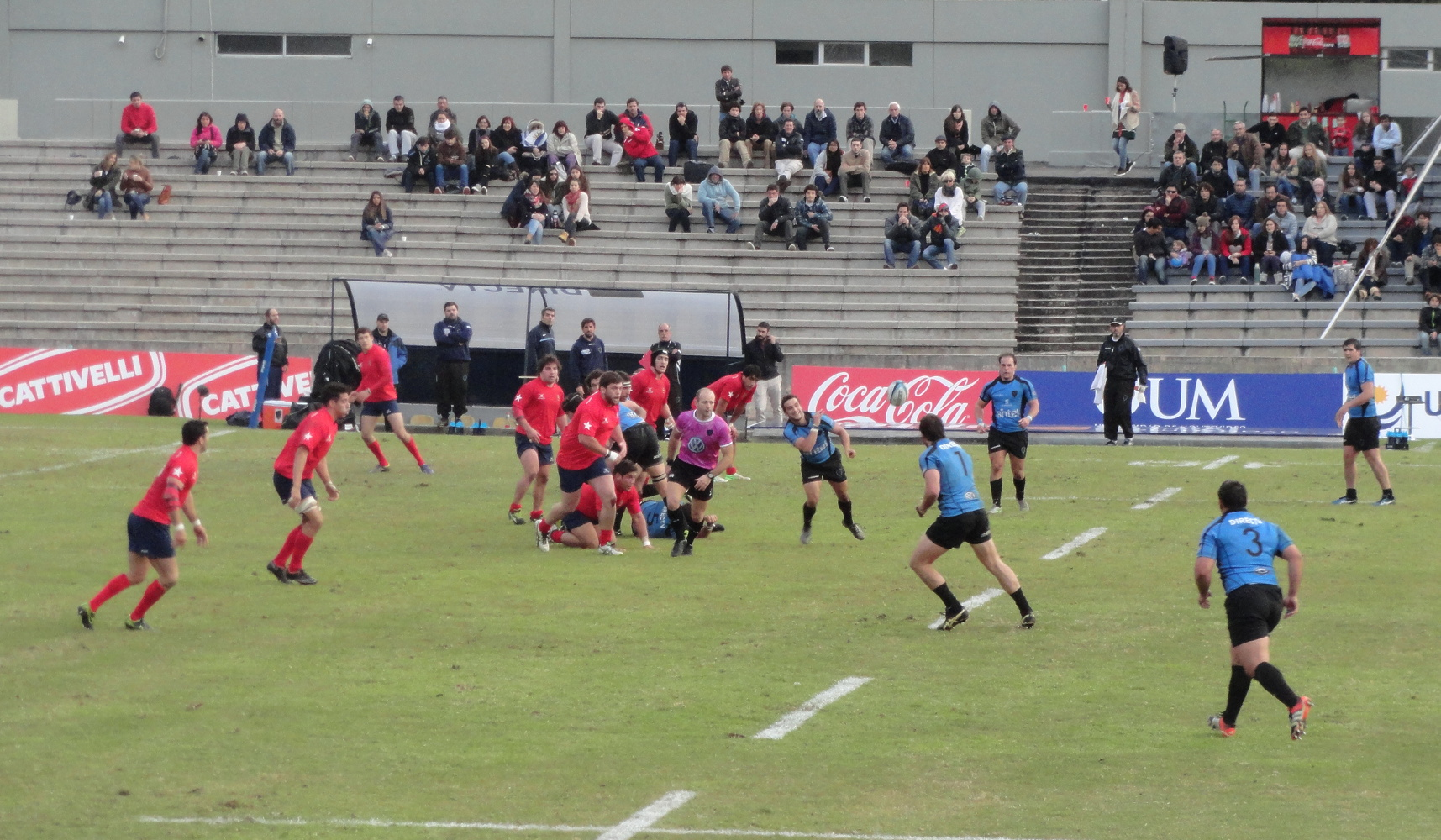
Match between Uruguay and Chile

The 2016 Sudamérica Rugby Cup was the third edition of the Sudamérica Rugby Cup, and its first with the current name, since CONSUR had re-branded itself as Sudamérica Rugby in July 2015. Argentina were automatically seeded and qualified for the tournament as the top ranked side in South America, while Chile and Uruguay qualified by virtue of being the top two ranked teams in the 2015 South American Rugby Championship "A".

The last game of the 2016 South American Rugby Championship "A", between Uruguay and Chile, doubled as the opening game of the Sudamérica Rugby Cup this year.

== Standings ==
Place	Nation	Games				Points			Table points
Place	Nation	played	won	drawn	lost	for	against	diff	Table points
1	Argentina	2	2	0	0	105	20	+85	6
2	Uruguay	2	1	0	1	47	32	+15	3
3	Chile	2	0	0	2	26	126	-100	0

== Matches ==
The game day schedule was announced and released on February 23, 2016.

=== Round 1 ===
7 May 2016
15:30 UYT (UTC-03)

Uruguay	39–14	Chile

Estadio Charrúa, Montevideo, Uruguay

=== Round 2 ===
28 May 2016
TBD UYT (UTC-03)

Uruguay	8–18	Argentina

Estadio Suppici, Colonia del Sacramento, Uruguay

=== Round 3 ===
4 June 2016
TBD CLT (UTC−03)

Chile	12–87	Argentina

Chile

== See also ==
- South American Rugby Championship
- 2016 South American Rugby Championship "A"
- 2016 South American Rugby Championship "B"
- 2016 South American Rugby Championship "C"
