= Dan Suter =

- Born: Dan Suter; 29 June 1993 (age 33) Neath, Wales
- Height: 180 cm (5 ft 11 in)
- Weight: 114 kg (17 st 13 lb)
- School: Neath Port Talbot College

Rugby union career
- Position: Tighthead Prop
- Current team: Dragons
Senior career
Years	Team	Apps	(Points)
2012-2017	Ospreys	25	(0)
2017-	Dragons	4	(0)
- Correct as of 28 May 2018
International career
Years	Team	Apps	(Points)
- Wales U20

Dan Suter (born 29 June 1993) is a Welsh rugby union player who plays for the Dragons regional team as a prop. He was also a Wales under-20 international.

Suter made his debut for the Ospreys regional team in 2012 having previously played for the Ospreys academy, Bridgend Ravens, Aberavon RFC, Swansea RFC and Tonmawr RFC. He was released by the Ospreys at the end of the 2016–17 season.

Suter joined the Dragons for the 2017–18 season.
