= Renato Giammarioli =

Italy international rugby union player

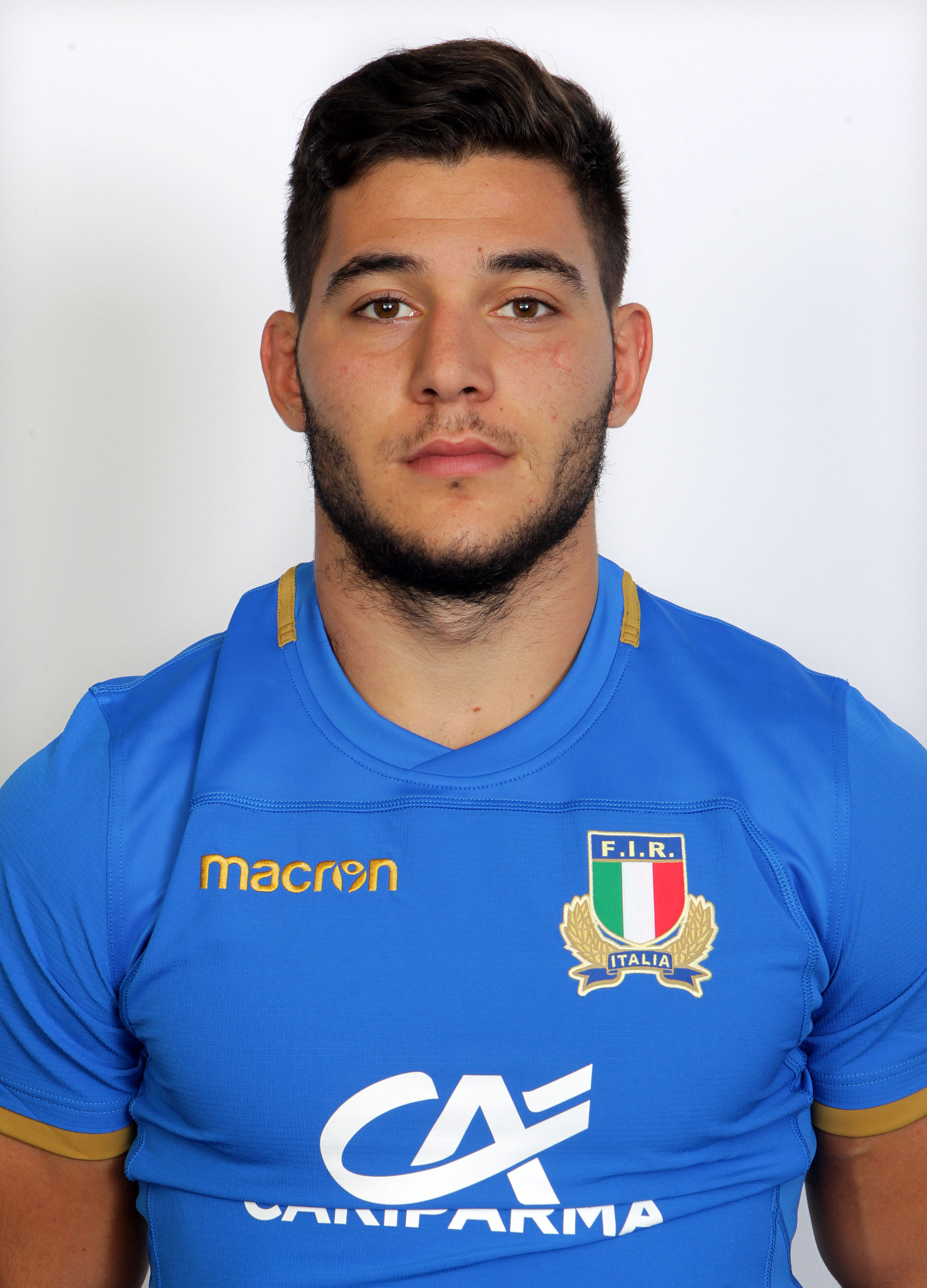
- Giammarioli in 2017
- Born: 23 March 1995 (age 31) Marino, Italy
- Height: 1.83 m (6 ft 0 in)
- Weight: 112 kg (17 st 9 lb; 247 lb)

Rugby union career
- Position: Flanker
- Current team: Fiamme Oro
Youth career
- 2005−2013: Rugby Frascati
Senior career
Years	Team	Apps	(Points)
2013−2014	Rugby Frascati		
2014−2015	F.I.R. Academy		
2015	→Zebre	2	(0)
2015−2017	Calvisano	42	(60)
2017–2022	Zebre	70	(40)
2022	Worcester Warriors	0	(0)
2022−2023	Bordeaux	6	(5)
2023−	Fiamme Oro		
- Correct as of 26 Mar 2022
International career
Years	Team	Apps	(Points)
2014–2015	Italy Under 20	14	(20)
2016–2017	Emerging Italy	6	(11)
2017–	Italy	8	(0)
- Correct as of 10 Jul 2022

Renato Giammarioli (Marino, 23 March 1995) is an Italian rugby union player. His usual position is as a Flanker, and he currently plays for Fiamme Oro in Italian Serie A Elite.

== Career ==
For 2014–15 Pro12 season, Giammarioli named like Additional Player for Zebre. In 2017, after the experience with Top12 team Calvisano, he signed for Zebre and he played for Italian team until 2021–22 United Rugby Championship season. For 2022−23 season, he played for French team Bordeaux, after the brief experience in England with Worcester Warriors at the begin of 2022-23 season.

In 2014 and 2015, Giammarioli was named in the Italy Under 20 squad and in 2016 and 2017, he was part of Emerging Italy squad.

In 2017, Giammarioli was named in the Italy squad for 2017 Autumn International Tests.
