= Peadar Timmins =

Irish rugby union player

- Born: Peadar Timmins; 8 January 1994 (age 32) Baltinglass, County Wicklow, Ireland
- Height: 1.88 m (6 ft 2 in)
- Weight: 105 kg (16 st 7 lb)
- School: Clongowes Wood College
- University: University College Dublin

Rugby union career
- Position: Flanker
- Current team: Leinster
Amateur team(s)
Years	Team	Apps	(Points)
2012–2018	UCD		
Senior career
Years	Team	Apps	(Points)
2016–2018	Leinster	13	(0)
- Correct as of 28 April 2018
International career
Years	Team	Apps	(Points)
2013–2014	Ireland U20	18	(5)
- Correct as of 20 June 2014

Peadar Timmins (born 8 January 1994) is an Irish rugby union player for Pro14 and European Rugby Champions Cup side Leinster.
