= Amatori Alghero =

Italian rugby union club, based in Alghero, Sardinia

(Italy) Amatori Alghero
- Full name: Amatori Rugby Alghero
- Union: Italian Rugby Federation
- Founded: 1975; 51 years ago
- Location: Alghero, Italy
- Ground: Stadio Maria Pia (Capacity: 1.000)
- League: Serie B
- 2014-15: 6th

Official website
- www.algherorugby.it

Amatori Alghero is an Italian rugby union team based in Alghero, Sardinia. It currently plays in Serie B, the third division of the Italian league.

== Notable former players ==
- Fangatapu Apikotoa 24 caps for Tonga (2 tries, 120 points)
- Gert Peens 23 caps for Italy (105 points)
- Juan Francesio 4 caps for Italy
- Benjamin de Jager 1 cap for Italy and Italy Sevens
- Steven Bortolussi Italy Sevens
