= Fiamme Oro Rugby =

Italian rugby union club, based in Rome

(Italy) Fiamme Oro Rugby
- Full name: G.S. Fiamme Oro Rugby
- Union: Italian Rugby Federation
- Founded: 1955; 71 years ago
- Location: Rome, Italy
- Ground: Centro Sportivo Polizia di Stato (Capacity: 1,300)
- President: Armando Forgione
- Coach: Gianluca Guidi
- Captain: Filippo Cristiano
- League: Serie A Élite
1st kit	2nd kit

Official website
- www.fiammeororugby.it

Fiamme Oro Rugby is the rugby union club section of the Italian State Police sport division Gruppo Sportivo Fiamme Oro. The Fiamme Oro are currently based in Rome and play in the Top 10, the first national league. Though since the club's foundation in the 1950s, the former Fiamme Oro Padova won both the Italian championship (5 times) and the Coppa Italia (4 times).

The club was established in 1955, founded by a group of policemen based in Padua (hence the name). The Fiamme Oro Padova won their first championship in 1958, which was followed by another the following season. The team also had a lot of success during the 1960s; winning the National championship in 1960, 1961 and 1968. In addition to their success with the National league, the club won the Coppa Italia in 1968 and 1969 and again in 1971 and 1972 as well.

In 1978, after their first relegation, the club were de facto discontinued although never officially disbanded and in 1985 were re-formed in Milan. The Italian Rugby Federation, because of club's successful past, allowed them to restart from 3rd division. In 1993 the club moved to Rome, and in 1998 rejoined the 1st division. Relegated again in 2000, in 2011 they returned in the Italian championship, where they currently play, and where they won their first Excellence Trophy in 2013–14.

== Honours ==
- Italian championship
  - Champions (5): 1957–58, 1958–59, 1959–60, 1960–61, 1967–68
- Coppa Italia
  - Champions (4): 1967–68, 1968–69, 1970–71, 1971–72
  - Runners-Up (1): 2024–25
- Excellence Trophy
  - Champions (1): 2013–14
  - Runners-Up (2): 2016–17, 2017–18

== Current squad ==
Fiamme Oro squad for 2024–25 season:

Fiamme Oro squad.
**Props**: (Italy) Antonio Barducci; (Italy) Riccardo Bartolini; (Italy) Matteo Drudi; (Italy) Fabio Morosi; (Italy) Samuel Stelitano; (Italy) Guido Romano; (Italy) Alessandro Vannozzi; **Hookers**: (Italy) Vittorio Carnio; (Italy) Diego De Rossi; (Italy) Alain Moriconi; (Italy) Niccolò Taddia; **Locks**: (Italy) Andrea Angelone; (Italy) Massimiliano Chiappini; (Italy) Ugo D'Onofrio; (Italy) Alessandro Filoni; (Italy) Davide Fragnito; (Italy) Nicola Piantella; (Italy) **Cristian Stoian**	**Back row**: (Italy) Andrea Chianucci; (Italy) Andrea De Marchi; (Italy) **Renato Giammarioli**; (Italy) Giulio Marrucchini; (Italy) Alessandro Strampelli; (Italy) Giammarco Vian; **Scrum-halves**: (Italy) Simone Marinaro; (Italy) Gianmarco Piva; (Italy) Gianluca Tomaselli; **Fly-halves**: (Italy) **Carlo Canna**; (Italy) Filippo Di Marco	**Centres**: (Italy) Alessandro Forcucci; (Italy) Arturo Fusari; (Italy) Alessio Guardiano; (Italy) Ludovico Vaccari; **Wings**: (Italy) Simone Cornelli; (Italy) Alessio Crea; (Italy) Giovanni D'Onofrio; (Italy) Matteo Gabbianelli; (Italy) Cristian Lai; (Italy) Michael Mba; (Italy) Alessio Pensieri; **Fullbacks**: (Italy) Michelangelo Biondelli
(c) denotes the team captain, **Bold** denotes internationally capped players.^{*} denotes players qualified to play for Italy on residency or dual nationality. Players and their allocated positions from Fiamme Oro website.

== Selected former players ==
=== Italian players ===
Former players who have played for Fiamme Oro Rugby and have caps for Italy:

- (Italy) Anacleto Altigieri
- (Italy) Andrea Bacchetti
- (Italy) Arturo Bergamasco
- (Italy) Ottorino Bettarello
- (Italy) Carlo Canna
- (Italy) Giancarlo Cucchiella
- (Italy) Simone Favaro
- (Italy) Nello Francescato
- (Italy) Giovanni Licata
- (Italy) Roberto Luise
- (Italy) Giancarlo Navarrini
- (Italy) Mario Piovan
- (Italy) Pasquale Presutti
- (Italy) Roberto Quartaroli
- (Italy) Stefano Romagnoli
- (Italy) Carlo Salmaso
- (Italy) Michele Sepe
- (Italy) Matteo Silini
- (Italy) Luigi Troiani

== See also ==
- Gruppo Sportivo Fiamme Oro
- Polizia di Stato
- European Rugby Continental Shield
