= Mogliano Rugby =

Italian rugby union club, based in Mogliano Veneto

(Italy) Mogliano Rugby 1969
- Full name: Mogliano Rugby 1969 S.S.D.
- Union: Italian Rugby Federation
- Founded: 1956; 70 years ago
- Location: Mogliano Veneto, Italy
- Ground: Stadio Maurizio Quaggia (Capacity: 786)
- President: Maurizio Piccin
- Coach: Andrea Cavinato
- Captain: Matteo Corazzi
- League: Serie A Élite
1st kit	2nd kit

Official website
- www.rugbymogliano.it

Mogliano Rugby 1969 is a professional Italian rugby union club founded in 1956. They are based in Mogliano Veneto (Province of Treviso), in Veneto. Champions of Italy in the 2012–13 season, they are currently competing in the Italian Top10.

== Honours ==
- Italian championship
  - Champions (1): 2012–13
- Serie A Elite Cup
  - Champions (1): 2023–24

== Current squad ==
Mogliano Rugby 2025-2026 squad (Note: Academy player under contract with URC team Benetton) (Note: Additional player on loan to URC team Benetton)
**Props**: (Italy) Damiano Borean; (Italy) Geremias De Sarro; (Italy) Riccardo Genovese; (Italy) Francesco Gentile; (Italy) Salvatore Lipera; (Italy) Simone Marcaggi; (Argentina) Jose Alejandro Marquez Santucho; **Hookers**: (Italy) Mattia Bonan; (Italy) Edoardo Ferraro; (Italy) Cristiano Stefani; **Locks**: (Argentina) Felipe Bruno*; (Italy) Guglielmo Carraro; (Italy) **Marco Lazzaroni**; (Italy) Mattia Midena; (Italy) Enrico Pontarini	**Back row**: (Italy) Lorenzo Brevigliero; (Italy) Nelson Casartelli; (Italy) Mirco Finotto; (Fiji) Simon Koroiyadi; (Italy) Antony Miranda; (Italy) **Giovanni Pettinelli**; (Italy) Leonardo Semenzato; **Scrum-halves**: (Italy) Matteo Bellotto; (Italy) Francesco Fabi; (Australia) Cristiano Tizzano*; **Fly-halves**: (Italy) Andrea Benvenuti; (Italy) Matteo Garbisi; (Italy) Nicolò Teneggi	**Centres**: (Italy) **Tommaso Boni**; (Italy) Filippo Drago; (Italy) Gianmarco Magni; (Italy) Dario Schiabel; (Tonga) Michael Va'eno; (Italy) Giacomo Vanzella; (Brazil) **Antonio Zanatta**; **Wings**: (Italy) Cristian Coletto; (Italy) Roberto Dal Zilio; (Italy) **Leonardo Sarto**; **Fullbacks**: (Italy) Alessandro Drago; (Italy) **Edoardo Padovani**; (Italy) Michele Peruzzo
(c) denotes the team captain, **Bold** denotes internationally capped players.^{*} denotes players qualified to play for Italy on residency or dual nationality. Players and their allocated positions from the Mogliano website.

== Selected former players ==
=== Italian players ===
Former players who have played for Mogliano and have caps for Italy:

- (Argentina) Santiago Mare
- (Italy) Filippo Alongi
- (Italy) Paul Derbyshire
- (Italy) Andrea Pratichetti
- (Italy) Fabio Semenzato
- (Namibia) Tiaan de Klerk
- (Uruguay) Franco Lamanna
