= Italy A national rugby union team =

Italy A
- Union: Federazione Italiana Rugby
- Coach: Alessandro Troncon
- Top scorer: Luciano Orquera (119 Nations Cup Only)
- Most tries: Michele Sepe (4 Nations Cup Only)
Team kit	Change kit

First international
- Poland 3-34 Italy A (Poznan, Poland; 22 April 1962)

Largest win
- Italy A 102-3 Denmark (Brescia, Italy; 1 November 1997)

Largest defeat
- Italy A 17-73 Ireland XV (Livorno, Italy; 9 April 1999)

The Italy A national rugby union team (Italian: Nazionale A di rugby a 15 dell'Italia, also known as Italia Emergenti which means Italy Emerging Players, Italia XV or Italia Under 23) are the second national rugby union team in Italy after the national side.

They competed in the Six Nations "A" from 2000 to 2003, in the IRB Nations Cup from 2006 until 2013, except in 2011 when they played the Churchill Cup. They have also participated in the IRB Tbilisi Cup in 2014.

From 2016 to 2018 it played in the World Rugby Nations Cup.

== Tournament record ==
Year	Tournament	Host	Rank
2000	Six Nations "A"	-	6th
2001	Six Nations "A"	-	5th
2002	Six Nations "A"	-	5th
2003	Six Nations "A"	-	5th
2006	IRB Nations Cup	Portugal	2nd
2007	IRB Nations Cup	Romania	5th
2008	IRB Nations Cup	Romania	4th
2009	IRB Nations Cup	Romania	2nd
2010	IRB Nations Cup	Romania	3rd
2011	Churchill Cup	England	3rd
2012	IRB Nations Cup	Romania	3rd
2013	IRB Nations Cup	Romania	2nd
2014	IRB Tbilisi Cup	(Georgia (country)) Georgia	3rd
2015	World Rugby Tbilisi Cup	(Georgia (country)) Georgia	2nd
2016	World Rugby Nations Cup	Romania	4th
2017	World Rugby Nations Cup	Uruguay	6th
2018	World Rugby Nations Cup	Uruguay	3rd

== Record ==
Below is a table of the representative rugby matches played by Italy A up until 6 March 2026, updated after the match with Chile XV.

Opponent	Played	Won	Lost	Drawn	% Won
Argentina XV	5	1	4	0	20%
Australia A	3	0	3	0	0%
Belgium	2	2	0	0	100%
Canada	1	0	1	0	0%
Canada A	2	2	0	0	100%
Catalonia	1	1	0	0	100%
Chile XV	1	1	1	0	100%
Croatia	1	1	0	0	100%
Czechoslovakia	1	1	0	0	100%
Denmark	1	1	0	0	100%
England A	17	1	16	0	5.88%
Fiji Warriors	1	0	1	0	0%
France A	5	0	5	0	0%
Georgia	6	4	2	0	66.67%
Ireland XV	6	1	5	0	16.67%
Namibia XV	1	1	0	0	100%
Netherlands	1	1	0	0	100%
New Zealand XV	1	0	1	0	0%
Poland	7	7	0	0	100%
Portugal	2	1	0	1	50%
Romania	3	1	2	0	33.33%
Romania A	2	2	0	0	100%
Russia	4	4	0	0	100%
Scotland A	9	2	6	1	22.22%
South Africa A	1	0	1	0	0%
Spain A	1	1	0	0	100%
Tonga	1	1	0	0	100%
Tonga A	2	0	2	0	0%
Tunisia	1	1	0	0	100%
Uruguay A	1	1	0	0	100%
Wales A	3	0	3	0	0%
Zimbabwe	3	2	1	0	66.67%
Zimbabwe A	1	1	0	0	100%
Total	98	42	54	2	42.86%

== Current squad ==
On 28 January 2026, the following players were called up for two official tests against Scotland A and Chile during 2026 men's rugby union internationals window of spring. On 27 February an updating of squad.

Head coach: (Italy) Massimo Brunello

Forwards
Player	Position	Club
Nicholas Gasperini	Hooker	(Italy) Benetton
Giovanni Quattrini*	Hooker	(Italy) Zebre Parma
Valerio Siciliano**	Hooker	(France) Brive
Destiny Aminu	Prop	(Italy) Benetton
Paolo Buonfiglio **	Prop	(Italy) Zebre Parma
Luca Franceschetto	Prop	(Italy) Zebre Parma
Marcos Gallorini	Prop	(Italy) Benetton
Riccardo Genovese*	Prop	(Italy) Mogliano/Zebre Parma
Fabio Morosi*	Prop	(Italy) Fiamme Oro
Sergio Pelliccioli**	Prop	(Italy) Petrarca Padova
Juan Pitinari**	Prop	(Italy) Zebre Parma
Matteo Canali	Lock	(Italy) Zebre Parma
Giulio Marini	Lock	(Italy) Benetton
Alex Mattioli	Lock	(France) Racing 92
Alessandro Ortombina	Lock	(Italy) Zebre Parma
Jacopo Botturi**	Back row	(Italy) Petrarca Padova
Nelson Casartelli	Back row	(Italy) Mogliano/Benetton
Giacomo Ferrari	Back row	(Italy) Zebre Parma
Jadin Kingi*	Back row	(Italy) Benetton
Davide Ruggeri*	Back row	(Italy) Zebre Parma
Pietro Turrisi**	Lock	(France) Racing 92

Backs
Player	Position	Club
Nicolò Casilio**	Scrum-half	(Italy) Valorugby Emilia
Lorenzo Citton	Scrum-half	(Italy) Petrarca Padova
Cristiano Tizzano*	Scrum-half	(Italy) Mogliano/Benetton
Filippo Lazzarin*	Fly-half	(Italy) Valorugby Emilia
Giovanni Montemauri	Fly-half	(Italy) Zebre Parma
Giulio Bertaccini *	Centre	(Italy) Zebre Parma
Damiano Mazza**	Centre	(Italy) Zebre Parma
Francois Carlo Mey	Centre	(France) Soyaux Angoulême
Marco Zanon	Centre	(Italy) Zebre Parma
Fabrizio Ciardullo**	Wing	(Italy) Viadana
Alessandro Forcucci*	Wing	(Italy) Fiamme Oro
Simone Gesi *	Wing	(Italy) Zebre Parma
Marco Scalabrin**	Wing	(Italy) Petrarca Padova
Leonardo Sodo Migliori	Wing	(Italy) Fiamme Oro
Mirko Belloni	Fullback	(Italy) Zebre Parma
Simone Brisighella	Fullback	(Italy) Valorugby Emilia

- Only for Scotland A test
  - Only for Chile test
