= History of rugby union matches between Italy and Scotland =

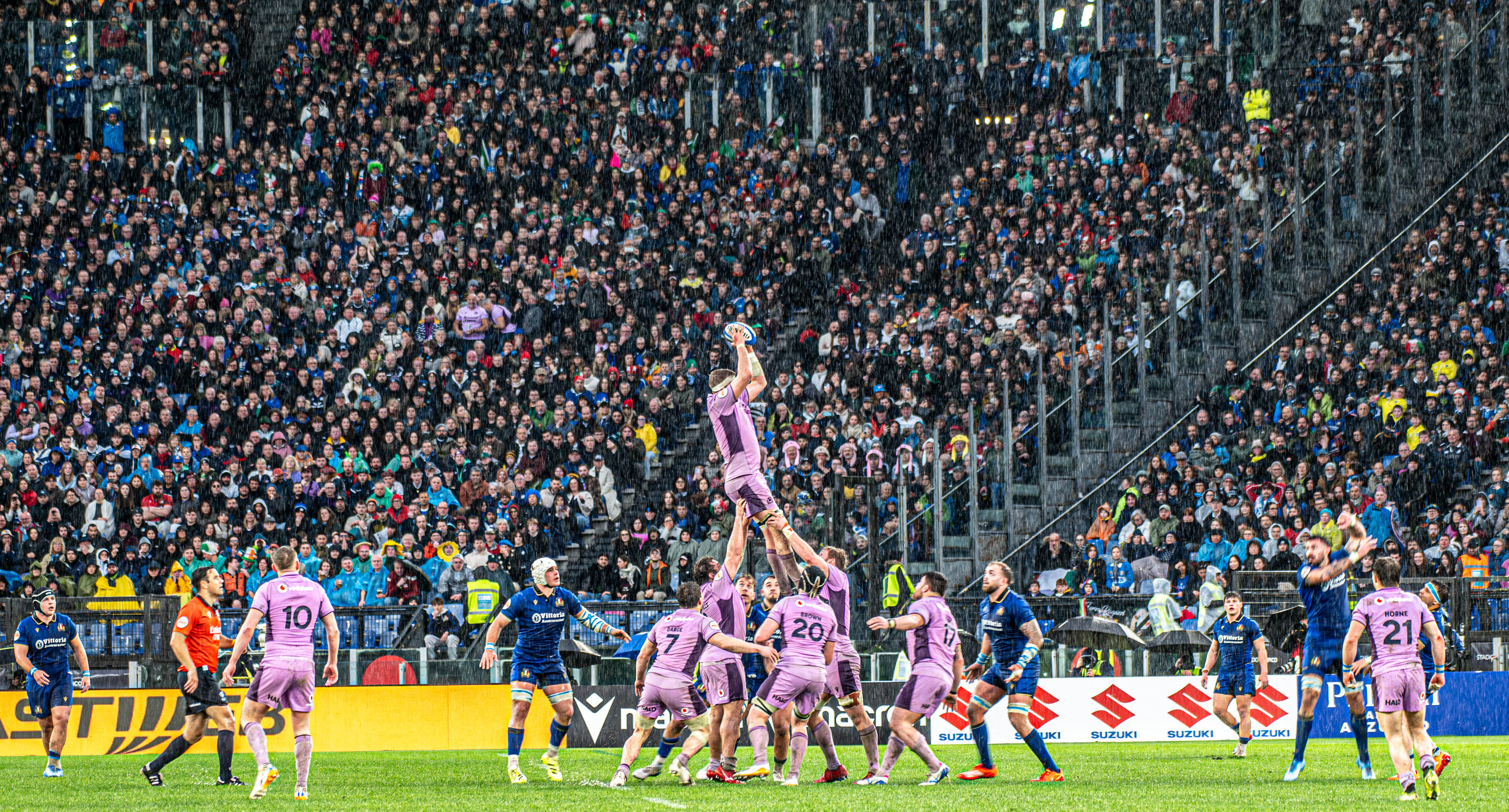
Scotland lineout against Italy in the 2026 Six Nations Championship, Stadio Olimpico.

Italy and Scotland have played each other at rugby union in 39 matches, with Scotland winning 29 times, Italy winning 10 times and no matches drawn.

Italy won their most recent encounter, 18–15 on 7 February 2026 during the 2026 Six Nations Championship.

The two nations compete for the Cuttitta Cup, an annual trophy contested during the Six Nations to commemorate Massimo Cuttitta, a former Italian captain and Scotland scrum coach.

== Summary ==
=== Overall ===
Details	Played	Won by Italy	Won by Scotland	Drawn	Italy points	Scotland points
In Italy	17	8	9	0	320	359
In Scotland	19	2	17	0	281	564
Neutral venue	3	0	3	0	58	82
Overall	39	10	29	0	659	1005

=== Records ===
Note: Date shown in brackets indicates when the record was set.

Record	Italy	Scotland
Longest winning streak	1 (nine times)	13 (22 Aug 2015 – 29 July 2023)
Largest points for
Home	34 (5 February 2000)	52 (20 March 2021)
Away	37 (24 February 2007)	36 (27 February 2016)
Largest winning margin
Home	14 (5 February 2000)	42 (20 March 2021)
Away	20 (24 February 2007)	17 (16 February 2002 & 22 February 2020)

== Results ==
No.	Date	Venue	Score	Winner	Competition
1	14 December 1996	Murrayfield, Edinburgh	29 – 22	Scotland	
2	24 January 1998	Stadio Comunale di Monigo, Treviso	25 – 21	Italy	
3	6 March 1999	Murrayfield, Edinburgh	30 – 12	Scotland	
4	5 February 2000	Stadio Flaminio, Rome	34 – 20	Italy	2000 Six Nations Championship
5	17 March 2001	Murrayfield, Edinburgh	23 – 19	Scotland	2001 Six Nations Championship
6	16 February 2002	Stadio Flaminio, Rome	12 – 29	Scotland	2002 Six Nations Championship
7	29 March 2003	Murrayfield, Edinburgh	33 – 25	Scotland	2003 Six Nations Championship
8	23 August 2003	Murrayfield, Edinburgh	47 – 15	Scotland	2003 Rugby World Cup warm-up matches
9	6 March 2004	Stadio Flaminio, Rome	20 – 14	Italy	2004 Six Nations Championship
10	26 February 2005	Murrayfield, Edinburgh	18 – 10	Scotland	2005 Six Nations Championship
11	18 March 2006	Stadio Flaminio, Rome	10 – 13	Scotland	2006 Six Nations Championship
12	24 February 2007	Murrayfield, Edinburgh	17 – 37	Italy	2007 Six Nations Championship
13	29 September 2007	Stade Geoffroy-Guichard, Saint-Étienne, France	18 – 16	Scotland	2007 Rugby World Cup
14	15 March 2008	Stadio Flaminio, Rome	23 – 20	Italy	2008 Six Nations Championship
15	28 February 2009	Murrayfield, Edinburgh	26 – 6	Scotland	2009 Six Nations Championship
16	27 February 2010	Stadio Flaminio, Rome	16 – 12	Italy	2010 Six Nations Championship
17	19 March 2011	Murrayfield, Edinburgh	21 – 8	Scotland	2011 Six Nations Championship
18	20 August 2011	Murrayfield, Edinburgh	23 – 12	Scotland	2011 Rugby World Cup Warm up
19	17 March 2012	Stadio Olimpico, Rome	13 – 6	Italy	2012 Six Nations Championship
20	9 February 2013	Murrayfield, Edinburgh	34 – 10	Scotland	2013 Six Nations Championship
21	22 June 2013	Loftus Versfeld, Pretoria, South Africa	30 – 29	Scotland	South African Quadrangular tournament third place final
22	22 February 2014	Stadio Olimpico, Rome	20 – 21	Scotland	2014 Six Nations Championship
23	28 February 2015	Murrayfield, Edinburgh	19 – 22	Italy	2015 Six Nations Championship
24	22 August 2015	Stadio Olimpico di Torino, Turin	12 – 16	Scotland	2015 Rugby World Cup warm-ups
25	29 August 2015	Murrayfield, Edinburgh	48 – 7	Scotland	2015 Rugby World Cup warm-ups
26	27 February 2016	Stadio Olimpico, Rome	20 – 36	Scotland	2016 Six Nations Championship
27	18 March 2017	Murrayfield, Edinburgh	29 – 0	Scotland	2017 Six Nations Championship
28	10 June 2017	National Stadium, Kallang, Singapore	13 – 34	Scotland	2017 mid-year test
29	17 March 2018	Stadio Olimpico, Rome	27 – 29	Scotland	2018 Six Nations Championship
30	2 February 2019	Murrayfield, Edinburgh	33 – 20	Scotland	2019 Six Nations Championship
31	22 February 2020	Stadio Olimpico, Rome	0 – 17	Scotland	2020 Six Nations Championship
32	14 November 2020	Stadio Artemio Franchi, Florence	17 – 28	Scotland	Autumn Nations Cup
33	20 March 2021	Murrayfield, Edinburgh	52 – 10	Scotland	2021 Six Nations Championship
34	12 March 2022	Stadio Olimpico, Rome	22 – 33	Scotland	2022 Six Nations Championship
35	18 March 2023	Murrayfield, Edinburgh	26 – 14	Scotland	2023 Six Nations Championship
36	29 July 2023	Murrayfield, Edinburgh	25 – 13	Scotland	2023 Rugby World Cup warm-up
37	9 March 2024	Stadio Olimpico, Rome	31 – 29	Italy	2024 Six Nations Championship
38	1 February 2025	Murrayfield, Edinburgh	31–19	Scotland	2025 Six Nations Championship
39	7 February 2026	Stadio Olimpico, Rome	18–15	Italy	2026 Six Nations Championship
