= Cuttitta =

Cuttitta is an Italian surname. Notable people with the surname include:

- Marcello Cuttitta (born 1966), Italian rugby union player and coach
- Massimo Cuttitta (1966–2021), Italian rugby union player and coach
