= History of rugby union matches between Ireland and Italy =

A scrum during Italy vs Ireland at the Six Nations 2011

The History of rugby union matches between Ireland and Italy dates back to New Year's Eve 1988 when Ireland defeated Italy in a tour test match, 31–15. Ireland have dominated the meetings, with the Italians having achieved only four victories. The teams' most recent meeting was in the 2026 Six Nations Championship in Dublin, where Ireland won 20–13.

== Summary ==
=== Overview ===
Details	Played	Won by Ireland	Won by Italy	Drawn	Ireland points	Italy points
In Ireland	21	20	1	0	792	276
In Italy	15	12	3	0	476	270
Neutral venue	3	3	0	0	106	22
Overall	39	35	4	0	1,374	568

=== Records ===
Note: Date shown in brackets indicates when the record was or last set.

Record	Ireland	Italy
Longest winning streak	17 (8 March 2014 – present)	3 (6 May 1995 – 10 April 1999)
Largest points for
Home	61 (30 August 2003)	37 (20 December 1997)
Away	63 (11 February 2017)	37 (4 January 1997)
Neutral	54 (3 November 2018)	9 (4 October 2015)
Largest winning margin
Home	55 (30 August 2003)	15 (20 December 1997)
Away	53 (11 February 2017)	8 (4 January 1997)
Neutral	47 (3 November 2018)	—N/a

=== Attendance ===
Up to date as of 14 February 2026.

Total attendance*	1,493,346
Average attendance*	43,922
Highest attendance	77,686; Ireland 29–11 Italy; 6 February 2010
*Excludes three matches in which no attendance was reported and two matches in which Covid restricted attendance

== Results ==
No.	Date	Venue	Score	Winner	Competition	Attendance	Ref.
1	31 December 1988	Lansdowne Road, Dublin	31–15	Ireland	1988–89 Italy tour of Ireland	—N/a	
2	6 May 1995	Stadio Comunale di Monigo, Treviso	22–12	Italy	1995 Rugby World Cup warm-up match	—N/a	
3	3 January 1997	Lansdowne Road, Dublin	29–37	Italy	1997 Italy tour of Ireland	25,000	
4	20 December 1997	Stadio Renato Dall'Ara, Bologna	37–22	Italy	1997 Ireland tour of Italy	—N/a	
5	10 April 1999	Lansdowne Road, Dublin	39–30	Ireland	Six Nations Preparation International (Note: In the year preceding Italy joining the Six Nations, the fixtures were played in a shadow format, with Italy playing each of the then Five Nations during the 1999 Five Nations tournament.)	25,000	
6	4 March 2000	Lansdowne Road, Dublin	60–13	Ireland	2000 Six Nations Championship	40,000	
7	3 February 2001	Stadio Flaminio, Rome	22–41	Ireland	2001 Six Nations Championship	30,000	
8	23 March 2002	Lansdowne Road, Dublin	32–17	Ireland	2002 Six Nations Championship	49,000	
9	22 February 2003	Stadio Flaminio, Rome	13–37	Ireland	2003 Six Nations Championship	22,500	
10	30 August 2003	Thomond Park, Limerick	61–6	Ireland	2003 Rugby World Cup warm-up match	14,000	
11	20 March 2004	Lansdowne Road, Dublin	19–3	Ireland	2004 Six Nations Championship	49,250	
12	6 February 2005	Stadio Flaminio, Rome	17–28	Ireland	2005 Six Nations Championship	30,000	
13	4 February 2006	Lansdowne Road, Dublin	26–16	Ireland	2006 Six Nations Championship	49,500	
14	17 March 2007	Stadio Flaminio, Rome	24–51	Ireland	2007 Six Nations Championship	24,973	
15	24 August 2007	Ravenhill Stadium, Belfast	23–20	Ireland	2007 Rugby World Cup warm-up match	14,100	
16	2 February 2008	Croke Park, Dublin	16–11	Ireland	2008 Six Nations Championship	75,387	
17	15 February 2009	Stadio Flaminio, Rome	9–38	Ireland	2009 Six Nations Championship	32,000	
18	6 February 2010	Croke Park, Dublin	29–11	Ireland	2010 Six Nations Championship	77,686	
19	5 February 2011	Stadio Flaminio, Rome	11–13	Ireland	2011 Six Nations Championship	32,000	
20	2 October 2011	Otago Stadium, Dunedin (New Zealand)	36–6	Ireland	2011 Rugby World Cup	28,027	
21	25 February 2012	Aviva Stadium, Dublin	42–10	Ireland	2012 Six Nations Championship	51,000	
22	16 March 2013	Stadio Olimpico, Rome	22–15	Italy	2013 Six Nations Championship	74,174	
23	8 March 2014	Aviva Stadium, Dublin	46–7	Ireland	2014 Six Nations Championship	52,000	
24	7 February 2015	Stadio Olimpico, Rome	3–26	Ireland	2015 Six Nations Championship	57,700	
25	4 October 2015	Olympic Stadium, London (England)	16–9	Ireland	2015 Rugby World Cup	53,817	
26	12 March 2016	Aviva Stadium, Dublin	58–15	Ireland	2016 Six Nations Championship	51,700	
27	11 February 2017	Stadio Olimpico, Rome	10–63	Ireland	2017 Six Nations Championship	50,197	
28	10 February 2018	Aviva Stadium, Dublin	56–19	Ireland	2018 Six Nations Championship	51,700	
29	3 November 2018	Soldier Field, Chicago (United States)	54–7	Ireland	2018 Autumn International	35,000	
30	24 February 2019	Stadio Olimpico, Rome	16–26	Ireland	2019 Six Nations Championship	49,720	
31	10 August 2019	Aviva Stadium, Dublin	29–10	Ireland	2019 Rugby World Cup warm-up match	30,000	
32	24 October 2020	Aviva Stadium, Dublin	50–17	Ireland	2020 Six Nations Championship	0*	
33	27 February 2021	Stadio Olimpico, Rome	10–48	Ireland	2021 Six Nations Championship	0*	
34	28 February 2022	Aviva Stadium, Dublin	57–6	Ireland	2022 Six Nations Championship	51,000	
35	25 February 2023	Stadio Olimpico, Rome	20–34	Ireland	2023 Six Nations Championship	51,034	
36	5 August 2023	Aviva Stadium, Dublin	33–17	Ireland	2023 Rugby World Cup warm-up match	43,500	
37	11 February 2024	Aviva Stadium, Dublin	36–0	Ireland	2024 Six Nations Championship	51,700	
38	15 March 2025	Stadio Olimpico, Rome	17–22	Ireland	2025 Six Nations Championship	68,981	
39	14 February 2026	Aviva Stadium, Dublin	20–13	Ireland	2026 Six Nations Championship	51,700	

== Gallery ==
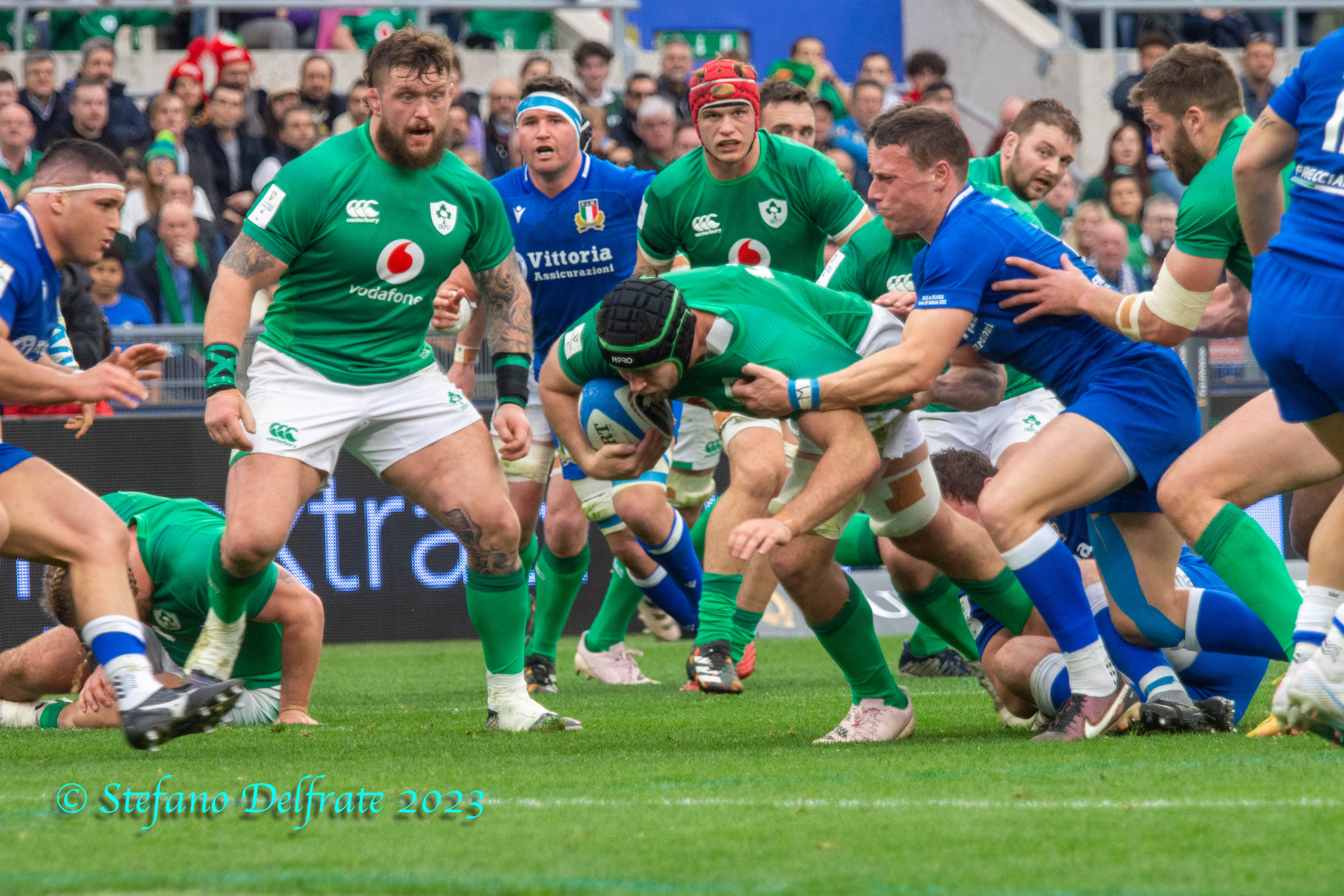
Irish player, Ryan Baird makes a carry against Italy in the 2023 Six Nations.

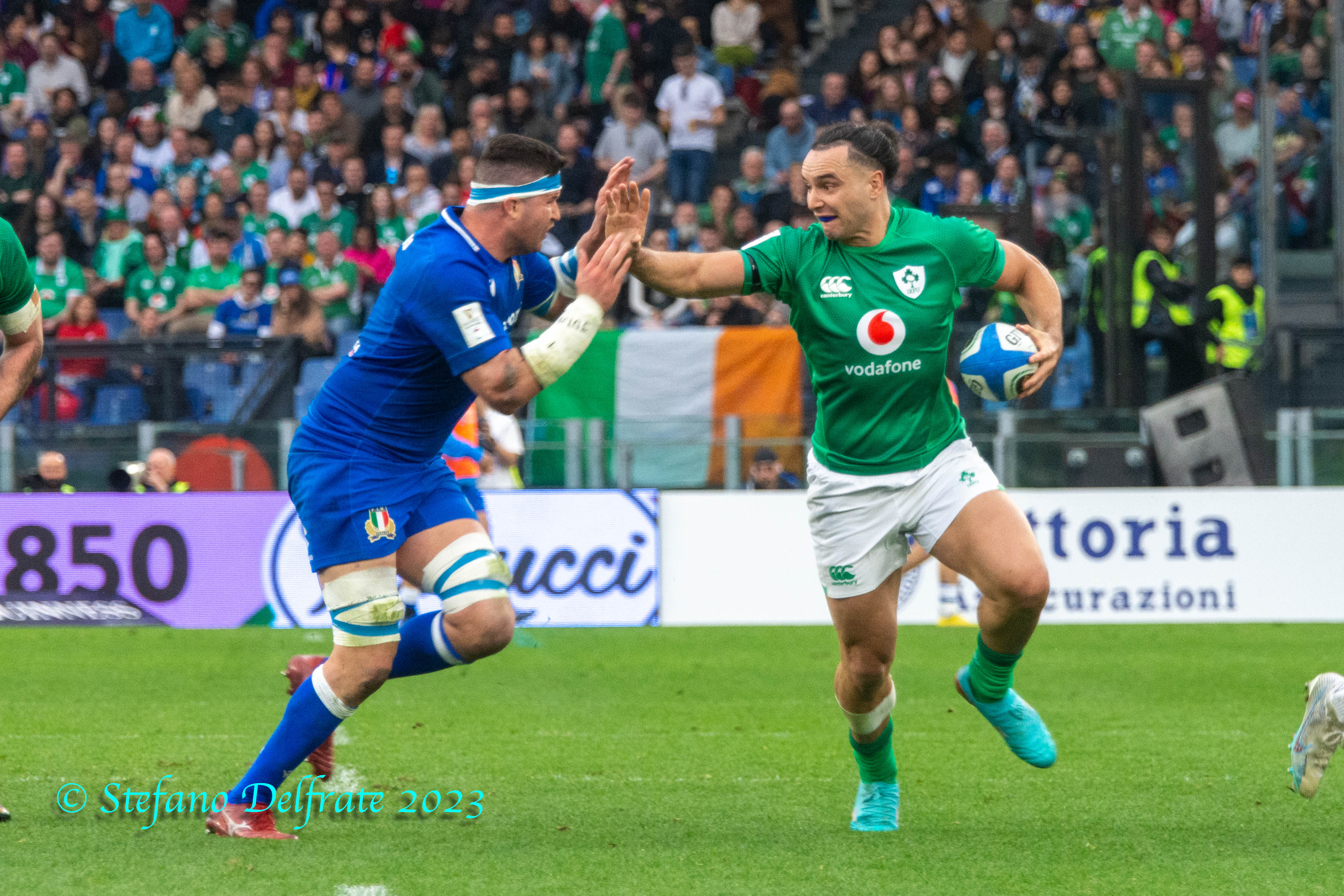
James Lowe fends off Italian defender during the 2023 Six Nations contest.

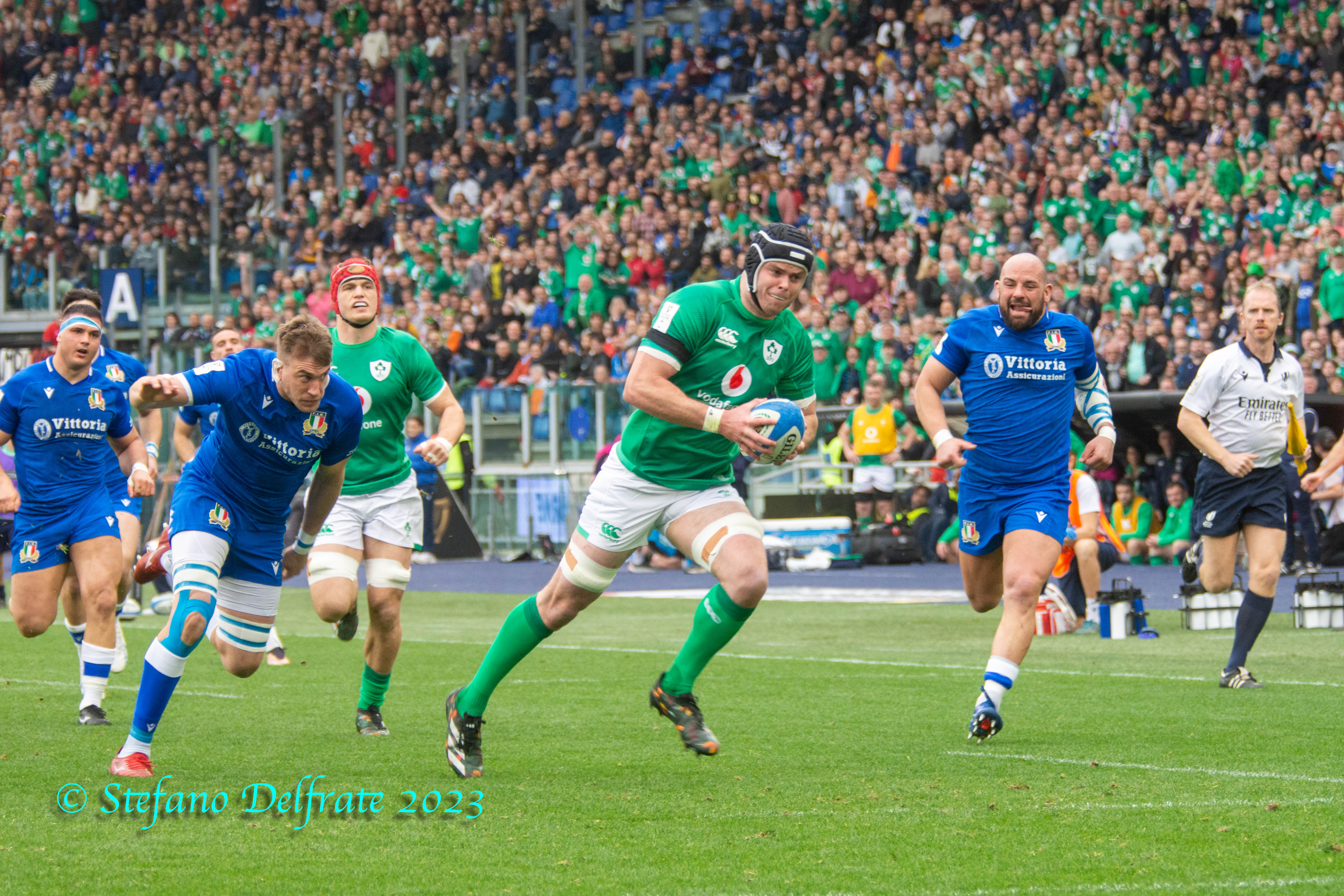
James Ryan makes a break during the 2023 Six Nations.

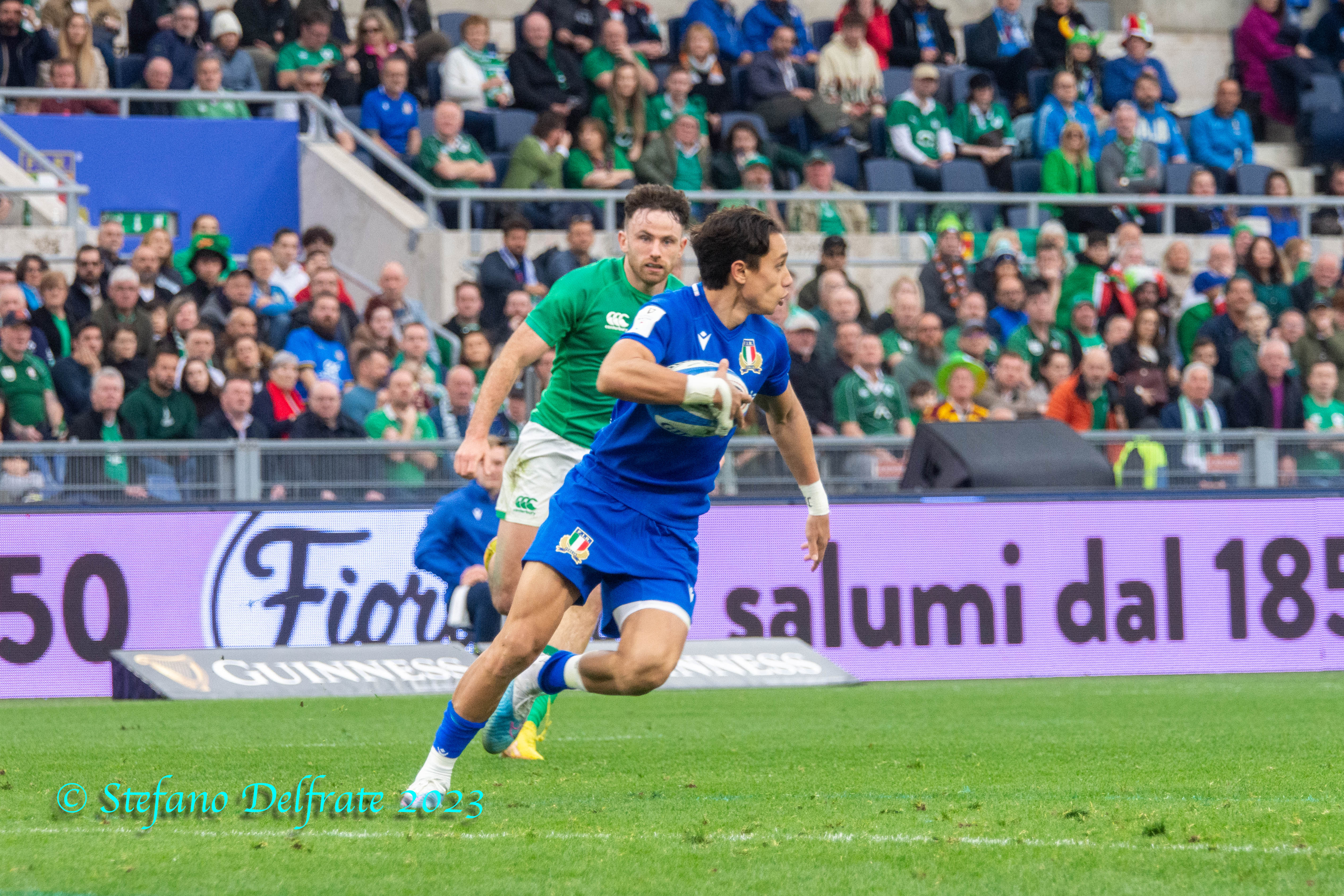
Ange Capuozzo with a carry during the 2023 Six Nations.
