= History of rugby union matches between Italy and New Zealand =

The All Blacks first played against Italy at the opening game of the inaugural Rugby World Cup in 1987, beating them 70–6 at Eden Park, Auckland. The two teams have played seventeen Test matches recognised by both sides as full internationals, with New Zealand winning all of them by an average margin of 51 points.

The two sides have been in the same pool in 7 of the 10 Rugby World Cup tournaments to date but have only played each other 6 times because Typhoon Hagibis caused their scheduled meeting in the 2019 tournament to be cancelled. The first 11 meetings between the two sides since their first clash in 1987 were never played at the same venue, then two tests had been held back to back at the Stadio Olimpico in Rome.

== Summary ==
Note: Summary below reflects test results by both teams.

=== Overall ===
Details	Played	Won by Italy	Won by New Zealand	Drawn	Italy points	New Zealand points
In New Zealand	4	0	4	0	39	208
In Italy	9	0	9	0	84	457
Neutral venue	5	0	5	0	62	374
Overall	18	0	18	0	185	1,039

=== Records ===
Note: Date shown in brackets indicates when the record was or last set.

Record	Italy	New Zealand
Longest winning streak	—N/a	18 (22 May 1987–present)
Largest points for
Home	19 (25 November 2000)	70 (22 May 1987)
Away	21 (13 October 1991)	101 (14 October 1999)
Largest winning margin
Home	—N/a	64 (22 May 1987)
Away	—N/a	98 (14 October 1999)

== Results ==
No.	Date	Venue	Score	Winner	Competition
1	22 May 1987	Eden Park, Auckland	70–6	New Zealand	1987 Rugby World Cup
2	13 October 1991	Welford Road Stadium, Leicester (England)	31–21	New Zealand	1991 Rugby World Cup
3	28 October 1995	Stadio Renato Dall'Ara, Bologna	6–70	New Zealand	1995 New Zealand tour of Italy and France
4	14 October 1999	McAlpine Stadium, Huddersfield (England)	101–3	New Zealand	1999 Rugby World Cup
5	25 November 2000	Stadio Luigi Ferraris, Genoa	19–56	New Zealand	2000 Autumn International
6	8 June 2002	Waikato Stadium, Hamilton	64–10	New Zealand	2002 Italy tour of New Zealand
7	11 October 2003	Colonial Stadium, Melbourne (Australia)	70–7	New Zealand	2003 Rugby World Cup
8	13 November 2004	Stadio Flaminio, Rome	10–59	New Zealand	2004 Autumn International
9	8 September 2007	Stade Vélodrome, Marseille (France)	76–14	New Zealand	2007 Rugby World Cup
10	27 June 2009	Lancaster Park, Christchurch	27–6	New Zealand	2009 June Tests
11	14 November 2009	San Siro Stadium, Milan	6–20	New Zealand	2009 Autumn International
12	17 November 2012	Stadio Olimpico, Rome	10–42	New Zealand	2012 Autumn International
13	12 November 2016	Stadio Olimpico, Rome	10–68	New Zealand	2016 Autumn International
14	24 November 2018	Stadio Olimpico, Rome	3–66	New Zealand	2018 Autumn International
—N/a (Note: Due to Typhoon Hagibis, the New Zealand–Japan match at the 2019 Rugby World Cup was cancelled and awarded as a 0–0 draw.)	~~12 October 2019~~	~~Toyota Stadium, Toyota (Japan)~~	0–0	Cancelled; drawn	~~2019 Rugby World Cup~~
15	6 November 2021	Stadio Olimpico, Rome	9–47	New Zealand	2021 Autumn International
16	29 September 2023	Parc Olympique Lyonnais, Lyon (France)	17–96	New Zealand	2023 Rugby World Cup
17	23 November 2024	Juventus Stadium , Turin	11–29	New Zealand	2024 Autumn International
18	11 July 2026	Wellington Regional Stadium, Wellington	47–17	New Zealand	2026 Nations Championship

== XV Results ==
Below is a match that Italy has awarded test match status by virtue of awarding caps, but New Zealand did not award caps.

Date	Venue	Score	Victor	Competition	Comments
22 October 1977	Padua	9–17	New Zealand XV	1977 New Zealand tour of Italy and France	Italy was represented as "Italian President's XV"
28 November 1979	Rovigo	12–18	New Zealand XV	1979 New Zealand tour of Great Britain and Italy	Classed as a full international by Italy only
