= Georges Coste =

French rugby union player & coach

- Born: 7 December 1944 (age 81) Corbère-les-Cabanes, Pyrénées-Orientales, Occitania, France
- Occupation: P.E. teacher

Rugby union career
- Position: Fly-half
Senior career
Years	Team	Apps	(Points)
- USA Perpignan
Coaching career
- Years: Team
- USA Perpignan
- 1993-1999: Italy

Georges Coste (born 7 December 1944 in Corbère-les-Cabanes) is a French rugby union coach and former player.

== Biography ==
Coste debuted playing as fly half in the local club U.S.A. Perpignan, and scored several caps for French junior national teams before his career was halted by a serious injury.

As a coach, he trained U.S.A. Perpignan, Frotignan and BUC (from Barcelona) clubs, and, in 1993, he replaced Bertrand Fourcade as coach of Italian national team. Under his lead Italy obtained several historical victories against Ireland (three times in 1995-1997), Scotland (1997) and France at 1995–97 FIRA Trophy, by 40-32, the later Italy's first victory against that team. These victories helped Italy to gain admittance to the Six Nations tournament starting from 2000.

Coste was fired by the Italian Federation a few months before the 1999 World Cup. Later he was assistant coach at Stade Français Paris.

Since 2006 he is supervisor of Italy's junior national teams.

Sporting positions
Preceded by (France) Bertrand Fourcade	Italy National Rugby Union Coach; 1993–1999	Succeeded by (Italy) Massimo Mascioletti
