= Loreto Cucchiarelli =

Italian rugby union player and coach (1943–2025)

Loreto Cucchiarelli (21 July 1943 – 24 August 2025) was an Italian rugby union player and a coach. He played as flanker.

== Biography ==
Cucchiarelli was born in Borgorose, in the province of Rieti on 21 July 1943. He played for L'Aquila Rugby, where he won the team first national championship title in 1966–67.

He had two caps for Italy, in 1966 and 1967, never scoring. He also played for Italy A and the U-23 National Team.

Cucchiarelli was more successful as a coach. He won two National Championship titles for L'Aquila Rugby in 1980–81 and 1981–82 and a Cup of Italy, in 1981. He later would be in charge of Italy National Teams in all categories, leading the first side from 1988 to 1989.

He was nominated Sports Director of L'Aquila Rugby for the season of 2007–08.

Cucchiarelli died on 24 August 2025, at the age of 82.

Sporting positions
Preceded by (Italy) Marco Bollesan	Italy National Rugby Union Coach; 1988–1989	Succeeded by (France) Bertrand Fourcade
