= Bertrand Fourcade =

French rugby union player and coach (1942–2024)

Bertrand Fourcade (27 December 1942 – 1 August 2024) was a French rugby union player, coach, and sports director. In competitive rugby he played as a fullback.

Fourcade had an average career as a player for FC Lourdes, where he won the French Championship, in 1967/68, and Stade Toulousain, never being capped for France.

He was more successful as a coach. He was in charge of FC Lourdes, when he was invited to become the coach of Italy, in 1989. He would be the coach of the Italian squad until 1993. During the 1991 Rugby World Cup, he achieved a win over the United States (30-9), but Italy was eliminated after the 1st round.

He was the coach of the France Universities national team, from 1996 to 2000.

Fourcade moved once more to Italy, where he would coach Unione Rugby Capitolina, from 2003/04 to 2004/05. He returned then to France, where he coached FC Lourdes, in 2008/09.

Bertrand Fourcade died on 1 August 2024, aged 81.

Sporting positions
Preceded by (Italy) Loreto Cucchiarelli	Italy National Rugby Union Coach; 1989–1993	Succeeded by (France) Georges Coste
