= Cuttitta Cup =

Annual trophy contested between Italy and Scotland since 2022

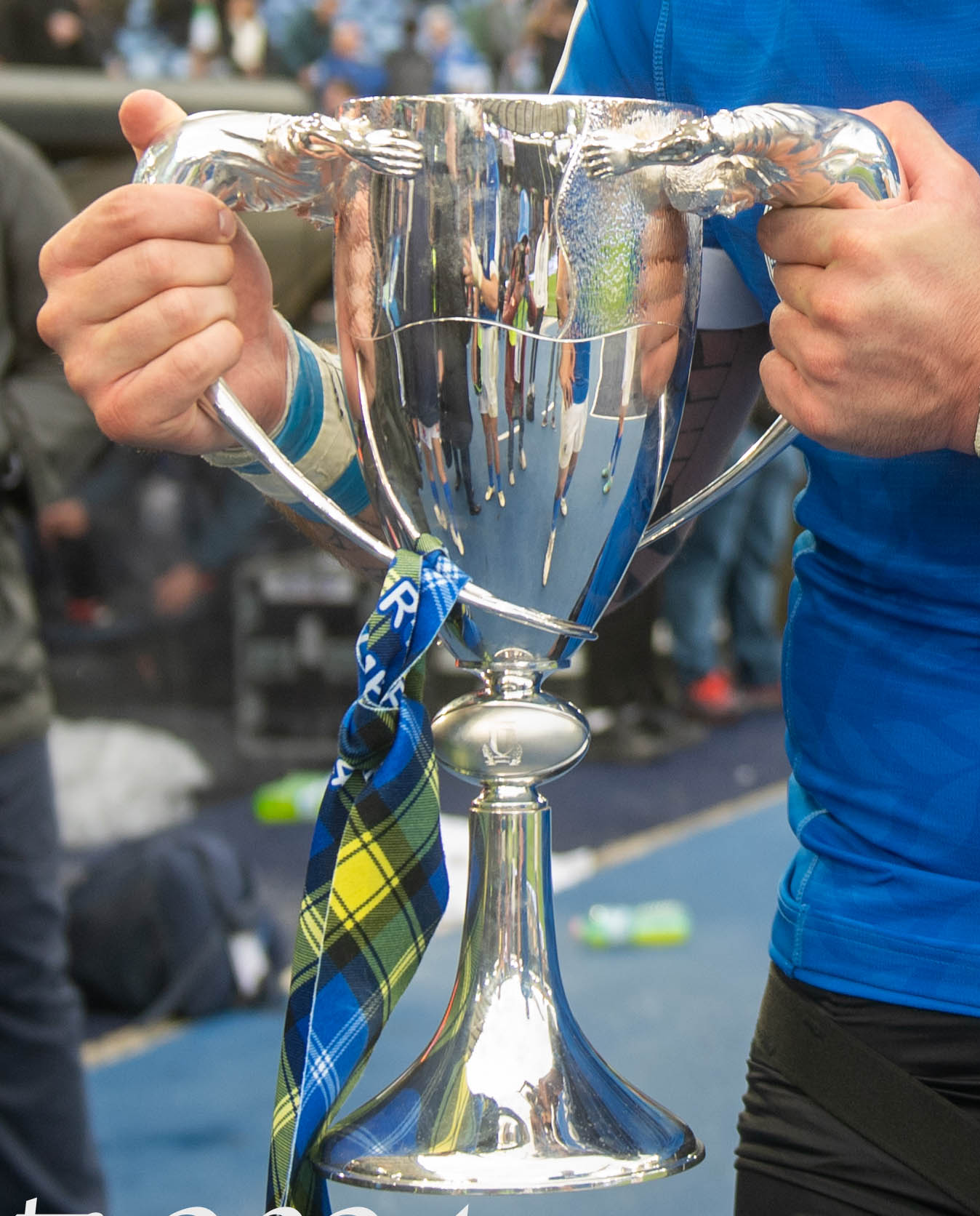
- Trophy
- Sport: Rugby union
- Instituted: 2022; 4 years ago
- Number of teams: 2
- Country: Italy; Scotland
- Holders: Italy (2026)
- Most titles: Scotland (3 titles)

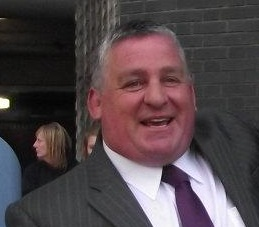
Massimo Cuttitta (1966–2021)

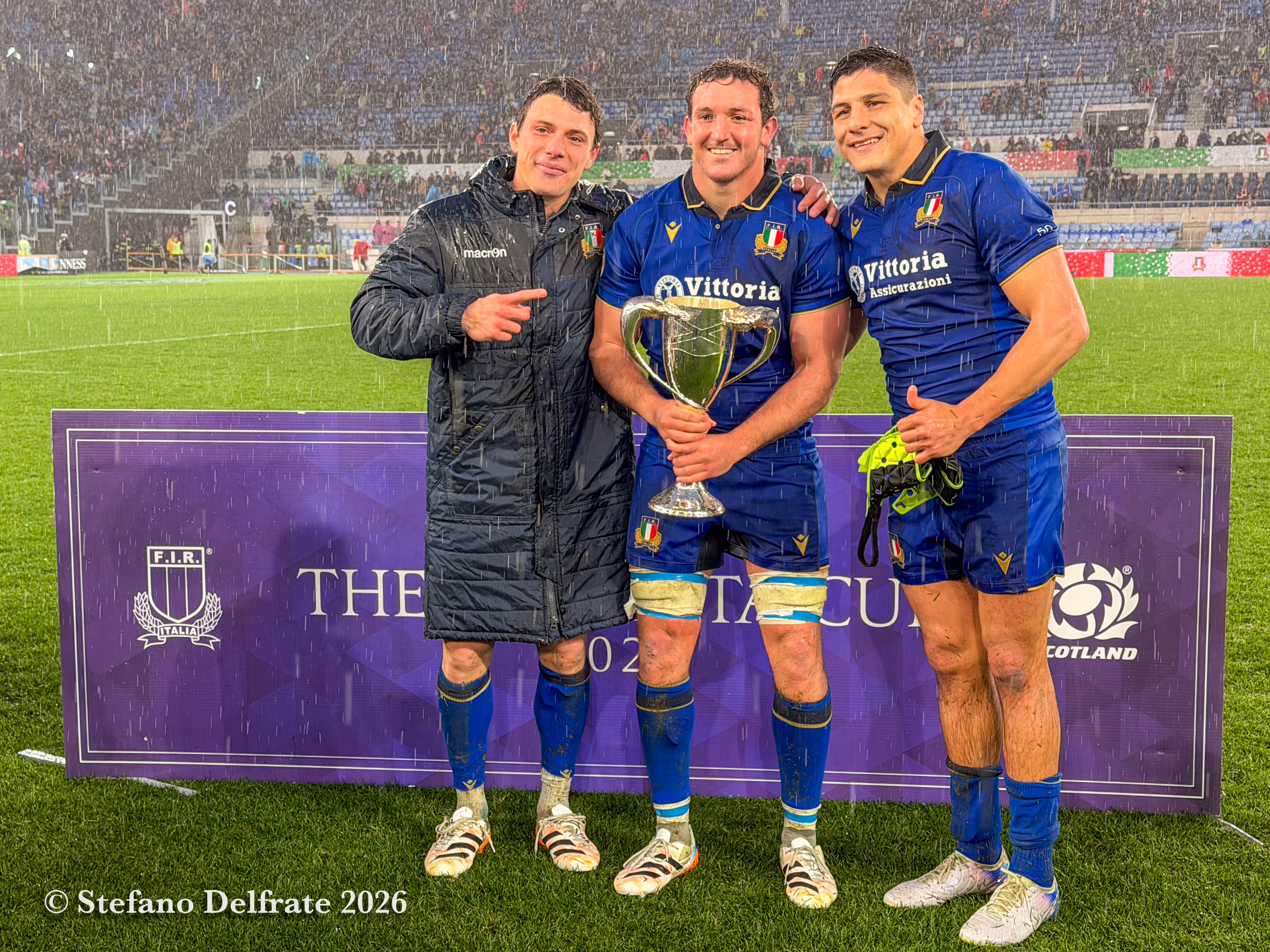
Italian player celebrating the trophy in 2026

The Cuttitta Cup is a trophy in rugby union awarded to the winner of the annual Six Nations Championship match between Italy and Scotland.

The trophy commemorates Massimo Cuttitta, a former Italian captain and Scotland scrum coach, who died of COVID-19 in 2021 at the age of 54. The title was first contested in 2022, following the 2022 Six Nations Championship match between the competing nations, and was presented by his brothers Marcello and Michele Cuttitta.

It was designed and manufactured from solid silver by Edinburgh jewellers Hamilton & Inches, who have also cared for the Calcutta Cup and crafted the Doddie Weir Cup. The handles of the cup represent two props, in memory of Massimo.

The establishment of this trophy results in Scotland competing for a trophy in every Six Nations match: Calcutta Cup (v England), Centenary Quaich (v Ireland), Auld Alliance Trophy (v France), Doddie Weir Cup (v Wales) and Cuttitta Cup (v Italy).

== Matches ==
Host nation	Played	Italy wins	Scotland wins	Drawn	Italy points	Scotland points
Italy	3	2	1	0	71	77
Scotland	2	0	2	0	33	57
Overall	5	2	3	0	104	134

== Results ==
Year	Date	Venue	Home	Score	Away	Trophy winner	Ref.
2022	12 March	Stadio Olimpico, Rome	Italy	22–33	Scotland	Scotland	
2023	18 March	Murrayfield Stadium, Edinburgh	Scotland	26–14	Italy	Scotland	
2024	9 March	Stadio Olimpico, Rome	Italy	31–29	Scotland	Italy	
2025	1 February	Murrayfield Stadium, Edinburgh	Scotland	31–19	Italy	Scotland	
2026	7 February	Stadio Olimpico, Rome	Italy	18–15	Scotland	Italy	

== See also ==
- Rugby union trophies and awards
