= 1988–89 Italy rugby union tour of Ireland =

Summary
| P | W | D | L |
Total
| 3 | 1 | 0 | 2 |
Test match
| 1 | 0 | 0 | 1 |
Opponent
| P | W | D | L |
Ireland
| 1 | 0 | 0 | 1 |

The 1989 Italy rugby union tour of Ireland was a series of matches played between December 1988 and January 1989 in Ireland by Italy national rugby union team.

It was an historical tour because the match against Ireland was the first official and "full international" test match for Italy against the national team of one of "Home Unions"

== Results ==
Scores and results list Italy's points tally first.

| Opposing Team | For | Against | Date | Venue | Status |
|---|---|---|---|---|---|
| Ireland Under-25 | 16 | 21 | 28 December 1988 | Ravenhill, Belfast | Tour match |
| Ireland | 15 | 31 | 31 December 1988 | Lansdowne Road, Dublin | Test match |
| Combined Province | 15 | 14 | 3 January 1989 | Cork | Tour match |
