= Italy national rugby union team =

Team representing Italy in men's international rugby union

Italy
- Nickname: Gli Azzurri (The Blues)
- Union: Italian Rugby Federation
- Head coach: Gonzalo Quesada
- Captain: Michele Lamaro
- Most caps: Sergio Parisse (142)
- Top scorer: Diego Domínguez (983)
- Top try scorer: Marcello Cuttitta (26)
- Home stadium: Stadio Olimpico
First colours	Second colours

World Rugby ranking
- Current: 11 (as of 3 November 2026)
- Highest: 8 (2007, 2024)
- Lowest: 15 (2015, 2017, 2018, 2019, 2020, 2021)

First international
- Spain 9–0 Italy (Barcelona, Spain; 20 May 1929)

Biggest win
- Italy 104–8 Czech Republic (Viadana, Italy, 18 May 1994)

Biggest defeat
- South Africa 101–0 Italy (Durban, South Africa, 19 June 1999)

World Cup
- Appearances: 10 (first in 1987)
- Best result: Pool stage (1987, 1991, 1995, 1999, 2003, 2007, 2011, 2015, 2019, 2023)
- Website: federugby.it

The Italy national rugby union team, nicknamed Gli Azzurri, represents Italy in men's international rugby union. They are administered by Italian Rugby Federation (FIR). Savoy blue is the common colour of the national teams representing Italy, as it is the traditional colour of the royal House of Savoy which reigned over the Kingdom of Italy from 1860 to 1946.

Italy has played international rugby since 1929, and for decades was considered one of the best European teams outside the Five Nations Championship. Since 2000, Italy has competed annually in the Six Nations Championship with England, France, Ireland, Scotland and Wales. In 2013, they were holders of the Giuseppe Garibaldi Trophy which is played annually between Italy and France. Italy is ranked 10th in the world by the IRB as of 15 March 2025.

Italian rugby rose to prominence in 2000 when it was added to the Five Nations, creating the Six Nations. Initially on the receiving end of some heavy defeats, as their 'golden generation' led by Diego Dominguez had aged out just before their ascension to the competition, the side grew in competitiveness. Following a period in the doldrums in which their continued participation was questioned, in 2022 the team beat Wales for their first win in 36 games. Italy has also since defeated Scotland and England, with New Zealand being the only major team Italy has yet to beat.

Italy have competed at every Rugby World Cup since the first tournament in 1987, where Italy played the inaugural game against New Zealand, but they are yet to progress beyond the first round. The team has developed a reputation for being a consistent 'middle man' at the tournament. Italy's results, since the inception of a new group stage formula in 2003, have consistently followed a pattern of two comfortable wins against Tier 2 teams and two comfortable losses against Tier 1 ones (although in 2019, the match against New Zealand was cancelled due to Typhoon Hagibis and a draw was awarded as result).

From 2026, as a Six Nations team, the Italians will compete biennially in a third competition, the Nations Championship, replacing summer and end-of-year international rugby matches with a structured cross-continental competition.

The current head coach is Gonzalo Quesada and the captain is currently Michele Lamaro.

== History ==
=== Early history: 1911–1934 ===
The first match played by an Italian XV was in 1911 between US Milanese and Voiron of France. On 25 July of the same year the "Propaganda Committee" was formed which in 1928 became the Federazione Italiana Rugby (FIR) (Italian Rugby Federation).

In May 1929, Italy played their first international losing 0–9 against Spain in Barcelona. In 1934, Italy was one of the founder members of FIRA, today's Rugby Europe; the others were France, Spain, Belgium, Portugal, Catalonia, Romania, Holland and Germany.

=== 1945–1985 ===
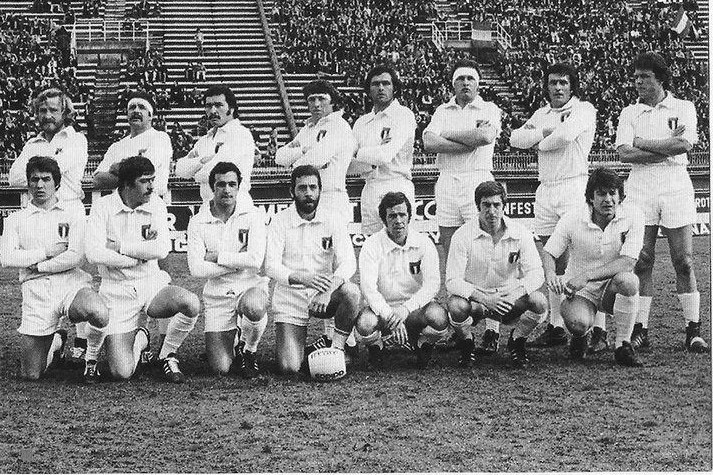
Lineup of the Italy national rugby union team vs France, 1975

World War II meant a hiatus for Italian rugby union, as it did in other rugby-playing nations. Post-war, there was a desire to return to normal and Italian rugby union entered a new dimension thanks to the help of Allied troops in Italy.

In the 1970s and 1980s rugby union made enormous progress thanks to great foreign players (John Kirwan, Naas Botha, David Campese, Michael Lynagh) and coaches (Julien Saby, Roy Bish, Greenwood, Nelie Smith) in the Italian championship. Even foreign coaches were and continue to be chosen for the national team, like Bertrande Fourcade and Georges Coste. In 1973, the national team went on a tour of South Africa, coached by ex-Springbok prop Amos Du Plooey. Tours of England and Scotland followed, as well as games against Australia and New Zealand, the masters of their day. In 1978, Italy first played Argentina at Rovigo, winning 19–6.

=== 1986–1999 ===
From the mid-1980s, Italy had been pursuing the ambition of playing in an expanded Five Nations Championship. Consistently winning against nations that now play in the European Nations Cup (Romania, Spain, Georgia, etc.), and good results against the major nations such as France, Scotland, Wales and Ireland meant that they were often talked as strong candidates.

In 1986, Italy hosted an England XV squad in Rome, drawing 15–15. The Azzurri took part in the first-ever Rugby World Cup match against New Zealand on 22 May 1987. The match proved a one-sided affair with New Zealand convincing 70–6 winners against a young Italy side. John Kirwan, later to become the Italy national coach, scored one of the tournament's greatest-ever tries for the All Blacks. Italy beat Fiji but lost to Argentina and finished third in their pool, failing to make the finals. In 1988, they played Ireland for the first time.

At the 1991 World Cup, Italy were grouped in a tough pool with England and the All Blacks. They lost both of these games but beat the United States. Italy first played Wales in 1994. At the 1995 World Cup in South Africa, Italy came close to beating England; losing 20–27, but recovered to beat Argentina. They finished third in their pool again below England and Western Samoa, but above the Argentines.

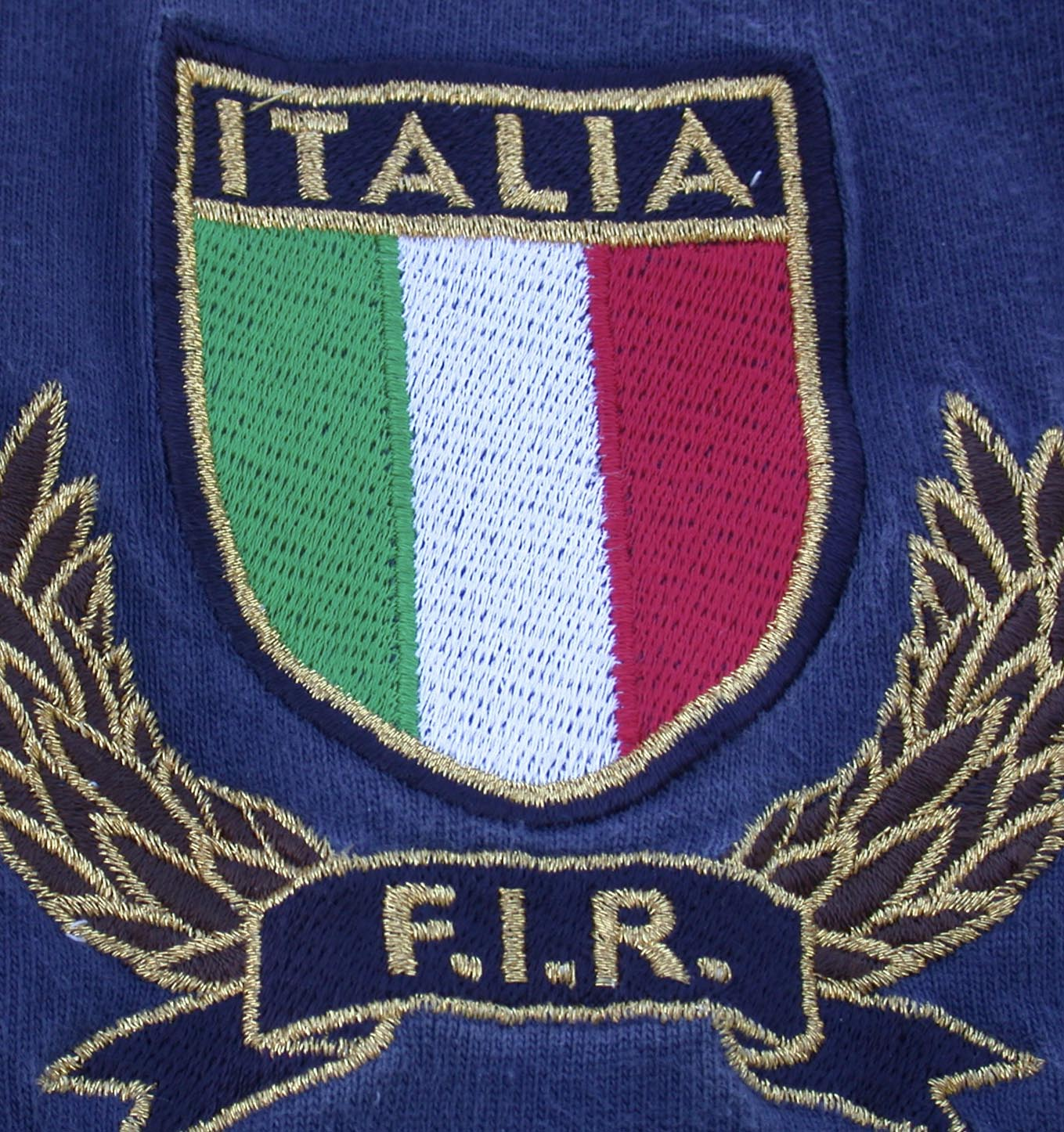
The current badge on the Italy jersey

The late 1990s saw the Italians build a formidable side and record Test victories over Five Nations opposition. In 1996, a deal between British Sky Broadcasting and the Rugby Football Union meant that England home games were exclusively shown on Sky. England were threatened with being expelled from the Five Nations to be replaced by Italy. This threat was never carried out as a deal was worked out.

In 1996, Italy toured England, Wales and for the first time Scotland, losing all matches. The team recorded two consecutive victories over Ireland in 1997; 37–29 on 4 January, at Lansdowne Road, and 37–22 on 20 December, in Bologna. On 22 March 1997 they recorded their first win over France, 40–32, (in Grenoble). In January 1998, Scotland were the victims with Italy winning 25–21 (in Treviso); in the same year in the Rugby World Cup Qualifiers, they narrowly lost 15–23 against England at Huddersfield, but they argued for a try by Alessandro Troncon disallowed by the referee.

At the 1999 World Cup, Italy were drawn with New Zealand for the third time and lost again. They did not win a single pool match and exited the tournament at the pool stage.

=== Six Nations era: 2000–present ===
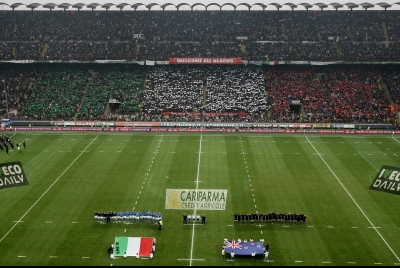
Italy vs the New Zealand All Blacks at the San Siro with a record 80,000 sellout crowd, November 2009

Italy finally joined the Six Nations Championship in 2000 but their admission coincided with the departure of some of their best players. Nevertheless, they won their opening game against the reigning champions Scotland 34–20. Thereafter they struggled to compete against the other nations and their participation was called into question. The 2001 and 2002 tournaments were particularly disappointing as they did not win a single game. Coach Brad Johnstone was sacked in 2002 after an alleged show of 'player power'.

John Kirwan was then appointed coach. They managed to win their second Six Nations game in 2003, a 30–22 victory over Wales, thus avoiding the wooden spoon. They followed up by winning two games at the World Cup, another first. The tournament was, however, ultimately disappointing as the Welsh gained revenge with a 27–15 success. This, coupled with defeat against New Zealand, meant that Italy were the only Six Nations country not to advance to the knock-out stage. Their third Six Nations win came against Scotland in 2004.

Italy, along with other nations, had made good use of IRB rules which allowed them to select foreign-born players if they had Italian ancestry or had lived in Italy for a qualifying period of three years. From 2004, they announced that they would only pick three such 'non-Italians' per team in order to develop their own domestic players.

In the 2005 Six Nations Italy finished bottom of the table again and failed to win a single game. Kirwan was sacked and replaced with Pierre Berbizier. Italy then went on a tour of Argentina where they surprised many by beating the Pumas 30–29 and drawing the series 1–1 (the only 2005 victory of a Northern Hemisphere team visiting a Southern Hemisphere team). However, the Pumas had their revenge when they visited Genoa and beat Italy 39–22.

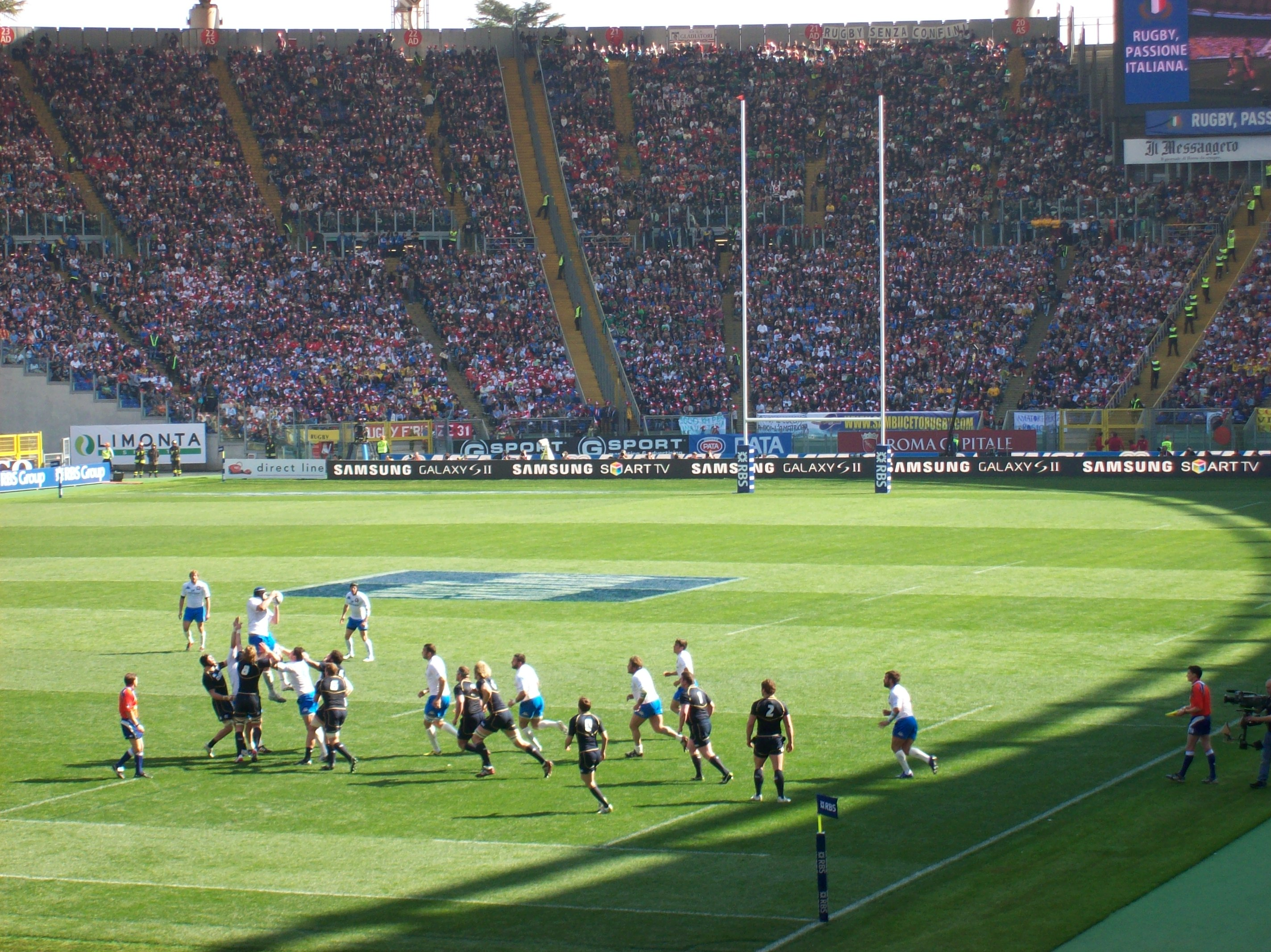
Italy contesting a lineout with Scotland during the 2012 Six Nations

In the 2006 Six Nations Championship Italy performed strongly against every team, leading against both England and France in the first half, but lost their first three games. They did, however, get a creditable 18–18 draw away to Wales, their first away point in the tournament, and were unlucky not to draw with Scotland in Rome in the final game, losing 10–13 courtesy of a late Scottish penalty.

In the 2007 Six Nations Championship, Italy started poorly, losing to France 3–39. However, Italy's performance improved, and they held England to a 20–7 result at Twickenham. Italy followed with a stunning start to their match at Murrayfield against Scotland, scoring three quick tries to give Italy a 21–0 lead after seven minutes, and the Azzurri went on to a 37–17 victory; their first-ever away win in the Six Nations. Italy's next match was against Wales in Rome, with Italy winning 23–20, for their first consecutive victories in the competition and help them achieve their highest-ever position in the competition. The domestic interest in rugby reached new heights with Italy's new success front page media coverage and the sport being held up as a model of fair play. Media and public interest in the national team was very high during the side's newfound success and on the final day a win could have seen them win their first ever six nations tournament. They needed a large win over ireland and other results to go their way. Italy were only 1 point behind at half time before they fell away in the 2nd half eventually losing 24–43. Despite losing their last game 10,000 fans later greeted the national team at Rome's Piazza del Popolo.

The 2008 Six Nations Championship saw Italy again finish in last place, albeit by only a three-point margin. They took part in close matches against Ireland, Wales England and France respectively and managed a sole victory, defeating Scotland 23–20 in Rome in the last round of matches. In the summer tests they lost to South Africa but again managed to surprise 3rd ranked Argentina with a 13–12 victory. At the 2008 end of year tour Italy pushed the Wallabies in their clash in Padova, but the Australians eventually went on to win 30–20. A week later Italy were defeated by Argentina, 14–22.

Italy's 2009 Six Nations campaign was ill-fated almost from the beginning, with both scrum-halves ruled out of the competition before a ball was kicked, and a third alternative ruled out of the opener at England due to injury. Head coach Nick Mallett tried flanker Mauro Bergamasco at scrum-half. Mallett's gamble failed in epic fashion, with Bergamasco's mistakes leading to three England tries before he was replaced at half-time; England went on to win 36–11. In week two Italy also put in a poor performance against Ireland losing 9–38. The two poor performances were followed by another loss to Scotland. The Azzurri were competitive in their 15–20 loss at the Flaminio to a Wales side resting many of its key players for the championship decider against Ireland the next week. Italy finished in last place for the second straight year after losing to France on the final weekend of the tournament.

In the 2010 Six Nations Championship, Italy were well beaten by Ireland 11–29 before narrowly losing to England and defeating Scotland. Italy were defeated in their last two matches against France and Wales.

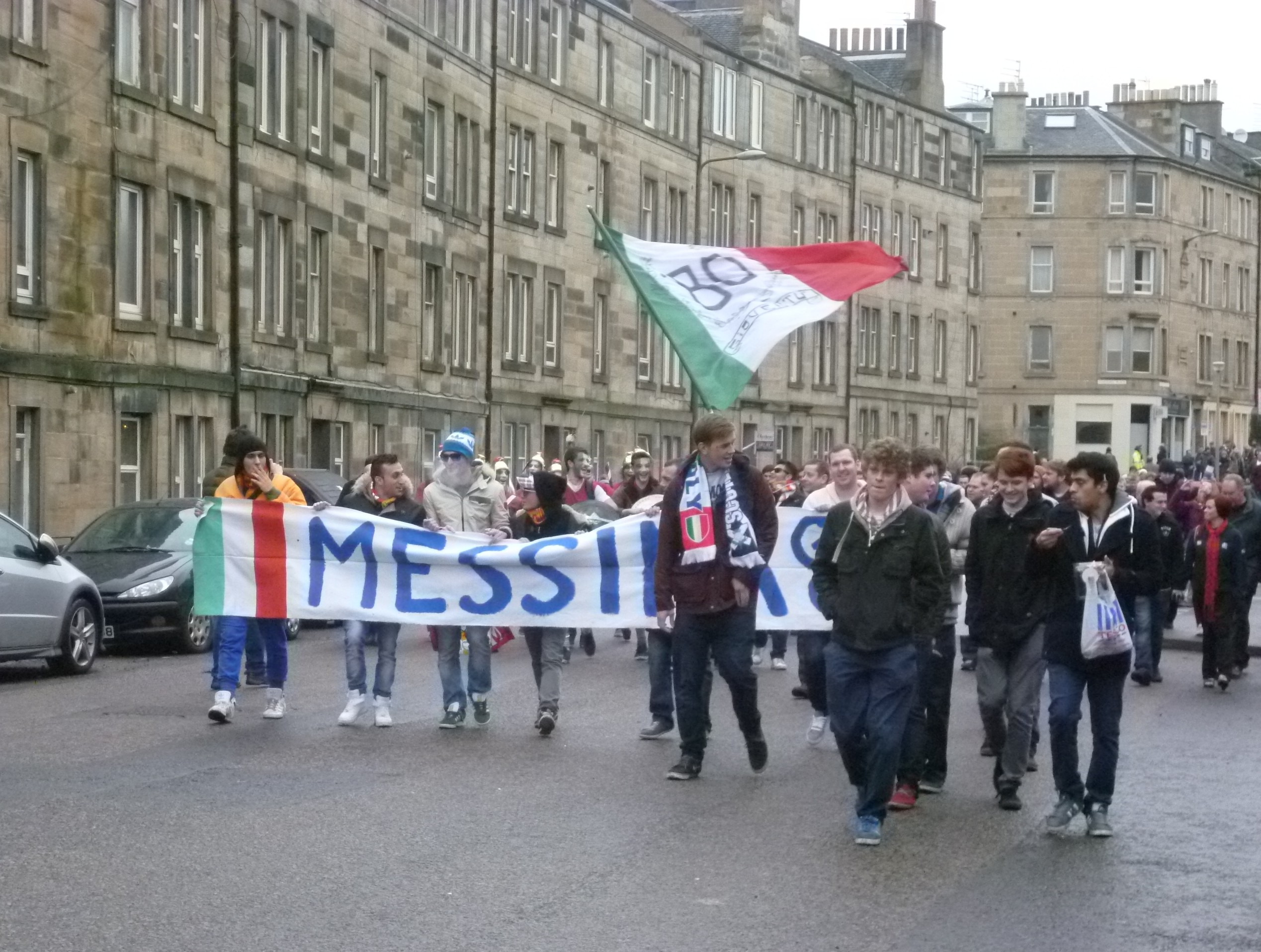
Italian fans on their way to see Italy play Scotland at Murrayfield in the Six Nations Championship, 2013

Italy finished the 2011 Six Nations with a 1–4 record. In the opening match of the 2011 Six Nations, Italy was beaten by Ireland 11–13 at home, with Ireland scoring a drop goal less than two minutes before the final whistle. The Azzurri claimed a 22–21 home victory over the reigning Six Nations champions, France, gaining Italy's first win over France in a Six Nations game. At the final whistle, the English language commentator declared it the greatest win in Italian rugby history thus far.

Italy finished the 2012 Six Nations in fifth place with a 1–4 record, following a 13–6 win over Scotland before over 72,000 fans at the Stadio Olimpico in Rome. Italy's 15–19 loss to England was their smallest margin of defeat. The championship also saw Italy lose to Wales, Ireland and France.

Italy played three matches in the 2012 November internationals, losing two and winning one. Italy lost to New Zealand and Australia 19–22, with Italian fly half Luciano Orquera missing a penalty in the last minute which would have secured Italy's first draw against Australia. Italy did manage a win in the series, beating Tonga 28–23.

Italy gained their second Six Nations win over France when they beat them 23–18 on their opening match of the 2013 Six Nations Championship. Three defeats by Scotland, Wales and England followed. On their final game of the championship Italy won against Ireland 22–15 for the first time in a Six Nations match in front of 75,000 fans at the Stadio Olimpico. Overall Italy finished fourth, behind Scotland in third on points difference, to make it one of their most successful Six Nations. In November 2013, Italy hosted Australia at Turin for a 20–50 loss, then defeated Fiji 37–31 at Cremona and was defeated by Argentina 14–19 at Rome.

Italy were whitewashed at the 2014 Six Nations Championship, including a 20–21 home loss to Scotland, a 7–46 loss to Ireland and an 11–52 loss to England. In June the team made an Asia-Pacific tour, where they were defeated by Fiji, Japan and Samoa. In November they scored a home win to Samoa, a two-point loss to Argentina and another loss to South Africa.

In the 2015 Six Nations Championship, Italy took a 22–19 away win over Scotland to avoid the wooden spoon, but suffered heavy home losses to France and Wales. At the 2015 Rugby World Cup, they defeated Romania and Canada but lost to Ireland and France, repeating their performance of the previous three editions.

After another poor performance in 2016, losing all their Six Nations matches, Italy hired former Ireland international and Harlequin F.C. coach Conor O'Shea to coach the team; with him they also hired IRFU developmental director Stephen Aboud to direct youth programs aimed at strengthening the level of rugby in the country. In June, Italy lost to Argentina and won over the United States and Canada. On 19 November, Italy achieved a famous upset victory by defeating South Africa 20–18 which was Italy's first win against the Springboks in 13 attempts at Stadio Artemio Franchi in Florence. This victory also marked their first win over one of the three big Southern Hemisphere nations (Australia, New Zealand, South Africa).

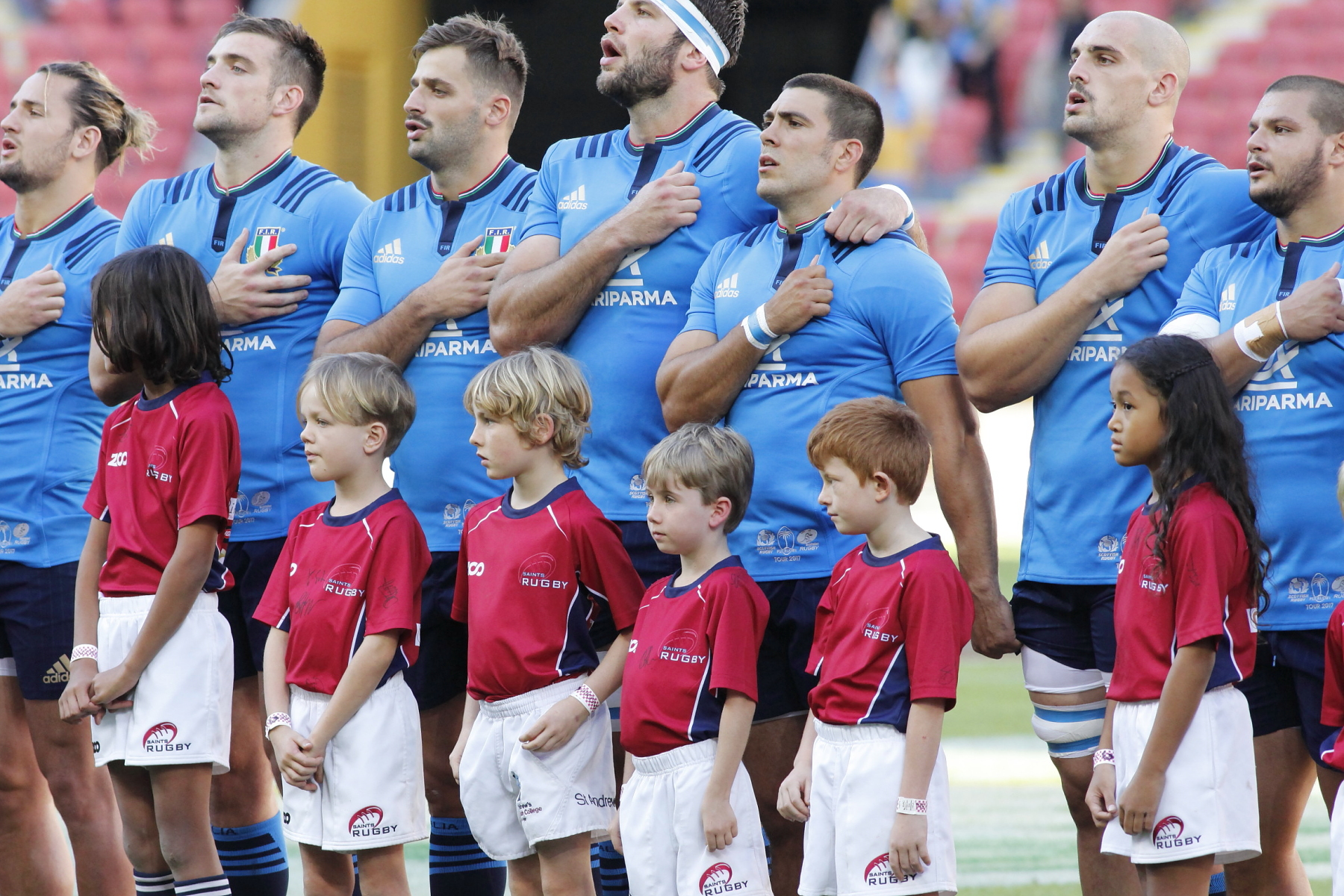
Italy players singing Il Canto degli Italiani before their Test match against Australia in 2017

Italy lost all their matches in the 2017, 2018, 2019, 2020 and 2021 Six Nations tournaments.

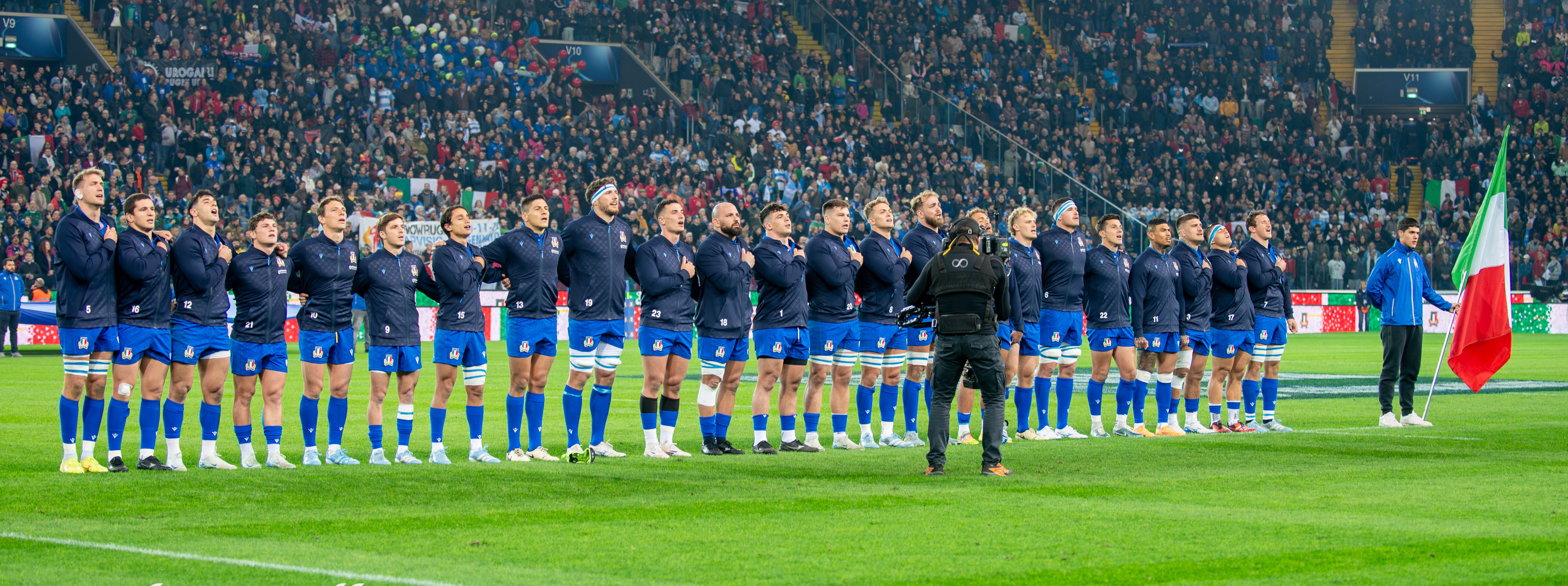
The Italian team ahead of their 2024 clash with Argentina

In their final match of the 2022 Six Nations Championship, Italy earned a historic victory over Wales, snapping a 36 match losing streak. They scored a try in the 80th minute with the conversion being the final act in the match as Gli Azzurri went on to win by a single point (22–21), at the Principality Stadium on 19 March 2022.

During the autumn tour in November 2022, Italy claimed 2 victories over 3 matches, defeating both Samoa and Australia (28–27), claiming their first ever victory over the Wallabies.

Italy put in a fine performance in the 2024 Six Nations Championship, pulling off a remarkable 13–13 draw away from home against France in round three. Italy narrowly missed out on victory when Paolo Garbisi's penalty hit the post after the ball had accidentally fallen off the kicking tee. The following round, Italy beat Scotland 31–29. This was Italy's first victory against Scotland in nine years and 12 years after their last victory on Italian soil against a British side. The 2024 campaign was Italy's best performance since the 2013 tournament during which they won two matches, against the French and then the Irish. These feats are all the more impressive given that Italy were pummelled by France at the last World Cup, and narrowly missed out on beating England in their opening match (24–27 defeat in Rome). Italy rounded off their tournament with a last-gasp victory over Wales (24–21), as they did 2 years ago, and for the first time since 2015 avoided last place. The win also represents the Italians' 4th away victory in the history of the competition, the 2nd time at Cardiff's Millennium Stadium, but above all it gives Gonzalo Quesada's men their best result since the integration of Italy 24 years earlier (2 wins and a draw for only 2 defeats).

The 2025 Six Nations Championship was more complicated for Italy, who won just one match, at home to Wales (22–15), and lost every other game, including a very heavy home defeat to France, winners of the competition (24–73), the heaviest defeat in their history at home to Les Bleus. Nonetheless, the home win over the Red Dragons enabled Gli Azzurri to avoid last place in the standings and the wooden spoon for the 2nd year running, at the expense of the Welsh.

The 2026 Six Nations Championship saw Italy match its best-ever finishes from 2007 and 2013 by finishing in 4th place, thanks to two home wins against Scotland in the opener (18-15) and, most notably, against England (23-18) on the penultimate matchday, an opponent against whom they had always lost in previous encounters. However, the Squadra Azzurra failed to build on this historic victory and secure a third consecutive win in the tournament for the first time in its history, suffering a heavy defeat on the final matchday in Wales following a disappointing performance (31-17).

== Wins against 'tier-one' teams ==
Wins against Tier 1 nations have included:

Date	Home	Score	Away	Place	Competition
24 October 1978	Italy	19–6	Argentina	Stadio Mario Battaglini, Rovigo	1978 Argentina tour of Great Britain, Ireland and Italy
6 May 1995	Italy	22–12	Ireland	Stadio comunale di Monigo, Treviso	1995 Ireland tour of Italy
4 June 1995	Argentina	25–31	Italy	Buffalo City Stadium, South Africa	1995 Rugby World Cup
3 January 1997	Ireland	29–37	Italy	Lansdowne Road, Dublin	1997 Italy tour of Ireland
22 March 1997	France	32–40	Italy	Stade Lesdiguières, Grenoble	1995–1997 FIRA Trophy
20 December 1997	Italy	37–22	Ireland	Stadio Renato Dall'Ara, Bologna	1997 Ireland tour of Italy
24 January 1998	Italy	25–21	Scotland	Stadio comunale di Monigo, Treviso	1998 Scotland tour of Italy
7 November 1998	Italy	23–19	Argentina	Stadio Comunale Beltrametti, Piacenza	1998 Argentina tour of Europe
5 February 2000	Italy	34–20	Scotland	Stadio Flaminio, Rome	2000 Six Nations Championship
15 February 2003	Italy	30–22	Wales	Stadio Flaminio, Rome	2003 Six Nations Championship
6 March 2004	Italy	20–14	Scotland	Stadio Flaminio, Rome	2004 Six Nations Championship
11 June 2005	Argentina	29–30	Italy	Estadio Olímpico, Córdoba	2005 Italy tour of Argentina
24 February 2007	Scotland	17–37	Italy	Murrayfield, Edinburgh	2007 Six Nations Championship
10 March 2007	Italy	23–20	Wales	Stadio Flaminio, Rome	2007 Six Nations Championship
15 March 2008	Italy	23–20	Scotland	Stadio Flaminio, Rome	2008 Six Nations Championship
28 June 2008	Argentina	12–13	Italy	Estadio Olímpico, Córdoba	2008 Italy tour of Argentina and South Africa
27 February 2010	Italy	16–12	Scotland	Stadio Flaminio, Rome	2010 Six Nations Championship
12 March 2011	Italy	22–21	France	Stadio Flaminio, Rome	2011 Six Nations Championship
17 March 2012	Italy	13–6	Scotland	Stadio Olimpico, Rome	2012 Six Nations Championship
3 February 2013	Italy	23–18	France	Stadio Olimpico, Rome	2013 Six Nations Championship
16 March 2013	Italy	22–15	Ireland	Stadio Olimpico, Rome	2013 Six Nations Championship
28 February 2015	Scotland	19–22	Italy	Murrayfield, Edinburgh	2015 Six Nations Championship
19 November 2016	Italy	20–18	South Africa	Stadio Artemio Franchi, Florence	2016 Autumn International
19 March 2022	Wales	21–22	Italy	Millennium Stadium, Cardiff	2022 Six Nations Championship
12 November 2022	Italy	28–27	Australia	Stadio Artemio Franchi, Florence	2022 Autumn International
26 August 2023 (Note: Japan was promoted to 'tier-one' status in 2020. The majority of Italy and Japan's meetings took place before that date.)	Italy	42–21	Japan	Stadio Comunale di Monigo, Treviso	2023 Rugby World Cup warm-up match
9 March 2024	Italy	31–29	Scotland	Stadio Olimpico, Rome	2024 Six Nations Championship
16 March 2024	Wales	21–24	Italy	Millennium Stadium, Cardiff	2024 Six Nations Championship
21 July 2024	Japan	14–42	Italy	Sapporo Dome, Sapporo	2024 Summer International
8 February 2025	Italy	22–15	Wales	Stadio Olimpico, Rome	2025 Six Nations Championship
8 November 2025	Italy	26–19	Australia	Bluenergy Stadium, Udine	2025 Quilter Nations Series
7 February 2026	Italy	18–15	Scotland	Stadio Olimpico, Rome	2026 Six Nations Championship
7 March 2026	Italy	23–18	England	Stadio Olimpico, Rome	2026 Six Nations Championship

Furthermore, Italy drew 18–18 with Argentina in Lourdes, France on 22 October 1997, 18–18 with Wales in Cardiff on 11 March 2006, and 13–13 with France in Villeneuve d'Ascq on 25 February 2024.

== Stadium and attendance ==
Before joining the Six Nations in 2000 Italy did not have a set stadium and played their home matches in various stadiums around Italy. From 2000 to 2011 Italy played all of their home Six Nations matches at the Stadio Flaminio in Rome. The Italian Rugby Federation (FIR) announced, in January 2010, that the stadium would undergo an expansion, that will increase its capacity to 42,000. Continued delays to the start of construction meant that the revamp could not be completed in time for the 2012 Six Nations so all of Italy's home Six Nations games were moved to the Stadio Olimpico, also in Rome. The expansion of the Stadio Flaminio was originally promised to be complete by 2014. It was planned that upon completion of the renovation, the team would move back to the Stadio Flaminio, however little was achieved and as of September 2016 the stadium was still in a state of abandoned disrepair. More Italians are attending rugby union games and whereas before most of the fans at the Stadio Flaminio were away fans. Since moving to the Stadio Olimpico attendances have increased by huge numbers. Italy has drawn large crowds since 2008, particularly for Six Nations matches and for matches against New Zealand:

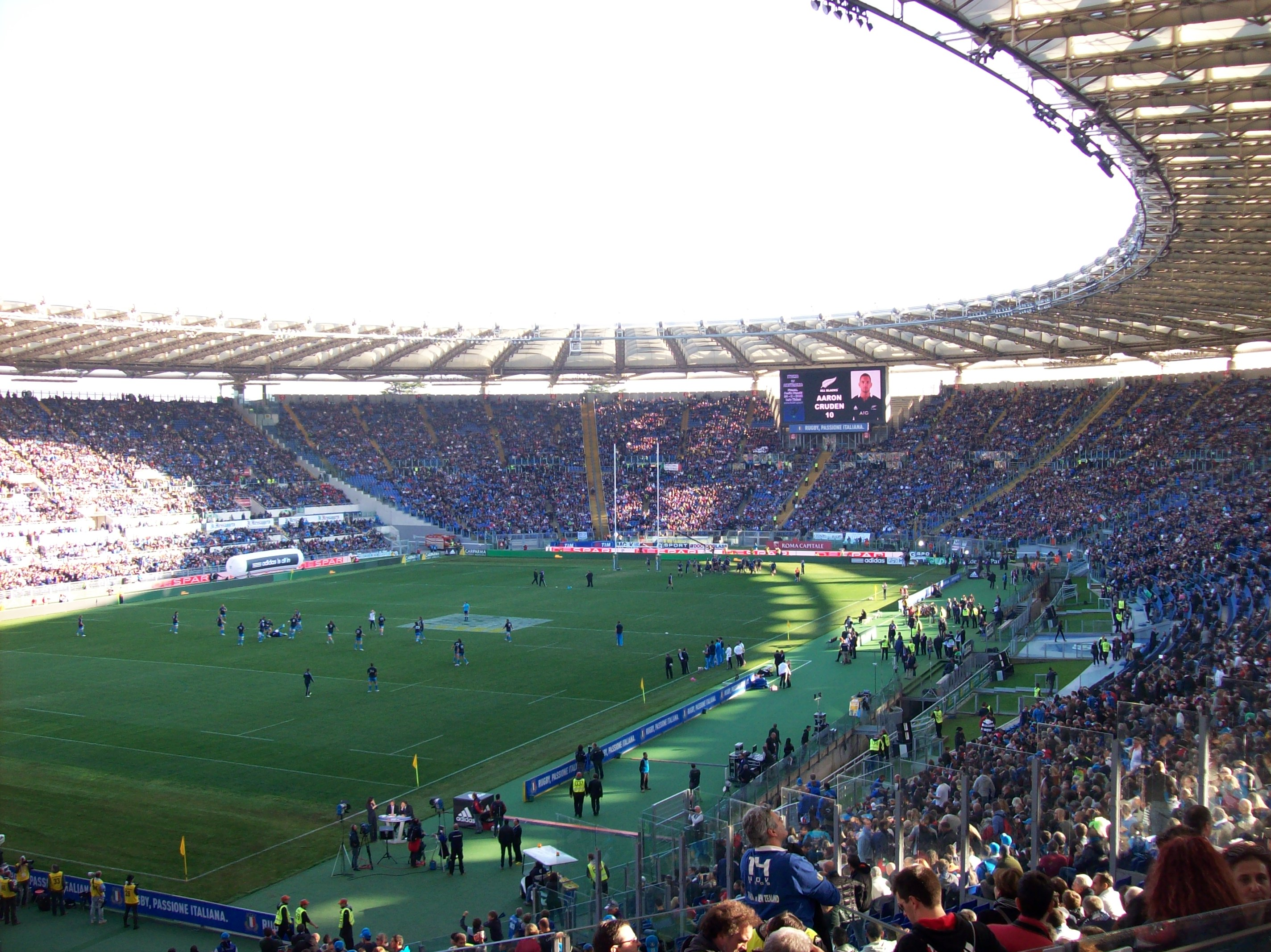
The Stadio Olimpico in Rome, current home of the Italian rugby team

Highest attended home matches
Rank	Attendance	Opponent	Date	Venue
1	80,074	New Zealand	14 November 2009	San Siro (Milan)
2	80,054	Ireland	16 March 2013	Stadio Olimpico (Rome)
3	73,526	Wales	23 February 2013	Stadio Olimpico (Rome)
4	73,000	New Zealand	17 November 2012	Stadio Olimpico (Rome)
5	72,354	Scotland	17 March 2012	Stadio Olimpico (Rome)
6	71,257	England	15 March 2014	Stadio Olimpico (Rome)
7	70,000	England	14 February 2016	Stadio Olimpico (Rome)
8	69,800	Scotland	9 March 2024	Stadio Olimpico (Rome)
9	68,985	England	7 March 2026	Stadio Olimpico (Rome)
10	68,981	Ireland	15 March 2025	Stadio Olimpico (Rome)

== Strip ==
Italy traditionally plays in 'Savoy blue' jerseys, white shorts and Savoy blue stockings at home. although the team have also used an all 'Savoy blue' kit in some seasons, or dark blue shorts. Its away uniform consists of a uniform with the inverted colours. Both uniforms have on the chest the Scudetto, although until the 1990s the non-test Italian teams had the coat of arms of the Maritime republics on the jersey. Both uniforms commonly have some trim in the colours of the nations flag, green, white and red.

Period	Kit manufacturer	Shirt sponsor
1981–1989	Adidas	None
1990–1993	Lotto	None
1991 Rugby World Cup		None
1993–1995	Gilbert	None
1995 Rugby World Cup		None
1996–1997	Reebok	None
1997 European Nations Cup	Reebok	None
1998–1999	None	None
1999	Cotton Oxford	None
2000 Six Nations – 2000 mid-year internationals	Canterbury	Alliance UniChem
2000 end-of-year internationals – 2002 mid-year internationals	Kappa	Alliance UniChem
2002 end-of-year internationals – 2006 end-of-year internationals	Kappa	Jaguar
2007 Six Nations championship – 2012 mid-year internationals	Kappa	Cariparma
2012 end-of-year internationals – 2017 mid-year internationals	Adidas	Cariparma
2017 end-of-year internationals – 2018 mid-year internationals	Macron	Cariparma
2018 end-of-year internationals – 2021 end-of-year-internationals	Macron	Cattolica Assicurazioni
2021 end-of-year internationals –	Macron	Suzuki
2022 Six Nations Tournament –	Macron	Bitpanda
2022 end-of-year internationals	Macron	Vittoria Assicurazioni

1970s Home	1987 Home	1991 Home	1995 Home	1995 Away	1999 Home	2000 Home	2000 Away

2001 Home	2003 Home	2007 Home	2007 Away	2011 Home	2012–13 Home	2012–13 Away	2013–14 Home	2013–14 Away

2014–16 Home	2015 RWC Home	2017 Home	2017 Away	2018 Home	2018 Away	2019 Home	2019 Away	2021 Home	2021 Away

== Awards ==
Competition	1st place, gold medalist(s)	2nd place, silver medalist(s)	3rd place, bronze medalist(s)	Total
Olympic Games	0	0	0	0
Rugby World Cup	0	0	0	0
European Nations Cup	1	9	8	18
Total	1	9	8	18

== Record ==
=== Overall ===
Men's World Rugby Rankings Top 20 as of 16 November 2026
Rank	Change (Note: Change from the previous week)	Team	Points
1	Steady	South Africa	91.53
2	Steady	New Zealand	90.65
3	▲1	France	89.05
4	▼1	Ireland	88.70
5	Steady	England	86.99
6	Steady	Scotland	85.28
7	Steady	Australia	82.24
8	Steady	Argentina	82.09
9	▲1	Wales	79.37
10	▼1	Fiji	77.79
11	Steady	Italy	75.84
12	Steady	Japan	75.25
13	Steady	Georgia	74.23
14	▲1	United States	68.39
15	▼1	Portugal	68.24
16	▲3	Samoa	67.60
17	▲1	Chile	67.00
18	▼2	Spain	66.53
19	▼2	Tonga	65.58
20	Steady	Uruguay	65.17

Italy's historical rankings

Source: World Rugby
Graph updated to 16 November 2026

Below is a table of the representative rugby matches played by an Italy national XV at test level up until 21 November 2026, updated after the match with Fiji.

Opponent	Played	Won	Lost	Drawn	Win %	For	Aga	Diff
Argentina	25	5	19	1	20%	431	663	−232
Australia	21	2	19	0	9.52%	315	734	−419
Australia XV	2	0	2	0	0%	36	75	−39
Belgium	2	2	0	0	100%	75	0	+75
Border Bulldogs	1	0	1	0	0%	12	25	−13
Bulgaria	1	1	0	0	100%	17	0	+17
Canada	10	8	2	0	80%	294	135	+159
Catalonia	2	1	0	1	50%	10	8	+2
Chile	1	1	0	0	100%	34	19	+15
Cook Islands	1	0	1	0	0%	6	15	−9
Croatia	1	1	0	0	100%	76	11	+65
Czech Republic	1	1	0	0	100%	104	8	+96
Czechoslovakia	12	10	1	1	83.33%	266	62	+204
England	33	1	32	0	3%	427	1,289	−862
England XV	1	0	0	1	0%	15	15	+0
England B	1	0	1	0	0%	9	21	−12
England U23	3	1	1	1	33.33%	31	42	−11
Fiji	13	6	7	0	46.15%	298	296	+2
France	52	3	48	1	5.77%	613	1,658	−1,045
France XV	30	1	28	1	3.33%	289	751	−462
France Espoirs	1	0	1	0	0%	18	21	−3
Georgia	4	3	1	0	75%	98	84	+14
Germany	6	2	4	0	33.33%	27	54	−27
Ireland	39	4	35	0	10%	568	1,374	−806
Japan	11	8	3	0	72.73%	335	208	+127
Leopards	3	2	1	0	66.67%	55	46	+9
Madagascar	2	2	0	0	100%	26	15	+11
Middlesex	1	0	1	0	0%	12	28	−16
Morocco	8	6	2	0	75%	184	52	+132
Golden Lions	1	0	1	0	0%	24	28	−4
Namibia	6	4	2	0	66.67%	247	110	+137
Sharks	1	0	1	0	0%	3	23	−20
Netherlands	4	4	0	0	100%	178	27	+151
New Zealand	18	0	18	0	0%	185	1,039	−854
New Zealand XV	1	0	1	0	0%	12	18	−6
Junior All Blacks	1	0	1	0	0%	13	30	−17
North-Eastern Cape	1	0	1	0	0%	12	31	−19
Northern Free State	1	0	1	0	0%	11	12	−1
Oxfordshire	1	0	1	0	0%	6	30	−24
Pacific Islanders	1	0	1	0	0%	17	25	−8
Poland	7	6	1	0	85.71%	165	49	+116
Portugal	13	11	1	1	84.62%	371	102	+269
Romania	44	25	16	3	56.82%	711	654	+57
Russia	5	5	0	0	100%	283	76	+207
Samoa	9	3	6	0	33%	183	225	−42
Scotland	39	10	29	0	26%	659	1,005	−346
Scotland A	3	1	2	0	33%	51	55	−4
Serbia and Montenegro	3	3	0	0	100%	60	22	+38
South Africa	20	1	19	0	5%	240	949	−709
Soviet Union	14	4	9	1	29%	171	165	+6
Spain	27	23	3	1	85%	581	187	+394
Steval Pumas	1	0	1	0	0%	12	39	−27
Sussex	1	0	1	0	0%	7	16	−9
Tonga	6	4	2	0	67%	190	96	+94
Tunisia	3	3	0	0	100%	60	19	+41
United States	5	5	0	0	100%	154	74	+80
Uruguay	5	5	0	0	100%	147	52	+95
Wales	35	5	29	1	14%	563	1,157	−594
West Germany	14	13	0	1	93%	226	69	+157
Zimbabwe	3	3	0	0	100%	70	25	+45
Total	578	209	354	15	36.16%	10,256	14,012	–3,756

=== Six Nations ===
Italy entered the International Championship in 2000 when it became the Six Nations, and made a positive start by winning their debut match 34–20 against Scotland. They finished fifth in 2003 above Wales in the final standings, having defeated them 30–22, and were again fifth the following year above Scotland, after beating them 20–14. In 2006, Italy drew with Wales 18–18 at the Millennium Stadium in Cardiff.

Italy's first three Six Nations match victories, in 2000, 2003, and 2004, had been in front of a home crowd at the Stadio Flaminio in Rome. However, on 24 February 2007, they defeated Scotland 37–17 at Murrayfield for their first away win in the competition, having taken advantage of multiple early errors by the home side and taking a 21–0 lead within 7 minutes. Two weeks later, they defeated Wales for the second time, 23–20 back in Rome. This was the first time that Italy had won two of their five games in the championship, and they finished the 2007 Six Nations Championship in fourth place.

Italy won the Giuseppe Garibaldi Trophy for the first time in 2011 with a close-fought 22–21 victory over France. Two years later, they lifted the trophy for a second time by defeating France 23–18. Italy also recorded a first Six Nations victory over Ireland in 2013, beating them 22–15, and equalling their best finish of fourth place in the final standings. On 28 February 2015, Italy achieved their second away win against Scotland, a tight 22–19 victory, and after a 36-match losing streak they won in Wales for the first time on 19 March 2022 by 22–21. Italy put in their best performance yet at the 2024 6 Nations tournament, with 2 wins (31–29 at home against Scotland, to win the Cuttitta Cup, and 24–21 away against Wales) and a draw (13–13 away against France).

As of March 2026, Italy have won 18 Six Nations matches: 9 of these against Scotland, 5 against Wales, two against France and one against Ireland and England respectively.

Year	Pos	W	D	L	PF	PA	PD	FRA	ENG	(Ireland) IRL	WAL	SCO
2000	6th	1	0	4	106	228	−122	L	L	L	L	W
2001	6th	0	0	5	106	207	−101	L	L	L	L	L
2002	6th	0	0	5	70	183	−113	L	L	L	L	L
2003	5th	1	0	4	100	185	−85	L	L	L	W	L
2004	5th	1	0	4	42	152	−110	L	L	L	L	W
2005	6th	0	0	5	55	179	−124	L	L	L	L	L
2006	6th	0	1	4	72	125	−53	L	L	L	D	L
2007	4th	2	0	3	94	147	−53	L	L	L	W	W
2008	6th	1	0	4	74	131	−57	L	L	L	L	W
2009	6th	0	0	5	49	170	−121	L	L	L	L	L
2010	6th	1	0	4	69	137	−68	L	L	L	L	W
2011	6th	1	0	4	70	138	−68	W	L	L	L	L
2012	5th	1	0	4	53	121	−68	L	L	L	L	W
2013	4th	2	0	3	75	111	−36	W	L	W	L	L
2014	6th	0	0	5	63	172	−109	L	L	L	L	L
2015	5th	1	0	4	62	182	−120	L	L	L	L	W
2016	6th	0	0	5	79	224	−145	L	L	L	L	L
2017	6th	0	0	5	50	201	−151	L	L	L	L	L
2018	6th	0	0	5	92	203	−111	L	L	L	L	L
2019	6th	0	0	5	79	167	−88	L	L	L	L	L
2020	6th	0	0	5	44	178	−134	L	L	L	L	L
2021	6th	0	0	5	55	239	−184	L	L	L	L	L
2022	6th	1	0	4	60	181	−121	L	L	L	W	L
2023	6th	0	0	5	89	149	−60	L	L	L	L	L
2024	5th	2	1	2	92	126	−34	D	L	L	W	W
2025	5th	1	0	4	106	188	−82	L	L	L	W	L
2026	4th	2	0	3	79	117	–38	L	W	L	L	W
Overall		18	2	115	1,985	4,541	-2,556	2–1–24	1–0–26	1–0–26	5–1–21	9–0–18

	England	France	Ireland	Italy	Scotland	Wales
Tournaments	130	97	132	27	132	132
Outright wins (shared wins)
Home Nations	5 (4)	—N/a	4 (3)	—N/a	9 (2)	7 (3)
Five Nations	17 (6)	12 (8)	6 (5)	—N/a	5 (6)	15 (8)
Six Nations	7	8	6	0	0	6
Overall	29 (10)	20 (8)	16 (8)	0 (0)	14 (8)	28 (11)
Grand Slams
Home Nations	—N/a	—N/a	—N/a	—N/a	—N/a	2
Five Nations	11	6	1	—N/a	3	6
Six Nations	2	4	3	0	0	4
Overall	13	10	4	0	3	12
Triple Crowns
Home Nations	5	—N/a	2	—N/a	7	6
Five Nations	16	—N/a	4	—N/a	3	11
Six Nations	5	—N/a	9	—N/a	0	5
Overall	26	—N/a	15	—N/a	10	22
Wooden Spoons
Home Nations	7	—N/a	10	—N/a	5	6
Five Nations	10	12	15	—N/a	15	10
Six Nations	0	1	0	18	4	4
Overall	17	13	25	18	24	20

=== Rugby World Cup ===
Rugby World Cup record									Qualification						
Year	Round	Pld	W	D	L	PF	PA	Squad	Pos	Pld	W	D	L	PF	PA
(New Zealand) (Australia) 1987	Pool stage	3	1	0	2	40	110	Squad	Invited						
(England) (France) (Ireland) (Scotland) (Wales) 1991	Pool stage	3	1	0	2	57	76	Squad	1st	3	3	0	0	83	38
(South Africa) 1995	Pool stage	3	1	0	2	69	94	Squad	2nd	4	3	0	1	210	52
(Wales) 1999	Pool stage	3	0	0	3	35	196	Squad	2nd	6	5	0	1	302	92
(Australia) 2003	Pool stage	4	2	0	2	77	123	Squad	1st	2	2	0	0	75	20
(France) 2007	Pool stage	4	2	0	2	85	117	Squad	1st	2	2	0	0	150	7
(New Zealand) 2011	Pool stage	4	2	0	2	92	95	Squad	Automatically qualified						
(England) 2015	Pool stage	4	2	0	2	74	88	Squad	Automatically qualified						
(Japan) 2019	Pool stage	4	2	1	1	98	78	Squad	Automatically qualified						
(France) 2023	Pool stage	4	2	0	2	114	181	Squad	Automatically qualified						
(Australia) 2027	Qualified								Automatically qualified						
(United States) 2031	To be determined								To be determined						
Total	—	36	15	1	20	741	1158	—	—	17	15	0	2	820	209
Champions; Runners–up; Third place; Fourth place; Home venue

During Typhoon Hagibis; New Zealand v Italy was to be cancelled and recorded as 0–0 draw

Italy have competed at every Rugby World Cup since the competition's inception in 1987. Italy finished third in their pool at their first World Cup, defeating Fiji, but not making the finals. They did not make the finals in 1991, grouped in a tough pool with England and the All Blacks. At the 1995 Rugby World Cup in South Africa, they finished behind England and Western Samoa, but above Argentina in their pool.

In 1999 they did not make the finals, with their defeats by the All Blacks and Tonga. Italy won two pool games at the 2003 World Cup, defeating both Canada and Tonga, but lost to the All Blacks and Wales. Italy played the 2007 Rugby World Cup in Pool C, against New Zealand, Scotland, Romania and Portugal (who had been beaten 83–0 by Italy in the qualifiers), with the goal of reaching the quarter finals for the first time. However, in the crucial group match against Scotland, Italy were undone by indiscipline. Chris Paterson kicked all of Scotland's points in an 18–16 victory, despite Italy crossing the line for the game's only try.

=== Nations Championship ===
Year	Pos	W	D	L	PF	PA	PD	ARG	AUS	FIJ	JAP	NZL	RSA
2026	TBD	0	0	6	74	237	−163	L	L	L	L	L	L
Overall		0	0	6	74	237	−163	0-0-1	0–0–1	0-0-1	0-0-1	0-0-1	0-0-1

=== European championships ===
Before 2000, Italy was one of the leading European teams outside the Five Nations, along with Romania, and for a while the USSR.

Italy competed in the original European Championships from 1936 to 1938, but World War II meant that the tournament would not resume until 1952. Italy then competed in these tournaments from 1952 to 2000. Italy achieved only one victory, the 1995–97 FIRA Trophy.

Team	First place	Second place	Third place
Italy	1	9	8

==== Thirties wins ====
Year	Host city	Winner	Second place	Third place
1936	Berlin	France	Germany	Italy
1937	Paris	France	Italy	Germany

==== The fifties: the European Cup, Italian positions ====
Year	Winner	Second place	Third place
1952	France	Italy	West Germany
1954	France	Italy	Spain

==== The Nations Cup 1966–73 ====
Year	Winner	Second place	Third place
1965/1966	France	Italy	Romania
1966/1967	France	Romania	Italy
1969/1970	France	Romania	Italy

==== The FIRA Trophy 1974–97 ====
Year	Winner	Second place	Third place
1974/1975	Romania	France	Italy
1975/1976	France	Italy	Romania
1976/1977	Romania	France	Italy
1979/1980	France	Romania	Italy
1981/1982	France	Italy	Romania
1982/1983	Romania	Italy	Soviet Union
1983/1984	France	Romania	Italy
1984/1985	France	Soviet Union	Italy
1990/1992	France	Italy	Romania
1992/1994	France	Italy	Romania
1995/1997	Italy	France	Romania

== Players ==
=== Current squad ===
On 21 October, Italy named a 34-player squad ahead of the 2026 Nations Championship Northern Hemisphere Series. The squad was updated on 25 October due to some injuries with the respective clubs.

Head coach: (Argentina) Gonzalo Quesada

- Caps updated: 14 November 2026 (after Italy v Argentina)

Player	Position	Date of birth (age)	Caps	Club/province
Tommaso Di Bartolomeo	Hooker	4 January 2001 (age 25)	13	(Italy) Zebre Parma
Gianmarco Lucchesi	Hooker	10 September 2000 (age 26)	37	(France) Toulon
Giacomo Nicotera	Hooker	15 July 1996 (age 30)	43	(France) Stade Français Paris
Simone Ferrari	Prop	28 March 1994 (age 32)	75	(Italy) Benetton
Danilo Fischetti	Prop	26 January 1998 (age 28)	68	(England) Northampton Saints
Muhamed Hasa	Prop	10 September 2001 (age 25)	13	(Italy) Zebre Parma
Ion Neculai	Prop	25 January 2001 (age 25)	5	(England) Northampton Saints
Ivan Nemer	Prop	22 April 1998 (age 28)	16	(Italy) Benetton
Marco Riccioni	Prop	19 October 1997 (age 29)	40	(France) Perpignan
Niccolò Cannone	Lock	17 May 1998 (age 28)	67	(Italy) Benetton
Mattia Midena	Lock	19 May 2005 (age 21)	0	(Italy) Benetton
Enoch Opoku-Gyamfi	Lock	3 March 2006 (age 20)	3	(England) Bath
Federico Ruzza	Lock	4 August 1994 (age 32)	76	(Italy) Benetton
Lorenzo Cannone	Back row	28 January 2001 (age 25)	42	(Italy) Benetton
Samuele Locatelli	Back row	30 July 2001 (age 25)	1	(Italy) Zebre Parma
Alessandro Ortombina	Back row	5 October 2002 (age 24)	4	(Italy) Zebre Parma
Ross Vintcent	Back row	5 June 2002 (age 24)	24	(England) Exeter Chiefs
Manuel Zuliani	Back row	26 April 2000 (age 26)	45	(Italy) Benetton
Alessandro Fusco	Scrum-half	28 October 1999 (age 27)	28	(Italy) Zebre Parma
Alessandro Garbisi	Scrum-half	11 April 2002 (age 24)	26	(Italy) Benetton
Stephen Varney	Scrum-half	15 May 2001 (age 25)	41	(England) Exeter Chiefs
Tommaso Allan	Fly-half	26 April 1993 (age 33)	93	(Italy) Zebre Parma
Paolo Garbisi	Fly-half	26 April 2000 (age 26)	59	(France) Perpignan
Leonardo Marin	Centre	23 February 2002 (age 24)	27	(Italy) Benetton
Damiano Mazza	Centre	16 February 1999 (age 27)	0	(Italy) Zebre Parma
Federico Mori	Centre	13 October 2000 (age 26)	18	(France) Bayonne
Paolo Odogwu	Centre	18 February 1997 (age 29)	12	(Italy) Benetton
Mirko Belloni	Wing	4 June 2004 (age 22)	4	(Italy) Zebre Parma
Monty Ioane	Wing	30 October 1994 (age 32)	51	(France) Lyon
Louis Lynagh	Wing	3 December 2000 (age 25)	16	(Italy) Benetton
Federico Zanandrea	Wing	30 January 2005 (age 21)	0	(Italy) Benetton
Ange Capuozzo	Fullback	30 April 1999 (age 27)	34	(France) Stade Toulousain
Matt Gallagher	Fullback	26 October 1996 (age 30)	3	(Italy) Benetton
Giovanni Montemauri	Fullback	24 October 2000 (age 26)	0	(Italy) Zebre Parma

=== Award winners ===
==== World Rugby Awards ====
The following Italy players have been recognised at the World Rugby Awards since 2001:

World Rugby Player of the Year
Year	Nominees	Winners
2008	Sergio Parisse	—
2013	Sergio Parisse (2)	—

World Rugby Breakthrough Player of the Year
Year	Nominees	Winners
2022	Ange Capuozzo	Ange Capuozzo

==== Six Nations Player of the Championship ====
The following Italy players have been shortlisted for the Six Nations Player of the Championship since 2004:

Six Nations Player of the Year (2004–07)
Year	Nominees	Winners
2004	Martín Castrogiovanni	—
2004	Andrea de Rossi	—
2004	Sergio Parisse	—
2005	Marco Bortolami	—
2005	Alessandro Troncon	—
2006	Mirco Bergamasco	—
2006	Ramiro Pez	—
2007	Marco Bortolami (2)	—
2007	Carlos Nieto	—

Six Nations Player of the Year (2008–14)
Year	Nominees	Winners
2008	Sergio Parisse (2)	—
2009	Sergio Parisse (3)	—
2011	Andrea Masi	Andrea Masi
2011	Fabio Semenzato	Andrea Masi
2012	Sergio Parisse (4)	—
2013	Andrea Masi (2)	—
2013	Sergio Parisse (5)	—
2013	Alessandro Zanni	—
2014	Leonardo Ghiraldini	—

Six Nations Player of the Year (2015–26)
Year	Nominees	Winners
2015	Sergio Parisse (6)	—
2016	Sergio Parisse (7)	—
2017	Sergio Parisse (8)	—
2018	Matteo Minozzi	—
2024	Tommaso Menoncello	Tommaso Menoncello
2025	Tommaso Menoncello (2)	—
2026	Tommaso Menoncello (3)	TBD

Six Nations Team of the Championship
Year	Forwards		Backs		Total
Year	No.	Players	No.	Players	Total
2024	7.	Michele Lamaro	12.	Tommaso Menoncello	2
2025	—		12.	Tommaso Menoncello (2)	1
2026	2.	Giacomo Nicotera	13.	Tommaso Menoncello (3)	3
2026	3.	Simone Ferrari	13.	Tommaso Menoncello (3)	3

Six Nations Try of the Championship
Year	Nominee	Match	Winner	Ref
2023	Pierre Bruno	vs. Ireland	—	
2024	Lorenzo Pani	vs. Wales	Lorenzo Pani	
2025	Ross Vintcent	vs. England	—	

== Coaches ==
=== Current coaches ===
- (Argentina) Gonzalo Quesada (Head Coach)
- (England) Richard Hodges (Defence)
- (Italy) Andrea Moretti (Forwards)
- (France) Philippe Doussy (Skills)
- (Argentina) Germán Fernández (Breakdown)
- (Italy) Sergio Parisse (Lineout)

=== Coaching history ===
Name	From	To	P	W	D	L	% W/P
(Italy) Arnaldo Cortese (England) John Thomas	20 May 1929	–	1	0	0	1	0
(Italy) Arturo Cameroni (Italy) Luigi Bricchi	29 May 1930	–	1	1	0	0	100
(Italy) Luigi Bricchi	1 November 1932	26 December 1934	4	3	0	1	75.00
(Italy) Luigi Bricchi (France) Julien Saby	26 December 1934	7 April 1935	1	1	0	0	100
(France) Julien Saby	7 April 1935	14 May 1936	2	0	0	2	0
(Italy) Luigi Bricchi (France) Michel Boucheron	14 May 1936	16 May 1936	2	1	0	1	50.00
(Italy) Luigi Bricchi (France) Julien Saby	1 January 1937	17 October 1937	5	2	1	2	40.00
(Italy) Luigi Bricchi	6 March 1938	20 November 1938	1	0	0	1	0
(Italy) Luigi Bricchi (Italy) Giuseppe Sessa	20 November 1938	19 March 1940	2	1	0	1	50.00
(Italy) Romano Bonifazi	19 March 1940	9 February 1941	2	1	0	1	50.00
(Italy) Luigi Bricchi (Italy) Franco Chiaserotti	9 February 1941	2 May 1942	–	–	–	–	–
(Italy) Luigi Bricchi (Italy) Franco Chiaserotti	2 May 1942		1	1	0	0	100
(Italy) Tommaso Fattori	18 May 1947	27 March 1949	2	1	0	1	50.00
(Italy) Giorgio Briasco (Italy) Antonio Radicini	27 March 1949	26 February 1950	2	0	0	2	0
(Italy) Romano Bonifazi	26 February 1950	29 July 1950	–	–	–	–	–
(Italy) Francesco Vinci	29 July 1950	4 October 1950	–	–	–	–	–
(Italy) Renzo Maffioli	4 October 1950	25 February 1951	–	–	–	–	–
(Italy) Renzo Maffioli (France) Julien Saby	25 February 1951	1 August 1954	9	6	0	3	66.67
(Italy) Piermarcello Farinelli (Italy) Aldo Invernici (Italy) Umberto Silvestri	1 August 1954	22 December 1956	8	5	0	3	62.50
(Italy) Giulio Fereoli (Italy) Aldo Invernici (Italy) Umberto Silvestri	22 December 1956	8 December 1957	2	1	0	1	50.00
(Italy) Sergio Barilari (Italy) Aldo Invernici (Italy) Umberto Silvestri	8 December 1957	19 July 1958	1	0	0	1	0
(Italy) Sergio Barilari (Italy) Mario Battaglini (Italy) Aldo Invernici	19 July 1958	10 April 1960	2	1	0	1	50.00
(Italy) Sergio Barilari (Italy) Romano Bonifazi	10 April 1960	22 April 1962	4	2	0	2	50.00
(Italy) Aldo Invernici	22 April 1962	8 December 1965	7	2	0	5	28.57
(Italy) Sergio Barilari (Italy) Mario Martone	8 December 1965	28 October 1967	7	3	1	3	42.86
(Italy) Aldo Invernici	28 October 1967	24 May 1970	8	7	0	1	87.50
(Italy) Giordano Campice	24 May 1970	25 October 1970	2	2	0	0	100
(Italy) Sergio Barilari	25 October 1970	10 April 1971	3	0	0	3	0
(Italy) Guglielmo Geremia	11 April 1971	27 May 1971	1	0	0	1	0
(Italy) Aldo Invernici	28 May 1971	19 February 1972	–	–	–	–	–
(Italy) Umberto Levorato	20 February 1972	25 November 1972	4	1	2	1	25.00
(Italy) Gianni Villa	26 November 1972	14 February 1975	20	6	1	13	30.00
(Wales) Roy Bish	15 February 1975	1º April 1977	15	8	1	6	53.33
(Italy) Isidoro Quaglio	2 April 1977	1º May 1977	2	1	0	1	50.00
(Wales) Gwyn Evans	23 October 1977	23 October 1978	5	1	1	3	20.00
(France) Pierre Villepreux	24 October 1978	24 October 1981	24	10	1	13	41.67
(Italy) Paolo Paladini (Italy) Marco Pulli	25 October 1981	9 November 1985	28	16	2	10	57.14
(Italy) Marco Bollesan	10 November 1985	4 November 1988	19	7	1	11	36.84
(Italy) Loreto Cucchiarelli	5 November 1988	29 September 1989	7	1	0	6	14.29
(Italy) Loreto Cucchiarelli (France) Bertrand Fourcade	29 September 1989	31 December 1989	2	1	0	1	50.00
(France) Bertrand Fourcade	1 January 1990	30 August 1993	27	16	0	11	59.26
(France) Georges Coste	31 August 1993	19 June 1999	48	19	1	28	39.58
(Italy) Massimo Mascioletti	20 June 1999	19 November 1999	5	2	0	3	40.00
(New Zealand) Brad Johnstone	20 November 1999	26 April 2002	27	5	0	22	18.52
(New Zealand) John Kirwan	27 April 2002	18 April 2005	32	10	0	22	31.25
(France) Pierre Berbizier	19 April 2005	30 September 2007	30	12	1	17	40.00
(South Africa) Nick Mallett	3 October 2007	30 October 2011	42	9	0	33	21.43
(France) Jacques Brunel	1 November 2011	31 May 2016	50	11	0	39	22.00
(Ireland) Conor O'Shea	1 June 2016	17 November 2019	26	6	0	19	23.08
(South Africa) Franco Smith	21 November 2019	19 May 2021	13	0	0	13	0
(New Zealand) Kieran Crowley	19 May 2021	31 December 2023	27	10	0	17	37.00
(Argentina) Gonzalo Quesada	1 January 2024	present	26	11	1	14	42.31

Updated 7 March 2026

== Player records (career) ==
=== Most caps ===
#	Player	Pos	Span	Mat	Start	Sub	Pts	Tries	Won	Lost	Draw	%
1	Sergio Parisse	Number 8	2002–2019	142	139	3	83	16	35	106	1	24.65
2	Martín Castrogiovanni	Prop	2002–2016	119	91	28	60	12	30	88	1	25.21
3	Alessandro Zanni	Flanker	2005–2020	118	92	26	20	4	31	86	1	26.27
4	Marco Bortolami	Lock	2001–2015	112	92	20	35	7	29	82	1	25.89
5	Leonardo Ghiraldini	Hooker	2006–2020	107	84	23	25	5	20	87	0	18.69
6	Mauro Bergamasco	Flanker	1998–2015	106	90	16	75	15	30	76	0	28.30
7	Andrea Lo Cicero	Prop	2000–2013	103	79	24	40	8	32	70	1	31.07
8	Alessandro Troncon	Scrum-half	1994–2007	102	95	7	95	19	34	67	1	33.33
9	Andrea Masi	Fullback	2000–2015	95	82	13	65	13	23	72	0	24.21
10	Tommaso Allan	Fly-half	2013–	94	67	27	579	16	22	72	0	23.40

Last updated: Italy vs Fiji, 21 November 2026. Statistics include officially capped matches only.

=== Most tries ===
#	Player	Pos	Span	Mat	Start	Sub	Pts	Tries	Conv	Pens	Drop
1	Marcello Cuttitta	Wing	1987–1999	55	55	0	115	26	0	0	0
2	Paolo Vaccari	Wing	1991–2003	65	64	1	112	23	0	0	0
3	Carlo Checchinato	Number 8	1990–2004	84	74	10	105	21	0	0	0
3	Monty Ioane	Wing	2020–	52	52	0	105	21	0	0	0
3	Manrico Marchetto	Wing	1972–1981	43	39	4	84	21	0	0	0
6	Alessandro Troncon	Scrum-half	1994–2007	102	95	7	95	19	0	0	0
7	Mirco Bergamasco	Centre	2002–2012	89	82	7	256	17	12	49	0
7	Ange Capuozzo	Full-back	2022–	34	33	1	85	17	0	0	0
7	Serafino Ghizzoni	Wing	1977–1987	60	59	1	77	17	0	0	3
7	Massimo Mascioletti	Wing	1977–1990	54	54	0	68	17	0	0	0

Last updated: Italy vs Fiji, 21 November 2026. Statistics include officially capped matches only.

=== Most points ===
#	Player	Pos	Span	Mat	Start	Sub	Pts	Tries	Conv	Pens	Drop
1	Diego Domínguez	Fly-half	1991–2003	74	73	1	983	9	127	208	20
2	Tommaso Allan	Fly-half	2013–	94	67	26	579	16	102	95	1
3	Stefano Bettarello	Fly-half	1979–1988	55	54	1	483	7	46	104	17
4	Paolo Garbisi	Fly-half	2020–	58	55	2	312	5	52	61	0
5	Luigi Troiani	Fullback	1985–1995	47	47	0	294	2	57	57	0
6	Ramiro Pez	Fly-half	2000–2007	40	33	7	260	4	33	52	6
7	Mirco Bergamasco	Centre	2002–2012	89	82	7	256	17	12	49	0
8	Luciano Orquera	Fly-half	2004–2015	48	27	21	154	3	20	31	2
9	David Bortolussi	Fullback	2006–2008	16	15	1	153	1	35	25	1
10	Carlo Canna	Fly-half	2015–2021	53	28	25	152	5	20	26	3

Last updated: Italy vs Fiji, 21 November 2026. Statistics include officially capped matches only.

=== Most matches as captain ===
#	Player	Pos	Span	Mat	Won	Lost	Draw	%	Pts	Tries	Conv	Pens	Drop
1	Sergio Parisse	Number 8	2008–2019	93	18	75	0	19.35	68	13	0	0	1
2	Michele Lamaro	Flanker	2021–	47	18	28	1	38.30	15	3	0	0	0
3	Marco Bortolami	Lock	2002–2014	39	14	24	1	35.90	35	7	0	0	0
4	Massimo Giovanelli	Flanker	1992–1999	38	15	22	1	39.47	15	3	0	0	0
5	Marco Bollesan	Number 8	1968–1975	37	15	20	2	40.54	21	6	0	0	0
6	Massimo Cuttitta	Prop	1993–1999	22	10	12	0	45.45	15	3	0	0	0
7	Alessandro Troncon	Scrum-half	2000–2007	21	7	14	0	33.33	25	5	0	0	0
8	Marzio Innocenti	Flanker	1985–1988	20	7	12	1	35.00	8	2	0	0	0
9	Alessandro Moscardi	Hooker	2000–2002	19	4	15	0	21.05	5	1	0	0	0
10	Ambrogio Bona	Prop	1978–1981	18	9	9	0	50.00	4	1	0	0	0

Last updated: Australia vs Italy, 18 July 2026. Statistics include officially capped matches only.

== Player records (single match) ==
=== Most points in a match ===
#	Player	Pos	Pts	Tries	Conv	Pens	Drop	Opposition	Venue	Date
1.	Stefano Bettarello	Fly-half	29	1	2	5	2	Canada	(Canada) Toronto	1 July 1982
1.	Andrea Scanavacca	Fly-half	29	1	3	6	0	Croatia	(Croatia) Makarska	6 June 1998
1.	Diego Domínguez	Fly-half	29	0	1	6	3	Scotland	(Italy) Rome	5 February 2000
1.	Diego Domínguez	Fly-half	29	0	4	7	0	Fiji	(Italy) Treviso	10 November 2001
5.	Diego Domínguez	Fly-half	28	1	7	3	0	Netherlands	(Italy) Calvisano	21 May 1994
6.	Diego Domínguez	Fly-half	27	1	2	6	0	Ireland	(Italy) Bologna	20 December 1997
7.	Diego Domínguez	Fly-half	25	0	5	5	0	Romania	(France) Tarbes	26 October 1997
7.	Pierpaolo Rotilio	Wing	25	5	0	0	0	Denmark	(Italy) Brescia	1 November 1997
9.	Luigi Troiani	Fly-half	24	0	12	0	0	Czech Republic	(Italy) Viadana	18 May 1994
9.	Diego Domínguez	Fly-half	24	0	0	8	0	Romania	(Italy) Catania	1 October 1994
9.	Mirco Bergamasco	Wing	24	0	0	8	0	Fiji	(Italy) Modena	27 November 2010

Last updated: Italy vs Argentina, 9 November 2024. Statistics include officially capped matches only.

=== Most tries in a match ===
#	Player	Pos	Pts	Tries	Conv	Pens	Drop	Opposition	Venue	Date
1.	Pierpaolo Rotilio	Wing	25	5	0	0	0	Denmark	(Italy) Brescia	1 November 1997
2.	Renzo Cova	Wing	12	4	0	0	0	Belgium	(France) Paris	10 October 1937
2.	Ivan Francescato	Centre	20	4	0	0	0	Morocco	(France) Carcassonne	19 June 1993
4.	16 players on 3 tries									

Last updated: Namibia vs Italy, 27 June 2025. Statistics include officially capped matches only.

== See also ==
- Italy A national rugby union team
- Italy national rugby league team
- Top 12
- United Rugby Championship
