= Damiano Mazza =

Damiano Mazza may refer to:

- Damiano Mazza (artist)
- Damiano Mazza (rugby union)
