= Massimo Cuttitta =

Italy international rugby union footballer (1966–2021)

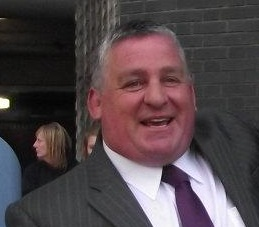
- Cuttitta in 2011
- Born: 2 September 1966 Latina, Lazio, Italy
- Died: 11 April 2021 (aged 54) Albano Laziale, Lazio, Italy
- Height: 5 ft 10 in (1.78 m)
- Weight: 242 lb (110 kg)
- Notable relative: Marcello Cuttitta (twin brother)

Rugby union career
- Position: Prop
Senior career
Years	Team	Apps	(Points)
1985-1988	L'Aquila		
1989-1997	Amatori Milano		
1997-1998	Harlequins	10	(0)
1999-2000	Calvisano		
2000-2001	Bologna		
2001-2002	Rugby Roma		
2002-2003	Alghero		
2003-2004	Bologna		
2004-2006	Rugby Leonessa		
International career
Years	Team	Apps	(Points)
1990–2000	Italy	69	(29)

Massimo Cuttitta (Italian pronunciation: [ˈmassimo kutˈtitta]; 2 September 1966 – 11 April 2021) was an Italian professional rugby union player and coach. He used to play as a prop. He was the twin brother of Marcello Cuttitta.

== Early life ==
Cuttitta was born at Latina. His family moved to South Africa in the late 1960s, where the Cuttitta brothers, including older sibling Michele, started to practise rugby. He attended High School at Pinetown Boys' High School along with his brother.

== Club rugby ==
After the return to Italy, Massimo and Marcello started to play at a more serious level at L'Aquila Rugby. In 1988, they both moved to Amatori Rugby Milano, where Massimo played until 1997. He won four titles of Italian Champion, in 1990/91, 1992/93, 1994/95 and 1995/96, and the Cup of Italy, for 1995. He later went to play for Harlequin F.C., in England, for the season of 1997/98. Returning to Italy, he played for Rugby Calvisano (1999/2000), Rugby Bologna (2000/2001), Rugby Roma Olimpic (2001/2002), Amatori Rugby Alghero (2002/03), Rugby Bologna (2003/04), for a second time, and Rugby Leonessa 1928, that he represented from 2004/05 to 2005/06, being his last team.

== International career ==
Cuttitta made his debut for Italy in 1990 against Poland and went on to gain 69 caps, scoring six tries and captaining the side 22 times. He played at the Rugby World Cup finals, in 1991 and 1995, this time as the captain. He won the title of the FIRA Cup, in 1995/97, winning against France in the final. He played in the first game for Italy in the inaugural Six Nations, in 2000, which his side won 34–20 against Scotland.

== Coaching career ==
He started a coaching career, after ending his playing days, becoming the coach of Amatori Rugby Milano, for 1996/97. In 2004, he took charge of Rugby Leonessa, for the following two seasons, moving then to Edinburgh Rugby, in Scotland. After a season, he moved to L'Aquila Rugby, where he had started his player career. He also worked for six years as scrummaging coach for the Scotland national team.

== Death and legacy ==
Cuttitta died in hospital in Rome on 11 April 2021, having been admitted with symptoms of COVID-19.

In his honour and to celebrate his contributions to rugby in both nations, starting from the 2022 Six Nations Championship the Cuttitta Cup is awarded to the winner of the match between Italy and Scotland.
