= Marcello Cuttitta =

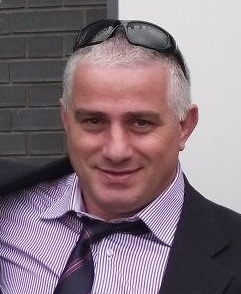
- Cuttitta in 2011
- Born: 2 September 1966 (age 60) Latina, Italy
- Height: 5 ft 11 in (1.80 m)
- Weight: 191 lb (87 kg)
- Notable relative: Massimo Cuttitta (twin brother)

Rugby union career
- Position: Wing
Senior career
Years	Team	Apps	(Points)
1985-1988	L'Aquila		
1988-1997	Amatori Milan		
1997-2000	Calvisano		
International career
Years	Team	Apps	(Points)
1987-1999	Italy	54	(110)
Coaching career
- Years: Team
- 2003–2011: Amatori Milan

Marcello Cuttitta (born 2 September 1966) is an Italian former rugby union player and coach. His position was at wing.

== Early life ==
He attended Pinetown Boys High School with his twin brother Massimo, and they both played for Pinetown 1st XV.

== Career ==
Cuttitta played club rugby for Italian teams including L'Aquila from 1985 to 1988, Amatori Milan from 1988 to 1997, and Calvisano from 1997 to 2000. Since retirement in 2003, he has been Amatori Milan's head coach

He played for the Italian national team at the inaugural Rugby World Cup in 1987 as well as representing them at the subsequent World Cups in 1991 and 1995. Marcello Cuttitta is this nations top try scorer as of February 2025 with 28 tries.

In total, Cuttitta played for Italy 55 times. He usually played on the wing.

He often played (both in club and National team) alongside his twin brother Massimo, who died of complications from Covid-19 in 2021.
